= List of Ipaglaban Mo! episodes =

These are the list of episodes that are aired on ABS-CBN's legal drama anthology Ipaglaban Mo! (lit. 'Fight For It!') since its premiere airing on June 7, 2014. Special episodes of the show are aired every last Saturday of December.

== List of episodes ==
=== 2014 ===
Episode	Title	Cast	Original air date	Directed by
1	Hindi Ko Sinasadya, Yaya	Precious Lara Quigaman, James Blanco, Izzy Canillo, Shamaine Buencamino, Michelle Vito, Dionne Monsanto, Dido Dela Paz	June 7, 2014	Manny Q. Palo
2	Lalaban Ang Tatay Para Sa'yo	Ella Cruz, John Manalo, Cris Villanueva, Matet de Leon, Eric Fructuoso, Kyline Alcantara, Jon Lucas	June 14, 2014	Eric Quizon
3	Ako Ang Biktima	Shaina Magdayao, Jhong Hilario, William Lorenzo, Gilleth Sandico, Gigi Locsin, Mimi Orara, Mikel Aguila	June 21, 2014	Richard I. Arellano
4	Kailan Mo Ako Mapapatawad?	Valerie Concepcion, Bugoy Cariño, Ana Capri, Archi Adamos	June 28, 2014	Lino Cayetano
5	Kaya Ba Kitang Itakwil?	Carlo Aquino, Smokey Manaloto, Niña Dolino, Eda Nolan, Art Acuña	July 5, 2014	Lyan L. Suiza
6	Umasa Ako Sa Hula	Pokwang, Dominic Ochoa, Dianne Medina, Odette Khan, Isay Alvarez	July 12, 2014	Erick C. Salud
7	Nang Dahil Sa Utang	Melai Cantiveros, Malou de Guzman, Amy Nobleza, Yves Flores, Reign Tolentino, JB Agustin, Paolo O’Hara	July 19, 2014	Theodore Boborol
8	Ang Pangako Mo Sa Akin	Melissa Ricks, Matt Evans, Boboy Garovillo, Nikki Valdez, Beverly Salviejo, Tony Manalo	July 26, 2014	Ricky S. Rivero
9	Ang Totoong Ako	Nonie Buencamino, Jackie Lou Blanco, Beauty Gonzalez, Sue Ramirez, Melissa Mendez, Alex Castro, Roeder Camañag, Daisy Cariño	August 2, 2014	Eric Quizon
10	Ibigay ang Aming Karapatan	JM de Guzman, Ketchup Eusebio, Janus del Prado, Yam Concepcion, Leo Rialp, Bryan Santos	August 9, 2014	Garry Javier Fernando
11	Ako Ang Iyong Ina	Vina Morales, Desiree del Valle, Raikko Mateo, Tutti Caringal, Johnny Revilla, Carla Martinez	August 16, 2014	Claudio Sanchez-Mariscal IV
12	Sa Aking Pagbangon	Aiko Melendez, Arron Villaflor, Lui Manansala, Denisse Aguilar	August 23, 2014	Jon Villarin
13	Akin Ang Asawa Ko	Allan Paule, Diana Zubiri, Dominic Roque, Malou Crisologo, Sunshine Garcia, Rhap Salazar, Heidi Arima	August 30, 2014	Lyan L. Suiza
14	Ang Lahat Ng Sa Akin	Janice de Belen, Dante Ponce, Aiko Climaco, Ricky Rivero, Manuel Chua, Cheska Billones, Aldred Nasayao, Lourdes Canzana	September 6, 2014	Jojo Saguin
15	Kasal Ka Sa Akin	Meg Imperial, Ejay Falcon, Jef Gaitan, Crispin Pineda, Debraliz, Karen Reyes, Alora Sasam	September 13, 2014	Mikey del Rosario
16	Paano Na Ang Pangarap?	Enchong Dee, Maria Isabel Lopez, Lito Pimentel, Lemuel Pelayo, Bryan Homecillo, Shey Bustamante, Nico Antonio, Paolo Serrano	September 20, 2014	Nick Olanka
17	Hustisya Para Sa'yo, Anak	Mickey Ferriols, Victor Neri, Sam Concepcion, Marco Gumabao	September 27, 2014	Mervyn B. Brondial
18	Buong Tapang Na Lalaban	Trina Legaspi, Irma Adlawan, Edgar Allan Guzman, Kristel Fulgar, Alex Diaz	October 11, 2014	FM Reyes
19	Akin Ka Lang	Rayver Cruz, Empress Schuck, Jacob Benedicto, Cheska Iñigo, Lorenzo Mara, Simon Ibarra	October 18, 2014	Carlo Po Artillaga
20	Akin Lang Ang Anak Ko	Jason Abalos, Helga Krapf, Ricardo Cepeda, Marina Benipayo, Macky Billones	October 25, 2014	Rechie del Carmen
21	Niloko Niyo Ako	Alex Medina, Bangs Garcia, Kean Cipriano, Ana Abad Santos, Jan Urbano	November 8, 2014	Ricky S. Rivero
22	Amin Ang Pamana Mo	Allen Dizon, Yayo Aguila, Ana Capri, Glenda Garcia, Devon Seron, Eva Darren, Celine Lim	Episode aired on November 15, 2014	Don Miguel Cuaresma
23	Pagkilala Ng Ama	Mylene Dizon, Jennica Garcia, John Medina, Lui Villaruz, Fifth Solomon, Mike Lloren, Apollo Abraham, Chiqui del Carmen	November 22, 2014	Raymund B. Ocampo
24	Love Ko Si Sir	Christian Vasquez, Myrtle Sarrosa, Andrea del Rosario, Via Veloso, Erin Ocampo, Kyra Custodio, Ali Claus, Yutaka Yamakawa	November 29, 2014	Avel E. Sunpongco
25	Kahit Bata Pa Ako	Inah Estrada, Francis Magundayao, Nadia Montenegro, Jong Cuenco, Mikylla Ramirez, Maila Gumila, Paul Salas	December 6, 2014	Carlo Po Artillaga
26	Bumalik sa kanyang kabit	Joem Bascon, Denise Laurel, Isabel Oli, Kathleen Hermosa, Josh Ivan Morales	December 13, 2014	Jerry Lopez Sineneng

=== 2015 ===
Episode	Title	Cast	Original air date	Directed by
28	Ang Aking Bagong Pagkatao	John Lapus, Ces Quesada, Rez Cortez, Chokoleit, Travis Kraft	January 3, 2015	Erick C. Salud
29	Nasa Maling Landas	Matt Evans, Rita Avila, Juan Rodrigo, Dianne Medina, Anna Luna	January 10, 2015	Theodore Boborol
30	Sa Mata Ng Bata	Tetchie Agbayani, Polo Ravales, Regine Angeles, Kazumi Porquez, Pamu Pamorada, Miko Raval, Perry Escaño	January 24, 2015	Frasco Santos Mortiz
31	Para Sa Mga Anak Ko	Valerie Concepcion, Emilio Garcia, Michelle Vito, Moi Marcampo, Bryan Homecillo, Krista Miller	January 31, 2015	Nick Olanka
32	Nasaan Ang Konsensya?	Arjo Atayde, Epy Quizon, Bernard Palanca, AJ Dee, Michael Roy Jornales, John Steven de Guzman, Sue Prado, Kyle Banzon	February 7, 2015	Toto Natividad
33	Totoong Mahal Kita	JM de Guzman, Meg Imperial, Karen Dematera, Micah Muñoz, Gigi Locsin	February 14, 2015	Ricky S. Rivero
34	Paano mo nagawa ito?	Nadine Samonte, Ian de Leon, Chanda Romero, Rufa Mi, Vince Angeles	February 21, 2015	Percival M. Intalan
35	Inabusong Karapatan	Precious Lara Quigaman, Marco Alcaraz, Maris Racal, Irene Celebre, Raye Baquirin, Richard Manabat	February 28, 2015	Jillmer S. Dy
36	Sa Aking Paggising	Enchong Dee, Devon Seron, Allan Paule, Daisy Reyes	March 7, 2015	Don Miguel Cuaresma
37	Pangarap Na Pagtanggap	Ynna Asistio, Liza Diño, Ron Morales, Lollie Mara, Eva Darren	March 21, 2015	Lyan L. Suiza
38	Pagkakasala Ng Ama	Lito Pimentel, Shamaine Buencamino, Sue Ramirez, Abby Bautista, Karen Reyes, Nikki Bagaporo, Anjo Damiles	March 28, 2015 (replay on July 9, 2016, and June 5, 2022)	Carlo Po Artillaga
39	Abot Hanggang Sukdulan	Nonie Buencamino, Dianne Medina, Neil Coleta, Mel Kimura	April 11, 2015	Jojo Saguin
40	Dahil Mahal Mo Siya	Wendell Ramos, Isabel Oli, Alex Medina, Marlann Flores	April 18, 2015	Darnel Joy R. Villaflor
41	Hanggang Sa Huli	Yam Concepcion, Allen Dizon, Andrea del Rosario, Jean Saburit, CX Navarro, Dexie Diaz	April 25, 2015	Raymund B. Ocampo
42	Ang Bintang Mo Sa Akin	Ella Cruz, Francis Magundayao, Jon Lucas, Yayo Aguila, Assunta de Rossi, Simon Ibarra	May 2, 2015	Avel E. Sunpongco
43	Sinirang Tiwala	Rayver Cruz, Niña Jose, Miko Raval, Nicco Manalo, Dante Ponce, Perla Bautista, Ces Aldaba	May 9, 2015	Lino Cayetano
44	Sa Dulo ng Daan	Juan Karlos Labajo, Joross Gamboa, Jenny Miller, Alfred Labatos, Igi Boy Flores, Marnie Lapus, Anne Feo, Rolando Inocencio	May 16, 2015	Garry Javier Fernando
45	Pinekeng Anyo	Maris Racal, John Manalo, Kiray Celis, Aleck Bovick, Kyra Custodio	May 23, 2015	Ludwig Peralta
46	Tanging Saksi	Ejay Falcon, Irma Adlawan, Allan Paule, Sharmaine Suarez, CJ Navato, Zeppi Borromeo, Mimi Orara, Richard Manabat, Jonic Magno, Anna Partoza, Tony Manalo, Heidi Arima	May 30, 2015	Richard I. Arellano
47	Nakaw Na Sandali	Erich Gonzales, Daniel Matsunaga, Boboy Garovillo, Cheska Iñigo, Archie Alemania, Pamu Pamorada	June 6, 2015	FM Reyes
48	May Hangganan ang Lahat	Andi Eigenmann, Patrick Garcia, Sylvia Sanchez, Ana Abad Santos, Johan Santos	June 13, 2015 (replay on November 26, 2016)	Andoy L. Ranay
49	Pusong Mapanlinlang	JC de Vera, Carla Humphries, Ingrid dela Paz, Boom Labrusca, Shey Bustamante	June 20, 2015	Jason Paul Laxamana
50	Ang Mundong Winasak Mo	Janice de Belen, Jestoni Alarcon, Neil Coleta, Kyline Alcantara, Minnie Aguilar	June 27, 2015	Jerry Lopez Sineneng
51	Akin Ang Anak Mo	Precious Lara Quigaman, Nikki Valdez, AJ Dee, Gerald Madrid, Sophia Discher	July 4, 2015 (replay on December 24, 2016)	Jerome Chavez Pobocan
52	Ilalaban Ang Dangal	Meg Imperial, Edgar Allan Guzman, Almira Muhlach, Marissa Sanchez, Dionne Monsanto, Alex Castro, JC Santos, Celine Lim	July 11, 2015	Ludwig Peralta
53	Nawaglit Na Tiwala	Ina Raymundo, Smokey Manaloto, Brace Arquiza, Bea Saw, Crispin Pineda, Gigi Locsin, Isaac Tangonan,	July 18, 2015	Ritchie Balza Roño
54	Sigaw Ng Katarungan (based on Cochise-Beebom Double-murder case)	Sofia Andres, Ken Anderson, Rommel Padilla, Pinky Amador, Isay Alvarez, Jong Cuenco, Ping Medina, Dido Dela Paz, Perry Escano	July 25, 2015	Lyan L. Suiza
55	Binasag Na Katahimikan	Trina Legaspi, Dianne Medina, Rodjun Cruz, Gio Alvarez, Janus Del Prado	August 1, 2015	Nick Olanka
56	Pagmamahalang Hinadlangan	Arci Muñoz, Polo Ravales, Francine Prieto, Froilan Sales, Jovic Monsod, Hannah Ledesma	August 8, 2015	Theodore Boborol
57	Sumpa Ng Pagnanasa	Isabelle de Leon, Raymond Bagatsing, Hero Angeles, Lorenzo Mara, Marife Necesito, Malou Canzana	August 15, 2015	Piem Acero
58	Pinaasa Mo Ako	Marco Gumabao, Michelle Vito, Sharmaine Suarez, Ynez Veneracion, Joyce So	August 22, 2015	Ludwig Peralta
59	Inabusong Inosente	Aiko Melendez, Nathaniel Britt, Justin Cuyugan, Peter Serrano, John Vincent Servilla, Kimberly Fulgar	September 5, 2015	Raymund B. Ocampo
60	Mapagsamantalang Amo	Bangs Garcia, Christian Vasquez, Roxanne Barcelo, Simon Ibarra, Rochelle Barrameda	September 12, 2015	Cathy O. Camarillo
61	Buhay Mo O Buhay Ko?	Carlo Aquino, Ynna Asistio, Tutti Caringal, Perla Bautista	September 19, 2015	Lyan L. Suiza
62	Tiwalang Nasira	Sarah Lahbati, Joem Bascon, Dante Ponce, Mickey Ferriols, Rhett Romero, Bong Regala, April Gustilo	September 26, 2015	Lino Cayetano
63	Lalaban Ang Api	Sunshine Cruz, Archie Alemania, Jao Mapa, Yogo Singh, Gem Ramos, Deb Garcia, Macky Billones	October 3, 2015	Frasco Santos Mortiz
64	Nagkunwaring Baliw	Epy Quizon, Precious Lara Quigaman, Yana Asistio, John Manalo, Ahron Villena	October 10, 2015	Roderick Lindayag
65	Itinagong Krimen	Meg Imperial, Tetchie Agbayani, Victor Silayan, Suzette Ranillo, Hanna Ledesma, Luke Conde	October 17, 2015	Chiqui Lacsamana
66	Tinalikurang Pangako	Vin Abrenica, Celine Lim, Yayo Aguila, JV Kapunan, Elisse Joson	October 24, 2015	Elfren P. Vibar
67	Sinamantalang Kahinaan	Veyda Inoval, Mark Bautista, Desiree del Valle, Dionne Monsanto, Marife Necesito, Bea Basa, Tonton Cabiles, Jess Evardone	November 7, 2015	Don Miguel Cuaresma
68	Kapalit Ng Pag-Ibig	Loisa Andalio, Yves Flores, Allan Paule, Maila Gumila, Rey PJ Abellana, Lester Llansang, Jon Lucas, Manuel Chua	November 14, 2015	Darnel Joy R. Villaflor
69	Ganti ng Sawi	Roxanne Guinoo, Patrick Garcia, Bernard Palanca	November 21, 2015	Claudio Sanchez-Mariscal IV
70	Babawiin Ko Ang Akin	Assunta De Rossi, Polo Ravales, Sunshine Garcia, Lui Villaruz, Aiko Climaco	December 5, 2015	Roderick Lindayag
71	Malagim Na Alaala	Jane Oineza, Ana Capri, Richard Quan, Alex Medina, Ron Morales, Gigi Locsin, Giovanni Baldisseri	December 12, 2015	Ludwig Peralta
72	Maging Akin Ka Lang	Dawn Chang, Zeus Collins, Jean Saburit, Maris Racal, Jopay Paguia, Johan Santos, Alex Castro, Alexis Navarro	December 19, 2015,	Lyan L. Suiza
73	Best of 2015	Atty. Jose C. Sison, Jopet S. Sison	December 26, 2015	—N/a

=== 2016 ===
Episode	Title	Cast	Original air date	Directed by
74	Silakbo	Andi Eigenmann, Edgar Allan Guzman, Victor Silayan, Rhed Bustamante, Kyle Banzon, Pamu Pamorada	January 2, 2016	Piem Acero
75	Pagnanasa	Denise Laurel, Bernard Palanca, Bangs Garcia, Dante Ponce, Pinky Amador, Raye Baquirin	January 9, 2016 (replay on February 5, 2023)	Cathy O. Camarillo
76	Sabik	Danita Paner, Arron Villaflor, Nina Dolino, Rolando Inocencio, Jubail Andres, June Macasaet, Jovic Monsod, Franchesca Floirendo, David Licauco, Cedrick Juan	January 16, 2016	Raymund B. Ocampo
77	Huwad	Inah Estrada, Lemuel Pelayo, Ken Anderson, Irma Adlawan	January 23, 2016	Mervyn B. Bondial
78	Peligro	Jerome Ponce, Michelle Vito, Christopher Roxas, Via Veloso, Carlene Aguilar, Gerard Pizarras	January 30, 2016	Claudio Sanchez-Mariscal IV
79	Sanib	Loisa Andalio, Ronnie Lazaro, Isay Alvarez, Robert Seña, Kazumi Porquez, Vangie Fulgencio	February 6, 2016 (replay on October 29, 2016)	Darnel Joy R. Villaflor
80	Brutal	Joross Gamboa, Karen Reyes, Glenda Garcia, Almira Muhlach, Mara Lopez, Benj Bolivar	February 13, 2016 (replay on February 26, 2023)	Paco A. Sta. Maria
81	Dahas	Rosanna Roces, Allan Paule, Junjun Quintana, Neri Naig, Micah Munoz, Francis Magundayao, Kiko Matos, CX Navarro	February 20, 2016	Dondon Santos
82	Mapusok	Desiree del Valle, Yves Flores, Maria Isabel Lopez, Christian Vasquez, Axel Torres	February 27, 2016	Myla Ajero-Gaite
83	Hayok	Myrtle Sarrosa, Ron Morales, Nikki Bagaporo, Tess Antonio, Jess Mendoza, Gigi Locsin	March 5, 2016	Roderick Lindayag
84	Engkwentro	Dante Rivero, Sunshine Garcia, Vin Abrenica, Biboy Ramirez	March 12, 2016 (replay on March 31, 2024)	Chiqui Lacsamana
85	Pagkakamali	Vina Morales, Ynna Asistio, Lander Vera Perez, Jerry O'Hara, Olive Cruz, Gilleth Sandico	March 19, 2016	Ato Bautista
86	Linlang	Carla Humphries, Spanky Manikan, Ynez Veneracion, Mel Kimura, Jef Gaitan, Arnold Reyes, Travis Kraft, Ericka Barreto, China Roces	April 2, 2016 (replay on February 12, 2023)	Ludwig Peralta
87	Bintang	JC Santos, Regine Angeles, RK Bagatsing, Shamaine Buencamino, Frances Makil-Ignacio, Cedrick Juan, Martha Comia	April 9, 2016 (replay on March 5, 2023 and April 21, 2024)	Andoy Ranay
88	Kahati	Assunta de Rossi, Justin Cuyugan, Ana Capri, Nhikzy Calma	April 16, 2016	Lyan L. Suiza
89	Sabwatan	Sunshine Cruz, Wendell Ramos, Liza Diño, Jairus Aquino, Sofia Millares, June Macasaet	April 23, 2016	Darnel Joy R. Villaflor
90	Lason	Mika dela Cruz, Joshua Garcia, Raymond Bagatsing, Sharmaine Arnaiz, Kyline Alcantara, Karla Pambid	April 30, 2016 (replay on September 30, 2017)	Carlo Po Artillaga
91	Tapat	Geoff Eigenmann, Alex Medina, Jerome Ponce, Roxanne Barcelo, Jen Rosendahl, Lance Lucido, Joel Saracho	May 7, 2016 (replay on June 11, 2023)	Andoy Ranay
92	Tiwala	Joseph Marco, Helga Krapf, Dexie Diaz, Danita Paner, JC Mantala, Josh Ivan Morales	May 14, 2016 (replay on May 19, 2024)	Jerry Lopez Sineneng
93	Martir	Teresa Loyzaga, Cris Villanueva, Kristel Fulgar, Dentrix Ponce, Dawn Chang, Gilleth Sandico	May 21, 2016 (replay on March 12, 2023)	Jerome Chavez Pobocan
94	Larawan	Rhed Bustamante, Victor Neri, Valerie Concepcion, Lee O'Brian	May 28, 2016	Dado C. Lumibao
95	Selos	Jason Abalos, Denise Laurel, Allan Paule, Louise Abuel, Althea Guanzon, Jose Sarasola	June 4, 2016	Roderick Lindayag
96	Bayaw	Joem Bascon, Meryll Soriano, Sunshine Garcia, Anna Luna, Glenda Garcia, Debbie Garcia, Jess Mendoza, Jahren Dave Estorque	June 11, 2016	Ludwig Peralta
97	Haligi	Jhong Hilario, Desiree del Valle, Ping Medina, Manuel Chua, Lem Pelayo, Loren Burgos, CX Manabat	June 18, 2016 (replay on June 18, 2023 and June 16, 2024)	Nick Olanka
98	Kapitbahay	Cogie Domingo, Yam Concepcion, Patrick Garcia, Brenna Garcia	June 25, 2016	Dondon Santos
99	Lola	Tetchie Agbayani, Dante Ponce, Dominic Roque, Mico Palanca	July 2, 2016	Elfren P. Vibar
100	Kabataan	Precious Lara Quigaman, Francis Magundayao, Grae Fernandez, Richard Quan, Jomari Angeles, Nathaniel Britt, Raine Salamante, Ivan Carapiet, Brian Gazmen	July 16, 2016	Piem Acero
101	Doktor	AJ Dee, Celine Lim, Melissa Mendez, Dianne Medina, Anna Vicente, Max Eigenmann	July 23, 2016	Myla Ajero-Gaite
102	Abogado	Ariel Rivera, Daria Ramirez, Bernadette Allyson, Dimples Romana, Jojit Lorenzo, Shey Bustamante, Angeli Gonzales	July 30, 2016	Andoy Ranay
103	Kapansanan	RK Bagatsing, Karen Reyes, Eric Fructuoso, Tanya Gomez, Ria Atayde	August 6, 2016	Ato Bautista
104	Kasambahay	Miles Ocampo, Nikki Valdez, Ara Mina, Antoinette Taus	August 13, 2016 (replay on January 22, 2023)	Nuel C. Naval
105	Hardinero	Jake Cuenca, Diego Loyzaga, Suzette Ranillo, Lorenzo Mara, Marx Topacio, Lui Manansala, Junjun Quintana	August 20, 2016	Lino Cayetano
106	OFW	Yen Santos, Beauty Gonzalez, Kitkat, Irma Adlawan, Wendy Villacorta	August 27, 2016 (replay on December 23, 2017)	Eric Quizon
107	Misyonaryo	Alessandra De Rossi, Meg Imperial, Wendell Ramos, William Lorenzo, Ge Villamil, Fatima Velasco	September 3, 2016	Jojo Saguin
108	Sanggol	Bela Padilla, Bianca Manalo, Miko Raval, Kakki Teodoro, Perry Escaño	September 10, 2016 (replay on March 19, 2023)	Cathy O. Camarillo
109	Pasahero	Sarah Lahbati, Luis Alandy, Kim Molina, Marnie Lapus, Boden Miranda, Cherise Castro	September 17, 2016	Alan Chanliongco
110	Pangarap	Yves Flores, Nonie Buencamino, Pinky Amador, Ricardo Cepeda, Daisy Reyes, Jomari Angeles, Chanel Morales	September 24, 2016	Paco A. Sta. Maria
111	Pangako	Miho Nishida, Tommy Esguerra, Clint Bondad, Jopay Paguia-Zamora, Lee O'Brian	October 1, 2016	Lyan L. Suiza
112	Aswang	Dominic Roque, Lito Pimentel, Archie Alemania, Michelle Vito	October 8, 2016	Ludwig Peralta
113	Witness	James Blanco, Carlo Aquino, Dianne Medina, Gem Ramos	October 15, 2016	Digo Ricio
114	Pagpag	Francis Magundayao, Nadia Montenegro, Atoy Co, Khalil Ramos, Jess Mendoza, Angelo Ilagan	October 22, 2016 (replay on November 4, 2017)	Richard V. Somes
115	Bulag	Ritz Azul, Marco Alcaraz, Marco Gumabao, Lem Pelayo	November 5, 2016 (replay on November 20, 2022)	Elfren P. Vibar
116	Kidnap	Malou de Guzman, Sue Ramirez, Mickey Ferriols, Froilan Sales, Alvin Anson	November 12, 2016 (replay on November 27, 2022)	Richard I. Arellano
117	Tandem	Jao Mapa, Albie Casiño, Smokey Manaloto, Ingrid dela Paz, Gigi Locsin	November 19, 2016	Garry Javier Fernando
118	Bugaw	Ella Cruz, Rommel Padilla, Jenny Miller, Viveika Ravanes, Mara Lopez, Trina Legaspi, Ben Isaac	December 10, 2016	Nuel C. Naval
119	Sugal	Dionne Monsanto, Vin Abrenica, Jean Saburit, Deniesse Joaquin	December 17, 2016	Lyan L. Suiza
120	Best of 2016	Atty. Jose C. Sison, Jopet S. Sison	December 31, 2016	—N/a

=== 2017 ===
Episode	Title	Cast	Original air date	Directed by
121	Buy-Bust	Christian Vasquez, Matet De Leon, Mon Confiado, Boom Labrusca, Zeppi Borromeo	January 7, 2017	Roderick Lindayag
122	Kapatiran	Yves Flores, Kiko Matos, Paulo Angeles, Sharmaine Suarez, Pam Sue	January 14, 2017	Ludwig Peralta
123	Hustisya	Meg Imperial, Juan Rodrigo, Tanya Gomez, Yana Asistio	January 21, 2017	Elfren P. Vibar
124	Beshies	Candy Pangilinan, K Brosas, Tess Antonio, Lloyd Zaragoza, Axel Torres, DJ Jhai Ho	January 28, 2017 (replay on October 9, 2022)	Chiqui Lacsamana
125	Paso	RK Bagatsing, Empress Schuck, Rhed Bustamante, Tetchie Agbayani, Edrick Ulang	February 4, 2017	Lyan L. Suiza
126	Abuso	Shy Carlos, Edgar Allan Guzman, Paolo Paraiso, Maricar de Mesa, Kitkat	February 11, 2017	Digo Ricio
127	Laro	Jairus Aquino, Marco Gumabao, Sharmaine Arnaiz, Francine Prieto, JV Kapunan, Nathaniel Britt, Mark Rivera, Jules Fernandez, Paul Pujante, Cindy Miranda	February 18, 2017	Theodore Boborol
128	Katotohanan	Rayver Cruz, Jennica Garcia, Maris Racal, Almira Muhlach, Patrick Sugui	February 25, 2017 (replay on February 25, 2024)	Ato Bautista
129	Mental	Isabelle Daza, Ejay Falcon, Shamaine Buencamino, Bing Loyzaga, Ria Atayde, Menggie Cobarrubias, MJ Cayabyab	March 4, 2017	Darnel Joy R. Villaflor
130	Sinapupunan (based on Bondoc vs. Mantala)	Vina Morales, Lander Vera Perez, Justin Cuyugan, Precious Lara Quigaman, Raikko Mateo, Lesley Martinez	March 11, 2017 (replay on March 3, 2024)	Elfren P. Vibar
131	Sementado	Barbie Imperial, Jerome Ponce, Enzo Pineda, Isay Alvarez, Allen Dizon	March 18, 2017	Ludwig Peralta
132	Taksil (based on Ecraela vs. Pangalangan)	Geoff Eigenmann, Victor Silayan, Dianne Medina, Djanin Cruz, David Chua, Mikel Campos, Alexis Navarro	March 25, 2017 (replay on February 18, 2024)	Roderick Lindayag
133	Espiya	Erich Gonzales, Arjo Atayde, DJ Durano, Dawn Chang, Tony Manalo	April 1, 2017 (replay on March 26, 2023)	Digo Ricio
134	Suspetsa	Alessandra de Rossi, Maxene Magalona, Ana Capri, Bernard Palanca, Paul Pujante	April 8, 2017	Lyan L. Suiza
135	Tiwala	Jane Oineza, Dominic Ochoa, Joem Bascon, Ces Quesada, Iñigo Delen, Anne Feo	April 22, 2017	Ian Loreños
136	Pagkakasala	Patrick Garcia, Danita Paner, Ara Mina, Alex Medina, Krystal Mejes, Wendy Villacorta, Jonic Magno, Heidi Arima	April 29, 2017 (replay on April 14, 2024)	Dado C. Lumibao
137	Hipag	Devon Seron, Matt Evans, Bubbles Paraiso, Sharmaine Suarez, Eda Nolan, Jong Cuenco	May 6, 2017 (replay on May 7, 2023)	Ato Bautista
138	Hulidap	Sophie Albert, Chanel Morales, Ping Medina, Jomari Angeles, Lemuel Pelayo, Fifth Solomon, Lilet	May 13, 2017	Tak Gordon Barrios
139	Hinala	Jhong Hilario, Ritz Azul, Irma Adlawan, Allan Paule	May 20, 2017 (replay on May 26, 2024)	Carlo Po Artillaga
140	Takas	Cristine Reyes, Arlene Muhlach, Tart Carlos, Cris Villanueva, Raquel Monteza, Jade Ecleo	May 27, 2017 (replay on May 14, 2023)	Darnel Joy R. Villaflor
141	Paratang	Vin Abrenica, Ron Morales, Shy Carlos, Almira Muhlach, Hanna Ledesma, Zeus Collins	June 3, 2017	Roderick Lindayag
142	Dukot	Zaijian Jaranilla, Bugoy Cariño, Jeffrey Santos, Precious Lara Quigaman, Christian Vasquez, Mickey Ferriols, Zeppi Borromeo	June 10, 2017 (replay on November 3, 2018 and June 2, 2024)	Paco A. Sta. Maria
143	Putol	Albie Casiño, Trina Legaspi, Meryll Soriano, Richard Quan, Kiray Celis	June 17, 2017	Eduardo Roy Jr.
144	Houseboys	Michael de Mesa, Junjun Quintana, Angelo Ilagan, Paulo Angeles, Jomari Angeles	June 24, 2017	Ram Tolentino
145	Bugbog	Angelica Panganiban, Wendell Ramos, CX Navarro, Paolo O'Hara, Mayen Estañero	July 1, 2017 (replay on August 28, 2022 and May 21, 2023)	Andoy L. Ranay
146	Testigo (based on People vs. Tuango)	JC Santos, Sylvia Sanchez, Benj Manalo, Nico Antonio, Joe Vargas	July 8, 2017 (replay on September 1, 2018)	Mervyn B. Bondial
147	Saklolo	Barbie Imperial, Rita Avila, Alex Medina, Ana Abad Santos, Tess Antonio	July 15, 2017	Myra Ajero-Gaite
148	Pasaway	Yen Santos, Troy Montero, Art Acuña, Alma Concepcion, Kyline Alcantara, Emmanuelle Vera	July 22, 2017 (replay on December 22, 2018)	Ludwig Peralta
149	Seaman	Marvin Agustin, Ria Atayde, Roxanne Barcelo, Jeffrey Tam, Gilleth Sandico, Carlos Canlas	July 29, 2017	Digo Ricio
150	Rabies (based on Uy vs. Vestil)	Jason Abalos, Empress Schuck, John Lapus, Katya Santos, Myel de Leon, Erika Clemente, Kaiser Boado	August 5, 2017 (replay on May 5, 2024)	Ato Bautista
151	Pikot	Sarah Carlos, Marco Gumabao, Dimples Romana, James Blanco, Yayo Aguila, Boom Labrusca, Jojo Riguerra, Rhea Angela Lim	August 12, 2017	Roderick Lindayag
152	Pabaya	Joem Bascon, Izzy Canillo, Jairus Aquino, John Manalo, Ryle Santiago, Nikko Natividad, Lance Lucido, John Vincent Servilla	August 19, 2017 (replay on May 28, 2023)	Carlo Po Artillaga
153	Ampon	Andi Eigenmann, Nikki Valdez, Nyoy Volante, Mike Lloren, Ynez Veneracion, Jess Mendoza, Alexis Navarro	August 26, 2017	Don Miguel Cuaresma
154	Tali	Yves Flores, Maxene Magalona, Teresa Loyzaga, Alvin Anson, Kira Balinger, Ynna Asistio	September 2, 2017	Eduardo Roy Jr.
155	Lihim	Adrian Alandy, Bianca Manalo, Francine Diaz, Ella Ilano	September 9, 2017	Paco A. Sta. Maria
156	Bihag	Ellen Adarna, Miho Nishida, Epy Quizon, Sunshine Garcia, Daisy Carino, Raye Baquirin	September 16, 2017	Ludwig Peralta
157	Duda	Rufa Mae Quinto, Gerald Madrid, Ron Morales, Claire Ruiz, Belle Mariano, Lei Mariano	September 23, 2017	Dado C. Lumibao
158	Sekyu	Smokey Manaloto, Maui Taylor, Victor Silayan, Gloria Sevilla, Joj Agpangan, Kim Molina	October 7, 2017	FM Reyes
159	Groufie (based on Vivares vs. St. Theresa's, GR No. 202666, 2014-09-29)	Ella Cruz, Kisses Delavin, Marco Gallo, Bing Loyzaga, Sammie Rimando, Kelley Day, Franco Hernandez, Stacey Gabriel, Emil Sandoval, Dolly de Leon, Jonic Magno, Anne Feo, Marilen Cruz, Malou Canzana, Eian Rances, Boden Miranda	October 14, 2017 (replay on October 6, 2018)	Theodore Boborol
160	Tuliro	Myrtle Sarrosa, Alex Castro, Debraliz, Miko Raval, Zandra Summer, Gab Lagman, Nathan Katibi, Wryan Chua	October 21, 2017 (replay on October 2, 2022)	Ludwig Peralta
161	Pasada	Ejay Falcon, Sandino Martin, Maria Isabel Lopez, Jennica Garcia, Kiko Matos	October 28, 2017	Myla Ajero-Gaite
162	Sayaw	Phoebe Walker, Rayver Cruz, John Regala, Carla Martinez, Crispin Pineda, Via Antonio, Arvic Tan	November 11, 2017	Digo Ricio
163	Apo	Denise Laurel, Jean Saburit, Tanya Gomez, Xia Vigor, Jose Sarasola, Clint Bondad	November 18, 2017 (replay on November 13, 2022)	Roderick Lindayag
164	Kulam	Gladys Reyes, Sharlene San Pedro, Sharmaine Suarez, Arnold Reyes, Lou Veloso, Vivoree Esclito, Sue Prado, JC Alcantara	November 25, 2017	Eduardo Roy Jr.
165	Banggaan	Aljur Abrenica, Efren Reyes, Kathleen Hermosa, Maika Rivera, Hero Angeles, Jane De Leon, MJ Cayabyab	December 2, 2017	Carlo Po Artillaga
166	Patol	Benjie Paras, Cris Villanueva, Ana Abad-Santos, Aleck Bovick, Mutya Orquia, Yesha Camille, Yogo Singh, JB Agustin, Chienna Filomeno, Kamille Filoteo	December 9, 2017	Paco A. Sta. Maria
167	Pikon	Ronnie Alonte, Juan Karlos Labajo, Lotlot De Leon, Sharmaine Arnaiz, Allan Paule, Michelle Vito, Wilbert Ross, Kyle Velino, Dexie Diaz	December 16, 2017 (replay on December 24, 2023)	Don Miguel Cuaresma
168	Best of 2017	Atty. Jose C. Sison, Jopet S. Sison	December 30, 2017	—N/a

=== 2018 ===
Episode	Title	Cast	Original air date	Directed by
169	Haciendero	Louise delos Reyes, Jomari Angeles, Nonie Buencamino, Lilet Esteban, Denise Joaquin, Kitkat, Menggie Cobarrubias, Gigi Locsin	January 6, 2018	Myla Ajero-Gaite
170	Mulat	Barbie Imperial, Luis Alandy, Mickey Ferriols, Richard Quan, Anna Vicente, Joana Hipolito, April Matienzo, Nikki Gonzales,	January 13, 2018	Froy Allan Leonardo
171	Angkin	Vina Morales, Candy Pangilinan, Christopher Roxas, Rap Fernandez, Francine Diaz, Noel Comia Jr., Uno Bibo, Jade Ecleo, Carlos Canlas	January 20, 2018	Eric Quizon
172	Hazing (based on Dungo and Sibal vs. People)	Jameson Blake, Precious Lara Quigaman, Anjo Damiles, Paulo Angeles, Joshua Colet, Migui Moreno, CK Kieron, Jay Gonzaga	January 27, 2018	Ludwig Peralta
173	Hawig	Janice De Belen, Heaven Peralejo, Ryle Santiago, Prince Stefan, Manuel Chua, Josh Ivan Morales	February 3, 2018 (replay on February 4, 2024)	Piem Acero
174	Ate	Isabel Oli, Empress Schuck, James Blanco, John Medina, Maritess Joaquin, Lilygem Yulores, Yutaka Yamakawa	February 10, 2018 (replay on February 11, 2024)	Don Miguel Cuaresma
175	Puslit	Wendell Ramos, Celine Lim, Shamaine Buencamino, Mark Rivera, Nonoy Froilan, Jun Narya, Gigi Hernandez, Al Gatmaitan	February 17, 2018	Carlo Po Artillaga
176	Disgrasyada	Ria Atayde, Enzo Pineda, Irma Adlawan, Ana Abad Santos, Julio Diaz, Cora Waddell, Jonic Magno	February 24, 2018	FM Reyes
177	Eskapo	Lito Pimentel, Kira Balinger, Alex Medina, Neil Coleta, Almira Muhlach, Brace Arquiza, Jovani Manansala	March 3, 2018 (replay on March 10, 2024)	Ato Bautista
178	Sumpaan	Ritz Azul, Diego Loyzaga, Boom Labrusca, Jett Pangan, Jon Lucas, Erin Ocampo, Mayen Estanero	March 10, 2018	Lemuel Lorca
179	Paniniwala	Patrick Garcia, Desiree Del Valle, Ron Morales, Bugoy Cariño	March 17, 2018 (replay on March 24, 2024)	Cathy O. Camarillo
180	Balita	Jairus Aquino, Raymond Bagatsing, Jeffrey Santos, Aubrey Miles, Angelo Ilagan, Kid Yambao, Anne Feo, Kaiser Boado	March 24, 2018	Eduardo Roy Jr.
181	Titser	Zaijan Jaranilla, Dimples Romana, Bobby Andrews, Kathleen Hermosa, Lui Villaruz, Belle Mariano, Louise Abuel	April 7, 2018 (replay on April 16, 2023 and April 7, 2024)	Froy Allan P. Leonardo
182	Daya	Gloria Diaz, Epy Quizon, Roxanne Guinoo, Nina Dolino, Arnold Reyes, Ysabel Ortega, Hanna Ledesma	April 14, 2018	Myla Ajero-Gaite
183	Tapang	Jane Oineza, Ryan Eigenmann, Nadine Samonte, JC Alcantara, Raquel Monteza, Gaye Piccio	April 21, 2018 (replay on April 23, 2023 and April 28, 2023)	Digo Ricio
184	Uliran	Nikki Valdez, Sid Lucero, Ping Medina, Joseph Andre Garcia, Yesha Camille, Gigi Locsin, Zyren Dela Cruz	April 28, 2018	Richard V. Somes
185	Bitin (based on Lao vs. Tsoi)	Cristine Reyes, Ahron Villena, Kim Molina, Junjun Quintana, Jason Dy, Rebecca Chuaunsu	May 5, 2018	Chiqui Lacsamana
186	Bicol	Valerie Concepcion, Jayson Gainza, Hero Angeles, Sammie Rimando, Veyda Inoval, Jenny Arteta	May 12, 2018	Ludwig Peralta
187	Pangalan	Michelle Vito, Yayo Aguila, Cris Villanueva, Karen Reyes, Krystal Mejes, Gab Lagman, Richard Manabat	May 19, 2018 (replay on April 30, 2023)	Tak Gordon Barrios
188	Dakip	Maxene Magalona, Mark Anthony Fernandez, Andrea Brillantes, Kiko Matos, Regine Angeles, Viveika Ravanes, Micah Muñoz, Jojo Riguerra, James Michael Bello, Gabriel Ibaragon	May 26, 2018	Eduardo Roy Jr.
189	Gapang	Louise delos Reyes, Rommel Padilla, Meryll Soriano, Vivoree Esclito, Nikki Gonzales, CX Navarro, Bea Basa, CK Kieron, Anykka Asistio	June 2, 2018	Ian Loreños
190	Panganay	Isay Alvarez, Alexa Ilacad, Jeric Raval, Izzy Canillo, Lemuel Pelayo, Alexis Navarro	June 9, 2018	FM Reyes
191	Korea	Kim Chiu, RK Bagatsing, Kyumin Moon, Almira Muhlach, Erin Ocampo	June 16, 2018 (replay on June 9, 2024)	Raymund B. Ocampo
192	Katiwala	McCoy de Leon, Loisa Andalio, Emilio Garcia, Allan Paule, Via Veloso, Mayen Estanero	June 23, 2018	Darnel Joy R. Villaflor
193	Sakal	Joseph Marco, Sue Ramirez, Jean Saburit, Lilet, Kirst Viray, Karen Toyoshima, Pontri Bernardo	June 30, 2018 (replay on June 30, 2024)	Dado C. Lumibao
194	Bayad	Jane de Leon, Lito Pimentel, Yves Flores, Lloyd Zaragoza, Dino Imperial, Benj Manalo, Ana Roces, Eda Nolan, Loren Burgos, Marlon Mance	July 7, 2018 (replay on September 4, 2022)	Froy Allan Leonardo
195	Teritoryo	Pokwang, Jeffrey Santos, Michael Rivero, Nikka Valencia, Paulo Angeles, Jomari Angeles, Raine Salamante, John Bermundo, John Vincent Servilla, Tony Manalo	July 14, 2018	FM Reyes
196	Biyenan	Angel Aquino, AJ Muhlach, Claire Ruiz, William Lorenzo	July 21, 2018	Digo Ricio
197	Bastardo	Jerome Ponce, Francis Magundayao, Ana Capri, Bobby Andrews, Anne Feo, Marife Necesito, Malou Canzana	July 28, 2018	Tak Gordon Barrios
198	Ganti	Dennis Padilla, Enzo Pineda, Marco Gumabao, Elisse Joson, Maila Gumila, Kyle Velino, Eian Rances, Giovanni Baldisseri	August 4, 2018	Raymund Ocampo
199	Nars	Jane Oineza, James Blanco, Dindi Gallardo, Richard Quan, Jef Gaitan, Vangie Martelle	August 11, 2018 (replay on June 4, 2023)	Ian Loreños
200	Kakampi	Maris Racal, Mary Joy Apostol, Pinky Amador, Rey PJ Abellana, Simon Ibarra, Charlie Dizon, Mark Neumann, Yesha Camile, Myel de Leon, Nhikzy Calma, Lilygem Yulores	August 18, 2018 (replay on August 10, 2019)	FM Reyes
201	Diploma (based on People vs. Feliciano G.R. No. 196735)	Aljur Abrenica, Joshua Colet, Arlene Muhlach, Bong Regala, Jon Lucas, JV Kapunan, Tom Doromal, Wilbert Ross, Rayt Carreon, Miggy Campbell, Carlo Lazerna	August 25, 2018 (replay on August 6, 2023)	Piem Acero
202	Umasa	Alex Medina, Nikko Natividad, Ana Abad Santos, Kakai Bautista, Juliana Parizcova Segovia, Maika Rivera, Henz Villaraiz, Karla Pambid	September 8, 2018 (replay on August 9, 2020 and September 24, 2023)	Chiqui Lacsamana
203	Puri	Joem Bascon, Roxanne Barcelo, Ron Morales, Crispin Pineda, Jerry O'Hara, Josh Ivan Morales, Miguel Vergara, Miel Espinoza	September 15, 2018 (replay on July 19, 2020)	Dondon Santos
204	Dangal	Ryza Cenon, Nonie Buencamino, Yayo Aguila, Sandino Martin, John Medina, Vance Larena	September 22, 2018 (replay on July 17, 2022)	Eduardo Roy Jr.
205	Hadlang	McCoy de Leon, Heaven Peralejo, Sharmaine Suarez, Manuel Chua, Arvic Tan, Rollie Inocencio, Veyda Inoval, Jeff Carpio	September 29, 2018 (replay on October 15, 2023)	Ludwig Peralta
206	Kadugo	John Lapus, Abby Bautista, Danita Paner, CX Navarro	October 13, 2018 (replay on October 16, 2022)	Ian Loreños
207	Abogada	Ritz Azul, JC de Vera, Maxine Medina, Almira Muhlach, Alex Castro	October 20, 2018 (replay on October 5, 2019)	FM Reyes
208	Hukay	Joross Gamboa, Kylie Verzosa, Cris Villanueva, Maritess Joaquin, Luis Hontiveros	October 27, 2018 (replay on November 2, 2019 and October 29, 2023)	Roderick P. Lindayag
209	Hayok	Miles Ocampo, AJ Muhlach, Allan Paule, Glenda Garcia, Ge Villamil	November 10, 2018 (replay on November 12, 2023)	Ram Tolentino
210	Agrabyado	Ejay Falcon, Anjo Damiles, Ronnie Quizon, Mayen Estanero, Ali Forbes, Debbie Garcia, Jan Urbano	November 17, 2018 (replay on November 19, 2023)	Mervyn B. Brondial
211	Set-Up	Barbie Imperial, Belle Mariano, Sammie Rimando, Erin Ocampo, Justin Cuyugan, Rochelle Barrameda, Boom Labrusca, Rubi Rubi, Amy Nobleza, Jojo Riguerra	November 24, 2018 (replay on June 25, 2023)	Froy Allan P. Leonardo
212	Bonus	Empoy Marquez, Irma Adlawan, Karen Reyes, Kathleen Hermosa, Raffy Tejada, Carol Reyes	December 8, 2018 (replay on December 31, 2023)	Myla Ajero-Gaite
213	Dalisay	Aljur Abrenica, Empress Schuck, Bernadette Allyson, Michelle Vito, Ryle Santiago	December 15, 2018 (replay on August 16, 2020 and December 17, 2023)	Don Miguel Cuaresma
214	Best of 2018	Atty. Jose C. Sison, Jopet S. Sison	December 29, 2018	—N/a

=== 2019 ===
Episode	Title	Cast	Original air date	Directed by
215	Hostage	Cherry Pie Picache, Anna Luna, Mon Confiado, Junjun Quintana, Jomari Angeles, Reynald Simon, Rebecca Chuaunsu	January 5, 2019	Roderick Lindayag
216	Apelyido	Desiree del Valle, James Blanco, Charles Kieron, Carla Martinez, Uno Bibo	January 12, 2019	Ritchie Balza Roño
217	Kuya	Zaijian Jaranilla, Yves Flores, JC Alcantara, Lovely Rivero, Gio Alvarez, Michael Flores, Jimboy Martin, Mischa Clark	January 19, 2019	Paco A. Sta. Maria
218	Depresyon	Joem Bascon, Roxanne Guinoo, Yesha Camille, Kitkat, Yutaka Yamakawa	January 26, 2019	Topel Lee
219	Akala	Rufa Mae Quinto, Atoy Co, Sunshine Garcia, Mitoy Yonting, Viveika Ravanes, Ricci Chan, Mikee Agustin, Carlo Lacana	February 2, 2019	Ludwig Peralta
220	Paasa	Sofia Andres, Kit Thompson, Ana Roces, Richard Quan, Nikki Gonzales	February 9, 2019	Chiqui Lacsamana
221	Akusasyon	Enzo Pineda, Jane Oineza, Alvin Anson, Manuel Chua, Zeppi Borromeo, Angelo Ilagan, Cherry Lou, John Bermundo, Dolores Bunoan, Peggy Rico Tuazon, Evelyn Santos, Cora Buenaventura, Alexis Navarro	February 16, 2019	Barry Gonzalez
222	Kubli	Polo Ravales, Roxanne Barcelo, Justin Cuyugan, Via Veloso, Mike Lloren, Jong Cuenco, Belle Mariano	February 23, 2019 (replay on October 8, 2023)	Chad V. Vidanes
223	Ingrata	Shamaine Buencamino, Maricar de Mesa, Yul Servo, Maila Gumila, Jairus Aquino, Jon Lucas	March 2, 2019 (replay on March 17, 2024)	Ian Loreños
224	Sabik	Mary Joy Apostol, Mickey Ferriols, Christian Vasquez, Victor Silayan, Edward Barber, Andre Garcia, Noemi Oineza, Wendy Villacorta, Seira Briones, Wendel Pamifilo, Nathan Solis	March 9, 2019	Froy Allan P. Leonardo
225	Reputasyon	Louise delos Reyes, Mark Anthony Fernandez, Francis Magundayao, Sandino Martin, Marlo Mortel, Mark Oblea, Micah Muñoz, Jourdanne Castillo, Karen Toyoshima	March 16, 2019 (replay on July 30, 2023)	Dondon Santos
226	Dignidad	Jane De Leon, Meryll Soriano, Josef Elizalde, Lloyd Zaragoza, Lara Morena, Michael Rivero, Van Allen Ong	March 23, 2019	Tak Gordon Barrios
227	Damay	Alessandra De Rossi, Christopher Roxas, Ping Medina, Izzy Canillo, John Vincent Servilla, Jade Ecleo, Kaiser Boado, Jun Nayra, Dunhill Banzon	March 30, 2019	Marinette de Guzman
228	Gayuma	Ria Atayde, John Arcilla, Vin Abrenica, Olive Isidro, Raikko Mateo, Ryan Rems, Donna Cariaga, Karl Gabriel, Zandra Summer	April 6, 2019	John Lapus
229	Higanti	Benjie Paras, Ryan Eigenmann, Almira Muhlach, Maritess Joaquin, Charles Kieron, Raine Salamante, Arvic Tan	April 27, 2019	Eduardo Roy Jr.
230	Saltik	Barbie Imperial, Tony Labrusca, Elmo Magalona, Gerald Madrid, Ced Torrecarion, Anne Feo, Alexa Miro, Kazumi Porquez, Lance Lucido	May 4, 2019 (replay on March 21, 2020)	Will Fredo
231	Hawa (based on People vs. Tabayan and People vs Abacia)	Meg Imperial, AJ Muhlach, Jerome Ponce, Yayo Aguila, Jimboy Martin	May 11, 2019	Myla Ajero-Gaite
232	Angkan	Isay Alvarez, Yves Flores, Dido Dela Paz, Dolly de Leon, Henz Villaraiz	May 18, 2019	Elfren P. Vibar
233	Dayuhan	Donny Pangilinan, Ana Abad Santos, Julian Trono, Benj Manalo, Jomari Angeles, Riva Quenery, Malou Canzana	May 25, 2019	Paco A. Sta. Maria
234	Pariwara	Ella Cruz, Epi Quizon, Ara Mina, Karla Pambid, JB Agustin, Blaine Medina, Joaquin Domagoso, Uno Santiago	June 1, 2019 (replay on July 2, 2023 and June 23, 2024)	Chiqui Lacasmana
235	Labandera	Ryza Cenon, Geoff Eigenmann, Jenny Miller, Xia Vigor, Pamu Pamorada, Aerone Mendoza	June 8, 2019 (replay on July 9, 2023)	Topel Lee
236	Lulong	Ina Raymundo, Neil Coleta, Hannah Ledesma, Luke Alford, Tin Mangle	June 15, 2019	Rachel Chavez
237	Utang	Jairus Aquino, Isabel Rivas, Allen Dizon, Eric Nicolas, Eslove Briones, Lilygem Yulores, Mischa Clark, Allen Cecilio	June 22, 2019 (replay on July 16, 2023)	Tak Gordon Barrios
238	Nanay	Precious Lara Quigaman, Maxene Magalona, Kiko Matos, Kakki Teodoro, Andrew Gan	June 29, 2019 (replay on July 23, 2023 and May 12, 2024)	John Lapus
239	Caregiver	Ariel Rivera, Denise Laurel, Andrea del Rosario, JV Kapunan, Jenny Colet, Brace Arquiza	July 6, 2019	Cathy O. Camarillo
240	Kalaguyo	Jhong Hilario, Nikki Valdez, Cindy Miranda, CJ Jaravata, Gigi Locsin, Nhilkzy Calma	July 13, 2019	Carlo Po Artillaga
241	Taiwan	Arci Muñoz, Vin Abrenica, Daisy Cariño, Marilen Cruz, Angelica Rama, Kara Mitzki	July 20, 2019	Ian Loreños
242	Impostor	JM de Guzman, Rafael Rosell, Juan Rodrigo, Glenda Garcia, Raul Montesa	July 27, 2019 (replay on March 28, 2020)	Myla Ajero-Gaite
243	Pagkukulang	Empress Schuck, Matt Evans, Mon Confiado, Niña Dolino, Al Gatmaitan, JJ Quilantang	August 3, 2019 (replay on August 13, 2023)	Will Fredo
244	Palaban	Jane Oineza, Hero Angeles, Angelo Ilagan, Kitkat, Lance Lucido, Allyson McBride, Zandra Summer	August 17, 2019 (replay on August 20, 2023)	Avel E. Sunpongco
245	Bagong Salta	Lito Pimentel, Teresa Loyzaga, Trina Legaspi, Victor Silayan, Carlo Lacana	August 24, 2019 (replay on August 27, 2023)	Carlo Po Artillaga
246	Disiplina	Miles Ocampo, Katya Santos, Raikko Mateo, Lorenzo Mara, Laiza Comia	August 31, 2019	Topel Lee
247	Desperada	Rita Avila, Kisses Delavin, Cris Villanueva, Christopher Roxas, Raine Salamante, Heidi Arima, John Heindrick Sitjar, Gaye Piccio	September 7, 2019 (replay on September 10, 2023)	Paco A. Sta. Maria
248	Malasakit	AJ Muhlach, Alyanna Angeles, Micah Munoz, Bobby Andrews, Mickey Ferriols, Olive Isidro, Joel Molina, Jourdaine Castillo	September 14, 2019 (replay on September 17, 2023)	Rachel Chavez
249	Samantala	Gelli de Belen, Louise Abuel, Boom Labrusca, Heaven Peralejo, Peter Serrano, Bugoy Cariño, Jessica Marco	September 21, 2019 (replay on September 3, 2023)	Ian Loreños
250	Paninira	Yen Santos, Chai Fonacier, Bryan Santos, Nico Antonio	September 28, 2019	Cathy O. Camarillo
251	Iskolar	Alexa Ilacad, Ronnie Quizon, Franco Laurel, Vangie Labalan, Charles Kieron, Victor Medina	October 12, 2019	Myla Ajero-Gaite
252	Alegasyon	Kiko Estrada, Meg Imperial, Maricel Morales, Marnie Lapus, Ryan Artienda, Tristan Mendoza	October 19, 2019 (replay on October 1, 2023)	Tak Gordon Barrios
253	Barang	Ruby Ruiz, Arron Villaflor, Kira Balinger, Denise Joaquin, Jojo Abellana	October 26, 2019 (replay on October 22, 2023)	Eduardo Roy Jr.
254	Legal na Ina	Louise delos Reyes, Jaycee Parker, Yves Flores, Jeric Raval	November 9, 2019 (replay on November 5, 2023)	Chiqui Lacsamana
255	Biyaheng Langit	Andrea del Rosario, Albie Casiño, Tart Carlos, Jhai Ho, Aya Fernandez	November 23, 2019 (replay on November 26, 2023)	Roderick Lindayag
256	Totoong Magulang	Sid Lucero, Yesha Camile, Raquel Monteza, Manuel Chua, Jamilla Obispo, Royce Cabrera, Nhikzy Calma	November 30, 2019	Ludwig Peralita
257	Sisante	Smokey Manaloto, Aleck Bovick, Eric Nicolas, Gigi Locsin, Lance Lucido, Jordan Hong, Edicta Hartveld	December 7, 2019 (replay on December 10, 2023)	Ian Loreños
258	Dinukot	Empoy Marquez, Maxine Medina, Kirst Viray, Shawntel Cruz, Silay Tan, Jan Urbano, Bernard Carritero	December 14, 2019 (replay on December 3, 2023)	Cathy O. Camarillo
259	Best of 2019	Atty. Jose C. Sison, Jopet S. Sison	December 28, 2019	—N/a

=== 2020 ===
Episode	Title	Cast	Original air date	Directed by
260	Himlayan	Isabelle Daza, Maxene Magalona, Alex Castro, Jef Gaitan, DJ Chacha, Marc Santiago	January 4, 2020 (replay on January 7, 2024)	Paco Sta. Maria
261	Cyber Bugaw	Sammie Rimando, Sharmaine Suarez, Allan Paule, Ryle Santiago, Cessa Moncera	January 11, 2020 (replay on January 14, 2024)	Eduardo Roy Jr.
262	Inaswang	Tetchie Agbayani, Soliman Cruz, Jerome Ponce, Mica Javier, Apey Obera, Lowell Conales, Richard Manabat	January 18, 2020 (replay on January 21, 2024)	Marinette de Guzman
263	Babae Po Ako	Francine Garcia, Robert Seña, Isay Alvarez, Mark Manicad, Mitch Talao, CX Navarro, Erika Clemente, Sher Kalifa	January 25, 2020 (replay on January 28, 2024)	Chiqui Lacsamana
264	Tukso	Nathalie Hart, James Blanco, Victor Silayan, Debbie Garcia, Abi Kassem, Omar Uddin, Angelica Rama, Ethyl Anne Osorio	February 1, 2020	Topel Lee
265	Huling Hapunan	Carlo Aquino, Karen Reyes, Enzo Pineda, Bodjie Pascua	February 8, 2020	Tak Gordon Barrios
266	Budol	Carmi Martin, Zaijian Jaranilla, Viveika Ravanes, Alireza Libre	February 15, 2020	Avel E. Sunpongco
267	Saleslady	Ria Atayde, Geoff Eigenmann, Junjun Quintana, Camille Sandel, Alfred Millan Beruzil, Gigi Hernandez, YD Diego	February 22, 2020	Arden Rod Condez
268	Kutob	Heaven Peralejo, AJ Muhlach, Jan Marini, Gerard Pizarras, Gigi Locsin, Shey Bustamante, Dido Dela Paz, Dolores Bunoan, Bernard Carritero, Ron Macapagal, James Bello	February 29, 2020	Raz Dela Torre
269	Ungol	Mary Joy Apostol, Rommel Padilla, Ping Medina, Jordan Herrera, Lovely Rivero, Nikko Natividad, Marc Oblea, Kokoy de Santos, Joao Constancia, Rans Rifol	March 7, 2020	Veronica B. Velasco
270	Carnap	McCoy de Leon, Lito Pimentel, Ronnie Quizon, Daisy Carino, Kirst Viray, Benj Manalo, Paulo Rivero, Benedict Campos, Vic Romano,	March 14, 2020 (replay on July 31, 2022)	Topel Lee
271	Yes, Sir	Alexa Ilacad, Joem Bascon, Ella Cruz, Hannah Ledesma, Jenny Colet, Elyson De Dios, Sela Guia, Gabb Skribikin, Sheki Arzaga	June 14, 2020	JP Habac
272	Umento sa Sahod	Dominic Ochoa, Katya Santos, Rolando Inocencio, Joel Molina, Karl Gabriel, Thamara Alexandria, Malou Canzana, Marlon Mance, Nunna Manabat	June 21, 2020	Myla Ajero-Gaite
273	Tiyuhin	Trina Legaspi, Allen Dizon, Jenny Miller, Maila Gumila, Jonic Magno, Jun Nayra	June 28, 2020 (replay on June 26, 2022)	Chiqui Lacsamana
274	Ninong	Adrian Alandy, Maricar de Mesa, Emilio Garcia, Ilonah Jean	July 5, 2020	John Lapus
