= Maalaala Mo Kaya season 26 =

Maalaala Mo Kaya
- Season 26
- Starring: Charo Santos
- No. of episodes: 47

Release
- Original network: ABS-CBN
- Original release: January 6 – December 22, 2018

Season chronology
- ← Previous; Season 25 Next → Season 27

Maalaala Mo Kaya (transl. Would you remember?; abbreviated MMK), also known as Memories in English, is a Filipino television series, which was first aired on May 15, 1991. It is the longest-running drama anthology on Philippine television.

== Episodes ==
#	Episode title	Directed by	Written by	Original air date	Ratings
1	"Drawing"	Nuel C. Naval	Benson A. Logronio and Arah Jell G. Badayos	January 6, 2018	N/A
Gelai may not have been lucky to have a complete family, but she has her real mother Gigi and aunts Linda and Rose to show her utmost love and care. As years passed by, she grew closer to her aunts while her mom lived away from them because of work. With three people looking after her, Gelai still believed their love was not enough. In high school, she learned to cut classes, go home late, and neglect her studies. The situation even got worse when she had a boyfriend who taught her different kinds of vices. How did her three mothers handle her situation? Did she find the missing piece in her life that she was looking for? Cast: Alma Moreno, Andrea del Rosario, Shamaine Buencamino, Michelle Vito, Karel Marquez, Trina Legaspi, Jef Gaitan, Alex Diaz, Krystal Mejes, Ryle Paolo Santiago, Anjo Damiles, Lilygem Yulores
2	"Galon" "Gallon"	Nuel C. Naval	Akeem del Rosario and Arah Jell G. Badayos	January 13, 2018	N/A
Even though he was born into an impoverished life, Freddie never stopped dreaming that someday he would become a teacher. However, being the youngest among twelve siblings, he knew it was not going to be easy since two of his older siblings have disabilities and needed more attention than him. Lucky for him, a certain group of nuns offered him a scholarship. His family, especially his older brother Elo, even suggested to support his everyday needs by contributing five pesos every day. But when he finished high school, his family begged off from supporting his studies any further. Their family's situation got worse when Elo died because of kidney failure. How did Freddie overcome this ordeal? Cast: Zaijian Jaranilla, Amy Austria, JC Santos, Enzo Pineda, Cris Villonco, Marco Masa, Maritess Joaquin, Kamille Filoteo, Jimboy Martin, Brace Arquiza, Andrew Muhlach, Mitch Naco
3	"Bibliya" "Bible"	Dado C. Lumibao	Benson A. Logronio and Arah Jell G. Badayos	January 20, 2018 (re-aired on May 1, 2021)	N/A
Abegail grows up in a religious family, influenced by her pastor father and her mother who works in their church. Her strong faith in God, however, is shattered when her father suddenly dies of aneurysm. Abegail blames God for what happened and starts to become rebellious. To make things worse, her mother decides to work in Thailand, which pushes her over the edge and leads her to using drugs and joining the world of cybersex. How will Abegail gather herself up? How will she bring her faith back? Cast: Kristine Garcia, Mutya Orquia, Dominic Roque, Simon Ibarra, Mara Lopez, Jon Lucas, Kim Molina, Prince Stefan, Ali Khatibi, Nikki Gonzales, JB Agustin, Mark Oblea, Tom Doromal, Sam Thurman, Claire Ruiz
4	"Mangga" "Mango"	Raz de la Torre	Mae Rose Balanay and Arah Jell Badayos	February 3, 2018	N/A
Daisy really liked Darling when they were kids. She did not care what others thought as long as she told the whole world how much she loved him. When they grow up, their priorities change. Daisy focuses all her time and effort on her family, while Darling enjoys his life while studying in Manila. Fate, however, finds its way of bringing them back together. This time, Darling is more smitten with Daisy after seeing her again after so many years. He notices that she takes good care of her family, which is something Darling looks for in a girl but failed to see in the women he dated in the city. Darling then pursues Daisy, but the feeling is not mutual anymore. How will Darling bring back Daisy's feelings for him? Will they have their happy ending? Cast: Janella Salvador, Elmo Magalona, Yayo Aguila, Karen Timbol, Krystal Mejes, Marc Santiago, Barbie Imperial, Luke Conde, Hiyasmin Neri, Jacob Dionisio, AJ Muhlach, Sammie Rimando, Anykka Asistio, Arvic Tan
5	"Medalya" "Medal"	Topel Lee	Akeem Jordan Del Rosario and Arah Jell G. Badayos	February 10, 2018	N/A
Ahwel and his siblings were raised by their mother alone. At the age of ten, he opted to help his mother in their small eatery instead of playing with other kids on the street. He continued excelling in school until he got a scholarship in one of the finest colleges in the country. Ahwel really valued his education and diligently went to class even if it meant he had to learn on an empty stomach. The biggest challenge, however, came when their house got burned down. How did Ahwel surpass this ordeal? Cast: Francis Magundayao, Ana Capri, Richard Reynoso, Raikko Mateo, Louise Abuel, Belle Mariano, Sunshine Garcia, Erin Ocampo, Fourth Solomon, Fifth Solomon
6	"Fireworks"	Nuel C. Naval	Joan Habana and Arah Jell G. Badayos	February 17, 2018	N/A
All Karla wished for is to go to Hong Kong Disneyland and see the fireworks display up close. Her father, Alex, promised to grant her wish if she continued doing well in school. One day, however, Karla visited her father to work and unexpectedly saw him kissing another woman. From that moment on, Karla vowed not to enter in a relationship in fear of getting hurt. But love does move in mysterious ways and later on Karla met Gio, the only guy she opened her heart to. Their relationship went well for years and Gio was even there when Karla finally set foot in Hong Kong Disneyland. Everything was like a fairy tale love story until Karla discovered Gio's infidelity. How did Karla deal with this heartache? Did she give him another chance? Cast: Bela Padilla, JC Santos, Zaijian Jaranilla, Belle Mariano, Almira Muhlach, Christian Vasquez, Eda Nolan, Heaven Peralejo, Loren Burgos, Chienna Filomeno, Sophia Baars, Christian Morones, Kid Yambao, Alexis Navarro
7	"Rubber Shoes"	Raz dela Torre	Akeem del Rosario	February 24, 2018	N/A
Ever since she was a child, Joy has always been a Daddy’s girl. She grew up getting even closer to her dad, Rolando, because of their common love for running. Every race she joined in, Joy would always find her father waiting for her at the finish line. Running was a bonding activity for her and her dad, and it enabled her to finish her studies via an athletic scholarship. Everything in her life was moving at a steady pace until one day, she received the unfortunate news that her father is suffering from pneumonia just moments away from competing in a national marathon. Did she continue the race or did she opt to see her father? Cast: Sharlene San Pedro, Dominic Ochoa, Katya Santos, Celine Lim, Patrick Sugui, Ced Torrecarion, Ashley Sarmiento, Faye Alhambra
8	"Magnifying Glass"	Mae Cruz-Alviar and Nuel Crisostomo Naval	Arah Jell G. Badayos	March 3, 2018 (re-aired January 15, 2022)	N/A
At a young age, Paolo vowed to help his blind mother, Tess (Irma Adlawan), in raising their family. This motivated him to study hard and finish college, and immediately landed a job as a customer sales representative in Manila. Paolo became unstoppable and steadily climbed up the corporate ladder, until his eyes started to blur. Because of his condition, his colleagues discriminated and made fun of him. Depressed by the criticisms, he chose to leave his work and return to Baguio to his family. How did Paolo rise above the situation? What pushed him to become a motivational speaker in his community? Cast: Carlo Aquino, Irma Adlawan, CX Navarro, Yñigo Delen, Lester Llansang, Lui Villaruz, Noel Coleta, Roeder Camanag, Jojo Abellana, JJ Quilantang
9	"Tangke" "Tank"	Dado C. Lumibao	Benson A. Logronio and Arah Jell G. Badayos	March 10, 2018	N/A
Ani grew up in a military family. After seeing what her mom went through with her dad, Ani vowed not to ever fall in love with a soldier. Although her mind was against it, her heart fell for her brother's senior in the military, Rommel, and ended up marrying him. Their marriage went smoothly until Ani suffered a miscarriage and was diagnosed with Poly Cystic Ovarian Syndrome (PCOS). To complicate things further, Rommel was assigned to go battle in Marawi. Would they still have the complete family they have always wanted? Did Rommel come home safely to fulfill his promise to Ani? Cast: Zanjoe Marudo, Kim Chiu, Ahron Villena, Michael Roy Jornales, Ana Abad Santos, Kristel Fulgar, Niña Dolino, Denise Joaquin, Jong Cuenco, Boom Labrusca, Encar Benedicto, Dawn Chang, Jamilla Obispo, Aiko Climaco, Akihiro Blanco, Jef Gaitan
10	"Barya" "Coins"	Nuel C. Naval	Akeem Jordan Del Rosario and Arah Jell G. Badayos	March 17, 2018	N/A
At an early age, Ely and his brothers Idel and Diony learned to work hard in the corn fields to help their widowed mother, Victoria. Ely knew that working in the field was not enough to provide for their needs and give his family a good life. Thus, he decided to try his luck and find opportunities in the city. Out of desperation, Ely resorted to stealing and eventually got caught by authorities. How did Ely face this ordeal with his family far away from him? How did his family deal with his absence? Cast: Ejay Falcon, Maria Isabel Lopez, Louise Abuel, Rhed Bustamante, Hero Angeles, Angelo Ilagan, Soliman Cruz, Ruby Ruiz, John Manalo, Andrew Muhlach, Mike Lloren, Mhyco Aquino, Lance Lucido, Nor Domingo, Mary Joy Apostol
11	"Ilaw" "Light"	Dado C. Lumibao	Joan Habana and Arah Jell G. Badayos	March 24, 2018	N/A
Ever since, Norman knew that they were being discriminated. His father, Roman, personally experienced this when he was forced to sign a waiver stating that he was not allowed to be promoted because of his lack of degree in education and his color. Instead of getting discouraged, Norman used his father's case as an inspiration to finish his studies. One day, however, a group of Koreans showed interest to claim their ancestral land. How did Norman used his knowledge to help his fellow Aetas? Cast: Jhong Hilario, Zaijian Jaranilla, Bugoy Cariño, Nikki Valdez, Jess Evardone
12	"Motorsiklo" "Motorcycle"	Raz de la Torre	Benson G. Logronio and Arah Jell G. Badayos	April 7, 2018	N/A
LoveWins for this couple who showed true love for one another in an out of the ordinary relationship. This is the story of Jeffrey and Ashley Capecenio, both happily married with their cute and bubbly bundle of joy, Baby Lina. But unlike other couples, they are a colorful match between the gay husband Jeffrey and the lesbian wife Ashley. Having put their respective orientations aside, both found their forever in each other, even though it seemed their baby would consider Jeffrey as her mother and Ashley as her father. But their union continue to be strong and healthy despite the financial difficulties and ordeals they face in life, particularly having to deal with people who question their unorthodox relationship. Ashley first met Jeffrey in a gay beauty contest and was smitten by his gorgeousness ever since that encounter. While Jeffrey had first frowned upon Ashley's interest in him, he would soon find out how real her love is for him-something he never experienced before, not even with his former boyfriend. This led to a wonderful loving relationship that would soon lead to Ashley being pregnant, and a life-long commitment to each other. Cast: Neil Coleta, Alora Sasam, Mickey Ferriols, Debraliz, Tom Doromal, Zonia Mejia, John Bermundo, Charles Kieron, Phi Palmos, Epey Herher, Lilygem Yulores
13	"Portrait"	Jeffrey Jeturian	Benson A. Logronio and Arah Jell G. Badayos	April 14, 2018	N/A
Before he rose to prominence as a pioneering neo-realist painter, Cesar had been stricken with several diseases, but was cheered on and taken care of by the love of his life. A sickly mestizo boy, Cesar was studying fine arts in college when he found out that he was color blind - a disability that shattered him but did not deter him from pursuing his dreams to become an artist. In the 1930s, he met the woman who would become his life's greatest supporter, Betty, but together they would brave challenges in order for their love to flourish. A mestizo with Spanish roots, Cesar was not immediately accepted by the family of Betty, whose grandfather was a Katipunero. Betty's family eventually agreed to the young lovers' marriage, which would become tumultuous as Cesar got sick with emphysema and became bedridden. He eventually worked at a promotions company making art for advertisements, putting his own art on hold to provide for his family. Only after work did Cesar focus on his own art, compelling the ever-understanding Betty to give way to her husband's passion and work hard to finance their growing family's needs. How did Cesar deal with his vision deficiency and fight for his love for Betty? How did the couple manage to withstand all the challenges that came their way? Cast: Ian Veneracion, Angel Aquino, Ria Atayde, Patrick Sugui, Mary Joy Apostol, Krystal Mejes, Jane de Leon, Josef Elizalde, Carla Martinez, Mica Javier, Aurora Sevilla, Dexie Diaz, Jessica Marasigan, Loren Burgos, Nathaniel Britt, Andre Garcia, Celeste Legaspi
14	"Surfboard"	Raz de la Torre	Benson A. Logronio and Arah Jell G. Badayos	April 21, 2018	N/A
As an only child, Harry lived a comfortable life and got the love and attention from his parents even if his father worked abroad. But all of this changed when his mother Sylvia needed to fly to his father, who was diagnosed with lymphoma. Things even got worse when Nestor suddenly came home without Sylvia and later on passed away because of his illness. But instead of getting mad at his mother, Harry focused on his studies and found love in surfing with the help of his Lola Soleng and Lola Pedro. However, another huge mishap struck his life when he was involved in a car accident that caused the amputation of one of his arms. How did Harry overcome this ordeal? What pushed him to continue his love for surfing? Cast: Gina Pareño, RK Bagatsing, Cris Villanueva, Mara Lopez, Crispin Pineda, Maricel Morales, Luis Hontiveros, Robert Bermudez, Harold Baldonado
15	"Sunflower"	Raz de la Torre	Joan P. Habana and Arah Jell G. Badayos	May 5, 2018	N/A
Ever since he was diagnosed with polio, Ven remained positive and never let his condition stop him from living his life. He still chose to go to school just like his brothers. Because of his perseverance, he got a scholarship grant to finish his studies in high school. His sunny disposition continued until one day, his mother died and he cannot do anything but to hold her close and helplessly scream for help. How did he surpass this ordeal? What pushed him to continue his life and become an inspiration to fellow PWDs? Cast: Enchong Dee, Jeffrey Quizon, Ina Raymundo, CX Navarro, JB Agustin, Nikki Bacolod, Marc Acueza, JV Kapunan, Amy Nobleza, Maritess Joaquin, Yasmyne Suarez
16	"Eskoba" "Brush"	Dado C. Lumibao	Rose Colindres and Arah Jell G. Badayos	May 12, 2018	N/A
Ever since Azon went to Italy, her daughter, Tet, and son, Tot, have been living comfortable lives and can buy get anything they want. They have no idea how hard life is for her there until they paid her a visit and personally saw her working condition. Even if it hurts her to see Azon that way, Tet used what she saw as a motivation to work hard and get her mother out that situation. Life became more difficult after Augusto suffered a stroke, leaving Azon no choice but to go back to the Philippines and take care of him. How will they survive this ordeal? What will Tet do to help her family? Cast: Pokwang, Empress Schuck, Jeric Raval, David Chua, Dang Cruz, Hyubs Azarcon, Dino Imperial, Kim Molina, Mikee Agustin
17	"Pilat" "Scar"	Nuel C. Naval	Benson A. Logronio and Arah Jell G. Badayos	May 19, 2018	N/A
They may have different priorities in life, but fate still brought together Grace and Vhinez when they worked together as models. Vhinez was quickly smitten by Grace's beauty and kind heart and before long he admitted his feelings to the young lady. Grace hesitated at first but later on gave in because of Vhinez' sincerity and perseverance. Only three months in their relationship, however, the two got into a car accident that ruined their faces. How did they surpass this ordeal? How will this affect their career as models? Cast: Yves Flores, Irma Adlawan, Carlos Morales, Rochelle Barrameda, Fifth Solomon, Kamille Filoteo, Melizza Jimenez, Kira Balinger
18	"Hapagkainan" "Dining Table"	Nuel C. Naval	Akeem Jordan Del Rosario and Arah Jell G. Badayos	May 26, 2018	N/A
Among the siblings, twins Bea and Nina were closest to their father, Robert They looked up to him so much and really saw him as is a reliable and an ideal father. One day, Robert went missing and the kids were made to believe that he was sick. Years passed and there was still no sign of him. In his absence, mother Evy took on the roles of both being a mother and a father. When Robert finally came home, things went back to normal. But that was until Bea and Nina discovered that he is drug addict. How did they accept their father's state? How did they help him change for the better? Cast: Denise Laurel, James Blanco, Alexa Ilacad, Michelle Vito, Marina Benipayo, Mari Kaimo, Krystal Mejes, Allyson McBride, Luke Alford, Kyle Echarri, Christian Morones
19	"Lambat" "Net"	Dado C. Lumibao	Mae Rose B. Balanay and Arah Jell G. Badayos	June 2, 2018	N/A
When Romel went to Manila to find a job, he found love instead in Esther. After they got married and start a family, Romel brought Esther back to his hometown, where he was welcomed with the shocking news that his brother, Nonoy, was diagnosed with dystonia – a neurological movement disorder that results into twisting, repetitive movements, or abnormally fixed postures. The family learned Nonoy's condition to be matrilineally passable condition to males. Romel's brothers Toto and Joey would be diagnosed with the illness. How did Romel face this ordeal? How did it affect him, knowing that he could be next in line to having dystonia? Cast: McCoy de Leon, Nanding Josef, Angelo Ilagan, Claire Ruiz, Marlo Mortel, Erin Ocampo, Mico Aytona, Zeppi Borromeo, Paco Evangelista, Roy Requejo, Jacqui Leus
20	"Saranggola" "Kite"	Nuel C. Naval	Benson A. Logronio and Arah Jell G. Badayos	June 9, 2018	N/A
Adelina grew up knowing her mother, Norma, had mental health issues. It became more evident when her mother suffered a nervous breakdown after three of her siblings and her dad passed away. These trials, however, made their bond and love for each other stronger than ever. One day, however, Norma disappeared after having another meltdown. Did Adelina see her mother again? How did she handle the possibility of losing the only person left in her family? Cast: Malou de Guzman, Ana Capri, Mary Joy Apostol, Rhed Bustamante, Bugoy Cariño, Belle Mariano, Raine Salamante, Marc Santiago, Akihiro Blanco, Jordan Castillo, Laiza Comia, Mike Lloren, Simon Ibarra
21	"Ukelele"	Raz de la Torre	Mae Rose B. Balanay and Arah Jell G. Badayos	June 16, 2018	N/A
At the early age of eleven, Tin already identified as a lesbian and had been in romantic relationships with other girls. But it was only until she turned 18, that's when she met her first boyfriend, Andrew. Their relationship lasted for four years and after that, Tin swore not to fall in love and get into a relationship until she was able to provide for her family's needs. However, fate had a different plan for her when the breezy chick boy Boom entered her life. Could he be the one to reignite the flame in Tin's 'titibo-tibo' heart? Cast: Maris Racal, Jameson Blake, Neil Coleta, Mutya Orquia, Mitoy Yonting, Rochelle Barrameda, Mica Javier, Chienna Filomeno, Pamu Pamorada, Jimboy Martin, Zonia Mejia
22	"Laptop"	Nuel C. Naval	Akeem Jordan D. Del Rosario and Arah Jell G. Badayos	June 23, 2018 (re-aired September 10, 2021)	N/A
After joining "Junior MasterChef Pinoy Edition," Caitlin became a celebrity with a steadily growing fanbase on her Facebook page, which was managed by her mother Vivian. The mother and daughter befriended a fan, Charles, who was able to gain their trust. All was well until they found out that he used Caitlin's identity and pictures to catfish another fan into a two-year relationship with him. How did Caitlin recover her identity? Cast: Rufa Mae Quinto, Michelle Vito, Rommel Padilla, Xia Vigor, Krystal Mejes, Mark Neumann, Kokoy de Santos, Ashley Sarmiento, Kazel Kinouchi, AC Bonifacio, Kyle Velino
23	"Luneta Park"	Dado C. Lumibao	Joan Habana as Arah Jell G. Badayos	June 30, 2018	N/A
Modesto and his son Dick become homeless after leaving his wife who is addicted to gambling.They will end up staying in Luneta Park in Manila, which will serve as their home as they face trials and hardships, from sleeping on the ground to begging for their daily needs.Despite living on the streets, Modesto will work hard as a carpenter to send Dick to school. For his part, Dick, will study diligently so that he can achieve his dream of graduating college, and repaying the sacrifices his father made by giving him a good life. In the face of their hardships, will Dick ever achieve his dream of finishing his studies? Will he ever be able to provide a good life for his father? Cast: Long Mejia, Jairus Aquino, Yñigo Delen, Lance Lucido, Maricel Morales, Yesha Camile, Luis Hontiveros
24	"Cards"	Raz de la Torre	Joan Habana and Arah Jell G. Badayos	July 7, 2018	N/A
Magic has always had a special place in Rosela's heart since it is what binds her to her father, Ruperto. However, after Ruperto unexpectedly dies, their family struggles financially, forcing Rosela and her siblings to start working. She promises to honor him by still making him proud one day. Rosela finds a way to continue her education, but eventually returns to her true passion against the wishes of her mother, Josie (Assunta de Rossi), who believes magic is a waste of time. Will Rosela fulfill her promise to her father by achieving her dream of becoming a magician, or by abandoning her passion to provide for their family? Cast: Janella Salvador, Assunta de Rossi, Mutya Orquia, Louise Abuel, Anjo Damiles, Hannah Ledesma, Nikki Gonzales, Laiza Comia, Zeppi Borromeo, Sophia Reola, Sonjia Calit, Melizza Jimenez, Angelo Alayon, Tirso Cruz III
25	"Kalabaw" "Buffalo"	Nuel C. Naval and Elfren Vibar	Joan Habana and Arah Jell G. Badayos	July 14, 2018	N/A
Growing up, Emma looked up to rebels believing them to be forces of good, and because her father and older brothers were also members. She will join the rebels upon the encouragement of her father with the intent of giving her younger siblings a better future and standing up for the poor. Emma will easily rise up its ranks as the leader of its young members, but disillusionment will settle in after she sees the cruelty that the group is also capable of. She will then decide to escape to lead a peaceful life with her whole family, but her former comrades will find them and exact their revenge. Will Emma ever find a way to live a peaceful life with her family? Cast: Dimples Romana, Lito Pimentel, Sharmaine Suarez, Belle Mariano, Alex Medina, Mon Confiado, Jojit Lorenzo, John Medina, Karla Pambid, Raquel Monteza, Encar Benedicto, Karen Reyes, Celine Lim, Brace Arquiza, Kiko Matos, Lester Llansang, Amy Nobleza, Myel De Leon, Francine Diaz, Josh Ivan Morales
26	"Burger Stand"	Raz de la Torre	Akeem Jordan D. Del Rosario	July 21, 2018	N/A
Allan and Remy will fall in love at the prime of their youth. Their small family is happy at first, but little by little, their relationship takes a negative turn as Allan becomes tired of earning money from a factory for his family instead of studying and achieving his own dreams. Allan then leaves Remy and their child alone, while Remy works hard to provide for her child. Though Allan's family disapproves of Remy because of the difference in their social status, he will try to stand by her especially when she gets pregnant. Remy meets Nathan, a man who is the exact opposite of Allan, at a time when she has put a hold on finding love and is focused on raising her child. Nathan fills the role left behind by Allan and loves her unconditionally. Their relationship is threatened, however, when Allan comes back to get Remy and his child, while she realizes that she still loves Allan. Who will Remy choose in the end - Allan, the great love of her life, or Nathan, the man who loves her greatly? Cast: Billy Crawford, Coleen Garcia, Junjun Quintana, Almira Muhlach, Maila Gumila, Gary Lim, Bing Davao, Alora Sasam, Kyra Custodio, Karl Gabriel
27	"Manibela" "Steering Wheel"	Raz de la Torre	Benson A. Logronio and Arah Jell G. Badayos	July 28, 2018	N/A
Marlon has been experiencing unusual, involuntary mannerisms since he was a child. He tries to lead a normal life but his unexplainable actions keep him from getting jobs and finding love, until he meets Rio, who loves him for who he is. The couple later finds out that Marlon's strange behavior is caused by Tourette Syndrome. He works hard to provide for his family despite the difficulties caused by his illness. He is determined to overcome life's challenges no matter how difficult it may be for him. How will Marlon be able to go beyond his dire disease? Cast Joseph Marco, Ryza Cenon, Pinky Amador, Soliman Cruz, Glenda Garcia, Mari Kaimo, Regine Angeles, Alex Castro, Marco Masa, Gio Alvarez, Alison McBride, CX Navarro, Zyren Dela Cruz
28	"Korona" "Crown"	Dado C. Lumibao	Benson A. Logronio and Arah Jell G. Badayos	August 4, 2018	N/A
Growing up in Pasay, Tyrone James "TJ" Ortega, the son of an OFW and a former seaman, was often ridiculed for his effeminate behavior. He will try his best to act more manly for the sake of his parents, but in the process will deny his true self. The bullying continued when he moved to Isabela upon the death of his main protector and defender, his father. Upon hearing of her son's hardships she brought him back to Pasay. Although his mother Cynthia accepted him for who he is, she told him to refrain from crossdressing to avoid being made fun of. However, TJ found a different kind of joy in crossdressing and even began to join gay pageants that made Cynthia disappointed in him. Despite this, he bravely faced his bullies to showcase his wits and talents and live out his dreams. Will TJ ever bring home the crown and win the acceptance of the people he loves? Cast: Elizabeth Oropesa, Nonie Buencamino, Via Veloso, Josh De Guzman, Milo Elmido Jr., John Vincent Servilla, Alexa Macanan, Juliana Parizcova Segovia
29	"Lason" "Poison"	Nuel C. Naval	Mary Rose Colindres and Arah Jell G. Badayos	August 11, 2018	N/A
Joan longed for a complete family after coming from a broken home and she found fulfillment of her dream when she married Raul. Her husband worked hard to support their family as an OFW in California. However, the distance strained their marriage, even as Joan strived to make their relationship work to prevent her kids from going through what she went through as a child. One day the remittances stopped coming and in her desperation to meet her children's needs, she sent her husband a photo of her pretending to poison their children in the hopes it would make him resume his responsibilities to them. Her plan backfired when the photo became an evidence in a child abuse case against her. With her family ruined, Joan turned to her mother Beth, who came back to her life in hopes of rebuilding a relationship with her. Will Joan ever get her children back? Will she ever have the complete happy family she has always dreamt of? Cast: Beauty Gonzalez, James Blanco, Aleck Bovick, Rhed Bustamante, Yñigo Delen, Yesha Camile, Sophia Reola, Lollie Mara, Mara Lopez, Erika Padilla, Tess Antonio, Paolo Rivero
30	"Singsing" "Ring"	Paco Sta. Maria	Mae Rose B. Balanay and Arah Jell G. Badayos	August 18, 2018	N/A
Aldrin vowed to love only one woman for his whole life. He saw fulfillment of this promise in Angel, his college girlfriend. Despite having their relationship tested many times, the couple did not give up one another. Their love got stronger and one day, they decided to make the ultimate pledge to each other in marriage. However, their happiness took a sudden blow when they found out about Angel's heart condition. How did Aldrin and Angel face this obstacle in their lives? Cast: Khalil Ramos, Sofia Andres, Isay Alvarez, Allan Paule, Karen Timbol, Jong Cuenco, Angelo Ilagan, AJ Muhlach, Pamu Pamorada, Maru Delgado, Carlo Lacana, Arvic Tan, Riva Quenery, Yasmyne Suarez, Jacqui Leus
31	"Mikropono" "Microphone"	Dado C. Lumibao	Rose Colindres and Arah Jell G. Badayos	August 25, 2018	N/A
Janine discovered her passion and talent for performing at a young age. To hone her skills, her parents encouraged her to take singing lessons and join singing competitions. However, luck seemed to be not in her favor as many doubted the capabilities of her low, raspy voice. People did not think she would make it because she is not a 'biritera.' Her mother saw her struggle and eventually chose to discourage Janine from participating in singing contests to protect her daughter and spare her feelings from harsh comments. How did Janine overcome the negativity of her bashers despite her youth? What led her to keep pursuing her dreams despite the setbacks? Cast: Yesha Camile, Jenine Desiderio, Richard Quan, Ruby Ruiz, Joj Agpangan, Viveika Ravanes, Marnie Lapus, Bea Basa, Zyren Dela Cruz, Janine Berdin
32	"Alkansya" "Piggy Bank"	Mervyn B. Brondial	Akeem Jordan D. Del Rosario and Arah Jell G. Badayos	September 1, 2018	N/A
Hercules is a man of simple means who tries his best to provide for his wife Jucel and children. He works hard at any job just to be able to put food on the table and send his kids to school. However, Hercules and Jucel face their biggest challenge yet when their youngest child needs a costly surgery-amounting to P1.2 million-to live. To what lengths will Hercules go to make his child better? How will Jucel and Hercules triumph over their family ordeal? Cast: Joross Gamboa, Roxanne Guinoo, Ronnie Lazaro, Ces Quesada, Raine Salamante, Krystal Mejes, Justin James Quilantang, Sophia Reola, Jamilla Obispo, Raphael Robes, Patty Mendoza
33	"Duyan" "Hammock"	Nuel Crisostomo Naval	Jaymar Santos Castro and Arah Jell G. Badayos	September 8, 2018	N/A
Alma is forced to become an OFW because of her family's poverty. Despite her husband, Manuel's, protests she leaves home to go work in Dubai, where she is mistreated and abused, and even raped by her employer. She will hide what she went through from Manuel and their children. Instead of a good life for her family, she will come home ashamed and bearing a secret - she is pregnant as a result of the tragedy she experienced.Will Alma's family ever learn to accept what happened to her and the child that came of it? Cast: Meryll Soriano, Allen Dizon, Maila Gumila, Abby Bautista, CX Navarro, Nhikzy Calma, Lilygem Yulores, Ali Khatibi
34	"Paruparo" "Butterfly"	Raz de la Torre	Mae Rose B. Balanay and Arah Jell G. Badayos	September 22, 2018	N/A
Joseph will grow up being cared for and loved by his grandparents who will raise him as their own. Until one day his true father comes for him to bring him home and send him to school. Although he does not want to leave his grandparents, he goes with his father in the hopes of finishing his studies and making them proud. However, instead of love and affection, Joseph suffers abuse and mistreatment at the hands of his stepmother. He will defend himself against her attacks since his own father cannot even stand up for him. Will Joseph ever be able to fulfill his dream of making his grandparents proud and giving them a good life? Is the fulfillment of his dreams worth his sacrifice? Cast: John Arcilla, Nanding Josef, Peewee O'Hara, Yñigo Delen, Maricel Morales, Eda Nolan, Claire Ruiz, Mark Neumann
35	"Bantay Bata"	Nuel Crisostomo Naval	Benson A. Logronio	September 29, 2018	N/A
Roxanne had a happy childhood being cared for by the social workers in a Bantay Bata Children's Village she started living with her aunts. She was passed around from home to home from the age of seven and made to feel alone and unwanted. She soon discovers the reason for her seemingly cursed existence when her father, Raul, gets out of jail. It turns out Roxanne is not only her father's daughter, but also his granddaughter as she is the product of his rape of his own daughter. Roxanne's life will get harder from there. She experiences abuse and mistreatment from her Tita Rosa (Aiko Melendez) and her employer, who look down on her because of the belief that she is born of sin. How will Roxanne accept the truth behind her existence especially when everyone despises her for it? How will she transcend the curse society has put upon her simply because of the way she was brought into this world? Cast: Aiko Melendez, Mary Joy Apostol, Yesha Camile, Mercedes Cabral, Mica Javier, Sue Prado, Raine Salamante, Sonjia Calit, Jade Ecleo, Mike Lloren, Rhed Bustamante, Miel Espinoza, CX Navarro, Martha Comia, Bembol Roco
36	"Skateboard"	Giselle Andres	Akeem Jordan D. Del Rosario and Arah Jell G. Badayos	October 6, 2018	N/A
Margielyn Didal's fascination with skateboarding started the first time she saw a group of skateboarders in her town in Cebu. She found that it came naturally to her after the first time she tried it. Her talent is soon noticed by her friend, Dani, who believes she is better than other long time skateboarders. She was driven by a desire to prove to society, and most especially her parents, that skateboarding is not a waste of time. To her, it is a legitimate sport that can bring a good future to her and her family. However, her dreams were dashed when she suffered an injury while doing a skateboarding trick. This led her parents to stop her from returning to the sport that she loves. Witness how Margie found the courage to go back on a skateboard after her injury and be given the chance to prove to her parents and society the value of skateboarding as a sport. Cast: Elisse Joson, Sharmaine Arnaiz, Rommel Padilla, Jon Lucas, Young JV, Karen Reyes, Myrtle Sarrosa, Arvic Tan, Yasmyne Suarez, Andrez del Rosario
37	"Kidney"	Paco A. Sta. Maria	Arah Jell G. Badayos	October 13, 2018	N/A
Siblings Sherwin and Love have learned to depend to each other throughout the years, especially when their parents broke up. They have leaned on each other through good and bad times, even when they had started their own families, and when Sherwin started using drugs. Love never gave up on Sherwin and kept guiding him. His bad habit would eventually stop as Love got sick and needed a kidney transplant, which only Sherwin can give. However, his employer and his own wife are against him donating his kidney, believing it would not be good for his own health. How will Love's illness affect Sherwin and his vice? Will Sherwin choose to donate his kidney to his sister who loved and cared for him all his life or will he choose his own health, security, and future? Cast: Bianca King, Sandino Martin, Lito Pimentel, Mickey Ferriols, Lovely Rivero, Perla Bautista, Francine Diaz, Kristel Fulgar, Erin Ocampo, Marc Santiago, Marc Acueza, Erika Clemente
38	"Orasan" "Clock"	JP Habac	Benson A. Logronio and Arah Jell G. Badayos	October 20, 2018	N/A
Ever since he was young, Jarel has always been determined to finish his studies and help lift his family out of poverty. He drew inspiration from his mother Fe, who worked as a maid to send her siblings to school, which is why he also became a house helper. However, Fe is against his decision as she does not want him to endure the hardships and judgment she faced while working as a maid. Despite her protests, Jarel will persevere with his choice as he believes it is the only means for him to achieve his dream. Will Jarel be able to show that being a kasambahay is not the end of achieving his dreams or will he prove Fe right that it will only bring him hardship and make others judge him? Cast: Zaijian Jaranilla, Pokwang, Regine Angeles, JB Agustin, Jojo Abellana, Ruby Ruiz, Celine Lim, Amy Nobleza, Jeffrey Hidalgo, Kokoy de Santos, Gem Ramos, Lance Lucido, Jenny Colet, Angel Sy
39	"Anting-Anting" "Earrings"	Nuel Crisostomo Naval	Joan Habana and Arah Jell G. Badayos	October 27, 2018	N/A
Charo is a marine life researcher, who travelled to different places in the Philippines. She meets an old man in Tawi-Tawi who gives her an amulet that she soon believes gives her protection. She puts her faith on the amulet, which ironically led to a series of misfortunate events in her life. She lost her job, mourned for the death of her father, and acquired hypothyroidism. Consequently, she loses herself and begins to hear voices. Charo then makes the ultimate decision to burn her most prized amulet when a friend advised her to throw it away. Charo's condition worsens and she is slowly engulfed in a world of unknown voices that only she can hear. She only finds solace in making songs out of the voices she hears in her head which her elder sister, Manay Jean is against, thinking it will only worsen Charo's condition. Will Bela be left alone by the amulet and the voices she hears? Will Manay Jean be able to come to terms with the song compositions from the unknown voices only her sister can hear? Cast: Bela Padilla, Liza Diño, Mon Confiado, Kathleen Hermosa, Anna Marin, Art Acuña, Danita Paner, Patty Mendoza, Jordan Castillo Jr., Tony Manalo, Jonic Magno
40	"Bawang" "Garlic"	Nuel Crisostomo Naval	Joan Habana and Arah Jell G. Badayos	November 3, 2018	N/A
Christian and his family lead a comfortable life because of their persevering parents Racquel and Robert. Unfortunately, both husband and wife will get hooked on gambling, eventually causing problems for their family and putting a strain on their marriage that will almost lead to their separation. When Racquel gets sick to the point of seeming like being possessed, Christian strives to keep his family together. It does not get easier with the additional financial and personal problems they have to face together as a family, and their parents are unwilling to care for them. Will Christian's family ever be complete again? How will he stop his mother from leaving their family when her case worsens? Cast: Yves Flores, Amy Austria, Allan Paule, Vivoree Esclito, Raquel Monteza, Mitch Naco, Jess Evardone
41	"Drawing"	Mervyn B. Brondial	Mae Rose B. Balanay and Arah Jell G. Badayos	November 10, 2018 (re-aired on March 29, 2020)	N/A
Despite Jane and Rey's sacrifices in guiding their son because of CJ's physical limitations, they fail to see the underlying depression and anger growing inside their adolescent son because no one completely understands him and his confusing world of silence. He turns to hostility and mulls by himself thinking he has no one to really turn to. CJ eventually learns how to draw and will use it as a tool to express himself. He will also have problems in getting along with his Fine Arts course and everyday college life because his teachers and peers can hear and speak. Meanwhile, Jane even enrolls herself in a "sign language" special course to properly guide and support their son. Is the insurmountable love of CJ's family enough to save him? Will CJ's perseverance to study in a normal school pay off? NOTE : The episode has added English subtitles for the benefit of hearing impaired as stated per RA 11106 or Filipino Sign Language Act. Cast: Eula Valdez, Nash Aguas, Ariel Rivera, Yñigo Delen, Franco Rodriguez
42	"Sementeryo" "Cemetery"	Nuel Crisostomo Naval	Benson A. Logronio and Arah Jell G. Badayos	November 17, 2018	N/A
Because of their dire situation, Kikay has wishes of making it big in the world even if her own mother Ruth is resigned to live among the dead to the end of their days. Her father Kokoy, meanwhile makes a living out of selling lumpia and okoy to visitors of their departed loved ones in the cemetery. Kikay forges on despite being looked down upon because of their living conditions, she endures the difficulties of selling sampaguita and candles at the cemetery and studying at the same time. She looks to her Lola Luz for guidance and wisdom in the most trying times. Lola Luz continuously supports Kikay's plans for their family and advises her to follow her dreams. Kikay soon receives proper schooling because of her perseverance and positive outlook and her life eventually changes when the non-governmental organization Childhope Asia Philippines take her in as one of their students. She later on becomes a teacher for the civic group and will finish college. But her family soon encounters another difficulty as her Lola Luz develops complications from her sickness and eventually passes on. Will Kikay be able to finish her studies and fulfill her dream of getting her family out of poverty? Cast: Gina Pareño, Loisa Andalio, Yul Servo, Ynez Veneracion, Yesha Camile, Raikko Mateo, Raine Salamante, Akihiro Blanco, Melizza Jimenez, Miel Espinoza
43	"Mata" "Eye"	Topel Lee	Akeem Jordan D. Del Rosario and Arah Jell G. Badayos	November 24, 2018	N/A
Since childhood, Sarah had premonitions that allowed her to foresee tragedies-including events that have shaken the world. Sarah eventually marries Michael (Edgar Allan Guzman), a loving and patient husband who will care for her despite the challenges to Sarah's physical and spiritual well-being-including her blindness, abnormal vaginal bleeding, and the continuous dark visions she encounters. One day, Sarah is advised by a friend to consult a priest in the Archdiocese of Manila. There, the priest points out that the cause of her unexplainable health situation and visions were dark forces - or what is called "demonic oppression" a lesser form of "demonic possession." The priest also attributes Sarah's situation to her unvented anger towards her parents. Will Sarah ever find peace in her life? Will she be able to fully reconcile with her parents? Cast: Kim Chiu, Edgar Allan Guzman, Irma Adlawan, Richard Quan, Rey PJ Abellana, Jef Gaitan
44	"Teddy Bear"	Raz de la Torre	Akeem Jordan Del Rosario and Arah Jell G. Badayos	December 1, 2018	N/A
The "bread winner" of her family, Sheila has always put her loved ones' needs first. Because of this, it takes a while before she gets into a relationship. She meets the seaman Rey who pursues her. She tries to deflect him because of Rey's reputation as a womanizer. But as fate would have it, they fall for each other and are blessed with a daughter, whom they name Lyka. One day, Sheila discovers that Lyka has HIV, which they traced back to Rey brought about by him sleeping around before they got married. What's even worse is she has contracted HIV herself. Rey's health eventually deteriorates and he dies leaving Sheila to raise Lyka all by herself. She tends to her needs as well as her daughter's in every way possible despite her own condition. Sheila hides the truth from Lyka who she brings up as a normal child for fear of judgement from society. Lyka grows up loved and cared for and will only know the truth after her mother discloses the truth when her first period came. Will the mother and child find resolution for their health problem? Will society ever be able to accept people with HIV? Is Sheila's love enough to protect Lyka from the ill ways of society? Cast: Shaina Magdayao, RK Bagatsing, Belle Mariano, Jana Agoncillo, Yayo Aguila, Simon Ibarra, Isay Alvarez, Minco Fabregas, Celine Lim, Alora Sasam, Johan Santos, Noel Colet, Jenny Colet, Sonjia Calit
45	"Korona" "Crown"	Giselle Andres	Jaymar Santos Castro and Arah Jell G. Badayos	December 8, 2018	N/A
Rosedel and Armin were inseparable when they were kids. They grew up having a love for family and innate appreciation for their native Sibuyan in Romblon. They vowed to take care of each other, their loved ones, and their beloved town of Sibuyan until they grow up. When the siblings set foot in Manila for their college education, they also began a life vastly different from their life in the province. Meanwhile, their parents and Titing were overjoyed that their children were able to go to school in Manila, especially when they finished Commerce and Civil Engineering, respectively. When Rosedel eventually bears a child and builds a family early on in life, this causes a rift between the inseparable siblings. Rosedel decides to stay behind in Manila to raise her child while Armin goes back to Sibuyan. One day, a big mining company brings chaos to the land and threaten the natural resources of their town. Some townsfolk decide to shrug it off because of the mining company's influence. Armin's love of nature and beloved town causes a stir with the big mining company. Because Rosedel fears for their safety, she resolves to leave her brother alone in the fight even if her heart yearns for justice. But when a tragedy strikes her family, she changes her mind and takes on the challenge her brother started. Will Rosedel and Armin put aside their rift and reconcile? Is it too late for Sibuyan's natural resources to be saved? Cast: Arjo Atayde, Ria Atayde, Tetchie Agbayani, Ernie Garcia, Alex Medina, Angelo Ilagan, Gigi Locsin, Jacqui Leus
46	"Dalandan" "Orange"	Frasco Mortiz	Joan Habana and Arah Jell G. Badayos	December 15, 2018	N/A
At the age of 10, Nilo already knew of true love, thanks to how his parents brought him up. His world would revolve around his family until one day, he meets Bonifacia who is 32 years his senior. However, what started out as innocent admiration for the woman, would later develop into love, a fact that their families have a hard time coming to terms to. Nilo's love knows no bounds and perseveres to be with his beloved. He gathers the courage to pursue Bonifacia when the woman whom he considers his life's "princess" becomes a widow. Bonifacia eventually becomes endeared to Nilo because of his persistence. The two finally become a couple but hide it from their own families and flee to Puerto Galera where nobody knows them. Despite this, their relationship still suffers the local town's criticisms which deeply disheartens Bonifacia. Will Nilo and Bonifacia's families be able to fully accept their relationship? Is it true that true love knows no age? Cast: Ejay Falcon, Zaijian Jaranilla, Marco Masa, Allan Paule, Lovely Rivero, Manuel Chua, Jojo Abellana, Maika Rivera, Patrick Sugui, Igi Boy Flores, Kyra Custodio, Kokoy de Santos, Faye Alhambra, Lorna Tolentino
47	"Red Lipstick"	Nuel Crisostomo Naval	Benson A. Logronio and Arah Jell G. Badayos	December 22, 2018	N/A
Jona grew up resenting her mother for being too busy with the family's livelihood and developing an addiction for gambling and drugs. As Jona is pushed to the limits, she eventually elopes with her boyfriend Ruben, leaves her family, and vows never to end up like her mother. When Nita loses her husband, she falls into a state of depression. Jona decides to forget her past resentments upon learning of this and returns home to take care of Nita. When it becomes apparent that Nita has lost her sense of reality and becomes forgetful, her family discovers that she is suffering from Alzheimer's disease. One day, Nita is gone for two whole weeks. How did Nita's family fight the biggest battle of their lives? Cast: Sylvia Sanchez, Nonie Buencamino, James Blanco, Mickey Ferriols, Nikki Valdez, Mary Joy Apostol, Alexa Ilacad, Michael Rivero, Marc Acueza, Claire Ruiz, Toby Alejar, Tom Doromal, Axel Torres, JB Agustin, Raikko Mateo, Jacob Dionisio, Jhai'ho, Ced Torrecarion, Marnie Lapus, Boots Anson-Roa
