= You're My Home (TV series) =

2015 Philippine television drama series

- Title card
- Genre: Melodrama; Romance; Family drama
- Created by: Olivia M. Lamasan; Arah Jell Badayos
- Developed by: ABS-CBN Studios
- Written by: Sonny Calvento; Arden Rod Condez
- Directed by: Jerry Lopez Sineneng; Garry Javier Fernando; Elfren P. Vibar
- Starring: Richard Gomez; Dawn Zulueta; Jessy Mendiola; JC de Vera; Sam Concepcion; Paul Salas; Mika dela Cruz; Tonton Gutierrez; Assunta De Rossi; Precious Lara Quigaman
- Opening theme: "You're My Home" by Angeline Quinto
- Composer: Odette Quesada
- Country of origin: Philippines
- Original language: Tagalog
- No. of episodes: 98 (list of episodes)

Production
- Executive producers: Carlo Katigbak; Cory Vidanes; Laurenti Dyogi; Malou Santos; Des De Guzman
- Producers: Fe Catherine D.V. Ancheta; Roda Catolico dela Cerna
- Editors: Aries Pascual; Emerson Torres
- Running time: 27–37 minutes
- Production company: Star Creatives

Original release
- Network: ABS-CBN
- Release: November 9, 2015 – March 23, 2016

You're My Home is a Philippine television drama romantic series broadcast by ABS-CBN. Directed by Jerry Lopez Sineneng, Garry Javier Fernando and Elfren P. Vibar, it stars Richard Gomez, Dawn Zulueta, Jessy Mendiola, JC de Vera, Sam Concepcion, Paul Salas, Mika dela Cruz, Tonton Gutierrez, Assunta De Rossi and Precious Lara Quigaman. It aired on the network's Primetime Bida line up and worldwide on TFC from November 9, 2015 to March 23, 2016, replacing Pinoy Big Brother: 737 and was replaced by Jane the Virgin.

Originally titled as Will Never Say Goodbye, it is an intimate study on a family break-up and its possible reunion.

The series is streaming online on YouTube.

== Plot ==
The story follows the Fontanilla family and their eldest daughter Grace (Jessy Mendiola). After many years of living in simplicity, the lives of the Fontanillas suddenly changed when Gabriel (Richard Gomez) handles the frustrated homicide case against Christian Vergara (JC de Vera), the son of a powerful senator. The young Grace turns rebellious after realizing that her father Gabriel and her mother Marian (Dawn Zulueta) had no time for their children anymore. One night, Grace tries to leave the house, and her brother Rahm runs after her, leaving Vince alone inside. The Fontanillas discovers that Vince is missing and their family will put to test. Twelve years later, the Fontanilla family faces the consequences of Vince's disappearance. Grace's parents are separated. Marian works on her own clothing line, while Gabriel finds love on Roni (Precious Lara Quigaman), a police officer who handles Vince's kidnapping case. Rahm (Sam Concepcion), at an early age, already has a son and a wife. Grace continues to move on with her life, still blaming herself for what happened to her family. Fate comes into play when Grace crosses paths with Ken (Paul Salas), and Marian learns that Ken is her missing son Vince. Things become worse as Grace falls in love with Christian, the man who got convicted for the kidnapping of her brother.

== Cast and characters ==
=== Main cast ===
==== Fontanilla Family ====
- Richard Gomez as Atty. Gabriel Fontanilla
- Dawn Zulueta as Marian Angeles-Fontanilla
- Jessy Mendiola as Grace A. Fontanilla-Vergara
  - Belle Mariano as young Grace
- Sam Concepcion as Rahm A. Fontanilla
  - Bugoy Cariño as young Rahm
- Paul Salas as Vince A. Fontanilla / Kennedy "Ken" A. Cabanero
  - Raikko Mateo as young Vince
- Mika dela Cruz as Jennifer - Vince's bestfriend . later in the series she fell in love with Vince and has been his girlfriend.
- Precious Lara Quigaman as SPO3 Veronica "Roni" Tesnado - Gabriel's fiancee but didn't end up to marry each other.
- Assunta de Rossi as Jackie Apostol-Cabanero - Ken / Vince's foster mom.

==== Vergara Family ====
- JC de Vera as Christian Vergara - son of Victor and Teresa. He was responsible for Vince's abduction when Vince was a kid. Christian falls in love with Grace. After confessing his sins to the Fontanilla family about the abduction of Vince, he was killed when he gets electrocuted by falling electrical pole into a guardrail barrier to save Grace and Gabriel from danger. After his death, he became a father of Grace's son.
- Tonton Gutierrez as Victor Vergara - Christian's father
- Jobelle Salvador as Teresa Vergara - Christian's mother

=== Supporting cast ===
- Claire Ruiz as Clarisse Velez-Fontanilla - Rahm's wife
- Rowell Santiago as Mike Macaraig
- Elisse Joson as Alexis Madrigal
- Peewee O'Hara as Nanay Dolores
- Minnie Aguilar as Sally
- Marina Benipayo as Althea Asuncion
- Evangeline Pascual as Cassandra
- Hyubs Azarcon as Ramon Tesnado
- Denise Joaquin as Didith
- Angelo Ilagan as Jawo
- Crispin Pineda as Ely Marasigan
- EJ Jallorina as Ken's friend
- Bryan Homecillo as Ken's friend
- Miggy Campbell as Yuan

=== Guest cast ===
- Kyline Alcantara as Janice
- Chinggoy Alonzo as Atty. Ferdinand Vasquez
- Tony Mabesa as Mr. Reyes
- Jong Cuenco as Atty. Manlapuz
- Minco Fabregas as Sandro
- Josh Ivan Morales as Franco de Villa
- Janice Jurado as Mrs. Josefa Jamillano
- Michael Roy Jornales as Christian's friend
- Junjun Quintana as Ryan Montes
- Rufa Mi as Lydia
- Rubi Rubi as Chona
- Negi as Georgette
- Mitoy Yonting as Atty. Delfin del Rosario
- Lui Manansala as Mercy
- Prince Stefan
- Kim Molina
- Dionne Monsanto as Mildred de Villa
- Maila Gumila as Fely
- Devon Seron as Beauty
- CX Navarro as Tikboy
- Arnold Reyes as Santiago
- Jef Gaitan as Maureen Enriquez
- Rochelle Barrameda as Mrs. Madrigal
- Jon Lucas as Lance
- Paco Evangelista as Lito San Pablo
- Ronnie Quizon as Mando Dimalanta
- Zeppi Borromeo as Roel Dimalanta
- Boboy Garrovillo as Cesar Acosta
- Glenda Garcia as Anna Acosta
- Chienna Filomeno as Felicity Flores
- Kyra Custodio as Drunk woman
- Angelica Yap as Lourdes Marcelo
- Nina Ricci Alagao
- Vangie Labalan as Oda Tilay
- Bangs Garcia as Emma
- Fifth Solomon as Barbie
- Dante Ponce as Mark
- Rustica Carpio as Elvie
- Ruby Ruiz as Wilma
- Leandro Baldemor as Jose

== Ratings ==
KANTAR MEDIA NATIONAL TV RATINGS (10:00PM PST)
PILOT EPISODE	FINALE EPISODE	PEAK	AVERAGE	SOURCE
8.8%	14.4%	14.4%	TBA	

== Broadcast ==
=== International broadcast ===
Country	Network	Title
United States	KIKU	You’re My Home

=== Re-runs ===
The show aired re-runs on Jeepney TV from July 31 to October 11, 2017 (replacing the re-runs of All of Me and was replaced by the re-runs of Two Wives 2014); from June 7 to October 11, 2020 (replacing the re-runs of Till I Met You and was replaced by the re-runs of Tanging Yaman); and from November 12, 2022 to June 24, 2023 (replacing the re-runs of Doble Kara and was replaced by the re-runs of Kung Ako'y Iiwan Mo).

== See also ==
- List of programs broadcast by ABS-CBN
- List of ABS-CBN Studios original drama series
- List of programs broadcast by Jeepney TV
