= Rufa =

Rufa or Ruffa is a given name. Notable people with the name include:

- Rufa Mae Quinto (born 1978), Filipina actress, comedian, television host, and singer
- Rufa Mi (born 1988), Filipina comedian, presenter, actress, and singer
- Ruffa Gutierrez (born 1974), Filipina actress and model
