= Norman King =

Norm or Norman King may refer to:

- Norm King (1919–1992), Australian Labor Party politician
- Norman King (Aeta), Filipino indigenous advance
- Norman King (bowls), English international lawn bowler
- Norman King (cricketer) (1915–1973), Australian cricketer
- Norman King (New Zealand politician) (1914–2002), New Zealand Labour Party politician
- Norman King (Royal Navy officer) (1933–2013), British admiral
