= Devon Seron =

Filipino actress (born 1993)

- Born: May 20, 1993 (age 33); Cebu City, Philippines
- Education: STI College; Colegio de San Juan de Letran
- Occupations: Actress, TV personality, endorser, dancer, singer
- Years active: 2010–present
- Agent(s): Star Magic (2010–2018) GMA Artist Center (2011; 2018–2020)
- Website: Devon Seron on Instagram

Devon Seron (born May 20, 1993) is a Filipina actress and television personality.

== Personal life ==
Seron grew up in Cebu, Philippines. Despite their financial issues, her parents decided to move her to an expensive private school close to their home to minimize her walking distance. Big Brother offered to pay the remainder of her tuition so she could graduate high school. Seron was chosen among thousands of other contestants from different regions of the country to enter the PBB house. On week 6, her mother joined her inside the house disguised as a house player in return of her college scholarship funds.

Seron continues to work while finishing her degree in Business Management.

== Career ==
Seron started as a contestant in a reality TV show dubbed as "Bubbly Promdi ng Cebu" and was voted as the Teen Big 4th Placer on the final night of Pinoy Big Brother: Teen Clash 2010. Following her success, Devon signed exclusively to be one of the members of ABS-CBN contracted talents.

After her stint in PBB, she was cast in ABS-CBN's teen variety show Shoutout!. She then was in the hit youth oriented dance-drama series Good Vibes. Devon played the role of Mariel on the 2011 remake of the TV series, Mula sa Puso.

She was also part of ABS-CBN's afternoon TV series, Angelito: Batang Ama and Angelito: Ang Bagong Yugto in 2011–2012. She then played young Bernadette on the TV series, Apoy sa Dagat. Devon was cast as Rosario in Maria Mercedes remake topbilled by Jessy Mendiola. She played the role of Riri in Moon of Desire.

In 2016, Seron was part of It's Showtime girl group "Girl Trends" and recently left the group to focus more on her career. She had one of the lead roles in Regal Film's horror film, Pwera Usog that was released on March 8, 2017.

She was chosen to play her first lead role of Kim Soriano in the film "You with Me". She spent almost a month in South Korea to shoot the film.

In 2018 she was among the lead stars of the Regal Film's coming-of-age film WalWal and top billed the musical film Bakwit Boys.

In March 2018, Seron confirmed she did not renew her contract with ABS-CBN and decided to sign an exclusive contract with GMA Artist Center.

Seron is also the longest brand endorser of the Filipino phone brand, MyPhone since 2012.

== Filmography ==
=== Films ===
Year	Title	Role	Notes	Ref.
2012	The Reunion	Paola dela Torre		
2014	Maybe This Time	Abby		
2015	Halik sa Hangin	Debbie		
2015	Haunted Mansion	Allison		
2016	Everything About Her	Jenny		
2016	You With Me	Kim Soriano		
2017	I Love You to Death	Venus		
2017	Can't Help Falling in Love	Tet		
2017	Pwera Usog	Luna		
2018	Walwal	Trina		
2018	Bakwit Boys	Rose		
2018	Man in My Dreams	Ginny		
2024	Mamay: A Journey to Greatness			

=== Drama series ===
Year	Title	Role	Notes	Ref.
2011	Maynila	Olga		
2011	Mula sa Puso	Mariel		
2011	Good Vibes	Maribeth Tamayo	main cast, dubbed as The No. 1 Pare	
2011	Angelito: Batang Ama	Teresa "Tere" Santos		
2012	Maalaala Mo Kaya: MMK: Baunan; MMK: School Uniform	Cacai; Eden Rose	Season 20, Episode 13; Season 20, Episode 22	
2012	Angelito: Ang Bagong Yugto	Teresa "Tere" Santos	sequel of Angelito	
2013	Maalaala Mo Kaya: MMK: Bahay; MMK: Picture Frame	Aurora young Grace	Season 21, Episode 116; Season 21, Episode 137	
2013	Maynila	Gelli		
2013	Apoy sa Dagat	young Bernadette Lamayre	special participation	
2013	Maria Mercedes	Rosario Alegre	is a remake of María Mercedes	
2014	Maalaala Mo Kaya: Kwintas	Chiquita	Season 22, Episode 167	
2014	Moon of Desire	Riri Bustamante		
2014	Forevermore	Jasmine	guest cast	
2014	Ipaglaban Mo!	Angelina	Episode 23: Amin Ang Pamana Mo	
2015	You're My Home	Beauty	guest cast	
2015	Ipaglaban Mo!	Ella	Episode 38: Sa Aking Paggising	
2015	All of Me	Rachel Manalo	guest cast	
2016	Maalaala Mo Kaya: Itlog	Connie	Season 24, Episode 1	
2016	Be My Lady	Lotlot		
2017	Maalaala Mo Kaya: Bituin	Arah	Season 25, Episode 7	
2017	Ipaglaban Mo!	Betty	Episode 145: Hipag	
2018	The One That Got Away	Diane		
2018	Magpakailanman: A Blind Love Story	Julie		
2018	Wish Ko Lang: Kadena ng Kamalasan	Charm		
2018	Wagas: Nakikita ng Puso	Rowena	The Obet and Rowena Story	
2018	Asawa Ko, Karibal Ko	Maya Santiago		
2019	Bukas May Kahapon			
2019	Dahil sa Pag-Ibig	Chin-chin		
2019–present	Pepito Manaloto	Mary	recurring character	
2020–2021	Paano ang Pasko?	Joy		
2020–2021	Paano ang Pangako?	Joy	main cast member	
2023–present	Good Will	Sarah	main cast member	

=== Variety shows ===
Year	Title	Role	Notes	Ref.
2010–2018	ASAP	Herself / Co-Host / Performer		
2019	SMAC Pinoy Ito!	Herself / Guest		

=== Reality shows ===
Year	Title	Role	Notes	Ref.
2010	Pinoy Big Brother: Teen Clash 2010	Herself / Housemate	PBB: Teen Clash 2010 4th Big Placer	

=== Online program ===
Year	Title	Role	Notes	Ref.
2017–present	Tropa Tambayan Live!	Herself / Host	Main Host	

== Accolades ==
Year	Award	Category	Notable Work	Result	Ref.
2011	ASAP Pop Viewers' Choice Awards	Pop Tween Popsies (with James Reid)	Good Vibes	Won	
2015	Starmometer Awards	100 Most Beautiful Women in the Philippines	—N/a	No. 83	
