= Pwera Usog =

- Theatrical movie poster
- Directed by: Jason Paul Laxamana
- Written by: Jason Paul Laxamana
- Produced by: Lily Y. Monteverde; Roselle Y. Monteverde
- Starring: Joseph Marco; Sofia Andres; Albie Casiño; Devon Seron; Kiko Estrada; Aiko Melendez; Eula Valdes
- Cinematography: Rommel Sales; Agung Bagus
- Edited by: Ilsa Malsi
- Music by: Paulo Protacio
- Production companies: Regal Entertainment; LargaVista Entertainment
- Distributed by: Regal Films
- Release date: March 8, 2017
- Running time: 93 minutes
- Country: Philippines
- Language: Filipino

Pwera Usog (trans. “go away, curse!”) is a 2017 Filipino supernatural horror film directed by Jason Paul Laxamana. It was produced under Regal Entertainment. Its title is derived from a local Filipino superstition to banish an ailment caused by a person greeting someone, especially an infant.

== Plot ==
Jean is a teenage prankster who posts her activities on social media partly to cope with her troubled relationship with her father. While filming a prank at an abandoned building with her friends Bobby and Val, they come across a homeless woman whom they victimize. Terrified, the woman jumps off the building, to the trio's horror. However, when they go to the site where the woman fell, they find no body below.

Jean is subsequently haunted by a malevolent shadow figure at her house. In separate incidents, the spirit also kills Bobby by drowning him in a toilet and attacks Val, who narrowly survives thanks to an amulet she has worn since childhood to ward off usog. Horrified, Jean along with her friend Sherwin, go to the abandoned building and come across Minda, a local faith healer, and her apprentice Quintin. They tell Jean that she is being cursed by the spirit of Catalina, a malevolent witch who preys on children and possessed Quintin's sister Luna, who is revealed to be the homeless woman Jean had pranked, years ago.

Resolving to end Catalina's curse once and for all and free Luna from her control, Jean and Minda battle Catalina in the spirit dimension, but Minda is overwhelmed and dies from her injuries. Jean, however, manages to vanquish Catalina, gaining Minda's abilities in the process. Luna is reunited with Quintin, who succeeds Minda as the local faith healer.

Jean, moved by her experience, quits pranking and reconciles with her father. While on a date with Sherwin, she comes across a homeless girl. As Jean helps her while Sherwin is away, she sees a shadow figure that lunges at her, as the scene cuts to black.

== Cast ==
- Joseph Marco as Sherwin
- Sofia Andres as Jean
- Albie Casiño as Bobby
- Devon Seron as Luna
- Kiko Estrada as Quintin
- Aiko Melendez as Minda
- Eula Valdes as Catalina
- Erlinda Villalobos as Magda
- Cherise Castro as Val
- Gelo Alvaran as Young Quintin
- Pontri as Dr. Yu
- Jonas Panio as Street Kid
- Donna Persona as Young Girl's Mother
- Ashley Sarmiento as Young Luna
- Rommel Padilla as Jean's Father

== Production ==
Pwera Usog was directed by Jason Paul Laxamana’ under the film studio, Regal Entertainment. The members of the cast of Pwera Usog was selected by Regal Entertainment rather than Laxamana. Laxamana, whose first horror film was Pwera Usog, says it is a challenge directing a film belonging to the horror genre and mentioned how there must be a proper build up before executing the "moment of horror". He directed the film in the premise on how to startle people who have seen horror films and other scary videos online.

The film's theme is centered on usog an affliction in Filipino superstition associated with being greeted by a stranger. Pwera Usog was targeted towards a young demographic particularly the "urban millennial". Laxamana incorporated technology and social media, as well as used a cast composed of mainly millennial to connect with the target demographic and introduce to them the concept of usog without alienating them.

Laxamana described the direction of the film as deviating from Asian horror-type of films the Philippine audience is used to which employs shock and surprise tactics and promise the audience of more "action scenes" which he says will surprise viewers but leave them laughing at themselves at their own reactions. The director said he was also inspired from a "side" of him for the directorial decision of adding "disgusting scenes" to Pwera Usog and narrated on how he liked to scare his family and friends as a child by describing scenarios that will make them grossed out or uncomfortable.

== Release ==
Pwera Usog was among the three films Regal Entertainment planned to submit as an entry at the 2016 Metro Manila Film Festival. The film was not selected as one of the eight official entries of the film festival that ran from December 25, 2016, to January 7, 2017. The film had an official trailer which garnered at least 5 million views online. On March 8, 2017, the film had its theatrical debut in Philippine cinemas.

The film was screened at the 17th Neuchâtel International Fantastic Film Festival in Switzerland, a genre film festival which ran from June 30 to July 8, 2017.

== Reception ==
The Cinema Evaluation Board gave Pwera Usog an "A" rating.
