= Two Wives (2014 TV series) =

2014–15 Philippine television drama series

- Title card
- Genre: Melodrama; Family drama; Romance
- Created by: ABS-CBN Studios; Gina Marissa Tagasa
- Based on: Two Wives by Lee Yoo-seon
- Directed by: FM Reyes; Raymund B. Ocampo; Richard I. Arellano
- Starring: Kaye Abad; Jason Abalos; Erich Gonzales
- Opening theme: "Anong Nangyari Sa Ating Dalawa?" by Morissette
- Composer: Joven Tan
- Country of origin: Philippines
- Original language: Filipino
- No. of episodes: 110

Production
- Executive producers: Carlo L. Katigbak; Cory V. Vidanes; Laurenti M. Dyogi; Ruel S. Bayani; Katrina Juban
- Producer: Rizza Gonzales Ebriega
- Editor: Bernie Diasanta
- Running time: 30-45 minutes
- Production companies: RSB Production Unit; Seoul Broadcasting System

Original release
- Network: ABS-CBN
- Release: October 13, 2014 – March 13, 2015

Related
- Halik (2018)

Two Wives is a Philippine television drama series broadcast by ABS-CBN. The series is based on the 2009 South Korean drama series of the same title. Directed by FM Reyes, Raymund B. Ocampo and Richard I. Arellano, it stars Kaye Abad, Jason Abalos and Erich Gonzales. It aired on the network's Primetime Bida line up and worldwide on TFC from October 13, 2014 to March 13, 2015, replacing Sana Bukas Pa ang Kahapon and was replaced by Bridges of Love.

The series is streaming online on YouTube.

== Synopsis ==
Yvonne, the typical homemaker who prioritizes her family over everything, is married to Victor. They have a son, and they are the epitome of a happy family, until Yvonne discovers that her husband is having an affair with another girl named Janine.

Victor’s failed business forced him to work in the flower farm of Janine, a single mother. He was later driven to accept her other unusual job offer – he is to pretend to be a father to her daughter. As days passed, Victor found himself getting attracted and falling in love with Janine.

When Yvonne finds out about Victor’s extramarital affair, Janine distances herself away from him. But Yvonne and Victor are unable to patch things up. Victor reckons that he is really in love with Janine.

Yvonne and Victor eventually get their annulment. Victor chooses to be with Janine, and he decides to start a new life by marrying her. Meanwhile, Yvonne also moves on and the promise of a second chance in love comes into the picture through Albert, a charming insurance executive.

Not long after, Victor gets into a car accident and loses all of his memories of Janine. He believes he is still married to Yvonne. This incident is a game changer as it brings Victor back to the past that he escaped from.

For her son’s welfare, Yvonne is forced to pretend to be the wife. Yvonne is forced to pretend to be the wife that Victor remembers, even if she now appears to be the mistress. This devastates Janine, as she is pregnant with Victor's baby.

This Filipino adaptation of an original Korean format promises to be full of compelling situations and emotional fireworks.

== Cast and characters ==
=== Main cast ===
- Kaye Abad as Yvonne Aguiluz-Guevarra / Yvonne Aguiluz-Medrano
- Jason Abalos as Victor Guevarra
- Erich Gonzales as Janine Arguello-Guevarra / Janine Arguello-Celdran

=== Supporting cast ===
- Patrick Garcia as Albert Medrano
- Rayver Cruz as Dale G. del Valle
- Daniel Matsunaga as Kenjie Celdran
- CX Navarro as Marcus A. Guevarra
- Faye Alhambra as Audrey A. del Valle
- Isay Alvarez-Seña as Carmen Aguiluz
- Robert Seña as Jaime Aguiluz
- Tanya Gomez as Sonia Guevarra
- Regine Angeles as Doris Guevarra-Alcancez
- Kitkat as Mimi Olasco
- Melai Cantiveros as Carla
- Jean Saburit as Daria Alcancez
- Alex Medina as Marlon Aguiluz
- Vandolph Quizon as Gary Alcancez
- Peter Serrano as Shakira
- Paul Jake Castillo as Louie
- Sharmaine Arnaiz as Natividad "Vida" Arguello-Soler
- Carla Martinez as Rosalinda "Sandy" Gopez-del Valle
- Natasha Cabrera as Tess

=== Guest cast ===
- Dina Bonnevie as Minerva Arguello
- Yam Concepcion as Michelle Olasco
- Diane Medina as Phoebe Sales
- John Medina as Albert's friend
- Jahren Estorque as Tisoy
- John Spainhour
- Franco Daza
- Jess Mendoza as Chito
- Marissa Sanchez

== Broadcast ==
The series aired on ABS-CBN from October 13, 2014 to March 13, 2015.

It aired re-runs on Jeepney TV from September 19 to December 7, 2016 (replacing the re-runs of Apoy sa Dagat); from October 16 to December 29, 2017 (replacing the re-runs of Magkaribal); from June 3 to August 16, 2019 (replacing the re-runs of Gandang Gabi Vice); from September 12, 2020 to January 9, 2021 (replacing the re-runs of Halik); and from January 1 to September 10, 2023 (replacing the re-runs of Mula sa Puso 2011).

== See also ==
- List of programs broadcast by ABS-CBN
- List of ABS-CBN Studios original drama series
- List of programs broadcast by Jeepney TV
