= Kiko Matos =

Filipino-Portuguese actor (born 1990)

- Born: Francisco Manabat Perestrelo De Matos; September 22, 1990 (age 35)
- Other name: Kiko Matos
- Occupations: Actor; mixed martial artist; content creator
- Years active: 2013–present
- Height: 1.75 m (5 ft 9 in)
- Children: 1

Francisco Manabat Perestrelo De Matos (born September 22, 1990) is a Filipino-Portuguese actor and mixed martial artist. He is known for his work in Philippine independent films. Some of his early film roles include Babagwa (2013), Mumbai Love (2014), Hukluban (2014) and "Sino nga ba si Pangkoy Ong (2015).

== Early life ==
Matos is of Filipino and Portuguese descent. He was raised in the Philippines and experienced a difficult adolescence due to family circumstances, including the physical separation of his parents while his father worked in Portugal. He later reconciled with his mother. Before entering show business, Matos worked for a real estate company. He later said he had long intended to pursue acting.

At the age of 20, Matos had been a "rebellious teenager", often impatient and acting without thinking about how his words or actions affected others, and he said the most difficult part of his youth was becoming involved with gangs and street fights. He had become more responsible and focused on his personal and professional goals.

== Career ==
Matos began acting in independent films after auditioning for local film festivals, including Cinemalaya. His early film appearances included Babagwa (2013), Mumbai Love (2014), Hukluban (2014), and Sino nga ba si Pangkoy Ong (2015). He played a lead role in the cross-cultural romantic comedy Mumbai Love, opposite Solenn Heussaff, and described the project as a formative experience. He also denied reports of a kidnapping incident during the film's production.

Matos starred in Gil Portes' Hukluban, an official entry in the 2014 Sineng Pambansa Horror Plus Film Festival, which drew attention for its gothic themes and physical demands. He continued to take on character-driven roles in independent cinema and appeared in stage productions, including The Glass Menagerie.

In 2016, Matos appeared in the historical biopic Ang Hapis at Himagsik ni Hermano Puli, directed by Gil Portes, who also directed Hukluban. He played Don Joaquin Ortega, an alcalde mayor in Lucban, Quezon. Matos described his character as someone who tried to maintain peace in the town and said the role was a positive experience.

Matos appeared in the film Born Beautiful (2019), alongside Martin del Rosario, which included a few intimate scenes. Despite circulating rumors in entertainment blind items suggesting otherwise, both actors maintained that the reports were false. Public perception of Matos has sometimes been controversial, but colleagues have described him as polite and professional. The film was produced and directed by Perci Intalan, who dismissed the blind item as exaggerated and preposterous.

In 2018, he appeared in the ToFarm Film Festival entries Mga Anak ng Kamote and Alimuom, and remained active in independent film projects rather than committing to exclusive network contracts.

Matos later joined the cast of the television series FPJ's Batang Quiapo, where his character Erik exited the series during a major storyline in 2024.

Alongside acting, Matos pursued mixed martial arts. In 2016, he faced actor Baron Geisler in an exhibition MMA match that ended in a draw. He later competed professionally, winning his first bout in the Universal Reality Combat Championship (URCC) in 2017 after defeating Billy Jack Magana Sanchez via first-round submission at the Araneta Coliseum.

In 2020, Matos accepted additional URCC matches, including a scheduled bout against rapper Damsa, serving as a substitute fighter and continuing his involvement in professional MMA.

== Personal life ==
In 2018, Matos became a father when his partner Maria Martinez, gave birth to their daughter. He later discussed in interviews how he adjusted to parenthood.

Matos has also stated that he experimented with illegal drugs during his teenage years and said he stopped and changed his lifestyle.

== Controversies ==
In 2016, a video showing a confrontation between Matos and actor Baron Geisler at a bar in Quezon City circulated widely online. Both later gave differing accounts of the incident in media interviews, and subsequent public exchanges between them were reported in entertainment outlets, eventually leading to a mixed martial arts bout.

In July 2021, Kiko Matos got into a fight with social media personality Rendon Labador at the Battle of the YouTubers event. The problem started when Matos shouted at Labador, saying "bobo ka!" (You're stupid!). Labador then punched him. A video of the fight appeared online, and it also showed Labador thanking his fans and team before things happened. Two years later, in 2023, Matos talked about Labador again after Labador's social media accounts were temporarily suspended, which caught people's attention.

== Filmography ==
=== Selected films ===
- Babagwa (2013)
- Mumbai Love (2014)
- Hukluban (2014)
- Sino nga ba si Pangkoy Ong (2015)
- Expressway (2016)
- Ang Hapis at Himagsik ni Hermano Puli (2016)
- The Super Parental Guardians (2016)
- Mga Anak ng Kamote (2018)
- Alimuom (2018)
- Born Beautiful (2019)
- Kiss (2019; short film)
- Isa Pa with Feelings (2019)
- Mindanao (2019)
- And the Breadwinner Is... (2024)

=== Television ===
- FPJ's Batang Quiapo (2024)
- Family Feud Philippines (2022)
- Wish Ko Lang! (2022)

== Awards ==
- Best Actor – 1st Film School Manila Film Festival, for the short film Kiss (2019).
