= Norman King (Aeta) =

Filipino advocate (born 1988)

- Born: 1988 (age 37–38); Pampanga, Philippines
- Known for: First Aeta graduate of the University of the Philippines Manila

Norman King (born 1988) is a Filipino indigenous advocate and member of the Aeta people. He is best known for becoming the first Aeta graduate of the University of the Philippines Manila.

== Biography ==
=== Early life ===
Norman King was born in 1988 at the foothills of Mount Pinatubo in Pampanga, Philippines, a region long inhabited by the Aeta people. He is the eldest of seven siblings in his family. His parents are Warlita King and Roman King; his mother earned a living growing vegetables and fruits, while his father worked as a driver for the late Justice Eliezer de los Santos. The family's surname "King" was given to his grandfather by an American soldier, Mark King, who admired his leadership. Among the Aeta, who traditionally did not have fixed surnames, the name has since come to signify leadership lineage and ancestral heritage within his family.

In 1991, the devastating eruption of Mount Pinatubo forced his family and fellow Aeta villagers to flee their ancestral lands and resettle in the lowlands. Growing up in an Aeta community, Norman experienced the effects of poverty and displacement early in life, including his family's resettlement after the 1991 eruption.

=== Early education and career ===
After completing his primary education at Marcos Elementary School in Mabalacat City, Norman King graduated from Angeles City National Trade High School in 2004. After finishing high school in 2004, Norman King was sent to Metro Manila, where he worked as a deliver boy at a framing shop in Bangkal, Makati while taking up a vocational course in computer technology in the evenings. He also completed on‑the‑job training at the Government Service Insurance System office in Pasay, graduating with third honors in his computer technician class. He became a computer technician in 2005 and, by 2008 he secured a position at a business process outsourcing company.

=== Graduating in UP Manila ===
Nearly a decade later after graduating from high school, Norman enrolled at the University of the Philippines Manila (UP Manila) at the age of 23, with the support of Cynthia Neri Zayas, PhD, who coordinated with his father to help him pursue higher education. His education was financially supported through a combination of the university stipend, assistance from the Diwang Magdalo Foundation, and allowances from his father. In 2017, Norman King became the first Aeta to graduate from the UP Manila, earning a Bachelor of Science in Behavioral Science.

During the commencement exercises of UP Manila in 2017, Norman received his diploma wearing a bahag, the traditional loincloth of the Aeta people, as a way of affirming and representing his indigenous heritage on a national stage. His choice of attire was widely covered in the media as a symbolic assertion of cultural identity and pride alongside his academic achievement. The moment received widespread media coverage and went viral on social media.

== Television and media portrayals ==
=== Maalaala Mo Kaya episode ===
Norman King's story has received attention in various forms of Philippine media beyond news reports of his academic achievements. In 2018, the long‑running drama anthology Maalaala Mo Kaya (MMK) aired an episode titled "Equal Rights", which dramatized the lives of King and his father, Roman King. The episode featured well‑known actors portraying Aeta characters, but it drew both praise for bringing attention to the experiences of indigenous peoples and criticism for its use of non‑Aeta actors whose skin tones were darkened with makeup, a practice that many viewers and commentators described as "blackface" and culturally insensitive. The portrayal of his father's role in community affairs also sparked debate among some groups who felt the narrative oversimplified or misrepresented aspects of local history.

=== Safeguard commercial ===
Norman's personal journey was dramatized in a television commercial produced by Safeguard, and described by SPOT.ph as one of the memorable ads of 2018. Titled Pabaon sa Buhay (Protection for Life), the video, in which he portrayed himself, recounted his struggles and triumphs, including his choice to wear a traditional bahag at his UP Manila commencement exercises, and was shared widely on social media for its inspirational portrayal of identity and perseverance.

=== Eat Bulaga! appearance ===
In 2020, King appeared on Eat Bulaga!'s popular segment "Bawal Judgmental," where he discussed his personal journey as an Indigenous Filipino, including his early work and study experiences, his pursuit of higher education, and his desire to amplify the voices of Aeta and other indigenous communities.
