= JC Santos =

Filipino theater and television actor (born 1988)

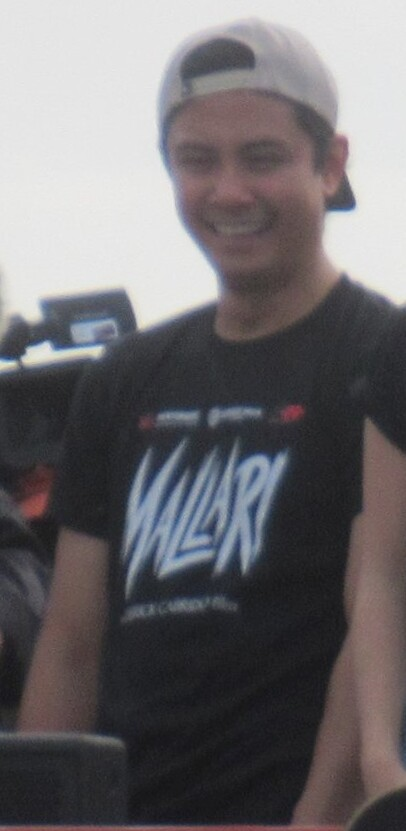
- Santos in 2023
- Born: John Carlo Abrugar Santos; November 19, 1988 (age 37); Angeles City, Philippines
- Occupation: Actor
- Years active: 2007–present
- Agents: GMA Artist Center (2013–2014) Viva Artists Agency (2014–present); Star Magic (2015–present)
- Height: 5 ft 8 in (173 cm)
- Spouse: Shyleena Herrera (m. 2019)
- Children: 1

John Carlo Abrugar Santos (born November 19, 1988) is a Filipino actor, best known for his role in the television series Till I Met You as Alejandro "Ali" Nicolas. He is also well known for his roles in the television series such as FPJ's Ang Probinsyano (2018), Walang Hanggang Paalam (2020–2021) and Dirty Linen (2023).

== Early life ==
Santos was born on November 19, 1988, in Pampanga, Philippines. He is one of the two children of Edwin Santos, a seaman, and Elizabeth Gutierrez, an OFW, and has a younger sister named Janine.

== Acting career ==
Santos studied Theater Arts at the University of the Philippines Diliman where he began his acting career appearing in plays by Dulaang UP. Few years later, before finishing his thesis at UP, he got accepted to work at Hong Kong Disneyland and at Universal Studios Singapore as a singer and dancer. He then flew to New York City to study musical theater at the Circle in the Square Theatre School. In the middle of his first year, he decided to come back home to the Philippines to pursue a career in acting.

== Personal life ==
Santos married Shyleena Herrera in 2019; they have one child.

== Theater ==
Year	Title	Role	Notes
2007	Passion of the Christ	Apostle James	Dulaang UP
2007	As You Like It / Paano Man Ang Ibig	Silvius	Dulaang UP
2007	The Silent Soprano	Stanley	Dulaang UP
2008	Orosman at Zafira	Zelim	Dulaang UP
2008	Hinabing Pakpak ng Ating Mga Anak	Aktor II	Dulaang UP
2008	Isang Panaginip na Fili	Basilio	Dulaang UP
2008	Atang	Amado V. Hernandez / Artemio Ricarte	Dulaang UP
2009	Lulu	Alva	Dulaang UP
2013	Adarna	Don Juan	Dulaang UP
2015	Bilanggo ng Pag-ibig	Abdallah	Dulaang UP
2015	Kung Paano Ako Naging Leading Lady	Jeryc Sans Rival	Dalanghita Productions
2015	Games People Play	Julio	Bit by Bit Company
2016	Constellations	Roland	Red Turnip Theater
2017	Buwan at Baril sa E♭ Major	Pari	Sugid Productions
2019	Lam-Ang	Lam-Ang	Cultural Center of the Philippines

== Filmography ==
=== Film ===
Key
†	Denotes films that have not yet been released

Year	Title	Role	Notes
2008	Jay	Larry	4th Cinemalaya Independent Film Festival
2014	The Janitor	Kito Ponce	10th Cinemalaya Independent Film Festival
2014	Esprit de Corps	Mac	2014 Cinema One Originals Film Festival
2014	Diary ng Panget	Assistant	Extra
2015	Imbisibol		
2015	Sakaling Hindi Makarating	Manuel	CineFilipino Film Festival
2016	Hinabing Pakpak ng Ating mga Anak	Gabriel	
2017	Nabubulok	Rommel	Cinemalaya 2017
2017	100 Tula Para Kay Stella	Fidel Lansangan	1st Pista ng Pelikulang Pilipino
2017	Meant to Beh	Christian Balatbat	43rd Metro Manila Film Festival
2018	Mr. & Mrs. Cruz	Raffy Cruz	
2018	The Day After Valentine's	Kai	2nd Pista ng Pelikulang Pilipino
2019	Open	Ethan	Black Sheep Productions and T-Rex Entertainment
2019	Tayo Muna Habang Hindi Pa Tayo	Carlo	2019 Cinema One Originals Film Festival
2019	Miracle in Cell No. 7	Mambo	Philippine remake
2019	Sunod	Lance	45th Metro Manila Film Festival Best Supporting Actor Nominee
2020	Motel Acacia	JC	Black Sheep Productions, Epic Media, Globe Studios
2020	On Vodka, Beers, and Regrets	Francis	
2020	Alter Me		Netflix
2021	Dito at Doon	Carlo "Cabs" Cabahug	
2021	More than Blue	K	
2022	366	Pao	
2023	Wish You Were The One	Ellis	
2023	Mallari	Bro. Lucas Segundo	49th Metro Manila Film Festival Best Supporting Actor Winner
2025	Candè	Timothy	ERK Film Production
2025	I Remember You	Gani	
2025	Meg & Ryan	Ryan Cañete	
2025	100 Awit Para Kay Stella	Fidel Lansangan	
2025	Quezon	Manuel Roxas	
2025	The Last Beergin	RG	
2025	Sana Sinabi Mo †		

=== Television/Digital ===
Year	Title	Role	Notes
2013	Mundo Mo'y Akin	JC	First TV appearance
2014	Magpakailanman	Ronnel	Episode: "My Love Forever"
2015	FlordeLiza	Jason	
2015	ASAP	Himself / Performer	
2015	Ipaglaban Mo!	Edmund	Episode: "Ilalaban ang Dangal"
2016	Karelasyon	Patel	Episode: "Wanted: Tatay"
2016	Single/Single	Steve	
2016	Forever Sucks	TL Tony	Digital Web Series
2016	Tubig at Langis	Noah	
2016	Ipaglaban Mo!	Gino	Episode: "Bintang"
2016	FPJ's Ang Probinsyano	young Don Emilio Syquia	
2016–2017	Till I Met You	Alejandro "Ali" Nicolas	with James Reid and Nadine Lustre
2017	I Can Do That	Himself	Contestant
2017	Wansapanataym: Annika Pintasera	Jerome Reyes	
2017	Ipaglaban Mo!	Karlo De Guzman	Episode: "Testigo"
2017	Ikaw Lang ang Iibigin	Percy Manicad	
2017	Eat Bulaga!	Himself	
2018	FPJ's Ang Probinsyano	Marco Cabrera	
2018	Maalaala Mo Kaya	Gio	Episode: "Fireworks"
2019	Project Feb 14	Corinto Diego "Cody" Liwanag	
2019	Call Me Tita	Karl Montalban	
2020	24/7	Angelo "Jelo" Sumilang	
2020–2021	Walang Hanggang Paalam	Carlos "Caloy" Rivera	
2022	Niña Niño	Alex	
2022	Beach Bros	Paulo	
2023	Dirty Linen	Police Lt. Lemuel Onore	
