= Viveika Ravanes =

Filipino entertainer (born 1975)

- Born: Donnabel Cuya Ravanes; July 15, 1975 (age 51); Pasig, Philippines
- Other name: Vivieka Vivieka
- Occupations: Actress, singer, comedian
- Years active: 2001–present
- Agent(s): Star Magic (2012–present); Brightlight Productions (2020–2021)

Donnabel Cuya Ravanes (born July 15, 1975), better known as Viveika Ravanes, is a Filipino actress, singer and comedian. Currently, she is a talent of ABS-CBN and is known for playing the role of Sabel in the hit daytime show Be Careful with My Heart.

Following her breakthrough, she secured recurring and guest roles in major Philippine TV series, including Dream Dad (2014–2015), Pangako Sa'Yo (2015), FPJ's Ang Probinsyano (2018), The Killer Bride (2019), and Mars Ravelo's Darna (2022–2023). She has also appeared in various episodes of the drama anthology Maalaala Mo Kaya.

== Early life and background ==
Ravanes was born July 15, 1975, in Pasig City, Philippines, heavily influenced her signature mass appeal and grounded sense of humor. These roots helped her connect deeply with working-class audiences during her early years performing in local stand-up comedy bars.

== Career ==
In 2026, action-drama series Blood vs Duty as she was adding her signature to the series, she recently joined the cast "A Cake to Remember" , the highly popular romantic drama series streaming exclusively on iWant, working alongside with Francine Diaz and Seth Fedelin in the "FranSeth" love team.

== Filmography ==
=== Film ===
Year	Title	Role
2025	Besprens in Tandem	Doctor Mahinay
2025	I'm Perfect	Yaya

=== Television ===
Year	Title	Role
2012–2014	Be Careful with My Heart	Isabel "Sabel" Fortuna-Lumaque
2014	Maalaala Mo Kaya: Mikropono	Osang
2014–2015	Dream Dad	Corina "Coring" Isidro
2015	Pangako Sa'Yo	Alta
2015	Luv U	Amor Pawis
2016	Maalaala Mo Kaya: Kamay	Rita
2016	We Will Survive	Apple
2016	Langit Lupa	Diday
2016	Ipaglaban Mo: Bugaw	Tessie
2017	Maalaala Mo Kaya: Ice Candy	Eva
2017	Hanggang Saan	Cora
2018	FPJ's Ang Probinsyano	Kapitana Dindi
2018–2019	Wansapanataym: Switch Be With You	Ofe's mother
2019	Bukas May Kahapon	Helena
2019	The Killer Bride	Ornusa
2020	Ipaglaban Mo: Budol	Madam Rodora
2020	Oh My Dad!	Cassie
2021	Maalaala Mo Kaya: Sobre	Chona
2022–2023	Mars Ravelo's Darna	Maritess
2023	Wish Ko Lang: Marites	Mary Ann
2025	Mommy Dearest	Kutsy Bernales
2025	Maalaala Mo Kaya: SIM Card	
2025	Sins of the Father	Len Mendoza
2026	Blood vs Duty	Zubina

=== Micodrama ===
Year	Title	Role
2026	A Cake to Remember	
