= Gem Ramos =

Filipino actress, dancer and singer

- Born: November 27, 1978
- Years active: 1992–present

Gem Ramos is a Filipino actress, dancer and singer.

== Personal life ==
Ramos is the sister of former South Border vocalist Duncan Ramos.

== Filmography ==
=== Television ===
Year	Title	Role	Notes	Source
1998	GMA Telesine Specials	Episode:"Happily Ever After"		
1998	GMA Telesine Specials	Episode:"Anito sa Usok"	Erlyn	
1998	GMA Telesine Specials	Episode:"Multo"		
2000	Pangako Sa 'Yo	Lia's Friend		
2000-01	Keep on Dancing	Herself — Host		
2002	Basta't Kasama Kita	Alan's wif2		
2003	Maalaala Mo Kaya		Episode: "Lapis"	
2003	Maalaala Mo Kaya		Episode: "Cassette Tape"	
2006	Maalaala Mo Kaya	Nurse Sheryl	Episode: "Rosas"	
2007	Maalaala Mo Kaya	Cecil	Episode: "Traffic Light"	
2009	Precious Hearts Romances Presents: Ang Lalaking Nagmahal Sa Akin	Jose Magpantay's girlfriend		
2009	May Bukas Pa	Salve Bustamante	Uncredited	
2009	Maalaala Mo Kaya	Ems	Episode: "Pendant"	
20	Maalaala Mo Kaya	Jenna's colleague	Episode: "Litrato"	
2010-11	Imortal	Taong Lobo		
2014	Maalaala Mo Kaya	Waitress	Episode: "Seaweeds"	
2011-12	Reputasyon	Lily		
2012	Maria la del Barrio	Hope		
2014	Maalaala Mo Kaya	Didith	Episode: "Marriage Contract"	
2015	Maalaala Mo Kaya	Social Worker	Episode: "Gown"	
2015	Ipaglaban Mo!	Sarah	Episode: "Lalaban ang Api"	
2016	Maalaala Mo Kaya	Yolly's sister	Episode: "Kahon"	
2016	Ipaglaban Mo!	Lena	Episode: "Witness"	
2016	Maalaala Mo Kaya	Roselle's sister	Episode: "Pantalan"	
2017	Maalaala Mo Kaya	Mina	Episode: "Kulungan"	

== Awards and nominations ==
Year	Work	Award	Category	Result	Source
2002	When Time Ends	15th Awit Awards	Best Dance Recording	Won	
