= Rufa Mi =

Filipina stand-up comedian, presenter, actress, and singer

- Born: Maria Krista Aguilar; April 8, 1988 (age 38)
- Education: Lyceum of the Philippines University
- Occupations: Comedian, presenter, actor, singer
- Years active: 2007–present
- Known for: Impersonating Rufa Mae Quinto

Maria Krista Aguilar (born April 8, 1988), known professionally as Rufa Mi, is a Filipina comedian, presenter, actress, and singer. Rufa Mi is known for impersonating actress Rufa Mae Quinto.

== Career ==
Rufa Mi began as a band singer, joining contests before entering Philippine show business. Rufa Mi auditioned for Pinoy Pop Superstar twice but failed, later entering an impersonation contest and dance audition for the EB Babes dance troupe in Eat Bulaga! but still did not win. One of the EB Babes judges, Andrew de Real, gave her a chance to perform at The Library, a known comedy bar. Since then, Joey de Leon gave her the stage name "Rufa Mi" because she bears a resemblance Rufa Mae Quinto.

Television commitments aside, Rufa Mi currently performs at The Library every Friday.

== Filmography ==
=== Television ===
Year	Title	Role
2007	Nuts Entertainment	Herself
2010–2011	House or Not	Host
2010–2011	P.O.5	Herself
2011	Star Confessions	Herself
2011	Mga Nagbabagang Bulaklak	Makahiya
2011	Wil Time Bigtime	Herself
2012	Sarah G. Live	Jinky
2012–2013	Ina, Kapatid, Anak	Aliya
2015	FPJ's Ang Probinsyano	Iñigo's nanny
2015	Ipaglaban Mo!	Herself

=== Film ===
Year	Title	Role
2009	Ang Darling Kong Aswang	Applicant
