= CX Navarro =

Filipino actor

- Born: Cel-Xievionze Navarro; June 23, 2006 (age 19); Philippines
- Occupations: Actor, commercial model
- Years active: 2013–present
- Agent: Star Magic (2013–present)
- Known for: Goin' Bulilit

Cel-Xievionze Navarro (born June 23, 2006), better known as CX Navarro, is a Filipino former child actor.

== Filmography ==
=== Television ===
Year	Title	Role
2022	Maalaala Mo Kaya: Bisikleta	Young James
2022	2 Good 2 Be True	Young Red
2019	Maalaala Mo Kaya: Kadena	Preteen Kirby
2019	Sino ang May Sala?: Mea Culpa	Rafa Catapang
2019	Maalaala Mo Kaya: Steak	Young Bong
2018	Precious Hearts Romances Presents: Araw Gabi	Young Red
2017	Maalaala Mo Kaya: Rehab Center	Young Jeck
2016	Maalaala Mo Kaya: Popcorn	Young Justine
2016	Dolce Amore	Motmot
2016	We Will Survive	Young Arnold Bonanza
2015	Wansapanataym: Raprap's Wrapper	Raprap
2015	Ipaglaban Mo: Hanggang Sa Huli	Allan
2014-2015	Two Wives	Marcus Guevarra
2014	Hawak Kamay	Young Brian Agustin
2014	Mars Ravelo's Dyesebel	Boying
2014	Maalaala Mo Kaya: Tutong	Mike
2014	Maalaala Mo Kaya: Bahay	Elijah
2014	Home Sweetie Home	young Romeo Valentino
2013	Junior Minute to Win It	Himself/Blue Team Member
2013	Wansapanataym: The Christmas Visitor	Jess
2013	It's Showtime	Himself/Guest Performer
2013–2019	Goin' Bulilit	Himself
