= Regine Angeles =

Filipino model and actress (born 1985)

- Born: Diorella Regine De Leon Angeles; October 29, 1985 (age 40); Quezon City, Philippines
- Occupations: Model; actress
- Years active: 2007–2021

Diorella Regine De Leon Angeles (born October 29, 1985) is a Filipino model and actress. She was the winner of Be Bench / The Model Search of ABS-CBN and then becoming one of ABS-CBN's Star Magic talents.

She is a member of the Christian organization, Iglesia ni Cristo.
