= Maalaala Mo Kaya season 25 =

Maalaala Mo Kaya
- Season 25
- Starring: Charo Santos
- No. of episodes: 50

Release
- Original network: ABS-CBN
- Original release: January 7 – December 23, 2017

Season chronology
- ← Previous; Season 24 Next → Season 26

Maalaala Mo Kaya (transl. Would you remember?; abbreviated MMK), also known as Memories in English, is a Filipino television series, which was first aired on May 15, 1991. MMK is the longest-running drama anthology on Philippine television.

== Episodes ==
#	Episode title	Directed by	Written by	Original air date
1	"Makeup"	Dado C. Lumibao	Benson Logronio and Arah Jell G. Badayos	January 7, 2017
Blessed with beauty and brains and spoiled by her parents growing up, Lyka seems to have everything. However, Lyka still feels restricted in her actions, especially by her strict father. She finally experiences the freedom she has always wished for when she enters college. Influenced by her friends, she goes clubbing every night and enjoys hanging out with different rich guys who spoil her with extravagant things. She eventually begins to neglect her studies and learns to tell lies to her parents, and in the process loses their trust. One day, she meets Mike, a policeman, who makes her realize the meaning of life and love. Will Mike efforts be enough to make a change in Lyka's life? Will she be able to regain her parents' trust? Cast: Jessy Mendiola, Carlo Aquino, James Blanco, Christian Vasquez, Kim Molina, Shy Carlos, Myrtle Sarrosa, Ronalisa Cheng, Michelle Ortega, Minco Fabregas, Simon Ibarra, Menggie Cobarrubias, RJ Ledesma
2	"Autograph"	Mae Rose Balanay and Arah Jell Badayos	Benson Logronio and Arah Jell G. Badayos	January 14, 2017
It is not a secret to many that before being known as the "Queen Mother," Karla had surpassed a lot of struggles in life. Karla used to enjoy a wealthy life until her grandfather, the one who provided for their family, suddenly died. This then forced her family to move from a private subdivision to the city proper in Tacloban. Despite the hardships in life, Karla remained determined to reach her dream of becoming a big star one day. She joined singing contests despite the strong disapproval of her mother, who urged her to stop from competing to avoid criticism. Karla carried on with her singing until her efforts paid off when she luckily got discovered in a music hub in Quezon City. She was then invited to join "That's Entertainment," unexpectedly skyrocketed to fame, and while at the top her career, got pregnant with her first child. How did she deal with her pregnancy and her career being at risk? Cast: Angelica Panganiban, Sharmaine Suarez, Alexa Ilacad, Carlos Morales, Jhai'ho, Pinky Marquez, Bailey May, Harvey Bautista, Mitch Naco, Chunsa Jung, MC Calaquian, Roy Requejo, Cheska Billones, Karla Estrada
3	"Tahanan" "Home"	Frasco Mortiz	Akeem Jordan del Rosario and Arah Jell Badayos	January 21, 2017
Recho is a brave and hardworking soldier serving in the Philippine Army, and a benevolent father to his two children, Angelique and Lorenz. Even though it is hard for him to juggle his duties as a soldier and as the head of his family, he tries his best to be there for his children. His life suddenly changes, however, when his marriage falls apart and he becomes a single father to his young girl and boy. How will Recho balance his military life and domestic life? Can he handle being both a dad and a mom to his children? Cast: John Estrada, Jerome Ponce, Bugoy Cariño, Marco Masa, Erin Ocampo, Jane de Leon, Rochelle Barrameda, Ronnie Quizon, Manuel Chua, Alex Castro, Marilyn Villamayor, Jomari Angeles
4	"Rehab Center"	Nuel C. Naval	Joan Habana and Arah Jell Badayos	January 28, 2017
Jeck live simple and happily with his parents in Cebu City. But it will change when his parents decided to work in America for a better future. He grows up without the guidance and care of his parents. Jeck feels sad and lonely, to ease loneliness, Jeck decided to use of drugs and alcohol with the influenced by his cousin. He is stealing things from their house to sustain his addiction. His parents know about this and decided to bring him in California. But Jeck uses drug again and alcohol because his parents have no time for them. In and out of the jail because he steals, burglarizes houses and defrauds credit card for his drug maintenance. His addiction left him penniless and homeless. Her mother sends him to a rehabilitation center until he recovers completely. He completely recovers and volunteers at a treatment facility. Cast: Enchong Dee, Tonton Gutierrez, Precious Lara Quigaman, Michelle Vito, CX Navarro, Crispin Pineda, Andrei Garcia, Karla Pambid, Kiko Matos, Kokoy de Santos, Cessa Moncera, Raul Montesa, Joshua Colet
5	"Cellphone"	Raz de la Torre	Benjamin Benson Logronio and Arah Jell Badayos	February 4, 2017 (re-aired on May 21, 2022)
Sandra and Mart were childhood friends who only saw each other every summer. Time passed by and their friendship turned into romance despite their young age. Even after Sandra moved to Bulacan with her grandmother, the two remained in contact and in love. Things started to fade when Mart began neglecting his boyfriend duties to Sandra and even ignored her efforts to save their relationship. With high hopes for the future, Sandra decided to break up with him and left him a letter professing her love and her willingness to wait for him. Did they have a second chance at love? Did Mart realize that he still loved Sandra? Cast: Zaijian Jaranilla, Belle Mariano, Yayo Aguila, Ricardo Cepeda, Raquel Montessa, Jennifer Mendoza, Nathaniel Britt, Alexa Macanan, Kyle Echarri, Ashley Colet, Sofia Andres, Diego Loyzaga
6	"Red Watch"	Theodore Boborol	Mae Rose Balanay and Arah Jell Badayos	February 11, 2017
Since his high school days, Tim is a carefree bachelor who only thinks of himself, while Jung Won is a Korean student and social worker assigned in an international NGO in the Philippines. Tim's perspective in life changes when he meets Jung Won and falls in love with her. Even if Jung Won focuses on her studies and in helping poor communities, Tim remains persistent just to get her heart. His efforts eventually pays off when Jun Wong finally reciprocates his love. Their relationship is going smoothly until Jung Won decides to finish her studies in South Korea. Will this challenge mark the end of Jung Won and Tim's love story? Cast: Ejay Falcon, Isay Alvarez, Lito Pimentel, Lollie Mara, Tart Carlos, Kyline Alcantara, Kenzo Gutierrez, Mica Javier, Yohan Hwang, Kristine Hammond, Sunny Kim
7	"Bituin" "Star"	Theodore Boborol	Mae Rose Balanay and Arah Jell Badayos	February 18, 2017
John meets Aika just as when she is recovering from a broken heart. He pursues her, but Aika is reluctant to start a relationship with him for fear of getting hurt again. She suppresses her feelings, until she can no longer deny that she has completely fallen for John. She gives their love a chance and her fear of being left behind disappears. The two are very happy together but not for long, because Aika gets diagnosed with leukemia. How will John and Aika deal with her illness? Will they continue what they have started? Who will fight until the end and who will give up? Cast: Julia Barretto, Joshua Garcia, Allen Dizon, Lilet, Pamu Pamorada, Devon Seron, Anjo Damiles, Nikki Gonzales, Kyra Custodio, Raine Salamante, Mikee Agustin, Baninay Bautista
8	"Sto. Niño" "Holy Child"	Frasco Mortiz	Benjamin Benson Logronio and Arah Jell Badayos	February 25, 2017
Isong is a barangay officer who turned into an active tipster for their local government, and his family. Despite their impoverished life, they, including little boy Ninin, continues to have a positive outlook in life. For Isong, his loyalty to his job would be able to secure his family's future and safety. However, their world will change in just a snap and their peaceful life will be disrupted when Ninin dies after getting hit by a stray bullet. Isong is filled with grief because he wasn't able to save his son. To make matters worse, his very own wife Marilou blames him for their son's death. Cast: Jhong Hilario, Angel Aquino, Nikki Bagaporo, David Chua, Young JV, Jason Fernandez, Menggie Cobarrubias, Ces Aldaba, Nhikzy Calma, Winryll Banaag, Macky Billones, Alfonso Yñigo Delen
9	"Gatas" "Milk"	Dado C. Lumibao	Joan Habana and Arah Jell Badayos	March 4, 2017
Life hasn't been easy for Marie. She grew up with a dad who sells drugs for a living and a mom who maltreats her. One day, she elopes with her boyfriend in hopes of having a better life with him. Unfortunately, she is wrong and things only get worse especially after the man she loves sexually abuses her. With no one to lean on, Marie gets strength from her child and mom. To realize her dreams for her family, Marie agrees to bear a child with a married man in exchange of money. Will Marie really give up being a mother to an innocent child? Cast: Jodi Sta. Maria, Raymond Bagatsing, Ahron Villena, Maureen Mauricio, Rhed Bustamante, Bing Davao, Lara Morena
10	"Stroller Bag"	Raz de la Torre	Mae Barrientos Balanay and Arah Jell Badayos	March 11, 2017
Growing up in a poor family, Vin-zl strived hard to excel in her studies in order to give them a better life especially after her sister got pregnant. She promised herself that she would not end up the same fate as her sister's. However, her boyfriend Red unexpectedly got her pregnant that made her stop her studies. Nevertheless, her willingness to finish her studies didn't waver. Hence, after giving birth, her father and her husband supported her in continuing her studies. As she returns to school, how will she be able to balance being a student and being a mother to her daughter Vianca especially that she also needs to bring Vianca along with her to school? Cast: Erich Gonzales, Geoff Eigenmann, Andrea del Rosario, Michael Flores, Eda Nolan, Yana Asistio, Crystal Crooks
11	"Sulat" "Letter"	Dado C. Lumibao	Mae Rose Barrientos Balanay and Arah Jell G. Badayos	March 18, 2017
Bernard already knew that it was love the moment he laid his eyes on Cze. When they were young, Bernard secretly sent handmade love letters to Cze to express his admiration for her. The two eventually get acquainted with each other until Cze finds out that Bernard is her secret admirer. Bernard continues to pursue her, nonetheless, until they finally become a couple. Their relationship goes smoothly, until Bernard's father petitions him to go live with him in the U.S. At first, they try to continue their relationship, but their communication gets lost along the way. And in the long run, Cze gives up hopes of saving their relationship. Time passes by, and Cze meets Rico and gets pregnant with his child. Their parents then decide to get them married, but weeks before their wedding, Bernard returns to Cze's life. Will Cze still marry Rico? Is there still a chance for Cze and Bernard to be together again? Cast: Kim Chiu, Gerald Anderson, Edgar Allan Guzman, Eva Darren, Daisy Reyes, Jong Cuenco, Gigi Locsin Yogo Singh, Avery Balasbas, Kamille Filoteo, Myel de Leon, Milo Elmido Jr.
12	"Bahay" "House"	Raz de la Torre	Joan P. Habana and Arah Jell G. Badayos	March 25, 2017
Behind her happy disposition in life, Maymay grew up in an unideal family set-up. Her father left them when she was still very young while her mother decided to work in Japan to provide for her needs. She was practically raised by her grandparents who were the ones who filled the void in her heart. Maymay's world crumbled, however, when her beloved grandfather got hospitalized for his heart condition. This ordeal depleted the family's finances that even led to them selling their house just to sustain their everyday life. How did Maymay and her family coped in this very tough time? What prompted Maymay to join "PBB"? Cast: Vina Morales, Dante Rivero, Ces Quesada, Paul Salas, Gerald Madrid, Johan Santos, Marc Acueza, Bianca Bentulan, Lance Lucido, Kira Balinger, Raven Cajuguiran, Maymay Entrata
13	"Saklay" "Sling"	Efren Vibar	Benson A. Logronio and Arah Jell G. Badayos	April 1, 2017
Being the only child, Mon literally had it all. Everything he wanted was handed to him by his parents Lino and Mila, which was why he grew up arrogant and very dependent on them. But his luxurious life was gone in a snap when their family's business folded. As if adjusting his lifestyle wasn't enough torture already, Mon's situation got worse as both of his parents died--- one after the other. How did he rise from all these challenges? Cast: McCoy De Leon, Tetchie Agbayani, Louella de Cordova, Dang Cruz, Patrick Sugui, Lei Navarro, Christopher de Leon
14	"Kulungan" "Jail"	Dado C. Lumibao	Akeem Jordan del Rosario and Arah Jell G. Badayos	April 8, 2017
Ever since Maya went to jail in 2008 for drug charges, her daughter Joy has been a constant visitor in the jail facility where she's detained. This is how they get to spend time and bond with each other. Joy's regular visits, however, also pave the way for her to meet Rustom, a young inmate who captivates her heart and causes tension between her and her mother. Maya's anger grows when she learns that Joy chooses to be with Rustom when he transfers to Manila. Will the relationship of Maya and Joy be fixed? How will Maya help her daughter cope once she learns about her husband's infidelity after she gives birth? Cast: Lorna Tolentino, Alexa Ilacad, Edgar Allan Guzman, Alicia Alonzo, Gilleth Sandico, Minco Fabregas, Gem Ramos, Cessa Moncera, Kyle Banzon
15	"Tubuhan" "Sugar Cane Plantation"	Nuel C. Naval	Benson A. Logronio and Arah Jell G. Badayos	April 22, 2017
Having a family full of aspiring singers, young Noven grew fond of joining singing contests. His father Rey had been his number one supporter, being a singer himself. He believed Noven is the one who will alleviate them from poverty. As time passed by, however, Noven's interest in music changed, which caused misunderstandings between him and his father. Their gap grew even more when Noven questioned Rey's role as a father. But life didn't get any better for Noven. He even stopped his studies due to financial problems, and became a farmer in the same sugar cane plantation where his father works. How will Noven's relationship with his father fixed? What will inspire Noven to sing again? Will he get the support of his father when he joins "Tawag ng Tanghalan?" Cast: Khalil Ramos, Nyoy Volante, Meryll Soriano, Noel Comia Jr., Tess Antonio, Jane de Leon
16	"Family Tree"	Dado C. Lumibao	Mae Rose B. Balanay and Arah Jell G. Badayos	April 29, 2017
Ever since, Clara has been longing to feel the love and care of a father. That is why she becomes close with good friend Jun (Nonie Buencamino), who happens to be a married man. Knowing that her feelings for him may fall her into sin, Clara decides to stay away and explore opportunities abroad. As she returns, Clara reconnects with Jun. The two, however, can no longer stop themselves and finally give in to what they are feeling for each other. One night changes everything as Clara gets pregnant. Instead of staying away though, she opts to become the second wife so as to give her child a complete family. Until when will Clara tolerate being a mistress? What ordeal will change their lives forever? Cast: Carmina Villarroel, Nonie Buencamino, Patricia Javier, Ruby Ruiz, Barbie Imperial, Lui Villaruz, Yogo Singh, Joshua Dionisio, Simon Ibarra, Johan Santos, CX Navarro, Alfonso Yñigo Delen, Jai Agpangan, Melizza Jimenez
17	"Kendi" "Candy"	Mae Cruz-Alviar	Joan Habana and Arah Jell G. Badayos	May 6, 2017
What Nanay Estrelita thought was just a simple "nervous breakdown" turned out to be schizophrenia, a mental disorder. With the help of the National Center for Mental Health, she was able to cure herself and stopped taking medications as soon as the symptoms were gone. Little did she knew that her sickness would recur, to the point that she physically abused her daughter, Princess. This prompted her husband Aurelio to take Princess with him and leave Estrelita on her own. How will Nanay Estrelita overcome this ordeal? How did she reunited with Princess? What will be the significance of Facebook in rebuilding her relationship with her daughter? Cast: Rosanna Roces, Jana Agoncillo, Ronnie Lazaro, Sharlene San Pedro, Mikee Agustin, Marife Necesito
18	"Salon"	Dado C. Lumibao	Joan Habana and Arah Jell G. Badayos	May 13, 2017
Pia is a loving and caring child to her parents. Even though they strongly disapprove of her gender identity, Pia remains respectful of them. In the middle of her search to gain her parents' acceptance came a little angel in the form of Lester, a Filipino-German child left by his prostitute mother. For a person who was not fond of children, Pia saw Lester as an added burden to her many responsibilities. What will cause Pia's change of heart? Will Lester be the key to Pia's reconciliation with her parents? Will her gender identity matter to prove her worth as a mother? Cast: Hero Angeles, Cherry Pie Picache, Louise Abuel, Emilio Garcia, Bugoy Cariño, Miho Nishida, Roxanne Barcelo, Lollie Mara, Marnie Lapus, Kamille Filoteo, Jef Gaitan, Marithez Samson
19	"Picture"	Nuel C. Naval	Benson A. Logronio and Arah Jell G. Badayos	May 20, 2017
The first part tells the story from the vantage point of Idai, a mother whose child disappeared and was allegedly abducted by an unknown woman. Ever since her parents separated, Idai wanted nothing but to have a happy and complete family. Despite the hardships in life, she and her husband Alfredo strived hard to give their children what they needed and showered them with overflowing love and affection. One day, however, Idai's youngest child Topher went missing and was believed to have been abducted. Idai tried desperately to look for her son but to no avail. Little did they know that Topher was with a woman named Roma, who took the child with her to her hometown in Lanao. How did Idai reunite with her son Topher? Why did Roma take the child? What's her version of the story? Cast: Dimples Romana, Dominic Ochoa, Jane Oineza, Alfonso Yñigo Delen, Mara Lopez, Tanya Gomez, Jennifer Mendoza, Negi Molina, Lance Lucido, Angel Locsin
20	"Kotse-Koteshan" "Cars"	Dado C. Lumibao	Benjamin Benson P. Logronio and Arah Jell G. Badayos	May 27, 2017
After viewers witnessed Idai's vantage point of how she lost her child, it is now Samina's turn to tell her side of the story about why she took Idai's little boy with her to Lanao in the second half of the special two-part episode of "MMK." Life had no direction for Samina or Roma Tarub before Topher came to her life. Her sister Aisah knew this very well since she would always be the one to cover for her or take responsibilities for her actions. Despite all these, Aisah loved her sister dearly. As they grew up, they separated ways and started families of their own. Samina bravely faced the streets of Divisoria as a street vendor, while Aisah stayed in Lanao and had five children with her husband, the mayor's driver. A few years later, the two accidentally met in the most complicated situation. Aisah was with the driver of the mayor while Samina was waiting for Idai, the mother of Topher or Brombrom whom Samina adopted after seeing him wandering around in Divisoria. What happened in this unexpected reunion? Would Aisah get involved again in the topsy-turvy life of Samina? Did Samina really kidnap Topher? Cast: Jane Oineza, Dimples Romana, Alfonso Yñigo Delen, Alex Medina, Mara Lopez, Nikka Valencia, Karen Timbol, Raine Salamante, Yesha Camile, Marc Acueza, Alora Sasam, JM Gacayan, Miguel Vergara, Veyda Inoval, Marilyn Villamayor, Angel Locsin; Note: this episode won the award for Angel Locsin's performance
21	"Korona" "Crown"	Nuel C. Naval	Joan P. Habana and Arah Jell G. Badayos	June 3, 2017
After being abandoned by their father, Pia carried the responsibility of being the breadwinner of the family as the eldest among the siblings. She fearlessly entered the world of show business, where she started to accept modeling and acting stints. However, in the midst of her journey, her fighting spirit began to crumble as her acting career was not taking flight, while her fellow artists had already gone their way to stardom. But because of her family, she swallowed her pride and continued to accept minor roles. Just as when she started to get her groove back, her mother and stepfather decided to migrate to U.K. With a heavy heart, she supported their decision and tried to start a new life there. For years, she worked in a factory until she realized that that was not the life she wanted for herself. Hoping to have a better life, she went back to Philippines and gave show business another shot. What happened in her second try in show business? How did she come across the world of beauty pageants? What other challenges did she face in order to succeed in her dream? Cast: Liza Soberano, Zsa Zsa Padilla, Krystal Mejes, Lilygem Yulores, Fifth Solomon, Roeder Camanag, Lee O'Brien, Erin Ocampo, Michelle Vito, Mari Kaimo, Ahwel Paz, Heaven Peralejo, Hanna Ledesma
22	"Laptop"	Raz Dela Torre	Jaymar Santos Castro	June 10, 2017
Rose is overweight and dark skinned, not the ideal image of a beautiful girl. Although she comes to make many friends, she still could not get over her insecurities. She experiences heartbreaks because of her appearance. Until one day she and her friend create a fake Facebook account using her beautiful cousin's picture. Through this account Rose experiences the life of a beautiful girl, all admiration and compliments. Cast: Elisse Joson, Mccoy de Leon, Ara Mina, Vin Abrenica, Igi Boy Flores, Patrick Sugui, Chienna Filomeno, Ysabel Ortega, Axel Torres, Alvin Anson, DJ Chacha
23	"Upuan" "Chair"	Dado C. Lumibao	Akeem Jordan D. del Rosario and Arah Jell G. Badayos	June 17, 2017
Many were moved by his selfless act but not many people know about the struggles tatay Ryan had to go through in life. A hardworking and loving father who wants nothing but to give his family a good life, Ryan had his dreams shattered when he suffered a stroke that paralyzed half of his body and also affected his speech. Instead of being the breadwinner of the family, he became more of a burden to them, especially to his wife Rosalyn (Isabelle Daza). At first, Rosalyn took care of him and understood his situation. However, she eventually got fed up and left him for another man. How did Ryan help himself and at the same time raise his two children? Cast: Piolo Pascual, Isabelle Daza, Lito Pimentel, Xia Vigor, Myel de Leon, Ynna Asistio, Maika Rivera, Encar Benedicto, Micah Muñoz
24	"Traysikel" "Tricycle"	Garry Fernando	Benson Logronio	June 24, 2017
Tatay George was not born with a disability. In fact, he grew up as a strong and healthy kid. However in an early age, he was forced to work to prove himself to his father that caused his legs to be paralyzed. Amidst his condition, he remained to be a diligent student and pursued his studies. His drive to earn a diploma, however, was shattered when his very own father forced him to stop. George felt so bad that he left home and wandered the streets alone. How did he face life on his own? What inspired him to continue fighting in life? What prompted him to make his custom-made tricycle? Cast: Ketchup Eusebio, Marco Masa, Allan Paule, Empress Schuck, Alicia Alonzo, Crispin Pineda, Maricel Morales, Kazumi Porquez, Justin James Quilantang, Sammie Rimando
25	"Sketch Pad"	Nuel C. Naval	Jaymar Castro and Arah Jell Badayos	July 1, 2017
Behind the famous designs of Rocky is a kid who longs for a complete family. A week after he was born, his mother left him with his alcoholic and womanizer father. As time passed, Rocky realized that he was gay and was more in touch with his feminine side. Because of this, he decided to leave his father behind to look for his mother. However, their reunion wasn't exactly how he pictured it to be. His mother, unfortunately, chose her new family over him and didn't even welcome him with open arms. Rocky was then left wandering the streets of Roxas Boulevard all by himself. How did he survive this ordeal? What paved the way for Rocky to enter the world of fashion and become one of the Philippines' pride today? Cast: Arjo Atayde, Zaijian Jaranilla, Nonie Buencamino, Fanny Serrano, Pooh, Shy Carlos, Jenny Miller
26	"Mesa" "Table"	Raz de la Torre	Benson Logronio and Arah Jell Badayos	July 8, 2017
Growing up in a simple, yet happy family where eating together is the highlight, Marie Julieta (11), third of the six siblings, sees how her family's life turned upside down when their father, Manuel hit a severe sickness. Marie and her older siblings have to sacrifice for the sake of the family - Lan (18), being the acting eldest, takes half of the responsibility of the family. He takes care of his father, younger siblings, and works as a helper to sustain for his family. Angie (12), next to Lan has to move to Dolores and stay with her Auntie Demie, so she can still study. Marie then takes the responsibility of being an "ate" for her younger siblings when Lan and her mom are not around. This leads her to become insecure with other children who are free to play outside and do what normal children do. As they transfer from one place to another for their father's cure, they experience judgment and prejudice from the people they thought would love them as a family. Leaving their younger siblings Nino, Nina, and Baby to Demie, Rosa cries everyday as she longs for her children because she, Lan, Marie, and Manuel have to stay in Iligan to find cure for their father. As the six of them experience pain, it also leads them to maturity where they work hard individually and promise to pursue their dreams and help each other as one. After Manuel's death, all the siblings are put to test as they decide to move to Iligan (where their two eldest siblings live) to continue their journey individually, and as a family. Shortly, Lan (21) has to move to Cagayan to work as a helper for their relatives and study for a year, while Angie (15) stays with their relatives near Iligan while managing her lola's shop. Marie (14), on the other hand, studies well while taking care of her siblings. Rosa, though getting old, would always prepare "baon" for Nino, Nina, and Baby - younger siblings. After a year of staying in Cagayan, Lan decides to come back to Iligan and takes another course which is mechanical engineering. Along their journey as siblings, Angie, Lan, and Marie don't realize that slowly, one of their younger siblings, Nina, is becoming distant to them. After how many months of hiding, they find out that Nina (16) is pregnant. Because of this, the siblings decide to help Nina emotionally and financially. This situation leads them to give more love and care for each other, living up to their father's legacy. As time goes by, Marie learns to stand on her own, so she decides to go to Dubai, which Lan dismisses. For the first time, Marie says no to her brother and still pursues Dubai. After a year, Marie comes back because things don't go right for her in Dubai. She realizes her mistakes as she talks to her brother regarding what happened. Of all their pain and challenges in life, the siblings never give up on each other until they all succeed in life-with Marie and Nina who are now registered nurses, Lan and Baby who are now engineers, Angie a computer analyst, and Nino a seaman. Despite all the struggles they face, they still tend to endure, persevere, and do what they do as a family-eat and be together. Cast: Amy Austria, Michael de Mesa, Jana Agoncillo, Louise Abuel, Angeline Quinto, Rayver Cruz, Faye Alhambra, Raine Salamante, Raquel Monteza, Bing Davao, Jacob Dionisio, Andre Garcia, Dexie Daulat, Jamilla Obispo, Kamille Filoteo, Gigi Locsin, Rolly Inocencio
27	"Ice Candy"	Jerome Chavez Pobocan	Akeem Jordan D. del Rosario and Arah Jell Badayos	July 15, 2017 (re-aired on August 13, 2022)
Melanie was still very young when she met an accident that caused her hunched back. Growing up, she was teased and judged by many, but despite this, Melanie remained strong and focused on her dream of finishing her studies. But life was really hard for her and her mother, who could barely send her to school. Thus, she stopped studying and went to Cavite to look for a job. Just as when she thought that she could start a new life in the city, her co-worker raped her, leaving her shattered. How did she handle this ordeal? How did she move on from it when she carried the baby of a man who sexually assaulted her? Cast: Bela Padilla, Ashley Sarmiento, Mickey Ferriols, Mutya Orquia, Jordan Herrera, Miel Espinoza, Niña Dolino, Boom Labrusca, Viveika Ravanes, Olive Cruz, Mitch Naco
28	"Damit" "Clothes"	Dado C. Lumibao	Mae Rose Balanay and Arah Jell Badayos	July 22, 2017 (re-aired on August 27, 2022)
Hershey Hilado (5) grows up in an environment of physical and emotional abuse caused by her own mother, Emy (26). Hershey's father, Jimmy (26) left Iloilo, along with her younger brother Malick (3), when he found out about Emy's affair with a Chinese national in Hong Kong. Then, Hershey is left behind in Iloilo with her grandfather Dongdong (71) and her older half-sister Emylen (8). Whenever Emy comes home from Hong Kong, Hershey (12), along with Emylen (15), expect beating from their mother, while they never understand why their mother does so. Due to this, the siblings often run away from their home only to be found again by Dongdong who is known in their town as a former second lieutenant. One day, Hershey receives news from their neighbor that her father Jimmy (34) had been murdered in Batangas. Two years later, Dongdong (82) suffers from various health complications, but with his dying breath, Dongdong makes Hershey promise to take care of all of her siblings and make sure that they will live a good life. Almost parentless, Hershey (14) is forced to shoplift in order to fulfill her grandfather's instructions, and feed all of her siblings. This pains Hershey, but instead of dwelling in the pain, Hershey thinks of ways to escape the hardships she encounters, especially, her mother's unreasonable wrath. At 16 years old, after being forced to marry a foreigner almost thrice her age, Hershey manages to escape from her mother and flies to Manila, with the help of Dongdong's friend, Raul (late 70s). With only P1,000 in her pocket, Hershey is faced with another ordeal as she becomes homeless for almost two years until she finds her relatives from her father's side in Lipa, Batangas. Dolores (late 40s) and Belen (early 30s) take Hershey in until she finds herself in an online dating site where she meets Scott (30s), an Australian national whom she truly falls in love with. Two years later, Hershey (18) is brought to Australia and marries Scott. Still with her promise to Dongdong, Hershey starts to work her way upwards and applies as a crew member in McDonald's. Two years later, she quits her job and applies for a security company and trains there for six months. From being a store-front guard, Hershey gets promoted as a Security Control Room Operator. While at work, she reads a book called "Rich Dad, Poor Dad" by Robert Kiyosaki, which inspires her to do more than just being good at her job, knowing that her purpose is greater than just surviving - it is keeping her promise to her late father figure Dongdong. A few months later, Hershey (21) quits her job in the security office and starts her first business. Through this business, Hershey is able to send money to her younger siblings in Iloilo, under her brother Chris' (16) management. Currently, through the help of her business, an Australia-based women's fashion label called "Ohmagosh," Hershey (24) fulfills her promise to her grandfather to always make sure that her siblings live a good life. Cast: Ria Atayde, Aleck Bovick, Alyanna Angeles, Celine Lim, Yesha Camile, Rhed Bustamante, Richard Reynoso, Ernie Garcia, Denise Joaquin, Simon Ibarra, Ryle Santiago, Ivan Padilla, Maritess Samson
29	"Mansanas at Juice"	Dado C. Lumibao	Joan Habana	July 29, 2017
Early on, Roy (Yves Flores) was made to believe that life is a never-ending cycle of starvation and menial farming jobs alongside his parents and six siblings. But in his young mind, he knew there was more to life and that he could be better. Given his family's scarce resources, Roy saw education as his only hope to lift himself and his family from poverty. That is why he devoted his life to studying. Little did he know that his parents would be the ones to hinder him from achieving his dreams. Instead of seeing education as an opportunity for him to change his life, Roy's parents considered it more as a threat to the little money they already have. How did he manage to continue his ambitions of becoming a teacher? Cast: John Estrada, Yves Flores, Mylene Dizon, Marco Masa, Nanding Josef, Isabel Granada, Lollie Mara, Shirley Fuentes, Marlo Mortel, Johan Santos, Yñigo Delen, Brace Arquiza, Veyda Inoval, Nikki Gonzales, Riva Quenery
30	"Tape Recorder"	Mae Cruz Alviar	Mark Angos	August 5, 2017
Paired as a 'love team' in school, Allan (Iñigo) and Lou Ann (Maris) got teased a lot by their friends and classmates. This paved the way for their feelings for each other to grow and for their relationship to level up from being friends to finally becoming lovers. The two were inseparable even when they stepped into college. They had their share of ups and downs but managed to find their way back into love. Until one day, Allan needed to leave the country to work in Dubai. Did the Allan and Lou Ann 'loveteam' survive this challenge? Cast: Maris Racal, Iñigo Pascual, Jairus Aquino, Nikki Bagaporo, Amy Nobleza, Kokoy de Santos, Heaven Peralejo, Vivoree Esclito, Arlene Muhlach, Rochelle Barrameda, Bea Basa, Noel Comia Jr., Andre Yllana
31	"Salamin"	Raz dela Torre	Shugo Praico	August 12, 2017
Christian gives life to the story of Ben, son of actress Helen Vela (Gloria Diaz) and the sibling of Princess Punzalan (Ritz Azul). Growing up in the public eye, Ben was a target for bullying and received many hurtful comments from people concerning his physical features and especially because he was an illegitimate child. This paved way for him to grow insecurities but despite this, his family always supported him. When his mother died, his life suddenly fell apart. He was so devastated that he turned his back on his siblings. In his resistance, he decided to live alone and this led him to work in a gay bar as a macho dancer. What happened to Ben in his journey to find himself? Did Ben and his siblings reconcile? Cast: Ritz Azul, JB Agustin, Ingrid dela Paz, Angelo Ilagan, Mari Kaimo, Toby Alejar, Alex Castro, Kyline Alcantara, Mica Javier, Nathaniel Britt, Gloria Diaz, Christian Bables
32	"Piyesa"	Raz dela Torre	Joan Habana	August 19, 2017
Mica Barrero, who competed and became a finalist in the recently concluded “The Voice Teens,” was devastated when she learned about her father's extra-marital affair when she was a young girl. Since childhood, music was very close to Mica's (Amy Nobleza) heart. Her family even had her back and supported her all the way especially her father Ramil (Adrian Alandy). Unable to release her anger, she used music as a form of escape. However another huge mishap struck her family when her father Ramil suffered a stroke. How did Mica survive this new dilemma in her life? Did this incident pave way to the reconciliation of Mica and her dad? Cast: Amy Nobleza, Vina Morales, Adrian Alandy, Ynna Asistio, Eva Darren, Faye Alhambra, Dexie Diaz, Via Antonio
33	"Jumper"	Nuel Naval	Benson Logronio	August 26, 2017
Charice Pempengco, (later known as Jake Zyrus) wanted nothing but for people, especially his mother, to accept him for who he is. He was a young kid then when he first observed that he was more attracted to women than men. As he grew up, he also grew certain about his gender, yet he still chose to act and dress as a woman in public so as not to jeopardize his career. How did Jake manage to hide his true identity all these years? What pushed him to finally be true to himself and re-introduce himself as Jake Zyrus? Cast: Dina Bonnevie, Sharlene San Pedro, Mutya Orquia, Paul Salas, Troy Montero, Helga Krapf, Erin Ocampo, Mike Lloren, Karla Pambid, Andrei Garcia, Uno Bibo, Jake Zyrus
34	"Kwekkwek"	Mae Cruz-Alviar	Benson A. Logronio and Arah Jell G. Badayos	September 2, 2017
After Randy realizes his mother's sufferings, he leads to working as macho dancer to help his family. However, because of peer pressure, Randy resorts to using drugs as a form of escape from all the pain he is going through. In the middle of his struggles, he meets Mutya, a young woman whose insecurities pushed her to become dependent on drugs. The two become friends and frequent 'buddies,' eventually growing feelings for each other. What will prompt the two to re-assess their lives and change for the better? What obstacles will they face as a couple? Cast: Xian Lim, Shy Carlos, Nonie Buencamino, Shamaine Buencamino, Ynez Veneracion, Junjun Quintana, Lloyd Zaragoza, Michael Agassi, Bea Basa, Lance Lucido, Joseph Bitangcol, Marc Acueza, Tom Doromal, Hannah Ledesma
35	"Bandila" "Flag"	Dado C. Lumibao	Mary Rose B. Balanay and Arah Jell G. Badayos	September 9, 2017
As soon as the war broke out, Loloy immediately brought his wife Grace and son Brian to safety and went straight to his Muslim employers' house. They were about to leave the city when more than 30 teachers and school staff, who also sought refuge in the same residence, begged them to stay. Risking his family's chance at survival, Loloy together with Grace and Brian heeded their call and stayed with the group. For eleven days, Loloy did his best to take care of everyone. But things started to become hard for all of them when their food and water supplies depleted. A different challenge awaited them when they had to leave the house and run for their lives to reach the military safe zone. How did Loloy lead everyone to safety? What did he do when his son suddenly wanted to give up the fight? Cast: John Estrada, Zaijian Jaranilla, Precious Lara Quigaman, Gilleth Sandico, Micah Muñoz, Lester Llansang, Claire Ruiz, Mara Lopez, Jai Agpangan, Jomari Angeles, Milo Elmido Jr., Martha Comia, Hazel Faith Dela Cruz, Jacqui Leus, Carla Martinez, Zeppi Borromeo, Roy Requejo, Lowell Conales, Victor Medina
36	"Tungkod" "Cane"	Nuel C. Naval	Akeem Jordan D. Del Rosario and Arah Jell G. Badayos	September 16, 2017
In her community, Pacita is known for her bravery and dedication to her work and her loved ones. After being raped and left by the father of her son, Anton, she successfully juggled her roles as a teacher and a good mother to her son. Her son's welfare remained her priority until she retired, as she used her retirement pay to build a house and buy a tricycle for him. However, she seemed to have lost everything when her house got burned down by a fire, which prompted her to go back to school as a janitress. How did she overcome this trial in her life? Cast: Chanda Romero, Aljur Abrenica, Karel Marquez, Izzy Canillo, Jennifer Mendoza, Maricel Morales, Lilygem Yulores, Cessa Moncera, Mico Aytona, Jojo Abellana, Jess Evardone, JM Ibañez.
37	"Baso" "Glass"	Dado C. Lumibao	Jaymar S. Castro and Arah Jell G. Badayos	September 23, 2017 (re-aired on May 28, 2022)
Ever since she adopted the little boy from her niece, Guily has always treated Jayson as her own. It did not take long for Jayson to find out the truth about his identity after he noticed he was using a surname different from his parents'. After knowing that his biological mother was still alive, Jayson grew up longing to meet her. Being a child out of wedlock, Guily fully understood what he was going through, so one day, she accompanied him to his mother Chona. Jayson's much awaited moment, however, did not happen how he pictured it to be. What happened when Jayson finally came face-to-face with Chona? How did the encounter affect his life? Cast: JC de Vera, Dimples Romana, Lito Pimentel, Louise Abuel, Raikko Mateo, Madeleine Nicolas, Michael Roy Jornales, Lui Villaruz, Encar Benedicto, Menggie Cobarrubias, Jong Cuenco, Nikki Bagaporo, Wynril Banaag, Maricel Soriano
38	"Tulay" "Bridge"	Jeffrey Jeturian	Benjamin Benson A. Logronio and Arah Jell G. Badayos	September 30, 2017
Erna was still a toddler when she was unintentionally lost by her parents. Fortunately, a good Samaritan found her and brought her to Indong's family where she was welcomed as Juliet Perez. Indong was a loving father to her but her foster mother, Salving and her foster brothers didn't like her at all. She devoted her teenage years to earn their love and acceptance until one night, she dreamed of her biological family and this sparked her curiosity and desire to find them. Will she succeed in tracing her roots? How will her plan affect her relationship with her adoptive family? Cast: Jessy Mendiola, Carmi Martin, Heart Ramos, Aleck Bovick, Bobby Andrews, Neil Coleta, John Manalo, Carla Humphries, Johan Santos, Marc Acueza, Aiko Climaco, Karen Timbol, Olive Cruz, Carlo Lacana, Andre Garcia, Krystal Crooks, Christopher de Leon
39	"Diploma"	Raz de la Torre	Joan Habana	October 7, 2017
Even with the objection of Marlene's parents, she and Memerto (Ariel) managed to live a peaceful life with their three children. However things suddenly changed when Memerto got addicted to gambling. Little by little, he exhausted their savings until one day, he committed a crime, accidentally killing his opponent due to recklessness. He, then, turned himself in and faced the charges against him. Full of regrets, he tried his best to make up for his shortcomings by the businesses he built inside the prison. Marlene didn't let him down and did her part in staying faithful to him. She also helped him in his ties with their children. Cast: Ariel Rivera, Sunshine Cruz, Paul Salas, Mikylla Ramirez, Marlo Mortel, Jane de Leon, Yesha Camille, Hannah Vito, Yñigo Delen, Bing Davao, Gigi Locsin, Roeder Camanag, Minco Fabregas, Archi Adamos, Maritess Joaquin
40	"Singsing" "Ring"	Mae Cruz-Alviar	Mary Rose Colindres	October 14, 2017
To find herself again after a break-up, Mae (Erich) decided to join a hiking team. On her first hike, she met Pio (Patrick), one of the organizers and later on the man who will mend her broken heart. The two became an official couple and their relationship was going strong until Mae got pregnant. Mae was afraid at first, but Pio stayed by her side and even asked her hand in marriage. Everything seemed perfect until one day, Pio got rushed to the hospital and was diagnosed with viral encephalitis, a rare brain disease that affects the memory of the person. How will Mae surpass this ordeal? What will she do as Pio's memory starts to deteriorate? What future awaits her and her unborn child? Cast: Erich Gonzales, Patrick Garcia, Mickey Ferriols, Glenda Garcia, Alvin Anson, Simon Ibarra, Lemuel Pelayo, Victor Silayan
41	"Bahay" "House"	Dado C. Lumibao	Benson A. Logronio and Arah Jell G. Badayos	October 21, 2017
Ever since he was born, George has been dependent on his family especially on his brother Baning and sister Bernadeth. Together, they dream of finishing school together. Everything was going smoothly until Bernadette found a new set of friends and started to feel embarrassed that she has to carry her older brother to school. Despite this, Baning never left George's side and continued to serve as his legs so he can go to different places. But how far can Baning really go for his brother? Will he go as far as giving up his own dreams? As the two enter college, they are confronted with the dilemma that they want to take two different courses- George wants to pursue Business Administration, while Baning wants to take criminology. Cast: Yves Flores, Elmo Magalona, Miles Ocampo, Smokey Manaloto, Arlene Muhlach, Pinky Marquez, Crispin Pineda, Josh de Guzman, Faye Alhambra, JB Agustin
42	"Tulay" "Bridge"	Jerry Lopez Sineneng	Nikki Bunquin and Arah Jell G. Badayos	October 28, 2017
Cecille lives a happy and simple life with her family in Visayas Region. She is the 6th among the seven children of Orly, a property custodian in a power supply company, and Lucing, a housewife. But growing up, Cecille harbors hatred for Lucing who constantly gets furious with her. Cecille loses hope to survive, but Benjie and Lucing stayed with her and give her strength. Cecille then realizes their efforts to save her and soon rebuilds her trust with them. Eventually, Cecille succeeds over the curse by strengthening herself, physically and emotionally. Cast: Cristine Reyes, Marvin Agustin, Desiree del Valle, Yayo Aguila, Belle Mariano, Jef Gaitan, Richard Quan, David Chua.
43	"Kakanin" "Tidbits"	Nuel C. Naval	Benson A. Logronio and Arah Jell G. Badayos	November 4, 2017
Raised by his loving parents Max and Mary, Jayvee grows up in an impoverished household but does not stop from dreaming big and wanting more for himself and his loved ones. Jayvee, however, finds out a truth about himself that challenges everything he believes in: He is adopted and was born to a rich family. How will this affect Jayvee's relationship with his foster parents? Cast: Enchong Dee, Malou de Guzman, Ara Mina, Miguel Vergara, James Blanco, Julio Diaz, Katya Santos, Kiko Matos, Lander Vera Perez, Lance Lucido
44	"Gitara" "Guitar"	Nuel C. Naval	Mae Rose Balanay and Arah Jell Badayos	November 11, 2017
Raised by his loving parents Max and Mary, Jayvee grows up in an impoverished household but does not stop from dreaming big and wanting more for himself and his loved ones. Jayvee, however, finds out a truth about himself that challenges everything he believes in: He is adopted and was born to a rich family. How will this affect Jayvee's relationship with his foster parents? Cast: Nyoy Volante, Antoinette Taus, Louise Abuel, Boboy Garovillo, Marlo Mortel, Suzette Ranillo, Jong Cuenco, Louella de Cordova, Jess Evardone, Marc Santiago
45	"Casa" "House"	Raz de la Torre	Akeem Jordan D. Del Rosario and Arah Jell G. Badayos	November 18, 2017
Hazel was still a teenager when she left her family to go with her aunt who offered to finance her studies. She was then full of hopes and dreams, until her aunt's husband shattered them all when he took advantage of her. Devastated by what happened, Hazel came home to the province. Fate, however, remained unkind to her when another man, Bensyo, sexually abused her. Bensyo did not only sell her to a prostitute house but also got her pregnant. How did Hazel face this ordeal? How did she escape the terrible and dark world she lived in? Cast: Iza Calzado, Nonie Buencamino, Maris Racal, Jairus Aquino, Jordan Herrera, Gerald Madrid, Maria Isabel Lopez, Soliman Cruz, Eagle Riggs, Tom Olivar, Nor Domingo
46	"Siopao" "Steamed Bun"	Topel Lee	Benson A. Logronio and Arah Jell G. Badayos	November 25, 2017
Cenia and husband Dodong were living happily with their seven children, until rumors of Dodong having an affair with another woman circulated in the neighborhood. Truth about Dodong's infidelity, however, was confirmed not by Cenia but by their eldest daughter Waway. Both Cenia and Waway were then filled with anger and despair. But the hurt did not end there because Dodong got Ani pregnant and even asked Cenia to take care of Ani and his illegitimate child in his dying seconds. Fulfilling Dodong's death wish, Ani and her child stayed in Cenia's home. How long can Cenia keep up with the situation? Did Cenia and Ani get along? Cast: Vina Morales, Andrea Brillantes, Allen Dizon, Louise delos Reyes, Hyubs Azarcon, Tony Manalo
47	"Karayom" "Needle"	Nuel C. Naval	Mary Rose Colindres and Arah Jell Badayos	December 2, 2017
Ever since she found out she got infected with HIV through her late husband, Liza experienced countless bullying and mocking by people surrounding her and her family. Despite this, her family remained strong for her and even encouraged her to go out in public and tell everyone her story as the second person in the Philippines with HIV. Since then, she actively participated in an HIV advocacy group. However, despite her purest intention to raise awareness and break the stigma on people living with HIV (PLHIV), most people were still quick to pass judgment rather than being more compassionate. What other challenges did she face when she exposed her story to the public? Cast: Empress Schuck, Lito Pimentel, Rayver Cruz, Ivan Padilla, Tanya Gomez, Boboy Garovillo, Angelo Ilagan, Nikka Valencia, Erin Ocampo, Hanna Ledesma, Maritess Samson, Sebastian Castro, Roy Requejo
48	"Kidney"	Theodore Boborol	Joan P. Habana and Arah Jell G. Badayos	December 9, 2017
Although diagnosed with kidney failure, Rizza chooses to look at the brighter side of life and continues to live positively. While fighting her disease, Rizza meets and changes the life of Joel, a shy and hardworking breadwinner who learns to love himself and open his heart to love. As their relationship develops, Rizza's condition gets worse to the point where she will need a new kidney for her to survive. Because of his love for Rizza, Joel decides to become her donor. Will Rizza support Joel's decision even if his life is on the line? Cast: Alex Gonzaga, Hero Angeles, Allan Paule, Isay Alvarez, Ynez Veneracion, Simon Ibarra, Zeppi Borromeo, David Chua, Mikylla Ramirez, Nikki Gonzales
49	"Gown"	Raz de la Torre	Akeem Jordan Del Rosario and Arah Jell G. Badayos	December 16, 2017
Way before he made dresses for Anne Curtis, Kim Chiu, Kris Aquino and Miss Universe 2015 Pia Wurtzbach, Rey already knew that he was gay like his brother Brian. However, when he saw how Brian suffered after opening up about his sexual orientation, he chose to hide his real identity. Growing up, Rey looked up to Brian because of the courage and hard work his brother invested in the fashion line business the latter owned to prove their father wrong, which Rey thought he could not do. Although unexpected, their father eventually accepted Brian's identity, but Rey still continued his pretense and even pursued a career as a flight attendant. Until one day, Brian got involved in a holdup incident that caused his death and would change Rey's life forever. Cast: Dominic Ochoa, Zaijian Jaranilla, Angelo Ilagan, Aleck Bovick, Yñigo Delen, Marc Acueza, Mico Aytona, Axel Torres, Mikee Agustin, Sarah Carlos, Patrick Sugui
50	"Sumbrero" "Hat"	Dado Lumibao	Mae Rose B. Balanay and Arah Jell G. Badayos	December 23, 2017
Josephine sets aside her own life in order to take care of her mother Carmen, who is suffering from Alzheimer's disease. Cast: Toni Gonzaga, Gloria Diaz, Boots Anson-Roa, Niña Dolino, Juan Rodrigo, Karen Timbol, Denise Joaquin, Yesha Camille, Justin Cuyugan, Jojo Abellana, Luke Jickain, Kokoy de Santos, Teetin Villanueva, Joanne Marie Bugcat
