= Maalaala Mo Kaya season 24 =

Maalaala Mo Kaya
- Season 24
- Starring: Charo Santos
- No. of episodes: 50

Release
- Original network: ABS-CBN
- Original release: January 2 – December 31, 2016

Season chronology
- ← Previous; Season 23 Next → Season 25

Maalaala Mo Kaya (transl. Would you remember?; abbreviated MMK), also known as Memories in English, is a Filipino television series, which was first aired on May 15, 1991. MMK is the longest-running drama anthology on Philippine television.

== Episodes ==
#	Episode title	Directed by	Written by	Original air date	Ratings
1	"Itlog" "Egg"	Raz de la Torre	Benjamin Benson Logronio, Arah Jell Badayos	January 2, 2016 (re-aired on October 29, 2022)	N/A
Pablo considers himself lucky for having a happy home with two loving parents, Benjamin and Rita. All is well until Simon, a stranger who has nowhere to go, comes and finds shelter in their home. With Simon living with them, Pablo starts to notice strange things happening in their home, including Rita treating her husband critically. One night, Benjamin is found dead, and through a Manobo ritual, they find out that Simon is behind Benjamin's death. They soon discover cult items in Simon's belongings that Pablo's relatives say Simon used to put Rita under a love spell. Cast: Assunta de Rossi, Arjo Atayde, Dominic Ochoa, Joshua Garcia, Izzy Canillo, Gerard Pizzaras, Dianne Medina, Devon Seron, Celine Lim, Peewee O'Hara, Kyline Alcantara, Gerald Pesigan, Rhed Bustamante, Marc Santiago
2	"Bahay" "House"	Elfren Parpan Vibar	Joan Habana, Arah Jell Badayos	January 9, 2016	N/A
The pressures of life, Miho's mother "Mercedes" worked as Entertainer in Japan. Mercedes mistaken in love which was the results is Miho on her second boyfriend. Eager not to repeat the fate of Mercedes, she was so strictly in Miho. Cast: Andrea del Rosario, Brenna Garcia, Giselle Sanchez, Tess Antonio, Niña Jose, Alex Diaz, Marina Benipayo, Tom Olivar, Kazumi Porquez, Mitch Naco, Miho Nishida
3	"Kamay" "Hand"	Nuel C. Naval	Benjamin Benson Logronio, Arah Jell Badayos	January 16, 2016	N/A
In a younger age, Lyn is trying to face all the challenges in life. From the death of her father to her early motherhood. Her dream is to be a lawyer but Lyn chooses to work in Dubai in providing the needs for her children. Unfortunately, Lyn was cheated by her eligibility sponsor promised a job in Middle East. Cast: Maricar Reyes, Lotlot de Leon, James Blanco, Ynez Veneracion, Minnie Aguilar, Raquel Montesa, Gerald Madrid, Viveika Ravanes, Bea Saw, Robert Ortega, Miguel Vergara, John Michael
4	"Singsing" "Ring"	Raz de la Torre	Benjamin Benson Logronio, Arah Jell Badayos	January 23, 2016	N/A
Sashi is a transgender woman who recently broke up with her boyfriend of more than two years after he decided to ditch her for another woman. She falls in love with Rex but doesn't know that he is still in a relationship with his longtime girlfriend, Fats. Both Sashi and Fats don't want to give up Rex and choose to stay in a relationship with him. Rex, on the other hand, wants the two to simply accept each other as he is unable to make a choice between them. Cast: Joross Gamboa, Roxanne Guinoo, Polo Ravales, IC Mendoza, Lassy, Marx Topacio, Mikee Agustin
5	"Toothbrush"	Raz de la Torre	Rose Colindres, Arah Jell Badayos	February 6, 2016	25.9%
Leni Robredo was hesitant to enter politics at first. Dimples, as Leni, said that she was scared and that she wanted to be able to spend more time with her family. Cast: Dimples Romana, Marvin Agustin, Sofia Andres, Inah Estrada, Mutya Orquia, Yesha Camile, Belle Mariano, Casey Da Silva, Lowell Conales, Roden Araneta, Jed Montero, Gigi Locsin, Bryan Termulo, Joe Gruta, Jong Cuenco, Jason Fernandez, Marc Santiago, Gerard Acao
6	"Puno" "Tree"	Jeffrey Jeturian	Jimuel dela Cruz, Arah Jell Badayos	February 13, 2016	N/A
Ernesto has always known that he is gay since he was young, but has not come out because of fear of his father. He hides it and lives like any other ordinary boy. However, he meets Jonna and falls in love with the young lady and eventually becomes her boyfriend. Eventually, Ernesto is forced to leave Jonna in the province when his family decides to move to Manila. Having found the freedom to express himself, Ernesto finally reveals his true identity, undergoes a grand transformation, and becomes Barbie. As Barbie, he meets Jason and makes him forget about the love he once had for Jonna. But Ernesto soon decides to end his relationship with Jason after he learns he is just using him for money. After two years, Ernesto's family comes back to their province and as Barbie, he once again meets Jonna. Cast: Joshua Garcia, Loisa Andalio, Aleck Bovick, Rommel Padilla, Bugoy Cariño, Marlann Flores, Patrick Sugui, Johan Santos, Alora Sasam, Kamille Filoteo, Maritess Joaquin, Kokoy de Santos, Dhexie Daulat
7	"Police Uniform"	Dondon S. Santos	Benjamin Benson Logronio, Arah Jell Badayos	February 20, 2016	N/A
Raised in a lower class family, a boyish Judy grows up idolizing her hardworking parents who are supportive of her education and her interest in taekwondo. But one day, Judy's mother runs into a holdup and gets injured, marking the only time Judy sees her tough mother shed tears. Wanting to seek revenge for her mother's mishap, Judy takes up criminology in college, where she meets the man who then captivates her heart, Edmund. After graduating from college, Judy builds a family with Edmund and from then on would juggle her duties as a mother and a public servant. Until one night, Judy is tested when their one-year-old baby suffers from a high fever while she is on duty, and promises to attend to her son as soon as she gets home. However, on a bus on her way home, Judy runs into a holdup aboard the bus and is forced to stand up to foil the crime. Cast: Andi Eigenmann, Patrick Garcia, Maureen Mauricio, Minco Fabregas, Manuel Chua, Zeppi Borromeo, Lloyd Zaragoza, Mara Lopez, Hiyasmin Neri, Jai Agpangan, Art Acuña, Jimboy Martin, Barbie Imperial
8	"Backpack"	Nuel C. Naval	Benjamin Benson Logronio, Arah Jell Badayos	February 27, 2016	N/A
Tommy grew up in Long Beach, California to a broken family after his parents got divorced. However, as he and his siblings grew up, his mother became stricter and harsher, wanting them not to be led astray. Cast: Aiko Melendez, Cris Villanueva, Rochelle Barrameda, John Spainhour, Claire Ruiz, Markki Stroem, Encar Benedicto, Josh Ford, Ashley Colet, Tom Doromal, Karla Pambid, Lukas Magallano, Tommy Esguerra
9	"Pinto" "Door"	Raz de la Torre	Arah Jell Badayos	March 5, 2016	N/A
On the death of Sally's father, her mother Lydia will love again. Meanwhile, Sally's uncle turns to destroy her personality. Despite Sally's trail, she has the courage to tell her mother that she was abused by her stepfather. Cast: Sunshine Cruz, Mariel Pamintuan, Ronnie Quizon, Alex Medina, Maila Gumila, Jennifer Mendoza, Carla Martinez, Rhed Bustamante, Lander Vera-Perez, Micah Muñoz, Noel Colet, Laiza Comia, Josh De Guzman, Lance Lucido, Erin Ocampo, Kyle Banzon, Althea Guanzon
10	"Traysikel" "Trircycle"	Elfren Vibar	Rose Colindres, Arah Jell Badayos	March 12, 2016	N/A
As a kid, Rafael dreamt of becoming a teacher. His stepfather thought it would be better for him to work than study. However, Rafael would find ways to continue his studies. After clashing many times with his stepfather, Rafael's mother asked his son to run away from home after graduation. He went to Manila to seek a better future. But life was not so easy. Unable to continue his studies, he worked as a security guard to support his own family, and for years forgot about his dream to become a teacher. Until one day, his life got threatened in a robbery, making him realize that he did not want to die with unfulfilled dreams. He then went back to the province to become a tricycle driver, and saved enough money to go to college. He pursued a course in education and became a full-fledged teacher. Cast: Ronnie Lazaro, Patricia Javier, Louella de Cordova, CX Navarro, Ronnie Alonte, Sofia Millares, Faye Alhambra, Mon Confiado, Ruben Gonzaga, Miko Raval, Ryle Paolo Santiago, Richard Gomez
11	"Motorsiklo" "Motorcycle"	Jerry Lopez Sineneng	Jimuel dela Cruz, Arah Jell Badayos	March 19, 2016	N/A
Ronnie came from a wealthy family in Laguna. But everything changed when his father lost an eye from a motorcycle accident, making him unable to work. This eventually led to their family's bankruptcy. Cast: Nonie Buencamino, Ara Mina, Ronnie Alonte, Dentrix Ponce, Angelo Ilagan, CJ Navato, Joshua Dionisio, Simon Ibarra, Joaquin Reyes, Ysabel Ortega
12	"Picture"	Joan Habana, Arah Jell Badayos	Raz de la Torre	April 2, 2016	N/A
While working in Hong Kong as a domestic helper, Filipina widow Evelyn met Beth, a fellow overseas worker from Indonesia. The two women soon found a sister in each other as they became each other's confidant when Evelyn struggled with her abusive employer and Beth with her deteriorating marriage with a Filipino man. When Evelyn's contract ended, Beth decided to go with her to the Philippines and start a new life because she did not want to go back to her family in Indonesia and tell them about her failed marriage. Evelyn welcomed Beth to her home and accepted her as part of her own family, but after a few years, Evelyn decided to work abroad again in Singapore to support the needs of her three growing children. Beth then willingly took up the role of second mother to Evelyn's kids. This is just one of the many challenges including illness faced by Evelyn and Beth, whose friendship would last until they grew old, proving that friendship goes beyond race and culture. Cast: Angel Aquino, Valerie Concepcion, Neil Coleta, Michelle Vito, Kyline Alcantara, Kokoy de Santos, Veyda Inoval, Karla Cruz, Kyle Banzon, Aiko Climaco
13	"Alkansya" "Piggy Bank"	Dondon S. Santos	Benjamin Benson Logronio, Arah Jell Badayos	April 9, 2016 (re-aired on April 30, 2022)	N/A
Married couple Alan and Liza live a normal and comfortable life. Their three children Ana, Jane, and Ryan live mostly by themselves as they are all grown-up and have families of their own. Their quiet life is shattered when Alan and Liza are kidnapped by a group of rebel men. Liza escapes, while Alan is brought to Basilan as a captive. The ensuing months prove to be the family's greatest trial as the rebel group asks for an impossible amount in exchange for Alan's freedom. Liza and Ryan almost give up on the hope that Alan will return, while Ana and Jane continue with the negotiations. Alan, on the other hand, continues to live day to day in captivity, longing to return to his family. Cast: Christopher de Leon, Sylvia Sanchez, Antoinette Taus, Rayver Cruz, Louise Abuel, Richard Quan, Ron Morales, Gio Alvarez, Marlann Flores, Hyubs Azarcon, Archie Adamos, Junjun Quintana, Nico Antonio, Marx Topacio, Kiko Matos
14	"Boxing Ring"	Jerry Lopez Sineneng	Benjamin Benson Logronio, Arah Jell Badayos	April 16, 2016	N/A
Nonito Donaire's childhood was mostly miserable. Aside from always getting mocked at school because of his small stature, he also got beaten up by his grandfather whenever he would do something wrong. Soon enough, his father, Nonito "Dodong" Donaire, Sr., brought him, together with his other siblings, to the U.S., but the bullying worsened because people hit him at school. At age 11, he started training for boxing only because of Dodong's encouragement, until he became a professional boxer at 18. But he then quit boxing when he discovered that his father was having an illicit affair, only to go back to it upon the request of his mother Imelda. Nonito reunited with Dodong until another serious disagreement arose between them, when the latter expressed his disapproval of the former's relationship with a woman named Rachel Marcial. Cast: Sam Concepcion, Ian de Leon, Mickey Ferriols, Claire Ruiz, Kyle Banzon, Harvey Bautista, Niña Dolino, Gigi Locsin, Ces Aldaba, Ken Anderson, Jameson Blake, Mitch Naco, Dale Baldillo, Kyle Echarri, Philip Lampart
15	"Gitara" "Guitar"	Giselle M. Andres	Joan P. Habana, Arah Jell G. Badayos	April 23, 2016	N/A
People around Mia and NJ always thought they were perfect for each other when their love story began in college. The two experienced a fantastic first year together, until Mia's father died and NJ had to undergo a serious back operation. Although the two did not leave each other's side and remained strong through these challenges, they started to treat each other critically, and eventually started fighting constantly. Months after, their relationship came to a brutal end. Until one day, Mia and NJ decided to meet again after a long time. Cast: Ejay Falcon, Sarah Lahbati, Dante Ponce, Jobelle Salvador, Guji Lorenzana, Shey Bustamante, Johan Santos, Axel Torres, Alora Sasam, Pamu Pamorada, Chienna Filomeno, Noemi Oineza, Karen Timbol, Alexis Navarro, Margo Midwinter
16	"Riles" "Railroad"	Dado C. Lumibao	Benjamin Benson A. Logronio, Arah Jell G. Badayos	April 30, 2016	N/A
While Marilyn thought that her love and effort were enough for Barbie, Barbie joined "PBB" to reconnect with her estranged father. In the program, Barbie expressed that she still loves and recognizes Nelson as her father even though he left them. Hurt by Barbie's confession, Marilyn expressed her disappointment to Barbie, thinking that her daughter did not appreciate her love and effort. Cast: Aiko Melendez, Carlos Morales, Ashley Sarmiento, Dianne Medina, EJ Jallorina, Joj Agpangan, Mikylla Ramirez, Cheska Billiones, Lance Angelo Lucido, Lowell Conales, Paolo Santiago, Barbie Imperial
17	"Kahon" "Box"	Raz de la Torre	Akeem Jordan del Rosario, Arah Jell Badayos	May 7, 2016	N/A
Yolly is a mother who will do anything and everything for her children. Yolly and her husband have always dreamt of having children of their own and build a family. Three of their four children have complex medical needs: Their firstborn has Down syndrome, while their second and third babies have cerebral palsy. When Nick leaves to work overseas, Yolly is left with the responsibility of taking care of the children. Unfortunately, two of their children die in quick succession, causing Yolly to fall into despair. Cast: Joel Torre, Gloria Sevilla, Angeli Bayani, Junjun Quintana, Celine Lim, Gem Ramos, Maritess Samson, Patrick Sugui, Eliza Pineda, Ynna Asistio, Amy Nobleza, John Michael Gacayan, Dentrix Ponce, Faye Alhambra, John Vincent Servilla, Chunsa Jung, Santino Espinosa, Mike Austria, Tony Manalo, Jahzeel Eunice Quimoy, Nora Aunor
18	"Family Picture"	Nick Olanka	Arden Rod Condez, Arah Jell Badayos	May 14, 2016	N/A
Rasul has always dreamed of becoming a soldier. But his life takes a sudden turn when he is separated from his mother and is forced, together with his brother Roseller, to live with their father's second wife. In a barangay in Pikit, Cotabato, Rasul and Roseller are exposed to myriads of armed men and even children their age who are members of a rebel group. At seven, Rasul is encouraged to join their group, starts training, and learns to fight for the group's ideology. After five years, Rasul is about to become a commander. But his mother suddenly appears to offer him and his brother a better life. Cast: Izzy Canillo, Desiree del Valle, Pen Medina, Victor Neri, Wendell Ramos, Angelo Alayon, Jenny Miller, Hiyasmin Neri, Franco Rodriguez, Sofia Millares, Winryll Banaag
19	"Pasa" "Bruise"	Dondon S. Santos	Benson A. Logronio, Arah Jell G. Badayos	May 21, 2016	N/A
Rommel grows up with his biological mother Mila, his biological father Rody, and his father's wife Bita. He is teased by his friends because of his family's non-traditional set-up, but both Mila and Bita assure Rommel that he is lucky to have two mothers. Aside from being confused over the complicated relationship of his parents, Rommel accepts Mila and Bita as his mothers. But things take a dark turn when his father's abusive behavior leads to Bita's decision to flee their complicated situation. Cast: Diego Loyzaga, Raikko Mateo, Jay Manalo, Precious Lara Quigaman, Andrea del Rosario, Gerard Pizzaras, Alex Castro, Veyda Inoval, Lance Lucido
20	"Puno ng Mangga" "Mango Tree"	Efren Vibar	Nikki Bunquin, Arah Jell G. Badayos	May 28, 2016	N/A
Jeremiah and Samson grow-up close as brothers, with Samson the older of the two. Samson is happy-go-lucky and friendly, while Jeremiah is serious and quiet. Growing into teenagers, they start their very first experiences with love. Samson is a persistent admirer, openly courting, and unrelenting despite being frequently rejected. Jeremiah, on the other hand, is more reserved, shy, and is always pushed by his older brother to make a move. As Jeremiah (19) enters the same college as his brother, they have a gentleman's agreement. They are not to meddle in each other's love interests and they are most definitely not allowed to court the same girl. Jeremiah, who is a strict rule abider, respects this agreement. While Samson is quick to bend it, Samson compares Jeremiah's love interest to his own, a fellow Law student named Fe (21). Samson is open with his courting of Fe. Almost every day, he gives her gifts, poems, but Fe rejects him every time. Despite this, Samson still encourages. Cast: Joseph Marco, Matt Evans, Ria Atayde, Maureen Mauricio, Allan Paule, Daria Ramirez, Tanya Gomez, Denise Joaquin, Jed Montero, Dentrix Ponce, Josh Ford
21	"Hijab"	Dado C. Lumibao	Benjamin Benson Logronio, Arah Jell G. Badayos	June 4, 2016	N/A
Patma is a bright young girl who beams with positivity despite being born in a poor family. A consistent honor student, Patma also works at the market to help her struggling family. Seeing fellow Muslim kids in her neighborhood who do not go to school, she dreams of becoming a teacher in hopes of helping them someday. However, tragedy strikes as Patma's neighborhood is destroyed by a fire, including her school and her family and others evacuate to her former school because they have nowhere to go. After her family has lost everything, Patma's mother also loses hope and even discourages Patma from dreaming of a better life. It also does not help her that the kids at her new school bullies her for being a Muslim. Cast: Princess Punzalan, Abby Bautista, Allen Dizon, Peewee O'Hara, Kokoy de Santos, Dhexie Daulat, Teetin Villanueva, Jomar Santilices
22	"Pole"	Jerry Lopez Sineneng	Arah Jell G. Badayos	June 11, 2016	N/A
Christina was happily engaged and was ready to settle down with her long-time boyfriend Jay. Unfortunately, Jay, whom Christina considered the love of her life, suddenly broke off the engagement leaving Christina devastated and depressed. One day, Christina's friends invite her to join them in their pole dancing class. It was a difficult experience to begin with as Christina struggles to do pole dancing right but then she realizes that pole dancing has become a distraction from her heartache. After spending more and more time on pole dancing classes, Christina and her friends decided to have their own pole dancing company - Polecats Manila. However, as Christina's life seems to be turning around, she accidentally runs into her once ex-fiancée reminding her of her painful past. Cast: Jessy Mendiola, Vin Abrenica, Karen Timbol, Lorenzo Mara, Lollie Mara, Regine Tolentino, Maria Isabel Lopez, Cai Cortez, Danita Paner, Kyra Custodio, Allyson McBride, AJ Muhlach
23	"Kweba" "Cave"	Nuel C. Naval	Jimuel dela Cruz, Arah Jell G. Badayos	June 18, 2016 (re-aired on October 15, 2022)	N/A
Due to poverty, Juan did not get the opportunity to finish his schooling and promised himself that when the time comes, he will do everything to give his own children a proper education. But raising a family proved to be difficult for him and wife Melissa. Despite Juan working two jobs, making ends meet was impossible for the couple, forcing Melissa to look for work and ended up working far away from their kids. After some time, Juan does not hear from Melissa anymore and later finds out that she has been seeing someone else. Making matters worse, a storm devastates Juan's home, leaving him with the difficult decision to live in a cave. His kids are forced to walk four kilometers a day to go to school and have to endure insults from their classmates for their living environment. Cast: Zanjoe Marudo, Xyriel Manabat, Louise Abuel, Alfonso Yñigo Delen, Dawn Chang, Tess Antonio, Justin Cuyugan, Lemuel Pelayo, Karla Pambid, Jennifer Colet, Faye Alhambra
24	"Picture"	Dondon S. Santos	Joan P. Habana, Arah Jell G. Badayos	June 25, 2016	N/A
Caitie is the first daughter of married couple Tine and Jayjay. The couple met when both were rebuilding their lives from failed relationships and suddenly found themselves in each other's arms. Seeing each other as life partners, they planned to get married and to have children. To the couple, the birth of Caitie made their union perfect and as it stood were both very happy on the day they first laid eyes on Caitie. When Caitie was three years old, symptoms of a mystery illness began surfacing such as rashes all over her body. In a span of three months, Caitie had to be confined in three different hospitals as doctors could not seem to diagnose her condition. Jayjay felt responsible for Caitie's condition due to his family's medical history, while Tine felt so lost that she already thought of ending their marriage. Consumed by hopelessness, they shared Caitie's story online to find support. An overwhelming response came their way and Caitie came to be known as Courageous Caitie. Cast: Shaina Magdayao, JC de Vera, Miel Espinoza, Bernadette Allyson, Dante Ponce, Aubrey Miles, Aiko Climaco, Miko Raval, Kenzo Gutierrez, Mikee Agustin
25	"Bangketa" "Sidewalk"	Raz de la Torre	Arah Jell G. Badayos	July 2, 2016	N/A
A homeless girl named Naning lives in the streets of Quiapo under the guidance of Sallie and Bong. Naning has many plans in life, first priority being to have a better life for her family and to finish a degree course in college. Naning decides to find work and support herself and her sister in order for them to go to school. Naning's ability to be independent early on in her life helps her reach high school but she also accepts the fact that high school may be as far as they can go. Suddenly, Rick, a photographer, finds Naning studying on the sidewalk. Rick fins inspiration in her determination and takes photos of her in hopes of sharing her story. Rick shares the photos in social networking sites and they quickly become viral; messages of encouragement for Naning from the social media community. Cast: Amy Austria, Jane Oineza, Perla Bautista, Celine Lim, Juan Rodrigo, Rhed Bustamante, Simon Ibarra, Jed Montero, Althea Guanzon, Bianca Bentulan
26	"Sulat" "Letter"	Raz S. de la Torre	Benjamin Benson A. Logronio, Arah Jell G. Badayos	July 9, 2016	N/A
June and Jess are the perfect example of identical twins as they not only look like each other but also act the same way. Sporting the same hairstyle, sharing the same taste in fashion, and using the same personal items, there isn't anything that can tell them apart. The two sisters share a strong relationship but had no idea that it will be put to the test once they enter college. Jess meets Luis and eventually falls in love with him. June had her doubts about Luis at first but as time passed Luis became close to her as well. In an unexpected turn of events, Luis suddenly confesses his true love for June and his plans to leave Jess to be with her instead. Cast: Jai Agpangan, Joj Agpangan, Smokey Manaloto, Ana Capri, Ronnie Alonte, Matet de Leon, Micah Muñoz, CJ Navato
27	"Droga" "Drug"	Dondon S. Santos	Nikki A. Bunquin, Arah Jell G. Badayos	July 16, 2016	N/A
Emily's father leaves their family for another woman when she was young. Growing up, she promises herself that she would not let her children experience what she has gone through when she builds her own family. But at 27, Emily gives birth to Cheska whose father also left her for another woman. A few years later, Emily finds a new love in Larry. They eventually got married and have two children. Larry also loves Cheska like his own child. Everything seems perfect until Larry becomes addicted to drugs and starts to terrify Emily when under the detrimental influence. Soon, Emily and her children leave Larry. But a few months later, Larry asks for forgiveness and promises to change for his family. Emily gives her husband another chance and lives with him though her children especially Cheska is against her decision. Larry becomes more violent and threatens to kill Emily and their children, so Emily decides to leave Larry again. One day, while Emily is out looking for money, Larry takes Cheska hostage. Cast: Alessandra de Rossi, Xyriel Manabat, Joem Bascon, Maureen Mauricio, Tom Olivar, Maris Racal, Alora Mae Sasam, Joanne Marie Bugcat, Zarah Mae Deligero
28	"Kadena" "Chain"	Elfren P. Vibar	Mae Rose Barrientos Balanay, Arah Jell G. Badayos	July 23, 2016	N/A
Pauleen is the daughter of Bernard from an affair out of wedlock. She was still a baby when her father left her under the care of distant relative Loling. Many years passed and Bernard has already moved on with his life together with wife Melda and their children. Until one day, Loling knocked on their door and returned Pauleen to them. According to Loling, Pauleen became an alcoholic and was also suspected of using illegal drugs after she learned that she was just adopted. Bernard saw this as an opportunity to correct the decision he reluctantly made and finally be a father to Pauleen. However, even under her care Pauleen seemed to revert to her old behavior and as Bernard realized, maybe even worse. Cast: Coleen Garcia, Joey Marquez, Alma Moreno, Kristel Fulgar, Nikki Bagaporo, Brace Arquiza, Amy Nobleza, Lollie Mara, Jerry O'Hara, Gilleth Sandico
29	"Banda" "Band"	Jerome Chavez Pocoban	Mary Rose Colindres, Arah Jell G. Badayos	July 30, 2016	N/A
A frustrated singer-songwriter, Jack (mid-30s) sees a bright future for his musically-inclined teen sons Marko and Niko when they competed in a local talent competition. With support from his wife Vivien (30s), Jack would teach his sons to hone their craft and would eventually form a full band (with dancers) that accommodates the entertainment needs of local and out of town events such as weddings, birthdays, and other occasions. Everything is going well until Jack starts an affair with one of the band's dancers, Lyca, an 18-year-old who was Marko's ex-girlfriend. When the cat came out of the bag, Vivien leaves Jack and the kids. Marko and Niko are crushed, and express their dismay to Jack in social media. The two also starts to treat Jack coldly during band rehearsals. However, Jack continues his affair with Lyca. One day, Niko confronts Jack which leads to the former almost hitting his son. That day, Jack realizes he needs to fix his family before it completely falls apart. Jack breaks up with Lyca, apologizes to his sons, and to Vivien. Vivien forgives Jack after the latter's several failed attempts, and so does Marko and Niko who are just happy again to see their family complete. Cast: Cherry Pie Picache, Jay Manalo, Sam Concepcion, Vin Abrenica, Karen Reyes, Jon Lucas, Claire Ruiz, Jane de Leon, Lei Navarro, JM Gacayan
30	"Radyo" "Radio"	Raz de la Torre	Joan P. Habana, Arah Jell G. Badayos	August 6, 2016	N/A
Mario (6) dreams of becoming a radio personality at an early age because he is fascinated with listening to AM radio - the only means of entertainment they have in Lebak, Sultan Kudarat. However, fate tests his courage to pursue this dream when he is diagnosed with leukemia at six years old. He is crushed, but with the help of his mother Erlinda who gives him all the necessary support that he can get, he recovers from his illness and manages to become a DJ at 20 years old. Mario's world is turned upside down for one more time when his health fails him because of the hard work he has been putting at the radio station. He gets up at 2 in the morning for his 4 AM program a couple days a week and commutes for almost two hours, resulted to his white blood cell count to drop bigtime. Worried for the life of his son, Erlinda forces Mario to stop tiring himself from working while he is finishing his studies. Mario obeys his mother but is gutted because he has to abandon his life-long dream. But in his last year in college, Mario finds an opportunity to live his dream without sacrificing his health when he applies for a DJ job which slot is in the evening. Concealing this from Erlinda, Mario pursues the sound of his dream while studying and finishes college without having any health complications. In the end, Mario goes on to have a successful career in radio and is still without a trace of sickness at present. Cast: Xian Lim, Bugoy Cariño, Lara Quigaman, William Lorenzo, Maggie dela Riva, Gigi Locsin, John Vincent Servilla, Angelo Alayon
31	"Beerhouse"	Garry Fernando	Mary Rose Colindres, Arah Jell G. Badayos	August 13, 2016	N/A
A neglected teenager Julia (16) resorts to joining beauty pageants and bikini opens in order to get her mother's attention. She mindlessly accepts a neighbor's offer to go to Zamboanga City to join a cultural dance group. However, Julia later finds out that she was fooled into a ploy to work as a sexy dancer, leading her to being a sex worker. A few months later, Julia meets Denise (22) a man-hater club dancer who provides for her parents. As they go through the challenges in their lives together, they develop a deep friendship with one another. Julia finds an older sister in Denise and Denise finds a younger sibling in Julia. Their sisterhood further solidifies when Denise gets impregnated by a runaway, but receives warm and full support like no other from Julia. Almost a year later, Julia finds an opportunity in a high-end club in Cebu City for a much higher remuneration. Enticed by the apparent advantage, she invites Denise to come with her. Tension arises when some of their workmates soon learn of their plan and become interested correspondingly. Wanting to share their seemingly stroke of luck, Julia and Denise tag along the group to Cebu City to transfer to a bigger club. As the group arrives in Cebu City, a group of mariners seizes and turn them over to the custody of the Department of Social Welfare and Development (DSWD) to serve as a warning for qualified human trafficking. A year later, the two are officially arrested for the same crime. In spite of the arrest, Julia (26) and Denise (32) learn that sticking together will get them through all the adversities in their friendship. Cast: Meg Imperial, Valerie Concepcion, Maila Gumila, Debbie Garcia, Jai'Ho, Kaiser Boado
32	"Toga"	Frasco Mortiz	Joan P. Habana, Arah Jell G. Badayos	August 20, 2016	N/A
Growing up, Analyn (10) and her brother Allan (16) were never deprived – all their needs and wants are provided to them by their father Sulpicio (45), who manages a general merchandise shop and runs a poultry business in Pagadian City. Analyn enjoys the wealthy and comfortable lifestyle and admires Sulpicio's unbounded capacity to support their family, especially his epileptic and dependent wife, Luzminda (41). Luzminda and Sulpicio raise their children in a family that is God-centered, disciplined, well-provided for and above all, loving. But the tables drastically turn when Sulpicio suddenly dies of a liver complication that he never told his dependent family about. His sudden death unravels the unpreparedness of his family, especially the then spoiled Analyn. In reduced circumstances, Analyn (20s) sees how Luzminda suffers from depression and her aggravating epilepsy and how Allan goes on to rebellion. Barely adapting to this and the abrupt beggary, Analyn is forced to stand up for their family and strive hard to sustain the legacy of Sulpicio. To finish her studies, Analyn comes to experience being a house help and endure what was then impossible. But empowered by his father's love, Analyn braves her way through the stumbling blocks in life eventually succeeds as a licensed educator. Cast: Maris Racal, Veyda Inoval, Cris Villanueva, Aleck Bovick, John Manalo, Via Veloso, Alchris Galura
33	"Korona" "Crown"	Dado Lumibao	Jaymar Santos Castro, Arah Jell G. Badayos	August 27, 2016	N/A
Cast: Kim Chiu, Sylvia Sanchez, Jong Cuenco, Johan Santos, Lassy Marquez, Jef Gaitan
34	"Pantalan" "Dock"	Raz de la Torre	Benjamin Benson A. Logronio, Arah Jell G. Badayos	September 3, 2016	N/A
Roselle (16) and Jerome (16) become best friends in high school. Because of their many similarities, the two become inseparable. Their friends would tease them about their closeness but they would always dismiss the idea of them having a romantic relationship. They always say they can't be more than friends. True enough, they soon both get into different romantic relationships. Roselle and Jerome's friendship gets tested when Roselle decides to distance herself from Jerome because her boyfriend gets jealous with their closeness. But still, their friendship prevails. Years pass, and one day, Jerome and Roselle find themselves deeply in love with each other. Cast: Sofia Andres, Diego Loyzaga, Daisy Reyes, Eric Fructuoso, Marlo Mortel, Yana Asistio, Bryan Termulo, Michelle Vito, Gem Ramos, Alex Díaz, Jane de Leon
35	"Pintura" "Paint"	Elfren P. Vibar	Benjamin Benson A. Logronio, Arah Jell G. Badayos	September 10, 2016	N/A
Ilong has been taking care of his grandson Gilbert ever since he was just eight months old after his mother Elang left him to look for work in the city. Unfortunately, Elang fails to return to her firstborn after getting pregnant by another man. Since then, Ilong has worked so hard to provide for Gilbert, whose effeminate behavior he persistently shrugs off. Scared that his grandfather might not approve of his sexuality, Gilbert hides it from him and only openly expresses himself in school. Gilbert is about to enter college when Ilong starts losing jobs due to his old age and fails to provide for his grandson's education. Cast: Phillip Salvador, Jerome Ponce, JB Agustin, Ella Cruz, Manuel Chua, Eric Nicolas, EJ Jallorina, Dang Cruz, Lui Manansala, Josh de Guzman, Nico Antonio, Jirianne Montilla
36	"Popcorn"	Frasco Mortiz	Mae Rose Barrientos Balanay, Arah Jell G. Badayos	September 17, 2016 (re-aired on February 19, 2022)	N/A
Amy grew up in a family that frequently treated her badly. When she becomes a mother she vows to protect her children and ensure they never suffer like her. In her attempt to do so, she works abroad as a domestic helper. But when she leaves her family for Singapore, her marriage unravels, leaving her children to fend for themselves. Her eldest daughter Nelia, left behind in the Philippines, rises to the occasion and takes care of her younger siblings. While Amy works abroad, Nelia and her siblings suffer at the hands of their relatives. Despite their situation, Nelia endures the suffering because in her mind she thinks her mother is also quietly suffering abroad to give them a better future. However, when a relative starts telling lies about Amy, making her out to be living the good life abroad by throwing herself at any man she meets, Nelia starts to doubt her mother. When she confronts Amy about the lies, Amy becomes hurt that Nelia would even believe the rumors. Cast: Aiko Melendez, Dominic Ochoa, Miles Ocampo, Abby Bautista, CX Navarro, Pinky Amador, Nikki Bagaporo, Gerald Madrid, Angelo Ilagan, Raquel Montesa, Raine Salamante, Tom Olivar, Noel Colet, Alfonso Yñigo Delen, Joaquin Reyes
37	"Silver Medal"	Dado C. Lumibao	Mary Rose Colindres	September 24, 2016 (re-aired on August 14, 2021)	N/A
Hidilyn Diaz belongs to a poor family in Zamboanga City. Her childhood is filled with days of enduring a half-empty stomach. The worst of it is she feels that she never gets the attention and love she needed to get through her family's struggles. Her parents and siblings are always out, and she feels alone even when they are around. In 2002, she discovers weight lifting when she is roaming around the neighborhood and finds her cousins lifting branches of wood - they are being trained for an upcoming competition. She invites herself to their training sessions and she becomes addicted to the sport. Years pass, Hidilyn is able to compete locally and internationally, but still feels underwhelmed especially when she comes home because her parents and siblings don't seem to give her the affection that she craves for her entire life. They are only interested in what she bought for them from her out of town and country trips. Hidilyn feels sad because other people have started to recognize. Cast: Jane Oineza, Smokey Manaloto, Maricel Morales, Monsour del Rosario, Sofia Millares, Dominic Roque, Ahron Villena, Hero Angeles, Kokoy de Santos, Mico Aytona, Brace Arquiza, Laiza Comia, John Vincent Servilla
38	"Salamin" "Mirror"	Raz de la Torre	Jaymar Santos Castro, Arah Jell G. Badayos	October 1, 2016	N/A
Josef is well known for his talent in singing, intelligence, flawless skin, and good looks. He earns money by singing in prestigious hotels. Luck has always been on his side. Because of his good looks he got ahead in life, and was a so-called "Golden Boy." He becomes used to getting what he wants. He begins using his power to judge and to humiliate others. But everything changes, when Josef gets afflicted with Psoriasis, a chronic inflammatory skin disease. This turns his perfect world upside down. He loses his confidence, becomes miserable and a recluse. Everything he had disappears. Until a doctor friend makes him realize that he is more than his looks. Encouraged by this Josef uses his charismatic personality to help those like him who have psoriasis, and pioneers the Psoriasis Philippines support group. Cast: JC de Vera, Irma Adlawan, Juan Rodrigo, Jairus Aquino, Louise Abuel, Lorenzo Mara, Kazel Kinouchi, Kyle Banzon, Kazumi Porquez
39	"Picture"	Dado C. Lumibao	Benjamin Benson A. Logronio, Arah Jell G. Badayos	October 15, 2016	N/A
Since childhood, Bong already knows that he likes boys but does not have the courage to come out to his father, Fernando . So when his father died, Bong decides to let his real self shine through, which his mother, Lolet, fully accepts. Years later, Bong meets Nick and eventually becomes his boyfriend. Even when Bong decides to go to Madrid to fulfill his dream for his family, Nick remains committed to him. Until one day, Bong finds out that Nick is already married to a woman. Cast: Malou de Guzman, Albie Casiño, Neil Coleta, Luke Jickain, Marnie Lapuz, Lollie Mara, Mike Lloren, Helga Krapf, Dexie Daulat, JM Ibañez, Jomar Santilices, Jiriane Montilla, MC Calaquian
40	"Armas" "Weapon"	Garry Fernando	Joan P. Habana, Arah Jell G. Badayos	October 22, 2016	N/A
At a young age, Joseph (Zaijian Jaranilla), together with his siblings, lived a life of chaos and uncertainty. They were born to parents Johnny (Joem Bascon) and Aida (Antoinette Taus) - both members of the New People's Army (NPA). He grew up fearing for their lives and always in hiding. Throughout all this, Johnny made sure that he instilled in Joseph the values of protecting others from the abuse of powerful individuals. Cast: Zaijian Jaranilla, Joem Bascon, Antoinette Taus, Daria Ramirez, Marco Masa, John Manalo, Hyubs Azarcon, Levi Ignacio, Tart Carlos, Roy Requejo, Kris Martinez
41	"Anino" "Shadow"	Elfren P. Vibar	Akeem Jordan D. del Rosario, Arah Jell G. Badayos	October 29, 2016	N/A
Victor desires a happy and simple life for his family. A determined and religious provider, he puts up a small bakery in Iba, Zambales with his wife, Marites. Seeing Victor provide the needs and wants of their family, Marites draws strength from his husband. Soon, Victor comes across and helps a homeless old lady, Aling Maring (60's) with her drug addict son Benwho seek food and shelter from him. He accepts them like family, but conflict arises in their household when the two suddenly take his entire income and ran away. Feeling betrayed, Victor suffers from depression and later turns his attention to gambling, distressing Marites and their children. The tables completely turn when Victor starts to become inscrutable as he experiences delusions and hallucinations – from being unexpectedly violent to his eldest son Carlo (7), to digging corpses, and burying saint figurines on spur of moment. All of these agonize Marites, while their children experience bullying in school due to Victor's condition. Marites decides to have Victor checked through folk healers and professional doctors but to no avail. Conflicted by these horrors, she then leaves Victor in a mental facility and starts anew with their children. Just when Marites loses hope, she comes across Victor who proves that he can still provide for their family despite his continuing disorder. In the end, Marites still accepts Victor and promises to give back to her husband who continues to battle with schizophrenia. Cast: Zanjoe Marudo, Isabel Oli, Eva Darren, Boom Labrusca, Encar Benedicto, Zeppi Borromeo, Minco Fabregas, Lance Lucido, Chunsa Jung, Mica Javier
42	"Paruparo" "Butterfly"	Raz de la Torre	Mae Rose Barrientos Balanay, Arah Jell G. Badayos	November 5, 2016	N/A
Genesis is a loving child, who aspires to be an artist just like her father Isco. Her paintings may be bright and full of colors, but her dull and dark life is a great contrast of her masterpieces. Her mother Emma disapproves of her love for art and sees it as a waste of time. Instead, she thinks it would be better to just focus on taking care of Taking, Genesis' brother with epilepsy. With the rejection she experiences, painting helps her ease her pain, making each of them a great part of her life. Soon, her mother is unexpectedly diagnosed with a chronic illness. Though it breaks her heart, Genesis makes a sacrifice of selling her priced masterpieces to pay the hospital bills and buy medication for her mother. Cast: Sue Ramirez, Nash Aguas, Sharmaine Arnaiz, Michael Flores, Mutya Orquia, Josh de Guzman
43	"Halo-halo"	Mae Cruz-Alviar	Benson A. Logronio, Arah Jell G. Badayos	November 12, 2016	N/A
Gellen is a strong willed woman, who faces life's struggles head on. Determined to achieve her dreams, she works for a fast food restaurant to provide for her studies. There, she meets Jomz, the man she has fallen in love with. It is love at first sight for her. Being the go-getter that she is, Gellen does everything for Jomz to notice her, but her love remains unrequited. However, little does she know that Jomz also has feelings for her, but just does not have the courage to court her. Despite this, Gellen does not give up and still pursues him. She makes an effort to see him and always be at his side. Cast: Ejay Falcon, Ritz Azul, Teresa Loyzaga, Efren Reyes, Karen Timbol, Jon Lucas, Joj Agpangan, Joseph Bitangcol, Andre Garcia, Mike Austria, Kamille Filoteo
44	"Wedding Ring"	Garry Fernando	Benson A. Logronio, Arah Jell G. Badayos	November 19, 2016	N/A
Malou a caring, sensitive girl meets and falls in love with happy-go-lucky, and cheerful RJ. They marry, hoping for a bright future together. RJ starts to work in Abu Dhabi to provide for Malou and their daughter Arem. However in Abu Dhabi he suffers from cardiac arrest, and falls into a comatose. Malou and Arem rush to his side. Malou prays for RJ to be returned to her, promising to take care and love him in whatever state he is returned to her. RJ eventually recovers, but he isn't exactly the same man Malou fell in love with. Despite all the trials, Malou stays by RJ's side. Because no matter how many changes they face, their love remains the same. Cast: Angeline Quinto, Erik Santos, Lotlot de Leon, Allan Paule, Sharmaine Suarez, Kyra Custodio, Fourth Solomon
45	"Rehas" "Railing"	Frasco Mortiz	Joan Habana, Arah Jell Badayos	November 26, 2016	N/A
Gwen lives an extravagant life as part of a rich and influential political clan. But even with the fortunes she has, she still aches for the love and support of her mother, who does not seem to accept her, mainly because of her sexuality and failure to do good in her studies. After discovering her clan's corrupt and unjust practices, her then peaceful life was disrupted with the turn of events. Even if it's against her will, she eventually becomes one of the accomplices in her uncle's rape case, and for nine months, she, together with her uncle and men hide in the mountain. But as time passes by she is consumed by her conscience. Standing up for what is right, she submits herself to justice and chooses to suffer behind the bars of Correctional Institution for Women. Cast: Andrea Brillantes, Dante Rivero, TJ Trinidad, Carla Martinez, Hero Angeles, Patrick Sugui, Almira Muhlach, Faye Alhambra, Erin Ocampo, Lui Villaruz, Johan Santos, AJ Urquia, John Michael Gacayan
46	"Medical Result"	Elfren Vibar	Arah Jell Badayos	December 3, 2016	N/A
Before Rina and Gabby fell in love, numerous misfortunes had struck Rina. In one of her stints while working abroad, she fell in love with the wrong man who got her pregnant and eventually left her. As a single mother, she kept her hopes alive and tried her luck in Dubai to provide for her daughter. However, several months into her contract, she was raped by her employer. Rina's sufferings didn't end there. Her dream of having a better life was crushed when she found out that she had acquired Human Immunodeficiency Virus (HIV) as a result of the rape while she was recovering in the Philippines. On the verge of giving up on life, Rina accidentally met Gabby, a member of an HIV organization, and, like her, is also HIV-positive. After Gabby's wife died of complications from HIV, he and Rina became closer to each other as they tried to give color to each other's life. Eventually, their relationship blossomed from being friends to lovers. Cast: Coleen Garcia, Xian Lim, Assunta de Rossi, Carlos Agassi, Carla Humphries, Sophia Reola, Ashley Sarmiento, Tess Antonio
47	"Singkwenta Pesos" "Fifty Pesos"	Dado C. Lumibao	Benson A. Logronio and Arah Jell G. Badayos	December 10, 2016	N/A
At an early age, Awra or McNeal Briguela in real life, knew that he wanted to be like his idol Vice Ganda when would grow up. Even his parents believed that he could be an actor someday after seeing his gift in dancing, acting, and doing comedy. They have always been very supportive of his dreams and even his identity. But his happy family was shaken by the unexpected departure of his mother, Marivic. His father Oneal was very devastated about the situation and even began neglecting his duties as a father to Awra and his siblings. The sudden change affected Awra very much, since he grew up knowing that his father was a loving and understanding man. Cast: Awra Briguela, Janus del Prado, Aleck Bovick, Eliza Pineda, Amy Nobleza, Crispin Pineda, Madz Nicolas, Gerald Madrid, Lance Lucido
48	"Karnabal" "Carnival"	Dado C. Lumibao	Mark Duane Angos and Arah Jell Badayos	December 17, 2016	N/A
Ever since he was a kid, Ramon has always been fascinated with rollercoasters and other theme park rides. He would even imagine himself trying out all the rides in their local carnival. Sadly though, his mother could not afford it so he improvised rides from his surroundings instead. As an adult, Ramon went to Manila and got a job in a popular amusement park. With sheer determination, hard work, and passion, he climbed up the ranks, got promoted, and eventually established his own company that manufactures Philippine-made amusement rides alongside his wife Annie. Things were going so well until tragedy struck his family and his business. Cast: Yves Flores, Loisa Andalio, Allan Paule, Mickey Ferriols, Tanya Gomez, Nanding Josef, JB Agustin, Richard Quan, Heaven Peralejo, John Bermundo, Jane de Leon, Maritess Joaquin
49	"Luneta Park"	Raz de la Torre	Akeem Jordan D. del Rosario and Arah Jell G. Badayos	December 24, 2016	N/A
Lorena and her husband Norberto have always strived to build a prosperous family for their children. Through hard work, they were able to put up a successful chicharon, balut, and peanut business. Life seems to be going so well for their family until super typhoon Yolanda hit them. The devastating tragedy separated Lorena, Norberto, and their children from each other. Cast: Claudine Barretto, Dominic Ochoa, Maris Racal, Louise Abuel, Marc Santiago, Alfonso Yñigo Delen, Neil Coleta, Claire Ruiz, Justin Cuyugan, John Vincent Servilla
50	"Mikropono" "Microphone"	Garry Fernando	Joan Habana and Arah Jell G. Badayos	December 31, 2016	N/A
Before being known as the 'Blind Balladeer of Bacolod,' Carl had already fallen in love with music. At a young age, he knew that he had a great voice that dared him to dream to become a famous singer someday. However, it was not an easy road for him since any opportunity that knocked upon him fell short of his hopes. Unluckily, while trying to pursue a singing career, he got used by others for money. Subsequently, Carl began to lose his will to dream and succeed in singing. Cast: Zaijian Jaranilla, Victor Neri, Maricel Morales, Ana Roces, Lander Vera Perez, Maila Gumila, Alex Diaz, Joaquin Reyes, Nathaniel Britt
