= Kitkat (comedian) =

Filipino actress

- Born: Soraya Ray Lopez Bañas; September 23, 1984 (age 41); Manila, Philippines
- Occupations: Singer; actress; comedian; host; endorser
- Years active: 2004–present
- Agent: Star Magic (2004–2020)

Soraya Ray Lopez Bañas (born September 23, 1984), known professionally as Kitkat, is a singer, comedian, TV host, and actress in the Philippines. She is known as "The Stolen Diva" and is managed by Star Magic. Kitkat performs as a stand-up singer and comedian at The Punchline, Laffline, and Metro Comedy Bar. Her first solo concert took place in January 2009 at Metro Bar. She often portrays sidekick roles in television series and movies. Additionally, she has appeared on the game show The Singing Bee.

== Early life ==
Kitkat was born as Soraya Ray Lopez Bañas on September 23, 1987, in Manila, Philippines. At seven years old, she was a grand finalist in a children's beauty contest on GMA 7's Lunch Date and was named the 5-week champion of Tanghalan ng Kampeon, hosted by Pilita Corrales and Bert Tawa Marcelo. She was also featured on the children's show Yan ang Bata during her childhood. Kitkat participated in amateur singing contests across various cities and on television while still a child. During her college years, she worked as a back-up singer and band member with Willie Revillame. She later became a singer and stand-up comedian at Punchline, Laffline, and Metro Bar, and acted in the afternoon teleserye Maid in Heaven. She holds a Bachelor of Arts in International Studies from the College of the Holy Spirit, graduating in 2004.

Following the shutdown of ABS-CBN on May 5, 2020, due to the network's failure to secure a franchise renewal, Kitkat became a host on Net 25's noontime show Happy Time. She joined the daily noontime variety program in September 2020 and co-hosted until February 2021, alongside veteran comedians and former Eat Bulaga! hosts Anjo Yllana and Janno Gibbs.

== Filmography ==
=== Television ===
Year	Title	Role
2004	Maid in Heaven	
2005	M.R.S. (Most Requested Show)	Herself/Co-host
2005	Kaya Mo Ba 'To?	
2005	Vidjoking	
2005	Quizon Avenue	
2006	Calla Lily	Jane
2006	Sa Piling Mo	
2006	Komiks Presents: Da Adventures of Pedro Penduko	Maalindog
2007	Komiks Presents: Pedro Penduko at ang mga Engkantao	Maalindog
2007	Your Song Presents: Wala Ng Hahanapin Pa	Kaye
2007	Your Song Presents: Humanap Ka Ng Panget	Paula
2008	Sineserye Presents: Patayin Sa Sindak Si Barbara	Tina Magbintang
2008	Iisa Pa Lamang	Louella
2008–2009	Midnight DJ: Possessions	
2009	Parekoy	Sharon
2009	Komiks Presents: Komiks Presents: Nasaan Ka Maruja?	Debbie
2009	Dahil May Isang Ikaw	Stephanie "Stef" Miranda
2009	Maalaala Mo Kaya: Karnabal	Mabel
2009	Your Song Presents: Sa Kanya Pa Rin	Trina
2010	Showtime	Herself/Guest Judge
2010	Pidol's Wonderland	
2010	Precious Hearts Romances Presents: Impostor	Arita
2010	Midnight DJ: Baklitang Manananggal	
2010	Maalaala Mo Kaya: Basura	Len's friend
2011	Your Song Presents: Kim	Lilian
2011	Green Rose	Mara
2011	Precious Hearts Romances Presents: Mana Po	Young Ginny
2011	Wansapanataym: Ina'y Ko Po	Cutie
2011	Wansapanataym: Mga Alipin Ng Lumang Aklatan	Pahina
2011	Maalaala Mo Kaya: Kape	Pam
2012	Wansapanataym: Dollhouse	Lorna
2012	Maalaala Mo Kaya: Flyers	Gloria
2013	It's Showtime	Herself/Mentor
2013	Apoy sa Dagat	Young Tessie
2013	It's Showtime	Herself/Guest Judge
2013	Banana Nite: Ihaw Na!	Herself
2013	Maalaala Mo Kaya: VHF Radio	Liza
2013, 2014	The Singing Bee	Herself/Contestant, challenger in 2013 against Santiago, and in 2014 against Jugs & Corpuz; 3-day defending champion.
2015	Maalaala Mo Kaya: Jeep	Emily
2015	Got to Believe	Betty
2015	Two Wives	Mimi Olasco
2015	Forevermore	Shiela
2015	Princess in the Palace	Portia
2015	The Ryzza Mae Show	Herself/Guest
2016	CelebriTV	Herself/Guest
2016	Kalyeserye	Yaya In
2016	Eat Bulaga!	Yaya In
2016	Dear Uge	Bernadette
2016	Mars	Herself/Guest
2016	Ipaglaban Mo: OFW	Precy
2016	Langit Lupa	Gigi
2017	Ipaglaban Mo: Abuso	Elsa
2017	Bet on Your Baby	Herself/Guest
2017	Mars	Herself/Guest
2018	Ipaglaban Mo: Haciendero	Chona
2018	The Lolas' Beautiful Show	Herself/Guest
2018	Eat Bulaga!	Herself/Guest
2018	Sana Dalawa ang Puso	Libereta "Leb" Manatad
2019	Ipaglaban Mo: Depresyon	Charmaine
2019	Maalaala Mo Kaya: Kumelavoo	JingJing
2019	Ipaglaban Mo: Palaban	Nessy
2020	Happy Time	Herself/Host
2024	Open 24/7	Aunt O
2025	Rainbow Rumble	Herself/Contestant

=== Film ===
Year	Title	Role
2006	Zsazsa Zaturnnah: ZE Moveeh	Nora A.
2007	My Kuya's Wedding	Jopay
2008	Supahpapalicious	Dyosa
2008	My Only Ü	Sheryll
2010	Babe, I Love You	Agnes
2011	No Other Woman	Mimi
2013	Tuhog	Rochelle
2015	Ex with Benefits	Genelyn
2016	The Third Party	Patient
2017	Extra Service	Beverly
2017	Meant to Beh	LV

=== Awards and nominations ===
Year	Award	Category	Result
2006	33rd Metro Manila Film Festival	Best Supporting Actress	Nominated
2016	Aliw Awards	Best Actress in a featured role	Won
2016	Aliw Awards	Best Stand-up Comedian	Nominated
2016	Aliw Awards	Best Crossover Performer	Nominated
2017	Aliw Awards	Best Stand-up Comedian	Nominated
2019	Aliw Awards	Best Stand-up Comedian	Nominated
2020	Gawad Amerika	Most outstanding comedian actress	Won
2020	Gawad Amerika	Best Noontime Show Host	Won
2021	Quezon City Hall and Eastwood Exhibit	Iconic Women of Quezon City	Won
2021	Laguna Excellence Awards	Most Outstanding Female TV Host of the Year	Won
