= Happy Time (TV program) =

Philippine television show

- Genre: Game show Variety show
- Created by: Rhandy Reyes
- Developed by: Net 25
- Written by: Jake Bacud; Raymond Dimayuga
- Directed by: John Paul Panizales
- Presented by: Anjo Yllana
- Theme music composer: Ian Fajarito
- Country of origin: Philippines
- Original language: Filipino
- No. of episodes: 147 (airs daily)

Production
- Producer: Noah Belmes Tamag
- Editors: Nap Pineda; BJ Karganilla
- Camera setup: Multiple-camera setup
- Running time: 120 minutes (with advertisements)
- Production company: Net 25

Original release
- Network: Net 25
- Release: September 14, 2020 – October 15, 2021

Happy Time is a Philippine television variety show broadcast by Net 25. Originally hosted by Anjo Yllana, Janno Gibbs and Kitkat, it aired from September 14, 2020 to October 15, 2021, replacing Agila Balita and was replaced by Ano Sa Palagay N'yo?. Boobsie Wonderland, CJ Hirro and Dingdong Avanzado serve as the final hosts.

== Hosts ==
=== Final hosts ===
- Boobsie Wonderland (2021)
- CJ Hirro (2021)
- Dingdong Avanzado (2021)

==== Segment hosts ====
- Aikee (2020–21)
- Nelvin Pascua a.k.a. Alvin Chorizo (2020–21)

==== Guest hosts ====
- Mico Aytona (2021)

=== Former hosts ===
- Anjo Yllana (2020–21)
- Janno Gibbs (2020–21)
- Kitkat (2020–21)

== Segments ==
=== Final segments ===
- Bawal Peyk News
- Kanta-nungan
- Mask-Sunurin of the Day
- PM is the Key
- Sana All
- Sing Song with Dingdong

=== Former segments ===
- Ayuda Juan
- Hanger Games
- Janno Gives...
- Maalis Taya

== See also ==
- List of Net 25 original programming
