= Anjo Yllana =

Filipino actor, comedian and politician (born 1968)

The Honourable Anjo Yllana

Member of the Quezon City Council from the 5th district
- In office June 30, 2013 – June 30, 2019

6th Vice Mayor of Parañaque
- In office June 30, 2004 – June 30, 2007
- Mayor: Florencio Bernabe Jr.
- Preceded by: Florencio Bernabe Jr.
- Succeeded by: Gustavo Tambunting

Member of the Parañaque City Council from the 2nd district
- In office June 30, 1998 – June 30, 2004

Personal details
- Born: Andres Jose Garchitorena Yllana Jr. April 24, 1968 (age 58) Santa Mesa, Manila, Philippines
- Party: PDP (2025–present)
- Other political affiliations: Nacionalista (2024–2025); Independent (2018–2024); Liberal (2015–2018); PMP (1998–2015)
- Parent(s): Andres Yllana, Sr. (father); Vicky Garchitorena Yllana (mother)
- Relatives: Francis Garchitorena (uncle); Mariano Garchitorena (grandfather)
- Occupation: Actor; host; comedian; politician

Andres Jose Salvador "Anjo" Garchitorena Yllana Jr. (born April 24, 1968) is a Filipino actor-comedian, television host and politician. He was one of the hosts of Eat Bulaga! from 1998 to 2020.

== Career ==
Yllana started in show business in 1984 with talent manager the late Douglas Quijano. He then auditioned for the teen TV variety show That's Entertainment after attempting a career as a professional basketball player. He started with support roles in both comedy and drama. He was nominated by different award-giving bodies as Best Supporting Actor in the movie Itanong Mo sa Buwan, starring opposite Jaclyn Jose and directed by Chito S. Roño.

His turning point in show business came in 1991, when he was given the role of Dino Tengco, the mentally disabled son of the crazy politician couple Barbara and Anding Tengco in the ABS-CBN satirical sitcom Abangan Ang Susunod Na Kabanata. He was awarded Best Comedy Actor by Star Awards in 1992 for his efforts. He was subsequently launched as a solo comedian and had several successful comedy films to his name, among them Dino, Abangan ang Susunod Na... (his launching movie), Pempe ni Sara at Pen (with Kris Aquino and Vandolph) and Milyonaryong Mini (with John Estrada and Sheryl Cruz). He also became part of the sitcoms Ober da Bakod (GMA Network) and Palibhasa Lalake (ABS-CBN). His stint in the latter sitcom cost him his role in Ober da Bakod after he decided to become an exclusive ABS-CBN talent.

After Abangan Ang Susunod Na Kabanata ended its run, Anjo turned to TV directing via the GMA Network sitcom M.U.? which starred his brother Jomari Yllana as well as Gelli de Belen. Soon after, in 1999, he moved to GMA Network after ending his contract with ABS-CBN and started hosting the long-running noontime show Eat Bulaga!. His former comic tandem with Janno Gibbs in Ober da Bakod was revived via Beh Bote Nga (1999-2003) and Nuts Entertainment (2003-2007). They also appeared together in Eat Bulaga! until Janno resigned from the show to start acting in GMA soap operas. His last solo TV show was Cool Center where he formed a hilarious tandem with Eugene Domingo from 2008 to 2009.

In 2020, he finally resigned from Eat Bulaga! after 21 years due to the COVID-19 pandemic. With no other shows on GMA, Yllana accepted Net 25's offer as the lead host of the network's first noontime comedy variety program, Happy Time along with other co-hosts that are also formerly from Eat Bulaga! - Kitkat and Janno Gibbs. The show also served as the reunion of Anjo & Janno tandem since Ober Da Bakod, Beh Bote Nga, Nuts Entertainment and Eat Bulaga!. As of 2021, he was cancelled/terminated from the show due to another bullying incident with the new hosts.

In June 2026, the Regional Trial Court of Mandaluyong ruled in favor of TVJ Productions in a defamation case against Yllana over statements he made on social media in 2025, ordering him to pay ₱3.5 million in damages. Yllana later apologized to the trio (Tito Sotto, Vic Sotto, and Joey de Leon) but described the damages as “very harsh” and indicated plans to appeal the decision.

=== Political career ===
Yllana started ventured into politics in 1998 when he ran and won as city councilor of the 2nd district of Parañaque. He was reelected in 2001 and served for a total of two terms before seeking higher office. In 2004, he was elected vice mayor of the same city. In 2007, he lost in his bid for reelection to councilor Gustavo Tambunting. In 2010, he ran once again for vice mayor under the banner of Pwersa ng Masang Pilipino and as the running mate of 1st District Representative Eduardo Zialcita, but lost to Tambunting once again.

In 2013, he ran for city councilor, this time in the newly created 5th district of Quezon City, which includes his home barangay Fairview. He was re-elected in 2016 and served until 2019.

Yllana then transferred to Tinambac, Camarines Sur, and on October 4, 2021, he filed his certificate of candidacy to run for representative of the province's 4th district in 2022. However, he withdrew from the race in November 2021, citing his health following his diagnosis with COVID-19 and financial issues. He was reportedly substituted by comedian and former San Jose Mayor Tony Chavez, who would then go on to lose the race to incumbent Arnie Fuentebella.

In 2025, Yllana ran for vice mayor of Calamba, Laguna, as the running mate of former Mayor Timmy Chipeco, who was seeking a comeback. However, they both lost, with Yllana losing to incumbent Vice Mayor Angelito Lazaro Jr.

== Organizations ==
- Member of Scouts Royale Brotherhood (SRB)

== Filmography ==
=== Film ===
- Super Islaw and the Flying Kids (1986)
- Once Upon a Time (1987) - Benny
- Tagos ng Dugo (1987)
- Kapag Napagod ang Puso (1988)
- Rosenda (1989)
- Isang Araw Walang Diyos (1989)
- Regal Shocker: The Movie ("Pangako" segment) (1989)
- Flavor of the Month (1990)
- Shake, Rattle & Roll II ("Aswang" segment) (1990)
- Joey Boy Munti: 15 Anyos Ka sa Muntinglupa (1991) - Boyong
- Da Young Asiong Aksaya (1991)
- Pitong Gamol (1991)
- Pretty Boy (1992)
- Mahal, Saan Ka Natulog Kagabi? (1992)
- Estribo Gang: The Jinggoy Sese Story (1992)
- Dobol Dribol (1992)
- Alabang Girls (1992)
- Mahirap Maging Pogi (1992)
- Guwapings: The First Adventure (1992) - Buddy
- Mamas Boys: Mga Praning-ning (1993)
- Gagay: Prinsesa ng Brownout (1993) - Paul
- Dino, Abangan ang Susunod Na... (1993) - Dino
- Pulis Patola (1993)
- Sobra Talaga... Over! (1994)
- Ober Da Bakod: The Movie (1994)
- Chick Boy (1994) - Raffy
- Si Ayala at si Zobel (1995) - Ayala
- Pulis Patola 2 (1995) - Matipid/Kuya Lotpu
- Best Friends (1995)
- Siyempre Ikaw Lang...: Ang Syota Kong Imported (1996)
- Ober Da Bakod 2: Da Treasure Adbentyur (1996)
- Milyonaryong Mini (1996)
- Isa, Dalawa, Takbo! (1996) - Esting
- Hari ng Yabang (1997) Vic
- Enteng Kabisote: OK Ka Fairy Ko... The Legend (2004) - Pandoy
- Pak! Pak! My Dr. Kwak! (2011)
- My Little Bossings (2013)
- Separados (2014)
- My Bebe Love: #KiligPaMore (2015)
- Will You Marry (2021)
- Hello Universe (2023)
- My Zombabe (2024)
- Itutumba Ka Ng Tatay Ko (2024)

=== Television ===
- Lovingly Yours Helen (1987–1996)
- Kalatog Pinggan (1987–1989)
- Ang Tabi Kong Mamaw (1988-1989)
- Maricel Regal Drama Special (1987)
- Young Love, Sweet Love (1989–1993)
- Takeshi's Castle (1991–1992)
- B Na B: Baliw Na Baliw Game Show (1992–1993)
- Alabang Girls The Comedy Series (1992–1994)
- Tondominium (1994–1995)
- Maalaala Mo Kaya: Payaso (1992)
- Abangan Ang Susunod Na Kabanata (1991–1997)
- Palibhasa Lalake (1990, 1993–1998)
- Ober Da Bakod (1992–1997)
- Eat Bulaga! (1998–2020)
- Beh Bote Nga (1999–2003)
- Magpakailanman: The Efren "Bata" Reyes Story (2004)
- Nuts Entertainment (2004–2009)
- Maynila (2005–2020)
- Cool Center (2009–2010)
- Talentadong Pinoy (2010)
- Swerte Swerte Lang (2011)
- Pidol's Wonderland (2012)
- Toda Max (2013) - guest as "Dino Tengco"
- Gandang Gabi, Vice! (2013) - guest with the cast of Palibhasa Lalake Reunion
- Vampire ang Daddy Ko (2013–2016)
- Pangalawang Bukas: 2014 Eat Bulaga Holy Week Drama Specials (April 16, 2014)
- Pangako ng Pag-ibig: 2015 Eat Bulaga Lenten Special (March 30, 2015)
- Sabado Badoo (2015) - cameo footage featured
- Dear Uge (2016)
- Hay, Bahay! (2017)
- Full House Tonight (2017)
- Celebrity Bluff (2018)
- Daddy's Gurl (2018)
- The Boobay and Tekla Show (2019)
- Mars Pa More (2019)
- Ilaban Natin Yan! (2020)
- Chika Besh (2020)
- Happy Time (2020–2021)
- Rolling In It Philippines (2021)
- John En Ellen (2022)
- Team A: Happy Fam, Happy Life (2023–2024)
- FPJ's Batang Quiapo (2024)
- Regal Studio Presents (2025)
- Barangay Love Stories (2026)

== Awards ==
- Winner, Best Comedy Actor - 1992 PMPC Star Awards For TV
