= Aleck Bovick =

Filipino actress

- Born: Maria Teresa Bovick Tambis
- Occupation: Actress
- Years active: 1999–present
- Height: 1.68 m (5 ft 6 in)

Maria Teresa Bovick Tambis, better known by her screen name Aleck Bovick, is a Filipino actress and former rapper.

== Personal life ==
Her father was Filipino and her mother was half-German. She was in a relationship with Filipino actor Carlo Maceda from 2005 to 2008.

== Career ==
- Bovick's home network is GMA Network, but she also does projects on TV5 and ABS-CBN
- Bovick started her career in 1999 when she starred Beh Bote Nga.
- In 2002, Bovick starred in Habang Kapiling Ka as Liway, a sexy woman who was hired to spy on Olivia's family and who will fall in love with Jonas (Zoren Legaspi).
- Two years later in 2004, she reappeared on television starring in Maid in Heaven and Panday.
- She then went to guest in Pinoy Big Brother: Celebrity Edition.
- Then in 2009, she returned to GMA Network to star in Daisy Siete (Tarzariray: Amazonang Kikay).
- Bovick then guested on TV5 when she appeared on Star Confessions.
- In 2014, Bovick returned to ABS-CBN and she had a recurring role in the long-running family television series, Be Careful With My Heart as Lucinda Quijano, Joni's mother (Shy Carlos).
- In early 2015, she starred in the afternoon TV series Nasaan Ka Nang Kailangan Kita as Ching Galvez who is Cecilia's best friend (Vina Morales) and Joel's mother (Joshua Garcia).
- In 2018, she also appeared in the afternoon TV series Kadenang Ginto as Myrna Bartolome who is Kulas's ex-husband (Ronnie Lazaro), Mother of three sons, including Carlos (Adrian Alandy).
- In 2021, Bovick starred in the primetime television series Init sa Magdamag as Celia Macatangay, who is Rita's mother (Yam Concepcion).
- In 2022, Bovick returned to GMA Network to join the cast the romantic drama television series What We Could Be as Melba Macaraeg who is Cynthia's mother (Ysabel Ortega).
- In 2023, she played the antagonist role in the action primetime television series Black Rider as Lorna Santos-Dimaculangan who is Pretty's evil sister-in-law and rival (Herlene Budol).
- In 2025, she played a supporting role in the primetime television series "Batang Quiapo" as Linda Sanchez and stepmom (Maris Racal).

== Filmography ==
=== Film ===
| Year | Title | Role |
|---|---|---|
| 2002 | Kaulayaw | |
| 2002 | Tampisaw | Marites |
| 2002 | Masarap na Pugad | Koala |
| 2003 | Hiram | Mila |
| 2004 | U-Belt | Sarah |
| 2004 | Naglalayag | Rica |
| 2008 | Sisa | Doña Consolation |
| 2009 | Manila | Cherie |
| 2013 | Talamak | |
| 2014 | Bigkis | |
| 2015 | Bahay ampunan | |
| 2019 | Cuddle Weather | Nida |

=== Television ===
| Year | Title | Role |
|---|---|---|
| 1999 | Beh Bote Nga | |
| 2002 | Sana ay Ikaw na Nga | Yvonne |
| 2004 | Maid in Heaven | Delia |
| 2005 | Carlo J. Caparas' Ang Panday | Lady Feirrus |
| 2006 | Pinoy Big Brother: Celebrity Edition 1 | Guest |
| 2006 | Komiks | |
| 2009 | Tarzariray: Amazonang Kikay | Olive / Nana |
| 2011 | Star Confessions | Roda |
| 2013–14 | Be Careful With My Heart | Lucinda Quijano |
| 2015 | Ricky Lee's Nasaan Ka Nang Kailangan Kita | Chynna "Ching" Galvez |
| 2016 | Maalaala Mo Kaya: "Toga" | Luzminda |
| 2016 | The Greatest Love | Aling Thelma Alcantara |
| 2016 | Maalaala Mo Kaya: "50 Peso" | Marivic |
| 2016–17 | FPJ's Ang Probinsyano | Cora Ignacio |
| 2017 | Dear Uge | |
| 2017 | Maalaala Mo Kaya: "Lason" | Beth |
| 2018–19 | Kadenang Ginto | Myrna Bartolome |
| 2019 | Ipaglaban Mo!: "Sisante" | Perla Suarez |
| 2021 | Init sa Magdamag | Celia Macatangay |
| 2022 | Flower of Evil | Josie Medina |
| 2022 | What We Could Be | Melba Macaraeg |
| 2023 | Wish Ko Lang (Episode: Hipag Wars) | |
| 2023 | Black Rider | Lorna Santos-Dimaculangan |
| 2025 | FPJ's Batang Quiapo | Linda Sanchez |
| 2025 | Beauty Empire | Florinda De Jesus (Shari’s Mother) |
| 2026 | Tadhana | Gloria Jimenez |
| 2026 | Sigabo | Ibyang Mendez |

== Discography ==
=== Singles ===
- "Baso ni Maria"
- "Gatas" (also known as "Gatas ni Papa")
- "Gusto Ko Ang Nota" (also simply known as "Nota")
- "Prinsesa"
- "Sapatos Ni Sion"
- "Astig Ang Syota Ko"
- "Sakyan Mo Ako"
- "Ayoko Ng Bitin"
