= Maid in Heaven =

2004 Philippine television drama series

- Genre: Comedy drama
- Starring: Cherry Pie Picache; Mickey Ferriols; Manilyn Reynes; Pokwang; Katrina Gonzales; Kristine Gonzales; Aleck Bovick; Assunta de Rossi
- Country of origin: Philippines
- Original language: Tagalog
- No. of episodes: 70

Production
- Running time: 30 minutes

Original release
- Network: ABS-CBN
- Release: August 16 – November 19, 2004

Maid in Heaven is a Philippine television drama comedy series broadcast by ABS-CBN. Starring Cherry Pie Picache, Mickey Ferriols, Manilyn Reynes, Pokwang, Katrina Gonzales, Kristine Gonzales, Aleck Bovick and Assunta de Rossi. It aired on the network's afternoon line up from August 16 to November 19, 2004, replacing Solita Mi Amor was replaced by Showbiz No. 1.

== Cast ==
- Cherry Pie Picache as Encar
- Mickey Ferriols as Amy
- Manilyn Reynes as Filomena
- Pokwang as Harlene
- Katrina Gonzales as Betty
- Kristine Gonzales as Boo
- Aleck Bovick as Delia
- Assunta De Rossi as Sharon
- Trina Legazpi as Gwendolyn
