= Beh Bote Nga =

Philippine television sitcom series

- Title card
- Genre: Sitcom
- Written by: Wystan Dimalanta
- Directed by: Uro Q. dela Cruz
- Starring: Janno Gibbs; Anjo Yllana
- Theme music composer: Rene Garcia; Dennis Garcia
- Opening theme: "Beh Buti Nga" by Janno Gibbs and Anjo Yllana
- Country of origin: Philippines
- Original language: Tagalog

Production
- Executive producer: Jaydine Valencia
- Camera setup: Multiple-camera setup
- Running time: 26–60 minutes
- Production company: GMA Entertainment TV

Original release
- Network: GMA Network
- Release: March 9, 1999 – April 16, 2003

Beh Bote Nga is a Philippine television sitcom series broadcast by GMA Network. Starring Janno Gibbs and Anjo Yllana, it premiered on March 9, 1999 on the network's KiliTV line up. The series concluded on April 16, 2003.

The series is streaming online on YouTube.

== Cast and characters ==
Cast

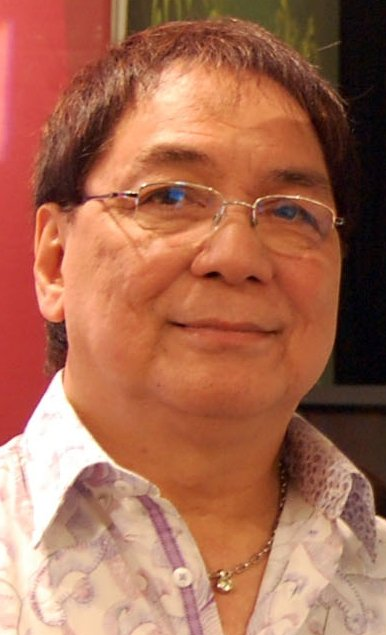
Joey de Leon

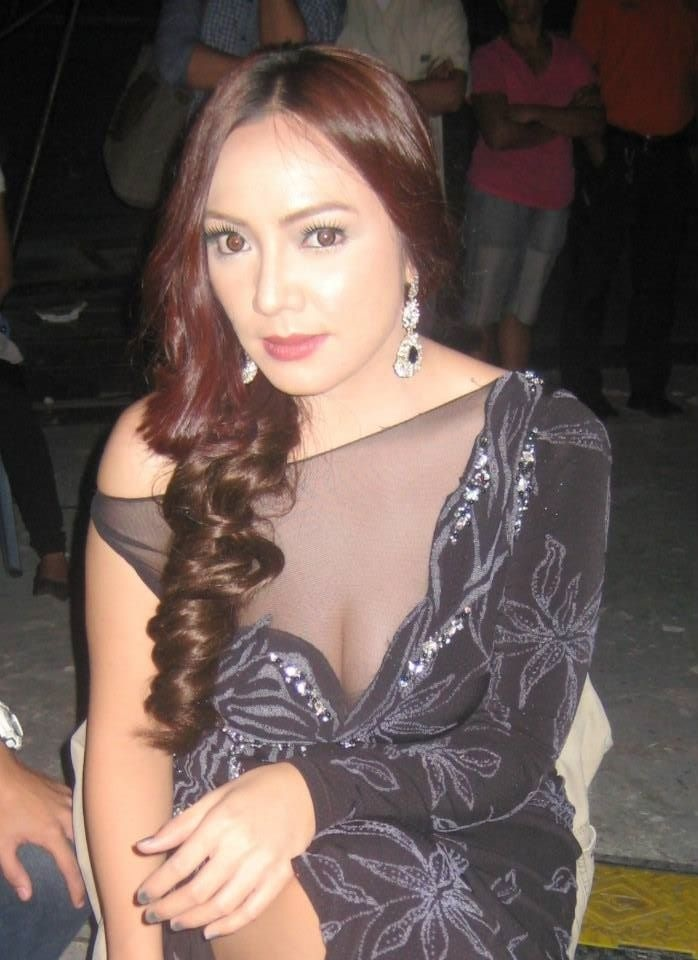
Shermaine Santiago

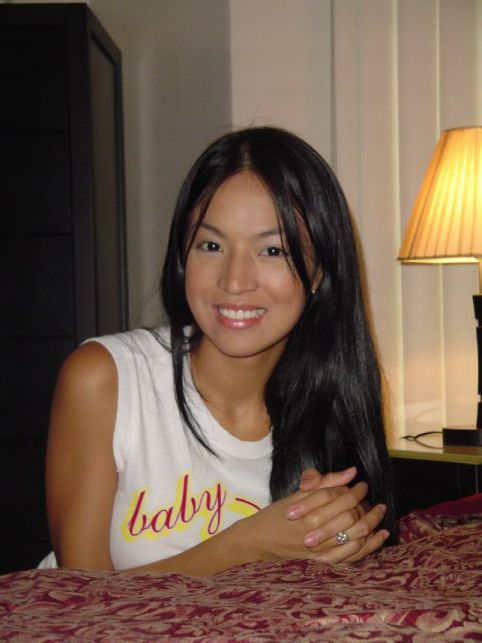
Aubrey Miles

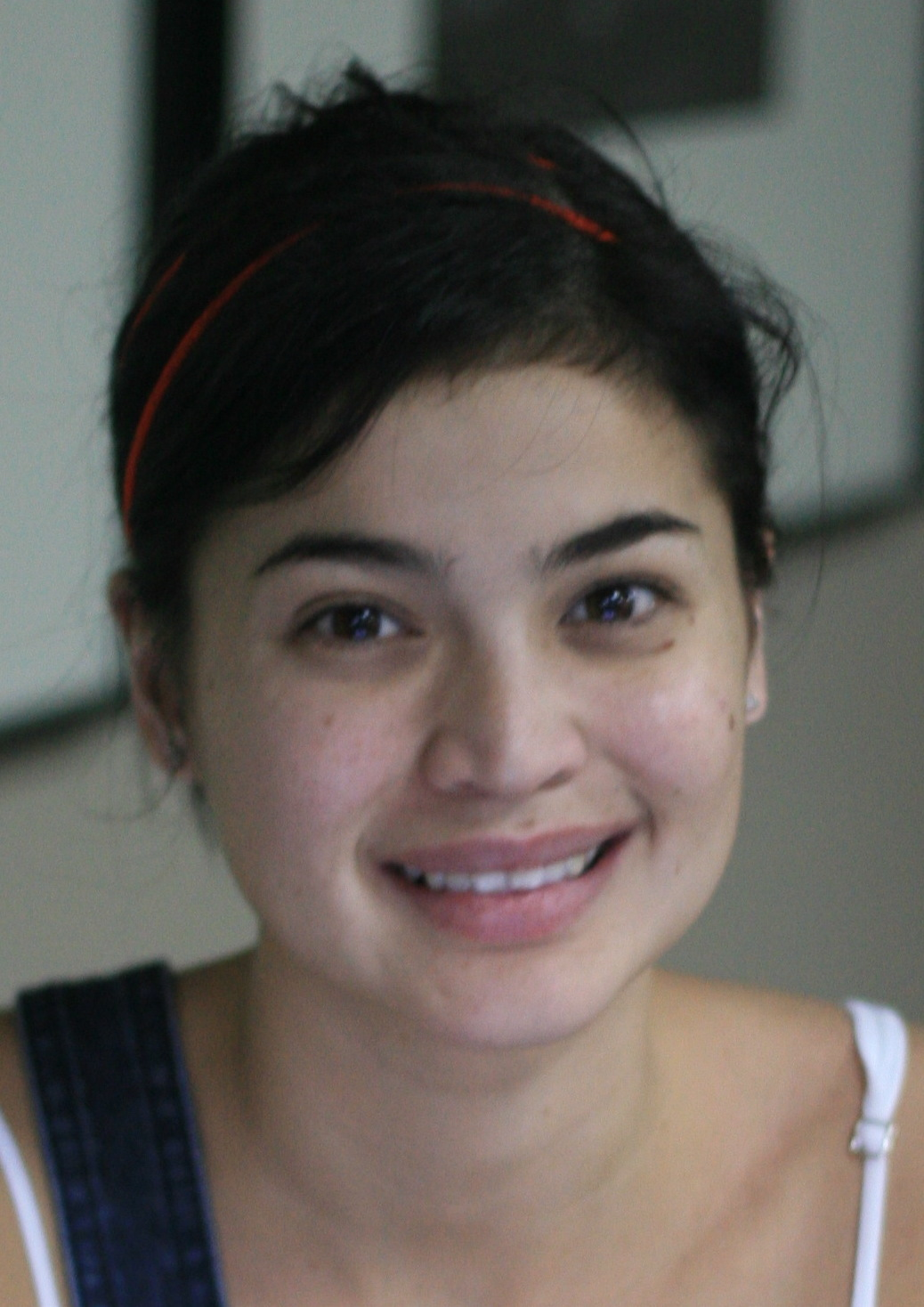
Anne Curtis

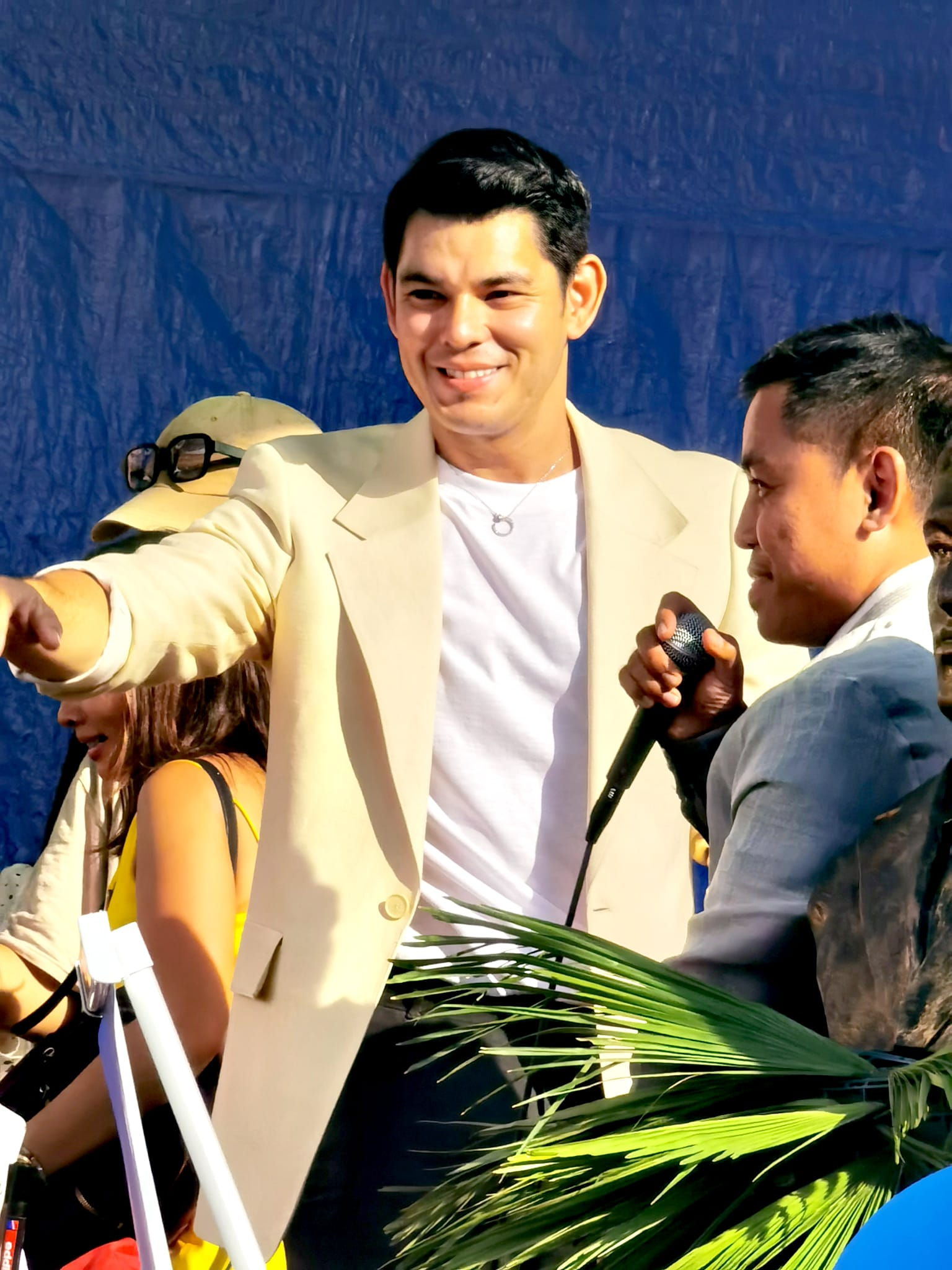
Richard Gutierrez

Lead cast

- Janno Gibbs as Kot Indaak
- Anjo Yllana as Tot Indaak
- Giselle Toengi as G
- Steven Claude Goyong as Goyong

Supporting cast

- Joey de Leon as Tio Pot Indaak
- Shermaine Santiago as Celine
- Aubrey Miles as Dion
- Dick Israel as Max
- Tiya Pusit as Tweety
- Jake Roxas as Tom
- KC Montero as Jerry
- Tom Taus Jr. as Newton
- Rod Navarro as Facundo
- Diego Llorico
- Pepe Smith
- Kim Kyung-Ok
- Jojo Bolado
- Mach Duran
- Rey Aranas
- Danilo Barrios
- VP Hernandez
- Bella Flores as Bella
- Ina Raymundo as Tina
- Ana Roces as Maan
- Gladys Guevarra
- Anne Curtis as Fer
- Richard Gutierrez as Peter
- Sherwin Ordoñez as Parker

== Accolades ==
Accolades received by Beh Bote Nga
Year	Award	Category	Recipient	Result	Ref.
1999	13th PMPC Star Awards for Television	Best Comedy Show	Beh Bote Nga	Won	
