= Louise Abuel =

Filipino actor and model (born 2003)

- Born: Louise Darnell Alba Abuel; December 27, 2003 (age 22); Manila, Philippines
- Occupations: Actor, model
- Years active: 2011–present
- Agent: Star Magic (2011–present)

Louise Darnell Alba Abuel (born December 27, 2003) is a Filipino actor and commercial model. He started as a child actor, appearing in notable television series such as 100 Days to Heaven (2011) and Princess and I (2012–2013).

Abuel is currently under contract with ABS-CBN. He has received several nominations for his work, including for the Luna Award and Gawad Urian Awards, and won Best Actor at the Dhaka International Film Festival for his role in Edward (2019).

== Career ==
In 2020, he won the Best Actor award in the Asian Film category of the 18th Dhaka International Film Festival for his titular role in Edward.

== Filmography ==
=== Film ===
Year	Title	Role	Notes	Ref.
2012	Born to Love You	Bryan	Support Role	
2012	The Reunion	Miggy		
2019	Edward	Edward	Main Role; Entry for the 15th Cinemalaya Independent Film Festival	
2025	City’s Laundry and Taxes	Miko	Entry for the SineKabataan Film Lab and Festival	
2025	Kontrabida Academy	Travis		

=== Television ===
Year	Title	Role	Notes	Ref.
2011	Happy Yipee Yehey!	Himself		
2011	ASAP Rocks	Himself		
2011	100 Days to Heaven	Kevin Delgado		
2011	The Buzz	Himself		
2011	Kris TV	Himself		
2011–2012	Ikaw ay Pag-Ibig	Edison		
2012	Wansapanataym: Maya Aksaya	Loki	Season 1, Episode 74; credited as "Louis Abuel"	
2012	Princess and I	Young Jao		
2012	Wansapanataym: Si Pam Pabaya at ang Mahiwagang Gold Fish	Goldy	Season 1, Episode 81; voice role	
2012–2013	Aryana	Miko Salvador		
2013	Wansapanataym: Tago, Diego, Tago	Diego	Season 1, Episode 135	
2013	Wansapanataym: Give Gloves on Christmas Day	Mac-Mac	Season 1, Episode 161	
2013	Juan dela Cruz	Pikoy		
2014	Ikaw Lamang	Young Franco Hidalgo		
2014	Maalaala Mo Kaya: Sanggol	Benjie	Episode 1010	
2014	Maalaala Mo Kaya: Lipstick	Young Andres	Episode 1011	
2014	The Legal Wife	Bunjoy De Villa		
2014	Wansapanataym: Nato de Coco	Nato Palmera	Season 1, Episodes 193–199	
2014	Maalaala Mo Kaya: Palayan	Young Igge	Episode 1029	
2014	Maalaala Mo Kaya: Birth Certificate	Joshua	Episode 1031	
2014	Give Love on Christmas: The Gift Giver	Makoy		
2015	Pasión de Amor	Young Juan		
2015	Walang Iwanan	Jose		
2016	Magpahanggang Wakas	Young King Del Mar	Episodes 1–3	
2016	Maalaala Mo Kaya: Alkansya	Jen-Jen	Episode 1103	
2016	Ipaglaban Mo!: Selos	Caloy	Episode 94	
2016	Maalaala Mo Kaya: Kweba	Jayson	Episode 1113	
2016	Maalaala Mo Kaya: Salamin	Young Josef	Episode 1128	
2016	Maalaala Mo Kaya: Luneta Park	Dongdong	Episode 1139	
2017	Maalaala Mo Kaya: Salon	Lester	Episode 1158	
2017	Maalaala Mo Kaya: Mesa	Young Lan	Episode 1166	
2017	Maalaala Mo Kaya: Baso	Teen Jayson	Episode 1177	
2017	Maalaala Mo Kaya: Gitara	Gospel	Episode 1184	
2018	Maalaala Mo Kaya: Medalya	Teen Ahwel	Episode 1195	
2018	Maalaala Mo Kaya: Barya	Young Ely	Episode 1200	
2018	Maalaala Mo Kaya: Cards	Joshua	Episode 1214	
2018	Halik	Young Lino	Guest Role	
2018	Playhouse	Young Marlon	Guest Role	
2018	Ipaglaban Mo!	Kristina's Son	Season 1, Episode 180 and 213	
2019	The General's Daughter	Young Franco		
2019	Maalaala Mo Kaya: Pregnancy Test	Young Mitch	Episode 1240	
2019	Ipaglaban Mo: Samantala	Paolo	Season 1, Episode 248	
2019	Kadenang Ginto	Paco Herrera	Support Role	
2019–2020	Story of My Life	Xavier	Support Role	
2020	Maalaala Mo Kaya: Kawayan	Darius	Episode 1288	
2020–2021	Oh My Dad!	Theo Balderama	Support Role	
2021	Click, Like, Share: Barter	Carlo		
2021	ASAP Natin 'To	Himself / Performer		
2021–2022	Viral Scandal	Nico Sicat	Support Role	
2022	A Family Affair	Young Paco		
2022	Maalaala Mo Kaya: Passport	Abdalla	Episode 1342	
2022	One Good Day	Lucky	Mini-series	
2022–2023	The Iron Heart	Troy Adelantar	Support Role	
2024	Lavender Fields	Carlo Fernandez	Recurring Role	
2025	Incognito	Francisco "Jun/Kiko" Malvar / Diego "Uno" Aguinaldo	Support Role	
2025	It's Okay to Not Be Okay	Kai	Support Role	
2025	Rainbow Rumble	Himself		

== Accolades ==
Awards and NominationsAwards and nominations received by Louise Abuel
Award	Year	Category	Nominated work	Result	Ref.
Ani ng Dangal	2021	Cinema	—N/a	Honored	
Dhaka International Film Festival	2020	Best Actor	Edward	Won	
Gawad Urian Award	2020	Best Actor	Edward	Nominated	
Luna Awards	2020	Best Actor	Edward	Nominated	
PMPC Star Awards for Movies	2021	Movie Actor of the Year	Edward	Nominated	
PMPC Star Awards for Movies	2021	New Movie Actor of the Year	Edward	Nominated	
PMPC Star Awards for Television	2012	Best Child Performer	100 Days To Heaven	Nominated	
PMPC Star Awards for Television	2013	Best Child Performer	Juan dela Cruz	Nominated	
Young Critics Circle Awards	2020	Best Performance	Edward	Nominated	
