= Mickey Ferriols =

Filipino actress

- Born: Michelle Forster; March 8, 1973 (age 53); Chicago, Illinois, U.S.
- Education: Assumption College San Lorenzo
- Occupations: actress; TV host
- Years active: 1995–present
- Agents: Star Magic (2003–13); Viva Artist Agency (2021-present)
- Partner: Archie Alemania (2005–09)
- Children: 1
- Relatives: Andre Paras (nephew); Kobe Paras (nephew); Jackie Foster (half-sister)

Michelle Forster (born March 8, 1973), also known as Mickey Ferriols, is a Filipino actress.

She has a son with ex-partner Archie Alemania named Brent Marcus Alemania.

== Career ==
Ferriols shot into stardom via a PLDT commercial. She has since starred in memorable teleseryes like Sana Maulit Muli, Hiram, Dyosa, Ina Kapatid Anak and Kadenang Ginto, among all. She also appeared in several movie blockbusters such as Honey, Nasa Langit Na Ba Ako? (1998), Jose Rizal (1998), Kung Ako Na Lang Sana (2003), Caregiver (2008), and Born to Love You (2012); all of which she worked with high-caliber actors with the likes of Cesar Montano and Sharon Cuneta.

For some time, Ferriols hosted award-winning shows such as Eat Bulaga and Unang Hirit.

== Filmography ==
=== Film ===
Year	Title	Role
1998	Warfreak: Walang Sinasanto, Walang Pinapatawad	Liza
1998	Jose Rizal	Leonor Rivera–Kipping
1998	Honey, Nasa Langit Na Ba Ako?	Lisa
1999	Sabado Ng Gabi, Linggo Ng Umaga	Alyssa
2003	Kung Ako na Lang Sana	Elaine
2004	Volta	MTB Host
2008	Caregiver	Julia
2010	I'll Be There	Teresa
2011	Way Back Home	Bettina
2012	Born to Love You	Bianca

=== Television ===
Year	Title	Role
1995	Business and Leisures	Leisure Co-Host
1995	Good Evening Pls	Host
1996–2000	Eat Bulaga!	Host
1997–98	Ogag	Herself
1997–99	Hope Hollywood Treasures	Movie Jock
1999–2001	Unang Hirit	Host
2000	1 for 3	Jamie
2003	Masayang Tanghali Bayan	Host
2004	Hiram	Beatrice Duenas
2004	Maid in Heaven	Amy
2004–05	MTB: Ang Saya Saya	Host
2006	Ano Bang Hanap Mo?	Host
2006	Komiks Presents: Sandok ni Boninay	Ethel
2007	Sana Maulit Muli	Emily Sta. Maria
2007	Ysabella	TV Host
2007	Kwentong Disyerto	Host
2008	Kung Fu Kids	Melissa "Lisa" De Vela
2008–09	Dyosa	Aning / Siniang / Connie / Mariang Sinukuan
2009	Your Song Presents: Underage	Cita Serrano
2009	May Bukas Pa	Vicky Montalban
2010	Magkano ang Iyong Dangal?	Rodora
2010	Habang May Buhay	Dra. Jaramilla Agustin
2010	Rosalka	Cecille Dimaano
2010	Kokey @ Ako	Annie Reyes
2010	Showtime	Judge 3 weeks
2011	Nasaan Ka, Elisa?	Viviana "Vivian" Altamira-Rincon
2011	Wansapanataym: Unli-Gift Box	Rosanna De Jesus
2012	Wansapanataym: Ilog	Bessie
2012	Kahit Puso'y Masugatan	Grace Canlas-De Guzman
2012	Ina, Kapatid, Anak	Lourdes "Lulu" Castillo
2013	Little Champ	Xiu Liang
2013	Maalaala Mo Kaya: Altar	Belen
2013	Wansapanataym: Copy Kat	Joan
2013	Maalaala Mo Kaya: Cake	Siony
2014	Kambal Sirena	Marissa Natividad
2014	Ipaglaban Mo: Hustisya Para Sa'yo, Anak	Charie
2015	Healing Hearts	Rachel Saavedra
2015	Because of You	Mildred Samaniego
2015	Pangako Sa 'Yo	Monay
2016	Juan Happy Love Story	Jenna Dela Costa
2016	Doble Kara	Cynthia Manrique
2016	Usapang Real Love: Perfect Fit	Amanda Lace
2017	Wish Ko Lang: Padyak	Marissa
2017	Tadhana	Madam Calixta
2017	FPJ's Ang Probinsyano	Catherine "Cathy" De Silva
2017	My Korean Jagiya	Carmela "Mel" De Villa
2018	My Guitar Princess	Mariah
2018	Kadenang Ginto	Camilla Mondragon
2018	Imbestigador: Mag-Asawa	Liesyl Bordadora
2019	Ipaglaban Mo: Sabik	Lisa
2019	The Killer Bride	Amalia Gonzales
2019	Ipaglaban Mo: Malasakit	Karla
2019	Taiwan That You Love	Roselle Libarios
2019	Maalaala Mo Kaya: Contest	Richelle
2020	A Soldier's Heart	Minda Marasigan
2021	Init sa Magdamag	Claire Alarcon
2021	Di Na Muli	Lucy Nicolas
2022	2 Good 2 Be True	Sophia "Hanna" Agcaoili / Miriam Santos-Borja
2022	Run to Me	Emerald
2023	Minsan pa Nating Hagkan ang Nakaraan	Tessa Bautista
2025	Maalaala Mo Kaya: TBA	Flor
2025	Sins of the Father	Amelia Rivera
