= Lance Lucido =

Filipino child actor

- Born: Lance Angelo Lucido; February 27, 2007 (age 19); Iloilo City, Philippines
- Other name: Lance Angelo Lucido
- Occupations: Child actor, dancer
- Years active: 2012–present
- Agent: Star Magic (2012–present)
- Television: ABS-CBN; ALLTV2; GMA Network; TV5 Network
- Height: 5 ft 5 in (165.1 cm)

Lance Angelo Lucido, better known as Lance Lucido (born February 27, 2007), is a Filipino former child actor, teen actor and dancer.

In the 2026 ABS-CBN action-drama series Blood vs Duty, plays the guest role of Gabriel "Gab" Santerva, a troubled young student who becomes the center of a high-stakes crisis.

== Early life and background ==
Lance Lucido was born on February 27, 2007, in Iloilo City, Philippines. In 2010, Lucido left Iloilo for Manila with a new designation as the liaison of the Police Regional Office 6 SPO2 Flor Lucido In Camp Crame. His mother's transfer gave Lance Angelo the opportunity to attend talent workshops at Mamus Talent House, and join auditions. A year after their transfer to Taguig, Metro Manila, he had his first television appearance.

== Career ==
He has been a part of several TV shows, such as Alice Bungisngis and her Wonder Walis, Goin' Bulilit, Wansapanataym, Juan dela Cruz, Apoy Sa Dagat, and Kahit Konting Pagtingin. He also appeared in various TV commercials, and endorsers such as the Joy (powered with Safeguard), Mister Donut, Pizza Hut, Eden Cheese commercial, Red Ribbon, Cynos Inside Haircare, Sun Life Financial, Beryls Chocolate (Malaysia Only), Betadine Antiseptic, Cignal Digital TV, and Boardwalk (Direct Selling Brand).

== Basketball career ==
He represents National University as part of the NU Bulldogs basketball program. In Star Magic All-Star Games 2026 suited up for the Red Team in the Mixed Junior Basketball Division at the SM Mall of Asia Arena, finishing as the 1st Runner Up.

== Filmography ==
Key
| † | Denotes productions that have not yet been released |

=== Film ===
| Year | Title | Role | Ref. |
|---|---|---|---|
| 2014 | Sulyap (Short Film) | Caloy | |
| 2016 | This Time | Emmanuel | |
| 2016 | Ringgo The Dog Shooter | Young Ringgo | |
| 2016 | Ecclesiastes | Young Rex | |
| 2017 | Bloody Crayons | Young Kiko | |
| 2025 | Beyond the Call of Duty | | |

=== Television ===
| Year | Title | Role | Ref. |
|---|---|---|---|
| 2012 | Alice Bungisngis and her Wonder Walis | Ivan | |
| 2013 | Kahit Konting Pagtingin | Peter Ledesma | |
| 2013 | Maalaala Mo Kaya: Pasa | Matthew | |
| 2013 | Wansapanataym: Mommynappers | Tyrone | |
| 2013 | Apoy Sa Dagat | Young Liam / Orwell | |
| 2013 | Juan dela Cruz | Young Asiong | |
| 2013 | Wansapanataym: Simbang Gabi | Young Caloy | |
| 2013–2014 | Goin' Bulilit | Himself | |
| 2014 | Maalaala Mo Kaya: Longboard | Young Dandoy | |
| 2014 | Jim Fernandez's Galema, Anak Ni Zuma | Ethan | |
| 2014 | Maalaala Mo Kaya: Arroz Caldo | Young Mario | |
| 2015 | Nasaan Ka Nang Kailangan Kita | Young Carlo | |
| 2015 | Bridges of Love | Young Muloy | |
| 2015 | Nathaniel | Jonas Marasigan | |
| 2015 | FPJ's Ang Probinsyano | Young Ryan Guzman | |
| 2015 | Ningning | Lester | |
| 2016 | Maalaala Mo Kaya: Pasa | Young Jonjon | |
| 2016 | Maalaala Mo Kaya: Anino | Carlo | |
| 2016 | The Greatest Love | Buboy | |
| 2016 | Langit Lupa | Young Joey | |
| 2017 | A Love to Last | Marty | |
| 2017 | Pusong Ligaw | Young Rafa | |
| 2017 | The Promise of Forever | Young Philip | |
| 2018 | Bagani | Young Apo | |
| 2019 | Ipaglaban Mo: Palaban | Jason | |
| 2025 | Lumuhod Ka sa Lupa | Marky | |
| 2025 | Maalaala Mo Kaya | | |
| 2025 | Family Feud | Himself / Contestant | |
| 2026 | Blood vs Duty | Gabriel "Gab" Santerva | |
| 2026–present | ASAP XP | Himself – Performer / co-host | |

== Awards and nominations ==
| Year | Awards | Category | Work | Result | Ref. |
|---|---|---|---|---|---|
| 2017 | 65th FAMAS Awards | Best Child Performer | Ringgo: The Dog Shooter | Won | |
