= List of Doble Kara characters =

Julia Montes as Kara Dela Rosa (left) and Sara Suarez (right)

Doble Kara (transl. Double Faced / English: Double Kara) is a Philippine melodrama television series, directed by Emmanuel Q. Palo, Trina N. Dayrit, and Jojo A. Saguin, which premiered on ABS-CBN's Kapamilya Gold afternoon block and worldwide on The Filipino Channel on August 24, 2015 to February 10, 2017. The series stars Royal Princess of Drama Julia Montes in a dual role, as Kara Dela Rosa and Sara Suarez, together with an ensemble cast consisting of Carmina Villarroel, Mylene Dizon, Ariel Rivera, Allen Dizon, Sam Milby, Alicia Alonzo, Maxene Magalona, Edgar Allan Guzman, and John Lapus.

The story revolves around identical twin sisters, Kara and Sara, who grew up in a happy family in spite of being poor and whose lives will be intertwined because of love, identity, deceit, ambition, and wealth when destiny teasingly compels to separate their lives. In addition, Doble Kara chronicles the relationship between the twin sisters and their daughters, Rebecca Suarez and Hannah Acosta, as they seek to discover the whereabouts and true identity of Kara's long-lost daughter Isabella Acosta.

== Cast and characters ==
=== Main ===
Actor	Character	Seasons					
Actor	Character	1	2	3	4	5	6
Julia Montes	Kara H. Dela Rosa-Acosta and Sara H. Suarez-Ligaya	Main	Main	Main	Main	Main	Main
Carmina Villarroel	Lucille S. Acosta-Dela Rosa	Main	Main	Main	Main		Main
Mylene Dizon	Laura Hipolito-Suarez	Main	Main	Main	Main	Main	Main
Ariel Rivera	Ishmael Suarez	Main	Main	Main	Main		
Sam Milby	Sebastian "Seb" E. Acosta		Main	Main	Main	Main	Main
John Lapus	Pacito "Itoy" Delgado	Supporting	Supporting	Supporting	Supporting	Main	Main
Maxene Magalona	Alexandra "Alex" E. Acosta-Hernandez		Guest	Guest	Guest	Main	Main
Edgar Allan Guzman	Edward C. Ligaya	Supporting	Supporting	Supporting	Supporting	Main	Main
Rayver Cruz	Banjo Manrique				Guest	Main	Main

- Julia Montes as Kara H. Dela Rosa-Acosta and Sara H. Suarez-Ligaya: Kara is the older immaculate twin sister of Sara who excels in fine arts and lives a simple life. Sara is the younger twin sister of Kara who participates in beauty pageants and contests whenever there are profits; however, she struggles in academics, being exuberant between the two.
- Carmina Villarroel as Lucille S. Acosta-Dela Rosa: Kara's adoptive mother, Sara's stepmother, Sebastian and Alex's older half-sister. Barbara and Delfin's only legitimate daughter and Antonio's wife who is suffering from late-onset schizophrenia.
- Mylene Dizon as Laura Hipolito-Suarez: Kara and Sara's biological mother and Ishmael's wife.
- Ariel Rivera as Ishmael Suarez: Kara and Sara's adoptive father and Laura's late husband.
- Sam Milby as Sebastian "Seb" Acosta: Kara's husband and Alex & Lucille’s half-brother. He grew up in a church and has a passion for supporting those in need, eventually leading him to Kara & her family.
- John Lapus as Pacito "Itoy" Delgado: Andy's older brother, Laura and Ishmael's best friend, and the godparent of the twins.
- Maxene Magalona as Alexandra "Alex" Acosta-Hernandez: Sebastian and Lucille's younger half-sister. She later on schemes with Lucille to torment the Suarez family.
- Edgar Allan Guzman as Edward C. Ligaya: Sara's boyfriend & the father of Sara's deceased daughter Rebecca. He harbors feelings for Sara despite his mother’s disapproval of her, supporting her endeavors even if it puts his own life in jeopardy. Edward eventually marries Sara at the end of the series & the couple is expecting another child.
- Rayver Cruz as Banjo Manrique: Cynthia's younger brother, Rebecca's father-figure, Sara's supportive & protective best friend. He has an interest for Sara and is jealous of Edward.

=== Supporting ===
Actor	Character	Seasons					
Actor	Character	1	2	3	4	5	6
Allen Dizon	Antonio Dela Rosa	Supporting	Supporting	Supporting	Supporting		Special guest
Alicia Alonzo	Barbara Salgado-Acosta	Supporting	Supporting	Supporting	Supporting	Supporting	Supporting
Anjo Damiles	Andrew "Andy" Delgado	Supporting	Supporting	Supporting	Supporting	Supporting	Supporting
Gloria Sevilla	Anita	Supporting	Supporting	Supporting	Supporting		
Krystal Mejes	Isabella D. Acosta / Rebecca "Becca" Suarez				Supporting	Supporting	Supporting
Myel De Leon	Hannah D. Acosta				Supporting	Supporting	Supporting
Mickey Ferriols	Cynthia "Mother" Manrique				Recurring	Supporting	Supporting
Patricia Javier	Chloe Cabrera	Recurring	Recurring	Recurring	Recurring	Supporting	
Nash Aguas	Paolo Acosta				Recurring	Supporting	Supporting
Alexa Ilacad	Patricia Hernandez				Recurring	Supporting	Supporting
Polo Ravales	Julio Hernandez				Guest	Supporting	

- Allen Dizon as Antonio Dela Rosa: Lucille's deceased husband and Kara & Sara's biological father.
- Alicia Alonzo as Barbara Salgado-Acosta: Kara and Sara's step-grandmother, Kara's adoptive grandmother, Lucille's mother, Alex and Seb's stepmother & Delfin's wife.
- Anjo Damiles as Andrew "Andy" Delgado: Itoy's younger brother and the twins' childhood friend whom they consider as their brother.
- Gloria Sevilla as Anita: The maid of the Acosta-Dela Rosa family and close confidant of Lucille. Also Lucille's mother-figure during Barbara's absence.
- Krystal Mejes as Isabella D. Acosta / Rebecca "Becca" Suarez: Kara and Sebastian's biological daughter, Sara’s niece & adoptive daughter, Alex's niece, Hannah's adoptive sister/cousin, Laura and Antonio's granddaughter, and Lucille and Ishmael's adoptive granddaughter.
- Myel De Leon as Hannah D. Acosta: Kara and Sebastian's adoptive daughter, Isabella's adoptive sister/cousin, Laura, Ishmael, Lucille, and Antonio's adoptive granddaughter.
- Mickey Ferriols as Cynthia "Mother" Manrique: The kindhearted owner of Club Felicidad who took Sara and Becca under her care for six years and treated them as a daughter and granddaughter.
- Patricia Javier as Chloe Cabrera: Edward's mother who dislikes Kara and Sara for her son. She was once a mistress of Congressman Dante Ligaya.
- Nash Aguas as Paolo Acosta: Second cousin of Sebastian and Alex who has a crush on Patricia. Also works in the Dela Rosa Handog Buhay Foundation with Patricia.
- Alexa Ilacad as Patricia Hernandez: Julio's younger sister who is pressured by her brother and late parents to become a doctor in the future. She has a liking to Paolo and works with him in the Dela Rosa Handog Buhay Foundation.
- Polo Ravales as Julio Hernandez: Patricia's older brother and Alex & Dina's boss who owns a gambling syndicate. He was the one responsible for Dina's death (who was later on revealed to be alive & in hiding). He marries Alex after the latter becomes pregnant with his child.

=== Recurring ===
Actor	Character	Seasons					
Actor	Character	1	2	3	4	5	6
Alora Sasam	Camille Rose "CR" Sanchez	Recurring	Recurring	Recurring	Recurring	Recurring	Recurring
Loren Burgos	Olivia Ou	Recurring	Recurring	Recurring			
Ramon Christopher	Cong. Dante Ligaya	Recurring					
Michael Conan	Emilio	Recurring	Recurring	Recurring			
Jason Fernandez	Jhayson	Recurring	Recurring	Recurring	Recurring		
Chrisha Uy	Jessica	Recurring	Recurring	Recurring	Recurring		
Chiqui del Carmen	Lourdes		Recurring	Recurring			
Joe Vargas	Elvis		Recurring	Recurring	Recurring	Recurring	Recurring
Yesha Camile	Mikay		Recurring	Recurring			
Amy Nobleza	Bebeng		Recurring	Recurring			
Jay Chan Marquez	Gregory "Greg" Borromeo			Recurring			
Andrew Gan	Jeremy				Recurring	Recurring	
Luis Hontiveros	Patrick				Recurring	Recurring	
Joseph Ison	Gabo					Recurring	Recurring
Marx Topacio	Bogart					Recurring	Recurring
Jeff Luna	Adolfo						Recurring

- Alora Sasam as Camille Rose "CR" Sanchez: Kara's best friend who used to loathe her. She helps Kara run her business, "Hannah's Party Supplies."
- Loren Burgos as Olivia Ou: Kara and Camille Rose's former boss who takes pride in Kara and her works.
- Ramon Christopher as Cong. Dante Ligaya: Edward's father who had an affair with Chloe.
- Michael Conan as Emilio: Family driver of the Dela Rosa's.
- Jason Fernandez as Jhayson: One of Edward's former band members and husband of Jessica.
- Chrisha Uy as Jessica: One of Edward's former band members and wife of Jhayson.
- Chiqui del Carmen as Lourdes: Mikay and Bebeng's nanny and Seb and Alex's neighbor.
- Joe Vargas as Elvis: One of Seb's friends and brother figure who is part of the place where Seb used to live and work.
- Yesha Camile as Mikay: An inhabitant of Abot Kamay and a friend of Seb and Alex.
- Amy Nobleza as Bebeng: An inhabitant of Abot Kamay and a friend of Seb and Alex.
- Jay Chan Marquez as Gregory "Greg" Borromeo: A business tycoon and rival of Dela Rosa Builders. Barbara made a deal with him to buy Lucille's company to help Lucille bring her old self back.
- Andrew Gan as Jeremy: A friend and business partner of Edward who is the coordinator of the commercial where Becca starred.
- Luis Hontiveros as Patrick: One of Edward's trusted business partner and friend.
- Joseph Ison as Gabo: One of Julio and Alex's henchmen.
- Marx Topacio as Bogart: One of Julio and Alex's henchmen. He was later arrested by the police. Alex ordered Gabo to kill Bogart in fear that he will tell the police of all her evil plans.
- Jeff Luna as Adolfo: One of Alex's henchmen who later pledged his services to Lucille after realizing Alex's harsh directorship.

=== Guest ===
Actor	Character	Seasons					
Actor	Character	1	2	3	4	5	6
	Kristina Valera	Guest					
Dexie Daulat	Vianne Valera	Guest					
Frances Makil-Ignacio	Susan Ligaya	Guest					
Shey Bustamante	Xen	Guest					
Maila Gumila	Lorena Enriquez		Guest				
Eslove Briones	Eric		Guest				
Jerry O'Hara	Atty. Reyes			Guest	Guest	Guest	Guest
Mikey Caffrey	Company Assistant			Guest			
David Chua	Nestor Castillo			Guest	Guest		
Hannah Ledesma	Apple			Guest			
Markki Stroem	Frank			Guest			
Arisa Suzuki	Mikasa				Guest		
Kathleen Hermosa	Andrea				Guest	Guest	
Noel Colet	Mr. Joaquin Delgado				Guest		
Cristine Yao	Madeleine "Dina" Nicholas				Guest	Guest	Guest
Sunshine Garcia	Nancy Godinez					Guest	
Maria Isabel Lopez	Rona "Mayora" Mallari					Guest	
Kristel Fulgar	Kristine Mae "Kengkay" Dalisay					Guest	
Odette Khan	Caridad "Caring" Lacsamana					Guest	
Simon Ibarra	SPO1 Leandro Arellano					Guest	Guest
Alex Castro	Victor					Guest	
Franchesca Floirendo	Carol					Guest	
Irma Adlawan	Esmeralda "Esme" Hipolito	Special guest					
Avery Balasbas	young Kara & Sara	Special guest					
Marco Pingol	young Edward	Special guest					
Harvey Bautista	young Andy	Special guest					
Trajan Moreno	young Seb		Special guest				
Alyanna Angeles	young Alex		Special guest				

- Dexie Daulat as Vianne Valera: Kristina's daughter who got Ishmael fired due to young Sara.
- Frances Makil-Ignacio as Susan Ligaya: Dante's wife.
- Shey Bustamante as Xen: Edward's band's road manager.
- Maila Gumila as Lorena Enriquez: Kara's mother in law, Lucille and Alex's stepmother, Alex's adoptive mother, Seb's mother & Delfin's ex-lover.
- Eslove Briones as Eric: Sara's rapist.
- Jerry O'Hara as Atty. Reyes: Sara and the Suarez's attorney who helps them against Lucille and during the time when Sara was imprisoned due to her being suspected as a drug pusher because Mr. Delgado, her evil suitor.
- Mikey Caffrey as Company Assistant: An employee of Dela Rosa Builders.
- David Chua as Nestor Magdalang: A man Lucille hired to take out the brakes of the Suarez family's car, later blackmailed Lucille. Later Lucille later tried to have him killed and later he admitted the truth and helps the Suarez family against Lucille.
- Hannah Ledesma as Apple: A woman Lucille hired to destroy Laura and Ishmael's relationship by seducing Ishmael.
- Markki Stroem as Frank: A guy Sara dated.
- Arisa Suzuki as Mikasa: An admirer of Edward in Japan.
- Kathleen Hermosa as Andrea: Sara's friend from Japan, who knows the truth about the real Rebecca. Later returns to Sara's life and is the key to all the family's answers to all of Sara's secrets.
- Noel Colet as Mr. Joaquin Delgado: The man who attempted many times to date Sara, later got his revenge on Sara by ordering someone to plant drugs in Sara's bag. He later got caught and was sent to prison.
- Cristine Yao as Madeleine "Dina" Nicholas: A friend of Alex who is an accomplice of kidnapping Isabella. She also has a secret interest for Julio and becomes jealous of Alex. Currently, she is in hiding to avoid further complications with the Suarezes. She later tells the truth to the Suarez family that Alex killed Ishmael.
- Sunshine Garcia as Nancy Godinez: An inmate friend of Sara inside the prison.
- Maria Isabel Lopez as Rona "Mayora" Mallari: Head female inmate who made Sara's life miserable inside the prison and later, becomes an ally of Sara.
- Kristel Fulgar as Kristine Mae "Kengkay" Dalisay: Another inmate friend of Sara inside the prison.
- Odette Khan as Caridad "Lola Caring" Lacsamana: An old woman who became Sara's mother figure while she was inside the prison.
- Simon Ibarra as SPO1 Leandro Arellano: The detective who helps find evidence against Alex and Julio. His daughter was kidnapped once and that's why he wants to help Kara and Seb find the true mastermind of kidnapping Isabella.
- Alex Castro as Victor: Nancy's ex-boyfriend who cheated on her. It is later revealed that he now has a wife and son.
- Franchesca Floirendo as Carol: Julio's ex-girlfriend who murdered his parents. Later killed by Julio.
- Irma Adlawan as Esmeralda "Esme" Hipolito: Laura's deceased mother and the biological grandmother of Kara and Sara. She was a prostitute just like Laura and got impregnated and asked Laura not to follow her decision. She died because of AIDS.
- Avery Balasbas as young Kara & Sara: Kara is a happy child who succeeds in academics and is diagnosed with the deadly leukemia. Later got adopted by Antonio & Lucille and was treated. Sara has a fondness of contests and pageants and struggles in academics, but is street-smart.
- Marco Pingol as young Edward: Young Edward grew up difficult because he and Chloe were only a second family. He was brought to the hospital where he met a young Kara with leukemia.
- Harvey Bautista as young Andy: Andy is the twins’ childhood friend who grows to become active and comedic.
- Trajan Moreno as young Seb: Young Seb was at the same hospital where Kara and Edward was. He is similar to his adult attitude. While he was in the hospital, he met a young Kara not knowing that she will be his future bride.
- Alyanna Angeles as young Alex: Alex got separated from Seb due to an accident. She was poverty-stricken just like Sebastian after his mother Lorena's death. Later vowed that she will get her revenge against the Acostas.
