= Sarsi Emmanuelle =

Filipino actress (born 1966)

- Born: Maria Jennifer Obregon Mitchell; November 18, 1965 (age 60); Manila, Philippines
- Occupations: Actress, dancer
- Years active: 1980–2006; 2026–present
- Spouse: Francis Papillero (m. 2018)

Maria Jennifer Obregon Mitchell (born November 18, 1965), also known by her screen name Sarsi Emmanuelle, is a former dancer and actress in the Philippines. She earned a Best Actress nomination from the Gawad Urian Awards for Boatman.

== Career ==
Emmanuelle was born in Manila and attended Immaculate Conception Academy of Manila, an exclusive all-girls' school. She was one of the popular Softdrinks Beauties introduced in the 1980s along with Pepsi Paloma and Coca Nicolas. She starred in box-office hit films such as Snake Sisters (1984) directed by Celso Ad. Castillo, Matukso kaya ang Anghel (1984) directed by Leonardo Garcia, Bomba Queen (1985) as Yvonne, directed by Efren C. Piñon, Virgin Forest (1985) directed by Peque Gallaga, and Boatman (1985) directed by Tikoy Aguiluz. She also starred in Mario O'Hara's Bed Sins (1985) with Al Tantay, in Lino Brocka's White Slavery (1985) with Ricky Davao, in Elwood Perez's Silip (1986) with Mark Joseph, and Romy Suzara's Nude City (1986) with Ernie Garcia.

According to entertainment journalist Mario Dumaual, Emmanuelle's entertainment career suffered as a result of her multiple suicide attempts in late 1985. Emmanuelle was later cast by Viva Films in the action drama film Gabi Na, Kumander (1986) alongside Phillip Salvador, Bembol Roco and Dindo Fernando.

Her life story featured in the ABS-CBN's Maalaala Mo Kaya in 2003, where she was portrayed by Aubrey Miles. She played as the adoptive mother of Bea Alonzo in the TV series It Might Be You (2003–2004).

== Personal life ==
Emmanuelle was born to an American father; she had intended to move to the United States at the request of her father when offers were made to cast her in films and television programs.

In late 1985, Emmanuelle attempted to commit suicide multiple times.

== Filmography ==
=== Film ===
Year	Title	Role
1982	Brown Emmanuelle	
1984	Snake Sisters	
1984	Naked Island	Cresencia
1984	Matukso Kaya Ang Anghel	Laura
1984	Diegong Bayong	Meg
1985	Virgin Forest	Chayong
1985	Silip	Selda
1985	Bomba Queen	Yvonne
1985	Room 69	Cora
1985	Boatman	Gigi
1985	White Slavery	Joy
1985	Beware: Bed Sins	Carla
1986	Nude City	Elvira
1986	Clarizza	
1986	Gabi Na, Kumander	Geraldine
1987	Laruang Putik	
1988	Nakausap Ko ang Birhen	
2002	Alyas Bomba Queen	Myrna
2006	Raket ni Nanay	Mimosa

=== Television ===
Year	Title	Role
2002	Maalaala Mo Kaya	Tsubibo episode
2003	Maalaala Mo Kaya	Volleyball episode
2003–2004	It Might Be You	Guadalupe "Lupe" San Carlos
2026	FPJ's Batang Quiapo	Sarsi (cameo)
2026	Sigabo	Priscilla
