= Gabi Na, Kumander =

1986 Filipino film

- Directed by: Pepe Marcos
- Screenplay by: Rene Villanueva
- Story by: Bienvenido Bacalso
- Produced by: Ramon Salvador
- Starring: Phillip Salvador; Dindo Fernando
- Cinematography: Rey de Leon
- Edited by: Pepe Marcos
- Music by: Vehnee Saturno
- Production company: Viva Films
- Distributed by: Viva Films
- Release date: November 20, 1986
- Running time: 126 minutes
- Country: Philippines
- Languages: Filipino; English

Gabi Na, Kumander (transl. It's Night Time, Commander) is a 1986 Philippine action war film edited and directed by Pepe Marcos. The film stars Phillip Salvador and Dindo Fernando. The film is based on a popular radio drama. It also marks the film debut of Monsour del Rosario.

The film is streaming online on YouTube.

== Synopsis ==
During the Martial law, Kumander Cobra, a military soldier was appointed to fight against the rebels at Sto. Nino where he discovered that the head of the insurgent groups was his own brother Ronald, a former activist whom he believed was dead.

== Cast ==
- Phillip Salvador as Kumander Cobra
- Dindo Fernando as Maj. Ramil Maccan PA
- Bembol Roco as Diego
- Efren Reyes Jr. as 1st Lt. Caruncho A.P PA
- Anna Marie Gutierrez as Kumander Magdalena
- Jaclyn Jose as Mayeng
- Sarsi Emmanuelle as Geraldine
- Dindo Arroyo as Homer
- Eddie Garcia as Gen. Rodolfo V. Benitez AFP
- Tony Santos as Apo Layug
- Lito Pimentel as Kampay
- Jerick Miranda as Ilay

== Awards ==
Year	Awards	Category	Recipient	Result	Ref.
1987	35th FAMAS Awards	Best Picture	Gabi Na, Kumander	Won	
1987	35th FAMAS Awards	Best Director	Pepe Marcos	Nominated	
1987	35th FAMAS Awards	Best Actor	Phillip Salvador	Nominated	
1987	35th FAMAS Awards	Best Story	Bienvenido Bacalso	Won	
1987	8th CMMA	Best Picture	Gabi Na, Kumander	Won	
1987	8th CMMA	Best Screenplay	Rene Villanueva	Won	
