= Silip =

- Theatrical release poster
- Directed by: Elwood Perez
- Written by: Ricardo Lee
- Produced by: Wilson Tieng
- Starring: Ma. Isabel Lopez; Sarsi Emmanuelle
- Cinematography: Johnny Araojo
- Edited by: Edgardo Vinarao
- Music by: Lutgardo Labad
- Distributed by: Mondo Macabro (US DVD Release)
- Release date: February 7, 1986
- Running time: 125 minutes
- Country: Philippines
- Language: Filipino

Silip (lit. '"peek"') is a 1985 Philippine sexploitation psychological drama film directed by Elwood Perez and written by Ricardo Lee. The film was released outside of the Philippines as Daughters of Eve.

== Plot ==
In the remote countryside of Ilocos, various women are sexually abused by local men. Two sisters, Tonya (Maria Isabel Lopez), a sexually repressed young woman, and Selda (Sarsi Emmanuelle), a promiscuous woman, meet Simon (Mark Joseph), the most attractive man in the village. Tonya teaches catechism to the children of the village. Selda comes home from the city with her American lover, whom she throws out shortly afterward. She's the exact opposite of Tonya, as her views on sex are more liberal and less guilt-filled. Tonya is secretly sexually attracted to Simon, but she refuses his sexual advances.

== Partial cast ==
- Ma. Isabel Lopez as Tonya
- Sarsi Emmanuelle as Selda
- Mark Joseph as Simon
- Myra Manibog as Mona
- Daren Craig Johnson as Ronald
- Michael Locsin as Miguel (as Michael Angelo)
- Arwin Rogelio as Tiago
- Jenneelyn Gatbalite as Gloria
- Pia Zabale as Pia
- Jimmy Reyes as Village leader #1
- Gloria Andrade as Aling Anda
- Arthur Cassanova as Village leader #2 (as Arthur Casanova)
- Chabeng Contreras as Tonya's grandma
- Cheriebee Santos as Child #1 (as Cherriebee Santos)

== Production ==
Sarsi Emmanuelle and Maria Isabel Lopez claimed that they had been almost raped for real while filming a scene in this movie. Sarsi reportedly suffered a nervous breakdown and had to be hospitalized for a week. In a 2007 interview, Maria Isabel Lopez recalled what happened: "In one scene we were tied and in a tent, and there were a group of men who were going to gang rape us. And I cannot imagine why they really tied us so hard. So I said, 'This is too much, this is too painful!' And I realized that they wanted us to struggle - like Elwood Perez motivated the actors to attempt to really touch us, and that we would be angry, he wanted to show that anger. So I actually resented Elwood for a while after that scene. But of course I also got over it. I finally understood the director's intentions."

== Release ==
First released in 1985, the film was released nationwide on February 7, 1986.

=== Home media ===
It was released on DVD by Mondo Macabro in 2007. The region-one two-DVD set has soundtracks in both Tagalog and English. In 2021, the film was released on Blu-ray Disc with an additional commentary track.

== Reception ==
Of the DVD release, Kurt Dahlke of DVD Talk noted that Silip: Daughters of Eve is an exploitation film, but "not your usual empty-headed sleaze show," and he remarked that viewers simply looking for a sexploitation film will not understand Silip. He expands on this by writing, "Other reviewers have complained of the long, boring bits in between each scandalous act, completely missing the point," and he explains that unlike many films of its genre, Silip delivers its message "in small-scale epic fashion, with a lyric beauty that's hard to argue against. Using the desert-like scenery to maximum effect, nearly every shot is beautiful to look at, fostering a meditative, sweaty atmosphere that's truly unique." He goes on to praise the cinematography and the simultaneous themes that play out in the film and summarizes "While the women-are-the-root-of-all-evil message is ultimately distasteful, the truths exposed, and the path we're lead [sic] down in getting there, consists of quite a sumptuous, sensuous journey."
