= Kirara, Ano ang Kulay ng Pag-ibig? =

Philippine television drama series

- Title card
- Also known as: Kirara, What is the Color of Love?
- Genre: Drama
- Directed by: Gina Alajar; Jose Rowell Icamen; Jeffrey Jeturian
- Starring: Erika Ann Luna; Patricia Javier
- Theme music composer: Joey de Leon (lyrics); Vic Sotto (music)
- Opening theme: "Ano ang Kulay ng Pag-ibig?" by Vic Sotto
- Country of origin: Philippines
- Original language: Tagalog
- No. of episodes: 566

Production
- Executive producers: Antonio P. Tuviera; Malou Choa-Fagar
- Producer: Antonio P. Tuviera
- Production locations: Pampanga, Philippines; Manila, Philippines
- Camera setup: Multiple-camera setup
- Running time: 30—45 minutes
- Production company: TAPE Inc.

Original release
- Network: GMA Network
- Release: August 16, 1999 – November 2, 2001

Kirara, Ano ang Kulay ng Pag-ibig? (trans. / international title: Kirara, What is the Color of Love?) is a Philippine television drama series broadcast by GMA Network. Directed by Gina Alajar, it stars Erika Ann Luna and Patricia Javier both in the title role. It premiered on August 16, 1999. The series concluded on November 2, 2001, with a total of 566 episodes.

== Cast and characters ==
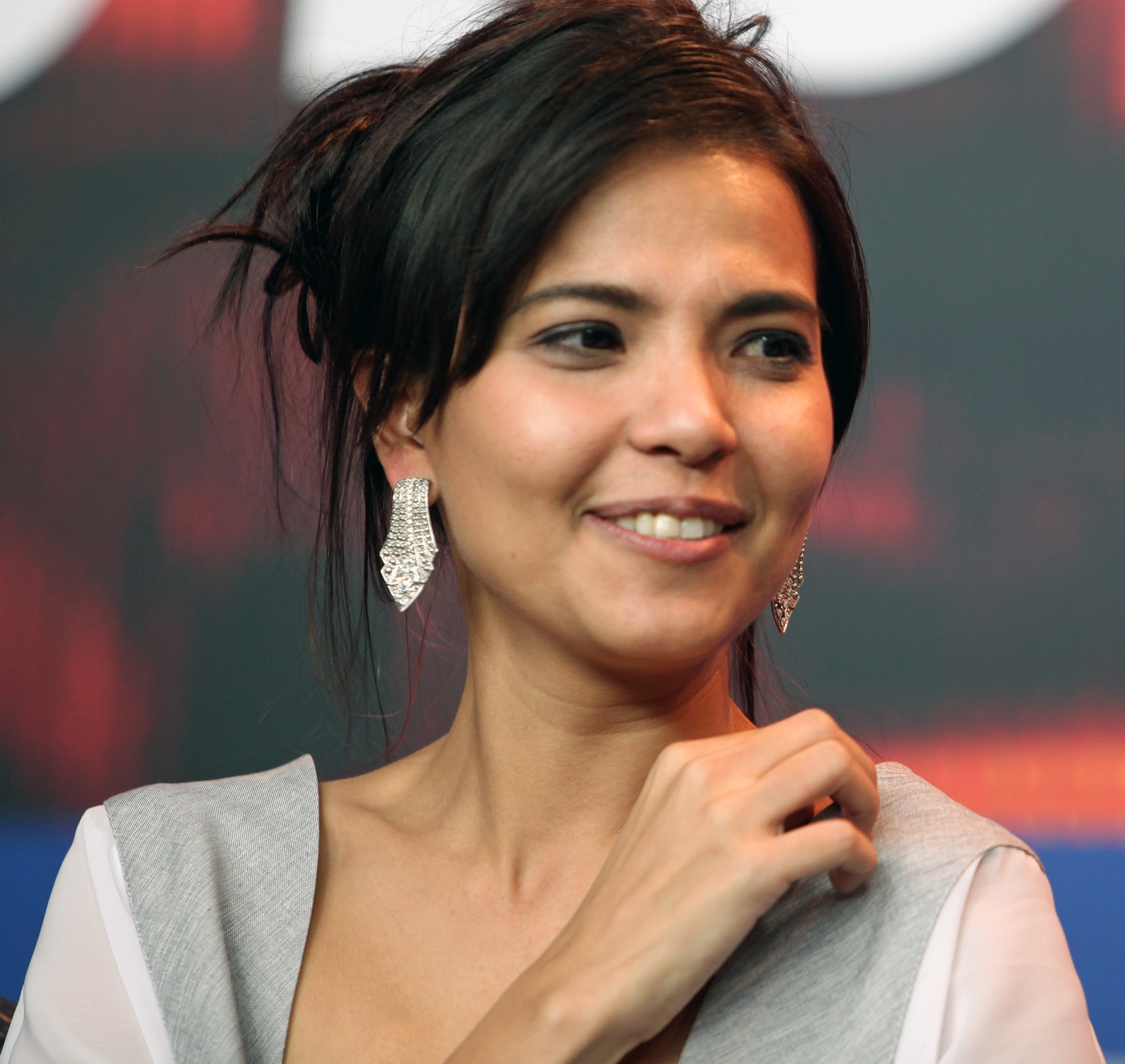
Alessandra De Rossi portrays Emily.

Lead cast

- Erika Ann Luna as younger Kirara
- Patricia Javier as older Kirara

Supporting cast

- Amy Austria as Rose
- Sandy Andolong as Charito
- Tirso Cruz III as Jon
- Daniel Fernando as Ka Puroy
- Joonee Gamboa as Romano Santillanes
- Leni Rivera as Vicky
- Ryan Eigenmann as Bulik
- Aya Medel as Bening / Raquel
- Geoff Eigenmann as Joshua
- Joanne Miller as Shirley
- Alessandra de Rossi as Emily
- Cris Cruz as Emil
- Ian de Leon as Fred
- Gigette Reyes as Leona
- Rayver Cruz as younger Joseph
- Eugene Domingo as Belen
- Chat Silayan-Bailon as Elaine
- Francis Ricafort as Jonard
- Joepri Mariano as Ricky
- Viel Lobitana as Viel
- Bernabeth Joyce Elipane as Dindi De Guia
- Raymond Bagatsing as Miguel
- Amy Austria as Rose
- Robin Da Rosa as Joseph
- Maureen Larrazabal as Sabrina
- Nicole Hofer as Jenny
- Alvin Anson as Raffy
- Marcus Madrigal as Michael

== Accolades ==
Accolades received by Kirara, Ano ang Kulay ng Pag-ibig?
Year	Award	Category	Recipient	Result	Ref.
2000	14th PMPC Star Awards for Television	Best Drama Series	Kirara, Ano ang Kulay ng Pag-ibig?	Won	
