= Maria Isabel Lopez =

Filipina movie and television actress

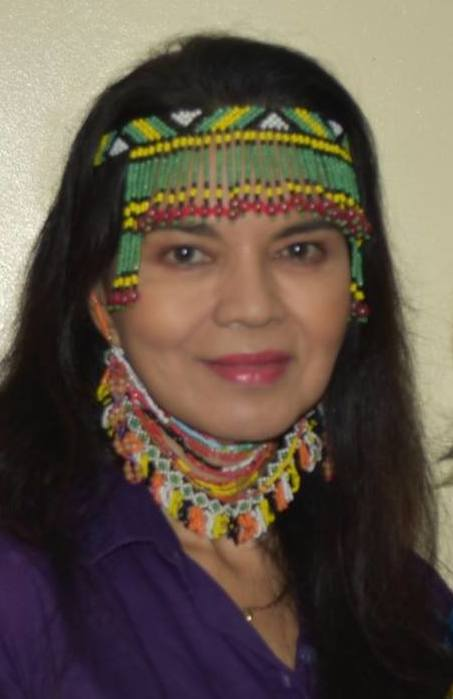
- Lopez in July 2017
- Born: Cagayan de Oro, Misamis Oriental, Philippines
- Education: University of the Philippines
- Occupations: Beauty pageant titleholder; actress; model; mosaic artist
- Height: 1.65 m (5 ft 5 in)
- Spouses: Hiroshi Yokohama (m. 1990; ann. 2006) Jonathan Melrod (m. 2019)
- Children: Mara Isabella Yokohama; Kenyo Yokohama
- Beauty pageant titleholder
- Title: Binibining Pilipinas Universe 1982
- Years active: 1982–present
- Hair color: Black
- Eye color: Brown
- Major competitions: Binibining Pilipinas 1982 (Winner – Binibining Pilipinas Universe 1982); Miss Universe 1982 (Unplaced)

Maria Isabel Pagunsan Lopez—Melrod is a Filipino actress and beauty pageant titleholder. Lopez won the Binibining Pilipinas Universe 1982 and represented the Philippines in the 31st Miss Universe Pageant in Lima, Peru.

She became known as the first beauty queen and actress appearing in Sex in film. Lopez was married to Hiroshi Yokohama, and then later married Jonathan Melrod in the United States. She is a mosaic artist and has appeared in various roles in Philippine cinema and television.

== Pageantry ==
Lopez was born in Cagayan de Oro to Benjamin Lopez and Crescencia Pagunsan. She was baptized at the Saint Augustine Metropolitan Cathedral. She had three immediate siblings and was later raised in Sampaloc, Manila by a single mother due to her father having a mistress and extramarital children.

Before joining beauty pageants, she worked as a fashion designer at The SM Store and Rustan's department store. She also modeled for various fashion salons, including that of LGBT fashion designer, Mr. Rodolfo Fuentes (1950–2011), who encouraged her to join Binibining Pilipinas. In 1982 (aged 20), she joined the pageant as candidate number #15 and won the Binibining Pilipinas Universe title.

She was almost dethroned of her title because of the eventual discovery of her previous work as a lingerie sexy model in a Girard Peter fashion show by the clothes designer Mr. Gerardo Reyes, which accordingly violated an immorality clause set by pageant director Stella Araneta. Lopez maintains that she was pressured to resign, but she refused to do so, citing the assistance of her personal manager and Viva Films to counteract dethronement.

During her national competition, Lopez gained notoriety when she was asked (mistakenly) about virginity by Philippine judge and actress Margarita “Rita” Gomez (1935–1990). In actuality, the question was given for Janet Sales of Manila and was falsely spread in association with Lopez. During her national competition, she was asked by American drummer Alphonse Mouzon regarding the independence of women. At her coronation night, her name was initially mispronounced as Maricar Isabel Lopez, later corrected.

== Film work ==
Lopez became controversial when she appeared in highly sexualized roles in movies, which was not usually expected of a beauty queen titleholder. Her first movie Sana, Bukas Pa ang Kahapon (English: "Hoping Yesterday is still Tomorrow") in 1983, starred Hilda Koronel, Lorna Tolentino, Dindo Fernando, and Jay Ilagan, and was directed by Romy Suzara. She was in the original cast of Working Girls (1984), a comedy film directed by National Artist Ishmael Bernal, where she starred as a young office worker who entered sex work at night to gain more income. In 1988, Lopez was hired as a commercial sexy model for White Castle Whiskey.

During the height of her popularity, Lopez appeared in more sexual and romantic movies, including the following:

- Silip: Daughters of Eve — by Elwood Perez (1985)
- Isla (English: "Island") — by Celso Ad Castillo (1985)
- Hubo sa Dilim — (English: “Naked in the Dark”) (1985)
- Mga Nakaw Na Sandali — (English: “Stolen Moments”) (1986)
- Dingding Lang ang Pagitan — (English: “Only Thin Walls in Between”) (1986)

She won the Golden Screen Award Best Supporting Actress Award for Kinatay (English: “Butchered”) (2009). Lopez walked the red carpet at the Cannes International Film Festival in France for Brilliante Mendoza's award-winning film, Kinatay (2009). Lopez again walked the red carpet at the Cannes International Film Festival in France for Brilliante Mendoza's award-winning film, Ma'Rosa (2016).

Lopez was the line producer for Tulak (2009), and HIV: Si Heidi, Si Ivy at Si V (2010). She was cast again in the 2010 remake of Working Girls, produced by GMA Films under the helm of Jose Javier Reyes. Lopez was one of the castaways in GMA Network's Survivor Philippines: Celebrity Doubles Showdown (2011–2012), in tandem with her daughter, Mara Lopez, who was also an actress. She played the mother of Sid Lucero in GMA-7's prime time series, Legacy (2012).

== Controversies ==
In 2009, Lopez became the center of controversy when she was not given a complimentary ticket for the Binibining Pilipinas 2009 pageant, an oversight she strongly resented in public. During this year, the 18th Miss Universe gave her a pageant entrance ticket, though she was not designated to sit in the reservation box allotted to former beauty titleholders.

In 2010, Lopez became involved in a conflict with various Philippine journalists, including Ricky Lo, who implied in tabloid newspapers that Lopez strongly desired the passing of Stella Araneta. Lopez vehemently denied the allegation, but maintained the accusation that Araneta is an elitist who refuses to address people of impoverished backgrounds due to her grandiose ego. Lopez maintains that Araneta has never forgiven her for making sexualized films after her reign as Miss Philippines 1982.

In 2016, Lopez gained notoriety for a green pageant gown she wore in the 2015 Cannes Film Festival because she compared her evening gown to the one used by the 64th Miss Universe.

In January 2017, Lopez revealed on the morning show Unang Hirit the strong discrimination against dark-skinned contestants during her time as a beauty queen. She noted that during the Miss Universe 1982 visit at the Presidential Palace in Peru, the former first lady Pilar Nores de García was dismissive of the dark-skinned contestants, namely Miss Papua New Guinea and Miss Turks and Caicos.

In November 2017, Lopez was penalized for removing traffic cones and illegally driving on the lane reserved for the delegates of the 31st ASEAN Summit that was hosted in the Philippines. She posted her actions on Facebook livestream, which prompted the Metropolitan Manila Development Authority to recommend to the Land Transportation Office to suspend or cancel her driver's license. Lopez later claimed that seeing other vehicles using the ASEAN lane prompted her to drive on it as well. The office later revoked her license and barred her from reapplying and reacquiring her license for the next two years. She was also fined ₱8,000 (US$160) for ignoring traffic signs, reckless driving, and violating the Anti-Distracted Driving Act. Lopez accepted the civil charges and issued a public apology amidst widespread demand.

== Personal life ==
Lopez first married Hiroshi Yokohama, a former DHL executive, in 1990. The couple wed and lived in Edogawa, Tokyo, Japan, then later moved to the Philippines. They separated in 2006 due to claims of abuse and infidelity, which later resulted in a marital annulment formalized in 2010. They have two children, Mara Lopez, an actress, and Kenyo Yokohama, a civil engineering graduate of Saint John the Baptist de la Salle University. On 9 June 2019, Lopez married a Jewish—American former human rights lawyer, Jonathan Melrod, and now residing in Sebastopol, California.

Lopez studied at the Holy Trinity Catholic school in Sampaloc, Manila and later studied Fine Arts at the University of the Philippines Diliman. She is a member of the National Commission for Culture and the Arts. She served as Secretary of the Committee on Visual Arts from 2011 to 2013. Lopez also completed art classes in the Chicago Mosaic School and the Institute of Mosaic Art in Berkeley, California. In 2015, she toured UNESCO Italian mosaics in Ravenna, Italy as part of her interest in mosaics.

== Selected filmography ==
=== Film ===
Year	Title	Role	Notes
1983	Dugong Buhay		
1983	Sana, Bukas Pa ang Kahapon	Candy	
1984	Isla	Isla	
1984	Working Girls	Rose	
1984	Batuigas II: Pasukuin si Waway		
1985	Hubo sa Dilim		
1985	Heartache City	Joji	
1985	Hello Lover, Goodbye Friend		
1985	Escort Girls		
1986	Bakit Naglaho ang Magdamag		
1986	Kapirasong Dangal		
1986	Dingding ang Pagitan		
1986	Mga Nakaw na Sandali		
1986	Huwag Pamarisan: Kulasisi		
1986	Unang Gabi		
1986	Hayok		
1986	Silip	Tonya	
1987	When Good Girls Go Wrong		
1987	Born to Gamble (爛賭英雄)	贏馬	Hong Kong film directed by Wong Jing
1988	Red Roses for a Call Girl		
1989	Sa Kuko Ng Agila	Shirley	
1989	Boots Oyson: Sa Katawan Mo, Aagos ang Dugo		
1999	Sindak	Balikbayan	
2002	Super B	Nanay Mameng	
2008	Ay Ayeng		
2009	Fidel	Minda	
2009	Kinatay	Madonna/Gina	
2009	Hilot		
2009	Tulak		
2010	Pilantik		
2010	Working Girls		
2010	Ways of the Sea		Original title: Halaw
2010	Ang Babae sa Sementeryo	Barbara	
2010	Ika-Sampu		
2010	HIV: Si Heidi, si Ivy at si V	Heidi	Also line producer
2011	Cuchera		
2011	Sirip		
2011	Ritwal (The Faith Fools)	Madam Celia	
2012	Captive	Marianne Agudo Pineda	
2012	Corazon: Ang Unang Aswang	Herminia	
2012	Mariposa: Sa Hawla ng Gabi		
2013	Angustia		
2013	The Search for Weng Weng		
2013	Ang Misis ni Meyor		
2014	Kabaro		
2014	Flying Kiss		
2014	Maria Leonora Teresa	Linda	
2014	Tres		"Tata Selo" segment
2014	Lorna		
2015	The Comeback		
2016	Just the 3 of Us	Lulu Manalo	
2016	Ma' Rosa	Tilde	
2016	Pamilya Ordinaryo	Cess	
2016	Barcelona: A Love Untold	Belinda Alfaro	
2016	Siphayo	Fely	
2019	Lola Igna	Nida	
2024	Diamonds in the Sand	Minerva	

=== Television ===
Year	Title	Role
1998	Halik sa Apoy	Marta
2004	Spirits	Queen of the Engkanto
2007	Magpakailanman: The Liza Dela Cruz Story	unknown
2009	Lovers In Paris	Julia Francisco-Gatus
2009	Maalaala Mo Kaya: Videoke	Letty
2009	Parekoy	Mother Dear
2009	Maalaala Mo Kaya: Kalendaryo	Lucing
2010	Precious Hearts Romances Presents: Alyna	Fausta Del Carmen
2010	Star Confessions: Tisay - The Lala Montelibano Confession	Lydia
2010	Precious Hearts Romances Presents: Love Me Again	Sonia Barrera
2010	Maalaala Mo Kaya: Saranggola	Luzviminda
2011	Maalaala Mo Kaya: Tungkod	Linda
2011	Maalaala Mo Kaya: Bracelet	Bebeng
2012	Magdalena: Anghel sa Putikan	Julia "Huling" Hermoso
2012	Kung Ako'y Iiwan Mo	Sonia Pedroso
2012	Maalaala Mo Kaya: Gong	Apeng Sukay
2012	Legacy	Lala Salcedo
2012	Kapitan Awesome	Samantha Hussein
2013	Bayan Ko	Sylvia Rubio
2014	Ang Lihim ni Annasandra	Rosario
2014	Ipaglaban Mo: Paano Na Ang Pangarap?	Aling Mila
2014	The Legal Wife	Sandra De Villa
2015	Pangako sa 'Yo	Isabel Miranda
2015	Bridges of Love	Veronica
2015	Karelasyon	Belinda
2015	Imbestigador: Hinalay sa loob ng bahay (Gupit Panty)	Janet Buenavista
2016	Doble Kara	Rona Mallari
2016	FPJ's Ang Probinsyano	Clarissa Subito
2016	Wansapanataym: Candy's Crush	Venus Angara
2016	Maalaala Mo Kaya: Pole	Samantha
2017	Haplos	Corazon 'Cora' Maglalim
2017	Imbestigador: Nagbigti o Binigti	Selya
2018	Ngayon at Kailanman	Lucia Simbajon
2018	Bagani	Doray
2018	Maalaala Mo Kaya: Barya	Victoria
2019	Sino ang May Sala?: Mea Culpa	Maribel Baniaga
2022	Love in 40 Days	Roberta "Berta" Ignacio
2025	Widows' War	Soledad Palacios
