= Virgin Forest (1985 film) =

1985 period war drama film by Peque Gallaga

- Directed by: Peque Gallaga
- Screenplay by: Rosauro Q. Dela Cruz
- Story by: T.E. Pagaspas (Note: The name "T.E. Pagaspas" is a collective name that consists of directors Peque Gallaga and Lore Reyes, writer Rosauro Q. Dela Cruz, and production designer Don Escudero.)
- Produced by: Lily Yu Monteverde
- Starring: Sarsi Emmanuel; Miguel Rodriguez; Abel Jurado
- Cinematography: Conrado Baltazar
- Edited by: Jess Navarro
- Music by: Jaime Fabregas
- Production company: Regal Films
- Distributed by: Regal Films
- Release date: January 22, 1985
- Running time: 139 minutes
- Country: Philippines
- Languages: Filipino; English; Spanish

Virgin Forest is a 1985 Filipino war drama directed by Peque Gallaga from a story developed by T.E. Pagaspas, with Rosauro Q. Dela Cruz solely adapted the concept into a screenplay. A self-described B-movie, it stars Sarsi Emmanuel, Chayong, a barrio lass of Chinese ancestry; Miguel Rodriguez as Alfonsito, a Filipino-Spanish ilustrado; and Abel Jurado as Alipio, the lover of Sarsi's character. It also stars Leo Martinez, Ama Quiambao, Bruce Fanger, and Bob Zwanziger.

== Synopsis ==
The film is set in the 1900s during the First Philippine Republic. Macabebe soldiers are trying to capture Emilio Aguinaldo. Alfonisto (Miguel Rodriguez) and Chayong (Sarsi Emmanuel) are caught up in this pursuit and in a love triangle. In the end, Aguinaldo is captured, and the Macabebe soldiers are killed.

== Plot ==
In the town of San Mateo, Tayabas, on March 19, 1901, Chayong and Alipio, who were having sex in the beach, were caught by the Guardia Civil and imprisoned in the town jail. On the same day, the revolutionaries took control of the town from the Americans and captured all of its Spaniard population.

== Cast ==
- Sarsi Emmanuel as Chayong
- Miguel Rodriguez as Alfonsito
- Abel Jurado as Alipio
- Jed Arboleda as Fonseca
- Arbie Antonio as Lt. Col. Pablo Dalmacio
- Bruce Fanger as Gallagher
- Bob Zwanziger as Snyder
- Ama Quiambao as Nana Isay
- Turko Cervantes and Pen Medina as leaders of the Macabebes
- Peque Gallaga as Kamaggay
- Leo Martinez as Hepe Elpidio Sales, the chief of the Guardia Civil
- Cris Daluz as Mayordomo
- Alfredo Saludares as the Mayordomo's son
- Mario Taguiwalo and Abbo Q. Dela Cruz as Guardia Civil soldiers
- Pepito Bosch as Priest
- Ray Ventura as Chua Tek

== Production ==
Virgin Forest is director Brillante Mendoza's first film production, working as the production designer under the name Dante Mendoza.
