= Nakausap Ko ang Birhen =

1988 religious drama film starring Lotlot de Leon

- Directed by: Mike Relon Makiling
- Written by: Tony Mortel; Mike Relon Makiling
- Produced by: Lily Y. Monteverde
- Starring: Lotlot de Leon; Ramon Christopher; Eddie Garcia; Janice de Belen; Snooky Serna; Barbara Perez; Sarsi Emmanuelle; Marissa Delgado
- Cinematography: Ben Lobo
- Edited by: Efren Jarlego
- Music by: Vehnee Saturno
- Production company: Regal Films
- Release date: March 24, 1988
- Running time: 107 minutes
- Country: Philippines
- Language: Filipino

Nakausap Ko ang Birhen (lit. 'I Was Able to Speak with the Virgin') is a 1988 Filipino religious drama film directed by Mike Relon Makiling, written by Makiling and Tony Mortel, and starring Lotlot de Leon, Ramon Christopher, Eddie Garcia, Janice de Belen, Snooky Serna, Barbara Perez, Sarsi Emmanuelle, and Marissa Delgado. Produced by Regal Films for the Lenten season, it was released on March 24, 1988. Critic Luciano E. Soriano of the Manila Standard gave the film a negative review, criticizing its superficial qualities and spotty writing which prevented the film from having spiritual depth.

== Plot ==
Milagros, is a young lady living with her parents Apiong and Merlie, who owns a prostitution house. She's in love with Nestor, a rich young boy. Despite her parents' sinful business, she would often pray to the Blessed Virgin Mary. But, Apiong disapprove Milagros's relationship to Nestor, so Milagros had no choice but to break up with Nestor. One night, Milagros was about to be having a one night stand with a dirty old man. Nestor tried to rescue Milagros, but Apiong's men beat him. In a fit of anger, Nestor burned down Apiong's house, forcing him and his family to move to a house along the sea. Milagros was also given healing powers by the Virgin. Apiong would use Milagros to earn money from donations. One night, after Milagros witnesses Apiong counting money from donations, the Blessed Virgin Mary appeared to Milagros, and told her to dig at the back of the house. Thinking that there are hidden treasures buried, Apiong decided to help Milagros. Water would flow after Milagros digged deeper. The water would have healing abilities. She used it to a crippled woman named Julia, who doesn't believe in God. She attempted to make Julia walk, but to no avail. Many people would go to Milagros and ask for healing, including Nestor's father who was paralyzed because of a stroke. Nestor decided to stay with Milagros and help her. When Apiong noticed that the well has no water, they decided to refill it with lots of water. As the people came, Milagros said that she will stop healing people. But, Apiong told her that it's the only way for them to earn more money. As Milagros came, she said to the people that she has no longer have healing powers and exposed her father's evil scheme. An angry mob tried to stone her, but she saw Julia able to walk again.

Apiong decided to go back to Manila and return to their old business of hiring women as prostitutes. But, he suffered a heart attack. Milagros asked the Virgin to heal Apiong, and he was miraculously cured. Milagros told Nestor that she is now considering herself to enter the convent and become a nun. Upon entering the convent, the nun in-charge of her Sister Rafaelita, knows everything about her. Due to this, she is cold-hearted and hostile towards Milagros, but Milagros accepted every ridicule and torment. She noticed that the wounds in her both knees are now bleeding. But, she never complaint about her wounds. One day, while tending a garden, Milagros saw the Blessed Virgin and fainted.

The doctor who examined her, said that she might have bone cancer. He also noticed that the wounds in her knees had a fragrant smell. Sister Rafaelita continued to ridicule Milagros and told her that she's being punished by God. Milagros prayer to the Virgin to visit her so that Sister Rafaelita would believe in her. Sister Rafaelita saw a bright light inside Milagros's room. There, she saw Milagros with the Virgin Mary. There, she broke out and questioned God despite the years of service to Him. A remorseful Sister Rafaelita asked forgiveness to Milagros and took care of her in her final days. She was then visited by Apiong and Merlie. They asked forgiveness to Milagros for their selfishness. She would be visited by her neighbors including Julia who is now married and had a child. Nestor, who is now a seminarian to become a priest, was the last to visit Milagros. He said that she was the first and last love until Milagros died. Milagros was given a funeral fit for a saint, while Nestor is looking up in the sky. There she would see Milagros, going up to heaven with the Blessed Virgin Mary.

== Cast ==
- Lotlot de Leon as Milagros
- Ramon Christopher as Nestor
- Eddie Garcia as Apiong, Milagros' father
- Janice de Belen as Julia, a crippled non-believer
- Snooky Serna as the Virgin Mary
- Barbara Perez as the mother superior
- Sarsi Emmanuelle
- Marissa Delgado as Merlie, Milagros' mother
- Subas Herrero as Don Ricardo
- Bella Flores as Sister Rafaelita
- Ramil Rodriguez
- Alicia Alonzo
- Nanding Fernandez
- Vicky Suba
- Vangie Labalan
- Alma Lerma
- Marilyn Villamayor
- Mike Austria
- Melissa Silvano
- Manolette Ripoll
- Arlan Israel
- Maila Marcelo
- Andro Guevarra
- Paul Pereyrra
- Patricia Javier
- Harvey Vizcarra
- Bert Mansueto
- Bamba
- Atong

== Release ==
Nakausap Ko ang Birhen was rated "B" by the Movie and Television Review and Classification Board (MTRCB), indicating a "Good" quality, and was released on March 24, 1988.

=== Critical response ===
Luciano E. Soriano of the Manila Standard gave Nakausap Ko ang Birhen a negative review. Though he appreciated that a major studio like Regal Films made an effort to produce a religious film for the Lenten season, he criticized the film's shallow approach to its profound story, and cited among others a "facile" storyline involving Christopher's character Nestor entering the seminary after breaking up with Milagros. Soriano also criticized the inconsistencies in the film's screenplay, highlighting lapses in logic such as Nestor not being jailed for committing arson to Milagros' parents' whorehouse. In addition, Soriano was critical of Garcia and Flores' caricature-like exaggerated performances which undermined the seriousness that the film is striving for. Soriano concluded that with its superficial qualities, "[i]ts objective is clearly material and not spiritual."
