= Patricia Javier =

Filipino actress

Patricia Javier-Walcher
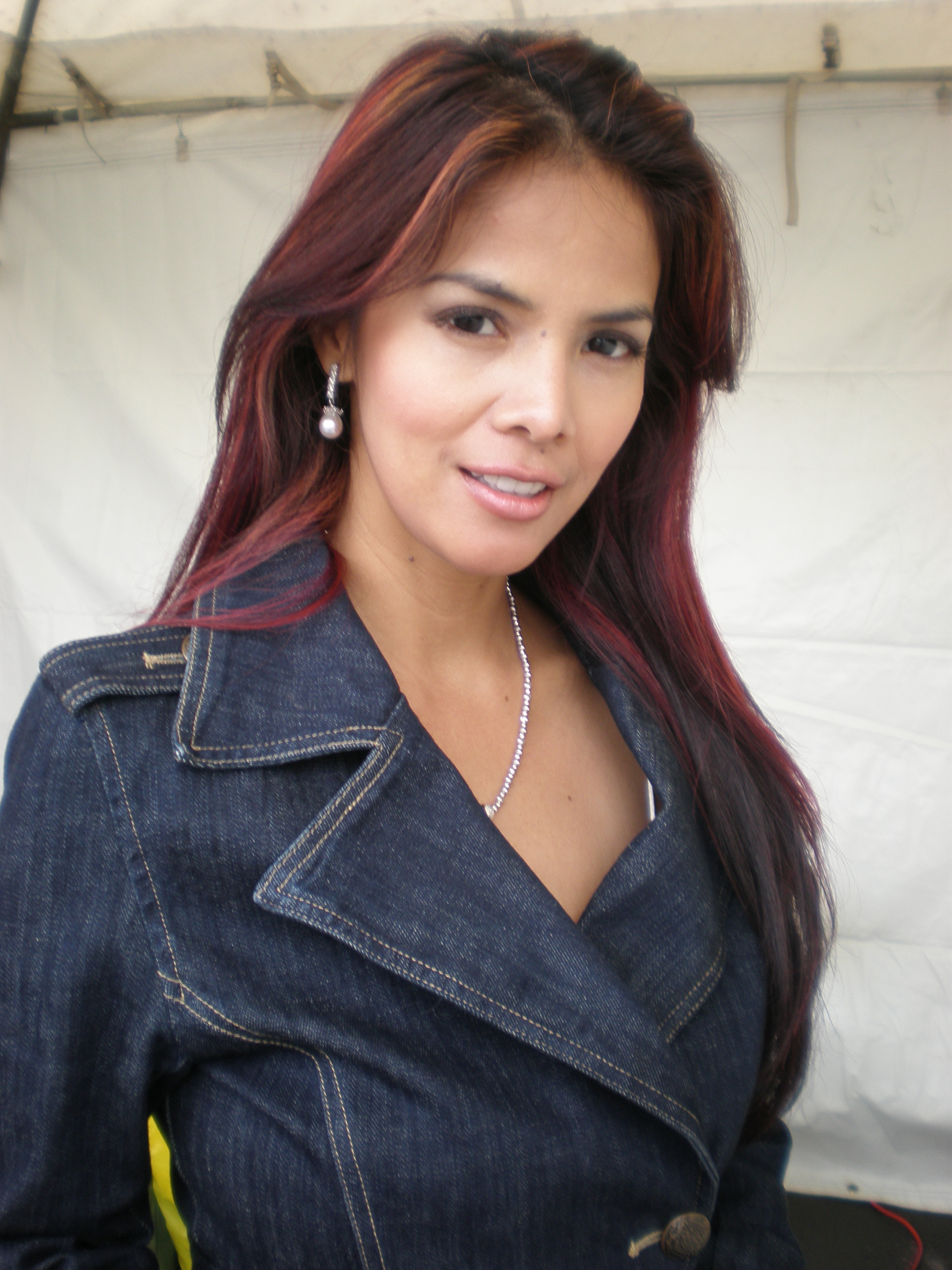
- Born: Patricia Javier; May 16, 1975 (age 51); Antipolo, Rizal, Philippines
- Occupations: Actress, Model
- Years active: 1999–present
- Agent: VIVA Artist Agency
- Spouse: Dr. Robert Walcher (m. 2005)
- Children: 2

Patricia Javier-Walcher (born May 16, 1975) is a Filipino actress, model, and singer. Her television work includes Growing Up, Ikaw Lang ang Mamahalin, Doble Kara, and Haplos. Her film credits include Ang Kabit ni Mrs. Montero, Alas-Dose, Mahal Kita, Final Answer, and Operation Balikatan. She was crowned Mrs. Universe Philippines 2019 and later won the Noble Queen of the University pageant in 2019.

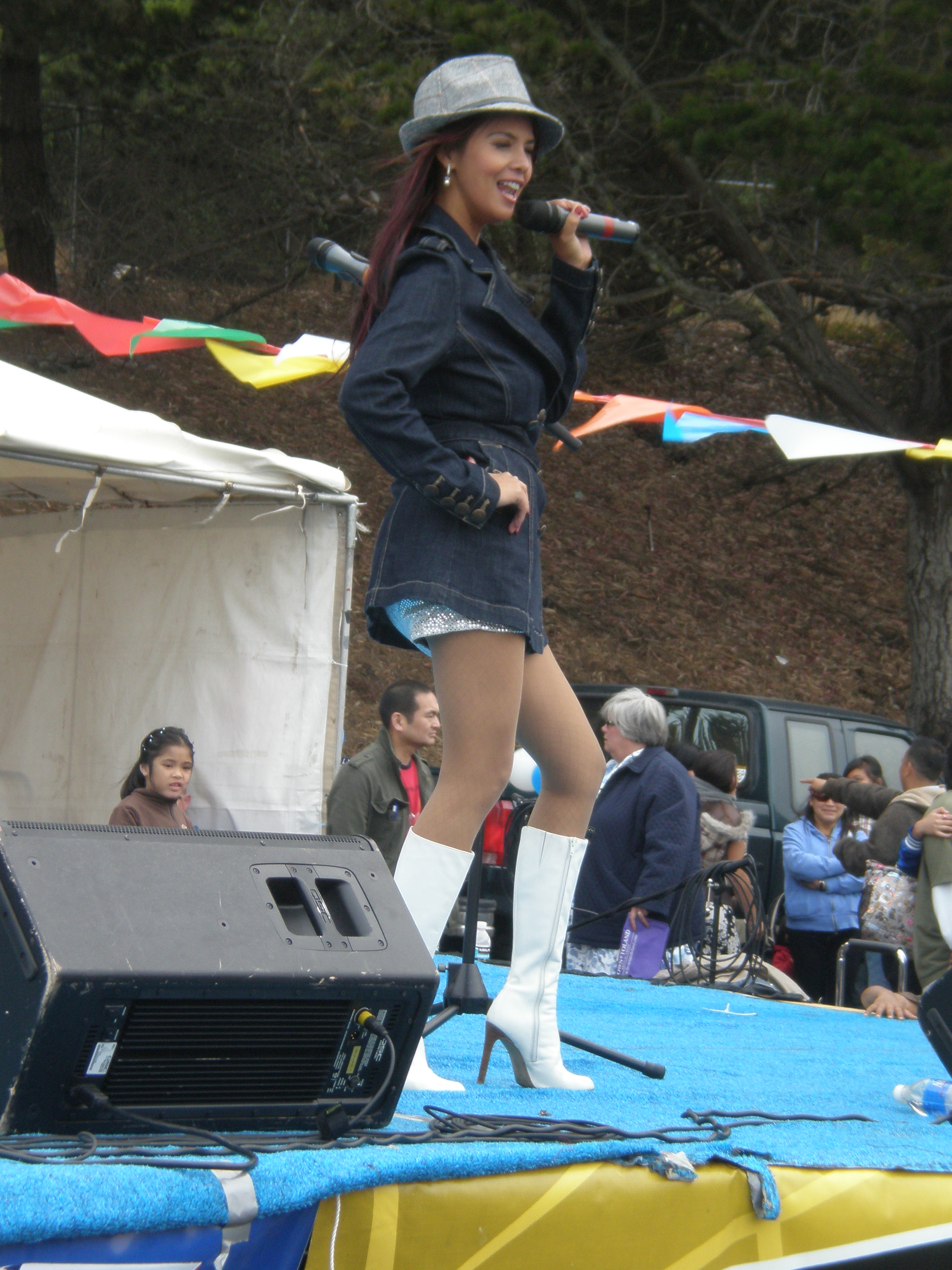
Patricia Javier performing at 14th AF-AFC

== Career ==
Javier started her television career with GMA Network, appearing in Growing Up in 1999 and Ikaw Lang ang Mamahalin in 2002. Her film credits from the late 1990s and early 2000s include Nakausap Ko ang Birhen, Lethal Panther 2, Lagalag: The Eddie Fernandez Story, Ang Kabit ni Mrs. Montero, Basta't Ikaw... Nanginginig Pa, Alas-Dose, Tatarin, Mahal Kita, Final Answer, and Operation Balikatan.

In 2015, Javier returned to television through the ABS-CBN drama series Doble Kara. PEP described the series as her comeback project, and later noted that she played the mother of Edgar Allan Guzman's character in the series.

In 2017, Javier returned to GMA Network for the afternoon series Haplos. GMA News stated that she played the mother of Sanya Lopez's character, while PEP identified her character as Minda, the mother of Angela.

Javier also recorded music. Deezer lists her 2002 album Patricia Javier, the 2015 single Ngayong Paskong Ito, and the 2016 album Reinvented.

In pageantry, Javier was crowned Mrs. Universe Philippines 2019 in 2018. In 2019, she won the first noble Queen of the Universe pageant.

== Filmography ==
=== Film ===
- Ang Kabit ni Mrs. Montero (1999)
- Basta Ikaw, Nanginginig Pa (1999)
- Alas-Dose (2001)
- Mahal Kita, Final Answer (2002)
- A.B. Normal College: Todo Na 'Yan! Kulang Pa 'Yun! (2003)
- Nakausap Ko ang Berhen
- Lethal Panther 2
- Lagalag: The Eddie Fernandez Story
- Sumigaw Ka anggang Gusto Mo
- Ang ni Mrs. Montero
- Basta't ikaw... Nanginginig Pa
- Asin at Paminta
- Matalino Man ang Matsing Naiisahan Din!
- Gusto Ko Nang Lumigaya
- Sugo ng Tondo
- Alas-Dose
- Tatarin
- Mahal Kita, Final Answer
- D' Uragons
- Gamian
- Operation Balikatan
- Cry No Fear

=== Television ===
Year	Title	Role
2000–2001	May Bukas Pa	Vivian Paredes
2000–2001	Kirara, Ano ang Kulay ng Pag-ibig?	Kirara
2001–2002	Ikaw Lang ang Mamahalin	Aravella
2015–2017	Doble Kara	Chloe Cabrera
2017–2018	Haplos	Minda Luciano Alonzo
2019	Hanggang sa Dulo ng Buhay Ko	Loida

== Discography ==
=== Studio albums ===
- Patricia Javier (2002)
- Reinvented (2006)
- Singles "Ngayong Paskong Ito" (2005)

== Personal life ==
Javier is married to American chiropractor Rob Walcher, and they have two sons. By 2017, she had returned to the Philippines with her family and resumed acting. In 2021, Javier and Walcher completed a naturopathy program, with GMA reporting that the graduation ceremony was held on 9 July at The Heritage Hotel Manila. Their son Robert Douglas Walcher IV won Mister Teen International 2023.
