= Chicago Mosaic School =

Coordinates: 41.955351°N 87.674764°W

The Chicago Mosaic School
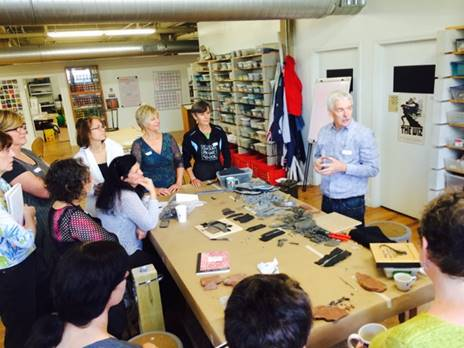
- Founder: Karen Ami
- Established: 2005
- Address: 1127 West Granville, Chicago, IL 60660
- Location: Chicago, IL
- Website: http://www.chicagomosaicschool.org/

The Chicago Mosaic School is a 501c(3) non-profit organization dedicated to advancing the fine art of mosaic and providing opportunities for comprehensive study with an academic, materially-oriented approach to art education. Since it was founded in 2005 by artist Karen Ami, the school remains one of the only mosaic fine arts schools outside of Europe, with classrooms, the Gallery of Contemporary Mosaics (GoCM), private artist studios and the CMS shoppe. The faculty is made up of a permanent teaching staff, as well as a visiting collection of international contemporary mosaic artists. The school has increased an awareness and appreciation for this ancient art form, and has created an open community for learning, sharing expertise, and developing the medium within the contemporary context. The Chicago Mosaic school is located in Chicago's Edgewater neighborhood on Granville Avenue.

== History ==
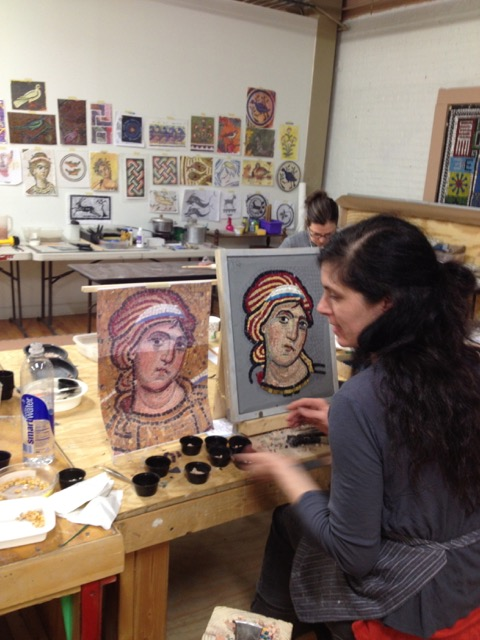

The Chicago Mosaic School was founded in early 2005 by artist Karen Ami, and it quickly became the premier center of education for Mosaic Arts in the United States. Before shifting her focus toward mosaics in her practice, Karen had a long career as a working artist in painting and ceramics, earning her BFA from the Boston Museum School and MFA from the School of the Art Institute of Chicago. In 1993, she took an interest in mosaics and found there were few resources in the United States for artists interested in a serious study of the medium. After several years of independent research and practice, she sought formal instruction in Italy. She connected with established and trained mosaic artists from around the world and invited them to come to Chicago to educate a new generation of students in the United States. Ami served as the president of the Society of American Mosaic Artists. With her background as a ceramicist and formulation in traditional mosaic technique, Ami was inspired by her love of mosaics to establish a hub for learning in Chicago, where expertise of ancient methodology and application could mingle with a contemporary perspective and aesthetic experimentation.

Starting as an intimate eight-person studio classroom in early 2000s, the school grew organically into a multifaceted organization offering over 150 classes and workshops a year to thousands of students. The school provides artists, teachers, and enthusiasts of all levels a place to explore all facets of the medium, from introductory courses for beginners to master workshops for those with an advanced fine art background. The school is well received by the community; it is known for a multitude of large public artworks.

The faculty has also grown from a single instructor to a team of fifteen, composed of year-round core and adjunct faculty and a robust visiting artist program and a new Artist in Residence program. The core instructors of CMS are professionally trained, practicing artists that provide instruction for all levels of student. The CMS Visiting Artists program brings some of the world's most influential contemporary mosaicists to Chicago from Italy, England, France, Scotland, Japan and Australia. The school preserves and promotes Mosaic Art through school programs, community partnerships, teacher training programs, and creating sustainable Mosaic Art for public or commercial spaces. It is an educational source for lectures, tours, demonstrations, and presentations from local, national, and international artists.

== Selected exhibitions ==
In 2010, the school presented an exhibition entitled Artifacts & Ideas For a Nature Inspired Architecture. Representing eight local artists as well as visiting California artist, James Hubbell, the exhibition included works in painting, sculpture, woodworking, mosaic, holography, stained glass and architectural concepts focused on the way man connects with the natural world.

In 2012, the school collaborated with the 47th Ward office of Chicago to produce Roots of Our Community, an art exhibit honoring the contributions made by senior citizens in the area. The same year, three members of the school faculty, Karen Ami, Matteo Randi and Sue Giannotti, took part in the Rencontres Internationales de Mosaique (International Mosaic Encounters) in Chartres, France. Another member of the Chicago Mosaic School's visiting faculty, Toyoharu Kii, was awarded an honorable mention.

In 2013, the school acquired 13,000 pounds of smalti glass left over from an installation in the cathedral basilica of Saint Louis.
