= Doble Kara =

2015 Filipino TV series or program

- Title card
- Also known as: Double Kara
- Genre: Melodrama; Romantic drama; Family drama; Suspense; Comedy; Black comedy
- Created by: Rondel P. Lindayag; Erick C. Salud
- Developed by: Roldeo T. Endrinal; Julie Anne R. Benitez
- Written by: Danica Mae S. Domingo; David Franche Diuco; Hazel Karyl Madanguit; Liendro Candelaria; Detrick Saberola
- Directed by: Emmanuel "Manny" Q. Palo; Jon S. Villarin; Erick C. Salud; Trina N. Dayrit; Jojo A. Saguin
- Starring: Julia Montes; Carmina Villarroel; Mylene Dizon; Ariel Rivera; Sam Milby; John Lapus; Edgar Allan Guzman; Maxene Magalona; Rayver Cruz
- Narrated by: Julia Montes (ending)
- Theme music composer: Vehnee Saturno
- Opening theme: "Ikaw Ay Ako" by Klarisse de Guzman and Morissette (seasons 1–6) "Ikaw Ay Ako" by Lyca Gairanod and Elha Nympha (seasons 4–6)
- Country of origin: Philippines
- Original language: Tagalog
- No. of seasons: 6
- No. of episodes: 381 (list of episodes)

Production
- Executive producers: Carlo L. Katigbak; Cory V. Vidanes; Laurenti M. Dyogi; Roldeo T. Endrinal; Hazel Bolisay-Parfan; Maya Manuel-Aralar
- Producer: Erick C. Salud
- Production locations: Pampanga, Philippines; Manila, Philippines; Nagoya, Japan
- Cinematography: Jafet Tutanes; Gerardo Jacinto
- Editor: Marion Bautista
- Running time: 30-45 minutes
- Production company: Dreamscape Entertainment Television

Original release
- Network: ABS-CBN
- Release: August 24, 2015 – February 10, 2017

Doble Kara (transl. double faced or twin faces) is a Philippine television drama series broadcast by ABS-CBN. Directed by Emmanuel Q. Palo, Jon S. Villarin, Erick C. Salud, Trina N. Dayrit and Jojo A. Saguin, it stars Julia Montes, Carmina Villarroel, Mylene Dizon, Ariel Rivera, Sam Milby, John Lapus, Edgar Allan Guzman, Maxene Magalona and Rayver Cruz. It aired on the network's Kapamilya Gold line up and worldwide on TFC from August 24, 2015, to February 10, 2017.

The series is streaming online on YouTube.

== Series overview ==
The story revolves around identical twin sisters who grew up in a happy family despite being poor and whose lives will be intertwined because of love, identity, deceit, ambition, and wealth when destiny teasingly compels to separate their lives.

Season	Episodes	Originally released	
Season	Episodes	First released	Last released
1	55	August 24, 2015	November 6, 2015
2	50	November 9, 2015	January 15, 2016
3	68	January 18, 2016	April 22, 2016
4	83	April 25, 2016	August 19, 2016
5	105	August 22, 2016	January 13, 2017
6	20	January 16, 2017	February 10, 2017

=== Season 1 (2015) ===
Identical twin sisters Kara and Sara are separated during their childhood when their parents, Laura and Ishmael give up Kara to the twins’ biological father, Antonio and his wife Lucille, in order for Kara to get the best medical care for her leukemia. Lucille thinks the child is adopted – unaware that the child is Antonio's biological daughter – then welcomes and loves Kara with all her heart. The couple brings Kara to America to have her treated for leukemia. Kara never forgets her real family and longs to reunite with them. Fourteen years later, Kara returns to her hometown and finds her family, while Sara pines for the life her twin enjoys. Antonio forbids Kara to reconnect with her family. Sara becomes romantically involved with Edward. Several situations occurs with Lucille and Antonio mistaking Sara for Kara, as Antonio is unaware that his biological daughter with Laura has a twin sister.

=== Season 2 (2015–16) ===
The truth of their parentage is revealed and rivalry arises with the twins fighting for their rights and ownership. But even so, Kara's love for her sister is unconditional as she gives in to Sara's wishes, even when she realizes her sister's evil intentions. Sara's personality becomes materialistic and scheming, as she persistently fights for her rights as the "legal daughter" of Antonio. This creates a rivalry between Sara and Lucille. Sara starts to covet for luxurious properties, desiring to outclass Kara and even induces Antonio to buy her own house to make up for all those years she suffered in poverty.

In addition to the conflict and turmoil of her two step daughters, Lucille discovers their family's secrets and her situation turns for the worst when she meets her half-siblings: Sebastian, and the conniving Alex.

=== Season 3 (2016) ===
Alex and Sebastian made a promise to get back the money which their father supposedly left for them. Alex would do everything to retrieve back what is rightfully theirs. Now, Lucille is against them as well until several circumstances will change their lives when Alex becomes even more desperate for money and she is determined to strike vengeance against Lucille. Eventually, Lucille turned the tables next to her favors when she started a connivance with Alex and assured to pay her handsomely in exchange for her services.

Sara is still hopeless to get back the money from Lucille since she already gave it to Alex. Sara catches Alex but she freely escaped from them but then she was kidnapped by a man ordered by Lucille. The day of confrontation in the court is about to come and Alex is ready to unveil the truth about what really happened to her. Afraid to tell the truth, Alex made a decision not to disclose what really happened to her. In exchange of her silence, Alex was rewarded by Lucille with wealth and money. Sara's dissatisfaction and envy arises again and before Kara and Seb's wedding, Sara seduces her sister's soon-to-be husband and once more begs for his love, but Seb proves that his love is only for Kara.

=== Season 4 (2016) ===
A deranged Lucille who keeps on seeing Antonio as an apparition continues with her agenda in ruining the Suarez and taking Kara back into her arms. Lucille, desperate to retrieve back her only daughter and sole memory of Antonio, committed a crime of arson and set the house of the Suarez on fire. She later pleaded guilty for the crimes she deliberately committed including the accident experienced by the Suarez family during their holiday vacation. Instead of imprisoning her, Lucille was placed in a mental hospital by the court, as she had developed late-onset schizophrenia. Hoping to find Edward, the father of her unborn child, Sara went to Japan, but failed miserably just as Chloe, believing that Sara would only bring her son misery and pain, led Sara astray and forced Edward to migrate in South Korea. Sara, with the help of a friend, decided to work and start her life anew in Japan for her baby instead.

Both babies are born, christened as Rebecca and Isabella. However, Sara mourned and grieved as Rebecca shortly died after her birth. After the misfortunes Sara had experienced in Japan, she went home to the Philippines, but chose not to return to her family, thinking that she'd only be a hindrance and be judged by her family because of her wrong decisions in life again. Not long after Isabella's few months, she was unfortunately separated from Kara and Seb which caused a problem for the Suarez family. Nobody knows who intended to kidnap the child and not stopping to search for her. Isabella was left in front of Sara's house under unknown circumstances and she took maternal care for her. Nowhere else to go, Sara was taken in by Cynthia in her Club Felicidad where Sara and Isabella spend over the following years.

=== Season 5 (2016–17) ===
One night during Becca's celebration for becoming part of Edward's commercial, Chloe, reveals the truth to Edward and the Suarez family. Alex pleased of what fate is doing to Sara, starts to be in triumph due to Sara's misery. Her plan is working when the secrets are revealed and the Suarezes will destroy themselves little by little, and Kara and Sara's relationship will be ruined forever. Kara finds out that Becca is actually her long-lost daughter, who was kidnapped many years ago.

After Sara was pleaded guilty for kidnapping Isabella, she escaped and tries to prove her innocence with the help of Lola Caring, Kengkay, Rona, and Nancy. She is later proven innocent and her relationship with Kara is fixed. The Suarezes then live a happy life without Alex's annoying deferral and evil schemes against them.

=== Season 6 (2017) ===
Three months later, Kara and Sara and the whole Suarez family is finally living in peace now that Alex is abroad. Sebastian continues to worry of Alex's state in spite of what she has done. Kara, who wants her family to move on, makes a rule that the whole Suarez family is forbidden to mention Alex's name, to avoid further complications. Meanwhile, Alex, who is currently in Malaysia, gives birth and starts her road to revenge against the Suarezes.

Banjo visits Sara and convinces her to go on a date with him one last time. As they get in the car, Sara notices and finds Alex. An outrageous chase happens and the two got into a wreck. Kara and Sebastian got informed and they send police men to arrest Alex. While waiting, Sara and Banjo have a heart-to-heart talk and finally confess their feelings for each other, while Banjo calls Cynthia and says his final goodbye. Sara escapes to seek help, but as the tragedy struck, the car falls into the gorge and explodes ending Banjo's life. Rebecca and Sara mourn for Banjo's death and, unfortunately, Cynthia blames Sara for Banjo's death and creates a scene at his wake, forcefully drags Sara out and blurting out ill thoughts against her. During Banjo's burial, Rebecca and Kara pay their respects for Banjo, while Sara begs for Cynthia's forgiveness. Also, after being confronted by Sara as a set up by Cynthia and accidentally shooting Seb in the head, Alex pretends to be deranged as part of her plan to escape jail and gets reunited with her half-sister Lucille in a mental institution, and uses Lucille as a tool to resume all of her evil schemes against Kara and Sara's family.

== Cast and characters ==
=== Main cast ===
- Julia Montes as Kara H. Dela Rosa-Acosta and Sara H. Suarez-Ligaya (seasons 1–6)
  - Jacqui Leus as the Acting double of Julia Montes
- Carmina Villarroel as Lucille Acosta-Dela Rosa (seasons 1–4, 6)
- Mylene Dizon as Laura Hipolito-Suarez
- Ariel Rivera as Ishmael Suarez (seasons 1–4)
- Sam Milby as Sebastian "Seb" Acosta (seasons 2–6)
- John Lapus as Pacito "Itoy" Delgado (seasons 1–4, supporting; seasons 5–6, main)
- Maxene Magalona as Alexandra "Alex" Acosta-Hernandez (seasons 2–4, guest; seasons 5–6, main)
- Edgar Allan Guzman as Edward C. Ligaya (seasons 1–4, supporting; seasons 5–6, main)
- Rayver Cruz as Banjo Manrique (season 4, guest; seasons 5–6, main)

=== Supporting cast ===
- Allen Dizon as Antonio Dela Rosa (seasons 1–4, supporting; season 6, special guest)
- Alicia Alonzo as Barbara Acosta
- Anjo Damiles as Andrew "Andy" Delgado
- Gloria Sevilla as Anita Valdicano (seasons 1–4)
- Krystal Mejes as Isabella D. Acosta / Rebecca "Becca" Suarez
- Myel De Leon as Hannah D. Acosta
- Mickey Ferriols as Cynthia "Mother" Manrique (season 4, guest; seasons 5–6, supporting)
- Patricia Javier as Chloe Cabrera (seasons 1–4, recurring; season 5, supporting)
- Alora Sasam as Camille Rose "CR" Sanchez
- Nash Aguas as Paolo Acosta (season 4, recurring; seasons 5–6, supporting)
- Alexa Ilacad as Patricia Hernandez (season 4, recurring; seasons 5–6, supporting)
- Polo Ravales as Julio Hernandez (season 4, guest; season 5, supporting)

=== Recurring cast ===
- Loren Burgos as Olivia Ou (seasons 1–3)
- Ramon Christopher as Cong. Dante Ligaya (season 1)
- Jay Chan Marquez as Greg Borromeo (season 3)
- Michael Conan as Emilio (seasons 1–3)
- Jason Fernandez as Jhayson (seasons 1–4)
- Crisha Uy as Jessica (seasons 1–4)
- Chiqui del Carmen as Lourdes (seasons 2–3)
- Joe Vargas as Elvis (seasons 2–6)
- Yesha Camile as Mikay (seasons 2–3)
- Amy Nobleza as Bebeng (seasons 2–3)
- Andrew Gan as Jeremy (seasons 4–5)
- Luis Hontiveros as Patrick (seasons 4–5)
- Joseph Ison as Gabo (seasons 5–6)
- Marx Topacio as Bogart (seasons 5–6)
- Jeff Luna as Adolfo (season 6)

=== Guest cast ===
- Dexie Daulat as Vianne Valera (season 1)
- Frances Makil-Ignacio as Susan Ligaya (season 1)
- Maila Gumila as Lorena Enriquez (season 2)
- David Chua as Nestor Castillo (seasons 3–4)
- Sunshine Garcia as Nancy Godinez (seasons 5–6)
- Maria Isabel Lopez as Rona "Mayora" Mallari (seasons 5–6)
- Kristel Fulgar as Kristine Mae "Kengkay" Dalisay (seasons 5–6)
- Odette Khan as Caridad "Lola Caring" Lacsamana (season 5)
- Simon Ibarra as SPO1 Leandro Arellano (seasons 5–6)
- Jhade Soberano as "Strawberry" (Season 4)

=== Special participation ===
Season 1

- Irma Adlawan as Esmeralda "Esme" Hipolito
- Avery Balasbas as young Kara and Sara
- Marco Pingol as young Edward
- Harvey Bautista as young Andy

Season 2

- Trajan Moreno as young Seb
- Alyanna Angeles as young Alex

== Production ==
=== Casting ===
After doing so many roles that are not normal for my age, I can really say that this is the most challenging project that has been given to me. I have to dedicate not only my heart and soul, but also myself as whole for this series.

— Lead actress Julia Montes on her dual roles

In April 2015, it was announced that Julia Montes had been given the first title role of the show. Hazel Parfan, the executive producer of the show, said they concocted the project with Montes in mind. Created as polar opposites, Montes had to change clothes, change makeup, and switch personas several times for her respective roles as Kara and Sara. Afterwards, more castings were confirmed, including Mylene Dizon, Ariel Rivera, Allen Dizon, Edgar Allan Guzman, John Lapus, Gloria Sevilla, Patricia Javier, and Alora Sasam. Bing Loyzaga and Enchong Dee were originally part of the main cast for the roles of Lucille Dela Rosa and Andy Delgado. They were later replaced by Carmina Villarroel and Anjo Damiles.

In November 2015, it was announced that Sam Milby and Maxene Magalona would also be joining the cast as one of Kara's (Montes) love interests and Sebastian's (Milby) sister, respectively. After the third-season finale, it was announced on April 22, 2016, that child actresses Krystal Mejes and Myel De Leon were cast in the second book and fourth season of the series as Isabella Acosta/Rebecca Suarez and Hannah Acosta, respectively. Rayver Cruz, Mickey Ferriols, recently transferred Kapamilya talent Polo Ravales, Nash Aguas and Alexa Ilacad joined the show with Cruz being a series regular.

=== Scheduling ===
The series was initially meant to be part of ABS-CBN's Primetime Bida evening block as announced on Bandila News broadcasting, declaring that Montes will be coming back on prime time. However, in a last minute change, the time slot was moved as part of Kapamilya Gold afternoon block, replacing Pinoy Big Brother: 737 GOLD, which is the schedule time after FlordeLiza and subsequently after It's Showtime.

=== Broadcast ===
Doble Kara aired on Mondays to Fridays at 3:15 p.m. Philippine Standard Time (PST). ABS-CBN pushed the series to an earlier time slot of 2:30 p.m. on August 31, 2015, right after FlordeLiza ended its series run. After this, the series was then again rescheduled to a later time slot of 3:30 p.m. on April 11, 2016.

The series had its world premiere on The Filipino Channel on August 25, 2015. In the Philippines, it premiered on ABS-CBN on August 24, 2015. The premiere also debuted via livestream on TFC's official online service, TFC.tv, and via its video on demand (Internet Protocol television) service available which is subtitled in English for its worldwide viewers from United States, Canada, Europe, Middle East, Australia, New Zealand, and Japan.

Doble Kara aired in Kenya on KTN from Monday to Friday during the 6-7 p.m. prime time slot. Throughout its run, it drew high viewership and acclaim. Following the successful run of Book 1 in 2017 and early 2018, the show made a return in June 2018 with the fourth season succeeding The Better Half, and reruns airing on Saturday evenings from 5 p.m.

In the rest of Africa, the show airs on StarTimes' Novela E1 at 7:50 p.m. Central Africa Time (CAT) every Saturday & Sundays following its premiere on May 28, 2016. In Indonesia, it premiered on MNCTV on January 23, 2017. In Kazakhstan, it premiered on its state television Qazaqstan on February 6, 2017, from Monday to Friday, with Kazakh voice translation and with Russian subtitles.

=== Music ===
Dreamscape Televisions of Love (Volume 1)

Soundtrack album by Various artists
- Released: September 26, 2015
- Recorded: 2015
- Genre: OPM
- Length: 42:03
- Label: Star Records

The theme song, "Ikaw Ay Ako" (You are Me), composed by songwriter Vehnee Saturno, was sung by The Voice of the Philippines runner-up Klarisse de Guzman and semifinalist Morissette. The song was originally composed for the television series Doble Kara. A second rendition of the song was covered by The Voice Kids grand champions Lyca Gairanod and Elha Nympha for the series' second book. The songs, from different Dreamscape Productions such as Ang Probinsyano's "Wag Ka Nang Umiyak" (Please Don't Cry Anymore) and "Basta't Kasama Kita", On the Wings of Love and And I Love You So's own title musics, and Nathaniel's "Lupa Man Ay Langit Na Rin" (Even the Earth is Also Heaven), were compiled into one album.

The soundtrack album was released by Star Records on September 26, 2015, during It's Showtime's Kapamilya Day, held at the Smart Araneta Coliseum.

Dreamscape Televisions of Love (Volume 1)
No.	Title	Writer(s)	Performer(s)	Length
1.	"Lupa Man Ay Langit Na Rin"	Vehnee Saturno	Erik Santos	5:00
2.	"On the Wings of Love"	Peter Schless and Jeffrey Osborne	Kyla	4:34
3.	"Wag Ka Nang Umiyak"	Ebe Dancel	Gary Valenciano	5:11
4.	"Ikaw Ay Ako"	Vehnee Saturno	Morissette and Klarisse de Guzman	4:06
5.	"Basta't Kasama Kita"	Greg Caro	Daryl Ong	4:30
6.	"And I Love You So"	Don McLean	Angeline Quinto	4:40
7.	"Wag Ka Nang Umiyak" (2015)	Ebe Dancel	KZ Tandingan	5:00
8.	"On the Wings of Love"	Peter Schless and Jeffrey Osborne	James Reid and Nadine Lustre	4:30
9.	"Basta't Kasama Kita"	Greg Caro	Coco Martin and Maja Salvador	3:32
Total length:				42:03

=== Marketing ===
On August 1, 2015, ABS-CBN released the first teaser (trailer) for the series on YouTube, featuring Montes. Another teaser followed on August 5, and once again featuring Montes. Later that month, ABS-CBN released a series of exclusive posters and cast portraits on the show's website and Twitter. On August 14, 2015, the first full-length trailer was released. On April 22, 2016, it was publicly disclosed by Julia Montes and Sam Milby in their promotion and interview that the series got renewed for another book and season because of its consistently increasing ratings which have been unprecedentedly high for an afternoon cable series, beating its rival program and a rumor surfaces that the series might get extended until August which will run for totally a year. The trailer for the second book shows the new life of Kara and Sara as mothers, having daughters of their own. On April 29, 2016, Montes, with Alora Sasam and Markki Stroem, visited SM City San Jose del Monte and served a thanksgiving concert to everyone who watches and supports the series. A promotion about the extension for the series was also included. There is also a report that the series might run until February 10, 2017, because of its continuous high ratings.

== Critical response ==
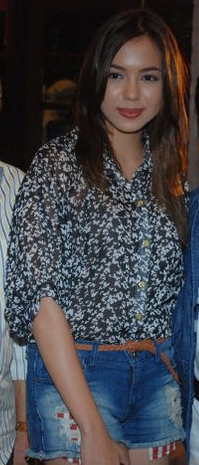
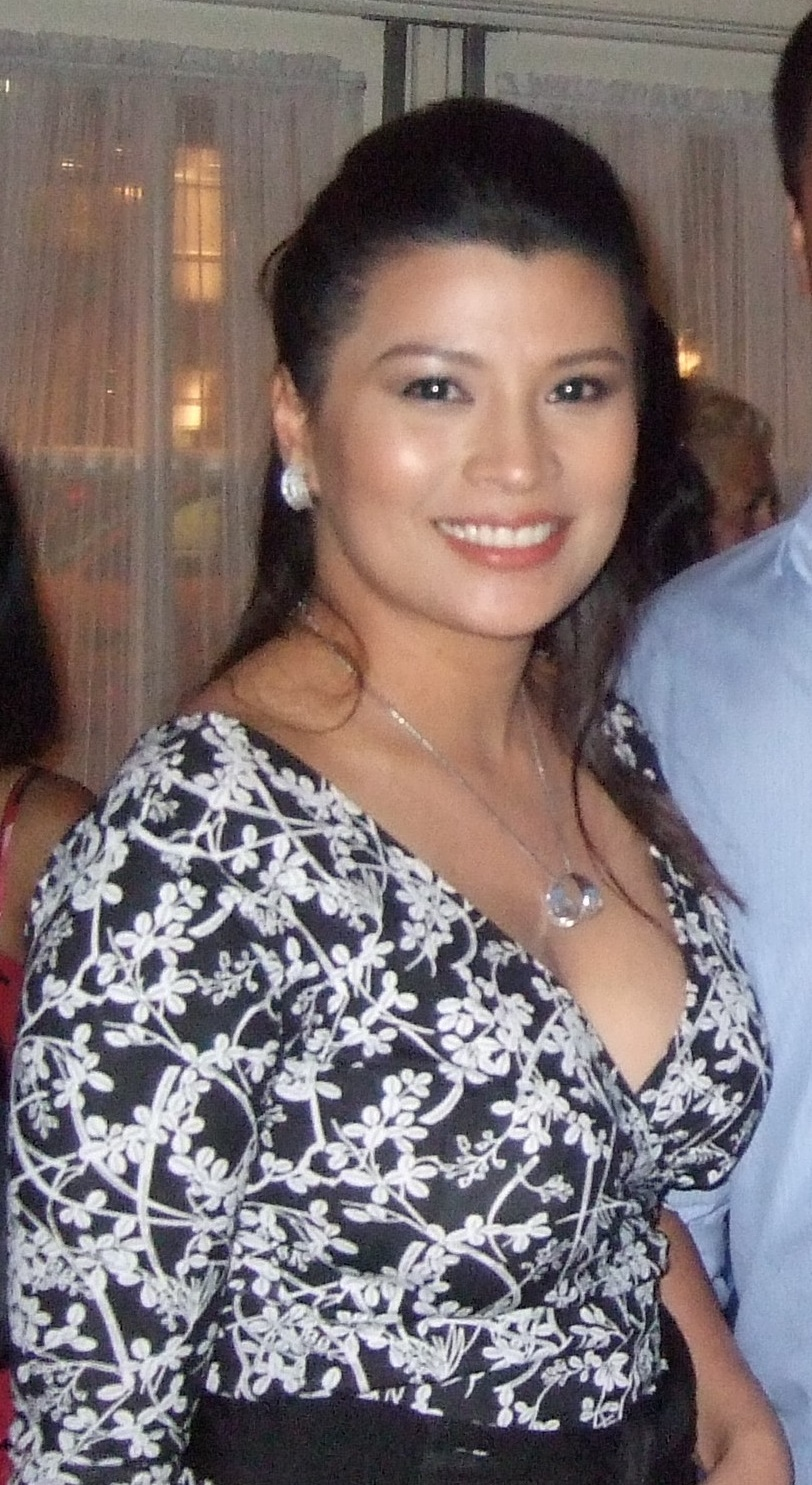
Both Montes (left) and Dizon (right) received critical acclaim for their performances.

Doble Kara has been met with largely positive reviews from critics since its premiere, with most praising Julia Montes' performance. Walden Sadiri M. Belen of Manila Bulletin praised Mylene Dizon's dramatic prowess during the episodes of its pilot week and the veteran actress' addition to the series, saying, "Mylene's acting, well-supported by the performances of seasoned actors Ariel Rivera and even Allen Dizon, beefed-up the first week run of Doble Kara. Although, Julia Montes would appear on the fifth episode, Mylene and her co-stars have already built the anticipation and eagerness of viewers to the next journey of the twins as adults. Anchored on Mylene's strong performances, Doble Kara is an afternoon soap opera filled with an ensemble cast that will succeed in luring viewers for weeks to come." Furthermore, Belen said that despite the long wait before Montes' grown-up characters appear, he can already feel the young actress' different range of acting, adding, "The first starring role of Julia Montes, Dreamscape Entertainment Television went all out to make the series a success. In the short scenes of Julia, viewers can already see the different range of acting she possesses. Playing the insipidly weak, California educated Kara and the ambitious beauty queen and commercial model Sara."

Luciano also commended Carmina Villarroel's performance and said that she also effectively grabs attention for her portrayal of Lucille, the ambiguous and struggling character who can either be adored because of her maternal love or sympathized for her growing need to seek justice. Elvin Luciano of PEP.ph finds the character of John Lapus's Itoy as "innovative", saying, "It's refreshing to see a character like Itoy, played with subtlety and control by Lapus, the gay kumare who is oftentimes the voice of discord and not there as the token comic relief." However, "praises also goes to the fine young discovery, Avery Balasbas, who convincingly plays two different people girls with both skill and maturity," stated by Luciano.

On the other hand, Rocky Chua of TV Series Craze gave a positive review, writing, "Julia can effectively portray both the bida and the kontrabida roles which makes the story of Doble Kara more interesting and exciting. It even leads in the afternoon teleserye lineup of the Kapamilya network. And yes, the story of it is unpredictable!" On an added note, he said, "Unique story, unexpected twists, and best performance of the lead cast, Julia Montes, who is playing bida and kontrabida at the same time, makes Doble Kara one of our favorite teleseryes today. Viewers were truly hook to it!"

In Africa, the series was a massive success. It received much applause from audiences and critics alike for the role of Montes particularly as Sara Suarez. Carmina Villarroel and Maxene Magalona were also praised for their respective portrayals as Lucille and Alex. It aired along with The Promise (2015), with many saying that it edged the remake. It star rocketed Montes as both a lead protagonist and antagonist.

== Ratings ==
Kantar Media National TV ratings (2:30PM PST / 3:15PM PST)
Pilot episode	Finale episode	Peak	Average	Source
16.9% (2:30PM PST)	22.2% (3:20PM PST)	22.2%	19.0% (August 2016)	

Doble Kara's premiere episode "Ang Simula" debuted on a high note on August 24, 2015, and scored a national TV rating of 16.9%, compared to its rival program in GMA's The Half Sisters which registered 15.6%, according to data from Kantar Media. Aside from winning the ratings game, Doble Kara also won the hearts of audiences as the #DobleKaraSimula quickly became a nationwide trending topic on Twitter because of the positive tweets posted by viewers about the show.

On April 12, 2016, Doble Kara received the highest national TV rating of 18.5% with its episode "Kara vs. Lucille – Part 2", placing 5th in the most watched program of that same day based on Kantar Media. On April 19, 2016, the series beat its previous all-time high rating, and garnered a national TV rating of 19.1% with its episode "Sakuna ng mga Suarez", placing 4th in the most watched program of that same day. On April 22, 2016, Doble Kara surpassed once again its previous all-time high rating and set a record for receiving the highest national TV rating of 19.3% with its season three finale, "Ang Kasal", placing 4th in the most watched program of that same day.

On May 24 and June 8, 2016, the second book and fourth season of the series conquered once again the afternoon programming and hit its new all-time high national TV ratings of 19.8% and 19.9% with its episodes "Hanap Isabella" and "May Kambal si Momma", respectively, as it won the hearts of the urban and rural viewers and sustained its lead over its rival shows. On June 9, 2016, the series beat its previous all-time high rating of 19.9% by setting a new record for receiving the highest national TV rating of 20.2% with its episode "Alex, Sisiraan si Sara", as it reached the 20% territory. On August 9, 2016, Doble Kara hits a new all-time high national TV rating of 20.3% with its episode "Wish ni Becca". On September 2, 2016, its previous record was replaced by its new all-time high national TV rating of 21.5% with its episode "Becca Tumakas", as it reached the 20% territory anew. On September 9, 2016, Doble Kara received a record-breaking and highest national TV rating of 21.7% with its episode "Si Becca ay si Isabella", placing 4th in the most watched program of that same day based on Kantar Media. On its sixth and last season's finale on February 10, 2017, Doble Kara broke its own record for receiving the highest national TV rating of 22.2% of any afternoon television series with its episode "Pagtatapos na Palaban", placing 5th in the most watched program of that day.

== Accolades ==
Year	Association	Category	Recipient(s) and nominee(s)	Result	Ref.
2015	6th TV Series Craze Awards	Best Daytime TV Series	Doble Kara	Won	
2016	14th Gawad Tanglaw Awards	Best Performance by an Actress (TV Series)	Julia Montes	Won	
2016	ALTA Media Icon Awards	Best Daytime Drama Series	Doble Kara	Won	
2016	30th PMPC Star Awards	Best Daytime Drama Series	Doble Kara	Won	
2016	30th PMPC Star Awards	Best Drama Actress	Julia Montes	Won	
2016	30th PMPC Star Awards	Best Drama Supporting Actress	Carmina Villarroel	Nominated	
2016	7th TV Series Craze Awards	Leading Lady of the Year	Julia Montes	Won	
2017	7th EdukCircle Awards	Best Actress for a Television Series	Julia Montes	Nominated	

== See also ==
- List of programs broadcast by ABS-CBN
- List of telenovelas of ABS-CBN
