= List of Doble Kara episodes =

Doble Kara (lit. 'Double Faced' / English: Double Kara) is a Philippine melodrama television series, directed by Emmanuel Q. Palo, Trina N. Dayrit, and Jojo A. Saguin, which premiered on ABS-CBN's Kapamilya Gold afternoon block and worldwide on The Filipino Channel on August 24, 2015 to February 10, 2017, starring Julia Montes. The series revolves around identical twin sisters, Kara and Sara, who grew up in a happy family in spite of being poor and whose lives will be intertwined because of love, identity, deceit, ambition, and wealth when destiny teasingly compels them separate their lives.

Episodes have been broadcast on Mondays to Fridays at 3:20 p.m. PHT, since Doble Kara's third season's second half and fourth season. The first three seasons aired after It's Showtime every weekday at 3:00 p.m. and 2:45 p.m. PHT time slot. All episodes are approximately thirty minutes, excluding commercials, and are broadcast in both high-definition and standard.

The first book initially had an order of two seasons, but ABS-CBN ordered an additional full season for the series' first book after the first few episodes of its two seasons aired and was the top series debut. On April 22, 2016, ABS-CBN announced that the show was renewed for a fourth season, introducing its second book. As of February 10, 2017, 381 episodes of Doble Kara have aired, concluding its series run.

== Series overview ==
Season	Episodes	Originally released	
Season	Episodes	First released	Last released
1	55	August 24, 2015	November 6, 2015
2	50	November 9, 2015	January 15, 2016
3	68	January 18, 2016	April 22, 2016
4	83	April 25, 2016	August 19, 2016
5	105	August 22, 2016	January 13, 2017
6	20	January 16, 2017	February 10, 2017

== Episodes ==
=== Book 1: Season 1 (2015) ===
No. overall	No. in season	Title	Twitter hashtag	Original air date	Kantar media rating (nationwide)
1	1	"Ang Simula" (The Beginning)	#DobleKaraSimula	August 24, 2015	16.9%
2	2	"Magpapalit" (Switch)	#DobleKaraMagpapalit	August 25, 2015	17.0%
3	3	"Peligro" (Risk)	#DobleKaraPeligro	August 26, 2015	15.4%
4	4	"Awayan" (Fight)	#DobleKaraAwayan	August 27, 2015	16.7%
5	5	"Hiwalayan" (Separation)	#DobleKaraHiwalayan	August 28, 2015	16.0%
6	6	"Bagong Pamilya" (New Family)	#DobleKaraBagongPamilya	August 31, 2015	16.7%
7	7	"Pagdating" (Arrival)	#DobleKaraPagdating	September 1, 2015	13.3%
8	8	"Ang Pagbabalik" (The Return)	#DobleKaraPagbabalik	September 2, 2015	14.9%
9	9	"Paglalapit" (Near Encounter)	#DobleKaraPaglalapit	September 3, 2015	13.6%
10	10	"Panganib" (Danger)	#DobleKaraPanganib	September 4, 2015	14.3%
11	11	"Hirap at Ginhawa" (Thick and Thin)	#DobleKaraHirapAtGinhawa	September 7, 2015	13.2%
12	12	"Paglilihim" (Conceal)	#DobleKaraPaglilihim	September 8, 2015	14.3%
13	13	"Napagkamalan" (Mistaken)	#DobleKaraNapagkamalan	September 9, 2015	13.9%
14	14	"Krus ng Landas" (Crossing of Path)	#DobleKaraKrusNgLandas	September 10, 2015	13.9%
15	15	"Pagkikita" (Encounter)	#DobleKaraPagkikita	September 11, 2015	15.2%
16	16	"Sikreto" (Secret)	#DobleKaraSikreto	September 14, 2015	14.8%
17	17	"Pakikisalamuha" (Bonding)	#DobleKaraBonding	September 15, 2015	16.0%
18	18	"Magpapalit" (Switch)	#DobleKaraMagpapalit	September 16, 2015	16.1%
19	19	"Pagpapanggap" (Disguise)	#DobleKaraPagpapanggap	September 17, 2015	17.5%
20	20	"Mag-aalala" (Concerned)	#DobleKaraMagaalala	September 18, 2015	17.1%
21	21	"Pagtatagpo" (Meeting)	#DobleKaraPagtatagpo	September 21, 2015	16.4%
22	22	"Kutob" (Presentiment)	#DobleKaraKutob	September 22, 2015	15.2%
23	23	"Tatakas" (Flee)	#DobleKaraTatakas	September 23, 2015	16.3%
24	24	"Inggit" (Envy)	#DobleKaraInggit	September 24, 2015	15.8%
25	25	"Pagtatakpan" (Cover Up)	#DobleKaraPagtatakpan	September 25, 2015	16.7%
26	26	"Kinagisnan" (Inborn)	#DobleKaraKinagisnan	September 28, 2015	15.7%
27	27	"Pagsugod" (Charge)	#DobleKaraPagsugod	September 29, 2015	15.3%
28	28	"Rebelasyon" (Revelation)	#DobleKaraRebelasyon	September 30, 2015	15.9%
29	29	"Unang Sampal" (First Slap)	#DobleKaraUnangSampal	October 1, 2015	15.5%
30	30	"Agawan" (Rivalry)	#DobleKaraAgawan	October 2, 2015	15.7%
31	31	"Pagsaway" (Disobey)	#DobleKaraPagsaway	October 5, 2015	15.4%
32	32	"Pinaplano" (Planned)	#DobleKaraPinaplano	October 6, 2015	16.0%
33	33	"Manggagaya" (Impersonator)	#DobleKaraManggagaya	October 7, 2015	14.6%
34	34	"Paniningil" (Reclaim)	#DobleKaraPaniningil	October 8, 2015	14.2%
35	35	"Ipapahamak" (Jeopardize)	#DobleKaraIpapahamak	October 9, 2015	15.1%
36	36	"Paglalantad" (Unfolding)	#DobleKaraPaglalantad	October 12, 2015	14.7%
37	37	"Aayain" (Invite)	#DobleKaraAayain	October 13, 2015	15.3%
38	38	"Harapan" (Face to Face)	#DobleKaraHarapan	October 14, 2015	14.9%
39	39	"Demandahan" (Prosecution)	#DobleKaraDemandahan	October 15, 2015	16.6%
40	40	"Nagdadalawang Isip" (Second Thoughts)	#DobleKaraNagdadalawangIsip	October 16, 2015	15.0%
41	41	"Sagasa" (Recklessness)	#DobleKaraSagasa	October 19, 2015	15.4%
42	42	"Pabida" (Heroic)	#DobleKaraPabida	October 20, 2015	13.3%
43	43	"Sorpresa" (Surprise)	#DobleKaraSorpresa	October 21, 2015	13.4%
44	44	"Engkwentro" (Conflict)	#DobleKaraEngkwentro	October 22, 2015	15.2%
45	45	"Huli Ka" (Caught)	#DobleKaraHuliKa	October 23, 2015	14.9%
46	46	"Babantaan" (Threaten)	#DobleKaraBabantaan	October 26, 2015	14.2%
47	47	"Amanos" (Even)	#DobleKaraAmanos	October 27, 2015	15.1%
48	48	"Lipat Bahay" (Back Home)	#DobleKaraLipatBahay	October 28, 2015	15.7%
49	49	"Hiwalay" (Breakup)	#DobleKaraBreakUp	October 29, 2015	15.0%
50	50	"Patibong" (Trap)	#DobleKaraPatibong	October 30, 2015	15.2%
51	51	"Bistado" (Exposed)	#DobleKaraBistado	November 2, 2015	16.2%
52	52	"Kabado" (Agitated)	#DobleKaraKabado	November 3, 2015	15.7%
53	53	"Akin Ka" (You're Mine)	#DobleKaraAkinKa	November 4, 2015	16.2%
54	54	"Makasarili" (Egoistic)	#DobleKaraMakasarili	November 5, 2015	16.0%
55	55	"Mapusok" (Aggressive)	#DobleKaraMapusok	November 6, 2015	15.6%

=== Book 1: Season 2 (2015–16) ===
No. overall	No. in season	Title	Twitter hashtag	Original air date	Kantar media rating (nationwide)
56	1	"Sebastian" (Sebastian)	#DobleKaraSebastian	November 9, 2015	15.4%
57	2	"Unang Pagkikita" (First Meet)	#DobleKaraFirstMeet	November 10, 2015	14.6%
58	3	"Pagsagip" (To the Rescue)	#DobleKaraToTheRescue	November 11, 2015	16.1%
59	4	"Abot Kamay" (Reach)	#DobleKaraAbotKamay	November 12, 2015	15.1%
60	5	"Katotohanan" (Truth)	#DobleKaraKatotohanan	November 13, 2015	15.3%
61	6	"Lantad" (Reveal)	#DobleKaraLantad	November 16, 2015	14.7%
62	7	"Pagdamay" (Sympathy)	#DobleKaraPagdamay	November 17, 2015	14.4%
63	8	"Pahirap" (Infliction)	#DobleKaraPahirap	November 18, 2015	14.0%
64	9	"Lagot Ka, Sara" (You're in Trouble, Sara)	#DobleKaraLagotKaSara	November 19, 2015	13.3%
65	10	"Walang Awa" (No Mercy)	#DobleKaraNoMercy	November 20, 2015	13.6%
66	11	"Sumbong" (Complaint)	#DobleKaraSumbong	November 23, 2015	13.4%
67	12	"Aresto" (Arrest)	#DobleKaraAresto	November 24, 2015	13.8%
68	13	"Kulong" (Shut-in)	#DobleKaraKulong	November 25, 2015	12.5%
69	14	"Linlang" (Fraud)	#DobleKaraLinlang	November 26, 2015	13.0%
70	15	"Sakripisyo" (Sacrifice)	#DobleKaraSakripisyo	November 27, 2015	13.8%
71	16	"Alipusta" (Insult)	#DobleKaraAlipusta	November 30, 2015	15.0%
72	17	"Materyosa" (Materialistic)	#DobleKaraMateryosa	December 1, 2015	14.2%
73	18	"Paglayo" (Detachment)	#DobleKaraPaglayo	December 2, 2015	13.9%
74	19	"Buhay Donya" (Luxurious Life)	#DobleKaraBuhayDonya	December 3, 2015	13.3%
75	20	"Sakim" (Greedy)	#DobleKaraSakim	December 4, 2015	13.2%
76	21	"Senyales" (Signs)	#DobleKaraSigns	December 7, 2015	14.3%
77	22	"Sugod, Sara" (Charge, Sara)	#DobleKaraSugodSara	December 8, 2015	14.9%
78	23	"Lapastangan" (Disrespectful)	#DobleKaraLapastangan	December 9, 2015	14.5%
79	24	"Pinalayas" (Evicted)	#DobleKaraPinalayas	December 10, 2015	13.1%
80	25	"Ganti" (Revenge)	#DobleKaraGanti	December 11, 2015	14.8%
81	26	"Pahirapan" (Torment)	#DobleKaraPahirapan	December 14, 2015	12.8%
82	27	"Ikatlong Senyales" (3rd Sign)	#DobleKara3rdSign	December 15, 2015	12.6%
83	28	"Laura vs. Lucille" (Laura vs. Lucille)	#DobleKaraLauraVsLucille	December 16, 2015	13.5%
84	29	"Donasyon" (Donation)	#DobleKaraDonation	December 17, 2015	12.6%
85	30	"Panganib" (Danger)	#DobleKaraPanganib	December 18, 2015	14.6%
86	31	"Trahedya" (Tragedy)	#DobleKaraTrahedya	December 21, 2015	13.9%
87	32	"Sisihan" (Blame)	#DobleKaraSisihan	December 22, 2015	13.8%
88	33	"Sulsol Alex" (Instigate Alex)	#DobleKaraSulsolAlex	December 23, 2015	13.4%
89	34	"Antonio, RIP" (Antonio, RIP)	#DobleKaraAntonioRIP	December 24, 2015	13.5%
90	35	"Pagtatanggi" (In Denial)	#DobleKaraInDenial	December 25, 2015	10.7%
91	36	"Dalamhati" (Grief)	#DobleKaraDalamhati	December 28, 2015	12.8%
92	37	"Paglimot" (Moving On)	#DobleKaraMovingOn	December 29, 2015	13.7%
93	38	"Udyok" (Impulse)	#DobleKaraUdyok	December 30, 2015	11.7%
94	39	"Ubos Pera" (Out of Money)	#DobleKaraUbosPera	December 31, 2015	11.0%
95	40	"Sadlak" (Trapped)	#DobleKaraSadlak	January 1, 2016	11.2%
96	41	"Salot" (Plague)	#DobleKaraSalot	January 4, 2016	14.1%
97	42	"Raket Pa, Sara" (More Sideline Businesses, Sara)	#DobleKaraRaketPaSara	January 5, 2016	12.6%
98	43	"Winner sa Beauty" (Winner in Beauty)	#DobleKaraWinnerSaBeauty	January 6, 2016	13.9%
99	44	"Demolisyon" (Demolition)	#DobleKaraDemolition	January 7, 2016	14.1%
100	45	"Manipulasyon" (Manipulation)	#DobleKaraManipulasyon	January 8, 2016	14.8%
101	46	"10 Milyon" (10 Million)	#DobleKara10Million	January 11, 2016	14.8%
102	47	"Pag-ibig ni Kara" (Kara Loves Seb)	#DobleKaraLovesSeb	January 12, 2016	13.4%
103	48	"Kampihan" (Taking Sides)	#DobleKaraKampihan	January 13, 2016	16.6%
104	49	"Away Kapatid" (Siblings' Dispute)	#DobleKaraAwayKapatid	January 14, 2016	15.7%
105	50	"Tapatan" (Upfront)	#DobleKaraTapatan	January 15, 2016	16.7%

=== Book 1: Season 3 (2016) ===
No. overall	No. in season	Title	Twitter hashtag	Original air date	Kantar media rating (nationwide)
106	1	"Puhunan" (Investment)	#DobleKaraInvestment	January 18, 2016	15.5%
107	2	"Kaibiganin si Sara" (Befriend Sara)	#DobleKaraBefriendSara	January 19, 2016	14.8%
108	3	"Carnap" (Carnapping)	#DobleKaraCarnap	January 20, 2016	14.7%
109	4	"Pakana ni Lucille" (Lucille's Agenda)	#DobleKaraPakanaNiLucille	January 21, 2016	14.9%
110	5	"Proyekto ni Sara" (Project Sara)	#DobleKaraProjectSara	January 22, 2016	14.8%
111	6	"Hinala" (Suspicion)	#DobleKaraHinala	January 25, 2016	15.8%
112	7	"Patibong" (Trap)	#DobleKaraPatibong	January 26, 2016	14.6%
113	8	"Pagtutuos" (Royal Rumble)	#DobleKaraRoyalRumble	January 27, 2016	16.7%
114	9	"Huli Ka, Alex" (You're Caught, Alex)	#DobleKaraHuliKaAlex	January 28, 2016	15.1%
115	10	"Mahusay Magkunwari" (The Great Pretender)	#DobleKaraTheGreatPretender	January 29, 2016	16.6%
116	11	"Sinugod si Lucille" (Lucille Got Assaulted)	#DobleKaraLucilleAttacked	February 1, 2016	15.7%
117	12	"Masamang Binabalak" (Evil Plan)	#DobleKaraEvilPlan	February 2, 2016	14.2%
118	13	"Pagbabanta" (Ultimatum)	#DobleKaraPagbabanta	February 3, 2016	15.0%
119	14	"Sabwatan" (Connivance)	#DobleKaraConnivance	February 4, 2016	14.9%
120	15	"Kara vs. Alex" (Kara vs. Alex)	#DobleKaraVsAlex	February 5, 2016	15.1%
121	16	"Panloloko" (Scam)	#DobleKaraScam	February 8, 2016	17.7%
122	17	"Sara, Muling Pinalayas" (Sara, Evicted Again)	#DobleKaraSaraEvictedAgain	February 9, 2016	15.8%
123	18	"Kawawang Sara" (Poor Sara)	#DobleKaraKawawaSara	February 10, 2016	15.7%
124	19	"Sara Inggetera" (Envious Sara)	#DobleKaraSaraInggetera	February 11, 2016	16.2%
125	20	"Sara, Nalinlang" (Sara Got Deceived)	#DobleKaraSaraNalinlang	February 12, 2016	17.0%
126	21	"Baliw-Baliwan" (Acting Deranged)	#DobleKaraBaliwBaliwan	February 15, 2016	16.5%
127	22	"Sara Alsa Balutan" (Sara Packs Up)	#DobleKaraSaraAlsaBalutan	February 16, 2016	16.4%
128	23	"Bistado" (Exposed)	#DobleKaraBistado	February 17, 2016	16.2%
129	24	"Karambola" (Collision)	#DobleKaraKarambola	February 18, 2016	16.6%
130	25	"Sara Ganid" (Avaricious Sara)	#DobleKaraSaraGanid	February 19, 2016	17.4%
131	26	"Pananakot" (Blackmail)	#DobleKaraBlackmail	February 22, 2016	16.8%
132	27	"30 Milyon" (30 Million)	#DobleKara30Million	February 23, 2016	17.2%
133	28	"Nawawala sa Eksena" (Missing in Action)	#DobleKaraMissingInAction	February 24, 2016	16.1%
134	29	"Sakitan" (Brawl)	#DobleKaraSakitan	February 25, 2016	18.4%
135	30	"Kulong" (Imprisoned)	#DobleKaraKulong	February 26, 2016	16.4%
136	31	"Walang Takas" (No Escape)	#DobleKaraWalangTakas	February 29, 2016	15.2%
137	32	"Hindi Inaasahang Tawag" (Unexpected Call)	#DobleKaraUnexpectedCall	March 1, 2016	16.1%
138	33	"Huli Ka, Sara" (You're Caught, Sara)	#DobleKaraHuliKaSara	March 2, 2016	16.5%
139	34	"Takas, Alex" (Escape, Alex)	#DobleKaraTakasAlex	March 3, 2016	14.5%
140	35	"Project Selos" (Jealousy)	#DobleKaraProjectSelos	March 4, 2016	16.1%
141	36	"Asungot" (Nuisance)	#DobleKaraAsungot	March 7, 2016	15.3%
142	37	"Paglilitis" (Hearing)	#DobleKaraHearing	March 8, 2016	14.5%
143	38	"Ang Testigo" (The Witness)	#DobleKaraTheWitness	March 9, 2016	16.1%
144	39	"Sarado Ang Kaso" (Case Closed)	#DobleKaraCaseClosed	March 10, 2016	15.4%
145	40	"Protesta Sara" (Sara Protests)	#DobleKaraProtestaSara	March 11, 2016	14.9%
146	41	"Sara Balik Selda" (Sara Goes to Jail Again)	#DobleKaraSaraBalikSelda	March 14, 2016	16.0%
147	42	"Sara vs. Alex" (Sara vs. Alex)	#DobleKaraSaraVsAlex	March 15, 2016	15.6%
148	43	"Magandang Balita" (Good News)	#DobleKaraGoodNews	March 16, 2016	16.0%
149	44	"Sara, Aakitin si Seb" (Sara Targets Seb)	#DobleKaraSaraTargetSeb	March 17, 2016	15.5%
150	45	"Halikan Mo Ako" (Kiss Me)	#DobleKaraKissMe	March 18, 2016	15.2%
151	46	"Bagsak Kumpanya" (Bankrupt Company)	#DobleKaraBagsakKumpanya	March 21, 2016	16.3%
152	47	"Anibersaryo ng Kasal" (Wedding Anniversary)	#DobleKaraWeddingAnniversary	March 22, 2016	16.1%
153	48	"Sorpresang Regalo" (Surprise Gifts)	#DobleKaraSurpriseGifts	March 23, 2016	15.8%
154	49	"Sara Estudyante" (Sara Student)	#DobleKaraSaraStudent	March 28, 2016	17.8%
155	50	"Sabwatan" (Connivance)	#DobleKaraSabwatan	March 29, 2016	17.4%
156	51	"Sabotahe" (Sabotage)	#DobleKaraSabotahe	March 30, 2016	16.6%
157	52	"Siraan" (Disgrace)	#DobleKaraSiraan	March 31, 2016	17.8%
158	53	"Panggulo" (Pest)	#DobleKaraPanggulo	April 1, 2016	16.8%
159	54	"Ispya sa Loob" (Inside Job)	#DobleKaraInsideJob	April 4, 2016	17.7%
160	55	"Utak ng Lahat" (Mastermind)	#DobleKaraMastermind	April 5, 2016	18.0%
161	56	"Buking" (Caught Red-Handed)	#DobleKaraBuking	April 6, 2016	17.0%
162	57	"Sara, Kuma-Kara" (Sara Imitates Kara)	#DobleKaraSaraKumaKara	April 7, 2016	18.4%
163	58	"Akitin" (Seduce)	#DobleKaraAkitin	April 8, 2016	16.2%
164	59	"Huli Kayo" (You're Caught)	#DobleKaraHuliKayo	April 11, 2016	17.4%
165	60	"Kara vs. Lucille – Part 2" (Kara vs. Lucille Part 2)	#DobleKaraVsLucillePart2	April 12, 2016	18.5%
166	61	"Halik ni Sara" (Sara's Kiss)	#DobleKaraHalikNiSara	April 13, 2016	17.3%
167	62	"Multo ni Antonio" (Antonio's Ghost)	#DobleKaraMultoNiAntonio	April 14, 2016	17.2%
168	63	"Guniguni" (Hallucination)	#DobleKaraHallucination	April 15, 2016	17.8%
169	64	"Boyfie ni Sara" (Sara's Boyfriend)	#DobleKaraSaraBoyfie	April 18, 2016	17.0%
170	65	"Sakuna ng mga Suarez" (Suarez Accident)	#DobleKaraSuarezAccident	April 19, 2016	19.1%
171	66	"Pag-alok ng Kasal" (Proposal)	#DobleKaraProposal	April 20, 2016	17.1%
172	67	"Banta kay Seb" (Threat Against Seb)	#DobleKaraBantaKaySeb	April 21, 2016	17.0%
173	68	"Ang Kasal" (The Wedding)	#DobleKaraTheWedding	April 22, 2016	19.3%

=== Book 2: Season 4 (2016) ===
No. overall	No. in season	Title	Twitter hashtag	Original air date	Kantar media rating (nationwide)
174	1	"Tuloy Ang Kasal" (The Wedding Proceeds)	#DobleKaraTuloyAngKasal	April 25, 2016	18.0%
175	2	"Pulot-gata" (Honeymoon)	#DobleKaraHoneymoon	April 26, 2016	17.7%
176	3	"Bomba" (Bomb)	#DobleKaraBomba	April 27, 2016	17.2%
177	4	"Nagdadalang-tao" (Preggy)	#DobleKaraPreggy	April 28, 2016	17.3%
178	5	"Doble Buntis" (Dual Pregnancy)	#DobleKaraDobleBuntis	April 29, 2016	15.7%
179	6	"Sara Lugmok" (Prostrated Sara)	#DobleKaraSaraLugmok	May 2, 2016	17.0%
180	7	"Kidnap" (Abduct)	#DKKidnap	May 3, 2016	17.7%
181	8	"Lagot Ka, Lucille" (You're in Trouble, Lucille)	#DKLagotKaLucille	May 4, 2016	18.4%
182	9	"Sunog Bahay" (Arson)	#DKSunogBahay	May 5, 2016	18.2%
183	10	"Walang Takas" (No Escape)	#DKWalangTakas	May 6, 2016	18.8%
184	11	"Lucille sa Mental" (Lucille in the Asylum)	#DKLucilleSaMental	May 10, 2016	17.8%
185	12	"Taktika" (Tactic)	#DKTaktika	May 11, 2016	18.0%
186	13	"Puslit" (Sneak)	#DKPuslit	May 12, 2016	19.0%
187	14	"Sara, Pupunta sa Japan" (Sara Goes to Japan)	#DKSaraGoesToJapan	May 13, 2016	17.3%
188	15	"Sapalaran" (Audacity)	#DKSapalaran	May 16, 2016	18.5%
189	16	"Baby Rebecca" (Baby Rebecca)	#DKBabyRebecca	May 17, 2016	18.0%
190	17	"Baby Isabella" (Baby Isabella)	#DKBabyIsabella	May 18, 2016	18.2%
191	18	"Paalam, Rebecca" (Farewell, Rebecca)	#DKPaalamRebecca	May 19, 2016	18.4%
192	19	"Kidnap" (Abduct)	#DKKidnap	May 20, 2016	17.1%
193	20	"Nasaan si Isabella?" (Where is Isabella?)	#DKNasaanSiIsabella	May 23, 2016	19.3%
194	21	"Hanap Isabella" (Looking for Isabella)	#DKHanapIsabella	May 24, 2016	19.8%
195	22	"Si Isabella ay si Rebecca" (Isabella is Rebecca)	#DKIsabellaIsRebecca	May 25, 2016	16.7%
196	23	"Club Felicidad" (Club of Happiness)	#DKClubFelicidad	May 26, 2016	18.7%
197	24	"Hannah at Becca" (Hannah and Becca)	#DKHannahAtBecca	May 27, 2016	17.4%
198	25	"Poppa Banjo" (Papa Banjo)	#DKPoppaBanjo	May 30, 2016	18.0%
199	26	"Maling Akala" (False Alarm)	#DKFalseAlarm	May 31, 2016	17.1%
200	27	"Aso't Pusa" (Squabble)	#DKAsotPusa	June 1, 2016	18.0%
201	28	"Pag-ampon" (Adoption)	#DKAdoption	June 2, 2016	16.5%
202	29	"Nanay at Tatay" (Mommy and Daddy)	#DKNanayAtTatay	June 3, 2016	15.0%
203	30	"Seb at Becca" (Seb and Becca)	#DKSebAndBecca	June 6, 2016	17.3%
204	31	"Kara at Becca" (Kara and Becca)	#DKKaraAndBecca	June 7, 2016	19.0%
205	32	"May Kambal si Momma" (Momma Has a Twin Sister)	#DKMayKambalsiMomma	June 8, 2016	19.9%
206	33	"Alex, Sisiraan si Sara" (Alex Besmirches Sara)	#DKAlexSiraanSara	June 9, 2016	20.2%
207	34	"Magkapiling Muli" (Reunited)	#DKReunited	June 10, 2016	19.3%
208	35	"Ang Plano ni Alex" (Alex's Master Plan)	#DKAlexMasterPlan	June 13, 2016	15.6%
209	36	"Maligayang Pagbabalik, Sara" (Welcome Back, Sara)	#DKWelcomeBackSara	June 14, 2016	17.0%
210	37	"Dagok" (Wallop)	#DKDagok	June 15, 2016	17.1%
211	38	"Dalamhati" (Lamentation)	#DKDalamhati	June 16, 2016	16.8%
212	39	"Paalam, Ishmael" (Farewell, Ishmael)	#DKPaalamIshmael	June 17, 2016	16.8%
213	40	"Si Alex Ang Salarin" (Alex Suspect)	#DKAlexSuspect	June 20, 2016	14.6%
214	41	"Ahas sa Pamilya" (A Judas in the Family)	#DKAhasSaPamilya	June 21, 2016	16.8%
215	42	"Maling Akala" (False Alarm)	#DKMalingAkala	June 22, 2016	15.7%
216	43	"Sanib Pwersa" (Join Forces)	#DKSanibPwersa	June 23, 2016	16.2%
217	44	"Kampihan" (Taking Sides)	#DKKampihan	June 24, 2016	16.2%
218	45	"Away Bati" (Fight and Reconciliation)	#DKAwayBati	June 27, 2016	17.3%
219	46	"Poppa Edward" (Papa Edward)	#DKPoppaEdward	June 28, 2016	16.5%
220	47	"Gaya Gaya" (Emulator)	#DKGayaGaya	June 29, 2016	16.5%
221	48	"Away Bata" (Children's Fight)	#DKAwayBata	June 30, 2016	18.3%
222	49	"Mabuting Ina" (Good Mother)	#DKMabutingIna	July 1, 2016	16.9%
223	50	"Paglusob" (Raid)	#DKRaid	July 4, 2016	17.8%
224	51	"Sara Balik Kulungan" (Sara Goes to Prison Again)	#DKSaraBalikKulungan	July 5, 2016	17.1%
225	52	"Pangungulila" (Bereavement)	#DKPangungulila	July 6, 2016	19.2%
226	53	"Sara Napaaway" (Sara Got Into a Fight)	#DKSaraNapaaway	July 7, 2016	18.9%
227	54	"Unsyaming Paglaya" (Not Released From Prison)	#DKUnsyamingPaglaya	July 8, 2016	17.6%
228	55	"Tita Momma" (Aunt Momma)	#DKTitaMomma	July 11, 2016	19.0%
229	56	"Takot Maagaw" (Spoiled Fear)	#DKTakotMaagaw	July 12, 2016	16.6%
230	57	"Pagtayo Bilang Ama" (Father Figure)	#DKFatherFigure	July 13, 2016	18.6%
231	58	"Isabella" (Isabella)	#DKIsabella	July 14, 2016	18.4%
232	59	"Artista" (Actress)	#DKArtista	July 15, 2016	19.1%
233	60	"Panlilinlang" (Deceit)	#DKPanlilinlang	July 18, 2016	17.6%
234	61	"Araw ng Parangal" (Recognition Day)	#DKRecognitionDay	July 19, 2016	16.8%
235	62	"Unang Patibong" (First Trap)	#DKUnangPatibong	July 20, 2016	18.8%
236	63	"Lampin" (Embroidered Napkin)	#DKLampin	July 21, 2016	17.9%
237	64	"5 Milyon" (5 Million)	#DK5Million	July 22, 2016	18.3%
238	65	"Banta ni Chloe" (Chloe's Threat)	#DKBantaNiChloe	July 26, 2016	17.9%
239	66	"Bigong Pagtangka" (Failed Attempt)	#DKFailedAttempt	July 27, 2016	19.0%
240	67	"Isang Pamilya" (One Family)	#DKIsangPamilya	July 28, 2016	19.2%
241	68	"Pinaako" (Hinted Again)	#DKPinaako	July 29, 2016	19.3%
242	69	"Becca Nilalayo" (Depriving Becca)	#DKBeccaNilalayo	August 1, 2016	19.9%
243	70	"Si Edward si Poppa" (Edward is Poppa)	#DKSiEdwardSiPoppa	August 2, 2016	18.7%
244	71	"Kasinungalingan" (Artifice)	#DKKasinungalingan	August 3, 2016	17.5%
245	72	"Litrato ni Isabella" (Isabella's Picture)	#DKIsabellaPicture	August 4, 2016	18.5%
246	73	"Lola Chloe" (Grandma Chloe)	#DKLolaChloe	August 5, 2016	18.6%
247	74	"Asa Pa, Sara" (You Wish, Sara)	#DKAsaPaSara	August 8, 2016	19.6%
248	75	"Wish ni Becca" (Becca's Wish)	#DKWishNiBecca	August 9, 2016	20.3%
249	76	"Birthday ni Alex" (Alex's Birthday)	#DKBirthdayNiAlex	August 10, 2016	19.9%
250	77	"Duda kay Alex" (Doubt With Alex)	#DKDudaKayAlex	August 11, 2016	19.2%
251	78	"Suspetya" (Circumspection)	#DKSuspetya	August 12, 2016	19.8%
252	79	"Tulak ni Hanna" (Hanna's Fault)	#DKTulakNiHanna	August 15, 2016	20.0%
253	80	"Uri ng Dugo" (Blood Type)	#DKBloodType	August 16, 2016	18.1%
254	81	"Gagamitin sa DNA" (DNA Sample)	#DKDNASample	August 17, 2016	17.2%
255	82	"Paglunsad ng Pagtitipon" (Launch Party)	#DKLaunchParty	August 18, 2016	17.7%
256	83	"Ang Katotohanan" (The Truth)	#DKAngKatotohanan	August 19, 2016	19.4%

=== Book 2: Season 5 (2016–17) ===
No. overall	No. in season	Title	Twitter Hashtag	Original air date	Kantar media rating (nationwide)
257	1	"Magsinungaling Ka Ulit, Sara" (Lie Again, Sara)	#DKLieAgainSara	August 22, 2016	19.4%
258	2	"Andrea Nagbabalik" (Andrea Returns)	#DKAndreaNagbabalik	August 23, 2016	18.6%
259	3	"Sara Lalayo" (Sara Strays Away)	#DKSaraLalayo	August 24, 2016	18.9%
260	4	"Manman" (Spy)	#DKManman	August 25, 2016	18.7%
261	5	"Dokumento sa Japan" (Japan Document)	#DKJapanDocument	August 26, 2016	18.9%
262	6	"Patibong 2" (Trap Number 2)	#DKPatibong2	August 29, 2016	19.4%
263	7	"Becca Ampon" (Adopted Becca)	#DKBeccaAmpon	August 30, 2016	19.8%
264	8	"Banjo Nagtapat" (Banjo Confesses)	#DKBanjoNagtapat	August 31, 2016	18.8%
265	9	"Parehong Ampon" (Both Adopted)	#DKParehongAmpon	September 1, 2016	18.9%
266	10	"Becca Tumakas" (Becca Runs Away)	#DKBeccaTumakas	September 2, 2016	21.5%
267	11	"Parehong Sakit" (Same Illness)	#DKParehongSakit	September 5, 2016	18.1%
268	12	"Pagsuri ng DNA ni Seb" (Paternity Test)	#DKPaternityTest	September 6, 2016	18.2%
269	13	"Balak Lumayo" (Plans to Leave)	#DKBalakLumayo	September 7, 2016	18.6%
270	14	"Resulta ng DNA" (DNA Result)	#DKDNAResult	September 8, 2016	20.2%
271	15	"Si Becca ay si Isabella" (Becca is Isabella)	#DKBeccaIsIsabella	September 9, 2016	21.7%
272	16	"Unang Yakap" (First Hug)	#DKUnangYakap	September 12, 2016	19.9%
273	17	"Pansamantalang Laya" (Temporary Freedom)	#DKPansamantalangLaya	September 13, 2016	19.6%
274	18	"Dalawang Ina" (Two Mothers)	#DKDalawangIna	September 14, 2016	19.6%
275	19	"Ikaw si Isabella" (You are Isabella)	#DKIkawSiIsabella	September 15, 2016	18.4%
276	20	"Hinagpis" (Resentment)	#DKHinagpis	September 16, 2016	18.1%
277	21	"Ako si Becca" (I Am Becca)	#DKAkoSiBecca	September 19, 2016	16.8%
278	22	"Paalam, Becca" (Farewell, Becca)	#DKPaalamBecca	September 20, 2016	14.4%
279	23	"Lapitan" (Reach Out)	#DKReachOut	September 21, 2016	16.5%
280	24	"Pang-Ipit" (Pin)	#DKPin	September 22, 2016	17.6%
281	25	"Hannah Inggitera" (Envious Hannah)	#DKHannahInggitera	September 23, 2016	17.8%
282	26	"Magkasama Muli" (Together Again)	#DKTogetherAgain	September 26, 2016	18.0%
283	27	"Huli Ka, Alex" (You're Caught, Alex)	#DKHuliKaAlex	September 27, 2016	17.8%
284	28	"Asan Si Momma?" (Where is Momma?)	#DKAsanSiMomma	September 28, 2016	18.1%
285	29	"Layas Alex" (Alex Runs Away From Home)	#DKLayasAlex	September 29, 2016	20.0%
286	30	"Sumbungera" (Crybaby)	#DKSumbungera	September 30, 2016	18.4%
287	31	"Nars" (Nurse)	#DKNurse	October 3, 2016	17.7%
288	32	"Si Sara Po" (It was Sara)	#DKSiSaraPo	October 4, 2016	17.6%
289	33	"Utak ng Lahat" (Mastermind)	#DKMastermind	October 5, 2016	19.1%
290	34	"Nahadlangan" (Thwarted)	#DKNahadlangan	October 6, 2016	16.1%
291	35	"Silip kay Becca" (Peek on Becca)	#DKSilipKayBecca	October 7, 2016	17.1%
292	36	"Ayaw ni Hanna" (Hanna Loathes)	#DKAyawNiHanna	October 10, 2016	16.2%
293	37	"Walang Lusot" (No Loophole)	#DKWalangLusot	October 11, 2016	16.9%
294	38	"Becca Tumestigo" (Becca Testifies)	#DKBeccaTumestigo	October 12, 2016	18.1%
295	39	"Pakiusap ni Laura" (Laura's Request)	#DKPakiusapNiLaura	October 13, 2016	18.8%
296	40	"Ang Hatol" (The Judgement)	#DKAngHatol	October 14, 2016	17.4%
297	41	"Bagong Mundo" (New World)	#DKBagongMundo	October 17, 2016	17.5%
298	42	"Mangibang Bansa" (Abroad)	#DKMangibangBansa	October 18, 2016	17.8%
299	43	"Tawag ni Sara" (Sara's Call)	#DKTawagNiSara	October 19, 2016	17.8%
300	44	"Nagparaya" (Letting Go)	#DKNagparaya	October 20, 2016	17.4%
301	45	"Alok na Takas" (Offer to Escape)	#DKAlokNaTakas	October 21, 2016	16.2%
302	46	"Antay Kay Momma" (Waiting for Momma)	#DKAntayKayMomma	October 24, 2016	16.2%
303	47	"Baril ni Julio" (Julio's Pistol)	#DKBarilNiJulio	October 25, 2016	17.1%
304	48	"Pinipilit" (Forcing)	#DKPinipilit	October 26, 2016	16.6%
305	49	"Naudlot" (Postponed)	#DKNaudlot	October 27, 2016	17.2%
306	50	"Araw ng Pamilya" (Family Day)	#DKFamilyDay	October 28, 2016	17.2%
307	51	"Punta Amerika" (Off to America)	#DKPuntaAmerika	October 31, 2016	15.2%
308	52	"Hanap Becca" (Looking for Becca)	#DKHanapBecca	November 1, 2016	14.3%
309	53	"Nanay" (Mother)	#DKNanay	November 2, 2016	17.2%
310	54	"Nagpapaubaya" (Relinquish)	#DKNagpapaubaya	November 3, 2016	17.6%
311	55	"Sara Lumaban" (Sara Fights)	#DKSaraLumaban	November 4, 2016	17.6%
312	56	"Sara Wagi" (Sara Wins)	#DKSaraWagi	November 7, 2016	17.3%
313	57	"Alex vs. Barbara" (Alex vs. Barbara)	#DKAlexVsBarbara	November 8, 2016	16.6%
314	58	"Malaking Plano" (Big Plan)	#DKMalakingPlano	November 9, 2016	16.2%
315	59	"Takas" (Escape)	#DKTakas	November 10, 2016	15.5%
316	60	"Lagot Ka, Alex" (You're in Trouble, Alex)	#DKLagotKaAlex	November 11, 2016	15.9%
317	61	"Pagpapanggap" (Disguise)	#DKDisguise	November 14, 2016	16.9%
318	62	"Pasaporte" (Passport)	#DKPassport	November 15, 2016	17.0%
319	63	"Takbo, Sara" (Run, Sara)	#DKTakboSara	November 16, 2016	17.2%
320	64	"Paghaharap" (Confrontation)	#DKPaghaharap	November 17, 2016	18.1%
321	65	"Sara vs. Alex" (Sara vs. Alex)	#DKSaraVsAlex	November 18, 2016	16.9%
322	66	"Pagtatagpo" (Rendezvous)	#DKPagtatagpo	November 21, 2016	16.7%
323	67	"Sige, Takas Pa, Sara" (Flee Again, Sara)	#DKSigeSaraTakasPa	November 22, 2016	19.0%
324	68	"Ligtas si Sara" (Sara is Safe)	#DKLigtasSiSara	November 23, 2016	16.7%
325	69	"Alex Praning" (Paranoid Alex)	#DKAlexPraning	November 24, 2016	16.9%
326	70	"Aalis Na" (Departure)	#DKAalisNa	November 25, 2016	17.6%
327	71	"Makita Kang Muli" (See You Again)	#DKMakitaKangMuli	November 28, 2016	15.4%
328	72	"Nakidnap Ulit" (Abducted Again)	#DKNakidnapUlit	November 29, 2016	14.4%
329	73	"Patibong ni Alex" (Snares Of Alex)	#DKPatibongNiAlex	November 30, 2016	16.9%
330	74	"Mas Matimbang" (More Important)	#DKMasMatimbang	December 1, 2016	17.8%
331	75	"Suspetsa kay Alex" (Dubiety on Alex)	#DKSuspetsaKayAlex	December 2, 2016	15.5%
332	76	"Nabuliyaso" (Thwarted)	#DKNabulilyaso	December 5, 2016	16.1%
333	77	"Kara Aaksyon" (Kara in Action)	#DKKaraAaksyon	December 6, 2016	16.9%
334	78	"Kasunduan" (Agreement)	#DKKasunduan	December 7, 2016	16.9%
335	79	"Buhay si Dina" (Dina is Alive)	#DKBuhaySiDina	December 8, 2016	17.1%
336	80	"Magkakilala" (Acquaintance)	#DKMagkakilala	December 9, 2016	17.3%
337	81	"Natukoy" (Mentioned)	#DKNatukoy	December 12, 2016	16.9%
338	82	"Alisin sa Landas" (Remove from Path)	#DKAlisinSaLandas	December 13, 2016	18.2%
339	83	"Pursigido" (Determined)	#DKPursigido	December 14, 2016	19.3%
340	84	"Mahuhuli Na" (Nearly Caught)	#DKMahuhuliNa	December 15, 2016	17.8%
341	85	"Umamin" (Admitted)	#DKUmamin	December 16, 2016	19.0%
342	86	"Mapapalaya" (Freed)	#DKMapapalaya	December 19, 2016	17.4%
343	87	"Pagpapatawad" (Forgiveness)	#DKPagpapatawad	December 20, 2016	17.3%
344	88	"Sara Sumuko" (Sara Surrenders)	#DKSaraSumuko	December 21, 2016	17.3%
345	89	"Kapatid sa Labas" (Half Sister)	#DKHalfSister	December 22, 2016	17.2%
346	90	"Paglilitis" (Hearing)	#DKPaglilitis	December 23, 2016	17.0%
347	91	"Laya Na" (Loosed Out)	#DKFree	December 26, 2016	14.5%
348	92	"Masayang Pamilya" (Happy Family)	#DKHappyFamily	December 27, 2016	14.8%
349	93	"Hanap Ebidensya" (Looking for Evidence)	#DKHanapEbidensya	December 28, 2016	14.6%
350	94	"Lagot Kayo" (You're in Trouble)	#DKLagotKayo	December 29, 2016	14.9%
351	95	"Wala ng Kawala" (There Is No Escape)	#DKWalaNgKawala	December 30, 2016	14.0%
352	96	"Mabilisang Kasal" (Quick Wedding)	#DKMabilisangKasal	January 2, 2017	15.2%
353	97	"Nakaisa" (Outwitted)	#DKNakaisa	January 3, 2017	15.7%
354	98	"Kapayapaan" (World Peace)	#DKWorldPeace	January 4, 2017	15.3%
355	99	"Takas, Julio" (Run For Your Life, Julio)	#DKTakasJulio	January 5, 2017	18.5%
356	100	"Paghihiganti" (Retribution)	#DKPaghihiganti	January 6, 2017	18.0%
357	101	"Palaban" (Fighter)	#DKPalaban	January 9, 2017	16.9%
358	102	"CCTV Footage" (CCTV Footage)	#DKCCTVFootage	January 10, 2017	17.4%
359	103	"Para kay Sara" (For Sara)	#DKParaKaySara	January 11, 2017	19.7%
360	104	"Alex Tatakas" (Alex Tries To Run Away)	#DKAlexTatakas	January 12, 2017	19.6%
361	105	"Bigong Pag-ibig" (Despondency)	#DKBigongPagibig	January 13, 2017	17.9%

=== Book 2: Season 6 (2017) ===
No. overall	No. in season	Title	Twitter Hashtag	Original air date	Kantar media rating (nationwide)
362	1	"Sinabotahe" (Sabotaged)	#DKSinabotahe	January 16, 2017	17.4%
363	2	"Pabagsakin" (Dethronement)	#DKPabagsakin	January 17, 2017	17.3%
364	3	"Bangin ng Kamatayan" (The Abyss Of Death)	#DKBanginNgKamatayan	January 18, 2017	17.1%
365	4	"Paalam, Banjo" (Farewell, Banjo)	#DKPaalamBanjo	January 19, 2017	17.1%
366	5	"Lagot Ka, Sara" (You're in Trouble, Sara)	#DKLagotKaSara	January 20, 2017	17.0%
367	6	"Agaw-buhay" (Hovering Between Life and Death)	#DKAgawBuhay	January 23, 2017	17.7%
368	7	"Anak ni Alex" (Alex's Child)	#DKAnakNiAlex	January 24, 2017	17.2%
369	8	"Pumatay kay Ishmael" (The Killer Of Ishmael)	#DKPumatayKayIsmael	January 25, 2017	17.3%
370	9	"Ang Pagbabalik ni Lucille" (Lucille is Back)	#DKLucilleIsBack	January 26, 2017	17.5%
371	10	"Sino Ang Baliw?" (Who Is Not In One's Right Mind? )	#DKSinoAngBaliw	January 27, 2017	17.8%
372	11	"Pagtakas" (Decampment)	#DKPagtakas	January 30, 2017	17.4%
373	12	"Ang Bisita" (The Visitor)	#DKAngBisita	January 31, 2017	16.9%
374	13	"Muling Paghaharap" (Encountering Once Again)	#DKMulingPaghaharap	February 1, 2017	16.3%
375	14	"Lamay" (The Deathwatch)	#DKLamay	February 2, 2017	17.2%
376	15	"Nalinlang" (Getting Duped)	#DKNalinlang	February 3, 2017	18.1%
377	16	"Becca at Hannah" (Becca and Hannah)	#DKBeccaAtHanna	February 6, 2017	18.0%
378	17	"Sagad na Ang Galit" (Congested Wrath)	#DKSagadNaAngGalit	February 7, 2017	19.3%
379	18	"Walang Ligtas" (No One's Safe)	#DKWalangLigtas	February 8, 2017	19.8%
380	19	"Tuloy Ang Ganti" (The Vendetta Prevails)	#DKTuloyAngGanti	February 9, 2017	20.1%
381	20	"Pagtatapos na Palaban" (The Determined Conclusion)	#DKPagtataposNaPalaban	February 10, 2017	22.2%
