= Maalaala Mo Kaya season 21 =

Maalaala Mo Kaya
- Season 21
- Starring: Charo Santos
- No. of episodes: 49

Release
- Original network: ABS-CBN
- Original release: January 6 – December 21, 2013

Season chronology
- ← Previous; Season 20 Next → Season 22

Maalaala Mo Kaya (transl. Would you remember?; abbreviated MMK), also known as Memories in English, is a Filipino television series, which was first aired on May 15, 1991. MMK is the longest-running drama anthology on Philippine television.

== Episodes ==
#	Episode title	Directed by	Written by	Original air date
110	"Puntod" "Tomb"	Mae Czarina Cruz	Joan Habana	January 5, 2013
Roque, a reserved type of guy who sought help from his younger brother Raul to win the heart of his childhood crush Merlinda. With Roque's persistence and Raul's unwavering support, Merlinda finally said yes to Roque. However, just as things were about to work well between Roque and Merlinda as future husband and wife, Raul started falling in love with Merlinda. Cast: Erik Santos, Cris Villanueva, Dominic Ochoa, Arron Villaflor, Charee Pineda, Arjo Atayde, Pinky Marquez, Efren Reyes, Deborah Sun, Levi Ignacio
111	"Bimpo" "Small Face Towel"	Nuel Crisostomo Naval	Benjamin Benson Logronio	January 12, 2013
April is a teenager who was born with cerebral palsy. Despite her condition, April was able to live a somewhat normal life with the strong support from her family, especially from her younger brother Dhayveed. The siblings' love for each other remained steadfast especially when they started schooling, but not until they reached high school. Because of April's condition, Dhayveed's classmates’ perception towards him has also been affected to the point that he was being ridiculed which consequently affected his relationship with April. Cast: Jane Oineza, Kyle Balili, Blythe Gorostiza, Joshen Bernardo, Susan Africa, Bing Davao, Via Veloso, Elaine Quemuel, Mariel Pamintuan, Kokoy de Santos, Chienna Filomeno, Laiza Comia, Brace Arquiza
112	"Orasan" "Clock"	Raz de la Torre	Benjamin Benson Logronio	January 19, 2013
Gina is a dedicated family woman, who after 36 years met her high school sweetheart Freddie. For seven days, Gina and Freddie built happy memories and through a short span of time found out that they were still deeply in love with each other. Cast: Rosanna Roces, Gary Estrada, Tippy Dos Santos, Benjamin de Guzman, Kathleen Hermosa, Beauty Gonzalez, Markki Stroem, Marlann Flores, Kristel Fulgar
113	"Palda" "Skirt"	Raz Dela Torre	Benjamin Benson Logronio	January 26, 2013
Carmi is a funny, loud and outgoing lady, who was forced by her husband Ian to become timid and formal for the sake of their marriage. Believing that their relationship will get better, Carmi followed the whims of her husband. Cast: Bangs Garcia, Tom Rodriguez, Pen Medina, Thou Reyes, Abby Bautista, Mikylla Ramirez, Veyda Inoval, Anton Diva, Gigi Locsin
114	"Sanggol" "Baby"	Mae Czarina Cruz	Arah Jell Badayos, Joan Habana	February 2, 2013
An inspiring family life of Philippine showbiz's power couple Fernando Poe Jr. and Susan Roces, with their daughter Grace. Through the eyes of their child, discover who the King and Queen of Philippine movies really are behind the glitz and glamour of showbiz. While growing up, did Grace experience difficulties for not being the real daughter of her famous parents? Was there a point in her life when she rebelled against FPJ and Susan because she was just adopted? Cast: Erich Gonzales, Tonton Gutierrez, Sheryl Cruz, Jason Abalos, Mutya Orquia, Yen Santos, Tanya Gomez, RJ Ledesma, Almira Muhlach, Carme Sanchez, Tessie Villarama
115	"Letter"	Nuel C. Naval	Mark Duane Angos, Arah Jell Badayos	February 9, 2013
For the Cayetano siblings Alan Peter and Lino, life was too simple because they had their father Rene who made all the decisions and they would just follow him. But their worlds suddenly turned upside down when their dad was diagnosed with stomach cancer. Cast: Gerald Anderson, Tommy Abuel, Jackie Lou Blanco, Empress Schuck, Carla Guevarra, Justin Gonzales, Pica Lozano, Eslove Briones, Andrei Garcia, Izzy Canillo
116	"Bahay" "House"	Theodore Boborol	Benjamin Benson Logronio	February 16, 2013
An extraordinary love story of the beautiful barrio lass Paz and the not-so-handsome but good hearted guy Andres. When Andres met Paz, he instantly knew that she was the one for him. Despite not having the ‘face value,’ Andres was determined to do everything to win Paz's heart. Unfortunately, amid all of Andres' efforts, one fact remains--Paz has no feelings for him. Cast: Meg Imperial, Ketchup Eusebio, Irma Adlawan, Al Tantay, Louella de Cordova, Dang Cruz, Devon Seron, Jess Mendoza, Jommy Teotico, Charles Christianson, Alchris Galura, Roy Requejo, Bianca Casado, Alec Dungo
117	"Kamison" "Half-slip"	Mae Czarina Cruz	Benjamin Benson Logronio, Arah Jell Badayos	February 23, 2013
A heavy family drama episode featuring Tesa, a lady who was raped by her elder brother but chose to hide the truth for the sake of her family. Cast: Boots Anson-Roa, Assunta De Rossi, Dimples Romana, Lito Pimentel, Allan Paule, Carl John Barrameda, Lander Vera Perez, Sofia Andres, Eda Nolan, Tony Mabesa, Tess Antonio, Gilleth Sandico, Laisa Comia, Jillian Aguila, Paolo Serrano, Ruby Rosa
118	"Hair Clip"	Raz Dela Torre	Benjamin Benson Logronio	March 2, 2013
Carlita and Charity are two girls who look exactly the same. Both start to question themselves as to why they look identical, but their respective parents were consistent in reminding them that they are not twins. Cast: Maricar Reyes, Belle Mariano, Elizabeth Oropesa, Aleck Bovick, Tom Olivar, Danilo Barrios, Manuel Chua, Noemi Oineza, Veronica Louise Bernardo, Bea Basa, Koreen Medina, Ingrid dela Paz
119	"Krus" "Cross"	Theodore Boborol	Enrique S. Villasis	March 9, 2013
Cast: Julia Montes, Ces Quesada, Daisy Reyes, Kiko Estrada, Giselle Sanchez, Glenda Garcia, Wendy Valdez, Madz Nicolas, Mike Lloren, Joe Vargas, Alexa Ilacad, Kazel Kinouchi
120	"Gown"	Mae Czarina Cruz	Benjamin Benson Logronio, Arah Jell Badayos	March 16, 2013
Linda is a dedicated and hardworking mother who is willing to do everything for her family, especially to her son Rubin, despite her polio illness. Cast: Pokwang, Bugoy Cariño, John Manalo, Juan Rodrigo, Crispin Pineda, Vangie Labalan, Lovely Rivero, Patrick Sugui, Eliza Pineda, Elisse Joson, Maurice Mabutas, Barbie Sabino, Sacha Arquiza
121	"Tsinelas" "Slippers"	Raz Dela Torre	Joan Habana, Arah Jell Badayos	March 23, 2013
An inspiring and empowering life story of the late Department of Interior and Local Government (DILG) secretary Jesse Robredo. How was Sec. Robredo's simple lifestyle and strong leadership molded by his family and his experiences? How huge was the part of his wife and her three daughters in his success? Cast: Jericho Rosales, Kaye Abad, Xyriel Manabat, Trina Legaspi, Nikki Bagaporo, Spanky Manikan, Peewee O'Hara, Yogo Singh, Alyanna Angeles, Richard Quan
122	"Football"	Mae Czarina Cruz	Mark Duane Angos, Arah Jell Badayos	April 6, 2013
The story of former Homeless World Cup Philippine team coach Julius Geronimo. Julius is a rebellious young man who resents his own father for being a drug addict. Julius devoted all his time in teaching and playing different sports to avoid having the same fate as his dad. When he is asked to form a football team in their town, Julius meets a group of kids who have the same vices as his father. Cast: John Prats, Nonie Buencamino, Tetchie Agbayani, Jairus Aquino, Francis Magundayao, Aaron Junatas, Philip Nolasco, Bing Davao, Arlene Tolibas, Gerald Pesigan, Andrei Garcia
123	"Ilog" "River"	Nuel Crisostomo Naval	Arah Jell Badayos	April 13, 2013
Rowena is a woman who unexpectedly fell in love with her cousin Alex after being cheated on by her husband. Despite the disapproval of their family and the criticisms of their neighbors, Rowena and Alex continued their relationship and formed their own family with their children. However, Rowena and Alex's lives changed when they noticed something different with the physical appearance of their two daughters. Is the suffering of their children God's way of punishing Rowena and Alex for their forbidden love? Or is this just an important test that will strengthen their relationship as a family? Cast: Iza Calzado, Joem Bascon, Nanding Josef, Kyline Alcantara, Veyda Inoval, Andrea del Rosario, Art Acuña, Celine Lim, Janine Berdin, Maliksi Morales, Marikit Morales
124	"Alitaptap" "Firefly"	Raz Dela Torre	Benjamin Benson Logronio, Arah Jell Badayos	April 20, 2013
Brian is a young boy who grew up exposed to poverty. At an early age, Brian worked hard to provide food for his family and served as the eyes, hands and feet of his mother who is almost blind. Amid all of his family's problems, how will Brian be able to make his family stronger when a heartbreaking tragedy comes to change their lives? Cast: Zaijan Jaranilla, Paul Salas, Precious Lara Quigaman, Epy Quizon, Miguelito De Guzman, John Vincent Servilla, Maggie Dela Riva, Marnie Lapuz
125	"Sapatos" "Shoes"	Nuel Crisostomo Naval	Mark Duane Angos, Arah Jell Badayos	April 27, 2013
The first part of the story of Senate President Juan Ponce Enrile, who was born with the name Juanito Furagganan. Juanito grew up exposed to poverty because of the abandonment of his father. When he joined the guerillas during the World War II, Juanito's life changed as he was imprisoned and was brutally tortured by their enemies. How will Juanito's experiences help in molding and strengthening his personality? Cast: Enrique Gil, Bugoy Cariño, Malou de Guzman, Alicia Alonzo, Efren Reyes Jr., Jong Cuenco, Bernard Palanca, Rochelle Barrameda, Almira Muhlach, Lorenzo Mara, Joe Gruta, Paco Evangelista, Ian Galliguez, Helga Krapf, Jessica Connelly, Marx Topacio, BJ Forbes
126	"Diploma"	Nuel Crisostomo Naval	Mark Duane Angos, Arah Jell Badayos	May 4, 2013
The second part of the story of Senate President Juan Ponce Enrile, who was born with the name Juanito Furagganan. Juanito grew up exposed to poverty because of the abandonment of his father. When he joined the guerillas during the World War II, Juanito's life changed as he was imprisoned and was brutally tortured by their enemies. How will Juanito's experiences help in molding and strengthening his personality? Cast: Enrique Gil, Malou de Guzman, Mark Gil, Snooky Serna, Alicia Alonzo, Efren Reyes Jr., Joe Gruta, Jong Cuenco, Bernard Palanca, Almira Muhlach, Helga Krapf, Jessica Connelly, Shy Carlos, Josef Elizalde, Claire Ruiz, Ya Chang, Roeder Camanag, Nathaniel Britt
127	"Drawing"	Raz dela Torre	Arah Jell Badayos	May 11, 2013
A Mother's Day presentation of the touching story of a young mom and widow named Minda. Because of poverty, Minda decided to leave her children with her in-laws in order to work and save enough money for their future. After many years, Minda finally had the guts to return to her sons and daughters, only to find out that they were maltreated by her late husband's family. Cast: Rica Peralejo, Dexter Doria, Cris Villanueva, Celine Lim, Allen Dizon, Anja Aguilar, Gemmae Custodio, Benjamin de Guzman, Deydey Amansec, Liz Alindogan, Carlo Lacana, Pamu Pamorada, Johan Santos, Aloysius Noronia
128	"Family Picture"	Mae Czarina Cruz	Benjamin Benson Logronio	May 18, 2013
The inspiring life story of Miss International Queen 2012 Kevin Balot. Being the only boy in the children of three, Kevin tried to hide his real identity and fulfill his father's dream for him to become an engineer. However, Kevin and his father's relationship began to change when he eventually decided to come out of the closet. Cast: Martin del Rosario, Al Tantay, Shamaine Centenera, Kokoy de Santos, Kristel Fulgar, Toby Alejar, Emmanuelle Vera, Cheska Billones, Louise Bernardo, Princess Freking, Dax Bayani
129	"Altar"	Erick C. Salud	Benjamin Benson Logronio	May 25, 2013
The story of cousins Jane and Lyka. From being close buddies, the cousins’ relationship started to change when Jane discovered that Lyka was working as an escort girl. Despite their disagreements, Jane did everything to help Lyka choose the right path. However, Lyka's life worsened even more as she became addicted to drugs and got impregnated by a family man. Cast: Andi Eigenmann, Desiree del Valle, Gloria Sevilla, Mickey Ferriols, Abby Bautista, Julia Klarisse Base, Ahron Villena, Simon Ibarra, Via Veloso, Mico Palanca, Mike Lloren, Lloyd Zaragoza, Girlie Alcantara
130	"Box"	Mae Czarina Cruz	Joan Habana	June 1, 2013
Reminisce the feeling of falling in love for the first time with the story of a young teenage girl named Dua. Despite her parents’ strictness, Dua was not able to stop herself from falling for her sister's best friend Bruce. Because of her closeness with him, Dua slowly begins to have less time for her friend Jayson (Khalil Ramos), who secretly has feelings for her. Cast: Ella Cruz, Khalil Ramos, Liza Soberano, Diego Loyzaga, Dominic Ochoa, Yayo Aguila
131	"Kulungan" "Cage"	Mae Czarina Cruz	Arah Jell Badayos, Joan Habana	June 8, 2013
An episode that will show how unconditional a family's love can be. The story of a loving mother named Susana who loses her sanity due to the difficult problems she has to deal with. Because of her condition, Susana's son Roy wholeheartedly takes all the responsibility of looking after his mother and siblings. Cast: Ai-Ai delas Alas, Maliksi Morales, Joseph Marco, Emilio Garcia, Raquel Montessa, Sharlene San Pedro, Veyda Inoval, Casey Da Silva, Chienna Filomeno
132	"Drawing"	Dado C. Lumibao	Mark Duane Angos	June 15, 2013
A Father's day presentation. Alex is a young teenage girl who grew up in a complete and happy family. Her life reaches a turning point when her mother leaves them for another man because of her father's drug addiction. Before her family gets even more broken, Alex eventually decides to forgive her father. She works hard to prove to her mother that their family will still be happy without her. Cast: Julia Barretto, James Blanco, Ara Mina, Tommy Abuel, Jacob Dionisio, Manuel Chua, Yda Yaneza, Marikit Morales, Kristoff Meneses
133	"Ilog" "River"	Garry Fernando	Arah Jell Badayos	June 22, 2013
A heartwarming story of a dedicated and loving mother and sister named Precy. Because of her desire to provide a better future for her children and sister Agnes, Precy decides to work overseas and save enough money for their family's needs. After many years of sacrifices and hard work, Precy returns to the Philippines only to find out that her husband Lando is having an affair with Agnes. Cast: Nikki Gil, Nikki Bagaporo, Matt Evans, Ces Quesada, Phoebe Arbotante, Yves Flores, Alec Robes, Marie Joy Dalo
134	"Notebook"	Raz dela Torre	Benjamin Benson Logronio	July 6, 2013
A story of a born mute character named Apaw, who was maltreated by his relatives. It is not a love story, but a touching tale of extraordinary courage and true friendship between Apaw and his best friend Dante. Cast: Paulo Avelino, Joem Bascon, Glenda Garcia, Alma Concepcion, John Vincent Servilla, Ismael Clavero, Jewel Mische, Jamilla Obispo, Tom Olivar, Jerome Ventinilla, Brace Hendry Aquiza
135	"Make-up"	Mae Czarina Cruz	Benjamin Benson Logronio	July 13, 2013
Ellah is a loving daughter who is willing to do everything for her family, especially when their father abandoned them for another woman. To make ends meet, Ellah has to work as a clown while studying, which tests her patience not only with kids but also with life's struggles. Cast: Angeline Quinto, Irma Adlawan, Joey Marquez, Aldred Gatchalian, Michelle Vito, Gio Alvarez, Marc Solis, Deborah Sun, Tanya Gomez, K-La Rivera, Rufami, Ingrid dela Paz, Roden Araneta
136	"Rosas" "Roses"	Nuel C. Naval	Arah Jell Badayos	July 20, 2013
A family drama episode about identical twins Fred and Freddie, who will both be maltreated and abused in the ships where they work as fishermen. Cast: Carlo Aquino, Bembol Roco, Lester Llansang, Maria Isabel Lopez, Bryan Homecillo, Neri Naig, DJ Durano, Ruben Gonzaga, Lowell Conales
137	"Picture Frame"	Dado C. Lumibao	Arah Jell Badayos	July 27, 2013
A heavy family drama episode about Claire, a loving daughter who will feel devastated and betrayed by her own family upon knowing the truth about her real identity. Cast: Assunta De Rossi, Cris Villanueva, Empress Schuck, Ramon Christopher Gutierrez, Juliana Palermo, Eva Darren, Joshua Dionisio, Devon Seron, Eda Nolan, Sharmaine Suarez, Lloyd Samartino, CJ Navato, Justin Gonzales, Arie Reyes, Ces Aldaba, Timothy Chan, Eslove Briones, Mike Austria, Miguel Morales
138	"Walis" "Broom"	Don M. Cuaresma	Joan Habana	August 3, 2013
Pinky is a lovable and helpful adoptive daughter to her aunt and uncle, who had to endure the maltreatment of her cousin, Rene. Jealous with the attention that Pinky is receiving from her parents, Rene makes Pinky's life miserable. Pinky keeps mum about the situation because she wants to finish her studies with the help of her foster family. As Pinky grows numb with Rene's physical and emotional torture to her, from being a cry baby, Pinky eventually becomes a strong woman having the motivation to be successful so she can one day get her revenge on Rene. Cast: Xyriel Manabat, Miles Ocampo, Dimples Romana, Maila Gumila, Lito Pimentel, Daisy Reyes, Allan Paule, Slater Young, Guji Lorenzana, Althea Guanzon, Sofia Millares, Alex Gonzaga
139	"VHF Radio"	Dado C. Lumibao	Mark Duane Angos	August 10, 2013
Brenda is a hardworking lady who grew up with a lot of insecurities. Her view of self even got worse when her first boyfriend cheated on her, making her believe that no one will truly love her. Cast: Meg Imperial, Bryan Santos, Melanie Marquez, William Martinez, Angeli Gonzales, Kitkat, Brenna Garcia, Annika Gonzalez, Greggy Santos, Ben Isaac
140	"Saranggola" "Kite"	Raz Dela Torre	Benjamin Benson Logronio, Arah Jell Badayos	August 24, 2013
Eddy is a father who has two families--one in Albay, while the second resides in Bacolod. How could a father forget about his first family with his children all hoping that he would help them out from poverty? Cast: Ariel Rivera, Sheryl Cruz, John Wayne Sace, Marco Gumabao, Ynna Asistio, Trina Legaspi, Karen Reyes, Jed Montero, JB Agustin, Joseph Bitangcol, Celine Lim, Arnold Reyes, Matthew Mendoza, Marissa Sanchez, Jong Cuenco, Louella De Cordova, Erin Ocampo, Alfred Labatos
141	"Rosaryo" "Rosary"	Jojo A. Saguin	Joan Habana	August 31, 2013
The inspiring life story of YouTube sensation turned Pilipinas Got Talent (PGT) season 4 grand winner Roel Manlangit. What drove Roel to achieve his ambition of becoming a singer? How hard was it for him to pursue his dreams without the support of his father whom he considers his singing idol? Cast: Zaijan Jaranilla, Romnick Sarmenta, Tina Paner, Karen Timbol, Eliza Pineda, Mariel Pamintuan, Ahron Villena, Mark Sayarot, Elijah Magundayao, Amante Pulido, Lui Manansala
142	"Pasa" "Bruise"	Don M. Cuaresma	Benjamin Benson Logronio	September 7, 2013
An empowering story of a battered wife who did everything to protect her dream family. A sensitive story about a loving and hardworking mother named Blythe who endured the physical, verbal and emotional abuse of her unemployed and abusive husband Raymond. With the intention to support her husband in providing the needs of their growing family, Blythe decided to work. But everything started to change when Raymond decided to stop working and fully depend on his wife. Cast: Denise Laurel, Rayver Cruz, Gardo Versoza, Ynez Veneracion, Dianne Medina, Beauty Gonzalez, Belle Mariano, Kyle Banzon, Elaine Quemuel, Marithez Samson, Janine Berdin, Lance Lucido, Kelly Misa, Wendy Tabusalla, Natasha Cabrera, Hannah Flores
143	"Tsubibo" "Carousel"	Garry Fernando	Mary Rose Colindres	September 14, 2013
Brenda is an insecure but talented lady who wants to prove to everyone that her short stature is not a hindrance to success. How hard is it to earn other's love and respect when you, yourself, are questioning your self-worth? Cast: Kiray Celis, Arjo Atayde, Ronnie Lazaro, Tetchie Agbayani, Raquel Villavicencio, Gilleth Sandico, Aaliyah Belmoro, EJ Jallorina, Alec Dungo, Marie Joy Dalo, JV Kapunan, Bianca Casado
142	"Tirintas" "Braid"	Raz Dela Torre	Jaymar Castro	September 21, 2013
A story of an endearing journey of joy and pains of young love. Jomer is a high school freshman who pretended to be gay just to get close to his ultimate crush Jane. Will Jomers plan of befriending Jane work or will it be the reason for the end of their budding romance? Cast: Nash Aguas, Alexa Ilacad, Ian De Leon, Jennifer Mendoza, Francis Magundayao, Khaycee Aboloc, Larah Claire Sabroso, Ogie Escanilla
143	"Elevator"	Don M. Cuaresma	Mark Duane Angos	September 28, 2013
The inspiring life story of elevator attendant turned YouTube sensation, Cherry Alejandrino, who is better known now as "Elevator Girl." What is the story behind Cherry's cheerful attitude, hardwork and dedication? Cast: Meryll Soriano, Eric Fructuoso, Boboy Garovillo, Susan Africa, Perla Bautista, Dang Cruz, Jennifer Lee, Marikit Morales
144	"Telebisyon" "Television"	Nick Olanka	Joan Habana	October 5, 2013
The inspiring life story of "TV Patrol Southern Tagalog" news anchor Joan Panopio. Discover how a poor but highly spirited girl from Batangas, who grew up being criticized because of her physical appearance and economic status, fought for her dream of becoming the next Korina Sanchez. Cast: Yen Santos, Nonie Buencamino, Kiko Estrada, Jobelle Salvador, Veyda Innoval, Claire Ruiz, RJ Ledesma, Alyanna Angeles, Laiza Comia
145	"Mask"	Jerry Lopez Sineneng	Benjamin Benson Logronio, Arah Jell Badayos	October 12, 2013
Mildred is a young lady who was diagnosed with an advanced case of tuberculosis (TB). At the hospital where she is to be confined, she meets Stuart, a nurse who would later, be the one who is "always assigned" to assist her. He is struck with "love at first sight" on Mildred. But before he met her, he was actually nursing a wounded heart, from a previous relationship. Is there a chance for love between two very sick individuals, when both of them are in need of healing - Mildred, from her physical condition and Stuart, from his emotional pains? Cast: Angel Locsin, Paulo Avelino, Mark Gil, Tanya Gomez, LJ Moreno, Johan Santos, Zeppi Borromeo, Maggie dela Riva, Madz Nicolas, Kathleen Hermosa, Mel Kimura, Agatha Tapan, Karen Dematera
146	"Medalya" "Medal"	Raz Dela Torre	Benjamin Benson Logronio	October 19, 2013
Carlos is an academically excellent working student who is driven to earn his diploma and get a decent job to support his family. But will Carlos achieve his big dream when the people he considers as inspiration do not believe in the value of education? Cast: Sam Concepcion, Rio Locsin, Jestoni Alarcon, Maliksi Morales, Yam Concepcion, Alexa Macanan
147	"Cake"	Nick Olanka	Mary Rose Colindres	October 26, 2013
Nene is a 17-year-old girl who rebelled against her parent, got pregnant at a young age, and slowly drifted herself away from her family. Cast: Jane Oineza, Joey Marquez, Mickey Ferriols, Belle Mariano, Christian Vasquez, Justin Gonzales, Chris Guttierez, Marnie Lapuz, Jerome Ventinilla
148	"Dream House"	Garry Fernando	Benjamin Benson Logronio, Arah Jell Badayos	November 2, 2013
Minda is a devoted mother of four and a forbearing wife to Paeng. She has been doing her best to keep her family intact. It was slowly falling apart because of Paeng's violent tendencies. Things seemed to turn for the better when Paeng's luck came and he won the prize of 2.1 million pesos in the lotto. Thinking that this would help heal her family's wounds and mend her children's relationship with their father, she and Paeng decided to buy a house that they have long been dreaming of having. Minda and the children would soon find out that the terror that they experience from Paeng's brutality would just be aggravated by the terror that they had to live with in a house full of strange and unseen spirits or elements from a different dimension. The worse thing was, Paeng refused to believe them and chose to stay in ... the HAUNTED HOUSE! Cast: Irma Adlawan, Bembol Roco, Ina Feleo, Alex Castro, Mico Aytona, Alyanna Asistio, Pierro Vergara
149	"Singsing" "Ring"	Nuel Crisostomo Naval	Joan Habana, Arah Jell Badayos	November 9, 2013
A story of a family woman who enters into an illicit affair with her first love. After almost three decades, destiny pulls back Emily and Roger together again. Can a mother sacrifice her happy family to continue her happy ending with her true love? Cast: Snooky Serna, Lito Pimentel, Marlann Flores, Dominic Roque, Allan Paule, Kristel Moreno, Deborah Sun, Aldred Gatchalian, Dawn Jimenez Ganiel Krishnan, Lemuel Pelayo, Sofia Andres, Archie Adamos, JV Kapunan
150	"Heels"	Nuel Crisostomo Naval	Benjamin Benson Logronio, Arah Jell Badayos	November 23, 2013
The story of identical twins Elmer and Eric, who were very close since childhood. However, after the death of their soldier father, Elmer chose to come out as gay—a decision disliked by Eric, who is a closet queen. Cast: Jackie Lou Blanco, Nikki Valdez, Ricardo Cepeda, Kit Thompson, Karen Reyes, IC Mendoza, Karen Dematera, Hyubs Azarcon, Nathan Lopez, Gammy Lopez
151	"Wedding Booth"	Raz Dela Torre	Benjamin Benson Logronio, Arah Jell Badayos	November 30, 2013
Both Gel and Marq are best friends since from the beginning in college. As they are always together from being students to post-graduates, then as becoming teachers in which they were also working together in their previous school, Gel had already been started to develop feelings for Marq, as she wanted to be more than a friend to him. However, Marq doesn't have feelings for her as it may cause Gel to dismay to wait for his answer and would eventually end up of being just friends only, forever and always. Cast: Alex Gonzaga, Arron Villaflor, Ingrid dela Paz, Shy Carlos, Pamu Pamorada, Josef Elizalde, Yves Flores, Ryan Boyce, Annika Gonzales
152	"Family Picture"	Garry Fernando	Arah Jell Badayos, Benjamin Benson Logronio	December 7, 2013
An episode on how to help a family achieve their Christmas wish to be reunited with each other and restart a new life altogether. A story of a family that was shattered by domestic violence, which later caused the 13 siblings to go on separate ways. Judith is one of the siblings who suffered from the cruelty of their father and was adopted by a foster family that even made her life more miserable. After all the sufferings that she went through, how did Judith remain hopeful that her real family will be reunited once more? Cast: Xyriel Manabat, Valerie Concepcion, Chanda Romero, Pinky Amador, Rez Cortez, Neil Coleta, Ron Morales, Cherry Lou, Andrea del Rosario, Marissa Sanchez, Jao Mapa, Alfred Labatos, Myrtle Sarrosa, Eslove Briones, Gerald Pesigan, Shane Hermogenes, Bianca Bentulan, Queenie Sulit
153	"Double Bass"	Nuel Crisostomo Naval	Arah Jell Badayos, Benjamin Benson Logronio	December 14, 2013
A family drama episode. After his father left them, Christian felt the need to do everything to bring back his mother's smile. He strived hard to study and later on became part of an orchestra, which he thought would bring back the spark of joy in his mother's eyes. What kind of misery would drive a mother to end her own life? How would a child accept a tragedy that happened to his beloved mother? Cast: Nash Aguas, Ara Mina, Eva Darren, Deydey Amansec, Archie Alemania, Casey da Silva, Jeffrey Hidalgo, Elaine Quemuel, Jessette Prospero
154	"Bituin" "Star"	Nuel Crisostomo Naval	Arah Jell Badayos, Joan Habana	December 21, 2013
A story that will make us realize the value of unity in a family, especially in its most trying times. Witness in the story how Edwin cold heart changed when his nephew, JV was diagnosed with a disease called Thalassemia. How did a sad news about an illness remove all the anger in one's heart and even made a families bond stronger? Cast: Gerald Anderson, Bugoy Cariño, Alicia Alonzo, Nanding Josef, JB Agustin, Melissa Mendez, Joshua Dionisio, Patrick Sugui, Miguelito de Guzman, Shey Bustamante, Paolo Rivero, Nico Antonio
