= Maalaala Mo Kaya season 23 =

Maalaala Mo Kaya
- Season 23
- Starring: Charo Santos
- No. of episodes: 49

Release
- Original network: ABS-CBN
- Original release: January 3 – December 26, 2015

Season chronology
- ← Previous; Season 22 Next → Season 24

Maalaala Mo Kaya (transl. Would you remember?; abbreviated MMK), also known as Memories in English, is a Filipino television series, which was first aired on May 15, 1991. MMK is the longest-running drama anthology on Philippine television.

== Episodes ==
#	Episode title	Directed by	Written by	Original air date
1	"Parol" "Lantern"	Mae Czarina Cruz-Alviar	Benjamin Benson Logronio, Arah Jell Badayos	January 3, 2015 (re-aired on January 1, 2022)
Daisy, the adopted daughter of Ed and Erlie, took over as breadwinner when her father's business failed. But her strength will be put to the test when she deals with her mother's breast cancer and her father's heart ailment. How did Daisy remain unfazed and determined to be her family's source of strength? How far can a daughter's unconditional love go when both of her beloved parents seem to let go? Cast: Kathryn Bernardo, Assunta de Rossi, Smokey Manaloto, Ynna Asistio, Patrick Sugui, Eslove Briones, Dionne Monsanto, Kazumi Porquez
2	"Hagdanan" "Staircase"	Raz Dela Torre	Mary Rose Colindres, Arah Jell Badayos	January 10, 2015
Andre has always lived life happily despite having difficulty walking because of a rare muscle disease called muscular dystrophy. He grew up to be an optimistic student, and his father Rodolfo, was always at his side to lift his spirits up with constant love and encouragement. How will Andre deal with life's challenges when his ultimate source of strength, his father, suddenly leaves his side? Will he succumb to hopelessness, or will he continue to reach for the dreams that his father envisioned for him? Cast: Jairus Aquino, Dominic Ochoa, Precious Lara Quigaman, Eliza Pineda, Angelo Ilagan, JB Agustin
3	"Kamay" "Hand"	Nuel Crisostomo Naval	Ruel Montañez, Arah Jell Badayos	January 17, 2015
Christine Balaguer became one of the Top 13 candidates in this year's Miss World Philippines pageant. Discover how Christine grew up to be optimistic, living a normal life despite her physical challenges, and how she became an inspiration for the deaf and other differently abled people like her to reach for their dreams. Cast: Venus Raj, Carmi Martin, Matt Evans, Anna Luna, Eagle Riggs, RS Francisco, Brenna Garcia, EJ Jallorina, Lui Manansala, Marnie Lapuz, Joyce So, Dhexie Daulat
4	"Korona" "Crown"	Elfren Parpan Vibar	Ruel Montañez, Arah Jell Badayos	January 24, 2015
Adoy, who despite his disapproval of his son's sexual preference, remained the strength of his child especially during life's hardest trials. Cast: Edgar Allan Guzman, Nonie Buencamino, Shamaine Buencamino, Kokoy de Santos, John Spainhour, Neil Coleta, Vickie Rushton, Mikylla Ramirez, Casey da Silva, Winryll Banaag, Luke Jickain, Rica Paras, Mike Lloren
5	"Baller"	Raz Dela Torre	Jimuel P. dela Cruz, Arah Jell Badayos	January 31, 2015
How a couple, together with their two children, survive on the meager earnings of Marlon, who scavenges for metal junk in creeks for a living. Learn how their unexpected win became an answer to their prayers. Cast: Alex Gonzaga, Matteo Guidicelli, Malou de Guzman, Rez Cortez, Maila Gumila, Kyline Alcantara, Johan Santos, Zeppi Borromeo, Kim Molina, Prince Stefan
6	"Spaghetti"	Garry Fernando	Joan Habana, Arah Jell Badayos	February 7, 2015
Marvin is a guy who continues to long for his first love, Lara, despite having his own family with his wife, Dianne. Cast: Jake Cuenca, Arci Muñoz, Andrea Brillantes, Bugoy Cariño, Mika Dela Cruz, CJ Navato, Miko Raval, Deniesse Joaquin, Carla Guevarra, AJ Muhlach, Lemuel Pelayo, Sarah Richards
7	"Stuffed Toy"	Frasco Mortiz	Benjamin Benson Logronio, Arah Jell Badayos	February 14, 2015
Carmina was initially bound by the fascination with romance novels and the list of love signs, which she thought led her to Mr. Right, Yong. Can Yong and Carmina's relationship founded on superficial hints last when challenges take its toll on them? Cast: James Reid, Nadine Lustre, Sharmaine Arnaiz, Hiyasmin Neri, Andre Garcia, Myrtle Sarrosa, Erin Ocampo, Kyra Custodio, Aina Solano, Noel Colet, Maritess Samson, Nicole Baranda, Axel Torres, Onse Tolentino
8	"Mangga at Bagoong" "Mango and Shrimp Paste"	Raz Dela Torre	Mary Rose Colindres, Arah Jell Badayos	February 21, 2015
After years of living away from each other, Eunice and Febie reunite after the latter flies back to the Philippines from Malaysia to treat her colon cancer and reach out to her family, including her beloved twin whom she is asked to look after her family once she passes away. Soon, Febie peacefully died and Eunice, who is a widow, starts fulfilling her promise to her sister by comforting Febie's family, especially the husband who became emotionally devastated by his loss. What will Eunice do when her closeness with her twin sister's husband develops into serious romance? Can they move on from Febie's memory, stand up for their love, and handle the disapproval of the people around them, including their families? Cast: Dina Bonnevie, Tonton Gutierrez, Dante Ponce, Neri Naig, Michelle Vito, Jenny Miller, Rochelle Barrameda, Simon Ibarra, McCoy de Leon
9	"E-Mail"	Raz Dela Torre	Benjamin Benson Logronio, Arah Jell Badayos	February 28, 2015
What will Andrew and Bea do when romance sparks between them years after college and now that the latter is already married to another man? Cast: Shaina Magdayao, JC De Vera, Lito Pimentel, Daisy Reyes, Louise Abuel, Marlann Flores, Joseph Bitangcol, Ahron Villena, Paco Evangelista, Jose Sarasola
10	"Manika" "Doll"	Jerry Lopez Sineneng	Ruel Montañez	March 7, 2015
Two sisters, Myra and Thelma whose relationship will be put to test as they grow up getting jealous over their parents' attention. But everything changes when Myra is diagnosed with kidney failure. Will Myra's serious illness signal the end for her or will it mark a new chapter in her relationship with Thelma? How will they realize that they truly care for each other? How far can Thelma's love go just to prolong the life of her beloved sister, Myra? Cast: Isabelle Daza, Miles Ocampo, Snooky Serna, Allan Paule, Belle Mariano, Nathan Lopez, Raquel Montesa, Peewee O'Hara, Ryan Ramos, Althea Guanzon, Bea Basa, John Vincent Servilla
11	"Pictures"	Garry Fernando	Joan Habana	March 14, 2015
Andrea and Jason got married in haste in Saudi Arabia due to an unplanned pregnancy. Despite having been abandoned by Jason when she delivered a stillborn baby, Andrea reconciles with her husband a year later, hoping to build the happy family she has always dreamt of with him. However, four years later, Andrea discovers all the lies that Jason has expertly woven, including their long-annulled marriage. Will love be enough to cover up all the hurt caused by the lies of one's beloved? Cast: Denise Laurel, Arjo Atayde, John Arcilla, Maureen Mauricio, Jamilla Obispo, Dale Baldillo, Menggie Cobarrubias, Bryan Termulo
12	"Class Card"	Raz Dela Torre	Benjamin Benson Logronio	March 21, 2015
Francis is a teenage boy who finds amusement and solace in TV shows at an early age. Everything was normal until his fascination turned into an addiction as he became an avid fan of a rising teen actor. How far will it take a super fan to show his love for his idol? What will drive someone to finally end his addiction? Cast: Francis Magundayao, Angel Aquino, Juan Rodrigo, Devon Seron, Kiray Celis, Karen Reyes, Brace Arquiza, Sonjia Calit, Bryan Homecillo, Kristel Fulgar, Celine Lim, Miguel Vergara
13	"Sanggol" "Baby"	Garry Fernando	Arah Jell Badayos, Jimuel P. Dela Cruz	March 28, 2015
Bheng becomes a single mother to her daughter Joy when her boyfriend refuses to take responsibility for their child. When Joy grew older, Bheng is forced to work abroad to make ends meet for her family. She left Joy in the care of her grandparents. In the absence of her mother's guidance, Joy started exploring her sexuality and ended up getting pregnant by her boyfriend, who eventually left her to raise their baby alone. How hurtful is it for a single mother to learn that her beloved child will go through the same ordeal as she had in the past? What will a daughter do to make up for her mistakes? Cast: Ara Mina, Sofia Andres, Pen Medina, Liz Alindogan, Julian Estrada, Bea Saw, Alyanna Angeles
14	"Takure" "Kettle"	Emmanuel Q. Palo	Benjamin Benson Logronio	April 11, 2015
Discover the personal battle that MJ had won even before her career in beauty pageants flourished. How did the young MJ strive for her dreams without her parents beside her? Who inspired her to become a fighter in life? Cast: Cherie Gil, Ronnie Lazaro, Isabel Oli, Encar Benedicto, Minco Fabregas, Sofia Millares, Veyda Inoval, Jun Jun Quintana, Kyline Alcantara, Bianca Bentulan, Mary Jean Lastimosa
15	"Bota" "Boots"	Mae Czarina Cruz-Alviar	Joan Habana	April 18, 2015
Paul, a firefighter who sacrificed almost all his time for his family just to save lives. What will Paul do once his own home is "under fire"? How will life teach Paul the value of giving time for his family and his career? Cast: JM De Guzman, Nonie Buencamino, Michelle Madrigal, Ana Capri, Angelo Ilagan, Lorenzo Mara, Faye Alhambra, Elaine Quemuel
16	"Plano" "Plan"	Garry Fernando	Benjamin Benson Logronio, Arah Jell Badayos	April 25, 2015
A two-part special tribute for the SAF44 who died during the Mamasapano clash. Garry and Suzette are a young couple whose love for each other and dreams for the future will be tested by fate. Cast: Angel Locsin, Coco Martin, Ejay Falcon, Rita Avila, Efren Reyes Jr., Dante Ponce, Dang Cruz, Michael Roy Jornales, Mike Lloren, Trina Legaspi, Dionne Monsanto, Alex Medina, Denise Aguilar, Johan Santos, Jed Montero, Marx Topacio, Aina Solano, Dale Baldillo, Jillian Aguila, Macky Billones
17	"Watawat" "Flag"	Garry Fernando	Benjamin Benson Logronio, Arah Jell Badayos	May 2, 2015
Continuation of the two-part special tribute for SAF44. Rennie and Garry's friendship was strengthened by their dedication and love for the country. Discover what happened in Garry and Rennie's battle and how hard their teams helped each other to succeed in their mission for the sake of protecting the Filipino people. Cast: Angel Locsin, Coco Martin, Ejay Falcon, Ella Cruz, Malou de Guzman, Maricar Reyes, Pen Medina, Rita Avila, Efren Reyes Jr., Dante Ponce, Dang Cruz, Michael Roy Jornales, Mike Lloren, Trina Legaspi, Alex Medina, Deniesse Joaquin, Johan Santos, CX Navarro, Marx Topacio, Aina Solano, Mikylla Ramirez, John Vincent Servilla, Mitch Naco, Chacha Canete, Louise Bernardo
18	"Ilog" "River"	Mae Czarina Cruz-Alviar	Benjamin Benson Logronio	May 9, 2015 (re-aired on May 11, 2019)
Belen is a mother who only wants to give the best for her children. Because of her husband's irresponsibility, Belen was forced to leave her family to undergo a training in Manila. However, when she returned after three months, Belen's world crumbled when she discovered that her husband sold all of their children. Cast: Sam Concepcion, Epy Quizon, Ian de Leon, JB Agustin, Eva Darren, Neri Naig, Kristel Fulgar, Nikki Bagaporo, Raquel Montesa, Tom Olivar, Celine Lim, Mariel Pamintuan, Crispin Pineda, Judy Ann Santos-Agoncillo
19	"Pagkain" "Food"	Elfren Parpan Vibar	Jimuel P. Dela Cruz	May 16, 2015
Mai is a young woman who grew up with a lot of insecurities because of her excessive weight. Despite her lack of confidence in herself, Mai experiences the sweetness and pain of love from her first boyfriend who cheated on her. However, Mai eventually learns to move on and begins to believe in love again when she meets Phil at a youth fellowship. How was Mai able to face all the pains and heartbreaks that she suffered from the people she loved and trusted wholeheartedly? Did she finally learn to love and accept herself despite the judgment of other people because of her obesity? Cast: Melissa Ricks, Matt Evans, Nadia Montenegro, Ramon Christopher, Neil Coleta, Pamu Pamorada, Alex Castro, Jojit Lorenzo, Sophia Baars, Alexa Macanan, Joaquin Reyes, Jirianne Montilla
20	"Entablado" "Stage"	Raz Dela Torre	Ruel Montañez	May 23, 2015
Because of her dream to give her family a better life, Liza did everything to be able to work as an entertainer in Japan. However, Liza's life crumbled when she realized that her recruiter fooled her, and she was forced to work as a GRO in a club. What were the sacrifices did Liza have to make just to send money to her parents and siblings? How was she able to regain her self-respect after the hell she has been through as a GRO? Cast: Sue Ramirez, Celine Lim, Isay Alvarez, Allan Paule, Eagle Riggs, Anna Luna, Patrick Sugui, Elisse Joson, Chienna Filomeno, Mike Austria, Arnold Reyes, Marnie Lapuz
21	"Medical Record"	Nuel Crisostomo Naval	Arah Jell Badayos, Joan Habana	May 30, 2015
Veron is a loving mother who dedicated her whole life to take care of her husband and their five children. Along with the pain of finding out about her husband's infidelity, Veron finds out that she has cervical cancer. Discover the truth about this alarming sickness among women through Veron's story. Witness how she found the strength to overcome and survive the hardest challenge she has ever faced in her life. Cast: Angel Aquino, Tonton Gutierrez, Trina Legaspi, Wendy Valdez, Eliza Pineda, Kyline Alcantara, Louise Abuel, Laiza Comia, Carla Martinez, Elaine Quemuel, Gerard Acao, Bea Basa, Dexie Daulat, Kazumi Porquez
22	"Sapatos" "Shoes"	Jerry Lopez Sineneng	Benjamin Benson Logronio	June 6, 2015
Cecile is an 18-year-old girl who fell in love with a city mayor named Roel. Despite their huge age gap and the disapproval of her family, Cecile was blinded by love and enamored by the lavish lifestyle that Roel has given her. However, things begin to change when Cecile got pregnant and Roel decided to hide her from everyone because of his political plans. What did Cecile have to go through when Roel left her for good? How did her family help her to accept her mistakes and devote all her love to her child? Cast: Jessy Mendiola, Ariel Rivera, Irma Adlawan, Belle Mariano, Karen Timbol, Eda Nolan, Mike Lloren, Allyson McBride
23	"Sketch Pad"	Garry Fernando	Ruel Montañez	June 13, 2015
After he and his brother ran away from home, Rustie was exposed to different vices and crimes when he befriended other street children who learned to steal and use drugs. However, Rustie's life began to change when he met a street artist who inspired him to pursue his dreams of studying in a prestigious university. How did all the pain and hardships that Rustie had to go through help him succeed in achieving his goals in life? Where did he get the strength to move on from his past and change his own destiny? Cast: Zaijian Jaranilla, Kean Cipriano, Cris Villanueva, Andrea del Rosario, Jeric Raval, Kokoy de Santos, Junjun Quintana, Lance Lucido, Kyle Banzon, Tanya Gomez, Encar Benedicto, Gerald Pesigan, John Vincent Servilla, Carlo Lacana, JM Ibañez, Paco Evangelista, Winryll Banaag, Tony Manalo
24	"Camera"	Mae Czarina Cruz-Alviar	Joan Habana	June 20, 2015
Melai will give life to the role of Joanna, a woman who grew up being dependent on her parents and not knowing how to do household chores. Because of this, Joanna had a hard time adjusting to her married life, especially when her husband Allan lost his job and she was forced to leave their children to work as a nanny in Kuwait. Cast: Melai Cantiveros, Sharmaine Suarez, Jason Francisco, Mutya Orquia, Brenna Garcia, Sofia Millares, Althea Guanzon, Rubi Rubi, Chiqui del Carmen, Jet Alcantara
25	"Hat"	FM Reyes	Benjamin Benson Logronio, Arah Jell Badayos	June 27, 2015
Tarik is a son who wanted to forget his past after his family broke apart and his mother Espie became severely depressed. An accident separated him from his mom, and Tarik tried to move on and forget all the painful and bitter memories of his childhood. But still, he felt incomplete and unfulfilled. Tarik's life eventually changed when he decided to make amends for his folly and searched for Espie in their province, where he met Rea, the woman who became the love of his life and the source of his strength. Cast: John Lloyd Cruz, Kaye Abad, Agot Isidro, Marlann Flores, Harvey Bautista, Jong Cuenco, Maila Gumila, Nico Antonio, Sonjia Calit
26	"Sinigang"	Raz de la Torre	Benjamin Benson Logronio, Arah Jell Badayos	July 4, 2015
Despite the separation of his parents, Macky grew up feeling complete and happy because of the love of his mother Marciana and his stepdad Renato. However, all this changed when Marciana suddenly dies and Macky feels that Renato has never loved him as a real son. What kind of pain and hardships did Macky have to go through when he felt that he lost both of his parents? How did he and Renato find it in their hearts to forgive each other and rebuild the good relationship they once had? Cast: Joey Marquez, Patrick Garcia, Ara Mina, Bugoy Cariño, Perla Bautista, Archie Alemania, Richard Quan, Luke Jickain, Alexa Macanan, Nathaniel Britt, Anjo Damiles
27	"Picture"	Theodore Boborol	Rose Colindres, Arah Jell Badayos	July 11, 2015
Rosa is a young woman who fell in love with a man who, unknown to her, is already married. Amidst her happy relationship with Boyet, Rosa's joy turned into pain and sadness when she discovered the secret of the man she loved the most. But despite knowing that it was a mistake, Rosa continued her affair with Boyet, who did everything to save their relationship. However, Rosa's conscience was put to the test when she found out that Boyet's legal wife, Cheche, was suffering from a serious kidney problem. Cast: Julia Montes, Antoinette Taus, Joross Gamboa, Jobelle Salvador, Ingrid dela Paz, Abby Bautista, Faye Alhambra, Jef Gaitan, Ronnie Alonte
28	"Box"	Frasco Mortiz	Mark Duane Angos	July 18, 2015
Tess and Joey who have been planning for their big day after being away from each other for a long time. But all anticipation of marital bliss turns to sorrow when Joey admits to Tess that he has an affair with another woman. Cast: Edgar Allan Guzman, Maxene Magalona, Pinky Amador, Roxanne Barcelo, Maggie dela Riva, Rochelle Barrameda, Ricardo Cepeda, Lui Villaruz, Ronalisa Cheng, AJ Muhlach, Deydey Amansec
29	"Bracelet"	Garry Fernando	Ruel Montañez, Arah Jell Badayos	July 25, 2015
Alyssa is a young woman who grew up living with her three old-maid grandmothers. Despite her love for them, Alyssa began to resent her grandmothers and decided to run away because they were over-protective and overly strict. Can Alyssa abandon the women who raised her and sacrificed their own dreams just to give her a better future? Cast: Julia Barretto, Gloria Sevilla, Nanette Inventor, Pinky Marquez, Precious Lara Quigaman, Ynna Asistio, Allyson McBride, Erin Ocampo, Kyra Custodio
30	"Computer Shop"	Nick Olanka	Beson Logronio	August 1, 2015
It is a deep friendship, Ruby and Engel can't stop to fall for each other, despite having a 15-year difference of their ages. It is a challenge to Engel because Ruby is pregnant and he forced to stop studying to face the responsibility as a young father. Cast: Tanya Garcia, Yves Flores, Snooky Serna, Tanya Gomez, Carla Humphries, Patrick Sugui, Jon Lucas, Archie Adamos, Ronnie Quizon, Nikki Bagaporo, Denise Joaquin
31	"Rubber Shoes"	Garry Fernando	Mark Duane Angos	August 15, 2015
A story that will inspire viewers to fight for their dreams as it shares the life story of a student-athlete diagnosed with Tuberculosis of the bone. Despite having difficulty walking, Efren tried to overcome his sickness and continued to pursue his dream of becoming part of his school's track-and-field program. Cast: Jairus Aquino, Emilio Garcia, Assunta De Rossi, Kyle Banzon, Manuel Chua, Joaquin Reyes, John Bermundo
32	"Bottled Water"	Raz Dela Torre	Benson Logronio	August 22, 2015
Zyra is a teenager who has a lot of bad experiences in love. When she entered college, Zyra had her hopes up once again to find the man of her dreams when she met Arnie (Manolo), her schoolmate who is openly gay. Because of his sexual preference, Arnie shocked everyone when he confessed that he has developed feelings for Zyra. Cast: Maris Racal, Manolo Pedrosa, Jestoni Alarcon, Irma Adlawan, Joj Agpangan, Fifth Solomon, Ryan Bacala, Barbie Imperial, Junjun Quintana, CJ Navato, Raine Salamante, Alfred Labatos, Paolo Angeles
33	"Barko" "Ship"	Frasco Mortiz	Mark Duane Angos	August 29, 2015
A story that will highlight the importance of family amidst fulfilling one's own dreams. Life has always been hard on Aurora and her sons Mark and Michael. It even reaches a point where Aurora is forced to have Mark adopted by a barangay catechist to give him a better life. Because of this, Mark grows reserved and aloof from his mother and brother until he leaves for Cebu to pursue his studies. While he is away, Mark learns that Aurora has left for Manila for no reason, convincing Mark that she has abandoned him and Michael. This triggers hatred in Mark's heart, which motivates him to fulfill his dream of being a seaman. Cast: Sunshine Cruz, Paul Salas, Francis Magundayao, Daria Ramirez, William Lorenzo, Carla Guevarra, CX Navarro, Nhikzy Calma, Raquel Monteza, Lui Manansala, Pepe Herrera, McCoy de Leon, Lloyd Abella
34	"Eye Glasses"	Jerry Lopez Sineneng	Joan Habana	September 5, 2015
A touching story about making sacrifices for love. Rolland is a young man who is ready to do everything for his girlfriend Mary. When Mary's uncle threatened to ruin their relationship by not paying for her tuition and sending her back to the province, Rolland sacrificed most of his earnings just to be able to finance Mary's last year in college. However, Rolland and Mary's relationship began to turn sour when she decided to leave Rolland to work abroad. Cast: Joseph Marco, Sue Ramirez, Lito Pimentel, Isay Alvarez, Shy Carlos, Minco Fabregas, Joseph Bitangcol, Liezel Garcia, Bugoy Drilon, Miko Raval, Jose Sarasola, Axel Torres, Elisse Joson
35	"Spaghetti"	Nuel Crisostomo Naval	Nikki Bunquin	September 12, 2015
An extraordinary story of a loving mother who strives do everything for her son. With a spirited attitude and a more positive outlook in life, Maritess, did everything she could to show her son Jeremy how much she loved and cared for him. Cast: Snooky Serna, Nash Aguas, Pen Medina, JB Agustin, Maureen Mauricio, Peewee O'Hara, Nene Tamayo, Crispin Pineda, Marnie Lapuz, Popper Bernadas, Rufami
36	"Sulat" "Letter"	Dondon S. Santos	Benjamin Benson Logronio	September 19, 2015
A different story of bravery and hope as it depicts the ordeal faced by three gay friends who were abducted by rebels. Momar, Ramram and Jupiter met at a city state college and became good friends since then. They stuck with each other through ups and downs, and would share with each other their problems and would even party together in night clubs. Their friendship was full of color and life until one day, they were held hostage by the Moro National Liberation Front (MNLF). They went through the toughest test of their lives as they could lose their lives any minute. They also witnessed other hostages die in front of them and even became part of a human barricade against the military. Despite these, they remained strong and would even make things lighter for everyone by cracking jokes. Cast: John Manalo, Neil Coleta, Nathan Lopez, Allan Paule, Almira Muhlach, Junjun Quintana, Patrick Sugui, Alchris Galura, Lemuel Pelayo, Roeder Camanag, Joe Vargas, Gilleth Sandico, Marithez Samson, Althea Guanzon
37	"Banana Cue"	Frasco Mortiz	Mark Duane Angos	September 26, 2015
Before she conquered "The Voice Kids" season two stage, grand champion Elha Nympha first conquered the streets of Kamuning, Quezon City as she sings her heart out while selling banana cue to passersby. Elha had realized her passion for singing at age three. Her mother Lucy encouraged her further by letting her sing in their karaoke machine and undergo vocal training with her aunt Digna. Elha joined a couple of auditions for different talent searches but she failed to make it past the first level. Despite this, she remained positive that she would achieve her dreams of becoming a professional singer and fulfill her father Obet's dream of seeing her on TV one day. However, Elha's dream was put on hold with the sudden death of her father. Being the eldest daughter, Elha thought of ways to help her mother with their finances and started selling banana cue on the streets of Kamuning. But Elha did not turn her back on singing as she then sang for her banana cue customers. With her newfound confidence, Elha decided to audition for "The Voice Kids", a decision that changed her life forever. Cast: Brenna Garcia, Nikki Valdez, Tina Paner, Matt Evans, Paco Evangelista, Bryan Termulo, Hyubs Azarcon, Menggie Cobarrubias, Tom Doromal, Bianca Bentulan
38	"Bintana" "Window"	Elfren Vibar	Joan Habana, Arah Jell Badayos	October 3, 2015
Neighbors Prima and Teddy grew up together in their late 40s and became good friends. As they get to know each other more, their friendship slowly turned into romance. Cast: Agot Isidro, Tonton Gutierrez, Sofia Andres, Diego Loyzaga, Bugoy Cariño, Casey Da Silva, Jeffrey Santos, Marina Benipayo, Maila Gumila, Karen Timbol, Emmanuelle Vera, Carla Humphries, Elisse Joson, Claire Ruiz, Dexie Daulat, Margareth Naco, Anna Vicente
39	"Barung Barong" "Shack"	Jaymar Castro, Arah Jell Badayos	Don Cuaresma	October 10, 2015
For several years, Noel has been homeless after he decided to run away from his family who could not accept his homosexuality. At age 66, however, he met Yolly and her family, who took him in. Noel became very close to them especially to Yolly who would run to him for financial, emotional and moral support. An orphan herself, Yolly found a father figure in Noel when she's having problems with her drunkard husband Joseph. Their closeness then became the cause of Joseph's jealousy. Despite the kindness he is showing, Noel continued to hear hurtful accusations from Joseph that prompted him to just run away. Will they see Noel again? What will Noel do that will make Joseph have a change of heart? Cast: Meryll Soriano, Lito Pimentel, Alex Medina, Inah Estrada, Johan Santos, Ruby Ruiz, Nhikzy Calma, Roden Araneta, Miguel Vergara
40	"Karaoke"	Raz de la Torre	Ruel Montañez, Arah Jell Badayos	October 17, 2015
At an early age, Monica joined singing contests in her province. Together with her mother Myrna, who is also a singer, they would perform at wakes, birthday parties, and other events. She was only eight years old when she ended up under the care of her aunt Ethel after her mother succumbed to cervical cancer. To support her schooling, Monica peddled rice cakes and ice candies. To attract more customers, Monica serenaded them with her sweet voice. In 2010, Ethel convinced her to join ABS-CBN's talent search "Star Power" where she finished 2nd runner-up. It opened doors for her to begin the career she had always wanted and also gave her a taste of the show business. But at 15 years old, Monica got caught up with the lifestyle and tried to fit in by putting on a new persona, which affected her personal relationships with some people closest to her. As offers and gigs started to dwindle, Monica returned to Ormoc and resumed her normal life. Until one day, opportunity knocked once more. Cast: Aiko Melendez, Sarah Lahbati, Francine Prieto, Yesha Camile, Katya Santos, Mara Lopez, Simon Ibarra, Jong Cuenco, Kyline Alcantara, Chienna Filomeno, Jacob Dionisio, Kyle Secades, Mikee Agustin, Margo Midwinter
41	"Itak" "Bolo"	Jerry Lopez Sineneng	Benjamin Benson Logronio, Arah Jell Badayos	October 24, 2015
Leni was only five years old when her very own father Ramon raped her. He was proven guilty of the crime and got convicted. Six years after, however, Ramon obtained pardon and went back home, leaving Leni worried for the safety of her younger sister Aileen. Just as she suspected, Ramon did start doing lascivious acts on the innocent 17-year-old girl that eventually led to rape. Aileen, feeling very helpless, ran away and kept the shattering experience all to herself. When Leni found out about what happened, she bravely searched for Aileen. Fate found a way for them to be back in each other's arms until another difficult ordeal unfolded once more- Aileen got impregnated by her own father. How will Aileen take this news? How will this affect Leni, who blames herself for not being courageous enough to protect her sister? Cast: Claudine Barretto, Mika Dela Cruz, Gardo Versoza, Maureen Mauricio, Sue Ramirez, Jao Mapa, Mike Austria, Via Veloso, Allyson McBride, Noel Colet, Jeffrey Hidalgo, Paolo Gumabao, Marco Pingol, Louise Bernardo
42	"Gown"	Nick Olanka	Jaymar Castro, Arah Jell Badayos	November 7, 2015
At a young age, Rommel was physically and verbally abused by his stepfather Rogelio who cannot accept his child's sexual preference. Unfortunately, his mother Leonor wasn't able to defend him from the violent ways of her partner. At eleven years old, Rommel ran away from home and lived on the streets where he felt a sense of belongingness. However, he becomes a victim of a syndicate that prostitutes children to Arab men. Luckily, Rommel was able to escape and returned home. Unfortunately for him, things did not change and he still felt unloved. He then decided to work hard and grew up to be a very successful man. With his new found strength and success in life, can he also find it in his heart to forgive his stepfather and mother for their wrongdoings? Cast: Junjun Quintana, Mickey Ferriols, Ian de Leon, Izzy Canillo, John Vincent Servilla. Michelle Vito, Joshua Dionisio, Bryan Homecillo, Gem Ramos, Marnie Lapuz, Cheska Billiones, Shekanaiah Gamit
43	"Pink Dress"	Frasco Mortiz	Benjamin Benson Logronio, Arah Jell Badayos	November 14, 2015
Abigail and Amabelle are fraternal twins. Abigail has fairer skin while Amabelle has a darker complexion. The two grew up to be close as sisters and friends, until they reach high school where their differences became more pronounced. Abigail is favored by suitors and teachers because of her looks, while Amabelle always excels in class. As time passes by, the two became envious of each other's distinct qualities. Abigail has always wished that she is as smart as Amabelle, while Amabelle wished she has Abigail's face. The competition between the two of them in their home and in school started a rift and caused jealousy between the twin sisters, especially with Amabelle who sees Abigail being more favored over her. How will the relationship of the twins be affected by their jealousy? Will they go back from how close they used to be? Cast: Julia Barretto, Janella Salvador, Aleck Bovick, Jake Roxas, Karen Reyes, McCoy de Leon, Allyson McBride, Jillian Aguila
44	"Banana Split"	Raz de la Torre	Mark Duane Angos, Arah Jell Badayos	November 21, 2015
Trevor has been stuttering since age three. He grew up in an environment that discourages him from speaking. Because of this, he developed skills in writing stories and poems. When he entered college, Trevor fell in love with Emma and so they secretly became a couple. He found comfort with the girl, and his stuttering disappeared. Unfortunately, the day came when Emma decided to break up with Trevor and told him to delete their photos and proof that they became a couple. Cast: Miles Ocampo, Iñigo Pascual, Andrea del Rosario, Patrick Sugui, Jon Lucas, Yana Asistio, Julian Estrada, Minco Fabregas, Art Acuña, JV Kapunan, Paolo Santiago, Ronnie Alonte, Miggy Campbell
45	"Gasa" "Gauze"	Elfren Vibar	Ruel Montañez, Arah Jell Badayos	November 28, 2015
Ashley is a six-year-old child who suffers from two diseases: bone marrow cancer and a rare skin disease called epidermolysis bullosa. However, despite these struggles, Ashley remains optimistic while undergoing treatment. Unfortunately, Ashley's condition caused a rift between her mother Jennifer and her grandmother Cleofe. The grandmother takes care of the sick child because Jennifer does not have the heart to see her daughter suffer from her diseases. Aside from that, it is Cleofe's way of making up for her daughter whom she neglected in the past. Will Jennifer learn to be bold in taking good care of her own daughter? Will Cleofe and Jennifer patch things up for the sake of Ashley? Cast: Coney Reyes, Jana Agoncillo, Precious Lara Quigaman, Marco Alcaraz, Juan Rodrigo, Suzette Ranillo, CJ Navato, Anna Luna, Sofia Millares, Arvin Arellano
46	"Lubid" "Rope"	Nuel C. Naval	Benjamin Benson Logronio, Arah Jell Badayos	December 5, 2015
Sima is a caring and thoughtful mother but at the same time very strict and harsh when disciplining her children Nine, Pau, Aaron and Adet. Thus, the four grew up distant from and fearful of her. This hurts Sima so much and makes her feel useless. Adding up to her worries is their financial instability. One day, Sima decides to end it all and hangs herself. How will the children deal with her death? How will they move on from the tragedy? Cast: Aiko Melendez, Jane Oineza, Wowie De Guzman, Kokoy de Santos, Yesha Camile, Mymy Davao, Alexa Macanan, Brace Arquiza, Zeus Collins, Kyra Custodio
47	"Class Picture"	Nuel C. Naval	Benjamin Benson Logronio, Arah Jell Badayos	December 12, 2015
Bert is a man with X-linked Dystonia Parkinsonism (XDP) or Lubag Syndrome, which causes stuttering, difficulty walking and writing, and involuntary movements of the muscles in different parts of the body. Cast: Gerald Anderson, Snooky Serna, Trina Legaspi, Archie Alemania, Raikko Mateo, Bodjie Pascua, Angelo Ilagan, Ronalisa Cheng, Veyda Inoval, Karla Cruz, Lollie Mara, Lui Manansala, Elaine Quemuel, Hiyasmin Neri, Mike Lloren, Dale Baldillo, EJ Jallorina, Kyle Banzon
48	"Parol" "Christmas Lantern"	Arah Jell Badayos, Arah Jell Badayos	Raz de la Torre	December 19, 2015
Renita, the wife of an overseas Filipino worker named Rolando, who left his passion for making parols to work abroad. Cast: Zoren Legaspi, Gelli de Belen, Allan Paule, Susan Africa, Ricardo Cepeda, Almira Muhlach, Louise Abuel, Francis Magundayao, Zeppi Borromeo, Gilleth Sandico, Tart Carlos, Levi Ignacio, Carlo Lacana, Winryll Banaag, Micko Laurente, John Michael, Jonic Magno
49	"Rosas" "Rose"	Jerry Lopez Sineneng	Joan Habana, Arah Jell Badayos	December 26, 2015
Resty was in high school then while Charito just finished college when they became lovers. Despite having a five year age gap and despite the disapproval of Charito's family, the two still followed their hearts and continued their relationship. They eventually elope and Resty works hard to prove that he can be a good provider for the family he and Charito will build. As years pass, Charito's family learns to accept Resty but little did the couple know that the ultimate test for their love is yet to come. Cast: Vina Morales, Ejay Falcon, Meg Imperial, John Manalo, Encar Benedicto, Carla Martinez, Neil Coleta, Marlann Flores, Rochelle Barrameda, Noel Colet, Bing Davao, Jef Gaitan, Jacob Dionisio, Claire Ruiz, John Bermundo, Raine Salamante, Zonia Mejia
