= Maalaala Mo Kaya season 22 =

Maalaala Mo Kaya
- Season 22
- Starring: Charo Santos
- No. of episodes: 49

Release
- Original network: ABS-CBN
- Original release: January 4 – December 27, 2014

Season chronology
- ← Previous; Season 21 Next → Season 23

Maalaala Mo Kaya (transl. Would you remember?; abbreviated MMK), also known as Memories in English, is a Filipino television series, which was first aired on May 15, 1991. MMK is the longest-running drama anthology on Philippine television.

== Episodes ==
#	Episode title	Directed by	Written by	Original air date
155	"Dos Por Dos"	Raz Dela Torre	Benjamin Benson Logronio, Arah Jell Badayos	January 4, 2014
The story of a gay parent in this heavy drama episode. Jess is who became a mother to six kids abandoned by their parents. How can a gay man give to his "children" the love and care he was not able to have from his own mother? Cast: Arjo Atayde, Assunta de Rossi, Ella Cruz, Felix Roco, Eliza Pineda, Jiriane Montilla, Dindo Arroyo, Kyle Banzon, Ismael Clavero, Via Veloso, Mike Lloren
156	"Marriage Contract"	Garry Fernando	Mary Rose Colindres, Arah Jell Badayos	January 11, 2014
A story about a devoted wife and mother. Feel Elena's pain when she discovers that her ideal husband Leo turned out to be married to someone else. Can Elena give up her dream family and let go of her greatest love or will she give in to her husband's plea to save their relationship? Cast: Maricar Reyes, Ariel Rivera, Katya Santos, Jenny Miller, Encar Benedicto, Jennifer Mendoza, Gem Ramos, Eunice Lagusad, Miguel Vergara, Mike Austria, Minco Fabregas
157	"Harmonica"	Raz Dela Torre	Benjamin Benson Logronio, Arah Jell Badayos	January 18, 2014
A family drama episode. Gloria is a devoted mother who was forced to abandon her kids to work in another town. What did Gloria do that made her children hate her so much? Cast: Sharlene San Pedro, John Manalo, Aiko Melendez, Cris Villanueva, Ces Quesada, Maliksi Morales, Daisy Reyes, Lorenzo Mara, Amy Nobleza, Dexie Daulat
158	"Santan"	Garry Fernando	Arah Jell Badayos	January 25, 2014
The story of a cheerful and loving mother Neneng, who suddenly gets hooked in texting a young guy named Janus. What pushed a dedicated housewife to escape from her "real life" and give her time to a total stranger? Cast: K Brosas, Dennis Padilla, Khalil Ramos, Aleck Bovick, Wendy Valdez, Emmanuelle Vera, Gemmae Custodio, Paul Salas, Zeppi Borromeo, Moi Bien, Liezel Garcia, Mico Aytona, Harvey Bautista
159	"Pagkain" "Food"	Raz Dela Torre	Cyrus Dan L. Cañares, Arah Jell Badayos	February 1, 2014
The inspiring journey of award-winning actress Iza Calzado towards a "lighter" life. Witness how an insecure girl bravely faced her problems and resolved her obesity issues. Living in a broken family, how did Iza empower herself to win her personal battle with her weight? How did her seemingly simple weight problem became a crucial turning point in her life? Cast: Empress Schuck, Dimples Romana, Christian Vasquez, Joross Gamboa, Ina Feleo, Belle Mariano, Erin Ocampo, Elisse Joson
160	"Itak" "Bolo"	Nuel Crisostomo Naval	Joan Habana, Arah Jell Badayos	February 8, 2014
A pre-Valentine's Day episode that tells of the amusing love story of Tirso and Sheryl. Tirso was a big, big fan of one of the most popular singers-actresses during the 1980s - Sheryl Cruz. He was such a big fan that he all he wanted for a girlfriend was someone who looks like his idol. However, his father had someone else in mind for him. He introduced Tirso to a girl who looks the complete opposite of Sheryl Cruz and even wanted him to marry her. To avoid his father's trap which will make him lose the chance of marrying the girl of his dreams, he was forced to leave their home and settle somewhere far from his family. Then, he met Sheryl. As fate would have it, he would later fall in love with his idol's namesake, who, to him, is also as beautiful as her. Although his love had been reciprocated, their love story wouldn't easily have a happy ending. They would have to go through a difficult "Romeo and Juliet" journey, with Sheryl's father doing everything that he can to separate them from each other. What will Tirso do to stand up and fight for his love for Sheryl? How can he prove that he deserves Sheryl's love? Cast: Sam Concepcion, Ynna Asistio, Malou Crisologo, Noel Colet, William Lorenzo, Giselle Sanchez, Gilleth Sandico, CJ Navato
161	"Gitara" "Guitar"	Garry Fernando	Benjamin Benson Logronio, Arah Jell Badayos	February 15, 2014
A Valentine's Day episode about the story of Maynard, a playboy who captures the heart of Zandrae, a girl who grew up with a lot of insecurities due to her dark skin tone and non-supportive family. Feeling loved and valued by Maynard, Zandrae will let her world around him. What will Zandrae do when she discovers that the guy she loves is just playing with her? Cast: Xian Lim, Bangs Garcia, Nadia Montenegro, Louella de Cordova, Helga Krapf, David Chua, Joyce So, Denisse Aguilar, Dawn Jimenez, Justin Gonzales, Kazel Kinouchi, Hannah Flores, Vangie Martelle, Ben Isaac
162	"Card"	Raz Dela Torre	Joan Habana, Arah Jell Badayos	February 22, 2014
The story of rival honor students Neneng and Celo, who will eventually find themselves bound by love. How will their love-hate relationship lead to romance? Will competition reignite between them once one of them gets more successful than the other? Cast: Janella Salvador, Marlo Mortel, Dominic Ochoa, Rochelle Barrameda, Diego Loyzaga, Lander Vera Perez, Almirah Muhlach, Veyda Inoval, Kyle Banzon, Joshua Colet
163	"Arroz Caldo"	Garry Fernando	Rose Colindres, Arah Jell Badayos	March 1, 2014
Mely is a martyr wife to her philandering husband and a dedicated mother to her beloved children. Since Mely does not want her children to grow up in a broken family, she keeps her husband's infidelity to herself. How did Mely manage to hide the truth from her children for 15 years? Cast: Pokwang, Emilio Garcia, Jun Urbano, Beauty Gonzalez, Marco Gumabao, Celine Lim, Idda Yaneza, Aaron Junatas, Brian Poe, Jef Gaitan, Lance Lucido, Althea Guanzon
164	"Seashells"	Emmanuel Q. Palo	Arah Jell Badayos	March 8, 2014
The story features a young girl named Jenny who grew up craving the love and care of her working parents. Because no one is closely looking after her welfare, Jenny is raped at the age of seven by their laundry-woman's live-in partner. For her to be able to overcome the mental and psychological trauma of the vicious assault, Jenny's father entrusts Jenny to her grandparents, who live far from them. Cast: Abby Bautista, Pen Medina, Gloria Diaz, Precious Lara Quigaman, James Blanco, Kathleen Hermosa, Junjun Quintana
165	"Bahay" "House"	Garry Fernando	Arlene Tamayo, Arah Jell Badayos	March 15, 2014
Brothers Okoy and Luman have a promise to be at each other's side for the rest of their lives. Driven by their dream of building their own house, Okoy works hard and sacrifices almost everything to help his younger brother finish his studies. How will Okoy accept that his beloved brother, whom he has taken care of all his life, has given up on him at his most trying time? Cast: Jason Abalos, Dominic Roque, Dianne Medina, Maliksi Morales, CX Navarro, JM Ibañez, Mymy Davao, Mike Austria
166	"Mikropono" "Microphone"	Mae Czarina Cruz	Joan Habana, Arah Jell Badayos	March 22, 2014
The ROSE FOSTANES STORY. It will inspire viewers to pursue their dreams through the life story of X Factor Israel first grand winner, Rose Osang Fostanes. Discover the trials faced and the sacrifices made by Osang just to support her family. From joining amateur singing contests, Osang decided to work abroad to give her loved ones a better life. She worked in Dubai, Egypt, Lebanon, and lastly in Israel. How did Osang rekindle her love for singing? Is it true that she almost lost hope in X Factor Israel because of being overweight and middle-aged? Cast: Viveika Ravanes, Irma Adlawan, John Arcilla, Barbie Sabino, Tina Paner, Shey Bustamante, Franco Daza, Niña Dolino, Ronalisa Cheng, Marikit Morales, Louise Bernardo
167	"Kwintas" "Necklace"	Raz Dela Torre	Benjamin Benson Logronio, Arah Jell Badayos	March 29, 2014
An episode that will tell a story about REUNITED LOVERS. Angie and Bert are former lovers who get their second chance at love after their respective spouses' deaths. Cast: Coney Reyes, Bembol Roco, Tommy Abuel, Jane Oineza, Yves Flores, Ingrid dela Paz, Joshua Dionisio, Jobelle Salvador, Devon Seron, Patrick Sugui, Jeffrey Hidalgo, Nene Tamayo, Claire Ruiz, Sofia Andres, Marcky Billiones
168	"Orasan" "Clock"	Mae Czarina Cruz	Joan Habana, Arah Jell Badayos	April 5, 2014
The story of Jhonny and Aileen who fell in love during their summer job. Everything seems so right for the two until Aileen starts to demand so much time from Jhonny even though Jhonny is studying and working then at the same time. Cast: Enchong Dee, Liza Soberano, Marc Solis, Hyubs Azarcon, Bernadette Allyson, Jon Lucas
168	"Bus"	Nuel Crisostomo Naval	Nikki Bunquin, Arah Jell Badayos	April 12, 2014
Despite her family dismay over her May–December love affair with Ernesto, Jhenny takes the risk of continuing her relationship with the middle-aged bus driver, who promises to love her no matter what. Cast: Empress Schuck, Joey Marquez, Snooky Serna, Simon Ibarra, Ynez Veneracion, Carla Guevara, Paco Evangelista, Louise Bernardo
169	"Cellphone"	Garry Fernando	Arah Jell Badayos	April 26, 2014
Bambi is a mother who promised to herself to never control her daughter's life like the way her father did to her. However, from simple gestures of helping Donna gain friends through texting, Bambi eventually gets so involved with the love life of her daughter that everything needs to pass through her approval. How can a child make her mother realize that she is old enough to live her life by herself? Cast: Vina Morales, Benjie Paras, Ingrid dela Paz, Rez Cortez, Janice Jurado, CJ Navato, Bryan Homecillo, Alex Diaz, Markki Stroem, AJ Muhlach, Bianca Casado, Elisse Joson, Vangie Martell
170	"Tutong" "Burnt Rice"	Nuel C. Naval	Arah Jell Badayos, Joan Habana	May 3, 2014
Jose is an eight-year-old boy who stands as a parent to his seven younger siblings after their mother and father abandoned them. Jose brings his one-month-old sibling with him when he goes to school. And every time his youngest sibling cries, Jose, with his brother in his arms, runs to a room in the school and asks alms from his teachers. What inspires a child like Jose to stand up and raise his little siblings? What will Jose do when his mother comes back after so many years? Cast: Bugoy Cariño, Izzy Canillo, Desiree del Valle, JB Agustin, Ian De Leon, Perla Bautista, CX Navarro, Beverly Salviejo, Marco Aytona, BJ Forbes, Dexie Daulat
171	"Sanggol" "Baby"	Raz dela Torre	Benjamin Benson Logronio, Arah Jell Budayos	May 10, 2014
Dina is almost living a perfect life when she suddenly learned that her husband Carlo is having an extra-marital affair and that he has two kids with his mistress. Yet despite it all, Dina chose to give her husband a second chance and even took care of his children. How far will she endure for her husband and family? Cast: Carmina Villarroel, Bernard Palanca, Ces Quesada, Boboy Garovillo, Yam Concepcion, Paul Salas, Louise Abuel, Miguel Vergara, Sonjia Calit, Carlo Lacana, Ces Aldaba, John Vincent Servilla, Jhiz Deocareza
172	"Lipstick"	Nuel C. Naval	Benjamin Benson Logronio, Arah Jell Budayos	May 17, 2014
Susan grew in the province, naive of the real working of the world, in love particularly. Boys in their hometown are into her, and she is the subject of gossip among many villagers. Once doing the laundry with neighbors in the river, she asked the older women how it is to be in love. But due to circumstances, the definition of love will be hidden from Susan. She settled down with another villager and their life has never been miserable. But came Andres, the younger brother of her husband. He will teach her what true love is. And she will learn to love her, and regret to have finally come to terms with her emotions in a difficult situation and that was being married. Cast: Angelica Panganiban, Carlo Aquino, Wowie de Guzman, Sharlene San Pedro, Mico Aytona, Madz Nicolas, Tom Olivar, Louise Abuel, Jillian Aguila, Laisa Comia, Allyson Mc Bride, Raine Salamante
173	"Karayom" "Needle"	Emmanuel Q. Palo	Joan Habana, Arah Jell Badayos	May 24, 2014
A story of a young boy suffering from leukemia. Feel the pain of Clark and his mother Julie who is caught in a situation of sacrificing her three other children's health to prolong the life of her eldest son through a bone marrow transplant. Cast: Zaijan Jaranilla, Sunshine Cruz, Dominic Ochoa, Lui Manansala, Biboy Ramirez
174	"Panyo" "Handkerchief"	Theodore Boborol	Benjamin Benson Logronio, Arah Jell Badayos	May 31, 2014
The story of best friends Susan and Cecile, whose friendship is strained because of one guy, Rope, Cecile's ex-boyfriend, who is now courting Susan. Can true love blossom between Susan and Rope amid Cecile's resentment? Cast: Sue Ramirez, Sam Concepcion, Eliza Pineda, Shirley Fuentes, Arnold Reyes, Angeli Gonzales, Karen Reyes, Eunice Lagusad, EJ Jallorina, Annika Gonzales, Joyce So, Alec Dungo, Benjamin de Guzman
175	"Abito" "Cassock"	Garry Fernando	Mark Duane Angos, Arah Jell Badayos	June 7, 2014
Fr. Efren "Momoy" Borromeo, a renowned healing priest has been blessed to have a gift of healing sick people and see the souls of the departed. What were the hardest trials that put his faith to the test? Cast: Nonie Buencamino, John Manalo, Malou de Guzman, Juan Rodrigo, Joonee Gamboa, Nanding Josef, Nick Lizaso, Levi Ignacio, Louella de Cordova, Mike Austria, Maila Gumila, Encar Benedicto, Lemuel Pelayo, Josef Elizalde, Tom Doromal, Jacob Dionisio, Paolo Santiago, Kyle Banzon, Nathaniel Britt, Anita Linda, Odette Khan
176	"Notebook"	Nuel Crisostomo Naval	Benjamin Benson Logronio, Arah Jell Badayos	June 14, 2014
A relatable high school barkada story of teenagers with conflicting personalities, namely, Sheree, Kay, and Joy, respectively, who form their SheKaJoy Angels barkada at school. Will the friendship be over when one member of the group breaks one of their rules by getting pregnant? Cast: Yen Santos, Kiray Celis, Trina Legaspi, Minnie Aguilar, Khaycee Aboloc, Cheska Billiones, Justin Gonzales, Paolo Angeles, Marithez Samson
177	"Longboard"	Raz Dela Torre	Mark Duane Angos, Arah Jell Badayos	June 21, 2014
A father-and-son family drama episode. Bibi is the protective father of Dandoy. Bibi yearns for his son to finish his studies. But their relationship is soon put to test when Dandoy stops schooling to concentrate on his hobby, long boarding. How can a son prove to his father that he made the right decision Cast: Jairus Aquino, Zoren Legaspi, Assunta De Rossi, Yves Flores, JB Agustin, Lance Lucido, Marc Solis, Joe Vargas
178	"Jeep"	Eric Quizon	Joan Habana, Arah Jell Badayos	June 28, 2014
The story of Berna, who comes from a rich family and who is an academic achiever. She aspires for a better life and longs to marry a man who can provide her that. But after college, Berna meets and falls in love with Mark, a handsome and hardworking jeepney conductor. With her family's disapproval, how far can Berna go to fight for her love for Mark? Cast: Shaina Magdayao, Ejay Falcon, Sheryl Cruz, Matet de Leon, Vandolph Quizon, Melai Cantiveros, Gerald Madrid, Ron Morales, Almira Muhlach, Cris Villonco, Kitkat, Kit Thompson, Carlo Romero, Wendy Tabusalla
179	"Boxing Gloves"	Garry Fernando	Benjamin Benson Logronio	July 5, 2014
At a young age, Nikki already dreamt of becoming a boxer because he saw it as a way to give his family a better life. But instead of boxing, fate led him to the dangerous world of street fighting. Why did Nikki find himself hooked with such an illegal sport? Will he stop risking his life in street fights once his family asks him to do so? Cast: Jason Abalos, Dimples Romana, Lito Pimentel, Archie Alemania, Miguelito de Guzman, Celine Lim, Laiza Comia, Manuel Chua, Thou Reyes, Zeppi Borromeo, Josh Ivan Morales, Marx Topacio, Ogie Escanilla, John Vincent Servilla
180	"Baston" "Cane"	Nuel Crisostomo Naval	Joan Habana	July 12, 2014
An inspiring story of a visually impaired model-beauty queen named Jessa. Inheriting her mother's glaucoma and losing her eyesight at the age of 18, Jessa grew up being bullied in school. But she became a source of inspiration to other blind students and other people, especially when she was crowned Miss Philippines on Vision 2013. Cast: Erich Gonzales, Irma Adlawan, William Lorenzo, Nina Ricci Alagao, Nikki Bagaporo, Abby Bautista, Patrick Sugui, Dionne Monsanto, Joe Gruta, Amy Robles, Carla Guevarra, Ogie Escanilla, Koreen Medina, Louise Bernardo, Bianca Bentulan
181	"Train"	Garry Fernando	Benjamin Benson Logronio	July 19, 2014
The life story of the girl behind a viral YouTube video Paula Jamie "PJ" Salvosa, better known as the "Amalayer" girl. Despite growing up without a mother, PJ never felt any loss because the love of her father and grandparents made her complete. However, the darkest moments of her life descended on her when she became a victim of cyber bullying because of one mistake. How hard was it for PJ when she was criticized and tormented by people who barely knew her? How did she learn to accept and forgive herself and the people who hurt her? Cast: Angeline Quinto, Cris Villanueva, Kean Cipriano, Liza Lorena, Chinggoy Alonzo, Casey Da Silva, Phoemela Baranda, Liza Diño, Pamu Pamorada, Wendy Valdez
182	"Wedding Gown"	Nuel Crisostomo Naval	Denise O’Hara, Arah Jell Badayos	July 26, 2014
The inspiring love story of Hazzy and Liezel Go which the whole world witnessed through their touching wedding video. It now has almost 12 million views on YouTube a month after it was uploaded. Discover the story behind that viral video dubbed as the "heartbreaking wedding" of Hazzy, a 29-year-old patient diagnosed with advanced stage 4 liver cancer, and his girlfriend of four years, Liezel. Know why they had to rush tying the knot while Hazzy was confined in the hospital.Can eternal love blossom when your beloved's days are numbered? Cast: Carlo Aquino, Kaye Abad, Janice de Belen, Mico Aytona, Aldred Gatchalian, Minco Fabregas, RJ Ledesma, Shey Bustamante, Erin Ocampo, DM Sevilla
183	"Stars"	Raz Dela Torre	Benjamin Benson Logronio, Arah Jell Badayos	August 2, 2014
The story of teenagers Che and Mark who have a "mutual understanding" relationship. Although they are not officially in a romantic relationship, Che and Mark feel love and contentment in their lives. Everything seems to be perfect until Mark admits to Che that he has fallen in love with another girl who is pregnant with his child. Che is heartbroken. Is moving on possible for Che when everything constantly reminds her of Mark and their happy times together? Can she forgive someone who has given her so much joy but has caused so much pain at the same time? Cast: Miles Ocampo, Khalil Ramos, Francis Magundayao, Mikylla Ramirez, Sofia Andres, Ana Capri, Devon Seron, Micah Muñoz, Claire Ruiz
184	"Saklay" "Crutches"	Garry Fernando	Joan Habana	August 9, 2014
The inspiring story of Johnny Medrano, one of the finalists of Gawad Geny Lopez Jr. Bayaning Pilipino 2014, who supports his family and serves his community despite an orthopedic impairment that rendered him unable to walk. Discover how a differently abled man who experienced discrimination, maltreatment, and physical abuse from other people found the courage to live a normal life, and how he helped other differently abled people who have become victims of social injustice. Cast: Xian Lim, Joey Marquez, Isay Alvarez, Izzy Canillo, Ynna Asistio, Kyline Alcantara, Bodjie Pascua, Janice Jurado, Peewee O'Hara, Mary Joy Dalo, Mike Austria, Raine Salamante
185	"Red Envelope"	Nuel Crisostomo Naval	Benjamin Benson Logronio, Arah Jell Badayos	August 16, 2014
The touching life story of the first grand champion of "The Voice Kids Philippines," Lyca Gairanod. Lyca, a small kid with big dreams from Tanza, Cavite, gained popularity for her heartfelt, amazing performances in "The Voice Kids" and humble background as a daughter of a fisherman. She would also sometimes help her mother scavenge for junk to sell. Cast: Malou de Guzman, Ronnie Lazaro, EJ Jallorina, Kokoy De Santos, Gilleth Sandico, Amy Nobleza, Marney Lapuz, Che Ramos, Lyca Gairanod
186	"Alak" "Liquor"	Garry Fernando	Mark Duane Angos, Arah Jell Badayos	August 23, 2014
The story of mother and son, Lui and Paul, who are forced to make ends meet for their family after Lui's father, Eddie, was struck with a serious illness. How did Paul manage to finish on top of his class amid all the financial and emotional trials that he and his family had to face? Cast: Enchong Dee, Pokwang, Robert Seña, JB Agustin, Elisse Joson, Carlo Lacana, Sonjia Calit, Phoebe Arbotante, Amante Pulido, Jayme Jalandoni
187	"Sulat" "Letter"	Garry Fernando	Joan Habana, Arah Jell Badayos	August 30, 2014
Discover the extraordinary love story of Marie, who has dreamt of becoming a nun since she was young. She has never entertained guys who wanted to court her. But not until Marie meets Nick, her first love whom she thought she will forget once she enters the monastery. Cast: Jessy Mendiola, Edgar Allan Guzman, Teresa Loyzaga, Lloyd Samartino, Francine Prieto, Carla Martinez, Loudella de Cordova, Karen Dematera, Myrtle Sarrosa, AJ Muhlach, Lemuel Pelayo, Alex Diaz, Ashley Sarmiento, Chienna Filomena
188	"Kumot" "Blanket"	Denise O’Hara, Arah Jell Badayos	Mae Czarina Cruz	September 6, 2014
A story about the horrifying experience of a girl named Leng who was raped by her own father at the young age of 13. What will a sexually abused child think of her mother who does not believe her at all? Is a normal life possible for someone who had such a traumatic experience? Will she ever trust her family and believe in love again? Cast: Bangs Garcia, Ella Cruz, Jestoni Alarcon, Daisy Reyes, Alex Castro, Joshua Zamora, Tanya Gomez, Veyda Innoval, Kazumi Porquez, Laisa Comia Shane Hermogenes, John Vincent Servilla
189	"Selfie"	Nuel Crisostomo Naval	Arah Jell Badayos	September 13, 2014
Hiro Mallari is a teenage boy whose life turned upside down when he lost his one true love, Michelle Ann "Mitch" Bonzo in a tragic accident. Mitch was one of the seven Bulacan State University students who died after they were swept away in the Madlum River during a school field trip in Bulacan. Cast: Janella Salvador, Manolo Pedrosa, CJ Navato, Pinky Amador, Jobelle Salvador, Lollie Mara, Racquel Montesa, Trina Legaspi, Yves Flores, Shy Carlos
190	"Palayan" "Paddy Field"	Nuel Crisostomo Naval	Benjamin Benson Logronio, Arah Jell Badayos	September 20, 2014
The story Igge a good-hearted son who took on the role of father to his half-siblings after their mother died. What will Igge do when, after all his sacrifices, his siblings decide to leave him? Cast: Jake Cuenca, Assunta De Rossi, Louise Abuel, John Manalo, Meg Imperial, Angelo Ilagan, Juan Rodrigo, Christopher Roxas, Lui Villaruz, Junjun Quintana, Inah Estrada, Angeli Gonzales
191	"Picture"	Garry Fernando	Benjamin Benson Logronio, Arah Jell Badayos	September 27, 2014
"The Voice Kids Philippines" second runner-up Juan Karlos "JK" Labajo will inspire the viewers through his life story. When did JK realize he wanted to become a singer? How did he manage to wow the three coaches despite the fact that he lost his mother five days before his audition in "The Voice Kids?" Cast: Juan Karlos Labajo, Ces Quesada, Janus del Prado, Phoemela Baranda, Jeric Raval, Miguel Vergara
192	"Birth Certificate"	Nick Olanka	Joan Habana, Arah Jell Badayos	October 4, 2014
Joshua, at the age of 6, left his family in Antique with the hope of having a better life. But after feeling lonely in the custody of his strict aunt, Joshua decided to run away. From then on, he experienced the harsh reality of life in the urban streets and squatter areas of Antipolo. How did Joshua manage to pursue his education despite sheer poverty? Cast: Louise Abuel, Aiko Melendez, John Arcilla, Shamaine Buencamino, Odette Khan, Benjamin de Guzman, Boboy Garovillo, Glenda Garcia, Emmanuelle Vera, Jed Montero, Maritess Samson, Gerald Pesigan, Kyle Banzon, John Vincent Servilla, Brace Arquiza, Winryll Banaag
193	"Sim Card"	Nuel Crisostomo Naval	Benjamin Benson Logronio, Arah Jell Badayos	October 11, 2014
Joven is a young man who managed to avoid his gay admirer through the help of his pretend girlfriend, Rachel. Can Joven and Rachel's make-believe relationship develop into true love? Cast: JM De Guzman, Nadine Samonte, Neil Coleta, Karen Reyes, Kim Molina, Paco Evangelista, Almira Muhlach, Elaine Quemuel, Dawn Jimenez, Aina Solano
194	"Lobo" "Balloon"	Garry Fernando	Joan Habana, Arah Jell Badayos	October 18, 2014
Cast: Nonie Buencamino, Mickey Ferriols, Dhexie Daulat, Eva Darren, Tony Mabesa, Maila Gumila, Jong Cuenco, Encar Benedicto, Lui Manansala, Alfred Labatos, Yogo Singh, Maris Racal
195	"Bonnet"	Raz Dela Torre	Benjamin Benson Logronio, Arah Jell Badayos	October 25, 2014
When Paolo is diagnosed with leukemia, he becomes cynical and loses his will to live, thinking that sooner or later, he will still die. Paolo is at his lowest point when he meets Rovil, whose leukemia is much worse than his. But, unlike Paolo, Rovil is optimistic that she will overcome her illness. She teaches Paolo to value every moment they are alive by living life to the fullest and making unforgettable happy memories. How can a terminal disease give Rovil and Paolo their little infinity? Is love enough to bravely face death? Cast: Jane Oineza, Marlo Mortel, Andrea Del Rosario, Jenny Miller, Suzette Ranillo, Justin Cuyugan, Tess Antonio, Patrick Sugui, Bryan Homecillo, Mariel Pamintuan, Cheska Billiones, Deydey Amansec
196	"Nurse's Cap"	Raz de la Torre	Arah Jell Badayos, Benjamin Benson Logronio	November 8, 2014
Fatima Palma gained online fame when a video of her entertaining a patient in the hospital with her rap performance went viral. Cast: Maxene Magalona, Bembol Roco, Shamaine Buencamino, Kathleen Hermosa, Joseph Bitangcol, Jon Lucas, Francis Magundayao, Rochelle Barrameda, Ana Roces, Via Veloso, Gilleth Sandico, Carlos Salazar
197	"Pedicab"	Garry Fernando	Joan Habana, Arah Jell Badayos	November 15, 2014
When one of the prison gates collapsed because of the typhoon, Jomar immediately thought of his family's safety. He then did his best to search and rescue them. But upon reaching home, he had to face his worst nightmare: his mother and three other siblings were killed by the typhoon. Despite his mourning, Jomar chose to rebuild their house and made ways to give his beloved family members a decent funeral. After his mother and siblings were laid to rest, Jomar did not take advantage of the incidental freedom caused by the tragedy. With his innate goodness, he decided to do the right thing and surrendered himself back to the prison. Cast: Ejay Falcon, Sharmaine Arnaiz, Lito Pimentel, JB Agustin, Sofia Millares, Althea Guanzon, Nico Antonio, Michael Roy Jornales, Gerhard Acao, Art Acuña, Boom Labrusca, Veyda Inoval, Casey da Silva, Erin Ocampo, Ana Abad-Santos, Jhiz Deocareza, Roy Requejo, Patricia Coma, Angelou Adlao Alayao
198	"Manika" "Doll"	Raz Dela Torre	Benjamin Benson Logronio, Arah Jell Badayos	November 22, 2014
Cynthia is a loving wife and mother who puts her family's welfare over her happiness. She wants her family intact so much that she endures her miserable life with her abusive husband who is unreasonably jealous, overprotective and possessive even with their children. Will Cynthia find the courage to stand up for her children when she discovers they have become victims of domestic abuse by their own father? Cast: Sunshine Cruz, Gardo Versoza, Sue Ramirez, Janus del Prado, Maria Isabel Lopez, Nikki Valdez, Kristel Fulgar, Joshua Dionisio, Jeffrey Hidalgo, Nathaniel Britt, Alexa Macanan, Kyline Alcantara, Mitch Naco, Onse Tolentino, Jacob Benedicto
199	"Diary"	Raz Dela Torre	Benjamin Benson Logronio, Arah Jell Badayos	November 29, 2014
With her father's strict upbringing, Karen promises herself that she will never disobey her parents and will never be in love. But her world turns around when she meets and befriends Christian - her first love. But since she is afraid to confess her real feelings for Christian, Karen finds contentment in writing her emotions and messages of love in her diary. Will Christian discover Karen's well-kept secret? What will Karen do once she discovers that her first love is already committed to someone else? Cast: Julia Barretto, Iñigo Pascual, Jeffrey Quizon, Arlene Muhlach, Inah Estrada, Claire Ruiz, Trina Legaspi, Chienna Filomeno, Celine Lim, Aldred Nasayao
200	"Liham" "Letter"	Elfren Parpan Vibar	Joan Habana, Arah Jell Badayos	December 6, 2014
The world of Fr. Francis begins to change when he meets the charming and confident nun named Joanna, who asked him to get involved in a non-government organization that sympathizes with radical groups. From being simple acquaintances who march together to Mendiola, Fr. Francis and Sis. Joanna became good friends as they enjoy lengthy talks about their vocation, their common cause of helping and serving other people and their personal lives. As they appreciate and enjoy each other's company every single time, Fr. Francis and Sis. Joanna's friendship developed into a special kind of love, which pushed Sis. Joanna to leave her vocation to save his beloved from leaving priesthood. What will happen when Fr. Francis discovers Sis. Joanna's sacrifice? How will their love for each other further deepen their relationship with the Lord? Cast: Arjo Atayde, Yen Santos, Gio Alvarez, Abby Bautista, Melissa Mendez, Aleck Bovick, Bodjie Pascua, Minco Fabregas, Jopay Paguia, Rubi Rubi, Dale Baldillo, Jerry O'Hara, Peewee O'Hara
201	"Bukid" "Field"	Garry Fernando	Benjamin Benson Logronio, Arah Jell Badayos	December 13, 2014
Leng can't help but fall in love with her serious and strict boss Ronnie, a single parent to two children. How did Ronnie and Leng's secret love affair start? What will they do when Ronnie's family goes against their relationship? Cast: Diether Ocampo, Yam Concepcion, Raikko Mateo, Tetchie Agbayani, Robert Seña, Tanya Gomez
202	"Salamin" "Mirror"	Mae Cruz-Alviar	Mary Rose Colindres, Arah Jell Badayos	December 20, 2014
At 5 years old, Rochelle's body was overtaken by progeria, a rare genetic condition that causes a child's body to show signs of aging. She was told by her doctor that she could expect to live only up to 15 years old. As the sad truth settles in Rochelle's mind, she decides to live her short life to the fullest and experience things normal people experience-including falling in love. Will love keep Rochelle's high hopes to live, or will it cause her more pain? Cast: Xyriel Manabat, Aiko Melendez, Paul Salas, Ian de Leon, Maggie dela Riva, Eva Darren, Dang Cruz, Crispin Pineda, Carlo Lacana, Paulo Angeles, Ismael Clavero, JM Ibañez, Maritess Samson
