= Johan Santos =

Filipino actor

Johan Morielle Santos
- Born: Johan Morielle Santos; June 1, 1987 (age 39); Tarlac City, Tarlac, Philippines
- Education: Lyceum of the Philippines University
- Occupations: Actor, model, presenter
- Years active: 2005–2017
- Agents: GMA Artist Center (2005–2007); Star Magic (2007–2017)
- Height: 172 cm (5 ft 8 in)
- Partner: Eileen Gonzales (2015)
- Children: Zohan Miguel (Son)

Johan Morielle Santos (born June 1, 1987) is a Filipino television actor, presenter, and model who participated in 133 episodes of Philippine reality show Pinoy Big Brother: Double Up.

== Background ==
Santos was a student of the Lyceum of the Philippines University - Manila before he joined PBB. After two years on the series StarStruck, Santos joined the cast of the 2010 spinoff series Melason In Love. A restaurant server, Santos was a former contestant of the reality series Pinoy Big Brother: Double Up, and crowned fourth "Big Placer" on Day 133.

He currently resides in Quezon City.

== Filmography ==
=== Television ===
Year	Title	Role
2005–2006	StarStruck: The Nationwide Invasion	Himself / Starstruck Avenger
2006	Love to Love Season 12: Jazz Got Lucky	Greg
2009–2010	Pinoy Big Brother: Double Up	Housemate; 4th Big Placer
2010	Melason	Himself
2010	Your Song Presents: Isla	Johan
2010	Precious Hearts Romances Presents: Love Me Again	Donato "Donnie" Pilapil
2010	Maalaala Mo Kaya: Funeral Parlor	Brother of Mabel
2010	Wansapanataym: Inday Bote	Binoy
2010	Kokey @ Ako	Mike
2011	Laugh Out Loud	Himself
2011	Precious Hearts Romances Presents: Mana Po	Red Kiping
2011	Maalaala Mo Kaya: Tumba-Tumba	Freddie
2011	Maria La Del Barrio	Kent
2012	Oka Tokat	Young Inong
2012	Maalaala Mo Kaya: Belo	Guest
2012	Precious Hearts Romances Presents: Lumayo Ka Man Sa Akin	Ronnie
2012	Kung Ako'y Iiwan Mo	Michael
2012	Precious Hearts Romances Presents: Hiyas	Bimbo
2012	Be Careful With My Heart	Wilson De Juan
2012	Kahit Puso'y Masugatan	Winston
2013	Maalaala Mo Kaya: Drawing	Arnel
2013	Annaliza	Julius
2013	Carlo J. Caparas' Dugong Buhay	Paco
2013	Maalaala Mo Kaya: Mask	Oliver
2013	Honesto	Jacob
2014	The Legal Wife	Vincent "Vince" Madriaga
2015	Flordeliza	Miguel Fontanillas
2015	Bridges of Love	Enrique Hidalgo
2015	Pasión De Amor	Young Lazaro Garcia
2015	Pinoy Big Brother: 737	Houseguest
2016	Tubig at Langis	Bryan
2016	Maalaala Mo Kaya: Korona	Richard
2017	The Better Half	Louie
2017	La Luna Sangre	Rafael Borreros

=== Film ===
Year	Title	Role
2012	My Cactus Heart	Waiter
2012	The Healing (film)	Cameo
2013	Girl, Boy, Bakla, Tomboy	Cameo

== Awards and nominations ==
Year	Award giving body	Category	Nominated work	Results
2010	24th PMPC Star Awards for TV	Best New Male TV Personality	Precious Hearts Romances Presents: Love Me Again	Won
