= Dugong Buhay =

2013 Philippine television drama series

- Title card
- Also known as: Carlo J. Caparas' Dugong Buhay; Raging Blood
- Genre: Action; Revenge; Romance
- Created by: ABS-CBN Studios
- Based on: Dugong Buhay by Carlo J. Caparas
- Developed by: ABS-CBN Studios; Ginny Monteagudo-Ocampo (executive in charge of production)
- Written by: Nikki Jane Bunquin; Danilo Niño Calalang; Cayrus Dan Cañares; Jaymar Castro; Zarah Farcon; Lemuel Garcellano
- Directed by: Toto Natividad
- Starring: Ejay Falcon; Arjo Atayde
- Opening theme: "Pagsubok" by Jovit Baldivino
- Composer: Naldy Padilla of Orient Pearl
- Country of origin: Philippines
- Original language: Filipino
- No. of episodes: 123

Production
- Executive producers: Carlo Katigbak; Cory Vidanes; Laurenti Dyogi; Ginny Monteagudo-Ocampo
- Producers: Marielle de Guzman-Navarro; Aimee Fabian Sumalde; Mel Mendoza-Del Rosario
- Production location: Philippines
- Cinematography: Neil Daza
- Running time: 30 minutes
- Production company: GMO Entertainment Unit

Original release
- Network: ABS-CBN
- Release: April 8 – September 27, 2013

Related
- Dugong Buhay (1983 film)

Dugong Buhay (International title: Raging Blood / transl. Living Blood) is a 2013 Philippine television drama series broadcast by ABS-CBN. The series is based on a 1983 Philippine film of the same title. Directed by Toto Natividad, starring Ejay Falcon and Arjo Atayde. It aired on the network's Kapamilya Gold line up and worldwide on TFC from April 8 to September 27, 2013, replacing Precious Hearts Romances Presents: Paraiso and was replaced by Galema: Anak ni Zuma.

== Plot ==
Victor Bernabe was honed to become the ultimate weapon of revenge against the De Lara clan. But as he immerses in their world, his mission becomes unclear and he finds a family in the arms of his enemies.

== Cast and characters ==
=== Main cast ===
- Ejay Falcon as Victor Bernabe / Gabriel De Lara
- Arjo Atayde as Rafael De Lara
- Yam Concepcion as Sandy De Guzman

=== Supporting cast ===
- Nonie Buencamino as Simon Bernabe
- Lito Pimentel as Pablo De Guzman
- Christian Vasquez as Enrique De Lara
- Ana Capri as Elena Pineda
- Sunshine Cruz as Isabel De Lara
- Ronnie Quizon as Alex De Lara
- Ketchup Eusebio as Christopher "Tope" Bukid
- Jed Montero as Patricia "Trisha" Gonzales

=== Special participation ===
- Maliksi Morales as young Simon Bernabe
- Carlo Aquino as young adult Simon Bernabe
- Cajo Gomez as young Enrique De lara
- Ahron Villena as young adult Enrique De Lara
- Pen Medina as Armando Bernabe
- Arthur Acuña as Ramon De Lara
- Valerie Concepcion as Dolores "Dolor" Bernabe
- Jamilla Obispo as young Elena
- Yen Santos as young Isabel
- Lui Villaruz as young Pablo
- Nico Antonio as young Alex
- Brenna Garcia as young Trisha
- Santino Espinoza as Julian Bernabe
- Justin Navarro as young Rafael
- John Vincent Servilla as young Gabriel/Victor

== Ratings ==
KANTAR MEDIA NATIONAL TV RATINGS (3:30PM PST)
PILOT EPISODE	FINALE EPISODE	SOURCE
11.8%	16.1%	

== See also ==
- List of programs broadcast by ABS-CBN
- List of ABS-CBN Studios original drama series
