= Kathleen Hermosa =

Filipino actress

- Born: Michelle Kathleen Hermosa Orille; April 21, 1981 (age 45)
- Citizenship: Manila, Philippines
- Education: Thames International Business School
- Occupation: Actress
- Years active: 1996–present
- Spouse: Carl Miko Santos (m. 2023)
- Parent(s): Maximillian Orille (father); Maria Alma Hermosa Orille (mother)
- Relatives: Kristine Hermosa (sister); Oyo Boy Sotto (brother-in-law)

Michelle Kathleen Hermosa Orille-Santos (Tagalog pronunciation: [heɾˈmɔsa]; born April 21, 1981) is a Filipino actress. She is the sister of Kristine Hermosa and sister-in-law of Oyo Boy Sotto.

== Career ==
She began her showbiz career in the 1990s, starring in a youth-oriented television series for several years. In the early 2000s, she transitioned to supporting roles in various television dramas across different networks. Among her notable appearances on GMA Network were Anna Karenina (2013) and Cielo de Angelina (2012). In recent years, she has pursued a career outside of entertainment, working as a financial adviser for an insurance company while also managing her own business.

== Filmography ==
=== Television ===
| Year | Title | Role | Notes |
|---|---|---|---|
| 2025 | The Alibi | | Episodes: TBA |
| 2019 | Starla | Frida | |
| 2017 | Ipaglaban Mo: Bangaan | Joy | |
| 2017 | The Good Son | Emma Castillo | |
| 2017 | My Dear Heart | Teresa | |
| 2017 | Doble Kara | Andrea | |
| 2017 | FPJ's Ang Probinsyano | Teresa "Tere" de Vela | |
| 2015 | Nathaniel | Dra. Tessie Robles | |
| 2014 | Ipaglaban Mo: Bumalik sa Kanyang Kabit | Angel | |
| 2013 | Anna Karenina | Rebecca "Becky" Serrano | |
| 2013 | Honesto | Inna | |
| 2012 | Cielo de Angelina | Marilyn Nantes | |
| 2012 | Precious Hearts Romances: Paraiso | Beth | |
| 2012 | Precious Hearts Romances: Lumayo Ka Man sa Akin | Angela | |
| 2012 | Valiente | young Trining | |
| 2009-2010 | Dahil May Isang Ikaw | Charlie Sibal | |
| 2005 | Ikaw ang Lahat sa Akin | Vonnie | |
| 2002-2003 | Kay Tagal Kang Hinintay | Erika | |
| 2001-2003 | Sa Puso Ko Iingatan Ka | Babette | |
| 1997 | Wansapanataym: Tres Marias | | |
| 1996-1999 | Gimik | Melanie's younger sister | |
