= Ahron Villena =

Filipino actor

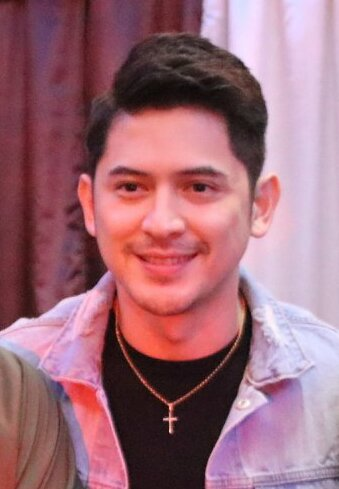
- Villena in 2019
- Born: Roche Ahron Vilena; March 10, 1987 (age 39); San Jose Sico, Batangas City, Philippines
- Other name: Ahron
- Education: Trinity University of Asia
- Occupations: Actor, model
- Years active: 2004–present
- Agents: Star Magic (2004–2010; 2011) Sparkle GMA Artist Center (2024–present); TV5 Network

Ahron Villena (born Roche Ahron Villena on March 10, 1987) is a Filipino actor. He was formerly a member of ABS-CBN's Star Magic and is currently a Sparkle GMA Artist Center artist.

== Career ==
In 2004, he joined and won the ABS-CBN noontime show MTB: Ang Saya-Saya's talent search called TV Idol Ur Da Man on August 21, 2004. Since then, he has appeared in local television dramas, anthology series and movies.

In 2010, he moved from ABS-CBN's rival station GMA Network to join Survivor Philippines: Celebrity Showdown. He currently serves as a Sangguniang Kabataan's Chairman in Brgy. San Jose Sico, Batangas City. Villena attends the Trinity University of Asia in Quezon City with fellow actors Megan Young, Alfred Navarro, Che Tolentino, Charles Christianson, Kontin Roque, Sugar Mercado, Sophia Montecarlo, Erich Gonzales, Alvin Aragon, Eslove Briones, Shey Bustamante, Joe Vargas and Marco Aytona. After Survivor Philippines, he went back to ABS-CBN but has since left the talent management and remains a freelancer.

== Filmography ==
=== Film ===
Year	Title	Role
2005	Happily Ever After	Briggs
2006	You Are the One	
2007	One More Chance	JP
2011	Way Back Home	Jeffrey Santiago
2012	Kimmy Dora and the Temple of Kiyeme	Waiter serving Luisito (as Aaron Villena)
2012	The Reunion	Aldrin
2015	A Second Chance	JP
2015	Beauty and the Bestie	Fishball Vendor
2016	Always Be My Maybe	Mikey
2018	Harry and Patty	Harry / Adonis
2019	Marineros: Men in the Middle of the Sea featuring Mar Vin	

=== Television ===
Year	Title	Role
2004	MTB: Ang Saya-Saya	TV Idol Ur D’Man / Himself
2004	Hiram	William
2006	Gulong ng Palad	Japoy
2008	Lobo	Andrew
2009	Precious Hearts Romances Presents: Bud Brothers	Pio Andong Jr.
2010	Survivor Philippines: Celebrity Showdown	Himself
2011	Pablo S. Gomez's Mutya	Zale
2012	Felina: Prinsesa ng mga Pusa	Yohann
2013	Kahit Konting Pagtingin	Eric Ledesma
2013	Carlo J. Caparas' Dugong Buhay	Young Adult Enrique
2013	Maalaala Mo Kaya: Altar	Daniel
2013	Maalaala Mo Kaya: Rosaryo	Nonoy
2014	The Legal Wife	Jasper Santiago
2014	Hawak-Kamay	Shred De Vera
2015	Pasión de Amor	Fernando Madrigal
2015	Wattpad Presents: Cupid's Fools	Aleph
2016	We Will Survive	Rodel Bernardo
2016	Maalaala Mo Kaya: Silver Medal	Edwin Diaz
2017	The Better Half	Michael Vigamora
2017	FPJ's Ang Probinsyano	Drug Fish Syndicate Dealer
2017	The Promise of Forever	Frederick Borja
2017–2018	La Luna Sangre	Andrew/Omar
2018	Bagani	Kataw
2018	Ipaglaban Mo: Bitin	Richard
2018	Tadhana: Kumare	Victor
2019	Maalaala Mo Kaya: Pregnancy Test	Mitch
2019	Madrasta	Gian Fontanos
2019	Dear Uge	Lorde
2020	Wish Ko Lang: Kutob	Nestor
2021	Paano ang Pangako?	Luis
2021	The Lost Recipe	Father Time (Past, Present and Future)
2021	Niña Niño	Brother Mark
2022	Love in 40 Days	Marco Peñaflor
2025	Mommy Dearest	Jeremy
2025	Akusada	Gian
