= Yves Flores =

Filipino actor (born 1994)

- Born: Yves Romeo Canlas Flores; November 26, 1994 (age 31); Angeles City, Philippines
- Occupations: Actor, model
- Years active: 2012–present
- Agent: Star Magic (2012–present)
- Height: 183 cm (6 ft 0 in)

Yves Romeo Canlas Flores (born November 26, 1994) is a Filipino actor and model born in Angeles City, but grew up in Tarlac City. On April 8, 2012, he joined Pinoy Big Brother: Teen Edition 4 as a housemate. Flores is currently managed by and under contract to Star Magic, ABS-CBN's home based talent agency.

== Personal life ==
Flores was raised in Tarlac City. He grew up as performer and at the age of 18, he joined the Pinoy Big Brother: Teen Edition 4. Flores was evicted from the house on Day 76.

== Career ==
Yves signed a contract in ABS-CBN's Star Magic bottom of the winners Myrtle Sarrosa and Karen Reyes. As the network's and talent agency's artist, Flores had a lot of projects in ABS-CBN. In Forevermore, he stars as Andrew "Drew" Fontanilla. Yves is one of the members of Kapamilya Cuties.

== Filmography ==
=== Web series ===
Year	Title	Role
2021	Stuck On You	John Michael Cruz / "JM" / @alt.media

=== Television ===
Year	Title	Role
2012	ASAP	Himself
2012	Maalaala Mo Kaya: Ilog	Special Participation
2012	Pinoy Big Brother: Teen Edition 4	Himself/Housemate
2012–2013	Princess and I	Dasho Samdrup
2012–2013	Kahit Puso'y Masugatan	Mico
2013–2014	Got to Believe	Pedro
2014	Maalaala Mo Kaya: Selfie	Mark
2014	Sana Bukas pa ang Kahapon	Episode Guest
2014	Ipaglaban Mo: Nang Dahil Sa Utang	Caloy
2014	Maalaala Mo Kaya: Longboard	Bryan
2014	It's Showtime Holy Week Special: The Haydee Mañosca Story	Guest Cast
2014	Maalaala Mo Kaya: Kwintas IV	young Bert
2014–2015	Forevermore	Andrew "Drew" Fontanilla
2015	Kapamilya, Deal or No Deal	Player with Sofia Andres
2015	Ipaglaban Mo: Kapalit ng Pag-ibig	Joaquin
2015	Maalaala Mo Kaya: Computer Shop	Engel
2015	Pinoy Big Brother: 737	Houseguest
2016	Magpahanggang Wakas	Marlon Miranda
2016	Ipaglaban Mo: Pangarap	Tomy
2016	Maalaala Mo Kaya: Karnabal	Ramon
2016	Ipaglaban Mo: Mapusok	Adrian Bermudez
2016	Be My Lady	Julian Crisostomo
2017	Ipaglaban Mo: Tali	Niño Alcantara
2017	Maalaala Mo Kaya: Mansanas at Juice	Roy
2017	Maalaala Mo Kaya: Lifted By Love	George
2017	Ipaglaban Mo!: Kapatiran	Jay-R
2017–2018	Hanggang Saan	Dominic "Domeng" Garibay-Alipio
2018	Maalaala Mo Kaya: Bawang	Christian
2018	Ipaglaban Mo: Bayad	Jasper Toralba
2018	Maalaala Mo Kaya: Pilat	Vhinez
2019	Ipaglaban Mo: Legal Na Ina	Macoy
2019	Ipaglaban Mo: Angkan	Migs
2019	Wansapanataym: Mr. Cutepido	Kiko Piamonte
2019	Ipaglaban Mo: Kuya	Paul Herilla
2020	A Soldier's Heart	Benjamin "Benjie" Arguelles
2020–2021	Bagong Umaga	Eduardo "Dodong" Florentino
2021	Maalaala Mo Kaya: Libro	Ali
2022	2 Good 2 Be True	Alfred “Red” Boscayno
2023	Drag You & Me	TBA
2023	ReTox: 2 Be Continued	Red
2024	What’s Wrong with Secretary Kim	Jordan "Jordy" Agoncillo
2025	Maalaala Mo Kaya	Aido Vasquez
2025–2026	What Lies Beneath	Ryan Mora
2026	Blood vs Duty	Tommy Rosales

=== Films ===
Year	Title	Role
2013	Pagpag: Siyam na Buhay	Bully
2015	WalangForever	Cameo
2015	Just The Way You Are	Andrei
2017	Bloody Crayons	Justin Ybañez
2019	Lola Igna	Tim
2020	Block Z	Gelo
2024	Friendly Fire	Von
2025	In Thy Name	Andrew Bacala
