= Brenna Garcia =

Filipino actress (born 2004)

- Born: Brent Joanne Cristobal Peñaflor; March 8, 2004 (age 22)
- Other names: Brenna, Brenna Garcia
- Occupations: Actress, commercial model, dancer
- Years active: 2011–present
- Agent: Star Magic (2011–present)
- Known for: Star Circle Quest 2011, Galema: Anak Ni Zuma, MMK (Cards Episode), Goin' Bulilit
- Awards: See awards

Brent Joanne Cristobal Peñaflor (born March 8, 2004) commonly known as Brenna and Brenna Garcia is a Filipino actress, dancer and commercial model. Her career started at Star Circle Quest 2011 where she was dubbed as the "Darling Dancer" and won as the Grand Girl Kiddie Superstar. She's a regular cast of ABS-CBN's Sunday kiddie gag show, Goin' Bulilit. She's known for her role as the young Galema on Galema: Anak ni Zuma.

== Filmography ==
=== Television ===
Year	Title	Role
2010	Star Circle Quest	Herself
2011–2016	Goin' Bulilit	Herself
2011	Maalaala Mo Kaya: Piyesa	young Angeline Quinto
2011	Wansapanataym: Darmo Adarna	young Lucy
2011	Wansapanataym: Happy Neo Year	Jenny
2012	Mundo Man ay Magunaw	young Sheryl
2012	E-Boy	Dianne
2012	Princess and I	young Vicky
2012	Wansapanataym: Sandy And The Super Sandok	Lotlot
2012	Wansapanataym: Magic Shoes	Giselle
2012	Maalaala Mo Kaya: Cards	Apple
2013	Minute to Win It	Herself/Player
2013	Carlo J. Caparas' Dugong Buhay	young Trisha
2013	Wansapanataym: Copy Kat	Kat
2013	Maalaala Mo Kaya: VHF Radio	young Brenda
2013	Jim Fernandez's Galema, Anak Ni Zuma	teen Galema
2014	Mars Ravelo's Dyesebel	young Coralia
2014	Hawak Kamay	Erika
2015	Maalaala Mo Kaya: Kamay	young Christine
2015	Maalaala Mo Kaya: Camera	Tybha
2015	Maalaala Mo Kaya: Banana Que	Elha
2016	Maalaala Mo Kaya: Bahay	young Miho
2016	Ipaglaban Mo: Kapitbahay	Cherry
2016	Wansapanataym: Santi Cruz Is Coming To Town	young Nicole
2019	Maalaala Mo Kaya: Jacket	Faith
2019	Maalaala Mo Kaya: Kadena	Abby
2019	Kadenang Ginto	Jenna
2021–22	Hoy, Love You!	Johanna Rose
2026	Rainbow Rumble	Herself/Contestant

=== Film ===
Year	Title	Role
2013	Four Sisters and A Wedding	young Teddy

== Awards and nominations ==
She won the title "Female Grand Kiddie Questor" on ABS-CBN's talent search Star Circle Quest in 2011.

She was nominated for the category Best Single Performance by an Actress at the 26th PMPC Star Awards for Television for her role on Maalaala Mo Kaya episode "Cards". Other nominees include Iza Calzado, Gina Pareño, Angel Aquino and Maricel Soriano. Sylvia Sanchez won the award.
