= Ingrid dela Paz =

Filipino actress

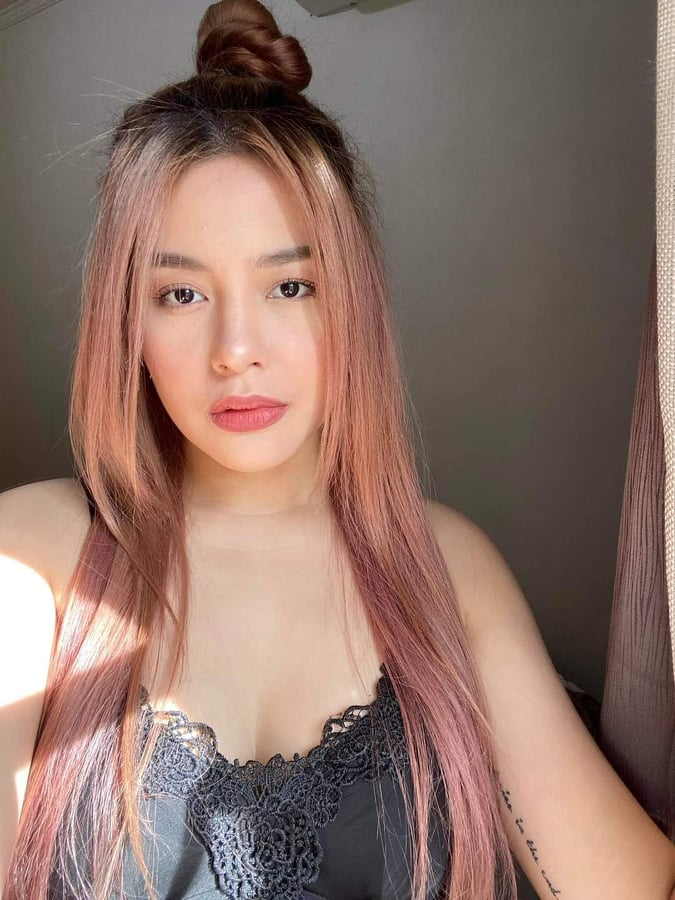
- Born: Ingrid Nicole Moreno dela Paz; April 9, 1994 (age 32); Manila, Philippines
- Other names: Ingrid, Nicole
- Occupation: Actress
- Years active: 2011–2023
- Agent: Star Magic (2011–2023)
- Height: 5 ft 7 in (170 cm)
- Spouse: Kevin Bayawa
- Children: 1

Ingrid Nicole Moreno dela Paz, known locally as Ingrid dela Paz (born April 9, 1994), is a Filipino former actress. Her first on-screen appearance was an episode of Maalaala Mo Kaya. She appeared in the 2013 ABS-CBN romantic drama television series, Got to Believe.

== Early life and career ==
Dela Paz was born and raised in a Catholic family. She is the second of four children, and was raised for most of her childhood by a single mother. She studied Mass communication at Far Eastern University.

=== Modeling ===
As a professional model, dela Paz was first featured in Monday magazine's "Bureau Crazy" article in 2010. She signed with a modeling agency at the age of sixteen. She has done photo shoots with brands including Kickers, Yamaha, and Smart.

Her first runway modelling stint was the at the 2010 spring-summer Philippine Fashion Week. She has also modeled at the Adidas Fashion Show and the FG Wall Walk Fashion Show.

=== Television ===
Ingrid with Kathryn Bernardo rehearsing a scene in Got to Believe, Nov 26, 2013.

Dela Paz has appeared on a number of television shows and first came to public attention for appearing as Patricia in ABS-CBN's 2013 Philippine romantic comedy television series, Got to Believe. The series aired on ABS-CBN and worldwide on The Filipino Channel from August 26, 2013 to March 7, 2014.

== Post-showbiz life ==
In August 2024, Dela Paz completed the Culinary Management program from Centennial College in Toronto, Ontario, Canada, earning her an Ontario College Diploma with High Honours on her convocation in June 2025. In March 2025, she gave birth to daughter Kirsten Isla with non-showbiz husband Kevin Bayawa. She is now working as a chef for Joey Restaurant Group in Ontario since 2023.

== Filmography ==
=== Television ===
Year	Title	Role	Source
2012	Maala Mo Kaya: Kandila	Ghost	
2013	Maalaala Mo Kaya: Make Up	Gina	
2013	Gandang Gabi Vice	Herself guest with Julian Estrada, Alexander Diaz, Jane Oineza and Michelle Vito	
2013	Maalaala Mo Kaya: Hair Clip	Yenyen	
2013	Wansapanataym: Mommy Nappers	Diane	
2013	Maalaala Mo Kaya: Wedding Both	Belle	
2013—2021	ASAP	Herself / Performer / Segment Co-host	
2013—2014	Got to Believe	Patricia Reyes	
2014	Wansapanataym: My App Boyfie	Lexi	
2014	Maalaala Mo Kaya: Cellphone	Donna	
2014	Maalaala Mo Kaya: Kwintas	Lilia	
2015	Nathaniel	Leah	
2015	Pasión del Amor	Olivia "Lyvia" Samonte	
2016	The Story of Us	Antoinette	
2016	Tubig at Langis	Emma Villadolid	
2017–2018	Wildflower	Nimfa Naig	
2018–2019	Playhouse	Sandra	
2019	Maalaala Mo Kaya: Medalya	Irene	
2019	Maalaala Mo Kaya: Lipstick	Daisy	
2019	The Killer Bride	Guada (young)	
2019	Maalaala Mo Kaya: Red Roses	Mary Joyce	
2019–2020	The Haunted	Lorraine	
2020	Walang Hanggang Paalam	Amelia (young)	
2021	Maalaala Mo Kaya: Jacket	Rose	
2022	Tara, G!	Corrine	
2022	Maalaala Mo Kaya: Medalyon	Carol	
2023	Luv Is: Caught in His Arms	Alyanna Almero	

=== Film ===
Year	Title	Role	Source
2015	Haunted Mansion	Megan	

== Notes ==
- Star Magic introduces 'Star Magic Circle 2013'
