= Karen Reyes =

Filipino actress (born 1996)

- Born: Karen Mae Reyes; October 17, 1996 (age 30); Calapan, Oriental Mindoro, Philippines
- Other names: Ka, Makarena, Ren, Karen
- Years active: 2012–present
- Agent: Star Magic (2012–2020)
- Children: 2

Karen Mae Reyes (born October 17, 1996) is a Filipino actress. She was the Second Big Placer of Pinoy Big Brother: Teen Edition 4. She is a typical teenager in her hometown Calapan, Oriental Mindoro before joining the biggest reality show in the Philippines Pinoy Big Brother and finished as the second teen big placer next to Myrtle Sarrosa. Karen Reyes is currently managed and under contract to Star Magic, ABS-CBN's home based talent agency. Reyes is currently member of Star Magic Angels with Sarrosa, Aiko Climaco, Hanna Ledesma, Jed Montero and Shey Bustamante.

== Biography ==
Karen Mae Reyes was originally from Makati until she and her family moved to Calapan, Oriental Mindoro, Philippines. Reyes was born to an OFW father who is now deceased, and a carinderia cook/ entrepreneur mother, Ms. Claire Reyes.

== Filmography ==
=== Film ===
Year	Title	Role	Ref.
2013	Raketeros	Lyca	
2014	She's Dating the Gangster	Bridesmaid	
2015	Beauty and the Bestie	Nurse	
2017	My Ex and Whys	Nina	
2018	Mama's Girl	MQ	
2018	Petmalu	Gemma	
2019	Silly Red Shoes	Bernadette Magpantay	
2022	Yorme: The Isko Domagoso Story	Claudine Barretto	
2024	What You Did	—N/a	
2026	Always Yours, Never Mine	Nella	

=== Television ===
Year	Title	Role	Ref.
2012	Pinoy Big Brother: Teen Edition 4	Housemate/2nd Big Placer	
2012	Toda Max	Cameo Appearance	
2012	Angelito: Ang Bagong Yugto	Sofia	
2012–2016	Luv U	Ayen Timbol	
2013	Maalaala Mo Kaya: Saranggola	Young Mylene	
2013	Maalaala Mo Kaya: Heels	Zephi	
2014	Moon of Desire	Chimmy Alquiros	
2014	Maalaala Mo Kaya: Panyo	Margie	
2014	Forevermore	Charlotte	
2014	Ipaglaban Mo: Kasal Ka Sa Akin	Karen	
2015	Kapamilya, Deal or No Deal	Briefcase #15	
2015	It's Showtime	Guest	
2015	Ipaglaban Mo: Pagkakasala Ng Ama	Anna	
2015	Maalaala Mo Kaya: Pink Dress	Luisa	
2015	Maalaala Mo Kaya: Class Card	Emily	
2015	Walang Iwanan	Cameo Appearance	
2016	Be My Lady	Rose	
2016	Umagang Kay Ganda	Host	
2016	Family Feud	Player	
2016	It's Showtime	Herself/GirlTrends	
2016	Ipaglaban Mo: Kapansanan	Tina	
2016	Ipaglaban Mo: Brutal	Rowena	
2016	Maalaala Mo Kaya: Gitara	Lyca	
2016	Wansapanataym: Santi Cruz Is Coming To Town	Yam	
2017	Magandang Buhay	Guest	
2017	Minute To Win It	Player	
2017	Family Feud	Player (Team Liza)	
2017	The Promise of Forever	Shirley	
2018	Asintado	Emilita "Emmy" Gomez	
2018	Maalaala Mo Kaya: Kalabaw	Eleonita	
2018	Ngayon at Kailanman	Elisse	
2019	Maalaala Mo Kaya: Bukid	Elaine	
2019	Kaibigan Special Sunday	Various	
2020	Ipaglaban Mo: Huling Hapunan	Raine	
2021	Maalaala Mo Kaya: Tattoo	Teng	
2021	Maalaala Mo Kaya: Loving to Care	Dideng	

== Accolades ==
Year	Film Awards/Critics	Award	Result	Ref.
2012	Pinoy Big Brother: Teen Edition 4	2nd Big Placer	Won	
2012	ASAP Pop Viewer's Choice Awards 2012	ASAP Pop Female Tween Star	Nominated	
2012	ASAP Pop Viewer's Choice Awards 2012	ASAP Pop Tween Love Team	Won	
2012	26th PMPC Star Awards for Television	Best New Female TV Personality (Toda Max)	Nominated	
