= Jed Montero =

Filipino actress (born 1988)

- Born: Rebecca Gail Bacbac Montero; September 6, 1988 (age 37); Quezon City, Philippines
- Education: University of the Philippines Diliman
- Occupations: Actress, model, host and volleyball player
- Years active: 2010–present
- Agent: Star Magic (2010–2015)
- Height: 1.77 m (5 ft 10 in)

Jed Montero (born Rebecca Gail Bacbac Montero on September 6, 1988) is a Filipina actress, model, athlete and host.

Just like Paulo Avelino, Montero hails from Sagada, Mountain Province. Her parents are Rebecca Bacbac Montero and Jan Dikyam Montero.

Montero is a member of ABS-CBN's elite circle of homegrown talents namely Star Magic.

Montero was a member of the University of the Philippines women's volleyball team, seeing action in the UAAP (Seasons 70 and 71). She was a member of the RC Cola Raiders in the Philippine Super Liga (PSL) from 2013 to 2014.

== Filmography ==
=== Television ===
Year	Title	Role
2010	Wowowee	Co-Host
2010	Tanging Yaman	Alona
2013	Be Careful with my Heart	Teacher May Anne
2013	Dugong Buhay	Patricia 'Trisha' Gonzales
2013	Maalaala Mo Kaya: Saranggola	Hainah
2014	Pure Love	Cher
