= List of Agua Bendita episodes and chapters =

Agua Bendita (lit. 'Holy Water') is a 2010 Philippine romantic fantasy religious-drama television series based on the Liwayway Komiks comic book series of the same name created by Rod Santiago and directed by Malu L. Sevilla, Claudio "Tots" Sanchez-Mariscal IV, Don M. Cuaresma and Jojo A. Saguin. The series stars Andi Eigenmann in her dual role as twin sisters Agua and Bendita Cristi, together with leading men Matteo Guidicelli and Jason Abalos, with an ensemble cast consisting of Vina Morales, John Estrada, Pilar Pilapil, Alessandra De Rossi, Dimples Romana, Carlos Agassi, Pen Medina, Malou Crisologo, Jason Gainza, Malou de Guzman, Bing Loyzaga, Zaijian Jaranilla, and Zoren Legaspi in their supporting roles. The series premiered on ABS-CBN's Primetime Bida nighttime block from February 8 to September 3, 2010, replacing May Bukas Pa and was replaced by Noah and 1DOL on its timeslot.

== Series overview ==
| Season | No. of chapters | No. of episodes (each chapter numbers) | Originally released | |
| Season | No. of chapters | No. of episodes (each chapter numbers) | First released | Last released |
|---|---|---|---|---|
| Prologue and 1 (1–15) | 2 | 15 | February 8, 2010 | February 26, 2010 |
| 1 (16–40) and Rerun | 3 | 25 | March 1, 2010 | April 3, 2010 |
| 2 (41–72) | 3 | 32 | April 5, 2010 | May 21, 2010 |
| 2–3 (73–122) | 3 | 50 | May 24, 2010 | July 30, 2010 |
| 3–4 (123–132) | 2 | 10 | August 2, 2010 | August 13, 2010 |
| 4 and Epilogue (133–147) | 2 | 15 | August 16, 2010 | September 3, 2010 |

== Episodes ==
=== Prologue and Chapter 1–3 (Episodes 1–15) ===
| Chapter | Title | Episode titles | Original air date |
|---|---|---|---|
| Prologue | "Prologue" | "Episodes 1–2" | February 8–9, 2010 |
Marcial (John Estrada) and Mercedes (Vina Morales) are a young married couple living in Cebu, who pray for children of their own, but have none. After five years, Mercedes becomes pregnant, but is diagnosed with a heart defect, making her pregnancy high-risk. Marcial went to church praying for guidance. While in church, Criselda Barrameda (Dimples Romana) had an epileptic seizure and Marcial, a doctor, brought her to his clinic. Resting in the clinic, Criselda told Marcial of Father Guido, her uncle, who was a priest in her hometown. With his deep faith in God, he was able to perform miraculous healing. People would not listen when Guido claimed it was the work of God and instead began to worship him. Angered, Father Guido left, telling no one of his destination. It was speculated that he was staying in the mountains. It was Father Guido whom Criselda sought for healing. A few months later, while at the church, Mercedes felt extremely thirsty and stole the jar of agua bendita (holy water). Afterwards, she craved agua bendita. Marcial learned Mercedes was carrying twins, one of whom inherited Mercedes' heart condition. Marcial prayed to God for help with his wife's desire for stolen agua bendita. One day, a group of men rush a weakened old man into Marcial's clinic, Father Guido. Nearing the end of his life, Guido instructed Marcial to give the bottle of agua bendita to Criselda. That night, Mercedes bled, almost having a miscarriage; Marcial gave her Father Guido's agua bendita in order to save her and their babies. Marcial later dreamt of the late Father Guido, who told him that if he would not ask for Criselda's forgiveness, there will be consequence to his stealing. Marcial kept his dream from Criselda, but one of daughters was sealed: Agua, the younger sister, was born in water form. Marcial and Mercedes finally get their wishes when Mercedes becomes pregnant with twins. Meanwhile, a suffering epileptic hopes for a cure from a miraculous healing priest. Marcial decides to keep Agua from the people in order to protect her. Bendita also grows in a confined environment due to a heart condition.
| 1 | "Chapter One" | "Episodes 3–15" | February 10–26, 2010 |
Fearing for Agua's safety, Marcial hid her with his assistant Tonyang, telling Mercedes that Agua is stillborn. Agua was kept in a huge aquarium inside a hidden room in the Cristis' house. Bendita, Agua's twin, was spoiled by her grandmother, Doña Amalia, the mother of Mercedes, while Agua became humble and content in Marcial's supervision. When the family learned of Agua's existence, Mercedes loved her, but Bendita and Doña Amalia hated Agua, usually punishing her by giving her hard chores. At one point, they abandoned Aqua in a park, where she met Tod, Criselda's crippled son. Longing for her family, Agua decides to visit them in person. Meanwhile, Amalia suspects that Marcial is womanizing due to his suspicious actions. The Cristis finally learn of Agua's existence. As Agua adjusts to her new life, Bendita does everything in order to take her twin sister out of the scene. Amalia carries out her deep hatred for the strange Agua by losing the child at the park. There, Agua finds herself in danger. Baldo puts Bendita's life in danger, thinking that she is the miraculous Agua. Marcial lies about Agua's death to save Bendita. Amalia holds a grand introduction party for Bendita after the Cristis decided to move to her house in Manila. Amalia's harsh treatment toward Agua pushes Marcial to make a difficult decision. Amalia befriends Agua after convincing Mercedes and her family not to leave her. Paco agrees to help Criselda find Agua. Bendita runs away from home, putting her and Agua's lives in danger. Marcial goes to Baldo and Criselda to find information about Agua and Bendita's whereabouts. Unknown to him, the twin sisters find themselves in grave danger. Agua and Bendita face another problem after escaping from their pursuers. After finding her way home, Bendita develops resentment toward Agua again. Agua, on the other hand, proves her love for Bendita when the latter suffers an accident. Bendita continues to express her hatred toward Agua. The conflict between Agua and Bendita takes a toll on Mercedes’ health.

=== Chapter 1 (Episodes 16–40) and Rerun ===
| Chapter | Title | Episode titles | Original air date |
|---|---|---|---|
| 1 | "Chapter One" | "Episodes 16–40" | March 1–31, 2010 |
She healed him with her tears, and he reunited her with her family. Criselda and Baldo, her husband, discovered Marcial's theft of agua bendita, and they took revenge on his family by kidnapping Bendita, mistaking her for Agua. The family travels to Manila to save the child they believe is Agua. Marcial discovers Agua's healing abilities, and used it to cure patients. The cures attracted media attention and the family had to flee on Doña Lisa's yacht. While at sea, Doña Amalia accidentally threw Agua overboard, letting the family think she drowned. Criselda and Tot stayed at the Aguirre household as maids to spy on the Cristis. Agua was found by Ben and Rosy, who raised Agua as their own daughter. They try to return Agua to her family, but learn that they moved to the United States, where Mercedes meets his colleague Luisito, who in turn offers him a job. Bendita once again feels loneliness within her family, and the couple decides to have their marriage annulled. Ten years later, Bendita is a sassy spoiled teen, while Agua is a rural girl who only wants to be reunited with her family. Marcial is continuing his medical mission until Divina fell in love with him, which is why Mercedes started arranging their divorce. While staying in the Philippines, Agua befriended Dolly, a dolphin, and Otep, Dolly's pet clownfish.
| Rerun | "Agua Bendita: The Holy Week Special" | "Episodes 1–40" | April 1–3, 2010 |
A rerun of the show's first 40 episodes during Holy Triduum of 2010.

=== Chapter 2 (Episodes 41–72) ===
| Chapter | Title | Episode titles | Original air date |
|---|---|---|---|
| 2 | "Chapter Two" | "Episodes 41–72" | April 5–May 7; May 11–21, 2010 |
Ronnie falls from his sailboat, causing his blindness, and is saved by Agua. The two became close friends, until Marcial discovers Agua. The family reunites, despite Marcial and Mercedes' divorce. After years in America away from Agua, Bendita is unused to Agua. Bendita falls in love with Ronnie, who still loves Agua. Doña Amalia, on the other hand, struggles with debts, and steals the money intended for the hotel Ronnie's mother Solita is planning.

=== Chapters 2–3 (Episodes 73–122) ===
| Chapter | Title | Episode titles | Original air date |
|---|---|---|---|
| 2 3 | "Chapters Two and Three" | "Episodes 73–122" | May 24–July 30, 2010 |
Ronnie is reunited with Solita, and his blindness is treated. When he first saw Agua, he was shocked by her looks, causing Agua to run away to a deserted island by herself. On that island, Agua meets Paco (Tod), who befriends her. After a while, Paco brings Agua to Criselda and Baldo, who are now working for Señor Lucas, a fake healer. The group uses Agua's healing powers to benefit themselves. Agua escapes the fraudulent healers with Paco's help. Bendita causes Solita's head trauma. The twins exchange appearances on different places; Agua turning normal at the seaport, while Bendita turns blue in the forest. Bendita tries to return to their household, but is kidnapped by Baldo, who thinks she's Agua. Agua returns home, but no one believes she is Agua as she still appears to be Bendita; she experiences Bendita's life, friendships and school, but eventually others come to believe she is who she claims to be. Mercedes' relationship with Luisito ends. Solita discovers Doña Amalia's betrayal, and fires her. Doña Amalia discovers the true Bendita, and makes a truce with Criselda and Baldo in exchange for Bendita's life. The police pursue the couple, leading to Baldo's escape and Criselda's imprisonment.

=== Chapters 3–4 (Episodes 123–132) ===
| Chapter | Title | Episode titles | Original air date |
|---|---|---|---|
| 3 | "Chapter Three" | "Episode 123" | August 2, 2010 |
Doña Amalia continues to hide Bendita in exchange for a truce with Luisito. To learn Bendita's location, Mercedes agrees to marry Luisito. Marcial tries to stop them, but Luisito had a change of heart and freed Mercedes.
| 4 | "Chapter Four" | "Episodes 124–132" | August 3–August 13, 2010 |
Solita files charges against Bendita, not knowing it is Agua. Ronnie frightens Bendita by faking a marriage contract with Agua, when Bendita arrives. Envious of Agua, Bendita steals some agua bendita from Criselda, and uses it to become a fake healer, but Baldo traps Bendita in a freezer. That night, Agua as Bendita celebrates her debut. Doña Amalia's ice sculpture for Bendita's debut arrives; unknown to everyone, the sculpture is Bendita herself in Agua's form, now frozen. Paco and Agua discover what happened to Bendita, while Doña Amalia almost breaks Bendita's ice sculpture. Marcial, Ben, Ronnie, and Paco carry Bendita to the pool to thaw her, but Agua finds a little amount of agua bendita, and drinks it which allows her to switch forms with her twin and regain her healing powers.

=== Chapter 4 and Epilogue (Episodes 133–147) ===
| Chapter | Title | Episode titles | Original air date |
|---|---|---|---|
Episodes 133–147 - Agua Bendita: Ang Huling Tatlong Linggo (The Last 3 Weeks)
| 4 Epilogue | "Chapter Four and Epilogue" | "Episodes 133–147" | August 16–September 3, 2010 |
Bendita thaws, but retains her fluid form; she is brownish while Agua is blue. Bendita blames Agua for what happened, worsening her misdeeds. She began to experience vomiting, abdominal pain, nausea, and finally lung cancer and a brain tumor. As Bendita continue to struggle with her sickness, the Cristi family searches for help. They found some of Criselda and Baldo's agua bendita but while this does not heal Bendita, Agua's is successful. During the preparations for Marcial and Mercedes' wedding, Mercedes is shot by Baldo and is hospitalized. That night, Agua dreams of Padre Gido, who warns her that if she heals her mother, those will be her last healing tears. Bendita calls Baldo to offer the spring water in exchange for her sister. Once freed, Agua goes to the hospital and heals her mother. Doña Amalia helps Criselda escape by leaving a hair pin to unlock the handcuffs fixing her to the hospital bed. Marcial spots Baldo waiting outside the hospital for Criselda; during their struggle for the gun, it goes off, killing Baldo. Paco goes to see his father's body in the hospital morgue and starts to feel anger. Criselda abducts Bendita, but Bendita texts Marcial the license plate number and the police chase Criselda's car. Paco finds Bendita and they embrace. Amalia falls into water; as she cannot swim, Agua saves Doña Amalia's life. Criselda shoots the LPG tank, causing the boat to explode. Criselda gets life imprisonment for her crimes, and she and Paco say a tearful goodbye to each other. Mercedes and Bendita visited Dona Amalia, who is now in a mental institution after the explosion. Agua disappeared, thinking to hide from her family, but realizes that her family needs her and eventually returns, revealing herself in public without the fear of being judged by her appearance. After suffering and trauma, the Cristi family finds a peaceful life; Solita accepts Agua as her son's love, and Agua continues to heal those in need. After all the suffering and extreme experiences, the Cristi family managed to live a normal and peaceful life.
