= List of 1DOL episodes =

1DOL (stylized as iDOL) was a 2010 Philippine drama starring Sarah Geronimo, Sam Milby and Coco Martin. It aired on ABS-CBN's Primetime Bida evening block from September 6, 2010, to October 22, 2010, replacing Agua Bendita in the revised second primetime slot. The show was directed by Jojo A. Saguin and Ruel S. Bayani.

The show was cancelled on October 22, 2010, garnering only 35 episodes in total before being replaced by Mara Clara.

== Episodes ==
=== 2010 ===
No.	Title	Original release date
1	"Sumabog na Pangarap (Bursting Dreams)"	September 6, 2010
2	"Bagong Mundo Bagong Pag-ibig (New World, New Love)"	September 7, 2010
3	"Kaibigan (Friend)"	September 8, 2010
4	"Walang Iwanan (Leave No One Behind)"	September 9, 2010
5	"Maliit ang Mundo (Small World)"	September 10, 2010
6	"Magkababata... Magkikita? (Will Youth See Each Other?)"	September 13, 2010
7	"Pangakong Pagsisihan (Regretting Promise)"	September 14, 2010
8	"Ang Pagtutuos (The Calculation)"	September 15, 2010
9	"Pagtatapat (Confession)"	September 16, 2010
10	"Simula ng Pasiklaban (Start of a Battle)"	September 17, 2010
11	"Ang Paniningil (The Charge)"	September 20, 2010
12	"Ang Sorpresa (The Surprise)"	September 21, 2010
13	"Hello Billie Goodbye Jean"	September 22, 2010
14	"Walang Patawad (No Forgiveness)"	September 23, 2010
15	"Bawal Mahalin (Forbidden to Love)"	September 24, 2010
16	"Takas (Escape)"	September 27, 2010
17	"Ang Sinagot ang Sinaktan (The One Who Answered is the One Who Was Hurt)"	September 28, 2010
18	"Labag sa Batas Labag sa Puso (Against the Law is Against the Heart)"	September 29, 2010
19	"Masamang Kaaway (Evil Foe)"	September 30, 2010
20	"Hiwalay ng Landas (Separated from the Path)"	October 1, 2010
21	"Tuloy ang Awit (The Song Continues)"	October 4, 2010
22	"Pagibig na Ipaglalaban (Love to Fight For)"	October 5, 2010
23	"Laro ng Tadhana (Game of Destiny)"	October 6, 2010
24	"Nakaw na Tagumpay (Stolen Victory)"	October 7, 2010
25	"Bagong Buhay (New Life)"	October 8, 2010
26	"Hindi Isusuko ang Pangarap (Dreams Cannot be Given Up)"	October 11, 2010
27	"Sagad sa Poot (Full of Hate)"	October 12, 2010
28	"Ang Pasabog ni Diana (Diana's Surprise)"	October 13, 2010
29	"Pagsuko sa Pag-Ibig, Pagsulong sa Pangarap (Surrendering in Love, Advancing in Dreams)"	October 14, 2010
30	"Ang Nalalapit na Pagbubunyag (The Near Revelation)"	October 15, 2010
31	"Ang Nababantang Panganib (An Imminent Danger)"	October 18, 2010
32	"Ang Rebelasyon (The Revelation)"	October 19, 2010
33	"Family Reunion"	October 20, 2010
34	"Huling Laban ni Vince at ni Lando (The Final Argument of Vince and Lando)"	October 21, 2010
35	"Finale"	October 22, 2010
