= Toothbrush (disambiguation) =

A toothbrush is an oral hygiene instrument.

Toothbrush may also refer to:

- Toothbrush moustache, a moustache style
- Toothbrush (album) by Dr. Dog, 2002
- "Toothbrush" (song), a 2016 song by DNCE
- "Toothbrush" (The Apprentice), a 2022 television episode
- "Toothbrush" (Maalaala Mo Kaya), a 2016 episode about Leni Robredo
- "Toothbrush," a song by Brad Paisley from his 2011 album This Is Country Music
