= List of Mara Clara (2010 TV series) episodes =

Mara Clara is a Philippine drama television series which aired on ABS-CBN's Primetime Bida block from October 25, 2010, to June 3, 2011, replacing 1DOL. Directed by Jerome Chavez Pobocan, the series stars Kathryn Bernardo and Julia Montes together with an ensemble cast. It is a remake of the 1992 series of the same name that starred Judy Ann Santos and Gladys Reyes. The title is derived from María Clara, the mestiza heroine in Noli Me Tángere, a novel written by José Rizal. It was the highest-rated program on Philippine television from June 3, 2011, to October 26, 2012, when the 2012 series Walang Hanggan became the highest-rated show for 2012 according to Kantar Media Philippines. The series is streaming online on YouTube.

== Series overview ==
Year	Episode numbers	Episodes	First aired	Last aired
2010	1–50	50	October 25, 2010	December 31, 2010
2011	51–158	108	January 3, 2011	June 3, 2011

== Episodes ==
=== 2010 ===
No.	Title	Original release date
1	"Alvira and Susan Give Birth at the Same Time to Two Baby Girls"	October 25, 2010
Mara and Clara get switched at birth by Clara's uncle. Gary conspires with his brother Karlo to kidnap the daughter of her ex-girlfriend, Alvira, for money and revenge. However, his wife Susan’s naivety leads to his capture by the authorities. Karlo aborts the kidnapping but commits a more terrible act.
2	"Carlo Keeps His Deepest Secret Inside His Diary"	October 26, 2010
Clara grows up in luxury but she feels that her parents neglect her. Mara basks in Susan and Karlo’s love despite living in poverty. Through Alvira’s donation, Mara manages to study in Clara’s school. However, Clara makes Mara’s school life even harder.
3	"Mara and Clara Lead Contrasting Lives"	October 27, 2010
Clara is forced to spend more time with Mara when they are chosen to represent their school in the academic decathlon. As an unexpected friendship blossoms between the two, they also find out that their mothers used to be close friends too.
4	"Mara Tries to Be Friends with Clara"	October 28, 2010
Susan agrees to sell phones for extra income, unaware that her items are stolen. Mara signs up with the school paper, while Clara enlists in the Drama Club. To Mara’s dismay, she realizes that her club will be in close partnership with Christian’s.
5	"The Tension Between Mara and Clara Starts to Intensify"	October 29, 2010
Planning a slumber party in her house, Clara seeks Susan’s permission for Mara to attend. As Mara’s closeness with Clara threatens, Clara’s friends decide to pull a prank on the former.
6	"Mara and Clara Team Up to Win a School Competition"	November 1, 2010
Gary is finally released from jail. Clara gets into trouble after trying to help Mara, causing Amante to prohibit her from befriending Gary’s daughter anymore.
7	"Alvira and Susan Bond to Make Up for Lost Time"	November 2, 2010
Clara learns about Alvira's connection to Gary in the past. Soon, Gary crosses paths with Amante when he fetches Mara from school as a pretext to meet Clara.
8	"Mara and Christian Join the Same School Organization"	November 3, 2010
Mara and Clara's respective group of friends get them ousted. Clara finds herself in hot water when Amante learns that she joined Gary and Mara for dinner.
9	"Clara Defends Mara from Her Friends"	November 4, 2010
Clara asks Christian to help her get revenge after she was not invited to Kaye’s party. Clara gives Mara a makeover, which obviously fascinates Christian. A group of men ambushed Gary and Lupe on their way home.
10	"Susan Finally Learns to Go Against Lola Lupe"	November 5, 2010
Simeon suffers the consequences of his treachery. Clara catches a woman kissing Amante at a restaurant. Desiree makes Clara fall down from a pyramid during cheerleading practice at school.
11	"Clara Invites Mara to Her Slumber Party"	November 8, 2010
Desiree appears in school all muddy and stinky after masked men had her swim in mud. Lupe suddenly shows a change of heart toward Susan. Clara gets into trouble with Amante after she went to Mara’s house without his permission.
12	"Clara's Friends Humiliate Mara"	November 9, 2010
Amante asks Cristina for their relationship to remain professional after Alvira and Clara catch her giving him a neck rub in the office. Finding a bundle of cash among Gary’s things, Susan asks Karlo to find out where Gary works.
13	"Gary Comes Out of Jail"	November 10, 2010
Despite feeling nervous as she applies at Christian’s coffee shop, Mara successfully passes the interview that Christian's mom, Vanessa, gave her. Back at Mara’s house, Lupe discovers Karlo’s diary while scrounging around for a spare change.
14	"Clara Learns of the Past Between Alvira and Gary"	November 11, 2010
Alvira encourages Susan to sell packed lunches in the office after tasting her cooking. Clara recruits some boys from the basketball team to deface Mara’s posters.
15	"Gary Finally Meets Clara"	November 12, 2010
Losing despite trying to tamper with the election results, Clara vows revenge against Mara. Karlo becomes so upset it makes Gary wonder about the importance of the medallion.
16	"Susan Discovers Gary's Job and Asks Him to Stop for Their Family's Sake"	November 15, 2010
Tension rises between Clara and Mara as their rivalry for the student council election and Christian's attention intensifies. Alvira and Amante learn that Karlo found their medallion and gave it to Mara as a gift.
17	"Despite Being Freed from Jail, Gary Returns to Being a Criminal"	November 16, 2010
Mara returns the medallion to Alvira. The Del Valles' vacation comes to naught as Gary shows up, and Clara's antics almost cost Amante a business deal. Back in Manila, Clara invites her friends, including Mara and her family except Karlo to the launching of Del Valle Realty’s latest project.
18	"Karlo Deals with His Guilt as He Keeps Mara's True Identity from His Family"	November 17, 2010
Amante's good mood turns sour following the Davids' arrival and Clara's rudeness toward Cristina at the launch party. Clara soon stirs up more trouble after seeing Mara with Christian, putting her nemesis in an unfortunate situation.
19	"Clara Reinstates Herself as the Queen Bee of Their School and Threatens Desiree Never to Threaten Her Leadership Again"	November 18, 2010
Another tragedy befalls the Davids as Lupe suffers from a heart attack following her attempt to stop Karlo and Gary from fighting physically. While Clara spreads a rumor against her nemesis, Alvira offers help to Mara and Susan.
20	"Mara Tries to Convince Clara That Being Queen Bee Doesn't Necessarily Mean That She Has to Be Mean to Everyone"	November 19, 2010
Karlo tries to fetch Mara and Susan from the Del Valle home. Clara’s jealousy further intensifies as Christian gives Mara a welcome hug in school.
21	"Desiree's Plan to Bring Down Clara Succeeds But Takes a Toll as Gary Kidnap and Torture Her for Revenge"	November 22, 2010
Clara continues her cruelty to Mara following Christian's rejection of her feelings. Amante takes the girls to an annual father-daughter camping event.
22	"A Very Disappointed Clara Confronts Amante and Compares the Attention She Gets from Gary and His Own Father"	November 23, 2010
Without a map and compass, Mara gets lost in the woods. Clara eavesdrops on Christian and Mara’s phone conversation, where she hears a confession that enrages her.
23	"Gary and Amante React Differently When Clara Joins the Davids for Dinner"	November 24, 2010
A fight between Mara and Clara sparks tensions at the dinner table. Meanwhile, Gary and Karlo decide to go into hiding as Loverboy puts out a hit on them.
24	"Amante Wobbles When Clara Confronts Him about His Infidelity"	November 25, 2010
Karlo figures in an accident while Loverboy's men chase him. A spiteful Gary turns to the police for help in order to bring down his former boss.
25	"Susan Asks Carlo to Follow Gary to Make Sure That He is Not Back to His Criminal Ways"	November 26, 2010
Gary takes Lupe and Susan with him into hiding. Clara comes up with a plan to frame Mara at school.
26	"Mara Starts to Work as a Food Vendor in Christian's Cafe"	November 29, 2010
Amante and Alvira's intervention thwarts Clara's plan completely. Gary and Nenita confront Loverboy.
27	"Tension is in the Air as Mara and Clara Both Vie for School Batch President"	November 30, 2010
Mara defends herself when Clara's jealousy reaches its boiling point. Alvira concludes that Clara is the victim, leaving Mara and Susan with no choice but to leave the mansion.
28	"Alliances and Schemes Play Out in the Midst of School Elections"	December 1, 2010
Clara's plan to embarrass Susan during career day backfires when Susan impresses everyone instead. Tired of Gary's claims that he is her real father, Clara sets out to find the truth.
29	"Gary Orders Mara to Withdraw from School Elections"	December 2, 2010
Amante and Alvira grow concerned upon learning that Clara skipped school and made a bank transaction without their knowledge. Unknown to them, Clara takes a DNA test to prove Gary's claims wrong.
30	"Clara Makes Sure That She Wins the Elections"	December 3, 2010
To get away from Gary's hounding, Clara tells Alvira that she wants to study abroad. Her parents, however, do not readily agree. Lupe finally finds out the truth about her granddaughter after reading Karlo's diary.
31	"Karlo Surprisingly Scolds Mara for Losing the Medallion Which Made Gary Very Suspicious"	December 6, 2010
When Lupe tries to reach out to Clara, the young lady suffers an accident that sets off a chain of events leading to shocking discoveries and desperate acts.
32	"Alvira is Still Confused Why Mara Has the Same Medallion Like Hers"	December 7, 2010
The truth about Mara and Clara's true identities come to light—throwing their respective families into turmoil and raising questions about the two girls' future.
33	"Jealousy Strikes Clara When She Sees Mara and Christian Together"	December 8, 2010
The Davids and the Del Valles are all in for massive adjustments when a judge awards custody of Mara and Clara to their respective biological parents.
34	"Mara and Christian Spend More Time Together"	December 9, 2010
After Gary failed to come up with an equally expensive bash, Clara crashes Mara’s sweet sixteen birthday party and makes a scene. Meanwhile, the del Valles suffer another scandal.
35	"Clara Makes Sure that Christina Won't Be Able to Contact His Father"	December 10, 2010
Alvira asks Amante for an annulment. Unknown to them, Gary makes a deal with Cristina to ultimately wreck their marriage. Meanwhile, Clara becomes exasperated when Christian asks Mara to be his girlfriend in front of the whole school.
36	"Erris Convinces Christian to Court Mara"	December 13, 2010
Still adjusting to her new life, Mara turns down Christian. Brokenhearted, Christian tries to renew his friendship with Clara. Much to Amante’s chagrin, Cristina succeeds in keeping the company’s board of directors from kicking her out.
37	"Clara Confides Her Problems with Mara to Gary"	December 14, 2010
Infuriated after seeing Christian’s note to Mara, Clara tells Alvira that the two have a relationship. Alvira gives Mara a chance to explain, while Gary teaches Christian a lesson. As further revenge, Clara enacts another spiteful plan.
38	"After Visiting in the Hospital, Alvira Asks Clara to Apologize to Mara"	December 15, 2010
After learning that Clara is responsible for Mara’s troubles, Susan ends up hitting Clara. At school, Mara becomes the class’ first honor with Clara coming in second.
39	"Clara Tells Christian to Visit Mara in the Hospital"	December 16, 2010
The near-death experience of Clara makes her behave better toward everyone, including Mara and Susan. However, Lupe does not believe this act one bit.
40	"Alvira Asks Susan and Mara to Stay in Their House for the Meantime"	December 17, 2010
Amante and Alvira engage in a heated argument after the prior receives the pictures of Alvira meeting with Gary. Meanwhile, Gary proceeds to his vicious plan.
41	"Clara Makes Sure That Mara Will Be Tormented as Long She Stays in Their House"	December 20, 2010
Mara and Clara's family scramble to heed the kidnappers' demands and rescue the two girls. Gary, however, makes a vile move that endangers the lives of his captives.
42	"Clara Manipulates the Basketball Team to Be Against Mara"	December 21, 2010
Mara's family mourns her death, including Clara. On the day of Mara's funeral, Amante vows justice, while Alvira and Susan share a bond in their grief for the daughter they shared.
43	"Amante Joins Clara and Stands as Mara's Dad in Their Father and Daughter Camp"	December 22, 2010
Now under the care of Utoy's friends, Mara regains consciousness albeit having recollection of how she was saved. Clara forces Gary to admit the kidnapping orchestration.
44	"Gary Shows Up in the School's Father and Daughter Camp"	December 23, 2010
Cristina escapes the police and hides in a safe house with Gary's help. Lupe pleads with Alvira to stop seeing Clara so as not to interfere with the young girl's relationship with Susan.
45	"Amante and Gary Spearhead the Search for Mara"	December 24, 2010
Lupe rushes to the mansion after failing to convince Gary to mend his ways. Gary tricks Cristina into giving him access to her home but encounters a problem with the police. Meanwhile, Barang and Nanding eventually discover Mara's true identity.
46	"Clara's Jealousy Peaks as Her Parent's Affection for Mara Gets Stronger"	December 27, 2010
After repeatedly doing menial chores, Clara runs away back to the Del Valles. With Christian's aid, Mara helps her grandmother recover even if it means revealing her secret. Meanwhile, Alvira and Amante begin to doubt whether Mara is truly dead.
47	"Clara Loses the Trust of People Around Her"	December 28, 2010
Gary follows Christian to see where Mara might be hiding. Meanwhile, with the DNA results revealing the truth, the Del Valles begin to move to get back Mara, as well as find her kidnapper's mastermind.
48	"Gary Needs to Get to Carlo Right Away to Save Him from Death"	December 29, 2010
After realizing that Gary has been setting her up, Cristina asks Amante to meet her. Meanwhile, Christian asks for Susan's help as Mara nearly gets abducted again. Susan then decides that she and Mara go into hiding.
49	"Gary Protects Carlo's Secret No Matter What"	December 30, 2010
Susan gets a job at a resort that town mayor owned, who turns out to be the father of Mara's rescuer, Derrick. After Gary successfully executes his plan, Alvira hires him as his driver.
50	"After Carlo's Death, Will Gary Have the Heart to Tell Mara the Truth?"	December 31, 2010
Seeing Vonel as a threat to his plans, Gary pretends to be a robber and tries to scare the housekeeper. Meanwhile, Amante surprises Alvira at their new home only to find Gary there. The two men then come to blows.

=== 2011 ===
No.	Title	Original release date
51	"Gary Insists on Leaving to Keep His Family Safe"	January 3, 2011
For the sake of her plan, Alvira admits her feelings for Gary and asks him and Amante to keep it a secret. Susan feels ill and suspects she might be pregnant with Gary’s child.
52	"Clara Refuses to Believe that Gary is her Real Father"	January 4, 2011
Susan confirms her pregnancy, unaware that Gary announces his intention to marry Alvira. Amante finds an opportunity to send Gary to prison when he is taken to a drug exchange.
53	"Clara Seizes the Opportunity to Humiliate Mara Now That She is Back in Their House"	January 5, 2011
Discovering that Alvira still loves Amante, Gary confronts her about her betrayal after getting the ransom money. Soon, Mara and Susan arrive at Alvira’s house.
54	"Alvira Presents Mara as an Image Model"	January 6, 2011
As Amante's condition becomes stable, Gary seeks Clara's help in bailing him out of prison. Gary goes into a rage when he finds his mother missing, unaware that Mara and Susan visit Lupe.
55	"Clara Makes Sure That Mara Won't Be a Part of the Print Ad"	January 7, 2011
The Del Valles face Gary in court, where Clara clashes with Mara in another hair-pulling match. Gary follows Amante and Alvira home and discovers where they live.
56	"Clara's Jealousy Hypers Up as She Targets Alvira's Gift for Mara's Mom"	January 10, 2011
Clara testifies against Alvira, while Lupe makes a testimony against Gary. Gary makes a pretense as Lupe tries to convince him to stop harassing the Del Valles any further.
57	"Who Will Amante and Alvira Believe After Catching Mara and Clara in a Fight?"	January 11, 2011
Mara's life returns to normal when Gary is sent to jail. Clara becomes furious when she learns of the Del Valles' plan to relocate to Dubai without her.
58	"Clara's Scheme Goes the Other Way When Christian Saves Mara from Alleged Cheating"	January 12, 2011
Gary threatens Alvira to come with him in exchange of sparing Amante and Mara. However, Mara gets wind of his plot and manages to track down their whereabouts.
59	"Clara Continues to Pin the Exam Cheating to Mara"	January 13, 2011
Mara tries to save Alvira, but ends up being taken captive. As the police arrive, Clara forces Gary to pretend to hostage her, enabling him to escape.
60	"Much to Clara's Dismay, Amante and Alvira Come to School for Mara's Aid"	January 14, 2011
After Clara is released from jail, Gary asks his daughter to join him once again in his revenge. Clara, however, starts cooperating with the Del Valles.
61	"Mara Had Enough of Clara's Bullying and Starts to Fight Back"	January 17, 2011
62	"Clara Forces Mara to Do Different Household Chores One After the Other"	January 18, 2011
63	"Vanessa Asks Clara to Keep Her Son, Christian Away from Mara"	January 19, 2011
64	"Trying to Gain Her Daughter's Affection, Gary Reaches Out to Clara"	January 20, 2011
65	"Clara's Disappointment with Her Parents Leads Her into Initiating a DNA Test with Gary"	January 21, 2011
66	"Clara Nervously Awaits for the Results of the DNA Test"	January 24, 2011
67	"Amante is Bothered by the P20,000 Cash Advance Made by Clara"	January 25, 2011
68	"Faith Keeps Mara and Clara at Each Other Paths as They Vie for Top Honors"	January 26, 2011
69	"Gary Makes Sure That She Will Be a Part of Clara's Life"	January 27, 2011
70	"Lupe's Excitement to Hug Her Real Granddaughter Leads to Another Mara and Clara Squabble"	January 28, 2011
71	"Clara is Rushed to the Hospital"	January 31, 2011
72	"Mara Suffers in Jail for a Crime She Never Intended"	February 1, 2011
73	"The Ultimate Secret Involving Mara and Clara Twist Their Faith"	February 2, 2011
74	"Gary and the del Valle's Need to Resort to Legal Actions to Get Custody of Mara and Clara"	February 3, 2011
75	"Mara and Clara are Forced to Live with Their Real Parents"	February 4, 2011
76	"Clara Is Having a Hard Time Embracing Being a David"	February 7, 2011
77	"Clara Barges in Mara's Party After Being Disappointed from Her Own"	February 8, 2011
78	"Gary's Patience Goes Beyond It's [sic] Limit with Clara"	February 9, 2011
79	"Clara Plays with Mara's Feelings by Assuring Her That the del Valle's Love for Her Is Inevitable"	February 10, 2011
80	"Alvira Asks Amante for an Annulment"	February 11, 2011
81	"How Long Can Susan Stand Clara's Stubbornness?"	February 14, 2011
82	"Clara Shies Away from Her Friends After Realizing Her Present State"	February 15, 2011
83	"Clara Wants Christian to Pity Her to Win His Heart"	February 16, 2011
84	"Gary Puts a Threat to Mara's Life to Avenge Her Daughter"	February 17, 2011
85	"Clara Lock Christian and Mara Inside the Storage Room"	February 18, 2011
86	"Clara Schemes Away to Push Her Mothers Against Each Other"	February 21, 2011
87	"Amante Tells Gary That He Will Transfer Mara to Another School Next Year So as to Avoid More Inter-Family Conflict"	February 22, 2011
88	"Everybody Is Quite Surprised with Clara's Sudden Change of Heart"	February 23, 2011
89	"To Avoid Further Conflict, the del Valles Decides to Go to America"	February 24, 2011
90	"Gary Comes Up with a Plan to Stop the del Valles from Going Abroad"	February 25, 2011
91	"Gary Goes Crazy After Seeing His Men Kidnapped His Daughter by Mistake"	February 28, 2011
92	"Will Mara Leave Clara Behind to Escape on Her Own?"	March 1, 2011
93	"Mara Runs Away from Her Kidnappers"	March 2, 2011
94	"Amante Goes to the Media to Ask the Public for Help to Save Mara and Clara"	March 3, 2011
95	"Alvira Reacts Hysterically on the Sudden Turn of Events in Their Lives"	March 4, 2011
96	"Tears Drop at Mara's Burial"	March 7, 2011
97	"Clara's Guilt Goes Haywire with Mara's Death"	March 8, 2011
98	"Amante Works with the Police to Identify Mara and Clara's Kidnappers"	March 9, 2011
99	"Mara Tries to Remember What Really Happened to Her"	March 10, 2011
100	"Clara Still Suspects Her Father as the Mastermind Behind the Kidnapping"	March 11, 2011
101	"Lupe Suspects That Clara Knows Something about the Recent Mishaps"	March 14, 2011
102	"Quite Surprised at Seeing Him in the Province, Mara Runs After Christian in a Public Market"	March 15, 2011
103	"Mara Is Very Excited to Meet Her Savior, Utoy"	March 16, 2011
104	"Christian and Mara Continue to Hide Away from Danger in the Province"	March 17, 2011
105	"Gary Reacts to His Mother's Suspicions"	March 18, 2011
106	"Lupe's Conscience Is Forcing Her to Tell Gary's Secret"	March 21, 2011
107	"Mara Wants to Go Back to the City to Check on Lola Lupe"	March 22, 2011
108	"Amante Tries to Find Evidence to Pin the Kidnap and Murder Case to Gary"	March 23, 2011
109	"Clara Still Insists on Living with the del Valles"	March 24, 2011
110	"Amante and Alvira Doubt Mara's Death"	March 25, 2011
111	"People Start to Believe That Mara Can Still Be Alive"	March 28, 2011
112	"Amante Asks the Public for Help in Finding Mara"	March 29, 2011
113	"Mara's Heart Breaks as Her Family Suffers"	March 30, 2011
114	"Clara Asks Herself How Long She Can Keep Gary's Secret"	March 31, 2011
115	"Gary Suspects That Susan Is Keeping a Big Secret from Him"	April 1, 2011
116	"Gary Makes Sure That He Is Always Near Alvira's Side"	April 4, 2011
117	"What Will Derick's Role Be in Mara's Life?"	April 5, 2011
118	"Susan and Mara Face New Challenges as Restaurant Employees"	April 6, 2011
119	"Still Stuck in Jail, Amante Fears the Worst for His Family"	April 7, 2011
120	"The del Valle's Plans Against Gary Are Unveiled"	April 8, 2011
121	"Clara Is Stuck with Her Father's Evil Tricks"	April 11, 2011
122	"Will Christian Lead Clara to Susan and Mara's Hiding Place?"	April 12, 2011
123	"Susan and Mara Can't Hide in Isla Verde Forever"	April 13, 2011
124	"Alvira Continue to Shadow and Manipulate Gary's Actions to Find Evidence Against Him"	April 14, 2011
125	"Will Clara Keep Mum on Susan and Mara's Hiding Place?"	April 15, 2011
126	"Clara Goes Back to Her Old Mean Ways"	April 18, 2011
127	"Amante Wonders Why Alvira Chose to Be Closer with Gary"	April 19, 2011
128	"Derrick Admits His True Feelings for Mara"	April 20, 2011
129	"Christian Starts to Get Jealous with Derrick and Mara's Closeness"	April 25, 2011
130	"Alvira Is Willing to Hurt Her Loved Ones for Now Just to Prove Gary's Criminal Acts"	April 26, 2011
131	"Clara Tries to Manipulate Everyone for Her Own Good"	April 27, 2011
132	"Gary Fully Believes in Alvira's Love for Him"	April 28, 2011
133	"Alvira Suffers as She Goes Down Deep as Gary's New Girlfriend"	April 29, 2011
134	"Mara Runs Away from Her Kidnappers"	May 2, 2011
135	"Clara Is Surprised to See Alvira Coming to Mara's Aid"	May 3, 2011
136	"Clara Feels That No One Even Dares to Support Nor Believe Her"	May 4, 2011
137	"Gary Spreads Terror in Isla Verde"	May 5, 2011
138	"Gary Doesn't Let Anyone Intimidate Him"	May 6, 2011
139	"Mara Wishes to Go Back to Manila to Face Her Fears"	May 9, 2011
140	"Doom Clouds Everyone After Amante's Mishap"	May 10, 2011
141	"Lupe's Secret Is Shoveled Out in the Open"	May 11, 2011
142	"Alvira and Her Family Breathe a Sigh of Relief After Putting Gary in Jail"	May 12, 2011
143	"Mara Believes That Clara Knows the Truth Behind Gary's Lies and Schemes"	May 13, 2011
144	"Gary Becomes More Impatient After Being Separated from Lupe"	May 16, 2011
145	"Alvira Suffers from Pretending to Be in Love with Gary"	May 17, 2011
146	"Clara and Lupe Are the Key Witnesses to Either Save or Convict Gary"	May 18, 2011
147	"Gary Goes Ballistic After Seeing His Mother in Court"	May 19, 2011
148	"The Davids Try to Reunite as a Family"	May 20, 2011
149	"What Can Mara Do to Ultimately Provoke Gary?"	May 23, 2011
150	"Gary Gets His Share of Doom in Prison"	May 24, 2011
151	"The Del Valles Plan to Leave the Country"	May 25, 2011
152	"Gary Takes Alvira as Hostage"	May 26, 2011
153	"Mara Believes That Clara Will Lead Her to Alvira"	May 27, 2011
154	"How Can Alvira and Mara Escape from the Evil Hands of Gary?"	May 30, 2011
155	"Gary Yells at Clara Telling Her How Disappointed He Is with Her Sudden Change of Heart"	May 31, 2011
156	"Will Clara Be Able to Redeem Herself and Start Anew?"	June 1, 2011
157	"Despite the Demonic Things He Has Done, Clara Still Wishes That His Father Won't Be Hurt"	June 2, 2011
158	"Finale"	June 3, 2011
