= List of Noah (TV series) episodes =

Noah is a 2010–2011 Philippine adventure fantasy drama television series directed by Malu L. Sevilla and Lino S. Cayetano. The series stars Piolo Pascual and Zaijian Jaranilla. The series premiered on ABS-CBN's Primetime Bida nighttime block, replacing Kung Tayo'y Magkakalayo in Agua Bendita's timeslot from July 12, 2010 to February 4, 2011.

== Series overview ==
Year	Episodes	No. of episodes	No. of episodes (overall)	First aired	Last aired	First aired (overall)	Last aired (overall)
2010	1–82	82	124	July 12, 2010	November 3, 2010	July 12, 2010	December 31, 2010
2010	83–109	27	124	November 4, 2010	December 10, 2010	July 12, 2010	December 31, 2010
2010	110–124	15	124	December 13, 2010	December 31, 2010	July 12, 2010	December 31, 2010
2011	125–127	3	25	January 3, 2011	January 5, 2011	January 3, 2011	February 4, 2011
2011	128–139	10	25	January 6, 2011	January 21, 2011	January 3, 2011	February 4, 2011
2011	140–149	10	25	January 24, 2011	February 4, 2011	January 3, 2011	February 4, 2011

== Episodes ==
=== 2010 ===
==== Episodes 1–82 ====
Due to weather problems caused by the typhoon Basyang, the first 4 episodes of the series were replayed as a marathon named "Noah: The Marathon Special" on July 17, 2010.

No.	Title	Original release date
Noah: The Marathon Special (1–4)
1	"The Story of Love and Family That Leads You into a Euphoric Adventure"	July 12, 2010
2	"Jacob Drifts Away to a Mysterious Island with a Group of Old Looking Apes"	July 13, 2010
3	"Gabriel Fights to Find His Missing Son"	July 14, 2010
4	"Eli Finds an Extraordinary Thing"	July 16, 2010
Episodes 5–83
5	"Eli Gets Disappointed for Not Having a Tail on His Birthday"	July 19, 2010
6	"Gabriel Is Back to Work and Gets a New Police Partner"	July 20, 2010
7	"Eli Finds Out the Truth About His Identity"	July 21, 2010
8	"Gabriel Is Hopeful to Find His Son in His New Case"	July 22, 2010
9	"Will Eli Escape from Isla Noah?"	July 23, 2010
10	"Will Gabriel and Ruth Be Able to Find Their Son Jacob?"	July 26, 2010
11	"Eva, the Forest Fairy of the Island, Helps Eli and Ram for Their Task"	July 27, 2010
12	"Gabriel Seeks Help from Dr. Eliazar to Find Noah"	July 28, 2010
13	"Gabriel's Journey in Search of Noah Begins"	July 29, 2010
14	"Will Gabriel Succeed in His Mission to Find Eli?"	July 30, 2010
15	"A Tornado Strikes and Destroys the Livelihood of Island Noah"	August 2, 2010
16	"Gabriel and Eli Finally Meet by Accident"	August 3, 2010
17	"Ungtas Hunt Down Gabriel"	August 4, 2010
18	"Will Gabriel Be Able to Find Noah Again?"	August 5, 2010
19	"Judah Finds Out That Ruth and Gabriel Still See Each Other"	August 6, 2010
20	"Caleb and Goliath Invade the Outside World"	August 9, 2010
21	"Gabriel Is Determined to Find the Lost Ungtas"	August 10, 2010
22	"Gideon Finds Dr. Eliazar"	August 11, 2010
23	"Gideon Asks Dr. Eliazar for Help to Find His Brother Caleb"	August 12, 2010
24	"Gabriel Wants to Return to Isla Noah"	August 13, 2010
25	"Eli Leads the Ungtas in Destroying the Buwa-Buwa"	August 16, 2010
26	"Gideon Convinces Caleb to return to Isla Noah"	August 17, 2010
27	"Can Gideon Survive His Critical Condition?"	August 18, 2010
28	"Gabriel Tries to Take Away Eli from the Ungtas"	August 19, 2010
29	"Eli Starts to Ask About Gabriel"	August 20, 2010
30	"Levi Doubts the Motives of Naomi"	August 23, 2010
31	"Judah Pays Toro to Keep His Secrets from Coming Out"	August 24, 2010
32	"Gabriel Starts to Integrate Himself in the Lives of the Ungtas"	August 25, 2010
33	"Eli's Life is at Risk in the Hands of Caleb"	August 26, 2010
34	"Gabriel and Eli Start Training for Eli's Mission"	August 27, 2010
35	"Levi and Naomi Begin to Know Each Other Better"	August 30, 2010
36	"Sarah Does Not Allow Rebecca to Step on Her Being"	August 31, 2010
37	"Eli gets to Face the Creature 'Kamaraw'"	September 1, 2010
38	"Naomi and Levi Struggle to Escape from Their Kidnappers"	September 2, 2010
39	"Caleb Tries to Steal the Key to the Last Paradise from Eli and Gabriel"	September 3, 2010
40	"Gabriel Encourages Eli to Visit the Land of Humans"	September 6, 2010
41	"Judah Tells Naomi to Stay Away from Levi"	September 7, 2010
42	"Gabriel Seeks Help from Forest Fairy Eva to Find Eli"	September 8, 2010
43	"Eli Gets Help from a Himbagat as He Continues with His Mission"	September 9, 2010
44	"Eva Starts to Fall for Gabriel"	September 10, 2010
45	"Ruth Has a Miscarriage and Loses the Child in Her Womb"	September 13, 2010
46	"Jacob Begins to Miss His Ungta Family and Friends"	September 14, 2010
47	"Jacob Finds Difficulty Adjusting to His New Environment"	September 15, 2010
48	"Gabriel Starts Getting Frustrated with Jacob"	September 16, 2010
49	"Gabriel Gets Shot in the Line of Duty"	September 17, 2010
50	"Caleb Becomes the Leader of the Ungtas"	September 20, 2010
51	"Gabriel Tells His Experiences in Finding Jacob"	September 21, 2010
52	"Judah Feels Threatened with the Return of Jacob and Gabriel to Ruth's Life"	September 22, 2010
53	"Judah Asks Naomi to Spy on Gabriel and Ruth"	September 23, 2010
54	"Rebecca Finds a Way to Get Jacob from Gabriel (Paglayo kay Jacob kay Gabriel)"	September 24, 2010
55	"Eva Follows in the World of Humans to Try to Protect Eli"	September 27, 2010
56	"Ruth Witnesses the Presence of Eva in Gabriel's Family"	September 28, 2010
57	"Ruth and Rebecca Doubt Eva and Her Mission"	September 29, 2010
58	"Gabriel Takes Jacob to a Secluded Place to Protect Him"	September 30, 2010
59	"Ruth Helps Gabriel in Protecting Jacob"	October 1, 2010
60	"Ruth Fights for Custody of Jacob in Court"	October 4, 2010
61	"Ruth Wins Custody of Jacob over Gabriel"	October 5, 2010
62	"Jacob Makes a Bad First Impression to Nika"	October 6, 2010
63	"Tessa Reveals Her True Intentions for Returning to Judah's Life"	October 7, 2010
64	"Jacob Starts to Go to School"	October 8, 2010
65	"Naomi Helps Jacob in Gaining Self-Confidence"	October 11, 2010
66	"Tessa Reveals the Truth About Judah and Ruth's Marriage"	October 12, 2010
67	"Judah Sues Gabriel to Exact Revenge"	October 13, 2010
68	"Eva Finds a Way to Help Gabriel in Their Finances"	October 14, 2010
69	"Gabriel Does Everything to Find Jacob"	October 15, 2010
70	"Gabriel and Eva Finally Find Jacob and Nika"	October 18, 2010
71	"Gabriel Receives a TRO from the Court"	October 19, 2010
72	"Jacob Finds a Way to See His Dad"	October 20, 2010
73	"Gabriel is Assigned to a New Case that is Connected to Gideon"	October 21, 2010
74	"Gabriel Continues His Search for Gideon"	October 22, 2010
75	"Caleb and His Friends Go to the City to Search for Gabriel and Jacob"	October 25, 2010
76	"Gabriel and Levi Set Out to Find the Ungtas in the City"	October 26, 2010
77	"Gabriel and Levi Finally Find the Ungtas"	October 27, 2010
78	"Tatang Zatok Is Held Captive by Judah's Men"	October 28, 2010
79	"Ruth Finally Meets Ada"	October 29, 2010
80	"Jacob Discloses the Threat in His and Gabriel's Life"	November 1, 2010
81	"Jacob Is Abducted by Caleb"	November 2, 2010
82	"Gabriel and Levi Encounter Caleb"	November 3, 2010

==== Episodes 83–109 ====
No.	Title	Original release date
83	"Naomi Helps Ada and Lotlot"	November 4, 2010
84	"Judah and Ruth Desire to Visit Isla Noah"	November 5, 2010
85	"Judah and His Men Finally Reach Noah Island"	November 8, 2010
86	"Judah Vows to Take Hold of the Treasures of Noah Even If It Means Killing the Ungtas"	November 9, 2010
87	"Jacob and Nica Defend Themselves Against Caleb"	November 10, 2010
88	"Jacob Plans on Going Back to Island Noah"	November 11, 2010
89	"Caleb Follows Jacob and Nica to Isla Noah"	November 12, 2010
90	"Gabriel Seeks Jacob's Trust and Forgiveness"	November 15, 2010
91	"As Jacob Goes Home, Judah Starts a Fight with Gabriel"	November 16, 2010
92	"Jacob Returns Home and Secretly Keeps His Ungta Friend from His Family"	November 17, 2010
93	"Ruth's Protection for Jacob Finally Takes a Toll When Judah Physically Hurts Her"	November 18, 2010
94	"Nica and Lotlot Begin to Doubt Judah's True Motives"	November 19, 2010
95	"Although Gabriel and Jacob's Communication Continue to Falter, Their Longing for Each Other Continue to Grow"	November 22, 2010
96	"Judah Makes Sure That Ruth Can't Go Anywhere After She Confessed Her Love for Gabriel"	November 23, 2010
97	"Ruth Plays Along with Judah's Change of Heart"	November 24, 2010
98	"Judah is One Step Ahead of Ruth When She Tries to Escape with Jacob"	November 25, 2010
99	"Judah Tells Jacob with Great Pride That Gabriel Fell of a Cliff and Died"	November 26, 2010
100	"Gabriel Plans on How to Save Noah Now That He is Believed to Be the Chosen One in the Prophecy"	November 29, 2010
101	"Ruth and Jacob Escape from Judah with Gabriel's Help"	November 30, 2010
102	"Gabriel, Ruth and Jacob Make Up for Lost Their Time as a Family"	December 1, 2010
103	"Gabriel and Ruth Reconnect as They Take Care of Jacob"	December 2, 2010
104	"Tessa Threatens Judah That She Will Tell Everyone about the Truth of His Marriage and Nica"	December 3, 2010
105	"Jacob Expresses His Wish to Have a Complete Family"	December 6, 2010
106	"Nica Blames Gabriel for Her Mother's Death"	December 7, 2010
107	"Gabriel is Thrown to Jail After Being Suspected of Tessa's Death"	December 8, 2010
108	"Nica Tells Judah that She Prefers Gabriel as a Father"	December 9, 2010
109	"Gabriel's Court Appeal is Denied Leaving Him Stuck in Jail"	December 10, 2010

==== Episodes 110–124 ====
No.	Title	Original release date
110	"Gabriel Escapes from Jail and Plans to Exonerate Himself on His Own"	December 13, 2010
111	"Gabriel Takes His Family Away from the City to Escape from Judah"	December 14, 2010
112	"Gabriel Goes Back to the City to Find Clues on Who Set Him Up"	December 15, 2010
113	"Judah Uses the Other Ungtas as Bait to Lure Out Gabriel and His Family"	December 16, 2010
114	"Sarah and Ruth are Torn If They Can Trust Rebecca to Bring Down Judah"	December 17, 2010
115	"Gabriel Exerts Extra Effort for His Family to Be Together for Christmas"	December 20, 2010
116	"Gabriel Meets Up with Partner Levi as a Part of His Master Plan to Bring Down Judah"	December 21, 2010
117	"How Will Nica Handle the Truth about Tess and Judah?"	December 22, 2010
118	"Gabriel and Levi Look for Evidence to Pin Tessa's Death on Judah"	December 23, 2010
119	"Levi Suffers the Price of True Friendship"	December 24, 2010
120	"After Being Exonerated, Gabriel Can Go Back to the Police Force"	December 27, 2010
121	"Rebecca Decides to Stay Away from Jacob for Her Grandson's Sake"	December 28, 2010
122	"Judah Uses the Ungtas to Get Ruth Back"	December 29, 2010
123	"Gabriel and Ruth Express Their True Feelings for Each Other After a Life Threatening Incident"	December 30, 2010
124	"After Rekindling His Love for Ruth and Reuniting with His Family, Gabriel, Together with Levi Hunt Down Judah"	December 31, 2010

=== 2011 ===
==== Episodes 125–127 ====
No.	Title	Original release date
125	"Jacob Assures Ruth That Gabriel Will Be Safe and Sound"	January 3, 2011
126	"Although Already Apprehended, Judah Continues to Destroy Gabriel's Reputation as He Plots His Plan to Escape from Jail"	January 4, 2011
127	"Wedding Bells are Heard as Gabriel and Ruth Prepare to Exchange Their Vows"	January 5, 2011

==== Episodes 128–139 ====
No.	Title	Original release date
128	"Gabriel Goes After Judah and the Ungtas After Escaping from Jail"	January 6, 2011
129	"As Part of His Revenge, Judah Corners Ruth and the Rest of the Family in Their House"	January 7, 2011
130	"Jacob and Nica's Lives Will Be in Peril When Judah Kidnaps Them"	January 10, 2011
131	"Ruth Sacrifices Herself to Judah in Exchange for Nica and Jacob's Lives"	January 11, 2011
132	"Judah's Ultimate Plan is Revealed as He and His Men Go Back to Isla Noah"	January 12, 2011
133	"Earthquakes Shatter the Human World as Judah Invade and Steal from the Ungta's Paradise"	January 13, 2011
134	"Happy Endings Escape from Gabriel as One of His Love Ones Face Death Yet Again"	January 14, 2011
135	"How Will Gabriel Prevent His Premonitions from Coming True?"	January 17, 2011
136	"While Gabriel Figures Out the Next Victim in His Premonition, Judah Joins Forces with Caleb"	January 18, 2011
137	"Gabriel Asks Help from the Public to Capture Judah"	January 19, 2011
138	"Gabriel Tells Rebecca the Things He Foresaw"	January 20, 2011
139	"Judah Corners Ruth and the Rest of the Family in Their House"	January 21, 2011

==== Episodes 140–149 ====
No.	Title	Original release date
Episodes 140–144 - Noah: 2 Huling Linggo (The Last 2 Weeks)
140	"Gabriel Mistakenly Believed That Judah is Dead"	January 24, 2011
141	"Blindsighted by Judah's Fake Death, Gabriel Tells His Family That the Worst is Over"	January 25, 2011
142	"Gabriel and Ruth Move on with Their Lives by Planning Their Wedding"	January 26, 2011
143	"Gabriel Fears That His Dreams Might Still Reoccur"	January 27, 2011
144	"Ruth Confronts Gabriel about His Dream"	January 28, 2011
Episodes 145–149 - Noah: Huling Linggo (The Last Week/The Last 5 Nights)
145	"Gabriel's Dream Continue to Happen in a Different Way"	January 31, 2011
146	"Ruth Is Held Captive as Judah Execute His Plans to Destroy Gabriel"	February 1, 2011
147	"Gabriel Continues in Tracing Down Judah Alone"	February 2, 2011
148	"Terror Is Bound to Happen Now That Judah Has the Keys to the Hidden Paradise"	February 3, 2011
149	"Gabriel, Jacob and the Ungtas Unite to Defeat Judah and Save the World from Peril"	February 4, 2011
