= Aaron Agassi =

Filipino actor and singer

- Born: Ahmad Aaron Vahidi Agassi; March 29, 1988 (age 38); Philippines
- Occupations: Actor; singer
- Relatives: Carlos Agassi (brother); Michael Agassi (brother)

Aaron Agassi is a Filipino actor and singer.

== Personal life ==
Agassi's older brothers are actors Carlos Agassi and Michael Agassi.

Agassi is a Christian.

== Filmography ==
=== Television ===
Year	Title	Role	Notes	Source
2006-07	Star Magic Presents; Abt Ur Luv	Ahmad		
2007	Komiks Presents : Pedro Penduko at ang Mga Engkantao	Arthur		
2007-08	Star Magic Presents: Abt Ur Luv, Ur Lyf 2	Ahmad		

== Discography ==
=== Studio albums ===
Title	Details
Aaron: Right Next to Me	Released: 2005; Format: CD; Label: Universal Music

=== As featured artist ===
List of singles as featured artist, with selected chart positions and certifications, showing year released and album name
Title	Year	Album
"True" (Carlos Agassi featuring Aaron Agassi and Gayle Dizon)	2005	Amir
"I'll Make It Real" (Katelyn Tarver featuring Aaron Agassi)	2005	Wonderful Crazy

=== Guest appearances ===
List of non-single guest appearances, with other performing artists, showing year released and album name
Title	Year	Other artist(s)	Album
"Señorita (Remix)" (with Cherry Lou and Gobas)	2005	Carlos Agassi	Amir

== Awards and nominations ==
Year	Work	Award	Category	Result	Source
2005		Aliw Awards	Best New Male Artist	Won	
2007	"Calculate It"	Awit Awards	Best Performance by a New Male Recording Artist	Nominated	
2007	"Calculate It"	Awit Awards	Best Dance Recording	Nominated	
