= I-Shine Talent Camp =

Philippine television reality show

i-Shine Talent Camp
- Title card
- Genre: Reality competition
- Presented by: Paolo Contis; Mikee Cojuangco-Jaworski; Jillian Ward; Dimples Romana; Matteo Guidicelli; Xian Lim
- Country of origin: Philippines
- Original language: Tagalog
- No. of seasons: 4
- No. of episodes: 29

Production
- Executive producer: Wilma Galvante
- Camera setup: Multiple-camera setup
- Running time: 30 minutes
- Production company: Wyeth Philippines

Original release
- Network: GMA Network (June 12, 2011 – July 31, 2011); ABS-CBN (June 23, 2012 – August 9, 2014)
- Release: June 12, 2011 – August 9, 2014

i-Shine Talent Camp is a Philippine television reality competition show broadcast by GMA Network and ABS-CBN. It premiered on June 12, 2011. The show concluded on August 9, 2014, with a total of four seasons and 29 episodes.

== Premise ==
The shows features kids ages from four to seven years old. For seasons 2 to 4, the prizes were Php 500,000 and a contract with Star Magic. While Php 200,000 and a contract with GMA Artist Center in the first season.

== Hosts ==
- Dimples Romana (ABS-CBN)
- Karylle (ABS-CBN)
- Xian Lim (ABS-CBN)
- Matteo Guidicelli (ABS-CBN)
- Paolo Contis (GMA Network)
- Mikee Cojuangco-Jaworski (GMA Network)
- Jillian Ward (GMA Network)

== Ratings ==
According to AGB Nielsen Philippines' Mega Manila household television ratings, the pilot episode of i-Shine Talent Camp earned an 8.8% rating. The final episode broadcast by GMA Network scored an 11.4% rating.
