= Cherry Lou =

Filipino actress

- Born: Cherry Lou Maglasang; December 30, 1982 (age 43); Ozamiz City, Misamis Occidental Province, Mindanao, Philippines
- Occupation: Actress
- Years active: 1996–2021
- Agent: Star Magic (2001–2016)
- Spouse: Michael Agassi (m. 2007; sep. 2019) Phytos Ramirez (m. 2024)
- Children: 3

Cherry Lou Maglasang - Kyriacou (born December 30, 1982) is a Filipino actress.

== Biography ==
Born in Ozamiz City to mother Lucile Maglasang and Galileo Maglasang, both notable entrepreneurs in the area, she was the second of four sisters in her family. She started her career as a singer with her sister, Cherrie Gal Maglasang, and created a band, "The Cherries", releasing two albums together "A Taste of Love" and "Higit sa Buhay" in the late 1990s. After her sister got married, she ventured off to another career as an actress in ABS-CBN and became a member of Star Magic. There she met her husband, actor Micheal Agassi. Agassi and Lou married in 2007 and had 3 kids. The two separated in 2019. In September 2020, Lou reveals her relationship with actor Phytos Ramirez. The couple got married in 2024.

== Filmography ==
=== Television ===
| Year | Title | Role | Notes | Source |
|---|---|---|---|---|
| 2001 | Whattamen | | | |
| 2001 | Sa Puso Ko Iingatan Ka | Julie | | |
| 2002 | Arriba, Arriba! | Sweet's new talent | Episode: "To Boobs or Not to Boobs" | |
| 2002 | Tabing Ilog | Melissa | | |
| 2003–04 | Basta't Kasama Kita | | | |
| 2005 | Spirits | Diwata ng Tubig | | |
| 2006 | Sa Piling Mo | | | |
| 2006–07 | Milyonaryong Mini | Petra | | |
| 2006 | Komiks Presents: Sandok Ni Boninay | | | |
| 2009 | Dahil May Isang Ikaw | Patty Ancheta | | |
| 2009–10 | George and Cecil | Myra | | |
| 2010 | Maalaala Mo Kaya | Ana | Episode: "Kwintas" | |
| 2010 | Precious Hearts Romances Presents: Impostor | Young Valeria Florencio | | |
| 2010 | Rosalka | Connie | | |
| 2010 | Mara Clara | Vanessa Torralba | | |
| 2010 | Maalaala Mo Kaya | Marietta | Episode: "Parol" | |
| 2011 | Reputasyon | Tina Dominguez | | |
| 2011 | Ikaw ay Pag-Ibig | | | |
| 2012 | Maria la del Barrio | Christina Ruiz | | |
| 2012 | E-Boy | Claire Villareal | Credited as "Cherry Lou Maglasang" | |
| 2013 | Wansapanataym | | Episode: "Teacher's Pest" | |
| 2013 | Maalaala Mo Kaya | | Episode: "Family Picture" | |
| 2015 | Pangako Sa'Yo | Sheila | | |
| 2015 | Ipaglaban Mo! | Myrna | Episode: "Akusayon" | |

=== Film ===
| Year | Title | Role | Notes | Source |
|---|---|---|---|---|
| 2002 | Jologs | Prostitute | | |
| 2002 | Got 2 Believe | Toni's bridesmaid | | |
| 2003 | Mr. Suave: Hoy! Hoy! Hoy! Hoy! Hoy! Hoy! | | | |
| 2004 | Otso-Otso Pamela-Mela Wan | Pamela Lou | | |
| 2021 | Solo Para Adultos (For Adults Only) | Prostitute at the Bar | | |

== Discography ==
=== As featured artist ===
List of singles as featured artist, with selected chart positions and certifications, showing year released and album name
| Title | Year | Album |
|---|---|---|
| "Señorita" (Carlos Agassi featuring Cherry Lou) | 2005 | Amir |

=== Guest appearances ===
List of non-single guest appearances, with other performing artists, showing year released and album name
| Title | Year | Other artist(s) | Album |
|---|---|---|---|
| "Señorita (Remix)" (with Gobas and Aaron Agassi) | 2005 | Carlos Agassi | Amir |
