= Elemento =

2014 Philippine television drama series

- Title card
- Genre: Docudrama; Horror
- Directed by: Topel Lee
- Country of origin: Philippines
- Original language: Tagalog
- No. of episodes: 4

Production
- Camera setup: Multiple-camera setup
- Running time: 26–30 minutes
- Production company: GMA News and Public Affairs

Original release
- Network: GMA Network
- Release: October 10 – October 31, 2014

Elemento (transl. element) is a 2014 Philippine television docudrama horror anthology series broadcast by GMA Network. Directed by Topel Lee, it premiered on October 10, 2014 on the network's Telebabad line up. The series concluded on October 31, 2014, with a total of four episodes.

The series is streaming online on YouTube.

== Cast and characters ==
"Si Esperanza, Ang Rebeldeng Manananggal"

- Glaiza de Castro as Esperanza
- Valerie Concepcion as Lucida
- Maria Isabel Lopez as Esperanza's mother

"Ang Masayahing Kapre na si Itim"

- Raul Dillo as Itim
- Bodjie Pascua
- Ping Medina
- Irma Adlawan
- Lou Veloso
- Joshen Bernardo
- Kyle Ocampo
- Milkah Nacion
- Micko Laurente

"Pandora, Ang Diwata ng Wawa"

- Solenn Heussaff as Pandora
- Carlos Agassi as James

"Apoy ni Bambolito"

- Mike "Pekto" Nacua as Bambolito
- Kristofer Martin
- Bela Padilla
- Rochelle Pangilinan
- Eula Valdez

== Ratings ==
According to AGB Nielsen Philippines' Mega Manila household television ratings, the pilot episode of Elemento earned a 16.1% rating. The final episode scored a 14.3% rating.
