= Toothbrush (Maalaala Mo Kaya) =

- Maalaala Mo Kaya episode
- Episode no.: Season 24; Episode 5
- Directed by: Raz de la Torre
- Written by: Rose Colindres; Arah Jell Badayos
- Original air date: February 6, 2016

Guest appearances
- Dimples Romana as Leni Robredo; Marvin Agustin as Jesse Robredo; Sofia Andres as Jessica Marie "Aika" Robredo; Inah de Belen Estrada as Tricia Robredo; Mutya Orquia as Jill Robredo

Episode chronology
← Previous "Singsing"	Next → "Puno"

"Toothbrush" is the fifth episode of the 24th season of the Filipino drama anthology series Maalaala Mo Kaya (MMK). Written by Rose Colindres and Arah Jell Badayos and directed by Raz de la Torre, it aired on ABS-CBN in the Philippines on February 6, 2016. Announced on February 2, 2016, the episode depicts the life of Leni Robredo, portrayed by Dimples Romana. Robredo was previously depicted in the 2013 MMK episode "Tsinelas", which was conversely about the life of her late politician husband, Jesse Robredo.

The episode aired three days before the start of the campaign period for the 2016 Philippine presidential election, in which Leni Robredo was a candidate for the vice presidency.

== Production ==
The episode was first reported in the Filipino-language tabloid Pilipino Star Ngayon on January 24, 2016, while it was officially announced on February 2, 2016.

== Reception ==
On the Saturday it aired, "Toothbrush" received a rating of 25.9% according to Kantar Media, slightly behind another weekend anthology program Magpakailanman, which received 26.5% for its episode in the same evening.
