= Dimples Romana =

Filipina actress and television host (born 1984)

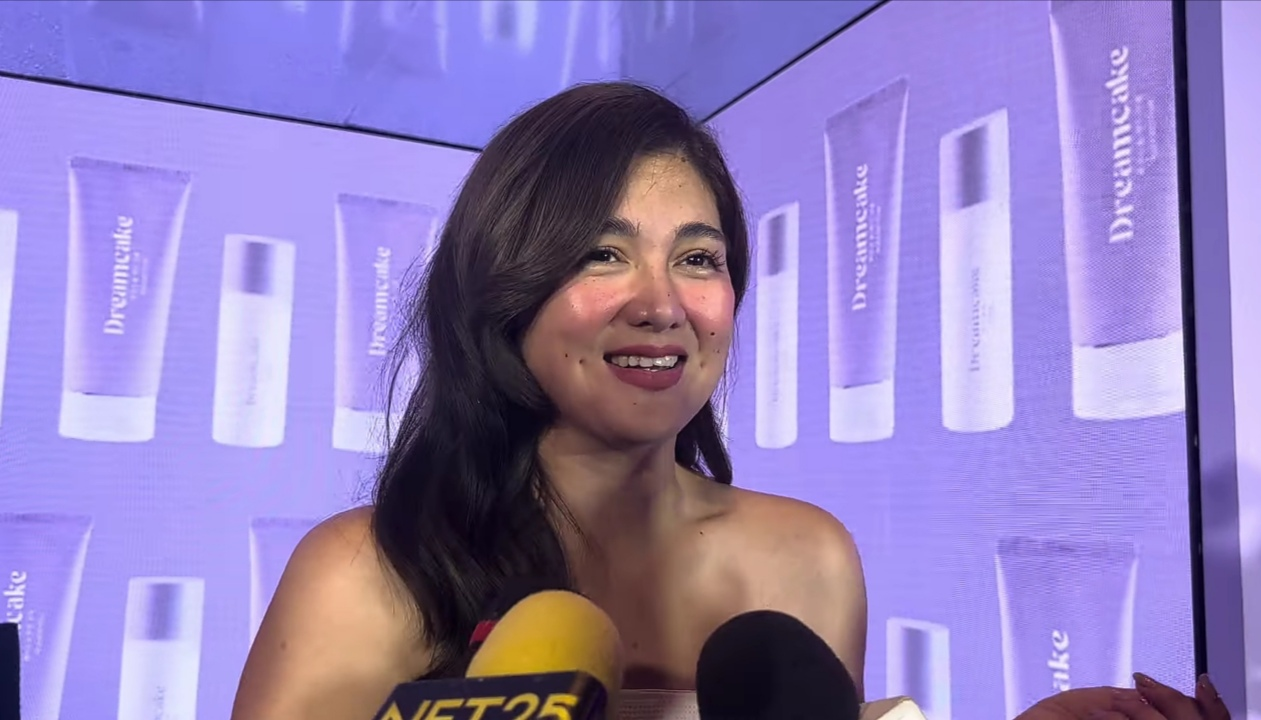
- Romana in 2023
- Born: Dianne Marie Bonifacio Romana; November 13, 1984 (age 42); Parañaque, Metro Manila, Philippines
- Education: Enderun Colleges (BS)
- Occupations: Actress; television host; endorser; businesswoman; author; news anchor
- Years active: 1988–present
- Agent: Star Magic (1996–present)
- Spouse: Romeo Adecer Ahmee Jr. (m. 2004)
- Children: 3

Dianne Marie "Dimples" Romana Ahmee (born November 13, 1984) is a Filipino actress. Noted for her acclaimed performances in film and television, she made her first screen appearance through the series Esperanza (1997–1999). Her accolades include three Gawad Tanglaw Awards, a Metro Manila Film Festival Award, and two PMPC Star Awards for Television, in addition to nominations from the Asian Academy Creative Awards, FAMAS Awards, Gawad Urian Awards and Golden Screen Awards. Since 2024, she has served as a juror of the International Academy of Television Arts and Sciences.

== Early life and education ==
Dianne Marie Bonifacio Romana was born on November 13, 1984, in Parañaque, Metro Manila. She studied tourism at the University of Santo Tomas, where she served as a courtside reporter for the UST Growling Tigers during UAAP Seasons 65 and 66 (2002–2004). Romana later graduated with a Bachelor of Science degree in international hospitality management, majoring in culinary arts, from Enderun Colleges.

1==Acting career== In 1988, she started her career as a child actress in the movie Nektar.

In the early '90s, Romana began her television career as a host for the children's magazine show Chikiting Patrol on GMA Network.

After she finished her studies, Romana's first appearance as a supporting antagonist role on TV was via Esperanza in 1997; and after which she became one of the stars of the ABS-CBN series, Tabing Ilog in 1999.

In 2005, she was cast in ABS-CBN's Ang Panday and appeared in the film Dubai. The following year, she starred in Pacquiao: The Movie and the horror film 'Wag Kang Lilingon. Romana also starred in the 2007 film One More Chance.

Additionally, she was in Dubai. The next year she starred in Pacquiao: The Movie and the horror film, 'Wag Kang Lilingon. Romana also starred in 2007 film One More Chance.

In 2008, she once again co-starred in the Star Cinema's film When Love Begins. She was cast in the film Love Me Again.

In 2009, Romana starred in the television series Only You.

In 2010, Romana played Criselda Barrameda, the main antagonist of the series Agua Bendita. Later that year, she was in the remake version of Mara Clara as Alvira Del Valle. Her character name was renamed from Almira to Alvira, which was first portrayed by Beverly Vergel.

In 2019, she gained mainstream recognition as Daniella Mondragon-Bartolome in the afternoon drama series Kadenang Ginto. A still photo of Romana's character flamboyantly strolling with a briefcase later became the subject of an internet meme, spawning numerous photoshopped images of the Daniela character being depicted as traveling to different places and fictional universes. Romana would later parody her role in a number of commercials and guest appearances, and was named an ambassador for the Department of Tourism.

After giving birth to her third child, she joined The Iron Heart as Selene, one of the major figures under the Tatsulok crime syndicate of the series. In 2024, she played a role on a sequel series to Senior High as the main antagonist Victoria "Tori" Soler, High Street.

== Other ventures ==
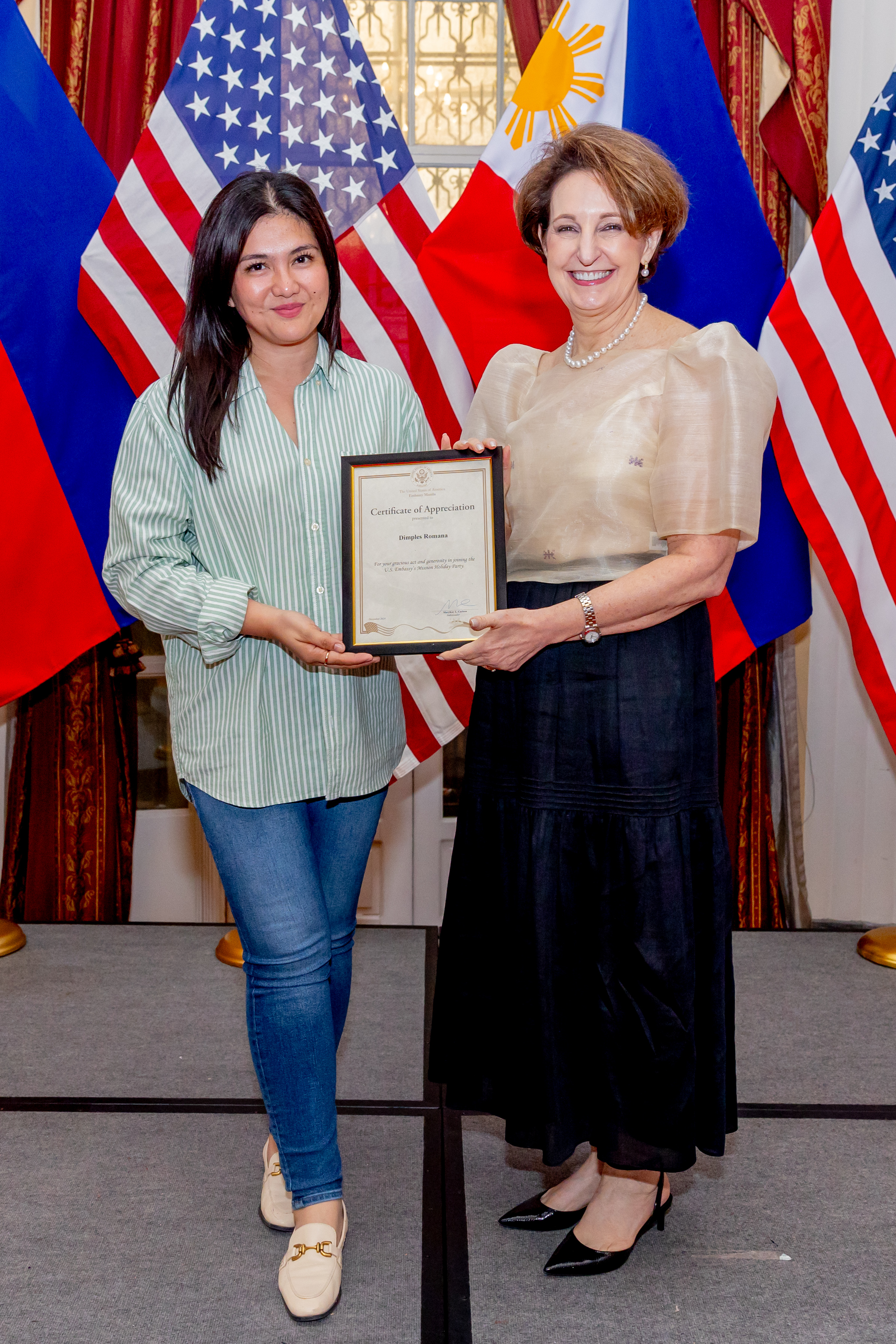
Romana (left) with United States Ambassador to the Philippines MaryKay Carlson in 2024

=== Business ===
Romana is a co-owner of Asia's Lashes Beauty Center in 2018. She also launched her own skin brand, DReam Cake in 2023.

Romana and her husband own a farm in Calaca, Batangas, for avocadoes, mangoes and corn. Since 2021, they have been co-owners of Alegria, a restaurant in Singapore.

== Personal life ==
Romana married Romeo "Boyet" Adecer Ahmee Jr. in 2004 and they have three children, Christiana Amanda Lauren "Callie" (born 2003), Alonzo Romeo Jose (born 2015), and Elio Juan Manolo (born 2022). Romana's daughter, Callie studied aviation in Gold Coast, Queensland, Australia, in August 2022 and became a licensed commercial pilot on February 28, 2024.

In 2017, Romana and Ahmee built a house in Alfonso, Cavite. In the early 2020s, they acquired a condominium in Makati.

== Acting credits ==
=== Film ===
Key
| † | Denotes films that have not yet been released |

Dimples Romana's film credits with year of release, film titles and roles
| Year | Title | Role | Ref. |
|---|---|---|---|
| 1998 | Kung Ayaw Mo, Huwag Mo! | Bettina | |
| 2001 | Minsan May Isang Puso | Irene | |
| 2002 | Dekada '70 | Evelyn | |
| 2003 | Noon at Ngayon: Pagsasamang Kay Ganda | Miriam | |
| 2004 | All My Life | Kat | |
| 2004 | Minsan Pa | Cristy | |
| 2005 | Dubai | Clarisse | |
| 2006 | Pacquiao: The Movie | Emong's Wife | |
| 2006 | Wag Kang Lilingon | Trixie | |
| 2007 | Still Life | | |
| 2007 | Chopsuey | Claire Wong-Chua | |
| 2007 | One More Chance | Kristine "Krizzy" Del Rosario | |
| 2007 | Altar | Angie | |
| 2008 | Huling Pasada | | |
| 2008 | When Love Begins | Carrie | |
| 2009 | Love Me Again | Yna | |
| 2009 | In My Life | Dang Salvacion | |
| 2010 | Tsardyer | Leslie | |
| 2010 | Senior Year | Sophia Marasigan (adult) | |
| 2011 | Bulong | Chelsea | |
| 2011 | My Neighbor's Wife | Tessa | |
| 2011 | Shake, Rattle & Roll 13 | Rowanna | |
| 2012 | Shake, Rattle and Roll Fourteen: The Invasion | Filomena | |
| 2013 | Tuhog | Lolet | |
| 2014 | Third Eye | Belen | |
| 2014 | Beauty in a Bottle | Anna | |
| 2015 | Must Date The Playboy | Andrea Andres | |
| 2015 | A Second Chance | Kristine "Krizzy" Del Rosario | |
| 2016 | The Escort | Brenda | |
| 2016 | The Unmarried Wife | Carmela | |
| 2017 | Deadma Walking | Mary | |
| 2018 | My Fairy Tail Love Story | Natasha Quejada | |
| 2018 | My Perfect You | Ellaine Toledo | |
| 2018 | Unli Life | Virginia | |
| 2019 | The Mall, The Merrier | Tita Moody | |
| 2020 | Block Z | Bebeth | |
| 2025 | The Caretakers | Lydia | |
| 2025 | Kontrabida Academy | Insult Teacher | |
| 2025 | Love You So Bad | Tita Eve | |

=== Television ===
Key
| † | Denotes films that have not yet been released |

Dimples Romana's television credits with year of release, television titles and roles
| Year | Title | Role | Notes | Ref. |
|---|---|---|---|---|
| 1990–96 | Chikiting Patrol | Host | | |
| 1996 | Oki Doki Doc | Herself | Guest star | |
| 1999–2003 | Tabing Ilog | Jacqueline "Jackie" Esguerra | | |
| 2000 | Maalaala Mo Kaya: Life Story Book | Grownup Analyn | | |
| 2000 | Gags Must Be Crazy | | | |
| 2001–03 | Planet X | Herself | Host | |
| 2001 | Maalaala Mo Kaya: Banyo | Elsa | | |
| 2001 | Recuerdo de Amor | Teen Josephina | | |
| 2002 | Anna Karenina | Young Carmela Cruz-Monteclaro | | |
| 2002–03 | Kay Tagal Kang Hinintay | Kayla "Pards" Reneza | | |
| 2005 | In DA Money | | | |
| 2006 | Carlo J. Caparas' Ang Panday | Manaram | | |
| 2007 | Sineserye Presents: May Minamahal | Trina Tagle | | |
| 2008 | Lobo | Trixie | | |
| 2009 | Tayong Dalawa | Young Elizabeth "Mamita" Martinez | | |
| 2009 | Jim Fernandez's Kambal sa Uma | Young Milagros Perea | | |
| 2009 | Only You | Dina Javier | | |
| 2009 | Komiks Presents: Mars Ravelo's Nasaan Ka Maruja? | Dianne Gomez | | |
| 2009–10 | George and Cecil | Charlotte "Charlie" Castro | | |
| 2010 | Rod Santiago's Agua Bendita | Criselda Barrameda | | |
| 2010 | Maalaala Mo Kaya: Kalapati | Imelda Marcos | | |
| 2010 | Maalaala Mo Kaya: Makinilya | Imelda Marcos | | |
| 2010 | Your Song: Gimik 2010 | Shirley "Bingbing" Marquez | | |
| 2010 | Magkaribal | Stella Abella | | |
| 2010–11 | Emil Cruz, Jr.'s Mara Clara | Alvira Castillo-Del Valle | | |
| 2011 | Wansapanataym: Sabay-Sabay Pasaway | Mrs. Ferrer | | |
| 2011 | Wansapanataym: My Gulay | Mrs. Galvez | | |
| 2011 | 100 Days to Heaven | Angela Carlos | | |
| 2011 | Maalaala Mo Kaya: Niagara Falls | Delia | | |
| 2011–12 | Ikaw ay Pag-Ibig | Agnes Alvarez | | |
| 2011–2020 | Swak na Swak | Herself | | |
| 2012 | Oka Tokat | Alice | | |
| 2012 | Maalaala Mo Kaya: Kape | Michelle | | |
| 2012 | Lorenzo's Time | Susan Montereal | | |
| 2012 | Wansapanataym: Kuha Mo | Jane | | |
| 2012 | Maalaala Mo Kaya: Relo | Myra | | |
| 2012–2013 | A Beautiful Affair | Emilia "Emy" Biglang-awa | | |
| 2013–2016 | TFC Connect | | | |
| 2013 | Maalaala Mo Kaya: Kamison | Rina | | |
| 2013 | Wansapanataym: Kuku Takot | Tammy | | |
| 2013 | Muling Buksan Ang Puso | Young Adelina Laurel-Beltran | | |
| 2013 | Maalaala Mo Kaya: Walis | Monique | | |
| 2013–2014 | Promil Pre-school: I-Shine Talent Camp | Herself - Host | | |
| 2014 | Maalaala Mo Kaya: Pagkain | Maria Antonia "Mary Ann" Usher | | |
| 2014 | Mirabella | Daisy Arboleda | | |
| 2014 | Sana Bukas pa ang Kahapon | Alicia Del Mundo-Gaspar | | |
| 2014 | Give Love on Christmas: The Gift Giver | Julie Aguinaldo-Salcedo | | |
| 2015 | Pasión de Amor | Young Maria Eduvina Suarez | | |
| 2015–2016 | And I Love You So | Michelle Ramirez | | |
| 2016 | Maalaala Mo Kaya: Toothbrush | Leni Robredo | | |
| 2016–2017 | The Greatest Love | Amanda "Mandy" Alegre-Cruz | | |
| 2017 | Maalaala Mo Kaya: Picture | Idai | | |
| 2018 | Bagani | Gloria | | |
| 2018 | Maalaala Mo Kaya: Kalabaw | Lerma Dia | | |
| 2018–2020 | Kadenang Ginto | Daniela "Dani" Mondragon-Bartolome | | |
| 2020–2021 | Oh My Dad! | Cassandra "Sandra" Bergado-Balderama | | |
| 2021 | Maalaala Mo Kaya: Sobre | Shiela Delos Santos | | |
| 2021 | Huwag Kang Mangamba | Fatima "Faith" Cruz-Cordero / Lucia Angeles | | |
| 2021–2022 | Viral Scandal | Karla "Kakay" Meneses-Sicat | | |
| 2022–2023 | The Iron Heart | Selene Larisa | | |
| 2023–2026 | Gud Morning Kapatid | Herself | Host | |
| 2023–present | Frontline sa Umaga | Herself | Anchor | |
| 2024 | High Street | Victoria "Tori" Soler-Castrodes / Corazon Garcia | | |
| 2024 | Rainbow Rumble | Herself | Contestant | |
| 2025 | Maalaala Mo Kaya: Bahay | Lovella Maguad | | |
| 2025 | Maalaala Mo Kaya: Envelope | Lovella Maguad | | |
| 2026 | Someone, Someday | Precious "Tita Pres" Amador | | |

== Awards and nominations ==
| Year | Work | Award | Category | Result | Source |
|---|---|---|---|---|---|
| 2008 | One More Chance | FAMAS Awards | Best Supporting Actress | Nominated | |
| 2009 | Love Me Again | FAMAS Awards | Best Supporting Actress | Nominated | |
| 2010 | In My Life | Gawad Urian | Best Supporting Actress | Nominated | |
| 2011 | Mara Clara | Golden Screen TV Awards | Outstanding Supporting Actress in a Drama Series | Nominated | |
| 2012 | My Neighbor's Wife | Golden Screen Awards | Best Performance by an Actress in a Supporting Role, (Drama, Musical or Comedy) | Nominated | |
| 2013 | Maalaala Mo Kaya: Relo | Gawad Tanglaw Awards | Best Performance by an Actress | Won | |
| 2013 | Promil Pre-school: I-Shine Talent Camp | PMPC Star Awards for Television | Best Talent Search Program Host | Nominated | |
| 2014 | Promil Pre-school: I-Shine Talent Camp | PMPC Star Awards for Television | Best Talent Search Program Host | Nominated | |
| 2016 | The Unmarried Wife | FAMAS Awards | Best Supporting Actress | Nominated | |
| 2017 | The Greatest Love | 7th EdukCircle Awards | Best Supporting Actress in a TV Series | Won | |
| 2017 | The Greatest Love | PMPC Star Awards for Television | Best Drama Supporting Actress | Nominated | |
| 2018 | Deadma Walking | Metro Manila Film Festival | Best Supporting Actress | Nominated | |
| 2018 | Deadma Walking | PMPC Star Awards for Movies | Movie Supporting Actress of the Year | Nominated | |
| 2019 | Kadenang Ginto | PMPC Star Awards for Television | Best Drama Actress | Nominated | |
| 2019 | Kadenang Ginto | Asian Academy Creatives Award | National Winner, Philippines: Best Actress in a Supporting Role | Won | |
| 2019 | Kadenang Ginto | Asian Academy Creatives Award | Best Actress in a Supporting Role | Nominated | |
