= Carlos Agassi =

Filipino actor, model and singer (born 1979)

- Born: Amir Carlos Damaso Vahidi Agassi; December 12, 1979 (age 46); Alaminos, Pangasinan, Philippines
- Years active: 1996–present
- Agents: Star Magic (1996–2014); Sparkle GMA Artist Center (2014–present)
- Spouse: Sarina Yamamoto

Amir Carlos Agassi (born December 12, 1979), popularly known as Carlos Agassi and simply Amir, is a Filipino actor, host, recording artist, and model. He was launched as a member of ABS-CBN's Star Circle (now Star Magic) Batch 3 in 1998.

== Career ==
Agassi is a member of ABS-CBN's circle of homegrown talents named Star Magic. He was part of a male group dubbed as "The Hunks" together with Piolo Pascual, Jericho Rosales, Diether Ocampo, and Bernard Palanca. During his tenure as part of the Hunks, he has been a primetime actor when he co-starred with Claudine Barretto in the hit teleserye Sa Dulo ng Walang Hanggan which ran from 2001 to 2003.

Aside from acting, he had hosting stints in the variety show ASAP and also hosted a hidden camera practical joke television series entitled Victim, patterned on America's Punk'd.

After an almost two-year hiatus from acting, Agassi returned on television via ABS-CBN's Agua Bendita in 2010 where he played as one of the primary antagonists.

In 2014, Agassi appeared in GMA Network's Elemento.

== Other ventures ==
Agassi went on hiatus from showbiz sometime in the mid-2000s to finish his degree in psychology at De La Salle University. He also ventured into the restaurant business and opened Brasas, a Latin-American inspired restaurant in Metro Manila. Agassi also has his own recording studio called Amir Carlos Agassi, Inc. where he releases his rap music and collaborates with other artists.

== Personal life ==
Agassi was born to an Iranian father and a Filipino mother, Rowena Damaso, and spent part of his childhood in Iran and Bahrain. He was also given the Arab name Amir. After he and his mother experienced abuse from his father, his mother remarried to an Arab national, Fahad Al-Hanaki. Agassi identifies as a Roman Catholic. Agassi's younger brother Michael is also an actor and was married to actress Cherry Lou. His other brother Aaron is both an actor and singer.

Agassi was previously engaged to model and Pinoy Big Brother housemate Margo Midwinter. The couple called off the engagement in 2013. Agassi was also in a relationship with actress Gwen Garci. In 2025, Agassi married his non-showbiz partner Sarina Yamamoto.

== Filmography ==
=== Film ===
| Year | Title | Role | Notes | Source |
|---|---|---|---|---|
| 1996 | Ang TV: The Adarna Adventure | | | |
| 1997 | Ibulong Mo sa Diyos 2 | | | |
| 1998 | Mystrio (Uno...dos...tres pilyos!) | Caloy | | |
| 1998 | Hiling | | | |
| 1998 | Muling Ibalik ang Tamis ng Pag-ibig | | | |
| 1999 | Tar-San | Scottie | | |
| 2002 | Dekada '70 | Gani | | |
| 2003 | Pinay Pie | SPO Pablito | | |
| 2006 | Oh, My Ghost! | Jeff | | |
| 2007 | Enteng Kabisote 4: Okay Ka, Fairy Ko: The Beginning of the Legend | Nardong Yakitiyak | | |
| 2010 | My Amnesia Girl | Ken | | |
| 2011 | The Unkabogable Praybeyt Benjamin | Paul Marigma | | |
| 2012 | Moron 5 and the Crying Lady | Alvin Cabalda | | |
| 2012 | Every Breath U Take | Ace | | |
| 2014 | Moron 5.2: The Transformation | Abdul Do-Remi | | |

=== Television ===
| Year | Title | Role | Notes | Source |
|---|---|---|---|---|
| 1996 | Eezy Dancing | Himself / Host | | |
| 1996–2006 | ASAP | Himself / Host / Performer | | |
| 1996–1998 | Gimik | Marco Trinidad | | |
| 1996 | Maalaala Mo Kaya | | Episode: "Basketball" | |
| 1997 | Star Drama Theater Presents: Angelika | | Episode: "Honey My Love" | |
| 1998–2000 | Cyberkada | Himself | | |
| 2000–2001 | Saan Ka Man Naroroon | Richard Rivera | | |
| 2001–2003 | Sa Dulo ng Walang Hanggan | Benjamin "Benjie" Ilagan / Benedicto | | |
| 2003 | Masayang Tanghali Bayan | Himself / Host | | |
| 2003 | Buttercup | Pippo | | |
| 2003 | Victim | Himself / Host | | |
| 2005 | Bora: Sons of the Beach | Caloy | | |
| 2005 | Kaya Mo Ba 'To? | Himself / Host | | |
| 2006 | Star Magic Presents: Ang Lovey Kong All Around | Max | | |
| 2006 | Ang Panday | Jaffir | | |
| 2007 | Princess Sarah | Philip Burrow | | |
| 2007 | Rounin | Sephdo | | |
| 2007 | Palimos ng Pag-ibig | Dick | | |
| 2008 | Dragonna | Rafael | | |
| 2010 | Agua Bendita | Baldo Barrameda | | |
| 2010 | Wansapanataym | Epoy | Episode: "Ali Badbad en da Madyik Banig" | |
| 2010 | Imortal | Vergara | | |
| 2011 | Wansapanataym | Billy's Dad | Episode: "A Boy's Bestfriend" | |
| 2011 | Ikaw ay Pag-Ibig | Mr. Dizon | | |
| 2012 | Wako Wako | Tommy Nograles | | |
| 2012 | Wansapanataym | Jeff | Episode: "Perfect Gift" | |
| 2013 | Swak na Swak | Himself / Co-host | | |
| 2015 | Imbestigador | Anacleto "Dongoy / Nono" Brezuela | Episode: "Robin Jacques Ong Rape-Slay Case" | |
| 2015 | Elemento Presents: Pandora, Ang Diwata ng Wawa | James | | |
| 2015 | Mac and Chiz | Dodong | Episode: "Buwang for All" | |
| 2015 | Juan Tamad | Senator Iñigo Imperial | | |
| 2015 | Karelasyon | Ronald | Episode: "Unhappy Wife" | |
| 2016 | Carlo J. Caparas' Ang Panday | Ador | | |
| 2016 | Karelasyon | Nestor | Episode: "Ex" | |
| 2016 | Dear Uge | Ken Mariano | Episode: "Faking Girls" | |
| 2017 | Karelasyon | Dick | Episode: "Perfect Woman" | |
| 2017 | Wish Ko Lang | Estong | Episode: "Matador" | |
| 2018 | Tadhana | Marlon | Episode: "Secret Affair" | |
| 2018 | Victor Magtanggol | Arvin Espiritu | | |
| 2019 | Imbestigador | Pepito Tagal | Episode: "Bata Sa Tulay" | |
| 2019 | Beautiful Justice | Adam Balagtas | | |
| 2020 | Bilangin ang Bituin sa Langit | Ringo | | |
| 2021 | Imbestigador | Jonel Nuezca | Episode: "Gregorio Double Murder Case" | |
| 2023–2024 | Black Rider | Vice Mayor Echavez | | |
| 2026 | A Secret in Prague | Jethro "Jepoy" Salamangkero / Cocoy | | |

== Discography ==
=== Studio albums ===
| Year | Album |
|---|---|
| 2000 | The Amir of Rap: Released: Label: Star Records; Format: CD, cassette |
| 2003 | C.A.R.L.O.S. (Can Agassi Rap Like Old School?): Released: Label: Star Records; Format: CD, cassette |
| 2005 | AMIR: Released: Label: Star Records; Format: CD, cassette |
