= Noah (TV series) =

- Title card
- Genre: Action; Fantasy; Adventure; Drama; Police procedural
- Created by: ABS-CBN Studios
- Written by: Philip King; Dindo Perez; Shugo Praico
- Directed by: Malu L. Sevilla; Lino S. Cayetano
- Starring: Piolo Pascual; Zaijian Jaranilla
- Theme music composer: Ogie Alcasid
- Opening theme: "Kahit Na Malayo Ka" by Piolo Pascual
- Country of origin: Philippines
- Original language: Tagalog
- No. of episodes: 149 (list of episodes)

Production
- Executive producers: Charo Santos-Concio; Cory Vidanes; Laurenti M. Dyogi; Roldeo T. Endrinal; Emilio Paul Siojo
- Production locations: Metro Manila, Philippines; Taytay, Rizal; Santa Rosa, Laguna; Subic, Zambales; Morong, Bataan
- Running time: 30-45 minutes
- Production company: Dreamscape Entertainment

Original release
- Network: ABS-CBN
- Release: July 12, 2010 – February 4, 2011

Related
- May Bukas Pa; Ikaw ay Pag-Ibig; FPJ's Ang Probinsyano

Noah is a Philippine television drama fantasy series broadcast by ABS-CBN. Directed by Malu L. Sevilla and Lino S. Cayetano, it stars Piolo Pascual and Zaijian Jaranilla. It aired on the network's Primetime Bida line up and worldwide on TFC from July 12, 2010, to February 4, 2011, replacing Kung Tayo'y Magkakalayo in Agua Bendita's timeslot and was replaced by Mutya.

== Overview ==
The series was announced in December 2009, during the time when May Bukas Pa (where Zaijian Jaranilla currently portrays upon the series' announcement) is still in production and one year after the announcement of the said religious series on late 2008. Originally announced as a movie, later announcements turned it into a series. Piolo Pascual appeared on the 263rd and finale episode of May Bukas Pa on February 5, 2010, further teasing the series. It was launched as part of the half-term show line-up by ABS-CBN as part of the 60th Anniversary of Philippine Soap Opera, and presented as the network's station ID for the rainy season in the Philippines. The show's trailer was released and its website was launched in June 2010. Taping or principal photography of the series was done from June 2010 to February 4, 2011. Overall, production process of the series which included its announcement spanned for 1 year and 2 months.

Due to weather problems caused by the typhoon Basyang, the first week episodes of the series was replayed as a marathon on July 17, 2010.

The show has similarities with Walt Disney Pictures' Tarzan due to some scenes taking place on a forest.

Year	Episodes	No. of episodes	No. of episodes (overall)	First aired	Last aired	First aired (overall)	Last aired (overall)
2010	1–82	82	124	July 12, 2010	November 3, 2010	July 12, 2010	December 31, 2010
2010	83–109	27	124	November 4, 2010	December 10, 2010	July 12, 2010	December 31, 2010
2010	110–124	15	124	December 13, 2010	December 31, 2010	July 12, 2010	December 31, 2010
2011	125–127	3	25	January 3, 2011	January 5, 2011	January 3, 2011	February 4, 2011
2011	128–139	10	25	January 6, 2011	January 21, 2011	January 3, 2011	February 4, 2011
2011	140–149	10	25	January 24, 2011	February 4, 2011	January 3, 2011	February 4, 2011

== Synopsis ==
Gabriel (Piolo Pascual) lost his 2-year-old son, Jacob (Zaijian Jaranilla) in an accident brought by his job as a police officer. It also placed him in a coma for 5 years. Upon awakening, He went back to service and started searching for his son, whom he knew in his gut was still alive.

Jacob drifted to a mysterious Island of Noah, where a group of old looking apes called Unta dwell. They took care of Jacob and renamed him Eli. There Gabriel searches for his son and comes across him but now his son finds him part of the Unta tribe. He was unable to convince Eli that he is in fact his son, Gabriel joins him in his quest and bonds them together. But little did Gabriel knew that his son's quest is actually his own and that what ever will be the outcome of this quest will determine the fate of the outside world.

== Plot ==
As a child, he wanted to be a policeman to put his own father in jail not just for the crimes he has committed, but also for hurting his mother. He meets Ruth (Jodi Sta. Maria), a beautiful woman who he later has a son with. They get married without Ruth's mother's blessing. But sometimes, fate has a way of playing with people's lives. One of the criminals Gabriel busted years ago manages to escape the prison. As revenge, the criminal goes after Gabriel's most precious thing: his family. Now, Gabriel finds himself fighting for his life and that of his wife and son. After five years of suffering from amnesia, Gabriel recalls everything but it is too late. His wife is already married to his former suitor. He realizes that she does not intend to return to him. Ironically he regains his memory only to find out that he has already lost everything he once cared for. Then he decides to look for his son. He strongly believes that he is still alive. And he is right. For his son now lives with the Ungtas in the island of Noah: a world completely different, unknown to man.

However, Ruth is also just pretending that she'd forgotten the tragedy that took her son away and changed their lives. She still resents Gabriel for allowing his job to put their family in danger. Meanwhile, Eli welcomes his 7th birthday with disappointment as he wakes up without the tail he had anticipated throughout his whole childhood. With sadness in Eli's eyes, Adah can't find the strength to tell him the truth for she knows it will bring him more pain. But then, Eli finds something in the forest that gives him an explanation on who he really is: a toy soldier. He trains day and night to regain his strength. Not long after, Gabriel finds himself in a police station again... as a police officer. This way, it will be easier for him to find his son Jacob. Meanwhile, Eli continues to seek the creatures that look like him. He asks around trying to gather information and follows a colorful bird that flies around Noah hoping to get a lead. Eli fails to reach the riverbank leading to the sea where he believes he can find others that look like him. So, together with his best friend Lotlot, he escapes on that night to follow the bird. He has no idea of the danger that's about to come his way for his Uncle Caleb releases the buwa-buwas to sabotage his brother's reign.

Towards the end of the show, Gabriel shoots Judah, although before Judah dies, he shoots Gabriel and Gabriel slowly dies. Before he dies, he puts all of Isla Noah and the world back to normal. After, Gabriel dies, although, the Diwata lets him go back to life and Gabriel and Ruth are happily married again.

== Cast and characters ==
=== Main cast ===
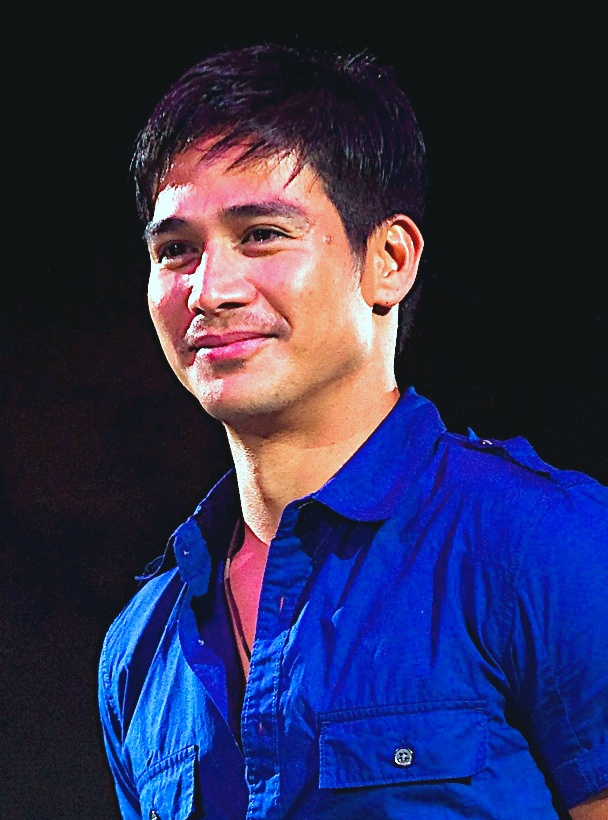
Piolo Pascual portrays Gabriel Perez.

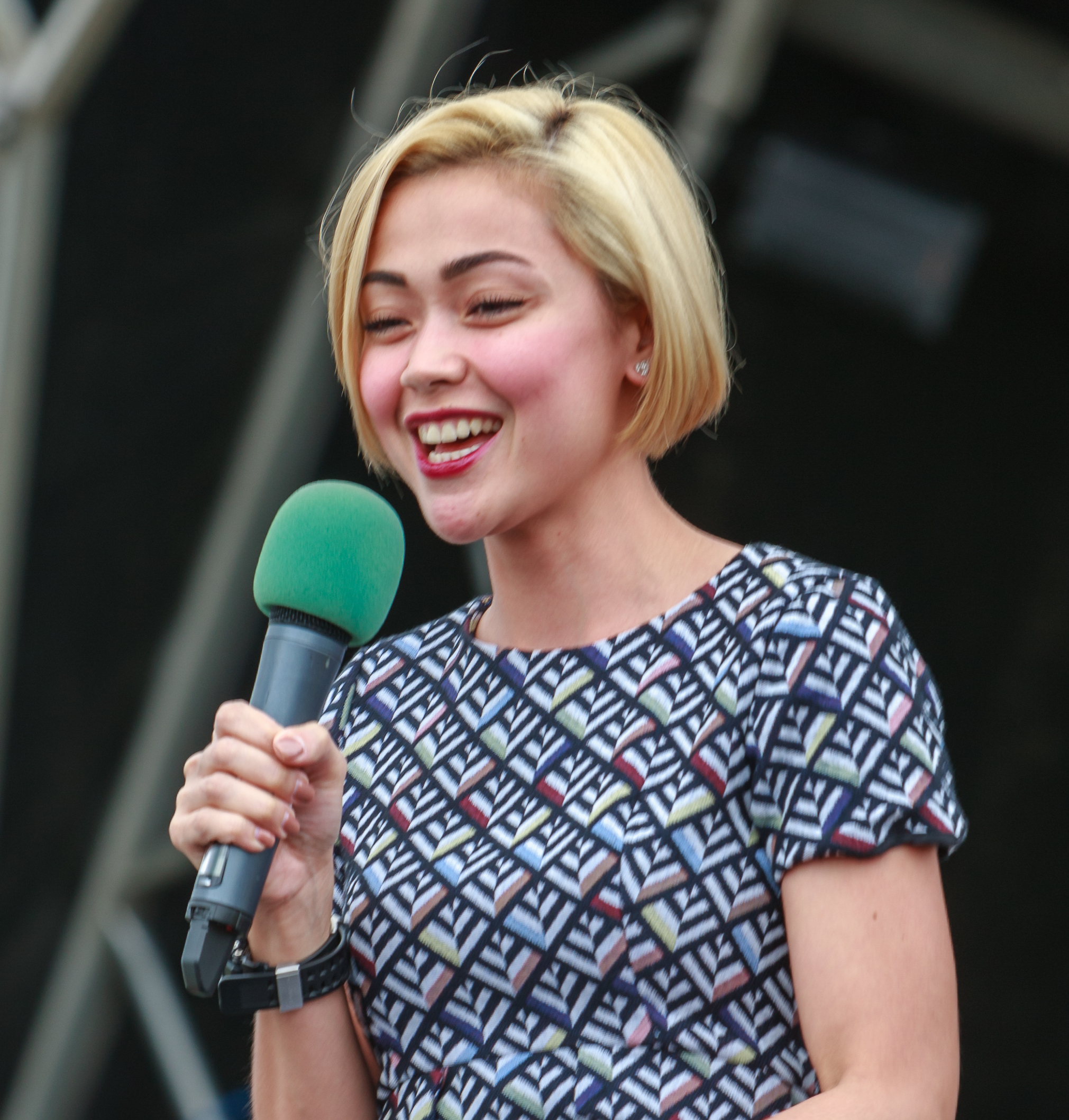
Jodi Sta. Maria portrays Ruth de Leon-Perez.

Cast	Character	Summary
Piolo Pascual	Gabriel Perez	A tough and good policeman who is the father of Jacob Perez/Eli. Because of his intense love for his son, Gabriel went on an unending quest to find him and bring him back.
Zaijian Jaranilla	Jacob Perez / Eli	Son of Gabriel Perez, he is one of the ungtas (tribe of monkey-like humanoids). When he was two years old, an accident separated him from his parents and landed him on the island of Noah. He must prove himself to them, but this begins to be difficult as Gabriel and other humans invade Noah.

=== Supporting cast ===
Cast	Character	Summary
Jodi Sta. Maria	Ruth De Leon-Perez	Eli/Jacob's mother. She left Gabriel two years after the accident. She couldn't bear the pain that he husband has caused her and to continue on and not loose much of her life. She began a new life with Judah. She and Jacob experienced mistreatment and resentment from Judah.
Kristine Hermosa	Diwatang Eva	The beautiful diwata or the forest deity of Noah. She protects the island using her magic along with her small lambana fairies. She tries to help Eli and Gabriel in their journey, but in doing so, could fulfill a prophesy that is dangerous for her. Later in the series she will leave the island along with her lambana emissaries to help Eli and Gabriel. She will assume the guise of a mortal.
Jolo Revilla	Levi Aragon	Gabriel's police partner, son of one of the most decorated police officers in the country. He wants to do his family proud that is why when he was assigned to Gabriel he took every opportunity to learn from him. But when he sets his sights to Naomi, that is when problem occurs.
Xyriel Manabat	Veronica "Nica" Avila	
Melissa Ricks	Naomi Mondragon	Judah's sister, she takes care of their zoo business and falls for Levi, but she has a mean streak about her which Levi love.
Cherry Pie Picache	Rebecca De Leon	The mother of Ruth and a social climber. She will do anything to get rich, even trying to wed her daughter to someone with money. For her having money will solve all her problems in life, and she will have it no matter what.
Tessie Tomas	Sarah Perez	Gabriel's mother and Jacob's grandmother. She never gives up for his son, a trait she taught Gabriel.
Joem Bascon	Judah Mondragon	Ruth's husband and Joshua's father. He took care of her after the accident she met with her then live in partner, Gabriel. He is a wealthy businessman and a ruthless hunter. He has secrets that if revealed will shatter the foundation of her relationship with Ruth. He actually mistreats Jacob and Ruth, and subsequently Rebecca.
Baron Geisler	Caleb	Gideon's brother who wants only one thing to be the tribe's leader. Gideon is selfish as he is arrogant, he will stop at nothing to gain power, but in truth he does not have the skills to handle all the power he wants.
Ana Capri	Adah	Gideon's wife and mother to Eli, she and Gideon did not have a child of their own, that is why when Eli came to them, they regarded him as one of their own, raising him and loving him as if he came from them.
Nonie Buencamino	Gideon	Leader of the Ungtas, father of Eli. He is the greatest leader the tribe has ever known, everybody respects him and Eli looks up to him so much, but his world will clash as Gabriel goes to Noah in search for his own son.
Renzo Cruz	Maisha Rodriguez	Caleb's second in command, he is more greedy than his master. A monster waiting to be unleashed.
Lou Veloso	Tatang Zatok	The Imam of the tribe. He is the most knowledgeable about the island.

=== Recurring cast ===
Cast	Character	Summary
Ina Feleo	Tessa Avila	Nica's mother who distrusts Jacob for her daughter.
Miguelito De Guzman	Joshua Mondragon	Judah's son and Jacob's stepbrother.
Daniel Fernando	Arturo "Toro" Mamaril	
Frank G. Rivera	Supt. Cayatano	
Jon Achaval	Supt. San Jose	
Francis Magundayao	Teen Gabriel Perez	

=== Guest cast ===
- Eric Fructuoso as Jose Isaac Perez
- Smokey Manaloto as Badong Belmonte
- Neil Ryan Sese as Ramon
- Spanky Manikan as Ernie
- Tony Manalo as Supt. Salvador
- Cathy Remperas as Lambana
- Mariel Sorino as one of the small fairies or Lambana assisting diwata Eva
- Yuri Okawa as a Lambana of Diwata Eva who teases Eva constantly about the diwata gazing upon the "human"
- Carol Batay as Lambana
- John Paul Santos as Extra Unta
- Emily Loren as Inang Ria

== Promotion ==
This series has been developed by Mga Anghel Na Walang Langit, Princess Sarah, May Bukas Pa, Agua Bendita, and Momay, due its genre of child-oriented, fantasy and religious drama series that produced by Dreamscape Entertainment since 2005. It co-existed with Agua Bendita and Momay from July 12 to September 17, 2010, and was succeeded by Mutya.

== See also ==
- List of ABS-CBN Studios original drama series
- List of programs broadcast by ABS-CBN
