= Mara Clara (2010 TV series) =

2010–11 Philippine television drama series

- Title card
- Genre: Family drama
- Created by: ABS-CBN Studios
- Based on: Mara Clara by Emil Cruz Jr.
- Written by: Danica Mae Domingo; Ma. Regina Amigo; David Diuco; Allan Cuadra
- Directed by: Jerome C. Pobocan; Claudio "Tots" Sanchez-Mariscal IV
- Starring: Kathryn Bernardo; Julia Montes
- Theme music composer: Nonong Buencamino Jr.
- Opening theme: "Mara Clara" by Carol Banawa
- Composers: Idonnah C. Villarico; Rommel Villarico
- Country of origin: Philippines
- Original language: Tagalog (Filipino)
- No. of seasons: 2
- No. of episodes: 158 (list of episodes)

Production
- Executive producers: Roldeo T. Endrinal; Jennifer Borja-Soliman
- Editors: Marion Bautista; Marianne Fernando
- Running time: 30–35 minutes
- Production company: Dreamscape Entertainment Television

Original release
- Network: ABS-CBN
- Release: October 25, 2010 – June 3, 2011

Related
- Mara Clara (1992–1997) (Philippines)

Mara Clara is a Philippine television drama series broadcast by ABS-CBN. The series is a remake of the 1992 Philippine television series of the same title. Directed by Jerome C. Pobocan and Claudio "Tots" Sanchez-Mariscal IV, it stars Kathryn Bernardo and Julia Montes. It aired on the network's Primetime Bida line up and worldwide on TFC from October 25, 2010, to June 3, 2011, replacing 1DOL and was replaced by Guns and Roses.

The title is derived from María Clara, the mestiza heroine in Noli Me Tángere, a novel written by José Rizal.

Mara Clara was the highest-rated program on the network's primetime block for the period of February 3, 2011 until Walang Hanggan on October 26, 2012 according to Kantar Media Philippines. The series is streaming online on YouTube.

== Series overview ==
=== Adaptation ===
Mara Clara was a remake of the 1992 television series, Mara Clara an adapted novel and serial of Emil Cruz Jr. produced by ABS-CBN Studios. In 1996, the original TV series was adapted into a film which nearly the whole cast reprised their roles. In August 2010, ABS-CBN announced that they had decided to remake the television series with Kathryn Bernardo slated for the role of Mara opposite Julia Montes as Clara which centers on two children who were both born on the same day and were switched by Clara's biological uncle, Karlo (Ping Medina). Mara grew up poor while Clara grew up in a rich family as a spoiled girl. However, it was noted that Karlo was only following his brother Gary's (Jhong Hilario) order until both girls were returned to the people they belonged to. The series premiered on October 25, 2010, and continued to air until June 3, 2011.

=== Episodes ===
Year	Episode numbers	Episodes	First aired	Last aired
2010	1–50	50	October 25, 2010	December 31, 2010
2011	51–158	108	January 3, 2011	June 3, 2011

== Cast ==
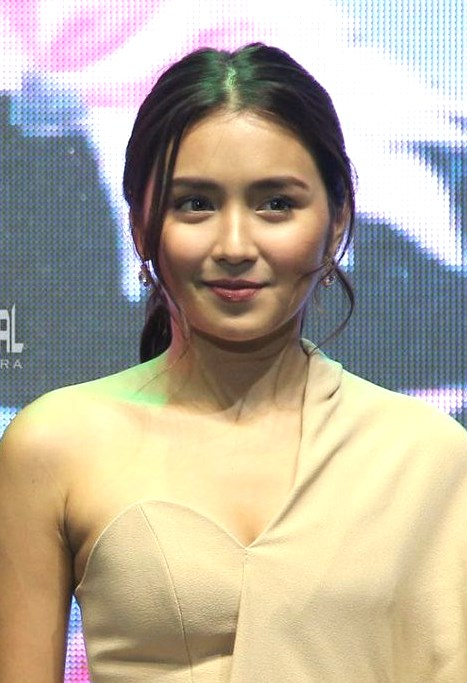
Kathryn Bernardo portrays Mara David / Mara Del Valle originally by Judy Ann Santos

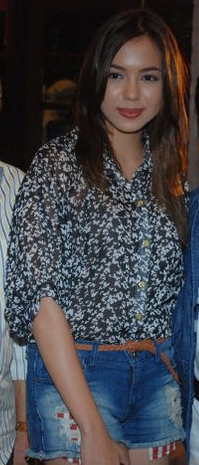
Julia Montes portrays Clara Del Valle / Clara David originally by Gladys Reyes

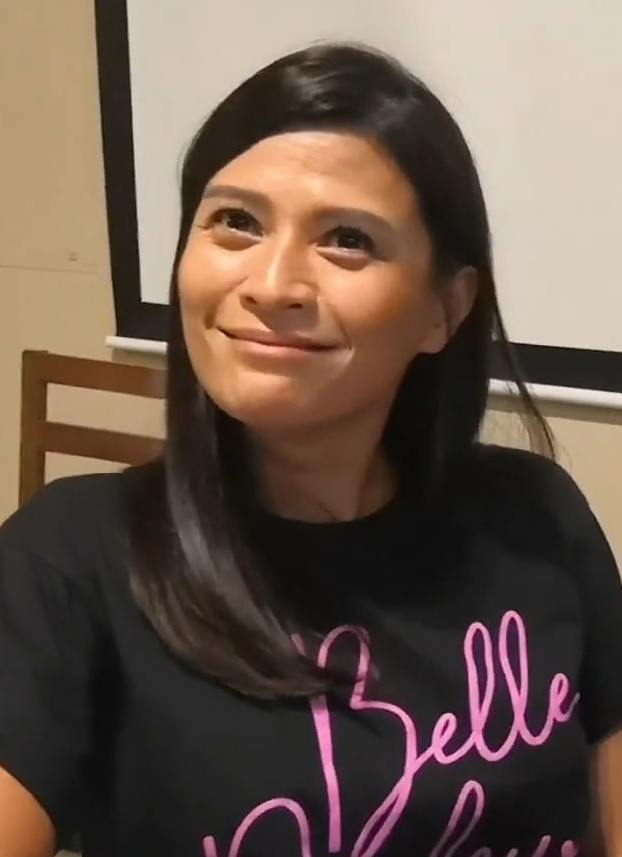
Mylene Dizon portrays Susan David originally by Susan Africa

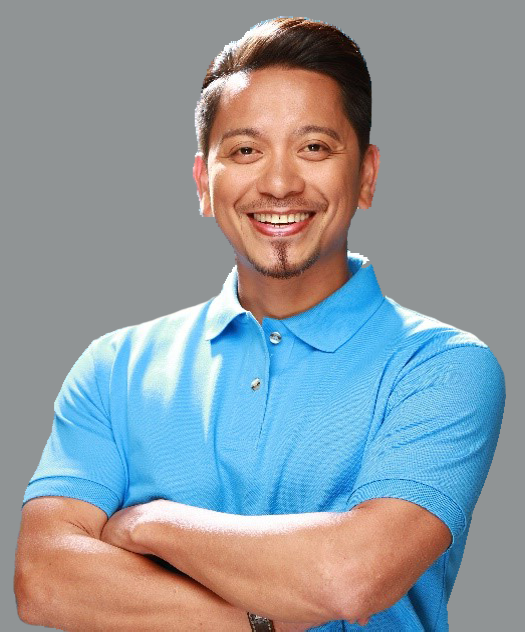
Jhong Hilaro portrays Gary David originally by the late Eruel Tongco in the TV version and William Martinez in the movie version.

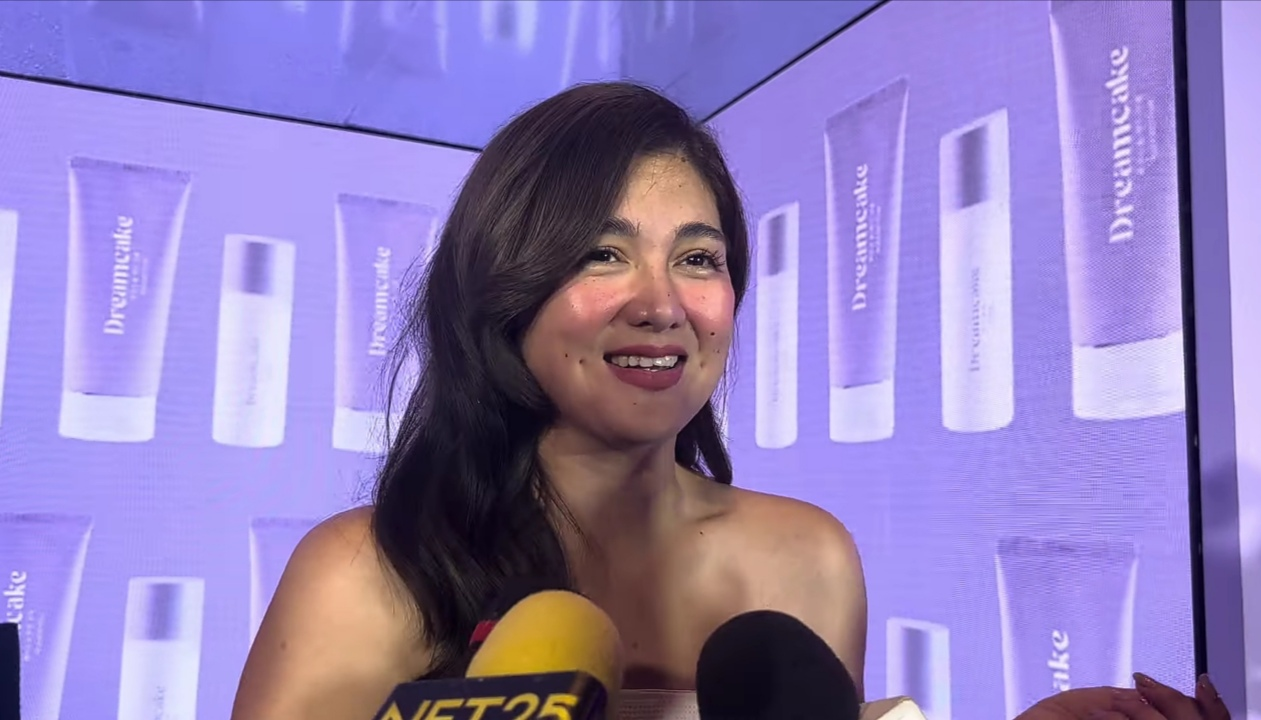
Dimples Romana portrays Alvira Del Valle originally by Beverly Vergel.

=== Protagonist ===
- Kathryn Bernardo as Mara E. David (de facto) / Mara C. Del Valle (de jure) – Mara is the main protagonist. She is the loving and hardworking daughter of Gary and Susan David who will do anything to support her family's needs. Her biological parents are Amanthe and Alvira Del Valle. Her life became miserable when Clara enters the picture to oppose. Despite, all of these misfortunes, she still holds on her faith in God and believes that the sun will shine again for her. She was kidnapped, but survived from being killed by Gary.

=== Antagonist ===
- Julia Montes as Clara C. Del Valle (de facto) / Clara E. David (de jure) – She is the beautiful and intelligent, but bratty daughter of Amanthe and Alvira Del Valle, a wealthy couple. Her biological parents are Gary and Susan and her friends resent Mara for her social status. She is head-over-heels in love with her childhood best friend Christian. In the end, she saves Mara. But she was shot by Gary after saving Susan. She was sent to the mental institution due to trauma, but she discharged a year later.

=== Main cast ===
- Mylene Dizon as Susan Estacio-David – Clara’s biological mother and Mara’s foster mother. She experiences resentment from Gary and his mother Lupe for not being well-off like Alvira.
- Jhong Hilario as Gary David† (not to be confused with the basketball player of the same name) – Alvira's ex-boyfriend and Lupe's older son. Later, it is revealed that he is not the latter's father, and is the biological father of Clara. This is because of his own plans where his brother Karlo had switched the girls at birth. He kidnapped Mara and tried to kill the latter. In the end, he died after Susan impaled him.
- Dimples Romana as Alvira Castillo-Del Valle – Clara's foster mother and Mara's biological mother. She has always felt the need to spoil Clara throughout her life despite her husband's objections. This went as far as hurting Mara in Clara's defense, before and even after knowing the identities of the girls.
- Bobby Andrews as Amanthe Del Valle – Clara's foster father and Mara's biological father. He does not approve of Clara's mean-spirited personality, caused by her spoiled attitude from childhood; thus, he feels distant to her as a foster father. Later revealed to have a mistress in his own company.
- Albie Casiño as Christian "Otoy" Torralba – Clara's childhood friend, and eventually Mara's boyfriend. Despite their rough first meeting and impressions, he becomes determined to earn Mara's friendship and trust.
- John Manalo as Erris Reyes – Christian's best friend. At first, he prioritizes working over his studies, but eventually enrolls in the same private school as Christian, Clara, and Mara.

=== Supporting cast ===
- Gina Pareño as Lupe David – Gary and Karlo's mother, Susan's mother-in-law Mara's grandmother and Clara's biological grandmother who knows nothing but money. She mistreats Susan, and subsequently Mara, for her lower-class background, and favors Alvira. She becomes nicer and changes her ways after realizing Mara's kind nature, and learning of her older son's toxic actions and behavior.
- Ping Medina as Karlo David† – Gary's younger brother, Lupe's youngest son, Susan's brother-in-law, and Mara's uncle. He is responsible for switching Mara and Clara at birth. He remains caring for Mara despite his crime against both her and Clara. He dies before the truth is revealed to everyone aside from his brother and Clara, but his diary documenting the incident is recovered by Susan.
- Desiree del Valle as Christina Borres† – Employee in Amanthe's company. She is revealed to be his mistress and was killed by Gary before she tried to look for Amanthe.
- Diego Loyzaga as Derrick Gonzales – Mara's second love interest, who was adopted by Mayor Nathaniel Gonzales after his biological father is imprisoned and Carlotta's adoptive brother.

=== Recurring cast ===
- Chokoleit† as CG – Susan's friend and Mara (and Clara)'s godparent.
- Tiya Pusit† as Yaya Vonnel – Clara (and Mara)'s nanny. She has taken care of Clara throughout the latter's childhood while the parents have been busy with their businesses. Her name is a pun on April Boy Regino's song "Ye Ye Vonnel".
- Jamilla Obispo as Lenita Santos† – Gary's evil mistress who supports his crimes. She died after saving Mara from a bomb explosion.
- Paolo Serrano as Fidel – Gary's friend
- Dido dela Paz as Abdul Dominador† / Lover Boy† – Owner of the casino who mistreats Lenita. He died after getting shot by Lenita.
- Cherry Lou as Vanessa Torralba – Christian's mother who does not like Mara and favors Clara.
- Jan Marini Alano as Virginia/Barang
- Richard Quan as Nanding
- Kiray Celis as Desiree Francisco – She is Clara's evil partner in crime, who also hates Mara and her friends due to Mara being raised poor. Together with Clara they make Mara's life miserable as hell.
- EJ Jallorina as Butch Mauricio – Mara's friend.
- Aria Clemente as Christina "Jin Jin" Angeles – Mara's friend.
- Vangie Martelle as Abby – Clara's friend.
- Arie Reyes as Kaye – Clara's friend.
- Phytos Ramirez as Miguel "Migs" Soriano – Christian's basketball teammate.
- Solo Kiggins as Anthony Mercado – Christian's basketball teammate.
- Marion Gopez as Mickey Torres – Christian's basketball teammate.
- Renzo Cruz as Mayor Nathaniel Gonzales† – Carlotta's biological father and Derrick's adoptive father who died after getting killed by one of Gary's henchmen.
- Helga Krapf as Carlotta Gonzales
- Francis Magundayao as young Gary
- Izzy Canillo as young Karlo
- Andre Tiangco as Atty. Barrameda

=== Special appearances ===
- Kimberly Fulgar as young Mara David
- Christine Joy de Guzman as young Clara De Valle
- Fredmoore delos Santos as Crispin

=== Cameo ===
- Arron Villaflor
- Robi Domingo
- Enrique Gil
- Jake Cuenca
- Jason Abalos
- Ejay Falcon
- Enchong Dee
- Joseph Marco
- Joem Bascon
- Martin del Rosario
- Matteo Guidicelli
- Sam Concepcion
- Sam Milby
- Xian Lim
- Zaijian Jaranilla

== Difference between original and remake ==
Original	Remake
Susan gave birth to twins: Clara and another baby who died in Kardo's hands. This deceased twin was mistakenly believed to be Mara.	Susan has three children: Clara and twins born near the end of the series.
Gary's last name is Davis. The Del Valle couple are named Amante and Almira, and Kardo is Gary's cousin. Enrico David / Henry Villafuerte is Almira's adoptive brother.	Gary's last name is David. The Del Valle couple are named Amanthe and Alvira, and Karlo is Gary's brother.
Almira was compelled to fall in love with Gary.	Alvira and Gary were lovers, but their relationship ended when she went to the United States.
Mara learns that Gary was imprisoned after his release.	Mara was aware of Gary's imprisonment during his incarceration.
Amante tried to court Susan, but the latter rejected him.	Amante did not try to court Susan. Susan and Alvira were previously best friends.
Gary and Kardo are cousins. Gary has two siblings: Louie, his half-sister and Roy, his brother.	Gary and Karlo are brothers, the only sons of Lupe David.
Gary's mother, Ramona, is mentioned in the series but does not make an appearance. It is later revealed that Ramona and Gary's father are confined in the mental hospital.	Lupe is Gary and Karlo's mother.
Kardo is alive throughout the series.	Karlo was killed mid-series.
Susan's friends, CG and Lagring, are both Mara's godmothers. CG, who mysteriously vanished, later returned to the series.	CG, Susan's friend and Mara's godmother, was included in the series. The equivalent of Lagring's character is Lupe, who became close with Susan later on in the series.
Mara and Clara went to different high schools.	Mara and Clara went to the same high school.
Erris and Jepoy are the adopted sons of the Del Valle family.	Erris was Mara and Clara's classmate. Jepoy's character was not included in the series.
Carol, Clara's closest friend and roommate during her time at the Del Valles' residence, became an accomplice in Clara's schemes, as did Lester.	Desiree was Clara's sole accomplice.
Karen, Jepoy, Erris, and Denise are part of Mara's circle of friends.	Butch and Jin Jin are part of Mara's circle of friends.
Enrico, Almira's cunning adopted brother, emerged as one of the series' final antagonists along with Clara. He later changed his name to Henry Villafuerte.	Enrico's character was omitted from the series, leaving Gary as the sole antagonist.
Gary's character was written out of the series following the untimely passing of actor Eruel Tongco in a car accident.	Gary meets his demise at the end of the series.
Mara and Clara first met at the Davis household.	Mara and Clara first met at school.
Lola Binay, Querubin, and Dado work as helpers for the Del Valles.	Yaya Vonnel is the Del Valle household's nanny.
Amante and Almira are philanthropists and run a car dealership company and a printing house.	Amanthe and Alvira run a realty company.
Susan loses her sanity due to her miscarriage and the revelation of Gary's wrongdoings, including his affair with Lenita.	This storyline was not included.
Amante is aware that Clara is not his daughter. He had believed his biological daughter had died during Almira's childbirth.	Amanthe, along with Alvira, discovers that Clara is not their biological daughter after taking a DNA test following Clara's accident.
Clara discovers she is not Amante's biological daughter when she overhears a phone call between him and Gary. A year later, Gary reveals Mara's true identity to Clara.	Clara discovers the truth about her and Mara's identities through Karlo.
Clara's identity was kept a secret due to Almira's heart condition.	This storyline was not included.
Clara fully accepts Susan and Gary as her parents and resents Amante for keeping her away from them.	Clara struggles to accept her fate upon discovering that Susan and Gary are her biological parents.
Susan stabs Gary while protecting Mara, but he survives the attack with only a wound.	In the series finale, Susan stabs Gary to death in a bid to protect Alvira.
After being beaten by Gary and his henchmen, Kardo suffers amnesia from their attempt to kill him. Later, Susan experiences a similar fate as Kardo.	Mara feigned amnesia after being rescued from a kidnapping.
Lenita is actually Sylvia, Amante's ex-girlfriend, who was under the impression that his name was Raphael.	Lenita had an affair with Gary only.
Lenita had a son with Amante, who died. Later, she gives birth to Lester. She also becomes pregnant with Gary's child but experiences a miscarriage.	Lenita does not have a son.
Susan learns Mara and Clara's true identities through Kardo.	Susan discovers Mara and Clara's true identities after reading Karlo's diary.
Erris was believed to be Amante and Lenita's son.	Erris has no connection to Amanthe or Lenita.
Susan became a villain after Gary went missing, making Mara's life difficult as she suspected Amante was responsible for Gary's death.	Gary's disappearance was not part of the story, allowing Susan to remain a loving mother to Mara. Despite knowing Mara is not her biological daughter, Susan never turns into a villain.
Susan was paralyzed midway through the series.	Lupe was paralyzed after a stroke, from the middle to the end of the series.
Risa saved the diary from Kardo, who was about to burn it.	Susan accidentally found a piece of the burned diary in the trash can.
Clara's kidnapping was staged, while Mara was intentionally abducted by Gary.	Mara was kidnapped intentionally, while Clara was taken by Gary's henchmen by accident. The henchmen were caught while attempting to kidnap Mara.
Susan becomes pregnant halfway through the series, but later suffers a miscarriage.	Susan becomes pregnant towards the end of the series.
Clara returned to her real family's home, feeling blamed for the conflict between Amante and Almira, who were solely focused on Mara.	Clara resented being sent back to the Davids' home after the truth about her and Mara was revealed.
Mara learned she was not Susan and Gary's daughter before discovering she was a Del Valle.	Mara knew her and Clara's true identities simultaneously.
Amante and Almira argued after he found Gary's letters hidden in her cabinet.	Amanthe and Alvira argued after he discovered a bag containing a photo of her and Gary, mistakenly believing they had been on a date.
Erris has a crush on Mara.	Erris does not have a crush on Mara.
Christian first met Mara at school, and later met Clara at the Del Valles' home.	Christian met Clara first at school, then met Mara at a mall.
Jepoy is Erris' best friend.	Christian is Erris' best friend.
Almira learned Clara's true identity from Kardo, who had a copy of her supposed deceased daughter's death certificate. Later, when she saw Susan and Clara hugging, she realized their connection. Eventually, Almira uncovered the truth about Mara before Amante, after reading the diary and having a phone call with Kardo confirming the truth.	Alvira and Amante learned the true identities of Mara and Clara from Susan, who possessed Karlo's diary.
Mara was believed to be Gary's daughter from a previous relationship. Edna, who is not Mara's biological mother, raised her. Gary and Edna also have a daughter together. Later, Mara was also thought as a product of raping Almira done by Gary.	This storyline was not included.
Mara overheard Susan talking to herself and discovered her true identity, learning it before Amante and Almira. Kardo later confirmed it.	Susan, Alvira, Amanthe, and Gary are aware of Mara's true identity, with Amanthe and Alvira learning it first.
The diary was placed on top of the TV in a room in the Del Valle household, before the revelation.	The diary was sealed in plastic and placed inside a bag before the revelation.
Lenita planned to help Clara seek revenge on Mara after discovering that Mara is a Del Valle.	Lenita has a change of heart upon discovering that Mara is a Del Valle and ultimately saves her from a bomb planted by Gary.
Almira nearly died from a heart attack and fell into a coma upon discovering that Mara is her daughter.	This storyline was not included.
Derick is an intern doctor who saved Mara from a gunshot wound. His father is also a doctor.	Derrick, the adopted son of a mayor, assisted Mara and Susan in hiding from Gary on the island. He also saved Mara from drowning.
Lenita is alive throughout the series, but she chose to leave near the end of Book 1 because she does not want to be involved in Louie's plans to kill Mara.	Lenita died saving Mara from a bomb planted by Gary.
Louie kidnaps Mara, as he plans to kill the Del Valle family at the end of Book 1.	Gary kidnaps Mara as part of his plan to kill the Del Valle family at the end of the series.
Inggrid is Amante's secretary and mistress.	Christina is Amanthe's employee and mistress.
Inggrid is Henry's accomplice in destroying Amante's reputation.	Christina is Gary's accomplice in destroying Amanthe's reputation and company.
Derick has no siblings, but he has a girlfriend named Mitch.	Derrick has no girlfriend, but he has a sister named Carlotta.
Mara and Clara's 18th birthday parties were both held at the Del Valle family's mansion.	Mara's 16th birthday party was held in a garden, while Clara's was held in a basketball court.
Inggrid caused a scandal by performing a provocative song in front of Mara and Clara, the birthday celebrants, as well as their guests. She went further by kissing Amante in front of Almira, all as part of a calculated plan with Henry to destroy the Del Valle couple's marriage.	Clara sparked a scandal by crashing Mara's birthday celebration and disrupting the party.
To counter the accusation of theft, Clara revealed a set of pearls to Mara.	Although Clara did not reveal the pearls, Mara also was not wearing a pearl necklace.
Gary was killed by Henry.	Gary was killed by Susan.
Because Henry brainwashed her into believing Almira orchestrated her father's death, Clara sought revenge and experienced a partial loss of sanity.	Clara lost her sanity directly following her father's death, which was caused by Susan.
Almira was presumed dead after a car explosion.	Mara was presumed dead after a bomb exploded at an abandoned site.
Mara hid in another province at David and Mariel's house, where she works as their daughter's nanny to escape those who want to kill her.	Hiding from those who want to kill her, Mara stayed on another island with Susan. They were helped by Derrick and his father who is the island's mayor, at the resort owned by Derrick's foster father, where Mara worked as a tour guide and helper.

== Reception ==
KANTAR MEDIA NATIONAL HOUSEHOLD TV RATINGS (08:30PM PST)
PILOT EPISODE	FINALE EPISODE	PEAK	AVERAGE	SOURCE
27.3%	43.2%	??%	??%	

== International broadcast ==
Mara Clara had a successful run in Kenya, airing on NTV – one of the nation's top three television stations – during the 6pm to 7pm primetime slot. It aired in 2012 from April to June. Due to its success, reruns were broadcast on the later 10pm primetime slot later in the year.

== See also ==
- List of programs broadcast by ABS-CBN
- List of ABS-CBN Studios original drama series
