= 1DOL =

- Genre: Drama; Musical; Romance; Comedy
- Created by: ABS-CBN Studios
- Directed by: Ruel S. Bayani; Jojo A. Saguin
- Starring: Sarah Geronimo; Sam Milby; Coco Martin
- Opening theme: "You'll Always Be My Number One" by Sarah Geronimo
- Country of origin: Philippines
- Original language: Tagalog
- No. of episodes: 35 (list of episodes)

Production
- Executive producer: Laurenti M. Dyogi
- Producer: Myra-Afable Chavez
- Production location: Philippines
- Running time: 45 minutes
- Production companies: Dreamscape Entertainment; CCM Creatives

Original release
- Network: ABS-CBN
- Release: September 6 – October 22, 2010

Related
- Bituing Walang Ningning (2006); Pangarap na Bituin (2007); May Isang Pangarap (2013)

1DOL (stylized as iDOL) is a 2010 Philippine television drama series broadcast by ABS-CBN. Directed by Ruel S. Bayani and Jojo A. Saguin, it stars Sarah Geronimo, Sam Milby and Coco Martin. It aired on the network's Primetime Bida line up and worldwide on TFC from September 6 to October 22, 2010, replacing Agua Bendita and was replaced by Mara Clara.

== Series overview ==
Year	Episode numbers	Episodes	First aired	Last aired
2010	1–35	35	September 6, 2010	October 22, 2010

== Conception ==
1DOL was launched during the ABS-CBN Trade Event held August 24, 2010, at the World Trade Center Manila. It is also part of ABS-CBN's celebration for the 60th Year of Pinoy Soap Opera. On August 21 to September 4, 2010, ABS-CBN aired in its Saturday primetime block "The Making of 1DOL", a 30-minute special on how the series was conceptualized.

The series premiered on September 6, 2010, where the pilot episode was simulcast on three different television channels Studio 23, Cinema One and ABS-CBN.

== Synopsis ==
Belinda's on her way to becoming the next singing idol. When her parents Samson and Laura have incurred twenty million pesos worth of debt to a family friend, she was suddenly forced to leave her showbiz life behind. They have no choice but to run for their lives or else they would land in jail with no one to help them out. But in the process, Belinda not only loses her chance to make it big but she also walks away from Vince, her childhood friend whom she secretly loves. When her family moves to a remote province did Belinda meet Lando who instantly falls in love with her.

== Cast and characters ==
1DOL revolves not only in the main characters but a core group of supporters, led by Belinda "Billie/Jean" Suarez (Sarah Geronimo), Fernando "Lando" Lagdameo (Coco Martin) and Vincent "Vince" Serrano (Sam Milby). Lando and Vince have been secretly crushing on the same girl who has two different identities.

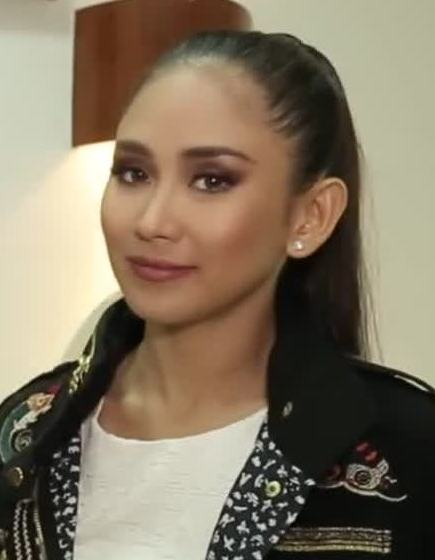
Sarah Geronimo portrays Belinda "Billie/Jean" Suarez.

Main cast

- Sarah Geronimo as Belinda "Billie/Jean" Suarez
- Sam Milby as Vincent "Vince" Serrano
- Coco Martin as Fernando "Lando" Lagdameo

Supporting cast

- Zsa Zsa Padilla as Eleanor Serrano
- Agot Isidro as Laura Suarez
- Rita Avila as Sandra Rosales
- Robert Seña as Ben Serrano
- Jessa Zaragoza as Magdalaena
- Malou de Guzman as Sharona Sulangan
- Neil Ryan Sese as Samson Suarez
- K Brosas as Antonia "Toyang" Timbales
- Tippy Dos Santos as Carol Serrano
- Emmanuelle Vera as Diana Rosales
- Marissa Sanchez as Lucy
- Thou Reyes as Buloy

== Music ==
In every episode of the show, musical numbers are performed by the cast.

=== Songs ===
Title	Version covered	Performed by	Episode	Ref.
"Ang Pag-ibig Kong Ito"	Leah Navarro	Billie Suarez	1. "Ang Simula"	
"I Need You Back"	Lea Salonga	Billie Suarez and Vince Serrano	2. "Sumabog na Pangarap"	
"Doon Lang"	Nonoy Zuñiga	Lando Lagdameo and Lagdameo Kids	3. "Kaibigan"	
"Nosi Balasi" / "Bad Romance"	Sampaguita / Lady Gaga	Eleanor Serrano and Sharona Silangan	3. "Kaibigan"	
"Ayt"	Sponge Cola feat. Gary Valenciano	Billie Suarez and One Harmony	3. "Kaibigan"	
"Maniwala Ka Sana"	Parokya ni Edgar	Vince Serrano and Da Vince Code Band	4. "Walang Iwanan"	
"Time In"	Yeng Constantino	Diana Rosales and One Harmony	4. "Walang Iwanan"	
"Nakapagtataka"	Rachel Alejandro	Billie Suarez	4. "Walang Iwanan"	
"Kumusta Ka"	Rey Valera	Lagdameo Kids	5. "Maliit ang Mundo"	
"Ikaw"	Sarah Geronimo	Lagdameo Kids	5. "Maliit ang Mundo"	
"Paano Kung Wala Ka Na"	Eva Eugenio	Laura Suarez	5. "Maliit ang Mundo"	
"Heto Na"	Apo Hiking Society	Da Vince Code Band	6. "Magkababata... Magkikita?"	
"Alipin"	Parokya ni Edgar	Da Vince Code Band	7. "Pangakong Pagsisisihan?"	
"Maniwala Ka Sana"	Parokya ni Edgar	Da Vince Code Band	7. "Pangakong Pagsisisihan?"	
"Doobidoo"	Apo Hiking Society	Da Vince Code Band	7. "Pangakong Pagsisisihan?"	
"Iingatan Ka"	Carol Banawa	Billie Suarez, Vince Serrano, Laura Suarez, Samson Suarez and Diana Rosales	7. "Pangakong Pagsisisihan?"	
"Kiliti"	D' Bodies	Lagdameo Kids	7. "Pangakong Pagsisisihan?"	
"Tulog Na"	Sugarfree	Billie Suarez	7. "Pangakong Pagsisisihan?"	

== See also ==
- List of programs broadcast by ABS-CBN
- List of ABS-CBN Studios original drama series
- Pinoy Idol
