= Agua Bendita =

- Title card
- Genre: Fantasy; Christian drama
- Created by: ABS-CBN Studios; Rod Santiago
- Developed by: ABS-CBN Studios; Liwayway Komiks
- Directed by: Malu L. Sevilla; Claudio "Tots" Sanchez-Mariscal IV; Don M. Cuaresma; Jojo A. Saguin
- Starring: Andi Eigenmann (Note: Portrays the title role. The co-stars are not included on the starring role.)
- Theme music composer: Rey Valera
- Opening theme: "Malayo Pa ang Umaga" by Aria Clemente and Vina Morales
- Country of origin: Philippines
- Original languages: Filipino; Cebuano
- No. of episodes: 147 (list of episodes)

Production
- Executive producers: Carlo Katigbak; Cory Vidanes; Laurenti Dyogi; Roldeo Endrinal
- Producer: Carlina D. Dela Merced
- Production locations: Metro Manila; San Quintin, Pangasinan; Mandaue, Cebu Province; Cebu City; Morong, Bataan
- Running time: 30-45 minutes
- Production company: Dreamscape Entertainment

Original release
- Network: ABS-CBN
- Release: February 8 – September 3, 2010

Related
- Mga Anghel na Walang Langit; May Bukas Pa; Momay; 100 Days to Heaven; Dahil sa Pag-ibig; Nathaniel; Huwag Kang Mangamba; Love in 40 Days

Agua Bendita (lit. 'holy water') is a 2010 Philippine television drama series broadcast by ABS-CBN. Directed by Malu L. Sevilla, Claudio "Tots" Sanchez-Mariscal IV, Don M. Cuaresma, and Jojo A. Saguin, it stars Andi Eigenmann in the title role. Other co-stars include Matteo Guidicelli, Jason Abalos, Vina Morales, John Estrada, Pilar Pilapil, Alessandra De Rossi, Dimples Romana, Carlos Agassi, Pen Medina, Malou Crisologo, Jayson Gainza, Malou de Guzman, Bing Loyzaga, Zaijian Jaranilla, and Zoren Legaspi. It aired on the network's Primetime Bida line-up and worldwide on TFC from February 8 to September 3, 2010, replacing May Bukas Pa and was replaced by Noah and 1DOL in its timeslot.

== Overview ==
Agua Bendita was a comic created by Rod Santiago in the 1980s. It was published by Liwayway Comics and adapted on television through the series, Komiks first aired in 2006 and again during Holy Week 2007, with two-part episodes in Season 1 starring Shaina Magdayao as Agua/Bendita and Rayver Cruz as Ronnie.

Agua Bendita was launched as one of the ABS-CBN's offerings for the 60th Celebration of Filipino Soap Opera ("Ika-60 taon ng Pinoy Soap Opera"), during the ABS-CBN Trade Launch for the first quarter of 2010, titled "Bagong Simula" (New Beginning).

Agua Bendita was later re-aired on Jeepney TV after its initial broadcast.

In observance of the Lenten season, Agua Bendita had its encore telecast on Maundy Thursday (April 1, 2010), Good Friday (April 2, 2010), and on Black Saturday (April 3, 2010) at 8:00 pm to 10:00 pm as part of ABS-CBN's Holy Week presentation.

The 3-part marathon special had ratings of "35% on Maundy Thursday, 26.1% on Good Friday, and 25.7% on Black Saturday".

Season	No. of chapters	No. of episodes (each chapter numbers)	Originally released	
Season	No. of chapters	No. of episodes (each chapter numbers)	First released	Last released
Prologue and 1 (1–15)	2	15	February 8, 2010	February 26, 2010
1 (16–40) and Rerun	3	25	March 1, 2010	April 3, 2010
2 (41–72)	3	32	April 5, 2010	May 21, 2010
2–3 (73–122)	3	50	May 24, 2010	July 30, 2010
3–4 (123–132)	2	10	August 2, 2010	August 13, 2010
4 and Epilogue (133–147)	2	15	August 16, 2010	September 3, 2010

== Plot ==
Desperate to save his wife from having a miscarriage, Marcial steals Father Guido's agua bendita, which is intended to cure an epileptic Criselda. He manages to save his wife and their babies, but one of their daughters is born with an unexplainable physical defect.

== Cast and characters ==
=== Main cast ===
Cast	Character	Summary
Andi Eigenmann / Xyriel Manabat (young)	Agua Cristi and Bendita Cristi	Agua was born with an unexplainable physical defect: she can heal people with tears in grief. The Bida Kontrabida. Bendita is the physically normal but insecure twin, who feels that her parents concentrate of Agua as a result of her disability, leaving little for Bendita. She struggles with her jealousy but in the end learns to be humble and to love her twin sister.
Matteo Guidicelli / Bugoy Cariño (young)	Ronnie Aguirre	Ronnie met Agua when they were children, but when they met as young adults he was blind; without knowing Agua's real identity, Ronnie learned to love her for her personality. His mother was a maid from a rich Italian family who got impregnated by the owner's son. To cover the shame, Ronnie's father left them penniless with only a house. He is Agua's love interest, favoring her more than Bendita, due to the former's kind and naive nature.
Jason Abalos / Maliksi Morales (young)	Paculdo "Paco" Barrameda	Paco the poor son of Criselda and Baldo, often called "Tod" when he was young. He met the twins when he saved their lives on separate occasions. Tasked by his mother to bring her Agua in order to be freed from her disorder, he often works different jobs which would lead him to the Cristi's during which he begins to pity Agua. He later becomes Bendita's love interest after being completely rejected by Ronnie.

=== Supporting cast ===
Cast	Character	Summary
Vina Morales	Mercedes Montenegro-Cristi	Agua and Bendita's mother, who caused Agua's disability by drinking holy water when she was pregnant.
John Estrada	Dr. Marcial Cristi	Mercedes' husband. A doctor who stole the agua bendita to cure Mercedes.
Pilar Pilapil	Doña Amalia "Wowa" Montenegro	Mercedes' mother. She is very close to Bendita, but not to Agua whom she regards as a 'freak', but do loved her and care for her, as she was protecting her from the danger. She is pretend to root of Agua's problems and Bendita's ill temper. In the finale, she was sent to the mental institution after the explosion.
Alessandra De Rossi	Divina Caguiat Montenegro	Doña Amalia's niece. She had feelings towards Marcial and Doña Amalia conspired to fulfill the Doña's goal of breaking Marcial's family bond.
Dimples Romana	Criselda Barrameda	Padre Guido's niece who was the intended recipient of the miraculous agua bendita. She is Paco's mother and has epilepsy, which the agua bendita was supposed to cure. Enraged with Marcial's deception, she and Doña Amalia set a wicked plan in which they will kidnap Agua and kill her. In the finale, she gets life imprisonment for her crimes.
Carlos Agassi	Baldomero "Baldo" Barrameda	Criselda's husband, who is a gambler and a drunk. Towards the finale, he was shot and killed after he and Marcial struggled over the gun.
Pen Medina	Padre Guido	The original owner of agua bendita and Criselda's uncle. He asked Marcial to give the agua bendita to Criselda to cure her illness. Unfortunately, Marcial stole it for Mercedes. Padre Guido appears from time to time in Agua's dreams to help her use her abilities she has gained from the agua bendita for good, though he also appears in Bendita's dreams, where he tells her that she can't use Agua's abilities because she does not deserve such privileges, and instead make her understand the error of her ways.
Malou Crisologo	Tonyang/Muchacha	Agua's nanny. She and Marcial are the only two people who knew about Agua's disability when she was born.
Jayson Gainza	Ben Ramirez	A fisherman who saved Agua from danger and raised her. He first didn't like Agua because he couldn't move on from his the death of his daughter Lenlen.
Malou de Guzman	Rosie Ramirez	Ben's wife, who helped Agua from danger and raised her. She was the first one to accept Agua before Ben.
Bing Loyzaga	Solita Aguirre	Ronnie's mother. She was once a maid on a rich Italian family. She got impregnated by one of the owner's sons.
Zaijian Jaranilla	Otep (voice)	Agua's fish (clownfish) friend.
Zoren Legaspi	Luisito "Lui" Mondigo	Lisa's son who used to court Mercedes. However, due to Mercedes' rebellion, she ended up marrying Marcial. When Mercedes and her family decided to migrate in America, he found a chance to caress Mercedes once again.

=== Guest cast ===
Cast	Character	Summary
Neil Ryan Sese	Señor Lucas	A fake healer who helped Criselda when they needed some money. Criselda acts as if she is being healed by Lucas to attract customers.
Lollie Mara	Doña Caridad Montenegro	Amalia's sister. She is Divina's cruel stepmother.
Lyka Ugarte	Doña Lisa Mondigo	Amalia's friend who owned the boat intended to bring the Cristi family to their hiding island.
Miguel de Guzman	Buknoy	Tod's co-worker and friend
Angel Sy	Bimpy	Daughter of the water theme park owner, healed by Agua.
Kimberly Faye	Jocelyn	
Kristine Bartucio	Maldita Woman (Episode 1)	

== Theme song ==
The show uses "Malayo Pa Ang Umaga" as its theme song, originally composed and sung by Rey Valera. The first version is sung by Aria Clemente and the second version is sung by Vina Morales.
