= Gimme 5 (group) =

Filipino boy-band

- Origin: Philippines
- Years active: 2013–2017
- Label: Star Music
- Past members: Nash Aguas; Joaquin Reyes; Grae Fernandez; Brace Arquiza; John Bermundo
- Website: Gimme 5 on Star Music

Gimme 5 was a boy band in the Philippines who were signed under the Star Music label.

== History ==
In 2013, the band debuted on ASAP 18 where they performed British boy band the Wanted's "Glad You Came". The group admits to not being good singers. Nash even describes his voice as "parang pinunit na maong (like a denim being torn)". Since then, the group improved themselves as singers, dancers and models. Their following on social media had also grown since.

In November 2014, Gimme 5 released their self-titled debut album under Star Music.

They also starred in the TV series Bagito alongside Alexa Ilacad, Ella Cruz and Angel Aquino which ended in March 2015.

The group were interviewed by Myx on how they got their group name which was supposedly named "Baby Boys" which they found "baduy".

After the TV series Bagito, they resumed their album tour which was slowed down due to the TV series. Sold out album tours were held in different places in the Philippines, giving their fans a chance to watch them perform live. The group also shared in an interview with PUSH a memorable fan experience at the Albay Astrodome in Legazpi.

They first won an award in June 2015, as "Most Promising Recording/Performing Group" at the 46th GMMSF Box-Office Entertainment Awards.

On August 14, 2015, the Teen Power: The Kabataan Pinoy Concert Party led by Gimme 5 and joined by the PBB 737 Teen Housemates was held at the Aliw Theater in Pasay.

In September 2015, Gimme 5 won the Clash of Celebrities on Saturday, which was part of the kick-off celebration for the sixth anniversary of It's Showtime held at the Smart Araneta Coliseum.

After a year of touring, their final leg was held in Dagupan on May 7, 2016. After their final leg, they decided to lean on acting as individuals.

In 2017, the group came back to release their second album, Sophomore, under Star Music. Consisting of five new tracks, two of those were written by group members — the track "First Love" by Aguas and "Hindi Ko Alam" by Reyes.

== Members ==
The teen male group was composed of five members: Brace Arquiza, Grae Fernandez, Joaquin Reyes, John Bermundo, and Nash Aguas.

- Nash Aguas – lead and backing vocals, rhythm guitar, keyboards, lead guitar, bass, dancing
- Brace Arquiza – backing and lead vocals, lead guitar, bass, rhythm guitar, keyboards, dancing
- John Bermundo – backing and occasional lead vocals, bass, keyboards, dancing
- Grae Fernandez – lead and backing vocals, drums, percussion, dancing
- Joaquin Reyes – backing and lead vocals, keyboards, organ, bass, rhythm guitar, dancing

== Discography ==
=== Studio albums ===
On 6 November 2014, Gimme 5 released their debut album under Star Music.

Gimme 5

Studio album by Gimme 5
- Released: November 6, 2014
- Recorded: 2014
- Genres: OPM, pop
- Length: 41:49
- Languages: English, Filipino
- Label: Star Music

No.	Title	Artist	Length
1.	"Pag Kasama Ka"	Gimme 5	3:25
2.	"Hatid Sundo"	Gimme 5	3:06
3.	"Aking Prinsesa"	Gimme 5	4:05
4.	"Hey Girl"	Gimme 5	3:44
5.	"Growing Up"	Gimme 5	3:07
6.	"Ikaw Na Na"	Gimme 5	3:24

Additional Tracks (Minus One)
No.	Title	Artist	Length
1.	"Pag Kasama Ka (Minus One)"	Gimme 5	3:25
2.	"Hatid Sundo (Minus One)"	Gimme 5	3:06
3.	"Aking Prinsesa (Minus One)"	Gimme 5	4:05
4.	"Hey Girl (Minus One)"	Gimme 5	3:44
5.	"Growing Up (Minus One)"	Gimme 5	3:07
6.	"Ikaw Na Na (Minus One)"	Gimme 5	3:24

On 29 April 2017, Gimme 5 released their second album.

Sophomore

EP by GImme 5
- Released: April 29, 2017
- Recorded: 2017
- Genres: OPM, pop
- Length: 17:43
- Languages: English, Filipino
- Label: Star Music

No.	Title	Artist	Length
1.	"First Love"	Gimme 5	3:28
2.	"Hanggang Tingin Na Lang"	Gimme 5	3:48
3.	"Hindi Ko Alam"	Gimme 5	3:16
4.	"Walang Dahilan"	Gimme 5	3:27
5.	"Napapangiti"	Gimme 5	3:41
Total length:			17:43

=== Singles ===
Year	Track	Artist	Details	Ref.
2015	"Aking Prinsesa"	Gimme 5	Words & melody by: Daryl Barbaso & Brian Barbaso; Video edited by: Eaizen Almazan & Archelle de Belen	
2015	"Hey Girl"	Gimme 5	Words & melody by: Kennard Faraon; Lyric video by: Jasmine Marie Maragay	
2015	"Growing Up"	Gimme 5	Words and music by: Rox Santos; Beat and arrangement by: Kidwolf	
2017	"Walang Dahilan"	Gimme 5	Words & music by: Jay Sule; Arrangement by: Theo Martel	

=== Music videos ===
Year	Title	Artist	Details	Ref.
2014	"Hatid Sundo"	Gimme 5	Words & Melody By: Miles Noel & KidWolf; Beat & Arrangement By: KidWolf; Vocal Arrangement By: Miles Noel & Francis Salazar; Mastered & Produced By: KidWolf; Published By: Star Songs, Inc.; Release Date: 12 December 2014	
2015	"Pag Kasama Ka"	Gimme 5	Words & Melody By: Francis Salazar; Beat & Arrangement By: Francis Salazar & KidWolf; Vocal Arrangement By: Francis Salazar; Mixed & Mastered By: KidWolf; Produced By: KidWolf; Published By: Star Songs, Inc.; Released Date: 28 March 2015	
2017	"Walang Dahilan"	Gimme 5	Words & Music By: Jay Sule; Arrangement By: Theo Martel; Mixed & Mastered By: KidWolf & Theo Martel; Published By: Star Songs, Inc.; Released Date: 12 May 2017	

=== Composition credits ===
Year	Title	Album	Performed by	Written by	Music by	Label
2017	"First Love"	Sophomore	Gimme 5	Nash Aguas	—N/a	Star Music
2017	"Hindi Ko Alam"	Sophomore	Gimme 5	Joaquin Reyes	Joaquin Reyes	Star Music

== Filmography ==
=== TV series ===
Year	Title	Network	Ref.
2015	Bagito	ABS-CBN	

=== TV shows ===
Year	Title	Network	Notes	Ref.
2014	ASAP	ABS-CBN	2014–2017, Performer	
2014	Gandang Gabi, Vice!	ABS-CBN	Special guests	
2014	It's Showtime	ABS-CBN	Special guests	
2017	Matanglawin	ABS-CBN	Special guests	

=== Concerts ===
Year	Title	Venue	Line-up	Producer
2015	St. Teresa College: Concert for a Cause	St. Teresa College	Gimme 5; Alexa Ilacad	—N/a
2015	Teen Power: The Kabataang Pinoy Concert	Aliw Theater	Gimme 5; Alexa Ilacad; Ylona Garcia; Ailah; Bailey May; Barbie Imperial; Tomas Franco; Jimboy Martin; Kamille Filoteo; Kenzo Gutierrez; Kyle Edward secades; Ryan; Zonia Mejia; Juan Karlos Labajo; Kobi Vidanes; Jairus Aquino; Sharlene San Pedro	ABS-CBN, Star Events
2017	4 of a Kind: the Un4gettable Concert	Music Museum	Main Act: Sue Ramirez; Loisa Andalio; Maris Racal; Krister Fulgar; Special Guest: Gimme 5	—N/a

== Accolades ==
Year	Award-giving body	Category	Nominated work	Result	Ref.
2015	46th GMMSF Box-Office Entertainment Awards	Most Promising Recording/Performing Group	Gimme 5	Won	
2016	Myx Music Awards	Favorite Group	Gimme 5	Nominated	
