= Dok Ricky, Pedia =

- Title card
- Genre: Sitcom; Commentary
- Created by: ABS-CBN Corporation
- Developed by: ABS-CBN Lingkod Kapamilya Foundation; National Nutrition Council; Department of Health
- Written by: John Paul Melosantos; Dante Valle; Albert Cruz
- Directed by: Jon Red
- Starring: Dominic Ochoa; Louise Abuel; Yen Santos; Alessandra de Rossi
- Theme music composer: Gherns Calina; Marvin Querido
- Opening theme: "Dok Ricky, Pedia" by Kristel Fulgar and CJ Navato
- Country of origin: Philippines
- Original language: Tagalog
- No. of seasons: 4
- No. of episodes: 122

Production
- Producers: Maria Cecilia Reyes; Jane Foronda
- Editors: Portia Rutaquio; Glenmar Marco; Debbie Arcilla
- Running time: 30 minutes
- Production companies: ABS-CBN Foundation; National Nutrition Council; ABS-CBN Studios

Original release
- Network: ABS-CBN
- Release: September 9, 2017 – January 18, 2020

Dok Ricky, Pedia ng Barangay is a Philippine situational comedy and commentary show broadcast by ABS-CBN, it stars Dominic Ochoa, Louise Abuel, Yen Santos and Alessandra de Rossi. It aired on the network's Yes Weekend! morning block and worldwide on TFC from September 9, 2017 to January 18, 2020, replacing G Diaries. The sitcom tackles the events in the first 1000 days of a child from conception up to second birth age. The series returned to Kapamilya Channel on January 30, 2022, but only for reruns from past episodes.

== Synopsis ==
Dok Ricky is a pediatrician and single father who arrives to the health clinic of the fictional town of Barangay Masigla to help the community care for its babies and children. He will be surrounded by the townspeople who will make their journey to healthier minds and nourishing hearts become more energetic.

== Cast ==
=== Main cast ===
- Dominic Ochoa as Ricardo "Dok Ricky" Santos, Pedia
- Louise Abuel as Johann Santos
- Alessandra de Rossi as Dra. Marikina "Dok Riki" Bautista
- Kristel Fulgar as Trixie
- CJ Navato as Thor
- Nash Aguas as Ash
- Lotlot Bustamante as Kap Cora
- Rj Seggara as Tatang
- Yen Santos as Teacher Julia

=== Supporting cast ===
- Epy Quizon as Dok Martin
- Kate Alejandrino as Queenie
- Donna Cariaga as Donna
- Don Jake Consuegra as Bruce
- James Caraan as Joey
- Nomer Tajonera as Tony
- Alora Sasam as Melanie
- Sam Shoaf as Albert
- Luke Alford as Michael
- Krystal Brimner as Angel

=== Guest cast ===
- Mitch Naco as Mae
- Francine Diaz as Lindsey
- Ryan Rems as Aaron
- Igiboy Flores as Mr. Chanz
- Tart Carlos as Lynda
- Viveika Ravanes as Lynette
- EJ Jallorina as RJ
- Meg Imperial as Samantha
- Cindy Miranda as Irene
- Joj Agpangan as Elsa
- Raine Salamante as Leslie Fae
- KaladKaren Davila as herself
- Assunta de Rossi as Dok Vicky
- Victor Anastacio as Scott
- Anthony Andres as Edmund
- Peachie Dioquino-Valera as Pops

== See also ==
- List of programs broadcast by ABS-CBN
- List of Kapamilya Channel original programming
- ABS-CBN Foundation
- National Nutrition Council (Philippines)
