= Class of 2018 =

- Class of 2018 theatrical movie poster
- Directed by: Charliebebs Gohetia
- Written by: Charliebebs Gohetia; Jericho Aguado
- Produced by: Armi Rae Cacanindin
- Starring: Sharlene San Pedro; Nash Aguas
- Cinematography: Albert Banzon
- Edited by: Lawrence Ang
- Music by: Len Calvo
- Production company: T-Rex Entertainment
- Release date: November 7, 2018
- Running time: 119 minutes
- Country: Philippines
- Languages: Filipino; English

Class of 2018 is a 2018 Filipino teen suspense–thriller film directed by Charliebebs Gohetia. It stars Sharlene San Pedro and Nash Aguas. The film was produced and distributed by T-Rex Entertainment. It premiered in the Philippines on November 7, 2018.

== Synopsis ==
Del Pilar National High School hosts a class full of rejects. Section Zamora, the name of the 12th grade class, goes on a field trip to Mt. Bantayog for an earth science project. During their excursion, one of them contracts a mysterious virus. Due to its disturbing symptoms, the whole section is quarantined by the military in an abandoned facility. They are soon forced to fight for survival as the unknown virus spreads. Anyone who is infected develops intense aggressiveness and a thirst for violence. Main characters Ada (Sharlene San Pedro), RJ (Nash Aguas), Princess (Kristel Fulgar), and Migs (CJ Navato) fight for survival as they deal with the dangers of the virus and politics among untrustworthy classmates.

== Cast ==
Following is a list of the full cast of Class of 2018 film:

=== Main cast ===
- Sharlene San Pedro as Ada Marie Umali
- Nash Aguas as Joseph "RJ" Vencio II
- Kristel Fulgar as Princess Sta. Maria
- CJ Navato as Miguelito "Migs" Ambal III
- Kiray Celis as Venus Flor Carangay

=== Supporting cast ===
- Luis Alandy as Sir Patrick
- Yayo Aguila as Selina
- Fe Gingging Hyde as Carolyn
- Dido dela Paz as General
- Sherry Lara as Hera

Section Zamora students

- Aga Arceo as Ericson Stan Matias
- Lara Fortuna as Jonalyn Mae Bibal
- Michelle Vito as Tammy
- Ethan Salvador as Trent Michael Salvador
- John Vic De Guzman as Janus "Jamir" Miranda
- Kelvin Miranda as Ishmael Earl Evangelista
- Jomari Angeles as Jason Donald Chavez
- Renshi de Guzman as Louie
- Shiara Dizon as Michele Ley "Misha" Quitain
- Hannah Francisco as Rona Gene "Ergoe" Ang
- Noubikko Ray as Van Herbosa
- Eisen Lim as Andrew James 'B1' San Agustin
- Kaiser Boado as Norbito 'B2' Cruz
- Jude Servilla as Joaquin Ace "Wacky" Balagtas
- Dylan Ray Talon as Randell Flores Basilag
- Yvette Sanchez as Anna Patricia "Tracy" Magsakay
- Micah Jackson as Grace
- Jerom Canlas as Nonario A "Nor" Sto. Domingo II
- Nikki Gonzales as Luchi Sweet "Chynna" Gonzales

== Production ==
T-Rex Entertainment, an independent Filipino production company which started in late 2015, began producing Class of 2018 during the first half of 2018. The project was headed by its executive producer Rex Tiri, who had produced films such as dark comedy Patay na si Hesus in 2016 and comedy-drama musical Deadma Walking in 2017.

The film is the eighth full-length film by filmmaker Charliebebs "Bebs" Gohetia, who had recently directed Bagyong Beverlynn. He described the film as a "survival-of-the-fittest" movie. He stated: "I think what makes it special is it is kind of a reinvention of the (suspense-thriller) genre". It deals with a cross-genre theme as it involves suspense, drama, romance, and situational comedy. Together with Jericho Aguado, Gohetia wrote the screenplay of Class of 2018, and later on, he directed the film.

=== Casting and development ===
Class of 2018 marks the first film of Aguas and San Pedro as lead actors as well as their first film together as a love team. They were part of the original cast of the sketch comedy show Goin' Bulilit when they were children, together with Fulgar, Navato, and Celis. They were first introduced as cast of the film during its story conference held at Limbaga 77 Cafe in Quezon City on May 22. At the same time, T-Rex Entertainment announced the news on their social media accounts.

According to Aguas, their team-up in the film can be considered a fulfilment of their fans' wishes. Since entering the entertainment industry starting from Star Circle Quest back in 2004, NashLene fans (derived from their names: Nash and Sharlene) have already been supporting them as a pair. Aguas mentioned that despite them not being introduced as an official love team, their fans have always been there to support them. The director mentioned the feeling of nostalgia whenever the two are seen together. As claimed by the multimedia magazine Village Pipol: "[w]ith Sharlene San Pedro and Nash Aguas' cuteness and palpable chemistry, they became one of the youngest love teams loved by millions of Filipinos".

San Pedro was surprised to have been given the lead role, as it had been a while since she was given an acting role. Her drama episode in Maalaala Mo Kaya (for which she received the "Best Single Performance by an Actress" nomination at the 32nd PMPC Star Awards for Television) was her most recent work. She was a regular video jockey in MYX during this time. She was excited because the film is something the Filipino viewers have never seen before; a film they do not normally see on their screens. The film also has elements of dark themes, drama, and rom-com, according to Aguas.

The first time San Pedro learned about the project, she was offered to do the character of Princess (which became Fulgar's role later on). The lead roles were initially given to different actors. She thought the story was something new so she accepted the supporting role. The day before the screen test, she was told that she would play Ada's character instead. Other than scheduling conflicts with the initial actors, the production team felt Aguas and San Pedro would fit better for the roles of RJ and Ada, according to Gohetia. In fact, he suggested them to T-Rex Entertainment during the initial pitch. He shared the sentiment of NashLene fans for wanting Aguas and San Pedro to have a project together. He said: "It's a different launching film for them, a new path".

=== Filming ===
Principal photography on the film began in early June in the Philippines. Filming locations include Subic of Zambales province, where a significant portion of the film was shot for forest settings, and San Jose del Monte, Philippines.

In preparation for her role, San Pedro worked hard to be fit. Besides working out regularly and controlling her eating portions, she learned how to improve her posture. In an interview, San Pedro mentioned how intense the shooting for the film was. She stated in one interview that she was not feeling well at that time, most likely because she was "over-fatigued". She added that it was the first time she and other cast members experienced such scenes.

During the press conference held in October, she once again reiterated how difficult it was to shoot some scenes, particularly the action scenes. Aguas added he always felt tired after every shooting. For him, it was the two-minute continuous fight scene with his co-actor (Ethan Salvador) that was the most difficult part in the filming. However, both Aguas and San Pedro were satisfied to have portrayed action roles.

Aguas noted that working with his female lead was easy as they were already working closely together since they were little. Aguas shared his sentiment about his friendship with San Pedro as he stated that San Pedro is the type of friend who, even though they do not communicate for a long time, stays the same. Celis, another Goin Bulilit alumni added in a separate interview, "[t]he original cast of Goin Bulilit do not need to adjust (to be comfortable on set). Whenever they meet, they just enjoy one another's company."

=== Music ===
One of the songs featured in the film is titled "Laruan" by The Roxymorrons. The released Class of 2018 teaser features an eerie version of "Itanong Mo Sa Mga Bata", originally performed by the 1970s Filipino folk-rock band Asin.

== Promotion ==
On September 14, 2018, a one-minute teaser was released through T-Rex Entertainment's official Facebook and YouTube accounts. It features the first few verses of the lyrics of the song "Itanong Mo Sa Mga Bata". With the tag "Our lesson for today is SURVIVAL", the teaser had a short synopsis: "...follows the story of a group of students who were sent to a quarantined military facility after one of their classmates got infected with a yet to be identified virus".

On October 7, a two-minute trailer was released through the film producer's social media accounts with the tag "Study hard. Kill harder". Different from the suspense-themed teaser, the trailer focused more on action scenes in which the cast, primarily San Pedro, show off their fighting skills. It is also evident that "elements from other end-of-the-world and kill-or-be-killed properties are present".

A press conference was held by T-Rex Entertainment on October 17, accompanied by a livestream through Instagram. Eight days later, another conference was held at Limbaga 77 Cafe Restaurant.

The film premiered on the night of November 6 at the TriNoma Cinemas in Quezon City, and it opened in cinemas the day after on November 7. It is rated R-16 by the MTRCB. The cast had several mall shows and TV guesting soon after to promote their upcoming film.

== Reception ==
The film received average to favorable reviews from the critics. According to Alwin Ignacio of Abante, it has the "semblance of a balance and mix of commercial viability and artistic excellence". For Reggee Bonoan of Bandera, its comedy scenes balanced the surprise factor. Francis Cruz of Rappler also agrees, but believes it to be a bit lacking. For him, the film is a "hodgepodge". He stated: "The film is actually entertaining. There are funny bits here and there, with some moments of suspense to balance out the silliness. Some of the scenes manage to be compelling, raising moral quandaries on top of all the political implications. What the film really needs is to edit its ideas, to limit what it wants to do, its stylistic flourishes, and its garish attempts at camp".

The main cast received mostly satisfactory reviews. According to Jun Nardo of Bandera, Sharlene San Pedro's performance was commendable, particularly her fight scenes. Ricky Calderon of The Freeman added: "The cast did a fine job, with special mention to Sharlene who nailed her role to perfection". Ignacio agreed, saying she has a screen presence; she achieved in performing her role, whether during fight-scenes, heart-fluttering scenes or drama scenes.

Both San Pedro and Fulgar were acting consistently based on their characters' emotions, said Mercado of Wow Showbiz. When Fulgar said one of her lines, Ignacio commented: "Anyone who can say with so much aplomb [the lines] truly deserves a round of applause".

Nash Aguas' good acting performance was already expected; "a delight and a natural charmer", said Ignacio. Bonoan felt it was somewhat lacking compared to what Aguas did in the series The Good Son. Bonoan added that the director probably did not give him a better impression in the film to avoid him overpowering the other cast members. This supported the claim of Nardo, who said that despite its large number of students, each are given their own spotlight in the film. According to Cruz, the disadvantage is that "the result is more like a collage of insignificant stories that only unnecessarily divert drama from the main characters".

The performance of Kiray Celis, who played the mean girl in the class, was predominantly favored by the critics. While Nardo and Calderon describe her as the "scene stealer" of the show who does so "effortlessly", according to the latter, Mercado said many will find her character likable. Bonoan added that although her character is annoying from the start, people will still love her in the end. Ignacio added: "she is naturally funny in all her scenes".

== Awards ==
Year	Award-Giving Body	Category	Recipient	Result
2019	PMPC Star Awards for Movies	Love Team of the Year	Nash Aguas and Sharlene San Pedro	Nominated
