= Kira Balinger =

Filipino actress and performer (born 2000)

- Born: Kira Marie Pacifico Balinger; August 3, 2000 (age 26); Hong Kong
- Citizenship: Filipino; Hong Kong; British
- Occupations: Actress, performer
- Years active: 2014–present
- Agent: Star Magic (2017–present)
- Height: 5 ft 4 in (163 cm)

Kira Marie Pacifico Balinger (born August 3, 2000) is a British-Filipino actress and performer. She is best-known for her portrayals in Ang sa Iyo ay Akin and Darna.

== Early life ==
Kira Marie Pacifico Balinger was born on August 3, 2000, in Hong Kong to a British father and a Filipino mother. Her family moved to Addlestone, England, where she spent most of her childhood. She has an older sister. During her childhood, Balinger was an acrobatic gymnast.

Balinger and her parents moved to the Philippines in 2010. Her parents separated when she was eleven; they remained married, and her father visited regularly from Hong Kong. She was scouted by ABS-CBN’s Star Magic talent agency while at a mall in 2014.

== Career ==
After signing with Star Magic in 2014, Balinger participated in workshops. In 2016, she made her main screen debut as part of the cast of the soap opera The Story of Us. Johnny Manahan recalled that when Balinger first approached his office, she didn't speak Tagalog. He advised her, "If you want to be an artist, you have to learn the language." After eight months, Manahan noted that "she had workable Tagalog" and that no accent was detectable.

In 2017, Balinger was part of ASAP project girl group, BFF5. The group launched their book, Sugar & Spice, a manual for teens, at the 2017 Manila International Book Fair, where they also held a book signing. The following year, the group disbanded, and Balinger joined the cast of the new season of the Cine Mo! comedy series Funny Ka, Pare Ko alongside Grae Fernandez. She also made a special appearance on the fantasy comedy film Fantastica, portraying the younger version of Jaclyn Jose's character, Fec. In addition, Balinger was one of the cover stars for Metro Magazine's 28th anniversary issue.

In 2019, Balinger joined the cast of the primetime family series Pamilya Ko, portraying Lemon, a quiet and often overlooked member of the family.

In late 2020, Balinger signed an exclusive contract with ABS-CBN. That year, she was cast as Hope Villarosa in the revenge melodrama Ang sa Iyo ay Akin, where she reunites with co-star Fernandez. In describing her experience working with Balinger, co-star Iza Calzado shared, “Working with her for this soap was like watching a flower bloom. I still remember what she was like on the first day and how she progressed and came into her own.” In 2021, Balinger and Fernandez were nominated for Loveteam of the Year at the RAWR Awards.

In 2022, Balinger made her return to acting, with the role of school valedictorian Erika Aguador in the television miniseries Beach Bros. She was also featured in OPM artist Zack Tabudlo's Pano Trilogy, starring in his "Pano", "Anghel", and "Yakap" music videos. The same year, Balinger was revealed as part of the cast ensemble of the Mars Ravelo's Darna remake. In an interview with TV5, she revealed that she auditioned for the show three times—first for the titular role, then for Valentina, and finally for the character she ultimately portrayed, Luna.

In 2024, she starred in her first major film role in the romantic drama film Chances Are, You and I as the optimistic Gabi Sinag. The film premiered as a spotlight entry at the Jinseo Arigato International Film Festival in Japan and was later released worldwide on Netflix. Reflecting on the film’s message, Balinger said, “Our characters aim to raise awareness about brain illness, which is a global issue. We hope people who are suffering from mental health issues will find inspiration in our story.” She also appeared in family-oriented TV show, Padyak Princess. In September of that year, Balinger walked the Bench Fashion Week Holiday 2024 show runway.

In 2025, Balinger was revealed among the initial lineup of Kapamilya housemates for reality TV show Pinoy Big Brother: Celebrity Collab Edition. Representing her hometown, she entered the house with the moniker “Ang Hopeful Belle ng Cavite.” Paired with Charlie Fleming, she was the second evictee of the season, exiting on Day 35. She would later participate in the wildcard round for the edition. After failing to earn a spot back in the house, Balinger returned later in the season as a house challenger.

== Other ventures ==
=== Advocacy and philanthropy ===
In July 2024, Balinger helped deliver relief goods to victims of Super Typhoon Carina, inspired by a quote from Darna, a role she once auditioned for. She shared on Instagram:

“Darna once said, ‘Ang pinakamalaking kasalanan ay kapag may kakayahan kang tumulong pero wala kang ginawa.’ (transl. The greatest sin is when you have the ability to help but choose to do nothing)... I’m not Darna, but just a simple person who wanted to share my blessings to those who were affected by Super Typhoon Carina.”

Balinger visited Marikina, where she had previously filmed Padyak Princess, to personally deliver relief boxes to affected residents.

=== Endorsements ===
In July 2023, Balinger was announced as the brand ambassador for RDL. She called it an honor to represent a brand that had empowered Filipinos for generations, adding that she looked forward to how RDL would continue to inspire people around the world. She also serves as a brand ambassador for Bench's underwear line.

In 2025, Balinger was a part of National Book Store's "National Hunt" campaign.

== Personal life ==
She shows her artwork on an Instagram account, Galleria De Kira. In a 2025 interview Balinger said that she and co-star LA Santos had been in a past relationship.

== Filmography ==
Key
†	Denotes films and TV productions that have not yet been released

=== Film ===
Year	Title	Role	Notes	Ref.
2018	Fantastica	Young Fec	Entry for the 44th Metro Manila Film Festival	
2019	Familia Blondina	Jenny		
2019	G!	Menchie	3rd Pista ng Pelikulang Pilipino entry	
2020	James & Pat & Dave	Dave's girlfriend		
2024	Chances Are, You and I	Gabriel Sinag	Spotlight entry for the Jinseo Arigato International Film Festival	
2024	Maple Leaf Dreams	Molly	Entry for the 6th Sinag Maynila Film Festival	
2025	Co-Love	Melody	Entry for the CinePanalo Film Festival	
2026	18th Rose	Mara		
2026	Huwag Kang Titingin	Liza Bustamante		

=== Television ===
Year	Title	Role	Notes	Ref.
2016	The Story of Us	Caitlyn Morrison		
2016–2017	The Greatest Love	Waywaya "Y" Soledad		
2016–2018	Funny Ka, Pare Ko	Herself		
2017	Maalaala Mo Kaya	Carla	Episode: "Bahay"	
2017	Ipaglaban Mo!	Angel Ramos	Episode: "Tali"	
2018	Alamat ng Ano	Chunchai	Season 1, Episode 10	
2018	Spirits: Reawaken	Maya	Main Role	
2018	ASAP Natin 'To	Herself	Regular Member	
2018	Maalaala Mo Kaya	Grace	Episode: "Pilat"	
2018	Ipaglaban Mo!	Ginnie	Episode: "Eskapo"	
2019	Ipaglaban Mo!	Isabel	Episode: "Barang"	
2019	Pamilya Ko	Lemon Jane R. Mabunga	Main Role	
2020	Bawal Na Game Show	Herself / Player		
2020–2021	Ang sa Iyo ay Akin	Hope C. Villarosa	Support Role	
2021	Maalaala Mo Kaya	Cha	Episode: "Libro"	
2022	Beach Bros	Erika Aguador	Main Role	
2022–2023	Mars Ravelo's Darna	Luna	Recurring Role	
2023-2024	Nag-aapoy na Damdamin	Young Victoria		
2024	Padyak Princess	Lyca Dela Cruz		
2024	Eat Bulaga!	Herself	Guest performer	
2025	How to Spot a Red Flag	Christine		
2025	Pinoy Big Brother: Celebrity Collab Edition	Herself / Housemate	Regular housemate; evicted on Day 35	
2025	It's Showtime	Herself	Guest performer	
2025	Rainbow Rumble	Herself / Contestant		
2026	Pinoy Big Brother: Celebrity Collab Edition 2.0	Herself / Houseguest	Day 108	
2026	The Secrets of Hotel 88	Trixie Madrigal		
2026	The Loyalty Game	Angel Lucto		
2026	Barangay Love Stories	Ling-Ling	Episode: "Paraiso"	
2026	KMJS' Gabi ng Lagim XIV	Julie Vega	Segment: "The Mysterious Case of Julie Vega"	

=== Music videos ===
Year	Song	Artist
2016	"Dahil Sa'yo"	Iñigo Pascual
2022	"Pano"	Zack Tabudlo
2022	"Anghel"	Zack Tabudlo
2022	"Yakap"	Zack Tabudlo
2025	"Aya"	Earl Agustin

== Accolades ==
Awards and NominationsAwards and nominations received by Kira Balinger
Award	Year	Category	Nominated work	Result	Ref.
CinePanalo Film Festival 2025	2025	Panalong Pangalawang Aktres ("Best Supporting Actress")	Co-Love	Nominated	
Myx Music Award	2018	Myx Celebrity VJ of the Year	Herself	Nominated	
PMPC Star Awards for Movies	2019	Glupa Glowing Gal Award	—N/a	Won	
PMPC Star Awards for Movies	2025	Movie Loveteam of the Year (Note: Shared with LA Santos.)	Maple Leaf Dreams	Nominated	
PMPC Star Awards for Television	2016	Best New Female TV Personality	The Story Of Us	Nominated	
RAWR Awards	2021	Loveteam of the Year (Note: Shared with Grae Fernandez.)	—N/a	Nominated	
6th Sinag Maynila Film Festival	2024	Best Actress	Maple Leaf Dreams	Nominated	
Star Magic Halloween Ball	2019	Metro's Best Female Transformation Award	—N/a	Won	
