= Joaquín Reyes =

Joaquín Reyes may refer to:

- Joaquín Reyes (Spanish actor), Spanish actor
- Joaquin Reyes (Filipino actor), Filipino actor
- Joaquín Reyes (footballer), Mexican football player
- Joaquín Reyes (tennis)
