= Brace Arquiza =

Filipino actor, model and singer-dancer (born 2000)

- Born: Brace Henry Arquiza; Bacoor, Cavite, Philippines
- Other names: Brace, Henry
- Occupations: Actor; dancer; singer
- Years active: 2012–present
- Agents: Star Magic (2012–2020) Star Music (2012–2020) Tyronne Escalante Artist Management (2020–present); Virtual Playground (2020–present)
- Height: 1.73 m (5 ft 8 in)
- Website: Brace Arquiza on Instagram

Brace Henry Arquiza is a Filipino actor, model, dancer and singer from Cavite, Philippines. Currently, he is a talent of ABS-CBN and is known for his role as Toffer in the primetime series Bagito. He was also a member of the boy band Gimme 5.

== Early life and education ==
Arquiza discovered his passion for performing at a young age, particularly in dancing. He has been publicly associated with the University of Makati (UMak), notably participating in community greetings for the university's milestone events.

== Acting career ==
In 2011, he won the ASAP Supahdance contest.

In 2012, he played Aaron in the drama series Wansapanataym: Magic Shoes.

In 2013, he was launched as a part of the boygroup Gimme 5 together with his friends Joaquin Reyes, John Bermundo, Grae Fernandez and Nash Aguas. The group debuted in ASAP 18 where they performed the Wanted's "Glad You Came". Since then, the group regularly performed in ASAP. He also made appearances in Maalaala Mo Kaya for the episodes "Bimpo" and "Notebook".

In 2014, he starred in Wansapanataym's Perfecto alongside Nash Aguas, Alexa Ilacad, and the rest of the Gimme 5 members. In the same year, he starred in the TV series Bagito which was based on the Wattpad series of the same name by Noreen Capili alongside Nash Aguas, Alexa Ilacad, Ella Cruz, Angel Aquino and his fellow-members Joaquin Reyes, Grae Fernandez and John Bermundo.

Soon after, Gimme 5 released their self-titled debut album under Star Music which its carrier single, "Hatid Sundo".

In 2015, Gimme 5 won their first award as "Most Promising Recording/Performing Group" at the 46th GMMSF Box-Office Entertainment Awards.

In the same year, the "Teen Power: The Kabataan Pinoy Concert Party" led by Gimme 5 and joined by the PBB 737 Teen Housemates was held at the Aliw Theater in Pasay.

In 2017, the group came back to release their Sophomore album under Star Music, consisting of 5 new tracks with its carrier single, "Walang Dahilan".

In 2022, he joined the Eat Bulaga!'s segment Bida Next with Christian Dom Real.

In January 2023, Arquiza joined the Tanghalian Feel Good segment Kween of the Leader with Maja-Dayaw and Maja-Stig of Dancing Kween, aside from that he joined with Christian Dom Real with their cover version of Barry Manilow's I Write The Songs just in time for valentines day.

== Other ventures ==
=== Gaming and Content Creation ===
Arquiza shifted heavily into the digital creator space by exploring his interests in gaming. In November 2022, he officially signed with the AMPLFY Creator Program, an initiative managed by the esports and entertainment agency Tier One Entertainment. Through this venture, he positions himself as an actor-gamer and digital content creator, capitalizing on live streams and community engagement to reach a tech-savvy audience.

=== Tech and Lifestyle Endorsements ===
As an influencer, his digital portfolio features partnerships with several lifestyle and consumer tech brands.

=== Personalized Fan Engagements ===
He also monetizes his fan base through direct-to-consumer digital services. He is featured on the video-shoutout platform Shawtout, where fans can pay for personalized video greetings, corporate shoutouts, and custom messages.

== Acting credits ==
=== Film ===
Key
†	Denotes films that have not yet been released

Brace Arquiza's film credits with year of release, film titles and roles
Year	Title	Role	Ref.
2021	Rabid	Walter	
2022	Yorme: The Isko Domagoso Story	Teen Friend	

=== Television ===
Key
†	Denotes shows that have not yet been released

Brace Arquiza's television credits with year of release, television titles and roles
Year	Title	Role	Ref.
2012	Wansapanataym: Magic Shoes	Aaron	
2013	Maalaala Mo Kaya: Bimpo	Vicente's Friend	
2013	Maalaala Mo Kaya: Notebook	Billy	
2014–2026	ASAP XP	Himself / Performer	
2014	Wansapanataym: Enchanted House	Wolfie	
2014	Wansapanataym: Perfecto	Dennis	
2014	Bagito	Toffer Kalaw	
2015	Maalaala Mo Kaya: Class Card	James Bautista	
2015	Luv U	Skater No. 2	
2015	Ipaglaban Mo: Nawaglit na Tiwala	Alex	
2015	Pasión de Amor	young Gabriel Salcedo	
2015	FPJ's Ang Probinsyano	Ryan Guzman	
2015	Maalaala Mo Kaya: Lubid (III)	Aaron	
2016	Family Feud	Himself	
2016	Maalaala Mo Kaya: Kadena	Jamil	
2016	Maalaala Mo Kaya: Silver Medal	young Gerwin	
2017	Maalaala Mo Kaya: Mansanas at Juice	Ricky	
2017	Wansapanataym: Louis Biton	Jordan	
2018	Sana Dalawa ang Puso	Patrick's bullies	
2019	Maalaala Mo Kaya: Journal	Allen	
2019	Starla	teenage Philip	
2021	Maalaala Mo Kaya: Jacket	Joel	
2021	Maalaala Mo Kaya: Tattoo	Angelo	
2022	Flower of Evil	young Rico	
2022	Eat Bulaga!	Bida Next Winner / Contestant	

== Accolades ==
Year	Award-giving body	Category	Nominated work	Result	Ref.
2015	46th GMMSF Box-Office Entertainment Awards	Most Promising Recording/Performing Group	Gimme 5	Won	
2016	Myx Music Awards	Favorite Group	Gimme 5	Nominated	
