= Grae Fernandez =

Filipino actor, host and singer-dancer (born 2001)

- Born: Grace Cameron Garcia Fernandez; November 7, 2001 (age 24); Manila, Philippines
- Occupations: Actor; singer; dancer
- Years active: 2013–present
- Agent: Star Magic (2014–present)
- Height: 1.80 m (5 ft 11 in)
- Father: Mark Anthony Fernandez
- Relatives: Rudy Fernandez (grandfather); Alma Moreno (grandmother); Vandolph Quizon (uncle); Renz Fernandez (uncle); Ralph Fernandez (uncle); Winwyn Marquez (aunt); Gregorio Fernandez (great-grandfather); Padilla family (distant relatives)
- Musical career
- Label: Star Music (2014–present)

Grace Cameron Garcia Fernandez (born November 7, 2001) is a Filipino actor, singer, and dancer. He is best known as one of the vocalists of Star Magic's boy-group Gimme 5.

== Early life and education ==
Fernandez was born on November 7, 2001, in Manila, Philippines. He is the eldest son of actor Mark Anthony Fernandez and wife Melissa Garcia Fernandez. His younger brother is Rudolf Venedictos Garcia Fernandez.

He belongs to one of the most prominent clans in showbiz. He is the great-grandson of actor Gregorio Fernandez, who married Pilar Padilla from the Padilla family, another clan of actors. He is the grandson of action icon, Rudy Fernandez and actress-politician, Alma Moreno. He is also the nephew of Vandolph Quizon, Renz Fernandez, Ralph Fernandez and Winwyn Marquez.

Fernandez is the nephew of Rommel Padilla's sons (Daniel and RJ Padilla), Robin Padilla's daughters (his 3 daughters and 1 son to former wife Liezl Sicangco) which are Kylie, Queenie, Zhen-Zhen, and Ali Padilla, and to actress-reporter Erika Padilla.

He took a break from showbiz to study film and drama acting in New York (graduating from the Stella Adler Studio) before returning to focus on mature, dramatic roles.

== Acting career ==
Fernandez first appeared on TV in a 2013 Jollibee Summer Bucket Treats commercial. He made his television debut on the ABS-CBN game show Minute To Win It – Junior Edition which was then hosted by Luis Manzano.

In December 2013, Fernandez joined the boy-group Gimme 5 – a band formed by ABS-CBN's Star Magic along with Nash Aguas as leader, Joaquin Lucas Reyes, Brace Henry Arquiza and John Emmanuel Bermundo. They were introduced on ASAP wherein the band performed The Wanted's, Glad You Came.

Gimme 5 released their self-titled debut album in November 2014 under Star Music. The track list of the all-original, pop-rock album includes "Pag Kasama Ka", "Aking Prinsesa", "Hey Girl", "Growing Up", "Ikaw Na Na" and its carrier single "Hatid Sundo". The following year, the group held a series of TV guestings and mall shows to promote their album. The group kicked off their "Gimme5 Best Summer Ever" album tour a few weeks ago.

In August 2014, Fernandez started his acting career as a cast member of "Perfecto" an episode in fantasy-drama, comedy anthology Wansapanataym which is produced and aired by ABS-CBN every Saturdays and Sundays. He was later on cast as supporting character in the teen drama TV series, Bagito.

Fernandez was then cast in a special participation as one of the young characters in the 2015 Primetime TV series Bridges of Love. He played Manuel "JR" Nakpil JR/Carlos Antonio (later portrayed by Paulo Avelino) a hopeful high school student who sells cigarettes at night. Fernandez stirred everyone's curiosity about the boy who rose from the slums when Baron Geisler's character adopted him. He was subsequently cast as a supporting character in the remake version of Primetime TV series Pangako Sa 'Yo as Jonathan "Egoy" Mobido originally by Patrick Garcia. He appeared in Book 1 as the love interest of Lia Buenavista played by Andrea Brillantes.

In August 2015, Fernandez made his film debut as one of the supporting cast in a certified box-office hit movie The Love Affair top-billed by Richard Gomez, Dawn Zulueta and Bea Alonzo. In the film, he played the role of Timmy the youngest child of Vince and Trisha.

In the 2024, political crime thriller series Pamilya Sagrado, Fernandez performed as Justin R. Sagrado, a main antagonist turned anti-hero.

== Other ventures ==
=== Film Studies and Theater Training in New York ===
Driven by a passion for the technical and creative aspects behind the camera, Grae took a temporary break from Philippine showbiz in 2022 to study film and acting in New York City. He underwent intense professional development and successfully graduated from the two-year evening conservatory program at the prestigious Stella Adler Studio of Acting. This venture allowed him to hone his craft from a global perspective, focusing on artistic depth rather than just commercial appeal.

== Acting credits ==
=== Film ===
Key
†	Denotes films that have not yet been released

Grae Fernandez's film credits with year of release, film titles and roles
Year	Title	Role
2015	The Love Affair	Timmy Ramos
2019	Spark	Drei

=== Television ===
Key
†	Denotes shows that have not yet been released

Grae Fernandez's television credits with year of release, television titles and roles
Year	Title	Role	Ref.
2014	Wansapanataym: Perfecto	Carlo	
2014–2025	ASAP	Himself / Performer	
2015	Bagito	Carlo	
2015	Luv U	Carter	
2015	Bridges of Love	Manuel"JR"Nakpil Jr./ Young Carlos Antonio	
2015–2016	Pangako Sa 'Yo	Jonathan "Egoy" Mobido	
2016	Home Sweetie Home	Jepoy	
2016	Ipaglaban Mo: Kabataan	Andrew	
2016	FPJ's Ang Probinsyano	young Eric Maniego	
2017	Wansapanataym: Louie's Biton	Louie Mendrez	
2017–2018	Ikaw Lang Ang Iibigin	Joselito "Jay-jay" Agbayani Jr.	
2018	Funny Ka, Pare Ko	Grae	
2018	Spirits Reawaken	Red	
2019	Hiwaga ng Kambat	Mateo Baron	
2019–2020	Starla	George	
2020–2021	Ang sa Iyo ay Akin	Jake P. Zulyani	
2023–2024	Senior High	Yosef Rosales	
2024	Pamilya Sagrado	Justin R. Sagrado	
2024	Rainbow Rumble	Himself / Contestant	

== Accolades ==
Year	Award-giving body	Category	Nominated work	Result	Ref.
2015	46th GMMSF Box-Office Entertainment Awards	Most Promising Recording/Performing Group	Gimme 5	Won	
2016	Myx Music Awards	Favorite Group	Gimme 5	Nominated	
2024	2024 TAG Awards Chicago	Best Supporting Actor / Best of Kontrabida	Pamilya Sagrado	Won	
