= Pamilya Ko =

Philippine television drama series

- Title card
- Genre: Family; Melodrama
- Created by: Mel Mendoza-del Rosario
- Written by: Mary Rose Colindres; Jaja Amarillo; Cyrus Dan Cañares; Jaymar Santos Castro; Anie Domingo Abad
- Directed by: Raymund B. Ocampo; Paco Sta. Maria
- Starring: Sylvia Sanchez; JM de Guzman; Arci Muñoz; Joey Marquez
- Opening theme: "Home" by Erik Santos
- Composer: Charles Emmanuel Smalls
- Country of origin: Philippines
- Original language: Filipino
- No. of seasons: 1
- No. of episodes: 135

Production
- Executive producers: Ruel Santos Bayani; Rizza Gonzales Ebriega; Jayson Aracap Tabigue
- Producer: Mavic Holgado-Oducayen
- Production locations: Marikina, Philippines; Antipolo, Philippines; Quezon City, Philippines
- Editors: Alexces Megan Abarquez; Shyra Joaquin
- Running time: 30-45 minutes
- Production company: RGE Drama Unit

Original release
- Network: ABS-CBN
- Release: September 9, 2019 – March 13, 2020

Pamilya Ko (transl. My Family) is a Philippine television drama series broadcast by ABS-CBN. Directed by Raymund B. Ocampo, it stars Sylvia Sanchez, JM de Guzman, Arci Muñoz and Joey Marquez. It aired on the network's Primetime Bida line up and worldwide on TFC from September 9, 2019 to March 13, 2020, replacing Minute to Win It: Last Man Standing.

== History ==
Pamilya Ko was aired on ABS-CBN's Primetime Bida evening block every weeknights at 5:45 P.M. from September 9, 2019 to March 13, 2020 for a total of 135 episodes. Due to the enhanced community quarantine in Luzon caused by the COVID-19 pandemic in the Philippines, the drama was put on halt and was replaced by reruns of 100 Days to Heaven beginning March 16, 2020 (later moved to afternoon lineup) and Meteor Garden (2018) from May 4 until the network's shutdown on May 5.

=== Timeslot block ===
It was the last early-evening drama series to be produced by the network before the COVID-19 pandemic and its shutdown in May 2020.

=== COVID-19 pandemic ===
On March 31, 2020, Sylvia Sanchez and her husband Art Atayde tested positive for COVID-19.

=== Cancellation ===
Pamilya Ko, along with Make It with You cancelled their production on June 13, 2020. This happened a month after the ABS-CBN ceased its free-to-air broadcast operations on May 5, 2020, due to the cease and desist order issued by the National Telecommunications Commission (NTC) and Solicitor General Jose Calida. Meanwhile, Pamilya Ko production manager Mavic Holgado-Oducayen died on July 22, 2020 due to heart attack after the House of Representatives denied the new franchise for ABS-CBN.

== Cast and characters ==
Main cast

- JM de Guzman as Francisco "Chico" C. Mabunga
- Arci Muñoz as Elizabeth "Betty" Palisoc
- Joey Marquez as Fernando "Fernan" P. Mabunga
- Sylvia Sanchez as Luzviminda "Luz" Ramirez-Mabunga
- Rosanna Roces as Elena Carbonell-Lombardi
- Irma Adlawan as Loida Magtulis

Supporting cast

- Alyssa Muhlach as Dr. Sophia "Pia" J. dela Paz
- Kiko Estrada as Bernardo "Beri" R. Mabunga
- Maris Racal as Peachy Ann R. Mabunga
- Jairus Aquino as Percival "Persi" R. Mabunga
- Mutya Orquia as Cherry Luz R. Mabunga
- Raikko Mateo as Paul John "Pongky" R. Mabunga
- Kira Balinger as Lemon Jane R. Mabunga
- Kid Yambao as Apollo "Apol" R. Mabunga
- Perla Bautista as Caridad "Caring" Potenciano-Mabunga
- Kit Thompson as James Carvajal / Ferdie Quisumbing
- Joe Vargas as Boljak
- VJ Mendoza as Daks
- Peter Serrano as Richie Mabanta
- Marco Gallo as Stefano C. Lombardi

Guest cast

- Noel Trinidad as Joselito "Jose" Mabunga
- CX Navarro as young Chico
- Andrez del Rosario as Joaquin "Jack" R. Mabunga
- Miko Raval as Charles Ruiz
- Dominic Roque as David Lardizabal
- Boom Labrusca as Dr. Sofronio dela Paz
- Anne Feo as Regina Jurado-dela Paz
- Micah Muñoz as Atty. Raul Malvar
- Jeffrey Santos as Insp. Jose Rivas
- Shoichi Oka as Ryu Mori
- Glenda Garcia as Ma. Asuncion "Azon" Ramirez-Cummings
- Frances Makil-Ignacio as Marny
- Miguel Faustmann as Carlitos "Carlos" Quisumbing
- Bobby Andrews as young Carlos
- Maricel Morales as Corazon Quisumbing
- Elora Españo as young Loida
- Heaven Peralejo as Ma. Corrine Patricia "Macopa" de Jesus
- JC de Vera as Nathaniel "Nathan" Rubiñol
- Sunshine Garcia as Merceditas "Mercy" Alvarez
- DJ Durano as Antonio "Tonio" Alvarez
- Nathalie Hart as Christina "Tina" Rubiñol

== Episodes ==
Season	Episodes	Originally released	
Season	Episodes	First released	Last released
1	135	September 9, 2019	March 13, 2020

No. overall	No. in season	Title	Original release date	Kantar Media Ratings (nationwide)
1	1	"Mabunga ang Pamilya Ko"	September 9, 2019	18.3%
2	2	"Picture Frame ng Pamilya Ko"	September 10, 2019	16.6%
3	3	"Regalo Para sa Pamilya Ko"	September 11, 2019	17.1%
4	4	"Luksa ng Pamilya Ko"	September 12, 2019	19.1%
5	5	"Tinik sa Pamilya Ko"	September 13, 2019	17.2%
6	6	"Lihim ng Pamilya Ko"	September 16, 2019	18.3%
7	7	"Madiskarte"	September 17, 2019	18.8%
8	8	"Utang"	September 18, 2019	18.8%
9	9	"Kayod"	September 19, 2019	18.3%
10	10	"Swerte"	September 20, 2019	16.5%
11	11	"Oportunidad"	September 23, 2019	19.0%
12	12	"Tiwala"	September 24, 2019	19.7%
13	13	"Rescue"	September 25, 2019	17.8%
14	14	"Leksyon"	September 26, 2019	17.5%
15	15	"Plano"	September 27, 2019	17.7%
16	16	"Fruit Stand"	September 30, 2019	19.0%
17	17	"Suporta"	October 1, 2019	20.3%
18	18	"Pagkakataon"	October 2, 2019	17.7%
19	19	"Kutob"	October 3, 2019	17.1%
20	20	"Suhol"	October 4, 2019	17.0%
21	21	"Preparasyon"	October 7, 2019	17.9%
22	22	"Selebrasyon"	October 8, 2019	19.0%
23	23	"Bisita"	October 9, 2019	18.6%
24	24	"Suspetsa"	October 10, 2019	20.1%
25	25	"Katanungan"	October 11, 2019	18.9%
26	26	"Dahilan"	October 14, 2019	20.3%
27	27	"Pundidong Ilaw"	October 15, 2019	20.1%
28	28	"Katotohanan"	October 16, 2019	20.7%
29	29	"Ulan"	October 17, 2019	22.2%
30	30	"Kasalanan"	October 18, 2019	20.0%
31	31	"Epekto"	October 21, 2019	21.1%
32	32	"Resulta"	October 22, 2019	21.2%
33	33	"Responsibilidad"	October 23, 2019	17.9%
34	34	"Emosyon"	October 24, 2019	20.2%
35	35	"Harapan"	October 25, 2019	21.2%
36	36	"Supalpal"	October 28, 2019	19.8%
37	37	"Magnanakaw"	October 29, 2019	20.8%
38	38	"Mang-aagaw"	October 30, 2019	21.9%
39	39	"Family Day"	October 31, 2019	21.5%
40	40	"Souvenir"	November 1, 2019	18.2%
41	41	"Sikreto"	November 4, 2019	21.8%
42	42	"Pag-asa"	November 5, 2019	22.5%
43	43	"Kuya Chico"	November 6, 2019	23.5%
44	44	"Pag-amin"	November 7, 2019	23.0%
45	45	"Pagkatao"	November 8, 2019	21.5%
46	46	"Pag-Uwi"	November 11, 2019	21.6%
47	47	"Agawan"	November 12, 2019	21.1%
48	48	"Pagkilala"	November 13, 2019	21.3%
49	49	"Kaarawan"	November 14, 2019	24.6%
50	50	"Trahedya"	November 15, 2019	23.0%
51	51	"Panalangin"	November 18, 2019	20.0%
52	52	"Paggising"	November 19, 2019	19.9%
53	53	"Tahanan"	November 20, 2019	20.7%
54	54	"Tatak"	November 21, 2019	21.1%
55	55	"Bagabag"	November 22, 2019	19.7%
56	56	"Desisyon"	November 25, 2019	21.9%
57	57	"Espiya"	November 26, 2019	20.6%
58	58	"Huli"	November 27, 2019	17.9%
59	59	"Bantay"	November 28, 2019	20.0%
60	60	"Depresyon"	November 29, 2019	19.9%
61	61	"Imbestiga"	December 2, 2019	19.2%
62	62	"Huling Huli"	December 3, 2019	17.4%
63	63	"Bistado"	December 4, 2019	15.9%
64	64	"Arestado"	December 5, 2019	16.2%
65	65	"Kulungan"	December 6, 2019	15.3%
66	66	"Pagiwas"	December 9, 2019	15.1%
67	67	"Panganib"	December 10, 2019	15.3%
68	68	"Basag na Ilaw"	December 11, 2019	16.7%
69	69	"Laban, Nanay Luz"	December 12, 2019	18.1%
70	70	"Bintang"	December 13, 2019	16.8%
71	71	"Naiipit"	December 16, 2019	17.7%
72	72	"Solid Mabunga"	December 17, 2019	15.6%
73	73	"Matatag"	December 18, 2019	16.3%
74	74	"Simbang Gabi"	December 19, 2019	15.7%
75	75	"Christmas Feels"	December 20, 2019	16.3%
76	76	"Regalo"	December 23, 2019	14.4%
77	77	"Pag-ibig"	December 24, 2019	13.1%
78	78	"Is Forever"	December 25, 2019	12.9%
79	79	"Proposal"	December 26, 2019	13.6%
80	80	"Buntis"	December 27, 2019	12.8%
81	81	"Bagong Taon"	December 30, 2019	13.5%
82	82	"Dignidad"	December 31, 2019	10.5%
83	83	"Tulungan"	January 1, 2020	13.8%
84	84	"Tunay na Ligaya"	January 2, 2020	16.2%
85	85	"Sumpaan"	January 3, 2020	15.6%
86	86	"Bagong Yugto"	January 6, 2020	14.5%
87	87	"Duda"	January 7, 2020	14.6%
88	88	"Selos"	January 8, 2020	15.5%
89	89	"Tsansa"	January 9, 2020	16.3%
90	90	"Dalang Panganib"	January 10, 2020	14.2%
91	91	"Kasinungalingan"	January 13, 2020	17.0%
92	92	"Damay"	January 14, 2020	16.9%
93	93	"Pakitang Tao"	January 15, 2020	16.1%
94	94	"Biro"	January 16, 2020	15.5%
95	95	"Sugal"	January 17, 2020	16.0%
96	96	"Relasyon"	January 20, 2020	13.8%
97	97	"Panggap"	January 21, 2020	12.4%
98	98	"Problema"	January 22, 2020	14.9%
99	99	"Kapit Patalim"	January 23, 2020	13.9%
100	100	"Planado"	January 24, 2020	16.3%
101	101	"Peke"	January 27, 2020	18.1%
102	102	"Pagtago"	January 28, 2020	15.6%
103	103	"Bilanggo"	January 29, 2020	13.6%
104	104	"Laban Lang"	January 30, 2020	14.9%
105	105	"Pagbitaw"	January 31, 2020	15.4%
106	106	"Pigil"	February 3, 2020	13.8%
107	107	"Paninira"	February 4, 2020	14.7%
108	108	"Komplikado"	February 5, 2020	14.0%
109	109	"PeaNat Lagot"	February 6, 2020	18.5%
110	110	"Broken Heart"	February 7, 2020	17.0%
111	111	"Eskandalo"	February 10, 2020	17.2%
112	112	"Sad PeaNat"	February 11, 2020	13.8%
113	113	"Buyo"	February 12, 2020	14.4%
114	114	"Sugod"	February 13, 2020	14.1%
115	115	"Pagpapalaki"	February 14, 2020	13.7%
116	116	"Sayong Mundo"	February 17, 2020	18.2%
117	117	"Happy Birthday, Peachy!"	February 18, 2020	15.3%
118	118	"Finding Ferdie"	February 19, 2020	14.7%
119	119	"Who is Ferdie?"	February 20, 2020	14.6%
120	120	"Where is Betty?"	February 21, 2020	14.4%
121	121	"Gants"	February 24, 2020	19.0%
122	122	"Bye Betty"	February 25, 2020	12.5%
123	123	"Takot"	February 26, 2020	13.1%
124	124	"Chico vs. Ferdie"	February 27, 2020	15.5%
125	125	"Pray for Chico"	February 28, 2020	12.9%
126	126	"Loida is Back"	March 2, 2020	13.3%
127	127	"Buhay o Dignidad"	March 3, 2020	13.1%
128	128	"Kapit Mabunga"	March 4, 2020	14.6%
129	129	"Walang Sukuan"	March 5, 2020	15.4%
130	130	"Tagu Taguan"	March 6, 2020	12.5%
131	131	"Padre de Pamilya"	March 9, 2020	13.7%
132	132	"Pagkabuwag"	March 10, 2020	13.0%
133	133	"Lipat Bahay"	March 11, 2020	12.7%
134	134	"New Beginnings"	March 12, 2020	13.2%
135	135	"New Chances"	March 13, 2020	14.1%

== Ratings ==
Kantar Media National TV Ratings (5:45 PM PST)
Pilot Episode	Finale Episode	Peak	Average
18.3% September 9, 2019	14.1% March 13, 2020	24.6% November 14, 2019	17.2%

== Awards and nominations ==
Awards and Nomination
Year	Award giving body	Category	Nominated Artist	Nominated work	Results
2021	34th PMPC Star Awards for TV	Best Primetime TV Series	Pamilya Ko	—N/a	Won
2021	34th PMPC Star Awards for TV 2021	Best Drama Actress	Pamilya Ko	Sylvia Sanchez	Won
2021	34th PMPC Star Awards for TV 2021	Best Drama Actor	Pamilya Ko	JM de Guzman	Won
2021	34th PMPC Star Awards for TV 2021	Best Drama Supporting Actress	Pamilya Ko	Irma Adlawan	Nominated
2021	34th PMPC Star Awards for TV 2021	Best Child Performer	Pamilya Ko	Raikko Mateo	Nominated

== See also ==
- List of programs broadcast by ABS-CBN
- List of ABS-CBN drama series
