= Beach Bros =

2022 Philippine television series

- Second official poster
- Genre: Coming-of-age; Romantic comedy Drama
- Written by: Andrian Legaspi; Allan Cuadra
- Directed by: Victor Kaiba Villanueva
- Starring: Kyle Echarri; Brent Manalo; Raven Rigor; Sean Tristan; Lance Carr; Chie Filomeno; Kira Balinger; Angelica Lao
- Music by: Ammie Ruth Suarez
- Opening theme: "Life's A Beach" by Jeremy G & Nameless Kids
- Composers: Jeremy Glinoga, Kyle Perry, Rox Santos, and Jonathan Manalo
- Country of origin: Philippines
- Original languages: Filipino; English
- No. of episodes: 6

Production
- Executive producers: Carlo L. Katigbak; Cory V. Vidanes; Roldeo T. Endrinal; Jamie C. Lopez; Ginny Monteagudo-Ocampo
- Producer: Cathy Magdael-Abarrondo
- Production location: Baler, Aurora
- Editors: Glenn Lumba; Levi Ligon
- Running time: 30 minutes
- Production company: Dreamscape Entertainment

Original release
- Network: iWantTFC
- Release: July 16 – July 31, 2022

Beach Bros is a Philippine comedy drama streaming television miniseries directed by Victor Kaiba Villanueva, which premiered from July 16 to 31, 2022 on iWantTFC.

== Premise ==
Dave, Billy, Jason, Pete, and Jeremy live in Baler, Aurora. Dave plans to study in Manila while his mother works to support his education. After an accident, Dave meets Nicole, a tourist. Nicole's presence in Baler affects Dave's feelings toward her and impacts the relationships among the group.

== Cast and characters ==
=== Main cast ===
Baler Boys

- Kyle Echarri as Dave Alon, the mischievous leader of the gang aspiring to get educated in Manila
- Lance Justin Carr as Billy Alon, the jester of the gang
- Brent Manalo as Jason Coral, a gregarious partygoing friend from Manila
- Raven Rigor as Pete Resureccion, a racketeering waiter who is a pastor's child
- Sean Tristan as Jeremy Marvista, an aspiring vlogger with 30 subscribers

Girls around the Boys

- Chie Filomeno as Nicole Solana, a sexy tourist from Manila who has a mission to fulfill in Baler
- Kira Balinger as Erika Aguador, a school valedictorian and the only child of a local politician
- Angelica Lao as Yasmin Viaje, a perky tour guide aspiring to get educated in Manila

=== Supporting cast ===
- Malou de Guzman as Chona, Dave and Paulo's mother
- Ian de Leon as Vladimir, leader of the Black Snakes syndicate
- Jason Gainza as Pete's pastor-father
- JC Santos as Paulo, Dave's late older brother and Nicole's late boyfriend
- Jeffrey Santos as Konsi Michael, a local politician in Baler
- Adrian Lindayag as Candy, Billy's gay sibling managing the Beach Bros Bar
- Ryan Rems as Greg, Billy's weird-acting brother working at the Beach Bros Bar
- Yesh Burce as Stacy, Vladimir's accomplice who is tasked to follow Nicole's activities in Baler

== Production ==
First official poster

=== Casting ===
As reported by the Philippine Star, this is Echarri's first leading role in a series as he had been paired with Francine Diaz in some of ABS-CBN's drama projects and with The Gold Squad previously. This is also the first series for Echarri and Filomeno as a pair, where the two were part of the Celebrity Edition of Pinoy Big Brother: Kumunity Season 10 in 2021.

=== Marketing ===
A teaser was released on June 21, 2022, while the full trailer was released on June 28, 2022, via iWantTFC's social media channels with its release date scheduled on July 16, 2022. On July 3, 2022, Echarri and Filomeno led the casts in gracing the ASAP Natin 'To stage with Rigor, Manalo, Carr, and Lao as part of the Beach Bros promotion.

=== Release ===
New episodes were released Saturdays and Sundays.

=== Broadcast ===
The series premiered on July 16 to 31, 2022, on iWantTFC.

The series had its TV Premiere from March 18 to April 2, 2023, on the Yes Weekend primetime block on Kapamilya Channel, Kapamilya Online Live and A2Z replacing The Goodbye Girl and it was replaced by My Sunset Girl.
