= The Good Son (TV series) =

2017 Philippine drama television series

- Title card
- Genre: Family drama; Melodrama; Mystery; Crime
- Created by: Rondel P. Lindayag
- Developed by: ABS-CBN Studios
- Written by: Danica Mae S. Domingo; David Franche Diuco; Detrick Saberola; Li Candelaria; Hazel Madanguit; Ma. Nica Romero
- Directed by: Emmanuel Q. Palo; Andoy L. Ranay; Jerome C. Pobocan
- Creative director: Johnny delos Santos
- Starring: Joshua Garcia; Jerome Ponce; McCoy de Leon; Nash Aguas
- Opening theme: "I'll Be There for You" by Jake Zyrus
- Composers: Martin Nievera; Louie Ocampo
- Country of origin: Philippines
- Original language: Filipino
- No. of episodes: 143 (list of episodes)

Production
- Executive producers: Carlo Katigbak; Cory Vidanes; Laurenti Dyogi; Roldeo Endrinal; Eleanor Martinez
- Producer: Arnel T. Nacario
- Cinematography: Gary Tria; Romy Vitug
- Editors: Marion Reyes; Ron Joseph Ilagan; Ceazara Terrado; Dennis Austria; Princess Orveen Calderon; Cary Steve Hen Ganado
- Running time: 30–38 minutes
- Production company: Dreamscape Entertainment Television

Original release
- Network: ABS-CBN
- Release: September 25, 2017 – April 13, 2018

The Good Son is a Philippine television drama crime series broadcast by ABS-CBN. Directed by Emmanuel Q. Palo, Andoy L. Ranay and Jerome C. Pobocan, it stars Joshua Garcia, Jerome Ponce, McCoy de Leon, and Nash Aguas. It aired on the network's Primetime Bida line up and worldwide on TFC from September 25, 2017 to April 13, 2018, replacing A Love to Last, and was replaced by Since I Found You.

Originally titled as Kung Kailangan Mo Ako, the murder mystery addresses issues affecting family relationships such as infidelity, mental illness, particularly schizophrenia and pathological lying.

== Plot ==
This mystery, family drama revolves around Victor Buenavidez (Albert Martinez), a good father to his sons, Enzo (Jerome Ponce) and Calvin (Nash Aguas), carrying a secret: another son, Joseph Reyes (later changed to Buenavidez) (Joshua Garcia). Joseph and his half brother Obet (McCoy de Leon) grow up fatherless, each from a different father. Victor returns to Joseph's life and things are starting to get better for their family, but Victor dies suddenly in Joseph's home. The two families collide, shocking their two sons and devastating Olivia Buenavidez (Eula Valdez), Victor's widow. Olivia turns her anger on Raquel (Mylene Dizon), Joseph's mother, and blames her for her husband's untimely death.

The autopsy reveals poison in Victor's system, his death turns into a homicide investigation. Olivia quickly points the blame on the Reyes family. Victor's Will further complicates matters when Joseph and Raquel are named co-heirs with the first family, with Joseph receiving equal shares as his two other brothers, Enzo and Calvin. The will stipulates Joseph must complete his education in the same private school as his brothers, and upon graduating university, share in the management of the company with Enzo. Aside from a lump sum bequest, Raquel is also given a seat in the board.

The investigation intensifies as suspicions shift from Joseph and Raquel to Calvin and Olivia. While the siblings try to deal with the new family dynamics, Olivia continues to cast aspersions on the Reyes family, specifically Raquel and Joseph. Joseph pursues his own investigation and discovers leads which he provides the police, further angering Olivia.

As clashes between both families escalate in the school campus and the boardroom, the investigation leads to Dado Castillo (Jeric Raval), the Buenavidez family driver. Dado and Olivia grew up together despite the fact that Dado's father was their servant. As children, Olivia leaned on Dado as her protector against her father's harsh disciplinary upbringing. He falls in love with her but she marries Victor. In one moment of weakness, when Victor and Olivia's marriage is under a lot of strain, Olivia and Dado spend the night together and Calvin is conceived. Victor learns the truth when Dado secretly leaks the DNA result on his desk bureau for him to find, information that sparked his and Olivia's separation.

The discovery of their mother's affair and Calvin's paternity devastate the boys, while the lies and coverups intensifies. The coverup attempts lead to Chief investigator SPO1 Colminares' murder by Dado, creating an enormous impact on Calvin's mental state and he further regresses into Psychosis.

As Joseph's investigation leads him closer to the truth, Olivia pressures Dado to kill Joseph. When Dado is captured, he confesses to the assault and attempted murder of the Reyeses, the murder of SP01 Colmenares (Michael Rivero) and admits to poisoning Victor. The police are skeptical because they have concrete evidence that Dado had an accomplice who Colmenares struggled with before he died. Their suspicions come from hair samples obtained from Colmenares' hands when he died. DNA tests conclude the hair strands are not Dado's, but its DNA has an 89.7% chance that the hair belongs to his relative. Hazel (Loisa Andalio) is eliminated because she is adopted. While all these are happening, Olivia attempts to flee to America with her sons to start a new life. A departure hold is placed against her and they are detained just before they board. She is arrested for trying to abscond with company funds and Estafa charges are filed against her by BDG ("Buenavidez de Guzman Group").

The departure hold affects Calvin the hardest as his mental state deteriorates even further and his schizophrenic personalities begin to emerge. He hears voices in his head, warnings that the truth will destroy him. Enzo's concern for Calvin increases and promises to be there for his brother but he is conflicted when he discovers more lies from his mother, her embezzlement of BDG funds. He wants to reach out to Hazel but is torn between covering up his family's secrets, or doing the right thing and get help for his brother. Calvin's psychiatrist strongly recommends confinement in a psych facilities for his psychotic episodes.

At Olivia's Estafa trial, the court hears testimony from Randy Villamanca, BDG's former head of finance, attesting that he has been diverting company funds to Olivia's offshore accounts under her specific instructions. But his testimony is questioned when the funds are missing from her secret offshore account. Just when it looks like Olivia's careful lies unravel, the unthinkable happens when the court grants her a not guilty verdict for lack of evidence. Olivia's lawyers point out there is no evidence that proves Olivia received the funds. While Olivia dodges a bullet, Anthony (John Estrada) and Ernesto (Art Acuña) appeal the verdict. Strangely, Anthony instructs Villamanca to hide.

Despite Olivia's courtroom triumphs, Calvin's mental health quickly deteriorates, his paranoia pushes him to break into Anthony's home. Anthony and Joseph catch him and after a violent altercation with Joseph, turn him over to authorities. This time, police focus on Calvin's alibi, Justine (Alexa Ilacad), threatening her with possible charges of obstruction of justice. Not wanting to drag her into all this, Calvin admits the truth about the evening Colmenares was murdered. He is jailed overnight as an accomplice for murder and obstruction of justice but released on bail the next day.

Calvin breaks down at his pre-hearing, prompting a motion for a court appointed psychiatrist to determine if Calvin is competent to stand trial. Olivia finally admits to Enzo that Calvin poisoned his father to stop him from leaving their family. The next day, Calvin confesses the same truth to the court appointed psychiatrist. The explosive information sends the entire extended family reeling. Olivia looks to Dado and Arthur to fix her problems - two persons personally invested in Olivia's triumph. Dado tells Olivia that he would testify that he stopped Calvin from serving the poison when he purposely spilled the contents of the glass. Meanwhile, Arthur, who has his own score to settle with Anthony, accepts Olivia's payment to find the stolen company funds from Anthony and bring down his rival.

Later, Anthony becomes the new person of interest. Olivia tracks Villamanca hiding in a safe house arranged by Anthony Buenavidez, but escapes. Police investigators review CCTV footage and learn that Anthony and Victor had an argument in their office the evening of his death, after the birthday dinner and before Victor headed for the Reyes. Unfortunately, Anthony and Villamanca are missing. Joseph and Raquel struggle to comprehend the latest developments regarding Anthony and find it hard to believe that he killed Victor. But soon after Anthony is officially named a suspect in his brother's murder, the police investigation goes into a tailspin when Anthony is found dead. Solving Victor's death is far from over as twist after twist occur and persons or interest are murdered. A new lead investigator is brought in to bring a third eye into the investigation. Meanwhile, Dado attempts to take matters in his own hands and kidnaps Calvin, a situation that forces Olivia to join him in a remote rural island in the province outside Manila where they live as a family. Their disappearance alarms Matilda (Olivia's mother) who subsequently has a stroke. There are no sightings of the trio, but Calvin calls Justine from time to time and tells her he is happy and peaceful in his new surroundings. Olivia's unwillingness to seek help from the authorities raises suspicions with Enzo and Joseph.

While authorities continue to search for them, BDG struggles financially as stockholders try to pull out. Nonetheless, Raquel convinces them to give her franchise concept a chance to work. In two months, the company is back on its feet. The franchise model takes off, saving BDG from bankruptcy, once again gaining the confidence from its stockholders. Ernesto successfully sells the idle agricultural land that had weighed heavily on the company's neck, selling it profitably under a rezoned commercial property, further adding financial value to the company. In just two months, BDG's financial hemorrhage caused by Olivia's siphoning stopped under Raquel's and Ernesto's able guardianship. BDG is back on its feet, emerging even richer than before. But just as the company recovers, another tragedy strikes while the company celebrates a thanksgiving dinner with their clients and employees.

Back at the Island, Olivia and Calvin escape from Dado, immediately contacting Enzo. Entangled in her web of lies, she refuses to go to the police, a covert maneuver to impede exposure. Instead, they rush into the company thanksgiving party, where Dado, who had been following them, unleashes his fury at the crowd, shooting innocent guests. Raquel attempts to bring Calvin to safety, ending up at the rooftop of the building. Both Enzo and Joseph try to disarm Dado but he overcomes the two brothers. As Raquel and Olivia run to help their sons, Dado pushes Raquel over the edge of the building. Joseph tries to hold on to Raquel but her hand slips and she falls to her death. Dado escapes with Calvin.

When the authorities pursue both Dado and Calvin at the ferry boat, a furious Arthur catches up and shoots him. Dado falls into the ocean, his body is never retrieved and Calvin wanders away. Always the chronic liar, Olivia uses her self-inflicted wounds to describe abuse under the hands of Dado, a story the authorities and Enzo don't believe. Enzo suspects his mother knows the truth about his father's murder, and that Dado holds that secret over her head. Joseph has similar suspicions and reports it to the police: all of them at the rooftop heard Dado threaten to expose the truth about Olivia if she and Calvin didn't go with him.

Raquel's death places a tremendous strain on Joseph and Obet's psyche. Consumed with guilt over his failure to save her, Joseph's anger clouds his good heart. Obet is filled with rage at the Buenavidezes, towards his brother and is led further astray by his father, fueling their desire for revenge. Enzo recognizes his mother's lies as the root of it all, and asks her how any resolution could occur if she can't face the truth. He wonders if protecting his family is the right thing to do.

=== Finale ===
Raquel's death triggers a series of events that further pit the families against each other. Without Raquel's moral compass, particularly for her wayward son, Obet, the two boys are consumed with anger, cast adrift in an ocean of revenge, its currents controlled by a mentally ill Olivia. Grandfather Matias is helpless and his efforts to guide them is in vain. Joseph has an ugly physical confrontation with Olivia when she expresses her intention to return to BDG. Likewise, Obet continues on his trajectory towards his father's criminal path. Aside from purchasing a hand gun, Obet violently assaults Olivia outside her home. Things all come to a head when he threatens to push Matilda from the top of the hospital exit stairwell, leading to his arrest. Although the fiscal throws out the case for lack of probable cause, Arthur decides he has nothing to lose by revealing to the authorities his own bombshell: he colluded with Olivia to interfere with the investigation, that Olivia engaged his services not once but twice: first time was to lie about Raquel and implicate her in Victor's death which he refused, and the second time was to obtain evidence that she could use against Anthony in which he got paid. A pathological liar, Olivia admits to the meetings but quickly asserts that Arthur was extorting her.

Meanwhile, the Reyeses and the Buenavidezes receive threatening anonymous notes and suspect it is coming from Dado. Panicked over what Dado can divulge to all, Olivia searches for him. Still missing and without his medication, Calvin begins to lose touch with reality, his mind going back to the trauma of his father's death. He speaks of being wrongfully blamed for the poisoning, where in fact he claims there were two people who worked together to kill his father.

Tired of his mother's lies and the never ending hate, Enzo decides he will fight for the only thing he has: his father's legacy. Embarking on his own investigation, he starts in Anthony's home searching for any paper trail that would lead him to his uncle's last steps and shed light on what really happened to him, and why. Finding the truth and exposing it could permanently destroy his family or heal it.

Joseph, on the other hand, is close to unmasking the perpetrators. His idea to send anonymous notes to Olivia works. Panicked and fearful of exposure by Dado, she is followed by Joseph and leads him to Calvin. Calvin has a moment of clarity and discovers his dad's real killer. He contacts Justine to tell her he will warn his father of the killers’ plans. Justine alerts Enzo who rushes to Calvin's location ("at our dad's safe place") accompanied by Olivia but Calvin is fearful of them and runs away. Joseph, following Olivia, arrives to help but another altercation between Enzo and Joseph allows Calvin to slip away once more.

Joseph eventually finds Calvin and brings him into sanctuary in a convent. Determined to unnerve Olivia, he sends her another anonymous note claiming he has Calvin, further rattling Olivia who thinks it is Dado. Meanwhile, Olivia finds Villamanca and roughs him up who eventually gives her access to the funds which Anthony had instructed to transfer back to Victor's company for his three sons to inherit. Olivia prepares to retrieve the missing funds!

Believing she is at the home stretch, Olivia arranges to leave the country with her sons and mother as soon as she finds Calvin. Elsewhere at the ocean, fishermen find Dado's corpse, dead from gunshot wounds sustained from Arthur's attack.

Now suspecting that Joseph is sending the notes, Enzo and Obet follows him to the convent and a violent confrontation ensues culminating with a near tragic ending. Joseph saves Obet and Enzo from plunging to their deaths and the near death shakes them. The siblings realize their mistakes and iron out their differences, as they discover the awful truth about Olivia: in a recorded conversation between Olivia and Dado, the brothers hear her admitting she poisoned Victor and planned to hide behind Calvin's illness. Realizing that Olivia manipulated everything in her twisted and mentally ill mind, they decide to flush out their mother. Used to her expert manipulation to get away with murder, Enzo turns himself in as bait, an act that shakes Olivia's core, but does not admit anything. Despite Enzo's false confession to the authorities and risk to his future, Olivia continues to use legal due process while she surreptitiously arranges for new identification documents for her family to leave the country, which she plans to do as soon as she finds Calvin. Enzo has an intense conversation with his mother when he shows her the audio recording and begs her to make things right, but Olivia vehemently denies everything. Joseph decides to file charges against Enzo, both hoping Olivia will break when she sees her son in jail.

At prison, Arthur continues to urge Obet to seek revenge on the Buenavidezes but Obet is no longer under his father's bad influence. Enzo later visits his grandmother Matilda and tells her the reason why he confessed a lie, he thought his mother couldn't bear her son taking the rap for her crime and would owe up to the truth, but she didn't. Horrified at the turn of events, that her grandsons are suffering the most cruel punishment for their mother's sins, proves cathartic for Matilda who admits her hand in Olivia's abusive childhood, and her husband Enrico's cruelty towards their daughter created a selfish and mentally ill individual who sought to be loved manipulates and lies to survive. She asks Enzo to forgive her.

Meanwhile, Olivia is determined to escape with her mother and two sons. She abducts Enzo by drugging him but he manages to call Joseph who brings the authorities. After a brief hostage situation where Olivia finally admits killing Victor, she escapes and Enzo is taken in. Calvin returns to the mental facility to recover from his mental illness.

For a few weeks, a brief period of calm follows as authorities pursue Olivia, now a fugitive. Enzo is released and reunites with Joseph. Calvin comes to terms with his fears and begins to heal. Obet realizes the error of his envy and reconciles with Joseph. Unknown to them, Olivia is nearby planning her final revenge. She hires an assassin to poison Joseph during his birthday party.

The finale episode depicts the parallel lives of Victor and Joseph's birthdays. Joseph's birthday begins with his first waking moments, full of hope and optimism about his family. He enjoys a traditional breakfast with his brother and grandfather, his first birthday without his mother, but joyous nonetheless over their renewed lives and second chances, climaxing to his birthday party, a toast and subsequent collapse from the poisoned drink.

Victor's last birthday also begins with his first waking moments: he is decisive on the changes he was about to make for his family; he spends breakfast with Olivia and his children, and the rest of the day was executing his legalization of Joseph, and executing documents to make things right for his three sons and Raquel. Flashback scenes intersperse with present day, revealing Olivia's anger at discovering his plan, her slipping the poison into Victor's champagne, and her toast to him before he leaves their home, and it climaxes to his collapse and death.

The authorities are closing in on Olivia, who won't leave without her sons. An anonymous caller tips the police on her whereabouts and after a brief chase, she crashes into a tree as her car bursts into flames engulfing her. In her hospital death bed, she apologizes to her sons for her crimes and the sufferings they went through because of her revenge. Joseph survives the poison attempt and visits her to tell her he forgives her. Olivia asks for Joseph's forgiveness as well, and she dies shortly.

The last scenes are a time skip to two important events in the lives of Enzo and Joseph Buenavidez.The mystery of Anthony's motives before he was killed is revealed when the two are advised by Anthony's lawyer that the money Anthony hid from Olivia was to protect the three boys until they solved Victor's murder case. With Olivia's confession, the money was released for the three boys to inherit. Victor and Anthony's will also provides for Calvin whom Victor never stopped regarding as his son. The second event was the two boys' graduation from Brizard College. At the grad ceremonies, all their friends and loved ones are in attendance. Obet reunites with Sabina, as Hazel with Joseph. The closing scene shows the four boys in front of the grave of Victor, sealing their relationship, with Obet as their Kuya, Calvin fully healed and all four ready to embark on their new lives as siblings.

== Cast and characters ==
=== Main cast ===
- Joshua Garcia as Joseph R. Buenavidez / Joseph Reyes — Victor's illegitimate son. Joseph is self-righteous, loving, and protective of his loved ones, especially his mother, Racquel. After his father's death, he inherits an equal share of Victor's estate, equivalent to Enzo and Calvin's inheritance. Throughout the course of the series, he starts to fix his relationship with his brothers. He also is constantly seeking justice for whoever murder his father. However, he becomes depressed after his mother's, Racquel, untimely death. He then resorts to writing threatening anonymous notes to the Buenavidez family in order to find out their deepest and darkest secrets. In the end, after finding getting justice for all that happened, he celebrates his birthday. However, Olivia ruins the moment by ordering someone for to poison Joseph. He then survives, and while she is on her deathbed, tells Olivia that he forgives her. In the finale, he, along with brother, are ready to face life, ready to outtake any challenge that it throws at them.
- Jerome Ponce as Lorenzo "Enzo" G. Buenavidez — The series' anti-hero. Victor's oldest legitimate son. Lorenzo is conflicted between seeking justice for his father's death or protecting his family's well kept secrets. In the beginning of the series, his relationship with Joseph is strainer but, as the series progresses, their relationship soon improves. In the mid-point in the show, Enzo realizes that his mother's lies will be the ultimate cause of their misery and their family ultimate destruction. Because of the events, he decides to pursue and find justice for not just his father's death, but now also from his uncle Anthony's death. In his pursuit for justice, Enzo becomes more and more like Victor, fighting for what is right, not worrying on who will get hurt. However, his investigations about his family's tragedies then lead him to the real culprit — Olivia Buenavidez — his own mother. After realizing the truth, Enzo then attempts to get his mother, Olivia, to confess her crimes by telling the authorities that he murdered Victor. In the end, he reconciles with Joseph, and also his mother before her ultimate demise.
- McCoy de Leon as Oliver "Obet" R. Moreno / Oliver "Obet" Reyes — Obet is Joseph's older half-brother, and Racquel's eldest son from her previous marriage with Arthur Moreno. He later becomes very frustrated when his parents refuse to fix their marriage and reconcile. Under his father's, Arthur, bad influence, Obet becomes jealous and envious of his brother's good fortune and luck, subsequently causing him to become bitter, rude, snobbish, and act frustrated in front of him. He makes it his life's purpose in making sure that he is better than Joseph. Amidst all of the events, he also falls in love with Sabina, however, their love is forbidden because due to them being part of opposite sides of society. After his mother's death, he decides to get revenge on Olivia, and denounces Joseph as his brother. Oliver then follows Arthur's previous criminal history and plans several schemes to get revenge on the Buenavidez family. In the latter part of the story, he reconciles with his brother and he saves him from a near-death encounter. In the end, he reconciles with all those whom he wronged and also pursues his relationship with Sabina.
- Nash Aguas as Calvin "Cal" G. Buenavidez / Calvin "Cal" G. Castillo — Olivia's youngest, but illegitimate son. Calvin was raised knowing that Victor was his father, however, his biological father is the family's driver, Dado, whom Olivia had a short encounter with after finding out of Victor's infidelity. He suffers from schizophrenia, which causes him to have violent tendencies often bringing harm to himself and also to others. In the earlier part of the series, Calvin was a person of interest in Victor's murder, but was later proven innocent. Calvin was later put into a mental institution, but was later kidnapped by Dado. Dado then brings him and Olivia into a remote destination, hoping to start a happy family with them. The Buenavidez family then find out of Olivia's crimes after listening to a secret recording made by Dado during his conversation with Olivia. He later then recovers from his mental illness and starts his journey in life with a positive outlook.

=== Supporting cast ===
- Eula Valdez as Olivia Gesmundo-Buenavidez / Victor's Killer — Victor's widow, mother to Calvin and Enzo. During her childhood, she was psychologically, emotionally, mentally and physically abused by her father, which caused her to have a nervous breakdown. This caused her to become a pathological liar. Her habitual lying continues throughout her life and ultimately caused the demise of her marriage. Olivia blames Racquel and her family for Victor's death. She becomes manipulative, scheming, and cruel. She wreaks havoc in Joseph's life, creating several schemes that almost destroy his family. The police puts her as a person of interest in Victor's death. The police later discover her past affair with Dado, the family driver. She attempted to flee the country due to financial problems in the company. During the series' finale, it is uncovered that Olivia was behind Victor's death, poisoning him after failing to accept her failed marriage. To get revenge on Joseph, she then poisons him on his birthday, in similar fashion to what she did to Victor. As she was trying to escape, her car crashes into a tree, causing the car to burn up. She then suffers from deadly burns. On her deathbed, she asks forgiveness from Joseph and her family.
- Mylene Dizon as Racquel A. Reyes-Moreno — Victor's former liaison as well as Joseph and obet's mother. Racquel has a history of easily losing her heart to several men, which consequently results into two unplanned pregnancies. Despite this, she remains faithful to God, righteous, kindhearted, and as well as a doting mother and daughter to her children and father, respectively. Upon Victor's death, she receives funds left to her through his will. She later then becomes a board member of the Buenavidez company and proves her worth, bringing the company out of bankruptcy. Despite several schemes thrown at her by Olivia, she remains kindhearted and even extends an olive branch to her. However, she dies after falling off of the company building during Dado and Olivia's confrontation. Her death causes Olivia, Joseph, Enzo, Calvin, and Obet's problems to escalate.
- Alexa Ilacad as Justiniana "Justine" Asuncion — Justine is described as beautiful, understanding, kindhearted — a good friend to Calvin. She aids Calvin with his family problems and gives him a shoulder to lean on during trying times. However, in the mid-point of the series, it is later revealed that Justine is on an imaginary friend of Calvin. She was created inside Calvin's mind during his schizophrenic state during a psychotic episode. Unfortunately, however, Calvin was then accused of murdering a police officer. Desperate to find an alibi for his brother, Enzo finds out that Justine is an actual person, a model who is struggling with finances. In order to get extra money, Justine agrees to pretend as Calvin's friend and alibi. However, Justine forgets that her friendship with Calvin is only a job, and espouses an actual friendship with him. In her person life, too, she struggles to make ends meet while also raising her autistic older sister, Vangie, who refers to her a "Tinay".
- Loisa Andalio as Hazel Castillo — Joseph's main love interest, the Buenavidez boys' best friend, as well as Dado and Emma's daughter. Her father, Dado, is a loyal worker for the Buenavidez family which is the reason for why she was able to study in a prestigious school with the help of Olivia and Victor. Although people think he has a bad attitude, Hazel is very close to him and knows his struggles, being his confidant and best friend. During Enzo's darkest hour, she never gives up on him and pursues to bring the friend she knew back to his former self. However, despite her closeness to Enzo, she is in love with Joseph. Hazel then reveals her true feelings to him during a trip to Batangas. Later, she is then thought as a suspect for the murder of policeman and Dado's accomplice. In order to clear her daughter's name, Emma reveals to the police that Hazel is an adopted daughter of Emma and Dado. In a quest to find her true mother, Hazel searches for her but is then told that her mother passed during her birth. Despite Dado's crimes, she still treats him as a father and attempts to bring him to his senses. In the end, she reconciles with Joseph and the Buenavidez family.
- Elisse Joson as Sabina De Guzman — The daughter of Ernesto and Miriam De Guzman. Her parents strived hard to give her good life, which is why they push her to take a course in business management, much to her detriment. Sabina would rather do something that makes her happy, but chooses to obey her parents in order to fulfill their dreams for her. She then meets Obet — the son of her father's employee, Racquel. At first, she is annoyed at him, considering him as a pervert, annoying, and a showoff. However, she soon warms up to him, thus, beginning a relationship with him. Unfortunately, circumstances come between them including her father's disapproval of Obet. Sabina then breaks up with him, trying to find herself, but promises to get back together with him once fulfilling this. Despite her failed relationship with him, Sabina remains a good friend to her former flame. In the finale, she reconciles with Obet and they pursue their relationship.

=== Very Special Role ===
- John Estrada as Atty. Anthony Buenavidez — Victor's younger brother and Joseph, Lorenzo, and Calvin's uncle. Since they were young, Anthony treated his brother, Victor, like his idol, for he raised the two of them when their parents abandoned them. In his youth, Anthony was stubborn, often getting into trouble with Victor correcting him. However, through his brother's perseverance, Anthony was able to get a degree in law and became the legal counsel for Buenavidez-De Guzman company. Anthony knows all of Victor's darkest secrets, being his confidant. However, it is later revealed that he has a motive to kill Victor, as he is madly jealous of his brother. During his quest for justice, he finds out that Calvin is Dado's son, Olivia embezzled millions for the company, and Olivia's lies. He then later falls in love with Racquel, causing more problems. Unfortunately, however, he was killed by Dado in order to stop him from investigating Victor's death. In the finale, it is revealed that he left the Buenavidez brothers an inheritance in which they could get this once Victor's murder is solved. They then receive their inheritance since their father's murder was solved.

=== Special participation ===
- Albert Martinez as Victor Buenavidez — The character whose life is revolved around by the story. Victor married Olivia Gesmundo, heiress to a rice corporation but, unfortunately, after a miscarriage, their marriage fell into despair. This caused him to start a brief affair with Racquel Reyes, which eventually resulted into a pregnancy. He is much happier with Racquel rather than his wife because of her simpler lifestyle rather than Olivia's lavish and rich lifestyle. His wife, Olivia, is jealous of him because her father respects and loves Victor like a son, rather than his own daughter. Victor then reconciles with Olivia, leaving Racquel and is completely oblivious to her pregnancy. As he returns to Olivia, she gives birth to their first-born son, Lorenzo, and they couple eventually have a second-born son named Calvin. Years later, he meets Joseph Reyes, and is unaware of their connection as father and son. Once he finds out, Victor wants to have a relationship with his estranged son. During this, he falls in love with Racquel again, and plans to leave Olivia for her and her family. He then files for divorces, assuring the future of his three sons. However, he then finds out that Calvin and Dado's son, but his feelings for his son do not change. Victor arranges to provide support for both of his families, including Olivia and Racquel. On the night of his birthday, he plans to leave Olivia, but is unfortunately poisoned. His death is the main aspect of the series. His death also brings his families together, while revealing secrets, and also ruining certain lives.
- Bernard Palanca as (young) Don Enrico Gesmundo, Olivia's abusive and domineering father, a misogynist and a philanderer. He was cruel to Olivia and abusive to his wife. He is the root of Olivia's mental illness and psychological disorders. He and his wife destroyed Olivia's life.
- Valerie Concepcion as (young) Doña Matilda Gesmundo, Enrico's long-suffering wife. Enrico's philandering and abuse drove Matilda towards her compulsive lying and chronic gambling addiction. She primed Olivia as a child to be a victim, her poor mothering skills and lack of maturity created a sociopath daughter.
- Mutya Orquia as (young) Olivia Gesmundo, a daughter who got a 2nd Place medal. She cut her doll's hair. Then, her partner, Dado cut her hair. After that, Olivia was scolded by her father, Enrico, after Dado cut her hair.

=== Recurring cast ===
- Liza Lorena as Doña Matilda Gesmundo — Olivia's mother and Enzo and Calvin's grandmother. While she was raising Olivia, she was emotionally and physically abused by her husband, Enrico, who only saw women as sexual objects and servant and not humans. During her marriage, she was cheated on several times to the point that she became immune to this. Because of her unstable marriage, she resorted to gambling to aid her pain. She also was bad mother, influencing Olivia that she should lie rather than admit the truth. This made her daughter transform into a habitual liar. Matilda's gambling addiction got so out of hand that her son-in-law, Victor, had to help her pay her debts by purchasing a huge lot of land. As some point the series, Matilda was considered a person of interest in Victor's death because of her gambling. In the mid-point of the series, she suffered from a stroke caused from stress when her daughter, Olivia, and grandson, Calvin, went missing and also when her family was stripped on their wealth. During their disappearance, she cared for by Enzo and her loyal maid, Britney. In the finale, she apologizes for her actions and her failure in raising Olivia, and also reconciles with the Reyes family.
- Ronnie Lazaro as Matias Reyes — Racquel's father, Joseph and Obet's grandfather. During his youth, he grew up from a poor family and, under the influence of his parents, was forced to steal in order to make a living. In one robbery, his brother was caught but, however, his father chose to abandon his own son rather than to save him. After that, Matias promises to never do anything against the law. He carries this throughout his life and always instills to his loved ones that to commit a crime. He raised his daughter, Racquel, alone as a single parent, and raised her as God fearing, righteous, kind, and loving. At some point, he became strained from Racquel after she fled to Manila in order to marry Arthur, a man whom he disapproved of. In his later years, Matias reunites with Racquel and helps her raise her children, and stands in as a father-figure during the absences of their fathers, Victor and Arthur, respectively. In the latter part of the story, he raises his grandchildren after the demise of his daughter. He tries to get Joseph and Obet to reconcile, however, fails. In the end, however, he gets through to Obet and he reconciles with Joseph.
- Jeric Raval as Diosdado "Dado" Castillo — Dado is Hazel's father, Emma's husband, and also Olivia's ex-lover. Dado was Olivia's childhood best friend, protector, It is then revealed that Dado is Calvin's biological father in a short encounter with Olivia. He brought Emma into the Gesmundo (Olivia's family) household where she later got her pregnant. Unfortunately, their child died shortly after her birth. To replace their deceased child, Emma adopts Hazel, whom Dado and her raise as their own. Throughout the course of the series, Dado commits several crimes just to protect Olivia and Calvin. He attempted to kill Joseph, in order to coverup all of Olivia's crimes. Dado then admits to killing Victor in order to stop the suspicions on Calvin and Olivia. He then does another attempt to kill Joseph during a camping trip, but ends up stabbing Enzo. In the process, he kills Anthony in order to stop him from investigating Victor's death. Desperate to retrieve his family, he kidnaps Calvin from the mental facility where he is in, and forces Olivia to come with him. After fulfilling his plan, he, along with Calvin and Olivia, live a simple and peaceful life on an island. Two months later, Olivia and Calvin escape, causing him to get his biggest ferocious revenge. He then has a heated confrontation with Olivia, in which he accidentally pushes Racquel off of the building. Dado manages to escape but is then shot by Arthur, causing him to fall into the river. Weeks pass, no signs were found of him, making everyone think he is dead. Later, Olivia receives threatening letter whom she immediately perceives as Dado sending them. However, it is later confirmed that his gunshot wounds from Arthur were proven deadly, and after falling into the water, caused her ultimate demise.
- Kathleen Hermosa as Emma Castillo — Hazel's mother and Dado's wife. Emma grew up from an abusive family, with her father making her a slave to do all of the household chores. She then made Dado, who became her best friend, and eventually helped her break free from her domineering father. Dado then brought Emma to the Gesmundo household where she began working as a maid. Eventually, on a one-night encounter when he was drunk, Dado got Emma pregnant. As a result, he married her. Unfortunately, the child died due to a high-fever. Desperate for her and Dado to have a child, she adopted Hazel and she and her husband raised her as their own child. Years later, her marriage with Dado falls apart when she discovers his affair with Olivia, eventually causing the end of their marriage. She blames herself for why Dado went astray, but realizes that she is not at fault for Dado's crimes.
- Michael Rivero as SPO1 Leandro Colmenares — He was the primary and lead investigator of Victor's murder. SPO1 Colmenares believed that Olivia was guilty of Victor's murder but, however, could not charge her because he had no evidence. Colmenares has a daughter named Princess, who is under the care of his brother, Romeo, who is also a cop. He was then very close to cracking Victor's death but, unfortunately, someone broke into his apartment, injuring him severely. As a result of his injuries, he dies. However, it is then revealed that Dado was the one responsible for killing Colmenares so that he would stop investigating. Later, it is confirmed that Dado had an accomplice in killing SPO1 Colmenares, it was Calvin — his biological son.
- Jojit Lorenzo as Bodjie — He is Anthony's best friend. Bodjie has been longtime employee and friend of the Buenavidez family, and also Anthony's confidant to all of his problems. Even after Anthony's death, he remains an employee in the Buenavidez-De Guzman company, while also replacing Anthony's position as the chief legal council of the company. He also is a friend to Racquel, often listening to her problems, and gives her friendly advice.
- Alex Medina as Arthur Moreno — He is Obet's father and Racquel's ex-husband. Arthur is Racquel's obsessive ex-husband who was the cost of Matias and Racquel's brief fallout. Matias refused to accept Arthur as Racquel's husband because he says he is a bad influence, and also their age-difference was also an issue with Racquel being slightly older than her husband. During their marriage, they had a son named Oliver. However, because he was desperate for money, he attempted to sell his son to a child-trafficking syndicate. This caused the ultimate demise of his marriage Racquel and also the cause of his imprisonment. Decades and years pass, Arthur is released from prison and is determined to woo his wife and son back to his arms. However, all else fails. He then starts a brief connivance with Olivia in order to orchestrate Anthony's downfall, for he is madly angry and jealous at him for stealing Racquel. At some point, he was a suspect in the murder of Anthony, for he is the main person who has a motive to kill him. Arthur influences his son, Obet, into hating Joseph and the Buenavidez family and also teaches him how to steal from people. He also uses his son in hopes of bringing him and Racquel back together, but all of his plans fail. In the latter part, he kills Dado blaming him for causing Racquel's death from her fall in the building. Because of this, Arthur was incarcerated. However, in the finale, he repents all of his deeds and joins his fellow inmates in daily readings of the bible, and also listens to the words of God.
- Art Acuña as Ernesto De Guzman — He is Sabina's father and Miriam's husband. Ernesto and his wife, Miriam, were struggling to make their company successful. The couple value their morals, especially Ernesto, who wants Sabina to take over their company. Olivia and her mother, Matilda, convinced Ernesto to invest in the already failing Buenavidez Rice company, because they did not inform him about their failing empire. He later uncovers the financial difficulties of the company and he and Anthony press charges against Olivia. In a side story, he disapproves Obet as Sabina's boyfriend. However, Sabina chooses to continue her relationship with Obet, which causes her to flee the house. Ernesto is also the main stockholder of the Buenavidez company. After Racquel's death, he becomes the CEO of the company, and also becomes Olivia's nemesis due to his refusal to return her former position. In finale, he accepts Obet and Sabina's relationship while also appearing cordial to the Reyes and Buenavidez family.
- Lovely Rivero as Miriam De Guzman — Sabina's mother and Ernesto's wife. Miriam and her husband, Ernesto, were struggling to make their business succeed after facing several financial issues. Unlike her husband, Miriam always think about the welfare of others, which is why she convinced Ernesto to stay in the partnership in the Buenavidez company. Throughout the series, Miriam and her daughter, Sabina, have had several arguments, mostly because of her career choice. In the mid-point of the show, she reconciles with Sabina and assures her that she supports her in all of her dreams.
- Igi Boy Flores as Jordan — Joseph's best friend at Brisard High School. He, along with Joseph and several others, were bullied by Enzo and his jock friends because they believed that they don't have the potential to be on the basketball team. However, Jordan proves himself and is accepted into the basketball team. People at the school call him ugly, fat, and unattractive, and he leans of Joseph to help him when he gets bullied. He and Joseph are the best of friends at Brisard, promising to always protect each other.
- Joj Agpangan as Cassie — Hazel's best friend at Brisard High School. Cassie is cheerful, comedic, and always brings a cheerful aura between her and Hazel when all else fail. She has a major crush on Joseph, and will go to extreme lengths to get him. However, she knows that Joseph has feelings for Hazel, which is why she gives way to them. She also tries to bring Joseph and Hazel together by bringing them together on several dates.
- Fifth Solomon as Terry — Olivia's secretary in the Buenavidez-De Guzman company. Terry hates being called just "Terry", and makes everyone, expect Anthony, Racquel, and Olivia, to call him "Ms. Terry." She is also Olivia's spy in the company. He reports to her all of Racquel and Anthony's movements so that she could come up with a plan to bring them all down. After Olivia's departure in the company, Terry becomes Racquel's secretary and he gladly calls her "Madam Racquel".
- Jennie Gabriel as Britney, house maid at the Buenavidez home. She witnesses the family drama first hand and has an accurate perception of events but remains silent.

=== Guest cast ===
- Joem Bascon as SPO3 George Encarnacion — The new lead investigator after SPO1 Colmenares' death. He is determined into cracking Victor's case, and is persistent in bringing justice to Olivia.
- Paul Salas as Dimitri "Trey" Gamboa, former Blue Jaguar basketball player, injured from a fall after a Blue Jaguars game. He claims Enzo pushed him off the balcony after a jealous rage, and Olivia is paying all his medical and physical therapy expenses to keep silent. He recanted his testimony against Enzo.
- Myrtle Sarrosa as Virginia "Vangie" Asunscion, Justine's elder sister who is a special child.
- Leo Rialp as Don Enrico Gesmundo, Olivia's misogynist and domineering father, prejudiced against women and a philanderer. He is cold and cruel to Olivia and abusive to his wife, but he admires and trusts his son in law, Victor, and leaves his company to him.

== Reception ==
Kantar Media National TV Ratings (9:15PM PST)
| Pilot Episode | Finale Episode | Peak | Average |
|---|---|---|---|
| 18.1% September 25, 2017 | 24.5% April 13, 2018 | 24.5% April 13, 2018 | TBD |

== Production ==
=== Casting ===
Elmo Magalona and Janella Salvador were initially part of the original cast, but were eventually pulled out because of major changes to the storyline and production. They were replaced by Jerome Ponce and Loisa Andalio respectively.

The Good Son marks Joshua Garcia and Loisa Andalio's mini-reunion after previously being paired together in the reality show Pinoy Big Brother: All In in 2014; the two also reunites with Jerome Ponce after being worked together in the afternoon drama Nasaan Ka Nang Kailangan Kita in 2015. The drama is also Nash Aguas and Alexa Ilacad's second major project after Bagito in 2014. Aguas, along with Eula Valdez, John Estrada, Albert Martinez and Liza Lorena, were previously part of the 2007 telenovela Maria Flordeluna. Meanwhile, the series is also McCoy de Leon and Elisse Joson's first major project; the latter also reunites with Ponce after the closure of their relationship in Pinoy Big Brother Lucky Season 7. Ponce, along with De Leon and Joson, previously appeared in the popular pre-noontime drama Be Careful With My Heart.

== Broadcast ==
=== Timeslot ===
The Good Son was supposed to be part of Kapamilya Gold afternoon block as initially planned. In a last minute change, however, the series eventually replaces A Love to Last as part of Primetime Bida evening block due to the viewers' demanding requests. The drama switched places with The Promise of Forever which is now demoted to Kapamilya Gold block, replacing The Better Half.

=== International Broadcast ===
The Good Son premiered in Kenya on November 19, 2018, replacing the one-month run of Muling Buksan ang Puso on NTV during the 6pm pre-primetime slot. Its broadcast competes with the run of the Pangako sa 'Yo remake on rival network KTN Home.

=== Re-runs ===
The show aired re-runs on Jeepney TV from February 4 to May 17, 2019; January 7, 2023 to March 2, 2024 and June 22, 2026 to January 8, 2027.

It also aired re-runs on Kapamilya Channel's Kapamilya Gold afternoon block and Kapamilya Online Live on September 14, 2020, replacing Love Thy Woman, and also on A2Z's Zuper Hapon on October 26, 2020. The series ended on both networks on March 31, 2021, aside from April 2, 2021, due to Holy Week in the Philippines. It was replaced by the re-runs of Magpahanggang Wakas.

== Awards ==
| Year | Award | Category | Nominee | Result |
|---|---|---|---|---|
| 2018 | Bulacan State University Batarisan Awards | Best Male TV Personality | Joshua Garcia | Won |
| 2018 | Golden Laurel Awards | Best TV Actor | Joshua Garcia | Won |
| 2018 | Gawad Tanglaw 2018 | Best Ensemble Acting | The Good Son | Won |
| 2018 | Gawad Pasado 2018 | Pinakapasadong Aktor Sa Teleserye | Joshua Garcia | Won |
| 2018 | 49th GMMSF Box Office Entertainment Awards | Best Ensemble Performance in a Drama Series | The Good Son | Won |
| 2018 | 32nd PMPC Star Awards for Television | Best Primetime Drama Series | The Good Son | Won |
| 2018 | 32nd PMPC Star Awards for Television | Best Drama Actor | Joshua Garcia | Won |
| 2018 | 32nd PMPC Star Awards for Television | Best Drama Actor | Jerome Ponce | Won |
| 2018 | 32nd PMPC Star Awards for Television | Best Drama Actor | Nash Aguas | Nominated |
| 2018 | 32nd PMPC Star Awards for Television | Best Drama Supporting Actor | John Estrada | Nominated |
| 2018 | 32nd PMPC Star Awards for Television | Best Drama Supporting Actress | Mylene Dizon | Nominated |
| 2018 | 32nd PMPC Star Awards for Television | Best Drama Supporting Actress | Eula Valdez | Nominated |

== See also ==
- The Good Daughter
- List of ABS-CBN Studios original drama series
- List of programs broadcast by Jeepney TV
