= Funny Ka, Pare Ko =

- Title card
- Genre: Situational comedy; Stand-up comedy
- Created by: ABS-CBN Corporation
- Developed by: Mark Awiten
- Written by: Alex Calleja; J.D. Cruz; Robin Sison; Victor Anastacio
- Directed by: Jon Red
- Creative director: Rhandy Reyes
- Starring: Bayani Agbayani; Karla Estrada; Jayson Gainza; Dennis Padilla; Alora Sasam; Joven Olvido; Donna Cariaga; Grae Fernandez; Kira Balinger; James Caraan; Nonong Ballinan; Carlo Mendoza; Igi Boy Flores; Alex Calleja; Erin Ocampo; Juliana Parizcova Segovia
- Country of origin: Philippines
- Original language: Filipino
- No. of seasons: 5
- No. of episodes: 100

Production
- Executive producers: Marvi Gelito; Alex Punzalan
- Running time: 60 minutes
- Production company: ABS-CBN Digital Terrestrial Television

Original release
- Network: Cine Mo!
- Release: April 3, 2016 – August 19, 2018

Funny Ka, Pare Ko (lit. You are Funny, My Friend) is a Philippine television sitcom series broadcast by Cine Mo!. Directed by Jon Red.

It aired for first season from April 3 to June 26, 2016, the show is top billed by seasoned comedy actors Bayani Agbayani, Karla Estrada and Jayson Gainza, and It's Showtime's segment "Funny One" grand champion Ryan Rems and finalists Nonong Ballinan, No Direction and Crazy Duo.

The second season aired from July 3 to September 25, 2016, Tommy Esguerra and Miho Nishida joined the sitcom.

After two seasons, the sitcom had its hiatus while the third season is worked out. The sitcom aired the best episodes of the first and second seasons respectively. The third season aired from January 8 to April 16, 2017, and fourth season aired from July 23 to October 8, 2017.

On its fifth season aired from May 20 to August 19, 2018, Carlo Mendoza, Dennis Padilla, Grae Fernandez, Kira Balinger, James Caraan, Pilipinas Got Talent 3rd Place Joven Olvido, and It's Showtime's segment "Funny One" season 2 grand champion Donna Cariaga joined the sitcom.

== Cast ==
=== Main ===
- Bayani Agbayani as Boyet “Bigboy” Delyon
- Karla Estrada as Carlita Delyon
- Jayson Gainza as Dong Dong
- Dennis Padilla as Don Jovi
- Alora Sasam as Pags
- Nonong Ballinan as himself
- Alex Calleja as Kap Al
- Igi Boy Flores as Jay-Ar
- Donna Cariaga as herself
- Joven Olvido as Attorney Petma
- Carlo Mendoza as Niknok
- Grae Fernandez as himself
- Kira Balinger as Princess
- James "Mamu" Caraan as himself
- Erin Ocampo
- Juliana Parizcova Segovia

=== Former ===
Season 1

- Beverly Salviejo
- Manuel Chua
- Mar Lopez
- Ryan Rems

Season 2

- Miho Nishida
- Tommy Esguerra
- Chun-sa Jung
- Jesse James Ongtengco

Season 3

- No Direction (Bangkay)
- Iskoobi Duo (?)

Season 4

- Jobert Austria
- Lee Bruno
- Iskoobi Duo (Jules)
- No Direction (Steven) and (Sadam)
- Crazy Duo (Diego) and (Gedent)
- Ysabel Ortega
- Rhed Bustamante
- Wacky Kiray
