= Nash Aguas =

Filipino actor and politician (born 1998)

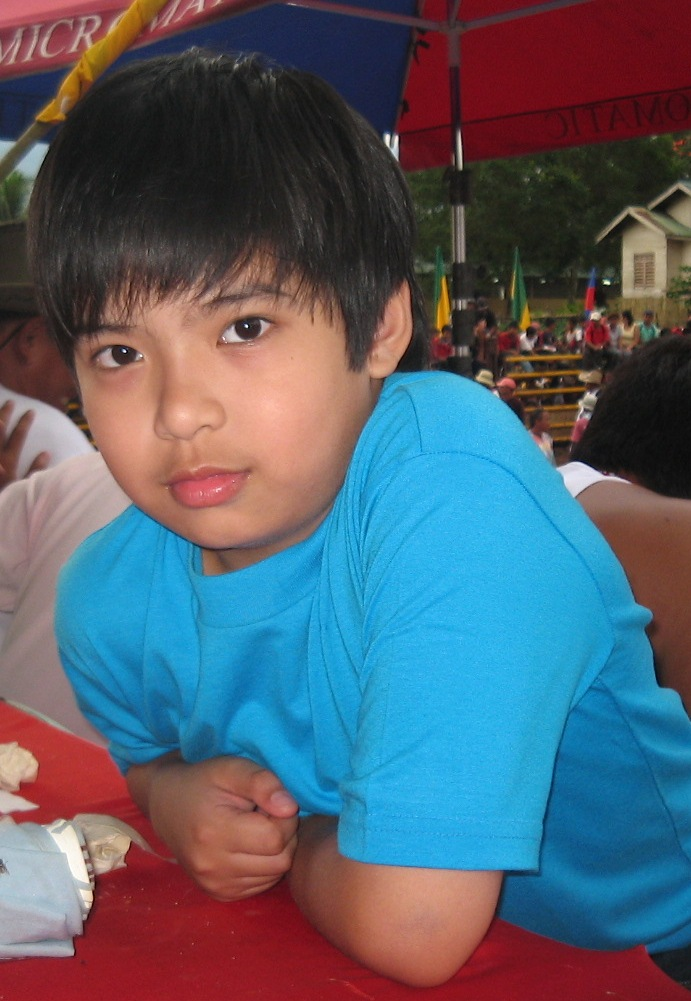
- Aguas in 2008

Member of the Cavite City Council
- In office June 30, 2022 – June 30, 2025

Personal details
- Born: Aeign Zackrey Victoriano Aguas; October 10, 1998 (age 28) Cavite City, Philippines
- Party: Lakas
- Height: 1.70 m (5 ft 7 in)
- Spouse: Mika dela Cruz (m. 2024)
- Relatives: Angelika Dela Cruz (sister-in-law)
- Education: Southville International School and Colleges
- Occupation: Actor and politician
- Musical career
- Genres: Pop; EDM; OPM
- Instrument: Vocals
- Years active: 2013–2018
- Label: Star Music (2013–2018)
- Formerly of: Gimme 5

Aeign Zackrey "Nash" Victoriano Aguas (Tagalog pronunciation: [ˈʔaɡwas]; born October 10, 1998) is a Filipino actor and politician.

In 2004, Aguas won the first season of the televised talent competition Star Circle Kid Quest on ABS-CBN. As a child actor on the network, he was a mainstay of the sketch comedy series Goin' Bulilit (2005–2011) and appeared in the 2007 teleserye Maria Flordeluna. As a teenager, he appeared in the teen sitcom Luv U (2013–2016) and played a teenage father in Bagito (2014). For his role in The Good Son (2017–2018), he received a PMPC Star Award nomination for Best Drama Actor. As a young adult, he appeared in A Soldier's Heart (2020).

In film, Aguas appeared in the Shake, Rattle & Roll horror film series and won the Metro Manila Film Festival Award for Best Child Performer twice—for Shake, Rattle and Roll 8 (2006) and Shake, Rattle and Roll 9 (2007). He also appeared in Shake, Rattle and Roll 12 (2010). Aguas was nominated for the FAMAS Award for Best Child Actor for his roles in Love Me Again (Land Down Under) and Kamoteng Kahoy (both 2008) as well as Larong Bata (2013). He starred opposite Sharlene San Pedro in the teen thriller Class of 2018. Aguas was also a member of the boy band Gimme 5, active from 2013 to 2017 and had released two studio albums.

He served as a councilor of Cavite City from 2022 to 2025.

== Early life and education ==
Aguas was born on October 10, 1998, in Cavite City, Philippines. His parents are separated with his father living in the United States.

He studied high school in Angelicum College. In 2016, Aguas pursued his college and studied A.B in Film in Meridian International Business, Arts and Technology College (MINT) College.

== Career ==
=== Entertainment career ===
At the age of five, Aguas made his television debut on the noontime variety show MTB, after joining the program's Batang F4 contest. In 2004, he joined ABS-CBN's talent search Star Circle Quest, where he won the title "Grand Kid Questor" and also won most of the special awards including "Darling of the Press" in the Finals Night. He was known as a mainstay in the Sunday comedy gag show Goin' Bulilit. In 2011, Aguas voiced the main character Joey Jones in the Tagalog-dubbed version of the anime series, Heroman.

In the previous years, Aguas was paired with Alexa Ilacad. They starred together in the Sunday teen sitcom show Luv U and the afternoon drama series Doble Kara. He also has a boy band group called "Gimme 5" with Joaquin Reyes, John Bermundo, Grae Fernandez and Brace Arquiza. In the 2014–2015 season, Aguas and Ilacad starred together in their first leading roles in the primetime drama series Bagito, alongside the rest of Gimme 5 members and Ella Cruz. Aguas and was paired again in the Dreamscape Production teleserye, The Good Son along with Loisa Andalio, Jerome Ponce, McCoy de Leon, Elisse Joson and Joshua Garcia.

In 2018, he starred in the teen suspense-thriller film, Class of 2018, opposite former Goin' Bulilit co-star Sharlene San Pedro.

In 2020, he started streaming Valorant. He also shout cast several tournaments including international championships (including Sentinels (esports) tournament) such as VCT and participated in several tournaments.

In 2021, Aguas made a comeback in TV shows by portraying the life of Apollo, a supporting character and an orphan in the series Huwag Kang Mangamba alongside several casts.

=== Political career ===
Under Lakas–CMD, Aguas was elected to the Cavite City Council in the 2022 election, wherein he won the second-highest number of votes. He did not seek reelection in 2025.

== Personal life ==
He is the co-owner of Japanese restaurant MuraMen which opened in 2017 and has a total of eight branches.

Aguas and Mika Dela Cruz first met as child actors in 2007 on the set of Tiyanaks and later co-starred on Goin' Bulilit; and the two started as friends until they began dating in October 2018. On May 18, 2024, Aguas and Mika Dela Cruz revealed that they were married. The couple celebrated an intimate ceremony with the bride's sister Angelika Dela Cruz at the Adriano's Events Place and Prayer Garden in Tagaytay.

== Filmography ==
=== Film ===
Year	Title	Role
2005	Happily Ever After	Leeboy
2005	Hari Ng Sablay	Jayjay
2006	I Will Always Love You	young Justin
2006	Shake, Rattle and Roll 8	Benjo
2007	Tiyanaks	Biboy
2007	Angels	Angelo
2007	Shake, Rattle and Roll 9	Stephen
2008	Dayo	Bubuy (voice)
2009	BFF: Best Friends Forever	Paupau
2009	Kamoteng Kahoy	Ariel
2010	Shake, Rattle and Roll 12	Ryan
2010	Father Jejemon	Carlo
2010	I Do	Dakila
2012	Larong Bata	Gelo
2016	Resbak	Angelo
2018	Class of 2018	RJ
2019	The Gift	Kokoy
2022	Labyu with an Accent	Dino

=== Television ===
Year	Title	Role
2004	Star Circle Kid Quest	Contestant / 1st Grand Kid Questor
2005–2011	Goin' Bulilit	Himself / Various Roles
2005	OK Fine Whatever	Nash
2005–2006	Mga Anghel na Walang Langit	Allan
2005–2006	My Juan and Only	Neton
2006	Gulong ng Palad	Peping Santos
2006	Komiks Presents: Inday Sa Balitaw	Boyong
2006	Komiks Presents: Vulcan 5	Boyet
2006	Maalaala Mo Kaya: Poon	Jun
2006	Calla Lily	Terrence
2007	Maria Flordeluna	Reneboy Alicante
2007	Maalaala Mo Kaya: Bisikleta Part III	young Andoy
2007	Sineserye Presents: Natutulog Ba Ang Diyos?	young Mark
2007	Princess Sarah	Romeo
2008	Lobo	Tikboy Kabigting
2008	Love Spell: The Lies	
2009	May Bukas Pa	Val/Joey
2009	Dahil May Isang Ikaw	young Red "Pip" Ramirez
2010	Tanging Yaman	young Jomari Buenavista
2010	Goin' Bulilit Presents: Prom the Bottom of my Heart	Nash
2010	Maalaala Mo Kaya: Kalapati	young Benigno Simeon "Noynoy" Aquino, III
2010	Maalaala Mo Kaya: Diploma	Rico
2010	Magkaribal	young Louie
2010	Maalaala Mo Kaya: Kuliglig	young Manny
2011	Goin' Bulilit Presents: Dance Upon A Time	Dred
2011	Goin' Bulilit Presents: In My Dreams	Jon
2011	Agimat: Ang Mga Alamat ni Ramon Revilla: Bianong Bulag	young Biano
2011	Maalaala Mo Kaya: Tropeo	young Jun
2011	Minsan Lang Kita Iibigin	young Alexander/Javier del Tierro
2011	Maalaala Mo Kaya: Wig	young Edwin/Rey
2011	Guns and Roses	preteen Marcus Aguilar
2011	Maalaala Mo Kaya: Tap Dancing Shoes	Lordito "Bambi" Mata
2011	Ikaw ay Pag-Ibig	Andoy / young Andrew
2011	Wansapanataym: Happy Neo Year	Janus
2011	Maalaala Mo Kaya: Saklay	young Kurt
2012	Maalaala Mo Kaya: Panyo	Justin
2013–2016	Luv U	Benjamin "Benj" Jalbuena
2013	Maalaala Mo Kaya: Tirintas	Jomer
2013	Maalaala Mo Kaya: Double Bass	Christian
2014	Wansapanataym: Enchanted House	Philip Mercado Barin
2014	Wansapanataym: Perfecto	Perry Delgado
2014–2022; 2026–present	ASAP	Himself / Performer
2014–2015	Bagito	Andrew "Drew" Medina
2015	FPJ's Ang Probinsyano (season 1)	Teenage Ador de Leon/Cardo Dalisay
2016–2017	Doble Kara	Paolo Acosta
2016	Maalaala Mo Kaya: Golden Boy	young Josef
2016	Maalaala Mo Kaya: Paru-paro	Jewesis
2017	Home Sweetie Home	Kiko
2017–2018	The Good Son	Calvin "Cal" Buenavidez
2019	Kaibigan Special Sunday	Various
2020	A Soldier's Heart	Michael Mendoza
2021	Maalaala Mo Kaya: Bible	Robert Pepino
2021	Huwag Kang Mangamba	Apollo Policarpio
2022	FPJ's Ang Probinsyano (season 9)	Teenage Ador de Leon / Cardo Dalisay
2024	Rainbow Rumble	Contestant

== Awards and nominations ==
Year	Award-Giving Body	Category	Nominated Work	Result
2006	2006 Metro Manila Film Festival	Best Child Performer	Shake, Rattle & Roll 8	Won
2007	2007 Metro Manila Film Festival	Best Child Performer	Shake, Rattle & Roll 9	Won
2010	58th FAMAS Awards	Best Child Actor	Love Me Again	Nominated
2010	58th FAMAS Awards	Best Child Actor	Kamoteng Kahoy	Nominated
2013	61st FAMAS Awards	Best Child Actor	Larong Bata	Nominated
2014	2014 Yahoo! Celebrity Awards	Loveteam of the Year (shared with Sharlene San Pedro)	—N/a	Nominated
2015	PEPlist Awards	Most Promising Pair (shared with Alexa Ilacad)	—N/a	Won
2017	MYX Music Awards	Favorite Guest Appearance in a Music Video	Pakipot, Suplado by Alexa Ilacad	Won
2019	35th PMPC Star Awards for Movies	Loveteam of the Year (shared with Sharlene San Pedro)	Class of 2018	Nominated
