= Ryan Rems =

Filipino comedian and television personality

Ryan Rems Sarita
- Born: Ryan Rems Sarita; November 3, 1978 (age 47); Tarlac City , Philippines
- Notable work: It's Showtime (co-host, 2015–present); Funny Ka Pare Ko (2016)
- Height: 5'8

Comedy career
- Years active: 2005–present
- Medium: Television, stand-up
- Genre: Observational comedy
- Subjects: Popular culture, stereotypes, human sexuality, reality, non-sequitur

Ryan Rems Sarita (born November 3, 1978) is a Filipino comedian and television personality. He was the first Funny One grand winner of the ABS-CBN noontime variety show, It's Showtime. He was also a rapper back in the late '90s with the stage name Pareng William. He is also known for being a founder of a Cult with nine members.

== Personal life ==
He holds a degree of Communication Arts from Centro Escolar University. He once worked as a call center agent, an online English tutor, and a member of a rock band. He was influenced by popular rock icons like Elvis Presley and The Beatles as well as American retired wrestler Ric Flair. He also tried his luck applying for a writer position in different television networks but failed to make the cut.

== Career ==
Sarita has been a comedian since 2008, but was not discovered until 2015, when he rose to fame as a contestant for It's Showtime's The Funny One, a segment dedicated for budding comedians. Dubbed as Rakistang Komikero (Rocker Comedian), he is notable for his non-sequitur anti-humor and deadpan delivery of jokes as well as his famous catchphrase "O'right! Rock 'N Roll to the World" that eventually became popular online. Sarita's one-liner, deadpan, self-deprecating comedy style is derived from the works of Mitch Hedberg. He was already eliminated in the earlier rounds, but was given a second chance in the wildcard and face-off rounds. He was given an almost perfect score by the judges to become the first-ever grand winner of the competition. He once performed with Hong Kong–based famous stand-up comedian Vivek Mahbubani during a gig in Cebu.

On August 10, 2015, he made his debut as an It's Showtime's resident stand-up comedian and one of show's co-hosts, Vanessa Kins. March 28, 2017. He, along with veteran comedian Bayani Agbayani and other Funny One finalists, is set to star in a new sitcom entitled Funny Ka Pare Ko.

He is one of the comedians of Comedy Manila, an organization that produces quality comedy shows featuring local and foreign acts in the Philippines.

== Filmography ==
=== Film ===
| Year | Title | Role |
|---|---|---|
| 2025 | Sampung Utos Kay Josh | |

=== Television ===
| Year | Title | Role |
|---|---|---|
| 2015 | It's Showtime | Himself / Contestant / Winner |
| 2015 | Matanglawin | Guest |
| 2015 | Rated K | Himself |
| 2016 | Funny Ka, Pare Ko | Cool Rocker |
| 2016 | My Super D | Steve |
| 2016 | Langit Lupa | Jawo |
| 2017 | Banana Sundae | Guest |
| 2018 | Bagani | Damo |
| 2019 | Ipaglaban Mo! | Buds |
| 2019 | Jhon en Martian | Airport Officer 2 |
| 2019 | Manilennials | Artist 2 |
| 2022 | He's Into Her | Tiago |
| 2022 | Beach Bros | Greg |
