= Kristel Fulgar =

Filipino actress, singer, and YouTuber (born 1994)

- Born: Kristel Aina Oquindo Fulgar; December 29, 1994 (age 31); Manila, Philippines
- Education: University of Santo Tomas
- Years active: 2002–present
- Agents: Star Magic (2002–2022); NYMA Talent Management (2022–present)
- Spouse: Ha Su Hyuk (m. 2025)

Kristel Aina Oquindo Fulgar-Ha (born December 29, 1994), is a Filipino actress, singer and vlogger. She is known for her participation in television dramas and in the sketch comedy show Goin' Bulilit (2005). As a vlogger, Fulgar has a YouTube channel called KrisTells Vlogs.

== Business ==
In 2024, Fulgar launched her own fragrance line, Kalmellow with two signature scents.

== Personal life ==
Kristel Aina Oquindo Fulgar was born on December 29, 1994, in Manila. She is a member of the religious group Iglesia ni Cristo (INC). She studied mass communication at the University of Santo Tomas and graduated in 2015. Fulgar is fluent in English, Filipino and Korean.

In late 2022, she signed with South Korean agency Five Stones Entertainment. In January 2024, she underwent surgery to remove a schwannoma in her leg. In November 2024, Fulgar announced her relationship with Korean national Ha Su Hyuk after he joined the INC. The couple were engaged in February 2025, and married in May 2025.

== Filmography ==
=== Film ===
Year	Film	Role
2003	Malikmata	
2004	Lastikman: Unang Banat	
2004	Forever My Love	Kayla
2005	Bahay ni Lola 2	Carla
2008	Shake, Rattle & Roll X	Jennylyn
2009	Dalaw	Estella
2010	Dampi	
2011	Way Back Home	Froggy
2015	Felix Manalo	Grandchild
2017	Can't Help Falling in Love	Viel
2018	Class of 2018	Princess
2018	Kahit Ayaw Mo Na	Mikee
2021	Lost Stars Within Us	Kira

=== Television ===
Year	Title	Character/Role	Note
2002	Bituin	young Melody Sandoval	
2004	Marina	young Luna	
2004	Mulawin	young Alwina	
2004	Magpakailanman	young Giselle, young Jennylyn	Episodes: "Ang Salamin ng Kanyang mga Pangarap (The Giselle Sanchez Story)", "Ano ang Kulay ng Tunay na Pagmamahal (The Jennylyn Mercado Untold Story)"
2005	Goin' Bulilit	herself	Various roles
2005	Kampanerang Kuba	young Matilda Durano	
2006	Your Song	Nene	Episode: "My Grown-Up Christmas List"
2007	Maria Flordeluna	Wilma Espero	
2007	Maalaala Mo Kaya	Rita	Episode: "Sako"
2007	1 vs. 100	herself	"The Mob"
2008	Maalaala Mo Kaya	Glaiza	Episode: "Isda"
2009	Maalaala Mo Kaya	young Marivic	Episode: "Bola"
2010	Maalaala Mo Kaya	Eunice	Episode: "Kariton"
2010	Kung Tayo'y Magkakalayo	young Aludra	
2010	Maalaala Mo Kaya	Victoria	Episode: "Gitara"
2010	Wansapanataym	Kate	Episode: "Mac Ulit Ulit"
2010	Maalaala Mo Kaya	Alexis	Episode: "Seaweeds"
2011	Mula sa Puso	teenage Selina Pereira-Matias	
2011	Maalaala Mo Kaya	Tessa	Episode: "Palengke"
2011	Wansapanataym	Ella	Episode: "Apir Disapir"
2012	Wansapanataym	Episode: "Somewhere Over The Bahaghari"	
2012	Dahil sa Pag-Ibig	Andrea Rivero	
2013	Maalaala Mo Kaya	Donita	Episode: "Orasan"
2013	Juan dela Cruz	young Amelia dela Cruz	
2013	Maalaala Mo Kaya	young Karen Balot	Episode: "Family Picture"
2013–2014	Got to Believe	Editha "Didith" Pantoja	
2014	Wansapanataym	Jonaluz	Episode: "Witch-A-Makulit"
2014	Maalaala Mo Kaya		Episode: "Sulat"
2014	Bagito	Jean	
2015	Pangako sa 'Yo	Ichu Miranda	
2016–present	ASAP	herself	
2016	Maalaala Mo Kaya	Melvie	Episode: "Kadena"
2016	Wansapanataym	Aileen	Episode: "Holly & Mau"
2017	La Luna Sangre	Luningning Ramos	
2017	Dok Ricky, Pedia	Trixie	
2018	Ngayon at Kailanman	Queenie	
2019	Maalaala Mo Kaya	Nessa	Episode: "Contest"
