= Bagito =

2014–15 Philippine television drama series

- Title card
- Genre: Melodrama; Teen drama; Romance; Comedy; Coming of age
- Created by: ABS-CBN Studios; Rondel P. Lindayag
- Based on: Bagito by Noreen Capili
- Developed by: ABS-CBN Studios; John Joseph Tuason
- Written by: Rafael Mercado; Noreen Capili; John Joseph Tuason; Mark Bunda; Anton Pelon
- Directed by: Onat Diaz; Jojo A. Saguin
- Creative director: Johnny delos Santos
- Starring: Nash Aguas; Alexa Ilacad; Ella Cruz; Ariel Rivera; Angel Aquino; Agot Isidro
- Opening theme: "Batang Bata Ka Pa" by CHIRO and Sugarfree
- Composer: Jim Paredes
- Country of origin: Philippines
- Original language: Tagalog
- No. of episodes: 85

Production
- Executive producers: Carlo Katigbak; Cory Vidanes; Laurenti Dyogi; Roldeo Endrinal; Julie Anne Benitez
- Producers: Emerald C. Suarez; Maya Manuel Aralar
- Production location: Metro Manila
- Editor: Rommel Malimban
- Running time: 25–28 minutes
- Production company: Dreamscape Entertainment Television

Original release
- Network: ABS-CBN
- Release: November 17, 2014 – March 13, 2015

Bagito (lit. Novice) is a Philippine television drama teen series broadcast by ABS-CBN. The series is based on the Wattpad series of the same title by Noreen Capili. Directed by Onat A. Diaz and Jojo A. Saguin, it stars Nash Aguas, Alexa Ilacad and Ella Cruz. It aired on the network's Primetime Bida line up and worldwide on TFC from November 17, 2014, to March 13, 2015, replacing Pure Love and was replaced by Inday Bote.

== Plot ==
Drew (Nash Aguas) is a teenager forced to face the responsibilities of being a young father because of his huge mistake. How will Drew's newly born child change his life and the lives of his loved ones? Is he ready to leave his childhood behind and face the difficulties of being a young father? How will Drew's parents help and guide him as he enters the "real world"?

=== Summary ===
Enjoying a teenage life, second year high school teen Andrew Medina (Nash Aguas) looks forward to maturity. After a one-night stand results in the unplanned pregnancy of an attractive and brilliant college student named Vanessa Bueno (Ella Cruz), Andrew thinks he committed a huge mistake and takes the responsibilities of teenage fatherhood, changing both his and his love ones' lives. When his son Albert, nicknamed Albie, is born, Drew faces the many realities of being a father and manages to succeed. However, it would be found out through a DNA test that he is not the child's real father and Vanessa only used him as a cover up. After a tearful parting of ways between Drew and Albie, Vanessa reconciles with her former boyfriend and Albie's biological father, bullying campus jock Ralph (Alexander Diaz). As he accepts the responsibilities of being a father, he begins to act more responsible but later returns to his vices like drinking, partying, gambling, and drug usage, making him abuse his son. Andrew will later fight for Albie's custody and to adopt him once again after seeing Ralph's actions, with the help of Camille, who also wanted to adopt the child.

=== Synopsis ===
Second year high school teenager Andrew Medina, nicknamed Drew, is excited to enjoy his teenage life and take new responsibilities, aiming to be an airline pilot. His father Gilbert (Ariel Rivera) is ready to migrate to the United States for his new job but tells him that he should make the most out of his teenage life and focus on his studies while balancing them to being a new head of the household. Drew's mostly hangs out with his friends and prevent them from doing wrong things such as voyeurism, wherein he is blamed but is found out innocent.

Despite his mere inability to understand algebra, Vanessa Bueno (Ella Cruz), an attractive and popular but brilliant first year college student taking up BS Accountancy in the same school Drew studies in, tutors and aids him. Eventually, Drew gets infatuated with her. Vanessa herself is in a relationship with a fearsome, bullying campus jock named Ralph Robles. On Drew's 14th birthday, after a celebration in the Medina household with his friends, the gang goes to a nightclub for a snack but are asked to leave after Vanessa catches them. She makes Drew kiss her upon the request of the group on the condition that they will return home. Drew inadvertently kisses her on her lips much to the shock of Vanessa's boarding house mates.

Vanessa breaks up with Ralph after seeing, she and Andrew talk about their lives. One night, Drew visits the boarding house where Vanessa resides. He enters to find a drunk Vanessa and takes her to her room while telling her that drinking is bad for her health. Vanessa drunkenly refuses and relents by collapsing on the floor. She and Drew seemingly make out. Eventually, Drew spends the night with her. Weeks later, Vanessa experiences morning sickness and discovers her pregnancy. Camille Lorenzo (Alexa Ilacad), Andrew's childhood friend, reunites with him a few days later. Her mother, Sylvia, who is Gilbert's former lover, also reunites with Drew alongside her businessman husband, Arman, and later takes on the role of the school principal. One day during an outing, Drew hangs out with Camille and jokes to her about scars on her legs. While Camille reveals to him that her scars have faded, she and Drew recall their childhood and they began to play a favorite game of theirs. Camille however slips and wounds her left thigh and Drew tends to her wounds. Sylvia (Agot Isidro) notices this and mistakes it for sexual harassment after asking Drew to find a first-aid kit.

== Cast and characters ==
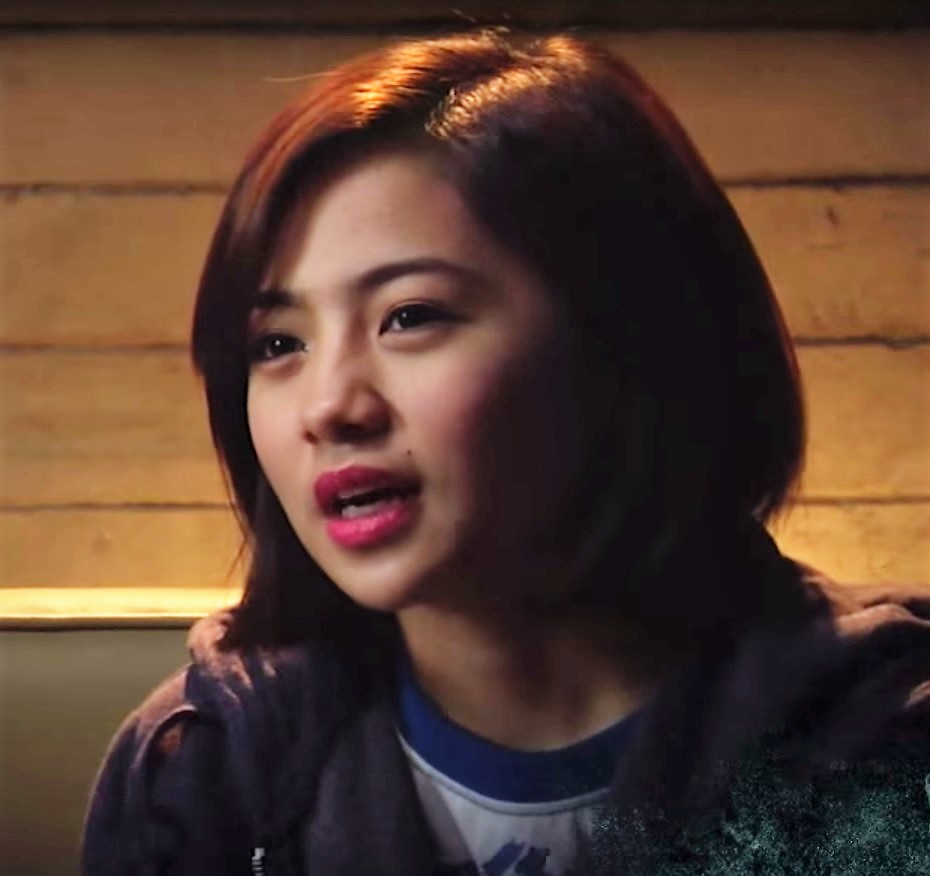
Ella Cruz portrays Vanessa Bueno.

Main cast

- Nash Aguas as Andrew "Drew" A. Medina – a high school teen who inadvertently bore the responsibilities of a young father
- Alexa Ilacad as Camille S. Lorenzo-Medina – Andrew's childhood friend who harbors feelings for Andrew since their childhood. She also acts as a mother-figure to Albie during Vanessa's absence and when Ralph is doing vices. In the end, she is engaged to Andrew.
- Ella Cruz as Vanessa Bueno – an attractive college student whom Andrew is infatuated with, and who mistakenly believes Andrew to be her child's father.

Supporting cast

- Angel Aquino as Raquel Alvarez-Medina – Andrew and Yuri's mother, Gilbert's wife and Albie's grandmother.
- Ariel Rivera as Gilbert Medina – Andrew and Yuri's adoptive father, Raquel's husband and Albie's adoptive grandfather who works as a teacher and is ready to move to the United States for a similar job only to halt the plan when he discovers Vanessa's responsibility.
- Agot Isidro as Sylvia Samson-Lorenzo - Camille's mother, who becomes the school principal of the basic education department of Andrew's school. Although she is irate of Andrew's behavior, she occasionally has a good relationship with him.
- Alex Diaz as Ralph Robles – an upper-middle-class boy who is a popular sports jock in the college department of Andrew's school taking up a course in information technology and always gets his way by bullying. He is a frequent drinker and party-goer who is feared by many. His womanizing habits and irresponsibilities cause his breakup with Vanessa. In the mid-part of the series, he is revealed to be the biological father of Vanessa's child. In the finale he was arrested by the authorities for child abuse against Albie and was involved with other criminal activities.
- Ryle Santiago as Jerrick
- John Bermundo as Vince
- Grae Fernandez as Carlo
- Brace Arquiza as Toffer
- Joaquin Reyes as Warren
- Kristel Fulgar as Jean
- Amy Nobleza as Blessie
- Marc Santiago as Yuri
- Roni Abario as Teacher Edgar
- Maritess Joaquin as Helen

Extended cast

- Lollie Mara as Teresita Samson
- Nick Lizaso as Joselito Medina
- Lui Manansala as Lourdes Medina
- Art Acuña as Armand Lorenzo
- Marvin Yap as Cesar Cruz
- Gee Canlas as Ellise Alvarez
- Marnie Lapus as Teacher Imee
- Wendy Villacorta as Marissa Medina
- Chinie Concepcion as Teacher Virgie
- Jong Cuenco as Atty. Harold Guzman

Special guests

- Kyle Banzon as young Andrew Alvarez
- Allyson McBride as young Camille Lorenzo
- Mutya Orquia as young Vanessa Bueno
- Jillian Ward as Jessica Marquez
- Jeo Aquines as grown-up Albert "Alby" B. Medina (finale episode) – The son of Vanessa to Ralph who is later adopted by Andrew and Raquel and Gilbert's grandson

== Re-runs ==
It aired re-runs on Jeepney TV from January 14 to June 3, 2017 (replacing the re-runs of Lastikman); from September 29 to December 15, 2018 (replacing the re-runs of Bridges of Love); from September 23 to November 15, 2019 (replacing the re-runs of Sana Maulit Muli); from January 16 to May 12, 2023 (replacing the re-runs of Katorse); from March 17 to May 9, 2025, that also aired on ALLTV (replacing the re-runs of All of Me); and from September 14, 2026 to January 8, 2027 (replacing the re-runs of Huwag Ka Lang Mawawala).

== Reception ==
KANTAR MEDIA NATIONAL TV RATINGS (5:45PM PST)
| PILOT EPISODE | FINALE EPISODE | PEAK | AVERAGE | SOURCE |
|---|---|---|---|---|
| 27.2% | 20.7% | 28.4% | 25.4% | |

== See also ==
- List of programs broadcast by ABS-CBN
- List of ABS-CBN Studios original drama series
- List of Philippine films based on Wattpad stories
- List of programs broadcast by Jeepney TV
