= Joaquin Reyes (Filipino actor) =

Filipino actor and singer-songwriter (born 2000)

- Born: Joaquin Lucas Miguel Saavedra Reyes; October 28, 2000 (age 25); Quezon City, Philippines
- Occupations: Actor, singer, songwriter
- Years active: 2011–present
- Agent: Star Magic (2013–2017)
- Height: 5 ft 6.5 in (169 cm)

Joaquin Lucas Miguel Saavedra Reyes (born October 28, 2000) is a Filipino actor, singer and songwriter. He was a member of Gimme 5 an all-boy group in the Philippines that was signed under ABS-CBN, Star Magic and Star Music.

== Career ==
Joaquin Reyes made his first acting stint in Muling Buksan Ang Puso where he plays young Leonel Beltran, the younger version of Enchong Dee's character. After a lot of stints & guestings, that particular episode made his break through the walls of the TV industry. He shared that since his appearance from the show, Star Magic immediately kept in touch with them. He also shared that, after few months since he appeared, he guested on Minute to Win It along with not knowingly his soon-to-be group mates, Grae Fernandez & Brace Arquiza. Joaquin described that they went through make overs, trainings & other preparations while being clueless that they were going to be formed as a group. Currently, he is a member of Gimme 5.

Reyes, before joining Gimme 5, has done various commercials including his very first commercial 'drumline' from Milo. Since then, Joaquin did many commercials until he slowly entered the TV industry. One of his first lead roles was in an episode of Jollitown. In Season 4, Episode 10, he portrayed "Jason" who doesn't have any patience to learn things. At first, he never thought of being a celebrity or anything that is in the show business. He admits that when he joined the group didn't know what to do as things paced by quickly.

Joaquin said that the life of being in a boy group for him is very fun. He said much changed since the moment they were launched. He described it as one of the best things you can do, having fun with your work.

Reyes wrote a song for their second album, Sophomore. He said that both he and Nash Aguas submitted around 3–4 of their songs, and the management picked one each. 'Hindi Ko Alam' is the title of the song that Joaquin wrote. They often joke about the title of the song on their shows asking each other what the next song is. He shares a 'not so typical' story on how he wrote the song which has also no way to do with the lyrics. On his international musical influences, he mentioned various bands in different interviews including, The Beatles, One Direction, Bee Gees, Imagine Dragons. For his local influence, he said his music is heavily influenced "Eraserheads", especially Ely Buendia since many of The Heads' songs are written by Buendia.

== Gimme 5 (2013–2018) ==
In 2013, the band debuted on ASAP 18 where they performed The Wanted's "Glad You Came". The group admits to not being good singers. Nash even describes his voice as "parang pinunit na maong" but still, they proved their worth. Since then, the group improved themselves as singers, dancers and models. Their following on social media had grown since.

In November 2014, Gimme 5 released their self-titled debut album under Star Music. They also starred in the TV series Bagito alongside Ella Cruz, Angel Aquino, and Nash Aguas which ended in March 2015. The group were interviewed by Myx on how they got their group name and was supposedly named "baby boys" which they found "baduy".

After the TV series Bagito they resumed their album tour which was slowed down due to the TV Series. Non-stop sold out album tours were held in different places in the Philippines, giving their fans a chance to watch them perform live. The group also shared in an interview with PUSH a memorable fan experience in Albay Astrodome in Legazpi. They first won an award in June 2015, as "Most Promising Recording/Performing Group" in 46th GMMSF Box-Office Entertainment Awards. On August 14, 2015, The "Teen Power: The Kabataan Pinoy Concert Party" led by Gimme 5 and joined by the PBB 737 Teen Housemates, was held at the Aliw Theater in Pasay.

In September 2015, the hit local boy group Gimme 5 won the "Clash of Celebrities" on Saturday, which was part of the kick-off celebration for the sixth anniversary of "It's Showtime" held at the Smart Araneta Coliseum.

Before they ended their tour, they shared what they mostly do before they start the show. After a year of touring, their final leg was held in Dagupan on May 7, 2016. After their final leg, they decided to lean on acting as individuals. In June 2016, Star Music and Gimme 5 announced that the group will release a second album for their fans. Aguas said in an interview that some of the songs will be written by them.

== Discography ==
=== Music videos ===
Year	Title	Artist	Details	Ref.
2014	Hatid Sundo	Gimme 5	Words & Melody By: Miles Noel & Kidwolf; Beat & Arrangement By: Kidwolf; Vocal Arrangement By: Miles Noel & Francis Salazar; Mastered and Produced By: Kidwolf; Published By: Star Songs, Inc.	
2015	Pag Kasama Ka	Gimme 5	Released Date: 28 March 2015; Published By: Star Songs, Inc.	

=== Singles ===
Year	Track	Artist	Details	Ref.
2015	"Aking Prinsesa"	Gimme 5	Words & Melody By: Daryl Barbaso & Brian Barbaso; Video and Edited By: Eaizen Almazan & Archelle de Belen	
2015	"Hey Girl"	Gimme 5	Words & Melody By: Kennard Faraon; Lyric Video By: Jasmine Marie Maragay	
2015	"Growing Up"	Gimme 5	Words and Music By: Rox Santos; Beat and Arrangement By: Kidwolf	

=== Studio albums ===
On 6 November 2014, Gimme 5 released their debut album under Star Music.

Gimme 5

Studio album by Gimme 5
- Released: November 6, 2014
- Recorded: 2014
- Genre: P-pop, Pop
- Language: English, Filipino
- Label: Star Music

No.	Title	Artist	Length
1.	"Pag Kasama Ka"	Gimme 5	3:25
2.	"Hatid Sundo"	Gimme 5	3:06
3.	"Aking Prinsesa"	Gimme 5	4:05
4.	"Hey Girl"	Gimme 5	3:44
5.	"Growing Up"	Gimme 5	3:07
6.	"Ikaw Na Na"	Gimme 5	3:24

Additional Tracks (Minus One)
No.	Title	Artist	Length
1.	"Pag Kasama Ka (Minus One)"	Gimme 5	3:25
2.	"Hatid Sundo (Minus One)"	Gimme 5	3:06
3.	"Aking Prinsesa (Minus One)"	Gimme 5	4:05
4.	"Hey Girl (Minus One)"	Gimme 5	3:44
5.	"Growing Up (Minus One)"	Gimme 5	3:07
6.	"Ikaw Na Na (Minus One)"	Gimme 5	3:24

== Filmography ==
=== Film ===
Year	Title	Role
2017	Love You to the Stars and Back	Vincent

=== TV series ===
Year	Title	Role
2013	Muling Buksan ang Puso	Leonel Beltran (young)
2013	Luv U	Skater
2014	Wansapanataym: Perfecto	Bryan
2015	Bagito	Warren
2015	Maalaala Mo Kaya: Pagkain	Mai's Love Interest
2015	Maalaala Mo Kaya: Rubber Shoes	Friend
2016	Wansapanataym: That's My Toy, That's My Boy	Marky
2016	Maalaala Mo Kaya: Motorsiklo	Ronald
2016	Maalaala Mo Kaya: Popcorn	Justine
2016	Maalaala Mo Kaya: Mikropono	Pfizer

=== Variety shows ===
Year	Title	Notes	Ref.
2014	ASAP	2014–c. 2015, Performer	
2014	Gandang Gabi, Vice!	Special guests	
2014	It's Showtime	Special guests	
