= Dreamscape Entertainment =

Philippine television production company

- Formerly: Dreamscape Entertainment Television (1992–2019)
- Type: Division
- Industry: Television production Film production
- Genre: Philippine telenovelas
- Founded: August 17, 1992; 34 years ago
- Founder: Roldeo T. Endrinal (d. February 3, 2024)
- Headquarters: ABS-CBN Broadcasting Center, Sgt. Esguerra Avenue corner Mother Ignacia Street, South Triangle, Diliman, Quezon City, Metro Manila, Philippines
- Area served: Worldwide
- Key people: Kylie Manalo-Balagtas; Rondel P. Lindayag; Eric John Salut; Carlina Dela Merced
- Products: Television programs Film production Content provider
- Owner: ABS-CBN Corporation
- Parent: ABS-CBN Studios
- Divisions: Dreamscape Digital

Dreamscape Entertainment is a Philippine television production and entertainment company of ABS-CBN Studios, a division of ABS-CBN Corporation, that supplies teleseryes for its namesake television network ABS-CBN, and sister channels and online platforms. It was founded on August 17, 1992, by the late Roldeo T. Endrinal where he served as its head for almost 32 years until his death on February 3, 2024.

While the main ABS-CBN network is currently off the air due to the expired broadcast franchise, Dreamscape Entertainment produces series on Kapamilya Channel (main ad interim replacement network), A2Z (airtime lease agreement with ZOE Broadcasting Network, Inc.), Kapamilya Online Live (web-based channel), TV5 (content agreement with MediaQuest Holdings; since March 8, 2021), GMA Network (for Unbreak My Heart), iWant and TFC (streaming platform and international channel), as well as All TV (content and licensing agreement with Advanced Media Broadcasting System; since April 15, 2024), Jeepney TV, Cine Mo!, Viu, Amazon Prime Video, Netflix, WeTV iflix and iQIYI distributed by ABS-CBN Studios. While it started producing television dramas in 1992, Dreamscape only began to identify themselves in January 2013 to distinguish from Star Creatives (a division of Star Creatives Group, which also managed Star Cinema), another drama production unit of ABS-CBN Studios founded in 1997.

On August 15, 2019, the production company shortened its name and logo from "Dreamscape Entertainment Television" to simply "Dreamscape Entertainment". However, the former continued to be used on some uses until the cast reveal of Batang Quiapo in 2023.

== List of series produced by Dreamscape Entertainment ==
=== 1990s ===
Logo as Dreamscape Entertainment Television that was first used on January 14, 2013, when it began identify themselves to distinguish from Star Creatives (then known as Star Television from 1997 to 2014), another drama production unit of ABS-CBN Studios.

Title	Cast	Episodes	First aired	Last aired	Genre
Mara Clara	Judy Ann Santos, Gladys Reyes, Juan Rodrigo, Beverly Vergel, Susan Africa, Dan Fernandez, Wowie de Guzman, Rico Yan	1,130	August 17, 1992	February 14, 1997	Drama
Maalaala Mo Kaya	various		1995	2001	Drama, Anthology
Mula sa Puso	Claudine Barretto, Rico Yan, Diether Ocampo, Princess Punzalan	538	March 10, 1997	April 9, 1999	Melodrama, Action, Suspense, Crime, Romance
Wansapanataym	various	792	June 22, 1997	February 27, 2005	Fantasy, Anthology
Wansapanataym	various	792	September 11, 2010	April 7, 2019	Fantasy, Anthology
Marinella	Camille Prats, Shaina Magdayao, Serena Dalrymple, Rita Avila, Hilda Koronel, Rio Locsin	576	February 8, 1999	May 11, 2001	Drama
Saan Ka Man Naroroon	Claudine Barretto, Rico Yan, Diether Ocampo, Gladys Reyes, Carlos Agassi, Cherry Pie Picache	510	April 12, 1999	March 23, 2001	Drama

=== 2000s ===
Title	Cast	Episodes	First aired	Last aired	Genre
Sa Dulo ng Walang Hanggan	Claudine Barretto, Luis Alandy, Carlos Agassi, Mylene Dizon	505	March 26, 2001	February 28, 2003	Melodrama, Romance
Mga Anghel na Walang Langit	Nikki Bagaporo, Carl John Barrameda, Miles Ocampo, Sharlene San Pedro, John Manalo, Johnny Delgado	210	May 9, 2005	February 24, 2006	Melodrama
Gulong ng Palad	Kristine Hermosa, TJ Trinidad, Cherie Gil, Andrea del Rosario	88	January 9, 2006	May 12, 2006	Drama
Komiks	various	145	February 4, 2006	August 8, 2009	Fantasy, Anthology
Your Song	various	239	February 12, 2006	March 27, 2011	Drama, Anthology
Sana Maulit Muli	Kim Chiu, Gerald Anderson, Erich Gonzales, Jake Cuenca	73	January 8, 2007	April 20, 2007	Melodrama, Romance
Walang Kapalit	Claudine Barretto, Piolo Pascual, Jodi Sta. Maria	95	April 23, 2007	August 31, 2007	Melodrama, Romance
Margarita	Wendy Valdez, Bruce Quebral, Diether Ocampo	40	July 30, 2007	September 21, 2007	Drama
Pangarap na Bituin	Sarah Geronimo, Rica Peralejo, Maja Salvador, Jericho Rosales, Jay-R Siaboc, Nikki Gil	70	September 3, 2007	December 7, 2007	Drama, Musical
Mars Ravelo's Lastikman	Vhong Navarro, Iya Villania, Cherie Gil, Dawn Zulueta, Pokwang, Ian Veneracion, John Estrada	89	September 24, 2007	January 25, 2008	Fantasy, Action, Drama, Comedy
Princess Sarah (based on the Japanese anime series of the same title)	Sharlene San Pedro, Albert Martinez, Sheryl Cruz, Candy Pangilinan, Sophia Baars	30	November 12, 2007	December 21, 2007	Drama, Fantasy
Palos	Cesar Montano, Jake Cuenca, Roxanne Guinoo, Wendy Valdez	62	January 28, 2008	April 24, 2008	Drama, Action, Thriller
Kung Fu Kids	Jairus Aquino, Joseph Andre Garcia, Eliza Pineda, Sharlene San Pedro Paul Salas, Jane Oineza, Kristofer Martin, Joshua Dionisio	63	January 28, 2008	April 25, 2008	Adventure, Fantasy, Comedy
My Girl (based on the Korean drama of the same title)	Kim Chiu, Gerald Anderson, Enchong Dee, Niña Jose, Ronaldo Valdez	75	May 26, 2008	September 5, 2008	Romantic comedy
Iisa Pa Lamang	Claudine Barretto, Diether Ocampo, Gabby Concepcion, Angelica Panganiban, Susan Roces, Cherry Pie Picache	85	July 14, 2008	November 7, 2008	Melodrama, Romance, Suspense
I Love Betty La Fea (based on the Colombian telenovela Yo soy Betty, la fea)	Bea Alonzo, John Lloyd Cruz, Vhong Navarro, Megan Young, Ronaldo Valdez, Sam Concepcion, Sheryn Regis, Ai-Ai delas Alas, Ruffa Gutierrez, Wendy Valdez, Joem Bascon, Thou Reyes	163	September 8, 2008	April 24, 2009	Drama, Romantic comedy
Pieta	Ryan Agoncillo, Cherie Gil	133	October 27, 2008	May 1, 2009	Drama, Crime
Tayong Dalawa	Kim Chiu, Gerald Anderson, Jake Cuenca, Coco Martin, Agot Isidro, Cherry Pie Picache	178	January 19, 2009	September 25, 2009	Romance, Melodrama, Action
May Bukas Pa (based on the 1955 Spanish film Miracle of Marcelino and 1981 Christian anime Superbook, and revival series of the 2000–2001 series of the same name)	Zaijian Jaranilla, Albert Martinez, Dina Bonnevie, Tonton Gutierrez, Maja Salvador, Rayver Cruz, Dominic Ochoa, Precious Lara Quigaman, Desiree del Valle, Lito Pimentel, Jaime Fabregas	263 + 1 deleted scene	February 2, 2009	February 5, 2010 (Note: Original broadcast cut version on ABS-CBN.)	Drama, Fantasy
May Bukas Pa (based on the 1955 Spanish film Miracle of Marcelino and 1981 Christian anime Superbook, and revival series of the 2000–2001 series of the same name)	Zaijian Jaranilla, Albert Martinez, Dina Bonnevie, Tonton Gutierrez, Maja Salvador, Rayver Cruz, Dominic Ochoa, Precious Lara Quigaman, Desiree del Valle, Lito Pimentel, Jaime Fabregas	263 + 1 deleted scene	July 2012	December 5, 2013 (Note: Extended and clean feed version on TFC online (some episodes) and continued to TV through Jeepney TV from March 11, 2013.)	Drama, Fantasy
Kambal sa Uma	Melissa Ricks, Shaina Magdayao, Matt Evans, Jason Abalos, Gina Alajar	125	April 20, 2009	October 9, 2009	Melodrama, Romance, Science fiction
Agimat: Ang Mga Alamat ni Ramon Revilla	various	96	August 15, 2009	March 18, 2011	Anthology, Drama
Katorse	Erich Gonzales, Ejay Falcon, Enchong Dee, Xian Lim	100	August 24, 2009	January 8, 2010	Teen drama, Romance
Nagsimula sa Puso	Maja Salvador, Coco Martin, Nikki Gil, Jason Abalos	75	October 12, 2009	January 22, 2010	Melodrama, Romance

=== 2010s ===
Title	Cast	Episodes	First aired	Last aired	Genre
Tanging Yaman	Rowell Santiago, Agot Isidro, Erich Gonzales, Enchong Dee, Ejay Falcon, Melissa Ricks, Matt Evans	92	January 11, 2010	May 21, 2010	Political drama, Romance
Kung Tayo'y Magkakalayo	Kris Aquino, Kim Chiu, Gerald Anderson, Coco Martin, Gabby Concepcion, Albert Martinez	122	January 18, 2010	July 9, 2010	Romance, Melodrama, Action
Agua Bendita	Andi Eigenmann, Matteo Guidicelli, Jason Abalos, Dimples Romana	147	February 8, 2010	September 3, 2010	Drama, Fantasy, Romance
Rubi (based on the Mexican telenovela of the same title)	Angelica Panganiban, Diether Ocampo, Jake Cuenca, Shaina Magdayao	127	February 15, 2010	August 13, 2010	Romance, Drama
Momay	Xyriel Manabat, Maliksig Morales, Ejay Falcon, Lorna Tolentino, Glydel Mercado	85	May 24, 2010	September 17, 2010	Drama, Fantasy
Precious Heart Romances: Impostor	Sam Milby, Maja Salvador, Melai Cantiveros, Jason Francisco, Precious Lara Quigaman	90	May 17, 2010	September 17, 2010	Drama, Romance, Horror
Noah	Piolo Pascual, Zaijan Jaranilla, Jodi Sta. Maria, Xyriel Manabat, Cherry Pie Picache, Kristine Hermosa, Tessie Tomas	149	July 12, 2010	February 4, 2011	Drama, Fantasy
1DOL	Sarah Geronimo, Sam Milby, Coco Martin	35	September 6, 2010	October 22, 2010	Drama, Musical
Mara Clara	Kathryn Bernardo, Julia Montes, Mylene Dizon, Bobby Andrews, Dimples Romana, Jhong Hilario, Albie Casiño, John Manalo, Diego Loyzaga, Gina Pareño	158	October 25, 2010	June 3, 2011	Drama, Family
Sabel	Jessy Mendiola, AJ Perez, Joseph Marco, Rita Avila	70	December 6, 2010	March 11, 2011	Drama, Romance
Mutya	Mutya Orquia, Jairus Aquino, Precious Lara Quigaman, Alfred Vargas	68	January 31, 2011	May 6, 2011	Fantasy, Drama
Green Rose (based on the Korean drama of the same title)	Anne Curtis, Jericho Rosales, Jake Cuenca, Alessandra de Rossi	73	February 14, 2011	May 27, 2011	Melodrama, Romance, Suspense, Action
Minsan Lang Kita Iibigin	Coco Martin, Maja Salvador, Andi Eigenmann, Martin del Rosario	118	March 7, 2011	August 19, 2011	Action, Melodrama, Romance
Mula sa Puso	Lauren Young, JM de Guzman, Enrique Gil, Dawn Zulueta, Ariel Rivera, Eula Valdez	98	March 28, 2011	August 12, 2011	Action, Melodrama, Romance
100 Days to Heaven	Coney Reyes, Jodi Sta. Maria, Xyriel Manabat	140	May 9, 2011	November 18, 2011	Drama, Fantasy
My Binondo Girl	Kim Chiu, Xian Lim, Jolo Revilla, Matteo Guidicelli	110	August 22, 2011	January 20, 2012	Drama, Romantic comedy
Growing Up	Kathryn Bernardo, Julia Montes, Daniel Padilla, Diego Loyzaga, Kiray Celis, EJ Jallorina, Neil Coleta, Yen Santos	24	September 4, 2011	February 12, 2012	Teen drama
Nasaan Ka Elisa? (based on Telemundo's adaptation of the Chilean telenovela ¿Dónde está Elisa?)	Melissa Ricks, Agot Isidro, Albert Martinez, Joem Bascon, Vina Morales, Eric Fructuoso, Mickey Ferriols, Christopher Roxas, Desiree del Valle	90	September 12, 2011	January 13, 2012	Mystery, Drama, Thriller, Crime
Budoy	Gerald Anderson, Jessy Mendiola, Enrique Gil	110	October 10, 2011	March 9, 2012	Drama
Ikaw ay Pag-Ibig	Zaijian Jaranilla, Xyriel Manabat, Mutya Orquia, Louise Abuel	50	November 21, 2011	January 27, 2012	Drama, Fantasy
Walang Hanggan	Coco Martin, Julia Montes, Dawn Zulueta, Richard Gomez, Helen Gamboa, Susan Roces, Paulo Avelino, Melissa Ricks, Joem Bascon, Rita Avila, Nonie Buencamino, Eula Valdez	203	January 16, 2012	October 26, 2012	Romance, Melodrama
Dahil sa Pag-ibig	Piolo Pascual, Jericho Rosales, Cristine Reyes, Maricar Reyes, Christopher de Leon	78	March 12, 2012	June 29, 2012	Melodrama
Kung Ako'y Iiwan Mo	Shaina Magdayao, Jake Cuenca, Bangs Garcia, Ron Morales	152	April 16, 2012	November 16, 2012	Melodrama, Romance
Aryana	Ella Cruz, Pokwang, Francis Magundayao, Paul Salas, Dominic Roque, Michelle Vito, Tonton Gutierrez, G. Toengi, Desiree del Valle	189	May 7, 2012	January 25, 2013	Drama, Fantasy
Lorenzo's Time	Zaijan Jaranilla, Carmina Villarroel	70	July 2, 2012	October 5, 2012	Melodrama
Ina, Kapatid, Anak	Kim Chiu, Maja Salvador, Xian Lim, Enchong Dee	178	October 8, 2012	June 14, 2013	Drama, Family, Romance
May Isang Pangarap	Larah Claire Sabroso, Julia Klarisse Base, Vina Morales, Carmina Villarroel	83	January 21, 2013	May 17, 2013	Drama, Musical, Family, Comedy
Kailangan Ko'y Ikaw	Kris Aquino, Anne Curtis, Robin Padilla	63	January 21, 2013	April 19, 2013	Melodrama, Romance, Action
Kahit Konting Pagtingin	Angeline Quinto, Paulo Avelino, Sam Milby	53	January 28, 2013	April 12, 2013	Drama, Romantic comedy
Juan dela Cruz	Coco Martin, Erich Gonzales, Shaina Magdayao, Arron Villaflor, Albert Martinez, Zsa Zsa Padilla, Joel Torre, Gina Pareño, Eddie Garcia, Neil Coleta, Louise Abuel, Diana Zubiri	188	February 4, 2013	October 25, 2013	Drama, Fantasy, Action, Horror
My Little Juan	Izzy Canillo, Jaime Fabregas	85	May 20, 2013	September 13, 2013	Drama, Fantasy, Horror
Huwag Ka Lang Mawawala	Judy Ann Santos, Sam Milby, KC Concepcion, John Estrada	50	June 17, 2013	August 23, 2013	Melodrama, Revenge, Action
Muling Buksan ang Puso	Julia Montes, Enrique Gil, Enchong Dee	65	July 8, 2013	October 4, 2013	Romance, Melodrama
Bukas na Lang Kita Mamahalin	Gerald Anderson, Dawn Zulueta, Cristine Reyes, Diana Zubiri, Rayver Cruz, Tonton Gutierrez, Dina Bonnevie	55	September 2, 2013	November 15, 2013	Melodrama, Action
Honesto	Raikko Mateo, Paulo Avelino, Janice de Belen, Eddie Garcia, Joel Torre, Angel Aquino, Nonie Buencamino, Melissa Ricks, Joseph Marco, Cristine Reyes	100	October 28, 2013	March 14, 2014	Drama, Fantasy
Ikaw Lamang	Kim Chiu, Coco Martin, Julia Montes, Jake Cuenca, KC Concepcion	162	March 10, 2014	October 24, 2014	Romance, Melodrama, Historical fiction
Dyesebel	Anne Curtis, Gerald Anderson, Sam Milby, Andi Eigenmann	87	March 17, 2014	July 18, 2014	Drama, Fantasy
Mirabella	Julia Barretto, Enrique Gil, Sam Concepcion, Mika dela Cruz	73	March 24, 2014	July 4, 2014	Melodrama, Fantasy, Romance, Revenge
Sana Bukas pa ang Kahapon	Bea Alonzo, Paulo Avelino, Albert Martinez, Maricar Reyes	84	June 16, 2014	October 10, 2014	Melodrama, Romance, Mystery
Bagito	Nash Aguas, Alexa Ilacad, Ella Cruz, Ariel Rivera, Angel Aquino, Agot Isidro	83	November 17, 2014	March 13, 2015	Drama, Coming of age, Romance
Give Love on Christmas	various	35	December 1, 2014	January 16, 2015	Drama, Anthology
Inday Bote	Alex Gonzaga, Alonzo Muhlach, Matteo Guidicelli, Kean Cipriano, Aiko Melendez	53	March 16, 2015	May 29, 2015	Drama, Fantasy, Romance
Nathaniel	Marco Masa, Gerald Anderson, Shaina Magdayao	115	April 20, 2015	September 25, 2015	Fantasy, Drama
On the Wings of Love	Nadine Lustre, James Reid	145	August 10, 2015	February 26, 2016	Romantic comedy
Doble Kara	Julia Montes, Carmina Villarroel, Mylene Dizon, Ariel Rivera, Allen Dizon, Sam Milby, Edgar Allan Guzman, Maxene Magalona, Krystal Mejes, Myel de Leon	381	August 24, 2015	February 10, 2017	Drama
FPJ's Ang Probinsyano	Coco Martin	1,696	September 28, 2015	August 12, 2022	Action, Drama, Thriller
And I Love You So	Julia Barretto, Miles Ocampo, Dimples Romana, Angel Aquino	70	December 7, 2015	March 11, 2016	Drama, Romance, Family
My Super D	Dominic Ochoa, Marco Masa, Bianca Manalo, Marvin Agustin	64	April 18, 2016	July 15, 2016	Fantasy, Drama, Action
Born for You	Janella Salvador, Elmo Magalona	65	June 20, 2016	September 16, 2016	Drama, Romantic comedy
Till I Met You	Nadine Lustre, James Reid	105	August 29, 2016	January 20, 2017	Drama, Romantic comedy
My Dear Heart	Heart Ramos, Coney Reyes, Zanjoe Marudo, Bela Padilla, Ria Atayde	103	January 23, 2017	June 16, 2017	Drama, Fantasy
Ikaw Lang ang Iibigin	Kim Chiu, Gerald Anderson, Jake Cuenca, Coleen Garcia	195	May 1, 2017	January 26, 2018	Drama, Romance
The Promise of Forever	Paulo Avelino, Ritz Azul, Ejay Falcon	55	September 11, 2017	November 24, 2017	Drama, Romance, Fantasy
The Good Son	Joshua Garcia, Jerome Ponce, Loisa Andalio, McCoy de Leon, Elisse Joson, Nash Aguas, Alexa Ilacad, Mylene Dizon, Eula Valdez, John Estrada	143	September 25, 2017	April 13, 2018	Drama, Family, Mystery, Crime
Asintado	Julia Montes, Shaina Magdayao, Paulo Avelino, Aljur Abrenica	187	January 15, 2018	October 5, 2018	Drama, Action, Thriller
The Blood Sisters	Erich Gonzales, Enchong Dee, Ejay Falcon, Jake Cuenca	132	February 12, 2018	August 17, 2018	Drama, Suspense
Since I Found You	Piolo Pascual, Arci Muñoz, JC de Vera, Alessandra de Rossi, Empoy	85	April 16, 2018	August 10, 2018	Romance, Drama
bloomfield Academy	Zanjoe Marudo, Susan Roces, Angel Aquino, Maris Racal, Ronnie Alonte, Sam Milby	195	July 11, 2018	April 5, 2019	Drama, Family
Kadenang Ginto	Andrea Brillantes, Francine Diaz, Beauty Gonzalez, Dimples Romana, Kyle Echarri, Seth Fedelin, Albert Martinez, Richard Yap, Joko Diaz	348	October 8, 2018	February 7, 2020	Drama, Family
The General's Daughter	Angel Locsin, Tirso Cruz III, Albert Martinez, Eula Valdez, Janice de Belen, Paulo Avelino, JC de Vera, Ryza Cenon, Arjo Atayde, Maricel Soriano	183	January 21, 2019	October 4, 2019	Action, Drama
Hiwaga ng Kambat	Grae Fernandez, Edward Barber, Maymay Entrata, Chanty	19	April 21, 2019	August 25, 2019	Drama, Horror, Fantasy
Sino ang Maysala?: Mea Culpa	Jodi Sta. Maria, Bela Padilla, Ketchup Eusebio, Tony Labrusca, Kit Thompson, Sandino Martin, Ivana Alawi	75	April 29, 2019	August 9, 2019	Drama, Crime, Thriller
Parasite Island	Rafael Rosell, Bernard Palanca, Michael Flores, Desiree del Valle, Bianca Manalo, Ria Atayde, Liza Lorena	13	September 8, 2019	December 1, 2019	Drama, Horror
Sandugo	Ejay Falcon, Aljur Abrenica, Elisse Joson, Jessy Mendiola, Cherry Pie Picache, Vina Morales, Ariel Rivera, Gardo Versoza	125	September 30, 2019	March 20, 2020	Action, Drama, Family
Starla	Judy Ann Santos, Enzo Pelojero, Jana Agoncillo, Joel Torre, Raymart Santiago, Meryll Soriano, Joem Bascon	70	October 7, 2019	January 10, 2020	Drama, Fantasy
The Haunted	Shaina Magdayao, Jake Cuenca, Denise Laurel, Queenzy Calma	10	December 8, 2019	February 9, 2020	Drama, Horror

=== 2020s ===
Title	Cast	Episodes	First aired	Last aired	Genre
Love Thy Woman	Kim Chiu, Xian Lim, Yam Concepcion	95	February 10, 2020	September 11, 2020	Melodrama, Romance
24/7	Julia Montes, Arjo Atayde, Melissa Ricks, Joem Bascon, Edu Manzano	4	February 23, 2020	March 15, 2020	Drama, Action, Mystery, Thriller
Walang Hanggang Paalam	Angelica Panganiban, Paulo Avelino, Zanjoe Marudo, Arci Muñoz	143	September 28, 2020	April 16, 2021	Melodrama, Family, Action, Crime
Huwag Kang Mangamba	Andrea Brillantes, Francine Diaz, Kyle Echarri, Seth Fedelin	168	March 22, 2021	November 12, 2021	Drama, Religious, Crime
La Vida Lena	Erich Gonzales, Carlo Aquino, JC de Vera, Kit Thompson	160	June 28, 2021	February 4, 2022	Drama, Revenge
Marry Me, Marry You	Janine Gutierrez, Paulo Avelino	95	September 13, 2021	January 21, 2022	Romantic comedy, Drama
The Broken Marriage Vow (based on the British drama Doctor Foster)	Jodi Sta. Maria, Zanjoe Marudo, Sue Ramirez, Zaijian Jaranilla	107	January 24, 2022	June 24, 2022	Psychological thriller, Drama
Love in 40 Days	Ronnie Alonte, Loisa Andalio	110	May 30, 2022	October 28, 2022	Romantic comedy, Drama
Flower of Evil (based on the Korean drama of the same name)	Piolo Pascual, Lovi Poe	32	June 25, 2022	October 9, 2022	Psychological thriller, Crime, Suspense, Melodrama
Dirty Linen	Janine Gutierrez, Zanjoe Marudo, Francine Diaz, Seth Fedelin	153	January 23, 2023	August 25, 2023	Mystery, Crime, Thriller, Suspense, Revenge
FPJ's Batang Quiapo	Coco Martin	799	February 13, 2023	March 13, 2026	Action, Crime, Drama
Unbreak My Heart	Jodi Sta. Maria, Richard Yap, Gabbi Garcia, Joshua Garcia	100	May 29, 2023	November 16, 2023	Romantic drama
Pira-Pirasong Paraiso	Loisa Andalio, Ronnie Alonte, Alexa Ilacad, KD Estrada, Charlie Dizon, Joseph Marco, Elisse Joson	161	July 25, 2023	January 27, 2024	Thriller, Action, Drama
Senior High	Andrea Brillantes, Kyle Echarri, Zaijan Jaranilla, Xyriel Manabat, Juan Karlos Labajo, Elijah Canlas, Daniela Stranner, Miggy Jimenez, Tommy Alejandrino, Gela Atayde	105	August 28, 2023	January 19, 2024	Teen drama, Mystery, Thriller
Linlang: The Teleserye Version	Kim Chiu, Paulo Avelino, JM de Guzman, Maricel Soriano	103	January 22, 2024	June 14, 2024	Thriller drama
High Street	Andrea Brillantes, Juan Karlos Labajo, Zaijan Jaranilla, Xyriel Manabat, Elijah Canlas, Daniela Stranner, Miggy Jimenez, Tommy Alejandrino, Gela Atayde, Angel Aquino, Romnick Sarmenta, Dimples Romana	80	May 13, 2024	August 30, 2024	Mystery, Drama, Thriller
Pamilya Sagrado	Piolo Pascual, Kyle Echarri, Grae Fernandez, Tirso Cruz III, John Arcilla, Joel Torre, Mylene Dizon, Rosanna Roces, Aiko Melendez, Shaina Magdayao	110	June 17, 2024	November 15, 2024	Drama, Crime, Action
Lavender Fields	Jodi Sta. Maria, Janine Gutierrez, Jericho Rosales, Albert Martinez, Edu Manzano, Jolina Magdangal, Maricel Soriano	100	September 2, 2024	January 17, 2025	Action drama
Saving Grace: The Untold Story (based on the Japanese drama Mother)	Julia Montes, Zia Grace, Sharon Cuneta	78	March 3, 2025	June 20, 2025	Drama
The Alibi: Ang Buong Katotohanan	Kim Chiu, Paulo Avelino	93	March 16, 2026	July 24, 2026	Romantic thriller
Roja	Donny Pangilinan, Kyle Echarri	80	November 24, 2025	March 13, 2026	Action drama
Sigabo	Coco Martin, Julia Montes	TBA	June 22, 2026	TBA	Romantic comedy, Action
Someone, Someday	Kathryn Bernardo, James Reid, Maja Salvador	90	July 27, 2026	November 27, 2026	Romantic thriller, Mystery

== Gallery ==
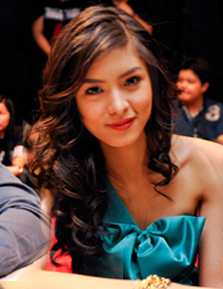
Kim Chiu

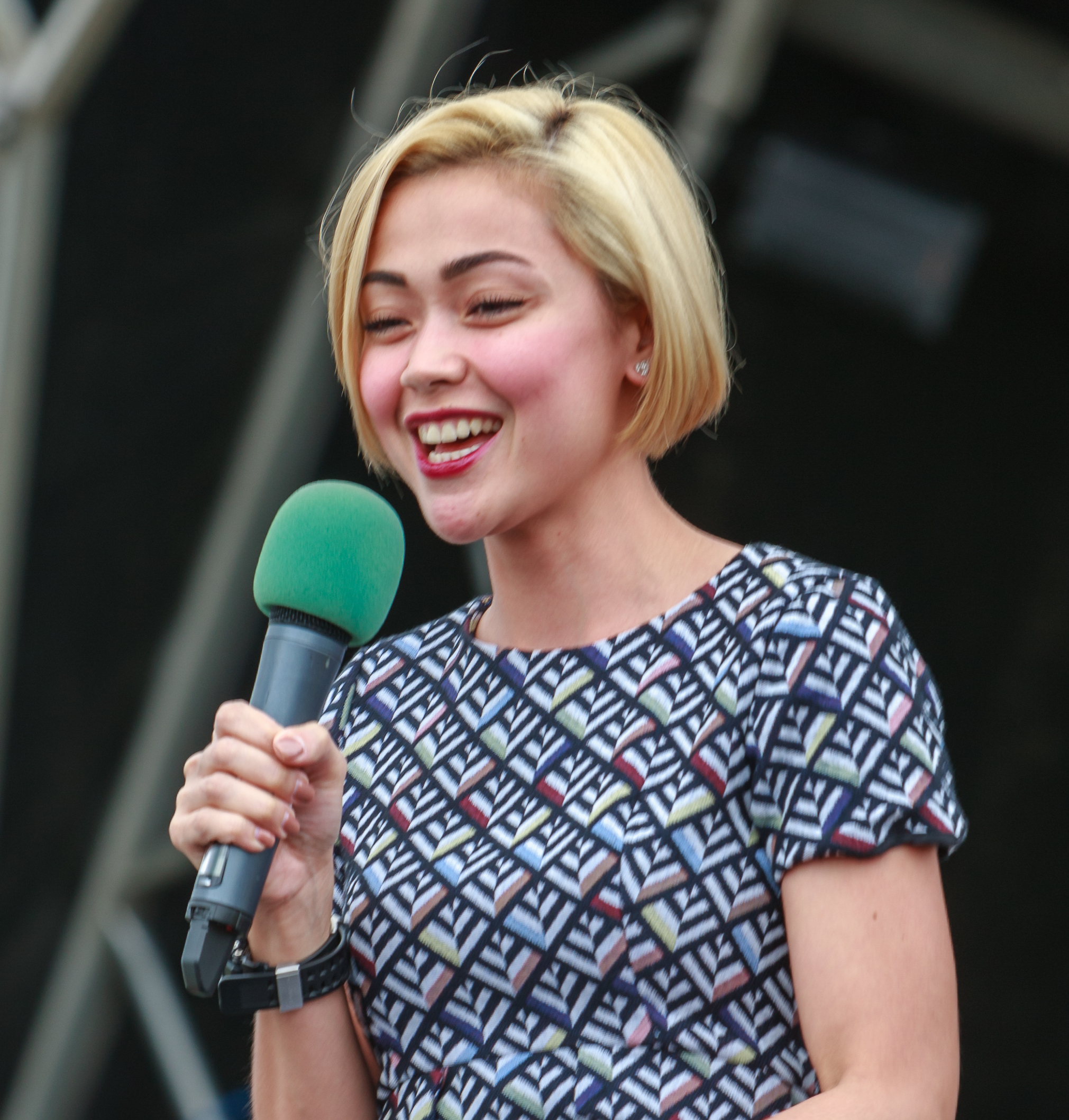
Jodi Sta. Maria

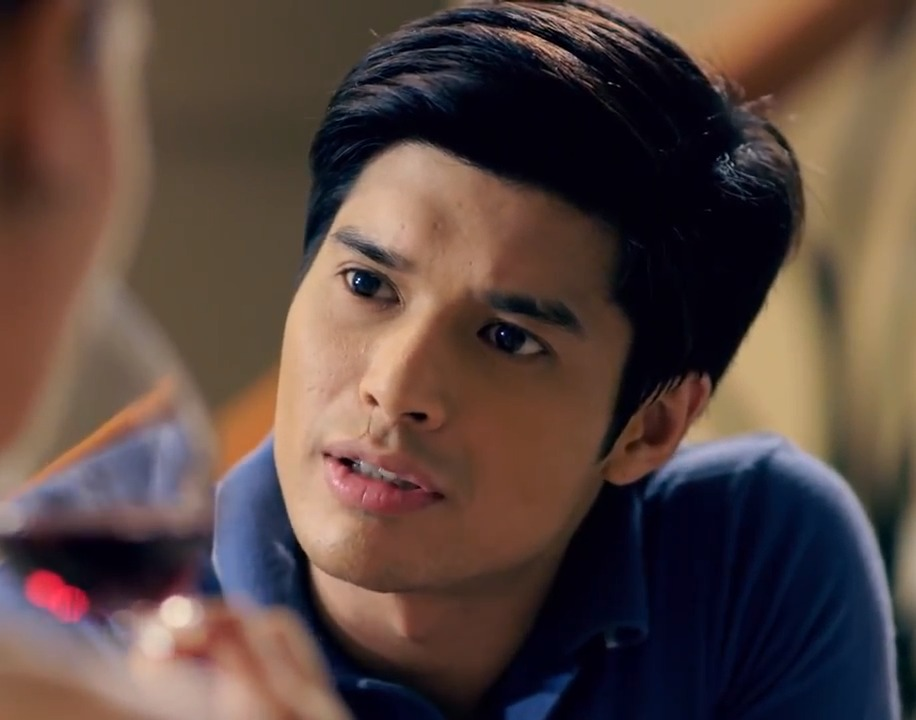
JC de Vera

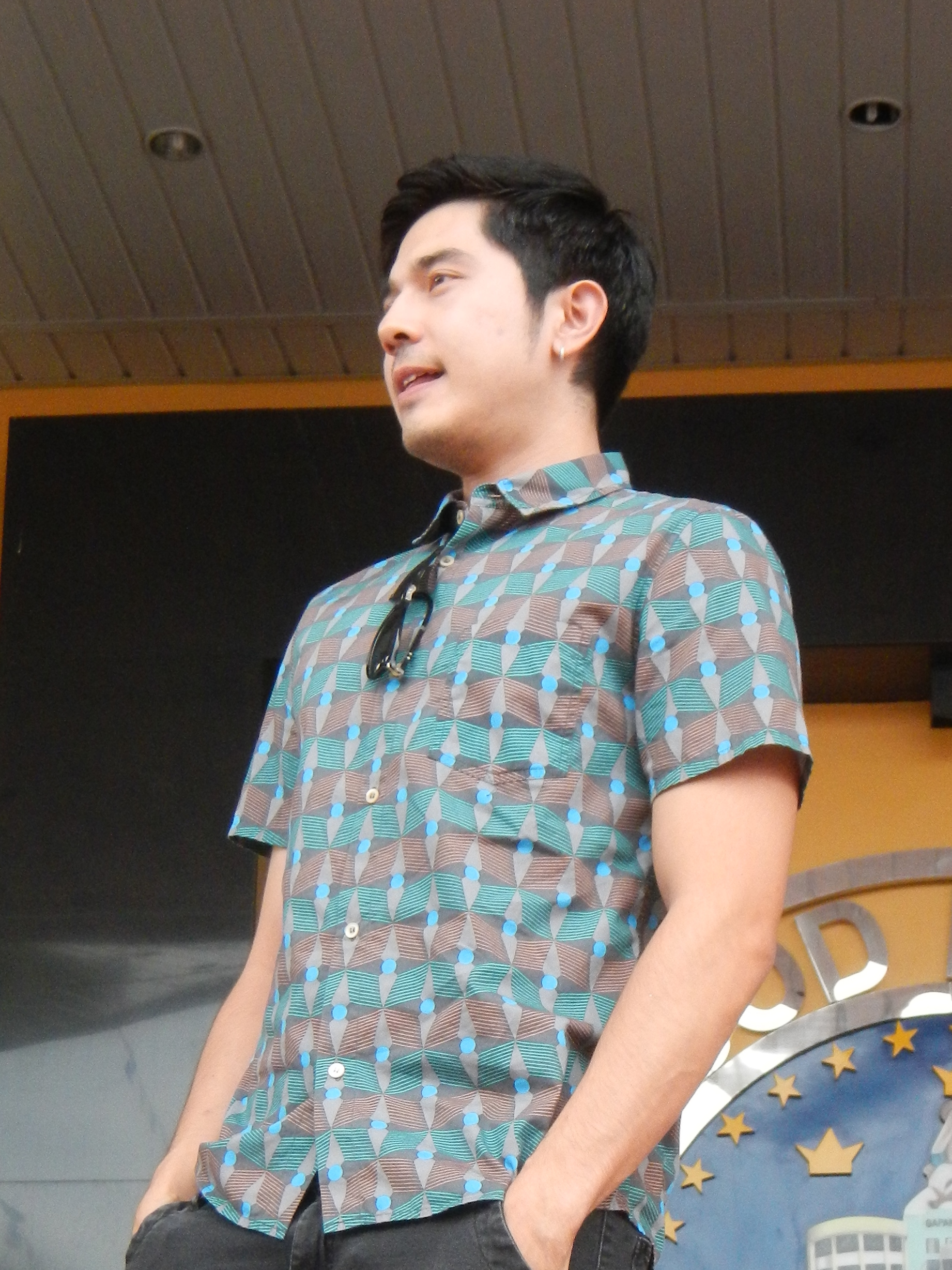
Paulo Avelino

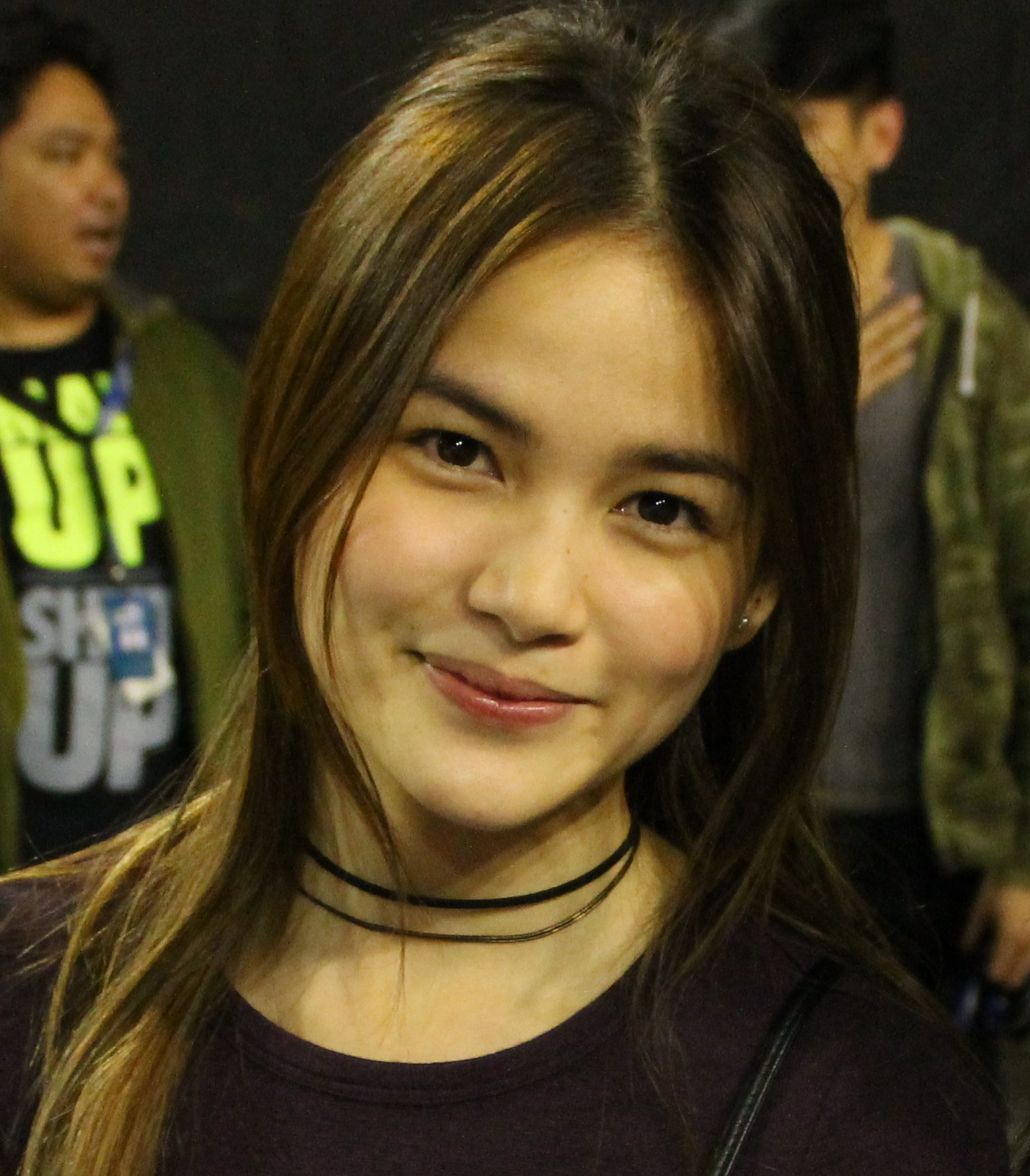
Elisse Joson

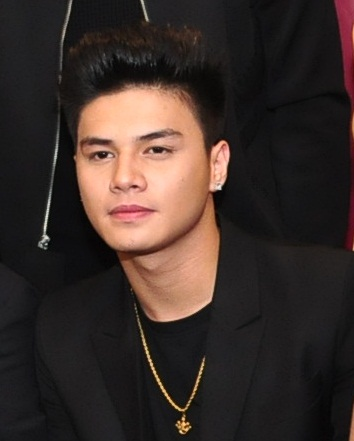
Ronnie Alonte

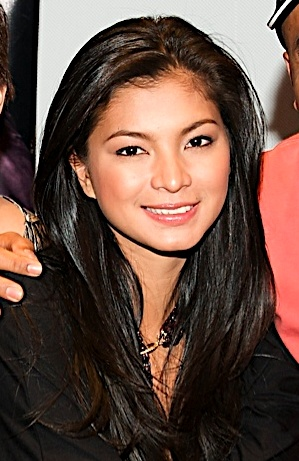
Angel Locsin

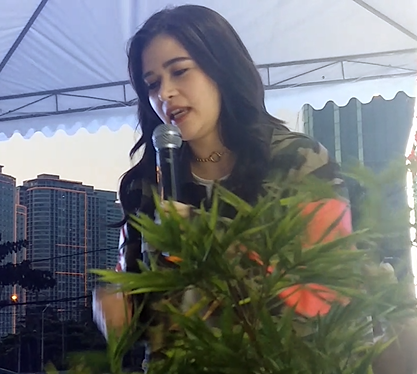
Bela Padilla

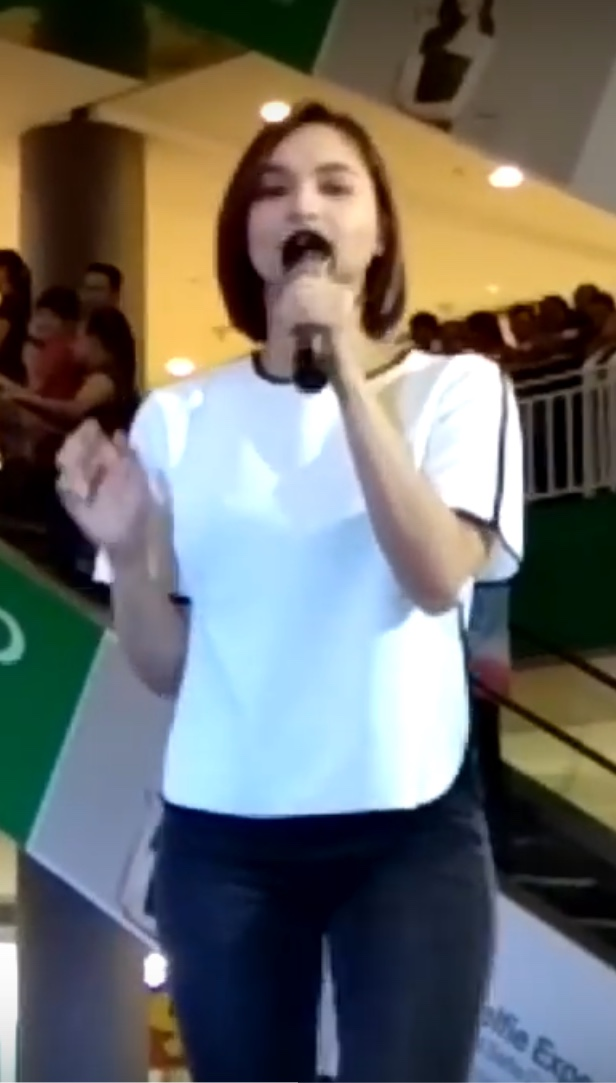
Ryza Cenon

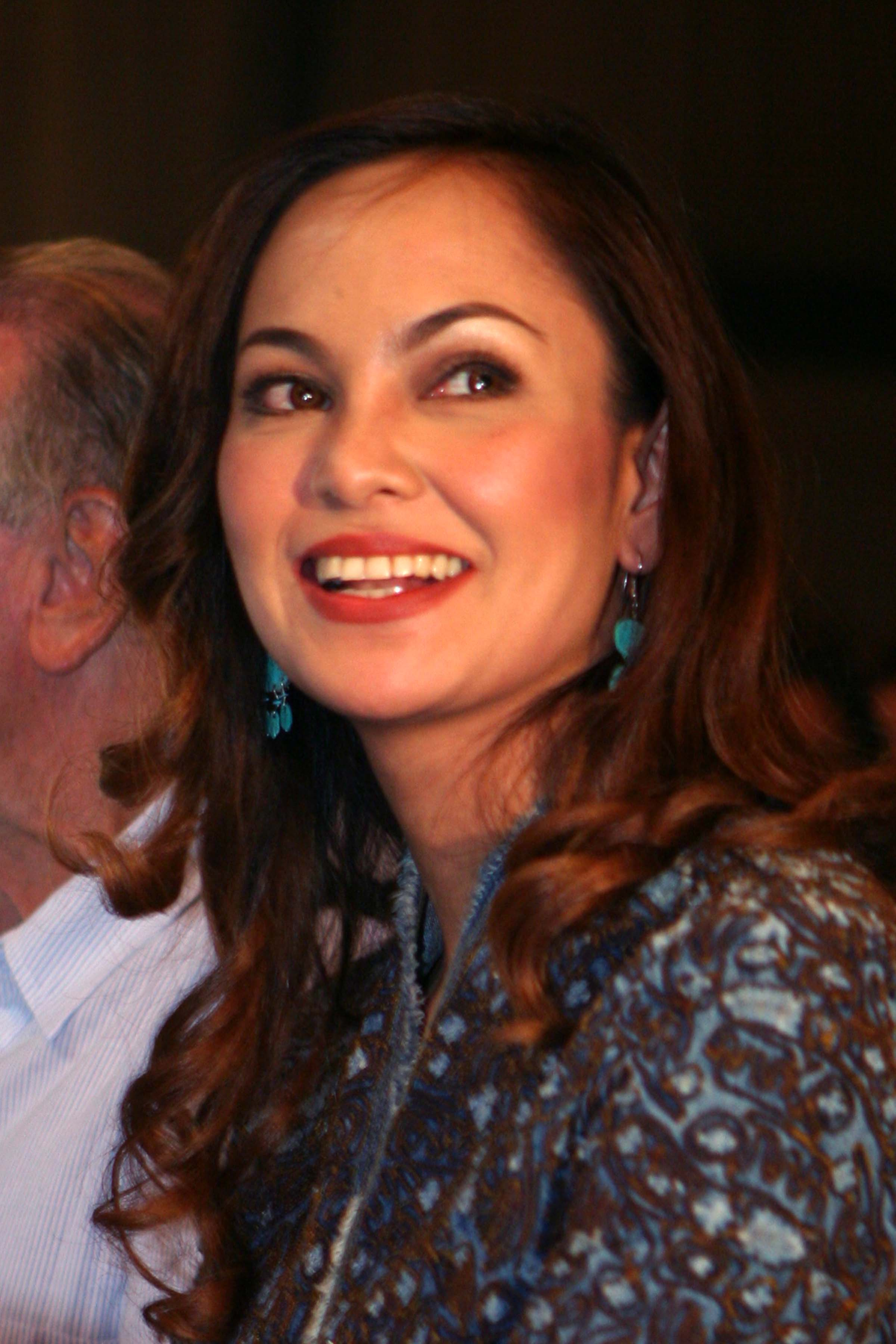
Eula Valdes

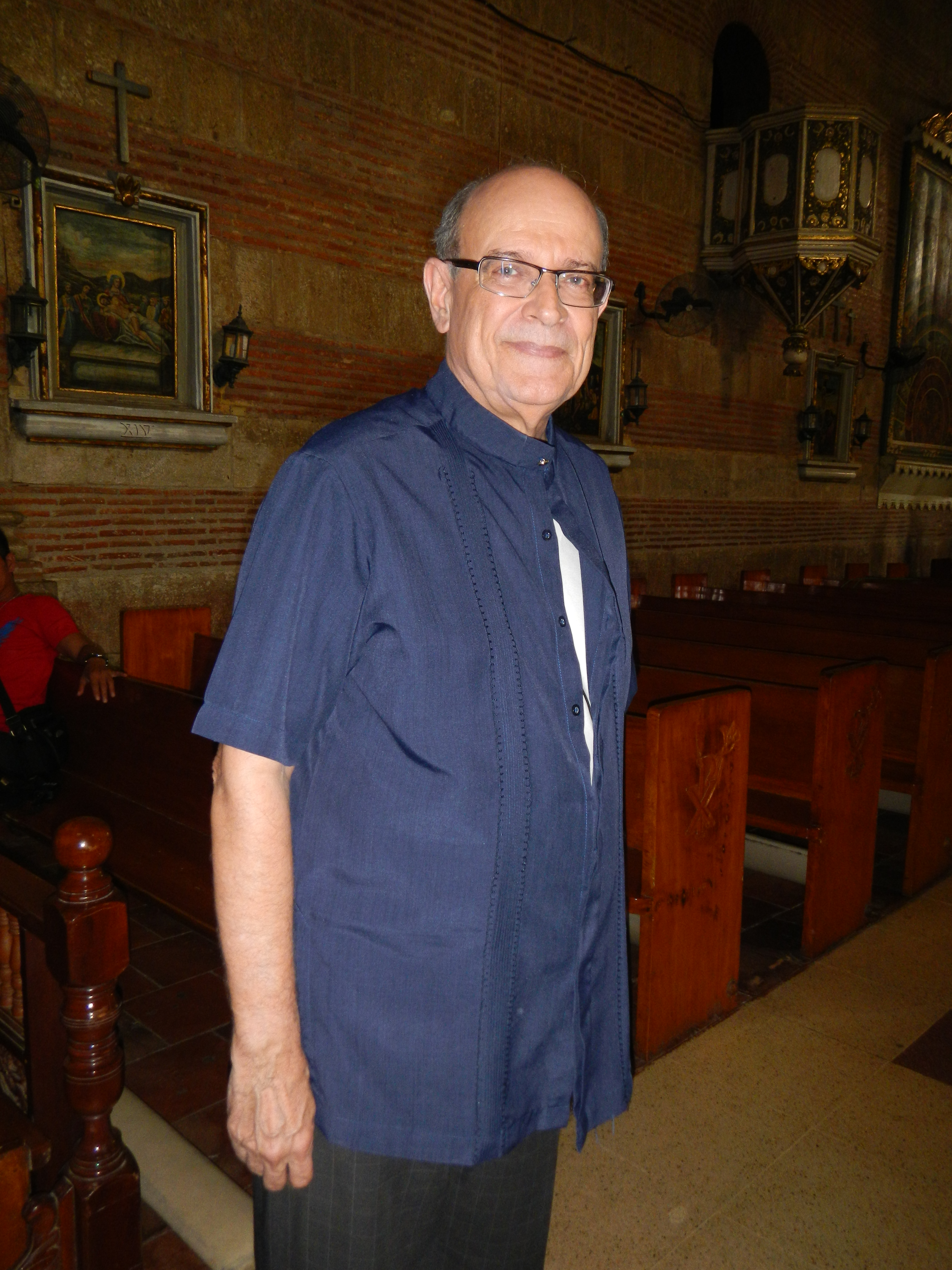
Jaime Fabregas

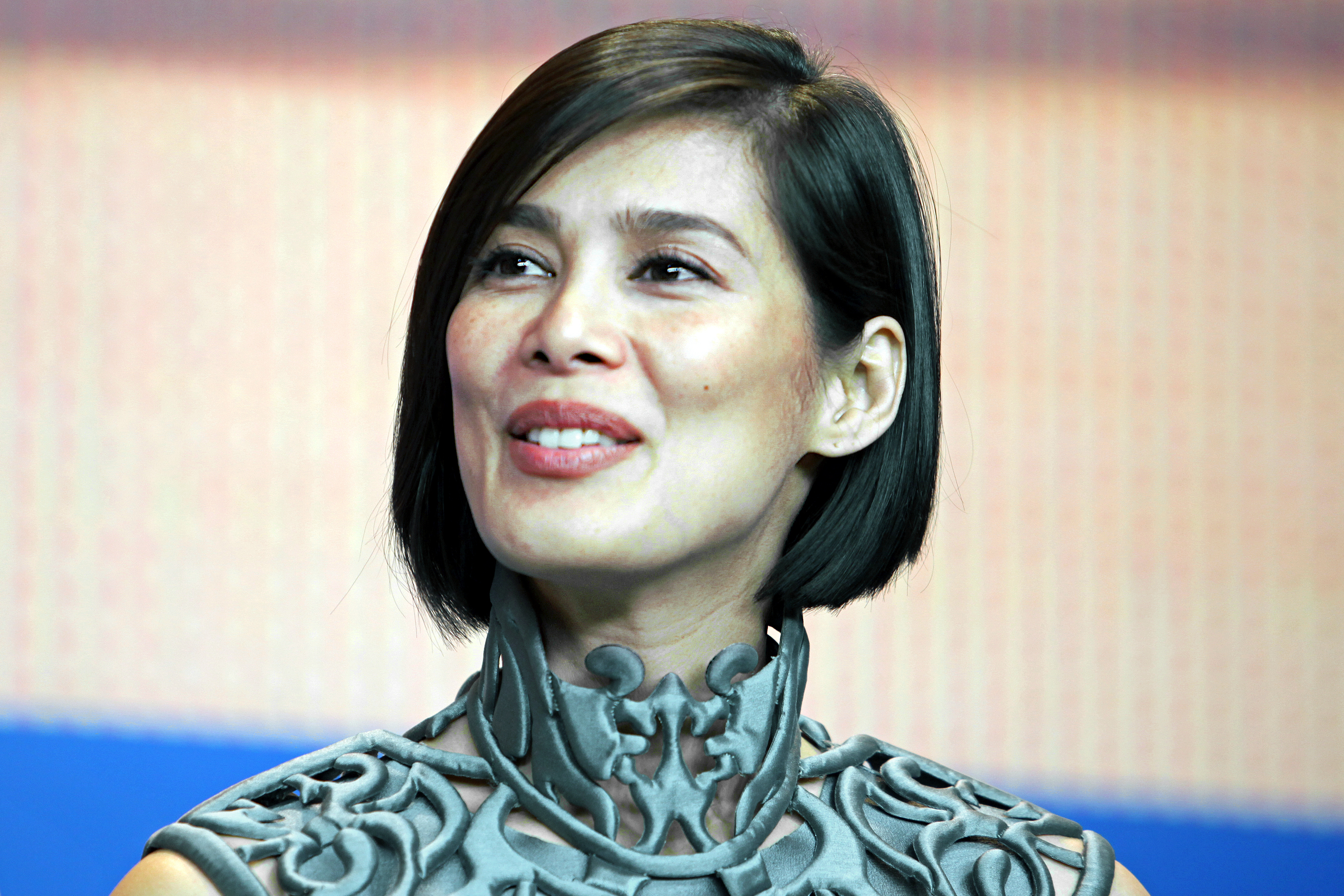
Angel Aquino

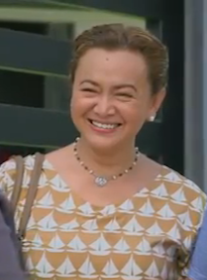
Shamaine Centenera-Buencamino

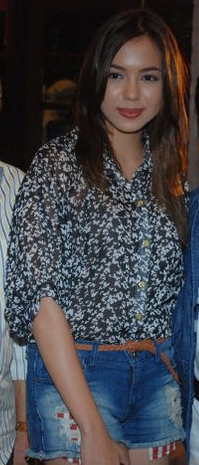
Julia Montes

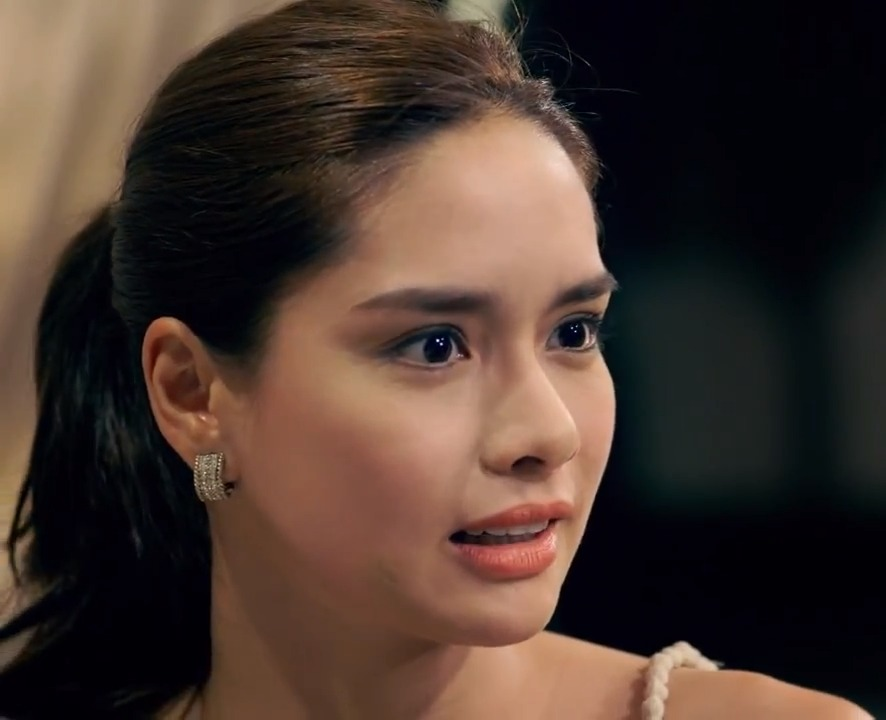
Erich Gonzales

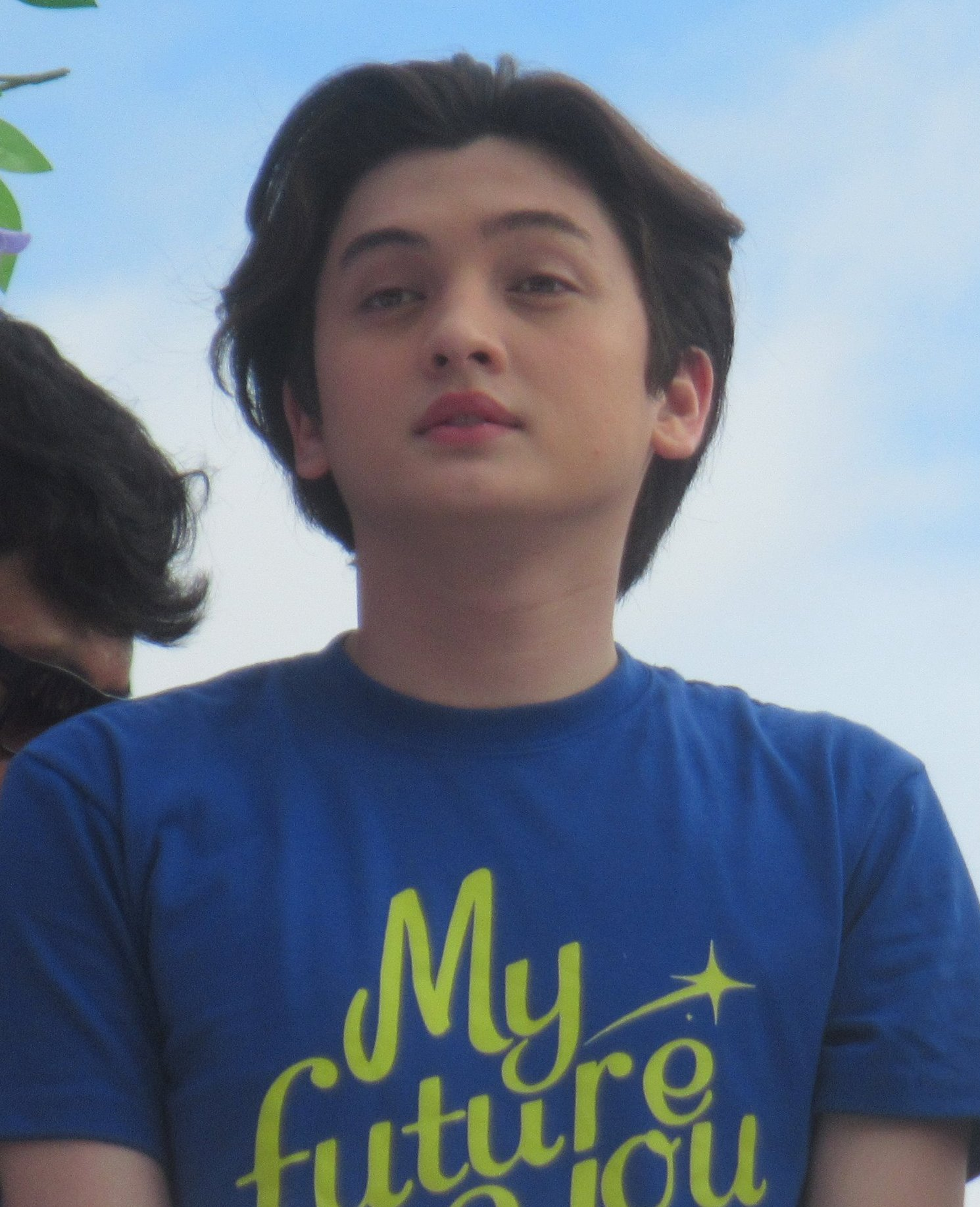
Seth Fedelin

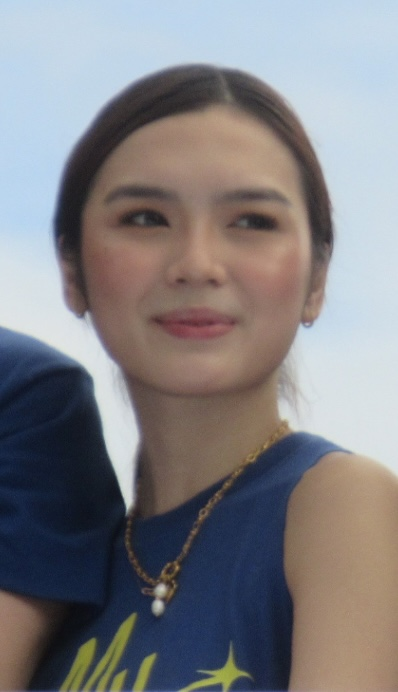
Francine Diaz

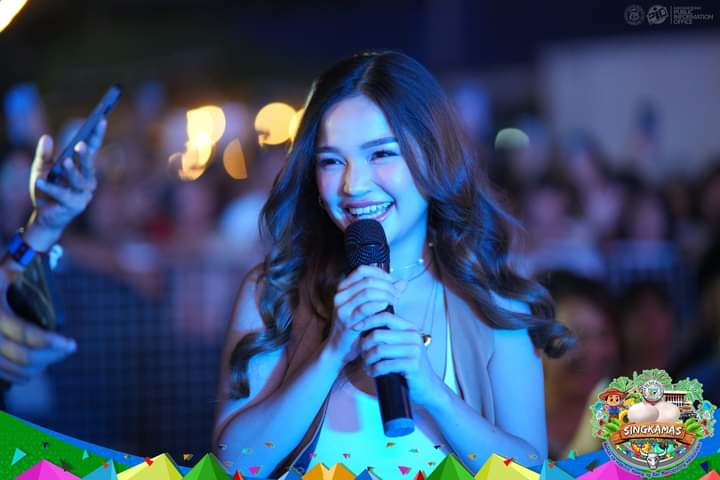
Xyriel Manabat

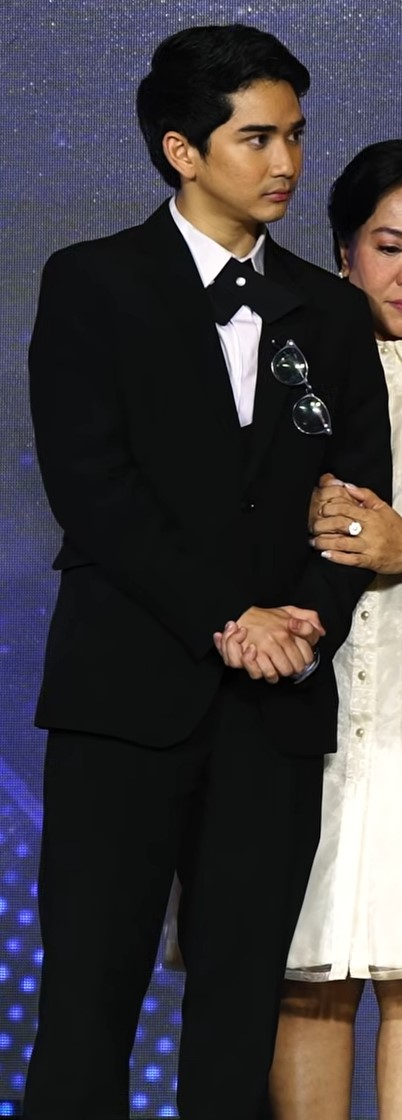
Zaijian Jaranilla

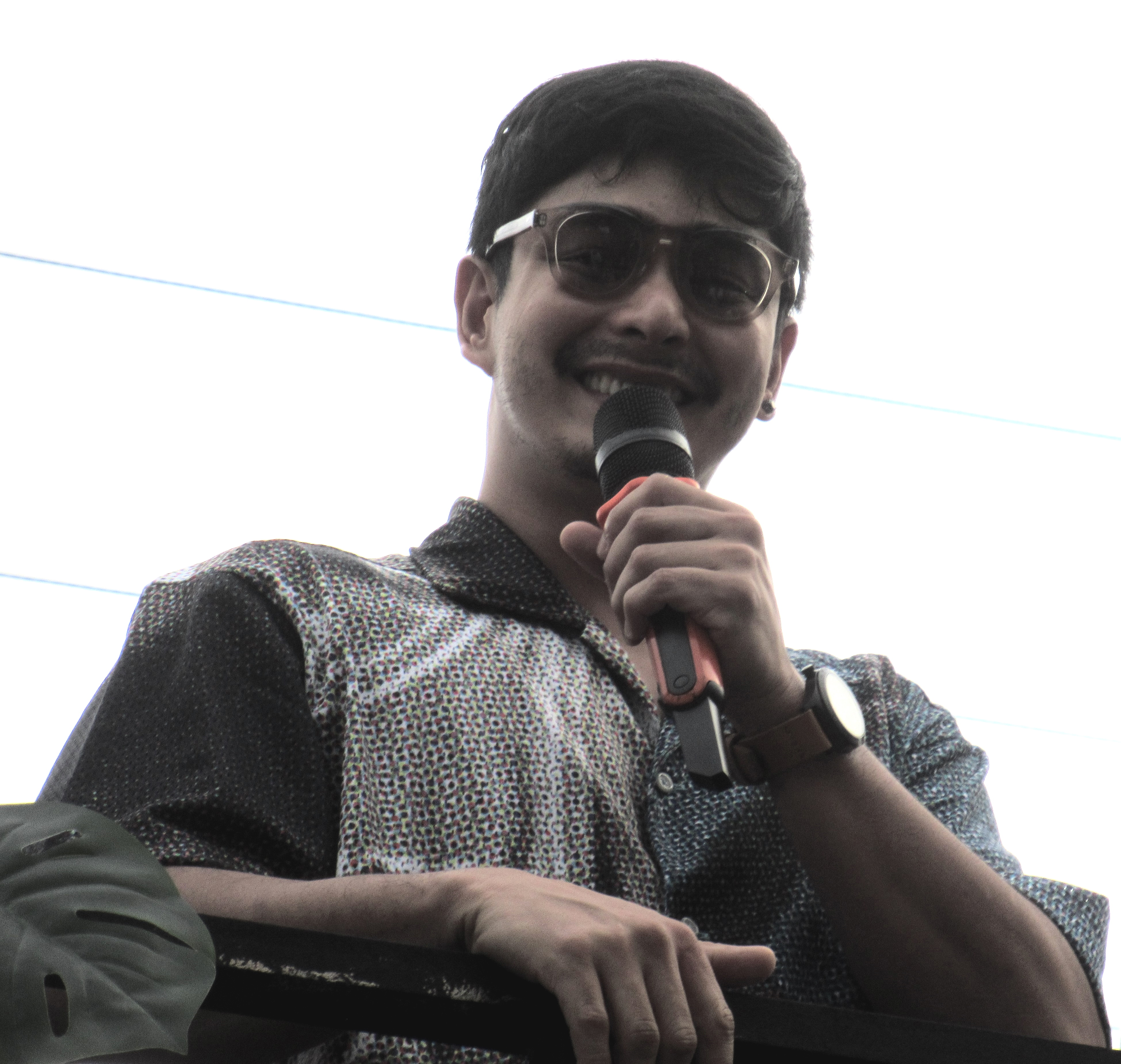
Coco Martin
