= Calla Lily (TV series) =

2006 Philippine television drama series

- Genre: Family drama
- Created by: ABS-CBN Studios; Pablo S. Gomez; Edgar Mortiz
- Directed by: Maryo J. de los Reyes; Lino Cayetano
- Starring: Sharlene San Pedro
- Opening theme: "Calla Lily" by Kyle Balili and Mica Roi Torre
- Country of origin: Philippines
- Original language: Tagalog
- No. of episodes: 75

Production
- Executive producers: Eleanor Rodriguez; Desirey Fernandez-Juan
- Running time: 25–30 minutes

Original release
- Network: ABS-CBN
- Release: May 29 – September 8, 2006

Calla Lily is a 2006 Philippine television drama series broadcast by ABS-CBN. Directed by Maryo J. de los Reyes and Lino Cayetano, it stars Sharlene San Pedro in the title role. It aired on the network's Primetime Bida line up from May 29 to September 8, 2006, replacing Panday and was replaced by Crazy for You.

The series was streaming soon online on Jeepney TV YouTube channel replacing Bituing Walang Ningning.

== Premise ==
It revolves around twin sisters Calla and Lily, hence the title.

== Plot summary ==
Sharlene San Pedro (from Mga Anghel na Walang Langit) starred in this teleserye, which premiered on May 29, 2006 1 year later. She reunited once again with her highly successful Mga Anghel na Walang Langit family composed of directors Maryo J. delos Reyes, Lino Cayetano, writers Agnes Gagilonia-Uligan, Aloy Adlawan and Michiko Yamamoto, as well as versatile actor Johnny Delgado.

In Calla Lily, Sharlene played dual roles, twin sisters Calla and Lily who grow up in a small fishing village in Batangas. Calla and Lily are polar opposites: Calla is outspoken and naughty while Lily is very timid and shy. Both are doted upon by their father, Dodie (Gerald Madrid), who takes care of them while their mother, Sari (Ana Roces), works in Taiwan as an overseas Filipino worker, or an OFW. However, Sari meets Ramil (Yul Servo) a Filipino businessman abroad and has an affair with him. With her conscience eating her up, she returns home to her family, but her secret becomes exposed when Ramil follows her and tries to win her back. To complicate matters, Sari's father Edong (Johnny Delgado) and mother Liza (Evangeline Pascual) prefer Ramil over her husband. Soon Dodie and Sari end up fighting and even their kids take sides. One terrible night, a drunken Dodie takes Edong's boat to sea with Lily following him. The same time a storm hits the village. This period is when the story of Calla Lily unfolded.

Aside from Ana Roces, Gerald Madrid, Evangeline Pascual, Yul Servo and Johnny Delgado, strong performances came from Baron Geisler, Rodjun Cruz, Erich Gonzales, Luz Valdez, Lou Veloso, Lauren Novero, Myla Boyd, Scarlet, Angel Sy, Pewee O'Hara, Hazel Espinosa, and Raquel Montessa. Soliman Cruz, Cloyd Robinson, Niña Manalo, Paolo Ramirez, and Jam Melendez completed the powerhouse cast of Calla Lily.

== Cast and characters ==
=== Main cast ===
- Sharlene San Pedro as Calla / Lily – are twin daughters of a humble carpenter and an OFW in Taiwan. Calla is the mischievous twin while Lily is the more precautious one. They promise to be there for each other no matter what happens.
- Ana Roces as Sari – worked as an employee in a shoe factory in Taiwan to be able to support her family in the Philippines. After an incident between her and her boss Ramil, Sari decided to come home to avoid him. But Ramil would not let her go that easily.
- Gerald Madrid as Dodie – with his wife working abroad, Dodie is left to take care of his kids and help in Sari's family's business. His overbearing father-in-law makes life hard for him because Edong did not want his daughter to get hitched to someone from their small barrio. Dodie fought for their love, but will he be able to accept Sari's infidelity?
- Yul Servo as Ramil – Ramil's obsession with Sari made him follow her back to her hometown. The businessman will stop at nothing to get Sari's love. Even if it means breaking up her marriage with Dodie.
- Johnny Delgado† as Mang Edong – the hot-tempered father of Sari, who earns a living with his small fleet of fishing boats. He would have preferred a son-in-law, who is influential and well-off – someone like Ramil.
- Evangeline Pascual as Aling Lisa – very protective of her children and grandchildren. She also serves as Edong's pacifier but often she also gets caught up in his squabbles with the neighbors.
- Baron Geisler as Jerry – the troublemaker in Sari's family. He often gets into reckless arguments and shady deals. His father is just about ready to disown him. Will he be able to redeem himself in his family's eyes?
- Rodjun Cruz as Jigo – the youngest in Aling Lisa's brood. Jerry refers to him as the favored child for their mother gives him so much attention. Not only that, their father also believes he is the hope of the family for Sari and Jerry have both disappointed him. He falls in love with his best friend, Diday.
- Erich Gonzales as Diday – Although she is the valedictorian of their class, Diday strives hard to be able to continue her college education. Her family's financial situation has her looking for part-time work around town. She was surprised to find Jigo, her best friend treating her more than just his pal.
- Angel Sy as Bing-Bing – called Calla and Lily's triplet because she is their favorite playmate. Whatever the twins do, she does, too.
- Luz Valdez as Aling Mameng – is Aling Lisa's neighbor and confidant. She is also Bing-Bing and Elmer's guardian.
- Paolo Ramirez as Elmer – one of the basketball players in the high school. He also has a crush on Diday.
- Nash Aguas as Terrence – a very sickly kid, Terrence was left at San Isidro by his wealthy parents to improve his health condition. The boy genius becomes a close friend of Bing-Bing and Calla.

=== Minor characters ===
- Raquel Montessa as Aling Ising – hates Edong and his family's guts. Her goal in life is to become rich and flaunt it in front of their neighbors.
- Joy Folloso as Det-Det – Aling Ising's granddaughter. And because of her Lola's attitude towards their neighbors, she also does not like playing with Calla and Lily.
- Soliman Cruz as Mang Pilo – Aling Ising's husband and Edong's competitor in the fishing business. Edong suspects him as the one who is responsible in sabotaging his fishing boats.
- Ronnie Lazaro as Apo Abdon – the famed albularyo of the barrio, Apo Abdon heals his patients by sipping the aching part of the body. A vicious rumor ruins his reputation and now all he wants is revenge.
- Lou Veloso as Father Theo – the conscience of the townspeople. The parish priest often gives out advice to the most troubled citizens of San Isidro. He too most of the time catches Calla doing pranks.
- Janna Trias as Miriam – Sari's best friend in their town. She also worked in Taiwan and she swore to keep Sari and Ramil's affair a secret.
- Scarlet Geulen as Ursula – spreading rumors is what Ursula does best. But her instincts were right when she spotted something brewing with Ramil and Sari from a mile away.
- Hazel Espinosa as Doc Lizzy – could not resist Jerry's charm despite her being married to Tony, a hard working OFW. She was forced to shut down the clinic when her husband caught her in a passionate kiss with Jerry.
- Jam Melendez as Diego – one of Mang Edong's fishermen. He resorted to dynamite fishing to augment his catch and be able to increase his meager income. He wants to be debt free from Mang Edong.
- Hubs Azarcon as Itoy – one of Edong's fishermen, who has become close friends with Dodie. He encourages him to work and become a better man for his children.
- Eric Fructuoso as Norman – Bing Bing's real father. His existence was kept from Aling Mameng because he got her daughter Melody pregnant while still in college. He wants to be a part of Bing Bing's life because his wife, Olga, could not conceive after their first child died.
- Vanna Garcia as Melody – Mameng's oldest daughter. She told her mom that Bing Bing was a street kid she helped out and took home when she was actually her own child. She feared that Mameng would disown her for she was still finishing her studies.

=== Other characters ===
- Eliza Pineda as Lilly
- Melard C. Calimlim as Melard
- Carl John Barrameda as Ampong
- Charlie Davao as Leo Martin
- Dinky Doo as Mang Walter
- Miles Ocampo as Laning
- Jesus Doldelea as Boyoyoy
- Robert Villar as Berto
- Lauren Novero as Abel
- Blumark Roces as Colby
- Kitkat as Jane
- Ervin Bobadilla as Best friend
- Rommel Chika as Michelle
- Frances Ignacio as Marianne
- Minda Flores as Minda
- Jodi Sta. Maria as Maureen
- Igi Boy Flores as Dennis
