= Sharlene San Pedro =

Filipino actress and vlogger (born 1999)

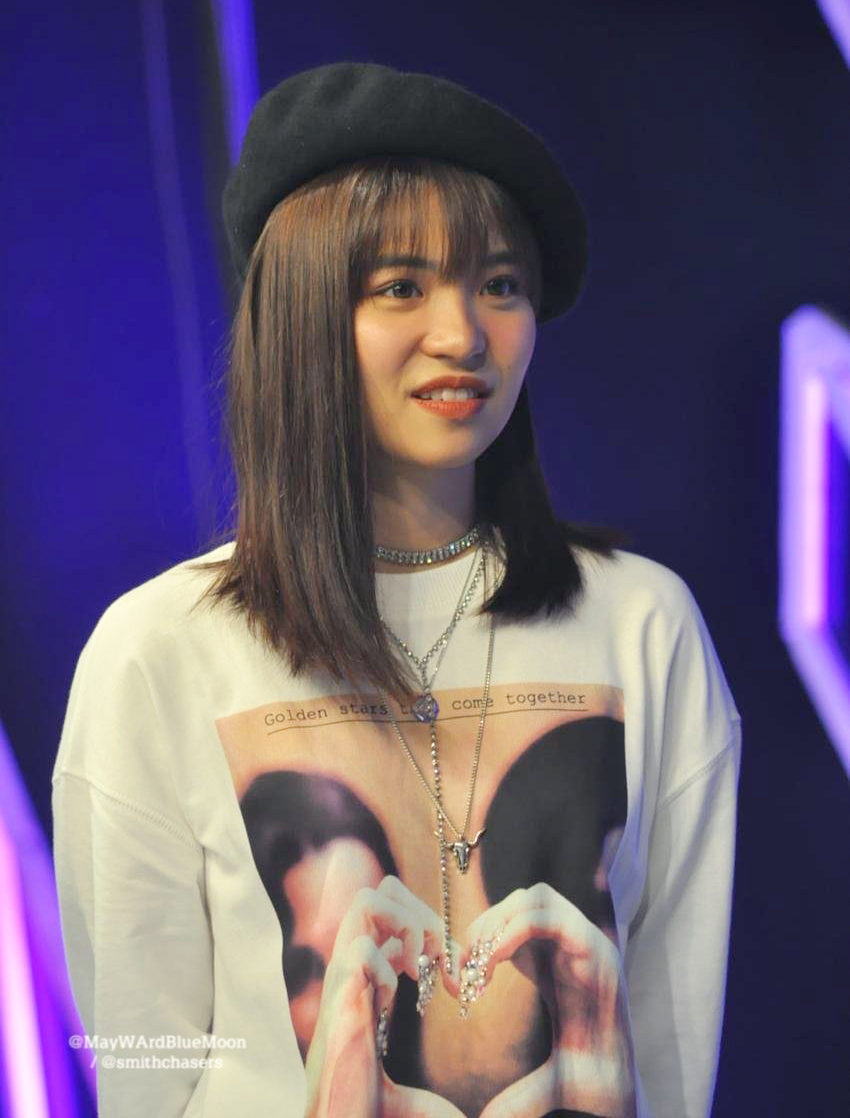
- San Pedro in 2019
- Born: Sharlene Santos San Pedro; April 5, 1999 (age 27); Pulilan, Bulacan, Philippines
- Education: AMA Online Education
- Occupations: Actress; singer; VJ; TV host; vlogger; streamer
- Years active: 2004–present
- Agent: Star Magic (2004–present)
- Musical career
- Genre: OPM
- Years active: 2016–present
- Label: Yellow Room Music
- Website: Sharlene San Pedro on Facebook

Sharlene Santos San Pedro (Tagalog: [ʃaɾˈlin sɐn ˈpɛdɾɔ]; born April 5, 1999) is a Filipino actress, singer, and media personality.

She made her first television appearance at the age of four when she joined ABS-CBN's talent search Star Circle Quest: Kids Edition in 2004, and came in at second place. She is known for portraying the roles of Gigi, Calla & Lily, and Shirley in the series Mga Anghel na Walang Langit, Calla Lily, and Luv U respectively. She also played the title role in Princess Sarah in 2007.

San Pedro received her first acting award as the "Most Popular Child Actress" by the Guillermo Mendoza Memorial Scholarship Foundation in 2009. In 2012, San Pedro was nominated in the 17th Asian Television Awards as Best Actress in a Lead-Drama Role for her portrayal as a teenage mother in the Maalaala Mo Kaya episode, "T-Shirt".

== Early life ==
Sharlene Santos San Pedro was born on April 5, 1999, in Pulilan, Bulacan to parents Hector, a business man, and Myleen. She has two brothers named Jeremy and Clark: the former being the oldest of the three, while the latter is the youngest. She attended Dear Jesus Montessori School during kindergarten and College of Our Lady of Mercy of Pulilan during high school.

== Career ==
=== 2004–2006: Star Circle Quest and Goin' Bulilit ===
In 2004, San Pedro joined the reality-based talent competition Star Circle Quest on ABS-CBN. Together with the other contestants, San Pedro had undergone talent training, physical enhancement and different challenges to test their talent skills.

She managed to be in the "Magic Circle of 5" with fellow competitors Nash Aguas, Aaron Junatas, Mikylla Ramirez, and CJ Navato. During the 'Grand Questors Night' held on June 5, 2004, in Araneta Coliseum, she won first runner-up. Soon after, she became a part of Star Magic with an exclusive contract with ABS-CBN. Her acting career began in the same year, portraying the young Faith/Tala in Krystala.

In February 2005, San Pedro was cast in the then newly launched sketch comedy gag show, Goin' Bulilit, featuring children in various comedic situations. She was in the main cast until 2011 when she graduated. The 'Seventh Batch Graduates', including San Pedro, left due to the fact that the show is for kids, while they were already growing older.

Aside from being one of the original mainstays in Goin Bulilit, San Pedro also starred in OK Fine Whatever sitcom, again, with Aguas. In addition, she was one of the main cast in Mga Anghel na Walang Langit, portraying as Gigi. Her performance involved heavy drama acting since the series depicts the lives of exploited and unfortunate children. She was next cast to play two different characters on ABS-CBN's television series Calla Lily. The story was about Calla and Lily (both played by San Pedro) who have different personalities: one is outspoken while the other is shy.

=== 2007–2011: Film projects and recognition ===
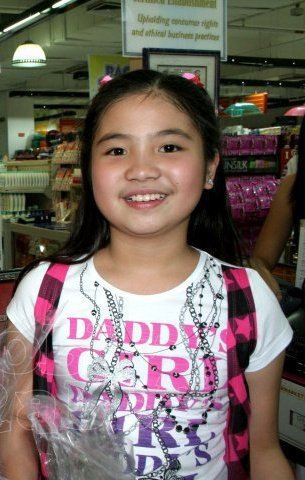
San Pedro during her younger years.

In 2007, San Pedro became the main lead once again in ABS-CBN's Princess Sarah after Calla Lily. The next year, Sharlene was chosen to portray the role of Young Selene in Rounin, a fantasy and martial arts series shot using high-definition video technology, a first in the Philippine series. The series marked San Pedro and Jairus Aquino's first team-up; they were once again paired up later on as on-screen teenage sweethearts in Luv U in 2013.

In October 2008, she was cast on her first film, Mag-ingat Ka Sa... Kulam, with Judy Ann Santos. Her performance earned her a nomination for the Movie Child Performer of the Year at the 25th PMPC Star Awards for Movies. She also appeared as a guest star in the series Kung Fu Kids, playing the role of Reyna Ungga-Ungga, the person who eventually helped the seven Kung Fu kids in their battles. The next year, San Pedro joined the cast of Kamoteng Kahoy, an indie film by Maryo J. de los Reyes. She was also cast with Jairus Aquino in ABS-CBN's Pieta as Kakai Angeles.

San Pedro received her first acting award as the Most Popular Child Actress by the Guillermo Mendoza Memorial Scholarship Foundation. In addition, she was nominated the Best Comedy Actress by the PMPC Star Awards for TV for two consecutive years since 2008 for her character roles in Goin' Bulilit. Her portrayal of young Mabel in the horror suspense film Segunda Mano marked her fourth film and her first official entry to the 2011 Metro Manila Film Festival. The following year, she played Nene in Corazon: Ang Unang Aswang.

Following the start of her teenage years came the end of her spot in Goin' Bulilit. After six years, she left the show in 2011.

=== 2012–2017: Teenage years, international recognition and Luv U ===
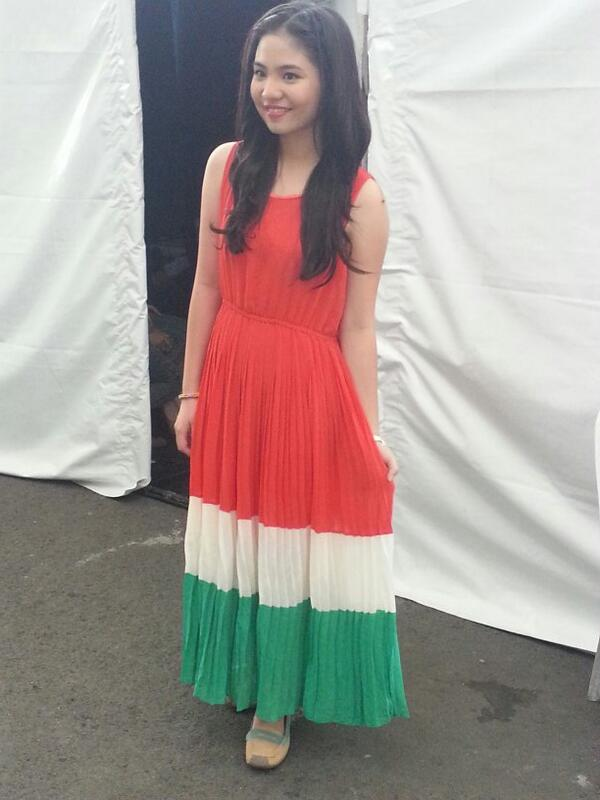
Sharlene San Pedro during her teen years.

During her career gap, she frequently stars in Maalaala Mo Kaya series, which features weekly real-life stories or anecdotes of common people or even famous celebrities and personalities through letter-sending.

In 2012, she starred in Larong Bata, a film promoted and supported by the Department on Education for it showed the effects of bullying among kids. The film received positive reviews and was frequently shown in the different schools in the Philippines. In the same year, she was nominated in the 17th Asian Television Awards as Best Actress in a Lead-Drama Role for her portrayal as a teenage mother in the Maalaala Mo Kaya episode, "T-Shirt". The next year, she starred as Lavinia in Star Cinema's Must Be Love released on March 13. She later joined the second-season cast of Luv U.

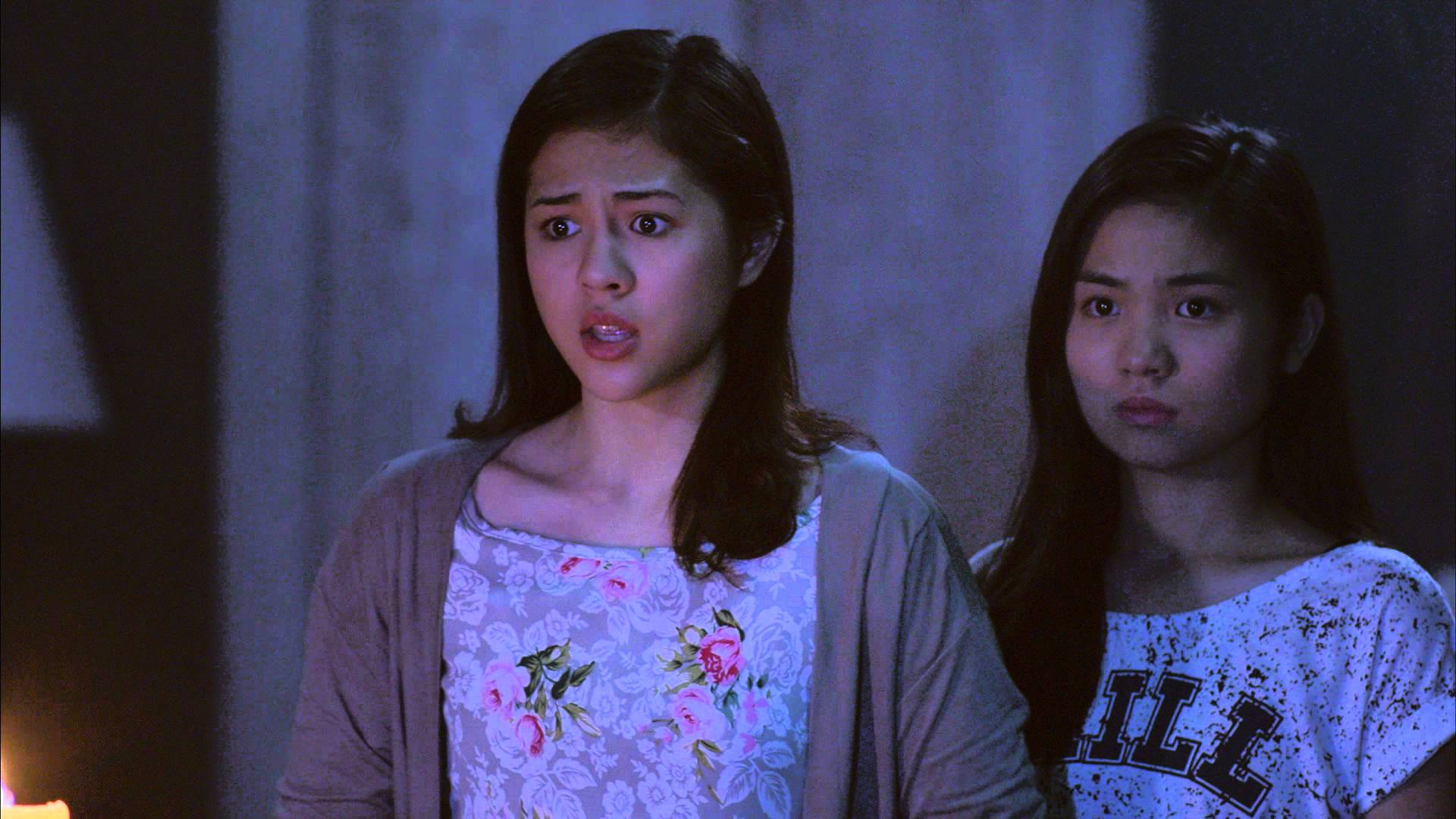
San Pedro (right) portrays as Faye alongside Janella Salvador in the 2015 horror film Haunted Mansion.

In 2014, she starred in Wansapanatym's month-long special "Si Lulu at Si Liit" with Jairus Aquino and Francis Magundayao. The story and their team-up received favorable reviews and consecutive high ratings. She started appearing in the Primetime series again soon after, now as a teenager. She received guest roles in FlordeLiza and FPJ's Ang Probinsyano, wherein she was reunited with Nash Aguas in the latter. She also starred as one of the supporting cast in Nathaniel in 2015. By the end of the year, she was cast in the 2015 Metro Manila Film Festival film entry Haunted Mansion as Faye. Her acting was praised as she "...displays acting chops honed from years in the business. She does not resort to hysterics, but doles out an even and even mature performance as Ella's best friend.

Together with Jairus Aquino, San Pedro was announced to be one of the new video jockeys in the music channel Myx in the beginning of the year 2016. According to the announcement, ever since "[t]hey... won as the Myx Celebrity VJ Duo in the show's weekly online poll [in February 2015], their followers have shown interest in seeing them again on the music channel". Both were also cast in Wansapanatym's "Susi Ni Sisay" by Wenn V. Deramas. This was Deramas' last TV project before he died. Still paired with Aquino, San Pedro was supposed to appear in Written in Our Stars as a supporting cast but the show was postponed due to lead star Toni Gonzaga's pregnancy announcement. During this time, they were cast in the noon-time drama series Langit Lupa.

Also in 2016, San Pedro pursued her singing career when she launched her first single "Paraan". The song is a cover of Filipino band Mayonnaise's track from their album Tayo na Lang Dalawa released in 2014. The band members, significantly its singer, Monty Macalino, worked closely with her and supported her to pursue her singing career. An accompanying music video was also released under Yellow Room and directed by Chuck Ronquillo. Her cover single received the Favorite Remake award at the 12th Myx Music Awards held the next year. In 2017, she released another cover single "Stars & Caramel Bars", originally performed by Filipino indie band Sourberry. The music video accompaniment features Arturo Daza, her co-VJ in Myx.

=== 2018–present: Singing career and Class of 2018 ===
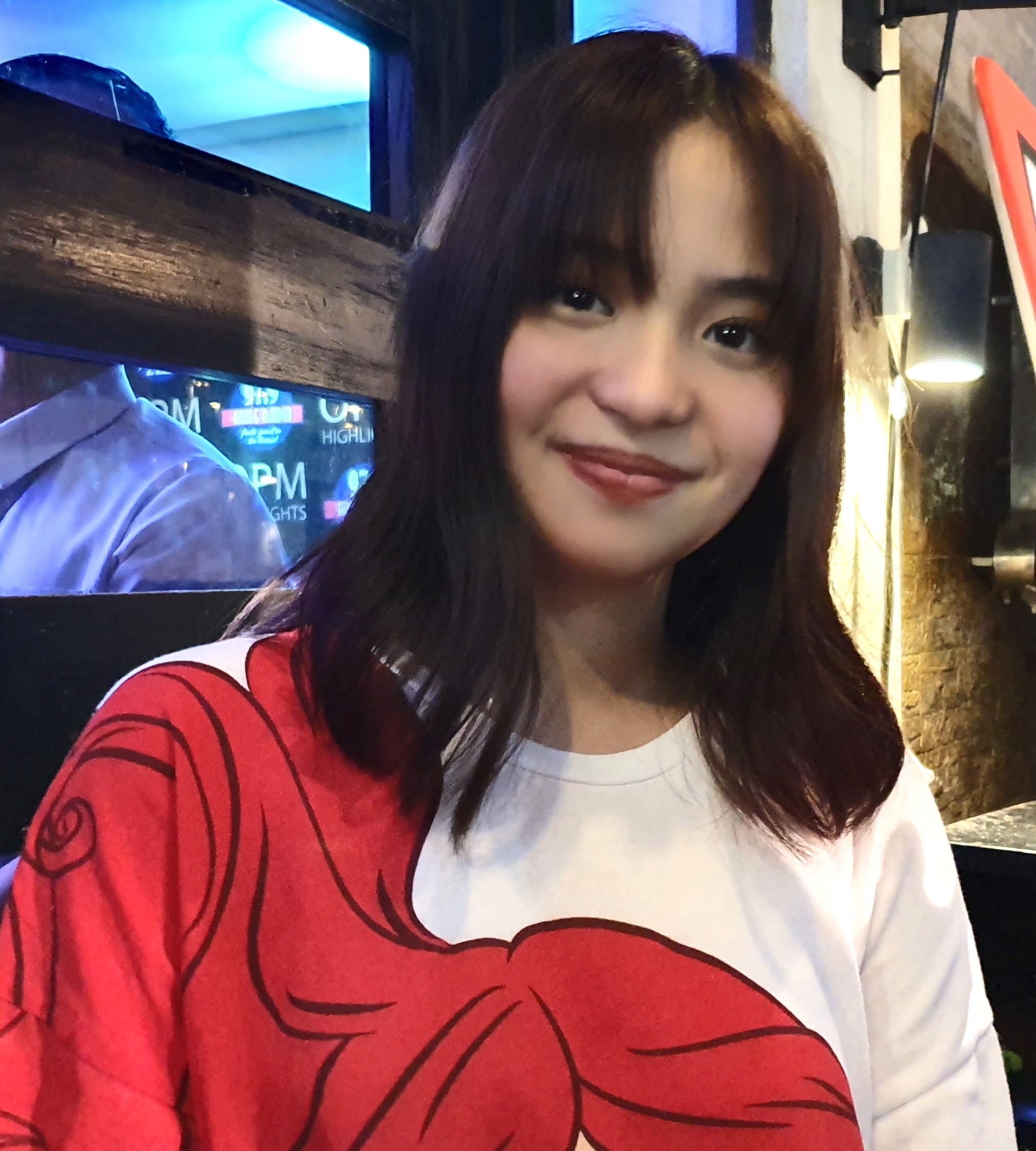
San Pedro in The Music Hall for the 97.9 Home Radio Anniversary, 2019

After releasing two cover singles in 2016 and 2017, respectively, San Pedro continued to pursue her music career. In June 2018, she signed a contract with Ivory Music and Video. She then released two original singles entitled "Pa'no Ang Lahat" and "Everything Will Be Alright" accompanied by music videos. In June 2019, she performed as a special guest during Mayonnaise's first major concert Akalain Mo 'Yun at the Music Museum. In September, she was once again invited to perform on the band's sophomore concert, Akalain Mo 'Yun Part 2, three months after the success of the first one.

In May 2018, San Pedro was cast in TRex Entertainment's teen suspense–thriller film Class of 2018 alongside Nash Aguas, Kristel Fulgar, and CJ Navato. The four of them were former part of Goin' Bulilit cast. This marks as her first lead role in a film and her first time in years to act again. Her drama episode in Maalaala Mo Kaya (for which she received the "Best Single Performance by an Actress" nomination at the 32nd PMPC Star Awards for Television) was her most recent work. Her performance as Ada in the film received satisfactory reviews: the critics agreed that she has a screen presence especially since she achieved in performing her role, whether during fight-scenes, heart-fluttering scenes or drama scenes.

In May 2019, San Pedro and Aguas have partnered once again in iWant's digital film The Gift directed by Onat Diaz. It was filmed way back in 2016. San Pedro plays the role of Tina, a sheltered woman who has a congenital heart problem. Due to its digital platform release, "the film received positive feedback online for its lead stars' performances and relatable story, and for promoting awareness on the developmental disorder".

After leaving Myx as a VJ, San Pedro started hosting television and online shows in 2019.

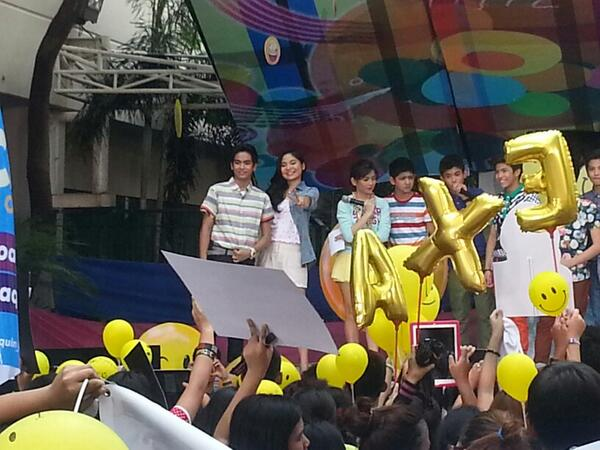
Sharlene San Pedro (and Jairus Aquino) happily greets their fans during "ASAP Fans Day" on May 18, 2014.

== Personal life and education ==
Outside of acting, she also sings, plays the guitar, and collects watches.

She finished high school at the Sanctuary Christian School in 2015. In 2022 she graduated from AMA University with a degree in AB Psychology.

== Public image ==
Star Cinema recognized San Pedro as the most promising female star in 2014 after she won the votes from the fans. The production company lists that she is a "versatile teen actress", "hard worker", "talented", "the next big thing", and "being an inspiration to people".

== Hosting ==
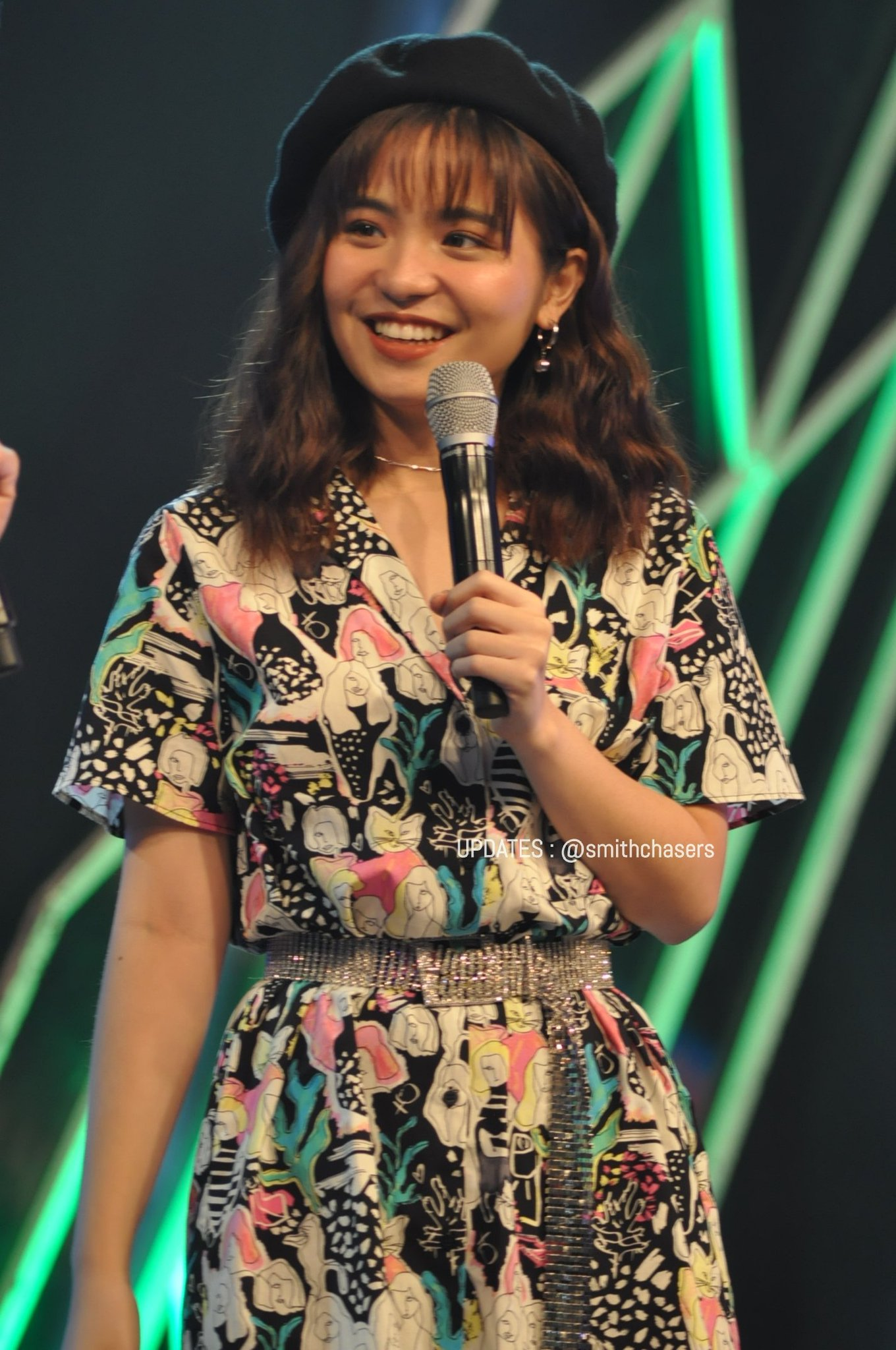
Sharlene San Pedro as a guest host in iWant ASAP on November 3, 2019.

San Pedro made her hosting debut with the music channel Myx in 2016, although she first started as a guest video jockey in February 2015. Her guest appearance allowed her to receive the "Favorite Myx Celebrity VJ" nomination at the 11th Myx Music Awards. After her successful stint as a Myx Celebrity VJ, she was given a regular spot in the music channel in the beginning of the year 2016. Her role as a Myx VJ included introducing music videos, hosting segments, and interviewing singers. She was a Myx VJ for three years.

In 2019, she started to appear on the online counterpart of the variety show ASAP, known as iWant ASAP, both as a guest and a guest/co-host. According to iWant ASAP, she was the Most Requested Artist in the show. She also joined the other hosts in the award-winning variety show S.M.A.C. Pinoy Ito Season 3 and the new online show Your Moment Apartment (the online counterpart of the reality talent competition show Your Moment) in IBC 13 and ABS-CBN, respectively.

She was also invited to host events, regional shows, and others.

List of shows hosted
Year	Show	Role
2016	Estudyantipid	host
2015–2016	Myx Studio Sessions	Video jockey/host
2015–2019	Myx Daily Top 10: International Edition	Video jockey/host
2015–2019	My Myx	Video jockey/host
2015–2019	Pinoy Myx	Video jockey/host
2015–2019	Pop Myx	Video jockey/host
2016–2019	Mellow Myx	Video jockey/host
2016–2019	Myx International Top 20	Video jockey/host
2019	iWant ASAP	recurring host
2019	S.M.A.C. Pinoy Ito Season 3	host
2019	Your Moment	online host

== Filmography ==
=== Film ===
Year	Title	Character/Role	Notes
2008	Mag-ingat Ka Sa... Kulam	Sophie	Won Most Popular Child Actress
2008	One True Love	Sandra	
2009	Kamoteng Kahoy	Rosemary	Indie film
2011	Segunda Mano	Young Mabel	2011 Metro Manila Film Festival official entry
2012	Larong Bata	'charming girl'	Indie film endorsed by the Department of Education
2012	Corazon: Ang Unang Aswang	Nene	
2013	Must Be Love	Lavinia	
2015	Haunted Mansion	Faye	2015 Metro Manila Film Festival official entry
2016	Resbak	Leila	Indie film
2017	Tatlong Bibe	Liberty	Indie film
2018	Class of 2018	Ada Marie Umali	First lead role
2018	Mary, Marry Me	young Mary Jane	2018 Metro Manila Film Festival official entry
2019	The Gift	Tina	Digital streaming
2021	Happy Times	Toni Santos	
2023	Ten Little Mistresses	Moon Young	prime video
2023	Becky & Badette	Herself	

=== Television ===
Year	Title	Character/Role	Notes
2004	Wansapanataym	Ginny	
2004	Krystala	young Faith/Tala	
2005	Goin' Bulilit	herself	2005–2011; 2015; Nominated twice for Best Comedy Actress in the PMPC Star Awards for TV
2005	OK Fine Whatever	Sharlene	
2005	Mga Anghel Na Walang Langit	Gigi	first lead role
2006	MMK: "Shades"	Baby	Season 14; Episode 408
2006	Calla Lily	Calla and Lily	first twin role
2006	Komiks Presents: "Sandok Ni Boninay"	Boninay	Season 1; Episode 10
2007	Princess Sarah	Sarah Crewe	
2007	Rounin	young Selene	
2007	Ysabella	young Alex Mendoza	
2007	Margarita	Gelly Trinidad	
2007	Love Spell Presents: "Hairy Harry"	Celine	Season 5; Episode 2
2007	Pedro Penduko at ang mga Engkantao	Monique	
2008	Lobo	young Lyka Raymundo / Ulay	
2008	Kung Fu Kids	Reyna Ungga-Ungga	
2008	MMK: "Ice Cream"	young Charice Pempengco	Season 17; Episode 176
2008	Komiks Presents: Tiny Tony	Celine	
2008	Pieta	Kakai	
2008	MMK: "Lason"	Lilet	Season 17; Episode 245
2009	Bud Brothers Series	Young Julia	
2009	MMK: "Wheel Chair"	young Bernadette	Season 17; Episode 508
2009	MMK: "Sulô" (Torch)	Carmin	Season 18; Episode 11
2009	Tayong Dalawa	young Ingrid Martinez	
2010	Momay	Lindsay	
2010	MMK: "Kwintas" (Necklace)	young Myla	Season 18; Episode 33
2010	Goin' Bulilit Presents: Prom the Bottom of my Heart		5th anniversary special
2010	MMK: "Mangga"	young Marie	Season 19; Episode 7
2010	Kung Tayo'y Magkakalayo	young Selina	
2011	Wansapanatym: "Sabay-Sabay Pasaway"	Hannah Ferrer	Season 2; Episode 44
2011	MMK: "Wig"	young Gretchen	Season 19; Episode 33
2011	Goin' Bulilit Presents: Dance Upon A Time	Bea	
2011	Your Song Presents: "Someone Like You"	Kim Fatima Martin	
2011	MMK: "Sulat"	Edlyn	Season 19; Episode 47
2011	My Binondo Girl	young Amethyst Sy	
2012	MMK: "Belo"	young Jane	Season 20; Episode 12
2012	MMK: "T-shirt"	Gigi	Season 20; Episode 19; Nominated for Best Actress in a Leading Role in the Asian Television Awards
2012	MMK: "Cellphone"	young Lyn	Season 20; Episode 46
2013	Luv U	Shirley Bernardo	2nd season; 2013–2016
2013	MMK: "Kulungan"	Chacha	Season 21; Episode 131
2014	MMK: "Harmonica"	Neth/Nenita	Season 22; Episode 157
2014	Wansapanatym: "Si Lulu at si Lili Liit"	Lulu/Lili	second twin role; Season 5; Episodes 177–183
2014	MMK: "Lipstick"	Young Susan	Season 22; Episode 172
2015	Nathaniel	Hannah Bartolome / Mary V. Laxamana	
2015	FPJ's Ang Probinsyano	Teen Glen Corpuz	
2016	Wansapanataym: Susi Ni Sisay	Sisay	Season 7; Episodes 283–292
2016	Langit Lupa	Corazon "Heart" Cayabyab	
2017	MMK: "Candy"	Princess	Season 25; Episode 17
2017	MMK: "Jumper"	Charice Pempengco	Season 25; Episode 33
2017	Ipaglaban Mo: "Kulam"	Ria	Episode 174
2018	MMK: “Rubber Shoes”	Mary Joy Tabal	Season 26; Episode 8; Nominated for Best Single Performance by an Actress at the PMPC Star Awards
2019	Goin' Bulilit	herself	Recurring cast
2019	MMK: "Bracelet"	Charlotte Jill "Alot"	
2020	Unconditional	Agnes Martinez	Digital streaming

=== Digital shorts ===
- 2017: Myx Halloween Special: "Kwintas"
- 2018: Coffee Break – "Decaf"
- 2018: "Gusto Ko Lang Kasama Ka Palagi" by Mayonnaise

=== Reality/Variety shows ===
Year	Title	Notes
2004	Star Circle Quest	as a contestant
2005	Homeboy	recurring guest
2005–present	ASAP	recurring guest
2009; 2011	It's Showtime: Kids Edition	as a special judge
2011	I Dare You	
2013; 2019	Minute to Win It	recurring guest
2014	Gandang Gabi Vice	
2016	Magandang Buhay	recurring guest
2016	Financial Literacy	guest
2016	Family Feud	
2018–2020	Matanglawin	recurring guest
2018–2019	Banana Sundae	recurring guest
2019–2020	iWant ASAP	recurring guest/host
2019	G Diaries	
2020	Dormitory Academy Season 2 (online)	professor
2020	Ambagets: Ambag ng Bagets (online)	host
2022	Vita Cuties	released on YouTube; 9 episodes

== Discography ==
=== Singles ===
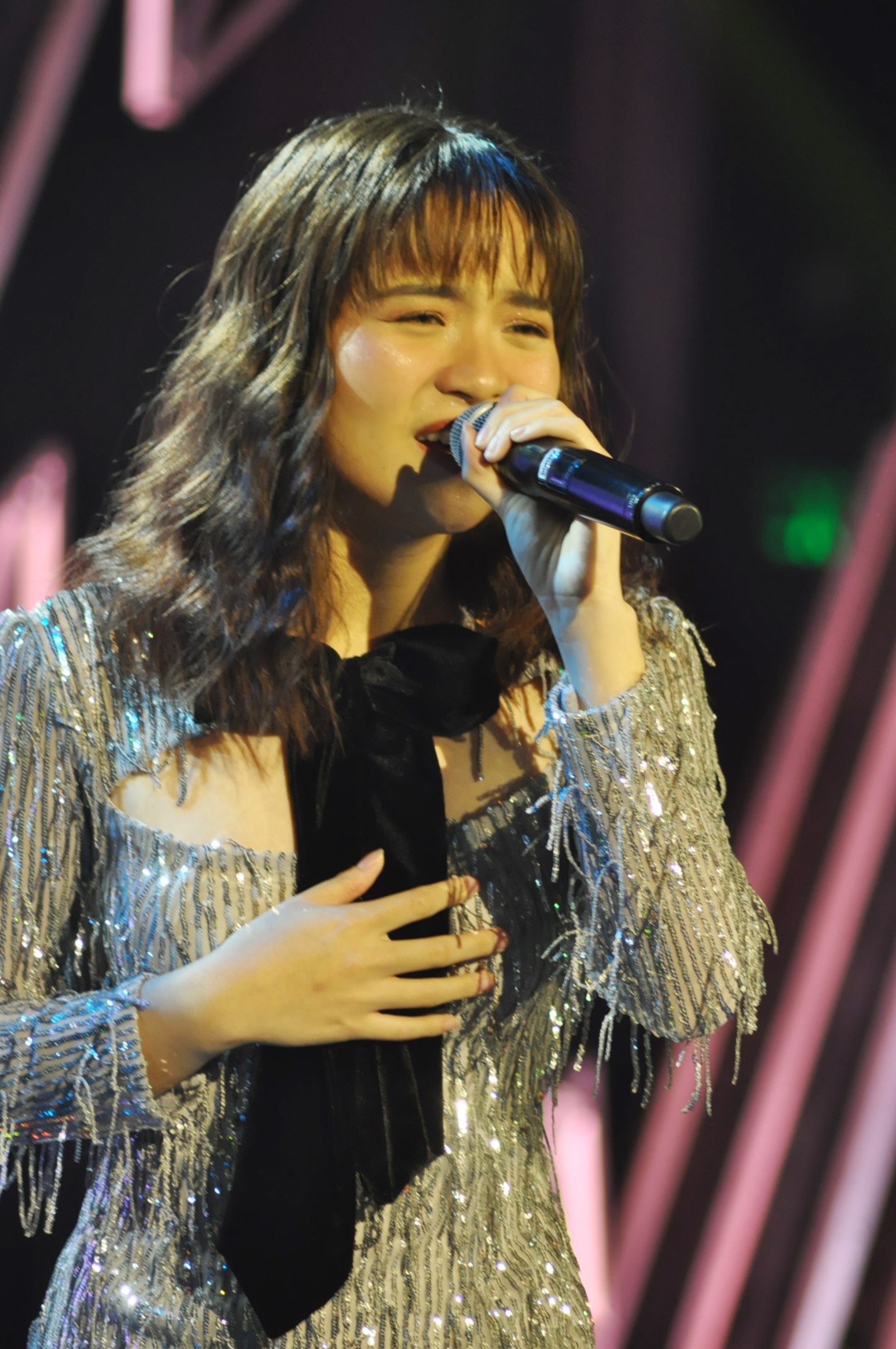
Sharlene San Pedro performing to an audience in November 2019.

As lead artist
Year	Title	Peak chart positions			Album
Year	Title	Philippines			Album
Year	Title	Myx Hit Chart	Pinoy Myx Countdown	Myx Daily Top 10	Album
2016	"Paraan"	3	2	1	Non-album single
2017	"Stars and Caramel Bars"	7	3	2	Non-album single
2018	"Pa'no ang Lahat"	5	4	4	Non-album single
2019	"Everything Will Be Alright"	8	2	4	Non-album single
2019	"Pusong Naliligaw" (ft. Zack Tabudlo)	10	6	10	Non-album single
2020	"Paraan" (Live) (with Mayonnaise)	—	—	—	Wish Live (online streaming)
2020	"Let Me"	—	—	—	Non-album single
2022	"Running"	—	—	—	Non-album single
2023	"We Are In the Zone" (with Myrtle Sarrosa, Zie Barcelo, and Patricia Reyes)	—	—	—	Non-album single
"—" denotes releases that did not chart or were not recorded.

As featured artist
Year	Artist	Title	Album
2016	Mayonnaise	"Silid"	Pano Nangyari Yun
2017	ABS-CBN artists	"Ikaw Ang Sunshine Ko, Isang Pamilya Tayo"	

== Videography ==
=== Video albums ===
Year	Title	Album details	Track listing
2004	My First Lessons with Jollibee	Labels: Star Records Video in cooperation of Dept. of Education, Bureau of Elementary Education; Format: Audio CD; Singers: John Manalo, Nash Aguas, Sharlene San Pedro, Nikki Bagaporo	Track listing: Alpabetong Filipino; Mga Hugis at Kulay; Bilang
2006	My First Lessons with Jollibee (Series II)	Labels: Star Records Video in cooperation of Dept. of Education, Bureau of Elementary Education; Format: Audio CD; Singers: John Manalo, Nash Aguas, Sharlene San Pedro, Nikki Bagaporo	Track listing: My Self; My Community; My Family
2008	Jump Around: Kids Dance Album	Labels: Star Records; Format: Audio CD; Singers: Makisig Morales, Nash Aguas, Sharlene San Pedro, Jairus Aquino, Basty Alcanses, Aaron Junatas	Track listing: "Jump Around"; "Let's Dance and Shake it"; "Moose Dance"; "Rain Rain Go Away"; "Kokobom"; bonus: "Jump Around" Minus 1

==== Other releases ====
Year	Title	Album details
2007	The Best of Goin' Bulilit	Released: December 27, 2007 (PHP); Labels: Star Home Video; Format: DVD

=== Music videos ===
As a singer
Year	Song	Details	Length
2016	"Paraan"	Director: Chuck Ronquillo	4:37
2017	"Stars and Caramel Bars"	Director: Johnny Delos Santos and John Manalo	3:51
2019	"Pa'no Ang Lahat"	Director:	5:06
2019	"Everything Will Be Alright"		4:08
2019	"Pusong Naliligaw" (ft. Zack Tabudlo)	Director: John Manalo	4:17

As a guest
Year	Song	Details	Length
2007	"Gusto Na Kita"	Director: Singer(s): 6cyclemind; Album: Fiesta! Magsasaya Ang Lahat	3:59
2016	"Ferris Wheel"	Director: Benedict Mariategue; Singer(s): Yeng Constantino; Album: All About Love	4:28
2019	"Gusto Ko Lang"	Director: Yellow Room Studio; Singer(s): Mayonnaise; Album: Gusto Ko Lang Kasama Ka Palagi Pero Hindi Pwede	3:14
2022	"Kabado"	Director: Kris Cazin; Singer(s): Adie; Album: Senaryo	6:08
2026	"pelikula"	Director: Stephanie Cea; Singer(s): VXON; Album: n/a	3:57

== Awards and nominations ==
Award ceremony	Year	Category	Nominated work	Result	Ref.
ASAP Pop Viewers' Choice Awards	2014	Pop Teen Popsies	herself with Jairus Aquino	Won	
ASAP Pop Viewers' Choice Awards	2016	Pop Love Team	herself with Jairus Aquino	Nominated	
ASAP Pop Viewers' Choice Awards	2017	Pop Love Teens	herself with Jairus Aquino	Nominated	
Asian Television Awards	2012	Best Actress in a Leading Role	Maalaala Mo Kaya: T-shirt episode	Nominated	
Big Bold Brave Awards	2023	Favorite Game Streamer	herself	Won	
GMMSF Entertainment Awards	2009	Most Popular Child Actress	Mag-ingat Ka Sa... Kulam	Won	
Gawad Genio Awards	2009	Best Film Child Performer	Mag-ingat Ka Sa... Kulam	Nominated	
Myx Music Awards	2016	Favorite Myx Celebrity VJ	herself with Jairus Aquino	Won	
Myx Music Awards	2017	Favorite Guest Appearance in a Music Video	Ferris Wheel	Nominated	
Myx Music Awards	2017	Favorite Remake	Paraan	Won	
IRL Awards	2022	Instagram Creator of the Year (Female)	herself	Won	
IRL Awards	2022	YouTube Partner of the Year (Female)	herself	Won	
IRL Awards	2022	People's Choice Award	herself	Won	
PMPC Star Awards for Movies	2008	Movie Child Performer of the Year	Mag-ingat Ka Sa... Kulam	Nominated	
PMPC Star Awards for Movies	2019	Loveteam of the Year (with Nash Aguas)	Class of 2018	Nominated	
PMPC Star Awards for Music	2019	Female Pop Artist of the Year	"Pa'no Ang Lahat"	Nominated	
PMPC Star Awards for Music	2021	Song of the Year (with Zack Tabudlo)	"Pusong Naliligaw"	Nominated	
PMPC Star Awards for Television	2008	Best Comedy Actress	Goin' Bulilit	Nominated	
PMPC Star Awards for Television	2009	Best Comedy Actress	Goin' Bulilit	Nominated	
PMPC Star Awards for Television	2018	Best Single Performance By An Actress	Maalaala Mo Kaya: Rubber Shoes episode	Nominated	
Push Awards	2018	Push #FriendshipGoals of the Year	herself with Miles Ocampo	Nominated	
Push Awards	2019	Push #FriendshipGoals of the Year	herself with Miles Ocampo	Nominated	
Village Pipol Awards	2023	Female TikTok Face of the Year	herself	Won	
Village Pipol Awards	2023	Online Streamer of the Year	herself	Won	
Yahoo! Celebrity Awards	2014	Love Team of the Year	herself with Nash Aguas	Nominated	
