= Mga Anghel na Walang Langit =

- Title card
- Genre: Christian drama
- Created by: ABS-CBN Studios; Pablo S. Gomez; Edgar Mortiz
- Based on: Mga Anghel na Walang Langit (1970) by Armando Herrera
- Developed by: ABS-CBN Studios
- Written by: Manny Buising; Albert Langitan; Kaye Brondial; Michiko Yamamoto
- Directed by: Maryo J. De los Reyes; Lino Cayetano; Mae Czarina Cruz
- Starring: Nikki Bagaporo; Carl John Barrameda; Miles Ocampo; Sharlene San Pedro; John Manalo
- Opening theme: "Mga Anghel na Walang Langit" by Kristel Fulgar, Nikki Bagaporo and EJ Jallorina
- Composer: Jessie Lasaten
- Country of origin: Philippines
- Original language: Filipino
- No. of episodes: 210

Production
- Executive producers: Luis F. Alejandro; Laurenti M. Dyogi; Roldeo T. Endrinal; Ellen Rodriguez; Ellen Nicolas Criste
- Production locations: Metro Manila, Philippines; Batangas, Philippines; San Rafael, Bulacan
- Running time: 30 minutes
- Production companies: Sampaguita Pictures; Dreamscape Entertainment; FPJ Productions

Original release
- Network: ABS-CBN
- Release: May 9, 2005 – February 24, 2006

Related
- May Bukas Pa; Agua Bendita; Momay; 100 Days to Heaven; Dahil sa Pag-ibig; Nathaniel; Huwag Kang Mangamba; Love in 40 Days

Mga Anghel na Walang Langit (lit. 'angels without a heaven') is a Philippine television drama series broadcast by ABS-CBN. Directed by Maryo J. De los Reyes, Lino Cayetano and Mae Czarina Cruz, it stars Nikki Bagaporo, Carl John Barrameda, Miles Ocampo, Sharlene San Pedro and John Manalo. The series is based on the 1958 film of the same title produced and written by Fernando Poe Jr. It aired on the network's Primetime Bida line up and worldwide on TFC from May 9, 2005, to February 24, 2006, replacing Spirits and was replaced by Sa Piling Mo.

== Premise ==
A group of street children with different stories unite to survive the harsh conditions and harsher realities life applies to them.

== Cast and characters ==
=== Main ===
- Nikki Bagaporo as Lorenza "Enchang" Bello – a girl with a blind mother Loleng, whom she loses after the police mistakenly accuse her of theft. Roams the streets with her friend Pepay in order to find her mother again. She is later adopted by the Sison family, and reunited with her biological father Albert.
- Carl John Barrameda as Dodong – a boy from Bacolod who leaves behind his younger sister Anet to find work in order to take care of their sick mother. Was lured into Domeng's syndicate after being offered food and he pretends to get mad at him, however. In the end, Dodong reconciles Domeng.
- Miles Ocampo as Pepay – Enchang's friend and Debra's daughter. Leaves her mother due to the latter's gambling problem, and to keep her younger siblings from being taken away. In the middle of episode, she was avoided by Debra by rejecting and now she reunites with her family.
- Sharlene San Pedro as Gigi – Cresing's daughter and Jeboy's younger sister. Leaves with Jeboy due to their mother's negligence, only to end up in Domeng's syndicate after also being offered food. Later on gets separated from her brother and is taken to Lucing's household.
- John Manalo as Jeboy – Cresing's son and Gigi's older brother. Decides to leave with Gigi due to their mother's negligence, only to end up in Domeng's syndicate after also being offered food. Jeboy gets mad at Gigi because of Lucing and then at Cresing towards Father Vincent. Once again, he reconciles Gigi next to Cresing.

=== Supporting ===
- Johnny Delgado† as Domingo "Domeng" Redondo† - Former leader of a child syndicate who obtains Dodong, Jeboy, Gigi, Enchang and Pepay. He is initially harsh towards the children, but eventually becomes a father figure who cares for their health & well-being. Domeng despises Marian and Greg for abusing the children. Later revealed to be Dodong's biological father but he denies this, making Dodong grow distant from him. He finally reconciles with Dodong but he was stabbed and shot to death by unknown men while he and Dodong went to the store to buy some ice.
- Bella Flores† as Gaudencia "Gude" Redondo-Hawkins† – Domeng's aunt. She died after she had a heart attack while arguing with Domeng during his trial.
- Maricel Laxa as Dolores "Loleng" Bello† – Enchang's blind mother and Albert's first wife who can play guitar. After being released from jail due to a misunderstanding, she sets off to find Enchang. She was later killed in an accident when she got run over by a speeding car.
- Sylvia Sanchez as Marian Lopez† – One of the adults who help run the child syndicate. Uses her kind-hearted appeal to lure children into the syndicate. Previously had a relationship with Domeng. She becomes violent and very aggressive towards the children especially after Domeng decides to go against her and Greg for their abusive tactics. Later, she is a criminal and despises Harry for what happened to Dodong. During Domeng's sabotage with Harry all night Marian killed Buknoy after he dragged him and she gave many bruises when she met him again. She falls to her death from the edge of the cliff after Domeng rejected her.
- Willie Revillame as Wowowee host.
- EJ Jallorina as Basilio "Buknoy" Quintos† – One of the children from Domeng's syndicate. He later on lives with Dodong and Edison. Later, he left Domeng's house after he had a quarrel with Dodong about fake death of his father all night and he was taken by Harry to see Marian again who eventually killed him.
- Khaycee Alaboc as Karen – one of Pepay's siblings. It is revealed she is adopted, and her biological mother is Congresswoman Agnes Francisco.
- Ryan Eigenmann as Alex† - Cresing's womanizing ex-boyfriend. At the time of their relationship, Cresing chose Alex over her own children despite his abuse towards them. He was stabbed by himself after he got drunk.
- Allen Dizon as Greg† – One of the adults who run the child syndicate led by Domeng. He is often seen drunk, and like Marian, he is also previously aggressive towards the children but he was beaten by Marian's brother Harry.
- Alma Moreno as Deborah / Debra – Pepay's mother who once had a gambling addiction. Because of this, her children run away from her. After winning the lottery, Debra is determined to find Pepay and her siblings and promises to give them all better lives.
- Ana Capri as Cresing – Jeboy and Gigi's mother. She puts her boyfriend Alex first before her own children, causing them to leave her. In an attempt to turn her life around by opening her own salon, with the help of Debra, she reunites with her kids again. However this reunion is short-lived when she grows jealous of Gigi's close relationship with Lucing and starts to see other men again, leading her to go insane once more until she gets better. She marries Father Vincent during the double wedding and she finally reconciles with Gigi and comes to terms with her jealousy issues.
- Marissa Sanchez as Lucida "Lucing" Guzman-Rodriguez – A teacher and Gigi's adoptive mother who is at first aggressive towards the child after having no choice but to take her in because of Marian. Teaches Gigi about manners and life skills and eventually warms up her. She marries Philip and they become a family together with Dorina and Gigi.
- Nash Aguas as Allan† – Gigi's neighbor and friend, who dies from an accident following an altercation between his father and maternal grandfather.
- Eliza Pineda as Sydney – Pepay and Enchang's friend.
- Lovely Rivero as Pilar – Lucing's neighbor and Allan's mother. Develops an attachment to Gigi after her son died, causing Lucing to move themselves away from her.
- Eunice Lagusad as Anet – Dodong's younger sister.
- Marianne dela Riva as Alicia† – Dodong and Anet's mother. Previously had a relationship with Domeng, resulting in Dodong.
- Alfred Labatos as Pepot – One of the children from Domeng's syndicate.
- Mylene Dizon as Ira Mercado – a social worker who helps the children adjust at the orphanage, after retrieving them from Domeng's household. When she realizes the kids love Domeng as their father figure, she drops the charges against him.
- Isko Moreno as Fr. Vincent Julio – A priest who helps run the orphanage which houses the children from Domeng's syndicate. Watches over Jeboy at the orphanage while Cresing is being treated at a psychiatric hospital.
- Jiro Manio as Jasper Sison – Enchang's foster brother who was jealous of her at first, but then learns to love her as his own sister after his mother's death from abroad. Jasper took care of Albert while he is on the wheelchair.
- Ketchup Eusebio as Ted – Edison's friend.
- Angelo Ilagan as Edison – A teenager who helps run Domeng's child syndicate (both previously mistreated children, later took care of them and now despise Greg and Marian). He was saved by Domeng after his family died in a fire. After meeting Dorina, he is motivated to start school again. He lives with Buknoy and Dodong.
- Erich Gonzales as Dorina Rodriguez – A girl in the neighbor who Edison has a crush on. Her father Philip, however, does not approve of their relationship.
- Al Tantay as Philip Rodriguez – Dorina's father who eventually starts a relationship with Lucing before their double wedding.
- Rez Cortez as Batista† - Dodong's bully.
- Hyubs Azarcon as Enteng – Debra's friend who supports her in the new chapter of her life after winning the lottery.
- John Regala† as Harieto "Harry" Lopez – Marian's brother. He torments Dodong after he saved him from the hospital. Later, they both befriend each other and he also torments Greg and Father Vincent during New Year's Eve celebration as part of his evil plan. Harry decided to separate Dodong until he attempted to hostage. He died in a gunshot by the police officers and jumped off the bridge but he is alive to sabotage Domeng following his car accident and later Buknoy until he brought to Domeng himself with a lot of bruises from his sister. In the end, Harry forgives Dodong for what he had done to him and he was sent to the mental hospital.
- Rannie Raymundo as Joe Sison – Jasper and Enchang's foster father.
- Kookoo Gonzales as Beth Sison† – Jasper and Enchang's foster mother.
- Patrick Dela Rosa† as Albert Bello – Enchang's biological father and Loleng's ex-husband. It was said that he left Loleng to become an OFW in Saudi Arabia, but he actually pursued a career as a musician in a band. Has two sons with his new wife Tere. Becomes paralyzed from the waist down after getting into an accident. He was looking after by Joe, Jasper and Enchang but he grows hatred at them so first he despised Enchang's foster's parents just like before. Albert reconciles Enchang if he gets better.
- Klaudia Koronel as Tere – Albert's 2nd wife and Enchang's stepmother. She is strict, aggressive and harsh towards Enchang for not having a stable music career that she can latch onto for money. In the end, she was getting separated by her husband that he got injured.
- Angel Sy as Colette Padilla – Gigi's best friend.
- Nathan Lopez as Nato† – Menggay's son and Dodong's friend who joins a gang because he is deaf.
- Chinggoy Alonzo† as Henry
- Kiray as Pinky – Jeboy's friend from the streets who does not like gang members at the market. She stays at the shelter center to avoid her family's problems, but later she stays at Menggay's house with Dodong next to Jeboy and eventually she decides to go back home. But was seen as a Buknoy’s gang member (cameo)
- Irma Adlawan as Menggay – a woman who takes care of Dodong and guides him about socializing gangs while she works at the market with her son Nato.
- Gloria Romero† as Doña Elena – Debra's mother and Pepay's grandmother.
- Cheska Iñigo as Cong. Agnes Francisco – a political official who decides to find her lost daughter, who is later revealed to be Pepay's sister Karen.
- Ana Roces as Mitch Olinarias – Vincent's first wife.
- Flora Gasser† as Maria
- Karel Marquez as Jane
- Efren Reyes Jr. as Mike Merandilla
- Kristoffer Horace Neudeck as Jerome
- Kim Atienza as Rolly Lopez
- Sam Concepcion as Pepay's friend
- Phoemela Barranda as TV-host
- Jenny Miller as young Gude
- Steven Fermo as Joshua
- Adriana Agcaoili as Bridgette Padilla - Colette's mother.
- Igi Boy Flores as Dut Dut

== Promotion ==
This show is the first in the lineup of Dreamscape Entertainment family and religious-oriented drama series since 2005. It was succeeded by Princess Sarah in 2007.

== Production ==
The series was announced on March 23, 2005, when ABS-CBN registered for the trademark and copyright of the show, and then its trailer for the show was released. Taping or principal photography for the series were done for 9 months from May 9, 2005, to February 24, 2006, between 2 seasons. Overall, production process of the series which included its announcement spanned for 11 months.
