= John Manalo =

Filipino actor

- Born: John Vladimir Cruz Manalo; September 6, 1995 (age 30); Marikina, Philippines
- Education: University of Santo Tomas
- Occupations: Actor, model
- Years active: 2001—present
- Agent: Star Magic (2005–2017)

John Vladimir Cruz Manalo (born September 6, 1995) is a Filipino actor who is formerly a member of ABS-CBN's circle of homegrown talents named Star Magic. He is a multi-awarded child actor. He is the nephew of Jericho Rosales.

== Career ==
Manalo starred in My First Lessons with Jollibee in which he co-stars with Nash Aguas, Sharlene San Pedro and Nikki Bagaporo.

In 2004, Manalo had his film debut Feng Shui as he played the role of Kris Aquino's son Denton. This film gave him 2 awards as 21st PMPC Awards for Movies – Best Child Performer and 2005 FAMAS Awards – Best Child Actor. And for the series of Mga Anghel na Walang Langit, Manalo got his 2 awards in The Guillermo Mendoza Memorial Foundation as Most Popular Child Actor and Best Child Performer. At a young age of 9, he became a multi-awarded child actor.

Manalo lives in Parang, Marikina with his parents (Rey and Lot), older sister ( Che) and two older brothers (Ryan and Nyep). He graduated high school at Marist School in Marikina. He took up A.B. Communication Arts in the University of Santo Tomas.

== Filmography ==
=== Film ===
Year	Title	Role
2002	Got 2 Believe	
2004	Feng Shui	Denton Ramirez
2004	Lastikman 2	Butil
2005	Say That You Love Me	Gerald
2005	Dubai	Young Andrew
2006	D' Lucky Ones	Young Lucky Boy
2008	Caregiver	Paulo Gonzales
2008	Huling Pasada	Jed
2008	Love Me Again	Anthony
2008	Dayo: Sa Mundo ng Elementalia	Carlo
2009	A Journey Home	Jake
2009	Wapakman	Michael Meneses
2009	Mano Po 6: A Mother's Love	Walden Uy
2010	Sa 'yo Lamang	Coby Alvero
2012	Alagwa	Adult Bryan

=== Television ===
Year	Title	Role
2001	Recuerdo de Amor	Young Monching Villafuerte
2004–2005	Mulawin	Boknoy
2005–2006	Mga Anghel na Walang Langit	Jeboy
2005–2008	Goin' Bulilit	Himself/Many
2006	Komiks Presents: Vulcan 5	Ronnie
2006	Komiks Presents: Da Adventures of Pedro Penduko	
2006	Salam	young Majid
2006	Wansapanataym: Magic Mantel	
2006	Maalaala Mo Kaya: Lampara	Young Albert
2006	Your Song Presents: Perslab	Tonyo Hernandez
2006	Wansapanataym: Dwendeng Bahay	Yoyoy
2007	Maalaala Mo Kaya: Diary	Toning
2007	Your Song Presents: Ikaw Lamang	
2007	Margarita	Gabby
2007	Sine'skwela	Pepe
2008	Kung Fu Kids	young Waldon
2008	Palos	young Fabio
2009	Maalaala Mo Kaya: Bola	Brando
2009	Maalaala Mo Kaya: Relo	Ryan
2009	Maalaala Mo Kaya: Lubid	Julius
2009	Nasaan Ka Maruja?	Lino
2009	Tayong Dalawa	Benong / Jomar
2009	Katorse	young Gabriel "Gabby" Arcanghel
2010	BFGF	Techno
2010	Maalaala Mo Kaya: Kariton	young/teen Efren
2010	Maalaala Mo Kaya: Pera	Johnny
2010	5 Star Special Presents: The Diamond Star: Dedma si Lolo	Mickey
2010	Habang May Buhay	young Sam
2010–2011	Shoutout! (Miyerkulitz)	Himself
2010–2011	Mara Clara	Erris Reyes
2011	Laugh Out Loud	Himself
2011	Dwarfina	young Lyndon
2011	Maria la del Barrio	young Luis Fernardo
2012	5 Girls and a Dad	
2012	Kris TV	Himself
2012	Maalaala Mo Kaya: Shorts	Raymond
2012	Oka2kat	young/teen Alfonso
2012	Maalaala Mo Kaya: Cards	Noel
2012	Maalaala Mo Kaya: Belen	Gary J
2012–2013	Princess and I	Dasho Pema Shinye
2013	Wansapanataym: Kuko Takot	Jake
2013	My Little Juan	
2013	Maria Mercedes	Young Guillermo
2014	Luv U	Jim
2014	The Singing Bee	Contestant
2014	Ipaglaban Mo: Lalaban Ang Tatay Para Sa'yo	Edmond
2014	Maalaala Mo Kaya: Abito	teen Efren
2014	Maalaala Mo Kaya: Palayan	teen Igge
2015	Bridges of Love	Tres Nakpil
2015	Ipaglaban Mo: Pinekeng Anyo	Emerson
2015	All of Me	Carlo Manalo
2015	Maalaala Mo Kaya: Rosas	young Resty Tiquia
2016	Maalaala Mo Kaya: Toga	young Allan
2016	The Greatest Love	teen Rafael "Paeng" Alegre
2016	Maalaala Mo Kaya: Armas	young Johnny
2017	Ipaglaban Mo: Pabaya	Ronnie
2017	Tadhana: Bagahe	Gerald
2019	Maalaala Mo Kaya: Flyers	teen Carlo
2019	FPJ's Ang Probinsyano	Pitoy

== Awards and nominations ==
Year	Award giving body	Category	Nominated work	Result
2005	21st PMPC Star Awards for Movies	Best Child Performer	Feng Shui	Won
2005	FAMAS Award	Best Child Actor	Feng Shui	Won
2005	Most Popular Child Performer	GMMSF Box-Office Entertainment Awards	Mga Anghel na Walang Langit	Won
2006	FAMAS Award	Best Child Actor	Dubai	Nominated
2009	FAMAS Award	Best Supporting Actor	Caregiver	Nominated
2021	12th PMPC Star Awards for Music	Music Video of the Year	"Pusong Naliligaw"	Pending
