= Carl John Barrameda =

Filipino actor

- Born: Carl John Barrameda; October 12, 1993 (age 32); Manila, Philippines
- Occupations: Actor, director
- Years active: 2002–2015
- Agent: Star Magic (2002–2015)
- Spouse: Nikolai Cimatu (m. 2020)
- Children: 1

Carl John Barrameda (born October 12, 1993) is a Filipino actor turned director working for ABS-CBN.

== Filmography ==
=== Television ===
Year	Title	Role
2015	Doble Kara	Young Julio
2013	Honesto	Young Diego
2012	Maalaala Mo Kaya: Jacket	Lito's Son
2011	Angelito: Batang Ama	Boyet
2011	Maalaala Mo Kaya: Make-up	Edison / Eric
2011	Wansapanataym: Swap	Guest
2011	Maalaala Mo Kaya: Siomai	Jovit Baldivino
2010	Maalaala Mo Kaya: Pagkain	Abe
2009	Maalaala Mo Kaya: Tsinelas	Reyniel
2009	May Bukas Pa	Ryan
2009	Maalaala Mo Kaya: Karnabal	Jessie
2009	Maalaala Mo Kaya: Medal of Valor	Young Lolong
2008	Maalaala Mo Kaya: Lason	Celoy
2007	Maalaala Mo Kaya: Yellow Sofa	Young Jerome
2006	Komiks Presents: Vulcan 5	Ding
2006	Da Adventures of Pedro Penduko	
2006	Calla Lily	Ampong
2005–2006	Mga Anghel na Walang Langit	Dodong
2005–2007	Goin' Bulilit	Various Roles
2003	Wansapanataym: Lilit Bulilit	
2003	Wansapanataym: Ang Siopao Na Ayaw sa Batang Matakaw	
2002	Wansapanataym: Incredible Chuck	

=== Film ===
Year	Title	Role
2011	Bulong	Fatima's brother
