= Bloomfield Academy =

Bloomfield Academy may refer to:

- Bloomfield Academy (Skowhegan, Maine), listed on the U.S. National Register of Historic Places (NRHP)
- Bloomfield Academy (Oklahoma), a former Chickasaw nation girls' school, the site of which is NRHP-listed
- Bloomfield Academy Center for Science and Technology, a private school in Las Piñas, Metro Manila, Philippines
