= List of Ikaw ay Pag-Ibig episodes =

Ikaw ay Pag-Ibig (transl. You Are The Love) is a Philippine family fantasy drama television series directed by Jerome Chavez Pobocan, Jojo A. Saguin, and Erick C. Salud. The series stars child actors Zaijian Jaranilla, Mutya Orquia, Louise Abuel, and Xyriel Manabat, with an ensemble cast consisting of Dimples Romana, Alfred Vargas, Mark Gil, Paulo Avelino, Bembol Roco, Yen Santos, Beverly Salviejo, Gerald Pesigan, Izzy Canillo, and Pen Medina in their supporting roles. The series premiered on ABS-CBN's Primetime Bida nighttime block, replacing 100 Days to Heaven from November 21, 2011, to January 27, 2012.

== Series overview ==
Series overview
| Season | Episodes | Originally released | |
| Season | Episodes | First released | Last released |
|---|---|---|---|
| 2011 | 30 | November 21, 2011 | December 30, 2011 |
| 2012 | 20 | January 2, 2012 | January 20, 2012 |
| Finale | 20 | January 23, 2012 | January 27, 2012 |

== Episodes ==
=== 2011 ===
| No. overall | Title | Original release date |
|---|---|---|
| 1 | "Mario and Agnes Wish the Best for Their Baby" | November 21, 2011 |
An animated introduction tells the story of four kids who learn the lessons of love with family, friends and even strangers--Ang Apat na Batang Apostol. In the opener, the Mayor (Mark Gil) disapproves of his daughter Agnes' (Dimples Romana) relationship with Mario, an aspiring painter (Alfred Vargas). Agnes learns she is pregnant and they decide to elope, but the mayor's henchmen kill Mario, making it appear that Mario fled from his responsibilities by leaving Agnes behind. When the mayor learns that Agnes is pregnant, he sends her to another province until she gives birth. While in exile, she makes a wish to the Infant Jesus to protect her baby in a scene that ends with a burst of light. As she is about to give birth on Christmas eve, Agnes learns that her father plans to take her baby and give it up for adoption. Agnes flees and gives birth to baby Julius in a 'manger.' With the mayor's henchmen in hot pursuit, Agnes entrusts her baby to the young boy (Nash Aguas) who found her, with instructions to bring him safely to church. Unable to do so, he leaves the baby in the forest and leads the henchmen in another direction. Married couple Isko (Smokey Manaloto) and Caring (Arlene Muhlach) driving through the backroads - hear the baby's cries and decide to bring young Julius with them, and away from harm's way. The henchmen catch up with the boy and force him to show where he left the baby. With the baby gone, the mayor threatens the boy unless he tells Agnes that the baby died accidentally. A devastated Agnes is forcibly brought back home, filled with hate for her father. Isko and Caring bring the baby home on Christmas Day and name him Francisco, Jr. or Nonoy, while Agnes decides to leave for good. The succeeding years pass happily and quickly for Isko, Caring and Nonoy. stery, the kid cannot help but long for the love of his real mother.
| 2 | "A Joyful Ride Turns Into a Terrible Accident" | November 22, 2011 |
Isko and Caring share the meaning of Christmas with Nonoy. And in a series of intercuts, the other children Tinay (Mutya Orquia) and Edison (Louise Abuel) are introduced along with their respective fathers (Danilo Barrios, Jhong Hilario). A snatcher steals a cellphone from a passenger and Nonoy chases after him. It turns out the owner is Agnes--marking the meeting of mother and son. Agnes, who has pursued her teaching advocacy, urges Nonoy to start attending public school instead of being home schooled by Isko and Caring. The situation poses a problem for Nonoy's adoptive parents who have yet to tell Nonoy the truth. The lives of Nonoy, Tinay and Edison intersect after a vehicular accident kills their parents. Andrew (Paulo Avelino), who moments earlier was involved in a gang fight, inadvertently triggered the collision.
| 3 | "Nonoy Can't Accept That His Parents Are Dead" | November 23, 2011 |
Tinay and Edison commiserate with each other. Agnes arrives at the scene with the DSWD offering support for the two kids. Elsewhere, Andrew arrives home and is confronted by his policeman father (Bembol Roco) about the accident. The relationships of Tinay and Edison with their fathers are shown through flashback as Agnes takes an interest in their welfare. At the hospital, Nonoy finally regains consciousness and only learns of his parents' death then. At the orphanage, Tinay and Edison have a hard time adjusting as they are bullied by the other children. Meanwhile, Nonoy escapes from the hospital rather than agreeing to be sent to the orphanage. Agnes asks for the police officer's help to look for him. Tinay and Edison bond at the orphanage; Nonoy uses his wits and lessons learned from Isko to survive in the streets.
| 4 | "The Kids Learn to Be Patient and Trust That God Will Lead Them to a Better Future" | November 24, 2011 |
Nonoy's streetwise abilities help him cope with his wandering. Edison and Tinay decide to put an end to their suffering in the orphanage.
| 5 | "The Kids Stick with Each Other Through Thick and Thin" | November 25, 2011 |
Edison and Tinay succeed in escaping the orphanage and crosses paths with Nonoy. The three get together and find an abandoned house to live in.
| 6 | "Agnes Disapproves of Inspector Robert's Approach in Protecting the Stowaway Children" | November 28, 2011 |
Inspector Robert finds out where Edison and Tinoy have been and who they were with all along.
| 7 | "Agnes Changes Her Approach in Talking to the Kids" | November 29, 2011 |
Nonoy, Edison and Tinay find an abandoned baby at their doorstep just as when news about the missing miraculous infant Jesus statue spreads around.
| 8 | "Baby Rafa Is Missing" | November 30, 2011 |
Angelica becomes part of Nonoy, Edison and Tinay's company. Nonoy continues to disapprove of having Baby Rafa as their responsibility.
| 9 | "The Kids Turn on Each Other After Baby Rafa Goes Missing" | December 1, 2011 |
Nonoy, Edison, Tinay and Angelica find a prospective parent for Baby Rafa, and they have their eyes set on Agnes.
| 10 | "Nonoy and His Peers Try to Find the Perfect Parents for Baby Rafa" | December 2, 2011 |
The children eye a childless couple and a single teacher as potential parents for Baby Rafa.
| 11 | "Will Angelica Ever Find Her Parents?" | December 5, 2011 |
Nonoy, Edison, Tinay, and Angelica are determined to find a loving set of parents for Rafa. Meanwhile, Agnes and Ising discover that the children are keeping a baby under their care.
| 12 | "Will Agnes Let the Children Take Care of Baby Rafa?" | December 6, 2011 |
Nonoy, Angelica, Tinay, and Edison attempt to trace Baby Rafa's origins. Andrew conspires with a crime syndicate to find the missing miraculous infant Jesus statue. Luis is furious over his plan gone awry.
| 13 | "Angelica Receives a Message from a Bird" | December 7, 2011 |
In his desire to get money through illegal means, Andrew unknowingly puts himself and the people around him in danger. Rafa's origins. Andrew conspires with a crime syndicate to find the missing miraculous infant Jesus statue. Luis is furious over his plan gone awry.
| 14 | "Leandro and Nonoy Cross Paths" | December 8, 2011 |
Michelle's injury lays revelations out in the open: Andrew's feelings for her and his uncanny reaction at the sight of her father.
| 15 | "The Gang Meets a New Friend" | December 9, 2011 |
In their search for Baby Rafa's real parents, the children meet an old man who is more than willing to help them out.
| 16 | "Andrew Must Correct His Past Decision" | December 12, 2011 |
Pidyong tells the children that it was his selfishness that caused him to become estranged from his family.
| 17 | "The Children Notify Lolo Pedro's Family about His Condition" | December 13, 2011 |
The children strive to reconcile Lolo Pidyong with his children. Fate brings Agnes and Aling Ima together, and Agnes learns that her son may be alive.
| 18 | "After Discovering the Truth, Agnes Is Very Hopeful in Seeing Her Child Again" | December 14, 2011 |
Nonoy, Angelica, Tinay and Edison succeed in reconciling Lolo Pidyong with his children.
| 19 | "The Kids Influenced the Judge to Make the Right Decision" | December 15, 2011 |
The children meet a rich court judge and unknowingly change him back to his honest ways.
| 20 | "How Can Andrew Correct His Mistakes?" | December 16, 2011 |
Andrew sets out to confront his inner demons in order to love Michelle freely, and to be completely honest with his father. The children meet a kindhearted puto bumbong (steamed glutinous rice) vendor named Aida.
| 21 | "Aida Works Hard to See Her Child in Hong Kong" | December 19, 2011 |
Two mothers long to reunite with their estranged children as Agnes and Aida continue their search. Meanwhile, Andrew faces his past in order to clear his conscience.
| 22 | "Andrew Helps Agnes Find Her Child" | December 20, 2011 |
Fate allows Andrew to correct his mistake when he and Agnes meet at the stables once again. Nonoy is faced with the tough decision of giving Rafa up.
| 23 | "Can Mario Be of Any Help to Agnes?" | December 21, 2011 |
Nonoy tries to explain his decision to his friends, but they remain indifferent to his pleas. Meanwhile, Robert turns down Cong. Luis' request for information regarding the missing statue.
| 24 | "Angelica Is the Only One Who Can Hear Her Friend Pigeon" | December 22, 2011 |
Mario learns the truth behind his imprisonment and vows to exact revenge on Cong. Luis. Meanwhile, Cong. Luis discovers a link between the children and the missing statue.
| 25 | "How Long Can the Kids Protect Baby Rafa?" | December 23, 2011 |
The children are separated from one another in their struggle to flee from Luis' bodyguards. Meanwhile, Mario escapes prison.
| 26 | "Andrew and Agnes Follow a False Lead Again" | December 26, 2011 |
Agnes falls apart upon learning what happened to Julius. She blames her father for her son's death, despising him even more.
| 27 | "Although Still in the Dark from the Truth, Nonoy Meets His Father for the First Time" | December 27, 2011 |
Nonoy crosses paths with Mario who easily becomes his friend. After parting ways in San Gabriel, Nonoy senses impending danger awaiting Mario and decides to follow him. Meanwhile, Andrew finally opens up to his father.
| 28 | "Will Agnes Give Mario Another Chance?" | December 28, 2011 |
After 10 years, Agnes and Mario cross paths once again. Despite her ill feelings for the man, Agnes helps Mario flee from the police because of his critical condition.
| 29 | "Agnes Discovers Another Shocking Truth" | December 29, 2011 |
The news of Julius' death gives Mario all the more reason to seek revenge on Luis. Meanwhile, Nonoy comforts Agnes in her longing for Julius.
| 30 | "Mario and Agnes Discovers Nonoy's and Their Son's Similarities" | December 30, 2011 |
Agnes tells Nonoy that Mario is the father of her baby. Obet and Jackstone proceed with their plan to rob a house. Agnes brings Mario to the place where she gave birth to their baby.

=== 2012 ===
| No. overall | Title | Original release date |
|---|---|---|
| 31 | "Nonoy Celebrates His Birthday" | January 2, 2012 |
Contrary to his fears of spending his birthday alone, Nonoy gets to celebrate Christmas with Angelica and his real parents.
| 32 | "Agnes Has a Better Plan for the Kids" | January 3, 2012 |
The children are reunited through a series of fortunate events. Their reunion, however, might just be temporary because of Agnes' act of charity.
| 33 | "Nonoy Discovers That He Might Be Adopted" | January 4, 2012 |
A fateful meeting with his late parents' friends makes Nonoy question his real identity.
| 34 | "Nonoy Asks Around to Discover His Real Identity" | January 5, 2012 |
The children discover that they have been tricked by Agnes and the hospital personnel. Nonoy breaks away from his friends to determine his true identity. Andrew promises to fight for Michelle's love despite the danger that Cong. Luis poses.
| 35 | "Nonoy Can't Believe That He's Adopted" | January 6, 2012 |
Nonoy finally confirms the painful truth about himself. Meanwhile, Angelica is left to protect Rafa on her own after Tinay and Edison are both caught. Luis discovers Michelle's relationship with Andrew.
| 36 | "Nonoy, Angelica, Edison and Tinay Go There Separate Ways" | January 9, 2012 |
Nonoy reunites with Angelica and Rafa. Tinay and Edison painfully separate ways as they go home to their new families. New information confirms Robert's suspicion about Manolito Luciano's connection with Cong. Luis.
| 37 | "Leandro Makes Sure That Robert and Andrew Will Suffer at His Feet" | January 10, 2012 |
After discovering Andrew's identity, Luis has Andrew kidnapped and warns him to stay away from Michelle. Andrew reveals to Luis their first encounter in San Gabriel. Michelle learns about Robert's investigation on the missing infant Jesus and vows that she herself will arrest her father once they prove him guilty. Nonoy is left alone to protect Rafa after Luis' men capture Angelica in their search for the infant Jesus.
| 38 | "Andrew Continues to Spend Time with Michelle" | January 11, 2012 |
Nonoy finally finds the hospital where Rafa's towel came from. A man claiming to be Rafa's father, however, kidnaps the baby. Andrew gets arrested for allegedly trafficking drugs.
| 39 | "Nonoy Asks the Lord for Help to Save Baby Rafa" | January 12, 2012 |
After learning of Luis’s involvement in Andrew’s arrest, Michelle decides to leave her father. Max contemplates on returning Rafa to Nonoy.
| 40 | "Will Rafa Be Sent to China?" | January 13, 2012 |
Max gets into deep trouble when he realizes that the syndicate he works for has harmful plans for Rafa. Sam leads Angelica to the person who will tell her about her real identity.
| 41 | "Angelica Remembers That She Is an Angel" | January 16, 2012 |
With Gabriel's help, Angelica remembers her true identity and the mistake that she has to rectify. With Marieta gone, Gerry and Steph maltreat Tinay. Edison finds a way to run away from his family and help Nonoy rescue Rafa.
| 42 | "Edison Sneaks Out from His Foster Parents" | January 17, 2012 |
Nonoy and Edison rescue Tinay from her abusive foster family. Angelica decides to join her friends again to complete her mission. Jackstone and Obet join Nonoy, Angelica, Tinay, and Edison in their mission to rescue Rafa.
| 43 | "The Kids Unite to Save Rafa" | January 18, 2012 |
Nonoy and his friends succeed in rescuing Rafa from the syndicate. The children realize a connection between Rafa and the missing statue of the Infant Jesus.
| 44 | "Leandro Wants Andrew to Have the Worst Time in Jail" | January 19, 2012 |
The children succeed in returning Rafa to the church of San Gabriel, but they are surprised to find out that the statue of the Infant Jesus has disappeared the next morning. Congressman Luis learns that he has liver cancer.
| 45 | "The Kids Are Surprised to See Rafa with Leandro" | January 20, 2012 |
Andrew has a brush with death when he is illegally taken out of prison by a corrupt policeman. He then puts his second lease at life to good use when he encounters the children, who are now in danger after successfully rescuing Rafa from Cong. Luis.
Ikaw ay Pag-Ibig: Ang Huling Linggo (The Last Week/The Last 5 Nights)
| 46 | "Andrew's Death Helps Solve Baby Rafa's Disappearance" | January 23, 2012 |
Andrew dies from saving Nonoy. Nonoy, Angelica, Tinay, and Edison finally return the Infant Jesus to San Gabriel. The people of San Gabriel give Andrew a Hero's Burial while Andrew's friends expose Luis' involvement in the case of the missing Infant Jesus.
| 47 | "Leandro Wants to Kidnap Nonoy" | January 24, 2012 |
Instead of fleeing, Luis insists on taking revenge on Nonoy. Angelica finally breaks the truth to Nonoy, Tinay, and Edison about her identity and her past failure.
| 48 | "Agnes Wants to Save Nonoy from Her Father" | January 25, 2012 |
After hearing news about Nonoy's disappearance, Mario sets out to look for the boy and to exact revenge on Cong. Luis. Meanwhile, Nonoy nurses the ailing Cong. Luis.
| 49 | "A Car Hits Nonoy!" | January 26, 2012 |
Mario's hunger for revenge puts Nonoy's life in danger. Agnes desire to help Nonoy leads her to the truth about their real relationship.
| 50 | "Love, Forgiveness and Faith Will Guide Everyone to the Right Path" | January 27, 2012 |
Cong. Luis reconciles with his daughters. Meanwhile, Nonoy's mysterious friend helps him choose between dying or continuing to live for his loved ones.
