= Mutya (disambiguation) =

Mutya is a Philippine TV series.

Mutya can also refer to:

== People ==
- Mutya Buena (born 1985), an English singer
- Mutya Orquia (born 2006), a Filipina actress
- Mutya Johanna Datul (born 1992), a Filipina beauty queen

== Others ==
- Mutya ng Pilipinas, an annual national beauty pageant in the Philippines

== See also ==
- Ang Mutya ng Section E, a 2025 Philippine television series
- Mutia (disambiguation)
