= List of The Promise of Forever episodes =

The Promise of Forever is a 2017 Philippine, romantic fantasy drama television series starring Paulo Avelino, Ritz Azul and Ejay Falcon. The series aired on ABS-CBN's Kapamilya Gold afternoon block and worldwide on The Filipino Channel from September 11, 2017 to November 24, 2017, replacing The Better Half.

This fantasy drama is about Lorenzo (Paulo Avelino), a man who lives under the curse of immortality. Due to a tragic loss, he decides to turn his back on love but all of this will change when Sophia (Ritz Azul) comes unexpectedly in his life. As things are starting to get better, his past starts to haunt him. Can he hide the truth forever or will time reveal his secret?

== Series overview ==
Season	Episodes	Originally released	
Season	Episodes	First released	Last released
1	55	September 11, 2017	November 24, 2017

== Episodes ==
=== Season 1 (2017) ===
No. overall	No. in season	Title	Original release date	Kantar Media Ratings (Nationwide)	AGB Nielsen Ratings (NUTAM People)
1	1	"Immortal Man"	September 11, 2017	18.4%	5.5%
The Pilot tells the story of Lorenzo Espinosa (Paulo Avelino) and how he became the immortal man. And how he met Sophia (Mutya Orquia). Fast forward to 1988, his son's demise prompts him to change his identity to Emil. Ten years later, Emil crosses paths with a distressed young girl named Sophia whose father left her recently. The immortal man leaves a lasting imprint on Sophia's life.
2	2	"Nicolas Barrientos"	September 12, 2017	18.1%	6.3%
Years after moving to Manila, Sophia (Ritz Azul) finally decides to pursue her lifelong dream of working on a cruise ship. She becomes more determined when she learns of her family's financial problems. But before Sophia leaves, Philip (Ejay Falcon) makes his intentions toward her clear. Meanwhile, Lorenzo decides that it is time to put his identity as Nicolas Barrientos to rest. As a last hurrah, he decides to go on one last cruise before finally moving on.
3	3	"Begin Again"	September 13, 2017	14.9%	4.9%
Sophia arrives in Amsterdam to a warm welcome from her best friend, Glenda (Yana Asistio). As they tour around the city, Glenda briefs Sophia about what to expect at work. Meanwhile, Nicolas remains under the radar as he boards the cruise ship. He unknowingly crosses paths with Sophia and rouses her interest. Elsewhere, Marlon (Tonton Gutierrez) receives a new lead on Lorenzo.
4	4	"Stalker"	September 14, 2017	15.1%	4.6%
Unable to contain her curiosity, Sophia searches the ship for the mysterious passenger. All her attempts, however, end up in failure. Fortunately, Sophia comes across the mysterious man while disembarking and decides to follow him in Bruges. Meanwhile, Nicolas donates some blood in hopes that it will help develop a cure for cancer. On his way back to the ship, he sees Sophia in the arms of a suspicious man.
5	5	"Connection"	September 15, 2017	15.8%	4.8%
Unable to contain her curiosity, Sophia searches the ship for the mysterious passenger. All her attempts, however, end up in failure. Fortunately, Sophia comes across the mysterious man while disembarking and decides to follow him in Bruges. Meanwhile, Nicolas donates some blood in hopes that it will help develop a cure for cancer. On his way back to the ship, he sees Sophia in the arms of a suspicious man.
6	6	"Body Search"	September 18, 2017	14.4%	4.2%
Sophia finds herself in an awkward situation with Nicolas. A near-death incident brings Sophia and Nicolas closer. Determined to uncover Helen's secret, Marlon makes an effort to get closer to her. Longing for his girlfriend, Philip decides to follow Sophia. Nicolas and Sophia grow closer as they spend more time together.
7	7	"Danger"	September 19, 2017	14.1%	N/A
However, Nicolas suddenly withdraws from Sophia after learning that Helen was attacked. He becomes even more desperate to find a cure for his immortality. Marlon, meanwhile, continues to stalk Helen.
8	8	"Closer"	September 20, 2017	13.9%	N/A
Sophia braves the storm to save Nicolas. Her selfless act touches Nicolas and their relationship soon blossoms. Meanwhile, Helen becomes aware of George's deception.
9	9	"Goodbye, Sophia"	September 21, 2017	14.1%	4.1%
Nicholas soon decides that they would be better off cutting ties with each other. Marlon, meanwhile, is severely disappointed after losing track of Helen. He later receives a visit from a colleague who insists on helping him locate Lorenzo.
10	10	"Immortal Man's Kiss"	September 22, 2017	15.9%	4.8%
Nicolas tours Sophia around Prague. Their budding romance starts to blossom as they visit the city's tourist spots. However, their fun is cut short by an unexpected tragedy. Meanwhile, Philip arrives in Hamburg. He then decides to board the ship to surprise Sophia.
11	11	"The Big Secret"	September 25, 2017	14.1%	3.9%
Sophia finds herself on pins and needles after failing to find Nicolas in the spot where he was stabbed. Her friend's sudden disappearance compels her to search for answers. As she worries about Nicolas, an unwelcome guest pays her a surprise visit.
12	12	"Sophia's Search"	September 26, 2017	13.2%	3.8%
Bing, on the other hand, tries to find ways to prevent Sophia from knowing Nicolas’ big secret. Meanwhile, Helen becomes determined to unmask Marlon.
13	13	"Alibi"	September 27, 2017	11.3%	3.4%
Sophia's desperate search for Nicolas finally bears fruit after she accidentally crossed paths with him on her way back to the ship. Concerned about his stab wound, Sophia insists on verifying Nicolas’ condition with her own eyes. The two later share another farewell as Sophia returns to her job. Bothered by their parting, Nicolas thinks twice about his decision to change his identity. Meanwhile, Philip persistently tries to get his childhood friend's attention.
14	14	"Confession"	September 28, 2017	13.1%	3.8%
Sophia runs into Nicolas in Norway and learns that he has returned to the cruise. Happy to be together again, the two grow closer to one another. Later, Glenda invites Nicolas to her party where he joins the crew in their games. After the celebration, an inebriated Sophia finally confesses her feelings for Nicolas. Philip, on the other hand, extracts an important promise from Sophia.
15	15	"Termination"	September 29, 2017	12.2%	4.2%
Meanwhile, Philip continues to pursue Sophia despite being turned down by the latter. He sets another plan to win Sophia's heart but the repercussions of his actions put Sophia's job and life in jeopardy. Nicolas, meanwhile, tries to rescue Sophia from the dilemmas she is facing.
16	16	"Separate Lives"	October 2, 2017	12.2%	3.7%
A dejected Sophia returns to the Philippines after losing her job. Sophia then pours out her anger toward Philip as the latter confronts her about her feelings. Later, Sophia gets emotional after recalling her memories with Nicolas in Prague. Meanwhile, Nicolas asks Bing to get Sophia's contact information despite initially deciding not to go after her anymore. Much to Helen's puzzlement, Nicolas also decides to keep his current identity.
17	17	"Encounter"	October 3, 2017	13.1%	3.9%
Determined to help her family with their finances, Sophia starts looking for a new job. However, her bad record immediately turns off her potential employers. Nicolas, meanwhile, continues his search for Sophia. He also informs Bing and Helen that he will be more active in finding a cure for his immortality. Elsewhere, Marlon brings in Philip to help him find the elusive Lorenzo. Later, Marlon unknowingly crosses paths with the person he is desperately searching for.
18	18	"The Cure"	October 4, 2017	11.9%	3.3%
Eager to start a relationship with Sophia, Nicolas becomes even more determined to find a cure for his immortality. However, before anything else, Nicolas tries to make amends with Sophia. Unfortunately for Nicolas, the girl in question is actively avoiding him. Sophia, on the other hand, continues to take temporary jobs to help her family with their debts.
19	19	"Witness"	October 5, 2017	12.9%	3.9%
Nicolas gives Sophia an unwelcome gift. Annoyed by his presumptuousness, Sophia asks Nicolas to keep his distance for a while. Undeterred, Nicolas continues to use his wealth and connections to secretly aid Sophia. One of his attempts, however, leads to serious consequences.
20	20	"The Promise"	October 6, 2017	12.3%	3.5%
During a photography workshop, Sophia is tasked to teach Nicolas. The two become more drawn to each other as she assists him with his shot compositions. However, their fun is cut short when the venue of the workshop catches fire, prompting Sophia to be plagued by her traumatic experience.
21	21	"Mr. Forever"	October 9, 2017	12.6%	3.8%
Just as when Nicolas admits his feelings for Sophia, she decides to end their relationship. He then resolves to work harder to find a cure for his immortality, hoping that having a normal life will give him a better chance to fight for his and Sophia's relationship.
22	22	"Fight For Love"	October 10, 2017	12.6%	4.1%
Sophia crosses paths with Nicolas during Lucille's event. Troubled over his mixed signals, Sophia finally expresses her exasperation over him. However, before they could reach an understanding, Sophia receives a call from Vivienne informing her that Faye is missing. With Nicolas’ help, Sophia looks for her missing grandmother. Later, Nicolas finds a formula that may finally cure his immortality.
23	23	"Hope"	October 11, 2017	11.8%	3.7%
Eager to cure his immortality, Nicolas uses the untested formula. His gamble pays off when a wound he inflicted on himself does not heal. Elated, Nicolas makes plans to pursue a relationship with Sophia. He gets his chance after bumping into Sally and Henry. Meanwhile, the Madrids learn that Faye has Alzheimer's disease.
24	24	"In Your Eyes"	October 12, 2017	11.6%	3.9%
Helen begins to panic after seeing a report about an immortal man. She later insists that Nicolas change his identity immediately. Elsewhere, Philip, determined to prove himself to Marlon, accepts the task of finding the elusive Lorenzo.
25	25	"Second Chance"	October 13, 2017	13.4%	4.1%
Unable to contain his feelings for Sophia anymore, Nicolas asks her for another chance to prove himself. However, Sophia turns him down because of her fear. Nicolas then thinks of a way to persuade Sophia.
26	26	"Meet Up"	October 16, 2017	12.9%	4.1%
Sophia realizes her true feelings for Nicolas after saving him from drowning. She then gives their relationship a chance after Nicolas encouraged her to follow her heart's desire. Meanwhile, Bing visits the man who witnessed Nicolas’ revival after a shooting incident. Later, Marlon comes across Nicolas inside his company.
27	27	"Birthday Wish"	October 17, 2017	12.4%	3.8%
While spending time with Nicolas, Sophia realizes that he is slowly fulfilling her birthday wish. Meanwhile, Nicolas resolves to pursue a relationship with Sophia despite its consequences. Philip ends up heartbroken after confirming that Sophia is in love with another man.
28	28	"The Sign"	October 18, 2017	12.4%	3.6%
Nicolas prepares a sweet surprise for Sophia before confessing his love for her. The two also spend a wonderful time at a nursing home. Meanwhile, Helen discovers vital information about the man searching for Nicolas.
29	29	"Accident"	October 19, 2017	12.2%	3.8%
Excited to introduce Nicolas to her family, Sophia eagerly waits for him to arrive at her birthday celebration. However, Nicolas, Helen, and Bing meet an unexpected tragedy on their way to Sophia's house. Helen comes across Marlon and ends up in a compromising situation in her attempt to keep him from seeing Lorenzo.
30	30	"The Revelation"	October 20, 2017	12.9%	4.5%
Nicolas makes it up to Sophia after failing to show up on her birthday party. Nicolas then comforts Sophia as she blames herself for Philip's suffering. Later, Nicolas finds out the temporary effect of the cure he was working on. Meanwhile, Bing and Helen do a background check on Marlon and discover his connection with Sophia. Elsewhere, Philip is devastated about Sophia's revelation. After Marlon lashed out at him with insults, Philip answers by showing him the accomplishment of his task.
31	31	"Kidnapped"	October 23, 2017	12.3%	4.2%
Helen decides to talk to Sophia, thinking that her relationship with Nicolas will keep putting his life at risk. However, before she could meet Sophia, Helen gets herself into danger. Despite his suspicion that he is the real target of Helen's assailants, Nicolas risks his life to save his foster daughter. Meanwhile, Sophia and the Madrids become worried when Faye goes missing again.
32	32	"Rescue"	October 24, 2017	13.0%	4.6%
Nicolas puts his life on the line to save Helen and Faye. In a struggle that ensued between him and Marlon's men, Nicolas finds himself heavily wounded. This eventful encounter paves the way for Faye to uncover Nicolas' secret. She tries to tell her family about what she witnessed, but they refuse to believe her story. Later, Nicolas begins to grasp the consequences of having a relationship with Sophia.
33	33	"Break Up"	October 25, 2017	12.6%	3.4%
Meanwhile, Sophia notices that Nicolas is becoming distant toward her. Nicolas, on the other hand, realizes that his reckless decisions are putting his loved ones in peril. He then comes up with a drastic decision involving Sophia.
34	34	"About Time"	October 26, 2017	11.7%	4.1%
Puzzled by the reason behind their sudden breakup, Sophia reaches out to her ex-boyfriend's loved one and manages to find a vital lead. Later, Sophia makes a bold move in the name of love. Meanwhile, Nicolas arrives at the place where he plans to fake his death. Elsewhere, the Borjas draw closer in finding the immortal man.
35	35	"Reunited"	October 27, 2017	12.3%	3.2%
Upon finding Nicolas in a resort, Sophia asks him why he left her. Despite Sophia's begging, Nicolas drives her away and decides to continue with his plans. Meanwhile, Michael and his men arrive in Isla Bughaw. There they start their task to capture the immortal man. When Nicolas finds out that he is tracked by the Borjas, he makes a desperate attempt to outrun them and keep Sophia safe.
36	36	"The Death of Nicolas"	October 30, 2017	12.1%	3.7%
Lorenzo tries to evade Michael and his men. Knowing that he has nowhere to go, Lorenzo makes the ultimate sacrifice. Soon, Lorenzo resolves to leave behind his life as Nicolas to keep Sophia safe from his enemies. In the meantime, Sophia is left in a state of shock after seeing the man he loves the most jump off a cliff. However, Sophia hopes against hope that Nicolas is still alive.
37	37	"Goodbye, Nicolas"	October 31, 2017	11.7%	4.6%
Lorenzo moves in to Poland with Bing to start a new life. However, Lorenzo continues to long for Sophia. Meanwhile, Sophia grieves over Nicolas’ untimely death. With her family's help, she soon learns to accept his loss. Elsewhere, Marlon finds a way to locate Helen.
38	38	"Helen's Death"	November 1, 2017	11.5%	3.9%
Marlon finally locates Helen in Cebu. Wasting no time, Marlon asks Helen where Lorenzo is hiding. In the middle of their confrontation, a tragic accident ensues. Lorenzo, meanwhile, is forced to return to the Philippines after receiving terrible news about his adopted daughter. Elsewhere, Sophia gets back on her feet after Nicolas’ death.
39	39	"Hello, Laurence"	November 2, 2017	13.2%	4.2%
Nicolas and Bing assume new identities in Poland as Laurence Molina and Matthew Santos. Back in the Philippines, Sophia begins a new life by seeking a new job. However, a new problem arises just when things are going well for her. Elsewhere, Marlon becomes even more determined to find the immortal man despite his investors' unwillingness to support him.
40	40	"The Proposal"	November 3, 2017	13.5%	4.0%
While in Poland, Laurence makes up his mind to finally leave the past behind and move on with his life. He returns to medicine and finds solace in his new life as a doctor as he discovers his new purpose. Sophia, meanwhile, bounces back from the devastating blow she encountered. She bravely raises her child with Nicolas as a single parent. Elsewhere, Marlon draws closer to finding the immortal man.
41	41	"Bloodline"	November 6, 2017	14.2%	3.7%
Upon learning that a group of unknown men are after Matthew, Lawrence realizes that their lives are in danger again. Because of this, the two immediately escape to Prague. Coincidentally, Sophia and Adrien, together with Philip, travel to the same city. An incident then leads Lawrence to cross paths with Sophia's son. Elsewhere, Marlon and Michael are still out to find the immortal man.
42	42	"The Return"	November 7, 2017	14.2%	3.9%
Fed up with Marlon's failures, Cooper threatens his life. Fortunately, Marlon manages to convince Cooper to give him another chance. He, however, is forced to make several grim decisions regarding Borja Pharmaceuticals. Meanwhile, Lawrence returns to the Philippines to find out the truth about Adrien.
43	43	"Confirmed"	November 8, 2017	13.3%	3.8%
Sophia gets pressured into making early preparations for her wedding with Philip. However, she is well-aware that she does not see Philip in the same light as Nicolas. At Adrien's school, Sophia is taken aback upon seeing Lawrence, a man who bears a striking resemblance to her departed lover. Lawrence, meanwhile, receives confirmation that Adrien is his son.
44	44	"The Confession"	November 9, 2017	14.8%	4.3%
Matthew and Lawrence agree to meet with Eddie to discuss the latter's discoveries regarding Borja Pharmaceutical. However, they soon realize that they have walked into a trap. Elsewhere, Sophia finds proof that Nicolas and Lawrence are connected. She later confronts Lawrence upon finding a cherished memento among his belongings. Left with no choice, Lawrence confesses his true identity to Sophia and begs her for the chance to get to know Adrien.
45	45	"Father and Son"	November 10, 2017	13.6%	4.2%
Sophia grants Lawrence's request to spend a day with Adrien. After cherishing precious moments with his son, Nicolas is prepared to disappear from Sophia's and Adrien's lives. However, Lawrence makes a shocking discovery that prevents him from leaving. Aware that she could not reciprocate Philip's love for her, Sophia calls off her engagement to her childhood friend. Meanwhile, Lawrence is propelled to cross paths with somebody he's been avoiding.
46	46	"Face to Face"	November 13, 2017	11.7%	4.1%
An unexpected visitor of the Borjas surprises Sophia and Philip. Unable to contain his jealousy, Philip gets into a fistfight with Lawrence. Meanwhile, Marlon and Michael find a possible investor for their company.
47	47	"Admission"	November 14, 2017	12.5%	3.8%
Sophia's rejection starts to take its toll on Philip. To make matters worse, he soon discovers that Lawrence is Adrien's biological father. Fueled by anger and jealousy, Philip engages Lawrence in a fight. Meanwhile, Lawrence is determined to keep Adrien out of Marlon's reach. However, Lawrence realizes that in order to convince Sophia to listen to him, he must reveal the truth about his complicated life.
48	48	"No Death"	November 15, 2017	12.5%	4.1%
Lawrence reveals to Sophia that he is immortal. Sophia, however, dismisses his claims, assuming that they are lies to excuse his abandonment of her. Soon after, Marlon tries to convince Lawrence to invest in his quest to invent a miracle drug.
49	49	"Link"	November 16, 2017	12.9%	4.0%
Lawrence informs the Madrids of the danger Marlon Borja poses to Adrien. Unknown to Lawrence, Marlon is beginning to develop reservations toward him upon uncovering a discrepancy regarding his identity. Unwilling to put his company at risk, Marlon confronts Lawrence. Meanwhile, Philip refuses to give up on Sophia despite her constant rejection. He instead decides to investigate Lawrence with the goal of removing him from Sophia's life.
50	50	"Setup"	November 17, 2017	11.5%	3.8%
Hoping to keep Adrien safe, Geoffrey agrees to take the necessary steps to protect his family. Meanwhile, Lawrence agrees to a meeting with Marlon. Unknown to him, however, is that Marlon has already found out the truth.
51	51	"Betryal"	November 20, 2017	11.3%	3.6%
Despite finding himself in grave danger, Lawrence manages to escape from Marlon with Matthew's help. Determined to hunt down the immortal man, Marlon enlists Olivia's help in locating Lawrence. Obliging to her husband's request, Olivia comes up with a scheme in order to get information from the Madrids. With this, the Borjas become successful in tracking down Lawrence's whereabouts. Soon, however, the safety of one of Lawrence's loved ones is put at risk.
52	52	"Revenge"	November 21, 2017	11.8%	3.7%
Marlon lashes out at Olivia for her betrayal. Alarmed with her husband's erratic behavior, Olivia takes Philip away and seeks help from the Madrids. On the other hand, Michael's death only fuels Marlon's obsessive pursuit of Lorenzo. However, Marlon finds himself in a bind as Robert seizes all his assets for failing to pay off his huge debt. Meanwhile, in hopes of a normal life for him and Adrien, Lawrence resolves to find a cure for their immortality.
53	53	"Negotiation"	November 22, 2017	11.2%	3.4%
After accepting Lawrence's wedding proposal, Sophia looks forward to starting a new life with her family abroad. However, Philip is still determined to take her and Adrien away from Lawrence. As he acts on his plan, Philip unintentionally leads Marlon to Sophia and Adrien's location. Not wasting any time, Marlon kidnaps Sophia and Adrien. He later contacts Lawrence and gives him an ultimatum – him in exchange for his family.
54	54	"Face Off"	November 23, 2017	12.8%	3.9%
Lawrence gives Marlon the immortality formula in exchange for Sophia and Adrien's freedom. However, Marlon reneges on his end of the deal and decides to keep the entire family captive. Marlon then prepares a torturous setup to exact his revenge on Lorenzo for the deaths of his father and son. Unknown to him, Philip has managed to escape from his bonds. After saving Adrien, Philip promises the child that he will reunite him with his parents.
55	55	"Final Promise"	November 24, 2017	14.7%	4.7%
Sophia rushes Philip to the hospital after he took a bullet for her. Despite being on the verge of losing his life, Philip remains worried for Sophia and Adrien's safety. With Marlon detained, Lawrence focuses on his promise to live a normal life with Sophia and Adrien. However, Lawrence knows that he must give up his immortality in order to fulfill that promise. Lawrence then resolves to create a cure to make himself and Adrien mortal.
