= Ikaw ay Pag-Ibig =

2011 Philippine television series

- Genre: Christian drama Police procedural
- Created by: ABS-CBN Studios
- Written by: Cris Lim; Dindo Perez
- Directed by: Jerome C. Pobocan; Jojo A. Saguin; Erick C. Salud
- Starring: Zaijian Jaranilla; Mutya Orquia; Louise Abuel; Xyriel Manabat; Dimples Romana; Alfred Vargas; Mark Gil; Paulo Avelino; Bembol Roco; Yen Santos; Beverly Salviejo; Gerald Pesigan; Izzy Canillo; Pen Medina
- Opening theme: "Sapagkat ang Diyos ay Pag-ibig" by Erik Santos
- Country of origin: Philippines
- Original language: Filipino
- No. of episodes: 50 (list of episodes)

Production
- Executive producers: Roldeo T. Endrinal; Carlina Dela Merced
- Production locations: Rizal, Philippines; Metro Manila
- Editors: Froilan Francia; Jay Mendoza
- Running time: 30-45 minutes Monday-Friday; PHT, UTC+08:00
- Production company: Dreamscape Entertainment

Original release
- Network: ABS-CBN
- Release: November 21, 2011 – January 27, 2012

Related
- May Bukas Pa; Noah; FPJ's Ang Probinsyano

Ikaw ay Pag-Ibig (transl. you are the love) is a Philippine television drama series broadcast by ABS-CBN. Directed by Jerome C. Pobocan, Jojo A. Saguin, and Erick C. Salud. It stars Zaijian Jaranilla, Mutya Orquia, Louise Abuel, Xyriel Manabat, Dimples Romana, Alfred Vargas, Mark Gil, Paulo Avelino, Bembol Roco, Yen Santos, Beverly Salviejo, Gerald Pesigan, Izzy Canillo and Pen Medina. It aired on the network's Primetime Bida line up and worldwide on TFC from November 21, 2011 to January 27, 2012, replacing 100 Days to Heaven and was replaced by E-Boy.

== Premise ==
Nonoy, Angelica, Tinay, and Edison in an unforgettable story about the true meaning of Christmas. Although they were born poor, being raised by parents who dearly loved them not only made up for their lack of material things but also inspired courage and compassion among them. But the strength of their characters will be put to the test when their parents die in an accident. Left to fend for themselves, the four kids were forced to move on with their lives and celebrate Christmas even without their loved ones. What trials and adventures are in store for them?

== Cast and characters ==
=== Main cast ===
- Zaijian Jaranilla as Nonoy Garrido/Julius Reyes
- Mutya Orquia as Tinay
- Louise Abuel as Edison
- Xyriel Manabat as Angelica

=== Supporting cast ===
- Dimples Romana as Agnes Alvarez
- Alfred Vargas as Mario Reyes
- Mark Gil† as Congressman Leandro Alvarez
- Paulo Avelino as Andrew "Andoy" Jimenez
- Bembol Roco as Police Inspector (Lieutenant) Robert Jimenez
- Yen Santos as Police Inspector (Lieutenant) Michelle Alvarez
- Beverly Salviejo as Ising
- Gerald Pesigan as Obet
- Izzy Canillo as Jackstone
- Pen Medina as Angel Gabriel

=== Minor cast ===
Cast	Character	Summary
Smokey Manaloto	Francisco "Isko" Garrido	A jeepney driver, he is the husband of Caring and the foster father of Nonoy. On their way back to Manila, they found a baby in the side of the street. Seeing his wife happy carrying the child, he decided to adopt the baby. He died in a jeepney crash protecting his family.
Arlene Muhlach	Caring Garrido	Wife of a jeepney driver and the foster mother of Nonoy. She died in the jeepney crash while protecting Nonoy.
Jhong Hilario	Alex	A poor inventor and the father of Edison. He believed that if one has an opportunity to help others, they should do it, because it brings happiness. He died in the jeepney crash.
Danilo Barrios	Peter	A traffic vendor and the father of Tinay. He died when Rosario's car hit him.
Rica Peralejo	Rosario	She appears to be kind and loving. She is the human being guarded by Angelica and the key to the accident. Because Angelica failed to protect her, she died in the accident.
Isay Alvarez	Idang	Jackstone's biological mother.
Yogo Singh	Young Rafa / Young Jesus	He appeared to Nonoy in the end of the series. He guided Nonoy towards his true decision.

=== Guest cast ===
- John Lapus as Max
- Eula Valdez as Ms. Castro - former head of the orphanage. Arrested for child abuse.
- Malou de Guzman as Ima
- Noemi Oineza as Girl's caretaker
- Janus del Prado as Andrew's nemesis
- Igi Boy Flores as Boy's caretaker
- Joe Vargas as Bogs - Andrew's henchman
- Eslove Briones as Ryan - Andrew's henchman
- Quintin Alianza as Tambay Boy 1
- Philip Nolasco as Tambay Boy 2
- Basty Alcances as Voltron
- Archie Alemania as Mr. Daplan - House Hunter
- Tess Antonio as Realtor
- Mike Lloren as Leandro's bodyguard
- Yutaka Yamakawa as Police officer
- Fonz Deza as Police chief
- Jordan Hong as House buyer
- Tony Manalo as Ryan's father
- Ariel Rivera as Mang Arnel
- Carlos Agassi as Mr. Dizon
- Gladys Reyes as Mrs. Dizon
- Baron Geisler as Turko
- Niña Dolino as Newscaster/Reporter
- Allan Paule as Junior
- Kimberly Diaz as Isay
- Cherry Lou as Pidyong's wife
- Mark Joshua Sarayot as Young Junior
- Veyda Inoval as Young Isay
- Joonee Gamboa as Pidyong
- Justin Cuyugan as Young Pidyong
- Jaime Fabregas as Jonathan Lacerna
- Lollie Mara† as Mrs. Lacerna
- Susan Africa as Aida
- Empress Schuck as Nene
- Nonie Buencamino as Efren
- Ama Quiambao as Flora
- Jojit Lorenzo as Elvis
- Malou Crisologo as Elvis's wife
- Jayson Gainza as Val Garrido - one of the relatives of Nonoy's adoptive parents.
- Yayo Aguila as Marietta - Peter's cousin, also Tinay's aunt/first cousin once removed.
- Lorenzo Mara as Jerry - Marietta's husband and Tinay's uncle
- Mika dela Cruz as Stephanie - Marietta's daughter and Tinay's second cousin.
- Gio Alvarez as Mark - Edison's adoptive father
- Kalila Aguiluz as Mark's wife
- Anita Linda† as Max's mother
- Emilio Garcia as Syndicate Boss
- Maurice Mabutas as Young Michelle
- Nash Aguas as Young Andrew

== Episodes ==
Series overview
Season	Episodes	Originally released	
Season	Episodes	First released	Last released
2011	30	November 21, 2011	December 30, 2011
2012	20	January 2, 2012	January 20, 2012
Finale	20	January 23, 2012	January 27, 2012

== Promotion ==
This show has been developed by Mga Anghel na Walang Langit, Princess Sarah, May Bukas Pa, Agua Bendita, Momay, Noah, Mutya, 100 Days to Heaven, and Budoy due to genre of family and religious-oriented drama series where Dreamscape Entertainment released these types of series since 2005. It was succeeded by Honesto and Dahil sa Pag-ibig.

== Production ==
The series was announced on October 4, 2011 with the title Diyos ay Pag-ibig before changing to its final title Ikaw ay Pag-ibig. Taping or principal photography of the series was made from October 2011 to January 27, 2012. Overall, production process of the series which included its announcement spanned for three months.

== See also ==
- List of programs broadcast by ABS-CBN
- List of ABS-CBN Studios original drama series
