= List of 100 Days to Heaven episodes =

100 Days to Heaven is a 2011 Philippine fantasy comedy drama television series directed by Malu L. Sevilla, Jojo A. Saguin, and Don M. Cuaresma. The series stars Coney Reyes and Xyriel Manabat as Anna Manalastas, and Jodi Sta. Maria as Sophia Delgado and Trisha Manalastas, with an ensemble cast consisting of Joel Torre, Dominic Ochoa, Smokey Manaloto, Valerie Concepcion, Rafael Rosell, Jewel Mische, Emmanuelle Vera, Neil Coleta, Louise Abuel, Rustica Carpio, and Noel Trinidad in their supporting roles. The series originally aired on ABS-CBN's Primetime Bida evening block and worldwide on TFC from May 9 to November 18, 2011, with a total of 140 episodes, replacing Mutya.

== Series overview ==
Series	Episode	No. of episodes	First aired	Last aired	First aired (overall)	Last aired (overall)
2011	1– 133	133	May 9, 2011	November 9, 2011	May 9, 2011	November 18, 2011
2011	134– 140	7	November 10, 2011	November 18, 2011	May 9, 2011	November 18, 2011

== Episodes ==
=== 2011 ===
==== Episodes 1–133 ====
No. in series	Title	Original release date
1	"It Is Never Too Late to Change and Make the World a Better Place"	May 9, 2011
Anna grows up trying to make her strict father proud, leading her to become a cold-hearted, no-nonsense businesswoman. After going through a violent death, Anna gets sent back to Earth for a hundred days to rectify her mistakes and redeem her soul. Summary on YouTube: Anna Manalastas' sudden death changes her life in an instant as she meets the Gatekeeper who gave her 100 days to right her wrongs on Earth and be able to enter the gates of heaven.
2	"To Make Up for Her Cruelty, Anna Starts Her Life Over as a Child"	May 10, 2011
Anna finds help in a young boy named Kevin and his family who let her stay at their house. Meanwhile, the investigation on Anna's death continues and Bobby is one of the suspects. Summary on YouTube: To make up for her cruelty, Anna starts her life over as a child and meets Kevin who offers her to live with his small family.
3	"Anna is Exposed to Sofia and Her Family's Life"	May 11, 2011
Anna manages to convince Sophia that she is actually an adult trapped inside a child's body. After enlisting the young woman's help for her mission, Anna breaks into her own mansion. Summary on YouTube: Anna tries to convince Sophia about her true identity and win her trust.
4	"Anna Is on Her Toes in Finding Brando"	May 12, 2011
After escaping prison, a desperate Brando takes an entire hospital hostage--including Anna and Kevin's family. Brando then makes his demands and asks Anna and Kevin to come with him.
5	"Anna Must Stop Brandon from Doing Horrible Things"	May 13, 2011
Brando's ailing daughter finally undergoes surgery. As Brando opens up about his misfortunes when Anna fired him as her driver, the businesswoman tries to convince him to free his hostages.
6	"Anna Enjoys the Perks of Being a Child as She Lists Down the People She Needs to Make Amends with"	May 16, 2011
Bobby receives news about the suspect behind Anna's untimely demise. Sophia decides to stop helping Anna after a spat. The Gatekeeper appears before Anna once again.
7	"Kevin Continues to Worry about Anna"	May 17, 2011
As the Gatekeeper reminds her of her difficult mission, Anna reaches out to Sophia for help. Bobby finds out that Anna does not have any legal heirs.
8	"Anna's Apparent Heir, Jessica, Tries to Claim Her Inheritance"	May 18, 2011
Along with Sophia, Anna looks for the people she has wronged in the past. An unknown woman claiming to be Anna's legal heir throws Bobby and Miranda into a panic. Andres discovers the money that Anna has paid Sophia.
9	"Andres and Sophia Needs to Stand by Each Other to Overcome Their Family Problems"	May 19, 2011
Revealing Anna's true identity, Sophie gets forced to admit to Andres how she finances Kevin's medical needs. Bobby comes up with a plan to take the Toy Company’s ownership from Jessica. Jopet suggests a way to make Anna’s mission a bit easier.
10	"Anna Is Not Comfortable in Handing Over the Company to Jessica"	May 20, 2011
Wanting to prove his worth to Bobby, Bart uses his charms on Jessica. Learning of the shocking developments at her company, Anna devises a plan to gain access to her workplace while Sophia looks for Anna’s daughter.
11	"Anna Prepares Sophia for Her Upcoming Task as a Dilligent Executive in The Toy Company"	May 23, 2011
Anna grooms Sophia to be a marketing pro to help her accomplish her mission. Bart continues to stall Jessica by going out on a date with her. Andres approves Sophia and Anna's plan.
12	"Anna Targets Her Competitor's Singaporean Account"	May 24, 2011
Anna helps Sophia land a job as a marketing executive at the Villanuevas' toy company. Later, Anna recalls the rift she has caused between the Villanueva brothers.
13	"Sophia Urges Anna to Come Clean to the Villanueva Brothers"	May 25, 2011
Sophia comes up with a way to help Anna undo the rift she caused between the Villanueva brothers. After getting into trouble with the authorities, Yanie asks Bart not to inform Bobby of her return to the country.
14	"Anna Is Terrified After Her Actions in Saving the Villanueva Brothers Take a Wrong Turn"	May 26, 2011
Ana promises Mr. Villanueva that his wish will come true. She and Sophia then set up Jojo and Ruel to give them a chance to talk. However, the Villanueva brothers end up fighting.
15	"Anna and Sophia Put the Villanueva Brothers in a One of a Kind Sit Down to Resolve Their Issues"	May 27, 2011
Determined to reconcile Jojo and Ruel, Anna and her friends resort to desperate measures. Meanwhile, the Villanueva brothers' situation mirrors Bobby and Bart's problems.
16	"Anna Will Soon Be Able to Enter and Control Her Company Again"	May 30, 2011
Sophia crushes Bobby with her presentation for the Singaporean clients. Impressed, Bobby asks Bart to convince Sophia to work for their company, but the young woman insists on transacting directly with him.
17	"Sophia Is Having Trouble in Pretending as a Big Time Marketing Consultant"	May 31, 2011
Sophia agrees to work for Bobby only if Anna accompanies her in the office. Sophia begins her first day at the Toy Company and finds the politics of her new job emotionally draining.
18	"Bart Feels Incompetent After Bobby Compares Him to Sophia"	June 1, 2011
Bart becomes upset upon learning that his ideas need to go through Sophia first. Anna and Sophia try to find out who among her disgruntled former employees at the Toy Company appreciated her.
19	"Sophia Wants to Be a Legitimate Businesswoman"	June 2, 2011
With Anna's help, Sophia becomes more confident with her new role as the Toy Company's marketing consultant. Meanwhile, Carding recalls how his encounter with Anna has changed his life for the better.
20	"Sophia Rises to the Occasion and Disregards Bart's Humiliation Attempt"	June 3, 2011
Bart belittles Sophia's ability. Soon, Anna teaches her how to study people's behavior and act tough and smart at work. Jessica meets Sophia and Anna.
21	"Suspicion Arises as Anna and Sophia Go Deeper in Their Plan"	June 6, 2011
Andres tries to convince Sophia to stop working for the Toy Company. Bart, meanwhile, plans to get back at Sophia for embarrassing him in front of their staff.
22	"Andres Wants to Prove to Sophia That He Is Still the Head of Their Family"	June 7, 2011
Sophia and Anna find out that Carding is retiring soon. Following a big argument with her father, Sophia contemplates leaving her job as a marketing executive. Meanwhile, Yanie insinuates that Bart is starting to fall for Sophia.
23	"Sophia and Bart Are Forced to Team Up for an Office Project"	June 8, 2011
Remembering the sacrifices she made just to please her late father, Anna convinces Andres to let Sophia pursue her dreams. After helping Carding secure his long-overdue promotion, Sophia considers the thought of resigning from the Toy Company.
24	"Bart's Moves Seem to Affect Sophia a Lot"	June 9, 2011
Sophia's inconsistencies fuel Bart's suspicions regarding her true identity. The Gatekeeper reminds Anna that she has 80 days left to fulfill her mission. Meanwhile, Kevin stumbles upon a homeless young woman in the park.
25	"Time for Anna to Make It Up for Her Former Employee, Gina"	June 10, 2011
Anna recognizes Gina behind the grime and rags. After giving Gina a bath, Anna and Sophia try various tactics to bring back the former’s sanity. Meanwhile, Bart continues his obsessive inquiry into Sophia's character.
26	"Anna Must Find a Way to Make Gina Recall Why She Became So Disoriented"	June 13, 2011
Together with Sophia, Anna continues to help Gina regain her memory upon learning of the latter's sufferings at her hands. Bart gets arrested for trespassing into a stranger's house.
27	"Is There Still Hope for Paul and Gina?"	June 14, 2011
Andres gives Sophia and Anna an advice that could help them solve Paul and Gina's problem. As Jessica gets upset with him, Bart attempts to mend their relationship.
28	"A Happy Ending for Paul and Gina Will Bring Anna Closer to Heaven"	June 15, 2011
Bart belittles Sophia's ability. Soon, Anna teaches her how to study people's behavior and act tough and smart at work. Jessica meets Sophia and Anna.
29	"Anna Trembles in the Thought of Leaving Her Company to Bobby"	June 16, 2011
Sophia promises to save Jessica from Bart's malicious intent. Strange occurrence at The Toy Company convinces its employees that Anna's spirit is haunting them.
30	"A False Rumor Degrades the Toy Company's Reputation"	June 17, 2011
Rumors about Anna's restless spirit spread like wildfire, causing the public to feel deeply disturbed. Meanwhile, Jopet and Anna talk about life and death.
31	"Is the Ghost Really a Part of Anna's Past?"	June 20, 2011
Anna and Sophia try to resolve the problem on the spiritual entity who continues to haunt the Toy Company. Soon, they discover that the alleged black lady was once a victim of Anna Manalastas' cruelty.
32	"Meet Emerald Capistrano, a Real Ghost from Anna's Past"	June 21, 2011
The so-called black lady introduces herself as Emerald Capistrano, a special effects artist whose father, Julio, was shortchanged by Anna. The former CEO, meanwhile, denies doing anything wrong against Emerald and Julio.
33	"After Learning the Real Reason Behind Her Ghostly Antics, Sophia Tries to Save Emerald from Bobby"	June 22, 2011
Sophia tries to convince Anna that she is partly responsible for the misfortunes of Emerald and her father. She then asks Bobby to let the woman off the hook.
34	"Miranda Notices Sophia's Alarming Absence in the Midst of The Toy Company's Challenging Times"	June 23, 2011
Anna turns Kevin's idea of forgiveness into a brilliant marketing scheme to get Emerald out of prison and save Toy Company's reputation. Sophia impresses the board members with a plan that will surely save the company's image.
35	"Will Sophia's Threat to Leave the Company Work on the Executives?"	June 24, 2011
With the so-called “Sophia Magic” posing a threat to the Toy Company’s boss, Anna uses her cunning to turn the tide in her favor. Bart is left in disbelief when his true feelings for Sophia manifests out of the blue.
36	"Sophia Joins Jessica in a Girls Night Out to Look Into Her Deeper Motives"	June 27, 2011
Anna comes across an old flame. Worried about Jessica after learning of her undying love for Bart, Yanie advises Bart to take his relationship with the heiress seriously.
37	"Anna Is Completely Bothered at the Sight of Her Ex"	June 28, 2011
Kevin gets rushed to the hospital after suffering from another heart attack. Soon, Anna and Sophia meet Rene's wife and discover that Rene returns home to tie up some loose ends.
38	"Madame Anna Needs to Know Why Rene Left Her Behind"	June 29, 2011
Sophia tries to convince Anna to consider forgiving Rene for his past transgressions. Bruce pretends to be a private investigator and divulges some information about Rene's daughter.
39	"Rene's Guilt and Excitement to See Tricia Gets the Best of Him"	June 30, 2011
Despite Sophia's help to find his love child, Rene remains haunted by his past wrongdoings against Anna as he seeks forgiveness of the daughter he has never met.
40	"Sophia and Anna Come Closer in Finding Tricia"	July 1, 2011
After finally forgiving Rene, Anna decides to get to know the child she had given away to a woman named Digna. Meanwhile, Andres fears the consequence of Sophia finding out the truth.
41	"Bobby Loses Confidence in Himself After His Ways Are Questioned by Miranda"	July 4, 2011
Bobby and Miranda begin to become intimidated by Sophia's strong influence on The Toy Company. Meanwhile, Anna notices that Bart has feelings for Sophia.
42	"Miranda Digs Deep to Bring Down Sophia"	July 5, 2011
Miranda continues to dig some dirt on Sophia in a bid to get her fired. Meanwhile, Anna recalls how she ruined the business of an innocent flower vendor.
43	"While Anna and Sophia Are Busy Dealing with Myrna, Bobby Is Pressured with More Work Due to the Absence of the Latter"	July 6, 2011
After Myrna recalls how the failure of her business caused her to become separated from her children, Anna and Sophia decide to help her get back on her feet.
44	"Anna and Sophia Must Cover Their Tracks If They Don't Want Miranda to Bust Their Real Mission"	July 7, 2011
Anna and Sophia learn that helping Myrna get her children back is not as easy as they hoped it would be. Anna hits back at Miranda's scheme to investigate Sophia.
45	"Will Tagabantay Extend Anna's Stay on Earth?"	July 8, 2011
In their mission to retrieve Myrna's son, Sophia makes Anna angry by bringing up the topic of her own daughter. Jessica asserts her claim over the company to Bobby.
46	"Anna and Sophia Realize How Difficult Mothering Is Through Myrna"	July 11, 2011
Myrna finds out that Claire is upset with her. Anna tries to convince Claire that Myrna still has their best interests at heart despite being separated from her and her siblings. Jessica tries to exercise her authority in the Toy Company.
47	"A Mother Like Myrna Doesn't Give Up Easily on Her Children"	July 12, 2011
Myrna and Claire patch things up. Miranda and Bobby continue to plot against Jessica and Sophia. Meanwhile, Sophia suggests telling Myrna why Anna is helping her.
48	"Myrna Kidnaps Her Own Daughter from Her Adoptive Parents"	July 13, 2011
A desperate Myrna resorts to doing something underhanded upon learning that Margaret's adoptive parents do not want to honor their past agreement. Yanie and Bart notice that Bobby is insecure about Sophia's talent.
49	"Will Sophia Be Able to Keep Up with Her Commitments in the Office?"	July 14, 2011
As Myrna's case comes to a close, Sophia faces another challenge in the office against Bobby. Despite not getting Margaret's custody, Myrna receives a heartwarming present from her daughter.
50	"Anna Tells Myrna Who Really Is Responsible for Her Suffering"	July 15, 2011
After confessing her offense to Myrna, Anna agrees on a deal with Sophia regarding her daughter. Bobby and Miranda devise a surefire way to sever the ties between Jessica and Sophia.
51	"Anna Thinks of the Best Way on How to Approach Her Long Lost Daughter"	July 18, 2011
Bart belittles Sophia's ability. Soon, Anna teaches her how to study people's behavior and act tough and smart at work. Jessica meets Sophia and Anna.
52	"Anna Gather's Enough Courage to Talk to Rachelle"	July 19, 2011
Bart belittles Sophia's ability. Soon, Anna teaches her how to study people's behavior and act tough and smart at work. Jessica meets Sophia and Anna.
53	"Anna Feels That She Had Enough Share of Looking for Her Daughter"	July 20, 2011
After realizing that Rachel is not her real daughter, Anna transfers her multi-million savings to Sophia's bank account. Meanwhile, Sophia and Bart are about to work closely together for a company project.
54	"Kevin and Anna Get to Meet New Friends"	July 21, 2011
Finding herself volunteering for a magic act, Anna meets another person whom she must put on her mission list. Later, the clown Pido invites Anna, Sophia, and Kevin into his home.
55	"Pido Tries to Regain His Dignity with Anna's Help"	July 22, 2011
A close-up look at Pido's life makes Anna regret dismissing him from work and pushes her to help him stand up on his own once more. Soon after, Anna and Sophia encourage Pido to dream again.
56	"Anna Encourages Pido to Find a Job"	July 25, 2011
In hopes of giving his siblings a better life, Pido undergoes training with Anna to land his dream job. However, Pido easily feels discouraged as he gets rejected in job applications. Later, a misunderstanding ensues between him and his siblings.
57	"Now That Anna and the Gang Reunited Pido and His Siblings, All That's Left Is for Him Get Back on His Own Feet"	July 26, 2011
After his recent misfortunes, Pido decides to give up on life. Thankfully, Anna and Sophia find a way to help him get his life back on track. Meanwhile, Anna tells Jopet to stay away from Yanie.
58	"Bart and Sophia Are Now Completely in Good Terms"	July 27, 2011
Sophia's feelings for Bart start to grow stronger. Meanwhile, Anna finally locates August's whereabouts. In order to learn more about the hairdresser, Anna enlists Bruce and Jopet’s help.
59	"Sophia Realizes How Damaged August Is Because of Anna"	July 28, 2011
Hoping to discover her transgressions and make it up to the ill-humored August, Anna gets a haircut from him. Meanwhile, Bobby forces Sophia and Bart to work together.
60	"Sophia Makes August Realize That Emulating Anna Won't Do Her Any Good"	July 29, 2011
Anna finds herself in a tight spot as Sophia’s blossoming feelings for Bart start to get in the way of their mission. To make matters worse, Anna finds August's case difficult for her to resolve.
61	"Is Anna's Mission Really Over?"	August 1, 2011
Sophia makes August understand his faults, until his pride takes the better of him. Worried for the hairdresser, Anna soon realizes how bad she used to be.
62	"Anna Grows as a More Loving and Appreciative Person, But Will It Be Too Late?"	August 2, 2011
Sophia and Anna celebrate on a pact they made about dealing with their personal relationships. When an accident comes in the way, Anna receives an ultimatum from St. Peter.
63	"Sophia Faces Her Colleagues Without Anna for the First Time"	August 3, 2011
With Anna still in coma, Sophia is left vulnerable to the schemes of Bobby and Miranda. Anna begs St. Peter to let her return to Sophia when her sincerity fails to convince the gatekeeper.
64	"Anna's Accident Makes Sophia Realize How Important She Is in Her Life"	August 4, 2011
While Anna recuperates from the accident, Sophia gets fired from the Toy Company. Fortunately, Anna comes up with a plan that leaves Bobby with no choice but to rehire Sophia.
65	"To Bobby's Great Dismay, Sophia Refuses to Help with the Company's Problem"	August 5, 2011
Sophia sends Bobby on his knees in a successful way to get even with him. Meanwhile, Anna sees another mission in an electrician working in their building.
66	"Lando Wants to Be on the Good Side of His Son"	August 8, 2011
Facing another challenge in her mission, Anna takes it upon herself to reconcile Ronaldo and Regie by offering the regretful father a helping hand. Ronaldo accepts Anna's help but with a condition.
67	"Our Mission Duo Tells Ronaldo Their Plans on How to Win His Son Back"	August 9, 2011
Bobby flies into a fit of rage upon losing control over the company. Anna and Sophia carry out their plans to reconcile Ronaldo and Regie. Meanwhile, Kevin finds a new friend.
68	"Anna's Plans Seem to Worsen Ronaldo and Reggie's Relationship"	August 10, 2011
Bart's sudden absences drive Bobby up the wall and arouse Jessica's suspicions. Anna and Sophia learn the secret behind Ronaldo's story, prompting them to confront him about the truth.
69	"Kevin Believes That Bart Is Good Enough to Be Friends with His Sister"	August 11, 2011
Regie learns the truth about his father. Miranda uses Jessica and Bart's rift as an opportunity to discredit Sophia. Soon, Anna discovers the identity of Kevin's new friend.
70	"Andres Carefully Plans Out How to Tell Sophia the Truth about Her Real Parents"	August 12, 2011
Sophia's sacrifices for Anna push Andres to partake in a mission for his daughter. After confiding to Yanie his true feelings, Bart gets forced to do something against his will. A mysterious phone call bothers Miranda.
71	"Anna and Kevin Stumbles Into a Major Problem While Looking for Girlie"	August 15, 2011
Bart is torn between his love for Sophia and his obligation to his family. Meanwhile, Anna and Kevin get involved in a crime due to mistaken identity.
72	"Kevin Moves Anna's Heart When He Suggested to Help Eloy"	August 16, 2011
Eloy confides his story to Anna and Kevin. Soon, Anna finds herself helping out the person who kidnapped her and Kevin. Meanwhile, Minerva answers a mysterious phone call.
73	"Anna Tells Eloy That There Are Things in Life That You Just Have to Accept"	August 17, 2011
Kevin does his share of helping Anna with her mission. Meanwhile, Eloy and Miranda straighten their issues out. Elsewhere, Bart voices out his true feelings to Bobby.
74	"Bart Comes to Kevin's Aid After He Blacks Out"	August 18, 2011
Bart inevitably finds out about Kevin's connection to Sophia. Meanwhile, Anna asks Kevin to keep another secret. Elsewhere, Bobby receives news that is fatal to his plans.
75	"Anna and Sophia Meets Tikoy, the Key to Her Next Cause"	August 19, 2011
Sophia and Anna's search for Girlie leads them to another mission in the person of Tikoy. Bart's problem with Jessica gets resolved, but not in the way he wanted.
76	"Anna Helps Tikoy to Let Go of His Lola"	August 22, 2011
Completing her mission aside, Anna faces the difficulty of telling Tikoy the bad news about his grandmother. Anna and Sophia discuss Tikoy's future and find a resolution for Diana's proposal. Summary on YouTube: Anna helps Tikoy to let go of Lola Pilar.
77	"Diana Does Her Best to Be Tikoy's Mom"	August 23, 2011
Just as when Anna is about to cross out grandmother's name in her mission list, a new problem with Tikoy arises. Soon, Anna proposes an uncanny solution to Tikoy's predicament.
78	"Miranda Is Very Worried with Her Dark Secret"	August 24, 2011
As Bobby and the police find a new lead, Anna's murder case gets the possibility of being reinvestigated again. Anna offers her advice to Sophia on avoiding Bart.
79	"Anna Considers Knowing Who Killed Her a Part of Her Mission"	August 25, 2011
The news about the reopening of the murder case reaches Anna. Bobby finds himself among the list of suspects in Anna's case, making him look back on the beginnings of his career with her.
80	"Why Does Miranda Hate Anna?"	August 26, 2011
Miranda looks back to the beginnings of her story with Bart, the Toy Company, and Anna as her evil deed gets revealed. Meanwhile, Bart tells Jessica what she needs to know.
81	"Bart Breaks Up with Jessica and Follows His Heart"	August 29, 2011
Bart finally summons his courage to do the right thing for love. In a fit of rage, Jessica vows to exact revenge on Sophia. Worried about Sophia and her love problems, Anna promises to protect the young lady.
82	"Madam Anna Hits Two Birds with One Stone as She Takes Sophia and the Gang to a Resort"	August 30, 2011
Bart looks for Sophia’s residence. Unknown to him, Anna brings Sophia and her cousins to a resort where her next mission is. Anna soon learns about Girlie’s predicament, but it is the latter who refuses to leave the work that is making her suffer.
83	"Jessica Warns Bart That She Will Bring Him Trouble"	August 31, 2011
Anna and Sophia cannot help but pry when Girlie continuously becomes blinded by her love for Dexter. Meanwhile, Bart patiently waits for Sophia in front of her house.
84	"Dexter Manipulates Girlie Again"	September 1, 2011
Anna's mission with Girlie brings up Sophia's own unwanted problems relating to Bart. As Girlie follows Anna’s advice, Kevin shares his thoughts with Dexter.
85	"Girlie Follows Anna and Sophia's Advice"	September 2, 2011
Anna asks for Girlie’s forgiveness. Bart's persistent wait finally pays off. Anna's concern for Sophia leads to the discovery of Andres' long kept secret.
86	"Will Anna Tell Sophia That She's Adopted?"	September 5, 2011
Bart and Sophia brim with joy as they finally admit their true feelings for each other. Keeping her word, Anna starts looking for Sophia's real parents.
87	"Digna Must Find the True Heir of the Toy Company"	September 6, 2011
Anna enlists Bruce and Jopet's help in finding Sophia's real parents. Meanwhile, St. Peter pretends as a female chef to remind Anna about her mission.
88	"Anna Is Surprised to See Digna"	September 7, 2011
Anna finds herself between a rock and a hard place. An untoward incident befalls Digna following her arrival at the Toy Company in a bid to reveal Anna's real inheritor to Bobby.
89	"Anna Discovers Who Her Real Daughter Is"	September 8, 2011
Anna is taken aback upon finding out the identity of her real daughter. As Miranda begins an investigation about her life, Anna arrives at a decision.
90	"Anna Decided to Keep Her Latest Discovery from Sophia"	September 9, 2011
Despite their earlier disagreement, Anna helps Sophia prepare for her date with Bart. Later, she eludes with Digna from the hospital to check in on the couple.
91	"Bobby and Miranda Are Still Freaking Out at the Possibility That Anna Has a Legal Heir"	September 12, 2011
Bobby and Miranda learn about Anna’s daughter. Anna vows to give Sophia all of her assets as her rightful heir. Soon, Sophia gets forced to confess the truth to Bart.
92	"Is Bart and Sophia's Separation for the Best?"	September 13, 2011
Sophia tries to mend fences with Bart, unaware that Bobby finally finds out about their relationship and grows livid. Soon, Bobby receives a message from Anna.
93	"How Can Anna Stop Bobby from Becoming a Tyrant?"	September 14, 2011
Anna enlists Bruce and Jopet's help to talk to Bobby. Noticing Anna's strange behavior, Sophia and Bruce decide to reach out to a police officer for assistance in finding Anna's daughter.
94	"A Cop Who Will Help Anna Finish Her Mission"	September 15, 2011
Miranda seeks Gen. Salazar’s help to find Anna’s daughter. Jessica returns and takes over Toy Company. Soon, Sophia and Bruce receive a new lead about their search from Jack. Summary on YouTube: John Lloyd Cruz portrays a cop who will help Anna finish her mission.
95	"Jack Comes Closer in Unveiling Anna's Secret"	September 16, 2011
Anna convinces Sophia to call off the investigation just when Jack comes upon a shocking discovery about her daughter. After squeezing the truth out of Anna, Jack threatens to expose her secret.
96	"Will Bobby and Miranda Finally Discover the Identity of the True Heir of The Toy Company?"	September 19, 2011
Anna's anxiety reaches high levels as Jack reports the results of his investigation on her true heir. Jack voices out his pent-up feelings about his relationship with his father. Summary on YouTube: Will Bobby and Miranda finally discover the identity of The Toy Company's true heir?
97	"Sophia Is Shocked to See Bart and Jessica Together"	September 20, 2011
Despite the failure to find Anna's heir, Bobby and Miranda succeed in laying out the path for Sophia's downfall. Yanie offers a helping hand to Bart's love problems.
98	"Sophia Must Face the Horrors in Her Office"	September 21, 2011
Sophia's weak state due to her breakup with Bart opens an opportunity for Jessica and Bobby to take her down. Bart, meanwhile, puts himself in harm's way.
99	"Bobby, Miranda and Jessica Continue to Torture Sophia in the Office"	September 22, 2011
The humiliation that Sophia experienced during the board meeting propels her to seek Anna's guidance for revenge. Bobby is persistent in pushing Bart toward Jessica.
100	"What Is Anna's Big Plan to Keep Sophia's Job?"	September 23, 2011
Teddy learns about the things his uncle has been doing behind his back. He asks for Sophia's assistance to prevent his company from falling in exchange for his participation in whatever she wants.
101	"Will Teddy and His Uncle Resolve Their Issues"	September 26, 2011
Walter influences the board to replace Teddy from his post as CEO. With the help of Sophia and Anna, Bruce sneaks into Walter's office to obtain the documents that could save Teddy's reputation.
102	"Tagabantay Comforts Anna"	September 27, 2011
Jessica's confidence in her position as Toy Company's owner shatters upon learning of Anna's greatest secret. While Jessica mulls over her new problem, Anna focuses on training Sophia. Summary on YouTube: Jericho Rosales comforts Anna.
103	"Andres Returns from His Trip"	September 28, 2011
Sophia's campaign serves as the last draw to Bobby. Andres's return surprises everyone, especially Anna, prompting her to confront him about their shared secret.
104	"Bart Is Very Suspicious of Anna's Involvement in Sophia's Life"	September 29, 2011
Anna's revelation bewilders Andres and puts him in a tight spot. Kevin's illness attacks once again, this time opening the possibility of exposing Anna's secret.
105	"Sophia Comes Closer to the Truth"	September 30, 2011
Sophia finally learns the truth about herself, and Anna is pressed to fill in the rest of the details. Jessica deters Bobby and Miranda's plans to bring Sophia down.
106	"Bobby and Jessica Freaks Out When Sophia Confronts Them about Anna's True Heir"	October 3, 2011
Sophia is forced to put her personal problems aside to respond to an office commotion caused by Bobby. Because of this, Anna offers her another training course.
107	"Sophia Seems to Channel All Her Inner Anger to Bobby"	October 4, 2011
Sophia succeeds in putting Bobby, Miranda, and Jessica at her mercy. Finding his adopted daughter's newfound values unacceptable, Andres gives Sophia his final reminder.
108	"Andres Is Not Happy with Sophia's Newfound Attitude"	October 5, 2011
A serious argument breaks out between Andres and Sophia. While his rival goes through a painful period in her life, Bobby's hatred for Sophia turns to a dangerous fixation.
109	"Will Sophia Realize Her Mistakes and Change for the Better?"	October 6, 2011
Anna tries her best to get Sophia out of her predicament, unaware that Bobby is refusing to let the latter off the hook easily. Bart proves himself undeserving of the prejudice against him.
110	"How Can Claire Help Sophia?"	October 7, 2011
Anna finally decides on telling Sophia the truth, while Sophia makes a newfound friend in prison. Bobby further widens the gap between him and his siblings.
111	"How Long Can Anna Keep the Truth from Bart?"	October 10, 2011
Bart learns the truth about Anna. Jessica's ignorance draws her closer to her downfall. Sophia helps Claire express her feelings to her mother, but grave news reaches the young girl.
112	"Bobby Can't Believe That Bart Would Rather Help Sophia Than Him"	October 11, 2011
Anna's last will sends Bobby into panic and pushes him to do desperate ways to get it out of his way. Kevin teases Sophia with a surprise on the day of her freedom.
113	"Kevin Gets Into a Horrible Accident"	October 12, 2011
Kevin helps Anna prepare for her revelation to Sophia. However, an accident puts Kevin's life in danger. Kevin needs heart surgery, but the only specialist who can help him refuses to do it.
114	"A Doctor Tries to Save Kevin's Life"	October 13, 2011
Dr. Ivan finally agrees to perform surgery on Kevin. Hopes are renewed as the chances of Kevin's survival increase. With Kevin's life on the line, Anna begs for a miracle.
115	"With Kevin, Anna Must Definitely Tell Sophia Her Greatest Secret"	October 14, 2011
Kevin's family and loved ones pick up the pieces and try to move on with their lives. Andres implores Anna not to waste Kevin's efforts. Anna looks back on her friendship with Kevin.
116	"Anna Tells Sophia That She Is Her Daughter"	October 17, 2011
Beginning to see red, Bobby's hatred for Sophia goes to a boiling point. Worrying about Sophia’s health, Anna finally summons the courage to tell the truth.
117	"Sophia Is Very Confused and Full of Anger After Hearing the Truth from Anna"	October 18, 2011
Sophia's reaction to the confession is worse than what Anna expected. Seeing how the revelation created a wide rift between the two women, Andres gives his advice to the troubled hearts of Anna and Sophia.
118	"Can Anna and Sophia Ever Regain Their Good Relationship?"	October 19, 2011
Atty. Leo takes matters in his own hands to find Anna's real heir. Bart, on the other hand, finally learns about Sophia's real identity and resolves to tell Yanie everything he knows.
119	"Bobby, Miranda and Jessica Will Do Whatever It Takes to Get Money and Power"	October 20, 2011
Anna goes to Atty. Leo's press conference in a bid to stop him from exposing her last will and testament. She then tries her best to prove herself to the skeptical lawyer.
120	"Anna Must Be in Good Terms with Her Mother Before She Saves Her Relationship with Sophia"	October 21, 2011
Despite doing everything he can, Atty. Leo fails in convincing Sophia to accept Anna's last will. Anna, on the other hand, double-crosses Miranda once more.
121	"Anna Must Start to Look for Her Mother"	October 24, 2011
Anna realizes that the only solution to her predicament is to reconcile with her past through meeting her mother. Meanwhile, Bart points out to Sophia the advantages of forgiving Anna.
122	"Anna Confronts Her Mom about Their Past"	October 25, 2011
After learning distressing news about her mother, Anna finally meets her and gets a chance to settle unresolved issues. Meanwhile, Bobby suspects that Atty. Leo already knows who Anna's heiress is.
123	"Anna Makes a Bold Move Before Bobby Finds Out the Truth about Tricia"	October 26, 2011
After learning distressing news about her mother, Anna finally meets her and gets a chance to settle unresolved issues. Meanwhile, Bobby suspects that Atty. Leo already knows who Anna's heiress is.
124	"Sophia Is Very Vulnerable in Swaying to Bobby's Dirty Tactics"	October 27, 2011
Anna successfully settles all her legal documents and turns over her wealth to Sophia. Now that Bobby already knows the truth, Anna fears for her daughter's safety.
125	"Bobby and Miranda Seem to Be Winning the Battle for Ownership of The Toy Company"	October 28, 2011
Sophia's continuing estrangement from Anna provides a favorable turn of events for Bobby and Miranda. Later, Jessica arrives at the office, unaware that a big surprise from Bobby is waiting for her.
126	"Jessica Goes Crazy After Losing the Company"	October 31, 2011
Jessica vows revenge after being utterly humiliated at the company she once owned. Bobby seizes the opportunity to feed his greatest ambitions, not realizing that the most important people in his life are beginning to fall from his reach. Summary on YouTube:Jessica goes crazy after losing The Toy Company.
127	"Anna Comes Up with the Best Way to Reach Out to Her Daughter"	November 1, 2011
Adamant in bridging the rift between her and Sophia, Anna comes up with a way to gain her daughter’s forgiveness. Bart and Yanie come up with a solution to stop Bobby from ruining Toy Company. Summary on YouTube:Anna finds a way to reach out to Sophia.
128	"Anna and Sophia Call a Truce to Dwell on Bigger Problems"	November 2, 2011
Hearing about the things happening at the Toy Company, Sophia agrees to team up with Anna against their common enemy. Meanwhile, Bobby’s unjust actions begin to take a toll on him.
129	"Anna and Sophia Team Up to Save the Toy Company and Its Workers"	November 3, 2011
Asking Andres for advice, Sophia realizes the only person she needs to forgive. On the other hand, Anna unknowingly catches Bobby and Miranda's attention.
130	"Bobby and Miranda Wants to Know Little Anna's Secret"	November 4, 2011
Unexpected guests arrive to add a more problem to the issues Anna and Sophia are trying to solve. As Sophia returns to her old ways, Jessica discovers a vital information.
131	"Baldo Proves His Worth to Miranda"	November 7, 2011
Baldo goes way out of Miranda's control and puts Anna in danger. Using all his connections to look for Anna, Bruce along with his cousins attempt to rescue their friend.
132	"Bruce Holds on to His Dear Life After Saving Anna"	November 8, 2011
Anna and Sophia once again lose one of the most important people in their lives. While Bobby suspects Miranda's connection to Baldo, Jessica tries to take advantage of Miranda's plight.
133	"Sophia Seeks Justice For Bruce"	November 9, 2011
The most unlikely person appears to offer her help to Anna and Sophia. While Bruce's loved ones mourn his untimely death, Miranda considers selling the company to Bobby.

==== Episodes 134–140 ====
No. in series	Title	Original release date
134	"Anna Gets the Truth Out of Baldo"	November 10, 2011
Anna discovers a way for Baldo to admit his crimes, leading him to reveal the person behind the businesswoman's murder. Sophia and Anna finally have a chance to talk calmly to each other.
135	"Will Bobby and Miranda Face or Run Away from the Law?"	November 11, 2011
After failing to gain Miranda's trust, Bobby reconciles with his siblings. He then gets the opportunity to correct his errors and settle his issues with Madame Anna herself.
Episodes 136–140 - 100 Days to Heaven: A Heavenly Finale and Ang Huling Linggo ni Anna Manalastas (The Last Week)
136	"Sophia Accepts the Ownership of the Toy Company"	November 14, 2011
Bobby has a change of heart and decides to give back the Toy Company to a reluctant Sophia. Meanwhile, the manhunt for Miranda continues.
137	"Miranda Loses All Her Morals After Bobby's Mishap"	November 15, 2011
Allowing her anger to consume her, Miranda refuses to open her heart to forgiveness. Meanwhile, Anna welcomes her last day on earth with mixed feelings.
138	"Sophia Falls Into Miranda's Wrath"	November 16, 2011
Anna learns that she is not yet qualified to go to heaven. She later finds herself in a quandary as she is forced to choose between Sophia and her last mission on earth.
139	"Anna Does All She Can to Save Sophia from Miranda"	November 17, 2011
Anna’s cunning saves Sophia from harm, but her mother Amelita breathes her last. The last grains of sand in Anna's hourglass falls, and the Reaper appears to fetch Anna's soul from earth.
140	"Anna Proves How Worthy She Is to Enter the Gates of Heaven"	November 18, 2011
To prevent further bloodshed, Anna decides to stop resisting her destiny and readily goes to Hell with the Reaper. Back on Earth, the Gatekeeper consoles Sophia as she laments her mother's sad fate until a timely message from Heaven arrives.
