= Mutia =

Mutia may refer to:

- Mutia (gens), a rather obscure plebeian family in Ancient Rome

Places and jurisdictions

- Mutia, Africa, an Ancient city and former bishopric in the Roman Byzacena province, now in Tunisia and a Latin Catholic titular see
- Mutia, Zamboanga del Norte, a fifth class municipality in the province of Zamboanga del Norte on Mindanao island, Philippines

== See also ==
- Mutya (disambiguation)
