= The Promise of Forever =

2017 Philippine television romantic fantasy drama series

- Title card
- Genre: Drama; Romance; Fantasy
- Created by: Reggie Amigo
- Written by: Mariami Tanangco-Domingo; Clarissa Estuar
- Directed by: Darnel Joy R. Villaflor; Hannah Espia; Jon S. Villarin
- Creative director: Johnny delos Santos
- Starring: Paulo Avelino; Ritz Azul; Ejay Falcon
- Opening theme: "Hanggang May Kailanman" by Angeline Quinto
- Composer: Carol Banawa
- Country of origin: Philippines
- Original language: Filipino
- No. of episodes: 55 (list of episodes)

Production
- Executive producers: Carlo Katigbak; Cory Vidanes; Laurenti Dyogi; Roldeo Endrinal
- Producers: Ethel Manaloto-Espiritu; Mae Santos; Rosselle Soldao-Gannaban
- Production locations: Philippines; Prague, Czech Republic; Bruges, Belgium; Amsterdam, Netherlands; Kraków, Poland
- Editor: Emerson Torres
- Running time: 45 minutes
- Production company: Dreamscape Entertainment Television

Original release
- Network: ABS-CBN
- Release: September 11 – November 24, 2017

The Promise of Forever is a 2017 Philippine television drama series broadcast by ABS-CBN. Directed by Darnel Joy R. Villaflor, Hannah Espia and Jon S. Villarin, it stars Paulo Avelino, Ritz Azul and Ejay Falcon. It aired on the network's Kapamilya Gold line up and worldwide on TFC from September 11 to November 24, 2017.

The series is streaming online on YouTube.

== Cast and characters ==
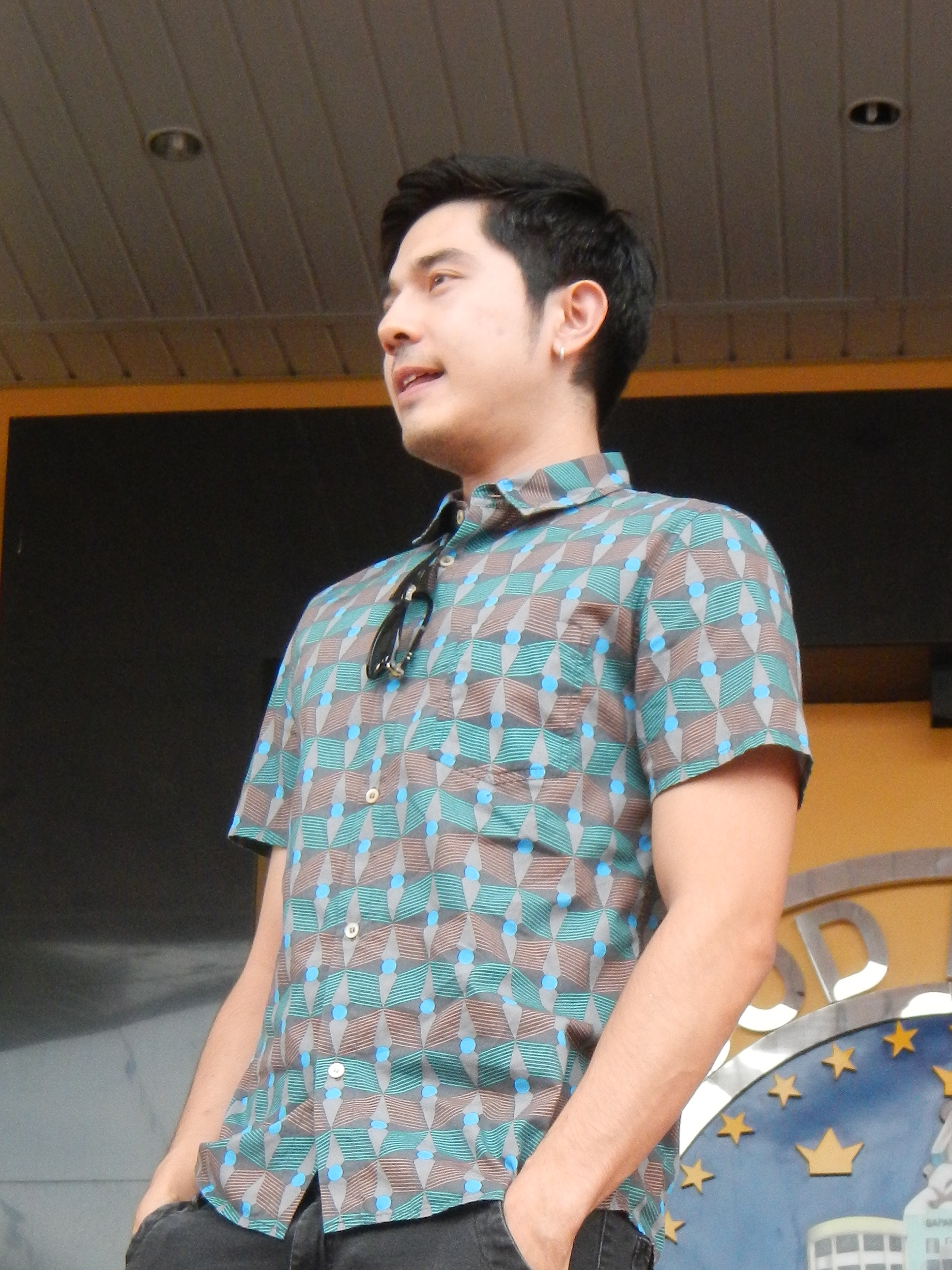
Paulo Avelino portrays the "immortal man".

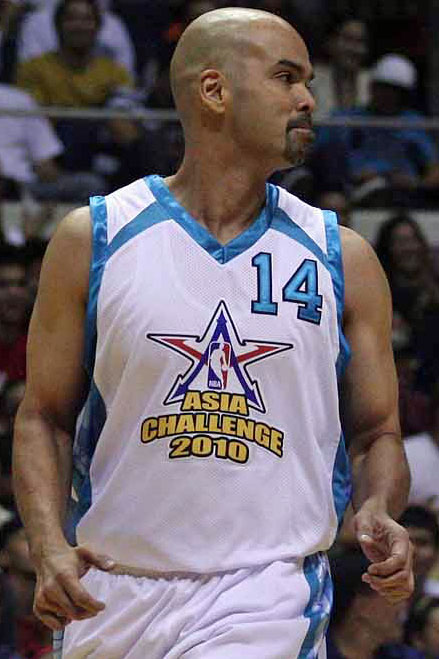
Benjie Paras portrays Geoffrey Madrid.

=== Main cast ===
- Paulo Avelino as Lorenzo Espinosa / Ramon Nolasco / Victor Gonzales / Emilio "Emil" Mendoza / Nicolas Barrientos / Lawrence Molina
- Ritz Azul as Sophia Madrid
- Ejay Falcon as Philip Ortega

=== Supporting cast ===
- Cherry Pie Picache as Vivienne Zialcita-Madrid
- Amy Austria-Ventura as Olivia Ortega-Borja
- Tonton Gutierrez as Marlon Borja
- Benjie Paras as Geoffrey Madrid
- Susan Africa as Janet Trinidad / Helen Reyes
- Eva Darren as Lola Faye Zialcita
- Nico Antonio as Chester Trinidad / Benjamin "Bing" Reyes / Matthew Santos
- David Chua as Michael Borja
- Khaine dela Cruz as Adrien Espinosa
- Princess Punzalan as Marcela dela Paz

=== Guest cast ===
- Mutya Orquia as young Sophia Madrid
- Lance Lucido as young Philip Ortega
- Sarah Lahbati as Elizabeth Dela Paz
- Desiree del Valle as Grace Madrid
- Ahron Villena as Fredrick Borja
- Levi Ignacio as William Borja

=== Special finale participation ===
- Anjo Damiles as adult Adrien Espinosa

== Production ==
Filming for The Promise of Forever began in May 2016, with majority of the scenes were shot in Eastern and Western European countries; it was also the first Philippine drama to be filmed in the Czech Republic. The series was fully pre-produced, filmed more than a year before airing, with a total of less than 13 weeks of airing were confirmed.

=== Timeslot ===
In the first media announcement of upcoming telenovela Victims of Love (now known as Asintado) on March 15, 2017, Paulo Avelino mentioned that The Promise of Forever will premiere in summer season. It was originally supposed to replace the Korean drama Love in the Moonlight on a late evening timeslot, but was postponed by the management due to requests and appeals by the Koreanovela fans.

After the long delay, The Promise of Forever finally premiered on September 11, 2017, but became part of the Kapamilya Gold afternoon block, replacing The Better Half. The drama switched places with The Good Son which is now moved to Primetime Bida block.

== Reception ==
Kantar Media National TV Ratings (4:15PM PST)
Pilot Episode	Finale Episode	Peak	Average
18.4% September 11, 2017	14.7% November 24, 2017	18.4% September 11, 2017	N/A

== See also ==
- List of programs broadcast by ABS-CBN
- List of ABS-CBN Studios original drama series
