= 100 Days to Heaven =

2011 Philippine television drama series

- Title card
- Genre: Christian drama
- Created by: ABS-CBN Studios; Dindo C. Perez; Julie Anne R. Benitez; Rondel P. Lindayag
- Written by: Shugo Praico; Crisanto Lim
- Directed by: Malu L. Sevilla; Jojo A. Saguin; Don M. Cuaresma
- Starring: Coney Reyes; Xyriel Manabat; Jodi Sta. Maria
- Music by: Jessie Lasaten
- Opening theme: "Mahiwaga" by Fatima Soriano with Mandaluyong Children's Choir
- Ending theme: "Mahiwaga" by Angeline Quinto
- Country of origin: Philippines
- Original language: Filipino
- No. of episodes: 140 (list of episodes)

Production
- Executive producers: Carlo Katigbak; Cory Vidanes; Laurenti Dyogi; Roldeo Endrinal
- Producer: Maya Manuel-Aralar
- Production locations: Metro Manila, Philippines
- Editor: Jay Mendoza
- Running time: 30–42 minutes
- Production company: Dreamscape Entertainment

Original release
- Network: ABS-CBN
- Release: May 9 – November 18, 2011

Related
- Mga Anghel na Walang Langit; May Bukas Pa; Agua Bendita; Momay; Dahil sa Pag-ibig; Nathaniel; Huwag Kang Mangamba; Love in 40 Days

100 Days to Heaven is a 2011 Philippine television drama series broadcast by ABS-CBN. Directed by Malu L. Sevilla, Jojo A. Saguin and Don M. Cuaresma, it stars Coney Reyes, Xyriel Manabat and Jodi Sta. Maria. It aired on the network's Primetime Bida line up and worldwide on TFC from May 9 to November 18, 2011, replacing Mutya and was replaced by Ikaw ay Pag-Ibig.

This is Coney Reyes' first lead role after having already portrayed supporting roles in teleseryes such as Sa Puso Ko, Iingatan Ka, Ysabella, and Rubi. The series is streaming online on YouTube.

== Overview ==
This show has been developed by Mga Anghel na Walang Langit, Princess Sarah, May Bukas Pa, Agua Bendita, Momay, and Mutya due to genre of family and religious-oriented drama series where Dreamscape Entertainment released these types of series since 2005. It co-existed with Budoy from October 10 to November 18, 2011, and was succeeded by Ikaw ay Pag-Ibig on November 21, 2011.

On March 14, 2020, during the past eight years after the end of the show's original airing on November 18, 2011, ABS-CBN announced that 100 Days to Heaven will be re-airing on Primetime Bida beginning on March 16, 2020, temporarily replacing Pamilya Ko as part of the network's special programming block during the Enhanced community quarantine in Luzon done to stop the spread of the COVID-19 pandemic in the Philippines which necessitated the network to suspend teleserye tapings.

However, the re-runs were moved to 5:05 pm as the network decided to give the timeslot to a rerun of Meteor Garden's 2018 remake.

This rerun was abruptly cut due to the temporary closure of ABS-CBN's free to air stations following the cease and desist order issued by the National Telecommunications Commission on account of its franchise expiration. It also had a rerun in 2015 on YouTube which includes all 140 episodes.

Year	Episode	No. of episodes	First aired	Last aired	First aired (overall)	Last aired (overall)
2011	1– 133	133	May 9, 2011	November 9, 2011	May 9, 2011	November 18, 2011
2011	134–140	7	November 10, 2011	November 18, 2011	May 9, 2011	November 18, 2011

== Production ==
The series was announced on February 24, 2011, when ABS-CBN registered for the trademark and copyright of the show, and then its trailer for the show was released. Taping or principal photography for the series were done for 6 months from May 9 to November 18, 2011. Overall, production process of the series which included its announcement spanned for 9 months.

== Premise ==
Anna Manalastas (Coney Reyes) is the dictator of a toy company that she built. In the past, she was a smart and talented little girl who never saw her mother. Her father mistreats and threatens her whenever she tries to impress him, although the actions of her father were out of discipline. She got pregnant later in her life, and for this her father got very mad. At her father's deathbed, she was taught how humans can never be capable of goodness.

After giving birth, Anna gave her daughter away since she did not think she could adequately raise the child and provide proper love and support for her. She then grows up to be mean, selfish, obnoxious and greedy due to her troubled past. Later on she was killed in a car explosion, an orchestrated "accident" which was planned by her most trusted employee's (Bobby) wife, Miranda. As she was about to be condemned to hell, Tagabantay, the gatekeeper of heaven, gives her a second chance after bargaining. She gets a chance to live again and make amends with those whom she wronged while still alive, but as a child, and for only 100 days.

In her quest for redemption, she'll be helped by people she thought were insignificant, and eventually run into her own daughter who will prove crucial to her own mission. Little did she know also that aside from changing for the greater good, Anna was also sent back to life in the last days of her moment, to also find love and peace that was never given to her on her early days, including to discover who is her real daughter.

== Cast and characters ==
=== Main cast ===
- Coney Reyes as Madame Anna Manalastas (Age 56)

The protagonist. Anna is the evil and ruthless former owner of the Toy Company. After her death, Tagabantay tells her that she cannot enter heaven because of all the bad things she did in her life. Fortunately, Tagabantay gives her a second chance to correct her past mistakes by returning to Earth in her childhood form. Once she is back on Earth, she meets Kevin, a young boy who has a sister, Sophia who later reveals to be her daughter. With the help of Sophia and her family, she must find all the people she hurt and correct what she has done in her past life. Over time, she'll learn to feel love and life values she had not known before because of her tragic past. She made Sophia enter her company as Sophia Mendoza, a marketing consultant for her mission. While finding for her daughter that she abandoned, she secretly followed a lead, her old maid, Digna, revealing, Sophia Delgado is her biological daughter. In the end, she learned the real meaning of love, forgiveness, and sacrifice.

- Xyriel Manabat as Young Anna Manalastas (Age 7)

She is evil and snobbish at first but learns to change for the good when Tagabantay gave her second chance to come back to Earth and her younger self will serve as her vessel. While doing her mission on earth, she will be able to meet Sophia Delgado and her family through Kevin, Sophia's step brother to be revealed. As she stays with their family and sees their condition, she offers her a big amount of money, but Sophia needing to help her with her mission. While she does her mission with her, she develops a good relationship with Sophia and her "cousins", Bruce and Jopet. She voices another girl at the end of the last episode.

- Shaina Magdayao as Teen/Young Adult Anna Manalastas (Age 21)
- Jodi Sta. Maria as Sophia Manalastas Mosqueda / Trisha Manalastas / Sophia Mendoza

A good character. She agrees to help Anna by having a false identity and work at The Toy Company. Over the days, she'll learn to know Anna Manalastas and be her best friend. Little does she know that she is the multi-million dollar heiress to her biological mother's inheritance. She will eventually learn who her biological mother is and if she is willing to accept her inheritance her biological mother's company. In the end, she learns to forgive and accept her biological mother, even before her mother was able to accomplish her mission and enter the gates of heaven. She was able to get the company that her mother worked for and had a happy ever after with Bart and her adoptive father, Andres.

=== Supporting cast ===
- Dominic Ochoa as Bobby Ramirez†

Anna’s former assistant at The Toy Company, where he once worked as a carrier of goods. On the eve of his death, Bobby sought forgiveness from Anna for his resentment toward her. He later entered Heaven, where Anna reunited with him at the series’ conclusion.

  - Enrique Gil as Teen Bobby Ramirez†
- Smokey Manaloto as Bruce Lim†

One of Sophia’s cheerful and kind-hearted street cousins, alongside Jopet. Bruce was later killed by Baldo. In the end, he reunited with Anna in Heaven.

- Valerie Concepcion as Miranda Salviejo-Ramirez

The main antagonist and Bobby’s wife, who orchestrated Anna’s murder.

  - Vangie Martelle as Teen Miranda Salviejo
- Rafael Rosell as Bartolome "Bart" Ramirez Jr.

Bobby’s younger brother, raised under Bobby’s guidance after their parents’ death. Though Bart admired Bobby and followed his advice, it conflicted with his passion for music. He worked for Anna as a midlevel manager, though she dismissed him as worthless. Bart eventually fell in love with Sophia Mendoza, later revealed as Anna’s heiress. He discovered her true identity but kept it secret, ultimately finding happiness with her.

- Joel Torre as Andres Delgado

A devoted father to Sophia and Kevin. Despite his disability, Andres worked tirelessly to provide for them. It was later revealed that he is Sophia’s adoptive father.

- Neil Coleta as Jopet Lim

Sophia’s street-smart cousin and scam partner with Bruce. He fell in love with Yanie Ramirez, though Anna’s mission complicated their relationship.

- Louise Abuel as Kevin Delgado†

A hopeful and active child who knew his time on Earth was limited. He died saving Anna from being hit by a car, later reuniting with her in Heaven.

- Noel Trinidad as Tagabantay / Saint Peter

The one who gave Anna the mission to correct her past mistakes within one hundred days before ascending to Heaven.

- Coco Martin as Young Tagabantay
- Jewel Mische as Jessica Cruz

The secondary antagonist and Bart’s fiancée. Jessica despised Sophia and Anna, scheming to marry Bart and later plotting Sophia’s death. She eventually learned Sophia was her cousin and the rightful heiress. After Sophia sold the company, Jessica was expelled and moved to Europe to start anew.

- Emmanuelle Vera as Yanie Ramirez

The youngest Ramirez sibling. Sweet and beautiful, she fell in love with Jopet.

- Rustica Carpio† as Lola Kayang Lim

A loving and humorous grandmother to Bruce and Jopet.

=== Guest cast ===
- Lui Manansala as Brenda
- Mark Gil^{†} as Norman Manalastas† – Anna’s strict father who mistreated her under the guise of discipline, shaping her into a cold and selfish tyrant. He died shortly before the series’ present timeline and was condemned to hell for destroying his daughter’s childhood and happiness.
- Pokwang as Digna Amparo† – Anna’s maid who was compelled to give up her child for adoption; she entrusted the infant to her friend Teresita and later passed away.
- Melai Cantiveros as Girlie – Anna’s former maid, fired for failing to wake her before the alarm rang.
  - Kiray Celis as Young Girlie
- Vice Ganda as August – A hairdresser fired for failing to serve Anna properly. He later opened his own beauty parlor, becoming a strict boss to his friends out of admiration for Anna, but eventually learned the true value of friendship.
- Gloria Romero^{†} as Lola Pilar† – An elderly sampaguita vendor mocked by Anna in the first episode. She was also Tikoy’s adoptive grandmother. She died in a car accident.
- Jason Abalos as Brando Rivero – Anna’s former driver, fired for texting while driving. His daughter died during surgery in episode 5.
- Chinggoy Alonzo† as Mr. Villanueva† – Owner of V-Toys Company, who died in episode 14.
- Xian Lim as Jojo Villanueva – Mr. Villanueva’s son.
- Sam Milby as Ruel Villanueva – Mr. Villanueva’s son.
- Empress Schuck as Gina Bernardo – A former Toy Company employee fired after a mistake during a meeting with Mr. Villanueva. She later suffered a miscarriage and became a beggar.
- Ron Morales as Baldomero "Baldo" Enriquez – One of Miranda’s men involved in Anna’s planned death.
- Vhong Navarro as Elpidio "Pido" Abucay – A former Toy Company employee accused of theft and fired. He now earns a living as a clown.
- Matt Evans as Paul – Gina’s husband and father of their lost child. Their marriage eventually ended in separation.
- Joonee Gamboa as Ricardo "Carding" Torres – A loyal Toy Company employee and Anna’s most trusted worker, though illiterate. Anna promised him a promotion if he learned to read and write, but he struggled and it was too late.
- Maricar Reyes as Emerald Capistrano – Julio’s daughter, who sought revenge against Anna for her father’s suffering. Eventually, she and her family received royalties from the Princess Emerald figure and found forgiveness.
  - Abby Bautista as Young Emerald Capistrano
  - Celine Lim as Pre-teen Emerald Capistrano
- Ricardo Cepeda as Julio Capistrano – Creator of the Princess Emerald design, which he sold cheaply. When the toy became popular, he demanded royalties, but Anna refused, citing lack of agreement. He resented her for outsmarting him.
- Tirso Cruz III as Rene Mosqueda† – Anna’s ex-boyfriend and Sophia’s biological father. He abandoned Anna and their child, later marrying Carmen. He died in episode 40 and did not appear in the finale in Heaven.
  - Felix Roco as Teen Rene Mosqueda†
- Liz Alindogan as Carmen Mosqueda – Rene’s wife.
  - Eda Nolan as Teen Carmen Mosqueda
- Cherry Pie Picache as Myrna Soledad – Owner of Three Angels Flower Shop. After Anna slandered her business over a mistake, she lost clients and separated from her children.
- Cheska Billiones as Claire Soledad – Myrna’s eldest daughter, adopted by her aunt, harboring resentment toward her mother.
- Jelo Eschaluce as Bryan Soledad – Myrna’s son, given to her sister Ibyang, who abused him.
- Veronica Louise Bernardo as Margaret Soledad – Myrna’s youngest daughter, adopted by another family.
- Yda Yaneza as Ibyang
- Gloria Diaz as Dolores Bustamante – Rachel’s adoptive mother.
- Rica Peralejo as Rachel Bustamante – Mistaken by Anna as her long-lost daughter, though not biologically related.
- Ogie Escanilla as Onin Abucay
- Khaycee Aboloc as Katkat Abucay
- Lui Villaluz as Marjorie
- Christopher de Leon as Ronaldo Quinio
- Albie Casiño as Reggie Quinio
  - Carlo Lacana as Young Reggie Quinio
- Angel Jacob as Dorothy Quinio
- Racquel Villavicencio as Minda
- Aria Clemente as Cielo
- William Lorenzo as Fidel
- Yayo Aguila as Teresita Delgado† – Sophia’s adoptive mother.
- Jayson Gainza as Eloy
- Tess Antonio as Minerva – Eloy’s girlfriend.
- Ivan Dorschner as Teen Bart Ramirez
- Bugoy Cariño as Tikoy
- Agot Isidro as Nurse Diana – Diana cared for Tikoy’s grandmother during her hospitalization and, after the grandmother’s death, adopted Tikoy.
- Tagabantay – A recurring figure appearing in various forms to guide Anna.
  - Albert Martinez as a Postman
  - Judy Ann Santos as a Chef
  - KC Concepcion as a Streetsweeper
  - Jericho Rosales as a Security Guard
  - Angel Locsin as a Nurse
  - Anne Curtis as a Protester
  - Richard Gomez as an Ice Cream Vendor
  - Vilma Santos as a Memorial Park Official
- Franco Daza as Dexter Alarcon
- John Lloyd Cruz as PO3 Jack De Guzman – A police officer who uncovered Anna’s hidden past and her daughter’s identity.
- Dante Rivero as Gen. Salazar
- Gerard Pizarras as Joey Salazar
- Paulo Avelino as Teddy Ledesma – CEO of Teddy’s Burger Corporation. A cheerful man who discovered his uncle Walter’s embezzlement but chose not to press charges, seeing Walter as a father figure.
- Philip Salvador as Walter Ledesma – Teddy’s uncle, embittered by inheritance issues. He admitted to firing Teddy out of envy and selfishness.
- Angelica Panganiban as Claire – An inmate befriended by Sophia. She was later released with Sophia and Bart’s help.
- Tetchie Agbayani as Claire’s Mother
- Ronaldo Valdez† as Atty. Galileo "Leo" Fonacier – Corporate lawyer of The Toy Company, hired by Anna for his strong performance after she dismissed her previous lawyer.
- Piolo Pascual as Dr. Ivan Carlos – A pediatric surgeon recommended to operate on Kevin after his accident. Haunted by the death of his own daughter during surgery, he struggled with fear of operating on another child.
- Dimples Romana as Angela Carlos – Dr. Ivan Carlos’ wife.
- Susan Roces^{†} as Amelita Manalastas Salvador† – Anna and Cecille’s mother, Sophia’s grandmother. She reunites with Anna in Heaven.
- Eddie Gutierrez as Mr. Salvador – Anna’s stepfather.
- Rita Avila as Cecille Salvador – Anna’s half-sister.
- Pen Medina as Tagasundo – A spirit that escorts souls to the afterlife, yet in Anna’s case, a demon intent on dragging her into hell.
  - Jake Cuenca as Young Tagasundo
- Archi Adamos as Guard

== Promotion ==
This series has been developed by Mga Anghel Na Walang Langit, Princess Sarah, May Bukas Pa, Agua Bendita, Momay, Noah, and Mutya due its genre of family, child-oriented, fantasy and religious drama series that has been produced by Dreamscape Entertainment lineup since 2005. It co-existed with Budoy from October 10 to November 18, 2011, and was succeeded by the said series.

== Reception ==
=== Ratings ===
100 Days premiered with a 32.1% rating based on Kantar Media Ratings. Since then, the show has been a constant top-rater on its timeslot. On its series finale, the show garnered a 38.7%. According to a survey done by Kantar Media Data, 100 Days, along with fellow ABS-CBN show, Minsan Lang Kita Iibigin, was the most watched program for the third quarter of 2011.

=== Awards and nominations ===
Year	Award	Category	Work	Result
2011	ASAP Pop Viewers' Choice Awards	Pop Kapamilya TV Show	100 Days to Heaven	Won
2011	ASAP Pop Viewers' Choice Awards	Pop Kapamilya TV Character	Coney Reyes and Xyriel Manabat as Anna Manalastalas	Nominated
2011	Golden Screen TV Awards	Outstanding Original Drama Series	100 Days to Heaven	Nominated
2011	Golden Screen TV Awards	Outstanding Performance by an Actress in a Drama Series	Xyriel Manabat	Nominated
2012	8th USTv Student's Choice Awards	Best Actress in a Daily Local Soap Opera	Xyriel Manabat	Won
2012	8th USTv Student's Choice Awards	Best Supporting Actress in a Daily Local Soap Opera	Jodi Sta. Maria	Won
2012	8th USTv Student's Choice Awards	Best Daily Local Soap Opera	100 Days to Heaven	Won
2012	10th Gawad TANGLAW for Television	Best Performance by an Actress	Xyriel Manabat	Won
2012	10th Gawad TANGLAW for Television	Best Drama Series	100 Days to Heaven	Won
2012	26th PMPC Star Awards For Television	Best Child Performer	Xyriel Manabat	Won
2012	43rd GMMSF Box-Office Entertainment Awards	Most Popular Male Child Performer	Bugoy Carino	Won
2012	43rd GMMSF Box-Office Entertainment Awards	Most Popular Female Child Performer	Xyriel Manabat	Won
2012	43rd GMMSF Box-Office Entertainment Awards	Most Popular TV Program Drama Series	100 Days to Heaven	Won

....

== See also ==
- List of programs broadcast by ABS-CBN
- Xyriel Manabat
- Coney Reyes
