= Mutya =

2011 Philippine television drama series

- Title card
- Genre: Drama; Fantasy
- Created by: Pablo S. Gomez
- Written by: Kay Conlu-Brondial; Arlene Tamayo; Noreen Capili; Rhoda Sulit
- Directed by: Erick C. Salud; Jojo A. Saguin
- Starring: Mutya Orquia
- Opening theme: "Sana" by Amy Nobleza
- Ending theme: "Hanggang May Kailanman" by Mutya Orquia
- Country of origin: Philippines
- Original language: Tagalog (Filipino)
- No. of episodes: 68

Production
- Executive producers: Roldeo T. Endrinal; Carlina D. Dela Merced
- Running time: 30-45 minutes
- Production company: Dreamscape Entertainment

Original release
- Network: ABS-CBN
- Release: January 31 – May 6, 2011

Mutya is a 2011 Philippine television drama fantasy series broadcast by ABS-CBN. The series is based on Pablo S. Gomez's comic of the same name. Directed by Erick C. Salud and Jojo A. Saguin, it stars Mutya Orquia in the title role. It aired on the network's Primetime Bida line up and worldwide on TFC from January 31 to May 6, 2011, replacing Noah and was replaced by 100 Days to Heaven.

This series is streaming online on YouTube.

== Overview ==
This show has been developed by Mga Anghel na Walang Langit, Princess Sarah, and May Bukas Pa due to genre of family, religious, and child-oriented drama series where Dreamscape Entertainment released these types of series since 2005. It was succeeded by 100 Days to Heaven also in 2011.

Year	Episodes	No. of episodes	No. of episodes (overall)	First aired	Last aired	First aired (overall)	Last aired (overall)
2011	1–63	63	68	February 7, 2011	April 29, 2011	February 7, 2011	May 6, 2011
2011	64–68	5	68	May 2, 2011	May 6, 2011	February 7, 2011	May 6, 2011

== Plot ==
Mutya (Mutya Orquia) a child mermaid, was the love child of Cordelia (Precious Lara Quigaman) a human, and Prinsipe Irvin (Alfred Vargas) the Prince of the seaworld kingdom. However, their relationship was forbidden as Irvin is set to be married with another royal mermaid, Nerissa (Niña Jose). Cordelia got pregnant at the time of their relationship, and was forced to give birth to the child. The child was born with an unknown disability, where her legs were attached to each other. Cordelia's mother, Delilah (Sandy Andolong), sees this, was horrified and she decided to abandon the child. She assigned Tonyo (Jayson Gainza) to take away the baby. However, Tonyo brought the child back to his home, treated her as their own and named her Mutya. As Mutya grows up, she was protected by her older brother Aries (Jairus Aquino), who has always been there for her. Mutya has still yet to realize that she is a mermaid. With her legs being attached to each other, it was mistaken as a disability although it was actually her mermaid tail slowly forming.

== Cast and characters ==
=== Main cast ===
Cast	Character	Summary
Mutya Orquia	Mutya/Prinsesa Mutya/Mutya Sardenas	A beautiful little girl who was mistakenly believed to have a disability with her feet attached to each other. She is the missing daughter of Haring Irvin and Cordelia.
Lara Quigaman	Cordelia "Ella" Sardenas	Mutya's mother who often seeks her long-lost daughter whom they believed she was dead. After she went to the doctor and heard that her daughter has a disability, she stopped looking, believing that the doctor tells enough evidence that her daughter is dead or alive.
Alfred Vargas	Prinsipe/Haring Irvin	The prince of the sea. After his father's death, he was imprisoned by the black mermaids and is hypnotized by Narissa's potions that makes him forget everything. After he realized this, he tried to stop the black mermaids from ruling the entire ocean. He learns that Mutya was his real daughter, not Chabita. The kataw manages to fight the black mermaids. With the help of his daughter's singing, he got the trident from them and rules the ocean.
Jairus Aquino	Aries	He took care of Mutya as his own. He knows who is her real mother and father are after dreaming it. He manages to keep it a secret because he is afraid to lose her.

=== Supporting cast ===
Cast	Character	Summary
Malou Crisologo	Reyna Octopina	The queen of the Black mermaids, the mother of Nerissa and the grandmother of Chabita. She had killed many humans, just to find the black pearl. She is one of the main antagonists of the series, the other one is her daughter Nerissa.|-
Ahron Villena	Zale	Irvin's cousin, who loved Nerissa and betrayed him. He is the real father of Chabita.
Niña Jose	Prinsesa Nerissa	The princess of the black mermaids. She became a fool because of her love for Irvin, she would do anything for Irvin. She is the mother of Chabita, In the end, she saved Irvin from her mother who tried to kill him, and she slept for a long time but was healed by Mutya's voice. She is one of the main antagonists of the series.
Gary Lim	Lolo Sheldon	Haring Merrick and Irvin's hand. He always helped Irvin in his problems and helped him to remember everything when he had amnesia.
Sandy Andolong	Madam Delilah Sardenas	Mutya's grandmother who was the one who assigned Tonyo to take the child away. She has a big business and she uses Mutya's singing to have more catches.
Amy Nobleza	Chabita	The daughter of Nerissa and Zale.
Jayson Gainza	Tonyo	The one who was assigned to take Mutya away. After the child was sprinkled with water, it immediately made its first cry, encouraging Tonyo to keep it. He is Aries's father and he died when Octopina drowns him.
Tess Antonio	Ester	Aries's mother. She died when she was left in Octopina's island.
Ogie Diaz	Rommel	
Yen Santos	Melinda	
Venus Raj	Mikki	
Cacai Bautista	Lagring	
Michael Conan	Rudy	
Lassy	Mameng	
Paolo Serrano	Walter	
Carlene Aguilar	Undin	
Eda Nolan	Brigit	

=== Special participation ===
- Pen Medina as Haring Merrick
- Izzy Canillo as Young Aries
- Carlo Lacana as Young Dennis
- April Sun as Sirena
- Justin Gonzales as Sireno
- Veyda Inoval as Jasmin: Mutya's bully in school. She was often scolded by her mom because her mom thinks she's lying about Mutya being a mermaid.
- Jovic Susim as Igat
- Joe Vargas as Lumot
- Jubail Andres as Eskale
- Allan de Paz as Tatang

== Episodes ==
=== Episodes 1–63 ===
No.	Title	Original release date
1	"Cordelia Meets Irvin (Pagtatagpo nina Cordelia at Irvin)"	January 31, 2011
2	"Forbidden Love Can Still Bear Wonderful and Even Magical Things (Bunga ng Pinagbabawal na Pag-ibig)"	February 1, 2011
3	"As She Grows Older, Mutya Slowly Notices Her Physical Difference with Other Children (Kakaibang Anyo ni Mutya)"	February 2, 2011
4	"Aries Protects His Sister from Bullies (Pagtatanggol ni Aries sa Kapatid)"	February 3, 2011
5	"Tonyo Decides to Keep Mutya Away from Her True Mother, Cordella (Pagkawalay ni Mutya sa Tunay na Ina)"	February 4, 2011
6	"Mutya's Life Is in Peril No Matter Where She Goes (Kapahamakan sa Buhay ni Mutya)"	February 7, 2011
7	"Tonyo's Family Decides to Leave Town to Save Mutya from Ridicule (Pagligtas ni Tonyo kay Mutya)"	February 8, 2011
8	"After a Mishap in the Ocean, Aries and Mutya Are Separated from Their Parents (Pagkawalay nina Aries at Mutya sa mga Magulang)"	February 9, 2011
9	"Aries and Mutya Face Harder Challenges in a New Town (Bagong Pagsubok nina Aries at Mutya)"	February 10, 2011
10	"Will Irvin Finally Catch Up with Cordella? (Pagtatagpo nina Irvin at Cordelia)"	February 11, 2011
11	"Cecilia Continues to Help Aries and Mutya Despite Her Drinking Problem (Pagtulong ni Cecilia kina Aries at Mutya)"	February 14, 2011
12	"Cecilia Continues to Stand as Aries and Mutya's Guardian (Bagong Magulang ng mga Ulila)"	February 15, 2011
13	"Mutya Discovers Her Connection to the Sea (Koneksyon sa Dagat)"	February 16, 2011
14	"Mutya Is Having a Hard Time Accepting Her Mermaid State (Pagtanggap sa pagiging Sirena)"	February 17, 2011
15	"Mutya Reunites with Her Brother (Muling Pagkikita nina Mutya at Aries)"	February 18, 2011
16	"Will Cordella See Mutya as a Mermaid? (Pagkasirena ni Mutya)"	February 21, 2011
17	"Aries Boosts Mutya's Confidence in the Waters (Lakas ng Loob ni Mutya)"	February 22, 2011
18	"Aries Tells Mutya to Swim Off to the Ocean to Save Herself from Death (Paglangoy Palayo sa Kamatayan)"	February 23, 2011
19	"Mutya Immerse Herself in the World of the Mermaids (Mundo ng mga Sirena)"	February 24, 2011
20	"Insecure Mermaids Connive to Terrorize Mutya (Inggit ng Ibang Sirena)"	February 25, 2011
21	"Chabita Continues to Bully Mutya (Pangbu-bully ni Chabita kay Mutya)"	February 28, 2011
22	"Chabita's Prank Causes a Mysterious Sickness to Mutya (Misteryosong Karamdaman ni Mutya)"	March 1, 2011
23	"Aries Captures a Mermaid (Nahuling Sirena ni Aries)"	March 2, 2011
24	"Aries and Cordella Are Held Hostage by the Black Mermaids (Mga Itim na Sirena)"	March 3, 2011
25	"Although Still Stuck in the Cave, Help Finds Its Way to Mutya (Saklolo para kay Mutya)"	March 4, 2011
26	"The Sea Creatures Begin to Think That Mutya is a Maharlika (Maharlika si Mutya)"	March 7, 2011
27	"After a Number of Years, Cordella and Irvin Cross Paths Again (Muling Pagkikita nina Cordelia at Irvin)"	March 8, 2011
28	"Octopina Wants to Be Sure of Mutya's True Identity (Paniniguro ni Octopina)"	March 9, 2011
29	"Will Mutya Survive on Her Own? (Pagliligtas sa Sarili)"	March 10, 2011
30	"Mutya and the Other Children Stick with Tatang (Si Mutya at si Tatang)"	March 11, 2011
31	"Will Aries See His Sister Again? (Magkikita pa kaya sina Aries at Mutya?)"	March 14, 2011
32	"Tatang Opts to Sell Mutya After Learning Her Secret (Pagbenta ni Tatang kay Mutya)"	March 15, 2011
33	"Mutya Tries to Escape from Tatang Before He Sells Her (Pagtakas ni Mutya kay Tatang)"	March 16, 2011
34	"Although Already Capable of Using Her Legs, Mutya Has to Pretend That She Is a Handicap (Paggamit ng Dalawang Paa)"	March 17, 2011
35	"Mutya Is Scared of Revealing Her Mermaid State to Cordella (Pagyapak sa Lupa)"	March 18, 2011
36	"Although Already on Land, Mutya Can Never Get Away from the Mermaid World (Paglisan sa Mundo ng Sirena)"	March 21, 2011
37	"Chabita Tells Aries Who She's Looking For"	March 22, 2011
38	"Will Aries and Mutya Be Able to Save Their Parents? (Pagliligtas sa mga Magulang)"	March 23, 2011
39	"Irvin Tries His Best to Restore Peace and Good Morale Among His Mermaid Kingdom (Kapayapaan sa Kaharian ng mga Sirena)"	March 24, 2011
40	"Irvin Maximizes the Use of His Temporary Feet (Pansamantalang Paa)"	March 25, 2011
41	"Will Tonyo Get Away from the Black Mermaids? (Paglayo sa mga Itim na Sirena)"	March 28, 2011
42	"Tonyo Shows the Black Pearl to Aries and Mutya (Ang Itim na Perlas)"	March 29, 2011
43	"Cordella Is Very Excited with Tonyo's Survival (Kaligtasan ni Tonyo)"	March 30, 2011
44	"Tonyo Is Worried of Her Family's Safety Because of Delilah"	March 31, 2011
45	"How Long Can Tonyo Keep the Truth from Mutya and Cordella? (Paglilihim ng Katotohanan)"	April 1, 2011
46	"Tonyo, Aries and Mutya Cherish Their Moments as a Family (Magkakasama bilang Pamilya)"	April 4, 2011
47	"Aries Is Worried of His Family's Safety (Kaligtasan ng Pamilya)"	April 5, 2011
48	"Mutya Goes Back to the Ocean (Pagbabalik sa Karagatan)"	April 6, 2011
49	"Prince Irvin Finally Finds the Courage to Face His Enemies (Tapang ng Prinsipe)"	April 7, 2011
50	"Prince Irvin Launches an Attack to the Black Mermaids (Pag-atake sa mga Itim na Sirena)"	April 8, 2011
51	"Mutya Ends Up in Danger While Playing Hide and Seek (Tagu-taguan)"	April 11, 2011
52	"Will Mutya Get Away from Her Kidnapper or Will Her Secret Be Revealed? (Pagtakas sa mga Kidnapper)"	April 12, 2011
53	"Mutya Is Desperate to Reconnect with His Real Father, Prinsipe Irvin (Tunay na Ama)"	April 13, 2011
54	"Mutya Still Falls in the Hands of School Bullies (Pambu-bully kay Mutya)"	April 14, 2011
55	"Irvin and Mutya Spend Time Together as Father and Daughter (Pagsasama bilang Mag-ama)"	April 15, 2011
56	"Aries Masks His Fear with Anger (Galit at Takot)"	April 18, 2011
57	"Chabita and Mutya Question Their Guardians Who Their Real Parents Are (Paghahanap sa Tunay na Magulang)"	April 19, 2011
58	"Irvin Tells Mutya That Cordella Is Her Real Mother (Tunay na Ina)"	April 20, 2011
59	"Irvin Loses Hope in Winning the Heart of Cordella (Pagkuha ng Loob ni Cordelia)"	April 25, 2011
60	"Delilah's Karma Gets Back at Her (Karma ni Delilah)"	April 26, 2011
61	"Mutya Reveals Her Fins to Her Classmate After She Sets Off to See Irvin (Pagpapakita ng Palikpik)"	April 27, 2011
62	"Octopina Plots Ahead to Lure Mutya to Her Lair (Bitag ni Octopina)"	April 28, 2011
63	"Mutya Won't Be Fully Happy Without Her Whole Family (Pangarap ng Buong Pamilya)"	April 29, 2011

=== Episodes 64–68 ===
No.	Title	Original release date
Episodes 64–68 – Prinsesa ng mga Sirena (Princess of the Mermaid); Mutya: Ang Huling Linggo (Mutya: The Last Week/The Last 5 Nights)
64	"Cordella Wants to Take Mutya to Manila Away from Irvin and the Mermaids"	May 2, 2011
65	"Mutya Enjoys the Life of Being the Mermaid Princess"	May 3, 2011
66	"How Long Will Mutya Be Held Captive in the Circus?"	May 4, 2011
67	"Octopina Launches a Full Blast War"	May 5, 2011
68	"Finale"	May 6, 2011

== Promotion ==
This series has been developed by Mga Anghel Na Walang Langit, Princess Sarah, May Bukas Pa, Agua Bendita, Momay, and Noah, due its genre of child-oriented, fantasy and religious drama series that produced by Dreamscape Entertainment since 2005 and it was succeeded by 100 Days to Heaven.

== See also ==
- List of programs broadcast by ABS-CBN
- List of ABS-CBN Studios original drama series
