= Mutya Orquia =

Filipino actress (born 2006)

- Born: Ruelleen Angel Orquia Olano; May 3, 2006 (age 20); Quezon City, Philippines
- Occupation: Actress
- Years active: 2009–present
- Agents: RDB Talents and Events Management (since 2009); Star Magic (since 2010); TV5 Network (since 2021); Advanced Media Broadcasting System (since 2024)
- Parent: Elizabeth Orquia (mother)

Ruelleen Angel "Mutya" Orquia Olano (Tagalog: [muˈtjaʔ ɔrˈkija]; born May 3, 2006) is a Filipino actress. She is best known for portraying the titular mermaid in Mutya (2011), young Jade Dimaguiba in My Binondo Girl (2011–2012), and Abigail Ruth "Abby" Lim in Be Careful With My Heart (2012–2014).

== Career ==
Orquia appeared as a regular cast member on the children's sketch comedy show Goin' Bulilit from 2012 to 2019.

In June 2013, Orquia was set to reprise her role as Abby in a theatrical adaptation of Be Careful With My Heart, which was intended for the 39th Metro Manila Film Festival, but the project was later canceled due to scheduling conflicts with the cast.

== Filmography ==
=== Film ===
Year	Title	Role	Notes
2024	When Magic Hurts	Grace "Olivia" Melchor	

=== Television ===
Year	Title	Role	Notes	Ref.
2010	Sabel	Young Sabel		
2011	Mutya	Mutya	Main role	
2011	Wansapanataym: Joy's Toys	Joy	Episode 41	
2011	My Binondo Girl	Young Jade	Episodes 1-8	
2011	Nasaan Ka Elisa?	Young Elisa		
2011	Ikaw ay Pag-Ibig	Tinay		
2012–2014	Be Careful With My Heart	Abigail Ruth "Abby" Lim		
2012–2019	Goin' Bulilit	Herself	Regular cast member	
2012	Wansapanataym: Maya Aksaya	Maya	Episode 74	
2012	Wansapanataym: Sandy and the Super Sandok	Super Sandok	Episode 80; voice role	
2012	ASAP	Herself	Presenter, ASAP Pop Viewer's Choice Awards	
2012	Sarah G. Live	Herself	Guest Performer	
2013	Minute to Win It	Herself	Celebrity Contestant	
2015	Maalaala Mo Kaya: Sanggol	Young Grace Poe	Season 23, Episode 13	
2015	Inday Bote	Young Inday	Special participation	
2015	Wansapanataym: My Kung Fu Chinito	Chloe Kalasiao	Episodes 249-257	
2015	Maalaala Mo Kaya: Camera	Rain	Season 23, Episode 24	
2015	Wansapanataym: Christmas Witch	Fairy Orchidia	Episode 274	
2015	Bagito	Young Vanessa Bueno	Guest Role	
2015	Flordeliza	Young Irene		
2016–2020	Umagang Kay Ganda	Main Host		
2016	Maalaala Mo Kaya: Toothbrush (Cong. Leni Robredo Story)	Jillan "Jill" Robredo	Season 24, Episode 5	
2016	Maalaala Mo Kaya: Paru-paro (Genesis Aala Story)	Young Genesis Aala	Season 24, Episode 42	
2016	Wansapanataym: Holly & Mau	Queen of the Fairies	Episodes 312-319	
2017	Home Sweetie Home	Val		
2017	Maalaala Mo Kaya: Ice Candy	Young Melanie	Season 25, Episode 27	
2017	Wildflower	Young Ana	Guest role / Protagonist, Season 2	
2017	The Promise of Forever	Young Sophia Madrid	Guest role / Protagonist	
2017	Maalaala Mo Kaya: Jumper (Jake Zyrus Story)	Young Charice Pempengco	Season 25, Episode 33	
2017	ASAP	Herself	Presenter, Children's Month Celebration	
2017	Ipaglaban Mo: Patol	Young Jessica	Episode 165	
2017	The Good Son	Young Olivia Gesmundo	Guest role / Antagonist	
2018	Maalaala Mo Kaya: Bibliya	Young Abigail	Season 26, Episode 3	
2018	Maalaala Mo Kaya: Ukulele	Young Tin	Season 26, Episode 21	
2018	Maalaala Mo Kaya: Cards	Adolescent Rosela	Season 26, Episode 24	
2018	Asintado	Young Natasha	Guest role / Antagonist, Season 2	
2019–2020	The Killer Bride	Young Alice	Guest role / Protagonist	
2019–2020	Pamilya Ko	Cherry Luz R. Mabunga	Main role / Protagonist	
2021–2022	Niña Niño	Veronica		
2022–2023	Mars Ravelo's Darna	Patricia "Tricia" Romero	Supporting role / Protagonist	
2023	Deadly Love	Young Tessa	Uncredited	
2025	Maalaala Mo Kaya: Lobo	Marlyn	Season 31, Episode 9	
2025	Estudyantipid	Isay		
2025	Rainbow Rumble	Herself	Season 2, Episode 32	
2025–2026	What Lies Beneath	Louisa Mae Soria	Special participation / Protagonist	
2026	The Silent Noise	Pia Carpio	Main role / Protagonist	

=== Digital media ===
Year	Title	Role
2021	Click, Like, Share: Barter	Joan
2023	Pie Live	Celebrity Guest
2023	Kuya Dags	Celebrity Guest

=== Music videos ===
Year	Title	Artist	Role
2024	Vanilla Bean	Peyton	Guest Artist/Love Interest

== Discography ==
=== Album ===
Year	Title	Song
2014	Be Careful With My Heart (The Lullaby Album)	Angel of God

=== Concert ===
Year	Title	Venue
2019	The Baby is Now a Lady (The Birthday Concert)	Skydome, SM North Edsa

== Accolades ==
Awards and NominationsAwards and nominations received by Mutya Orquia
Award	Year	Category	Nominated work	Result	Ref.
FMTM Awards for TV Entertainment	2012	Best Child Performance	Be Careful With My Heart	Won	
Gawad Tanglaw Awards	2013	Best Ensemble Performance (Note: Shared with the cast of Be Careful With My Heart.)	Be Careful With My Heart	Won	
GMMSF Box-Office Entertainment Awards	2014	Most Popular Female Child Performer	Be Careful With My Heart	Won	
PMPC Star Awards for Movies	2025	New Movie Actress of the Year	When Magic Hurts	Nominated	
PMPC Star Awards for Movies	2025	Movie Love Team of the Year (Note: Shared with Beaver Magtalas.)	When Magic Hurts	Nominated	
PMPC Star Awards for Television	2011	Best New Female TV Personality	Mutya	Nominated	
PMPC Star Awards for Television	2015	Best Comedy Actress	Goin' Bulilit	Nominated	
PMPC Star Awards for Television	2017	Best Comedy Actress	Goin' Bulilit	Nominated	
Yahoo OMG! Awards	2013	Child Star of the Year	Be Careful With My Heart	Nominated	
