= List of programs broadcast by Jeepney TV =

Jeepney TV is a Philippine pay television channel owned by Creative Programs, a subsidiary of ABS-CBN Corporation. The channel consists of classic television programs from ABS-CBN. The following is a list of all television original programming by Jeepney TV since it began its television operations in 2012.

== Current original programming ==
Legend
(†)	Returning Title
(‡)	Recap

=== Drama ===
- Bagito† (2014–2015)
- Be My Lady† (2016)
- Bridges of Love† (2015)
- Darating ang Umaga (2003)
- Dream Dad† (2014–2015)
- Familia Zaragoza† (1996–1997)
- Huwag Kang Mangamba† (2021)
- It Might Be You† (2003–2004)
- Labs Ko si Babe (1999–2000)
- May Isang Pangarap† (2013)
- Nathaniel† (2015)
- Precious Hearts Romances Presents: Los Bastardos† (2018–2019)
- Sa Piling Mo† (2006)
- Saan Ka Man Naroroon† (1999–2001)
- Since I Found You† (2018)
- Sineserye Presents: May Minamahal† (2007)
- The Better Half† (2017)
- The Good Son† (2017–2018)
- Vietnam Rose† (2005–2006)

=== Fantasy/Horror/Adventure ===
- !Oka Tokat† (1997–2002)
- Aryana† (2012–2013)
- Imortal† (2010–2011)
- Lastikman† (2007–2008)
- Mirabella† (2014)
- Starla† (2019–2020)
- Wansapanataym Presents† (2010–2019)

=== Variety/musical and talk shows ===
- ASAP Remix (2012–present)
- Magandang Buhay† (2018–2020; 2024–2026)

=== Comedy ===
- Home Along Da Riles† (1992–2003)
- Oki Doki Doc† (1993–2000)

=== Local programs from ABS-CBN Studios ===
==== Weekly primetime variety ====
- ASAP XP (2026–present) (delayed telecast from Kapamilya Channel, A2Z, All TV, and TV5, also on Metro Channel)

=== Religious programming ===
- Kapamilya Daily Mass (2020–present; delayed telecast from Kapamilya Channel and All TV, also on Metro Channel)
- The Healing Eucharist (2012–present) (delayed telecast from Kapamilya Channel, All TV and The Healing Eucharist official YouTube channel)

== Former original programming ==
=== Local dramas ===
- 100 Days to Heaven (2011)
- 2 Good 2 Be True (2022)
- A Beautiful Affair (2012–2013)
- A Family Affair (2022)
- A Love to Last (2017)
- A Soldier's Heart (2020)
- All of Me (2015–2016)
- And I Love You So (2015–2016)
- Angelito: Ang Bagong Yugto (2012)
- Angelito: Batang Ama (2011–2012)
- Ang Munting Paraiso (1999–2002)
- Ang sa Iyo ay Akin (2020–2021)
- Annaliza (2013–2014)
- Apoy sa Dagat (2013)
- Asintado (2018)
- Bagong Umaga (2020–2021)
- Basta't Kasama Kita (2003–2004)
- Be Careful With My Heart (2012–2014)
- Blood vs Duty (2026)
- Born for You (2016)
- Budoy (2011–2012)
- Bukas na Lang Kita Mamahalin (2013)
- Calla Lily (2006)
- Can't Buy Me Love (2023–2024)
- Crazy for You (2006)
- Dahil May Isang Ikaw (2009–2010)
- Dahil sa Pag-ibig (2012)
- Dirty Linen (2023)
- Doble Kara (2015–2017)
- Dolce Amore (2016)
- Dugong Buhay (2013)
- Eva Fonda (2008–2009)
- FlordeLiza (2015)
- Flower of Evil (2022)
- Forevermore (2014–2015)
- FPJ's Ang Probinsyano (2015–2022)
- Give Love on Christmas (2014–2015)
- Got to Believe (2013–2014)
- Green Rose (2011)
- Gulong ng Palad (2006)
- Guns and Roses (2011)
- Habang May Buhay (2010)
- Halik (2018–2019)
- Hanggang Saan (2017–2018)
- Hawak Kamay (2014)
- He's Into Her (2021–2022)
- High Street (2024)
- Hiram (2004–2005)
- Honesto (2013–2014)
- How to Spot a Red Flag (2025)
- Huwag Ka Lang Mawawala (2013)
- Iisa Pa Lamang (2008)
- Ikaw ang Lahat sa Akin (2005)
- Ikaw ay Pag-Ibig (2011–2012)
- Ikaw Lamang (2014)
- Ikaw Lang ang Iibigin (2017–2018)
- Ina, Kapatid, Anak (2012–2013)
- Incognito (2025)
- Init sa Magdamag (2021)
- Ipaglaban Mo (2014–2020)
- It's Okay to Not Be Okay (2025)
- Kadenang Ginto (2018–2020)
- Kahit Isang Saglit (2008)
- Kahit Konting Pagtingin (2013)
- Kahit Puso'y Masugatan (2012–2013)
- Katorse (2009–2010)
- Kay Tagal Kang Hinintay (2002–2003)
- Kung Ako'y Iiwan Mo (2012)
- Kung Tayo'y Magkakalayo (2010)
- La Luna Sangre (2017–2018)
- La Vida Lena (2021–2022)
- Langit Lupa (2016–2017)
- Lavender Fields (2024–2025)
- Ligaw na Bulaklak (2008)
- Linlang: The Teleserye Version (2024)
- Lorenzo's Time (2012)
- Love in 40 Days (2022)
- Love Thy Woman (2020)
- Lovers in Paris (remake) (2009)
- Maalaala Mo Kaya (1991–2022)
- Maging Sino Ka Man (Book 1) (2006–2007)
- Maging Sino Ka Man (Book 2) (2007–2008)
- Magkano ang Iyong Dangal? (2010)
- Magkaribal (2010)
- Magpahanggang Wakas (2016–2017)
- Mangarap Ka (2004)
- Mara Clara (remake) (2010–2011)
- Margarita (2007)
- Maria Flordeluna (2007)
- Maria la del Barrio (2011–2012)
- Maria Mercedes (2013–2014)
- Marry Me, Marry You (2021–2022)
- May Bukas Pa (2009–2010)
- Mga Anghel na Walang Langit (2005–2006)
- Minsan Lang Kita Iibigin (2011)
- Moon of Desire (2014)
- Mula sa Puso (original) (1997–1999)
- Mula sa Puso (remake) (2011)
- Muling Buksan ang Puso (2013)
- Mundo Man ay Magunaw (2012)
- My Binondo Girl (2011–2012)
- My Dear Heart (2017)
- My Girl (remake) (2008)
- Nagsimula sa Puso (2009–2010)
- Nang Ngumiti ang Langit (2019)
- Nasaan Ka, Elisa? (2011–2012)
- Nasaan Ka Maruja? (2009)
- Nasaan Ka Nang Kailangan Kita (2015)
- Ngayon at Kailanman (2018–2019)
- Ningning (2015–2016)
- Oh My G! (2015)
- Only You (2009)
- On the Wings of Love (2015–2016)
- Pamilya Sagrado (2024)
- Pangako sa 'Yo (original) (2000–2002)
- Pangako sa 'Yo (remake) (2015–2016)
- Pangarap na Bituin (2007)
- Parasite Island (2019)
- Pasión de Amor (2015–2016)
- Pieta (2008–2009)
- Playhouse (2018–2019)
- Precious Hearts Romances Presents Collection
  - Alyna (2010–2011)
  - Ang Lalaking Nagmahal Sa Akin (2009)
  - Araw Gabi (2018)
  - Bud Brothers (2009)
  - Hiyas (2012)
  - Impostor (2010)
  - Kristine (2010–2011)
  - Love Me Again (2010)
  - Lumayo Ka Man sa Akin (2012)
  - Mana Po (2011)
  - Midnight Phantom (2010)
  - My Cheating Heart (2009–2010)
  - Paraiso (2012–2013)
  - Pintada (2012)
  - Quikilig! (2010)
  - Somewhere in My Heart (2009)
- Princess and I (2012–2013)
- Prinsesa ng Banyera (2007–2008)
- Pure Love (remake) (2014)
- Pusong Ligaw (2017–2018)
- Reputasyon (2011–2012)
- Roja (2025–2026)
- Rubi (2010)
- Sa Puso Ko, Iingatan Ka (2001–2003)
- Sa Sandaling Kailangan Mo Ako (1998–1999)
- Sabel (2010–2011)
- Sana Bukas Pa ang Kahapon (2014)
- Sana Dalawa ang Puso (2018)
- Sana Maulit Muli (2007)
- Sandugo (2019–2020)
- Sarah the Teen Princess (2004)
- Saving Grace: The Untold Story (2025)
- Senior High (2023–2024)
- Sineserye Presents Collection
  - Hiram na Mukha (2007)
  - Natutulog Ba ang Diyos? (2007)
  - Palimos ng Pag-ibig (2007)
  - Patayin Sa Sindak Si Barbara (2008)
  - Florinda (2009)
  - Maligno (2008)
- Sino ang Maysala?: Mea Culpa (2019)
- Sins of the Father (2025)
- Star Drama Presents (1993–2001)
- Tanging Yaman (2010)
- Tayong Dalawa (2009)
- The Alibi: Ang Buong Katotohanan (2026)
- The Blood Sisters (2018)
- The Broken Marriage Vow (2022)
- The General's Daughter (2019)
- The Greatest Love (2016–2017)
- The Haunted (2019–2020)
- The Iron Heart (2022–2023)
- The Killer Bride (2019–2020)
- The Legal Wife (2014)
- The Promise of Forever (2017)
- The Story of Us (2016)
- The Wedding (2009)
- Till I Met You (2016–2017)
- Tubig at Langis (2016)
- Two Wives (remake) (2014–2015)
- Viral Scandal (2021–2022)
- Walang Hanggan (2012)
- Walang Hanggang Paalam (2020–2021)
- Walang Iwanan (2015)
- We Will Survive (2016)
- What Lies Beneath (2025–2026)
- Wildflower (2017–2018)
- You're My Home (2015–2016)
- Your Song (2006–2011)
- Ysabella (2007–2008)

=== Fantasy/Horror/Adventure ===
- Agimat: Ang Mga Alamat ni Ramon Revilla (2009–2011)
- Agua Bendita (2010)
- Bagani (2018)
- Da Adventures of Pedro Penduko (2006–2007)
- Darna (2022–2023)
- Dyesebel (2014)
- Dyosa (2008–2009)
- E-Boy (2012)
- Galema: Anak ni Zuma (2013–2014)
- Hiwaga ng Kambat (2019)
- Inday Bote (2015)
- Juan dela Cruz (2013)
- Kambal sa Uma (2009)
- Kampanerang Kuba (2005)
- Komiks Presents (2006–2009)
- Kokey (2007)
- Kokey at Ako (2010)
- Krystala (2004–2005)
- Kung Fu Kids (2008)
- Little Champ (2013)
- Lobo (2008)
- Marina (2004)
- Momay (2010)
- Mutya (2011)
- My Little Juan (2013)
- My Super D (2016)
- Nginiig (2004–2006)
- Noah (2010–2011)
- Panday (2005–2006)
- Princess Sarah (2007)
- Rosalka (2010)
- Spirits (2004–2005)
- Super Inggo (2006–2007)
- Super Inggo 1.5: Ang Bagong Bangis (2007)
- Wako Wako (2012)
- Wansapanataym Classics (1997–2005)
- WansapanaSummer (2013–2015)

=== Comedy ===
- Abangan ang Susunod Na Kabanata (1991–1997)
- Ang Tanging Ina (2003–2005)
- Arriba, Arriba! (2000–2003)
- Banana Split (season 1) (2008–2011)
- Banana Split: Extra Scoop (2011–2015)
- Banana Sundae (2015–2021)
- Bida si Mister, Bida si Misis (2002–2005)
- Bora: Sons of the Beach (2005–2006)
- Chika Chika Chicks (1987–1991)
- George and Cecil (2009–2010)
- Goin' Bananas (1987–1991)
- Goin' Bulilit (2005–2019)
- John en Shirley (2006–2007)
- Klasmeyts (2002–2004)
- Mary D' Potter (2001–2002)
- OK Fine, Whatever (2002–2006)
- Onli In Da Pilipins (1997–1998)
- Palibhasa Lalake (1987–1998)
- Pwedeng Pwede (1999–2001)
- Quizon Avenue (2005–2006)
- Richard Loves Lucy (1998–2001)
- Super Laff-In (1996–1999)
- Tarajing Potpot (1999–2000)
- Toda Max (2011–2013)
- Volta (2008)
- Whattamen (2001–2004)

=== Youth-oriented programming ===
- Ang TV (1992–1997)
- Berks (2002–2004)
- G-mik! (1999–2002)
- Gimik (1996–1999)
- Goin' Bulilit Classics (2005–2019)
- Good Vibes (2011)
- Growing Up (2011–2012)
- Tabing Ilog (1999–2003)

=== Game shows/reality television ===
- Bet on Your Baby (2013–2014, 2014–2015, 2017)
- Celebrity Playtime (2015–2016)
- Dance Kids (2015)
- Family Feud (2016–2017)
- I Can Do That (2017)
- I Dare You (2011, 2013)
- I Love OPM (2016)
- Kapamilya, Deal or No Deal (season 5) (2015–2016)
- Little Big Shots (2017)
- Milyon Milyon Na, Game Ka Na Ba? (2002–2003)
- Next Level Na, Game Ka Na Ba? (2003–2004)
- Pilipinas Got Talent (season 5) (2016); (season 6) (2018)
- Pinoy Big Brother: 737 (2015)
- Pinoy Big Brother: Kumunity Season 10 (2021–2022)
- Pinoy Big Brother: Teen Edition 1 (2006)
- Pinoy Bingo Night (2009)
- Pilipinas, Game Ka Na Ba? (2007–2009)
- Panahon Ko 'To!: Ang Game Show ng Buhay Ko (2010)
- Qpids (2005)
- StarDance (2005)
- Star Hunt: The Grand Audition Show (2018)
- The Singing Bee (seasons 6–7) (2013–2015)
- The Kids' Choice (2018)
- We Love OPM (2016)
- World of Dance Philippines (2019)
- Your Face Sounds Familiar Kids (season 1) (2016); (season 2) (2018)

=== Variety/musical and talk shows ===
- Ryan Ryan Musikahan (1988–1995)
- Tatak Pilipino (1990–1995)
- The Best of Gandang Gabi, Vice! (2011–2020)
- The Best of The Sharon Cuneta Show (1988–1997)
- Tonight with Dick & Carmi (1988–1995)

=== American programming ===
- Baywatch (2015)
- Jane the Virgin (2016)

=== Anime ===
- Anne of Green Gables (2023)
- Charlotte (2022)
- Hero Zone (2018)
  - KonoSuba (2018)
  - New Initial D Trilogy (2018)
  - Yu-Gi-Oh! Arc-V (2018)
- Judy Abbott (2022, re-run, 2023)
- Little Women II (2022)
- Marco (2022, re-run, 2023)
- Peter Pan and Weddy (2022)
- The Trapp Family Singers (2022–2023)

=== Asianovelas ===
- A Gentleman's Dignity (2014)
- A Promise of a Thousand Days (2016)
- Angel Eyes (2016)
- Blade Man (2016)
- Blood (2016)
- Boys Over Flowers (2014)
- Cheongdam-dong Alice (2017)
- Cunning Single Lady (2017)
- Doctor Stranger (2017)
- Emergency Couple (2017)
- Ever Night: War of Brilliant Splendours (2022–2023)
- Fated to Love You (Korean version) (2016)
- Gangnam Beauty (2021)
- Good Doctor (2016)
- Heard It Through the Grapevine (2018)
- Hyde Jekyll, Me (2018)
- It's Okay, That's Love (2017)
- Lakbay Japan (2014–2015)
  - Asuko March (2015)
  - Barasu (2015)
  - Fukuoka Love Stories (2015)
  - He's Beautiful (2015)
  - I'll Still Love You 10 Years from Now (2014)
  - Partners By Blood (2015)
  - Please Eat This (2015)
  - Starman (2016)
  - Takeshi's Medical Check-Up (2014)
  - The Before and After (2015)
- Let's Get Married (2015)
- Love in the Moonlight (2018)
- Love Scout (2026)
- Love Your Enemy (2026)
- Lovers in Paris (original) (2015)
- Mask (2018)
- Meteor Garden (2014)
  - Meteor Garden II (2014)
  - Meteor Rain (2014)
- My Girl (original) (2014)
- My Girlfriend is a Gumiho (2014)
- My Lovely Girl (2015)
- Miss Ripley (2014)
- Meow, The Secret Boy (2022)
- My Love Donna (2016)
- Oh My Lady! (2018)
- Orange Marmalade (2017)
- Princess Hours (2015)
- Protect the Boss (2014–2015)
- Pure Love (original) (2014)
- Queen Mantis (2026)
- Rooftop Prince (2015)
- Sensory Couple (2018)
- Taxi Driver (2024–2025)
- The Heirs (2017)
- The K2 (2017–2018)
- The King is in Love (2021)
- The Thorn Birds (2015)
- The World of a Married Couple (2020)
- Touch Your Heart (2022)
- Two Wives (original) (2015)
- Twenty Again (2017)
- Unforgettable Love (2016)
- Warm and Cozy (2018)
- When a Man Falls in Love (2013–2014)
- Winter Sonata (2015)

=== Film presentation ===
- Back to the Movies (2015–2016)
- FPJ: Da King Magpakailanman (2013–2018)
- Kid Sine Presents (2021–2024)
- Knockout Avenue (2018)
- Let's Do Sabado (2012–2015)
- Let's Go Linggo (2012–2015)
- Pasada Astig (2016–2017)
- Pasada Pelikula (2017–2024)
- Reteatro (2012–2014, 2015–2016)
- Sunday Hi-Way (2015–2017)
- Tatak James Bond (2017–2018)

=== Current affairs ===
- Swak na Swak (produced by Bayan Productions; 2017–2020)

=== Cartoons ===
- Johnny Test (2021, re-run, 2022)
- Kongsuni and Friends (2021–2022)
- Max Steel (2021–2022)
- Robocar Poli (2022–2023)
- The Garfield Show (2021–2022)

=== Channel-produced programming ===
- Ask Angelica (2020)
- Bets 10 Bets (2024)
- B.T.S. (2014–2017)
- Biyaheng Retro (2013–2017)
- Biyaheng Retro 2.0. (2022)
- Good Vibes with Edu (2020)
- Game Ka Na Ba? (2020–2021)
- I Feel U (2020–2021) (produced by ABS-CBN Films, ABS-CBN Music and The Filipino Channel)
- Jeepney TV Fan Favorite Awards Showcase (2022)
- JTV Star Showcase (2013–2018)
- Kumu Star Ka! (2021–2022)
- Laugh Laban (2021–2022)
- Lucky Home (2023)
- Over a Glass or Two (2023, 2024)
- Pamilya Talk with Tita Jing (2023–2024)
- Pinoy Paranormal Stories (2023)
- Proyekto Pilipino (2022–2024)
- Real Talk: The Heart of the Matter (2021)
- Stars on Stars (2023)
- Showbiz Pa More! (2018–2021)
- Showbiz Play Pa More (2021–2022)
- Star Ka (2024)
- The Best Talk (2021)
- We Rise Together (2020–2022)

=== Television programs from ABS-CBN Entertainment and ABS-CBN Current Affairs ===
==== Weekday Mornings/Afternoon Current Affairs ====
(Exclusive for TeleRadyo only. Re-runs due to shutdown of ABS-CBN broadcast stations because of expired franchise)

- #NoFilter (2019–2020)
- DocuCentral Presents (2019)
- Failon Ngayon (2018–2020)
- Kuha Mo! (2019–2020)
- Pareng Partners (2018–2019)
- Local Legends (2019–2020)
- Matanglawin (2018–2020)
- Mission Possible (2018–2020)
- My Puhunan (2018–2020)
- Rated K (2018–2020)
- Red Alert (2018–2019)
- Sports U (2018–2020)
- TNT: Tapatan ni Tunying (2018–2019)

==== Daily afternoon/Evening variety ====
(Exclusive for ABS-CBN only, due to shutdown of ABS-CBN broadcast stations because of expired franchise, except with live telecast exclusive for Kapamilya Channel)

- ASAP: Encore (2018, 2024–2026) (encore telecast from ABS-CBN, 1 week delayed)
- ASAP Natin 'To: Encore (2019–2024) (encore telecast from ABS-CBN, 1 week delayed)
- It's Showtime (2018–2024) (Same day live simulcast from Kapamilya Channel, A2Z, and GTV)
- It's Your Lucky Day (2023) (Same day live simulcast from Kapamilya Channel, A2Z, and GTV)
- Magandang Buhay: Momshies sa Hapon (2018–2020) (encore telecast from ABS-CBN)

==== Weekly documentary series ====
(Same day simulcast from Kapamilya Channel and A2Z)

- Iba 'Yan! (2020–2021)
- KBYN: Kaagapay ng Bayan (2022–2023)
- Paano Kita Mapasasalamatan? (2020–2021)

==== Daily afternoon newscast ====
- News Patrol (2023)
- TV Patrol Express (2024–2026)

=== Infomercials ===
- O Shopping (2020)

=== Free TV Channel ===
- Jeepney TV sa All TV (2024–2026)
- Jeepney TV sa Studio 23 (2012–2014)

=== Kid-oriented ===
- Team Yey! Famtime (2022–2024)
- Team Yey! Vlogs (2023–2024)

=== Religious programming ===
- Kapamilya Journey's of Hope (2020–2024; delayed telecast from Kapamilya Channel)
- Kapamilya Sunday Mass (2020–2024)

== Jeepney TV on YouTube ==
Jeepney TV also streams their programs and the fast-cuts or full episodes of some of classic ABS-CBN shows on YouTube. Some of the programs listed here have fast-cuts of episodes and full episodes at the same time.

- !Oka Tokat (1997–2002)
- Aalog-Alog (2006–2007)
- Agimat: Ang Mga Alamat ni Ramon Revilla (2009–2011)
- Agua Bendita (2010)
- Ang Tanging Ina (2003–2005)
- Aryana (2012–2013)
- Banana Nite (2013-2015)
- Banana Split (2008-2011)
- Banana Split: Daily Servings (2009-2011)
- Banana Sundae (2015-2020)
- Berks (2002–2004)
- Bora (2005–2006)
- Bituin (2002–2003)
- Bituing Walang Ningning (2006)
- Da Body en Da Guard (2001)
- Da Pilya En Da Pilot (2001–2002)
- Dyosa (2008–2009)
- Esperanza (1997–1999)
- Flames (1996–2002)
- Gandang Gabi, Vice! Classics (2011-2020)
- George and Cecil (2009–2010)
- Gimik (1996–1999)
- Goin' Bulilit Classics (2005–2019)
- Home Along Da Airport (2003–2005)
- Home Along Da Riles (1992–2003)
- Home Boy (2005-2007)
- John En Shirley (2006–2007)
- Judy Ann Drama Special (1999–2001)
- Kapag May Katwiran... Ipaglaban Mo! (1992–1999)
- Kambal sa Uma (2009)
- Kampanerang Kuba (2005)
- Komiks (2006–2008)
- Kris & Tell (2001)
- Kung Fu Kids (2008)
- Krystala (2004–2005)
- Labs Ko Si Babe (1999–2000)
- Langit Lupa (2016–2017)
- Let's Go (2006–2007)
- Lorenzo's Time (2012)
- Love Spell (2006–2008)
- Maalaala Mo Kaya (1991–2022)
- Magpahanggang Wakas (2016–2017)
- Mara Clara (1992–1997)
- Marina (2004)
- Marinella (1999–2001)
- Mary D' Potter (2001–2002)
- May Bukas Pa (2009–2010)
- May Isang Pangarap (2013)
- Meteor Fever in Manila (2003)
- Mirabella (2014)
- Mula sa Puso (1997–1999)
- Mutya (2011)
- My Binondo Girl (2011–2012)
- My Little Juan (2013)
- Noah (2010–2011)
- Oka2kat (2012)
- Oki Doki Doc (1993–2000)
- On the Wings of Love (2015–2016)
- Pahina (2000–2001)
- Panday (2005)
- Pangako Sa 'Yo (original) (2000–2002)
- Pangako sa 'Yo (remake) (2015–2016)
- Pieta (2008-2009)
- Precious Hearts Romances Presents
    - Alyna (2010–2011)
    - Ang Lalaking Nagmahal Sa Akin (2009)
    - Bud Brothers (2009)
    - Impostor (2010)
    - Hiyas (2012)
    - My Cheating Heart (2009-2010)
    - Somewhere in My Heart (2009)
  - Quikilig: Ma-iikling Kwento ng Pag-ibig
    - Lumang P1so para sa Puso (2010)
- Princess and I (2012–2013)
- Princess Sarah (2007)
- Qpids (2005)
- Recuerdo de Amor (2001–2003)
- Rosalka (2010)
- Rounin (2007)
- Sa Dulo ng Walang Hanggan (2001–2003)
- Sa Sandaling Kailangan Mo Ako (1998–1999)
- Saan Ka Man Naroroon (1999–2001)
- Sarah the Teen Princess (2004)
- Showbiz Lingo (1992-1999)
- Sineserye Presents
  - Florinda (2009)
  - Hiram na Mukha (2007)
  - Maligno (2008)
  - Patayin sa Sindak si Barbara (2008)
- Star Drama Theater Presents (1993–2001)
- Stars on Stars (2023–present)
- Spirits (2004–2005)
- Super Inggo (2006–2007)
- Tabing Ilog (1999–2003)
- Teysi (2003-2004)
- That's My Doc (2007–2008)
- The Buzz Classics (1999–2015)
- Tonight with Boy Abunda Classics (2015–2020)
- Vietnam Rose (2005–2006)
- Walang Iwanan (2015)
- Walang Kapalit (2007)
- Wansapanataym (1997–2005)
- Whattamen (2001–2004)
- Y Speak (season 1) (2004–2010)

== Specials ==
- Dolphy: Song and Dance Man (December 16, 2012)
- Whattamen Reunited (March 24, 2013)
- Nova's Star: Ilaw ng Komedya (April 28, 2013)
- Edgar Mortiz: Goin' for Gold (May 26, 2013)
- Judy Ann Santos: Her Royal Journey on TV (June 16, 2013)
- Dolphy: Hari ng Komedya (July 7, 2013)
- Bea Alonzo: Beyond Beauty (August 25, 2013)
- Angelica Panganiban: Soaring High (September 29, 2013)
- The Rise of Dawn (October 27, 2013)
- Piolo Pascual: His Miracle Life (November 24, 2013)
- Kapamilya Throwback Christmas: Mga Awit ng Pasko (December 22, 2013)
- 2014 ABS-CBN's Countdown to Chinese New Year (January 30, 2014)
- Annestoppable (February 23, 2014)
- Meteor Fever 4ever (March 30, 2014)
- Limang DICKada (May 25, 2014)
- Ryan Ryan Musikahan: Home For Christmas (December 14, 2014)
- Ryan Ryan Musikahan: Piyano at Gitara (August 15, 2015)
- Ryan Ryan Musikahan: Christmas From the Heart (December 5, 2015)
- Ryan Ryan Musikahan: Para Sa Bayan (June 11, 2016)
- Salubong 2017: The ABS-CBN News New Year Countdown (January 1, 2017)
- Pantawid ng Pag-ibig: At Home Together Concert (March 22, 2020) (together with ABS-CBN Channel 2, S+A, ANC, DZMM Radyo Patrol 630, DZMM Teleradyo, Asianovela Channel, Metro Channel, MOR Philippines, iWant, TFC, and Myx)
- Kapit-Bisig Week (June 27 to July 3, 2020) (special preview from 8 selected programs from ABS-CBN are currently aired on Kapamilya Channel)
- Napapanahong Bayani: A Gawad Genny Lopez Jr.’s Bayaning Pilipino Special (August 8 and 9, 2020)
- La Vida Lena: 2 Week Catch-Up Marathon (August 15 to 29, 2021)
- 8th Entertainment Editors' Choice Awards (July 27, 2025)
- Love, Joy, Hope: The ABS-CBN Christmas Special 2025 (December 20 and 21, 2025)

== See also ==
- List of programs broadcast by ABS-CBN
- List of Kapamilya Channel original programming
- List of A2Z original programming
- List of All TV original programming
- List of programs broadcast by Metro Channel
- List of ABS-CBN Studios original drama series
- List of Philippine television shows
