= Princess Ryan =

Filipina-Irish actress

- Born: Princess Alejandria Ryan; May 26, 1989 (age 37); Maasin City, Southern Leyte
- Occupation: Actress
- Years active: 2006–2012

Princess Ryan (born May 26, 1989) is a former Filipina-Irish TV personality. She was a contact star with ABS-CBN and Star Magic.

== Early life ==
Ryan was born in Maasin, Leyte to an Irish father and a Filipina mother. She was raised there until her elementary years, when they moved to Manila.

== Career ==
Ryan started modeling at a young age. She became a beauty contestant in a segment of the then noontime show, Magandang Tanghali Bayan. Although she didn't win, she was signed by Johnny Manahan. She was introduced to the public as part of Star Magic's Star Circle Batch 13. Her first TV show was on Bora. Star Magic then formed a girl group, Koolchx, that included her, Malaya Lewandowski, Niña Dolino, Cassandra Ponti, and two other girls. They performed on ASAP until the group split. In 2008, she was part of the original cast of the comedy gag show Banana Split. She also appeared on Love Spell, Eva Fonda, Your Song, and Precious Hearts Romances Presents until 2010.

In 2010 Ryan did not renew her contract with ABS-CBN, and joined TV5, appearing on Lokomoko U and P.O.5. She had previously guest starred on TV5's Lipgloss for one season. She then moved to the US to raise her daughter.

== Personal life and activism ==
Ryan has a daughter. She was previously in a relationship with Alwyn Uytingco for two years. She also has a sister, Genesis, who is a performer and auditioned for the second season of The Voice Philippines.

In 2018, she founded Kidz Groove Neurodiversity Mission, a dance production and workshop for kids with disabilities. In 2024, Ryan was crowned as Model Mom Universe for her advocacy relating to motherhood.

== Filmography ==
=== Television ===
Year	Title	Role
2005	Bora	
2008	Lipgloss	Sarah Madison
2008	Love Spell: Ellay Enchanted	
2008	Eva Fonda	Rosanna Paredes/Osang
2008–2010	Banana Split	Herself
2009	Your Song Presents: Someone To Love	Brenda
2009	Precious Hearts Romances Presents: Somewhere In My Heart	Denise
2010	Maalaala Mo Kaya: Dancing Shoes	Herbert
2010	Lokomoko U	Herself
2010	Midnight DJ: Ang Pagbabalik ng Babae sa Balete Drive	Sasha
2010–2011	P.O.5	Performer
2012	It's Showtime	Guest Juror
