= Hiram na Mukha =

Hiram na Mukha may refer to:

- Hiram na Mukha (film), a 1992 Filipino film
- Hiram na Mukha (TV series), a Filipino TV series based on the film
- Hiram na Mukha (1952 film), a Sampaguita Pictures film with Fred Montilla
