= List of Parasite Island episodes =

Parasite Island is a 2019 Philippine drama television series starring Rafael Rosell, Bernard Palanca, Michael Flores, Bianca Manalo, Ria Atayde and Desiree del Valle. The series premiered on ABS-CBN's Yes Weekend! Sunday block from September 8 to December 1, 2019, replacing Hiwaga ng Kambat.

== Series overview ==
Season	Episodes	Originally released	
Season	Episodes	First released	Last released
1	13	September 8, 2019	December 1, 2019

== Episodes ==
=== Season 1 ===
No. overall	No. in season	Title	Original release date	Kantar Media (nationwide)	AGB Nielsen (NUTAM People)
1	1	"Pilot"	September 8, 2019	30.0%	TBA
2	2	"Lindol (transl. earthquake)"	September 15, 2019	30.7%	TBA
3	3	"Pamana (transl. heritage)"	September 22, 2019	29.4%	TBA
4	4	"Pag-atake (transl. attack)"	September 29, 2019	31.6%	TBA
5	5	"Gintong Linta (transl. golden leech)"	October 6, 2019	28.7%	TBA
6	6	"Tuklas (transl. discovery)"	October 13, 2019	28.7%	11.3%
7	7	"Paglikas (transl. evacuation)"	October 20, 2019	29.6%	TBA
8	8	"Paglusob (transl. invasion)"	October 27, 2019	28.1%	11.0%
9	9	"Pagtatapat (transl. confession)"	November 3, 2019	31.6%	12.6%
10	10	"Kapatawaran (transl. forgiveness)"	November 10, 2019	26.6%	10.6%
11	11	"Pagsalakay (transl. invasion)"	November 17, 2019	24.9%	10.8%
12	12	"Kabayaran (transl. compensation)"	November 24, 2019	25.9%	10.7%
13	13	"Pagsasakripisyo (transl. sacrifice)"	December 1, 2019	27.0%	11.3%
