= Palimos ng Pag-ibig =

Palimos ng Pag-ibig may refer to:

- Palimos ng Pag-ibig (film) - original 1985 Filipino film
- Palimos ng Pag-ibig (TV series) - a Filipino TV series based on the film
