= Natutulog Pa ang Diyos =

1988 drama film by Lino Brocka

- Directed by: Lino Brocka
- Screenplay by: Orlando R. Nadres; Gina Marissa Tagasa-Gil
- Story by: Ruben R. Marcelino
- Based on: Natutulog Pa ang Diyos by Ruben Marcelino
- Produced by: Robbie Tan
- Starring: Lorna Tolentino; Ricky Davao; Gary Valenciano
- Cinematography: J.R. Peterman
- Edited by: Augusto Salvador
- Music by: Nonong Buencamino; Jose Bartolome
- Production company: Seiko Films
- Distributed by: Seiko Films
- Release date: September 22, 1988
- Running time: 118 minutes
- Country: Philippines
- Language: Filipino

Natutulog Pa ang Diyos (English: "God is Still Sleeping") is a 1988 Philippine drama film directed by Lino Brocka from a screenplay written by Orlando R. Nadres and Gina Marissa Tagasa-Gil, based on the original novel of the same name by Ruben R. Marcelino. The film stars Lorna Tolentino, Ricky Davao, and Gary Valenciano, with the supporting cast including Marita Zobel, Gina Pareño, and Dante Rivero.

The film, produced and distributed by Seiko Films, was theatrically released on September 22, 1988. In 2007, the film was remade into a television drama series as Natutulog Ba ang Diyos? by ABS-CBN as the fourth installment of Sineserye Presents and stars Roxanne Guinoo as Gillian, Jake Cuenca as Andrew, and Joross Gamboa as Mark.

== Plot ==
Everyone notices how different Andrew Velasco (Ricky Davao) and Gillian Ramírez (Lorna Tolentino) look from their respective sets of parents, but little else is made of it. More surprisingly, both had never felt close to their families growing up. Instead, Gillian becomes more attached to Andrew's parents, (Ricky Belmonte and Marita Zobel), while Andrew feels more drawn to Gillian's parents, Bernardo (Dante Rivero) and Patria (Gina Pareño) Ramírez.

Little do most suspect that this is because Andrew and Gillian had been switched at birth. Andrew's biological father, Bernardo, is a poor chauffeur who decides his and Patria's child will have a better life with the Velascos, his rich employers. So, he ensures only they know he had exchanged the two infants after both mothers gave birth in a provincial hospital. No amount of pleading by Patria could make Bernardo change his mind, so she projects her frustrations on Gillian by abusing the girl. The latter finds comfort in Andrew's mother, Rose (who is her real mother), and later a rich suitor named Mark Vilchez (Gary Valenciano). Jealous of Gillian's newfound attention, Andrew decides to force himself on her, which eventually reveals the truth behind their parentage.

== Cast and characters ==
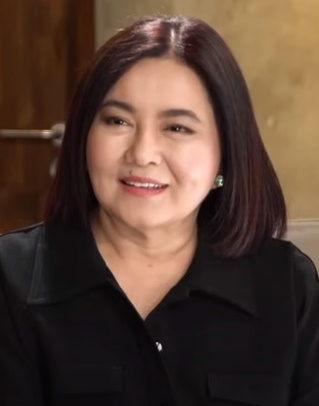
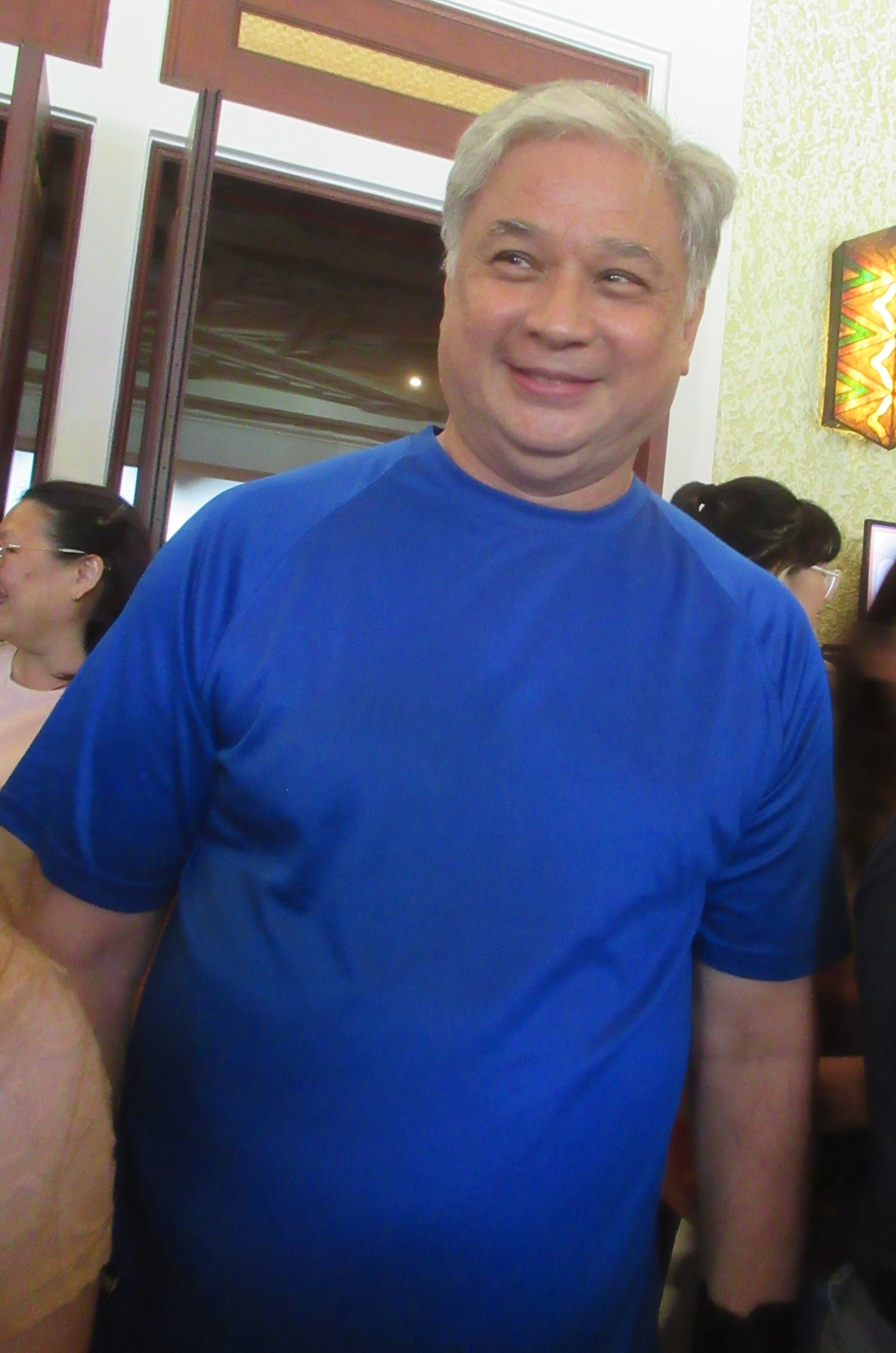
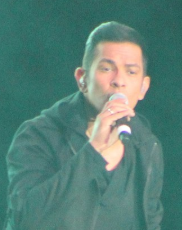
Lorna Tolentino, Ricky Davao, and Gary Valenciano (the former two pictured in 2023, while the latter pictured in 2014) respectively played the roles of Gillian, Andrew, and Mark.
- Lorna Tolentino as Gillian Ramírez: The biological daughter of Mike and Rose, who is the adopted child of Patria and Bernardo
  - Kenken Lacia as young Gillian
- Ricky Davao as Andrew Velasco: The biological son of Patria and Bernardo, who is the adopted child of Mike and Rose
  - Billy Crawford as young Andrew
- Gary Valenciano as Mark Vilchez
- Marita Zobel as Rose Velasco
- Gina Pareño as Patria Ramirez
- Ricky Belmonte as Mike Velasco
- Dante Rivero as Bernardo Ramirez
- Tina Godínez as Lani Ramírez: Gillian's selfish younger sister
- Michael Locsín as Boy Ramírez: Gillian's supportive younger brother

== Release ==
Produced and distributed by Seiko Films, it was theatrically released on September 22, 1988, with its initial theatrical run opening in 44 theaters across the National Capital Region and its neighboring provinces.

== Reception ==
=== Accolades ===
Year	Award-Giving Body	Category	Recipient	Result	Ref(s)
1989	Gawad Urian Awards	Best Actress	Lorna Tolentino	Nominated	
