= List of The Haunted episodes =

The Haunted is a 2019 Philippine horror drama television series starring Jake Cuenca, Shaina Magdayao, Denise Laurel, and Queenzy Calma. The series premiered on ABS-CBN's Yes Weekend! Sunday block and worldwide via The Filipino Channel from December 8, 2019 to February 9, 2020, replacing Parasite Island.

== Series overview ==
Season	Episodes	Originally released	
Season	Episodes	First released	Last released
1	10	December 8, 2019	February 9, 2020

== Episodes ==
=== Season 1 ===
No. overall	No. in season	Title	Original release date	Kantar Media (Nationwide)	AGB Nielsen (NUTAM People)
1	1	"The Haunted House"	December 8, 2019	14.9%	8.3%
2	2	"Haunted by the Past"	December 15, 2019	15.4%	7.6%
3	3	"Haunted Christmas"	December 22, 2019	15.0%	TBA
4	4	"Haunted Secrets"	December 29, 2019	15.3%	TBA
5	5	"A Haunted New Year"	January 5, 2020	16.1%	7.7%
6	6	"The Haunted Child"	January 12, 2020	14.7%	5.6%
7	7	"The Haunted Man"	January 19, 2020	14.6%	6.4%
8	8	"The Haunted and The Dead"	January 26, 2020	13.5%	6.0%
9	9	"The Haunted Suspect"	February 2, 2020	14.2%	6.4%
10	10	"The Haunted Revelation"	February 9, 2020	24.0%	11.8%
