= Desiree del Valle =

Filipino actress

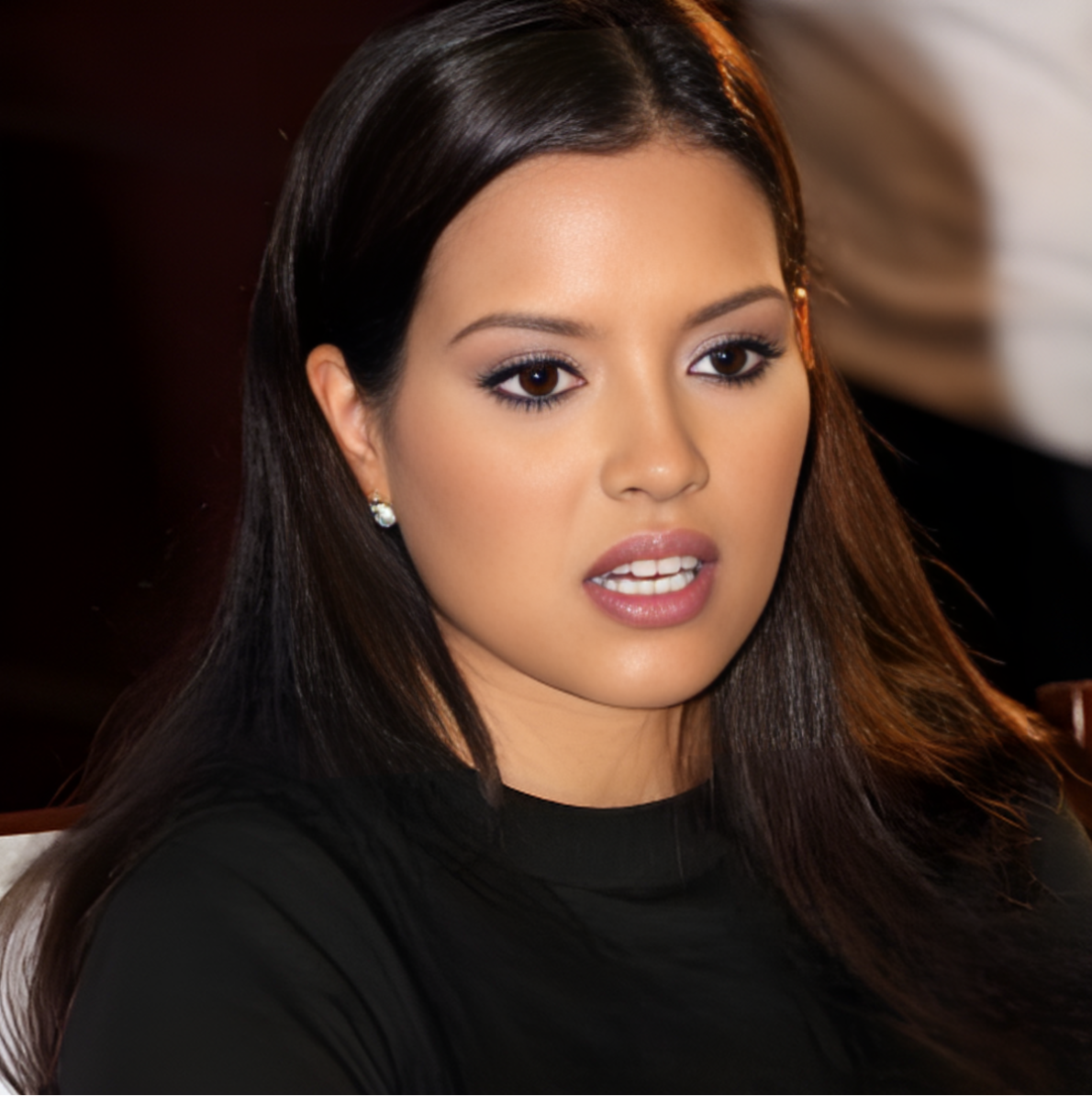
- Born: Desirée Lois del Valle Dunham; May 28, 1982 (age 44); Manila, Philippines
- Occupation: Actress
- Years active: 1998–present
- Agents: Star Magic (1998–2006; 2007–2024); GMA Network (2006–2007; 2024–present); TV5 (2008–2011; 2021–present); ALLTV2 (2024–present)
- Spouse: Boom Labrusca (m. 2018)
- Children: 1 son

Desirée Lois del Valle Dunham-Labrusca (born May 28, 1982), better known by her screen name Desiree del Valle, is a Filipino-American actress.

After joining ABS-CBN's Star Magic in 1998, she had her breakout role in the weekly television drama Tabing Ilog (1999–2003). Since then, she has appeared in several television series and films from both ABS-CBN and GMA Network in supporting roles.

== Early life ==
Del Valle was born on May 28, 1982 from an Irish American father named Clois H. Dunham and a Filipino mother Lourdes del Valle from Lopez, Quezon.

== Career ==
She started her career and was launched in 1998 through ABS-CBN's training subsidiary, Star Magic (Batch 7).

In 2006, she transferred to GMA Network and starred as Giovanna Guillermo-Roxas in the final installment of Now and Forever but has since returned to ABS-CBN.

From 1999 to 2003, she had a giant impact on viewers as Corrine on Tabing Ilog, a weekend TV drama that boosted the careers of many of today stars. She would portray the role of a protagonist antagonist in the hit drama, Bituin from 2002 to 2003 and play the villain Francine, an antagonist to Kristine Hermosa's character in Sana'y Wala Nang Wakas.

== Personal life ==
Del Valle married her FlordeLiza co-star Boom Labrusca January 2018 at South Lake Tahoe, California. The couple has a son, born in 2021.

== Filmography ==
=== Film ===
| Year | Title | Role | Notes | Source |
|---|---|---|---|---|
| 1999 | Oo Na, Mahal Na Kung Mahal | Bearwin's girl 2 | | |
| 2001 | Trip | Ola | | |
| 2004 | Bcuz of U | Stella | | |
| 2005 | Tuli | Daisy | | |
| 2007 | Ouija | Lucy | | |
| 2008 | When Love Begins | Raisa | | |
| 2010 | Till My Heartaches End | Lea | | |
| 2016 | The Achy Breaky Hearts | Corrine | | |
| 2018 | Sin Island | Meg | | |
| 2018 | Kahit Ayaw Mo Na | Edlyn | | |
| 2024 | A Journey | Juana Korrinne | | |

=== Television ===
| Year | Title | Role | Notes | Source |
|---|---|---|---|---|
| 1998 | Wansapanataym | | Episode: "Ang Itlog... Bow!"; Credited as Desiree Dunham | |
| 1998–2000 | Cyberkada | Herself | | |
| 1998–1999 | Gimik | Dette Zubiri | | |
| 1999–2003 | Tabing Ilog | Corrinne Ledesma | | |
| 2001-2002 | Attagirl | Charly | | |
| 2001 | !Oka Tokat | Minerva Romulo | Episode: Balate Drive | |
| 2002–2003 | Bituin | Bernadette Gaston | | |
| 2003 | Sana'y Wala Nang Wakas | Francine | | |
| 2004 | Wansapanataym | Tekla | Episode: "Magic Soap" | |
| 2004 | Krystala | Donna Roxas / Luminax | | |
| 2005 | MTB: Ang Saya Saya | Herself - Judge | Segment: "TV Idol UR D Man" | |
| 2005 | Bora | | | |
| 2005 | Kampanerang Kuba | Veronica Saavedra / Agatha | | |
| 2006 | Now and Forever: Dangal | Giovanna Roxas | | |
| 2006 | Daddy Di Do Du | Angie | | |
| 2006 | Atlantika | Azita | | |
| 2006-2007 | Magpakailanman | Minda Pascual/Vicky | Episode: "The Minda Pascual Story & The Liza Dela Cruz Story" | |
| 2007 | Mga Kuwento ni Lola Basyang | Princess Lucinda | Episode: "Ang Mahiwagang Kuba" | |
| 2007 | Sineserye Presents: Palimos ng Pag-ibig | Verna | | |
| 2007 | Margarita | Duday | | |
| 2007 | Ysabella | Cristina Mancado | | |
| 2008 | Palos | Arianna Kiev | | |
| 2008–2011 | Midnight DJ | Andrea | | |
| 2009 | Tayong Dalawa | Young Rita "Lola Gets" Dionisio | | |
| 2009 | Jim Fernandez's Kambal Sa Uma | Young Celeste Miranda-Ledesma | | |
| 2009 | The Wedding | Oona | | |
| 2009–2010 | May Bukas Pa | Clautilde "Tilde" Magdayo | | |
| 2010 | Kung Ako Ikaw | Herself | | |
| 2010 | Your Song Presents: Love Me, Love You | Stephanie | | |
| 2010 | Maalaala Mo Kaya | Malou | Episode: "Litrato" | |
| 2010 | Maalaala Mo Kaya | Amy | Episode: "Bibliya" | |
| 2010–2011 | Emil Cruz Jr.'s Mara Clara | Christina Borres | | |
| 2011 | Maalaala Mo Kaya | Romilla | Episode: "Tindahan" | |
| 2011 | Maalaala Mo Kaya | Cherry | Episode: "Passbook" | |
| 2011–2012 | Nasaan Ka, Elisa? | Detective Giselle Santillian | | |
| 2012–2013 | Aryana | Neptuna | | |
| 2013 | My Little Juan | Ruth Balmaceda | | |
| 2013–2014 | Annaliza | Shirley Cruz-Andres | | |
| 2013 | Maalaala Mo Kaya | Jane | Episode: "Altar" | |
| 2014 | Wansapanataym | Sally | Episode: "Si Lulu At Si Lily Liit" | |
| 2014 | Maalaala Mo Kaya | Anita | Episode: "Tutong" | |
| 2015 | Ipaglaban Mo! | Lisa | Episode: "Ako Ang Iyong Ina" | |
| 2015 | FlordeLiza | Elizabeth "Beth" Perez-Maristela | | |
| 2015 | Bridges of Love | Young Marilen Mendoza-Nakpil | | |
| 2016 | We Will Survive | Jessica | | |
| 2016 | Maalaala Mo Kaya | Maria | Episode: "Family Picture" | |
| 2016–2017 | FPJ's Ang Probinsyano | Monica Montenegro | | |
| 2017–2018 | La Luna Sangre | Summer Sison | | |
| 2017 | The Promise of Forever | Grace Madrid | | |
| 2017 | Maalaala Mo Kaya | Myrna Calag | Episode: "Tulay" | |
| 2018 | Ipaglaban Mo! | Pam Evangelista | Episode: "Paniniwala" | |
| 2018 | Wansapanataym | Elissa | Episode: "Ofishially Yours" | |
| 2018 | Asintado | Natasha Ojeda-Calderon | | |
| 2019 | Ipaglaban Mo! | Jessica | Episode: "Apelyido" | |
| 2019 | Parasite Island | Queenie | | |
| 2020–2021 | Ang sa Iyo ay Akin | Sonya Villarosa-Escobar | | |
| 2021 | Paano ang Pangako? | Natalie Wilson | | |
| 2023–2024 | Senior High | Sasha M. Aguerro | | |
| 2025 | Mga Batang Riles | Scarlett Riego-Victor | | |
| 2026 | The Loyalty Game | Natalie Saguil | | |

=== Microdrama ===
| Year | Title | Role | Notes | Source |
|---|---|---|---|---|
| TBA | Dead Girl Walking | | | |

== Awards and nominations ==
| Year | Award giving body | Category | Nominated work | Results |
|---|---|---|---|---|
| 2000 | PMPC Star Awards for Television | Teen Star of the Night | —N/a | Won |
