= May Minamahal =

May Minamahal may refer to:

- May Minamahal (film), a 1993 Filipino film
- May Minamahal (TV series), a Filipino TV series based on the film
