= Hiram na Mukha (film) =

1992 drama film by Joel C. Lamangan

- Home video sleeve
- Directed by: Joel C. Lamangan
- Screenplay by: Ronaldo C. Carballo; Amado Lacuesta Jr.
- Story by: Pablo S. Gomez
- Based on: Hiram na Mukha by Pablo S. Gomez
- Produced by: Vic R. del Rosario Jr.; William C. Leary
- Starring: Nanette Medved; Christopher de Leon; Cesar Montano
- Cinematography: Charlie Peralta
- Edited by: George Jarlego
- Music by: Vehnee Saturno
- Production company: Viva Films
- Release date: July 15, 1992
- Running time: 108 minutes
- Country: Philippines
- Language: Filipino

Hiram na Mukha (transl. The Borrowed Face) is a 1992 Filipino drama film directed by Joel Lamangan from a screenplay written by Ronaldo C. Carballo and Amado Lacuesta Jr., based on the komiks story of the same name written by Pablo S. Gomez. The film stars Nanette Medved, Christopher de Leon, and Cesar Montano in his first ever starring role in a Viva Films production.

In 2007, the film was remade into a television drama series of the same name by ABS-CBN as the second installment of Sineserye Presents and starred Heart Evangelista, Geoff Eigenmann, and TJ Trinidad.

== Plot ==
Carissa, who lives with her mother Timotea and grandmother Emma, is often a subject of ridicule in their community, particularly by their Kapitana and her daughter Shirley, because of the mother and daughter's appearances. Some say they are causing bad luck and are called "witches". This makes Carissa hurt so badly because of poverty and her face. However, they had a kind neighbor named Mendez, who came from a wealthy family and was searching for his godfather, Dr. Hugo Roldan, a famous plastic surgeon who was researching how to create a perfect and beautiful woman.

== Cast of characters ==
- Nanette Medved as Carissa / Alicia
- Christopher de Leon as Dr. Hugo Roldan
- Cesar Montano as Mendez
- Maritoni Fernandez as Morita
- Daria Ramirez as Timotea
- Dante Rivero as Kardo
- Caridad Sanchez as Lola Emma
- Cherry Pie Picache as Shirley
- Rosemarie Gil as Tita Rose
- Lucita Soriano as Aling Azon
- Lorli Villanueva as Kapitana
- Romeo Rivera as Miguel
- Celso Ad Castillo as Recruiter
- Orestes Ojeda as Dr. Ruben Victorino
- Melissa Mendez as Margot Victorino

== Komiks origin ==
Hiram na Mukha was first serialized in komiks before being adapted into a film. Pablo S. Gomez was the creator and writer of the story. However, all the rights were transferred to Viva Films.

== Music ==
Ella Mae Saison performed the movie's theme song, "Hiram na Sandali".

== Reception ==
=== Accolades ===
Award	Category	Nominee(s)	Result	Ref.
Young Critics Circle
Young Critics Circle	Best Achievement in Sound and Aural Orchestration	Vehnee Saturno (musical director); Vic Macamay (sound engineer)	Won	
Young Critics Circle	Best Achievement in Cinematography and Visual Design	Charlie Peralta (cinematographer); Benjie De Guzman (production designer)	Nominated	
Young Critics Circle	Best Performance by Male or Female, Adult or Child, Individual or Ensemble in Leading or Supporting Role	Nanette Medved	Nominated	

== See also ==
- Hiram na Mukha (TV series)
