= Palimos ng Pag-ibig (film) =

1986 drama film by Eddie Garcia

- Palimos ng Pag-ibig VCD cover, released by Viva Video in the Philippines
- Directed by: Eddie Garcia
- Screenplay by: Raquel Villavicencio
- Story by: Nerissa G. Cabral
- Based on: The Baby Maker by James Bridges; Palimos ng Pag-ibig by Nerissa G. Cabral
- Produced by: Vic R. del Rosario Jr.
- Starring: Vilma Santos; Edu Manzano; Dina Bonnevie
- Cinematography: Joe Batac Jr.
- Edited by: Ike Jarlego Jr.
- Music by: George Canseco
- Production company: Viva Films
- Distributed by: Viva Films
- Release date: May 14, 1986
- Running time: 126 minutes
- Country: Philippines
- Language: Filipino

Palimos ng Pag-ibig (lit. 'Begging for Love') is a 1986 Filipino drama film directed by Eddie Garcia from a screenplay written by Raquel Villavicencio, which adapted from a comics serial by Nerissa G. Cabral, which in turn based on the 1970 film The Baby Maker. Starring Vilma Santos, Edu Manzano, and Dina Bonnevie, the film follows a couple who wanted to have their own child but things would change when they hire a surrogate.

Produced and distributed by Viva Films, the film was released theatrically on May 14, 1986. In 2007, it was adapted into a teleserye of the same title, serving as the first installment of ABS-CBN's Sineserye Presents.

== Plot ==
On the outside, married couple Fina (Santos) and Rodel (Manzano) Alcaraz appear to be a match made in heaven, but behind the thick walls of their home, their relationship is on the verge of crumbling. Despite being relatively affluent, the couple is empty as they are childless, for any attempt to conceive might prove fatal to Fina due to her condition. In an act of desperation, Rodel takes matters into his own hands and seeks the services of a surrogate, Ditas (Bonnevie).

The plan goes awry when Rodel becomes genuinely attracted to the younger and more alluring Ditas. The surrogate, who has lived a destitute life, finds the notion of prosperity equally irresistible. The well-intentioned plan to resuscitate life back into a dying marriage becomes its undoing.

== Cast ==
- Vilma Santos as Fina Alcazar
- Edu Manzano as Rodel Alcazar
- Dina Bonnevie as Ditas Ocampo
- Laurice Guillen as Mitos
- Pepito Rodriguez as Reggie Alcaraz
- Ronald Corveau as Paul
- Cherie Gil as Verna Castillo
- Josephine Estrada
- Tina Loy
- Aurora Yumol
- Vic Ordoñez
- Ernie Sarate
- Encar Benedicto
- Joel Llorca as Reggie (2 years old)
  - Quinet Morato as Reggie (10 months old)
- Rachel Millard as Pearly

== Production ==
Palimos ng Pag-ibig is an adaptation of the 1971 film The Baby Maker, co-written and directed by James Bridges. It was first serialized in Komiks by Nerissa Cabral before it was adapted for film.

== Home media ==
The film was re-released on video by Viva Video in early 1999.

== TV adaptation ==
In 2007, ABS-CBN remade the film into a TV series as the first installment of Sineserye Presents. It stars Kristine Hermosa as Ditas, Diether Ocampo as Rodel and Rica Peralejo as Fina.

== In popular culture ==
The film was the origin of the line, "Para kang karenderiáng bukás sa lahát ng gustong kumain!" ("You're like an eatery open to anyone who wants to eat!"). The line refers to a character accusing another of engaging in prostitution.
