= Hiram na Mukha (TV series) =

2007 Philippine television drama series

- Title card
- Genre: Soap opera; Romance
- Created by: ABS-CBN Studios
- Based on: Hiram na Mukha by Joel Lamangan; Hiram na Mukha by Pablo S. Gomez
- Directed by: Eric Salud; Trina Dayrit
- Starring: Heart Evangelista; Geoff Eigenman; TJ Trinidad
- Theme music composer: Vince Katinday
- Ending theme: "Ngiti" by Ronnie Liang
- Country of origin: Philippines
- Original language: Filipino
- No. of episodes: 29

Production
- Executive producer: Roldeo T. Endrinal
- Running time: 30 minutes
- Production company: Dreamscape Entertainment

Original release
- Network: ABS-CBN
- Release: April 23 – June 1, 2007

Related
- Palimos ng Pag-ibig; May Minamahal

Hiram na Mukha (transl. Borrowed Face) is a 2007 Philippine television drama series broadcast by ABS-CBN. Based on a 1992 Philippine film of the same title, the series is the second instalment of Sineserye Presents. Directed by Eric Salud and Trina Dayrit, it stars Heart Evangelista, TJ Trinidad and Geoff Eigenmann. It aired on the network's Primetime Bida line up and worldwide on TFC from April 23 to June 1, 2007, replacing Palimos ng Pag-ibig and was replaced by May Minamahal.

== Komiks Origin ==
Hiram na Mukha was first serialized in Komiks before it was translated in the big screen. Pablo S. Gomez was the creator and writer of the story. However, all the rights of the story were already transferred to Viva Films.

== Plot ==
Carissa is born with a face resembling a monkey. All her life, she and her disfigured family experienced persecution from all the people around her because she is branded as the town jinx. She and her family tried to run away but ended up as a sideshow in a carnival. She was mistreated by everyone and became an object of jokes as well as of disgust. But the happy-go-lucky guy, Mendez is different. Mendez befriended the disfigured Carissa and saw what others failed to see, her beautiful heart. There came a time that Mendez ultimately fell in love with "the monkey-girl". Meanwhile, Alicia has a bad feeling that there's something not right in her own house. The famous model has a feeling that her husband, the famous plastic surgeon, Hugo Roldan, is having an affair with her own best friend, Morita. She caught him red-handed and decided to go away. Hugo tried to beg for mercy so she would not go but she still left. Tragically, Alicia's flight crashed in the sea and she was one of the casualties. They never found her body and Hugo is left with nothing but remorse and guilt. If only he could bring back the wife he failed to love with all his heart. That is when he found the half-dead Carissa lying in the streets. Mendez left for work in an island resort to earn money for him and Carissa. While he is away, Shirley, the girl who also likes Mendez, forged his hand writing making Carissa believe that he left her for good. Then an epidemic spread across town and the poor Carissa was stoned by a mob thinking she is the jinx that brought the epidemic. Mendez came back for Carissa but they told him that Carissa died in an accident, then showed to him a fake grave. Now with nothing left in her heart but vengeance, Carissa agrees to be Hugo's test patient for a new revolutionary surgical procedure that could copy another person's face. Carissa studied manners, etiquette, fashion and everything about the high society. Carissa took the identity of Alicia. She is now what Alicia was, Hugo's "wife" and a goddess in the fashion industry. She agreed to this arrangement because of 2 reasons; to show gratitude to Hugo and to exact revenge on everyone who made her suffer. She was surprised that Alicia owned a resort and her bodyguard is Mendez. She went to the people that caused her pain and showed Mendez how she made them suffer. With the change of her face, her heart also changed. But still, Mendez could not explain why he is falling for a "horrible" woman like "Alicia". She was supposed to punish him but ended up falling for him even more. She can't bear her feelings anymore now that she knows what Shirley actually did. She told everything to Mendez and the lovers picked up where they left off. They had an "affair" but she is afraid what would Hugo do now that she saw Hugo's evil side. She then learns about the dark secrets of the face she now possess. Secrets that could ruin Hugo and bring back to Mendez what was stolen from him. Mendez's father, Dr. Pedroza was a famous plastic surgeon who created the procedure. But young, ambitious doctor Hugo stole the plan then made it as his own, destroying Dr. Pedroza's reputation. He then seduced Mrs. Pedroza which led to the heart attack and death of Dr. Pedroza, leaving the poor kid, Mendez with nothing that's why he grew up in the streets. Hugo then experimented on countless women like Carissa but ended up with dead patients including Carissa's sister. Now, Carissa just wants to leave with Mendez and hatched a plan to take Hugo's wealth that is really for Mendez. But will their plan prevail? Now that Hugo has also a plan as diabolical as their own.

== Cast and characters ==
=== Main cast ===
- Heart Evangelista as Carissa De Leon / Alicia Puyat-Roldan
  - Carissa de Leon - the monkey-like woman, who goes under rough treatment by the people around her, who can't help but judge her because of her seemingly unacceptable features. She has low self-esteem, and tends to wear dark-colored outfits to hide herself from other people. Despite that, she has a pure heart, and loves Mendez very much.
  - Alicia Roldan - the original Alicia is a beautiful woman with an equally beautiful heart. She was befriended by Morita only to find out that Morita is trying to seduce her husband. She leaves the country with the thought that her husband betrayed her but suddenly death comes her way.
    The newly makeovered Carissa, who, thanks to the wonders of Science, is given a brand new face, patterned after Dr. Hugo's late wife, Alicia. The cosmetic surgeon Hugo Roldan not only gave her a brand new face, and taught her manners as well. Soon, she becomes known because of her beauty, and will choose bright-colored outfits over dark ones, to call attention to herself. Wants to exact revenge to all the people who made her life a living hell. But will all of these things make her happy?
- Geoff Eigenmann as Mendez Pedrosa - the son of the famous Dr. Simon Pedrosa, who built the biggest cosmetic hospital in Asia. Unfortunately, Dr. Pedrosa forgoes his business the minute his wife left him, and eventually dies of a heart attack, leaving his son, Mendez, nothing. This streetsmart and happy go lucky guy learned to live without his father's riches, and his life changes forever when he meets Carissa.
- TJ Trinidad as Dr. Hugo Roldan - Dr. Simon Pedrosa's protégé, whose only goal in life is to rake cash and fame, so he's prone to unethical and experimental surgeries. When Dr. Pedrosa died, Hugo cheated his papers and stole Dr. Pedrosa's business, leaving Dr. Pedrosa's son Mendez, with nothing. He really pants after beauty, and misses his late wife very much, so much that he "created" another her but as we know beauty alone is not the foundation of love.

=== Supporting cast ===
- Katya Santos as Morita Ponce - Rose's younger sister. She's always had her eyes on Hugo, and thinks that she can now have him to herself now that his wife had died. Vain and selfish, she never hesitates to speak her mind on things. Shocked to see the new "Alicia" and will try to get her out of the picture for good.
- Cherry Pie Picache as Rose Ponce - the ambitious and greedy older cousin of Alicia, Hugo's late wife. She only craves for power and money, that's why she keeps latching on to Dr. Hugo Roldan, who can't let her go because she knows a secret about him that he can't afford to spill.
- Eva Darren as Aling Azon - who works at the fair Carissa and her mother was in. Soon, she takes Carissa under her roof, and eventually becomes the voice of reason of Alicia.
- Shamaine Centenera-Buencamino as Timotea De Leon - mother of Carissa and Candelaria, she also has a monke-liked faced like her daughters.
- Marissa Delgado as Kapitana - Captain of barangay(community), where Carissa lives in. She treats Carissa and her mother like animals. Victim of "Alicia's" revenge.
- Anna Leah Javier as Shirley - daughter of the Kapitana, also falls in love with Mendez, made Carissa's life a living hell but not until "Alicia" comes in.
- Justine de Leon as Gino - brother of Shirley and son of the Kapitana, tried to rape Carissa.
- Matutina as Yaya - maid of the Roldans
- Gail Lardizabal as Hazel Roldan - Younger Sister of Hugo
- JE Sison as Cardo - co-worker of Mendez in the Beach Resort.

== See also ==
- Bakekang - a similar series about an ugly protagonist
- Kampanerang Kuba - another similar series about an ugly protagonist
- Hiram na Mukha - the original film over which the series was based on
- List of programs broadcast by ABS-CBN
- Sineserye Presents
