= Rosalka =

Philippine television series

- Title card
- Genre: Drama; Fantasy; Horror
- Created by: ABS-CBN Studios
- Directed by: Jeffrey R. Jeturian; Rechie A. Del Carmen; Jerry Lopez Sineneng; Mae Czarina Cruz
- Starring: Empress Schuck; Felix Roco; Matt Evans
- Theme music composer: Ernie Dela Peña; Charo Unite
- Opening theme: "Lupa" by Erik Santos
- Country of origin: Philippines
- Original language: Filipino
- No. of episodes: 115

Production
- Executive producers: Carlo Katigbak; Cory Vidanes; Laurenti Dyogi; Malou Santos; Ginny Monteagudo-Ocampo
- Producer: Sackey Prince Pendatun
- Running time: 35 minutes
- Production company: Star Creatives

Original release
- Network: ABS-CBN
- Release: May 17 – October 22, 2010

Rosalka is a 2010 Philippine television drama series broadcast by ABS-CBN. Directed by Jeffrey R. Jeturian, Rechie A. Del Carmen, Jerry Lopez Sineneng and Mae Czarina Cruz, it stars Empress Schuck, Matt Evans and Felix Roco. It aired on the network's Hapontastic line up and worldwide on TFC from May 17 to October 22, 2010, replacing Magkano ang Iyong Dangal? and was replaced by Juanita Banana.

== Plot ==
The story revolves around a young lady named Rosa, judged and shunned by the public because of her "horrible" disability—all, except for a man who seems to accept her for who she is. But will their love stand the test of time—and of society, when the mystery of Rosa's disability is made public? Rosa is carrying a monster inside her back that detaches itself every full moon which then transforms Rosa into a beautiful lady. The monster dies at the ending because of saving its and Rosa's mother from Wilfred.

== Cast and characters ==
The cast of Rosalka

=== Main cast ===
- Empress Schuck as Rosa Dimaano / Sophia
- Felix Roco as Jason Sta. Maria
- Matt Evans as Aries Abad

=== Supporting cast ===
- Max Collins as Veronica Dominguez
- Mickey Ferriols as Cecille Dimaano
- Nikki Bacolod as Shane Balbas
- Kier Legaspi as Jhun Dimaano
- Dominic Ochoa as Wilfred Dominguez
- Bernard Palanca as Ramon Sta. Maria
- Maricar de Mesa as Cynthia Dominguez
- Pretty Trisha as Tita Didi / Diana
- DJ Durano as Teddy Jimedez
- Arnold Reyes as Francis Tan
- Mila del Sol as Donya Carmen Sta. Maria

=== Extended cast ===
- Ian Galliguez as Juvy
- Justin Cuyugan as Johnny
- Neil Coleta as Randy
- Enrique Gil as Andrew
- Lloyd Zaragoza as Gaspar
- Paw Diaz as Lucy
- Zeppi Borromeo as Noel
- Cherry Lou as Maya
- Jayssel Lucelo as Ronnie
- Micah Muñoz as Tony
- Missy Maramara as Dixie Jimedez
- Jenny Miller as Marlene

=== Special participation ===
- Barbie Sabino as young Rosa
- Maliksi Morales as young Jason
- Martin del Rosario as young Johnny
- Ina Feleo as Christy

== Launch ==
Rosalka was launched as one of the ABS-CBN's offerings for the 2010, during the ABS-CBN Trade Launch and was announced during the Kapamilya Trade Launch held in Boracay.

== Trivia ==
In Slavic mythology, there is a supernatural creature called "Rusalka" which generally resemble mermaids and nymphs.

== Awards and nominations ==
- 2010 PMPC Star Awards for Television's "Best Daytime-Drama Series"

== See also ==
- List of programs broadcast by ABS-CBN
- List of ABS-CBN Studios original drama series
- List of programs broadcast by Jeepney TV
