= Pablo S. Gomez =

Filipino comic writer (1929-2010)

Pablo Gomez
- Born: Pablo S. Gomez; January 25, 1929; Sampaloc, Manila, Philippines
- Died: December 26, 2010 (aged 81); Sta. Teresita Hospital, Quezon City, Philippines
- Resting place: La Loma Cemetery
- Other names: Pabs, P.S.G.
- Occupations: Writer, novelist, director, scriptwriter

Pablo S. Gomez (January 25, 1929 – December 26, 2010), was one of the top komiks writers in the Philippines. He was also a screenwriter and director. His most popular works include Kurdapya and Petrang Kabayo among others.

== Early life and career ==
Born in Sampaloc, Manila on 25 January 1929, he was the son of Olimpio Gomez and Pacita Salonga. He studied at Legarda Elementary School, Jose Abad Santos High School, National Teachers' College and Ateneo de Manila University.

In 1949, he started his writing career submitting prose works in publications such as Liwayway, Bulaklak, Aliwan, and Sinag-Tala. After that, he started as a proofreader then rose to editor of Ace Publications' serials like Hiwaga Komiks. He was at the same time writing komiks stories for Ace Publications, which was then starting out with only two komiks titles: Pilipino Komiks and Tagalog Klasiks. Some of the stories he created here were signed using his pen name, Carlos Gonda. Apat na Taga, his first komiks novel, was such an instant hit that movie giant Sampaguita Pictures turned it into a movie in 1953.

After writing for Ace Publications, Pablo moved to Rudy Ner Siongco's Gold Star Publications where he also wrote several komiks stories and serialized novels in 1962.

It was in 1963 that Gomez decided to put up his own publishing company thus naming it P.S.G. Publishing House. He served the publishing house from 1963 to 1974 from that time, it published United Komiks, Universal Komiks, Kidlat Komiks, Continental Komiks, and Planet Komiks. It was in this publications that the great komiks legends such as Alex N. Niño and Carlo J. Caparas created a name for themselves. Unfortunately, Gomez had to close down his publishing house and sold the rights to his labels to the Affiliated Publications, Inc.

Gomez also worked as a radio announcer on DZRH and DZFM.

== Works on film and television ==
Among the prolific writers in the Philippines, Gomez created more than 1,000 komiks novels and stories. Some 300 of which were given film adaptations by film studios like Sampaguita Pictures, Lea Productions, FPJ Productions, Seiko Films, Viva Films, and Regal Films.

The movies drawn from his many works were Kurdapya (1955), Gilda (1956), Kandilang Bakal (1957), Anino ni Bathala (1958), Tanikalang Apoy (1959), Kaming Makasalanan (1960), Tatlong Magdalena (1960), Octavia (1961), Tulisan (1962), Sabina (1963), Paano Kita Lilimutin? (1965), Miranda: Ang Lagalag na Sirena (1966), Pitong Krus ng Isang Ina (1968), and Petrang Paminta (1969) from 1950s to 1960s.

In the 1970s, 1980s and 1990s, his list of works that became blockbuster movies were Orang (1970), Kampana sa Santa Quiteria (1971), Santo Domingo (1972), Kampanerang Kuba (1973), Kamay na Gumagapang (1974), Alupihang Dagat (1975), Pagbabalik ng Lawin (1975), Andalucia (1976), Ms. Eva Fonda 16 (1976), Little Christmas Tree (1977), Katawang Alabok (1978), Lihim ng Guadalupe (1979), Inday Bote (1985), Magdusa Ka (1986), Kapag Puno Na ang Salop (1987), Pasan Ko ang Daigdig (1987), Rosa Mistica (1988), Petrang Kabayo at ang Pilyang Kuting (1988), Agila ng Maynila (1988), and Hiram Na Mukha (1992) among others.

He has also done teleplays for Panahon, Makulay na Daigdig ni Nora, and Hilda. He even wrote the story and directed films like Mga Kuwentong Ginto ni Pablo Gomez and together with Narda Sanggalang, he wrote the screenplay and even directed the film Agila ng Maynila (1989).

Gomez also rendered his stories to produce top-rating telenovelas, melodramas and fantasy series. The fantaserye Komiks used some of his works for its episodes like Inday Bote (4 February 2006), Machete (18 March 2006), Kamay ni Hilda (25 March 2006), Bunsong Kerubin (6 May 2006), Inday sa Balitaw (13 May 2006), Si Pardina at ang mga Duwende (15 July 2006), and Bahay ng Lagim (12 August 2006). Aside from that, ABS-CBN also televised Gomez's work like Hiram na Mukha (2007) for their show Sineserye Presents.

Gomez and his works also reached the shores of GMA-7 by allowing them to adapt some of his masterpieces like Pasan Ko ang Daigdig (2007) and Magdusa Ka (2008), both of which were under the show, Sine Novela.

== Awards and recognitions ==
Among Gomez's many awards are the Best Heavy Drama Story award from the Citizens' Council for Mass Media Award in 1971. His screenplay for the film Agila ng Maynila was awarded Best Screenplay in the 37th FAMAS in 1988. He was also nominated for best screenplay/story for the following films: Gilda (1956), Water Lily (1958) together with Carlos Gonda and Anino ni Bathala (1958), and most recently in Batas ng Lansangan (2002) with Manny Buising.

It was in the 50th FAMAS Awards in 2001 that he was given the Dr. Jose Perez Memorial Award for Journalism.

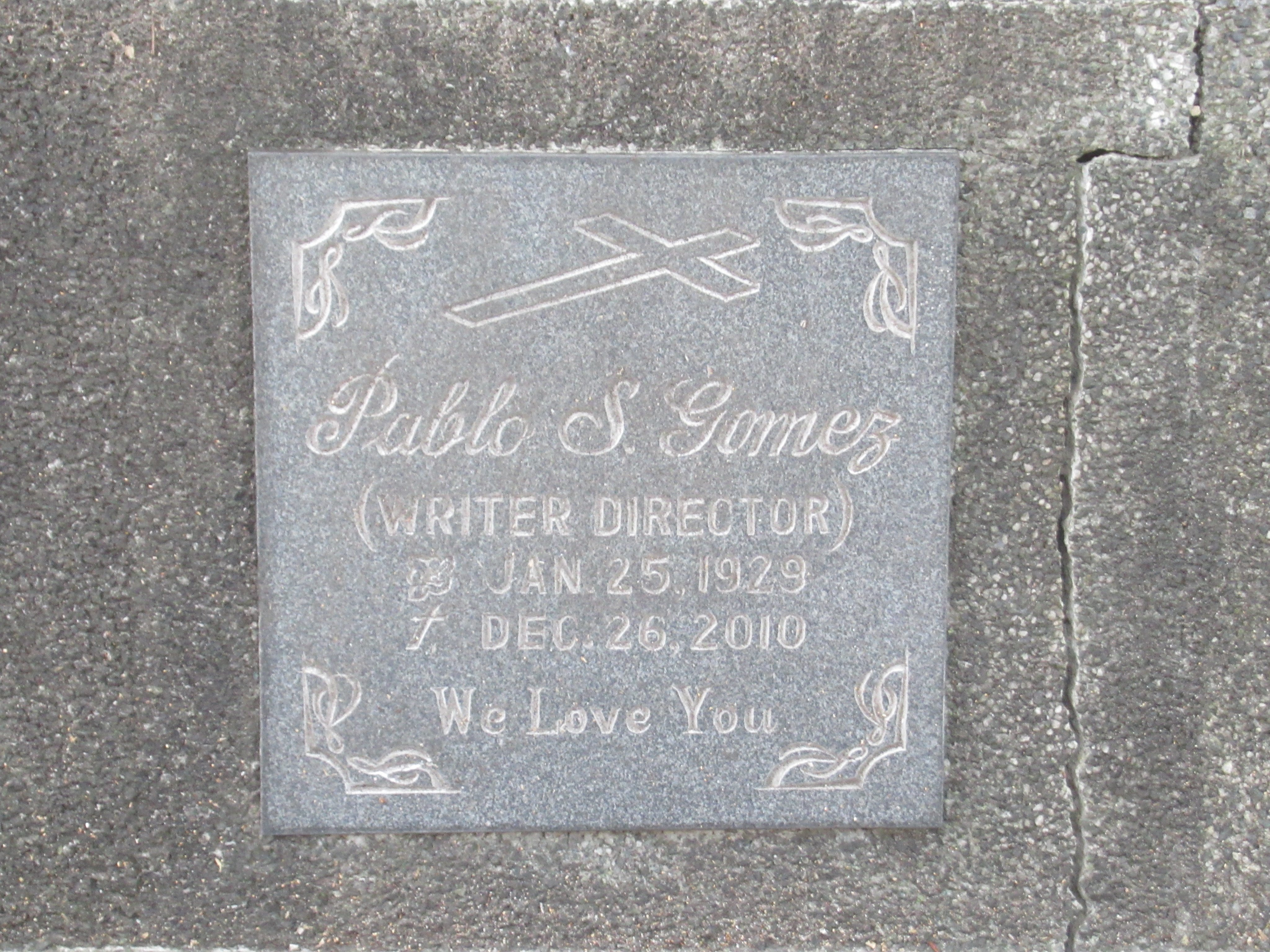
Pablo S. Gomez's grave at La Loma Cemetery.

== Death ==
On December 26, 2010, Gomez died due to cardiac and pulmonary arrest. He was 81 years old.

== Film and television adaptions of his comics ==
- Juanita Banana (television)
- Petrang Kabayo (flims, scriptwriter)
- Machete (television)
- Mutya (television)
- Kampanerang Kuba (television)
- Inday Bote (flims, television)
