= Ian Galliguez =

Filipino actress

- Born: December 11, 1975 (age 50); Philippines
- Occupation: Actress
- Years active: 1993–present
- Agent: ABS-CBN (1993–2014; 2018–present)
- Children: 3

Ian Galliguez (born December 11, 1975) is a Filipino actress known for her comedic role in the television show Labs Ko si Babe. She has appeared on numerous shows on ABS-CBN. Galliguez is of a mixed descent with Spanish, Portuguese, Chinese and Filipino ancestry. She is the mother of one girl and twin boys.

== Background ==
Before acting on television and movies, Galliguez was a Theatre actress and an English teacher. She has a degree in Mass Communications from St. Scholastica's College in Manila.

== Career ==
She was seen on Princess and I, playing Noemi - a Drukpah from the Kingdom of Yang Don.

Galliguez was on Guns and Roses, as Axl, the police 'partner' and best friend of Onat Marasigan, who is played by Ejay Falcon. She was seen on Magkaribal, playing Cora, the market stall owner who was transformed into a runway supermodel. She appearances on primetime TV also include Rosalka, Pangako Sa 'Yo, Detour, Maalaala Mo Kaya and Only You.

On the silver screen, Ian has appeared in a movie with Aga Muhlach and Joyce Jimenez in the comedy Narinig Mo na ba ang Latest?, directed by Joey Reyes. She has also featured on two award-winning independent films - Blood Bank and Paano Ko Sasabihin?.

In 2018, she came back on showbiz and did with Playhouse and Parasite Island as her comeback Kapamilya projects.

== Other works ==
In March 2010, Galliguez started an online travel magazine focused on the local market - DiscoverPH.com. She is now the writer and owner of PinayGadabout.com.

She also contributes to local glossy magazines for travel and lifestyle features. She is also an agent and publicist.

== Filmography ==
=== Movies ===
- Narinig mo na ba ang l8est? (2001) - Noemi (as Ian "Duday" Galliguez)
- Blood Bank (2005 short film) - (as Ian Victor)
- Paano Ko Sasabihin? (2009) - Pixie (as Ian Viktor)
- Bulong (2011) - E.R. Doctor (as Ian "Duday" Galiguez)
- Catch Me... I'm in Love (2011) - Girlie (as Ian Russell Victor)

=== Television ===
- Mara Clara (1993–1997) - Bekya
- Labs Ko si Babe (2000) - Duday
- Tabing Ilog (2000) - Sabrina
- Pangako sa 'Yo (2001) - Chinee
- G-mik (2001) - School Principal
- Pangarap na Bituin (2005) - Manang
- Super Inggo 1.5 Ang Bagong Bangis (2007) - Sheryl
- Only You (2009) - China
- Rosalka (2010) - Juvy
- Magkaribal (2010) - Cora
- Guns N' Roses (2011) - Axl Navarro
- Maalaala Mo Kaya (2012) - Marie (Kalendaryo episode)
- Princess and I (2012) - Noemi
- Be Careful With My Heart (2013) - Applicant
- Hawak Kamay (2014)
- Playhouse (2018) - Mitchie de Vera
- Parasite Island (2019) - Whitney
