= Bernard Palanca =

Filipino actor and host (born 1976)

- Born: Bernard Revilla Palanca Jr. December 3, 1976 (age 49); Pasay, Metro Manila, Philippines
- Other name: BJ
- Occupations: Actor, host, endorser
- Years active: 1996–present
- Spouse: Meryll Soriano (m. 2006; ann. 2015)
- Partner(s): Jerika Ejercito (separated); Tracey Tabora
- Children: 2
- Relatives: Armando Goyena (grandfather); Miko Palanca (brother); Johnny Revilla

Bernard Revilla Palanca Jr. (born December 3, 1976) is a Filipino host, film/television character actor, musician, and product endorser.

== Early life ==
His maternal grandfather José Revilla é Irureta-Goyena, also known as Armando Goyena, was an actor; as was his younger brother, Miko Palanca. He is the son of Bernard Palanca Sr., a race car driver, who died when Bernard Jr. was just a child. On his father's side of the family, he is a grandson of businessman and philanthropist Carlos Palanca Jr. of the family that organizes the Carlos Palanca Memorial Awards for Literature. His mother, Pita Revilla de Hocson (née Revilla vda. de Revilla) came from the Revilla clan of celebrities (not to be confused with the Bautista clan who are more popularly known as Revillas).

Among his aunts are former actress/Camay model/jewelry designer Maritess Revilla de Araneta, Cita Revilla de Yabut, who was also a Camay model, as well as actress and TV host Tina Revilla de Valencia. Bianca Araneta de Elizalde, a model and social entrepreneur and daughter of Marites is his cousin. Another showbiz relation is actor-host-businessman Johnny Revilla, the only brother of Bernard's mother, married to singer Janet Basco.

Palanca is known to be a versatile actor and has worked with all the famous actors and actresses in Philippine cinema. He has Amoy Chinese ancestry from his father's side.

As a television actor, he was also a central supporting role as Anilov Mijares in Kay Tagal Kang Hinintay in 2002–2003 as Johnny Delgado's son.

== Career ==
A member of ABS-CBN's Star Magic stable, Palanca was part of "The Hunks" together with Piolo Pascual, Jericho Rosales, Diether Ocampo, and Carlos Agassi and the defunct band Bizkit Factory that was featured in the movie Kahit Isang Saglit. He is a Star Magic Batch 5 alumni. Palanca also had hosting stint in the Philippine local music television channel Myx on its myx Live! program.

Palanca was also once an endorser for San Miguel Beer Pale Pilsen and currently for Beer na Beer.

=== Network switches ===
Palanca was a member of ABS-CBN Star Magic talents but he did not renew his contract after the expiration. He decided to fuse on GMA Network and became one of the cast of primetime series Gagambino where he worked with Dennis Trillo, Katrina Halili and Ryza Cenon. After Gagambino, Palanca appeared again in the afternoon hit drama series co-starred with Heart Evangelista and JC de Vera in the remake of Ngayon at Kailanman, aired on GMA Network.

Palanca also had a short role on Philippine remake of Rosalinda. He had a guesting role on GMA Network's rival station ABS-CBN via May Bukas Pa for a short stint. He was a regular cast member on GMA's fantasy series called Panday Kids but the management allowed him to have some roles on their rival station ABS-CBN's program Rosalka top-billed by Empress Schuck as well.

He was once part of GMA Network's Philippine remake of Koreanovela Autumn in My Heart - Endless Love and as of 2013, he was back on his home network ABS-CBN. Palanca played Diego Buenavista in the 2015 remake of Pangako Sa 'Yo, a role originally played by Jestoni Alarcon.

In February 2020, he returned to GMA-7 as part of the cultural drama, Legal Wives. He did a 2-episode arc titled Positive as Greg in the GMA drama anthology, Tadhana, during 2019 before playing Gary Salvacion on ABS-CBN's fantasy-sci-fi-horror-drama miniserye, Parasite Island.

== Personal life ==
Palanca has been open about his past drug addiction and admitted he went into rehabilitation during his showbiz hiatus. He was also known for his long-term relationship with actress Rica Peralejo whom he dated from late 2000–2003. He was once married to actress Meryll Soriano, the eldest daughter of host Willie Revillame.

On August 27, 2008, Soriano gave birth to their son, Elijah Pineda (6.5 lbs, 10:01 a.m.) at Makati Medical Center. Her mother, Bec-Bec Soriano, rushed her to hospital, while Palanca and his mother Pita arrived later.

After Palanca and Soriano separated, Palanca dated Jerika Ejercito, daughter of former President and Mayor of Manila Joseph Ejercito Estrada. Jerika gave birth to a baby boy whom they named Isaiah Joseph E. Palanca on May 7, 2014. Palanca and Ejercito are on good terms with Palanca's former wife, Soriano.

Palanca separated from Ejercito in 2016 and is now in a relationship since with Tracey Tabora, a fashion designer and professor, a year later.

Palanca's younger brother and actor Miko died in December 2019 due to an apparent suicide. Three months later, on March 19, 2020, his mother Pita Revilla-Hocson died due to cancer.

== Filmography ==
=== Film ===
Year	Title
1998	Kay Tagal Kang Hinintay
2000	Bukas Na Lang Kita Mamahalin
2000	Azucena: Dog Seller
2000	Kahit Isang Saglit
2000	Bakit Ba Ganyan? (Ewan Ko Nga Ba, Darling)
2001	Sa Huling Paghihintay
2001	Narinig Mo Na Ba Ang L8est?
2001	Pagdating Ng Panahon
2004	All My Life
2006	Sukob
2008	A Very Special Love
2008	Baler
2009	You Changed My Life
2010	Paano Na Kaya
2012	Captive
2013	Four Sisters and a Wedding
2014	Shake, Rattle & Roll XV
2016	How to Be Yours
2018	Sin Island

=== Television ===
Year	Title	Role
1996	Gimik	Scud Torres
1999	Labs Ko Si Babe	Jobert Royales
2001	Sa Dulo ng Walang Hanggan	Alfonso
2002–2003	Kay Tagal Kang Hinintay	Anilov Mijares
2004	Hiram	Alexander
2005	Bora: Sons of the Beach	Lenin
2006	Carlo J. Caparas' Ang Panday	Kamatayan
2007	Rounin	Special Guest
2008	HushHush	Various
2008–2009	Carlo J. Caparas' Gagambino	Dr. Martin
2009	Sine Novela: Ngayon at Kailanman	Raphael "Raf" Mendoza
2009	Rosalinda	Allan
2009	May Bukas Pa	Manny Montalban / Dadskie
2010	Rosalka	Ramon Sta. Maria
2010	Panday Kids	James Villafuerte
2010	Endless Love	Raul
2011	Babaeng Hampaslupa	Young Edward Wong
2013	Huwag Ka Lang Mawawala	Greg
2014	The Legal Wife	Miguel Zapanta
2014	Hawak Kamay	Jacob Caballero
2015	Pangako Sa 'Yo	Anton Diego Buenavista
2016	Bakit Manipis ang Ulap?	Miguel Custodio
2016	My Super D	Pedro
2016	Born For You	Salvador "Buddy" Reyes
2016	Till I Met You	Gino Dee
2017	A Love to Last	Tom Gonzales
2017	The Good Son	Young Don Enrico Gesmundo
2018	FPJ's Ang Probinsyano	Jethro "Jet" Garrido
2019	The General's Daughter	Young Tiago
2019	Sino ang May Sala?: Mea Culpa	Rommel Baniaga
2019	Parasite Island	Gary Salvacion
2021	Legal Wives	Abdul Malik Valeandong
2022	Widows' Web	William Suarez
2022–2023	Unica Hija	Lucas Orosco
2023	Walang Matigas na Pulis sa Matinik na Misis	Balat Trinidad
2023	Can’t Buy Me Love	Ronald Mariano
2023–2024	Lovers & Liars	Martin
2024	Black Rider	Emilio
2024	Lavender Fields	Harry Hidalgo
2024	Shining Inheritance	Rodante dela Costa
2025	Slay	Lenard Zamora
2025–2026	Roja	Dado "Tres" Menor
2026	The Loyalty Game	Antonio "Tonyo" Saguil

=== Drama anthologies / Digital ===
Year	Title	Role
1998	Maalaala Mo Kaya: Bachelor's Pad	
1998	Maalaala Mo Kaya: Munggo	
2003	Maalaala Mo Kaya: Mikropono	
2003	Maalaala Mo Kaya: Dreamhouse	
2003	Maalaala Mo Kaya: Engagement Ring	
2005	Maalaala Mo Kaya: Family Album	
2006	Komiks Presents: Vincent	Vincent
2006	Maalaala Mo Kaya: Punda	
2006	Your Song Presents: I	Main Role
2007	Your Song Presents: May Tama Rin Ako	Main Role
2013	Maalaala Mo Kaya: Sapatos	Spaniard Prisoner
2013	Maalaala Mo Kaya: Diploma	Spaniard Prisoner
2014	Maalaala Mo Kaya: Sanggol	Carlo
2015	Ipaglaban Mo!: Nasaan Ang Konsensya	Melchor
2015	Ipaglaban Mo!: Ganti Ng Sawi	Rey
2016	Ipaglaban Mo!: Pagnanasa	Jojo
2017	Ipaglaban Mo!: Suspetsa	Robert
2019	Maalaala Mo Kaya: Painting	Mark's father
2019	Tadhana: Positive	Greg
2022	Click, Like, Share: Swap	Jon
2023	Magpakailanman: Male Rape Victim	Lando
2025	Magpakailanman: Ang Babaeng Di Na Matuto	Hassim

=== Television shows ===
Year	Title	Role
1995	ASAP	Host / Himself / Guest
2003	Masayang Tanghali Bayan	Host / Himself
2024	Rainbow Rumble	Himself / Contestant
