= Eva Fonda =

Philippine television series

- Title card
- Genre: Romantic drama Thriller
- Created by: ABS-CBN Studios
- Written by: Maribel Ilag; Agnes Gagelonia-Uligan
- Directed by: Jon Red; Frasco Mortiz
- Starring: Cristine Reyes as Eva Fonda
- Theme music composer: Didith Reyes
- Opening theme: "Bakit Ako Mahihiya?" by Jessa Zaragoza
- Composer: Pablo Vergara
- Country of origin: Philippines
- Original languages: Filipino; Japanese
- No. of episodes: 50

Production
- Executive producers: Carlo Katigbak; Cory Vidanes; Laurenti Dyogi; Linggit Tan-Marasigan
- Producers: Jose Antonio Guillermo; Joan Del Rosario-Garcia; Cynthia De Jesus-Jordan
- Production locations: Philippines; Tokyo, Japan
- Running time: 30-45 minutes

Original release
- Network: ABS-CBN
- Release: December 1, 2008 – February 6, 2009

Eva Fonda is a Philippine television drama romance series broadcast on ABS-CBN. The series is based on the 1976 Philippine film of the same title. Directed by Jon Red and Frasco Mortiz, it stars Cristine Reyes. It aired on the network's Primetime Bida line up and worldwide on TFC from December 1, 2008, to February 6, 2009, and was replaced by May Bukas Pa. The series made history in 2009 as it became the first Filipino show to win in Seoul International Drama Awards.

== Premise ==
Eva de Jesus (Cristine Reyes) comes from a poor but a loving family in a small Philippine fishing village. After losing her father at an early age, she and her mother Edeng (Sylvia Sanchez) have been making ends meet on their own. De Jesus wishes to finish school and settle down with her boyfriend Joel Dakila (Jason Abalos). She is perpetually targeted by the town's men because of their perception of her as beautiful and innocent.

When town rich kid Val Mendez (Baron Geisler) returns from Manila, he seeks out and rapes de Jesus; causing her life to circle the drain. Her boyfriend leaves her, and her family is devastated. In her quest to seek justice, she accidentally stabs Mendez's father, Don Ismael (Mark Gil). Whilst imprisoned, her sister dies from a freak accident. De Jesus escapes imprisonment and flees to Manila. Whilst there, she saves beauty agency manager Patricia "Tita Patty" Rosal (BB Gandanghari) from an assailant; grateful, Rosal offers her work as a model.

De Jesus's modelling career rises quickly, and Rosal informs her a Japanese company has hired them. She and de Jesus fly to Japan, where they meet company president Toshiro Fonda (Lito Legaspi). Fonda secretly plans to marry de Jesus; de Jesus accepts and their marriage is solemnised; however, a week after their wedding, Toshiro dies from heart complications.

Eva, now surnamed Fonda, returns to the Philippines, only to be preyed on by Mendez again. Mendez has kidnapped Dakila and another friend, Rosanna "Osang" Paredes (Princess Ryan), and confined them in a dilapidated building.

== Cast and characters ==
=== Main cast ===
- Cristine Reyes as Eva de Jesus / Eva Fonda

=== Supporting cast ===
- Jason Abalos as Joel Dakila
- Baron Geisler as Val Mendez
- Joross Gamboa as Andoy
- Hazel Ann Mendoza as Daldit/Chariz
- Princess Ryan as Rosanna 'Osang' Paredes
- Rustom Padilla as Patricia 'Patty' Rosal
- Al Tantay as Turing Dakila
- Mark Gil as Don Ismael Mendez
- Jean Saburit as Aguida Mendez
- Sylvia Sanchez as Edeng de Jesus
- Dick Israel as Tita Clem
- Lito Legaspi as Toshiro Fonda
- Mika dela Cruz as Elena 'Leleng' de Jesus
- Ya Chang as Kenjie
- Owen Banaag as Popoy Dakila
- Janna Dominguez as Paris
- Alma Moreno as Dara 'Ms. DL/Millet' Lim
- Tetchie Agbayani as Josefina Escop
- Justin De Leon as Efren
- Marissa Sanchez as Cita
- Ronnie Lazaro as Ben
- AJ Dee as Martin
- Kat Alano as Clarice
- Lauren Young as Laura
- Kian Kazemi as Banjo
- RR Enriquez as Virgie
- Tirso Cruz III as Val's friend
- Gian Sotto as Val's friend
- Rez Cortez as Osang's father
- Mike Magat as Badong Cristobal

== Reception ==
=== Television ratings ===
AGB Neilsen Philippines reported that Eva Fonda premiered with 26.8% ratings based on the overnight ratings among Mega Manila households.

== Accolades ==
Accolades received by Eva Fonda
Year	Awards ceremony	Title	Result
2009	Seoul International Drama Awards	Special Prize	Won
2009	Seoul International Drama Awards	Best Drama Series (shared with the cast)	Nominated
2009	Seoul International Drama Awards	Best Actress Cristine Reyes	Nominated
2009	23rd PMPC Star Awards for TV	Best Primetime Drama Series	Nominated

== See also ==
- List of programs broadcast by ABS-CBN
- List of ABS-CBN Studios original drama series
