= Malaya Lewandowski =

Filipino singer and actor

- Born: Malaya Lewandowski (Note: Malaya Lewandowski was born in the United States. Thus, she does not possess her mother's maiden name.); April 13, 1988 (age 38); San Francisco, California, US
- Occupations: Singer, actress, VJ
- Years active: 2007–2009

Malaya Lewandowski (born April 13, 1988) is a singer, actress, Video Jockey, and former beauty queen who has dual American and Filipina citizenship. Lewandowski was a member of the Philippine talent agency Star Magic's girl group named Koolchx. Previously, she has hosted OMG and Music Bang on MYX North America.

== Biography ==
Early life

Lewandowski was born on April 13, 1988 in San Francisco, California, to a Filipina mother and an American father of German and Polish descent. Her first name translates to "free" in Tagalog. Lewandowski grew up in Fairfield, California.

In the United States, Lewandowski won several beauty contests, including Miss California Teen USA, Miss Teen Filipina, and Miss Fiesta Filipina. She was discovered when she won the Miss Teen Filipina competition. As a singer, she spent time in Manila, exploring her way the Philippine entertainment industry.

Career

Lewandowski is currently under contract with ABS-CBN's Star Magic, a Philippine talent agency. She was a regular guest star on the All-Star Sunday Afternoon Party (ASAP), a Philippine television musical variety show produced by ABS-CBN Studios, becoming a part of various TV specials with ABS-CBN. Lewandowski also appeared in Wowowee and Let's Go. Her first regular stint was in Bora: Sons of the Beach.

As part of Star Magic's girl-group Koolchx, Lewandowski appeared on the cover of Maxim Philippines March 2008 issue. She later hosted two segments of Myx North America as a VJ, namely OMG, and Music Bang.

Denial of being Gabby Concepcion's Daughter

Between April and May 2008, Buzz station ran a segment about the love child of matinée idol Gabby Concepcion. According to the clues provided, the child was of Filipina-Polish descent, had a half-sister who had just joined showbiz, and was a member of the Koolchx.

All clues given by Buzz station seemed to point to Lewandowski. However, she denied the reports, saying that she knew the actor as Gabby Concepcion was a family friend. She refused to lend credence to the controversies to separate her career and fame from Concepcion.

Split with Rafael Rosell

In 2009, news came out that Lewandowski and Rafael Rosell, whom she dated for three years, had split, which Rosell later confirmed. In an April 2009 episode of The Buzz, Rosell gave details on the split in an interview with Kris Aquino.

== Filmography ==
Television
Year	Title	Role	Notes
2006	Bora: Sons of the Beach		
2006	Let's Go		
2007–2009	Music Bang	Herself	Host
2007–2009	OMG	Herself	Host

Film
Year	Title	Role	Notes
2007	One More Chance	Beng	
