= Natutulog Ba ang Diyos? =

2007 Philippine television drama series

- Genre: Soap opera
- Created by: ABS-CBN Studios
- Based on: Natutulog Pa ang Diyos by Ruben R. Marcelino; Natutulog Pa Ang Diyos by Lino Brocka
- Written by: Joel Mercado; Arlene Tamayo
- Directed by: Jerry Lopez Sineneng; Rechie del Carmen
- Starring: Roxanne Guinoo; Jake Cuenca; Joross Gamboa
- Theme music composer: Nonong Buencamino; Jose Bartolome
- Ending theme: "Natutulog Ba ang Diyos?" by Lani Misalucha
- Country of origin: Philippines
- Original language: Filipino
- No. of episodes: 65

Production
- Executive producer: Ma. Cristina N. Santos
- Running time: 20-25 minutes
- Production company: Dreamscape Entertainment Television

Original release
- Network: ABS-CBN
- Release: July 16 – October 12, 2007

Related
- May Minamahal

Natutulog Ba ang Diyos? (transl. Is God Asleep?) is a 2007 Philippine television drama series broadcast by ABS-CBN. Based on the 1988 Philippine film Natutulog Pa ang Diyos, the series is the fourth and final instalment of Sineserye Presents. Directed by Jerry Lopez Sinenang and Rechie del Carmen, it stars Roxanne Guinoo, Jake Cuenca and Joross Gamboa. It aired on the network's Primetime Bida line up and worldwide on TFC from July 16 to October 12, 2007, replacing May Minamahal and was replaced by Pinoy Big Brother: Celebrity Edition 2.

The story revolves around a young woman who was switched at birth. As a result, what could have been a life of prosperity became a life of poverty. Meanwhile, the baby boy who was put in her rightful place has grown up to be spoiled and irresponsible, but is secretly caught up in his feelings for her.

== Original film plot ==
Everyone notices how different Andrew (Ricky Davao) and Gillian (Lorna Tolentino) look from their respective sets of parents but no one really makes a fuss about it. What is even more surprising is that the two have never felt close with the families they grew up with. Instead, Gillian becomes more closely attached to Andrew's parents (Ricky Belmonte and Marita Zobel) and Andrew feels drawn to Gillian's parents, Bernardo (Dante Rivero) and Patria (Gina Pareño). Little do they suspect that this is because Andrew and Gillian had been switched at birth. Andrew's real father, Bernardo, a poor private driver, decides that Andrew will have a better life growing up with his rich bosses. So he makes sure that only he and his wife Patria know that he has switched the two babies when the mothers both gave birth at a provincial hospital. No amount of pleading from Patria can make him change his mind. Out of frustration, Patria resorts to maltreating Gillian. The latter finds comfort with Andrew's mother, Rose (Marita Zobel), and later with Mark (Gary Valenciano), a rich suitor. Jealous of Gillian's newfound attention, Andrew decides to force himself on Gillian, an act which leads to the revelation of the secret of their parentage.

== Plot ==
Roxanne plays Gillian, the rightful heiress of a wealthy couple, but was switched with Andrew (Jake Cuenca), the son of a driver. Andrew, who grows up to be irresponsible, is secretly in love with Gillian. On the other hand, Joross Gamboa is Mark, who adds to the confusion, as he is Andrew's best friend, who also has feelings for Gillian.

== Cast and characters ==
=== Main cast ===
- Roxanne Guinoo as Gillian Ramirez/Angeles - Bernardo and Patria's supposed eldest daughter. She grew up in poverty, but although she yearns for a better life, she wants to bring it about herself, not by relying on other people. Disciplined and responsible, she is liked by Mike and Rose, her parents employers. Unfortunately, her own parents don't think too highly of her, and treat her badly.
- Jake Cuenca as Andrew Angeles/Ramirez - the only supposed child of Mike and Rose. This spoiled brat always wants to be the center of attention, and will never hesitate to get back at those who stand in his way. The only person he turns to for advice is his best friend, Mark. He tries to prove himself to his parents, but he always end up being compared unfavorably to Gillian. As such, he tries to get back at her every time. However, despite that, he really is in love with Gillian. Later in the story, Andrew and Gillian become lovers but it just doesn't work out for the two since their parents separate them apart.
- Joross Gamboa as Mark Vilchez - a rich 19-year-old who eventually falls for Gillian. This achiever is pressured to always take the number one spot, because of his parents. He is Andrew's best friend, who never fails to check Andrew when he's being too arrogant. He loves Gillian so much that he even stands up to her against Andrew, although he can't do the same when he's in front of his parents. A year later, he moves on with Trish, though he can't get Gillian of his head.
- Dina Bonnevie as Rose Angeles - Andrew's mother. She's a supportive wife, yet she tries to keep her husband in check whenever he's mad at their son Andrew. She loves Andrew so much, that she always gives him another chance to change, but she can't explain why she has a certain fondness for Gillian.
- Rosanna Roces as Patria Ocampo-Ramirez - Bernardo's wife. She never hesitates to raise her hand against Gillian, as she projects her anger and regret onto her daughter. She's not satisfied with her life, so she engages in various sidelines. Like her husband, her weakness is Andrew, as she'll do everything for her eldest son.
- Mat Ranillo III as Mike Angeles - Andrew's father. Mike grew up in a rich family, but he was able to expand the family business through his own hard work. He treats his wife, Rose, as an equal, but as a father to Andrew, he's rather strict, as he thinks his son is just wasting his life away. He favors Gillian more, although he can't really pinpoint why.
- Ronnie Lazaro as Bernardo Ramirez - Mike and Rose's driver. He doesn't want to live in poverty, yet he doesn't do anything to prevent it. All his life, he wished to be like his childhood friend Mike, who's living a good life. Although he already has three children, Gillian, Tina and Boy, he'll always have a soft spot for Andrew, who's actually his real son.

=== Supporting cast ===
- Bing Pimentel as Emma Vilchez - Mark's mother, who falls for Mike. She always pressures her son to do what she wants, and desperately wants to maintain their social status no matter what.
- Denise Laurel as Trish Crisostomo - a prim and proper girl from the upper class. She grew up with Mark, and eventually fell in love with him, as she realized that he's the man of her dreams.
- Martin del Rosario as Boy Ramirez - loving brother to Gillian.
- Mara Lopez as Tina Ramirez - bad, selfish sister to Gillian. She runs away from home and then comes back.
- Paw Diaz as Karla - friend of Gillian whom she met when working in the club. They meet each other again after running away from their homes.
- Minnie Aguilar as Minerva - rich mother of Karla. She dreams of becoming a millionaire. She goes to jail after almost shooting Rose at gunpoint.
- Mark Dionisio as Raul - Bernardo's accomplice.
- Sheena Elena Robiso as Leslie- the youngest sister of Patria.
- Jessy Mendiola as Michelle

=== Guest cast ===
- Basty Alcances as Young Boy
- Cheska Billiones as Young Tina
- Julio Pisk as Young Andrew
- Nash Aguas as Young Mark
- Khaycee Aboloc as Young Gillian
- Gail Lardizabal as Moira Crisostomo - the youngest sister of Trish.

== Theme song ==
- The theme song, "Natutulog Ba Ang Diyos" performed by Lani Misalucha, is a cover of the Gary Valenciano's song. It was released by Universal Records on the compilation "Palabas".
- Natutulog Ba Ang Diyos' original name was Natutulog Pa Ang Diyos in the film.

== See also ==
- List of programs broadcast by ABS-CBN
- Sineserye Presents
- Natutulog ba Ang Diyos? Unofficial Episode Guide at Pinoy TV Junkie
