= The Haunted (Philippine TV series) =

2019–20 Philippine television drama series

- Title card
- Genre: Horror
- Created by: Nathan Arciaga
- Written by: Marc Ferdinand Castaneda; Allan Cuadra; Maria Abegail Parayno; Mariami Tanangco-Domingo
- Directed by: Manny Palo; Benedict Mique
- Creative director: Rondel P. Lindayag
- Starring: Jake Cuenca; Shaina Magdayao; Denise Laurel; Queenzy Calma
- Country of origin: Philippines
- Original language: Filipino
- No. of seasons: 1
- No. of episodes: 10 (list of episodes)

Production
- Executive producers: Roldeo T. Endrinal; Julie Anne R. Benitez; Brenda Lee E. Estocapio
- Editor: Mark Segubience
- Running time: 30-45 minutes
- Production company: Dreamscape Entertainment

Original release
- Network: ABS-CBN
- Release: December 8, 2019 – February 9, 2020

The Haunted is a Philippine television drama horror series broadcast by ABS-CBN. Directed by Manny Palo and Benedict Mique, it stars Jake Cuenca, Shaina Magdayao, Denise Laurel, and Queenzy Calma. It aired on the network's Yes Weekend line up and worldwide on TFC from December 8, 2019 to February 9, 2020, replacing Parasite Island and was replaced by 24/7.

== Synopsis ==
Jordan and Aileen bought a house and have a happy family. But unknown to them, Jordan's past haunt them, literally.

== Plot ==
Jordan and Aileen moved to a very old house. Unknown by Aileen, Jordan cheated with Monica but Jordan doesn't love her. One night, while Monica tries to kiss Jordan, Jordan accidentally kills Monica and buries her in a house where they just moved in. Now, Monica is trying to get justice to her unlawful homicide incident. While trying to do this, Monica tries to get revenge by haunting the whole family. Their daughter, Angel, is being haunted by Monica whilst having a disease and when Jordan and Aileen saw it, they immediately rushed her to the hospital. While Angel is healing, Monica came back to see her and took her. While Monica is still trying to haunt the family, she took care of Angel and a few years passed by when Jordan and Aileen found her again. Angel doesn't remember her real mother and father so she writes bad things about them. After Angel saw the truth, Monica became very angry and tries to capture her. Meanwhile, Aileen and the police are trying to investigate about Monica. When they found out that Jordan was the killer, they immediately tried to arrest Jordan but Jordan fights back and gets shot. Meanwhile, Monica successfully captures Angel and Jordan also didn't notice very soon that he is already dead after he got shot. Angel falls to the ground but is saved by her dead grandma. Monica also got justice and is now in peace. After another incident, Angel celebrates her birthday. While her birthday is going, Jordan's ghost is just behind there, crying, also celebrating her birthday.

== Cast and characters ==
Main cast

- Jake Cuenca as Jordan Sebastian
- Shaina Magdayao as Aileen Robles-Sebastian
- Denise Laurel as Monica Mendez
- Althea Ruedas as older Angel Robles-Sebastian
  - Queenzy Calma as young Angel Robles-Sebastian

Supporting cast

- Simon Ibarra as Caloy Delgado
- Ruby Ruiz as Jonalyn
- Alex Castro as PO1 Bernard Robles Jr.
- Victor Silayan as Rommel Mendez
- Ingrid dela Paz as Lorraine
- Sheenly Gener as Nikki
- Eian Rances as Kiel Valenzuela
- Erlinda Villalobos as Bening

Special Participation

- Rita Avila as Anita
- Ana Abad Santos as Salve
- Krystal Mejes as young Aileen
- Onyok Pineda as Enchong
- Josh De Guzman as Ren-ren
- Nhikzy Calma as Miyong

== Ratings ==
Kantar Media National TV Ratings (8:00PM PST)
Pilot Episode	Finale Episode	Peak	Average
14.9% December 8, 2019	24.0% February 9, 2020	24.0% February 9, 2020	15.8%

== See also ==
- List of programs broadcast by ABS-CBN
- List of ABS-CBN Studios original drama series
