= May Minamahal (TV series) =

2007 Philippine television drama series

- Also known as: Loving Someone
- Genre: Soap opera
- Created by: ABS-CBN Studios
- Based on: May Minamahal by Jose Javier Reyes
- Directed by: Gilbert G. Perez; Nuel Naval
- Starring: Anne Curtis; Oyo Boy Sotto
- Theme music composer: Willy Cruz
- Ending theme: "May Minamahal" by Erik Santos
- Country of origin: Philippines
- Original language: Filipino
- No. of episodes: 30

Production
- Running time: 30 minutes
- Production company: Star Creatives

Original release
- Network: ABS-CBN
- Release: June 4 – July 13, 2007

Related
- Hiram na Mukha; Natutulog Ba ang Diyos?

May Minamahal (International title: Loving Someone) is a 2007 Philippine television drama series broadcast by ABS-CBN. Based on a 1993 Philippine film of the same title, the series is the third instalment of Sineserye Presents. Directed by Gilbert G. Perez and Nuel Naval, it stars Anne Curtis and Oyo Boy Sotto. It aired on the network's Primetime Bida line up and worldwide on TFC from June 4 to July 13, 2007, replacing Hiram na Mukha and was replaced by Natutulog Ba ang Diyos?.

== Original film plot ==
Only son, Carlitos, suddenly finds himself the man of an all-female household when his father dies of a heart attack. He falls in love with an offbeat girl and is forced to make a choice between following his heart or risk losing the love of the family which has nurtured him all his life.

== Plot ==
Monica grew up in a male-dominated household. Her witty and free-spirited attitude caught the attention of Carlitos. He, on the other hand, lives in a female dominated household, where everyone depends on him. They start to get to know each other more everyday, hang out together and share each other's feelings. And as they draw closer to each other, they start to fall in love. Little did they know that their family ties will be the factor that will make or break their budding relationship.

== Cast and characters ==
=== Main characters ===
- Anne Curtis as Monica Fernandez-Tagle - a strong and independent woman who wouldn't back out at any challenge. She grew up without a mom, but is smothered by love by her brothers Bombit and Jun, as well as her dad, Cenon.
- Oyo Boy Sotto as Carlitos Tagle - the only son of Ronald and Becky Tagle, and a mama's boy. Responsible, he tries to go out of his way to please everyone, and he is rather close to his sisters, Trina and Pinky. He often clashes with his younger sister Mandy, as they have different opinions on everything.

=== Supporting characters ===
Carlitos' family

- Dimples Romana as Trina Tagle – Carlitos' older sister, who's at constant odds with their mother Becky. She's a single mother of one and a flight attendant for domestic flights in an airline.
- Cherie Gil as Becky Tagle – A socialite, she grew up with a silver spoon in her mouth, and is very much dependent on her husband for finances. She's close to her daughter Mandy, as they have the same personality and tastes; while she's rather distant from her eldest daughter Trina, as she's close to her dad.
- Michelle Madrigal as Mandy Tagle – Carlitos' liberated sister. A wild college girl, she's quite eccentric when it comes to clothes. She always get into arguments with Carlitos, and is only afraid of their father.
- Angellie Urquico as Pinky Tagle – Carlitos' youngest sister whom he never fails to dote upon. She's also close to their father, but only listens to her Kuya Carlitos.

Monica's family

- Baron Geisler as Bombit Fernandez – Monica's strict kuya. Overprotective, he's skilled in sports, and knows a thing or two in martial arts. He is Carlitos' brother from another mother.
- Al Tantay as Cenon Fernandez – Monica, Bombit and Jun's dad, Darlyn's older brother. A loving father, he tries to fill in the role of his deceased wife. As such, his sons and daughter treat him like a close friend, although they're afraid of him when he gets mad.
- Jaclyn Jose as Darlyn Fernandez – Monica's aunt, and Cenon's younger sister. A responsible sister, she tries to extend her help whenever she can, and is dedicated to her family. She fell in love with Ronald Tagle, Carlitos' father, and proceeded to become his mistress because she loves him. She used to bring viands to Ronald's office, until the two finally met and fell in love.
- Marvin Raymundo as Jun Fernandez – one of Monica's brothers, like Bombit, he protects her sister and participates in physical sports and defense.

Other characters

- John Arcilla as Ronald Tagle
- Krissy Nunez as Yvette Tagle
- Gail Lardizabal as Kristine Fernandez

== See also ==
- List of programs broadcast by ABS-CBN
- Sineserye Presents
- May Minamahal (film)
