= Parasite Island =

2019 Philippine television drama series

- Title card
- Genre: Drama; Fantasy; Horror
- Created by: PJ Endrinal
- Written by: Mari Lamasan; Clarissa Estuar-Navarro; Mariami Tanangco-Domingo; Raymond Diamzon
- Directed by: Avel E. Sunpongco; Richard I. Arellano
- Creative director: Rondel P. Lindayag
- Starring: Rafael Rosell; Bernard Palanca; Michael Flores; Bianca Manalo; Ria Atayde; Desiree del Valle
- Country of origin: Philippines
- Original language: Filipino
- No. of episodes: 13 (list of episodes)

Production
- Executive producers: Roldeo T. Endrinal; Julie Anne R. Benitez; Brenda Lee E. Estocapio
- Editor: Mark Segubience
- Running time: 30 minutes
- Production companies: Dreamscape Entertainment; Cinemedia

Original release
- Network: ABS-CBN
- Release: September 8 – December 1, 2019

Parasite Island is a 2019 Philippine television drama fantasy series broadcast by ABS-CBN. Directed by Avel E. Sunpongco and Richard I. Arellano, starring Rafael Rosell, Bernard Palanca, Michael Flores, Bianca Manalo, Ria Atayde and Desiree del Valle. It aired on the network's Yes Weekend! line up and worldwide on TFC from September 8 to December 1, 2019, replacing Hiwaga ng Kambat and was replaced by The Haunted.

== Synopsis ==
In a remote island village off the coast of mainland Luzon, a legend about mysterious, invasive and parasitic leeches that turn people into zombie-like state intertwines the stories of its past victim, the village man, and the current one, the family of a young father on the edge of falling apart due to a festering infighting.

== Cast and characters ==
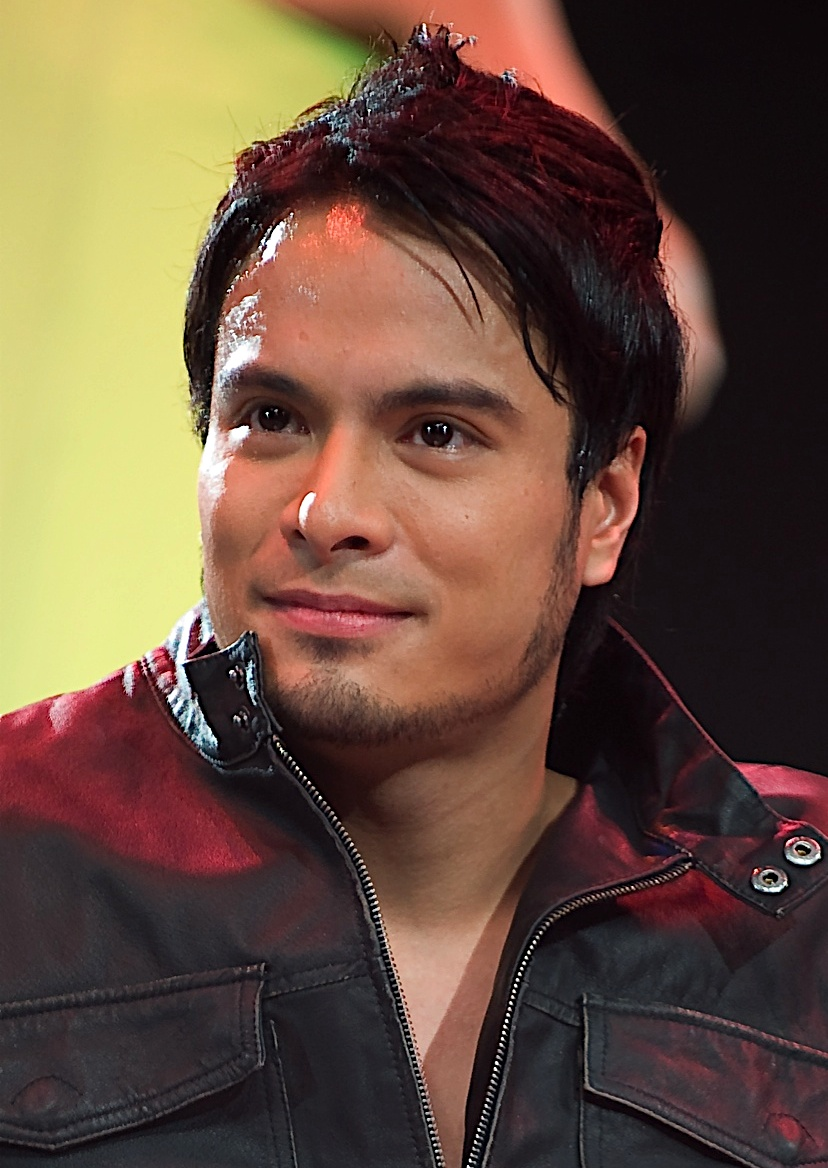
Rafael Rosell portrays Jessie Salvacion.

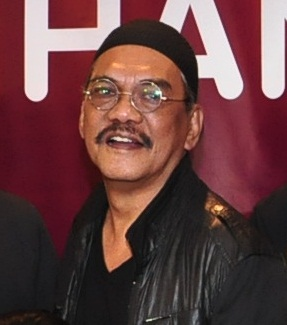
Lou Veloso portrays Andong.

Main cast

- Rafael Rosell as Jessie Salvacion
- Bernard Palanca as Gary Salvacion
- Michael Flores as Warren Salvacion
- Bianca Manalo as Melba Dimaano
- Ria Atayde as Janelle Salvacion
- Desiree del Valle as Queenie Salvacion

Supporting cast

- Liza Lorena as Daria Angeles-Salvacion
- Charlie Dizon as Princess Leanna Aurora Brittany Salvacion
- Kaori Oinuma as Malia "Lia" Dimaano
- Althea A. Cuestas as Sunshine Salvacion
- Paulo Angeles as Miguel "Miggy" Salvacion
- Fino Herrera as TJ Castro
- Ian Galliguez as Whitney Gallardo
- Zeppi Borromeo as Christopher "Otap" Cruz
- Kenken Nuyad as Crispin Sejera
- Lou Veloso as Andong Sejera

Special Participation

- Cheska Iñigo as young Daria
- Zyren Dela Cruz as young Jessie
- Noel Comia Jr. as young Gary
- Uno Madrid as young Warren
- Junyka Santarin as young Melba
- Alvin Fortuna as Tony Marasigan
- Heidi Arima as Rhoda Marasigan
- Art Acuña as Miguel Salvacion
- Niña Dolino as Stephanie Marasigan

== Ratings ==
Kantar Media National TV Ratings (7:00PM PST)
Pilot Episode	Finale Episode	Peak	Average
30.0% September 8, 2019	27.0% December 1, 2019	31.6% September 29, 2019	28.7%

== Rerun ==
The show re-aired on Kapamilya Channel from May 8 to July 31, 2021, replacing Kadenang Ginto: The Golden Comeback and was replaced by the reruns of Hiwaga ng Kambat.

== See also ==
- List of programs broadcast by ABS-CBN
- List of ABS-CBN Studios original drama series
