= Palimos ng Pag-ibig (TV series) =

2007 Philippine television drama series

- Also known as: Begging for Love
- Genre: Soap opera; Drama; Romance
- Created by: ABS-CBN Studios
- Based on: Palimos ng Pag-ibig (1986) by Eddie Garcia
- Directed by: Wenn V. Deramas; Andoy Ranay
- Starring: Kristine Hermosa; Diether Ocampo; Rica Peralejo
- Theme music composer: George Canseco
- Ending theme: "Hiram" by Zsa Zsa Padilla
- Country of origin: Philippines
- Original language: Filipino
- No. of episodes: 33

Production
- Running time: 30 minutes

Original release
- Network: ABS-CBN
- Release: March 5 – April 20, 2007

Related
- Hiram na Mukha

Palimos ng Pag-ibig (International title: Begging for Love) is a 2007 Philippine television drama series broadcast by ABS-CBN. Based on a 1986 Philippine film of the same title, the series is the first instalment of Sineserye Presents. Directed by Wenn Deramas and Andoy Ranay, it stars Kristine Hermosa, Diether Ocampo and Rica Peralejo. It aired on the network's Primetime Bida line up and worldwide on TFC from March 5 to April 20, 2007, and was replaced by Hiram na Mukha.

== Origin ==
=== Comics ===
Palimos ng Pag-ibig was first serialized in Komiks before it was translated to the big screen. It was created and written by Nerissa Cabral.

=== 1986 film ===
The comic was adapted into a film in 1986 under Viva Films. It starred Vilma Santos as Fina, Dina Bonnevie as Ditas and Edu Manzano as Rodel.

== Plot ==
Ditas (Kristine Hermosa) is a surrogate mother who is struggling financially. She makes a living by selling her babies to the highest bidder, a lucrative job that is problem-free until a well-to-do couple approaches her one day.

The couple, Rodel (Diether Ocampo) and Fina (Rica Peralejo), are young, attractive, and rich. Both Rodel and Fina are eager to start a family; however, Fina has a medical condition that prevents her from bearing children. When they hear rumors about a certain surrogate mother who happens to be Ditas, the couple sees an opportunity to finally fill the void in their lives.

Problems arise when Rodel perceives qualities in Ditas that he deems his wife is lacking. Soon the casual business deal becomes entangled and a more intimate relationship develops between Rodel and Ditas. Now Fina must do everything to make the family whole again even if that means having to beg Rodel for his once undivided love and affection.

== Cast and characters ==
ScreenCaps from a Promotional Teaser

=== Main cast ===
- Rica Peralejo as Fina Alcaraz - a successful OBGYN, who ironically helps other women conceive, yet is unable to do it for herself. Various medical complications prohibit her from having a baby, crushing her dreams of having her own kids. A loving wife to her husband, Rodel, she wishes nothing for him but his happiness.
- Kristine Hermosa as Ditas - born to a destitute family, she turns to the business of "baby-making" in order to build a more promising future for herself.
- Diether Ocampo as Rodel Alcaraz - Fina's loyal husband. Albeit a shrewd businessman, Rodel puts his family first and wishes for nothing else but to have a family of his own. But when a medical condition makes Fina barren, Rodel takes the initiative to contract a baby-maker to carry the child his wife cannot.

=== Supporting cast ===
- Carlos Agassi as Dick - Rodel's business partner and best friend. He is happy-go-lucky and strives to live a carefree bachelor's life even though he has a family already.
- Enchong Dee as Job - Fina's younger brother, a one-woman-man who idolizes his sister's husband very much.
- Desiree del Valle as Verna - Ditas' friend. Content with being somebody else's mistress, she paves the way for Ditas and Rodel to meet.
- Eugene Domingo as Mitos - Fina's friend whom she envies for having the "perfect" family. Bubbly and cheerful, she serves as the series' comic relief.
- DJ Durano as Paolo - the wayward man who gets Ditas pregnant and eventually forces her to sell their baby.
- Susan Africa as Tesang - Ditas' mother.
- Helga Krapf as Marichu - Ditas' sister, who incidentally is also Job's girlfriend.
- Yuuya Kadooka as Reggie Alcaraz - Ditas and Rodel's son.

== See also ==
- List of ABS-CBN Studios original drama series
- List of programs broadcast by ABS-CBN
- Sineserye Presents
