= Kampanerang Kuba =

2005 Philippine television drama series

- Title card
- Genre: Musical; Fantasy; Drama
- Based on: Kampanerang Kuba (Komiks) by Pablo S. Gomez; Kampanerang Kuba (1973) by Nilo Saez
- Written by: Keiko Aquino
- Directed by: Wenn V. Deramas; Andoy Ranay
- Starring: Anne Curtis; Christian Bautista; Luis Manzano; Patrick Garcia
- Opening theme: "Sabihin Mo Sa Akin" by Sheryn Regis
- Ending theme: "Sabihin Mo Sa Akin" by Sheryn Regis (1st ending song); "The Memory Will Remain" by Michelle Ayalde (2nd and ending song)
- Composer: Vincent de Jesus
- Country of origin: Philippines
- Original language: Tagalog
- No. of episodes: 140

Production
- Executive producers: Carlo Katigbak; Cory Vidanes; Laurenti Dyogi; Ginny Monteagudo-Ocampo
- Producers: Mio Siojo; Narciso Gulmatico, Jr. Malou N. Santos
- Production locations: Silang, Cavite; Nagcarlan, Laguna
- Running time: 45 minutes
- Production company: Star Creatives

Original release
- Network: ABS-CBN
- Release: June 6 – December 16, 2005

Kampanerang Kuba (International title: Enchanting Fatima / transl. hunchbacked female bell-ringer) is a 2005 Philippine television drama series broadcast by ABS-CBN. Directed by Wenn V. Deramas and Andoy Ranay, it stars Anne Curtis in the title role, Christian Bautista, Luis Manzano, and Patrick Garcia, along with Jean Garcia, Eula Valdez, Jodi Sta. Maria, Desiree del Valle, Cherry Pie Picache, Jaime Fabregas, Eugene Domingo, Malou de Guzman, Meryll Soriano, Yul Servo, Mark Bautista, and Jomari Yllana in their supporting roles. The series is based on Pablo S. Gomez fictional character of the same name and a loose adaptation of the 1973 Philippine film of the same title. It aired on the network's Primetime Bida line up and worldwide on TFC from June 6 to December 16, 2005.

The series is currently available online on ABS-CBN Entertainment and Jeepney TV Youtube Channel.

== Story ==
=== Background ===
Lucia and Lourdes Saavedra are half-sisters. Lucia has fallen in love with Antonio (a poor man of whom her father disapproves), while Lourdes falls in love with Martin. She is unaware that he is Prinsipe Abuk, who has betrayed his people to be human instead of a kuba and who has fallen for Lucia. Lucia marries Antonio; she later believes he was killed from a beating her father engineered. Her maid (and friend) Jacinta told her he was dead to one day win his love. Lucia was also told that her baby daughter was stillborn (although she is sure she heard her cry before she lost consciousness). Lourdes gives birth the same night, delivering a baby girl whom she saw was a kuba before she passed out. Martin switches his baby with Lucia's, leaving his own baby at a church.

=== The kampanera ===
The young kuba is named Imang, and grows up to be the kampanera (the person who rings the church bell). She later becomes the nursemaid of Lourdes, and bonds with her immediately. Lourdes' "daughter" Veronica is jealous and finds comfort with her Aunt Lucia, who has returned home after beginning a new life with her American husband and stepson Luke. Lucia doubts Veronica is her daughter since she has never felt a motherly bond with her. Lourdes is jealous of Lucia's closeness to Martin.

The nuns try to help Imang, and bring her back to life after Martin wrongly convinced people she was evil and deserved to be stoned for stealing a sacred crown from the church, with the help of Veronica (who wanted to be with Luke due to her jealously of Imang with him). They later found a candle that, when lit, would make her human. She used this to pretend to be Lucia's long-lost daughter Bernadette to remain close to her mother Lourdes (who, after Imang's "death", was finally told by the nuns that Imang was her daughter).

Meanwhile, Veronica is angry that Luke has not returned her love and loves Bernadette instead. She uses magic to change her appearance, and adopts the name Agatha to gain her family's trust and avenge Bernadette. Pablo has fallen for Bernadette (although he would always make fun of her as Imang), and the truth about his parentage is raised. Lorenzo loved Imang when she was a kuba. After Lucia's husband Clark dies, she discovers that Antonio did not die; he has lost the use of his legs and believes she betrayed him (when, instead, her father was to blame). She and Antonio discover that Veronica is actually their daughter.

=== Conclusion ===
In the end, everybody finds out whose daughter belongs to whom. Bernadette/Imang does not need the candle to remain human. Veronica is turned into a tree for her many misdeeds, and her parents rekindle their marriage while they care for her. Martin is a kuba, and Lourdes still loves him now that he is good. Luke sacrificed his life for Imang/Bernadette; Bernadette chooses to be with Pablo, while Lorenzo finds another who looks like her.

== Pre-production ==
It was first rumored that Claudine Barretto then Jodi Sta. Maria will get the title role for "Fatima", often referred to as "Imang", but ABS-CBN picked Anne Curtis instead, shortly after she transferred from GMA Network. On the other hand, Jodi got the role of Veronica. This was a reunion between Eula Valdez and Jean Garcia after their successful show Pangako Sa 'Yo, which ran from 2000 up to 2002, when they played rivals Amor and Claudia. In Kuba they played as sisters. Ten years later, Eula Valdez, Jean Garcia and Jomari Yllana reunited together in The Half Sisters aired on GMA Network. Jodi left the role, due to pregnancy and was replaced by Desiree del Valle. This is Patrick Garcia's last show, before moving to GMA Network. Like Eula and Jean, this was also the reunion of Jodi and Patrick after the success of Pangako Sa 'Yo, Tabing Ilog and Darating ang Umaga.

The series also marked the acting debuts of Luis Manzano and Christian Bautista.

Pablo S. Gomez wrote the script for the series, who also works in another soap opera – Mga Anghel na Walang Langit.

== Cast and characters ==
=== Main cast ===
- Anne Curtis as Fatima "Imang" de Vera-Bartolome/ Prinsesa Abuk/ Bernadette de Vera, derived from Our Lady of Fátima and St. Bernadette.
- Patrick Garcia as Luke Tennyson, derived from St. Luke.
- Luis Manzano as Pablo Bartolome, derived from St. Paul.
- Christian Bautista as Lorenzo, derived from St. Lorenzo Ruiz.
- Eula Valdez as Lourdes Saavedra-de Vera, derived from Our Lady of Lourdes.
- Jean Garcia as Lucia Saavedra-Tennyson, derived from Lucia dos Santos, who experienced an apparition of the Virgin Mary.
- Jomari Yllana as Martin de Vera/Prinsepe Abuk, derived from Saint Martin of Tours.
- Jodi Sta. Maria / Desiree del Valle as Veronica Saavedra/ Agatha, derived from Saint Veronica and Saint Agatha of Sicily.
- Mark Bautista as Repusakach (super chaka)

=== Supporting cast ===
- Edgar Mortiz as Agaton
- Cherry Pie Picache as Jacinta
- Eugene Domingo as Sister Clara, derived from St. Clare of Assisi.
- Jaime Fabregas as Francisco Saavedra
- Yul Servo as Antonio Bartolome, derived from St. Anthony the Great.
- Marissa Delgado as Lola Mangkukulam
- Meryll Soriano as Sister Cecilia, derived from St. Cecilia
- Malou de Guzman as Sister Marcelina
- Marco Alcaraz as Gabriel, derived from Archangel Gabriel.
- Matt Hadfield as Clark Tennyson
- Allan Paule as Solomon Durano
- Arlene Muhlach as Teresing Bartolome
- DJ Durano as Angel
- Chokoleit as Otlum
- Jojit Lorenzo as Sikarma
- Frances Makil-Ignacio as Sarah Durano
- Cacai Bautista as Matilda Durano
- Cheena Crab as Magdalena Durano
- Rommel Chika as Maluk

=== Guest cast ===
- Issa Pressman as the young Imang de Vera
- Joshua Cadelina as the young Lorenzo
- Frederick Schnell as the young Luke
- Joy Folloso as the young Veronica
- Isay Alvarez as Ms. Anandalita Ybrahim
- Carlos Morales as Mr. Ybrahim
