= Bora (TV series) =

2005–06 Philippine television sitcom series

- Genre: Sitcom
- Created by: ABS-CBN Studios
- Written by: Jose Javier Reyes; Raymund Barcelon; Joseph Domingo; Mike Valenzuela; Kaloy Alamares
- Directed by: Johnny Manahan
- Starring: Piolo Pascual; Diether Ocampo; Jericho Rosales; Bernard Palanca; Carlos Agassi; Roderick Paulate; Luis Manzano
- Theme music composer: Lito Camo
- Opening theme: "Bora" by Lito Camo
- Country of origin: Philippines
- Original language: Filipino
- No. of episodes: 61

Production
- Executive producer: Phoebe Anievas

Original release
- Network: ABS-CBN
- Release: February 15, 2005 – April 11, 2006

Bora is a Philippine television sitcom series broadcast by ABS-CBN. Directed by Johnny Manahan, it stars Piolo Pascual, Diether Ocampo, Jericho Rosales, Bernard Palanca, Carlos Agassi, Roderick Paulate and Luis Manzano. It aired from February 15, 2005 to April 11, 2006, replacing Bida si Mister, Bida si Misis.

== Cast ==
- Piolo Pascual as PJ, he owns a bar in a Boracay where most of the people chill. He's uptight, smart, music lover, and adventurous. All he wants is a simple life. He is also known as the Tragic Lover Boy because most of his (ex) girlfriends leave him in the end.
- Diether Ocampo as Ditoy, a mixture of a Japanese and a Boracay-local Filipino. He's good at speaking Bisaya. He's also a Killer Playboy.
- Jericho Rosales as Alon, a messy, surfer, black-sheep, college drop-out who has no ambition at all. He has a different kind of taste when it comes to girls, he likes them weird.
- Bernard Palanca as Lenin, also the nephew of Marlon. A mysterious guy who has no sense of responsibility.
- Carlos Agassi as Caloy, the nephew of Marlon. He's a dumb dude, a virgin, and spends most of his time in body building.
- Roderick Paulate as Dodong, a gay manager of a hotel near PJs bar. The nemesis of Tita Yolly (Aunt Yolly).
- Luis Manzano as Luigi, a friend of PJ. He's a rich, self-centered, lover boy who loves jetskiing, weightboarding, and kiteboarding.
- Dennis Padilla as Marlon, the uncle of both Caloy and Lenin. A rich guy from Manila who has a mistress in Boracay and an ugly old wife in Manila.
- Caridad Sanchez as Tita Yolly, the aunt of PJ. She's an old-maid, snob, manager of rental cottages. Enemy of Dodong's father.
- Pauleen Luna as Paulette, cousin and helper of PJ in his bar.
- Pia Wurtzbach (billed as Pia Romero) as Pia, like Paulette, a cousin and helper of PJ.
- Bentong as Totong, owner of a boat. He also serves in PJs bar.
- Empoy, House boy and assistant cook of PJ.
- Gerhard Acao as Hercules, assistant and bodyguard of Dodong.
- Aubrey Miles as Mercy
- Jaymee Joaquin as Pechay.
- Joyce So as Lotus.
- Mickie Joy Hyatt as PamPam.
- Malaya Lewandowski

== See also ==
- List of programs broadcast by ABS-CBN
- My Papa Pi
