= Sineserye Presents =

2007–09 Philippine television drama series

- Genre: Romance; Soap opera
- Created by: ABS-CBN Corporation
- Starring: various
- Country of origin: Philippines
- Original language: Filipino
- No. of seasons: 2
- No. of episodes: 211

Production
- Running time: 30 minutes
- Production companies: Star Creatives; Dreamscape Entertainment

Original release
- Network: ABS-CBN
- Release: March 5, 2007 – October 2, 2009

Sineserye Presents is a Philippine television drama series broadcast by ABS-CBN. The series is a television adaptation of the Philippine films. It aired on the network's Primetime Bida line up and worldwide on TFC from March 5, 2007 to October 2, 2009, and was replaced by Pinoy Big Brother: Double Up.

== Origins ==
In 2005, ABS-CBN first used the term Sineserye when they launched the television series, Panday. They used it again when they aired the television series version of Bituing Walang Ningning. Kampanerang Kuba is also considered a Sineserye, although the said network called it a fantaserye. After 2 years of airing, ABS-CBN declared that Sineserye Presents has been officially cancelled on October 2, 2009, then two weeks ago the network decided to make a new afternoon drama for daytime Nagsimula sa Puso premiering October 12 until it ended on January 22, 2010.

== Programs ==
=== Season One ===
==== Palimos ng Pag-ibig ====
Air-date	March 5, 2007 – April 20, 2007
English Title	Begging for Love
Synopsis	In this dog-eat-dog world, you either have to stand up and carve a living for yourself or risk getting trampled by others in the rat race called life. This is the dilemma Ditas has faced each and every day of her life. Born to a destitute family, Ditas has resigned herself to the fact that her life will be a struggle; but, still having the strong resolve to make it in life, no matter what. As such, Ditas won't let her lowly stature in life hamper dreams of a promising future. She makes a living by selling her babies to the highest bidder, a lucrative job that was problem-free until a well-to-do couple approached her one-day and changed the rules of the game. The picture-perfect couple Rodel and Fina are young, good-looking, rich. The couple couldn't wish for anything more since they seemingly have everything anyone could ever want. With one exception. Both Rodel and Fina are eager to start a family; unfortunately for them, it's an impossibility as Fina's medical condition prohibits her from bearing children. When they hear rumors about a certain babymaker, who happens to be Ditas, the couple sees an opportunity to finally fill the void in their lives.
Director	Wenn V. Deramas and Andoy L. Ranay
Cast	Kristine Hermosa, Diether Ocampo, Rica Peralejo
Original Director	Eddie Garcia
Original Movie Cast	Vilma Santos, Edu Manzano, Dina Bonnevie

==== Hiram na Mukha ====
Air-date	April 23, 2007 – June 1, 2007
English Title	Borrowed Face
Synopsis	Famous plastic surgeon Dr. Hugo worships the ground his fiancée Alicia walks on. That is because he feels Alicia is his creation. From a monstrous carnival freak attraction, he has transformed her into a beautiful and glamorous woman. However, Alicia learns that beauty is not everything and she finds it hard to discern if people like her for herself or for her material wealth and beauty. She yearns to return to her former self, the ugly, monkey-faced Carissa because back then she was sure that people liked her for who she was and not due to her appearance. One such person was her former neighbour and lover, Mendez. Later on it is revealed that Mendez is, in fact, Dr. Hugo's grandson, and thus the former lovers take up where they have let off and plan a scam to get Dr. Hugo's money. The plan is that Alicia will wed Dr. Hugo and get him to transfer his properties under her name. Mendez will then kill his grandfather and then the lovers will live happily ever after. That is, if the doctor does not have a plan of his own- possibly as diabolical as their own.
Director	Erick C. Salud and Trina N. Dayrit
Cast	Heart Evangelista, Geoff Eigenmann, TJ Trinidad
Original Director	Joel Lamangan
Original Movie Cast	Nanette Medved, Cesar Montano, Christopher de Leon

==== May Minamahal ====
Air-date	June 4, 2007 – July 13, 2007
English Title	Loving Someone
Synopsis	Monica grew up in a male-dominated household. Her witty and free-spirited attitude caught the attention of Carlitos. He, on the other hand, lives in a female dominated household, where everyone depends on him. They start to get to know each other more everyday, hang out together and share each other’s feelings. And as they draw closer to each other, they start to fall in love. Little did they know that their family ties will be the factor that will make or break their budding relationship.
Director	Gilbert G. Perez and Nuel C. Naval
Cast	Anne Curtis, Oyo Sotto
Original Director	Jose Javier Reyes
Original Movie Cast	Aga Muhlach, Aiko Melendez

==== Natutulog Ba ang Diyos? ====
Air-date	July 16, 2007 – October 12, 2007
English Title	Is God Sleeping?
Synopsis	Everyone notices how different Andrew and Gillian look from their respective sets of parents but no one really makes a fuss about it. What is even more surprising is that the two have never felt close with the families they grew up with. Instead, Gillian becomes more closely attached to Andrew's parents and Andrew feels drawn to Gillian's parents, Bernardo and Patria. Little do they suspect that this is because Andrew and Gillian had been switched at birth. Andrew's real father, Bernardo, a poor private driver, decides that Andrew will have a better life growing up with his rich bosses. So he makes sure that only he and his wife Patria know that he has switched the two babies when the mothers both gave birth at a provincial hospital. No amount of pleading from Patria can make him change his mind. Out of frustration, Patria resorts to maltreating Gillian. The latter finds comfort with Andrew's mother, Rose, and later with Mark, a rich suitor. Jealous of Gillian's newfound attention, Andrew decides to force himself on Gillian, an act which leads to the revelation of the secret of their parentage.
Director	Jerry Lopez Sineneng and Rechie A. Del Carmen
Cast	Roxanne Guinoo, Jake Cuenca, Joross Gamboa with Dina Bonnevie
Original Director	Lino Brocka
Original Movie Cast	Lorna Tolentino, Ricky Davao, Gary Valenciano

=== Season Two: The Susan Roces Cinema Collection ===
==== Patayin sa Sindak si Barbara ====
Air-date	January 7, 2008 – January 25, 2008
English Title	Frighten Barbara to Death
Synopsis	All their lives, Barbara always gave way to her younger half-sister Ruth so she would be accepted by her new family. When they were older, she met Fritz and they instantly fell in love with each other. But Ruth also wants Fritz. She told them she would kill herself if Fritz would not marry her. So Barbara again gave way and made Fritz marry Ruth even with a heavy heart. She stayed in the States as a hospital nurse but one day she received a call from the Philippines saying that Ruth killed herself and it was witnessed by her only daughter Karen. She quickly came to the country to mourn with her stepmother and to take care of her currently unstable niece. But when she arrived, strange things start to happen. It seems that Ruth killed herself because of her paranoia that her husband is seeing Barbara in the States during his business trips. Ruth always knew that Fritz will always love Barbara and not her. To exact revenge on Barbara, she haunts the house through the doll, Chelsea and through her own daughter. She hurts and even kills all the people that is dear to Barbara until there is nobody left but Barbara herself.
Director	Jerry Lopez Sineneng and Gilbert G. Perez
Cast	Kris Aquino, Susan Roces, Jodi Sta. Maria, Albert Martinez
Original Director	Celso Ad. Castillo
Original Movie Cast	Susan Roces, Mary Walter, Rosanna Ortiz, Dante Rivero

==== Maligno ====
Air-date	April 28, 2008 – May 23, 2008
English Title	Supernatural
Synopsis	Angela was separated from her mother when she was just a baby because she is being hunted down by a satanic cult. Her parents want to be free from the cult but Angela is too precious for them to lose. Angela grew up to become a famous reporter who overly sensationalize her stories, one of which led to fatal results. Her life started to take a weird turn when one obsessed fan, Lucas, raped her. He was caught by the authorities but she realized she was already pregnant. She tried to abort the baby but her doctor, Hector gave her reasons not to commit another mistake. When the baby is born, Angela despised him at first, but loved him as time passes by. But the baby is not an ordinary baby, since his parents are not ordinary either.
Director	Wenn V. Deramas
Cast	Claudine Barretto, Diether Ocampo, Rafael Rosell, Kim Chiu, Gerald Anderson
Original Director	Celso Ad. Castillo
Original Movie Cast	Susan Roces, Dante Rivero, Celia Rodriguez, Eddie Garcia

==== Florinda ====
Air-date	September 7, 2009 – October 2, 2009
English Title	Florinda
Synopsis	Florinda is having a very romantic love-life with her lover, Ramil, until she met her mother-in-law Cristina who seems not to like her for her son. Although being hated by his mother, Matteo still chose Florinda, because of this, Cristina had a very deep grudge on her until in her breath in her deathbed. It was believed that, if a person had grudge in her deathbed, they will not rest in peace, yet they will haunt those they have anger to. For a long time after Cristina died. Ramil and Florinda decided to get married. On their wedding day, Florinda waited for a long time for her husband-to-be to arrive in the church, till she discovers that Matteo got involved in a car accident which caused him to die. Florinda suffers and mourns for her husband's death. But mourning is not enough, sooner or later, Ramil and Cristina's ghosts have started to haunt Florinda.
Director	Rahyan Q. Carlos
Cast	Maricel Soriano, Cherry Pie Picache, Jay Manalo
Original Director	Armando A. Herrera
Original Movie Cast	Susan Roces, Rosemarie Gil, Ramil Rodriguez

== See also ==
- List of programs broadcast by ABS-CBN
