= Babe, I Love You =

- Theatrical film poster
- Directed by: Mae Cruz-Alviar
- Screenplay by: Mia Bacarro; Margarette Labrador; King Palisoc; Ricardo Fernando III; Generiza F. Reyes
- Story by: Mia Bacarro; Margarette Labrador; King Palisoc
- Produced by: Charo Santos-Concio; Malou N. Santos; Vic del Rosario Jr.
- Starring: Anne Curtis; Sam Milby
- Cinematography: Charlie Peralta
- Edited by: Marya Ignacio
- Music by: Jessie Lasaten
- Production companies: ABS-CBN Film Productions; VIVA Films
- Distributed by: Star Cinema; VIVA Films
- Release date: April 3, 2010
- Running time: 101 minutes
- Country: Philippines
- Language: Filipino
- Box office: ₱96 million

Babe, I Love You is a 2010 Filipino romantic comedy film directed by Mae Cruz-Alviar and starring Anne Curtis and Sam Milby. It was produced by Viva Films and ABS-CBN Film Productions. This was Curtis' fourth movie after Wag Kang Lilingon (2006), Ang Cute ng Ina Mo! (2007) and When Love Begins (2008). It received mixed reviews from critics.

== Plot ==
In the academe, Nicolas “Nico” Veneracion Borromeo is a History of Architecture professor on his way to becoming the next Vice Dean of the Department. He knows that achieving this would finally make his mother proud of him and forgive him for indirectly causing his father’s death.

He meets an unconventional girl named Sandra “Sasa” Sanchez. He falls in love with someone who works as a promo-girl, and she is obviously unacceptable in his life.

== Cast ==
- Anne Curtis as Sandra "Sasa" Sanchez
- Sam Milby as Nicolas "Nico" Veneracion Borromeo
- Megan Young as Gaita Veneracion Borromeo
- AJ Perez † as Gian Veneracion Borromeo
- Guji Lorenzana as Jet
- Kitkat as Agnes
- Nikki Valdez as Chrissy
- Thou Reyes as BemBem
- Nikki Bacolod as KengKeng
- Angel Sy as TamTam
- CJ Jaravata as Tere
- Nicole Uysiuseng as Chloe
- Cheska Ortega as Ms. Wiez
- Niña Dolino as Monique
- Ricardo Cepeda as Bobby
- Shamaine Buencamino as Margarita
- Tetchie Agbayani as Lala Sanchez
- Leo Rialp as Dean Kintanar
- Laurice Guillen as Isabel Veneracion-Borromeo
- Roden Araneta † as Ibarra Gonzales

== Production ==
Film production started in 2009. The first teaser was released through Star Cinema's official YouTube account. The teaser was also shown in the theaters with Miss You Like Crazy. On March 11, 2010, a music video of the film was released again on Star Cinema's official YouTube account. It showed the singer of the theme song, Piolo Pascual and some scenes from the film.

== Reception ==
=== International screenings ===
Babe, I Love You was shown in select United States cities such as San Francisco, Cerritos, California, San Diego, Los Angeles, Las Vegas, Seattle, Chicago, Bergenfield, Honolulu and Guam. It also had screenings in Ontario, Abu Dhabi, Doha and Dubai.

=== Critical Reception ===
Critical reception was mixed. On Rotten Tomatoes, the film has an approval rating of 68%, based on 5 reviews.

=== Box office ===
This film was released on April 3, 2010 and it grossed ₱12 million pesos in its first day. As of May 2, 2010, the film grossed ₱96.34M, overtaking the Columbia Pictures with The Bounty Hunter, according to Box Office Mojo.
