= Nikki Bacolod =

Filipina actress and musician

Nikki Bacólod-Lopez
- Birth name: Monique Echieverri Bacólod
- Also known as: Nikki Bacólod-Lopez
- Born: August 18, 1989 (age 36); Iligan, Philippines
- Origin: De La Salle University
- Genres: Pop, OPM
- Occupations: Singer, actress, TV personality
- Years active: 2004–present
- Labels: Viva Records (2005–present); Star Magic (2004–2018); Viva Artists Agency (2008–present)
- Website: nikkibacolod.com

Nikki Bacólod-Lopez (born Monique Echieverri Bacólod on August 18, 1989), is a Filipino singer, television host, and actress. She is best known for placing as first runner up in the 2005 season of ABS-CBN's Search for the Star in a Million. As a result of her placing, she won a recording contract under VIVA Records, and thereafter released two albums, In Full Bloom and Not That Kind of Girl.

== Early life ==
Bacolod was born in Iligan. Growing up, she was an asthmatic. To strengthen her lungs, she learned swimming. By the time she was 15, she became a competitive swimmer, joining her team's varsity swim team. As a member of the swim team, she was able to go to school for free and send her sister to school with the money she earned from competitions. She also discovered her talent in singing, thanks to her strengthened lungs. She idolized singers such as Sarah Geronimo, Rachelle Ann Go, Regine Velasquez, Jojo, Britney Spears and Whitney Houston.

== Career ==
In 2005, when Bacolod was 15, she joined ABS-CBN's Search for the Star in a Million. She reached the grand finals, which was won by Jerome Sala. She was then signed by Viva Records. The following year, she released her debut album In Full Bloom.

In 2006, she was cast in the QTV show Posh as Nikki, a naïve but intelligent girl from the province who goes to Manila to pursue a scholarship. There, she was paired with PJ Valerio as a potential love team. However, their love team didn't work out, as she admitted that they didn't have chemistry.

Bacolod then hosted ABS-CBN's Kapamilya Winner Ka! and joined Pangarap na Bituin alongside Maja Salvador and Jay-R Siaboc. She also joined her first film, Ang Cute ng Ina Mo, and released another album, Not That Kind of Girl. In 2008, she was cast as the main villain to in Dyosa, which starred Anne Curtis. She also starred in the film Baler that year.

Bacolod continued to get more roles in television. She had roles in Imortal and P. S. I Love You. She also starred in several Maalala Mo Kaya (MMK) episodes throughout the 2010s.

In 2012, it was announced that Bacolod would be collaborating with a Malaysian artist. She then took a break from showbiz to focus on her studies. In 2015, it was revealed that she collaborated with Min Yasmin, as they released the duet "Sa Iyo".

== Filmography ==
=== Television ===
Year	Title	Role
2005	Search for a Star in a Million	Contestant
2005–2009	ASAP	Co-host / herself / performer
2006	Little Big Star Davao	Host
2006	Posh	Nikki
2006	Love to Love	
2007	Pangarap na Bituin	Abby Tugatog
2007–2008	Kapamilya Winner Ka!	Host
2008	Dyosa	Diana
2009	Daily Top 5	Host
2009	Midnight DJ	Demon
2009	Maalaala Mo Kaya: Tattoo	
2010	Habang May Buhay	Julie
2010	Rosalka	Shane Balbas
2010	Maalaala Mo Kaya: Wedding Ring	Jocelyn
2010	Maalaala Mo Kaya: Passbook	Kristine
2010	Imortal	Jessica Arceo
2011	Maalaala Mo Kaya: Wig	Gretchen
2011	Maalaala Mo Kaya: Itak	Jovel
2011	P. S. I Love You	Shirley
2018	Maalaala Mo Kaya: Sunflower	Jenn

=== Film ===
- 2012: Of All the Things as Princess Pamintuan
- 2010: Babe, I Love You as KengKeng
- 2009: You Changed My Life as Beng
- 2008: Baler as Lumeng
- 2007: Ang Cute ng Ina Mo as Lisa

== Discography ==
=== Solo albums ===
Date of release	Title	Album Sales Award
2006 VIVA Records	In Full Bloom	...
2007 VIVA Records	Not that Kind of Girl	...

== Personal life ==
Bacolod was born an asthmatic. She was also diagnosed with hypoparathyroidism, caused by a lack of calcium and since birth, gave her seizure and numbness attacks.

In college, Bacolod studied Bachelor of Arts Major in Behavioral Sciences and Bachelor of Science in Corporate Management at the College of St. Benilde. In 2019, she revealed that she was engaged to Miguel Lopez.

== Awards and recognition ==
- 2008 Metro Manila Film Festival, nominated for "Best Supporting Actress" for the film Baler
