= 2012 Box Office Entertainment Awards =

Annual Philippine entertainment awards

- Date: April 29, 2012
- Location: Manila

The 43rd Guillermo Mendoza Memorial Scholarship Foundation Box Office Entertainment Awards (GMMSF-BOEA) is a part of the annual awards in the Philippines held on April 29, 2012. The award-giving body honors Filipino actors, actresses and other performers' commercial success, regardless of artistic merit, in the Philippine entertainment industry.

== Winners selection ==
On April 14, the Guillermo Mendoza Memorial Scholarship Foundation board of jurors met in the Danes Publishing House, Mindanao Avenue in Quezon City and deliberated for this year's winners. They added two new categories: the "Phenomenal Box Office Star" which will be first received by Vice Ganda for his film The Unkabogable Praybeyt Benjamin; and the "Box Office Tandem" to Vic Sotto and Ai Ai delas Alas for collaborating in Enteng Ng Ina Mo film. The former received the highest box office returns in 2011, with ₱332 million gross, while the latter received the highest gross during the 2011 Metro Manila Film Festival, with ₱237.88 gross from December 25 to January 7.

The winners were chosen from the Top 10 Philippine films of 2011, top-rating shows in Philippine television, top recording awards received by singers, and top gross receipts of concerts and performances.

== Award ceremony ==
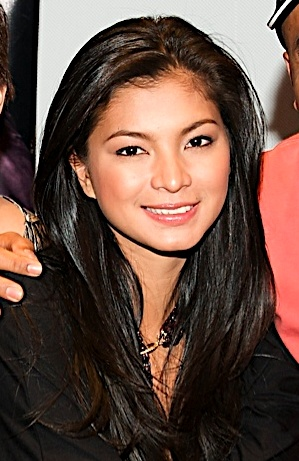
Angel Locsin, Film Actress of the Year winner.

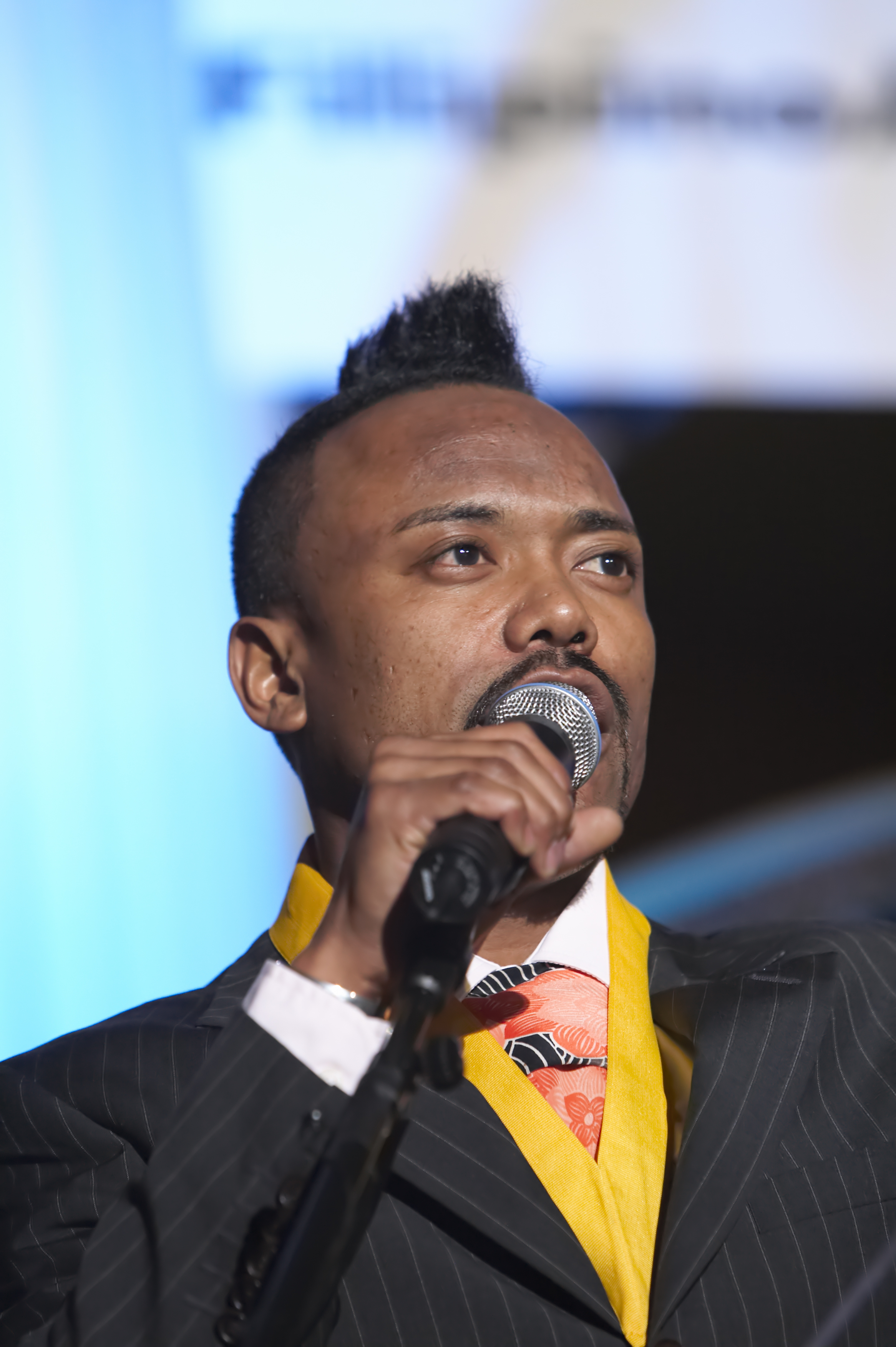
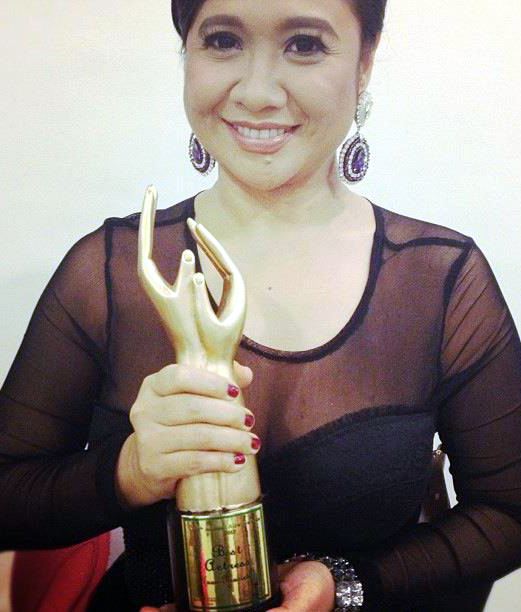
Apl De Ap (left) and Eugene Domingo (right), Global Achievement by a Filipino Artist and Comedy Actress of the Year winners.
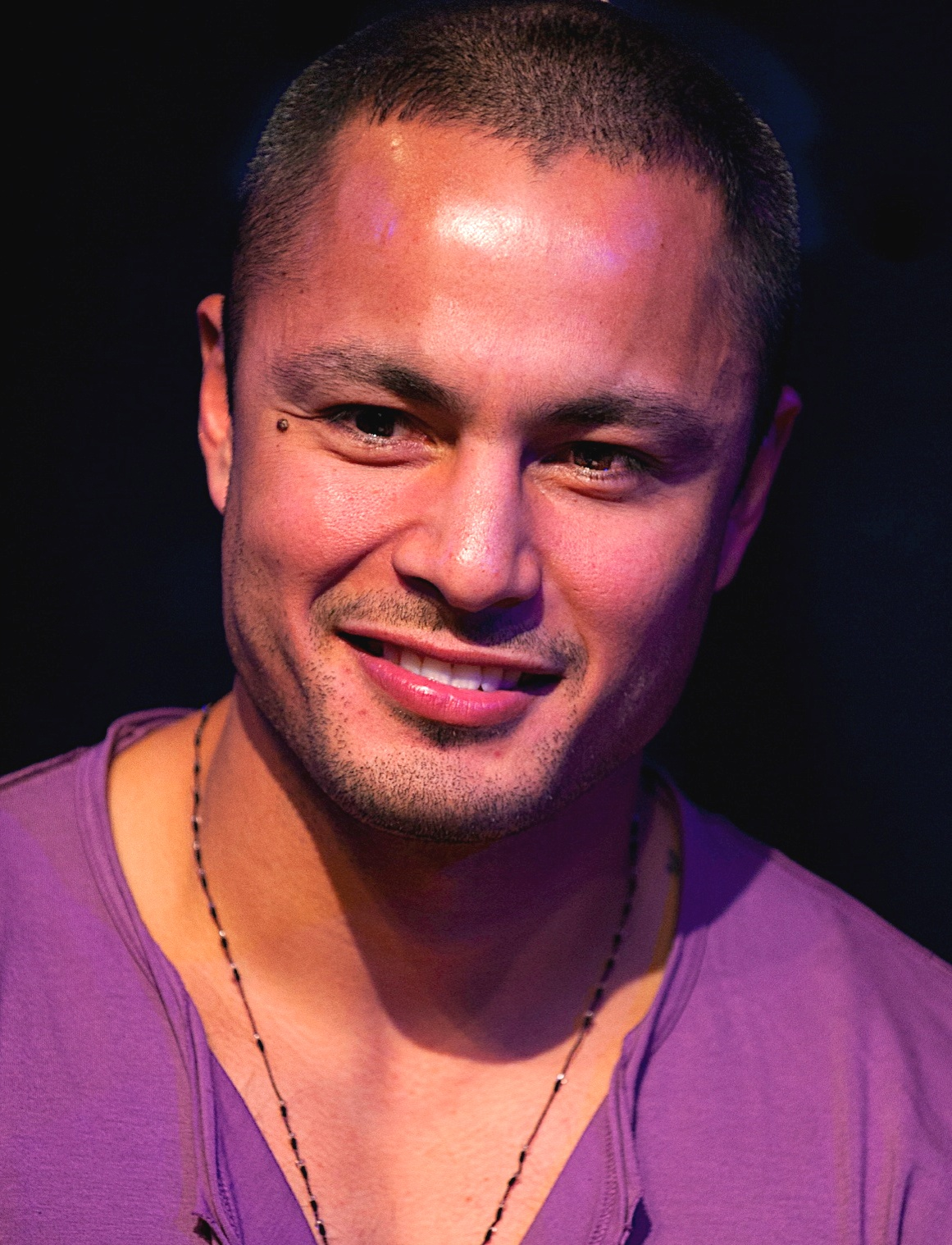
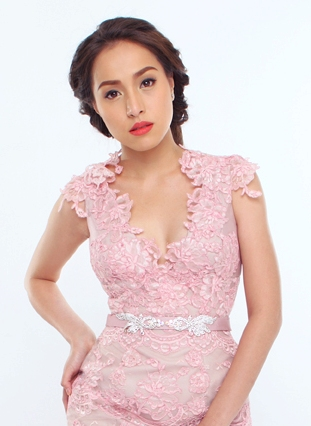
Derek Ramsay (left) and Cristine Reyes (right), Box Office King and Queen winners (with Anne Curtis).
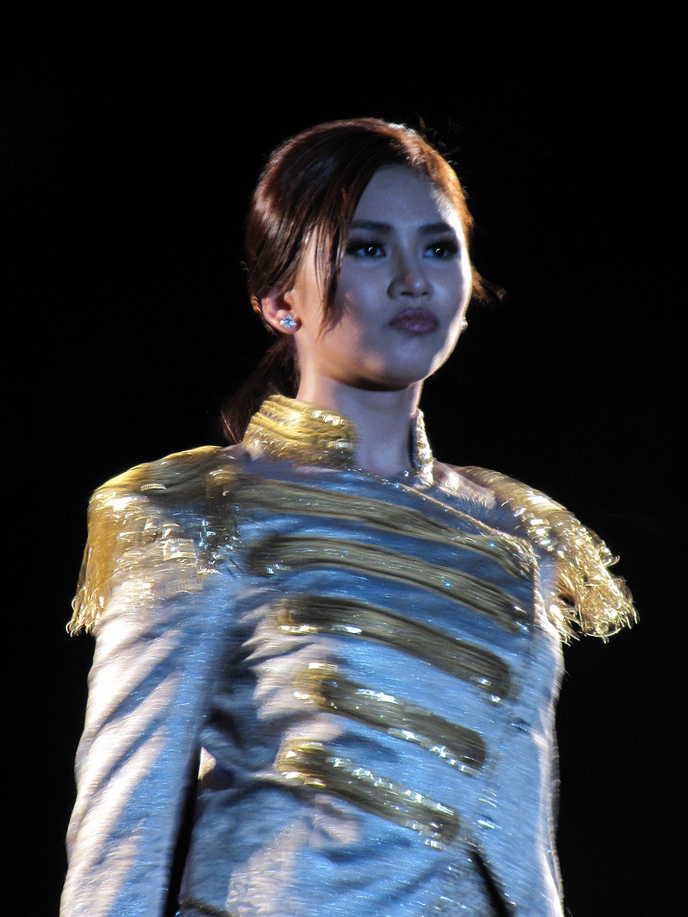
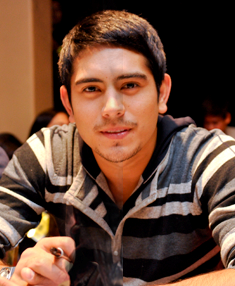
Sarah Geronimo (left) and Gerald Anderson (right), Princess and Prince of Philippine Movies winners.
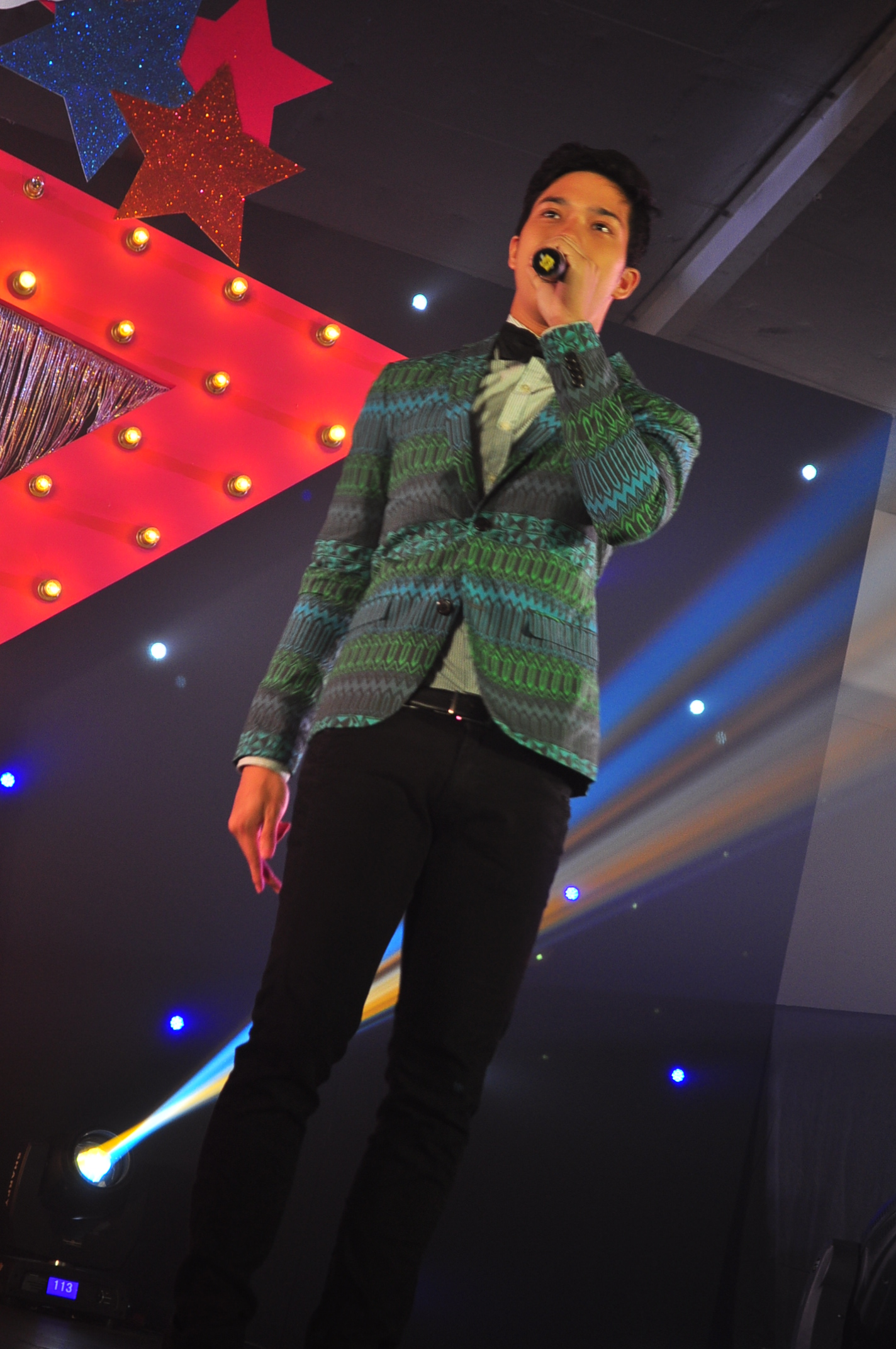
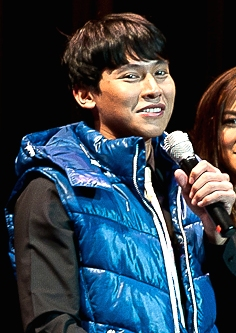
Elmo Magalona (left) and Enchong Dee (right), Promising Male Singer/Performer and Most Popular Loveteam in Movies and Television winners.

On April 29, 2012 at RCBC Plaza in Makati, Philippines, the 43rd Box Office Entertainment Awards night was held, produced by the Airtime Marketing of Tessie Celestino. The event will, then, be aired on May 6 at Sunday's Best on ABS-CBN.

=== Awards ===
==== Major awards ====
- Phenomenal Box Office Star - Vice Ganda (The Unkabogable Praybeyt Benjamin)
- Box Office King - Derek Ramsay (No Other Woman)
- Box Office Queens - Anne Curtis and Cristine Reyes (No Other Woman)
- Box Office Tandem - Vic Sotto and Ai Ai delas Alas (Enteng Ng Ina Mo)
- Male Concert Performer of the Year - Vice Ganda
- Female Concert Performer of the Year - Toni Gonzaga
- Male Recording Artist of the Year - Christian Bautista
- Female Recording Artist of the Year - Angeline Quinto

==== Film category ====
- Film Actor of the Year - Aga Muhlach (In the Name of Love)
- Film Actress of the Year - Angel Locsin (In the Name of Love)
- Prince of Philippine Movies - Gerald Anderson (Catch Me, I'm in Love)
- Princess of Philippine Movies - Sarah Geronimo (Catch Me, I'm in Love)
- Most Promising Male Star of the Year - Rocco Nacino
- Most Promising Female Star of the Year - Solenn Heussaff
- Most Popular Film Producers - Star Cinema and Viva Films
- Most Popular Film Director - Wenn Deramas (The Unkabogable Praybeyt Benjamin)
- Most Popular Screenwriter - Wenn Deramas and Keiko Aquino (The Unkabogable Praybeyt Benjamin)

==== Music category ====
- Promising Male Singer/Performer - Elmo Magalona
- Promising Female Singer/Performer - Julie Anne San Jose
- Most Popular Recording/Performing Group - Parokya ni Edgar
- Most Promising Recording/Performing Group - ASAP Boys R Boys
- Most Popular Male Novelty Singer - Jose Manalo and Wally Bayola
- Most Popular Female Novelty Singer - Anne Curtis (Annebisyosa)

==== Television category ====
- Prince of Philippine Television - Coco Martin (Minsan Lang Kita Iibigin - ABS-CBN)
- Princess of Philippine Television - Kim Chiu (My Binondo Girl - ABS-CBN)
- Most Popular Loveteam in Movies and Television - Enchong Dee and Erich Gonzales (ABS-CBN)
- Most Promising Loveteam for Movies and TV - Bea Binene and Jake Vargas (GMA-7)
- Most Popular Male Child Performer - Bugoy Cariño (100 Days to Heaven - ABS-CBN)
- Most Popular Female Child Performer - Xyriel Manabat (100 Days to Heaven - ABS-CBN)
- Most Popular TV Program News & Public Affairs - 24 Oras (GMA-7)
- Most Popular TV Program Drama Series - 100 Days to Heaven (ABS-CBN)
- Most Popular TV Program Musical Variety - Eat Bulaga! (GMA-7)
- Most Popular TV Program Talent Search/Reality - Talentadong Pinoy (TV5)

==== Special awards ====
- Bert Marcelo Lifetime Achievement Award - Jose Manalo and Wally Bayola
- Comedy Actor of the Year - John Lapus
- Comedy Actress of the Year - Eugene Domingo
- Outstanding Government Service Award - Laguna Governor ER Ejercito
- Global Achievement by a Filipino Artist - Apl De Ap

== Multiple awards ==
=== Individuals with multiple awards ===
The following individual names received two or more awards:

Awards	Name
2	Vice Ganda
2	Anne Curtis
2	Wenn Deramas

*Note: Special Award winners are not included.

=== Companies with multiple awards ===
The following companies received two or more awards in the television category:

Awards	Company
6	ABS-CBN
2	GMA-7
