= When Love Begins =

- Theatrical movie poster
- Directed by: Jose Javier Reyes
- Screenplay by: Jose Javier Reyes
- Story by: Jose Javier Reyes; Kriz G. Gazmen; Tammy Bejerano (uncredited)
- Based on: Concept by Jewel Castro
- Produced by: Charo Santos-Concio; Malou Santos; Vic Del Rosario Jr.
- Starring: Aga Muhlach; Anne Curtis
- Cinematography: Rodolfo Aves Jr.
- Edited by: Vito Cajili
- Music by: Jesse Lucas
- Production companies: Star Cinema; Viva Films
- Distributed by: Star Cinema
- Release date: April 30, 2008
- Running time: 105 minutes
- Country: Philippines
- Language: Filipino
- Box office: ₱89,380,000.00

When Love Begins is a 2008 Philippine romance film written and directed by Jose Javier Reyes and starring Aga Muhlach and Anne Curtis. A co-production of Star Cinema and Viva Films, the film was released on April 30, 2008. This was Curtis' third movie after Wag Kang Lilingon (2006) and Ang Cute ng Ina Mo! (2007)

== Plot ==
Benedicto "Ben" Caballero (Aga Muhlach) is an environmentalist who disapproves of deforestation for villages in mountainous regions in the country. He is more concerned of the environment than that of getting along with his siblings. It is revealed that he was a former lawyer and that he quit because of a matter between right or wrong, and not about winning or losing. He focuses on nature - for him, it's all about saving the planet.

He visits Boracay and meets Michelle "Mitch" Valmonte (Anne Curtis) after an accident. Mitch is a carefree party girl who works for her father's company. She and Ben get to know each other and develop special interests for each other.

But making a relationship without any commitment is one problem they both have to deal with. It goes well at first, but the relationship ends because of its impossibilities.

Ben then discovers that Mitch's father owns the company that ordered the deforestation and construction of a new village in which he is against. This leads them separate ways and they try to forget about their so-called relationship.

== Cast ==
=== Main cast ===
- Aga Muhlach as Ben Caballero
- Anne Curtis as Mitch Valmonte

=== Supporting cast ===
- Boots Anson-Roa as Marietta Caballero
- Ronaldo Valdez as Leo Caballero
- Jon Avila as Wally
- AJ Dee as Greg
- Christopher de Leon as Paco Valmonte
- Desiree Del Valle as Raisa
- Gemma Fitzgerald as Lisa
- Angel Jacob as Marides Caballero
- Davey Langit as Mitoy
- Jennifer Lee as Sandra
- Alma Lerma as Yaya Gloria
- Dionne Monsanto as Nena
- Mads Nicolas as Mommy Offie
- Mandy Ochoa as Anton Caballero
- Mickey Perz as Caleb
- Dimples Romana as Carrie Caballero
- Rafael Rosell as Alger
- Riza Santos as Christine
- Gail Nicolas as Sharmaine
- Mark Manicad as Jeffrey

== Reception ==
The Star Cinema and Viva Films' romantic drama When Love Begins has already grossed ₱69,277,632.90 on its first two weeks of running. Its total gross is ₱89,380,000.
