= Andre Garcia (actor) =

Filipino actor (born 1999)

- Born: Joseph Andre Garcia; October 23, 1999 (age 26); Davao City, Philippines
- Other names: Andre Garcia, Chubbs
- Occupations: Actor, commercial model
- Years active: 2007–present
- Agent(s): Star Magic (2007–2021)

Joseph Andre Garcia (born October 23, 1999) is a Filipino male actor. He is best known for playing Chubbs in the television series Kung Fu Kids. He also appeared in the series Dyosa, On the Wings of Love, and #ParangNormal Activity.

== Career ==
He first appeared on television when he was 5 years old. During summer vacation, he started as a product endorser and commercial model and made several commercials. His most recent projects were in ABS-CBN's Kung Fu Kids and Dyosa.

During the taping of Kung Fu Kids (KFK), it usually takes him about 34 takes to perfect one action sequence. But Enrico Santos, KFK Business Unit head quickly clarifies that "It is not a question of Chubbs' ability as a kid actor, because he is very good, convincing." "The show just requires much more from everyone -- the production to the creative teams to the cast. "

== Appearances ==
At the early age of five, Andre Garcia started his career on the television . He became a commercial model and product endorser. He also appeared on the television as TV guest in ABS-CBN programs, like in the Boy & Kris, ASAP '08, Wowowee, Wonder Mom, Entertainment Live, etc. Also, he made several mallshows around Metro Manila and provinces together with the other cast of Kung Fu Kids.

=== Kung Fu Kids (2008) ===
Kung Fu Kids is the first live anime fantaserye series of Andre Garcia. He played the role of Chester “Chubbs” Trinidad also known as Kid Chubby. He is the lovable son of Mr. Thomas Trinidad (Christopher Roxas) and Mrs. Lydia Trinidad (Arlene Muhlach). Also, he is the best friend of Waldo "Lembot/ Lem" Ramos Jr (Jairus Aquino). In this series, he has the ability to make any force applied to his tummy bounce back to repel enemies and has his fighting style of a turtle. Among the eight Kung Fu Kids, he is the only one that don't have a weapon. His attack chant is "Super Chao Bite and Supreme Siopao Attack".

=== A Very Special Love (2008) ===
After the Kung Fu Kids, Andre Garcia got his first movie entitled A Very Special Love starring John Lloyd Cruz and Sarah Geronimo. In this movie, he played the role of the younger brother of Sarah Geronimo.

=== Dyosa ===
Andre Garcia got his second time on ABS-CBN fantaserye television series which Dyosa starring Anne Curtis, Sam Milby, Luis Manzano and Zanjoe Marudo. In this drama series, he is playing the role of Venus son of Huling (Rubi Rubi) and Miong (Jojit Lorenzo) and a younger brother of Josephine (Ann Curtis). His name in this fantaserye is feminine because according to the story, his mother, Huling, thought that she will give birth to a female child so they gave him the name of Venus.

== Filmography ==
=== Film ===
Year	Title	Role
2008	A Very Special Love	Lio Magtalas
2009	You Changed My Life	Lio Magtalas
2010	Hating Kapatid	Joseph
2013	It Takes a Man and a Woman	Lio Magtalas
2017	Dear Other Self	Young Chris
2020	Boyette: Not a Girl Yet	Brett Camacho

=== Television ===
Year	Title	Role
2008	Kung Fu Kids	Chester "Chubbs" Trinidad (Kid Chubby)
2008	Dyosa	Venus
2008–2013	Goin' Bulilit	as himself
2009	Tiagong Akyat	young Jigo
2010	Tanging Yaman	young Epi
2010	Maalaala Mo Kaya: Bahay	Andrei
2010	Wansapanataym: Nato De Coco	Bong
2010	Maalaala Mo Kaya: Seaweeds	Young Rodel
2010	Kokey @ Ako	Baldo
2011	Green Rose	Bullet
2011	Mula sa Puso	Young Gabriel
2011	Wansapanataym: Housemates Ni Lola	Jigs Villafuerte
2011	Reputasyon	Jun-jun Delos Santos
2011	Angelito: Batang Ama	young Angelito
2012	Walang Hanggan	Young Tomas
2012	A Beautiful Affair	Young Leon
2015	#ParangNormal Activity	Red
2015	On the Wings of Love	Jordan Medina
2016	Doble Kara	Teenage Edward
2017	Wildflower	Young Raul Torillo
2017	Maalaala Mo Kaya: Kwek-Kwek	Young Randy
2018	Bagani	Tukmol
2018	Ipaglaban Mo!: Uliran	David
2019	Maalaala Mo Kaya: Steak	Cherence Go
2019	Ipaglaban Mo!: Sabik	Paul
2019–2020	Story of My Life	Classmate
2025	Rainbow Rumble	Contestant
