= Just a Stranger =

Filipino drama romance film

- Theatrical release poster
- Directed by: Jason Paul Laxamana
- Produced by: Vic R. Del Rosario Jr.
- Starring: Anne Curtis; Marco Gumabao
- Cinematography: Takeyuki Onishi
- Edited by: Mai Calapardo
- Music by: Paulo Protacio
- Production company: Viva Films
- Distributed by: Viva Films
- Release date: August 21, 2019
- Running time: 117 minutes
- Country: Philippines
- Language: Filipino
- Box office: ₱100 million

Just a Stranger is a 2019 Filipino erotic romantic drama film by Viva Films written and directed by Jason Paul Laxamana, starring Anne Curtis and Marco Gumabao. It was filmed in Lisbon, Portugal and it was released in the Philippines on August 21, 2019.

== Plot ==
A story of a woman and a man, half of her age being in love with each other despite the fact that they are both tied with someone else.

== Cast ==
- Anne Curtis as Mae
- Marco Gumabao as Jericho
- Edu Manzano as Phil Pimentel
- Cherie Gil as Hilda Sarsuelo
- Robert Seña as Rufi
- Isay Alvarez as Judy
- Ana Abad Santos as Charlene
- Menggie Cobarrubias as Gov. Roy
- Danita Paner as Kim
- C.J. Javarata as Vian
- Carl Guevara as Warren
- Pio Balbuena as Dorian
- Josef Elizalde
- Abby Bautista as Nat
- Seira Briones as Liz
- Jas Rodriguez
- Jasmine Hollingworth as Febbie

== Controversy ==
Anne Curtis received backlash from netizens after posting the movie poster on Instagram last August 20, a day before the premiere of the film. The poster featured a daring image of Curtis and Gumabao. People began commenting how inappropriate it was for a married lady and that she should no longer accept such sexy roles. Her husband, Erwan Heussaff, came to the actress' defense, saying that there is "no need to throw around words like disrespect or dictate what a person should or shouldn’t do after getting married.” He added that the "hilarious comments" are sexist. "If this was a married guy actor doing love scenes, no one would have any issue with it,” he said.
