= Kung Fu Kids =

2008 Philippine television fantasy series

- Title card
- Genre: Comedy; Action; Fantasy; Adventure
- Created by: ABS-CBN Studios
- Written by: Cenon Palomares; Wali Ching; Randy Q. Villanueva; Raymond Dimayuga; Christian Vidallo; Karen Gatdula; Kayelyn Jusay; Fionna Acaba; Janice O'Hara; Rhoda Tanyag; Sonia Pascual
- Directed by: Malu L. Sevilla; Richard I. Arellano
- Starring: Jairus Aquino; Andre Garcia; Eliza Pineda; Sharlene San Pedro; Paul Salas; Jane Oineza; Kristoffer Martin; Joshua Dionisio
- Opening theme: "Kung Fu Fighting" by Rocksteddy and Gloc-9
- Country of origin: Philippines
- Original language: Filipino
- No. of episodes: 63

Production
- Executive producers: Carlo Katigbak; Cory Vidanes; Laurenti Dyogi; Enrico C. Santos
- Producers: Sheila Marie Ocampo; Jose Antonio Giullero; Roldeo T. Endrinal; Raymund Dizon
- Running time: 30-45 minutes
- Production companies: Dreamscape Entertainment Television; ECS Creatives

Original release
- Network: ABS-CBN
- Release: January 28 – April 25, 2008

Kung Fu Kids is a 2008 Philippine television drama fantasy series broadcast by ABS-CBN. Directed by Malu L. Sevilla and Richard I. Arellano, it stars Jairus Aquino, Andre Garcia, Eliza Pineda, Sharlene San Pedro, Paul Salas, Jane Oineza, Kristoffer Martin and Joshua Dionisio. It aired on the network's Primetime Bida line up and worldwide on TFC from January 28 to April 25, 2008, replacing Mars Ravelo's Lastikman and was replaced by The Singing Bee.

== Plot ==
Kung Fu Kids is about friendship, love for family, and courage. The destined kids are led by Lembot, the weakest and least confident of the bunch. Taught about friendship, love for family and happiness, the Kung Fu Kids trained under the village idiot who turns out to be a Kung Fu master from China, and they've developed the abilities that enable them to fight the forces of evil. They fight many battles and defend their loved ones from evil. To be able to do best, they rely on discipline and focus. Under the rules of the Kung Fu Master, Lembot trains with other Kung Fu Kids to fight the forces of evil. See how challenging it would be as these exceptional kids deal with serious family issues and enjoy their lives as children while saving the world in secret. The kid's desire to learn martial arts led him to be in the middle of an ancient battle until everyone close to him, his family and friends were placed in danger. What is the connection of Fei and Master Kung to Lembot and the crazy man? Wu Lee also tasks Kung to hide the ruby heart of Shen Li Liang, a shining sacred jewel and a student named Fei sacrifices his life in protecting the Shen Li Liang. The Kung Fu Kids summon the red dragon to combine their powers together by the red heart.

== Cast and characters ==
=== Main cast ===
- Jairus Aquino as Waldo "Lembot" Ramos (Kid Weakling)/Fish Boy/Fei - has the ability to perceive slow motion and has the fighting style of an eagle. His main weapon are a pair of tonfa. His catchphrase is: "One... Two... Lipad (Fly)!".
- Andre Garcia as Chester "Chubbs" Trinidad (Kid Chubby) - has the ability to make any force applied to his tummy bounce back and has the fighting style of a turtle. He is the only Kung Fu Kid without a weapon. His catchphrase is: "Super Chao Bite and Supreme Siopao Attack!".
- Eliza Pineda as Saranelle "Sarah" Magalang (Kid Simple) - has the ability to hear distant noises despite her poor eyesight and has the fighting style of a stingray. Her main weapon is a parasol. Her catchphrase is: "Pulsar Payong (Umbrella)!".
- Paul Salas as Leonardo "Uragon" De Vela (Kid Leader) - has the ability of super strength and has the fighting style of a bull. His main weapon is a pair of arnis. His catchphrase is: "Seismic Sipa (Kick)!".
- Jane Oineza as Moiranielle "Moira" Ocampo (Kid Maarte) - has the ability to control frogs through the power of "pambabarang" that she adopted from Crispin and has the fighting style of a frog. Her main weapon is a lasso. Her catchphrase is: "Lashing Laso (Ribbon)!". She is later revealed to be Benjo's half-sister.
- Kristoffer Martin as Benjamin "Benjo" Reyes (Kid Bully) - has no ability gifted with the sixth sense and has the fighting style of a scorpion. His main weapon is a pair of nunchaku. His catchphrase is: "Shadow Sipit (Claw)!". He is later revealed to be Moira's half-brother.
- Joshua Dionisio as Jaizer "Jazz" Marasigan (Kid Judas) - has the ability to control/ manipulate energy blasts through his hands and has the fighting style of a whale. His main weapon is a bō staff. His catchphrase is: "Tsunami Sapak (Punch)!".
- Darien O'Dell as Maneki/The 8th Kung Fu Kid - has the fighting style of a dragon. His catchphrase is: "Crouching Kalmot (Scratch)!". Darien O'Dell acted as Maneki's human form.

=== Supporting cast ===
- Sid Lucero as Master Kung Lee (Kung-Krung) - Uses the power of a horse, cheetah and jaguar and he is also the one responsible for calling the Kung Fu Kids.
- Gerard Pizarras as Macoy Ramos/Ferdinand Fernandez (Fisherman) - the main antagonist of the series. He is the brother of Waldo, father of Baby and stepfather of Gian (Father is Master Kung Lee)
- Matteo Guidicelli as Gian Marasigan Fernandez - Cousin of Lem and Baby and son of Kung Lee
- Erich Gonzales as Nicole "Nick" Magalang - sister of Sarah
- Wowie de Guzman as Waldo Ramos Sr. - brother of Macoy, father of Lem and stepfather of Baby. For his strictness towards his son, he filled with his own anger at first but he reconciled with Lem and Baby and at the series finale, he forgave them for what he had done to the kids during the funeral of Anita
- Cheska Billiones as Baby Ramos - half-sister of Lem, daughter of Macoy A.K.A. Fisherman and stepdaughter of Waldo
- Allen Dizon as Congressman Adrian Ocampo - father of Moira and Abby. He is also the father of Benjo.
- Christopher Roxas as Thomas Trinidad - Father of Chubbs
- Kian Kazemi as Teban (deceased)
- Arlene Muhlach as Mrs. Lydia Trinidad - mother of Chubbs
- Yayo Aguila (Pinoy Big Brother: Celebrity Edition 2) as Mrs. Ocampo - Mother of Moira and Abby
- Izza Ignacio as Mrs. Magalang - Mother of Nikki and Sarah
- Hero Bautista as Mr. Selon Magalang - Father of Nikki and Sarah
- Mickey Ferriols as Melisa "Lisa" De Vela - mother of Uragon
- Bong Revilla as Diether Martin "Diether" De Vela - father of Uragon
- Mariel Rodriguez as Elena Marasigan Fernandez - girlfriend/wife of Macoy and Kung Lee and mother of Gian
- Asia Agcaoili as Sheila - former ally of the Fisherman (deceased)
- Jhong Hilario as Kevin Marilao - former ally of the Fisherman
- Ina Feleo as Sister Mona
- Isabel Blaesi - Karen Alvarez - ex-girlfriend of Gian (deceased)
- Noemi Oineza as Abigail "Abby" Ocampo - sister of Moira and half-sister of Benjo.
- Thou Reyes as Crispin
- Monsour del Rosario as Yuen - Uncle of Beng - descendant of Men Tang
- Blake Nepomuceno as Rudolfo "Rudy"
- Jacq Yu as Miranda/Carmen Santiago - right-hand of Macoy and Benjo's mom (deceased) and the mother of Benjo
- Janice Hung as Kim (deceased)
- Michael Roy Jornales as Beng (deceased)
- Mark Joshua Sayarot as Xander De Vela - has the ability to paralyze people with static through his hands and has the fighting style of a snake. He's Uragon's half-brother (deceased).
- Gee-Ann Abrahan as Kizhia

=== Special participation ===
- Jiro Manio as Young Macoy
- John Manalo as Young Waldo
- Jodi Sta. Maria as Mrs. Anita C. Ramos (deceased) - Mother of Lem and Baby
- Vice Ganda as Hum the Horse -The Saver of Kids who encountered the protagonists when the kids did not know they have superpowers
- Precious Lara Quigaman as Shen Li Liang - The Golden Statue Goddess
- Menggie Cobarrubias as Sen. Federico Alvarez - Karen's father
- Jordan Herrera as Men Tang
- Cristy Fermin as voice of Maneki Neko (Golden Cat Statue) - Maneki assumes a human form and joins the Kung Fu Kids
- Ervin Bobadilla as The Owner of Magic Crystal
- Ogie Diaz as voice of Maneganeki Maneko (Black Cat Statue)
- Makisig Morales as voice of Borat 1 (Red)
- Rhap Salazar as voice of Borat 2 (Orange) Replaced by Pocholo Gonzales
- Lolita Tamayo as Lourdes "Olud" Ramos - Grandma of Lem, Baby, and Gian
- Alannah Ong as Ma Bang
- Lindsay Custodio as Fiona - Guardian of Mt. Banahaw Lake and Chalice of Life
- Richard Quan as Joselito De Vela - Father of Uragon and Xander (deceased)
- Michelle Salas as Mrs. Alyson De Vela - Mother of Xander
- Japoy Lizardo as Shao - Ally of Yuen, Brother of Fei. He teaches Lem his Kung Fu skills.(deceased)
- Nanding Josef as Mr. Ong
- Mark Gil as Master Wu Lee - father of Kung Lee
- Jana Aveleda & Jenny Aveleda as Cornelia and Ophelia De Vela - Twin Sisters/Cousins of Uragon
- Chiqui del Carmen as Brent
- Kitkat as Malena - Mermaid (knows where to locate the vanishing island)
- Sharlene San Pedro as Reyna Ungga Ungga - A tribe leader: Queen in the island of "isle submerge appear (islang lulubog lilitaw)" and has the fighting style of a monkey
- Erika Anissa Yu as Princess

== Terminology ==
=== Six Magical Items that Shen Li Liang Needs ===
- Sitar - a guitar-like musical instrument from India that hypnotizes anyone who hears its sound.
- Golden Scarab of Jafar (Scarab ni Jafar) - a beetle from Ancient Egypt that takes control of humans and makes them be abused with power. For it to turn back to a stone it must be used for good.
- Chalice of life (Kupita ng Buhay) - a cup from Europe that if anyone drinks from it he or she will be immortal as long as how many times it is drunk and also heals sickness.
- Magical Lotus Flower (Mahiwagang Bulaklak ng Lotus) - a lotus-like object that can bring inanimate objects to life.
- Scythe of Death (Karit ni Kamatayan) - a black scythe from Japan that turns into an ordinary sickle or a black toga that cannot be taken off when held by a person. It tells a prophecy when a person dies. The only way to take it off is to surrender it to Shen Li Liang. Lem is the fishboy that wears the toga of death to become an Angel of Death, he has the power to foretell anyone who is about to die to have a power of the sickle.
- Skeleton Key (Kalansay na Susi) - a key of a pirate that can transport anyone to a desirable place. The key has a special power - to see the answer that one's heart has so long to find.

=== Lem's transfiguration ===
Only Lem can see the mark X with someone's forehead

1. Teban: Chief shoots Teban's back in front of Waldo Sr. with Lem.
2. Miranda: Miranda dies from a fight with Yuen to protect her son, Benjo.
3. Chubbs: He was caught in a fight by bullies but survived when Lem surrendered the Scythe of Death to Shen Li Liang.

=== Other ===
- Onyx heart of Shen Li Liang
- Ruby heart of Shen Li Liang
- Jade heart of Shen Li Liang

=== Master Kung tells stories ===
Master Kung with Fei (Flashback)/Kung Fu Kids

- Onyx & Ruby hearts - (Onyx, Ruby, and Jade hearts) - Master Kung tells Lem about Shen Li Liang. Mr. Ong has a figurine with an Onyx heart, Lem gets it out from Fish Aquarium and gives it to Master Kung. Master Kung has a Ruby heart to give Lem to keep. Someone took the Jade heart from the boy.
- Golden Scarab of Jafar - Flying to find Lem looked like Fei to control it.
- Chalice of life - According to Xander's story Fiona had the Chalice of life/the Kung Fu Kids were heading to Mt. Banahaw with Master Kung.
- Magical Lotus Flower - the Kung Fu Kids go to a Festival for something that has a Lotus Flower with Master Kung.
- Scythe of Death - Shao told Lem about the Scythe. Lem goes with Master Kung to his Grandma's house which has a black scythe or sickle.
- Skeleton key - Master Kung tells Lem the story of the Skeleton Key. Master Kung tells Lem that the skeleton key can be found in an island that appears, disappears, then appears. Maneki tells Lem and the other Kung Fu Kids that they can consult the only mermaid who only knows where the disappearing island is. - the Kung Fu Kids go to the Island with Kevin to find the Mermaid. Master Kung gave it to Reyna to keep waiting for fishboy.

== Reception ==
The show is currently the most-watched program in urban Philippines according to NUTAM, with 37.1%. In addition, the show got 26.6% on its pilot episode in the Mega Manila area.

== Kung Fu Kids songs ==
- "Habambuhay" by Yeng Constantino
- "Pagsubok" by Orient Pearl
- "Kung Fu Fighting" by Rocksteddy and Gloc-9 - theme song
- "Kasama" by Ice Seguerra
- "One Day in Your Life" by Michael Jackson - sung by Benjo in the outreach episode
- "Haplos" by Shamrock

== Production credits ==
- Director: Malu Sevilla
- Overall In-Charge of Production: Enrico Santos, Roldeo Endrinal
- Production Manager: Raymund Dizon
- Headwriters: Cenon Palomares, Wali Ching
- Creative Team: Randy Q. Villanueva, Raymond Dimayuga, Christian Vidallo, Karen Gatdula, Kayelyn Jusay, Fionna Acaba, Janice O'Hara, Rhoda Tanyag, Sonia Pascual
- Concept By: Richard Reynante, Bridgette Ann Rebuca, Angelo Roxas, Bendel Timtim
