= Green Rose (Philippine TV series) =

2011 Philippine television drama series

- Title card
- Genre: Drama; Romance; Action; Suspense
- Based on: Green Rose by Yoo Hyun-mi
- Written by: Noreen Capili; Raymund Diamzon; Marietta M. Lamasan; Siegfred B. Sanchez; Mariami Tanangco-Domingo
- Directed by: Dondon S. Santos; Manny Q. Palo; Darnel Joy R. Villaflor
- Starring: Jericho Rosales; Anne Curtis; Jake Cuenca; Alessandra de Rossi
- Opening theme: "Bumuhos Man ang Ulan" by Jericho Rosales
- Original languages: Filipino; Korean
- No. of episodes: 73

Production
- Executive producers: Roldeo T. Endrinal; Arnel T. Nacario
- Production locations: Philippines; South Korea
- Running time: 30-45 minutes
- Production company: Dreamscape Entertainment Television

Original release
- Network: ABS-CBN
- Release: February 14 – May 27, 2011

Green Rose is a 2011 Philippine television drama series broadcast by ABS-CBN. The series is based on the 2005 South Korean drama series of the same title. Directed by Dondon S. Santos, Manny Q. Palo and Darnel Joy R. Villaflor, it stars Jericho Rosales, Anne Curtis, Jake Cuenca and Alessandra De Rossi. It aired on the network's Primetime Bida line up and worldwide on TFC from February 14 to May 27, 2011, replacing Precious Hearts Romances Presents: Kristine and was replaced by The Biggest Loser: Pinoy Edition.

== Overview ==
=== Adaptation ===
Green Rose is a remake of the 2005 Korean drama, Green Rose produced by SBS and was distributed in the Philippines by ABS-CBN. The remake stars Jericho Rosales as Jerome Delgado, Anne Curtis as Angela Tuazon, Jake Cuenca as Edward Fuentebuella, and Alessandra de Rossi as Geena Rallos.

=== Synopsis ===
Jerome Delgado has been offered the dream job that has also been the part of his life. Jerome becomes part of the SR group of companies. In this predicament, he will meet Angela Tuazon, a young woman who he meets in his new environment. Both come from different worlds and circumstances, but after a fateful business ride turns into a disaster as their cargo truck breaks down, the two find themselves getting to know each other after a night in the woods. Jerome and Angela fall in love, but beyond people's beliefs and personal wants and needs, the two will go through obstacles leaving Jerome framed up in a situation he did not even plan or know of, as Angela fights hard to believe that their love can go beyond the threats. Will Jerome escape the prejudices and pains of a crime he never commit?

A beautiful new tale of a story of how far one will go to reclaim the love, name, and honor, that goes beyond existence.

== Cast and characters ==
=== Main cast ===
- Jericho Rosales as Jerome Delgado / Lee Jung-Soo
- Anne Curtis as Angela Tuazon
- Jake Cuenca as Edward Fuentebella
- Alessandra de Rossi as Geena Rallos

=== Supporting cast ===
- Susan Africa as Linda Reyes-Delgado
- Gardo Versoza as David Tobias
- Ricardo Cepeda as Ricardo Tuazon
- Leo Rialp as Lito Cruz
- Janus del Prado as Johnson Bayoran
- Simon Ibarra as Ruben Torillo
- Ping Medina as Ariel Fernandez
- Smokey Manaloto as Nelson de Guia

=== Extended cast ===
- Edgar Sandalo as Freddie Ramos
- Jong Cuenco as Atty. Fidel Santos
- Menggie Cobarrubias as Atty. Rogelio Yumul
- Raymond Concepcion as Atty. Roberto Plata
- Raymond Lim as Nestor Castor
- Gio Marcelo as Juanito Limbaga
- Greggy Santos as Francis
- Pica Lozano as Joseph
- Andrei Garcia as Bullet
- Joyce So as Lingling

=== Special participation ===
- Albert Martinez as Darren Lee
- Carla Guevarra as Sofia Tuazon
- Froilan Sales as Danny Crisostomo
- Gilette Sandico as Nelia Parcon-Crisostomo
- Veyda Inoval as Young Angela
- Jacob Dionisio as Young Edward

== Awards and nominations ==
Year	Award	Category	Work	Result
2011	Golden Screen TV Awards	Outstanding Adapted Drama Series	Green Rose	Nominated
2011	Golden Screen TV Awards	Outstanding Performance Of An Actor in a Drama Series	Jericho Rosales	Nominated
2011	25th Star Awards for TV	Best Drama Actor	Jericho Rosales	Nominated
2011	25th Star Awards for TV	Best Drama Actress	Anne Curtis	Nominated

== See also ==
- List of programs broadcast by ABS-CBN
- List of ABS-CBN Studios original drama series
