= Ang Cute ng Ina Mo! =

2007 Filipino comedy drama film

- Poster
- Directed by: Wenn V. Deramas
- Screenplay by: Mel Mendoza-Del Rosario; Wenn V. Deramas; Arlene Tamayo
- Story by: Mel Mendoza-Del Rosario
- Produced by: Charo Santos-Concio; Malou N. Santos; Vic del Rosario Jr.; Veronique Del Rosario Corpus; Vincent Del Rosario III
- Starring: Ai-Ai delas Alas; Anne Curtis; Luis Manzano; Eugene Domingo; John Lapus
- Cinematography: Sherman Philip T. So
- Edited by: Marya Ignacio
- Music by: Vincent de Jesus
- Production company: Viva Films
- Distributed by: ABS-CBN Film Productions (Note: Co-produced and co-distributed under the joint label, Star Cinema/ABS-CBN Film Productions Inc.)
- Release date: April 7, 2007
- Running time: 102 minutes
- Country: Philippines
- Languages: Filipino; Australian English
- Budget: ₱74.8 million
- Box office: ₱110 million

Ang Cute ng Ina Mo! (transl. Your Mom Is So Cute!) is a 2007 Filipino comedy drama film directed by Wenn V. Deramas. It stars Ai-Ai delas Alas, Anne Curtis, Eugene Domingo, Luis Manzano and John Lapus. The film premiered on April 7, 2007. This is the second film co-produced by Viva Films and Star Cinema years after Viva split from ABS-CBN in 2001. This was Manzano and Curtis' second film after 2006's All About Love with its second segment "Kalesa" and also the second Curtis film after Wag Kang Lilingon. Ang Cute ng Ina Mo! is a spinoff of the 2003 film Ang Tanging Ina, albeit Viva Films co-produced this one.

== Plot ==
In 1986, Georgia Quizon, her Australian fiancé Jack Outback and their daughter Christine are about to board a plane to Australia when she needs to use the restroom. Due to the long wait time, Jack and Christine are forced to leave for Australia without her. She waits until 1989 to get a visa to reunite with her family, but is not allowed to board her plane as her passport was destroyed in a coup attempt. Because of what happened, Jack breaks up with Georgia. Georgia then works at a fish sauce factory owned by Don Emong Goloid, and they marry. On the night of their honeymoon, Georgia accidentally hits Don Emong with a door, causing him to fall down the stairs and accidentally strangle himself to death. Don Emong's wealth is inherited by Georgia, which she uses to go to Australia in an unsuccessful attempt to find her daughter. She ends up adopting a young boy named Val, whom she treats as her child.

20 years later, Christine has grown up in Melbourne as a beautiful young lady. When she finds out that her father is still in love with Georgia, she decides to go to the Philippines with her nanny to meet Georgia and prevent Jack from marrying her. Georgia, along with Val and her friend Junjun, decide to throw a welcome party for Christine. Before they can go to the airport, Georgia is held hostage but saved after seeing Christine. Nanny, however, has a crush on Junjun, despite the latter's homosexuality. Christine gathers evidence that will make Jack hate Georgia more. First, she suspects Val and Georgia to be lovers. As time passes, Christine learns to know her mother better and falls in love with Val, but Georgia's neighbor and suitor Delfin, whose love Georgia rejected, tells Christine about what happened to Don Emong. This leads Jack to come to the Philippines.

Val later takes Christine's video camera and sees Christine's plot. When Christine learns that Emong's death was accidental, she and Nanny hurriedly rush to the airport. Jack, however, has already arrived and shows Georgia Christine's video showing all of the evidence against her. A betrayed Georgia disowns her daughter. Christine then confesses to Jack that she is the one responsible for everything. There, they ask for forgiveness from Georgia, but she rejects it. When Jack, Christine and Nanny are about to return to Australia, Georgia has a change of heart. Val and Junjun rush to the airport, but she once again suffers an accident, and is told that Christine has not yet boarded the plane. Despite being injured, Georgia marries Jack.

== Cast ==
=== Main ===
- Ai-Ai delas Alas as Georgia Quizon vda de Goloid - Outback
- Anne Curtis as Christine Outback
- Eugene Domingo as Nanny Ninonu
- John Lapus as Junjun
- Luis Manzano as Val Quizon

=== Supporting ===
- DJ Durano as Delfin
- Rycharde Everley as Jack Outback
- Benjamin Alves (credited as Vince Saldana) as Jojo
- Nikki Bacolod as Lisa
- Lou Veloso as Don Emong Goloid
- Makisig Morales as Super Inggo
- Jojit Lorenzo as Hostage Taker
- Shamaine Buencamino as Imelda Marcos
- Pen Medina as Ferdinand Marcos
- Moises Miclat as Gringo Honasan
- Vince Maristela as Young Val Quizon

== Reception ==
Ang Cute ng Ina Mo! was one of the films that earned more than 100 million pesos at the box office in 2007. The film obtained a domestic gross of $1,730,110 according to Box Office Mojo.

== Awards and recognitions ==
- 24th PMPC Star Awards for Movies
  Movie Actress of the Year - Ai-Ai delas Alas
