= Dyosa =

2008–09 Philippine television drama series

- Title card
- Genre: Adventure, Drama, Fantasy, Romance
- Created by: Myrna Garnace Tagasa; Clark Tolon; Kay Conlu-Brondial
- Developed by: ABS-CBN Studios
- Directed by: Wenn V. Deramas
- Starring: Anne Curtis; Sam Milby; Zanjoe Marudo; Luis Manzano
- Opening theme: "Himig ng Pag-ibig" by Yeng Constantino
- Composer: Lolita Carbon
- Country of origin: Philippines
- Original language: Filipino
- No. of episodes: 115

Production
- Executive producers: Carlo Katigbak; Cory Vidanes; Laurenti Dyogi; Roldeo T. Endrinal; Emerald C. Suarez
- Production location: Philippines
- Running time: 30-45 minutes
- Production company: Dreamscape Entertainment

Original release
- Network: ABS-CBN
- Release: August 11, 2008 – January 16, 2009

Related
- Tayong Dalawa

Dyosa (transl. Goddess) is a Philippine television drama fantasy series broadcast by ABS-CBN. Directed by Wenn V. Deramas, it stars Anne Curtis, Sam Milby, Zanjoe Marudo and Luis Manzano. It aired on the network's Primetime Bida line up and worldwide on TFC from August 11, 2008 to January 16, 2009 and was replaced by Tayong Dalawa.

The series is streaming online on YouTube.

== Synopsis ==
Dyosa tells the story of Josephine who grew up unaware of her true identity as the "Takda" (Chosen One) and how she learns of her lineage and destiny in the world of gods and goddesses. The Takda who hails from the Kabanua is chosen to save humankind from the imbalance brought about by the evil forces of Kasamyans. Josephine lives in the world of mortals where she meets a comic illustrator, Mars (Zanjoe Marudo) from Makiling Publishing who draws the fate of the Dyosa with the powers from the sky, earth, and water - Cielo, Tierra, Agua. Unknown to Mars, Josephine is the same as Dyosa whom he has fallen for in the form of Dyosa Cielo. Cielo is torn between her love for the mortal life - the mortal, Mars - and her duty as Takda.

Josephine is a young orphan who finally finds out she is no ordinary mortal after reaching the age of 18. After years of being raised by her foster parents, Josephine finds out she is the 'Takda' or Chosen One with divine powers and must help save the world from the Kasamyan, who are evil creatures from Lower Earth. After becoming a full-fledged goddess, Josephine also discovers that she has the power of the earth, air and water. To harness these powers, she takes the form of Dyosa Tierra, a centauride, Dyosa Agua, a mermaid, and Dyosa Cielo, a harpy. However, Josephine has to choose whether to heed the call of her destiny, to save the dying world of the gods and goddesses and to leave the life she has lived for 18 years or to resist her new role as a goddess and to give up her powers to stay in the human world with the mortal she loves.

== Plot ==
Long ago while the world was being created, the world of the immortals was also being formed by the almighty Bathala. Enchanted creatures had the responsibility of looking after nature and its inhabitants (humans). The world of the Engkantos was soon divided into two distinct groups –the benevolent Kabanuas and the evil Kasamayans. The two factions engaged in years of bitter war. Apo Suga, the leader of the Kabanua, asked the Sun God to bring peace to the world of the Engkantos. The Sun God granted Suga's wish and told him that one of his daughters would bear a child, a "Dyosa"’ or goddess that would have the strength to bring peace and unite the Kabanuas and Kasamayans.

Amang Suga then had the task of deciding which of his two daughters – Mariang Sinukuan or Mariang Magayon -would conceive the chosen one in her womb. The Sun God told him that the one with a pure heart would bear the Dyosa of Nature. Amang Suga put his two daughters to the test to determine which of them would give birth to Dyosa. He was satisfied with Sinukuan's reply and crowned her princess and heir to the Kabanua throne. Amang Suga then arranged for Mariang Sinukuan to be married to Tadaklan, the leader of the Kasamayans, with the hope of achieving peace in their world. Amang Suga, however, had no knowledge that Sinukuan was in love with Bernardo Carpio, a Kabanua warrior.

On the day of her wedding, Sinukuan was still undecided whether to follow her duty as the chosen one or follow her heart. Bernardo Carpio came to convince her to elope with him. Mariang Sinukuan made up her mind, followed her heart and went on to escape with Bernardo Carpio, accompanied by Huling and Miong. As they crossed treacherous roads and in the middle of their journey, Sinukuan revealed that she was carrying Bernardo's child. Apo Suga, Tadaklan and Magayon caught up with Sinukuan and Bernardo Carpio at the passageway to the world of mortals. Tadaklan, enraged by Sinukuan's treachery, turned Bernardo Carpio into a statue of stone, while Sinukuan's two companions were transformed into dwarves and Bakos was turned into an ugly goat creature. Mariang Sinukuan was not able to escape the fury of her sister Magayon who turned her into a unicorn. Mariang Magayon revealed that she was also in love with Bernardo and also pregnant with his child. The Kasamyans almost immediately returned to their previous ugly appearance after the wedding was called-off.

After the disappearance of her sister and due to Apo Suga's failing health, Mariang Magayon took over the Kabanua throne. The Lakans reluctantly accepted her leadership but still considered Sinukuan the rightful heir to the throne. Magayon made a pact with Tadaklan to arrange a marriage between Magayon's daughter and his son.

Meanwhile, Sinukuan, along with Huling and Miong, was transported into the world of humans, with the help of Bakos' magical flute. The trio landed in a circus where Huling and Miong were forced to work as dancing midgets. The greedy owner of the circus noticed that the unicorn (Sinukuan) could fetch her more money, so she decided to make it into a dancing unicorn and forced it to perform a dance in front of the crowd. The unicorn later gave birth to a beautiful, human baby girl. The child quickly manifests the traits of being a Dyosa, transforming from a human into a mermaid, centaur, or harpy.

=== Chapter One: The Destined Child ===
King Suga had a conversation with Bathala ng Araw (the God of the Sun), asking him what he has to do to stop the feuds between the Kabanuas and the Kasamyans. Bathala ng Araw tells him that to fulfill the peace between the worlds, King Suga must choose between his two daughters of which one would carry the Destined Child and so King Suga chose Mariang Sinukuan.

Amang Suga, the ruler of the Kabanua, orders his daughter Mariang Sinukuan to marry Tadaklan of the Kasamyan to achieve a balance between the forces of good and evil. But on her wedding day, Sinukuan discovers that she is pregnant, and she elopes with her true love and the father of her child, Bernardo Carpio . Tragically, Sinukuan and Bernardo must pay the high price of their defiance.

Magayon, the sister of Sinukuan, takes over the leadership from the ailing Amang Suga. She makes a pact with the enraged Tadaklan to rule the kingdom and to kill Sinukuan and her child. Meanwhile, cursed as a unicorn, Sinukuan finds refuge in the world of the mortals where she gives birth to a baby girl. She hands over the care of her daughter to her two servants, Huling and Miong. But coming from the bloodline of deities, the child exhibits the power of a true ‘Takda’, the one destined to bring forth peace and harmony.

Sinukuan (Mickey Ferriols) returns to Kabanwa to try to make peace with her family, but her envious sister Magayon (Jaclyn Jose) is still determined to destroy her.

=== Chapter Two: The Secrets Unwraps ===
It didn't take long before Josephine could realize what Bakos has previously told her. While traveling across the sea their boat was robbed by bandits. During the commotion Josephine's brother fell off the boat. Josephine quickly jumped into the water to save her little brother. As she swims underneath the water, Josephine suddenly transforms into a mermaid (Dyosa Agua), was able to bring her brother to the surface and hang him at the side of the boat. After saving her brother, Josephine puts her attention to the bandits, she summon a couple of whirlpools and used it to toss the bandits into the water. Josephine doesn't want to scare the people on the boat, so she decided to swim to a nearby shore. After landing off the coast, Josephine made another transformation, this time into a centaurides - a half-woman, half-horse creature (Dyosa Tierra). As she runs into the island's interior, the trees gave their respect by bowing to Josephine. Two armed men spotted her and try to shoot her, Josephine attempts to escape but reaches a cliff. As the armed men tried to shoot her, Josephine slipped and fell off the cliff, this time she transforms into a half-man, half-eagle – Dyosa Cielo and flies her way out of danger.

After years of absence, Bakos finally returns to Kabanua, the Kabanuans hardly recognized him and thought that he's a maligno. Bakos was shocked to find out that Magayon's daughter will be crowned today as a new Takda. Amang Suga was about to put the Tiara on Diana's head, when Bakos came forth and tries to stop the coronation. Bakos revealed to Amang Suga that Sinukuan's daughter - the real Takda is still alive. Magayon was stunned to learn that Sinukuan's daughter survived.

Josephine manages to escape from the huntsmen and while flying across the sky the Haring Araw made an apparition. Josephine was told that her sudden transformation into three different beings is just a premonition of being the Takda. The powers to control land, air and sea were bestowed upon her to fulfill the prophecy but the Haring Araw warned her that the path will be rough and a lot of perils will come along the way. After talking to the Haring Araw, Josephine found herself lying on the beach – naked. She thought that she was just dreaming but Kulas was there to validate that she really is a Dyosa and introduces himself as a Gibut. But despite experiencing the signs of being a Goddess, Josephine refuses to accept her fate and was in a state of denial. Kulas tries to convince Josephine to come to Kabanua with him but the young lady thought that Kulas is just putting a gag on her.

=== Chapter Three: Diana's Quest ===
At Kabanua, Diana was very upset after her coronation as a Takda was called-off after Amang Suga was informed that Sinukuan's daughter was still alive. Diana went to Kasamian to inform her lover Adonis that Sinukuan's daughter is still alive, Adonis was very angry because it might endanger the Kasamian's aspiration of obtaining back their old facial appearances. Meanwhile, Bakos was ordered by amang Suga and the Lakans to fetch Josephine from the world of mortals and bring her to Kasamian. Bakos quickly went to Josephine's house, finally showed himself to Huling and Miong and despite Huling's apprehension, Bakos went ahead to see Josephine in her room. Bakos showed the Tiara and tries to convince her to come in Kabanua and be crowned as the Takda.

Since learning that Sinukuan's daughter was still alive, Diana grew restless and relentlessly practiced her powers in preparation for a face-off with her half sister Josephine. Without informing her mother, Diana decides to go to the mortal world. She used her powers to drill a hole from the immortal world into the world of mortals.

=== Chapter Four: Humble Heroine ===
After Kulas and Bakos both failed to convince Josephine, one of the Lakans from Kabanua took his opportunity to persuade Josephine to accept her fate as a Goddess, but to no avail. Josephine's earlier experience though, it did not necessarily persuade her to accept the Dyosa tag, opens Josephine's eyes that her power can be used to help others in need.

Josephine's encounter with the Kasamians was soon followed by a more dangerous one, while walking on her way home, she was abducted by two manananggals. After threatening that she will become their next meal, Josephine abruptly transformed into Dyosa Cielo and fought the malignos - hurling them to the ground. The two manananggals then turned their attention to Miong and Venus, snatching both of them into the air. The malignos threaten Josephine to drop the two and teased her which of the two shall she will save first. Venus was dropped first and was saved by Josephine but Miong was not so lucky as he plummeted to the ground. Miong was rushed into the hospital and was in severe pain. At the hospital, Huling and Josephine were intrigued by a delirious man (Zanjoe Marudo) who repeatedly moans the word "Dyosa".

Bakos tries to make Josephine recite several Kabanua chants or codes that she can use to transform into three different types of Dyosa. The goat was very joyful to see that there is some improvement over Josephine's stance as being a Dyosa. She told Bakos that she had already accepted her powers and intends to use it for the good of others, although she still refuses to come to Kasamian and leave her family behind.

=== Chapter Five: Help or Trouble ===
Sinukuan was overjoyed to finally see her long-lost daughter but she didn't reveal her identity because it might compromise the safety of the Takda. Amang Suga had a strict instruction to Sinukuan, not to reveal her real identity until the Takda has been crowned the Queen of Kabanua. It was night again and it is time for Adonis to snatch another victim, Diana who was just nearby and is currently interrogating a Takda suspect, then sensed the presence of Adonis. Diana quickly abandons her victim and teleported to Adonis's location. After avoiding her since going to the mortal world, Adonis had a change of heart assuring Diana that they will work together in finding the Takda.

The launch of Dyosa comics is set to commence but its model Clarrise (Diana) is nowhere to be found because she has spent an intimate night with Adonis. Huling and Miong were stunned to see Sinukuan after 18 years but they were unable to talk much because of the event, but promised to keep in touch with each other. The show went well until a technical glitch threatens to ruin the show. One of the harnesses that supports the model of Dyosa Cielo gave in. Josephine rushed to the dressing room and transforms into Dyosa Cielo. The goddess of air came just in the nick of time to save the model from falling off the ceiling. Mars was staggered by what he saw because it was the exact creature that he's been drawing throughout the years. Mars tries to unravel the identity of Dyosa Cielo by running after the model, but Josephine stalled his attempts. At the end of the launch, Mars handed Huling and Miong copies of Dyosa comics which serve as a forewarning of things to come.

Meanwhile, Bruhita the witch noticed a copy of Dyosa comics and observed that it seem to have some similarities with what's happening in the real world and the depiction of the Kasamians and the Kabanuas. Adonis quickly ordered his sentinels to get the illustrator of Dyosa comics. Mars was working overtime and was alone at the office when the Kasamians came and forcibly abducted him.

=== Chapter Six: Goddess in Love ===
It didn't surprise Adonis that the girl that he bumped into was the Takda, he ordered the witch to pinpoint the location of the Takda. The situation became very tense afterwards because Diana was able to locate his mansion and Adonis was in his handsome looks. The witch was able to make Adonis uglier just in time after Diana had entered the mansion. After much time and effort, the witch cited the whereabouts of Josephine and Kulas. Adonis finally solved the mystery behind his encounter with the Kabanua (Kulas) and learned that he's the caretaker of the Takda.

Kulas is falling more and more in love with Josephine. In spite of Bakos's repeated advice to stop his feelings, Kulas is adamant to reveal his love for Josephine. A perfect timing and opportunity came in Kulas's way after Josephine agreed to come with him, at the beach this coming weekend. Meanwhile, Sinukuan had a frightening nightmare of a forthcoming danger, so she decided to consult Mars via telepathy to know what's going to happen next. Mars became possessed and started to draw vigorously. Their communication was cut short after Adonis came by at the office to visit Mars.

Josephine became concerned about the effects of nightmares to Mars's mind, so she decided to surprise him by showing herself as Dyosa Cielo. Mars was overwhelmed to see the creature he had always dreamt of meeting. Dyosa Cielo assured Mars that he's not losing his mind and all of his nightmares are true. Dyosa Cielo advised Mars to use his gift in helping those who are in need. Before leaving, Mars requested for a kiss but Dyosa Cielo says that despite her appearance she is still conservative.

=== Chapter Seven: Powerless ===
At Kabanua, Amang Suga noticed something fishy about her daughter, so he instructed Hiyas to spy on Magayon. Magayon was caught red-handed while delivering a Lambana on Kasamian to become a slave. She was immediately arrested and was put to trial at the council for treason, After Saliminsim gave a testimony of Magayon's crime the council convicted Magayon of treachery, decided to remove her powers and she was banished below.

Later on, Diana was surprised to see her mother in the mortal world. Magayon didn't reveal the truth that she's convicted in Kabanua, instead she pretended to miss her daughter and wanted to help in finding the Takda.

=== Chapter Eight: Outrageous Revelations ===
Diana was bewildered by Magayon's revelation that Josephine is the Takda. Although Diana had developed some kind of special bond with Josephine, she is determined to finish off the Takda whoever she may be. At Josephine's house, Bakos and Kulas were carefully assessing of what their next move will be. Josephine is determined to assail the house of Clarisse and rescue her Nanay Huling and Tatay Miong but Kulas and Bakos totally opposed her idea, for as long as she doesn't put on the tiara, she will have no chance of beating Magayon and Diana.

At Diana's house, Diana finally discovered that her mother had no powers. This prompted Diana to seek the help of Adonis in slaying the Takda. Knowing that the Kasamians were masters of treachery, Magayon refused to work with them. Diana didn't listen to her mother's advice and went on to see Adonis. The prince of Kasamian was surprised that Diana had already found the Takda. Adonis decided to visit Josephine's house but it is unclear whether Adonis will come to protect Josephine, or to carry out the plan ahead of Diana's.

=== Chapter Nine: Without the Guardians ===
Magayon and Diana made their escape, jumping on the portal that Salaminsim had created. Mars quickly went to check on Cielo, which infuriates Kulas even more—after Josephine chose to save Mars instead of her parents. The two got into another heated confrontation. Kulas blames her for the loss of Huling and Miong, lashing some harsh words towards Josephine. At the mansion, Bruhita kept on reminding Adonis to carry out the plan of slaying the Takda, especially now that they have what it takes to wear down its protection. Tadaklan on the other hand is very anxious about the progress of their mission, so he checks Bruhita for some developments, every now and then.

After the disappearance of her parents plus the pressure of accepting the Tiara, Josephine seemed to have made up her mind not to accept it, saying that she's not qualified to become the Takda. Kulas and Bakos, later tried to apologize and convince Josephine once again to accept the crown but they were unsuccessful. Meanwhile, Mars is very worried about Dyosa Cielo but his worries soon disappear when Cielo shows up at his doorsteps. Unfortunately for Mars, Cielo was there to say farewell. Cielo explains that she doesn't want to put him in danger and it is better if they part ways to avoid it.

After Magayon killed Sinyang, Connie thought it would be better to get the Tiara back from Magayon so she told Bakus to go and get it for her. Bakus brought Venus with him for help. when Bakus caught the Tiara Diana killed the Kabanua, turning him into ashes and retrieved the crown.

=== Chapter Ten: From Foes to Friends ===
Tadaklan has sent Ek-eks in the mortal world to capture the Takda, after doing so after flying on the Takda for hours they decided to drop her, she reached consciousness and transformed into Dyosa Cielo, the Ek-eks managed to grab her and burn her wings. She landed in the forest and transformed into Dyosa Tierra. She was surrounded by the Kasamyans and was unable to fight but Adonis came and Tierra made her escape.

Adonis was badly injured so Dyosa brought him into an abandoned mansion. She took care of him for a while not knowing that he is the prince of Kasamian. Her two remaining Guardians, Kulas and Mars tried to tell her to stop helping the injured Kasamian but she does not listen. Bruhita managed to contact her master in his dream but almost kills Adonis, so Dyosa goes and gets a cure for it. It didn't work but after hugging the Kasamian, he finally gets better.

When Tadaklan found out about the Takda and Adonis he went to the mortal world and looked for Adonis. Dyosa Cielo came and dropped Tadaklan into the ocean, he transformed into some sort of voodoo doll to protect him from the waters. He was later saved by Mang Pekto.

=== Chapter Eleven: Thieves ===
Magayon and Diana was given three magical items from a mysterious forecaster to slowly steal The Takda's powers and abilities. Magayon poses as an ugly leper so that she can give one of the magical items to the Takda, she successfully does so, while she wears the item, slowly her powers will start to weaken and be transferred into Diana all in all she managed to steal both Dyosa Cielo and Dyosa Tierra. While Josephine was weak she found out that Adonis and Halimaw were one and the same, she blamed him for the cause of her weakening. When Josephine found out about Magayon and Diana's plans, she formulated a plan to steal the amulet and destroy it, she successfully does so, all her powers return to Dyosa.

While Diana was stealing powers from the Takda, Huling was caught by the beam and was turned into stone. Barakula went to Pearly Shells for the potion, but the Shokoy would only give it to him if Barakula would marry Dugong's frog niece called Gorga, for the potion he agrees to marry the frog creature.

Meanwhile, Tadaklan escapes from the gay Mang Pekto and talks to Bruhita about how to get a new body. The Witch says that he has to steal the body of a powerful Kabanuan when there is a blue moon, and he chooses Josephine's brother, Venus. While trapped in Kasamian, Venus finally managed to revive the faun, Bakus. With the help of Adonis and Bernardo Carpio, Venus and Bakus managed to escape the Kasamyan.

=== Chapter Twelve: Unveiling the Truth ===
After reviving Huling from her being a statue, she and Miong decided to finally tell Josephine about her real parents: Mariang Sinukuan & Bernardo Carpio. Mariang Sinukuan has been set up by Magayon to take the pictures of Sinukuan & Dexter, the guy who works for Magayon & Salaminsim because she loves Bernardo Carpio. But he doesn't want her because he loves his future wife. Magayon is using her own sister to switch bodies as said by the book of prophecy to use it for her plans, but will they switch back to normal? Magayon is Sinukuan who is trying to tell her daughter the truth that she and Magayon have switched bodies. Only Mars knows the truth to warn Josephine that Tadaklan is inside Venus, and switching bodies of Magayon and Sinukuan with his precognition ability. Will Josephine & other Kabanuwas find out the truth, find a way to put everything back, and save everyone? Mars has a healing ability which could heal Josephine back to life including Magayon is Sinukuan. Sinukuan is Magayon is Sinukuan has been telling Kabanwas the truth that she is Sinukuan by switching bodies with Magayon, that Kabanwas didn't believe her until Amang Suga finds out that Magayon is inside Sinukuan, & Sinukuan is inside Magayon's body that they switch bodies by the book of prophecy that Salaminsim & Kulas have been telling the truth according to Mars' precognition ability that he drew... Salaminsim in a magic mirror is telling the Kabanwas the truth to show proof that Magayon & Sinukuan switched bodies. Sinukuan & Magayon return to their normal bodies. And at the end Magayon is captured by Mars, Kulas & Josephine and Amang Suga punishes her for good along with Diana.

== Cast and characters ==
=== Main cast ===
- Anne Curtis as Josephine Sinukuan, The Chosen One, only daughter of Mariang Sinukuan and Bernardo Carpio and Apo Suga's granddaughter
  - Dyosa Tierra (a Centaur)
  - Dyosa Agua (a Mermaid)
  - Dyosa Cielo (a Harpy)
- Sam Milby as Prinsipe Adonis, the former Prince of the Kasamayans
- Luis Manzano as Kulas
- Zanjoe Marudo as Mars

=== Supporting cast ===
- Nikki Bacolod as Diana, only daughter of Mariang Magayon and Josephine's cousin
- Mickey Ferriols as Mariang Sinukuan (Sinyang/Connie/Aning), youngest daughter of Amang Suga and Josephine's mother
- Jacklyn Jose as Mariang Magayon, eldest daughter of Amang Suga
- Lloyd Samartino as Apo/Amang Suga, the leader of the Kabanua, and Mariang Sinukuan and Magayon's father and Josephine's grandfather
- Matthew Mendoza as Bernardo Carpio, a Kabanua warrior and Josephine's father
- Jeffrey "Epy" Quizon as Bakus
- Carlos Morales as Tadaklan, the leader of the Kasamayans and Prinsipe Adonis's adoptive father
- Maricar de Mesa as Calliope Makiling
- Rubi Rubi as Huling
- Jojit Lorenzo as Miyong
- Tess Antonio as Bruhita
- Vice Ganda as Salaminsim
- Micah Muñoz as Loki
- Joseph Andre Garcia as Venus (Binoy)
- Crispin Pineda as Mang Emo
- Mark Dhen Ybañez as Hunatrico
- Jeramie dela Cerna as Mitra
- Katrina Endino as Mamay Umeng
- Rovilla Canillo as Demetria

=== Guest cast ===
- Paul Salas as young Kulas
- Sophia Baars as young Josephine Sinukuan
- Basty Alcances as young Loki
- Andrew Wolff as Ares
- Dianne Medina as Agatha
- Jessy Mendiola as Cheepa
- Jeffrey Santos as Memphis
- Ria Garcia as Mayang
- Jon "Chokoleit" Garcia as Pearly Shells (from the character of fantaserye Marina)
- Ogie Diaz as Mang Pekto/S.H.O.C.O.T. Agent
- DJ Durano as Dexter (a man who's falling inlove Connie)
- Precious Lara Quigaman as Gorga (Lady Frog Grand Daughter of Dugong)
- JC Parker as Lualhati Amor (Mother of Prinsipe Adonis)

== Accolades ==
=== Awards and nominations ===
5th USTv Awards Student Choice Best Actress in Daily Soap Opera Anne Curtis with John Lloyd Cruz Best Actor in Daily Soap Opera I Love Betty La Fea - won

== See also ==
- List of programs broadcast by ABS-CBN
- List of ABS-CBN Studios original drama series
