= Anne Curtis =

Filipino actress (born 1985)

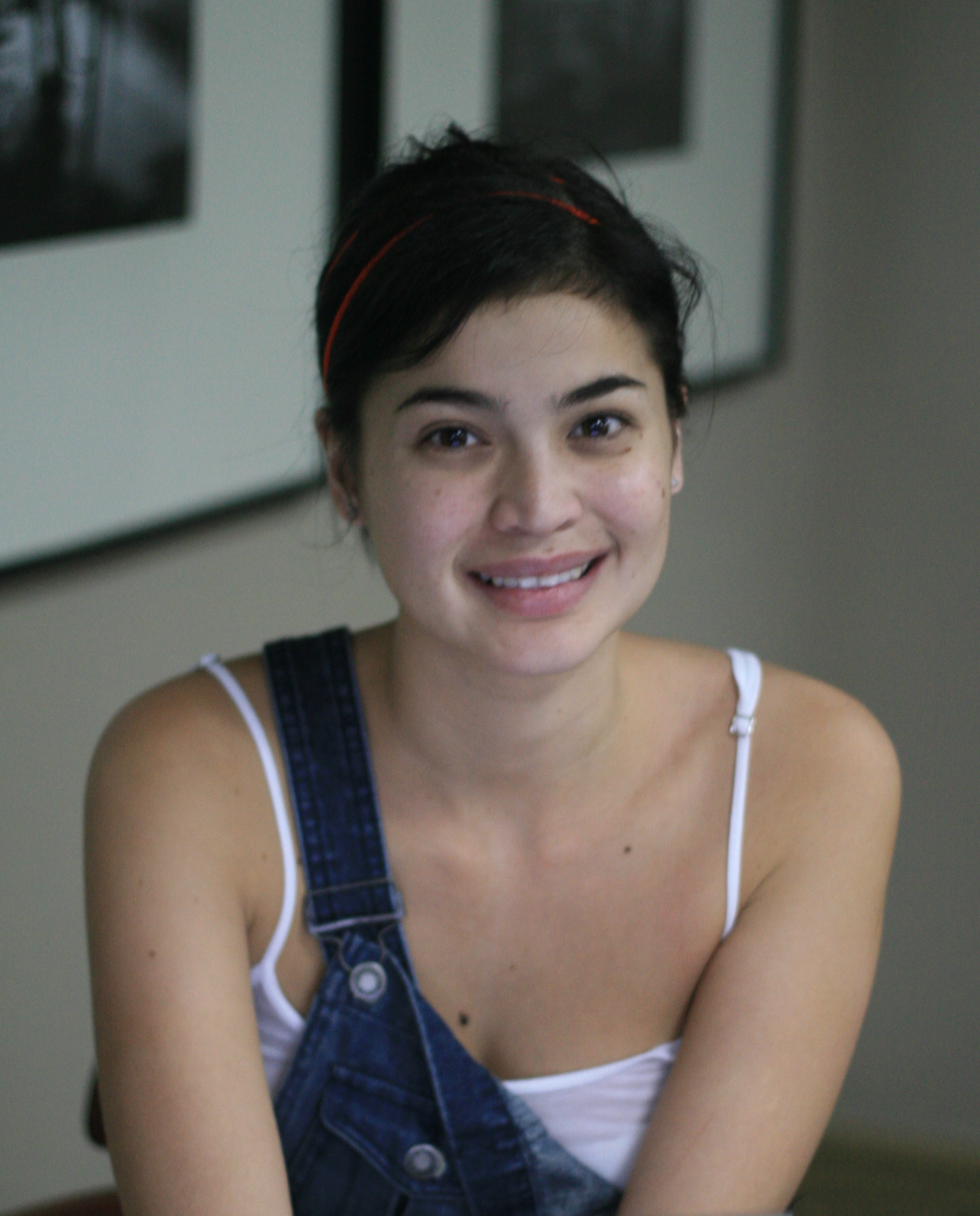
- Curtis in 2009
- Born: Anne Curtis-Smith (Note: Anne Curtis was born in Australia. Thus, she does not possess her mother's maiden name which is Ojales.); 17 February 1985 (age 41); Yarrawonga, Victoria, Australia
- Citizenship: Australia; Philippines
- Occupations: Actress; model; television host; singer; businesswoman
- Years active: 1997–present
- Agent: Viva Artists Agency (1997–present)
- Spouse: Erwan Heussaff (m. 2017)
- Children: 1
- Relatives: Jasmine Curtis-Smith (sister); Solenn Heussaff (sister-in-law)

Anne Curtis-Smith (Tagalog pronunciation: [ˈkəɹ.tɪs]; born 17 February 1985) is a Filipino actress, television host, singer, and businesswoman. Known for her versatile work in film and television productions, she is one of the most successful and highest-paid Filipino actresses of her generation. She is a recipient of numerous accolades, including two FAMAS Awards, two Metro Manila Film Festival Awards, a Luna Award, and four Box Office Entertainment Awards. She has been named multiple times by Tatler magazine as one of the most influential Filipinos in Asia.

At age 12, Curtis made her film debut in the fantasy drama Magic Kingdom: Ang Alamat ng Damortis (1997). Her breakthrough came with her portrayal as a disfigured woman in the series Kampanerang Kuba (2005). She soon took more starring roles in films, generally in mainstream productions such as All About Love (2006), Ang Cute ng Ina Mo! (2007), and When Love Begins (2008). Curtis won the Metro Manila Film Festival Award for Best Actress for her performance in Baler (2008). She gained further notice for her role as a goddess with divine powers in Dyosa (2008). Curtis has co-hosted the long-running noontime variety show It's Showtime since 2009.

For her role in the romantic drama In Your Eyes (2010), she won the Luna Award for Best Supporting Actress. She also won the FAMAS Award for Best Actress for her portrayal in the film No Other Woman (2011), which broke the record as the highest-grossing Filipino film at that time. In the ensuing years, she starred in a number of commercially successful films of various genres, such as A Secret Affair (2012), The Gifted (2014), Sid & Aya: Not a Love Story (2018), Aurora (2018), Just a Stranger (2019), and The Mall, The Merrier! (2019). Curtis was appointed by UNICEF as the Celebrity Advocate for Children in 2015 and has served as the national ambassador of the agency since 2019.

Curtis's films have collectively earned ₱1.87 billion, making her one of the highest-grossing Filipino box office stars of all time. She is the most followed Filipino celebrity on Twitter and the second most followed Filipino celebrity on Instagram. In 2018, she was named as one of the most promising Asian acts by the Variety magazine and the International Film Festival and Awards. In 2020, Forbes Asia included her on their list of 100 Digital Stars in Asia Pacific region. Curtis became the fourth Filipino to be honored with a Madame Tussauds wax figure in 2024 in Hong Kong.

== Early life ==
Anne Ojales Curtis-Smith was born in Yarrawonga, Victoria, Australia, the daughter of Carmencita Ojales, a Filipina of Chinese and Spanish ancestry from Bolinao, Pangasinan, and James Ernest Curtis-Smith (1943–2026), an Australian lawyer of German, Italian, Irish, and English ancestry. Her father married Ojales in 1982. Her younger sister, Jasmine, is also an actress. On their father's side, they had a half-sister named Clare who died in 2007 due to a cardiovascular disease at four months old.

In 1997, at the age of 11, Curtis visited her mother's relatives in the Philippines with her family. During this trip, a talent scout approached her, inviting her to enter a children's beauty pageant. Despite initial scepticism from her father, Curtis, with her mother's support, decided to explore opportunities in the entertainment industry. Without her father's knowledge, she began attending various talent agencies. Eventually, the family made the decision to stay permanently in the Philippines. At the time, Curtis faced the challenge of not being able to speak or understand Tagalog, prompting her to enroll in language classes.

== Career ==
=== 1997–2004: Career beginnings ===
In 1997, Curtis had her film debut in Magic Kingdom: Ang Alamat ng Damortis. Afterwards, she signed with Viva Films and GMA Network. Her first television appearance was in the drama series, Ikaw na Sana. She was also part of the teen-oriented show, T.G.I.S..

From 1998 to 2003, Curtis had a string of minor and supporting roles in films such as Honey, My Love... So Sweet, Ika-13 Kapitulo, Juan & Ted: Wanted and in television shows May Bukas Pa, Beh Bote Nga, Anna Karenina, and Idol Ko si Kap.

In 2004, Curtis moved from GMA Network to ABS-CBN, stating the move "majorly life changing." Her first project with the network was the drama Hiram starring Dina Bonnevie and Kris Aquino. She also joined ASAP as a host and as a performer.

=== 2005–2011: Rise to prominence ===
In 2005, Curtis starred in her breakthrough television series as titular Kampanerang Kuba. A fantasy drama, the series marked her first collaboration with director Wenn V. Deramas. Curtis then hosted the reality show Qpids with Luis Manzano, and a segment in the talk show The Buzz called Wanna Buzz.

In 2006, Curtis joined Manzano as one of the hosts of the second kids season of the reality talent competition Star Circle Quest. That same year, she starred in the romantic drama All About Love, where she co-starred with John Lloyd Cruz, Bea Alonzo, Luis Manzano, Angelica Panganiban and Jason Abalos; as well as the supernatural horror film Wag Kang Lilingon with Kristine Hermosa. She portrayed Celine Magsaysay in the drama series Maging Sino Ka Man. She received acclaim for her performance in the series, and received her first acting nomination at the PMPC Star Awards for TV for Best Drama Actress.

In 2007, Curtis reunited with Wenn V. Deramas for the comedy film Ang Cute Ng Ina Mo. She also co-starred with Oyo Boy Sotto in Sineserye Presents: May Minamahal, and reprised her role of in the second installment of Maging Sino Ka Man, entitled Maging Sino Ka Man: Ang Pagbabalik. Earlier in the year, Curtis also became a video jockey for MTV Philippines.

In 2008, Curtis starred in two romantic dramas; When Love Begins, alongside Aga Muhlach, and the 34th Metro Manila Film Festival official entry, Baler, with Jericho Rosales. For her performance in the latter, she won the Metro Manila Film Festival Award for Best Actress. This marked Curtis' first acting award. She also received Best Actress nominations at the 57th FAMAS Awards, 25th PMPC Star Awards for Movies, 11th Gawad PASADO Awards, and a 27th Luna Awards. Also in 2008, Curtis top-billed the fantasy television series Dyosa, where she played four different characters. Because of the role, she was dubbed as the "Dyosa" of Philippine Show business.

In 2009, Curtis became one of the main hosts of the morning competition program, Showtime! alongside Vhong Navarro, Kim Atienza, and Vice Ganda, and starred in the romantic comedy television series, The Wedding, with Zanjoe Marudo and Derek Ramsay. For her work in Showtime!, she and her co-hosts received a nomination for Best Talent Search Program Host at the 24th PMPC Star Awards for TV.

In 2010, Curtis starred in the romantic comedy film Babe, I Love You. The movie marked her first big-screen team-up with Sam Milby. She also starred in the romantic drama film In Your Eyes, alongside Claudine Barretto and Richard Gutierrez. Her role in the film earned her an award for Best Supporting Actress at the 29th Luna Awards, and a Movie Actress of the Year nomination at the 27th PMPC Star Awards for Movies.

In 2011, Curtis starred in the Philippine adaptation of the Korean drama, Green Rose, with Jericho Rosales. She also top-billed the comedy film Who's That Girl?, which served as her reunion movie with Luis Manzano. In the same year, she starred in the romantic drama film No Other Woman with Derek Ramsay and Cristine Reyes. The film is a box-office success, grossing ₱100 million in five days, and has a total gross of ₱278 million. No Other Woman briefly became the highest-grossing Filipino film, before it was eclipsed by The Unkabogable Praybeyt Benjamin, later in the year. For the film's box-office performance, she and Reyes were recognized as the Box-Office Queens at the 43rd Box Office Entertainment Awards. Curtis also won the Best Actress awards at the 14th Gawad Pasado Awards, and 60th FAMAS Awards. Furthermore, she received her third Movie Actress of the Year nomination at the 28th PMPC Star Awards for Movies.

In the same year, Curtis also had her first foray into the Philippine music scene. Although a confessed non-singer, Curtis launched her debut studio album, Annebisyosa, under Viva Records, on 25 September 2011. She described the album as "super fun" and "not serious", and jokingly stated that people should listen at their own risk. The album was an instant hit, reaching PARI gold status in less than a month, and platinum status in December of that year.

=== 2012–2017: Continued film, television, and music success ===
In 2012, Curtis staged her first solo concert tour, Annebisyosa: No Other Concert World Tour at the Smart Araneta Coliseum, in support of her debut album. The concert was also in celebration of her 15th year in show business. She performed in several local provinces as well as internationally in cities such as Hong Kong and California. For the concert tour, she won the award for Female Concert Performer of the Year at the 44th Box Office Entertainment Awards. Also in 2012, Curtis' morning competition program, Showtime, was reformatted into a noontime variety show, It's Showtime, and replaced Happy Yipee Yehey! in its regular noontime slot. For her work in It's Showtime, she received an award for Best Female TV Host at the 27th PMPC Star Awards for Television. She then starred in the romantic drama A Secret Affair, which earned her a third FAMAS Award for Best Actress nomination.

In 2013, Curtis, along with Kris Aquino and Robin Padilla, led the drama series, Kailangan Ko'y Ikaw. While in the following year, she played the title role in ABS-CBN's adaptation of Mars Ravelo's Dyesebel. She also starred in two films that year; the comedy film The Gifted, with Sam Milby and Cristine Reyes, and the romance thriller, Blood Ransom. The former earned her a fourth nomination for Movie actress of the year at the 31st PMPC Star Awards for Movies. She also released her second studio album, The Forbidden, and had her second solo concert tour, The Forbidden Concert: Annekapal at the Smart Araneta Coliseum.

In 2015, Curtis focused on It's Showtime, and received her second win for Best Female TV Host at the 29th PMPC Star Awards for Television. Then in 2016, Curtis became the main host of the reality music competition, I Love OPM, and its spinoff, We Love OPM: The Celebrity Sing-Offs. She also launched her third studio album, Forever Young, during the year.

=== 2018–2019: Diverse film roles and further acclaim ===
In 2018, Curtis starred in the romantic drama film Sid & Aya: Not a Love Story with Dingdong Dantes, directed by Irene Villamor; and in the action thriller film BuyBust directed by Erik Matti. For her role in the latter, she became a practitioner of Pekiti-Tirsia Kali, a style of Filipino Martial Arts. Curtis received critical acclaim for both films, receiving a rare double nomination for Best Actress at the 42nd Gawad Urian Awards. Variety also selected Curtis as one of five Asian talents to be honored with the Asian Star: Up Next award at the Macau Film Festival. Furthermore, her performance in Sid & Aya: Not a Love Story earned her Best Actress nominations at the 37th Luna Awards and the 67th FAMAS Awards, where she was also honored with the FPJ Memorial Award. Later in the year, she appeared in the 44th Metro Manila Film Festival through the Yam Laranas’ horror thriller film Aurora. For her performance in the film, she received her second nomination for Best Actress at the festival's award ceremony.

In 2019, Curtis in the erotic romantic drama film Just a Stranger with Marco Gumabao, which became a box-office success. At the 36th PMPC Star Awards for Movies, the pair received a nomination for Movie Love Team of the Year, making it her eighth PMPC Star Awards for Movies nod. She also returned to the Metro Manila Film Festival with her It's Showtime co host Vice Ganda in their first film together, the musical comedy The Mall, The Merrier. Despite mixed reviews from critics, the film was a box-office success. It grossed ₱323 million, making it one of the highest-grossing Filipino films, and Curtis' highest-grossing film to date. During the year, Curtis also received her fourth win for Best Female TV Host at the 33rd PMPC Star Awards for Television for her work on It's Showtime.

=== 2020–present: Hiatus and return to television and film ===
In 2020, Curtis announced a hiatus from the entertainment industry to focus on her pregnancy and married life. She returned to It's Showtime in 2022.

In 2023, she appeared as a guest judge in the second season of Drag Race Philippines, then she played in Family Feud alongside her Showtime co-hosts the following year.

In 2025, she headlined the Philippine adaptation of It's Okay to Not Be Okay alongside Carlo Aquino and Joshua Garcia. She also had a cameo appearance in Love You So Bad.

In 2026, she reunited with her Baler and Green Rose co-star Jericho Rosales in their third collaboration and her second film with director Irene Villamor, The Loved One. The film is the highest-grossing Filipino film of 2026 with a global box-office gross of ₱300 million.

Curtis is set to reprise her role as the former anti-narcotics operative Nina Madigan in BuyBust: The Undesirables, the spin-off and sequel series to the 2018 film BuyBust.

== Other ventures ==
=== Charitable and philanthropic work ===
In March 2015, Curtis became a celebrity advocate for UNICEF Philippines, having supported the organisation since 2009. In this role, she visited communities in Leyte affected by Typhoon Yolanda, meeting children and families and observing recovery efforts intended to improve the welfare of vulnerable Filipino children and support communities affected by the disaster. In October 2015, Curtis launched a marathon called the "Heroes for Children Run" to benefit UNICEF's "1,000 Days of Life" campaign. In 2019, she became UNICEF's National Goodwill Amabassador.

=== Book ===
In February 2016, Curtis launched her first written work, a children's book entitled Anita, the Duckling Diva in collaboration with UNICEF Philippines.

=== Business ===
In September 2017, Curtis launched her makeup line in the Philippines, BLK cosmetics. In 2020, Curtis launched Recess, an activewear brand, with friend Isabelle Daza. In 2021, she also launched Tili Dahli, a baby wear brand she co-owns with sister-in-law Solenn Heussaff.

Curtis co-owned a chain of karaoke boxes called Rockstar KTV Bar with Karylle, Yael Yuzon and Ria Malig as business partners. Rockstar KTV Bar has several branches across Metro Manila.

== Personal life ==
In December 2016, Curtis became engaged to her longtime boyfriend, restaurateur and food blogger Erwan Heussaff; they were married on 12 November 2017 in Queenstown, New Zealand. Curtis gave birth to their child, Dahlia Amélie, on 2 March 2020, in Australia. The name "Dahlia" is said to be taken from the name of Curtis' character in her 1997 debut film, Magic Kingdom: Ang Alamat ng Damortis.

=== Political views ===
Curtis supported the Akbayan party-list in the 2025 Philippine House of Representatives elections.

She participated in the Trillion Peso March along EDSA on 21 September 2025. She held a placard saying, "Manindigan, Lumaban, Makialam" ("Stand Up, Fight, Intervene").

=== Legacy ===
In 2024, Curtis was featured as a wax figure in the Madame Tussauds Hong Kong' Glamour Zone on 9 December, in recognition of contributions to the entertainment industry.

== Filmography ==
=== Film ===
Year	Title	Role
1997	Magic Kingdom: Ang Alamat ng Damortis	Prinsesa Dahlia
1998	Tulak ng Bibig, Kabig ng Dibdib	Shirley
1999	Honey My Love... So Sweet	April
1999	Ikaw Lamang	Cecil
2000	Ika-13 Kapitulo	Angela
2000	Juan & Ted: Wanted	Hazel
2002	Mahal Kita, Final Answer	Nanette
2002	Akala Mo	Rhea
2003	Lastikman	Young Linda
2003	Alab ng Lahi	Jenny
2003	Filipinas	Lyra
2006	All About Love	Badong
2006	'Wag Kang Lilingon	Melissa / Nina
2007	Ang Cute Ng Ina Mo	Christine Outback
2008	When Love Begins	Michelle "Mitch" Valmonte
2008	Baler	Feliza Reyes
2009	Ang Panday	Adora
2010	Babe, I Love You	Sandra "Sasa" Sanchez
2010	In Your Eyes	Julia Delos Santos
2010	Petrang Kabayo	Kalesa Passenger
2011	Who's That Girl?	Elizabeth Pedroza
2011	No Other Woman	Kara Zalderiaga
2012	A Secret Affair	Rafaela "Rafi" Delgado
2014	The Gifted	Zoe Tuazon / Joey
2014	Blood Ransom	Crystal
2016	Bakit Lahat ng Gwapo may Boyfriend?	Kylie
2018	Sid & Aya: Not a Love Story	Aya
2018	BuyBust	Nina Manigan
2018	Aurora	Leana
2019	S.O.N.S.:Sons of Nanay Sabel	Wedding Singer
2019	Just a Stranger	Mae
2019	Unforgettable	Nurse Gem
2019	The Mall, the Merrier!	Morisette Molina
2025	Love You So Bad	Older Savannah
2026	The Loved One	Ellie

=== Television ===
Year	Title	Role	Notes
1997–1998	Ikaw na Sana	Jasmine	
1997–1999	T.G.I.S.	Emily "Em" Garcia	
2000	H2K Hati-Hating Kapatid	Jillian "Jill" Manansala-Sandejas	
2000	G-mik	Apple	
2000–2001	May Bukas Pa	Bea Miguel	
2001–2002	Beh Bote Nga	Genie Fer	
2001–2002	Anna Karenina	Ginny	
2002–2003	Ang Iibigin ay Ikaw	Rosanna Luarca	
2003	Ang Iibigin ay Ikaw Pa Rin	Rosanna Luarca	
2003	Magpakailanman	Annabelle Rama	Episode: "Nang Mang-abot ang Langit at Lupa" (The Annabelle Rama and Eddie Gutierrez Story)"
2003	Love to Love	Casey de Leon	
2003	Idol Ko si Kap	Gemma	
2003–2004	Nuts Entertainment	Herself	
2004	Eat Bulaga!	Herself (co-host)	
2004–2005	Hiram	Stephanie Borromeo	
2004; 2006	Maalaala Mo Kaya	Jing / Myra Mirinda Manibog / Monie / Erika	Episode role
2004–present	ASAP	Herself (co-host and performer)	
2005	Qpids	Herself (host)	
2005	Kampanerang Kuba	Fatima "Imang" De Vera / Bernadette	
2005–2006	The Buzz	Segment Presenter	
2006	Star Circle Quest	Herself (host)	
2006	Komiks	Beba / Athena - "Sarah Oliver"	
2006; 2007	Your Song	Ana / Lalaine / Allison	
2006; 2008	Love Spell	Rowena / Rina / Pearl	
2006–2007	Maging Sino Ka Man	Celine Magsaysay-Berenguer	
2007	Sineserye Presents: May Minamahal	Monica Fernandez-Tagle	
2007–2008	Maging Sino Ka Man: Ang Pagbabalik	Celine Magsaysay-Berenguer	
2008–2009	Dyosa	Josephine Sinukuan	
2009	The Wedding	Candice de Menes	
2009; 2010	May Bukas Pa	Carla Sandoval	
2009–present	It's Showtime	Herself (host)	
2010	Magpasikat	Herself (host)	
2011	Green Rose	Angela Tuazon	
2011	100 Days to Heaven	Tagabantay (Welgista)	
2013	Kailangan Ko'y Ikaw	Ruth Manrique	
2014	Mars Ravelo's Dyesebel	Beatriz "Dyesebel" Reyes-Montilla	
2016	I Love OPM	Herself (host)	
2016	We Love OPM	Herself (host)	
2016	FPJ's Ang Probinsyano	Katrina "Trina" Trinidad	
2019	Maalaala Mo Kaya	Marrz Balaoro	
2023	Drag Race Philippines	Herself (guest judge)	
2024	Family Feud	Guest	
2025	It's Okay to Not Be Okay	Emilia "Mia" Hernandez	
2026	BuyBust: The Undesirables †	Nina Manigan	

== Discography ==
=== Studio albums ===
Title	Album details	Certifications
Annebisyosa	Release date: 15 September 2011; Label: Viva Records; Formats: CD, Digital download	PARI: Platinum
The Forbidden Album	Release date: 2014; Label: Viva Records; Formats: CD, Digital download	
Forever Young	Release date: 4 March 2016; Label: Viva Records; Formats: CD, Digital download	

=== Compilation albums ===
Title	Album details
Showtime: The Album	Release date: 15 October 2010; Label: Star Records; Formats: CD, Digital download

== Concerts ==
Year	Title	Venue
2012	AnneBisyosa: No Other Concert	Smart Araneta Coliseum, Quezon City
2014	AnneKapal: The Forbidden Concert	Smart Araneta Coliseum, Quezon City
2018	AnneKulit: Promise, Last Na 'To (The 21st Anniversary Concert)	Smart Araneta Coliseum, Quezon City
2022	Luv-Anne	Newport Performing Arts Theater, Pasay

== Awards and nominations ==
Award	Year (Note: Indicates the year of ceremony. Each year is linked to the article about the awards held that year, wherever possible.)	Nominee / Work	Category	Result	Ref.
Aliw Awards	2012	Annebisyosa: No Other Concert	Best Major Concert (Female)	Nominated	
Aliw Awards	2019	Anne Curtis	People's Choice Award	Nominated	
Alta Media Icon Awards	2017	Anne Curtis	Most Influential Female TV Personality	Won	
Alta Media Icon Awards	2019	It's Showtime	Best Variety Show Host	Won	
Anak TV Seal Awards	2008	Anne Curtis	Makabata Star	Won	
Anak TV Seal Awards	2009	Anne Curtis	Makabata Star	Won	
Anak TV Seal Awards	2010	Anne Curtis	Makabata Star	Won	
Anak TV Seal Awards	2011	Anne Curtis	Makabata Star	Won	
Anak TV Seal Awards	2012	Anne Curtis	Makabata Star	Won	
Anak TV Seal Awards	2014	Anne Curtis	Makabata Star	Won	
Anak TV Seal Awards	2016	Anne Curtis	Makabata Star	Won	
Anak TV Seal Awards	2017	Anne Curtis	Makabata Hall of Famer	Won	
Anak TV Seal Awards	2023	Anne Curtis	Net Makabata Star	Won	
ASAP Pop Viewers' Choice Awards	2006	Anne Curtis	Pop Fashionista	Won	
ASAP Pop Viewers' Choice Awards	2007	Ang Cute ng Ina Mo!	Pop Love Team of the Year (Shared with Luis Manzano.)	Nominated	
ASAP Pop Viewers' Choice Awards	2007	Maging Sino Ka Man	Pop TV Character (Shared with John Lloyd Cruz, Bea Alonzo, and Sam Milby.)	Nominated	
ASAP Pop Viewers' Choice Awards	2007	Anne Curtis	Pop Female Fashionista	Won	
ASAP Pop Viewers' Choice Awards	2008	When Love Begins	Pop Screen Kiss (Shared with Aga Muhlach.)	Nominated	
ASAP Pop Viewers' Choice Awards	2008	Dyosa	Pop TV Character	Nominated	
ASAP Pop Viewers' Choice Awards	2008	Anne Curtis	Pop Female Fashionista	Nominated	
ASAP Pop Viewers' Choice Awards	2009	Anne Curtis	Pop Female Fashionista	Won	
ASAP Pop Viewers' Choice Awards	2010	"Beautiful Girl" by Christian Bautista	Pop Celebrity Cameo	Nominated	
ASAP Pop Viewers' Choice Awards	2010	Babe, I Love You	Pop Screen Kiss (Shared with Sam Milby.)	Nominated	
ASAP Pop Viewers' Choice Awards	2010	Babe, I Love You	Pop Love Team (Shared with Sam Milby.)	Won	
ASAP Pop Viewers' Choice Awards	2010	Anne Curtis	Pop Female Fashionista	Nominated	
ASAP Pop Viewers' Choice Awards	2010	Anne Curtis	Pop Cover Girl	Nominated	
ASAP Pop Viewers' Choice Awards	2011	Annebisyosa	Pop Female Artist	Nominated	
ASAP Pop Viewers' Choice Awards	2011	"Bumuhos Man Ang Ulan" by Jericho Rosales	Pop Celebrity Cameo	Nominated	
ASAP Pop Viewers' Choice Awards	2011	Anne Curtis	Pop Female Fashionista	Nominated	
ASAP Pop Viewers' Choice Awards	2011	Anne Curtis	Pop Cover Girl	Nominated	
ASAP Pop Viewers' Choice Awards	2011	Anne Curtis	Pop Twittezen	Nominated	
ASAP Pop Viewers' Choice Awards	2012	No Other Woman	Pop Screen Kiss (Shared with Derek Ramsay.)	Nominated	
ASAP Pop Viewers' Choice Awards	2012	No Other Woman	Pop Love Team (Shared with Derek Ramsay.)	Nominated	
ASAP Pop Viewers' Choice Awards	2012	Anne Curtis	Pop Female Fashionista	Nominated	
ASAP Pop Viewers' Choice Awards	2012	Anne Curtis	Pop Cover Girl	Nominated	
ASAP Pop Viewers' Choice Awards	2012	Anne Curtis	Pop Twittezen	Won	
ASAP Pop Viewers' Choice Awards	2013	Anne Curtis	Pop Female Fashionista	Nominated	
ASAP Pop Viewers' Choice Awards	2013	Anne Curtis	Pop Cover Girl	Nominated	
ASAP Pop Viewers' Choice Awards	2013	Anne Curtis	Pop Netizen	Nominated	
ASAP Pop Viewers' Choice Awards	2014	Mars Ravelo's Dyesebel	Pop TV Character	Nominated	
ASAP Pop Viewers' Choice Awards	2014	Anne Curtis	Pop Female Fashionista	Nominated	
ASAP Pop Viewers' Choice Awards	2014	Anne Curtis	Pop Cover Girl	Nominated	
ASAP Pop Viewers' Choice Awards	2014	Anne Curtis	Pop Twittezen	Nominated	
ASAP Pop Viewers' Choice Awards	2014	Anne Curtis	Pop Instagrammer	Nominated	
ASAP Pop Viewers' Choice Awards	2014	Anne Curtis	Pop Selfie	Nominated	
Barkada Choice Awards	2011	Anne Curtis	Choice Tweet Idol	Won	
Box Office Entertainment Awards	2012	No Other Woman	Box Office Queen (Shared with Cristine Reyes.)	Won	
Box Office Entertainment Awards	2012	Annebisyosa	Most Popular Female Novelty Singer	Won	
Box Office Entertainment Awards	2013	Annebisyosa: No Other Concert	Female Concert Performer of the Year	Won	
Box Office Entertainment Awards	2019	Anne Curtis	Golden Jury Award for Excellence as Millennial Multimedia Entertainer	Won	
ComGuild Academe's Choice Award	2014	Anne Curtis	Most Admired Female Endorser	Won	
Cosmopolitan Fun, Fearless Female Awards	2011	Anne Curtis	Ace Actress	Won	
EdukCircle Awards	2013	Anne Curtis	Most Influential Celebrity Endorsers of the Year	Won (Note: Tied with Kris Aquino, Coco Martin, Vic Sotto, Boy Abunda, Carmina Villarroel and Family, and Robin Padilla.)	
EdukCircle Awards	2014	Anne Curtis	Most Influential Celebrity Endorsers of the Year	Won (Note: Tied with Kris Aquino, John Lloyd Cruz, Richard Yap, Robin Padilla, Sarah Geronimo, Boy Abunda, Judy Ann Santos, Carmina Villarroel and Family, and Vic Sotto.)	
EdukCircle Awards	2015	Anne Curtis	Most Influential Celebrity Endorsers of the Year	Won (Note: Tied with Toni Gonzaga, Piolo Pascual, Vic Sotto, Carmina Villarroel and Family, Angel Locsin, Robin Padilla, Kris Aquino, Sarah Geronimo, and John Lloyd Cruz.)	
EdukCircle Awards	2015	Annekapal: The Forbidden Concert	Most Influential Concert Performers of the Year	Won (Note: Tied with Toni Gonzaga, Alex Gonzaga, Vice Ganda, Darren Espanto, and Regine Velasquez.)	
EdukCircle Awards	2016	Anne Curtis	Hall of Famer Most Influential Endorser	Won	
EdukCircle Awards	2017	It's Showtime	Best Female Variety Show Host	Won	
EdukCircle Awards	2018	Sid & Aya: Not a Love Story	Most Influential Film Actress of the Year	Won (Note: Tied with Alessandra de Rossi, Sarah Geronimo, Sharon Cuneta, and Pia Wurtzbach.)	
EdukCircle Awards	2019	It's Showtime	Best Female Talent Show Host	Won	
EdukCircle Awards	2019	It's Showtime	Best Female Noontime Show Host	Won	
EdukCircle Awards	2020	Anne Curtis	Most Influential Celebrities of the Decade	Won (Note: Tied with Sarah Geronimo, Daniel Padilla, Kathryn Bernardo, Maine Mendoza, Bea Alonzo, Vice Ganda, Coco Martin, Angel Locsin, and Alden Richards.)	
FAMAS Awards	2009	Baler	Best Actress	Nominated	
FAMAS Awards	2012	No Other Woman	Best Actress	Won	
FAMAS Awards	2013	A Secret Affair	Best Actress	Nominated	
FAMAS Awards	2019	Sid & Aya: Not a Love Story	Best Actress	Nominated	
FAMAS Awards	2019	Anne Curtis	Fernando Poe Jr. Memorial Award	Won	
Gawad Bedista	2017		Media Personality of the Year	Won	
Gawad Lasallianeta	2019	It's Showtime	Most Outstanding Female TV Personality	Won	
Gawad Lasallianeta	2019	Anne Curtis	Most Effective Celebrity Endorser	Won	
Gawad Lasallianeta	2020	Anne Curtis	Most Influential Entertainment Celebrity	Won	
Gawad Lasallianeta	2023	It's Showtime	Most Outstanding Variety Show Host	Won	
Gawad Lasallianeta	2024	It's Showtime	Most Outstanding Female Entertainment Show Host	Won	
Gawad Lasallianeta	2026	It's Okay Not To Be Okay	Most Outstanding Actress in a Lead Role	Won	
Gawad PASADO	2009	Baler	Pinakapasadong Aktres	Nominated	
Gawad PASADO	2012	No Other Woman	Pinakapasadong Aktres	Won (Note: Tied with Angel Locsin.)	
Gawad Tanglaw	2023	Anne Curtis	Gawad sa Sining at Kultura ng Paglilingkod sa Bayan	Won	
Gawad Urian Awards	2019	BuyBust	Best Actress	Nominated	
Gawad Urian Awards	2019	Sid & Aya: Not a Love Story	Best Actress	Nominated	
GMA Gala	2023	Anne Curtis	Frontrow Luxxe Royalty	Won	
Golden Laurel Lyceans' Choice Media Awards	2016	Anne Curtis	Most Influential Social Media Personality	Won	
Golden Laurel Lyceans' Choice Media Awards	2017	Anne Curtis	Most Influential Social Media Personality	Nominated	
Golden Laurel Lyceans' Choice Media Awards	2022	It's Showtime	Best Variety Show Host/s (Shared with It's Showtime hosts.)	Won	
Golden Screen TV Awards	2013	It's Showtime	Outstanding Female Host in a Musical or Variety Program	Nominated	
Golden Screen TV Awards	2014	It's Showtime	Outstanding Female Host in a Musical or Variety Program	Won	
Golden Screen TV Awards	2015	It's Showtime	Outstanding Female Host in a Musical or Variety Program	Nominated	
History Maker Awards	2017	Anne Curtis	History Maker Award	Won	
International Film Festival & Awards Macao	2018	Anne Curtis	Asian Star: Up Next Award	Won	
Jeepney TV Fan Favorite Awards	2022	It's Showtime	Favorite Musical/Variety Show Host	Nominated	
Luna Awards	2009	Baler	Best Actress	Nominated	
Luna Awards	2011	In Your Eyes	Best Supporting Actress	Won	
Luna Awards	2019	Sid & Aya: Not a Love Story	Best Actress	Nominated	
Metro Manila Film Festival	2008	Baler	Best Actress	Won	
Metro Manila Film Festival	2018	Aurora	Best Actress	Nominated	
Metro Manila Film Festival	2018	Anne Curtis	Female Star of the Night	Won	
Myx Music Awards	2006	"I Need You" by Mark Bautista	Favorite Guest Appearance in a Music Video	Won	
Myx Music Awards	2011	"Breathe Again" by Chicosci	Favorite Guest Appearance in a Music Video	Nominated	
Myx Music Awards	2013	"XGF" by Sponge Cola feat. Chito Miranda and Los Magno	Favorite Guest Appearance in a Music Video	Nominated	
Nickelodeon Kids' Choice Awards	2014	Anne Curtis	Favorite Asian Act	Nominated	
Nwssu Students' Choice Awards	2023	It's Showtime	Best Female Host	Won	
Outdoor Advertising Association of the Philippines Tanaw Awards	2012	Anne Curtis	People's Choice Female Billboard Star Model of the Year	Won	
Paragala Central Luzon Media Awards	2016	Anne Curtis	Best Celebrity Advocacy	Won	
Paragala Central Luzon Media Awards	2017	Anne Curtis	Female Personality of the Year	Won	
Paragala Central Luzon Media Awards	2018	It's Showtime	Best Female Noontime Show Host	Won	
Paragala Central Luzon Media Awards	2020	Anne Curtis	Top Entertainment Personality	Won (Note: Tied with Angel Locsin, Kathryn Bernardo, Liza Soberano, Nadine Lustre, Daniel Padilla, Enrique Gil, and James Reid.)	
People's Choice Dangal ng Bayan Awards	2009	Anne Curtis	Best Actress and Commercial Endorser	Won	
People's Choice Excellence Awards	2009	Anne Curtis	Top Entertainer of the Year	Won	
People's Choice Excellence Awards	2009	Anne Curtis	People's Choice Seal of Excellence	Won	
PEP List Awards	2014	Anne Curtis	Single Most-read Pep Article	Won	
PEP List Awards	2014	Anne Curtis	Face of the Year	Won	
PEP List Awards	2014	Anne Curtis	Razziest (Most-viewed PEParazzi item)	Won	
PEP List Awards	2014	Anne Curtis	Editors' Choice Female FAB Award	Won	
PEP List Awards	2014	It's Showtime	Editors' Choice Female TV Star of the Year	Nominated	
PEP List Awards	2017	It's Showtime	Female TV Star of the Year	Nominated	
PMPC Star Awards for Movies	2009	Baler	Movie Actress of the Year	Nominated	
PMPC Star Awards for Movies	2011	In Your Eyes	Movie Actress of the Year	Nominated	
PMPC Star Awards for Movies	2012	No Other Woman	Movie Actress of the Year	Nominated	
PMPC Star Awards for Movies	2015	The Gifted	Movie Actress of the Year	Nominated	
PMPC Star Awards for Movies	2015	Anne Curtis	Darling of the Press	Nominated	
PMPC Star Awards for Movies	2016	Anne Curtis	Darling of the Press	Nominated	
PMPC Star Awards for Movies	2019	BuyBust	Movie Actress of the Year	Nominated	
PMPC Star Awards for Movies	2021	Just a Stranger	Movie Love Team of the Year (Shared with Marco Gumabao.)	Nominated	
PMPC Star Awards for Music	2012	Annebisyosa: No Other Concert	Concert of the Year	Nominated	
PMPC Star Awards for Music	2012	Annebisyosa	New Female Recording Artist of the Year	Nominated	
PMPC Star Awards for Television	2007	Maging Sino Ka Man	Best Drama Actress	Nominated	
PMPC Star Awards for Television	2009	Anne Curtis	Female Star of the Night	Won	
PMPC Star Awards for Television	2010	Showtime	Best Talent Search Program Hosts (Shared with Showtime hosts.)	Nominated	
PMPC Star Awards for Television	2011	Showtime	Best Talent Search Program Hosts (Shared with Showtime hosts.)	Nominated	
PMPC Star Awards for Television	2011	Green Rose	Best Drama Actress	Nominated	
PMPC Star Awards for Television	2012	It's Showtime	Best Reality/Game Show Host (Shared with It's Showtime hosts.)	Won	
PMPC Star Awards for Television	2013	It's Showtime	Best Female TV Host	Won	
PMPC Star Awards for Television	2014	It's Showtime	Best Female TV Host	Nominated	
PMPC Star Awards for Television	2015	It's Showtime	Best Female TV Host	Won	
PMPC Star Awards for Television	2016	It's Showtime	Best Female TV Host	Won	
PMPC Star Awards for Television	2016	I Love OPM	Best Talent Search Program Hosts (Shared with Eric Nicolas.)	Nominated	
PMPC Star Awards for Television	2017	It's Showtime	Best Female TV Host	Nominated	
PMPC Star Awards for Television	2018	It's Showtime	Best Female TV Host	Nominated	
PMPC Star Awards for Television	2019	It's Showtime	Best Female TV Host	Won	
PMPC Star Awards for Television	2021	It's Showtime	Best Female TV Host	Nominated	
PMPC Star Awards for Television	2025	It's Showtime	Best Female TV Host	Won	
Push Awards	2015	Anne Curtis	Push Like Favorite Female Celebrity	Nominated	
Push Awards	2015	Anne Curtis	Push Tweet Most Loved Female Celebrity	Nominated	
Push Awards	2015	Anne Curtis	Push Gram Most Popular Female Celebrity	Nominated	
Push Awards	2015	Anne Curtis	Push Play Best Female Celebrity	Nominated	
Push Awards	2016	Anne Curtis	Push Like Most Favorite Female Celebrity	Nominated	
Push Awards	2016	Anne Curtis	Push Tweet Most Favorite Female Celebrity	Nominated	
Push Awards	2016	Anne Curtis	Push Gram Most Popular Female Celebrity	Nominated	
Push Awards	2016	Anne Curtis	Push Play Best Female Celebrity	Nominated	
Push Awards	2016	Anne Curtis	Push Awesome Popular Female Fashion Icon	Nominated	
Push Awards	2017	Anne Curtis	Push Female Celebrity	Nominated	
Push Awards	2017	Anne Curtis	Celebrity Fitspiration of the Year	Nominated	
Push Awards	2017	Anne Curtis	Celebrity Traveler of the Year	Won	
Push Awards	2017	Anne Curtis	Celebrity Fashionista of the Year	Nominated	
Push Awards	2019	Anne Curtis	Push Female Celebrity of the Year	Nominated	
Push Awards	2019	It's Showtime	Push Celebrity Host of the Year	Nominated	
Push Awards	2019	Anne Curtis	Push Celebrity Traveler of the Year	Nominated	
Push Awards	2019	Anne Curtis	Push Celebrity Fitspiration of the Year	Nominated	
Push Awards	2019	Anne Curtis	Push Celebrity Style Inspo of the Year	Nominated	
Push Awards	2022	Anne Curtis	Push Celebrity Mom of the Year	Won	
Push Awards	2023	Anne Curtis	Push Celebrity Mom of the Year	Nominated	
Push Awards	2024	Anne Curtis	Push Celebrity Parents of 2023 (Shared with Erwan Heussaf.)	Nominated	
Rawr Awards	2015	Anne Curtis	Female Celebrity of the Year	Nominated	
Rawr Awards	2015	Anne Curtis	Advocate of the Year	Nominated	
Rawr Awards	2015	Anne Curtis	Fashionable Celebrity of the Year	Nominated	
Rawr Awards	2018	BuyBust	Actress of the Year	Nominated	
Rawr Awards	2018	Annekulit: Promise, Last Na 'To!	Favorite Performer	Nominated	
Rawr Awards	2018	Anne Curtis	The Advocate	Nominated	
Rawr Awards	2023	It's Showtime	Favorite TV Host	Nominated	
Sine Sandaan: Celebrating the Luminaries of Philippine Cinema	2019	Anne Curtis	Leading Lady ng Sentenaryo	Included	
Star Magic Ball	2007	Anne Curtis	Best Dressed Female of the Night	Won	
Star Magic Ball	2008	Anne Curtis	Sparkling Couple of the Night (Shared with Sam Milby.)	Won	
Star Magic Ball	2009	Anne Curtis	Most Glamorous Celebrity of the Night	Won	
Star Magic Ball	2010	Anne Curtis	Most Glamorous Celebrity of the Night	Won	
Tambayan OPM Awards	2012	"Tinamaan Ako"	Song of the Year	Nominated	
Tambayan OPM Awards	2012	Annebisyosa	Phenomenal Entertainer of the Year	Won (Note: Tied with Vice Ganda.)	
UmalahokJUAN Awards	2015	It's Showtime	Best Female TV Personality	Won	
UmalahokJUAN Awards	2016	Anne Curtis	Best Celebrity Advocacy	Won	
Us Girls August Awards	2009	Anne Curtis	Face of the Year	Nominated	
Us Girls August Awards	2009	Anne Curtis	Most Fashionable	Won (Note: Tied with Bea Soriano, Bianca Valerio, Divine Lee, and Marie Lozano.)	
Us Girls August Awards	2010	Anne Curtis	Best Dressed	Won (Note: Tied with Iza Calzado, Georgina Wilson, Mai Kaufman, and Kelly Misa.)	
Us Girls August Awards	2011	Anne Curtis	Icon of the Year	Won	
USTv Students' Choice Awards	2009	Dyosa	Students' Choice of Actress in a Daily Soap Opera	Won	
USTv Students' Choice Awards	2013	It's Showtime	Students' Choice of Variety Show Host	Won	
USTv Students' Choice Awards	2014	It's Showtime	Students' Choice of Variety Show Host	Won	
USTv Students' Choice Awards	2016	It's Showtime	Students' Choice of Variety Show Host	Won	
Venus Ball	2008	Anne Curtis	Venus of the Night	Won	
VP Choice Awards	2020	Just a Stranger	Movie Actress of the Year	Nominated	
VP Choice Awards	2021	Anne Curtis	TV Female Icon of the Decade	Nominated	
Yahoo OMG! Celebrity Awards	2011	Anne Curtis	Hottest Actress	Nominated	
Yahoo OMG! Celebrity Awards	2012	Anne Curtis	Celebrity of the Year	Won	
Yahoo OMG! Celebrity Awards	2013	Anne Curtis	Actress of the Year	Nominated	
Yahoo OMG! Celebrity Awards	2013	Anne Curtis	Celebrity of the Year	Nominated	
Yahoo OMG! Celebrity Awards	2014	Anne Curtis	Social Media Star of the Year	Nominated	
