= Annebisyosa =

Anne Bisyosa

Studio album by Anne Curtis
- Released: September 15, 2011
- Recorded: 2011
- Genre: Pop
- Length: 31:37
- Label: Viva
- Producers: Vic Del Rosario, Jr., Vincent Del Rosario & Veronique R. Corpus (exec.) MG O. Mozo, Guia Gil-Ferrer

AnneBisyosa is the debut studio album by Filipino-Australian actress & recording artist Anne Curtis. It was released on September 15, 2011. The album features fun, positive, and bubbly tracks.

== Composition ==
The album is composed of six revival tracks & two original songs (one of which is actually the jingle of one of her endorsements). The opening track is the original song "Tinamaan Ako", the song is a fun positive pop song. The next two tracks are ballads, such as a cover of "Alone" by Heart and a collaboration with Sarah Geronimo for "Total Eclipse of the Heart".

The fourth track is her edgy pop take on Merril Bainbridge's "Mouth". The fifth track is her sweet cover of New Order's "Bizarre Love Triangle". It is followed by a cover of Cyndi Lauper’s "Girls Just Wanna Have Fun" and a pop cover of Cathy Dennis' 90s hit "Too Many Walls" remixed and arranged by It's Showtime residence DJ M.O.D. The album also consist a bonus track the "GSM Blue Jingle".

== Singles ==
The lead single from the album is "Tinamaan Ako".

== Promotion ==
No Other Concert: World Tour
- Tour by Anne Curtis
- Associated album: Annebisyosa
- Start date: January 28, 2012

=== No Other Concert: World Tour ===
To further promote the album, Curtis embarked a concert tour. The first concert took place at the Smart Araneta Coliseum. The concert was directed for television by Rico Gutierrez with stage direction by Georcelle Dapat Sy of G-Force while Marvin Querido served as musical director and lighting design by Shakira Villa Symes.

=== Sequels ===
In 2014, Annebisyosa evolved into a concert sequel titled AnneKapal (The Forbidden Concert Round 2) which also became a successful concert at the Araneta Coliseum. The show featured Anne doing aerial stunts which was directed and choreographed by Goercelle Dapat Sy with Marvin Querido as musical director and lighting design by Shakira Villa Symes.

== Track listing ==
No.	Title	Length
1.	"Tinamaan Ako"	4:28
2.	"Alone"	4:13
3.	"Total Eclipse of the Heart"	6:08
4.	"Mouth"	3:32
5.	"Bizarre Love Triangle"	2:10
6.	"Girls Just Wanna Have Fun"	3:38
7.	"Too Many Walls"	3:50

Bonus tracks
No.	Title	Length
8.	"GSM Blue Jingle"	2:59
