= PMPC Star Award for Best Talent Search Program =

The PMPC Star Award for Best Talent Search Program is given to the best talent search programs of the year and also talent search program hosts since 2004 (formerly known as "Best Talent Show & Host since 1987-89).

== Winners ==
Year	Program/Show (Station)	Host/s (Program/Station)
1987	Ang Bagong Kampeon (RPN 9)	
1988	Ang Bagong Kampeon (RPN 9)	
1989		
2004	Star Circle Quest (ABS-CBN 2) & StarStruck (GMA 7) [tied]	Luis Manzano and Jodi Sta. Maria (Star Circle Quest / ABS-CBN 2) & Jolina Magdangal (StarStruck Kids / GMA 7) [tied]
2005	Search For The Star In A Million (ABS-CBN 2)	Luis Manzano & Jodi Sta. Maria (Star Circle National Teen Quest, ABS-CBN 2)
2006	StarStruck: The Nationwide Invasion (GMA 7)	Regine Velasquez (Pinoy Pop Superstar / GMA 7)
2007	StarStruck: The Next Level (GMA 7)	Dingdong Dantes, Raymond Gutierrez and Jolina Magdangal (StarStruck: The Next Level / GMA 7)
2008	Shall We Dance? (ABC 5)	Arnel Ignacio, Dominic Ochoa and Lucy Torres-Gomez (Shall We Dance? / ABC 5)
2009	Talentadong Pinoy (TV5)	Ryan Agoncillo (Talentadong Pinoy / TV5)
2010	Showtime (ABS-CBN 2)	Billy Crawford and Luis Manzano (Pilipinas Got Talent / ABS-CBN 2)
2011	Showtime (ABS-CBN 2) & Talentadong Pinoy (TV5) [tied]	Billy Crawford and Luis Manzano (Pilipinas Got Talent / ABS-CBN 2)
2012	Talentadong Pinoy (TV5)	Billy Crawford and Luis Manzano (Pilipinas Got Talent / ABS-CBN 2)
2013	Talentadong Pinoy Worldwide (TV5)	Toni Gonzaga, Alex Gonzaga & Robi Domingo (The Voice of the Philippines / ABS-CBN 2)
2014	Celebrity Dance Battle (TV5)	Alex Gonzaga and Luis Manzano (The Voice Kids / ABS-CBN 2)
2015	A Song of Praise Music Festival (UNTV 37)	Billy Crawford (Your Face Sounds Familiar / ABS-CBN)
2016	StarStruck (GMA 7)	Luis Manzano, Robi Domingo and Kim Chiu (The Voice Kids (season 3) / ABS-CBN)
2017	A Song of Praise Music Festival (UNTV 37)	Toni Gonzaga and Luis Manzano (The Voice Teens / ABS-CBN)
2018	Not given	Luis Manzano (I Can See Your Voice / ABS-CBN)
2019	The Clash (GMA 7)	Luis Manzano and Pia Wurtzbach (World of Dance Philippines / ABS-CBN)
2020	The Clash (GMA 7)	Luis Manzano (I Can See Your Voice / ABS-CBN)
2021	The Clash (GMA 7)	Rayver Cruz and Julie Anne San Jose (The Clash / GMA 7)
2024	Not given	Rayver Cruz and Julie Anne San Jose (The Clash / GMA 7)

=== Total of number of awardees ===
- Luis Manzano - 11 awards (shared)
- Billy Crawford - 4 awards (3 shared & 1 solo)
- Alex Gonzaga - 2 awards (shared)
- Robi Domingo - 2 awards (shared)
- Jolina Magdangal - 2 awards (1 shared & 1 solo)
- Jodi Sta. Maria - 2 awards (shared)
- Julie Anne San Jose - 2 awards (shared)
- Rayver Cruz - 2 awards (shared)

Notes

- Showtime was changed category as "Best Reality & Game Show" in 2012, "Best Variety Show" in 2013 & 2014 as It's Showtime! and "Best Musical Variety Show" in 2015 to present.
- Luis Manzano have 2 nominations & 11 won awards (need more 4 awards will be the next PMPC Star Awards for TV's Hall of Fame).
