= All About Love (2006 film) =

- All About Love Film Poster
- Directed by: Bb. Joyce Bernal; Don Cuaresma; Jerry Lopez Sineneng
- Written by: John Paul Abellera; Arah Jell Badayos; Jennilee Chuaunsu; Carmi Raymundo; Vanessa Valdez
- Starring: John Lloyd Cruz; Bea Alonzo; Anne Curtis; Luis Manzano; Angelica Panganiban; Jason Abalos
- Cinematography: Christopher Manjares; Charlie Peralta; Ramoncito Redoble
- Edited by: Renewin Alano
- Music by: Jesse Lasaten
- Production company: Star Cinema
- Release date: May 31, 2006
- Running time: 118 minutes
- Country: Philippines
- Language: Filipino
- Box office: ₱89 million

All About Love is a 2006 Filipino romantic drama film directed by Joyce E. Bernal, Don Cuaresma, and Jerry Lopez Sineneng. It was released under Star Cinema. John Lloyd Cruz won the 2007 Luna Award for Best Actor, handed out by the Film Academy of the Philippines, for his performance in the film.

Three stories of love, courage, trust and taking a risk come in one film to tell us how love touches us in countless ways. Everything is really "all about love".

The nature of love is explored in this trio of short films from the Philippines. In "Promdi", two childhood friends Kikay (Angelica Panganiban) and Kiko (Jason Abalos) discover their relationship has blossomed into love meanwhile Spanky (Neil Ferreira) after matches the gambling addictive for Kikay and Kiko friend towards Spanky defends a recovering discussion.

In "Kalesa", a responsible young woman Badong (Anne Curtis) and a flashy playboy Wesley (Luis Manzano) fall in love despite their differences.

And in "About Anna", two heartbroken people Eric (John Lloyd Cruz) and Lia (Bea Alonzo) find comfort in each other's arms.

== Plot ==
=== Promdi ===
Kikay (Angelica Panganiban) and Kiko (Jason Abalos) grew up together in the province and built a strong friendship. But Kikay has to leave her best friend to live and study in Manila. She tries to fit in her new environment in the city but she ends up being abused by the people she thought as her new friends. Kikay returns to the province with a wounded self-esteem. There, she realizes how much Kiko loves her.

Feeling unworthy of his love, Kikay drives Kiko away. But will she ever find the courage to come face to face with her own problems and admit her love for him?

=== Kalesa ===
After a bout with stroke paralyzed her father, Badong (Anne Curtis) took the responsibility of earning for her family by taking over his job as a kutsero (kalesa driver). She figures in an accident and a fight involving her horse, an expensive sports car and Wesley (Luis Manzano), the seemingly playboy model. But romance creeps into their cat-dog relationship. He shows her his true love but she contains her feelings and refuses to believe that a rich guy could really fall in love with a woman of her status.

Will Badong learn how to trust Wesley and tell him she really wants to be with him?

=== About Anna ===
Eric (John Lloyd Cruz) and Lia (Bea Alonzo) are two broken people. Lia recently lost her faith in love when her fiancé got another girl pregnant while Eric is trying to convince himself that he has moved on from the death of his beloved girlfriend, Anna. To prove that he has finally gotten over his loss, Eric recorded his voice on tape and intentionally misplaced it as a symbol of letting go. By some twist of fate, Lia was able to get the tape and was instantly moved by the greatness of the voice's love for the girl. Lia decided to search for the voice to prove that true love is real and still exists. Unbeknownst to her, the one she is looking for is just living next door – her annoying neighbor, Eric. But just as when they were already getting along, Eric discovers that Lia has his tape. The pain suddenly started coming back. He tries to convince her that the voice doesn't exist but ends up falling in love with her.

Will Lia ever believe in true love again?

Three stories of love, fate and courage come in one film to tell a story of how love touches us in countless ways. The movie ends with all three couples on a terrace and they kiss one by one.

== Cast ==
=== Main cast ===
- John Lloyd Cruz as Eric
- Bea Alonzo as Lia
- Anne Curtis as Badong
- Luis Manzano as Wesley
- Angelica Panganiban as Kikay
- Jason Abalos as Kiko

=== Also starring ===
- Joem Bascon as Ryan
- Miko Palanca as Rob
- Mikel Campos as JP
- Neil Ferreira as Spanky
- Maoui David as Vanessa
- Paw Diaz as Stephanie
- Eva Darren as Kikay's Lola
- Lito Pimentel as Bogart
- Empoy Marquez as Don-Don
- Pia Wurtzbach as Carmi
- Juddha Paolo as Archie
- Lee Simon Brown as Emong
- Margarita Saludo as Rachel
- Gina Alajar as Anna's mom
- Jackie Lou Blanco as Mrs. Villanueva
- Jean Garcia as Kikay's mom
- Jed Madela as himself/singer

== Trivia ==
Abalos and Panganiban were from Vietnam Rose since it ended on February 10 three months later, Curtis and Manzano were from Kampanerang Kuba which ended on December 16, 2005 five months later and Cruz and Alonzo were from the success of their movie Close to You which premiered three months later on February 15.

== Awards and recognition ==
- 25th Luna Awards - Best Actor - John Lloyd Cruz
