= 'Wag Kang Lilingon =

- Theatrical release poster
- Directed by: Jerry Lopez Sineneng (segment "Salamin"); Quark Henares (segment "Uyayi")
- Written by: Ricky Lee
- Produced by: Charo Santos-Concio; Malou N. Santos; Vic del Rosario Jr.
- Starring: Kristine Hermosa; Anne Curtis; Marvin Agustin
- Cinematography: Chris Manjares (segment "Salamin"); Lyle Sacris (segment "Uyayi")
- Edited by: Marya E. Ignacio
- Production company: Viva Films
- Distributed by: ABS-CBN Film Productions (Note: Co-produced and co-distributed under the joint label, Star Cinema/ABS-CBN Film Productions Inc.)
- Release date: November 15, 2006
- Running time: 97 minutes
- Country: Philippines
- Language: Filipino
- Box office: ₱34 million

'Wag Kang Lilingon (English: Don't Turn Away; more specifically Don't Look Back) is a 2006 Filipino horror anthology film directed by Jerry Lopez Sineneng and Quark Henares and starring Anne Curtis and Kristine Hermosa. It was the first film co-produced by Viva Films and Star Cinema years after Viva ended its ties with ABS-CBN in 2001.

== Plot ==
The plot is separated into three parts: Uyayi, Salamin, and the film's epilogue.

=== Uyayi (Lullaby) ===
Nurse Melissa seeks help from her boyfriend James to investigate mysterious deaths at Angel of Mercy Hospital. Melissa suspects Dr. Carl but discovers that James was a former patient with a troubled past. As the hauntings intensify, Melissa's sanity deteriorates, and she ultimately reveals herself as the killer, severely burning half of James' face and seemingly killing him.

=== Salamin (Mirror) ===
Rosing and her daughters move into a new house. They discover a mirror in the basement and perform a ritual, unknowingly releasing the spirits of the house's previous tenants. Hauntings escalate, and they seek help from a psychic who advises them to get rid of the mirror. They leave the house, but the spirits follow them. Angel confronts the killer, Nestor, in the basement. With the help of her family and the ghosts, they defeat Nestor, but Angel, Lander, Trixie, and Rosing die.

=== Epilogue ===
In the epilogue, it is revealed that Nina, now called Melissa, became a nurse at the Angel of Mercy hospital, built on her childhood home's site. She is haunted by the same spirits. Melissa appears to be delusional, conversing with James, Angel, and Rosing. The film ends with James awakening and attacking Melissa.

== Cast and characters ==
=== Uyayi (Lullaby) ===
- Anne Curtis as Melissa/Nina
- Marvin Agustin as James
- Raymond Bagatsing as Dr. Carl

=== Salamin (Mirror) ===
- Kristine Hermosa as Angel
- Cherry Pie Picache as Rosing
- Celine Lim as Nina
- Soliman Cruz as Mang Nestor
- Dimples Romana as Trixie
- Baron Geisler as Red
- Archie Alemania as Lander
- Caloy Olavides as Ghost 1
- Julia Clarete as Maila L. Santiago/Crying Lady/White Lady
- Jade Castro as Ghost 2
- Reymark Roy as Bloody Ghost
- Edwin Pamanian as Burned Patient/Ghost
- Zaider Vargas as Luwa-mata Ghost
- Alex Turcino as Deep Cut Wound Ghost
- Ace Bautista as Pale Face Ghost
- Bong Gonzales as Pale Veins Ghost
- Virgo Santana as Deep Cut Wound Ghost

== See also ==
- List of ghost films
