= Bud Brothers Series (TV series) =

- Title card
- Genre: Drama; Romance; Comedy
- Created by: ABS-CBN Studios
- Based on: The Bud Brothers Series by Rose Tan
- Developed by: ABS-CBN Studios
- Directed by: Cathy Garcia-Molina
- Starring: See Below
- Opening theme: "Way Back Into Love" by Sam Milby and Toni Gonzaga
- Country of origin: Philippines
- Original language: Filipino
- No. of episodes: 85

Production
- Executive producers: Carlo Katigbak; Cory Vidanes; Laurenti Dyogi
- Running time: 30–33 minutes
- Production company: Star Creatives Group

Original release
- Network: ABS-CBN
- Release: May 4 – August 28, 2009

Bud Brothers Series is a 2009 Philippine television drama romance series broadcast by ABS-CBN. The series is based on the Filipino pocket book novel of the same title The Bud Brothers Series created by Rose Tan, the series is the first installment of Precious Hearts Romances Presents. Directed by Cathy Garcia-Molina, it aired on the network's Hapontastic line up and worldwide on TFC from May 4 to August 28, 2009, replacing Pieta and was replaced by Precious Hearts Romances Presents: Ang Lalaking Nagmahal Sa Akin.

The series is currently available on Jeepney TV's YouTube Channel.

== Story ==
Precious Hearts Romances, the country's most celebrated publisher of pocket book love stories, is now the newest teleserye to lighten up the ABS-CBN Hapontastic (now Kapamilya Gold). On its initial offering, Precious Hearts Romances Presents a story written by Rose Tan entitled Bud Brothers.

Bud Brothers follows the story of eight male friends who together own a flower farm business. Vince, Wayne, Carlo, Pete, Rei, Ed, Monty, and Pio will each take on a journey of love and self-discovery with the different women who come into their respective lives.

== Name of Episodes by Book ==
- Stupid Cupids
- My Golly, Wow Betsey
- Red Roses for a Blue Lady
- Tails, You Lose; Heads, You're Mine
- He's the One
- Pepper's Roses
- Once in a Lifetime Love

=== Episodes ===
==== Book 1: Stupid Cupids ====
Vince and Georgie's relationship ended on a bad note.

The Bud Brothers celebrate the wedding of their friend Pio to his longtime girlfriend Sandy. But in the middle of the ceremony, Georgie barges in with a baby. She asks Pio for a place to stay in, but he comes up with a wicked plan. Georgie is later surprised when she finds herself at the house of Vince, her ex-boyfriend and Pio's best friend. Vince and Georgie's relationship ended on a bad note, and living under one roof, unresolved issues from their past will cause friction between the two. But amidst their squabble, Vince and Georgie will discover that they still have feelings for each other.

Georgie takes care of the baby, Mary. She told everyone that Mary is the daughter of her friend who died in Singapore and she let Georgie take her baby. Because Georgie feels that Pio is giving her too much, She decided to look for a job. She ended up looking for a job in the Bud Brothers Flower Farm. Georgie feels that Vince is making fun of her. She became Vince's Assistance.

Georgie finally meets Mary's father, Cheng, together with Lance. Cheng agrees that Mary stay with Georgie if she would let Mary know that he is her father and stay connected. This makes Georgie happy, but, because of all this, she forgets to attend an important meeting at the Bud Brothers Farm, thus making Vince unhappy. As the story progresses, an incident happens when Georgie thought she saw a ghost and dropped her cellphone out the window. But, this incident causes, Georgie to be close to Vince again. Georgie made up with his dad and went to live with him. One day, Vince went to her house and asked for her hand in marriage. Georgie's father approved and they were together once again. The other Bud Brothers confess that they did the incident where Georgie saw a ghost, the maid, Melba, purposely took all Georgie's stuff because of them, AND about the cashier, Jennifer, was part of it too. They did all this so that Georgie and Vince could be happy.

Vince and Georgie marry and go on their honeymoon. They are rarely seen in the series again.

==== Book 2: My Gulay, Wow Betchay ====
(Is originally published as "My Golly, Wow Betsey", but due to certain copyrights they translated the title into Filipino and renamed character "Betsey" into its Filipino form, "Betchay").

Elizabeth 'Betsey' or 'Betchay' Panganiban (Mariel Rodriguez) works as an assistant to famous model Alyssa, (Niña Jose) who one day comes to Betchay's house pleading for help. Alyssa thinks her boyfriend, Wayne, (Rafael Rosell) is cheating on her. So, she asks Betchay to "spy" on him by signing up as secretary at the Bud Brothers Farm. She later accepts this offer. She sees Wayne but fails the first time to meet him because she tripped in front of him.

As the story continues, in the office of Wayne, Betchay thought that he had left so she continued her mission to find signs of Wayne cheating on his girlfriend. But, when she hears Wayne coming, she goes through the nearby window, hoping to escape, not noticing the hibiscus underneath. She crushes and destroys them accidentally. The hibiscus was important to Wayne, because they were to be shown to marketers soon and it also symbolized his dead daughter Cathy (which Betchay does not know about). When Wayne finds out, he gets furious and asks who did it. Betchay feels guilty and asks for Carlo's help. He says that she has to tell him, looking 'good and fresh'. That night, Wayne found out that his mom returned to the Philippines, accompanied by Alyssa. It is revealed that Alyssa is NOT Wayne's girlfriend and that she is just a stalker. Wayne accidentally tells his mom that he already has a wife, therefore, his mom wants to meet her. He needs to find a "wife" fast.

The next day, when Betchay apologizes, he forgives her, but there's a condition. Betchay has to be the "wife" of Wayne until his mom leaves. In which Betchay agrees, and so she moves in with Wayne. Their relationship develops slowly.. as their days in the house together adds up, they find themselves confused of their feelings towards each other. It is revealed later that Wayne's mom knew that Betchay and Wayne are not really husband and wife, but she still accepts the two of them. Betchay is disturbed with Catherine or Cathy, the girl she believed to be the love of Wayne's life, because she saw flowers with her name on it. Betchay becomes jealous. It is later revealed that Cathy wasn't Wayne's girlfriend but his late daughter, who died because she was running after him when he left his stubborn first wife, Gemma. He told that story to Betchay after he told her to marry him, and at the end Betchay & Wayne are together and got married.

==== Book 3: Red Roses for a Blue Lady ====
A newcomer and a pretty suspicious one, Coco triggers the curiosity of the town and draws their attention as the aswang of the village. Carlo then comes to her aid and defends her from their mockery and spiteful glares. To appease the town's people, Carlo volunteers to watch Coco and make sure that she would not be "killing" any other members of the community.

Spending more time with Coco, Carlo learns about Coco's painful past – the untimely death of her husband, Miguel, which led to Coco quitting painting altogether.

Despite Coco's hesitations and initial animosity to Carlo's tactics, Coco finds Carlo charming and funny. Carlo vows to take away Coco's sadness, to fill her days with happiness, and to get her back to painting.

When Coco's house is being robbed, she calls Carlo who saves her. To repay him, Coco agrees to Carlo's persuasive demand to paint a portrait of him. Carlo brings her to the island Wayne bought for Betchay, and they have a good time and fall in love.

Carlo is vocal about his feelings for Coco who has a hard time accepting it. Unperturbed, Carlo tells Coco that it was okay, that he will know Coco's true feelings after she is done with the painting because he believes that the painting would reveal her love for him. True enough, after Coco finishes Carlo's portrait, they had sex but Coco later feels guilt because she is not yet fully healed and moved on from Miguel.

Carlo helps her fully heal and move on by leaving her on Betchay's island alone to grieve. After, Coco goes home and paints again. Carlo goes after her and they finally got together.

==== Book 4: Tails, You Lose; Heads, You're Mine ====
Eccentric interior designer Tammy runs away from her fiancé, Damian. She stays with her aunt who works at Bud Brothers Flower Farm.

Tammy desperately asks Pete to pose as her boyfriend, and after basing his decision to a toss coin, he agrees to her plan. As the two begin their role-play, Tammy becomes close to Ed, another Bud Brother. When Tammy is starting to become friends with Ed, she discovers that Pete only connived with Ed to take her away. Tammy decides to turn the tables around by flirting with Ed, thus making Pete jealous. There's a love triangle in between Tammy, her fiancé and Pete.

==== Book 5: He's the One ====
The only thing that is getting in the way of the Bud Brothers Flower Farm's expansion plan is the rival flower shop across the street, Petals Flower Shop. The Bud Brothers task ex-commercial model Ed to seduce Hiromi, the fierce owner of the rival flower shop, and make her agree to a merge. But Hiromi refuses to surrender and fights the Bud Brothers.

One day, Hiromi's flower shop gets robbed, and Ed rushes to her rescue. He convinces her to come with him to Tagaytay for safety. During the vacation, Ed begins to understand how important the flower shop is to Hiromi, and he ends up conceding to the plan.

Hiromi returns to her province to be with her boyfriend. They decide to watch an erotic movie which rouses Hiromi's feelings for the man she really loves which is Ed.

==== Book 6: Pepper's Roses ====
Pepper and Rei have known each other since they were kids because their fathers are business partners and best friends. But Pepper and Rei grew apart after some time. One day, Pepper comes to Rei for help to fix the feud of their fathers. They tell their fathers that they are a couple, and after becoming excited, their fathers organize an engagement party.

Amidst the big lie, Rei and Pepper discover their love for one another. But before they can admit their true feelings, Pepper finds another woman's name on Rei's cellphone and thinks that he is still entertaining another girl. She accuses him of betraying her trust, while he accuses her of invading his privacy.

Pepper "calls off" the engagement, and finds out that her father and Rei's father have already reconciled and they are ready to pretend to still be fighting if it means Rei and Pepper get married. Pepper says there was no chance.

Realizing what Pepper needs from him, Rei goes after her and declares his love for her and she reciprocates.

==== Book 7: Once in a Lifetime Love ====
Seeing his Bud Brothers getting married one after the other, fickle minded Monty settles for a girl named Lily Rose. But Lily Rose's father doesn't approve of Monty, and the father wants her to marry Leon, a neuro-surgeon based in the US. The father asks his niece Sabel to drive Monty away.

But Sabel is attracted to Leon, so she makes a way for Monty and Lily Rose to elope. However, when Leon arrives from the US, Lily Rose admits that she also has feelings for him. Lily Rose then develops a plan to pair Sabel and Monty together so she can engage an affair with Leon who is the man she really loves. Sabel starts to fall for Monty but he is trying to end his playboy ways by sticking to one girl and will only settle for Lily Rose, even though feelings for Sabel have started to develop. What ending awaits this confusing affair?

== Cast and characters ==
=== Main cast ===
Book 1
Stupid Cupids
- Jake Cuenca as Vicente "Vince" Banaag - He is a quiet type and serious boyfriend. He will suddenly turn cold after his sad break up with Georgie.
- Cristine Reyes as Georgina "Georgie" Yulo - She was once a campus crush during her college years. She will turn Vince’s life around when she returns with a baby.

Book 2
My Gulay, Wow Betchay
- Rafael Rosell as Wayne Alban - He is the serious and secretive boss who will learn the meaning of ‘letting go’ because of Betchay.
- Mariel Rodriguez as Elizabeth "Betchay" Panganiban - She is an assistant to a famous supermodel on a mission to find out if Wayne is 'cheating' on her. Betchay is sent to pose as a secretary to find out the truth.

Book 3
Red Roses for a Blue Lady
- John Prats as Carlo Domingo - He is the comedian among the Bud Brothers.
- Denise Laurel as Corazon "Coco" Artiaga - She is a grieving widow who will learn the meaning of 'moving on' from Carlo.

Book 4
Tail, You Lose; Head, Your Mine
- Joem Bascon as Juan Pedro "Pete" Labrador - He grew up a ‘Mama’s Boy’ and bases his crucial decision on the game of ‘toss coin.’
- Janna Dominguez as Artemis "Tammy" Macapugay - She is an eccentric interior designer who, after running away from her fiancé and a huge debt, will end up living with Pete.

Book 5
He's the One
- Manuel Chua as Ed Lacson - He is the ‘pretty boy’ among the Bud Brothers. He will attempt to seduce the beautiful owner of a rival flower farm.
- Valerie Concepcion as Hiromi "Lady Tiger" Santa Maria - She owns the rival flower farm of the Bud Brothers. She will discover Ed’s ‘kinky’ past.

Book 6
Pepper's Roses
- Guji Lorenzana as Reynaldo "Rei" Arambulo - He plays guitar for his band with Monty and Pio.
- Kaye Abad as Peppermint "Pepper" Nuque -She works as a writer for a children’s fantasy show. She and Rei will connive to end the rift of their fathers.

Book 7
Once in a Lifetime Love
- Will Devaughn as Filemon "Monty" Geronimo - He is a playboy who has difficulty making mature decisions.
- Wendy Valdez as Isabelita "Sabel" Urbano - She is a psychologist who will use her expertise to drive Monty away, but she will later find herself falling for him.

Book 0.5
Ang Akin Ay Akin, Ang Iyo Ay Akin Pa Rin
- Ahron Villena as Pio Andong, Jr. - He is the leader of the Bud Brothers who is so driven to make the flower farm a huge success.
- Maricar Reyes as Cassandra "Sandy" Banting - She is the submissive and patient wife of Pio.

=== Guest cast ===
Book 1
Stupid Cupids
- Marco Morales as Lance Banaag - He is the brother of Vince Banaag
- Chinggoy Alonzo as George Yulo - Georgie's father
- Erika Padilla as Jennifer - She is the cousin of Sandy, Pio's wife. She have a big crush on Vince
- Kristel Moreno as Feliciana - She is former girlfriend of Vince.

Book 2
My Gulay, Wow Betchay
- Niña Jose as Alyssa Rodriguez
- Raquel Villavicencio as Wayne's mother

Book 3
Red Roses for a Blue Lady
- Raquel Montessa as Coco's mother
Book 4
Heads you Lose, Tails your Mine
- Kian Kazemi as Damien
- Zaira dela Peña as Macy
- Dexter Doria as Pete's Mother
- Daisy Cariño as Minerva

Book 5
He's the One
- Nicole Uysiuseng as Sakura
- AJ Dee as Anton
- Kristopher Peralta as Migz
- Tess Antonio as Amy
- Josef Elizalde as Naruto
- Glenda Garcia as Tita Luz

Book 6
Pepper's Roses
- Boboy Garrovillo as Fidel -Pepper's Father
- Bodjie Pascua as Pepe - Rei's Father
- Regine Angeles as Jing - Friend of Pepper
- Anthea Murfet as Monique - Monty's Cousin

Book 7
Once in a Lifetime Love
- Krista Ranillo as Lily Rose
- Roy Alvarez as Lily Rose's Father
- Ram Sagad as Donnie
- Princess Ryan as Sheila
- Frank Garcia as Leon

Book 0.5
Ang Akin Ay Akin, Ang Iyo Ay Akin Pa Rin
- Ina Feleo as Ivy
- Leandro Baldemor as Jovi
- Jodi Sta. Maria as Jenny Aragon-Andong - She is the Mother of Pio.
- Aleck Bovick as Marissa - She is the Aunt of Sandy.

=== Special Participation ===
- CJ Ford as Young Vince
- Angel Sy as Young Georgina
- Francis Magundayao as Young Wayne
- Mika dela Cruz as Young Betchay
- Zaijian Jaranilla as Young Carlo
- Sharlene San Pedro as Young Julia
- Gail Lardizabal as Young Coco
- Jairus Aquino as Young Pete
- Celine Lim as Young Tammy
- Paul Salas as Young Ed
- Gemmae Custodio as Young Hiromi
- Joshua Dionisio as Young Rei
- Khaycee Aboloc as Young Pepper
- Mark Joshua Salvador as Young Monty
- Alexa Ilacad as Young Sabel
- Sophia Baars as Young Lily Rose
- Carlo Lacana as Young Pio
- Ella Cruz as Young Sandy
- Erin Panililio as Young Ivy

== Production ==
On February 12, 2009, ABS-CBN signed a contract with Precious Pages for the right to translate the series into a TV adaptation.

== Ratings ==
The show hit #1 on May 18, once "Book 2" was introduced, which starred Rafael Rosell and Mariel Rodriguez. It stayed number one for a week, and consistently stayed in the top 2 for another two weeks.

== Reruns ==
It first rerun on Jeepney TV.

It streamed for the first time online on Jeepney TV's YouTube Channel on its 3:00 PM and 3:30 PM timeslot replacing Mirabella, airing two episodes a day.

== See also ==
- List of programs broadcast by ABS-CBN
- Precious Hearts Romances Presents
