= Fruitcake (disambiguation) =

Fruitcake is a traditional cake made with chopped fruits and nuts.

Fruitcake or fruit cake may also refer to:

== Language ==
- Fruitcake (slang), a person alleged to suffer from insanity
- Fruit (slang), a gay man or LGBT person

== Music ==
- Fruitcakes Tour, a 1994 concert tour by Jimmy Buffett for his eponymous album Fruitcakes
- The Fruitcakes, a Polish band featuring Tomasz Ziętek
- Fruitcake (band), a jazz fusion band from the Netherlands established in the 1980s.

=== Records ===
- Fruit Cake (record), a 1952 record by Harry James and Toni Harper; see Harry James discography
- Fruitcake (Eraserheads EP), a 1996 EP by Eraserheads, a promotional EP for the eponymous album
- Fruitcake (Sabrina Carpenter EP), a 2023 EP by Sabrina Carpenter
- Fruitcake (album), a 1996 album by Filipino band Eraserheads
- Fruitcakes (album), a 1994 album by Jimmy Buffett

=== Songs ===
- "Fruitcake" (song), a 2010 song and single by The Superions from the Christmas album Destination... Christmas!
- "Fruitcake" (song), a 2006 song by Stone Sour from Come What(ever) May
- "Fruitcake" (song), a 1996 song by Eraserheads, the title track of the eponymous album Fruitcake (album)
- "Fruitcakes" (song), a 1994 song by Jimmy Buffett, the title track of the eponymous album Fruitcakes (album)
- "Swimmin' Home, Baby (Fruit Cake)" (song), a 1964 tune by Willis Jackson off the album 'Gator Tails

== Literature ==
- Fruitcakes (series), a 2000s novel series by Rose Tan
- Fruitcake (book), a 2006 children's book by Haya Saleh

== Sports ==
- Fruitcakes (boat), a sailboat competing at the 1990 J/24 World Championship
- Fruit Cake (horse), a racehorse, the winner of the 1917 Woodstock Stakes

== Other uses ==
- Fruitcake (film), an unmade 2008-planned film by director John Waters
- "Fruit Cake" (segment), a TV segment in season 6 of The Best Thing I Ever Ate
- Fruitcake Bluff, Thompson Spur, Daniels Range, Victoria Land, Antarctica; an outcrop
- Fruit Cake Island, a fictional location from the 1896 fantasy novel The Magical Monarch of Mo

== See also ==
- Christmas cake, a type of fruitcake served at Christmas time in the UK, Ireland, Japan, Philippines and many Commonwealth countries
- "Doctor Fruit Cake", a 1971 episode of Lollipop Loves Mr Mole
- Dr. Fruitcake, a fictional character from The Mr. Potato Head Show
- Fruit Cake Lady from the Tonight Show
- fruitcake model of the atom
- FruitQuake, a flavor, fruitcake, of Mountain Dew; see List of Mountain Dew flavors and varieties
