= Somewhere in My Heart (TV series) =

- Title Card
- Genre: Drama; Romance; Comedy
- Created by: ABS-CBN Studios
- Based on: Somewhere In My Heart by Rose Tan
- Developed by: ABS-CBN Studios
- Directed by: Cathy Garcia-Molina
- Starring: Kaye Abad; Guji Lorenzana
- Opening theme: "Way Back Into Love" by Sam Milby and Toni Gonzaga
- Country of origin: Philippines
- Original language: Filipino
- No. of episodes: 35

Production
- Executive producers: Carlo Katigbak; Cory Vidanes; Laurenti Dyogi
- Running time: 30–35 minutes
- Production company: Star Creatives Group

Original release
- Network: ABS-CBN
- Release: October 19 – December 4, 2009

Somewhere in My Heart is a 2009 Philippine television drama romance series broadcast by ABS-CBN. The series is based on the Filipino pocket book novel of the same title created by Rose Tan, the series is the third installment of Precious Hearts Romances Presents. Directed by Cathy Garcia-Molina, it stars Kaye Abad and Guji Lorenzana. It aired on the network's Hapontastic line up and worldwide on TFC from October 19 to December 4, 2009, replacing Precious Hearts Romances Presents: Ang Lalaking Nagmahal Sa Akin and was replaced by Precious Hearts Romances Presents: My Cheating Heart.

The series is currently streaming on Jeepney TV's YouTube Channel at a timeslot of 7:00 PM replacing Precious Hearts Romances Presents: My Cheating Heart

== Plot ==
The story revolves on two different characters Femi (Kaye Abad) and Aaron (Guji Lorenzana), the two college well-known people of their school. It revolves on these two main protagonists; Femi, a free-spirited young female whose liberated lifestyle is the only way to pave a good life and unfortunately give positivity, and Aaron on the other hand, is from a rich family whose father pushes him to work for the family business but his creative passion is art. Femi tries her best to get Aaron's attention even seducing him but Aaron knows how Femi is. These two unlike personalities who meet an unlikely attraction ensues. But when Aaron dumps Femi, Femi leaves the college in order to let go of this dilemma and heartbreak and humiliation she has suffered. 10 years later as all else failed, she lives in the present its 2009, and she is a hairstylist, but still up to her old ways now she has to lie that she is a nun, in order for Aaron to leave her alone. Will Femi learn her lesson on lying and trust?

== Cast and Characters ==
=== Main Cast ===
- Kaye Abad as Eufemia ‘Femi’ Dalisay - With her free spirited character, Femi is often perceived by people as a liberated woman. She is determined to try out every available means of livelihood so she can provide for her family. Femi has decided to set aside her love life, but everything will change when she meets the campus heartthrob Aaron.
- Guji Lorenzana as Aaron Gorospe - Born into a rich family, Aaron is taking up a Business Management course because his father wants him to be in charge of their business in the future. However, he has a different dream for himself. Good looking, quiet, and mysterious, Aaron is the heartthrob of the campus. In spite having an easy time with the girls, he is looking for the ‘one’ who will love him for who he really is.

=== Supporting Cast ===
- Mat Ranillo III as Arnulfo Gorospe
- Gillete Sandico as Trina Gorospe
- Nikki Valdez as Amanda
- Ahron Villena as Crispollo/Justin Rodriguez
- Erika Padilla as Amy
- Lloyd Zaragoza as Bogs
- Luane Dy as Andrea Cusi
- Princess Ryan as Denise Silva
- Niña Dolino as Annette Gorospe
- Nicole Uysiuseng as Myra
- Malou Crisologo as Mother Prioress
- Debra Liz as Sister Stella
- Beauty Gonzalez as Sister Claire

=== Guest Cast ===
- Yayo Aguila as Michelle Dalisay
- Neil Ryan Sese as Father of Menggay
- Krista Ranillo as Mother of Menggay
- Tiya Pusit as Petra Mirafuentes
- Angelo Garcia as Jon-Jon
- Amy Nobleza as Ben-Ben
- Nikki Samonte as Menggay
- Kristel Moreno as Paula
- Mark Manicad as Basil
- Dyaz Min Ramirez as Mia
- Kenny Santos as Amy's boyfriend
- Toffi Santos as Bogs' boyfriend
- Anthony Ramirez as Frank Muñoz
- Julio Sampafer as Charles

== See also ==
- List of programs broadcast by ABS-CBN
- Precious Hearts Romances Presents
