= Super Inggo at ang Super Tropa =

2009 Filipino animated TV series

- Official title card
- Created by: Enrico C. Santos
- Written by: Randy Q. Villanueva; Christian Vidallo; Obet Villela; Fionna Acaba; Kayelyn Jusay; Lye Candelaria; Pear Clemente; Raymund Dimayuga; Karen Gatdula; Jeremy Legaspi
- Directed by: Enrico C. Santos
- Voices of: Makisig Morales; Jairus Aquino; Kathryn Bernardo
- Theme music composer: Teddy Corpuz
- Opening theme: "Superhero" by Rocksteddy
- Composer: Carmina Cuya
- Country of origin: Philippines
- Original language: Filipino
- No. of episodes: 14

Production
- Executive producers: Raul G. Bulaong; Yog Macan
- Editors: Hermes Tantiado Jr. Jessica Jusay
- Running time: 30 minutes

Original release
- Network: ABS-CBN
- Release: November 22, 2009 – February 21, 2010

Related
- Super Inggo; Super Inggo 1.5: Ang Bagong Bangis

Super Inggo at ang Super Tropa (English: Super Inggo and the Super Group) is a Filipino anime-inspired TV series that aired on ABS-CBN. The series, composed of 14 episodes, was broadcast from November 22, 2009 to February 21, 2010, while reruns began on May 3, 2010. It is a spin-off of the television series Super Inggo.

== Plot ==
The series tells the story of Budong, a poor boy who has a secret life as the superhero Super Inggo. Super Inggo, with his friends Ken and Teg, form the rookie superhero team, the Super Tropa. Other major characters are Budong's friends, Jomar and Maya, and Budong's mother, Pacita. Each episode, the protagonists find themselves in funny action-oriented adventures that provide life lessons by the end of the episode.

== Characters ==
- Budong / Super Inggo (voiced by Makisig Morales): Despite being poor, Budong is a happy, hyperactive and well-meaning child. He is gifted with the ability to connect with people from all walks of life. In his own way, he takes care of everyone in their small town of Sto. Niño. Budong lives with Pacita, the woman he came to know as his mother. For Pacita, Budong would give and risk everything. After having discovered powers that he had inherited from his super hero father, Super Islaw, Budong attended the super hero school, the Power Academy, and becomes Super Inggo. Together with the Mighty Ken and the Amazing Teg, Super Inggo is a member of the Super Tropa that protects the town of Sto. Nino. His powers are flight, strength, the ability to project destructive fireballs and electric bolts, a sonic shriek, and the ability to generate a small hurricane.
- Jomar (voiced by Jairus Aquino): Jomar is Budong's wacky and loyal super best friend and sidekick. He knows everything about Budong, even Budong's secret life as a superhero. He gives advice to Budong whenever he needs it and cheers him up whenever he is down. Jomar always brings out the best in Budong. Jomar and Budong are inseparable. They grew up together and share the same dream of becoming a superhero. Jomar seems to have been abandoned by his mother, who works abroad. Jomar lives with the baker, Mang Kanor, also the father of Budong's crush, Maya.
- Maya (voiced by Kathryn Bernardo): After his mother Pacita, Maya is the love of Budong's life. Budong affectionately calls Maya "Babes." Charming, cheerful, colorful and lovable, Maya gives inspiration to our rookie superhero. Maya is the daughter of Kanor, the kind neighborhood baker who takes care of Budong and Jomar's education. In exchange for Kanor sending them to school, Budong and Jomar act as Maya's bodyguards. Maya likes acting older than she actually is. She loves make-up, trinkets and all sorts of accessories to make herself more beautiful, especially for her ultimate crush, Super Inggo. What Maya doesn't know is that Budong and Super Inggo are the same person.
- Ken aka The Mighty Ken: Like Budong, Ken attended Power Academy, the school for superheroes-in-training. His alter-ego, the Mighty Ken is a member of the Super Tropa along with Super Inggo and the Amazing Teg. He is passionate with causes concerning the environment. Ken comes from a tribe of humans who can transform into animals at will. While Ken will acquire these abilities when he matures, he is currently only able to transform into a cat. In human form, he retains the speed and agility of a cat and has retractable claws.
- Teg aka The Amazing Teg: Like Budong and Ken, Teg attended Power Academy, the school for superheroes-in-training. His alter-ego, the Amazing Teg is a member of the Super Tropa along with Super Inggo and Mighty Ken. Teg has the ability to generate kinetic energy that allows him and any object he touches to bounce.
- Jack aka The Prince of Darkness/P.O.D.: Evil, petty, and nihilistic, the Prince of Darkness uses his "shadow magic" to sow discord in the town of Sto. Nino. At the beginning of the series, the Prince is entombed in the heart of Taal Volcano. Later in the series, the Prince emerges from the volcano, taking the form of a young boy named Jack.
- Pacita: Despite the fact that she is not his birth mother, Budong considers Pacita as the best mom in the whole world. Pacita serves as Budong's inspiration in becoming a superhero. It is Budong's wish to protect her from harm that made him want to become a superhero in the first place. Pacita is a caring and supportive mother to Budong. She treats Budong as if he is her real son. She also accepts Budong's destiny of becoming a superhero—but not without hesitations. Like any good mother, she constantly worries about her son's safety. Even if she is powerless, she is willing to risk her life to keep Budong away from harm.

== Episodes ==
The series was directed by Enrico C. Santos, with Randy Q. Villanueva as head writer. Obet Villela also wrote episodes 3, 4, 5 and 8, Christian Mark Vidallo also wrote episode 2, Pear Clemente wrote 3 and Fionna Acaba wrote episode 4.

No.	Title	Original release date
1	"Amusing Race"	November 22, 2009
Budong overhears Pacita saying that she has to go abroad because they have many debts to pay. To help his mother with their debts so that she doesn't have to go away, Budong and Jomar decide to enter a contest called "The Amusing Race". Unknown to the young hero, his old nemesis, The Prince of Darkness, is hatching a plan to get rid of Budong forever.
2	"Game Over"	November 29, 2009
A freak accident causes video game characters to come alive and wreak havoc upon Budong's town.
3	"Mundong Ilalim (The Underworld)"	December 6, 2009
Iris, the king of a humanoid race that lives underground, enters our world to find Pacita and make her his queen.
4	"Giyera Patani (Pea War)"	December 13, 2009
The boys are rehearsing a play about dwarves, which they hope will be more awesome than the girls' play about fairies. The competition is stiff and causes friction between the two groups, especially between Budong and Maya. Unknown to all, there is a real war going on just beneath their feet - a conflict between fairies and dwarves. Once partners in taking care of nature, these two magical races are now bitter rivals fighting over the dwindling resources in the school's backyard. When the leaders of the two groups witness Budong and Maya in their plays, they think these kids are mighty warriors. The fairies kidnap Maya and make her their commander while the dwarves convince Budong to become their general.
5	"Ang Alamat ni Suforonggi (The Legend of Suforonggi)"	December 20, 2009
Budong and his friends are invited to Mr. Katakawa's Asian restaurant, where they are told tales of Katakawa's ancestor Suforonggi. Budong accidentally awakens the magic of Suforonggi's ancient sword, transporting himself, Pacita, Maya, Jomar, and Katakawa to Suforonggi's time. Budong learns that the Chumorai intend to sacrifice his group to the twin dragons plaguing the region.
6	"Roboman Part 1"	December 27, 2009
After his last battle with Super Inggo, the Prince of Darkness is reduced to the form of a young boy and swears revenge against Inggo. Meanwhile, the corrupt Mayor Vicente is illegally transporting toxic waste in a secret dumpsite deep within the forest. That night, Jack sets into motion a series of events that would turn Mang Raymund into a monster. Through Jack's actions, Mang Raymund is bathed in toxic waste, transforming him into the mechanical Roboman. Losing his mind to his transformation, Mang is compelled to attack Vicente's house to make enough money for his daughter Grace's medical operation.
7	"Roboman Part 2"	January 3, 2010
Roboman and Super Inggo's battle reaches the plaza, where the entire town of Sto. Niño is celebrating its fiesta. Roboman reveals that he has another ace in the hole: Mayor Vicente's wife, who is about to die under a vat of flesh-eating toxic waste in Vicente's illegal dumpsite.
8	"Ani-Men"	January 10, 2010
Poachers are marauding the forest near Budong's home and it's a job for Super Inggo to stop them. Joining him is the Mighty Ken, who has a special grudge against criminals like this since he's part animal himself. The two are met by Logan, an Ani-Man with the ability to transform into animals. He reveals that Ken's power to transform into a cat comes from his ancestors, who are of Logan's tribe. Ken learns from Logan that in the future, the boy will learn to turn himself into any animal just like his brethren. Meanwhile, in the lair of the poachers deep within the forest, an evil scientific experiment is being conducted. Dr. Zoolittle, the leader of the poachers, is turning the captured animals into abominations using a mutagenic serum.
9	"Max Part 1"	January 17, 2010
A deal Max Faustino made with a magical creature called Tophel in the past threatens the safety of his daughter. In exchange for the magical guitar that made him famous, he agreed to give Tophel his daughter Angel. In the midst of preparing for a music exam, the magical guitar ends in Budong's hands and is sought by Tophel.
10	"Max Part 2"	January 24, 2010
In his search for Max, Tophel faces off with Super Inggo and the Super Troop but their combined forces are no match for the magical creature. Meanwhile, a severe substitute teacher threatens to fail the entire class in their music exam.
11	"Supah Ferwisyo"	January 31, 2010
The Super Tropa saves a small fishing ship from sinking and learns from its captain that a lot of ships have been meeting accidents lately. There is talk among the seafarers that a terrible gang of sea monsters is plaguing the ships. Super Islaw tells the kids that the coast guard will handle the case now. Meanwhile, Pacita is trying to figure out how she can pay for Budong's tuition when Super Islaw appears, saying that he and his wife Inday is settling for good in faraway Cebu and that they want Budong to live there. Pacita has no choice but to give Budong back to his true parent. Pacita's last request to Islaw is that he allow her to take the boy to Cebu herself. Pacita cannot bear to tell Budong that the boy's vacation in the island with Islaw and Inday will be a permanent one. A fortunate turn of events at the mall leads Über-host Willie Revillame to award Budong and Pacita with a free trip to Cebu aboard the Supah Ferwisyo. Jomar, Maya, and Kanor go with them. The gang meets the Super Ferwisyo's captain, Anchor, and his sailors. The trip goes well until the fearsome sea monsters attack the ship.
12	"Time Gun"	February 7, 2010
A time crystal explodes and turns the adults of the town into children while the children of the town turn into adults.
13	"Ultrakid Part 1"	February 14, 2010
Due to the events in the hunt for the Time Crystal, Jack had accidentally been restored to his form as the Prince of Darkness. Now the villain is gathering Super Inggo's deadliest enemies as the Army of Darkness. Their business is mayhem. Their purpose is revenge against the rookie superhero. Meanwhile, Super Inggo's screwup in the battle with Roboman has resulted in the injury of Ken and Teg, the damage of his home, and the ruin of his mother's birthday party. Because of this, the title of Santo Niño's Official Superhero is given to a new crime fighter: the futuristic Ultrakid. The townspeople, including Maya, turn their backs on Super Inggo. Even Jomar is about to leave Budong. Jomar's mother Malou has finally appeared to take the boy with her to Hong Kong. And to top it all off, Roboman—cured by fab cosmetic surgeon Vickie Bilao and back to being Raymund the mild-mannered electrician—seems to be getting romantically involved with Pacita, triggering intense jealousy in Budong. When Budong rushes off in anger, Raymund reveals that Vickie's cure is a sham. He is still Roboman and all this has been planned by the Prince.
14	"Ultrakid Part 2"	February 21, 2010
Budong feels that the entire world has turned against him. The people of Santo Niño, especially Maya, are hailing the futuristic crime fighter Ultrakid as the official superhero of the town. Budong's teammates Ken and Teg are in the hospital because of our hero's screw-up. Budong's best friend Jomar is leaving for Hong Kong with his long-lost mother. Budong's mother Pacita seems to be attracted to former supervillain Raymund, making the boy think he'll be losing her too. Meanwhile, the Prince of Darkness assembles the Army of Darkness, a gathering of Super Inggo's deadliest enemies.

== See also ==
- Super Inggo
- Super Inggo 1.5: Ang Bagong Bangis
