= Jairus Aquino =

Filipino actor (born 1999)

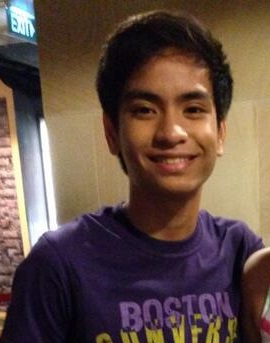
- Aquino in 2014
- Born: Jairus Reuel Balagtas Aquino; April 1, 1999 (age 27); Caloocan, Philippines
- Other names: Jai, JJ
- Education: Meridian International College
- Occupations: Actor, VJ
- Years active: 2006–present
- Agents: Star Magic (2006–2021); Viva Artists Agency (2021–present)
- Known for: Pareng Jomar in Super Inggo; Lembot in Kung Fu Kids; Drake in Luv U

Jairus Reuel Balagtas Aquino (Tagalog pronunciation: [ˈdʒaɪɾʊs aˈkino], born April 1, 1999) is a Filipino actor best known for his roles in Super Inggo, Kung Fu Kids and Luv U.

Aquino appeared in several television advertisements before his first television appearance as an actor in ABS-CBN's television series Super Inggo. The series became popular, earning him the household name "Pareng Jomar", also known as "Pambansang Bestfriend ng Pilipinas" (National Best Friend of the Philippines). Since then, he is seen in ABS-CBN's television shows and films, as part of Star Magic.

== Biography ==
=== Early life ===
Jairus Reuel Balagtas Aquino was born in Caloocan, on April 1, 1999. His family is composed of two older siblings, a girl and a boy, father and mother named Carrie.

With encouragement from friends and family support, Aquino began his career as a commercial model at the age of 7. He appeared in several advertisements both for print, media and apparel before he stopped short after his parents became concerned he was working at an early age. One of his commercial appearances for "Dolfenal Mefenamic acid" tells about a father who has a headache and his tagline was "Sabi ni Daddy na lang daw" (Tagalog, "Daddy says later").

== Career ==
=== Super Inggo series: 2006–2007 ===
In 2006, Aquino auditioned on ABS-CBN's upcoming series Super Inggo after his family's friends introduced it.

The series is about a 17-year-old boy, played by Makisig Morales, who dreamed to become a superhero. Aquino was given the role of "Jose Mariano Jomar Sebastian", a young child who grew up as a street smart witty kid raised by his "Kuya Paloy", played by Alwyn Uytingco. The series became popular, earning him the household name "Pareng Jomar", also known as "Pambansang Bestfriend ng Pilipinas" (National Best Friend of the Philippines) as his character defines a loyal brother, a loving son, and a good friend. Since then, he is seen in ABS-CBN's television shows and films, as part of Star Magic. The series boosts his popularity, which paved way for more projects.

The popularity of his tandem with Makisig Morales in Super Inggo made him a co-host for ABS-CBN's Little Big Superstar as well as his inclusion in the release of Little Big Star's debut album, Little Big Superstar. It was then followed by another album release entitled Oldies but Kiddies under Star Records, after he joined the kiddie boy band group, "Mak and the Dudes".

Following the end of the first season of the Super Inggo series, Aquino was offered to join the cast of Rounin, an ABS-CBN Philippine drama dubbed as tele-epiko or TV epic. He played the young version of "Mythos" where he trained kick boxing for two weeks in preparation for his role. He was paired with Sharlene San Pedro who played as young Selene. Mythos and Selene were the young lovers of Lumeria, who were also the main protagonist of the show. This was their first team-up in a primetime series. In addition, he appeared as a young version of "Miguel" in ABS-CBN's adaptation of Lastikman. These two were his longest cameo primetime appearances during his early career.

During the same year, he did several roles, both for film and television, before reuniting with the cast of Super Inggo's sequel Ang Bagong Bangis. He also did his first voice acting project for Super Inggo at ang Super Tropa, an animated version of the series where he voiced the character of "Jomar".

=== 2008–2010: Kung Fu Kids and other projects ===
In 2008, Aquino was given the title role in Kung Fu Kids as "Lembot/Fish Boy" following the end of Super Inggo 1.5: Ang Bagong Bangis. Aquino auditioned for ABS-CBN's upcoming television series Kung Fu Kids. According to the director, Malou Sevilla, out of the many child stars who auditioned for "Lembot", the main character of the series, Aquino fits the role the most. Soon after, he learned a couple of martial arts sequences, particularly karate, in preparation for the series. His acting was complimented by his costars in the series, agreeing that he is the best actor among the four other male child stars.

It was also the same year where he made his first afternoon television drama series Pieta which starred Ryan Agoncillo, as well as his first comedy sitcom That's My Doc with Aga Muhlach, followed by M3 (Malay Mo Ma-develop) together with Ms. Ai-Ai delas Alas in 2010.

Aquino appeared in several films playing cameo roles since his early career. His first appearance was in Star Cinema's romantic comedy film, D' Lucky Ones. He also appeared in several Metro Manila Film Festival entries such as Resiklo, Wapakman, Shake Rattle and Roll XI and Super Inday and the Golden Bibe. In addition, he had few short films including his first independent film Ang Asawa kong si Nikulet which gained a positive response, and Project Noel which was produced by Miss Earth Foundation.

His most notable film collaboration was when he voiced the character of "Bryan/Mang Ernie" in the 2010 Metro Manila Film Festival entry RPG: Metanoia. The film won 2010 Metro Manila Film Festival's 3rd Best Picture, Best Sound Recording and Best Original Theme Song, as well as being nominated in Asia Pacific Screen Awards.

=== 2011–present: Teenage years and Luv U ===
After his two years of absence in the "Primetime", Aquino once again showed his acting prowess in the ABS-CBN adaptation of Mutya in 2011 where he played the role of "Aries". It was followed by ABS-CBN drama series Kahit Puso'y Masugatan in 2012 where he played the role of Young Balong. He also appeared in Star Cinema's Way Back Home topbilled by Kathryn Bernardo and Julia Montes.

2011 is the turning point of Aquino's life as he officially turns into a teenager. He starred as Frederick Drake Lagdameo in the second season of Luv U, opposite Shirley Bernardo portrayed by Sharlene San Pedro. After teaming-up in the series, Aquino and San Pedro are given another series entitled "Si Lulu at si Lili Liit" with Francis Magundayao. It is part of the Wansapanataym series that aired one-month long starting March 1.

== Personal life ==
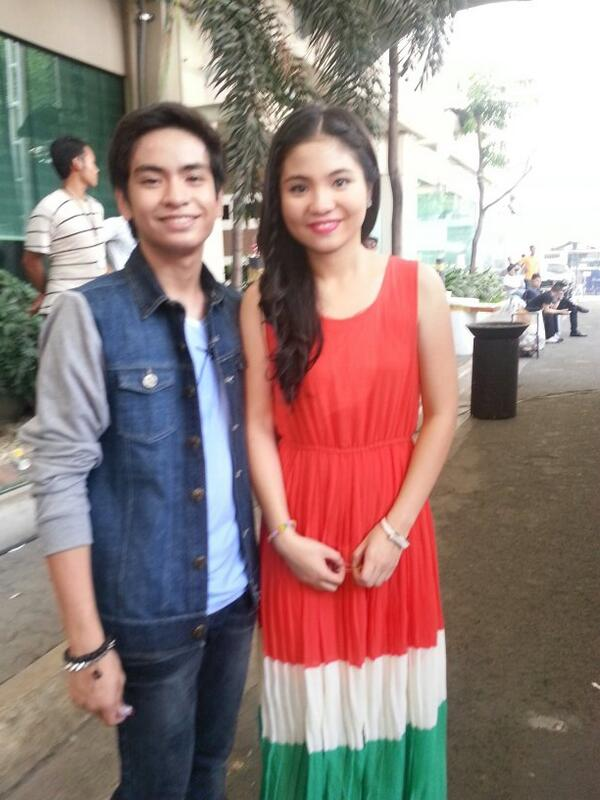
Jairus Aquino and Sharlene San Pedro, his on-screen loveteam in Luv U.

Aquino enjoys his time with his family and friends. He spends most of his time playing basketball and online games. He also allotted time visiting his Facebook and Twitter account to reach out his fans. Jairus and his family are also active members of The Church of Jesus Christ of Latter-day saints.

At age 9, Aquino already saved money from his earnings in working in the entertainment industry. As a matter of fact, he had helped his parents to have their own car, Toyota LT, which he had earned from Lastikman. He states: "Whenever I had to go somewhere else, we had to borrow my father's car. Whereas right now, I already have my own car, though it is only second-hand. (Note: Translated from the Filipino language: "Dati po kapag may lakad ako, yung kotse ng daddy ko ang ginagamit namin. Pero ngayon po nakabili na ako ng sarili kong kotse. Pero second-hand lang po yun...")

When he was cast in Pieta in 2008, he learns how to cry on set after being taught by the directors Rhayan Carlos and Gilbert Perez and Malou de Guzman. He states: "It was difficult for me to cry before that they had to tell me things before I cry. However, I discovered that drama is just as difficult as comedy because it is difficult to make the Filipinos laugh. (Note: Translated from the Filipino language: "Natuto ako umiyak. Kasi dati po ang hirap lumuha, marami pa sila sinasabi sa akin bago ako umiyak. Pero pareho lang din po sa comedy yung hirap kasi mahirap patawanin ang Pilipino.")

=== Education ===
Aquino took up a home study program at Angelicum College in order to balance his work and school. He is enrolled and studying film at Meridian International College as of 2021.

=== Public image ===
In 2014, Aquino is voted second as the "Most Promising Young Male Star" by fans, behind Nash Aguas. On March 26, Star Cinema created a poll on its website for the most promising young male star. The response from his fans is huge, having a total of 37.57% votes. The production company lists the reasons of him becoming the most promising star, which includes his good acting skills and charm, has "star quality" (talented, skilled, and being loved by people), and remarkable.

In the same year, he, along with his current on-screen partner, Sharlene San Pedro, ranked fourth in another poll for the "Hottest Love Team" by the same website. Once again, fans voted for them, which garnered 14.03% of the total votes. Their loveteam, dubbed as "JaiLene", were just behind "Kath-Niel", "Vice-Rylle" and "Kim-Xi" loveteams.

== Filmography ==
=== Film ===
| Year | Title | Character/Role | Notes |
|---|---|---|---|
| 2006 | D' Lucky Ones | Young Lucky Boy | |
| 2007 | Resiklo | Arkin | 2007 Metro Manila Film Festival entry; Nominated for Best Child Actor in the 56th FAMAS Awards |
| 2007 | Supahpapalicious | Cameo Role | |
| 2009 | Ang Asawa Kong Si Nikulet | Noknok | Short film |
| 2009 | OMG (Oh, My Girl!) | Young Biboy | |
| 2009 | Wapakman | Dingdong Meneses | 2009 Metro Manila Film Festival official entry |
| 2009 | Shake, Rattle & Roll 11 | Kuya Dave | |
| 2010 | Project Noel | Noel | Short Film |
| 2010 | White House | LJ | |
| 2010 | Super Inday and the Golden Bibe | Francis | 2010 Metro Manila Film Festival official entry |
| 2010 | RPG: Metanoia | Bryan/Mang Ernie (Voice) | 2010 Metro Manila Film Festival official entry |
| 2011 | Way Back Home | Junior Bartolome | |
| 2012 | Biyaheng Kariton Klasrom | Bogs | Independent film |
| 2012 | Born to Love You | Young Rex | |
| 2012 | Amorosa | Jun | |
| 2012 | Suddenly It's Magic | Young Marcus | |
| 2012 | Shake, Rattle and Roll Fourteen: The Invasion | Teen | |
| 2016 | Always Be My Maybe | Tintin's brother | |
| 2018 | Mary, Marry Me | Young Pete | |
| 2020 | Boyette: Not a Girl Yet | Pia | |
| 2024 | Sunny | John | |
