= Kaye Abad =

Filipino actress

- Born: Katherine Grace Cosme Abad; May 17, 1982 (age 44); Easton, Pennsylvania, U.S.
- Citizenship: Philippines; United States
- Occupations: Actress; singer
- Years active: 1993–present
- Agent: Star Magic (1993–2015; 2022–present)
- Spouse: Paul Jake Castillo (m. 2016)
- Children: 2
- Relatives: Sarah Jane Abad (sister)

Katherine Grace "Kaye" Cosme Abad-Castillo (born May 17, 1982) is a Filipino actress.

Abad started her career in 1993 and is a member of ABS-CBN's Star Magic. She was launched as a member of Star Circle (now Star Magic Batch 3) in 1996.

== Career ==
Kaye Abad started in 1993 in the Philippine entertainment industry, and was cast in the youth-oriented show Ang TV. She also starred in numerous teen-oriented films and TV series, notably paired with John Lloyd Cruz. The tandem of Cruz and Abad is best remembered in the television series Tabing Ilog which ran from 1999 to 2003.

In 2006, Abad played Cynthia in the prequel fanta-serye Super Inggo opposite Makisig Morales, followed by its sequel in 2007 Super Inggo 1.5: Ang Bagong Bangis.

In 2009, Abad returned to television via Precious Hearts Romances Presents: Bud Brothers Series. She took over the role originally intended for Roxanne Guinoo, who was supposed to play the lead role opposite Guji Lorenzana.

In 2010, she played her first antagonist role in the drama romantic series Precious Hearts Romances: Alyna as Lilet Cenarosa-del Carmen.

Lorenzana and Abad were given the lead roles in the third installment of the Precious Hearts Romances series. Abad played a supporting role as Jenny Ambrosio in Angelito: Batang Ama and its sequel Angelito: Ang Bagong Yugto on its weekday afternoon program.

Abad appeared on the cover of FHM Philippines' June 2012 issue.

In 2013, she played an antagonist role in the family drama series Annaliza as Stella Celerez-Diaz and in 2014, Abad appeared on Two Wives as Yvonne Aguilluz-Guevarra.

In 2019, she played Ella in Nang Ngumiti ang Langit, marking her comeback to showbiz.

In 2025, after the pandemic, she made a comeback through a movie entitled ConMom that was an original movie of Netflix.

== Personal life ==
Abad's family hails from Cavite. Actress Sarah Jane Abad is her sister.

She became the ambassador of Manila International Airport Authority, the government agency for Ninoy Aquino International Airport, since February 13, 2008.

Abad previously had relationships with actor John Lloyd Cruz, band vocalist Chito Miranda, and singer Guji Lorenzana.

Abad met Paul Jake Castillo during the production of Precious Hearts Romances Presents: Alyna (2010–11). He is a businessman known for being the runner-up of the reality show Pinoy Big Brother: Double Up (2009–10). Abad and Castillo began their relationship in 2014. They became engaged in May 2016, with the latter proposing on the former's 34th birthday. They married on December 9, 2016 at a ceremony in Castillo's hometown, Cebu City. Their first son was born in 2017 while their second son was born in 2021.

In 2025, Abad was diagnosed with breast cancer. After a year of treatment in Singapore, she was declared cancer-free.

== Filmography ==
=== Television ===
| Year | Title | Role | Notes | Ref(s): |
|---|---|---|---|---|
| 1992–1997 | Ang TV | Herself | | |
| 1995 | Kaybol: Ang Bagong TV | Kat-Kat | | |
| 1995–2018 | ASAP | Herself – Host / Performer | | |
| 1996–1999 | Gimik | Kakai Marquez | | |
| 1997–1999 | Mula sa Puso | Glenda Corpuz | | |
| 1997 | !Oka Tokat | Elena | Episode: "Telekinesis" | |
| 1998 | Maalaala Mo Kaya | Ningning | Episode: "Aklat" | |
| 1998 | Maalaala Mo Kaya | Teresa | Episode: "Kinky Hair" | |
| 1998–1999 | Sa Sandaling Kailangan Mo Ako | Eloisa | | |
| 1999 | Hiraya Manawari | Margarita | Episode: "Si Benjamin at ang Palaka" | |
| 1999–2002 | G-mik | Kakai Marquez | | |
| 1999–2003 | Tabing Ilog | Epifania "Eds" delos Santos-Mercado | | |
| 2000 | Maalaala Mo Kaya | Tin-tin | Episode: "Burger Joint" | |
| 2001 | Wansapanataym | Ruth | Episode: "Si Louie, Si Luisa" | |
| 2001 | Maalaala Mo Kaya | Nanette | Episode: "Banyo" | |
| 2002 | Sa Dulo ng Walang Hanggan | Sophia Bustamante Ilagan | | |
| 2002 | Maalaala Mo Kaya | Bernadette | Episode: "Suman at Ketchup" | |
| 2003 | Maalaala Mo Kaya | Carol Banawa | Episode: "Mikropono" | |
| 2003 | Maalaala Mo Kaya | Roxanne | Episode: "Pawikan" | |
| 2003–2004 | Sana'y Wala Nang Wakas | Shane Diwata | | |
| 2004 | Tara Tena: Steps to the Heart | Marla | | |
| 2004 | Wansapanataym | Monique | Episode: "Mic ni Monique" | |
| 2005 | Maalaala Mo Kaya | Ilang | Episode: "Bestida" | |
| 2006–2007 | Super Inggo | Cynthia | | |
| 2007 | Maalaala Mo Kaya | Patty | Episode: "Blue Rose" | |
| 2007 | Super Inggo 1.5: Ang Bagong Bangis | Cynthia | | |
| 2009 | May Bukas Pa | Minerva | | |
| 2009 | Precious Hearts Romances: Bud Brothers Series: Pepper's Roses | Peppermint "Pepper" Nuque | | |
| 2009 | Precious Hearts Romances: Somewhere in My Heart | Eufemia "Femi" Dalisay | | |
| 2010 | Rubi | Princess Rodrigo / Cristina Perez | | |
| 2010–2011 | Precious Hearts Romances: Alyna | Lilet Cenarosa-Del Carmen | Main Cast | |
| 2011–2012 | Angelito: Batang Ama | Jenny Ambrosio | Lead Cast | |
| 2012 | Lorenzo's Time | Young Mildred Montereal-Gamboa | | |
| 2012 | Angelito: Ang Bagong Yugto | Jenny Ambrosio-Abella | Lead Cast | |
| 2013 | Maalaala Mo Kaya | Leni Robredo | Episode: "Tsinelas" | |
| 2013–2014 | Annaliza | Stella Celerez-Querubin / Stella Celerez-Diaz | Lead Cast / Antagonist | |
| 2014–2015 | Two Wives | Yvonne Aguiluz-Guevarra / Yvonne Aguiluz-Medrano | Lead Cast | |
| 2019 | Nang Ngumiti ang Langit | Ella Dimaano-Salvador | Special Participation | |
| 2022–present | ASAP Natin 'To | Herself | | |
| 2023 | Happy Together | Rose | Guest Cast | |

=== Film ===
| Year | Title | Role | Notes | Ref(s): |
|---|---|---|---|---|
| 1996 | Ang TV: The Movie | | | |
| 1997 | Flames: The Movie: Tameme | Jenny | | |
| 1998 | Nagbibinata | Mae | | |
| 1999 | Oo Na, Mahal Na Kung Mahal | Miles | Main cast | |
| 2001 | Mila | Winona | | |
| 2002 | Batas ng Lansangan | Marissa | | |
| 2002 | Kung Ikaw Ay Isang Panaginip | Peachy | | |
| 2003 | Ang Tanging Ina | Jenny | | |
| 2009 | Iliw | Fidela | | |
| 2010 | My Amnesia Girl | The Teacher | Cameo appearance | |
| 2010 | Ang Tanging Ina Mo (Last na 'To!) | Jenny | Supporting cast | |
| 2011 | Unplugged | Isabel | | |
| 2012 | 24/7 in Love | Housekeeping Lady | Cameo appearance | |
| 2015 | The Bet | | | |
| 2015 | The Comeback | Isabel | | |
| 2024 | A Journey | Shane | | |

== Awards and nominations ==
| Year | Work | Award | Category | Result | Source |
|---|---|---|---|---|---|
| 1998 | Maalaala Mo Kaya: "Aklat" | Asian Television Award 1998 | Best Actress | Nominated | |
| 2014 | Annaliza | Yahoo! Celebrity Awards | Female Kontrabida of the Year | Nominated | |
| 2015 | Maalaala Mo Kaya: "Hat" | PMPC Star Awards for Television | Best Single Performance by an Actress | Nominated | |
