= Letty Alonzo =

Filipina film actress (1929–2020)

- Born: Blanca Leticia Arrastia y Johnson; 28 January 1929; Lubao, Pampanga, The Philippine Islands, U.S.
- Died: 2020 (aged 90–91); Philippines
- Occupation: Actress
- Years active: 1951–1953
- Spouse: Mario Montenegro (m. 1952; died 1988)
- Children: Honeylet Montenegro
- Relatives: Valeen Montenegro (granddaughter); Isabel Preysler (first-cousin-once-removed/niece)

Blanca Leticia Arrastia y Johnson (28 January 1929 – 2020), better known as Letty Alonzo, was a Filipina actress from LVN Pictures who was typecast as a villain. She starred in a few films before leaving the entertainment industry after her marriage to fellow LVN actor, Mario Montenegro.

== Biography ==
Alonzo was born on 28 January 1929. She was married to another famous LVN co-star, Mario Montenegro. They became the grandparents to actress Valeen Montenegro through her daughter, beauty queen Honeylet, who married footballer Iñaki Vicente. She died in 2020.

== Filmography ==
- 1951 - Bohemyo
- 1952 - Rodrigo De Villa
- 1952 - Squatters
- 1953 - Senorito
- 1953 - 3 Labuyo
- 1953 - Batanguena
