= HushHush =

- Genre: Teen drama
- Created by: Pixelgrain, Inc. and MPB Primedia, Inc.
- Directed by: Laurice Guillen
- Starring: Bernard Palanca; Dominic Ochoa; Valeen Montenegro; Joem Bascon; Krista Ranillo; Joseph Bitangcol; Bruno Folster; Ina Feleo; Ana Feleo
- Country of origin: Philippines
- Original language: Filipino
- No. of episodes: 13

Production
- Camera setup: Multi-camera setup
- Running time: 1 hour

Original release
- Network: TV5
- Release: August 27 – November 19, 2008

HushHush is a Philippine teen drama series broadcast by TV5. Directed by Laurice Guillen, it stars Bernard Palanca, Dominic Ochoa, Valeen Montenegro, Joem Bascon, Krista Ranillo, Joseph Bitangcol, Bruno Folster, Ina Feleo and Ana Feleo. It aired from August 27 to November 19, 2008, replacing PBA on ABC.

== Plot ==
HushHush revolves around the lives of wanna-be celebrities as they break into the world of showbiz.

== Cast ==
- Bernard Palanca
- Dominic Ochoa as Toby
- Joem Bascon as Andy
- Valeen Montenegro as Roxy
- Krista Ranillo as Kate
- Joseph Bitangcol
- Bruno Folster as Jinno
- Ina Feleo as Sarah
- Ana Feleo

== See also ==
- List of TV5 (Philippine TV network) original programming
