= Gilbert Perez =

- Born: Gilbert Roland Guevara Perez; December 29, 1959; Valenzuela City
- Died: July 16, 2008 (aged 48); Quezon City
- Other names: Gibo, GP
- Occupation: Film-television director
- Known for: Manong Gilbert

Gilbert Roland Guevara Perez (December 29, 1959 – July 16, 2008) was a Filipino film-television director from ABS-CBN.

== Filmography ==
=== TV director ===
- Maalaala Mo Kaya (3 episodes, 1999–2000)
  - Tulay (2000) TV episode (series director)
  - Pulot-Gata (1999) TV episode (series director)
  - Siato (1999) TV episode (series director)
- Arriba, Arriba! (2000)
- Sa Puso Ko, Iingatan Ka (2001–2003)
- Berks (2002–2004)
- It Might Be You (2003–2004)
- Bituing Walang Ningning (2006)
- Super Inggo (2006–2007)
- Star Magic Presents (1 episode, 2006)
  - Tender Loving Care (2006) TV episode
- Super Inggo 1.5: Ang Bagong Bangis (2007)
- Maging Sino Ka Man: Ang Pagbabalik (2007)
- Sineserye Presents (2 episodes: 2007–2008)
  - Patayin sa Sindak si Barbara (2008) TV episode
  - May Minamahal (2007) TV episode
- Kahit Isang Saglit (2008)

=== Movie director ===
- Kahit Isang Saglit (2000)
- Trip (2001)
- Jologs (2002)
- Dreamboy (2005)
- You Got Me! (2006) 2nd Unit Director
- Supahpapalicious (2008)
