= Super Islaw =

Publication information
- Publisher: Regal Entertainment; ABS-CBN
- First appearance: Super Islaw and The Flying Kids (1986)
- Created by: J. Erastheo Navoa

In-story information
- Alter ego: Islaw
- Species: Human with Mystical Powers
- Team affiliations: Power Academy Team (Super Inggo; Isang Lakas Beta Team
- Notable aliases: Islaw
- Abilities: Flight, Superstrength

Super Islaw is a fictional Filipino superhero created by J. Erastheo Navoa who appeared in some movies and TV Series. He was portrayed by Richard Gomez in the movie Super Islaw and The Flying Kids and was later revived by Zanjoe Marudo in ABS-CBN's Super Inggo TV series.

== Super Islaw and The Flying Kids ==
Super Islaw and The Flying Kids
- Directed by: J. Erastheo Navoa
- Screenplay by: Jose Carreon
- Story by: J. Erastheo Navoa
- Produced by: Lily Y. Monteverde; Charo Santos-Concio; Malou N. Santos
- Starring: Richard Gomez
- Cinematography: Bhal Dauz
- Edited by: Efren Jarlego
- Music by: Willy Cruz
- Production company: Regal Films
- Release date: July 17, 1986
- Country: Philippines
- Language: Filipino

=== Synopsis ===
Super Islaw was a young disabled boy who was granted mystical powers because of his good heart. He used these abilities to protect the innocents of his town, battling supernatural beings such as vampires.

=== Cast and characters ===
- Richard Gomez as Islaw/Super Islaw
- Janice de Belen as Juanita
- Nadia Montenegro as Adiang
- Kristina Paner as Tinang
- Dranreb Belleza as Andoy
- Anjo Yllana as Perry
- George Estregan as Lucan
- Lito Anzures as Ermitanyo/San Gabriel
- Bomber Moran as Kapitan Berong
- Jaime Fabregas as Padre Jaime
- Palito as Pepe
- Rudy Meyer as Hepe
- Mely Tagasa as Lola Cuna
- Joe Jardi as Bandit
- Tom Olivar as Hostage taker

== In Super Inggo ==
- Super Islaw also appeared in ABS-CBN's TV series Super Inggo portrayed by Zanjoe Marudo. In this series, Super Islaw has a son named Super Inggo from his villain wife. The series also features Super Inday as his fiancée.
