= Pieta (TV series) =

- Title Card
- Genre: Action; Drama
- Created by: ABS-CBN Studios; Gina Marissa Tagasa; Carlo J. Caparas
- Based on: Pieta (1983 film) by Carlo J. Caparas
- Developed by: ABS-CBN Studios; Enrico C. Santos
- Written by: Agnes De Guzman; Willy Laconsay
- Directed by: Toto Natividad; Don M. Cuaresma
- Starring: Cherie Gil; Ryan Agoncillo; Nikki Gil; Krista Ranillo; Jestoni Alarcon; John Regala
- Opening theme: "Kapalaran" by Ciara Sotto
- Country of origin: Philippines
- Original language: Filipino
- No. of episodes: 133

Production
- Executive producers: Carlo Katigbak; Cory Vidanes; Laurenti Dyogi; Roldeo Endrinal; Enrico Santos
- Producer: Ellen Rodriguez
- Running time: 30-45 minutes
- Production company: Dreamscape Entertainment Television

Original release
- Network: ABS-CBN
- Release: October 27, 2008 – May 1, 2009

Pieta is a Philippine television drama series broadcast by ABS-CBN. Based on a 1983 Philippine film of the same title. Directed by Toto Natividad and Don M. Cuaresma, it stars Cherie Gil, Ryan Agoncillo, Nikki Gil, Krista Ranillo, Jestoni Alarcon and John Regala. It aired on the network's Hapontastic line up and worldwide on TFC from October 27, 2008 to May 1, 2009, replacing Ligaw na Bulaklak and was replaced by Precious Hearts Romances Presents: Bud Brothers.

The series is currently airing online on Jeepney TV's YouTube Channel at a timeslot of 8:00 PM, replacing Vietnam Rose.

== Synopsis ==
Pieta tells the story of Amanda and her son Rigor. Once she discovers that she is pregnant, Amanda struggles to build a better future for her child.

When her son Rigor commits a crime at a young age, Amanda decides to protect him by taking the fall. While she spends many years in prison, Rigor is slowly dragged into a life of violence. Amanda returns home after being released only to see her son turn into her worst nightmare.

== Cast and characters ==
=== Main Cast ===
- Cherie Gil as Amanda Tupaz
- Ryan Agoncillo as Rigor Tupaz
- Nikki Gil as Guia V. Angeles
- Krista Ranillo as Martha
- John Regala as Miguel Alcona
- Jestoni Alarcon as Delfin Torres

=== Supporting Cast ===
- Assunta De Rossi as Sabrina
- Jason Abalos as Efren Vargas
- Erich Gonzales as Ella
- Janus del Prado as Boyong
- Jairus Aquino as Toto
- Niña Dolino as Jessa Vargas
- John James Uy as Frank
- Neil Ryan Sese as Geron
- Sharlene San Pedro as Kakai
- DJ Durano as Kabo
- Lyka Ugarte as Helga

=== Guest Cast ===
- Alessandra De Rossi as Young Amanda
- Joross Gamboa as Young Delfin
- Baron Geisler as Young Miguel
- Gemmae Custodio as Young Martha
- Nikki Bagaporo as Young Jessa
- Andrew Muhlach as Young Efren
- Paul Salas as Young Rigor
- Steven Fermo as Young Boyong
- Fred Payawan as Young Geron
- Tanya Gomez as Irma
- Vice Ganda as Tita Ganda
- Crispin Pineda as Mang Tomas
- Enrique Gil as Harold
- Jeffrey Santos as Jake
- Lance Raymundo as Turko
- Mon Confiado as Lucas
- Michael Conan as Exis
- Evangeline Pascual as Lilia
- Charles Christianson as Tony Boag
- Lauren Novero as Toro
- Dante Javier as the Barangay Chairman
- Ynez Veneracion as Isidra "Ising" Calingasan
- Vice Ganda as Tita Ganda
- Eda Nolan as Young Ising
- Jacq Yu as Kai

== Reruns ==
The series firstly rerun on Jeepney TV from January 9 to September 24, 2016; at the second time on September 19 to December 16, 2022; and at the third time on April 14 to July 18, 2025, at the same Kapamilya Online Live rerun this series for the first time.

The series is currently has its rerun online on Jeepney TV's Official YouTube Channel started at November 4, 2026 at a timeslot of 8:00 PM, replacing Vietnam Rose.

== See also ==
- List of programs broadcast by ABS-CBN
- List of ABS-CBN Studios original drama series
- List of programs broadcast by Jeepney TV
