= Valeen Montenegro =

Filipino actress (born 1990)

- Born: Valeen Margarita Vicente; June 10, 1990 (age 36)
- Citizenship: Spain, Philippines
- Education: De La Salle–College of Saint Benilde
- Occupations: Actress; comedian; model
- Years active: 2006–present
- Agents: Star Magic (2006–2008); Star Worx (2008–2015, 2026–present); GMA Artist Center (2015–2019); VEDA Productions (2019–present)
- Spouse: Riel Manuel (m. 2024)
- Children: 1
- Parent: Iñaki Vicente (father)
- Relatives: Mario Montenegro (grandfather); Letty Alonzo (grandmother)

Valeen Vicente de Manuel (born June 10, 1990) is a Filipino actress, comedian and model.

== Career ==
Montenegro started her acting career as one of the new talents launched by ABS-CBN's talent management arm Star Magic in 2006. Her first acting role was in a one-episode stint in the comedy fantasy series Da Adventures of Pedro Penduko, playing a younger version of Gloria Romero's character Maria.

In 2007, Montenegro appeared in Ysabella and played a ghost in her first feature film Hide and Seek.

In 2008, she transferred as a non-exclusive talent in the Kapatid Network and was seen on TV5's teen drama series HushHush and sketch comedy show Lokomoko.

In 2015, she moved to GMA-7 after signing an exclusive contract and usually plays either villain or comedic roles in many of the network's teleseryes and is regularly seen in Bubble Gang.

Montenegro appeared on the cover of the July 2015 issue of FHM Philippines. She appeared again on the cover of the magazine's November 2017 issue, this time with her Bubble Gang co-stars Kim Domingo, Chariz Solomon, Jackie Rice, Denise Barbacena, Arra San Agustin, Lovely Abella and Arny Ross.

== Personal life ==
Montenegro is the granddaughter of actors Mario Montenegro and Letty Alonzo. Her father, Iñaki Vicente, was a footballer for the Philippine national team.

Montenegro obtained her degree in fashion design and merchandising from De La Salle-College of Saint Benilde in 2013.

In 2024, she married cinematographer Riel Manuel. Their first child, a son, was born in November 2025.

== Filmography ==
=== Film ===
Year	Title	Role	Notes	Ref.
2007	Hide and Seek	Ella Cabuena		
2009	Nandito Ako Nagmamahal Sa'Yo	Rubylyn Alba		
2015	My Bebe Love: #KiligPaMore	Cielo		
2016	Every Room is a Planet	Yannie		
2017	Mang Kepweng Returns	Rachelle		
2017	The Write Moment	Joyce		

=== Television ===
Year	Title	Role	Notes	Ref.
2006	Komiks Presents: Da Adventures of Pedro Penduko	young Maria		
2006	Crazy for You	Luna		
2006	Your Song Presents: Half Crazy			
2006	Star Magic Presents: Abt Ur Luv	Gwen		
2007	Star Magic Presents: Abt Ur Luv Ur Lyf 2	Gwen		
2007	Ysabella	Lima Amarillo		
2007	Maalaala Mo Kaya	Camille's sister	Episode: "Barko"	
2008	Star Magic Presents: Astigs in Luvin' Lyf	Ella		
2008	Your Song Presents: Kapag Ako Ay Nagmahal	Mao		
2008	Maalaala Mo Kaya	Sara	Episode: "Hair Clip"	
2008	HushHush	Roxy		
2008–2009	Lokomoko	Herself (various roles)		
2009	Your Song Presents: Underage	Ana Marie Zuriaga		
2009–2010	Lokomoko High	Herself		
2010	My Darling Aswang			
2010	Hapi Together	Elizabeth		
2010–2013	Lokomoko U	Herself (various roles)		
2010	Pidol's Wonderland	Alicia		
2010–2011	P.O.5	Herself (host)		
2011	Midnight DJ	Becky	Episode: "Atake ng Kapre"	
2012	The Jose and Wally Show Starring Vic Sotto	Ashley Villanueva		
2012	Kapitan Awesome	Georgina		
2012	Artista Academy	Herself (host)		
2013	Jeepney Jackpot: Pera o Para!	Herself (host)		
2013	Tropa Mo Ko Unli	Herself		
2015	No Harm, No Foul	Didi		
2015	Happy Truck ng Bayan	Herself (host)		
2015–2019	Sunday PinaSaya	Herself (various roles)		
2015–2023	Bubble Gang	Herself (various roles)		
2015	Princess in the Palace	Gwen Dizon		
2016	Juan Tamad	Mayumi		
2016	Poor Señorita	Piper Villon		
2016	Karelasyon	Marita	Episode: "Kulam"	
2016	Dear Uge	Anne	Episode: "Face Your Problem"	
2016	Tsuperhero	Jennifer		
2016	Karelasyon	Bela	Episode: "Kasunduan"	
2017	Dear Uge	Jenny	Episode: "User-friendly"	
2017	Encantadia	Bathalumang Haliya		
2017–2018	My Korean Jagiya	Cindy / Cinnamon	Supporting cast / antagonist	
2018	Sherlock Jr.	Mylene / Audrey Velasco		
2018	Pepito Manaloto	Valeen		
2018	My Special Tatay	young Via		
2019–2020	Beautiful Justice	Miranda "Lady M" Samonte / Red Lotus	Supporting cast / antagonist	
2021	Anak ni Waray vs. Anak ni Biday	Galatea		
2021	To Have & to Hold	Sofia Carlos		
2022	Running Man Philippines	Herself (guest)		
2024	Love. Die. Repeat.	Chloe Exekiel	Supporting cast / main antagonist	
