= A Journey (film) =

2024 Philippine drama film

- Promotional release poster
- Directed by: RC Delos Reyes
- Screenplay by: Rona Lean Sales
- Story by: Erwin Blanco; Rona Lean Sales
- Produced by: Paolo Contis
- Starring: Paolo Contis; Kaye Abad; Patrick Garcia
- Cinematography: Tom Redoble
- Edited by: Noah Tonga
- Music by: Jessie Lasaten
- Production companies: Filmotion Productions; Mavx Productions
- Distributed by: Netflix
- Release date: April 12, 2024
- Running time: 115 minutes
- Country: Philippines
- Languages: Filipino; English

A Journey is a 2024 Philippine drama film directed by RC Delos Reyes from a story and screenplay written by Rona Lean Sales, with Erwin Blanco co-wrote the former. It stars Paolo Contis, Kaye Abad and Patrick Garcia in their comeback movie. The film features one of the Philippines' iconic rivers, located in Pagsanjan, Laguna, where Paolo, Kaye, Patrick and Desiree shot their television teen drama series Tabing Ilog.

== Cast ==
- Paolo Contis as Bryan
- Kaye Abad as Shane
- Patrick Garcia as Kristoffer/Tupe
- Jimmy Santos as Mr. T
- Ogie Alcasid as Himself
- Desiree del Valle as Juana Korrinne
- Malou Crisologo as Anna
- Ogie Diaz as Showbiz Reporter
- Loi Villarama as Showbiz Reporter
- Ava Mendez as Star Gomez
- Marty Marcelo as Tupe's Manager
- Emir Delos Santos as Josh
- Allan Villafuerte as Businessman
- Shailien Militante as Young Shane
- Enzo Osorio as Young Bryan
- Jeremiah Cruz as Young Tupe
- Althea Cuestas as Highschool Jane
- Peter Von Llona as Highschool Bryan

== Production ==
The film was announced by Mavx Productions in April 2023.

The production along with Paolo Contis, Kaye Abad, Patrick Garcia and Jimmy Santos started filming in Penguin, Tasmania, Australia on July 15, 2023. They also shot in Pantabangan, Nueva Ecija, Quezon City and Pagsanjan, Laguna.

== Soundtrack ==
A Journey: Motion Picture Official Soundtrack

Soundtrack album by Vanessa Garcia
- Released: April 5, 2024
- Recorded: 2024
- Length: 3:16
- Label: Mavx Productions

- The official soundtrack was released on April 5, 2024, and can be stream on Spotify and Apple Music.

== Release ==
The film was released worldwide in Netflix on April 12, 2024.

== Reception ==
The movie received a score of 67 out 100 from 12 reviews according to review aggregator website Kritikultura, indicating generally positive reviews.

Goldwin Reviews gave the film a rating of 4 out of 5 rating and said, Regardless of the ending, it's still the journey that counts—and this film made us feel its worth.

Suvo Pyne of High on Films gave the film 3½ stars out of 5 stars and wrote: A Journey takes some bold decisions and makes its entire story mean something else. It gives death the fearful respect it deserves. For this alone, A Journey should deserve some praise.

Lori Meek of Ready Steady Cut gave the film a rating of 3 over 5 rating and said: a movie doesn't need to have a never-before-seen synopsis to be good. And that's precisely what A Journey is. It's a touching story about three childhood friends finding meaning in their lives in the face of devastating adversity.

=== Accolades ===
Accolades received by A Journey
Award	Date of ceremony	Category	Recipient(s)	Result	Ref.
41st Star Awards for Movies	November 30, 2025	Indie Movie of the Year	A Journey	Pending	
41st Star Awards for Movies	November 30, 2025	Indie Movie Director of the Year	RC Delos Reyes	Pending	
41st Star Awards for Movies	November 30, 2025	Indie Movie Ensemble Acting of the Year	A Journey	Pending	
41st Star Awards for Movies	November 30, 2025	Indie Movie Cinematographer of the Year	Tom Redoble	Pending	
41st Star Awards for Movies	November 30, 2025	Indie Movie Musical Scorer of the Year	Jessie Lasaten	Pending	
