= Guji Lorenzana =

Filipino-American actor, singer and music executive

- Lorenzana in 2026
- Born: Gregory Lorenzana Jr. May 11, 1980 (age 46); Long Beach, California, U.S.
- Education: University of California, Davis
- Occupations: Actor; singer; music executive
- Years active: 2005–present
- Spouse: Cheska Nolasco (m. 2016)
- Children: 2
- Website: gujilorenzana.com

Guji Lorenzana (born May 11, 1980) is a Filipino-American actor, singer and music executive. He is the director of A&R and client development for the Asia-Pacific region at Symphonic Distribution.

He began releasing music before entering Philippine television and has performed in musical theatre. He has also worked in radio, artist management and digital music distribution.

== Early life ==
Lorenzana studied rhetoric and communication at the University of California, Davis, with additional training in theatre arts.

Before entering the Philippine entertainment industry, Lorenzana auditioned for the third season of American Idol. Although he did not advance in the competition, he continued pursuing a recording career, releasing Five Days More in the United States in 2005. He moved to the Philippines in 2006, releasing a self-titled recording that year and the album Without Your Love in 2007 before joining Star Magic in 2008.

== Career ==
=== Music and broadcasting ===
Lorenzana hosted The Weekend Chill on Mellow 94.7. He later co-hosted episodes of the podcast Good Times with Mo and worked as a resident DJ at Cove Manila.

In 2013, Lorenzana competed in the first season of The Voice of the Philippines alongside his sister Grace. Performing as the Lorenzana Siblings, the duo joined Apl.de.ap's team following their blind audition and were eliminated during the battle rounds against Tristhan Perfecto.

He was a member of Voizboys alongside Nico Antonio, Jay-R Siaboc and Tom Rodriguez. The group released Fusion in 2010 through Quantum Music, distributed by Star Records.

==== TFTI ====
Lorenzana performed with RJ dela Fuente and Janjay Coquilla in the vocal trio TFTI. The group released a cover of SWV's "Weak" in 2017, followed by "Forevermore" and "O Holy Night" in 2019.

In 2026, the three singers were credited on the recording "In Christ Alone".

=== Acting and theatre ===
His early television appearances included I Love Betty la Fea and Midnight DJ. In 2009, he played Rei opposite Kaye Abad as Pepper in "Pepper's Roses", part of Precious Hearts Romances Presents: The Bud Brothers. The two were subsequently paired in Somewhere in My Heart, with their screen partnership becoming known to fans as "KayJi".

His stage work has included West Side Story, Tales of the Manuvu, Legally Blonde, Grease and Rent.

In 2026, Lorenzana appeared in Love, Siargao and A Mother's Sacrifice. He also starred opposite Krissha Viaje as David in The CEO's New Jowa, a vertical drama series produced by Studio Viva in partnership with HONOR Philippines.

=== Music industry career ===
In 2017, Lorenzana co-founded the artist management company Open Door Artists. In 2021, he became country manager for the Philippines at Ingrooves Music Group. He subsequently worked with Virgin Music Group, including its expansion into Thailand.

He joined Symphonic Distribution in June 2024 as its first territory manager for Asia, with responsibility for artist recruitment and business partnerships.

In February 2026, Symphonic announced his promotion to director of A&R and client development, APAC. His responsibilities covered regional A&R strategy, client development and team growth across Southeast Asia, East Asia, South Asia and Australia.

In an October 2026 profile, BusinessMirror discussed his work with independent music and the distribution of Mariah Deborah's “Na Para Bang” through Symphonic and Nine Degrees North. Lorenzana credited the artist and her label's existing audience development, including their work on YouTube. The song reached number one on the Billboard Philippines Hot 100, holding the position for a second week on the chart dated October 17, 2026.

==== Conferences and speaking ====
Lorenzana has participated in international music industry conferences, including Indie-Con Australia in 2025 and South by Southwest (SXSW) in Austin and All That Matters in Singapore in 2026. His appearances have focused on independent music distribution, artist development and opportunities in the Asia-Pacific music market.

== Other activities ==
=== Cancer awareness campaign ===
In 2018, Lorenzana released the song "Be Alright", which he wrote during his mother's treatment for cervical cancer. Following her death, he dedicated the song and its accompanying music video to her memory, using the project to raise cancer awareness.

He subsequently established the Be Alright Campaign and supported efforts to increase Filipino participation in bone marrow donor registries, including initiatives associated with Be The Match and the Asian American Donor Program. In 2019, the campaign also collaborated on a fundraising concert for a cancer patient in the Philippines.

=== YouTube content creation ===
In 2021, Lorenzana was selected as one of 12 winners of YouTube NextUp Philippines, a program supporting emerging content creators. He participated in the program's online Creator Camp, receiving training in video production and audience development. His YouTube content has featured music performances, family life, and personal experiences.

== Personal life ==
Lorenzana married interior designer Cheska Nolasco in February 2016. In a 2023 interview, he said they had met through Tinder and began their relationship in 2014.

Their daughter Cassidy Lorenzana made her professional theatre debut as one of the children alternating as Tam in the Manila engagement of the 2024 Asian tour of Miss Saigon.

Lorenzana was previously in a relationship with actress Kaye Abad. In March 2014, Abad publicly confirmed that their three-year relationship had ended.

== Theatre ==
Year	Production	Role	Theatre company	References
2008	West Side Story	Snowboy	STAGES	
2009	Believe			
2009	Tales of the Manuvu	Oggasi	Ballet Philippines	
2010	Legally Blonde	Warner Huntington III	Atlantis Productions	
2014	Grease	Danny Zuko	9 Works Theatrical	
2024	Rent	Mr. Johnson; Benjamin “Benny” Coffin III (alternate)	9 Works Theatrical	

== Filmography ==
=== Film ===
Year	Title	Role	Production companies	References
2010	Paano na Kaya	Louie	Star Cinema	
2010	Babe, I Love You	Jet	Star Cinema	
2010	Till My Heartaches End	John	Star Cinema	
2010	Dalaw	Anton's friend	Star Cinema	
2011	Segunda Mano	Friend of Ivan	Star Cinema; AgostoDos Pictures; MJM Productions	
2012	Guni-Guni	Javier	Regal Films	
2012	Suddenly It’s Magic	Marvin	Star Cinema	
2012	24/7 in Love	Stefan	Star Cinema	
2013	It Takes a Man and a Woman	Carlo	Star Cinema; Viva Films	
2013	She’s the One	Mike	Star Cinema	
2014	Bitukang Manok		Cinema One Originals	
2015	Filemon Mamon	Supervisor	Megavision	
2015	Silong	Gilbert	SQ Film Laboratories; Black Maria Pictures	
2015	Just the Way You Are	Professor Parker	Star Cinema	
2018	Squad Goals	Sir Mandy Daluyong	Viva Films	
2019	Maria	Bert	Viva Films; BlackOps Studios Asia; PsyOps8	
2021	Steal	Tanaka	Viva Films	
2021	Nerisa	Tiniente Arthur	Viva Films	
2021	A Hard Day		Viva Films	
2022	Ikaw Lang ang Mahal	Earl	Viva Films	
2023	Nightbird		Viva Films	
2024	Dearly Beloved	Supervisor Jonah	Viva Films; Halcyon Productions	
2025	In Between	Albert	Viva Films; Studio Viva	
2026	A Mother’s Sacrifice			

=== Television and streaming ===
Year	Title	Role	Network / platform	References
2008	I Love Betty la Fea		ABS-CBN	
2009	Midnight DJ		TV5	
2009	The Bud Brothers	Reynaldo “Rei” Arambulo	ABS-CBN	
2009	Your Song Presents: Someone to Love	Troy	ABS-CBN	
2009	Somewhere in My Heart	Aaron Gorospe	ABS-CBN	
2009–2010	ASAP	Performer	ABS-CBN	
2010	Your Song Presents: My Last Romance	Raul	ABS-CBN	
2010	Magkano ang Iyong Dangal?	James	ABS-CBN	
2010–2011	Imortal	Philemon	ABS-CBN	
2010–2011	Your Song Presents: Kim	Jess	ABS-CBN	
2011	Regal Shocker		TV5	
2012	Lumayo Ka Man sa Akin	Neil	ABS-CBN	
2012–2013	Paraiso	Eric Gonzales	ABS-CBN	
2013	Kailangan Ko’y Ikaw	Mario	ABS-CBN	
2013	The Voice of the Philippines	Contestant (with Grace Lorenzana)	ABS-CBN	
2014	Moon of Desire	Philip	ABS-CBN	
2014	Wansapanataym		ABS-CBN	
2014–2015	Dream Dad	Francis	ABS-CBN	
2015	Maalaala Mo Kaya		ABS-CBN	
2016	The Greatest Love	Gerald Samonte	ABS-CBN	
2017	My Dear Heart	Young Dr. Albertus	ABS-CBN	
2017	The Better Half		ABS-CBN	
2020	Almost Paradise	Lester Cordero	WGN America (original U.S. broadcast); Kapamilya Channel, A2Z, iWantTFC (Philippines)	
2021	Parang Kayo Pero Hindi	Anthony	Vivamax	
2022	An/Na	Benedict	Vivamax	
2022	Secrets of a Nympho		Vivamax	
2022–2023	K-Love	David	Viu	
2023	Big Bet	Police Chief Achilles	Disney+	
2025	Golden Scenery of Tomorrow		Viva One	
2026	Love, Siargao	Sir Paul	Viu; GMA Network	
2026	The CEO's New Jowa	David	HONOR Philippines social media	

Almost Paradise was co-produced by ABS-CBN and Electric Entertainment. Big Bet was produced by BA Entertainment, C-JeS Entertainment and Arc Media. Love, Siargao was made through a partnership between Viu Philippines, Viva Communications and GMA Network. Secrets of a Nympho is listed in REIN Entertainment's production catalogue.

==== Additional television and digital credits ====
Title	Role	Network / platform	References
Maalaala Mo Kaya: Storybook	Lauro	ABS-CBN	
Hair Is Your Moment	Jason Abad	ABS-CBN	
Maalaala Mo Kaya: Kwintas	Joseph	ABS-CBN	
I Dare You	Himself	ABS-CBN	
Regal Shocker: Salamin	Raymond	TV5	
Cityscapes	Host	ANC	
Wansapanataym: Christmas Caroline	Charles Andrews	ABS-CBN	
Wansapanataym: Witchy Mitch	Arthur	ABS-CBN	
May Isang Pangarap	Himself	ABS-CBN	
Wansapanataym: Perfecto	Mr. Santos	ABS-CBN	
Dear MOR: The Macy and Alex Story	Alex	ABS-CBN Mobile	
Maalaala Mo Kaya: Gitara	Jason	ABS-CBN	
The Wives of House Number 2	Travis	Sari-Sari Channel	

== Discography ==
=== Solo releases ===
Year	Title	Type	References
2005	Five Days More	Release	
2006	Guji Lorenzana	Release	
2007	Without Your Love	Album	
2017	“Paralyzed” (featuring Moophs)	Single	
2017	“We Are”	Single	
2018	“Be Alright”	Single	
2018	“My Vow”	Single	
2018	“Why”	Single	
2019	“Be Alright (Reprise)”	Single	
2019	“Keep Me” (featuring Vince Lucero)	Single	
2020	“I’ll Never Let You Go”	Single	
2022	“This Beat Will Save You”	Single	
2022	“Next in Line”	Single	
2024	“The City Lights” (featuring Nico Maxx Mina)	Single	
2024	“Better Man (Live Session)”	Single	
2024	“Cold Water (Live Session)”	Single	
2024	“Wake Me Up (Live Session)”	Single	
2025	“Hold Back the River (Live Session)”	Single	
2025	Live Sessions	EP	

=== Group releases ===
Year	Artist	Title	Type	References
2010	Voizboys	Fusion	Album	
2017	TFTI	“Weak”	Single	
2019	TFTI	“Forevermore”	Single	
2019	TFTI	“O Holy Night”	Single	
2026	TFTI (featuring RJ dela Fuente, Guji and Janjay Coquilla)	“In Christ Alone”	Single	

== Awards and nominations ==
Year	Award	Category	Work	Result	References
2008	Awit Awards	Best Male Performance	“Tagumpay”	Nominated	
2009	PMPC Star Awards for Television	Best New Male TV Personality	The Bud Brothers	Nominated	
