= Super Inggo =

Philippine television drama series

- Genre: Action drama; Comedy; Fantasy; Superhero
- Created by: ABS-CBN Studios
- Directed by: Gilbert G. Perez; Malu L. Sevilla
- Starring: Makisig Morales
- Opening theme: "Superhero" by Rocksteddy
- Country of origin: Philippines
- Original language: Filipino
- No. of episodes: 120

Production
- Executive producers: Shiela Marie A. Ocampo; Emilio Paul E. Siojo
- Production locations: Metro Manila; Batangas
- Running time: 20-30 minutes

Original release
- Network: ABS-CBN
- Release: August 28, 2006 – February 9, 2007

Related
- Super Inggo 1.5: Ang Bagong Bangis; Super Inggo at ang Super Tropa

Super Inggo is a Philippine television drama action superhero series broadcast by ABS-CBN. Directed by Gilbert G. Perez and Malu L. Sevilla, it stars Makisig Morales in the title role. It aired on the network's Primetime Bida line up from August 28, 2006 to February 9, 2007, replacing Sa Piling Mo and was replaced by Maria Flordeluna. The ranking number 2 in the nationwide Philippine Nielsen ratings.

On November 3, 2007, the show went on air again as a prelude installment, titled Super Inggo 1.5: Ang Bagong Bangis.

== Production ==
- Super Inggo was developed by a group of certified 1980s kids, who have started working for TV, led by Liendro Candelaria. Missing their childhood campy heroes and missing the love teams of That's Entertainment, these creative minds pitched the concept of the superserye purely for the fun of seeing their heroes go through marriage and parenthood.
- The pilot episode got rave reviews from ABS-CBN top management, so taping went full steam ahead. But the biggest hurdle was when the all succeeding episodes got rejected because they were too "gothic."
- Thirty-five half-hour episodes rewritten, re-shot, re-edited and re-scored. The producers saved what they could of the original taped episodes, and shot new takes. Result: a six-month delay. But the most shocking was Mark Anthony Fernandez's hairstyle that changed from short to long in two consecutive scenes — an offshoot of tapings shot so far apart.

== Synopsis ==
The story focuses on its 10-year old central character named Budong who dreams to be a full-pledged superhero. Unknown to him, he possesses superhuman abilities that he inherited from his superhero father and Evil Mother, Bugan. Raised by his adoptive mother Pacita, he grew up to be a street smart kid together with his best friend Jomar. He secretly entered the Power Academy to train as a superhero and become "Super Inggo" which gave the Prince of Darkness the idea of Budong being his long lost son, which he had with Bugan. The Prince of Darkness created strategies to confirm it and in order to fulfill his plan to complete the circle of Evil Trinity. It was later revealed that his half-brother Jomar was actually the Son of the Prince of Darkness and their biological mother is Bugan.

== Cast and characters ==
=== Superheroes ===
Cast of Super Inggo

- Makisig Morales as Gilbert John "Budong" Jacinto/Super Inggo - Raised by his adoptive mother Pacita, Budong grew up to be a street smart 10-year-old boy who dreams to be a superhero. Unknown to him is that he possesses extraordinary gifts which he inherited from his Superhero father. He was recruited by the Power academy to train and join the league of superheroes which was into an objection to his mother's decision. Soon he decided to enroll into the academy and became "Super Inggo" because of a premonition that his mother will be in grave danger. Soon he will discover that his real mother was the Bugan. Budong is the son of Super Islaw.
- Joshua Dionisio as Mighty Ken - a boy and who has special powers, his parents had been murdered by the Tikbalang king.
- Andrew Muhlach as Amazing Teg - one of Budong's closest rivals in the Power Academy. He also holds a deadly secret.
- Sam Concepcion as Boy Bawang - Kumander Bawang's son and is the superhero idol of Budong.
- Herbert Bautista as Kumander Bawang - one of the main instructors and headmaster of the Power Academy.
- Zanjoe Marudo as Super Islaw - a crippled man who can turn into a flying superhero who also turned out to be Budong's father.
- Meryll Soriano as Super Inday - Super Islaw's partner and Pacita's sister, but after being trapped in the banga (clay jar) for ten years, she has not remembered from the past.
- Empress Schuck as Ava Avanico - the love interest of Boy, she fights using razor fans, just like her mother, Pepay Paypay. It was later revealed that she was also the daughter of a bloodthirsty aswang (ghoul) and later she will join The Clan.
- Derek Ramsay as Louie/Machete - a sculpted figure that change into a tribal warrior.
- Empoy Marquez as Petrang Kabayo - also a teacher in Power Academy, he teaches about animal kind. His tail has a power to talk to wild animals.
- Geoff Taylor as himself - Leader of The Clan. But he is also the one who guards the gates of hell right after the end of episode.
- Helga Krapf as herself - also one of The Clan, elder sister of Paige. She joined the clan to search her own father. When she left behind, Geoff is the one who guards the gates of hell while Visam was also fell dead.
- Visam Arenas as himself - also one of The Clan, he joined because he wants to search questions about his parents and where could they be he has an ability to make a number of copies of himself and ability to stop falling objects. Before the end of episode, he fell dead by the Prince of Darkness and he will never return to be alive.
- Kristoff Abrenica as Baltimore - also one of The Clan, once bitten by a vampire.
- Rico Barrera as Arkanghel - one of the teachers in Power Academy, he teaches how to fly.
- Matt Evans as Pedro Penduko - one of the teachers in Power Academy, he has mastery over a huge bestiary of monster and creatures in Philippine folklore.

=== Human characters ===
- Jairus Aquino as Pareng Jomar - the Son of Leandro, the Hari ng Kadiliman or "Prince of Darkness", raised and adopted by his Kuya Paloy, he grew up to be a street smart witty kid after his biological mother left for Hong Kong. She was absent for a very long time, but Jomar never lost hope in seeing his mother again. He also dreams to be a superhero like Budong. Also known as "Pambansang Bestfriend ng Pilipinas" (National Bestfriend of the Philippines) and sidekick to Budong. At the later part of the story, he discovered that he is the son of the Prince of Darkness and Bugan which proved him to be the key in the completion of the Evil Trinity. He also discovered that he and Budong are biologically half-brothers.
- Kathryn Bernardo as Maya Guevarra - love interest of Budong and daughter of Kanor. Budong refers to her as his "babes". She has a crush on Super Inggo.
- Angelu de Leon as Pacita Jacinto - the adoptive mother of Budong and sister to Super Inday.
- Alwyn Uytingco as Paloy - adoptive brother of Jomar.
- Mark Anthony Fernandez as Nicanor "Kanor" Guevarra - father of Maya, loving husband of Cynthia.
- Kaye Abad as Cynthia - Kanor's 2nd wife, it was later revealed that she was a Tikbalang.
- Nova Villa as Lola Juaning - grandmother of Budong and the mother-in-law of Pacita.
- Kris Martinez as Joe Diokno - Lola Juaning's love interest.
- Matutina as Lola Impa - Granny of Ava
- Dominic Roco as JP
- Felix Roco as PJ

=== Villains ===
- Leandro ang Hari/Prinsipe Ng Kadiliman or " Prince of Darkness (POD)" (Brad Murdoch) - The primary villain in the story. Leandro is actually a very loving son who wants to free his mother from hell after saving him by using its Evil powers. He made an agreement with Lucifer that he will Complete the circle of the Evil Trinity which comprises the Evil Father (POD), Evil Mother (Bugan) and Evil Son (Jomar) which will lead to the resurrection of Lucifer through his son Jomar and the Reign of Darkness in the face of the Earth. Sometimes he transforms into a kid, Jack, played by Jacob Dionisio.
- Bugan ang "Halimaw sa Banga" (Ai-Ai delas Alas) - A babaylan (local priestess) and a very loving mother who possesses extraordinary powers. but after being sealed by her tribe in the Jar for thousands of years that led to the deaths of her husband and her first son, she was transformed into a monster full of Hatred and Vengeance. She was released into the jar that led her into battle against the Super heroes. But later, she seduced Islaw in order to prevent her from having a child against the Prince of Darkness which will assure the completion of POD's plan of Evil trinity. But POD planted his evil seed using his powers on Bugan which led to the birth of the siblings Budong and Jomar.
- Shiela the "White Lady" (Say Alonzo) - Sheila, a lost pretty girl who become an evil White Lady who kidnapped children and abducts the latter to be her husband.
- Chuva Chew Chewing Gum - Monster summoned by the Prince of Darkness which is made out of Bubblegum. The purpose of this is for POD to get rid of the Superheroes but this monster lately was defeated by Super Inday and Super Islaw.
- Lotus Feet - One of POD's servants who was summoned in order to make Petrang Kabayo and Jessa Blusa removed their powers from Bugan's banga (jar) that protects it from being opened.
- Nestor ang "Supremo ng mga Aswang" (Ariel Reonal) - Known to be Ava Avanico's father and Kumander Bawang's rival in Pepay Paypay's (Ava's mother) heart.
- Stephanie And The Ghouls - Stephanie is Ava's cousin and also the leader of the ghouls.
- Linlang the "ShapeShifter" - Power to morph into different forms.
- Junanaks - A group of dead children who tells lies and disguised themselves as monsters
- The Black Angels - Flying army of black angels, made by POD.
- Headless Soldier - One of the chosen army of POD.
- Tikbalang - Alter ego of Cynthia.

=== Other Superheroes and creatures ===
- Pepay Paypay - Mother of Ava Avanico, the wife of Nestor.
- Golden Bibe - The pet duck of Inday.
- Krystala - one of the trainees in Power Academy.
- Panday - one of the trainees in Power Academy.
- Aqua Boy - one of the trainees in Power Academy.
- Aqua or Agua Bendita - one of the teachers in Power Academy.
- Fairies or Lambana - flying creatures living inside the Power Academy.
- Machete - one of the teachers in power academy

== Super Inggo at ang Super Tropa (Animated Series) ==
Super Inggo at ang Super Tropa is the first collaborative project between ABS-CBN TV Production, represented by business unit head and Vice President for TV Production Enrico Santos, and the newly formed ABS-CBN Animation Department, led by business unit head Guia Jose.

The animated TV series that is expected to be shown not only in the Philippines but also globally. For this reason, the creators of the anime series is careful not to put elements that are unacceptable in Muslim communities such as sexy clothing and religious items such as crosses.

The very first 100% Filipino-made animated series premiered on Philippine TV on November 22, 2009. It airs every Sundays at 10:15 am on ABS-CBN.

== International broadcasts ==
- Philippines – Yey! replacing Charlotte
- Malaysia – TV9 the series was aired around September 2008

This series is currently streaming on Kapamilya Online Live Global every Tuesdays to Saturdays, 12:00am–2:00am and was also replacing Nathaniel on the following day (May 17).

== Recognitions ==
- Finalist, 2007 International Emmy Awards for the category "Children and Young People": Regional Semi-finalist
- Special Citation, 2007 Catholic Mass Media Awards Best Drama Series category

== See also ==
- List of shows previously aired by ABS-CBN
- List of telenovelas of ABS-CBN
