= Haya Saleh =

Jordanian writer

- Born: 1977 (age 48–49) Sahab
- Citizenship: Jordan
- Education: Al Al, Bayt University
- Occupations: Short story writer and literary critic
- Board member of: Jordanian Writers Society

Haya Saleh Ibrahim (Arabic: هيا صالح) is a Jordanian critic, novelist, playwright, drama writer and children's writer born in 1977, working in the Art House and as a critic and writer in the field of theatre and drama.

== Education ==
She holds a high school diploma in 1994 and a bachelor's degree in Arabic language and literature from Al al-Bayt University in 1999.

== Memberships and positions ==
- Member of the Jordanian Writers Society.
- Member of the High Committee of the Jordanian Family Library/Ministry of Culture, 2018.
- Member of the jury of the Michel Sandaha Literary Creativity Competition, organized by the National Orthodox School, 2017.
- Member of the editorial board of the cultural magazine "Madarej".
- Member of the Special Committee for the Evaluation of the Creative Sabbatical Project/ Ministry of Culture, 2017.
- Member of the jury of the third session of the Reader's Young Talented Writers Award, 2017.
- Member of the Jury of the Khalil Al-Sakini Award for Children's Literature/Jordanian Writers Association, 2016.
- Member of the jury of the "Heck Ahla" children's competition (Story Field) organized by the Directorate of Culture in Greater Amman Secretariat, 2014.
- Honorary Member of Naji Noman House of Culture, Beirut, 2013.
- Member of the Manuscript Evaluation Committee of the Jordanian Ministry of Culture (2012).
- Member of the Manuscript Evaluation Committee of the Greater Amman Secretariat, 2010/11.
- Member of the editorial board of Wissam Children's Magazine, Ministry of Culture, 2009-2011.
- Member of the Arab Internet Writers Union (and member of its Administrative Committee in Jordan), 2007/08.
- Member of the jury at the Irbid City of Jordanian Culture/Children's Literature Competition, 2007.

== Publications ==
=== Children's books ===
- "Fruit Cake", Stories, Ministry of Culture, Amman, 2006. i2, Ministry of Culture, Amman, 2010.
- "Selma and the Larvae", Illustrated Story, Ministry of Culture, Amman, 2009.
- "The Grape Basket", Tales of Peoples' Heritage Translated from English, Jordanian Press Foundation (Al-Rai), Amman, 2010. i2, Ministry of Culture, Amman, 2012.
- "Why are dogs chasing cats?" Tales of the Heritage of the Peoples, Greater Amman Secretariat, Amman, 2011.
- "Biography of a Paper", Illustrated Story, Ministry of Culture, Amman, 2012. i2, Ministry of Culture, Amman, 2013.
- "Little Shamma in Big Trouble", a story (in the book "Naji Noman Literary Awards", Beirut, 2013).
- "Light Soil", boys' novel, Department of Culture and Media, Sharjah, 2013.
- "A Small World", Illustrated Story, Dar Kalimat, Sharjah, 2014.
- "Tarek Painting", Children's Illustrated Story, Greater Amman Secretariat, Amman, 2015.
- "I have the right to", theatrical text (in the book "Theatrical Texts 5", Arab Theatre Commission, Sharjah, 2014).
- "Little Shamma in Big Trouble," Children's Photo Story, Ministry of Culture, Amman, 2016.
- "Why I Love Reading," Children's Video Story, Garden House, Beirut, 2016.
- I'm not ruining it. I Draw, Children's Illustrated Story, Department of Culture, Sharjah, 2017.

==== Literary criticism books ====
- "Narrative of Life", Readings in Arabic Fiction and Stories, Arab Press Agency, Cairo, 2010.
- "Reference and Shadows", Articles in Novels from Jordan, Ministry of Culture, Amman, 2010.
- "Self-deprecation", Articles in contemporary Jordanian story, Nara Publishing and Distribution House, Amman, 2006. i2, Arab Press Agency, Cairo, 2012.
- "Memory Doors", Articles in Arab Story Experiences, Ministry of Culture, Amman, 2013.
- "Distance Zero: Novel clashes and life", articles in Arabic fiction experiences, Andalusian Cultural Salon and Now Publishers and Distributors, Montreal/Canada and Oman, 2014.

== Awards ==
- Katara Prize for Arabic Fiction, for her novel "Another Color of The Sunset" (2018).
- Jordanian State Award in Children's Literature (2017).
- Nasser al-Din al-Assad Award for Critical Studies awarded by the Jordanian Writers Society for her book Distance Zero. Novel clashes and life" (2016).
- Her theatrical text "In the Hands of a Star" received the highest rating from the High Advisory Committee on the Selection of Texts participating in the Childish Creativity Festival, Ministry of Culture, Amman, 2016.
- "In the Hands of a Star" (text by her author) won the best integrated performance award from the Childish Creativity Festival organized by the Ministry of Culture, Amman, 2016.
- Her book Biography of a Paper won the Best Arab Book for Children award, Sharjah, United Arab Emirates, 2013.
- The manuscript of her story, "Little Shama in Big Trouble", won the Literary Creativity Award, Naji Noman Foundation for Culture, Beirut, 2013.
- Her child-oriented text "It's my right to" won the Children's Theatre Text Competition (3rd place), Arab Theatre Authority, Sharjah, 2013.
- The episode of the "Sanabel Magazine" programme, prepared for children and broadcast by Jordanian radio, won the golden prize at the Radio and Television Festival, Tunisia, 2009
