= Makisig Morales =

Filipino former actor (born 1996)

- Morales in Super Inggo
- Born: December 22, 1996 (age 29); San Mateo, Rizal, Philippines
- Years active: 2001–2018
- Agent: Star Magic (2006–2018)
- Television: Super Inggo
- Spouse: Nicole Joson (m. 2019)
- Musical career
- Label: Star Music

Makisig Morales (born December 22, 1996) is a Filipino-Australian former actor who appeared on the TV show Little Big Star and is the delivery man of the boy band Mak and the Dudes. As a child actor, he played the lead role in the International Emmy-nominated fantaserye Super Inggo.

Morales is the second child of Davao City residents Uldarico and Jacqueline. His siblings include brothers and sisters, Mayumi, Magiting, Maaya, Maliksi, Marikit, Mahinhin, Malambing, Maningning, and Matikas.

At the age of 5, Morales competed in the Duet Bulilit, a singing segment in MTB, a noon-time variety show of ABS-CBN, together with his sister Mayumi. Morales later auditioned with his sister Mayumi and brother Vincent in Little Big Star, a TV singing contest of ABS-CBN, where only Makisig and Mayumi were accepted to compete with other contestants. In 2007, he was announced as the co-host for the next series of Little Big Star. He is the older brother of the child actor Maliksi Morales.

== Filmography ==
=== Film ===
| Year | Title | Role | Note |
|---|---|---|---|
| 2007 | Ang Cute ng Ina Mo! | Budong | Cameo role |
| 2008 | Supahpapalicious | Atong | |
| 2008 | Caregiver | Sean | |
| 2010 | Petrang Kabayo | Young Peter/Pedro | |
| 2012 | Larong Bata | Marlon | |
| 2012 | Shake, Rattle and Roll Fourteen: The Invasion | Bunag | Segment: "Lost Command" |

=== Television ===
| Year | Title | Role | Note |
|---|---|---|---|
| 2001 | Magandang Tanghali Bayan (Duet Bulilit) | Himself | Contestant |
| 2005 | Little Big Star | First runner-up | Contestant |
| 2005 | Little Big Superstar | Himself | Co-host |
| 2006–2007 | Super Inggo | Super Inggo/Budong | Lead Role |
| 2007 | Komiks Presents: Pedro Penduko at ang mga Engkantao | Moy | Lead / Supporting Role |
| 2007 | Super Inggo 1.5: Ang Bagong Bangis | Super Inggo/Budong | Lead Role |
| 2008 | I Am KC | Kato or Francis | Guest Appearance |
| 2009 | Midnight DJ (Atake ng KaraOke) | OX | Guest Appearance |
| 2009 | May Bukas Pa | Jepoy | Special Guest Appearance |
| 2009 | Super Inggo at ang Super Tropa | Budong/Super Inggo | Lead Role (voice) |
| 2009 | Maalaala Mo Kaya: Karnabal | Roysan | Lead Character |
| 2010 | Magkano ang Iyong Dangal? | Young Nilo | Guest Appearance |
| 2010 | Habang May Buhay | Young Nonoy | Guest Appearance |
| 2010 | Maalaala Mo Kaya: Camera | Jerson | Supporting Role |
| 2010 | Shout Out! | Himself | Performer |
| 2010 | Maalaala Mo Kaya: Gitara | Ely Boy | Supporting Role |
| 2010 | Midnight DJ: Tikbalang | Jay | Guest Appearance |
| 2010 | Precious Hearts Romances Presents: Midnight Phantom | Gabriel | Supporting Role |
| 2011 | Maalaala Mo Kaya: Palengke | James | Supporting Role |
| 2011 | Wansapanataym: Joy's Toys | Bok | Supporting Role |
| 2011 | Maalaala Mo Kaya: Langis | Gary | Supporting Role |
| 2011 | Real Confessions | Islaw | Lead Role |
| 2012 | Oka2kat | Neil | Lead Role |
| 2012 | Luv U | Einstein | Supporting Role |
| 2012 | Maalaala Mo Kaya: Bangka | Ricky | Supporting Role |
| 2014 | Mirabella | Jefferson | Supporting Role |
| 2015–2016 | FPJ's Ang Probinsyano | Alfonso S. Tuazon | Supporting Role |
| 2016 | Born for You | Jepoy | Main Role |
| 2017 | A Love to Last | Donald | Supporting Role |
| 2018 | Bagani | Dumakulem (Taga-Gubat) | Main Role |

== Discography ==
| Album | Year of release | Track listing |
|---|---|---|
| Little Big Star (Little Big Star Finalist) | 2006 | Kaba |
| Little Big Deeds (Makisig, Sam, Micah, Charice, Kyle and other LBS Finalist) | 2006 | Awit ng Kabutihang Asal; Katapatan; Sana |
| Super X-Mas (Makisig Morales) | 2006 | Superhero; Tito, Tita |
| Pinoy Biggie Hits (Makisig Morales) | 2007 | Superhero |
| Little Big Superstar (Makisig with Sarah Geronimo, Lucky Me Kids and LBS Kids) | 2007 | Sisikat 'Din Ako; All you need is Love; Araw 'natin Toh; Lucky, Lucky Me |
| Nagmamahal Kapamilya (Makisig Morales) | 2007 | Yesterday's Dream |
| Oldies But Kiddies (Mak and the Dudes) | 2007 | Breaking up is hard to do Oh! Carol; Stand By Me; Runaway; Diana; Ang cute ng ina mo Araw 'natin Toh! (ABS-CBN Summer Station ID) |

== Awards ==
| Year | Award-Giving Body | Category | Work | Result |
|---|---|---|---|---|
| 2008 | GMMSF Box-Office Entertainment Awards | Most Popular Male Child Performer | | Won |
