= Iñaki Vicente =

Filipino footballer (1955–2020)

Personal information
- Full name: Ignacio Vicente y Barredo
- Date of birth: c. 1954
- Date of death: 9 January 2020 (aged 65–66)
- Place of death: Philippines
- Position: Forward

Youth career
- 1968–1972: La Salle Green Hills

College career
Years	Team	Apps	(Gls)
1973–1976	De La Salle University		

Senior career*
Years	Team	Apps	(Gls)
- San Miguel Corp.
- Pepsi Cola
- PTGWO
- Tancho
- Tigers
- Manila Jockey Club

International career
1971–1989	Philippines		
1971–1974	Philippines U19		
- * Club domestic league appearances and goals

Ignacio "Iñaki" Vicente y Barredo (1956 – 9 January 2020) was a hispanofilipino footballer who played as a forward for the Philippine National Football Team.

== Education ==
Vicente-Barredo attended La Salle Green Hills for his elementary and high school education. He finished his basic education in 1972 and entered De La Salle University, where he graduated in 1977 with a bachelor's degree in business administration.

== Career ==
An active collegiate player in the 1970s, Vicente played for the senior football team of the De La Salle University from 1973 to 1976. He also played for the junior football team of La Salle Green Hills as a high school student from 1968 to 1972.

In the club level, Vicente has played for San Miguel Corporation's football team, helping the team in making its runner-up finish in the 1977 Lobregat Cup. He also played for other teams such as Pepsi Cola, PTGWO, Tancho, Tigers, and the football team of the Manila Jockey Club.

Vicente was a player for the Philippines senior national team from 1973 to 1989, taking part in the Asian qualifiers for the 1972 Summer Olympics in 1971, and in the Asian qualifiers for the 1976 Summer Olympics in 1973. He was also part of the squad that played in the 1974 Asian Games and also represented the Philippines in the AFC Youth Championship in 1971, 1972, and 1974.

== Personal life ==
Ignacio Vicente-Barredo was born to the late Ignacio Vicente y Longa of Hacienda La Paz, Báis, Oriental Negros and Ángela Gabriela Barredo y Johnson of San Miguel, Manila. He was married to Leticia Macalálag (known by her stage name Honeylet Montenegro) who is the daughter of the celebrated Philippine film actor Mario Montenegro. His father Ignacio Vicente y Longa, played for the national team in Interport tournaments in Hong Kong while his brothers also played for De La Salle. His daughter, Valeen Montenegro is an television personality.

== Later life and death ==
Vicente served as the general manager of the Kaya Football Academy in his later years. He suffered from a stroke in October 2019 and died 9 January 2020, at age 65.
