= Krista Ranillo =

Filipino actress

Krista Ranillo Salazar
- Born: Cristalle Lauren Tupaz Ranillo; 10 December 1984 (age 41); Quezon City, Philippines
- Other name: Krista Ranillo-Lim
- Occupations: Actress, Model
- Years active: 1996–2005, 2008–2010
- Height: 5 ft 1 in (155 cm)
- Spouse: Nino Jefferson Lim (m. 2010)
- Children: 5
- Parents: Mat Ranillo III; Linda Tupaz

Cristalle Lauren Tupaz Ranillo-Lim (born 10 December 1981), known professionally as Krista Ranillo, is a Filipino actress. She comes from a "showbiz family" and earned her degree in 2007. In 2010 she married businessman Nino Jefferson Lim in a Jewish-interfaith ceremony. She has reportedly taken off from acting to pursue a law degree.

== Filmography ==
=== Television ===
Year	Title	Role
1996–1997	Lyra	Shayne
1999–2001	Rio Del Mar	Giselle
1999–2000	Liwanag ng Hatinggabi	
2000–2003	SOP	performer
2001	Kool Ka Lang	Guest
2001	Hawak Ko ang Langit	Diane
2002	Ang Iibigin ay Ikaw	Scarlet
2004	Forever in My Heart	Gem
2008	Chosuey	Guest
2008	HushHush	Aleza
2008	Pieta	Martha
2009	Precious Hearts Romances Presents: The Bud Brothers	Lily Rose
2009	Hole in the Wall	Celebrity player
2009	Banana Split	Herself (Guest)
2009	May Bukas Pa	Mia Valera
2010	Agimat: Ang Mga Alamat ni Ramon Revilla: Tonyong Bayawak	Carla Lapera

=== Movies ===
- Most Wanted (2000)
- Two Timer (2002)
- Paupahan (2008)
- Iskul Bukol: 20 Years After (2008)
- Wapakman (2009)
