= Super Inggo 1.5: Ang Bagong Bangis =

- Title card
- Genre: Superhero; Science fiction Fantasy; Drama; Comedy
- Directed by: Gilbert G. Perez
- Starring: Makisig Morales; Jairus Aquino; Angelu De Leon; Zanjoe Marudo; Meryll Soriano; Kathryn Bernardo; Herbert Bautista; Joshua Dionisio; Andrew Muhlach; Jacob Dionisio; Kaye Abad; Nova Villa
- Opening theme: "Superhero" by Makisig Morales
- Country of origin: Philippines
- Original language: Filipino
- No. of episodes: 7

Production
- Running time: 45 minutes

Original release
- Network: ABS-CBN
- Release: November 3 – December 15, 2007

Related
- Super Inggo

Super Inggo 1.5: Ang Bagong Bangis (lit. the new wildness) is a Philippine television drama action superhero series broadcast by ABS-CBN. The series is a sequel to 2006 Philippine television drama series of the same title. Directed by Gilbert G. Perez, it stars Makisig Morales in the title role. It aired on the network's Saturday evening line up and worldwide on TFC from November 3 to December 15, 2007, replacing John en Shirley and was replaced by Sabado Movie Specials.

== Plot ==
In Super Inggo 1.5: Ang Bagong Bangis, Budong/Super Inggo continues his exciting journey as the ultimate Pinoy kid superhero. Can the power of his pure, kind heart overpower his haunting past? Will this be enough for him to save his family and friends from the Prince of Darkness and his legions?

What is the measure of a true superhero? This is the question that our young protagonist will try to answer in Super Inggo 1.5. Budong and his family have transferred to the town of San Roque after fleeing their old town Sto. Nino, which was attacked by giant monsters. He will meet Lola Facunda, the mother of Pacita and Super Inday; as well as new friends such as Bokia, the talking cellphone (a play on the cellphone brand, Nokia); and Chin-Chin Tsinelas.

== Cast and characters ==
=== Main ===
- Makisig Morales as Super Inggo/Budong
- Jairus Aquino as Jomar
- Joshua Dionisio as Mighty Ken
- Andrew Muhlach as Amazing Teg
- Kathryn Bernardo as Maya
- Empoy as Horshie
- Zanjoe Marudo as Super Islaw
- Meryll Soriano as Super Inday
- Nova Villa as Lola Juaning
- Angelu de Leon as Pacita
- Kaye Abad as Cynthia
- Brad Murdoch as Leandro (POD)
- Jacob Dionisio as Jack (POD's alter ego)
- Kris Martinez as Joe Diokno
- Herbert Bautista as Kumander Bawang

=== Additional ===
- Ian Galliguez as Sheryl
- Liza Lorena as Lola Facunda - mother of Pacita & Super Inday
- John Prats as ProtecThor - sent by Kumander Bawang to watch over Budong and help him during dire circumstances. He is also one of the new Super heroes recruited from the Power Academy. His powers are heightened sense of smell, touch, and hearing.
- Bobby Andrews as Binatang X - Super Islaw's rival. He will use Budong to seek revenge against Super Islaw. He has a love interest in Pacita.
- Erich Gonzales as Maeboo - she has the ability to bring the dead back to life as zombies. To her, her power is a curse. Hence, she decided to join Prince of Darkness to rid herself of her powers.
- Dionne Monsanto as Salonna - a salon owner seeking revenge against shallow individuals, ones who only look at good looks of a person.
- Marvin Raymundo as Nenok - has the ability to steal the power of superheroes. His power is limited by the fact that once he steals a new power, his previous power will return to its original owner.
- Jaymee Joaquin as Bianca Bankera/Barracuda - has the ability to call the creatures of the sea. This ability was given to her by a boyfriend who is one of the merpeople.
- Khaycee "KC" Aboloc as Golden Bibe - Super Inday's pet duck who was morphed into a girl.
- Mel Martinez, Rustom Padilla, Whitney Tyson, & Lilia Cuntapay as Super Inday's alter egos
- Tess Antonio as Tina
- Jennifer Illustre as Manilyn - the Chenelyn Witches.
- Eric Fructuoso as Tikbalang King
- Minnie Aguilar as Chin-Chin Tsinelas
- Ray Allen as "Bokia" (the talking cellphone) (a play on the cellphone brand Nokia)

== See also ==
- Super Inggo
- List of programs broadcast by ABS-CBN
