= The Bud Brothers Series =

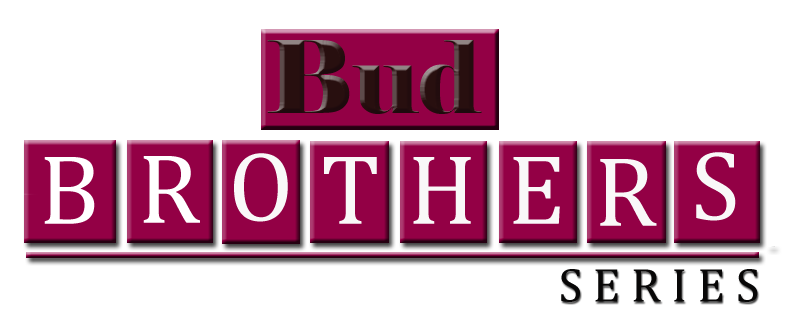
- Author: Rose Tan
- Language: Filipino
- Series: eight books
- Genre: Romance, Comedy
- Publisher: Precious Pages Corporation
- Publication date: July 2002
- Publication place: Philippines
- Media type: Print (paperback)

The Bud Brothers Series is a group of eight best selling novels written by Filipino Romance writer, Rose Tan. It sold more than 15,000 copies during its first printing in the Philippines in 2002 and has been expanded into a franchise (Bud Brothers Group and Bud Brothers Unlimited) by its Publisher Precious Pages Corp by 2005.

== Synopsis ==
The books tells the story of eight different men (Vince Banaag, Wayne Alban, Pete Labrador, Carlo Domingo, Dr. Ed Lacson, Rei Arambulo, Monty Geronimo & Pio Andong Jr.) who decided to start a flower farm, called The Bud Brothers Flower Farm, in Lian, Batangas and their adventures in love.

The story revolves around 8 men, who eventually each have their own love story. In each book tells the story of how they met their 'the one'. Stupid cupid- Georgie being the new student in their college is being attracted to many boys, including Vince. However, she has her eyes on the playboy Pio who is Vince's best friend, after a little fight with someone who tried to harass Georgie she instantly falls for Pio and his good looks. Pio asks Georgie on a date, she instantly accepts not knowing the date is actually with Vince at first the idea of her being Vince's girlfriend was the answer to her problems, but when Vince listens to a voice recording of her telling her 'diary' she is only using Vince to get to Pio. They break up but Vince does not know she has actually fallen for him, Georgie's reputation would go down hill if everyone found out he broke up with her so she spreads a rumour to say that he does not know how to kiss, after a slight misunderstanding Georgie moves to Singapore and they don't see each other for at least 5 years. After 5 years, Georgie goes home however her father does not believe that the biological mother of the baby she brings with her home is only the baby of her best friend Maying. On the day of Pio's wedding Georgie shows up seeing Vince. They are still very attracted to each other but don't treat each other very well. After the bud brothers kick Georgie into Vince's house, living in one house brings them closer and after a black out, Georgie is still very scared of the dark and Vince helps her through the night. Eventually, Vince proposes and stands as the father of Mary.

My gulay wow Betchay- Betchay lives in a poor environment working as a personal assistant to Alyssa Rodriguez. Alyssa is the obsessive stalker of Wayne Alban so she sends Betchay to spy on him at his flower farm. Betchay applies as the secretary of the Bud brothers. Betchay is intimidated by Wayne and ruins his gumamela plants, these plants are Wayne's personal project and gets angry when he finds out someone has ruined his plants he shouts at his employees telling them that if they don't find out who ruined his plants nobody gets their wage. But, after Betchay gives him a lecture about having a conscience to those who have done nothing wrong. She seeks help from Carlo to help her admit that she was the one who ruined Wayne's project, he tells her he wants her to show up in normal clothes because Wayne does not like to see ugly people. The next day, Wayne notices her change and instantly gets attracted to her, however whilst she is breaking down about what she had done Wayne tells her she needs to pretend to be his wife in order for him to forgive her. Wayne explains that his mother is approves of his relationship with Alyssa but admits to Betchay that Alyssa is only his stalker, also it slipped out of his mouth that he is already married even though he's not so he is getting help from Betchay. She agrees, and living under the same roof as each other.. Wayne opens up for Betchay and eventually he explains his past to her, and they get married.

Red roses for a blue lady- Coco a painter is a widow and hides herself from the world, she is misunderstood as an aswang and Carlo is the only one who is willing to be bit for her as he is very attracted to her. Carlo, being the pilyo that he is, helps Coco to paint again. After he helps her to paint, she eventually falls in love with him.

Heads you lose, tails your mine- Tammy meets Pete, a man who is afraid of commitment. She falls in love with him and does not understand what the concept of love is; however, when she sees Betchay Wayne Coco and Carlo, she finds out that when your married you see more of what good things you do than the bad. She makes Pete jealous by using his close friend Ed, Pete eventually finds out he loves Tammy and marries her.

He's the one- Hiromi is the rival flower shop who hates the bud brothers as she blames them for her business going down hill. Hiromi eventually falls for Ed, breaks up with her current fiancé and agrees to the partnership between the petals and bud brothers.

Peppers roses- Pepper and Rei are childhood friends, however after 5 years in America at his return Pepper and Rei aren't close anymore. However, learning each of their father's feud with each other, Pepper and Rei pretend to be boyfriend and girlfriend to help each of their father's. In the end, Rei proposes to Pepper.

Once-in-a-lifetime love- Monty is a player who is dating Sabel's cousin, but when Sabel is ordered to investigate Monty she falls in love with him.

Bud brothers- Pio and Sandy, Vince and Georgie, Wayne and Betchay, Carlo and Coco, Pete and Tammy, Ed and Hiromi, Monty and Sabel are all happily married and after 5 years of their Bud Brothers partnership, they decide to celebrate. But when Ivy, the sister of Wayne's ex-girlfriend comes to take revenge on Wayne because he is blamed for the cause of her sister's death. Betchay has a heart problem and has to choose between her and her baby, Pio and Sandy's relationship are nearly being annulled and Pio and Ivy start to live together. In the end, the Bud brothers become the front of their dream magazine MENS MAGAZINE.

== TV Adaptation ==
On February 12, 2009, ABS-CBN signed a contract with Precious Pages for the right to translate the series into a TV adaptation.
