= Rose Tan =

Filipino writer

Rose Tan (born 4 September) is the pen name of a Filipino writer who mostly creates romance and thriller Tagalog pocketbook novels. Her most notable work is The Bud Brother Series that has been televised by ABS-CBN under the same series name.

== Personal life ==
Tan was born on September 4 and was a graduate of Mass Communication in the Far Eastern University (FEU). She is a single mother to a son and she stated in an interview with the morning show Pambansang Almusal that she would not want her child to read her novels, as some scenarios may not be suitable for children.

== Career ==
In the same interview with Pambansang Almusal, she admitted that she lost track of how many novels she has created. Her most popular creation is The Bud Brothers Series when it was adapted into a television series.

== Bibliography ==
=== Balawis ===
First Edition (Year)	Title	Series
2018	Balawis: Hooks and Crooks	Balawis
2018	Balawis: Honor Among Thieves	Balawis
2018	Balawis: The Confidence Man	Balawis

=== Best Men Don't Wed Society ===
First Edition (Year)	Title	Series
2003	Once Bitten, Twice Shy	Best Men Don't Wed Society
2003	What Do You Get When You Fall In Love	Best Men Don't Wed Society
2003	The Best Man Gets The Bride	Best Men Don't Wed Society

=== Blush ===
First Edition (Year)	Title	Series
2006	Crush Clash	Blush
2006	Crush Curse	Blush
2006	Oh, Nicky, You're So Fine!	Blush
2006	The Prom Queen	Blush
2006	Dreaming Of You	Blush
2017	Sinisinta Kita, Tunay na Tunay	Blush
2017	My Girl, Brini	Blush
2017	Jack In The Box	Blush
2017	He Loves Me, He Loves Me So	Blush
2017	The Woman Who Could Not Be Taken	Blush
2017	You're Still You	Blush
2017	Dream On	Blush
2017	Corduroy Betty	Blush
2017	Charmed	Blush
2017	My Pal, Andoy	Blush
2017	Will Of The Heart	Blush
2017	Titibuk-tibok-Kakabog-kabog	Blush

=== Bud Brothers ===
==== Bud Brothers Group ====
First Edition (Year)	Title	Series
2004	Scarlette Fever	Bud Brothers Group
2004	In Zane!	Bud Brothers Group
2005	A Love Like Yours	Bud Brothers Group
2005	Love Yah, Hate Yah	Bud Brothers Group
2005	Catch Me, I'm Fallen	Bud Brothers Group
2005	Bud Luck	Bud Brothers Group

==== Bud Brothers Series ====
First Edition (Year)	Title	Series
1998	Ang Akin ay Akin, Ang Iyo ay Akin pa rin	Bud Brothers Series
2002	Stupid Cupids	Bud Brothers Series
2002	My Golly, Wow Betsy!	Bud Brothers Series
2002	Red Roses For A Blue Lady	Bud Brothers Series
2002	Tail You Lose, Head You're Mine	Bud Brothers Series
2002	He's The One	Bud Brothers Series
2002	Pepper's Roses	Bud Brothers Series
2003	Once In A Lifetime Love	Bud Brothers Series
2003	Bewitched, Bothered, Bewildered	Bud Brothers Series

==== Bud Brothers Unlimited Series ====
First Edition (Year)	Title	Series
2009	Curious Rufus and The Jilted Daffodil	Bud Brothers Unlimited Series
2009	Ponce d' Pogi and d' Promdi	Bud Brothers Unlimited Series
2009	Rascus Maximus Guapus	Bud Brothers Unlimited Series
2009	A Peony For Your Thoughts	Bud Brothers Unlimited Series
2009	Ring Around The Rosie	Bud Brothers Unlimited Series
2009	Shiela Gumamela	Bud Brothers Unlimited Series
2009	Hyacinth and the Bud Guy	Bud Brothers Unlimited Series
2009	Petunia and Fidel (Awesome Twosome)	Bud Brothers Unlimited Series
2010	Holly Is Thy Name	Bud Brothers Unlimited Series
2010	The Bloomer Bandits (An Introduction)	Bud Brothers Unlimited Series
2010	The Bloomer Bandits (Gordian)	Bud Brothers Unlimited Series
2010	The Bloomer Bandits (Antenor)	Bud Brothers Unlimited Series
2010	The Bloomer Bandits (Hutch)	Bud Brothers Unlimited Series
2010	The Bloomer Bandits (Mitch)	Bud Brothers Unlimited Series
2011	The Bloomer Bandits (Miles)	Bud Brothers Unlimited Series
2011	The Bloomer Bandits (Chuck)	Bud Brothers Unlimited Series
2011	The Bloomer Bandits (Victoriano)	Bud Brothers Unlimited Series
2011	The Bloomer Bandits (Drick)	Bud Brothers Unlimited Series
2011	The Bloomer Bandits (Buboy)	Bud Brothers Unlimited Series
2011	The Bloomer Bandits (Islaw)	Bud Brothers Unlimited Series
2012	The Bloomer Bandits (Rehan)	Bud Brothers Unlimited Series
2012	The Bloomer Bandits (Luisito)	Bud Brothers Unlimited Series
2013	Rook	Bud Brothers Unlimited Series
2013	Corgy	Bud Brothers Unlimited Series
2013	Badong	Bud Brothers Unlimited Series
2013	Guido	Bud Brothers Unlimited Series
2013	Baby's Breath	Bud Brothers Unlimited Series
2013	The Bloomer Bandits (Tranquilino)	Bud Brothers Unlimited Series

=== Cinderella ===
First Edition (Year)	Title	Series
2002	Epifania - The Maid	Cinderella
2002	Emilia - The Gullible	Cinderella
	Tarcila - The Beautiful Intruder	Cinderella
2003	Cinny - The Tamed Shrew	Cinderella

=== Engkanto ===
First Edition (Year)	Title	Series
2017	Engkanto	Engkanto
2019	Malefica	Engkanto

=== Frenemies ===
First Edition (Year)	Title	Series
	Marry Me On Tuesday	Frenemies
2015	The Shadow Of His Smile	Frenemies
2015	The Prodigal Wife	Frenemies

=== Fruitcakes ===
First Edition (Year)	Title	Series
2007	My Fair Lady (In Straight jacket)	Fruitcakes
2007	Naughty And Naughty	Fruitcakes
2007	Mutya Ng Madre Cacao	Fruitcakes
2008	The Nerd	Fruitcakes
2008	Cuckoodoodleduo	Fruitcakes
2008	The Stalker	Fruitcakes
2008	The Love That Never Was	Fruitcakes
2008	Ang Sumpa	Fruitcakes
2008	Octavio Takes A Wife	Fruitcakes
2008	Witch Ko `Yan	Fruitcakes
2008	Agapito Romantiko	Fruitcakes
2008	Sing No Sad Songs	Fruitcakes

=== Hot Intruder ===
First Edition (Year)	Title	Series
2011	The Man With The Golden Grin	Hot Intruder
2012	Arthus, Ang Pambihirang Farm Boy	Hot Intruder

=== Huddunit ===
First Edition (Year)	Title	Series
2018	Huddunit 1	Huddunit
2018	Huddunit 2	Huddunit
2018	Huddunit 3	Huddunit

=== Impakta ===
First Edition (Year)	Title	Series
2016	Impakta	Impakta
2016	Impakta 2	Impakta

=== IOU Series ===
First Edition (Year)	Title	Series
2017	Clint, Mr. Daddy Pants	IOU Men
2017	Mako, The Charmer	IOU Men
2015	Samantha, The Nanny	IOU Series
2015	Des, The Miserable	IOU Series

=== Jewels ===
First Edition (Year)	Title	Series
	Finders Keeper	Jewels
2004	Treasure Hearts	Jewels

=== Last Trip ===
First Edition (Year)	Title	Series
2003	If I Could, I Surely Would	Last Trip

=== Maty Go Mystery ===
First Edition (Year)	Title	Series
2009	Bad Hair Day	Maty Go Mystery
2009	Cat In The Bag	Maty Go Mystery
2010	Fernando's Hideaway	Maty Go Mystery
2013	Wedded Bliss	Maty Go Mystery
	Baby Blues	Maty Go Mystery
2015	The Girl From Yesterday	Maty Go Mystery
2014	Sleuthing Anette	Maty Go Mystery Offshoot

=== Mga Apo ni Rustica ===
First Edition (Year)	Title	Series
2014	Let Me Be, Set Me Free (From Your Spell)	Mga Apo ni Rustica
2014	The Girl In His Arms (Is The Witch In His Heart)	Mga Apo ni Rustica
2014	Be The Devil, Be The Light (I Don't Care, Darling, Just Be Mine)	Mga Apo ni Rustica

=== Modern Girl ===
First Edition (Year)	Title	Series
2006	Material Girl	Modern Girl
2006	The First Principle	Modern Girl
2006	Kikay Kit	Modern Girl

=== My Love, My Hero ===
First Edition (Year)	Title	Series
1999	Augusto Luis	My Love, My Hero
1999	Augusto Leon	My Love, My Hero
1999	Augusto Jose	My Love, My Hero
2000	Leon Augusto	My Love, My Hero
2000	Magtanggol	My Love, My Hero
2000	Fidel Sacay	My Love, My Hero
2000	Aleron	My Love, My Hero
2000	Alfonso	My Love, My Hero
2000	Dominador	My Love, My Hero
2001	Pancho	My Love, My Hero
2001	Rigor Mortiz	My Love, My Hero
2001	Mondragon	My Love, My Hero
2001	Montero	My Love, My Hero
2001	Riggs	My Love, My Hero
2004	Arsenio	My Love, My Hero
2005	Andres	My Love, My Hero
2006	Bruce	My Love, My Hero
2007	Stan	My Love, My Hero
2007	Tobias	My Love, My Hero
2008	Godofredo Malaya	My Love, My Hero
2009	Severino	My Love, My Hero

=== My Lovely Bride ===
First Edition (Year)	Title	Series
2000	Fides and Albertito	My Lovely Bride
2002	Libby and Quentin	My Lovely Bride
2001	Pen-pen and Leroy	My Lovely Bride
2005	Benicia and Norman	My Lovely Bride
2000	Patricia and Stan	My Lovely Bride
2000	Remigia and Gregorio	My Lovely Bride
2000	Adoracion and Honesto	My Lovely Bride
2005	Guillerma and Adamo	My Lovely Bride
2001	Alfreda and Diomedes	My Lovely Bride

=== PHR Classics ===
First Edition (Year)	Title	Series
	Ako Ba'y Mahal Mo Na?	PHR Classics

=== Rebel Fiction ===
First Edition (Year)	Title	Series
2016	Marceline Cinco’s Highschool Survival Guide	Rebel Fiction
2017	Hitman Tony’s Summer Camp Survival Guide	Rebel Fiction
2018	Arvy Nicole's First Love Survival Guide	Rebel Fiction
2019	Time After Time	Rebel Fiction

=== Secrets ===
First Edition (Year)	Title	Series
2000	Harriet's Search	Secrets
2000	Harriet's Find	Secrets
2000	Now and for always	Secrets
	Siklab	Secrets
	Girl Next Door	Secrets

=== Señorita ===
First Edition (Year)	Title	Series
2000	Veronica	Señorita
2000	Renalda	Señorita
2000	Bettina	Señorita
2001	Margarita	Señorita
2001	Gracita	Señorita
	Pureza	Señorita
2001	Conchita	Señorita
2001	Concordia	Señorita
2001	Felicia	Señorita
2001	Agatha	Señorita
2001	Flavianna	Señorita
2001	Ricarda	Señorita
2002	Marquita Book 1	Señorita
2002	Marquita Book 2	Señorita
2002	Henrietta Book 1	Señorita
2002	Henrietta Book 2	Señorita
2002	Rosanna	Señorita
2002	Maria	Señorita
2002	Blanquita	Señorita
	Morgana	Señorita
2003	Natalia	Señorita
	Julianna	Señorita
2003	Paris	Señorita
	Tatiana	Señorita
2004	Richelda	Señorita
2005	Emilianna	Señorita
2007	Georgia	Señorita
2007	Matilda	Señorita
2007	Allegra	Señorita
2007	Graciella	Señorita
2007	Fabiola	Señorita
2012	Honoria	Señorita
2013	Constantina	Señorita
2013	Candida	Señorita
2013	Alodia	Señorita
2017	Olleta	Señorita
2017	Bibiana	Señorita
2017	Ursula	Señorita

=== Señorito ===
First Edition (Year)	Title	Series
2003	Algernon	Señorito
2003	Robertito	Señorito
2003	Aristeo	Señorito
2003	Demetrio	Señorito
2003	Fausto	Señorito
2003	Hugo	Señorito
2003	Juancho	Señorito
2003	Dillon	Señorito
2005	Braullio	Señorito
2005	Gregorio	Señorito
2006	Genaro	Señorito
2008	Marciano	Señorito
2008	Sylvanno	Señorito
2008	Calixto	Señorito
2008	Caleb	Señorito
2009	Don Luciano	Señorito
2009	Pedro	Señorito
2018	Juan	Señorito
2018	Gemeniano	Señorito
2019	Lope	Señorito

=== Somewhere in my Heart (Tales of the Traveling Bling) ===
First Edition (Year)	Title	Series
2009	Trini	Somewhere in my Heart (Tales of the Traveling Bling)
	Blinky	Somewhere in my Heart (Tales of the Traveling Bling)
2009	Michelle	Somewhere in my Heart (Tales of the Traveling Bling)
2010	Ignacia	Somewhere in my Heart (Tales of the Traveling Bling)
2010	Race	Somewhere in my Heart (Tales of the Traveling Bling)
2010	Camille	Somewhere in my Heart (Tales of the Traveling Bling)

=== Standalone Novels ===
==== Thin Version ====
First Edition (Year)	Title	Series
1997	El Amor Barako	Standalone (Thin Version)
1997	Tunay at Wagas	Standalone (Thin Version)
2002	Magbalik Ka Pag-ibig	Standalone (Thin Version)
1998	Accidental Bride	Standalone (Thin Version)
1998	Undercover Lover	Standalone (Thin Version)
1998	To Catch a Thief	Standalone (Thin Version)
	Sweet Honesty	Standalone (Thin Version)
1998	Mr. Dreammaker	Standalone (Thin Version)
1998	Goodbye Girl	Standalone (Thin Version)
1998	What Now, My Heart?	Standalone (Thin Version)
1998	Which Way is Home?	Standalone (Thin Version)
1999	My Head Say No, My Heart Says I Love You	Standalone (Thin Version)
	Carrie	Standalone (Thin Version)
	Whirlwind	Standalone (Thin Version)
1999	Semper Fidelis (Always Faithful)	Standalone (Thin Version)
	My Naughty Lady	Standalone (Thin Version)
1999	Pagkahaba-haba Man Daw ng Prusisyon sa Simbahan Din Ang Tuloy	Standalone (Thin Version)
1999	M.F.E.O (Meant For Each Other)	Standalone (Thin Version)
	Nakakulong Na Puso	Standalone (Thin Version)
2000	Oryang	Standalone (Thin Version)
2000	For Keeps	Standalone (Thin Version)
2000	My Best friend, Pete	Standalone (Thin Version)
2000	Sabi Ng Puso	Standalone (Thin Version)
2000	Sweet Periwinkle	Standalone (Thin Version)
2000	Stolen Dream	Standalone (Thin Version)
2000	My Babe	Standalone (Thin Version)
2000	My Love, My Destiny	Standalone (Thin Version)
2000	My Girl Sunday	Standalone (Thin Version)
2000	The Nanny	Standalone (Thin Version)
2000	Jealous Guy	Standalone (Thin Version)
2000	On My Honor	Standalone (Thin Version)
2000	The Love Bug	Standalone (Thin Version)
2003	Bogus Bride	Standalone (Thin Version)
2000	Surrender My Love	Standalone (Thin Version)
2000	Suddenly	Standalone (Thin Version)
2000	First kiss	Standalone (Thin Version)
2001	Wedding Bells & Magic Spells	Standalone (Thin Version)
2001	Why Is The Because?	Standalone (Thin Version)
2001	Somewhere in My heart	Standalone (Thin Version)
2001	With His Song	Standalone (Thin Version)
2001	Se Llama Chiquita	Standalone (Thin Version)
	Fortune Cookie	Standalone (Thin Version)
2001	Sa Habang Panahon	Standalone (Thin Version)
	Huwag Kang Mangako	Standalone (Thin Version)
2001	Take a Chance	Standalone (Thin Version)
	Rightfully Mine	Standalone (Thin Version)
2000	Black Magic Woman	Standalone (Thin Version)
2001	Ang Huling El Dindo	Standalone (Thin Version)
2004	Love Comes Knocking	Standalone (Thin Version)
2005	You Bet!	Standalone (Thin Version)
2007	Ang Pamana Ni Lola	Standalone (Thin Version)
2006	I Love you More	Standalone (Thin Version)
2006	Get Real	Standalone (Thin Version)
2006	Bahay Ni Laurendo	Standalone (Thin Version)
2007	Ang Lihim Ng Bahaghari	Standalone (Thin Version)
2006	Meant To Be	Standalone (Thin Version)
2007	Oops!	Standalone (Thin Version)
2007	Robyn's Nest	Standalone (Thin Version)
2007	Papa Caloy	Standalone (Thin Version)
2007	It's Magic	Standalone (Thin Version)
	Take A Vow	Standalone (Thin Version)
2008	The List	Standalone (Thin Version)
2008	The Ring Bearer	Standalone (Thin Version)
2008	Ang Kasunduan	Standalone (Thin Version)
2008	First Love Swear (Stronger Than A Promise, Deeper Than A Dare)	Standalone (Thin Version)
2008	Ang Ninakaw Mong Puso	Standalone (Thin Version)
2008	Ang Tigang na Puso Ni Purita	Standalone (Thin Version)
2008	Groom For Hire	Standalone (Thin Version)
2008	Tillie Do Us Part	Standalone (Thin Version)
2009	Ang Dalagang Bukid	Standalone (Thin Version)
2009	Shut Up and Kiss Me	Standalone (Thin Version)
2009	Once There Was A Friend	Standalone (Thin Version)
2009	Bahay-bahayan	Standalone (Thin Version)
2009	Ay, Yayay, O Pag-ibig...	Standalone (Thin Version)
2009	MISsFORTUNe	Standalone (Thin Version)
2009	Happy Together	Standalone (Thin Version)
2009	A Kiss For Keeps	Standalone (Thin Version)
2010	Prinsesang Kokak	Standalone (Thin Version)
2010	Ale, Pwede Ka Bang Mahalin?	Standalone (Thin Version)
2011	Mana Po	Standalone (Thin Version)
2011	Head Over Heels	Standalone (Thin Version)
	A Taste Of Bliss	Standalone (Thin Version)
2011	Nobody's Girl	Standalone (Thin Version)
2012	Sweeter At First Sight	Standalone (Thin Version)
2012	Butterfly Kisses For You	Standalone (Thin Version)
2012	Mischief and Mayhem	Standalone (Thin Version)
2012	Ang Sumpa Mo, Neneng	Standalone (Thin Version)
2013	The Knights Wears A Fedora	Standalone (Thin Version)
2013	Ghost In You	Standalone (Thin Version)
2013	Needles And Pins	Standalone (Thin Version)
2013	To Be Kissed	Standalone (Thin Version)
2014	Lonesome, Awesome	Standalone (Thin Version)
2015	About A Girl	Standalone (Thin Version)
2015	Wish I May, Wish I Might	Standalone (Thin Version)
2014	Daydreams And Memories	Standalone (Thin Version)
2015	Pay to Cash	Standalone (Thin Version)
2015	Interview With Molly	Standalone (Thin Version)
2015	Lucky Pick (Itanong Mo Sa Akin)	Standalone (Thin Version)
	Decoding His Heart	Standalone (Thin Version)
2016	Blackmailed	Standalone (Thin Version)
2017	WTF (Well, That's Fantastic)	Standalone (Thin Version)

==== Thick Version ====
First Edition (Year)	Title	Series
2010	Ang Awit ni Diosa	Standalone (Thick Version)
2012	Travis In Love	Standalone (Thick Version)
2013	Wicked	Standalone (Thick Version)
2015	Gold Digger	Standalone (Thick Version)
2015	The Woman He Loves	Standalone (Thick Version)
2015	Brak (The Bastard of Agron)	Standalone (Thick Version)
2016	Arik the Traitor of Krohn	Standalone (Thick Version)

=== Sylvia Roces Love Files ===
First Edition (Year)	Title	Series
2003	Cock-A-Doodle Love	Sylvia Roces Love Files
2001	Inday Ng Buhay Ko	Sylvia Roces Love Files

=== Txtlyf ===
First Edition (Year)	Title	Series
2001	You Don't Know Me	Txtlyf

=== Wedding Bells and Magic Spells ===
First Edition (Year)	Title	Series
2003	Hailey's Comet	Wedding Bells and Magic Spells
2003	Twinkle's Star	Wedding Bells and Magic Spells
2003	Daydream Believers	Wedding Bells and Magic Spells
	Kalembang! Kalembang!	Wedding Bells and Magic Spells
2003	Charmed	Wedding Bells and Magic Spells
2004	Love Signs	Wedding Bells and Magic Spells

=== Writer's Block ===
First Edition (Year)	Title	Series
2017	Roses Are Red, Violets Are Blue	Writer's Block
