= List of former Filipino child actors =

This is a list of child actors from the Philippines. These actors are or were younger than age 20 at the time they started acting. The list also includes deceased child actors.

Movies and/or TV series they appeared in (or are appearing in) are mentioned only if they were still a child at the time of filming.

For the list of current child actors see List of current Filipino child actors.

== List of Filipino former child actors ==
=== A ===
- Kaye Abad (born 1982)
- Sarah Jane Abad (born 1986)
- Althea Ablan (born 2004)
- Louise Abuel (born 2003)
- Tessie Agana (born 1942)
- Carlos Agassi (born 1979)
- Asia Agcaoili (born 1977)
- Nash Aguas (born 1998)
- Anja Aguilar (born 1994)
- Marvin Agustin (born 1979)
- Gina Alajar (born 1959)
- Boy Alano (1941 - 2022) †
- Jojo Alejar (born 1966)
- Elijah Alejo (born 2004)
- Marvelous Alejo (born 1996)
- Chuck Allie (born 1988)
- Kyline Alcantara (born 2002)
- Bea Alonzo (born 1987)
- Gio Alvarez (born 1976)
- Benjamin Alves (born 1989)
- Pinky Amador (born 1966)
- Kyle Alandy Amor (born ?)
- Gerald Anderson (born 1989)
- Sandy Andolong (born 1959)
- Sofia Andres (born 1998)
- Boots Anson-Roa (born 1945)
- Narding Anzures (1928 - 1949) †
- Carlo Aquino (born 1985)
- Jairus Aquino (born 1999)
- Atom Araullo (born 1982)
- Sharmaine Arnaiz (born 1974)
- Will Ashley (born 2002)
- Ynna Asistio (born 1991)
- Rich Asuncion (born 1989)
- Amy Austria (born 1961)
- Dingdong Avanzado (born 1968)
- Lucho Ayala (born 1992)
- Vincent Agpaoa (born 2011)

=== B ===
- Nikki Bacolod (born 1989)
- Raymond Bagatsing (born 1971)
- RK Bagatsing (born 1988)
- Dale Baldillo (born 2000)
- Bamba (born 1979)
- Carol Banawa (born 1981)
- Denise Barbacena (born 1994)
- Roxanne Barcelo (born 1985)
- Carl John Barrameda (born 1993)
- Claudine Barretto (born 1979)
- Gretchen Barretto (born 1970)
- Julia Barretto (born 1997)
- Marjorie Barretto (born 1974)
- Victor Basa (born 1985)
- Harvey Bautista (born 2003)
- Herbert Bautista (born 1968)
- Perla Bautista (born 1940)
- Terence Baylon (born 1984)
- Bentot Jr. (1970 - 2016) †
- Aira Bermudez (born 1983)
- Kris Bernal (born 1989)
- Kathryn Bernardo (born 1996)
- Benjamin Besa (born 1989)
- Bea Binene (born 1997)
- Joseph Bitangcol (born 1984)
- Isabel Blaesi (born 1990)
- Nida Blanca (1936 - 2001) †
- Jackie Lou Blanco (born 1964)
- Onemig Bondoc (born 1977)
- Dina Bonnevie (born 1962)
- Andrea Brillantes (born 2003)
- Sam Bumatay (born 1999)

=== C ===
- Eula Caballero (born 1995)
- Sef Cadayona (born 1989)
- Chacha Cañete (born 2004)
- Izzy Canillo (born 2004)
- Bugoy Cariño (born 2002)
- Bettina Carlos (born 1987)
- Shy Carlos (born 1995)
- Maria Teresa Carlson (1962 - 2001) †
- Albie Casiño (born 1993)
- Rainier Castillo (born 1985)
- Alex Castro (born 1985)
- Ryza Cenon (born 1987)
- Joyce Ching (born 1995)
- Kim Chiu (born 1990)
- Sarah Christophers (born 1986)
- Marky Cielo (1988 - 2008) †
- Julia Clarete (born 1979)
- Aria Clemente (born 1995)
- Neil Coleta (born 1991)
- Max Collins (born 1992)
- Gabby Concepcion (born 1964)
- KC Concepcion (born 1985)
- Sam Concepcion (born 1992)
- Valerie Concepcion (born 1987)
- Yam Concepcion (born 1988)
- Paolo Contis (born 1984)
- Billy Crawford (born 1982)
- Donna Cruz (born 1977)
- Ella Cruz (born 1996)
- Geneva Cruz (born 1976)
- John Lloyd Cruz (born 1983)
- Rayver Cruz (born 1989)
- Rodjun Cruz (born 1987)
- Sheryl Cruz (born 1974)
- Sunshine Cruz (born 1977)
- Tirso Cruz III (born 1952)
- Jake Cuenca (born 1987)
- Sharon Cuneta (born 1966)
- Anne Curtis (born 1985)
- Jasmine Curtis-Smith (born 1994)

=== D ===
- Serena Dalrymple (born 1990)
- Gelli de Belen (born 1973)
- Janice de Belen (born 1968)
- Glaiza de Castro (born 1988)
- Jaypee de Guzman (born 1978)
- JM de Guzman (born 1988)
- Rita de Guzman (born 1995)
- Wowie de Guzman (born 1976)
- Angelu de Leon (born 1979)
- Isabella de Leon (born 1990)
- Keempee de Leon (born 1994)
- Lotlot de Leon (born 1972)
- Matet de Leon (born 1983)
- Michael de Mesa (born 1960)
- Alessandra de Rossi (born 1984)
- Assunta de Rossi (born 1983)
- Sarita Pérez de Tagle (born 1986)
- JC de Vera (born 1986)
- Enchong Dee (born 1988)
- Vaness del Moral (born 1988)
- Janus del Prado (born 1984)
- Martin del Rosario (born 1992)
- Mila del Sol (1923 - 2020) †
- Desiree del Valle (born 1982)
- Kisses Delavin (born 1999)
- Angelika dela Cruz (born 1981)
- Maybelyn dela Cruz (born 1982)
- Mika dela Cruz (born 1999)
- Dianne dela Fuente (born 1981)
- Atang dela Rama (1902 - 1991) †
- Marianne dela Riva (born 1956)
- Camille dela Rosa (born 1982)
- Rogelio dela Rosa (1916 - 1986) †
- Clarence Delgado (born 2004)
- Marissa Delgado (born 1951)
- Karen delos Reyes (born 1984)
- Louise delos Reyes (born 1992)
- Francine Diaz (born 2004)
- Paw Diaz (born 1987)
- Joshua Dionisio (born 1994)
- Lilia Dizon (1928 - 2020) †
- Ryzza Mae Dizon (born 2005)
- Sunshine Dizon (born 1983)
- Cogie Domingo (born 1985)
- Robi Domingo (born 1989)
- Janna Dominguez (born 1990)
- Tippy dos Santos (born 1994)
- Chuckie Dreyfus (born 1974)
- Gabb Drilon (born 1984)
- Nicole Dulalia (born 1997)
- Tita Duran (1928 - 1990) †
- DJ Durano (born 1972)

=== E ===
- Kyle Echarri (born 2003)
- Andi Eigenmann (born 1990)
- Gabby Eigenmann (born 1978)
- Geoff Eigenmann (born 1985)
- Ryan Eigenmann (born 1978)
- ER Ejercito (born 1963)
- Martin Escudero (born 1990)
- Darren Espanto (born 2001)
- John Estrada (born 1973)
- Julian Estrada (born 1996)
- Linda Estrella (1922 - 2012) †
- Ketchup Eusebio (born 1985)

=== F ===
- Ejay Falcon (born 1989)
- Frencheska Farr (born 1992)
- Seth Fedelin (born 2002)
- Grae Fernandez (born 2001)
- Lexi Fernandez (born 1995)
- Mark Anthony Fernandez (born 1979)
- Pops Fernandez (born 1966)
- Renz Fernandez (born 1985)
- Rudy Fernandez (1952 - 2008) †
- Bella Flores (1929 - 2013) †
- Marlann Flores (born 1993)
- Yves Flores (born 1994)
- BJ Forbes (born 1998)
- Barbie Forteza (born 1997)
- Eric Fructuoso (born 1977)
- Amalia Fuentes (1940 - 2019) †
- Kristel Fulgar (born 1994)

=== G ===
- Lyca Gairanod (born 2004)
- Helen Gamboa (born 1945)
- Joross Gamboa (born 1984)
- Brenna Garcia (born 2004)
- Cheska Garcia (born 1980)
- Jean Garcia (born 1969)
- Jennica Garcia (born 1989)
- Joseph Andre Garcia (born 1999)
- Patrick Garcia (born 1981)
- Sergio Garcia (born 1990)
- Tanya Garcia (born 1981)
- Baron Geisler (born 1982)
- Sarah Geronimo (born 1988)
- Janno Gibbs (born 1969)
- Cherie Gil (1963 - 2022) †
- Enrique Gil (born 1992)
- Mark Gil (1961 - 2014) †
- Rosemarie Gil (born 1942)
- Rachelle Ann Go (born 1986)
- Alex Gonzaga (born 1988)
- Toni Gonzaga (born 1984)
- Angeli Gonzales (born 1994)
- Cristina Gonzales (born 1970)
- Erich Gonzales (born 1990)
- Rose Ann Gonzales (born ?)
- Beauty Gonzalez (born 1991)
- Marrion Gopez (born 1992)
- Isabel Granada (1976 - 2017) †
- Ella Guevara (born 1998)
- Tootsie Guevara (born 1980)
- Matteo Guidicelli (born 1990)
- Roxanne Guinoo (born 1986)
- Chris Gutierrez (born 1992)
- Eddie Gutierrez (born 1942)
- Raymond Gutierrez (born 1984)
- Richard Gutierrez (born 1984)
- Ruffa Gutierrez (born 1974)
- Tonton Gutierrez (born 1968)

=== H ===
- Jon Hernandez (1969 - 1993) †
- Glaiza Herradura (born 1978)
- RR Herrera (born ?)

=== I ===
- Alexa Ilacad (born 2000)
- Jay Ilagan (1955 - 1992) † (as "Angel")

=== J ===
- Zaijian Jaranilla (born 2001)
- Zymic Jaranilla (born 2004)

=== K ===
- Kiray (born 1995)

=== L ===
- Sylvia la Torre (1933 - 2022) †
- Juan Karlos Labajo (born 2001)
- Alfred Labatos (born 1992)
- Berting Labra (1933 - 2009) †
- Boom Labrusca (born 1976)
- Eunice Lagusad (born 1998)
- Sarah Lahbati (born 1993)
- Jess Lapid, Jr. (born 1962)
- Jess Lapid, Sr. (1933 - 1968) †
- Lito Lapid (born 1955)
- Anna Larrucea (born 1984)
- Denise Laurel (born 1987)
- Lady Lee (born 1986)
- Mikee Lee (born 1990)
- Kier Legaspi (born 1973)
- Lito Legaspi (1941 - 2019) †
- Zoren Legaspi (born 1972)
- Ronnie Liang (born ?)
- Lilet (born 1974)
- Xian Lim (born 1989)
- Anita Linda (1924 - 2020) †
- Mona Lisa (1922 - 2019) †
- Angel Locsin (born 1985)
- Jade Lopez (born 1987)
- L.A. Lopez (born 1985)
- Mara Lopez (born 1991)
- Nathan Lopez (born 1991)
- Diego Loyzaga (born 1995)
- Jon Lucas (born 1995)
- Pauleen Luna (born 1988)
- Sid Lucero (born 1983)
- Rebecca Lusterio (born 1989)
- Nadine Lustre (born 1991)

=== M ===
- Michelle Madrigal (born 1988)
- Elmo Magalona (born 1994)
- Francis Magalona (1964 - 2009) †
- Maxene Magalona (born 1986)
- Saab Magalona (born 1988)
- Vincent Magbanua (born 2000)
- Jolina Magdangal (born 1978)
- Shaina Magdayao (born 1989)
- Francis Magundayao (born 1999)
- Sabrina Man (born 2000)
- Xyriel Manabat (born 2004)
- Janelle Manahan (born 1989)
- Jay Manalo (born 1973)
- John Manalo (born 1995)
- Jiro Manio (born 1992)
- Jao Mapa (born 1976)
- Joseph Marco (born 1988)
- Belle Mariano (born 2002)
- Jan Marini (born 1978)
- Karel Marquez (born 1986)
- Melanie Marquez (born 1964)
- Teejay Marquez (born 1987)
- Winwyn Marquez (born 1992)
- Zia Marquez (born 1992)
- Carmi Martin (born 1963)
- Albert Martinez (born 1961)
- Alfonso Martinez (born 1988)
- William Martinez (born 1966)
- Alicia Mayer (born 1976)
- Janette McBride (born 1983)
- Ping Medina (born 1983)
- Aiko Melendez (born 1975)
- Melissa Mendez (born 1964)
- Jessy Mendiola (born 1992)
- Hazel Ann Mendoza (born 1988)
- IC Mendoza (born 1988)
- Glydel Mercado (born 1975)
- Jennylyn Mercado (born 1987)
- Lani Mercado (born 1968)
- Sugar Mercado (born 1986)
- Barbara Miguel (born 2004)
- Ara Mina (born 1979)
- Jewel Mische (born 1990)
- Derrick Monasterio (born 1995)
- Diva Montelaba (born 1991)
- Valeen Montenegro (born 1990)
- Julia Montes (born 1995)
- Raquel Monteza (born 1955)
- Arno Morales (born 1993)
- Makisig Morales (born 1996)
- Vina Morales (born 1975)
- Bomber Moran (1944 - 2004) †
- Alma Moreno (born 1959)
- Isko Moreno (born 1974)
- Kristel Moreno (born 1991)
- Morissette (born 1996)
- Marlo Mortel (born 1993)
- Edgar Mortiz (born 1954)
- Iwa Moto (born 1988)
- C.J. Muere (born 1988)
- Aga Muhlach (born 1969)
- AJ Muhlach (born 1992)
- Niño Muhlach (born 1971)
- Arci Muñoz (born 1989)

=== N ===
- CX Navarro (born 2006)
- CJ Navato (born 1996)
- Bea Nicolas (born 1994)
- Amy Nobleza (born ?)

=== O ===
- Miles Ocampo (born 1997)
- Jane Oineza (born 1996)
- Mutya Orquia (born 2006)
- Chynna Ortaleza (born 1982)
- Byron Ortile (born 2002)

=== P ===
- Sofia Pablo (born 2006)
- Bela Padilla (born 1991)
- Daniel Padilla (born 1995)
- Dennis Padilla (born 1962)
- Robin Padilla (born 1969)
- Zsa Zsa Padilla (born 1964)
- Jopay Paguia (born 1983)
- Bernard Palanca (born 1976)
- Mico Palanca (1978 - 2019) †
- Danita Paner (born 1989)
- Kristina Paner (born 1971)
- Angelica Panganiban (born 1986)
- Rochelle Pangilinan (born 1982)
- Paraluman (1923 - 2009) †
- Andre Paras (born 1995)
- Gina Pareño (born 1947)
- Roderick Paulate (born 1960)
- Fred Payawan (born 1989)
- Charice Pempengco (born 1992)
- Paula Peralejo (born 1984)
- Rica Peralejo (born 1981)
- Hiro Peralta (born 1994)
- AJ Perez (1993 - 2011) †
- Amy Perez (born 1969)
- Kurt Perez (born 1997)
- Tyron Perez (1984 - 2011) †
- Anna Maria Perez de Tagle (born 1990)
- Charee Pineda (born 1990)
- Eliza Pineda (born 1995)
- Enzo Pineda (born 1990)
- Fernando Poe, Jr. (1939 - 2004) †
- Lovi Poe (born 1991)
- Jerome Ponce (born 1995)
- Camille Prats (born 1985)
- John Prats (born 1984)
- Stef Prescott (born 1991)
- Yassi Pressman (born 1995)
- Francine Prieto (born 1980)

=== Q ===
- Vandolph Quizon (born 1984)

=== R ===
- Sue Ramirez (born 1966)
- Khalil Ramos (born 1996)
- Rhian Ramos (born 1990)
- Ryan Ramos (born 1996)
- Wendell Ramos (born 1978)
- Krista Ranillo (born 1984)
- Suzette Ranillo (born 1961)
- Polo Ravales (born 1982)
- John Regala (1967 - 2023) †
- James Reid (born 1993)
- Bong Revilla (born 1966)
- Ram Revilla (1988 - 2011) †
- Mona Louise Rey (born 2004)
- Cristine Reyes (born 1989)
- Efren Reyes, Jr. (born 1961)
- Gladys Reyes (born 1977)
- Karen Reyes (born 1996)
- Krystal Reyes (born 1996)
- LJ Reyes (born 1987)
- Thou Reyes (born 1985)
- Manilyn Reynes (born 1972)
- Jackie Rice (born 1990)
- Ronnie Ricketts (born 1965)
- Melissa Ricks (born 1990)
- Ross Rival (1945 - 2007) †
- Ana Roces (born 1976)
- Susan Roces (1941 - 2022) †
- Kim Rodriguez (born 1994)
- Mariel Rodriguez (born 1984)
- Dimples Romana (born 1984)
- Rosa Rosal (1927 - 2025) †
- Jericho Rosales (born 1979)
- Donita Rose (born 1974)
- Rafael Rosell (born 1982)
- Jana Roxas (born 1990)
- Princess Ryan (born 1989)

=== S ===
- John Wayne Sace (born 1989)
- Paul Salas (born 1998)
- Rhap Salazar (born 1997)
- Franchesca Salcedo (born 2002)
- Lea Salonga (born 1971)
- Janella Salvador (born 1998)
- Maja Salvador (born 1988)
- Phillip Salvador (born 1953)
- Nadine Samonte (born 1988)
- Nikki Samonte (born 2000)
- Julie Anne San Jose (born 1994)
- Sharlene San Pedro (born 1999)
- Raymart Santiago (born 1973)
- Gerald Santos (born 1991)
- Judy Ann Santos (born 1978)
- Katya Santos (born 1981 or 1982)
- Kevin Santos (born 1988)
- Vilma Santos (born 1953)
- Yen Santos (born 1992)
- Romnick Sarmenta (born 1972)
- Myrtle Sarrosa (born 1994)
- Empress Schuck (born 1993)
- Aiza Seguerra (born 1983)
- Snooky Serna (born 1966)
- Devon Seron (born 1993)
- DM Sevilla (born 1987)
- Jennifer Sevilla (born 1974)
- Victor Silayan (born 1992)
- Princess Snell (born 1992)
- Liza Soberano (born 1998)
- Chariz Solomon (born 1989)
- Akiko Solon (born 1994)
- Rosemarie Sonora (born 1948)
- Lucita Soriano (1940 - 2015) †
- Maricel Soriano (born 1965)
- Meryll Soriano (born 1982)
- Ciara Sotto (born 1980)
- Oyo Boy Sotto (born 1984)
- Jodi Sta. Maria (born 1982)

=== T ===
- Sandy Talag (born 1998)
- Miguel Tanfelix (born 1998)
- Antoinette Taus (born 1981)
- Tom Taus (born 1986)
- Lorna Tolentino (born 1961)

=== U ===
- Bianca Umali (born 2000)

=== V ===
- Lianne Valentin (born 2001)
- Renz Valerio (born 1998)
- Julie Vega (1968 - 1985) †
- Ian Veneracion (born 1975)
- Ace Vergel (1954 - 2007) †
- Buboy Villar (born 1998)
- Carmina Villarroel (born 1975)

=== W ===
- Pia Wurtzbach (born 1989)
- Jillian Ward (born 2005)

=== Y ===
- Bimby Yap (born 2007)
