= Gokada Go! =

2007 Philippine television teen-oriented comedy series

- Genre: Teen drama Comedy
- Created by: ABS-CBN Entertainment Dept.
- Directed by: Edgar Mortiz
- Starring: Kim Chiu; Gerald Anderson
- Country of origin: Philippines
- Original language: Filipino
- No. of episodes: 9

Production
- Running time: 60 minutes

Original release
- Network: ABS-CBN
- Release: June 2 – July 28, 2007

Related
- Let's Go!

Gokada Go! is a Philippine television teen-oriented comedy series broadcast by ABS-CBN. Directed by Edgar Mortiz, it premiered on June 2, 2007 on the network's Saturday evening line up. The show concluded on July 28, 2007, with a total of 9 episodes.

== Cast ==
Cast

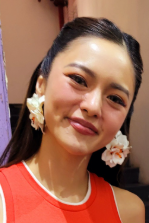
Kim Chiu

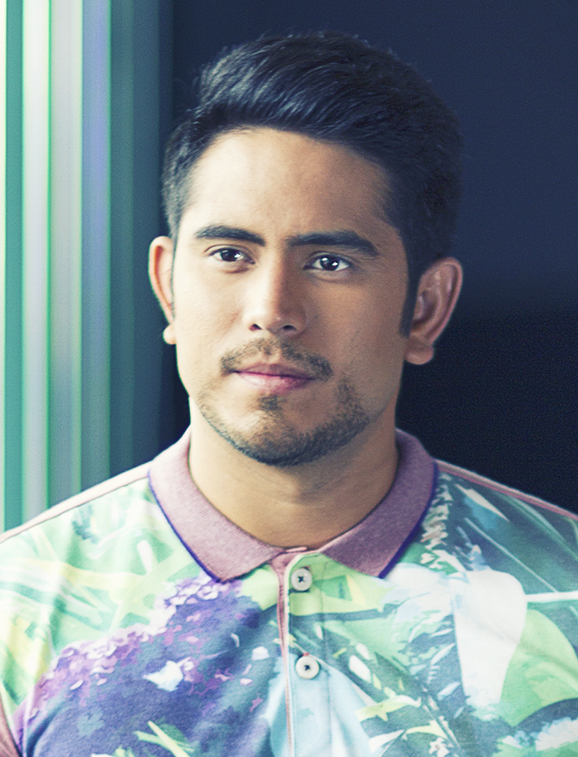
Gerald Anderson

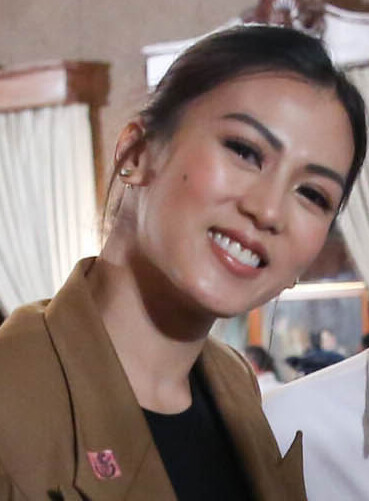
Alex Gonzaga

Lead cast

- Kim Chiu
- Gerald Anderson

Supporting cast

- Gina Pareño
- Matteo Guidicelli
- Eda Nolan
- Joem Bascon
- Alex Gonzaga
- Bangs Garcia
- Badjie Mortiz
- Kontin Roque
- Jana Pablo
- Dianne Medina

== Episodes ==
Episodes of Gokada Go
No. overall	No. in season	Title	Directed by	Original release date	Viewers (millions)
1	1	"First Day Go!"	Unknown	June 2, 2007	N/A
2	2	"Biak Na Bato"	Unknown	June 9, 2007	N/A
3	3	"Go Signal"	Unknown	June 16, 2007	N/A
4	4	"Miss U Like Crazy"	Unknown	June 23, 2007	N/A
5	5	"Let's Go Panty"	Unknown	June 30, 2007	N/A
6	6	"The Naked Truth"	Unknown	July 7, 2007	N/A
7	7	"Go Melody Go"	Unknown	July 14, 2007	N/A
8	8	"Go Kini GO!"	Unknown	July 21, 2007	N/A
9	9	TBA	Unknown	July 28, 2007	N/A
