= Bangs Garcia =

Filipino actress

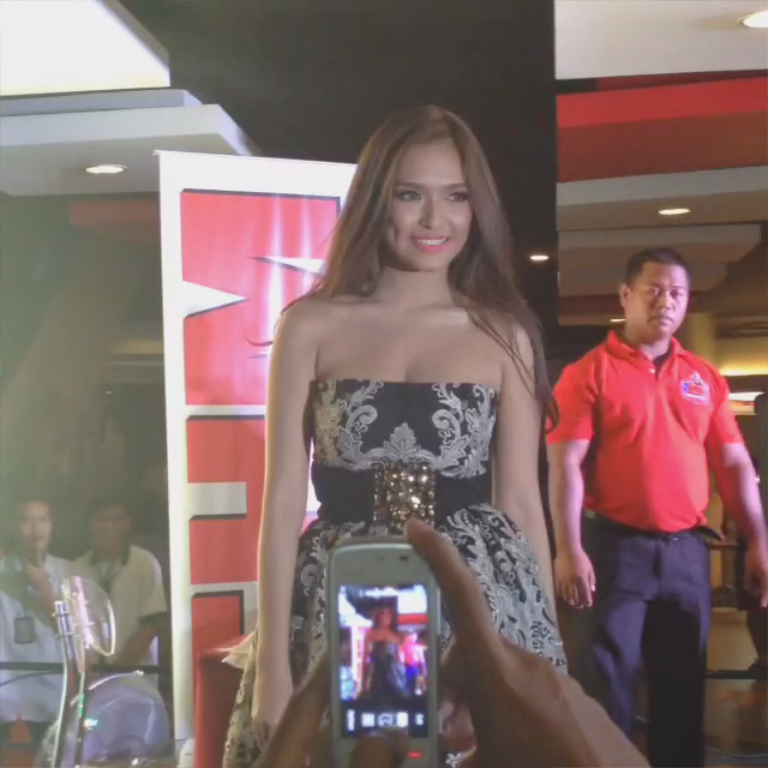
- Born: Valerie Pablo Garcia; May 26, 1987 (age 39); Philippines
- Occupation: Actress
- Years active: 2005–2017
- Spouse: Lloyd Birchmore (m. 2016)
- Children: 2

Valerie "Bangs" Pablo Garcia-Birchmore (Tagalog pronunciation: [gaɾˈsɪa]; born May 26, 1987) is a Filipino-British former model and actress.

== Early life and education ==
Garcia attended Ateneo de Davao University, where she was part of the university's theater and dance groups. While studying for a Nursing degree, she participated in the Mindanao-wide talent search Campus Idols, in 2004, and was awarded a co-hosting stint in ABS-CBN Channel 4 Davao's local variety show KSP: Kapamilya Sabado Party.

== Career ==
In 2005, upon the invitation of Close-Up, who was a major sponsor of Campus Idols; Garcia joined ABS-CBN's Close-Up To Fame talent search, where she finished a runner-up. In the same year, she appeared as the best friend of Cindy Kurleto's Greta in Daddy Di Do Du. She also auditioned for Let's Go! and the first teen-edition of Pinoy Big Brother, eventually choosing the sitcom over the reality show.

Garcia was a series regular on Let's Go! and its final season, renamed Gokada Go!, where she played the emo chick Bangs. Originally credited using her real name, her character in the sitcom eventually gave birth to her screen name.

In 2009, Garcia played leading lady to Jake Cuenca's titular Palos and appeared in TV shows Katorse and Kambal sa Uma and in films Marino and Shake, Rattle & Roll XI.

In the second season of Midnight DJ, she portrayed Samantha "Samgirl"—introduced as the Midnight DJ team's researcher, resident psychic and romantic interest to Oyo Sotto's Samboy—Garcia had to leave show upon landing a lead role in Magkano ang Iyong Dangal?, taking over Roxanne Guinoo.

She appeared in the horror films Bulong and Segunda Mano, both in 2011, and was awarded Best Supporting Actress in the 2011 PASADO Awards for her performance in latter film.

Garcia played the titular character in the period drama psychological thriller Lauriana in 2013 and was awarded Best Actress in the PASADO Awards following year.

== Personal life ==
In 2016, Garcia married British-Filipino businessman Lloyd Birchmore in London. They had another ceremony in Boracay in 2017. The couple have two daughters, Amelia and Isabella.

In July 2024, Garcia announced that she is a naturalized British citizen. She regained her Filipino citizenship in July 2026.

== Filmography ==
=== Film ===
Year	Title	Role	Notes	Source
2007	Sponge Cola: Movie	Videostore Dream Girl	Video short	
2009	Marino	Aya		
2009	Shake, Rattle & Roll XI	Chari	Segment: "Lamanglupa"	
2010	Cinco	Rowena	Segment: "Puso"	
2011	Bulong	Ellen		
2011	Segunda Mano	Anna		
2012	Posas	Grace Resuello		
2012	The Reunion	Shirley		
2012	Migrante			
2012	Coming Soon			
2013	Burgos			
2013	Lauriana	Lauriana		
2013	Sabine	Sabine		
2014	So It's You	Rose		
2015	Baka Siguro Yata	Melissa	Credited as "Valerie "Bangs" Garcia"	
2015	No Boyfriend Since Birth	Hannah		
2015	Manila's Finest	Miriam de Dios		
2015	El Brujo			
2016	Dukot	Girlie		

=== Television ===
Year	Title	Role	Notes	Source
2005	KSP: Kapamilya Sabado Party	Herself ― host	Credited as "Val Garcia"	
2006–07	Let's Go!	Bangs	Credited as "Valerie Garcia"	
2007	Your Song	Angie	Episode: "What Are the Chances"	
2007–14	ASAP	Herself / Performer		
2007	Lastikman	Angie	Credited as "Valerie Garcia"	
2007	Maalaala Mo Kaya	Sheila	Episode: "Cellphone"	
2007	Maalaala Mo Kaya	Laura's cousin	Episode: "Larawan"	
2007	Gokada Go!	Bangs		
2008	Palos	Sylvia		
2009	Kambal sa Uma	Ynez Ocampo		
2009	Katorse	Shakira		
2009–10	Precious Hearts Romances Presents: My Cheating Heart	Arlyn Peralta		
2010	Midnight DJ	Samgirl		
2010	Magkano ang Iyong Dangal?	Carmela		
2010–11	Precious Hearts Romances Presents: Kristine	Diana Montero		
2012	Hiyas	Salve		
2012	Kung Ako'y Iiwan Mo	Mia Pedroso		
2012–13	Luv U	Jessica Casimsiman		
2014	The Legal Wife	Young Sandra de Villa		
2014	Dyesebel	Prinsesa Coralia		
2015	Mac & Chiz	Apple		
2015	Kapamilya, Deal or No Deal	Herself - Briefcase Number 20		
2016	Ang Panday	Ida / Venus Virus		
2017	Ikaw Lang ang Iibigin	young Victoria Quintana-Dela Vega		

== Awards and nominations ==
Year	Work	Organization	Category	Result	Source
2012	Segunda Mano	PASADO Awards	Best Supporting Actress	Won	
2014	Lauriana	PASADO Awards	Best Actress	Won	
2015	Baka Siguro Yata	Cinema One Originals	Best Actress	Nominated	
