= Little Big Superstar =

- Genre: Reality
- Presented by: Sarah Geronimo; Makisig Morales; Jairus Aquino
- Country of origin: Philippines
- Original language: Filipino
- No. of episodes: 13

Production
- Running time: 60 minutes

Original release
- Network: ABS-CBN
- Release: February 10 – May 12, 2007

Little Big Superstar is a 2007 Philippine television reality competition show broadcast by ABS-CBN. Hosted by Sarah Geronimo, it aired on the network's Saturday afternoon line up from February 10 to May 12, 2007, replacing Little Big Star and was replaced by Saturday Afternoon Blockbusters. A spin-off of Little Big Star, Little Big Superstar follows the same format but goes beyond singing to discover the next kid superstar. Bigger and better, it celebrates young talents across different fields, giving aspiring stars the chance to showcase their skills, shine on stage, and prove they have what it takes to become the next big name.

== Format ==
Every week, the final list of contestants will be judged accordingly by our three sets of judges. The first will be the text voters who get 30% of the kid's final score, second will be the three resident judges who will see them weekly as they become the next superstar with 50% and thirdly, introducing the special invited jury which is open to everybody (they may vary from Kapamilya Stars to POP senders) who will use a specialized gadget, the clicker, that instantly determines the special jury's average scores, they get 20%.

The little stars will battle it out weekly in escalating musical skills, from concert performances to drama acting to dance showdown until only one kid will emerge as the Little Big Superstar.

== Finalists ==
=== Super Three ===
- First Honor/Little Big Superstar" "Mr. Heartsong" Ronald Jaimeer Humarang
- Second Honor: "D beat boy" Joshua Cadelina
- Third Honor: "Golden Voice" Trina Alcantara

=== Eliminated ===
- "Singing Darling" Kristine Sanchez
- "Star Princess" Aria Clemente
- "Shining Sweetheart" Janet Japor
- "Mr. Melody" Christian Errol Mercado
- "Music Belle" Jea Reyes
- "Prince Charming" Kristofer Martin Dangculos
- "Junior Heartthrob" Ysrael Carreon
- "Bisdak Siren" Wilmark Lopez Torculas

== Elimination chart ==
Legend
Female	Male	Winner	Runners-Up

Top 1	Top 2	Top 3	Bottom 3/2	Eliminated

Week number:		1	2	3	4	5	6	7	The Super Battle
Elimination date:		03/03/07	03/10/07	03/17/07	03/24/07	04/14/07	04/21/07	04/28/07	05/12/07
Place	Contestant	Result
1	Ronald Humarang		Top 3	Top 3		Btm 3	Btm 2	Top 1	Winner
2	Joshua Cadelina	Top 2	Top 2	Top 1	Top 1	Top 2	Top 1		1st Runner-up
3	Trina Alcantara	Top 1	Top 1	Top 2	Top 2	Top 1		Btm 2	2nd Runner-up
4	Kristine Sanchez	Top 3			Btm 3		Top 2	Elim
5	Aria Clemente				Top 3	Btm 3	Elim
6	Janet Japor		Btm 3	Btm 3	Btm 3	Elim
7	Christian Errol Mercado	Btm 3	Btm 3	Btm 3	Elim
8	Jea Marie Reyes	Btm 3		Elim
9	Kristofer Martin Dangculos		Elim
10	Ysrael Carreon	Elim
11	Wilmark Torculas	Elim

== The Super Battle ==
Ronald Jaimeer became the Little Big Superstar grand champion, having 91.4%. Joshua Cadelina became second, having a score of 90%. Trina Alcantara became the 3rd honor, having 89.1%.

== Judges/Guests ==
- Angelika Dela Cruz - Judge
- Louie Ocampo - Judge
- Joyce Bernal - Judge
- Randy Santiago - Judge
- Wenn V. Deramas - Guest Judge
- Bea Alonzo - Guest Host/Judge
- Ryan Agoncillo - Guest Host

== See also ==
- List of programs broadcast by ABS-CBN
- Little Big Star
