= Let's Go! (Philippine TV series) =

Philippine television sitcom series

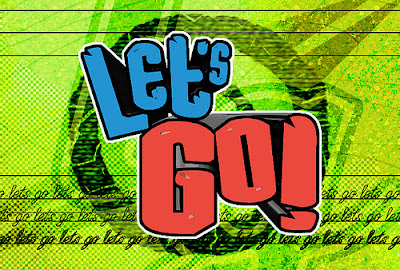
- Genre: Sitcom
- Directed by: Edgar Mortiz; Frasco Mortiz
- Narrated by: Kontin Roque
- Opening theme: "Let's Go" by 13 Needles
- Country of origin: Philippines
- Original language: Tagalog
- No. of episodes: 51

Production
- Executive producer: Ferry Trinidad
- Producer: Dagang Vilbar
- Running time: 45-50 minutes

Original release
- Network: ABS-CBN
- Release: June 3, 2006 – May 19, 2007

Let's Go! is a Philippine television situation comedy broadcast by ABS-CBN. Directed by Edgar Mortiz and Frasco Mortiz, it airsd on the network's Saturday afternoon line up from June 3, 2006 to May 19, 2007.

== Premise ==
The series features the lives of students who have all experienced living in dormitories.

== Cast, characters, and appearance period ==
The cast of the third season of Let's Go!.

Cast table
= Main cast (credited)
= Recurring cast (3+)
= Guest cast (1-2)

Actor	Character	Seasons			
Actor	Character	1	2	3	Gokada Go!
Alex Gonzaga	Alexandra "Alex" Sy	M	M	M	M
Badjie Mortiz	Badjie	M	M	M	M
Valerie Garcia	Bangs	M	M	M	M
Joem Bascon	Bob	M	M	M	M
Charee Pineda	Charie	M	M	M	
Timmy Boy Sta. Maria	Dennis Biazon	M	M	M	
Eda Nolan	Junniper	M	M	M	M
Janelle Quintana	Maffi	M	M	M	
Mikel Campos	Mikel "Mike" Campos	M	M	M	
Blumark Roces	Norman	M	M	M	
Jana Pablo	Trish	M	M	M	G
Kontin Roque	Carl "Zap" Zapatos	M	M	M	M
Smokey Manaloto	Mr. L	M	M	M	
Hyubs Azarcon	Manager	R	R	R	
Dianne Medina	Dianne		M	M	G
Kristoff Abrenica	Kristoff			M	
Jamilla Obispo	Maggie			M	
Rasheed	Rasheed	R	R	M	R
Kim Chiu	Melody			G	M
Gerald Anderson	Gabe			G	M
Matteo Guidicelli	Matteo			G	M
Gina Pareño	Miss Gina				M

== Accolades ==
Accolades received by Let's Go
Year	Award	Category	Recipient	Result	Ref.
2007	21st PMPC Star Awards for Television	Best Youth-Oriented Program	Let's Go	Nominated	
