= Aria Clemente =

Filipino musician (born 1995)

- Born: Aria Daniella H. Clemente; August 29, 1995 (age 31); Malolos, Bulacan, Philippines
- Occupations: Singer, actress
- Years active: 2007–2013
- Agent: Star Magic (2007–2013)

Aria Daniella Hernandez Clemente (born August 29, 1995), also known as Aria Clemente, is a Filipino former singer and actress. She is a former contract artist under ABS-CBN's Star Magic.

== Career ==
Clemente was the second Filipino to win the World Championships of the Arts (WCOPA) award, also known as the "Hollywood Olympics". She won the 2007 junior singer WCOPA award in Hollywood, Los Angeles. She was twelve years old when she was given honor by winning the WCOPA. Four participants from South Africa, New Zealand, Trinidad and Tobago and Russia were her opponents for the junior award. WCOPA is the first global competition that gathers the best performers from 50 countries around the world. There, participants can show their talents in dancing, singing, modeling, acting and others.

STAGES and Star Records came up with a concept album for the then sixteen-year-old performer, not only to officially launch her as a recording artist, but for children her age to have something they can use to sing along with.

Clemente joined Little Big Star in 2007 but did not win; she was the 5th eliminated contestant of the talent show.

She found success in the shortened version of the song "Do Not Rain on My Parade" from the musical Funny Girl. Since winning the WCOPA award, opportunities in acting and singing in the Philippines and abroad arose. She also posted videos of herself singing and playing with her ukulele on YouTube. She had a role in the TV show Mara Clara as Jin Jin.

She enrolled at UST in the College of Fine Arts and Design, majoring in Interior Design until she dropped out in 2016.

She currently resides in United States, working visuals for H.Lorenzo and madhappy.

== Filmography ==
=== Film ===
| Year | Title | Role |
|---|---|---|
| 2006 | Mano Po 5 | Young Charity |

=== Television ===
| Year | Title | Role |
|---|---|---|
| 2007 | Little Big Superstar | Herself/contestant |
| 2008, 2010–2012 | ASAP | Herself/performer |
| 2009 | Parekoy | Hillary Dimagiba |
| 2010–2011 | Mara Clara | Jin-jin |
| 2010–2011 | Shoutout! | Herself/performer |
| 2011 | 100 Days to Heaven | Cielo |

== Awards and nominations ==
| Year | Award giving body | Category | Nominated work | Results |
|---|---|---|---|---|
| 2007 | World Championships of Performing Arts (WCOPA) Awards | Junior Grand Champion Performer of the World | —N/a | Won |
| 2008 | Awit Awards | International Achievement Award | (Junior Grand Champion Performer of the World in the World Championships of Performing Arts) | Won |
