= Kung Ako'y Iiwan Mo =

- Title card
- Genre: Melodrama; Romance
- Created by: ABS-CBN Studios
- Written by: Danica Mae S. Domingo; David Divco
- Directed by: Lino S. Cayetano; Manny Q. Palo; Jojo A. Saguin; Avel E. Sunpongco
- Starring: Jake Cuenca; Shaina Magdayao; Bangs Garcia; Ron Morales
- Theme music composer: George Canseco
- Opening theme: "Kung Ako'y Iiwan Mo" by Angeline Quinto
- Ending theme: "Bakit Pa" by Liezel Garcia
- Country of origin: Philippines
- Original language: Filipino
- No. of episodes: 152

Production
- Executive producers: Carlo Katigbak; Cory Vidanes; Laurenti Dyogi; Roldeo Endrinal
- Producer: Jennifer Borja Soliman
- Production locations: Philippines; Qatar
- Cinematography: Mike Jacinto
- Editors: Alexces Megan Abarquez; Joseph Garcia; Roman Rodriguez III; Shiela Tiglao
- Running time: 45-60 minutes
- Production company: Dreamscape Entertainment Television

Original release
- Network: ABS-CBN
- Release: April 16 – November 16, 2012

Kung Ako'y Iiwan Mo (International title: Without You / transl. If You Ever Leave Me) is a 2012 Philippine television drama romantic series broadcast by ABS-CBN. Directed by Lino S. Cayetano, Manny Q. Palo, Jojo A. Saguin, and Avel E. Sunpongco, it stars Jake Cuenca, Shaina Magdayao, Bangs Garcia and Ron Morales. It aired on the network's Kapamilya Gold lineup and worldwide on TFC from April 16 to November 16, 2012, replacing Angelito: Batang Ama and was replaced by A Gentleman's Dignity.

== Overview ==
The story revolves on the lives of two former childhood friend turned lovers whose destinies pave way through their marriage and try to pave their way of difficult lives as Overseas Filipino Worker (OFW) just to provide for them a better life as a married couple and as a family.

=== Premise ===
The story revolves on fate, and the lives of OFW's making an everyday living to make ends meet in dreams of a better life.

Paul (Jake Cuenca) and Sarah (Shaina Magdayao) are OFWs whose fathers served as inspirations to achieve their goals in life. Throughout their lives, they faced the same obstacles from the past their parents faced emotionally and physically. When trust comes into the picture, their relationship also is at stake. Mia (Bangs Garcia) Paul's former girlfriend also struggles with romantic relationships as well. Mia and Paul's infidelity creates major problems in the end for both of their families, with Sarah finding out Mia is pregnant with Paul's child. This causes Sarah to put both Mia and Paul's lives at stake. After they both end up in jail, and with Sarah coming home to the Philippines, a question hangs in the air: will this relationship end in a failed marriage, or will their love for one another protect their once happily relationship? With all the hardships they've gone and going through, they try their best to prove the world that love can forgive and forget, and that love can totally change someone. Their off and on relationship hopefully heads to happiness, leaving off the sick and obsessed Mia, with the help of the weakling Rino.

== Cast and characters ==
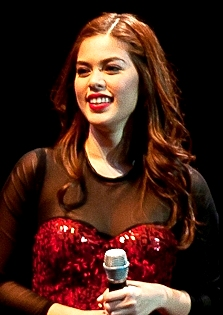
Shaina Magdayao portrays Sarah Natividad-Raymundo

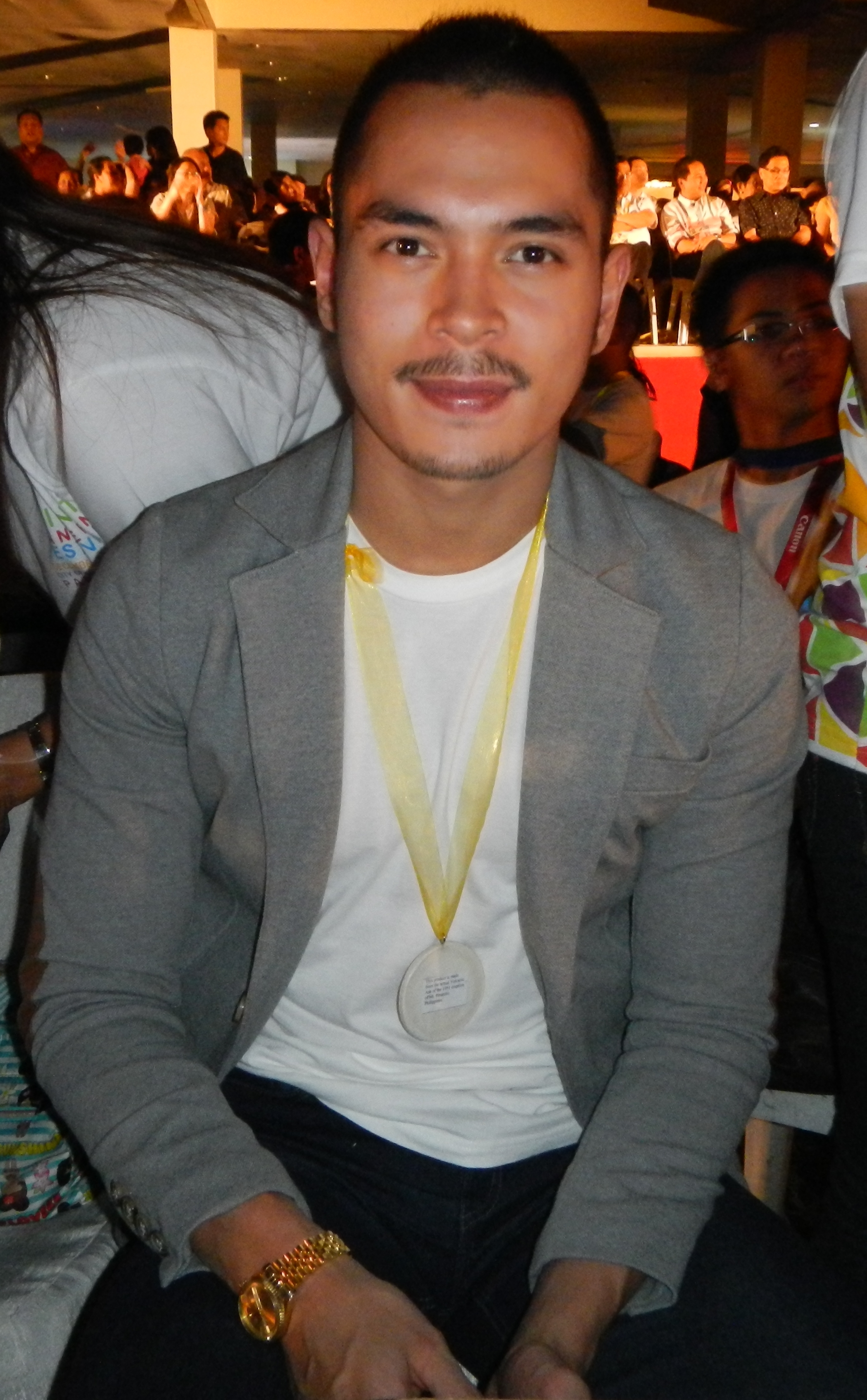
Jake Cuenca portrays Paulino "Paul" Raymundo

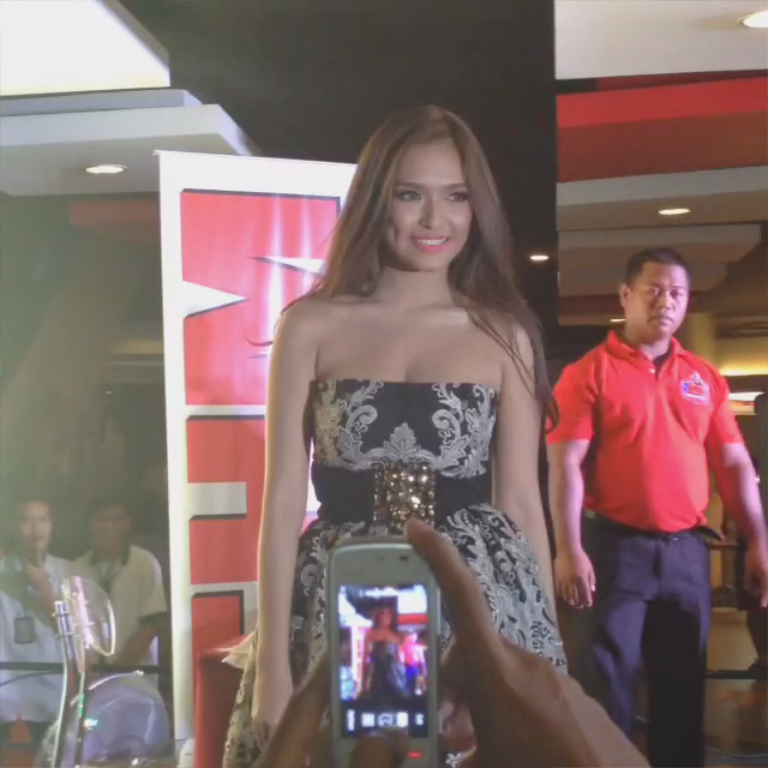
Bangs Garcia portrays Mia Pedroso

=== Main cast ===
- Shaina Magdayao as Sarah Natividad-Raymundo
- Jake Cuenca as Paulino "Paul" Raymundo
- Bangs Garcia as Mia Pedroso†
- Ron Morales as Rino De Dios†

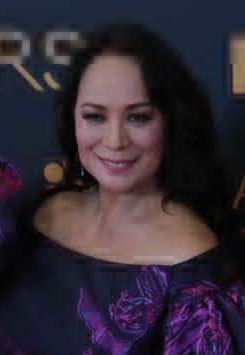
Gloria Diaz portrays Elvie Raymundo

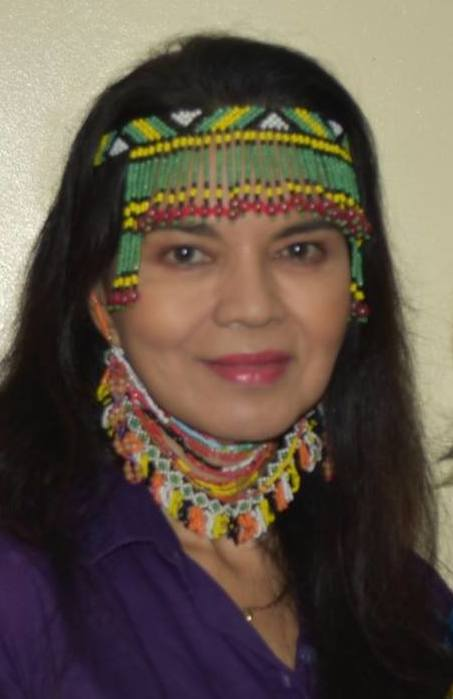
Maria Isabel Lopez portrays Sonia Pedroso

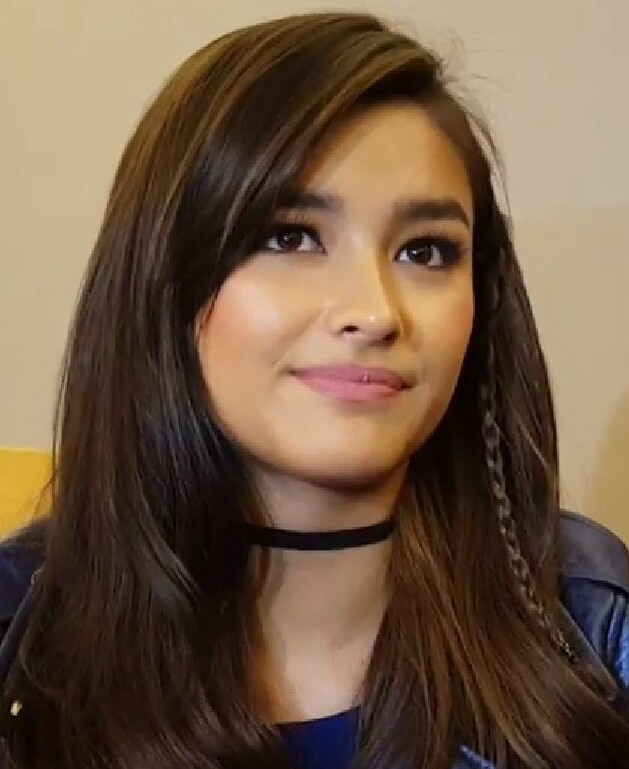
Hope Soberano portrays Claire Raymundo

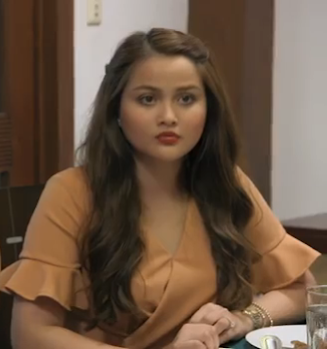
Dianne Medina portrays Sandra

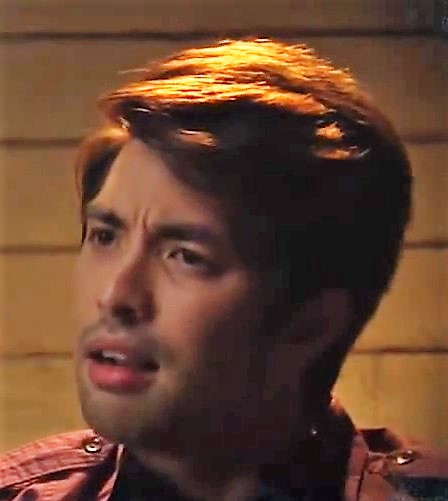
Joross Gamboa portrays Edward Santiago

=== Supporting cast ===
- Sandy Andolong as Belen Natividad
- Gloria Diaz as Elvie Raymundo
- Maria Isabel Lopez as Sonia Pedroso†
- Dick Israel as Arturo "Atoy" Pedroso
- Liza Soberano as Claire Raymundo
- Aaron Junatas as Rap Raymundo
- Nikki Valdez as Joy
- Jojit Lorenzo as George
- Ronnie Lazaro as Cito
- Dianne Medina as Sandra
- Alyanna Angeles as Faith Raymundo
- Jillian Aguila as Macy Raymundo
- Joross Gamboa as Edward Santiago
- Dexie Daulat as Samantha "Sam" Santiago

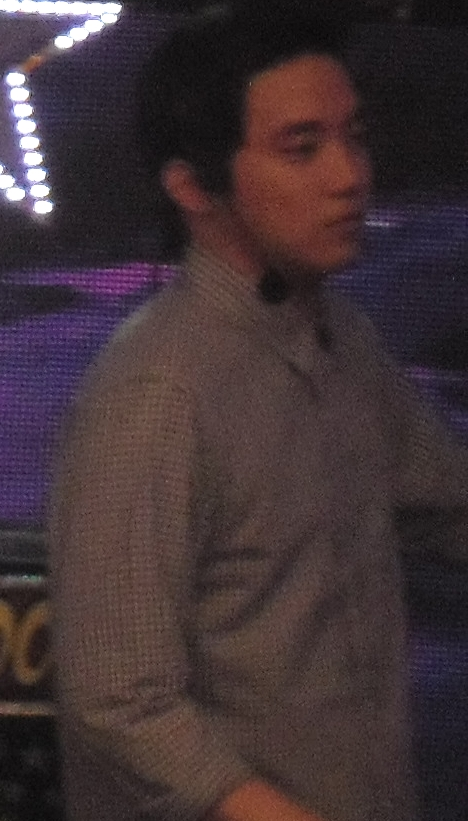
Ryan Bang portrays Leo

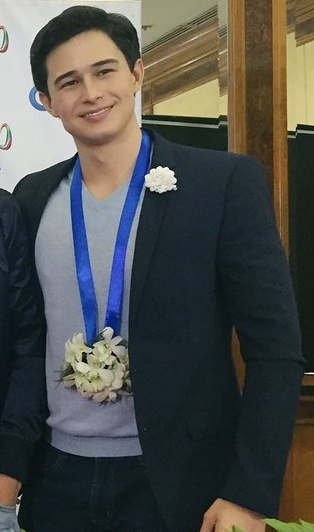
Ivan Dorschner portrays Mark

=== Guest cast ===
- Isay Alvarez as Cynthia Reyes†
- Eva Darren as Almira
- Lui Manansala as Minda
- Nanding Josef as Eddie
- Tiya Pusit as Conchita
- Xavi Hemady as Chris
- Nikki Bagaporo as Karen
- Ryan Bang as Leo
- Ivan Dorschner as Mark
- Johan Santos as Michael
- David Chua as Juan

=== Special participation ===
- Christopher de Leon as Manny Raymundo†
- Phillip Salvador as Roman Natividad†
- Paul Salas as Young Paul Raymundo
- Mariel Pamintuan as Young Sarah Natividad
- Clarence Delgado as Young Rap Raymundo

== International broadcast ==
- Vietnam: TodayTV VTC7 (December 19, 2013, entitled Định mệnh anh và em)

== See also ==
- List of programs broadcast by ABS-CBN
- List of ABS-CBN Studios original drama series
