= Luv U =

2012–16 Philippine television drama series

- Second season title card
- Genre: Teen sitcom School
- Created by: Edgar Mortiz
- Written by: Roderick ″Ricky″ Victoria; Jimmy Sherwin Buenvenida; Josel Garlitos; Joey Gosiengfiao
- Directed by: Edgar Mortiz; Frasco Mortiz; Badjie Mortiz
- Starring: Miles Ocampo; Kiray Celis; Marco Gumabao; Igi Boy Flores; CJ Navato; Alexa Ilacad; Karen Reyes; Mika dela Cruz; Nash Aguas; Angeli Gonzales; Sharlene San Pedro; Sophia Baars; Jairus Aquino; Kobi Vidanes
- Theme music composer: Lito Camo
- Opening theme: "Crush" by T.O.P
- Country of origin: Philippines
- Original language: Tagalog
- No. of seasons: 2
- No. of episodes: 204

Production
- Executive producer: Camille Mortiz-Malapit
- Producer: Raquel Frieda Buenvenida
- Production location: Quezon City
- Editors: Karl Mayshle; Omar Cervantes
- Camera setup: Multi-camera
- Running time: 60 minutes
- Production company: Star Creatives

Original release
- Network: ABS-CBN
- Release: February 19, 2012 – January 17, 2016

Luv U (lit. 'Love You') is a Philippine television teen sitcom series broadcast by ABS-CBN. Directed by Edgar Mortiz, Frasco Mortiz, Badjie Mortiz, it stars Miles Ocampo, Kiray Celis, Marco Gumabao, Igi Boy Flores, CJ Navato, Alexa Ilacad, Karen Reyes, Mika Dela Cruz, Nash Aguas, Angeli Gonzales, Sharlene San Pedro, Sophia Baars, Jairus Aquino and Kobi Vidanes. It aired on the network's Yes Weekend line up from February 19, 2012 to January 17, 2016, replacing Growing Up and was replaced by Celebrity Playtime.

== Overview ==
The series is about lessons in love through the eyes of six teen students of Lamberto Uy Villarama University or LUV U as they experience the highs and lows of being in love at a very young age.

In the first season, the show featured former Goin' Bulilit kids Miles Ocampo, Kiray Celis, CJ Navato and Igi Boy Flores, with singing sensation Rhap Salazar, Angeli Gonzales, and newbie teen actor Marco Gumabao. The group faces dilemmas in their relationships with friends and families as well as at school but together they work together and overcome these.

In the second season, the show featured another group of former Goin' Bulilit kids: Alexa Ilacad, Nash Aguas, Sharlene San Pedro, Jairus Aquino, Mika dela Cruz, Kobi Vidanes, and Sophia Baars as newbies in the fictional university. Some former cast members from the previous season also made a return namely Smokey Manaloto, Bentong and many more. Newly added casts are also added like Eda Nolan and Alora Sasam.

The new season has a more serious tone, it focuses not only on love but also the struggles and dilemmas of modern-day Filipino teenagers face such as bullying, friendship fall-outs, a first break-up, studying difficulties, family acceptance and other real-life high school issues.

First season logo (2012–2013)

== Episodes ==
Season	Episodes	Originally aired	
Season	Episodes	Season Premiere	Season Finale
1	69	February 19, 2012	June 9, 2013
2	135	June 16, 2013	January 17, 2016

== Cast and characters ==
=== Main cast ===
Actor/Actress	Character name	Season(s)	
Actor/Actress	Character name	1	2
Miles Ocampo	Camille Sarmiento	Yes	Yes
Kiray Celis	Whitney Muñoz	Yes	Yes
Angeli Gonzales	April Muñoz	Yes	Yes
Marco Gumabao	Joaquin Bartolome "JB" Arellano	Yes	Yes
Igi Boy Flores	Rocky Dominguez	Yes	Yes
CJ Navato	Boom Enriquez	Yes	Yes
Karen Reyes	Ayen Timbol	Yes	Yes
Alexa Ilacad	Alexis "Lexie" Domingo	No	Yes
Sharlene San Pedro	Shirley Bernardo	No	Yes
Sophia Baars	Patricia "Patty" Cordero	No	Yes
Nash Aguas	Benjamin "Benj" Jalbuena	No	Yes
Jairus Aquino	Frederick "Drake" Lagdameo	No	Yes
Kobi Vidanes	Archie Samonte	No	Yes
Mika Dela Cruz	Marjorie "Marj" De Silva	No	Yes

=== Supporting cast ===
Actor/Actress	Character name	Season(s)	
Actor/Actress	Character name	1	2
Rhap Salazar	Maximillo "Max" Mariano	Yes	Yes
Alfred Labatos	Fredo Cuenca	Yes	Yes
Vanjo Cuenca	Banjo Labatos	Yes	Yes
Arie Reyes	Honey Marasigan	Yes	No
Tippy Dos Santos	Paris delos Santos	Yes	No
Ryan Boyce	Roy Roman	Yes	No
Michelle Vito	Viv Samonte	No	Yes
Smokey Manaloto	Principal Spencer "P.S."	Yes	Yes
Cai Cortez	Ms. Becky Belo	Yes	Yes
Bangs Garcia	Ms. Jessica Casimsiman	Yes	No
Eda Nolan	Ms. Bettina "Betty" Ramos	No	Yes
Hyubs Azarcon	Mang Ariel	Yes	Yes
Bentong†	Mang Jules	Yes	Yes
Joy Viado†	Lola Paula	Yes	Yes
Alora Sasam	Judilyn Sanchez	No	Yes
Dominic Ochoa	Nicanor "Nick" Jalbuena	No	Yes
Paul Salas	Thirdy Villarama	No	Yes
Zonia Ysabel Mejia	Mercedes "Cedes" Advincula	No	Yes

=== Guest cast ===
- Ella Cruz as Mariana
- Ivan Dorschner as Evan "Tisoy" Escence
- Liza Soberano as Pia
- Trina Legaspi as Ali
- Mikylla Ramirez as Michelle
- Kean Cipriano as himself
- Michael Pangilinan as himself/Singer of Pare Mahal Mo Raw Ako on Max and JB scene
- Francis Magundayao as Andrew Ford Pineda
- Joshua Garcia as Dionard
- Loisa Andalio as Cheska
- Arvic Rivero as Bryan
- Atoy Co as Coach Totoy Co
- Mimi Aringo as Ms. Francine Fajardo
- Thou Reyes as Director
- Karen Dematera as Yaya
- Dominic Roque as Joel Velasquez
- Jane Oineza as Joey
- John Manalo as Jim
- Marissa Sanchez as Melanie Bernardo
- Maricar Reyes as Olive Jalbuena
- Rachel Anne Daquis as Herself
- Michele Gumabao as Herself
- Pamu Pamorada as Nanetta
- Manolo Pedrosa as Jasper Fernandez
- Precious Lara Quigaman as Lisa Domingo
- Ana Roces as Jennifer Sevillamayor
- Stefan Alino as Matteo
- Elisse Joson as Divine
- Karen Bordador as Nikita Ponti
- Grae Fernandez as Carter
- Mutya Johanna Datul as Dina Binibini
- Viveika Ravanes as Madam Amor
- Cheena Crab as Charley Mariquit (crossover in the film Etiquette for Mistresses)
- Devy Amor as Devy
- Richard Gomez
- Sofia Andres as Bea Tipol
- Rhed Bustamante as Liza Maristela (crossover in the TV series FlordeLiza)
- Carlos Maceda as Liza's father (His character appearance was similar to Gener in FlordeLiza)
- Iza Calzado
- Mary Jean Lastimosa as Ms. MJ
- Myrtle Sarrosa as Krista
- JV Kapunan as Charlie
- Emman Nimedez† as Emman Abenida

== Casting ==
In Season 2, Mika Dela Cruz (who portrayed as Majorie De Silva) left the show after the episode aired on October 20, 2013 due to taping schedules of the upcoming teleserye Mirabella, where she is part of the main cast. In 2015, Sharlene San Pedro (who portrayed as Shirley Bernardo) was absent in some episodes due to taping schedules for Nathaniel, where she is cast with co-star Jairus Aquino.

== Accolades ==
Year	Award	Category	Result
2012	PMPC Star Awards for Television	Best Youth-Oriented Program	Won
2013	PMPC Star Awards for Television	Best Youth-Oriented Program	Won
2014	PMPC Star Awards for Television	Best Youth-Oriented Program	Won
2015	PMPC Star Awards for Television	Best Comedy Program	Nominated
