= Palos (TV series) =

- Title card
- Also known as: The Professionals
- Genre: Drama; Action; Thriller
- Created by: ABS-CBN Studios
- Based on: Alyas Palos (1961) by Tony Santos
- Developed by: ABS-CBN Studios; Rondel Lindayag
- Written by: Galo T. Ador Jr.; Danica Mae Domingo
- Directed by: Toto S. Natividad; Erick C. Salud; Trina N. Dayrit
- Starring: Cesar Montano; Jake Cuenca
- Theme music composer: Jay Durias
- Opening theme: Palos theme
- Ending theme: "Langit sa 'Yong Tabi" by South Border
- Country of origin: Philippines
- Original language: Filipino
- No. of episodes: 63

Production
- Executive producers: Roldeo T. Endrinal; Rocky B. Ubana
- Running time: 27–31 minutes
- Production company: Dreamscape Entertainment Television

Original release
- Network: ABS-CBN
- Release: January 28 – April 25, 2008

Palos (lit. 'Eel', international title: The Professionals) is a 2008 Philippine television drama action series broadcast by ABS-CBN. Based on a 1961 Philippine film of Alyas Palos. Directed by Toto S. Natividad, Erick C. Salud and Trina N. Dayrit, it stars Cesar Montano and Jake Cuenca. It aired on the network's Primetime Bida line up and worldwide on TFC from January 28 to April 25, 2008, replacing Ysabella and was replaced by Maligno.

The series is streaming online on YouTube.

== Origins ==
=== Comics ===
The first film's poster.

Alyas Palos (Alias Eel) is a comic serial novel by Virgilio and Nestor Redondo, which was first serialized in Tagalog Klasiks in 1961. The title character was a thief and a kind-hearted felon with exceptional safe-cracking skills.

=== Premise ===
The story begins when Giancarlo is orphaned at a young age when his mother, Grazella, is killed in a shooting incident in Macau. He blames his mother's death on an agent known only as "Palos", and vows to do whatever it takes to avenge her death.

== Cast and characters ==
=== Lead cast ===
==== Protagonist ====
- Cesar Montano as Fabio Cassimir / Palos
- Jake Cuenca as Giancarlo Caranzo / New Palos

==== Antagonist ====
- Jomari Yllana as Neptune Director Alessandro Canavarro
- Jodi Sta. Maria-Lacson as Carmela Canavarro

==== Main cast ====
- Roxanne Guinoo as Anna
- Bangs Garcia as Sylvia Nazi
- Wendy Valdez as Nicolla
- Jay-R Siaboc as Enzo Picaso
- Carla Humphries as Dr. Stella Guidotti
- Regine Angeles as Paola Durante
- Ron Morales as Aldo Mussolini
- Redford White as Mario
- Dennis Padilla as Luigi
- Vandolph Quizon as Giuseppe
- Julia Barretto as Pamela Kiev
- Gloria Romero as Alfonsina Riviera

=== Supporting and guest cast ===
- Sunshine Cruz as Grazella R. Caranzo
- Bernard Bonnin as Gen. Vittorio Canavarro
- Albert Martinez as Salvatore
- Al Tantay as Ernesto Mario
- Ricardo Cepeda
- Desiree del Valle as Arianna Kiev
- Allan Paule
- Lovely Rivero
- Ping Medina
- Joshua Dionisio as Young Giancarlo
- Mariel Rodriguez as Viola
- Epi Quizon as Marco Ferreli
- Charles Christianson
- Emilio Garcia
- Helga Krapf
- Aiko Melendez as Cong. Soledad Canavarro
- Railey Valeroso as Pietro Avelino
- Butz Aquino as President Donatello Guidotti
- Ramon Christopher as Antonino Morato
- Michael Conan as Ivan Kiev
- Timothy Lambert Chan as Franco Canavarro
- JB Magsaysay as Dr. Samuel Chan
- Mico Palanca as Kim Yung Joo
- AJ Dee as Watashi Kim
- Bruce Quebral as Luciano
- Riza Santos as Lady Simona
- Christian Vasquez as Young General Vittorio Canavarro
- John Manalo as Young Fabio
- Marlo Sanchez
- Joem Mercurio
- CJ Jaravata
- Janelle So
- Mike Magat
- Angellie Urquico as young Sylvia
- Angeli Gonzales as Young Anna
- Rheena Villamor as herself

== See also ==
- List of programs broadcast by ABS-CBN
