= Bulong (film) =

2011 comedy horror film by Chito S. Roño

- Theatrical release poster
- Directed by: Chito S. Roño
- Screenplay by: Roy C. Iglesias
- Story by: Chito S. Roño; Roy C. Iglesias
- Produced by: Elma S. Medua
- Starring: Vhong Navarro; Angelica Panganiban
- Cinematography: Gary L. Gardoce
- Edited by: Vito Cajili
- Music by: Carmina Cuya
- Production company: Star Cinema
- Distributed by: Star Cinema
- Release date: February 2, 2011
- Running time: 105 minutes
- Country: Philippines
- Language: Filipino

Bulong (lit. 'Whisper') is a 2011 Filipino comedy horror film directed by Chito S. Roño from an original story concept he co-developed with Roy C. Iglesias, who solely wrote the screenplay. Starring Angelica Panganiban and Vhong Navarro in their first film as the lead stars, the film revolves around a brokenhearted nurse who seeks help from the deceased to find a girlfriend he wanted. It also stars Angie Ferro, Bangs Garcia, Sylvia Sanchez, and Jon Avila.

Produced and released by Star Cinema, the film was theatrically released on February 2, 2011.

== Plot ==
Conan, a nurse, wants to gain the heart of his colleague Ellen and asks his friend how to achieve his wish. His friend tells him of a legend that says that if one whispers his/her wish to a dead body, the soul of the deceased will help them. He then seeks the help of his other friend, Oprah, who is a niece of a soothsayer. He whispers to a corpse his wish that Ellen would fall in love with him, but finds out that the deceased went deaf before it expired. Conan goes home in disappointment as an old woman is hit by a car nearby. He rushes to her corpse to whisper his wish.

The next day, while at work, Conan is flirted with by Ellen, and it seems that his wish had worked. But suddenly, the old woman begins to haunt him by possessing Ellen and leaves vague hints, leading to his suspension from work when his attempts to fend off the ghost are misunderstood as sexual harassment. Conan seeks the help of Oprah, who agrees in exchange for monetary compensation. When Conan pays Oprah, the bill includes a piece of paper with a demonic ram's head on it. In horror, Oprah concludes that they must seek her aunt's help. Oprah's aunt reveals that the old woman Conan met was a witch named Paula who wanted to ask forgiveness of her granddaughter Lala after unknowingly cursing her on behalf of a client. She needs Conan to make her drink a potion that is made out of holy water and Paula's finger to repel the curse. She also warns that demons will attempt to stop the resolution of the request, having claimed the lives of Paula's clients.

Conan and Oprah travel to Bohol, where Lala lives. Throughout their journey, they survive attacks by people possessed by demons. When the two arrive at Lala's house, a centipede-like demon attacks them until Lala drinks the liquid and breaks the curse that was cast upon her, destroying the demon. Paula stops haunting Conan but hits him one last time with a book after joking about her death.

Conan returns to work afterward and reunites with Ellen, who has no memories of her possession, and finds out that she's resigning to work abroad. Conan, wishing Ellen luck, as friends introduce to her to Oprah. Later, while going on a date with Oprah along Manila Bay, Conan and Oprah witness two shooting stars come by, and Conan finally says his wish: for Oprah to become his girlfriend. An old woman, who resembles Paula, approaches, stating that her wish is to find her twin, with both Oprah and Conan running away in terror.

== Cast ==
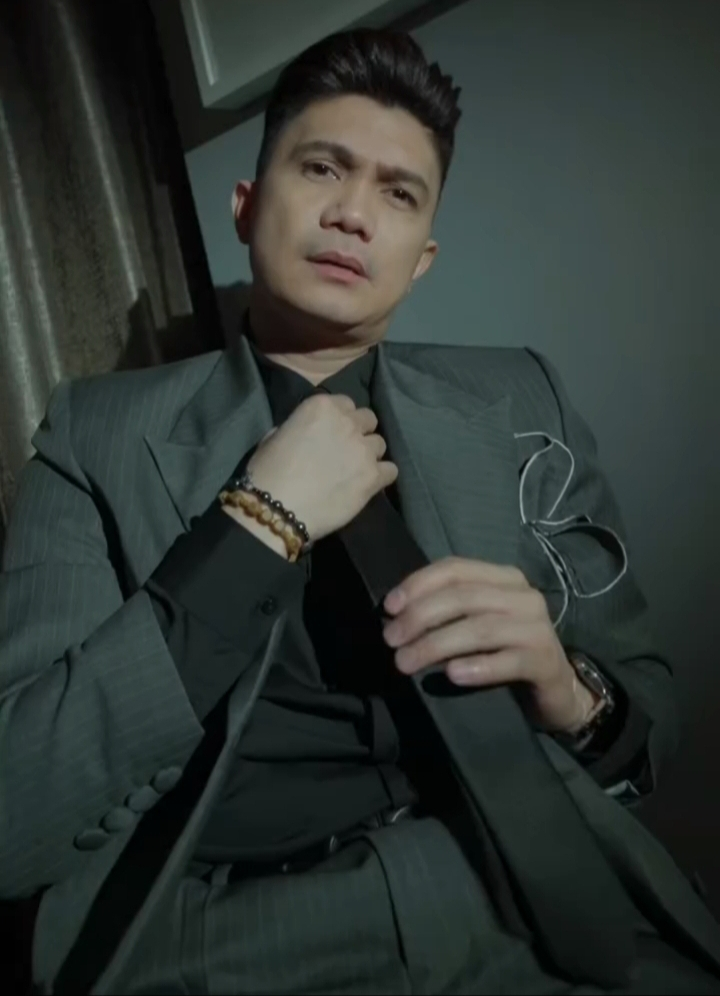
Vhong Navarro portrays Conan

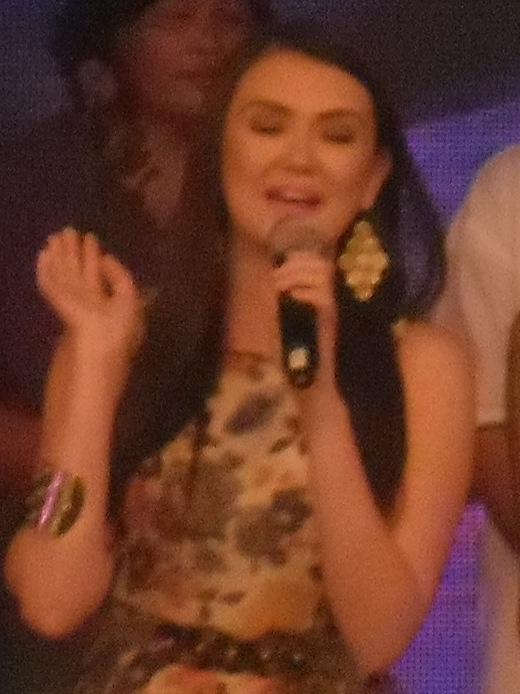
Angelica Panganiban portrays Oprah

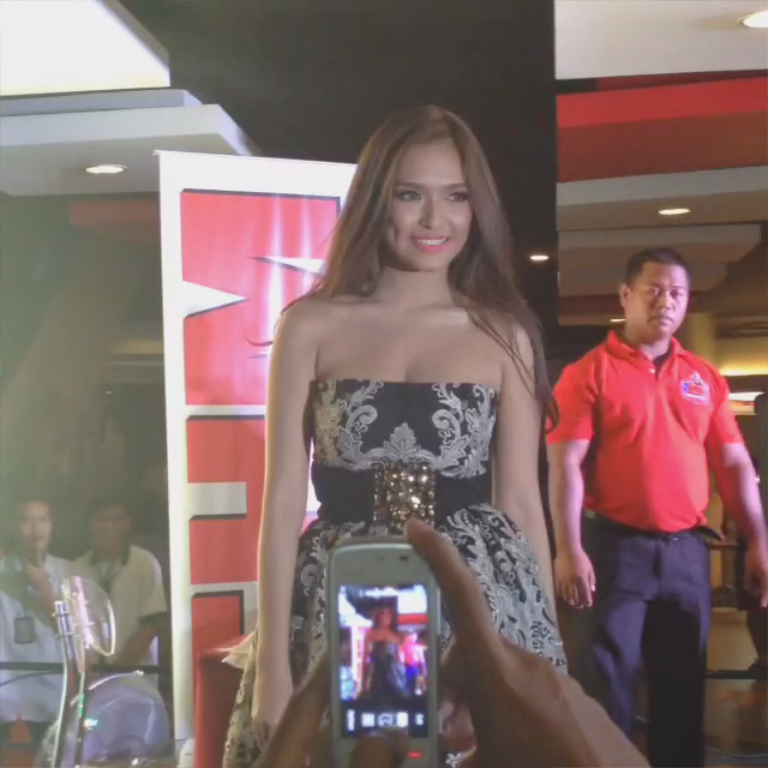
Bangs Garcia portrays Ellen

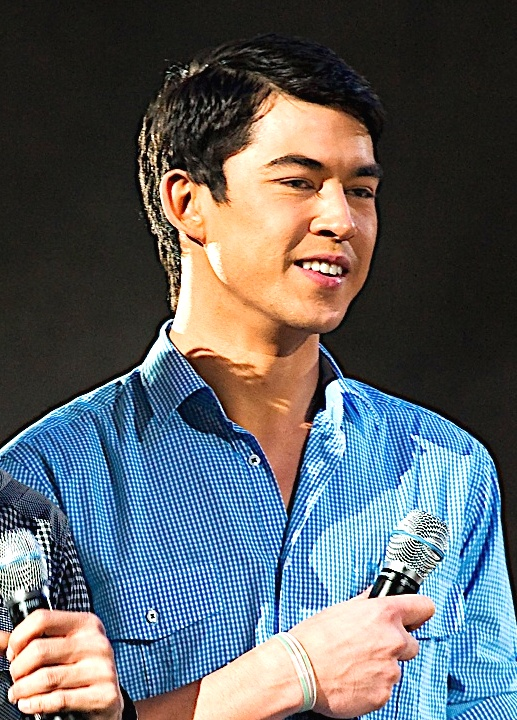
Jon Avila portrays as Dr. Randy

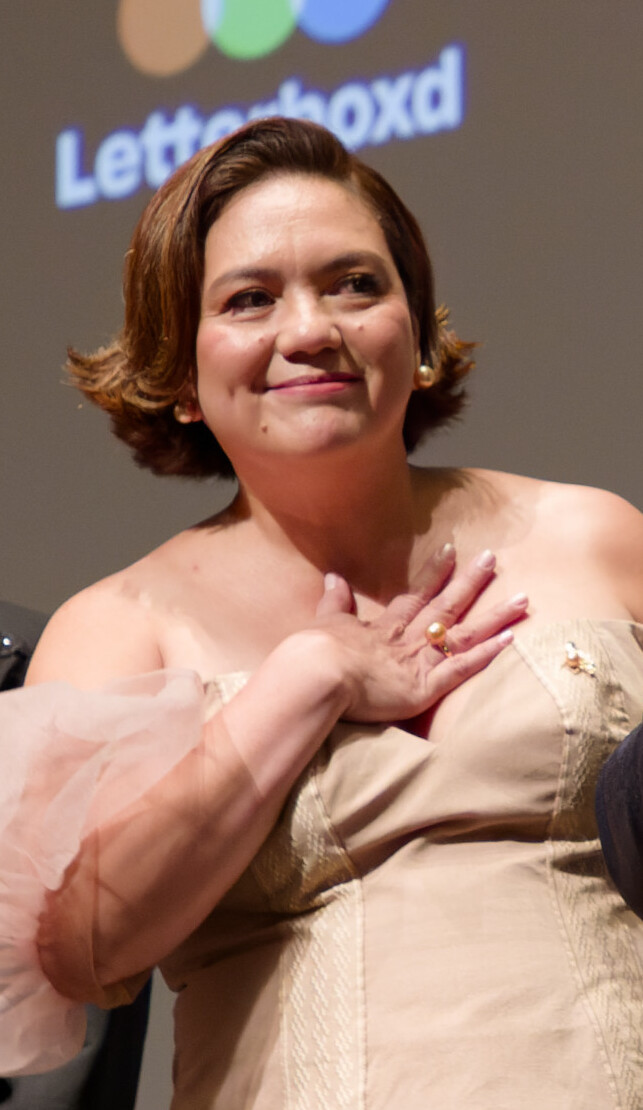
Sylvia Sanchez portrays as Lili

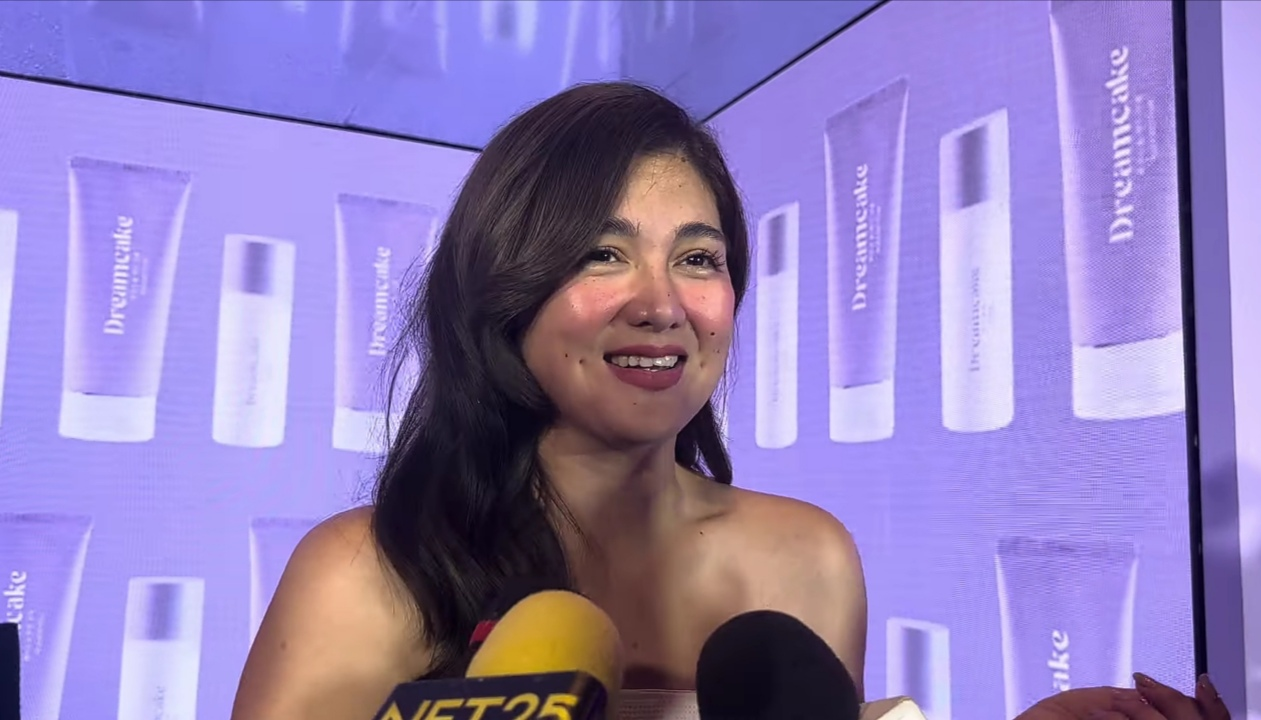
Dimples Romana portrays as Chelsea

- Vhong Navarro as Conan
- Angelica Panganiban as Oprah
- Bangs Garcia as Ellen
- Jon Avila as Dr. Randy
- Eda Nolan as Fatima
- Ruben Gonzaga as Simon
- Neri Naig as Lala
- Teddy Corpuz as Donald
- Sylvia Sanchez as Lili
- Carl John Barrameda as Fatima's brother
- Joy Viado† as Aunt Tyra
- Angie Ferro† as Lola Paula
- Carme Sanchez as Madame Kara
- Mel Kimura as Fake Kumadrona
- Mosang as Morette
- Dimples Romana as Chelsea

== Production ==
Director Rono started working on the movie in October 2010.

== Soundtrack ==
"Superhero" by Teddy Corpuz of Rocksteddy

== Reception ==
Nikki delos Santos of ABS-CBN News complemented the movie's script, characters and execution but criticized the computer-generated demon's realness. Elvin Luciano of the Philippine Entertainment Portal describes the movie as a "feel good horror movie" which might not cater to horror fans.

The film is one of the highest-grossing Philippine films in 2011 earning an estimated $1,541,139 in the domestic market.

== See also ==
- List of ghost films
