= Katorse =

2009–10 Philippine television drama series

- Title card
- Also known as: 14
- Genre: Teen drama; romance
- Created by: ABS-CBN Studios; Rondel P. Lindayag; Regal Films
- Based on: Katorse by Joey Gosiengfiao
- Developed by: ABS-CBN Studios; Roldeo T. Endrinal; Julie Anne R. Benitez
- Written by: Noreen Capili; Ruby Leah Castro; Philip King; Siegfred Sanchez; Mariami Tanangco-Domingo
- Directed by: Malu L. Sevilla
- Starring: Erich Gonzales; Ejay Falcon; Xian Lim; Enchong Dee
- Theme music composer: Tina Paner
- Opening theme: "Tamis ng Unang Halik" by Juris Fernandez
- Composer: Mon Del Rosario
- Country of origin: Philippines
- Original language: Filipino
- No. of episodes: 100

Production
- Executive producers: Carlo Katigbak; Cory Vidanes; Laurenti Dyogi; Roldeo Endrinal
- Producers: Jennifer Soliman-Bolilan; Darnel Joy R. Villaflor
- Production locations: Metro Manila; Pampanga; Balayan, Batangas
- Running time: 30-45 minutes
- Production company: Dreamscape Entertainment Television

Original release
- Network: ABS-CBN
- Release: August 24, 2009 – January 8, 2010

Katorse (International title: Fourteen (14)) is a Philippine television drama romance series broadcast by ABS-CBN. The series is based on a 1980 Philippine film of the same title. Directed by Malu L. Sevilla, it stars Erich Gonzales, Ejay Falcon, Xian Lim and Enchong Dee. It aired on the network's Primetime Bida line up and worldwide on TFC from August 24, 2009 to January 8, 2010, replacing Boys Over Flowers and was replaced by Tanging Yaman. It tells the story of a simple small-town girl who fell in love with a childhood friend who later fathers a child with her.

== Overview ==
=== Casting ===
The show stars 2005 Star Circle Grand Questor Erich Gonzales as teenage mom, Nene. This is Gonzales' first starring role in a primetime program. The series showcases showbiz newbies Ejay Falcon and Xian Lim in their first starring role in a primetime series. ABS-CBN picked the cast because they believe that primetime television needs to have new faces, to make it look fresh and better than the usual actors.

In early July 2009, ABS-CBN released the program's trailer, which revealed the cast of Katorse to include veteran actors Malou de Guzman (as Nene's mother) and Cherie Gil as Gabby's mother, where she plays a less villainous role. Cherie Gil and Erich Gonzales had worked together in Pieta. Gil saw a lot of potential with Erich and believes that she will go far in the showbiz industry.

Sometime in August 2009, the management added Enchong Dee as an additional main cast.

=== 1968 film ===
The original Katorse starred 18-year-old Mercedes Galvez, which launched her to stardom in the late 1960s, and featured Gabby Concepcion as Gabby and the late Alfie Anido as Albert. Katorse is known for its sexy trademark "magic kamison" (magic chemise) donned by the young lead actress while out for a swim. Although there are only two male characters in the 1968 film, ABS-CBN management added a third character, played by Enchong Dee, in the television series. The film was remade in 1980 starring Dina Bonnevie.

== Story and development ==
=== Synopsis ===
Nene is an ordinary girl from the province whose once-happy childhood turns fatally tragic as she and her wealthy childhood friend Gabby supposedly fell in love, thus causing her teenage pregnancy when they have sexual intercourse. Nene also discovers many troubles involving her family.

== Cast and characters ==
=== Main cast ===
- Erich Gonzales as Elena "Nene" Reyes-Wenceslao
- Ejay Falcon as Gabriel "Gabby" Arcanghel
- Enchong Dee as John Joseph "Jojo" M. Wenceslao
- Xian Lim as Albert Arcanghel

=== Supporting cast ===
- Gardo Versoza as Don Anselmo Arcanghel
- Cherie Gil as Doña Margarita Arcanghel
- Malou de Guzman as Nena Reyes
- Eda Nolan as Nenita Reyes
- Charee Pineda as Marissa Ocampo
- Carmi Martin as Yvonne Madrigal-Wenceslao
- Jessy Mendiola as Bettina Godinez
- Mat Ranillo III as Alfred Wenceslao
- Bangs Garcia as Shakira
- Dino Imperial as Dilbert
- Cy Mistosamente as Tommy Reyes-Wenceslao

=== Guest cast ===
- Jane Oineza as young Nene
- John Manalo as young Gabriel
- Joshua Dionisio as young Albert
- Jhoana Marie Tan as Doray
- Tommy Abuel as Mr. King
- Alexis Socorro L. Reyes as Dra. Julie
- Maritess Joaquin as Theresa Ocampo
- Martin del Rosario as Macoy
- Kier Legaspi as Ramon
- Emily Loren as Guidance Principal
- Julia Montes as Nellie
- Auriette Divina as Mayumi Crisostomo
- Michael "Jamike" Jarin as Dr. Castro
- Marvin Yap as Maynard
- Juan Rodrigo as Paeng Reyes
- Marissa Delgado as Doña Remedios Madrigal

== Reception ==
=== Soundtrack ===
The program's theme song, especially for Gabby and Nene, is "Tamis ng Unang Halik" ("Sweetness of First Kiss") sung by Juris of MYMP originally done by Kristina Paner. The song "My Love is Here" sung by Erik Santos is also featured in the show as a theme for Jojo and Nene.

=== Postponement ===
The show was originally scheduled to air in early June 8, 2009, but was postponed as the producers reported having encountered shooting problems because of the weather. Because of this, the management decided to replace Katorse's initial timeslot with The Wedding, a romantic-comedy series starring Anne Curtis, Derek Ramsay and Zanjoe Marudo.

=== Teenage pregnancy issue ===
MTRCB raised concerns due to the show's theme of teenage pregnancy, claiming that it could easily influence viewers. They also referred to The Wedding, another program by ABS-CBN in which the character of Hiyasmin Neri was impregnated at a young age.

== International release ==
Country/Region	Network(s)	Series premiere	Series Title in Country
Malaysia	Astro Prima	April 26, 2010	Fourteen
Singapore	Channel 5	December 7, 2010	Fourteen

== See also ==
- List of programs broadcast by ABS-CBN
- List of ABS-CBN Studios original drama series
