= Little Big Star =

- Genre: Reality competition
- Presented by: Sarah Geronimo
- Country of origin: Philippines
- Original language: Filipino
- No. of episodes: 71

Production
- Running time: 60 minutes

Original release
- Network: ABS-CBN
- Release: September 24, 2005 – February 3, 2007

Little Big Star is a Philippine television reality competition show broadcast by ABS-CBN. Hosted by Sarah Geronimo, it aired on the network's Saturday afternoon line up from September 24, 2005, to February 3, 2007, replacing Hoy Gising! Kapamilya and was replaced by Little Big Superstar. The show features aspiring young singers who battle it out each week to become the next Little Big Star.

The "Little Big Star" competition is divided into two "divisions"; the Little Division for contestants ages six to nine years old and the Big Division with contestants ages 10 to 13 years old.

== Hosts ==
=== Sarah Geronimo ===
Sarah Geronimo heads the nationwide broadcast of Little Big Star. In Little Big Star Manila, finalists from the regional shows are sent to battle in the grand finals.

Sarah herself won a singing competition, IBC's Star for a Night.

=== Sheryn Regis ===
Sheryn Regis is the host of Little Big Star Cebu, aired on ABS-CBN Cebu. LBS Cebu was recognized as the fourth top-rating show in ABS-CBN's Nationwide Charts.

Sheryn won 1st runner-up in Star in a Million back in 2004.

=== Nikki Bacolod ===
Nikki Bacolod is the face and voice behind Little Big Star Davao, airing on ABS-CBN Davao. Nikki placed 2nd to Jerome Sala in Search for the Star in a Million (Season 2), which coincidentally, Sarah was also hosting with her co-champions.

== Season one ==
In the first season, contestants competed each week to become part of the Honor Roll. Those in the Honor Roll at the end of the month would compete in the Monthly Finals for the title of "Star of the Month." The "Star of the Month" would secure a spot in the finals.

=== Little Star TOP 25 ===
- Rhap Salazar
- Makisig Morales
- Kyle Balili
- Sam Concepcion
- Micah Torre
- Randy De Silva
- Jaya Sto. Domingo
- Shane Velasco
- Charice Pempengco (now Jake Zyrus)
- Katrina Velarde
- Nicole Marasigan
- Andrea Mendoza
- Kiara Dominante
- Ulta Medsar Oroña
- Leo Padilla
- Mark Venzon Madriaga
- Shane Gonzales
- Ralph Morris
- Christian Leroi
- Mackenzie De Guzman
- Clarence Torres
- Mico Dela Pena
- Nikka Del Valle
- Ciara Santos
- Alexander Gomez
- Tricia Delos Santos
- Jhonifer Alvaire Cruz
- Andrew Mariano
- Lorenz Sarrondo

=== Little Division Grand Finalists ===
- Rhap Salazar – Brightest Star
- Makisig Morales – 2nd Honor
- Kyle Balili – 3rd Honor
- Micah Torre – 4th Honor
- Nic Jim Oliver – 5th Honor
- Jaya Sto. Domingo – 6th Honor
- Shane Velasco – 7th Honor

=== Big Division Grand Finalists ===
- Sam Concepcion – Brightest Star
- Gian Barbarona – 2nd Honor
- Charice Pempengco – 3rd Honor
- Rachel Pegason – 4th Honor
- Ronald Humarang – 5th Honor
- Carl Camo – 6th Honor
- Melvin Rimas – 7th Honor

== Season two ==
Season 2 began the week after the grand finals of season 1. After a little over two months of competition, ABS-CBN pulled the plug on the series after experiencing a decline in ratings as well as the network focusing on its new talent search, Pinoy Dream Academy. The season 2 grand finals aired on Saturday, July 1, 2006.

=== Little Division Grand Finalists ===
- Robert Villar – Brightest Star
- Christian Rico B. Olog – 2nd Honor

=== Big Division Grand Finalists ===
- Angellie Urquico (now Anja Aguilar) – Brightest Star
- Krisshajene "Khrissha" Viaje – 2nd Honor
- Dawn Amber Cortes – 3rd Honor
- Rafael Canillas – 4th Honor
- Laurice Bermillo – 5th Honor

== After Little Big Star ==
A few of the first-season contestants have gone on to other projects at ABS-CBN. Both Sam Concepcion and Makisig Morales were offered lead roles in the network's newest fantaserye, Super Inggo, long before the finals even began. Meanwhile, Micah Torre was cast in host Sarah Geronimo's new soap opera Bituing Walang Ningning. Season 2's Robert Villar starred as Berto on Calla Lily, while Micah Torre and Kyle Balili sang the theme song for that soap opera. Villar is the only contestant who transferred from ABS-CBN to GMA Network. The other finalists have performed on the 2nd season of "Little Big Star" and a few other ABS-CBN programs. Kyle Balili appeared in the new soap opera Sana Maulit Muli.

Charice Pempengco has also made a name for herself worldwide with her performances that were shown on YouTube. She has made appearances in The Ellen DeGeneres Show, The Oprah Winfrey Show, The Paul O'Grady Show, Good Morning America, and the Macy's Thanksgiving Day Parade. She has also shared the spotlight with the likes of Josh Groban, Celine Dion and Andrea Bocelli, just to name a few. She released her self-titled international album CHARICE under the guidance of her mentor, David Foster. Her album made it to the #8 spot on the US Billboard chart, making her the first Asian artist in history to make it to the Billboard Top Ten. In June 2010, it was announced that Charice landed a recurring guest role in the hit Fox TV series Glee.

Other finalists who appeared in Little Big Star are also participating in various local reality shows and talent searches. A reality talent search on TV5 called Star Factor. These include Krissha Viaje (who finished second place in the second season of Little Big Star) who finished seventh. Morissette (who was a finalist in Little Big Star Cebu) made it to second place in Star Factor, and years later went on to be a semi-finalist in the first season of The Voice Of The Philippines.

On the other hand, former Big Division contestants of the first season Alyssa Kate Quijano, Jennifer Maravilla, and Katrina Velarde formed a singing trio called New Born Divas where they made it to the grand finals of the second season of Talentadong Pinoy in TV5. In 2010, Alyssa Quijano has crowned the winner of the teen category of Karaoke Next Level Under Worlds of fun. Later on, Alyssa Kate Quijano and Katrina Velarde joined the first season of the X-Factor Philippines and formed a group there called AKA JAM and later placed 10th.

Also, Laurice Bermillo (fourth place in Little Big Star Season 2) made it as a contender in Star Power and finished 9th. and Akiko Solon (a monthly finalist in Little Big Star Cebu) who finished 5th in the said singing contest.

Angellie Urquico, the winner of little big star season 2 big division, later signed a contract with ABS-CBN's ASAP under her new screen name Anja Aguilar.

== Releases ==
Album	Date of release	Track Listing	Note
Little Big Star	May 2006 Star Records	1. "Kaba" - Makisig Morales; 2. "Kay Palad Mo" - Rhap Salazar; 3. "Mr. Kupido" - Micah Torre; 4. "Iingatan Ka" - Kyle Balili; 5. "Sa Kandungan Mo" - Jaya Sto.Domingo; 6. "Ako Ang Bukas" - Shanne Velasco; 7. "Follow Your Dreams" - Gian Barbarona; 8. "I'll Be There" - Charice Pempengco; 9. "Pasulyap-sulyap" - Rachel Pegason; 10. "Tara Tena" - Sam Concepcion; 11. "Meron Ba" - Melvin Rimas; 12. "Till It's Time" - Randy de Silva; 13. "Iisa Lang Tayo" - Ronald Humarang; 14. "May Bukas Pa" - Carl Camo	2 discs Disc One: Music CD; Disc Two: VCD with music videos

== See also ==
- Little Big Superstar
- List of programs broadcast by ABS-CBN
