= Rhap Salazar =

Filipino singer and former child actor (born 1997)

- Born: Rhap Sajul Salazar; February 3, 1997 (age 29); Pinamalayan, Oriental Mindoro, Philippines
- Genres: Action, Fantasy, Drama, Comedy, Horror
- Occupations: Singer-songwriter, actor
- Years active: 2004–present
- Labels: Star Music (2004–2014); Star Magic (2004–2014)
- Formerly of: Mak and the Dudes

Rhap Salazar (born February 3, 1997) is a Filipino singer, live-streamer, and actor. He is known for his live performances and referred to as "The Sam Smith of the Philippines". Fluent in both English and Filipino, Rhap grew up in Pinamalayan, before relocating to Metro Manila to pursue a career in the entertainment industry. He is most recognized for his role of Max in ABS-CBN's Luv U and his appearances on It's Showtime. In his music career, Rhap draws inspiration from Sam Smith, Ben Platt, Beyoncé, and Whitney Houston. His original songs include "Barely Breathing" (2022) and "Won't Change" (2023). He is also known for his live-stream performances and his recent entrance into musical theater.

== Career ==
In 2005, Rhap appeared on Little Big Star, alongside host Sarah Geronimo. Rhap won first place in the Little Division Grand Finalists at the age of 8.

In 2007, he started acting, joining the cast of Kokey and the movie Pasukob.

In 2008, he had movie roles in SupahPapalicious, Ikaw pa rin: Bongga ka Boy, and Maalaala Mo Kaya.

In 2009, Rhap was selected to perform "Galing ng Pinoy" by Western Union, a song dedicated to Overseas Filipino Workers (OFWs). In the same year, he represented the Philippines at the 13th World Championships of Performing Arts (WCOPA) in Los Angeles. He led the Philippine delegation at the grand parade of nations and went on to become the third consecutive Filipino to earn the coveted title, Junior Grand Champion Performer of the World. He also won Junior Grand Champion Solo Vocalist of the World. Apart from taking home top honors, Rhap won five gold medals in World Championships of Performing Arts’ junior division, in the vocal categories of Broadway, gospel, open, pop, and R&B. He appeared on The Ellen DeGeneres Show later that year at the age of 12.

In 2010, Rhap received the “Ani ng Dangal” award from President Arroyo in a simple ceremony held at the Malacañang Palace. A total of 41 artists in various fields were recognized with trophies sculpted by national artist Abdul Imam. That same year, Rhap tied for first place in the 2010 Awit Awards in the category “Best Performance by a New Male Recording Artist" He also starred in the movie Father Jejemon at the age of 13.

A year later, Rhap was invited to perform at Cebu Institute of Technology - University to serenade contestants in Lakambini 2011. In the same year, he performed at the Waterfront Cebu Hotel.

In 2012, Rhap landed his most iconic role to date as Maximilio Mariano in the TV series Luv U. Rhap performed alongside Jake Zyrus and Iyaz at the Waterfront Cebu Hotel with Little Big Star alumni Sam Concepcion, Makisig Morales, Kyle Balili, and Gian Barbarona.

In 2013, Rhap joined his Luv U castmates to celebrate the centennial of Pasig Catholic College. Later that year, Rhap performed at the Tacloban City Convention Center to a sold out venue of 4,500 fans.

In 2014, he joined the cast for 1 episode of the Filipino TV series, Ipaglaban mo.

In 2015, Rhap partnered with four other former WCOPA medalists and winners to form the group 5thGen. Aside from Rhap (who competed in 2009), the members include Rose Marielle Mamaclay, Reymond Sajor, Reydan "RJ" Buenagua, and Lady Dayana Onnagan. Under 5thGen, the group released their hit song, “Contagious”, performing it on the Wish Bus (part of Wish 107.5 FM).

5thGen performed at EuroPop 2016 Gala Night held in Berlin, Germany.

In 2017, Rhap performed his single “Now or Never” live at YouTube’s FanFest event in Manila. Later that same year, a student asked him via Twitter if he would sing at their Science Summit Camp. He surprised the students at City of Mandaluyong Science High School with a live performance during their acoustic night.

In May 2019, Rhap performed Calum Scott's "You Are The Reason" at LoveYourself's “Love Gala: Courage Amplified” fundraiser. Love Gala 2019 was a charity event supporting HIV awareness and education. The event was held in Quezon City. Later that year, Rhap became a finalist on It's Showtime's singing competition, Tawag ng Tanghalan Celebrity Champions.

In 2021, Rhap returned to ABS-CBN's It's Showtime as the hidden celebrity performer on “Hide and Sing!”.

In 2022, Rhap released his single, “Barely Breathing” (co-written with his partner), performing it on the Wish USA bus in Los Angeles, California (an extension of Wish 107.5 FM).

In April 2023, Rhap performed for Sam Smith’s album release party of Gloria on “ALL ACCESS: Sam Smith The Glor-Yacht Party” in Pasay, alongside drag queen Eva Le Queen. In June, Rhap sang a medley at LoveYourself’s Pride Night. In October, Rhap released his pop anthem, “Won’t Change” (produced by his partner). He was awarded "Outstanding TikTok LIVE Singer," at TikTok's Creators' Night in December. The event was hosted in Manila with a Black and White Avant-garde theme.

In 2024, he performed for Kapisanan Ng Pagkakaisa alongside Tuesday Vargas at the Tapusan Festival. He also reunited with his bandmate Rose Marielle Mamaclay and fellow singer Jex de Castro to perform a series of sold-out shows titled "Best of 3". Rhap ended the year with a performance at a night market in Al Rigga, Dubai.

In 2025, Rhap joined the ensemble of Side Show: The Musical, marking his first appearance in musical theater. Rhap performed at Mendez Day in Mendez-Nuñez, Cavite, sharing the stage with Michael Pangilinan, Khel and the Yudawans, Daryl Ong, and Rajih Mendoza before a packed audience.

In 2026, he started a Matcha business called Matcha Rhap.

== Filmography ==
=== TV shows ===
Year	Title	Role
2004	Little Big Star	Himself/Contestant/Winner
2006–present	ASAP	Himself
2007	Kokey	Jimboy Dalusong
2008	Boy & Kris	Himself
2009	Maalaala Mo Kaya	Coycoy
2009	ASAP	Himself
2009	Sharon	Himself
2009	The Ellen DeGeneres Show	Himself
2010	Habang May Buhay	Janus
2010–2011	Shout Out!	Himself/Performer
2012-2014	Luv U	Maximillio "Max" Mariano
2014	Ipaglaban mo	Boying
2019	It's Showtime: Tawag ng Tanghalan Celebrity Champions	Himself
2021	It's Showtime: Hide and Sing!	Himself

=== Movies ===
Year	Title	Role
2007	Paano Kita Iibigin	Lorenzo
2007	Pasukob	Melchor Jr.
2008	Ikaw Pa Rin (Bongga Ka Boy)	Jun Jun
2010	Father Jejemon	Excel

== Advertisements/Commercials ==
- Lucky Me Pancit Canton (2007)

== Discography ==
=== Albums ===
==== Compilation Albums ====
Artist	Album	Tracks	Year	Records
Little Big Star Artists	Little Big Star	Kaba by Makisig Morales; Kay Palad Mo by Rhap Salazar; Mr. Kupido by Micah Torre; Iingatan Ka by Kyle Balili; Sa Kandungan Mo by Jaya Sto. Domingo; Ako Ang Bukas by Shanne Velasco; Follow Your Dreams by Gian Barbarona; I'll Be There by Charice Pempengco; Pasulyap-sulyap by Rachel Pegason; Tara Tena by Sam Concepcion; Meron Ba? by Melvin Rimas; Till It's Time by Randy de Silva; Iisa Lang Tayo by Ronald Humarang; May Bukas Pa by Carl Camo	2006	Star Music
Little Big Star Artists	Little Big Superstar	Sisikat Din Ako by Sarah Geronimo & Makisig Morales; All You Need is Love by Makisig Morales; Reach for the Sky by Sarah Geronimo; Araw Natin 'to by Little Big Star Artists; Lucky Lucky Me by Rhap Salazar, Makisig Morales, Micah Torre & Charice Pempengco; Sisikat Din Ako (M1); All You Need is Love (M1); Reach for the Sky (M1); Araw Natin 'to (M1); Lucky Lucky Me (M1)	2007	Star Music

==== For Mak and the Dudes ====
Artist	Album	Tracks	Year	Records
Mak and the Dudes	Oldies But Kiddies	Breaking Up Is Hard To Do; Oh Carol; Stand By Me; Runaway; Diana; Ang Cute Ng Ina Mo; Araw Natin 'To; Breaking Up Is Hard To Do (M1); Oh! Carol (M1); Stand By Me (M1); Runaway (M1); Diana (M1); Ang Cute Ng Ina Mo (M1); Araw Natin 'To (M1)	2007	Star Music

==== 5thGen ====
Artist	Album	Tracks	Year	Records
5thGen	Contagious	Contagious	2015	Vega Entertainment Productions

==== Studio albums ====
Artist	Album	Tracks	Year	Records
Rhap Salazar	Rhap Salazar	Ben; Music And Me; Got To Be There; One Day In Your Life; Never Can Say Goodbye	2009	Star Music
Rhap Salazar	Now or Never	Now or Never	2014	Single
Quest feat. Rhap Salazar	Dream Awake	One Way Ticket	2019	Warner Music Philippines
Rhap Salazar	Barely Breathing	Barely Breathing	2022	Single
Rhap Salazar	Won't Change	Won't Change	2023	Single

== Personal life ==
Rhap grew up in Pinamalayan, Oriental Mindoro, Philippines, living with his mom, dad, older sister, two younger brothers, younger sister, and grandmother. He started singing at the age of 3 and professionally at the age of 7. Recognizing his interest in music, Rhap's parents, along with his grandmother, relocated to Metro Manila when he was 9 years old so he could pursue a career in music. His grandmother took him to his first professional vocal lessons.

In school, Rhap loved learning English and became bilingual.

As a teenager, Rhap started providing for his family, paying for his siblings’ schooling and moving his family from the province to Manila. Given the limited opportunities in the entertainment industry, he prioritized his career over education. He had to carefully manage his public image, forcing him to mature quickly.

Rhap started learning the ukulele before transitioning to the guitar at 16. However, he no longer actively plays either instrument.

When Rhap was 17, he got his first tattoo, a tribute to love, music, and faith, on his wrist. In total, he has 13 tattoos. One notable tattoo is from the legendary tattoo artist Whang-od. Another notable tattoo is his mother’s name in Baybayin on his back. On his arms he has three Bind Runes (Health, Vitality, Success), a giraffe, a cat, two androgynous figures kissing, the words “You are loved”, play/pause controls, a rainbow stripe, the Aquarius constellation, 3 stars, and a tribute to his character (the Half and Half Nightingale) from Side Show: The Musical.

In his 20’s, Rhap picked up boxing as a hobby.

He found fulfillment in the entertainment industry, although being homeschooled meant missing milestones like prom, college graduation, and traditional teenager experiences. While he doesn’t regret prioritizing his career, he acknowledged the personal sacrifices involved. He hopes to pursue higher education abroad when the time is right.

Rhap has a white female Pomeranian dog named Blu and a female Munchkin cat named Mini. He is left-handed.

He enjoys traveling all over the world, staying in Singapore, Dubai, Bali, Hong Kong, Redlands, Bangkok, Maldives, London, and Berlin.

When he settles down, he'll ensure his future children finish their education so that they can enjoy key milestones before they pursue their passions.

== Quotes ==
“Always choose to be kind.”

“Always remember that every second, you are loved.”

== Official Accounts ==
- Facebook
- TikTok
- YouTube
- Instagram
- Twitter
- Threads
- Apple Music
- SoundCloud
- Official Website
