= Janelle Quintana =

Filipino actress (born 1989)

Janelle Manahan
- Born: Janelle Ann Caren Quintana Manahan; 26 July 1989 (age 37); Legazpi City, Albay, Philippines
- Occupations: Actress
- Years active: 1995–2008; 2013

Janelle Ann Caren Quintana Manahan (born 26 July 1989) is a Filipino actress. She started show business when she joined ABS-CBN's reality talent search Star Circle National Teen Quest as Janelle Manahan and made it to the top 6.

After her supporting stint in SCQ Reload and other ABS-CBN shows. Star Magic, her former Talent Agency, decided to change her screen name to Janelle Quintana to avoid confusion about her non-relationship with Star Magic's head, Mr. Johnny Manahan. She was later reintroduced as Janelle Quintana as one of the main leads in ABS-CBN's teen sitcom Let's Go.

She is now a licensed financial adviser, certified investment solicitor, stock trader and a member of the Million Dollar Round Table (MDRT), the Premier Association of Financial Professionals around the world. She started her career in the financial services industry in October 2013 with Philam Life.

== Personal life ==
Janelle was born in Albay to parents Maria Rosario Elvira Quintano Manahan and Julius Alejo Manahan, who is a radio personality in their province. Ever since she was a child, her parents noticed her love for dancing, acting and singing. She was influenced by her father, who's in the media.

Her showbiz career started when she auditioned for Star Circle National Teen Quest, among the thousand to audition, she made it into the top 10; she was supposedly part of the FAB 5 (top 5) but due to the wild card, Paw Diaz grabbed the spot and she finished her league in the top 6.

After SCQ, she has been seen in some ABS-CBN shows like SCQ Reload: Kilig Ako!, ASAP Fanatic and Vietnam Rose. Then she changed her screen name to Janelle Quintana and has been seen in shows like Your Song, Maalaala Mo Kaya and Komiks, among others. She was best known for her role as the chubby chikadora named "Maffi" in ABS-CBN's sitcom Let's Go.

While busy taping for Let's Go, Janelle and Ram Revilla crossed paths, and their relationship as boyfriend-girlfriend started. There are rumours that due to Ram's request, Janelle quit showbiz and left Let's Go's 3rd season as well. She declined her supposed big break for Anne Curtis and Zanjoe Marudo's starrer The Wedding.

While away from showbiz, she was enrolled in De La Salle–College of Saint Benilde. Her unpublicized relationship with Ramgen lasted for five years, and they were supposed to get married by 2013. Ramgen died on 28 October 2011. She miraculously survived the incident and is now the star witness to her deceased former boyfriend's case.

In January 2012, an intimate video of Janelle and Ramgen was leaked on the internet. Ramgen's brother, Senator Ramon Revilla Jr. has condemned the release of this video, much to his embarrassment as he was an author of an anti-voyeurism bill.

== Career ==
Quintana came into showbiz when she joined Star Circle National Teen Quest (as Janelle Manahan). Representing Albay, she made it to SCQ's Magic Circle of 10 and made it to the Top 6.

Quintana is best known for her role as the chubby showbiz fanatic, Maffi in ABS-CBN's sitcom Let's Go. She was voted as one of the two most popular cast members of the sitcom alongside Mikel Campos.

Quintana was nominated as Best New Female Artist in the 19th Aliw Awards. She was included in the It Girls and Boys section of 2008 Star Magic Catalog.

She was set to be part of the upcoming ABS-CBN teleserye The Wedding top-billed by Zanjoe Marudo, Derek Ramsay & Anne Curtis, but she declined the offer due to her plan of finishing her studies. She was also rumoured to be living in with boyfriend Ram Revilla.

== Ram Revilla's murder ==
On the night of 28 October 2011, Janelle was at the Bautista Residence in BF Homes, Parañaque to accompany her former boyfriend Ram Revilla. According to her reply affidavit, it was around 11:00 p.m. PHT when the crime was executed. It happened inside Ram's room.

She was first shot in her right shoulder, followed by another gunshot on the left side of her face. When Ram and Ramona "Mara" Bautista, Ram's sister, whose on the room as well, saw she was shot, Ram immediately confronted the gun man whose wearing a Halloween mask. After the commotion with the killer, Ram was able to return inside the room and asked Ramona to lock the door. According to Janelle, Mara was panicking at that time and didn't know what to do. Mara left the room and promised her to look for help but she did not come back. By instinct, she used her mobile phone to send a message to her mom and some friends to seek help. It did not take a while before both Janelle and Ram were rescued and brought to the nearest hospital.

Janelle survived the incident but Ram was pronounced dead on arrival.

Janelle was then transferred to the Asian Hospital and Medical Center in Muntinlupa where she was cured and received several facial surgeries. She learned about Ram's death a week after the crime. She stayed in the Asian Hospital for more than a month, and following her discharge, she strongly prepared herself to fight for Ram's case. It was Ram's siblings, Ramon Joseph Bautista and Ramona Bautista, who were accused of the crime.

== Nomination ==
Best New Female Artist (19th Aliw Awards)

== Filmography ==
=== Film ===
Film
Year	Title	Role
2013	Bad Romance	Sarah Alonzo

=== Television ===
Television
Year	Title	Role	Notes
1995–2001	Barney & Friends	Christina	Main Role (1995-2001)
2004–2005	Star Circle National Teen Quest	Herself / Contestant	Made it to top 6. Credited as Janelle Manahan but 6th place.
2005	Vietnam Rose	Patricia	
2005	ASAP Fanatic		
2005	SCQ Reload: OK Ako!	Janelle, Manang Leona's niece	Additional Cast
2006	Star Magic Presents: The Game of Love		
2006	Mga Anghel na Walang Langit	Dorina's friend	
2006	Let's Go!	Maffi	Original cast member. Season 1-3
2006	Maalaala Mo Kaya: Tanan		
2006	Your Song: Everything You Do		
2006	Panday	Violeta	
2006	Komiks Presents: Starman	Pilar	
2006	Komiks: The Adventures of Pedro Penduko	Elizabeth	
2006	Maalaala Mo Kaya: Lito Atienza Story		
2008	My Girl		
