= Anja Aguilar =

Flipina singer

- Born: Angellie G. Urquico; Marikina, Philippines
- Occupations: Actress, singer
- Years active: 2006–present
- Agents: Star Magic (2006–2010); Viva Artists Agency (2010–present)
- Partner: Jomari Nicolas
- Children: 2

Angellie G. Urquico, better known by her stage name Anja Aguilar, is a Filipino actress and recording artist. She was the grand winner of the second season of Little Big Star in 2006. She is a former member of the group Pop Girls from VIVA Records.

== Life and career ==
Aguilar hails from Marikina, where she was born as Angellie G. Urquico, by which name she was known when she won the grand prize of ABS-CBN's singing competition Little Big Star, hosted by her idol Sarah Geronimo. As early as four years old, she already exemplified her singing talent at birthday parties and family gatherings. She has since joined over 50 contests which include Batang Vidaylin on ABC-5 (now The 5 Network) and Duet Bulilit on ABS-CBN's then noontime show MTB. After her breakthrough triumph in Little Big Star, acting opportunities also opened. She starred in an episode of Maalaala Mo Kaya, where she played a 12-year-old girl who fell in love with a 26-year-old guy, played by Piolo Pascual. She made a few drama series appearances on ABS-CBN, such as Maria La Del Barrio, May Minamahal, and Palos. In film, she was seen in a minor role in Praybeyt Benjamin. She appeared in an indie film, Astig, starring Dennis Trillo, and another called Ugat sa Lupa.

Aguilar signed up with Viva Artists Agency on May 15, 2010, and became a member of Pop Girls, along with Shy Carlos and Nadine Lustre. The screen name "Anja Aguilar" came to be as a suggestion by VAA President Veronique R. Corpus. In January 2012, she was launched as one of ASAP 2012's main talents. Her self-titled debut album was released in February.

The 10–track album Anja Aguilar has original compositions by Vehnee Saturno, including the hit carrier single "To Reach You". She also recorded a cover of Willie Revillame's song "I Love You", which was used by TV5's drama series P.S. I Love You as its theme song. Director Monti Parungao, behind the music videos of "Bakit Pa Ba" by Sarah Geronimo and "Masasabi Mo Ba" by Rachelle Ann Go and reality shows like Survivor, also directed the video of "To Reach You".

== Filmography ==
=== Television ===
Year	Show	Role
2006	Little Big Star	Herself/Contestant
2006–2011	ASAP	Herself/Performer
2007	Sineserye Presents: May Minamahal	Pinky Tagle
2007	Maalaala Mo Kaya: Dream House	Rian
2008	Palos	Young Sylvia
2009	Squalor	Mameng
2009	Maalaala Mo Kaya: Teacher	Tara's Sister
2010	Maalaala Mo Kaya: Bahay	Joy
2010	Maalaala Mo Kaya: Marriage Contract	Mark's Sister
2010	Maalaala Mo Kaya: Parol	Young Judy
2011	Maalaala Mo Kaya: Tulay	Young Eva
2012	Maalaala Mo Kaya: Kalendaryo	Pinky Chavez
2015	MTV Pinoy	Celebrity VJ
2016	Class 3C Has A Secret	Freya / Tania
2017	Someone to Watch Over Me	Queenie

=== Film ===
Year	Movie	Role
2009	Astig	Memeng
2009	Ugat Sa Lupa	N/A
2011	The Unkabogable Praybeyt Benjamin	Jesamine Santos
2014	The Amazing Praybeyt Benjamin	Jesamine Santos
2015	Your Place or Mine?	Micah Angeles
2015	Para sa Hopeless Romantic	Micah
2015	Felix Manalo	young Avelina
TBA	The Super Praybeyt Benjamin	Jesamine Santos

== Discography ==
- Anja Aguilar (2012)
