= Eda Nolan =

Filipino actress (born 1988)

- Born: December 14, 1988 (age 37); Cebu, Philippines
- Occupations: Actress, model
- Years active: 2006–2023
- Agent: Star Magic (2006–present)
- Height: 1.65 m (5 ft 5 in)
- Partner: Gian Carlos (2006−2012)
- Children: 1

Eda Kristy (born December 14, 1988), known professionally as Eda Nolan, is a Filipina actress, best known for her role as Junniper, the shy, 'promdi' girl, in ABS-CBN's sitcoms, Let's Go and Gokada Go. Nolan has been a member of Star Magic, ABS CBN's circle of homegrown talents, since 2006.

== Career ==
Eda first started as a contestant in ABS-CBN's reality-based talent search Star Circle Quest: Season 2 in 2004. She was part of the Top 25, but never made it to the finals. Eventually, Eda was asked to audition for Star Magic. When she was about to leave ABS-CBN she met Mr. M who talked to her and asked her to come back after graduation. Eda is personally hand picked by Mr. M. During the audition and she was the only one who was able to pass the audition.

After high school graduation, Eda went back to Manila to undergo training and workshop in acting, singing and dancing, which lasted for six months. After the training, Eda patiently waited for an offer. Getting bored and feeling it was not just her time yet, she decided to go back to Cebu. And just when she made up her mind to pursue her studies, she got a call asking her to audition for the sitcom Let's Go. This time, she got picked and she started having more offers and projects.

== Filmography ==
=== Television / Digital series ===
Year	Title	Role
2004	Star Circle National Teen Quest	Contestant
2006	Maalaala Mo Kaya: Kwintas	Special Guest
2006	Let's Go	Junniper
2007	That's My Doc	Eda
2007	Walang Kapalit	Vanessa Santillian
2007	Go Kada Go	Junniper
2007	Komiks Presents: Da Adventures of Pedro Penduko	Mayumi
2007	Komiks Presents: Si Pedro Penduko at ang mga Engkantao	Mayumi
2007	Love Spell: Click Na Click	Cali Eugenio
2007	Star Magic Presents: Love & The City	Rose
2007	Amor Chico	Amor
2008	My Girl	Sarah
2008	Your Song: Bakit Ba Ganyan?	Demi
2008	Maalaala Mo Kaya: Kanin	Young Aurora
2008	Carlo J. Caparas' Pieta	Young Ising
2008	Komiks Presents: Dragonna	Ella
2009	Jim Fernandez's Kambal Sa Uma	Young Lola Salve
2009	Dahil May Isang Ikaw	Mara Cortez
2009	Katorse	Nenita Reyes
2010	Elena M. Patron's Momay	Britney Corpuz
2010	Midnight DJ: Sikreto Ng Swing	
2010	Your Song Presents: Andi - Hawak Kamay	Sheila
2011	Maynila	Special Guest
2011	Pablo S. Gomez's Mutya	Brigit
2011	Minsan Lang Kita Iibigin	Young Mimi
2011	100 Days to Heaven	Young Carmen
2011	My Binondo Girl	Annie
2012	Maalaala Mo Kaya: Belo	Kathryn
2012	Wansapanataym: Hannah Panahon	Sheryl
2012	Walang Hanggan	Lorraine Delgado
2012	Maalaala Mo Kaya: Bangkang Papel	Special guest
2012	Angelito: Ang Bagong Yugto	Sheila Muñoz
2013	Maalaala Mo Kaya: Kamison	Eva
2013	May Isang Pangarap	Belen
2013	Maalaala Mo Kaya: Picture Frame	Rachel
2013	Wansapanataym: Fruitcake	Vivian
2013–2014	Luv U	Bettina "Betty" Ramos
2014	Home Sweetie Home	Candy
2014	Ipaglaban Mo: Kaya Ba Kitang Itakwil?	Sofia
2015	Maalaala Mo Kaya: Sapatos	Marissa
2015–2016	FPJ's Ang Probinsyano	Brenda F. Corpuz
2019	Maalaala Mo Kaya: Jersey	Ina
2019	Past, Present, Perfect?	Patring

=== Films ===
Year	Title	Role
2008	Kelly Kelly! Ang Hit na musical	Doray
2008	Shake, Rattle & Roll X	Blue
2009	Engkwentro	Jenny-Jane
2009	Villa Estrella	Giselle
2009	Mano Po 6: A Mother's Love	Young Tan Jin Feng
2010	Till My Heartaches End	Jane
2011	Bulong	Fatima
2012	Born To Love You	Jam
2013	Tuhog	Peachy
2014	Bride for Rent	Carding's wife
2014	Once A Princess	Kristine
2015	The Love Affair	Jane
2016	The Achy Breaky Hearts	Trisha Villanueva
2017	Love You to the Stars and Back	Jane
2019	Unbreakable	Concert Girl
2020	Us Again	Tina

== Controversy ==
=== Wowowee incident ===
On the May 12, 2007 episode of Wowowee, to promote ABS-CBN's new teen comedy "Gokada Go!", cast members from the show performed a dance number as part of the entertainment segment of the show. Nolan's tube top became loose, exposing one of her breasts. Although producers claimed that she had been wearing a skin-colored bra, Wowowee received a 3-day suspension from the Movie and Television Review and Classification Board.

=== Concealed pregnancy ===
In 2007, Eda disappeared from public view after she left the ABS-CBN sitcom, "That's my Doc!". She reappeared in February 2008 after revealing that she gave birth to a son, with her then-boyfriend, GMA-7 teen actor Gian Carlos.
