= Angeli Gonzales =

Filipino actress

- Born: Kaye Angeli Hirang Gonzales; March 9, 1994 (age 32); Biñan, Laguna, Philippines
- Education: De La Salle Medical and Health Sciences Institute (MD)
- Occupation: Doctor
- Years active: 2000–2016
- Agent: Star Magic (2000–2016)

Kaye Angeli Hirang Gonzales (born March 9, 1994) is a Filipino former teen actress. She is known for her role as April Muñoz in Luv U, where she co-starred Miles Ocampo and Marco Gumabao.

== Personal life ==
Gonzales is a Registered Medical Technologist. She finished her Doctor of Medicine degree at the De La Salle Medical and Health Sciences Institute with special awards such as Outstanding Clinical Clerk, Family and Community Medicine and Special Citation for Academic Excellence. On November 26, 2020, she passed the licensure examination for physician.

== Filmography ==
Year	Title	Role
2000–2003	Home Along Da Riles	ABK
2001–2003	Wansapanataym	Various Roles
2003-2005	Home Along Da Airport	ABK
2008	Palos	Young Anna
2008	Batang X: The Next Generation	Trinity
2009	Maalaala Mo Kaya: Relo	Cherry
2010	Maalaala Mo Kaya: Kalapati	Young Ballsy Aquino
2010	Maalaala Mo Kaya: Passbook	Krystal
2011	Maalaala Mo Kaya: Make-Up	Honey
2012–2013, 2014–2016	Luv U	April Muñoz
2013	Maalaala Mo Kaya: VHF Radio	Meda
2013	Got to Believe	Miley Rodriguez
2014	Maalaala Mo Kaya: Panyo	Episode Guest
2014	Maalaala Mo Kaya: Palayan	Marina
2015	Ipaglaban Mo	Various
