= Angel Locsin filmography =

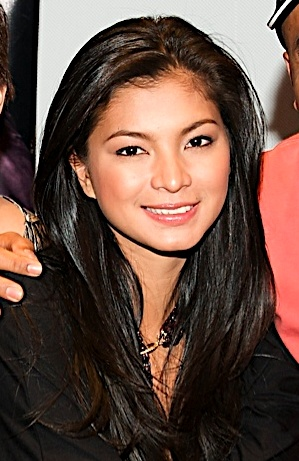
Locsin at the Los Angeles premiere of Love Me Again in 2008

Filipino actress Angel Locsin has appeared in motion pictures and television programs. She made her screen debut at age 15 as the young Robina Gokongwei in the biopic Ping Lacson: Super Cop (2000). Her first television appearance was in the teen drama series Click (2002), followed by a string of guest roles in the romance series Ang Iibigin ay Ikaw (2002), Twin Hearts (2003), and Love to Love (2003). Locsin had minor appearances in the second and third installments of the Mano Po film franchise, Mano Po 2: My Home (2002) and Mano Po 3: My Love (2003). In 2004, she had her breakthrough role as the avian-human hybrid heroine in the fantasy series Mulawin, a role she reprised in its 2005 film adaptation.

Locsin gained wider recognition and received praise for portraying the title character in the 2005 television series Darna, which is based on Mars Ravelo's comics superheroine of the same name. She starred opposite Richard Gutierrez in the romantic dramas Let the Love Begin (2005) and I Will Always Love You (2006). During this period, Locsin appeared alongside Dennis Trillo in the horror thriller Txt (2006) and the fantasy adventure series Majika (2006). She reunited with Richard Gutierrez in the coming-of-age drama The Promise (2007) and played a collector for a secret society in the action-adventure series Asian Treasures (2007) with Robin Padilla. For her role as a fledgling lycanthrope in the supernatural drama series Lobo (2008), she earned an International Emmy Award nomination for Best Actress. The same year, Locsin appeared in an episode of the anthology series Maalaala Mo Kaya, for which she won a Star Award for Best Actress. She then played an aspiring chef in the comedy series remake Only You (2009), and portrayed the offspring of her lycan character in Lobo's sequel, Imortal (2010).

Critical success followed with Locsin's performances in collaborations with high-profile directors. She played a ranch worker in Rory Quintos' drama Love Me Again (2009), a courtesan in Olivia Lamasan's star-crossed romance In the Name of Love (2011), and a sexually promiscuous journalist afraid of commitment in Cathy Garcia-Molina's comedy Unofficially Yours (2012). For playing a single mother forced to reconnect with her estranged husband to be their son's stem cell donor in the romantic drama One More Try (2012), she garnered Best Actress wins at the FAMAS and Star Awards. Locsin's portrayals of the grief-stricken title character in the drama series The Legal Wife (2014) and the indoctrinated military nurse in the spy-action thriller series The General's Daughter (2019) earned her nominations at the Star Awards. She won Best Actress in a Drama Series for the latter. In 2016, she appeared in the comedies Everything About Her and The Third Party.

Aside from acting, Locsin served as a judge during the fifth and sixth seasons of the reality talent competition show Pilipinas Got Talent. She also provided her voice to the animated series Initial D: Fourth Stage (2004).

== Film ==
Angel Locsin's film credits
Year	Title	Role	Notes	Ref(s)
2000	Ping Lacson: Supercop	Robina Gokongwei		
2003	Mano Po 2: My Home	Melissa Ching		
2004	Kuya	Barbs		
2004	Singles	Samantha		
2004	Sigaw	Pinky		
2004	Mano Po 3: My Love	Eliza		
2005	Let the Love Begin	Pia		
2005	Mulawin: The Movie	Alwina		
2006	I Will Always Love You	Cecille		
2006	TxT	Joyce		
2006	Mano Po 5: Gua Ai Di	Charity Kho		
2007	The Promise	Andrea		
2007	Angels	Angie		
2009	Love Me Again	Arah		
2010	My Amnesia Girl	MMA fighter	Cameo	
2011	In the Name of Love	Mercedes Fernandez		
2012	Unofficially Yours	Ces Bricenio		
2012	One More Try	Grace		
2013	Four Sisters and a Wedding	Alex Salazar		
2014	The Amazing Praybeyt Benjamin	Unnamed	Cameo	
2016	Everything About Her	Jaica Domingo		
2016	The Third Party	Andi Medina		
2020	Block Z	Unnamed raider	Cameo	
2020	Four Sisters Before the Wedding	Alex Salazar	Cameo	

== Television ==
Angel Locsin's television credits with year of release, title(s) and role
Year	Title	Role	Notes	Ref(s)
2002	Click	Charley Francisco		
2002	Ang Iibigin ay Ikaw	Mariella		
2003	Ang Iibigin ay Ikaw Pa Rin	Mariella		
2003	Twin Hearts	—		
2003	Love to Love	—	Episode: "Kissing Beauty"	
2004	All Together Now	—		
2004	Magpakailanman	Jonalyn dela Peña	Guest role	
2004	Mulawin	Alwina		
2004	Initial D: Fourth Stage	Kyoko Iwase (voice)	Animated series	
2005	Darna	Narda / Darna		
2006	Majika	Sabina		
2007	Asian Treasures	Gabriela Agoncillo		
2007	Maalaala Mo Kaya	Melody	Episode: "Pilat"	
2007	That's My Doc	Sylvia	Guest role Episode: 24	
2008	Lobo	Lyka Raymundo		
2009	Only You	Jillian Mendoza		
2009	Maalaala Mo Kaya	Nemie	Episode: "Blusa"	
2010	Imortal	Lia Ortega		
2010	Maalaala Mo Kaya	Jenna	Episode: "Litrato"	
2011	100 Days to Heaven	Tagabantay / Nurse	Guest role	
2011	Toda Max	Isabel Padausdos		
2012	Wansapanataym	Abby	Episode: "Ang Kulay ng Pasko"	
2013	Maalaala Mo Kaya	Mildred	Episode: "Mask"	
2014	The Legal Wife	Monica Santiago		
2015	Maalaala Mo Kaya	Suzette Tucay	Episode: "Plano"	
2016	Pilipinas Got Talent	Herself	Judge	
2017	Maalaala Mo Kaya	Samina / Roma Tarub	Episode: "Kotse-kotsehan"	
2017	La Luna Sangre	Lia Ortega / Jacintha Magsaysay	Guest role	
2018	Pilipinas Got Talent	Herself	Judge	
2019	Kadenang Ginto	Unnamed	Cameo	
2019	The General's Daughter	Rhian Bonifacio		
2020	Iba Yan	Herself	Host	

== See also ==
- List of awards and nominations received by Angel Locsin
