= List of awards and nominations received by Angel Locsin =

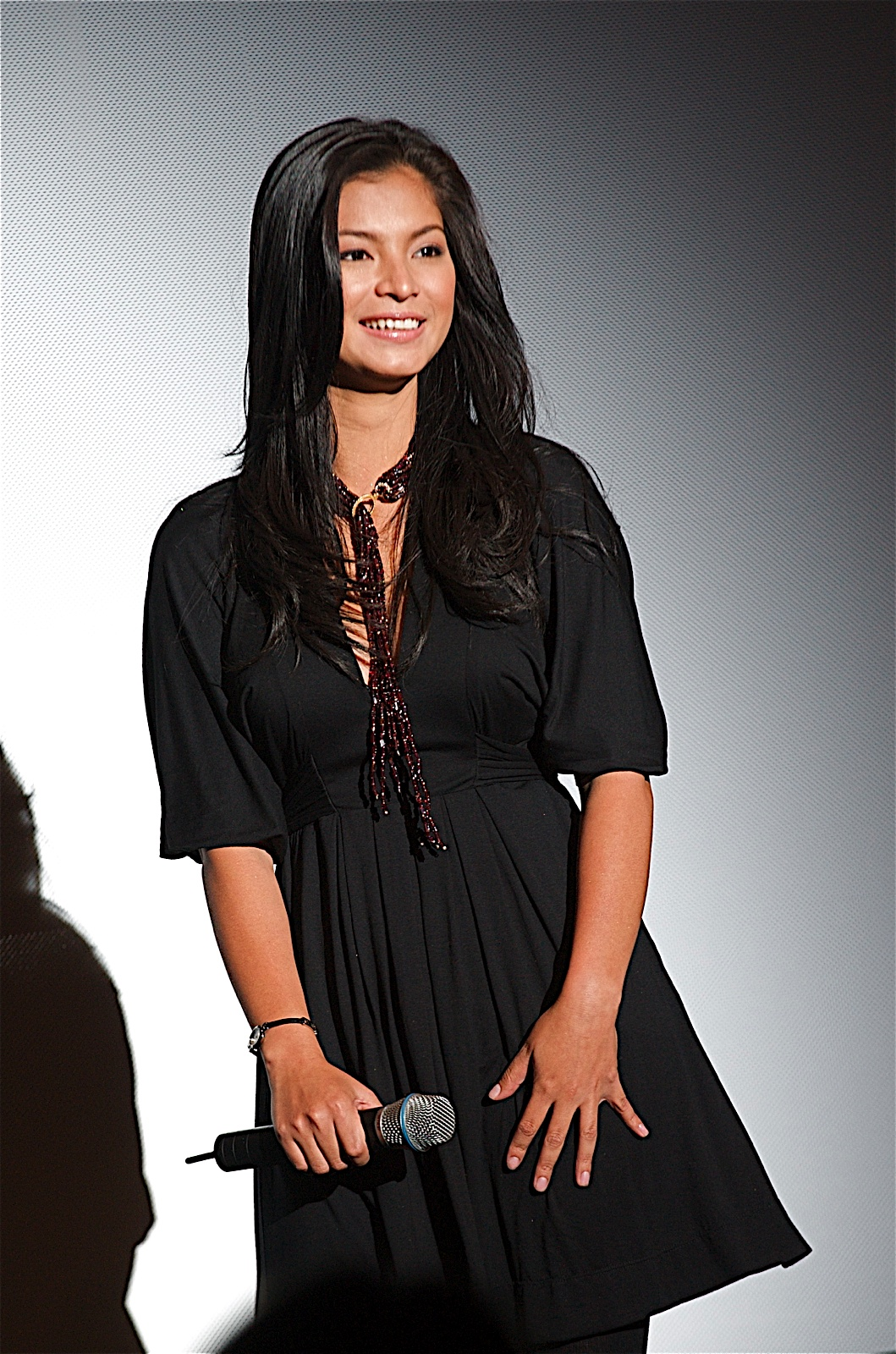
Locsin at the Los Angeles premiere of Love Me Again in 2008

Angel Locsin is a Filipino actress who has received various awards and nominations for her work in film and television. She began her acting career with a supporting role in the biographical drama Ping Lacson: Supercop (2000). Locsin had her breakthrough as the avian-human hybrid protagonist in the fantasy television show Mulawin (2004) and its 2005 film adaptation, for which she received a Box Office Entertainment Award for her roles. She followed this with starring roles in fantasy action shows, including Darna (2005), Majika (2006), and Asian Treasures (2007), for the latter of which she was nominated for a Star Award for Best Drama Actress. Locsin appeared in a 2007 episode of the anthology series Maalaala Mo Kaya playing a facially disfigured abuse victim, and earned a Star Award for Best Single Performance by an Actress for her role.

In 2008, Locsin played a fledgling werewolf in the supernatural drama series Lobo, for which she received an International Emmy Award nomination for Best Actress. Her leading roles in the television series Only You (2009) and Imortal (2010) each garnered her nominations for Best Actress in a Drama Series at the Star Awards. For playing a Japan-based courtesan in the star-crossed romantic drama In the Name of Love (2011), she won Movie Actress of the Year at the Box Office Entertainment and Star Awards. Critical success came with the drama One More Try (2012), in which she portrayed a single mother caring for her illness-stricken son. She won several awards, including a Box Office Entertainment, a FAMAS, a Luna, and a Star Award for Best Actress. The following year, she gained a Star Award nomination for Best Comedy Actress for the sitcom Toda Max.

For her portrayal of the title character in the drama series The Legal Wife (2014), Locsin was nominated for a Star Award for Best Drama Actress. She then starred in the comedy drama Everything About Her (2017) and earned a Best Supporting Actress win at the Asia-Pacific Film Festival. Her guest role in a 2017 episode of the anthology series Maalaala Mo Kaya won her a KBP Golden Dove Award for Best Actress. In 2019, Locsin played an indoctrinated military nurse in the spy-action thriller series The General's Daughter, for which she was awarded a Star Award for Best Drama Actress and a Box Office Entertainment Awards for TV Actress of the Year. In addition to her acting career, Locsin is known for her philanthropic efforts, for which she was named one of Asia's Heroes of Philanthropy by Forbes magazine.

== Awards and nominations ==
Awards and nominations received by Angel Locsin
Organizations (Note: Awards, festivals, honors and other miscellaneous organizations are listed in alphabetical order.)	Year (Note: Indicates the year of ceremony. Each year is linked to the article about the awards held that year, wherever possible.)	Recipient(s)	Category	Result	Ref(s).
Asia-Pacific Film Festival	2017	Everything About Her	Best Supporting Actress	Won	
Box Office Entertainment Awards	2006	Mulawin; Mulawin: The Movie	Princess of Philippine Movies & TV	Won	
Box Office Entertainment Awards	2008	The Promise	Princess of Philippine Movies	Won	
Box Office Entertainment Awards	2012	In the Name of Love	Film Actress of the Year	Won	
Box Office Entertainment Awards	2013	One More Try	Film Actress of the Year	Won	
Box Office Entertainment Awards	2020	The General's Daughter	TV Actress of the Year	Won	
Box Office Entertainment Awards	2020	The General's Daughter	Best Acting Ensemble in a Drama Series (Note: Shared with co-stars Tirso Cruz III, Albert Martinez, Janice de Belen, Eula Valdes, Paulo Avelino, Arjo Atayde, JC de Vera, Ryza Cenon, and Maricel Soriano.)	Won	
EdukCircle Awards	2014	The Legal Wife	Best Actress for Television	Won	
EdukCircle Awards	2015	Angel Locsin	Most Influential Celebrity Endorsers of the Year	Won (Note: Tied with Toni Gonzaga, Piolo Pascual, Vic Sotto, Carmina Villarroel and Family, Angel Locsin, Robin Padilla, Kris Aquino, Sarah Geronimo, and John Lloyd Cruz.)	
EdukCircle Awards	2016	Angel Locsin	Most Influential Celebrity Endorsers of the Year	Won (Note: Tied with Alden Richards, Maine Mendoza, Kathryn Bernardo, Angel Locsin, Nadine Lustre, Enrique Gil, Sarah Geronimo Liza Soberano, James Reid, and Daniel Padilla.)	
EdukCircle Awards	2017	Maalaala Mo Kaya (Episode: "Kotse-kotsehan")	Best Actress in a Single Drama Performance	Won	
EdukCircle Awards	2019	The General's Daughter	Best Actress in a Television Series	Won	
EdukCircle Awards	2020	Angel Locsin	Most Influential Celebrities of the Decade	Won (Note: Tied with Sarah Geronimo, Daniel Padilla, Kathryn Bernardo, Maine Mendoza, Bea Alonzo, Vice Ganda, Coco Martin, Angel Locsin, and Alden Richards.)	
The EDDY Awards	2017	Everything About Her	Best Supporting Actress	Won	
The EDDY Awards	2021	Angel Locsin	Isah V. Red Award	Won	
FAMAS Awards	2005	Angel Locsin	German Moreno Youth Achievement Award	Won	
FAMAS Awards	2005	Angel Locsin	Miss FAMAS Popularity	Won	
FAMAS Awards	2012	In the Name of Love	Best Actress	Nominated	
FAMAS Awards	2013	One More Try	Best Actress	Won	
FAMAS Awards	2014	Four Sisters and a Wedding	Best Actress	Nominated	
FAMAS Awards	2017	Everything About Her	Best Actress	Nominated	
FAMAS Awards	2020	Angel Locsin	Fernando Poe Jr. Memorial Award	Won	
Gawad Pasado	2012	In the Name of Love	Best Actress	Won	
Gawad Pasado	2014	Four Sisters and a Wedding	Best Supporting Actress (Note: Shared with co-stars Bea Alonzo, Toni Gonzaga, and Shaina Magdayao.)	Won	
Gawad Tanglaw	2015	The Legal Wife	Best Actress in a Drama Series	Won	
Gawad Tanglaw	2018	Maalaala Mo Kaya (Episode: "Kotse-kotsehan")	Best Actress in a Single Performance	Won	
Gawad Tanglaw	2018	Angel Locsin	Honorary Award for Women's Rights Advocacy (Note: Awarded as Gawad Parangal para sa Adbokasiya sa Kababaihan at Lipunan.)	Won	
Gawad Tanglaw	2020	The General's Daughter	Best Actress in a Drama Series	Won	
Gawad Tanglaw	2020	Angel Locsin	Honorary Award for the Arts and Humanitarian Work (Note: Awarded as Gawad Tanglaw para sa Sining ng Sangkatauhan.)	Won	
Golden Screen Awards	2012	In the Name of Love	Best Performance by an Actress in a Leading Role (Drama)	Nominated	
Golden Screen Awards	2014	Four Sisters and a Wedding	Best Performance by an Actress in a Leading Role (Musical or Comedy)	Nominated	
International Emmy Award	2009	Lobo	Best Actress	Nominated	
KBP Golden Dove Award	2018	Maalaala Mo Kaya (Episode: "Kotse-kotsehan")	Best Actress in a Drama Program	Won	
Luna Awards	2013	One More Try	Best Actress	Won	
Metro Manila Film Festival	2012	One More Try	Best Actress	Nominated	
Myx Music Awards	2011	"Magkaibang Mundo"	Favorite Guest Appearance in a Music Video	Won	
National Commission for Culture and the Arts Ani ng Dangal Awards	2010	Lobo	Multimedia Award for International Recognition	Won	
National Commission for Culture and the Arts Ani ng Dangal Awards	2018	Everything About Her	Cinema Award for International Recognition	Won	
Nickelodeon Philippines Kids' Choice Awards	2007	Angel Locsin	Pinoy Wannabe Award	Won	
Star Awards for Movies	2010	Angel Locsin	Darling of the Press	Nominated	
Star Awards for Movies	2012	In the Name of Love	Movie Actress of the Year	Won	
Star Awards for Movies	2012	Angel Locsin	Darling of the Press	Nominated	
Star Awards for Movies	2012	Angel Locsin	Miss Great Shape Personality	Won	
Star Awards for Movies	2013	One More Try	Movie Actress of the Year	Won	
Star Awards for Movies	2014	Four Sisters and a Wedding	Movie Actress of the Year	Nominated	
Star Awards for Movies	2017	Everything About Her	Movie Actress of the Year	Nominated	
Star Awards for Movies	2019	Angel Locsin	Darling of the Press	Nominated	
Star Awards for Television	2007	Asian Treasures	Best Drama Actress	Nominated	
Star Awards for Television	2008	Maalaala Mo Kaya (Episode: "Pilat")	Best Single Performance by an Actress	Won	
Star Awards for Television	2008	Lobo	Best Drama Actress	Nominated	
Star Awards for Television	2009	Only You	Best Drama Actress	Nominated	
Star Awards for Television	2010	Maalaala Mo Kaya (Episode: "Litrato")	Best Single Performance by an Actress	Nominated	
Star Awards for Television	2011	Imortal	Best Drama Actress	Nominated	
Star Awards for Television	2012	Toda Max	Best Comedy Actress	Nominated	
Star Awards for Television	2013	Toda Max	Best Comedy Actress	Nominated	
Star Awards for Television	2014	The Legal Wife	Best Drama Actress	Nominated	
Star Awards for Television	2015	Maalaala Mo Kaya (Episode: "Watawat")	Best Single Performance by an Actress	Nominated	
Star Awards for Television	2017	Maalaala Mo Kaya (Episode: "Kotse-kotsehan")	Best Single Performance by an Actress	Nominated	
Star Awards for Television	2019	The General's Daughter	Best Drama Actress	Won	
Star Awards for Television	2019	Angel Locsin	TV Queens at the Turn of the Millennium	Won	

== Other accolades ==
=== Listicles ===
Name of publisher, name of listicle, year(s) listed, and placement result
Publisher	Listicle	Year(s)	Ref(s).
Forbes	Asia's Heroes of Philanthropy	2019	
Tatler	Generation T List: Asia's Leaders of Tomorrow	2020	
Tatler	Asia's Most Influential	2020	

== See also ==
- Angel Locsin filmography
