= List of The General's Daughter episodes =

The General's Daughter is a 2019 Philippine drama television series starring Angel Locsin, Albert Martinez, Janice de Belen, Eula Valdes, Paulo Avelino, Arjo Atayde, JC de Vera, Ryza Cenon, Tirso Cruz III, and Maricel Soriano. The series premiered on ABS-CBN's Primetime Bida evening block and worldwide via The Filipino Channel on January 21, 2019, replacing Ngayon at Kailanman. The series concluded on October 4, 2019 with a total of 183 episodes.

== Series overview ==
Season	Episodes	Originally released	
Season	Episodes	First released	Last released
1	183	January 21, 2019	October 4, 2019

== Episodes ==
=== Season 1 (2019) ===
No. overall	No. in season	Title	Original release date	Kantar Media Ratings (nationwide)
2	2	"Reporting for Duty"	January 21, 2019	34.0%
2	2	"2nd. Lt. Rhian Bonifacio"	January 22, 2019	35.1%
3	3	"Tuloy ang Plano"	January 23, 2019	32.9%
4	4	"Paglalapit"	January 24, 2019	34.3%
5	5	"Engkwentro"	January 25, 2019	31.8%
6	6	"Apektado"	January 28, 2019	31.8%
7	7	"Naisahan"	January 29, 2019	31.1%
8	8	"Hanapin"	January 30, 2019	30.9%
9	9	"Magtago"	January 31, 2019	32.8%
10	10	"Duda"	February 1, 2019	31.8%
11	11	"Magkaila"	February 4, 2019	32.1%
12	12	"Talikuran"	February 5, 2019	31.3%
13	13	"Panindigan"	February 6, 2019	31.0%
14	14	"Pagpapanggap"	February 7, 2019	31.3%
15	15	"Konsensya"	February 8, 2019	29.2%
16	16	"Paikutin"	February 11, 2019	28.1%
17	17	"Aminado"	February 12, 2019	29.2%
18	18	"Mapalapit"	February 13, 2019	30.7%
19	19	"Simpatya"	February 14, 2019	29.7%
20	20	"Pagtatagpo"	February 15, 2019	28.5%
21	21	"Tensyon"	February 18, 2019	27.7%
22	22	"Pagamin"	February 19, 2019	30.0%
23	23	"Subukin"	February 20, 2019	30.2%
24	24	"Desidido"	February 21, 2019	31.4%
25	25	"Motibo"	February 22, 2019	30.4%
26	26	"Idamay"	February 25, 2019	32.8%
27	27	"Gulo"	February 26, 2019	33.0%
28	28	"Sisihan"	February 27, 2019	29.6%
29	29	"Magpatuloy"	February 28, 2019	31.7%
30	30	"Bantayan"	March 1, 2019	30.2%
31	31	"Bagong Simula"	March 4, 2019	31.2%
32	32	"Pagtulong"	March 5, 2019	31.2%
33	33	"Target"	March 6, 2019	31.1%
34	34	"Sugod"	March 7, 2019	32.9%
35	35	"Katotohanan"	March 8, 2019	30.3%
36	36	"Gulatan"	March 11, 2019	31.0%
37	37	"Magpakatotoo"	March 12, 2019	30.5%
38	38	"Pagsubok"	March 13, 2019	30.6%
39	39	"Imbestigahan"	March 14, 2019	32.3%
40	40	"Koneksyon"	March 15, 2019	28.9%
41	41	"Ebidensya"	March 18, 2019	34.0%
42	42	"Espiya"	March 19, 2019	33.4%
43	43	"Alamin"	March 20, 2019	32.7%
44	44	"Komprontasyon"	March 21, 2019	34.2%
45	45	"Pagbitiw"	March 22, 2019	32.3%
46	46	"Impormasyon"	March 25, 2019	35.2%
47	47	"Wanted"	March 26, 2019	35.2%
48	48	"Dakpin"	March 27, 2019	33.3%
49	49	"Konektado"	March 28, 2019	34.8%
50	50	"Pagkikita"	March 29, 2019	32.4%
51	51	"Paghaharap"	April 1, 2019	33.4%
52	52	"Atake"	April 2, 2019	33.9%
53	53	"Palaban"	April 3, 2019	31.8%
54	54	"Ipagtanggol"	April 4, 2019	33.8%
55	55	"Planta"	April 5, 2019	32.0%
56	56	"Pasabog"	April 8, 2019	31.3%
57	57	"Timbog"	April 9, 2019	33.7%
58	58	"Kasunduan"	April 10, 2019	30.8%
59	59	"Kakampi"	April 11, 2019	33.1%
60	60	"Iligtas"	April 12, 2019	32.1%
61	61	"Patibong"	April 15, 2019	30.4%
62	62	"Bagong Alyansa"	April 16, 2019	31.2%
63	63	"Magpakilala"	April 17, 2019	31.8%
64	64	"Set Up"	April 22, 2019	27.9%
65	65	"Plano"	April 23, 2019	28.7%
66	66	"Bisto"	April 24, 2019	29.0%
67	67	"Tiwala"	April 25, 2019	27.8%
68	68	"Pasabugin"	April 26, 2019	33.0%
69	69	"Kaguluhan"	April 29, 2019	32.1%
70	70	"Hinagpis"	April 30, 2019	28.2%
71	71	"Paglusob"	May 1, 2019	25.6%
72	72	"Pagtugis"	May 2, 2019	31.0%
73	73	"Magkasubukan"	May 3, 2019	29.3%
74	74	"Kidnap"	May 6, 2019	29.8%
75	75	"Bihag"	May 7, 2019	30.1%
76	76	"Natuklasan"	May 8, 2019	30.2%
77	77	"Subukan"	May 9, 2019	30.0%
78	78	"Kapalit"	May 10, 2019	27.0%
79	79	"Diskubre"	May 13, 2019	31.9%
80	80	"Rebelasyon"	May 14, 2019	34.9%
81	81	"Anak"	May 15, 2019	33.4%
82	82	"Pagtakas"	May 16, 2019	36.7%
83	83	"Tungkulin"	May 17, 2019	33.2%
84	84	"Pamilya"	May 20, 2019	34.1%
85	85	"Komplikado"	May 21, 2019	32.9%
86	86	"Protektahan"	May 22, 2019	33.0%
87	87	"Makilala"	May 23, 2019	31.5%
88	88	"Mapahamak"	May 24, 2019	28.5%
89	89	"Hulihan"	May 27, 2019	32.9%
90	90	"Sumuko"	May 28, 2019	33.0%
91	91	"Bantay Sarado"	May 29, 2019	31.5%
92	92	"Patago"	May 30, 2019	30.8%
93	93	"Natunton"	May 31, 2019	29.6%
94	94	"Nasundan"	June 3, 2019	30.4%
95	95	"Nakapuslit"	June 4, 2019	32.1%
96	96	"Babala"	June 5, 2019	29.9%
97	97	"Galit"	June 6, 2019	31.5%
98	98	"Away"	June 7, 2019	29.6%
99	99	"Paraan"	June 10, 2019	29.1%
100	100	"Kasado"	June 11, 2019	31.3%
101	101	"Operasyon"	June 12, 2019	29.2%
102	102	"Palabasin"	June 13, 2019	29.8%
103	103	"Hostage"	June 14, 2019	30.6%
104	104	"Laban"	June 17, 2019	32.2%
105	105	"Huli"	June 18, 2019	35.2%
106	106	"Peligro"	June 19, 2019	32.9%
107	107	"Pagkumbinsi"	June 20, 2019	29.5%
108	108	"Palabas"	June 21, 2019	30.2%
109	109	"Kulungan"	June 24, 2019	29.7%
110	110	"Umamin"	June 25, 2019	31.3%
111	111	"Ilaglag"	June 26, 2019	29.9%
112	112	"Traydor"	June 27, 2019	32.0%
113	113	"Pagbayarin"	June 28, 2019	28.9%
114	114	"Tulungan"	July 1, 2019	30.3%
115	115	"Tumiwalag"	July 2, 2019	32.7%
116	116	"Kasinungalingan"	July 3, 2019	30.9%
117	117	"Nalusutan"	July 4, 2019	29.7%
118	118	"Takas"	July 5, 2019	30.3%
119	119	"Nakalusot"	July 8, 2019	31.7%
120	120	"Sanib Pwersa"	July 9, 2019	33.5%
121	121	"Nawawala"	July 10, 2019	33.0%
122	122	"Kasangga"	July 11, 2019	33.7%
123	123	"Sikreto"	July 12, 2019	30.3%
124	124	"Tuloy Ang Laban"	July 15, 2019	31.5%
125	125	"Puntirya"	July 16, 2019	34.6%
126	126	"Pasakayin"	July 17, 2019	32.2%
127	127	"Hakbang"	July 18, 2019	32.2%
128	128	"Sundan"	July 19, 2019	31.9%
129	129	"Pigilan"	July 22, 2019	28.4%
130	130	"Isagawa"	July 23, 2019	29.8%
131	131	"Misyon"	July 24, 2019	32.0%
132	132	"Bistado"	July 25, 2019	30.6%
133	133	"Panganib"	July 26, 2019	28.9%
134	134	"Linlang"	July 29, 2019	30.1%
135	135	"Saklolo"	July 30, 2019	31.0%
136	136	"Magkasama"	July 31, 2019	29.6%
137	137	"Fake News"	August 1, 2019	29.2%
138	138	"Nagkita"	August 2, 2019	29.1%
139	139	"Ugnayan"	August 5, 2019	31.4%
140	140	"Balak"	August 6, 2019	31.9%
141	141	"Nalaman"	August 7, 2019	29.0%
142	142	"Aminin"	August 8, 2019	30.7%
143	143	"Dispatyahin"	August 9, 2019	28.9%
144	144	"Paaminin"	August 12, 2019	33.7%
145	145	"Iligpit"	August 13, 2019	32.0%
146	146	"Isalba"	August 14, 2019	29.6%
147	147	"Pangako"	August 15, 2019	32.3%
148	148	"Sagupa"	August 16, 2019	27.5%
149	149	"Kasabwat"	August 19, 2019	31.3%
150	150	"Nakamasid"	August 20, 2019	29.6%
151	151	"Tugisin"	August 21, 2019	31.8%
152	152	"Takot"	August 22, 2019	31.9%
153	153	"Hinala"	August 23, 2019	32.7%
154	154	"Kumpirmahin"	August 26, 2019	30.0%
155	155	"Harapan"	August 27, 2019	31.0%
156	156	"Natagpuan"	August 28, 2019	31.7%
157	157	"Patunayan"	August 29, 2019	31.5%
158	158	"Tensyon"	August 30, 2019	32.2%
159	159	"Gulat"	September 2, 2019	31.8%
160	160	"Cuatro"	September 3, 2019	32.6%
161	161	"Napahamak"	September 4, 2019	32.0%
162	162	"Madakip"	September 5, 2019	32.4%
163	163	"Tinangay"	September 6, 2019	32.8%
164	164	"Alas"	September 9, 2019	31.3%
165	165	"Uno vs. Cuatro"	September 10, 2019	31.1%
166	166	"Bagsik"	September 11, 2019	32.9%
167	167	"Sakripisyo"	September 12, 2019	32.8%
168	168	"Pamamaalam"	September 13, 2019	31.2%
169	169	"Bomba"	September 16, 2019	32.2%
170	170	"Sabog"	September 17, 2019	34.0%
171	171	"Damay"	September 18, 2019	33.0%
172	172	"Cinco"	September 19, 2019	N/A
173	173	"Tapatan"	September 20, 2019	31.3%
174	174	"Taktika"	September 23, 2019	31.5%
175	175	"Isasagad"	September 24, 2019	30.7%
176	176	"Bitaw"	September 25, 2019	33.2%
177	177	"Lusob"	September 26, 2019	31.5%
178	178	"Mahuli"	September 27, 2019	31.2%
179	179	"Asintado"	September 30, 2019	33.0%
180	180	"Planado"	October 1, 2019	32.7%
181	181	"Nabisto"	October 2, 2019	32.2%
182	182	"Final Mission"	October 3, 2019	35.2%
183	183	"Mission Accomplished"	October 4, 2019	35.9%
