= TxT (film) =

- DVD cover
- Directed by: Mike Tuviera
- Screenplay by: Penny Daza-Tuviera; Paul Daza
- Produced by: Lily Y. Monteverde; Malou Choa-Fagar; Antonio P. Tuviera
- Starring: Angel Locsin; Dennis Trillo; Oyo Sotto
- Cinematography: Marissa Floirendo
- Edited by: Manet Dayrit
- Music by: Jesse Lucas
- Production companies: Regal Entertainment; APT Entertainment
- Distributed by: Regal Entertainment
- Release date: October 18, 2006
- Running time: 114 minutes
- Country: Philippines
- Language: Filipino
- Budget: ₱25 million
- Box office: ₱44 million

TxT is a 2006 Filipino supernatural horror film directed by Michael Tuviera and starring Angel Locsin, Dennis Trillo, Oyo Sotto, Julia Clarete, Dante Rivero and Eugene Domingo. It was Tuviera's debut film as a director. It tells the story of a caregiver (Locsin) breaking up with her ex-boyfriend (Sotto) only to find herself being haunted by his spirits through text messages.

== Plot ==
Joyce, a caregiver in an elderly home, breaks up with her obsessive boyfriend, Roman. As a final request, Roman asks Joyce to drive him home with his car. The two meet an accident killing Roman and injuring Joyce.

Alex, a call center agent with feelings for Joyce, comforts Joyce after the accident. Days later, Joyce receives messages in her cellphone from Roman's number but dismisses it as a cruel prank. Roman's haunting continues by sending Joyce images of her current activities. Roman's haunting becomes more disturbing when Joyce starts receiving messages containing images of her acquaintances dead at exactly 3:29 am.

Aling Kuring, a restaurant owner and one of the people in the images, receives a call from Roman. Thinking it as a prank, Kuring answers the phone causing her head to shake violently to death. Lilia, Joyce's patient, is under the latter's constant watch after Joyce receives a text from Roman showing Lilia's death. Before 3:29 am, Joyce falls asleep and her phone begins to ring, waking up Lilia. Unable to wake Joyce, Lilia answers the call, killing her the same way Kuring died.

Joyce realizes that Roman is killing the people who did not support their relationship. She seeks the help of Dante, an anting-anting vendor and witch doctor. Dante asks Joyce if Roman did occult activities and asked for some of his possessions. Joyce breaks into Roman's room but is caught by Roman's mother Edith, who blames her for her son's death. Joyce receives another message from Roman showing an image of her best friend and next target, Ida. Joyce asks Ida to apologize to Roman for not supporting their relationship in an attempt to persuade Roman not to kill her. Instead, Ida berates Roman in his grave. Later, Joyce is arrested for trespassing and is detained for the night upon Edith's request. Joyce bribes a policeman with a cellphone to escape and asks for help to protect Ida. Joyce reaches Ida in the latter's home and waits for the police to arrive. However, their chief orders them to respond to a nearby accident. Joyce, in a panic as the police are diverted, leaves Ida alone in her room, where she is killed by Roman.

Joyce obtains some of Roman's possessions, his bloodied phone and a piece of paper containing a picture of him with Joyce together surrounded by incantations and symbols through Edith. Joyce gives these objects to Dante. It is revealed that while driving before the accident Roman forced Joyce to perform a pact by spilling drops of their blood over Roman's phone. The ensuing struggle caused the accident. While Dante further analyzes the other object, Joyce receives another message from Roman showing Joyce and Alex in a car accident causing Joyce to flee. Alex follows Joyce and the two argue. Joyce, wanting Alex not to be involved, tries to dissuade him but Alex insists to be with her eventually confessing his feelings for her.

Dante realizes that the incantation written on the paper means "shadow" and warns Joyce through a text that Roman's spirit follows her through her shadow. Roman takes over Joyce's body and forces her to ride the car with Alex. Roman knocks both of them unconscious and takes control of the car. Dante, driving a car, tries to warn Joyce through the phone causing him to collide with the car containing Joyce and Alex. Dante's car falls off the cliff and Joyce's car crashes in a nearby post. Joyce tries to save Dante but it is too late. Dante however manages to write the warning by typing a text message warning Joyce that Roman will take over Alex's body. Alex emerges from the top of the cliff and as Joyce cries for mercy while lightning strikes, he appears closer revealing Roman has successfully possessed him.

== Cast ==
- Angel Locsin as Joyce
- Dennis Trillo as Alex
  - Richard Gutierrez as Alex possessed by Roman
- Oyo Sotto as Roman
- Julia Clarete as Ida
- Dante Rivero as Dante
- Eugene Domingo as Aling Kuring
- Bing Loyzaga as Edith
- Lorenzo Mara as Allan
- Perla Bautista as Lola Lilia
- Allan K. as Quiapo Seller 1
- Roselle Gabriel as Quiapo Seller 2
- Bubbles Cristobal as Quiapo Buyer
- Mitoy Sta. Ana as SP01 Moya
- Malou Crisologo as Hospice Administrator
- Bong Dela Torre as Father Javier
- Karla Pambid as Ida's mother
- Jim Pebangco as Ida's father
- Luz Imperial as Beth
- Emelyn Santos as Maid 2
- Rene Mendoza as Mortician
- Eddie Boy Tuviera as Joey
- Paul Daza as Mourner 1
- Edgar Allan Guzman as Kanto Boy
- Ryan Julio as Kanto Boy
- Macky Aquino as Texting Carinderia Patron
- John Medina as Carinderia Patron 1
- Ryan Forbes as Carinderia Patron 2
- Jojo Oconer as Carinderia Patron 3
- Bo Vicencio as Carinderia Patron 4
- Cora Galdo as Jeep Passenger
- Mohammad Dana as Flirting Waiter
- Jeff Geraldine Vedeja as Coffee Shop Waitress
- Charles Edward Martinez as Call Center Employee

== Reception ==
Txt was rated "A" by the Cinema Evaluation Board for its 'excellent' and 'brilliant' cinematography. However it bombed at the Philippine box office. A review of the DVD called it a "provocative thriller".

== See also ==
- List of ghost films
