= List of Initial D episodes =

This is a list of episodes for the anime series Initial D.

== Initial D: First Stage (1998) ==
Episodes in First Stage are numbered as Acts.

No. overall	No. in season	English Dub title Japanese titles (translated)	Original release date
1	1	"The Ultimate Tofu Store Drift" "The Ultimate Tofu Store Drift!"; Transliteration: "Kyūkyoku no Tōfuya Dorifuto" (Japanese: 究極のとうふ屋ドリフト)	April 18, 1998
Takumi Fujiwara is an eighteen-year-old high school student who usually appears aloof and uninterested in most things. Along with his best friend Itsuki, they both work at a gas station. They are friends with a young man named Iketani, leader of the Akina Speedstars, a local racing team, and their manager Yuichi. One night, Iketani brings the two up Mount Akina to experience the life of a street racer. But just in time, the RedSuns from Mount Akagi led by the Takahashi brothers have come to challenge the Speedstars to a race. What they don't know is the fastest car on the downhill is an Eight-Six and that is what Takumi uses to deliver tofu every morning.
2	2	"Revenge! The Rumbling Turbo" "Revenge Declaration! The Howling Turbo"; Transliteration: "Ribenji Sengen! Hoeru Tābo" (Japanese: リベンジ宣言!ほえるターボ)	April 25, 1998
Keisuke Takahashi of the RedSuns is on the hunt for the mysterious ghost driver of Akina that defeated him with a shocking drift technique. Upon hearing this rumour, Iketani goes out to locate this monstrous Eight-Six only to learn that it belongs to Takumi's own dad.
3	3	"The Downhill Specialist Appears" "The Downhill Specialist Appears"; Transliteration: "Daunhiru Supeshiarisuto Tōjō" (Japanese: ダウンヒルスペシャリスト登場)	May 2, 1998
The Akina Speedstars has taken the challenge of the RedSuns, but Iketani won't be able to compete in the upcoming battle. By chance, he hopes he can get Bunta Fujiwara to race in his place.
4	4	"Into the Battle!" "Crashing the Race Meet!"; Transliteration: "Kōryū-sen Totsunyū!" (Japanese: 交流戦突入!)	May 9, 1998
Iketani patiently waits for Bunta to appear to drive for his team against Keisuke Takahashi, but to his surprise, Takumi shows up in his place, reluctantly. This puts everybody in a state of shock, as the unexpected is about to happen.
5	5	"Dogfight!" "End of the Dogfight!"; Transliteration: "Ketchaku! Doggufaito!" (Japanese: 決着!ドッグファイト!)	May 16, 1998
Everyone in the crowd are speechless, as they have just witnessed the impossible, an Eight-Six overtaking Keisuke's FD. Ryosuke goes up to solve what's the success behind this somewhat simple car to discover its unexpected secret. The next day Takumi goes out on a date with Natsuki to the beach, and the thrilling thoughts of racing have started to interest him.
6	6	"A New Challenger" "A New Challenger"; Transliteration: "Aratanaru Chōsen-sha" (Japanese: 新たなる挑戦者)	May 23, 1998
While Ryosuke is practicing with his FC on Akina's course, a more menacing vehicle appears from behind. Meanwhile Takumi is asked how he earned his godly drifting skills as Iketani wishes to see a demonstration first hand.
7	7	"A Racer's Pride" "A Racer's Pride"; Transliteration: "Hashiri-ya no Puraido" (Japanese: 走り屋のプライド)	June 13, 1998
Nakazato of the Nightkids wants to challenge this mysterious Eight-Six, but he assumes that its driver has agreed to do so. As Takumi ponders why he should take up the challenge, various people plan on making him change his mind.
8	8	"Time's Almost Up!" "Time's Almost Up!"; Transliteration: "Taimu Appu Sunzen!" (Japanese: タイムアップ寸前!)	June 20, 1998
The countdown to the night's battle is closing in as everyone has gathered, but where is the Eight-Six? Itsuki will have to make an embarrassing apology to everyone if his best friend decides not to show.
9	9	"Battle to the Limit!" "Battle to the Limit!"; Transliteration: "Genkai Battoru!" (Japanese: 限界バトル!)	June 27, 1998
In the world of street racing, the most essential way to win is through grip racing, which is what Nakazato believes in. He wants to crush the reputation of the Eight-Six's flashy drifting techniques with his R32.
10	10	"The 5 Consecutive Hairpins" "The Explosive 5-Point Hairpins!"; Transliteration: "Bakuretsu! 5-Ren Heapin" (Japanese: 爆裂!5連ヘアピン)	July 4, 1998
Nakazato has underestimated Akina's Eight-Six, and he might just be in trouble as the five consecutive hairpins are upon him. Also to everyone's surprise, Itsuki buys a new car.
11	11	"Shingo Arrives!" "The Dangerous Shingo Appears!"; Transliteration: "Denjarasu Shingo Tōjō" (Japanese: デンジャラス慎吾登場!)	July 11, 1998
To prove the potential of Itsuki's new car, Takumi drives it against a minor racing team from Gunma. Members of the NightKids has been appearing more often, so on the night that Iketani drives out his S13, Shingo appears from behind with deadly intents.
12	12	"The FR Killer" "The FR-Killing Deathmatch!"; Transliteration: "FR-Goroshi no Desumacchi" (Japanese: FR殺しのデスマッチ!)	August 1, 1998
A comparison between the Civic EG6 driving style and the type the Eight-Six is explained concerning the mystery of this new downhill devil from Myogi. Iketani requests that Takumi demonstrates the hidden potential the S13 carries.
13	13	"First Date" "Itsuki's First Date"; Transliteration: "Itsuki no Hatsu Dēto" (Japanese: イツキの初デート)	August 8, 1998
Itsuki is in love with Natsuki's friend, and tries to set up another date with her. Word is spreading fast of the upcoming gum-tape match, yet Takumi hasn't agreed to competing in one. Much to his disappointment, Shingo intends to make the Eight-Six come out by force.
14	14	"Evolving Drift" "The Drift Master Evolves!"; Transliteration: "Shinka suru Dorifuto no Tensai!" (Japanese: 進化するドリフト天才!)	August 15, 1998
Takumi has no plans in running away from Shingo's provoked challenge. When he discovers the suicidal consequences of having a duct tape death match with the addition of Shingo's dangerous driving, Takumi might just have added too much pressure on himself.
15	15	"Takumi's Fury" "Takumi: Flat-Out and Fuming!"; Transliteration: "Takumi·Dotō no Gekisō!" (Japanese: 拓海·怒涛の激走!)	August 22, 1998
Triggered by Shingo's reckless attacks, Takumi floors the gas on his Eight-Six harder than he's ever before performing an insanely different style of driving. On another story, Iketani will meet his angel.
16	16	"The Angel of Usui" "The Angel of Usui Pass"; Transliteration: "Usuitōge no Enjeru" (Japanese: 碓氷峠のエンジェル)	August 29, 1998
Rumors of the fastest on Usui Pass are a pair of females called Impact Blue. While Iketani is out on a date with his dream girl, his friends decide to watch this mountain pass in hoping to see the rare Sileighty in action.
17	17	"Sudden-Death Death Match" "Sudden-Death Death Match"; Transliteration: "Sadon Desu·Desu Macchi" (Japanese: サドンデス·デスマッチ)	September 12, 1998
Mako gives Iketani a tempting offer to lure the Eight-Six in challenging the Sil-Eighty. At first Iketani wasn't willing to agree to her terms, until Takumi considers it having his own agenda.
18	18	"Hot Winds and Furious Driving" "Hot Winds! Furious Driving! Usui Pass"; Transliteration: "Neppū! Gekisō! Usuitōge!" (Japanese: 熱風!激走!碓氷峠)	September 19, 1998
Takumi is about to realize the importance of knowing your mountain roads, as he struggles to keep up with the Sil-Eighty. The teamwork of Mako and Sayuki prove to be a perfect match, making Impact Blue's strategy is in their advantage.
19	19	"Super Drift!" "The Conclusive Super Drift!"; Transliteration: "Ketchaku! Sūpā Dorifuto" (Japanese: 決着!スーパードリフト)	September 26, 1998
Mako discovers a new rhythm in her driving, as the final stretches of Usui is in her grasp. Trailing from behind, Takumi continues to struggle keeping up in Mako's scary corner attacks and Sayuki's navigation.
20	20	"The End of Summer" "The End of Summer"; Transliteration: "Ji·Endo·Obu·Samā" (Japanese: ジ·エンド·オブ·サマー)	October 1, 1998
Iketani learns more about Mako's past and gets really depressed feeling that he isn't worthy enough for her. When Mako asks to meet with him where they first met, Iketani decides not to show up. He realizes his mistake and rushes to his angel but arrives much too late.
21	21	"Challenge From a Superstar" "Challenge From a Superstar"; Transliteration: "Supāsutā kara no Chōsen-jō" (Japanese: スパースターからの挑戦状)	October 17, 1998
Ryosuke has now issued a challenge to the Eight-Six's driver, but for some reason Takumi has been acting more spaced out than usual. Itsuki and Iketani are worried, believing that their friend maybe suffering from lovesickness.
22	22	"Fierce Uphill Battle!" "Fierce Uphill Battle!"; Transliteration: "Gekitō! Hiru Kuraimu" (Japanese: 激闘!ヒルクライム)	October 24, 1998
Takumi isn't the only one being challenged into a battle. After both losing to the newly famed Eight-Six, Keisuke Takahashi of the RedSuns and Takeshi Nakazato of the NightKids are competing against each other for position of which is the most skilled team in Gunma.
23	23	"The Rainy Downhill" "The Rainy Downhill Battle!"; Transliteration: "Ame no Daunhiru Batoru!" (Japanese: 雨のダウンヒルバトル!)	November 7, 1998
Another member of the RedSuns has issued a challenge against the Eight-Six, but this time it will be a rain battle down Mount Myogi.
24	24	"Akagi's White Comet!" "Akagi's White Comet!"; Transliteration: "Akagi no Shiroi Suisei!" (Japanese: 赤城の白い彗星!)	November 14, 1998
Everyone across Gunma has been waiting for this moment, when Akagi's White Comet comes face to face with Akina's Eight-Six. In preparation for this upcoming battle, Bunta tests out the stability of the Eight-Six.
25	25	"The Last Battle" "The Last Decisive Battle!"; Transliteration: "Kessen! Rasuto Batoru" (Japanese: 決戦!ラストバトル)	November 28, 1998
Nobody among the galleries has ever seen Ryosuke Takahashi drive his full potential, that is until the Eight-Six appeared. Instead of driving as the founder of the RedSuns, Ryosuke retains his title that made him famous. The White Comet has come at full force, as a new legend among the streets is about to be born between these two rivaling drivers.
26	26	"The New Downhill Legend!" "The New Downhill Legend!"; Transliteration: "Shin Daunhiru Densetsu!" (Japanese: 新ダウンヒル伝説!)	December 5, 1998
The thrill of street racing has finally caught up to Takumi. He still has a couple of tricks available to him, as the thrilling conclusion of Akina's Eight-Six and White Comet of Akagi's undefeated record is settled in one dynamic finish to remember.

== Initial D: Second Stage (1999–2000) ==
Second Stage episodes are numbered by Acts, but go from ACT.27 to ACT.39, as if the series is treated as a continuation of First Stage.

No. overall	No. in season	English Dub title Japanese titles (translated)	Original release date
27	1	"A New Threat" "Unfair Super Weapon!"; Transliteration: "Okite Yaburi no Sūpā Uepon!" (Japanese: 掟やぶりのスーパーウエポン!)	October 14, 1999
Emperor, a team of Lan-Evos from the Tochigi prefecture has arrived with the goal to crush every team in Gunma. Soon they realize the fastest car in Gunma isn't just Akagi's White Comet, but also a new downhill legend known as Akina's Eight-Six.
28	2	"Team Emperor on Akina" "Lan Evo Squad: Assault on Akina!"; Transliteration: "Ran'ebo Gundan, Akina Shutsugeki!" (Japanese: ランエボ軍団、秋名出撃!)	October 21, 1999
Iketani and Itsuki both wonder if the Eight-Six would get a new upgrade, in order to increase the performance of Takumi's vehicle. However, it is up to Bunta to decide upon the matter. Elsewhere, Emperor's winning streak isn't slowing down as they continue to sweep across Gunma, defeating every race team with ease. Their next target, Akina's Eight-Six.
29	3	"Premonition of Defeat" "Premonition of Defeat"; Transliteration: "Haiboku no Yokan" (Japanese: 敗北の予感)	October 28, 1999
Kyoichi senses an uncanny fighting spirit within the Eight-Six's driver, as he gives Seiji strict rules against the race. Seiji however decides to ignore these rules and launches his Evo IV into full power. Takumi is outclassed in almost every category as the Evo IV's power is truly amazing. The battle risk escalates when the race reaches the second half of the course.
30	4	"Hollow Victory" "Unfulfilling Victory"; Transliteration: "Moenai Shōri" (Japanese: 燃えない勝利)	November 4, 1999
In his heart, Takumi cannot accept his victory over the Evo IV and decides to make a vow. To add to his already uneasy thoughts, anonymous messages are being sent to Takumi concerning his relationship with Natsuki.
31	5	"Countdown to Destruction" "Countdown to Destruction"; Transliteration: "Hametsu e no Kauntodaun" (Japanese: 破滅へのカウントダウン)	November 11, 1999
Takumi soon discovers Natsuki's secret that leads him to vent his anger in an egotistic battle against Kyoichi at Akagi, thinking little of the huge disadvantage he has. Which became obvious when the Evo III starts to unleash its monster abilities.
32	6	"Goodbye Eight-Six" "Goodbye Eight-Six"; Transliteration: "Sayōnara Hachi-Roku" (Japanese: さようならハチロク)	November 18, 1999
Kyoichi is realizing just how incredible Akina's downhill specialist is, yet he has full confidence in his rally tuned Evo III. Takumi soon realizes the difference between the Eight-Six and the loud banging horsepower of the Evo III, and ultimately blows out the Eight-Six's engine. But, it seems that Bunta instinctively knows of the race taking place as a major turning point is about to happen in the series.
33	7	"Battle at Akagi!" "Battle at Akagi! The Black and White Flash!"; Transliteration: "Akagi Batoru! Shiro to Kuto no Senkō!" (Japanese: 赤城バトル! 白と黒の閃光!)	November 25, 1999
With the Eight-Six out of the picture, the RedSuns has become the main representatives of Gunma, as every local racer within the prefecture are in favor of Emperor's defeat. Ryosuke has returned on the street to defeat the revenge-seeking Kyoichi, who plans to use his theories of Motorsports against the White Comet. Also, Iketani and Kenji spot another racer from a neighboring prefecture.
34	8	"Dangerous Car" "Warning: This Car is Wild"; Transliteration: "Sono Kuruma Kyōbō ni Tsuki" (Japanese: そのクルマ 凶暴につき)	December 2, 1999
Mount Akagi's battle continues, as Ryosuke has his own theories about streetracing...and he plans to demonstrate its difference on Kyoichi's Evo III. Back in Akina, Takumi's routine way of life is gone with the absence of the Eight-Six and the discovery of Natsuki's secret. Takumi then disowns Natsuki at the end of the episode.: This episode's Japanese title is a reference to the 1989 neo-noir action thriller film Violent Cop.
35	9	"The New Eight-Six" "The New Eight-Six is Born"; Transliteration: "Nyū Hachi-Roku Tanjō" (Japanese: ニューハチロク誕生)	December 9, 1999
The Eight-Six has returned undergoing a major change. Takumi soon test-drives the new performance much to his mixed satisfactions and disappointments, but what he doesn't understand is what Bunta knows what's within that car. Also, the relationship between Takumi and Natsuki is falling apart, but Itsuki's heart is shaken with the appearance of Kazumi.
36	10	"The Eight-Six Turbo!" "The Eight-Six Turbo Issues a Challenge"; Transliteration: "Sensen Fukoku Hachi-Roku Tābo" (Japanese: 宣戦布告ハチロクターボ)	December 16, 1999
After Wataru issues a short-lived battle against Keisuke, his sister Kazumi introduces him to Itsuki leading to a chance meeting with another Eight-Six driver. At first everything seems right with the meeting, but because of Takumi's naïve reaction to his car's new downhill weapon, Wataru rubs it the wrong way as his bad side emerges.
37	11	"The Seal Is Broken" "The Seal is Unlocked..."; Transliteration: "Fūin wa Tokihanata reta..." (Japanese: 封印は解き放たれた...)	January 6, 2000
Takumi takes up the challenge and decides where the battle would take place. But before he can accept Wataru's challenge, he'll have to learn the most basic essentials of what it means to be a street racer. Also, Itsuki's relationship with Kazumi is teaching him the value of having a girlfriend.
38	12	"Eight-Six vs. Eight-Six" "Eight-Six vs. Eight-Six: The Battle of Souls"; Transliteration: "Hachi-Roku VS Hachi-Roku Tamashī no Batoru" (Japanese: ハチロクVSハチロク 魂のバトル)	January 13, 2000
Takumi is about to experience a completely different type of racer within Wataru's own Eight-Six, in a treacherous mountain pass consisting of mixed elevations, rusting guardrails, unexpected traps and aging rough pavements. As Takumi presses down the accelerator, the true nature of the Eight-Six's new hidden weapon emerges in its monstrous raw performance.
39	13	"Changing Seasons" "In the Changing Seasons"; Transliteration: "Utsuri Yuku Kisetsu no Naka de" (Japanese: 移りゆく季節のなかで)	January 20, 2000
The battle between the two Eight-Sixes have met Wataru's satisfaction much higher than he expected, but he plans to decide the outcome of this battle with the judgement of the human body's limitations. Takumi soon realizes he is losing grip of his pace. After the battle, a series of revelations take place among all the characters in preparation to what's coming next.

== Initial D: Extra Stage (2000) ==
No. overall	No. in season	Title	Original release date
40	1	"Beyond The Impact Blue" "Beyond the Impact Blue..."; Transliteration: "Inpakuto Burū no Kanata ni" (Japanese: インパクトブルーの彼方に...)	November 10, 2000
Lately Mako's driving concentration hasn't been in rhythm as Sayuki draws out her problem. As a phonecall from Shingo of the Nightkids reaches Sayuki, members of team Emperors are on the lookout for other race teams to conquer. To prevent the conquest, Impact Blue's Sil-Eighty will defend their home course tite against these outsiders.
41	2	"Sentimental White" "Sentimental White"; Transliteration: "Senchimentaru Howaito" (Japanese: センチメンタルホワイト)	November 11, 2000
To make Mako's world better, Sayuki sets up a perfect match for her best friend. At first this seems alright, but is it worth it if it means giving up her dreams in street racing for a relationship?

== Initial D: Third Stage – The Movie (2001) ==
- With his reputation growing, Takumi gets an offer of a lifetime from Ryosuke. Unsure of what decision to make, Takumi tries to find his answers by requesting a rematch with Kyoichi Sudō, leader of team Emperor, at his own homecourse.
- Takumi faces the son of an old rival of Bunta.
- As the season of Fall turns into Winter, Natsuki is determined to make her relationship with Takumi work. The unexpected arrival of an old flame of hers happens to be visiting from out of town, adding more complex problems. But if Natsuki and Takumi do not admit to how they feel about each other honestly, then they may lose each other forever.
- When Takumi finally makes his decision, a major turning point to everyone in Initial D is about to happen ... and a new legend is about to begin.

== Initial D: Battle Stage (2002) ==
- Battle Stage is a compilation of every major street race of 1st, 2nd, and 3rd Stage with the special addition of the never before seen battle between Keisuke's FD and Seiji's Evo IV. All the races from Stage 1 were redone using the newer, more detailed CG technology featured in Third Stage. Vehicles featured in the compilation have their official license names in the First Stage battles since cars weren't licensed at the time First Stage was released. Keisuke's FD retains some of the parts used from the Project D era (Mazdaspeed MS-02 Rims, Mazdaspeed Spoiler) but it still had its Redsuns sticker on it.

== Initial D: Fourth Stage (2004–2006) ==
No. overall	No. in season	English Dub title Japanese titles (translated)	Original release date
44	1	"Project D" "Project D"; Transliteration: "Purojekuto D" (Japanese: プロジェクトD)	April 16, 2004
Takumi Fujiwara has made his decision and joins Ryosuke and Keisuke Takahashi in creating a new race team. Project D has now been formed, and they have only but one goal, to compete against the best drivers in all of the Kanto region. This is the story of how their names became legendary among the streets of touge. The first battle is against Seven Star Leaf (members are Tohru and Atsuro) at their home course, Momiji Line. At the cafe, Tohru's beloved, Nao saying that if Tohru lost the battle, he must promise to stop racing. And the battle between Takumi's 86 and Tohru's Roadster in Downhill is about to begin.
45	2	"Full Throttle! Downhill Battle" "Full Throttle! Downhill Battle"; Transliteration: "Zenkai! Daunhiru Batoru" (Japanese: 全開!ダウンヒルバトル)	April 17, 2004
Takumi and Toru Suetsugu are both reckless drivers, yet there is a big difference in their abilities. It is during this battle that it comes to show why Takumi is one of the double-aces of Project D, as the Eight-Six is ready to overtake Seven Star Leaf's very own Roadster of the downhill using techniques never dreamed possible on the streets. At the end of episode, Daiki is calling Tomoyuki and promised in the name of Todo School, he'll never lose against Project D's downhiller, Takumi Fujiwara.
46	3	"The Most Powerful Man of the Toudou School" "The Most Powerful Man of the Toudou School"; Transliteration: "Tōdō Juku Saikyō no Otoko" (Japanese: 東堂塾最強の男)	June 19, 2004
Project D has now come face to face with racers from the Todo School. This time, Todo will use their wildcard racing students, Daiki Ninomiya with his EK9 and Smiley Sakai with his DC2, as they will use their skills learned in their goal to become pro racers. The pressure in Project D's team has begun, as there is no time to make any mistakes if future battles are going to be like this.
47	4	"Two Pieces of Advice" "Two Words of Advice"; Transliteration: "Futatsu no Adobaisu" (Japanese: 二つのアドバイス)	June 19, 2004
Daiki decides on the position he is going to take in the battle. To ensure a victory, Ryosuke gives Takumi two advices to use against Daiki's EK9, especially if Daiki's level of techniques are that of semi-pros. Everything else is up to the reliance of Takumi's driving skills.
48	5	"The Starting Line to Victory" "Start Line to Victory"; Transliteration: "Shōri e no Sutātorain" (Japanese: 勝利へのスタートライン)	August 21, 2004
Project D gets another call from the Todo Racing School, this time against a pro racer graduate who has just returned. Ryosuke gets a warning from Kyoichi Sudo not to let Project D compete against the pro racer, especially since it's a newly formed team. To his confusion, Ryosuke ponders as to which car should be used against Tomoyuki Tachi, one of Todo's elite graduates. What confuses him more is Kyoichi's warning that if ever they will race Todo, Ryosuke himself must race with his FC.
49	6	"Blind Attack" "Blind Attack"; Transliteration: "Buraindo·Atakku" (Japanese: ブラインド·アタック)	August 22, 2004
Ryosuke has made his decision, and decides to take out the Eight-Six as his gamble. Tomoyuki then demonstrates all of his driving abilities that he learned as a pro using an EK9, but takes for granted that his opponent is a specialist of the streets. Takumi will have to find new ways to overcome some of the greatest barriers of racing in order to win.
50	7	"The Stormy 85 Turbo" "The Stormy Eight-Five Turbo"; Transliteration: "Arashi no Hachigō Tābo" (Japanese: 嵐のハチゴーターボ)	October 15, 2004
A new nightmarish opponent arrives on Mount Akina challenging Takumi in a downhill battle. Also, Itsuki gets a new upgrade for his Eight-Five as it is demonstrated on the downhill.
51	8	"Fateful Battle of FDs" "Fated FD Battle"; Transliteration: "Unmei no FD Batoru" (Japanese: 運命のFDバトル)	October 16, 2004
With two prefectures of Project D completed, they move on towards the prefecture of Saitama, only to discover the difference of the roads compared to Kanto's Gunma and Tochigi counterparts. This time, Keisuke will have to work on his acceleration techniques. However, there seems to be an unexpected twist, as his opponent also drives an FD, and happens to be a girl.
52	9	"Kyoko's Confession" "Kyoko's Confession"; Transliteration: "Kyōko no Kokuhaku" (Japanese: 恭子の告白)	December 17, 2004
Kyoko could not bring to tell her love interest, Keisuke, about how she feels about him. Meanwhile, Nobuhiko Akiyama is chasing after the Eight-Six with his Altezza only to behold the shocking driving techniques Project D's downhill ace, Takumi, can perform.
53	10	"The Saitama Area's Ultimate Weapon" "The Saitama Area's Ultimate Weapon"; Transliteration: "Saitama Eria Saishū Heiki" (Japanese: 埼玉エリア最終兵器)	December 17, 2004
Nobuhiko has devised a new devilish Eight-Six destroyer at the sight of the Cappuccino, and with the addition of a rally racer named Sakamoto, the chance of success for the Northern Saitama Alliance is close to one hundred percent. The next battle Project D will face is going to be in another new level, as chances of a rainy night is taken to notice.
54	11	"Rainy Downhill Battle" "Rainy Downhill Battle"; Transliteration: "Ame no Daunhiru Batoru" (Japanese: 雨のダウンヒルバトル)	February 18, 2005
A new strategy is devised by Ryosuke at the last minute. It seems that the only way Takumi will win the battle in the rain is if he uses the same strategy as a previous opponent he's raced against before. The only problem to this is Takumi gets confused on what to do, as the rain is making it even more difficult during the race against the Cappuccino, uncertain of the advantage.
55	12	"Straightaway of Struggles" "Straights of Struggles"; Transliteration: "Kattō no Sutorēto" (Japanese: 葛藤のストレート)	February 19, 2005
The final segments of the rainy race is at hand as Takumi now begins to perform the most daring attacks against the insane corner-attacking Cappuccino. But as it seems that Sakamoto is not willing to give Takumi any chances for a sure-fire victory.
56	13	"Motivation" "Motivation"; Transliteration: "Mochibēshon" (Japanese: モチベーション)	April 15, 2005
The rain continues to pour down towards the next battle where Keisuke's FD competes against Wataru's newly upgraded Eight-Six. Instead, it only gets far more intense and time consuming as it keeps raining harder and harder. Then, just like Takumi predicted, the race ends in a split second along one of the wider corners of the pass.
57	14	"Sad Lonely Driver" "Sad Lonely Driver"; Transliteration: "Kanashiki Ronrī Doraibā" (Japanese: 悲しきロンリードライバー)	April 16, 2005
Takumi wakes up for his usual tofu delivery when he recognizes the sight of the Impreza in front of him. Suddenly, everything he knows about his Eight-Six begins to collapse. Elsewhere, Itsuki Takeuchi is out on a date with Kazumi Akiyama, but he might be going too far with his date when there is more to the story.
58	15	"4WD Complex" "4WD Complex"; Transliteration: "4WD Konpurekkusu" (Japanese: 4WDコンプレックス)	June 17, 2005
Takumi continues to struggle between the difference of his Eight-Six and the Impreza's awesome 4WD capabilities. Surprisingly, he gets a tip in starting to solve this problem from an unexpected ex-rival. Now Project D has come to meet with their next opponents, a pair of Lan Evos. However a deadly trap that will turn the tides has been set against them. This puts the practice on a risky hold.
59	16	"Hillclimb of Fury" "Angry Hill Climb"; Transliteration: "Ikari no Hiru·Kuraimu" (Japanese: 怒りのヒル·クライム)	June 18, 2005
Keisuke is uncertain what to do now that the trap has become a success in his opponent's favor. Nonetheless, he fights to find alternate ways to accomplish his goals, but fails with little success. Instead of giving up, an unexpected source arrives to his aid, but the question is whether or not Keisuke would break the code of the RedSuns to compete with his pride as a Project D racer.
60	17	"The Saitama Area's Final Battle" "The Saitama Area's Final Battle"; Transliteration: "Saitama Eria Saishū Kessen" (Japanese: 埼玉エリア最終決戦)	August 19, 2005
It seems that the Lan Evo team will continue to do everything to win the battles, even if they have to resort to dirty tricks. That's just exactly what the next Lan Evo driver told Takumi, to give the Project D driver a warning of what is to come. If Takumi wants to complete the Saitama battles of Project D, then he will have to make a choice whether to heed the warning or not.
61	18	"Last Drive" "Last Drive"; Transliteration: "Rasuto·Doraibu" (Japanese: ラスト·ドライブ)	August 20, 2005
While his FD is in the shop being upgraded, Keisuke and Kyoko go out on a date. Afterwards, Keisuke test-drives his FD, as his acceleration skills has finally paid off in unleashing this new vehicle's monstrous power.
62	19	"God Foot and God Arm" "God Foot and God Arm"; Transliteration: "Goddo Futto to Goddo Āmu" (Japanese: ゴッドフットとゴッドアーム)	October 14, 2005
Now that Project D is now recognized as street racers worthy of competing against high levels, they have to venture out much farther to meet greater rivals in the streets. Purple Shadow, a legendary pair of street racers in the Ibaraki Prefecture have come back out of retirement to prove that they can still hold the title of gods of the streets.
63	20	"The Unmatched GT-R!" "Transcendent GT-R!"; Transliteration: "Chōzetsu GT-R!" (Japanese: 超絶GT-R!)	October 15, 2005
Keisuke agrees to Kōzō "God Foot" Hoshino's request in making the uphill battle rule different, until Ryosuke tells him that this is in favor of the FD. This makes Keisuke feel a lot of pressure concerning Hoshino's true intentions, as the battle between his newly modified FD is put to its first test against God Foot's newly purchased next generation R34 GT-R.
64	21	"Dogfight" "Dogfight"; Transliteration: "Doggufaito" (Japanese: ドッグファイト)	December 16, 2005
The battle between the FD and GT-R continues, however the real battle has just begun. Now, Hoshino demonstrates his unique driving skills that people call the impossible earning him the name God Foot. This makes Keisuke's true racing abilities appear when it is pushed beyond his limits as both drivers begin to drive recklessly forcing the battle to be settled in more than just one battle.
65	22	"The Sorcerer of the Single-Handed Steer" "Wizard of the One-Hand Steer"; Transliteration: "Wanhando Sutea no Majutsu" (Japanese: ワンハンドステアの魔術)	December 16, 2005
As the battle between the super powered cars of the hillclimb has ended, Takumi's battle is another story. Takumi realizes that his opponent has the same frightening aura that the Impreza driver had, making his battle with Dr. Toshiya "God Arm" Joushima more difficult. This time, it's street racing skills against another form of street racing skills.
66	23	"Endless Battle" "Endless Battle"; Transliteration: "Endoresu Batoru" (Japanese: エンドレスバトル)	February 17, 2006
The battle between Takumi's Eight-Six and Toshiya's S2000 has become a battle of the best endurance. Yet Ryosuke suspects that something is not quite right about the battle, rather he finds out late on what has just happened. Now that the battle has stretched for far too long, God Arm gets serious and shows off his true driving skills when he is at the peak of his full potential.
67	24	"Never-Ending Challenge" "The Challenge Without End"; Transliteration: "Owaranai Chōsen" (Japanese: 終わらない挑戦)	February 17, 2006
The dramatic conclusion between the Eight-Six and S2000 is at hand. Now that God Arm has gotten serious, Takumi will compensate into winning, by allowing the Eight-Six to hold itself together, knowing that only risky maneuvers are the only way to success. After the episode, it fades to black with a message saying "See you again."

== Initial D: Battle Stage 2 (2007) ==
- Battle Stage 2 is a compilation of races from 4th stage including never before seen battles between Keisuke's FD versus Smiley Sakai's DC2 Integra Type R, and Keisuke's FD versus Atsuro Kawai's ER34 (R34 GTT).

== Initial D: Extra Stage 2 (2008) ==
- As Mako and Sayuki's reputation as the fastest on Mount Usui steadily grows, Mako is unsatisfied with Usui and is planning to become a pro racer.
- Iketani, now an improved street racer, yet again had a chance meeting with Mako, who gives Iketani another chance to meet with her where they first met.
- Two guys in a black Altezza challenge Mako and Sayuki in a race where they realize that the two girls are no small-time racers.
- Iketani is ready to meet with Mako as he waits for her when something happens that again results in Iketani not being able to meet Mako at the correct time. The two do meet up, after Mako picks Iketani up when he suffers a punctured tire.
- Iketani, when hearing of Mako's possible future, withholds his feelings so that Mako can make "the right decision".
- Mako makes her decision to go pro for a year, but not without giving Sayuki, as well as Mount Usui, the run of their lives.
- At the end, after the credits, it is stated that Mako and Iketani never meet again.

== Initial D: Fifth Stage (2012–2013) ==
No. overall	No. in season	Title	Original release date
70	1	"Encounter of Destiny" "Fateful Encounter"; Transliteration: "Unmei no Deai" (Japanese: 運命の出会い)	November 9, 2012 (2012-11-04, sneak peek on Animax)
Following their narrow victory against Purple Shadow, Project D's reputation is at stake after a pair of imposters parade around Saitama. Initially Takumi seems oblivious to the incident, but takes notice after he is mistakenly blamed for taking advantage of a girl. Meanwhile, the final stage of Project D's expeditions is upon them, and is to be the hardest yet.
71	2	"The New Battlefield" "New Battlefield"; Transliteration: "Aratanaru Senjō" (Japanese: 新たなる戦場)	November 9, 2012
Takumi receives an apology the following morning after exposing the imposters. The first stage of Project D's Kanagawa expeditions is against Team 246: Satoshi Omiya and Kobayakawa. Although racing for their own pride, 246 are actually part of a grand plan initiated by Team Sidewinder's Go Hojo and Eiji Kubo. As the uphill race begins, Kobayakawa is about to be shown the true ability of Keisuke Takahashi.
72	3	"Dead Line" "Dead Line"; Transliteration: "Deddo・Rain" (Japanese: デッド・ライン)	December 14, 2012
As the first battle winds down, the downhill between Takumi's Eight-Six and Omiya's NB8C Roadster begins. As both cars reach their limits, the control of the drivers will determine the outcome. Against Omiya's miraculous car control, will Takumi be able to win? Another factor will come into play.
73	4	"Revenge Battle of Fate" "Fated Revenge Battle"; Transliteration: "In'nen no Ribenji Batoru" (Japanese: 因縁のリベンジバトル)	December 14, 2012
Kanagawa's Second Line will be against RT Katagiri, where Takumi encounters Kai Kogashiwa: a former rival from Irohazaka; graduated from street racing and now a professional racer with his MR-S. However, Takumi is starting to show a "Zone" that had evolved from the Purple Shadow races, a zone that even Ryosuke cannot explain. The winner of this race is up in the air.
74	5	"Fujiwara Zone" "Fujiwara Zone"; Transliteration: "Fujiwara Zōn" (Japanese: 藤原ゾーン)	January 11, 2013
As the battle heats up, both Takumi and Kai both use all of their ability, and then some, to battle for the win. In the next battle, Keisuke puts his new accelerator techniques to the test against Minagawa's Supra. But as Ryosuke explains, there is another purpose of this training that would allow him to beat the "super-orthodox" pro racer.
75	6	"Keisuke's Determination" "Keisuke's Pride"; Transliteration: "Keisuke no Iji" (Japanese: 啓介の意地)	January 11, 2013
As it appears that the FD vs. Supra battle is giving no quarter, the question is, is it possible for Keisuke to hold off Minagawa's professional pressure? Meanwhile a new racer appears on the slopes of Hakone, and its evident he wants to kill himself, and take anybody with him!
76	7	"Zero Hearts" "Mindset of Nothingness"; Transliteration: "Mu no Kokoro" (Japanese: 無（ゼロ）の心)	February 8, 2013
Keisuke's next opponent in Kanagawa's Four Lines of Defense is the leader of Team Spiral, Ryuji "Zero" Ikeda. Ikeda believes in his "Zero Theory", where the driver thinks of nothing except being one with the car to create the ultimate racer. Quite similar to Ryosuke's Fastest Racer Theory, Ryosuke also notices a few flaws in Ikeda's theory. A flaw that would arise as the wet conditions create a fog battle.
77	8	"White Devil" "White Demon"; Transliteration: "Shiroi Akuma" (Japanese: 白い悪魔)	February 9, 2013
The downhill battle between Takumi and Hiroya "Zero 1" Okuyama's S15 starts, with Okuyama waiting to attack until the later section because of the fog. However, he hasn't considered the ability of Takumi's adaptibility skills. Whilst this is on, another battle is in the midst: Ryosuke's inevitable battle with the driver known as 'Shinigami', Rin Hojo.
78	9	"Shinigami" "Grim Reaper" (Japanese: 死神)	March 8, 2013
The destined battle between Ryosuke and Rin 'Shinigami' Hojo has begun, over a girl named Kaori. As the race progresses on, the story of Ryosuke, Hojo and Kaori is revealed. And as Ikeda of Spiral Zero spectates the race from behind, it's obvious that this race of fate has quickly risen well beyond dangerous.
79	10	"Full Stop" "Full Stop"; Transliteration: "Shūshifu" (Japanese: 終止符)	March 9, 2013
As the battle get more dangerous, several confessions come into play that create the full picture behind the feud between Ryosuke and Rin, and how Rin's actions played a huge part in Kaori's suicide. But as they approach the end of the track, Rin's tires and brakes are completely shot, turning his R32 into an unstoppable weapon. What's going to happen and can Ryosuke escape?!
80	11	"Full Stop, Continued..." "Full Stop, and Beyond"; Transliteration: "Shūshifu, Soshite......" (Japanese: 終止符、そして......)	April 12, 2013
As the out-of-control FC and R32 hurtle down the mountain, only a miracle can stop these two missiles from spectacularly crashing! Meanwhile, Project D prepares for their last battle of Kanagawa against the secretive Team Sidewinder. That is, until the SpeedStars find out that Takumi's opponent will be an Eight-Six.
81	12	"Brothers" "Brothers"; Transliteration: "Burazāsu" (Japanese: ブラザーズ)	April 13, 2013
The final battles for Project D are here, and it all starts with the uphill battle between Keisuke's FD and Go Hojo's NSX. But as Rin understands, there is a fundamental difference between his younger brother and Keisuke, one that might determine this race.
82	13	"Unexpected Battle" "Battle Beyond Expectations"; Transliteration: "Sōtei-gai Batoru" (Japanese: 想定外バトル)	May 10, 2013
The battle between Keisuke and Go continues. Keisuke's good run behind Go led to many feeling unbelievable, including Go himself. Then entering the second round, the match gets more intense. Who will take this uphill climb battle?
83	14	"Conclusion! Extreme Hill Climb" "End of the Ultimate Hill Climb"; Transliteration: "Ketchaku! Kyokugen Hiru Kuraimu" (Japanese: 決着！極限ヒルクライム)	May 10, 2013
The intense hill climb battle between Keisuke and Go Hojo is coming to the end of second round. Keisuke engages in attack mode and Go starts to get tense. Meanwhile, Shinji Inui has revealed to especially Mako and Sayuki, who has been with him, that he would be the racer of the downhill battle against Takumi. The episode ends with Takumi racing against Shinji as both AE86 cars passing the screen as the race begins, it fades to black with a notice of the next battle coming soon on the next stage of the anime, hinting that the true conclusion of the race will have to wait.

== Initial D: Final Stage (2014) ==
No. overall	No. in season	Title	Original release date
84	1	"Natural" "Natural"; Transliteration: "Nachuraru" (Japanese: ナチュラル)	May 16, 2014
Takumi and Shinji's match thus kicks off on an instant. Shinji is given the lead. Bunta steps out of the tofu shop and breaks his keypouch after accidentally dropping it. Bunta speculates an unfortunate event that will happen. Shinji starts to show his dormant power, leaving Takumi to be shocked himself.
85	2	"The Strongest Enemy" "Strongest Opponent"; Transliteration: "Saikyō no Teki" (Japanese: 最強の敵)	May 17, 2014
Takumi and Shinji continue with their match while Takumi, still bewildered by Shinji, starts to focus. But suddenly, Shinji allows Takumi to pass, which disturbs Takumi even more. Even Kubo is utterly disheartened by the turn of events, but both Gou and Ryosuke believe that this was inevitable, creating a suitable conclusion to Project D's expeditions.
86	3	"Dangerous Scent" "Scent of Danger"; Transliteration: "Kiken'na Nioi" (Japanese: 危険な匂い)	June 22, 2014
Both drivers are equally strong, towards the middle of the race. They face a battle of gaining the lead.
87	4	"Dream" "Dream"; Transliteration: "Dorīmu" (Japanese: ドリーム)	June 23, 2014
The intense downhill battle between the two drivers are reaching an end, as Takumi and Shinji race to their absolute limits. As this battle comes to a close, and the reign of Project D finally ends, the true meaning behind the "D" will be revealed. As the characters go on different paths, Takumi's passion to be "the fastest one out there" will never end.

== Initial D: Battle Stage 3 (2021) ==
Initial D: Battle Stage 3 is the eleventh and final installment of the Initial D series. It features every race from the Fifth Stage and the Final Stage. Unlike the previous two battle stages, it does not feature any new battles, and doesn't feature any character dialogue.

== Home release ==
The series was released on DVD.

List of Initial D videos released by Tokyopop (Region 1), VDI Entertainment (Region 2) and Madman Entertainment (Region 4)
Volume	Episodes	Release date (Region 1)	Release date (Region 2)	Release date (Region 4)
Battle 01, Akina's Downhill Specialist	First Stage, Eps. 1–3	September 16, 2003	March 31, 2008	2004
Battle 02, Challenge: Red Suns	First Stage, Eps. 4–6	October 14, 2003	March 31, 2008	2004
Battle 03, Challenge: Night Kids	First Stage, Eps. 7–9	January 13, 2004	March 31, 2008	2004
Battle 04, Myogi's Downhill Technician	First Stage, Eps. 10–12	March 9, 2004		2004
Battle 05, Duct Tape Death Match	First Stage, Eps. 13–15	May 11, 2004		2004
Battle 06, Asphalt Angels	First Stage, Eps. 16–18	July 13, 2004		2004
Battle 07, The End of Summer	First Stage, Eps. 19–21	September 14, 2004		
Battle 08, Battles in the Rain (also Rain Battle)	First Stage, Eps. 22–24	November 9, 2004		
Battle 09, Akina's Superstar Challenge	First Stage/Second Stage, Eps. 25–27	January 11, 2005		2005
Battle 10, Team Emperor	Second Stage, Ep. 28–30	March 8, 2005		2005
Battle 11, Blow-out	Second Stage, Ep. 31–33	May 10, 2005		2007
Battle 12, Secret Weapon	Second Stage, Ep. 34–36	July 12, 2005		
Battle 13, Battle of the Souls	Second Stage, Ep. 37–39	September 13, 2005		
Battle 14, Extra stage	Extra Stage, Ep. 1–2	November 8, 2005		

List of Initial D videos released by Funimation (Region 1)
Volume	Episodes	DVD Release date
First Stage, part 1	First Stage, Eps. 1–13	2010
First Stage, part 2	First Stage, Eps. 14–26	2010
Second Stage	Second Stage, Eps. 1–13 + 2 Extra Stage OVAs	2011
Third Stage	Third Stage film	2010
Fourth Stage, part 1	Fourth Stage, Eps. 1–12	2010
Fourth Stage, part 2	Fourth Stage, Eps. 13–24	2010
First Stage S.A.V.E. Edition	First Stage, Eps. 1–26	2011
Second & Third Stage + OVA Extra Stage S.A.V.E. Edition	Second Stage (Eps. 1–13) + Third Stage (film) + 2 Extra Stage OVAs	2011
Fourth Stage S.A.V.E. Edition	Fourth Stage, Eps. 1–24	2011
