= Love Me Again (Land Down Under) =

2008 Filipino romantic drama film

- Theatrical movie poster
- Directed by: Rory Quintos
- Screenplay by: Arah Jell Badayos; Jewel C. Castro
- Story by: Jewel C. Castro
- Produced by: Charo Santos-Concio; Malou N. Santos
- Starring: Piolo Pascual; Angel Locsin
- Cinematography: Charlie Peralta
- Edited by: Marya Ignacio
- Music by: Raul Mitra
- Production company: Star Cinema
- Distributed by: Star Cinema
- Release dates: December 6, 2008 (United States); January 15, 2009 (Philippines)
- Country: Philippines
- Language: Filipino
- Box office: ₱72,179,995.00

Love Me Again (Land Down Under) is a 2008 Philippine romantic drama film starring Angel Locsin with Piolo Pascual released under Star Cinema. The film was directed by award-winning film director Rory Quintos.

Love Me Again had its world premiere in Los Angeles on December 6, 2008 and in San Francisco, California on December 7, 2008. It opened in Philippine theaters last January 15, 2009. This film is the first ever Philippine film with an all cast of Filipinos to be shown in a premiere in the United States and this is also the first big-screen team-up of Piolo Pascual and Angel Locsin after the success of Lobo that ended on July 11 5-6 months later.

== Plot ==
Arah (Angel Locsin) dreams of a better life—different from the life she knows in Bukidnon. Ranches everywhere are closing one by one. The glory her hometown once knew was slowly disappearing in favour of life abroad, particularly in Australia. Arah believes this too. Australia will save them from poverty. But Migo (Piolo Pascual) does not share this belief. He believes that Bukidnon’s glory will return if only people didn’t leave.

When Arah’s father suddenly encounters an accident, Arah is left with no choice but to seek better opportunities to earn money. Arah, in desperation accepts money from the Australian rancher Brian in exchange for a contract. Her decision breaks Migo’s heart. The two part ways, their problems unresolved.

With the help of her co-workers, especially her newfound friend, Ina (a Filipina working there as a cook), Arah slowly adjusted to the life in Australia. She is willing to hold her ground and tough it up along with the boys just to fulfill her dreams for herself and her family. It was this determination that caught the attention of the cold and mysterious Brian.

Meanwhile, Migo was experiencing his own wave of reality. Bukidnon is not what it used to be. And fighting to keep a ranch alive and working is something he cannot do without enough experience. Despite his enthusiasm and hard work, his investments crumble slowly until he is left with nothing but a humbling realization—there is money in Australia, but his dreams shouldn’t really end there. Migo decides to give the land down under a try. With fierce hopes of earning back what he lost, he flies to Australia, to the land where his beloved Arah went when she left him for her dreams.

Suddenly, Migo’s presence at the ranch is making Arah suspicious. It’s been years—why is he suddenly there? But destiny has other plans for the two. By a simple twist of fate, the two are thrown together on an errand. The close proximity forces the two to confront their past. And undeniably, their feelings for each other resurface.

Will Migo let Arah in her heart again or will she let him go completely for the sake of Brian and her family? And will Migo find the courage to fight for her or learn to accept that he has lost her forever?

== Cast ==
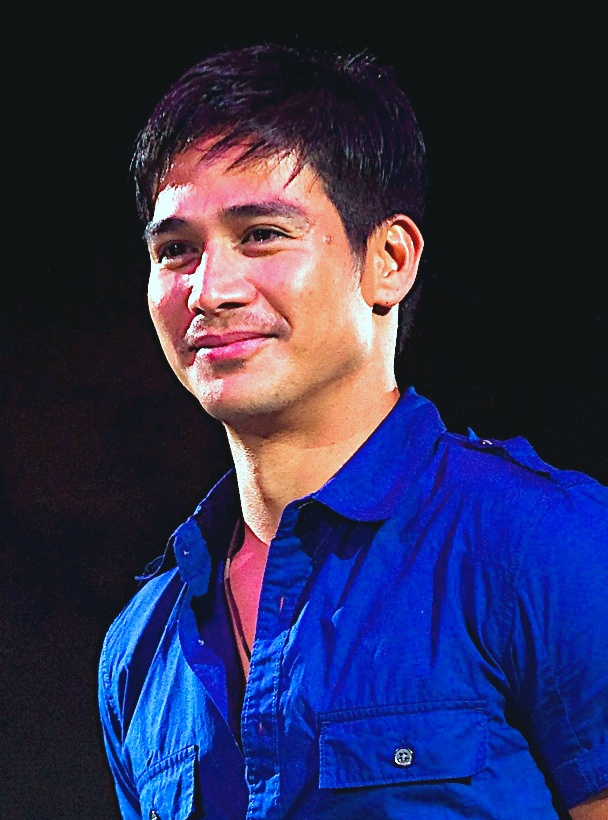
Piolo Pascual portrays Migo

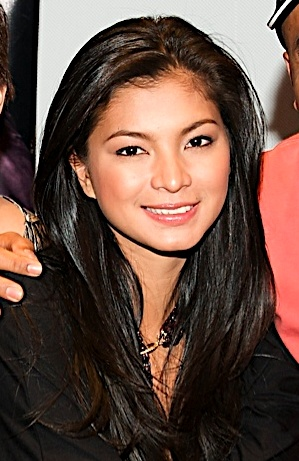
Angel Locsin portrays Arah

- Piolo Pascual as Migo
- Angel Locsin as Arah
- Ricky Davao as Wayne
- Ronnie Lazaro as Dodong
- Dimples Romana as Yna
- Erich Gonzales as Lovely
- Nash Aguas as Ariel
- John Manalo as Anthony
- Brent Metken as Brian
- AJ Dee as Koboy
- Chanda Romero as Migo's mother
- Dominic Ochoa as Migo's brother

== Production ==
The cast, including Angel Locsin and Piolo Pascual, trained for weeks in horseback riding at the Manila Polo Club under the guidance of couturiers Vic Barba and Mikee Cojuangco. The film was shot in Impasugong and Malaybalay, Bukidnon and also in Darwin, Northern Territory, Australia.

The film was retitled from Land Down Under to Love Me Again.

== Reception ==
Land Down Under has a total gross of ₱ 65.1 million, according to Box Office Mojo.
