= The General's Daughter (TV series) =

2019 Philippine television action drama series

- Title card
- Genre: Action; Drama; Military fiction
- Created by: Rondel P. Lindayag; Danica Mae S. Domingo
- Written by: David Franche Diuco; Li Candelaria; Adrelle Emil V. Alfonso; Hazel Karyl Madanguit; Ma. Nica A. Romero; Mark Bunda; China Gabriel; Andrian Legaspi
- Directed by: Emmanuel Q. Palo; Mervyn B. Brondial; Darnel Joy R. Villaflor
- Starring: Angel Locsin; Tirso Cruz III; Albert Martinez; Janice de Belen; Eula Valdez; Paulo Avelino; Arjo Atayde; JC de Vera; Ryza Cenon; Maricel Soriano
- Opening theme: "Ikaw ang Aking Mahal" by Regine Velasquez-Alcasid
- Composer: Ogie Alcasid
- Country of origin: Philippines
- Original language: Filipino
- No. of seasons: 1
- No. of episodes: 183 (list of episodes)

Production
- Executive producers: Carlo Katigbak; Cory Vidanes; Laurenti Dyogi; Roldeo Endrinal
- Producers: Hazel Bolisay Parfan; Eleanor Martinez
- Editor: Rommel Malimban
- Running time: 25–38 minutes
- Production company: Dreamscape Entertainment Television

Original release
- Network: ABS-CBN
- Release: January 21 – October 4, 2019

The General's Daughter is a 2019 Philippine television drama action series broadcast by ABS-CBN. Directed by Emmanuel Q. Palo, Mervyn B. Brondial and Darnel Joy R. Villaflor, it stars Angel Locsin in the title role. It aired on the network's Primetime Bida line up and worldwide on TFC from January 21 to October 4, 2019, replacing Ngayon at Kailanman and was replaced by Starla.

== Plot ==
2nd LT Rhian Bonifacio is an AFP Military Nurse dedicated to save lives. Beneath her benevolent exterior, however, lies a secret - she's a spy, trained by her very own father, "Heneral" Santiago Guerrero, to exact revenge against his sworn enemy, BGen. Marcial de Leon, the commander of the Northern Command of the AFP.

Unbeknownst to Rhian, she has been living a lie - that the father she has known and loved all her life was the enemy all along and has trained her to be used as a weapon against her real father. Having been indoctrinated to believe in the nobility of Tiago's cause, Rhian will be caught in the crossfire between Tiago's cell and the AFP. Rhian will find herself struggling between her love for her false family and the dictates of her conscience.

== Cast and characters ==
=== Main cast ===
- Angel Locsin as 1st Lt. Rhian "Uno" Bonifacio, PA / Arabella de Leon / Diana Guerrero (Note: Born Arabella de Leon, she was first given the name "Diana Guerrero" after Heneral Tiago abducted her and led her to believe that she was his biological daughter. As part of the mission given to her by Tiago to infiltrate the AFP and to kill Marcial, she went under the alias "Rhian Bonifacio." While she suffered from amnesia, she was given the name "Dyosa" by Elai and the people of Barrio Sto. Francisco. She also carried the title "Uno," being the top trainee of Tiago Guerrero's terrorist youth camp.)
  - Ashley Sarmiento as young Diana / Rhian
    - Francine Diaz as teen Rhian
- Tirso Cruz III as Lieutenant General Santiago "Heneral Tiago" Guerrero Sr., AFP
  - Bernard Palanca as young Tiago
- Albert Martinez as Brigadier General Marcial de Leon, AFP
  - Joseph Bitangcol as young Marcial
- Janice de Belen as Amelia Montemayor-Guerrero
  - Roxanne Guinoo as young Amelia
- Eula Valdes as Corazon de Leon
  - Meg Imperial as young Corazon
- Paulo Avelino as Franco "Dos" Segismundo
  - Brando Axl as young Franco
    - Louise Abuel as teen Franco
- Arjo Atayde as Elijah "Elai" Sarmiento
- JC de Vera as Maj. Ethan del Fierro, PA
- Ryza Cenon as 2nd Lt. Jessica "Jessie" de Leon-del Fierro, PA
- Maricel Soriano as Isabel "Nanang Sabel" Sarmiento
- Jeffrey Santos as Colonel Michael Dalagan, PA
- Richard Quan as Colonel Sherwin Esguerra, PA
- Jett Pangan as Colonel Jonathan Eulogio, PA

=== Supporting cast ===
- Loisa Andalio as Claire del Fierro
- Ronnie Alonte as Ivan Cañega
- Art Acuña as Armando Segismundo
  - Rino Marco as young Armando
- Archie Adamos as BGen. Lorenzo Buencamino, AFP
- Richard Manabat as BGen. Orlando Mangiliman, AFP
- Cholo Barretto as 1st Lt. Joselito "Jopet" Ramirez, PA
- Kim Molina as 2nd Lt. Maria Lilybeth "Billet" Abarquez, PA
- Tess Antonio as Cora Apostol
- May Bayot as Fedelina Catacutan
- Amy Nobleza as Lea "Ekang" Apostol
- Anne Feo as Helen del Fierro
- Marc Santiago as Santino "Santi" M. Guerrero
- Avery Balasbas as Aradella "Ara" De Leon
- Nico Antonio as Andrew "Andoy" Apostol
- Kate Alejandrino as Lt. Adelina Manlangit, PA
- Rafael "Paeng" Sudayan as Papi
- Jim Bergado as Barog
- Lilygem Yulores as Joselyn
- John Steven de Guzman as Tom-Tom
- Luz Valdez as Gloria
- Patrick Quiroz as Amir

=== Guest cast ===
- Ruben Maria Soriquez as David Pascal
- Menggie Cobarrubias as Mayor Manuel Sta. Maria
- Leo Rialp as Oscar Villavicencio
- Rolly Inocencio as Mang Eugene
- Jomari Angeles as Caloy
- Dido de la Paz as George Catacutan
- Kiko Matos as Salvador "Buddy" Banzon
- Rendon Labrador as Lt. Joseph Peralta, PA
- Giovanni Baldisseri as Roman Esguerra
- Dionne Monsanto as Vera "Ms. Poison" Sangre
- Jong Cuenco as Bernardo "Mr. Mogul" Tuazon
- Nonie Buencamino as BGen. Gregorio "Greg" Maximillano
  - Jerome Ponce as young Greg
- Janice Hung as Capt. Alexandra "Cuatro" Noblejas, PA
- Tart Carlos as Bekbek
- Apollo Abraham as Tiago's lawyer
- Ces dela Cruz-Guevara as Elvira Ricaforte
- Wilmar Peñaflorida as Tiago's henchman
- Claire Ruiz as Tintin
- Chai Fonacier as Irene
- Patrick Sugui as Banjo
- Lou Veloso as Amor
- Darwin "Hap Rice" Tolentino as Tomas
- Mark "Big Mac" Andaya as Jack
- Mercedes Cabral as Senator Gabriela "Cinco" Sta. Ana
- Victor Silayan as Zandro "Tres" Abellanosa / Wilson Montino
- Javi Benitez as Vladimir Lejano
- Emilio Garcia as Mayor Dante Velario
- Rochelle Barrameda as Irma Velario
- Lara Morena as Adelfa Dimaranan

== Broadcast ==
The General's Daughter premiered on January 21, 2019, which was simulcast worldwide on iWant and YouTube. The show aired on ABS-CBN's Primetime Bida evening block and worldwide via TFC.

Before the conclusion of the show, it was picked up by the Myanmar-based Sky Net which airs the same over Myanmar.

=== Reruns ===
Reruns of The General's Daughter were aired on Kapamilya Channel from June 15, 2020 to January 15, 2021, replacing the rerun of Walang Hanggan on former ABS-CBN's timeslot and was replaced by the rerun of Asintado.

The series had reruns on Jeepney TV from May 16 to September 16, 2022, replacing the rerun of The Wedding and was replaced by the rerun of The Blood Sisters. It also aired simultaneously with ALLTV from December 2, 2024 to August 8, 2025, replacing the rerun of On the Wings of Love and was replaced by the rerun of Ang sa Iyo ay Akin.

== Production ==
=== Casting ===
The initial cast of the series, which included Angel Locsin, Maricel Soriano, Janice de Belen, Eula Valdez and Ryza Cenon who had just transferred from the GMA Network, was announced by Dreamscape Entertainment Head Deo Endrinal via Instagram on April 12, 2018. The series would be officially unveiled in November 2018 during ABS-CBN's Family is Love trade event.

The series was first developed around 2014 or 2015, and underwent numerous changes before making it to air in 2019. The biggest change made being that the Rhian Bonifacio character was supposed to be a member of the Navy Seals, which was different from the member of the Army Nurse Corps that the character ended up becoming.

Angel Locsin was the first and sole choice for the role of Rhian Bonifacio. According to Dreamscape's creative head, Rondel Lindayag, only Locsin had the angst to portray the character perfectly. However, Locsin could not accept the role early in its development because she was tied to star in a Darna which was supposed to have been directed by Erik Matti. Locsin would eventually be forced out of the role after suffering a disc bulge on her back. Thereafter, Locsin did not star in another TV series to rehabilitate her back as well as having gone through a break-up with former boyfriend Luis Manzano; the lone exception thereto being a supporting role in La Luna Sangre, which was a sequel to the Locsin-starrers Lobo and Imortal.

The role of Marcial de Leon was originally offered to Cesar Montano, who declined the role as he was, at the time, the COO of the Tourism Promotion Board, an attached agency of the Department of Tourism. Richard Gomez was next approached to play the role, but he likewise turned down the offer in order to prepare for his bid for reelection as Mayor of Ormoc. Lastly they tried to offer Christopher de Leon to play the role but most likely declined it in order to prepare his TV Show in GMA Network TODA One I Love. The role would eventually be begged by Albert Martinez who was then a part of Kadenang Ginto, he'd later appear concurrently on both shows.

The series was billed as the "biggest teleserye of 2019" in terms of the cast, the mounting of the drama, the mounting of the action, and the mounting of the interaction between components of the story.

== Reception ==
During its near 9-month run, The General's Daughter was a consistent top rater, second only to perrenial ratings hit FPJ's Ang Probinsyano. Its pilot rating of 34.0% was considered impressive considering that the episode aired on simulcast with its online platforms. The series would then register a higher number, 35.1%, on its second episode. The series would hit its peak on May 16, 2019, as it scored a rating of 36.7%. The show would make history on its September 6, 2019, episode as it placed number 1 on Kantar Media, displacing FPJ's Ang Probinsyano to number 2 for the first time since its debut in 2015; on that broadcast, The General's Daughter scored 32.8% to FPJ's Ang Probinsyano's 32.4%. The series would conclude on a high note, registering a rating 35.9%.

Kantar Media National TV Ratings (8:45PM PST)
Pilot Episode	Finale Episode	Peak	Average
34.0% January 21, 2019	35.9% October 4, 2019	36.7% May 16, 2019	31.5%

== Accolades ==
Year	Recipient	Award-giving Body	Award	Result
2019-2020	Angel Locsin	Gawad Filipino Awards	Natatanging Filipina sa Larangan ng Pag- Arte	Won
2019-2020	Angel Locsin	Mindanao State University Kabantugan Awards	Most Favorite TV Actress	Won
2019-2020	Angel Locsin	Young Educators' Convergence of Soccsksargen Inc, (YECS) Aral Parangal	Best TV Actress	Won
2019-2020	Angel Locsin	Alta Media Icon Awards	Most Influential Female TV Personality	Won
2019-2020	Angel Locsin	9th EdukCircle	Best Actress in a TV Series	Won
2019-2020	Angel Locsin	33rd PMPC Star Awards for Television	Best Drama Actress	Won
2019-2020	Angel Locsin	Lion HearTV's Rawr Awards 2019	Actress of the Year	Won
2019-2020	Angel Locsin	Lion HearTV's Rawr Awards 2019	Favorite Bida	Won
2019-2020	Angel Locsin	Gawad Lasallianeta	Most Outstanding Female TV Lead Dramatic Actress	Won
2019-2020	Angel Locsin	4th GEMS Hiyas ng Sining Award	Highest Honors for Television (Aktres)	Won
2019-2020	Angel Locsin	1st VP Choice	TV Actress of the Year	Won
2019-2020	Angel Locsin	51st Box Office Entertainment Awards	TV Actress of the Year	Won
2019-2020	Angel Locsin; Maricel Soriano; Tirso Cruz III; Albert Martinez; Janice de Belen; Eula Valdez; Paulo Avelino; JC de Vera; Ryza Cenon	51st Box Office Entertainment Awards	Best Acting Ensemble in a Drama Series	Won
2019-2020	Tirso Cruz III	Asian Academy Creative Awards	Best Actor in a Supporting Role (Regional)	Won
2019-2020	Tirso Cruz III	Asian Academy Creative Awards	Best Actor in a Supporting Role (Overall)	Nominated
2019-2020	Tirso Cruz III	51st Box Office Entertainment Awards	TV Best Supporting Actor	Won
2019-2020	Albert Martinez	9th EdukCircle	Best Supporting Actor	Won
2019-2020	Eula Valdez	9th EdukCircle	Best Supporting Actress	Won
2019-2020	Janice de Belen	33rd PMPC Star Awards for Television	Best Drama Supporting Actress	Won
2019-2020	Arjo Atayde	33rd PMPC Star Awards for Television	Best Drama Supporting Actor	Won
2019-2020	Ryza Cenon	9th OFW Gawad Parangal	Best Supporting Actress	Won
2019-2020	Paulo Avelino	3rd Laguna Excellence Awards		Won
2019-2020	The General's Daughter	Young Educators' Convergence of Soccsksargen Inc, (YECS) Aral Parangal	Best Primetime TV Series	Won
2019-2020	The General's Daughter	Parangal Paulinian 2019	Natatanging Dramang Pantelebisyon	Won
2019-2020	The General's Daughter		Top 1 Teleserye on Twitter (April - July 2019)	Won
2019-2020	The General's Daughter	5th EVSU - OCC Student's Choice Mass Media Awards	Best Magazine TV Series	Won
2019-2020	The General's Daughter	33rd PMPC Star Awards for Television	Best Primetime TV Series	Won
2019-2020	The General's Daughter	Asian Academy Creative Awards	Best Telenovela or Soap Opera Series (Regional)	Won
2019-2020	The General's Daughter	Asian Academy Creative Awards	Best Telenovela or Soap Opera Series (Overall)	Nominated
2019-2020	The General's Daughter	Lion HearTV's Rawr Awards 2019	Bet na Bet na Teleserye	Won
2019-2020	The General's Daughter	The Platinum Stallion Media Awards 2019	Best Primetime Show	Won
2019-2020	The General's Daughter	4th GEMS Hiyas ng Sining	Best TV Series	Won
2019-2020	The General's Daughter	Anak TV	Household Favorite TV Program	Won

== See also ==
- List of programs broadcast by ABS-CBN
- List of ABS-CBN Studios original drama series
