= The Promise (2007 film) =

- Official movie poster
- Directed by: Mike Tuviera
- Written by: Raquel N. Villavicencio
- Based on: Hihintayin Kita sa Langit by Carlos Siguion Reyna; Wuthering Heights by Emily Brontë
- Produced by: Jose Mari Abacan; Roselle Monteverde-Teo; Annette Gozon-Abrogar; Lily Y. Monteverde
- Starring: Richard Gutierrez; Angel Locsin
- Cinematography: Marissa Floirendo
- Edited by: Jay Halili; John David Hukom
- Music by: Arnold Buena; Allan Feliciano
- Production company: GMA Films
- Distributed by: Regal Films; GMA Films
- Release date: February 14, 2007
- Running time: 113 minutes
- Country: Philippines
- Languages: Filipino; English
- Box office: ₱60−62 million

The Promise (Filipino: Ang Pangako) is a 2007 Filipino coming-of-age romantic drama film directed by Mike Tuviera. The screenplay written by Racquel N. Villavicencio is a remake of Hihintayin Kita sa Langit which she wrote 16 years earlier and was an adaptation of Emily Brontë's 1847 novel Wuthering Heights.

The film stars Richard Gutierrez and Angel Locsin in their last collaboration as romantic leads, with both going on to separate successful careers. Produced by Regal Films and GMA Films, the film was theatrically released on February 14, 2007 (Valentine's Day).

== Plot ==
A man is walking along the beach and tells a story to his grandchildren about a nearby lighthouse. The story is about a girl named Andrea and her older brother Jason whose parents work for the De Vera family. One day, Andrea finds a boy hiding in their truck and her father takes him in.

As they get older, Andrea and the boy, Daniel, grow fond of each other while Jason becomes jealous of the attention Daniel gets. After Jason beats him, Andrea comforts Daniel and the two pretend to get married. Monique, the De Vera's daughter, complains that she wants to have her turn at marrying Daniel. Andrea's parents plan to move into the hacienda behind the De Vera mansion and Jason, disappointed that he will not be living in the big house, runs away.

Years later, Andrea's parents die in a car accident. Jason returns for the funeral and kicks Daniel out of the hacienda. The De Vera children, Antonio and Monique, return from studying abroad and their mother throws them a party. Andrea and Daniel try to get a glimpse of the party even though they are not invited, but Andrea is bitten by a guard dog. Daniel carries her into the party to seek help and Anton summons the doctor. She recovers at the De Vera mansion for a few days. It then seems that Anton has fallen for Andrea and Monique for Daniel but Daniel and Andrea make a promise to always be together. At the lighthouse near the beach, Daniel gives Andrea a locket with their pictures and the two have sex. When Andrea comes home, Jason tells her that he has made a business deal that requires her to marry Anton. When Andrea refuses, Jason threatens to kill her and starts beating her. She cries herself to sleep and hears Daniel calling to her from her window, but ignores him in fear.

The next day Daniel manages to meet with Andrea and questions the wound given to her by Jason the previous night. The couple go to Daniel's house but are interrupted when Jason barges. He shouts at Andrea and pulls her hair and then beats Daniel unconscious. A few days later, Daniel goes to the lake to wash off his wounds. Monique sees him and extends him an invitation to Andrea's birthday party. At the party, Anton gets down on one knee and asks Andrea if she loves him. She sadly looks up at Daniel and says yes. Anton asks her to marry him and before she can answer, Daniel has already fled. Andrea says she will think about it and runs off to find Daniel but cannot find him.

Three years pass - Andrea marries Anton and Daniel, who has become successful, decides to return to his hometown. Anton, Andrea and Monique wait for a friend and business partner of Anton's who is arriving on a yacht - the man turns out to be Daniel. Daniel tries to win Monique's heart again in an attempt to make Andrea jealous. Andrea is still so shocked by Daniel's presence that she faints. That night Daniel comes to speak to her and it is revealed that their feelings for each other have not changed. Daniel tells her to meet him later at the lighthouse and Andrea goes back into the house to look for the locket. When she is sure that Anton has fallen asleep, she goes to the lighthouse to meet with Daniel and the two have sex.

When Andrea comes home from the lighthouse, Anton has knows where she has been. He throws the locket, which she forgot to wear, to the ground. As he grabs Andrea, Monique walks in and asks what is going on. Anton says that Andrea is pretending to love him when she really loves someone else. Monique notices Andrea's locket on the floor and looks at the pictures; it has now become clear to her as to what this was all about. Monique goes to the lighthouse to meet Daniel instead and deceives him, telling him that Andrea does not love him any more. She gives Daniel back the locket.

The next night Andrea, Anton, Monique and Daniel have dinner together. Daniel declares that the yacht that he arrived in now belongs to Monique and proposes to her with a necklace. Surprised, Monique accepts and Andrea is crushed. Daniel and Anton make a deal: Anton will let Daniel marry his sister only if they will move somewhere far away. Meanwhile, Andrea tells Monique not to marry Daniel as he only wants to marry her to make Andrea jealous. Monique does not believe her and leaves. In the middle of the night, Andrea wakes up in pain and clutches her stomach. The next morning she is still asleep, and Anton feels her forehead and calls the doctor.

The doctor concludes that Andrea has a fever but he cannot give Andrea antibiotics because it could harm the baby. Anton does not know anything about a baby and the doctor states that Andrea has an ectopic pregnancy - if not treated soon she could have severe internal bleeding. As Anton is infertile, the only explanation for her pregnancy is Daniel. As soon as the doctor leaves, Anton locks Andrea and himself in the bedroom and he starts to beat her. The maid and Monique overhear from the outside of the door and when they hear that Daniel got Andrea pregnant, Monique cries. She then runs to Daniel's house and tells him what she has just found out. Anton keeps on hitting Andrea and she falls to the ground, with blood on her white dress. Anton stops just as Daniel kicks down the door and runs to Andrea's side. Daniel carries her out of the house and to the beach, where they profess their love for each other and promise that they will live in each other's memories. After the promise is made, Andrea dies.

The movie returns to grandfather from the beginning. His grandchildren ask if Andrea is still alive and he answers that she is in his heart.

== Cast ==
Main cast

- Richard Gutierrez as Daniel
- Angel Locsin as Andrea

Supporting cast

- Rhian Ramos as Monique
- TJ Trinidad as Anton
- Ryan Eigenmann as Jason
- Eugene Domingo as Yaya Delia
- Melissa Mendez as Andrea's mother
- Joel Torre as Gustin (Andrea's & Jason's father)
- Raquel Villavicencio as Anton's mother
- Ella Cruz as Young Andrea
- Jodell Stasic as Young Daniel
- Phytos Ramirez (credited as Phytos Kryiacou) as Young Jason

== Awards ==
Year	Award-Giving Body	Category	Recipient	Result
2008	GMMSF Box-Office Entertainment Awards	Prince of Philippine Movies	Richard Gutierrez	Won
2008	GMMSF Box-Office Entertainment Awards	Princess of Philippine Movies	Angel Locsin	Won

== See also ==
- Wuthering Heights
- List of Wuthering Heights adaptations
- Hihintayin Kita sa Langit
- Walang Hanggan (2012 TV series)
