= Angel Locsin =

Filipino actress (born 1985)

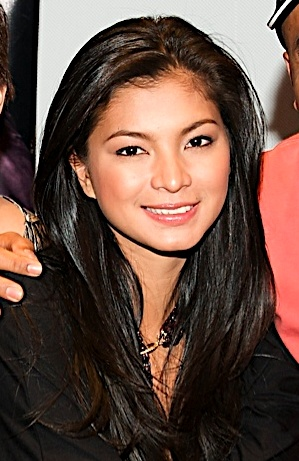
- Locsin in 2008
- Born: Angelica Locsin Colmenares; April 23, 1985 (age 41); Santa Maria, Bulacan, Philippines
- Occupations: Actress; humanitarian
- Years active: 1999–2020
- Works: Full list
- Spouse: Neil Arce (m. 2021)
- Awards: Full list

Angelica Locsin Colmenares (born April 23, 1985) is a Filipino former actress, humanitarian, and advocate. She is known for her dramatic roles and portrayals of heroines and mythological characters in film and television. She is a recipient of various accolades, including five Star Awards, three FAMAS Awards, six Box Office Entertainment Awards, and a Luna Award.

Born in Santa Maria, Bulacan, Locsin attended the University of Santo Tomas Junior High School. She began her acting career in the early 2000s by appearing in supporting roles on screen. She had her breakthrough as the avian-human hybrid protagonist in the fantasy series Mulawin (2004), before starring as the titular superhero in the Ravelo Komiks Universe series Darna (2005) to critical acclaim. For her role as a fledgling lycanthrope in the supernatural drama series Lobo (2008), Locsin earned an International Emmy Award nomination for Best Actress. She appeared in well-received romantic dramas, such as Love Me Again (2009), In the Name of Love (2011), and Unofficially Yours (2012), the last of which is Locsin's highest-grossing release to date. The family drama One More Try (2012), in which she played a single mother caring for her sick son, garnered her Best Actress wins at the Box Office Entertainment, FAMAS, Luna, and Star Awards. She received a Star Award for Best Drama Actress for her portrayal of an indoctrinated military nurse in the spy-action thriller series The General's Daughter (2019). She announced her retirement on an Instagram post in April 2026 having her final work in 2020.

Known for her humanitarian efforts, Locsin has been named one of Asia's Heroes of Philanthropy by Forbes and Asia's Leaders of Tomorrow by Tatler. She promotes various causes, including disaster relief, education, and women's rights. Locsin was noted for her field missions to settlement camps of internally displaced persons during the 2017 armed conflicts in Mindanao. A public figure, she was cited as the world's sexiest woman by FHM Philippines in 2005 and 2010.

== Early life and background ==
Angelica Locsin Colmenares was born on April 23, 1985, in Santa Maria, Bulacan, to Angelo and Emma Colmenares. Locsin's father was a swimmer who earned a bronze medal when the Philippine team won the 4×200-meter freestyle relay during the 1954 Asian Games in Manila. She has two younger siblings: Ella and Angelo. Locsin is reluctant to publicly discuss her family background; she was estranged from her mother until 2007, and has ties to a noble family in Marawi, Lanao del Sur, through her maternal relatives. Locsin and her siblings were raised by their father, who was later diagnosed with complete blindness. Locsin has said she regrets not being able to financially provide for her father's treatment at the onset of his condition. She shares a close bond with her father and credits him as "instrumental" to her achievements.

Locsin was educated at the University of Santo Tomas High School, where she was a member of the varsity swimming team. During this period, she was spotted running errands at SM City North EDSA by a talent scout, who arranged for her to audition for television commercials. After high school, she pursued acting and attended workshops under ABS-CBN's talent management arm Star Magic. She then unsuccessfully auditioned for a role in the teen series G-mik (1999).

== Career ==
=== 2000–2007: Early roles and breakthrough ===
Locsin made her film debut as the young Robina Gokongwei in the 2000 biographical drama Ping Lacson: Super Cop. She then signed a management deal with GMA Network and received her first television part as a series regular in the second season of the teen show Click. She remained with the series from 2002 to 2004. Locsin followed this with guest roles in several television shows, including Ang Iibigin ay Ikaw (2002), Twin Hearts (2003), and Love to Love (2003). She appeared in the second and third installments of the Mano Po film franchise, Mano Po 2: My Home (2002) and Mano Po 3: My Love (2003).

Locsin's breakthrough role came as the avian-human hybrid protagonist in the fantasy action series Mulawin (2004). GMA Network executive Redgie Magno initially approached Maxene Magalona for the part, but offered Locsin the role at Magalona's suggestion. Dominic Zapata, the show's director, intended the concept of mythology to be a "break from Tagalized soaps", but also kept its "novelty" focused on the lead characters. The following year, Locsin starred as the titular superhero in the Ravelo Komiks Universe (Note: Ravelo Komiks Universe is a Filipino media franchise and shared universe centered on a series of superhero films and television shows based on characters that appear in Philippine comic books published by Mars Ravelo.) series Darna (2005), based on Mars Ravelo's comics superheroine of the same name. Locsin was initially hesitant about the part because it required her to drop out of Mulawin, and she felt the series would end prematurely if she left. Locsin agreed to the project after network executives convinced her to take the part. She trained in karate, wushu, and street fighting to prepare. The series garnered positive reviews, with praise for Locsin's portrayal; Nestor Torre Jr. of the Philippine Daily Inquirer described the production as modern and trailblazing, and commended Locsin's "strong presence". Similarly, Pepe Diokno, also from the Philippine Daily Inquirer, wrote that "the [show's] success can be attributed to [Locsin], as she attracts every block and wing of Pinoy society." During its premiere, Darna received the highest Nielsen ratings for a Filipino television series pilot episode with a reported 47.1 percent viewership. Later that year, Locsin reprised the role of Alwina in Mulawin's film adaptation.

In 2006, Locsin starred as a sorceress in the fantasy series Majika alongside Dennis Trillo. In preparation for the part, she trained extensively in horseback riding with co-star and equestrienne Mikee Cojuangco-Jaworski. The show was a critical disappointment; Torre labeled it "less than magical": "Unfortunately, the show is so visuals-driven that the gifted actors don't really have much opportunity to show what they can do." Locsin was in three releases with Richard Gutierrez from 2006 to 2007. In the first, she starred in Mac Alejandre's romantic comedy I Will Always Love You as the love interest of Gutierrez's character. She then appeared in the fifth installment of the Mano Po film series, Mano Po 5: Gua Ai Di (2006). In the coming-of-age drama The Promise (2007), loosely based on Emily Brontë's 1847 novel Wuthering Heights, Locsin portrayed a woman who falls in love with her adoptive brother. The film and her performance received negative reviews from critics; the Philippine Daily Inquirer thought Locsin's transition to adult roles was rushed, "inadequate" and "embarrassing", while critic Elyas Salanga found the film's narrative "typical" and "cliché". Next, she was cast opposite Robin Padilla in the action adventure series Asian Treasures (2007). She then played a facially disfigured victim of abuse in an episode of the anthology series Maalaala Mo Kaya. Locsin's performance earned her a Star Award for Best Single Performance by an Actress.

=== 2008–2012: Established actress ===
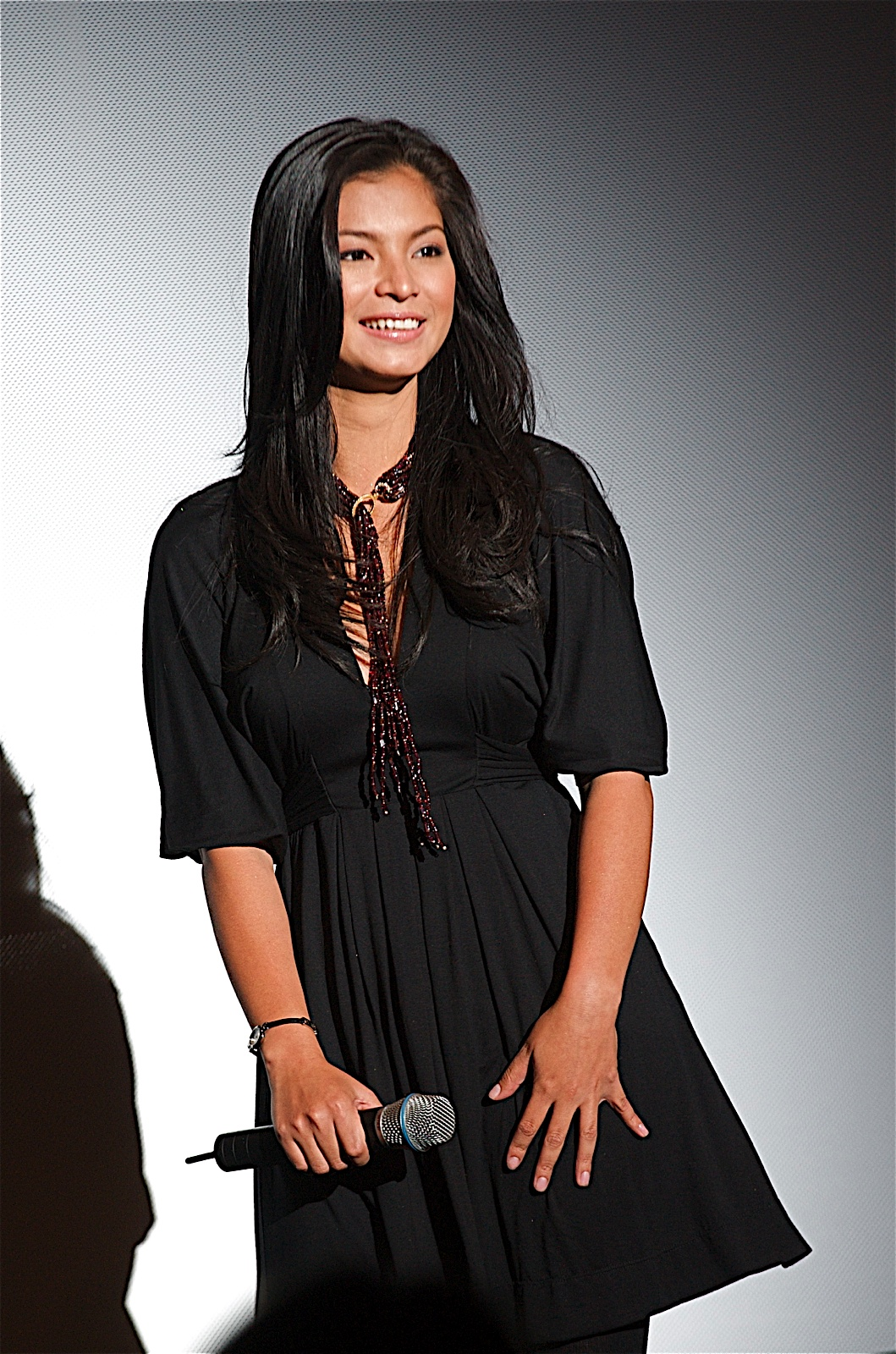
Locsin at a screening of Love Me Again in 2008

Locsin rejected the title role in the television remake of Marimar after signing on to ABS-CBN's 2008 supernatural drama series Lobo. She portrayed Lyka Raymundo, a fledgling lycanthrope caught up in a war between factions of werewolves. She found the project challenging but felt the experience improved her acting methods. She received an International Emmy Award nomination for Best Actress for the series. Set in Bukidnon and Darwin, Northern Territory, the Rory Quintos-directed romantic drama Love Me Again (2009) featured Locsin and Piolo Pascual as ranchers going through financial struggles. Locsin, who is the sole breadwinner of her family, believed certain aspects of her character's life mirrored her own. Film critic Karen Caliwara called Locsin's performance an improvement from her previous releases and found "maturity in her portrayal". In April 2009, she reunited with Quintos for the comedy series remake Only You, based on the eponymous original Korean show.

Locsin portrayed the role of Lia Ortega, the daughter of her lycan character in the second installment of the Lobo series, Imortal (2010). In a review of the show, Bayani San Diego of the Philippine Daily Inquirer drew similarities between Imortal's vampire and werewolf fiction and that of The Twilight Saga, he added that "creatures of the dark are all the rage today, given the popularity of True Blood and The Vampire Diaries." Journalist Earl Villanueva, however, commended Locsin's character and storyline for its "easy transition into a logical sequel", and said the series "seems to be on the right track". Locsin's only film appearance in 2011 was in the star-crossed romantic drama In the Name of Love with director Olivia Lamasan, whose collaboration she found gratifying: "I've learned a lot, especially as to how film acting should be done ... How you use your eyes, your position, and how you maximize camera angles ... I didn't know those things before." To prepare for the role of a courtesan, she learned different styles of ballroom dances and trained in pole dance for three months. Critic Julia Allende praised her portrayal, and pairing with Aga Muhlach, describing it as "the most daring she [Locsin] has ever played" and deemed it a "beautifully nuanced performance". Locsin won the Star Award for Best Actress and the Box Office Entertainment Award for Film Actress of the Year for her role. Later that year, Locsin co-starred with Vhong Navarro in the sitcom Toda Max.

The romantic comedy Unofficially Yours, directed by Cathy Garcia-Molina, was Locsin's first film release of 2012. Co-starring John Lloyd Cruz, it featured her as a sexually promiscuous journalist afraid of commitment. Although the response to the film was mixed, critics were highly appreciative of Locsin's and Cruz's performances; Bibsy Carballo of The Philippine Star highlighted that "their characterizations are sharp, their dialogue smart and modern", but dismissed the film's plot as unoriginal. Writing for the Philippine Daily Inquirer, Torre found the leads' portrayals to be "earnest" and "committed". The film became Locsin's biggest commercial success to date, earning ₱194 million (US$4.59 million) at the box office. The 2012 Metro Manila Film Festival saw the release of One More Try, a family drama about a single mother, played by Locsin, forced to reconnect with her estranged husband to be their son's stem cell donor. Her performance was well received by critics; film reviewer Mark Ching called it "praise-worthy" and "formidable", while Torre believed her portrayal showed "no such inhibiting problem". Locsin was awarded the Box Office Entertainment, FAMAS, Luna, and Star Award for Best Actress for the role.

=== 2013–2026: Comedies, reality television, and retirement ===
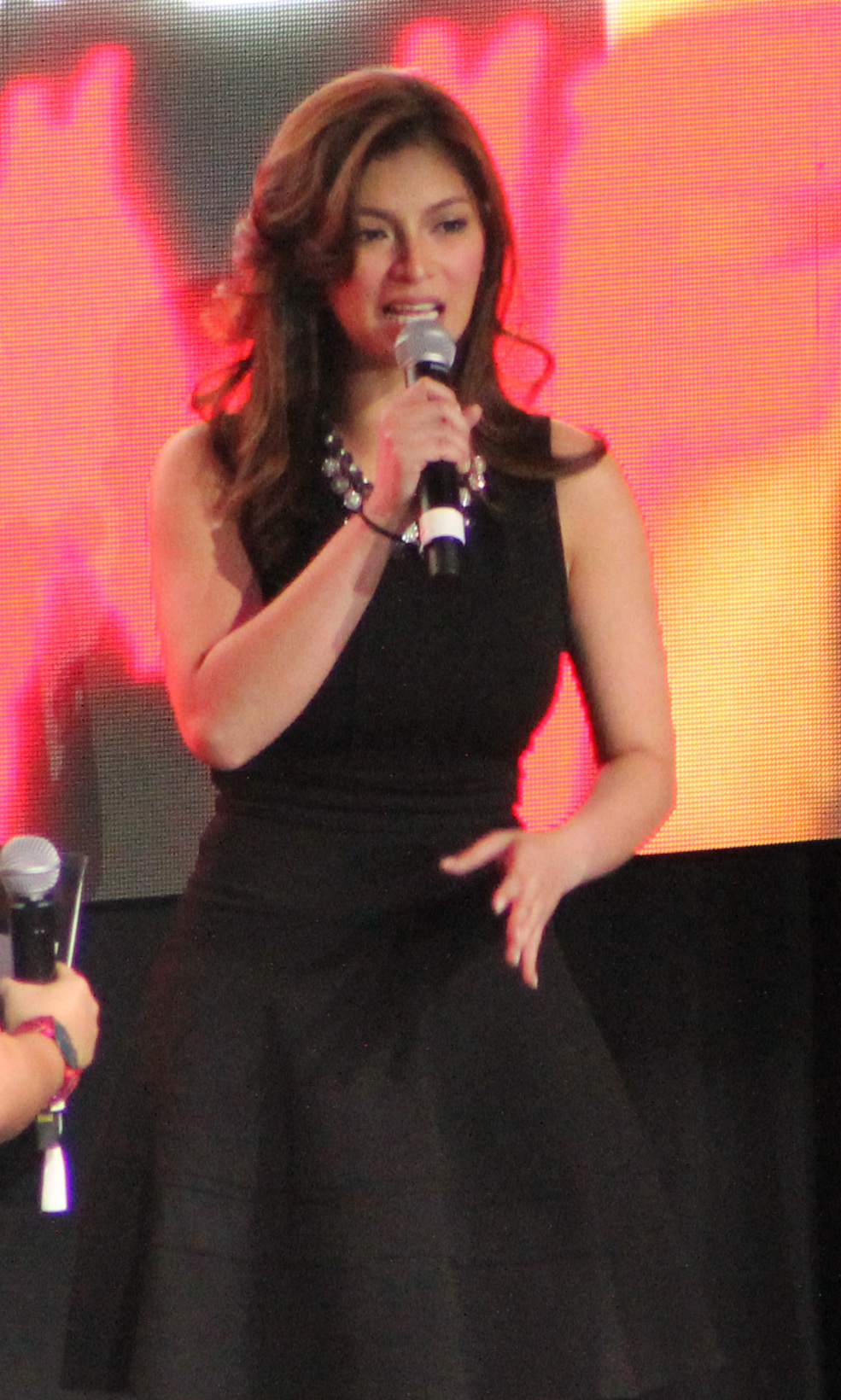
Locsin at a press tour for The Legal Wife in 2014

In 2013, Locsin featured in the ensemble comedy drama Four Sisters and a Wedding. She starred alongside Bea Alonzo, Shaina Magdayao, and Toni Gonzaga, as siblings with deliberate plans to prevent their brother from getting married. Rito Asilo of the Philippine Daily Inquirer was particularly impressed with her performance, writing, "[Locsin] also does well in a focused portrayal that is devoid of ego and vanity, you can sense her stepping back when the spotlight is on her co-actresses." Rappler's Carljoe Javier opined that Locsin and Alonzo "lent an emotional gravity to the film". Four Sisters and a Wedding was a commercial success, grossing ₱175 million (US$4.12 million) at the box office. For the film, Locsin received FAMAS and Star Award nominations for Best Actress. She returned to television playing the lead role in the drama series The Legal Wife (2014). The Philippine Daily Inquirer was critical of the show's "mundane" and "predictable" theme, and Torre found Locsin's acting to be intolerable and "too livid".

After a one-year absence on screen, Locsin appeared in three productions in 2016. Her first release was Joyce Bernal's Everything About Her, a comedy drama co-starring Vilma Santos. Stephanie Mayo of the Daily Tribune termed Locsin's and Santos's portrayals as "effortless, natural, and searing"; The Philippine Star lauded the cast's acting as "compelling" and called the film a "finely-crafted family drama". At the Asia-Pacific Film Festival, Locsin won Best Supporting Actress for her performance in the film. She then served as a judge on the fifth season of the reality talent competition show Pilipinas Got Talent, based on the original British show franchise. Her final appearance that year was in The Third Party, a comedy that depicts the complex relationship in a throuple. Asilo dismissed the film as "more derivative than inventive" and stated that Locsin is "weighed down by her pushed, staccato delivery, and relies too much on knee-jerk realizations". Philbert Dy of ClickTheCity.com wrote, "[The film] seems to make its characters cry in lieu of telling their stories, or letting them hash out the complexity of what they're feeling."

The final installment of the Lobo series, La Luna Sangre, was Locsin's only screen appearance in 2017. She reprised the part of Lia Ortega from Imortal in the premiere episode, and later returned in a guest role as a vigilante vampire named Jacintha Magsaysay. In January 2018, she returned as a judge for the sixth season of Pilipinas Got Talent. Locsin began 2019 by starring in the spy-action thriller series The General's Daughter, in which she played an indoctrinated military nurse. She volunteered at the Armed Forces of the Philippines General Hospital before filming began, and in preparation, trained in Krav Maga, Muay Thai, and knife fighting. Locsin said of her approach to portraying roles outside mythology genres, "I try to humanize my character. Rhian is not a superhero. She has no powers. She has struggles, she has mistakes, she falls down, she fails, but she doesn't give up." Mozart Pastrano of the Philippine Daily Inquirer wrote of Locsin's performance, "She brought moral gravitas to her role, displaying her luminous looks, as well as uncommon physical stamina and skills." She received a Star Award and a Box Office Entertainment Award for Best Actress. In June 2020, Locsin hosted the public service show Iba Yan.

On December 21, 2025, Locsin briefly appeared on Pinoy Big Brother: Celebrity Collab Edition 2.0 with her back turned from the camera and only her voice was heard.

On April 2026, Locsin announced her retirement in an Instagram post, after news broke out that Federico "Piki" Lopez proposed to shut down ABS-CBN for good due to financial struggles but other members of Lopez opposed the idea. Locsin stated that she may be "retired and no longer an employee" but reaffirmed her loyalty and gratitude for ABS-CBN.

== Philanthropy and activism ==
"These are urgent times when we have to act as fast as we can to save lives and rebuild communities, and we don't even have to think why."

— Locsin on her motives for providing humanitarian aid in Marawi

Locsin is identified as one of the most involved Filipino celebrities in humanitarian work and civic engagement. She is an active volunteer and an ambassador of the Philippine Red Cross. In the aftermath of typhoons Ketsana (Ondoy) and Parma (Pepeng) in 2009, she joined actress Anne Curtis and organized a fundraising initiative called "Shop & Share" which raised ₱1 million in emergency assistance for the non-profit organization. She also provided ₱600,000 towards ABS-CBN Foundation's Sagip Kapamilya Fund. In 2013, Locsin auctioned her 1970 Chevrolet Chevelle and donated the proceeds to relief efforts for Typhoon Haiyan (Yolanda). After the 2019 Cotabato earthquakes, she facilitated relief operations and contributed ₱1 million in financial aid. Two years later, Locsin pledged to donate ₱2 million to the Office of the Vice President of the Philippines to help the victims of Typhoon Rai (Odette). During the COVID-19 pandemic, Locsin and Curtis curated an auction which raised ₱6 million in support of efforts to administer COVID-19 vaccines in the Philippines.

Locsin has advocated for children's education. She has funded scholarships and personally contributed over US$300,000 to the cause. A vocal supporter of women's rights and gender equality, she has spoken about the stigma women face, "We're still in that stage. It is upsetting that, for me, we still lack efforts to prevent that [stigma] especially in our workplace, to have a comfortable and safe place for women." She also actively supports LGBT rights and describes herself as a "proud ally". In June 2015, she voiced her approval of same-sex marriage, stating, "We should show respect, sensitivity, & compassion to one another ... I'm not going to deny my LGBT friends the protection that straight people get ... think of insurances, healthcare". Locsin has participated in a campaign against domestic violence. In 2020, she partnered with the United States Agency for International Development (USAID) and Lunas Collective, a hotline for survivors and victims of domestic abuse, to raise awareness and promote international cooperation.

Locsin first witnessed the plight of the indigenous Lumads during a visit in Marawi, Lanao del Sur, to reconnect with her maternal relatives in 2009, an experience she later credited with having brought her a greater understanding of the situation. In 2015, she voiced her opposition and outrage amidst the violence and extrajudicial killings of the Lumads at the hands of paramilitary forces. During the 2017 siege in Marawi, an estimated 200,000 residents were forced to leave their homes, including 2,500 Lumads. In the following weeks, Locsin travelled to Mindanao and met with internally displaced persons at settlement camps in Baloi, Iligan, and Marawi, where she provided food supplies and financial aid.

Locsin has received wide recognition for her humanitarian work. In December 2019, Forbes magazine named her one of Asia's Heroes of Philanthropy for a decade of contributions to various philanthropic causes, and she was appointed an Ambassador for Peace and a Humanitarian Advocate by the Gawad Filipino Awards. She was recognized by Tatler magazine as one of Asia's Leaders of Tomorrow in the publication's annual Gen T list in October 2020. The following year, Locsin received the inaugural Spirit of Philanthropy Award from the Philippine Red Cross.

== Reception and public image ==
Locsin is often regarded by critics as one of the "most sought after leading ladies" on film and television in the Philippines, and has been cited as one of the "greatest movie actresses" in the last decade by Yes! magazine. She has appeared in a range of film genres, but generally played roles in mainstream productions. Media critic James Anarcon praised her for being the rare actress who "allowed herself to be deglamorized". Metro magazine noted that as a young actress on the teen series Click, Locsin plays the "boyish but charming girl-next-door, which is not unlike the star's real down-to-earth persona". Locsin has said she bases her acting approach on her observations of people around her: "I guess part of being an actor is learning how to be sensitive to the needs of people ... I always do research before taking on a role. As a result, I become more aware of what people outside my line of work are going through."

Early in her career, Locsin specialized in portraying heroines and mythological characters in fantasy and supernatural genres. Nathalie Tomada of The Philippine Star wrote, "No other actress but [Locsin], who first shot to fame through fantaseryes, can claim a record of strong and kickass female roles as extensive as hers." An interest in portraying an "action figure that departs from the sexy stereotype" has led Locsin to these roles. Locsin asserted, "You should not be limited to certain things". Meanwhile, writer Rommel Llanes dispelled the perception that portraying superheroes could hurt an actor's career, stating that Locsin is one of those exceptions. Her Darna co-star Celia Rodriguez called her "the best ... bar none", saying, "She is perfect for the role. She had the figure for it. She was fearless. She refused to have a double even when portions of her body were badly hurt by the harness." Similarly, The Philippine Star considered Locsin as the "most fitting actress to have slipped on the iconic red suit and crest". Cathy Garcia-Molina, who directed Locsin in La Luna Sangre, and Robin Padilla, her co-star in Asian Treasures, commended her for doing her own stunts.

The media has described Locsin as the "real-life Darna" and an "angel in disguise" for her volunteerism and charitable work. Writing for Mega magazine, Rose Estellas lauded her for having the "heart to serve others" and for using her "influence and platform to continuously help and change the lives of Filipinos". Commenting on her off-screen persona, journalist Gerry Plaza wrote that she is "simple, unfiltered, unassuming". Locsin said, "I have no hero complex. I just believe that when there's a will there's a way. I will continue to help in different ways. Helping doesn't always have to involve giving away money."

According to the Philippine Red Cross, Angel Locsin had participated in relief distributions since Typhoon Ondoy in 2009. In 2019, she and her fiancé, Neil Arce, personally donated and volunteered in distributing relief goods and hygiene kits to families affected by earthquakes in Davao del Sur."

In 2020, Locsin hosted Iba 'Yan, a public-service program that featured inspiring stories of Filipinos, including people whose efforts to help others did not always receive public recognition.

Since her portrayal of the superhero Darna, Locsin has been cited as a sex symbol by many sources, including FHM Philippines who named her the world's sexiest woman in 2005 and 2010. She has been included in Yes! magazine's annual beauty list in 2009, 2014, 2016, and 2018. In December 2011, Locsin received a star on the Philippines Walk of Fame.

== Personal life ==
Locsin was in a relationship with actor Miko Sotto for six months until he died from a falling accident at his high-rise apartment building in Mandaluyong in December 2003. Locsin said of his death: "I had to let go no matter how hard and painful it was ... I have to go on living". From 2005 to 2016, Locsin was romantically involved with high-profile personalities, including Miko Sotto's cousin Oyo Boy Sotto, her Majika co-star Dennis Trillo, footballer Phil Younghusband, and actor Luis Manzano. In September 2017, Locsin began dating professional poker player and film producer Neil Arce. They became engaged in June 2019 and married two years later in a civil ceremony on July 26, 2021.

At the end of March 2022, Locsin opened up that she and husband were not planning on having a child yet as she was still treating a health problem with her thyroid.

== Acting credits and awards ==
According to the box-office site Box Office Mojo, Locsin's most commercially successful films include Love Me Again, In the Name of Love, Unofficially Yours, Four Sisters and a Wedding, and Everything About Her.

Locsin has been named Best Supporting Actress at the Asia-Pacific Film Festival for Everything About Her. For her role in One More Try, she was awarded the Box Office Entertainment, FAMAS, Luna and Star Award for Best Actress. She received a Box Office Entertainment and Star Award for In the Name of Love. In addition, for her role in the television series The General's Daughter, she received a Star Award for Best Actress, and won TV Actress of the Year and Best Acting Ensemble in a Drama Series at the Box Office Entertainment Awards.

Locsin went into hiatus since 2021 until she announced her retirement on April 2026.
