= Everything About Her =

2016 Filipino comedy drama film

- Theatrical movie poster
- Directed by: Joyce E. Bernal
- Screenplay by: Irene Emma Villamor
- Story by: Mia A. Concio
- Produced by: Elma S. Medua
- Starring: Vilma Santos-Recto; Angel Locsin; Xian Lim
- Cinematography: Shayne Sarte
- Edited by: Marya Ignacio; Joyce E. Bernal
- Music by: Carmina Robles-Cuya
- Production company: ABS-CBN Film Productions, Inc.
- Distributed by: Star Cinema
- Release date: January 27, 2016 (Philippines)
- Running time: 126 minutes
- Country: Philippines
- Language: Filipino
- Budget: N/A
- Box office: ₱151 million (Philippines) ₱208 million (Worldwide)

Everything About Her is a 2016 Filipino comedy-drama film directed by Joyce E. Bernal, starring Vilma Santos, Xian Lim and Ms. Angel Locsin. It was released on January 27, 2016, under Star Cinema. The film earned ₱15 million on its first day of release.

As of February 20, 2016, the film has earned ₱200 million The film received generally positive reviews from film critics.

== Plot ==
Successful businesswoman Vivian learns that she is suffering from stage 3 cancer. She hires a private nurse, Jaica, to take care of her. Despite her patient's grumpiness, Jaica begins to play a bigger role in Vivian's life as she becomes the bridge between Vivian and her estranged son Albert, who resents his mother for neglecting her and develops feelings for Jaica. Vivian orders Jaica not to reveal her condition through a non-disclosure agreement, but after a severe medical emergency, Albert unintentionally revealed that he knew the truth from Jaica. Initially angry for her betrayal, Vivian forgives Jaica and bonds with her and her family, whom she helps. She eventually reconciles with Albert and after being completely cured, gives her blessing to their relationship.

== Cast ==
- Vilma Santos as Vivian Rabaya
- Angel Locsin as Jaica Domingo
- Xian Lim as Albert Mitra
- Michael De Mesa as Leo
- Nonie Buencamino as JJ
- Khalil Ramos as Jared
- Devon Seron as Jenny
- Alexa Ilacad as Jewel
- Nor Domingo as Paul
- Maria Lopez as Maria
- Marielle Sorino as Marielle
- Dan Samson as Dan
- Vangie Labalan as Ellen
- Buboy Villar as Boy
- Niña Dolino as Arlene
- Dante Ponce as Mike
- Bart Guingona as Dr. Raymond

== Release ==
Everything About Her opened in the Philippines on January 27, 2016, under Star Cinema. The film open in the United States on January 29 and the United Kingdom on February 6.

=== Rating ===
The film is graded A by the Cinema Evaluation Board (CEB) and is rated PG (Parental Guidance) by the Movie and Television Review and Classification Board (MTRCB).

== Reception ==
=== Critical reception ===
Everything About Her received generally positive reviews from film critics, praising the three main actors' performances.

Oggs Cruz from Rappler gave a positive review saying "Everything About Her is predictable, which isn't necessary a problem. There is also something inherently wrong about the message of women being forced to choose between motherhood and their careers, but that message is but part and parcel of the studio's family-friendly and escapist agendas."

Rod Magaru Show, a blogger gave a rating of 9/10 saying that "The film's attempt to bring out the tears in audience eyes succeeded in multiple scenes. If you have to ask me, I will never ever let my mom feel like I am near yet so far. But of course we live in different background. From professional writers' perspective, there's a story behind everything. How a picture got on a wall. How a scar got on your face."

== Accolades ==
=== International ===
Year	Award-giving body	Host city/ country	Recipient(s)	Award	Result
2017	57th Asia – Pacific Film Festival	Phnom Penh, Cambodia	Angel Locsin	Best Supporting Actress	Won

=== Local ===
Year	Award-giving body	Recipient(s)	Award	Result
2017	15th Gawad Tanglaw	Xian Lim	Best Supporting Actor	Won
2017	1st GEMS (Guild of Educators, Mentors and Students) Awards	Xian Lim	Best Supporting Actor	Won
2017	1st GEMS (Guild of Educators, Mentors and Students) Awards	Everything About Her	Best Film (Mainstream)	Won
2017	1st GEMS (Guild of Educators, Mentors and Students) Awards	Bb. Joyce Bernal	Best Director (Mainstream)	Won
2017	1st GEMS (Guild of Educators, Mentors and Students) Awards	Vilma Santos	Best Actress	Won
2017	Guillermo Mendoza Memorial Scholarship Foundation; Box Office Entertainment Awards	Vilma Santos	Film Best Actress of the Year	Won
2017	19th Gawad Pasado	Vilma Santos	Pinakapasadong Aktres	Won
2017	19th Gawad Pasado	Angel Locsin	Pinakapasadong Aktres	Nominated
2017	The 1st EDDYS (Entertainment Editors' Award)	Angel Locsin	Best Supporting Actress	Won
2017	The 1st EDDYS (Entertainment Editors' Award)	Vilma Santos	Best Actress	Won
2017	The 1st EDDYS (Entertainment Editors' Award)	Xian Lim	Best Supporting Actor	Nominated
2017	The 1st EDDYS (Entertainment Editors' Award)	Emerson Tecson	Best Musical Score	Won
2017	The 1st EDDYS (Entertainment Editors' Award)	Irene Villamor and Mia Concio	Best Screenplay	Won
2017	The 1st EDDYS (Entertainment Editors' Award)	Shayne Sarte	Best Cinematography	Nominated
2017	The 1st EDDYS (Entertainment Editors' Award)	Joey Luna	Best Production Design	Nominated
2017	The 1st EDDYS (Entertainment Editors' Award)	Marya Ignacio and Joyce Bernal	Best Editing	Nominated
2017	The 1st EDDYS (Entertainment Editors' Award)	Everything About Her	Best Film	Nominated
2017	The 1st EDDYS (Entertainment Editors' Award)	Bb. Joyce Bernal	Best Director	Nominated
2017	33rd Philippine Movie Press Club (PMPC); Star Awards for Movies 2017	Bb. Joyce Bernal	Movie Director of the Year	Nominated
2017	33rd Philippine Movie Press Club (PMPC); Star Awards for Movies 2017	Everything About Her	Movie of the Year	Nominated
2017	33rd Philippine Movie Press Club (PMPC); Star Awards for Movies 2017	Vilma Santos	Movie Actress of the Year	Won
2017	33rd Philippine Movie Press Club (PMPC); Star Awards for Movies 2017	Angel Locsin	Movie Actress of the Year	Nominated
2017	33rd Philippine Movie Press Club (PMPC); Star Awards for Movies 2017	Xian Lim	Movie Supporting Actor of the Year	Won
2017	33rd Philippine Movie Press Club (PMPC); Star Awards for Movies 2017	Irene Emma Villamor	Movie Screen Writer of the Year	Nominated
2017	33rd Philippine Movie Press Club (PMPC); Star Awards for Movies 2017	Shayne Sarte	Movie Cinematographer of the Year	Nominated
2017	33rd Philippine Movie Press Club (PMPC); Star Awards for Movies 2017	Joey Luna	Movie Production Designer of the Year	Nominated
2017	33rd Philippine Movie Press Club (PMPC); Star Awards for Movies 2017	Marya Ignacio	Movie Editor of the Year	Nominated
2017	33rd Philippine Movie Press Club (PMPC); Star Awards for Movies 2017	Carmina Cuya	Movie Musical Scorer of the Year	Won
2017	33rd Philippine Movie Press Club (PMPC); Star Awards for Movies 2017	Aurel Claro Bilbao	Movie Sound Engineer of the Year	Nominated
2017	The PEP List Year 4	Vilma Santos	Movie Actress of the Year	Won
2017	7th Edukcircle Awards 2017	Vilma Santos	Most Influential Film Actress of the Year	Won
2017	7th Edukcircle Awards 2017	Angel Locsin	Most Influential Film Actress of the Year	Nominated
2018	Film Development Council of the Philippines	Angel Locsin	Special Citation	Won
2018	National Commission for Culture and the Arts	Angel Locsin	Ani ng Dangal Awardee	Won
