= Asian Treasures =

2007 Philippine television drama series

- Title card
- Genre: Action drama; Adventure
- Developed by: Don Michael Perez
- Written by: Don Michael Perez; Des Garbes-Severino; Abi Lam Parayno; Anna Aleta-Nadela
- Directed by: Eric Quizon
- Starring: Robin Padilla; Angel Locsin
- Theme music composer: Tata Betita
- Opening theme: "Walang Yamang (Mas Hihigit Sa'Yo)" by Cueshé
- Country of origin: Philippines
- Original language: Tagalog
- No. of episodes: 118

Production
- Executive producers: Angie Castrence; Edlyn Tallada-Abuel
- Production locations: Philippines; China; Mongolia; Thailand
- Camera setup: Multiple-camera setup
- Running time: 18–50 minutes
- Production company: GMA Entertainment TV

Original release
- Network: GMA Network
- Release: January 15 – June 29, 2007

Asian Treasures is a 2007 Philippine television drama action adventure series broadcast by GMA Network. The series marked as the first Philippine television drama series to be filmed in Mongolia, Thailand and China, and is one of the most expensive television series in the Philippine television costing more than 140 million Philippine pesos. Directed by Eric Quizon, it stars Robin Padilla and Angel Locsin. It premiered on January 15, 2007, on the network's Telebabad line up. The series concluded on June 29, 2007, with a total of 118 episodes.

The series is streaming online on YouTube.

== Cast and characters ==
Cast

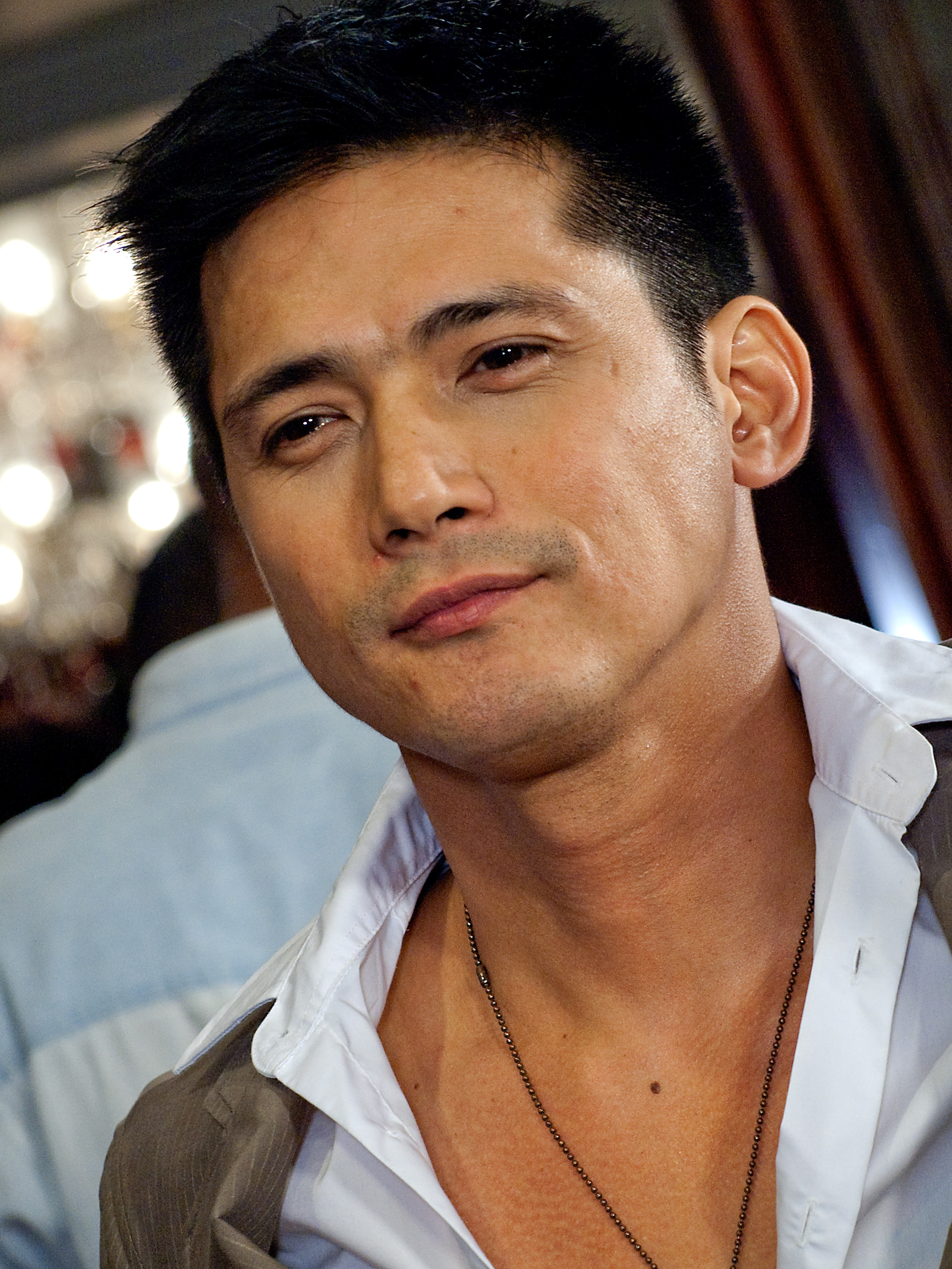
Robin Padilla

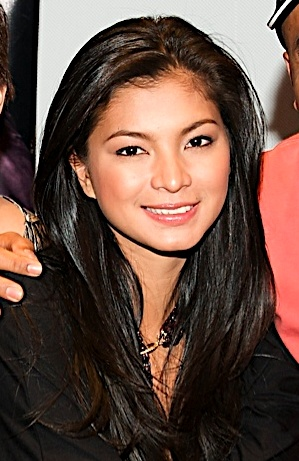
Angel Locsin

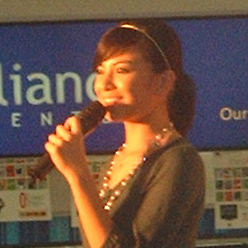
Glaiza de Castro

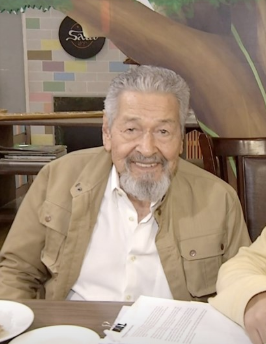
Eddie Garcia

Lead cast

- Robin Padilla as Elias Pinaglabanan / Susi / Diego
- Angel Locsin as Gabriela Agoncillo / Emma / Abigail Mediran

Supporting cast

- Marvin Agustin as Hector Madrigal
- Diana Zubiri as Ingrid Vargas / Urduja
- Eddie Garcia as Wakan U. Matadtu / Supremo / Datu Makatunaw
- Ronaldo Valdez as Ulysses Agoncillo / Plaridel
- Caridad Sanchez as Miranda / Melchora
- Jaime Fabregas as Pio Roman Dalisay / Gomburza
- Joonee Gamboa as Julian Agoncillo / Sulaiman
- Rommel Padilla as Leo
- Gio Alvarez as Cedric Samonte
- Marky Cielo as Mateo Madrigal
- Glaiza de Castro as Clara Pinaglabanan
- Margaret Wilson as Via
- Ella V. as Lady Grace
- Francis Magundayao as Pogi

Recurring cast

- Menggie Cobarrubias as Pablito
- Mon Confiado as X / Xander
- Katarina Perez as Pia
- Megan Young as Anna
- Jerome Calica as Y / Yagon
- Gina Alajar as Elvira
- Paolo Contis as Victor
- Bembol Roco as Marcus Vergara
- Gardo Versoza as Socrates
- Sandy Andolong as Araceli
- July Hidalgo as a terrorist
- Rita Iringan as Charlene
- Ailyn Luna as Venice
- Ken Punzalan as Gilbert
- Rea Nakpil as Z
- Gail Lardizabal as Savanah Vergara
- Berting Labra as Jose

Guest cast

- Sunshine Cruz as Esmeralda
- Cesar Montano as Pancho Pistolero
- Girlie Alcantara
- Tommy Abuel as Swinton
- Paul Salas as younger Hector
- JM Reyes as young Diego
- Ella Guevara as younger Gabriela
- Bianca Pulmano as younger Ingrid
- Andrew De Real
- Ace Espinosa
- Joe Gruta
- Ping Medina as Mateo
- Pocholo Montes as Takeshi
- Boots Plata
- Jen Rosendhal as Marie
- Ti Tiu
- Andrew Schimmer as Zoilo
- Gayle Valencia as Lea

== Production ==
Principal photography concluded in June 2007.

== Ratings ==
According to AGB Nielsen Philippines Mega Manila household ratings, the pilot episode of Asian Treasures earned a 41.8% rating. The final episode garnered a 38.1% rating.

== Accolades ==
Accolades received by Asian Treasures
Year	Award	Category	Recipient	Result	Ref.
2007	21st PMPC Star Awards for Television	Best Actress	Angel Locsin	Nominated	
