= Alfonso Martinez (actor) =

Filipino actor (born 1988)

- Born: Alfonso Sumilang Martinez; May 19, 1987 (age 39); Metro Manila, Philippines
- Other name: Alfons Martinez
- Occupation: Actor
- Years active: 1991–1994; 2007–2010
- Parent(s): Albert Martinez (father); Liezl Martinez (mother)
- Relatives: William Martinez (uncle); Aga Muhlach (uncle)

Alfonso Sumilang Martinez (born May 19, 1988) is a Filipino actor.

== Career ==
Martinez made his television debut, as Alfons Martinez, in ABS-CBN's children's gag-variety show Ang TV. He played a nephew to Aga Muhlach, who is also his real-life maternal uncle, in the sitcom Oki Doki Doc.

A month after Star Magic launched Star Magic Batch 15 — still in celebration of its 15th anniversary in 2007 — ABS-CBN's talent arm launched another batch of new talents. The group, dubbed as "Royalties", consisted of Megan Young, Gian Sotto, Michael Manahan, Michael Manotoc, and Alfonso Martinez.

Martinez, along with Carl Guevarra, joined the cast of Star Magic Presents: Abt Ur Luv, which was revamped to Abt Ur Luv, Ur Lyf 2 in 2007. He played Daniel the romantic interest of Isabelle Abiera's character in Abt Ur Luv Ur Lyf 2—his first TV role in 15 years after his television debut in Ang TV.

When Abt Ur Luv Ur Lyf 2 ended in 2008, he then went to appear in 2 other seasons of Star Magic Presents namely: Astigs in Haay...skul Lyf and Star Magic Presents: Astigs in Luvin' Lyf.

== Personal life ==
Alfonso Martinez is the middle child and only son of actors Albert Martinez and Liezl Martinez. He has an older sister Alyanna and a younger sister Alyssa. He is a paternal nephew of William Martinez and Yayo Aguila and is also a maternal nephew of actors Aga Muhlach and Charlene Gonzales. His maternal grandparents are actors Amalia Fuentes and Romeo Vasquez.

In September 2020, Martinez became engaged to his "non-showbiz" girlfriend, Mikaela. The couple also announced that they were expecting their first child, a son.

Martinez has scoliosis.

== Filmography ==
=== Television ===
Year	Title	Role	Notes	Source
1992–1994	Ang TV	Himself	Credited as "Alfons Martinez"	
1993–1994	Oki Doki Doc	Fonzie	Credited as "Alfons Martinez"	
2007	Star Magic Presents: Abt Ur Luv, Ur Lyf 2	Daniel		
2008	Star Magic Presents: Astigs in Haay...skul Lyf	Gibbs		
2008	Star Magic Presents: Star Magic Presents: Astigs in Luvin' Lyf	Marty		
