= Astigs =

2008 Philippine television teen drama series

- Title card
- Genre: Teen drama Comedy
- Directed by: Erick C. Salud
- Starring: AJ Perez, Enchong Dee, Dino Imperial, Chris Gutierrez, and Angelo Patrimonio
- Country of origin: Philippines
- Original languages: Filipino; English
- No. of episodes: 17

Production
- Running time: 60 minutes

Original release
- Network: ABS-CBN
- Release: January 12 – May 10, 2008

Astigs is a 2008 Philippine television drama series broadcast by ABS-CBN. The series is part of the network's Star Magic Presents anthology. Directed by Erick C. Salud, it stars AJ Perez, Enchong Dee, Dino Imperial, Chris Gutierrez, and Angelo Patrimonio. It premiered on January 12, 2008. The show concluded on May 10, 2008, with a total of 17 episodes.

== Premise ==
The series follows different stories centered on young people and their relationships, friendships, and experiences. Its first story, Astigs in Haay...School Lyf, follows five outsiders who attempt to fit in with their school's social crowd. After being rejected by existing school clubs, they establish their own club, called "Astig", which welcomes students who are considered different.

The second story, Astigs in Luvin' Lyf, centers on Epi after his breakup with Janine. His friends introduce him to Reema, a motorcycle-riding girl, as he attempts to recover from his heartbreak. Epi later confronts Jethro concerning Reema.

== Cast and characters ==
The cast of Astigs

Astigs in Haay...School Lyf

- Dino Imperial as Andoy
- Chris Gutierrez as Sean
- AJ Perez as Tyler
- Enchong Dee as Ipe
- Angelo Patrimonio as Galo
- Isabelle Abiera as Kid
- Empress Schuck as April
- Lauren Young as Josie
- Arno Morales as Bry
- Mara Lopez as Amber
- Alfonso Martinez as Gibbs
- Carlo Guevarra as Ilai
- Martin del Rosario as Drex
- Mikee Lee as Noel
- Fred Payawan as Eric
- Jenny Suico as Elvie
- Nene Tamayo as Geraldine
- Cass Ponti as Ms. Dimagalang
- Bob Dela Cruz as Rico
- Marco Aytona as James
- Jordan Aguilar as Michael
- Franz Pumaren as Pikoy
- Bianca Reyes as Rhea

Astigs in Luvin' Lyf

- Enchong Dee as Epi
- Megan Young as Janine
- AJ Perez as Wave
- Lauren Young as Sandy
- Chris Gutierrez as Clay
- Zia Marquez as Trisha/Trish
- Angelo Patrimonio as Alvin
- Victor Basa as Dean
- Valeen Montenegro as Ella
- Empress Schuck as Reema
- Dino Imperial as Jethro
- Martin del Rosario as Blake
- Isabelle Abiera as Ice
- Jessy Mendiola as Shannon
- Alfonso Martinez as Marty
- Dianne Medina as Teena
