= Chris Gutierrez =

Filipino actor

- Born: Christopher Juno Balbin (Note: Chris Gutierrez was born in the United States. Thus, he does not possess his mother's maiden name which is Gutierrez.); May 9, 1992 (age 34); Delaware, U.S.
- Other name: Christopher Gutierrez
- Occupation: Actor
- Years active: 2006–2013

Chris Gutierrez (born Christopher Juno Balbin on 9 May 1992) is a Filipino actor. He is a member of ABS-CBN's Star Magic Batch 13. He is a grandson of actors Gloria Romero and Juancho Gutierrez.

== Biography ==
=== Family background ===
Christopher Gutierrez is a grandson of veteran Filipino actress Gloria Romero and his grandfather is actor Juancho Gutierrez. He is the only son of Maritess, a professional chef, the only daughter of Gloria and Juancho.

Gutierrez was born in Delaware, United States on May 9, 1992. His parents divorced when he was young, and then moved to the Philippines with his mother, leaving behind his dad in Seattle. They lived together with his grandmother Gloria Romero.

=== Career ===
Until the offer from Star Magic came, Gutierrez never considered entering showbiz. He was only 13 when he was contacted by ABS-CBN's talent management arm. In 2006, he was launched as a member of Star Magic Batch 13 along with 23 other aspiring actors.

The same year, he made guest appearances in the ABS-CBN shows Homeboy, Wowowee and ASAP. He was later cast in the show Star Magic Presents: Abt Ur Luv. He played the role of Rickson, a love interest to Giselle, played by Zia Marquez. This was the start of the Chris-Zia team up. He and Marquez later reprised their respective roles in the follow-up season, Abt Ur Luv Ur Lyf 2.

When Abt Ur Luv ended in 2008, he then starred in the new season of Star Magic Presents: Astigs. The show only went on for two mini-seasons, Astigs in Haay...School Life and Astigs in Luvin' Lyf. In Astigs in Luvin' Lyf, Gutierrez was again paired with Marquez.

== Filmography ==
Television
Year	Title	Role	Notes
2006–2007	Star Magic Presents: Abt Ur Luv	Rickson	
2007–2008	Star Magic Presents: Abt Ur Luv Ur Lyf 2	Rickson	
2008–2011	ASAP '08: "Dynamite Dance Crew"	Himself	
2008	Star Magic Presents: Astigs in Haay...School Life	Sean	
2008	Star Magic Presents: Astigs: Luvin' Life	Clay	
2008	Maalaala Mo Kaya: "Popcorn"	Jay Ar	
2009-2011	ASAP '09	Himself	Host/performer, "Dynamite Dance Crew" segment
2009	Maynila: "Playback Time"	Liam	
2009	Your Song Presents: Boystown	Brent	
2009	Midnight DJ	Mark	Guest, 1 episode
2013	Wish Ko Lang	Himself	"Good Samaritan" episode
