= Your Song Presents: Boystown =

- Created by: ABS-CBN Studios; Rondel P. Lindayag; Regal Films
- Based on: Boystown (1982) by Marilou Diaz-Abaya
- Written by: Noreen Capili; Bing Castro; Mariami Tanangco; Sigfreid Barros Sanchez
- Directed by: Lino Cayetano
- Starring: Enchong Dee; Robi Domingo; Sam Concepcion; AJ Perez; Dino Imperial; Arron Villaflor; Chris Gutierrez
- Theme music composer: Wency Cornejo
- Opening theme: "Next in Line" by Simon Wood
- Country of origin: Philippines
- Original language: Tagalog
- No. of episodes: 7

Production
- Executive producers: Carlo L. Katigbak; Cory V. Vidanes; Laurenti M. Dyogi; Roldeo T. Endrinal
- Producer: Jennifer B. Soliman
- Production location: Philippines
- Running time: 60 minutes
- Production company: Dreamscape Entertainment

Original release
- Network: ABS-CBN
- Release: May 10 – June 21, 2009

Your Song Presents: Boystown is part of the ninth season of Your Song a weekly series every Sunday after ASAP '09 over ABS-CBN and aired from May 10, 2009 to June 21, 2009.

== Plot ==
It is a story that would essentially differentiate teenage boys from real men. Situated at a reform center supposedly for juvenile delinquents and street children, Cottage No.5 houses four rebellious teens who have no sense of purpose up until coach Daniel have encouraged them to join the swimming team led by Arnel. Their lives become more complicated, however, as the latter inevitably meets rich preppy boy Arkin who takes an instant dislike towards him.

== Cast ==
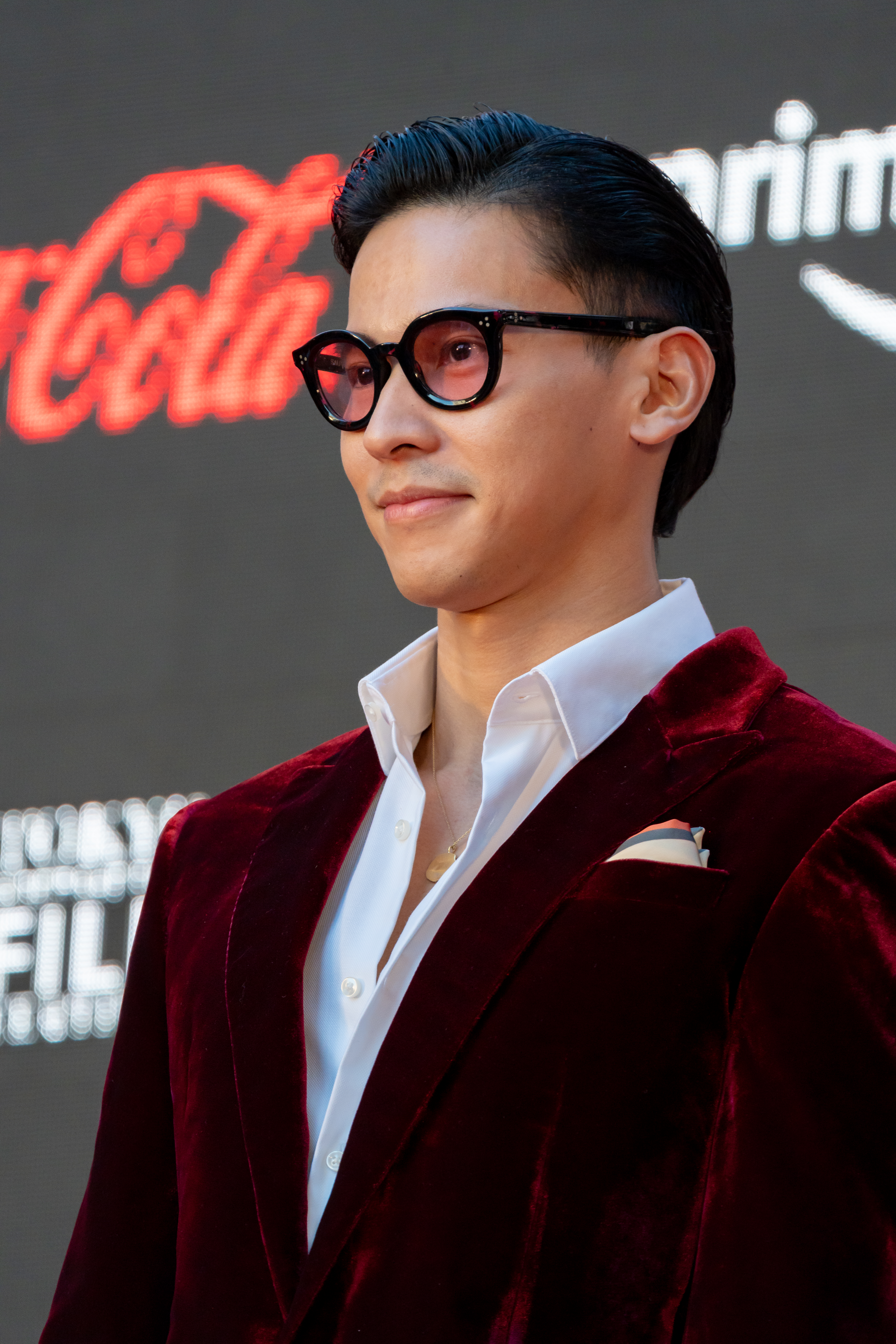
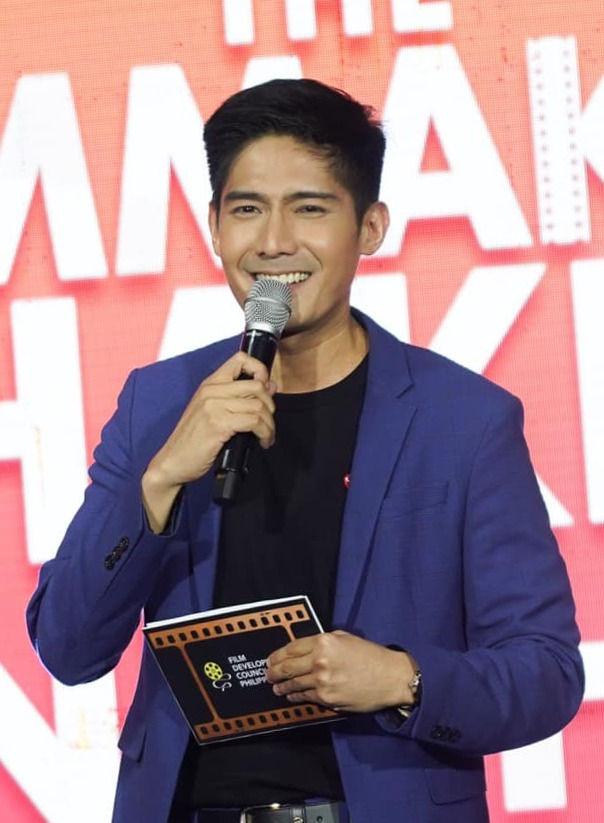
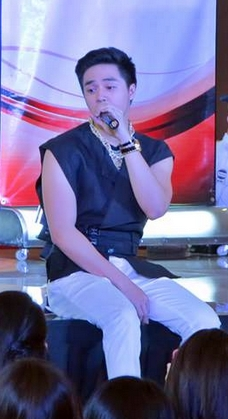
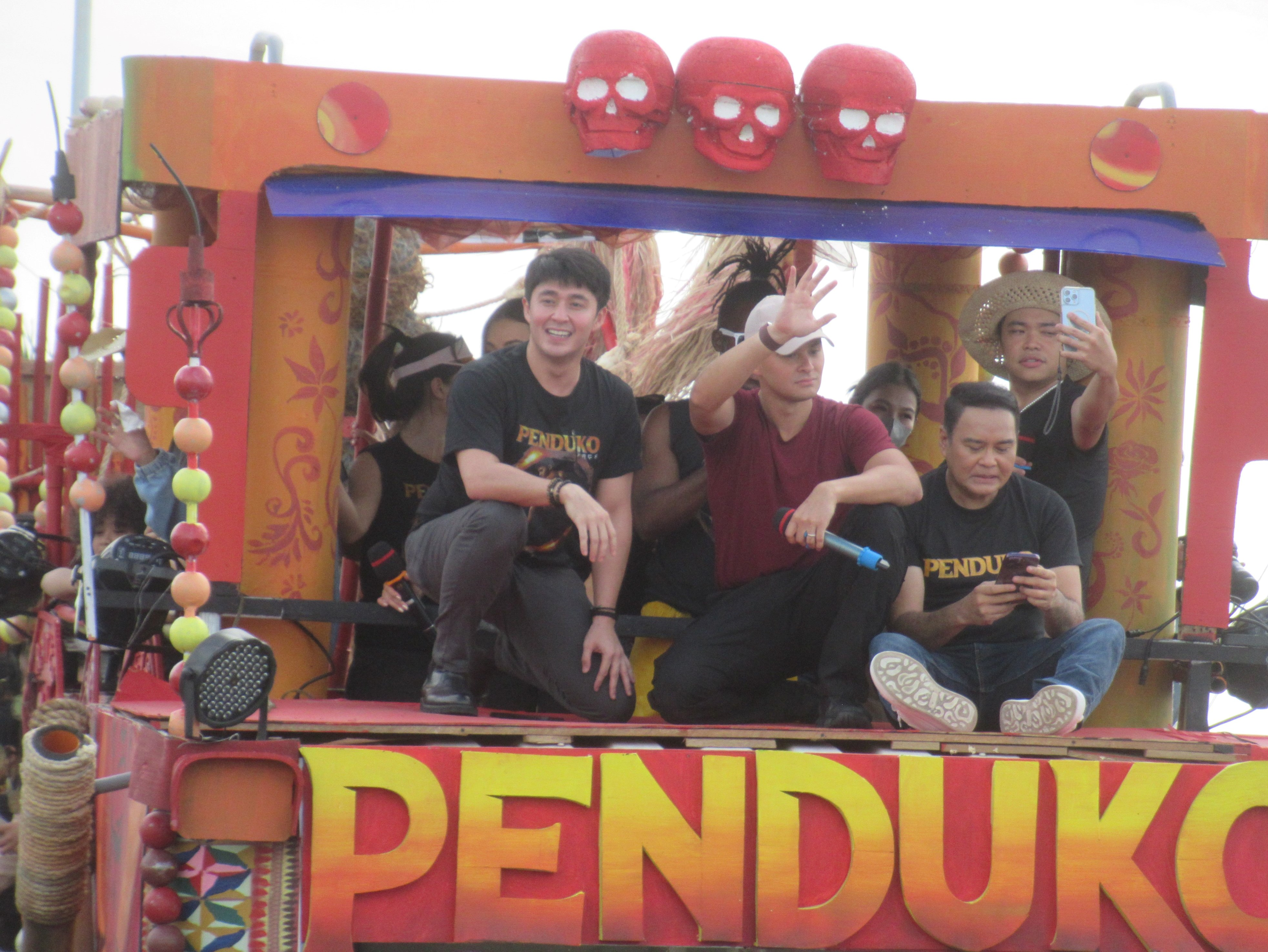
Enchong Dee, Robi Domingo, Sam Concepcion and Arron Villaflor Your Song Presents: Boystown Cast

=== Main cast ===
- Enchong Dee as Arnel de La Cruz – For someone whose life has no sense of direction for the longest time, Arnel surprisingly possesses an enviable skill in swimming that can open doors of opportunities for him.
- Robi Domingo as Arkin Sebastian – There is nothing else he could ask for in life because he already has a wealthy family, good education, and the perfect girlfriend. But living up to his dad’s exceedingly high expectations is next to impossible, and it makes him rebel against him even more.
- Sam Concepcion as Bobet – His mom abandoned him at Boystown many years ago. However, he hasn't forgotten about her promise to come back for him when he turns 17 years old.
- AJ Perez as Ricky – He left home when he was 12 years old to escape domestic violence and has resided in Boystown since then. Amongst his peers, he is the disciplinarian and a stickler for details, especially when it comes to following house rules.
- Dino Imperial as Chad – As the resident jerk, he is the one starting most of the fights between his influential group and the boys in Cottage No.5. Deep down he harbors hatred towards relationship-wreckers because it reminds him how his dad left his mom for another woman.
- Arron Villaflor as Raul – At an early age, he learned that life is a jungle and it’s up to him to do whatever it takes to survive without relying to anyone else for help. But coming to Boystown will definitely give him a fresh outlook and become more open towards other people.
- Chris Gutierrez as Brent – He doesn't have a sense of identity, and he looks up to the wrong guy in terms of making his decisions. This often leads him into all sorts of trouble because he never really had proper guidance from his parents.

=== Supporting cast ===
- Jessy Mendiola as Karen
- Martin del Rosario as Otap
- Ron Morales as Greg
- Romnick Sarmienta as Daniel
- Cris Villanueva as Antonio Santillian
- Ana Roces as Glenda Santillian
- Chiqui Del Carmen as Letty Sanchez
- RR Enriquez as Nurse Pamela

== See also ==
- Your Song (Philippine TV series)
- List of shows previously aired by ABS-CBN
- Boystown
