= Amalia Fuentes =

Filipino actress (1940–2019)

- Fuentes in 1966
- Born: Amalia Amador Muhlach; August 27, 1940; Naga, Camarines Sur, Commonwealth of the Philippines
- Died: October 5, 2019 (aged 79); St. Luke's Medical Center – Global City, Taguig, Philippines
- Resting place: Loyola Memorial Park - Marikina, Philippines
- Occupations: Actress, writer, director, producer
- Years active: 1956–2013
- Spouses: Romeo Vasquez (m. 1965; div. 1969) Joey Stevens (divorced)
- Children: 2 incl. Liezl Sumilang
- Parent(s): Alvaro Muhlach Sr. (father); Concepcion Amador (mother); Isagani Fuentes (stepfather)
- Relatives: Aga Muhlach (nephew); Nino Muhlach (nephew); AJ Muhlach (nephew); Alonzo Muhlach (grandnephew); Albert Martinez (son-in-law)
- Family: Alvaro Mulach (brother); Alexander Mulach (brother); Alfonso Martinez (grandson) Alissa Martinez (granddaughter)

Signature
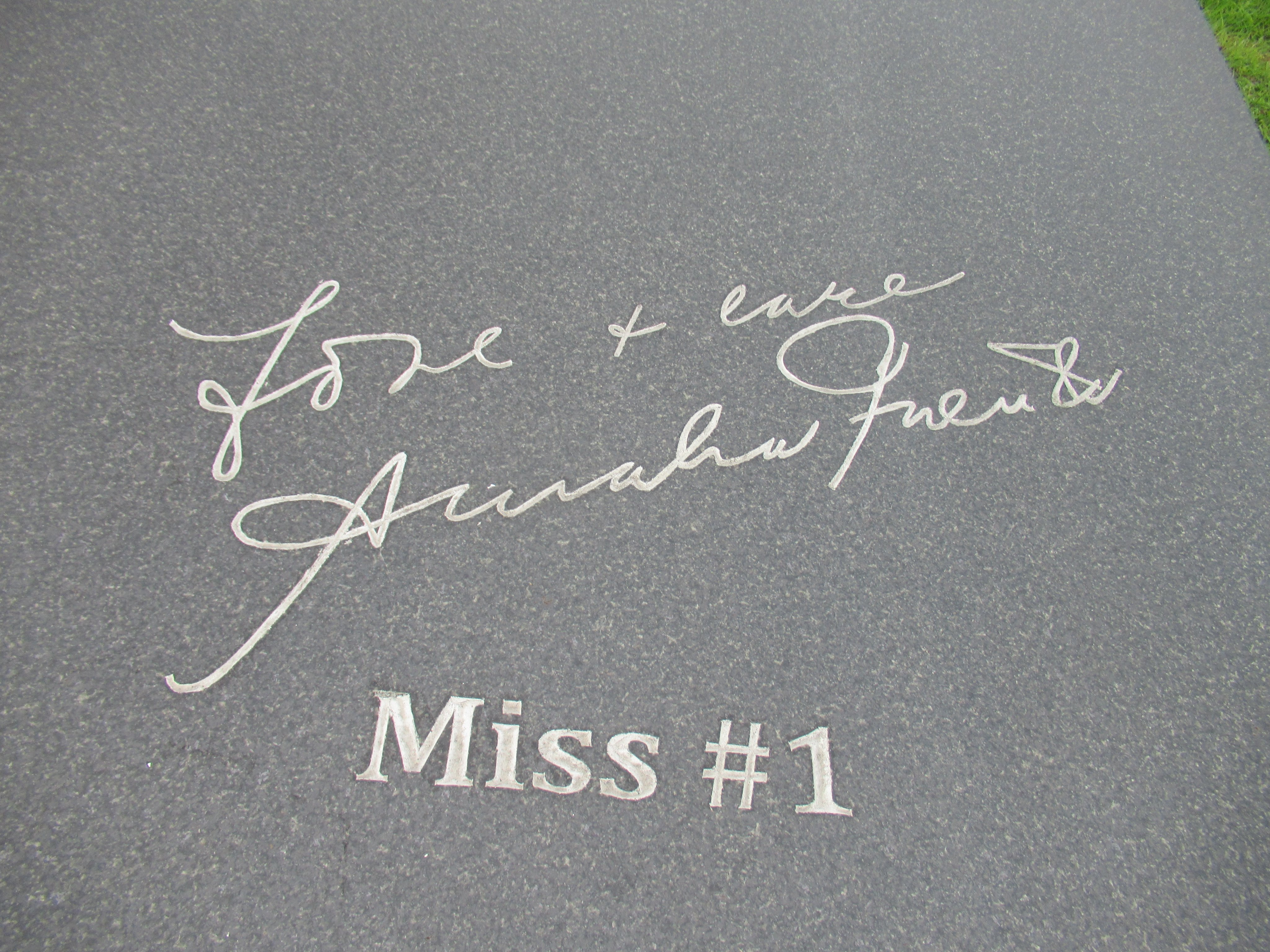

Amalia Amador Muhlach (August 27, 1940 – October 5, 2019), commonly known as Amalia Fuentes (Tagalog: [ɐˈmalja ˈfwɛntɛs]), was a Filipino actress and filmmaker whose career spanned six decades. She was the Queen of Philippine Movies in the 1960s and one of the top box-office draws of the 60s and 70s. Fuentes was one of the richest Filipino actresses in history and has received nine FAMAS Award for Best Actress nominations, winning one for Ibulong Mo Sa Hangin (1966). She was the first recipient of Box Office Queen Award in 1970 from the Guillermo Mendoza Scholarship Foundation.

== Career ==
In 1956, Fuentes and fellow actor Juancho Gutierrez won Sampaguita Pictures' Mr. & Ms. Number One contest. Sampaguita Pictures launched Amalia and Juancho into full stardom in the 1956 film Movie Fan. They were initially paired as a "love team" – popular in Philippine cinema – by Sampaguita Pictures, and both starred in Rodora (1956), Sonata (1957), Pakiusap (1959), Ang Senyorito at Ang Atsay (1963) among others. She was also paired as love team with Romeo Vasquez in Pretty Boy (1957), Bobby (1958), Ako Ang May Sala (1958) and Bilanggong Birhen (1960) among others.

She starred in such notable films as, Estela Mondragon (1960) starring Carmen Rosales, Amy, Susie, Tessie (1960) with Susan Roces, Tessie Agana, Joey, Eddie, Lito (1961) starring Jose Mari Gonzales, Eddie Gutierrez, Lito Legaspi, Dayukdok (1961) with Carmen Rosales, Luis Gonzales, Barbara Perez and Amaliang Mali-Mali (1962) with Luis Gonzales.

Fuentes wrote the screenplay for the films Tatlong Kasaysayan ng Pag-ibig (1966), and Ito ang Aming Kasunduan (1973). She starred in and directed Mga Reynang Walang Trono (1976). Fuentes has her own production company, AM (Amalia Muhlach) Productions. She produced several movies, most notable of which are: Whisper to the Wind (1966), Baril at Rosaryo (1967), and Pwede Ako Pwede Ka Pa Ba? (1976). Her last acting role was for the ABS CBN teleserye Huwag Ka Lang Mawawala (2013) with Judy Ann Santos.

She won Best Actress Awards from Famas in 1966 for Ibulong Mo Sa Hangin and in the 1973 Manila Film Festival for the movie Pagibig Mo Buhay Ko!

Fuentes was a member of the Movie and Television Review and Classification Board (MTRCB). She appeared in more than 130 films.

== Personal life ==
Fuentes was born Amalia Amador Muhlach in Bicol. Her family has Spanish (Asturian), German and Chinese roots. Her father, Álvaro Muhlach Agüera, was born in Barcelona, Spain, to Alejandro Muhlach Agüera and Enriqueta Agüera Iglesias, who were from Santander and Comillas, respectively both in Cantabria, but their ancestry originated from Asturias; Alejandro's father is a descendant of German settlers in Spain. Her mother Concepción Borja Amador was born in Xiamen, China, to a Chinese father and a Bicolano mother from Goa, Camarines Sur. She was educated in Davao Central College.

Her father died during the war and as the eldest child, she became the family breadwinner. Her two younger brothers, Alex and Alvaro, are also actors. Amalia married fellow actor Romeo Vasquez in 1965 in Hong Kong but they separated in 1969. They had a daughter, Liezl Sumilang (wife of actor Albert Martinez).

After her divorce from Vasquez, Amalia married Joey Stevens, an American businessman with whom she adopted a son, Geric Stevens. In the aftermath of the People Power Revolution, Stevens' bank accounts were frozen due to allegations of him being a crony of ousted president Ferdinand Marcos, upon which Fuentes participated in at least one pro-Marcos rally out of spite to the administration of Corazon Aquino. She divorced Stevens after 28 years of marriage, citing infidelity. Stevens died in 2012.

After retiring from films in 2013, she suffered a stroke while on vacation in South Korea.

== Death ==
Fuentes died on October 5, 2019, due to cardiac arrest and multiple organ failures. She and family are buried at Loyola Memorial Park.

== Accolades ==
Awards and nominations received by Amalia Fuentes
Organizations	Year (Note: Indicates the year of ceremony. Each year is linked to the article about the awards held that year, wherever possible.)	Recipient(s)	Category	Result	Ref.
Box Office Entertainment Awards	1970	Amalia Fuentes	Box Office Queen	Won	
FAMAS Award	1965	Kulay Dugo ang Gabi	Best Actress	Nominated	
FAMAS Award	1966	Sapagkat Ikaw Ay Akin	Best Actress	Nominated	
FAMAS Award	1967	Ibulong Mo sa Hangin	Best Actress	Won	
FAMAS Award	1968	O! Pagsintang Labis	Best Actress	Nominated	
FAMAS Award	1970	Kapatid Ko ang Aking Ina	Best Actress	Nominated	
FAMAS Award	1972	Divina Bastarda	Best Actress	Nominated	
FAMAS Award	1973	Babae... Ikaw ang Dahilan!	Best Actress	Nominated	
FAMAS Award	1974	Pag-ibig Mo, Buhay Ko	Best Actress	Nominated	
FAMAS Award	1975	Isang Gabi... Tatlong Babae!	Best Actress	Nominated	
FAMAS Award	2017	Amalia Fuentes	Lifetime Achievement Award	Won	
Gawad Pasado	2017	Amalia Fuentes	Lifetime Achievement Award	Won	
Manila Film Festival	1973	Pag-ibig Mo, Buhay Ko	Best Actress	Won	
Star Award for Movies	2016	Amalia Fuentes	Ulirang Artista Lifetime Achievement Award	Won	
The EDDYS	2019	Amalia Fuentes	Icon Award	Won	

== Filmography ==
=== Film ===
Year	Title	Role
1955	Prince Charming	
1956	Rodora	
1956	Movie Fan	
1957	Hahabul-Habol	
1958	Madaling Araw	
1959	Kahapon Lamang	
1959	Ipinagbili Ko Ang Aking Anak	
1960	Isinakdal Ko Ang Aking Ama	
1961	Joey, Eddie, Lito	Amy
1962	Pitong Puso	
1963	Esperanza at Caridad	Caridad
1964	Mga Daliring Ginto	
1965	Dream Girl	
1966	Tatlong Kasaysayan ng Pag-ibig	I-Betty, II-Cynthia, III-Tina
1966	Ikaw... ang Gabi at ang Awit (Arrivederci Roma)	
1967	Baril at Rosaryo	
1968	Gaano Kita Kamahal	
1968	Sa Manlulupig Di Ka Pasisiil	
1969	Adriana	Adriana
1969	Kapatid Ko Ang Aking Ina	
1969	Lorela	Lorela
1970	Mga Batong Buhay	Arminda
1971	Europe Here We Come!	
1972	Huwag Mong Angkinin Ang Asawa Ko!	
1973	Sa Aming Muling Pagkikita	
1974	Durugin Ang Mga Diyablo Sa Punta Fuego	
1974	Urduja	
1975	Isinumpa	
1975	Lulubog Lilitaw sa Ilalim ng Tulay	Amalia Marinella Fuentebella
1975	May Lalaki sa Ilalim ng Kama Ko	
1976	Ang Boyfriend Kong Baduy	
1976	Babaing Hiwalay sa Asawa	
1977	Huwag Pipitas ng Bubot Na Bunga	
1978	Buhay: Ako sa Itaas, Ikaw sa Ibaba	
1979	Pagmamahal Mo Buhay Ko	
1980	Aguila	Isabel
1980	Palaban	
1981	Dirty Games	
1982	My Only Love	Camille
1983	Indecent Exposure	
1984	Paano Ba ang Magmahal?	
1987	Asawa Ko Huwag Mong Agawin	Dr. Alice Paredes
1990	Higit Na Matimbang ang Dugo	
1996	Reputasyon	

=== Television ===
Year	Title	Role	Note(s)
2008	Kahit Isang Saglit		
2013	Huwag Ka Lang Mawawala	Dr. Maria Balaguer	

== Gallery ==
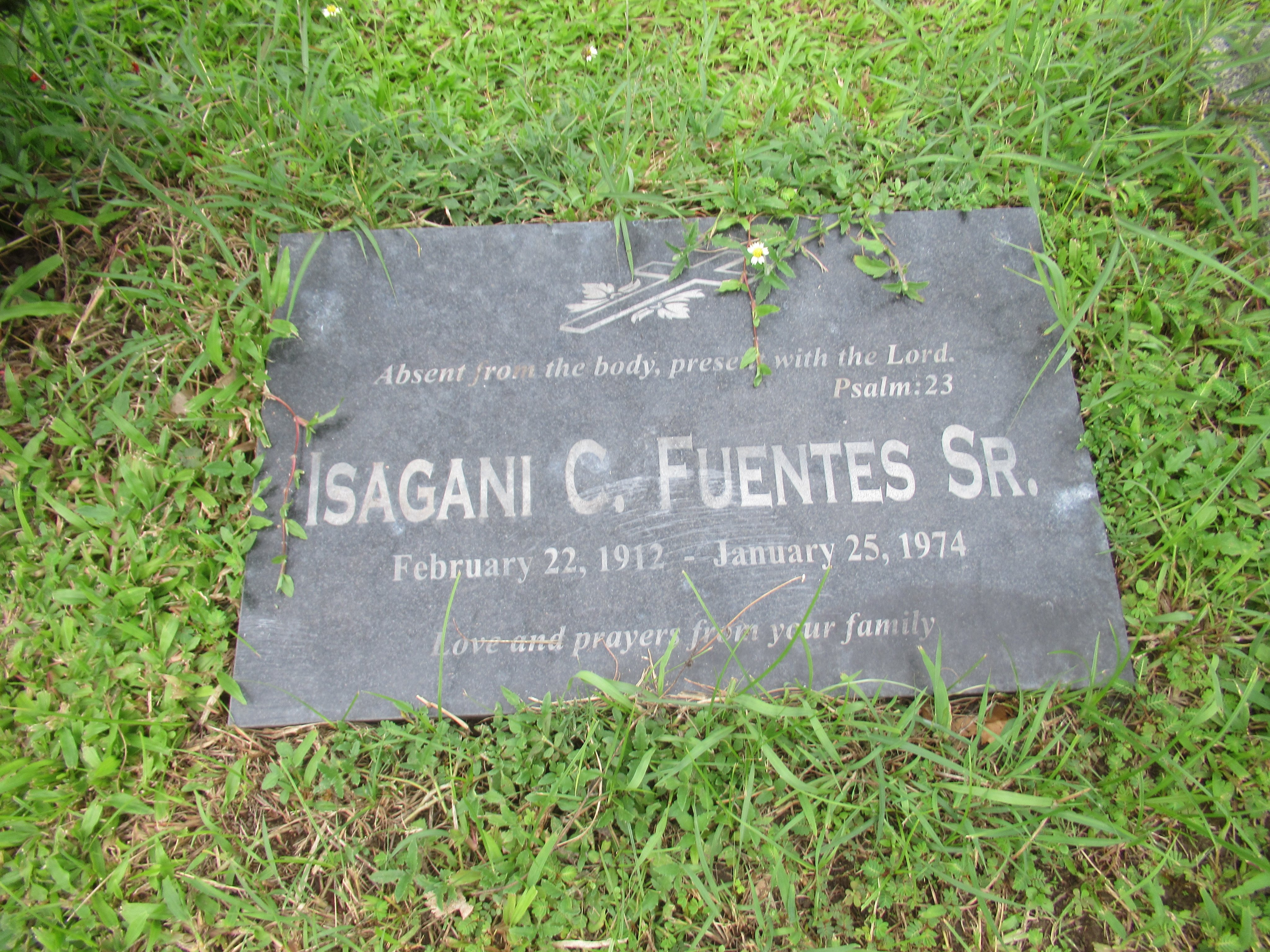
Isagani C.Fuentes, Sr. tomb

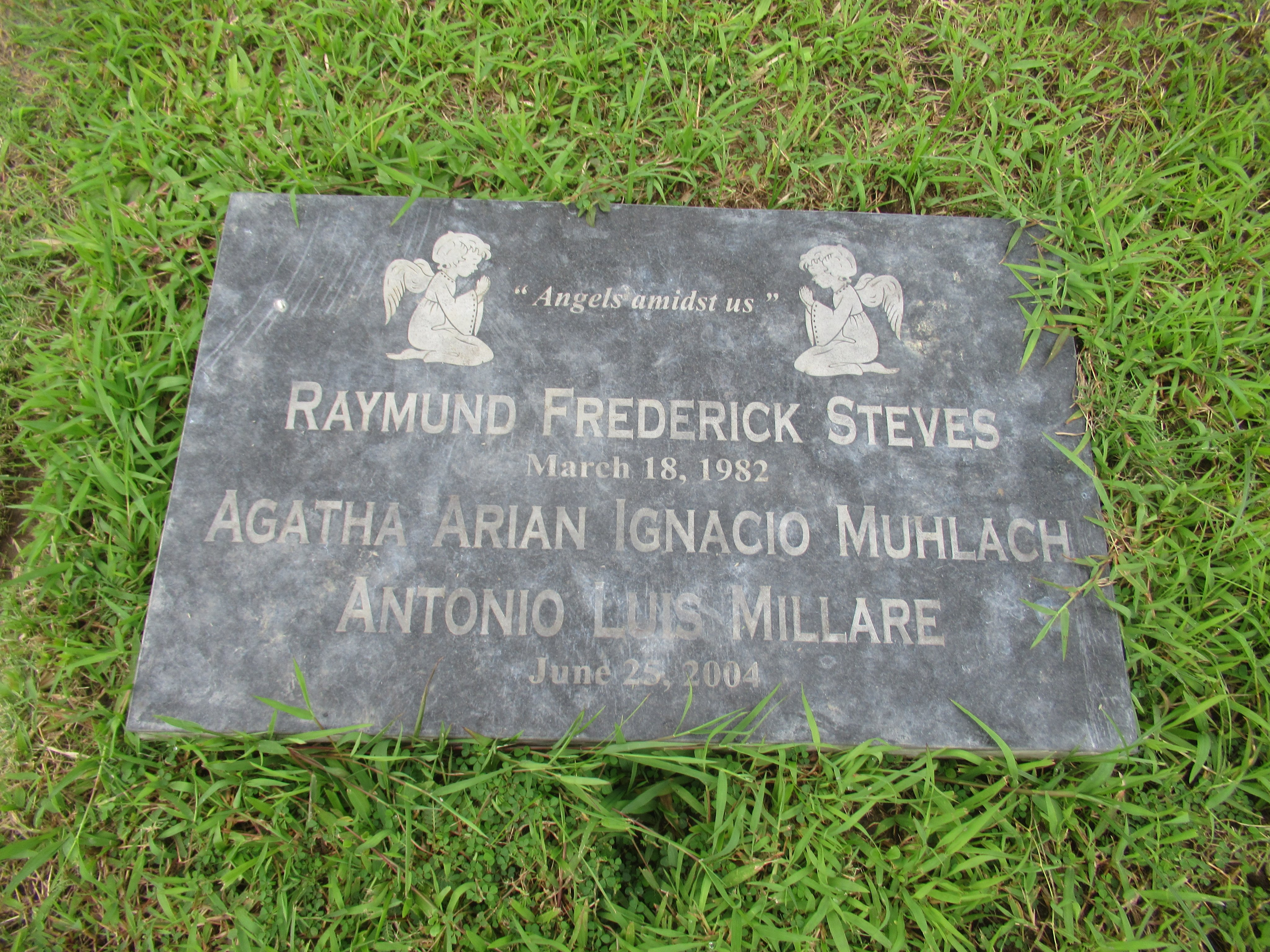
Raymund Frederick Steves, Agatha Arian Ignacio Muhlach and Antonio Luis Millare

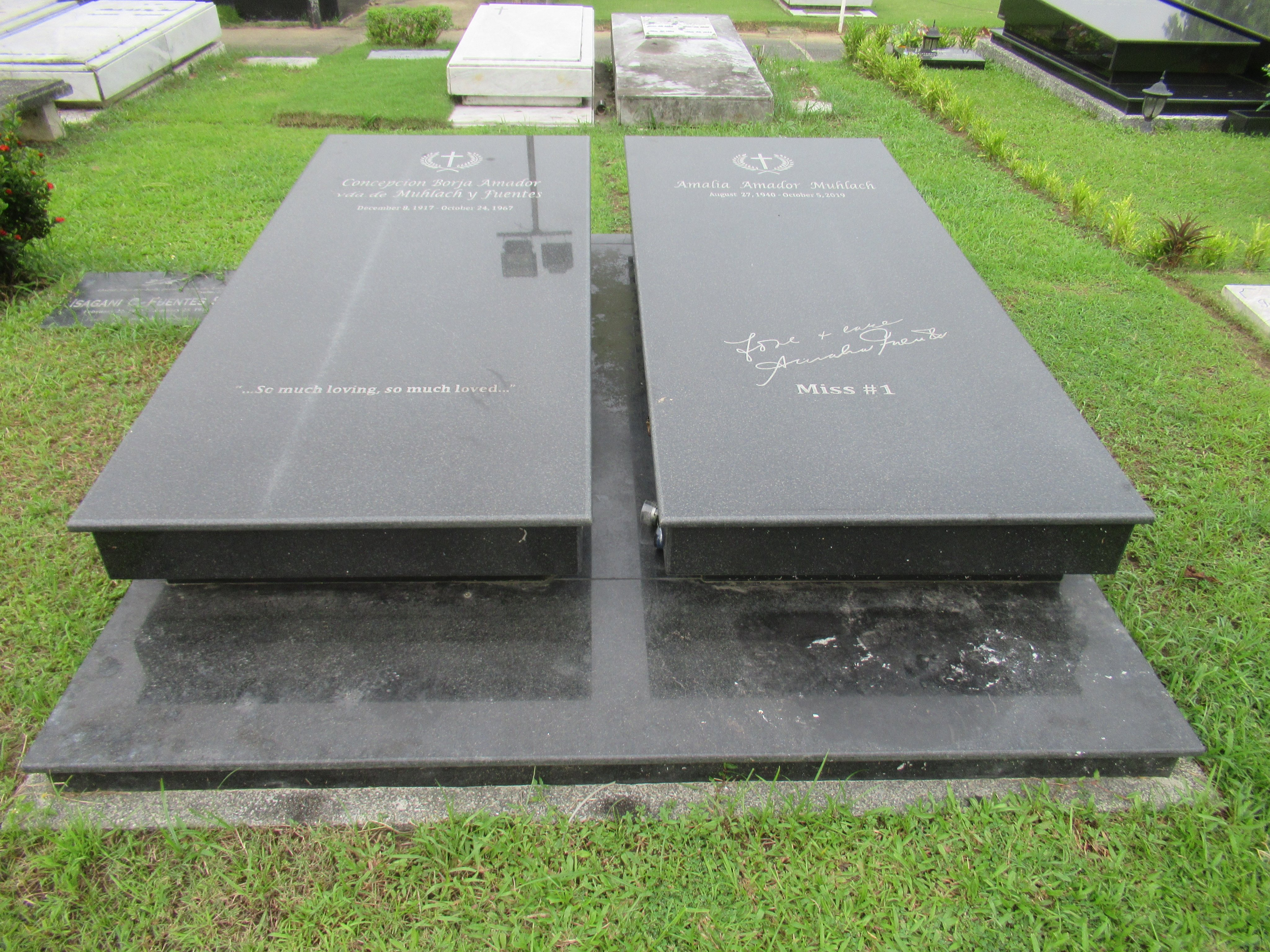
Loyola Memorial Park family grave

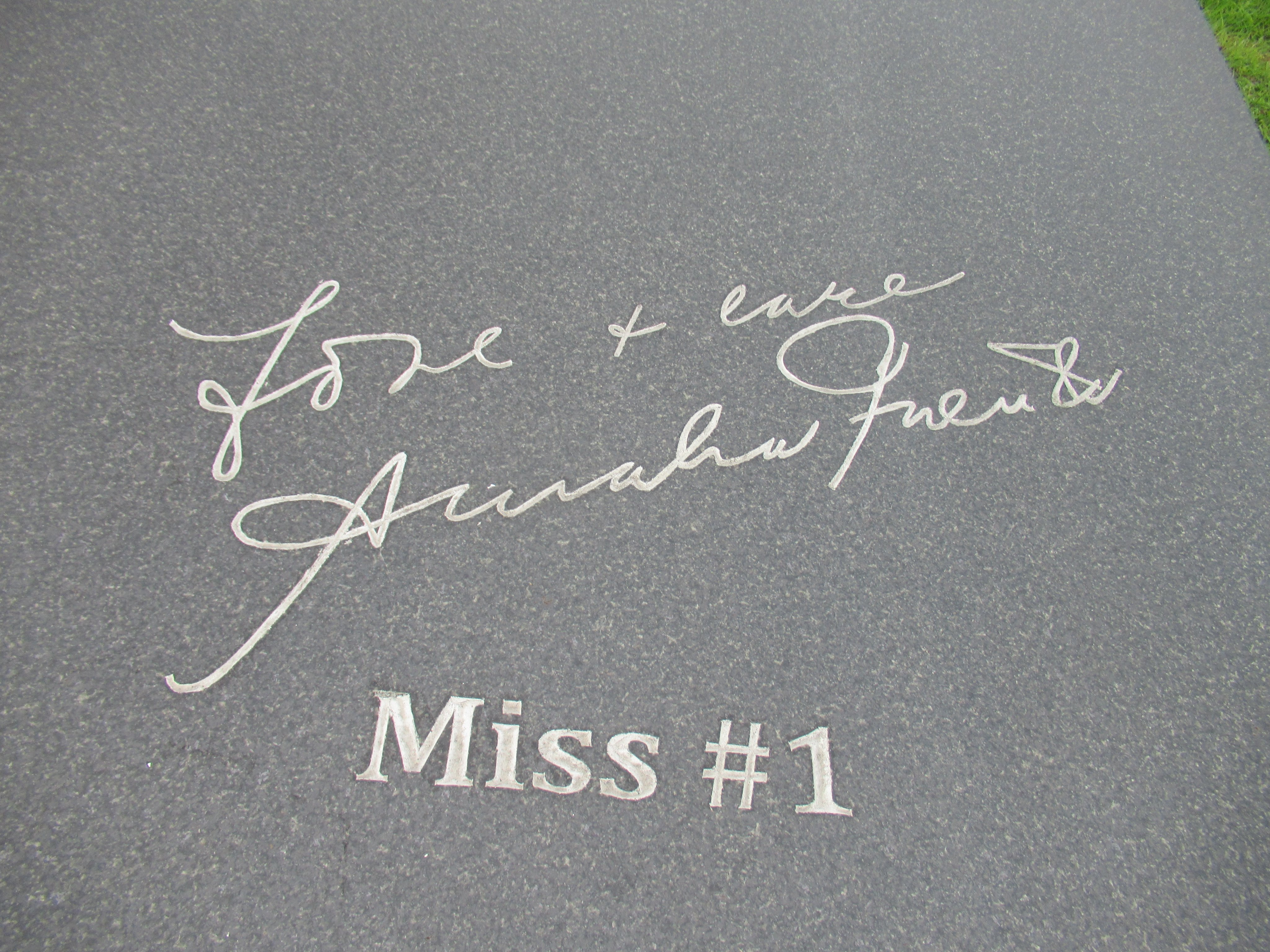
Fuentes signature

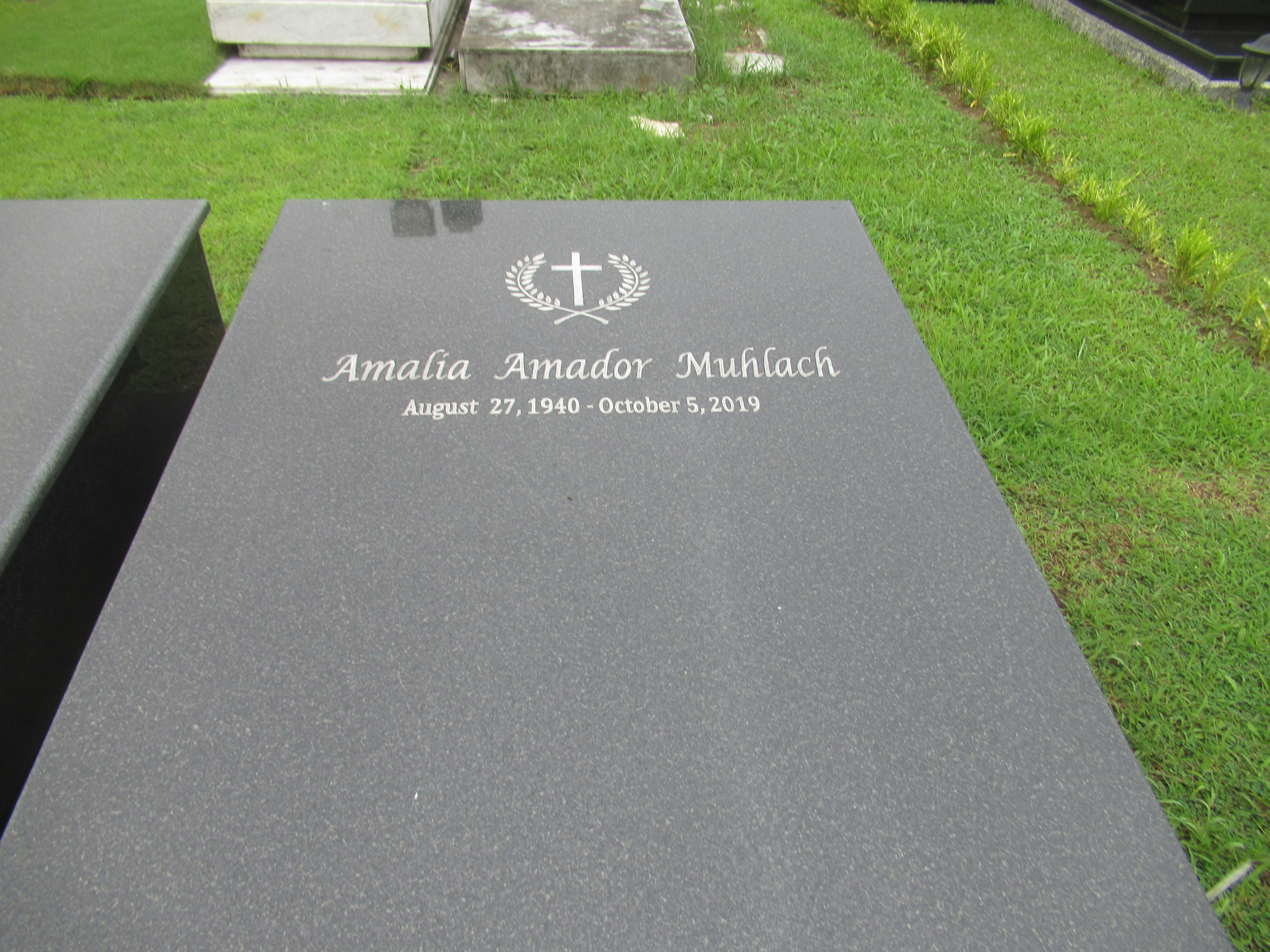
Fuentes tomb

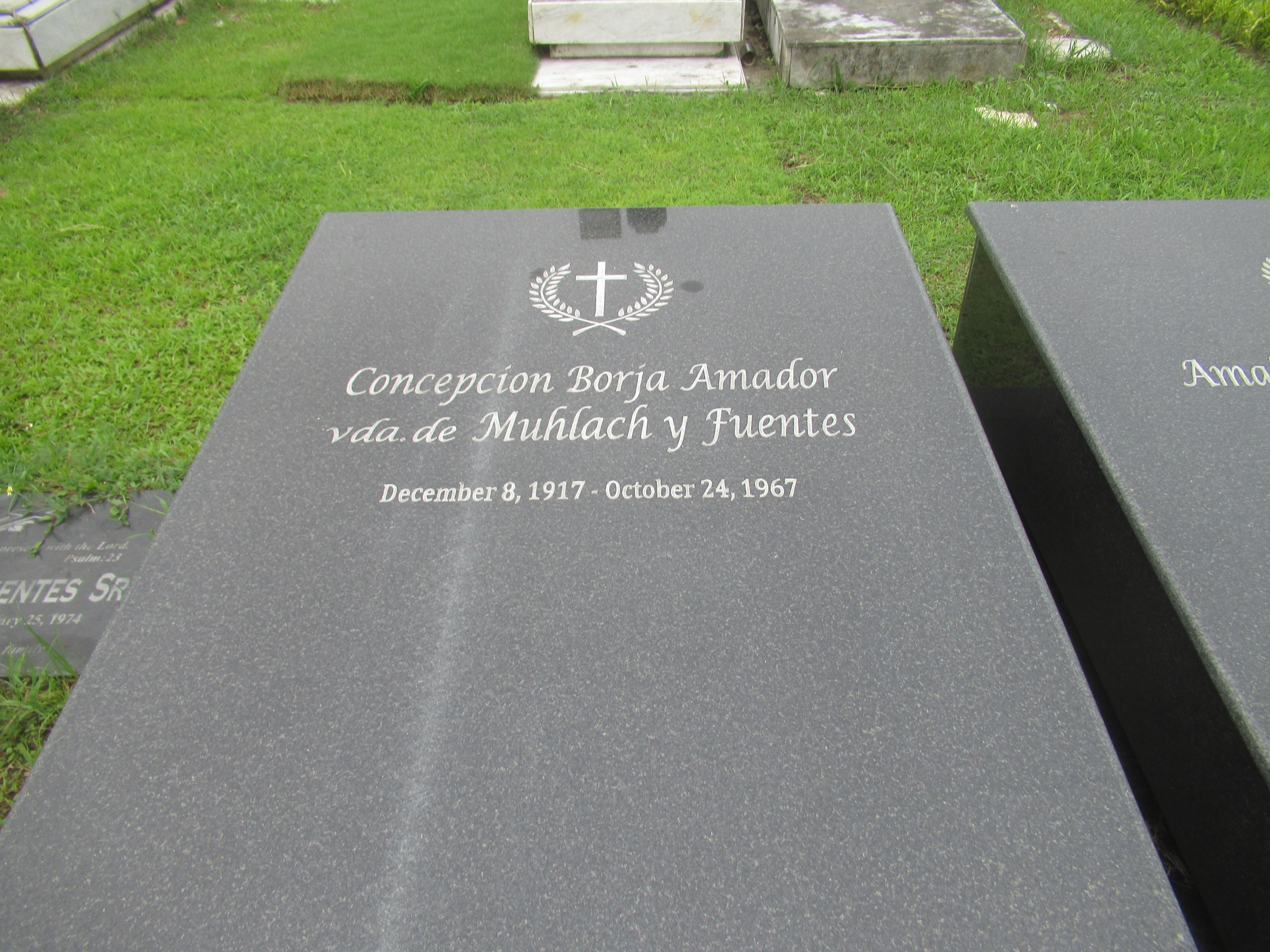
Concepcion Borja Amador
