= Max Collins (actress) =

American-Filipino actress and model

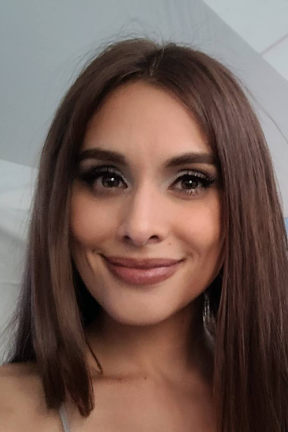
- Collins in 2026
- Born: Isabelle Abiera Collins; August 28, 1992 (age 34); Vallejo, California, United States
- Other name: Isabelle Abiera
- Citizenship: United States; Philippines
- Occupations: Actress; model
- Years active: 2003–present
- Spouse: Pancho Magno (m. 2017; div. 2023)
- Children: 1
- Relatives: Megan Young (cousin); Lauren Young (cousin)
- Modeling information
- Height: 168 cm (5 ft 6 in)
- Hair color: Brown
- Eye color: Brown
- Agency: Star Magic (2006–2010); Sparkle (2011–present)

Isabelle "Max" Abiera Collins (born August 28, 1992) is a Filipino actress and model. She is currently an exclusive artist of GMA Network, where she has appeared in several of the network's television shows.

== Early life ==
Isabelle Abiera Collins was born on August 28, 1992 in Vallejo, California, United States. Her mother is a Filipino from Kalibo, Aklan whilst her father is an American of Irish-Italian descent. Her parents met in Los Angeles while her mother was working at Bloomingdale's. Her parents separated when she was four years old. Her mother remarried when she was 9 years old. She has a younger half-brother.

Collins, along with her family, moved from Vallejo to Kalibo when she was 10 years old. For four years, she lived in Boracay and attended Brent School Boracay.

== Career ==
=== 2006–2010: Early years in ABS–CBN ===
Collins started doing commercials when she was 10. She has also appeared in magazines like Meg, Candy, Mega, People and Seventeen. According to her, she was discovered by a talent scout when she accidentally walked into a shop while a shoot was ongoing. After a year she was brought to ABS-CBN, Tried out a VTR with Star Magic, and got a call back after a month. Eventually she qualified for Star Magic Batch 15.

Collins was just 13 when she was launched as a Star Magic Batch 15 member. Under her stage name Isabelle Abiera, she did small roles in ABS-CBN's Star Magic Presents: Astigs and Star Magic Presents: Abt Ur Luv Ur Lyf 2 She also had a short hosting stint in Channel V. However, her entertainment career was put on a hold when she left for the United States. She was endorser of SunSilk Co-Creations in 2010 along with Shaina Magdayao, Nikki Gil and Sam Pinto.

Collins made a comeback into the Philippine entertainment industry as one of the regular hosts of the defunct noontime program Wowowee, at the same time she appeared as Veronica in the afternoon TV series Rosalka. She played a planted gate crasher in Pinoy Big Brother: Teen Clash 2010. When Rosalka ended, she went on to play Christy in Precious Hearts Romances Presents: Alyna.

=== 2011–present: Transfer to GMA Network ===
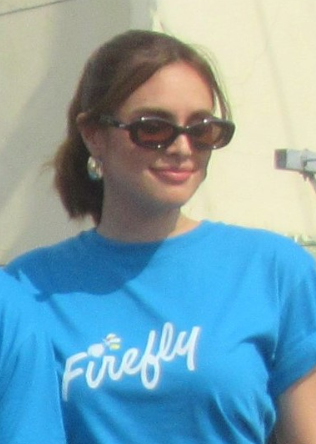
Collins at the 2023 Metro Manila Film Festival parade of stars

In 2010, when her contract with Star Magic ended, Collins left for the United States to "figure things out". A year after, she returned to the Philippines to relaunch her entertainment career. She changed her agent to Perry Lansigan's PPL Entertainment, Inc., changed her stage name to Max Collins, and finally signed an exclusive contract with GMA Network.

In 2012, she starred as a supporting role in her first afternoon series project under GMA Network, The Good Daughter and plays as Bea's (Kylie Padilla) best friend and a secret lover of Darwin. She also appeared in some episodes of Maynila. She also starred in Primetime TV series Pahiram ng Sandali with Dingdong Dantes, alongside Lorna Tolentino and Boyet de Leon.

In March 2015, Collins appeared as a cover girl for FHM Philippines's 15th anniversary issue, which she co-headlined with Tricia Santos and PBA courtside reporter Rizza Diaz. Collins was included on the top 10 of the 2015 FHM 100 Sexiest Woman, Collins was on the ninth spot.

== Personal life ==
Collins is a cousin of actresses Lauren Young and Megan Young. She is close friends with actress Jessy Mendiola. She was baptized as a Born-again Christian in October 2015.

Collins married Pancho Magno in Manila on December 11, 2017. On July 6, 2020, she gave birth to their son, Skye Anakin via water birth. In May 2023, Collins confirmed her separation with Magno. They divorced in October 2024.

== Filmography ==
=== Film ===
Year	Title	Role	Notes	Source
2013	Bamboo Flowers	Dolores		
2016	Remembering Ada	Ada Tanglao		
2018	Citizen Jake	Mandy		
2018	Rainbow's Sunset	Young Sylvia		
2023	Voltes V: Legacy – The Cinematic Experience	Rozalia		
2023	Firefly	Abby		
TBA	The Sacrifice	Anne		
TBA	Big Tiger			

=== Television ===
Year	Title	Role	Notes	Source
2007	Star Magic Presents: Abt Ur Luv Ur Lyf 2	Fiona		
2008	Star Magic Presents: Astigs in Haay...skul Lyf	Kimberly		
2008	Star Magic Presents: Astigs in Luvin lyf	Ice		
2008	Your Song Presents: Imposible	Paige's Friend		
2008	Your Song Presents: Kapag Ako Ay Nagmahal	Ballet Dancer		
2008	Maalaala Mo Kaya	Neneng	Episode: "Notebook"	
2010	Midnight DJ	Sasha	Guest, Episode: "Monster Valentine"	
2010	Wowowee	Herself	Host	
2010	Pinoy Big Brother: Teen Clash 2010	Herself	Houseguest	
2010	Rosalka	Veronica Dominguez		
2010	Your Song	Daisy's sister	Episode: "Catch Me I'm Falling"	
2010	Precious Hearts Romances Presents: Alyna	Christy		
2012	The Good Daughter	Ziri Claustro-Reyes		
2012	Maynila	Meg	Episode: "Star Collision"	
2012	Maynila	Alexa		
2012	Coffee Prince	Arlene Manahan		
2012–16	Bubble Gang	Various characters		
2012–13	Party Pilipinas	Herself	Host / Performer	
2012–13	Pahiram ng Sandali	Cindy Reyes		
2013	Magpakailanman	Becca	Episode: "Bayarang Adonis"	
2013	With a Smile	Patricia Vincencio		
2013	Wagas	Raquel	Story: "Partner"	
2013–15	Sunday All Stars	Herself	Host / Performer	
2014	Innamorata	Esperanza "Esper" Cunanan-Manansala / Evangeline Cunanan / Alejandra		
2014	Magpakailanman	Maxima	Episode: "Yaya Luningning"	
2014	Ilustrado	Consuelo Ortiga		
2015	Kailan Ba Tama ang Mali?	Amanda Realonda-Vasquez		
2015	Maynila	Julie	Episode: "Once a Princess"	
2015	Maynila	Caitlin	Episode: "My Imported GF"	
2015	Juan Tamad	Marie Guiguinto		
2015	Day Off	Herself	Guest	
2016	Magpakailanman	Malen	Episode: "Crime of Passion"	
2016	Encantadia	Amihan I		
2016–17	Someone to Watch Over Me	Irene Montenegro-Fernando		
2016	Magpakailanman	Rachel	Episode: "Ang Sundalong Magiting"	
2017	Legally Blind	Darlene Santos-Aguirre	Guest	
2017	Dear Uge	Janet	Episode: "Plastikan"	
2017	Road Trip	Herself	Guest	
2017	Meant to Be	Miss Onay Wiz	Guest	
2017	Wish Ko Lang	Aileen	Episode: "Si Aileen at si Alexa"	
2018	The One That Got Away	Darlene "Darcy" Sibuyan-Sandoval		
2018	Daig Kayo ng Lola Ko	Bella	Episode: "Beauty and the Beast"	
2018	Contessa	Perfida Ledesma	Guest	
2019	Bihag	Jessica "Jessie" Medina-Alejandro		
2019	Alex and Amie	Bing Lopez		
2020	Anak ni Waray vs. Anak ni Biday	young Amy Malatamban		
2021	To Have & To Hold	Dominique "Dom" Ramirez		
2022	Happy ToGetHer	Summer		
2023	Abot-Kamay na Pangarap	Izzy	Special Participation	
2023	Voltes V: Legacy	Rozalia	Special Participation	
2023	Walang Matigas na Pulis sa Matinik na Misis	Elizabeth "Elize / Puso" de Dios		
2023	Almost Paradise	Ann Villegas	Season 2	
2023–present	It's Showtime	Herself	Guest / Performer	
2024	My Guardian Alien	Venus del Mundo		
2024	Lilet Matias: Attorney-at-Law	Atty. Katarina Almodal	Guest role	
2024	Pulang Araw	Valeria "Yay" Panlilio	Guest role	
2025	Akusada	Jocelyn "Joi" Nadera-Santos	Guest role	
2026	The Master Cutter	Elaine / Audrey	Supporting role	

Preceded by Aiko Climaco	FHM Cover Girl (March 2015)	Succeeded by Patricia Javier
