= Niño Muhlach =

Filipino actor (born 1971)

- Born: Angelo Jose Rocha Muhlach; October 27, 1971 (age 54); Manila, Philippines
- Occupation: Actor
- Years active: 1974–present
- Children: Sandro Muhlach (son); Alonzo Muhlach (son)
- Relatives: Aga Muhlach (cousin); AJ Muhlach (cousin); Liezl Martinez (cousin); Amalia Fuentes (aunt); Alfonso Martinez (nephew); Nela Álvarez (maternal grandmother)

Niño Muhlach (born Angelo Jose Rocha Muhlach, October 27, 1971) is a Filipino actor. He is the father of Filipino child actor Alonzo Muhlach.

== Early life ==
Niño was born by Alexander Muhlach and Rebecca Rocha, he has five siblings. A nephew of Amalia Fuentes and Álvaro Muhlach, his cousins Aga and Arlene are also actors. He was the owner of D'Wonder Films, which produced most of his films in the 1970s/80s. He was dubbed the "Child Wonder of the Philippines" for making films that garnered both critical and commercial success. He holds the title of highest-paid child actor in the history of Filipino cinema.

He is currently owner of Megamelt Bakeshop, home of Muhlach Ensaymada located at Nicanor Domingo Street corner Mayor Ignacio Santos Díaz Street in the Cubao District of Quezon City. Megamelt started in 1993, when the Muhlach patriarch, Alexander Muhlach opened an Ensaïmada commissary upon N. Domingo Street, Cubao lot be purchased for Muhlach. Muhlach Ensaymada is managed by Angela Muhlach-Hortaleza.

== Personal life ==
He was married to Edith Millare from 2000–2005, they have one child, Alessandro Martinno Millare Muhlach (born on 2003). He has a second child, actor Alonzo Muhlach, with Diane Tupaz. He is of Spanish-German-Chinese descent.

In 2026, Muhlach crashed his car into several establishments in Antipolo, injuring a pedestrian. He admitted to falling asleep while driving due to fatigue.

== Filmography ==
=== Film ===
Year	Title	Role	Note(s)	Ref(s).
1974	Lulubog Lilitaw sa Ilalim ng Tulay	Chinky Ychavez		
1975	Ang Leon at ang Daga	Pongkoy		
1976	Harabas con Bulilit			
1976	Kutong Lupa			
1976	Bongbong	Bongbong		
1977	Peter Pandesal	Peter		
1977	Ang Pagbabalik ni Harabas at Bulilit			
1977	Jack en Poy	Poy		
1977	Tutubing Kalabaw, Tutubing Karayom			
1977	Amihan at Higibis			
1977	Binata ang Daddy Ko	Dominic		
1977	Tahan Na Empoy, Tahan	Empoy		
1977	Ang Teksas at ang Labuyo			
1978	Kaming Patok Na Patok			
1978	Magkaaway			
1978	Ang Tatay Kong Nanay	Nonoy		
1978	Bruce Liit	Bruce		
1978	Butsoy	Butsoy		
1979	Isa, Dalawa, Tatlo, ang Tatay Mong Kalbo!			
1979	Kakampi Ko ang Sto. Niño			
1979	Kuwatog	Kuwatog		
1979	Pepeng Kulisap			
1979	Bokyo	Bokyo		
1979	Agimat ni Pepe	Pepe		
1980	Nognog	Nognog		
1980	Juan Tamad Junior	Juan Tamad Jr.		
1980	Hepe	Hepe		
1980	Darna at Ding	Ding		
1980	Enteng-Anting	Enteng		
1980	Tempong	Tempong		
1981	Mga Basang Sisiw			
1981	Dos Bravos			
1981	Tropang Bulilit	Titoy		
1982	Juan Balutan			
1982	Tatlo Silang Tatay Ko			
1982	Roco, ang Batang Bato	Roco		
1982	Cuatro y Medya			
1983	Hula			
1983	D'Godson			
1983	Paano Ba ang Magmahal?			
1984	Nang Maghalo ang Balat sa Tinalupan	Boboy		
1985	Abandonado			
1985	Ma'am May We Go Out?	Einstein		
1985	Like Father, Like Son	Jonjon		
1986	Oks Na Oks Pakner			
1986	Kontra Bandido			
1987	Topo-Topo Barega			
1987	Working Girls 2			
1988	Pssst Boy... Halika			
1991	Sam en Miguel: No Basura, No Problema	Angelo		
1992	Sonny Boy: Public Enemy Number 1 of Cebu City			
1993	Ronquillo: Tubong Cavite, Laking Tondo	Bunso		
1993	Di Na Natuto (Sorry Na, Puede Ba?)	Turing		
1993	Buenaventura Daang: Bad Boys Gang			
1994	Swindler's List			
1994	Oo Na, Sige Na	Jimbo		
1994	Ikaw ang Miss Universe ng Buhay Ko	Bing		
1994	Cuardo de Jack	Jumbo		
1995	Dobol Trobol			
1995	Proboys	Dennis		
1996	Makamandang Na Bango			
1996	Oki Doki Doc: The Movie	Agent X-44		
1997	Wang-Wang: Buhay Bombero	Jordan		
1997	Sanggano	Siano		
1998	Buhawi Jack	Dino		
1998	Gangland			
1998	Techno Warriors	Bryan		
1998	Bilibid or Not			
1999	Markado			
2000	Minsan Ko Lang Sasabihin	Jason		
2001	Mahal Kita, Kahit Sino Ka Pa			
2007	One Percent Full	Shaquille		
2011	Slumber Party			
2013	On the Job	Ramon		
2013	Juana C. the Movie			
2014	Da Possessed	Singkit		
2014	She's Dating the Gangster	Present Kirby Araneta		
2014	My Big Bossing	Duke Chorvu	"Prinsesa" segment	
2015	Resureksyon	Mayor Diamante		
2015	1 Day, 1 Araw, I Saw Nakakita			
2017	Trip Ubusan: The Lolas vs. Zombies	Customer man		
2022	Faultline			

=== Television ===
Year	Title	Role	Notes
1983	Musmos Pa si Boss		
1986–91	That's Entertainment		
1988	Regal Shocker: Nang Gumanti ang mga Bangkay	Simeon	
1990–91	Pandakekoks		
1992–93	B Na B		
1993	Maalaala Mo Kaya: Alimasag		
1993	GMA Telesine Specials		
1994	Noli Me Tangere: The Series		
1994	Maalaala Mo Kaya: Boteng Basag		
1994	Tropang Trumpo		
1994	Maalaala Mo Kaya: Class Card		
1994	Love Notes		
1995	T.G.I.S.		
1995	Mikee		
1995	Bubble Gang	Guest	
1996	1896		
1996	Calvento Files: Paranaque Massacre	Dodie	
1998	Magandang Tanghali Bayan		
2000	Super Klenk		
2000	Kakabaka-Boo		
2001	Idol Ko si Kap		
2003	Daisy Siete		
2003	Masayang Tanghali Bayan		
2003	MTB: Ang Saya Saya		
2003	Kaya ni Mister, Kaya ni Misis		
2004	Tarajing Potpot		
2005	Magpakailanman		
2005	Bubble Gang Jr.		
2005	Noel		
2005	Hokus Pokus		
2005	Wowowee		
2005	Kakabakaba Adventures		
2006	Baywalk		
2006	Project 11		
2007	Sabi ni Nanay		
2007	Your Song Presents		
2008	Banana Split		
2008	Midnight DJ		
2008	Maynila		
2009	Talentadong Pinoy		
2010	Eat Bulaga!		
2010	Pilipinas Win Na Win		
2010	Willing Willie		
2010	Untold Stories Mula sa Face to Face		
2011	Magic Gimik		
2011	Star Confessions		
2013	Wansapanataym: Kukotakot	Papa	
2014	Home Sweetie Home		
2014	Ipaglaban Mo!		
2014	Wagas		
2015	Kapamilya Deal or No Deal	Briefcase No. 1	
2015	Gandang Gabi, Vice!	Guest	
2015	Alamat		
2015	Walang Tulugan with the Master Showman	Guest	
2015	Sabado Badoo		
2015	Karelasyon: Daddy Santa	Nico	
2015	Juan Tamad		
2015	Luv U	Santa	
2015	Wattpad Presents		
2016	Banana Sundae		
2016	Dear Uge		
2016	Hay, Bahay!	Adan	
2018	Wowowin	Guest	
2018; 2019	Magandang Buhay	Guest	
2022	Start-Up PH	Samuel "Mang Sammy" Navarro	
2023	Walang Matigas Na Pulis sa Matinik Na Misis	Police Capt. Sylvestre "Style" Salonga	
2023	TiktoClock	Himself (guest co-host)	
2023	It's Showtime	Himself (Mini Miss U judge)	
2024	The Bagman		
2024	FPJ's Batang Quiapo	Baste	
2026	Rainbow Rumble	Himself (contestant)	
