= Lauren Young =

Filipino-American singer (born 1993)

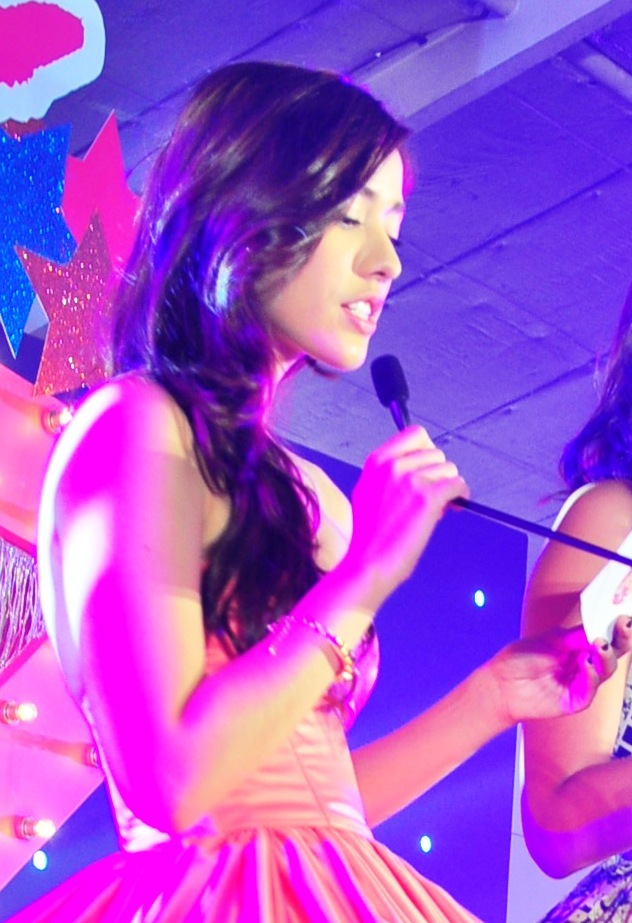
- Young at the Candy Style Awards, May 2013
- Born: November 8, 1993 (age 32); Alexandria, Virginia, U.S.
- Citizenship: United States; Philippines
- Education: Angelicum College; De La Salle–College of Saint Benilde
- Occupations: Actress, singer, model
- Years active: 2006–present
- Agents: Star Magic (2006–2012) GMA Artist Center (2013–2020); Brightlight Productions (2020–present)
- Relatives: Megan Young (sister); Max Collins (cousin)

Lauren Anne Talde Young (Note: Although Lauren Young was born in the United States of America, her official documents possess her mother's maiden name which is Talde.) (born November 8, 1993) is a Filipino and American actress, singer, and model. She is the younger sister of actress and Miss World 2013 Megan Young. She is currently an exclusive artist of GMA Network.

== Early life and education ==
Lauren Young was born on November 8, 1993. She is the youngest daughter of Calvin and Victoria Young. She finished high school at Angelicum College and studied culinary arts at De La Salle–College of Saint Benilde.

== Career ==
On June 17, 2006, Young made her acting debut in a cameo role in the two-part Komiks episode Bampy—a Star Magic 14th Anniversary special on ABS-CBN. She was one of the 20 new talents introduced as "Star Magic Batch 13". The same year, Young acted opposite Piolo Pascual in Star Magic Presents: All About A Girl and in Abt Ur Luv.

Young appeared in the commercially successful film One More Chance in 2007. In 2008, Young was in Your Song Presents: Impossible in 2008. In 2009, she acted in another episode of Your Song Presents: Underage, opposite AJ Perez.

In 2010, Young starred as Lorraine in the movie Sa 'Yo Lamang opposite Enchong Dee and appeared as the younger sister of Rodjun Cruz in Juanita Banana.

Young's breakout role was Via Pereira, played originally by Claudine Barretto, in ABS-CBN's 2011 remake of Mula Sa Puso.

=== Transfer to GMA Network ===
Young transferred to GMA Network in 2012.

Her first project in GMA Network was Mundo Mo'y Akin with Alden Richards and Louise delos Reyes, where she played the anti-hero role of Darlene Carbonel.

Young is the main protagonist of the teen drama suspense-thriller television series Dormitoryo with Enzo Pineda, Joyce Ching, Ruru Madrid, and Wynwyn Marquez. She played the role of Hazel Mendoza, who was determined to discover the truth behind the death of Maika Benitez (played by Wynwyn Marquez).

She also had her first mainstream film under GMA Films entitled Overtime, co-starring Richard Gutierrez.

In 2015, Young played one of the main antagonists (Antonia Santibañez) in Marimar, whose lead role was played by her real-life sister Megan Young. Marimar marks their second project together after Star Magic Presents: Abt Ur Luv Ur Lyf 2.

== Personal life ==
Young is a cousin of Max Collins. She began a relationship with Robbie Garcia on April 21, 2015. She began a relationship with Toby Panlilio in 2017. They engaged on February 5, 2026.

== Filmography ==
=== Television / Digital Series ===
Year	Title	Role	Notes	Source
2006	Star Magic Presents: All About A Girl	Lea	Support role	
2006–2007	Star Magic Presents: Abt Ur Luv	Maria Cornellia "Nelle" Brondial	Support role	
2006	Komiks Presents: Bampy	Herself	Cameo	
2006	Love Spell Presents: Wanted, Mr. Perfect			
2007	Your Song Presents: Kasalanan Ko Ba?	Maya		
2007	Your Song Presents: Even If	Lucy		
2007–2008	Star Magic Presents: Abt Ur Luv, Ur Lyf 2	Maria Cornellia "Nelle" Brondial-Smith	Support Role	
2007	Maalaala Mo Kaya	Young Elsa	Episode: "Telebisyon"	
2007	Love Spell Presents: Bato	Irish		
2008	Star Magic Presents: Astigs in Haay...School Lyf	Josielyn	Support role	
2008	Star Magic Presents: Astigs in Luvin' Lyf	Sandy	Main role	
2008	Your Song Presents: Imposible	Paige	Support role	
2008	Lobo	Zoey Cristobal	Recurring role	
2008	Maalaala Mo Kaya	Marites	Episode: "Board Game"	
2008–2009	Lipgloss	Karla	Recurring role	
2008	Maalaala Mo Kaya	Hermie	Episode: "Gayuma"	
2008	Maynila	Mia		
2009	Your Song Presents: Underage	Corazon Serrano	Main role	
2009	Maynila	Ruth		
2009	Midnight DJ	Kara	Episode: "Kambal Kuba"	
2009–2010	Dahil May Isang Ikaw	Rachelle	Support role	
2009	Maynila	Marie	Episode: "Life's Lesson"	
2009	Maalaala Mo Kaya	Joan	Episode: "Car"	
2009	Maalaala Mo Kaya	Russell	Episode: "Tsinelas"	
2010	Maynila	Sandy		
2010	Tanging Yaman	Cindy	Guest role	
2010	Midnight DJ	Linda San Juan / Lindsay	Episode: "JS Prom Nightmare"	
2010	Midnight DJ	Jessica "Jessie" Soriano	Episode: "Demonyong Hunyango"	
2010	Midnight DJ	Jessica "Jessie" Soriano	Episode: "Kalbaryo sa Sementeryo"	
2010	Midnight DJ	Jessica "Jessie" Soriano	Episode: "Bulong ng Demonyo"	
2010–2011	Pablo S. Gomez's Juanita Banana	Sunny Rose Buenaventura	Support role	
2010	Maalaala Mo Kaya	Eleng	Episode: "Xylophone"	
2010	Maynila	Iya		
2010	Midnight DJ	Jessie Soriano	Recurring role	
2010	Maalaala Mo Kaya	Young Zoraida	Episode: "Seaweeds"	
2011	Mula sa Puso	Olivia "Via" Pereira-Amarillo	Main role	
2012	Oka Tokat	Celestina	Guest role	
2012	Maalaala Mo Kaya	Nova	Episode: "School Uniform"	
2012	Maalaala Mo Kaya	Elnora	Episode: "Bahay"	
2013	Mundo Mo'y Akin	Darlene Smith	Main role	
2013	Dormitoryo	Hazel Mendoza / Hazel Benitez	Main role	
2013	Magkano Ba ang Pag-Ibig?	Young Lualhati Macaraeg	Special guest	
2013	Genesis	Sheila Reyes / Sheila Sebastian Santillian	Support role	
2014	Paraiso Ko'y Ikaw	Young Teresa Enriquez	Special guest	
2014–2015	Hiram na Alaala	Bethany Sandoval-Alcantara	Main role	
2014	Magpakailanman	Jenna Espinosa	Episode: "Barangay Cybersex"	
2014	Magpakailanman	Jonnalyn Bulado	Episode: "Dalawang Kasarian"	
2015–2016	MariMar	Antonia Santibañez	Support role	
2016	Poor Señorita	Vanessa	Guest role	
2017	Legally Blind	Charina "Charie" Evangelista	Support role	
2017	Daig Kayo ng Lola Ko	Anastasia	Episode: "Cinderella"	
2018	Contessa	Duquessa Daniella "Dani" Imperial	Support role	
2018	Where Stars Land	Mari	Episode 7–8	
2019	Hiram na Anak	Odessa "Dessa" Saint-Alvarez	Supporting role	
2019	Pepito Manaloto	Mish Soriano	Episode: "LOL"	
2021	Stories From The Heart: Never Say Goodbye	Victoria Flores	Main role	
2022	Bolera	Young Tessa Fajardo	Guest role	

=== Film ===
Year	Title	Role	Notes	Source
2007	One More Chance	Bernice		
2010	Sa 'yo Lamang	Lorraine		
2011	Zombadings 1: Patayin sa Shokot si Remington	Hannah		
2012	Tahanan	Samantha Benitez		
2012	Catnip	Liv		
2013	Puti	Ana		
2014	Overtime	Jody Amistoso		
2015	Alexa	Alexa		
