= Liezl Martinez =

Filipino actress (1967–2015)

Liezl De Villa
- Born: Anna Lisa Muhlach Sumilang; March 27, 1967; Manila, Philippines
- Died: March 14, 2015 (aged 47); Pasig, Metro Manila, Philippines
- Other names: Anna-Lisa, Liezl
- Occupations: Actress, child star
- Years active: 1968–2015
- Spouse: Albert Martinez (m. 1985)
- Children: 3, including Alfonso Martinez
- Parent(s): Amalia Muhlach (mother); Ricardo Sumilang (father)
- Relatives: Nino Muhlach (cousin); AJ Muhlach (cousin); Aga Muhlach (cousin); Alonzo Muhlach (nephew); William Martinez (brother-in-law)

Anna Lisa Muhlach Sumilang-Martinez (March 27, 1967 – March 14, 2015), also known as Liezl Martinez, was a Filipino actress. She was also known by her other screen name Anna-Lisa.

== Early life ==
She was born on March 27, 1967, to actors Romeo Vasquez (1939–2017) and Amalia Fuentes (1940–2019) in Manila, Philippines.

== Personal life ==
Martinez was married to Filipino actor and director Albert Martinez. They eloped in Las Vegas in 1985. They had three children, including Alfonso Martinez.

== Health and death ==
Martinez was diagnosed with breast cancer in 2008 following a breast examination ordered by Dr. Judy Fuentes, her obstetrician-gynecologist at The Medical City Ortigas. Liezl made a statement that she did not have any symptoms but that since her doctor said women aged 40 and above should undergo breast examinations yearly, she underwent the test.

Martinez had just recovered and "regained her crowning glory" when, in July 2011, she had had a persistent cough. She consulted with Dr. Liza Garcia, her pulmonologist at The Medical City Ortigas, who ordered some tests that later showed that she had fluid in her lungs. When the fluids were drained from her lungs, the diagnosis confirmed that Liezl's cancer had recurred and had metastasized to her left lung; the cancer was already in its Stage 4. “I thought I was okay and then it happened. It was much more painful and harder to accept,” Liezl said in an interview.

Throughout her battle with cancer, Liezl had the support of her husband, Albert. In a Philippine Daily Inquirer report in 2012, Albert stated that he would make sure she lived “as normal a life as possible.”

On March 14, 2015, Martinez peacefully died at 6:15 a.m. surrounded by her family, according to her mother Amalia Fuentes. She was 47.

== Legacy ==
Asked why she included Martinez among her first batch of members of the Movie and Television Review and Classification Board (MTRCB), its former chairman and Senator Grace Poe said: “She was a good mother and wife, had a firm grasp of what is right or wrong, with a strong connection and concern for the movie and TV industries, balanced by her compassion for the welfare of children.”

With the MTRCB, Liezl took charge of the “Matalinong Panonood” sorties to various parts of the country.

Liezl was designated to oversee physical improvements in the MTRCB Building, a task she relished and was meticulous to the detail.

The building's fourth floor board room was later named the Liezl S. Martinez Hall. Christening rights were held on the March 25, 2015, two days before what would have been her 48th birthday; in attendance were her husband, Albert; children Alfonso, Alyanna and Alissa; and Liezl's father, Romeo Vasquez; the MTRCB's chairman, Eugenio “Toto” Villareal; board members; and Liezl's office staff who loved their "Ma’am Liezl".

== Filmography ==
=== Film ===
Year	Title	Role
1968	Sa Manlulupig Di Ka Pasisiil	
1968	Good Morning Titser	
1971	Portrait of An Angel	
1971	Europe Here We Come	
1971	Liezl and the 7 Hoods	
1972	Anghel na Pag-ibig	
1972	Poor Little Rich Girl	
1972	Pinokyo en Little Snow White	
1973	Sa Aming Muling Pagkikita	
1973	Nagbalik na Lumipas	
1974	Durugin Ang Mga Diyablo Sa Punta Fuego	
1984	Ibulong Mo Sa Puso	
1994	Lipa Arandia Massacre: Lord, Deliver Us From Evil	Cindy
2010	Rosario	Mother Superior

=== Television ===
Year	Title	Role
1993–1995	SST: Salo-Salo Together	Host
