= Romeo Vasquez =

Filipino actor (1939–2017)

- Vasquez in 1957
- Born: Roberto Alandy Sumilang; April 9, 1939; Tayabas, Tayabas (now Quezon), Commonwealth of the Philippines
- Died: May 2, 2017 (aged 78); Los Angeles, California, U.S.
- Resting place: Forest Lawn
- Occupation: Actor
- Years active: 1956–2009
- Spouse: Amalia Fuentes (m. 1965; div. 1969)
- Children: 3, including Liezl Sumilang-Martinez

Romeo Vasquez (born Roberto Alandy Sumilang; April 9, 1939 – May 2, 2017), was a Filipino actor whose career spanned over four decades. He was one of Philippine cinema's definitive leading men from 1950s to 1970s. Vasquez was awarded Best Actor at the Asian Film Festival for his performance in Ako ang Maysala! (1958), in addition to nominations for five FAMAS Awards.

== Career ==
Vasquez was discovered by director Armando Garces who saw him while playing basketball in San Juan, Metro Manila, brought him to Sampaguita Pictures. He did several bit roles before his big break.

He was introduced in Miss Tilapia (1956) starring Gloria Romero and Susan Roces. He played younger brother to Amalia Fuentes in Lydia (1956). He starred in Pretty Boy (1957) with Amalia Fuentes, Sino ang Maysala? (1957) with Susan Roces, and Kilabot sa Makiling (1959) with Liberty Ilagan.

Vasquez played the son and Fred Montilla as the father in heavy drama Isinakdal Ko ang Aking Ama (1960). He did Dugo sa Aking Kamay (1961) with Barbara Perez, and Maruja (1967), an immortal love story by Mars Ravelo, starring Susan Roces.

He did the films Angelo (1970) with Amalia Fuentes, Nag-aapoy Na Damdamin (1976) with Vilma Santos, Bawal Na Pag-ibig (1977) with Alma Moreno, Dalawang Pugad, Isang Ibon (1977) with Vilma Santos, Diego Rival (1977) with Elizabeth Oropesa and Vivian Velez, Bakit Kailangan Kita? (1978) with Vilma Santos, and Gusto Kita, Mahal Mo Siya (1979) with Vilma Santos and Christopher de Leon.

In 1993, Vasquez returned to the Philippines after living for some time in Los Angeles in the United States. He ran for vice governor of Quezon during the 1995 elections, but he did not win.

He was cast as Col. Castillo in Urban Rangers (1995) with Raymart Santiago.

== Personal life ==
Romeo Vasquez was born in Tayabas, Quezon, and was the former husband of actress Amalia Fuentes. He was the father of actress Liezl (late wife of actor Albert Martinez). He had two other children in previous marriages: Luigi Sumilang (c. 1960) and Karla Sumilang (c. 1965).

== Death ==
Romeo Vasquez died of stroke on May 2, 2017, at the age of 78.

== Selected filmography ==
=== Film ===
- Miss Tilapia (1956)
- Lydia (1956)
- Sino ang Maysala? (1957)
- Pretty Boy (1957)
- Bobby (1958)
- Ako ang Maysala! (1958)
- Mga Reyna ng Vicks (1958)
- Pitong Pagsisisi (1959)
- Kahapon Lamang (1959)
- Isinakdal Ko ang Aking Ama (1960)
- Amy, Susie & Tessie (1960)
- Habagat Sa Tag-araw (1961)
- Suicide Commandoes (1962)
- Limang Kidlat (1963)
- Daigdig ng Matatapang (1964)
- Isinulat sa Dugo (1965)
- Ang Nasasakdal! (1966)
- Maruja (1967)
- Gaano Kita Kamahal? (1968)
- Rowena (1969)
- Angelo (1970)
- Sa Aming Muling Pagkikita (1973)
- Nag-aapoy Na Damdamin (1976)
- Dalawang Pugad, Isang Ibon (1977)
- Bakit Kailangan Kita? (1978)
- Pag-ibig Ko sa Iyo (1978)
- Swing It… Baby! (1979)
- Ayaw Kong Maging Kerida (1983)
- Nang Masugatan ang Gabi (1984)
- Hello Lover, Goodbye Friend (1985)
- The Vizconde Massacre (God, Help Us!) (1993)
- The Untold Story: Vizconde Massacre II (May The Lord Be With Us!) (1994)
- The Cecilia Masagca Story: Antipolo Massacre (Jesus Save Us!) (1994)
- Urban Rangers (1995)
- Reputasyon (1997)

=== Television ===
- Di Ba't Ikaw (1999) (final role)

== Awards and nominations ==
- 1958 Won Asia's Best Actor Ako ang Maysala! (1958)
- 1958 Won Golden Harvest Award Best Actor Ako ang Maysala! (1958)
- 1958 Nominated FAMAS Award Best Supporting Actor Sino ang Maysala? (1957)
- 1959 Nominated FAMAS Award Best Actor Bobby (1958)
- 1963 Nominated FAMAS Award Best Actor Pitong Kabanalan ng Isang Makasalanan (1962)
- 1966 Nominated FAMAS Award Best Actor Sapagkat Ikaw Ay Akin (1965)
- 1968 Nominated FAMAS Award Best Actor Maruja (1967)
- 2006 Won Eastwood City Walk Of Fame Philippines Celebrity Inductee Winner
