= Rodora =

- Directed by: Rosa Mia
- Starring: Paraluman; Juancho Gutierrez; Amalia Fuentes
- Distributed by: Sampaguita Pictures
- Release date: 1956
- Country: Philippines
- Language: Tagalog / Filipino

Rodora is a 1956 movie from Sampaguita Pictures about a man (Juancho Gutierrez) who falls in love with a girl (Amalia Fuentes).
