= Dino Imperial =

Filipino actor and model (born 1988)

- Born: Dino Ricardo Kilates; April 9, 1988 (age 38)
- Other names: DZ SVG; M.C. DZ; Mc Dizzy
- Occupations: Actor; model; M.C.
- Years active: 2005–present
- Agent(s): Star Magic (2005–2010); Viva Artist Agency (since 2010)
- Musical career
- Genres: Pinoy hip hop

Dino Ricardo Kilates (born April 9, 1988), known professionally as Dino Imperial, is a Filipino actor. In 2023, he played the role of "JP" in the action-drama series FPJ's Batang Quiapo. He also works in the nightlife industry as Club MC, commercial model, and radio disk jockey. He was a member of ABS-CBN's circle of homegrown talents named Star Magic, ABS-CBN's Talent Management & Development Center and starred in Star Magic Presents: Abt Ur Luv.

== Career ==
In 2010, Imperial left Star Magic and joined Viva Artists Agency. Enrique Gil took over his spot in Star Magic's Gigger Boys segment in ASAP XV.

In his radio career, Imperial currently works with radio station Wave 89.1. In music, he works under his alias DZ SVG (pronounced Dizzy Savage), and is part of the underground hip-hop collective Bawal Clan.

== Filmography ==
=== Film ===
| Year | Title | Role | Ref. |
|---|---|---|---|
| 2006 | Shake, Rattle & Roll 8 | Rocky | |
| 2011 | Who's That Girl? | Kyle Pedroza | |
| 2011 | Catch Me, I'm in Love | Rojie | |

=== Television ===
| Year | Title | Role | Ref. |
|---|---|---|---|
| 2005–2010; 2023–present | ASAP XP | Host / Performer | |
| 2006 | Komiks Presents: Bampy | | |
| 2006–2007 | Star Magic Presents: Abt Ur Luv | Bill Pagkalinawan | |
| 2007 | Your Song Presents: Tulak ng Bibig | Carl | |
| 2007 | Love Spell Presents: Ellay Enchanted | | |
| 2007–2008 | Prinsesa ng Banyera | Habagat | |
| 2007–2008 | Star Magic Presents: Abt Ur Luv, Ur Lyf 2 | Bill Pagkalinawan | |
| 2008 | Star Magic Presents: Astigs in Haay...School Lyf | Andoy | |
| 2008 | Star Magic Presents: Astigs in Luvin' Lyf | Jethro | |
| 2008 | Volta | Salty/220 | |
| 2008 | Your Song Presents: Impossible | Jonathan "Onat" | |
| 2009 | Your Song Presents: Boystown | Chad | |
| 2009 | Maynila | Ariel | |
| 2009 | Maynila | Mike | |
| 2009 | Katorse | Dilbert | |
| 2009 | George and Cecil | Jun | |
| 2010 | Precious Hearts Romances Presents: Kristine | Young Marco de Silva | |
| 2010 | Imortal | Jethro Kabigting | |
| 2011 | Maynila: Hula Ka, Babe | Paco | |
| 2011 | Pinoy Big Brother Unlimited: The Joseph Biggel Story | Joseph Biggel | |
| 2011 | Minsan Lang Kita Iibigin | Rico | |
| 2011 | Bagets: Just Got Lucky | Dustin | |
| 2012 | Walang Hanggan | Jack | |
| 2012 | Maynila: Love Best Policy | Carlo | |
| 2012 | Luna Blanca | Vince | |
| 2017–2018 | La Luna Sangre | Jethro Kabigting | |
| 2018 | Ipaglaban Mo: Bayad | Roger Cali | |
| 2018 | Maalaala Mo Kaya: Eskoba | Tot | |
| 2019 | Maalaala Mo Kaya: Tubig | Saudi Police | |
| 2023 | FPJ's Batang Quiapo | JP Reyes | |
| 2025 | Incognito | Francis Escalera / Diamond | |
| 2026 | Blood vs Duty | SPO2 Russel Contreras | |

== Discography ==
=== As DZ SVG ===
Studio albums

List of studio albums, with selected details
| Title | Details |
|---|---|
| Burnt Cookie | Released: September 9, 2018 (PHL); Label: Self-released; Formats: Digital download, streaming |
