= Megan Young =

Filipino actress

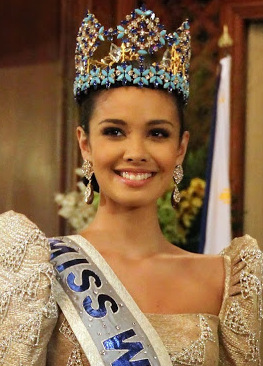
- Young in 2013
- Born: Megan Lynne Talde Young; February 27, 1990 (age 36); Alexandria, Virginia, U.S.
- Citizenship: United States; Philippines
- Education: Trinity University of Asia; De La Salle–College of Saint Benilde (BA)
- Occupations: Actress; television host; model; beauty queen; video jockey
- Height: 1.73 m (5 ft 8 in)
- Spouse: Mikael Daez (m. 2020)
- Children: 1
- Beauty pageant titleholder
- Title: Miss World Philippines 2013; Miss World 2013
- Years active: 2004–present
- Hair color: Dark brown
- Eye color: Brown
- Major competitions: Miss World Philippines 2013 (Winner); Miss World 2013 (Winner) (Top Model) (Miss World Asia)

Megan Lynne Talde Young-Daez (Tagalog: [mˈɛɡən jˈaŋ dˈɑːʔˈez]; née Young; born February 27, 1990) is a Filipino actress, model, and beauty queen who won Miss World 2013. She is the first delegate from the Philippines and Southeast Asia to win Miss World.

She was previously crowned Miss World Philippines 2013. Young started her entertainment career as a contestant on the reality television show StarStruck (2004–2005).

== Early life and education ==
Megan Lynne Talde Young was born on February 27, 1990, in Alexandria, Virginia to Filipino and American parents Victoria Talde from Pandan, Antique, and Calvin Cole Young III from Richmond.

Young's family moved to Castillejos, Zambales when she was 10. She received secondary education at the Regional Science High School III within the Subic Bay Freeport Zone in Olongapo City from 2002 to 2005, before moving to Metro Manila to pursue her acting career. Young holds a degree in filmmaking from the De La Salle-College of Saint Benilde.

== Career ==
=== 2004–07: Early acting career in GMA ===
Young entered the entertainment industry by joining the second season of the talent reality search StarStruck, where she placed in the top six. Her acting debut in GMA was in Love to Love Presents: Love Ko Urok, where she played the role of Meg. She then played the role of Anna in Asian Treasures and the role of a fairy in Mga Kuwento ni Lola Basyang.

=== 2007–15: Transfer to ABS-CBN and TV5 ===
After more than two years with GMA Artist Center, she moved to ABS-CBN following her sister, Lauren Young. She is the first StarStruck alumna to transfer to GMA's rival station, ABS-CBN.

Young first appeared in ABS-CBN in the youth oriented show "Star Magic Presents" Astigs and Abt Ur Luv. She also played the role of Shane in Kokey, opposite Zanjoe Marudo. She became well known when she appeared as one of the celebrity housemates in Pinoy Big Brother: Celebrity Edition 2, dubbed as "The Princess of Charm". After PBB, she portrayed the villain Marcela in ABS-CBN's remake of I Love Betty La Fea opposite John Lloyd Cruz. In 2009, she was one of four personalities introduced as video jockeys for the relaunching of Channel [V] Philippines. Young also became an occasional host in several shows in Studio 23. In 2012, Young had her big break as a lead actress in Hiyas, reuniting with Zanjoe Marudo as her love interest. In 2013, she switched to TV5 but still made appearances in the Kapamilya network.

Aside from television, Young has also starred in a few films, one of which was The Reunion, where she played Toyang, opposite Xian Lim. Young was nominated as Outstanding Guest Star on Dahsyatnya Awards 2014.

=== 2015–present: Return to GMA Network ===
In March 2015, Young returned to GMA Network after four years of exclusive contract with ABS-CBN. Her comeback project in the Kapuso Network is the most anticipated second adaptation of the hit Mexicanovela MariMar where she plays the title role. She is paired with Tom Rodriguez who plays the role of her love interest Sergio. Her sister Lauren Young is also part of the show and plays the role of MariMar's main antagonist Antonia. This marks their second project together after Star Magic Presents: Abt Ur Luv Ur Lyf 2.

Young is also one of the hosts in the sixth edition of the reality talent search Starstruck which launched her career as an artist. She's working alongside Dingdong Dantes as main host, and her co-Starstruck alumni Mark Herras, Rocco Nacino, Miguel Tanfelix, and Kris Bernal, who serve as journey hosts. The show premiered on September 7, 2015.

== Pageantry ==
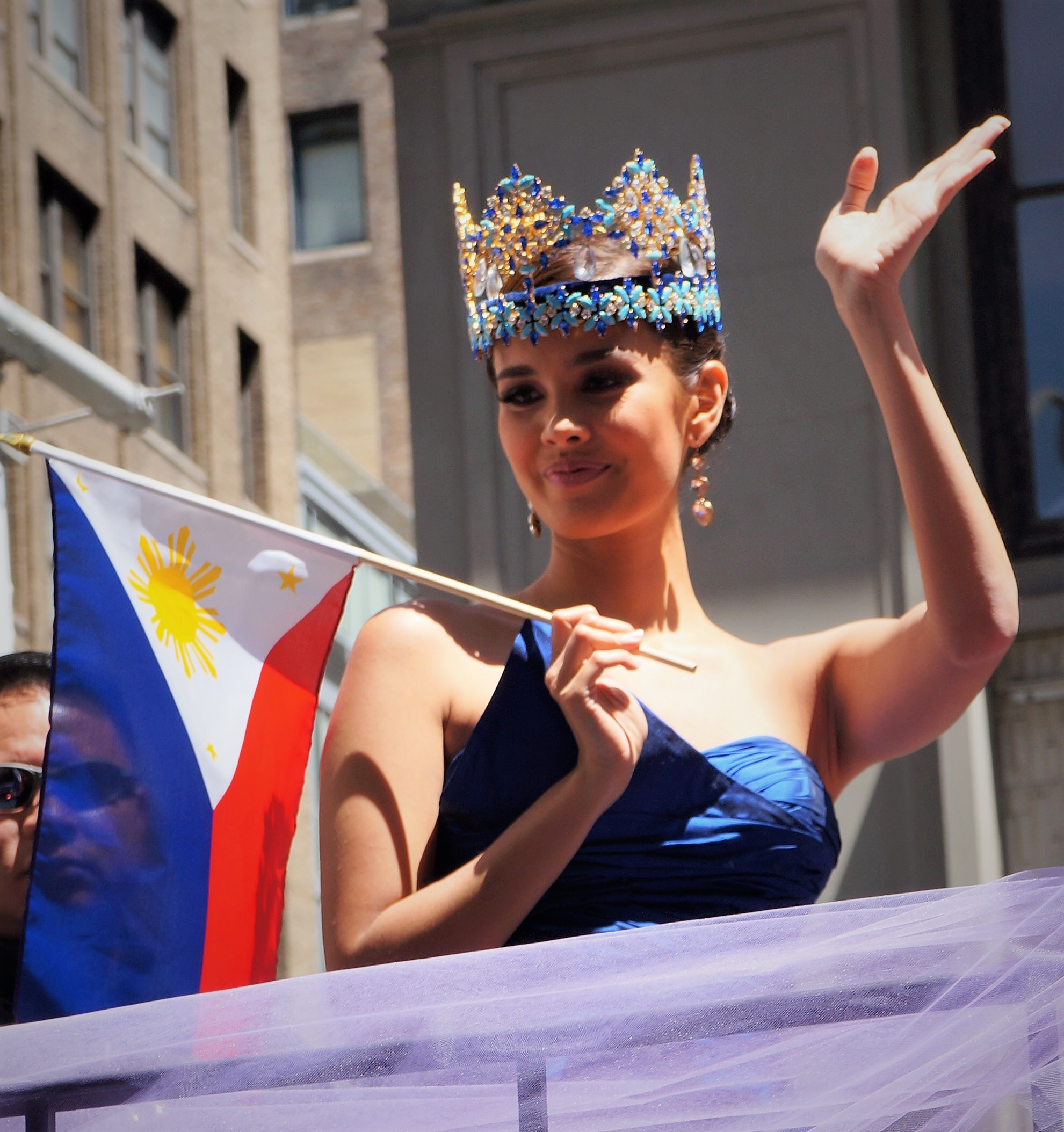
Young at the 2014 New York Philippines Independence Day Parade

=== Miss World Philippines 2013 ===
She was crowned Miss World Philippines 2013 during the pageant coronation night on August 18, 2013. She also bagged the Best in Fashion Runway, Miss Sports by Fila, Miss Reducin, Miss Olay, Miss Laguna, Miss Figlia and Miss Bench Body awards.

On October 12, 2014, Young crowned Valerie Weigmann as her successor at the Miss World Philippines 2014 pageant held at the Mall of Asia Arena in Pasay, Philippines.

=== Miss World 2013 ===
Young was crowned as Miss World 2013 in Bali, Indonesia, making her the first Filipina to win the title of Miss World since its creation in 1951. During the preliminaries, she also won the "Top Model" competition, placed second in the "People's Champion," placed fourth in the "Multimedia Challenge" and fifth in the "Beach Beauty" contest.

In the final question and answer portion, the contestants in the Top 6 were asked the same question: "Why should you be the next Miss World?" and Young replied:

I treasure a core value of humanity and that guides people why they act the way they do. I will use this to show other people how they can understand each other. … as one, we can help society.

Young also received the Continental Queen of Beauty title as Miss World Asia 2013, the highest ranked contestant in the Asian region and was featured in the Dances of the World segment of the final show.

In March 2014, the Philippine Postal Corporation (PhilPost) officially launched a limited-edition postage stamp honoring Megan Young’s victory as Miss World 2013, the first Miss World title won by the Philippines. The stamp, unveiled at the PhilPost Central Office in Manila, featured embossed full-color images from Young’s coronation and gold lettering, produced at 80,000 copies.

As Miss World 2013, Young traveled to and visited several countries and territories, including the United Kingdom, United States, Haiti, Indonesia, Barbados, Colombia, Russia, India, Vietnam, Ukraine, Timor-Leste, Madagascar, Puerto Rico, the Dominican Republic, Chile, Argentina, Cuba, Peru, Paraguay, Nicaragua, Bolivia, Kazakhstan, Tajikistan, China, South Korea, Japan, and her home country of the Philippines. Young crowned Rolene Strauss as her successor at the Miss World 2014 pageant held at the ExCeL London in London, United Kingdom on December 14, 2014.

=== Subsequent events ===
Young co-hosted the Miss World 2023 pageant held in Mumbai, India on March 9, 2024, which was won by Krystyna Pyszková of the Czech Republic. During the final round, Young was seen fixing the hair of Miss Botswana, Lesego Chombo, prompting her to apologize publicly after she was accused of invading personal space and cultural insensitivity.

== Personal life ==
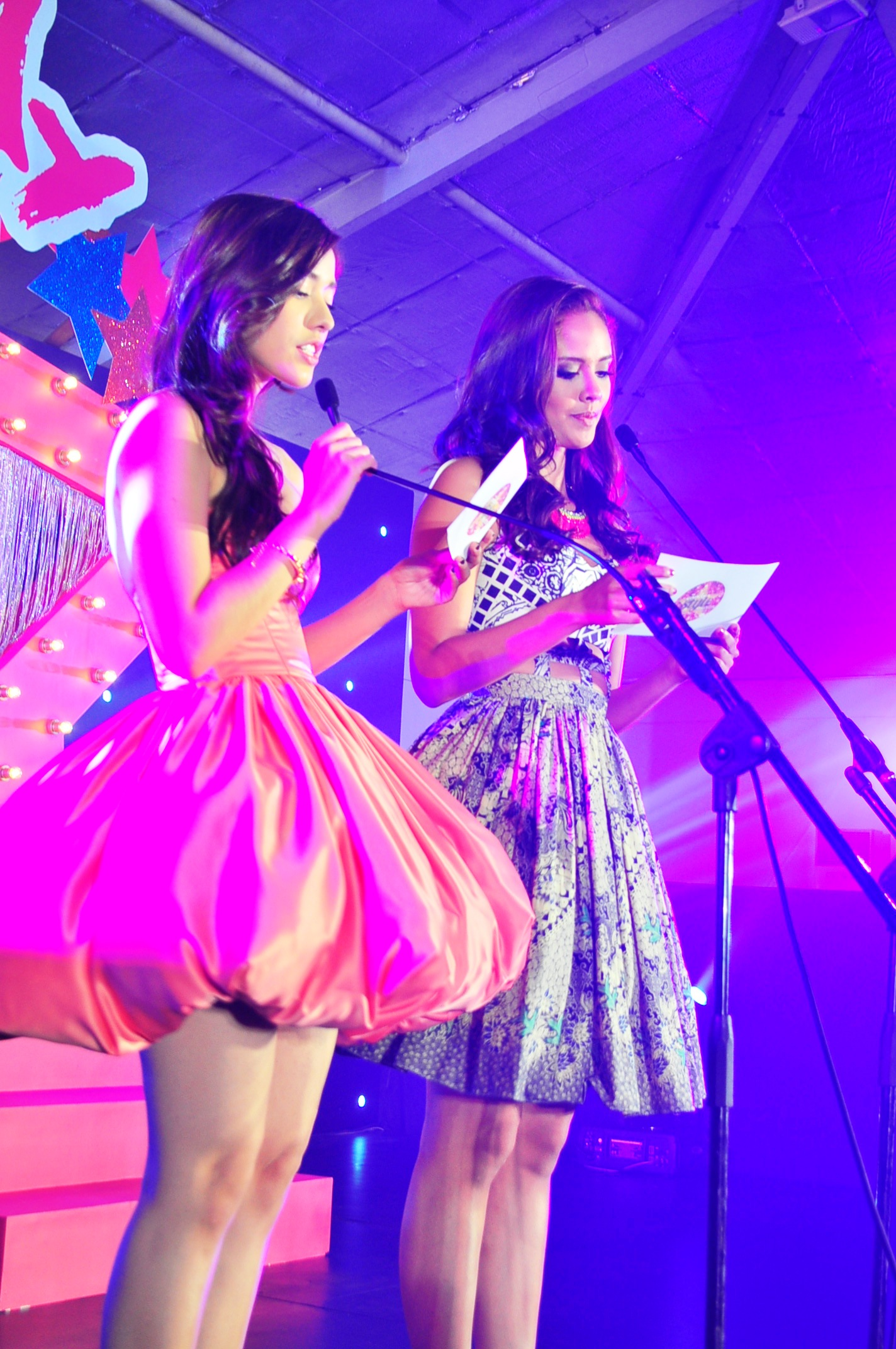
Megan Young (right) with sister Lauren Young (left), at the 2013 Candy Style awards.

Young is the elder sister of actress and model Lauren Young.

In February 2017, Mikael Daez confirmed that he had been dating Young for six years. On January 25, 2020, they announced their marriage. Their first child, a boy named León, was born in 2025.

Megan and Mikael continued their life as an actor/actress. They also posting some content/vlog about their personal life. their relationship is often appreciated by their fans for its friendly and supportive nature.

== Filmography ==
=== Film ===
Year	Title	Role	Notes	Ref
2005	Say That You Love Me	Anna		
2009	Pangarap Kong Jackpot	Eula		
2009	Shake, Rattle & Roll XI	Lucia Castiliano	Segment: "Ukay-Ukay"	
2010	Astro Mayabang			
2010	White House	Mikey Trinidad		
2010	Sigwa	Dolly	Cameo	
2010	Babe, I Love You	Gaita Veneracion Borromeo		
2011	Enteng Ng Ina Mo	Ina Azul		
2011	Won't Last A Day Without You	Melissa		
2012	The Reunion	Antonia "Tonyang" Castro		
2013	Bang Bang Alley	Abbey		
2017	Our Mighty Yaya	Monique		

=== Television ===
Year	Title	Role	Notes	Ref
2004–05	StarStruck II	Herself – Contestant		
2005	Love to Love	Meg	Episode: "Love Ko Urok"	
2005–06	Fans Kita	Herself – Host		
2007	Mga Kuwento ni Lola Basyang	Fairy	Episode: "Ang Binibining Tumalo sa Hari"	
2007	Asian Treasures	Anna		
2007	Kokey	Shane		
2007	Star Magic Presents: Astigs	Janine		
2007	Star Magic Presents: Abt Ur Luv, Ur Lyf 2	Honey		
2008–09	I Love Betty La Fea	Marcella Valencia		
2008	Pinoy Big Brother: Celebrity Edition	Herself – Contestant		
2009	Maalaala Mo Kaya	Ermie	Episode: "Bench"	
2009	Maalaala Mo Kaya	Young Etrona	Episode: "Singsing"	
2009–12	Channel V Philippines	Herself – VJ		
2010	5 Star Specials	Various		
2010	ASAP XV	Herself – Host		
2010	Rubi	Sophia Cardenas		
2010	M3: Malay Mo Ma-develop	Bea Cornejo		
2010	Girlista	Herself – Host		
2011	Us Girls	Herself – Host		
2011	It's Showtime	Herself – Judge		
2011	Precious Hearts Romances Presents: Mana Po	Winnie		
2011	ASAP Rocks	Herself – Host		
2012	Precious Hearts Romances Presents: Hiyas	Sapphire Salvador		
2012	ASAP 2012	Herself – Host		
2012–13	A Beautiful Affair	Ava Pierro		
2013	ASAP 18	Herself – Host		
2013	Misibis Bay	Lara Borromeo		
2013	Never Say Goodbye	Vera Maglungsod / Vera Pendleton		
2015	Dangwa	Jane Imperial		
2015	Vampire ang Daddy Ko	MariMar Pérez-Santibañez		
2015	StarStruck VI	Herself – Host		
2015–16	Marimar	MariMar Pérez-Santibañez / Bella Aldama		
2016	Conan, My Beautician	Ava		
2016	Alyas Robin Hood	Sarita "Sarri" Acosta		
2017	Magpakailanman	Sel		
2017	Dear Uge: Di Na 'Ko Aasa Pang Muli	Pauline		
2017	Daig Kayo ng Lola Ko	Drizella	Episode: "Cinderella"	
2018	Dear Uge: Bagong Bahay Bagong Away	Grace		
2018	The Stepdaughters	Mayumi Dela Rosa-Almeda		
2019	Dear Uge: Kapatid Ko, Karibal Ko	Norma		
2019	Hanggang sa Dulo ng Buhay Ko	Yvette "Yvie" Cardenas-Divinagracia		
2022	The Best Ka!	Herself – Host		
2022	Running Man Philippines	Guest Runner	Episode: "Mukbang Bingo Race"	
2023	Royal Blood	Diana Royales		

=== Music videos ===
Year	Song title	Artist
2007	"Nagmamahal ng Tunay"	Piolo Pascual
2012	"AMATS"	Rico Blanco

== Notes ==
Awards and achievements
Preceded by (China) Yu Wenxia	Miss World; 2013	Succeeded by (South Africa) Rolene Strauss
Preceded by (China) Yu Wenxia	Miss World Asia; 2013	Succeeded by (India) Koyal Rana
Preceded by (South Sudan) Atong Demach	Miss World Top Model; 2013	Succeeded by (Bosnia and Herzegovina) Isidora Borovčanin
Preceded by Queenierich Rehman (Las Piñas)	Miss World Philippines; 2013	Succeeded by Valerie Weigmann (Legazpi, Albay)
