= Zia Marquez =

Filipino actress

- Born: Isabelle Krizia Dayot Marquez; May 10, 1992 (age 34); Philippines
- Occupation: Actress
- Years active: 2000–present
- Father: Joey Marquez
- Relatives: Winwyn Marquez (sister); Melanie Marquez (aunt); Michelle Dee (cousin)

Izabella Krizia "Zia" Dayot Marquez (born May 10, 1992) is a Filipina actress. She is a member of ABS-CBN's elite circle of homegrown talents collectively known as Star Magic.

== Biography ==
=== Background ===
Izabella Krizia Dayot Marquez is the second daughter of actor Joey Marquez with former actress and producer Brenda del Rio. She is the sister of former child star Jowee Ann Marquez and half siblings are Jeremy Marquez and Winwyn Marquez. She is a niece of Miss International Melanie Marquez.

=== Career ===
Marquez had a taste of show business when she joined Ang TV 2 with her sister, Jowee Ann, in 2000. As a child star she has appeared in ABS-CBN shows like Maalaala Mo Kaya and Pangako Sa 'Yo.

In 2006, she was relaunched as a member of Star Magic Batch 13. Now at her teens, Marquez is more zealous than ever to carve a name in Philippine Showbiz. Aside from being an actress she has also thought of following in her aunt, Melanie Marquez's footsteps as a model and beauty queen.

== Filmography ==
Television
Year	Title	Role
2000	Ang TV 2	Herself
2000	Pangako Sa 'Yo	
2006–2007	Star Magic Presents: Abt Ur Luv	Giselle
2007–2008	Star Magic Presents: Abt Ur Luv Ur Lyf 2	Giselle
2008	Star Magic Presents: Star Magic Presents: Astigs in Luvin Lyf	Trish
2008	Maalaala Mo Kaya: Notebook	classmate
2009	Kambal sa Uma	Vira's friend
