= Victor Basa =

Filipino actor, model and host (born 1985)

- Born: Victor Emmanuel Basa; June 6, 1985 (age 40); Quezon City, Philippines
- Occupations: Model, actor, TV host, radio V.J., singer
- Years active: 2003–present
- Agents: Star Magic (2006–2011) ALV Talent Circuit; GMA Artist Center
- Height: 6 ft 2 in (1.88 m)
- Spouse: Stephanie Dan (m. 2019)
- Partner: Divine Lee (2010–2015)

Victor Emmanuel Basa (born June 6, 1985) is a Filipino model, actor, radio V.J., television host and former ex-housemate of Pinoy Big Brother: Celebrity Edition 2.

Victor is the middle child of three, with a younger brother and older sister.

== Modeling career ==
Basa began his modeling career at the age of 19, where he was discovered at the Mega Young Designer's Competition in 2004 by newspaper editor Joyce Fernandez along with fashion designer Kenneth Chua. He joined the Philippine search for the best model of the world where he was awarded best in swimwear, and then landed on a television ad for a cracker, and endorsing a clothing brand, became a television actor then the Cosmopolitan Bachelor's Bash.

In 2005, Basa gained commercial visibility in the Philippines when he became a model for clothing retailer Penshoppe. In 2006, Basa was invited to sign on with Star Magic, the talent management agency affiliated with the ABS-CBN network in the Philippines.

== Television career ==
Soon after signing with Star Magic, Basa quickly began to appear in a number of shows on the ABS-CBN network. He became a regular host of the weekly Sunday variety show ASAP; appeared in his first recurring primetime supporting role in the soap opera Crazy for You as a love interest of the leading lady portrayed by Toni Gonzaga; and landed supporting roles in two single-episode stories in Star Magic Presents.

In 2006, Basa was cast as a regular cast member of Abt Ur Luv, a youth-oriented drama series, as Carla Humphries's love interest. Basa is a member of ABS-CBN's circle of homegrown talents named Star Magic.

In 2007, the new MTV Philippines signed on Basa as one of the channel's new VJs. He currently hosts MTV Timeout.

He was one of the Celebrity Housemates in Pinoy Big Brother: Celebrity Edition 2.

Basa is currently a contract artist of the GMA Network. Basa played a role in the hit drama series My Husband's Lover.

== Personal life ==
In 2010, he dated TV host and real estate heiress Divine Lee. They were together for more than 4 years until their break-up in April 2015.

Basa is featured in The 700 Club Asia, where he shared his changed life. He had a realization when he had a friend who committed suicide.

He proposed to his non-showbiz girlfriend Stephanie Dan in September 2019 and got married on November 10 of the same year.

== Filmography ==
=== Television series ===
Year	Title	Role	Notes	Ref.
2006	Crazy for You	Errol		
2006	Star Magic Presents: Deal or No Deal	Lenard		
2006	Star Magic Presents: The Game of Love	Boggs		
2006–2007	Star Magic Presents: Abt Ur Luv	Lester "Stick" Mangubat		
2007–2008	Star Magic Presents: Abt Ur Luv:Ur Lyf 2	Lester "Stick" Mangubat		
2007	Walang Kapalit	Miguel		
2008	Your Song: Without You	John		
2008	Your Song: Kapag Ako Ay Nagmahal	Serge		
2008	I Am KC: Love 2 Dance	—	Cameo role	
2009	May Bukas Pa	Father John Delgado		
2010	Precious Hearts Romances Presents: You're Mine, Only Mine	Antonio		
2010	Kung Tayo'y Magkakalayo	Hero		
2010	MooMoo and Me	Instructor		
2011	Mga Nagbabagang Bulaklak	Marco Montemayor		
2012	Cielo de Angelina	Dr. Frank		
2013	My Husband's Lover	David		
2014	Ang Dalawang Mrs. Real	Gico		
2015	Maynila: Twist of Fate	Francis/Cis		
2015	Magpakailanman: Misis Vs Beki	Jay		
2015	Buena Familia	Santiago "Yago" Perez		
2022	Mano Po Legacy: The Family Fortune	Allan		
2025	Incognito			

=== Variety shows ===
Year	Title	Notes	Ref.
2006	ASAP '08	Host, performer	
2007	MTV Timeout	VJ	
2007	Pinoy Big Brother: Celebrity Edition 2	Housemate	
2007	Stars on Ice	Contestant	
2008	Shall We Dance: Search for the Dance Superstar	Host	
2009	Pilipinas, Game KNB?	Contestant	
2009	Showtime	Judge	
2013	Appetite Wars	Host	
2017	The 700 Club Asia	Himself	
2025	Rated Korina	Himself	

=== Film ===
- Maling Akala (2008)
- Xenoa 2: Clash of the Bloods (2008)
- Romeo at Juliet (2010)
- Pak! Pak! My Dr. Kwak! (2011)
- D' Kilabots Pogi Brothers Weh?! (2012)

== Music videos appearances ==
- Penge Naman Ako Nyan by Itchiworms (2008)
- Kasi Naman by Nikki Gil from the Hotsilog Album (2006)
- Abot Kamay by Orange and Lemons (2005)

== Modeling/ Print ==
- Generation Pink Magazine (August 2006 Cover)
- Cosmopolitan Magazine 2006 Centerfold Bachelors
