= Albert Martinez =

Filipino actor

- Born: Alberto Pineda Martinez; April 19, 1961 (age 65); Manila, Philippines
- Occupations: Actor, director, producer
- Years active: 1980–present
- Spouse: Liezl Sumilang (m. 1985; died 2015)
- Children: 3, including Alfonso
- Relatives: William Martinez (brother)

Alberto Pineda Martinez (born April 19, 1961) is a Filipino actor, producer, and director. Dubbed as the "King of Philippine Teleseryes", he has since established himself as one of the most omnipresent figures in Philippine television and cinema. He is best known for his performances in acclaimed films such as Rosario (2010), Rizal in Dapitan (1997), Segurista (1996) and Sidhi (1999), as well as in multiple hit television series like Ang Probinsyano (2015), Kadenang Ginto (2018), Juan dela Cruz (2013), The General's Daughter (2019), and Batang Quiapo (2025).

With a career spanning four decades in the showbusiness, Martinez made his screen debut in 1980 and has since starred in over 60 television series and movies. He has won 2 FAMAS Awards for 'Best Actor' & 'Best Director', 2 Gawad Urian Awards and several nominations from the Bogota Film Festival and at the Shanghai International Film Festival.

== Early life ==
Alberto Pineda Martinez was born in Manila on April 19, 1961, to Bert Martinez, and Margarita Pineda.

== Career ==
Martinez began his acting career in 1979 when a talent agency hired him for a television ad. At the time, he was just a personal assistant for his younger brother William, who was an actor. Soon after, he became a film extra in the 1981 film Totoo Ba Ang Chismis? followed by a bigger role in the film Blue Jeans. He took his first teleserye role as Glenn in the 1980 series Anna Liza on GMA Network. Martinez's character, Glenn was the suitor of the titular protagonist, Anna Liza which was portrayed by Julie Vega. The show lasted until Vega's death in 1985. He then made his ABS-CBN debut in the 1993 sitcom Oki Doki Doc.

Martinez cites actor John Travolta's acting style as his basis on his own film roles. He describes Travolta as having a tongue-in-cheek style in acting as characterized in his roles in Face/Off, Broken Arrow and Battlefield Earth. Martinez praised Travolta for making his roles "shine" on the aforementioned films despite not portraying "natural characters". He also cited Christopher de Leon as his idol since he started his career in film acting.

In 1992, after taking a break from acting to raise his two children with Anna Lissa "Liezl" Sumilang in the United States, Martinez starred in the romantic drama film Yakapin Mo Akong Muli, which was a box office bomb. He followed that up with Kahit May Mahal Ka Ng Iba a year later, which was not well received. As a result, he was only not able to complete the three-picture deal he signed with Regal Films, and went back to being a film extra.

Martinez got back into significant roles thanks to performances in GMA teleseryes and the 1994 film Pangako ng Kahapon, which earned him a FAMAS Award for Best Supporting Actor. After that he got to work with Nora Aunor in two films: Muling Umawit ang Puso and Sidhi. He also won several Best Supporting Actor awards from the Gawad Urian and the Filipino Academy of Movie Arts and Sciences (FAMAS) for his role in the film Dead Sure. His role in Dead Sure was the first time he played a villain role.

In the television series Ikaw Lang ang Mamahalin, he portrayed Ferdinand Fuentebuella who marries a woman from a rich family to save the wealth of his own family. On the eve of Martinez's character's wedding, Fuentebuella had a one-night stand with a prostitute (portrayed by Gina Alajar and gets her pregnant. Fuentebuella is reunited with his daughter, Catherine (portrayed by Angelika dela Cruz) five years later but again gets separated from each other. Throughout the series Fuentebuella is determined to reunite again with his daughter as his loveless marriage deteriorates. This role of a sympathetic character was deemed a deviation from Martinez's usual portrayal of hateful characters in films. Commenting on his role after being asked how does he chooses his role, Martinez says that the audience views the characters as role models which they would like to emulate. He says that he tries to incorporate positive values in his role yet he makes sure that the character he portrays remains flawed adding that he is "always looking for a dark twist".

Martinez starred as a downtrodden husband in the 2003 film Magnífico. He then starred in the television series, Sa Piling Mo, together with Judy Ann Santos and Piolo Pascual which was shown on ABS-CBN. He also worked on the fantaserye Komiks Presents: Da Adventures of Pedro Penduko and the teleserye Maria Flordeluna in 2007 as the role of Gen. Leo Alicante. From 2009 to 2010, he worked on the teleserye May Bukas Pa, in the role of the antagonist turned protagonist Mayor Enrique Rodrigo. He played the role of Frank Crisanto on the teleserye Kung Tayo'y Magkakalayo, alongside Kris Aquino, Kim Chiu, Gina Pareño, Coco Martin, and Gerald Anderson.

Martinez then directed his first film Rosario which was shown at the 2010 Metro Manila Film Festival. Although many praised his direction, he did not receive a directing nomination.

Martinez was part of cast for the 2012 film, Born to Love You. His next major appearance in a feature film would be in the 2021 adult drama film The Housemaid, although he also figured in a special role in Revirginized which starred Sharon Cuneta.

In 2021, he returns to GMA-7 as part of Las Hermanas. He also played the role of Dr. Richard Smith in Voltes V: Legacy.

Martinez returned again to ABS-CBN in a villain role in The Iron Heart as Engr. Priam dela Torre, the leader of the Tatsulok syndicate and the biological father of the protagonist, Apollo, played by Richard Gutierrez. After The Iron Heart, he appeared as one of the main casts of Lavender Fields in 2024. As of 2025, he portrays Mayor Roberto Guerrero in FPJ's Batang Quiapo.

== Personal life ==
His father, Bert Martínez, was a character actor during the 1960s.

Albert was married to Liezl Sumilang from 1985, until her death in 2015. In the late 1980s, the couple owned up to 46 massage therapy clinics throughout California in the United States. They had three children: actor Alfonso Martinez, Alyanna Martinez, Alissa Martinez. He now has three grandchildren.

Martinez owns a large car collection, which includes a 1968 Mercury Cougar he restored for his late wife, Liezl. Sometimes he would go off-roading with his cars in a property he owns in Tanay, Rizal.

== Filmography ==
=== Film ===
Year	Title	Role
1981	Blue Jeans	
1981	Totoo Ba ang Tsismis	
1981	Bata Pa si Sabel	Candido
1981	Bakit Ba Ganyan?	Albert
1982	First Kiss, First Love	
1982	Ito Ba ang Ating Mga Anak?	
1982	Mother Dear	Anjo
1982	No Other Love	
1982	Diary of Cristina Gaston	Alberto
1982	Story of Three Loves	Bernie
1982	Santa Claus Is Coming to Town	
1983	Exploitation	
1983	Ang Boyfriend Kong Kano	
1983	Mortal Sin	
1983	Summer Holiday	
1983	Daddy Knows Best	
1984	Where Love Has Gone	Aldo Asuncion
1984	Daddy's Little Darlings	
1984	Teenage Marriage	
1985	Lilac, Bulaklak sa Magdamag	
1985	Pahiram ng Ligaya	
1992	Yakapin Mo Akong Muli	Abel Lalugan
1993	Kahit May Mahal Ka Ng Iba	Ramon
1994	Pangako ng Kahapon	Governor Nicanor Romero
1994	Talahib at Rosas	Mayor Jake Jalandoni
1995	Minsan Pa: Kahit Konting Pagtingin 2	Benny De Guzman
1995	The Grepor Butch Belgica Story	Ruben Umali
1995	Muling Umawit ang Puso	Miguel
1996	Dyesebel	Gildo
1996	Maruja	Nanding
1996	Segurista	Jake
1996	Mumbaki	Carlos Bakayawan
1996	Gloria, Gloria Labandera	
1997	Nang Iniwan Mo Ako	Anton Marasigan
1997	Rizal sa Dapitan	José Rizal
1997	Bridesmaids	
1997	Buhay Mo'y Buhay Ko Rin	Anton Marasigan
1997	Roberta	Domingo Robles
1998	Pusong Mamon	Ron
1998	Bata, Bata... Pa'no Ka Ginawa?	Ding
1998	Tatsulok	Dave
1999	Sidhi	Miguel
1999	Peque Gallaga's Scorpio Nights 2	Andrew Sales
1999	Ekis	Gene
2000	Ika-13 Kapitulo	Caesar Nero
2000	Gusto Ko Nang Lumigaya	Orlando
2001	Abakada... Ina	Daniel
2001	Yamashita: The Tiger's Treasure	Edmond/Emong
2002	Laman	Omar
2003	Magnifico	Gerry
2003	Captain Barbell	Lagablab
2004	Astigmatism	Doc
2004	Anak Ka ng Tatay Mo	
2005	Birhen ng Manaoag	
2005	Sandalang Bahay	Cesar
2006	Numbalikdiwa	Carlos
2007	I've Fallen for You	Jonathan
2010	Rosario	Ship's captain
2012	Born to Love You	Charles Ronquillo
2016	Oro	
2017	Carlo J. Caparas' Ang Panday	Hari
2021	Revirginized	Bart
2021	The Housemaid	William
2023	Voltes V: Legacy – The Cinematic Experience	Richard Hamaguchi Smith
2023	Penduko	Gat Blanco

==== As director ====
- Rosario (2010) – MMFF Entry "59th Famas Best Director (winner)"

=== Television / Digital Series ===
Year	Title	Role	Ref
1980–1985	Anna Liza	Glenn Laxamana	(Note: In 2013–14, GMA Network's rival network, ABS-CBN, produced a television series entitled "Annaliza", a remake adaptation of the original series starring Andrea Brillantes.)
1995	Oki Doki Doc	Guest	
1994	GMA Telesine Specials: Aishite Masu		
1995	Oki Doki Doc	Albert	
1998	Nagmamahal Pa Rin Sa'Yo	Ryan	
2000–2001	May Bukas Pa	Ramon Suarez	
2001	Larawan		
2001–2002	Ikaw Lang ang Mamahalin	Ferdinand Fuentebella	
2002–2003	Habang Kapiling Ka	Alejandro Javellana	
2003–2004	Twin Hearts	Ben Katigbac	
2005	Maynila		
2006	Sa Piling Mo	Benicio Chuatoco	
2006–2007	Komiks Presents: Da Adventures of Pedro Penduko	Juan Penduko	
2006–2019; 2023–2026	ASAP	Himself / Performer and co-host	
2007	Maria Flordeluna	General Leo Alicante	(Note: Martinez starred in the remake version as Flordeluna's father, Leo.)
2007	Princess Sarah	Captain Christopher Cewe	
2008	Sineserye Presents: The Susan Roces Cinema Collection: Patayin Sa Sindak Si Barbara	Fritz Martinez (Note: Albert Martinez is portraying the remake role of Fritz Martinez in the television series starring Kris Aquino, originally portrayed by Susan Roces, who is also participating in the series.)	
2008	Palos	Salvatore	
2008	I Am KC: Yes Sir!	Angelo Martinez	
2008	Kahit Isang Saglit	Ronaldo Dimaandal	
2009–2010	May Bukas Pa	Enrique D. Rodrigo / Gonzalvo Policarpio	
2009	Maalaala Mo Kaya	Mr. Santelices	
2010	Kung Tayo'y Magkakalayo	Francisco "Frank" Crisanto	
2010	Maalaala Mo Kaya	Sonny Gonzales	
2011	Minsan Lang Kita Iibigin	young Jaime Sebastiano	
2011	Green Rose	Darren Lee	
2011	100 Days to Heaven	Tagabantay (Note: Martinez guested on 100 Days to Heaven portraying another form of Tagabantay, a man who guides Anna Manalastas to correct her wrong deeds. He is disguised as a postman and tells Anna how much time left she has.)	
2011–2012	Nasaan Ka, Elisa?	Mariano Altamira	
2012–2013	Princess and I	Anand Wangchuck	
2013	Juan dela Cruz	Samuel Alejandro	
2013	My Little Juan	Samuel Alejandro	(Note: Martinez was reprising his role as Samuel Alejandro to do a fictional character crossover to the spin-off series, My Little Juan, a child version of Juan dela Cruz.)
2014	Mars Ravelo's Dyesebel	Prinsipe Tino (Note: Albert Martinez is portraying the remake version of Tino, originally played by Wendell Ramos.)	
2014	Sana Bukas pa ang Kahapon	Leo Romero	
2015–2016	All of Me	Manuel Figueras	
2015–2016	FPJ's Ang Probinsyano	Tomas "Papa Tom" G. Tuazon	
2017	La Luna Sangre	Theodore "Prof T" Montemayor	
2017	The Good Son	Victor Buenavidez	
2018	Bagani	Agos	
2018–2019	Kadenang Ginto	Robert Mondragon	
2019	The General's Daughter	BGen. Marcial De Leon	
2021–2022	Las Hermanas	Lorenzo Illustre	
2022–2023	The Iron Heart	Engr. Priam Dela Torre	
2023	Voltes V: Legacy	Dr. Richard Hamaguchi Smith	
2024	Wonderful Pinas	himself/host	
2024–2025	Lavender Fields	Zandro Fernandez	
2025–2026	FPJ's Batang Quiapo	Mayor/Vice Mayor Roberto Guerrero	

== Awards and nominations ==
Year	Award-giving body	Category	Work	Result
1994	FAMAS Awards	Best Supporting Actor	Pangako ng Kahapon	Won
1995	Metro Manila Film Festival	Best Supporting Actor	Muling Umawit ang Puso	Won
1996	FAMAS Awards	Best Supporting Actor	Segurista	Won
1996	Gawad Urian Awards	Best Supporting Actor	Segurista	Won
1997	Manila Film Festival	Best Actor	Rizal sa Dapitan	Won
2003	Gawad Urian Awards	Best Supporting Actor	Magnifico	Won
2006	20th PMPC Star Awards for TV	Best Drama Actor	Sa Piling Mo	Nominated
2009	23rd PMPC Star Awards for TV	Best Drama Actor	May Bukas Pa	Nominated
2009	23rd PMPC Star Awards for TV	Best Single Performance by an Actor	Maalaala Mo Kaya: Bisikleta	Nominated
2011	27th PMPC Star Awards for Movies	Movie Director of the Year	Rosario	Won
2011	59th FAMAS Awards	Best Director	Rosario	Won
2013	31st Luna Awards	Best Supporting Actor	Born to Love You	Nominated
2014	Golden Screen TV Awards	Outstanding Supporting Actor in a Drama Series	Juan dela Cruz	Nominated
