= Star Magic Presents =

Philippine TV drama anthology (2006-2008)

- Official Logo for Star Magic Presents
- Genre: Teen drama, anthology
- Starring: Star Magic talents
- Country of origin: Philippines
- Original language: Filipino
- No. of episodes: 100

Production
- Running time: 1 hour

Original release
- Network: ABS-CBN
- Release: July 29, 2006 – May 10, 2008

Star Magic Presents is a Philippine television drama anthology series broadcast by ABS-CBN. It aired from July 29, 2006 to May 10, 2008. and was replaced by Wonder Mom. The show features artists from Star Magic, the talent management agency of ABS-CBN.

In an interview, Star Magic Director Johnny Manahan explained that the show's main goal was "to provide a platform whereby the agency’s fresh, yet unknown talents can shine in tandem with its more established stars. Each week, a new face is paired with an established artist, the better to remind the older stars of their responsibility to help their younger brothers and sisters."

In the Philippines, this program airs on Saturday at 10 a.m-11 a.m. in Metro Manila. (Timeslot may vary in some areas) It is also broadcast worldwide on TFC: The Filipino Channel.

== Episodes ==
=== Season 1 ===
The first five episodes feature Star Magic's top 5 female artists, followed by another 5 episodes featuring the agency's top five male artists. Another six episodes featured a selection of the agency's younger talents in single-episode stories.

The first five episodes feature the top five female artists of Star Magic, namely Kristine Hermosa, Angelica Panganiban, Bea Alonzo, Rica Peralejo, and Claudine Barretto. The next set of five episodes featured the talent agency's top five male artists, namely: Piolo Pascual, Diether Ocampo, John Lloyd Cruz, Zanjoe Marudo, and Sam Milby.

The 10th episode, Tender Loving Care, featuring Sam Milby and Denise Laurel, was re-aired on November 11, 2006.

The next set of episodes featured younger artists of the talent agency.

| No. in season | Title | Starring | Directed by | Written by | Original release date |
|---|---|---|---|---|---|
The Queens of Star Magic
| 1 | "Windows to the Heart" | Kristine Hermosa, Diether Ocampo | Jerry Lopez Sineneng | Aloy Adlawan | July 29, 2006 |
A professional photographer Susan (Kristine Hermosa) has a genetic eye disease which could have progressed into blindness had it not been for an eye transplant to which she willingly submits and fully recovers from. Dennis (Diether Ocampo) is a widower who is an artist. The two cross paths and their relationship starts with a not-so-nice nice encounter. They find out that they are actually neighbors and this starts a series of mischief and mishaps between the two. Everything changes when something happens to the urn of Diet’s late wife because of Tin’s carelessness.
| 2 | "Deal or No Deal" | Angelica Panganiban, Victor Basa | Joyce Bernal | Shaira Mella | August 5, 2006 |
Belle (Angelica Panganiban) and Lenard (Victor Basa) come from two different worlds. Belle is an orphaned girl who is down on her luck while Lenard is a sought-after model with a mother who desperately wants him to change his carefree lifestyle. By a stroke of fate, their paths cross when Lenard loses his wallet to a pickpocket. Belle witnesses the crime and retrieves the wallet. When she return the wallet to its rightful owner, Lenard’s family mistakes her for Lenard’s fiance. The two make a secret agreement to make Lenard’s family go on believing that they have a serious relationship. Will the pretense eventually lead into a real romance?
| 3 | "Miss... Mistress" | Bea Alonzo, Ryan Ramos, JB Magsaysay | Don Cuaresma | Maribel Ilag | August 12, 2006 |
Monica (Bea Alonzo) is willing to do anything for her sick sister and has taken odd jobs just to make ends meet. She needs all the help she can get. She runs into the governor (JB Magsaysay) and asks for his assistance. He is willing to help but in return, the governor wants her to be his mistress. Monica refuses but the governor is persistent and even assigns his bodyguard Alex (Ryan Ramos) to take care of her. At first they bicker but they get to know each other due to enforced company. They realize that they are compatible, and Monica falls for Alex despite the risks. What happens when the governor finds out? How will she be able to provide for her sister?
| 4 | "Love Chop" | Rica Peralejo, Rafael Rosell | Trina N. Dayrit | Delfin "Pinong" Ilao | August 19, 2006 |
Sandy (Rica Peralejo) is a beautiful martial arts instructor. One of her students is Roy (Rafael Rosell) who obviously has a crush on her. Sandy later discovers that Roy was the one who used to bully her as a kid. Roy used to make fun of Sandy by calling her ugly. She swore to herself that she would be beautiful and never be bullied again. Now, she gets her chance to get back at Roy. When Roy asks Sandy if he can court her, Sandy sets a condition. Roy can court her if he beats her in a fight. Will Roy prove himself worthy of Sandy's love? And will Sandy forget about the past and allow Roy into her life?
| 5 | "Family Pictures" | Claudine Barretto, Errol Abalayan, Angel Sy | Rowell Santiago | John Roque | August 26, 2006 |
Gwen (Claudine Barretto) is a success-driven creative director of a multi-national advertising firm. All of a sudden, she is forced to take care of Butchay (Angel Sy), her 5 year old niece, she and her brother Francis (Errol Abalayan) a 3rd year high school student while his family Gwen and Butchay, with when her younger sister and brother grabs a once in a lifetime chance to better her life abroad. Not used to the situation, Gwen, Francis and Butchay have to undergo a major adjustment. Francis concepts in real life with Gwen learned a Junior Prom at the High School after a while Butchay helps the Kitchen and prepared food. In the process, they learn to accept each other’s differences, find the meaning of true love, and grasp the essence of family.
The Kings of Star Magic
| 6 | "All About A Girl" | Piolo Pascual, Lauren Young, AJ Perez | Joey Reyes | Delfin "Pinong" Ilao | September 2, 2006 |
Alvin (Piolo Pascual) is about to follow his ladylove, a nurse in Canada. While processing his papers, he stays with his close relatives in Manila. There, he meets Lea (Lauren Young), a teener with very low self esteem. Alvin develops brotherly concern for Lea and helps her build her self-confidence to be a better person. Lea misunderstands this and thinks he is courting her. She falls for Alvin and more complications arise as Piolo’s cousin Egay (AJ Perez) is in love with Lea secretly.
| 7 | "The Game of Love" | Diether Ocampo, Paw Diaz | Joel Lamangan | Maribel Ilag | September 9, 2006 |
Best friends Boggs and Gary (Diether Ocampo) are complete opposites. Boggs is the nerd and "torpe" guy while Gary is the heartbreaking, guy next door. A girl named Kat (Paw Diaz) catches Boggs’ attention and he asks for some courting tips from his pal. Kat happens to be Gary’s most recent ex-girlfriend. While he helps Boggs in wooing Kat, love rekindles for the second time around. Gary is about to make the biggest decision of his life. Should he choose his best friend over his ex-girlfriend? Or will he choose love over friendship?
| 8 | "My Angel" | John Lloyd Cruz, Carla Humphries | Don Cuaresma | Reggie Amigo | September 16, 2006 |
Martin (John Lloyd Cruz) is a typical guy who meets "the angel" of his dreams named Shane (Carla Humphries). She is a rocker chick who looks like a she-devil. He gets a complete shock though, when he discovers that her personality is totally different from her physical looks. She has a good heart that brings joy to Martin's heart. But in the midst of their blossoming love, both are about to face the biggest challenge of their relationship. Both have to understand their personality differences and cope with their own family problems at the same time. Will they survive the test of love?
| 9 | "The Sweetest Victory" | Zanjoe Marudo, Angelica Panganiban | Jerry Lopez Sineneng, Lyan Suiza | John Roque | September 23, 2006 |
Robert (Zanjoe Marudo) is a wealthy heartthrob who's the current toast of swimming competitions. He meets an accident after his longtime girlfriend dumps him in pursuit of a career abroad. Unknown to his ex, Robert became comatose. While he was in deep sleep, Angel (Angelica Panganiban), a nurse who has been loving him from afar since their college days, takes care of him. Robert, in his mind through voiceovers, interacts with Angel as they share funny and tender moments. Luckily, he awakens from his sleep and is helped by Angel to get back into shape for the national eliminations. As things develop between the two, Roberts's ex-girlfriend comes back and ruins their blossoming relationship. Will true love triumph? Which of the women will he deem his sweetest victory?
| 10 | "Tender Loving Care" | Sam Milby, Denise Laurel | Gilbert Perez | John Roque | September 30, 2006 |
Calvin (Sam Milby) is a graduate of medicine, waiting for a study grant abroad. He plans to pursue his medical profession with his girlfriend Paula (Michelle Madrigal). While waiting for his travel documents, Calvin volunteers as a caregiver in a local institute for the elderly, something that is close to his heart, having grown up with his grandparents. There he meets Dianne (Denise Laurel), a nurse, who just like him is fond of the elderly. They both are assigned to Lola Coring (Gloria Romero) who is known to be the most difficult to deal with patient in the institute. With Lola Coring playing matchmaker, will Calvin and Dianne fall in love?
The Princesses and Princes of Star Magic
| 11 | "5 Minutes" | Joross Gamboa, Roxanne Guinoo | Don Cuaresma | Maribel Ilag | October 7, 2006 |
Melvin (Joross Gamboa) and Jessie (Roxanne Guinoo) are reluctant speed daters who were only forced to join the said activity by their friends. Unexpectedly they meet and click. Both are hung up on their exes until they realize that they deserve better. Come to think of it, they're actually better together. A misunderstanding causes them to part ways, until another speed dating event leads them again to each other's arms. This time though, they both want to take it slow.
| 12 | "Bongga" | Sandara Park, John Wayne Sace | Malu Sevilla | Maribel Ilag | October 14, 2006 |
Anton (John Wayne Sace) and Barbie (Sandara Park) have been dating for quite some time now though Anton is yet to meet Barbie’s parents. It turns out that Barbie is an adopted child and her guardians are actually three gay men! She has been keeping it a secret, afraid that Anton’s family will not like her for having such a background. Anton sets up a meeting between his and Barbie's parents. At first, Barbie and her gay dad pass with flying colors with the help of a prostitute pretending to be her mother. But soon, the truth is out and the two lovers find themselves caught between their feelings for each other and their families.
| 13 | "My Friend, My Love, My Destiny" | Rayver Cruz, Shaina Magdayao | Joel Lamangan | John Roque | October 21, 2006 |
Yeng (Shaina Magdayao) and Jun (Rayver Cruz) are best friends who are destined to fall in love despite their opposing beliefs about choice and fate. Yeng believes in the power of destiny while Jun believes in the power of choice. When Jun admits he is falling in love with Yeng, she asks for signs to guide her decision. The first two signs work out, but the third and the last one does not. In the end, will Yeng choose her love over her belief in destiny?
| 14 | "Love and The City" | Nikki Gil, Geoff Eigenmann | Joel Lamangan | Trystan Gaynor | October 28, 2006 |
Sonny (Geoff Eigenmann) is from a rich family in the province. He sets out to Manila despite his parents’ disapproval for he wants to see what’s in store for him in the city. Here, he encounters Trina (Nikki Gil), a street-smart gal who gives him tips on urban survival. Sonny admires Trina’s wisdom and strength and eventually falls in love with her. But Trina has a lifetime dream of going to America. She exhausts all ways and means, ultimately finding an American citizen willing to marry her for 40 thousand pesos. Since this is his loved one’s lifetime dream, Sonny sells his beloved cow to raise the money for her trip. But Sonny is disheartened when Trina accepts the money. Will Trina ever realize that the dream she’s looking for is right in front of her? Or will Sonny accept defeat and return to his simple life in the province?
| 15 | "Ang Lovey Kong All Around" | Kim Chiu, Gerald Anderson | Joel Lamangan | Shaira Mella | November 4, 2006 |
Baby Girl (Kim Chiu) just wants to live a normal teenage life but her overprotective brothers, Max (Carlos Agassi) and Brad (Bernard Palanca), think she should just focus on her studies. Her desire for freedom and the brothers’ adamance are a constant source of conflict until the brothers stumble on a brilliant strategy – set up their baby sister with a harmless boy. Enter Sonny Boy (Gerald Anderson), who is rumored to be gay. The brothers’ strategy boomerangs on them though, because Sonny Boy turns out to be as male as male can be.
| 16 | "Sabihin Mo Lang" | Maja Salvador, Zanjoe Marudo, Jason Abalos | Joey Reyes | Maribel Ilag | November 18, 2006 |
Celine (Maja Salvador) and Simon (Jason Abalos) are chatmates and Celine believes that she has finally met the guy of her dreams in the internet chatroom. They have instant chemistry and with the guy’s good looks, nothing could stop Celine from meeting up with him. They meet up in an eyeball party with Celine thinking that it could be a beginning of a real relationship. But it turns out Simon got cold feet and sent his friend (Zanjoe) in his place instead. Celine gets swept off her feet but somehow things feel different. She later discovers that the guy she met in the chatroom and in the party are two different people. Now, who will Celine choose, the guy she is attracted to because of his looks or the one who she easily had a connection with?

=== Season 2: Abt Ur Luv ===
Abt Ur Luv logo

For its second and third seasons, Star Magic Presents shifts to a youth-oriented drama format, assembling 19 of its teen talents for a season-long story entitled Abt Ur Luv, under the direction of Erick C. Salud.

The cast is topbilled by the loveteam of Shaina Magdayao and Rayver Cruz.

Other cast members include: Carla Humphries and Denise Laurel; New Star Magic talents Victor Basa, Angelo Patrimonio, and Enchong Dee; PBB Teens Aldred Gatchalian, Joaqui Mendoza, and Mikki Arceo; and Star Circle Batch 13 talents Aaron Agassi, Valeen Montenegro, Christopher Gutierrez, AJ Perez, Dino Imperial, Empress Schuck, Lauren Young, and Zia Marquez.

=== Season 3: Abt Ur Luv, Ur Lyf 2 ===
For its third season, Abt Ur Luv continues with more cast including John Wayne Sace and Erich Gonzales and some other Star Magic batch 15 teens.

=== Season 4: Astigs ===
Is another teen-oriented show that will feature different stories every six weeks. For its initial offering "Astigs in Haayskul Life" is a story about five losers who make their own club named Astig.
