= List of La Luna Sangre characters =

List of characters from the 2017 Philippine television series La Luna Sangre

This is a list of characters from the 2017 Philippine action-horror-fantasy drama television series La Luna Sangre.

== Main cast ==
=== Malia Ortega Rodriguez / Emilio "Miyo" Alcantara / Toni Lumakad ===
Portrayed by Kathryn Bernardo (adult) and Erika Clemente (child), she is the New Chosen One who defeats the evil vampire marked with the cursed ink, hybrid offspring of Mateo and Lia, the granddaughter of Noah, Lyka, Roman and Ceres and Supremo's enemy. The series follows her path to fulfilling her destiny as protector of the races. After Supremo kills her parents, Malia lives in Manila assuming two identities: Miyo Alcantara (male) and Toni Lumakad (female) to penetrate Supremo's organization. Police assassinate Miyô but she resurrects from the dead with powers stronger than other vampires. She gathers the remnant survivors of the massacre and reorganizes the La Liga Unida. Malia is proclaimed LLU's Head Guardian. Malia strives to protect the three races from the evil of Supremo and restore the peaceful coexistence of the species that her ancestors fought to establish. She does not give up on Tristan and wins him back to their side, successfully averting a war that would end their kind. She gains her full powers when she transforms into a hybrid combination of werewolf and vampire.

=== Tristan S. Torralba / Tristan "Imperador" Imperial ===
Portrayed by Daniel Padilla (adult) and Justin James Quilantang (child). The story tracks his life journey as he pursues revenge against vampires who destroyed his family. He joins the Moonchasers, a vigilante group that protects humans against vampires. He has an aggressive and stubborn personality. Moonchasers' headmaster, Prof. T describes him as a warrior and "special, but difficult to control.”

Tristan is Magnus’ natural child with Rica Sison, a mortal woman. He rejects Sandrino and the evil vampires when he learns of his true nature, and despite Sandrino's warnings about man's treacherous nature and their fear and hatred towards vampires, Tristan holds on to the belief that the humans will not betray him.

After the battle, Sandrino raises Tristan from his death and awakens the cursed ink granting Tristan unparalleled strength. Tristan becomes the Imperator of the vampires. While Supremo plans their attack against Malia, Tristan secretly protects humans from increasing vampire attacks. And contrary to Sandrino's plans, he is determined to annihilate the supernatural species but is conflicted about Malia's fate because he loves her. Tristan's path is foreshadowed early in the series when his stepfather advises the six year old that his real battle would be waged in his heart. In the final battle, Tristan and Malia defeat Sandrino.

=== Sandrino "Supremo" Villalobo / Gilbert Imperial ===
Portrayed by Richard Gutierrez (adult) and Zyren Leigh Luansing (child), he has three aliases: Sandrino, Supremo and Gilbert Imperial. The story records Sandrino Villalobo's tragic existence after a series of unfortunate incidents sends him on a trajectory towards evil. He is the main antagonist of the series.

Sandrino's father, the vampire Magnus rapes his mother, Maria Villalobo, to sire the chosen one. Despised by his mother, the mortal Sandrino suffers a violent childhood, his mother keeps him imprisoned. Deprived of food, starvation leads him to feed on live chickens and drink animal blood. In a fit of rage, he kills Maria when she attempts to push him off the balcony. He escapes into the forest with Barang, lonely until he meets Rica Sison, a Luna officer who loves and becomes pregnant by his father. She is the only person who shows him kindness and acceptance. When the Lunas capture Rica and kill Sandrino, Barang invokes the spell of the Cursed Ink, conferring upon him a protection from all weapons and transforms him into a vampire. Barang fuels his anger until the curse consumes his soul. He assumes the leadership of his race and becomes the Supremo, the King of evil vampires and architect of a utopian world without werewolves where humans exist solely as their food source.

He takes the name Gilbert Imperial, the name Rica meant for Tristan, meaning “a promise fulfilled.” Gilbert mingles in the mortal world as CEO of a conglomerate and sets the wheels in motion for a perfect world for vampires. On the night Jacintha stabs him with the first Werewolf's fang and destroys the curse inside him, Supremo loses the cursed ink's protection but does not die. Through the Ancient Book of Spells, he discovers the infinite power both marks grant and gets it when he defeats Tristan. Possessing both marks creates two distinct personalities: the Supremo consumed with hatred, consequently overpowering Sandrino who still retained his humanity. The battle between Supremo and Sandrino is significant to the outcome of the story. In the finale, he was killed by Tristan and Malia and thanked Tristan for defeating the evil inside him.

=== Jacintha Magsaysay ===
Angel Locsin's third character portrayal in the Moonstone Trilogy is Jacintha Magsaysay. She is Malia herself, a time traveler from the future, precursor of Malia who came to the present time when her powers had not yet manifested. Jacintha’s mission is to facilitate the path for Malia to defeat Supremo. Jacintha surfaces 14 years after the LLU massacre. Gilbert Imperial hires her as his Political Strategist when he runs for President of the Philippines. On the night of the blood moon, she uses the First Werewolf’s fang to end the cursed ink inside Sandrino, stripping him of his invincibility and weakens him. She reluctantly kills Tristan before he turns into a vampire and then disappears into thin air. Angel plays Jacintha and she also reprises her role of Lia from Imortal.

== Special participation ==
- Lia Raymundo Ortega-Rodriguez, portrayed by Angel Locsin, is the daughter of Noah and Lyka and the former “Chosen One” and Head Guardian of her pack in Imortal series, who ends the conflict between werewolves and vampires in the last war against Magnus and the Hybrids. Lia becomes a mortal woman when she and Mateo transfer their special powers and protection onto their infant daughter, Malia, who is stillborn. Her family's peaceful life in San Isidro is disrupted when Supremo discovers their whereabouts. She is killed by Supremo, along with her husband Mateo.
- Mateo Rodriguez, portrayed by John Lloyd Cruz, is the strongest vampire in Imortal series. He is the biological son of Roman and Ceres, a vampire man and a mortal woman; the first mortal child born out of such a union because vampires cannot have children. Mateo is the only child living in Roman's vampire community. He later marries Lia Ortega and together they establish La Liga Unida. He becomes a mortal man when he and Lia transfer their powers to revive their stillborn infant daughter, Malia. His family's peaceful life in San Isidro ends when they are forced to flee from Supremo and his vampire minions. To save his family, he asks Gael to turn him into a vampire so he can fight squarely against Supremo in the battle of San Isidro. He thinks he is able to kill Supremo but it turns out to be an illusionary trick Supremo perfected since he was a child. He is eventually killed by Supremo, with Lia and an unknown young child who Lia switches with Baristo. He reprises his role from Imortal.
- Samantha Imperial, portrayed by Maricar Reyes-Poon, is the co-founder of Moonchasers and Jacintha's tag team. She is Magnus' adopted daughter and Sandrino's and Tristan's half-sister. Her mother is bitten by Magnus while carrying Samantha in her womb. After failing to sire a vampire child who he believed would be the destined savior of the vampire race, he decides to raise Samantha and grooms her as their chosen savior. He turns her into a vampire at 21 years. She falls in love with Mateo but he loves Lia. Samantha turns her back on her father and their evil goals, and joins Lydia and Roman's community of righteous vampires who subsist on animal blood. Samantha has a love-hate relationship with Lia but they become strong allies and mutually respect each other. She is bitten by Lucas at the last battle against Lucas and Magnus in Imortal, and commits suicide to prevent herself from turning into a hybrid. She is the only cremated vampire known. She repeatedly commits suicide because she views her immortality as a curse but resurrects each time. She cannot die because she has a specific mission to fulfill in saving humanity. She plays a significant part in her brother Sandrino's redemption, and works in tandem with Jacintha and Prof. T in fending off Supremo. Together with Prof. T, she establishes the Moonchasers for the purpose of derailing Supremo's plans. She is extremely intelligent and calculative. She is aware of Tristan's role in the prophecy and does everything to keep him away from Sandrino. She reconnects with Barang and learns that Sandrino is her sibling. Despite their kinship, Samantha refuses Sandrino's offer to ally with him. Her secret alliance with Jacintha provides powerful cover for the Moonchasers and LLU members during their missions, providing distractions to keep Supremo away from Malia until she gains her powers. She is killed by her half-brother, Sandrino, after pretending to be the lady in red to protect Jacintha's identity. She dies without knowing that Tristan is also her half-brother. In the finale, Sandrino is killed by Tristan and Malia, avenging her death. She reprises her role from Imortal.
- Theodore Montemayor, portrayed by Albert Martinez, known as "Prof. T", is the headmaster of Moonchasers and a scientist. He graduated Biomedical Engineering from Pennsylvania State University. His wife and daughter are killed by a vampire, and since then, vampire research becomes his life's work. He returns to the Philippines to organize an elite force of youth vigilantes who call themselves Moonchasers. As a scientist, he develops several anti-vampire weapons, such as the silver spear made of werewolf fang, a memory blocker spray that permanently removes traumatic memory encounters with vampires, a blood treatment serum that rapidly heals wounds infected by vampires, and a serum that temporarily protects mortals against vampire bites by converting their blood into a bitter tasting poison for vampires.
- Rica "Fall" Sison-Torralba, is portrayed by actress Tanya Garcia, is Tristan's mother and the wife of Tonio, it was revealed that she was raped by Magnus, she was saved by Tonio from Sandrino and Barang. Tonio married her even though she's already carrying the son of Magnus, they also had their own child named Apple. She became a vampire and never seen by her children.
- Barang, portrayed by Shamaine Centenera-Buencamino (Present) and Kalila Aguilos (Imortal series), is Magnus's seer who lies about her prophecy to manipulate events for her own self-serving goals.She has a big influence on Sandrino, the seer who casts the cursed ink on him, and turns him into a vampire to save his life. She shares Magnus’ vision of creating a perfect world rid of werewolves, with humans as their main food source, a world controlled and led by vampires. She raises Sandrino on this evil vision, steers him away from love, and directs him towards his father's path of death and destruction. When she realizes Sandrino is falling for Jacintha, she rouses his suspicions about her and encourages him to kill more innocents to stop his beating heart. Bent on proving Jacintha's duplicity, she discovers that Samantha and Jacintha are allies. Jacintha kills her before she can tell Sandrino. In the final seconds before she dies, she recognizes her killer is not Lia.
- Atty. Elize is portrayed by Wilma Doesnt. Supremo's vampire Ally. She works for SMV Corporation as a corporate lawyer. She taught Diana about the vampire world. She died during the LLU Massacre.
- Malina is portrayed by Maika Rivera. Supremo's Ally. She died during the Massacre.

== Supporting cast ==
- Jake Arguelles, portrayed by Tony Labrusca, is Malia's childhood best friend in LLU, Frederick and Veruska Arguelles' werewolf son, heir to head guardian post to succeed Malia. He is in love with Malia. He kills his mother, Veruska, when she becomes a hybrid. He now serves in the Waya Board.
- Beatrice "Betty" Torralba-Domingo, portrayed by Gelli de Belen, is Tonio's sister, Tristan's and Apple's aunt. She is the first successful human who survives a vampire's bite with the virus/serum protocol formulated by Prof T. However, the effects are temporary. She marries Doc and is killed by Supremo's allies on her wedding day.
- Veruska Arguelles, portrayed by Ina Raymundo, is Jake's werewolf mother who betrays Matteo and Lia and the LLU for her ambitions. Supremo turns her into a hybrid and releases her to kill other werewolves. She is captured by Jake and the LLU fail to figure out how to cure her hybrid condition. She asks for Malia's forgiveness before she dies. She was a member of the Waya Council.
- Frederick Arguelles, portrayed by Victor Neri, is Jake’s werewolf father and LLU’s Head Guardian and Waya Council president with Malia as his future successor. He stayed in hiding with his family and surviving LLU members from Sandrino and his rebel vampires. He is against his wife’s ambitions for their son. Near the end of the massacre, he dies protecting his family and fellow werewolves and vampires from death. His death was avenged by Malia after she and Tristan killed Sandrino.
- Baristo Elizeo, portrayed by Joross Gamboa, is the werewolf who saves young Malia after her parents are killed by Supremo. He raises Malia as her surrogate father, and is a core member of the LLU leadership and sits in the Waya council. He is killed by Sandrino after he tried to avenge Lia and Mateo by attacking him. He dies trying to protect Tristan's grandparents. His death was avenged by Malia after she and Tristan killed Sandrino.
- Gael Mercado, portrayed by Bryan Santos. In the Imortal series, he chooses to become a vampire as an alternative to cancer. He is originally loyal to Magnus, but he switches his alliance to Mateo and Lia and fights against Lucas’ hybrid allies at the finale of Imortal. In La Luna Sangre, he is among the core group of LLU senior leaders. In the new order, he is President and CEO of Waya Inc. He reprises his role from Imortal.
- Catleya Del Luna, portrayed by Sue Ramirez, a werewolf and Baristo and Lydia’s adoptive daughter. She is also an adoptive sister to Malia and the junior representative in LLU. She survived the massacre and stayed in keen sight with Malia, Gael, Baristo, Jake, and then eventually Veruska and Jethro. While battling Sandrino, she was captured and tortured. Due to her brutal injuries, she was sent to China for medical treatment. Her fate is left unknown though it was implied that Catleya healed and returned to the LLU.
- Lemuel Ruiz, portrayed by Khalil Ramos, is a Filipino-American DJ, who becomes a vampire as part of Supremo's plan to turn celebrities into vampire allies. Supremo's vampire servants think he cannot survive the transition from mortal to vampire, so they leave his body for dead. As a new vampire, he meets Malia who convinces him to choose the alternative of drinking animal blood instead of human blood. He becomes Malia's staunchest ally and LLU member and working in the Waya Corp. He is working on cure for vampirism.
- Lydia Samonte, portrayed by Nikki Valdez, a strong vampire, key LLU member, and Mateo’s former guardian who entered a relationship with Baristo and became an adoptive mother to Malia and Catleya. She was killed by Sandrino during the massacre’s ending by buying Malia time to escape with the survivors. Her death was avenged by Malia after she and Tristan killed Sandrino. She reprised her role from Imortal.
- Jethro Kabigting, portrayed by Dino Imperial, a seer from Imortal series, Enrico "Tikboy" Kabigting's son and Trixie's nephew. His family are psychics who long serve the Waya Inc., an organization that governs all werewolves, coordinates with the mortals’ government, and protects mortals from vampires. He sees visions through psychometry and can communicate with other seers using telepathy. He is captured and imprisoned by Sandrino for fourteen years, and as a result, the LLU does not have crucial psychic guidance to battle Supremo. He escapes and reunites with Malia and the LLU. From the Ancient Book of Spells he learns that the cursed ink harnesses its power from a heart consumed with anger and hatred, rid of humanity. He reprises his role from Imortal.
- Clarisse Zaragoza, portrayed by Niña Dolino, a black werewolf and LLU/Waya Council member, she was the daughter of former veteran Waya member Lucille Zaragoza. She was originally an enemy to Lia though became Lia’s ally in the end. She was part of the original Waya Board. She sacrificed herself to protect Lia, Matteo, and Malia from Sandrino. Her death was avenged by Malia after she and Tristan killed Sandrino. She reprised her role from Imortal.
- Erin, portrayed by Polo Ravales, a high ranking Luna officer and later the de facto leader, and part of the rebuilt LLU. He was deeply traumatized by the death of his Luna comrades that it made him believe that there isn't any good in both werewolves and vampires. This led to him to defy LLU and Malia's orders and defected from the group along with the remaining Luna soldiers. He was later captured and killed by Sandrino after attempting to kill his half-brother, Tristan, who was the prophesied enemy of Malia.
- Diana, portrayed by Sam Pinto, a human turned vampire who is Sandrino's lover and second-in command. She fought the werewolves and LLU vampires during the massacre. She took a job as a bartender in Sandrino's club called Heat Bar as a cover for her activities. She is killed in cold blood by Sandrino after he thought that she was betraying him.
- Luningning "Ningning" Ramos is portrayed by Kristel Fulgar (adult) and Elia Ilano (child), childhood friend of Malia in San Isidro, Nognog's best friend and girlfriend. She is a games and computer wizard. A celebrity in her own right as the eSports champion of DATU Asian Tournament (Final Round), she is recruited to work as celebrity endorser and ambassador for Youtopia. Later in the series, she reunites with Malia and becomes a spy for Malia in Gilbert's camp. Jacintha rescues her and she becomes part of Malia's staff in Waya Farms.
- Apple Torralba, portrayed by Maymay Entrata, the only natural child of Tonio and Rica Toralba. She is Tristan's half-sister, born after Rica joins the Toralbas as Tonio's wife. After Tristan's “death”, she inherits her brother's Trust Fund left by their mother, Rica, bringing the surviving Toralbas out of poverty with substantial funds to live on.
- Gabriel Torralba, portrayed by Noel Trinidad, is Tristan and Apple's grandfather. He knows that Tristan is not Tonio's child when the infant suffers a health crisis, but keeps the information secret out of respect for Tonio and Rica's wishes. He loves Tristan as his grandson. He is killed by Sandrino after being taken hostage by him. But in the finale, Sandrino is killed by Tristan and Malia, avenging his death.
- Pina Torralba, portrayed by Debraliz Valasote, is Tristan and Apple's grandmother. She is killed by Sandrino after being taken hostage by him. But in the finale, Sandrino is killed in the final battle by Tristan and Malia, avenging her death.
- Noel "Doc" Domingo, portrayed by Randy Santiago, is Tristan's surrogate father while growing up, and Betty's fiancé. They get married on the same day vampires kill her. He looks after the surviving Toralbas after the war and moves in with the Toralbas in their mansion. He is Collin's biological father.
- Summer Sison, portrayed by Desiree del Valle, Tristan and Apple's aunt, Rica's eldest sister, who Tristan grows up with after his father died. Tristan works as a driver and mechanic for her operations. She is assigned as trustee for Tristan's Trust Fund which he inherits from his mother Rica when he turns 21. The Trust is her sole agenda for keeping Tristan. She tries to deplete the trust fund by deducting made up debts.
- Miguel, portrayed by Michael Agassi, a vampire, one of LLU's right hand members under Frederick's leadership, and trainer for the young werewolves and vampires. He met his end during the massacre by Sandrino's lover and one of his vampires, Diana. His death was avenged by Malia after she and Tristan killed Sandrino.
- Nora, portrayed by Mikylla Ramirez, a white wolf, Malia’s friend, and LLU member. She turned into a werewolf on her birthday. She was killed by vampires during the massacre and was avenged by Malia after she and Tristan killed Sandrino.
- Bogart , portrayed by Hyubs Azarcon, is Tristan's friend and co-mechanic, also living with the Toralbas in their mansion.
- Collin Domingo, portrayed by Edward Barber, is Apple's bodyguard and one of the housekeepers of the Torralbas in their new home. He is Doc's long lost son.
- Dolores "Dory" Lumakad, portrayed by Sylvia Sanchez, the mother of Miyo and the wife of Gilbert.

== Extended cast ==
- Soraya Laurent is portrayed by Denise Laurel. She is a former member of La Liga Unida's council. She is the leader of the black werewolves who are historical enemies of the Lunas and white werewolves. Soraya intends to reverse Lyka Ortega's decades old agreement which united the Black and White werewolves. Her main objective is to invalidate the strict prohibition of the killing of humans. She and her black werewolves join Supremo to destroy Tristan and Malia. She is killed by Greta, remaining loyal to Supremo until the end.
- Miriam Villamor is portrayed by Erika Padilla. She is Lia's werewolf best friend and Abraham Villamor's daughter. She fought alongside Lia and Mateo at the last battle against Magnus and the Hybrids in Imortal. She returns to Waya Corp after the war to serve in the board, a loyal ally of Malia. She reprises her role in Imortal.
- Geneva Del Pino is portrayed by Pinky Amador. She is part of La Liga Unida's council and heads the community outreach programs of Waya Corp. She is a traitor alongside Soraya, pushing the council to unseat Malia. She was killed by Supremo during the duel of Jake and Soraya to replace Malia as Punong Bantay.
- Senator Salvador Paglinauan, portrayed by Freddie Webb. A veteran senator who has been a political ally to Gilbert Imperial (Supremo's alias).
- Pres. Osmundo Mercado is portrayed by Cris Villanueva. He is the President of the Philippines and opponent of Zeny Mallari, wife of the late Sen. Mallari. Osmundo is an ally of Supremo and Tristan, but is privy to Tristan's plan to protect the humans: to destroy all supernaturals by engaging a war between Supremo's vampires and Malia’ LLU. He defied Supremo and was severely injured by him as a result.
- Lucho Herrero/Ermitanyo is portrayed by Ketchup Eusebio. He is introduced as an ally of Jacintha Magsaysay and member of the board of Waya Corp. He pretends to challenge Malia's decisions to flush out all suspected traitors in the board. He is the old hermit wizard in the forest who hands Jacintha the Aklat ng Gaway giving her insight on how to defeat Sandrino's cursed ink. He allows Malia to glimpse her comrades deaths and Tristan's fate. He has the power to shapeshift and rise from death like Samantha. Soraya's followers thinks they killed him, but he warns Malia of Supremo's plans to kill Tristan and explains the weakness of the cursed ink providing the key to ultimately defeat Supremo.
- Jill Imperial is portrayed by Dominic Roque. He is a businessman who intends to buy Waya Corporation, a secret ally of Supremo who turns him into a vampire.
- Professor Ellie Montemayor is portrayed by Karen Timbol. She is Prof. T's wife and partner in researching the Red Serum which will exterminate the supernaturals. She was killed by Soraya at the raid of the Moonchasers headquarters.
- Winter Sison is portrayed by Alora Sasam, Tristan and Apple's aunt. She has no sympathy for Tristan when he grows up with them, but she returns in Book 2 to hand Tristan's trust fund to Apple and her grandparents.
- Spring Sison is portrayed by Joan Bugcat, Tristan and Apple's aunt. She is compassionate and kind towards him, and secretly lends him money to help him move his family to Manila.
- Porky Generoso is portrayed by Jharmin Saddam. He is Tristan's friend and co-mechanic who moves in with the Toralbas after the war.
- Berto Lumakad is portrayed by Dennis Padilla. He is Miyo's surrogate father, Dory's husband, and adopted father to Greta, Kuto and Lisa. He is the neighborhood watchdog and peacekeeper, but after the explosion that kills his wife and grandchild, he becomes a drunk.
- Greta Lumakad is portrayed by Meryll Soriano. She is the eldest sibling of the Lumakads, Miyo's adoptive family. She is a single mother to an infant daughter who dies along with her mother Dory from the gas explosion at their home. While recuperating in the hospital, she is turned into a vampire by one of Supremo's minions. She hates Malia for her duplicity, blames her for the disintegration of her family, and her mother's and daughter's deaths. She is bent on revenge and becomes the strongest of Sandrino's vampires but at the finale, unites with Malia after Supremo sends Soraya to kill her.
- Kuto Lumakad is portrayed by John Steven De Guzman, part of Dory and Berto Lumakad's adoptive family. After the explosion that kills his mother and niece, his adopted sister Greta moves the Lumakads to an unknown location. Kuto is last seen by Tristan and the Moonchasers outside their abandoned home.
- Lisa Lumakad is portrayed by Chun Sa Jung, part of Dory and Berto Lumakad's adoptive family. She is severely wounded in the gas explosion at their home that kills her mother and niece.
- Andrey Dominic Ilagan is characterized by Patrick Sugui. He is among the first batch member of Moonchasers, and was killed by Supremo during one of their confrontations.
- Lauren Catapang, and Joey Martinez, portrayed by Jane De Leon, and Michelle Vito, two of the first batch of Moonchasers recruited by Prof T. Lauren dies protecting Sr. Mallari and his family. Joey fought valiantly during the Moonchasers massacre to avenge the latter but lost her live during the battle.
- Rambo, portrayed by Lance Pimentel, one of the first batch of Moonchasers recruited by Prof T. He survives the Moonchasers massacre but is captured by Sandrino and his forces who then turns him into a vampire but when he didn’t waver to the vampire king about his teammates, his life was slain.
- Leo Nakpil is portrayed by Joshua Colet. He is among the first batch member of Moonchasers. He is the group's problem solver and mediator. He was killed by Soraya's black werewolves.
- Piolo James Magbanua is portrayed by Badjie Mortiz. He is among the first batch member of Moonchasers. He is also known as "Mata", Tristan's childhood foe and close friend as adults. Prof. T acknowledges his limited fighting skills, but remains with the group as Moonchasers' technical specialist.
- Hanno Parlingao is portrayed by Joe Vargas He is among the first batch member of Moonchasers and the only member who survives. In the finale, he was seen protecting the humans from their death from Supremo. Thanks to Jake disabling the comm tower, he and everyone succeeded proctecting everyone.
- Harbin Contreras is portrayed by Mark Neumann. He is a second batch member of Moonchasers and after the war, he assisted Prof T with his vampire experiments. He was killed by Supremo.
- Levi Esguerra is portrayed by AJ Muhlach. He is one of the second batch of Moonchasers. He is killed by Supremo's vampires during the Moonchasers/La Liga Unida mission and battle.
- Aira Feliz "Aife" Javier is portrayed by Barbie Imperial. She was part of the second batch of Moonchasers. She was one of the Moonchasers captured by the vampires and later dies after getting her blood drained by Sandrino.
- Madame Star is portrayed by Mel Kimura. A fortuneteller who pretends to predict the fate of individuals through Palmistry. She surreptitiously uses social media to obtain information about her clients. Although her predictions are mostly wild guesses, she has real psychic abilities: Tarot Cards and Precognition. She accurately predicts Samantha's death at the hands of Supremo. She is fearful of Tristan, and sees him as a vampire in her recurring dreams.
- Borris Antonio is portrayed by Ali Khatibi. Supremos' trusted vampire ally. He is The General Manager of a construction firm. He was killed by Jacintha after Barang sent him to till her.
- Tasha is portrayed by Garrie Concepcion. A werewolf under Malia's Era. She is trusted by Malia. In the new order, she was a bait by Soraya to Supremo and later killed by him with Virgel.
- Virgel is portrayed by Paolo Rivero. A good black werewolf that went to China then came back to help LLU's battle with Supremo. In the new order, he was a bait given to Supremo by Soraya to prove her loyalty and was later killed.
- Tilda is portrayed by MJ Lastimosa One of the vampire servants of Supremo. After the night of La Luna Sangre, she became an ally of La Liga Unida and gave her loyalty to Malia.
- Katrina is portrayed by Bea Rose Santiago. She's Supremo's vampire ally. She sometimes make love with Supremo and follows whatever it orders to her. She was killed by Tristan during the heroes ball.
- Elisse is portrayed by Cindy Miranda. One of the loyal servants of Supremo. She is remaining loyal to Supremo and became the spy of Supremo inside Waya Corporation. She theft the Aklat ng Wagay.
- James Vinzon is portrayed by Kirst Viray. One of the vampire servants of Supremo. He was caught by La Liga Unida with Andrei. After the Night of La Luna Sangre he, Andrei and Tilda joined forces with LLU.
- Andrei Javier is portrayed by Yuki Sakamoto. One of Supremo's vampire servant. In the new order he became part of La Liga Unida with James and Tilda.

== Flashback appearance ==
- Lyka Blancaflor Raymundo-Ortega is portrayed by Angel Locsin, former head guardian of the werewolves, who succeeds Lady Elle after successfully unifying the warring factions between black and white werewolves. For the last decades, Werewolves have long been the protectors of humans, successfully overpowering vampires and driving them underground. But there are rebel werewolves who continue to prey on humans, turning black when they drink human blood. Under Lyka's leadership, the black werewolves vow to protect and stop feeding on humans. She is a “Nilaktawan“ (late bloomer), a trait she inherits from her werewolf mother Vanessa Blancaflor Raymundo and werewolf grandfather, Lorenzo Blancaflor whose own transformations to Werewolf and powers manifest late past the proper time. She is known as the "Huling Bantay" (The Last Sentinel/The Last Guardian), who saves her entire race of werewolves from the poisonous and deadly curse of "Pulang Buwan" (The Red Moon). Her husband is Noah Ortega, member of the elite Luna Force. She and Noah have twin sons and a daughter, Lia. She resigns as head guardian of the wayas after her family perish in a vampire ambush. Bereft over their deaths, she decides to focus on raising her only surviving daughter without the distractions of governing the Waya Council. She is killed by Magnus in Imortal after he sabotages a secret peace talk between werewolves and Roman's vampire community. Before she dies, through the power of her love, she confers on her daughter Lia all her powers and a special protection against vampires, the power to burn them with her hands. She is erroneously branded a traitor by her successor Lucille Zaragoza, who blames her for her husband's death. This is the background of the Imortal series: the continuing saga of the Blancaflor descendants and the emergence of Lia as the Chosen One who brings peace between man, vampires and werewolves.
- Noah Ortega is played by Piolo Pascual. He is the bravest member of the Luna Force in his generation. He serves the Philippine Army before he becomes a Luna Force member. Before he falls in love with his wife, Lyka Raymundo and learns her true nature as a werewolf, Noah is the werewolves’ most feared enemy. Aside from his superior fighting skills, Noah has a natural immunity from the toxin released from werewolves’ fangs and claws, making him a formidable enemy. At first, Lunas are commissioned to protect humans against the black werewolves who often kill and feast on humans. After Lyka's leadership, the killing of humans becomes strictly prohibited, with Lunas commissioned to protect werewolves also. Lunas fight alongside the Philippine army and the Waya army. When the threat of vampires becomes prevalent, the Lunas are effective vampire hunters. He and Lyka have twin sons and a daughter, Lia. He is killed by a vampire during Lia's 5th birthday in Imortal, and perishes with his twin sons and mother in law, Vanessa Raymundo. His granddaughter Malia inherits the gene that makes him immune from werewolves’ scratches, and it is clearly exhibited when the LLU tests the range of her powers.
- Roman Rodriguez is played by Jomari Yllana. He is Mateo's biological vampire father and Ceres' husband. He is the vampire who establishes a civilized vampire community who do not feed on human blood. He teaches them to hunt animals instead. He is killed by Lucille in Imortal while he is held captive.
- Ceres Rodriguez is portrayed by Precious Lara Quigaman. She is Mateo's biological mortal mother and Roman's wife. She dies giving birth to Mateo. Roman decides to keep her as mortal to spare her the curse of immortality. She is the first woman to carry a child sired by a vampire.
- Magnus Imperial is played by Jake Roxas. He is Samantha's adoptive father and leader of the evil vampires. He bites Lucas and turns him into the first hybrid (half-werewolf and half-vampire). He is killed by Lucille in Imortal. In La Luma Sangre series, he is introduced as Sandrino's father who rapes Sandrino's mother to sire a child. He is also Tristan's father with a mortal he loved, Rica Toralba.
- Imelda Fontanilla is portrayed by Francine Prieto. She is responsible for turning Magnus into a vampire. She is in love with Magnus but fights against him and Lucas at the last war of the races in Imortal when she switches her alliance to Mateo and Lia. She sacrifices her life during the battle against Lucas' hybrids in Imortal by exploding a hand grenade.
- Lucille Zaragoza is played by Vivian Velez. She is the former head guardian, who succeeds Lyka. She is Clarisse's mother and villain in Imortal until she realizes her mistakes and fights alongside Mateo and Lia in the big battle against Magnus and the Hybrids. Although fatally wounded by Magnus, she successfully kills him.
- Olive Marquez is portrayed by Marlann Flores. She is the love interest of Gael and Jethro. Jethro is her first love until she meets Gael who transforms her into a vampire. She is torn between her vampire life and her mortal life. She helps Jethro and the others understand that good vampires exist. She fights alongside Mateo and Lia in the last battle against the Hybrids.
- Lucas Ungson Teodoro is portrayed by Rico Blanco. He is Mateo's adoptive brother, in love with Lia but she loves Mateo. His father is Simon, founder of Simon Landholding's Inc. His mother is a powerless werewolf. Lucas does not manifest any werewolf powers himself. However, he is subsequently bitten by Magnus and turns into a hybrid because of his werewolf blood. He is the real monster referred to in both Barang and Jethro's prophecies, and killed by Mateo and Lia in the Imortal finale.
