= List of Imortal episodes =

The following is a list of episodes of the ABS-CBN fantaserye program Imortal, starring Angel Locsin and John Lloyd Cruz under the direction of Chito S. Roño, Jerry Lopez Sineneng, and Trina N. Dayrit. The show serves as a sequel to the 2008 fantasy series Lobo, which also stars Locsin alongside Piolo Pascual.

== Episode list ==
=== Season 1 ===
No.	Title	Original release date
1	"The Arrival of the Vampires"	October 4, 2010
In the Year 1572, vampires invade the Philippines, but when the equally powerful werewolves prevent the vampires from feeding on humans, the conflict between the superhuman clans begin. In the Year 1800, Magnus (Jake Roxas) converts Roman (Jomari Yllana) into a vampire like him, but Roman opposes Magnus' crusade against the werewolves. He sets up a vampire community who do not kill humans and feed on animal blood instead. The vampire seer Barang (Kalila Aguilos) predicts that Magnus will be the father of their clan's prophesied savior. A hundred years are about to pass, and while a desperate Magnus randomly bites a pregnant woman's neck to create the savior child, another human named Ceres (Precious Lara Quigaman) gives birth to Roman's own son. It is the first birth of a union between a vampire and a human. The young boy is raised in the vampire community. Meanwhile, Lyka (Angel Locsin) gives birth to her and Noah's (Piolo Pascual) daughter. Five years later the vampires launch an unexpected attack killing Noah and the rest of Lyka's family.
2	"Attempted Alliance"	October 5, 2010
Following the vampire's unexpected attack on Noah, young Abraham (Epi Quizon) urges Lyka to fulfill her duty as Head Guardian and wage war against their mortal enemies. Lyka, however, opts to give up her title to Lucille (Sheree) and to be a mother to Lia instead. Meanwhile, seeing Mateo's (Bugoy Cariño) keen intellect and growing interest in the city life, Roman thinks of negotiating with the werewolves to reach a compromise between their clans. He is hopeful to give his son the education and chance to live freely. On the day of Mateo and Lia's birthday, Roman pays Lyka a visit. Lyka rejects Roman's pleas, yet she is intrigued and follows him to their hideout.
3	"The First Meeting"	October 6, 2010
Abraham and Lucille grill Lyka about the vampires' hideout, but Lyka reasons that she lost sight of Roman. Praying for her Father’s life, the child Lia ventures into the forest alone. There she meets Mateo. Roman secretly watches as Lia and Mateo become friends. When Lyka learns of these, she invites Roman over at her house to talk things through. Determined to hear Roman’s proposal, Lyka defends Roman from her fellow werewolves. Before a temporary truce is established, Magnus arrives with an army of vampires.
4	"The Passing of Lyka Ortega"	October 7, 2010
Magnus’ vampires slay many werewolves. Lyka saves Lia and takes Magnus' deadly bite. Magnus witnesses the prophecy unfold as the dying Lyka places her eternal protection on Lia. When Roman tries to carry Lia into safety, his hands get burned. After the werewolf army arrives, Lucille uses the massacre and accuses Lyka of conniving with the vampires. With Lyka dead, Lucille casts all punishment on Lia, stripping her of her status in the werewolf hierarchy. Meanwhile, after leaving Mateo in the city alone, Roman returns to their community. Finding it ransacked and Badong dead, Roman breaks his abstinence from fighting werewolves.
5	"Harsh Realities"	October 8, 2010
Accused of treachery against their species, the Waya Council of Elders deny Lyka the privilege of being buried in their clans' Heroes' Cemetery. Impressed with young Mateo's superhuman strength, young Simon (Matthew Mendoza) adopts him. While Mateo (John Lloyd Cruz) grows up with his brother, Lucas, Simon’s natural son, Lia (Angel Locsin) becomes Lucille’s daughter Clarisse' (Niña Dolino) lowly secretary. Mateo and Lia cross paths, and their respective identifying birthmarks glow the moment they stare at each other.
6	"Meet Samantha Imperial"	October 11, 2010
Lia defends her mother's name as she faces Lucille (Vivian Velez) during the annual gathering of the Wayas. Meanwhile, a business minded Mateo is determined to penetrate the Waya Inc., especially now that Simon (Johnny Revilla) offers him a reward he can not pass up. Samantha, (Maricar Reyes) Magnus' daughter, is now a young woman and ready to carry out the revenge of the vampires.
7	"Danger at the Party"	October 12, 2010
Expecting to charm his way with Clarisse to do a merger of his father’s company with Waya, Mateo is dismayed at meeting Lia. During Clarisse's lavish birthday party, Mateo and Lia experience a strange feeling when they touched, while Lucas (Rico Blanco) unexpectedly meets the famous Samantha. A commotion happens as the attendees of the party panic due to a sudden explosion, causing a fire.
8	"Passing out"	October 13, 2010
Mateo passes out in the middle of the fire after blood gushes from his ears. As Lia struggles to search for a way out with Mateo, she comes across Lyndon (Carlos Morales), one of the vampires who killed her mother.
9	"Lucille's Agenda"	October 14, 2010
Certain that vampires caused the fire that endangered the lives of the werewolves, Lia report this to the Waya council. But instead of listening to her suspicions, Lucille puts the blame on Lia and orders to seize her. Unknown to all, Lucille has a secret agreement that involves the continued existence of vampires.
10	"Hidden Feelings"	October 15, 2010
Abraham (Jaime Fabregas), Lia’s guardian, pleads with her to distance herself from Lucille's wrath. Meanwhile, Lia's perception of Mateo as a good man vanishes as he bombards poor Lia with hurtful words.
11	"A Vampire Investigation"	October 18, 2010
Magnus orders Tom (Rocky Salumbides) to gather information about the werewolves' investigations on the fire Samantha started. Meanwhile, Samantha attempts to hypnotize Lucas and fails when Mateo suddenly interrupts. Upon learning that a Werewolf spotted Lyndon during the fire, Samantha punishes him for his recklessness.
12	"The Search for Lia"	October 19, 2010
After witnessing Lia's powers, Clarisse brings her before the Waya council and forces her to show the strength she has acquired. Positive that Lia is an incapable Werewolf, Lucille doubts Clarisse's claims. While wearing her enchanted perfume, Samantha gets through the Waya Inc. building, searching for Lyka's daughter.
13	"Samantha's Aim"	October 20, 2010
Samantha aims to learn about the whereabouts of Lia and the Waya's suspicions on who started the fire as she chats with Clarisse.
14	"Strange Occurrences"	October 21, 2010
A perplexing dream prompts Lia's curiosity to search for an explanation regarding Mateo's unusual medical condition. As she conducts her research, Lia discovers mysterious blogs written based on her encounters with Mateo. Meanwhile, Mateo's quest to unravel the mystery behind his unlikely condition brings him to Samantha.
15	"The Mysterious Blogger"	October 22, 2010
Samantha faces an inner battle against herself as she becomes aware of the possibility that Mateo can snatch her claim as the chosen vampire who will save her kin from the werewolves. Meanwhile, Mateo finally convinces Clarisse to persuade her mother, Lucille, to do the merger between their companies. Lia, on the other hand, is still oblivious of the identity of the mysterious blogger.
16	"Mateo's Secret"	October 25, 2010
After discovering Lia's connection with Lucas and Mateo, Lucille urges Albert (Manuel Aquino) to conduct a thorough investigation on the Teodoros, including Mateo and Simon Land Holdings. Meanwhile, Samantha finally reveals to Mateo that she experienced the same ordeal that he is undergoing.
17	"Jethro the Seer"	October 26, 2010
After a long search, Lia finally finds Jethro (Dino Imperial). During her unprecedented encounter with the blogger, Lia discovers another looming danger that is bound to happen to Mateo. Meanwhile, Samantha begins to discover the superior abilities that Mateo possesses.
18	"The Warning"	October 27, 2010
Lia warns Mateo about Jethro's prediction.
19	"Mateo's Feelings"	October 28, 2010
Mateo becomes Lia's knight-in-shining-armor when he saves her from the insults of Clarisse and Lucille. By doing so, he unintentionally ignites Simon's anger and jeopardizes his future of becoming the vice president of Simon Land Holdings.
20	"Mateo's Fate"	October 29, 2010
After discovering Samantha's secret about Mateo, Lyndon decides to do what he thinks is right — take Mateo to the powerful Magnus. Meanwhile, Lia becomes even more determined to save Mateo from a forthcoming danger. Despite their effort to dismiss the inexplicable fervor they feel for each other, Lia and Mateo still find themselves struggling to cut the invisible rope that draws them closer.
21	"The First Transformation"	November 1, 2010
Lia follows Mateo to Bright Lives Foundation and watches over him. Upon seeing Lyndon dragging Mateo away, Lia tries to protect Mateo. Unfortunately, Lyndon only throws her away so he can beat up Mateo. Tom appears into the scene to stop Lyndon from battering Mateo. When Lia regains her strength, she gradually transforms into a Werewolf and fights the two. But as her opponents leave, Lia, who is still in the form of a Werewolf, stands in front of Mateo and growls at him with her deadly fangs.
22	"Abraham's Plan"	November 2, 2010
Mateo did not tell anyone about his encounter with vampires as well as with the Werewolf. Meanwhile, Tom reports to Samantha that he had an encounter with Lyka's daughter. With Lia's uncontrollable power as a Werewolf, Abraham promises her that he will train her in handling this power. In a conversation with Lia about her kiss from Mateo, Mirriam (Erika Padilla) gets worried about what will happen to Lia and Mateo's relationship in the future.
23	"Lia's Feelings"	November 3, 2010
As she finds out that Lia followed Mateo in the charity, Clarisse reminds Lia that Mateo only belongs to her. With her anger, Lia's eyes initially change in to the eyes of a Werewolf. Meanwhile Mateo cannot get the Vampires and the Werewolves out of his head, So he shows his research of these creatures to Lia. Upon leaving Mateo in their lunch date, Lia hurtfully admits to Mirriam that she is falling in love with Mateo in spite the dangers that they face whenever they are together.
24	"Lia's Training"	November 4, 2010
While Samantha gives Mateo an ill description of werewolves, Clarisse maligns Lia to Mateo. Furious with how Mateo defends Lia, Clarisse bribes Simon. Benjamin, a newly-converted vampire, kills his whole family. As Samantha goes to Benjamin's house to get rid of the bodies, werewolves arrive. Meanwhile, Lia undergoes her first training session with Abraham.
25	"Clarisse's Jealousy"	November 5, 2010
Mateo denies Dara's (Beverly Salviejo) allegations that he has fallen for Lia. Later, Mateo wonders why he is still capable of hearing Dara despite their distance. Meanwhile, Lucille prohibits Clarisse from using their company just to get Mateo. Furious, Clarisse takes the matter in her own hands and lures Lia to an abandoned building. Transformed as a werewolf, Clarisse attacks Lia.
26	"Finding Lia"	November 8, 2010
While Clarisse boasts to Lucille that she has fixed her problem, Lia watches her wounds heal by themselves. Later, Lucas steals a kiss from Lia. Meanwhile, Samantha hypnotizes a doctor to make Mateo believe that they suffer from the same kind of disease. Later that night, Mateo introduces Clarisse to Samantha. With the prophecy in mind, Samantha mischievously extends her hands to Clarisse.
27	"Samantha's Plan"	November 9, 2010
Determined to redeem Lyka's dignity, Lia trains hard with Abraham and Miriam. Dissatisfied with Lia's performance, a fellow werewolf tells Abraham that Lia might be lying. Meanwhile, Samantha comes up with a plan to test if Clarisse is the prophesied savior of the werewolves. Billy (Danilo Barrios) and Francis (Kris Martinez) attack Clarisse and Mateo. Irritated with Mateo's meddling, Billy strangles Mateo and motions to bite the latter's neck.
28	"Bitter Rivals"	November 10, 2010
Simon goes to Lia's house and bribes her to quit seducing Mateo and Lucas. Moments after Simon's departure, Mateo arrives at Lia's house. Lucas sees Lia and Mateo in a compromising position. Wanting to vent his anger, Lucas takes Mateo to an underground boxing match. Meanwhile, Clarisse discovers Lucille's dark secret about the vampires.
29	"Walk out at Simon's Party"	November 11, 2010
Lucas vents his anger on the oblivious Mateo through an underground boxing match. At the anniversary party of Simon Landholdings, Simon shames Lia. Despite Lia's resistance, Mateo takes her by the hand and they leave the party together. While a desperate Clarisse blackmails Lucille so she could get Mateo back, Mateo and Lia share a passionate night by the sea.
30	"Lia's Lineage"	November 12, 2010
Pleased with Mateo's promises, Lia agrees to be Mateo's girl. Jethro awakens the moment Lia and Mateo kiss. Simon threatens Mateo that he will make Lia suffer should Mateo refuse to marry Clarisse. While Mateo argues with Simon, armed men arrest Lia. In exchange for Lia's freedom, Mateo gives up his own as he submits to Simon's demand.
31	"The Strength of Lia"	November 15, 2010
Lia's heart is broken upon witnessing Clarisse announcing in front of everyone that she is already engaged with Mateo. In spite the pain, Lia courageously asks Mateo on his decision about marrying Clarisse. Mateo does not answer, further infuriating Lia. Dara tries to warn Mateo that marrying Clarisse will be the biggest mistake of his life.
32	"Lucas' Anger"	November 16, 2010
Since Lia can now transform into a Werewolf, she finally gains the courage to fight Clarisse. Meanwhile, Samantha brings Mateo to Arturo (Archie Alemania) so that they can discuss the history of Werewolves and Vampires to him. During the discussion, Samantha tries to convince Mateo that the vampires are his allies and not his enemies. Upon seeing Lia talking to Lucas, Mateo joins a fight club and lets his opponent beat him up. When Lia sees this, she pleads Mateo to stop the fight.
33	"Lia's Humiliation"	November 17, 2010
In Mateo and Clarisse's engagement party, Lia grants Clarisse's request and congratulates the couple in front of many people. As Samantha reaches the venue, she bumps into Lia whom she has mistaken for Lyka, Meanwhile, in the contract signing of Simon Land Holdings and Waya Inc. merger, Mateo is forced to sign the contract stating that it will be invalidated if his marriage with Clarisse will be called off.
34	"Controlled Powers"	November 18, 2010
Mateo answers Clarisse's friends questions on why he is marrying her. He reveals that their marriage is part of their families' business contract. When Mateo visits Dara, he asks her to find a safe place for Lia. Simon reprimands Mateo for his inappropriate actions. As a result of Lia's training with Abraham, she finally controls her powers as a Werewolf.
35	"Lia Transforms"	November 19, 2010
Lia gets better with sensing her enemies and transforming into a Werewolf. In school, Jethro collapses as he starts seeing images of a Werewolf, While planning their next move to find Lia, Magnus tells Samantha that she should not be the one in charge of spying over Mateo anymore. As Lia reads Jethro's blogs about his predictions, she starts analyzing what this is all about.
36	"Jethro's Vision"	November 22, 2010
In spite of Lucas' efforts to earn his father's trust, Simon still refuses to believe in his son's capability to handle their business. Lia senses that Jethro's prediction about Mateo falling into a manhole might happen any time, so she stops along the street and covers a manhole. Meanwhile, Mateo is busy running after a truck which contains his chair for Lia. Just in time, Lia covers up the manhole where Mateo is supposed to fall. Since Lia is blocking Mateo's way, he accidentally bumps into her. With Macoy's (Gerhard Acao) help, Mateo successfully gets his chair back. While in a drinking session, Baldo (Zeppi Borromeo) suggests Mateo that he can use his skills in assembling chairs and use his savings to open up a business.
37	"Mateo's Challenge"	November 23, 2010
Upon finding the right time to break into Lucille's office, Lia implants a listening device under Lucille's desk. When Lia meets Jethro, she finally explains what he sees in his predictions. Since Clarisse keeps on forcing herself on Mateo, he challenges her to accept that when they get married, they will be residing in Dara's place.
38	"Mateo's Decision"	November 24, 2010
When Lia finally meets up with Jethro, she explains the nature of the werewolves to him. In a bridal shop, Lia walks out upon seeing Clarisse and Mateo in their wedding apparel. As she hides away from Mateo, Lia sees him talking to Macoy's group. With this, Lia angrily asks Mateo on what this is all about. Though Mateo tries to explain why he hired Macoy to spy on her, Lia refuses to listen to his explanations. In her office, Lucille finds a listening device under her table and suspects Lia of placing it in her office. So, Lucille tells Albert to arrest Lia.
39	"The Escape"	November 25, 2010
While hiding from Albert and his men, Lia hears Albert's plan to kidnap Mateo to make her surrender. With this, Lia fetches Mateo and runs away with him to a place where Lucille and her men cannot find them. With Lucille's suspicion that Lia placed a bug on her office to spy on her, Lucille tells Albert to go after Lia and Abraham. Seeing Clarisse throwing a fit over Mateo’s rejection, Lucille tells her daughter that it is impossible for Mateo to love her.
40	"Lucille's Plan"	November 26, 2010
Seeing Mateo in deep sleep, Lia transforms into a Werewolf and goes to Abraham's house to see if they are fine. Abraham reprimands her for this and tells her to leave immediately. As Lia returns to the province, a human child sees her in the form of a Werewolf. Meanwhile, Samantha is busy fishing out information on where she can find Mateo and Lia. When Lucille's company backs out from the contract of merging with his company, Simon suffers a heart attack. Still arguing on what to do with their situation, Lia grabs Mateo's cellphone to dial Clarisse's number.
41	"Love finally gives in"	November 29, 2010
Lucas, Clarisse, and Samantha seek Dara's help in finding Mateo. While Lucas and Clarisse fail to get information from Dara, Samantha hypnotizes the latter into spilling Mateo's whereabouts. Albert's men eavesdrops on Samantha and Dara. Meanwhile, Lia finally returns Mateo's affection. However, when Lia hears Mateo give a human child an ill description of werewolves, Lia decides to tell Mateo her real identity.
42	"Face off"	November 30, 2010
Samantha gets in the way of Albert and Clarisse' search for Lia and Mateo. While two werewolves hunt Samantha down, Clarisse proceeds to finding Lia and Mateo's alleged hideout. That night, at the forest, Mateo watches helplessly as Lia and Clarisse, transformed into werewolves, face off.
43	"Mateo's Acceptance"	December 1, 2010
Samantha discovers that Mateo is hiding with a lady named Lia. When Magnus learns that the werewolves are also after Mateo, Magnus thinks that Lia is their key to finding the werewolves' prophesied savior. Later, Samantha admits to Magnus her affection for Mateo, but Magnus threatens to kill Mateo if Samantha insists on pursuing him. Meanwhile, Mateo learns to accept Lia's true identity.
44	"Lia's family has been captured"	December 2, 2010
Now that Abraham has been captured, Lucille wastes no time in interrogating him and pressing him to divulge Lia's whereabouts. Meanwhile, Lia and Mateo are still in hiding but for how long?
45	"Samantha meets Lia"	December 3, 2010
Lucille is tightening her grip on the Waya Council now that she has removed Abraham out of the picture. Meanwhile, Mateo and Lia return to Metro Manila and find themselves in a game of cat and mouse with Lucille and her men.
46	"Samantha's Plot"	December 6, 2010
Mateo visits Simon in the hospital to see his adoptive father's condition. Meanwhile, Lia senses someone spying on her. So, Lia fights with the vampire who turns out to be Samantha. Since Samantha is the prophesied savior of the vampires, her skin shall not burn the moment gets in contact with Lia's paws. Contrary to this, Samantha's skin gets burned during her fight with Lia.
47	"Lucille's Plot"	December 7, 2010
Lia and Mateo set out to rescue Miriam from the Rogue Werewolves who have taken her. As Lia and Mateo infiltrate the Rogue Waya hideout, they uncover Lucille's plot to overthrow the Waya Council.
48	"Tag Team"	December 8, 2010
Mateo, Lia and Miriam successfully make their way out of Lucille's hideout with a pile of evidence to expose Lucille's covert activities and plot. Meanwhile, Samantha reveals her true feelings for Mateo and is not pleased when she hears what Mateo has to say about it
49	"Samantha's Belief"	December 9, 2010
Trouble is brewing for Lucille as Lia exposes her treachery and coup plot to the entire Waya Council. Meanwhile, Samantha believes Mateo could be the real chosen vampire Magnus is looking for but decides not to tell Magnus out of spite.
50	"Tables Turned"	December 10, 2010
Now that everything is back as it was, Mateo and Lia try to live out normal lives and do what normal couples do: go out on a date. Meanwhile, Samantha plans to find a new Seer to help shed some light about the "Chosen" and the Prophecy. She also plans to turn Mateo into a vampire.
51	"The Trial"	December 13, 2010
Lucille is presented before the Waya Council to answer for her atrocities but her allies at the council won't make things easy for Lia.
52	"The First Date"	December 14, 2010
Mateo and Lia go on a date for the first time.
53	"The Werewolves' Panics"	December 15, 2010
Panic spreads in the Waya Community after Lucille reveals that the vampires have returned and creates a lie that the Waya Council is preventing her from dealing with their threat. Meanwhile, Lia tries to convince Jethro to help the waya defeat the monsters by serving as their guide.
54	"War Preparations"	December 16, 2010
Abraham and the Waya Council face their people and confirm that the vampires have returned. Meanwhile, Magnus finds himself trying to quell a mutiny within the vampires' ranks after he reveals that Samantha is not the prophesied "chosen" of the vampires.
55	"The Tension of Races"	December 17, 2010
Werewolves, Vampires and Humans are all on the edge as the tension between the races intensifies. The mounting tension is starting to spill into Mateo and Lia's relationship and bring foreboding visions of the future to Jethro.
56	"Rescue Jethro"	December 20, 2010
Jethro becomes the vampires' next target when Arturo finds out that he is a Seer. Lia tries to rescue Jethro from Arturo but finds herself outnumbered by Arturo's gang of vampires.
57	"The Prophecy"	December 21, 2010
The Vampires are getting bolder and decide to launch simultaneous attacks around the country to divide the wayas and weaken them. Meanwhile, Abraham takes in Jethro and his father Enrico (Leandro Baldemore) under the werewolves' protection and promises to train him to use his powers as a Seer.
58	"The Chosen Vampire"	December 22, 2010
Samantha is now certain that Mateo is the prophesied chosen" of the vampires but is unsure if she should tell Magnus about it. Meanwhile, Jethro's vision sheds light about the prophecy and Lia's role in the forthcoming battle between werewolves and vampires.
59	"Tom's Plot"	December 23, 2010
Lia proves her worth as the chosen werewolf after she defeats the vampire Severina (Kristel Moreno) in front of the Waya Council. Meanwhile, Tom abducts Mateo to turn him into a vampire.
60	"Samantha's secret revealed"	December 24, 2010
Samantha accidentally kills Tom after he decides to make a vampire out of Mateo. Mateo reacts with fear and revulsion over discovering Samantha's real identity.
61	"The Haunting"	December 27, 2010
The Waya Council decide to include Lia to the "ESALAFUSINIS"; an elite special force of powerful werewolf soldiers who were expert professionals in fighting the vampires. Meanwhile Samantha releases Mateo from her house. He chooses not to tell Lia the truth about Samantha.
62	"Protect Lia"	December 28, 2010
Ricardo (Leo Gamboa) welcomes Lia to the "ESALAFUSINIS", and he informs them of their mission; to hunt down the vampires' chosen one, and protect Lia, up until the two face each other in battle. Meanwhile Jethro encounters a shocking premonition about Mateo.
63	"Another Vision"	December 29, 2010
Samantha tells a lie to Magnus that Tom is killed by the werewolves, to which the vampires reply with a surprise attack against Lia and the others.
64	"Lia's hardships"	December 30, 2010
Seeing his daughter Samantha imprisoned for treachery, Magnus places her interests above their race, and secretly releases her. Lia lays her life on the line after she saves Vergara (Carlos Agassi) from an assaulting vampire.
65	"Hunt down Samantha"	December 31, 2010
Mateo confronts Samantha for all the peculiar symptoms he is exhibiting, since getting himself bit by Tom. Arturo accuses Magnus of helping Samantha escape.
66	"Mateo's Origins"	January 3, 2011
Samantha gets rescued by Lydia (Nikki Valdez) and her peace-keeping tribe of vampires, and tries to sway the survivor in living by their ways. During her stay with the animal blood-drinkers, Samantha learns to Lydia the truth about Mateo. Meanwhile, Mateo's sudden odd actions and Lia's responsibilities keep them apart.
67	"Lia's Suspicions"	January 4, 2011
Troubled by Mateo not showing up to their planned date, Lia pays the man a visit, seeing Samantha with Mateo in his room. Lia notices how Samantha rapidly heals from an accidental cut from Baldo’s tool. Meanwhile, Magnus learns the truth about Mateo through his minions.
68	"Confrontation of the Past"	January 5, 2011
Mateo refuses to believe Lydia and Samantha's revelation of his lineage. Lia stands by her faith despite the message that Mateo's actions and their friends' words imply.
69	"Mateo's Test"	January 6, 2011
Mateo gains the strength to fight the vampires who chase him, reminded by his and Lia's vows that they will never be apart. Lia arrives to save Mateo from Magnus and his men. Jethro recalls his premonition about the prophecy, and Mateo turning into a vampire.
70	"Mateo's Doubts"	January 7, 2011
The lunar eclipse comes fast, and both vampires and wewrewolves prepare for its coming. Mateo begins to consider his role in the prophecy as the chosen vampire, Lia's mortal enemy. Lia hears of this through Arturo, as the vampire loses their fight.
71	"Love VS. Prophecy"	January 10, 2011
Lia learns the truth about Mateo, but the lovers decide to stand by their vows and lean away from their fate. Meanwhile Lucas learns the truth about the blood of a Werewolf in himself.
72	"Jetro's Confrontation"	January 11, 2011
Jethro sees a vision about Mateo's true identity, a fact that Lia pleads the boy to keep to himself. Clarisse returns to the country with a plan to save her mother Lucille. Lia's hopes to get help from Abraham gets shattered as she learns of the man's conviction to kill the chosen vampire, regardless of his identity and race.
73	"Lia's Guts"	January 12, 2011
Magnus holds Olive (Marlann Flores) captive and orders Mateo to come for her alone. Clarisse reunites with her mother as she succeeds with her plans to break Lucille away from prison.
74	"Lia becomes a Head Guardian"	January 13, 2011
The tribe of the Werewolves gets alarmed with the news about Lucille's prison break. The need for new governance was felt, and as the chosen one, Lia was elected as their new Head Guardian. Mateo leaves in the middle of Lia's induction.
75	"Mateo's Path"	January 14, 2011
Lia continues her search for Mateo, who has decided to leave for the safety of his loved ones. The worried lover confronts her rival, Samantha, who defends herself and her clan from Lia's one-sided opinion about vampires. Meanwhile Mateo learns of the suspicious man's identity, who is secretly watching Lia's induction as Head Guardian, an important person in Lia's life.
76	"Mateo's Resolve"	January 17, 2011
Lucas reveals to Lia his knowledge about his true identity and of hers. Despite Imelda's (Francine Prieto) manipulation, Mateo fights the urge to be a monster and remains by his humanity, with Julio (Mark Gil) as a witness. Mateo returns to Lia, with a decision that would bind them together, as husband and wife.
77	"Mateo's Anger"	January 18, 2011
Magnus decides to act on the prophecy and make Mateo one of them. Miriam learns about Lia and Mateo's engagement and greatly disapproves. Lia convenes the Waya council as the new Head Guardian.
78	"The Revelation"	January 19, 2011
Abraham discovers the truth about Mateo, but his concern for Lia prompts him to keep it to himself. Samantha learns about Magnus' condition after biting Mateo.
79	"Abraham's Decision"	January 20, 2011
Lia earns Abraham's favor for Mateo as her lover. But just to make sure, Abraham commissions Jethro to keep an eye on Mateo. Lia learns through Mateo about the light of hope they have, with his blood bringing poison to vampires.
80	"Magnus' Secret"	January 21, 2011
Magnus learns about his daughter's role in the realization of the prophecy. Samantha receives a call from an unknown man, tipping her off of her father's secret - Roman's grave.
81	"Lucas' Discovery"	January 24, 2011
Samantha brings Roman's rotting body to Lydia, and Magnus watches from afar. Meanwhile, Olive's unnatural actions begin to see light with Jethro's visions. Lucas discovers Mateo true identity. Hoping to save Lia from herself and the danger she faces, Lucas shares his information with Lucille.
82	"Preparations for Marriage"	January 25, 2011
Friends and family gather as the day Mateo and Lia's matrimony finally arrive.
83	"The Judgment"	January 26, 2011
Samantha breaks in tears as the love of her life weds the woman of his. As Mateo proclaim their love and vows, Lucille arrives to object.
84	"Planning for Execution"	January 27, 2011
Lia chooses to stand by her faith in and love in Mateo. As a consequence, the Head Guardian finds herself helpless behind bars. The Waya reach a verdict about Lia, Abraham and Mateo's fate.
85	"Plans for Mateo's Rescue"	January 28, 2011
Lucas, Simon and Clarisse try to save Mateo from his impending death but fail. Lia's pleas for help are answered by Miriam who brings her the key to her chains. Meanwhile Samantha learns about Mateo's execution and quickly runs to Lydia and Magnus for help.
86	"Trouble in the Headquarters"	January 31, 2011
Lia stops the execution just in time, but as soon as Lia frees Mateo, the vampires storm the Waya Headquarters and begin a riot to save Mateo. Lia and Mateo battle their way out of the headquarters and successfully escape. Samantha notices them and covertly follows. She then tricks Lia and Mateo into believing that she is on their side, but then betrays Lia and knocks Mateo unconscious to bring him back to Roman's Civilization.
87	"The Return of Lucille"	February 1, 2011
Abraham, his family, and Lia are branded as deserters because of what happened at the headquarters. Because of this, Abraham is forced to move his family and leave the Philippines while Lia insists on staying behind to find Mateo. Meanwhile, the Waya Council struggle to decide whether to re-elect Lucille to her position as the Guardian of the werewolves, as werewolf civilians are protesting for the re-establishment of Lucille.
88	"Family Reunion"	February 2, 2011
Mateo is reunited with his father Roman, and Roman asks for his son's forgiveness. Mateo forgives him and returns to the Civilization. Meanwhile, Lia is still trying to find Mateo and seeks Jethro's help. She asks him to use his abilities to find Mateo, but this is difficult as Jethro is being watched by Lucille's men. Lucille, knowing that Jethro is still loyal to Lia, orders her men to capture and arrest Olive.
89	"Fated Meeting"	February 3, 2011
Lia and Mateo learn from Jethro and Dara respectively that Olive has been captured by Lucille. They launch separate rescue attempts, neither realising the other's intentions. Mateo goes with Roman and Samantha while Lia goes on her own. Roman becomes separated from Mateo and Samantha and runs into Lia, who still believes that he is the vampire who killed her mother. She attacks Roman in a rage, but before she can finish Roman she is captured by Lucille's subordinates and sent to prison.
90	"Lia stands tall"	February 4, 2011
Roman finds it difficult to decide whether to tell Mateo about what happened during the death of Lia's mother Lyka. Meanwhile, Lucille sees everything that happened outside during the rescue attempts, as the events have been recorded by her security cameras. She decides to free Lia and use her and Jethro to capture Roman for her own sake so he can imprison Lia and Olive again, but she is surprised when her plans backfire, with soldiers she trusted declaring a loyalty to Lia, and pointing their guns at her and her daughter Clarisse.
91	"Trouble at the Civilization"	February 7, 2011
Lucille is surprised at her soldiers' betrayal. It is revealed that before Lia was captured, she and Vergara (the Leader of the Werewolf Elite Soldiers) planned the whole thing. The soldiers handcuff Lucille and Clarisse, along with Lucille's followers. After Olive has been rescued, Lia proceeds to the location where Mateo is being held. However, Lucille's followers escape and also proceed to Roman's Civilization, with the intention of capturing Roman alive. Meanwhile, Roman is about tell Mateo the truth about Lyka's death when Lucille's followers attack their civilization. They are about to confront their attackers when they are stopped by Magnus, and he reveals that it was he who told the werewolves about Mateo's location. Roman and Magnus fight each other, but before Roman can rescue Mateo, Magnus throws a knife at his neck, paralysing him. He then gets captured by the werewolves while Magnus kidnaps Mateo. Samantha also learns from Magnus that she is the bite of pure love referred to in the third part of the prophecy. Lia was expecting to find Mateo, but only finds the necklace she had given him.
92	"Lucille's Challenge"	February 8, 2011
After the incident, Samantha, Lydia and the vampire survivors travel again to find a new hideout. Mateo is being kept in Magnus' lair and Roman is being held in prison. Lucille tries to interrogate Roman about Mateo and learns that he is Mateo's father, and upon learning this she decides to execute Roman and challenges Lia to come to the execution to kill Roman herself in exchange for her freedom. Lucille knows the anger that Lia holds towards Roman. Meanwhile, at Magnus' lair, Mateo also hears the news about his father's execution and tries to convince Magnus to help him, but he refuses.
93	"Lia's Choice"	February 9, 2011
Mateo escapes from Magnus' lair to rescue Roman. Lia attempts to investigate the coming execution, but she is discovered by one of the werewolves. Lucille offers Lia the opportunity to kill Roman herself, knowing that Mateo will hate Lia for killing Roman. Meanwhile, Mateo arrives at the place where his father is being executed only to see Lia about to kill his father. He tries to stop Lia but is prevented from doing so by the werewolf soldiers. However, instead of killing Roman, Lia decides to let Roman live, as she does not want to end up like him. As soon as she makes her choice, Mateo's infiltration alerts all the Werewolves, and Lia runs as fast as she can to rescue Mateo despite the soldiers firing their guns to stop her.
94	"The Death of Mateo"	February 10, 2011
Lia tries to rescue Mateo, but she fails as she is being shot at by the soldiers. As both Mateo and Lia are weakening, Samantha and Lydia order the soldiers to stop. They order that Mateo be brought to a safe place, whilst Lucas takes Lia to the ambulance. Mateo tells Samantha that he wants to become a vampire, but as soon as Samantha makes him a vampire Mateo dies instantly. While Lucas removes the silver bullets in Lia's back, Mateo appears to Lia as a ghost in a dream and says goodbye. Meanwhile, back at the execution, Lucille receives the report of Mateo's death and informs Roman. He suddenly becomes enraged and tells Lucille that she is viler than an animal. He swears to Lucille that he will be back, and one day it will be Lucille being judged and executed. Lucille then kills Roman. At the Civilization, Mateo's body is being prepared for burial. They believe it was Lia who killed Roman.
95	"Mateo's Funeral"	February 11, 2011
News of Mateo's death spreads across the Internet and the werewolves celebrate their victory. Lucille orders her subordinates to find Mateo's body as proof of his death. Meanwhile, Lia awakens after recovering from her injuries and tries to find Mateo. She asks Jethro to find Mateo's body. She eventually finds Mateo's body in a forest where Samantha is about to bury him. Lia carries Mateo to his family, and many of his friends who loved Mateo come to his burial. Lucille's subordinates try to take Mateo's body but Lia threatens them, saying that if they take him she will tell the public about the werewolves and what they did to Mateo, despite knowing that she would be forced to tell the public that she is a werewolf too.
96	"The resurgence of Mateo"	February 14, 2011
The vampires feel that the Prophecy has failed them as Samantha failed to make Mateo into a vampire. They decide to fight for their lives. The werewolves celebrate with a victory party, thinking they have already won the war against the vampires. Lia makes a sudden appearance at the party, intending to kill Lucille in revenge for killing Mateo. However she changes her mind, and decides not to show her face again to the werewolves. Mateo then returns from the dead. He has many questions to answer, including why Lia killed Roman. Samantha lies to him, telling him that Lia killed Roman, sending Mateo into a rage.
97	"Starting a New Life"	February 15, 2011
Mateo goes back to the site of Roman's execution and finds Roman's ashes there. Later, he watches his father's execution on the Internet, seeing that it was Lia who killed him. Meanwhile, Lia has still not fully recovered from the death of Mateo. She decides to move away and start a new life, changing her name to Karen. Lucille orders the werewolves to hunt Lia down.

=== Season 2 ===
No.	Title	Original release date
98	"Mateo's Return"	February 16, 2011
As Lucille's business ventures slowly deteriorate, it is revealed that Mateo planned this as part of his revenge. Meanwhile, Lia is worried about her family and calls them to see if they are all right. Jethro discovers her location. Mateo continues to unleash his wrath on the werewolves.
99	"Waya's Business Tumbles"	February 17, 2011
Lia loses the conviction to fight for what she believes in. Meanwhile, Waya's businesses all crumble. News of this spreads, causing confusion. As Mateo's vengeance continues, he reminisces about his time with Lia.
100	"Mateo's Return"	February 18, 2011
Lia dreams about Mateo's reincarnation. Mateo returns to the Civilization and confronts Samantha, while Lucille tries to rebuild her businesses, with Mateo continuing to hamper her. Mateo reveals himself to the werewolves, causing shock. Lucille realises Mateo is at the heart of her business troubles. Mateo leaves with a threat, and Lucille pursues him.
101	"Mateo and Lia's Reunion"	February 21, 2011
Lucille and her men try to corner Mateo, but he escapes. News of Mateo's return spreads. Meanwhile, Lia reaches the place where the incident happened, but only shows herself to Clarisse to ask after Mateo. Lia follows Mateo's blood trail and finds his empty grave. Mateo then reveals himself to her and declares that he still loves her, but still believing that she killed his father, he moves to kill her in revenge.
102	"Mateo's Woe"	February 22, 2011
Mateo hesitates and does not kill Lia, going away to grieve for his father alone. Meanwhile, all the werewolves are looking for Mateo. Magnus also looks for Mateo, hoping to persuade him to join his cause. Lia learns that Mateo holds her responsible for Roman's death.
103	"Olive is in Peril"	February 23, 2011
Mateo has the chance to become the Chosen Vampire but refuses. Lia learns that she has been set up. At school, Olive is in danger when she is abducted by vampires who offer her to Mateo to drink her blood. Mateo is about to kill Olive when he was interrupted by the arrival of Samantha.
104	"The Murderer of Roman Revealed"	February 24, 2011
Samantha saves Olive just in time. Samantha uses her powers to make Olive forget everything that happened to her at Magnus' lair. Samantha realizes that Mateo's personality has changed greatly and questions herself as to whether she did the right thing in lying to him about Roman's death. Mateo finds Lia sleeping in Lucas' arms, which makes him angry. As Lucas prepares the car to get Lia home, Mateo attacks him. Lia finally gets to tell Mateo that she did not kill his father but Mateo does not believe her. Lia eventually convinces him that Lucille has framed them both.
105	"Aggression in Mateo's Heart"	February 25, 2011
Mateo's revenge continues. Mateo returns to the Civilization and finds that the vampire Jose has been killed by Lucille, and then goes to Lucille's house.
106	"Preparations for The Lunar Eclipse"	February 28, 2011
Mateo brings Lucille and Clarisse to the Civilization and ties them up. The vampires and werewolves gear up for war, but Lia continues to try and persuade Mateo to cease his vengeance.
107	"Samantha's Plea"	March 1, 2011
Samantha tries to find Mateo in the playground where he usually goes, whilst Lia tries to find Mateo through Jethro. Jethro tells Lia where Mateo is. Lia pleads with Mateo to stop.
108	"Battle and Carnage under the Lunar Eclipse"	March 2, 2011
Many werewolves are killed in a battle. Lucille and Clarisse escape. Mateo wonders whether he is doing the right thing. Lia arrives at the safe house. Mr. Cordero wonders how the vampires were able to locate the safe houses. Mateo admits it was he who revealed their location.
109	"The Collapse of the Wayas"	March 3, 2011
Some of the Waya council died in the previous battle. The werewolves intend to hold a meeting with the human government but are betrayed, and now the werewolves find themselves hunted by both humans and the vampires. Lia realises she may have to fight Mateo.
110	"Lia fights back"	March 4, 2011
111	"Plan for Retaliation"	March 7, 2011
112	"The Attack on Magnus' Lair!"	March 8, 2011
113	"Change Beliefs"	March 9, 2011
114	"Lia and Samantha Join Forces"	March 10, 2011
115	"Love Is fragility"	March 11, 2011
116	"The Story of the Abandoned Love"	March 14, 2011
117	"Lia's Sacrifice"	March 15, 2011
118	"The Arising of the New Lia"	March 16, 2011
119	"Mateo's Blueprint for Peace"	March 17, 2011
120	"The Werewolves are on the Move"	March 18, 2011
121	"Mateo's Atonement"	March 21, 2011
122	"The Affectation of Lucas"	March 22, 2011
123	"Forgotten Memories"	March 23, 2011
124	"Trap in a Cave"	March 24, 2011
125	"Alarm of the Vampires"	March 25, 2011
126	"Mateo's Love"	March 28, 2011
127	"Barang's Artifact"	March 29, 2011
128	"Magnus must Pay"	March 30, 2011
129	"A Ruse for Mateo"	March 31, 2011
130	"Lia VS Mateo: Scuffle of the Chosen"	April 1, 2011
131	"The Return of Lia's Memories"	April 4, 2011
132	"Mateo and Roman: Face to Face"	April 5, 2011
133	"Made Promises"	April 6, 2011
134	"The Peace Talks"	April 7, 2011
135	"A New Prediction"	April 8, 2011
136	"Barang's Revelation"	April 11, 2011
137	"The Peace Celebrations"	April 12, 2011
138	"New Problems Arise"	April 13, 2011
139	"Lucas' Ascension"	April 14, 2011
140	"Terrifying Visions"	April 15, 2011
141	"Terror of the Grisly Creature"	April 18, 2011
142	"The Baby's Power"	April 19, 2011
143	"The Revenge of Lucas"	April 20, 2011
144	"The Raid on the ASEAN Summit"	April 25, 2011
145	"Reconnaissance on Lucas"	April 26, 2011
146	"The Death of Samantha"	April 27, 2011
Samantha fights with Lucas who has become a monster. Lucas defeats Samantha and bites her. Without a known cure for Lucas' bite, Samantha opts for a drastic measure to prevent herself from turning into a monster.
147	"The Violence of the Modified Beings"	April 28, 2011
148	"The Final Clash of the Immortal"	April 29, 2011
The werewolves and the vampires finally lives in peace and Mateo and Lia have a daughter.

== Webisodes ==
On the official website of Imortal, a series of five-minute webisodes of the show, entitled The Hidden Chapters of Imortal: Anino't Panaginip are available for streaming.

No.	Title	Original release date
1	"Maestro"	TBA
2	"Conversation with Rizal"	TBA
3	"The Dream"	TBA
4	"Salesman"	TBA
5	"Hikers"	TBA
6	"Lia"	TBA
7	"Superhero"	TBA
8	"Darla"	TBA
9	"Memories 1"	TBA
10	"Memories 2"	TBA
11	"The Monologue"	TBA
12	"Mga Pangitain ni Jethro"	TBA
13	"Chance Encounter 1"	TBA
14	"Chance Encounter 2"	TBA
15	"Outbreak 1"	TBA
16	"Outbreak 2"	TBA
17	"Anghel 1"	TBA
18	"Anghel 2"	TBA
19	"Birthday"	TBA
20	"Lucille 1"	TBA
21	"Lucille 2"	TBA
22	"Urban Legend"	TBA
23	"Kalaro"	TBA
24	"Broken"	TBA
This webisode was included in the official website but was not shown on iWanTV.
25	"Rebirth 1"	TBA
26	"Rebirth 2"	TBA

== See also ==
- List of programs broadcast by ABS-CBN
