= La Luna Sangre =

2017–18 Philippine television drama series

- Title card
- Genre: Fantasy drama; Horror
- Created by: ABS-CBN Studios
- Developed by: ABS-CBN Studios; Malou N. Santos; Des M. De Guzman
- Written by: Adam Cormelius Asin; Mary Pearl Urtola
- Directed by: Jerry Lopez Sineneng; Cathy Garcia-Molina; Richard I. Arellano; Frasco S. Mortiz; Rory B. Quintos; Mae Cruz-Alviar; GB Sampedro (Second Unit); Lester Pimentel (Action); Wang Yanbin (Action)
- Starring: Kathryn Bernardo; Daniel Padilla; Richard Gutierrez; Angel Locsin
- Opening theme: "Ikaw Lang Ang Mamahalin" by KZ Tandingan
- Composer: Francis Concio
- Country of origin: Philippines
- Original language: Filipino
- No. of episodes: 185 (list of episodes)

Production
- Executive producers: Carlo Katigbak; Cory Vidanes; Laurenti Dyogi; Malou Santos
- Producers: Fe Catherine DV Ancheta; Marissa Kalaw; Kristine P. Sioson; Des M. De Guzman
- Production location: Philippines
- Editors: Joshua Ducasen; Mark Angos
- Running time: 20–30 minutes
- Production company: Star Creatives

Original release
- Network: ABS-CBN
- Release: June 19, 2017 – March 2, 2018

Related
- Lobo (2008); Imortal (2010)

La Luna Sangre (transl. the blood moon) is a Philippine television drama fantasy series broadcast by ABS-CBN. The series is the third and final installment of the Moonstone trilogy and the sequel to both Lobo and Imortal. Directed by Jerry Lopez Sineneng, Cathy Garcia-Molina, Richard I. Arellano, Frasco S. Mortiz, Rory Quintos and Mae Cruz-Alviar, it stars Kathryn Bernardo, Daniel Padilla, Richard Gutierrez and Angel Locsin. It aired on the network's Primetime Bida line up and worldwide on TFC from June 19, 2017 to March 2, 2018, replacing My Dear Heart and was replaced by Bagani.

== Plot ==
The prophecy of the Blood Moon is the heart of this fictional series. It is foreshadowed that the child of the most powerful vampire and the chosen werewolf will end the reign of the vampire with the cursed ink ("sumpang tintâ"). The story picks up after the righteous vampires and werewolves' victorious battle against Lucas and his allies. Mateo (John Lloyd Cruz), Lia (Angel Locsin) and Malia Rodriguez (Kathryn Bernardo) are living their lives as powerless mortals in San Isidro, a fictional province of the Philippines. Sandrino (Richard Gutierrez), Magnus' son, also known as Supremo, orders his forces to hunt the Rodriguez family to prevent the prophecy's fulfillment and ensure his ascendancy into power. Malia's bloodline is a threat to Supremo even as a mortal child without powers. Supremo kills Mateo and Lia, unaware that the 7-year-old Malia is carried off to safety at a secret LLU base in Tanay, Rizal by the werewolf Baristo (Joross Gamboa).

=== Act One ===
Malia, a 21-year-old woman when Supremo locates their camp and massacres everyone. Supremo and his vampires replace LLU's business and political influence and assimilate into mainstream society in the metropolis. In the 14 years since the massacre, the peaceful cooperation of the three species established by the LLU organization is gone, werewolves are hiding and humans are in peril once again. Many LLU leaders fled the country. A few remnants find each other in Manila, where Malia meets Tristan (Daniel Padilla), a young man seeking to avenge his father's death by vampires. Tristan joins a secret youth vigilante group called Moonchasers, who track and kill vampires and protect Supremo's targeted victims. Jethro Kabigting (Dino Imperial), the seer, predicts the young couple are fated to be enemies. They grow closer, nonetheless, and Tristan discovers she is not human. They fall in love.

Destroying the Supremo is Malia's entire life's work. Expected by everyone to fulfill the prophecy when she matures, she encounters defeat and disappointments time and again when her powers do not manifest. Undaunted, she persists, is killed and resurrects, and moves forward to fulfill the prophecy as the savior of the three species.

Four characters precipitate Malia's evolution from mortal to supernatural:

There is Supremo, a lonely boy raised by an evil vampire who confers on him the enchantment of the cursed ink. Sandrino grows into an adult consumed with anger, but he weakens when he comes face-to-face with his brother. His desire to experience a real family gets his heart beating again. At the enchanted forest scene, Jacintha chooses not to kill Sandrino, pointing to the cursed ink as the real evil, foreshadowing her true mission.

There is Jacintha Magsaysay, a dead ringer for Lia, the precursor of Malia, whose mission is to facilitate the path for Malia to defeat the Cursed Ink. Jacintha is the political strategist who Gilbert Imperial hires to run his presidential campaign, a vampire and Hybrid secretly working with Samantha to undermine Supremo while they wait for Malia's full powers to emerge.

There is Samantha Imperial, (Maricar Reyes-Poon). She is Magnus' vampire daughter. Sandrino and Tristan are her half-brothers. She provides powerful cover for the LLU and the Moonchasers during their missions against Supremo. Samantha sacrifices her life to protect Jacintha's identity.

And finally, there is Tristan, the Moonchasers’ strongest fighter, a mortal thrown in the midst of the war between vampires and werewolves. He discovers his origins which changes his perspective of the world. Tristan's mortal mother, Rica, is a vampire hunter who falls in love and becomes pregnant by the vampire Magnus. When Magnus is killed, Rica takes refuge with Barang and Magnus’ son Sandrino, but a Luna force led by Tonio Toralba finds them, captures Rica and kills Sandrino. While Barang turns Sandrino into a vampire and raises him towards evil and revenge, Tonio brings the pregnant Rica to the safety of his family and raises Tristan on the path of goodness and righteousness.

The source of Supremo's power is the cursed ink in his arm. Barang's memories lead Jacintha to the enchanted forest where she retrieves the ancient book of spells and learns how to defeat the curse: a beating heart and the First Werewolf's Fang. In his recent visions, Jethro sees Barang inadvertently imprint the cursed ink on Tristan while in Rica's womb. Everyone understands the significance of this detail and is conflicted about protecting or killing him. Sandrino warns Tristan of man's deep hatred and distrust for their kind. Malia remains determined to change his fate, and her decision to protect Tristan at all cost creates doubt within the LLU.

On the night of the Blood Moon, the LLU and Moonchasers overpower Sandrino's forces. Amidst the fighting, Jacintha urges Malia to keep Tristan away but Tristan stubbornly refuses to be kept in the safe house. Jacintha kills Tristan who is bitten by Supremo. She stabs Supremo with the First Werewolf's fang and watches him and the cursed ink disintegrate into ashes. She vanishes into thin air leaving Malia holding Tristan's lifeless body. The mystery of Jacintha remains unexplained, though the LLU believe she is Malia from the future.

=== Act Two ===
Two years pass since the end of the war. Without the cursed ink's protection, Supremo is no longer invincible, but he raises Tristan from his death and turns him into a vampire. Supremo discovers new information about the cursed ink: the first mark grants him protection; the second mark inside Tristan grants unparalleled strength, and whoever possesses both marks gains infinite power. Supremo repeatedly attempts to cast the spell of the two marks on himself but fails. Later he learns he needs to kill his brother to get both marks.

Angry over the tragic circumstances that turn him into a vampire, memories flood Tristan's mind: his fallen comrades, the family he lost and all humans caught in the crossfire of the power struggle between the supernaturals. As Supremo plans their return, Tristan has a different agenda - create a war that annihilates vampires and werewolves and yield the world to humans only. He works with Prof T to reactivate the Moonchasers and prepare for a big war where the werewolves and vampires destroy each other.

Meanwhile, the new order under the Waya Corp has the werewolves back on top. There is a feeling of unease as the National ID System rolls out under a new president sympathetic towards Tristan and Supremo. The system identifies humans and supernaturals, potentially compromising the identities the werewolves have carefully guarded for decades. Although Malia prefers the supernaturals to not participate, she is overruled by her council members who do not take her concerns about the threat of a new war seriously, dismissing her fears as irrelevant. Two traitors in the council, Geneva and Soraya, successfully unseat her from the head guardian position on the basis of a mental breakdown. But soon after a vicious vampire onslaught, Malia's powerful wall of protection proves stronger than Supremo's and Tristan's, and the vampires retreat. Apologizing to Malia, the council acknowledges their misjudgment and restore her to her position. Soraya decides to secretly ally with Supremo to betray the Wayas and Malia.

Malia's new enemy is Soraya Laurent, leader of the black werewolves, another breed of the werewolves species who rebelled against the Waya Council decades ago under Lyka Ortega's guardianship in the Lobo series, a generation before Lia and Mateo's LLU peace agreement was enforced. Certain that Jacintha defeated the cursed ink, the black werewolves plan to take over the predatory might to feed on humans, violating their decades-long vow to protect them. Soraya plots to kill Malia who would never allow this to happen.

Meanwhile, the National ID database begins culling werewolves who registered. Colluding with Supremo, President Osmundo's military forces systematically round up the werewolves and are tortured and killed in undisclosed facilities. Malia's remarkable ability to analyze and accurately assess situations saves the captured werewolves from Osmundo's men. Tristan rushes to the vicinity and tries to prevent a massacre which infuriates Supremo and he begins to doubt Tristan's loyalty.

Supremo's doubts about Tristan increase when his vampire forces are constantly undermined by LLU presence. At the Heroes Ball, the LLU witnesses Tristan and Malia working from opposite forces, protecting the humans from a mass conversion and not a single vampire survives. Soraya confirms Tristan's duplicity to Supremo. Miriam discovers Soraya's alliance with Supremo and alerts the LLU. Malia's astuteness once again brings her to the truth behind Tristan's real intentions and tries to convince him to join forces with her..

=== The Apocalypse (Finale) ===
Supremo declares war on his brother, but he gauges the moment he can distract Tristan to possess the two cursed inks. But without intel from Soraya, Supremo is unaware that Malia and Tristan are allies once again. Nonetheless, he banks on Soraya to immobilize the LLU from within.

Elsewhere, two crucial laboratory experiments reach crossroads. Prof T's research for an anti-vampire serum is at a dead end, but he stumbles upon an ingredient that humans can use as a weapon of mass destruction against the supernaturals. Meanwhile, Lemuel's serum for curing vampires using the pulverized ingredients of the First Werewolf's Fang reaches another dead end. Desperate to change Tristan's mind, Lemuel pretends his formula heals James, a vampire who becomes mortal once again. Unaware of the ruse, Tristan and Malia have renewed hope, he changes his plan to annihilate the supernaturals. Hope gets Tristan's heart beating again, which means his powers are weakened and his cursed mark is vulnerable for Supremo to steal.

Soraya and her black werewolves escape to join Supremo, adding werewolves to replace the vampire horde he lost. They enter the Moonchasers headquarters and kill the unsuspecting Professor Ellie. The first major encounter does not end well for Tristan, Malia and the LLU, the biggest blow being the loss of all the Moonchasers except for Prof T and Hanno. Amid Tristan's face-off with Supremo, Sandrino hears Tristan's heart beating. As Lucho said it would, the cursed ink is drawn to the being who is consumed by hatred. Supremo's hatred wins over Tristan's righteousness and as the cursed ink consumes him, Malia and the LLU escape with Tristan.

Darkness descends on the population as Sandrino and his vampires rule once again, this time alongside Soraya and the Black Lobos. The peace agreement between the three species is destroyed. Humans are systematically harvested for the blood farms or transformed into vampires. Malia's defeat brings Sandrino and Soraya forward as they reclaim their place in the social hierarchy. Gilbert Imperial is appointed Secretary of National Defense, and Osmundo is killed and replaced by President Cecilio, a vampire ally. With not enough time left to save humanity, Malia contemplates time travel as Jacintha did to kill a weaker Sandrino, but Tristan won't allow it, insisting they fight Supremo together in the present. Malia, Tristan and a remnant of their group hide in the safe house to regroup.

After convincing him to abandon his revenge to destroy all the supernaturals with his acid red rain, Malia and Tristan bid goodbye to Prof T and erase his memories of their time together. The Super Moon comes without incident but it has an unusual effect on Supremo. Two distinct beings emerge, the second one totally consumed by hatred, more brutal than the first, and he overpowers the older being altogether. His own vampire allies fear him more when he indiscriminately kills his own vampires.

The new Supremo escalates his force's onslaught of death on the population, taxing the strength and resources of the LLU trying to protect them. Malia suffers the loss of her adoptive father, Baristo while the Supremo takes Tristan's grandparents’ lives for his refusal to kill Malia. Realizing Supremo's ultimate goal to destroy everyone, mortal and supernaturals, Soraya's remaining pack return to the LLU, and Greta kills Soraya in a final face-off. Amidst the grief and loss suffered, Malia's full transformation occurs, becoming a red-caped hybrid werewolf with vampiric characteristics and powers similar to Jacintha.

A new and dark prophecy challenges Malia and Tristan when Jethro sees the penultimate moment before the apocalyptic war where everyone is killed. Similarly, Supremo faces an obstacle as he battles to overcome any remaining good that used to be in his heart. Earlier, Lucho explains that the cursed ink can be defeated by a single act of goodness on Supremo's part, be it compassion or sacrifice. Does this signal a lost cause considering Supremo's unfettered powers and his all-consuming hatred or is this a foreshadowing of the outcome of the war? Once again, we are reminded about Jacintha's refusal to kill the child Sandrino in the forest.

In many places all over the metropolis, Supremo's mass hypnotism of the population begins, as mortals gather at various locations to commit mass suicide. The combined forces of the LLU and Sandrino's allies who shifted to LLU try their best to stop them.

At the communications facility where Supremo waits, Tristan meets his brother, ready to sacrifice his life. He reminds Sandrino of his humanity, of his life before the cursed ink, and this gives the Supremo pause as he battles to overpower the good in him. Unfortunately, the cursed ink seemingly prevails absorbing Sandrino once again. The Supremo seizes Tristan and Malia as both are mortally wounded. But just as Supremo prepares to deliver the final blow, the couple link hands and a surge of energy flows between them just as seen in Jethro's prophecy. Turns out, together they can successfully defeat Supremo, already weakening by the opposing humanity remaining in Sandrino.

Sandrino's personality once again emerges just as the Supremo's personality disintegrates into ashes with the cursed ink. Thanking Tristan for saving him from his evil self, Sandrino professes his love for his brother and disintegrates into ashes as well. In the epilogue, Malia notes that hardships will always be part of life even though the threat of the curse ink is now gone as long as there are mortals, werewolves, and vampires that have ill intentions.

== Cast and characters ==
=== Main cast ===
- Kathryn Bernardo as Malia Rodriguez/ Emilio "Miyo" Alcantara/ Toni Lumakad
  - Erika Clemente as young Malia
- Daniel Padilla as Tristan Torralba/ Tristan Imperial
  - Justin James Quilantang as young Tristan
- Richard Gutierrez as Sandrino V. Imperial/ Supremo/ Gilbert Imperial
  - Zyren Leigh Luansing as young Sandrino
- Angel Locsin as Jacintha Magsaysay /Lia Ortega-Rodriguez

=== Special Participation ===
- John Lloyd Cruz as Mateo Rodriguez

=== Supporting Cast ===
- Maricar Reyes-Poon as Samantha Imperial
- Albert Martinez as Theodore Montemayor
- Tony Labrusca as Jake Arguelles
- Gelli de Belen as Beatrice "Betty" Torralba-Domingo
- Ina Raymundo as Veruska Arguelles
- Victor Neri as Frederick Arguelles
- Joross Gamboa as Baristo Elizeo
- Bryan Santos as Gael Mercado
- Sue Ramirez as Catleya Del Luna
- Khalil Ramos as Lemuel Ruiz
- Nikki Valdez as Lydia Samonte
- Dino Imperial as Jethro Kabigting
- Niña Dolino as Clarisse Zaragoza
- Polo Ravales as Erin
- Sam Pinto as Diana
- Kristel Fulgar as Luningning "Ningning" Ramos
  - Elia Ilano as young Ningning
- Tanya Garcia as Rica "Fall" Sison-Torralba
- Shamaine Centenera-Buencamino as Barang
- Wilma Doesnt as Atty. Elize
- Maika Rivera as Malina
- Maymay Entrata as Apple Torralba
- Noel Trinidad as Gabriel Torralba
- Debraliz Valasote as Pina Torralba
- Randy Santiago as Noel "Doc" Domingo
- Desiree del Valle as Summer Sison
- Michael Agassi as Miguel
- Mikylla Ramirez as Nora
- Hyubs Azarcon as Bogart
- Edward Barber as Collin Domingo
- Sylvia Sanchez as Dolores "Dory" Lumakad
- Denise Laurel as Soraya Laurent
- Erika Padilla as Miriam Villamor
- Pinky Amador as Geneva Del Pino
- Freddie Webb as Senator Salvador Paglinauan
- Cris Villanueva as Pres. Osmundo Mercado
- Ketchup Eusebio as Lucho Herrero/Ermitanyo
- Dominic Roque as Jill Imperial
- Karen Timbol as Professor Ellie Montemayor
- Alora Sasam as Winter Sison
- Joan Bugcat as Spring Sison
- Jharmin Saddam as Porky Generoso
- Dennis Padilla as Berto Lumakad
- Meryll Soriano as Greta Lumakad
- John Steven De Guzman as Kuto Lumakad
- Chun Sa Jung as Lisa Lumakad
- Patrick Sugui as Andrey Dominic Ilagan
- Jane De Leon as Lauren Catapang / Joey Martinez
- Lance Pimentel as Rambo
- Joshua Colet as Leo Nakpil
- Badjie Mortiz as Piolo James Magbanua
- Joe Vargas as Hanno Parlingao
- Mark Neumann as Harbin Contreras
- AJ Muhlach as Levi Esguerra
- Barbie Imperial as Aira Feliz "Aife" Javier
- Mel Kimura as Madame Star
- Ali Khatibi as Borris Antonio
- Garrie Concepcion as Tasha
- Paolo Rivero as Virgel
- MJ Lastimosa as Tilda
- Bea Rose Santiago as Katrina
- Cindy Miranda as Elisse
- Kirst Viray as James Vinzon
- Yuki Sakamoto as Andrei Javier

=== Flashback Appearance ===
- Angel Locsin as Lyka Blancaflor Raymundo-Ortega
- Piolo Pascual as Noah Ortega
- Jomari Yllana as Roman Rodriguez
- Precious Lara Quigaman as Ceres Rodriguez
- Jake Roxas as Magnus Imperial
- Francine Prieto as Imelda Fontanilla
- Vivian Velez as Lucille Zaragoza
- Marlann Flores as Olive Marquez
- Rico Blanco as Lucas Ungson Teodoro

== Production ==
The writers of the series are Adam Cornelius Asin who wrote for the 2015 iteration of Pangako sa 'Yo and Mary Pearl Urtola who wrote for Dolce Amore.

La Luna Sangre marks the return of the KathNiel love team (consisting of Kathryn Bernardo and Daniel Padilla) to television after last starring in the 2015 series, Pangako sa 'Yo. The two appeared in six films Must Be... Love (2013), She's Dating the Gangster (2014), Crazy Beautiful You (2015), Barcelona: A Love Untold (2016) and Can’t Help Falling in Love (2017), before working with La Luna Sangre. The two trained in Pekiti and Wushu martial arts as part of the television series project. The television series also marks Richard Gutierrez's debut in ABS-CBN media. Maymay Entrata and Edward Barber also made their television series debut through La Luna Sangre.

== Marketing ==
La Luna Sangre was first revealed during the network's trade launch in November 2016. After releasing another teaser trailer on late March 2017, the soap opera premiered on June 19, 2017.

Since May 15, 2017, ABS-CBN has started uploading all the episodes of Lobo and Imortal on the network's YouTube channel, as prior to the premiere of La Luna Sangre.

On October 4, 2017, iWant TV exclusively expands La Luna Sangre universe with a "Youtopia" web series which centers on a group of friends whose friendships and trust in each other are tested, as they cross paths with the vampires of Sandrino's army. The Youtopia's cast are Axel Torres (played as Ryan Magno), Edrei Tan (played as Charlie Magno), Kate Alejandrino (played as Nica Enriquez), Jal Galang (played as Benj Alvarado), Gabby Padilla (played as Viv Enriquez), Mary Joy Apostol (played as Alex Alvarado), and Larissa Alivio (played as Crystal Reyes).

== Reception ==
=== Television ratings ===
Kantar Media National TV Ratings (8:30PM PST)
Pilot Episode	Finale Episode	Peak	Average
33.9% June 19, 2017	40.2% March 2, 2018	40.2% March 2, 2018	TBD

=== Awards ===
- 31st PMPC Star Awards for Television "Best Primetime Drama Series"
- AnakTVAwards 2017 "Household Favorite Program"
- 2nd Gawad Bedista Actress of the Year for TV - Kathryn Bernardo
- 2nd Gawad Bedista Actor of the Year for TV - Daniel Padilla
- 2nd Gawad Bedista TV Drama of the Year - La Luna Sangre
- 9th Northwest Samar State University Student Choice Awards for Radio and TV - Best Actress in Primetime Teleserye for La Luna Sangre- Kathryn Bernardo

== See also ==
- List of programs broadcast by ABS-CBN
- List of ABS-CBN Studios original drama series
- List of vampire television series
- List of programs broadcast by Jeepney TV
