= Won't Last a Day Without You =

- Theatrical film poster
- Directed by: Raz de la Torre
- Screenplay by: Melissa Mae Chua; Raz de la Torre; Carmi G. Raymundo
- Story by: Melissa Mae Chua
- Produced by: Marizel S. Martinez; Vincent del Rosario; Veronique del Rosario-Corpus
- Starring: Sarah Geronimo; Gerald Anderson
- Cinematography: Anne Monzon
- Edited by: Marya Ignacio
- Music by: Cesar Francis S. Concio
- Production companies: Star Cinema; Viva Films
- Distributed by: Star Cinema; Viva Films
- Release date: November 30, 2011
- Running time: 103 minutes
- Country: Philippines
- Language: Filipino
- Box office: ₱87.57 million (US$2,006,123.00)

Won't Last a Day Without You is a 2011 Filipino romantic comedy film directed by Raz de la Torre and co-written by Melissa Mae Chua and Carmi G. Raymundo from a story by Chua. The film stars Sarah Geronimo and Gerald Anderson with the special participation of Joey de Leon.

Produced and released by Star Cinema and Viva Films, the film was theatrically released in the Philippines on November 30, 2011, and this was also the second team-up of Anderson and Geronimo on the silver screen after Catch Me, I'm in Love, released eight months prior on March 26, although Anderson remained in Budoy.

== Plot ==
Awarded radio personality George Harrison Apostol, known as DJ Heidee to her listeners (Sarah Geronimo), provides love advice to people who are having problems in their relationships. DJ Heidee receives a call from a girl named Melissa (Megan Young) who is asking for advice on how to break up with her boyfriend Andrew (Gerald Anderson). Unfortunately, Andrew is listening to the same program and hears Heidee telling Melissa how they should break up. Andrew blames Heidee for what happened and even threatens to sue her for giving that particular advice. In order to prevent a legal battle, and to ease her conscience, Heidee decides to help Andrew win Melissa back. In the process of getting the two together, Andrew and Heidee begin to feel an attraction toward each other. Will they be able to overcome their past and become lovers instead?

== Cast ==
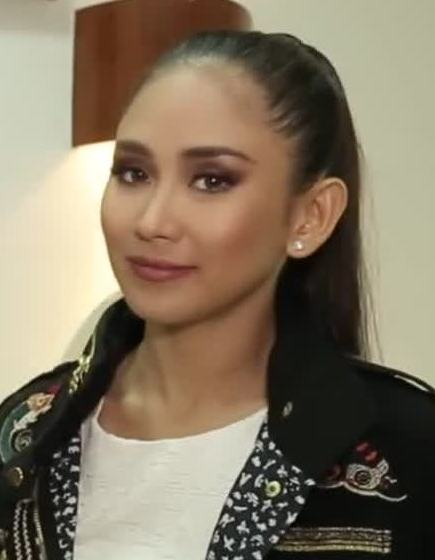
Sarah Geronimo portrays George Apostol/DJ Heidee

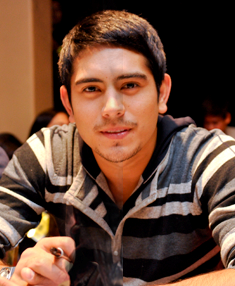
Gerald Anderson portrays Andrew Escalona

- Sarah Geronimo as George Apostol/DJ Heidee
- Gerald Anderson as Andrew Escalona
- Joey de Leon as Pablo Apostol
- John Lapus as DJ Ram
- Megan Young as Melissa
- Martin del Rosario as Duke
- Marlann Flores as Carol
- Niña Dolino as Paraluman/Pars Apostol
- Cheska Ortega as Yumi Apostol
- JV Kapunan as Jeff
- Lui Villaruz as Sir Bong
- Jommy Teotico as Dom
- Yam Concepcion as Anne
- Robi Domingo as Oscar
- Helga Krapf as Lauren
- JB Agustin as Elvis
- Anna Luna as DJ Petunya
- Jojo Gallego as Adio
- Alexis Navarro as Yumi's friend
- Jef Gaitan as sexy girl at gas station

== Reception ==
=== Box office ===
The film opened with ₱20 million gross of total receipts. In its third week, it grossed ₱88 million.

=== Critics ===
Philbert Dy of ClickTheCity said “It is a film that seems willing to acknowledge that relationships can be messy, and that people do get hurt and that it isn’t always easy to forgive. While the bad habits are still there, there is a charming core to the picture that seems truer than many of the things the mainstream has put out there.”

Abby Mendoza of Philippine Entertainment Portal quoted “Raz dela Torre’s film could have oh-so-melodramatically tackled the aforementioned heartbreak crisis… Instead, it does a favour to those who are in the process of healing by taking bitterness as a genuine emotion that only the failure of love can produce, and creating a feel-good, fresh, and hopeful narrative out of it.”
