= Imortal =

2010–11 Philippine television drama series

- Title card
- Genre: Drama; Horror; Fantasy; Action; Romance
- Written by: Mark Duane Angos; Arah Jell Badayos
- Directed by: Jerry Lopez-Sineneng; Trina N. Dayrit; Chito S. Roño; Richard V. Somes; Lester Pimentel (Stunt Director)
- Starring: John Lloyd Cruz; Angel Locsin
- Music by: Francis Concio
- Opening theme: "Walang Hanggan" by Yeng Constantino and Ney Dimaculangan
- Country of origin: Philippines
- Original language: Filipino
- No. of seasons: 2
- No. of episodes: 148 (list of episodes)

Production
- Executive producers: Carlo Katigbak; Cory Vidanes; Laurenti Dyogi; Malou Santos
- Producers: Janina Elaine Maquidang; Myleen H. Ongkiko; Sackey Prince Pendatun
- Editor: Bren John de Leon Joshua Ducasen
- Running time: 30-45 minutes
- Production company: Star Creatives

Original release
- Network: ABS-CBN
- Release: October 4, 2010 – April 29, 2011

Related
- Lobo (2008); La Luna Sangre (2017)

Imortal (lit. 'Immortal') is a Philippine television drama horror-fantasy series broadcast by ABS-CBN. The series is the second installment in the Moonstone trilogy and a sequel to Lobo. Directed by Jerry Lopez-Sineneng, Trina N. Dayrit, Chito S. Rono and Richard V. Somes, it stars John Lloyd Cruz and Angel Locsin. It aired on the network's Primetime Bida line up and worldwide on TFC from October 4, 2010 to April 29, 2011, and was replaced by I Am Legend.

The series is streaming online on YouTube.

== Plot ==
=== Prequel ===
Imortal is a sequel to the 2008 ABS-CBN fantasy series, Lobo. The previous series also starred Angel Locsin and Piolo Pascual. However, Lobo story-wise only included werewolves without any reference to vampires. Locsin's character in Imortal is the daughter of her character in Lobo.

=== Synopsis ===
In 1572, a group of powerful beings arrived on Philippine shores. Known as vampires, drinkers of human blood, their menace quickly spreads throughout the land. But unknown to them, a powerful clan of shapeshifters also lives in the islands—a group of beings who can transform themselves into powerful wolves - the Taong Lobos.

The Taong Lobos were the humans' protectors, and together, the two species formed an army to destroy the vampires. The blood drinkers were no match for the Taong Lobos. One by one, they fell. Those who survive go into hiding. Peace prevails among the humans and Taong Lobos, and the memory of the vampires fades. Around this time, the Taong Lobos deal with a crisis of their own giving way to the events of the first series of this trilogy, Lobo.

Unbeknownst to them, the vampires lay dormant for a reason: to organize and fortify their numbers until they are ready. They hold a dangerous secret: a prophecy, foretelling an epic battle between vampires and the Taong Lobos that will ultimately decide the fate of their respective bloodlines. The battle will be led by a powerful vampire and a powerful werewolf who are each other's nemesis and downfall. The vampires believe they have found their prophesied savior and are now preparing for the war to come. Meanwhile, the Taong Lobos have grown complacent and know nothing about the prophecy.

With the stage set for an epic battle, two individuals: Mateo (John Lloyd Cruz) and Lia (Angel Locsin) find themselves drawn to each other. As they grow closer, they unknowingly awaken the powers that are lying dormant within them—the same powers that will inevitably tear them apart.

=== Episodes ===
Season (s)	Episodes	Originally aired	
Season (s)	Episodes	Season premiere	Season finale
1	97	October 4, 2010	February 15, 2011
2	51	February 16, 2011	April 29, 2011

== Cast and characters ==
=== Main cast ===
Cast	Character	Summary
Angel Locsin	Lia R. Ortega-Rodriguez	The main female protagonist of the series. The youngest daughter of Noah and Lyka. She is the chosen one of the werewolves. Her ability as a werewolf can burn vampires using her hands when touched. She has stronger powers than her mother Lyka who bestows on her a special protection against vampires just before she dies.
John Lloyd Cruz	Mateo Rodriguez	The main male protagonist of the series. The son of Roman, the vampire and Ceres, a mortal. He is the first known child born out of such a union. He is the only human child who lives with the vampire community in his first seven years. His father wants to integrate him with the werewolf and mortal community, but his attempts at peace talks with Lyka fails because he is double-crossed by Magnus. He is later adopted by Simon Teodoro and grows up in the Teodoro household with Lucas, Simon's natural child. He is the chosen one of the vampires as he is the strongest vampire. He turns into a vampire after he dies in a battle against werewolves. He loves Lia and together with her defeats Magnus, Lucas and the Hybrid army.
Maricar Reyes	Samantha Imperial	Starts out as one of the minor antagonists of the series, she switches allegiance to Mateo and Lia and becomes one of their strongest allies. She is the adopted vampire daughter of Magnus Imperial. Her mother is bitten by Magnus while pregnant in a desperate attempt to sire the chosen vampire. Magnus raises her as the anointed “chosen one”, mistakenly believing Barang's prophecy that the savior would come from his lineage. Samantha grows up believing that she is the strongest vampire who would lead her clan in the battle against the werewolves and their Chosen One. She eventually learns that she is mistaken, and the "Chosen One" is Mateo. Samantha falls in love with Mateo and fulfills the third part of the prophecy, "the bite of pure love", by turning a dying Mateo into a vampire to save his life. She joins Roman's community of righteous vampires, betraying her own father, Magnus. She becomes one of Mateo's and Lia's strongest allies. Lucas injures her in battle through his venom, and she chooses to kill herself rather than become a hybrid.
Rico Blanco	Lucas Ungson Teodoro †	The main antagonist of the series. He is the son of Simon Teodoro and adoptive brother of Mateo. His mother is a fourth generation Ungson clan, one of the powerful clans of the Wayas. He becomes a hybrid after Magnus bites him. He builds an army of Hybrids that threaten all vampires, humans and werewolves.

=== Supporting cast ===
Cast	Character	Summary
Jaime Fabregas	Abraham Villamor	Lyka's colleague at the Waya Council and Lia's surrogate father and guardian after Lyka died. He protects Lia from the abusive Head Guardian / Lady Sentinel (term for female Lord Sentinel) Lucille Zaragoza. His daughter Miriam is Lia's best friend.
Vivian Velez	Lucille Zaragoza †	The main female antagonist of the series. Former head guardian of the Waya who succeeds Lyka after Lyka resigns following her family's assassination by vampires. She will do everything to keep the leadership of the Waya council, going as far as destroying Lyka's legacy as the last guardian. She strips the orphaned Lia of her privileged status and relegates her to a life of servitude. She abuses and torments Lia. At the end, she realizes her errors and joins Lia and Mateo's forces. She kills Magnus but dies in the process.
Jake Roxas	Magnus Imperial †	The main male antagonist of the series. The founder and leader of Club Sangre, an organization of evil vampires that aims to eliminate all werewolves to save their race. He is Samantha Imperial's adoptive father. He is Roman's enemy who sabotages Roman's peace efforts with Lyka. He kills Lyka at the surprise raid of Lyka's home.
Francine Prieto	Imelda Fontanilla †	The female antagonist of the series. She is Magnus' lover, who turns him into a vampire because she is in love with him. She turns against Magnus at the end of the series and joins Mateo and Lia's alliances.
Niña Dolino	Clarisse Zaragoza	One of the minor antagonists of the series. The daughter of Lucille and a member of the Waya council. She has an antagonistic relationship with Lia since childhood and is desperately in love with Mateo. She chooses to align with Lia when she realizes her mother's self-serving actions. She saves Mateo from the public execution her mother orders, and joins the Luna forces in the last battle against Magnus’ Force.
Nikki Valdez	Lydia	A righteous vampire colleague of Roman. She served as Mateo's foster mother during his childhood. She leads Roman's community and helps vampires transition from human blood drinkers to animal blood drinkers.
Johnny Revilla	Simon Teodoro	The owner of Simon Landholdings Inc. He is father to Lucas and adoptive father to Mateo, who rescues him from the streets. He trusts Mateo over Lucas.
Jomari Yllana	Roman Rodriguez †	Mateo's father. He is founder of the community of righteous vampires, who only drink animal blood. He attempts to reach out to Lyka to begin peace talks between vampires and werewolves as he believes they can peacefully coexist. He believes vampires don't need human blood to survive and his community proves this possible.
Beverly Salviejo	Dara	The secretary of Mateo and the aunt of Olive.
Vangie Labalan	Tabitha Matute †	Lia's surrogate mother after she is orphaned. She is a black werewolf.
Erika Padilla	Miriam Villamor	The best friend of Lia and daughter of Abraham.
Leandro Baldemor	Enrico "Tikboy" Kabigting	Jethro's father, a seer who is powerless with foretelling future events but he passes the genes to his son Jethro. He is also in Lobo as a child, played by Nash Aguas who could communicate with animals.
Dino Imperial	Jethro Kabigting	Tikboy's son who becomes a powerful seer. He is the blogger who posted the upcoming prophecy. Olive's best friend who falls in love with her. His feelings are hurt when Olive chooses Gael over Jethro in the grand opening of La Liga Unida, an organization for the peaceful friendship of werewolves, vampires, and mortals.
Marlann Flores	Olivia / Olive	Dara's niece and Jethro's love interest. Her first love is Jethro until she meets Gael who turns her into a vampire. She ends up having a mutual relationship with Gael.
Bryan Santos	Gael Mercado	A vampire ally of Magnus. He falls in love and has a mutual relationship with Olive. He switches his alliance to Lia and Mateo.
Carlos Agassi	Vergara	A member of the Waya's werewolf army and Lia's friend. He becomes Clarisse's boyfriend.
Nikki Bacolod	Jessica Arceo	A member of the Waya's werewolf army, Lia's friend and Vergara's assistant.
Rocky Salumbides	Tom Moreno †	The vampire best friend of Samantha who is in love with her.

=== Guest cast ===
- Angel Locsin as Lyka Blancaflor Raymundo-Ortega†
- Piolo Pascual as Noah Ortega†
- Mark Gil as Julio
- Kalila Aguilos as Barang
- Carlos Morales as Lyndon
- Christian Vasquez as Badong / Luis Cristobal
- Archie Alemania as Arturo Lumibao
- Dean de Jesus as vampire
- Danillo Barrios as Billy Villareal
- Menggie Cobarrubias as Jessie Cordero
- Manuel Aquino as Albert Esguerra
- Josh Ivan Morales as Benezor
- Angelo Garcia as Andoy
- Manuel Chua as Diego
- Kris Martinez as Francis
- Gerard Acao as Macoy
- Zeppi Borromeo as Baldo
- Thou Reyes as Rafael
- Andre Tiangco as Atty. Yumul
- Hermes Bautista as Taong Lobo
- David Chua as Taong Lobo
- Kevin Paul Lavarias as Taong Lobo
- Marion Dela Cruz as Taong Lobo
- Gem Ramos as Taong Lobo
- RJ Calipus as Taong Lobo
- Kristel Moreno as Severina
- Jhet Borillo as Vampire
- Helga Krapf as Vampire
- Rob Stumvoll as Vampire
- Princess Manzon as Vampire
- Richard Quan as Vampire
- Yuri Okawa as Vampire
- Rommel Velasquez as Waya Leo
- Allyson Lualhati as young Tabitha Matute
- Alwyn Uytingco as young Julio
- Matthew Mendoza as young Simon Teodoro
- Sheree Bautista as young Lucille Zaragosa
- Epy Quizon as young Abraham Villamor
- Precious Lara Quigaman as Ceres
- Justin Cuyugan as Alfredo
- Sajj Geronimo as young Lia
- Jairus Aquino as young Mateo (1st generation)
- John Paul Lubat as baby Mateo (2nd generation)
- Bugoy Cariño as young Mateo (2nd generation)
- Marites Juaquin as Darla†, Samantha's mother

== Reception ==
=== Ratings ===
On March 7, 2011, it was moved to a later timeslot to give way to Minsan Lang Kita Iibigin. Because of this, the show's ratings dropped to an average of more than 20 million viewers nightly from having more than 30 million viewers.

=== Launch ===
Imortal was launched as part of the half-term show line-up by ABS-CBN, launched as part of the 60th Anniversary of Philippine Soap Opera. The production of the series started In 2010.

== Promotion ==
=== DVD ===
The DVD series is internationally distributed to Volumes 1-13 containing all episodes.

=== Pangil: The teleserye-based RPG ===
Pangil (fangs) is an online role-playing game created in relation to the television show and was released before the premiere of the series was launched. The role-playing game involves around the character of Samantha (played by Maricar Reyes in the series) and players instruct her on her quest as she defeats the enemies. The locations on the game were also based on real locations in the Philippines such as Intramuros, Quiapo and Binondo.

=== The Hidden Chapters of Imortal: Anino't Panaginip ===
A series of webisodes were also released on the official website entitled Anino't Panaginip (Shadows and Dreams). It consists of 5 minute long episodes that were unreleased on television and was released every week as the series premieres. There are currently 24 webisodes.

== Sequel ==
A sequel to the Moonstone series entitled La Luna Sangre, starring Kathryn Bernardo, Daniel Padilla and Richard Gutierrez premiered on June 19, 2017. The sequel series was first revealed at the company's trade launch on November 22, 2016.

== Awards and nominations ==
Year	Award	Category	Work	Result
2010	ASAP Pop Viewer's Choice Awards	Pop Kapamilya TV Characters	John Lloyd Cruz as Mateo; Angel Locsin as Lia	Nominated
2011	2011 Golden Screen TV Awards	Outstanding Performance Of An Actor in a Drama Series	John Lloyd Cruz	Nominated
2011	2011 Golden Screen TV Awards	Outstanding Performance Of An Actress in a Drama Series	Angel Locsin	Nominated
2011	2011 Golden Screen TV Awards	Outstanding Supporting Actor in a Drama Series	Jake Roxas	Nominated
2011	25th PMPC Star Awards for Television	Best Drama Actor	John Lloyd Cruz	Nominated
2011	25th PMPC Star Awards for Television	Best Drama Actress	Angel Locsin	Nominated
2011	25th PMPC Star Awards for Television	Best Primetime TV Series	Cast	Nominated

== See also ==
- Lobo
- La Luna Sangre
- List of programs broadcast by ABS-CBN
- List of vampire television series
- Twilight
- Vampire films
