= Lobo (TV series) =

2008 Philippine television drama series

- Title card
- Also known as: She Wolf: The Last Sentinel
- Genre: Drama; Supernatural; Fantasy; Horror; Action; Romance
- Created by: ABS-CBN Studios; Mark Anthony Bunda
- Developed by: ABS-CBN Studios; Malou Santos
- Written by: Mark Duane Angos; Felina V. Bagas; Tanya Winona Bautista; Mark Anthony Bunda
- Directed by: FM Reyes; Cathy Garcia-Molina; Jerry Lopez Sineneng
- Starring: Piolo Pascual; Angel Locsin
- Ending theme: "Ikaw Ang Pangarap" by Martin Nievera
- Composers: Ogie Alcasid; Carmina Cuya
- Country of origin: Philippines
- Original language: Filipino
- No. of episodes: 118

Production
- Executive producers: Carlo Katigbak; Cory Vidanes; Laurenti Dyogi; Malou Santos
- Producers: Myleen H. Ongkiko; Annaliza A. Goma; Desirey Fernandez-Juan; Des M. De Guzman
- Production locations: Metro Manila; Antipolo, Rizal; Tanay, Rizal; Bulacan
- Camera setup: Multi-camera setup
- Running time: 30-45 minutes
- Production company: Star Creatives

Original release
- Network: ABS-CBN
- Release: January 28 – July 11, 2008

Related
- Imortal (2010); La Luna Sangre (2017)

Lobo (International title: She Wolf: The Last Sentinel / transl. Wolf) is a 2008 Philippine television drama fantasy series broadcast by ABS-CBN. The series is the first installment in the Moonstone trilogy. Directed by FM Reyes, Cathy Garcia-Molina and Jerry Lopez Sineneng and it stars by Piolo Pascual and Angel Locsin. It aired on the network's Primetime Bida line up and worldwide on TFC from January 28 to July 11, 2008, replacing Patayin sa Sindak si Barbara and was replaced by Iisa Pa Lamang.

== Overview ==
=== Production ===
In 2004, Lobo was already planned as a project by ABS-CBN Studios with the original storyline centering on siblings who are both wolves. Robin Padilla was the first choice of ABS-CBN for the role "Noah" with Claudine Barretto as "Lyka". Kristine Hermosa and Bea Alonzo were also considered but these pairings was scrapped when Padilla transferred to GMA-7. In early 2007, John Lloyd Cruz and Anne Curtis were also offered the lead roles but turned them down due to a prior commitment to return to their roles for the sequel to the television drama Maging Sino Ka Man. The show finally began formal preparations, training, and filming with the transfer of Angel Locsin to ABS-CBN. The management decided to pair her with Piolo Pascual. Heart Evangelista was also offered "Gabriella"'s role now played by Shaina Magdayao. The choice of the dog who portrays Lyka's white wolf alter-ego brought about ABS-CBN's decision to buy a purebred dog named Brasca a White Shepherd all the way from France costing P200,000.

== Summary ==
The plot revolves around young lovers Lyka Raymundo (played by Angel Locsin) and Noah Ortega (played by Piolo Pascual). Lyka is a young woman aspiring to be a fashion designer, working as a fashion assistant in the House of Elle. She lives with her aunt Clara and her step cousin Anton.

Noah is the adopted son of General Leon Cristobal, who takes over guardianship of Noah after his real father, Emil Ortega, dies in a tragic accident involving an unknown wolf. Noah is a second lieutenant of the Philippine Army, being actively recruited to join the Luna force, an elite team specializing in protecting humans from dangerous werewolves and vampires.

Lyka's position as fashion assistant to Lady Elle is foreshadowed by the fact that she is a werewolf who hasn't transformed yet, who doesn't know she is one because her werewolf mother abandons her as a child. Her mother is Vanessa Blancaflor Raymundo, daughter of Lorenzo Blancaflor, the twin brother of Eleanor Blancaflor (played by Pilar Pilapil), owner of the fashion house icon, House of Elle. Secretly, the Blancaflors are a powerful werewolf clan who leads the Waya Council for generations. Destiny brings Lyka to the seat of the Wayas.

Lyka is believed to be the last hope, the "Huling Bantay" ("Last hope/Last Guardian") of her fellow Werewolves. Lady Elle instantly senses her presence at a chance encounter, and immediately hires Lyka to work directly with her team so she could closely watch over her and help her through her transformation, which she believes would occur sometime or after her 21st birthday.

At about the same time when Lyka applies at the House of Elle, the Wayas are searching for their Huling Bantay who would have the strength and power to save the werewolf population from the deadly rays of the upcoming Red Moon ("Pulang Buwan"), a phenomenon that occurs every 500 years, which could potentially purge and destroy all the werewolves. Only the Last Guardian, the strongest Waya, can save the species by "raising the stone of Remus". The last "Huling Bantay" is Remus, who keeps the talisman for the next Guardian to use. Lady Elle is certain that Lyka is worthy and strong enough to be their Last Guardian.

In the House of Elle, Lyka crosses paths with Noah, Lady Elle's bodyguard and driver. Lyka and Noah fall in love, but their relationship is hindered by Noah's deep hatred for werewolves, as he blames them for killing his father and foster father. By the time they fall deeply in love, Lyka reaches her “time” - fully accepting her werewolf nature and the bigger responsibility as the Last Guardian. Despite the many obstacles, Noah and Lyka's love for each other prevails. They marry, and together battle and defeat their enemies.

Three other characters create additional conflict: Noah's friend, Gabrielle Dizon (played by Shaina Magdayao), a deep penetration agent tasked to bring Noah over to the Luna Force for the sinister purposes to destroy and rid the country of all werewolves altogether, complicated by the fact that she is in love with Noah and truly cares for him; Anton Rivero, Lyka's step cousin, her protector against his abusive step mother Clara, and obsessively in love with Lyka; and General Silva, a secret rogue werewolf banished by the Wayas, out to seek revenge and destroy the council.

There are two opposing groups in the story— the Lunas and the Wayas. The Lunas are organized by the Philippine Army to protect humans against werewolves and vampires, but a small faction under General Silva, holds a personal grudge against the werewolves, aiming to undermine Luna leadership and destroy the entire werewolf population. Silva has a special interest in Noah, who is recruited not only for his superior skills, but mainly because flowing through his blood is a natural immunity to werewolf bites, a gene inherited from his father. General Silva, together with Anton, manipulates Noah to join the force to obtain his blood and develop an antidote for the poisonous werewolf bites.

The other opposing group, the Waya Inc. is led by Lady Elle. Wayas control and preside over the affairs of the white werewolves and execute justice over the black werewolves and vampires who prey on humans. Since the vampires had retreated into hiding, the Waya mostly has to deal with the rogue werewolves, secretly working with the Lunas to provide protection for their species.

There are two warring factions among the werewolves that threaten the agreement between the Wayas and the Lunas and disturbs the peace within the population. While the white werewolves respect the human beings in their midst and live in peace with them, albeit secretly; the black werewolves kill humans, perpetuating the biggest reason why werewolves are feared. The Wayas control their species and impose justice on werewolves who drink human blood, doing their best to apprehend and kill the black werewolves.

On the night of the Red Moon, Lyka, fully accepting her role as "Huling Bantay", successfully retrieves the Stone of Remus, narrowly losing her life, and saves her people from the purge. She exhorts them to co-exist harmoniously with human beings, and to stop the prejudice against the black wolves. She becomes their Head Guardian, leading the council for an integrated black and white werewolf population.

Lyka later defeats the bigger threat of her stepcousin's metamorphosis into a demon werewolf. Anton is an accomplished chemist, whose specialty is animal diseases and virus mutations. All his life, he works towards finding a cure for his werewolf nature, believing that he was infected and does not have an inherited gene. As a child, he is accidentally bitten by Vanessa, then in werewolf form. General Silva hires him to work on the antidote for poisonous werewolf bites. Anton discovers a more potent formulation, a mixture of Lyka's and Noah's blood which he injects into his system, giving him an immunity to werewolf bites, and the ability to heal his wounds quickly. Using the Stone of Remus which he steals from Lyka, and following instructions from an ancient book General Silva has in his possession, he transforms into a powerful werewolf. Unfortunately, his distorted love and obsession for Lyka changes his soul and personality, turning him into a formidable enemy, who almost defeats Lyka and Noah in their last battle.

Celebrating their victory and the peaceful coexistence of humans and werewolves, Lady Elle toasts Noah and Lyka's pregnancy, foreshadowing two sequels, Imortal and La Luna Sangre. Lyka and Noah are pushing two twin strollers.

== Cast and characters ==
=== Main cast ===
Cast	Character	Summary
Angel Locsin	Lyka B. Raymundo-Ortega	Lyka wanted to be a famous fashion designer and she thought her job as a fashion assistant in the "House of Elle" was the best opportunity. However, her dreams are derailed by the harsh truth of her real nature. She faces a Herculean task as “Huling Bantay”, the savior of her werewolf race. Possessing superior powers than the normal werewolves, Lyka is the strongest and most powerful of her species. She falls in love with a mortal man, Noah Ortega, breaching destiny's law of the commingling of mortal and werewolf.
Piolo Pascual	Noah Ortega	Noah is a Second Lieutenant in the Philippine Army, working undercover as personal guard for Eleanora Blancafloran, a suspected Waya Leader. Noah belongs to an elite force tasked with uncovering werewolves. He is known for his intelligence, skills and speed in combat. Behind his quiet and mysterious look lies a man who is capable of loving deeply. He falls in love with Lyka but encounters resistance from numerous forces. He defies everything he believes in for the sake of his love.

=== Supporting cast ===
Cast	Character	Summary
Shaina Magdayao	Gabrielle Dizon	An asset of the military who belongs in the Intelligence Division, Gabrielle is Noah's mistah and best friend. But her dedication to her craft will push her to fight against Noah who happens to be the man she secretly loves. She will do anything to make Noah happy even if it hurts her in the process.
Geoff Eigenmann	Alec Aragon / Remus	A werewolf descendant of Remus who came to train Lyka in her role as Huling Bantay. He fell in love with Lyka. He also plays Remus, the last Huling Bantay. The role of the Huling Bantay comes every five hundred years, meaning the Last Guardian of the werewolves, tasked to save the race from the deadly rays of the Pulang Buwan (“Red Moon”) a phenomenon that serves to purge the werewolf population.
Ryan Eigenmann	Anton Rivero	He is deeply in love with Lyka whom he grew up with as a cousin. Using his intelligence as a chemist and his innate ferociousness, Anton will do everything in his power to have Lyka even if one of the choices is to kill Noah. He is the last villain that Lyka and Noah defeats.
Pilar Pilapil	Eleanora Blancaflor a.k.a. Lady Elle	Her fabulous contribution in the fashion industry is famed across Asia. She is president of the "House of Elle," leader of an organization called "Waya" and was tagged the strongest Waya before Lyka. Hidden beneath her glamorous image and lifestyle is her ultimate secret known to a selected few. Lady Elle is also the stern protector of Lyka. She learns that Lyka is her twin brother Lorenzo's long lost granddaughter.
Agot Isidro	Nessa Blancaflor- Raymundo	Nessa is Lorenzo Blancaflor's daughter who did not know she was a werewolf because her father had died. She transformed past her scheduled time, a “Nilaktawan”, accidentally killed her mother and later on, her fiancé. Her dangerous nature forced Nessa to abandon her only child (Lyka) for the sake of the latter's safety. She was captured and imprisoned as a lab study in a top secret facility owned by a secret faction of the Lunas.
Dante Rivero	Gen. Leon Cristobal	He is Noah's adoptive father. He took over raising Noah after his father died. He is a military man who raises his kids with an iron fist. He takes his responsibility at work more seriously that his mysterious missions come first before his duty as a father to Noah and Zoe.
Robert Arevalo	Manolo Sebastian	Owner of the "House of Elle" and a former member of the Luna organization. The Luna was formed to catch and destroy all werewolves. Manolo fell in love with Lady Elle and got to know the werewolves as kind, fair and peace-loving beings, who did not tolerate their own kind's killing of humans. He uses his power and influence to protect the werewolves, especially Lady Elle's community. He is willing to risk everything he owns in the name of love.
Dimples Romana	Trixie	Works as a costume mistress in the "House of Elle". She is Lyka's closest friend and guardian ("tag-alaga") and is a direct descendant from a line of seers; her grandmother was Remus’ seer, who has passed on the legacy to Trixie. She serves as Lyka's seer.
Irma Adlawan	Clara Rivero	She acts as surrogate mother to both Lyka and Anton. Clara's world mainly revolves around Anton since she sees him as a real son while Lyka suffers from her callousness. At one point of the story, she has to decide if she will kill Lyka for Anton.

=== Extended cast ===
- Lauren Young as Zoe Cristobal
- AJ Perez as Bayani "Yani" Mendoza
- Spanky Manikan as General Crisostoco Silva / Alberto de la Rama
- Nash Aguas as Enrico "Tikboy" Kabigting
- Gio Alvarez as Elton
- Maritoni Fernandez as Dr. Vivian Lee
- Simon Ibarra as Father Ben
- Cris Villanueva as Minyong
- Ahron Villena as Andrew/Omar
- Archie Adamos as Leo
- Evelyn Buenaventura as "Mananangal"
- Janus del Prado as Choy
- Eric Fructuoso as Rodolfo
- Dionne Monsanto as Clarrise
- Eri Neeman as Dan
- Crispin Pineda
- KC Aboloc as Annie
- Timmy Cruz as Ylvana Zaragoza

=== Guest cast ===
- Kier Legaspi as Nicholas Raymundo
- Liza Lorena as Mrs. Blancaflor
- Susan Africa as older Savannah
- Bobby Andrews as Emilio "Emil" Ortega. Noah's father. Boyfriend of Nessa prior to her changing to a werewolf. When Nessa showed her wolf form to Emil, he got scared and called Nessa a monster. He later reconciles with her after Nessa went back to her sister.
- Angel Aquino as young Savannah
- Sheryl Cruz as young Elle Blancaflor
- Diether Ocampo as Lorenzo Blancaflor
- Christian Vasquez as young Leon Cristobal
- Chinggoy Alonzo as Mr. Blancaflor
- Alexander Romano as young Anton
- Beatriz Saw as young Trixie
- Jacob Dionisio as young Noah Ortega / Jay-Jay

== Reception ==
=== Ratings ===
The show premiered on January 28, 2008, with a rating of 27.7%. This registered a higher pilot reception compared to Palos and Kung Fu Kids in Mega Manila ratings. The series finale got the high ratings of 33.4% (together with The Singing Bee, which garnered 33.2% in the nationwide ratings game according to the NUTAM (Nationwide Urban TV Audience Measurement) conducted by AGB Nielsen. Its average rating was 32%, ranked 8th for the year 2008, in AGB Nielsen NUTAM survey.

=== Theme song ===
Lobo's theme song, Ikaw Ang Aking Pangarap (literal English translation: "You Are My Dream" or "You Are My Desire"), was composed by Ogie Alcasid and was originally sung by Martin Nievera. Halfway through the season, a duet version of the song, performed by Martin Nievera and Raki Vega, was introduced.

=== Awards and recognitions ===
Year	Organization	Host city/Country	Category	Result
2008	22nd PMPC Star Awards for Television	Philippines	Best Primetime Drama Series	Won
2008	22nd PMPC Star Awards for Television	Philippines	Best Drama Actor (Piolo Pascual)	Won
2008	22nd PMPC Star Awards for Television	Philippines	Best Drama Actress (Angel Locsin)	Nominated
2008	7th Gawad Tanglaw	Philippines	Best Primetime Drama Series	Won
2008	Anak TV Seal Awards	Philippines	Most Well-Liked TV Program	Won
2009	BANFF World Television Festival	Toronto, Canada	Best Telenovela Program	Won
2009	37th International Emmy Awards	New York, USA (United States)	Best Performance by an Actress (Angel Locsin)	Nominated
2010	National Commission for Culture and the Arts of the Philippines	Philippines	Recognition (Angel Locsin)	Won
2010	National Commission for Culture and the Arts of the Philippines	Philippines	Recognition (Best Telenovela International Award)	Won

=== International release ===
The series aired in Kenya as She Wolf on Citizen TV in 2010.

According to ABS-CBN International Sales & Distribution, the series will soon be shown in different countries in Asia with the English title of She Wolf: The Last Sentinel. ABS-CBN Teleseryes penetrate TV landscape in other countries as it was also set to be aired in Thailand television. The series re-aired again on Jeepney TV starting March 11, 2013.

== International broadcast ==
Country	Alternate title/translation	TV network(s)	Year	Airdate	Weekly schedule
Nigeria	She Wolf	Mytv promo	2013	January - May	Daily at 22:00
Kenya	She Wolf	Citizen TV	2010		Mon - Fri 6:05 pm
Uganda	Lobo	Urban TV	2017		

== Sequel series ==
In 2010, ABS-CBN decided to produce a sequel to the series entitled, Imortal. According to ABS-CBN.com, Lia, also played by Angel Locsin, is the daughter of Noah and Lyka Ortega.

A second sequel entitled La Luna Sangre, starring Kathryn Bernardo and Daniel Padilla aired from June 19, 2017 to March 2, 2018. The sequel series was first revealed at the company's trade launch on November 22, 2016.

== See also ==
- Imortal
- La Luna Sangre
- List of programs broadcast by ABS-CBN
- List of ABS-CBN Studios original drama series
