= Niña Dolino =

Filipino actress

- Born: October 26, 1982 (age 43); Manila, Philippines
- Occupation: Actress
- Years active: 2006–present
- Agent: Star Magic (2006–present)

Niña Dolino (born October 26, 1982) is a Filipino actress.

== Filmography ==
=== Television ===
Year	Title	Role	Notes	Source
2006	Wazzup Wazzup	Herself / Tadjock		
2006	Breakfast	Herself / Guest co-host		
2007	Kabarkada Break the Bank	Herself / Host		
2007	Mars Ravelo's Lastikman	Jane		
2008	Your Song Presents: Without You		Guest	
2008–2009	Carlo J. Caparas' Pieta	Jessa		
2009	Maynila	Liz	Episode: "Arra's Choice"	
2009	May Bukas Pa	Paeng's daughter	Guest, 1 episode	
2009	Maalaala Mo Kaya		Episode: "Kalendaryo"	
2009	Maalaala Mo Kaya		Episode: "Taxi"	
2009	Precious Hearts Romances Presents: Somewhere In My Heart	Annette Gorospe		
2010	Precious Hearts Romances Presents: Lumang Piso Para Sa Puso	Joan		
2010	Precious Hearts Romances Presents: Impostor	Cristine		
2010	Imortal	Clarisse Zaragosa		
2011	Maalaala Mo Kaya	Mayflor	Episode: "Callao Cave"	
2011	Wansapanataym	Kimberly	Episode: "Wan Tru Lav"	
2011	Ikaw Ay Pag-Ibig	News reporter		
2011	Wansapanataym	Jingle	Episode: "Christmas Caroline"	
2011	Maria La Del Barrio	Bianca Lopez		
2011	Nasaan Ka Elisa?	Martha		
2012	Wansapanataym	Edith	Episode: "Witchy Mitch"	
2012	Princess and I	Yin Huan Dy		
2013	Got to Believe	Aira Jean		
2013	Wansapanataym	Terry	Episode: "Give Glove On Christmas Day"	
2014	The Legal Wife	Digna		
2014	Ipaglaban Mo!	Saling	Episode: "Kaya Ba Kitang Itakwil?"	
2014	Wansapanataym	Ms. Dawin	Episode: "Witch-A-Makulit"	
2014	Hawak Kamay	Meann's Friend		
2015	Bridges of Love	Young Veronica		
2015	Pangako Sa'Yo	Roma Christie		
2016	FPJ's Ang Probinsyano	Iris		
2016	Born for You	Racquel		
2016	Langit Lupa	Wilma		
2017	My Dear Heart	Nina Victorio		
2017	La Luna Sangre	Clarisse Zaragosa		
2018	Bagani	Malang		
2018	Halik	Marissa Toledo		
2019	Parasite Island	Stephanie Salvacion		

=== Film ===
Year	Title	Role	Notes	Source
2009	And I Love You So	Sexy Girl 1		
2010	Babe, I Love You	Monique		
2010	Till My Heartaches End	Maricar		
2011	No Other Woman	Marian		
2011	Won't Last A Day Without You	Paraluman/Pars		
2012	My Cactus Heart	Helena		
2012	24/7 in Love			
2014	She's Dating the Gangster	Athena's stepmom		
2014	Maria Leonora Teresa	Cheri		
2015	Everyday I Love You	Carmel		
2016	Everything About Her	Arlene		
2017	Can't Help Falling in Love	Janine Aguinaldo		
2018	One Great Love	Annie		
