= Marlann Flores =

Filipino actress and model

- Born: Marlann Ponciano Flores; February 11, 1993 (age 33); San Pedro, Laguna, Philippines
- Other names: Lann, Marls
- Occupation: Actress
- Years active: 2010–present
- Agents: Star Magic; GMA Artist Center
- Relatives: Charo Santos-Concio (aunt-in-law); Malou Santos (aunt-in-law)

Marlann Flores-Santos (born Marlann Ponciano Flores; born February 11, 1993), is a Filipino actress and model. She began her acting career in 2010, with several minor television and film roles, and played a regular role on the Imortal television show. She appeared in hit movies like No Other Woman and Bride for Rent. Marlann also had a major role on the hit television show Dyesebel. She is now a freelance artist.

== Early life ==
Flores was born in San Pedro City, Laguna, Philippines. With her parents being divorced, she was their family's breadwinner. At the age of 12, she was a street vendor. At that age, she was also interested in pursuing a career in film.

== Career ==
In 2008, Flores was entitled Ms. Teen Earth Philippines. And in 2009 she won Ms. Teen Earth International.

She was one of the talents of Star Magic and was under contract with ABS-CBN.

In 2010, she appeared as Marlann, a rich teenager, in Gimik 2010. She also portrayed the role of Olive/Olivia in the supernatural-fantasy horror TV series, Imortal, a human who was turned into a vampire by her lover Gael and at the same time, resurrected her dead body.

In 2011, Marlann started to appear in Maalaala Mo Kaya. She performed the role of a young girl named Karen in the episode "Bibliya" along with Martin Del Rosario, Mercedes Cabral and Ian Veneracion. She also appeared in the films No Other Woman as Charmaine's sister, and in Won't Last A Day Without You with Gerald Anderson and Sarah Geronimo.

In 2012, Flores appeared in the Maalaala Mo Kaya episode "Kurtina" as a girl who agrees to live with a guy named Akhmed (JM De Guzman) for 700 pesos. In 2014, appeared in the film Maybe this Time.

Flores then transferred from ABS-CBN to GMA Network in 2016, as she wanted to explore new opportunities. She appeared regularly on the sitcom Hay, Bahay! playing the character of household helper, Bolina. She also became one of the hosts of Day Off, was an online correspondent for Encantadia Session, and made a guest appearance on Bubble Gang.

== Personal life ==
Since 2022, Flores has been married to Bryan Santos, an actor who she met on the set of Imortal, and is also a former member of the vocal group Harana. Santos is also the nephew of former ABS-CBN executive Charo Santos-Concio and Star Cinema head Malou Santos. They have a daughter, Mikaela.

== Filmography ==
=== Television ===
Year	Title	Role
2010	Your Song Presents: Gimik 2010	Marlann
2010	Imortal	Olive/Olivia
2011	Maalaala Mo Kaya: Bibliya	Karen
2012	Precious Hearts Romances Presents: Lumayo Ka Man Sa Akin	Leila Falcon
2012	Maalaala Mo Kaya: Kurtina	Flor
2012	Wansapanataym: Ang Bagong Kampeon Sa Bagong Taon	Tina
2013	Maalaala Mo Kaya: Orasan	Clarissa
2013	Juan Dela Cruz	Liway
2013	Maalaala Mo Kaya: Singsing	Young Emily
2014	Mars Ravelo's Dyesebel	Sally
2014	Ikaw Lamang	Young Esther
2015	Wansapanataym: Yamishita's Treasures	Flora
2016	Bubble Gang	Herself
2016	Laff, Camera, Action!	Herself/Contestant
2016	Maynila	Malaya
2016	Ismol Family	
2016	Hay, Bahay!	Bolina
2016	Sinungaling Mong Puso	Josephine
2016	Alyas Robin Hood	Honey
2016	Dear Uge	Joanna
2017	Haplos	Kara
2019	Tadhana	Stephanie

=== Movies ===
Year	Title	Role
2018	My Perfect You	Angel
2014	Maybe This Time	Mels
2014	Bride for Rent	Bekya
2013	Pagpag: Siyam na Buhay	Sheryll
2012	24/7 in Love	Jonas de Cuesta
2011	Won't Last A Day Without You	Carol
2011	No Other Woman	Violet Dela Costa
