= List of Minsan Lang Kita Iibigin characters =

The original main and supporting cast. Upper row (L–R) Martin del Rosario as Noberto, Dante Rivero as Edgardo. Middle row (L–R) John Estrada as Joaquin, Ronaldo Valdez as Jaime, Boots Anson-Roa as Remedios, Tonton Gutierrez as Tomas. Lower row (L–R) Lorna Tolentino as Alondra, Andi Eigenmann as Gabrielle, Coco Martin as Javier and Alexander, Maja Salvador as Kaye and Amy Austria-Ventura as Lora.

This article contains cast and character information for the ABS-CBN Philippine television soap opera Minsan Lang Kita Iibigin.

== Main cast ==
=== Alexander Del Tierro ===
2nd Lt. Alexander "Xander" S. Del Tierro (Coco Martin) He comes from a prominent family with a strong military background. He has a domineering grandfather who is one of the country's feared generals, a manipulative mother solely devoted to pleasing her father, her husband but not her own son, and a father who is a respected military officer and the only one who truly understands him. He has consistently refused to join the military academy, but one major mistake made him decide otherwise. He graduates with honors from the academy; despite this achievement, Alexander feels empty. His duty took him to the mountains and it is there that he began to fill the void in his heart where he finds Javier, his twin brother. He falls in love with a rebel, Kaye who was Javier's former girlfriend, their relationship got easier as she decides to take amnesty and turn her back from her principle.

In Season 2, Alexander decides to be based in Manila to become closer to his family, particularly his brother. Upon the decision of the Chief of Staff, he spearheaded the investigation of carnapping incidents and suspects that Javier has been involved, even though he thought right, he failed to prove it from the evidences he has gathered. This leads Javier thinking that his family can revolve around him instead. Alexander experiences Lover's Quarrel with Krista and apologises many times, he soon tries to fix things by asking her to marry him for which Kaye refuses. As his auntie is freed from prison, he sees his affection for his brother and asks her if she could treat him like a son like his brother. Finally after months and trials of proposing to Kaye she reconciles and agrees to marry him. Alexander and his family visits Kaye's house to meet and get to know each other. Meanwhile, he finally confronts his brother of all his wrongdoings, his jealousy and immaturity after he saw his auntie (birth mother) Lora crying after she had a conversation with Javier. As Javier runs away from the police, he and Gabrielle were assigned to work with the police to help capture his brother. Days after he is informed that Javier is roaming around a street near their house. He runs for Javier and ends up getting hit by his brother. He comes back being a whole different person after the attack. In Minsan May Impostor it is revealed that Javier is impersonating him and the real Alexander is hidden in an abandoned warehouse far from Manila in the forest. Before his twin leaves, Javier took an Iron Mask and wore it on his brother (a parody of The Man in the Iron Mask). Javier visits him again and gives him food, Alexander asks him to set him free but refuses to and tightens the mask and rope he is wearing. Meanwhile, he manages to untie the ropes until Javier comes in and pretends that he hasn't find a way to escape. He later takes the rope off and kick Javier and escapes but is unfortunately hit by Alondra and loses consciousness. Alondra and Javier immediately pulls him back and ties him up and drives away before he wakes up. He later hears Gabrielle and sees her in pain and finds that her best friend has been stabbed. He crawls to her and sees Gabrielle passing away in front of him and cries for help. At night he finds a person dragging Gabrielle's body away, suspecting that it was Javier who really was Mimi but refused to talk. Finally, Alexander finds a way to escape and breaks the padlocks and mask but is still locked inside. Javier visits him and fortunately he wins this fight and retains his name and uniform back and yearns revenge for Gabrielle's death suspecting that it is Javier's fault. He ties Javier up while he is still unconscious and in a reversal of events, he locks Javier up in the cage. He comes back to the military camp and decides not to say anything about Javier's case and that he saw Gabrielle dying in front of him. He runs for Krista and begs her not to leave; he tells her about Javier capturing him after trying so hard not to tell anyone else as it would be dangerous and would be harder to find who killed Gabrielle. He later suspects that his mother Alondra is working with Javier and can be a possible suspect concerning Gabrielle's murder. Alondra's acquaintance with Javier is later proven when he sees his mother and congratulates him for portraying Alexander so well. After finding Gabrielle's body, he checks on Javier and finds that he has escaped but someone has helped him suspecting that it is Alondra, being the only one who has kept connection with him. In Gabrielle's funeral he shares his experiences with her being his best friend and being the one by his side in laughter and sorrow, in sadness and happiness she never left his side and cares more for others and their happiness instead of hers. Alexander shares that Gabrielle is one of the person that gives all her love. That she might not be perfect as a person but is at being a friend and finishes off saying that he loves her and is ready to sacrifice himself for her. With his grandfather being furious, he speaks up and tells what he and Krista has heard concerning Diego, Ibon and Tiago's plans, being the three responsible for the attack causing Remedios' death and is still planning to kill Javier. He also informs that it wasn't him that Gabrielle was following before she died but was Javier and that he impersonated him while he was unconscious and locked up in a cage. Alexander tells them that it was Javier who broke up with Krista and courted Gabrielle and kissed her but is sure that he wasn't part of Gabrielle's death as he is in love with her. He also shares that they've kept Javier in the cage but he has escaped and says that he has only one suspicion on who helped Javier and that is Alondra. After finding out that Mimi and Tomas are related, he brought into conclusion of the possibility that Alondra might've taken him from Lora and that Lora is his real mother, he takes a DNA sample and is meanwhile proven that Lora is in fact his mother. He unites with Lora and promises her that they would never part and would love her as a son, the way Lora never felt and also clears up the questions in his mind of why he never felt Alondra's affection. Alondra blames him for what is happening to her with the people she loves leaving her and that it is all his fault, Alexander tells him that it is her fault and that he stole his life but assures Alondra that he would never insult her because he still respects and loves her but Alondra tells him that she doesn't need his affection. Alexander finds out that Tomas has escaped and is sure that he is going to Lora. With all the military surrounding their house, he orders one of them to check on his mother. They discover that Lora has gone missing and immediately searches for her with the help Berto. He drops off Berto and goes back to the warehouse where Alondra has kept Lora as of right now. Lora meanwhile escapes and hears a gunshot and finds Javier and a bloody Alondra. He immediately calls for back up and a medical group for Alondra but is hit by Javier but immediately stands up and runs after his brother and asks him to surrender. They find out that the rebels have Alondra and despite all the things she's done to him, he agrees to help her and pretend to be Javier to save her because she is still family. He comes to the building and sees Alondra covered with bombs and fails to rescue her. Alexander apologises to her for failing to stop the bombs from exploding though Alondra asks for forgiveness to him after all these years before she died. A year after, he celebrates his wedding with Krista and are now happy parents of twin brothers.

=== Javier Del Tierro ===
Javier Del Tierro (Coco Martin) – Towards Season 1 he is introduced as a jolly person. He discovers that he has a twin brother when he encounters Alexander in a fight; even though he's a soldier and Javier is a rebel, he becomes friends with him. He switches with his brother and they both live each other's lives from time to time until Alondra finds them together. While in Alexander's identity, he falls in love with Gabrielle, Alexander's childhood best friend, but she doesn't feel the same way. In an episode, it is revealed that Lora is their real mother but it is yet to be revealed when one owns up and tells the truth between Alondra, Mimi and Tomas.

In Season 2, Javier struggles to be part of the society. He finds his sense of belonging with new group of friends, and end up getting involved in car theft business. His role changes as he creates anger towards his brother, sick of being regarded as the lesser and uneducated twin, his friends influence him to ruin his brother's name, he does this by leaking a photo of him hugging Gabrielle for which the military gets involved in. In an episode, he finds out that his friends has been using him all along, he works with the police and Alexander to capture them so that he couldn't end up in jail only getting minor consequences. He tells Kaye that there will be no way of him fixing things up with his brother. As his surrogate mother, Lora takes amnesty he suffers from choosing between his supposed real mother Alondra and his birth mother Lora. After discovering that Javier has done some very bad things, Lora talks to Javier and feels as if she doesn't love him anymore though he continues to visit her. He also develops friendship with Gabrielle until he overhears her conversation with Berto that there will be no chance of her loving Javier. He visits Lora again and hears her and Remedios talking about Alexander and how they think that they have fallen for his kindness. Through this he gets jealous once again and tells Alondra that Lora doesn't love him anymore. He confronts Lora and insults him. He goes with his family to Krista's house for Alexander's planned marriage. Lora asks him to talk to her outside and had their conversation where Javier has completely turned her back on his real mother thinking that he is with his real family. In Minsan Makulong Sa Pag Gustong Tumulong Javier gets imprisoned for allegations of physical assault to Inigo Suarez. He forces his way out of jail but fails to wanting to see his grandmother. Alondra tells him that Lora and Bernabe doesn't care about him anymore, the reason why they're not helping him get out of prison. Remedios visited him in his dreams and promises that he would change when he gets out of prison not knowing that her grandmother is dying. Alondra, Joaquin, Alexander and Jaime takes him out of prison and tells him that Inigo has pulled his case in return of pulling their case concerning their carnapping business. Joaquin tells him that they already had a solid alibi to stop investigating on them. Ka Diego and the others also failed the test telling them if they were using guns from the past 24 hours. As of right now they still need further investigation to suspect who really pulled the trigger. Alondra later breaks into silence and tells Javier that Remedios has died. Inigo visits Javier and jokes around telling him that he killed his grandmother. Javier gets angry and assaults him again. Inigo tells them that they would push through the case against Javier after this. Feeling as if his father, grandfather, Lora has turned his back on him except Alondra who bailed him out of prison after. Javier goes back to the military camp after Lora finding armoury and drugs inside his car. Jaime compares him to Alexander again. Joaquin growls at him and Javier tells him that it wasn't his, Joaquin tells his son that drug possession can't bail him out. He goes back to prison for the second time and has no way out. As he is drove to jail he escapes from the police and runs away bringing more suspicion that he is in fact guilty. He is trapped by his brother and hits him. After the attack, no leads were found to help find him. In Minsan May Impostor it is revealed that he is impersonating Alexander and is planning to take everything he's ever wanted including Gabrielle. It is also revealed that Alondra has helped him and made the plan so that Javier would be free from prison. He takes advantage of Alexander's name and eventually cools off with Krista. He uses this break up to get closer to Gabrielle and gets drunk and kisses her. While he tries to stop Gabrielle from leaving he tells her that he loves her and gets suspected that he is acting like Javier. He panics and immediately calls Alondra for help. He goes back to camp still having Alexander's name and finds out that Gabrielle is missing, he immediately calls Alondra concerning this who lies to him and says she has nothing to do with it. Javier panics and tells her to hurt any one else but not Gabrielle. Meanwhile, he visits Alexander and falls unconscious after Alexander hit him and took his revenge. Alexander finally has taken his name up and in reverse of events, he gets locked up in the cage. Alexander and Krista decides that they would keep Javier in for a while because his life will be in danger considering Diego, Ibon and Tiago's plan of revenge. Alondra helps him escape and meanwhile hides somewhere else from the military and her family. He asks if they've found Gabrielle and tells him that she has been found dead and that Tomas killed her but refuses to believe. He sneaks into her funeral which proves what they've been telling him. Before he gets caught, he runs off and finds Tomas face to face and does what he does best and takes his revenge. He finds out what Lora and Joaquin has done to Alondra and tells her to stay with him so that he could protect her not knowing that Lora's is his real mother and vows revenge. Alondra plays with his mind and tells him that they need to kill Alexander. He goes to Inigo's house in search for a gun and overhears Inigo and his friends insulting him, he takes as much guns as he can and takes his revenge by giving a tip to the police of their location and that they have a large number of guns in storage. Alondra calls him and informs him that she has captured Alexander and is back at the same building where they kept him captive when it really is Lora. Javier tells her to wait for him and that he would personally pull the trigger not knowing that it isn't his brother. He goes to the warehouse, with Lora escaping and Alondra in her position, Lora tapes her mouth so that she couldn't speak but is thoughtless of what might happen to her, Javier talks to her as if she's Alexander and Alondra tries to defend herself by kicking him which caused him to shoot. Alexander comes in unexpectedly and is confused on who is masked and later finds out that he has shot Alondra. Alondra tells him to escape and immediately hits his brother but doesn't fall out of consciousness. Javier finally surrenders as Lora and his whole family tells the truth that Lora is in fact his mother not Alondra and decides to sacrifice himself to be with his family despite the consequences. He is proven not guilty of the drugs and gun that Inigo and his friends planted on him. He asks forgiveness to his brother, Lora, Joaquin, Krista and his grandfather and is welcomed back to the family. Meanwhile, they find out that Alondra is in the hands of the rebels and wants to save her, Alexander steps in his shoes and pretends to be him but comes in later revealing that he isn't Alexander. They fail to save Alondra because in shortage of time. Diego takes his revenge and shoots him and his brother immediately runs him away from the building before it explodes. A year after, he is seen to be alive and is happy to have a complete family just as he always dreamt.

=== Kaye Villanueva ===
Kaye "Krista" Villanueva-Del Tierro (Maja Salvador) Like other rebels in the group, she is an orphan. She witnessed the death of her parents under the attack of the military. She is a tough girl whose courage and combat skills match those of the men in the rebel camp. Feisty and witty, she refuses to dwell on the sad side of life, She has two missions in life: Fulfill the romance of her life with her fellow rebel Javier and to avenge her parents' death. Though In Season 1, this changes as she discovers that Alexander is the one that she loves. As she gets captured by the military she decides to take on amnesty to be with her boyfriend. She also confronts Gabrielle and threatens her about her relationship with Alexander. She constantly convinces her brother, Tiago who is in jail to take on amnesty so he could get out of prison and be with her again.

In Season 2, she and Gabrielle took their differences aside and became friends until she finds the pictures of her hugging Alexander. Obviously, jealous and furious, Kaye stormed to the military camp and made a scene embarrassing Jaime in front of his company. It was not until Alexander ordered a group of soldiers with letters on their back that spelt "Mahal Kita" (lit. I Love You) that she learnt to forgive him. As she was brought to the party without Alexander informing her that she wasn't invited, Jaime asks for a dance and it was then that she was insulted leading her to exit the party screaming at Alexander. Alexander once again apologizes, this time she denies his apology. She also refuses to marry Alexander, even if she told Javier that she really wanted to. She eventually gives in and agrees to marry Alexander when he proposes to her by using his permission of hiring a plane to fly over a banner asking her to marry him. She tells her brother the news for which his brother refuses, eventually he comes to the house welcoming and forces Krista to leave the house as he and the other rebels, Ka Diego and Ka Ibon has planned to take revenge from the betrayers. Fortunately she managed to get out of the house and was not involved in the attack but forces herself back in for her fiancée and for Remedios and Lora. She talks to Remedios before her death about her wedding and that she was supposed to be their future child's godmother. Krista promises to her that she would take care of Alexander. She helps Lora to pack Remedios' things up before Remedios' funeral. Krista argues with Alexander who growled at her for bad mouthing his best friend Gabrielle while they were having breakfast and could not go on and plan their wedding. She visits Alexander and tells him why they're always fighting and that he has changed, he talks to him and asks if he still loves her leading to her giving the engagement ring back to Alexander who really is Javier to try and cool off. Krista meanwhile visits the Del Tierro house and finds out about the kiss between Gabrielle and Javier still pretending to be Alexander. She informs everyone that there would be no wedding anymore. She goes back home to her brother and tells him about Alexander's betrayal and later visits Lora and tells her that they would be moving because she can't handle all the drama anymore. Krista suspects that Javier is in Diego and Ibon's hands longing for their revenge. Positive of her decision of leaving, she re-visits Tomas and Lora and says goodbye for the final time refusing to say goodbye to Alexander. As she leaves for the province, Alexander catches up to her and begs her not to leave and finally do so after Alexander tells her about Javier who captured and pretended to be him. She is overjoyed that Alexander never stopped loving her and visits Javier and tells him to straighten up his life. She meanwhile comes back home only overhearing his brother, Diego and Ibon's plan for revenge. She decides to stick close to her brother so they won't be too suspicious that they know of their plans. Meanwhile, knowing that Javier has escaped the two try to find ways to discover who helped him and is confused whether it is really Alondra based on what they've found out. Alexander tells her that pushing through this investigation would affect her brother and that he would be sentenced for lifetime imprisonment. Krista goes to Gabrielle's funeral and talks to Gabrielle's grandfather telling him that before she died, they fixed things between them and that she has forgotten what he did to her parents and has forgiven him. She serves as a witness who overheard Diego and Ibon's plans of killing Javier and also sacrifices her brother, Tiago involved in the group. She meanwhile finds out that Alexander is after Javier and immediately goes to the village bringing her life in danger. She finally finds Alexander and successfully resists the danger. Javier apologises to her and immediately forgives him after all, they're best friends. The series jumps a year after with Alexander and Krista having their wedding and are happy parents of twin brothers.

=== Gabrielle Marcelo ===
Gabrielle "Gabby" Marcelo (Andi Eigenmann) – Her parents were both military soldiers who died in the lines of duty. Her grandfather, Gen. Marcelo, raised her after her parents' death. She is an intelligent military officer and Alexander's childhood friend. She is the object of Berto's affection but her heart belongs to Alexander. Unfortunately Alexander only sees her as a friend.

In Season 2, her character received more exposure with the love triangle between Alexander and Krista also with Javier who constantly visits her and asks her to go out with him for which she refuses to as she doesn't feel the same way. Her character has been constantly attacked by Krista because of Kaye's jealousy of how close she is with her boyfriend. She creates a bond with Berto who comforts her when she is hurt, mainly because of her feelings for Alexander. She visits Kaye at work and asks her to put their differences aside, it was then that they started becoming friends until Kaye's confrontation concerning the picture of her with Alexander this leads Gen. Jaime ordering her to be Alexander's date for an upcoming party, she refuses and chooses to ask Javier instead as she doesn't want to meddle in Kaye and Alexander's relationship and that she doesn't want to fight with Kaye anymore. Her rejection to Javier and her closeness to Alexander causes the twins to further drive apart. She confronts Kaye and asks her to forgive Alexander although Kaye questions why she would do such a thing as it would be a perfect chance for her and Alexander to end up together. She develops a deep friendship with Javier which helps him to turn his life back on the right track. Even though Javier and Alexander have the same face, he still feels different for the brothers and still loves Alexander. Gabrielle, along with Berto are assigned to investigate on the attack of the General's family. She discovers that Inigo Suarez has been freed from prison and is one of the suspects of the attack with the rebels Diego, Tiago, and Ibon. As Javier is put to jail, Gabrielle sees him and looks at him, disappointed. She works with the PNP to help capture Javier, in their chase she saves and pulls Alexander from a car and falls on top of him. Afterwards Alexander got closer to her mysteriously getting Kaye jealous. She walks off from Alexander who really is Javier after he tells her that he knows she still loves him. Gabrielle still stands by Alexander's side and sees Krista's engagement ring with Alexander, she comforts him and goes to a club, Javier pretending to be Alexander gets drunk and she helps him go back home and reaches his bedroom. Javier pulls her close and couldn't resist but to let him kiss her. She runs off after Alondra and Joaquin has walked in. She later asks Berto to speak to her because she needs some guidance. She goes to her grandfather and files to leave duty to have some time to think things through. Edgardo gives her granddaughter his medal of valor, the highest medal for a soldier to receive. She visits Krista at work and tells her that she has asked to be assigned away from Alexander and apologises. Krista tells her that she doesn't need to do this because she won't get back together with him. She leaves the camp and sees Alexander who really is Javier and forces her to stay. He tells her that he loves her not Krista raising suspicion that he isn't the real Alexander. She follows Javier visiting the abandoned warehouse where they've kept Alexander. She suspects that foul play has been involved and calls Berto but before she can even tell her where she is, her battery dies but manages to tell him that it wasn't Javier that she saw but Tomas. She finds Mimi who fortunately made up an alibi. She asks to borrow her phone to call for back up. Mimi stabs her at the back with an ax lying on the ground and loses consciousness. Fighting for her life, Gabrielle wakes up in pain and loses plenty of blood after Alondra, Mimi and Javier have drove off. She crawls inside the building and finds Alexander tied up in a locked cage. Alexander crawls to her and reaches his hand between the gate and holds her hand as she slowly closed her eyes and passes away, dying in front of her best friend and the person she truly loves. She comes back spiritually in Javier's dreams and is disappointed that he didn't fulfill his promise of changing. Gabrielle tells him that he's wrong on thinking that no one loves him and that his family loves him even if they're not showing it. She tells her not to be jealous of what Alexander has but to embrace the things he has. Gabrielle asks him to change back to the nice and joyful Javier everyone and even she loved. In Minsan Mahanap Ang Katawan her body is found and Tomas is framed for her death. In the following episode a grand funeral is held for her with the people close to her attending.

=== Noberto Matias ===
Norberto "Berto" Matias (Martin del Rosario) A graduate of Military Academy and an explosive expert. He dreams of earning the approval of his superiors and rising above the ranks. In Season 1 he is introduced as Alexander's loyal friend and he is deeply in love with Gabrielle. This changes for which he competes with the brothers for Gabrielle's heart. Like Javier, he is constantly trying to ruin Alexander's name and trying to get him in trouble. Through his great jealousy and desperately wanting Gabrielle's affection, he pushes a case versus Alexander in the name of the society concerning his connections with the rebels, fortunately Alexander was plead not guilty for the accusations and was not sent to jail.

In Season 2, he creates a bond with Gabrielle, just as he wanted after Alexander focusing on his girlfriend Kaye. That he envies Alexander and the recent suspicion of Javier being involved in car theft business, he tries to make people think as if he's just trying to ruin his own brother's name by taking Javier's side and telling people Alexander's only doing this because he is jealous of Javier's strong relationship with their mother. He snitches on Javier that Gabrielle is only befriending him as requested by Alexander. He befriends Javier in order to ruin Alexander, he tells Javier that he has no chance with Gabrielle because she still has feelings for his brother. He does this because he himself also is in love with Gabrielle. He tells Gabrielle to stop loving Alexander because he is engaged. Berto meanwhile raises suspicion on Alexander's change. He discovers about Gabrielle's kiss with Alexander (Javier) and tells her that it is all her fault because she didn't even try to refuse and since then decides to ignore her. Eventually he gives in and tells Gabrielle that she kissed him back and did not try to stop it. Like always, Berto tells her not to force herself to someone who doesn't love her back. Gabrielle feels as if even he's turning his back on her. He tells her that for years he's given himself to her just like what she did for Alexander and feels as if he is invincible besides him. He tells her that after she kept refusing he realised that he will never be with her, and that Gabrielle has thrown out and damaged her pride because of her affection for Alexander. Berto tells her that he doesn't want to be like her waiting for nothing. Berto asks Javier pretending to be Alexander to fix things between them and just try to help find Gabrielle. Berto is ordered to investigate on Tomas and finds out about his past, his deceased wife and child and that Tomas was adopted. He discusses with the real Alexander what happened before Gabrielle's disappearance and told Alexander about Gabrielle feeling ashamed of her grandfather, Alexander's family and Krista and that she is the victim. Meanwhile, he reports back with no information about Gabrielle, with Edgardo furious he shouts at him and is disappointed that he hasn't found anything and all that he can report back is nothing. They receive a tip of where Gabrielle is and finds her body, heartbroken he turns back while Alexander takes his last minute with her while tears ran down his face. In Gabrielle's funeral he shares his experiences and first impression on Gabrielle, thinking that she only got in because of her connections with the superiors but he was proven wrong. He sees her as a strong and committed person and is one of the person that he trusts with his life, he finishes off saying that it has been an honour fighting besides her. Berto meanwhile finds out that Mimi and Tomas are related. As Tomas escapes from prison and that Lora has gone missing, he suspects that Tomas has captured her and helps Alexander find them. He takes Lora away from Tomas from any other danger and also fails to stop the bomb planted around Alondra. Berto is last seen attending Lora and Joaquin and Alexander and Krista's wedding as one of the soldiers standing by the benches.

== Supporting cast ==
=== Alondra Del Tierro ===
Alondra Sebastiano-Del Tierro (Lorna Tolentino) The glamorous daughter of Gen. Jaime Sebastiano. A shrewd and ambitious businesswoman, she was able to transform their family's jewelry business into a jewelry empire. A doting wife to her husband Joaquin but an unaffectionate mother to Alexander. A vicious woman, she can stand up to anyone but cowers from her father and her husband. Her worst fear is that of her husband leaving her for good. Throughout Season 1 and 2 we see her winning victory as opposed to her sister. She has Joaquin, Alexander, and their father. Her friend Mimi helps her to keep the secret of Alexander and Javier being Lora's twins even though she's developed feelings for Javier emotionally. She tries to throw this out by continually telling herself that she doesn't love him and that he's only using Javier to keep Joaquin from loving Lora again. Mimi talks to Alondra concerning Remedios' death. She is jealous of Lora's growing relationship with their father and still thinks as if Remedios death was a favour to Lora to get back to their family. Alondra tells Mimi that the fight is not over and one has to go down between one of them and that is Lora. Before Remedios death she talks to Remedios and tells her to rest so she won't get involved in the upcoming fight. Because to her the fight hasn't ended. It just begun. She talks to her husband and tells him that he won't be such an obstacle by befriending Lora for him. After Remedios' funeral, she speaks to her half-sister Lora and extended her condolences and that she has experienced her position when her mother died. She tells her that if she is ready to make peace she is there. As part of her plan, Alondra begs her father not to send Javier to jail but fails to get what she wants. Javier calls for her to save him and makes a plan to impersonate Alexander and take him to an abandoned building in the forest far from Manila. She also plans to make the secret of Alexander and Javier being Lora's twins more stronger so that no one can find out the truth. As Lora comes back home she irritates her purposely and fights and argues with her constantly sometimes leading to a physical fight. Alondra gets a call from Javier telling her that Gabrielle has raised suspicion on him. Tomas overhears this and asks if she's talking to Javier, she later covers this with the help of Mimi. She later reveals to her best friend that Javier has been roaming around freely and is in fact impersonating Alexander. Mimi tells her that she killed Gabrielle and says that she doesn't want to be part of their crime anymore as she is feeling too guilty. Alondra tells her that if she even tries and thinks of doing so, she will bury her next to Gabrielle with her cousin, Tomas. Not knowing that Alexander has captured Javier and taken his name back, she gives Alexander a hint unintentionally that she is working with Javier. This is later proven when she sees Alexander and congratulates him for portraying himself so well thinking that he's Javier. Meanwhile, she suspects that her best friend, Mimi is planning to do something unplanned. Alondra later warns Tomas that if he is planning something that will reveal their secrets, she would kill Lora and that Tomas would be sent to jail. Alondra later finds out that Mimi has escaped and is frightened that they would tell the truth. She frames Tomas of killing Gabrielle so that he could not tell the truth of their secret by taking Tomas' watch and planting it on Gabrielle's burial site. Tomas tells her that Lora has found out that she has given birth and he has hid her sons from her. To keep the truth from unveiling, she immediately tips the military and frames Tomas of Gabrielle's murder. The military are confused of why Tomas would murder Gabrielle as they have no connection bringing Alondra nervous that they'd somehow find out. She overhears Alexander talking over the phone and finds out that he really is Alexander and not Javier. She immediately visits the warehouse thinking that they have kept them there and takes Javier and hides him somewhere else. Alexander suspects that it was her that helped Javier escape. She visits Javier and tells him that Alexander is the real enemy. The truth of her lie later unravels and her life is out of balanced as Tomas runs into her car and threatens that he would kill her but later crashes. She comes back and finds out that her family has found out of her crime that Alexander and Javier are Joaquin and Lora's sons and Joaquin leaves her for good. Lora confronts her and Alondra begs her not to take Joaquin from her; Lora slaps her and assures her that she would take back everything from her. Alondra brings up that she and Joaquin are married and if Lora takes her she would be a mistress. But after all she's done, Lora tells her that Joaquin would obviously separate from her. With every one except Javier not knowing about their secret, turning their backs on her. Alondra calls Javier and tells her that Joaquin have left her and Lora slapped her continuously after supposedly blaming her for Gabrielle's death and still sees Javier as her dead son, Jaime Jr. and plans to kill Alexander with the help of Javier. Now wanted, she sneaks in the military camp and sees Joaquin and Lora hugging and falling back on each other's arms thus causing her to seek for revenge. She sneaks into the Del Tierro Mansion, and is seen by a member of Diego's rebel army, and takes a pair of guns. She goes into Lora's room and hits her with the two guns and Lora falls out of consciousness. She immediately takes her in her vehicle and faces Tomas and escapes, she holds Lora in captive at the same warehouse that they captured Alexander and changes her clothes to Alexander's military uniform and lies to Javier that she has captured Alexander. Alondra covers Lora's face to make it more convincing and so that Javier would pull the trigger. Her plan falls apart as Lora wakes up and in a reverse of events, Lora captures her and ties her up and covers her mouth thus causing her not to shout when Javier comes in and shoots her. Javier eventually finds out and is frightened, she tells him to escape before he is captured and runs off herself before the military came, she treats herself and takes a gun from Javier's bag planning to shoot Lora but doesn't anyway after witnessing the truth has come out to Javier. She runs off and realises that her family has turned their backs on her as if no one loves her thus causing her to almost shoot herself but is still assured that Joaquin is still hers but falls in the rebels arms to get hold of Javier and his family. She is surprised to hear that they would come and help her after all her wrongdoings. The rebels covers her with bombs and the military fail to stop it. She begs her family to leave the building before they run out of time and asks forgiveness to her family especially Lora, Alexander and Joaquin and lastly God. Jaime Jr. visits her spiritually and asks her to come home with him to heaven as the bombs explode.

=== Joaquin Del Tierro ===
Col. Joaquin Del Tierro (John Estrada) – Orphaned at a young age, Gen. Jaime Sebastiano took him under his wing and reared him to adulthood and military service. This is where he met his beautiful but scheming wife Alondra and they had a child, Alexander. They are the epitome of a perfect family, or so it seems. He is an honest and principled man but Joaquin's main struggle is to keep his family intact, with him leading the way and not overbearing father-in-law interfering with his every decision. When they were just young adults he always loved Lora more than Alondra as Alondra served as the third wheel but after hearing the news that Lora died, he eventually falls into Alondra's arms but after this he still doesn't love her until Alondra comes back home from the states and brings a baby supposedly theirs (Alexander) which leads him to marrying her even if he still loves Lora. Eventually he finds out the truth about Javier being his son and gets a hard time getting close to him. Javier feels as if his love for him won't be equal as to Alexander. Meanwhile, In Season 2, Lora sacrifices herself in hope to be with her family especially her mother, Remedios. He draws closure to Lora by talking to her concerning why she left and never came back, he finds out that she came back after her coma straight to him but found out about his marriage with Alondra and their baby. As hard as it is, he leaves Lora and goes back to Alondra because they are married even if he still has strong feelings for Lora despite convincing himself that he doesn't. Alexander tells him about the news of his engagement with Krista and eventually organised to visit her family. In the visit, their house is attacked and Remedios unfortunately passes away. Joaquin later gives a long sermon to Javier about changing his ways and using his brain. After all, his grandmother has died because of him being the target. As Lora comes back to the Del Tierro mansion, he gets closer to her but tries to resist the temptation of being emotionally connected to her again. Tomas faces him and tells him that he knows his past with Lora and tells him to stay away. Meanwhile, he finds that Alexander who really is Javier kissing Gabrielle which gives Gabrielle a bad reputation. He later visits Gabrielle with Jaime and thanks her for her service, hearing about her leave. He extends her a good luck and for a safe return. He overhears that Lora and Tomas would be leaving the house and asks Lora to stay and that he would talk to Alondra concerning this. He finds out about the death of Gabrielle and links the pieces they have found and is sure that the missing piece is the person who witnessed the whole thing. Joaquin finds a watch near Gabrielle's burial site and Jaime asks Lora if she recognises it revealing that it belongs to Tomas. As the series nears its end, Joaquin finds out that Alexander and Javier are his son's with Lora, not Alondra and so Joaquin tells her to hire an attorney to finish their marriage and leaves Alondra for good. Lora asks him personally to find their son Javier so that they could have a complete family. He charges to the building and tries to save Alondra but fails to, Alondra tells him to start a new life with Lora and his family. The series jumps a year after celebrating his wedding with Lora and is a happy grandfather to Alexander and Krista's twin boys.

=== Lora Sebastiano ===
Lora "Rosa" Sebastiano-Del Tierro (Amy Austria-Ventura) An educated woman, she left the comforts of city life to become a teacher in the rebel camp. She is married to Bernabe, one of the rebel leaders, and she is a surrogate mother to Javier. One wouldn't mistake her for a rebel; she is one kind and nurturing person. But she will not hesitate to fight back if her family is threatened. She lives with a scar on her stomach from a painful past that she couldn't really remember much of, and maybe one day she will decide to forget. Until now, she still loves Joaquin but is now married to Tomas. Her biggest competition is her sister because she has taken everything from her: Joaquin, their father: Jaime and now Javier. But as she comes back from prison after being framed of taking drugs, she has a chance to take everything back from her, starting from Javier. He confronts Javier and asks for an apology for which Javier refuses, as he turns his back from her, heartbroken she tells him that he should have killed her instead of telling her that he doesn't love her. After the visit, the rebels Diego and Ibon prepare to attack the house from the adjacent apartment. Unfortunately she gets shot along with her mother. They are rushed to the hospital and the bullets are successfully taken out. Meanwhile, she asks everyone if her mother is okay; her father who came outside the visiting tells her that Remedios is in a critical state, for which the father and daughter hugged and cried everything out. Through her mother's tragic accident, she gets closer to her father once again who comforts her. As Alondra speaks with her she tells her to never compare her mother to hers as they aren't the same and she refuses to make peace as she knows her moves and knows that she is up to something. Javier visits her and asks for apology because he made a mistake. She ignores him and refuses to believe him and accept his apology remembering from the time he said in Season 1 to leave him alone and stop meddling with his business. After another attack, the military escorts saves them and suspects that they are after Javier as they weren't attacked for a few days until his visit. She goes inside Javier's car and finds a gun and drugs that Inigo and his friends planted on him bringing more suspicion that the attack and her mother's death was his fault. Eventually, Lora and Tomas lives in the Del Tierro house with a warm welcome from everyone including Alondra. Meanwhile, her scar on her stomach relieves pain again. Jaime sends a professional doctor to check on her leaving Tomas and Alondra panicking that they'll find out about their secret. Tomas fortunately didn't get to stop her from visiting the clinic and finds out that she is still able to be pregnant. Knowing this and her desire to have a child she tells Tomas that she wants to have a baby. She visits the doctors again for another check up and concerns Tomas that she'd know about their secret. Tomas tries to stop her, raising suspicion that he is hiding something from her. Lora pushes through with the test anyway and finds out that she has given birth while she was in her coma. She confronts Tomas concerning this and had no choice but to tell the truth. Lora interrogates him and asks where her sons are and where he hid them. She also finds out that he was responsible of the drugs that was planted on her and is determined to find where her sons are. She later finds out that Alexander and Javier are in fact her sons with Joaquin, her true love. Lora confronts Alondra and slaps her four times; for her mother; for herself and for kidnapping her twins. She tells the news that Alondra is also responsible for her coma and tells Jaime that she would be pressing charges against her with the help of Joaquin. Lora visits Tomas knowing about the truth and giving him the news that she would be pressing charges and Tomas gives her the whole truth and also leaves him for good with no need to file for divorce because their marriage is not legal. She tells him that she would forget about him and would treat him as if he was a bad dream. Alondra kidnaps her after seeing her hugging Joaquin and hits her with two guns. She is held captive by her half-sister in the same warehouse where Alexander was captured. Alondra changes her clothes to Alexander's military uniform and wears the same mask to make her look like a soldier and make it seem like she's Alexander so that Javier would shoot. Fortunately before Javier arrived, she wakes up and in a reverse of events, she captures and ties Alondra up and escapes but is held at gunpoint and surrounded by Diego and Ibon's army of rebels. She witnesses the death of Tomas and finds Javier aiming at Alexander and finally tells him the truth that she is in fact his mother. The rebels informs them that they have Alondra with them and sacrifices herself for her sister. She tries to save Alondra but fails to and forgives her for all her wrongdoings. After a year, she is seen marrying Joaquin and is a happy grandmother to Alexander and Kaye's twin brother and having a completer family and is happy that Javier is back with them.

=== Tomas Sta. Maria ===
Tomas "Bernabe" Sta. Maria (Tonton Gutierrez) An officer of the rebel troupe, he serves as a medicine man of the camp. He lost his wife and child in a fire years ago and it was in that incident that he met his wife Rosa. They found each other and together joined the camp. He is also Javier's surrogate father. A very principled and reliable man but unknowingly, he harbors a secret past one that continues to haunt him. He is part of Alondra and Mimi's scam when they took Lora's twins after Lora being in a coma for about a year. Throughout the series, his conscience kills him into telling the truth of Javier and Alexander's identity but the only thing keeping it a secret is that if he reveals this, Lora will leave him for good. Before Remedios' death he talks to her knowing that when she gets to heaven, she would know of all the lies he has kept. He promises her that he would love Lora forever and that he only did those things because he doesn't want her to leave him. After the attack he is at Lora's side every time and sees Javier as he gets sent to jail for drug possession and illegal armoury. Tomas confronts Lora if she still loves Joaquin with Lora heartbroken that he doesn't trust her enough she tells him that he doesn't deserve the answer to that and storms out. He talks to Alondra about Lora and Joaquin's affection and Alondra tells him to stop threatening each other and to work together to keep their spouses. He meanwhile finds out about Alondra and Javier's mishap and Alexander kept in captive. He hides in the trunk of Alondra and Javier's vehicle to find out where they've kept Alexander. He witnesses Alexander kept in captive by Alondra and Javier. He later escapes and unfortunately didn't have enough time to go back and hide in the trunk. A series of flashback hits him involving the crime he has done with Alondra and Mimi. He runs back to the warehouse to help save Gabrielle who has been stabbed by Mimi and finds that she has escaped. He hears Alexander shouting for help but instead decides not to help them as he does not want to lose Lora. He becomes a suspect responsible for Gabrielle missing and becomes more suspicious to everyone as he is investigated concerning his history. Meanwhile, he goes with Lora to the clinic and tries to stop her from doing the check up but later had no choice but to let her do it. Her cousin Mimi calls concerning her paranoia and that she wants to run away as soon as possible, he tells her not to because they're lives are also in danger now that Lora may know the truth. He tells her that it might be time to pay for their sins and that God wants the truth to unveil. He immediately calls Alondra telling her that Lora has found out that she has given birth and it is only a matter of time that she'd know who her sons are. Alondra frames him for killing Gabrielle, burying his watch along with Gabrielle's body and is immediately sent to jail with no one believing him as he tries to tell the truth of what really happened. He sneaks into Gabrielle's funeral and faces Javier who immediately punches him. The military sees him giving Javier time to escape, he immediately runs away from the soldiers and hides behind a damaged vehicle for which he reminisces on what he has done and what the possible consequences would be leaving Lora alone with Alondra and manages to escape. Tomas threatens to kill Alondra but is rushed to the hospital leaving him in the hands of the military. Tomas wakes up and Gen. Edgardo confronts him of why he killed Gabrielle and reveals that it was Mimi, Lora visits him and says that she would be leaving him and would be pressing charges. Edgardo refuses to believe so and is sent to jail and begs to be freed, frightened that Alondra would kill Lora. He pretends to have suffered blood loss and falls on the ground and is called for an ambulance, he escapes and drives off with the vehicle to stop Alondra from doing harm to Lora. He sees Alondra taking Lora, out of consciousness, in her vehicle. Diego and his rebel army sees him and drives after Alondra. He tells Diego to drive to the warehouse where Alondra has possibly kept Lora. He escapes as they see Lora driving off and eventually sees Lora at gunpoint, frightened that she'd get shot, she runs to her and covers for her and gets shot. He dies in the arms of Lora and saves her from Diego, who continuously shot him painfully to death.

=== Remedios Sebastiano ===
Remedios "Elena" Sebastiano (Boots Anson-Roa) She came from a family of rebels. But she turned her back on the movement when she fell in love, which led to her parents' death. Living what would have been her dream of a normal life with the man she married, she sadly discovered that change wasn't going to take place that the decadent system still prevailed. She decided to go back to the mountains with her daughter Rosa to escape the hurt and betrayal caused by her husband. Now that she lives beyond the mountains because of taking amnesty, she has no choice but to see her former husband Jaime once again bringing painful memories. She gets shot at the visiting and is rushed to the hospital. Her family is informed that she has loss a severe amount of blood and has hit her lungs, one bullet has also hit her head causing her into a critical state. The doctors tell her family that she is suffering from subdural hematoma and that she doesn't have much time left. In Minsan Lang May Mamatay she visits Javier spiritually in prison. She wakes up after Lora and Jaime have spoken to her for a few seconds, looking at her daughter. She later closes her eyes and dies. Remedios was buried straight ahead to avoid the press from meddling.

=== Jaime Sebastiano ===
Gen. Jaime Sebastiano (Ronaldo Valdez) The Vice Chief of Staff of the Armed Forces, he has served as adviser to the country's past presidents. He considers himself as a soldier above all else. He prioritizes his duty to his country over his family, his friends, even himself. His word is the law and he instills fear in the hearts of many. He rules with an iron fist, especially to his grandson, the reluctant soldier Alexander. He will protect his family name and reputation at all cost. In Minsan May Trahedyang Wawasak Ng Mga Puso, he is heartbroken about the news of his former wife, Remedios and is happy for Lora. He talks to her daughter and assures her that he will cover all the hospital bills and help them as they are still family and that he isn't a bad person. This incident brought Jaime closer back to her daughter Lora's arms whom he tries to comfort. He signs the papers that states that the doctors won't try to save her if she loses her breath again instead of Lora who was crushed of the happening. He asks Joaquin, taking care of Remedios funeral for it to be held as soon as possible to keep the press away. Meanwhile, Jaime visits Lora, Tomas and Kaye and asks Lora to come with him. Lora refuses to come as one of her reasons will be leaving Krista. Jaime apologises to Krista and asks her to come with them along with Tomas and welcomes her to the family. Jaime tells Lora that they are not safe at the place they are living at as of now and tells her to come and live with him. He finds out of Gabrielle and Javier pretending to be Alexander's scandal and confronts Gabrielle telling her that she's never been disappointed, knowing that Gabby has a good reputation. Jaime tells her that she is a disgrace to the military uniform and her family. Meanwhile, he finds out that Gabrielle is missing and immediately helps and calls for search ignoring the 24-hour rule. Jaime later tells Edgardo that they have no choice but to let Tomas free with his alibi. Jaime tells Edgardo to prepare himself in case Gabrielle doesn't come back. Jaime gets a tip of where Gabrielle has been buried and immediately runs to the crime scene. After the funeral, they head back to the headquarters and is informed that Tomas has escaped. Furious, he asks what is happening with the group that even Javier is still missing. He vows revenge on Diego, Ibon and Tiago. Jaime finds out that Alondra stole Alexander and Javier from Lora which leaves him turning his back on her daughter. He changes the charges on Alondra and Javier and is now wanted. Meanwhile, he finds out that Alondra is held captive by the rebels and comes to the building and finds her daughter strapped with bombs, he refuses to go as he is told that they would run out of time, crushed that he would need to leave his daughter. A year after, he is a retired soldier and has given his seat to Edgardo.

=== Edgardo Marcelo ===
Gen. Edgardo P. Marcelo (Dante Rivero) Jaime's long-time friend and confidante is an honest, principled and liberal soldier. A grandfather to Gabrielle, he is the only man who can stand up to and reason with Jaime Sebastiano. While visiting Remedios in the hospital, he tells her that he wished that she could've loved her instead of his friend Jaime. He regrets ever introducing her to him. Jaime overhears this and asks him why he's never told him that he had feelings for his ex-wife. He tells Jaime that he didn't share this as he knows that Remedios is already in love with him. He attends Remedios' funeral. Edgardo finds out about Gabrielle and Javier pretending to be Alexander's scandal. Disappointed, he gives a long sermon and hurts her grand daughter verbally by saying that she sounds desperate. He later comforts and embraces Gabrielle. Meanwhile, Gabrielle hands him a file of leave and he later gives her granddaughter his medal of valor (the highest award that a military could get) emphasising that she is the most important thing in his life. Meanwhile, he suspects that something bad has happened and looks for Gabrielle. Berto tells him that she has gone on and followed Javier portraying Alexander suspecting that something wrong is going on that she can't point out. He listens to Tomas pledge as he is the suspect of Gabrielle's case. He tells him that if anything happened to his granddaughter, Tomas will be the one to pay for it. He convinces himself that nothing bad has happened to his only granddaughter and family. They eventually find Gabrielle's vehicle and suspect that she isn't the last to use it considering that the car's been wiped with no signs of fingerprints, even Gabrielle's; the police finds Gabrielle's things and Edgardo sees that her granddaughter has still kept a picture of her and Alexander. The police tell him the possibility that Gabrielle left the car to turn back on her life, or she got kidnapped or that she might be dead. Edgardo refuses to believe so and convinces himself that her granddaughter can't be dead. Edgardo comes with the troops to where Gabrielle has been supposedly found dead and sees that his granddaughter is lifeless. He immediately looks away and mourns in pain, asking why it had to be Gabrielle and wishes that it was him instead of her and vows revenge for the person who did this to his granddaughter and eventually finds Tomas' watch for which he was framed for killing Gabrielle. He organises his granddaughter's funeral straight away before he loses strength. He talks in his behalf in Gabrielle's funeral and shares that fourteen years ago he held a funeral for Gabrielle's parents: Capt. Roberto Marcelo and his wife 1st Lt. Margarita Marcelo who both died in the line of duty. Gabrielle was just 10 years old when she promised that she would continue her parents' fight and fulfilled her promise. He decides that he would cremate her granddaughter and is given her ashes and Gabrielle's own Philippine flag. As Tomas is captured, he confronts him and asks why he killed Gabrielle when it should have been him and calls him a coward. Mimi goes to them and sacrifices herself and reveals that she is indeed the one responsible for his granddaughter's murder. A year after, he has forgiven Tomas and Mimi and is promoted to Vice Chief of Staff with Jaime retiring from duty.

== Extended ==
=== Mimi Estrella ===
Miranda "Mimi" Estrella (Candy Pangilinan) – Alondra's long-time best friend and an employee of Alondra's jewelry business. She is not just a best friend but like a sidekick and has been there witnessing all her wrongdoings and being a part of them. She knows about Alondra causing Lora's car accident and is also a part of when Lora was in a coma for about a year and taking Alexander with them. Since then she has kept this secret and has learned of Alondra's actions and what she is capable of doing. She gives the story a bit of light and comedy and tries to make every serious situation and turn it to a not-so-serious position. She is the one who killed Gabrielle accidentally in order to save her best friend Alondra. Mimi comes back to the warehouse at night in disguise and drags Gabrielle's body away ignoring Alexander suspecting that she's Javier, she covers Gabrielle and takes her body in the middle of the forest and buries her. Feeling guilty, she tells Alondra that she wants to put an end to this and meanwhile calls Tomas for help but refuses to sacrifice herself feeling as if she'd die in prison. Meanwhile, a group of police visits the building of the jewellery store, paranoid, Mimi tries to hide herself even if they weren't looking for her, finally she calls help from her cousin Tomas and feels as if her conscience is killing her and her paranoia, she plans to run off from her mistakes but Tomas tells her that she killed Gabrielle and she can't hide from that forever because someday they'll find out. Mimi decides to run off anyway scared of Alondra and that she'd go to prison. Mimi returns to the picture with Adele who helps her to sacrifice herself for the murder of Gabrielle.

=== Diego Pamintuan ===
Julian "Diego" Pamintuan (Ronnie Lazaro) is the former head of the rebel group until Javier tore them apart. He vows revenge to him and his family after betraying their group. He along with his brother Ibon with Tiago are later captured and after months of being in prison in the military camp, they decide to take on amnesty to be freed and to take their revenge. He informs Tiago that they would take all the people that betrayed their cause including his sister Krista. Krista is left out of the act not knowing that she was helping but sees that the house has been attacked. Tomas and the others visit them and suspect that they were the ones involved and acts as if they didn't know anything about it. The military held a test on the three to see if they were using armoury but tested negative. Diego and Ibon attack the house again after aiming for Javier putting Tomas and Lora's life in danger. Fortunately no one gets hurt. They are still not over and plan to kill Javier after they've killed the rest. Tomas falls into their arms after trying to catch after Alondra who has kidnapped Lora to fulfill their plan of killing them one by one. He eventually shoots Tomas to death and kidnaps Alondra to get hold of Lora and Javier. He shoots Javier, but fails to kill him and he eventually dies.

=== Ibon Pamintuan ===
Diosdado "Ibon" Pamintuan (Jojit Lorenzo) is Diego's younger brother and was and still is in love with Krista. Up until the rebel formed their group he has stayed with his brother's side. After the three are freed from prison, they immediately make their plan. Not knowing that Alexander and Krista are engaged. When he found out, he was crushed and immediately wanted to kill Javier's family. After months the three found new members and kidnapped the owners of the adjacent apartment from Remedios' family with the Del Tierro's including Javier visiting. He aims to shoot Javier but unfortunately shoots Remedios who saved him from the bullet. The three were then suspected of the act but the soldier failed to prove so. Javier charges in their house and attacks Ibon, getting him furious and giving him more reason to kill him. As they hold Alondra in captive he tries to save himself but faces Krista, his love of his life and Javier in the back of him and dies as Javier shoots him in defence.

=== Tiago Villanueva ===
Fidel "Tiago" Villanueva (Lloyd Zaragoza) is Krista's brother who has never turned his back on their principle and like her sister, he seeks revenge to the soldiers that took their parents life. But after Krista turned her back from the rebel's group and took on amnesty, he ignores her. Krista later convinces her brother to take the amnesty so they could be together for which he refuses but after months of begging, he suggests this to Diego and Ibon and agrees to do so to take their revenge. After Diego tells him that Krista will be part of their revenge, he tries to stop this and convinces them to leave Krista out of it. Diego tells him that the only way to do this is that Krista shall help them with their plan. He, Diego and Ibon attends Remedios' funeral and the three form a new group. They're revenge has still not begun. He visits her sister again and asks him to go with him. Krista refuses to leave Lora at this time of grief. He calls Diego and Ibon to take their revenge on them after Javier came in but to give him time to take Krista away from the house. As his sister tells him about Alexander's betrayal, he forces her not to see him again, and if so he would kill him. He even recommends her sister to love Ibon instead knowing that they are the same. He drops her sister in the bus terminal and says that he would come the following day, he goes back home not knowing that her sister got out of the bus and met up with Diego and Ibon. Krista and Alexander overhears their plan but kept silent. Krista comes back home and tries to guilt his brother to tell the truth to her but fails to. Tiago meanwhile sees her with Alexander again and makes her choose between him or Alexander but didn't answer. He is meanwhile sent to prison with Ibon and Diego managing to escape. A year after, he has forgiven his sister and attends her wedding freed from one day in prison and walks her sister in the aisle.

=== Lt. Col. Santiago ===
Lt. Col. Santiago (John Apacible)† He played Alexander, Gabrielle and Noberto's chief in Season 1 when they were still new of being a soldier. Santiago plays a very minor role like Adel and has not been part of any tragedies. He is only seen inside the military camp and his character's life is not studied. He is not seen in Season 2 prior to the actor's death.

=== Adele ===
Adele (Frances Makil-Ignacio) is a minor character throughout the series. An employee at Alondra's jewelry business and is constantly arguing and fighting with Mimi. She witnesses Alondra being kidnapped up until Krista was still part of the rebels. Throughout the series she becomes closer to Mimi but hides this from Alondra. They make fun of each other and also brings a lighter side to the story. In Season 2, she snitches on Mimi to Alondra telling her that the former did not go to where she said she'd be going but instead went home to immediately pack her things and escape, bringing her life in danger. Adele helps Mimi sacrifice herself to the authorities and admit that she committed Gabrielle's murder.

== Special participation ==
- Young Alondra Sebastiano (Kim Chiu) Young Alondra never lived a normal life with her family. She never gets to spend time with her father not knowing that her mother was just a mistress. She loves her mother being the only one who can fulfill her promises even though of her mother's commitments and busy life in work. After her graduation, her mother treats her outside and sees her father with another woman. Her mother tells her the truth and refuses to believe this. After the incident, Jaime takes her in with his real family and faces Lora and Remedios. After her mother's death, she changes and is envious of her sister, her jewelry and her boyfriend, Joaquin.
- Young Lora Sebastiano (Erich Gonzales) She loves her mother so much and is in love with Joaquin who she constantly spends time with. She has a bitter relationship with her sister feeling as if Alondra's trying to take everything from her. She doesn't trust her and tells Joaquin to stay away from her.
- Young Joaquin Del Tierro (Xian Lim) After Lora goes away from sometime, he develops a strong relationship with Alondra but still loves Lora. Alondra tries to take him for herself. But when Lora comes back, his attention goes back to Lora. Alondra confronts him thinking that he loves her. He tells Alondra that he never loved her because his feelings for Lora and that he only sees her as a friend.
- Young Jaime Sebastiano (Albert Martinez) He has a weak relationship with his wife, Remedios. After Teressa's death he confronts Remedios about Alondra being his daughter from his mistress.
- Young Remedios Sebastiano (Agot Isidro) After knowing of Jaime's mistress, she leaves him for good. But before this she already knew about Teresa whom confronted her. She tries to convince her of leaving Jaime which she later did.
- Teresa Valderosa (Angel Aquino) has a busy life working but never fails to attend her daughter's most important ceremonies. She tells her daughter that her father doesn't have a mistress because she is the mistress. She runs after her daughter and crashes into a speeding car and dies in her daughter's arms.

== Guest cast ==
- Young Alexander/Young Javier Del Tierro (Nash Aguas) was like the current Javier right now. He disobeys his grandfather but tries to fulfill his expectations. He has never felt close to his mother Alondra and feels as if no one loves him and understands him except his father. He is a kind child with a soft heart, he helps Young Krista escape from military as her parents are captured and is later punished severely standing in the rain. Meanwhile, Young Javier suffered very traumatic incidents, as a kid, Rosa and Bernabe leaves him to a family while they go up to the rebels. He is often smacked and physically assaulted for doing the wrong things and gets punished by getting locked up in an animal's cage
- Young Gabrielle "Gabby" Marcelo (Mika dela Cruz) When she was just turning 10 years old, her parents died in the lines of war after promising that they will come back to celebrate. Her grandfather tells her that it will be okay and in order to make her feel better he tells her that her parents died as heroes. Since then she's been living with her grandfather and developed a very strong relationship. She meets Alexander and becomes his best friend and develops feelings for him as they grow up, but Alexander never felt the same
- Young Kaye "Krista" Villanueva (Khaycee Aboloc) is first seen trying to escape from the hands of military. Alexander saves her and she tells him that he's one of the kindest people she's ever met. She tells him about her parents being captured by the military. She along with her parents later escape and run back to the forest. She witnesses her parents' death and has since vowed revenge to the military, Gen. Edgardo Marcelo, that killed them
- Jaime Del Tierro, Jr. (Bugoy Cariño) Jaime Jr, biologically, is Alondra's only son, he is seen in the pilot episode bringing happiness to the Del Tierro family and longs to be a soldier like his father and grand father. He has a strong relationship with his brother Alexander and often helps his brother get over things that upset him. At night he convinces Alexander that he'd tag along with him to his secret place where there are fireflies. He tries to catch them and is hit by a car and is rushed to the hospital where he dies. He returns spiritually in the final episode so that Alondra could come with him to heaven.
- Capt. Roberto Marcelo (Arnel Carreon) is Gabrielle's father, who appeared only in the series's webisode; he along with his wife died in the line of duty on his daughter's tenth birthday.
- 1st Lt. Margarita Marcelo (Therese Carlos) is Gabrielle's mother, she appeared only in "Minsan May Dalawang Bayani" in the series' online webisodes. She died in the line of duty with her husband and serves as an inspiration to her daughter following her footstep on becoming a female soldier.
- Mr. Matias (Dominic Ochoa) only showed once in the pilot episode and is Noberto's father, he congratulates his son of his recognition.
- Mrs. Matias (Yayo Aguila) Like Mr. Matias, she only showed throughout the series in the first episode, she plays Noberto's mother and appears after the graduation where she congratulates him of his achievements
- Mr. Villanueva (Allan Paule) is seen in two episodes and is shown to be as the head of the Villanueva family, along with his wife they sacrifice themselves and get shot by the army
- Mrs. Villanueva (Melissa Mendez) is seen in two episodes and escapes with her husband and kids. Like her husband, she gets shot and killed by the army, namely Edgardo Marcelo
- Gen. Armando Espiritu (Frank Gray Jr.) ranks in a much higher position than General Jaime and seems to be close to him and Edgardo but doesn't appear as often as them. He is in charge of the military missions and chooses the soldiers that will be in the field. He decides whether or not suspects will be freed based on their alibi and evidence
- Yaya Meena (Chiqui del Carmen) She has been the maid and nanny of the Del Tierro family ever since. She took care of Alexander while he was still growing up and is seen in the first and final season along with the webisodes. She plays a minor character but appears from time to time
- Pam (Regine Angeles) is seen in Season 2 where Javier was pretending to be his brother in a local bar, she is treated with drinks throughout the night and appears back another day and sees the real Alexander with Krista and tells him about the night in the bar. Javier comes back to the club and is caught by Alexander and is seen pretending to be him, Pam with her best friend, shocked, stands from their seats and calls Javier a phony
- Gem (Dionne Monsanto) She is Pam's best friend and stands by her side, she is seen with Pam at every scene. He last appearance was when she called Javier a phony
- Iñigo Rivera Suarez (Franco Daza) is a recurring character throughout the series and first appears at the bar with Pam and Gem along with his Sneaker boys group, he fights with Javier and it is then that he shares that his family owns the bars and many other properties around Manila, he later befriends Javier and uses him. Iñigo, his friends and Javier are later suspected that they are car-nappers, which is true—Iñigo owns a collection of stolen cars in his garage and plans to steal more. He teaches Javier how to carnap and is later sent to jail. After Javier overhears him with his friends calling him 'stupid' and realising that they're using him, the three Sneaker boys are later bailed out of prison and Javier suspects that they are responsible for attacking Lora's house and shooting his grandmother, Remedios. Because of this Javier physically assaults him and causes him to land a case against him, this is later negotiated with the return of pulling out the case of carnapping against them. His final appearance was when he and his friends are later sent to prison after Javier gives in a tip to the police keeping storage of illegal armoury.
- Rico (Dino Imperial) Part of the "Sneaker boys" and is a recurring character in Season 2, he befriends Javier and uses him and is the one who teaches Javier personally how to carnap. He leaves Javier after being caught carnapping but immediately calls Iñigo to rescue him. He pretends to be Iñigo after Tomas suspects that they have been carnapping. Eventually, he is imprisoned after being caught red handed carnapping. His final appearance was when he and his friends are later sent to prison after Javier gives in a tip to the police keeping storage of illegal armoury.
- Bunch (Michael Roy Jornales) A recurring character and part of the "Sneaker boys" in Season 2, compared to Iñigo and Rico, he plays a minor role and is later sent to jail after Javier agreed to help the police to catch them. All three are later freed from prison and bailed out. He plants a gun and drugs in Javier's car and frames him for taking them. Javier is then sent to jail for illegal armoury and possession of drugs. His final appearance was when he and his friends are later sent to prison after Javier gives in a tip to the police keeping storage of illegal armoury.
- Wedding singer (Gary Valenciano) Appeared as himself in the final episode, playing a wedding singer and singing the show's theme song

== Cast overview ==
Main

Supporting

Extended

Special participation

Guest

No appearances

Note: An actor's name appearing in italics denotes that he or she was used only in archive footage or voice-overs but was not credited.

Character	Season		
Character	Season 1 (2011)	Season 2 (2011)	Webisodes (2011)
=== Current or former military ===
Alexander "Xander" S. Del Tierro	Coco Martin	Coco Martin	
Gabrielle "Gabby" Marcelo	Andi Eigenmann	Andi Eigenmann	
Noberto "Berto" Matias	Martin del Rosario	Martin del Rosario	
Col. Joaquin Del Tierro	John Estrada	John Estrada	John Estrada
Gen. Jaime Sebastiano	Ronaldo Valdez	Ronaldo Valdez	
Gen. Edgardo Marcelo	Dante Rivero	Dante Rivero	Dante Rivero
Lt. Col. Santiago	John Apacible		
Young Jaime Sebastiano	Albert Martinez		Albert Martinez
Gen. Armando Espiritu	Frank Gray Jr.	Frank Gray Jr.	
Capt. Roberto Marcelo			Arnel Carreon
1st Lt. Margarita Marcelo			Therese Carlos
=== Current or former rebels ===
Javier Del Tierro	Coco Martin	Coco Martin	
Kaye "Krista" Villanueva-Del Tierro	Maja Salvador	Maja Salvador	
Tomas "Bernabe" Sta. Maria	Tonton Gutierrez	Tonton Gutierrez	
Lora "Rosa" Sebastiano-Del Tierro	Amy Austria-Ventura	Amy Austria-Ventura	Amy Austria-Ventura
Remedios "Elena" Sebastiano	Boots Anson-Roa	Boots Anson-Roa	
Diego Pamintuan	Ronnie Lazaro	Ronnie Lazaro	
Diosdado "Ibon" Pamintuan	Jojit Lorenzo	Jojit Lorenzo	
Tiago Villanueva	Lloyd Zaragoza	Lloyd Zaragoza	
Young Remedios Sebastiano	Agot Isidro		
Young Javier Del Tierro	Nash Aguas	Nash Aguas	Nash Aguas
Young Kaye "Krista" Villanueva	Khaycee Aboloc		
Mrs. Villanueva	Melissa Mendez		
Mr. Villanueva	Allan Paule		
Rebelde #1	Yutaka Yamakawa	Yutaka Yamakawa	
Rebelde #2	Xeno Alejandro		
Custodio	Perry Escaño		
Val	Fonz Deza		
Dindo	Mike Lloren		
Bautista	Marvin Yap	Marvin Yap	
=== Other citizens ===
Alondra Sebastiano-Del Tierro	Lorna Tolentino	Lorna Tolentino	Lorna Tolentino
Mimi	Candy Pangilinan	Candy Pangilinan	
Adel	Frances Makil-Ignacio	Frances Makil-Ignacio	
Young Gabrielle "Gabby" Marcelo	Mika Dela Cruz		Mika Dela Cruz
Young Alexander Del Tierro	Nash Aguas		Nash Aguas
Jaime Del Tierro Jr.	Bugoy Cariño	Bugoy Cariño	
Mr. Matias	Dominic Ochoa		
Mrs. Matias	Yayo Aguila		
Yaya Meena	Chiqui del Carmen	Chiqui del Carmen	Chiqui del Carmen
Teresa Valderosa	Angel Aquino		
Young Alondra Sebastiano	Kim Chiu		Kim Chiu
Young Lora Sebastiano	Erich Gonzales		Erich Gonzales
Young Joaquin Del Tierro	Xian Lim		Xian Lim
Young Mimi	Eda Nolan		
Pam		Regine Angeles	
Gem		Dionne Monsanto	
Iñigo Rivera Suarez		Franco Daza	
Rico		Dino Imperial	
Bunch		Michael Roy Jornales	
Hilda	Nina Ricci Alagao		
Doctor		Elaine Quemuel	
Wedding Singer		Gary Valenciano	
