= Flor de Liza =

- Directed by: Nick Lizaso
- Screenplay by: Jose N. Carreon
- Based on: Flordeluna by Marcos Navarro Sacol; Anna Liza by Rey Benedicto and Raynee Salgado
- Produced by: Jesse Ejercito
- Starring: Julie Vega; Janice de Belen
- Cinematography: Loreto Isleta
- Edited by: Manolo Abaya; Marc Tarnate
- Music by: George Canseco
- Production company: Seven Stars Productions
- Distributed by: Cine International Group (re-release)
- Release date: June 4, 1981
- Country: Philippines
- Language: Filipino

Flor de Liza is a 1981 Philippine drama film produced and released by Seven Stars Productions starring Julie Vega and Janice de Belen. It is a crossover between rival television series Flordeluna and Anna Liza, whose title roles were portrayed by De Belen and Vega, respectively.

== Synopsis ==
Flor de Liza is a story of two different girls who has the same dad. Flor who was born in a wealthy family and Liza who was born on an average society and who grew up without knowing and seeing her dad. Until Liza's dad decided to look for her and asked her to be with her but refused to because she doesn't want to leave her mother. Liza only decided to leave her mom when her father suddenly died in an accident. She was forced to move with Flor's family and live with them, but it turned out that Flor's mom doesn't want Liza to be friends with her daughter. But nobody could tell them what to do, and they became best friends. But Flor's mom will do everything just to keep Liza away from Flor...

== Cast ==
- Janice de Belen as Flor
- Julie Vega as Liza
- Zorayda Sanchez as Flor's mom
- Daria Ramirez as Sonia
- Baby Delgado as Rina
- Anita Linda as Feliza
- Eddie Rodriguez as Ramon
- Naty Mallares as Inday

== Production ==
This movie is the first collaboration of Julie Vega and Janice de Belen, two of the most famous childstars of their time who were stars in rival shows Anna Liza and Flordeluna respectively, which inspires the title of the movie.

== Remake ==
In 2015, ABS-CBN remade FlordeLiza after the rights of the said drama series was bought from its original director, Nick Lizaso. Ashley Sarmiento and Rhed Bustamante played the lead role.
