= Minsan Lang Kita Iibigin =

Philippine family military drama television series

- Title card
- Also known as: One Great Love
- Genre: Action; Drama; Romance; Family; Military fiction
- Written by: Reggie Amigo; Rondel P. Lindayag; Mark Bunda; Mariami Tanangco-Domingo
- Directed by: Ruel S. Bayani; Darnel Joy R. Villaflor; Avel E. Sunpongco
- Starring: Coco Martin; Maja Salvador; Andi Eigenmann; Martin del Rosario
- Opening theme: "Minsan Lang Kita Iibigin" by Gary Valenciano; "Minsan Lang Kita Iibigin" by Juris (season 2)
- Composer: Aaron Paul del Rosario
- Country of origin: Philippines
- Original language: Filipino
- No. of seasons: 2
- No. of episodes: 118 (list of episodes)

Production
- Producer: Rodel Luis Nacianceno
- Running time: 30-45 minutes
- Production companies: Dreamscape Entertainment Television; CCM Creatives

Original release
- Network: ABS-CBN
- Release: March 7 – August 19, 2011

Minsan Lang Kita Iibigin (International title: One Great Love / transl. I Will Only Love You Once) is a 2011 Philippine television drama family military series broadcast by ABS-CBN. Directed by Ruel S. Bayani, Darnel Joy R. Villaflor and Avel E. Sunpongco, it stars Coco Martin, Maja Salvador, Andi Eigenmann and Martin del Rosario. It aired on the network's Primetime Bida line up and worldwide on TFC from March 7 to August 19, 2011. It is the second Philippine television series to be shot in high definition format after Rounin.

== Plot ==
Alexander Del Tierro (Coco Martin) was born into a family affiliated with the army, his father, Col. Joaquin Del Tierro (John Estrada) is a respected military officer and his grandfather, Gen. Jaime Sebastiano (Ronaldo Valdez) is one of the feared generals in the Philippines but doesn't have a close relationship with his mother, Alondra (Lorna Tolentino) blaming him for the death of her youngest son, Jaime Del Tierro Jr. (Bugoy Cariño) which led Alexander to join the military otherwise after continuously refusing to do so. His best friend, Gabrielle (Andi Eigenmann) has been by his side in the most important times of his life and has developed feelings for him since they were about 10 years old. Gabrielle is raised by her grandfather, Gen. Edgardo Marcelo (Dante Rivero) after her parents died in the line of duty. Unfortunately Alexander doesn't feel the same way for her but one of their military friends, Norberto Matias (Martin del Rosario) does.

Alondra was brought up by Teresa Valderosa (Angel Aquino), Gen. Jaime's mistress. Her mother died after being hit by a car forcing Jaime to bring her into his family. It is there that she met Joaquin, her half-sister Lora's (Amy Austria-Ventura) boyfriend and developed feelings for him. Alondra has always envied and hated her sister, wanting everything that she owns, especially Joaquin and their father's affection. Lora's mother Remedios (Boots Anson-Roa) comes from a long line of rebels but was forced to leave the mountains when she fell in love with Jaime, she finds herself trapped in an unhappy marriage. After finding out about Jaime's mistress, she headed back to the mountains and waited for her daughter. In a later accident, Alondra tells a taxi driver to run over her sister. Lora is immediately sent to a private doctor. Alondra's best friend Mimi (Candy Pangilinan) and Mimi's cousin Tomas (Tonton Gutierrez) agrees that they would help her and it is there that they discovered about Lora's pregnancy. Jaime lies to Joaquin after hearing the news of Lora's disappearance and tells him that she has been found dead, thinking that she has decided to follow her mother to the mountains instead. Alondra leaves the country but goes back in time for Lora's labour. Lora gives birth to twin brothers but the doctors inform them that the other has died. Alondra takes the other baby, Alexander, and brings him to Joaquin, claims that he is theirs, forcing him to marry her.

Tomas' wife and child died before he met Lora, and he has developed feelings for her. After finding out that the twin who they thought died was breathing, he takes it as a message from God to start a new life. Lora wakes up from her coma after a year not knowing that she has given birth and finds out that Joaquin has been married with her sister. It is there that she decided to follow her mother, Remedios now named Elena, to the mountains with Tomas with his new name Bernabe and herself as Rosa taking Javier with them, the baby that Tomas allegedly found in a burning apartment.

Javier (Coco Martin) was raised up by his surrogate mother Rosa and his adoptive father Bernabe and Elena. Javier is aware that they're not his birth parents and longs to find his true family and live a normal life. His former girlfriend, Krista (Maja Salvador) is still in love with him and has two missions in life: to fulfill the romance between them and to avenge her parents death. Krista was raised up as an orphan by the rebels along with her brother Tiago (Lloyd Zaragoza). She witnessed her parents' death and remembers the soldier that killed them, Edgardo. When she was a kid, she was saved from the hands of the military by Alexander and fell in love with him and when she met Javier, she thought that it was him that helped her.

In an encounter between the soldiers and the rebels, Alexander and Javier met, and since then they tried to learn about each other's lives and family. The two brothers often switch lives and both fell in love with their female counterparts, Javier with Gabrielle and Alexander with Krista. The people surrounding them start to suspect that something is going on that neither of them knows.

Alondra follows Alexander and it is their that she finds out that Alexander has a twin brother. She develops a strong relationship with Javier that Alexander never felt, Alondra often sees Javier as Jaime Jr. Wanting to find out who raised Javier, she follows him on his way back to the mountains and is surprised to see Lora.

The soldiers capture Diego (Ronnie Lazaro), Tiago and Ibon (Jojit Lorenzo) in a later attack. Edgardo is forced to tell the truth to Joaquin concerning Lora and Remedios' alleged death and disappearance after facing the two in an encounter.

The truth between the twin brothers are revealed after Gabrielle, Alexander, Krista and Javier meet face to face. Rosa, Elena and Bernabe witness the capture of Javier and Krista. Elena surrenders for Javier but Rosa manages to escape. The four later decide to take on amnesty including Bernabe who was captured weeks after, reusing their birth names. Kaye realizes that Alexander was the one that saved her from the military when they were kids and immediately falls in love with him but Gabrielle refuses to feel the same way for Javier, despite having the same appearance, Gabrielle is convinced that Javier doesn't have the qualities that made her fall in love with Alexander. Mimi suspects that Alondra is responsible behind Lora's sudden disappearance. After months Lora comes back revealing the truth behind her absence, the fact that she was in prison after being framed by Tomas with drugs to keep her away from Joaquin. She comes back to Manila and visits the military camp in hope to see Joaquin but sees Alondra instead and is captured by the military. Lora decides to take on amnesty to be with her family especially her mother. Joaquin draws closure to her after years of not seeing each other and finds out the truth of why she never came back. She is set free along with Diego, Tiago and Ibon who decided to take on amnesty to take their revenge to the people that betrayed them namely Javier.

Javier experiences a hard time adjusting to a normal life and develops hatred and jealousy towards his brother, having Gabrielle's affection and a stable relationship with Krista. He gets involved in a carnapping business but later chose to betray his friends, Inigo (Franco Daza), Rico (Dino Imperial) and Bunch (Michael Roy Jornales) to avoid being sent to prison. Alexander meanwhile proposes to Kaye and Joaquin is more than happy for his son and arranged for the parental marriage proposal. It is there that Diego, Tiago and Ibon took their revenge. Unfortunately, Remedios gets shot and is rushed to the hospital which caused her to suffer subdural hematoma and eventually dies. Her death caused Lora and Jaime to re-build a strong relationship back to what it was before Alondra came into their lives, making her sister more jealous than before.

Javier is framed of drug possession and unlicensed armory and is sent to prison but escapes. He is seen roaming around a street near their house and Alexander is immediately ordered to run after him. Alexander surrounds his brother alone with no way out. Javier smacks Alexander making his brother fall out of conscious and asks Alondra for help who suggested locking up Alexander and impersonate Alexander. Javier locks his brother in a cage and breaks up with Krista to pursue his love for Gabrielle giving her suspicion that he isn't the same person. Gabrielle follows him on his visit to Alexander with Alondra and Mimi and is convinced that foul play has been involved. Mimi sees Gabrielle and, with confusion and desperation, hits her with an ax lying on the ground and falls into a ditch and loses consciousness. Gabrielle later wakes up and finally finds Alexander in the cage and dies painfully in front of her best friend and true love.

Alexander successfully escapes and captures Javier and ties him up. He is determined to find out who murdered his best friend and discovers that Alondra has been helping him. He fixes things up with Krista and tells her that Javier has been impersonating him explaining his recent actions. Meanwhile, Mimi runs away before the military find out about the murder. Alondra is frightened that she and Tomas would reveal the truth and so frames Tomas of killing Gabrielle by placing his watch besides Gabrielle's body bringing Tomas' life in danger. Lora finds out that Tomas has been lying to her all these years about her scar and that she has given birth and demands him for her sons but he refuses to answer. Alondra discovers that Alexander has escaped and hides Javier elsewhere and informs him about Gabrielle's death but refuses to believe so, Javier sneaks in to Gabrielle's funeral to prove it for himself. The military spotted Javier but they also saw Tomas who, after being beaten by Javier, managed to escape after a close call. The truth slowly unravels as Alexander reports to the headquarters of his suspicion that Alondra is helping Javier escape. Berto meanwhile finds out that Mimi is Tomas' cousin bringing to conclusion that Alondra might've taken Alexander from Lora, this is later proven after taking a DNA test, that Alexander and Javier are in fact Lora and Joaquin's sons. The only thing Lora wishes for is Javier, to fulfill her dream of having a complete family. Tomas is later found after threatening to kill Alondra. Alondra comes back home and finds out that they have discovered the truth and so Joaquin leaves her for good and files for annulment, meanwhile Lora visits Tomas and tells her that she would be leaving him considering that they're not legally married and would be erasing him from her mind. Not knowing that Lora is his real mother, Javier promises to protect Alondra bringing Alexander and Lora's life in danger with Alondra's plan to kill them for revenge. Tiago is put to prison and Diego and Ibon are wanted after Krista and Alexander overhears their plan of murdering Javier. Mimi returns with the help of Adele and sacrifices herself and admits that she is responsible for the death of Gabrielle.

Alondra kidnaps Lora and holds her in captive at the same building where they kept Alexander then, bringing her life in danger but later escapes with another reverse of events. Tomas breaks out of prison to prevent Alondra from harming her, Diego and Ibon later captures him and he tips them to go the same village where Alondra has kept Lora. In a rather puzzling encounter, Javier goes to the warehouse, without knowing that it is Alondra in uniform, Javier shoots her and is confused after seeing Alexander. Alondra treats her wound and finds a gun and plans to shoot her sister. Tomas meanwhile sacrifices himself for Lora as she is held at gunpoint by the rebels, Tomas gets shot and begs Lora for forgiveness before dying in her arms. The brothers eventually face off in a final showdown as Alexander tries to convince Javier to sacrifice himself, Lora and Joaquin gets hold of him and reveals the truth of their relation and finally decides to surrender and reconciles with his family including his best friend Krista, he is proven not guilty of the crime he was framed up for and wasn't sent to jail. Alondra meanwhile falls in the hands of the rebels who uses her to get hold of Javier and Lora. She is surprised to hear that they would help her despite all her wrongdoings and she asks for forgiveness from her family and lastly God as the military forces fail to stop the bombs planted around her. Jaime Jr. visits her spiritually and tells her to come home with him to heaven as the bomb explodes. The series ends a year after with Lora and Joaquin and Alexander and Krista celebrating a double wedding. Gen. Jaime is now retired and has passed on his seat to Edgardo as Vice Chief of Staff and Alexander and Krista are happy parents of twin brothers. The final scene shows Joaquin, Lora, Alexander, Krista, and Javier with the babies fulfilling the dream of a complete family.

== Cast and characters ==
=== Main cast ===
- Coco Martin as 2nd lieutenant. Alexander "Xander" Sebastiano del Tierro and Javier Sebastiano del Tierro
- Maja Salvador as Kaye "Krista" Villanueva-del Tierro
- Andi Eigenmann as Gabrielle "Gabby" Marcelo
- Martin del Rosario as Norberto "Berto" Matias

=== Supporting cast ===
- Lorna Tolentino as Alondra Sebastiano-del Tierro
- John Estrada as Col. Joaquin del Tierro
- Amy Austria as Lora Sebastiano-del Tierro / Rosa Sta. Maria
- Tonton Gutierrez as Tomas "Bernabe" Sta. Maria
- Boots Anson-Roa as Remedios Sebastiano / Elena
- Ronaldo Valdez as Gen. Jaime Sebastiano
- Dante Rivero as Gen. Edgardo P. Marcelo

=== Recurring cast ===
- Candy Pangilinan as Miranda "Mimi" Estrella
- Ronnie Lazaro as Julian "Diego" Pamintuan
- Jojit Lorenzo as Diosdado "Ibon" Pamintuan
- Lloyd Zaragoza as Fidel "Tiago" Villanueva
- John Apacible as lieutenant Col. Santiago
- Frances Makil-Ignacio as Adele

=== Extended cast ===
- Chiqui del Carmen as Yaya Meena
- Franco Daza as Iñigo Rivera Suarez
- Dino Imperial as Rico
- Michael Roy Jornales as Butch

=== Guest cast ===
- Arnel Carreon as Capt. Roberto Marcelo
- Therese Carlos as 1st Lt. Margarita Marcelo
- Dominic Ochoa as Mr. Matias
- Yayo Aguila as Mrs. Matias
- Allan Paule as Mr. Villanueva
- Melissa Mendez as Mrs. Villanueva
- Frank Gray Jr. as Gen. Armando Espiritu
- Regine Angeles as Pam
- Dionne Monsanto as Gem

=== Special participation ===
- Nash Aguas as young Alexander "Xander" S. del Tierro and Javier S. del Tierro
- Mika dela Cruz as young Gabrielle "Gabby" Marcelo
- Khaycee Aboloc as young Kaye "Krista" Villanueva
- Bugoy Cariño as Jaime del Tierro Jr.
- Kim Chiu as young Alondra Sebastiano
- Erich Gonzales as young Lora Sebastiano
- Xian Lim as young Joaquin del Tierro
- Albert Martinez as young Gen. Jaime Sebastiano
- Agot Isidro as young Remedios Sebastiano
- Angel Aquino as Teresa Valderosa
- Gary Valenciano as himself / Wedding singer (final episode)

== Production ==
Early production for Minsan Lang Kita Iibigin began in November 2010 and premiered on March 7, 2011. It previously had a working title of The General's Family, but later changed to Minsan Lang Kita Iibigin. It is the first television drama that featured three generations of artists followed by 2012 series, Walang Hanggan.

=== Postponement ===
The series was originally set to air on January 28, 2011. However, the show was postponed to give way for Mutya. The show was to replace Noah but since the show was child-oriented, Mutya seemed like a better fit and was chosen to replace it. When teasers for the series were shown, it was revealed that the first episode will be aired on February. However, it was once again postponed. Finally, the show was given an air date, on March 7.

=== Timeslot change ===
The series originally aired at the 8:20-9:00pm timeslot. However, in June 2011, the show was moved to a later timeslot that was previously occupied by Mara Clara. This was to give way to the premiere of the show Guns and Roses. Despite a later airing, the show still dominated its timeslot. However, compared to the average of 30 million viewers the show had on its original timeslot, the ratings dropped, garnering only an average of 25 million viewers after the show's time change. On its last three weeks of airing, the series regained its original audience.

== Reception ==
=== Ratings ===
The premiere on March 7, 2011, garnered a 38.7% audience share and earned first place, according to the March 7 data released by Kantar Media-TNS survey. The 3-part marathon special, shown during Holy Week, earned the fifth spot with 18.1% share in the ratings on April, 21 Thursday. The following day, the series earned sixth place with 16.4% ratings share. The last day of the marathon rose in the ratings earning second place with 17.8% based on the Kantar Media-TNS National Household Ratings. The series ended strongly, earning first place in the ratings with 39.1% audience share. According to Kantar Media-TNS data, Minsan Lang Kita Iibigin is the most watched program, along with 100 Days to Heaven, during the third quarter of the year.

=== Citation from the Armed Forces ===
The production team of the series and the actors playing the role of a militar were cited by the Armed Forces of the Philippines for promoting a positive image of the Philippine military. Minsan has been one of the two shows to be praised by the AFP after the 2009 series Tayong Dalawa. The three leading actors, Martin, Eigenmann and del Rosario went in training for the production of the series as they are in the field for the series more often than the seniors and were trained by actual soldiers so that they could portray their characters and movements perfectly. BGen. Jose Z. Mabanta Jr, AFP Spokesperson Commander, CRSAFP even praised the series and even recommended "that everyone watches this show", Ltc. Americo Fabrigar (GSC) PAF, Commander Information Development Group, CRSAFP also shared his opinion and said "they did very good. Maganda rin ang concept. [The concept is good.]"

=== Critical reception ===
The show received mainly positive reviews. Praising the actors for their perfect portrayal for their roles. Nestor Toree, an acclaimed critic of the Philippine Daily Inquirer said, "With its well-honoured talents. Minsan Lang Kita Iibigin is the new dramatic show to beat. It's great to see Lorna Tolentino and Amy Austria back in harness again." Isah Red of the Manila Standard said, "This has, in a way, made me watch local soaps again, with the interesting twist in the storyline" but commented on Martin's "slight problem with speech" but is "saved by correct muscular utilization in his face for the proper expression" Red also praised Tolentino and Austria and is convinced that they are "the serial's best actors" with "Estrada and Gutierrez struggling not to push their performances over the top" she also viewed Salvador and Eigenmann's performance and commented that sometimes Salvador "turns in an over-the-top performance" and understands Eigenmann's performance as to being "very young and has no insight in her turn as a military woman." Alfie Lorenzo of Abante Tonite said "With Coco Martin, damang-dama ng publiko kung ano ang role na ipinakita niya. Tumatagos sa laman at buto ng mga televiewers" [with Coco Martin, the audience can recognise the roles he's showing. It penetrates the flesh and bones of the televiewers] but also agrees to Martin having a slight lisp problem but is overthrown with his powerful acting. Lorenzo also praised Ronaldo Valdez's acting as a strict and straight-up general and grandfather. Another critic from Pilipino Star Ngayon, Veronica Samio praised Coco Martin on his acting, "sa kanyang kagalingan, nagagawa niyang distinct ang kanyang dalawang roles. [Because of his excellence in acting, he can make the two roles he's portraying distinct.] Minsan Lang Kita Iibigin will live long." Further reviewers such as Jun Nardo of Abante said, "Na-excite naman kami sa episodes na aming napanood dahil sa magandang kwento nito," and also praised Tolentino and Austria's performance. Melba Llanera PMPC Star Awards for TV (PMPC) President said, "Isang teleseryeng t'yak na aabangan, susuportahan at magiging bahagi nanaman ng pang araw-araw na buhay ng mga Pilipino. [A must-watch TV series that will be part of many Filipino's daily life.]"

Kantar Media National TV Ratings (8:20PM and 9:00PM PST)
Pilot Episode	Finale Episode	Peak	Average
38.7% March 7, 2011	39.1% August 19, 2011	39.1% August 19, 2011	29.7%

== Promotion ==
=== Mall tour ===
The cast of Minsan Lang Kita Iibigin, namely stars Coco Martin and Maja Salvador, lead the show's Pambansang Pasasalamat Tour (lit. National Thanksgiving Tour) around the nation. Martin del Rosario and Andi Eigenmann took part in some of the locations. The first official mall tour was on July 10, 2011, in Robinsons Metro East Manila followed by their second stop in CSI The City Mall, Dagupan on July 16. The crew stopped in Robinsons Place Pampanga before Metro East on June 7. Martin and Salvador later toured in Robinsons Place, Lipa on July 24 with special guests. They then visited the Pacific Mall Metro Mandaue Cebu on July 30. On the following day they stopped by in Robinsons Santa Rosa Market with their final tour being held in SM City North EDSA on August 14 featuring all the main and supporting cast in the SM Skydome.

=== Soundtrack ===
The Minsan Lang Kita Iibigin soundtrack was released by Star Records led by its title theme song sung by Gary Valenciano and originally performed by Ariel Rivera. The song Minsan Lang Kita Iibigin was also covered by Regine Velasquez. The digital album was officially on sale during the Pambansang Pasasalamat Tour for only ₱99 pesos.

No.	Title	Artist	Length
1.	"Minsan Lang Kita Iibigin"	Gary Valenciano	4:36
2.	"Kunin Mo Na Ang Lahat Sa Akin"	Angeline Quinto	4:31
3.	"Lapit"	Yeng Constantino	4:42
4.	"Nang Dahil Sa Pagibig"	Bugoy Drilon	4:20
5.	"Minsan Lang Kita Iibigin (acoustic)"	Juris Fernandez	4:32

=== DVD release ===
ABS-CBN has released Minsan Lang Kita Iibigin on DVD, that has been translated to the title, One Great Love. The DVD set contains all episodes from volume 1-10.

== Awards and nominations ==
Year	Award	Category	Work	Result
2011	ASAP Pop Viewer's Choice Awards	Pop Kapamilya TV Character	Alexander and Javier (Coco Martin)	Nominated
2011	ASAP Pop Viewer's Choice Awards	Pop Kapamilya Themesong	Kunin Mo Na Ang Lahat Sa Akin by Angeline Quinto	Won
2011	ASAP Pop Viewer's Choice Awards	Pop Kapamilya Themesong	Minsan Lang Kita Iibigin by Gary Valenciano and Juris	Nominated
2011	20th KBP Golden Dove Awards	Best TV Drama Program	Minsan Lang Kita Iibigin	Won
2011	20th KBP Golden Dove Awards	Best Actor	Coco Martin	Won
2011	20th KBP Golden Dove Awards	Best Actress	Lorna Tolentino	Won
2011	Golden Screen TV Awards	Outstanding Original Series	Minsan Lang Kita Iibigin	Nominated
2011	Golden Screen TV Awards	Outstanding Performance Of An Actor in a Drama Series	Coco Martin	Nominated
2011	Golden Screen TV Awards	Outstanding Performance Of An Actress in a Drama Series	Lorna Tolentino	Won
2011	25th Star Awards for TV	Best Primetime TV Series	Minsan Lang Kita Iibigin	Won
2011	25th Star Awards for TV	Best Drama Actor	Coco Martin	Won
2011	25th Star Awards for TV	Best Drama Actress	Amy Austria-Ventura	Nominated
2011	25th Star Awards for TV	Best Drama Actress	Lorna Tolentino	Nominated
2012	8th USTv Student's Choice Awards	Best Actor in a Daily Local Soap Opera	Coco Martin	Won
2012	10th Gawad Tanglaw Awards	Best Performance by an Actor in a Drama Series	Coco Martin	Won
2012	Northwest Samar State University Students' Choice Awards for Radio and Television	Best Drama Actor	Coco Martin	Won
2012	43rd GMMSF Box-Office Entertainment Awards	Prince of Philippine Television	Coco Martin	Won

== See also ==
- List of programs broadcast by ABS-CBN
