= Melissa Mendez =

Filipina actress (born 1964)

- Born: July 27, 1964 (age 61); Philippines
- Occupation: Actress
- Years active: 1969–present
- Political party: Aksyon Demokratiko
- Spouse: Erico Gobencion (m. 2012)
- Children: 3
- Relatives: Glenda Garcia (sister); Isabel Rivas (cousin); Dennis Roldan (cousin); Michele Gumabao (niece); Marco Gumabao (nephew)

Melissa Mendez (Tagalog pronunciation: [mɛnˈdɛs]; born July 27, 1964) is a Filipino film and TV actress.

Mendez was nominated for a Best Actress FAMAS Award for the film Kalakal (2008). Mendez produced an independent movie, Hilot (2009) with Empress Schuck. It was directed by Neal "Buboy" Tan under Emerge Productions. She was included in the cast of GMA 7's Indio (2013) starring, Bong Revilla.

== Personal life ==
Mendez is sister to actress, Glenda Garcia. She is the cousin of actor Dennis Roldan and actress Isabel Rivas. Melissa Mendez married Erico Gobencion on July 27, 2012.

She has three daughters: Denise (b. 1988), Cassie (b. 1992), and Alex (b. 1998).

In a commercial flight in March 2015, Melissa had a verbal and physical altercation with passengers: businessman Rey Pamaran and Mr. World Philippines 2013 Andrew Wolff. The plane turnaround mid-flight and offloaded her from the plane. She apologized after causing a media frenzy.

== Filmography ==
=== Film ===
| Year | Title | Role | Note(s) | Ref(s). |
|---|---|---|---|---|
| 1970 | Dimasalang | | | |
| 1970 | San Diego | | | |
| 1970 | Hipipotamus | | | |
| 1971 | Tisay | | | |
| 1983 | Kunin Mo ang Ulo ni Magtanggol | | | |
| 1985 | Grease Gun Brothers | Emily | | |
| 1987 | Amang Hustler | Amang's Fiancée | | |
| 1987 | Dugong Muslim | | | |
| 1988 | Rebelyon | | | |
| 1988 | Iyo ang Batas, Akin ang Katarungan | Cristy | | |
| 1988 | Pepeng Kuryente: Man with a Thousand Volts | Isabel | | |
| 1988 | Patrolman | | | |
| 1989 | Tadtarin ng Bala si Madelo | | | |
| 1989 | Abandonada | | | |
| 1990 | Bala at Rosaryo | Sally | | |
| 1990 | Hindi Kita Iiwanang Buhay: Kapitan Paile | Susie Altarejos | | |
| 1990 | Andrea, Paano Ba ang Maging Isang Ina? | Emma | | |
| 1992 | Sinungaling Mong Puso | Susan | | |
| 1992 | Shotgun Banjo | Carmen De Lara | | |
| 1993 | Capt. Rassul Alih: Hindi Sayo ang Mindanao | | | |
| 1995 | Sa Kamay ng Batas | | | |
| 1997 | Shake, Rattle & Roll VI | Marice's Mother | "Ang Tulay" segment | |
| 1998 | Haba-Baba-Doo! Puti-Puti-Poo! | | | |
| 1999 | Bayolente | Felisa | | |
| 1999 | Esperanza: The Movie | Elena | | |
| 2000 | Ex-Con | Wife of Cai | | |
| 2001 | Tabi Tabi Po! | Aling Bebang | "Demonyita" segment | |
| 2003 | Balat-Sibuyas | | | |
| 2003 | Silang Mga Rampadora | | | |
| 2003 | Pilya | | | |
| 2006 | Mga Batang Bangketa | | | |
| 2007 | The Promise | Andrea's mother | | |
| 2007 | One More Chance | Elvie | | |
| 2008 | Kalakal | | | |
| 2009 | Tulak | | | |
| 2009 | Hilot | | | |
| 2009 | Pasang Krus | | | |
| 2009 | Arusi: Sumpa ng Demonyo | | | |
| 2010 | Third World Happy | Beth | | |
| 2011 | So Much Pain So in Love | | | |
| 2012 | Unofficially Yours | Maria Galvez | | |
| 2015 | Halik sa Hangin | | | |
| 2015 | A Second Chance | Elvie | | |
| 2020 | The Missing | | | |
| 2023 | Ang Mga Kaibigan ni Mama Susan | Tiya Auring | Support role | |

=== Television ===
- Anna Luna (1989–94) – Emily Dominguez-Tecson/Pilar
- Bayani – Teodora Alonso
- Esperanza – Elena
- Pangako Sa 'Yo – Minerva Capito
- Sa Puso Ko Iingatan Ka – Nelia Domingo
- Maalaala Mo Kaya: "Sto. Nino De Cebu" – Daisy
- Maalaala Mo Kaya: "Family Picture" - Andrea's mother
- Maalaala Mo Kaya: "Cellphone" – Guest
- Maalaala Mo Kaya: "Bench" – Guest
- Lovers in Paris – Rowena Vizcarra
- Komiks Presents: Nasaan Ka Maruja? – Guest
- Precious Hearts Romances Presents: The Substitute Bride – Josie Lopez-Guttierez
- Maalaala Mo Kaya: Ketchup – Guest
- Rubi – Lilia
- Maalaala Mo Kaya: Silbato – Mrs. Javier
- Dahil sa Pag-Ibig – Elena Osorio
- Maalaala Mo Kaya: Balot – Guest
- Maalaala Mo Kaya: Saklay – Lina
- Minsan Lang Kita Iibigin – Guest
- Wansapanataym: Mac Ulit Ulit – Guest
- Walang Hanggan – Hilda Cruz
- Kailangan Ko'y Ikaw – Dina Manrique
- Annaliza – Mother of Stella
- FPJ's Ang Probinsyano – Mrs. Abella
- P. S. I Love You – Stella
- Anna Liza (1980–85) – Melissa
- GMA Telesine Specials: Kung Saan Sisikat ang Araw (1995) – Arlene
- Di Ba't Ikaw (1999) – Helen
- Now and Forever: Dangal (2006) – Guest
- Lupin (2007) – Edith Legarda
- Carlo J. Caparas' Kamandag (2007–08) – Elena
- E.S.P (2008) – Guest
- Luna Mystika (2008–09) – Bessie
- Claudine: "Fraternity" and "Laya" (2010) – Guest
- Time of My Life (2011) – Ingrid
- Spooky Nights: "Sapi" (2011) – Nena
- Broken Vow (2012) – Amor Santiago
- Indio (2013) – Alicia Decena
- My Destiny (2014) – Mrs. Arcilla
- Ang Lihim ni Annasandra (2014–15) – Daria Sanchez
- Karelasyon: "Kasambahay" (2015) – Ces
- Karelasyon: "Coma" (2015) – Zeny
- Destiny Rose (2015–16) – Yvonne Antonioni
- Dangwa (2015–16) – Esther
- Karelasyon: "Ate" (2016) – Grace
- Someone to Watch Over Me (2016–17) – Adora
- My Love from the Star (2017) - Doris Yuzon
- Contessa (2018) - Helen Ramirez vda. de Caballero
- The Lost Recipe (2021) - President Almonte
- Las Hermanas (2021) - Divine Sarmiento
- Abot-Kamay na Pangarap (2022) - Tim's Mother
- Hanggang Kailan, Anna Luna?: Ikalawang Aklat (1994–95) – Emily Dominguez-Tecson/Pilar
- Tierra Sangre (1996–99) – Aurora Sangre
