= Somewhere in My Past =

Single by Julie Vega

from the album First Love
- Released: 1985
- Recorded: 1985
- Genre: OPM
- Length: 3:24
- Label: Emerald Recording Company
- Songwriter(s): Mon del Rosario

Music video
- "Somewhere In My Past" on YouTube

"Somewhere in My Past" is a 1985 song composed by Mon del Rosario and recorded by Filipino singer-actress Julie Vega. The song is the debut single of Julie Vega and later served as the lead single of Vega's debut album "First Love" released under Emerald Recording Company.

== Awards and nominations ==
Song of the Year Nominee at the 1985 Awit Awards.

== Cover versions ==
- Mon del Rosario and a duet with Cookie Chua recorded the song for his 1999 album of the same name.
- Glydel Mercado recorded the song for her 2002 self-titled studio album.
- In 2004, singer Divo Bayer recorded the song for his debut album A Better Me.
- In 2012, singer Angeline Quinto performed the song on ASAP 2012.
- In 2025, singer Jojo Mendrez performed the song on DZMB, DWYS & DWRK FM Stations in the Philippines, that will release soon on Spotify.
