= Julie Vega =

Filipina actress and singer (1968–1985)

- Vega, c. '80s
- Born: Julie Pearl Apostol Postigo; 21 May 1968; Quezon City, Rizal, Philippines
- Died: 6 May 1985 (aged 16); Lung Center of the Philippines, Quezon City, Metro Manila, Philippines
- Cause of death: Pneumonia
- Resting place: Loyola Memorial Park; Marikina, Philippines
- Other names: Darling Postigo; Anna Liza; Tata
- Occupations: Actress; singer; model
- Years active: 1975–1985

Julie Pearl Apostol Postigo (21 May 1968 – 6 May 1985), better known by her stage name Julie Vega (Tagalog: [ˈdʒulɪ ˈbɛga]), was a Filipino actress, singer and commercial model. She remains very popular in her native Philippines, years after her death at the peak of her career at age 16. She won two FAMAS Awards for Best Child Actress during her brief showbiz career.

== Early life and family ==
Julie Vega was born as Julie Pearl Apostol Postigo on 21 May 1968 at the University of the East Ramon Magsaysay Memorial Medical Center in Quezon City, Philippines, to a practicing Roman Catholic family and was the youngest and only daughter of six children of dentists Julio Postigo (1931–1991) from Zamboanga del Sur and Perla Apostol (1936–2023) from Iligan. Her family nicknamed her Darling and Tata, which was given to her by her nanny Flor Argawanon and means "youngest child" in the Visayan language.

== Showbiz career ==
Vega was discovered by film and stage director Lamberto Avellana and actress Boots Anson-Roa in 1975 while performing at a Christmas party at the Quezon Institute where her mother then worked, thus starting her career the following year at the age of six as a commercial model in television for Purefoods and Band-Aid. She first used the screen name Darling Postigo and appeared in her first film entitled Ang Pag-ibig Ko’y Huwag Mong Sukatin (You Don't Measure My Love) as the young daughter of the characters played by Anson-Roa and Dante Rivero. It was not until she appeared in her first major lead and breakthrough role in the 1978 film Mga Mata ni Angelita (Angelita's Eyes) that she started using the screen name Julie Vega upon the recommendation of film producer and director Larry Santiago, who owned Larry Santiago Productions which produced the film. She had been chosen to play the title role despite placing only third among over 200 applicants for the role.

Although Vega later had to turn down the title role of Flor de Luna due to her schedule with acting and school, she would finally have her own soap opera when she was cast as the title character in GMA Network’s Anna Liza. Her portrayal of the sensitive, sad-sack and frequently oppressed title character drew the sympathy and affections of the Filipino viewing public and further solidified her star status. The success of Anna Liza made her the chief soap opera rival of Janice de Belen, a fellow child star who also enjoyed success with Flor de Luna, the title role Vega previously turned down, as the two dramas rivaled each other for the attention of the television-viewing public. Yet despite being rivals, the two were best friends in real life. De Belen once mentioned, "There could be no me if Julie accepted the role as Flor de Luna."

Aside from her work in Anna Liza, Vega also starred in several films and won two FAMAS acting awards overall. She won Best Child Actress for Mga Mata ni Angelita and Durugin si Totoy Bato and was nominated for Best Child Actress for Mga Basang Sisiw and Best Supporting Actress for Isang Bala Ka Lang! (You're Just a Bullet Away!).

When Vega became a teenager, she was signed to Regal Films by producer Lily Monteverde, who also owned the film company since its inception in 1962. She was then included among the so-called Regal "Cry Babies" along with then fellow teenaged actresses De Belen, Maricel Soriano, and Snooky Serna. She did a total of six films for Regal, including Where Love Has Gone, Mother Dear, To Mama with Love, and Daddy's Little Darlings, all of which became certified box office hits.

== Singing career ==
Aside from acting, Vega also became a successful singer in her own right. She initially refused to pursue a singing career of her own, but after repeated prodding from her older brother Joey, who noticed her beautiful singing voice, she finally consented to doing so. She took formal voice lessons under renowned songwriter Cecille Azarcon to further hone her singing voice. With the training she received, she was able to sing many of the theme songs of the movies she appeared in like Dear Mama, Where Love Has Gone, Don't Cry for Me Papa and Iiyak Ka Rin.

It was during one of her singing promotions for Where Love Has Gone that Vega was discovered by Bong Carrion, who then offered her to be a recording artist for the then newly formed Emerald Recording Company owned by Carreon and his then wife, the famous Filipina singer Imelda Papin. Her debut single Somewhere in My Past, composed by Mon Del Rosario, was a major hit which became a certified gold record in only its first few weeks of release and would prove to be her most enduring hit and the one song she would be most identified with. The single's success prompted Bong Carreon and Imelda Papin to launch Vega as a full-time solo artist by coming up with the latter's 1985 debut album First Love, which included Somewhere in My Past and produced her further hit songs like Someone Special, The Memory Will Remain, and the eponymous title track itself.

According to Vega, she particularly liked singing because it is through this medium that she is able to best express her inner thoughts and feelings. This became especially true after the loss of her brother Joey, to whom she was very close to. Joey was stabbed to death in a car by a hired killer who mistook him as a member of fraternity that he was supposed to kill, while inside the car with his friends in the night of March 24, 1983. His untimely death at the age of 22 proved to be devastating for the young Julie, who then repeatedly wished to join him in death.

== Education ==
In spite of her hectic showbiz schedule, Vega was still able to attend to her studies in school. She studied at the Our Lady of Sacred Heart School from grade school until first year high school before transferring to St. Joseph's College where she finished her high school education. The schools proved to be accessible to her since both are located not far from where her family used to live at 11th Avenue, Murphy, Cubao, Quezon City.

== Illness and death ==
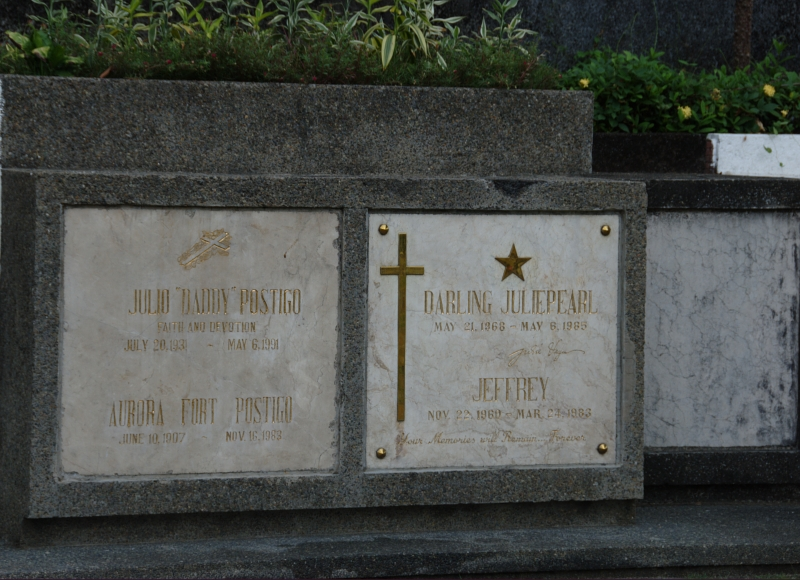
Julie Vega's tomb at the Loyola Memorial Park in Marikina.

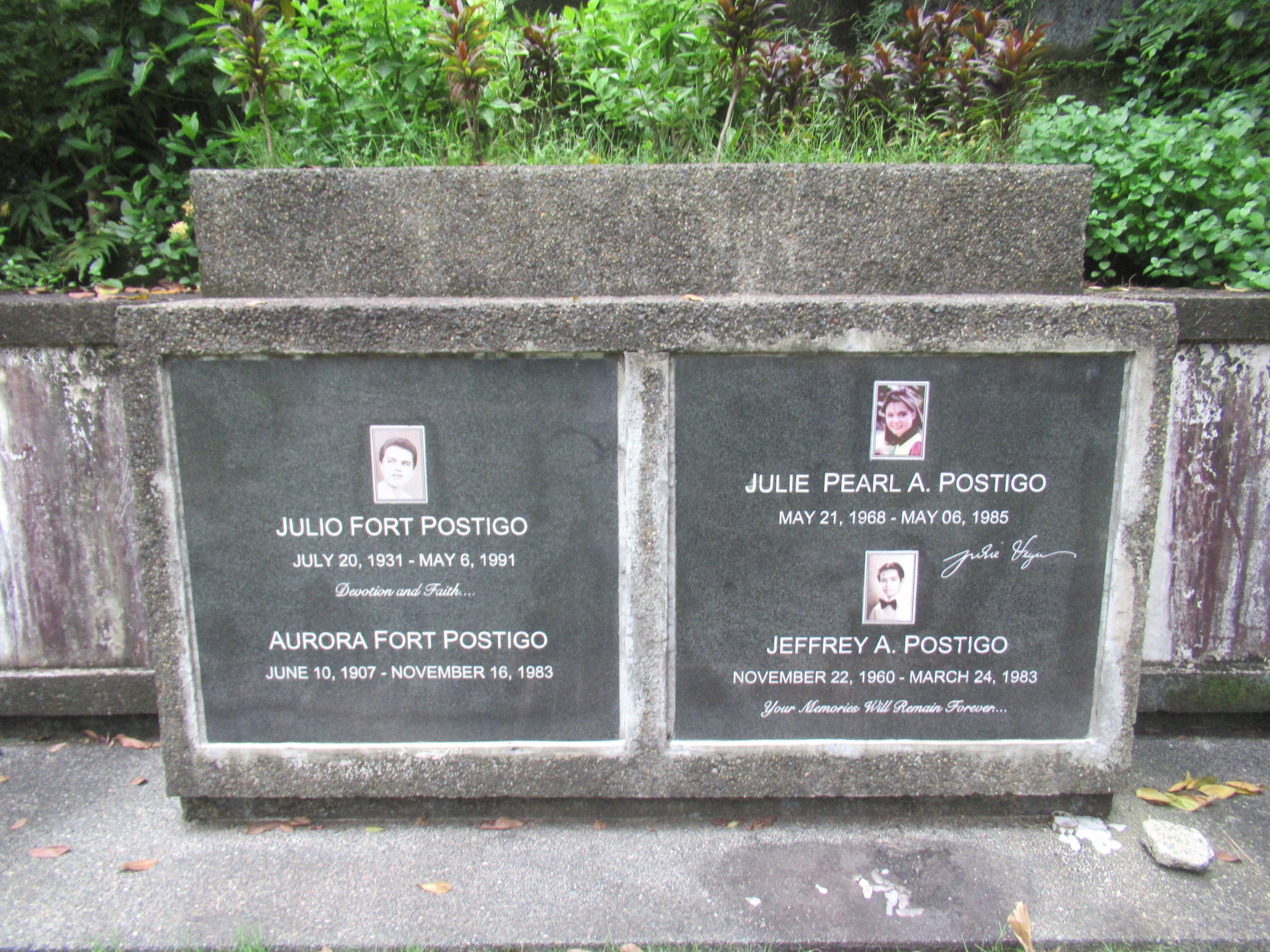
Family graves Loyola Memorial Park 2023

Not long after her high school graduation in 1985, Vega began complaining of extreme weakness and lack of sensation, particularly on her lower body. This prompted her parents to bring her to a private hospital. She was later diagnosed with a form of demyelinating disease, which was highly suspected to be either Guillain–Barré syndrome or multiple sclerosis. As Vega's condition became worse, her parents were forced to have her confined to the Quezon Institute as they could no longer afford the increasing amount of her hospital bills. Sometime after her confinement there, she contracted bronchopneumonia, making her condition even worse than before.

Vega was transferred to the Lung Center of the Philippines in Quezon City at about 5:00 p.m. PHT on Monday, May 6, 1985, where she died suddenly around 1½ hours later at the hospital's intensive care unit, just fifteen days shy of her seventeenth birthday. Her cause of death was officially listed as cardiac arrest secondary to bronchopneumonia. Vega's father Julio would himself die of lung cancer exactly six years later in the same hospital.

Her untimely death left Anna Liza with an incomplete storyline and the Filipino people in total shock. After lying in state at Mount Carmel Parish in Quezon City, her body was laid to rest right next to her brother and paternal grandmother at the Loyola Memorial Park in Marikina in a funeral attended by millions of grieving fans and colleagues from the Philippine entertainment industry.

At the time of her death, Vega left behind a large body of unfinished work aside from Anna Liza. She was supposed to promote her debut album First Love, do a second album for Emerald containing all Filipino language songs, perform with Imelda Papin in singing engagements both in the Philippines and abroad, start hosting two television shows (her own, Julie and Friends on Maharlika Broadcasting System, and as alternate host of Student Canteen on GMA), and star as one of the mainstays of the then upcoming teen-oriented talent show That's Entertainment on GMA. She planned to attend the University of the Philippines for her college education.

== Life story ==
Vega's life story was most notably shown on film through The Life Story of Julie Vega, which was shown shortly after her death. Nadia Montenegro portrayed the ill-fated movie and soap opera actress and singer, Jimmy Morato and Alicia Alonzo portrayed her parents, while her brother Steve and nanny Flor appeared as themselves. That's Entertainment mainstays Jestoni Alarcon, John Regala and Hero Bautista also portrayed her brothers in the film.

On television, she was portrayed by Angelica Panganiban and Jane Oineza on the October 2, 2003 episode of Maalaala Mo Kaya entitled Unan (Tagalog for Pillow). Vega's parents were portrayed by Michael de Mesa and Rio Locsin. The said episode was acclaimed by both critics and Julie Vega fans alike and is noted not only for Panganiban's resemblance to the real Julie Vega, but also for its use of actual footage of Vega's burial which featured not only fans but also celebrities like Fernando Poe, Jr., Chiquito, Nida Blanca, Herbert Bautista and best friend Janice De Belen in mourning her death. The video footage was lent by the Postigos themselves to the Maalaala Mo Kaya producers to be aired on the episode.

Vega was portrayed by Kira Balinger in a segment of the 2026 Halloween television special KMJS' Gabi ng Lagim XIV by GMA Network. The show dealt with alleged unexplained incidents during the shooting of Lovingly Yours, Helen in 1985 that became associated with Vega's death shortly after.

== Legacy and tributes ==
Due to Anna Liza's success, Vega was dubbed the "Original Soap Opera Princess". Director Ruel Bayani, the producer of ABS-CBN's remake of Anna Liza, commended Vega, calling her portrayal of the role "iconic" and that she set a high standard on being a "child star". Judy Ann Santos once stated on StarStudio's special issue that she is a fan of Vega, and when she learned about the latter's death, she first disappeared into her room and then into the bathroom. She turned the bathroom's doorknob quietly, pushed the door shut then stood in front of the sink. She then looked at herself in the mirror and cried.

Her rivalry with Janice De Belen ranks among the most famous female rivalries in Philippines' entertainment industry alongside Vilma Santos vs. Nora Aunor.

In December 2010, Vega was posthumously awarded her own star on the Eastwood City Walk of Fame. She also has another star at GMA Network's "Kapuso Walk of Fame" just outside GMA Network Center.

== Filmography ==
=== Film ===
Year	Title	Roles
1975	Ang Pag-ibig Ko'y Huwag Mong Sukatin	Herself
1975	Mortal	Mylene
1975	Mga Tinik ng Babae	Herself
1978	Mga Mata ni Angelita	Angelita
1979	Roberta	Roberta
1979	Durugin si Totoy Bato	Lucia
1980	Pompa	Pompa
1980	Kape't Gatas	Wewet
1980	Angelita ... Ako ang Iyong Ina	Angelita
1980	Anak ng Atsay	Lisa
1981	Mga Basang Sisiw	Herself
1981	Flor de Liza	Liza
1982	Ang Milagro sa Porta Vaga	Herself
1982	Where Love Has Gone	Liza Grande
1982	Mother Dear	Lagring
1982	Roman Rapido	Carmen
1983	To Mama with Love	Mylene
1983	Isang Bala Ka Lang!	Angela Rodriguez
1983	Iiyak Ka Rin	April
1983	Don't Cry for Me Papa	Gigi
1984	Dear Mama	Joy
1984	Daddy's Little Darlings	Chiqui
1984	Lovingly Yours, Helen: The Movie	Ida

=== Television ===
Year	Title	Roles
1979–1985	GMA Supershow	Co-host
1979–1985	Eat Bulaga!	Guest & Performer
1979–1985	Anna Liza	Anna Liza Santiago

== Discography ==
=== Album ===
- First Love – 1985, Emerald Recording Company

All songs were written by Mon Del Rosario except for "First Love", which was written by Alex Catedrilla.

1. "Someone Special"
2. "First Love"
3. "Somewhere in My Past"
4. "Only a Dream"
5. "So Impatient"
6. "The Memory Will Remain"

== Awards/recognitions and nominations ==
Year	Award	Category	Nominated work	Result
1979	FAMAS Awards	Best Child Actress	Mga Mata ni Angelita (1978)	Won
1980	FAMAS Awards	Best Child Actress	Durugin si Totoy Bato (1979)	Won
1980	1980 Metro Manila Film Festival	Best Child Performer	Kape't Gatas (1980)	Won
1982	FAMAS Awards	Best Child Actress	Mga Basang Sisiw (1981)	Nominated
1984	FAMAS Awards	Best Supporting Actress	Isang Bala Ka Lang! (1983)	Nominated
1985	Awit Awards	Song of the Year	Somewhere in My Past (1985)	Nominated
1985	Awit Awards	Emerging Female Singer of the Year	Herself (1985)	Won
2010	Eastwood City Walk of Fame	Posthumous Celebrity Inductee	Child actress, singer, television host (1975–1985)	Won
