= Lloyd Zaragoza =

Filipino actor

- Born: Lloyd Zaragoza Chong; November 2, 1981 (age 44); Metro Manila, Philippines
- Occupations: Actor, singer-songwriter
- Years active: 1998–2002; 2008–present
- Relatives: Jessa Zaragoza (sister); Jayda Avanzado (niece)

Lloyd Zaragoza (born November 2, 1981) is a Filipino actor and singer.

== Personal life ==
Zaragoza is a younger brother of singer and actress Jessa Zaragoza and the uncle of Jayda Avanzado.

== Filmography ==
=== Television ===
Year	Title	Role	Notes	Source
2001	Maalaala Mo Kaya	Bikoy	Episode: "Burda"	
2002	Kay Tagal Kang Hinintay	Luis		
2002	Wansapanataym	Joshua	Episode: "Mahiwagang Likido"	
2008	I Love Betty La Fea	Roman Salacedo		
2009	Precious Hearts Romances Presents: Somewhere in My Heart	Bogs		
2010	Rosalka	Gaspar		
2010	Wansapanataym	Ferdie	Episode: "Inday Sa Balitaw"	
2010	Yamaha Yey!	Himself / Host		
2011	Minsan Lang Kita Iibigin	Fidel "Tiago" Villanueva		
2012	Maalaala Mo Kaya	Marco	Episode: "Sumpak"	
2012	Maria La Del Barrio	Arnold		
2012	Maalaala Mo Kaya	Sonny	Episode: "Kape"	
2012	Wansapanataym	Delivery Guy	Episode: "Mai Palusot"	
2013	Maalaala Mo Kaya	Omar	Episode: "Altar"	
2013	Annaliza	Ira de Leon		
2013	Wansapanataym	Gardo	Episode: "Give Glove On Christmas Day"	
2014	Hawak-Kamay	Rambo		
2015	Flordeliza	Jason		
2015	FPJ's Ang Probinsyano	Dencio's Partner		
2016	Calle Siete	Skipper		
2017	Ipaglaban Mo!	Greta	Episode: "Beshies"	
2018	Ipaglaban Mo!	Cook	Episode: "Bayad"	
2019	Ipaglaban Mo!	Dandan	Episode: "Dignidad"	
2020	Almost Paradise	Jessa's Brother	Episode: "Lone Wolf"	
2022	Mars Ravelo's Darna	Arnold Bautista	Guest Cast	

=== Film ===
Year	Title	Role	Notes	Source
2008	Kasal			
2011	Tumbok			
