= Kaaway sa Sulod =

2019 Filipino drama film

- Directed by: Arnel Barbarona
- Produced by: Arnel Barbarona; Perry Dizon; Dionne Monsanto; Ethel Mendez; Arnel Mardoquio
- Starring: Dionne Monsanto; Perry Dizon; Dax Alejandro; Jeff Sabayle; Nor Heela Macusang
- Cinematography: Bryan Jimenez; Arnel Barbarona
- Edited by: Arbi Barbarona
- Music by: Teresa Barrozo
- Release date: 14 October 2019 (QCinema International Film Festival)
- Running time: 103 minutes
- Country: Philippines
- Language: Visayan

Kaaway sa Sulod (lit. 'The Enemy Within') is a 2019 psychological thriller drama. It is the second full-length film directed by Arnel Barbarona and written by Arnel Mardoquio.

== Synopsis ==
Two women on opposing sides of an armed conflict unexpectedly find that they are mirror images of each other and a shared past that would unite them. Lieutenant Raiza Umali was assigned to a team protecting a mysterious businessman in hiding. When they subdue his attackers, a New People's Army squad, she finds out one of its leaders, Ka Lai, resembles her.

Raiza learns they are protecting General Rapatan, an officer in hiding for the murder of activists. She questions her superiors, at the same time doubting her past. A DNA test shows Raiza and Lai are siblings. Her superior think of a mission to have Raiza switch places with her sister who is a guerrilla fighter to infiltrate the NPA. But Raiza makes a choice with fatal consequences.

== Cast ==
- Dionne Monsanto as Ka Lai / Lt. Raiza Umali
- Perry Dizon as Gen. Rapatan
- Dax Alejandro as Captain Nuñez
- Jeff Sabayle as Heneral Carlito Rapatan
- Nor Heela Macusang

== Release ==
Kaaway sa Sulod premiered out of competition at the 2019 QCinema International Film Festival Asian New Wave section. The film was also screened at the 2019 Salamindanaw Asian Film Festival and Mindanao Film Festival.

== Accolades ==
Accolades received by Kaaway sa Sulod
Award	Date of ceremony	Category	Recipient(s)	Result	Ref.
QCinema International Film Festival	October 13–22, 2019	Best Picture - Asian Next Wave Competition	Kaaway sa Sulod	Nominated	
QCinema International Film Festival	October 13–22, 2019	Pylon Award for Best Actress	Dionne Monsanto	Nominated	
