= Dionne Monsanto =

Filipino actress (born 1985)

Dionne Monsanto-Stalder
- Born: December 5, 1985 (age 40); Cebu City, Cebu, Philippines
- Occupation: Actress
- Years active: 2002–2021, 2023–present
- Agents: Star Magic (2007–2016) GMA Artist Center; Brightlight Productions
- Spouse: Ryan Stalder (m. 2021)
- Children: 1

Dionne Monsanto-Stalder (born December 5, 1985) is a Filipino actress.

== Career ==
Monsanto appeared on Pinoy Big Brother: Season 2 as a contestant in 2007. Monsanto entered on Day 12 of the series, and was evicted on Day 77. In the later part of 2007, Monsanto portrayed Salonna in Super Inggo 1.5: Ang Bagong Bangis, the series starring former child actor Makisig Morales. Monsanto's next television appearance was in 2008, when she starred in the TV series, Lobo. In 2009, she portrayed Grace Palacios in George and Cecil. and appeared as Jenny in a Philippine remake of Lovers in Paris. In 2015, Monsanto appeared in FlordeLiza, Pasión de amor and in the film Swap. In 2016, Monsanto appeared in the daytime TV series Tubig at Langis, her character Lucy Villadolid would later feature in memes.

On February 25, 2021, Monsanto announced her retirement so that she can emigrate to Switzerland, her husband's native country. On April 18, 2022, she gave birth to a baby girl with her husband Ryan Stalder.

== Filmography ==
=== Television ===
Year	Title	Role
2002	For Life Presents: Pen Pal	
2002	For Life Presents: Love Game	
2003–2004	For Life Presents: Bonding	
2005	For Life Presents: June	
2005	For Life Presents: Mga Bantan-on Karon	
2006	Krusada Kontra Krimen	
2007	Pinoy Big Brother: Season 2	Herself-Housemate
2007	Super Inggo 1.5: Ang Bagong Bangis	Salonna
2008	Lobo	Clarisse
2009–2021	ASAP	Herself / Performer
2009–2010	George and Cecil	Grace Palacios
2009	Precious Hearts Romances: Ang Lalaking Nagmahal Sa Akin	Maya
2009	Lovers in Paris	Jenny
2010	Precious Hearts Romances: The Substitute Bride	Agnes
2010	Precious Hearts Romances: Impostor	Querida
2010–2011	Precious Hearts Romances: Alyna	Arianna
2011	Minsan Lang Kita Iibigin	Gemma
2011–2012	Maria La Del Barrio	Anna
2011–2012	Nasaan Ka Elisa?	Maggie
2012	Precious Hearts Romances: Hiyas	Gemma
2012–2013	Precious Hearts Romances: Paraiso	Julianna Galang
2013	Annaliza	Vicky Gomez
2013–2014	Jim Fernandez's Galema, Anak Ni Zuma	Jessica
2014	The Legal Wife	Rhea
2014	Pure Love	Chelly
2015	FlordeLiza	Lynette Nacianceno-Perez
2015	Pasión De Amor	KC
2016	Tubig at Langis	Lucy Villadolid / Angel Villadolid
2016	You're My Home	Mildred De Villa
2017	Karelasyon: Wanted: Perfect Woman	Micks
2017	Ikaw Lang ang Iibigin	Vanessa
2017	Wagas: Mata	Rebecca
2017	Wagas: Padyak Para sa Pag-ibig	Young Emilia
2018	Tadhana: Luho	Lorena
2018	Spirits Reawaken	Miss V.
2019	The General's Daughter	Vera Sangre
2020	A Soldier's Heart	Atty. Odessa Mariano
2020–2021	I Got You	Hailey
2023	Unbreak My Heart	Queenie
2023–present	ASAP	Herself / Host / Performer

=== Film ===
Year	Title	Role	Notes	Source
2008	When Love Begins	Nena		
2008	Torotot (Destierro)	Precious		
2010	Sa 'yo Lamang	Coby's GF		
2012	The Healing	News reporter		
2012	Suddenly It's Magic	Ditas		
2013	Palad Ta ang Nagbuot			
2013	An Opening to Closure	Jessica Clemente		
2013	Iskalawags	Ma'am Lina		
2015	Swap	Insiang		
2016	Always Be My Maybe			
2016	Ned's Project			
2017	Woke Up Like This	Kirsten		
2018	Exes Baggage	Reyna		
2018	Glorious	Niko's Ex		
2019	Kaaway sa Sulod	Ka Lai / Lt. Raiza Umali		
2019	Mina-Anud	Gina		
