= Annaliza =

2013–14 Philippine television drama series

- Season 1 title card in 2013
- Genre: Family drama
- Created by: ABS-CBN Studios; Rey Benedicto; Raynee Salgado
- Based on: Anna Liza (radio drama)
- Developed by: ABS-CBN Studios; Ruel S. Bayani
- Written by: Carmela Abayger; Margarette Labrador; Pamela Miras
- Directed by: Theodore C. Boborol; Cathy O. Camarillo
- Creative director: Johnny Delos Reyes
- Starring: Andrea Brillantes; Zanjoe Marudo; Denise Laurel; Kaye Abad; Patrick Garcia; Carlo Aquino; Kyline Alcantara
- Opening theme: "Annaliza" by Liezel Garcia / Roel Manlangit
- Country of origin: Philippines
- Original language: Filipino
- No. of seasons: 3
- No. of episodes: 215

Production
- Executive producers: Carlo Katigbak; Cory Vidanes; Laurenti Dyogi; Ruel Bayani
- Producers: Katrina Juban; Rizza Gonzales-Ebriega
- Cinematography: Gary Gardoce
- Running time: 30-45 minutes
- Production company: RSB Production Unit

Original release
- Network: ABS-CBN
- Release: May 27, 2013 – March 21, 2014

Related
- Anna Liza (GMA Radio-Television Arts, 1980-1985)

Annaliza is a Philippine television drama series broadcast by ABS-CBN. The series is a remake of a 1980 Philippine television drama series of the same title aired on GMA Radio-Television Arts which originally starred Julie Vega. Directed by Theodore C. Boborol and Cathy O. Camarillo, it stars Andrea Brillantes, Zanjoe Marudo, Denise Laurel, Kaye Abad, Patrick Garcia, Carlo Aquino and Kyline Alcantara. It aired on the network's Primetime Bida line up and worldwide on TFC from May 27, 2013, to March 21, 2014, replacing Little Champ and was replaced by Mirabella.

== Summary ==
Annaliza Querubin is a bright, hopeful girl who loves to cook, living with her single father, Guido, a kind fisherman who loves her as his own daughter. Unbeknownst to the child, it is later revealed that she is the long-lost daughter of chef and restaurateur Lazaro Benedicto and his wife, Isabel. She was kidnapped at birth by Makoy Diaz, who was following the orders of Lazaro's ex-lover, Stella Celerez, who vowed revenge against the Benedicto family after Lazaro discovered her prostitution job to pay for her younger sister's medical bills and rejected their lovechild, Arlene, who is Annaliza's older half-sister. It's only a matter of time before Annaliza discovers her past and finds her place after the tragic events involving her family, friends, and loved ones.

== Cast and characters ==
=== Main cast ===
- Andrea Brillantes as Annaliza Querubin / Julie G. Benedicto - The main protagonist of the series. She is the long lost daughter of Isabel and Lazaro, and Arlene's younger half-sister, stolen as a baby by Lazaro's vengeful ex-girlfriend Stella and her lover Makoy. Annaliza however ended up under the care of Guido, a hardworking and responsible young fisherman. Although deprived of a mother's love, Annaliza grew up into a pious and good-hearted young girl with a love for cooking under Guido's guidance and influence, who treated her like his real daughter. Despite this Annaliza, still longed to have a complete family. In an unexpected turn out of events, Guido meets Stella, and out of Annaliza's urgings, decided to marry her to give his daughter a mother. Unfortunately, just as Stella is beginning to warm up to her stepdaughter, Annaliza's real identity was revealed to her. Together with her eldest daughter Arlene, they made it their aim to usurp Annaliza of her identity and inheritance, and to make her life a miserable one. However, Annaliza doesn't back down, and with her faith in God, she'll do anything to bring her family together again. In the end, she gets her happy ending when Guido and Isabel marry and the family is complete.
- Zanjoe Marudo as Gideon "Guido" P. Querubin - The handsome and good-hearted young fisherman with a distinguished talent in cooking who became Annaliza's adoptive father, and eventually her full-pledged stepfather. Deprived of paternal care at childhood, Guido lived a carefree life with people around him whom he treats as family. He was reluctant to take the baby Annaliza under his wing at first, knowing Makoy's dark activities, but after a short time caring for the baby he felt a sense of responsibility and love that he longed to have, and decided to keep the baby as his own. Raising Annaliza with all the love and care he can give, Guido worked odd jobs to support his only family and even agreed to marry Stella to give her a mother. When he leaves to work abroad to support his growing family, he unaware of the abuse Annaliza received from her stepmother and stepsister, and much worse, got incarcerated for a crime he did not commit. With the help of Lazaro and Isabel, Guido was able to reunite with Annaliza - only to be cut short when Annaliza was taken back by her real family. Sadly also his marriage with Stella started to fall apart due to the latter getting back together with Lazaro. After Lazaro dies, he resumes the role of being Annaliza and her siblings’ father figure and protector, while evolving from a simple cook to a promising restaurateur. He also developed an attachment to Isabel, which he tried to deny due to his respect towards his adoptive daughter's late father. In the series finale, Guido reunites with Annaliza and marries her mother Isabel, starting a real family with his adoptive daughter.
- Denise Laurel as Isabel Garcia-Benedicto / Isabel Garcia-Querubin - Annaliza's courageous and benevolent birth mother and the unhappy young wife of Lazaro and Arlene's step mom . She had unrequited feelings for him though all he can give her is close friendship. However, due to Amparo's hatred for Stella, Isabel agreed to marry her best friend to save him from going downhill, which led to a cold marriage since their daughter's disappearance. Isabel also knew that Lazaro was still in love with his ex-girlfriend, Stella. Despite this Isabel remained a dutiful and loving wife to her husband, but after Annaliza's return and Stella's sudden infiltration to the Benedicto family, she decided to fight back for her rights as Lazaro's wife. Unfortunately, Lazaro ended their marriage for good and even tried to separate Annaliza from her mother. When the truth came out about Stella's connection to Annaliza's disappearance Isabel and Lazaro tried to rebuild their broken family, only to be cut short by Lazaro's untimely, tragic death. With Lazaro dead and Stella in hiding, the grieving Isabel took the responsibility of looking after Annaliza and Stella's two daughters Arlene and Cathy, as well as her mother-in-law who suffered from clinical depression, revealing her selfless and compassionate nature. After a year, Isabel and the Benedicto family began to slowly move on from Lazaro's tragic demise. At the same time, the young widow developed a growing attachment to Annaliza's adoptive father, Guido, who became her protector and best friend. In the series finale she finally opened her heart for another man, starting a new beginning with Guido and Annaliza.
- Patrick Garcia as Lazaro "Laz" Benedicto - Arlene and Annaliza's wealthy and misled father, Isabel's first husband, Stella's ex-boyfriend, Makoy's rival, and Amparo's son. Although living in luxury and owning a 5-star restaurant, Lazaro lived an unhappy life with his mother disapproving his relationship with Stella, and then later in an arranged marriage with Isabel. Although he soon learned to love Isabel, Lazaro admitted that his first and greatest love would be no other than Stella. Lazaro is threatened by Guido due to his closeness to Annaliza who still sees the latter as a significant father figure. After Annaliza's return, Lazaro and Isabel's marriage fell apart and he reconnects with Stella again, bringing Annaliza more misery than good. He also tried to separate Annaliza from Isabel, and began to mistreat her, much to the delight of Stella and Arlene. However, midway in the series it was revealed to be just his stratagem to ensnare Stella and make her admit her crimes. His efforts in bringing justice for his daughter and family ended in a tragedy, however. To protect Annaliza, Lazaro was able to shield with his body the bullet that was meant for his daughter. In a very sad goodbye, the dying Lazaro confessed to the grieving Isabel that being with her is the greatest 10 years of his life, before falling down lifeless on the way to the hospital. The doctors were not able to bring him back, leaving Isabel a widow and Arlene and Annaliza as orphans.
- Kaye Abad as Stella Celerez - The mother of Arlene and Cathy, and Annaliza's scheming and heartless stepmother, Lazaro's first love, and Isabel's rival for her old flame. Lazaro left her after a misunderstanding together with his unborn first daughter, fueling her anger. To exact revenge, Stella has Makoy kidnap Lazaro's daughter with his present wife Isabel and left it to be dispatched by Makoy, which ultimately backfired as the baby ended up with who will be her future husband. When she first met Annaliza she was cordial and even motherly to her, but after her marriage with Guido (which is later revealed to be unauthenticated ans not legal) and the truth came out, she began to treat Annaliza like a servant and even manipulated Annaliza's older half-sister Arlene to hate her. When Arlene's identity as a Benedicto was confirmed, it paved her way back to the family's wealthy household, becoming her father's second lover and Annaliza's stepmother again. Just as she was about to succeed with her plans, Stella's real motives were revealed, leading to her downfall. After Lazaro dies she becomes a fugitive, and made a resolution to kill everyone who she thought wronged her, specifically Annaliza. In the end, Stella received her just deserts when half of her face was burned and her youngest daughter is dead. Before being sent to prison again, she asked for forgiveness from Annaliza, remorseful of all the bad things she had done all her life.
- Carlo Aquino as Marcus "Makoy" Diaz - Stella's right-hand man and lover, and the real father of her second daughter, Cathy. Makoy was initially a good person - out of love for Stella his good persona was exploited. Extremely submissive and obedient to Stella he would do just about everything she commands, from trying to kill Annaliza to trying to poison Annaliza's mother Isabel. He was the one who killed Lazaro, in his attempt to end Annaliza's life. However Makoy's deeds were also equally rewarded when a mistake in Stella's wicked plans caused the death of his own daughter, Cathy. This drove Makoy into a fit of insanity, ultimately leading him to a resolution to dispatch Annaliza and all the people she loved. In the end, he died after Stella shot him. Before he died, he apologizes to Guido and asks for forgiveness.
- Kyline Alcantara as Arlene Mae C. Benedicto - Annaliza & Cathy's envious and insecure older half-sister and her rival for PJ's affection. The love child of Stella and Lazaro, Arlene had a tough childhood due to her mother's bad upbringing and vainglorious attitude, which she inherited. When Stella married Guido she was the first to openly show disapproval and spite towards her new stepfather, although it is clear Guido accepts them as family. She is greatly envious of Annaliza due to her positive outlook in life, and is manipulated to hate and treat her like a slave. Ambitious and proud she dreams of a much better life despite Guido's efforts, which she ultimately attains once she reclaims her status as the first born Benedicto. Her efforts turned into vain when Annaliza was revealed to be the only legitimate Benedicto, and her jealousy and wickedness instantly escalated to a dangerous and fatal one, helping her mother putting Annaliza's life on edge. She also tried to win their grandmother's affection, ultimately deposing Annaliza's status in the Benedicto household. Once Lazaro and Stella got back together, she reverted into making her younger half-sister's life a living hell with her grandmother and mother's help, but when Lazaro died due to Stella's wickedness Arlene had a sudden change of heart and began to slowly accept Isabel, Guido and Annaliza as family. Her hatred was then reverted to her own mother, which intensified when she learned that the reason of Annaliza's separation from her birth parents was her own mother's wicked designs. In the series finale, she found the heart to forgive her mother from all her wrongdoings and chose to stay with their grandmother after Isabel and Annaliza left for the US. She is later seen standing as an usherette during Isabel and Guido's wedding and is in very good terms with everyone.

=== Supporting cast ===
- Nathaniel Britt as Peter John "PJ" Villaflor - Annaliza's best friend and later on crush. He had been with Annaliza throughout all her tribulations in life, and is willing to do anything to help her. He and Annaliza had a small misunderstanding out of Arlene's jealousy towards their friendship, but the two of them made amends soon afterwards. It was ambiguously revealed midway that he and Annaliza share the same romantic feelings, but being too young and out of Annaliza's fear for her father's disapproval, they decided to put their romantic interests on hold.
- Jillian Aguila as Anne Catherine "Cathy” C. Diaz - Arlene & Annaliza's ill-fated half-sister and stepsister. Merely an innocent toddler, Cathy is the joy of the Querubin family before Stella lost her way, and is much loved by Guido and her two sisters. Her only desire was to see her family happy and meet her real father, which turned out to be Makoy. After her family fell apart Cathy lived under the Benedicto's care but one day unintentionally drank the poison laced drink that was supposed to be for Annaliza. Before she died Makoy was able to visit her, and in her dying breath she asked her father to make for her a thousand paper crane origami, to which she believes would make all her wishes come true. Her death is greatly grieved by those who loved her, also driving her real father into a state of insanity.
- Dale Baldillo as Glenn Benedicto / Glenn Gomez - He was the adopted son of Isabel and Lazaro, due to Isabel's grief of losing her daughter. Initially, Glenn and Annaliza became drawn to each other but became distant when PJ entered the picture. Glenn's real mother soon came back to claim him, and he soon disappears just before Annaliza's real identity was discovered. Later during Lazaro's funeral, Glenn reappears again to pay his respect and express his grief over the loss of the only father he had known.
- Jean Saburit as Amparo Benedicto - Annaliza and Arlene's conniving grandmother, Lazaro's overbearing mother and Isabel's difficult mother-in-law. She is the cause of Stella's bitterness and Isabel's sorrow, to Annaliza's misery and Arlene's misguidance. She initially hates Stella due to her coming from an impoverished background, and placed her son into an unwanted marriage with his best friend, but after years with her daughter-in-law, Amparo thought she made a wrong choice for her son's wife. After Arlene's return to the Benedictos, she began to connive with Stella to destroy Isabel and Lazaro's already failing marriage for no apparent reason, and she seemed to have started to hate Annaliza for no apparent reason either. Her money and influence finally overpowered Isabel's efforts in saving her family, but her plans backfired as it was her own son who was taken away from her. This caused her to fall into a deep state of depression, blaming no other than Arlene for all her the bad things that happened to their life. With Annaliza and Isabel's help Amparo recovered and became a changed woman, befriending Guido and his friends and even accepting Arlene's sister in the family. To protect the remaining family she had from Stella and Makoy, Amparo is willing to kill anyone who does them harm in any way. In the series finale, she acts as Isabel' maternal figure and mentor, and even urges her to remarry as she is still a young woman (she cites she would be happy if she ends with Guido). She is later seen together with a new partner standing as parents for Isabel during her wedding with Guido, showing her support and love for her former daughter-in-law.
- Ces Quesada as Carmelita "Milet" Ramos
- Boboy Garrovillo as Agustin "Gusting" Ramos
- Pinky Amador as Tessie Garcia
- Johnny Revilla as Conrad Garcia
- Bugoy Cariño as Patrick "Pating / Ting" Mendoza
- Desiree del Valle as Shirley Cruz-Andres
- Kyle Kevin Ang as Lester
- John Vincent Servilla as Ricky Ramos
- Reign Tolentino as Maria Angelita "Angel" Reyes
- Bea Basa as Emily "Aimee" Basa
- Karl Hendric Angala as Mico
- Alexzhandra Quiambao as Cheska Sandiego
- Sajj Geronimo as Yuri
- Mianne Fajardo as Heather
- Jae Cochon as Julia Sandiego
- Ellen Adarna as Maria Diana "Ana" Ramirez
- Sue Ramirez as Luisa "Louie" Celerez
- Khalil Ramos as Jeric Garcia
- Kiko Estrada as Bart Dimaguiba
- Shy Carlos as Bianca
- Sunshine Garcia as Pam
- Cara Eriguel as Marga,
- Peewee O'Hara as Yaya Mona
- Alchris Galura as Tom Dimaguiba
- Karen Dematera as Elsa Cruz-Dimaguiba
- Alex Castro as Cedrick Francisco
- Kyra Custodio as Saicy
- Alida Moberg as Martha
- Beatriz Saw as Ms. Fontanilla
- Ana Abad Santos as Principal Paulita Javier
- Dionne Monsanto as Vicky Gomez
- Lemuel Pelayo as Ram
- Lloyd Zaragoza as Ira de Leon
- JV Kapunan as Jacob
- Yutaka Yamakawa as Robert
- Shaina Magdayao as Elizabeth "Beth" Aquino

=== Special participation ===
- Isabel Oli as Chef. Bernadette Cruz: Annaliza's teacher in cullinary school. She attempted to kill Annaliza by poisoning her, but it backfired when Cathy was killed instead.

== Award ==
- 2013 PMPC Star Awards for Television's "Best Child Performer" - Andrea Brillantes (Won)

== Development ==
After the success of Maria Flordeluna, Annaliza was supposed to be remade in 2008, to be led by Ella Cruz as the young Annaliza, and Maja Salvador as the teenage Annaliza, but ABS-CBN decided to shelve the show.

In March 2013, ABS-CBN announced that the classic soap will return on TV after almost 5 years and will be one of Kapamilya Network's second quarter offerings for 2013.

In September 2013, Brillantes announced on ASAP 18 that the series will be extended until 2014 because of its big success.

== Ratings ==
According to data from Kantar Media Philippines, Annaliza successfully conquered the early primetime viewing habit of TV viewers as it reigned in its timeslot with a pilot national rating of 16.7% beating its rival program in GMA Network, Home Sweet Home which only got 8.8%. It soared high on its 2nd day garnering a 19.3% national rating versus the 10.2% rating of its rival.

Annaliza hit an all-time high national TV rating of 27.6% on September 25, 2013, beating its rival program Prinsesa ng Buhay Ko with only 13.5%. It also dominated its time slot on September 20, 2013, with 27% versus Binoy Henyo, which concluded its run with a national TV rating of 14.4%.

KANTAR MEDIA NATIONAL TV RATINGS (5:45PM PST)
PILOT EPISODE	FINALE EPISODE	PEAK	AVERAGE	SOURCE
16.7%	27.7%	27.8%	24.3%	

== Critics ==
The director of the original Anna Liza, Gil Soriano, tagged Andrea Brillantes as the next Judy Ann Santos based on her portrayal as Annaliza. He stated: "She is really good. I think she will stay long in showbiz. She may be the next Judy Ann Santos", "I really like it. When I saw the trailer, I told myself that this show would surely rate."

== See also ==
- List of programs broadcast by ABS-CBN
- List of ABS-CBN Studios original drama series
- Anna Liza
- Julie Vega
