= FlordeLiza =

2015 Philippine television drama series

- Title card
- Genre: Family drama Melodrama; Crime
- Created by: Keiko Aquino; Wenn V. Deramas
- Based on: "Flor de Liza" (1981) by Nick Lizaso
- Written by: Keiko Aquino; Honey Hidalgo; Kay Brondial
- Directed by: Wenn V. Deramas; Claudio "Tots" D. Sanchez-Mariscal IV; Alan Chanliongco
- Starring: Ashley Sarmiento; Rhed Bustamante; Jolina Magdangal; Marvin Agustin; Desiree del Valle; Carlo Aquino; Valerie Concepcion
- Opening theme: "Kapag Ako ay Nagmahal" by Morissette / Jolina Magdangal "Flordeliza" by Camille Santos
- Composer: Larry Hermoso
- Country of origin: Philippines
- Original language: Filipino
- No. of episodes: 158

Production
- Executive producers: Carlo Katigbak; Cory Vidanes; Laurenti Dyogi; Ginny Monteagudo-Ocampo
- Producers: Jovelyn Aberion; Cynthia De Jesus-Jordan
- Production location: Metro Manila
- Editor: Roman Rodriguez III
- Running time: 27–30 minutes
- Production companies: Seven-Star Productions; GMO Entertainment Unit

Original release
- Network: ABS-CBN
- Release: January 19 – August 28, 2015

FlordeLiza is a 2015 Philippine television drama series broadcast by ABS-CBN. Based on a 1981 Philippine film of the same title, it was directed by Wenn V. Deramas, Claudio "Tots" D. Sanchez-Mariscal IV and Alan Chanliongco, it stars Ashley Sarmiento, Rhed Bustamante, Jolina Magdangal, Marvin Agustin, Desiree del Valle, Carlo Aquino and Valerie Concepcion. It aired on the network's Kapamilya Gold line up and worldwide on TFC from January 19 to August 28, 2015.

== Synopsis ==
Follow the story of Crisanto, a soldier who went to other places to fight in a war about two groups with different beliefs. In the middle of his fight, he met Florida. Crisanto, who has a family to return to, didn't resist the temptation and had a child with Florida named Flor, a sweet little girl who loves them dearly. One day, the enemy's side surprisingly attacked Crisanto. To protect Flor from the war, he forced her to hide in their house. After the war, because of the wounds and bruises that Crisanto got, he was very ill and could not move properly. Beth, Crisanto's beautiful wife, hired a helper to take care of Crisanto. She did not know, but she accidentally hired Florida. She also did not know that Florida and Crisanto have had a child. Days after, Beth decides that Florida's child can live in their house. Beth and Crisanto's child, Liza, a little girl who is seen taken care by her nanny Annie, and Flor became best friends without knowing that Flor is her half-sister. But later on, the affair was found out in Abra after Beth's suspicion grew. When Beth went to Abra to ask Ida if she was with Crisanto, Ida tried to lie, but Crisanto arrived with Liza, into Ida's house, greeting her in front of Beth until Crisanto saw her. Beth cried in tears and Crisanto tried to apologize, but Beth got mad and fought Crisanto, grabbed Liza and left Abra with Crisanto, Ida, and Flor in tears. Due to this, Liza broke ties with Flor and when Flor moved into her house, Liza kept bullying and fighting with Flor. But challenges and obstacles come to them. Will there ever be apologies and forgiveness in the end?

== Cast and characters ==
=== Main cast ===
- Ashley Sarmiento as Flor M. Maristela – Ida and Crisanto's daughter, Arnold and Beth's stepdaughter, and Liza's half-sister. She is an innocent little girl who befriends her half-sister Liza, who originally the girls are enemies before they are friends, Flor is very good at school, after she is accused for pushing her down the stairs, she realizes that it was Liza doing this to her, at the end of the series, she and Liza are saved by their father Crisanto, and she loses her mother Ida.
- Rhed Bustamante as Liza P. Maristela – Beth and Crisanto's daughter, and Flor's half-sister. Originally, she argues with her half-sister Flor, but she becomes best friends with her after she apologized to her for what she did to her as Flor forgives her for everything, at school, she had a huge fight with her female classmate, and she often gets in trouble for faking her broken arm and her blindness, after she faked her own blindness, her phone is destroyed by her father and her mother Beth kicked her out of the house as part of her attempt, however, after days, she apologized to her on her birthday, at the end of the series, she and Flor are saved by their father Crisanto.
- Jolina Magdangal as Florida "Ida" Malubay-Magsakay — Crisanto's ex-mistress and Flor's mother. She dies at the end of the series, leaving Arnold and Flor.
- Marvin Agustin as Crisanto Maristela — Flor & Liza's father, Beth's husband, and Ida's ex-lover. At the end of the series, he saved Flor and Liza from Daisy.
- Desiree del Valle as Elizabeth "Beth" S. Perez-Maristela — Crisanto's wife, Liza's mother, and Flor's stepmother. Originally, she hated Flor and wants her to stay away from Liza, but she apologized to her and loves her very much when Liza tries to argue with her, Beth is a very beautiful woman who supports Flor, after Liza faked her blindness, Beth attempts to kick her out of the house in anger and tears, however, on her birthday, she apologized to her, at the end of the series, after her hair is cut, she consoled Flor about Ida's death.
- Carlo Aquino as Arnold Magsakay — Florida's husband and Flor's stepfather. He becomes a widower to Flor after Ida dies at the end of the series.
- Valerie Concepcion as Teacher Daisy C. Hizon — Flor and Liza's dance teacher who has an obsession over Flor and Crisanto. Recruits Liza into her plans by emotionally manipulating her into believing her parents love Flor more than her. She later unfollows Liza after Beth attempts to kick her out of the house, at the end of the series, she tried to kidnap Flor and Liza but Crisanto saved the little girls, defeating her.

=== Supporting cast ===
- Elizabeth Oropesa as Lorena Sanchez-Perez — Beth's mother, Liza's grandmother, and Flor's step grandmother.
- Tetchie Agbayani as Teresa Malubay — Florida's mother and Flor's grandmother.
- Juan Rodrigo as Mariano "Nano" Perez — Beth's father, Liza's grandfather, and Flor's step grandfather who is a lung cancer survivor.
- Tess Antonio as Annie — The rude, talkative, argumentative, and overly dramatic housemaid of the Maristela family. She prefers Flor more than Liza, who originally prefers her before Flor's arrival, she often argues with Rona.
- Joey Paras as Rona — Beth's best friend who constantly argues with Annie. He cares deeply about Flor.
- Edward Mendez as Manuel "Manny" S. Perez — Beth's unemployed younger brother.
- Lemuel Pelayo as Jojo S. Perez — Beth's youngest brother.
- Johan Santos as Miguel Fontanillas — Crisanto's friend.
- Ronnie "Atak" Araña as Buslog Malubay — Teresa's adoptive son.
- Dionne Monsanto as Lynette Nacianceno-Perez — Manny's kindhearted wife.
- Lee Robin Salazar as Col. Francisco — Crisanto's best friend who was killed by the rebels.
- Debraliz Borres as Bebeng Magsakay — Arnold's aunt.
- Michael "Eagle" Riggs as Mama Wanda — Arnold's boss and the owner of the gay bar that Arnold works at.
- Ricky Rivero as Lawrence "Lolei" Alcantara — Arnold's kindhearted customer from the gay bar who helps with his finances.
- Wilma Doesnt as Dalisay Sulta — The manager of Lolei's department store.
- JC Santos as Jason — Arnold's workmate who despises him.
- Marco Pingol as Travis Marquez — Flor and Liza's neighbor and friend.
- Bugoy Cariño as Luke Marquez — Travis' older brother, Flor and Liza's neighbor who is also their friend.
- Carlo Maceda as Gener De Jesus — a man with a learning disability. At first, he looked like a big and scary aswang (a Filipino folklore, which is a monster who appears as a human during the day, but is a monster at night), but was misunderstood and wasn't an aswang. He later befriends Flor.
- JC Movido as Jenjen — Jason's autistic daughter.
- Juvy Lyn Bison as Jenny Perez — Manny and Lynette's daughter.
- Miguelito de Guzman as JC Perez — Manny and Lynette's son.

=== Guest cast ===
- Kiko Matos as Cornelio Maristela — Crisanto's brother, who joined the rebels.
- Rendon Labador as Lt. Samonte
- Arnold Reyes as Terrorist leader
- Nikki Valdez as Florida's friend
- Ya Chang as Mr. Chua — The financer of Teresa and Bebeng's store.
- Boom Labrusca as Luis Jacinto — One of Lolei's friends.
- Jan Marini as Joan Maristela — Cornelio's widower, who has an ailing son.
- Candy Pangilinan as Coring Magsakay — RJ's rude wife, who is a rent manager.
- Gerald Pizzaras as RJ Magsakay — Arnold's brother who attempted to molest Florida.
- Young JV as Dante — Lolei's friend.
- Francine Prieto as Atty. Grace Bruno — The lawyer helping Florida and Arnold get Flor's custody.
- Dante Ponce as Gen. Manuel Hizon — Daisy's father, who was killed by his wife and Daisy's mother, Divina.
- Yayo Aguila as Divina Cruz-Hizon — Daisy's mentally ill mother. Committed suicide shortly after killing Manuel.
- Casey da Silva as young Daisy
- Ricardo Cepeda as Benito Maristela — Crisanto's father.
- Rio Locsin as Imelda Maristela — Crisanto's mother.
- Jong Cuenco as Atty. Eric Gonzales — the Maristela family lawyer.
- Rubi Rubi as Corazon Aberion — the legal wife of Florida's father.
- Al Gatmaitan as Thomas — Daisy's friend.
- Carlos Morales as Congressman Roger Santos — Daisy's boyfriend.

== Reception ==
KANTAR MEDIA NATIONAL TV RATINGS (2:30PM PST)
Pilot Episode	Finale Episode	Peak	Average	Source
9.7%	16.6%	16.6%	13.1%	

== Broadcast ==
Initially meant to be part of ABS-CBN's PrimeTanghali noontime block, FlordeLiza was originally planned to replace Give Love on Christmas before It's Showtime. However, in a last-minute change, the timeslot was moved to be part of ABS-CBN's Kapamilya Gold afternoon block. The timeslot was after It's Showtime. Oh My G! was the one who took the timeslot before It's Showtime. It was moved to ABS-CBN's PrimeTanghali noontime block instead of the Primetime Bida evening block which the original timeslot is before TV Patrol which was the original plan.

== Re-runs ==
The show had re-runs on Jeepney TV from January 1 to April 19, 2018 (replacing the re-runs of Two Wives 2014); March 28 to October 3, 2020 (replacing the re-runs of The Greatest Love); March 17 to September 29, 2024 (replacing the re-runs of Hawak Kamay); and April 13 to July 31, 2026 (replacing the re-runs of Langit Lupa).

== International broadcasts ==
In Indonesia, the series was aired on RCTI in 2016, with Indonesian-dubbing.

== Awards and nominations ==
29th PMPC Star Awards for Television

- Best Daytime Drama - FlordeLiza (Nominated)
- Best Drama Actress - Jolina Magdangal (Nominated)
- Best Supporting Actor - Carlo Aquino (Nominated)
- Best Child Performer - Ashley Sarmiento (Nominated)

== See also ==
- List of programs broadcast by ABS-CBN
- List of ABS-CBN Studios original drama series
- List of programs broadcast by Jeepney TV
