= Anna Liza =

Philippine television drama series

- Title card
- Genre: Drama
- Created by: Rey Benedicto; Raynee Salgado
- Based on: Anna Liza (radio drama) by Rey Benedicto
- Written by: Benjamin Viernes
- Directed by: Gil C. Soriano
- Starring: Julie Vega
- Theme music composer: Michel Legrand
- Opening theme: "Le Messager"
- Country of origin: Philippines
- Original language: Tagalog

Production
- Camera setup: Multiple-camera setup
- Running time: 60 minutes
- Production companies: Happy Vision Corporation; Television International Corporation

Original release
- Network: GMA Radio-Television Arts
- Release: February 4, 1980 – September 13, 1985

Related
- Annaliza (2013)

Anna Liza is a Philippine television drama series broadcast by GMA Radio-Television Arts. Directed by Gil C. Soriano, it stars Julie Vega in the title role. It premiered on February 4, 1980 as the network's first primetime drama series. The series concluded on September 13, 1985.

A remake aired in 2013.

== Cast and characters ==
Lead cast

- Julie Vega as Anna Liza Santiago

Supporting cast

- Alicia Alonzo as Isabel Santiago
- Augusto Victa as Lazaro Santiago
- Daria Ramirez as Stella / Adela
- Valen Miranda as Ronnie
- Robert Arevalo as Greg
- Renato del Prado as Guido
- Rey Abellana as PJ
- Digna Kiocho as Cathy
- Leni Santos as Arlene
- Roderick Paulate as Ricky
- Albert Martinez as Glenn Laxamana
- Suzanne Gonzales as Lilian
- Delia Razon as PJ's mother
- Edgar Mande as Lester
- Alvin Canon as Rocky
- Melissa Mendez as Melissa
- Tony Carrion as Glenn's father
- Gloria Romero as Glenn's mother
- Mitos Canon as Mitos

Recurring cast

- Ester Chavez
- Anita Linda as Munda
- Celia Rodriguez
- Raquel Montesa
- Lina Pusing
- Gloria Ilagan
- Marissa Delgado as Elvie
- Liezl Martinez
- Sugar Benedicto as Sugar
- Manilyn Reynes
- Aiko Melendez
- Bobi Mercado
- Rocco Montalban as Abet
- Dina Bonnevie

== Production ==
The series was based on the eponymously radio drama series in Cebu in the 1970s, created by Rey Benedicto and Raynee Salgado. Anna Liza premiered in 1980 under a direction by Gil C. Soriano, and became one of the most popular drama series at the time. The series abruptly ended due to Julie Vega's sudden death, resulting in the serial having incomplete storylines.

== Ratings ==
The final episode of Anna Liza a 54% rating from PSRC on its final episode.

== Remake ==
In 2013, ABS-CBN remade Anna Liza after the rights to the said drama series was bought from its original director, Gil C. Soriano. Andrea Brillantes played the lead role.
