= Mirabella (TV series) =

2014 Philippine drama fantasy television series

- Title card
- Genre: Melodrama; Supernatural; Fantasy; Revenge; Romance
- Created by: ABS-CBN Studios; Rondel P. Lindayag
- Developed by: ABS-CBN Studios
- Written by: Noreen Capili; Joel Mercado
- Directed by: Erick C. Salud; Jerome C. Pobocan; Jojo A. Saguin; Claudio "Tots" Sanchez-Mariscal IV
- Starring: Julia Barretto; Enrique Gil; Sam Concepcion; Mika dela Cruz
- Opening theme: "Sabihin Mo Sa Akin" by Klarisse de Guzman
- Composer: Vincent de Jesus
- Country of origin: Philippines
- Original language: Tagalog
- No. of episodes: 73 (list of episodes)

Production
- Executive producers: Carlo Katigbak; Cory Vidanes; Laurenti Dyogi; Roldeo Endrinal
- Producers: Dagang Vilbar; Ethel Espiritu; Marissa V. Kalaw; Mae Santos
- Editor: Marion Bautista
- Running time: 25–30 minutes
- Production company: Dreamscape Entertainment

Original release
- Network: ABS-CBN
- Release: March 24 – July 4, 2014

Mirabella is a 2014 Philippine television drama series broadcast by ABS-CBN. Directed by Erick C. Salud, Jerome C. Pobocan, Jojo A. Saguin and Claudio "Tots" Sanchez-Mariscal IV, it stars Julia Barretto, Enrique Gil, Sam Concepcion and Mika dela Cruz. It aired on the network's Primetime Bida line up and worldwide on TFC from March 24 to July 4, 2014, replacing Annaliza, and was replaced by Pure Love.

The series is streaming online on YouTube.

== Synopsis ==
After joining a beauty contest, a beautiful woman named Daisy catches the attention of a judge. Entangled in forbidden love and adultery, the judge's wife Olivia soon finds out about her husband's affair. In anger, Olivia turns to a ritual through a mysterious tree and curses Daisy by taking away her beauty. Like the very same tree used in the ritual, Daisy's skin took on the same exact wood-like appearance.

After her mother's death, Mira was named and raised by her aunt. The result of the illicit affair between her mother and the married judge, Mira was also affected by the curse; her skin wooden-like similar to her mother. Due to her appearance, she was often ridiculed and targeted by bullies. Despite the many hardships she faced, she continues to have a positive outlook of life; finding comfort from those who genuinely cares about her. Crushing on a boy who seem to accept her for who she is regardless of her curse, she is humiliated once more when he betrays her and sides with her bullies.

Bitter and overwhelmed from the constant torment, Mira vows revenge to all people who have hurt her. With the help of a mysterious flower that blooms through her mother's statue, she is able to temporarily break the curse. Using her now beautiful appearance, she pushes to become famous as a new aspiring model named 'Bella'.

Those who have agonised her will pay.

== Cast and characters ==
=== Protagonist ===
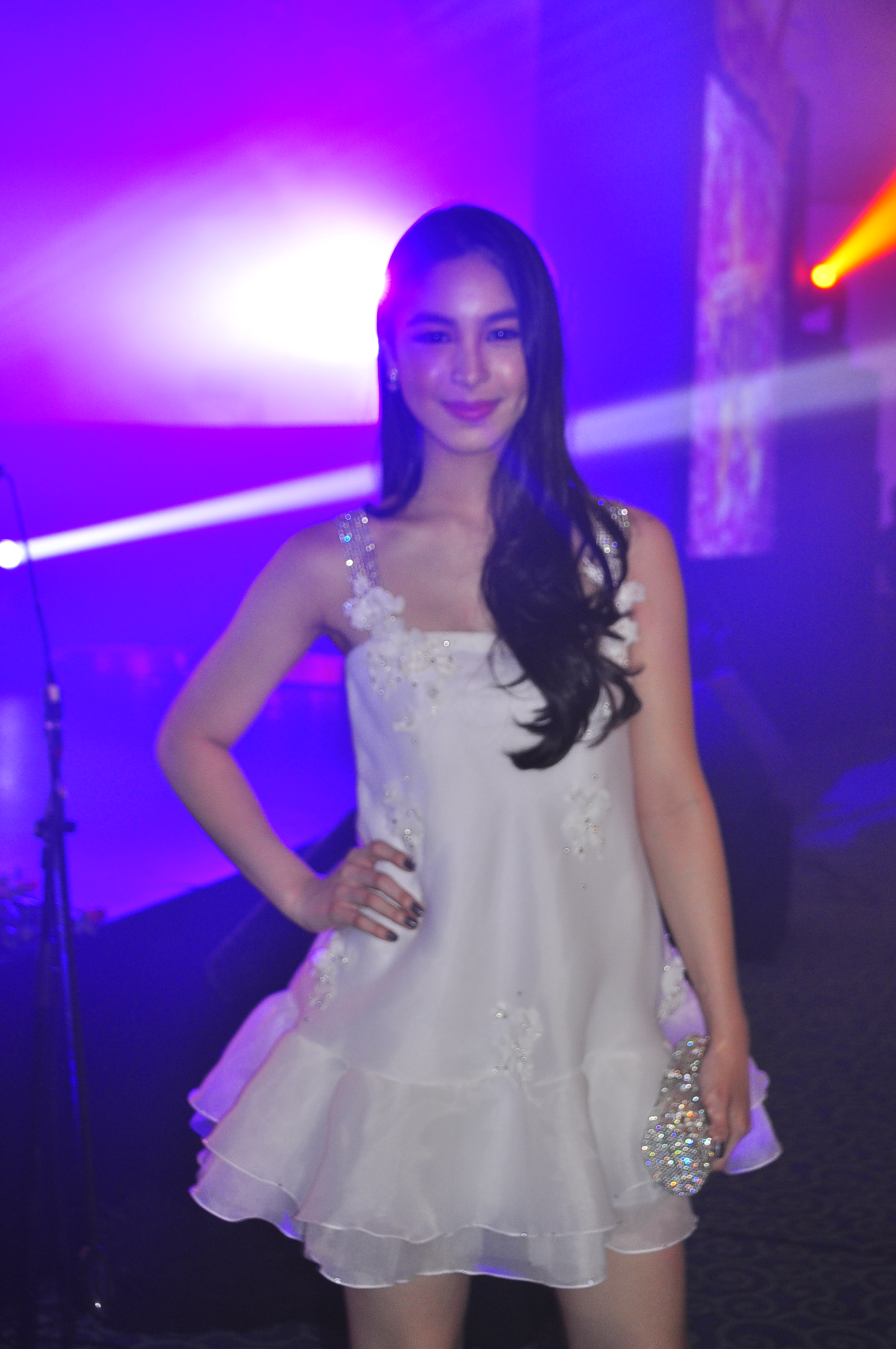
Julia Barretto portrays MiraBella Amarillo the Power of Mira against the Bad influences to her.

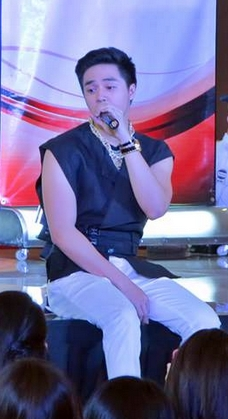
Sam Concepcion portrays Terrence Laurel the Brother Jeremy, But Later their Rivals to Feelings of Mira.

- Julia Barretto as Mira Arboleda / Mirabella Bella A. Robles
  - Alysson McBride as Young Mira / Bella Arboleda
- Enrique Gil as Jeremy Palmera
  - Parjan Santos as Young Jeremy Palmera
- Sam Concepcion as Terrence Laurel

=== Antagonist ===
- Mika dela Cruz as Iris F. Robles
  - Veyda Inoval as Young Iris Robles

=== Main cast ===
- Pokwang as Mimosa "Osang" Balete
- John Lapus as Rafael "Paeng" Amarillo
- Mylene Dizon as Olivia "Olive" Flores-Robles
- James Blanco as Alfred Robles
- Gloria Diaz as Lucia Magnolia Flores

=== Supporting cast ===
- Arlene Muhlach as Dahlia
- Liza Diño as Aster Palmera-Laurel
- DJ Durano as Manuel Laurel

=== Extended cast ===
- Makisig Morales as Jefferson
  - Maliksi Morales as Young Jefferson
- Alora Sasam as Marigold
  - Sofia Discher as Young Marigold
- Diego Loyzaga as Dave Castillo
- Ryle Paolo Santiago as Raphael Guzman
- Paulo Angeles as Nico
- Alexa Macanan as Violet
- Noemi Oineza as Lilac
- Nikki Bagaporo as Jasmin Bonifacio
- Marinella Sevidal as Rose
- Jose Sarasola as Benson
- Marvin Yap as Adonis
- Greggy Santos as Edward Chavez

=== Guest cast ===
- Angel Jacob as Petunia
- Marina Benipayo as Zenia "Ms. Z"
- Dianne Medina as Holly
- DJ Chacha as Herself
- Lander Vera Perez as Anthony
- Jhade Ellorin Soberano as Jade

=== Special participation ===
- Dimples Romana as Daisy Arboleda

== Soundtrack ==
- Sabihin Mo Sa Akin – Klarisse de Guzman
- Kulang Ako Kung Wala Ka – Aiza Seguerra

== Production ==
The series was first unveiled in May 2013 as an adaptation of Dominador Ad Castillo novel Cofradia. — The story centers on Cofradia, a young woman who is afraid to fall in love because of her dark complexion. With the help of a magic candle, she eventually transforms into a beautiful lady. The novel had film adaptations in 1953 and 1973.

However, due to criticisms over the material's alleged racism, Dreamscape Entertainment announced in July 2013 that it had re-worked into a new series to feature an original story that is "equally exciting and equally beautiful."

=== Cast changes ===
Diego Loyzaga and Kiko Estrada were originally part of the main cast, but was later replaced by Enrique Gil and Sam Concepcion respectively. Estrada returned to Annaliza, while Loyzaga later remained as part of the series in a supporting antagonist role instead. Liza Soberano was also reported to be part of the series, but later became part of Got to Believe instead. Soberano was later replaced by Mika dela Cruz. Later on Soberano and Gil worked together in Forevermore.

This is a second time of Julia and Sam to appear on the show, since Walang Kapalit in 2007.

== Reruns ==
The show began airing re-runs on Jeepney TV from October 7 to November 22, 2019; January 31 to May 13, 2022; December 23, 2024 to April 4, 2025; and October 26 to December 18, 2026.

== Reception ==
According to data from Kantar Media Philippines, Mirabella scored a national TV rating of 22% on its pilot episode on March 24, 2014. The highest rating was its final episode on July 4, 2014, scoring a 27.3%.

Kantar Media national TV ratings
Pilot episode	Finale episode	Peak	Average	Source
22%	27.3%	27.3%	19.6%	

== See also ==
- List of programs broadcast by ABS-CBN
- List of ABS-CBN Studios original drama series
- List of programs broadcast by Jeepney TV
