= List of Minsan Lang Kita Iibigin episodes =

The following is a list of episodes of ABS-CBN's Minsan Lang Kita Iibigin. This soap opera premiered on March 7, 2011, that centers on two separated twin brothers; a soldier and a rebel. It originally aired on 8:20–9:00 pm Monday to Friday time slot until June 6, 2011, when it was moved to 9:00–9:45 pm to give way for Guns and Roses. Since the time slot was changed, the ratings dropped as compared to Season 1 with an average of 30 million viewers but still reigns on its new timeslot with an average of 25 million viewers nightly. However the show regained its original audience in the last two weeks of airing, despite its late time slot.

== Series overview ==
Season	Episodes	Originally released	
Season	Episodes	First released	Last released
1	58	March 7, 2011	May 27, 2011
2	60	May 30, 2011	August 19, 2011

== Episodes ==
=== Season 1 ===
This season consisted of 58 episodes.

No. overall	No. in season	Title	Directed by	Written by	Ratings	Original release date	Nightly Rank
1	1	"Minsan May Simula"	Ruel S. Bayani; Darnel Joy R. Villaflor	Reggie Amigo	38.7%	March 7, 2011	#1
Alexander graduates from the Philippine Military Academy with honors. His father and grandfather are both high-ranking military officials. His mother comes in late for his graduation and embarrasses him in front of his friends by ignoring him. Alexander didn't have a very happy childhood and was left alone by his parents most of the time. His grandfather Jaime also forced him to be in the military. He also met Kaye when he was younger, a daughter of NPA rebels captured by his grandfather. On the night he was being forced to apply to military school, his younger brother insisted on tagging along with him when he went to his secret hiding place. Jaime Jr. gets into an accident and dies. Everyone blames him for it especially his mother Alondra. Guest stars: Mika Dela Cruz as Young Gabrielle "Gabby", Nash Aguas as Young Alexander Del Tierro, Khaycee Aboloc as Young Krista "Kaye", Bugoy Cariño as Jaime Del Tierro Jr., Dominic Ochoa as Mr. Matias and Yayo Aguila as Mrs. Matias
2	2	"Minsan Lang Nasa Bahay"	Ruel S. Bayani; Darnel Joy R. Villaflor	Reggie Amigo	32.5%	March 8, 2011	#2
Alexander together with his best friend Gabrielle celebrate their graduation at a local hang out but they get into a fight, bringing shame once again to his family. It seems he can't please his grandfather in any way. Joaquin visits a Lora Sebastian's grave and as he reminisces Lora is actually Alondra's half sister and his first love. Alondra came to live in the Sebastian household when her mother died. Lora leaves for the US and Joaquin and Alondra become close. But she mistakes this closeness for love and she soon becomes jealous of Lora. Lora suddenly distances herself from Joaquin and then goes missing. Lora he loves to Tomas. It is said she secretly met up with her estranged mother and the bus she was on was attacked by rebels and exploded. Alondra consoles Joaquin and something happens between them. Jaime becomes furious when he returns home to find her daughter with a baby that Joaquin is adamant to accept. Special Guest stars: Kim Chiu as Young Alondra Sebastiano, Erich Gonzales as Young Lora Sebastiano/ Rosa, Xian Lim as Young Joaquin Del Tierro, Albert Martinez as Young Jaime Sebastiano and Agot Isidro as Remedios Sebastiano
3	3	"Minsan Lang Magka-Misyon"	Ruel S. Bayani; Darnel Joy R. Villaflor	Reggie Amigo	33.1%	March 9, 2011	#3
To prove himself to his grandfather, Alexander immediately accepts a mission with Gabrielle. They are to pursue a group of rebels. On the other hand, there is a rebel named Javier, who lives in a far-off camp from the town where Alexander is. Life is hard and supplies are hard to go by. With Javier and a girl named Kaye and both are eager to support their group's cause. They soon plan to attack a nearby town but the government just sent more troops to protect it.
4	4	"Minsan Lang Nakaharap"	Ruel S. Bayani; Darnel Joy R. Villaflor	Reggie Amigo	33.5%	March 10, 2011	#3
Alondra suspects that Joaquin might be having an affair with another woman. Meanwhile, the rebels try to get into the military camp to steal some of their food and equipment. Alexander gets into an encounter with one of the rebels. When he removes his nemesis' mask, he is shocked to see his own face staring at him. Both try to injure one another but both of their camps manage to rescue them.
5	5	"Minsan Lang Magkapatid"	Ruel S. Bayani; Darnel Joy R. Villaflor	Reggie Amigo	33.6%	March 11, 2011	#3
Javier and Alexander both needed blood transfusions. Rosa volunteers for Javier while Joaquin gives his blood for Alexander. When the two wake up, they both ask the people around them if they have twins. Rosa and Bernabe say that Javier was alone when they saved him in a burning house in Zambales. Alondra tells Alexander that she should know if he had a twin because she's the one who gave birth to him. But Javier and Alexander can't shrug the strange feeling off. And both are determined to find out the truth. Guest stars: Melissa Mendez as Kaye's Mother, Allan Paule as Kaye's Father, Nina Ricci Alagao as Hilda, Khaycee Aboloc as Young Krista "Kaye", and Nash Aguas as Young Alexander Del Tierro.
6	6	"Minsan Lang Nag Pasabog"	Ruel S. Bayani; Darnel Joy R. Villaflor	Reggie Amigo	31.8%	March 14, 2011	#3
Alexander is now ready to return to his post but he is very sure that his parents are keeping something about the past from him. Javier is also thinking the same about his own past and could not just rely on the story Bernabe is telling him. Alondra on the other hand is worried that Xander might just find out the truth and she can’t let it happen. She has worked hard all her life to win Joaquin’s love and make him forget Lora, her sister. Gabrielle joins the mission that will penetrate the rebel camp. Here she manages to capture one rebel and when she tells him to remove his mask, she is stunned, for he looks exactly like Alexander. Guest stars: Melissa Mendez as Kaye's Mother, Allan Paule as Kaye's Father, and Khaycee Aboloc as Young Krista "Kaye"
7	7	"Minsan Lang Magka-Salamin"	Ruel S. Bayani; Darnel Joy R. Villaflor	Reggie Amigo	33%	March 15, 2011	#3
Gabby now believes in what Alexander told her, but Javier manages to escape. Meanwhile Krista/Kaye was sent to a mission in town by their camp leader to get a message to one of their supporters. And since it was their asset’s birthday she gets drunk with some of the locals. She mistakes Alexander for Javier, confesses her love for him and even kisses him. Confused, Alexander tries to take her home and as they walk in the woods, Alexander once again spots Javier talking with Bernabe.
8	8	"Minsan Lang Makilala"	Ruel S. Bayani; Darnel Joy R. Villaflor	Reggie Amigo	34.1%	March 16, 2011	#3
Alexander leaves Krista/Kaye in the woods for her friends to find. Krista finds it weird when Javier apologizes. She thinks it was about the kiss, but Javier was just saying sorry for his jokes. Elena asks Bernabe if he knows of a way to make Rosa’s bad dreams go away but he says only specialists in the city can help her. Elena says all Rosa tells her is that a taxi hit her before she went into a coma. Meanwhile Alondra fears Joaquin’s anger more than going to jail when the truth about Alexander is exposed. She asks Mimi to take her to a grave. She then recalls stealing her sister’s baby and use it to gain Joaquin’s love. Mimi said only three of them know of the crime, including her cousin who buried the baby’s dead twin and is now living abroad. But Alondra wants to make sure and wants the body exhumed.
9	9	"Minsan Lang Naalala"	Ruel S. Bayani; Darnel Joy R. Villaflor	Reggie Amigo	33.2%	March 17, 2011	#3
Alondra recalls her past, how she learned her mother was a mistress, how her mother died trying to stop her from going after her father’s family and her eventually living there after her mom’s death. She insists on having the grave exhumed. Meanwhile, Alexander manages to kidnap Javier from his post. He tells him that they are connected and they have to find out about their past. Javier fears this is all a trap and tries to fight out his freedom with Alexander. Special Guest stars: Kim Chiu as Young Alondra Sebastiano, Angel Aquino as Teresa Valderosa, Albert Martinez as Young Jaime Sebastiano, Erich Gonzales as Young Lora Sebastiano/ Rosa, Xian Lim as Young Joaquin Del Tierro, and Agot Isidro as Remedios Sebastiano. Guest star: Eda Nolan as Young Mimi
10	10	"Minsan Lang Kita Kakausapin"	Ruel S. Bayani; Darnel Joy R. Villaflor	Reggie Amigo	33%	March 18, 2011	#3
The twins stop fighting in time for Rosa and some rebels have come looking for Javier. Alexander manages to hide behind some rocks. Both are now more curious about their real identities. Alexander and Gabrielle are then assigned an important mission by his grandfather Jaime. Javier attempts to contact Alexander by passing him a note at a military check point. They meet once again inside the cave and finally introduce themselves formally with one another.
11	11	"Minsan Lang Nag-Bonding"	Ruel S. Bayani; Darnel Joy R. Villaflor	Reggie Amigo	33%	March 21, 2011	#3
Alexander and Javier draw to an agreement without disregarding their principles. The twins meet again in a forest where no one could see them, they talked about their past and the life they live now. As the conversation progressed, Xander realised the possibility that maybe the two of them are both adopted by their known parents. He thanks Javier for meeting him and is happy that he can finally call someone - family. Alexander goes back to camp with a great mood making Gabrielle curious. The brother's relationship grows much better. With Javier interested to learn about his past, Rosa allows him to go downtown and find the answers to his questions. On the other hand, Alondra is still disturbed with what she did years ago. Guest star: Nash Aguas as Young Javier
12	12	"Minsan Lang Nasa Bayan"	Ruel S. Bayani; Darnel Joy R. Villaflor	Reggie Amigo	32.5%	March 22, 2011	#3
Alexander and Javier live each other's lives. The twins are now in the move to find the answers to their questions. Xander shows Javier their house knowing that only his nanny is there. Javier is happy being at his brother's house where all the things he couldn't have with the rebels are there. As for Krista and the other rebels, they are worried that Javier might not go back to be with them. Rosa believes that he will not disappoint her and will eventually come back. Meanwhile, Alondra wants the said child they buried to be DNA Tested. Baby John is the said twin brother of Xander whom Alondra believed is dead.
13	13	"Minsan Lang Nagka-Date"	Ruel S. Bayani; Darnel Joy R. Villaflor	Reggie Amigo	N/A	March 23, 2011	N/A
Javier is totally smitten with Gabrielle. Javier goes for a haircut so he could impersonate his brother. Gabby goes out with Javier whom she thinks is Alexander. Meanwhile, Alondra is pissed when her father - Jaime visits the jewelry shop to scold her. Mad that Alondra isn't taking good care of her business. Alondra can't forget how painful her past was with her father. Alondra orders her workers to dig the said twin brother of Xander to get samples for the DNA test. Guest star: Nash Aguas as Young Javier
14	14	"Minsan Lang Nagka-Maling Ideya"	Ruel S. Bayani; Darnel Joy R. Villaflor	Reggie Amigo	31.5%	March 24, 2011	#3
Alexander and Javier continue to fool the people around them with their switch. Eventually, Javier goes back home. Rosa is glad to see him back at camp. With Javier's new look, Krista feels more attracted to him. On the other hand, Jaime questions Alexander's actions. Alondra gives the samples to begin the DNA Test and she wants the result to be confidential. Later Alondra visits Joaquin at his office and sees a woman with him. Alondra mistakenly accuses him of cheating and because of this Joaquin asks for space.
15	15	"Minsan Lang Lumabas Ang DNA Resulta"	Ruel S. Bayani; Darnel Joy R. Villaflor	Reggie Amigo	32.4%	March 25, 2011	#3
Krista is very happy with the fake Javier's concern for her. Alexander is happy to be with Krista again so when Javier asks him to exchange places, he doesn’t complain. Javier on the other hand is also enjoying his time with Gabrielle, Xander’s best friend. However, the military and the rebels have another encounter with each other. And both brothers fear they might get caught.
16	16	"Minsan Lang Hulihin"	Ruel S. Bayani; Darnel Joy R. Villaflor	Reggie Amigo	32%	March 28, 2011	#3
Alexander and Javier are torn between love and principle. The military attacked the rebel camp and Ka Diego explains that someone may have seen him at one of the farms and followed him. Krista and Ibon are caught and they pretend to be husband and wife. The rebels wanted to save them but Ka Diego tells them to wait for he believes the two can talk their way out of the charges. Alondra continues to suspect Alexander’s twin is alive after the receiving the DNA results.
17	17	"Minsan Lang Sinundan"	Ruel S. Bayani; Darnel Joy R. Villaflor	Reggie Amigo	31.3%	March 29, 2011	#3
The Kilusan is surprised at Javier's sudden change of heart upon his return. Javier feels Xander is endangering the rebels with what he is doing, but he tells his brother the mission was not his idea. Rosa feels something is very different with Javier after he returned from town. Krista and Ibon were finally cleared from being rebels but she recognizes Gabrielle’s grandfather as the one who killed her parents. However, their release was just another tactic so the military’s spies can follow them to their hide out. Xander has been following the two was mistakenly knocked out by Krista. Guest stars: Nash Aguas as Young Alexander Del Tierro, Khaycee Aboloc as Young Krista "Kaye"
18	18	"Minsan Ulit Nagkita"	Ruel S. Bayani; Darnel Joy R. Villaflor	Reggie Amigo	31.9%	March 30, 2011	#2
Krista nurses back to health a familiar face. In another encounter with the rebels, Ka Diego is captured and Bernabe injured. Rosa is affected when she sees Joaquin at the military camp. An asset reports that Xander is captured by the rebels so Joaquin asks his father-in-law to have the rebel camp stormed but Jaime says his grandson can take care of himself. What surprised Joaquin was seeing Javier outside the camp, thinking he is Xander. Guest stars: Nash Aguas as Young Alexander Del Tierro, Khaycee Aboloc as Young Krista "Kaye"
19	19	"Minsan Lang Na Bitag Ang Magulang"	Ruel S. Bayani; Darnel Joy R. Villaflor	Reggie Amigo	31.3%	March 31, 2011	#3
Javier has to keep up with every pretense to convince everyone that he is Alexander. Thinking his son is in danger, Joaquin takes Javier home to Manila. On the other hand Alexander has yet to regain consciousness and Bernanbe feels they have to take him to a clinic if the situation doesn’t change soon. Javier hopes Xander is ok and would understand what happened between them. Javier gets another encounter with Alondra and she feels something is different with Xander.
20	20	"Minsan Akong Hindi Nagbago"	Ruel S. Bayani; Darnel Joy R. Villaflor	Reggie Amigo	30.5%	April 1, 2011	#3
Javier is on the verge of being caught by the people around him. Javier gets to spend time with Joaquin and feels very happy to bond with his father. However his actions are found odd not only by Alondra but Jaime as well. Alexander finds a way to contact Javier and tells him they will soon find the right time to switch places. Javier warns his brother of snakes in the forest and Alexander warns him to be careful of the people in their house. Meanwhile Alexander is becoming more romantic towards Krista while Javier is slowly getting to know Gabrielle. Guest stars: Nash Aguas as Young Alexander Del Tierro, Khaycee Aboloc as Young Krista "Kaye"
21	21	"Minsan Maalaala Mo Kaya"	Ruel S. Bayani; Darnel Joy R. Villaflor	Reggie Amigo	32%	April 4, 2011	#3
Alexander and Javier’s switch will come to an end. Alexander and Javier agrees to stay and live each other's lives for now. On the other hand, Alondra recalls her past. The incident that got rid of her half sister - Lora. Lora was once comatosed after being hit by a car. Lora was pregnant having two babies. Once she was on labor, Alondra takes the other baby with her - Alexander. Now being haunted with the past, how will Alondra continue living peacefully? Guest stars: Nash Aguas as Young Alexander Del Tierro, Khaycee Aboloc as Young Krista "Kaye"
22	22	"Minsan Lang Aminin Ang Pagmamahal"	Ruel S. Bayani; Darnel Joy R. Villaflor	Reggie Amigo	30.3%	April 5, 2011	#3
Alondra continues to doubt if she is living with the same Alexander she's known for years. The sweet relationship of the twin brothers to their loved ones grows much deeper. Alexander, who is Javier, finally courts Gabrielle. Javier, who is Alexander, is going to court Krista. Edgardo gives his support to Javier, whom he thinks is Alexander, in loving his granddaughter - Gabby.
23	23	"Minsan Lang Hanapin Ang Katotohanan"	Ruel S. Bayani; Darnel Joy R. Villaflor	Reggie Amigo	31.5%	April 6, 2011	#3
Alexander and Javier can't keep up with each other's life anymore. Gabrielle is happy that she finally has a relationship with Alexander from which she's been wanting years ago. Same with Krista where they are back together with Javier. Javier who is in Xander's place, saw Ka Diego with the Militars. Jaime wants Xander to be back at the camp to perform his duties. Joaquin still wants his son to transfer where he is assigned so that he could look after him. With this Alexander immediately calls Javier informing him that they must exchange places already to clear things out. Meanwhile, Alondra yearns for the truth about Xander, to do so she decides to spy on him and with the help of Mimi.
24	24	"Minsan Mong Mahalin Ang Sarili Mo, Para Malaman Mo Kung Gano Kahirap"	Ruel S. Bayani; Darnel Joy R. Villaflor	Reggie Amigo	30.7%	April 7, 2011	#3
Alondra slowly figures out how Alexander's twin survived. Elena sees Alondra once again after twenty-one years, she immediately reports this to Rosa. Meanwhile, Alondra tells Mimi that she indeed saw - Alexander and his twin brother. Jaime is ready to transfer his family to another house for their protection after their encounter with the rebels. The rebels transfers house once again to hide from the Militars. Alexander and Javier switch back to their normal lives. Both twin brothers are experiencing hard time as they aren't used to being with each other's girlfriends.
25	25	"Minsan Lang Ikaw Sumaya"	Ruel S. Bayani; Darnel Joy R. Villaflor	Reggie Amigo	30%	April 8, 2011	#3
Alexander and Javier's cover are almost blown after spending time with their girlfriends. Elena questions Javier concerning the latter's actions with Krista. He has insulted her by pushing her away when she was just trying to kiss him. Elena is worried that Javier is getting used to the things in town, a reason why he's acting differently. As for Alondra, she borrows Mimi's car to spy on Alexander once again. The twin brothers meet up, as they were both talking, Xander catches a glimpse of his mother - Alondra. Thus causing concern to Alexander that his mother has seen him with Javier.
26	26	"Minsan Lang Nagmahal, Sa Maling Tao Pa"	Ruel S. Bayani; Darnel Joy R. Villaflor	Reggie Amigo	32.7%	April 11, 2011	#2
Alondra fears what she might discover as she continues to snoop around. Javier is worried that Krista is making him decide towards their relationship. Since Javier doesn't know how to deal with this already, he calls Alexander. With this, Alexander wants to exchange places once again with Javier so that they can sort things out. As Alondra continues to spy on Alexander she discovers him kissing a rebel - Krista. Javier goes to see Gabby also to remind her of his dying love and loyalty towards her.
27	27	"Minsan Lang Lumaban Sa Batas"	Ruel S. Bayani; Darnel Joy R. Villaflor	Reggie Amigo	33.2%	April 12, 2011	#1
Will Javier finally reveal himself to Alexander's side of the family? Alondra finally meets Javier together with Alexander. The three had a serious talk about what Alondra have discovered. Xander asks his mother not to tell anyone about his brother since his life will be at risk. An army must not make friends with a rebel and so with a rebel to an army. Javier who is not going to let time pass, asks Alondra if Xander is adopted. If not, therefore Javier is also Alondra's son. Alondra lies and tells both of them that she doesn't know how Alexander has a twin brother for which she blames Mimi.
28	28	"Minsan Lang Lapitan Ang Kalaban"	Ruel S. Bayani; Darnel Joy R. Villaflor	Reggie Amigo	29.4%	April 13, 2011	#2
Alondra fears that Joaquin will discover that Alexander has a twin. To protect herself and the new secret she has discovered, Alondra calls Mimi, she informs Mimi about what she found out and tells Mimi to make an alibi on why she hid the truth about Alexander and Javier. Meanwhile, Bernabe is worried that Joaquin is in their village. Afraid that Joaquin might see Lora/Rosa. Special Guest stars: Kim Chiu as Young Alondra Sebastiano and Angel Aquino as Teresa Valderosa
29	29	"Minsan Lang Ibintang"	Ruel S. Bayani; Darnel Joy R. Villaflor	Reggie Amigo	30.9%	April 14, 2011	#2
Krista uses Berto to get inside information from the military. Being so curious, Berto questions Krista's personality and later asks her to go out for coffee to find more information. Krista assures Javier that there is nothing to worry about because she handled things just the way it is. On the other hand, Mimi talks to the twins and Alondra concerning their separation.
30	30	"Minsan May Puso Sa Ilalim Ng Baril"	Ruel S. Bayani; Darnel Joy R. Villaflor	Reggie Amigo	29.4%	April 15, 2011	#3
Everybody is surprised at Alexander and Javier's change of hearts towards their enemies. Javier is with Alondra to clear some things regarding the past. He is curious to know about why Alondra treats his brother - Alexander differently. Jaime arrives home with company to have dinner and to discuss the hunt of rebels. Javier hears how Jaime is eager to capture his fellow rebels. Eventually, Alondra bonds with Javier to have fun and forget about what he has heard.
31	31	"Minsan Lang Iniimbestigahan"	Ruel S. Bayani; Darnel Joy R. Villaflor	Reggie Amigo	29.3%	April 18, 2011	#3
Alexander questions Alondra's surprising treatment to Javier. Berto visits the restaurant where Krista works, with his task to prove that she is a rebel. Elena warns her to be careful of Berto since he seems very inquisitive. Xander confronts Alondra and asks him why he told Javier about Jaime Jr. dying because of him. Elena wonders why Javier isn’t opening up to them about his trip but he just tells them nothing important happened. Meanwhile Alondra continues to be nice towards Javier and even drives him up to near the rebel camp. Norberto spots her there and wonders what Alondra was doing but she says she’s visiting her husband. But while having lunch with Joaquin, Alondra is horrified as she spots Lora at the restaurant.
32	32	"Minsan Pinagakalang Patay"	Ruel S. Bayani; Darnel Joy R. Villaflor	Reggie Amigo	31.4%	April 19, 2011	#2
Krista becomes the target of the military forces. Alondra could not believe her eyes but when Joaquin looks behind him, Rosa's gone. Alondra is alarmed and asks Mimi if it is possible Lora is alive. She knows the perfect person to help her with her search, Javier. she promises to send him a photograph of Lora as soon as possible. With Berto frequenting the restaurant, Javier warns Krista not to get too close, but she regards din as jealousy. The rebels take precaution but it may be too late as intelligence is slowly able to pinpoint who they are one by one.
33	33	"Minsan May Litrato"	Ruel S. Bayani; Darnel Joy R. Villaflor	Reggie Amigo	28.2%	April 20, 2011	#3
After hearing Bernabe's plan of freeing Ka Diego, Javier opposes saying there must be another way around it. The other rebels find it weird that he's being nice to the military. Alexander doesn't tell Javier of their plans to spy on the rebels. Javier asks him if they can swap places soon but he realizes Alexander is in town when he spots Gabrielle and Berto. Javier knows they are out to arrest all of them. Meanwhile at the restaurant, Alexander knows he has to choose between love and duty to the country.
34	34	"Minsan Buhay Ang Utang, Buhay Ang Kabayaran"	Ruel S. Bayani; Darnel Joy R. Villaflor	Reggie Amigo	28.6%	April 25, 2011	#2
The military does a raid at the restaurant and captures some of the rebels. Javier escapes before anyone notices he and Xander look alike. Krista prompts the other rebels to do an ‘ambush’ to save both Ka Diego and her brother Ka Tiago. Rosa catches Javier talking to Alondra on the phone and they get into a heated argument especially now that they are suspecting Javier of leaving the cause. Javier apologizes later on and says he will forever be grateful to Rosa even though she is not his biological mother.
35	35	"Minsan Tumapang"	Ruel S. Bayani; Darnel Joy R. Villaflor	Reggie Amigo	31.7%	April 26, 2011	#2
The rebels attack the military camp as they were transferring the rebels. An exchange of gunfire ensues and Krista’s brother Ka Tiago gets shot by Alexander. Rosa meanwhile follows Javier into town and suspects he’s meeting with his real family. Here, Alondra spots Rosa and confirms her suspicions that Rosa or her sister Lora is still alive. She becomes more paranoid towards Joaquin, making him wonder why she’s becoming more possessive of him.
36	36	"Minsan Lang Iniwan at Habulin"	Ruel S. Bayani; Darnel Joy R. Villaflor	Reggie Amigo	26.9%	April 27, 2011	#3
Will Javier leave the family that raised him for his real family? The rebels plan to move up to the mountains again. Bernabe and Rosa know they can’t stop Javier if he wants to leave. Elena tries to talk him out of his plans but it seems Javier feels he might be a hindrance to the cause and it would be better if he left the group. The rebels are informed that the case against Ka Diego and Ka Tiago are being fast-tracked at the courts so they can be convicted soon.
37	37	"Minsan Nagmahal Ang Militar Sa Rebelde"	Ruel S. Bayani; Darnel Joy R. Villaflor	Reggie Amigo	30.8%	April 28, 2011	#2
Alondra plays "good mother" to Javier. Joaquin wants Xander to accompany his mother at the grand opening of their store. However plans change when Alondra calls him up to tell him his brother Javier might be staying at home for a while and will be the one to go with her at the party. Alondra tries to pry information on Rosa. She then realizes that Rosa is Lora and that Lora is with her mother. Alondra also knows she has discovered Jaime’s secret. Meanwhile, it was Jaime’s strategy to release news of the rebel’s case trial for he knows their comrades will try to rescue them. Xander and Javier switch places at the hotel. Javier is basking in Alondra’s attention and doesn’t even notice that she’s fishing for information about Rosa. On the other hand, Krista and the other rebels plan to kidnap Alondra at her store opening to get back at Jaime and bargain for the release of Ka Diego and Ka Tiago.
38	38	"Minsan Lang Kidnapin"	Ruel S. Bayani; Darnel Joy R. Villaflor	Reggie Amigo	29.5%	April 29, 2011	#2
Alondra falls in the hands of the rebels. Krista and company pretend to be guests at Alondra’s store opening. Guest stars: Nash Aguas as Young Alexander Del Tierro
39	39	"Minsan May Pagkakataon Gumanti"	Ruel S. Bayani; Darnel Joy R. Villaflor	Reggie Amigo	30.6%	May 2, 2011	#1
Alexander and Javier's family fully intertwine with the soldiers and rebels' conflict. Alexander manages to hide inside the bathroom so his father only sees Javier sleeping beside Alondra. Krista and her group hides Jaime in a secret house. She keeps what happened a secret from Rosa and Bernabe. Krista feels guilty about taking Jaime hostage. She and the group calls up the military and tell them they don’t want it leaked to the media and requests only for peaceful negotiations. Meanwhile Alexander can’t continue with his normal life with Javier around. He calls Gabrielle one day, only to find out Javier is already speaking to her on the other line. Alondra hugs him too and mistakes him for Javier. She becomes uneasy when he tells her he’s Xander. Alexander is starting to feel jealous of Javier and Alondra’s closeness.
40	40	"Minsan Mabaril"	Ruel S. Bayani; Darnel Joy R. Villaflor	Reggie Amigo	30%	May 3, 2011	#2
General Sebastiano continues to find ways on how to escape from the rebels. Ka Diego and Ka Tiago hasn’t seen Jaime for days now and no one has spoken of their trial.
41	41	"Minsan Muling Nagsama: Unang Yugto"	Ruel S. Bayani; Darnel Joy R. Villaflor	Reggie Amigo	28.4%	May 4, 2011	#3
Alexander's jealousy and hatred for Javier deepens. Bernabe and some rebels see what they can do for the general’s gunshot wound.
42	42	"Minsan Muling Nagsama: Pangalawang Yugto"	Ruel S. Bayani; Darnel Joy R. Villaflor	Reggie Amigo	32.3%	May 5, 2011	#3
Javier learns of the general’s condition as soon as he arrives at camp. Special Guest stars: Kim Chiu as Young Alondra Sebastiano, Angel Aquino as Teresa Valderosa, Albert Martinez as Young Jaime Sebastiano, Erich Gonzales as Young Lora Sebastiano, Xian Lim as Young Joaquin Del Tierro, and Agot Isidro as Young Remedios Sebastiano.
43	43	"Minsan Muling Nagsama: Pangatlong Yugto"	Ruel S. Bayani; Darnel Joy R. Villaflor	Reggie Amigo	32.8%	May 6, 2011	#3
Lora/Rosa finally reveals herself to Joaquin. Javier feels Alexander betrayed him and the two fight once more. Krista sees them fighting from afar and only recognizes Alexander and shoots the other man. Joaquin and Gen. Marcelo were distracted by the sound of gunfire and Bernabe and the two women were able to arm themselves again and escape. Joaquin is distraught for he knows Lora is dead and Gen. Marcelo tells him the truth. Elena/Remedios got really hurt after Jaime brought home Alondra for after she has sacrificed everything, her family and the cause, he even had the gall to cheat on her. She soon returned to the mountains but kept in touch with her daughter Lora. Jaime and Lora had a fight the day that she disappeared and eventually went to join her mother and the rebels. Jaime was also very affected to the point he declared both dead. Meanwhile, Alondra gets a call saying her father has been found and is in critical condition at the hospital. Alexander on the other hand, manages to meet up in the forest with Gabrielle, who gets into an accident and sprains her ankle. Krista sees him helping out Gabrielle and she assumes Javier betrayed their cause. Special Guest stars: Kim Chiu as Young Alondra Sebastiano, Albert Martinez as Young Jaime Sebastiano, Erich Gonzales as Young Lora Sebastiano, Agot Isidro as Young Remedios Sebastiano and Xian Lim as Young Joaquin Del Tierro.
44	44	"Minsan Magkakalamat Ang Pagsasama"	Ruel S. Bayani; Darnel Joy R. Villaflor	Reggie Amigo	30.8%	May 9, 2011	#2
General Sebastiano recovers from severe injury. Krista confronts Javier about what she saw and he had no other choice but to tell her about his family and Alexander. Krista doesn’t believe him and says he’s just lying and he has betrayed them. Alondra’s greatest fear has come true; Lora is indeed alive and Joaquin has seen her. Jaime admits to keeping this a secret believing it wouldn’t have affected Joaquin and Alondra’s lives. But Joaquin couldn’t answer when Jaime asks him if he still loves Lora, and this further hurts Alondra. Javier angrily calls Alexander for revealing their camp’s location to the military. He says he will no longer treat Xander as his brother and the next time he sees him, he will not have second thoughts of killing his twin.
45	45	"Minsan Planong Sabihin Ang Totoo"	Ruel S. Bayani; Darnel Joy R. Villaflor	Reggie Amigo	32.8%	May 10, 2011	#1
Joaquin promises Alondra he will never leave her despite Lora being alive. Xander hears them talking and they explain to him what happened. After Joaquin leaves, Xander says he wants to tell his father of Javier’s existence. Alondra stops him for it would surely lead to complications. Jaime was forced to confess to Gen. Marcelo that it was Remedios who helped him escape from the rebels. Meanwhile the rebels want to find out who the traitor is, the one who let the prisoner escape and the one who led the military to their new camp. Ibon keeps hinting at Krista to expose Javier but in the end she does not. Javier on the other hand knows Bernabe, Rosa and Elena are keeping something from him.
46	46	"Minsan Lang Isumbong"	Ruel S. Bayani; Darnel Joy R. Villaflor	Reggie Amigo	34.9%	May 11, 2011	#2
Ibon reveals to the rebels that it is Javier who betrayed them. He tells them he heard Javier and Krista talking about it and the former admitted to having a relationship to Gabrielle. Bernabe tried to defend Javier but Krista supported Ibon’s claims. A council is to be formed and will judge Javier’s fate. Jaime asks Gen. Marcelo to keep Lora and Remedios’ existence a secret but the general says he can’t hide the truth forever and it will be revealed soon enough. Alondra feels Joaquin is becoming distant and she tells Mimi she will do anything to destroy Lora’s life, including her sons Javier and Alexander. Special Guest stars: Erich Gonzales as Young Lora Sebastiano and Xian Lim as Young Joaquin Del Tierro
47	47	"Minsan Nag Traydor"	Ruel S. Bayani; Darnel Joy R. Villaflor	Reggie Amigo	34.1%	May 12, 2011	#1
Rosa wants to help Javier escape and Elena and Bernabe agree to come along with her. However Rosa tries to talk to Krista to retract what she said at the council. Krista tries to save Javier but after Javier blurts out that he has a twin who is responsible for the betrayal, the council gives him the verdict of death, to be carried out the following morning. Krista, Bernabe, Rosa and Elena try to set Javier free but Ibon botches their plans.
48	48	"Minsan Hindi Inaasahang Magkasalubong"	Ruel S. Bayani; Darnel Joy R. Villaflor	Reggie Amigo	35%	May 13, 2011	#1
The troops attack the rebels who were still arguing about Javier’s punishment. Elena, Rosa, Krista, Bernabe and Javier manage to run in the opposite direction and escape the military. Xander was however sharp to see them and runs after them. Gabrielle follows suit. The group decides to separate and Krista goes with Javier while Bernabe takes Elena and Rosa. Javier and Xander come face to face with each other as both try to stop Krista and Gabrielle from shooting the other. The two women were in shock seeing they are twins. Gabrielle and Krista both become very angry because of their lies. Xander persuades Javier to go with him and reveals Rosa and Elena’s true identities. Meanwhile, while hiding in some bushes Elena and Rosa see Gen. Marcelo and Joaquin walking towards them.
49	49	"Minsan Laban Ng Buhay At Pagibig"	Ruel S. Bayani; Darnel Joy R. Villaflor	Reggie Amigo	32.7%	May 16, 2011	#1
After revealing Alexander and Javier's existence to both parties, confusion and anger surface in their families. Javier and Krista get into a fight with Xander and Gabrielle and both unexpectedly burst out where the military was gathering the captured rebels. Joaquin and the rest are shocked to see two Alexanders and the rebels take this as a chance to escape. However Javier gets shot in the scuffle. Bernabe was also surprised for apparently he had something to do with Javier and Xander’s separation. Rosa ran for the woods, unnoticed by Elena. Elena then rushes to Javier’s side, surrendering herself. At the hospital, Joaquin was very angry at Xander for keeping his twin’s existence a secret. He becomes more furious when he learns that Alondra knew of this fact all along. He tells her that if he finds out she’s lying about their sons, he will have no second thoughts of leaving her.
50	50	"Minsan Tumakbo"	Ruel S. Bayani; Darnel Joy R. Villaflor	Reggie Amigo	31.5%	May 17, 2011	#1
Elena explains to Krista how she is related to Javier, Xander and Jaime Sebastiano. Krista is puzzled how a grandson of a military man be separated from his family and gets adopted by rebels. Elena says Bernabe is definitely their key to knowing the truth as he was the one who found Javier in a burning apartment. Mimi is called in by Jaime at the hospital to explain if what Alondra is saying about her involvement with the twins separation. Mimi insists that she really saw the other twin dead. Mimi hopes Alondra has a better plan to get them out of this mess. Alondra tells her she has the ace in her hands and she will definitely defeat Lora with it.
51	51	"Minsan Muling Harapin Ang Asawa"	Ruel S. Bayani; Darnel Joy R. Villaflor; Avel E. Sunpongco	Reggie Amigo	33%	May 18, 2011	#1
Alondra makes sure that Remedios won't be able to talk to Jaime. The other rebels are mad at Elena and Krista as they are separated from the rest. They feel they are also traitors. To make matters worse, Ibon lies and says it was Bernabe’s idea to push through with Gen. Sebastiano’s kidnapping. Meanwhile Bernabe tries to find ways on how to get Javier, Elena and Krista out. He visits Javier at the army hospital where he pretends to be a nurse. He tells him to stay put for three days and let his wounds heal. On the other hand, Alondra tries to talk to Remedios and find out herself how they found Javier. Remedios is still sarcastic towards her, not as easy as Alondra thought talking to her would be. Jaime, Joaquin and Alexander arrive at their room and demand an explanation why they have Javier. Jaime says Lora kidnapped Javier as revenge towards him and Alondra.
52	52	"Minsan May Susi Sa Katotohanan"	Ruel S. Bayani; Darnel Joy R. Villaflor; Avel E. Sunpongco	Reggie Amigo	30.6%	May 19, 2011	#2
Alondra and Mimi fear that their secret will be blown after running into Tomas. Elena denies Jaime’s allegations. The general then angrily says they will only solve mystery if Lora and Bernabe are captured. Alondra is very worried about this and coincidentally they run into Bernabe at the parking lot where he was scouting the military headquarters. Mimi asks him what happened to the baby and Lora and Bernabe, who they know as Tomas, say both are dead. Alondra feels he is hiding something and tries to probe him some more. However Bernabe is spotted by Berto and he escapes. Mimi and Alondra soon realize Tomas and Bernabe is one and the same person. Elena and Krista are shunned by the other rebels and Tiago tells Krista to cut her allegiance with the old woman. Krista believes in Elena and Javier’s innocence and chooses to be neutral. Jaime visits Javier at the hospital and the former is angry with the latter’s insolence. Alexander consoles his twin and tells him he will try to talk to Gabrielle and fix things between them.
53	53	"Minsan Kinumbinsing Talikuran Ang Prinsipyo"	Ruel S. Bayani; Darnel Joy R. Villaflor; Avel E. Sunpongco	Reggie Amigo	33%	May 20, 2011	#2
Alexander offers a truce to Javier for the sake of their family. Joaquin questions Alondra and Mimi about Bernabe but both deny they know him. Gabrielle still couldn’t quite forgive both Alexander and Javier. However, the twins reconcile and Javier considers accepting the amnesty being offered to rebels. Remedios and Krista get into a fight with their fellow rebels and the old woman even ends up injured. Krista wants to take advantage of the amnesty being offered to them but Elena refuses to do so. Jaime tries to persuade Remedios but they also end up arguing regarding their relationship. Jaime pretends not to be affected but he still cares for his ex-wife. However, because of Javier, Remedios finally decides to also avail of the amnesty. She is disappointed however when Alondra reveals Javier will be living with them and not with her and Krista.
54	54	"Minsan Maghilom Pa Kaya Ang Kanilang Puso?"	Ruel S. Bayani; Darnel Joy R. Villaflor; Avel E. Sunpongco	Reggie Amigo	32.7%	May 23, 2011	#2
Javier thinks of embracing his new life with his real family. Javier tries to plead with Gabrielle but the girl insists she is in love with Alexander and not with him. Alexander on the other hand talks to Krista and tells her he exchanged places with Javier just to see her. The process for amnesty begins for Ka Elena, Krista and Javier. Krista gets interviewed by Gabrielle and here she insists that her parents were killed by Gen. Marcelo. Krista has another dilemma though, on how to tell her brother Diego that she availed of the government’s amnesty program. Meanwhile Ka Bernabe started working odd jobs to make ends meet. However, some policemen arrest him after matching him with a sketch sent by the military. Guest stars: Nash Aguas as Young Alexander del Tierro and Khaycee Aboloc as Young Krista
55	55	"Minsan Lang Ikulong"	Ruel S. Bayani; Darnel Joy R. Villaflor; Avel E. Sunpongco	Reggie Amigo	33.2%	May 24, 2011	#2
General Sebastiano pieces out the rebels stories about Javier through Tomas' testimony. Joaquin gets news that Bernabe is captured and relays it to Alondra. She and Mimi panics, what if Tomas confesses the truth? Meanwhile, Bernabe is surprised not to find Rosa with Ka Elena and vice versa. They all wonder what has happened to her. He also gets grilled about the twins’ separation but he sticks to his story about a burning apartment. Jaime blames Lora for the incident but Joaquin is quick to defend her side. The rebels learn of Elena, Krista and Javier’s application for amnesty and deem them enemies. Alexander on the other hand gets court marshaled for fraternizing with the enemy. Jaime can’t do anything about it in spite of his position so as not to be called biased.
56	56	"Minsan Hindi Maikukulong ang Galit at Inggit"	Ruel S. Bayani; Darnel Joy R. Villaflor; Avel E. Sunpongco	Reggie Amigo	31.9%	May 25, 2011	#2
Javier and the other rebels discuss the consequences of amnesty. The rebels learn that Xander could be imprisoned after being charged of fraternizing with the enemy. Joaquin tells Jaime he wouldn’t just keep quiet about what’s happening because it has terribly affected his family. He is intent also to find the doctor who helped give birth to the twins, making Alondra fast track her own search. Joaquin also does not believe Bernabe’s story on how he came across Javier. Gen. Marcelo gives Javier, Bernabe, Elena and Krista good news, the president has granted their amnesty and they are now free men.
57	57	"Minsan Tayo'y Magkalayo"	Ruel S. Bayani; Darnel Joy R. Villaflor; Avel E. Sunpongco	Reggie Amigo	33.2%	May 26, 2011	#2
It's time for Alexander to face the jury and prove his innocence. Javier is overjoyed to be able to live with his real family now. Elena will be living with Krista and Bernabe and they are provided with jobs by the government. But they all agree on searching for Rosa first. Krista informs her brother Tiago of her freedom and encourages him to avail of the amnesty. The rebels treat them now as enemies and Ka Diego even vows to kill them if ever they escape from prison. Jaime wants Javier to immediately go back to schooling but he wants to accept the job being offered to him and adjust to living in the city first. Javier also tries befriending Gabrielle again, but she’s still mad at him. Bernabe finds a former colleague who gives him a letter from Rosa and gives it to Elena. Rosa tells them she needs time to think about things so she’s going to live on her own for a while. Elena is very affected and worried about her daughter but Bernabe tells them they should continue with their lives. While moving into their new home, Bernabe is approached by his cousin Mimi.
58	58	"Minsan Pahayag Na Walang Kasalanan"	Ruel S. Bayani; Darnel Joy R. Villaflor; Avel E. Sunpongco	Reggie Amigo	35.6%	May 27, 2011	#2
Alondra freaked out after hearing that Lora left a letter to Remedios. As he enjoys his newfound freedom, Javier learns that his twin is to be placed under court marshal for communicating with them. Alexander explains to the court that all he wanted to do was get to know his long lost brother and has no intention of being a traitor to his sworn duty. The court soon brings out the verdict and Xander was found not guilty of the charges. Mimi brings Tomas to Alondra and he says no harm should come to Lora. Guest stars: Xian Lim as Young Joaquin Del Tierro and Eda Nolan as Young Mimi

=== Season 2 ===
This is the second and final season of the series and consisted of 60 episodes.

No. overall	No. in season	Title	Directed by	Written by	Ratings	Original release date	Nightly Rank
59	1	"Minsan Saksihan Ang Bagong Gulo"	Ruel S. Bayani; Darnel Joy R. Villaflor; Avel E. Sunpongco	Reggie Amigo	33.6%	May 30, 2011	#2
Javier continues to have a hard time adjusting to his new life as part of the elite. Javier invites Tomas, Krista and Remedios to his welcome/birthday party at the mansion. Krista and Alexander have renewed their friendship since the trial. Gabrielle could not help but be jealous towards them and keeps giving Javier the cold shoulder in spite of his attempts to be friends with her. Javier also feels inferior in the midst of his parents’ rich friends. He embarrasses Gen. Sebastiano when he tells some of their guests that he will be postponing his studies and will be working at the Army Hospital as a janitor.
60	2	"Minsan Lumabas Ang Tunay Na Kulay"	Ruel S. Bayani; Darnel Joy R. Villaflor; Avel E. Sunpongco	Reggie Amigo	32.7%	May 31, 2011	#3
Javier has to endure all of the negative hearsays as part of the Sebastian family. Javier is beginning to have a hard time adjusting to city life specially with his grandfather criticizing his every action. And now, every one seems to always compare him with his twin, that Xander is more handsome and intelligent. At the army hospital, he gets into trouble after beating up one of the nurses when he overheard the man call him a monkey for being uneducated. When Jaime learns of this, he immediately reprimands Javier and it seems the young man has had enough for he tells his grandfather he doesn’t care about their wealth or status in the society.
61	3	"Minsan Binalewala"	Ruel S. Bayani; Darnel Joy R. Villaflor; Avel E. Sunpongco	Reggie Amigo	32.6%	June 1, 2011	#3
Remedios grows weary of Javier's recent actions. Javier seeks Remedios and asks if he can stay at their place for a while. Remedios becomes angry at Jaime for treating their grandson that way. Joaquin tries to be reasonable towards Javier but Alondra feels he’s still favoring Xander. Jaime threatens to throw Javier in jail if he continues to create trouble for them. Javier feels more anger towards his family now and more jealous towards his twin.
62	4	"Minsan Nagpanggap Bilang Militar"	Ruel S. Bayani; Darnel Joy R. Villaflor; Avel E. Sunpongco	Reggie Amigo	33.5%	June 2, 2011	#2
Alexander's reputation is in danger because of Javier. Javier uses Alexander’s identity to explore the city and he goes to a bar one night without telling anyone where he is going. He meets a group of girls telling them he’s 2nd Lt. Alexander Del Tierro. In his drunkenness he gets into a fight and he almost gets into trouble again, good thing the other party agreed to let the incident go. However, as he sneaks back inside the house, Jaime almost shoots him, thinking he is a robber trying to get inside the house. Alondra asks her father to give Javier one more chance and she promises to take better care of him. Javier feels Alondra is the only one he can trust in the house. Alondra on the other hand sees her dead son in Javier, that’s why he is closer to her heart than Alexander. Guest stars: Bugoy Cariño as Jaime Del Tierro Jr, Regine Angeles as Pam, Dionne Monsanto as Gem and Franco Daza as Iñigo Rivera Suarez.
63	5	"Minsan Nang Dahil Sa Pag-ibig"	Ruel S. Bayani; Darnel Joy R. Villaflor; Avel E. Sunpongco	Reggie Amigo	37.1%	June 3, 2011	#3
Alexander gets to the bottom of Javier's pretension. Javier has a massive hang over the next day and he has become delinquent at work. Alexander asks Krista about Javier’s life in the mountains and he expresses a big change in his twin since he has come to live with them. The girls Javier met the night before sees Alexander and Krista and they approach him. Krista is shocked when the girl says she has kissed Alexander the night before at a club. Alexander follows Krista home and tells Remedios and Tomas how Javier has been acting lately, including coming home drunk and sneaking out to party. Meanwhile Javier tries to woo Gabrielle at home but Gen. Marcelo kicks him out when he tries to force his granddaughter to come with him to party. Javier goes clubbing again that night and Xander confronts him at the bar, exposing his identity to his date, who calls him a phony. Guest stars: Regine Angeles as Pam and Dionne Monsanto as Gem.
64	6	"Minsan Kunin Mo Na Ang Lahat Sa Akin"	Ruel S. Bayani; Darnel Joy R. Villaflor; Avel E. Sunpongco	Reggie Amigo	25.8%	June 6, 2011	#4
At home, Javier is scolded by both Jaime and Joaquin. But with Alondra siding with him, Javier feels he is not at fault and every one’s just ganging up on him. Krista relates the incident to Tomas and Remedios and when they see him at work, they also give him a lecture on his worsening attitude. Javier becomes angry and shouts at his grandmother. He also breaks a flowerpot making his supervisor fire him from work. He leaves in a huff, even using his parents’ accomplishments to boost his ego. Meanwhile Krista reveals to her brother her relationship with Xander. Diego is against it but Krista says he must learn to accept Xander. She however overhears Xander talking to Gabrielle about Javier. When Gabrielle tells Xander he’s the one she loves and not her brother, Krista approaches them and accuses Gabrielle of trying to steal her boyfriend. Gabrielle tells her though that she has nothing to worry about for it was obvious who Xander is going to choose.
65	7	"Minsan Pamilya Laban Sa Pamilya"	Ruel S. Bayani; Darnel Joy R. Villaflor; Avel E. Sunpongco	Reggie Amigo	27.9%	June 7, 2011	#3
When Jaime learns that Javier was fired from his job he was so angry that he almost disowns his grandson. Javier fights back and even punches his grandfather in the face. Jaime had the police look for Javier and soon he is taken by the police in their custody and placed behind bars. Jaime reiterates he will press charges against Javier so he would learn his lesson. Meanwhile Remedios and Alondra get into a shouting match after the former accuses the latter of being a bad influence on her grandson.
66	8	"Minsan Pinalayas At Nag-bati"	Ruel S. Bayani; Darnel Joy R. Villaflor; Avel E. Sunpongco	Reggie Amigo	24.6%	June 8, 2011	#4
Javier spends the night in jail and gets out on bail the following day. However when they get home, Jaime tells Javier to leave his house. Joaquin decides to leave with the whole family too and Jaime accepts his decision, much to Alondra’s dismay. Javier continues to be jealous towards Alexander and swears he will see his brother’s downfall someday. Gabrielle apologizes to Krista, saying she shouldn’t have said that she loves Xander so bluntly.
67	9	"Minsan Sana'y Nag Sinungaling Nalang"	Ruel S. Bayani; Darnel Joy R. Villaflor; Avel E. Sunpongco	Reggie Amigo	25.5%	June 9, 2011	#4
Alexander mentions to Joaquin about the fight between Alondra and Remedios at the police station, making his father angry. Javier and Alondra tell Alexander to shut up if he has nothing good to say. The twins almost get into a fight and Alondra tells Javier to go out and get some fresh air. Javier leaves in a huff and goes clubbing once again. There he runs into Inigo Suarez, the guy he got into trouble with the previous night. The guy includes him in their activities for the night, which he gladly joins. At a police check point, Inigo races past the authorities to avoid inspection. Javier again lies about his whereabouts when he answers Alondra’s call on his cellphone. Guest stars: Franco Daza as Iñigo Rivera Suarez, Dino Imperial as Rico and Michael Roy Jornales as Bunch.
68	10	"Minsan May Galit Sa Pamilya"	Ruel S. Bayani; Darnel Joy R. Villaflor; Avel E. Sunpongco	Reggie Amigo	26.6%	June 10, 2011	#3
The next day, Javier tells Joaquin he has met new friends at the club. His father tells him to bring his friends home and introduce them to him. Jaime arrives and tells them to return home because of security reasons. But Joaquin gives the condition that Javier comes with them. Jaime and Javier have a man to man talk and Javier pretends to repent for the things he did. He also pretends to be friends with Alexander but he continues to speak badly of his brother behind his back. Meanwhile Diego and Krista fight because she insists for him to avail of the amnesty program. Krista also runs into Gabrielle at the army office and she realizes that they can be good friends as long as ‘Labanos’ doesn’t steal Xander from her.
69	11	"Minsan Masamang Impluwensiya"	Ruel S. Bayani; Darnel Joy R. Villaflor; Avel E. Sunpongco	Reggie Amigo	24%	June 13, 2011	#4
Javier introduces his friends to his family. Joaquin thinks they are okay since they all come from well to do families. Javier also busies himself with his studies and in a few months was able to reach second year high school level. However, Jaime isn’t impressed and he feels Javier is still up to no good. He asks Alexander to look into Javier’s friend’s background. Javier tries to befriend Gabrielle again and he even fools her grandfather with his good behavior. Javier soon discovers that his newfound friends steal cars, paintings and jewelries at whim. They tell him that even though they can afford these things it’s the adrenaline rush that pushes them to do it. Javier eventually agrees to join them in their activities. Guest stars: Franco Daza as Iñigo Rivera Suarez, Dino Imperial as Rico and Michael Roy Jornales as Bunch.
70	12	"Minsan Natutong Magnakaw"	Ruel S. Bayani; Darnel Joy R. Villaflor; Avel E. Sunpongco	Reggie Amigo	24.6%	June 14, 2011	#4
Inigo, Rico and Bunch take Javier to a parking lot to scout a car. Rico finds a vehicle he likes and begins to unlock it, while the rest serve as a look out. A roving guard spots them and shoots at them and in haste, Javier is left behind. Inigo goes back to rescue him but he gets shot in the process. The guard also gets a good look at his plate number. Javier goes to Tomas for help since they can’t take Inigo to the hospital. He lies and says to his uncle that Inigo got shot because of a fight at a club they were at. Tomas is suspicious but takes care of Inigo’s wound. He however tells Alondra to keep Javier out of trouble. Meanwhile the police ask the military for help in solving rampant carnappings in the city. Alexander’s team is asked by the chief of staff to look into this. After talking to the security guard of the parking lot, Alexander discovers that the owner of the car that left the scene of the crime is Javier’s friend Inigo. Guest stars: Franco Daza as Iñigo Rivera Suarez, Dino Imperial as Rico and Michael Roy Jornales as Bunch.
71	13	"Minsan May Pagbabalik Ng Dating Ugali"	Ruel S. Bayani; Darnel Joy R. Villaflor; Avel E. Sunpongco	Reggie Amigo	24.6%	June 15, 2011	#4
Alexander confronts Javier about his new friends and the illegal activities they are involved in. While the twins were arguing, their grandfather over hears them and he immediately suspects that Javier did something bad again. He takes Javier to camp where he will be asked to what extent he participated in the carnappings. Alondra immediately hurries to camp and blames Xander for his brother’s misfortune. Remedios also hears of the news about Javier and she confronts Alondra about raising her grandchild wrong and demands that he should live with them. Guest stars: Franco Daza as Iñigo Rivera Suarez, Dino Imperial as Rico, Michael Roy Jornales as Bunch and Nash Aguas as Young Javier.
72	14	"Minsan Hindi Pakakawalan"	Ruel S. Bayani; Darnel Joy R. Villaflor; Avel E. Sunpongco	Reggie Amigo	26.3%	June 16, 2011	#4
Javier is able to convince everyone of his innocence and mocks Alexander for not being able to embarrass him again. Remedios sees them and stops Javier from his bad behavior. Javier leaves but Tomas stops him to ask if the one he helped the other night was Inigo. He denies this however and warns Inigo about Tomas looking for him. Javier tries to tease Alexander about putting poison in his food after seeing him talking to Gabrielle. Meanwhile Joaquin admits to Alondra that he still has feelings for Lora. Alondra however tells him that he won’t be able to get rid of her and she will be with him until they die. Guest stars: Franco Daza as Iñigo Rivera Suarez, Dino Imperial as Rico, Michael Roy Jornales as Bunch and Nash Aguas as Young Javier.
73	15	"Minsan Planong Siraan"	Ruel S. Bayani; Darnel Joy R. Villaflor; Avel E. Sunpongco	Reggie Amigo	N/A	June 17, 2011	N/A
Javier comforts his mother and tells her she will always have him even if his father leaves them. He also asks permission to go out with his friends again and Alondra gives him consent. Alexander watches him like a hawk at home which results to another shouting match between the twins. Meanwhile Remedios, Krista and Tomas are fired from their jobs without any sufficient reason. Krista considers applying at a call center but Tomas tells her that fluency in English is required for that job. Alondra calls up Tomas that evening and warns him to keep Lora away from her husband Joaquin. Guest stars: Franco Daza as Iñigo Rivera Suarez, Dino Imperial as Rico, and Michael Roy Jornales as Bunch.
74	16	"Minsan Maghihiganti Ang Pusong Sinaktan"	Ruel S. Bayani; Darnel Joy R. Villaflor; Avel E. Sunpongco	Reggie Amigo	24.3%	June 20, 2011	#4
Edgardo informs Jaime that Remedios, Krista and Tomas were fired from their work. He visits Remedios to offer money, but she refuses to accept. After a long day of looking for a job, Krista finds picture of Alexander hugging Gabrielle outside of their house. She furiously takes all of them off while in the vicinity Javier and his friends enjoying the scene. The "Snicker boys" follow Krista and watch as she confronts Alexander and Gabrielle on the intimate pictures. Alexander tries to calmly explain what had happened to Krista but they were interrupted by his angry grandfather Jaime, who is unhappy with the unpleasant scene that he and his guests saw. Remedios consoles heartbroken Krista while Joaquin gives a fatherly advice to his son to go after his heart's wish despite the disapproval of Jaime. Guest stars: Franco Daza as Iñigo Rivera Suarez, Dino Imperial as Rico, Michael Roy Jornales as Bunch and Nash Aguas as Young Javier.
75	17	"Minsan Tuso Ang Kalaban"	Ruel S. Bayani; Darnel Joy R. Villaflor; Avel E. Sunpongco	Reggie Amigo	26.4%	June 21, 2011	#4
Alexander speculates Berto to be the culprit behind the scandalous picture because he is the only one who knew the meeting and has the motive. Berto denies the allegation; he further insists that it was Alexander's fault for destroying Gabrielle's reputation and quiet life. Alexander visits Krista's house but she did not allow him to explain. Javier feels invincible after successful execution of his dark plan against his twin brother. His friends push him to steal a car nearby their neighborhood. Unknowingly, Inigo has a different plan. While Joaquin and Jaime chases after the stolen car, Inigo and his friends show up in the AFP headquarters to create a perfect alibi. After clearing out their names, Inigo instructs Javier to ditch the car. Under the Marikina bridge, Javier leaves the car and successfully escapes the military officers. Alexander tries to locate Javier, who manages to arrive in his room. Guest stars: Franco Daza as Iñigo Rivera Suarez, Dino Imperial as Rico and Michael Roy Jornales as Bunch.
76	18	"Minsan Pinatawad"	Ruel S. Bayani; Darnel Joy R. Villaflor; Avel E. Sunpongco	Reggie Amigo	25.4%	June 22, 2011	#3
Javier, in disguise, successfully escapes from the militars and police officers who were after him after allegedly carnapping a car. Alexander, Gabrielle and Noberto arrives in the crime scene with Xander and Gabby suspecting that Javier may be responsible according to lead and evidences they've found. The family rushed back home and finds Javier who manages to arrive in his room. Jaime orders Alexander to investigate around Javier's room, with no choices left, Xander looks around and unfortunately finds no evidence as Javier immediately disposed all the evidences that can reveal his involvement from the stolen car after Alondra told him that Jaime, Joaquin and Alexander would be arriving home. With this, Javier teases his brother for not being able to embarrass him again. Alondra hopes that Javier isn't doing anything wrong. Alexander visits Krista again to apologise using a group of soldiers, with a letter taped on their backs bearing the words "Mahal Kita" (Lit. "I Love You"), Krista finally accepts his reasons and forgives him. Guest stars: Franco Daza as Iñigo Rivera Suarez, Dino Imperial as Rico, and Michael Roy Jornales as Bunch.
77	19	"Minsan Tumatago Sa Kulungan"	Ruel S. Bayani; Darnel Joy R. Villaflor; Avel E. Sunpongco	Reggie Amigo	23.4%	June 23, 2011	#5
Javier asks Gabrielle out and she obliges, doing it for the sake of Xander. Jaime still insists on Xander that he take Gabrielle to the ball even though he told his grandfather he is taking Krista. Alondra tells him to take back his invitation to Krista for Jaime might embarrass her at the party. Remedios continues to worry about Lora after having a dream about her. What she doesn’t know is that Tomas already knows where Lora is. Lora apparently is in prison and awaiting trial. Guest stars: Franco Daza as Iñigo Rivera Suarez, Dino Imperial as Rico, and Michael Roy Jornales as Bunch.
78	20	"Minsan May Huling Sayaw"	Ruel S. Bayani; Darnel Joy R. Villaflor; Avel E. Sunpongco	Reggie Amigo	24.6%	June 24, 2011	#4
Tomas runs into some relatives of the prisoner rebels and he almost gets hurt. Ka Diego is after revenge and Ibon suggest they take the amnesty given by the government then once they are free, they go after Tomas. Alexander does not tell Krista about his grandfather’s wish to have Gabrielle as his date at the ball. Everyone in his family is tense as they see Xander enter the venue with Krista. Jaime asks Krista to dance and he insults her by saying she will never be accepted by their family. She walks off disappointed once again at Xander. Meanwhile, Inigo plans to steal Jaime’s car the night of the party. Guest stars: Franco Daza as Iñigo Rivera Suarez, Dino Imperial as Rico, and Michael Roy Jornales as Bunch.
79	21	"Minsan Ipaglaban Ang Karapatan Magmahal"	Ruel S. Bayani; Darnel Joy R. Villaflor; Avel E. Sunpongco	Reggie Amigo	27%	June 27, 2011	#4
Jaime gets a report that his vehicle is missing from the parking lot. Alexander and Javier fight for their love the best way they can. Guest stars: Franco Daza as Iñigo Rivera Suarez, Dino Imperial as Rico, and Michael Roy Jornales as Bunch.
80	22	"Minsan Walang Lusot"	Ruel S. Bayani; Darnel Joy R. Villaflor; Avel E. Sunpongco	Reggie Amigo	N/A	June 28, 2011	N/A
How long can Javier keep his involvement in the carnapping incidents from his family? Remedios asks Gen. Marcelo to help her look for Lora. He shares the information to Jaime and urges him to help. He also enlists Joaquin to assist him and Alondra again panics to find Lora first. Javier finally confesses to Alondra his predicament about his new friends and she immediately informs Joaquin about it. However, Jaime overhears them talking and they come up with a plan to entrap Inigo and his gang. Xander pretends to be Javier and the military catches Inigo and the others red handed. Even though Javier is now witness and the key to catching the carnappers, Jaime still doesn’t want him around their family. Xander learns of Berto’s meddling in his business with Javier and Gabrielle. Gabrielle tries to apologize to Javier but he doesn’t accept her sorry. Meanwhile, Alondra meets up with Tomas, knowing he has information on Lora’s whereabouts. Guest stars: Franco Daza as Iñigo Rivera Suarez, Dino Imperial as Rico, and Michael Roy Jornales as Bunch.
81	23	"Minsan May Katotohanan Sa Pagkawala Ng Isang Kapamilya"	Ruel S. Bayani; Darnel Joy R. Villaflor; Avel E. Sunpongco	Reggie Amigo	N/A	June 29, 2011	N/A
Lora's return brings around not just answers but more secrets. Tomas confesses that the day Javier and the other rebels were taken by the military, he was able to follow Lora when she ran away. Tomas took care of her for a while but he had her framed for drug possession so that Remedios or the others won’t be able to find her if she is in prison. However, Lora was freed from her charges and Tomas does not know where to locate her. Meanwhile, Gen. Marcelo also has the information about Lora being in prison. Jaime informs his family about this and Alondra knows she must get to her sister first.
82	24	"Minsan Tumanggi Sa Pag-akit Magpakasal"	Ruel S. Bayani; Darnel Joy R. Villaflor; Avel E. Sunpongco	Reggie Amigo	N/A	June 30, 2011	N/A
Gen. Marcelo informs Remedios that Lora was imprisoned because of drug charges. She doesn’t believe that Lora can have drugs on her and figures she must be set up. She suspects Alondra for doing this and confronts her. Alondra however denies her accusations. Feeling threatened she asks Javier if the time comes which mother will he choose, Lora or her. Javier answers he will choose Alondra. Jaime wants to help Remedios but she refuses to talk to him because of what he did to Krista. Alexander proposes marriage to Krista but she rejects him even though she wanted to say yes
83	25	"Minsan Makita Ang Hindi Dapat Makita"	Ruel S. Bayani; Darnel Joy R. Villaflor; Avel E. Sunpongco	Reggie Amigo	N/A	July 1, 2011	N/A
Jaime goes to Remedios’ house to talk to her. He tells her to forgive Alondra already but Remedios says his other daughter has done much to hurt Lora. Meanwhile, Krista happily reports that her brother and the other rebels are finally seeking amnesty. However, Tomas warns them that their former comrades are doing this so as to take revenge on them. Ka Tiago asks Ka Diego to let his sister off the hook and the rebel leader agrees only if she takes part in killing Javier, Lora, Tomas and Remedios. Javier talks to Gabrielle and she promises to be good friends with him if he indeed turns over a new leaf. Alondra waits for Javier at the AFP office and here she catches sight of Lora, watching her from afar.
84	26	"Minsan Wala Ng Takas Sa Mga Pagbabago"	Ruel S. Bayani; Darnel Joy R. Villaflor; Avel E. Sunpongco	Reggie Amigo	25.2%	July 4, 2011	#4
Lora also sees Alondra and she starts walking away. Coincidentally Joaquin and Alexander were on their way back to camp and manage to corner Lora. Soon she is arrested and taken into military custody. Alondra panics and asks Mimi to come to the army office. She also calls Tomas who’s currently waiting to see Lora. Alondra tells him to do something about Lora. Joaquin is obviously affected by Lora’s presence and Alondra could not help but notice his concern for her. Lora is happy to be able to see her family again but she is shocked when she learns that Javier and his twin are the children of Joaquin and Alondra.
85	27	"Minsan Mahirap Paniwalaan"	Ruel S. Bayani; Darnel Joy R. Villaflor; Avel E. Sunpongco	Reggie Amigo	24.1%	July 5, 2011	#4
Lora is suspicious how all that has happened can be coincidental. Tomas remains silent while Remedios tries to put Lora at ease. Alondra enters the holding room and offers a truce to her sister but Lora says she’s just being a hypocrite. Javier asks permission to visit Lora often and Alondra gives in. However, she is still hatching a plan on how to cover up what she and Tomas did in the past. She asks Joaquin to get closure on his and Lora’s former relationship and he obliges. Jaime on the other hand visits Lora while she’s sleeping and could not help but feel sad.
86	28	"Minsan Muling Harapin Ang Dating Mahal"	Ruel S. Bayani; Darnel Joy R. Villaflor; Avel E. Sunpongco	Reggie Amigo	25.6%	July 6, 2011	#4
Lora and Joaquin talk about their past relationship and finally put behind their misgivings on one another. Alondra is scared still if Joaquin discovers the things she did and hopes Tomas is doing his job on Lora. Lora learns that Remedios received a call and letter that’s supposedly from her. She denies trying to communicate with her family and becomes suspicious of Tomas. Tomas however denies everything but his conscience is slowly eating him up. He call Mimi and she warns him not tell Alondra of how he feels about their plan.
87	29	"Minsan Lang Mayakap Ang Anak"	Ruel S. Bayani; Darnel Joy R. Villaflor; Avel E. Sunpongco	Reggie Amigo	26.6%	July 7, 2011	#4
Lora discovers that Jaime is blaming her that Javier grew up away from his family. She is hurt with her father’s accusation and she refuses to reconcile with him. Lora also meets Alexander formally and they immediately got a liking for one another. However, she is disappointed when she learns about Javier’s problems and demands from him an explanation. Javier becomes angry thinking that it was Alexander who told on him, and tries to punch his brother.
88	30	"Minsan Siniraan Ang Tunay Na Ina"	Ruel S. Bayani; Darnel Joy R. Villaflor; Avel E. Sunpongco	Reggie Amigo	25.1%	July 8, 2011	#4
Lora tells Javier that she learned the things he has done from Remedios and not from his brother. She blames Alondra for spoiling Javier and tells him she wants to talk to his mother. Alondra pretends to be the victim in their argument and tells her husband that she is scared with what Lora can do to her. She also voices this out to Jaime, who has second thoughts about Lora’s amnesty request. Alexander defends his aunt though and says it is Jaime who should know that Lora is a good person. Tomas asks Lora if she will leave him once her amnesty is granted. Lora tells him he is one of the few people she trusts and that she will stay by his side.
89	31	"Minsan May Kutob Na Nanganganib Ang Buhay"	Ruel S. Bayani; Darnel Joy R. Villaflor; Avel E. Sunpongco	Reggie Amigo	23.7%	July 11, 2011	#4
Javier is problematic for he can’t choose between Lora and Alondra and it’s affecting his studies. Krista on the other hand, reports that her brother and their former comrades have submitted their applications for amnesty. Lora is wary about this especially when it comes to Ka Diego and feels the other rebels are out to harm them. Despite Alondra’s pleas that Lora is going to harm her, Jaime signs Lora’s amnesty papers. Alexander continues to woo Krista and it looks like she’s going to give in. Guest stars: Nash Aguas as Young Javier
90	32	"Minsan Hagkan Ang Kalayaan"	Ruel S. Bayani; Darnel Joy R. Villaflor; Avel E. Sunpongco	Reggie Amigo	23.9%	July 12, 2011	#4
Krista finally reconciles with Alexander and introduces him to her brother. Tiago is still wary of Xander and was very sarcastic towards him when he asked for her hand in marriage. Lora and the other rebels’ amnesty papers are processed and everyone was released in less than a month. However, in spite of Tomas’ offering of peace towards Diego, Ibon and Tiago, they continue to plot the downfall of their ex-comrades. Meanwhile, Javier is very happy with the release of Lora and stays at their home to celebrate. Alondra is jealous and tries to make Javier come home that evening. Javier though wants to sleep over at Remedios’ and catch on things with his aunt and Alondra could not even say anything else after Javier cuts off their phone conversation.
91	33	"Minsan Unting Lumalapit Sa Tunay Na Ina"	Ruel S. Bayani; Darnel Joy R. Villaflor; Avel E. Sunpongco	Reggie Amigo	23.6%	July 13, 2011	#4
The next day, Alondra appears at Remedios’ home very early to take Javier home. Javier tries to protest but Lora cuts into their conversation and ends up fighting with Alondra. Alondra slaps Lora and Tomas tried his hardest to stop Lora from also harming Alondra. After learning of the incident, Joaquin apologizes to Lora on behalf of his wife but she refuses to talk to him. Tomas talks to Alondra and warns her if she ever hurts Lora again, he will reveal their secrets. Alexander visits Lora at the army hospital, where she is now working. Lora could not help but feel close to him. When Remedios visits her too that day, she shares that she already likes Xander. Javier overhears their conversation and feels jealous. He confronts Xander about stealing the attention of the people close to him. Ibon, Tiago and Diego meanwhile are observing the former rebels’ routines and they plan to detonate a bomb at one place to finish them all off in one blow.
92	34	"Minsan Ay Magpakailaman Sa Pagseselos"	Ruel S. Bayani; Darnel Joy R. Villaflor; Avel E. Sunpongco	Reggie Amigo	23.5%	July 14, 2011	#4
Javier comes home and talks to Alondra about Lora and Xander. Alondra pretends to be asleep and Javier goes out to drink by himself. He gets drunk and goes over to Remedios’ house where he insults Lora, she can’t help but slap him in the face. Lora feels she has to save Javier from Alondra for he has completely changed. Alondra meanwhile uses this incident to brainwash Javier from being too close to Lora. She also tries to detach herself emotionally from Javier. Meanwhile the rebels continue to plan their move on killing Javier, Lora, Remedios and Tomas. They recruit other rebels to do the job and finish off everyone specially Javier, who caused the breakdown of their group.
93	35	"Minsan Sumang-ayon Magpakasal"	Ruel S. Bayani; Darnel Joy R. Villaflor; Avel E. Sunpongco	Reggie Amigo	24.3%	July 15, 2011	#4
Alexander makes sure that Krista's family will allow them to get married. Lora gets visited by Tomas, Krista and Remedios during her lunch break and surprise her with food. She is worried about Javier and asks them if he has made contact to any of them. Alexander also drops by to eat with them and again proposes to Krista in front of her ‘family’. Krista is ecstatic and says yes this time. Javier tries to talk to Gabrielle but she’s out of the office doing field work and instead he gets to ask Berto about his last conversation with his friend. Berto confesses that Gabrielle revealed to him that she still loves Xander and only sees Javier as a friend. Lora goes to her old home to talk to Javier. She pleads to him to come with her but Alondra cuts in their conversation. Lora says she is willing to do anything just so Alondra allows Javier to go with her. Alondra asks her to kneel and beg and when Lora does, she tells her that it’s actually up to her son if he wants to go or not. Javier chooses Alondra in the end and Lora is devastated. Jaime is against Alexander and Krista’s engagement but Joaquin pushes through with the pamamanhikan. When Tiago learns of this he tells Diego that his sister will marry Xander and the rebel leader thinks this is the right time to execute their plan.
94	36	"Minsan Mamanhikan"	Ruel S. Bayani; Darnel Joy R. Villaflor; Avel E. Sunpongco	Reggie Amigo	25.3%	July 18, 2011	#4
Everyone is on their toes as a love filled-day turned into tragedy. The pamamanhikan (Lit. when the man and his family visits the woman's family. It is also at this time that the wedding date is formally set, and the couple become engaged to get married) pushes through and Krista is very happy that even her brother is in attendance. However, Lora and Alondra have an exchange of heated words as Joaquin and Alexander were still looking for a spot to park the car. Lora tries to talk to Javier again but he continues to reject her as she doesn’t want to change her mind that he has become a bad person and needs reform. Alexander and Javier fight about this and the former says he has had enough of the latter’s attitude. Meanwhile Tiago tries hard to get his sister out of the house and pretends he has a stomach ache. Diego and Ibon wait in the adjacent apartment so they can start killing the former rebels. Jaime changes his mind about attending the pamamanhikan and catches sight of Tiago and Krista leaving the house as he arrives.
95	37	"Minsan May Trahedyang Wawasak Ng Mga Puso"	Ruel S. Bayani; Darnel Joy R. Villaflor; Avel E. Sunpongco	Reggie Amigo	26.4%	July 19, 2011	#4
Remedios and Lora fight for their lives after being attacked. Thinking the pamamanhikan was finished, Gen. Sebastiano asks his driver to turn around. However they hear gunshots so Jaime goes back. Krista and Tiago also halt in their tracks and the latter tries to take the former away from the scene. Krista insists however on going back. Inside the house, Lora was telling Javier not to look for their family anymore once they move away, when the gunshots were fired. Javier was the first target but Remedios moved in front of the window and she receives the shot intended for her grandson. Lora was also hit on her hip. Every one was down on the floor including Alondra and when the gunshots stop, Joaquin and Alexander instantly chased after the masked men from next door but they managed to escape. Remedios and Lora were brought to the hospital and Jaime learns that his ex-wife’s life is in critical condition. He breaks down in front of Lora and tells her he will do everything he can to save her mother’s life.
96	38	"Minsan Tanging Anak Lang Ang Hinihintay Para Mabuhay"	Darnel Joy R. Villaflor; Avel E. Sunpongco	Reggie Amigo	26.7%	July 20, 2011	#4
Javier feels that he is the cause of Remedios and Lora's mishap. Alondra asks her father if she has to move out of the house should he reconcile with Remedios. Jaime tells her not to do anything drastic for they will fix things as soon as Remedios gets well. Tomas, Kate and Javier talk to the rebels about their whereabouts that morning but Diego and Ibon deny they were anywhere near the shooting. Xander however tells Joaquin that Javier is the target of the shooting and Inigo’s group, who has gotten out on bail, could be the possible suspects. He also adds Ka Diego and Ibon on the suspect list for they also have a grudge on Javier for allegedly betraying their group. Meanwhile Javier tries to ask the unconscious Remedios for forgiveness. His grandmother flat lines but the doctors were able to stabilize her condition. Lora also pays her mother a visit and prays hard for Remedios’ recovery.
97	39	"Minsan Makulong Sa Pag Gustong Tumulong"	Darnel Joy R. Villaflor; Avel E. Sunpongco	Reggie Amigo	26.4%	July 21, 2011	#4
Diego and his comrades decided to help with Remedios' case to cover their tracks. The rebels drop by the camp for questioning. Joaquin asks them to submit to a paraffin test. Javier angrily goes over to Inigo’s home and punches him. Xander stops his brother from further causing damage but Iñigo says Javier will pay for what he’s done. Gen. Marcelo visits Remedios inside the ICU and tells her that he shouldn’t have introduced her to Jaime. He also says he should have just chosen to love him. Jaime overhears this and says to Gen. Marcelo maybe Remedios could have been spared the hurt if she chose his friend. But Gen. Marcelo says he didn’t dare confess his feelings for he valued their friendship and besides Remedios loved Jaime and not him. Jaime is thankful and promises to make amends with his wife when she wakes up. Iñigo files assault charges against Javier and Jaime tells Alondra not to contact a lawyer for her son to learn his lesson. Guest stars: Franco Daza as Iñigo Rivera Suarez
98	40	"Minsan Kailangan Pakawalan"	Darnel Joy R. Villaflor; Avel E. Sunpongco	Reggie Amigo	27.7%	July 22, 2011	#4
Tears flow and emotions soar for Remedios. While Lora, Tomas and Krista were visiting Remedios in the ICU, she flat lines again. Though the doctors manage to stabilize her condition, they tell the family that only the machines are keeping Remedios alive. Lora doesn’t want to let go of her mother but Jaime tells his daughter that her mother is in pain and it would be best for her to rest. Father and daughter reconcile and come to a decision to not have Remedios revived should she flat line again. Every one says their good-byes and Gen. Sebastiano professes his love for his wife, saying he has never stopped loving her.
99	41	"Minsan Lang May Mamatay"	Darnel Joy R. Villaflor; Avel E. Sunpongco	Reggie Amigo	24.9%	July 25, 2011	#4
Javier dreams of his grandmother and he apologizes to her for all the things he has done wrong. He wakes up with a start and rashly asks to be let out of jail to see her. Remedios flat lines again and passes away. Soon, preparations for her funeral are made. Xander warns Javier not to do anything reckless and he says he feels like being in prison with all the rules they are imposing. Joaquin tells Javier to shape up and he says he will try his best. At the funeral, Alondra tries to make peace with Lora but the latter knows this is just for show. Alondra then suggests to their father to ask Lora to live with them to show how sincere she is with reconciling with her sister.
100	42	"Minsan Manirahan Sa Dating Bahay"	Darnel Joy R. Villaflor; Avel E. Sunpongco	Reggie Amigo	23.2%	July 26, 2011	#6
Gen. Sebastiano asks Lora to move in their home again. She is hesitant and Jaime extends the invitation to Krista and Tomas. Jaime apologizes to Krista for what he has said to her before and welcomes her to their family. Meanwhile Javier gets into another fight with Iñigo when the latter taunts him about killing his grandmother. Iñigo pushes through with his assault case and Alondra had to get Javier out on bail. Javier could not stop feeling guilty about Lora and he escapes from the on duty guards at home, steals one of his family’s vehicles and goes to his aunt’s home. Tiago and Krista were discussing where they should live when Javier arrives. Tiago calls for Diego and Ibon to attack the house again.
101	43	"Minsan Walang Tatakas Sa Paghihiganti"	Darnel Joy R. Villaflor; Avel E. Sunpongco	Reggie Amigo	22.2%	July 27, 2011	#7
Javier escapes from the police taking him to prison. Before he escaped he figured out a lot of things against his family thinking that nobody understands him. Meanwhile Lora moves back to the Del Tierro mansion with Tomas and is given a warm welcome and later finds out that Javier has escaped making Jaime even more furious and suspecting that he is in fact guilty. Changing the topic, Jaime tells Lora to join in and help Alondra with their family business in the jewelry store but refuses to giving it to Alondra all for herself. The soldiers informs the family that Javier has been found near their house and Alexander is ordered to run after him. Alexander finally catches Javier alone with no way out. Javier smacks Alexander making his brother fall unconscious.
102	44	"Minsan Sagupaan Ng Mga Puso"	Darnel Joy R. Villaflor; Avel E. Sunpongco	Reggie Amigo	25.7%	July 28, 2011	#4
Javier calls Alondra after what happened. Xander reports to the office with a head wound and says his brother escaped after hitting him with a pipe. Lora and Alondra get into another fight in front of their father and husbands. Alondra calls Lora a kidnapper and Tomas immediately comes to her rescue, insinuating that they can have the case investigated to find out the truth. Alondra backs off but she is jealous of how her father is giving Lora special treatment. Krista invites Xander to see her new house but he seems to be cold towards her, saying his wound hurts. He however finds the time to talk to Gabrielle, making Krista ballistic. Gabrielle says she is only friends with Xander but Berto tells her Krista is still going to be jealous because she knows how Gabrielle loves her boyfriend. Alondra gets into another fight with Lora when she drops Remedios’ picture frame on the floor.
103	45	"Minsan May Impostor"	Darnel Joy R. Villaflor; Avel E. Sunpongco	Reggie Amigo	24%	July 29, 2011	#4
Jaime tries to reconcile his two daughters but Lora still refuses to apologize to Alondra. Alondra talks to Tomas about Lora’s attitude but Tomas warns her instead to stop threatening his wife. Joaquin and Lora often bump into each other inside the mansion, making Tomas more jealous. Xander continues to get closer to Gabrielle, confusing her with what he’s doing. He even asks her out to dinner. However, it is later revealed that Alondra ordered Javier to switch places with Alexander and they are keeping him captive in an old warehouse.
104	46	"Minsan Walang Kapalit"	Darnel Joy R. Villaflor; Avel E. Sunpongco	Reggie Amigo	24.3%	August 1, 2011	#5
Javier continues with his act of being Xander and Krista notices he’s getting colder towards her while he’s getting closer to Gabrielle. Javier asks Krista for a cool off but instead of agreeing she angrily breaks their engagement off. Javier pretends to seek comfort in Gabrielle and he asks her out to drink at a club. After getting drunk, Gabrielle takes Javier home where he kisses her and she doesn’t stop him from doing so. Alondra catches them and soon even her grandfather knows about the incident. Krista is called over to the mansion and here she also tells everyone that the wedding won’t be pushing through. Meanwhile, Tomas confronts Joaquin about his closeness towards Lora and when she learns about this, she becomes angry at her husband for not trusting her.
105	47	"Minsan Dahil May Isang Ikaw"	Darnel Joy R. Villaflor; Avel E. Sunpongco	Reggie Amigo	26.7%	August 2, 2011	#4
Krista is devastated and makes her way home to her brother. Tiago says she should have listened to him long before and he makes plans for them to move. Javier makes Xander an iron mask so as no one will recognize his brother if he escapes. Alondra encourages Javier further and says Gabrielle will definitely forgive him because she loves him. However, Gabrielle is also shattered because she not only hurt herself but the other people close to her. Berto is very much disappointed with what happened and he emphasizes that her love for the wrong man has blinded her. She asks for a leave of absence from her grandfather and he gives her his medal of valor to give her courage to always do what is right.
106	48	"Minsan Pinaghinalaan"	Darnel Joy R. Villaflor; Avel E. Sunpongco	Reggie Amigo	26.8%	August 3, 2011	#4
Javier is disappointed when he discovers Gabrielle is taking leave from work. He confesses to her that he’s the one he truly loves and not Krista. Gabrielle could not help but say he sounds very much like his twin brother Javier. Javier realizes his mistake and calls up his mother. Tomas overhears Alondra say ‘Javier’ and when he confronts her she only says it’s a worker at their store. Mimi arrives and was forced to back up the information. She is mad however when she learns what Alondra did to Alexander for she doesn’t want to have anything more to do with her plans. Alondra asks Mimi to pretend not to know the secret in front of Javier and takes her along on their little field trip to the hide out. Tomas, who was still suspicious, hides in the back to the vehicle. Gabrielle, who was also suspecting something wrong, saw Tomas alight the vehicle secretly as she was observing the car Javier was driving a few meters away.
107	49	"Minsan Sana Maulit Muli"	Darnel Joy R. Villaflor; Avel E. Sunpongco	Reggie Amigo	29.7%	August 4, 2011	#2
Berto misses Gabrielle’s first phone call to him so he calls her back. Gabrielle explains she’s following Alexander because she finds something odd about him but she’s surprised to see Tomas instead. Before she can say where she is, her phone battery dies. Mimi tells Alondra she will just wait by the car and Gabrielle was also taken aback to find her there. She borrows Mimi’s cell phone to call for back up and Mimi panics and hits her with an ax she sees lying on the ground. Tomas sees all this and comes up to his cousin. Mimi is surprised and asks Tomas to help her. Tomas just tells her not to mention anything about him being there to Alondra and disappears. Tomas is bothered with his conscience about all the secrets and things he has donefor Alondra. He goes back but he sees that Gabrielle was able to crawl towards Alexander’s cage before she passed out. Xander was furiously calling out his twin’s name. Mimi eventually tells Alondra what she has done and Tomas arrives with no good news to share. Berto reports Gabrielle’s call to Joaquin and soon Tomas was called out to the command post. He denies seeing Gabrielle.
108	50	"Minsan Saan Ka Man Naroroon"	Darnel Joy R. Villaflor; Avel E. Sunpongco	Reggie Amigo	27.8%	August 5, 2011	#3
Tomas is set free because there are no other evidences besides Gabrielle’s call to hold him in custody. Mimi returns to Xander’s cell and takes Gabrielle’s body with her. Xander is very angry and kept calling her Javier. She buries her body, crying steadily as she covered up the hole in the ground. She tells Alondra she doesn’t want anything more to do with her evil plans. Xander is able to free himself from his chains and mask. He pretends though to be still locked up when Javier checks up on him. He angrily tells his twin Gabrielle died right in front of his cell. Javier asks his mother about it but Alondra denies any knowledge of this. Lora complains of pain in her abdomen area and Gen. Sebastiano insists on making an appointment to the doctor for her. Tomas becomes more anxious about the secrets he harbors.
109	51	"Minsan May Bukas Pa"	Darnel Joy R. Villaflor; Avel E. Sunpongco	Reggie Amigo	29.2%	August 8, 2011	#1
Berto reports on Tomas’ background which he traces back to an orphanage. He also finds out Tomas has a cousin, a certain Miranda, who was adopted before him. Javier goes back to Xander’s cell to demand what he knows about Gabrielle. Xander however manages to knock Javier out and tie him up. He claims his life again and sets out to find Gabrielle’s killer. News that Gabrielle’s car is found and Gen. Marcelo immediately goes to the crime scene to investigate. However, the police say everything seems to be wiped clean as Gabrielle’s prints weren’t visible. They are now alarmed that something bad happened to her. Mimi calls Tomas and tells him she can’t take the secrets anymore. She did what she can to protect herself and that she has no intention of surrendering to the police. Javier dreams of Gabrielle like the time when Remedios died. Gabrielle tells him to change to the old Javier and that he should have been more resilient in proving his innocence than running away.
110	52	"Minsan Basta't Tayong Dalawa"	Darnel Joy R. Villaflor; Avel E. Sunpongco	Reggie Amigo	30%	August 9, 2011	#2
Alexander knows they wouldn’t find Gabrielle and he is distraught over it. Berto relates to Alexander what happened during his absence and how Gabrielle even asked Krista for forgiveness. Xander immediately goes to Krista’s home and he tries to explain. However she refuses to talk to him. Alexander was persistent and follows her on the bus to the province. She eventually gives in and everything became clear to her why Xander was very different. The two are reconciled but Xander asks Krista to keep the truth a secret for he wants to know who is behind this plan. His fears are confirmed when his mom suddenly became very attentive towards him and calls him Javier. Lora meantime has to undergo several tests because her initial check up revealed that she still has her reproductive organs, contrary to what Tomas said to her years ago. Tomas is nervous and is discouraging Lora from taking the tests.
111	53	"Minsan Oras Nang Pagbayaran Ang Mga Kasalanan"	Darnel Joy R. Villaflor; Avel E. Sunpongco	Reggie Amigo	29.7%	August 10, 2011	#2
Xander goes to Javier and asks him if Alondra is involved with what happened to him and Gabrielle. Javier continues to take his mother’s side and refuses to cooperate. Xander asks Berto if there could be any connection between Tomas and his mother besides Lora but his friend says they are still awaiting the results of a court order regarding an adoption. Tomas calls up Mimi and says Lora is undergoing tests regarding her condition. Mimi’s fears return and she tells her cousin that she’s going into hiding. When Alondra discovers Mimi missing, she takes Tomas’ watch from his room and tells him to make sure his cousin does not reveal anything or else he will be blamed for Gabrielle’s death. Lora finally learns of her test results and she is shocked to know that she has actually given birth. She knows Tomas has kept a big secret from her and demands from him where her child is.
112	54	"Minsan Mahanap Ang Katawan"	Darnel Joy R. Villaflor; Avel E. Sunpongco	Reggie Amigo	30%	August 11, 2011	#1
Tomas could not explain to Lora where her child is and she goes to her father to tell him what happened. Tomas tells Alondra that Lora now knows the truth. She tells him to follow all her orders for he is still the prime suspect in Gabrielle’s death. Alexander and Joaquin soon learn of Lora’s predicament and promises to help Lora look for her child. Jaime gets an anonymous tip on the location of Gabrielle’s body. It was actually from Alondra, who has placed Tomas’ watch at the scene of the crime. Gen. Marcelo is devastated and is intent on putting Tomas in jail. Tomas tries to talk to Joaquin at the army base but instead he sees Lora bumping into a rebel informer, the same man who he ordered to bring food to Lora while she was in prison. Lora was still in shock with all the information she learned about Tomas when Alondra steps in their father’s office. Alexander, Joaquin, Jaime and Gen. Marcelo return from the field and shows to Lora Tomas’s watch. She’s bewildered at all the things he has done, more so with his connection to Gabrielle’s death. Xander reports to the generals the progress of the investigation and Alondra realizes the real Xander is back.
113	55	"Minsan Umiyak Ang Puso"	Darnel Joy R. Villaflor; Avel E. Sunpongco	Reggie Amigo	31.1%	August 12, 2011	#1
Alondra realizes her mistake and she goes to Javier’s cell and frees him. She also tells him that Gabrielle’s dead and Tomas is the man behind her killing. Alexander returns to his twin’s prison with Krista but discovers someone has set him free. Gabrielle is laid to rest and Krista makes peace with Gen. Marcelo. Tomas goes to the funeral secretly and coincidentally Javier also had the same idea. He beats up Tomas but they both run when the police sees them. Alexander finally confesses to his father, grandfather and Gen. Marcelo what he knows about the shooting which was orchestrated by the rebels. Krista says what he is saying is true for she was also there when they heard her brother talking to Ka Diego and Ibon. Alexander also adds that Javier pretended to be him and kept him a captive. He also tells them he suspects his mother in assisting his twin.
114	56	"Minsan Mabunyag Ang Buong Katotohanan"	Darnel Joy R. Villaflor; Avel E. Sunpongco	Reggie Amigo	32.9%	August 15, 2011	#1
Alondra steps in and denies Alexander’s allegations. She leaves and tells Javier that everyone is ganging up on her. However, Alexander eventually reveals that Mimi, his mother’s best friend, is Tomas’ first cousin, further connecting Alondra to the mysterious activities. Alexander now is suspicious if Alondra is indeed his real mother and Jaime allows another DNA testing without Lora’s knowledge. It is soon revealed that Alexander and Javier are Lora’s sons and not Alondra’s. Alexander finally understood why Alondra has been cold to him all his life. Joaquin and Jaime reveal the truth to Lora, who was speechless upon hearing the truth.
115	57	"Minsan Lang Kita Inibig"	Darnel Joy R. Villaflor; Avel E. Sunpongco	Reggie Amigo	N/A	August 16, 2011	N/A
Lora embraces Alexander upon seeing him. She could not believe that all this is happening. Meanwhile Tomas threatens to kill Alondra but she manages to have the authorities capture him. However when she came home, the truth exposes itself and she could not cover everything with lies anymore. Jaime would not even speak to her. Joaquin decides to get an annulment. And Lora tells her that she’s taking everything back, her sons, her wealth and her place in the family. Gen. Marcelo wants Tomas to admit to killing Gabrielle, but he confesses that it is Mimi who’s responsible for her death. He also tells Lora the truth, how Alondra’s taxi hit Lora and Mimi’s call to him for help. He took Lora to a hospital, where they also discovered that she was pregnant. While she was in a coma, Tomas took care of her and eventually fell in love with her. When she gave birth, Alondra took one of the twins, thinking the other baby is dead. Miraculously it breathe again and Tomas took Javier and Lora to the mountains. Still Lora could not believe what he had done and he let Alondra hurt her and her family. Alondra goes to Javier’s hideout and tells him more lies about Alexander. She asks Javier to kill his brother, who is destroying their reputation and family.
116	58	"Minsan Sagupaan Hanggang Katapusan"	Darnel Joy R. Villaflor; Avel E. Sunpongco	Reggie Amigo	33.9%	August 17, 2011	#1
Ibon notifies his brother that Tiago has been captured by the militars and suggests that they should go back to the mountains to which Diego disagrees to and that they must stick to their plan to kill Javier and his family. Tomas meanwhile tries to convince Edgardo that he didn't kill his granddaughter but Mimi but refuses to believe so. After hearing the news that his cousin will be sent to jail for allegedly murdering Gabrielle, Mimi returns and sacrifices herself to the AFP revealing the truth that she in fact stabbed Gabrielle and is afraid of Alondra and begs on her knees for forgiveness. On the other hand, Alondra visits Javier and tells him that Lora and Joaquin is ruining their family and that they have hurt her for supposedly blaming her for Gabrielle's death. Javier promises her that he would protect her no matter what, and to do this they need armoury. Javier goes to Inigo's house and overhears them insulting him, he sneaks in their house and takes a bag of guns and tips the police of their business, locking them back behind bars. Tomas escapes from prison and falls in the hands of the rebels. Alondra also kidnaps Lora and ties her up at the same cage where they hid Alexander then and lies to Javier that she has captured Alexander by changing Lora's clothes, while she was unconscious to Alexander's military uniform so that he could shoot her, blaming Alexander for their family to fall apart. Lora later opens her eyes after hearing Alondra's plan. Guest stars: Franco Daza as Iñigo Rivera Suarez, Dino Imperial as Rico and Michael Roy Jornales as Bunch
117	59	"Minsan Sumuko"	Darnel Joy R. Villaflor; Avel E. Sunpongco	Reggie Amigo	35.9%	August 18, 2011	#1
Lora gets a chance to escape from Alondra and in a reverse of events, Lora ties her sister up and also in Alexander's military uniform. Lora runs off after covering Alondra's mouth and face as Javier arrived and shoots Alondra in the arm. Alexander finds Javier as he discovers that he indeed has shot Alondra mistakenly. Alondra tells Javier to escape before its too late as Alexander calls for back up. Meanwhile Lora hears gunshots and finds that Diego, Ibon and their army of rebels has Tomas. Lora immediately runs off and but unfortunately faces Diego, Tomas witnesses Lora's situation and immediately saves her risking his life finding out that he has been shot. Lora tells him to fight for his life while Tomas tries to ask for forgiveness. Diego finds them and Tomas quickly tells Lora to escape leaving him alone with Diego and was continuously shot to death. Javier runs away from Alexander frightened that he'd go to prison. On the other hand, Alondra covers her wound and finds a gun yearning for revenge. Alexander later tries to convince Javier to surrender leading to their final showdown where they aim their guns at each other. Lora and Joaquin finally gets hold of Javier and reveals the truth and offers truce to his brother but runs off.
118	60	"Minsan May Walang Hanggan"	Darnel Joy R. Villaflor; Avel E. Sunpongco	Reggie Amigo	39.1%	August 19, 2011	#1
Javier faces Alondra who points the gun at him after witnessing that he has found out the truth and is furious that she, of all people lied to him for which he calls her a demon. He comes back to his family and asks for forgiveness to his father, his mother but mainly his brother and grandfather and promises to change. He is also proven not guilty of the accusations of possession of drugs and illegal armoury thus meaning that he will not got to jail. Meanwhile Alondra falls in the hands of the rebels and ties her up with explosives and uses her to get hold of Javier and Lora. Lora and Javier agrees to help her despite all her wrongdoings which surprises Alondra. As they arrive in the building, the rebels points the guns at them and finds out that Alexander is pretending to be Javier. Javier and Krista charges in the building to help them, Lora meanwhile tries to save her sister. Alondra, confused asks her why she is helping her and reveals that, despite all her wrongdoings, she is still family. The militars also charges in the building to help but fails to defuse the bombs around Alondra. Alondra immediately asks for forgiveness to her family and begs them to leave before it explodes. The brothers, Javier and Alexander, after shooting most of the rebels tries to save Alondra but yet still fails to. Diego takes his revenge on Javier and shoots him bringing his life in danger. Alondra begs Alexander to save his brother. Alexander runs off to save his brother as Alondra asks for forgiveness to God. Jaime Jr. visits her spiritually and asks her to come home with him to heaven as the bombs explode. In a matter of life and death, Javier tells his brother to save himself. A year later, Joaquin and Lora and Alexander and Krista are seen celebrating a combined wedding revealing that Javier is in fact alive. Gen. Jaime has also retired from service and has passed on his seat to Edgardo and Alexander and Krista are happy parents of twin brothers fulfilling the dream of a complete family. Guest stars: Bugoy Cariño as Jaime Del Tierro Jr and Gary Valenciano as himself.

== Webisodes ==
On the official website of Minsan Lang Kita Iibigin, a series of previously unreleased footage were posted.

No.	Webisode title	Directed by	Written by	Date uploaded
1	"Minsan May Dalawang Kapatid"	Ruel Santos Bayani	Reggie Amigo	April 18, 2011
This is a story of Young Alondra (Kim Chiu) in her struggle as an illegitimate daughter of Jaime (Albert Martinez) and how she gets involved in Lora's (Erich Gonzales) relationship with Joaquin (Xian Lim). Starring: Albert Martinez as Young Jaime, John Estrada as Joaquin, Xian Lim as Young Joaquin, Amy Austria-Ventura as Lora, Erich Gonzales as Young Lora, Lorna Tolentino as Alondra and Kim Chiu as Young Alondra.
2	"Minsan May Bangungot"	Avel E. Sunpongco	Mariami Tanangco-Domingo	June 6, 2011
Young Alexander (Nash Aguas) is having nightmares about himself, but isn't him perhaps Young Javier (Nash Aguas) being beaten and tortured. Starring: Nash Aguas as Young Javier and Alexander, Lorna Tolentino as Alondra, Chiqui Del Carmen as Yaya, Therese Carlos, Arnel Carreon, Boots Anson-Roa as Ka Elena (uncredited), Ronnie Lazaro as Ka Diego (uncredited) and Coco Martin as Javier (uncredited).
3	"Minsan May Dalawang Bayani"	Avel E. Sunpongco	Mariami Tanangco-Domingo	June 10, 2011
This is a story of Young Gabrielle (Mika dela Cruz) as she copes with her parents tragic death when she just turned 10 years old. Edgardo (Dante Rivero), her grandfather adopts her and she decides to follow her family's footstep to becoming a soldier, and indeed fulfills her promise. Starring: Mika dela Cruz as Young Gabrielle, Dante Rivero as Edgardo, Chiqui Del Carmen as Yaya, Therese Carlos, Arnel Carreon, and Andi Eigenmann as Gabrielle (uncredited).
4	"Minsan May Isang Kaibigan"	Avel E. Sunpongco	Mariami Tanangco-Domingo	July 1, 2011
This is a story of Young Alexander (Nash Aguas) and Young Gabrielle (Mika dela Cruz) creating a strong relationship as friends and with Gabrielle developing feelings for Alexander. Starring: Nash Aguas as Young Alexander, Mika dela Cruz as Young Gabrielle and Dante Rivero as Edgardo

== Trivia ==
- All episodes begins with the word "Minsan" meaning "Once" to emphasize the series' title.
- Some episode titles are named after series/songs that the actors playing a main or supporting role have been associated with.
- The series is considered to be one of the highest-rated series of ABS-CBN beating all its competition from other networks namely I ♥ You Pare!, Captain Barbell, Dwarfina, Machete, Munting Heredera, Amaya and Time of My Life of the GMA Network and Babaeng Hampaslupa and The Sisters of TV5.
- Minsan May Simula (Season 1, Episode 1) is the pilot episode and is the second highest-rated episode in the series with a 38.7% ratings share earning first place of the night.
- Minsan Lang Nasa Bahay (Season 1, Episode 2) is named after a line by Lorna Tolentino playing Alondra Sebastiano-Del Tierro.
- Minsan Mong Mahalin Ang Sarili Mo, Para Malaman Mo Kung Gano Kahirap (Season 1, Episode 24) is named after a line by Maja Salvador with the role of Kaye "Krista" Villanueva, with the addition of "Minsan" besides it.
- Minsan Maalaala Mo Kaya (Season 1, Episode 21) is a landmark episode where the series goes back in time 21 years before and the crime that became one of the major secrets throughout the series, it is named after the long-running anthology Maalaala Mo Kaya starring Coco Martin, Maja Salvador, Andi Eigenmann, Martin del Rosario, Lorna Tolentino, John Estrada, Tonton Gutierrez and Boots Anson-Roa with the addition of the word "Minsan"
- Minsan Lang Nagmahal, Sa Maling Tao Pa (Season 1, Episode 26) is named after a line by Boots Anson-Roa playing Remedios "Elena" Sebastiano.
- Minsan Buhay Ang Utang, Buhay Ang Kabayaran (Season 1, Episode 34) is named after a quote by Tonton Gutierrez with the role of Tomas "Bernabe" Sta. Maria, with the addition of "Minsan" besides it.
- Minsan Muling Nagsama (Season 1, Episodes 41-43) are landmark episodes and the only three-part saga in the series and centers around the soldiers and rebels facing each other and realising that they've seen and in fact loved one another.
- Minsan Tayo'y Magkalayo (Season 1, Episode 57) is named after the 2010 series Kung Tayo'y Magkakalayo a Coco Martin and Ronaldo Valdez starrer with the word "Kung" replaced with "Minsan", the episode revolved around Amy Austria-Ventura's character Lora "Rosa" Sebastiano who has gone missing, this is due to the actress Ventura's health issues, she comes back in Season 2, Episode 19 near the end revealing the reason of her absence.
- Minsan Nang Dahil Sa Pag-ibig (Season 2, Episode 5) is named after the song from the show's soundtrack with the addition of "Minsan" and is also the first time the song is played in the background, sung by Bugoy Drilon, the episode is also the third highest-rated episode of the series with a 37.1% ratings share earning third place
- Minsan Kunin Mo Na Ang Lahat Sa Akin (Season 2, Episode 6) is named after the song from the show's soundtrack with the addition of "Minsan" and is also the first time the song is played throughout the series, sung by Angeline Quinto.
- Minsan May Isang Kaibigan (Webisode 4) is the final webisode of the series uploaded on the first of July.
- Minsan Lang May Mamatay (Season 2, Episode 41) is a landmark episode where the character of Remedios Sebastiano played by Boots Anson-Roa passes away.
- Despite its late timeslot change, the show proved to be one of the highest-rated series of ABS-CBN in 2011, still holding a decent number of viewers compared to its rival program Munting Heredera of the GMA Network; because of this the show was to be extended but was not pushed through because of the networks hectic line-up and several follow-up programs for the year.
- Minsan Manirahan Sa Dating Bahay (Season 2, Episode 42) earned the series' first and only sixth place earning 23.2% ratings share.
- Minsan Walang Tatakas Sa Paghihiganti (Season 2, Episode 43) is the series' lowest-rated episode of the series with 22.2% ratings share earning the show's first and only seventh place.
- Minsan May Impostor (Season 2, Episode 45) is named after the 2010 series Impostor starring Maja Salvador, with the addition of the word "Minsan".
- Minsan Walang Kapalit (Season 2, Episode 46) is named after the 2007 series Walang Kapalit starring Amy Austria-Ventura, with the addition of the word "Minsan".
- Minsan Dahil May Isang Ikaw (Season 2, Episode 47) is named after the 2009 series Dahil May Isang Ikaw starring Lorna Tolentino and John Estrada with the addition of the word "Minsan".
- Minsan Sana Maulit Muli (Season 2, Episode 49) is named after the 2007 series Sana Maulit Muli starring Tonton Gutierrez with the addition of the word "Minsan", it is also Andi Eigemann's character, Gabrielle "Gabby" Marcelo's final appearance alive as she gets stabbed by Mimi in the back unintentionally.
- Minsan Saan Ka Man Naroroon (Season 2, Episode 50) is named after 1999 series Saan Ka Man Naroroon starring Boots Anson-Roa with the word "Minsan".
- Minsan May Bukas Pa (Season 2, Episode 51) is named after the 2009 series May Bukas Pa starring Maja Salvador, Martin del Rosario, Lorna Tolentino, John Estrada, Tonton Gutierrez and Dante Rivero with the word "Minsan"
- Minsan Basta't Tayong Dalawa (Season 2, Episode 52) is named after the 2009 series Tayong Dalawa starring Coco Martin with the addition of the word "Minsan Basta't"
- Minsan Mabunyag Ang Buong Katotohanan (Season 2, Episode 56) is a landmark episode where the truth of the twins identity and the fact that Javier and Alexander are Lora and Joaquin's sons are revealed.
- Minsan Lang Kita Inibig (Season 2, Episode 57) is a direct reference to the show's title in past tense and it also marks Joaquin leaving Alondra and Lora leaving Tomas for good.
- Minsan Sumuko (Season 2, Episode 59) marks the death of Tonton Gutierrez's character Tomas and it is also when Javier learns the truth of his real mother and finally surrenders.
- Minsan May Walang Hanggan (Season 2, Episode 60) is the final episode of Season 2 and the whole series and marks the death of several characters including Alondra (Lorna Tolentino), Diego (Ronnie Lazaro) and Ibon (Jojit Lorenzo). The series ends with Lora, Joaquin, Krista, Alexander, Javier and two baby twin brothers. It is also the highest-rated episode of the series, with a 39.1% audience share earning first place of the night. Walang Hanggan is the next project of the lead actor in ABS-CBN.
