= Noemi Oineza =

Filipino former actress (born 1999)

- Born: Tatiana Noemi Urbano Oineza; October 7, 1999 (age 26); Bani, Pangasinan, Philippines
- Years active: 2007–2019
- Agent(s): Star Magic (2007–2016)
- Known for: Mirabella; Maalaala Mo Kaya; Goin' Bulilit
- Relatives: Jane Oineza (sister)

Noemi Oineza (born October 7, 1999) is a Filipino former actress and model. She is best known for her role as Lottie in Princess Sarah. She is also a child star on Goin' Bulilit. Later, she played villainous roles in Wansapanataym, Mirabella, and Aryana, until becoming the protagonist in Maalaala Mo Kaya.

== Filmography ==
=== Television ===
Year	Title	Role
2007	Princess Sarah	Lottie
2007	Goin' Bulilit	Herself
2008	Dyosa	
2009	Pera-perahang lata	Nilo's brother
2010	Love is Only in the Movies	Young Sheye
2012–2013	Aryana	Chelsea Montes
2014	MiraBella	Lilac
2019	Ipaglaban Mo: Sabik	Raisa

=== Film ===
Year	Title	Role
2009	Villa Estrella	Danica
