= List of Mirabella episodes =

The following is a list of episodes of ABS-CBN's Mirabella, which stars Julia Barretto, Enrique Gil, Sam Concepcion and Mika dela Cruz. The soap opera premiered on March 24, 2014, replacing Annaliza. Mirabella airs at 5:45pm (PST), Mondays to Fridays during Primetime Bida. The pilot episode ranked #4 on March 24, 2014 with a rating of 22%.

== Series overview ==
Season	Episodes	Originally released	
Season	Episodes	First released	Last released
1	73	March 24, 2014	July 4, 2014

=== Monthly series overview ===
Month	Episodes	Peak	Average Rating
March 2014	6	22.0% (Episode 1)	18.5%
April 2014	20	21.5% (Episode 22)	18.3%
May 2014	22	23.1% (Episode 42)	20.0%
June 2014	21	21.8% (Episode 69)	19.6%
July 2014	4	27.3% (Episode 73)	24.4%

== Episodes ==
No.	Title	Original release date	Ratings	Whole Day Rank
1	"The Curse Clip"	March 24, 2014	22.0%	#4
2	"Ang Pagsilang ni Mira"	March 25, 2014	20.7%	#4
3	"Ang Kabataan ni Mira"	March 26, 2014	18.8%	#7
4	"Ang Tagumpay ni Mira"	March 27, 2014	17.6%	#8
5	"Hello Jeremy"	March 28, 2014	16.2%	#8
6	"Mira's Surprise"	March 31, 2014	15.7%	#11
7	"The Encounter"	April 1, 2014	15.3%	#11
8	"School Freak"	April 2, 2014	16.4%	#10
9	"The Queen Bee"	April 3, 2014	13.9%	#18
10	"The Accident"	April 4, 2014	15.6%	#12
11	"Falling For You"	April 7, 2014	16.8%	#8
12	"The Prank"	April 8, 2014	17.8%	#6
13	"The Evil Plan"	April 9, 2014	18.9%	#5
14	"Love is Blind"	April 10, 2014	17.2%	#8
15	"Mother's Love"	April 11, 2014	16.1%	#9
16	"True Beauty"	April 14, 2014	19.0%	#6
17	"Come Up Against"	April 15, 2014	18.2%	#6
18	"The Revelation"	April 16, 2014	18.2%	#5
19	"The Magic Tree"	April 21, 2014	20.5%	#5
20	"No To Bullying"	April 22, 2014	19.6%	#5
21	"The Freak Show"	April 23, 2014	20.8%	#5
22	"To The Beautiful You"	April 24, 2014	21.5%	#5
23	"Stand By Me"	April 25, 2014	19.2%	#5
24	"Makeover"	April 28, 2014	20.4%	#5
25	"The Transformation"	April 29, 2014	21.0%	#5
26	"Episode 26"	April 30, 2014	21.0%	#5
27	"Episode 27"	May 1, 2014	20.6%	#5
28	"Episode 28"	May 2, 2014	19.7%	#5
29	"Episode 29"	May 5, 2014	17.8%	#5
30	"Episode 30"	May 6, 2014	17.1%	#6
31	"Episode 31"	May 7, 2014	18.2%	#5
32	"Episode 32"	May 8, 2014	19.8%	#5
33	"Episode 33"	May 9, 2014	19.1%	#5
34	"Episode 34"	May 12, 2014	19.9%	#5
35	"Episode 35"	May 13, 2014	19.4%	#5
36	"Episode 36"	May 14, 2014	20.7%	#5
37	"Episode 37"	May 15, 2014	19.5%	#5
38	"Episode 38"	May 16, 2014	19.2%	#5
39	"Episode 39"	May 19, 2014	20.7%	#5
40	"Episode 40"	May 20, 2014	19.7%	#5
41	"Episode 41"	May 21, 2014	22.1%	#5
42	"Episode 42"	May 22, 2014	22.6%	#5
43	"Episode 43"	May 23, 2014	23.1%	#5
44	"Episode 44"	May 26, 2014	21.0%	#5
45	"Episode 45"	May 27, 2014	21.3%	#5
46	"Episode 46"	May 28, 2014	19.7%	#5
47	"Episode 47"	May 29, 2014	18.6%	#5
48	"Episode 48"	May 30, 2014	20.5%	#5
49	"Episode 49"	June 2, 2014	19.5%	#5
50	"Episode 50"	June 3, 2014	19.9%	#5
51	"Episode 51"	June 4, 2014	20.9%	#5
52	"Episode 52"	June 5, 2014	20.9%	#4
53	"Episode 53"	June 6, 2014	21.7%	#5
54	"Episode 54"	June 9, 2014	20.9%	#5
55	"Episode 55"	June 10, 2014	19.6%	#5
56	"Episode 56"	June 11, 2014	20.0%	#5
57	"Episode 57"	June 12, 2014	20.1%	#5
58	"Episode 58"	June 13, 2014	20.5%	#5
59	"Episode 59"	June 16, 2014	18.2%	#5
60	"Episode 60"	June 17, 2014	20.1%	#4
61	"Episode 61"	June 18, 2014	19.5%	#5
62	"Episode 62"	June 19, 2014	18.3%	#5
63	"Episode 63"	June 20, 2014	17.9%	#7
64	"Episode 64"	June 23, 2014	17.7%	#6
65	"Episode 65"	June 24, 2014	17.0%	#6
66	"Episode 66"	June 25, 2014	19.1%	#5
67	"Episode 67"	June 26, 2014	21.2%	#5
68	"Episode 68"	June 27, 2014	18.6%	#5
69	"Episode 69"	June 30, 2014	21.8%	#5
70	"Episode 70"	July 1, 2014	21.3%	#4
71	"Episode 71"	July 2, 2014	23.0%	#4
72	"Episode 72"	July 3, 2014	26.2%	#4
73	"The Beautiful Ending"	July 4, 2014	27.3%	#4
