= Villa Estrella =

2009 horror film by Rico Maria Ilarde

- Theatrical poster
- Directed by: Rico Maria Ilarde
- Screenplay by: Joel Mercado; Rico Maria Ilarde; Adolfo Alix Jr.; John Paul Abellera
- Story by: Joel Mercado
- Produced by: Charo Santos-Concio; Malou N. Santos
- Starring: Shaina Magdayao; Jake Cuenca; Maja Salvador; Geoff Eigenmann; John Estrada
- Cinematography: Luis Quirino
- Edited by: Renewin Alano
- Music by: Malek Lopez
- Production company: Star Cinema
- Release date: July 1, 2009 (Philippines)
- Running time: 95 minutes
- Country: Philippines
- Language: Filipino
- Budget: ₱50.8 million

Villa Estrella is a 2009 Philippine horror film directed by Rico Maria Ilarde from a screenplay he co-wrote with John Paul Abellera, Adolfo Alix Jr., and Joel Mercado, who solely made the story concept. The film stars Shaina Magdayao, Jake Cuenca, Maja Salvador, Geoff Eigenmann, and John Estrada.

Produced and distributed by Star Cinema, the film was theatrically released on July 1, 2009, as an offering for the film studio's 16th anniversary.

== Plot ==
Anna has recurring dreams of a woman drowning. She and her ex-boyfriend Alex go to their families' resort, Villa Estrella, to mend their relationship. At a stopover, Madame Reza, a fortune-teller, tells Anna that a restless spirit is haunting her in her dreams, trying to send a message and return to life. At the resort, Anna is met by the long-time caretaker, Gusting, and Jennifer, the walking-impaired daughter of another caretaker, Suzy. Suzy reveals that Jennifer has an imaginary friend named Danica, who is actually a child who drowned in the resort's swimming pool.

While Anna sketches Jennifer, a creature emerges from the pool and seizes two property developers. Anna later sees Gusting walking around in the woods and encounters a woman, whom Anna assumes to be Jennifer's elder sister Giselle. She tells her that Gusting is searching for his missing daughter Andrea, but walks away when Anna asks how she disappeared.

Anna goes to the pool and stumbles upon a mirror but sees Danica in the reflection. Startled, Anna falls into the water and is pulled down by the creature before being rescued by Alex. Upon recovering, Giselle warns Anna that the pool is inhabited by vengeful spirits, and reveals that she is also searching for her father. Later that night, Jennifer is lured into the pool by Danica and pulled into the water by the creature before reemerging and casting an ominous glance at Anna. As Jennifer and Suzy move out, Jennifer throws away Anna's sketch of her, claiming that it is not hers, before removing her leg cast. Anna then stumbles across Giselle, who turns out to have a different face and has just only arrived at the resort.

Anna's boyfriend Dennis arrives at the resort to comfort her. While searching for his companion Otap, who was also pulled into the pool by the creature, Dennis falls into a sinkhole and stumbles upon Andrea's remains underneath the foundation of the swimming pool.

Anna calls Madame Reza, who tells her that Jennifer was possessed by Danica in the pool and that her spirit is already in the afterlife. As Reza tells her to flee, the woman Anna mistook for Giselle appears and tells her that she stole her life. She then chases Anna before the latter runs into Alex. That evening, the couple's respective fathers Eddie and Dave arrive at the resort. Dennis tells Dave of his discovery but is killed by the latter with a silenced pistol.

Anna discovers that it is Andrea who has been haunting and chasing her after finding her picture in Gusting's room. She then realizes that Andrea was her playmate who was strangled and buried by Dave and Eddie underneath the pool's foundation after resisting their sexual advances fifteen years prior. Anna, the only witness, was threatened by her father into staying silent despite Andrea's pleas, explaining the latter's wrath towards her. Gusting arrives and tells Anna that she was the last person seen with Andrea, prompting Anna to admit his daughter's death. As Gusting asks her who was responsible, Eddie arrives and takes Anna away. Realizing the truth, Gusting attacks Eddie, but is thrown down the stairs and knocked unconscious.

As Dave washes off evidence of Dennis' murder at the swimming pool, the creature emerges and reveals herself to be Andrea before pulling him into the water. Meanwhile, Anna confronts her father over Andrea's death but is interrupted by Alex, who tells her to run. After a fight, Eddie overpowers Alex and prepares to kill him when he sees Andrea. Eddie flees but is fatally stabbed by Gusting beside the pool.

As Anna mourns, Andrea begs her to let her possess her body to be with Gusting one last time. Anna refuses, but after seeing her necklace on a poolside statue, she goes to retrieve it, only for the statue to collapse on top of her into the water, allowing Andrea to claim her body.

A year later, Andrea, in Anna's body, claims Alex as her boyfriend and celebrates Gusting's birthday as she sees her original reflection in a mirror. Later, she is attacked by Anna's spirit.

== Cast ==
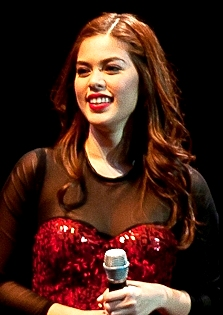
Shaina Magdayao portrays Anna.

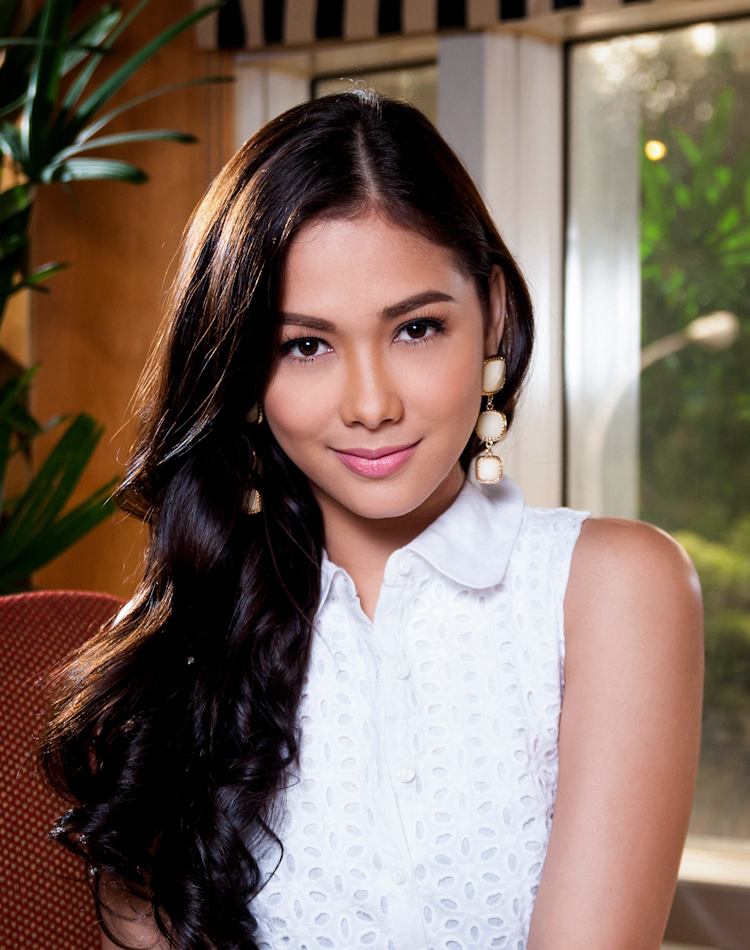
Maja Salvador portrays Andrea.

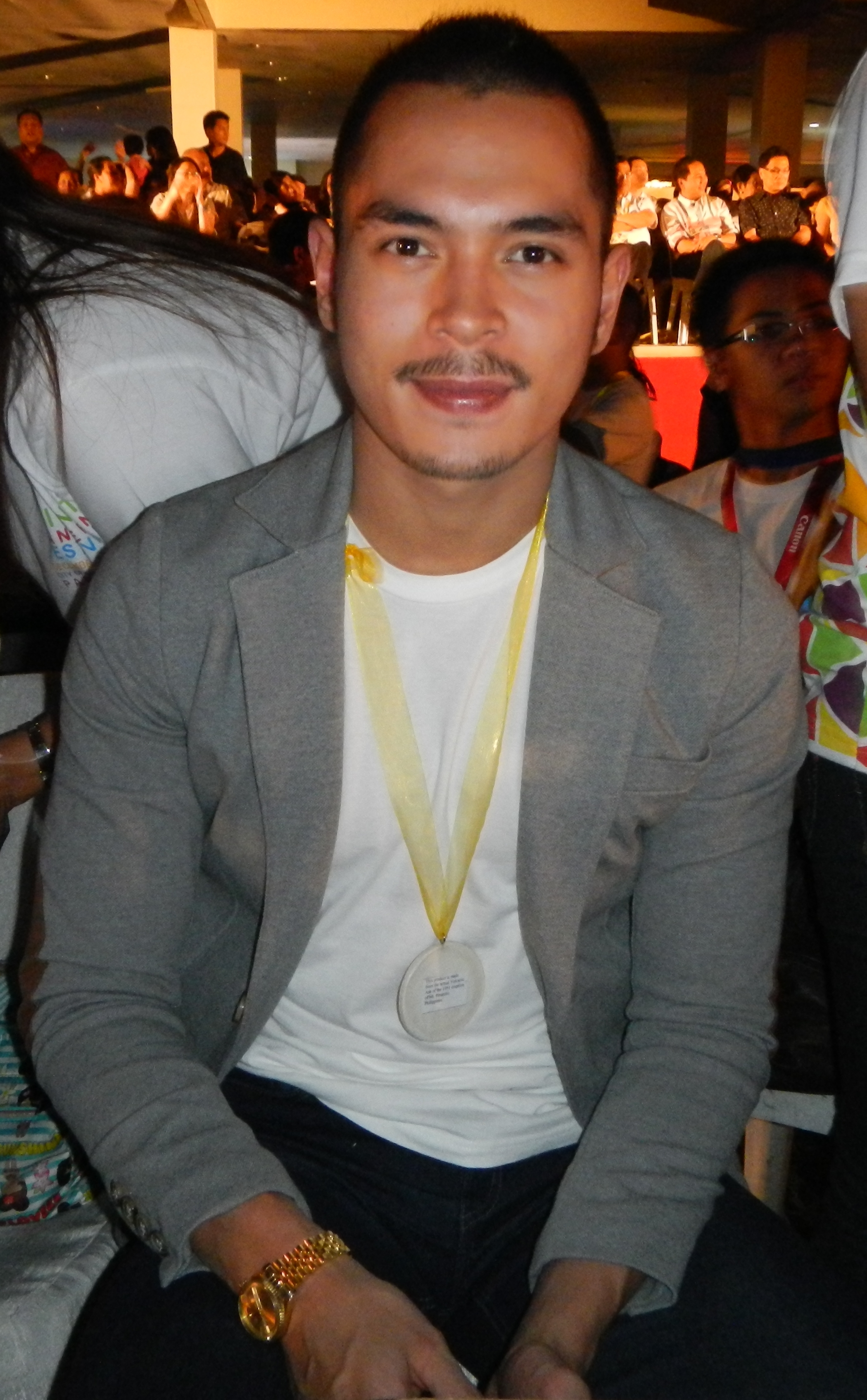
Jake Cuenca portrays Alex.

Main cast

- Shaina Magdayao as Anna
- Maja Salvador as Andrea
- Jake Cuenca as Alex
- Geoff Eigenmann as Dennis
- John Estrada as Eddie

Supporting cast

- John Arcilla as Dave
- Ronnie Lazaro as Gusting
- Rubi Rubi as Suzy
- Celine Lim as Jennifer
- Noemi Oineza as Danica
- Liza Lorena as Madame Reza
- Yayo Aguila as Anna's mother
- Empoy Marquez as Otap
- Eda Nolan as Giselle
- Richard Quan as Angelo
- Cheska Billones as Young Ana
- Patrick Moreno as Young Alex

== Promotions ==
Villa Estrella had a lack of promotion from both Star Cinema and ABS-CBN, having no movie premiere night due to Shaina Magdayao, Jake Cuenca and Maja Salvador being overseas for the Star Magic World Concert Tour from June 26–28 in Canada and the United States.

== Box office ==
Despite being poorly advertised, Villa Estrella debuted at no. 3 on its 1st week run earning P21 million in Metro Manila alone. By its second week, it remained in no. 3, earned P36,343,703.9.

The film's total gross for its 4-week run was P46,394,496.00.

== See also ==
- List of ghost films
