= Mika dela Cruz =

Filipino actress (born 1998)

Mika Dela Cruz
- Born: Mariko Nicolette Egger dela Cruz; December 9, 1998 (age 27); Tokyo, Japan
- Other name: Mikaela
- Occupations: Actress; singer
- Years active: 2005–2020, 2024–present
- Agents: Star Magic (2005–2016, 2024–present) GMA Artist Center (2016–2020); PPL Entertainment, Inc. (2016–2020)
- Spouse: Nash Aguas (m. 2024)
- Relatives: Angelika dela Cruz (sister); Edward dela Cruz (brother); Erick dela Cruz (brother)

Mariko Nicolette "Mika" Egger dela Cruz-Victoriano (born December 9, 1998) is a Filipino actress. She was formerly an artist of GMA Network.

== Personal life ==
Mika was born in Tokyo, Japan to a Japanese biological father and an Italian-Austrian mother Angelica Egger. She used the surname Dela Cruz to be recognized more easily in the entertainment business, having an older sibling with a career in the industry. She also had a stepfather named Ernie Dela Cruz (now deceased), who accepted her into the family. She is the younger half-sister of Angelika Dela Cruz. Despite her ethnic background, Mika identifies as Filipino.

She married her long-time partner and co-actor in Goin' Bulilit, Nash Aguas in 2024. The couple, who started their relationship since October 20, 2018 and was engaged since January 2024, were married at the Adriano's Events Place and Prayer Garden in Tagaytay.

== Career ==
Mika started her entertainment career with ABS-CBN Network. Mika is known for portraying teenage or older characters, and is usually paired with Nash Aguas, Andre Garcia and Aaron Junatas.

On November 8, 2016, after 11 years with Star Magic, Mika officially signs with GMA Artist Center and becomes a contract artist of GMA Network.

== Filmography ==
=== Film ===
Year	Title	Role
2007	Tiyanaks	Water Tiyanak
2007	My Kuya's Wedding	Young Yvette
2008	SupahPapalicious	Juno's child
2009	T2	Angeli
2009	Ang Darling Kong Aswang	Angel
2010	RPG Metanoia	May "Mayumi" / Cassandra
2015	Angela Markado	Imee

=== Television ===
Year	Title	Role
2006–2011	Goin' Bulilit	
2007	Maria Flordeluna	Ma. Flordeluna "Flor" E. Alicante II / Julia Alicante
2008	Eva Fonda	Elena "Leleng" De Jesus
2008	Imposible	Julie Dizon
2008	Iisa Pa Lamang	Young Sofia Castillejos / Sofia Ramirez
2008	Sine Novela: Una Kang Naging Akin	Anna
2009	Precious Hearts Romances Presents: My Cheating Heart	Young Nadine Zapanta
2009	Dahil May Isang Ikaw	Young Ella/Angela "Ella" Alferos-Ramirez
2009	Kambal sa Uma	Young Marie Perea/Vira Mae Ocampo
2009	Maalaala Mo Kaya: Bisikleta	Young Chen
2010	Ilumina	Sinukuan
2010	M3: Malay Mo Ma-develop	Ara
2010	Maalaala Mo Kaya: Kalapati	Kid Viel
2010	Maalaala Mo Kaya: Larawan	Ikay
2010	Maalaala Mo Kaya: Seaweeds	Charm
2011	Ikaw ay Pag-Ibig	Stephanie
2011	Wansapanataym: Cacai Kikay	Young Cacai
2011	Wansapanataym: Housemates ni lola	Grace
2011	Guns and Roses	Young Reign Santana
2011	Minsan Lang Kita Iibigin	Young Gabrielle "Gabby" Marcelo
2011	Maalaala Mo Kaya: Itak	Young Jovel
2012	Maalaala Mo Kaya: Panyo	Rio Santos
2013	Luv U: Season 2	Marjorie "Marj" De Silva
2014	Mirabella	Iris Robles
2015	You're My Home	Jennifer
2015	Maalaala Mo Kaya: Spaghetti	Teen Lara
2015	Maalaala Mo Kaya: Itak	Aileen
2015	Be Careful with My Heart: Maya Loves Sir Chief	Ella Garcia
2016	Ipaglaban Mo: Lason	Richelle
2016	Wish Ko Lang: Magkapatid	Irish
2017	Meant to Be	Mariko Altamirano
2017	Dear Uge	Clea
2017	Dear Uge: K-Drama rama	Rona
2017	Wish Ko Lang: Sisiw, Lobo at Laruan	Jaymee
2017	Wish Ko Lang: Cheerleader	Jenny
2017	Wish Ko Lang	Mia
2017	Daig Kayo ng Lola Ko: Si Liam Langgam at si Mulong Tikpalong	Chummy
2017	Daig Kayo ng Lola Ko	Langgam
2018	Sherlock Jr.	Michelle
2018	Magpakailanman: The Blind Teacher	Kristine Medina
2018	Dear Uge: May tatlong mommy	Julie
2018	Dear Uge: My nanay pasaway	Lorna
2018	Wish Ko Lang: Binenta sa Arabo	Marj
2018	Pamilya Roces	Donatella "Donna" Rosales
2019	Wish Ko Lang: Tuhog	April
2019	Kara Mia	Mia Lacson
2019	Daddy's Gurl	Hillary
2019	Dear Uge: Yaya-manin	Alyana

== Awards and nominations ==
Year	Organization	Category	Work	Result
2009	Metro Manila Film Festival	Best Child Actress	Ang Darling Kong Aswang	Nominated
2009	Dangal ng Pilipinas Awards (Consumers League of the Philippines)	Best Promising Child Drama Actress		Won
2010	12th Gawad PASADO Awards	Best Supporting Actress		Won
2010	PMPC Star Award	Best Child Film Actress	T2	Won
