= Vice Ganda filmography =

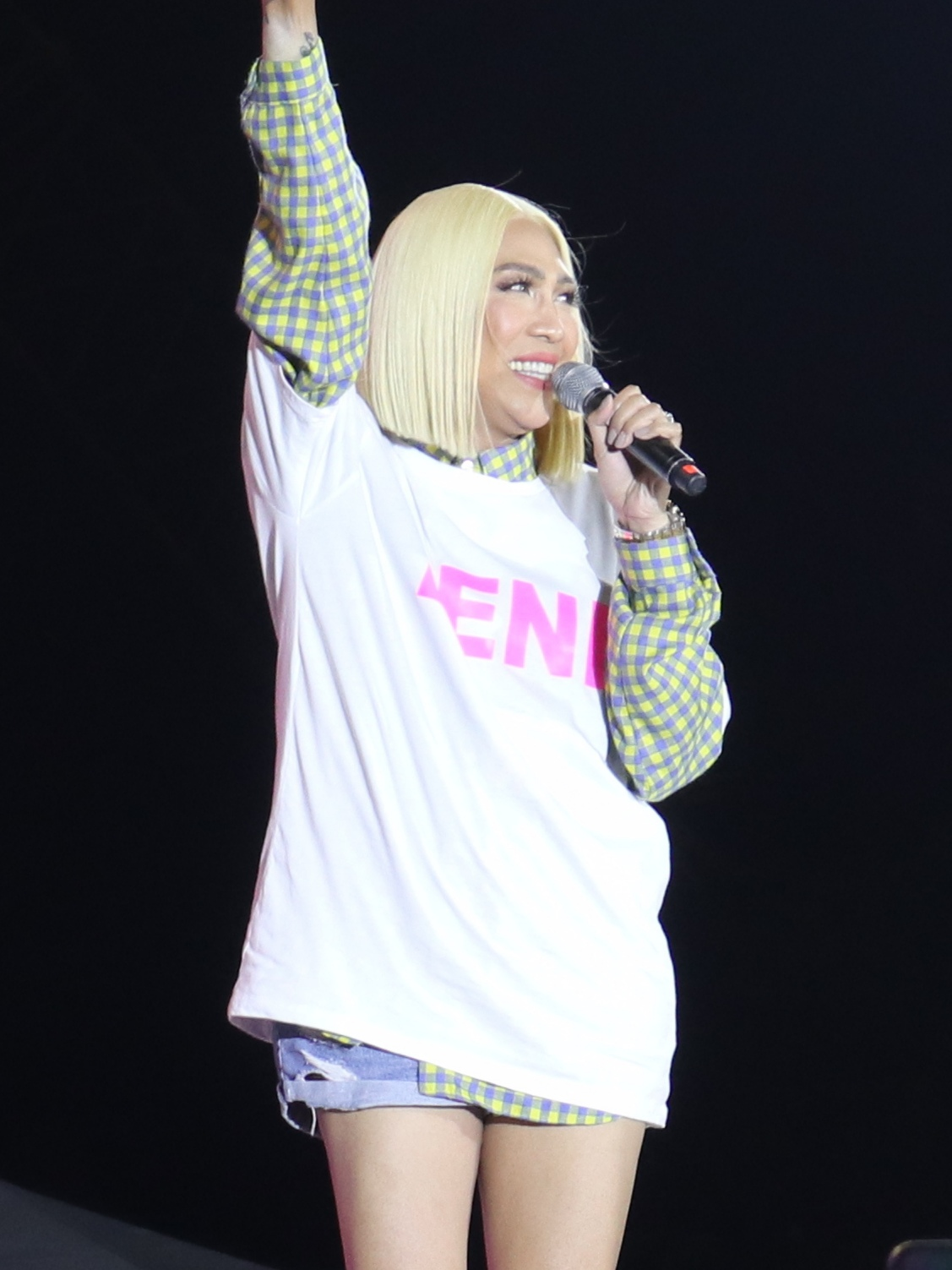

Vice Ganda is a Filipino comedian, actor, reality show judge, television host, and recording artist.

Viceral appeared in several television series and sitcoms such as Dyosa, under the direction of Wenn V. Deramas. Vice also had another supporting role in the drama series Maging Sino Ka Man: Ang Pagbabalik. In 2009, he became part of Showtime, a talent search program who was tapped to be the "unevictable" hurado until 2012 when he became the main host of its noontime format. His life story of being bullied as a young, closeted homosexual has also been featured in the drama anthology, Maalaala Mo Kaya. He was the host of his own Sunday talk show, the top rated Gandang Gabi, Vice!, the show ended in 2020 after 9 years of airing in ABS-CBN. Currently, he is under the management of ABS-CBN, and handling him is business unit head Deo Endrinal after being managed for four years by local entertainment columnist/host Ogie Diaz. In 2016, he became one of the judges of the fifth season of Pilipinas Got Talent alongside Robin Padilla, Angel Locsin, and Freddie M. Garcia.

Viceral starred in minor roles until 2009, where he appeared alongside Vilma Santos and John Lloyd Cruz in the film In My Life. A year later he starred in a remake of the comedy film, Petrang Kabayo, which was an instant hit at its release. The following year, Vice starred in Praybeyt Benjamin with Derek Ramsay, directed by Wenn V. Deramas. The movie became the first local film to reach 300 million pesos in ticket sales, and proved to be an even greater box office success than Petrang Kabayo. He is presently under contract with Viva Films. In 2012, he starred in the Filipino comedy film This Guy's In Love With U Mare! under Star Cinema and Viva Films, alongside Luis Manzano and Toni Gonzaga, directed by Wenn V. Deramas. He had a cameo in the film Bromance: My Brother's Romance in 2013. He made another movie called Girl, Boy, Bakla, Tomboy. In 2014, Star Cinema released a movie called The Amazing Praybeyt Benjamin an official entry for the MMFF 2014. He participated alongside actress Alex Gonzaga, and actors Richard Yap and James "Bimby" Aquino-Yap. The film was directed by Wenn V. Deramas. In 2015, Star Cinema released Beauty and the Bestie, an official entry for the MMFF 2015. He participated alongside actor Coco Martin, Kapamilya loveteam James Reid and Nadine Lustre or shortly called as JaDine, actors Marco Masa and Alonzo Muhlach, and comedians MC Calaquian and Lassy Marquez. The film was directed by Wenn V. Deramas. He is the first person in the history of Philippine cinema to receive the award Phenomenal Box-Office Star for five consecutive years.

In 2016, his movie, The Super Parental Guardians got rejected to the MMFF 2016; prior to the rejection, it was shown in theaters earlier than people expected. It was released on November 30, 2016 and has grossed P75 Million on their first day, making it the Highest First Day Gross in PH Cinema history surpassing My Bebe Love. This also marks as his non-MMFF film after 4 years since Sisterakas in 2012.

== Film ==
Year	Title	Role	Note	Producer
1999	Sa Paraiso ni Efren	Gossip Girl/Cameo	Uncredited	Good Harvest Productions
2007	Apat Dapat, Dapat Apat: Friends 4 Lyf and Death	Res' Chinese Employer	Guest role	Viva Films
2008	Condo	Mandy	First Supporting role	Breaking The Box Productions; Kamurayaw Pictures
2008	Ikaw Pa Rin: Bongga Ka Boy!	Host of awitin talento ng barangay	Guest role	Viva Films
2009	In My Life	Hillary	Supporting role	ABS-CBN Film Productions; Star Cinema
2010	Noy	Jane	Supporting role	CineMedia Films; VIP Access Media
2010	Hating Kapatid	Beauty	Supporting role	Viva Films
2010	Petrang Kabayo	Peter Kasimsiman / Pedro / Petra	First Lead role in a film	Viva Films
2011	The Unkabogable Praybeyt Benjamin	Benjamin "Benjie" Santos XIII	First Lead role in a film	ABS-CBN Film Productions, Inc. Viva Films & Star Cinema
2012	This Guy's in Love With U Mare	Lester Reyes	Lead role	ABS-CBN Film Productions, Inc. Viva Films & Star Cinema
2012	24/7 in Love	Nadine	Guest appearance	ABS-CBN Film Productions; Star Cinema
2012	Sisterakas	Bernardo "Bernice" Laurel Sabroso / Totoy	Lead role, Official Entry for the 38th Metro Manila Film Festival, It Nominated for Best Actor, the 38th Metro Manila Film Festival	ABS-CBN Film Productions, Inc. Viva Films & Star Cinema
2013	Coming Soon	Himself / Cameo	Guest appearance	Viva Films
2013	Bromance: My Brother's Romance	Wedding Gatecrasher	Guest appearance	ABS-CBN Film Productions; Skylight Films
2013	Girl, Boy, Bakla, Tomboy	Marklyn Monroe "Girlie" Jackstone / Peter Jackstone / Mark Jill Jackstone / Pattie "Panying" Jackstone	Lead role, Official Entry for the 39th Metro Manila Film Festival, It Nominated for Best Actor, the 39th Metro Manila Film Festival	ABS-CBN Film Productions, Inc. Viva Films & Star Cinema
2014	Moron 5.2: The Transformation	Himself / Cameo	Guest appearance	Viva Films
2014	The Amazing Praybeyt Benjamin	Col. Benjamin "Benjie" Santos XIII	Lead role, Official Entry for the 40th Metro Manila Film Festival	ABS-CBN Film Productions, Inc. Viva Films & Star Cinema
2015	Beauty and the Bestie	Erik "Erika" Albano Villavicencio / Natalia Thalia Nutriela	Lead role, Official Entry for the 41st Metro Manila Film Festival	ABS-CBN Film Productions, Inc. Viva Films & Star Cinema
2016	The Super Parental Guardians	Ariel Arciaco "Arci" Tualava	Lead role	ABS-CBN Film Productions; Star Cinema
2017	Woke Up Like This	Basketball Coach / Cameo	Guest appearance	Regal Entertainment
2017	Gandarrapido: The Revenger Squad	Emerson "Emy" Mariposque / Gandarra	Lead role, Official Entry for the 43rd Metro Manila Film Festival	ABS-CBN Film Productions, Inc. Viva Films & Star Cinema
2018	Fantastica	Belat Padilla / Princess Drilon	Lead role, Official Entry for the 44th Metro Manila Film Festival	ABS-CBN Film Productions, Inc. Viva Films & Star Cinema
2019	Familia Blondina	Himself / Cameo	Guest appearance	Arctic Sky Entertainment
2019	The Mall, The Merrier	Moises "Moira" Molina	Lead role, Official Entry for the 45th Metro Manila Film Festival	ABS-CBN Film Productions, Inc. Viva Films & Star Cinema
2022	Partners in Crime	Jack Cayanan	Lead role, Official Entry for the 48th Metro Manila Film Festival	Star Cinema; Viva Films; ABS-CBN Films
2024	And the Breadwinner Is...	Bamboo "Bambi" Salvador	Lead role, Official Entry for the 50th Metro Manila Film Festival, It Nominated for Best Actor, First Best Actor; 73rd FAMAS Awards	ABS-CBN Studios; The IdeaFirst Company & Star Cinema
2025	Call Me Mother	Twinkelito “Twinkle” Paoros Reyes/de Guzman	Lead role, Official Entry for the 51st Metro Manila Film Festival, it won Best Actor 51st Metro Manila Film Festival	ABS-CBN Studios; The IdeaFirst Company; Viva Films & Star Cinema
2026	The Greatest Showdown	Queenie	Lead role, Official Entry for the 52nd Metro Manila Film Festival	ABS-CBN Studios; Star Cinema; The IdeaFirst Company; APT Entertainment & M-Zet Productions

== Television ==
Year	Title	Role
1999	Judy Ann Drama Special	Antonia
1999	Comedy Central Market	Various Roles
1999, 2002	SOP	Himself / Guest Performer
2001, 2002	SiS	Himself / Guest Performer
2002	Eat Bulaga!	Contender / Ingrid Montecarlo
2002, 2005	Morning Girls with Kris and Korina	Himself / Guest
2005	M.R.S.	Performer
2007	Kokey	Lyka Horse
2007–2008	Game Ka Na Ba?	Celebrity Contestant / Guest
2007–2009	Boy & Kris	Guest
2007–2008	Maging Sino Ka Man: Ang Pagbabalik	Joko
2008, 2009	Wowowee	Celebrity Contestant / Guest
2008, 2014	The Singing Bee	Celebrity Contestant / Guest
2008	Ligaw Na Bulaklak	Tony
2008	Dyosa	Salaminsim
2008	Pieta	Tita Ganda
2009	Maalaala Mo Kaya	Bestfriend of Arnie/ Bola/Ball Himself
2009	Only You	Bicky Tio
2009	May Bukas Pa	Maxie
2009–present	It's Showtime	Main Host
2010	Magpasikat	Main Host
2010	Pinoy Big Brother: Double Up	Guest
2011	Your Song	Mars
2011	100 Days to Heaven	August
2011	I Dare You	Challenger
2011–2020; 2026–present	Gandang Gabi, Vice!	Main Host
2012, 2014	The Buzz	Guest Host
2013–2017	Showtime Holy Week Special	Various Roles
2013	Juan dela Cruz	Santana
2013	The Voice of the Philippines	Performer
2014	Pinoy Big Brother: All In	House Guest
2015	Your Face Sounds Familiar	Guest Jury
2016–2017, 2024–present	Family Feud	Celebrity Contestant / Guest
2016–2018	Pilipinas Got Talent	Judge
2016	FPJ's Ang Probinsiyano	Emmanuel David Moreno / Ella / Magdalena / Sharmaine Flores / Beverly
2016	Pinoy Big Brother: Lucky 7	Guest
2016	Pinoy Boyband Superstar	Judge
2016	Home Sweetie Home	Ariel Ciriaco Tualava
2019	Search For The Idol Philippines	Judge
2019	Pinoy Big Brother: Otso	Guest
2021	Your Face Sounds Familiar	Celebrity Contestant / Guest
2021–present	Everybody, Sing!	Main Host
2024	LOL: Last Out Laughing Philippines	Main host
2025	Rainbow Rumble	Celebrity Contestant / Guest
2025	Pinoy Big Brother: Celebrity Collab Edition	Guest
2025	Bubble Gang	Guest
2025	Pinoy Big Brother: Celebrity Collab Edition 2.0	Guest
