= DJ Durano =

Filipino actor (born 1974)

- Born: Thaddeus Cabiluna Durano Jr. August 17, 1974 (age 52); Cebu City, Philippines
- Occupations: Actor, television personality, recording artist
- Years active: 1986–present
- Agent(s): Viva Artists Agency; Tyronne Escalante Artist Management
- Political party: BAKUD
- Partner: Joanne Maranan
- Children: 2
- Parent: Thaddeus "Deo" Durano Sr.

Thaddeus Cabiluna Durano Jr. (born August 17, 1974), known professionally as DJ Durano, is a Filipino actor, television personality, singer, recording artist, and politician. His career in entertainment started as part of That's Entertainment of German Moreno.

== Early life and education ==
Durano grew up in Cebu and hails from the Durano political clan of the province. He is the nephew of incumbent Danao City vice-mayor Ramon Durano III.

== Other ventures ==
=== Politics ===
Durano filed for candidacy in the mayoral elections in Sogod, Cebu, to be held in May 2025. His platform includes promoting affordable water among the residents of Sogod, addressing their concerns about high electricity rates, and completing the construction of unfinished road projects. He will run for mayor under the Durano-led Barug Alang Sa Kauswagan Ug Demokrasya (transl. Stand Up For Progress and Democracy) political party. Durano emphasized that although he is known to the public as an actor from Manila, he is determined to prove to the Cebuanos that he is a true Visayan.

== Personal life ==
Durano has two children, singer-actress Yen Durano and Jaden Dominique Durano.

== Filmography ==
=== Film ===
Year	Title	Role
1993	Leonardo Delos Reyes: Alyas Waway	Karto
1997	Sanggano	Men in Attitude at Quiapo Vendor
2006	Kapag Tumibok Ang Puso: Not Once, But Twice	Louie
2007	Apat Dapat, Dapat Apat: Friends 4 Lyf and Death	Totoy Bato Bato Pick
2007	Ang Cute Ng Ina Mo	Delfin
2008	Baler	Pablo / Ambo
2008	Pasukob	Dino
2008	Ang Tanging Ina Ninyong Lahat	Vice President Bill Bilyones
2009	BFF: Best Friends Forever	Eric
2009	Ang Tanging Pamilya: A Marry Go Round	Archie
2010	Hating Kapatid	Noel Salvador
2010	Petrang Kabayo	Dickson Santos
2010	Ang Tanging Ina Mo: Last Na 'To!	Ryan Harold
2011	Who's That Girl	Johnny
2011	Tumbok	Ward
2011	The Unkabogable Praybeyt Benjamin	Dominador "Dondi" Rosales
2012	Corazon: Ang Unang Aswang	Raffy
2012	Moron 5 and the Crying Lady	Mozart Twister "Mo" Aquino
2012	This Guy's in Love with U Mare!	David
2012	Sisterakas	James
2013	Raketeros	
2013	Ang Huling Henya	Andrew Alvarez
2013	Boy Golden: Shoot to Kill, the Arturo Porcuna Story	Entong Intsik
2014	Moron 5.2: The Transformation	Mozart Twister Aquino
2014	The Amazing Praybeyt Benjamin	Dominador "Dondi" Rosales
2018	The Hopeful Romantic	Leon Carreon
2018	Para Sa Broken Hearted	Henry
2022	Maid in Malacañang	Benigno Aquino Jr.
2023	Pinoy Ghost Tales	The Assistant Director
2024	GG: Good Game	Tito Rexy
2026	Humaling	Julian

=== Television ===
Year	Title	Role
1986–1996	That's Entertainment	Himself
2004	Marina	Nanding
2005	Pablo S. Gomez's Kampanerang Kuba	Anghel
2006	Komiks Presents: Da Adventures of Pedro Penduko	Haring Haddi
2007	Sineserye Presents: Palimos ng Pag-ibig	Paolo
2007	Kokey	Mr. DJ
2007	Walang Kapalit	Bryan Bermudez
2008	Volta	Anthony
2008	Sineserye Presents: Maligno	SPO2 Damien Dumlao
2008	My Girl	John
2008	Love Spell: Elay Enchanted	Gil
2008	Carlo J. Caparas' Pieta	Kabo
2008	Dyosa	Dexter
2009	Precious Hearts Romances Presents: Ang Lalaking Nagmahal Sa Akin	Greg
2010	Precious Hearts Romances Presents: Lumang Piso Para Sa Puso	Councilor Magtulis
2010	Habang May Buhay	Rod
2010	Rosalka	Teddy
2010	Kokey @ Ako	Dr. DJ Caparas
2010	Sabel	Fr. Manny
2011	Mula sa Puso	Ysmael Matias
2012	P. S. I Love You	Atty. Fortanilla
2012	Oka2Kat	Mayor Alfonso
2012	Wako Wako	Dado Calleja
2012	Kahit Puso'y Masugatan	Luis Gerona
2013	Maalaala Mo Kaya: Rosas	Captain
2013	Pyra: Babaeng Apoy	Cesar Lucente
2013	Jim Fernandez's Galema, Anak Ni Zuma	Frederick Kazumi
2014	Mirabella	Manuel Laurel
2015	My Fair Lady	Marcelo
2016	Born for You	Leonard Marasigan
2016	FPJ's Ang Probinsyano	Mr. Wang's right-hand man
2018	Brush	Dr. Blue
2019	Dragon Lady	James Liu
2019–2020	Pamilya Ko	Antonio "Tonio" Alvarez
2021	Heartful Café	Jeremiah Nobleza
2022	Magpakailanman: Teenage Mama: The Abbygail Fernandez Story	Jeffrey
2022	Lolong	Alberto "Boss Abet" Dominguez
2023–2024	Black Rider	Olivares "Bokal" Geronimo
2026	Miss Behave	Victor Rodriguez
