= Moron 5.2: The Transformation =

- Theatrical release poster
- Directed by: Wenn V. Deramas
- Screenplay by: Mel Mendoza-Del Rosario; Wenn V. Deramas
- Story by: Wenn V. Deramas
- Produced by: Vic del Rosario Jr.
- Starring: Luis Manzano; Billy Crawford; Marvin Agustin; DJ Durano; Matteo Guidicelli; John Lapus
- Cinematography: Elmer H. Despa
- Edited by: Marya Ignacio
- Music by: Vincent de Jesus
- Production companies: Viva Films; MVP Entertainment (uncredited)
- Distributed by: Viva Films
- Release date: November 5, 2014
- Running time: 92 minutes
- Country: Philippines
- Languages: Filipino; English
- Box office: ₱33 Million

Moron 5.2: The Transformation is a 2014 Filipino superhero comedy film and the direct sequel to Moron 5 and the Crying Lady starring Luis Manzano, Billy Crawford, Marvin Agustin, Matteo Guidicelli, DJ Durano and John Lapus.. The title “Moron 5” is a play on the name of the American pop rock band, Maroon 5.

Unlike the first film, MVP Entertainment was not involved the film. This is also the last film appearance of comedian German Moreno, who died in a cardiac arrest in Quezon City, Diliman on January 8, 2016, aged 82.

The film also stars Matteo Guidicelli as a replacement of Martin Escudero due to his scheduling conflicts with Feng Shui 2.

== Plot ==
The film begins with the ending scene from the first movie, where Albert Macapagal, Isaac Estrada, Aristotle Ramos, Mozart Twister Aquino, and Michael Angelo Marcos graduated from high school. Albert narrates that they had no idea there would be a sequel and that they only discovered their dreams after finishing college.

Albert aspired to be a lawyer but quit law school due to pressure. He became a hopia salesman in Binondo, got married, and had a child named Marcus (Macoy).

Isaac aspired to enter showbiz but never received callbacks. He ended up working as security personnel at showbiz events, got married, and had a son named Fidel.

Aristotle aspired to be a chef but was repeatedly fired from five-star hotels and restaurants due to his mistakes. He decided to open a bakery, got married, and had a daughter named Gloria.

Mozart aspired to compete in bodybuilding competitions but ended up working in a local gym, where he frequently got into trouble due to being accident-prone. When his mother won a lottery jackpot, he suggested using the money to open a fitness gym. He also got married and had a daughter named Korina (Cory).

Michael Angelo suffered severe facial burns after mistakenly pouring kerosene on their barbecue grill and needed reconstructive plastic surgery. Post-surgery, his new face resembled Matteo Guidicelli's instead of his original face (Mart Escudero). The doctor remarked that his new face could attract girlfriends, including Sarah Geronimo. However, Michael Angelo fell in love with Filomena, Aristotle's aunt.

Despite Albert, Isaac, Aris, Mozart, and Michael Angelo being known for their foolishness, their children are quite the opposite.

Macoy, Gloria, Fidel, and Cory devised a plan to avoid embarrassment caused by their fathers. During their school's recognition ceremony, the fathers, known collectively as the Moron 5, noticed other men being called on stage as the children's fathers. The children were eventually caught red-handed by their parents, having paid the men to pose as their fathers.

One night, during a drinking session, the group witnessed a bright light falling from the sky, which was actually from an airplane struck by lightning. Albert, however, believed it came from space and had superhuman powers. When they placed their hands on the so-called "power source," they were struck by lightning. Convinced they had gained superpowers, they decided to use their abilities to help others. They rebranded themselves from the usual Moron 5 to M5, with Albert as M1, Isaac as M2, Aristotle as M3, Mozart as M4, and Michael Angelo as M5.

The M5's archnemesis, Becky Pamintuan, escapes from a mental facility and plans her revenge on them. Learning about M5, she decides to locate their hideout and seize their power source. After clashing with a terrorist group led by Abdul Ado Remi, Becky and her cohorts abduct the M5's families. She calls Albert, informing him that she has both their families and their "power source."

When the M5 arrived at their hideout, they found Becky holding their families hostage. She demanded they activate the power source in exchange for their freedom. Unbeknownst to the M5, Becky had a remote control capable of shaking the ground. A TV monitor then revealed that they did not have any superpowers and the power source was a hoax. Distraught by this revelation, Becky was taken back to the mental hospital.

During another recognition ceremony, Macoy declared that the ones truly deserving of recognition were their fathers.

== Cast ==
=== Main characters ===
- Luis Manzano as Albert Macapagal
- Billy Crawford as Isaac Estrada
- Marvin Agustin as Aristotle Ramos
- DJ Durano as Mozart Twister Aquino
- Matteo Guidicelli as Michael Angelo Marcos
  - Martin Escudero as Michael Angelo in flashback (uncredited)
- John Lapus as Becky Pamintuan

=== Supporting characters ===
- Nikki Valdez as Marife Ramos
- Mylene Dizon as Sally Aquino
- Yam Concepcion as Selina Macapagal
- Danita Paner as Amor Estrada
- Joy Viado† as Sarah Joy/Aunt of Aris (flashback)
- German Moreno† as Isaac's father
- Dennis Padilla as Michael's father
- Jon Santos as Albert's mother
- Divina Valencia as Albert's mother-in-law
- Deborah Sun as Mozart's mother
- Joey Paras† as Congressman King
- Karla Estrada as Doctor 1
- Manuel Chua as Thomas
- Boom Labrusca as Edison
- Chrome Cosio as Benok
- Marco Masa as Marcos "Macoy" Macapagal
- Chlaui Malayao as Corina "Coring" Aquino
- Rain Prince Allan Quite as Fidel Estrada
- Gabriel Soldevilla as Gloria Ramos
- Lao Raymundo as Professor
- Jelson Bay as Doctor 2
- Atak Araña as Albert's brother-in-law
- Tess Antonio as Principal
- Ricky Rivero† as Hostage Taker
- Rubi Rubi as Doctor 3
- Daniel Pacia as Aristotle's brother-in-law
- Carlos Agassi as Abdul Ador Remi
- Marnie Lapus as Jeannie Lim Napoles

=== Special participation ===
- Vhong Navarro as himself
- Vice Ganda as himself

== Filming ==
The filming began in 2013 and wrapped up in about 2 months.

== Reception ==
The film received a negative review from one critic for its casting, storyline, and some crude humor.
