= Celebrity Playtime =

2015–16 Philippine television game show

- Title card
- Genre: Game show
- Developed by: Louie Andrada
- Written by: Bernice Bautista
- Directed by: Arnel Natividad; Erick C. Salud
- Presented by: Billy Crawford; Luis Manzano
- Country of origin: Philippines
- Original language: Tagalog
- No. of episodes: 37

Production
- Executive producer: Laurenti Dyogi
- Production locations: ABS-CBN Studios, ABS-CBN Broadcasting Center, Quezon City
- Editor: Froilan Santiago
- Camera setup: Multiple-camera setup
- Running time: 45 minutes
- Production company: ABS-CBN Studios

Original release
- Network: ABS-CBN
- Release: September 26, 2015 – April 3, 2016

Related
- Family Feud (April 9, 2016 – May 7, 2017)

Celebrity Playtime is a Philippine television game show broadcast by ABS-CBN. Originally hosted by Billy Crawford. It aired on the network's Yes Weekend! line up from September 26, 2015 to April 3, 2016, replacing Luv U and was replaced by Family Feud. Luis Manzano serve as the final host. The show features celebrities playing house party games.

== Hosts ==
The hosts of Celebrity Playtime

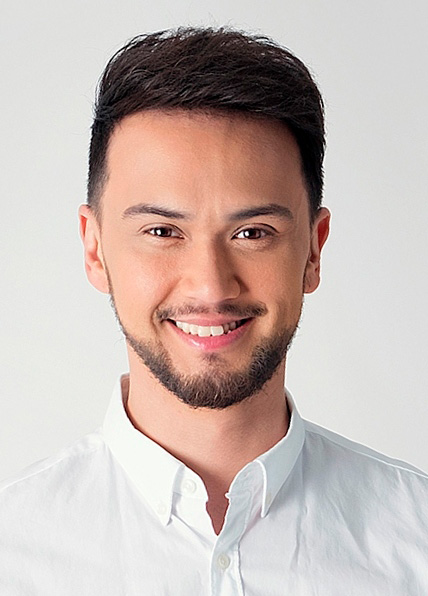
Billy Crawford

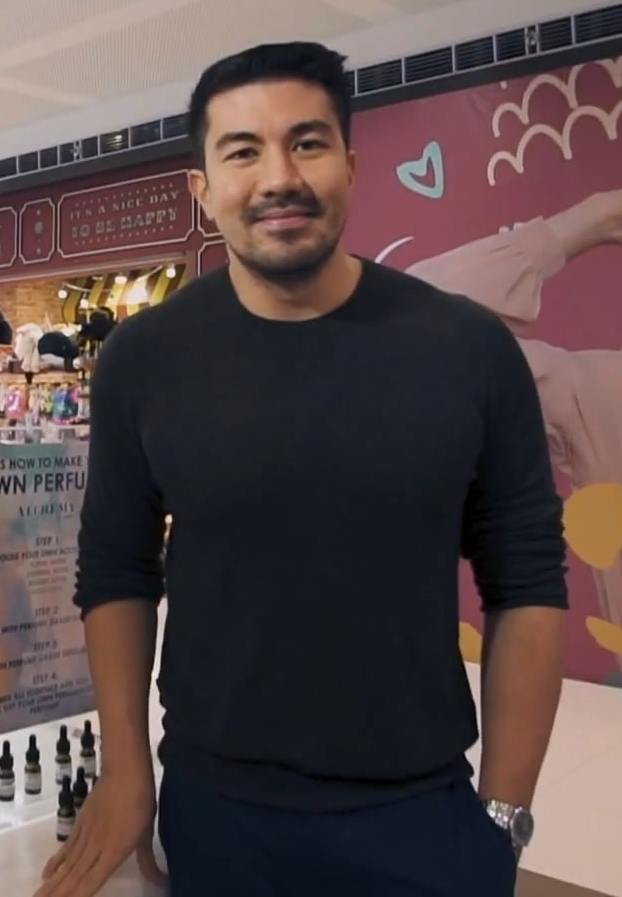
Luis Manzano

- Billy Crawford (episodes 1-7)
- Luis Manzano (episodes 8-38)

=== Band ===
- Six Part Invention

=== Guest co-hosts ===
- Robi Domingo (episode 8)
- Alex Gonzaga (episode 8)

== Format ==
This show was similar to Hollywood Game Night.

=== Original ===
Each week, two teams of celebrity players will play three house party games to earn points for their team. After the third game, the team with the most points wins 100,000 pesos. This team advances to the bonus round, where they can take home an additional prize up to 200,000 pesos. These teams are playing on a road to five playoffs. The first team to enter the fifth jackpot rounds will be declared the defending champion, and will be playing against another team.

=== Updated ===
Two teams consisting of eight celebrity contestants will play various house party games to earn 100,000 pesos. In minigames, if contestants are performing better, or otherwise correct, the team will earn one to two people depending on game. If they perform worse, or otherwise are wrong, the other team may steal, at most, games. They are given limited time per game. After three games, the points are counted, and the team with most points will win 100,000 pesos, and will be eligible for the jackpot round. In the jackpot round, the minigame is always Lights, Camera, Act-song!, and one has to guess the song by seeing the contestants' actions, and the noise-cancelling headphones have to be worn. The winning individual will win up to 300,000 pesos, depending on streak.

== Segments ==
=== Team Minigames ===
| Minigame No. | Minigame Title and Description | Time Limit |
|---|---|---|
| 1 | Hirap I-Spellengin; A word is given, and one contestant needs to spell out a letter. If one is successful, another contestant spells another until the word is complete. If so, another team will spell the word out. If one team spell the word wrong, the opposing team gets a point. If both teams manage to spell one word correctly, no points will be given to either team. | 90 seconds |
| 2 | (♪) Perfect Song-bination; Two songs will be sung, most of the time combined into a single song. The contestants need to guess what are the two songs that are being played. If the two songs were correct, the team gets a point and the song changes. If one song from the two songs was answered wrong, the opposite team can steal and guess the title of the two songs. If both teams failed, a new set of contestants will answer a new set of two songs. | 2 minutes |
| 3 | (♪) Sing-a-Zoo; One contestant has to hum the song by imitating an animal sound that is assigned. The others from the same team have to guess what the contestant is singing. If the answer is correct, the team gets 2 points and the animal and the song changes. | 90 seconds |
| 4 | (♪) Bitin To No; The song is going to be played using the piano. They have to guess what song that they are played. 90 seconds are given. | 90 seconds |
| 5 | (♪) Transla-songs; The song is going to be played either in English or Tagalog. They have to translate the song to the opposing language. | 2 minutes |
| 6 | Blanket Ba Ganyan? Using the blanket, a contestant has to make something using a blanket. If they are correct and has put enough effort, they are given a point. Contestants are also encouraged to be creative. | 90 seconds |
| 7 | Mukhang Pera; A combination of faces of the Philippine peso bill and coins will be shown. They have to compute mentally as fast as they can and be able to identify how much is the given value. | 90 seconds |
| 8 | (♪) Guess the Tutut; Every player will pick a word from the bowl, and they have to think a song that the word they picked will be mentioned. | 90 seconds |
| 9 | Gamitin Mo Ako; Teams will choose a category. They have to choose one person who will be the team's "Human Prop" and they should be able to use him/her as their prop and let their teammates guess the item they got from their categories | 90 seconds |
| 10 | (♪) Kalitono; In this game, players will play as head-to-head to guess only one song title from the two songs combined. If the player wasn't able to answer within five seconds as their individual time, the opponent can steal his/her turn. | 2 minutes |
| 11 | (♪) Sing-Awoo; Similar to 'Sing-Azoo Challenge', one contestant has to change the lyrics of the song to "Awoo." The others from the same team have to guess what the contestant is singing. | 90 seconds |
| 12 | Order Taker; One contestant will give the hints to the food and the players will guest what food it is | 60 seconds |
| 12 | Buddy-Body One team member will guess three-letter English and Tagalog words. The other 3 teammates must pose as one of the letters of the word using only their body parts. | 90 seconds |
| 13 | (♪) Your Sound Sounds Familiar | – |
| 14 | (♪) Ayusing Natin To | – |
| 15 | SaliTao | – |
| 16 | (♪) Tunog TV | – |
| 17 | 2 Minute to Mention | – |
| 18 | News Ko Po | – |
| 19 | Ayos Na Ang Bugtong-Bugtong | – |
| 20 | In Your Face | – |
| 21 | (♪) Nasa Line Na Ang Lahat | – |
| 22 | PelikuLanguage | – |
| 23 | (♪) SiNGDiViDUAL | – |
| 24 | Asa Ka Pa | – |
| 25 | (♪) ContinuaSong | – |
| 25 | Use In A Sentence | – |
| 26 | Biya-Hula | – |
| 27 | Wala Ba Kayong Mga Kamay | – |
| 28 | Once Upon A Time | – |
| 29 | (♪) Song-Sunod | – |
| 30 | (♪) Sing-No-'To | – |
| 31 | Once Upon A Time | – |
| 32 | CateGora | – |
| 33 | Act-Tres | – |

Note: The list is incomplete, you may help to add more.

=== Jackpot Round ===
- (♪) Lights, Camera, Act-song!: One contestant has to wear noise-cancelling headphones, and then he/she has to guess what song they are song by seeing the contestants' actions. 2 minutes are given.

== Celebrities appeared on the show ==
=== Team Ka-Familiar vs Team DEEL ===
| Episode No. | Date of Broadcast | Team Ka-Familiar | Team DEEL | Scores | Winning team |
|---|---|---|---|---|---|
| 1 | September 26, 2015 | Karla Estrada; Nyoy Volante; Edgar Allan Guzman; Melai Cantiveros | Long Mejia; Epi Quizon; Eric Nicolas; Dennis Padilla | 17-7 | Team Ka-Familiar |
| 2 | October 3, 2015 | Karla Estrada; Nyoy Volante; Edgar Allan Guzman; Melai Cantiveros | Long Mejia; Epi Quizon; Eric Nicolas; Dennis Padilla | 12-22 | Team DEEL |
| 3 | October 10, 2015 | Karla Estrada; Nyoy Volante; Edgar Allan Guzman; Melai Cantiveros | Long Mejia; Epi Quizon; Eric Nicolas; Dennis Padilla | TBD | Team Ka-Familiar |
| 4 | October 17, 2015 | Karla Estrada; Nyoy Volante; Edgar Allan Guzman; Melai Cantiveros | Long Mejia; Epi Quizon; Eric Nicolas; Dennis Padilla | 25-24 | Team Ka-Familiar |
| 5 | October 24, 2015 | Karla Estrada; Nyoy Volante; Edgar Allan Guzman; Melai Cantiveros | Long Mejia; Vandolph; Eric Nicolas; Dennis Padilla | 6-12 | Team DEEL |
| 6 | October 30, 2015 | Karla Estrada; Nyoy Volante; Edgar Allan Guzman; Melai Cantiveros | Long Mejia; Epi Quizon; Eric Nicolas; Dennis Padilla | 16-8 | Team Ka-Familiar |
| 7 | November 7, 2015 | Karla Estrada; Nyoy Volante; Edgar Allan Guzman; Melai Cantiveros | Long Mejia; Vandolph; Eric Nicolas; Dennis Padilla | 18-20 | Team DEEL |
| 8 | November 14, 2015 | Karla Estrada; Nyoy Volante; Edgar Allan Guzman; Melai Cantiveros | Long Mejia; Epi Quizon; Eric Nicolas; Dennis Padilla | 16-2 | Team Ka-Familiar |

=== Team Ka-Familiar vs KomedyanTeam ===
| Episode No. | Date of Broadcast | Team Ka-Familiar | KomedyanTeam | Scores | Winning team |
|---|---|---|---|---|---|
| 9 | November 21, 2015 | Karla Estrada; Nyoy Volante; Edgar Allan Guzman; Melai Cantiveros | Niño Muhlach; Randy Santiago; Bayani Agbayani; Joey Marquez | 10-5 | Team Ka-Familiar |
| 10 | December 5, 2015 | Karla Estrada; Nyoy Volante; Edgar Allan Guzman; Melai Cantiveros | Niño Muhlach; Randy Santiago; Bayani Agbayani; Joey Marquez | 12-6 | Team Ka-Familiar |
| 11 | December 12, 2015 | Karla Estrada; Nyoy Volante; Jay R Melai Cantiveros | Niño Muhlach; Jason Gainza; Bayani Agbayani; Joey Marquez | 20-13 | Team Ka-Familiar |

=== Team Ka-Familiar vs Team Beauty ===
| Episode No. | Date of Broadcast | Team Ka-Familiar | Team Beauty | Scores | Winning team |
|---|---|---|---|---|---|
| 12 | December 19, 2015 | Karla Estrada; Tutti Caringal; Jay R Melai Cantiveros | Vice Ganda; MC Calaquian; Lassy Marquez; Ryan Bang | 15-14 | Team Ka-Familiar |
| 13 | December 26, 2015 | Karla Estrada; Tutti Caringal; Jay R Melai Cantiveros | Vice Ganda; MC Calaquian; Lassy Marquez; Ryan Bang | 20-8 | Team Ka-Familiar |

Note: Team Beauty supposed to play again for another week. However, they decided to quit the game after Ryan's personal reason which urged them to quit the show

=== Team Ka-Familiar vs Team Building ===
| Episode No. | Date of Broadcast | Team Ka-Familiar | Team Building | Scores | Winning team |
|---|---|---|---|---|---|
| 14 | January 2, 2016 | Karla Estrada; Nyoy Volante; Jay R Melai Cantiveros | Pokwang; Chokoleit†; Pooh; K Brosas | 21-8 | Team Ka-Familiar |
| 15 | January 9, 2016 | Karla Estrada; Nyoy Volante; Edgar Allan Guzman; Melai Cantiveros | Pokwang; Chokoleit†; Pooh; K Brosas | 7-11 | Team Building |
| 16 | January 16, 2016 | Karla Estrada; Nyoy Volante; Edgar Allan Guzman; Melai Cantiveros | Pokwang; Chokoleit†; Pooh; K Brosas | 24-13 | Team Ka-Familiar |
| 17 | January 23, 2016 | Karla Estrada; Nyoy Volante; Edgar Allan Guzman; Melai Cantiveros | Pokwang; Chokoleit†; Pooh; K Brosas | 14-13 | Team Ka-Familiar |

=== Team Ka-Familiar vs Team Chiu ===
| Episode No. | Date of Broadcast | Team Ka-Familiar | Team Chiu | Scores | Winning team |
|---|---|---|---|---|---|
| 18 | January 24, 2016 | Karla Estrada; Nyoy Volante; Edgar Allan Guzman; Melai Cantiveros | Joross Gamboa; Ketchup Eusebio; Matt Evans; Janus del Prado | 7-5 | Team Ka-Familiar |
| 19 | January 30, 2016 | Karla Estrada; Nyoy Volante; Edgar Allan Guzman; Melai Cantiveros | Joross Gamboa; Ketchup Eusebio; Matt Evans; Janus del Prado | 11-14 | Team Ka-Familiar |
| 20 | January 31, 2016 | Karla Estrada; Nyoy Volante; Edgar Allan Guzman; Melai Cantiveros | Joross Gamboa; Ketchup Eusebio; Matt Evans; Janus del Prado | 5-3 | Team Ka-Familiar |

=== Team Ka-Familiar vs Team Shorties ===
| Episode No. | Date of Broadcast | Team Ka-Familiar | Team Shorties | Scores | Winning team |
|---|---|---|---|---|---|
| 21 | February 6, 2016 | Karla Estrada; Nyoy Volante; Edgar Allan Guzman; Melai Cantiveros | Yeng Constantino; Angeline Quinto; KZ Tandingan; Denise Laurel | 9-5 | Team Ka-Familiar |
| 22 | February 7, 2016 | Karla Estrada; Nyoy Volante; Edgar Allan Guzman; Melai Cantiveros | Yeng Constantino; Angeline Quinto; KZ Tandingan; Denise Laurel | TBD | Team Ka-Familiar |
| 23 | February 13, 2016 | Karla Estrada; Nyoy Volante; Edgar Allan Guzman; Jay R | Angeline Quinto; KZ Tandingan; Kyla; Sam Concepcion | 17-7 | Team Ka-Familiar |

Note: Team Ka-Familiar has entered the hall of fame, new set of teams will replace.

=== Team 90's vs Team Pasion ===
| Episode No. | Date of Broadcast | Team 90's | Team Pasion | Scores | Winning team |
|---|---|---|---|---|---|
| 24 | February 14, 2016 | Ogie Diaz; Gelli de Belen; Carmina Villarroel; Aiko Melendez | Ron Morales; Joseph Marco; Jake Cuenca; Ejay Falcon | 15-11 | Team 90's |
| 25 | February 20, 2016 | Ogie Diaz; Gelli de Belen; Carmina Villarroel; Aiko Melendez | Ron Morales; Joseph Marco; Jake Cuenca; Ejay Falcon | 18-8 | Team 90's |
| 26 | February 21, 2016 | Ogie Diaz; Gelli de Belen; Carmina Villarroel; Aiko Melendez | Ron Morales; Joseph Marco; Jake Cuenca; Ejay Falcon | 13-17 | Team Pasion |

Note: Team Pasion was supposed to play again for another week but they decided to quit for personal reasons.

=== Team 90's vs Di MaaTeam ===
| Episode No. | Date of Broadcast | Team 90's | Di MaaTeam | Scores | Winning team |
|---|---|---|---|---|---|
| 27 | February 27, 2016 | Gelli de Belen; Candy Pangilinan; Carmina Villarroel; Aiko Melendez | Jennie Gabriel; Ethel Booba; Negi; Iyah Mina | 15-10 | Team 90's |
| 28 | February 28, 2016 | Gelli de Belen; Candy Pangilinan; Carmina Villarroel; Aiko Melendez | Jennie Gabriel; Ethel Booba; Negi; Iyah Mina | 10-8 | Team 90's |
| 29 | March 5, 2016 | Gelli de Belen; Candy Pangilinan; Carmina Villarroel; Aiko Melendez | Jennie Gabriel; Ethel Booba; Negi; Iyah Mina | 22-16 | Team 90's |

=== Team 90's vs Team Queens ===
| Episode No. | Date of Broadcast | Team 90's | Team Queens | Scores | Winning team |
|---|---|---|---|---|---|
| 30 | March 6, 2016 | Ogie Diaz; Candy Pangilinan; Carmina Villarroel; Aiko Melendez | Bianca Manalo; Venus Raj; Ariella Arida; Melanie Marquez | 14-8 | Team 90's |
| 31 | March 12, 2016 | Ogie Diaz; Candy Pangilinan; Carmina Villarroel; Aiko Melendez | Bianca Manalo; Venus Raj; Ariella Arida; Melanie Marquez | 13-9 | Team 90's |
| 32 | March 13, 2016 | Ogie Diaz; Candy Pangilinan; Carmina Villarroel; Aiko Melendez | Bianca Manalo; Venus Raj; Ariella Arida; Melanie Marquez | 10-7 | Team 90's |

=== Team 90's vs Team Summer Babes ===
| Episode No. | Date of Broadcast | Team 90's | Team Summer Babes | Scores | Winning team |
|---|---|---|---|---|---|
| 33 | March 19, 2016 | Ogie Diaz; Candy Pangilinan; Carmina Villarroel; Aiko Melendez | Myrtle Sarrosa; Sarah Lahbati; Bea Rose Santiago; Mary Jean Lastimosa | 29-26 | Team 90's |
| 34 | March 20, 2016 | Ogie Diaz; Candy Pangilinan; Carmina Villarroel; Aiko Melendez | Myrtle Sarrosa; Sarah Lahbati; Bea Rose Santiago; Mary Jean Lastimosa | 14-15 | Team Summer Babes |
| 35 | March 27, 2016 | Ogie Diaz; Candy Pangilinan; Carmina Villarroel; Aiko Melendez | Myrtle Sarrosa; Sarah Lahbati; Bea Rose Santiago; Mary Jean Lastimosa | 13-11 | Team 90's |
| 36 | April 2, 2016 | Gelli de Belen; Candy Pangilinan; Carmina Villarroel; Aiko Melendez | Myrtle Sarrosa; Sarah Lahbati; Bea Rose Santiago; Mary Jean Lastimosa | 20-11 | Team 90's |
| 37 | April 3, 2016 | Gelli de Belen; Candy Pangilinan; Carmina Villarroel; Aiko Melendez | Myrtle Sarrosa; Sarah Lahbati; Bea Rose Santiago; Mary Jean Lastimosa | 6-4 | Team 90's |

Note: The 37th and final episode is a special episode for the exhibition game.
