= This Guy's in Love with U Mare! =

- Theatrical release poster
- Directed by: Wenn V. Deramas
- Screenplay by: Mel Mendoza-Del Rosario; Keiko Aquino; Wenn V. Deramas
- Story by: Wenn V. Deramas
- Produced by: Charo Santos-Concio; Malou Santos; Vic R. del Rosario Jr.
- Starring: Toni Gonzaga; Vice Ganda; Luis Manzano
- Cinematography: Elmer Despa
- Edited by: Marya Ignacio
- Music by: Vincent de Jesus
- Production companies: ABS-CBN Film Productions, Inc.; Viva Films
- Distributed by: Star Cinema
- Release date: October 10, 2012
- Running time: 102 minutes
- Country: Philippines
- Language: Filipino
- Box office: ₱200 million (US$5 million)

This Guy's in Love with U Mare! is a 2012 Filipino romantic comedy film under Star Cinema and Viva Films. It stars Luis Manzano, Vice Ganda and Toni Gonzaga, and it is directed by Wenn V. Deramas. The film received mixed reviews from Filipino critics.

== Plot ==
After three years of a happy relationship, Mike decides to end his relationship with his gay lover, Lester, After their break-up, Lester soon finds out that Mike had been cheating on him for the past year with a bank accountant Gemma. This leads to Lester hatching a plan to destroy Mike and Gemma's relationship, by acting like a straight man so that Mike will come back to him. He tells his four gay friends who are also his employees in his parlor, Babushka, Ricky, Fanny and Bambi to pretend to rob Gemma after her shift. Lester pretends to be her "knight and shining armor" and saves her from the "robbers". After the ruckus, Gemma takes Lester home to meet her parents. After a dinner with Gemma's family, Lester goes home. He stops by his parlor and shocked at his friend's broken faces (the bruises he left after he saved Gemma from them). After they try to have their revenge on him, he soon apologizes and get together again. Gemma calls Mike that same evening, telling him that Mike should meet with Lester in order for him to learn martial arts, which he declines. With his family suffering from poverty, Mike does not know where to get money for his and Gemma's wedding. He proposes to Gemma, which causes Lester to hatch his plan.

Lester visits and deposits P5,000,000 on their bank account. Gemma and Mike met up again, after seeing the flowers that Lester gave Gemma (Mike does not know who Gemma's suitor is) he becomes extremely upset, caused them to argue. Gemma and Lester start dating. Gemma is visited by her family in her room. Her mother asks her if she loves Lester, she replies that she is confused and unsure what to answer. One day at her job, Lester calls and invites to come to The Dream Concert she really wants to go. Afterwards, Mike learns that it was Lester who was Gemma's suitor. After playing basketball, Lester falls ill and is taken care of by Gemma. Lester learns that Gemma is a good person and wants to stop what he was doing to her. Mike tells Gemma that something is wrong. He then brings Gemma to Lester's house and shows her his room filled with pictures of Mike, upon which Gemma becomes angry and disappointed. He then breaks up with Mike and calls off their wedding.

Mike apologizes to Lester for using him, which Lester accepts. Gemma eventually forgives Mike and Lester.

Gemma and Mike got married at a beach and live happily ever after. Lester finds his one true love - a guy that saved him from a bridge where he almost drowned. However, he found out that he is the priest officiating Gemma and Mike's wedding, traumatizing him.

== Cast ==
=== Main cast ===
- Toni Gonzaga as Gemma
- Vice Ganda as Lester Reyes
- Luis Manzano as Mike

=== Supporting cast ===
- DJ Durano as David, Lester's brother-in-law, and Terry's husband
- Gladys Reyes-Sommereux as Terry, Lester's sister-in-law, and David's wife
- Karla Estrada as Mike's Mom
- Ricci Chan as Bambi
- Lassy Marquez as Ricky
- IC Mendoza as Babushka
- Ricky Rivero as Fanny
- Cecil Paz as Tancing
- Eagle Riggs as Baldo
- Manuel Chua as Peter
- Buboy Garovillo as Gemma's Daddy
- Carla Martinez as Gemma's Mom
- Edgar Mortiz as Mike's Dad
- Tessie Tomas as Blessie Reyes, Lester's Aunt
- Abby Bautista as Mike's niece
- Jayson Gainza as Nitoy, Mike's Oldest brother
- Edward Mendez as Mike's Older brother
- Dang Cruz as Mike's Sister-in-law, Nitoy's wife
- Carlo Lacana as Cocoy/Larry
- Via Antonio as Mike's sister-in-law
- Tess Antonio as Brenda
- Chanel Latorre as Mike's Younger sister
- Clavin Joseph Gomez as Carjo

=== Special participation ===
- Sam Milby as Lord
- Aegis
- April Boy Regino as himself
- Melijah Pantuirlla as David's Younger daughter
- Kyle Kevin Ang as David's Older son
- Francis Mark Billiones as David's Youngest son/Macky
- Donita Nose as Stand-up comedian himself
- MC Muah as Stand-up comedian himself
- Wacky Kiray as Stand-up comedian himself
- Rita Rosario Carlos as Suicidal Bride

== Background and development ==
The film was first announced on April 19, 2012, through Star Cinema. Vice Ganda, who has one of the lead roles supposed to do first the film Two and a half Sisters with Anne Curtis and Sarah Geronimo, but it was postponed due to Geronimo's busy schedule. Wenn V. Deramas, the director decided to do this film first and is slated for October 2012 release. In an interview with the casts on TV Patrol, Ganda claimed that with all humility, this film is expected to break the record of his own film The Unkabogable Praybeyt Benjamin (2011) which is the highest-grossing Filipino film of all time before The Mistress of John Lloyd Cruz and Bea Alonzo became the Highest-grossing Filipino film of all time. The film had its press conference on July 17, 2012, and began shooting on June 17, 2012. Toni Gonzaga also quoted in an interview that she is excited to do the film with his friends, Ganda and Manzano. This movie is Toni Gonzaga's first movie produced by Viva Films.

Reports told that the film is a "love-triangle" film.

== Reception ==
=== Critical reception ===
Professional ratings
Review scores
| Source | Rating |
|---|---|
| Click The City | 4/5 stars |
| Young Critics Circle | 1/5 stars |
| Pisara | 2.5/5 stars |

Philbert Ortiz Dy of ClickTheCity gave the film a favorable review. He states that,"...I have to admit I’m a little astounded by This Guy’s In Love with U, Mare. The sexual politics of the film are really intriguing, and surprisingly progressive for a mainstream release. The film depicts relationships that go far beyond the hetero-normative ideals usually portrayed in mainstream cinema. The movie has plenty of fun with gender roles, confounding larger ideas about what it means to be straight or gay in a modern society. It ends up making a case for a more fluid form of sexuality, one that isn’t limited by prejudices towards femininity or masculinity.". He also cite some bad sides of the film stating, "...Some of the elements of the formula are still kind of annoying[...]The premise is a little hacky, and the comedy gets old really fast[...]is a lot less pleasing. The comedy still feels stale. Laughs are mostly generated through sped up footage, making fun of people for being ugly and word-for-word recitations of dramatic scenes from other movies. Some of the gags are stretched out for far too long, and that extends the film’s runtime".

Mark Angelo Ching of PEP.ph stated his review through his personal website. He stated that "What makes this movie okay is the abundance of smart jokes. There are many sight gags and hidden jokes in many scenes that are played with no hard effort[...] Vice's best scenes happen in the first half, when he's on a revenge streak. When he calms down and the movie gets dramatic, the film gets boring." The other lead characters, on the other hand, deliver shaky performances. Toni Gonzaga portrays her character to be smart, but then she fails to see Lester's true intent. Luis Manzano plays his character dumb at times, and smart at times, it gets confusing what is right. In fairness, this may not be the two actors' fault, but the director's.

A review from Twitch Film gave the film a poor rating. Ogg Cruz stated, "It is what it is, a disposable piece of entertainment that does not have the will or courage to reinvent the wheel. As a product of commerce, the film understandably insists on being merely lightweight, parading characters that are mere two-dimensional sketches with either a skewed or an overly simplistic understanding of gender roles and morality. The film manages to be funny within the very same framework that all comedies about self-deprecating gays are funny[...]While it is apparent that there are attempts to blur the borders between genders and relationships, it unfortunately misses the opportunity to actually create discourse out of its premise, to graduate from the decades-old subgenre."

Skilty Labastilla of the Young Critics Circle Film Desk, on the other hand, lambasted the film, saying that the film is "shrill, unfunny, and disturbing". He adds, "the film’s bigger sins, in my opinion, has little to do with its filmmaking and everything to with its peddling of disturbing messages: 1) To be a real man, one has to be physically violent., 2) Making fun of people whose looks do not meet society’s standards of beauty is completely OK., and 3) Gay men will lust after every young man they see."

=== Box-office ===
According to Mico Del Rosario, advertising and promotion manager for Star Cinema, the movie grosses PHP 23 Million on its opening day. The film grosses P123 Million on its first week. P315 Million as of its 3rd week of showing and still counting.

== Theme song ==
- The theme song has been re-edited from the lyrics and the title song "This Guy's In Love With You Pare" by Parokya ni Edgar, with the instrumental inspired by Carly Rae Jepsen's "Call Me Maybe."
