= Panahon Ko 'to!: Ang Game Show ng Buhay Ko =

2010 Philippine television game show

- Genre: Game show Trivia
- Created by: Bong Barrameda
- Directed by: Bobet Vidanes
- Creative director: Bobet Vidanes
- Presented by: Luis Manzano; Billy Crawford
- Country of origin: Philippines
- Original language: Filipino
- No. of seasons: 1
- No. of episodes: 109

Production
- Executive producer: Ana-Carla Katrina Rodriguez
- Camera setup: Multiple-camera setup
- Running time: 21 minutes
- Production company: ABS-CBN Studios

Original release
- Network: ABS-CBN
- Release: June 28 – November 26, 2010

Panahon Ko 'to!: Ang Game Show ng Buhay Ko (Lit. this is my time!: the game show of my life) is a Philippine television game show broadcast by ABS-CBN. Hosted by Luis Manzano and Billy Crawford, it aired on Hapontastic and Umaganda line up from June 28 to November 26, 2010, replacing Pinoy Big Brother: Teen Clash 2010 Uber and was replaced by Kapamilya Blockbusters.

== Format ==
Five teams of three players, one ranging from 13–19 years old, one ranging from the 20–45 years old, and one who is 46 years old or older, will answer a variety of pop culture questions from the 1960s to the 2000s. During the show's first four weeks, teams are composed of celebrities.

=== Ito ang Gusto Ko! ===
Five teams will play against each other in questions that are all about Filipino favorites. Questions will be presented in various types such as seen below:

Picture Quiz	A picture will slowly unveil with portal boxes.
Audio Quiz	A sample of a song or a vocal clip will reveal.
Phrase Quiz	A phrase will slowly unveil one letter at a time.
Video Quiz	A short video clip will reveal.
Iskrambol Quiz	Random words will drop completing a phrase.

A category is also given for each quiz as a hint to the answer. Each team will have three seconds to answer the question, and the first answer is their final answer. If a team answers wrong, they will be out for one round. When a team correctly answers two quizzes, they go to round two. The first three teams will advance.

=== Hot na Hot ===
The three winning teams will answer questions ranging from the 1960s to the 2000s. The initials of an answer will be given as a clue. Each correct answer is worth 10 points, while answering an "Extra Hot" question is worth 20 points. The first team to get 70 points will have a chance to play the jackpot round.

In most episodes, there's a special Extra Hot questions that are coming from P&G in commentation of the company's 75th anniversary were a team gets to get ₱7,500 for every correct answers about P&G's products.

=== Sinong Sikat? ===
One team member will voluntarily be chosen for the jackpot round. The team member must guess the celebrity hidden in seven stars. To get the stars off, questions must be answered in 60 seconds. Each star is worth P5,000. After 60 seconds, they must give the full name of the celebrity. If the guess is correct, the team wins P100,000.

== Awards ==
Year	Award	Category	Nominated artist / work	Result
2011	25th PMPC Star Awards for TV	Best Game Show	Panahon Ko 'to!	Won
2011	25th PMPC Star Awards for TV	Best Game Show Host	Luis Manzano and Billy Crawford	Nominated

== See also ==
- List of programs broadcast by ABS-CBN
