= 2010 Box Office Entertainment Awards =

Annual Philippine entertainment awards

- Date: June 10, 2010
- Location: RCBC Plaza, Makati

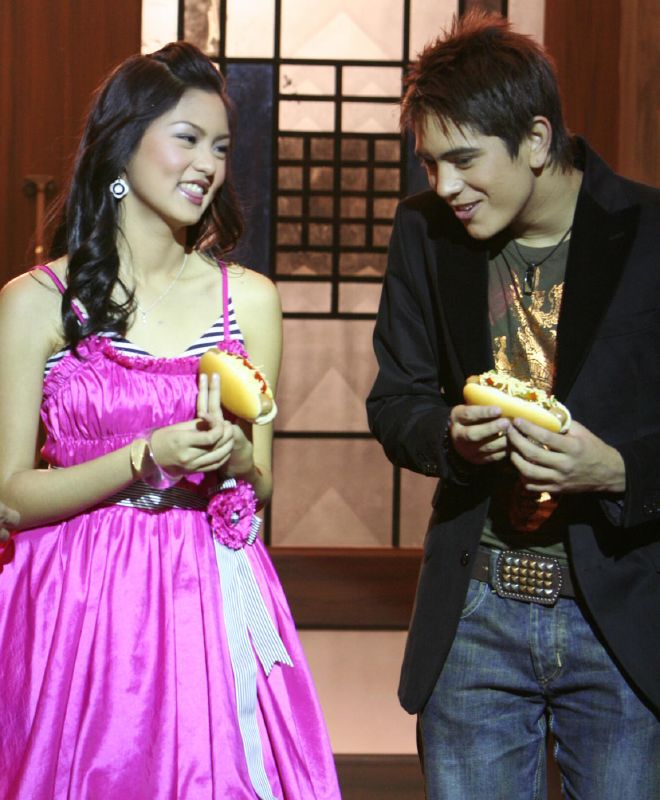
Kim Chiu (right) and Gerald Anderson (left), Prince and Princess of Philippine Movies & TV winners.

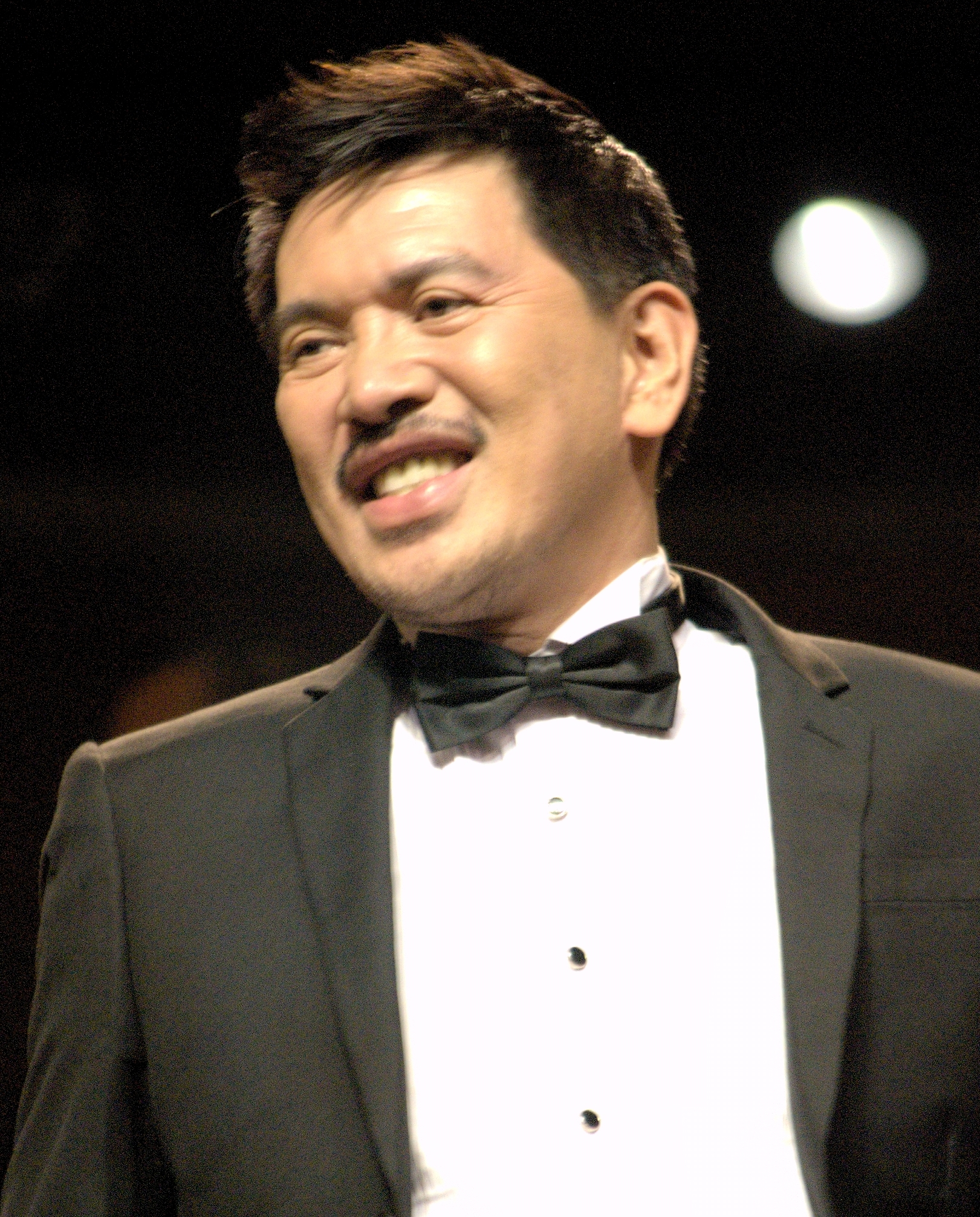
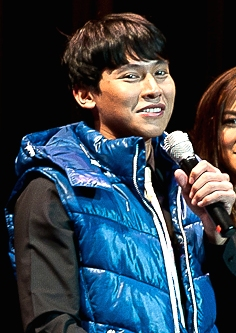
Brillante Mendoza (left) Global Achievement by a Filipino Artist winner (with Gina Pareno) and Enchong Dee (right), Most Promising Love Team winner (with Erich Gonzales).
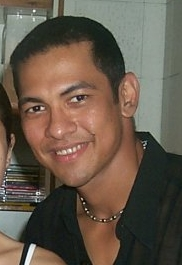
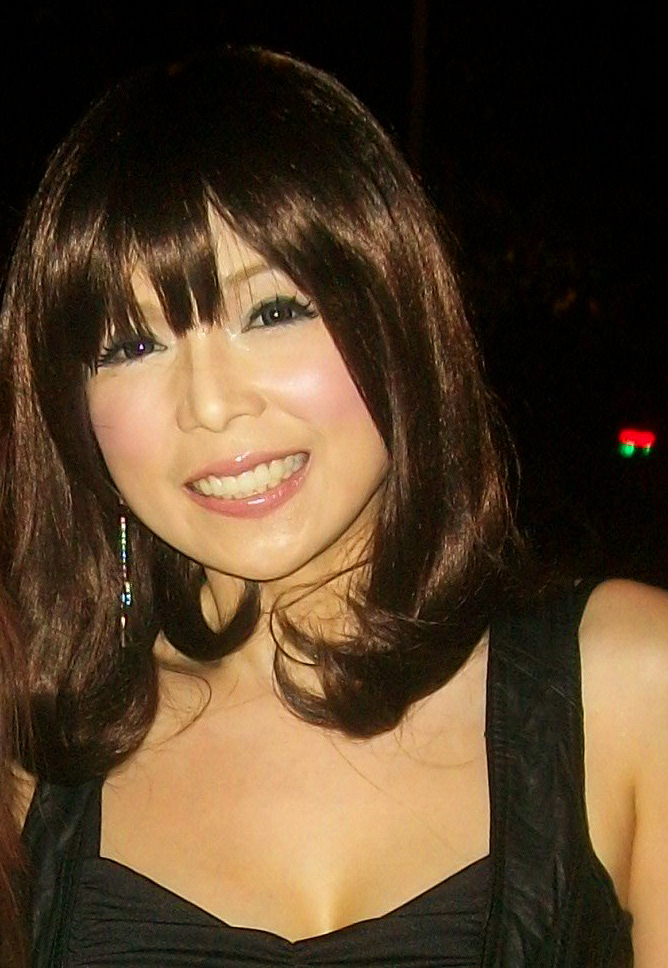
Gary Valenciano (left) and Nina (right), Male and Female Recording Artist of the Year winners.
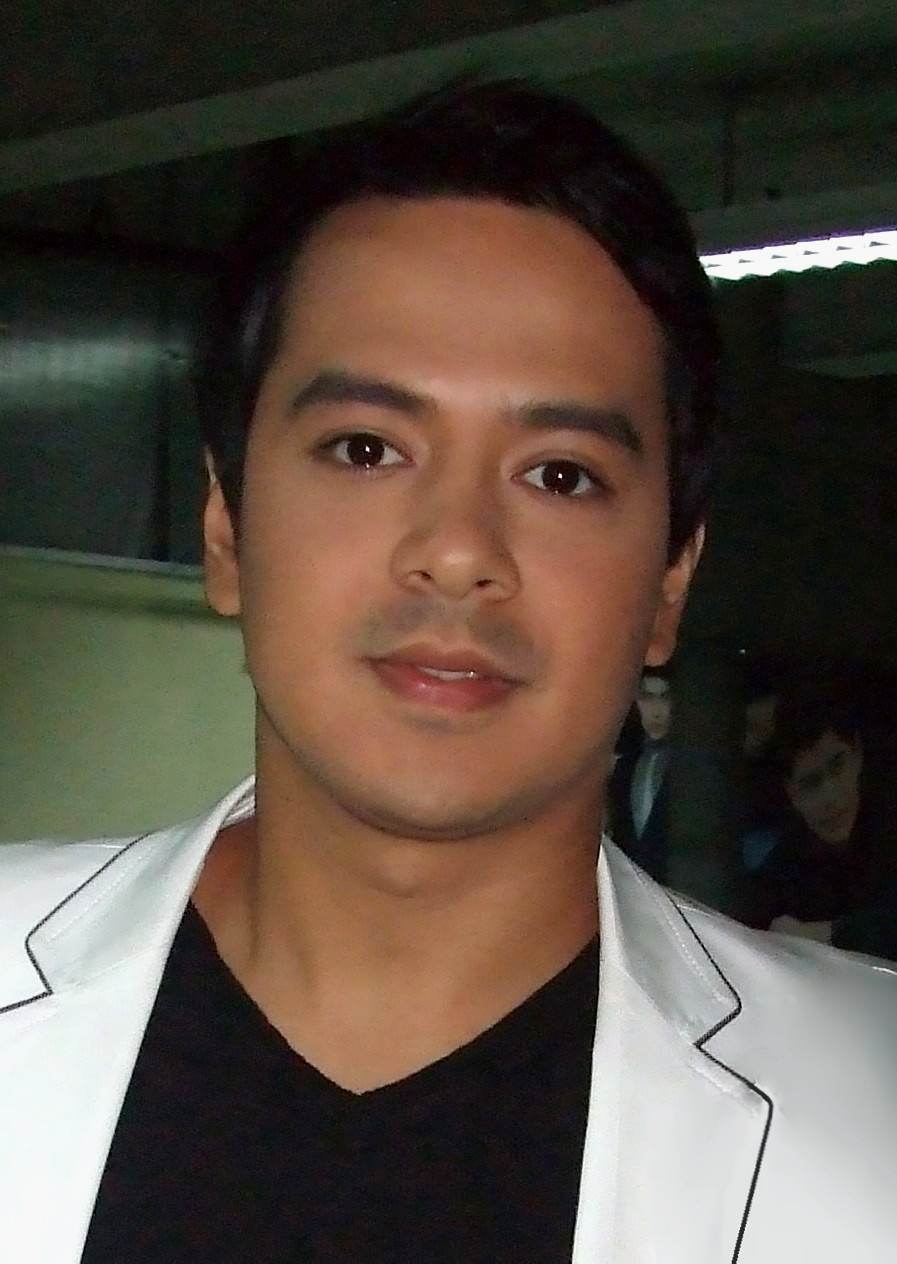
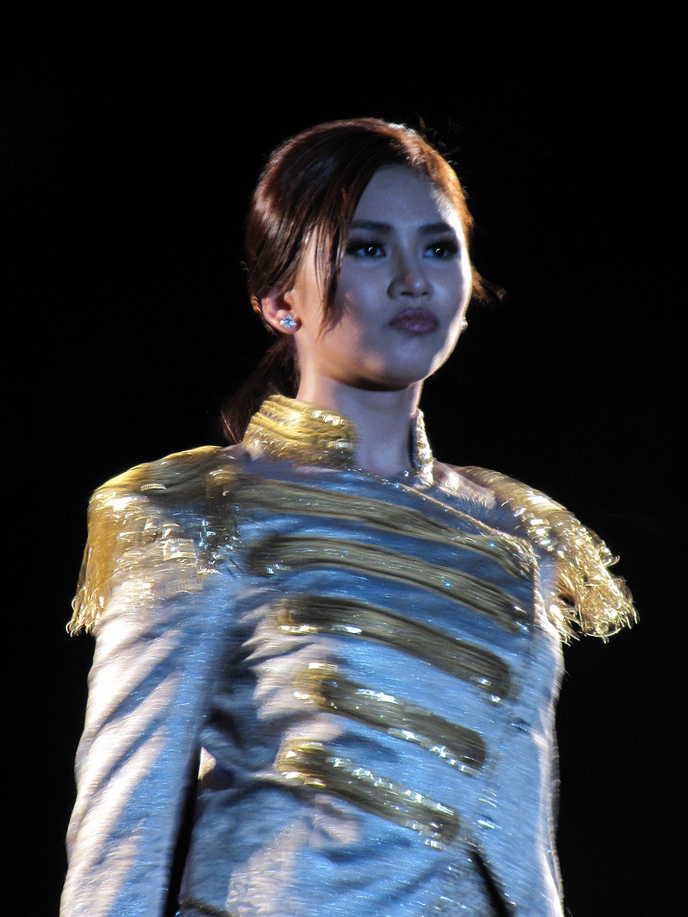
John Lloyd Cruz (left) and Sarah Geronimo (right), Box Office King and Queen winners.
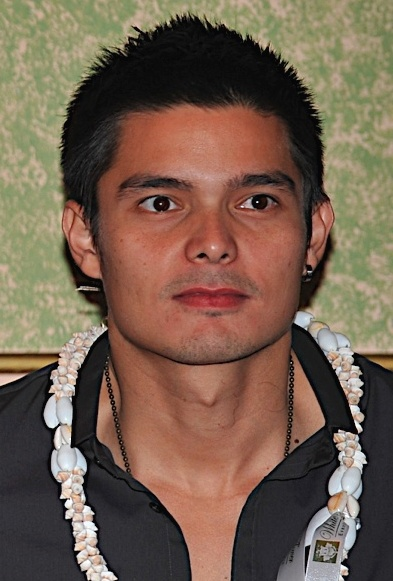
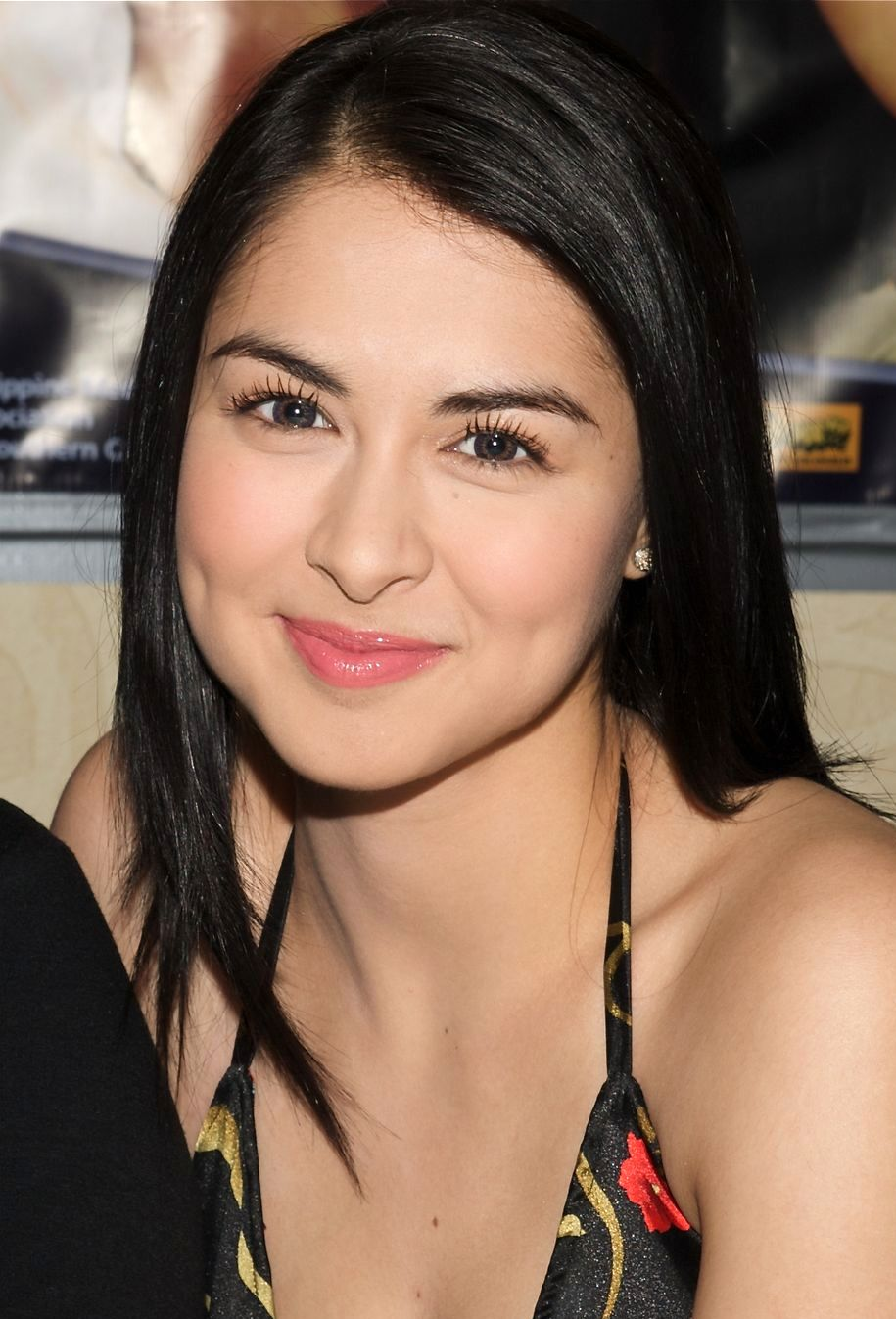
Dingdong Dantes (left) and Marian Rivera (right), Love Team of the Year winners.
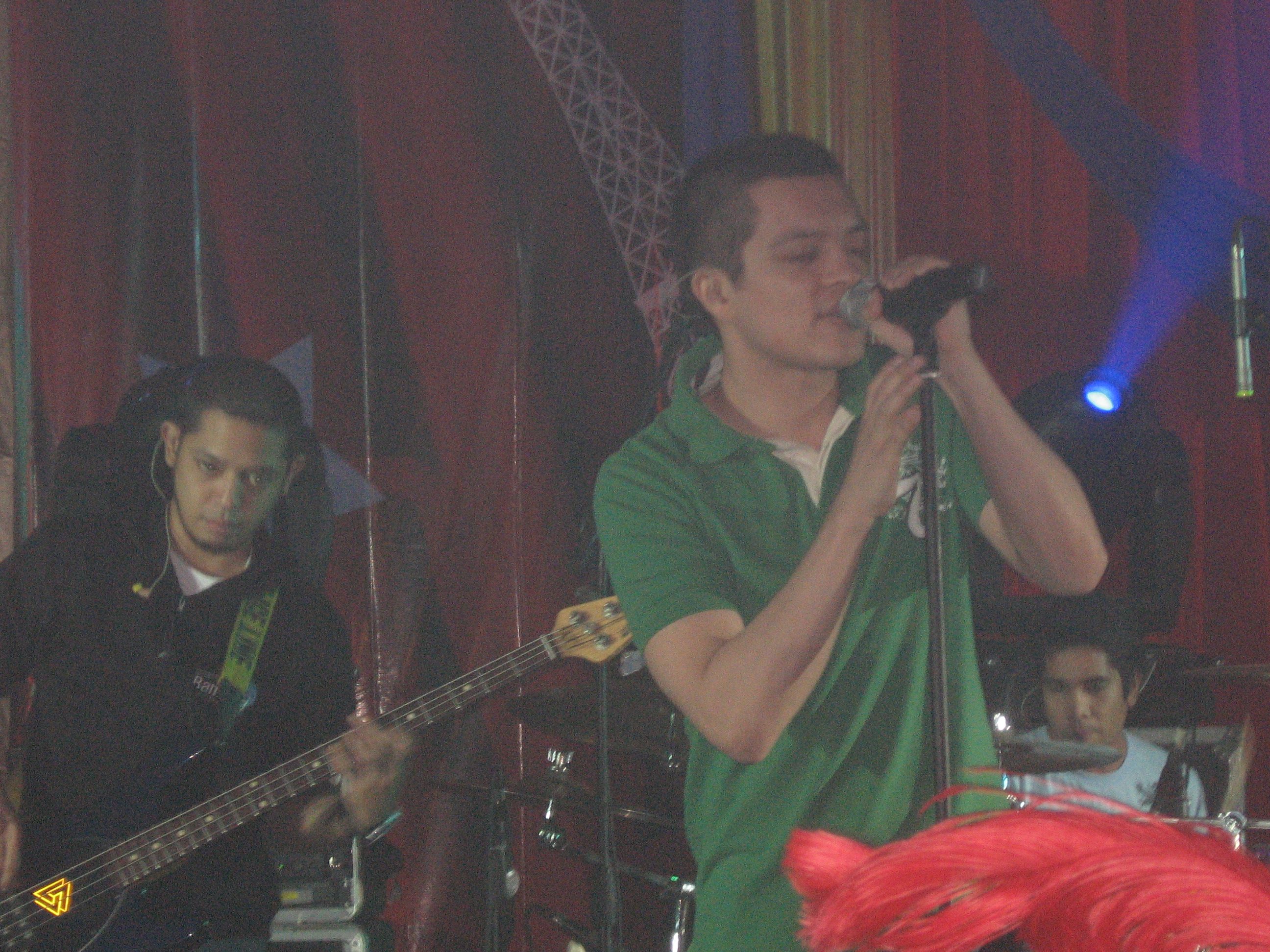
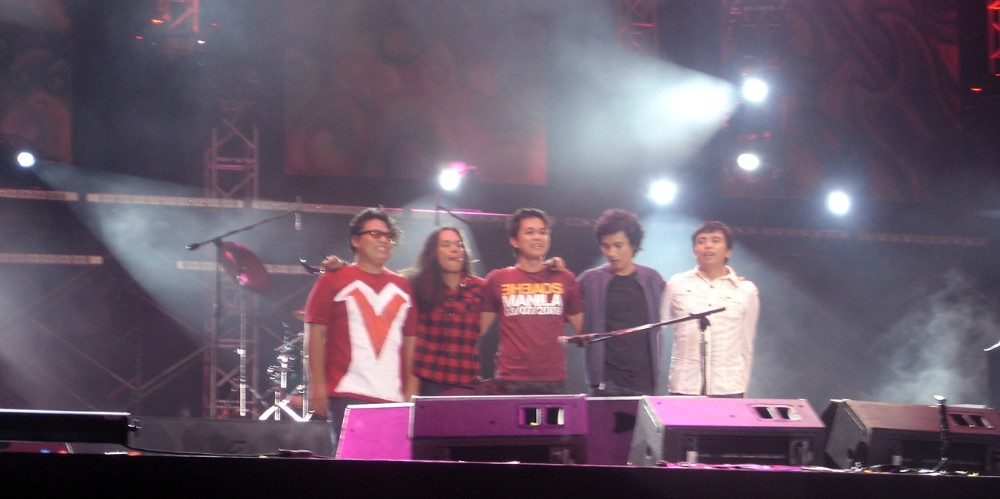
Bamboo (left) and Eraserheads (right), Group Recording Artist/Performer of the Year and Record Breaking Concert of the Year winners.

The 41st Guillermo Mendoza Memorial Scholarship Foundation Box Office Entertainment Awards (GMMSF-BOEA) is a part of the annual awards in the Philippines held on June 10, 2010. The award-giving body honors Filipino actors, actresses and other performers' commercial success, regardless of artistic merit, in the Philippine entertainment industry.

== Winners selection ==
The winners are chosen from the Top 10 Philippine films of 2009, top-rating shows in Philippine television, top recording awards received by singers, and top gross receipts of concerts and performances.

== Awards ceremony ==
On June 10, 2010, at Carlos P. Romulo Auditorium, RCBC Plaza, Ayala Avenue in Makati, Philippines, the 41st Box Office Entertainment Awards night was held.

=== Awards ===
==== Major awards ====
- Box Office King & Queen – John Lloyd Cruz and Sarah Geronimo (You Changed My Life)
- Male Concert Performer of the Year – Martin Nievera
- Female Concert Performer of the Year – Pops Fernandez
- Male Recording Artist of the Year – Gary Valenciano
- Female Recording Artist of the Year – Nina

==== Film and Television category ====
- Film Actors of the Year – John Lloyd Cruz and Luis Manzano (In My Life)
- Film Actress of the Year – Ms. Vilma Santos (In My Life)
- Film Producer of the Year – Star Cinema
- Film Director of the Year – Cathy Garcia Molina (You Changed My Life)
- Scriptwriters of the Year – Raymond Lee, Senedy Que, and Olivia Lamasan (In My Life)
- TV Program of the Year – May Bukas Pa (ABS-CBN)
- Princess of Philippine Movies & TV – Kim Chiu (Tayong Dalawa - ABS-CBN)
- Prince of Philippine Movies & TV – Gerald Anderson (Tayong Dalawa - ABS-CBN)
- Promising Male Box Office Star for Movies & TV – Coco Martin (ABS-CBN)
- Promising Female Box Office Star for Movies & TV – Angelica Panganiban (ABS-CBN)
- Love Team of the Year – Dingdong Dantes & Marian Rivera Endless Love (GMA-7)
- Promising Love Team of the Year – Enchong Dee & Erich Gonzales (ABS-CBN)
- TV Directors of the Year – Jojo Saguin and Jerome Pobocan (May Bukas Pa - ABS-CBN)

==== Music category ====
- Group Recording Artist/Performer of the Year – Bamboo
- Promising Male Recording/Performer of the Year – Jericho Rosales
- Promising Female Recording/Performer of the Year – Frencheska Farr
- Promising Group Recording/Artist of the Year – Pop Girls
- Novelty Singer of the Year – Willie Revillame
- Dance Group of the Year – ASAP Supahdance

=== Special awards ===
- Bert Marcelo Award – Pokwang
- Comedy Box Office King – Vic Sotto
- Comedy Box Office Queen – Ai-Ai delas Alas
- Global Achievement by a Filipino Artist – Brillante Mendoza
- Global Achievement by a Filipino Artist – Gina Pareño
- Record Breaking Concert of the Year – Eraserheads (Eraserheads: The Reunion Concert)

== Multiple awards ==
=== Individuals with multiple awards ===
The following individual names received two or more awards:

Awards	Name
2	John Lloyd Cruz

=== Companies with multiple awards ===
The following companies received two or more awards in the television category:

Awards	Company
7	ABS-CBN
