= Hating Kapatid (film) =

2010 comedy-drama film by Wenn V. Deramas

- Directed by: Wenn V. Deramas
- Written by: Mel Mendoza-del Rosario
- Produced by: Vincent G. Del Rosario III; Veronique D. Corpus
- Starring: Judy Ann Santos; Sarah Geronimo
- Cinematography: Elmer Despa
- Edited by: Marya Ignacio
- Music by: Vincent de Jesus
- Production company: Viva Films
- Distributed by: Viva Films
- Release date: July 21, 2010
- Running time: 109 minutes
- Country: Philippines
- Language: Filipino
- Box office: ₱82 million

Hating Kapatid (transl. Sibling Share) is a 2010 Filipino comedy-drama film directed by Wenn V. Deramas and written by Mel Mendoza-del Rosario. Starring Judy Ann Santos and Sarah Geronimo, the story follows two sisters, Rica and Cecil, and how the return of their Overseas Filipino Worker parents changes their sibling relationship.

Produced and distributed by Viva Films, the film was theatrically released on July 21, 2010.

== Plot summary ==
Rica has been very protective of her sister Cecil, even giving up her one true love, Bong, for her sister's future. After a freak accident 10 years ago at their little party store for fireworks, as they grow up under the care of their grandmother, their parents come back. As they come back, the girls are all grown up, and Rica fears that her younger sister, Cecil, will no longer need her to look after her. Cecil later on meets and later falls in love with Edzel.

== Cast ==
=== Main cast ===
- Judy Ann Santos as Rica Salvador
- Sarah Geronimo as Cecil/Cecilia Maria Salvador
- JC De Vera as Bong
- Luis Manzano as Edzel

=== Supporting cast ===
- Vice Ganda as Beauty
- Gina Pareno as Lola Gerty/Amor
- Cherry Pie Picache as Mother of Rica, Cecil & Joseph
- Tonton Gutierrez as Father of Rica, Cecil & Joseph
- DJ Durano as Noel Salvador, Cousin of Rica, Cecil & Joseph
- Joseph Andre Garcia as Joseph Salvador
- Mariel Pamintuan as Young Rica
- Angel Sy as Young Cecil
- Marjorie Joven as 3 Year Old Cecil
- Ricky Rivero as Doctor
- Joy Viado† as Madam Alahera
- Tess Antonio as Candy
- Cacil
- Atak as Store Manager
- Empoy Marquez

== Reception ==
=== Box-office ===
The film opened with a ₱11 million gross. The film earned P 82 million in its entire run.

=== International screenings ===
The film had international screenings in select cities in the United States such as San Francisco, CA, San Diego, CA, New York City, NY, and Honolulu, HI. Also in countries such as Austria, Switzerland, Spain, Dubai, Guam, and Canada.
