= Petrang Kabayo =

- Theatrical movie poster
- Directed by: Wenn V. Deramas
- Screenplay by: Mel Mendoza-Del Rosario; Wenn V. Deramas
- Story by: Mel Mendoza-Del Rosario
- Based on: Petrang Kabayo by Pablo S. Gomez; Petrang Kabayo at ang Pilyang Kuting by Luciano B. Carlos
- Produced by: Vic Del Rosario Jr.
- Starring: Vice Ganda
- Cinematography: Elmer Despa
- Edited by: Marya Ignacio
- Music by: Vince de Jesus
- Production company: Viva Films
- Distributed by: Viva Films
- Release date: October 13, 2010
- Running time: 106 minutes
- Country: Philippines
- Languages: Filipino; English
- Box office: ₱115.4 million (2010) (US$2.56 million)

Petrang Kabayo (lit. 'Petra the Horse') is a 2010 Filipino fantasy comedy-drama film produced and released by Viva Films. The film was directed by Wenn V. Deramas and stars comedian like Vice Ganda and his husband John Vincent Garaza. It is a remake of Petrang Kabayo at Ang Pilyang Kuting in 1988.

Although receiving negative reviews from critics, the film was a box office success earning ₱115.4 million (2010) (US$2.56 million) in its theatrical run.

== Plot ==
Peter Kasimsiman (Vice Ganda), adopted by the wealthy and kind-hearted Doña Biday, finds refuge and privilege after enduring years of abuse from his biological father Mang Poldo (John Arcilla) due to his sexual orientation. However, over time, the wealth and status he once appreciated begin to corrupt him. Following Doña Biday's death, Peter's behavior becomes increasingly arrogant and abusive, mistreating his servants, employees, friends, and even the family's prized horses.

After the death of one of Peter's overworked horses, Diobayo, the goddess of horses, curses him. Whenever Peter acts out of anger or does something malicious, he transforms into a horse. Stripped of his human form, Peter is forced to experience the world through the eyes of an animal, enduring the same mistreatment he once inflicted on others.

During one of his transformations, Peter is found by his former employee, Erickson, who, unaware of the curse, names the horse Petra and uses her to pull his calesa. Erickson treats Petra with care and respect. Peter, struggling to overcome his past, can only revert to his human form by performing good deeds or showing kindness.

As Peter reflects on his life and actions, he begins to mend his ways, showing humility and reconciling with his repentant father. Realizing he can save his estate from bankruptcy by winning a crucial horse race, Peter asks Diobayo to transform him back into a horse one last time. He believes that winning the race will restore his family’s legacy and secure their future.

In a surprising twist after the race, Erickson, overcome with excitement, kisses Petra. To both their shock, Petra transforms back into Peter, revealing his true identity right before Erickson's eyes.

== Cast and characters ==
=== Main cast ===
- Vice Ganda as Peter Kasimsiman/Pedro/Petra (voice) - Poldo's son/Doña Biday's adoptive son

=== Supporting cast ===
- Luis Manzano as Erickson Santos
- Abby Bautista as Pauline - Peter's half-sister/Poldo's daughter
- Gloria Romero as Lola Idang - Erikson and Dickson's grandmother
- Sam Pinto as Samantha - Maita's daughter
- Candy Pangilinan as Maita
- Eagle Riggs as Diobayo - son of Silveria, goddess of horses
- DJ Durano as Dickson Santos - Erikson's cousin

=== Recurring cast ===
- Joy Viado† as Lina - Peter's security
- Tom Rodriguez as Chito
- John Arcilla as Mang Poldo - Peter and Pauline's father
- Ricky Rivero† as Geronino
- Celine Lim as Anna
- Jojit Lorenzo as Atty. Manalo

=== Special participation ===
- Anne Curtis as Kalesa Passenger
- Eugene Domingo as Doña Biday Kasimsiman - Peter's adoptive mother
- Gladys Reyes as Pregnant Kalesa Passenger
- John Lapus as Ms. Woo, Filipino/Chinese Matron Judy Ann Santos
- Dennis Padilla as Marjoroi
- Makisig Morales as Young Peter/Pedro
- Jason Francisco as Melony - Mang Inasal's Waiter
- Nadine Lustre as Dina Helena - Peter's executive assistant

== Home video release ==
Petrang Kabayo was released on DVD and VCD on December 15, 2010, by Viva Video.
