= Moron 5 and the Crying Lady =

2012 Filipino comedy film

- Theatrical movie poster
- Directed by: Wenn V. Deramas
- Written by: Mel Mendoza-Del Rosario; Wenn V. Deramas
- Produced by: Vic R. del Rosario Jr.; Raam Punjabi
- Starring: Luis Manzano; Billy Crawford; Marvin Agustin; DJ Durano; Mart Escudero; John Lapus
- Cinematography: Elmer Despa
- Edited by: Marya Ignacio
- Music by: Jessie Lasaten
- Production companies: Viva Films; MVP Pictures
- Distributed by: Viva Films
- Release date: April 7, 2012
- Running time: 105 minutes
- Country: Philippines
- Languages: Filipino; English
- Box office: ₱64,642,363.00

Moron 5 and the Crying Lady is a 2012 Filipino comedy film directed by Wenn V. Deramas, starring Luis Manzano, DJ Durano, Martin Escudero, Billy Crawford, Marvin Agustin, and John Lapus. It was released on April 7, 2012, and was distributed by Viva Films. The title “Moron 5” is a play on the name of the American pop rock band, Maroon 5. A sequel, Moron 5.2: The Transformation, was released on November 5, 2014.

It tells the story of five friends who are depicted to be stupid. They cross paths with a woman (Lapus) who has a grudge against them, so much that the woman, will do anything to bring them down. They are able to track down Becky's lair in an old mansion wherein she has a bodyguard named Carding. Unbeknownst to the five friends, Becky is disguising as the owner, maid, female child and the houseboy. One night, while searching for food, one of their friends crossed paths with Becky (disguising as a maid) and Carding having sweet moments in the kitchen. After the couple went upstairs, Carding initiated a wild night with Becky inside the bedroom. To her distress, Becky accidentally revealed herself as the houseboy known to Carding leading her to kill him and hide him behind the sheets.

== Plot ==
Friends Albert (Luis Manzano), Isaac (Billy Crawford), Mozart "Mo" (DJ Durano), Michaelangelo "Mike" (Martin Escudero) and Aristotle "Aris" (Marvin Agustin) were used to living normal lives until careerwoman Beckie Pamintuan (John Lapus) accused them of killing her father and ruin everything for them after the 5 of them spills the truth about her husband on their wedding making him realized that Becky was gay causing him to die from faint. The Moron 5 are more than sure of their innocence but they can't find any argument on how to prove it. Spending three years in prison trying different attempts to get out, they finally escaped. They followed Beckie and tried to understand why she's fighting so hard to have them imprisoned when they know that what happened three years ago was a frame-up. An opportunity came when Beckie's driver got fired for having an affair with her maid and Albert volunteered to apply to replace him. He infiltrated the Pamintuan Residence and together with his friends, they've gathered information about the family yet to them, it isn't making any sense at all especially Becky's hatred to the five of them. Why is Beckie fighting so hard to have them suffer? The Moron 5 will try harder to know and hopefully understand what's really going on although little did they know that by doing so, everything that they hold dear might be at risk.

== Cast ==
- Luis Manzano as Albert Macapagal
- Billy Crawford as Isaac Estrada
- Marvin Agustin as Aristotle Ramos
- DJ Durano as Mozart Twister Aquino
- Mart Escudero as Michael Angelo Marcos
- John Lapus as Beckie Pamintuan
- Roden Araneta† as Albert's father
- Carlos Agassi as Alding Cabalda (Bully 1)
- German Moreno† as Mr. Estrella Isaac's father
- Dennis Padilla as Mr. Marcos Michael's father
- Arlene Muhlach as Isaac's mother
- Deborah Sun as Mozart's mother
- Jon Santos as Albert's mother
- Roldan Aquino† as Mr. Aquino Mozart's father
- Joy Viado† as Filomena Gaborone (Aristotle's aunt)
- Flora Gasser† as Albert's yaya
- Eagle Riggs as Principal
- Christopher Roxas as Elmer Despa (Bully 2)
- Andrew Wolfe as Carding
- Tess Antonio as Teacher 1
- Dang Cruz as Teacher 2
- Aki Torio as Issac's brother
- Eri Neeman as Ricardo Salvador (Bully 3)
- Nikki Gil as Bank Teller (Cameo)
- Jennylyn Mercado as Prison Visitor (Cameo)
- Ya Chang as Hiroshi (Beckie's fiancée)
- Mark Andrew Felix as Young Albert
- Marco Barillo as Young Isaac
- Carlos Dala as Young Aristotle
- Kevin Kier Remo as Young Mozart
- Martin Luigie Venegas as Young Mike
- Kyle Ang as Young Beckie
- Ate Glow as Gloria Macapagal-Arroyo (inmate)

== Sequel ==
A sequel, Moron 5.2: The Transformation, was released on November 5, 2014. All lead stars but one reprised their roles in the original movie. Matteo Guidicelli joined the cast as Michael Angelo, replacing Martin Escudero. In an interview from Viva Entertainment YouTube Video, Guidicelli stressed that the character's (previously played by Escudero) face was accidentally burnt. His face was surgically restored in the story, following Guidicelli's face. The theatrical release was on November 5, 2014.

== Filming ==
The filming began in December 2011 and wrapped up in January 2012.
