= Luis Manzano =

Filipino actor and host (born 1981)

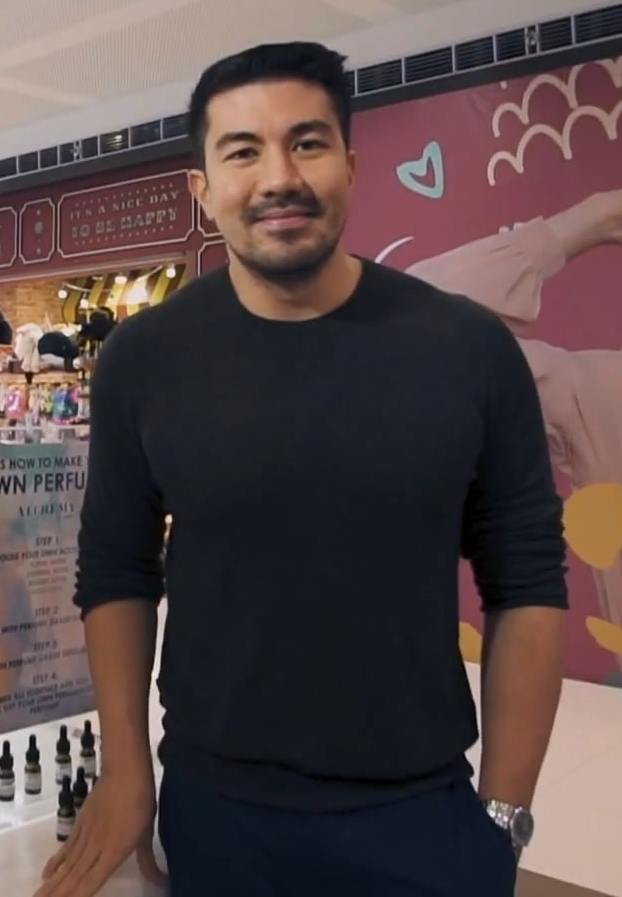
- Manzano in 2019
- Born: Luis Philippe Santos Manzano; April 21, 1981 (age 45); San Juan, Metro Manila, Philippines
- Other name: Lucky
- Education: De La Salle–College of Saint Benilde (BS)
- Occupations: Actor; comedian; television host; VJ; model
- Years active: 2002–present
- Agent(s): Viva Artists Agency (2005–present)
- Political party: Nacionalista
- Spouse: Jessy Mendiola (m. 2021)
- Children: 1
- Parents: Edu Manzano (biological father); Vilma Santos (mother); Ralph Recto (stepfather)
- Relatives: Ryan Recto (maternal half-brother); Diego Aspiras (paternal half-brother)

Luis Philippe Santos Manzano (Tagalog pronunciation: [manˈsanɔ]; born April 21, 1981), also known by his nickname Lucky, is a Filipino actor, comedian and television host. He is the son of actors Edu Manzano and Vilma Santos. He is widely recognized for hosting various game and talent competition television programs aired by ABS-CBN, such as Pilipinas Got Talent (2010–2016), Kapamilya, Deal or No Deal (2012–2016, 2026–present), Minute to Win It (2013–2019), The Voice of the Philippines (2014), Family Feud (2016–2017), the Philippine version of I Can See Your Voice (2017–2024), Pinoy Big Brother (2006–2008, 2025–2026), and for his role in the 2009 film In My Life as Mark Salvacion.

In 2025, Manzano ran for Vice Governor of Batangas in tandem with his mother, but lost.

== Early life ==
Luis Philippe Santos Manzano is the only child of Vilma Santos and Edu Manzano. His stepfather is Senator Ralph Recto, husband of his mother. Manzano has a maternal half-brother, Ryan Christian Recto, and three paternal half-siblings, Addie, Enzo and Diego Aspiras. His cousin is Andi Manzano, a former VJ for MTV Philippines, and also a radio DJ for Magic 89.9 FM.

Manzano studied at Colegio San Agustin - Makati for high school and at De La Salle–College of Saint Benilde in Malate, Manila, majoring in Hotel and Restaurant Institution Management.

== Entertainment career ==
Manzano started his career as an image model for clothing brand, 'Human'. He later pursued a television host and acting career. Manzano began his professional trajectory by working as a VJ for the renowned music channel, Myx, with Iya Villania. He later served as a host and performer on the television veriety show ASAP in 2003, and on the reality show Star Circle Quest in 2004. Following his hosting engagements, Manzano transitioned into acting, portraying the roles of Luigi in the sitcom series Bora and Pablo in the drama Kampanerang Kuba, both of which aired in 2005. In addition to his television work, Manzano was also part of the main cast in several films in consecutive years, including All About Love as Wesley (2006), Ang Cute ng Ina Mo! as Val Quizon (2007), In My Life as Mark Salvacion (2009), Hating Kapatid as Edzel (2010), and Petrang Kabayo as Erickson Santos (2010). Manzano starred in the comedy film Moron 5 and the Crying Lady in 2012 and its sequel in 2014, as well as in This Guy's in Love with U Mare! as Mike, also in 2012.

Manzano returned to hosting in 2007 through the talk show Entertainment Live, alongside Toni Gonzaga, Mariel Rodriguez, and Bianca Gonzalez. That same year, Manzano also co-hosted the reality game show Pinoy Big Brother: Teen Edition Plus with them. In 2010, he hosted the game show Panahon Ko 'To!: Ang Game Show ng Buhay Ko with Billy Crawford. He also co-hosted the reality talent competition Pilipinas Got Talent with Crawford from 2010 to 2016. In 2011, Manzano starred in the sketch comedy show Laugh Out Loud alongside Alodia Gosiengfiao. Manzano replaced Kris Aquino as host of the game show Kapamilya, Deal or No Deal from 2012 to 2016 and since 2026. In the same year, Manzano co-hosted the musical variety show Sarah G Live with Sarah Geronimo. He also hosted the game show Minute to Win It from 2013 to 2019.

From 2014 to 2015, Manzano served as host for both The Voice Kids and The Voice of the Philippines. Manzano replaced Billy Crawford as host of the game show Celebrity Playtime, which aired from 2015 to 2016. He then succeeded his father, Edu Manzano, as host of Family Feud from 2016 to 2017, before being replaced by Dingdong Dantes in 2022. Manzano was the original host of the talent competition The Voice Teens in 2017. In 2019, he hosted the interactive reality competition World of Dance Philippines alongside Pia Wurtzbach.

Manzano later replaced Billy Crawford as host of Season 3 of the singing and impersonation competition Your Face Sounds Familiar. He also headlined the variety show It's Your Lucky Day. As of 2024, Manzano serves as the host of the game show Rainbow Rumble. In October 2025, Manzano returned to hosting Pinoy Big Brother after seventeen years through Pinoy Big Brother: Celebrity Collab Edition 2.0.

== Political career ==
Manzano ran for vice governor of Batangas in the 2025 local elections, but lost to outgoing governor Hermilando Mandanas. In December 2025, Manzano expressed he is no longer interested in pursuing a government position.

== Personal life ==
Manzano owns a taxi company, LBR Transport Inc. Manzano is also a member of Tau Gamma Phi, a fraternity established in the Philippines.

Before dating actress Jessy Mendiola in June 2016, he dated several other actresses including Nancy Castiglione, Anne Curtis, Jennylyn Mercado, and Angel Locsin. Manzano became engaged to Mendiola on December 12, 2020, and were married on February 21, 2021, in a civil wedding officiated by Lipa City Mayor Eric Africa at The Farm in San Benito (Barangay Tipakan Lipa, Batangas).

On August 11, 2022, the couple announced that they were expecting their first child. Their daughter, Isabella Rose Tawile "Peanut" Manzano was born on December 29, 2022.

Manzano and Mendiola's church wedding was officiated by Jesuit priest Carmelo Caluag II in a Coron, Palawan church and beach on February 15, 2024. Present were Edu Manzano, Vilma Santos, and the bride's parents Roger Tawile and Judith Mendiola, with their daughter Rosie as the "little bride."

In May 2024, Manzano was cleared of cancer after medical tests including biopsy of his head lump.

== Filmography ==
=== Film ===
Year	Film	Role	Notes
2006	All About Love	Wesley	"Kalesa" (also debut film)
2007	Ang Cute ng Ina Mo	Val Quizon	
2009	In My Life	Mark Salvacion	
2010	Hating Kapatid	Edzel	
2010	Petrang Kabayo	Erickson Santos	
2011	Who's That Girl?	John Eduque Jr.	
2011	The Unkabogable Praybeyt Benjamin	Ericson	Cameo
2012	Moron 5 and the Crying Lady	Albert Macapagal	
2012	This Guy's in Love with U Mare!	Mike	
2012	Sisterakas	Waiter	Cameo
2013	Girl, Boy, Bakla, Tomboy	Priest	Cameo
2014	Starting Over Again	Professor	Cameo
2014	Moron 5.2: The Transformation	Albert Macapagal	
2014	The Amazing Praybeyt Benjamin	Young Ben	Cameo
2018	The Girl in the Orange Dress	Eric Dela Cruz	Special participation

=== Television ===
Year	Title	Role
2002–2013	My Myx	VJ
2002–2013	Myx Daily Top 10	VJ
2002–2013	Myx Mobile Top Picks	VJ
2002–2013	Pop Myx	VJ
2002–2009	OPM Myx	VJ
2003–present	ASAP	Host (performer)
2004	Star Circle Quest	Himself (host)
2005	Bora	Luigi
2005	Qpids	Himself (host)
2005	Kampanerang Kuba	Pablo
2006	Your Song Presents: I'll Never Get Over You, Gettin' Over Me	Justin
2006	Komiks Presents: Paa ni Isabella	John
2006	Pinoy Big Brother: Celebrity Edition 1	Host
2006	Crazy for You	Wacky
2007	Your Song Presents: If We Fall in Love	
2007	Your Song Presents: Ikaw	Louie
2007	Rounin	Juris
2007	Your Song Presents: Ikaw	Abel / Adam
2007	Maalaala Mo Kaya: Larawan	Rodel
2008	Entertainment Live	Himself (host)
2008	Dyosa	Kulas
2008	Pinoy Big Brother: Teen Edition Plus	Himself (host)
2009	Komiks Presents: Flash Bomba	Flash Bomba / Roldan Legaspi
2009	Maalaala Mo Kaya: Videoke	Rey
2009–2013	Pinoy Myx	VJ
2010	Your Song Presents: My Last Romance	Nico Suarez
2010	Panahon Ko 'to!: Ang Game Show ng Buhay Ko	Himself (host) with Billy Crawford
2010	Wansapanataym Presents: Kokak	Leo
2010–2013; 2016	Pilipinas Got Talent	Himself (host)
2011	Laugh Out Loud	Himself (host) with Alodia Gosiengfiao
2012–2013; 2015–2016; 2026–present	Kapamilya, Deal or No Deal	Himself (host)
2012	Sarah G. Live	Himself (host)
2012	Be Careful With My Heart	James Luis Ventura
2013–2014; 2016–2017; 2019	Minute to Win It	Himself (host)
2014–2016	The Voice Kids	Himself (host)
2014–2016	The Voice of the Philippines	Himself (host)
2015–2016	Celebrity Playtime	Himself (host) (episode 8 onwards, replacing Billy Crawford)
2016–2017	Family Feud	Himself (host)
2017	The Voice Teens	Himself (host)
2017	It's Showtime	Himself (host)
2017–2024	I Can See Your Voice	Himself (host)
2019	World of Dance Philippines	Himself (host)
2019–2020	Home Sweetie Home: Extra Sweet	Pip
2019–2020	Your Moment	Himself (host)
2020	The Voice Teens	Himself (host)
2021	Your Face Sounds Familiar	Himself (host)
2021–present	Luis Listens	Himself (host)
2023	It's Your Lucky Day	Himself (host)
2024	Can't Buy Me Love	Restaurant waiter
2024–2026	Rainbow Rumble	Himself (host)
2025–2026	Pinoy Big Brother: Celebrity Collab Edition 2.0	Himself (host)

== Awards and nominations ==
Year	Award	Category	Work	Result
2003	17th PMPC Star Awards for TV	Best New Male TV Personality	ASAP	Won
2004	PMPC Star Awards for TV	Best Talent-Search Program Host	Star Circle Quest Kids & Teens (with Jodi Sta. Maria)	Won
2005	PMPC Star Awards for TV	Best Talent-Search Program Host	Star Circle National Teen Quest (with Jodi Sta. Maria)	Won
2006	20th PMPC Star Awards for TV	Best Male TV Host	ASAP '06	Won
2007	23rd PMPC Star Awards for Movies	New Movie Actor of the Year	All About Love	Nominated
2008	24th PMPC Star Awards for Movies	Movie Supporting Actor of the Year	Ang Cute Ng Ina Mo	Nominated
2008	PMPC Star Awards for TV	Male Star Of The Night	—N/a	Won
2009	23rd PMPC Star Awards for TV	Best Male TV Host	ASAP '09	Won
2010	GAWAD Tanglaw	Best Supporting Actor	In My Life	Won
2010	25th PMPC Star Awards for Movies	Movie Supporting Actor of the Year	In My Life	Won
2010	41st Box Office Entertainment Awards	Film Actor of the Year (with John Lloyd Cruz)	In My Life	Won
2011	25th PMPC Star Awards for TV	Best Talent Search Program Hosts (with Billy Crawford)	Pilipinas Got Talent	Won
2011	25th PMPC Star Awards for TV	Best Game Show Host	Panahon Ko 'To (with Billy Crawford)	Nominated
2011	25th PMPC Star Awards for TV	Best Male Showbiz-Oriented Show Host	E-Live	Won
2011	25th PMPC Star Awards for TV	Best Male TV Host	ASAP Rocks	Nominated
2011	25th PMPC Star Awards for TV	Male Sexiest of the Night	—N/a	Won
2011	Yahoo! OMG! Awards	Favorite Male TV Host	Pilipinas Got Talent	Won
2013	GMMSF Box-Office Entertainment Awards	Prince of Philippine Movies	This Guy's in Love with U Mare!	Won
2014	30th PMPC Star Awards for Movies	Darling of the Press	—N/a	Nominated
2015	PMPC Star Awards for TV	Best Game Show Host	Kapamilya, Deal or No Deal	Won
2016	PMPC Star Awards for TV	Best Male TV Host	ASAP	Won
2016	PMPC Star Awards for TV	Best Talent Search Program Host	The Voice Kids (season 3) with Robi Domingo & Kim Chiu	Won
2017	PMPC Star Awards For Movies	Darling of the Press	—N/a	Won
