= In My Life (2009 film) =

2009 drama film by Olivia M. Lamasan

- Theatrical movie poster
- Directed by: Olivia M. Lamasan
- Screenplay by: Senedy Que; Raymond Lee; Olivia M. Lamasan
- Story by: Raymond Lee; Olivia M. Lamasan
- Produced by: Charo Santos-Concio; Malou N. Santos; Tess V. Fuentes; Marizel S. Martinez
- Starring: Vilma Santos-Recto; Luis Manzano; John Lloyd Cruz
- Cinematography: Charlie S. Peralta
- Edited by: Marya Ignacio
- Music by: Nonong Buencamino
- Production company: Star Cinema
- Distributed by: ABS-CBN Film Productions
- Release date: September 16, 2009
- Running time: 120 minutes
- Country: Philippines
- Language: Filipino
- Box office: ₱140.5 million

In My Life is a 2009 Philippine drama film directed by Olivia M. Lamasan from a story and screenplay she co-wrote with Raymond Lee and Senedy Que. The film stars real-life mother and son, Vilma Santos-Recto and Luis Manzano, and John Lloyd Cruz, with the supporting cast includes Tirso Cruz III, Dimples Romana, Vice Ganda, and Nonie and Shamaine Buencamino.

Produced and distributed by Star Cinema, the film was theatrically released on September 16, 2009.

== Plot ==
Shirley Templo is a ruthless woman. Many people deal with her strong attitude only for fear of her cold stare or her outbursts. She works as a librarian in a school and lives in a compound owned by her ex-husband, Benito Salvacion. Many of the Salvacion family members who live near the compound, even including her eldest daughter, Dang, plead with her to sell it to make a profit and move to a more suitable living area. Hard-headed as she is, Shirley refuses and feels betrayed by her two daughters, Dang and Cherry, for even siding with their father, who left them nearly fifteen years ago. Even more upset, she finds out that Dang plans to emigrate to Australia. Alone in the Philippines, Shirley decides to move to New York City with her youngest and only son, Mark, who is gay. Mark is unaware, however, that this supposed vacation of his mother is actually a permanent visit.

Upon her arrival in the States, Shirley is picked up at the airport by Noel Villanueva. Thinking he was only hired to help, she rudely offers him payment for his services, but he declines. As she walks around the apartment, she notices pictures of Mark and Noel being affectionate toward each other. She then realizes that Noel is actually Mark's new boyfriend. Although she has been aware of Mark's homosexuality since his high school years, she gives Noel plenty of trouble and hard times. The story reflects how Shirley changes her attitudes and views about two men who become a big part of her life, and how she accepts the reality that has been presented to her. Unfortunately, unforeseen tragedies occur, and a rift between Shirley and Noel arises. But as she understands Mark's reasons for having her be around Noel all this time, she resolves her issues with him and soon embraces him as a member of her family.

== Cast ==
=== Main cast ===
- Vilma Santos-Recto as Shirley Templo: A ruthless librarian who moves to New York with her son. Though born in the United States (due to her American mother), she hasn't stepped onto American soil.
- Luis Manzano as Mark Salvacion: Shirley's youngest gay son.
- John Lloyd Cruz as Noel Villanueva: Mark's lover.

=== Supporting cast ===
- Vice Ganda as Hillary: Mark and Noel's fellow Filipino friend florist in New York.
- Nikki Valdez as Mia: Mark and Noel's fellow Filipino friend in New York.
- Dimples Romana as Andrea "Dang" Salvacion, Shirley's oldest daughter
- Rafael Rosell as Vince
- Tirso Cruz III as Benito Salvacion: Shirley's ex-husband
- Paw Diaz as Cherry Salvacion, Shirley's younger daughter
- Nonie Buencamino as Mr. Villanueva: Noel's father
- Shamaine Buencamino as Mrs. Villanueva: Noel's mother, who has breast cancer
- Arnold Reyes as Albert Salvacion, Dang's husband
- Aaron Junatas as Boylet Salvacion: Dang's oldest son and Shirley's grandson
- Cha-Cha Cañete as Kat Kat Salvacion: Dang's younger daughter and Shirley's granddaughter
- Kakai Bautista as Millet
- William Rothlein as Elai: A bagel shop owner
- Marshall Factora as Uncle Ed, Noel's owner residence and Pamela's godfather

== Production ==
Initially, Manzano turned down the role of Mark Salvacion and admitted he was uncomfortable with the intimate scenes between the two male characters. He accepted the role after reading the script and understanding the character. His mother and co-star Vilma Santos, meanwhile, made it clear that she did not influence Manzano's decision.

John Lloyd Cruz stated that he had no problem with the gay scenes, saying that he would do it as an actor.

== Release ==
The film was theatrically released on September 16, 2009. The film received a television premiere on Cinema One on July 18, 2010. It also received a terrestrial television premiere on ABS-CBN on Christmas 2010, with almost 10 percent of national households tuned in (according to Kantar/TNS ratings).

== Reception ==
In My Life was met with acclaim from critics and at the box office. Many people praised the storyline, meaning, and acting of Vilma Santos, John Lloyd Cruz, and Luis Manzano.

The film garnered an unexpected ₱20,000,000 on its first day of release, and nearly ₱80,000,000 on its opening weekend.

By the end of 2009, In My Life placed second on the Top 13 local 2009 Philippine movies list just behind You Changed My Life, which also starred Cruz. In My Life would have broken Philippine movie records if not for Typhoon Ondoy.

=== Accolades ===
Accolades received by In My Life
Award	Date of ceremony	Category	Recipient(s)	Result	Ref.
8th Gawad Tanglaw Awards	March 3, 2010	Best Film	In My Life	Won	
8th Gawad Tanglaw Awards	March 3, 2010	Best Actor	John Lloyd Cruz	Won	
8th Gawad Tanglaw Awards	March 3, 2010	Best Actress	Vilma Santos	Won	
8th Gawad Tanglaw Awards	March 3, 2010	Best Supporting Actor	Luis Manzano	Won	
8th Gawad Tanglaw Awards	March 3, 2010	Best Director	Olivia M. Lamasan	Won	
Gawad Suri Awards	March 2010	Best Film	In My Life	Won	
Gawad Suri Awards	March 2010	Best Director	Olivia M. Lamasan	Won	
Gawad Suri Awards	March 2010	Best Actress	Vilma Santos	Won	
Gawad Suri Awards	March 2010	Best Actor	John Lloyd Cruz	Won	
Gawad Suri Awards	March 2010	Best Supporting Actor	Luis Manzano	Won	
26th PMPC Star Awards for Movies	April 24, 2010	Best Picture	In My Life	Won	
26th PMPC Star Awards for Movies	April 24, 2010	Best Director	Olivia M. Lamasan	Won	
26th PMPC Star Awards for Movies	April 24, 2010	Best Actress	Vilma Santos	Won	
26th PMPC Star Awards for Movies	April 24, 2010	Best Actor	John Lloyd Cruz	Won	
26th PMPC Star Awards for Movies	April 24, 2010	Best Supporting Actor	Luis Manzano	Won	
26th PMPC Star Awards for Movies	April 24, 2010	Best Screenplay	Senedy Que, Raymond Lee, and Olivia M. Lamasan	Won	
26th PMPC Star Awards for Movies	April 24, 2010	Best Cinematography	Charlie S. Peralta	Won	
41st GMMSF Box-office Entertainment Awards	June 22, 2010	Best Actress	Vilma Santos	Won	
41st GMMSF Box-office Entertainment Awards	June 22, 2010	Best Actors	John Lloyd Cruz and Luis Manzano	Won	
41st GMMSF Box-office Entertainment Awards	June 22, 2010	Best Screenplay	Raymond Lee, Senedy Que, and Olivia Lamasan	Won	
1st MTRCB Film Awards	June 25, 2010	Best Actress	Vilma Santos	Won	
1st MTRCB Film Awards	June 25, 2010	Best Supporting Actor	John Lloyd Cruz	Won	

- 4th Genio Awards (January 2, 2011)

- Best Actress - Vilma Santos
- Best Actor - John Lloyd Cruz
- Best Supporting Actor - Luis Manzano
- Best Screenplay
