= German Moreno =

Filipino television host, actor, comedian, and talent manager (1933–2016)

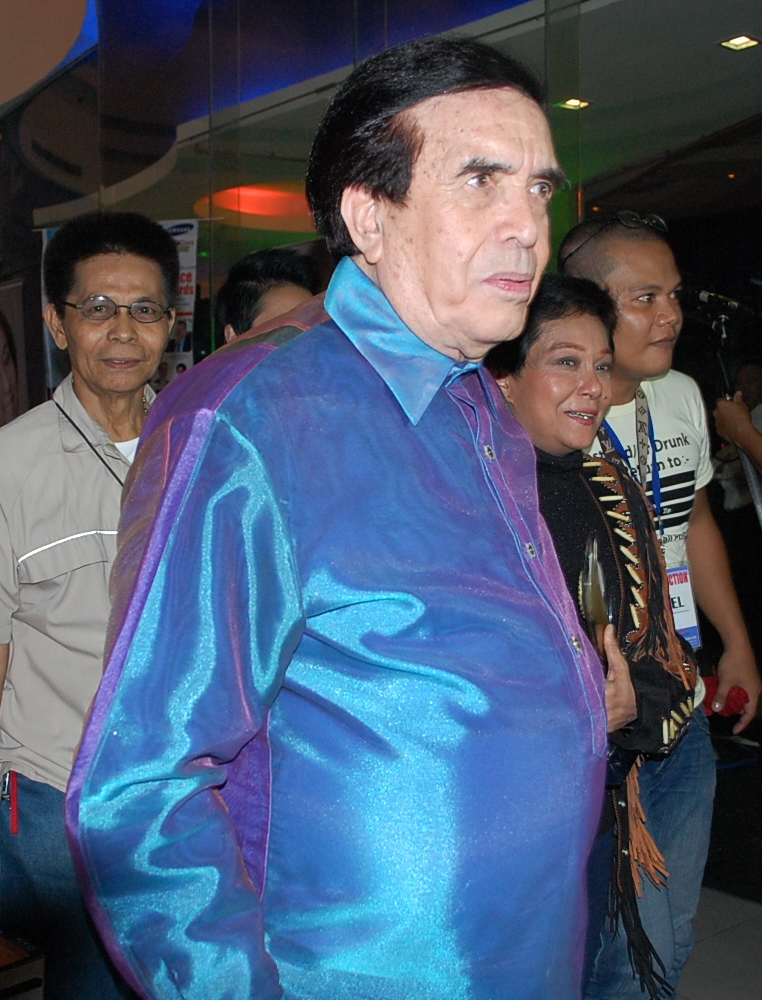
- Moreno in 2011
- Born: German Molina Moreno; October 4, 1933; Santa Cruz, Manila, Philippine Islands
- Died: January 8, 2016 (aged 82); Quezon City, Philippines
- Resting place: Loyola Memorial Park, Marikina, Metro Manila
- Other name: Kuya Germs
- Occupations: Host; actor; talent manager; producer; writer; director
- Years active: 1963–2016
- Title: The Master Showman
- Children: Federico Moreno (son)
- Relatives: Luis Gabriel Moreno (grandson); John Nite (nephew); Pilar Moreno-Nite (sister)

German Molina Moreno (Tagalog: [hɛɾˈman moˈɾɛno]; October 4, 1933 – January 8, 2016), also known as Kuya Germs (Tagalog: [kujɐ dʒɛɾms] or [dʒɚms]) and dubbed as "The Master Showman", was a Filipino television host, presenter, actor, comedian, talent manager, producer, writer, and director.

== Early life ==
German Molina Moreno was born to Jose Moreno y Calvo (Pepe), a Spanish Filipino mestizo, and Aurora Molina, a Filipina. He had one sister, Pilar Moreno Nite. His father died after an incident involving an American soldier. Moreno first worked for an aunt's taxi company and also sold bibingka, peanuts, and cigarettes. He also became a jeepney barker.

== Career ==
=== Early career ===
Moreno became involved in the entertainment industry working as a janitor and telonero (curtain raiser) of Clover Theater in 1957. His first break was a role as Jesus Christ for the Manila Grand Opera House. He later went on to pursue a career as a comedian of the bodabil stage and the post-war screen.

=== Later career ===
In 1963, Moreno took his comedy act to Sampaguita Pictures, the home of biggest stars at that time such as Dolphy, Panchito, Gloria Romero, and Susan Roces. He hosted a premiere night at the Life Theater but refused Nene Vera-Perez's attempt to pay him and instead asked for movie roles instead. Moreno then had roles in the movies Dance-O-Rama, Mga Batang Iskwater, Class Reunion, and Mga Batang Bakasyunista. It was in his Sampaguita stint where he met his longtime co-host Ike Lozada.

Moreno also became a disc jockey as Eddie Ilarde's sidekick in the radio program Ngayon Naman on CBN. In 1969, he transferred radio stations to DZTR as a pinch-hitter for Helen Vela, Bingo Lacson, and Ben David. Moreno would then be given his own timeslot from 11 pm to 12 mn for Bisita Artista, Music Factory, and Guy and Pip Song Festival. In his transfer to DZBB, he hosted his own noontime show during weekdays at 2:30 to 3:30 pm.

Moreno's biggest break came on television in the late 1970s when he became host of the Sunday noontime variety show, GMA Supershow (first known as Germside and Germspesyal). He eventually became the host, star builder, and producer of That's Entertainment, a youth-oriented variety show developing the biggest stars in the Philippines. He gave out gift packs from sponsors to every guest of his programs. He was the host of a late-night show Walang Tulugan with the Master Showman. He also co-hosted Superstar with Jograd de La Torre. Superstar was the Sunday musical-variety show of Moreno's close friend Nora Aunor.

Moreno also produced TV films such as Kung Mayroon Mang Pangarap, Ganti, Sa Paglinaw ng Tubig, Ikaw, Ako at ang Awit, Dalawang Ina, Dalawang Pag-ibig, Larawan ng Isang Ina, and Ina.

He founded the Eastwood City Walk of Fame in Quezon City, on December 1, 2005. It is patterned after the Hollywood Walk of Fame in Hollywood, California.

Since 1996, FAMAS had given out the Youth Achievement Award, named after him. The German Moreno Youth Achievement Award is given to a batch of young stars that have exemplar performances in the motion picture industry. The Philippine Movie Press Club also named after Moreno the German Moreno Power Tandem Award, awarded to popular love teams on television.

He was also the former president of Katipunan ng mga Artistang Pilipino sa Pelikula at Telebisyon (KAPPT). He also endorsed prominent brands such as Vaseline Shampoo and Dazz Dishwashing Paste.

In April 2013, Moreno celebrated his 50th anniversary in the Philippine entertainment industry with a tribute special entitled 50 Years With The Master Showman at the Newport Performing Arts Theater in Resorts World Manila, Pasay. The special was attended by Moreno's "anak-anakan" (his discoveries) throughout his five decades in showbiz.

On March 24, 2014, Moreno established the GMA Network's Walk of Fame, outside the GMA Network Center, with over 196 celebrities and news & public affairs personalities received the plaque.

In his final months, Moreno was the creative consultant of Sunday PinaSaya. He had a special chair in front of the stage, where he was sitting along with the studio audience to view the program. He celebrated his last birthday on October 4, 2015. Despite being in a wheelchair, he attended GMA Network's 2016 New Year countdown special at SM Mall Of Asia marking his last public appearance, and was last heard at Walang Siyesta on January 6, 2016.

== Personal life ==
Moreno had an adopted son named Federico Moreno. His grandson Luis Moreno is an archer. His nephew John Nite was also a TV host on Walang Tulugan with the Master Showman.

=== Political views ===
Moreno was a supporter of former President Ferdinand Marcos. In 1986, Moreno campaigned for the reelection of president Ferdinand Marcos in the 1986 snap election, with him continuing to support Marcos even after he was deposed from the presidency by the People Power Revolution; during a September 1988 episode of his musical program GMA Supershow, Moreno and his co-hosts sang a medley of songs dedicated to Marcos to commemorate his birthday.

=== Health and death ===
Moreno suffered a mild stroke on January 2, 2015. His condition improved soon after, according to his son Federico Moreno. Few months later, he returned to his programs Walang Siyesta! and Walang Tulugan with the Master Showman.

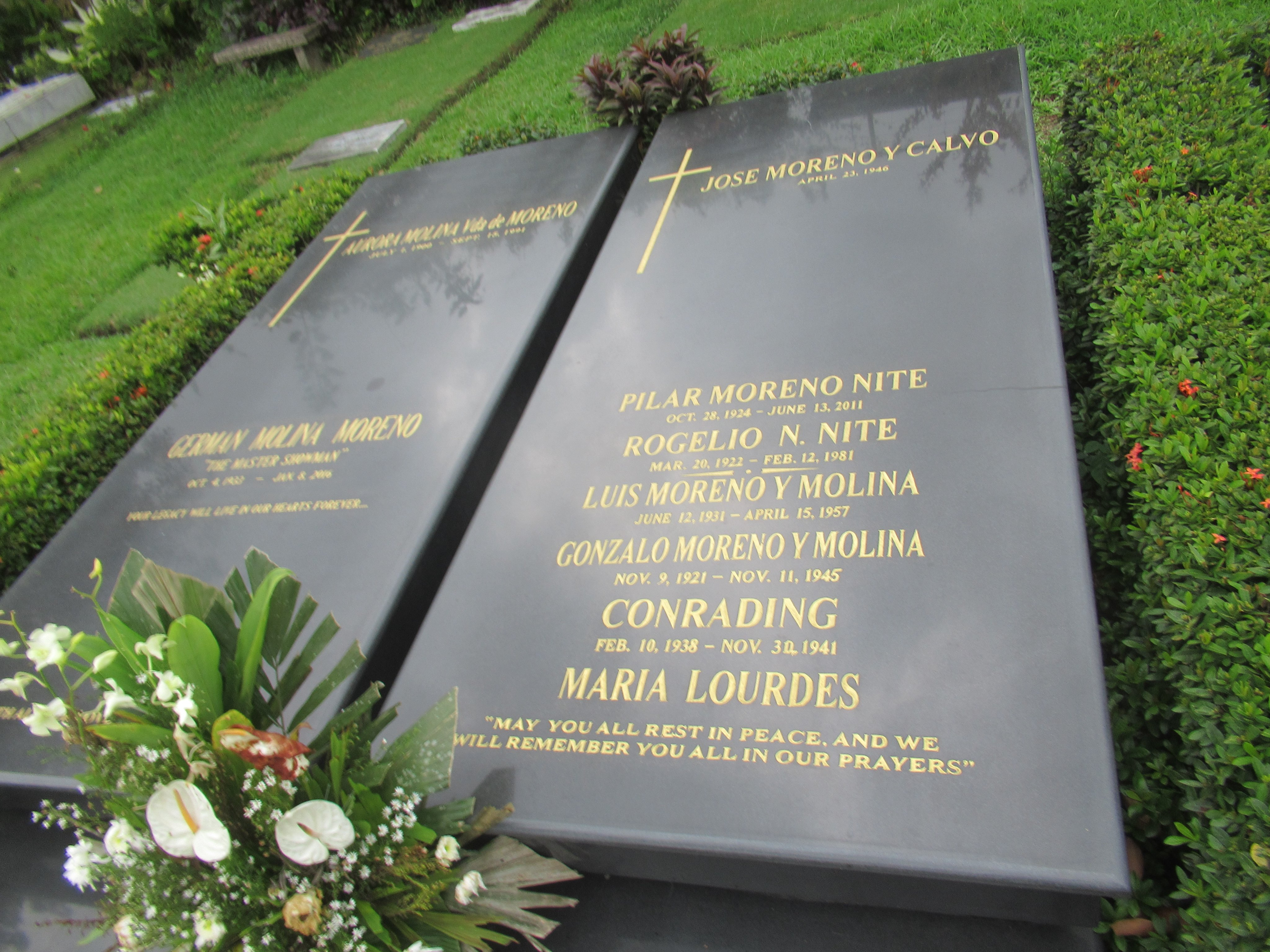
Moreno family graves

One year later, he was rushed into St. Luke's Medical Center at Quezon City in the evening of January 7, 2016 and fell into a coma. Moreno died on January 8, 2016, at 3:20 am from cardiac arrest, according to his nephew John Nite. He was 82 years old. Later that evening, his remains arrived at Our Lady of Mt. Carmel Shrine. The next day, a live tribute special of his show Walang Tulugan with the Master Showman was held in his wake. He was buried at the Loyola Memorial Park in Marikina after being brought to GMA Network Center. Moreno is buried beside his mother Aurora Molina (July 1, 1900 – September 15, 1991), father Jose Moreno y Calvo (Pepe) (c. 1894–April 23, 1946) with only sister Pilar Moreno Nite (October 28, 1924 – June 13, 2011), nephew Rogelio N. Nite, Luis Moreno y Molina, Conrading, Carlos M. Moreno and Maria Lourdes.

Walang Tulugan with the Master Showman concluded on February 13, 2016, a month after his death.

== Legacy and tribute ==
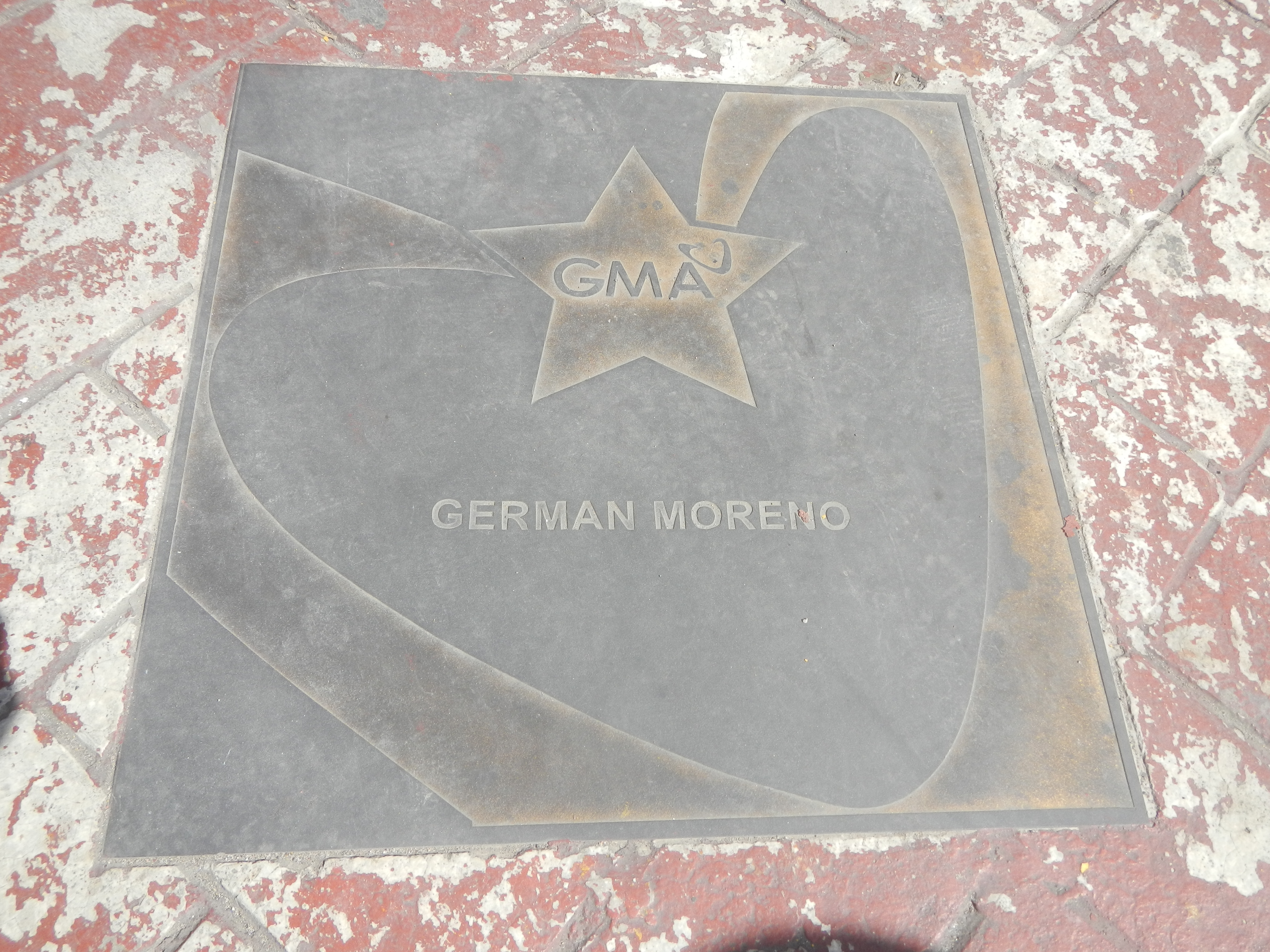
Moreno's plaque in GMA Network Center's Walk of Fame, which he founded in March 2014.

A special tribute concert entitled The Master Showman's Final Bow was aired on February 26, 2016, where the comedy show Bubble Gang was preempted to give way for the TV special (meanwhile host from Bubble Gang participated including Michael V. and Betong Sumaya). His son Federico announced the establishment of German Moreno Foundation, an organization made by Moreno's loved ones and friends. It will continue his support for Mowelfund, and honor stars through the Eastwood City Walk of Fame.

The German Moreno Power Tandem Award (launched in 2014) still continues up to the present day.

At the GMA Network Studio Annex in Quezon City, The German Moreno Studio (formerly known as Studio 6) was inaugurated in honor of his legacy and in tribute to his 85th birthday on October 4, 2018, with families, relatives, friends and the staff of GMA paying tribute. It currently houses the daily noontime variety game show TiktoClock.

== Filmography ==
=== Film ===
Year	Title	Role	Notes
1962	Kababalaghan o Kabulastugan?	Embalsamador (First story)	
1963	Si Adiang Waray		
1963	Dance-O-Rama		
1963	Ang Senyorito at ang Atsay	Tolome	
1963	Ang Class Reunion	German	
1963	Mga Kwela sa Eskwela		
1963	Sabina	Nipis	
1963	Ako'y Ibigin Mo, Dalagang Matapang		
1964	Paratroop Squadron		
1964	Mga Batang Iskwater		
1964	Ang Mahiwagang Pag-ibig ni Lola Cinderella		
1964	Magkakapatid na Waray		
1964	Sa Bilis Walang Kaparis		
1964	Mga Batang Bakasyonista		
1964	Anong Ganda Mo!		
1964	Kumander Judo		
1964	Mga Batang Milyonaryo		
1964	Jukebox Jamboree		
1964	Mga Kanyon Sa Corregidor		
1964	Mga Batang Artista		
1964	Hi-sosayti		
1964	Fighting Warays sa Ilokos		
1964	Mga Bata ng Lagim		
1964	Bathing Beauties		
1964	Show of Shows		
1964	Umibig ay 'di biro		
1965	Eskwelahang Munti		
1965	Mga Reynang Engkantada		
1965	Mga Batang Turista		
1965	Inday, Palalayasin Kita		
1965	Rosalie		
1965	Bye-bye na sa Daddy		
1965	Alis D'yan! H'wag 'Kong Ligawan		
1965	Papa um mamaw		
1965	Portrait of My Love		
1966	I'll Dream of You		
1966	Jamboree '66		
1966	Ay Ay Naku Neneng		
1966	O!... Kay Laking Eskandalo!		
1966	Sexy Yata 'Yan		
1966	Ang Lagay 'Adre... ay Under-Istanding		
1966	Sa Bawa't Lansangan		
1967	Bus Stop		
1967	Way Out in the Country		
1967	Cinderella A-Go-Go		
1967	Sunny		
1967	Sitting in the Park		
1967	Oh! What a Kiss		
1967	Double Date		
1967	Bikini Beach Party		
1967	Alma Vida		
1967	All Over the World		
1968	To Susan with Love		
1968	Sayonara My Darling		
1968	Order ni Osang		
1968	May Tampuhan, Paminsan-Minsan		
1968	Magic Guitar		
1968	Juanita Banana		
1968	Dobol Wedding		
1968	Bahay Kubo, Kahit Munti		
1968	Artista ang Aking Asawa		
1969	9 Teeners		
1969	YeYe Generation!		
1969	Obladi, Oblada		
1969	Young Girl		
1969	Banda 24		
1969	Stop, Look, Listen		
1969	Drakulita		
1969	Boom! Bang-A-Bang!		
1969	Fiesta Extravaganza		
1969	Petrang Paminta		
1969	Rikitik Loves Rositik		
1969	The Mad Generation		
1969	The Musical Giant		
1969	Halina Neneng Ko		
1970	Ricky Na, Tirso Pa!		
1970	Magic Makinilya		
1970	Orang		
1970	Yes I Believe		
1970	Singspiration		
1970	Your Love		
1970	The Young at Heart		
1970	Dingdong		
1970	Intensity '70		
1970	Give Me Your Love		
1970	For You, Mama		
1970	Sweet Matutinna		
1971	Always in My Heart		
1971	Guy and Pip		
1971	Fiesta Extravaganza '71		
1972	I Went to Your Wedding		
1972	A Gift of Love		
1972	Kung May Gusot, May Lusot		
1972	Winter Holiday		
1972	My Blue Hawaii		
1973	Tsismosang Tindera		
1973	Young Dreams		
1973	Kondesang Basahan		
1973	Impossible Dream	Master of Ceremonies	
1973	Girl of My Dreams		
1973	Dyesebel		
1973	Isa, Dalawa, Tatlo		
1973	Anak ng Aswang		
1973	Ang Hiwaga ni Maria Cinderalla		
1973	Super Gee		
1973	Ophella at Paris		
1973	Fight Batman Fight!		
1973	Darna and the Giants	Comics reader	uncredited
1974	Baticobra at Flying Salakot		
1974	Somewhere Over the Rainbow		
1974	Memories of Our Love		
1974	Kampanerang Kuba	Flaving	
1974	Ang Bituin at Araw		
1974	Biktima	Pipot	uncredited
1974	Huwag Tularan: Pito ang Asawa Ko		
1974	Oh Margie Oh	Musical director	
1975	Loose Connections		
1975	Hello, Goodnight, Goodbye		Episode 1: Hello
1975	Vilma Veinte Nueve		
1975	Niño Valiente		
1975	Batu-bato sa Langit: Ang Tamaa'y Huwag Magagalit	Pocholo	
1976	Relaks Lang Mama, Sagot Kita		
1976	Ang Erpat Kong Groovy		
1976	Ngiti, Tawa at Halakhak		
1976	Let's Do the Salsa		
1976	Wanted: Ded or Alayb (Agad-agad)		
1976	Fiesta: Isang Halik! Isang Sayaw! Isang Peseta!		
1976	Relax Lang, Mama... Sagot Kita		
1976	Kaming Matatapang ang Apog!		
1976	Sapagka't Kami'y Mga Misis Lamang		
1976	Tsuperstar		
1976	Minsa'y Isang Gamu-gamo		
1976	Barok		
1977	Jack and Poy (Hale-Hale Hoy)		
1977	Maliit Ngunit Matinik		
1977	Wow, Sikat! Pare, Bigat!		
1977	Pinakasalan Ko Ang Ina ng Aking Kapatid		
1977	Herkulas		
1977	Disco Baby		
1977	Mr. Wong and the Bionic Girls		
1978	Isang Kahig, Isang Tuka, sa Langit at Lupa		
1978	Sa Lungga ng Mga Daga		
1978	Topo-Topo Barega: Dumila Ka sa Baga		
1978	Mga Mata ni Angelita	Rice cake vendor	
1978	Dyesebel	Mr. Espejo	
1979	Roberta		
1979	Darna, Kuno...?	San Pedro	
1979	Angelita... Ako ang Iyong Ina	Biko	
1979	Annie Batungbakal		
1979	Buhay Artista Ngayon		
1979	Bokyo		
1979	Kasal-kasalan, Bahay-bahayan		
1979	Anak ng Atsay	Germania	
1980	Pompa	Rico	
1980	Darna at Ding		
1980	Yakapin Mo'ko, Lalaking Matapang		
1980	Goriong Butete	Sara	
1980	Hepe		
1980	Reyna ng Pitong Gatang	Police officer	
1980	Juan Tamad Jr.		
1980	Batang North Harbor		
1980	Kape't Gatas		
1981	Familia Antik		
1981	Tikboy and Pamboy		
1981	Totoo Ba ang Tsimis?		
1981	Ibalik ang Swerti		
1981	Burgis	Nurse	
1981	Hepe Goes to War		
1981	Mister Kwekong (Driver ng Punerarya)		
1981	Rocky Tu-log		
1982	Johnny Tanggo		
1982	Annie Sabungera		
1982	Palengke Queen		
1982	Cross My Heart		
1982	Tatlo Silang Tatay Ko		
1983	Warren Balane		
1983	D' Godson		
1984	Give Me Five!		
1984	Anak ni Waray vs. Anak ni Biday		
1984	Bulaklak sa City Jail	Warden Ambrocio	
1985	Mga Paru-parong Buking		
1985	Pahiram Na Ligaya		
1985	Momooo		
1985	Bituing Walang Ningning	TV host	
1985	Inday Bote	Manager	
1986	Okleng Tokleng		
1986	Sana'y Wala Nang Wakas	Radio DJ	
1986	Ang Daigdig Ay Isang Butil Na Luha		
1986	Payaso		
1987	Di Bale Na Lang		uncredited
1987	Ready!.. Aim!.. Fire!..		
1987	Takot Ako, Eh!		
1988	Matandang Barako, Hindi Pa Buro..!	Uncle of Elizabeth	
1990	Pangarap Na Ginto		
1991	Katabi Ko'y Mamaw	Luigi	
1991	Ubos Na ang Luha Ko		
1991	Yes, Yes, Yo: Kabayong Kutsero!	Husband	
1991	Kung Sino Pa ang Minahal		
1991	Juan Tamad at Mister Shooli: Mongolian Barbecue		
1993	Silang Mga Sisiw sa Lansangan (The Street Children)		
1994	Sige, Ihataw Mo		
1995	Ang Syota Kong Balikbayan	Sgt. Azuela	
1996	Madaling Mamatay, Mahirap Mabuhay		
1997	Frats	Dean Valdez	
1998	Sinaktan Mo ang Puso Ko	Director	
1998	Legacy	Santiago	
2000	Ayos Na... ang Kasunod		
2000	Basta Tricycle Driver... Sweet Lover		
2002	Hustler	Emcee	
2005	Pelukang Itim: Agimat ko Ito For Victory Again		
2006	Mga Batang Bangketa		
2006	Binibining K		
2007	Ang M.O.N.A.Y. ni Mr. Shooli (Misteyks Opda Neysion Adres Yata)		
2008	Paupahan	Dadeng	
2008	Adela	Himself	
2009	OMG (Oh, My Girl!)	Himself	
2010	Slow Fade		
2011	Tween Academy: Class of 2012	Mang Fabian	
2012	My Kontrabida Girl		
2012	Moron 5 and the Crying Lady	Isaac's father	
2012	Talo, Tabla, Panalo		
2012	D' Kilabots: Pogi Brothers (Weh?!?)	Kuya Hermano Mayor	
2013	Kung Fu Divas	Hiyas ng Dalampasigan Host	
2014	Moron 5.2: The Transformation	Isaac's father	Last film appearance

=== Television ===
Year	Title	Role	Notes
1973–1979	Big Ike's Happening	Himself	Host
1978–1980; 1980–1984; 1984–1997	GMA Supershow (formerly Germside and Germspesyal)	Himself	Main host
1975–1989	Superstar	Himself	Host
1987–1990	Young Love, Sweet Love	Himself	Host
1984–1987	Daigdig ng mga Artista sa Telebisyon	Himself	Host
1987–1989	Good Morning Showbiz	Himself	Host
1986–1996	That's Entertainment	Himself	Main host and producer
1986–1995	Saturday Entertainment	Himself	Main host and producer
1990–1998	NegoSiyete	Himself	Host
1994	Oki Doki Doc!		Guest
1995	GMA Telesine Specials: Sa Pagdating Ng Bagong Umaga		Supporting cast / producer
1996	Super Games	Himself	Host
1996	1896		Episode: "Ang Pagliliwanag ng Isip ni Cecilio"
1996	GMA Telesine Specials: May Apat Na Sulok ang Bilog		Main role / producer
1996–1997	Lyra	Kwaro	Supporting cast
1997–2016	Walang Tulugan with the Master Showman (formerly Master Showman Presents)	Himself	Main host
1998	Kool Ka Lang		Guest
1998	GMA Telesine Specials: Pasada	Tata Cholo	Leading role / Producer
1998	Debate with Mare at Pare	Himself	Guest
1999	Best Friends	Himself	Host
2000–2005	Idol Ko si Kap	Barangay Kagawad	Supporting cast
2000	Wansapanataym: Bata Okey		
2002	Magpakailanman: Minsan, May Isang Bituin	Himself	The Didith Reyes Story
2003–2006	Love to Love		
2005	Magpakailanman: Isang Pag-Ibig na Itinakda ng Langit	Himself	The Manilyn Reynes Story
2005–2006	Ginintuang Telon	Himself	Host
2007	Magic Kamison	Don Vino Blanco	
2008	Sine Novela: Kaputol Ng Isang Awit		
2008	Nuts Entertainment	Himself	Guest
2009	Adik Sa'Yo	Joe	Supporting cast
2009	Pinoy Records Presents Pinoy Extreme Talent	Himself	Judge
2009	Dantes Peak: The Dingdong Dantes Birthday Special	Himself	TV special
2009	I-Witness: Master Showman	Himself	Documentary by Sandra Aguinaldo (re-aired on January 9, 2016, a day after his death)
2010–2011	Pinoy Cine Klasika	Himself	Main host
2010	Kaya ng Powers	Himself	Guest
2010	Diva	Kuya Vernes	Recurring cast
2010	Beauty Queen	Kapitan Ading	Supporting cast
2011	Spooky Nights Presents: Snow White Lady and the Seven Ghosts	Dr. Jordan "Jay"	Supporting cast
2011	Power House	Himself	Interviewed about his three-storey house
2011	Showtime	Himself	Guest
2012–2013	Paroa: Ang Kuwento ni Mariposa	Apo Pasko	Recurring cast
2012	24 Oras	Himself	Guest (interviewed about Dolphy's passing)
2012	Party Pilipinas	Himself	Guest performer (Special dancer in Sayaw Pilipinas segment)
2012	Tunay Na Buhay	Himself	Interviewed about his life
2013	H.O.T. TV	Himself	Guest
2013	Kape at Balita	Himself	Guest
2013	50 Years with the Master Showman	Himself	TV special
2013	Pepito Manaloto: Ang Tunay na Kuwento	Himself	Cameo appearance
2013	Pyra: Babaeng Apoy	Mr. Sirko	Guest cast
2013	Rated K	Himself	Interviewed about his suit collection
2013	Toda Max	Himself	Guest cast
2014	Niño	Kapitan Pete	Supporting cast
2014	Basta Every Day Happy!	Himself	Guest (with his son Federico and grandson Luis)
2014	Gandang Gabi, Vice!	Himself	Guest (re-aired on January 10, 2016, 2 days after his death)
2015	Yagit	Florentino Valdez	Guest cast / cameo appearance
2015	Sabado Badoo		Cameo featured footage
2015–2016	Sunday PinaSaya	Himself	Creative consultant / studio viewer along with audiences
2015–2016	Countdown To 2016: The GMA New Year Special	Himself	Host (Last TV and public appearance)

=== Radio ===
- DZTR Music Factory (1970s)
- Bisitang Artista (DZBB) (1975–1989)
- Balitang Showbiz (DZBB) (1989–1997)
- Master Showman sa Dobol B (Walang Siyesta!) (1997–2016)

== Awards ==
- Winner, Best Supporting Actor for "Paupahan" - 2009 FAMAS Awards
- Winner, Ading Fernando Lifetime Achievement Award - PMPC Star Awards for TV (1993)
- Winner, Best Variety Show Host - PMPC Star Awards for TV (1988, 1991, 1993 & 1994)
- Winner, Special Citation Award - PMPC Star Awards for TV (2013)
- Winner, Best Supporting Actor - PMPC Star Awards for Movies (2009)
- Posthumous Award Winner for Entertainment Excellence & Star Builder - GMMSF Box-Office Entertainment Awards (2016)
