= Ricky Rivero =

Filipino actor and film director (1972–2023)

- Born: 25 May 1972; Philippines
- Died: 16 July 2023 (aged 51); Quezon City, Philippines
- Occupations: Actor, director
- Known for: That's Entertainment
- Relatives: Phillip Salvador (uncle)

Ricky Salvador Rivero (May 25, 1972 – July 16, 2023) was a Filipino actor and director.

== Career ==
Rivero started his acting career as a child actor in the 1978 FPJ film Patayin si... Mediavillo. He was best known for appearing in German Moreno's variety show That's Entertainment which aired in 1986 until on GMA. He also did appearances in other GMA television shows, as well as in ABS-CBN's. He also did acting roles for feature films, starring in Ninja Kids and Samurai Sword.

Rivero was also a television director and was responsible for overseeing the production of Kokey (2007), Forevermore (2014), and Mula sa Puso (2011).

The 2023 work D' Aswang Slayerz which starred Mel Martinez, marked Rivero's debut as a film director.

== Personal life and death ==
Rivero was openly gay and had a partner. His uncle, Phillip Salvador is also an actor.

On June 13, 2011, Rivero survived a stabbing incident. He was able to bring himself to a hospital despite sustaining multiple wounds reportedly inflicted by a former friend he knew from Facebook.

Rivero suffered a stroke in 2015, which he recovered from after months of treatment. However, he subsequently had difficulties in walking and had to use a wheelchair occasionally. In May 2023, Rivero was confined to the Philippine Heart Center in Quezon City after suffering from a second stroke and remained in the hospital throughout June. Rivero died on July 16, 2023, at the age of 51.
