= I Got You (TV series) =

2020–21 Philippine television romantic comedy drama series

- Title card
- Genre: Drama; Romantic comedy
- Created by: Albee Benitez
- Developed by: Brightlight Productions
- Written by: Rod Marmol
- Directed by: Dan Villegas
- Starring: Beauty Gonzalez; RK Bagatsing; Jane Oineza
- Opening theme: "Tahan Na" by Jason Marvin Hernandez
- Country of origin: Philippines
- Original language: Filipino
- No. of episodes: 13

Production
- Executive producers: Albee Benitez; Corrina Vistan; Joji Alonso; Patricia Daza
- Producers: Albee Benitez; Erickson Raymundo; Dan Villegas; Antoinette Jadaone
- Production location: Philippines
- Camera setup: Single-camera
- Running time: 60 minutes (with commercials)
- Production companies: Brightlight Productions; Cignal Entertainment; CS (Cornerstone) Studios; Project 8

Original release
- Network: TV5
- Release: October 18, 2020 – January 10, 2021

I Got You is a Philippine romantic comedy television series broadcast by TV5. Directed by Dan Villegas, it stars Beauty Gonzalez, RK Bagatsing, and Jane Oineza. It aired on the network's Sunday afternoon block from October 18, 2020 to January 10, 2021. In June 2021, the show became available on Brightlight Productions programming affiliate ABS-CBN's streaming platform iWantTFC and worldwide via The Filipino Channel.

On January 17, 2021, the same day Sunday Noontime Live! and Sunday 'Kada aired their final episodes, I Got You aired a replay of its final episode. In June 2021, the show became available on Brightlight Productions programming affiliate ABS-CBN's streaming platform iWantTFC and worldwide via The Filipino Channel.

== Premise ==
Del Ruiz (Beauty Gonzalez) is a successful therapist who has a vast experience in the field of psychology, having worked both at home and abroad. However, her own life is full of obstacles and heartaches that she must try to navigate, including motherhood. An old flame in the form of Louie (RK Bagatsing), a former soldier with PTSD resurfaces after a long time away, who just happens to be the secret lover in the life of social media influencer Rissa, Del's new client. Temptation and sorrow of the past come to battle with Del's heart and soul, as she tries to comprehend her true feelings and character.

== Cast ==
Main cast

- Beauty Gonzalez as Del - a therapist and Louie's ex
- RK Bagatsing as Louie - Risa's boyfriend-turned-fiancé and Del's ex
- Jane Oineza as Risa - a beauty vlogger and Louie's fiancée

Supporting cast

- Chantal Videla as Iya - Del and Louie's daughter
- Dionne Monsanto as Hailey - owner of the bar Louie applies to for work

== Reception ==
A review of the series stated "Compelling performances of its lead actors and a beautifully-maneuvered direction set I Got You apart from the traditional sappy afternoon tv romance. It’s light, heartwarming, has wonderful humor, but most of all, it talks about second chances at love and destiny, and empowers those who still believe in it."

== See also ==
- List of programs broadcast by TV5 (Philippine TV network)
- List of programs broadcast by Kapamilya Channel
- List of programs broadcast by A2Z (Philippine TV channel)
- List of programs broadcast by Kapamilya Online Live
- List of programs broadcast by Jeepney TV
- The Filipino Channel
- Kapatid Channel
