= Home Sweetie Home =

2014–20 Philippine television comedy drama series

- Title card 2019–2020
- Also known as: Home Sweetie Home (2014–2018); Home Sweetie Home: Walang Kapares (2018–2019); Home Sweetie Home: Extra Sweet (2019–2020)
- Genre: Sitcom
- Developed by: ABS-CBN Studios; Linggit Tan–Marasigan; Rhandy G. Reyes Creative Manager Rhandy G. Reyes
- Written by: Rhandy G. Reyes Sherwin Buenavida
- Directed by: Edgar Mortiz
- Starring: See cast
- Opening theme: "Home Sweetie Home" by John Lloyd Cruz and Toni Gonzaga (Season 1–2) "Home Sweetie Home Extra Sweet" by Fumiya Sankai and Toni Gonzaga (Season 3)
- Country of origin: Philippines
- Original language: Filipino
- No. of seasons: 3
- No. of episodes: 315

Production
- Executive producer: Celeste Villanueva Lumasac-Santiago
- Running time: 45 minutes
- Production companies: LTM Unit (Seasons 1–2); Star Creatives (Season 3)

Original release
- Network: ABS-CBN
- Release: January 5, 2014 – March 14, 2020

Related
- Oh My Dad! My Papa Pi

Home Sweetie Home is a Philippine television situational comedy series broadcast by ABS-CBN. Directed by Edgar Mortiz, it stars Toni Gonzaga and John Lloyd Cruz. It aired on the network's Yes Weekend! line up from January 5, 2014 to March 14, 2020, replacing Toda Max and was replaced by Paano Kita Mapasasalamatan?. The sketch comedy tackled the lives of a newly married couple and their ways to address the needs of a typical Filipino household.

After the departure of John Lloyd Cruz and Ellen Adarna, the show was later renamed Home Sweetie Home: Walang Kapares In 2018. Piolo Pascual, Ogie Alcasid and Rufa Mae Quinto were added during Cruz's absence.

A fully renovated season called Home Sweetie Home: Extra Sweet premiered on May 11, 2019. Star Creatives took over the production of the show. Several new cast members include Vhong Navarro, Luis Manzano, Alex Gonzaga, Bayani Agbayani, Rio Locsin, Edgar Mortiz and Pinoy Big Brother: Otso housemates Fumiya Sankai and Yamyam Gucong.

It was abruptly cancelled on March 14, 2020 due to the COVID-19 pandemic in the Philippines, and was replaced with the reruns of Wansapanataym until the indefinite closure of ABS-CBN because of the cease and desist order of the National Telecommunications Commission (NTC), following the expiration of the network's 25-year franchise granted in 1995.

Home Sweetie Home returned in October 2020 through Brightlight Productions and aired on TV5, retitled as Oh My Dad! and featured a different cast and crew.

== Plot ==
Title card (2014)

Home Sweetie Home follows the story of Romeo Valentino (John Lloyd Cruz) and Julie Matahimik (Toni Gonzaga) who lived together under one roof. Julie's mother Loi (Sandy Andolong) disapproves Romeo as her son-in-law because of his reputation as a womanizer, and prefers Jay-Jay (Jayson Gainza) whom she considers fit for her daughter, seeing him as responsible. Still, Romeo and Julie decide to marry each other. However, in turn, Romeo has to deal with Julie's family in the best way he knows how. The first season ends with Romeo suddenly disappearing.

In "Walang Kapares", Julie struggles to live without Romeo, who disappeared while working abroad overseas along with his workmate Tanya (Ellen Adarna). Romeo's cousin JP (Piolo Pascual) enters the lives of Julie's family and starts to develop romantic feelings for Julie. Later on, Julie receives a letter from Romeo about their annulment. Heartbroken, she is coping with her separation from Romeo with the help from her family and friends. The story ends with Romeo and Julie's house burned in the fire accidentally triggered by Obet (Jobert Austria).

In "Extra Sweet", Julie moves on with her life and her family moves to a new home with help from her aunt, Loi's sister Oya (Rio Locsin). There, Julie will meet her half-sister Mikee (Alex Gonzaga) and her new neighbors.

== Cast ==
=== Final cast ===
==== Main cast ====
- Toni Gonzaga as Julie Matahimik-Valentino – A teacher who married Romeo two times.
- Vhong Navarro as Ferdinand "Ferdie" Bustamante – Julie's new neighbor.
- Alex Gonzaga as Mikee Montes – Julie's rich half-sister and new neighbor.
- Miles Ocampo as Gigi Matahimik – Julie's teenage sister.
- Clarence Delgado as Rence Matahimik – Julie's younger brother.
- Allegra Valiente as Summer Valentino – Romeo and Julie's one and only daughter.
- Luis Manzano as Pip – Julie's new neighbor.

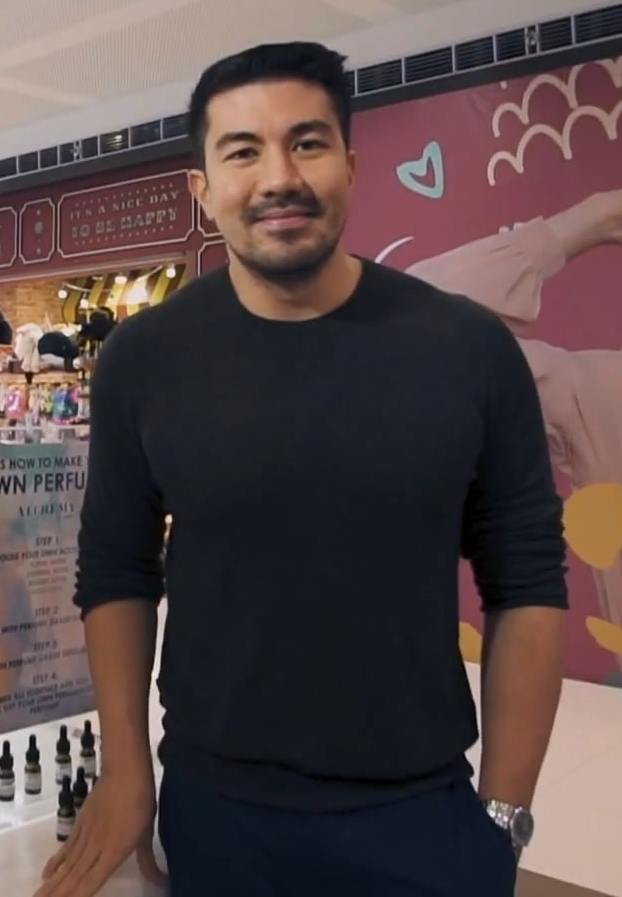
Luis Manzano portrays Pip

- Bayani Agbayani as Edwin – Julie's new neighbor.
- Rio Locsin as Tita Oya – Loi's sister and Julie's aunt.
- Edgar Mortiz as Kap. Frank C. Natra – A barangay captain who's in love with Oya.
- Jobert Austria as Obet – Romeo and Julie's friend who owns a bakery.
- Nonong Ballinan as P-Nong – A former staff of L.A. Sing-along bar and Magda's love interest.
- Fumiya Sankai as Hiro – A Japanese exchange student and one of Julie's new neighbors.
- Yamyam Gucong as Bogs – A pawnshop caretaker and one of Julie's new neighbors.
- Jordan Ford as Jordan – JP's son.
- Carmi Martin as Manuela Montes – Mikee's mother.
- Kaori Oinuma as Akiko – Hiro's Japanese friend of whom Bogs is jealous.

==== Supporting cast ====
- Ogie Diaz as Rafael "Boss Paeng" Samonte – Romeo's boss.
- Mitoy Yonting as L.A. – Romeo and Julie's friend who owns the L.A. Sing-along bar.
- Eda Nolan as Candy – Julie's co-teacher and best friend.
- Wacky Kiray as Joaquin – Julie's co-teacher.
- Paul Sy as Lino – Romeo's co-worker and friend.
- Christine Co as Maria – Romeo's co-worker.
- Charmaine Villa Alovera as Magda – Obet's niece and P-Nong's love interest.
- Gabbi Adeva as Gab – Gigi's co-worker and friend.
- Allyson McBride as Arianna – Rence's love interest.
- Jaya as Ms. Jay-Ah – Julie's new boss.
- Long Mejia as Ka Freddy Aguila – A barangay captain.
- Christian Bables as Chrissy – Julie's new co-worker and friend.
- Kim Molina as Kimmy – Julie's new co-worker and friend.

==== Recurring cast ====
- Jayson Gainza as Jay-Jay Perez – Julie's long-time suitor. Loi initially wanted Julie to end up with Jay-Jay.
- Phillip Salvador as Manuel "Manny" Matahimik – Julie's father.
- Karla Estrada as Tita Maricris Matahimik – Julie's aunt and Manny's sister.
- Keanna Reeves as Tita Ems – Nanay Loi's brokenhearted sister.
- Cacai Bautista as Jasmine – Jay-Jay's wife.
- Kristel Fulgar as Jonarie – One of Gigi's classmates.
- Nikki Bagaporo as Danica – One of Gigi's classmates.
- Jameson Blake as Luke – Gigi's newest inspiration.
- Mutya Orquia as Val – Rence's tomboyish friend who has a secret crush on him.
- Izzy Canillo
- Joseph Marco
- Bugoy Cariño
- Dennis Padilla

=== Former cast ===
- John Lloyd Cruz as Romeo Valentino – A former medical representative and present travel agent who married Julie two times. Romeo was never seen again after he disappeared while working abroad overseas with her workmate Tanya. He later sends a letter to Julie about their annulment.
- Ellen Adarna as Tanya – Romeo's workmate and mistress.
- Sandy Andolong as Loida "Nanay Loi" Matahimik – Julie's mother.
- Rico J. Puno as Vino "Daddy V" Valentino – Romeo's deceased father.
- Bearwin Meily as Ed – Romeo's friend and co-worker.
- Joross Gamboa as Glenn de la Torre – One of Romeo's childhood friends.
- Ketchup Eusebio as Chris Suarez – One of Romeo's childhood friends.
- Diana Zubiri as Susie Samonte – Romeo's boss who left the country for a business trip.
- Karen Dematera as Karen – One of the staffs for L.A. Sing-along bar.
- Eric Nicolas as Eric – One of the staffs for L.A. Sing-along bar, Eric is Romeo and Julie's friend who is sometimes a troublemaker.
- Ryan Bang as Ryan – Julie's Korean student who wants to learn Filipino language.
- Piolo Pascual as John Paul "JP" Valentino – Romeo's cousin who develops a relationship with Julie.
- Ogie Alcasid as Ireneo "Neo" and Irenea "Renee" – Neo is Julie's childhood friend, while Renee is Neo's twin who falls in love with JP.
- Rufa Mae Quinto as Lia Meneses – Ariana's mother and Julie's neighbor friend.

=== Guest cast ===
- Vhong Navarro (2014, 2016)
- Vice Ganda (2016)
- Bela Padilla (2016)
- Enrique Gil (2015-2016)
- Liza Soberano (2015)
- Kim Chiu (2014)
- Maja Salvador (2014)
- Alex Gonzaga (2015-2016)
- Sam Pinto (2016)
- Jolina Magdangal (2015-2016)
- John Lapus (2014)
- Ryan Bang (2014)
- Dominic Ochoa (2016)
- Heaven Peralejo (2016)
- Maricar Reyes (2016)
- Marco Gumabao (2017)
- Yassi Pressman (2016)
- Sarah Geronimo (2015)
- Xander Ford (2015–2017)
- Alexa Ilacad as Sharon (2017)
- Nash Aguas as Kiko (2017)
- Luis Hontiveros (2017)
- Anthony Taberna (2017)
- Julius Babao (2017)
- Karen Davila (2017)
- Atom Araullo (2017)
- Mica Javier (2017)
- Alice Dixson (2017)
- Marco Masa (2017)
- Sophia Reola (2017)
- Sam Shoaf (2017)
- Lyca Gairanod (2017)
- Ryza Cenon (2018)
- Aljur Abrenica (2018)
- Keempee de Leon (2018)
- Empoy Marquez (2017–2019)
- Onyok Pineda (2018)
- Regine Velasquez (2019)

== Series overview ==
Season	Episodes	Originally released	
Season	Episodes	First released	Last released
1	215	January 5, 2014	April 7, 2018
2	57	April 14, 2018	May 4, 2019
3	43	May 11, 2019	March 14, 2020

== Accolades ==
- Winner, Best Comedy Show – PMPC Star Awards For TV 2014
- Winner, Best TV Comedy Program – KBP Golden Dove Awards 2015
- Winner, Best Comedy Program – ALTA Media Icon Awards 2015
- Winner, Best Comedy Show – Gawad Tanglaw 2016
- Winner, Students' Choice of Comedy Program – USTv Awards 2016
- Winner, Best Comedy Show – Kabantugan Awards 2016
- Winner, Best TV Comedy Program – KBP Golden Dove Awards 2017
- Winner, Best Comedy Actor (Ogie Alcasid) – PMPC Star Awards For TV 2018
- Winner, Best Comedy Actress (Rufa Mae Quinto) – PMPC Star Awards For TV 2018
