= Brightlight Productions =

Filipino television and film production company

Brightlight Leisure Productions, Inc.
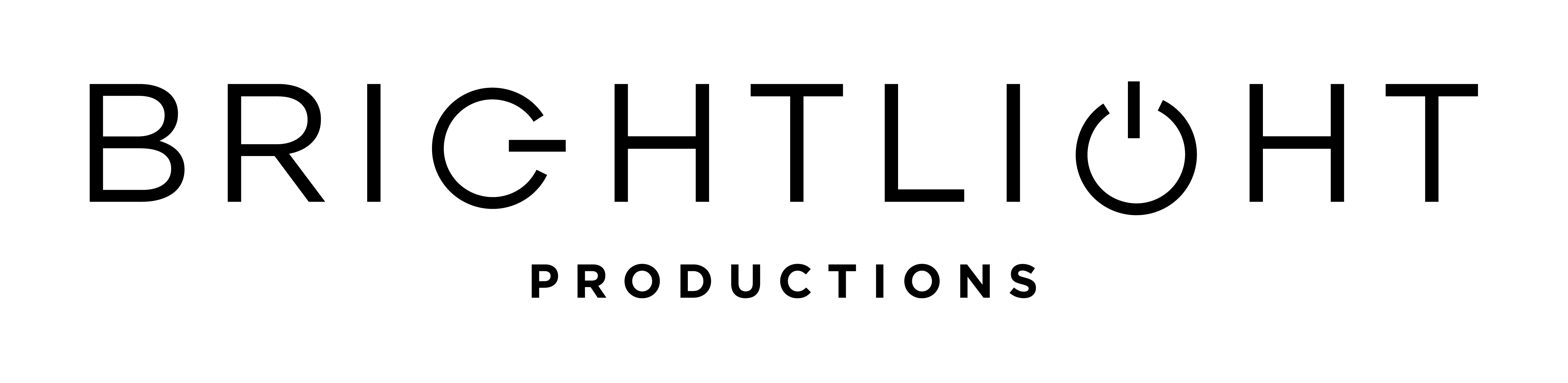
- Trade name: Brightlight Productions
- Company type: Private
- Industry: Television production Film production
- Founded: September 8, 2020; 5 years ago
- Founder: Albee Benitez
- Headquarters: 92 Timog Avenue, Diliman, Quezon City, Metro Manila, Philippines
- Area served: Worldwide
- Key people: Albee Benitez (CEO, Chairman); Johnny Manahan; Edgar Mortiz; Gina Alajar
- Products: Television programs Motion pictures
- Website: www.brightlightproductionsph.com

Brightlight Leisure Productions Inc. is a Filipino television, film production company and talent agency headquartered in Quezon City. It was founded in 2020 by gaming businessman Albee Benitez who previously served as Negros Occidental's 3rd district representative from 2010 to 2019, and Mayor of Bacolod from 2022 to 2025, and is currently Bacolod's Lone district representative.

Airing more than 18 hours of airtime every week, it currently serves as one of the blocktime partners and distributor of Cignal Entertainment for TV5 and ABS-CBN Corporation for Kapamilya Channel, A2Z (blocktime with ZOE Broadcasting Network), Kapamilya Online Live, ABS-CBN's international channel The Filipino Channel, and streaming platform iWantTFC (blocktime for Rated Korina and airing rights for Sunday 'Kada, Oh My Dad!, and I Got You) and has signed up stars and talents from ABS-CBN and GMA Network.

== History ==
Following the non-renewal of ABS-CBN's franchise after its expiration on May 4, 2020, and its denial on July 10, 2020, as well as the following layoffs on August 31, 2020, amidst the COVID-19 pandemic in the Philippines, which had put restrictions on the workforce of the artists, TV5 secured timeslots from several other blocktimers featuring artists from the aforementioned network. On September 14, 2020, it was reported that several ABS-CBN artists would have shows on TV5 after the company signed a blocktime agreement with the said network.

On October 18, 2020, Brightlight Productions launched their first wave of shows, namely, Sunday Noontime Live!, I Got You and Sunday 'Kada which aired on back-to-back Sunday afternoon timeslots. In the following days, the other shows premiered.

On January 17, 2021, it was reported that after three months, their Sunday programs would air their final episodes due to lack of advertisers and sponsorships. This resulted in the loss of their budget to pay the blocktime agreement with TV5.

Following the end of their Sunday programs, ABS-CBN-produced programs ASAP and the FPJ: Da King movie block took over their respective timeslots on TV5. Their Sunday afternoon shows ended on January 17, 2021, while Oh My Dad! ended on April 24, 2021.

On July 16, 2022, Lunch Out Loud was reformatted with a new title Tropang LOL and began its simulcast over Kapamilya Channel, Kapamilya Online Live and A2Z, being aired as a pre-programming to It's Showtime, who started its simulcast on TV5 on the said date. It's Showtime reduced its airtime to 135 minutes to give way for the simulcast of Tropang LOL on the latter two networks. This arrangement lasted until April 29, 2023, when Tropang LOL aired its final episode with It's Showtime reverted to its original 12:00 PM timeslot with an airtime of 180 minutes.

Some of their shows (like Rated Korina and Sunday 'Kada) are currently airing on programming affiliate ABS-CBN's iWantTFC and worldwide via The Filipino Channel.

== Artists ==
Artists currently under Brightlight Productions are as follows:

- Pat-P Daza
- Sandy Daza
- Vic Sotto
- Pauleen Luna
- Korina Sanchez-Roxas

=== Former artists ===
- Piolo Pascual
- Catriona Gray
- Maja Salvador
- Donny Pangilinan
- Jake Ejercito
- Ricci Rivero
- Jane Oineza
- RK Bagatsing
- Ritz Azul
- Miles Ocampo
- Daniel Matsunaga
- Edgar Mortiz
- Jayson Gainza
- Sue Ramirez
- Regine Velasquez
- Billy Crawford
- Alex Gonzaga
- Bayani Agbayani
- K Brosas
- Ariel Rivera
- Ariel Ureta
- Wacky Kiray
- Gloria Diaz
- Louise Abuel
- Elijah Alejo

== Filmography ==
=== Television ===
Year	Title	Network	Associated Production
2020–2021	Sunday Noontime Live!	TV5	CS (Cornerstone) Studios
2020–2021	I Got You	TV5	CS (Cornerstone) Studios
2020–2021	Sunday 'Kada	TV5	
2020–2022	Lunch Out Loud	TV5	
2020–2023	Rated Korina	A2Z (2021–2023) / Kapamilya Channel (2021–2023) / One PH (2020–2023) / TV5 (2020–2023)	
2020–2021	Oh My Dad!	TV5	Quantum Films
2021	The Spotlight	TV5	
2022–present	Lutong Daza	Net 25	Net 25
2022–2023	Tropang LOL	A2Z / Kapamilya Channel / TV5	
2022–present	Love, Bosleng and Tali	Net 25	Net 25; M-Zet Productions
2022–2023	Korina Interviews	Net 25	Net 25

=== Film ===
Year	Title	Associated Production
2020	Magikland	Gallaga-Reyes Films
2023	Here Comes the Groom	Quantum Films; Cineko Productions
2023	Kampon	Quantum Films; OctoArts Films

== See also ==
- Star Magic
- Sparkle GMA Artist Center
- Viva Artists Agency
- TVJ Productions
