= Banana Sundae =

2008–20 Philippine television sketch comedy show

- Title card
- Also known as: Banana Split (2008–11); Banana Split: Daily Servings (2009–11); Banana Split: Lafternoon Delight (2011); Banana Nite (2013–15); Banana Split: Extra Scoop (2011–15); Banana Sundae (2015–20)
- Genre: Gag show Stand-up comedy
- Created by: Edgar Mortiz
- Developed by: ABS-CBN Studios
- Directed by: Edgar Mortiz; Jose Mari Reyes
- Starring: See cast
- Country of origin: Philippines
- Original language: Filipino

Production
- Executive producer: Rocky Ubana
- Production locations: Studio 5, ABS-CBN Broadcasting Center, Diliman, Quezon City; Music Museum, Greenhills, San Juan City (2012–15)
- Running time: 60 minutes

Original release
- Network: ABS-CBN
- Release: October 11, 2008 – April 5, 2020

Related
- Sunday 'Kada; Goin' Bulilit

Banana Sundae (formerly Banana Split) is a Philippine television sketch comedy show broadcast by ABS-CBN. Directed by Edgar Mortiz and Jose Mari Reyes, it was originally starred by Angelica Panganiban, Cristine Reyes, Roxanne Guinoo, Valerie Concepcion, Dianne Medina, Princess Ryan and RR Enriquez. It aired on the network's Saturday evening line-up from October 11, 2008 to April 5, 2020, replacing That's My Doc. Panganiban, John Prats, Jayson Gainza, Pooh, Pokwang, Badjie Mortiz, Ryan Bang, Jobert Austria, Sunshine Garcia, JC de Vera, Aiko Climaco, Ritz Azul, Wacky Kiray and Barbie Imperial serving as the final cast.

== History ==
Banana Split is a spiritual successor to the comedy program Goin' Bananas that featured Edgar Mortiz, Christopher de Leon, Jay Ilagan, and Johnny Delgado.

Banana Split debuted on October 11, 2008, with an all-girl cast led by Angelica Panganiban and Cristine Reyes, with different male celebrity guests each week. The second season premiered on February 28, 2009, and the third season on April 18, 2009, with a new cast, including John Prats, Zanjoe Marudo, Jayson Gainza, Pooh, and Pokwang. The fourth season premiered on July 18, 2009. On September 30, 2009, a 30-minute weekday afternoon edition called Banana Split: Daily Servings originally aired every Monday to Friday on the network's Hapontastic (now Kapamilya Gold) afternoon block. The timeslot later moved to Umaganda weekday morning block from 10:00 AM to 10:30 AM starting August 2010, but was moved again twice as early from 9:00 AM to 9:30 AM on June 27, 2011. On July 9, 2011, the original Saturday edition was reformatted as Banana Split: Extra Scoop, featuring live comedy performances and also includes the second season of Clown in a Million, a reality comedy search. On September 12, 2011, Banana Split: Daily Servings was renamed to Banana Split: Lafternoon Delight (after the 1987 noontime variety show "Afternoon Delight" which aired before being replaced by Eat Bulaga! in 1989.) as the timeslot moved to 2:45 PM as part of Kapamilya Gold afternoon block. However, it was later cancelled on October 7, 2011.

Banana Split: Extra Scoop garnered high ratings on its Saturday late-night timeslot compare to the counterpart programs. Due to the success, ABS-CBN launched a late-weeknight edition called Banana Nite which premiered on February 25, 2013, every Monday to Friday right after Bandila, replacing certain Current Affairs shows. Banana Nite extended its airtime to 45 minutes on August 5, 2013, but was later reverted to 30 minutes on February 10, 2014, onwards. Banana Nite ended on October 30, 2015, after a two-year run. Meanwhile, Banana Split: Extra Scoop ended on November 7, 2015, after its four-year run. The show reformatted on November 15, 2015, as Banana Sundae which now airs every Sunday afternoons at 2:30 PM right after ASAP Natin 'To.

Banana Split original logo (2008–2015)

In April 2020, Banana Sundae was taken off the air in response to rival network GMA extending Kapuso Movie Festival to a two-movie block. This switch forced the network to extend the Sunday edition of KB Family Weekend to two movies, causing ASAP Natin 'To shorten to a 1-hour airtime in Banana Sundae's timeslot, as part of ABS-CBN's temporary programming changes due to the 2020 Luzon lockdown (also known locally as the Enhanced Community Quarantine or ECQ; which is part of the COVID-19 pandemic in the country). However, the program was discontinued when ABS-CBN Channel 2 was forced to shut down indefinitely. Past episodes of the program were later aired via ABS-CBN's interim replacement, Kapamilya Channel, every weeknight at 11:45 PM between June and July 2020.

According to an article from Philippine Entertainment Portal, a gag show similar to Banana Sundae (considered its "successor") started airing on October 18, 2020, on TV5, produced by Brightlight Productions. However, the program was retitled as Sunday 'Kada with only a few of its cast and director, Mortiz, of Banana Sundae on board.

== Cast ==
Final cast

- Angelica Panganiban (2008–2020)
- John Prats (2009–2020)
- Jayson Gainza (2009–2020)
- Pooh (2009–2020)
- Pokwang (2009-2011; 2015–2020)
- Badjie Mortiz (2009-2020)
- Ryan Bang (2010–2020)
- Jobert Austria (2011–2020)
- Sunshine Garcia (2011–2020)
- JC de Vera (2013–2020)
- Aiko Climaco (2013–2020)
- Ritz Azul (2017–2020)
- Wacky Kiray (2017–2020)
- Barbie Imperial (2020)

Former cast

- Cristine Reyes (2008–2009)
- Roxanne Guinoo (2008–2009)
- Valerie Concepcion (2008–2009)
- Dianne Medina (2008–2009)
- Princess Ryan (2008–2010)
- RR Enriquez (2008–2011)
- Zanjoe Marudo (2009–2010; 2012–2015)
- Niña Jose (2009–2010)
- A.A. Ponce (2009–2011)
- Rasheed Collado (2009-2011)
- Melai Cantiveros (2010–2015)
- Gab Valenciano (2010–2011)
- Melissa Ricks (2010–2011)
- Jason Francisco (2010–2012)
- Jef Gaitan (2010–2015)
- Le Chazz (2010–2015)
- Alora Sasam (2012–2015)
- Boom Labrusca (2012–2015)
- Manuel Chua (2013–2015)
- Alex Gonzaga (2013–2015)
- Kean Cipriano (2013–2015)
- Jennica Garcia (2014)
- Mitoy Yonting (2014–2015)
- Jessy Mendiola (2015–2017)
- Shine Kuk (2017–2018)
- Empoy Marquez (2017–2019)
- Saicy Aguila

== Portions ==
=== Final portions/segments ===
- Aquiknow and Aboonduh Tonite - A parody of defunct late-night talk show Aquino & Abunda Tonight hosted by Kris Aquino and Boy Abunda. This portion is played by Angelica Panganiban as Krissy Aquiknow, and Jayson Gainza as Bhoy Aboonduh.
- Krissy TV - A parody of defunct morning talk show Kris TV hosted by Kris Aquino. It is portrayed by Angelica Panganiban as Krissy Aquiknow, Jayson Gainza as Krissy's assistant Dharla (a parody of Kris TV headwriter Darla Sauler), and John Prats as Bimby Aquino Yap.
- Clown in a Million - The talent search for comedians, where funny people with no or little television experience battle it out to be proclaimed as the latest comedic talent discovery.
- Banana Classics - A sketch or comic skit where two or more actors portray roles to convey a simple story that culminates in a punchline, just to make people laugh. It is done before a live audience without cuts, thus requiring the material to be visual rather than verbal.
- Extra Spoof - A segment where the cast impersonates famous icons, idols, and celebrities of past and present times, living or deceased. It is cohesively presented with a common theme like novelty icons, the icons from the 80s, 90s, and 2000s, or internationally known Pinoy singers.
- Make Me Rap -
- Oh My Shopping! - A parody of O Shopping where the cast is asked to pick a certain item from a chosen box which they need to sell like an infomercial show.

Former segments (from Banana Nite and Banana Sundae)

- Barado Sisters (later as "Hala Bara!")
- Eto na Post
- Kandila (parody of late-night newscast Bandila)
  - Ihaw Na! (parody of Ikaw Na!, a defunct Bandila segment)
- Krissy and Me (parody of Kris TV)
- Laugh Three
- "Painting"
- Surprise Bwi-set
- Tres Kumpares
- Rated SSPG: Sobra-Sobrang Pilyong Gags, Bawal Sa Bata, Tulog Na! (a parody of MTRCB's SPG rating advisory, a collection of green jokes)
- Chazz Do It
- Yaya and Angel (parody of Ang Spoiled, a sketch from rival gag show Bubble Gang)
- Mr. Bang (parody of Mr. Bean)
- Aquiknow & Aboonduh Tonite (parody of Aquino & Abunda Tonight)
- Sosyal, 'Di Sosyal
- Banana Recap
  - Monday Funday
  - Timeless Tuesday
  - Wayback Wednesday
  - Throwback Thursday
  - Flashback Friday
- Maling Akala
- Dr. Selfie
- Balitang Six-Six
- Fake Yan
- Pag May Time
- Kontra Pick-Up
- Pinoy True Stories parodies
  - TnT: Tapatan ni Tunting (parody of Tapatan ni Tunying)
  - Bistodo (parody of Bistado)
  - Kutya ng Masa (parody of Mutya ng Masa)
- How Dare You (parody of reality show I Dare You)
- Single, In a Relationship, It's Complicated
- Munting Kaalaman
- Pogi vs. Tambay
- Hot Issue
- Brad Bro Bru
- Isang Tanong, Isang Sagot

=== Former portions/segments ===
- Banana Gags
- Maharlika Films presents Engot (parody of drama series Iglot by GMA Network)
- Mutanglawin (parody of educational show Matanglawin)
  - Mutanglawin Trivia (short edition)
- Television Show Parodies
- Ang O.A. Mo!
- James Bang.007
- M3: Melai Mo Mag-Work (segment returned on April 16, 2011) (parody of M3: Malay Mo Ma-develop and Maalaala Mo Kaya)
- Art-Throb
- AlphaBert
  - AlphaBert VS Letterman
- Ang TV Patrol: News and Other Affairs (parody of Ang TV and TV Patrol)
- Balitang Siksik
  - Balitang Siksik: Celebrity Edition (Every Saturday)
- Brod, Bro, Bru
  - Brod, Bro, Bru (The Props Edition!)
  - Brod, Bro, Bru, Bai (added with Cebuano interpretation during Cebu Special 2009)
  - Brod, Bro, Bruce Lee (Chinese Tagalog slang)
  - Brod, Bro, Bruken (German Tagalog slang)
- Commercial Parodies
- NNNN: Entertainment News Na Naman! (a parody of defunct showbiz news program SNN: Showbiz News Ngayon)
- Sosyal, Pasosyal, Wasosyal
- S.M.S. (Sa Madaling Salita)
- S.A.K.O.: Sakote ang Kriminal Operation (parody of S.O.C.O.: Scene of the Crime Operatives)
- Senyales
- TanTaranTongue Twister
- That's Impossible! (once called "That's Impoohsible!" because of John Prats' absence)
- Three Stoodents (a parody of The Three Stooges and its animated counterpart The New Three Stooges)
- The Amazing Microwave Pandesal Rangers (a parody of Power Rangers)
- Dyaskeng Bieber
- Iba-Iba Gamit, na Walang Gamit, na Isang Gamit!
- Andy The Handyman
- Many Pacquiao
- Uban Zone (parody of Urban Zone hosted by Daphne Oseña-Paez)
- AlphaBeth
- Rizza Masahista
- Show It! (parody of Showtime hosted by Pooh; Pokwang takes his place when absent.)
- Tongue Tarang Tongue
- Krissy For You
- Huwag Kang Lilingon
- Tekki Muna
- Ask Jobert
- Yes Maam!
- Dear Ethang
- Magic Singh (although a parody of an Indian magician with the same name, the portion's title is a corruption of the microphone brand Magic Sing, only that the word 'sing' is added with letter H)
- Just Draw It (parody from the U.S. TV series Win, Lose or Draw hosted by Pooh)
- Damoobs ni Kuya Jobert
- Swertang Malas
- Bokya
- Hula-Hulaan!
- Ryan's English 101.1 (the portion's title is a corruption from radio station 101.1 Yes! FM, now 101.1 Yes! The Best)
- Samurai Halo-Halo
- New Problema
- Ikaw Ang Bruha/Puga/Lola/Siba/Gluta/Siga/Duda (& etc.) (parody of Ikaw Ang Bida, a segment from the defunct noontime show Happy Yipee Yehey!)
- Ano Nga Kaya?
- Fashion Pulezz!
- Mang Ben
- J. Walking

== Clown in a Million: Season 2 (2011) ==
=== Elimination chart ===
Contestant	Date											
Contestant	10/22/11		10/29/11	11/12/11	11/19/11	11/26/11	12/03/11	12/10/11	12/17/11	12/24/11 Wild Card	01/07/12	
Contestant	10/22/11		10/29/11	11/12/11	11/19/11	11/26/11	12/03/11	12/10/11	12/17/11	12/24/11 Wild Card	Score	Result
Karen	Laugh 10	Safe	Safe	Safe	Safe	Won	Laugh 5	Safe	Final 4		93%	Winner
Mimi	Laugh 10	Safe	Safe	Safe	Safe	Safe	Laugh 5	Safe	Final 4		81%	1st Runner-up
Super Tekla	Laugh 10	Won	Safe	Won	Safe	Safe	Laugh 5	Safe	Final 4		77%	2nd Runner-up
Leo	Laugh 10	Safe	Won	Safe	Safe	Safe	Eliminated			Final 4	65%	3rd Runner-up
Onse	Laugh 10	Safe	Safe	Safe	Safe	Safe	Laugh 5	Safe	Eliminated	Eliminated		
James	Laugh 10	Safe	Safe	Safe	Won	~~Eliminated~~	Laugh 5	Eliminated		Eliminated		
Ichat	Laugh 10	Safe	Safe	Safe	Eliminated							
Jandyll	Laugh 10	Safe	Safe	Eliminated								
Jodie	Laugh 10	Safe	Eliminated									
Michael	Laugh 10	Eliminated										
Baba-Low	Eliminated											
Chad	Eliminated											
GB	Eliminated											
Ryan	Eliminated											
Tresha	Eliminated											

The contestant won the competition
The contestant was eliminated
The contestant won the wild card round.
The contestant won immunity from the next elimination
The contestant was deemed the worst but was immune from elimination

== Controversies ==
=== Theme song ===
Lito Camo composed the theme song Banana Split performed by Kool Chix, and is available as a bonus track in Willie Revillame's album Giling Giling from Star Records. However, the theme song was changed during the third season, which is a re-composition of The Champs' Tequila.

=== Gay kiss issue ===
During the December 6, 2008 episode, Rafael Rosell (as a guest), Jon Avila, and Will Devaughn were involved in a joke segment following a dating game, where Rosell was kissed by the gay actors instead of the usual Banana Split girls. Rosell consented to the practical joke and to being blindfolded and kissed on the cheek, but they instead kissed him on the lips. This event caused a short rift between Rosell and a Banana Split executive producer, as Rosell thought he was being taken advantage of. As a result, few clips were aired instead of the whole segment. A public apology was also delivered after the end of the show.

=== Casting cut-out ===
Valerie Concepcion, Roxanne Guinoo and Dianne Medina left Banana Split to focus on Precious Hearts Romances series where they will act in different episodes. It was reported that Guinoo was removed from the show because of her weight problems, while Concepcion left the show due to a talent fee dispute. The rift between Angelica Panganiban and Cristine Reyes arose as another issue, resulting in Reyes' departure.

=== John Prats and Jason Francisco Altercation ===
Cast members John Prats and Jason Francisco figured in an altercation during rehearsals for a show in 2013 to be held at the Music Museum. The two parties eventually patched things up a year later.

=== Binay Blackface skit ===
Banana Sundae attracted controversy prior to the May 13, 2019, elections when they aired a skit parodying the church argument of Binay siblings Abby Binay and Junjun Binay, who were both Makati mayoral candidates. Pooh and former SexBomb Girls member Sunshine Garcia played as the Binay siblings, putting black makeup on themselves. The skit drew mixed reactions with viewers calling it "racist and insensitive" as well as referencing the history of blackface, while others noted that the show never mocked skin color, but instead, the argument itself and the political history of the Binay family.

== SPG rating ==
Banana Sundae is given an SPG rating by the Movie and Television Review and Classification Board (MTRCB) due to themes and strong languages not suitable for very young audiences.

== Accolades ==
- 24th PMPC Star Awards for Television's "Best Gag Show" – Banana Split (Won)
- 24th PMPC Star Awards for Television's "Best Comedy Actress" – Angelica Panganiban (Won)
- 23rd PMPC Star Awards for Television's "Best Gag Show" – Banana Split (Won – tied with GMA-7's Bubble Gang)
- 27th PMPC Star Awards for Television's "Best Gag Show" – Banana Split: Extra Scoop (Won – tied with GMA-7's Bubble Gang)
- 23rd PMPC Star Awards for Television's "Best Comedy Actor" – Pooh (Won)
- 8th Gawad Tanglaw Best Comedy/Gag Show" – Banana Split (Won – tied with Goin' Bulilit)
- 29th PMPC Star Awards for Television's "Best Gag Show" – Banana Split: Extra Scoop (Won)
- 29th PMPC Star Awards for Television's "Best Comedy Actor" – Jayson Gainza (Won)

== See also ==
- Super Laff-In
- Bubble Gang
- Tropang Trumpo
- List of programs broadcast by ABS-CBN
