= Jayson Gainza =

Filipino actor and comedian

- Born: April 27, 1980 (age 46); Batangas City, Batangas, Philippines
- Other name: Jay
- Occupations: Actor; comedian; host
- Years active: 2005–present
- Agents: Star Magic (2005–2021); Sparkle (2022–present)
- Known for: Pinoy Big Brother; Banana Sundae
- Height: 1.70 m (5 ft 7 in)
- Spouse: Denden Gainza

Jayson Camangyan Gainza (born April 27, 1980) is a Filipino actor, comedian, impersonator, host, entrepreneur and vlogger. He was the first runner-up (Second Big Placer) in Pinoy Big Brother, as he garnered 312,258 votes, equal to 27.5% of the total votes.

Gainza is best known for his impersonation of talk show host Boy Abunda as "Tito Bhoy Aboonduh", in the Banana Split segment NNNN: Ntertainment News Na Naman and Banana Nite segment Ihaw Na! (respective parodies of former television show SNN: Showbiz News Ngayon and former Bandila talk segment Ikaw Na!).

Following the conclusion of gag show Banana Sundae, he became the lead cast member of its considered successor Sunday 'Kada until he went on hiatus in 2021. Gainza is later reunited with Home Sweetie Home co-stars John Lloyd Cruz and Miles Ocampo in a GMA Network sitcom Happy ToGetHer. He continued appearing in more of GMA's programs and eventually signed a contract with its talent management arm Sparkle on November 22, 2022.

Gainza is currently serving as a host of noontime variety show TiktoClock, which he previously guested.

== Filmography ==
=== Television ===
Year	Title	Role	Notes	Source
2005	Pinoy Big Brother: Season 1	Himself	Housemate / Runner-up	
2006	Sa Piling Mo	Jason	Supporting cast	
2006	Gudtaym	Himself	Co-host	
2006–2011	Trip na Trip	Himself	Co-host	
2006–2007	Aalog-Alog	Jayson Santiago	Supporting cast	
2007	Mars Ravelo's Lastikman	Carlos "Caloy" Asis	Extended cast	
2008	Volta	Mark	Supporting cast	
2008–2009	I Love Betty La Fea	Adolfo Robles	Guest role	
2009	Parekoy	Jess	Main role	
2009–2020	Banana Split / Banana Nite / Banana Sundae	Himself / Various characters (including Tito Bhoy Aboonduh)	Cast member	
2009	Agimat: Ang Mga Alamat ni Ramon Revilla: Tiagong Akyat	Father Baste	Supporting cast	
2009	Wowowee	Himself	Guest	
2010	Rod Santiago's Agua Bendita	Ben Ramirez	Supporting cast	
2010	Your Song: Love Me, Love You	Drunker	Cameo role	
2010	Us Girls	Himself	Guest	
2010	Pilipinas Win na Win	Himself	Co-host	
2010	Showtime	Tito Bhoy Aboonduh	Guest / Substitute judge for Vice Ganda	
2011	Pablo S. Gomez's Mutya	Tonyo Salvador	Supporting cast	
2011	100 Days to Heaven	Eloy	Guest role	
2011	Budoy	Kiko	Guest role	
2011	Wansapanataym: Santa Maybe	Badong	Episode role	
2012	Ikaw ay Pag-Ibig	Val Garrido	Guest role	
2012	Junior MasterChef Pinoy Edition	Himself	Guest judge	
2012	Mundo Man ay Magunaw	Atoy Poblador	Main role	
2012	Wansapanataym: Lara Laro	Makmak	Episode role	
2012–2013	Ina, Kapatid, Anak	Oscar Apolinario	Supporting cast	
2012	Wansapanataym: Trick Or Trixie	Crisanto Dela Cruz	Episode role	
2013	Little Champ	Melchor	Guest role	
2013	Wansapanataym: Petrang Paminta	Ronald	Episode role	
2013	Bandila	Tito Bhoy Aboonduh	Guest	
2014	I Do	Himself	Host	
2014	Home Sweetie Home	Jay-Jay	Recurring cast	
2015	Nathaniel	Dimas Salvacion	Supporting cast	
2016	My Super D	Oscar	Supporting cast	
2016–2018	FPJ's Ang Probinsyano	Jimmyboy "Jimboy" Escaño	Guest role	
2018	Ipaglaban Mo: Bicol	Josep	Episode role	
2018	Ngayon at Kailanman	Macoy	Supporting cast	
2019	Maalaala Mo Kaya: Kumelavoo	Jayson	Episode role	
2019	A Soldier's Heart			
2020	Bawal na Game Show	Himself	Contestant	
2020–2021	Sunday 'Kada	Himself / Various characters	Cast member	
2020	Lunch Out Loud	Tito Bhoy Aboonduh	Guest (BUWAYArtista segment)	
2021	Maalaala Mo Kaya: Mikropono	Jude	Episode role	
2021	Rolling In It Philippines	Himself	Contestant	
2021	Sing Galing	Himself	Guest	
2021	Niña Niño	Jim Bond	Guest role	
2021–2023	Happy ToGetHer	Mike Escaño	Supporting cast	
2022–present	TiktoClock	Himself	Host	
2022	Family Feud	Himself	Contestant / Team Happy ToGetHer	
2022	All-Out Sundays	Himself	Guest	
2022	The Boobay and Tekla Show	Himself	Guest	
2022	Sarap, 'Di Ba?	Himself	Guest	
2023	Mga Lihim ni Urduja	Jose/Magat	Supporting cast	
2023–2024	Black Rider	Ernesto "Estong" P. Gomez	Supporting cast	
2024	Open 24/7	Mr. Manlabo	Guest	
2026	Barangay Love Stories	Harry's father	Episode: "Aking Paruparo"	

=== Digital ===
Year	Title	Role
2022	Beach Bros	Pete Resureccion's father
2022	Tara, G!	Vito

=== Film ===
Year	Title	Role
2006	Reyna: ang makulay na pakikipagsapalaran ng mga achucherva, achuchuva, achechenes...	Jayson
2007	You Got Me!	Rene
2007	Shake, Rattle & Roll 9	Tonton
2008	One Night Only	Barney
2009	Kimmy Dora: Kambal sa Kiyeme	Barry's friend
2012	Kimmy Dora and the Temple of Kiyeme	Barry's friend/Best Men
2012	This Guy's in Love with U Mare!	Nitoy
2012	24/7 in Love	Finn
2013	Call Center Girl	Vendor
2018	Kusina Kings	Manny Duncut

== Awards and nominations ==
Year	Award giving body	Category	Nominated work	Results
2008	22nd PMPC Star Awards for TV	Best Travel Show Host (shared with Kat de Castro and Franzen Fajardo)	Trip na Trip	Won
2011	25th PMPC Star Awards for TV	Best Travel Show Host (shared with Kat de Castro and Franzen Fajardo)	Trip na Trip	Won
2011	25th PMPC Star Awards for TV	Best Comedy Actor	Banana Split	Nominated
2013	27th PMPC Star Awards for TV	Best Comedy Actor	Banana Split	Nominated
2015	29th PMPC Star Awards for TV	Best Comedy Actor	Banana Split	Won

== Music video appearances ==
- "Shopping" (Ryan Bang feat. Donnalyn Bartolome) with Aiko Climaco, Sunshine Garcia, Jef Gaitan, Mayumi Yokoyama, and Kristine Santamena
