= Alex Gonzaga =

Filipino actress, host, and YouTuber (born 1988)

Alex Gonzaga-Morada
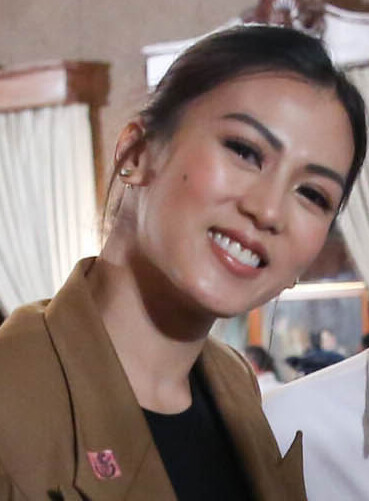
- Gonzaga in 2019
- Born: Catherine Cruz Gonzaga; January 16, 1988 (age 38); Taytay, Rizal, Philippines
- Education: University of Asia and the Pacific (BS)
- Occupations: Actress; host; singer; YouTuber; author; entrepreneur
- Years active: 2006–present
- Agents: Star Magic (2006–2008; 2013–2020); Talent5 (2009–2013); Brightlight Productions (2020–2023)
- Spouse: Mikee Morada (m. 2020)
- Children: 1
- Relatives: Paul Soriano (brother-in-law)
- Family: Toni Gonzaga (sister)

YouTube information
- Channel: Alex Gonzaga Official
- Years active: 2017–present
- Genre: Comedy
- Subscribers: 13.1 million
- Views: 1.3 billion
- Musical career
- Genres: Pop; OPM
- Instrument: Vocals
- Years active: 2015–present
- Label: Star Music

Spouse of the Vice Mayor of Lipa, Batangas
- Incumbent
- Assumed role June 30, 2025
- Vice Mayor: Mikee Morada
- Preceded by: Kevin Braynel Pural
- Last updated: April 15, 2022

Catherine "Alex" Cruz Gonzaga-Morada (Tagalog pronunciation: [gɔnˈsaga mɔˈɾada]; born January 16, 1988) is a Filipino actress and YouTuber. She played the lead role of Diane Santos on the Philippine television drama series Pure Love (2014).

== Early life ==
Alex Gonzaga was born Catherine Cruz Gonzaga on January 16, 1988, in Taytay, Rizal, Philippines, to Crisanta "Pinty" Cruz and then-Vice-Mayor Carlito "Bonoy" Gonzaga. Her elder sister is TV host and actress Toni Gonzaga.

Alex graduated from the University of Asia and the Pacific with a Bachelor of Science in Child Development and Education.

== Personal life ==
In November 2016, Gonzaga began dating Lipa councilor Mikee Morada after being introduced to him by actor Piolo Pascual that same year. On January 16, 2020, Gonzaga announced on Instagram that she and Morada were engaged. On January 17, 2021, Gonzaga announced on her YouTube channel that she and Morada have been married in a private wedding at the Gonzaga residence in Taytay since November 2020.

On October 24, 2020, Gonzaga announced that she and her family announced tested positive for COVID-19.

In 2021, Gonzaga was pregnant with her first child, until she suffered a miscarriage. In October 2023, she suffered a second miscarriage, followed by a third in December 2024. In May 2026, Gonzaga announced her fourth pregnancy. Their child was born in August that year.

== Career ==
=== 2006–2012: Early works ===
Gonzaga started her career on ABS-CBN for the sitcom, Let's Go!, where she played the role of Alex, which also became her personal nickname. Her role lasted until the series' fourth season called Gokada Go!. After her departure from the sitcom, she was cast in different dramas on the same network, such as Pangarap na Bituin, Your Song and My Girl.

In 2008, Gonzaga transferred to TV5 and became one of the hosts for the talk show, Juicy!. She played a lead role in the 2011 soap opera Babaeng Hampaslupa. Further roles on the network include BFGF, P.S. I Love You and Enchanted Garden.

=== 2013–2019: Breakthrough ===
Gonzaga returned to ABS-CBN in April 2013. She was a co-host for the Philippine version of The Voice. She also served as a guest host for the Philippine version of Big Brother on its All In season. During the pilot episode of PBB: All In, Gonzaga was revealed to be the third and final celebrity housemate to enter the Pinoy Big Brother house, following collegiate athlete Michele Gumabao and actress Jane Oineza. She was given the title as "Sassy Sister ng Rizal". During a diary room session with Big Brother, Gonzaga turns out to be actually a celebrity houseguest and was tasked to avoid revealing the information to the other official housemates. After staying in the Big Brother house for two months, she returned to the "outside world" on June 14, 2014, and she was replaced by internet sensation Cheridel Alejandrino, also known as "Elevator Girl". Gonzaga went on to play her most major role as the lead character Diane Santos in the hit drama series Pure Love, a Philippine adaptation of Korean drama 49 Days, co-starring Yen Santos. Pure Love aired from July to November 2014.

She was also part of the comedy gag show Banana Split, and also starred in the drama anthology Maalaala Mo Kaya for two episodes. She then released her novel book Dear Alex, Break na Kami. Paano? Love Catherine (2014), under ABS-CBN Publishing, Inc. The novel received positive reviews from fans and critics alike, most complimenting the novel's "break-up" concept and enjoying its humor. A film adaption for the novel was reported to be in the works, with Gonzaga sharing interest in casting Luis Manzano, John Lloyd Cruz and Piolo Pascual for the film adaption.

She was also cast on her first film under Star Cinema, The Amazing Praybeyt Benjamin (2014), one of the official entries to the 40th Metro Manila Film Festival. The film was commercially successful and achieved the milestones for having the highest-gross on opening day of any local film and the title of being one of the highest-grossing local film of all time in the Philippines. The film received mixed to negative reviews from critics. Zig Marasigan from Rappler described the film in his movie review as "a brainless, hyper-stylized and utterly ridiculous family comedy."

Gonzaga released her debut studio album I Am Alex G. (2015) with the studio album's lead hit single, "Panaginip Lang", under Star Music. The studio album had a grand launch at Eastwood Central Plaza on March 22, 2015, and a concert, AG from the East: The Unexpected Concert, which was later on held at the Araneta Coliseum to support her studio album on April 25, 2015. She had another major project as the lead star of the fantasy series Inday Bote, a TV adaptation of the classic Filipino film of the same title. She also took hosting duties in the original, local dance competition show Dance Kids, alongside Robi Domingo.

=== 2020–2023: Return to TV5 during the COVID-19 pandemic ===
After the shutdown of ABS-CBN and loss of the network's franchise, Gonzaga returned to TV5 and was one of the main hosts of Brightlight Productions's variety show Lunch Out Loud (Tropang LOL), which aired from October 2020 to April 2023.

== Filmography ==
=== Film ===
Year	Title	Role	Notes	Ref.
2007	I've Fallen For You	Samantha	Film debut	
2014	The Amazing Praybeyt Benjamin	Gundina Galamiton	Official entry for the 40th Metro Manila Film Festival	
2015	Buy Now, Die Later	Chloe Narciso	Official entry for the 41st Metro Manila Film Festival	
2016	My Rebound Girl	Rocky		
2018	Nakalimutan Ko Nang Kalimutan Ka	Jaz Cruz		
2018	Everybody Loves Baby Wendy	Wendy	iWant film	
2018	Mary, Marry Me	Mary Anne "MA" Lagman	Official entry for the 44th Metro Manila Film Festival	
2020	Love the Way U Lie	Stacey Likauko	Netflix Film and Viva Films	
2021	The Exorsis	Daniella "Dani" Raymundo Morales	Viva Films; official entry for the 47th Metro Manila Film Festival	
2022	The Entitled	Belinda Buenavista	Netflix Film	
2023	Single Bells	Rose Ann	TinCan Productions, Black Cap Pictures, & GMA Pictures; Main role	

=== Television ===
Year	Title	Role
2006–2007	Let's Go!	Alex Sy
2007	Gokada Go!	Alex Sy
2007	Pangarap na Bituin	Chorva Ayala-Gomez
2007	Your Song Presents: Sana Ngayong Pasko	Anna
2008	My Girl	Christine
2008	Your Song Presents: Without You	Jen
2008	Mars Ravelo and Jim Fernandez's Tiny Tony	Michelle
2008	Maynila	Various roles
2008–2009	Lokomoko	Various roles
2008–2009	Your Song Presents: My Only Hope	Cefelita "Fifi" Madrigal
2009–2010	Everybody Hapi	Cathy
2010–2011	BFGF	Maria Claridad "Claring" Malinao
2011	Babaeng Hampaslupa	Grace Mallari Wong / Elizabeth Wong-See
2011	Regal Shocker: Piano	Amanda
2011–2012	P. S. I Love You	Andrea Tuazon
2012	Regal Shocker: Manananggal	Rina
2012–2013	Enchanted Garden	Diwani Olivia / Aya Malfora
2013	Toda Max	Laila
2013	Maalaala Mo Kaya	Various roles
2013–2015	Banana Split	Various roles
2013–2015	The Voice of the Philippines	Host
2013–2020	ASAP	Host / Performer
2014	Pinoy Big Brother: All In	House guest
2014	The Voice Kids	Host
2014	Pure Love	Diane Santos
2015	Pablo S. Gomez's Inday Bote	Inday Catacutan
2015–2016	Dance Kids	Host
2016	Pasión de Amor	Jenny (finale episode)
2016	Game ng Bayan	Host
2017	I Can Do That	Host
2017–2020	I Can See Your Voice	Sing-vestigator
2018	Star Hunt: The Grand Audition Show	Host
2018–2019	Pinoy Big Brother: Otso	Host
2019–2020	Home Sweetie Home: Extra Sweet	Mikee Montes
2020	The Voice Teens	Host
2020–2023	Lunch Out Loud	Host
2021–present	Alex Asks	Host
2025–present	Eat Bulaga!	Guest Co-Host / Performer
2025–present	Vibe	Guest Co-Host / Performer

=== Music videos ===
List of music videos as lead artist, showing year released and directors
Title	Year	Director(s)	Ref.
"Panaginip Lang"	2015	Andrei Antonio	
"Break Na Tayo"	2015	Jasper Salimbangon	
"Unbound" (with Marion, Morissette and Kidwolf)	2016	Frannk Lloyd Mamaril	
"Chambe"	2018	Jasper Salimbangon	
"Chambe" (Christmas remix)	2018	Jasper Salimbangon	
"Sissums" (with Toni Gonzaga)	2018	Jasper Salimbangon	
"Tipints"	2019	Fifth Solomon	
"Please Lang" (featuring Toni Gonzaga)	2019	Jasper Salimbangon	
"G" (featuring Perea Street)	2019	Jasper Salimbangon	
"Amfee"	2019	Jasper Salimbangon	
"Amfee" (Performance video)	2019	Jasper Salimbangon	
"Amfee" (Vertical video)	2019	Jasper Salimbangon	
"WKT" (featuring Arvey)	2021	Alex Gonzaga and Edrex Clyde Sanchez	

== Discography ==
=== Extended plays ===
List of extended plays, with selected details
Title	Details
I Am Alex G.	Released: 2015; Label: Star Music; Format: Digital download, 12"; Track listing: 1. "Panaginip Lang"; 2. "Di Ko Akalain"; 3. "Alam Mo Na Yan"; 4. "Boyfriend"; 5. "Break Na Tayo"; 6. "Goodbye Kiss"

=== Singles ===
List of singles, showing year released and album name
Title	Year	Album
"Panaginip Lang"	2015	I Am Alex G.
"Break Na Tayo"	2015	I Am Alex G.
"Chambe"	2018	Non-album single
"Sissums" (with Toni Gonzaga)	2018	Mary, Marry Me OST
"Tipints"	2019	Non-album single
"Please Lang" (featuring Toni Gonzaga)	2019	Himig Handog
"Amfee"	2019	Non-album singles
"WKT" (featuring Arvey)	2021	Non-album singles
"Kaba"	2025	Non-album single
"Pasulyap-Sulyap"	2024	Non-album single
"Tipints" (featuring Cursebox)	2024	Non-album single
"AG Back Again"	2024	Non-album single
"Swerte"	2023	Non-album single
"Unbound" (Marion featuring Alex Gonzaga, Morissette and Kidwolf)	2016	Non-album single

=== Chart performance ===
List of other charted songs, with selected chart positions and album name
Title	Year	Peak chart positions		Album
Title	Year	PH		Album
Title	Year	Myx Hit Chart	Pinoy Myx Countdown	Album
"Panaginip Lang"	2015	8	6	I Am Alex G.
"Chambe"	2018	8	5	Non-album single
"Tipints"	2019	—	16	Non-album single
"Amfee"	2019	—	16	Non-album single

== Concerts ==
Year	Title	Details	Notes	Ref.
2015	AG from the East: The Unexpected Concert	Date: April 25, 2015; Venue: Smart Araneta Colliseum		

== Written works ==
- Dear Alex, Break na Kami. Paano? Love Catherine (2014)
- Dear Alex, We're Dating. Tama, Mali?! Love Catherine (2016)
- Sissums (2018)

== Awards and nominations ==
Year	Award giving body	Category	Nominated work	Results	Ref.
2013	27th PMPC Star Awards for TV	Best Comedy Actress	Banana Nite	Nominated	
2013	27th PMPC Star Awards for TV	Best Talent Search Program Hosts	The Voice Kids	Won	
2013	Anak TV Awards	Makabata Stars	—N/a	Won	
2014	28th PMPC Star Awards for TV	Best Talent Search Program Hosts	The Voice of the Philippines	Won	
2014	28th PMPC Star Awards for TV	Best Comedy Actress	Banana Nite	Nominated	
2016	12th USTv Awards	Students' Choice of Reality/Game Show Host	The Voice Kids	Won	
2016	Anak TV Awards	Makabata Stars	—N/a	Won	
2019	MOR Pinoy Music Awards	LSS Hit of the Year	"Chambe"	Nominated	
2019	PMPC Star Awards for Music	Female Recording Artist of the Year	"Chambe"	Nominated	
2019	PMPC Star Awards for Music	Song of the Year	"Chambe"	Nominated	
2020	Eastwood City Walk Of Fame	Celebrity Inductee	—N/a	Won	
2020	PUSH Awards	Popular Digital Star	—N/a	Won	
2020	2nd VP Choice Awards	YouTuber of the Year	—N/a	Won	
2020	CICP Spotlight Awards	YouTube Superstar	—N/a	Won	
