= Happy Together (Philippine TV series) =

Philippine television sitcom series

- Title card
- Genre: Sitcom
- Created by: Edgar "Bobot" Mortiz
- Directed by: Edgar "Bobot" Mortiz
- Creative director: John Lloyd Cruz
- Starring: John Lloyd Cruz
- Country of origin: Philippines
- Original language: Tagalog
- No. of seasons: 3
- No. of episodes: 74

Production
- Executive producer: Joy Dulce
- Production locations: GMA Network Studios, EDSA corner Timog Avenue, Quezon City, Philippines
- Camera setup: Multiple-camera setup
- Running time: 60 minutes
- Production companies: GMA Entertainment Group; Wacky Solution Productions

Original release
- Network: GMA Network
- Release: December 26, 2021 – August 6, 2023

Happy Together (pronounced as Happy to Get Her) is a Philippine television sitcom series broadcast by GMA Network. Directed by Edgar Mortiz, it stars John Lloyd Cruz. It premiered on December 26, 2021, on the network's Sunday Grande sa Gabi line up. The series concluded on August 6, 2023, with a total of three seasons and 74 episodes.

== Cast and characters ==
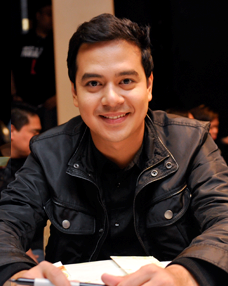
John Lloyd Cruz portrays Julian Rodriguez.

Lead cast

- John Lloyd Cruz as Julian Rodriguez

Supporting cast

- Miles Ocampo as Elizabeth "Liz" Rodriguez (season 1–2)
- Jayson Gainza as Mike Escaño
- Eric Nicolas as Anton (season 1–2)
- Carmi Martin as Crispina "Pining" Y. Rodriguez (season 1–2)
- Janus del Prado as T.G.
- Ashley Rivera as Regina "Pam" Ferrer
- Kleggy Abaya as Kanor
- Vito Quizon as Joselito "Joey" Rodriguez
- Leo Bruno as Oscar "Oca" Escaño (season 1–2; guest season 3)
- Wally Waley as Andy
- Arra San Agustin as Shelly (season 3; recurring season 1–2)
- Ana Jalandoni as Eba (season 3; recurring season 1–2)
- Jenzel Angeles as Rocky

Recurring cast

- Julie Anne San Jose as Anna Roberto
- Jobert Austria as Bart
- Empoy Marquez as Emmanuel "Emman" Arturo
- Cessa Moncera as Minzy
- Nonong Ballinan as Cardo Silvestre
- Nour Hooshmand as Belle
- Miko Peñaloza as Shaq
- Liezel Lopez as MJ

== Ratings ==
According to AGB Nielsen Philippines' Nationwide Urban Television Audience Measurement People in television homes, the pilot episode of Happy Together earned a 12% rating.
