= Goin' Bananas (TV series) =

Philippine variety show

- Also known as: Still Going Bananas
- Genre: Sitcom Sketch comedy Variety show
- Directed by: Al Quinn
- Starring: Christopher de Leon; Edgar Mortiz; Jay Ilagan; Johnny Delgado; Al Tantay
- Opening theme: "Mick's Blessings" by Style Council
- Country of origin: Philippines
- Original language: Filipino

Production
- Executive producer: Gilbert G. Perez
- Camera setup: Multiple-camera setup
- Running time: 60 minutes (1986–1988, 1991-1992); 90 minutes (1988–1991)
- Production companies: IBC Entertainment Group (1986–1987); ABS-CBN Studios (1987–1992); Banana Co.

Original release
- Network: BBC (1985–1986); IBC (1986–1987); ABS-CBN (1987–1992)
- Release: October 6, 1985 – January 4, 1992

Related
- Goin' Bulilit; Banana Sundae

Goin' Bananas (also known as Still Goin' Bananas) is a Philippine television sketch comedy show broadcast by BBC, IBC and ABS-CBN. Directed by Al Quinn, it stars Christopher de Leon, Edgar Mortiz, Jay Ilagan, Johnny Delgado and Al Tantay. It aired on October 6, 1985 to January 4, 1992.

== Cast ==
=== Bad Bananas ===
- Christopher de Leon (1986–1989)
- Edgar Mortiz (1986–1992)
- Jay Ilagan † (1986–1992)
- Johnny Delgado † (1986–1992)
- Al Tantay (1986–1987)

=== Featuring ===
- Zorayda Sanchez †
- Whitney Tyson
- Boy Derasin
- Mar Gutierrez
- Romy Santos
- Angela Luz
- Monica Herrera
- Brandy Ayala
- Bentong †

== See also ==
- Goin' Bulilit
- Banana Sundae
- List of programs broadcast by ABS-CBN
