= Goin' Bulilit =

Philippine television sketch comedy show

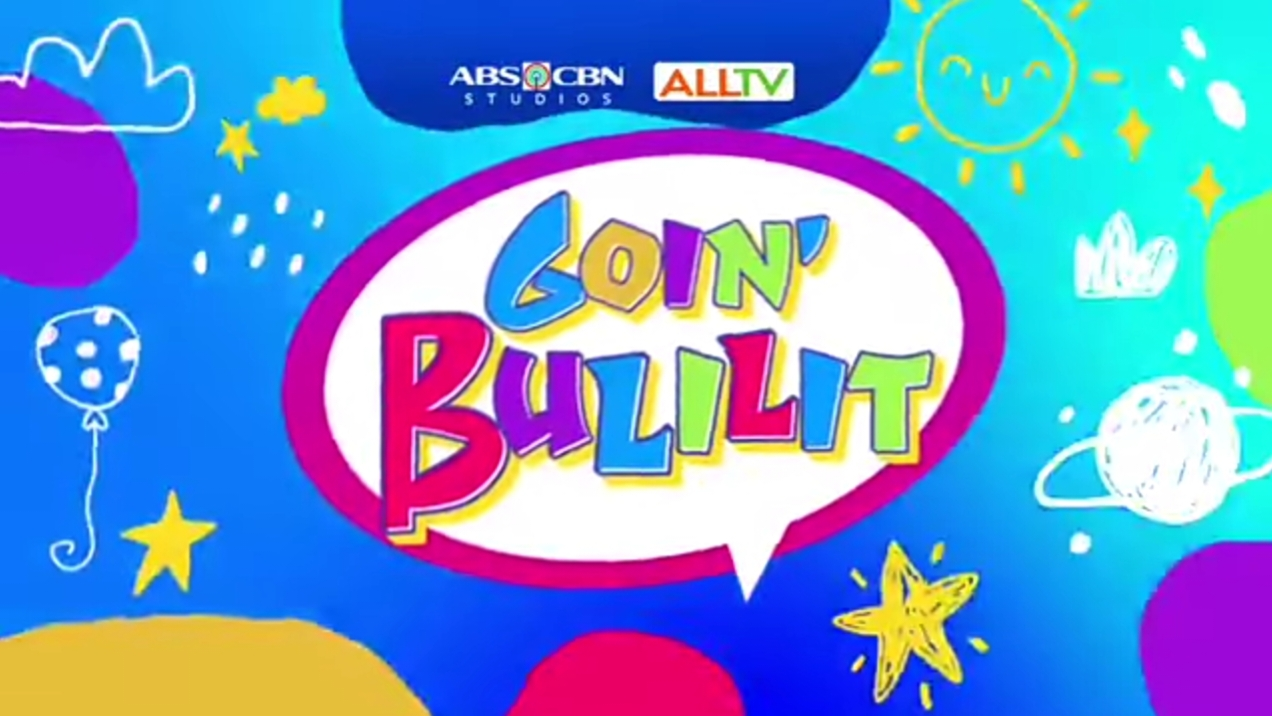
- Title card
- Also known as: The Best of Goin' Bulilit
- Genre: Children's show Sketch comedy Variety show Family
- Created by: ABS-CBN Studios; Edgar "Bobot" Mortiz
- Written by: Josel Garlitos; Victor Anastacio; Sherwin Buenavenida; Alex Calleja; GB Labrador; Badjie Mortiz; Toffie Runas; Ronald Allan Habon
- Directed by: Edgar "Bobot" Mortiz (2005–2019, 2024); Badjie Mortiz (2005–2019, 2024); Frasco Mortiz (2005–2019, 2024); Carl John Barrameda (2024)
- Creative director: Ricky Victoria
- Starring: See cast
- Theme music composer: Mel Villena
- Opening theme: "Goin' Bulilit" theme song by Goin' Bulilit cast
- Ending theme: "Goin' Bulilit" theme song (instrumental)
- Country of origin: Philippines
- Original languages: Filipino (main); English (secondary)
- No. of seasons: All seasons: 9; 2005–2019; 8 seasons 2024; 1 season
- No. of episodes: 684

Production
- Executive producers: Eugenio G. Lopez III (2005–13); Charo Santos-Concio (2013–16); Carlo L. Katigbak (2016–19, 2024); Cory V. Vidanes; Laurenti M. Dyogi
- Producer: Nomie Meraña
- Production locations: Studio 5, ABS-CBN Broadcasting Center, Sgt. Esguerra Avenue corner Mother Ignacia Street, Diliman, Quezon City, Philippines
- Editor: Joseph Karl Mayshle
- Camera setup: Multiple-camera setup
- Running time: 45 minutes (2005–19); 35–40 minutes (2024)
- Production company: ABS-CBN Studios

Original release
- Network: ABS-CBN
- Release: February 6, 2005 – August 4, 2019
- Network: Kapamilya Channel (Note: The show also aired on A2Z, All TV and TFC. It was also available on-demand via Kapamilya Online Live and iWant.)
- Release: July 1 – September 27, 2024

Related
- Goin' Bananas; Banana Sundae; Sunday 'Kada

Goin' Bulilit (lit. 'goin' little'; abbreviated as GB) is a Philippine television sketch comedy show broadcast by ABS-CBN and Kapamilya Channel. Directed by Edgar "Bobot" Mortiz, Badjie S. Mortiz and Frasco S. Mortiz, it premiered on February 6, 2005 on the network's Yes Weekend! line up. The show concluded on August 4, 2019. The show returned on the network's Kapamilya Gold line up from July 1 to September 27, 2024.

== Overview ==
Goin' Bulilit premiered on February 6, 2005. The show was a spin-off of the 1980s comedy sitcom Goin' Bananas, which starred Christopher de Leon, Edgar Mortiz, Jay Ilagan, and Johnny Delgado.

In 2015, Goin' Bulilit celebrated its 10th anniversary with the participation of both former and current cast members.

The show aired the final episode of its first eight seasons on ABS-CBN on August 4, 2019. The show's first 8 seasons were re-aired on A2Z, Jeepney TV and Kapamilya Channel (until October 21, 2023) from October 9, 2021 to June 16, 2024.

On May 21, 2024, ABS-CBN announced that Goin' Bulilit would return for a 9th season, nearly five years after the show's original run ended in 2019. Auditions for the new cast members were held on May 25. It was also announced that It's Showtime Kids featuring Argus, Briseis, Enicka, Imogen, Kelsey, Kulot, and Jaze, would be joining the program. Co-produced by ABS-CBN Studios and All TV, the show returned on Kapamilya Channel, with simulcasts on A2Z, and All TV on July 1. The 9th season concluded on September 27, 2024.

== Cast ==
The original cast of Goin' Bulilit consisted of Kathryn Bernardo, Miles Ocampo, Sharlene San Pedro, Kristel Fulgar, Igi Boy Flores, Julia Montes, Jane Oineza, Nash Aguas, CJ Navato, Kiray Celis, and Hopia.

== Merchandise ==
=== DVD ===
The Best of Goin' Bulilit was released on December 27, 2007, featuring highlights from the first 100 episodes of Goin' Bulilit. The DVD includes the show's best segments, parodies and sketches, such as "Rekolilit," "Noon at Ngayon," "Hinulugang Taktak," "Mahal Mo Ba Ako?", "Lovers in Pares," "Rated KKK," "Ginulungang Palad," and "GB Patrol." It also features a bonus section with bloopers, a "Best Funny Faces" compilation, and interviews with the kids.

== Accolades ==
Year	Award-Giving Body	Category	Result	Ref.
2005	PMPC Star Awards for TV 2005 Winners	Best Gag Show (tied with Bubble Gang)	Won	
2006	12th KBP Golden Dove Awards	Best Comedy Program	Won	
2007	29th Catholic Mass Media Awards	Best Comedy Show	Won	
2007	21st PMPC Star Awards for TV	Best Gag Show	Nominated	
2008	6th Gawad TANGLAW	Best Comedy Program	Won	
2008	22nd PMPC Star Awards for TV	Best Gag Show	Won	
2008	22nd PMPC Star Awards for TV	Best Comedy Actress (Sharlene San Pedro)	Nominated	
2009	7th Gawad TANGLAW	Best Comedy Program	Won	
2009	23rd PMPC Star Awards for TV	Best Gag Show	Nominated	
2009	23rd PMPC Star Awards for TV	Best Comedy Actress (Sharlene San Pedro)	Nominated	
2010	8th Gawad TANGLAW	Best Comedy/Gag Show (tied with Banana Split)	Won	
2011	25th PMPC Star Awards for TV	Best Gag Show	Nominated	
2012	26th PMPC Star Awards for TV	Best Gag Show	Nominated	
2012	26th PMPC Star Awards for TV	Best New Male TV Personality (Harvey Bautista)	Nominated	
2013	27th PMPC Star Awards for TV	Best Gag Show	Nominated	
2013	27th PMPC Star Awards for TV	Best New Female TV Personality (Aaliyah Belmoro)	Nominated	
2013	27th PMPC Star Awards for TV	Best New Female TV Personality (Ashley Sarmiento)	Nominated	
2014	22nd KBP Golden Dove Awards	Best TV Comedy Program	Won	
2014	28th PMPC Star Awards for TV	Best Gag Show	Won	
2014	28th PMPC Star Awards for TV	Best Comedy Actor (Harvey Bautista)	Nominated	
2014	28th PMPC Star Awards for TV	Best Comedy Actor (Bugoy Cariño)	Nominated	
2014	28th PMPC Star Awards for TV	Best Comedy Actor (Clarence Delgado)	Nominated	
2015	29th PMPC Star Awards for TV	Best Gag Show	Nominated	
2015	29th PMPC Star Awards for TV	Best Comedy Actor (Clarence Delgado)	Nominated	
2015	29th PMPC Star Awards for TV	Best Comedy Actress (Mutya Orquia)	Nominated	
2016	30th PMPC Star Awards for TV	Best Gag Show	Won	
2016	24th KBP Golden Dove Awards	Best TV Comedy Program	Won	
2017	31st PMPC Star Awards for TV	Best Gag Show	Won	
2018	32nd PMPC Star Awards for TV	Best Gag Show	Won	
2024	2024 Trusted Business Awards	Best Longest Running Kids Comedy Show	Won	
