= Johnny Manahan =

Filipino film and television director

- Born: Juan Ledesma Manahan; 11 February 1947 (age 79); Bacolod, Negros Occidental, Philippines
- Other names: Mr. M, Mr. Mystery Man
- Education: University of California, Berkeley (BA)
- Occupations: Director; actor; screenwriter; talent manager
- Years active: 1971–present
- Employers: GMA Network Inc. (1970s–1980s, 2021–2025); Radio Philippines Network (1970s–1980s); Intercontinental Broadcasting Corporation (1979–1987); Banahaw Broadcasting Corporation (1983–1986); ABS-CBN Corporation (1986–2020); Brightlight Productions (2020–present); TV5 Network (2025–present)

Juan "Johnny" Ledesma Manahan (born February 11, 1947), also known as Mr. M, is a Filipino film and television director, actor, talent manager, screenwriter, and media executive. He is known for scouting and managing actors, having been served as VP and managing director for ABS-CBN's Star Magic (formerly Discovery and Talent Center) and head of ABS-CBN Studios until 2020, as well as the former senior vice-president of ABS-CBN. Manahan worked as a consultant for Sparkle, GMA Network's talent management arm, until 2025.

== Early life and education ==
Manahan was born as Juan Ledesma Manahan on February 11, 1947, in Bacolod, Negros Occidental, Philippines. His parents were Dr. Constantino Perez Manahan and Elvira Ledesma Manahan, a socialite and television host (Two for the Road). Manahan attended high school at the Ateneo de Manila in 1964, and finished his studies at the University of California, Berkeley, AB Art History, in 1969.

Before becoming a director-manager, Manahan was a visual artist, painter, and sculptor. He received the "Special Citation" award at the Paris Biennale of Art in 1979.

== Career ==
Manahan began his career directing for television soon after his studies around 1971. He was a freelancer and directed shows for the various local channels such as Two for the Road (GMA), For the Boys (IBC), The Big Big Show (BBC/City2), and Kaluskos Musmos (RPN). Right after ABS-CBN re-opened in 1986, he was appointed as a resident director at the network. He directed the leading shows of the history of local television, such as Chika Chika Chicks, Palibhasa Lalake, Tonight with Dick and Carmi, Abangan Ang Susunod Na Kabanata, and I Am What I Am.

Manahan's mother, socialite and actress Elvira Manahan was killed on October 14, 1986.

Manahan, together with Lino Brocka, Charo Santos-Concio, and Freddie M. Garcia who was then ABS-CBN executive vice president and general manager, established Star Magic to create a stable of new stars exclusively for the network in 1988 as Discovery. This gave birth to Talent Center. In its early years, the Talent Center's project was Ang TV. The show auditioned thousands of people and accepted chosen ones into the program. The series soon led to mall shows, live concerts, and record albums. It also became a springboard for the careers of Claudine Barretto, Jolina Magdangal, Camille Prats, Victor Neri, Angelica Panganiban, Carlo Aquino, Angelu de Leon, Sarah Geronimo, Geoff Eigenmann, Rica Peralejo, Gio Alvarez, and Paolo Contis among others. The Talent Center continued its search through the launching vehicle Star Circle in 1995.

On February 5, 1992, Manahan assisted lawyer Miriam Defensor Santiago in setting up the first national convention of her People's Reform Party at the Araneta Coliseum.

While he was busy discovering and developing new talent, Manahan continued to direct television shows, movies, concerts, and specials. In particular, he directed the first collaboration of Martin Nievera and Gary Valenciano, a major concert in September 2009 at the Mall of Asia concert grounds, as well as concerts of international singers Barry Manilow, Diana Krall and Andrea Bocelli in the Philippines.

He is the man behind the television coverage of the Miss Earth pageants, the Christmas and anniversary specials of ABS-CBN, celebrity weddings and debut specials, election specials, and many more. In addition, he also managed the grand world tours and concerts outside the country which includes ASAP '05 in the U.S. and Japan, Wowowee in Las Vegas, Chicago and Hawaii, and the Star Magic World Tour in Canada and the U.S., among others.

Manahan held various positions in ABS-CBN management. He was the director in the Talent Center (1992-1994); program director in the Production Department (1994-1996); and vice president in the Talent Development & Management Center (1996-2003); senior vice president of ABS-CBN's Star Magic (2003-2007). He retired in 2007 but remained as head and consultant of Star Magic until 2020.

In 2020, following the closure of ABS-CBN for not having its franchise renewed by the congress and National Telecommunications Commission, Manahan signed up as Production Consultant with Brightlight Productions, an independent company owned by former Negros Occidental 3rd District Rep. Albee Benitez. Brightlight Productions secured a blocktime agreement with TV5, allowing Manahan to handle two variety shows: the daily noontime show Lunch Out Loud and the now-defunct Sunday noontime musical variety show Sunday Noontime Live!. Following his departure, Joane Laygo, who was an assistant director in ASAP, replaced Manahan as the director of ASAP.

In July 2021, Manahan returned to GMA Network by joining its talent management arm, GMA Artist Center as a consultant. The said agency is later rebranded as Sparkle in January 2022.

In November 2025, Manahan signed with TV5 Network's MQuest Ventures and Star Worx (formerly MQuest Artists Agency).

== Legacy ==
Manahan was a mentor to a number of people who went on to become well-known in show business in the Philippines; among these are current and former ABS-CBN/Star Magic talents Piolo Pascual, Claudine Barretto, Jolina Magdangal, Marvin Agustin, Carlo Aquino, Camille Prats, Patrick Garcia, Darren Espanto, Paolo Contis, Angelica Panganiban, Sarah Geronimo, Sam Milby, Melai Cantiveros, Dimples Romana, Denise Laurel, Diether Ocampo, Rica Peralejo, Heaven Peralejo, Jerome Ponce, Baron Geisler, Jodi Sta. Maria, Bea Alonzo, Winnie Cordero, Andrea Brillantes, Enrique Gil, Kyle Echarri, Francine Diaz, Seth Fedelin, Andrei Felix, Geoff Eigenmann, Heart Evangelista, Kim Chiu, Gerald Anderson, John Lloyd Cruz, Nash Aguas, Sharlene San Pedro, Zaijian Jaranilla, Xyriel Manabat, Mutya Orquia, Raikko Mateo, Marco Masa, Heart Ramos, Jana Agoncillo, and Enzo Pelojero.

On March 16, 2024, a surprise party titled Night of 100 Stars, a tribute to Manahan's 77th birthday on February, held at Newport World Resorts, was a reunion for the nation’s top stars.

== Filmography ==
=== Pre-resident director ===
from 1971 to 1986

As director

- Love Me from What I Am: Maricel Soriano (1985)
- The Big, Big Show
- Mana
- 2+2
- Julian Talisman
- Kaluskos Musmos
- Alab ng Lahi
- Model
- Musmos Pa si Boss
- For the Boys

As guest director

- Two for the Road
- In the Money
- Mga Kwento ni Lola
- Dina (BBC 2)
- Late Hour with June & Johnny
- Kuarta o Kahon
- Love Me For What I Am: Maricel Soriano
- The Sharon Cuneta Show

=== As director ===
Film

Year	Title
1989	Si Aida, Si Lorna, O Si Fe
1993	Home Along da Riles: Da Movie
1996	Ang TV Movie: The Adarna Adventure
1999	Wansapanataym: The Movie
1999	Oo Na, Mahal Na Kung Mahal

Television series

Year	Title
1984–1991	Chika Chika Chicks
1987–1998	Palibhasa Lalake
1989–1995	Sa Linggo nAPO Sila
1991–1997	Abangan ang Susunod Na Kabanata
1992–1997	Ang TV
1992–1997	Home Along Da Riles
1993–2000	Oki Doki Doc
1997	Kaya ni Mister, Kaya ni Misis
1997–2000	Wansapanataym
2001	Da Pilya en da Pilot
2001	Eto Na Ang Susunod Na Kabanata
2002–2003	Klasmeyts
2005–2006	Bora: Sons of the Beach
2003–2007	Lagot Ka, Isusumbong Kita
2006	Komiks: "Bampy" episode
2008	I Am KC: "Love 2 Dance" episode

Reality and variety shows

Year	Title
1988	Tonight with Dick and Carmi
1995–2020	ASAP
2003	Masayang Tanghali Bayan!
2005	Wowowee
2006	Sharon
2010	Shoutout!
2010	Pilipinas Win Na Win
2010	Star Power
2011	Happy Yipee Yehey!
2012	The X Factor Philippines
2013–19	Minute to Win It
2013–15	The Voice of the Philippines
2014–19; 2024	The Voice Kids
2015–16	I Love OPM
2017–20	The Voice Teens
2020–21	Lunch Out Loud
2020–21	Sunday Noontime Live!
2023	The Voice Generations
2025	Stars on the Floor

Specials

Year	Title
2005	Bea's Wildest Dreams at 18: Birthday TV Special
2006	Ang Pagbabalik ng Bituin: A Mega Celebration
2008	Martin Nievera's Martin XXV
2008	Lea: My Life... On Stage!
2009	Sharon Cuneta's Mega 30
2010	Bench: Uncut: A Bold Look at the Future
2011	Binibining Pilipinas 2011: The Pageant
2012	Binibining Pilipinas 2012
2012	Bench: Universe
2012	Miss Philippines Earth 2012
2013	Binibining Pilipinas Gold: The 2013 Pageant
2014	Binibining Pilipinas 2014: The Grand Coronation Night

=== As an actor ===
Film

Year	Film	Character/Role
1996	Ang TV Movie: The Adarna Adventure	Head Tulisan
1998	Ang Babae sa Bintana	
2006	The Bet Collector	Mang Poldo

=== As a writer ===
Works

Year	Title
1996	Ang TV Movie: The Adarna Adventure
2002	Kung Ikaw ay Isang Panaginip
2005	Bea's Wildest Dreams at 18: Birthday TV Special

== Awards ==
Year	Award-giving body	Category	Work	Result
1979	Paris Biennale of Art	Special Citation award		Won
2009	PMPC Star Awards for TV	Ading Fernando Lifetime Achievement Award		Won
