= Mikee Morada =

Filipino politician (born 1987)

The Honourable Mikee Morada
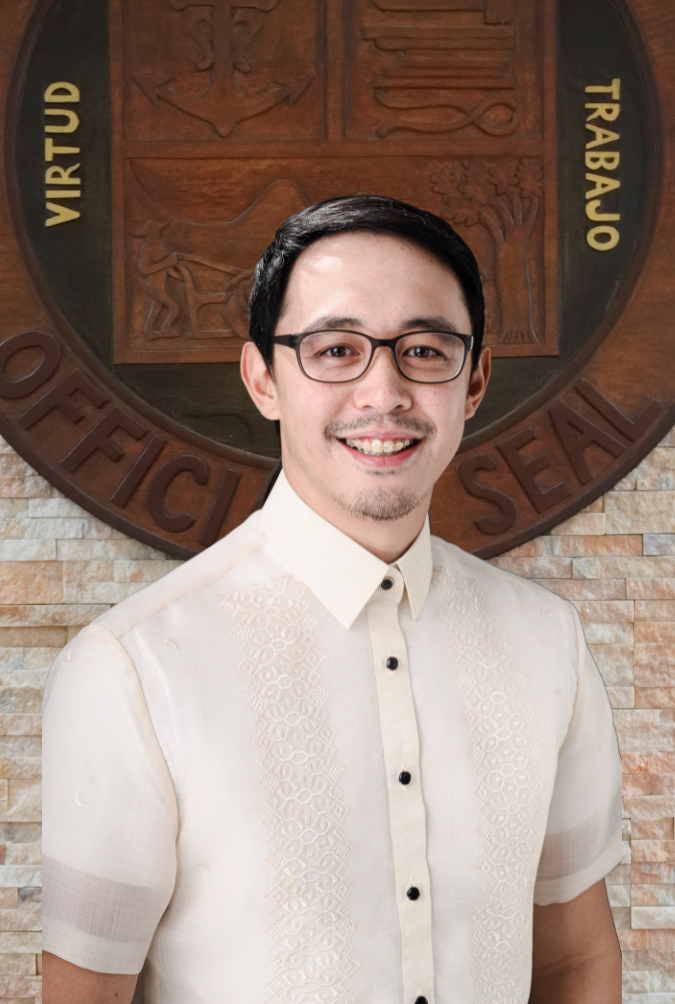
- Official portrait

Vice Mayor of Lipa, Batangas
- Incumbent
- Assumed office June 30, 2025
- Mayor: Eric Africa
- Preceded by: Camille Lopez

Member of the Lipa City Council
- In office June 30, 2019 – June 30, 2025

Personal details
- Born: Michael Gerard Morada; April 18, 1987 (age 39) Trenton, New Jersey, U.S.
- Citizenship: Philippines; United States
- Party: Nacionalista (2019–present)
- Spouse: Alex Gonzaga (m. 2020)
- Children: 1
- Relatives: Toni Gonzaga (sister-in-law)
- Education: De La Salle University; University of California, Los Angeles
- Occupation: Politician
- Website: Lipa City Government Directories

Michael Gerard Tantoco Morada (born April 18, 1987) is a Filipino politician who currently serves as the vice mayor of Lipa, Batangas since 2025. He previously served as a city councilor of Lipa from 2019 to 2025.

Morada and television personality Alex Gonzaga became a couple in October 2016 and eventually married in November 2020.

== See also ==
- 2022 Batangas local elections
- 2025 Batangas local elections
