= I Can Do That (Philippine TV series) =

- Genre: Reality competition
- Created by: Armoza Formats
- Directed by: Arnel Natividad
- Presented by: Robi Domingo; Alex Gonzaga
- Country of origin: Philippines
- Original language: Filipino
- No. of seasons: 1
- No. of episodes: 25

Production
- Executive producer: Marvi Manikan-Gelito
- Running time: 60 minutes (Saturdays); 45 minutes (Sundays)
- Production companies: ABS-CBN Studios; Armoza Formats; Universal Television

Original release
- Network: ABS-CBN
- Release: March 11 – June 4, 2017

Related
- I Can Do That! (United States)

I Can Do That is a Philippine television reality competition show broadcast by ABS-CBN. The show is based on the Israeli show of the same title. Hosted by Robi Domingo and Alex Gonzaga, it aired on the network's Yes Weekend line up from March 11, 2017, to June 4, 2017, replacing Pinoy Big Brother: Lucky Season 7 and was replaced by Lethal Weapon.

Wacky Kiray was crowned as the first Greatest Entertainer on June 4, 2017, beating Cristine Reyes by a margin of 10.66%.

== Format ==
Eight celebrities, referred to as iCANdidates, showcase their talents every week with different entertainment acts that performers perfected for years. Together with the guest performers, they will learn the skills needed and rehearse the act for a week. After one week of training, they perform their acts in front of a studio audience, with the public and fellow iCANdidates voting on the best performance of the week. At the end of 12 weeks, the celebrity with the most points from the judges earns a trophy, 1 million pesos, and the title of "The Greatest Entertainer".

=== Selection of Acts ===
At the start of the show, the guest entertainers perform their act on stage. If the iCANdidate likes what they see and wants to perform the act on the next episode, they must go down the iCAN steps. They may only do so once the sound and lighting cue flashes. The first iCANdidate at the last step locks in the act. Afterwards, the iCANdidate picks his or her partner in the act. If no one locks in the act after the performance, the hosts have the power to choose one iCANdidate who will perform it next week. The chosen contestant still gets to pick his or her partner. The process repeats until all iCANdidates are assigned to an act. The last act is automatically assigned to the remaining iCANdidates who were not able to choose an act.

=== Scoring system ===
After all iCANdidates have performed, the iCANdidates rank the acts through their smartphone — 3 points for the first place, 2 for second, and 1 for third; they may not vote for their own act. Once the iCANdidates have finished voting, the audience votes for the act they liked best. The act with the most votes from the audience receives 3 points. The audience vote is only valid if the majority of the audience voted (51%).

The act with the highest combined points from iCANdidates and audience becomes the "Entertainer of the Week" and receives ₱50,000.

=== Elimination ===
During a particular week, the two (three in double elimination week) iCANdidates with the lowest cumulative points are declared eCANdidate (short for elimination candidate) and hereby nominated for elimination. After a short message from each eCANdidate, the audience votes for who they want to save. The eCANdidate with the highest percent of votes is saved; the other eCANdidates are eliminated.

== Contestants ==
- Arci Muñoz, actress and singer with Philia
- Cristine Reyes, actress on Kristine and Reputasyon
- Daniel Matsunaga, Brazilian model, actor, footballer, host, businessman
- Gabriel Valenciano, dancer, musician, YouTube star
- JC Santos, actor on Till I Met You
- Wacky Kiray, stand-up comedian
- Pokwang, actress/comedian
- Sue Ramirez, actress

== Competition summary ==
The table below shows the corresponding points and rank earned by the celebrity contestants each week.

Legend

- Winner
- Runner-up
- Third place
- Fourth place
- Top 4 contestants with the highest final total points
- Eliminated contestants with the lowest final total points
- Contestant won that particular week
- Contestant placed last that particular week
- Contestant withdrew from the competition

Contestant	Week 1	Week 2	Week 3	Week 4	Week 5	Week 6	Week 7	Week 8	Week 9	Week 10	Week 11	Final Total Points	Finals
Wacky Kiray	2nd 13 points	3rd 13 points	2nd 14 points	3rd/4th 11 points	3rd 11 points	1st 9 points	2nd 15 points	2nd/3rd/4th 3 points	4th/5th/6th/7th 2 points	2nd/3rd 3 points	1st 19 points	113	93.75%
Cristine	2nd 13 points	1st/2nd 16 points	1st 20 points	2nd 14 points	4th 8 points	2nd 3 points	1st 19 points	2nd/3rd/4th 3 points	4th/5th/6th/7th 2 points	4th/5th/6th/7th 2 points	4th 8 points	108	83.09%
Daniel	1st 17 points	1st/2nd 16 points	3rd 11 points	3rd/4th 11 points	1st 17 points	2nd 3 points	1st 19 points	5th/6th/7th 2 points	4th/5th/6th/7th 2 points	4th/5th/6th/7th 2 points	3rd 9 points	109	47.81%
Gab	3rd 11 points	1st/2nd 16 points	3rd 11 points	3rd/4th 11 points	2nd 15 points	2nd 3 points	2nd 15 points	2nd/3rd/4th 3 points	2nd/3rd 3 points	4th/5th/6th/7th 2 points	2nd 12 points	102	44.44%
Sue	4th 10 points	1st/2nd 16 points	4th 6 points	1st 15 points	2nd 15 points	1st 9 points	3rd 9 points	1st 6 points	2nd/3rd 3 points	4th/5th/6th/7th 2 points	5th 5 points	96	Eliminated; Week 11
Arci	1st 17 points	4th 6 points	1st 20 points	1st 15 points	3rd 11 points	2nd 3 points	4th 8 points	5th/6th/7th 2 points	4th/5th/6th/7th 2 points	1st 6 points	Eliminated; Week 10	90	Eliminated; Week 10
JC	4th 10 points	4th 6 points	2nd 14 points	2nd 14 points	1st 17 points	1st 9 points	3rd 9 points	5th/6th/7th 2 points	1st 6 points	2nd/3rd 3 points	Eliminated; Week 10	90	Eliminated; Week 10
Pokwang	3rd 11 points	3rd 13 points	4th 6 points	3rd/4th 11 points	4th 8 points	1st 9 points	4th 8 points	Withdrew; Week 7				66	Withdrew; Week 7

== Elimination ==
=== Week 7 (April 29) ===
eCANdidate	Audience Votes	Result
JC	—	Safe
Pokwang	—	Withdrew^{a}

Note
a. eCANdidates were asked to give their message and ask for support from the audience before the voting process. Instead of asking to support her, Pokwang told the audience not to vote for her and to vote for JC instead.

=== Week 10 (May 20 & 21) ===
eCANdidate	Audience Votes	Result
Gab	49.23%	Safe
JC	30.77%	Eliminated
Arci	20.00%	Eliminated

=== Week 11 (May 28) ===
eCANdidate	Audience Votes	Result
Gab	57.38%	Safe
Sue	42.62%	Eliminated

== Group Performances ==
=== Week 1 (March 11 & 12) ===
Order	Contestants	AKA	Act	Guest Act	Points			Rank
Order	Contestants	AKA	Act	Guest Act	ICANdidates' Score	Audience's Score	Total	Rank
1	Gab and Pokwang	GabWang	Jump Rope	Next Level Octomix	11	0	11	3rd
2	Arci and Daniel	DArci	Aerial Dance	Power Duo	14	3	17	1st
3	Cristine and Kiray	AaRay	Comedy	Pabeki Gays	13	0	13	2nd
4	JC and Sue	SueC	Comic Juggling	Atienza Brothers	10	0	10	4th

=== Week 2 (March 18 & 19) ===
Order	Contestants	AKA	Act	Guest Act	Points			Rank
Order	Contestants	AKA	Act	Guest Act	ICANdidates' Score	Audience's Score	Total	Rank
1	Kiray and Pokwang	PokRay	Wheelchair Dance	BMG Wheelchair Dancesport	13	0	13	3rd
2	Cristine and Daniel	CrisNiel	Chinese Yoyo	Spyros	13	3	16	1st/2nd
3	Gab and Sue	SueGab	Aerial Hoop Dance	BeastFam Aerialists	16	0	16	1st/2nd
4	Arci and JC	ArJC	Plate Balancing	Extreme Plate Balancer	6	0	6	4th

=== Week 3 (March 25 & 26) ===
Order	Contestants	AKA	Act	Guest Act	Points			Rank
Order	Contestants	AKA	Act	Guest Act	ICANdidates' Score	Audience's Score	Total	Rank
1	Daniel and Gab	GabNiel	Human Pyramid Acrobat	Triple K Acrobats	11	0	11	3rd
2	Pokwang and Sue	SuWang	Belly Dancing	Jill Ngo	6	0	6	4th
3	JC and Kiray	JCRay	Magical Flow Art	Raymond Capino	14	0	14	2nd
4	Arci and Cristine	ArTine	Flying Sexy Dance	Philippine Genesis	17	3	20	1st

=== Week 4 (April 1 & 2) ===
Order	Contestants	AKA	Act	Guest Act	Points			Rank
Order	Contestants	AKA	Act	Guest Act	ICANdidates' Score	Audience's Score	Total	Rank
1	JC and Cristine	JCTine	Pole Dancing	Luningning	14	0	14	2nd
2	Pokwang and Daniel	DanWang	Foot Ladder Balancing	Villanueva Duo	11	0	11	3rd/4th
3	Sue and Arci	ArSue	Cheer Dancing	CCP Bobcats	12	3	15	1st
4	Kiray and Gab	GabRay	Dancing	The Splitters	11	0	11	3rd/4th

=== Week 5 (April 8 & 9) ===
Order	Contestants	AKA	Act	Guest Act	Points			Rank
Order	Contestants	AKA	Act	Guest Act	ICANdidates' Score	Audience's Score	Total	Rank
1	JC and Daniel	JCNiel	Stiletto Dance	Junior New System	17	0	17	1st
2	Kiray and Arci	ArciRay	Aerial Silk Dance	Louie Lorenzo	11	0	11	3rd
3	Pokwang and Cristine	PokTine	Flower Dance	Al Jane Ybanez	8	0	8	4th
4	Sue and Gab	SueGab	Foot Juggling	Enriqueta Reyes	12	3	15	2nd

=== Week 6 (April 16 & 22) ===
Order	Contestants	AKA	Act	Guest Act	Points			Rank
Order	Contestants	AKA	Act	Guest Act	Judge's Score _{Angel Locsin & Douglas Nierras}	Audience's Score	Total	Rank
1	Gab, Cristine, Daniel and Arci	Alab ng Puso	LED Poi Dancing	Alab Poi Dancers	2	1	3	2nd
2	Pokwang, JC, Sue and Kiray	Team Folktastic	Various Folk Dancing	Bughaw Folktastic Dance Troupe	6	3	9	1st

=== Week 7 (April 23 & 29) ===
Order	Contestants	AKA	Act	Guest Act	Points			Rank
Order	Contestants	AKA	Act	Guest Act	ICANdidates' Score	Audience's Score	Total	Rank
1	Cristine and Daniel	CrisNiel	Trapeze	Rachel Guttierez	16	3	19	1st
2	Sue and JC	JSue	Hula Hoop	Star Ore	9	0	9	3rd
3	Pokwang and Arci	PokCi	Flag Twirling	Parcen Guards	8	0	8	4th
4	Gab and Kiray	GabRay	Cube and Staff	Eugene Rubio	15	0	15	2nd

== Versus Rounds ==
In the Versus Rounds, the selection process of the acts is the same, but their chosen partner is their competitor. In a pair (or trio in some acts), only one iCANdidate received the highest points from the other contestants. The audience's score system remained the same.

=== Week 8 (April 30 & May 6) ===
Order	Contestants	Versus	Act	Guest Act	Points			Rank
Order	Contestants	Versus	Act	Guest Act	ICANdidates' Score	Audience's Score	Total	Rank
1	JC	Gab	Rhythmic Gymnastics	Sheryl Contillo	2	0	2	5th/6th/7th
1	Gab	JC	Rhythmic Gymnastics	Sheryl Contillo	3	0	3	2nd/3rd/4th
2	Arci	Wacky Kiray	Foot Puppet Act	Paa Peteer	2	0	2	5th/6th/7th
2	Wacky Kiray	Arci	Foot Puppet Act	Paa Peteer	3	0	3	2nd/3rd/4th
3	Cristine	Daniel and Sue	Chair Balancing Act	Enopia's Acrobat	3	0	3	2nd/3rd/4th
3	Daniel	Cristine and Sue	Chair Balancing Act	Enopia's Acrobat	2	0	2	5th/6th/7th
3	Sue	Cristine and Daniel	Chair Balancing Act	Enopia's Acrobat	3	3	6	1st

=== Week 9 (May 7 & 13) ===
Order	Contestants	Versus	Act	Guest Act	Points			Rank
Order	Contestants	Versus	Act	Guest Act	ICANdidates' Score	Audience's Score	Total	Rank
1	Arci	Daniel and Sue	Acapella	Pinopela	2	0	2	4th/5th/6th/7th
1	Daniel	Arci and Sue	Acapella	Pinopela	2	0	2	4th/5th/6th/7th
1	Sue	Arci and Daniel	Acapella	Pinopela	3	0	3	2nd/3rd
2	Cristine	Gab	Wushu	Wushu Discovery	2	0	2	4th/5th/6th/7th
2	Gab	Cristine	Wushu	Wushu Discovery	3	0	3	2nd/3rd
3	JC	Wacky Kiray	Strong Man	Nestor Sabio	3	3	6	1st
3	Wacky Kiray	JC	Strong Man	Nestor Sabio	2	0	2	4th/5th/6th/7th

=== Week 10 (May 14 & 20) ===
Order	Contestants	Versus	Act	Guest Act	Points			Rank
Order	Contestants	Versus	Act	Guest Act	ICANdidates' Score	Audience's Score	Total	Rank
1	Cristine	Wacky Kiray	Unicycle Act	Abe Velasco	2	0	2	4th/5th/6th/7th
1	Wacky Kiray	Cristine	Unicycle Act	Abe Velasco	3	0	3	2nd/3rd
2	Daniel	Arci	Leviwand Act	Ehrlich Ocampo	2	0	2	4th/5th/6th/7th
2	Arci	Daniel	Leviwand Act	Ehrlich Ocampo	3	3	6	1st
3	Gab	JC and Sue	Tap Dance	Happy Feet	2	0	2	4th/5th/6th/7th
3	JC	Gab and Sue	Tap Dance	Happy Feet	3	0	3	2nd/3rd
3	Sue	Gab and JC	Tap Dance	Happy Feet	2	0	2	4th/5th/6th/7th

== Solo Performances ==
In Solo Performances, the scoring system is the same as the Group Performances', but 4 points are awarded by the iCANdidates to their first place, 3 to second, 2 to third, and 1 to fourth.

=== Week 11 (May 21 & 27) ===
Order	Contestants	Act	Guest Act	Points			Rank
Order	Contestants	Act	Guest Act	ICANdidates' Score	Audience's Score	Total	Rank
1	Sue	Scaffold Dance	Nique Manza	5	0	5	5th
2	Cristine	Rolla Bola Routine	Lee Twins	8	0	8	4th
3	Wacky Kiray	Pole Balancing	Orvelle Enopia & Richard Conde	16	3	19	1st
4	Gab	Extreme Hiphop Dance	Urban Crew	12	0	12	2nd
5	Daniel	BMX Tricks	Renz Viaje & BMX Freestylers	9	0	9	3rd

== Finals ==
The show's finals, dubbed as The Battle for Greatness, took place on June 3 to 4. The judges were Boy Abunda and Judy Ann Santos.

The acts were selected on May 28.

The fourth placer received ₱100,000; third placer received ₱200,000; and the runner-up received ₱300,000. The winner received ₱1,000,000, and the title of "The Greatest Entertainer".

=== Week 12 (May 28, June 3 & 4) ===
Order	Contestants	Act	Guest Act	Total Percentage	Rank
1	Gab	Ring Man	Frankendal Fabroa	44.44%	4th
2	Cristine	Fire Poi Dancing	Amok	83.09%	2nd
3	Daniel	Aerial Pole	Perez Family	47.81%	3rd
4	Wacky Kiray	Wire Balancing	Vil Vano & Janet Villanueva	93.75%	1st

=== Non-competition Performances ===
- Sam Milby, KZ Tandingan & Ogie Alcasid - "We Will Rock You" & "Let Me Entertain You"
- BoybandPH - "Larger than Life"
- Alex Gonzaga & Robi Domingo (AKA RoLex) - "Comedy Act with Crazy Duo" ^{a}

Note
a. As suggested by the ABS-CBN management and Armoza Formats, the owner of the show's format, the two hosts also performed during the finals. The announcement was made by the finalists.
