= Wacky Kiray =

Filipino stand-up comedian, host, and actor (born 1980)

- Born: Ricardo Janaban Balarosa, Jr. June 24, 1980 (age 46); Pasay, Metro Manila, Philippines
- Occupations: Stand-up comedian, actor, host
- Years active: 1999–present

Ricardo Janaban Balarosa, Jr. (born June 24, 1980), known professionally as Wacky Kiray, is a Filipino stand-up comedian, host, and actor. He became known in the celebrity talent competition I Can Do That of ABS-CBN and was declared winner as "The Greatest Entertainer" in 2017. He also became one of the "sing-vestigators" of the Korean game show franchise I Can See Your Voice.

== Career ==
Wacky Kiray started his career in stand-up comedy when he was discovered by the bar manager of former Raymund's Bar in Malate, Manila while he was singing as a guest of the said sing-along bar in 2000. He is currently a mainstay and resident stand-up comedian in Punchline and Laffline comedy bars.

He started working for ABS-CBN as an audience jester for the second season of Your Face Sounds Familiar in September 2015 and followed by different programs like Gandang Gabi Vice, Pinoy Boyband Superstar, The Voice Kids, and the fifth season of Pilipinas Got Talent.

Wacky Kiray's biggest break was when he became part of the hit celebrity talent show I Can Do That in 2017. He was named the winner of the said competition and was hailed as "The Greatest Entertainer" on June 4, 2017.

== Filmography ==
=== Television ===
Year	Title	Role
2024	All-Out Sundays	Himself / Guest Performer / Player
2023–2024	TiktoClock	Himself / Guest host
2020–2021	Phoenix Super LPG Kaderoke	Himself / Host
2020	Sunday 'Kada	Himself / Various characters
2020–2023	Lunch Out Loud / Tropang LOL	Himself / Host
2018	Bagani	Dagat
2017–2020	I Can See Your Voice	Himself / Singvestigator
2017–2018	Home Sweetie Home	Joaquin Acosta
2017–2020	Banana Sundae	Supporting cast
2017	Funny Ka Pare Ko Season 4	Wacky Kiray
2017	I Can Do That	Himself / Player
2016–2020	Gandang Gabi Vice	Himself

=== Films ===
Year	Title	Role
2019	Familia Blondina	Recruiter
2019	Ang Sikreto ng Piso	
2018	The Hopeful Romantic	Monette
2018	Wander Bra	Black Bra
2017	Gandarrapiddo:The Revenger Squad	Pospora / Bul-dog
2017	The Barker	Daniel
2012	This Guy's in Love With U Mare	Stand-up comedian
2012	EDSA XXX	various

=== Guestings ===
- Chika, Besh! (2020)
- Banana Sundae (2017)
- Umagang Kay Ganda (2017)
- Minute To Win It (2016, 2017)
- Magandang Buhay (2017)
- Family Feud (2016, 2017)
- It’s Showtime (2015; Lip Swak daily winner, Lip Swak Olympics Grand Champion)
