= Tropang LOL =

Philippine television variety show

- Title card from July 16, 2022, to April 29, 2023
- Also known as: Lunch Out Loud
- Genre: Variety show Game show
- Created by: Albee Benitez
- Developed by: Brightlight Productions
- Written by: Robin Sison; Koko Joven; Dave Ili; Russel Peñafuerte
- Directed by: Bjoy Balagtas
- Creative directors: Bobet Vidanes; Johnny Manahan
- Presented by: See below
- Country of origin: Philippines
- Original languages: Tagalog; English (partial)

Production
- Executive producer: Rowena P. Valencia
- Producers: Albee Benitez; Bobet Vidanes; Johnny Manahan
- Production locations: Studio 72, #72 Kalayaan Ave., Diliman, Quezon City, Metro Manila, Philippines
- Camera setup: Multiple-camera setup
- Production company: Brightlight Productions

Original release
- Network: TV5
- Release: October 19, 2020 – April 29, 2023
- Network: Kapamilya Channel; A2Z
- Release: July 16, 2022 – April 29, 2023

Tropang LOL (formerly Lunch Out Loud) is a Philippine television variety show broadcast by TV5 and Kapamilya Channel. Originally hosted by Billy Crawford, Alex Gonzaga, Bayani Agbayani, K Brosas, Wacky Kiray, Ariel Rivera, KC Montero, Francoise "Laboching" Faisan, Mark Averilla (also known as Macoy Dubs) and Jeff Tam, it aired on Kapamilya Channel's Unli PrimeTanghali afternoon line up and TV5's Lunchtime Saya afternoon line up from October 19, 2020, to April 29, 2023, replacing Kapamilya Blockbusters on Kapamilya Channel and One PH simulcast of One Balita Pilipinas on TV5 and was replaced by Kapamilya Blockbusters on Kapamilya Channel and Face 2 Face on TV5.

== Overview ==
The show was first known as Lunch Out Loud which premiered on October 19, 2020, as a regular daily noontime variety show as part of TV5's blocktime deal with Brightlight Productions. The encore episodes were subsequently aired on Cignal TV's cable channel Colours TV until the said cable channel closed down on January 1, 2022. The original hosts include Billy Crawford, Alex Gonzaga, Bayani Agbayani, K Brosas, Wacky Kiray, Ariel Rivera, KC Montero, Francoise "Laboching" Faisan, Mark Averilla (also known as Macoy Dubs) and Jeff Tam. The show marks the return of Gonzaga and Agbayani to TV5.

On July 16, 2022, Lunch Out Loud was reformatted with a new title Tropang LOL and began its simulcast over Kapamilya Channel, Kapamilya Online Live, and A2Z. It was moved to an earlier timeslot at 11:00 AM as a pre-programming to It's Showtime and part of their back-to-back collaboration. The show is also available in IWantTFC and TFC.

Tropang LOL officially aired its final episode on April 29, 2023, after almost three years and Face 2 Face replaced its vacated timeslot on TV5 on May 1, along with It's Showtime returned to its original 12:00 nn timeslot until June 30 when the network's blocktime agreement expired. The next day, It's Showtime moved its simulcast to GMA Network-owned GTV before it expanded into GMA Network's main channel and AMBS-owned ALLTV nearly a years later, whereas TV5's new noontime show, E.A.T. (later becoming Eat Bulaga! on January 6, 2024) premiered at the same time.

== Hosts ==
- Billy Crawford (2020–2023)
- Alex Gonzaga (2020–2023)
- Bayani Agbayani (2020–2023)
- Wacky Kiray (2020–2023)
- KC Montero (2020–2023)
- K Brosas (2020–2022)
- Mark Averilla (also known as Macoy Dubs / Auntie Julie) (2020–2021)
- Jeffrey Tam (2020–2023)
- Francoise Denyse Fainsan a.k.a. "Laboching" (2020–2023)
- Ariel Rivera (2020–2021)
- Querubin Gonzales (2021–2022)
- Nick Parker (2021–2022)
- Nikka Brillantes (2021–2022)
- JD Axie (2022–2023)
- Alexa Miro (2022–2023)
- Matteo Guidicelli (2022–2023)
- Nyca Bernardo (2023)

=== Other cast members ===
- DJ Arra Pascual (2020–2021)
- LOL Babes (2020–2023)
- LOL Boys (2020–2023)
- Jacob Plaza (Kantrabaho Winner) (2020–2023)
- Grace Cristobal (also known as "Amazing Grace") (2022; "Sagot Mo Sagot Ko" segment host)
- Mark Michael Garcia (as a Hope Singer) (2022–2021)

=== Guest co-hosts ===
- Gelli de Belen (2020–2021)
- Valerie Concepcion (2020–2021)
- Isabelle Daza (2020–2022)
- Kim Molina (2021)
- Claudine Barretto (2021)

== Accolades ==
Year	Award-Giving Body	Category	Nominated artist/work	Result	Ref.
2020	GEMS Hiyas ng Sining Awards	Best Variety Show	Lunch Out Loud	Won	
2020	GEMS Hiyas ng Sining Awards	Best Male Variety Show Host	Billy Crawford	Won	

== See also ==
- List of TV5 (Philippine TV network) original programming
- Kapatid Channel
- Philippine noontime variety television shows
