= Sunday 'Kada =

2020–21 Philippine television sketch comedy show

- Title card
- Genre: Sketch comedy, variety show
- Created by: Albee Benitez
- Developed by: Brightlight Productions
- Directed by: Edgar Mortiz; Frasco Mortiz; Badjie Mortiz
- Starring: Jayson Gainza; Ritz Azul; Wacky Kiray; and others
- Country of origin: Philippines
- Original language: Tagalog
- No. of episodes: 24

Production
- Executive producer: Ronna Mye Sanchez
- Producer: Albee Benitez
- Production locations: Studio 72, #72 Kalayaan Ave., Diliman, Quezon City, Metro Manila, Philippines
- Camera setup: Multiple-camera setup
- Running time: 60 minutes (with commercials)
- Production company: Brightlight Productions

Original release
- Network: TV5
- Release: October 18, 2020 – January 17, 2021

Related
- Banana Sundae; Goin' Bulilit; Tropa Mo Ko Unli

Sunday 'Kada (stylized as "sunday 'kada") is a Philippine sketch comedy variety show broadcast on TV5. Originally directed by Edgar Mortiz, Frasco Mortiz and Badjie Mortiz, it stars Jayson Gainza, Ritz Azul, Wacky Kiray, and many others. It aired from October 18, 2020 to January 17, 2021. On June 13, 2021, the pilot episode of the show became available on Brightlight Productions' programming affiliate ABS-CBN's iWantTFC and worldwide on TFC.

The program is produced by Brightlight Productions of former Rep. Albee Benitez as a blocktimer aired on TV5. The show is directed by renowned comedy director Edgar Mortiz.

After five months on air, Brightlight Productions announced on March 27, 2021 that this show will take a hiatus, and Sunday Noontime Live! will end on March 28, 2021 as producer claims that both shows does not earning profit as well as poor ratings and loss of advertisers' support.

On June 13, 2021, the pilot episode of the show became available on ABS-CBN's iWantTFC and worldwide on TFC.

== Cast ==
- Jayson Gainza
- Ritz Azul
- Joshua Colet
- Sunshine Garcia
- Wacky Kiray
- Daniel Matsunaga
- Maxine Medina
- Miles Ocampo
- Jerome Ponce
- Wally waley
- Badjie Mortiz
- Chienna Filomeno
- Maika Rivera

== See also ==
- Banana Sundae
- iWantTFC
- List of TV5 (Philippine TV network) original programming
- Kapatid Channel
