= Oh My Dad! =

2020–21 Philippine television comedy drama series

- Title card
- Genre: Comedy; Romance; Sitcom
- Created by: Joji Alonso
- Developed by: Brightlight Productions
- Written by: Ronald Allan "Alpha" Habon
- Directed by: Jeffrey R. Jeturian
- Starring: Ian Veneracion
- Opening theme: Oh My Dad! theme
- Ending theme: Oh My Dad! theme
- Country of origin: Philippines
- Original language: Tagalog
- No. of episodes: 26

Production
- Executive producer: Robert P. Galang
- Producers: Albee Benitez; Joji Alonso; Pat Sumagui
- Production location: Philippines
- Camera setup: Multiple-camera setup
- Running time: 60 minutes (with commercials)
- Production companies: Brightlight Productions; Quantum Films

Original release
- Network: TV5
- Release: October 24, 2020 – April 24, 2021

Oh My Dad! is a Philippie television situational comedy series broadcast by TV5. Directed by Jeffrey R. Jeturian, it stars Ian Veneracion in the title role. It aired on the network's TodoMax Weekend afternoon line up and worldwide on Kapatid Channel from October 24, 2020 to April 24, 2021. In June 2021, the show became available on Brightlight Productions programming affiliate ABS-CBN's streaming platform iWantTFC and worldwide on TFC. The show begin airing reruns on All TV from January 7 to July 8, 2023, and was replaced by the rerun of John en Ellen, it would be also airing reruns on RPTV begins sometime in 2026.

== Premise ==
Matthew Balderama (Ian Veneracion), a former PBA player/matinee idol tainted by scandal returns home to the Philippines after a long stint in the United States. To his surprise, his three "children" as a result of his wild love life come knocking at his doorstep, begging for him to take them in. Matthew makes an attempt at juggling sudden fatherhood with romance and fame, taking it one day at a time.

== Cast ==
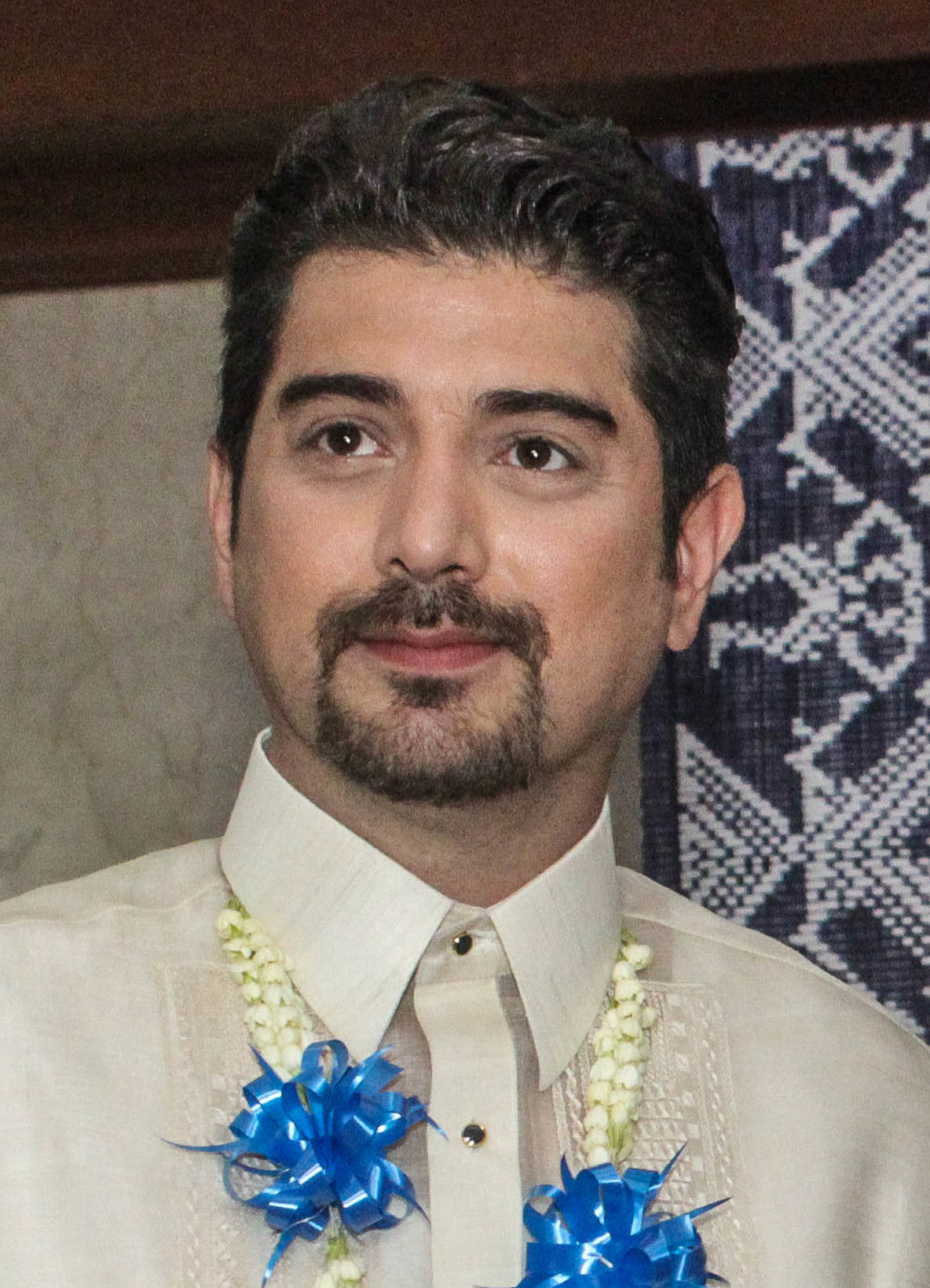
Ian Veneracion as Matthew Balderama

=== Main ===
- Ian Veneracion as Matthew "Matmat" Balderama, an athlete, celebrity, and novice father
- Dimples Romana as Cassandra "Sandra" Bergado-Balderama, Matthew's childhood friend and eventual love interest
- Sue Ramirez as Mhaddelyn Grace "Lenlen" Balderama, Matthew's middle child from Negros.
- Louise Abuel as Matthew "Theo" Balderama, Jr., the youngest Balderama sibling who is geeky yet caring.
- Adrian Lindayag as Mikhail "Kelly" Macapangyarihan-Balderama, the eldest of the siblings.
- Gloria Diaz as Belinda "Tiyang Bella" Bergado, the gossiping neighbor, aunt to Sandra and Jepoy.
- Ariel Ureta as Lolo Moises Balderama, Matthew's father and grandfather to his three newly-found children.

=== Supporting ===
- Gerry Acao as Benjomin "Benjo" Manalastas, Matthew's best friend and former teammate.
- Fino Herrera as Jefferson "Jepoy" Bergado, Tiyang Bella's nephew and helper, and the object of Kelly and Lenlen's affection
- Viveika Ravanes as Cassie, one of the Matthew's neighbors.

== See also ==
- List of TV5 (Philippine TV network) original programming
- Kapatid Channel
- RPTV (TV channel)
- The Filipino Channel
