= Edgar Mortiz =

Filipino actor and director (born 1954)

Edgar “Bobot” Mortiz
- Born: Edgardo Mortiz; August 30, 1954 (age 71); Quezon City, Metro Manila, Philippines
- Other name: Bobot
- Occupations: Actor, comedian, singer, film director, television director
- Years active: 1969–present
- Spouse: Milette Santos-Mortiz (m. 1977)
- Children: 4 (including Frasco Mortiz, & Badjie Mortiz)

Edgardo Mortiz (born August 30, 1954) is a Filipino actor, comedian, singer and director who is currently affiliated with ABS-CBN. He previously directed numerous shows under ABS-CBN, until its shutdown where he left the network after 34 years, until 2024 when he returned to ABS-CBN and directed Goin' Bulilit.

== Early and personal life ==
Mortiz married Millet Santos on April 3, 1977. They had 4 children - Ma. Frances Camille Mortiz, Ma. Carmela Catalin Mortiz, Frasco Mortiz and Badjie Mortiz. Santos was born in 1960, to Dr. Winifredo Santos and Nora Navarro-Santos, with children Charo Santos-Concio, Suzanne Santos, Malou N. Santos, Joey Santos and Mae Santos.

In March 2024, Mortiz released his new all-standards eight-track album - phonograph record "Goin' Standard".

== Filmography ==
=== As director ===
- Isa, Dalawa, Takbo (1996)
- Pera o Bayong (Not Da TV!) (2000)
- Young Love (1970)
- Drakulita (1969)

=== As writer ===
- Agent X44 (2007)

=== As producer ===
- Midnight Girls (2026)

=== As actor ===
==== Film ====
- Zoom, Zoom, Superman! (1973)
- My Juan En Only (1982) as Andres/ Andy
- Bad Bananas sa Puting Tabing (1983)
- The Untouchable Family (1988) as Mad Max
- Pare Ko (1995) as Noel Sto. Domingo
- Sampung Utos Kay Josh (2025) as Mr. Montes

==== Television ====
- Goin' Bananas (1986–1991)
- Lovingly Yours, Helen (1986–1996)
- Maalaala Mo Kaya (1991–2020)
- Rated PB: Pugad Baboy Sa TV (1992–1993)
- Que Horror (1996–1998; TV5)
- Tarajing Potpot (1998–2000)
- Maynila (1999)
- Arriba, Arriba! – Sodi Arriba (2000–2003)
- All Together Now (2003)
- Basta't Kasama Kita (2003–2004)
- Magpakailanman (2004)
- O Ha! (2005; TV5)
- Kampanerang Kuba – Father Agaton (Reprised Role) (2005)
- Talentadong Pinoy – guest judge (2008; TV5)
- Star Power – judge (2010)
- It's Showtime – judge in Tawag ng Tanghalan (2016)
- Dolce Amore – Ruben "Dodoy" Ibarra (2016)
- Sana Dalawa ang Puso (2018) – Ramon Bulalayao
- Dear Uge (2020)
- Happy Together (2021)
- It’s Okay to Not Be Okay (2025) – Dr. Anok Lumbera Sr.
- Blood vs Duty (2026) – Omar

=== Television credits ===
- Tropang Trumpo (1994–1998), Director
- Magandang Tanghali Bayan (1999–2003), Director
- Goin' Bulilit (2005–2019; 2024/Kapamilya Channel/A2Z/ALLTV), Director
- Mga Anghel na Walang Langit (2005), Creative Consultant
- Wowowee (2005–2010), Creative Director
- Let's Go (2006–2007), Director
- Banana Sundae (2008–2020), Director
- Pilipinas Win na Win (2010–2011), Creative Director
- Happy Yipee Yehey! (2011–2012), Creative Director
- Home Sweetie Home (2014–2020), Director
- Luv U (2012–2016), Director
- Sunday 'Kada (2020–2021), Director
- Wowowin (2020–2022), Creative Director
- Happy Together (2021–2023), creator and director

== Discography ==
=== Studio albums ===
- My Pledge of Love (1969, Wilear's Records)
- Simply the Best (1970, Wilear's Records)
- Alaala ang Pagbabalik (Vicor Music Corporation)
- People (Vicor Music Corporation)

=== Compilation album ===
- Edgar Mortiz (Vicor Music Corporation)

== Awards ==
Year	Award giving body	Category	Nominated work	Results
1970	Awit Awards	Best Single	"My Pledge of Love"	Won
1971	Awit Awards	Best Mini-Album	"Something Stupid" with Vilma Santos	Won
2026	The EDDYS	2026 Movie Icon Award		Won
