= Minute to Win It (Philippine game show) =

Philippine game show

- Genre: Game show
- Based on: Minute to Win It by: Mattias Olsson; Jock Millgårdh
- Written by: Waldo Martino Bautista; Noel Balmaceda; Bebeth Santos; Mark Joseph Buenafe; Angilette Ken C. Escobar; Benjamin Guerrero; Darwin M. Guevarra; Coco Nicanor
- Directed by: Johnny Manahan
- Presented by: Luis Manzano
- Country of origin: Philippines
- Original language: Filipino
- No. of episodes: 282 (season 1); 204 (Last Man Standing); 168 (Last Man Standing II)

Production
- Executive producers: Alou Almaden; Eugenio Lopez III (2013); Charo Santos-Concio (2013–16); Carlo L. Katigbak (2016–19); Cory V. Vidanes; Laurenti M. Dyogi; Luis L. Andrada
- Producers: Rose Casala; Cai Rodriguez-Dueñas; Frances Lee Mendoza
- Camera setup: Multi-camera
- Running time: 45 minutes (season 1; Last Man Standing II); 60 minutes (Last Man Standing I)
- Production companies: ABS-CBN Studios; Endemol Shine Group (2013–2019); Banijay Entertainment

Original release
- Network: ABS-CBN
- Release: January 14, 2013 – September 6, 2019
- Network: Kapamilya Channel

Minute to Win It is a Philippine television game show broadcast by ABS-CBN, Kapamilya Channel, A2Z, All TV and TV5. The based on the American game show of the same title. It is hosted by Luis Manzano. It aired on the network's PrimeTanghali line up from January 14, 2013 to February 21, 2014. The show aired Mondays to Fridays. Contestants take part in a series of 60-second challenges that use objects that are commonly available around the house. Those who complete ten challenges would win the top prize of the show, PHP ₱1,000,000. The first season of Last Man Standing aired on the network's Primetime Bida line up from July 18, 2016 to May 5, 2017. The second season of Last Man Standing aired from January 7 to September 6, 2019. The second regular season will premiere in 2026.

== Format ==
=== Original format ===
Minute to Win It follows the format of the original American game show wherein a contestant is presented with a blueprint for each level to complete within a 60-second time limit. After successfully completing the first, fifth, and eighth level games, the contestant is guaranteed to leave with no less than the cash award for those levels.

The difficulty of the blueprints progressively increases as a contestant advances to a higher level. If time runs out or the conditions of the game cannot be fulfilled (such as by the contestant exhausting any allotted attempts or committing a foul), the contestant loses a "life". If the contestant loses all three of their "lives", the game ends and the contestant's winnings drop to their guaranteed safe level.

After successfully completing a level, the contestant can leave with the amount of money already won before seeing the blueprint for the next game. However, once the contestant chooses to go to the next level, they must complete the level or exhaust all of their three lives.

The host of Minute to Win It

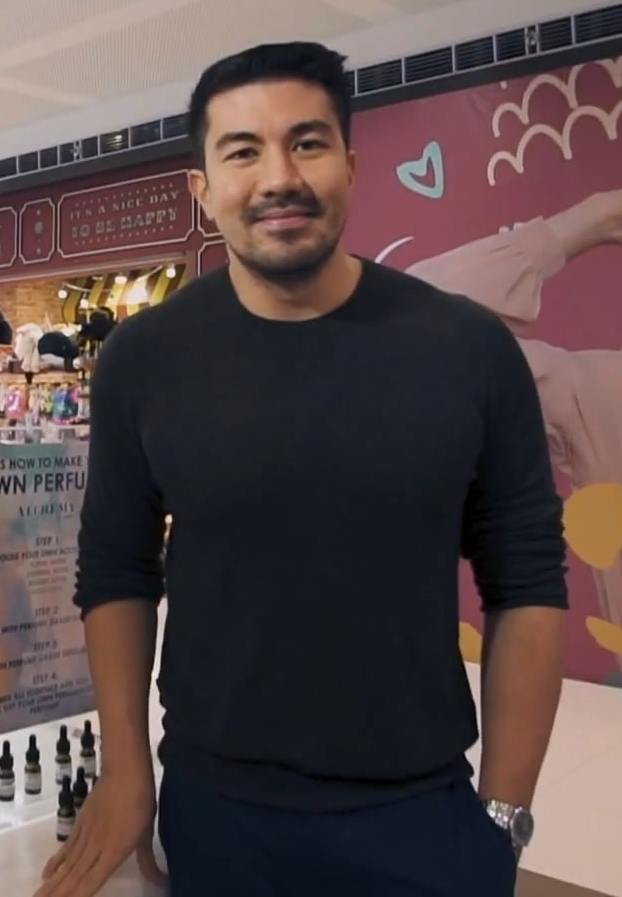
Luis Manzano

This format has been used in Teen Challenge, Ateneo vs La Salle, and other special episodes.

=== Timeslot change ===
On February 13, 2017, the show has moved into a new timeslot as part of the Kapamilya Gold's afternoon block and moved to 5:00 PM which has temporarily occupied by Pinoy Big Brother Lucky Season 7: Mga Kwentong Dream Team ni Kuya to give away from Wildflower into an earlier primetime timeslot.

=== Junior format ===
The format for the Junior episodes, which is a first for the Minute to Win It franchise, follows different mechanics: two teams of two members complete five levels together within the 60-second time limit to earn points. Aside from the point system, the team who finishes first wins a special prize. At the end of the game, the team with the most points wins ₱75,000 as well as a chance to play in the ultimate challenge with the top prize of ₱500,000.

=== Head-to-Head Challenge format ===
The format is similar with the Junior format with slight tweaks of its mechanics. Two teams with pre-existing relationships play head to head for a point in every challenge. The first team to get four points will automatically wins ₱75,000 and the chance to win the top prize of ₱1,000,000. If ever they failed to complete the jackpot challenge, the team can still play it again since they are given three attempts to win the grand prize.

The Head-to-Head Challenge is reformatted on Season 2, with the 2 Last Men Standing were given best-of-3 matches, the one who wins 2 points wins and goes to the 60-second circle.

=== Family and Team Challenge format ===
Two teams of four members complete five levels together within the 60-second time limit to earn prizes. At the end of the game, the team with more prizes plays in the ultimate challenge with the top prize of ₱1,000,000.

=== Last Man Standing format ===
Initially 6 contestants compete in 6 challenges. In each round, the last one to complete the task (or in Bobble Head, the one with the worst score) with no one-minute timer is eliminated. The last two players wins ₱20,000. The last man standing with the best of three showdown wins ₱50,000 and a chance to play for ₱1,000,000.

Later, 5 contestants compete in 5 challenges.

This format has been used in Last Teen Standing, Last Singer Standing, and other special episodes.

On Season 2, there are changes: 5 people were chosen, 1 Kapamilya Studio Contestant and 4 celebrities were chosen. No time limit on knockout matches. The winner on daily were reserved on Friday. The rest will fight their way again, another contestant added daily. And there is only 5 challenges with no time limit, then the last man standing match is applied to the winner, to take a shot at 1,000,000. Then the winner will have another chance to win 1,000,000, in total of ₱2,000,000.

=== Last Kid Standing format ===
8 children compete in 8 challenges. In each round, the last one to complete the task (or in Bobble Head, the one with the worst score) with no one-minute timer is eliminated. The last two children to remain will win ₱20,000. Two members complete two challenges together to earn two points. Aside from the point system, a player who finishes first wins a special prize. The Last Kid Standing with the best of three showdown wins ₱50,000 and a chance to play for ₱1,000,000.

=== Last Duo Standing format ===
5 duos compete in 7-8 challenges (including head-to-head and ultimate). In each round, the last duo who is able to complete the challenge with no one-minute timer is eliminated. The last two duos to remain will win ₱20,000. The winner of the best-of-3 series of challenges will win ₱50,000 and a chance to play for ₱1,000,000.

On Season 2, the title was changed to Last Tandem Standing, there are changes: 4 pairs were chosen, 1 Kapamilya Studio Pair and 3 pairs of celebrities were chosen. No time limit on knockout matches. The winner on daily were reserved on Friday. The rest will fight their way again, another contestant added daily. And there is only 5 challenges with no time limit, then the last tandem standing match is applied to the winner, to take a shot at 1,000,000. Then the winner will have another chance to win 1,000,000, in total of ₱2,000,000.

=== Last Kapamilya Standing format ===
3 contestants in a barangay will compete for the spot, and the other two will play in the second and third day. On Thursday, the 3 will compete for a spot in the Ultimate Last Man Standing.

=== Last Kapamilya Tandem format ===
3 pairs in a barangay will compete for the spot, and the other two will play in the second and third day. On Thursday, the 3 will compete for a spot in the Ultimate Last Tandem Standing.
