= Sunday Noontime Live! =

2020–21 Philippine television variety show

- Title card
- Also known as: SNL; Live at Five: Sunday Ultimate Party (original working title)
- Genre: Variety show
- Created by: Albee Benitez
- Developed by: Brightlight Productions; Cornerstone Studios
- Directed by: Johnny Manahan
- Presented by: Piolo Pascual; Maja Salvador; Catriona Gray; Ricci Rivero; Donny Pangilinan; Jake Ejercito and others
- Country of origin: Philippines
- Original languages: Filipino (primary); English (secondary)
- No. of seasons: 1
- No. of episodes: 14

Production
- Executive producers: Nancy Yabut; Corrs Ebora-Valenton; Harold Castillo
- Producer: Albee Benitez
- Production locations: Studio 72, #72 Kalayaan Ave., Diliman, Quezon City, Metro Manila, Philippines
- Camera setup: Multiple-camera setup
- Running time: 120 minutes (with commercials)
- Production companies: Brightlight Productions; Cignal Entertainment; Cornerstone (CS) Studios

Original release
- Network: TV5
- Release: October 18, 2020 – January 17, 2021

Related
- P.O.5

Sunday Noontime Live! was a Philippine television variety show broadcast by TV5. Hosted by Piolo Pascual, Maja Salvador, Catriona Gray, Donny Pangilinan, Ricci Rivero and Jake Ejercito, it aired from October 18, 2020 to January 17, 2021. Veteran television director and former Star Magic head Johnny Manahan takes the helm as director, following his longtime stint directing the longest-running Sunday variety show ASAP for over 25 years.

== History ==
Following the shutdown and franchise denial of ABS-CBN, it was reported on September 14, 2020 that Piolo Pascual, Catriona Gray and Lani Misalucha are set to host a musical variety show to be directed by Johnny Manahan with a working title of Live at Five: Ultimate Sunday Party, after Brightlight Productions signed a blocktime agreement with TV5.

On September 22, 2020, Maja Salvador revealed that she will be joining the show as one of the main hosts. Contrary to earlier reports, Misalucha was not included in the final cast of the show.

On October 1, 2020, it was revealed that Donny Pangilinan and Jake Ejercito joined the show to complete the main hosts of the program. Also, the show was later retitled to its final title of Sunday Noontime Live!

The show aired its first episode on October 18, 2020. It marked the comeback of having a Sunday musical variety show on TV5 after four years, however, unlike the previous shows, Sunday Noontime Live was not produced by TV5 themselves and aired only through a blocktime agreement between Brightlight Productions and TV5.

On November 15, 2020, the show's second live episode was unable to go live due to technical difficulties, Instead, a replay of the second episode (#SNLAllOverTheWorld) was aired instead. The supposed episode would later be aired on the following week as a pre-taped episode.

On January 3, 2021, Donny Pangilinan left the show to focus on Kapamilya projects, including He's Into Her. Ricci Rivero would later be promoted to main host to replace him.

However, after three months on air, it was revealed that Sunday Noontime Live! would air its final episode due to a lack of advertisers and sponsorships which resulted to a loss of their budget to pay the blocktime agreement with TV5, despite already having planned its rehearsals, tapings and live episode for its supposed second season. The show aired its last episode on January 17, 2021, being a replay of several past prods from the past few episodes. After the show ended, its vacated timeslot was filled by a simulcast of ASAP.

Eventually, following its end, some of the show's performers and hosts, namely, Donny Pangilinan, KD Estrada, Maris Racal, Sam Mangubat, Fana and Zephanie (later transferred to GMA Network in 2022) have returned to ASAP.

== Broadcast ==
The show aired every Sundays from 12:00 NN to 2:00 PM (PST)

As the show was held during the COVID-19 pandemic in the Philippines, the show never admitted a live studio audience, and implemented safety precautions for the cast and crew involved in the program during tapings/live stagings. Also, a lock-in taping was entailed to produce a month worth of episodes, with only the episode during the lock-in taping cycle being staged live from Studio 72 itself.

The show aired its final episode on January 17, 2021, being a replay of several prods from the past few episodes, together with Sunday 'Kada. A simulcast of ASAP filled its timeslot.

== Final hosts ==
Final hosts

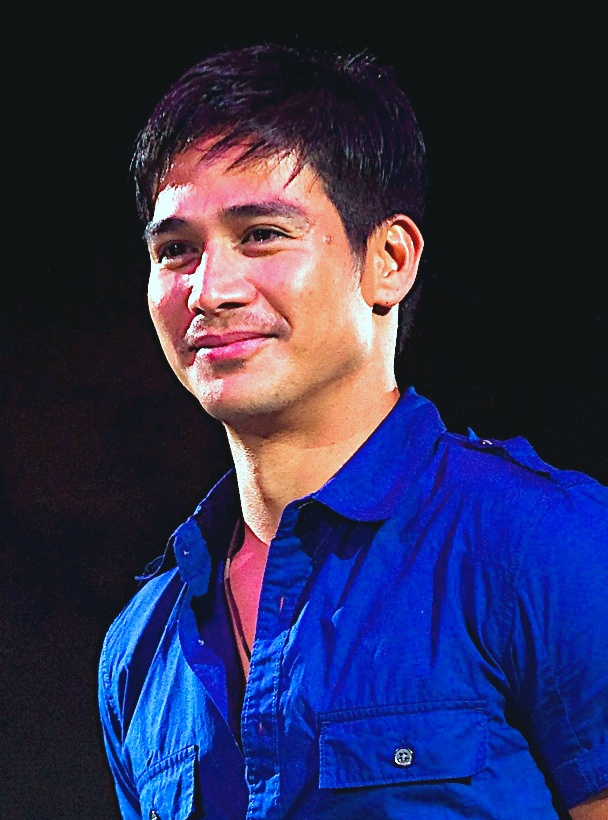
Piolo Pascual

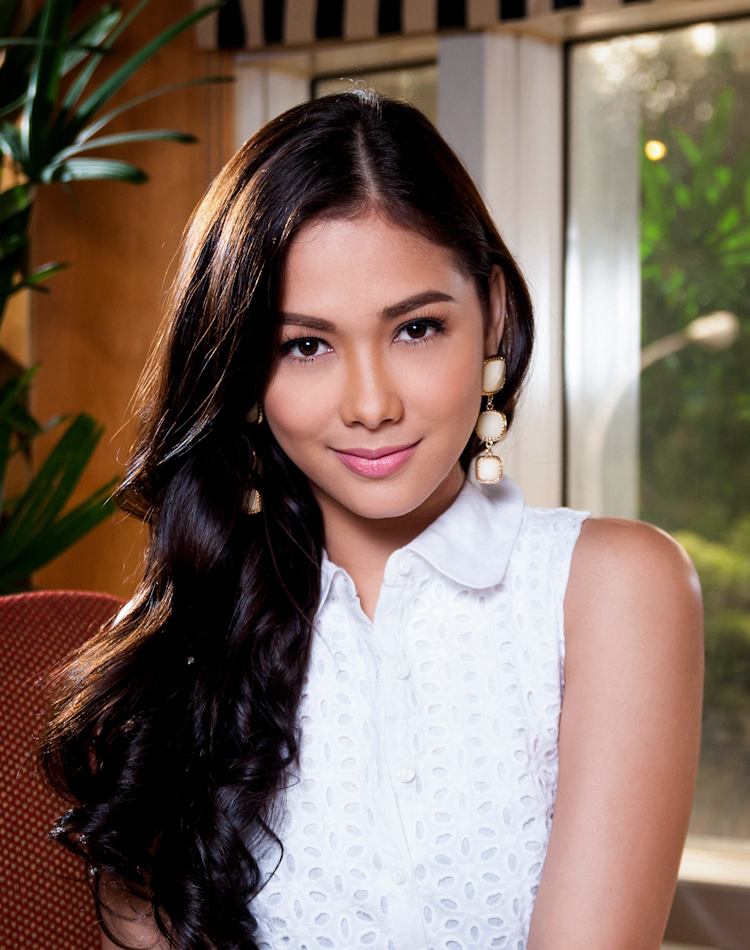
Maja Salvador

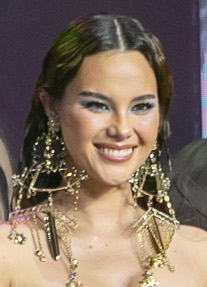
Catriona Gray

=== Main hosts ===
- Piolo Pascual (2020–21) (Note: Following the cancellation of the show, this artist returned to ASAP)
- Maja Salvador (2020–21)
- Catriona Gray (2020–21)
- Donny Pangilinan (2020–21)
- Jake Ejercito (2020–21)
- Ricci Rivero (2021)

=== Performers and occasional guests ===
- Beauty Gonzalez
- Bugoy Drilon
- Claire Ruiz
- Daryl Ong
- Dimples Romana
- Fana
- Jane Oineza
- Jerome Ponce
- Ken San Jose
- Katrina Velarde
- Kokoy de Santos
- Maris Racal
- Niel Murillo
- Ricci Rivero (elevated to main host) (Note: Rivero was elevated to main host after Donny Pangilinan left his SNL stint to do the series He's Into Her)
- RK Bagatsing
- Sam Mangubat
- Sassa Dagdag
- SB19
- The Juans
- This Band
- Zephanie Dimaranan (Note: This artist eventually transferred to GMA Network after the show concluded/had a stint in ASAP)
- Ashley Colet
- Charles Kieron
- Claudia Barretto
- Janina Vela
- KD Estrada
- Renee Dominique
- Trisha Denise
- Jayda Avanzado
- Jason Hernandez
- Riva Quenery
- Miguel Odron
- Kris Bernal
- Jay R

=== Sunday Noontime Live! Band ===
- Rey Cantong - Musical Director, Guitarist & Vocalist
- Cookie Taylo - Bass
- Tag-Chariz Duque Cantong - Drums
- Elijah Glenn De Vera - Keyboards
- Kaye Cantong - Vocalist

== Segments ==
=== Asian-Vasion ===
A segment where various artists perform certain songs that are K-Pop or are used as theme songs for Korean drama series in a dance prod or singing prod.

=== Ultimate Vocal Showdown ===
A group composed of Zephanie Dimaranan, Fatima Louise Lagueras a.k.a. Fana, Sassa Dagdag, Sam Mangubat and Niel Murillo of BoybandPH, this segment showcases the 5 aforementioned singers singing the hits of one specific artist.

=== KantaOke ===
A segment where the hosts sing a single OPM song, this segment is always the last segment for each episode.

=== YouHoo ===
A segment where various artists perform a dance production number.

=== Jampak ===
A segment where various Sunday Noontime Live! artists perform the songs of a specific OPM artist/band.

== Ratings ==
According to AGB Nielsen Philippines' Nationwide Urban Television Audience Measurement People in Television Homes, the pilot episode of Sunday Noontime Live! earned a 1.2% rating.
