= Kimmy Dora (film series) =

Filipino comedy film series

- Directed by: Joyce Bernal (1 - 2); Chris Martinez (3)
- Written by: Chris Martinez
- Produced by: Piolo Pascual; Joyce Bernal (1 - 2); Eugene Domingo (3); Erickson Raymundo; Suzanne Shayne Sarte; Charo Santos-Concio (2); Malou Santos (2)
- Starring: Eugene Domingo; Ariel Ureta; Moi Bien; Miriam Quiambao; Mura; Dingdong Dantes; Zanjoe Marudo; Sam Milby (3)
- Cinematography: Shayne Sarte
- Edited by: Theressa de Leon (1); Joyce Bernal (2 - 3); Marya Ignacio (2 - 3)
- Music by: Brian Cua (1); Vincent De Jesus (2 - 3)
- Production companies: Spring Films; MJM Productions; Star Cinema (2); Quantum Films (3)
- Distributed by: Solar Films (1); Star Cinema (1 - 2); Spring Films (3)
- Release dates: September 2, 2009 (1); June 13, 2012 (2); December 25, 2013 (3)
- Running time: 311 minutes
- Country: Philippines
- Languages: Filipino, English, Korean
- Box office: ₱421,063,009.00 (estimated only)

Kimmy Dora (Korean: 키미 도라; RR: Kimi Dora) is a Filipino comedy film series originally produced by Spring Films, co-produced and distributed by Star Cinema and Solar Films. The film stars mainly Eugene Domingo, Ariel Ureta, Moi Bien, Miriam Quiambao, and Mura. The leading actors of Eugene Domingo is Dingdong Dantes and Zanjoe Marudo for the first two films and Sam Milby for the final installment of the film. The series has grossed over ₱200 million worldwide (not including the last film). The first film installment, Kimmy Dora: Kambal sa Kiyeme, was released on September 2, 2009. The second installment, Kimmy Dora and the Temple of Kiyeme, was released on June 13, 2012. The final installment and the highest-grossing film in the series, Kimmy Dora: Ang Kiyemeng Prequel, was released on December 25, 2013, as an official entry to the 2013 Metro Manila Film Festival, becoming the 4th placer in the annual festival that estimatedly gross over ₱209 million.
