= PMPC Star Award for Best Child Performer =

The PMPC Star Award for Best Child Performer is an award presented annually at the PMPC Star Awards for Television by the Philippine Movie Press Club. The "Best Child Performer" award was first introduced in the 26th PMPC Star Award for Television.

== Winners and nominees ==
The award was not presented for the 35th edition in 2023. The 36th PMPC Star Award for Television was not held, while the 37th edition comprised television programming that ran from 2022-2023, with the ceremony being held in 2025.

In the list below, the winner of the award for each year is shown first, followed by the other nominees.

Table key
‡	Indicates the winner

=== 2010s ===
Year	Actor	Film	Network
2012 (26th)
2012 (26th)	Xyriel Manabat‡	100 Days to Heaven	ABS-CBN 2
2012 (26th)	Bugoy Cariño	E-Boy	ABS-CBN 2
2012 (26th)	Jillian Ward	Luna Blanca	GMA 7
2012 (26th)	Louise Abuel	100 Days to Heaven	ABS-CBN 2
2012 (26th)	Mona Louise Rey	Munting Heredera	GMA 7
2012 (26th)	Yogo Singh	Walang Hanggan	ABS-CBN 2
2012 (26th)	Zaijian Jaranilla	Ikaw ang Pag-ibig	ABS-CBN 2
2013 (27th)
2013 (27th)	Andrea Brillantes‡	Annaliza	ABS-CBN 2
2013 (27th)	Izzy Canillo	My Little Juan	ABS-CBN 2
2013 (27th)	JB Agustin	Little Champ	ABS-CBN 2
2013 (27th)	Jillian Ward	Home Sweet Home	GMA 7
2013 (27th)	Louise Abuel	Juan dela Cruz	ABS-CBN 2
2013 (27th)	Xyriel Manabat	Kailangan Ko'y Ikaw	ABS-CBN 2
2013 (27th)	Zaijan Jaranilla	Lorenzo's Time	ABS-CBN 2
2014 (28th)
2014 (28th)	Raikko Mateo ‡	Honesto	ABS-CBN 2
2014 (28th)	Andrea Brillantes	Annaliza	ABS-CBN 2
2014 (28th)	David Remo	Binoy Henyo	GMA 7
2014 (28th)	Jillian Ward	My BFF	GMA 7
2014 (28th)	Marc Justin Alvarez	Ang Dalawang Mrs. Real	GMA 7
2014 (28th)	Mona Louise Rey	My BFF	GMA 7
2014 (28th)	Yogo Singh	Maria Mercedes	ABS CBN 2
2015 (29th)
2015 (29th)	Harvey Bautista (tied) ‡	Wansapanataym: Remote ni Eric	ABS-CBN
2015 (29th)	Marco Masa (tied) ‡	Nathaniel	ABS-CBN
2015 (29th)	Alonzo Muhlach	Inday Bote	ABS-CBN
2015 (29th)	Ashley Sarmiento	Flordeliza	ABS-CBN
2015 (29th)	Chlaui Malayao	Yagit	GMA 7
2015 (29th)	Jana Agoncillo	Dream Dad	ABS-CBN
2015 (29th)	Xyriel Manabat	Hawak Kamay	ABS-CBN
2015 (29th)	Zaijian Jaranilla	Hawak Kamay	ABS-CBN
2016 (30th)
2016 (30th)	McNeal "Awra" Briguela‡	FPJ's Ang Probinsyano	ABS-CBN
2016 (30th)	Alonzo Muhlach	Ang Panday	TV5
2016 (30th)	Jana Agoncillo	Ningning	ABS-CBN
2016 (30th)	John Steven de Guzman	Ningning	ABS-CBN
2016 (30th)	Marco Masa	My Super D	ABS-CBN
2016 (30th)	Miggs Cuaderno	Poor Senorita	GMA 7
2016 (30th)	Onyok Pineda	FPJ's Ang Probinsyano	ABS-CBN
2016 (30th)	Ryzza Mae Dizon	Princess in the Palace	GMA 7
2017 (31st)
2017 (31st)	Nayomi Ramos‡	My Dear Heart	ABS-CBN 2
2017 (31st)	Angelica Ulip	Ika-6 na Utos	GMA 7
2017 (31st)	Awra Briguela	Wansapanataym Presents: Amazing Ving	ABS-CBN 2
2017 (31st)	Enzo Pelojero	My Dear Heart	ABS-CBN 2
2017 (31st)	Justin James Quilantang	La Luna Sangre	ABS-CBN 2
2017 (31st)	Marc Justine Alvarez	Pinulot Ka Lang Sa Lupa	GMA 7
2017 (31st)	Xia Vigor	Langit Lupa	ABS-CBN 2
2017 (31st)	Yesha Camile	Langit Lupa	ABS-CBN 2
2017 (31st)	Yuan Francisco	Encantadia	GMA 7
2018 (32nd)
2018 (32nd)	Seth dela Cruz‡	Hindi Ko Kayang Iwan Ka	GMA 7
2018 (32nd)	Caprice Cayetano	Hindi Ko Kayang Iwan Ka	GMA 7
2018 (32nd)	Karlo Ezekiel Torres	The Blood Sisters	ABS-CBN 2
2018 (32nd)	Leanne Bautista	The Cure	GMA 7
2018 (32nd)	Nayomi "Heart" Ramos	FPJ's Ang Probinsyano	ABS-CBN 2
2018 (32nd)	Sofia Pablo	Sherlock Jr.	GMA 7
2018 (32nd)	Yñigo Delen	Since I Found You	ABS-CBN 2
2018 (32nd)	Zachie Rivera	The Stepdaughters	GMA 7
2019 (33rd)
2019 (33rd)	Sophia Reola‡	Nang Ngumiti ang Langit	ABS-CBN 2
2019 (33rd)	Euwenn Aleta	Cain at Abel	GMA 7
2019 (33rd)	Iyannah Sumalpong	Sino ang Maysala?: Mea Culpa	ABS-CBN 2
2019 (33rd)	JJ Quilantang	Playhouse	ABS-CBN 2
2019 (33rd)	Kenken Nuyad	FPJ's Ang Probinsyano	ABS-CBN 2
2019 (33rd)	Krystal Mejes	Nang Ngumiti ang Langit	ABS-CBN 2
2019 (33rd)	Miguel Vergara	Nang Ngumiti ang Langit	ABS-CBN 2
2019 (33rd)	Nayomi Ramos	Nang Ngumiti ang Langit	ABS-CBN 2
2019 (33rd)	Raphael Landicho	Bihag	GMA 7

=== 2020s ===
Year	Actor	Film	Network
2020 (34th)
2020 (34th)	Enzo Pelojero‡	Starla	ABS-CBN 2
2020 (34th)	Charles Jacob Briz	The Gift	GMA 7
2020 (34th)	Euwenn Aleta	Hanggang sa Dulo ng Buhay Ko	GMA 7
2020 (34th)	Jana Agoncillo	Starla	ABS-CBN 2
2020 (34th)	Kenken Nuyad	Parasite Island	ABS-CBN 2
2020 (34th)	Raikko Mateo	Pamilya Ko	ABS-CBN 2
2020 (34th)	Yuan Francisco	The Better Woman	GMA 7
2025 (37th)
2025 (37th)	Euwenn Mikaell‡	The Write One	GMA 7
2025 (37th)	Althea Ruedas	Dirty Linen	A2Z 11/TV5
2025 (37th)	Brianna Advincula	Tadhana: Bayad-Utang	GMA 7
2025 (37th)	Chastity Dizon	Can't Buy Me Love	A2Z 11/TV5
2025 (37th)	Grant Sommereux	One For All, All For One	INC TV 48
2025 (37th)	JJ Quilantang	Dirty Linen	A2Z 11/TV5
2025 (37th)	Kian Co	The Write One	GMA 7
2025 (38th)
2025 (38th)	Zion Cruz‡	Ang Himala ni Niño	TV5
2025 (38th)	Argus Aspiras	High Street	A2Z 11/TV5
2025 (38th)	Brianna Advincula	Pulang Araw	GMA 7
2025 (38th)	Cassy Lavarias	Pulang Araw	GMA 7
2025 (38th)	Jeremiah Cruz	Can't Buy Me Love	A2Z 11/TV5
2025 (38th)	Natalia Espejo	Lavender Fields	A2Z 11/TV5
2025 (38th)	Raphael Landicho	My Guardian Alien	GMA 7
2025 (38th)	TG Daylusan	Pulang Araw	GMA 7

Notes:

- Raikko Mateo is the first male winner of this award for Honesto in 2014.
- Seth dela Cruz is the first talent from GMA 7 to win this award for Hindi Ko Kayang Iwan Ka in 2018.
- Zion Cruz is the first talent from TV5 to win this award for Ang Himala ni Niño in 2024.
