= Kimmy Dora and the Temple of Kiyeme =

2012 film by Joyce Bernal

- Theatrical release poster
- Directed by: Bb. Joyce Bernal
- Written by: Chris Martinez
- Produced by: Erickson Raymundo
- Starring: Eugene Domingo
- Cinematography: Shayne Sarte
- Edited by: Joyce Bernal; Marya Ignacio
- Music by: Vincent De Jesus
- Production companies: Spring Films; Star Cinema
- Distributed by: Star Cinema
- Release date: June 13, 2012
- Running time: 105 minutes
- Countries: Philippines; South Korea
- Languages: Filipino; Korean
- Box office: ₱133.4 million

Kimmy Dora and the Temple of Kiyeme (Korean: 키미도라: 키예메의사원; Hanja: 키미도라: 키예메의寺院; RR: Kimi Dora: Kiyeme-ui Sawon; MR: K'imi Tora: K'i-yeme-ŭi Sawŏn) is a 2012 horror comedy film co-produced and directed by Joyce Bernal from a screenplay by Chris Martinez. It is the second installment in the Kimmy Dora film series, serving as a sequel to the 2009 film Kimmy Dora: Kambal sa Kiyeme. It tells the story of twin sisters Kimmy and Dora, both played by Eugene Domingo in their quest to find love in South Korea, only for them being stalked by a ghostly figure. The film premiered nationwide in the Philippines on June 13, 2012, and became the second highest grossing Filipino film of 2012, earning ₱100 million in two weeks, and currently holds the fifteenth place in the highest-grossing Filipino films of all time.

== Plot ==
At a gala event for the GoDongHae conglomerate's new airline, Kimmy, daughter of company chairman Luisito, is shocked to find that her outfit comically matches the decorations put up by her younger twin Dora, and fires the staff in an outrage. Soon after, Luisito receives a package, and he and his daughters vacation to Korea. On the plane, paranormal events begin to occur, which can only be seen by Dora and heard by Kimmy.

In Korea, Luisito also begins to experience supernatural visions. He then tells his daughters that one of them must marry the grandson of the Sang family, Daniel, as the Sangs had helped Luisito's family with their business in the past. Neither twin is willing to marry Daniel as both have boyfriends, however Daniel takes a liking to Dora.

Back home, Kimmy and Dora continue to experience supernatural occurrences. Kimmy is haunted by mysterious drum-beats and eventually faints. After recovering at the hospital, Kimmy is visited by her boyfriend Barry who proposes. Barry is later attacked by a ghost in the elevator and is found alive but paralyzed in a state of shock. On a date, Dora's boyfriend, Johnson, proposes to her but is soon attacked by the ghost as well.

Luisito explains that the ghost is that of his ex-fiancée from the Sang family, Sang Kang-kang, to whom he was betrothed as a young man. However, while studying in the Philippines, he met and was (forcibly) married to the twins’ mother, Charito. Upon finding out, Sang Kang-kang locked herself in her room, continually beating a drum until she wasted away and died. Now her vengeful spirit has returned and can only be heard by Kimmy and seen by Dora.

That night, when Luisito refuses to have his daughters marry Daniel and amend his ties with the Sangs, Sang Kang-kang attacks him, leaving him in the same state of shock. Luisito is hospitalized along with Johnson and Barry. Soon after, Kimmy and Dora find the package received by their father, revealed to be Sang Kang-kang's old photo album. Looking inside they find their father and boyfriends imprisoned with Sang Kang-kang who claims they are hers.

Lolo, a child shaman, visits the twins and they, along with Manny, a young friend of Barry's, Gertrude, Kimmy's secretary, and Elena, the family maid, attempt a ritual to confront Sang Kang-kang but are overwhelmed by the ghost.

With the only option left being marrying Daniel, Kimmy chooses to do so to spare her sister. However, Lolo interrupts the ceremony so they can attempt another ritual. Kimmy, Dora, and the others visit Sang Kang-kang's grave where they are soon attacked. The armor-clad spirit of Charito arrives and battles Sang Kang-kang.

Charito is eventually overpowered whereupon she apologizes for Sang Kang-kang's heartbreak. At the same time, Kimmy, Dora, and the others complete the ritual and manage to seal Sang Kang-kang inside the photo album, freeing their father and boyfriends in the process. Charito embraces her daughters and tells them to take care of one another before returning to the afterlife.

Soon after, Kimmy and Barry, and Dora and Johnson celebrate their wedding.

== Cast ==
=== Main cast ===
- Eugene Domingo as Kimmy/Dora/Charito Go Dong Hae (Korean: 고동해 키미/도라/차리토; RR: Go Dong-hae Kimi/Dora/Charito; MR: Ko Tong-hae K'imi/Tora/Ch'ari-t'o)
  - Kiray Celis as Young Charito GoDongHae (Korean: 고동해 차리토; RR: Go Dong-hae Charito; MR: Ko T'ong-hae Ch'ari-t'o)
- Dingdong Dantes as Johnson
- Zanjoe Marudo as Barry

=== Supporting cast ===
- Ariel Ureta as Luisito Go Dong Hae (Korean: 고동해 루이시토; RR: Go Dong-hae Ru-isito; MR: Ko Tong-hae Ru-isi-t'o)
  - Ryan Bang as Young Luisito GoDongHae (Korean: 고동해; RR: Go Dong-hae; MR: Ko T'ong-hae)
- Miriam Quiambao as Gertrude, Kimmy's secretary
- Moi Bien as Elena
- Allan "Mura" Padua as Lolo / Herbal Doctor
- Philip Nolasco as Manny
- Alodia Gosiengfiao as Sangkangkang (Korean: 상강강; RR: Sang Gang-gang; MR: Sang Kang-gang)
- Geraldine "Ge" Malacaman-Villamil as a double for Kimmy/Dora
- Mikky - Dora's pet dog
- Doo Chul-bang as young Luisito's dad
- Lee Jin-joo as Sangkangkang's mom
- Yoon Jong-yoon as Sangkangkang's dad
- Kim Keun Han as Grandpa Sang

=== Guest appearances ===
Here are some celebrities who made cameo appearances in the film:

- Jun Lalin as Daniel Sang
- Alexander Cortez as doctor Alex Cortez
- Mikey Reyes as doctor Michael Reyes
- Kat Lo as doctor Kathryn Lo
- Juan Sarte III as himself
- Jing Monis as himself
- Paul Cabral as himself
- Ginger Conejero as herself (reporter)
- Crystalle Belo Henares as herself
- Jason Sabio as himself
- Louis Claparols as himself
- Sen. Jinggoy Estrada as himself
- Haydee Ng as herself
- Kris Aquino as herself (party guest)
- Edgar Mangahas as himself
- Liz Uy as herself (party guest)
- Raymond Gutierrez as himself (party guest)
- Raymund Isaac as himself
- GB Sampedro as event director
- RJ Bernal as guest with Luisito
- Victor Chua as guest with Luisito
- Angel Aquino as herself
- Marlon Rivera as himself
- Slater Young as waiter with martini glass
- PBB Unlimited Ex-Housemates
- Maricar Reyes as flight attendant
- Richard Poon as flight attendant
- Jane Sy-Tan as flight attendant
- Yeng Constantino as passenger
- Markki Stroem as passenger
- Franco Laurel as nurse with British accent
- Ogie Diaz as Judge/Charito's uncle
- Marvin Agustin as Dr. Jose Rizal
- Martha Comia as nurse with Dr. Jose Rizal
- John Lapus as reception host
- Jayson Gainza as Barry's friend/bestman
- Kean Cipriano as groomsman
- Carlo Gonzales as Johnson's bestman
- Erik Santos as waiter
- Piolo Pascual

== Production ==
=== Background and development ===
In January 2012, the film producer and actor Piolo Pascual reported that he is working on producing more films this year under his own production outfit, Spring Films, and stated that the sequel of Kimmy Dora is shooting already. Also, on the January 4 episode of Kris TV where the lead star Eugene Domingo and director-producer Joyce Bernal revealed that they are already looking for a location in South Korea for the set of The Temple of Kiyeme. The script of the film was submitted as an official entry for the 2011 Metro Manila Film Festival but did not make it to the official list.

On January 25, the Korean National Tourism Organization reported that they have enticed the Philippine film Kimmy Dora and the Temple of Kiyeme to film in Korea. Filming took place at major landmarks of Seoul, such as Gwanghwamun Plaza, Cheonggyecheon, Myeongdong, Namsan Tower, and Doseonsa from January 29 until February 8. The Koreans fawned over the Filipino celebrities during the taping, while the film director Joyce Bernal was interviewed by the Korean Broadcasting System or KBS. Bernal noted in the interview, "The scenery is interesting. There is the traditional and there’s the modern. There is like two worlds in Seoul...".

In a separate interview, Bernal and lead cast, Eugene Domingo, expressed their satisfaction over the outcome of the Korean sojourn, and emphasized how the winter season afforded them to shoot several scenes in a blanket of snow. The scenes set in Seoul will take up around 40% of the film. On February 6, 2012, cast members Eugene Domingo, Alodia Gosiengfiao, and director Joyce Bernal posted a picture together with Super Junior member Kim Hee-chul. Alodia, a new addition to the cast, played a Korean lady. The film was supposed to air in April but was moved back to June to give way for Every Breath U Take and Born to Love You.

Under director Bernal, Irene Emma Villamor served as assistant director while Antoinette Jadaone served as script continuity supervisor.

== Critical reception ==
Professional ratings
Review scores
Source	Rating
Click The City	1.5/5 stars

Most of the reviews for the film were generally mixed to negative. Mark Angelo Ching of Philippine Entertainment Portal (PEP) stated, "...what's remarkable about Kimmy Dora 2 is that even though it features a hybrid of two movie genres, each half of these genres are done so well. The humor parts are truly hilarious, and the horror parts will creep you out...". He also added, "...the best component of Kimmy Dora 2 is still the performance of its actors." However, he also stated, "the first installment is still the better one[...]what does not quite work are the parts in between, when there are efforts to mix the two genres together. These parts somehow feel dull." Ria Limjap of SPOT Philippines stated that the sequel is a fun ride. She also stated, "...Eugene Domingo is very consistent in everything she does[...]KD uses some of the old tricks (celebrity cameos and hilarious costumes) along with new ones that come with a larger budget like clever special effects and shooting in foreign locations." Gelo Gonzales of FHM Philippines also reviewed the film stating, "Kimmy Dora 2 attempts some genre-bending of its own. It attempts to bring a new flavor to the table with its horror elements. That Sang Kang Kang is freaky. Freaky scary. Mad props to the prosthetics and special effects team for the wild Sadako-ish impersonation...". He also added that Eugene Domingo is a comedic gem as she plays both roles with conviction. However, she is not quite impress on how the two genres are mixed stating, "... slightly jarring, and by the end, you find yourself fatigued from the constant tone shift."

Oggs Cruz of Twitch Film expressed extreme disappointment to the film. He stated, "Joyce Bernal's Kimmy Dora and the Temple of Kiyeme misses the entire point. It is just one humongous mistake that sadly betrays whatever hope the success of Kimmy Dora: Kambal sa Kiyeme (2009) created for the Philippine film industry." He also stated that the film peddled nothing more but nonsense and described the film as plain treachery. Philbert Ortiz Dy of Click The City gave the film 1.5 out of 5 stars. He stated, "[film] is bafflingly bad, the charms of the first movie all sapped away as it makes a even bigger bid for the mainstream[...] But as the film does the horror, it forgets about its comedic core. None of this stuff is remotely funny, and the film losing all of its comedic momentum whenever the plot gives its attention to all this overly familiar genre nonsense." He also stated that the film looks sloppily done, and the horror feel is a waste of time.

=== Box office ===
The film is a box-office hit starting on the first day. Reports say that the sequel earned 10 Million pesos on its first day, tripling the gross of the Part 1 on the same duration. According to Box Office Mojo, the film grossed a total of 96 Million in two weeks, being the 2nd highest-grossing Filipino film of 2012. In its 6th week, the film grosses a total of PHP 133,479,766 and currently holds the 13th place in the highest-grossing Filipino film of all time

== Prequel ==
The cast and the director of the film revealed that the third installment is already on the works.

By late 2013, It was confirmed that there will be a prequel for the first two movies of Kimmy Dora: Kambal sa Kiyeme series entitled Kimmy Dora: Ang Kiyemeng Prequel which will be officially included in 2013 Metro Manila Film Festival.

== See also ==
- List of ghost films
