= Ashley Sarmiento =

Filipino actress (born 2007)

- Born: Arwen Ashley Altoveros Sarmiento; January 13, 2007 (age 19); Las Piñas, Metro Manila, Philippines
- Occupation: Actress
- Years active: 2013–present
- Agent(s): ABS-CBN Corporation (2013–2020); GMA Network (2020–present)
- Known for: Flordeliza

Arwen Ashley Altoveros Sarmiento (born January 13, 2007) is a Filipino actress. She gained prominence in the television series Dyesebel (2014), FlordeLiza (2015), and Goin' Bulilit (2016), all aired by ABS-CBN. She is currently an artist of GMA Network's management arm, Sparkle, and has appeared in Nakarehas na Puso (2022–2023), Black Rider (2023–2024) and Maka (2024–2025).

== Early life and education ==
Arwen Ashley Altoveros Sarmiento was born on January 13, 2007, in Las Piñas, Metro Manila. Sarmiento graduated from senior high school at the University of Perpetual Help System DALTA (UPHSD).

== Career ==
Sarmiento began her acting career at the age of five. She made her television debut as the young version of Anne Curtis' titular character in Dyesebel. She later played her first lead role as Flor in the ABS-CBN drama series FlordeLiza.

In 2020, Sarmiento signed a contract with GMA Network following ABS-CBN’s broadcast shutdown.

== Filmography ==
Key
| † | Denotes films that have not yet been released |

=== Films ===
| Year | Title | Role | Note(s) | Ref. |
|---|---|---|---|---|
| 2016 | The Escort | Joy | | |
| 2017 | Pwera Usog | Young Luna | | |
| 2019 | Mystified | Clara | | |
| 2019 | You Have Arrived | Young Arianne | | |
| 2023 | Ako si Ninoy | Blaire | | |
| 2025 | The Caretakers | Ali | | |

=== Television ===
| Year | Title | Role | Note(s) | Ref. |
|---|---|---|---|---|
| 2013–2019 | Goin' Bulilit | Herself/Various | | |
| 2014 | Dyesebel | young Dyesebel | | |
| 2015 | FlordeLiza | Flor M. Maristela | | |
| 2016 | Born for You | young Sam Reyes-Kazuko | | |
| 2016 | The Greatest Love | young Gloria Guerrero | | |
| 2019 | The General's Daughter | young Rhian | | |
| 2022–2023 | Nakarehas na Puso | Anica Marie "Nica" G. Divino | | |
| 2022 | Happy ToGetHer | Sandy | | |
| 2023 | Pepito Manaloto: Tuloy ang kuwento | Danica | | |
| 2023-present | TiktoClock | Herself/Guest | | |
| 2023-present | All-Out Sundays | Herself/Guest Performer | | |
| 2023–2024 | Black Rider | Nerissa "Neneng" Bartolome | | |
| 2024–2025 | Maka | Ash Salonga | | |
| 2024 | Sparkle TikTok Kilig Series | Ashley | | |
| 2025 | Akusada | Amber | | |
| 2025 | Maka Lovestream | Sofi | | |
| 2025–2026 | Pinoy Big Brother: Celebrity Collab Edition 2.0 | Housemate | Kapuso 3rd Big Placer | |
| TBA | The Way Back To You † | Chichi | Supporting role | |

=== Anthologies ===
| Year | Title | Role | Note(s) | Ref. |
|---|---|---|---|---|
| 2014 | Maalaala Mo Kaya | Young Marie | Episode: "Sulat" | |
| 2015 | Wansapanataym | Lara | Episode: "Lara Burara" | |
| 2016 | Maalaala Mo Kaya | Young Barbie | Episode: "Riles" | |
| 2016 | Maalaala Mo Kaya | Young Rina | Episode: "Medical Result" | |
| 2017 | Wansapanataym | Young Goldie | Episode: "My Hair Lady" | |
| 2017 | Maalaala Mo Kaya | Mae Ann | Episode: "Ice Candy | |
| 2018 | Wansapanataym | Bully | Episodes 377-378 | |
| 2018 | Maalaala Mo Kaya | Young Joy | Episode: "Rubber Shoes" | |
| 2018 | Maalaala Mo Kaya | Young Angelica | Episode: "Laptop" | |
| 2019 | Maalaala Mo Kaya | Young Ina, 2009 | Episode: "Jersey" | |
| 2019 | Maalaala Mo Kaya | Young Agnes | Episode: "Simbahan" | |
| 2019 | Maalaala Mo Kaya | Young Maria | Episode: "Lipstick" | |
| 2020 | Maalaala Mo Kaya | Young Kerstein | Episode: "Basketball Court" | |
| 2022 | Tadhana | Young Sheryl | Episodes 220-221 | |
| 2022 | Magpakailanman | Young Seannah | Episode: "My Race to Happiness: The Silamie Apolistar-Gutang Story" | |
| 2023 | Magpakailanman | Grace | Episode: "The Power of Love: The Miguel and Baby Duhaylungsod Story" | |
| 2023 | Magpakailanman | Vivian | Episode: "My Missing Daughter: The Antonio Cordeta Story" | |
| 2024 | Magpakailanman | Daisy's Friend | Episode: "Ang Banta ng Duwende" | |
| 2025 | Magpakailanman | Cherry | Episode: "Bata, Bata, Paano Ka Kinasal?" | |
| 2025 | Daig Kayo ng Lola Ko | Charlotte | Episodes 250-254 | |
| 2026 | Barangay Love Stories | Bianca | Episode: "Sabihin Mo Na" | |

== Awards and nominations ==
| Award | Year | Category | Nominated work | Result | Ref. |
|---|---|---|---|---|---|
| 7th Village Pipol Choice Award | 2026 | TV Supporting Actress of the Year | Akusada | Won | |
| Philippine Finest Business Awards and Outstanding Achievers | 2024 | Promising Love Team (Note: Shared with Marco Masa.) | —N/a | Won | |
| PMPC Star Awards for Television | 2015 | Best Child Performer | FlordeLiza | Nominated | |
| Urduja International Film Festival | 2019 | Best Young Performer | Viral Kids | Won | |
