= Tuhog =

2013 Filipino dark comedy film directed by Verónica Velasco

- Theatrical movie poster
- Directed by: Veronica B. Velasco
- Screenplay by: Veronica B. Velasco; Jinky Laurel
- Produced by: Charo Santos-Concio; Malou N. Santos; Enrico C. Santos
- Starring: Eugene Domingo; Enchong Dee; Jake Cuenca; Empress Schuck; Leo Martinez
- Cinematography: Kerwin Go
- Edited by: Beng Bandong
- Music by: Vincent A. de Jesus
- Production companies: ABS-CBN Film Productions; Skylight Films
- Distributed by: Star Cinema
- Release date: July 17, 2013
- Country: Philippines
- Language: Filipino
- Box office: ₱24,687,124.00

Tuhog (English: Impale) is a 2013 Filipino dark comedy-drama anthology film produced by Skylight Films. It stars Eugene Domingo, Leo Martinez, Enchong Dee, Empress Schuck, and Jake Cuenca.

Tuhog is one of the film entries sent for the 2012 Metro Manila Film Festival but failed to qualify as an official entry. The film opened in theaters on July 17, 2013, as part of Star Cinema's 20th Anniversary presentation.

== Plot ==
=== Prologue ===
Due to a road rage between two buses, an accident occurs which puts the lives of its passengers in jeopardy. But the ones greatly affected by such event are a middle-aged woman named Fiesta (Eugene Domingo), an old and retired family patriarch Tonio (Leo Martinez), and a young man named Caloy (Enchong Dee). These three people are pierced through a single steel bar – a dangerous situation that even their doctors find hard to solve. But even before this unfortunate circumstance, these three have their share of ill-fated lives.

=== Fiesta ===
Fiesta is a bus barker of Janus Express whose life revolves around taking care of her demented father Carding. Being a dedicated daughter to Carding turns her into a lonely spinster that scares men away with her fierce and masculine demeanor. Until she meets Nato (Jake Cuenca), a new driver hired by Janus Express that eventually wins her heart. But just when she thought that she’ll finally have her far-fetched happiness with Nato, things start to get complicated when she finds out Nato’s painful secret.

=== Tonio ===
Tonio is a retired old man who after getting past his prime and being a refuge to his family, now wants to fulfill his shrugged off dream of becoming a baker. He decides to use his pension to fulfill this dream. At first, his own family is skeptical about it but he eventually gets their support along with his friends to make it happen. Now, it’s all up to him to make this work and find out if this is a dream worth all that risk.

=== Caloy ===
Caloy is a young man preserving his virginity for his girlfriend Angel (Empress). They have made an agreement to give up their virginities to each other and only to each other. However, Caloy gets challenged to remain faithful to this pact because of the difficulties of the long distance relationship he shares with Angel. Moreover, he starts to doubt the loyalty of Angel to him and to their relationship because of a guy named Jun Rey who is seemingly getting involved with his girlfriend.

=== Epilogue ===
Dr. Nuguid told Fiesta that she will die but her unborn child will live. Tonio and Caloy pleaded that she should be first but failed as they were separated from the steel bar and were each brought to the operating rooms. Before dying, Fiesta told the doctor that he should stand as the father of her child and prevent the child from imitating her actions. The film ends with Nato visiting the grave of Fiesta, Tonio having a success with his bakery, Caloy lying in bed with Angel and Dr. Nuguid holding Fiesta's daughter (named Fiesta in honor of her mother).

== Cast ==
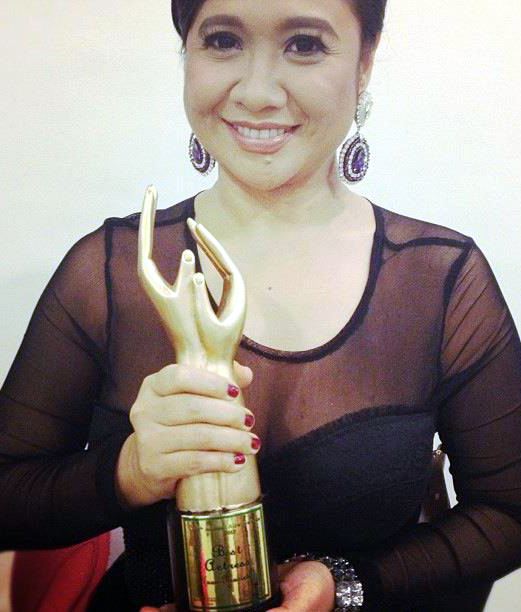
Eugene Domingo portrays Fiesta Dacanay

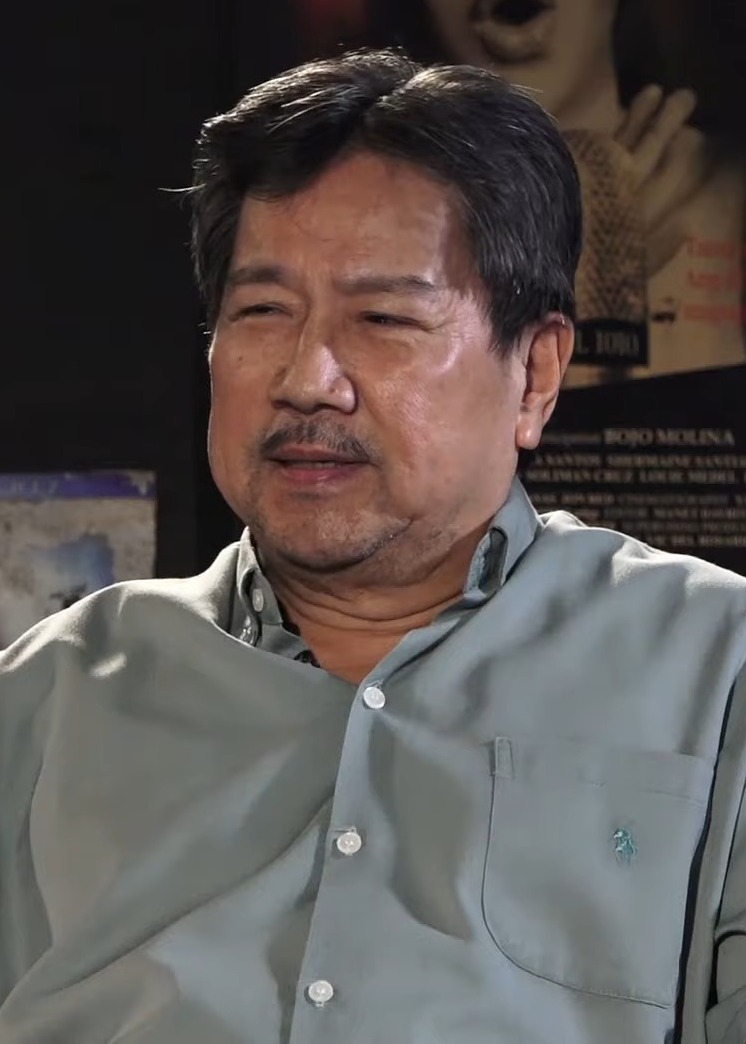
Leo Martinez portrays Antonio "Tonio" Sucat

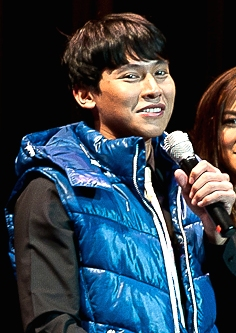
Enchong Dee portrays Carlos "Caloy" Sicat

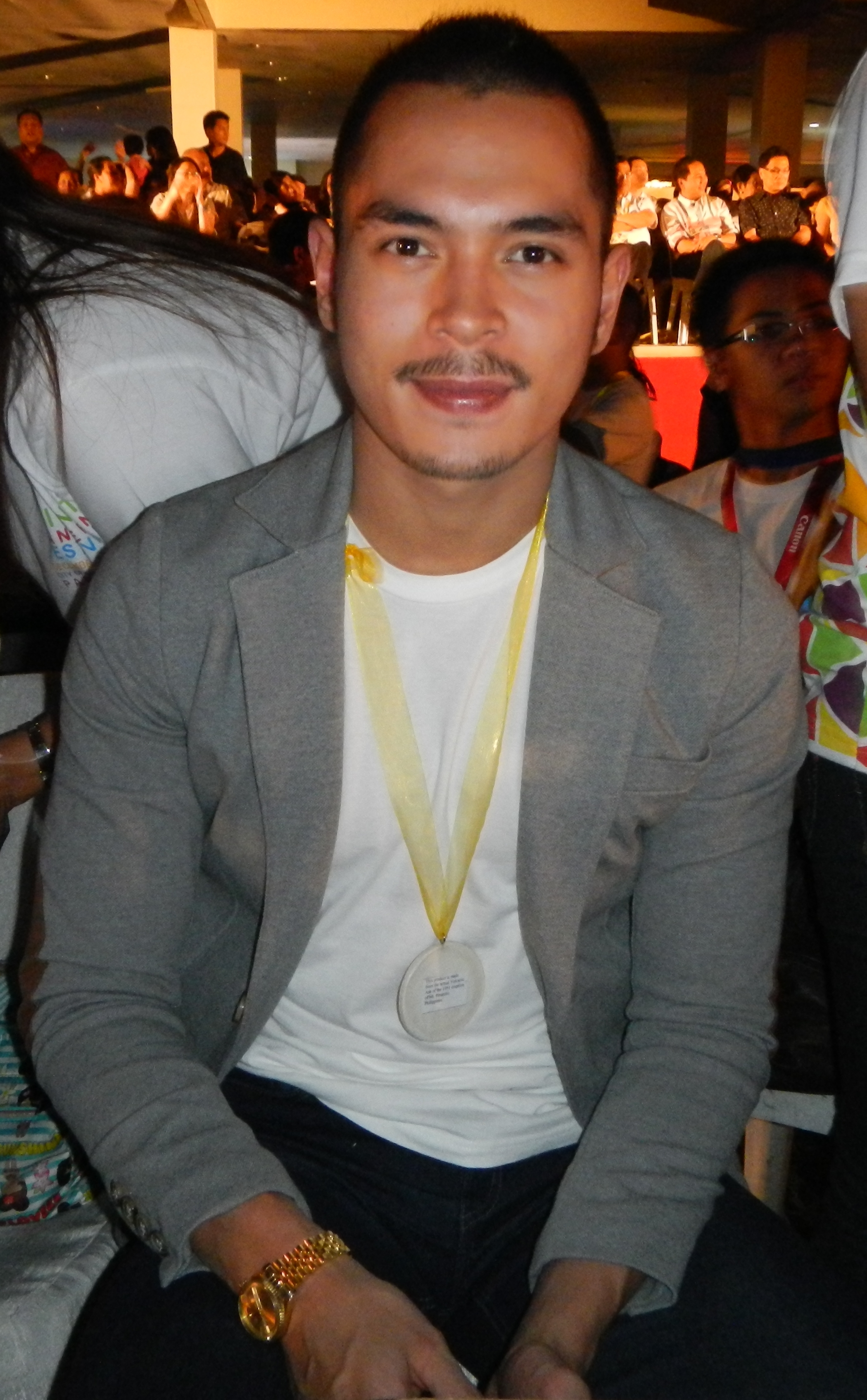
Jake Cuenca portrays Renato "Nato" Timbangkaya

=== Main ===
- Eugene Domingo as Fiesta Dacanay
- Leo Martinez as Antonio "Tonio" Sucat
- Enchong Dee as Carlos "Caloy" Sicat
- Empress Schuck as Angel
- Jake Cuenca as Renato "Nato" Timbangkaya

=== Supporting ===
- Manuel Chua as Bobby Sucat
- Nikki Valdez as Faith Sucat
- Kitkat as Rochelle
- Beauty Gonzalez as Jenna
- Rodjun Cruz as Mark
- Joe Vargas as Wayne
- Dimples Romana as Lolet
- Eda Nolan as Peachy
- Noel Trinidad as Carding Dacanay
- Bodjie Pascua as Lando
- Menggie Cobarrubias as Bert
- Carla Martinez as Mercy Sucat
- Jon Achaval as John
- Nor Domingo as Pugeda
- Hyubs Azarcon as Boyet
- Nico Antonio as Adrian Sucat
- Ariel Ureta as Dr. Nuguid
- Allyzon Lualhati as Dr. Paz
- Nicco Manalo as Dr. Sanchez
- Maliksi Morales as Street Kid/Kamatayan
