= Outside (2024 film) =

2024 horror film by Carlo Ledesma

- Promotional release poster
- Directed by: Carlo Ledesma
- Written by: Carlo Ledesma
- Produced by: Paul Soriano; Mark Victor
- Starring: Sid Lucero; Beauty Gonzalez; Marco Masa; Aiden Tyler Patdu
- Production company: Black Cap Pictures
- Distributed by: Netflix
- Release date: October 17, 2024
- Running time: 142 minutes
- Country: Philippines
- Language: Tagalog

Outside is a 2024 Philippine post-apocalyptic horror drama film written and directed by Carlo Ledesma. It stars Sid Lucero, Beauty Gonzalez, Marco Masa, and Aiden Tyler Patdu. The film tells the story of a family trying to outrun a zombie outbreak by returning to the father's childhood farmhouse.

== Plot ==
The Abel family—Francis, his wife Iris, and their sons Joshua and Lucas—flee a zombie outbreak in the city to Francis' parents' mansion on a sugarcane plantation. There, Francis finds his father and a servant dead by suicide after being infected and his mother reanimated as a zombie. After killing her, Francis and his family settle in the house. Francis suffers nightmares of his father's abuse in the basement as a child. His marriage is also strained after learning that Iris was unfaithful and that his elder brother, Diego, is Joshua's biological father.

Days later, Iris convinces Francis to search for a safer refuge, but they are forced to turn back and abandon their van at a zombie-infested bridge. Francis later leaves to retrieve the van but returns instead with fuel for the mansion's generator. Joshua learns of a safe zone over the radio and tries to convince his father to investigate, but Francis dismisses him and teaches him how to shoot a gun. The gunfire attracts a horde of zombies, trapping the family inside until Diego arrives and lures them away with his vehicle. The next day, Diego offers to accompany them to the safe zone, but Francis, resentful of his brother's favored status in their family and affair with Iris, rejects his help and forces him to leave at gunpoint. Diego leaves behind a map to the safe zone in case Francis changes his mind.

Francis overhears Iris deducing that the zombies are weakening and dying off with time. Descending into paranoia, he stages an attack outside, barricades the mansion, and locks his family inside. Joshua finds Diego's map and confronts Francis over dinner, leading to Iris finally admitting that she wants to leave Francis and Francis revealing that Joshua is not his son before burning the map in front of the family. Later that night, a wounded soldier named Corcuera arrives seeking shelter and confirms that the number of zombies are dwindling. He reveals that Diego, who had guided him to the mansion, was killed by zombies.

The next day, Joshua, fed up with his father's actions, leaves the mansion. Francis goes berserk, kills Corcuera with a hammer, and locks Iris and Lucas in the basement. That night, Lucas fakes an illness to lure Francis in, allowing Iris to stab him and lock him in the basement before escaping with Lucas. Francis tries to follow but is paralyzed by flashbacks of his father confining him. Meanwhile, Iris and Lucas are chased back inside by a reanimated Diego, who bites Lucas. Hearing their screams, Francis regains his senses, escapes the basement, and kills Diego, but collapses upon seeing Lucas bitten, leaving Iris to amputate his infected limb alone.

Francis returns to the checkpoint to retrieve their van but is shot by a panicked Joshua, who mistakes his father for a zombie due to his bloodied appearance and stuttering. As Joshua pleads for forgiveness, Francis acknowledges him as his son before dying. Joshua then drives the van to rescue Iris and Lucas.

== Cast ==
- Sid Lucero as Francis
- Beauty Gonzalez as Iris
- Marco Masa as Joshua "Josh"
- Aiden Tyler Patdu as Lucas
- Joel Torre as Arturo
- James Blanco as Diego
- Enchong Dee as Corcuera
- Bing Pimentel as Francis' mother

== Production ==
Carlo Ledesma cited family dramas and post-apocalyptic films such as The Day After and the Mad Max franchise as his inspiration for the film.

Beauty Gonzalez and Sid Lucero were confirmed to be part of the film in a press statement on a streaming platform on October 11, 2023. While Outside overtly tackles a zombie apocalypse, the production theme intended to incorporate mental health as a theme. Among these is generational trauma.

Principal photography was held in La Carlota and Kabankalan, Negros Occidental, the home province of Ledesma, Gonzales and Lucero. A Filipino-style mansion and a sugarcane farm were specific shooting locations. The film is 142 minutes long and was billeted by Netflix as its first original zombie film set in the Philippines.

Filming lasted around a month and was hampered by weather conditions. The zombies were portrayed by residents of the province in makeup. The zombies are capable of speech with the director intentionally not wanting them to be portrayed as "mindless monsters".

== Release ==
The film was initially set to release worldwide in Netflix originally on October 11, 2024 but was moved to October 17, 2024.

== Reception ==
On the review aggregator website Rotten Tomatoes, 80% of 10 critics' reviews are positive, with an average rating of 7.40/10. The film received a score of 71/100 from 22 reviews according to review aggregator website Kritikultura, indicating a generally positive reception.

Film critic Fred Hawson gave the film a 7 out of 10 rating and praised the film's cinematography and Lucero and Gonzalez's acting, while criticizing parts of the dialogue for being dragging.

=== Accolades ===
Accolades received by Outside
Year	Award	Category	Recipient(s)	Result	Ref.
2025	5th Pinoy Rebyu Awards	Best Lead Performance	Sid Lucero	Nominated	
2025	5th Pinoy Rebyu Awards	Best Production Design	Joseph Edward Sicangco	Nominated	
2025	8th EDDYS Awards	Best Picture	Outside	Nominated	
2025	8th EDDYS Awards	Best Actor	Sid Lucero	Nominated	
2025	8th EDDYS Awards	Best Director	Carlo Ladesma	Nominated	
2025	8th EDDYS Awards	Best Cinematography	Outside	Nominated	
2025	8th EDDYS Awards	Best Screenplay	Outside	Nominated	
2025	8th EDDYS Awards	Best Production Design	Outside	Nominated	
2025	8th EDDYS Awards	Best Visual Effects	Outside	Nominated	
2025	41st Star Awards for Movies	Indie Movie Production Designer of the Year	Jed Sicangco & Jerann Ordinario	Nominated	
2025	41st Star Awards for Movies	Indie Movie Sound Engineer of the Year	Allen Roy Santos	Won	
2025	41st Star Awards for Movies	Indie Movie Theme Song of the Year	“Will You Still Love Me” – Myka Magsaysay-Sigua	Nominated	
