= Marco Masa =

Filipino actor (born 2007)

- Born: Marco Antonio Moraleda Masa; August 1, 2007 (age 19); Antipolo, Rizal, Philippines
- Occupations: Actor; model
- Years active: 2012–present
- Agent(s): ABS-CBN Corporation (2013–2021); GMA Network (2022–present)
- Notable work: Nathaniel
- Height: 1.78 m (5 ft 10 in)
- Website: Official website

Marco Antonio Moraleda Masa (Tagalog: [mˈɑː͡ɹko͡ʊ mˈɑːsə]; born August 1, 2007) is a Filipino actor and model. He is currently an exclusive talent under GMA Network's talent management agency Sparkle.

Masa started out as a child actor and gained recognition for his performance in the titular role of the television series Nathaniel (2015). He also appeared as Wacky in Honesto (2013) and as Eldon in the film Maria Leonora Teresa (2014).

== Early life and education ==
Marco Antonio Moraleda Masa was born on August 1, 2007 in Antipolo, Rizal, to his parents Antonio Masa and Soledad Masa. He started his acting career at the age of four, after a talent scout discovered him at his family's computer shop and asked his parents’ permission for him to audition for television commercials. Masa completed his junior high school with honors at the Pleasant Mount School in 2024. He attended in senior high school at Our Lady of Fatima University in Antipolo and graduated in 2026.

== Career ==
Masa initially appeared in supporting roles in ABS-CBN television series such as Honesto before gaining wider recognition for his portrayal of the titular character in Nathaniel, an angel sent to Earth on a mission.

In 2022, Masa signed an exclusive contract with GMA Network and Sparkle, one year after his primary media company allegiance with ABS-CBN Corporation under Star Magic was withdrawn following the denial of its free TV broadcast franchise renewal. He later portrayed Benjamin "Benjie" Nakpil in Black Rider, and appeared in other productions such as Sparkle U, Daig Kayo ng Lola Ko, and Maka.

In 2023, he regained allegiance with ABS-CBN with It's Showtime albeit now only secondarily due to the collaboration of his current primary media company allegiance GMA with ABS-CBN.

In 2024, Masa appeared in the zombie film Outside.

In 2025, Masa appeared in the eco-horror film The Caretakers, as well as the zombie film Outside. He was also featured in the television drama crime series, Akusada, portraying the role of Tristan. In October of that year, Masa was announced as one of the housemates for Pinoy Big Brother: Celebrity Collab Edition 2.0. One of the Kapuso housemates, he joined the show under the moniker “Ang Wonder Brother ng Antipolo.” He was the season's second evictee, leaving the show on Day 36, before returning as a wildcard housemate on Day 79. He faced fellow Kapuso housemate Anton Vinzon, before eventually winning the wildcard, returning to the game on Day 82.

== Filmography ==
Key
†	Denotes films that have not yet been released

=== Film ===
Year	Title	Role	Notes	Ref.
2013	Ang Huling Henya	Young Mark	Uncredited	
2014	Maybe This Time	Danno	Credited as Marco Antonio Masa	
2014	Maria Leonora Teresa	Eldon Jacinto		
2014	Moron 5.2: The Transformation	Marcos "Macoy" Macapagal		
2015	Beauty and the Bestie	Jimbo Villavicencio	41st Metro Manila Film Festival entry	
2017	Tatlong Bibe	Noah	Credited as Marco Antonio Masa	
2019	Sunshine Family	Max		
2023	Firefly	Billy and Erika's son	49th Metro Manila Film Festival entry	
2024	Outside	Josh		
2025	The Caretakers	Gani		
2026	58th			
2026	Huwag Kang Titingin	Brian Alfreta		

=== Television ===
Year	Title	Role	Notes	Ref.
2012	Cielo de Angelina	Marlon		
2013	Huwag Ka Lang Mawawala	Peter Deomedes		
2013	Honesto	Wacky	Credited as Marco Antonio Masa	
2015	Nathaniel	Nathaniel M. Laxamana		
2015–2021	ASAP	Himself / Guest		
2016–2019	Goin' Bulilit	Himself / Various		
2018	The Blood Sisters	Young Rocco Fernandez		
2018	Bagani	Tintoy		
2018	Your Face Sounds Familiar Kids (season 2)	Himself / Contestant	8th placer	
2019	Kargo	Sammy	TV Mini series	
2019	The Killer Bride	Young Luis Dela Torre	Episodes 1–5	
2019–2020	Team Yey!	Himself / Host		
2020	24/7	Claudio Jacinto		
2022	Start-Up PH	Young Tristan		
2023	Sparkle U: #Ghosted	Leon		
2023	Pepito Manaloto: Tuloy ang Kuwento	Elmer	Guest role	
2023	Royal Blood	Young Gustavo Royales	Uncredited	
2023	Luv Is: Love at First Read	Dale Calan De Makapili		
2023–2024	Black Rider	Benjamin "Benjie" Nakpil		
2023–present	All-Out Sundays	Himself / Performer		
2023–present	It's Showtime	Himself / Guest		
2024	Lilet Matias: Attorney-at-Law	Xander		
2024	Family Feud Philippines	Himself / Player		
2024–2025	Maka	Marco Reyes		
2025	Akusada	Tristan Astor		
2025	Maka Lovestream	Rusty/Benok		
2025	Pinoy Big Brother: Celebrity Collab Edition 2.0	Housemate	Regular Housemate (Day 36); Wild Card (Day 79)	
2026	Kapamilya, Deal or No Deal	Himself/Lucky Stars	Episodes: "Episode 15: Long Mejia" (Case 1, ₱10); "Episode 20: Ynez Veneracion" (Case 1, ₱500,000); "Episode 26: Jannah Alanise" (Case 6, ₱500,000); "Episode 27: Jenny Miller" (Case 10, ₱400); Total: ₱1,000,410	
2026	You're My Favorite Song	Zion Licaro		
TBA	The Way Back To You †	Bogs	Supporting role	

=== Anthologies ===
Year	Title	Role	Notes	Ref.
2015	Wansapanataym	Kenny	Episode: "Kenny Kaliwete"	
2016	Wansapanataym	Chokee	Episodes 275–283	
2016	Maalaala Mo Kaya	Young Joseph	Episode: "Armas"	
2017	Maalaala Mo Kaya	1st Generation Recho	Episode: "Tahanan"	
2017	Wansapanataym	Bitoy	Episodes 335–346	
2017	Maalaala Mo Kaya	Young George	Episode: "Traysikel"	
2017	Maalaala Mo Kaya	Young Roy	Episode: "Mansanas at Juice"	
2018	Maalaala Mo Kaya	Young Freddie	Episode: "Galon"	
2018	Maalaala Mo Kaya	Young Marlon	Episode: "Manibela"	
2018	Maalaala Mo Kaya	Nilo, 10	Episode: "Dalandan"	
2019	Maalaala Mo Kaya	Young Paul, 2009	Episode: "Jersey"	
2019	Maalaala Mo Kaya	Jason	Episode: "Tubig"	
2020	Maalaala Mo Kaya	Young Kobe	Episode: "Mata"	
2020	Maalaala Mo Kaya	Young Jerry	Episode: "Mural"	
2022	Tadhana	Iñigo	Episodes 230–233	
2022	Magpakailanman	Matthew	Episode: "A Christmas Miracle: The Madrid Family Story"	
2023	Daig Kayo ng Lola Ko	Matt	Episodes 210–212	
2023	Imbestigador	Daniel	Episode: "Imbestigador: Batangas Kidnap Case"	
2024	Daig Kayo ng Lola Ko	Jiro	Episodes 242–244	
2024	Magpakailanman	Hubert	Episode: "Ang Pambansang Yobab: The Euleen Castro Story"	
2024	Magpakailanman	James	Episode: "Haunted House for Rent"	
2026	Barangay Love Stories	Harry	Episode: "Aking Paruparo"	

== Accolades ==
Awards and NominationsAwards and nominations received by Marco Masa
Award	Year	Category	Nominated work	Result	Ref.
7th Village Pipol Choice Award	2026	TV Supporting Actor of the Year	Akusada	Won	
Anak TV Seal Awards	2025	Makabata Star	—N/a	Won	
Philippine Finest Business Awards and Outstanding Achievers	2024	Promising Love Team (Note: Shared with Ashley Sarmiento.)	—N/a	Won	
Philippine Outstanding Men & Women Awards	2023	Outstanding Youth of the Philippines	—N/a	Won	
EdukCircle Awards	2018	Best Child TV Artist	—N/a	Won	
Metro Manila Film Festival	2015	Best Child Performer	Beauty and the Bestie	Nominated	
PMPC Star Awards for Movies	2016	Movie Child Performer of the Year	Beauty and the Bestie	Nominated	
PMPC Star Awards for Movies	2018	Movie Child Performer of the Year	Tatlong Bibe	Won	
PMPC Star Awards for Television	2015	Best Child Performer	Nathaniel	Won	
PMPC Star Awards for Television	2016	Best Child Performer	My Super D	Nominated	
