= Northern Lights: A Journey to Love =

- Theatrical release poster
- Directed by: Dondon S. Santos
- Screenplay by: Onay Sales
- Story by: Rona Lean Sales
- Produced by: Lily Y. Monteverde; Roselle Y. Monteverde; Charo Santos-Concio; Malou N. Santos; Piolo Pascual; Joyce Bernal; Erickson Raymundo
- Starring: Piolo Pascual; Yen Santos; Raikko Mateo
- Cinematography: Zach Sycip
- Edited by: Chrisel Galeno-Desuasido
- Music by: Cesar Francis Concio
- Production companies: Regal Entertainment; ABS-CBN Film Productions; Spring Films
- Distributed by: Star Cinema
- Release date: March 29, 2017
- Running time: 100 minutes
- Country: Philippines
- Language: Filipino

Northern Lights: A Journey to Love is a 2017 Filipino drama film directed by Dondon S. Santos and written by Onay Sales that stars Piolo Pascual, Yen Santos, and Raikko Mateo. The film is a collaboration between Regal Entertainment, Star Cinema, and Spring Films. The film's executive producers were Lily Monteverde, Roselle Monteverde, Charo Santos-Concio, Malou Santos, Piolo Pascual, Joyce Bernal, and Erickson Raymundo. The film was released on March 29, 2017.

== Plot ==
In the frozen expanse of Alaska, Charlie Sr. (Piolo Pascual), a Filipino immigrant drifting through a solitary, carefree existence, is suddenly confronted with the arrival of his seven-year-old son, Charlie Jr. (Raikko Mateo). Left behind in the Philippines years ago, the boy now stands as a living reminder of Charlie’s past choices. Unprepared for fatherhood, Charlie stumbles through the routines of caregiving—school forms, doctor visits, bedtime rituals—while battling guilt, fear of attachment, and the ghosts of abandonment that haunt him.

Into this fragile world steps Angel (Yen Santos), a spirited Filipina trainee who has come to Alaska in search of her missing mother. Her journey through scattered clues and cold bureaucracies mirrors Charlie’s own struggle: both are chasing fragments of family, both are weighed down by loss. Their paths cross when Angel’s inquiries connect to people tied to Charlie’s past. At first, their encounters are tentative—her warmth and persistence clashing with his guarded silence.

The turning point arrives in crisis: Charlie Jr. falls gravely ill. Forced to lean on Angel, Charlie admits his fears and failures. In the glow of hospital lights and the quiet of sleepless nights, a fragile bond begins to form. Angel helps him navigate the practicalities of parenting, while Charlie learns to open himself to responsibility and connection.

As Angel uncovers the truth about her mother—choices made under economic and emotional strain rather than malice—she shifts from anger to acceptance, choosing closure over confrontation. Charlie, meanwhile, begins to rebuild: steady work, shared meals, bedtime stories, and the slow weaving of trust with his son.

The film crescendos not with spectacle but with intimacy. Under the shimmering aurora borealis, Charlie embraces his role as a father, Angel finds peace in her search, and Charlie Jr. settles into a more secure life. The northern lights become a luminous symbol of hope—fragile yet enduring. The story closes on a note of quiet optimism: fractured bonds remain, but new responsibilities and connections illuminate a path toward healing.

== Cast ==
=== Main Cast ===
- Piolo Pascual as Charlie Sr.
- Yen Santos as Angel
- Raikko Mateo as Charlie Jr.

=== Supporting Cast ===
- Joel Torre as Kado
- Sandy Andolong as Juliet
- Tirso Cruz III as Ricardo
- Maricar Reyes as Joyce
- Glydel Mercado as Leah
- Jerald Napoles as James
- K Brosas as Arlene

== Production ==
Northern Lights was shot in and around Queenstown in South Island of New Zealand, to act as Alaska. The film employed production crew from Australia and New Zealand. On the other hand, the scenes with aurora borealis were actually shot in Alaska.

== Reception ==
The film is graded "B" by the Cinema Evaluation Board of the Philippines.

=== Critical reception ===
Oggs Cruz of Rappler in a review wrote: "[the] most unfortunate about Northern Lights is that the film actually tries to define romantic relationships in a way that is not entirely escapist. The milieu has actual promise." He then concluded that there is nothing extraordinary about the film. Mari-an Santos of Philippine Entertainment Portal in a review wrote: "the story, though nothing groundbreaking, pulls the heartstrings and will appeal to a wide variety of audiences." She also added: "the development of their characters feels too abrupt, since the sequences do not flow as naturally as possible." Pablo A. Tariman of The Philippine Star in a very positive review of the film, wrote: "the story and screenplay were able to wield a solid film stunning in its simplicity but with a lot of soul in it." He then concluded that "it is a remarkably acted film and sensitively directed as well. The film tugs at your heart from beginning to end." For a Philippines-based audience, the film may drag a bit but it rapturously captures the slow rhythm of picturesque but sleepy locales like Anchorage and Fairbanks, Alaska.
