= The Caretakers (2025 film) =

2025 Philippine horror film

- Theatrical release poster
- Directed by: Shugo Praico
- Written by: Shugo Praico; John Carlo Pacala
- Produced by: Lino S. Cayetano; Philip King
- Starring: Iza Calzado; Dimples Romana
- Edited by: Moises M. M. Zee
- Music by: Jose Antonio Buencamino
- Production companies: Rein Entertainment; Regal Films
- Distributed by: Regal Films
- Release date: 26 February 2025
- Running time: 90 minutes
- Country: Philippines
- Language: Filipino

The Caretakers is a 2025 Philippine horror film directed by Shugo Praico. Starring Iza Calzado and Dimples Romana. It was released on February 26, 2025.

== Plot ==
The eco-horror film focuses on an intense conflict between two mothers, Audrey (Iza Calzado) and Lydia (Dimples Romana), regarding the possession of a piece of land. Audrey, a city dweller, comes to assert her claim over the land that belongs to her husband’s family, while Lydia, the guardian, staunchly defends the land that her family has inhabited for generations.

== Cast ==
- Iza Calzado as Audrey
- Dimples Romana as Lydia
- Marco Masa
- Althea Ruedas
- Ashley Sarmiento as Ali
- Erin Espiritu
- Erika Clemente
- Inka Magnaye
- Jake Taylor

== Accolades ==
Accolades received by The Caretakers
Award	Date of ceremony	Category	Recipient(s)	Result	Ref.
2025 Asian Academy Creative Awards	October 1, 2025	Best Actress in a Supporting Role	Dimples Romana	Won	
