= Spring Films =

Philippine independent film production company

- Company type: Privately held company
- Industry: Motion pictures
- Founded: 2009; 17 years ago
- Headquarters: Metro Manila, Philippines
- Key people: Piolo Pascual; Joyce Bernal; Erickson Raymundo
- Products: Films

Spring Films is an independent film production firm founded and managed by actor and film producer Piolo Pascual, director Joyce Bernal and Cornerstone Entertainment president Erickson Raymundo.

== About ==
Spring Films is the recipient of the 49th Guilliermo Mendoza Memorial Scholarship Foundation for 2018. Spring Films was founded by actor-producer Piolo Pascual, filmmaker Joyce E. Bernal, and the company's President Erickson Raymundo. For about a decade, Spring Films has been producing cinema, starting with Kimmy Dora: Kambal Sa Kiyeme that eventually became a popular Filipino trilogy. Their 2017 film Kita Kita (I SeeYou), starring Empoy Marquez and Alessandra de Rossi is considered as the top earning independent Filipino film in history.

Spring Films released its first animated film Hayop Ka! on Netflix from the Philippines, by filmmaker Avid Liongoren in October 2020. In 2021, in partnership once again with Netflix, Spring Films presents to the market Alessandra De Rossi's directorial debut film My Amanda.

== Filmography ==
Year	Released	Title	Director	Cast	Associated Film Production	Notes	Ref..
2009	September 2	Kimmy Dora: Kambal sa Kiyeme	Joyce Bernal	Eugene Domingo	ABS-CBN Film Productions, Inc. MJM Productions; Solar Pictures	First film produced by Spring Films	
2012	June 13	Kimmy Dora and the Temple of Kiyeme	Joyce Bernal	Eugene Domingo	ABS-CBN Film Productions, Inc.		
2013	December 25	Kimmy Dora: Ang Kiyemeng Prequel	Chris Martinez	Eugene Domingo; Sam Milby	MJM Productions; Quantum Films	Entry to the 2013 Metro Manila Film Festival	
2014	November 12	Relaks, It's Just Pag-ibig	Antoinette Jadaone; Irene Villamor	Iñigo Pascual; Julian Estrada; Sofia Andres		Distributed by Star Cinema	
2017	March 29	Northern Lights: A Journey to Love	Dondon Santos	Piolo Pascual; Yen Santos; Raikko Mateo	Regal Entertainment, Inc. ABS-CBN Film Productions, Inc.	Shot in Australia, New Zealand, and Alaska	
2017	July 19	Kita Kita	Sigrid Andrea Bernardo	Alessandra de Rossi; Empoy Marquez	Viva Films	Highest grossing Philippine independent film; Premiered at 12th Osaka Asian Film Festival; Shot in Japan	
2017	September 27	Last Night	Joyce Bernal	Toni Gonzaga; Piolo Pascual	N² Productions; ABS-CBN Film Productions, Inc.		
2018	February 7	Meet Me in St. Gallen	Irene Villamor	Carlo Aquino; Bela Padilla	Viva Films	Shot in Switzerland	
2018	August 3	Kuya Wes	James Mayo	Ogie Alcasid; Ina Raymundo	A-Team; Awkward Penguin	Entry to the 14th Cinemalaya Independent Film Festival	
2019	May 15	Ang Hupa	Lav Diaz	Hazel Orencio; Joel Lamangan; Shaina Magdayao; Piolo Pascual; Pinky Amador	Sine Olivia		
2019	June 5	Sunshine Family	Kim Tai-Sik	Nonie Buencamino; Shamine Buencamino; Sue Ramirez; Marco Masa	Film Line		
2019	September 13	I'm Ellenya L.	Boy 2 Quizon	Maris Racal; Iñigo Pascual	N^{2} Productions; Cobalt Entertainment	Entry to the 3rd Pista ng Pelikuang Pilipino	
2019	November 23	Silly Red Shoes	James Mayo	Francine Diaz; Kyle Echarri	Dreamscape Entertainment	iWant original	
2019	December 16	Manilennials	E del Mundo	Nicco Manalo; Ria Atayde; Chai Fonacier; Mela Habijan; Fifth Solomon	Barrio Dos	iWant original	
2020	October 29	Hayop Ka!	Avid Liongoren	Angelica Panganiban; Robin Padilla; Sam Milby	Rocketsheep Studios	Netflix original animated film	
TBA	TBA	Low Firm	Joyce Bernal	TBA			
2021	April 5	Niña Niño	Thop Nazareno	Maja Salvador; Empoy Marquez; Noel Comia Jr.	Cignal TV; Cornerstone Studios	TV series currently airing on TV5 through a blocktime agreement	
2021	July 15	My Amanda	Alessandra De Rossi	Piolo Pascual Alessandra de Rossi		Netflix original film	
2023	March 23	Walang KaParis	Sigrid Bernardo	Empoy Marquez Alessandra de Rossi	Viva Films	Amazon original film	
2025	December 25	Manila's Finest	Raymond Red	Piolo Pascual; Enrique Gil	Cignal TV; MQuest Ventures	Entry to the 51st Metro Manila Film Festival	
2026	April 27	My Bespren Emman	Derick Cabrido; Jerome Chavez Pobocan	JM de Guzman; Shaina Magdayao et al.	TV5 Entertainment; Numinous Narratives	TV series soon to air on TV5	
