= Akusada =

2025 Philippine television drama series

- Title card
- Also known as: Her Name Was Carolina
- Genre: Crime drama; Mystery
- Directed by: Dominic Zapata
- Starring: Andrea Torres
- Theme music composer: Ann Margaret Figueroa
- Opening theme: "Alam ko Lang" by Jeniffer Maravilla
- Country of origin: Philippines
- Original language: Tagalog
- No. of episodes: 89

Production
- Running time: 21–29 minutes
- Production company: GMA Entertainment Group

Original release
- Network: GMA Network
- Release: June 30 – October 31, 2025

Akusada (transl. accuser / international title: Her Name Was Carolina) is a 2025 Philippine television drama crime mystery series broadcast by GMA Network. Directed by Dominic Zapata, it stars Andrea Torres in the title role. It premiered on June 30, 2025 on the network's Afternoon Prime line up. The series concluded on October 31, 2025, with a total of 89 episodes.

The series is streaming online on YouTube.

== Premise ==
In order to protect her family, a woman will disguise under a different identity. Her past will later catches up to her.

== Cast and characters ==
Lead cast

- Andrea Torres as Carol / Lorena

Supporting cast

- Benjamin Alves as Wilfred
- Lianne Valentin as Roni
- Marco Masa as Tristan
- Ashley Sarmiento as Amber
- Jeniffer Maravilla as Fern
- Arnold Reyes as Dennis
- Erin Espiritu as Lia
- Shyr Valdez as Pilar

Recurring cast

- Ronnie Liang as Damian
- Ahron Villena as Gian
- Eunice Lagusad

Guest cast

- Max Collins
- Sandy Andolong
- Tonton Gutierrez
- Jo Berry as Lilet Matias

== Development ==
The series was announced in March 2025, alongside cast member, Andrea Torres and director Dominic Zapata. Additional cast members including Benjamin Alves, Lianne Valentin, Marco Masa, Princess Aliyah and Jeniffer Maravilla were announced in April 2025. Actress Jo Berry made a guest appearance in the series, reprising her role as Lilet Matias in the Philippine legal drama series Lilet Matias: Attorney-at-Law.

== Ratings ==
According to AGB Nielsen Philippines' Nationwide Urban Television Audience Measurement People in television homes, the pilot episode of Akusada earned a 5.3% rating.
