= Maria Leonora Teresa =

2014 horror film by Wenn V. Deramas

- Theatrical release poster
- Directed by: Wenn V. Deramas
- Screenplay by: Keiko A. Aquino
- Story by: Wenn V. Deramas
- Produced by: Charo Santos-Concio; Malou N. Santos
- Starring: Iza Calzado; Zanjoe Marudo; Jodi Sta. Maria
- Cinematography: Charlie Peralta
- Edited by: Marya Ignacio
- Music by: Carmina Cuya
- Production company: Star Cinema
- Distributed by: ABS-CBN Film Productions
- Release date: September 17, 2014
- Running time: 102 minutes
- Country: Philippines
- Language: Filipino
- Box office: ₱72.7 million

Maria Leonora Teresa is a 2014 Filipino supernatural horror film directed by Wenn V. Deramas and written by Keiko A. Aquino from Deramas' story concept. Named after Guy and Pip's doll of the same name, the film stars Iza Calzado, Zanjoe Marudo and Jodi Sta. Maria.

Produced and distributed by ABS-CBN Film Productions, it was theatrically released in the Philippines on September 17, 2014.

== Plot ==
During the inauguration of Little Magnolia School's new building, the town mayor tells the school's owner, Stanley, of a past incident in the school where a student died. Stanley's wife, Faith, is in the school's restroom when the ghost of a boy appears.

The next day, Faith and two other parents, teacher Julio and Stella, mourn the deaths of their respective daughters, Maria, Leonora, and Teresa, in an accident during the school's field trip. To help them cope with their loss, a psychiatrist, Manolo, offers them life-sized living dolls to look after.

Julio, who immediately accepted the offer, begins seeing the effect of his doll on him. He tells Faith and Stella, both of whom initially refused the dolls due to their great resemblance to their respective daughters, causing them further grief. Faith heeds Julio and takes the Maria doll but soon reveals her pregnancy to Stanley, who suggests that she dispose of it. Stella still refuses to take the Teresa doll but eventually relents when her unfaithful husband Don takes it instead.

As the three parents recover with their dolls, hauntings begin to occur. Julio was even reprimanded by the school principal for bringing his doll to class, scaring students. The dolls then start to kill people, beginning when Leonora throws the school principal off a balcony. Maria fatally stabs Shirley, one of her family's housemaids, after she foils her plan to make Faith fall and miscarry. Teresa starts a killing frenzy with Don and his mistress, Cherie. However, her attempt to kill his mistress' son, Joshua, is interrupted when the authorities arrive at the scene, causing her to flee. Afterwards, she kills her grandmother, Linda, by impaling her with the sword of a St. Michael statue.

Faith and Stella blame Julio for offering the dolls. Julio denies the dolls' involvement. Faith then brings up the past school incident, where the three of them are apparently involved; Julio then denies his involvement and storms off. Stella and her brother prepare to move away, but then Teresa tries to kill Stella.

After Faith's other housemaid, Thelma, also notices the hauntings, she refers Faith and Stanley to her faith healer cousin, Augusto, who realizes that the dolls are controlled by someone with knowledge of witchcraft. Through a séance, the ghost that appeared in the school bathroom is revealed to be Eldon, the student who died in the past incident in the school, and the son of Manolo, who happens to be the one controlling the dolls.

Leonora lures Julio to Manolo's lair and knocks him out. The three dolls then meet and kill Stanley. Faith, Stella, and Augusto arrive to see Julio tied, after which they are knocked out by the dolls. After they awaken, Manolo shared his plan to avenge the death of his son. Eldon had the ability to see the future and envisioned the school incident. He then told his classmates, causing panic. Julio then punished Eldon by locking him in a classroom next to the school's science laboratory, which was experiencing a gas leak. A janitor unwittingly lit a cigarette, causing a fire that killed Eldon. Teresa, whom Eldon earlier on warned to stay away from the classroom, then told Stella, who then dismissed it since she had already made several bribes to the school to make up for Teresa's poor grades. Lastly, Stanley and Faith covered up the incident by bribing investigators and silencing Eldon's guardian. Manolo was abroad when his son died. Manolo tries to finish his ritual to turn the parents into dolls, but Julio manages to free himself and the others and disrupt the ritual. Manolo fights back, and in the ensuing scuffle, Faith and Stella successfully destroy their dolls, but Julio lets Leonora escape. Manolo overpowers Augusto and impales Julio. Faith and Stella take Eldon's body and give him a proper burial. Manolo then appears before the two, intending to kill them, but Julio appears and kills Manolo before dying. Stella, who has adopted Joshua, and Faith, who successfully gives birth, visit Julio's grave.

In the mid-credits scene, Julio gives the Leonora doll to another parent grieving the death of her daughter from the field trip accident.

== Cast ==
Lead Cast

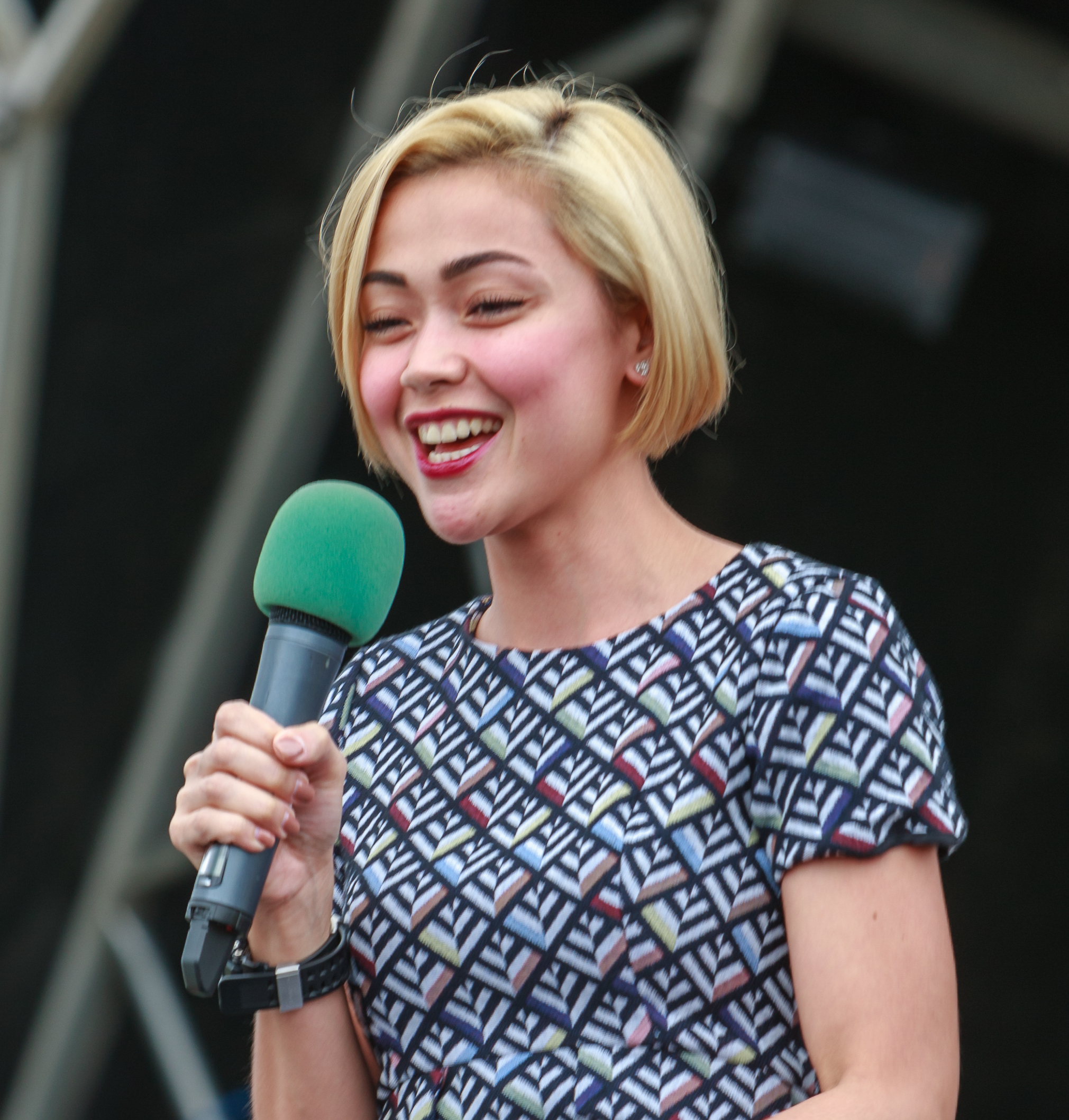
Jodi Sta. Maria as Stella de Castro

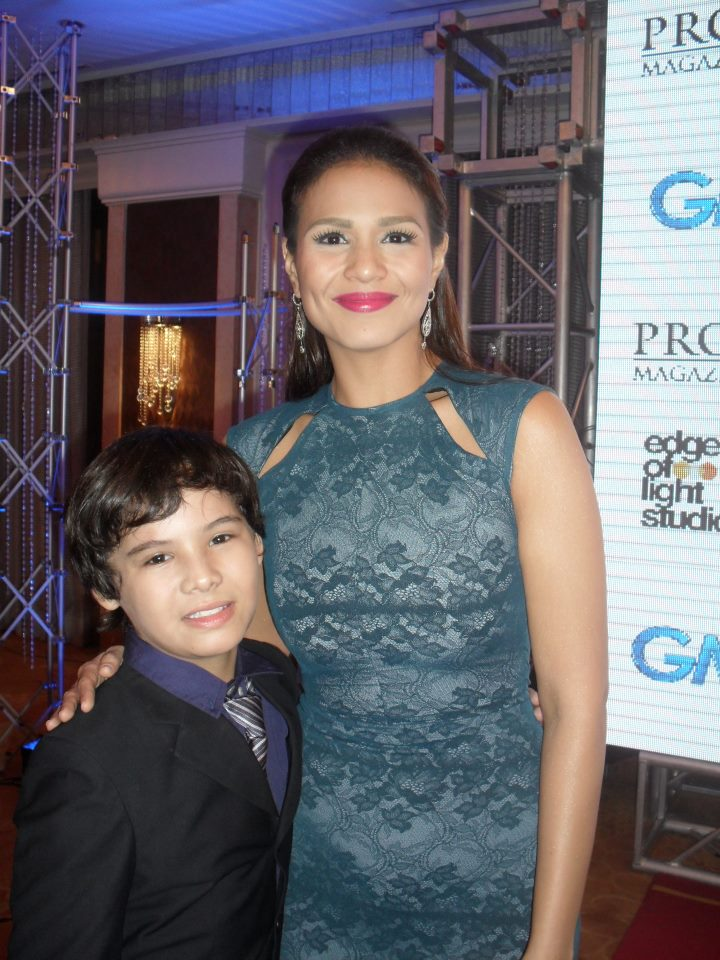
Iza Calzado as Faith Pardo

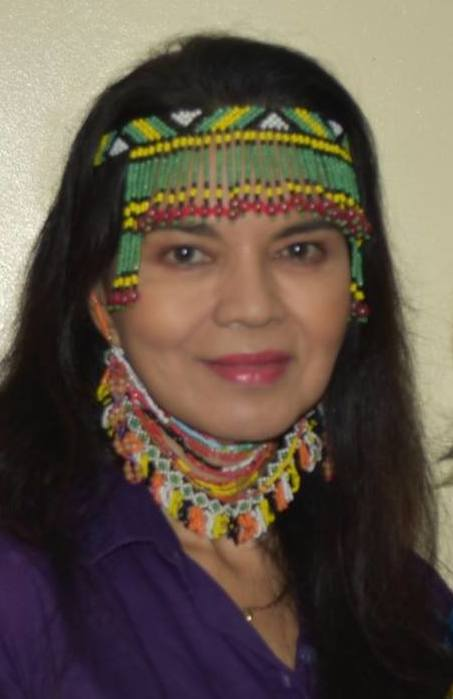
Maria Isabel Lopez as Linda

- Jodi Sta. Maria as Stella De Castro
- Iza Calzado as Faith Pardo
- Zanjoe Marudo as Julio Sacdalan

=== Supporting cast ===
- Rhed Bustamante as Maria Ann Pardo/Voice of Maria Doll
- Jonicka Cyleen Movido as Leonora Vera/Voice of Leonora Doll
- Juvy Lyn Bison as Teresa De Castro/Voice of Teresa Doll
- Marco Masa as Eldon Jacinto
- Dante Ponce as Stanley Pardo
- Joem Bascon as Don De Castro
- Cris Villanueva as Dr. Manolo Apacible
- Maria Isabel Lopez as Linda
- Robert Bermudez as Robert
- Tess Antonio as Shirley

Special Participation

- Joey Paras† as Augusto
- Ruby Ruiz as Principal Gilaria Evangeline Punongbayan
- Eagle Riggs as Teacher Danilo
- Dang Cruz as Teacher Socorro
- Atak Araña as School Janitor
- Jaycee Domincel as Bus Driver
- June Macasaet as Mr. Tenorio
- Niña Dolino as Cherie
- John Jeffrey Carlos as Co-teacher
- Paolo Rodriguez as Policeman
- Mike Lloren as Eldon's Guardian
- Daisy Cariño as School Teacher
- Giovanni Baldeserri as Mayor
- Olive Cruz as Dra. Ana Fajardo
- Eric Sison as Psychiatrist
- Evelyn Santos as Stella's maid
- Roi Calilong as Driver
- Raul Montesa as Faith's Lawyer

== Reception ==
Reviews for the film were mixed to positive, with some critics praising the first act of the film for its atmosphere, while criticizing the final act for being too funny to be scary. Jodi Sta. Maria, Iza Calzado and Zanjoe Marudo were also praised for their performance.

== See also ==
- List of ghost films
- Killer toys
- M3GAN, a 2022 American film with a similar plot
