= Beauty Gonzalez =

Filipina-Spanish actress and former reality show contestant (born 1991)

Beauty Gonzalez-Crisologo
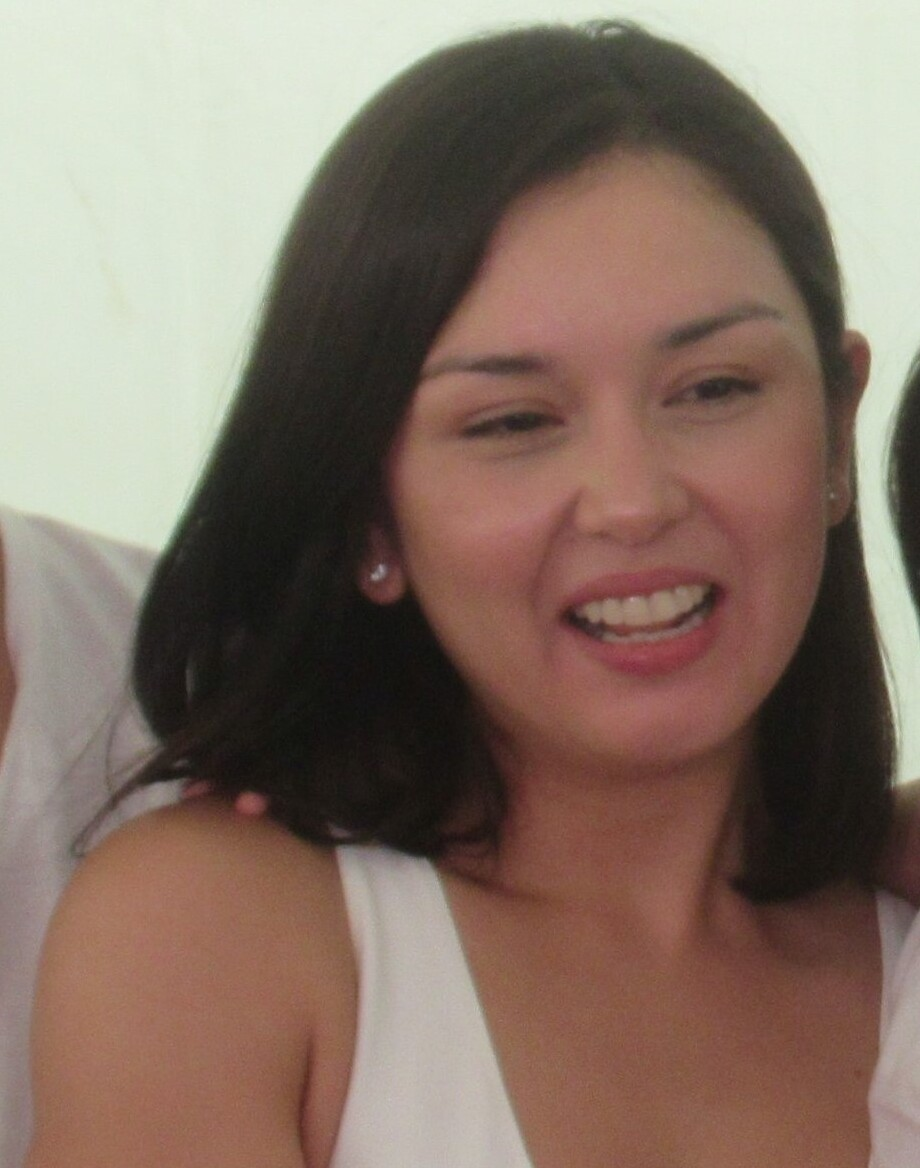
- Gonzalez in 2023
- Born: Christine Marie Luche Gonzalez; May 28, 1991 (age 35); Dumaguete, Negros Oriental, Philippines
- Occupations: Actress; host; model; vlogger
- Years active: 2008–present
- Agents: Star Magic (2008–20); ALV Talent Circuit (2015–present); TV5 (2009; 2020–21); GMA Network (2021–present)
- Height: 1.70 m (5 ft 7 in)
- Spouse: Norman Crisologo (m. 2017)
- Children: 1
- Military career
- Allegiance: Philippines
- Branch: Air Force Reserve; PNP-Aviation Security Command
- Service years: 2020–present
- Unit: Special Operation Unit

Christine Marie Luche Gonzalez-Crisologo, (Note: Tagalog pronunciation: [ɡonˈsalɛs kɾɪˈsɔloɣo]) also known as Beauty Gonzalez (born May 28, 1991), is a Filipina actress.

== Biography ==
Beauty Gonzalez was born as Christine Marie Luche Gonzalez in Dumaguete to Carina Luche, a Spanish-Filipina who hails from Cebu and Ibarra Manuel González, a Spaniard. Her father was a former professional Jai Alai player in Manila. He had coconut and sugar cane farms in Pamplona, Negros Oriental. Her mother comes from a political family in Cebu. She has one older brother. She attended St. Louis - Don Bosco and then Silliman University for college. She later dropped out to join Pinoy Big Brother.

Prior to joining Pinoy Big Brother, she was once chosen as one of Cebu's 12 Prettiest Teens, and she was crowned the Miss Teen Philippines - Central Visayas in 2006.

== Personal life ==
Beauty and Norman Crisologo, an art curator whom she has a twenty-year age difference, became engaged in March 2017, and the couple married in May at a ceremony in Tagaytay. Gonzalez gave birth to her daughter in February 2016.

In July 2023, Gonzalez attracted controversy after wearing a necklace and earrings made of "ancestral gold" to the GMA Gala. She had wished to showcase Filipino culture. The gold pieces were reworked eye and mouth covers from centuries ago excavated from many graves in places such as Butuan and Surigao. They had previously been exhibited at museums.

== Filmography ==
=== Television ===
Year	Title	Role	Notes	Source
2008	Pinoy Big Brother: Teen Edition Plus	Herself ― Housemate ― 4th Big Placer		
2008	Iisa Pa Lamang	Genna		
2009	Lipgloss	Anna		
2009	Tayong Dalawa	Dolores Ocampo		
2009	Precious Hearts Romances Presents: Somewhere In My Heart	Sis. Claire		
2009	Maynila	Beauty		
2010	Your Song: Love Me, Love You		Cameo appearance	
2010–11	Precious Hearts Romances Presents: Alyna	Lisa		
2011	Mula sa Puso	Wendy		
2011–12	Angelito: Batang Ama	Ms. Sexy		
2012	Maalaala Mo Kaya	Coco		
2012	Be Careful With My Heart	Young Teresita		
2012	Angelito: Ang Bagong Yugto	Ms. Sexy		
2013	Maria Mercedes	Edna		
2013	Honesto	Emily		
2013	Wansapanataym	Arianne	Episode: "Fruitcake"	
2014	Maalaala Mo Kaya	Marilou	Episode: "Arroz Caldo"	
2014	Moon of Desire	Matilda Angela "Tilde" Comia		
2014	Ipaglaban Mo!	Carla	Episode: "Ang Totoong Ako"	
2014–15	Dream Dad	Alexandra "Alex" Sta. Maria	Main Cast / Protagonist	
2015	Nasaan Ka Nang Kailangan Kita	Teenage Ching Ching	Special Participation	
2015–16	Ningning	Lovely Angeles	Main Cast / Protagonist	
2015	Walang Iwanan	Jane Bautista	Supporting Cast / Protagonist	
2016	Ipaglaban Mo!	Vivian	Episode: "OFW"	
2017–18	Pusong Ligaw	Teresa "Tessa" Magbanua / Teri Laurel	Main Cast / Anti-Hero	
2018	Maalaala Mo Kaya	Joan	Episode: "Lason"	
2018–20	Kadenang Ginto	Romina Andrada-Mondragon	Main Cast / Anti-Hero	
2020–21	I Got You	Maria Adelina "Del" Ruiz	Main Cast	
2020–21	Paano ang Pangako?	Hope Aguinaldo	Main Cast	
2021	Stories from the Heart	Bridgette De Leon	Episode: "Loving Miss Bridgette"	
2022	I Can See You	Sheila David	Episode: "AlterNate"	
2022	The Fake Life	Cindy Villamor	Main Cast / Anti-Hero	
2022–23	Mano Po Legacy: The Flower Sisters	Violet T. Chua-Gomez	Main Cast / Anti-Hero	
2023	Magpakailanman	Diana	Episode: "Takas sa Impyerno"	
2023–25	Walang Matigas na Pulis sa Matinik na Misis	Gloria Reynaldo	Main Cast	
2023–24	Stolen Life	Farrah Dela Cruz / Lucilla "Lucy" Hidalgo-Rigor	Main Cast / Antagonist / Protagonist	
2025	Prinsesa ng City Jail	Sharlene Pascual - Cristobal	Supporting Cast	
2025	Tropang G.O.A.T	Coach Toni		
2025	Sanggang-Dikit FR	Alma	Guest Cast	
2025	Magpakailanman	Linda	Episode: "Ang Babae sa Death Row"	
2026	House of Lies	Marjorie "Marj" Castillo-Torrecampo	Main Cast / Anti-Hero	
2026	Wish Ko Lang!		Episode: "Ganti ng Ina"	
2026	Tadhana	Ericka	Episode: "Scandal ni Misis"	

=== Film ===
Year	Title	Role	Notes	Source
2008	My Only U	Marge		
2010	Sa 'yo Lamang	Rosie		
2013	Tuhog	Jenna		
2013	Bromance: My Brother’s Romance	Young Vangie		
2014	Feng Shui 2	Ellen		
2014	My Illegal Wife	Dona		
2014	Starting Over Again	Wella		
2016	The Achy Breaky Hearts	Ingrid		
2016	The Third Party	Erica		
2017	Bes and the Beshies	Sophie		
2018	Kasunduan	Gia		
2019	Billie and Emma	Amy Cagandahan		
2019	Abandoned	Simone		
2019	Hellcome Home	Cynthia Domingo		
2021	Gensan Punch	Melissa		
2023	In My Mother's Skin	Ligaya		
2023	Kampon	Eileen		
2024	Outside	Iris		
2025	The Time That Remains			

== Awards and recognitions ==
=== FHM 100 Sexiest Woman ===
Year	Award	Category	Result	Won by	Note
2014	FHM Philippines	100 Sexiest Woman	Rank # 92	Marian Rivera (3)	Appeared for August 2014 issue
2015	FHM Philippines	100 Sexiest Woman	Rank # 41	Jennylyn Mercado	

== Notes ==
Preceded by Rochelle Pangilinan	FHM Cover Girl (August 2014)	Succeeded by Diana Zubiri
