= The Third Party =

- Theatrical movie poster
- Directed by: Jason Paul Laxamana
- Screenplay by: Charlene Sawit-Esguerra!; Patrick John Valencia
- Story by: Enrico C. Santos
- Produced by: Charo Santos-Concio; Malou N. Santos
- Starring: Angel Locsin; Sam Milby; Zanjoe Marudo
- Cinematography: Dexter Dela Peña
- Edited by: Noah Tonga
- Music by: Jessie Lasaten
- Production company: ABS-CBN Film Productions
- Distributed by: Star Cinema
- Release date: October 12, 2016
- Country: Philippines
- Language: Filipino
- Box office: ₱110 million (as of November 2, 2016) (Worldwide)

The Third Party is a 2016 Filipino romantic comedy drama film starring Angel Locsin, Sam Milby and Zanjoe Marudo. It is directed by Jason Paul Laxamana from a screenplay written by Charlene Sawit-Esguerra and Patrick John Valencia.

The film was produced by ABS-CBN Film Productions and was theatrically released in Philippine cinemas on October 12, 2016, by Star Cinema.

The film marks Angel Locsin's second movie in 2016 after Everything About Her, and serves a reunion for her and Zanjoe Marudo who both starred in the 2012 film One More Try; both films were also released by Star Cinema.

== Plot ==
The story revolves between exes Andi, an events manager who aspires to be a fashion designer (portrayed by Angel) and Max, a cosmetic surgeon (portrayed by Sam) who both find ways to keep their relation intact after a breakup. But later on, Max finds new love with a gay Pediatrician, Christian (portrayed by Zanjoe). Andi gets pregnant by Íñigo (portrayed by Paolo Paraiso) who abandons her, and the trio (Andi, Max, and Christian) forms a family. The film also tackles friendship and how a person gets to know more about himself.

== Cast and characters ==
=== Main cast ===
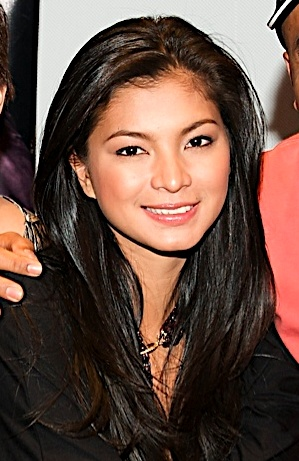
Angel Locsin portrays Andi Medina

- Angel Locsin as Andi Medina
- Sam Milby as Max Labrador
- Zanjoe Marudo as Christian Pilar

=== Supporting cast ===
- Maris Racal as Joan
- Al Tantay as Mr. Labrador
- Alma Moreno as Juliet
- Cherry Pie Picache as Carina Medina
- Beauty Gonzalez as Erica
- Matet de Leon as Lila
- Kitkat as Patient
- Carla Martinez as Mrs. Labrador
- Katrina Legaspi as Badet
- Chun Sa Jung as Laurie
- Paolo Paraiso as Iñigo
- Alora Sasam as Charlene
- Odette Khan as Tessie

== Release ==
The Third Party was theatrically released in the Philippines on October 12, 2016, by Star Cinema.

== Music ==
Baby, I Love Your Way by Morissette and Harana (originally by Peter Frampton) was released as the official soundtrack for the movie.

== Reception ==
=== Box office ===
The film grossed ₱10 million on its first day. The film has been successful nationwide and worldwide, despite its genre, giving a boost to the LGBT community. The Third Party reached the 100 Million mark in its 3rd week of showing, joining other successful films that reached 100 Million.

As of April 2019, the movie is available in the United States and elsewhere on Netflix.

== Awards ==
Award Giving Body	Recipient	Award	Result
19th Gawad PASADO Awards	Zanjoe Marudo	PinakaPASADOng Katuwang na Aktor	Won
33rd PMPC Star Awards for Movies	Zanjoe Marudo	Movie Actor of the Year	Nominated

== See also ==
- My Neighbor's Wife
- No Other Woman
- The Mistress
- A Secret Affair
- The Bride and the Lover
- Trophy Wife
- Love Me Tomorrow
- One More Try (film)
- The Mistress
