= Kimmy Dora: Kambal sa Kiyeme =

2009 film by Joyce Bernal

Kimmy Dora
- Theatrical release poster
- Directed by: Bb. Joyce Bernal
- Written by: Chris Martinez
- Produced by: Piolo Jose N. Pascual; Joyce E. Bernal; Erickson C. Raymundo; Suzanne Shayne O. Sarte
- Starring: Eugene Domingo
- Cinematography: Shayne O. Sarte
- Edited by: Vanessa Ubas de Leon
- Music by: Brian L. Cua
- Production companies: Spring Films; MJM Productions
- Distributed by: Solar Pictures; Star Cinema
- Release date: September 2, 2009
- Running time: 103 minutes
- Country: Philippines
- Language: Filipino
- Budget: ₱20 million
- Box office: ₱77.6 million

Kimmy Dora: Kambal sa Kiyeme (simply known as Kimmy Dora) is a 2009 Filipino comedy film co-produced and directed by Joyce Bernal and written by Chris Martinez, starring Eugene Domingo. It is the first installment of the Kimmy Dora film series. The film tells the story of twin sisters Kimmy and Dora, both played by Eugene Domingo. A co-production of Spring Films and MJM Productions, it was distributed to theaters nationwide on September 2, 2009 by Solar Entertainment Corporation and Star Cinema.

The film also served as the first theatrical debut for Domingo.

== Plot ==
Kimmy and Dora Go Dong Hae are identical twin daughters of wealthy businessman Luisito GoDongHae. Kimmy is a sharp, high-ranking employee in her father's company with a fiery personality, while Dora is sweet, naïve, and not very bright. On a trip, Dora adopts a stray dog named Mikky, which annoys Kimmy. When Kimmy learns that Johnson, an employee she likes, has feelings for Dora, she becomes jealous and, out of spite, abandons Mikky in a remote area. This leads to a heated argument between the sisters that turns physical, causing their father, Luisito, to suffer a heart attack.

While recovering in the hospital, Luisito decides to give Dora majority ownership of the company in his will, thinking Kimmy can manage on her own. Feeling this is unfair, Kimmy consults with her lawyer, Harris, and, in a fit of anger, unintentionally orders a contract killing on Dora while shouting at her maid to kill a cockroach.

At their father’s birthday party, Kimmy locks Dora in the bathroom and disguises herself as her twin to meet with Johnson. However, three men hired by Harris mistake Kimmy for Dora, kidnap her, and take her to the countryside.

Kimmy escapes and is taken in by a local farmer named Barry, where she bonds with him and the locals, developing feelings for Barry. Meanwhile, to keep the company running and avoid upsetting Luisito further, Johnson trains Dora to impersonate Kimmy. Although Dora struggles at first, she eventually becomes a convincing stand-in for her sister.

After a successful press conference, Luisito overhears Johnson and Dora and discovers their ruse. He alerts the police, leading to Harris's arrest. Kimmy, saying goodbye to Barry, boards a bus to return home but narrowly escapes the kidnappers once more, and they are eventually arrested by the police.

Upon discovering that Dora is impersonating her, Kimmy rushes to the company building and confronts Dora, accusing her of having her kidnapped. The argument escalates into a fight that leads them to the roof, where police arrive to arrest Kimmy but are confused by the twins wearing identical outfits. Both sisters claim to be Dora, insisting the other is Kimmy. Luisito arrives and explains Harris's misunderstanding, causing Kimmy to finally surrender.

The issue is resolved with Harris and the kidnappers going to jail. Back at the office, Luisito tells Kimmy he plans to move to the United States with Dora and expresses his appreciation for everything Kimmy has done for the company. While reflecting on her own, Kimmy finds Mikky and takes him home. She then apologizes to Dora, and the two reconcile. In the end, Dora and Luisito decide not to move after all.

== Cast ==
- Eugene Domingo as Kimmy/Dora/Charito Go Dong Hae
  - Maria Alyssa Janela Calma as Young Kimmy
  - Maria Alyssa Bianca Calma as Young Dora
- Dingdong Dantes as Johnson
- Zanjoe Marudo as Barry
- Ariel Ureta as Luisito Go Dong Hae
- Miriam Quiambao as Gertrude
- Baron Geisler as Harris
- Leo Rialp as general
- Gabby Eigenmann as kidnapper 1
- Archie Alemania as kidnapper 2
- Zeppy Borromeo as kidnapper 3
- Phillip Nolasco as Manny
- Polly Cadsawan as police officer
- Tess Antonio as employee-turned-taong grasa
- Moimoi Marcampo as Mayordoma
- Cynthia Roque as Johnson's secretary
- Ross Villamil as Mr. Flaminiano
- Moi Bien as Elena
- Mura as grandfather / herbal doctor
- John Feir as Manong Maning
- Jayson Gainza as Barry's best friend
- Mikky the dog

=== Cameos ===
Several Filipino celebrities made cameo appearances in the movie.

- Piolo Pascual
- Marvin Agustin as one of the waiters
- Christian Bautista as one of the waiters
- Mark Bautista as the Doctor
- Cristalle Belo-Henares
- Vhong Navarro as one of the waiters
- Rufa Mae Quinto as one of the waitress
- Erik Santos as one of the waiters
- Paolo Ballesteros as one of the waiters
- Jinggoy Estrada
- Aiza Seguerra as the lounge singer
- Regine Velasquez as the English teacher

== Production ==
Under director Joyce Bernal, Antoinette Jadaone served as the film's script continuity supervisor.

== Release ==
=== Box office ===
The film officially premiered on September 2, 2009 in 90 theaters around the Philippines. It became the number one movie to premiere during that week, beating out four Hollywood films and one local film.

=== Critical reception ===
Reviews for the film have been largely positive, with Butch Francisco of the Philippine Star proclaiming it as one of the more intelligent local comedy films in a long time.

Much of the critical praise has particularly been given to the performance of lead actress Eugene Domingo. Czeriza Valencia of the Philippine Entertainment Portal notes that Domingo served as the funny factor in the film, since her skillful execution in playing the two roles made the situations hilarious. Lito Zulueta of the Philippine Daily Inquirer writes that Domingo's performance "runs the gamut of comic inventiveness" and "confirms her status as the country’s funniest comic ingénue".

== Sequel ==
A sequel entitled Kimmy Dora and the Temple of Kiyeme premiered in theaters nationwide on June 13, 2012. The film was shot in South Korea.

== Prequel ==
In late 2013, it was confirmed that there would be a prequel to the first two movies of the Kimmy Dora series, to be entitled Kimmy Dora: Ang Kiyemeng Prequel. The film was an official entry to the 2013 Metro Manila Film Festival.
