= Tatlong Bibe =

2017 drama film directed by Joven Tan

- Theatrical release poster
- Directed by: Joven Tan
- Written by: Joven Tan
- Produced by: Edith Fider; Anicia Regis; Elberto Regis; Greg Serrano; Joven Tan
- Starring: Lyca Gairanod; Raikko Mateo; Marco Masa; Eddie Garcia; Dionisia Pacquiao
- Cinematography: Ian Marasigan
- Edited by: Jason Cahapay
- Music by: Paulo Zarate
- Production companies: Regis Films & Entertainment
- Distributed by: Regis Films & Entertainment
- Release date: March 1, 2017
- Country: Philippines
- Language: Filipino

Tatlong Bibe (transl. Three Little Ducklings) is a 2017 independent comedy-drama film written and directed by Joven Tan. It stars Eddie Garcia, Dionisia Pacquiao, Lyca Gairanod, Raikko Mateo and Marco Masa. It is the first ever film of Gairanod and Juan Karlos Labajo.

== Synopsis ==
A story about love and hope, and of giving, sharing, and forgiving.

== Cast ==
- Lyca Gairanod as Kimberly
- Marco Masa as Noah
- Raikko Mateo as Toto
- Dionisia Pacquiao as Caring
- Angel Aquino as Olive
- Eddie Garcia as Delfin
- Rita Avila as Viring
- Victor Neri as Amado
- Ronnie Lazaro
- Edgar Allan Guzman as Elmo
- Anita Linda as Mameng
- Sharlene San Pedro as Liberty
- Juan Karlos Labajo as James
- Adrian Alandy as Art
- Perla Bautista as Auring
- Lou Veloso as Tino
- Nikki Valdez
- Dianne Medina
- Janna Trias
- Ernie Garcia

== Release ==
The film was released theatrically on March 1, 2017, under Regis Films & Entertainment.

== Reception ==
Oggz Cruz of Rappler wrote:

Tatlong Bibe is burdened by a questionable need to tell so many stories, no matter how uncomplicated and simple they are.'

=== Accolades ===
Award ceremony	Category	Recipient	Result	Ref.
Star Awards for Movies	Movie Child Performer of the Year	Marco Masa	Won	
