= Ariel Ureta =

Filipino actor, comedian and TV Host (born 1946)

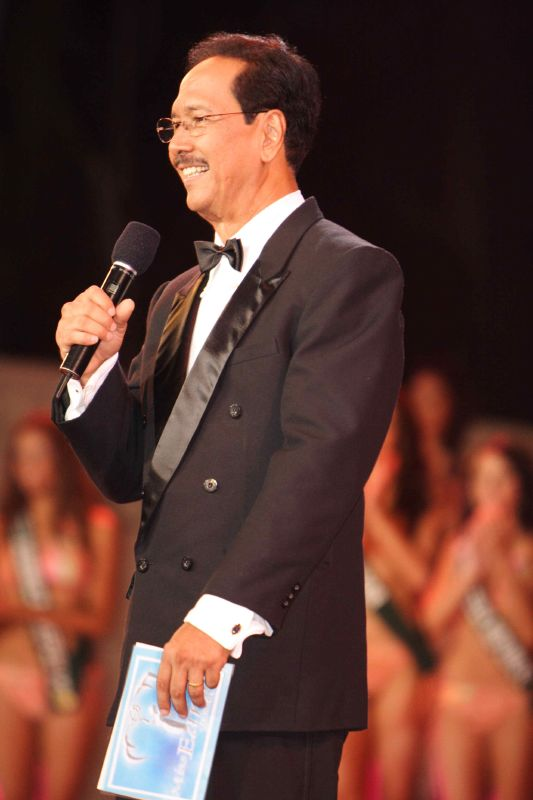
- Ureta in 2006
- Born: Juan Ariel Muñoz Ureta; November 5, 1946 (age 79); Manila, Philippines
- Education: University of Santo Tomas
- Occupations: Host, radio commentator, actor, comedian
- Years active: 1972–present
- Spouse: Boot Ureta
- Children: 4

Juan Ariel Muñoz Ureta (Tagalog: [aɾˈjɛl ʊˈrɛtɐ]; born November 5, 1946) is a Filipino comedian, actor and TV host. Ureta is a comedic icon in the Philippines during the 60's and the 70's. He has done many Filipino films. This includes Zoom Zoom Superman, Si Popeye at iba pa, Jack en Poy, Kasal, Kasali, Kasalo, Sakal, Sakali, Saklolo, Kimmy Dora and its sequel and Of All The Things.

== Career ==
=== Early years ===
Ureta's first movie was Zoom Zoom Superman a fantasy comedy movie with the former child wonder Niño Muhlach in 1973, followed by his next comedy movie, Si Popeye ATBP Movie was also released the same year. On television, he co-hosted the mid-day variety show Noontime Matinee with Tina Revilla over GMA-7 which later became, Ariel con Tina over BBC-2 (now ABS-CBN 2). He also hosted Ariel and Co after 6 in the same television network. He also hosted a variety show called Patok na Patok was formerly aired on MBS 4 (now PTV 4) from 1975 to 1977.

=== 1990s ===
He also hosted a party themed night musical variety program RSVP on the Kapuso Network GMA 7 from 1991 to 1994 with co-host Dawn Zulueta. Ureta was also a host of a short-lived comedy game program Go For It on ABC 5 (now TV5) from 1998 to 1999. He is also a former sitcom director of a comedy show Ober Da Bakod, formerly aired on GMA from 1993 to 1997.

=== 2000s to present ===
Ureta was a replacement host for Eddie Mercado on the final grand draw of Hope & More Mega Million Stakes in July 10, 2004 during the untimely hospital confinement of the latter.

Ureta is a segment host of the Philippine morning television show, Umagang Kay Ganda and a former co-anchor of DZMM's Todo-Todo Walang Preno with Winnie Cordero until August 28, 2020.

Ureta became a part of Kimmy Dora and its sequel as Luisito Go Dong Hae, Kimmy and Dora's father. The film is a box-office success in the Philippines earning PHP80 million and PHP133,963,009 for the first and second film respectively.

== Personal life ==
Ureta graduated with a degree in architecture at the University of Santo Tomas. He is married to Boot Anson (née Roa), the niece of Boots Anson-Roa and cousin of Bing Loyzaga. Together they have four children.

== Filmography ==
=== Film ===
- Zoom, Zoom, Superman! as Superman debut role (1973)
- Si Popeye, atbp as Popeye (1973)
- Jack and Poy as Jack (1977)
- Kasal, Kasali, Kasalo as Carlos (2006)
- Sakal, Sakali, Saklolo as Carlos (2007)
- Kimmy Dora: Kambal sa Kiyeme as Luisito Go Dong Hae (2009)
- Kimmy Dora and the Temple of Kiyeme as Luisito Go Dong Hae (2012)
- The Reunion as Papang (2012)
- Of All the Things as Father of Berns (2012)
- Shake, Rattle and Roll Fourteen: The Invasion as Father of Hank (Segment: Unwanted) (2012)
- The Bride and the Lover as Nestor Paredes (2013)
- Tuhog as Dr. Nuguid (2013)
- Kimmy Dora: Ang Kiyemeng Prequel as Luisito Go Dong Hae (2013)
- Rewind as Hermie (2023)

=== Television ===
- 12 O'Clock High (1972) - Host
- Two For The Road (1972; GMA Network 1973–1975)
- Ariel Con Tina (1972–1974) - Host
- Ariel and Co. After Six (1974–1978) - Host
- Patok Na Patok (1975–1977)
- Vilma On 7 (1991) - Co-host
- RSVP (1993–1995) - Host
- Ober Da Bakod (1993–1996) - TV director
- Go for It! (1998–1999) - Host
- Maynila (1999) - Various Roles
- Miss Earth (2003, 2005 and 2006) - Host
- Hope and More Mega Million Stakes (2004) - Host during the untimely health conditions of Eddie Mercado
- My Favorite Show (2006) - Host
- Umagang Kay Ganda (2012–2020) - Host
- Dream Dad (2015) - supporting role
- Sana Dalawa ang Puso (2018) - special participation
- Oh My Dad! (TV5, 2020–2021) - Lolo Moises Balderama
- FPJ's Ang Probinsyano (2021) - Prof. Henry Sarmiento
- Luv Is: Caught in His Arms (2023) - Don Garpido Ferell

=== TV director ===
- Ober Da Bakod (1992–1996)

== Radio ==
- Todo-Todo Walang Preno (2004–2020)

== Awards ==
- Winner, Ading Fernando Lifetime TV Achievement Award, 37th PMPC Star Awards For TV 2025
- Winner, Best Morning Show Hosts UKG Barkadas - 2012–2017 PMPC Star Awards For TV
- Winner, Best Male TV Host RSVP - 1992 PMPC Star Awards For TV

Preceded by Marc Nelson	Miss Earth host 2003	Succeeded by Marc Nelson
Preceded by Marc Nelson	Miss Earth host 2005–2006	Succeeded by Utt Panichkul
