= Dream Dad =

2014–15 Philippine television drama series

- Title card
- Genre: Comedy drama; Family drama
- Created by: ABS-CBN Studios; Mel Mendoza-Del Rosario
- Developed by: ABS-CBN Studios
- Written by: Arlene Tamayo; Zoilo Barrel; Julius Villanueva; Cyrus Dan Cañares; June Anthony Amarillo
- Directed by: Jeffrey R. Jeturian; Chris Alan Chanliongco
- Creative directors: Brian Hagens; Carson Brooks
- Starring: Zanjoe Marudo; Jana Agoncillo; Beauty Gonzalez
- Opening theme: "I Never Leave You Alone" by Karla Cruz
- Composer: Vincent de Jesus
- Country of origin: Philippines
- Original language: Filipino
- No. of episodes: 103

Production
- Executive producers: Carlo Katigbak; Cory Vidanes; Laurenti Dyogi; Ginny Monteagudo-Ocampo
- Producers: Ellen Nicolas-Criste; Grace Ann Bodegon-Casimsima; Aimee Fabian Sumalde
- Production locations: Metro Manila, Philippines; San Pedro, Laguna; Batangas
- Editors: Dennis Salgado; Joy Buenaventura
- Running time: 30–36 minutes
- Production company: GMO Entertainment Unit

Original release
- Network: ABS-CBN
- Release: November 24, 2014 – April 17, 2015

Related
- Magandang Buhay (inspired by the series tagline)

Dream Dad is a Philippine television drama comedy series broadcast by ABS-CBN. Directed by Jeffrey R. Jeturian and Chris Alan Chanliongco, it stars Jana Agoncillo, Zanjoe Marudo and Beauty Gonzalez. It aired on the network's Primetime Bida line up and worldwide on TFC from November 24, 2014 to April 17, 2015, replacing Hawak Kamay and was replaced by Nathaniel.

== Plot ==
The story centers on Sebastian "Baste" Javier (Zanjoe Marudo), a kind-hearted veterinarian from Batangas, who chose to succeed his father Eliseo (Ariel Ureta) as the president of ENS Dairy Corporation, in order to preserve his parents' strained relationship.

With the help of his trusted friend, Michael (Ketchup Eusebio), and his devoted executive assistant, Alex (Beauty Gonzalez), Baste transforms himself from a boardroom neophyte into a successful businessman. But it was a decision that came with a cost - his lover Angel (Neri Naig).

Left with a broken heart, Baste meets Baby (Jana Cassandra Agoncillo) - a wide-eyed orphan girl who believes that he is her long-lost father. The two are forced to work together when Baby suddenly bags the much coveted role of becoming the new face of Wink Milk, the flagship product of Baste's company.

As they spend more time with each other, Baby begins to see through Baste's pain and, in him, the father she longed for all her life. Even with the knowledge that Baste is indeed not her biological father, Baby chooses to help him piece his heart back together. And in the process, Baste learns to trust and gambles on love once again. Eventually, Baste and his assistant Alex fell in love with each other and even planned for a wedding.

Consequently, the two bond in an unlikely love story between a bachelor relearning to love the simple joys in life and a young kid whose spirit does not know how to stop loving. In the series, Baste was able to get custody as an adoptive parent of Baby. This happened despite the presence of Baby's biological mother, Bebeth (Yen Santos).

In the end, Baste realizes that behind every great man, and every great father – may it be by blood, or otherwise – is a family that never fails to support him despite all his shortcomings.

== Cast and characters ==
=== Main cast ===
- Zanjoe Marudo as President Sebastian "Baste" V. Javier
- Jana Agoncillo as Baby Sabina Sta. Maria Javier
- Beauty Gonzalez as Alexandra "Alex" Sta. Maria-Javier

=== Supporting cast ===
- Maxene Magalona as April Mae Pamintuan
- Gloria Diaz as Nenita Viray-Javier
- Ariel Ureta as Eliseo Javier
- Ketchup Eusebio as Michael Castro
- Katya Santos as Precious San Juan-Castro
- Yen Santos as Maribeth "Bebeth" Morales
- Matt Evans as Paul Monteliano
- Ces Quesada as Carmen Castro
- Dante Ponce as Julio Pamintuan
- Atoy Co as Miguel Castro
- Jonicka Cyleen Movido as Rain
- John Steven de Guzman as Tikboy
- Viveika Ravanes as Corina "Coring" Isidro
- Ces Aldaba as Mang David
- Ana Feleo as Aleli Panganiban
- Rez Cortez as Enrique Sta. Maria
- Bryan Termulo as Kenneth Sta. Maria
- Teejay Marquez as Jake Sta. Maria
- Paulo Angeles as Manuel Castro
- Joma Labayen as Amado
- Guji Lorenzana as Francis
- Pamu Pamorada as Lilet

=== Guest cast ===
- Neri Naig as Angel San Jose
- Raikko Mateo as young Sebastian "Baste" Javier
- Carlo Aquino as young Eliseo Javier
- Anna Luna as young Nenita Viray-Javier
- Sue Ramirez as young Carmen Castro
- Paul Jake Castillo as young Miguel Castro
- Kiray Celis as Gracia Anna (TV character)
- Michelle Vito as Señorita Glenda (TV character)
- Christopher Roxas
- Via Veloso
- Jacob Benedicto as Jaymart
- Arlene Muhlach as Stella
- Mikee Villanueva as Javier family's attorney

== Production ==
The initial premiere of Dream Dad was originally On November 17, 2014 at 5:45 P.M., replacing Pure Love. However, due to its popularity, last minute decision and unexpectedly selection of Bagito — the known network's teen drama series — as a later's replacement, the air date was later moved to November 24, 2014 at 7:30 P.M., replacing Hawak Kamay.

== Re-runs ==
The show began airing re-runs on Jeepney TV from September 5, 2016 to January 20, 2017 (replacing the re-runs of Maging Sino Ka Man: Ang Pagbabalik); August 26 to November 1, 2019 (replacing the re-runs of Be My Lady); November 21, 2020 to July 10, 2021 (replacing the re-runs of Starla); January 16 to March 31, 2023 (replacing the re-runs of Ikaw ay Pag-Ibig); and August 24, 2026 to January 15, 2027 (replacing the re-runs of Dyosa).

== Trivia ==
- This is the first project of Magalona in her comeback. Also this is the very first teleserye of Teejay Marquez here on ABS-CBN.
- The Philippine morning television talk show broadcast, Magandang Buhay title is inspired by a popular tagline in Dream Dad, "Magandang Buhay".

== Reception ==
KANTAR MEDIA NATIONAL TV RATINGS (5:45PM and 7:45PM PST)
| PILOT EPISODE | FINALE EPISODE | PEAK | AVERAGE | SOURCE |
|---|---|---|---|---|
| 29.0% | 32.9% | 34.9% | 20.3% | |

== Awards ==
2015 11th USTV Awards: Year's choice of drama program

== See also ==
- List of programs broadcast by ABS-CBN
- List of ABS-CBN Studios original drama series
- List of programs broadcast by Jeepney TV
