= Kimmy Dora: Ang Kiyemeng Prequel =

2013 film by Chris Martinez

- Theatrical release poster
- Directed by: Joyce Bernal; Chris Martinez
- Written by: Chris Martinez
- Produced by: Joyce Bernal; Erickson Raymundo; Suzanne Shayne Sarte; Piolo Jose Pascual
- Starring: Eugene Domingo; Sam Milby
- Cinematography: Gary Gardoce
- Edited by: Claire Villa-Real
- Music by: Vincent de Jesus
- Production companies: Spring Films; MJM Productions; Unitel Pictures; Quantum Films
- Distributed by: Spring Films
- Release date: December 25, 2013
- Running time: 97 minutes
- Country: Philippines
- Language: Filipino

Kimmy Dora: Ang Kiyemeng Prequel is a 2013 Filipino action comedy film, directed by Chris Martinez, starring Eugene Domingo and Sam Milby. It is the prequel and third and final installment of the Kimmy Dora film series. This film is one of the official entries of the 2013 Metro Manila Film Festival, that will be distributed by Spring Films with co-production of MJM Productions and Quantum Films, that was released in theaters on the last Christmas Day (December 25, 2013).

The film is set before the events of Kimmy Dora: Kambal sa Kiyeme wherein the twins are seen disputing the ownership of the family corporation.

It was inspired by the James Bond film series, in terms of musical score and visual effects.

Piolo Pascual was reportedly the leading man of Domingo in the film but was replaced by Sam Milby due to a busy schedule.

== Plot ==
Kimmy (Eugene Domingo), graduates summa cum laude from a posh school abroad. She expects to take over her family's business empire, but is disappointed when she's asked to start working at the bottom of the company first.

Kimmy must also compete with Dora (Eugene Domingo), who just wants to jumpstart her budding acting career. Dora might not want to work for the family business, yet she plays along because she has a major crush on their internship supervisor, Rodin (Sam Milby).

While all these are happening, a mysterious entity named Bogart is out to sabotage their business empire. Will Kimmy and Dora be able to save the company from Bogart? Who gets to head the family business? Who will win Rodin's affections?

== Cast ==
=== Main cast ===
- Eugene Domingo as Kimmy/Dora GoDongHae
- Sam Milby as Rodin Bartoletti

=== Supporting cast ===
- Ariel Ureta as Luisito GoDongHae
- Miriam Quiambao as Gertrude
- Moi Bien as Elena
- Mura as Lolo/Herbal Doctor
- Joel Torre as Curtis
- Angel Aquino as Bridget/Bogart

=== Cameo ===
- Paulo Avelino as Elevator passenger
- Sam Concepcion as Hae Hae Restaurant customer
- Tippy Dos Santos as Hae Hae Restaurant customer
- Mylene Dizon as Parking customer
- Zanjoe Marudo as Barry
- Dingdong Dantes as Johnson
- Piolo Pascual as Buko Vendor
- Cai Cortez as Shop customer
- Tess Antonio as Employee
- John Lapus as Poor/Beggar

=== Extras ===
- Marc Conrad Vito as Shop customer kid
- Jean Weigmann as Shop customer
- Rhae Lermadosa as Guest
