= Doseonsa =

Buddhist temple in Seoul, South Korea

Coordinates: 37°39′19″N 126°59′23″E

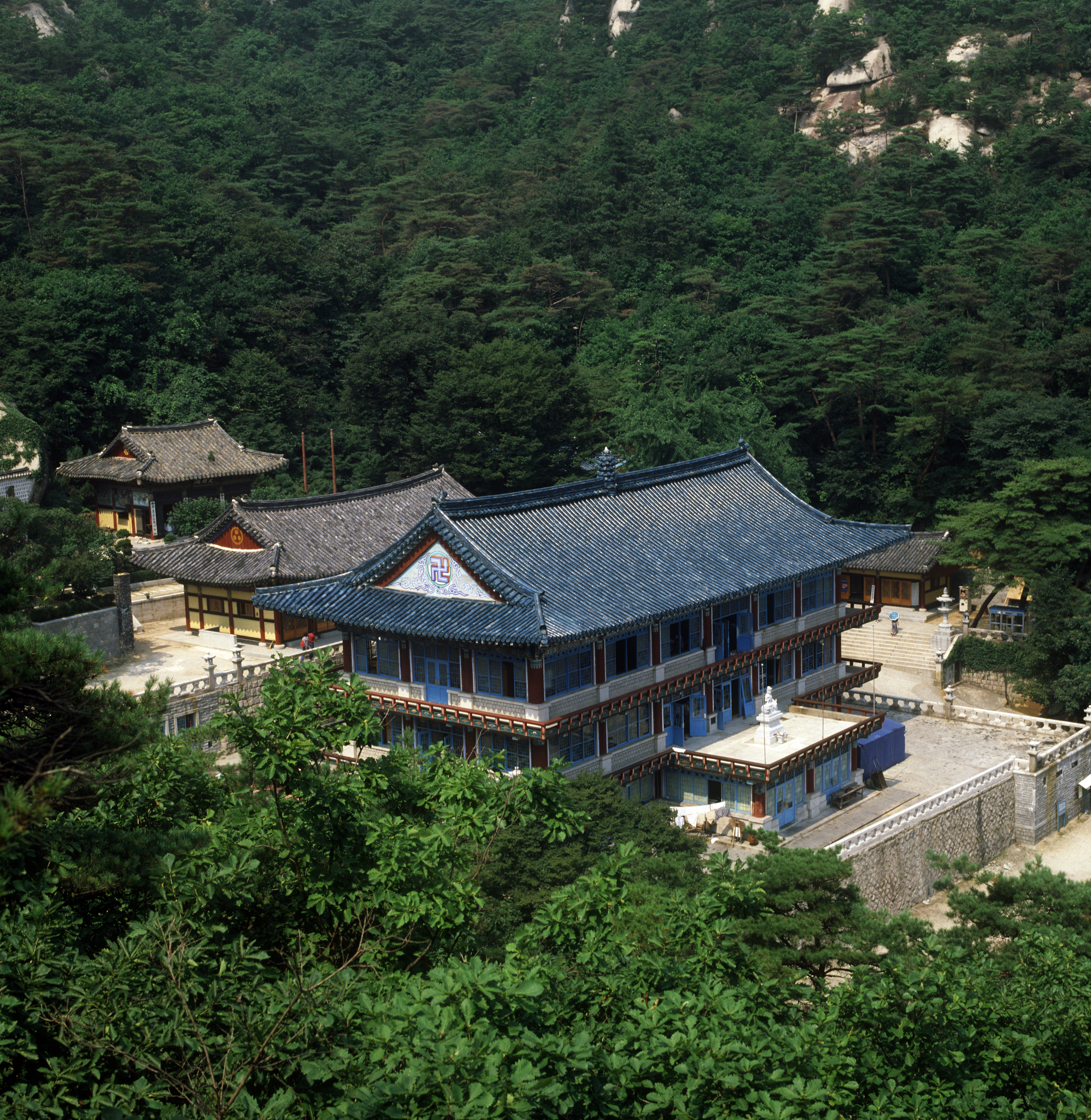
- The temple (before 1988)

Religion
- Affiliation: Jogye Order
- Interactive map of Doseonsa

Korean name
- Hangul: 도선사
- Hanja: 道詵寺
- RR: Doseonsa
- MR: Tosŏnsa

Doseonsa (Korean: 도선사) is a Buddhist temple of the Jogye Order in Seoul, South Korea, named after its supposed founder, Doseon. It is located at 264 Ui-dong, in the Gangbuk District area of the city and is the largest temple complex on Bukhansan, the most prominent mountain north of Seoul. The temple was dedicated in 862, though none of its original structures survive.

== See also ==
- List of Buddhist temples in Seoul
