= Zanjoe Marudo =

Filipino actor and model (born 1982)

- Born: Zanjoe Acuesta Marudo; July 23, 1982 (age 43); Tanauan, Batangas, Philippines
- Occupations: Actor, model
- Years active: 2006–present
- Agent: Star Magic (2006–present)
- Height: 1.85 m (6 ft 1 in)
- Spouse: Ria Atayde (m. 2024)
- Children: 1
- Relatives: Art Atayde (father-in-law); Sylvia Sanchez (mother-in-law); Arjo Atayde (brother-in-law)

Zanjoe Acuesta Marudo (Tagalog: [ˈsandʒɔ mɐˈrudɔ]; born July 23, 1982) is a Filipino actor and model. He began his career after finishing as the 4th Big Placer of Pinoy Big Brother: Celebrity Edition 1 (2006). Since then he has starred in the TV series' Lovers in Paris (2009), Precious Hearts Romances Presents: Kristine (2010), Annaliza (2013), Dream Dad (2014), Tubig at Langis (2016) and My Dear Heart (2017).

Aside from his roles in television he is also known for his roles in films such as You Got Me! (2007), Kimmy Dora: Kambal sa Kiyeme (2009), Kimmy Dora and the Temple of Kiyeme (2012), One More Try (2012), Bromance: My Brother's Romance (2013), Maria Leonora Teresa (2014) and The Third Party (2016).

Marudo is a contract artist of ABS-CBN's Star Magic.

== Early life ==
Zanjoe Acuesta Marudo was born on July 23, 1982 in Tanauan, Batangas. His father, Zósimo Lumbres Marudo hails from Batangas while his mother, Rosanna Acuesta, is a native of Calauag, Quezon. He is the third of their six children.

From elementary school until high school, he played in the basketball varsity team under the influence of his brother Zandro. He was with the San Sebastian College Staglets, playing in the NCAA.

== Career ==
Marudo joined a modeling contest, Body Shots, and won the first runner-up title. He joined Pinoy Big Brother: Celebrity Edition, coming in fourth place behind the likes of John Prats, Bianca Gonzalez and Keana Reeves. He then signed his acting contract with ABS-CBN.

Marudo became a model after high school. He appeared in the Bench Fever fashion show. In Philippine Cosmopolitan Magazine (September 2006 issue), Marudo was one of the 10 centerfold men in the "Cosmopolitan 69 Bachelors and 10 Centerfolds" supplement.

Marudo was with the ABS-CBN comedy series Aalog-Alog (Jiggling) with Pinoy Big Brother: Celebrity Edition housemates John Prats, Keanna Reeves, and Pinoy Big Brother runner-up Jason Gainza and in the fantasy series Super Inggo as Super Islaw. He was seen in Florinda with Maricel Soriano.

In January 2011 (after the Christmas and New Year holidays), Marudo announced his departure from Bench following his decision not to renew his contract due to busy commitments.

Marudo entered politics in 2024 when he decided to run as the second nominee of ASAP NA party-list for the 2025 elections. However, ASAP NA failed to secure a seat after losing the elections.

== Filmography ==
=== Film ===
Year	Title	Role
2007	You Got Me!	Caloy
2008	Altar	Anton
2009	Kimmy Dora: Kambal sa Kiyeme	Barry
2010	Cinco	Elvis
2010	Sa 'yo Lamang	John
2011	Wedding Tayo, Wedding Hindi	Oca Baytion
2011	Shake, Rattle & Roll 13	Allan
2012	Kimmy Dora and the Temple of Kiyeme	Barry
2012	Wildlife	Lucio
2012	24/7 in Love	Butch Vinzon
2012	One More Try	Tristan
2013	Death March	Alex
2013	Bromance: My Brother's Romance	Brando / Brandy
2013	Rematado	Marco
2013	Kimmy Dora: Ang Kiyemeng Prequel	Barry
2014	My Illegal Wife	Henry James Acuesta
2014	Maria Leonora Teresa	Julio B. Sacdalan
2016	The Third Party	Christian Pilar
2017	Can't Help Falling In Love	Mayor Luis Villarin
2017	Fallback	Alvin
2018	Kusina Kings	Ronnie
2018	To Love Some Buddy	Julius
2020	Malaya	Iago
2020	Isa Pang Bahaghari	Andrew "Andy" Sanchez
2022	366	Marco
2022	Ikaw Lang ang Mahal	Andrei
2023	Keys to the Heart	Joma Mercado
2025	How To Get Away From My Toxic Family	Arsenio
2025	Habang Nilalamon ng Hydra ang Kasaysayan	David
2025	Unmarry	Ivan
2026	Nang Mapagod si Kamatayan	

=== Television ===
Year	Title	Role
2006	Pinoy Big Brother: Celebrity Edition	Himself/4th Celebrity Big Placer
2006	Maalaala Mo Kaya: Love Letters	Julio
2006	Aalog-Alog	Banjoe Rosales
2006	Love Spell Presents: Wanted Mr. Perfect	Franco
2006	Super Inggo	Super Islaw
2006	Komiks: Fun Haus	
2006	Komiks: Alpha Omega Girl	Armand/Arm
2006	Star Magic Presents: The Sweetest Victory	Robert
2006	Star Magic Presents: Sabihin Mo Lang	Max
2006	Your Song: Nasaan Ka?	Alas
2006	Your Song: Kasi Naman	Paolo
2006	Maalaala Mo Kaya: Bisekleta	Danilo
2006–present	ASAP	Himself
2007	Maalaala Mo Kaya: Jacket	Mark
2007	Maalaala Mo Kaya: Barko	Mio
2007	Love Spell Presents: Barbi-Cute	Luke
2007	Kokey	Abie
2007	Super Inggo 1.5: Ang Bagong Bangis	Super Islaw
2008	Maalaala Mo Kaya: Bus	Louie
2008	I Am KC Presents: Time's Up	Francis/Kato
2008	Dyosa	Mars
2008	Komiks Presents: Mars Ravelo's Varga	James
2009	Parekoy	Mario
2009	Banana Split	Himself
2009	The Wedding	Marlon Mañalac
2009	Sineserye Presents: Florinda	Archie
2009	Lovers in Paris	Martin Barrameda
2010	Maalaala Mo Kaya: Bag	Eric
2010	Precious Hearts Romances Presents: Love Is Only in the Movies	Xander
2010	Precious Hearts Romances Presents: Kristine	Jaime Reyes / Bernard De Silva–Fortalejo
2010	Mara Clara	Himself/Guest role
2011	Maalaala Mo Kaya: Kuliglig	Manny
2011	Your Song: Kim	Aldo
2011	Maalaala Mo Kaya: Kwintas	Zandro
2011–2015	Banana Split	Himself
2012	It's Showtime	Himself/Guest judge
2012	Maalaala Mo Kaya: Cross-stitch	Egay
2012	Precious Hearts Romances Presents: Hiyas	Silang
2012	Maalaala Mo Kaya: Relo	Sherwin
2013–2014	Annaliza	Gideon "Guido" Querubin
2014–2015	Dream Dad	Sebastian "Baste" Javier
2016	Tubig at Langis	Renato "Natoy" Villadolid
2016	Maalaala Mo Kaya: Kweba	Juan
2016	Maalaala Mo Kaya: Anino	Victor
2017	My Dear Heart	Jude De Jesus
2018	Maalaala Mo Kaya: Tangke	Rommel Sandoval
2018–2019	Playhouse	Marlon Ilaban
2019	Maalaala Mo Kaya: Balsa	Ryan Homan
2020	My Single Lady	BG
2020–2021	Walang Hanggang Paalam	Antonio "Anton" Hernandez
2022	The Broken Marriage Vow	David Ilustre
2023	Dirty Linen	Aidan Roque-Fiero
2026	The Silent Noise	Anton Carpio
2026	Sigabo	young Rudy Magtibay

== Awards and nominations ==
Year	Award-Giving Body	Category	Work/Award	Result
2008	24th PMPC Star Awards for Movies	New Movie Actor of the Year	You Got Me!	Nominated
2008	5th Golden Screen Awards	Breakthrough Actor of the Year	Altar	Nominated
2011	9th Gawad Tanglaw for Television	Best Single Performance by an Actor	Maalaala Mo Kaya: Kuliglig	Won
2012	38th Metro Manila Film Festival	Best Supporting Actor	One More Try	Nominated
2012	38th Metro Manila Film Festival	Male Celebrity of the Night	One More Try	Won
2013	61st FAMAS Awards	Best Supporting Actor	One More Try	Nominated
2013	29th PMPC Star Awards for Movies	Movie Supporting Actor of the Year	One More Try	Nominated
2013	31st Film Academy of the Philippines Luna Awards	Best Supporting Actor	One More Try	Nominated
2017	19th Gawad PASADO Awards	PinakaPASADOng Katuwang na Aktor	The Third Party	Won
2017	33rd PMPC Star Awards for Movies	Movie Actor of the Year	The Third Party	Nominated
2017	45th International Emmy Awards	Best Performance by an Actor	Maalaala Mo Kaya: Anino	Nominated
2020	44th Gawad Urian	Best Actor (Pinakamahusay na Pangunahing Aktor)	Malaya	Nominated
2020	46th Metro Manila Film Festival	Best Supporting Actor	Isa Pang Bahaghari	Nominated
2025	51st Metro Manila Film Festival	Best Actor	Unmarry	Nominated

== Personal life ==
Marudo and actress Ria Atayde officially confirmed their engagement on February 20, 2024, in a joint Instagram post. On March 23, 2024, the couple were married in a civil ceremony in Quezon City officiated by Mayor Joy Belmonte. Their child was born on September 23, 2024.
