= Honesto =

2013–14 Philippine television drama series

- Title card
- Genre: Family drama, Comedy, Fantasy
- Created by: ABS-CBN Studios; Rondel P. Lindayag
- Developed by: ABS-CBN Studios; Roldeo T. Endrinal; Julie Anne R. Benitez
- Written by: Rondel P. Lindayag; Arlene Tamayo
- Directed by: Jerry Lopez Sineneng; Darnel Joy R. Villaflor; Claudio "Tots" Sanchez-Mariscal IV
- Starring: Raikko Mateo; Paulo Avelino
- Opening theme: "Pananagutan" by Gary Valenciano
- Composers: Fr. Eduardo Hontiveros, SJ; Manuel Francisco, SJ
- Country of origin: Philippines
- Original language: Filipino
- No. of episodes: 100

Production
- Executive producers: Roldeo T. Endrinal; Hazel B. Parfan; Maya Manuel Aralar
- Production location: Philippines
- Editor: Froilan Francia
- Running time: 30–45 minutes
- Production company: Dreamscape Entertainment Television

Original release
- Network: ABS-CBN
- Release: October 28, 2013 – March 14, 2014

Honesto is a Philippine television drama series broadcast by ABS-CBN. Directed by Jerry Lopez Sineneng, Darnel Joy R. Villaflor and Claudio "Tots" Sanchez-Mariscal IV, it stars Raikko Mateo and Paulo Avelino. It aired on the network's Primetime Bida line up and worldwide on TFC from October 28, 2013, to March 14, 2014, replacing Juan dela Cruz and was replaced by Mars Ravelo's Dyesebel. It is based on the 1940 Walt Disney Productions film Pinocchio.

== Production ==
The production of the series started early September 2008, under the name Utoy. Dolphy said in an interview with ABS-CBN that he had a hard time working on scenes with animation. Dolphy, Makisig Morales, Kathryn Bernardo, Jake Vargas, Eddie Gutierrez, Liza Lorena, Gloria Diaz, Ethel Booba, Tanya Garcia, Izza Ignacio, Jon Avila, Victor Basa, Sheryn Regis, Melissa Ricks, Eda Nolan, Charee Pineda, Jayson Gainza, Will Devaughn, Ryan Eigenmann, James Blanco, and Rainier Castillo would be played as Papa Yoyo, Utoy, Abby, Christian, Luis, Manilyn, Diana Rose, Fairy Alipia, Tinkerbell, Jocelyn, Ricky, Robin, Fairy Fantasia, Emerald, Celine, Cheska, Bernie, Rico, Wilmar, Dino, and Exekiel respectively. Dolphy later confirmed to PEP.com the news that Utoy was shelved, after he moved to TV5. Dolphy would later pass away in 2012 at the age of 83.

Following Dolphy's death and five years after it stalled production, the name was changed to Honesto with entirely different casts.

== Cast and characters ==
=== Main cast ===
- Raikko Mateo as Honesto Galang / Honesto L. Layer
- Paulo Avelino as Diego Layer

=== Supporting cast ===
- Eddie Garcia as Lemuel Galang
- Janice de Belen as Lourdes Galang
- Joel Torre as Hugo Layer
- Angel Aquino as Magdalena "Lena" Layer†
- Nonie Buencamino as Cleto
- Cristine Reyes as Nurse Marie Olivarez
- Melissa Ricks as Leah Layer
- Joseph Marco as Elijah "Elai" Galang

=== Recurring cast ===
- Jason Francisco as Omar Batungbakal
- Melai Cantiveros as Cleopatra Batungbakal
- Malou Crisologo as Minerva
- Jana Agoncillo as Abby Layer
- Allan Paule as Rolando "Rolly" Jimenez
- Josh Ivan Morales as Conrad
- Michael Conan as Joel
- Marco Masa as Wacky
- Jan Marini as Rebecca
- Biboy Ramirez as Willy
- Bing Davao as Dr. Perez
- Nanding Josef as Fr. Anton
- Erin Ocampo as Alexa
- Eileen Gonzales as Irene

=== Guest cast ===
- Kathleen Hermosa as Inna
- Lui Villaruz as Pablo
- Beauty Gonzalez as Emily
- Johan Santos as Jacob
- Hermie Concepcion as Lidia
- Kristoffer Calderon as Aaron
- Charls Deomampo as Chubby
- Ricardo Cepeda as Anuncio
- Helga Krapf as Fiona
- Vangie Martelle as Natasha
- William Lorenzo as Ricky
- Gio Alvarez as Benjie
- Meryll Soriano as Elsa
- Larah Claire Sabroso as Rose
- Ron Morales as Gerald Pascual
- Melissa Mendez Mrs. Pascual
- Shey Bustamante as Grace Pascual
- JV Kapunan as Greg Pascual
- Jobelle Salvador
- Dianne Medina as Tanya
- Allyson McBride as Christine
- CX Navarro

=== Special participation ===
- Gina Pareño as Rosita Layer†
- Spanky Manikan as Felipe Lualhati
- Maricar Reyes as Josefina "Fina" Lualhati†
- Carl John Barrameda as young Diego
- Alexa Ilacad as Young Marie

=== Notes ===
- Angel Aquino exits Honesto so that she could join the cast of Ikaw Lamang as Rebecca Miravelez.
- There are many characters in Honesto that are in Ikaw Lamang, like: Angel Aquino, Joel Torre, Nonie Buencamino, Jana Agoncillo and Spanky Manikan.
- Maricar Reyes and Paulo Avelino reunited in Sana Bukas Pa ang Kahapon.

== Reception ==
Based on the data from Kantar Media, the pilot episode of Honesto garnered 30.5% national TV ratings compared to its rival program Genesis of GMA Network which only scored 10.5%.

KANTAR MEDIA NATIONAL TV RATINGS (7:45PM PST)
PILOT EPISODE	FINALE EPISODE	PEAK	AVERAGE	SOURCE
30.5%	35.4%	35.1%	TBA	

== Awards ==
Year	Award-Giving Body	Category	Recipient	Result
2014	GMMSF Box-Office Entertainment Awards	Most Popular Male Child Performer	Raikko Mateo	Won
2014	Anak TV Seal Awards	Most Admired Male Personality In Philippine TV	Paulo Avelino	Won

== See also ==
- List of programs broadcast by ABS-CBN
- List of ABS-CBN Studios original drama series
