= Raikko Mateo =

Filipino child actor

- Born: Raikko Rain Mateo Gongora; July 31, 2008 (age 18); San Marcelino, Zambales, Philippines
- Occupations: Actor, endorser
- Years active: 2013–present
- Agent: Star Magic (2013–present)
- Known for: Honesto; Goin' Bulilit
- Notable work: Honesto

Raikko Rain Mateo Gongora (born July 31, 2008), is a Filipino actor who gained popularity as the lead star of the fantasy-drama Honesto and mainstay cast of comedy gag show Goin' Bulilit.

== Filmography ==
=== Film ===
| Year | Title | Role |
|---|---|---|
| 2014 | Feng Shui 2 | Mio |
| 2015 | Resureksyon | Migs |
| 2015 | Beauty and the Bestie | Angelo |
| 2017 | Northern Lights: A Journey to Love | Charlie Jr. |
| 2017 | Woke Up Like This | Jolly |
| 2022 | Yorme: The Isko Domagoso Story | young Scott/Isko/Yorme |

=== Television ===
| Year | Title | Role |
|---|---|---|
| 2013 | Wansapanataym: Moomoo Knows Best | Roi |
| 2013–present | ASAP | Himself / Performer |
| 2013–2014 | Honesto | Honesto Galang |
| 2014–2019 | Goin' Bulilit | Himself |
| 2014 | Goin' Bulilit: Panahon ng Hapon | Jose |
| 2014 | Wansapanataym: My Guardian Angel | Kiko |
| 2014 | Ipaglaban Mo: Ako ang Iyong Ina | Luis |
| 2014 | Hawak-Kamay | Gin's guardian angel |
| 2014 | Dream Dad | young Sebastian "Baste" Javier |
| 2014 | Maalaala Mo Kaya: Bukid | JP |
| 2015 | Pasión de Amor | young Oscar Samonte |
| 2015 | FPJ's Ang Probinsyano | Alvin |
| 2015 | Walang Iwanan | Michael |
| 2015 | You're My Home | young Vince Fontanilla / Kennedy "Ken" Cabanero |
| 2015 | Maalaala Mo Kaya: Class Picture | young Bert |
| 2016 | Maalaala Mo Kaya: Pasa | young Rommel |
| 2016 | Wansapanataym: Just Got Laki | Macky |
| 2016 | The Greatest Love | young Paeng |
| 2017 | Ipaglaban Mo: Sinapupunan | Mon-mon Roxas |
| 2017 | Maalaala Mo Kaya: Baso | young Jayson |
| 2018 | Bagani | young Lakam |
| 2019 | Maalaala Mo Kaya: Family Portrait | young Edong |
| 2019 | Ipaglaban Mo: Gayuma | William |
| 2019 | Maalaala Mo Kaya: Family Portrait | young Ryan |
| 2019 | Ipaglaban Mo: Disiplina | Jeremy Rosario |
| 2019 | Starla | Astro |
| 2019–2020 | Pamilya Ko | John Paul "Ponky" Mabunga |
| 2023 | E.A.T. - TVJ | Himself |
| 2023 | Tao Po! | Himself |
| 2026 | Rainbow Rumble | Himself / Contestant |
| 2026 | The Loyalty Game | young Ben |

== Awards and nominations ==
| Year | Awards | Nominated for | Result |
|---|---|---|---|
| 2014 | 28th PMPC Star Awards for TV | Best Child Performer (Honesto) | Won |
| 2014 | Yahoo! Celebrity Awards 2014 | Child Star of the Year | Nominated |
| 2014 | 45th Guillermo Mendoza Box Office Entertainment Awards | Most Popular Male Child Performer (Honesto) | Won |
| 2014 | 16th Gawad PASADO Awards | Most Passing Symbol in a Moral Conduct | Won |
