= Mang Kepweng Returns =

2017 Filipino fantasy comedy horror film

- Theatrical release poster
- Directed by: GB Sam Pedro
- Written by: Volta delos Santos
- Based on: Mang Kepweng (1979)
- Produced by: Enrico A. Roque; Vic Del Rosario Jr.
- Starring: Vhong Navarro
- Production companies: Cineko Productions; Viva Films
- Distributed by: Viva Films (2017-2020) GMA Pictures (2021-present)
- Release date: January 4, 2017
- Running time: 120 minutes
- Country: Philippines
- Language: Filipino

Mang Kepweng Returns is a 2017 Filipino fantasy comedy horror film. The film is directed by Giuseppe Bede Sampedro and is under the production of Cineko Productions in association with Viva Films. The current distributor of the film is GMA Pictures.

The film is a remake of the 1979 film Mang Kepweng where the titular protagonist, a funny albularyo, was portrayed by comedian Chiquito.

It was released in Philippine cinemas on January 4, 2017, exactly the same day of Vhong Navarro's birthday.

== Synopsis ==
The story revolves around Kiefer (Vhong Navarro), a normal guy who lives a quiet life until he goes through bizarre experiences, seeing ghosts and evil spirits. With this, his mother Milagros (Jacklyn Jose) is forced to tell him the truth that he is Mang Kepweng's son.

With Kiefer's determination to know more about his roots and how he is connected to the paranormal occurrences he is experiencing, he travels to the provinces meeting his half-brother Zach (James Blanco), a successful doctor who cannot cure his wife's Via (Sunshine Cruz) mysterious illness.

Zach later revealed that their late father Mang Kepweng (Chiquito) left a scarf which gives a healing power to whoever wears it. With Zach's desire to cure his wife, he tried it but it didn’t work which turns out that Kiefer is the chosen one who can heal using the magical scarf and this signals a new road for Kiefer, as the new Mang Kepweng this time.

== Cast ==
=== Main cast ===
- Vhong Navarro as Kiefer Rivera/Mang Kepweng
- Kim Domingo as Alyssa

=== Supporting cast ===
- Cristian Caingin as Estong Eskaryote
- Jaclyn Jose as Milagros Rivera, Kiefer's mother
- James Blanco as Dr. Zacharias Rivera, Kiefer's half-brother
- Sunshine Cruz as Via Rivera, Zach's wife and Kiefer's sister-in-law
- Juancho Trivino as Boy Pogi
- Balang as Mac, Kiefer's adopted nephew
- Chunsa Jung as Bea, Kiefer's adopted niece
- Jobert Austria as Shugo
- Alex Calleja as Gabe
- Xia Vigor as Menggay, Nora's Daughter
- Josh de Guzman as Butchoy, Nora's son
- Jhong Hilario as Vladimir
- Pen Medina as Ingkong Kapiz
- Louise de los Reyes as Sofia
- Jackie Rice as Prinsesa Alissandra
- Valeen Montenegro as Rachelle
- Crazy Duo as Mickey & Bugs

=== Special Participation ===
- Helga Krapf as young Milagros
- Luz Fernandez as Komadrona
- Petite
- Bangky as Dedo "Mang Dedz" Manzano
- Lotlot de Leon as Aling Dara
- Shalala
- Ahron Villena
- Tart Carlos
- Marlou Arizala
- Odette Khan
- Matet de Leon as Nora
- Ryan Bang as Mang Ben
- Aling Carmen

== Sequel ==
A sequel was announced on August 20, 2019, on Twitter entitled Mang Kepweng: Ang Lihim ng Bandanang Itim and part of the 2020 Metro Manila Film Festival and to be released on December 25, 2020.

== See also ==
- List of ghost films
- Da Possessed
- Agent X44
- D' Anothers
- Mr. Suave
