= Agent X44 =

2007 film directed by Joyce E. Bernal

- Agent X44 Official Poster
- Directed by: Joyce Bernal
- Written by: Mel Mendoza-Del Rosario; Galo Ador; Trina Marie Dusaban; Raz de la Torre
- Story by: Edgar "Bobot" Mortiz
- Produced by: Tess Fuentes
- Starring: Vhong Navarro
- Cinematography: Charlie Peralta
- Edited by: Renewin Alano
- Music by: Charles "Chuckie" Dreyfus; Jun Regalado
- Production company: Star Cinema
- Release date: January 17, 2007
- Running time: 93 mins
- Country: Philippines
- Language: Filipino
- Box office: ₱98.5 million

Agent X44 is a 2007 Filipino action spy comedy film directed by Joyce E. Bernal and starring Vhong Navarro as Agent X44 with Mariel Rodriguez in her film debut. The film was also the last movie of veteran actor Tony Ferrer prior to his death in 2021.

The film was produced by Star Cinema and is based on the Agent X-44 character previously played by Ferrer, which originated in the 1965 spy film G-2, directed by Eddie Garcia. It is the third film featuring Navarro to have been directed by Bernal after Mr. Suave (2003) and D' Anothers (2005).

== Plot ==
King Aguila and his best friend, Junior Iskalibers take the entrance exam of an academy for secret agents. King is the godson of Agent X44 Tony Falcon who is approaching retirement. Ever since he was a child, King has idolized Tony and wants to be a secret agent like him. King and Junior are admitted into the academy under the supervision of Colonel Cynthia Abordo, but turn out to be the most incompetent trainees.

In the academy, King meets Mary Grace Talagtag, another neophyte agent. She develops a crush on King, but keeps it to herself. One day, she asks King out on a date and decides to tell him of her love for him when King rushes out of the restaurant to save a girl. Thinking that King is embracing the girl, Mary Grace is convinced that he is a playboy. After graduating from the academy as Agent 690, she decides to accept West Point training being offered to her, and leaves the country with bitter feelings towards King. When she returns from her training, Mary Grace immediately becomes the top agent in the country. King is given three cases to solve, but he fails each one of them, leading the agency to demote him to a clerical job. He and Junior graduate as "reserve agents" who temporarily work as janitors in the agency headquarters, much to their dismay.

One night, the Philippines' most important artifact, Lapulapu’s bolo which he used to kill Ferdinand Magellan in 1521, is stolen from a museum. Minerva Castillo, the museum's curator, contacts the agency for help, saying that the dagger has the ability to turn water into crude oil. Being the top agent, Mary Grace expects the mission to be assigned to her but is shocked when Tony for pushes for King to be included in the mission.

With the help of Junior, King nearly gets the dagger but loses it again. Disappointed with King, Tony gets depressed and accidentally falls into a manhole. Cynthia decides to take King out of the mission. During Tony's wake, Junior pretends to be the ghost of Tony and terrorizes Cynthia into reinstating King in the mission. Cynthia decides to pair King with Mary Grace to retrieve the dagger.

The dagger falls into the hands of three rival crime lords - Mustafah Saleh, an Arab vampire millionaire who sees the dagger as a threat to his family's oil business; Leah, a Polynesian princess who wants to retrieve the dagger because they have the seawater resources but not the equipment to turn it into oil; and Purubutu-san, a Yakuza head who wants to retrieve the dagger because he has the seawater resources plus the machinery to market it all over the world.

King and Mary Grace infiltrate Mustafah's hideout in Floridablanca and subdue him, but the dagger is stolen by Leah. They then infiltrate Leah's beach resort hideout, where the dagger is being auctioned. King shoots Leah, but Minerva steals the dagger and flees with goons by boat. Distraught, King mourns Tony at the manhole, only for the latter to show up, saying he had faked his death to push King to excel. Encouraged, King organizes a comprehensive investigation which finds that Minerva, whom he slept with prior to their mission at the beach resort, was previously a monkey genetically engineered to become human by Purubutu-san, much to King's disgust. King and Mary Grace infiltrate Purubutu-san's lair, but Mary Grace is captured and King is temporarily paralyzed. Upon recovery, King, with the help of Cynthia, defeat Purubutu and his goons, rescue Mary Grace and retrieve the dagger, escaping before the lair is blown up by a time bomb. King is promoted into a regular agent and becomes a couple with Mary Grace, while Tony reappears to everyone's surprise.

In an epilogue, Cynthia reveals that a corrected translation of the inscriptions on Lapu-Lapu's dagger means that it actually produces cooking oil rather than crude oil, much to her frustration.

== Cast ==
=== Main cast ===
- Vhong Navarro as Reserve Agent King Agila / Agent X44
- Mariel Rodriguez as Mary Grace Talagtag / Agent 690

=== Supporting cast ===
- Cassandra Ponti as Minerva Castillo
- Uma Khouny as Mustafah Saleh
- Pokwang as Col. Cynthia Abordo
- Mura as Anton / Agent Junior Iskalibers
- Juliana Palermo as Selecta Papadakis
- John Lapus as Baklus
- Epi Quizon as Karansai Purubutu-san
- Juddha Paolo as Mr. Clean

=== Special Participation ===
- Tony Ferrer as Tony Falcon / Agent X44
- Archie Alemania as Barber

== Reception ==
=== Rating ===
MTRCB, a Philippine media board, has initially rated the movie R-18 due to topless scenes of both Cassandra Ponti and Mariel Rodriguez but was re-rated to PG-13.

=== Box office ===
On its opening day, Agent X44 did well as it grossed ₱18.5 million. After a week of its showing, the film made a ₱60 million. Its overall gross was ₱98.5 million.

== See also ==
- ABS-CBN Corporation
- Star Cinema
