= Mahal (actress) =

Filipino actress, comedian, and vlogger (1974–2021)

- Mahal in 2021
- Born: Noemi Tesorero; December 20, 1974; San Miguel, Catanduanes, Philippines
- Died: August 31, 2021 (aged 46); Batangas, Philippines
- Occupations: Actress; comedian; vlogger
- Years active: 1988–2021
- Height: 91 cm (3 ft 0 in)
- Spouse: Jobbie Hebrio (m. 2015; sep. 2017)

YouTube information
- Channel: MAHAL
- Years active: 2020–2021
- Genre: Vlog
- Subscribers: 858,000
- Views: 92.7 million
- Last updated: 4 August 2026

Mahal was the professional name of Noemi Tesorero (December 20, 1974 – August 31, 2021), a Filipino actress, comedian, and vlogger. She had dwarfism and was noted for her childlike roles, being said to have a very giggly personality.

== Family ==
Mahal was the daughter of Romy Tesorero, and had a stepmother Josefa. Her grandmother gave her the nickname "Mahal", which became her stage name. She had a sister in the United States who owned a restaurant in Cleveland and a brother who was a policeman in Palawan. Although her family was well-off and she was not required to work, Mahal insisted on doing so.

In an episode of Tunay na Buhay Mahal shared her motto, which was to keep on smiling despite the problems life throws at you.

== Career ==
Mahal became popular when she was featured in a newspaper article, with a policeman comparing her size to that of an ArmaLite assault rifle. She was then featured by Inday Badiday in her talk show Eye to Eye before appearing regularly in 1988 on the noontime television show Lunch Date. She later starred in several TV shows including Idol Ko si Kap and Bahay Mo Ba 'To?, and also guested in an episode of Dear Uge with Pokwang.

Standing three feet tall and living with dwarfism, Mahal often used self-deprecating humor, taking roles using her height to comic effect or to fulfil the demands of fantasy characters. She played the role of the elfin daughter in the 1991 film Anak ni Janice, and also portrayed the mother of Vhong Navarro's character in the 2003 film Mr. Suave, in which Dagul, another actor with dwarfism, also appeared.

Mahal also ventured into singing, forming a tandem in Magandang Tanghali Bayan with Allan Padua, who was better known as Mura and also had dwarfism.

In 2013 Mahal changed her image to that of a mature and liberated woman, showing off a tattoo and wearing revealing outfits in TV guest appearances. She also became known for giving candid interviews containing sexual innuendo and was not shy about revealing her age. During an appearance on the morning radio program Good Times in 2007 she admitted to spreading a scandalous video a few years earlier, and in an episode of Face the People Mahal lamented the mismanagement of her career by her manager Jethro Carrey, and his alleged favoritism towards his other newer talents.

Mahal also started to accept more mature projects, such as the indie film Gigolo, and did some gigs at comedy bars in Manila. She featured in the 2021 television series Owe My Love, but due to the risk of COVID-19 her taping was cut short. She also started a YouTube channel in July 2020 where she regularly posted vlogs with actor and YouTuber Mygz Molino, gathering 500,000 subscribers by the time of her death in August 2021. Weeks prior to her death Mahal received public attention for her reunion with Mura – her on-screen pairing for almost two decades – when one of her vlogs showed a behind-the-scenes look at her final TV appearance on Kapuso Mo, Jessica Soho. She visited Mura in Guinobatan, Albay, and as well as reconnecting with him Mahal provided some words of encouragement, groceries, and cash.

== Romantic life ==
Mahal was the subject of controversy over her romantic life. She was known for being in a relationship with singer Jimboy Salazar, who died in 2015, and also with aspiring actor Aries Navarro. She named Salazar as the most "plastic" person she had met in showbiz, but did not comment any further on him when he planned to marry his boyfriend in March 2015 after coming out as gay. At that time Mahal was in a relationship with Jimmy Navarro, a widower, and not related to Aries Navarro.

On November 2, 2015 Mahal married Jobbie Hebrio, a butcher and merchandiser in a supermarket at the Quezon City Hall. The marriage was witnessed by singers Mae Rivera and Kissa Kurdi, both close friends of Mahal, and city councillor Victor Ferrer, whose farm in Quezon City provided the venue for the wedding reception. Aries Navarro was not happy when he heard about Mahal's marriage to Hebrio, saying Mahal fooled and cheated on him, and that they were still together when Mahal secretly started seeing Hebrio. Aries said that he often saw Mahal hiding from him when she was on the phone, while Mahal said that she felt used by him but was now happily in love with her new husband. She asked Aries to leave her alone, move on, and be happy for her. Aries said that he was happy for Mahal and that he had no other choice. However after two years of being together Mahal and Hebrio decided to split up.

Mahal said she was afraid to fall in love again due to her previous relationship with Hebrio and instead decided to prioritize helping her family. However, in 2017 Mahal was rumored to have a new boyfriend, Sam Jacinto. But Jacinto clarified that they were just friends and asked the public to stop judging their relationship because Mahal was still married. She also candidly disclosed that she had a crush on her Owe My Love co-star Joaquin Manansala, but maintained her professionalism at work.

Mahal had first met indie actor Mygz Molino in a show in Abra in 2010, and had lived with him in Marikina City. After the taping of Owe My Love in 2021 Molino wanted to live in his hometown Tanauan with Mahal, but before Molino decided to bring her with him he asked the permission of her mother and siblings. However, some unknown relative did not approve of Mahal and Molino's pairing, accusing Molino of using Mahal to get vlog views and generate income. Mahal defended her decision to be with Molino and they did live together in Tanauan.

== Death ==
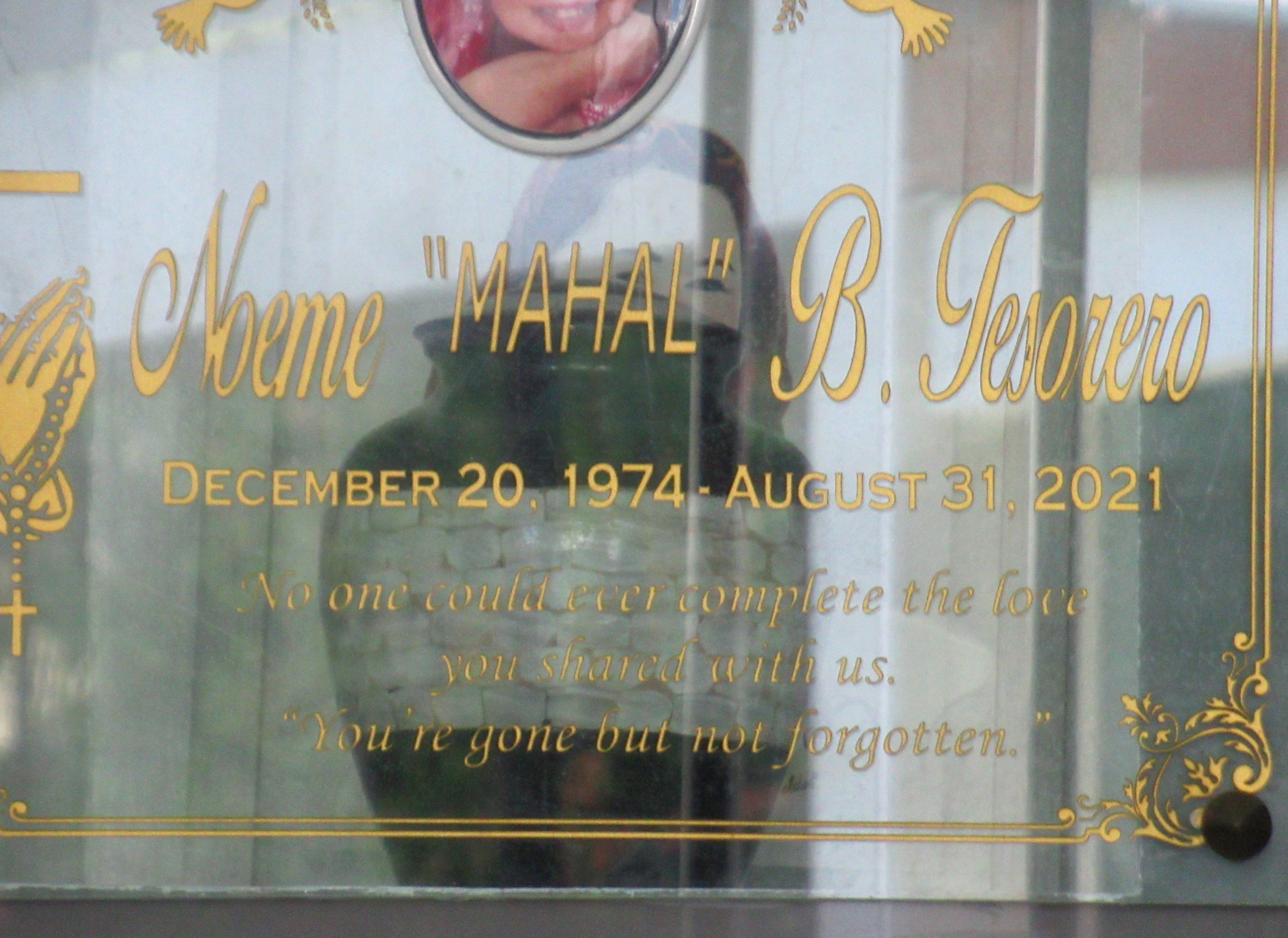
Mahal's grave and urn at the Himlayang Pilipino Memorial Park, Quezon City

Mahal died on August 31, 2021 in a hospital in Batangas. According to her sister Irene Tesorero she died due to gastroenteritis and COVID-19. Because of her dwarfism she was considered to be at high risk for COVID-19, but she also had pre-existing conditions, including hypertension.

Rosanna Roces, Inday Garutay, Brenda Mage, and Jerald Napoles were among the first celebrities to mourn Mahal. Owe My Love co-stars and close friends Ai-Ai delas Alas and Kiray Celis were surprised to hear of her sudden demise, while netizens and other celebrities took to social media to express their grief. When Mura found out about Mahal's death he first dismissed the reports as fake news.

Mahal's siblings dismissed rumors that they were blaming Mygz Molino and Mahal's manager for Mahal's death, saying that in fact they were very thankful for the efforts exerted by the pair to revive Mahal until the very end.

Mahal's remains were cremated in Batangas, with her family taking her urn to the Santuario de San Vicente de Paul Shrine in Quezon City.

== Filmography ==
=== Film ===
Year	Title	Role
1989	Last Two Minutes	
1990	Small and Terrible	Flower Girl (uncredited)
1991	Anak ni Janice	
1997	Kokey	Kokey
2003	Mr. Suave	Rico Suave's mother
2003	Utang ng Ama	Nuno sa punso
2007	Pasukob	Flower Girl
2010	Shake, Rattle and Roll 12	The Mamanyiika (uncredited)
2012	Id'Nal (Mapusok)	Aling Belen
2013	Gigolo	

=== Television ===
Year	Title	Role
1988	Eye to Eye	Herself
1988	Lunch Date	Herself
1998–2005	MTB	Herself (co-host)
2000	Idol Ko si Kap	
2004	Bahay Mo Ba 'To?	
2005	SiS	
2006	John En Shirley	
2012	Gandang Gabi, Vice!	Herself (guest)
2012	Sarah G. Live	Herself
2013	Toda Max	Isabelita
2013	Banana Nite (Ihaw Na! segment)	Herself
2013	Face the People	Herself
2014–2016	Ismol Family	Big Boss
2015–2016	#ParangNormal Activity	Tiyanak / Nuno Girl
2017	Full House Tonight	Various
2019–2020	One of the Baes	Queen Floribeth Higantes
2020	Tunay na Buhay	Herself
2021	Owe My Love	Mini Divi
2021	Dear Uge	Dyosa
2021	The Boobay and Tekla Show	Herself (guest)
2021	Kapuso Mo, Jessica Soho	Herself (last TV appearance)

== Discography ==
Singles
Year	Title	Album	Label
2003	Ayoko Na Sa' Yo	Mag Otso-Otso Tayo Bayan	Star Records
2003	Cutie Cute, Cute	Mag Otso-Otso Tayo Bayan	Star Records
2003	Mahal At Mura	Mag Otso-Otso Tayo Bayan	Star Records
2003	Cutie Cute, Cute	Pinay Pie (Original Motion Picture Soundtrack)	Star Records
