= Toda Max =

2011–13 Philippine television series

- Title Card
- Genre: Sitcom
- Written by: Raymund Barcelon; Christopher Viriña; Natividad de Leon
- Directed by: Joven Tan
- Creative director: Malu L. Sevilla
- Starring: Robin Padilla; Vhong Navarro; Angel Locsin; Pokwang
- Opening theme: "Toda Max" by Lito Camo
- Country of origin: Philippines
- Original language: Filipino
- No. of episodes: 105

Production
- Executive producer: Rocky Ubana
- Producer: Cynthia Jordan
- Editors: Bren John de Leon; Omar Cervantes; TJ Payumo
- Running time: 45 minutes
- Production companies: ABS-CBN Studios; RGD Unit

Original release
- Network: ABS-CBN
- Release: November 5, 2011 – November 16, 2013

Toda Max is a Philippine television situational comedy series broadcast by ABS-CBN. Directed by Joven Tan, it stars Robin Padilla, Pokwang, Angel Locsin and Vhong Navarro. It aired on the network's Yes Weekend! line up from November 5, 2011 to November 16, 2013, and was replaced by Home Sweetie Home. Though due to 3 movie commitments, Padilla decided to leave the show in early of 2013 and hoped to come back after doing all his movies.

The fast-cuts and full episodes of this sitcom is currently available online on Jeepney TV's YouTube Channel.

== Overview ==
=== Synopsis ===
After the tragic death of his wife, Bartolome decides to leave the province and move to his cousin's house in Manila with his two kids. He's shocked with the high standard of living in the city, but is still determined to create a comfortable life for his family. Meanwhile, his cousin Justin is trying hard to earn money as a cook in a small-time eatery. Together, they will face life's challenges with much enthusiasm and lessons learned along the way.

=== Finale ===
Toda Max was originally going to air its final episode on November 16, 2013 after 2 years of airing and will be replaced by Home Sweetie Home but the former was extended by one more episode due to the month-long second anniversary special as well as the delayed telecast due to the victims of Typhoon Yolanda.

== Cast and characters ==
=== Main cast ===
- Vhong Navarro as Justino "Justin Bibbo" Batumbakal, Jr.
- Angel Locsin as Isabel Padausdos
- Pokwang as Beverly "Lady G." Gil
- Ai-Ai delas Alas as Vangie "Ate Van" Batumbakal

=== Supporting cast ===
- Izzy Canillo as Ronald Batumbakal
- Myrtle Sarrosa as Myrtle "Tita Maristela"
- Paul Salas as Jonas
- Al Tantay as Macario "Mac" Padausdos
- Darwin Tolentino as Hap Rice
- Alex Calleja as Alex
- Cecil Paz as Wendy
- Marvin Yap as Marvin
- Virgilio del Carmel as Virgilio

=== Former cast ===
- Robin Padilla as Bartolome "Tol" Batumbakal
- Aaliyah Benisano as Sandy Batumbakal
- Jobert Austria as Bruno

=== Guest cast ===
- Val Iglesias as Lady G's bully ex-husband
- Candy Pangilinan as Madam Apple
- Isabella Manjon as Cristy
- Cacai Bautista as Yaya Aguila
- Pilita Corrales as Lola Momsie
- Kim Chiu as Maimai
- Jojit Lorenzo as Pandong
- Paloma as Angelica Goli
- Melai Cantiveros as Nikki
- Beverly Salviejo as Rihanna
- Bea Alonzo as Sasi
- Rayver Cruz as Jun-Jun
- Smokey Manaloto as Benny Maniniquil
- Maliksi Morales as Niknok Maniniquil
- Cristine Reyes as Joy Maligaya
- Joey Marquez as Daniel
- Randy Santiago as Baby Manoling
- Matteo Guidicelli as Matt Alvarado
- Neil Coleta as Carding
- Marina Benipayo as Matt's Mother
- Jake Cuenca as Felix Bakat
- Phil Younghusband as Tisoy
- Jodi Sta. Maria as Selena Golez
- Maja Salvador as Darling Padausdos
- Bentong as Ben Chan
- Rommel Padilla as Romy
- Toni Gonzaga as Maxene
- Dennis Padilla as Brutus
- Bayani Agbayani as Thor
- Gerald Anderson as Buddy Torres
- Valerie Concepcion as Dianne
- Dominic Ochoa as Johnny
- Bing Davao as Tricycle operator
- Benjie Paras as Benjo
- Dennis Padilla as Mando
- Angel Sy as Jessica
- April Boy Regino as Boogie
- Nash Aguas as Bugoy
- Sharlene San Pedro as Shane
- Trina Legaspi as Jessica
- Dick Israel as Bar Customer
- Leo Martinez as Lloydie
- Lilia Cuntapay as White Lady
- Ogie Diaz as Mamu
- Angeline Quinto as Angeline Quintas
- Jamilla Obispo as Maxim
- Gina Pareño as Gorgonia
- Kiray Celis as Jeng-Jeng
- K Brosas as Madame K
- Carmina Villarroel as Chef Mina
- Marco Gumabao as Marco
- Enrique Gil as Jojo Alahas
- Ella Cruz as Betty
- Jhong Hilario as Papa Gangnam
- Sam Milby as Doc Milby
- Anjo Yllana as Dino Tengco (character from the classic sitcom Abangan Ang Susunod Na Kabanata)
- Billy Crawford as Paolo
- Rufa Mae Quinto as Wei Da
- Ruffa Gutierrez as Susie
- Keempee de Leon as Wella
- Maricar Reyes as Lady Z (alter-ego of Lady G)
- Jon Avila as (alter-ego of Tatay Mac)
- Xian Lim as Earl
- Meg Imperial as Gem
- Gretchen Barretto
- Ruby Rodriguez as Myka
- Daniel Matsunaga as Victor
- Iza Calzado as Ka Iza
- Eula Valdez as Dra. Yola
- Nikki Gil as Carly Crawford
- Alex Gonzaga as Leila
- Joross Gamboa as Martin
- Gio Alvarez as Ricky
- Hyubs Azarcon as Johnny
- Kean Cipriano as James
- Keanna Reeves as Lola
- Diana Zubiri as Alex
- Andrew E. as himself
- Sexbomb Girls as Yoga Girls
- Jon Santos as Ate Bhe
- Janice de Belen as Janet Magpoles
- Jericho Rosales as Sir Chef

==== As themselves ====
- Jai Agpangan
- Joj Agpangan
- Karen Reyes
- Kit Thompson
- Ryan Boyce
- Erich Gonzales
- Jessy Mendiola
- Danilo Barrios
- Julia Montes
- Zanjoe Marudo
- Kathryn Bernardo
- Daniel Padilla
- Kaye Abad
- Bugoy Drilon
- Maricel Soriano
- Candy Pangilinan
- Laudico Guevarra
- Nadia Montenegro
- Jason Abalos
- German Moreno
- Nene Tamayo
- Bea Saw
- Keanna Reeves
- Slater Young

=== Anniversary episodes ===
==== Guest cast ====
- Epi Quizon as Tim
- Vandolph Quizon as Tom
- Ai-Ai delas Alas as Aina
- Edgar Mortiz as Bobot
- Tirso Cruz III as Pip
- Richard Gomez as Ricky
- Rommel Padilla as Gabriel
- Lou Veloso as Uncle Mapaginitan
- Dawn Zulueta as Emily Mapaginitan
- Sam Milby
- Kim Chiu
- Maja Salvador
- Alexa Ilacad as Jing
- Nash Aguas as Darryl
- Chicosci
- Kean Cipriano
- Tutti Caringal
- Basilyo
- Atoy Co
- Sylvia Sanchez
- Mahal
- JC de Vera as Jake
- Regine Angeles as Apple
- Sunshine Cruz
- Arjo Atayde
- Kyle Banzon

== Awards and nominations ==
Year	Award	Category	Work	Result
2012	34th Catholic Mass Media Awards	Best Comedy Program	Cast and crew	Won
2012	PMPC Star Awards For Television	Best Comedy/Gag show	Cast and crew	Won
2012	PMPC Star Awards For Television	Best Comedy Actor	Robin Padilla	Won
2012	PMPC Star Awards For Television	Best Comedy Actor	Vhong Navarro	Nominated
2012	PMPC Star Awards For Television	Best Comedy Actress	Pokwang	Won
2012	PMPC Star Awards For Television	Best Comedy Actress	Angel Locsin	Nominated
2013	PMPC Star Awards For Television	Best Comedy Actress	Angel Locsin	Nominated
2013	Golden Screen TV Awards	Outstanding Performance by an Actress in a Gag or Comedy Program	Angel Locsin	Nominated
2013	21st KBP Golden Dove Awards	Best Comedy Program	Cast and crew	Won

== See also ==
- List of programs broadcast by ABS-CBN
