= Mura (actor) =

Filipino actor and comedian

- Born: Allan Padua; March 26, 1969 (age 57); Guinobatan, Albay, Philippines
- Occupations: Actor, comedian
- Years active: 2002–2018

Allan Padua (born March 26, 1969), known professionally as Mura, is a Filipino actor and comedian who has dwarfism.

== Early life ==
Allan Padua was born in Guinobatan, Albay. He spent most of his childhood in Guinobatan with his 13 siblings. Born with dwarfism, his father believes that he inherited his small stature from the doll his mother used to play with through the folk belief of lihi. Allan Padua received ridicule growing up in elementary school and by his neighbors due to his small stature.

== Career ==
Padua capitalized on his condition by working as a ball juggler for five years as a means to financially support his family. He aspired to be an actor, and sang as a pastime. In 2002, he went to Manila for better job opportunities securing a role as a backup dancer. He was then scouted by a talent manager who asked him to play a bigger role in a show.

Later adopting the screenname "Mura", Padua had break in his entertainment career in 2003, when he became associated with Mahal, an actress-comedian who also has dwarfism. Mura became known as Mahal's "twin" and occasionally played the "sidekick" roles to characters portrayed by actor Vhong Navarro.

Mura also ventured into singing with Noemi Tesorero, better known as Mahal, who also has dwarfism, with whom he formed a tandem in Magandang Tanghali Bayan.

Mura played roles in several feature films such as Volta (2004), D' Anothers (2005), Agent X44 (2007) and Supahpapalicious (2008) and Kimidora and the Temple of Kyeme (2012). Mura also made appearances in other television shows such as Majika (2006) and Supertwins (2007). In 2005, he was able to purchase farmland in Bicol using his earning as an actor.

== Accidents and later career ==
Mura's career saw a decline in 2010. He was involved in a vehicular accident while riding a tricycle which affected his hips and legs. The accident caused him to have long-term difficulty in walking affecting his future prospects in acting.

Mura was to feature in FPJ's Ang Probinsyano, sometime prior to key actor Eddie Garcia's death in 2019, but the stint did not push through due to Mura's weakened legs making him unable to run.

As of 2021, Mura works as a farmer in Bicol, but still intends to return to showbiz.

On April 27, 2024, Mura's 2-story home in Purok 3, Sitio Abibling, Barangay Tupas, Ligao was razed by fire. He only saved his cellphone and a storage box. Interviewed in Kapuso Mo, Jessica Soho May 5 episode, Soho led comedians Ai-Ai delas Alas, Pokwang, Jayson Gainza, Empoy Marquez, and Katipunan ng mga Artistang Pilipino sa Pelikula at Telebisyon President Imelda Papin in extending financial aids to Mura.

== Filmography ==
=== Film ===
Year	Title	Role
2004	Volta	9 Volts
2005	D' Anothers	Vic
2007	Agent X44	Anton / Agent Junior Iskalibers
2008	Supahpapalicious	Macho
2009	Kimmy Dora: Kambal sa Kiyeme	Lolo / herbal doctor
2012	Kimmy Dora and the Temple of Kiyeme	Lolo / Herbal Doctor

=== Television/digital Series ===
Year	Title	Role	Notes	Source
2003—2004	Masayang Tanghali, Bayan / MTB: Ang Saya-Saya	Abby (host; Mahal's "twin")		
2004	Marina	Ninja	Other Creatures	
2004	Maalaala Mo Kaya	Mura	Episode: "Lupa"; Credited as "Mura"	
2004	Wansapanataym	Dondee	Episode: "Dondee, da Duwende"	
2006	Majika		Guest Cast / Antagonist / Anti-Hero	
2006	Bahay Mo Ba 'To?			
2006	Komiks		Episode: "Alpha Omega Girl"; Credited as "Mura"	
2007	Super Twins	Metallad	Supporting Cast / Antagonist	
2007	Magic Kamison	Rufo	Episode: "Little Big Rufo"; Credited as "Mura"	
2007—2008	Zaido: Pulis Pangkalawakan	Buboy	Guest Cast	
2008	Carlo J. Caparas' Tasya Fantasya	Pookalakala	Supporting Cast / Protagonist	
2009	Midnight DJ	Demonyong Ahas	Guest Cast / Antagonist	
2009—2010	Darna	Impy / Impakta	Guest Cast / Antagonist	
2010—2011	My Driver Sweet Lover	Boy Baldado	Episode: "Pamilya at mga kaibigan ni Rocky"; Credited as "Mura"	
2012	Enchanted Garden	Bonsai	Extended Cast	
2015—2016	#ParangNormal Activity	Nuno Boy		
2018	Tadhana	Angelo	Episode: "Little Tatay"; Credited as "Mura"	

== Discography ==
Singles
Year	Title	Album	Label
2003	Ayoko Na Sa' Yo	Mag Otso-Otso Tayo Bayan	Star Records
2003	Cutie Cute, Cute	Mag Otso-Otso Tayo Bayan	Star Records
2003	Mahal At Mura	Mag Otso-Otso Tayo Bayan	Star Records
2003	Cutie Cute, Cute	Pinay Pie (Original Motion Picture Soundtrack)	Star Records
