= List of Kokey (TV series) episodes =

Kokey is an ABS-CBN fantaserye which was premiered on Primetime Bida from August 6, 2007, to November 9, 2007. The show is based on the 1997 film with the same title, the planned concept for the show is in continuation to its 10th anniversary of the film, the show lasted for 70 episodes and was followed by Kokey at Ako.

== Series overview ==
Year	Episode numbers	Episodes	Originally released	
Year	Episode numbers	Episodes	First released	Last released
2007	1–70	70	August 6, 2007	November 9, 2007

== Episodes ==
=== 2007 ===
No.	Title	Original release date
1	"Pilot (Ang Simula)"	August 6, 2007
2	"Nicassio Tells His Mother That Myra Is the One Who Killed Isidro (Ang Pumatay kay Isidro)"	August 7, 2007
3	"Bong was Amazed When He Saw a Spaceship"	August 8, 2007
4	"Will Bong's Dream of Finally Belonging to a Family Come True? (Pangarap na Pamilya)"	August 9, 2007
5	"Bong Meets His Newest Bestfriend (Bagong Best Friend)"	August 10, 2007
6	"Anna Doesn't Accept Bong as Her New Brother (Bagong Kapatid)"	August 13, 2007
7	"Nicassio Still Looks for His Nephew to Claim the Inheritance He's Been Wanting All His Life (Paghahanap sa Pamangkin)"	August 14, 2007
8	"Myra Worries about Nicassio's Evil Plan for Her Son (Masamang Plano sa Anak)"	August 15, 2007
9	"Anna Finds Out about Bong's Alien Friend, Kokey (Ang Kaibigang Alien)"	August 16, 2007
10	"Bong and Anna Bring Along Kokey to Their School (Si Kokey sa Paaralan)"	August 17, 2007
11	"Jimboy's Curiosity on Bong's Whereabouts Leads Him into Trouble (Si Jimboy at si Bong)"	August 20, 2007
12	"Shane Visits Bong at His New Home and with His New Family (Bagong Pamilya)"	August 21, 2007
13	"Myra Gets a Chance to Be Freed from the Prison (Paglaya ni Myra)"	August 22, 2007
14	"How Will Anna Accept the Fact That Abie's Heart Belongs to Someone Else? (Puso ni Abie)"	August 23, 2007
15	"Can Kokey Make Use of His Powers to Heal Nanding? (Kapangyarihan ni Kokey)"	August 24, 2007
16	"Bong Was Blamed About the Fire at Kalugdan's House (Sunog sa Bahay ng mga Kalugdan)"	August 27, 2007
17	"Jimboy and Bong Get into a Fight (Awayan ni Jimboy at Bong)"	August 28, 2007
18	"Trining Is Starting to Believe that Bong Brings Bad Luck to Their Family (Hatid na Malas sa Pamilya)"	August 29, 2007
19	"Myra Finally Saw Her Son, Bong (Pagkikita ng Mag-ina)"	August 30, 2007
20	"Marcial Connives with Nicassio to Take Away Bong from the Kalugdans (Paglayo kay Bong sa mga Kalugdan)"	August 31, 2007
21	"Tension Rises as Bong's Past Is About to Be Revealed (Nakaraan ni Bong)"	September 3, 2007
22	"Charisse Receives an Unexpected Guest, Nicassio (Hindi Inaasahang Bisita ni Charisse)"	September 4, 2007
23	"Things Get Out of Hand When Everyone Got Electrocuted with Their Sizes Shrinking! (Pagliit mula sa Kuryente)"	September 5, 2007
24	"Another Exciting Adventure Comes Along with Kokey and Friends (Adventure nina Kokey at mga Kaibigan)"	September 6, 2007
25	"What Danger Awaits Doña Ingrid in the Hands of Nicassio? (Kapahamakan sa Kamay ni Nicassio)"	September 7, 2007
26	"Charisse and Marcial are Held Hostage at Their Own House While the Kids Remain De-sized (Paghostage kina Charisse at Marcial)"	September 10, 2007
27	"Charisse and Marcial are Having a Marital Problem (Problemang Mag-asawa)"	September 11, 2007
28	"Another Adventure Begins When Anna was Taken by a Bird (Dinukot ng Ibon si Anna)"	September 12, 2007
29	"Nicassio Continues to Plot His Evil Schemes Even When in Jail (Masamang Plano ni Nicassio)"	September 13, 2007
30	"Is this Bong and His Friends' Chance to Finally Go Home? (Pag-uwi nina Bong at mga Kaibigan)"	September 14, 2007
