= Rounin (TV series) =

- Title card
- Also known as: Erik Matti's Rounin
- Genre: Drama; Romance; Action; Fantasy; Sci Fi
- Created by: Erik Matti; Philip King
- Developed by: ABS-CBN Studios
- Directed by: Jerome C. Pobocan
- Starring: Luis Manzano; Angelica Panganiban; Rafael Rosell; Jhong Hilario; Nikki Gil; Shaina Magdayao; Rayver Cruz; Joross Gamboa; Melissa Ricks; Geoff Eigenmann; Aaron Junatas; Agot Isidro; Ina Raymundo; Monsour del Rosario; Aubrey Miles; Diether Ocampo
- Composer: Jessie Lasaten
- Country of origin: Philippines
- Original language: Filipino
- No. of episodes: 67

Production
- Executive producers: Joan del Rosario; Joven Tan
- Running time: 25-30 minutes
- Production companies: Reality Films; Larger Than Life Productions

Original release
- Network: ABS-CBN
- Release: April 16 – July 26, 2007

Rounin is a 2007 Philippine television drama romance series broadcast by ABS-CBN. Directed by Jerome C. Pobocan, it stars Luis Manzano, Angelica Panganiban, Rafael Rosell, Jhong Hilario, Nikki Gil, Shaina Magdayao, Rayver Cruz, Joross Gamboa, Melissa Ricks, Geoff Eigenmann, Aaron Junatas, Agot Isidro, Ina Raymundo, Monsour del Rosario, Aubrey Miles and Diether Ocampo. It aired on the network's Primetime Bida line up and worldwide on TFC from April 16 to July 26, 2007, replacing Princess Hours. It is a fantasy and martial arts series shown in Philippine TV and is said to be one of the most expensive locally produced TV series aired in the Philippines. It is also the first Filipino (and the first Southeast Asian) series shot using high-definition video technology. The series is line produced by Reality Films while Larger Than Life Productions is handling post, visual effects, VFX supervision, mastering and grading. The series was shot using Panasonic’s P2 technology.

== Synopsis ==
Rounin is the story of an elite group of warriors who live in a place called Lumeria. It also happens to take place on a totally different planet.

The Rounin(s) are tasked to protect the city and its inhabitants against the threats of Helion, the City of Death. Each Rounin specializes in a martial arts discipline, and is commanded by the master Rounin, the leader of Lumeria. While battling their enemies, the Rounin strive to adhere to their tenets - one that they cannot fall in love with each other.

The show centers around the quest of a young Rounin warrior, Mythos, as he tries to piece together his past to unlock his true identity.

== Cast and characters ==
=== Main characters ===
The main cast and characters of the series are enumerated below.

Actor	Character	Character Description
Diether Ocampo	Cadmus	Prudence. The master of Rounin & leader of Lumeria. Master of the martial art of Furian (Shado and Katana). Rules with wisdom, not force. He is elevated as the master of the Legendary Rounin Circle that fought and won the Great War that finally gave Lumeria ultimate freedom and peace. He was the only survivor of the 1st Generation of Rounin. His original element was Earth, but later gained the element of Light (the medallion controlling all five elements) after being made the Master of the Rounin, and Ruler of Lumeria.
Luis Manzano	Juris	Service & Justice. Member of the 2nd Generation of Rounin. The strongest (of the five) Rounin. His aggressiveness matches his mastery of Freega (Muay Thai). Justice is his motivation for combat. His greatest weakness is love. He has a forbidden relationship with a fellow Rounin, Aura. His medallion's element is Fire.
Angelica Panganiban	Aura	Passion & Love. Member of the 2nd Generation of Rounin. The master of Aria (Wu Shu). Love is her motivation for fighting...for the kingdom, and love for Juris. Unknown to her, she is also the object of affection of Creon. Her medallion's element is Wind/Air. In the closing episode of the series, Aura and Juris marry and have a child.
Rafael Rosell	Creon	Pride & Freedom. Member of the 2nd Generation of Rounin. The Master of Armada (Capoeira). He is the son of Xander - 1st Generation Rounin, along with Master Cadmus. He feels pressure of being the son of Xander, A legendary Rounin. He was Juris' best friend, but became best friends with Venom later on; he had always resented his being second best to Juris in combat and in Aura’s heart. His medallion's element is Water. He is vanquished by his long lost brother Mythos in battle.
Nikki Gil	Leal	Patriotism & Loyalty. Member of the 2nd Generation of Rounin. Master of Katana (Kali). A Rounin that truly goes by the book; she is the second strongest (loyal) Rounin. She is Aura's confidant. She is a true friend to her peers and a joyous person that endears to the people around her. She has a complicated past involving her love to Xyrus and her duty as a Rounin. Her deceased father's un-fulfilled wish to become a Rounin was what drove her to become a Rounin herself. Leal dies in the fight against Helion's forces. Her medallion's element is Electricity.
Jhong Hilario	Venom	Deceit & Discord. Member of the 2nd Generation of Rounin. Master of Shado (Krav Maga). Dark and secretive; always seems to have ulterior motives for his "just" actions. His loyalty is not with the kingdom, but with Creon, because he owes Creon for helping him (Venom) become a Rounin, himself. He is aptly named, as his true character is revealed later on. His medallion's element is Earth.
Rayver Cruz	Mythos	Strength & Bravery. One of two chosen, 3rd Generation recruits, to the current (2nd Generation) members of Rounin, and one of elite students to pass the elimination and reach the top four, at Zephire. Mythos possesses extraordinary fighting skills that, he thinks, might have something to do with the father he never knew. When his mother refuses to talk about his father and about their life, before they arrived in Vesta, he knows that he has to find his father and the truth for himself. Little does he know that he belongs to a family of Rounin - Xander being his father, and Creon being his older brother - and his true name being "Cleo". He later receives the medallion of Water (it was temporary until when Braulio steals it for bringing Creon back to life in Helion, he borrows the medallion of Electricity from the deceased fellow Rounin Leal), as one of the two new recruits into the circle of 2nd Generation of Rounin. In the concluding episodes of the series, it was revealed that Mythos' real father was not the late Xander, but Cadmus himself, which explains why Mythos is the most powerful Rounin of his generation. He eventually inherits the leadership of Lumeria.
Shaina Magdayao	Selene	Respect. One of the elite students at Zephire, and top four chosen to become one of the two new recruits into the circle of the 2nd Generation of Rounin. She is Aura’s protégé. She has the making of the next Aria (Wu Shu) and Katana (Kali) master. She respects both her enemies and peers. Never bitter with defeat. She is the master apprentice of the Rounin school until Mythos came. She is happy to be reunited with Mythos and eventually falls in love with him. She later discovers that she is half-Helion, and that Vega is her half-sister, making Draco her father. She is later given status as Leader of the Palace Guard, if only for a short amount of time, to test her loyalty. Selene and Mythos are married by the end of the series, and have twin daughters. However, Selene's Helion heritage continues to hover over her newfound life.
Joross Gamboa	Thalon	Ambition. One of the elite students at Zephire, and top four chosen to become one of the two new recruits into the circle of the 2nd Generation of Rounin. He is Juris’ nephew and protégé. Student of Furian (Muay Thai). He is Selene’s closest ally, but he is slowly falling in love with her. He will be Mythos’ Rival in combat and in love but later became friend and ally after Mythos saves him, much in the same predicament that Juris, Aura, & Creon were in. He later receives the medallion of Fire, as one of the two new recruits into the circle of 2nd Generation of Rounin.
Melissa Ricks	Raysian	Competitiveness. One of the elite students at Zephire, and top four chosen to become one of the two new recruits into the circle of the 2nd Generation of Rounin. She is classmates with Mythos, Thalon, and Selene. She was also one of Mythos’ rivals, constantly butting heads with Mythos, during Mythos' first arrival to Zephire. During the Final Challenge, Mythos saves her life - carrying her while she was unconscious; she eventually warms up to Mythos and becomes one of his most trusted allies in battle. She swears on her life, her complete loyalty & allegiance to Mythos, and later develops feelings for him. Soon after, she was given status as Leader/General of the soldiers prepared to attack Helion, traveling alongside the Rounin. She dies in battle trying to save Mythos against a possessed Selene.
Diego Castro	Tristan	The Chosen One. Member of the 2nd Generation of Rounin. The Master of Bazooka (Cilatus). He is the eldest brother of Xyrus, return to the confessor, Argos, as merchants for killing a man while trying to jealous Creon. He has a super weapons against Lumeria, after Xander confused the dependable of willing.
Geoff Eigenmann	Xyrus	Wariness. He was sent to the city-prison, Argos, as punishment for killing a man while trying to protect Leal. He unwillingly worked for Septo while in Argos, but had turned on him after having met, spoken with, and helped, Juris. He becomes instrumental in saving and releasing Juris from being imprisoned in Argos. He is granted amnesty and is allowed to be free once again (more accurately, he was granted residency in Lumeria upon the end of the term of his punishment & imprisonment in Argos, coinciding upon the same time as Juris' extraction from Argos). He comes face to face with Leal, his former love. He ends up being a loyal and strong warrior, alongside the Rounin, helping to protect Lumeria, especially the Palace of Master Cadmus.
Aubrey Miles	Vega	The daughter of Draco - the king of Helion, and heiress to the throne of Helion, the arch-enemy of Cadmus and the entire kingdom of Lumeria. She resurrects and falls in love with Creon, using her power as a Helion and the power of the Water medallion. She later discovers that Selene is her half-sister, after Selene is captured in an attempt to lure Mythos, so that he would give up his medallion, for Selene's release. She is killed by Aura in a duel.
Agot Isidro	Naya	Naya would do just about anything for her daughter Selene. She may seem a social climbing and money-hungry woman but in truth she only wants Selene to escape the danger of her own sordid past. Her drive for Selene to become a Rounin is so that the power of a Rounin medallion would suppress or prevent the Helion blood, in Selene, to kick in, and show Selene's true nature - thus putting Selene in danger, and being subject to be sent to Argos.
Ina Raymundo	Reema	A good mother to Mythos (Cleo), who always thinks of her. She doesn’t want Mythos fighting, for fear of learning about the truth of his heritage. Always trying to hide their past, content to live a simple life and peace. She is Xander's wife, and Creon's mother. At one point during her marital disputes with Xander, she turns to Cadmus for consolation, she being Cadmus' beloved. Mythos was born as a result of this affair.
AJ Dee	Braulio	He is the right hand of Vega, the Queen of Helion. He is the one who executes attacks and masterminds plots against Lumeria. Secretly, he is in love with Vega and will battle Creon in her name.
Carlos Agassi	Septo	He is the camp leader of arrested criminals from Vesta, in Argos (a city-prison). He rules with an iron fist over a large piece of land, in Argos, and the criminals that inhabit those lands. He is feared by almost all except those who are from the Helion camp.
Monsour del Rosario	Draco	A power hungry king (of Helion). His only goal in life is to defeat and conquer Lumeria, as what his elder did before him. He has a special vendetta against Lumeria, after Cadmus survived their false peace treaty-turned-ambush. As Vega’s father, his mission is to mold her as a leader and have her follow in his footsteps.
Aaron Junatas	Kirra	He is an Enyo, a race of people who look like children but are in fact adults, he is the first person that Mythos befriends inside Lumeria. He has the power to heal injuries except his own. He becomes instrumental to Mythos and Rouninship and the discovery of his own identity.

=== Other characters ===
- Rico Barrera as Amon
- Mhyco Aquino as Lore
- Paw Diaz as Solana
- TJ Trinidad as Xander
- Jeni Hernandez as Armana
- Janice Hung as Zelian
- Emilio Garcia as Pharus
- Juddha Paolo as Tyro
- Ronnie Lazaro as Mang Elli
- Owen Bowen as Young Creon
- Jairus Aquino as Young Mythos
- Sharlene San Pedro as Young Selene
- Bea Nicolas as Young Vega

== Reception ==
=== Production ===
Rounin's story actually began in November 2005, when writer Philip King and creative manager Rondel Lindayag pitched the idea of the heroic "Rounin of Lumeria" to ABS-CBN executives. So unique and impressive was this idea, then known as project Mythos, it took them one and a half years to complete it. Searching for good location took them months until they finally found a 44-hectare abandoned cement factory in Binangonan, Rizal, and took two months to complete the cities of Helion, Lumeria, Vesta, Argos and Icarra. All of the cast went under three months of training martial arts, capoeira, muay thai, judo, kali, arnis and wushu.

=== Soundtrack ===
The original soundtrack was released by Star Records which include ten tracks including the theme song entitled "Argos" which was composed and interpreted by the band, Bamboo. Other tracks include the love theme for the series, entitled "Iniibig Kita" sung by Kitchie Nadal and "Tanging Ikaw" performed by Shamrock.

Also in the Rounin OST include 2006 Rockista grand prize grand winner, Bojo who sings “Walang Hangganan," Acel Bisa (former vocalist of Moonstar88) sings “Sa Ngalan ng Pag-Ibig,” Rock icon Kevin Roy, of Razorback performs “Kailanpaman,” and the superband, Sandwich sings “Humanda Ka” plus up and coming rock bands Bliss, Side Crash and North Groove performing “I Think Of You,” “One Last Time” and “Nasaan Ka Na,” respectively.

=== Premiere ===
On April 14, 2007, ABS-CBN aired a TV special entitled "The Making of Rounin: Ang Bagong Mitolohiya", a documentary on how Rounin was made and conceptualized. It was hosted by Anne Curtis and Luis Manzano.

== Broadcast time ==
As a result of low ratings, Rounin was bumped off to late-night timeslots after only two weeks on primetime.

- April 16 – 27 (Episodes 1-10): Monday-Friday 8:30-9:15 p.m.
- April 30 – June 7 (Episodes 11-40): Monday-Thursday 10:00-10:45 p.m., Friday 9:15-10:00 p.m.
- June 11 – July 26 (Episodes 41-68): Monday-Thursday 10:45-11:30 p.m.
