= Kokey (film) =

1997 Filipino science fiction film

- Theatrical release poster
- Directed by: Romy Suzara
- Written by: Jerry Lopez Sineneng; Don Cuaresma; Mari L. Mariano; Cenen Dimaguila; Romy Suzara
- Produced by: Charo Santos-Concio; Malou N. Santos
- Starring: Carlo Aquino; Ani Pearl Alonso; Cherry Pie Picache; Ricky Davao; Mahal
- Cinematography: Ben Lobo
- Edited by: Manet Dayrit; Renato de Leon
- Music by: Ding Achacoso; Joseph Olfindo
- Production company: Star Cinema
- Release date: November 26, 1997
- Country: Philippines
- Language: Filipino

Kokey ([ˈkokeɪ]) is a 1997 Filipino science fiction film directed by Romy V. Suzara from a story and screenplay he co-wrote with Jerry Lopez Sineneng, Don Cuaresma, Mari L. Mariano, and Cenen Dimaguila. The film is about an extraterrestrial who had a penchant for befriending human beings.

Produced and distributed by Star Cinema, the film was theatrically released on November 26, 1997.

== Plot ==
On their way home, Bong and Anna discover Kokey, an extraterrestrial whose spaceship explodes upon landing on Earth. Without the knowledge of their parents, the children keep Kokey at home. The three soon become the best of friends with Kokey, who is a big help to the family and their business, attracting customers using his extraterrestrial powers. But Kokey becomes homesick, pointing to the sky in silent tears, missing his parents. He tries to contact them, but with no success. Will he ever be reunited with his family? How long can the children keep Kokey a secret?

== Cast ==
- Carlo Aquino as Bong - the brother of Anna and the kid who witnessed Kokey.
- Ani Pearl Alonzo as Anna - the sister of Bong
- Mahal as Kokey - the alien from another planet
- Ricky Davao as Nanding - the father of Bong and Anna who works on the mine
- Cherry Pie Picache as Trining - the mother of Bong and Anna who is a housewife
- Paquito Diaz as Marcial - the leader of a syndicate who wants to kidnap Kokey
- Nova Villa as Mrs. Querubin - the mother of Bong's friend
- Ernie Zarate as Dr. Perez - a doctor who needs to study about Kokey.
- L.A. Lopez as Ruel
- Danny Labra as Antonio
- Eddie Nicart as Banderas
- King Gutierrez as Boy Pana

== 20th anniversary ==
In 2017, Kokey celebrated its 20th anniversary by being digitally restored and remastered by ABS-CBN Film Restoration.

== See also ==
- Kokey (TV series)
- Kokey at Ako
