= Majika =

2006 Philippine television drama series

- Title card
- Genre: Fantasy drama
- Developed by: R.J. Nuevas
- Written by: Renato Custodio; Suzette Doctolero; Ma. Zita Garganera; Tina Samson-Velasco
- Directed by: Mac Alejandre; Eric Quizon
- Creative director: Jun Lana
- Starring: Angel Locsin; Dennis Trillo
- Theme music composer: Kitchie Nadal
- Opening theme: "Majika" by Kitchie Nadal
- Country of origin: Philippines
- Original language: Tagalog
- No. of episodes: 138

Production
- Executive producers: Angie Castrence; Edlyn Tallada-Abuel
- Producer: Wilma Galvante
- Production locations: Lemery, Batangas, Philippines
- Cinematography: Rhino Vidanes
- Camera setup: Multiple-camera setup
- Running time: 20–43 minutes
- Production company: GMA Entertainment TV

Original release
- Network: GMA Network
- Release: March 20 – September 29, 2006

Majika (transl. magic) is a 2006 Philippine television drama fantasy series broadcast by GMA Network. Directed by Mac Alejandre and Eric Quizon, it stars Angel Locsin and Dennis Trillo. It premiered on March 20, 2006 on the network's Telebabad line up. The series concluded on September 29, 2006, with a total of 138 episodes.

The series is streaming online on YouTube.

== Premise ==
Sabina is the eldest child of Garam and Ayessa, who both fled from Saladin to escape from Balkan, a dark magician. Sabina’s life is shattered when her parents and siblings are abducted and brought to Saladin. She will eventually find her way to Saladin with the help of Eloida and Argo, who will train her into becoming a magician.

== Cast and characters ==
Cast

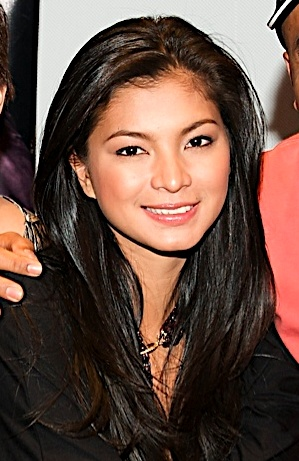
Angel Locsin

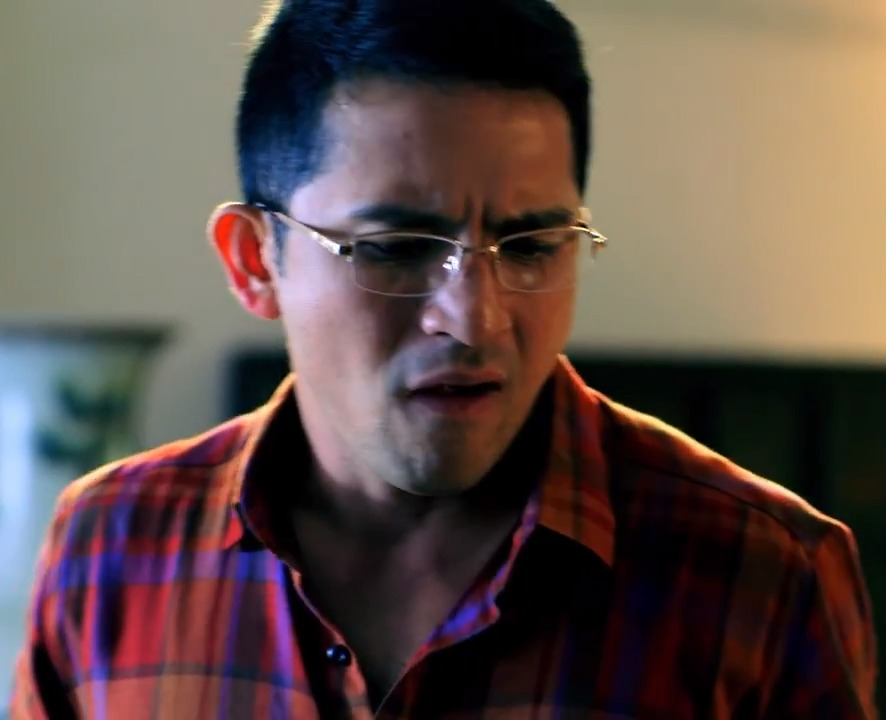
Dennis Trillo

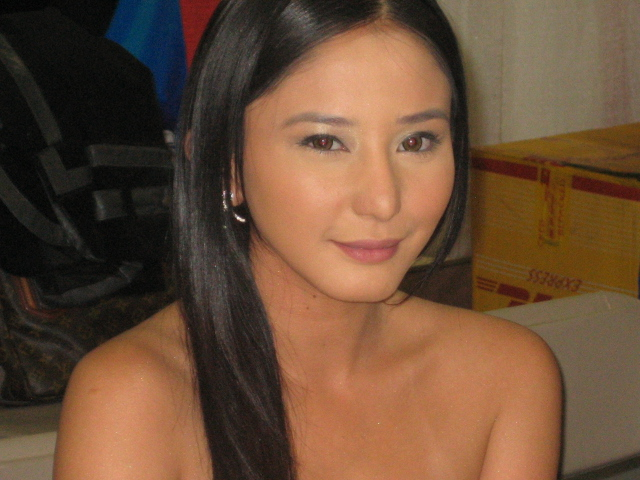
Katrina Halili

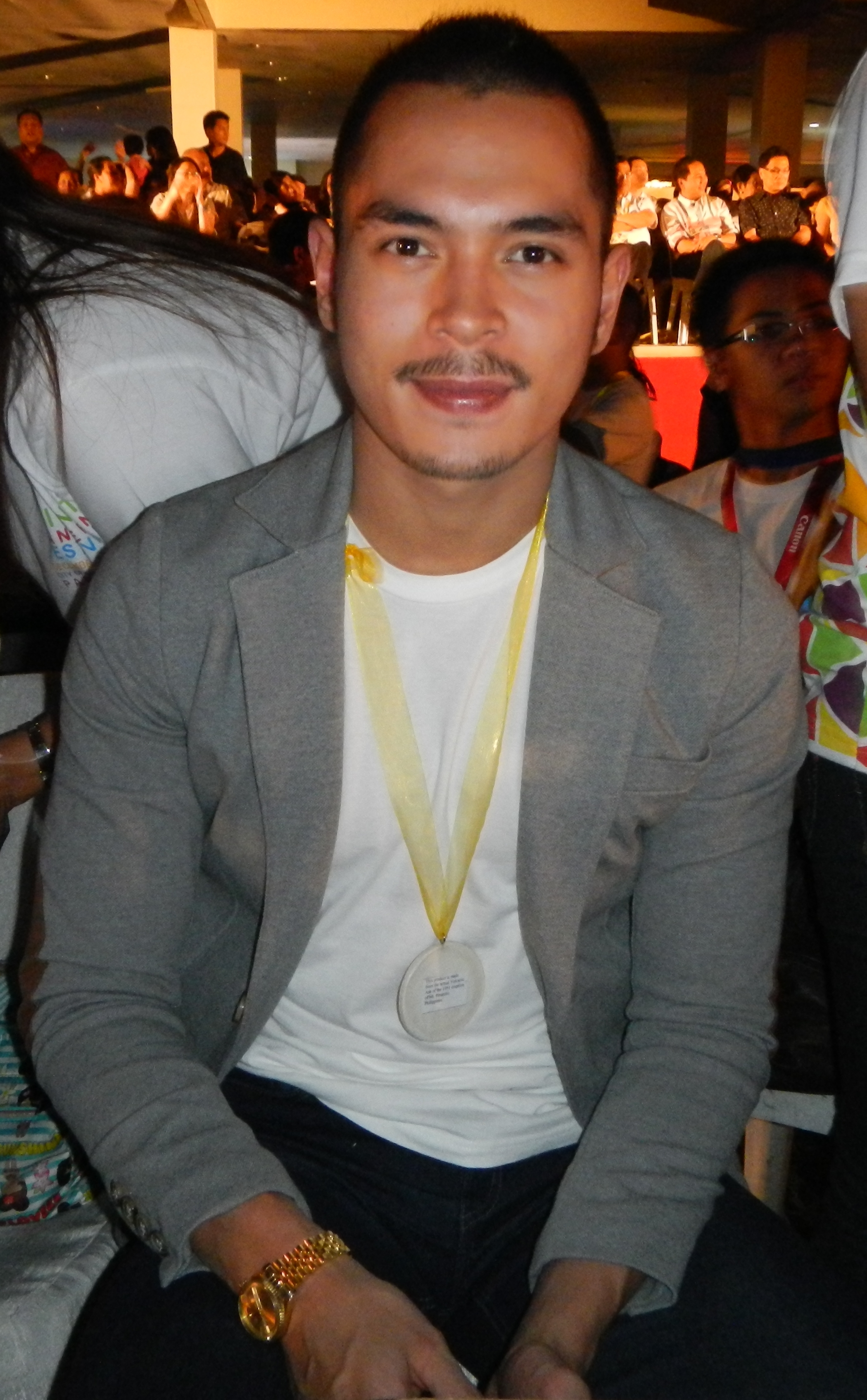
Jake Cuenca

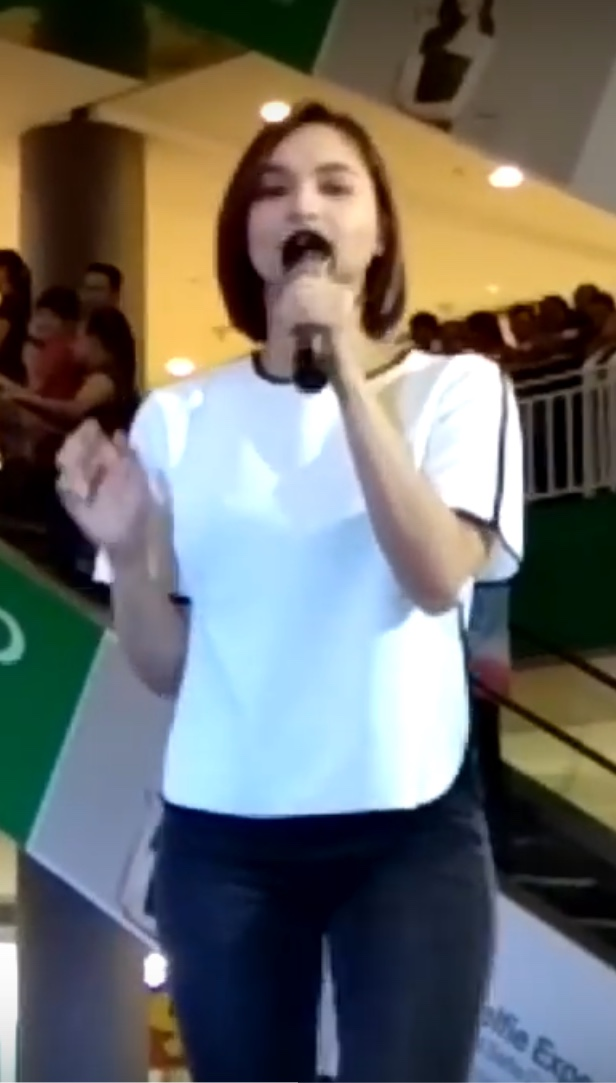
Ryza Cenon

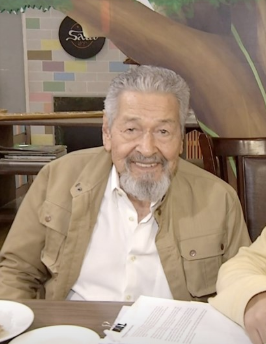
Eddie Garcia

Lead cast

- Angel Locsin as Sabina
- Dennis Trillo as Argo

Supporting cast

- Carmina Villarroel as Ayessa / Linda
- Zoren Legaspi as Garam / Manuel
- Rainier Castillo as Jimboy / Erastus
- Ryza Cenon as Sara / Pria
- Eddie Garcia as Markadan
- Jean Garcia as Eloida
- Katrina Halili as Juno
- Eddie Gutierrez as Balkanin
- Jaime Fabregas as Aduro
- Nanding Josef as Malko
- Spanky Manikan as Carab
- Gabe Mercado as Dibin
- Valerie Concepcion as Naryan
- Sheena Halili as Lyness
- Jade Lopez as Amyla
- Nicole Anderson as Lyjah
- Ehra Madrigal as Vynah
- Nikki Lirag as Salye
- Gina Alajar as Adana
- Polo Ravales as Ebrio
- Bearwin Meily as Bodyal
- Jake Cuenca as Terman
- Gene Padilla as Magil
- Mel Kimura as Besay

Guest cast

- Ella Cruz as younger Sabina
- Miguel Villarreal Aguila as younger Argo
- Renz Juan as younger Juno / Janus
- Miguel Tanfelix as younger Jimboy
- Sandy Talag as younger Sara
- Jodell Stasic as younger Ebrio
- Darryl Lelis as younger Termam
- Dwight Gaston as Orbal
- Viviene Dela Cruz as Sulah
- Mikee Cojuangco-Jaworski as Tamara
- Mura
- Oyo Boy Sotto as Hamir
- Toby Alejar as Larius
- Shamaine Centenera-Buencamino as Losaya
