= Xander Ford =

Filipino internet sensation and influencer

- Born: Marlou Salcedo Arizala; May 11, 1998 (age 28)
- Occupations: Content creator, actor, musician
- Partner: Gena Mago (2021–2024)
- Children: 1
- Musical career
- Genre: Pop
- Years active: 2015–2016
- Formerly of: Hasht5

YouTube information
- Channel: Xander Ford
- Years active: 2017–
- Genre: Vlog
- Subscribers: 90.7 thousand
- Views: 10 million

Marlou Salcedo Arizala (born May 11, 1998), known professionally as Xander Ford, is a Filipino social media personality.

== Early life ==
Marlou Salcedo Arizala was born on May 11, 1998. Growing up in Bacoor, Cavite, Arizala was born to a tricycle father driver while his mother works at an eatery in Manila. His parents separated with his father raising a second family.

He used to work part-time as a cigarette seller to earn money for his school tuition. He pursued a business administration degree but dropped out after a year to help support his family financially.

== Career ==
=== Hasht5 ===
Marlou Arizala was a member of the boy band Hasht5, a boy band parody whose videos became popular in 2015. The name of the group stands for "Have A Successful Honor and Talent" and the "5" refers to its members Arizala, Vincent Binocas, Cee Jhay Ellero, Jhimwell Macanlalay, and Erick Ebreo.

Prior to that, the band Hasht5 experienced online bullying "because of their physical appearance". Arizala was first noticed after a viral video of himself lipsyncing as "papogi".

The group also had guest appearances in Rated K, Gandang Gabi Vice, Luv U, and Kapamilya Deal or No Deal and also performed in ASAP. Arizala left the group in February 2016 to pursue a solo career.

=== As Xander Ford ===
Arizala made public in September 2017 the result of his cosmetic surgery and adopted the screen name, Xander Ford. Reconstructive surgeon Eric Yapjuanco of The Icon Clinic performed the operation on Ford. Ford did not express a preferred appearance only asking the doctor to perform a rhinoplasty on him. He also accepted Yapjuanco's recommendation for a chin augmentation.

On October 1, 2017, Ford made his television appearance with a new look on Rated K which was met by favorable support. Ford also made his television appearance, portraying himself on sitcom program Home Sweetie Home.

However within the same month, a video which showed Ford mocking actress Kathryn Bernardo over her bow-leggedness (Tagalog: sakang) surfaced, which talent agency Star Image Artist initially decried as a black propaganda against Ford and suggested that the man on the video is not Ford. Ford who received negative reactions from KathNiel fans admitted to being the man on the video and was recorded before he adopted the Xander Ford persona. He asked for forgiveness from Bernardo. He filed cyberbullying cases against the two individuals linked to the video believing the scandal negatively affected his career.

Star Image reported that Ford went missing on November 24, 2017, which led to the cancellation of his scheduled appearance at the Higantes Festival and a department store opening ceremony. The next day, Ford denied the reports of his supposed disappearance, explaining that he was taking a break from work and social media. He returned to public life in early 2018.

On April 23, 2019, Star Image announced they imposed an indefinite suspension on Ford and decided to "take back" the Xander Ford name due to his unprofessional behavior. This suspension was later lifted but Star Image announced plans to introduce a "new Xander Ford".

== Personal life ==
On July 17, 2020, Ford came out as bisexual. Ford said he thought himself as heterosexual and had four girlfriends before he met his boyfriend, an influencer who he first befriended in 2018 through chat and met in person the year later.

Ford also had Ysah Cabrejas as his girlfriend. However, in June 2020, Cabrejas accuse Ford of committing rape and physical abuse. Ford was arrested on December 22, 2020, in Pasay on a violence against women complaint. Ford was released from jail after Star Image posted bail for him. In October 2021, Ford said that his former girlfriend decided not to pursue the case against him after a settlement.

By 2022, Ford had another girlfriend named Gena Mago with whom he had a child. Ford announced the end of his three-year relationship with Mago in 2024.

== Filmography ==
=== Film ===
Year	Title	Role	Ref.
2017	Mang Kepweng Returns	Cameo	

=== Television ===
Year	Title	Role	Ref.
	Day Off		
	Home Sweetie Home		
2016	Dolce Amore		
2017	Rated K	Guest	
2022	Family Feud	Contestant	
