= Kokey at Ako =

- Title card
- Genre: Comedy, Drama, Fantasy
- Created by: ABS-CBN Studios; Rondel P. Lindayag
- Based on: Kokey by Romy V. Suzara
- Developed by: ABS-CBN Studios; Laurenti M. Dyogi
- Directed by: Wenn V. Deramas
- Starring: Vhong Navarro; Toni Gonzaga
- Opening theme: "Kokey @ Ako" by Toni Gonzaga, Vhong Navarro, Melai Cantiveros and Jason Francisco
- Composer: Vincent de Jesus
- Country of origin: Philippines
- Original language: Filipino
- No. of episodes: 55

Production
- Executive producers: Carlo Katigbak; Cory Vidanes; Laurenti Dyogi
- Producers: Ellen Nicolas Criste; Roldeo Endrinal; Minnella T. Abad
- Editor: Sidney Zaid Pascua
- Running time: 30 minutes
- Production company: Star Creatives

Original release
- Network: ABS-CBN
- Release: September 20 – December 3, 2010

Related
- Kokey

Kokey at Ako (stylized as Kokey @ Ako, transl. Kokey and Me) is a 2010 Philippine television drama series broadcast by ABS-CBN. The series is sequel to the 2007 TV series Kokey. Directed by Wenn V. Deramas, it stars Toni Gonzaga and Vhong Navarro. It aired on the network's Primetime Bida line up and worldwide on TFC from September 20 to December 3, 2010, replacing Momay and was replaced by Sabel.

== Plot ==
The series follows the alien Kokey and the human reporter Jackie as they work to reunite with their families while the aliens from Planet Kukurikabu plot to exterminate mankind.

== Cast and characters ==
=== Main cast ===
- Toni Gonzaga as Jackie
- Vhong Navarro as Bruce

=== Supporting cast ===
- Gloria Romero as Barbara Reyes
- Melai Cantiveros as Josa Reyes
- Mickey Ferriols as Annie Reyes
- Maricel Laxa-Pangilinan as Dianne Reyes
- Christian Vasquez as Roland Reyes
- Wendy Valdez as Lois Magsanoc
- Mike Lloren as King Cone
- Joy Viado† as Bebot
- Tess Antonio as Babet
- Francis Magundayao/Yulio Pisk as Belat
- Empoy Marquez as Bubot
- Debralis Velasote as Vangie
- DJ Durano as Dr. DJ Caparas
- Candy Pangilinan as Cynthia Caparas
- Bugoy Cariño as Caloy
- Macky Billiones as Niño
- Lyuji Fabular as Caloy's enemy

=== Extended cast ===
- Rubi-Rubi Esmaquel as Fifi
- Jojit Lorenzo as Dick
- Atak Araña as Atak
- Eric Nicolas as Tom
- Simon Ibarra as Jerry
- Minco Fabregas as Tinnio Tan
- Mark Valdez as Antony Precie
- Andre Garcia as Baldo
- Marissa Orillo

=== Special participation ===
- Dennis Padilla as Eduardo "Chong Edong" Reyes
- Nova Villa as Sor Aida Sanchez
- Abby Bautista as young Princess Reyes / Jackie Reyes
- Amy Nobleza as young Josa Reyes
- Frenchie Dy/Kiray Celis (young) as Bam-Bam
- Frances Makil-Ignacio as Toribia
- Johan Santos as Mike
- Tanya Gomez as Linda Magsanoc
- Jairus Aquino as Rolly / Young Roland
- Cheska Billiones as Nena / Young Dianne
- Jewel Crisanto as Ada (Caloy's playmate in the adoption center)
- Marissa Orillo as herself
- Emerson Lee as boarding mate

=== Characters ===
==== Earthlings ====
- Toni Gonzaga/Abby Bautista (young) as Princess Reyes / Jackie Reyes - Jackie is a survivor from a massacre plot against her family, an alien abduction, growing up without parents to provide her needs, and moving on with life with no memory of her real identity. Despite her traumatic past, Jackie is a positive thinker. She is a resourceful and determined news reporter with a special interest in paranormal and extraterrestrial activities. She is obsessed with retracing the events of the past—looking for any leads of alien movements, hoping to find possible indications of her parents’ whereabouts. And that vital lead may be Kokey. The role was originally given to Angel Locsin. Locsin was replaced by Gonzaga due to Locsin's commitment to Imortal.
- Vhong Navarro/ Kyle Balili (young)

- as Bruce Kho Reyes - Bruce used to be the boy who fell in love with the little rich girl with no memory. He is Jackie's best friend, confidante and companion in the search for her missing parents. The hard work and sacrifices he made paid off when his one great love accepted his proposal to be his wife. One day before the wedding, Bruce accepts a news coverage that leads to an unfortunate accident of stellar proportions. Bruce seems to get mad at Bam-Bam (Toribia's Daughter) and helping Jackie and Josa as Bam-Bam teases them.
- as Belat - See: Belat

- Melai Cantiveros/ Amy Nobleza (young) as Josa Reyes - Josa sees and does everything in a different way---odd but funny. She is Bruce's cousin, and Jackie's best friend and pseudo-sister. Her carefree attitude is refreshing, but would often lead to a lot of hilarious misadventures.
- Jason Francisco as Adonis - Adonis had been training as a cameraman for Channel Z for the last six years but can't get a promotion. When Bruce starts working for the station, Adonis becomes one of his good friends. Adonis eventually becomes Josa's love interest.
- Ms. Gloria Romero as Barbara Reyes - Madam Barbra is a sophisticated woman who owns a TV network, Z Broadcasting Company, as well as several companies. Her authority cannot be questioned, but behind her straightforward, stern and unyielding command is a grandmother longing to be reunited with her long-lost son and granddaughter.
- Mickey Ferriols as Annie Reyes - Annie is Barbara's adopted daughter. She is insecure and greedy so she planned to kill Jackie (Princess)'s family. When the years passed, she wants to get the company (Z Broadcasting Company), and she knew that Jackie is Princess. So, she used Lois, to pretend to be Princess Reyes, the long-lost granddaughter of Barbara, but all of her plans didn't work. In the last episode, after a fight with the Reyeses, she was trapped in a glass mirror and dies after the mirror shattered, destroying her in the process.
- Wendy Valdez as Lois Magsanoc - Jackie's rival to the heart of Bruce and she pretended to be Princess Reyes (which Annie planned) because of her ambition to be an actress. When the truth was known that she is not the real Princess because Barbara saw her mother, a crazy one. And instead of being mad, she helped Barbara's family, even Jackie.

==== Yekokans ====
- Kokey - Kokey returns to Planet Earth to find his missing sister before she unwittingly wreaks havoc on mankind. In his search for his furry sibling, Kokey gets to meet new friends and goes into another roller-coaster adventure ride of his life.
- Kekay - Kekay is Kokey's jealous furry little sister. She was born thinking she was disliked and unloved by her parents, and grew up envious over her brother's popularity not only in Planet Yekok but on Earth as well. Her sense of curiosity and misadventure sends her to an accidental journey to Earth.
- Umamay Kakay - Kokey and Kekay's mother.
- Tay Kokoy - Kokey and Kekay's father.

==== Kukurikabukans ====
- Mike Lloren as King Cone - King Cone is the ruthless ruler of planet Kukurikabu. Disobedience of his orders will mean death to any human or exile to outer space for Kukurikabukans.
- Joy Viado as Bebot - One of the three elders of the more than 350 children spawned by King Cone. They are ruthless and heartless as their father; very much enthusiastic in brewing plans to invade other planets, particularly Earth, to call their second home.
- Tess Antonio as Babet - One of the three elders of the more than 350 children spawned by King Cone. They are ruthless and heartless as their father; very much enthusiastic in brewing plans to invade other planets, particularly Earth, to call their second home.
- Francis Magundayao as Belat - Prince Belat is one of the thousands of King Cone's kids. He is affectionate and caring towards the human prisoners of his father, an unthinkable and forbidden behavior for children of royalty. The young prince is most especially attached to Dianne, whom he treated as his mother. Belat's attachment to Dianne drove him to invent a spaceship to send the human couple back to their home planet. As Belat attempts to fly his alien craft to Earth, an accident occurs leaving him trapped in Bruce's body.
- Empoy Marquez as Bubot - One of the three elders of the more than 350 children spawned by King Cone. They are ruthless and heartless as their father; very much enthusiastic in brewing plans to invade other planets, particularly Earth, to call their second home.

== Reception ==
=== Launch ===
Kokey at Ako was postponed three times before it was given an official premiere date. It was originally announced as one of the ABS-CBN's offering for the 60th Celebration of Filipino Soap Opera (Ika-60 taon ng Pinoy Soap Opera), during the ABS-CBN Trade Launch for the first quarter of 2010, entitled Bagong Simula (New Beginning).

However, it was postponed and was launched again as one of the ABS-CBN's offerings for the second quarter of 2010, during the ABS-CBN Trade Launch and was announced during the Kapamilya Trade Launch held in Boracay.

The show was later announced as half-term show line-up by ABS-CBN as part of the 60th Anniversary of Philippines Television and was presented as the station's ID for the rainy season in the Philippines. The trailer premiered on June 26, 2010 on its official website.

== See also ==
- List of Kokey (TV series) episodes
- List of programs broadcast by ABS-CBN
