= Juddha Paolo =

Filipino actor

- Occupations: Actor, Model
- Years active: 2003–2007

Juddha Paolo is a Filipino actor and model.

== Biography ==
Juddha grew up in the United States. He came to the Philippines to join the Philippine amateur boxing team. Instead, he found his way to show business. He became a Star Magic talent. He was launched later under Star Magic Batch 9. He then appeared in Coca-Cola's Hottah Hottah Summer Ad with Paolo Paraiso and Brian Tan.

In 2003, he, along with Paolo Paraiso and Brian Tan, was cast in Tabing Ilog.

He later joined in Studio 23's first VJ search. He was picked along with Kat Alano, Beau Canlas and Ayanna Oliva.

In 2007, he portrayed a small role in Rounin and at the same time appeared in Pinoy Mano-Mano: The Celebrity Boxing Challenge, a boxing reality show featuring celebrities. He had to leave the show due to a joint injury in one of the undercard bouts.

He also works with the ABS-CBN Foundation's "Kapit-Bisig Para Sa Ilog Pasig," a campaign to help rehabilitate the Pasig River.

== Filmography ==
=== Television ===
Year	Title	Role	Notes	Source
1999–2001	Breakfast	Himself/host		
2003	Tabing Ilog	Roy		
2007	Pinoy Mano-Mano: The Celebrity Boxing Challenge	Himself / Contender		
2007	Rounin	Tyro		

=== Film ===
Year	Title	Role	Notes	Source
2003	Mr. Suave	Mr. Clean		
2006	All About Love	Archie		
2006	Pacquiao: The Movie	Singsurat		
