= D' Anothers =

2005 comedy horror film by Joyce E. Bernal

- Theatrical release poster
- Directed by: Joyce E. Bernal
- Screenplay by: Adolfo Alix Jr.; Raymond Lee
- Story by: Adolfo Alix Jr.
- Produced by: Charo Santos-Concio; Malou N. Santos
- Starring: Toni Gonzaga; Vhong Navarro
- Cinematography: Charlie Peralta
- Edited by: Renewin Alano
- Music by: Charles "Chuckie" Dreyfus; Jun Regalado
- Production company: Star Cinema
- Distributed by: ABS-CBN Film Productions
- Release date: July 27, 2005
- Running time: 105 minutes
- Country: Philippines
- Language: Filipino

D' Anothers is a 2005 Filipino comedy horror film directed by Joyce Bernal and written by Adolfo Alix Jr. and Raymond Lee from a story by Alix. The film tells the story of Hesus Resurreccion (Vhong Navarro), the protagonist who is afraid of ghosts, who inherits an abandoned ancestral mansion that has become a residence of ghosts over the past century. For the ghosts, Hesus is "The One", meaning he is the one who will open a portal to the afterlife. It also stars Toni Gonzaga as Maan Tuken, the protagonist's girlfriend, John Prats as JC, a young man who visits the mansion with his love, who is a ghost, and Tado as Atty. Reposo, the protagonist's lawyer.

D' Anothers was released by Star Cinema on July 27, 2005, and was Joyce Bernal's second film as a director, where Vhong Navarro is the lead star, following Mr. Suave (2003) and also the first film where Navarro and Toni Gonzaga (her first film in Star Cinema after transferring to ABS-CBN) teamed up. Throughout its theatrical run, the film became a box-office success.

== Plot ==
The Resurreccion family's ancestral mansion is believed to have a portal to the other world. Every quarter of a century, it must be opened by a chosen member of the clan, known as "The One", to enable stranded ghosts to cross over to the afterlife. With no surviving clan member opening the portal in the past 100 years, ghosts have overcrowded the now-abandoned mansion and are in danger of becoming cockroaches unless they pass over.

Hesus Resurreccion is about to find out that he is The One, but he is afraid of ghosts. When he inherits the mansion, he wants to sell it immediately, but finds difficulties since people believe the mansion is haunted. He freaks out when he learns that the people he sees in the mansion are all ghosts. Hesus has no choice but to fulfill his mission as The One. As he spends more time with the ghosts, he realizes that they are not scary at all and even enjoys their company.

In the end, Hesus gets the key and opens the portal, but is later haunted by new ghosts who show up at the mansion.

== Cast ==
=== Main cast ===
- Toni Gonzaga as Maan Tuken, Hesus's sympathetic girlfriend.
- Vhong Navarro as Hesus Resurrecion, a cowardly young man who is very scared of ghosts.

=== Supporting cast ===
- John Prats as JC
- Jhong Hilario as Gorio
- Dominic Ochoa as Nick
- Roxanne Guinoo as Titay
- Neri Naig as Rachelle
- Michelle Madrigal as Mayumi
- Joross Gamboa as Xavier
- Mura as Vic
- Pokwang as Valat
- Jaime Fabregas as Padre Florentino
- Jill Yulo as Angelica
- Arlene Muhlach as Kimberly, Hesus' social-climbing aunt
- Archie Alemania as Jograd, one of Hesus' two rowdy cousins
- Tado as Atty. Reposo, Hesus Resurrecion's lawyer
- Bella Flores as Precious, an elderly woman who owns a sari-sari store near the mansion
- Pinky Amador as Mrs. Tuken, Maan's mother who dislikes Hesus as her daughter's boyfriend
- Dennis Padilla as Mr. Resurrecion
- Marjorie Barretto as Mrs. Resurrecion
- Mosang as Lotus Feet, originated from Feng Shui
- Jojit Lorenzo as George, Hesus' co-worker
- Piolo Pascual as himself
- Rufa Mae Quinto as a ghost
- Bidz Dela Cruz as Badet the Buyer, the man who decides to buy the mansion but dies after completing the deal
- Sarita Perez de Tagle

== Production ==
=== Casting ===
D'Anothers served as the first film of Toni Gonzaga under Star Cinema after she was transferred to ABS-CBN from rival GMA Network in the same year as the film's release. Aside from Gonzaga, it is also the first film for Roxanne Guinoo, Neri Naig, Michelle Madrigal, and Joross Gamboa, all of them are newly-discovered talents from the network's talent competition program Star Circle Quest (SCQ).

For Pokwang, who played the role of Valat, the film served as her first comedy horror film that she starred in and also, her second film under the film studio.

== Release ==
D'Anothers was produced and distributed by Star Cinema, and it was released in more than 100 cinemas nationwide on July 27, 2005.

The film received an international premiere at the 8th Far East Film Festival in Udine, Italy on April 21, 2006.

== Reception ==
=== Box office ===
According to the report from the staff of the film studio, the film earned ₱10 million on its first day of theatrical showing. On the third week of its theatrical run, the film has reached its ₱100 million-mark in the box-office, marking itself as a "blockbuster".

== See also ==
- List of ghost films
- Star Cinema
