= Vhong Navarro =

Filipino actor, comedian and singer (born 1977)

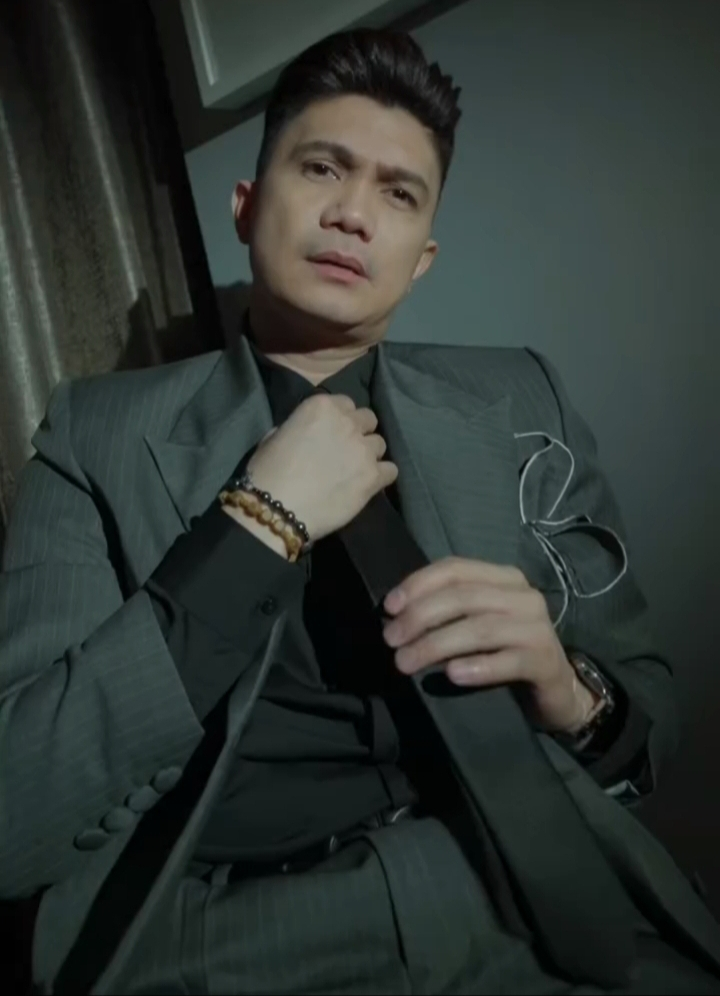
- Navarro at ABS-CBN Ball 2023
- Born: Ferdinand Hipolito Navarro; January 4, 1977 (age 49); Makati, Metro Manila, Philippines
- Occupations: Comedian; actor; dancer; recording artist; television host
- Years active: 1992–present
- Agent: ABS-CBN
- Spouses: Bianca Lapus (m. 1998; ann. 2008) Tanya Bautista (m. 2019)
- Children: 2

Ferdinand Hipolito "Vhong" Navarro (born January 4, 1977) is a Filipino comedian, actor, dancer, recording artist, and television host. He is known for his comedic performances in films such as Mr. Suave (2003), Gagamboy (2004), and Agent X44 (2007).

Navarro began his entertainment career in 1993 upon being recruited at the age of 16 for the dance group Streetboys by filmmaker Chito S. Roño; among his fellow members was Jhong Hilario. He and Hilario currently serve as regular hosts for ABS-CBN's noontime variety show It's Showtime. As a recording artist, he has released three studio albums.

== Early life ==
Vhong Navarro was born as Ferdinand Hipolito Navarro in Makati on January 4, 1977. He dreamed to be a professional dancer and started as a member of the dance group Streetboys, organized by director Chito Roño before starting his career in comedy.

== Career ==
=== Streetboys ===
In 1993, Navarro auditioned to become a member of Streetboys, a dance group formed by filmmaker Chito S. Roño. In 1996, Navarro and other members of Streetboys starred in Roño's comedy film Istokwa.

=== Film career ===
Navarro became a star in the film Mr. Suave, a parody of the Parokya ni Edgar song of the same name. Navarro started to gain recognition for his acting skills when he appeared in the film No Other Woman in 2011. He has since then starred in a number of films such as The Amazing Praybeyt Benjamin (2014), Extra Service (2017), and Haunted Forest (2017). He has also appeared in several television shows like It's Showtime (2009–present), Wansapanataym (2010–2018), Home Sweetie Home (2014–2017), and Banana Split (2008–2010).

Navarro has received several awards throughout his career including the Gawad Urian Award for Best Actor in 2014 for his role in the film The Amazing Praybeyt Benjamin. He was also named Best Male TV Host by the PMPC Star Awards for Television in 2015.

=== Music career ===
Navarro started his music career in 2002 when he released his first self-titled album under Viva Records. He followed up with two more albums in 2003 and 2004 titled Ready Ka Na Ba? and Pinoy Ako. Both albums were well received by Filipino audiences. Aside from his solo albums, he has also collaborated with other artists such as Anne Curtis, Vice Ganda, Billy Crawford, and Yassi Pressman.

== Personal life ==
=== Family ===
At the age of 19, Navarro became a father of Frederick from a non-showbiz girl. Navarro was previously married to Lalaine Bianca Lapus; their marriage was annulled in 2008. They have a son named Isaiah. Despite their separation, Navarro maintains an amicable relationship with Lapus. In 2022, the family attended the graduation of their son Isaiah from the University of Santo Tomas (UST), where he earned a degree from the Faculty of Arts and Letters. Navarro's firstborn son Frederick, is also a graduate of UST in Information Technology now working as an IT specialist. In 2019, Navarro and Tanya Winona Bautista were married in Kyoto, Japan.

=== Assault incident/Deniece Cornejo Case ===
On January 22, 2014, Navarro was attacked and severely beaten by a group of men inside his female friend Deniece Cornejo's condominium unit at Forbeswood Heights in Bonifacio Global City, Taguig. His manager, Chito S. Roño, said Navarro was invited by Cornejo to visit her condominium unit, where he was tied up and blindfolded by several men, threatened and then beaten up. The perpetrator was identified as Cedric Lee, who was also accompanied by several other men during the time of the incident. Following this, it was stated that Navarro would temporarily not be appearing on It's Showtime and other television projects while he continues to recover. Lawyer Alma Fernandez-Mallonga served as Navarro's legal counsel, while Howard Calleja served as Cornejo's counsel.

Navarro was accused of attempted rape, which he denied. In an interview with TV host Boy Abunda on Buzz ng Bayan, Navarro said he just arrived at the model's condo unit and then suddenly there were armed men that beat him up. On January 29, 2014, one week after the incident, Cornejo filed a rape case against Navarro, but the National Bureau of Investigation said it was unlikely that there was an attempted rape on Cornejo, based on the CCTV elevator footage, in which Cornejo was seen exiting the building only a minute after Navarro's arrival. Navarro maintained that it was physically impossible for rape or attempted rape to have occurred in such a short time.

On February 19, 2014, another rape case was filed against Navarro, by a woman named Roxanne Cabañero, alleging the rape took place in 2010. Cabañero's case was dismissed in October 2014 due to insufficient evidence, with a statement from the Department of Justice saying Cabanero's story was "contradictory, suspicious, and of doubtful nature."

On March 8, 2014, Navarro returned to It's Showtime.

On April 10, 2014, DOJ dismissed the rape complaint filed by Deniece Cornejo against Navarro. A week later, DOJ issued a warrant of arrest against Cornejo and Lee. On April 26, Lee and his accomplice were captured and arrested in Oras, Eastern Samar. On May 5, Cornejo surrendered to Camp Crame.

On September 16, 2014, the Taguig court set a ₱500,000 bail for Lee, Raz and Cornejo.

On January 25, 2015, businessman Ferdinand Guerrero was arrested by agents of the National Bureau of Investigation (NBI) inside the penthouse of Ritz condominium in Makati as one of the suspects.

On July 21, 2022, the Court of Appeals' 14 Division reversed the DOJ's decision to dismiss Cornejo's complaint.

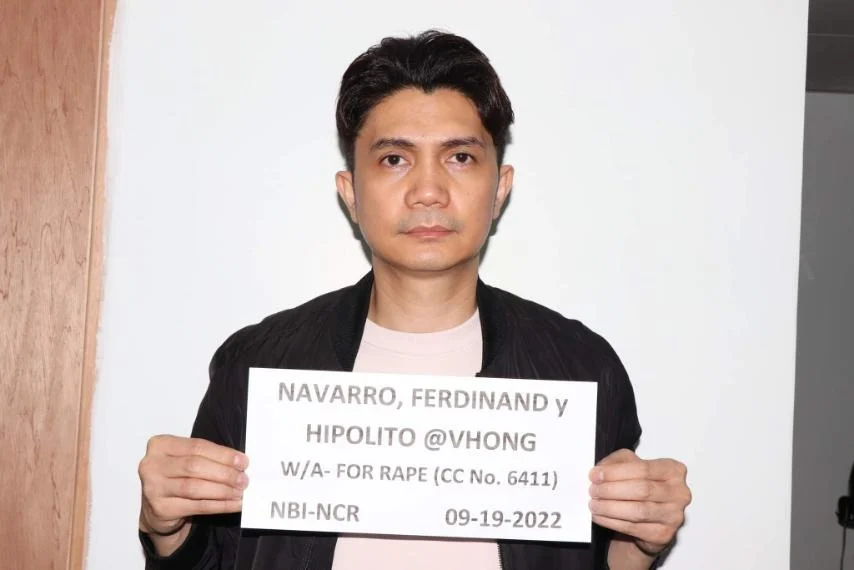
Navarro's mug shot after he surrendered to the NBI on September 19, 2022

On September 19, 2022, the Taguig Court issued an arrest warrant against Navarro 8 years after the incident happened. He surrendered to the NBI on the same day.

On September 19, 2022, Navarro surrendered to the National Bureau of Investigation (NBI) after trial courts in Taguig issued him separate warrants for rape and "acts of lasciviousness" committed against Deniece Cornejo in 2014. Prosecutors said that the rape and molestations occurred at the hotel where Navarro was also falsely imprisoned and beaten by Cedric Lee and his accomplices as a result; the extent of his injuries made headlines at the time, and his assailants were eventually convicted. Navarro has maintained he did not rape Cornejo, claiming the pair did not engage in any sexual activity; and that Cornejo, Lee and his companions were seeking to extort him for financial gain.

On November 17, 2022, the NBI received orders from the Taguig city court to transfer Navarro to a Bureau of Jail Management and Penology (BJMP) facility in Camp Bagong Diwa while pending the resolution of his petition for bail.

On December 6, 2022, the court allowed Navarro to post ₱1 million (roughly US$18,000) bail.

On January 12, 2023, the court denied Cornejo's appeal to cancel Navarro's bail. In March 2023, the Philippine Supreme Court dismissed the charges due to lack of probable cause as well as noted what they considered to be material inconsistencies in complainant Deniece Cornejo's complaint-affidavits concerning one of the elements of the crime charged in the indictment.

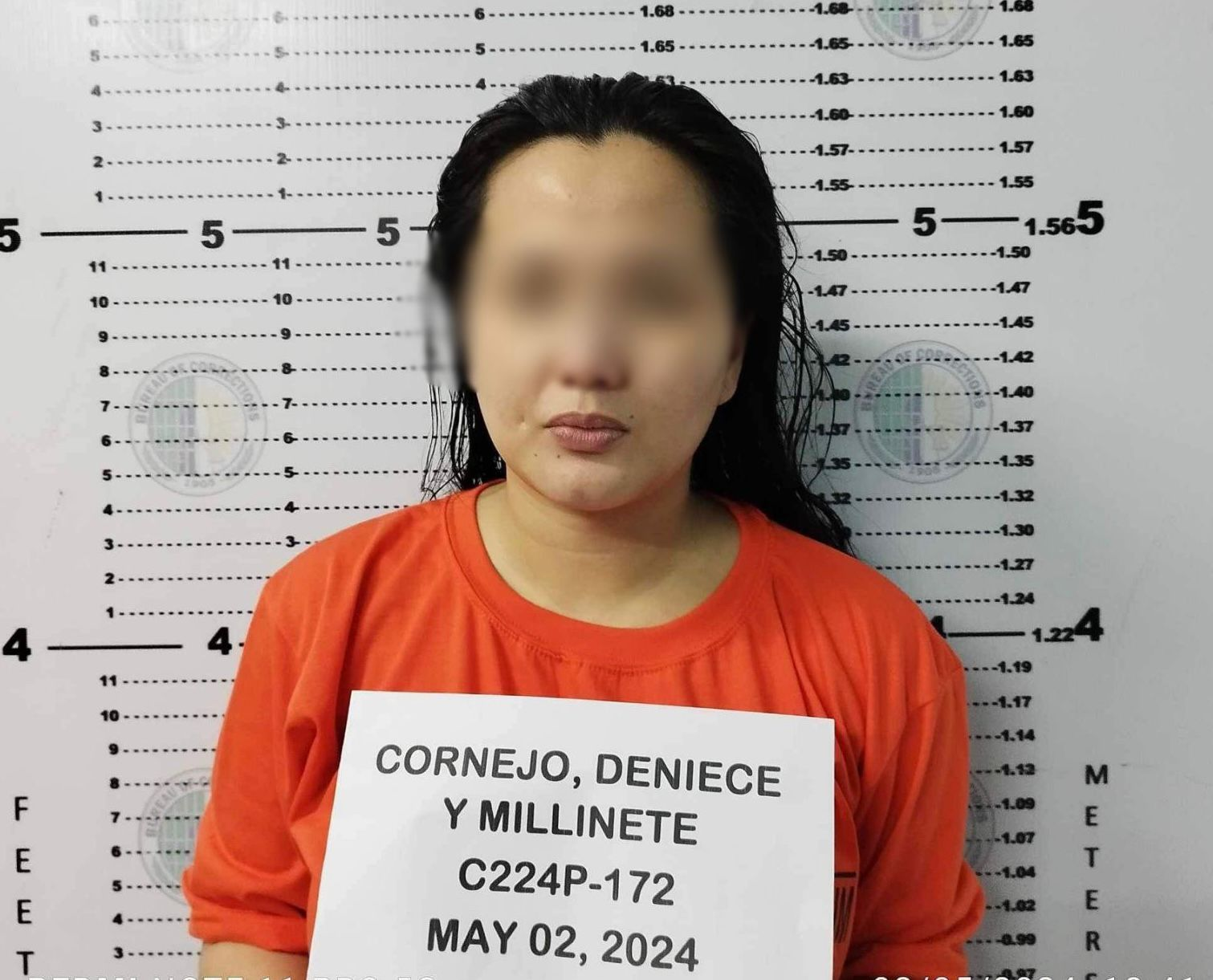
Cornejo (May 2, 2024)

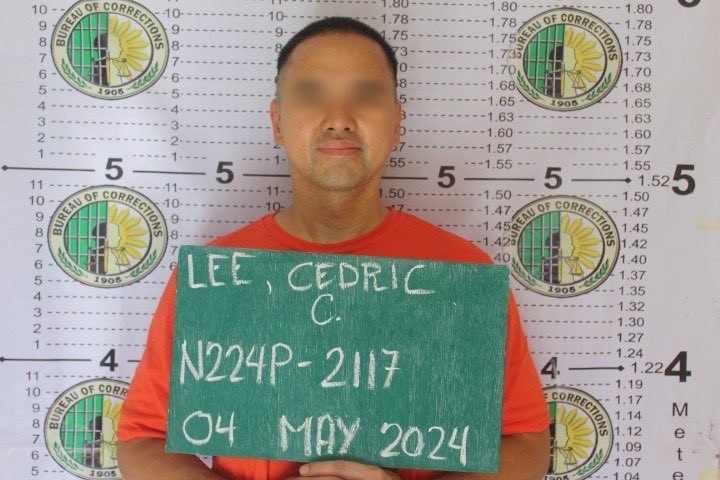
Lee (May 4, 2024)

Mugshots of Deniece Cornejo and Cedric Lee following their conviction

On May 2, 2024, the Taguig City Regional Trial Court, Branch 153, Presiding Judge Mariam G. Bien, in a 94-page judgment sentenced Cedric Lee, Denice Cornejo, Ferdinand Guerrero, and Simeon Palma Raz to reclusión perpetua, in the 2014 case for serious illegal detention (Article 267, Revised Penal Code), extortion and assault of Navarro. The accused were ordered to pay jointly and severally ₱100,000 civil indemnity, ₱100,000 moral damages and ₱100,000 punitive damages. The court further canceled the bail bond of the accused. Raz and Cornejo, who were present at the promulgation of the decision, and were committed by the court.

Cedric Lee surrendered with the National Bureau of Investigation in Mandaluyong and later transferred to Quezon City, Director Menardo de Lemos confirmed. Lee will be held in a prison outside of the Bilibid Prison, said Gregorio Catapang Jr. Deniece Millinete Cornejo and mixed martial arts fighter Simeon Palma Raz will be under the NBP Reception and Diagnostic Center procedures, such as a 5-days Quarantine Cell stay and 55-day medical diagnosis. Cornejo will finally be held at the Mandaluyong Correctional Institution for Women. On May 16, 2024, Ferdinand Guerrero surrendered to the NBI and was detained at the Bureau of Corrections' Quarantine Cell.

== Discography ==
=== Studio albums ===
- Totoy Bibbo (2004)
- Don Romantiko (2005)
- Chickboy (2007)
- Let's Dance (2008)

=== Compilation albums ===
- Best Novelty Hits (2008)

=== Songs/music videos ===
- "Hari ng Dance Floor" (It's Showtime the Album)
- "Mr. Papabol" (I Star 15 album)
- "Ayos Na Ang Buto-Buto"
- "Cha Cha Cha"
- "Chickboy" (from the film Agent X44)
- "Don Romantiko" (from the film D' Anothers)
- "Huwag Kang Makulit" (from the TV series Kulilits)
- "Magandang Umaga"
- "Minahal Kita" (featuring Gloc-9)
- "Pata-Pata-Pon" (featuring Streetboys)
- "Pamela" (from the film Otso-Otso, Pamela-Mela Wan)
- "Supah Papalicious Man" (from the film Supah Papahlicious)
- "Totoy Bibbo"
- "Da Vhong Song" (from the film Da Possessed)

== Filmography ==
=== Film ===
Year	Title	Role	Notes
1994	Minsan Lang Kitang Iibigin	Streetboys	
1994	Separada	Streetboys	
1996	Istokwa	Macky	
1998	Labs Kita, Okey Ka Lang?	Jason	
2000	Tugatog	Monset	
2000	Daddy O, Baby O!	Benny	
2000	Anghel dela Guardia	Raphael	
2000	Spirit Warriors	Thor	
2001	Ooops, Teka Lang... Diskarte Ko 'To!	Dencio	
2001	Banyo Queen	Pating	
2002	May Pag-ibig Pa Kaya?	Lesther	
2002	Got 2 Believe	Rudolph	
2002	Cass & Cary: Who Wants to Be a Billionaire?	Cary	
2002	Jologs	Kulas	
2003	Spirit Warriors: The Shortcut	Thor	
2003	Keka	Bhong	
2003	Pinay Pie	Butch	
2003	Asboobs: Asal Bobo	Kitoy	
2003	Utang ng Ama	Babaero	
2003	Mr. Suave	Rico Suave	
2003	Gagamboy	Junie / Gagamboy	
2004	Otso-Otso Pamela-Mela Wan	Amboy / Dao	
2005	D' Anothers	Hesus Resurrection	
2007	Agent X44	Reserve Agent King Agila / Agent X44	
2008	Supahpapalicious	Adonis / Dodong / Tita Barbara / Lola Paulina / Apl Dayap	
2008	My Only Ü	Bonganvilla/Bong	
2009	Astig	Real Estate Buyer	
2009	Kimmy Dora: Kambal sa Kiyeme		Cameo
2010	RPG Metanoia	Cel / Sargo	Voice role
2011	Bulong	Conan	
2012	Shake, Rattle and Roll Fourteen: The Invasion	Hank	
2014	Starting Over Again		Cameo
2014	Da Possessed	Ramoncito "Ramon" Villamayor	
2014	Moron 5.2: The Transformation		Cameo
2015	Buy Now, Die Later	Odie	
2017	Mang Kepweng Returns	Kieffer Rivera/Mang Kepweng	
2017	Woke Up Like This	Nando Cruz; Sabrina Rodriguez	
2018	Unli Life	Benedict Panganiban	
2020	I'm in Love with My Asylum		
2020	Mang Kepweng: Ang Lihim ng Bandanang Itim	Kieffer Rivera/Mang Kepweng	
2025	Child No. 82: Anak ni Boy Kana	Maximo "Boy Kana" Maniego Sr.	

=== Television ===
Year	Title	Role	Notes
1992	Home Along Da Riles	Hurculies	
1996–1999	Super Laff-In	Himself (host)	
1996–present	ASAP	Himself (performer)	
1997	Spice Boys	Himself (host)	
1999–2001	Pwedeng Pwede	Samson	
2001	Wansapanataym: Tiquio, Tiquio in the Cue Ball	Joe the Master	
2001	Whattamen	Elton	
2003	Wansapanataym: Lampaeng	Paeng	
2003	Wazzup Wazzup	Himself (host)	
2003	Bida si Mister, Bida si Misis	Bok Tyson	
2004	Pirated CD (Celebrity Disguise)	Himself (host)	
2004	MTB Ang Saya Saya	Himself (host)	
2004	Yes, Yes Show!	Himself (host)	
2006	Gudtaym	Himself (host)	
2006	Komiks Presents: Da Adventures of Pedro Penduko	Gary	
2006	Love Spell: Pasko Na Santa Ko	Donato	
2007	Mars Ravelo's Lastikman	Eskappar / Miguel Asis / Lastikman	
2008	I am KC: Love to Dance	Eman	
2008	I Love Betty La Fea	Nicholas "Kulas" Moro	
2008	Pilipinas, Game KNB?	Himself (guest host)	
2008	My Myx	Himself (Celebrity VJ)	
2008	Myx Backtrax	Himself (Celebrity VJ)	
2008	Myxilog	Himself (Celebrity VJ)	
2008	Pop Myx	Himself (Celebrity VJ)	
2009	May Bukas Pa	Moy	
2009	George and Cecil		Guest appearance
2009–present	It's Showtime	Himself (host)	
2010	Magpasikat	Himself (host)	
2010	Wowowee	Himself (host)	
2010	Kokey @ Ako	Bruce Kho Reyes / Belat	
2011	100 Days to Heaven	Elpidio "Pido" Abucay	
2011–2013	Toda Max	Justin Bibbo	
2014	Home Sweetie Home	Jerome	
2014	Wansapanataym: Nato De Coco	Oscar "Oca" Palmera	
2015	Dance Kids	Judge	
2017	Minute to Win It: Last Man Standing	Himself (player)	
2019–2020	Home Sweetie Home: Extra Sweet	Ferdinand "Ferdie" Bustamante	
2019–2020	Your Moment	Himself (host)	
2021	Your Face Sounds Familiar (season 3)	Himself (guest)	
2024	Family Feud (4th incarnation)	Himself (player)	
2025	Incognito	Gaspar	
2025	Your Face Sounds Familiar (season 4)	Himself (host)	

=== Music videos ===
Year	Title	Credit
2026	Unang Kilig (with Bini)	Himself

== Awards and nominations ==
Award	Year (Note: Indicates the year of ceremony. Each year is linked to the article about the awards held that year, wherever possible.)	Nominee / Work	Category	Result	Ref.
Anak TV Seal Awards	2010	Vhong Navarro	Makabata Star	Won	
Anak TV Seal Awards	2012	Vhong Navarro	Makabata Star	Won	
Anak TV Seal Awards	2014	Vhong Navarro	Makabata Star	Won	
Anak TV Seal Awards	2015	Vhong Navarro	Makabata Star	Won	
Anak TV Seal Awards	2016	Vhong Navarro	Makabata Star	Won	
ASAP Pop Viewers' Choice Awards	2007	"Chickboy"	Pop Movie Theme Song of the Year	Nominated	
ASAP Pop Viewers' Choice Awards	2007	Agent X44	Pop Screen Kiss (Shared with Pokwang.)	Nominated	
ASAP Pop Viewers' Choice Awards	2010	Vhong Navarro	Pop Male Fashionista	Nominated	
ASAP Pop Viewers' Choice Awards	2011	Vhong Navarro	Pop Male Fashionista	Nominated	
ASAP Pop Viewers' Choice Awards	2013	Vhong Navarro	Pop Male Fashionista	Nominated	
ASAP Pop Viewers' Choice Awards	2014	Vhong Navarro	Pop Male Fashionista	Nominated	
Awit Awards	2009	"Ayos Na ang Buto-Buto"	Best Novelty Recording	Nominated	
Awit Awards	2011	"Mr. Papabol"	Best Novelty Recording	Nominated	
Gawad Urian Awards	2003	Jologs	Best Actor	Nominated	
Golden Laurel Lyceans' Choice Media Awards	2022	It's Showtime	Best Variety Show Host/s (Shared with It's Showtime hosts.)	Won	
Golden Screen TV Awards	2013	Toda Max	Outstanding Performance by an Actor in a Gag or Comedy Program	Nominated	
Golden Screen TV Awards	2014	Toda Max	Outstanding Performance by an Actor in a Gag or Comedy Program	Nominated	
Golden Screen TV Awards	2014	It's Showtime	Outstanding Male Host in a Musical or Variety Program	Nominated	
Golden Screen TV Awards	2015	It's Showtime	Outstanding Male Host in a Musical or Variety Program	Nominated	
Jeepney TV Fan Favorite Awards	2022	It's Showtime	Favorite Musical/Variety Show Host	Nominated	
PMPC Star Awards for Movies	2009	"Chickboy"	Movie Theme Song of the Year	Nominated	
PMPC Star Awards for Television	2004	Bida si Mister, Bida si Misis	Best Comedy Actor	Nominated	
PMPC Star Awards for Television	2010	Showtime	Best Talent Search Program Hosts (Shared with Showtime hosts.)	Nominated	
PMPC Star Awards for Television	2011	Showtime	Best Talent Search Program Hosts (Shared with Showtime hosts.)	Nominated	
PMPC Star Awards for Television	2012	Toda Max	Best Comedy Actor	Nominated	
PMPC Star Awards for Television	2012	It's Showtime	Best Reality/Game Show Host (Shared with It's Showtime hosts.)	Won	
PMPC Star Awards for Television	2013	Toda Max	Best Comedy Actor	Nominated	
PMPC Star Awards for Television	2013	It's Showtime	Best Male TV Host	Nominated	
PMPC Star Awards for Television	2018	It's Showtime	Best Male TV Host	Nominated	
PMPC Star Awards for Television	2019	Home Sweetie Home: Extra Sweet	Best Comedy Actor	Nominated	
PMPC Star Awards for Television	2021	Home Sweetie Home: Extra Sweet	Best Comedy Actor	Nominated	
Push Awards	2015	Vhong Navarro	Push Tweet Most Loved Male Celebrity	Nominated	
Push Awards	2015	Vhong Navarro	Push Gram Most Popular Male Celebrity	Nominated	
Push Awards	2019	It's Showtime	Push Dance Performance of the Year	Nominated	
Push Awards	2020	Vhong Navarro	Push Happiness Ambassador	Nominated	
Push Awards	2020	Love Shot	Push Dance Cover of the Year	Won	
Rawr Awards	2015	Vhong Navarro	Fashionable Celebrity of the Year	Nominated	
Rawr Awards	2017	Vhong Navarro	Pak Na Pak Na Comedian	Nominated	
Rawr Awards	2018	Vhong Navarro	Pak Na Pak Na Comedian	Nominated	
Sine Sandaan: Celebrating the Luminaries of Philippine Cinema	2019	Vhong Navarro	Male Comedian ng Sentenaryo	Included	
Yahoo OMG! Celebrity Awards	2011	Vhong Navarro	Funniest Comedian	Nominated	
Yahoo OMG! Celebrity Awards	2012	Vhong Navarro	Comedian of the Year	Nominated	
Yahoo OMG! Celebrity Awards	2013	It's Showtime	Male TV Host of the Year	Nominated	
Yahoo OMG! Celebrity Awards	2014	It's Showtime	Male TV Host of the Year	Won	
