= Kokey (TV series) =

- Title card
- Genre: Sci-fi, Drama, Fantasy, Musical
- Created by: ABS-CBN Studios
- Based on: Kokey by Romy Suzara
- Directed by: Wenn V. Deramas; Ruel S. Bayani
- Music by: Vince De Jesus
- Ending theme: "Kokey" by Joshua Cadeliña
- Country of origin: Philippines
- Original language: Tagalog
- No. of episodes: 70

Production
- Executive producer: Brenda Lee Estopacio
- Running time: 45 minutes
- Production company: Star Creatives

Original release
- Network: ABS-CBN
- Release: August 6 – November 9, 2007

Related
- Kokey at Ako

Kokey is a 2007 Philippine television drama broadcast by ABS-CBN. The series is based on the 1997 film of the same title. Directed by Wenn V. Deramas and Ruel S. Bayani, it stars Joshua Cadeliña, Julia Barretto, Ruffa Gutierrez, Redford White, Eugene Domingo, Rhap Salazar, Nova Villa, Joji Lorenzo, Boots Anson-Roa, Mylene Dizon and Ryan Eigenmann. It aired on the network's Primetime Bida line up and worldwide on TFC from August 6 to November 9, 2007, replacing Which Star Are You From and was replaced by Princess Sarah.

== Overview ==
=== Film ===
The first Kokey encounter happened twenty years ago. It was in 1997 when we were first introduced to the cute alien who had a penchant for befriending human beings. And his best friend then was the pre-pubescent Carlo Aquino in the movie entitled Kokey. It was directed by the same man who brought Cedie and Sarah, Ang Munting Prinsesa to the big screen---Romy Suzara.

== Plot ==
An alien named Kokey from the planet Yekok had crash-landed on Earth in his ship. He eventually befriends a young orphan named Bong, and he helps Kokey to fix his ship so that he could return to planet Yekok. Kokey also befriends other people - Anna, the sister of Bong, Abie, an aspiring pilot who helped build Kokey's ship, and Peping. Meanwhile, Kokey's enemy, Korokoy, followed him to Earth in order to find a crystal which Kokey values the most. Bong, Anna, Abie & Peping must help Kokey to find the lost crystal, fix his ship in time, and defeat Korokoy. One night, as Kokey & the others were sleeping on a leaf (on their many adventures, they shrank at one point), Bong stayed awake & looked up at the sky, thinking sadly about his friend Kokey & what his life would look like without him (when he leaves for planet Yekok in the distant future). After singing a quite sad song about Kokey, he finally drifts off to sleep. The next day, they continue their search for the crystal. They encountered many mysteries & many problems they had to solve, but eventually they found the crystal & defeated Korokoy. Kokey's mother, Kakay, soon went to Earth to help her son. It turns out that Kokey's father, Kokoy, & Korokoy were enemies too. When they had found the crystal & defeated Korokoy, he said his final words: "I shall come back again!". Then Kokey & Kakay went off to Yekok in their spaceship. Once they were high in the night sky, his mother asked him, "Where's the crystal?" Then Kokey looked around & was alarmed to find out that he left the crystal with Bong! When his mother found out, they both cried, "AAAAAAAAAH!" as the spaceship flew away.

== Cast and characters ==
=== Main cast ===
- Joshua Cadeliña as Bong
- Julia Barretto as Anna
- Ruffa Gutierrez as Trining
- Redford White as Nanding
- Eugene Domingo as Charisse
- Rhap Salazar as Jimboy
- Nova Villa as Sor. Aida
- Joji Lorenzo as Marcial
- Boots Anson-Roa as Doña Ingrid
- Mylene Dizon as Myra
- Ryan Eigenmann as Nicassio / Korokoy
- Zanjoe Marudo as Abi
- Megan Young as Shane
- Quintin Alianza as Peping

=== Special participation ===
- Sid Lucero as Isidro
- DJ Durano as Dr. DJ
- Jenny Miller as Divina
- Francis Magundayao as Elias
- Vice Ganda as Lyka Horse

== Sequel ==
On ABS-CBN's Trade Launch for its then-upcoming shows for 2009, a preview was shown for the sequel with the title, "Kokey Returns". In November 2009, Kokey was included in the 21st Advertising Congress as ABS-CBN's then-upcoming 2010 programs. The sequel was retitled Kokey at Ako.

== See also ==
- List of programs broadcast by ABS-CBN
- List of ABS-CBN Studios original drama series
