= Da Possessed =

2014 Filipino horror comedy film

- Da Possessed theatrical movie poster
- Directed by: Bb. Joyce Bernal
- Screenplay by: Athena Aringo-Yenko; Ays De Guzman; Antoinette Jadaone; Kriz G. Gazmen (additional dialogue)
- Story by: Athena Aringo-Yenko; Ays de Guzman
- Produced by: Elma S. Medua (supervising); John Paul E. Abellera (creative)
- Starring: Vhong Navarro; Solenn Heussaff; Joey Marquez; John Lapus; Empoy Marquez; Smokey Manaloto; Matet de Leon; Beverly Salviejo; Joy Viado; Aaliyah Belmoro
- Cinematography: Charlie Peralta
- Edited by: Marya Ignacio; Joyce Bernal
- Music by: Carmina Cuya
- Production companies: Star Cinema; Regal Entertainment
- Distributed by: Star Cinema; Regal Entertainment
- Release dates: April 19, 2014 (Philippines); April 25, 2014 (Guam); April 26, 2014 (Europe)
- Running time: 120 minutes
- Country: Philippines
- Language: Filipino
- Box office: ₱122 million

Da Possessed is a 2014 Filipino horror comedy film directed by Joyce Bernal and starring Vhong Navarro and Solenn Heussaff. The film, produced and distributed by Star Cinema officially premiered in the Philippines on April 19, 2014. It is a remake of the Indian Tamil-language film Muni 2: Kanchana.

The film earned ₱17 million on its opening day on Black Saturday.

== Plot ==
Many years ago, 3 circus landowners are killed after they refused to sell their land and are buried on that same lot.

In the present, the mother-reliant and weakling Ramon is forced to work as a landscape artist to pay off their family's debt. In his field, he meets the lovable femme fatale boss Anna, who he falls in love head over heels with. Working hard as he tries to impress, Ramon unknowingly digs the graveyard of the three circus owners whose souls begin to haunt and possess Ramon's body for vengeance; thus ruining his courtship and eventual relationship with Anna.

Meanwhile, to prove the purest of his intentions, Ramon needs to stand up for Anna against her father Don Demetrio, who is a syndicate leader. But because of Ramon's cowardice, this comes as a major challenge, on top of the disturbance brought by the three ghosts headed by Anastacio "Chemerut" Balbitero, Jr. As Ramon tries to solve the mystery behind these hauntings, he discovers that ghosts are trying to revenge against Don Demetrio. Ramon, is compelled to work with the ghost. As Ramon struggles to fight for love and justice, he also learns the true meaning of courage which leads him into peacefully serving justice to the three ghosts and at the same time, save himself and Anna from the impending danger that Don Demetrio poses on them.

== Cast ==
- Vhong Navarro as Ramon "Ramoncito" Villamayor
  - Steven de Guzman as young Ramon, 7yo
  - Maliksi Morales as young Ramon, 13yo
  - Makisig Morales as young Ramon, 18yo
- Solenn Heussaff as Anna Ignacio
  - Veighda Inoval as young Anna
- Joey Marquez as Demetrio "Don Demetrio" Demetrio
- John Lapus as Anastacio "Kemerut" Balbitero, Jr.
- Smokey Manaloto as Berting Villamayor
- Matet de Leon as Marie Villamayor
- Empoy Marquez as Dado Balbitero
- Beverly Salviejo as Belen Villamayor
- Joy Viado as Aunt Bless
- Aaliyah Belmoro as Anya Balbitero
- Isabel "Lenlen" Frial as Michelle Villamayor
- Raphael Leuterio as Ryan "Raprap" Villamayor
- Lito Pimentel as Anding Villamayor
- Dominic Ochoa as Arnel Ignacio, Jr.
- Niño Muhlach as Singkit
- Mathew Barrios as Gov. Balbon
- Efren Reyes as Atty. Joey Reynaldo, head of police
- Buboy Garovillo as doctor
- Hyubs Azarcon as priest
- Eric Nicolas as guard
- Kiray Celis as Kiki, JS prom date
- Angie Ferro as Lola Domeng
- Kleggy Abaya as sunog bagas
- Garry Lim as sunog bagas
- Jack Love Falcis as sunog bagas
- Herminio Bautista as a kumpadre
- Val Iglesias as a kumpadre
- Baldo Marro as a kumpadre
- Saicy Aguila as dancer

== Production ==
Under director Joyce Bernal, Irene Villamor served as assistant director, screenwriter Antoinette Jadaone served as 2nd assistant director, Daisy Cayanan served as creative assistant, and RC Delos Reyes served as script continuity supervisor.

=== Casting ===
The film is Navarro's film comeback after Bulong in 2011. It was first announced in November 2013 and started shooting in December 2013. However, Navarro got involved of the mauling incident that happened on January 22, 2014 that the filming was postponed. After recovering from serious injuries, Navarro resumed filming in February 2014, amid his controversial legal battle in relation to a mauling incident.

Before Heussaff, there are plans of having two other leading ladies for Navarro. The first is Angel Locsin, but then it was changed to Ellen Adarna. However, the role ended up going to Heussaff, creating controversies. There is a claim that Vhong had been uncomfortable at the thought of working with Adarna, who admitted to being good friends with Cedric Lee, the main suspect of the mauling incident. Nevertheless, Navarro states that he does not know anything about changes in casting, and he is willing to work with her in the future.

== Release ==
=== Marketing ===
On March 29, 2014, the first official full-length trailer is released on YouTube. Few weeks later, the official theme song of the movie accompanied by a music video is released. The song entitled "Da Vhong Song" is released by producer Star Cinema and performed by Vhong Navarro.

== See also ==
- List of ghost films
