= Jhong Hilario =

Filipino actor, dancer and politician (born 1976)

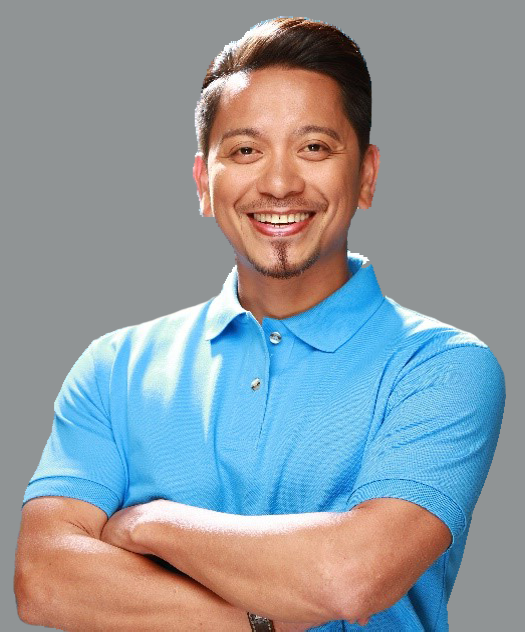
- 2019 campaign portrait

Member of the Makati City Council from the 1st district
- In office June 30, 2016 – June 30, 2025

Personal details
- Born: Virgilio Viernes Hilario Jr. August 11, 1976 (age 50) Asingan, Pangasinan, Philippines
- Party: Makatizens United Party
- Other political affiliations: United Nationalist Alliance (2015–21)
- Spouse: Michelle Westgate (m. 2005; div. 2024)
- Domestic partner: Maia Azores (2011–present)
- Children: 1
- Education: Arellano University (AB); World Citi Colleges (MPA)
- Occupation: Actor; dancer; television host; politician

Virgilio "Jhong" Viernes Hilario Jr. (born August 11, 1976) is a Filipino actor, dancer, television host, and politician. He is a member of the Filipino dance group Streetboys. He served as a councilor of Makati from its 1st district from 2016 to 2025. He is widely known for his antagonistic roles in television, such as Gary David in the 2010 remake of Mara Clara and as Homer "Alakdan" Adlawan in FPJ's Ang Probinsyano (2017–2019). He has co-hosted ABS-CBN's noontime variety show It's Showtime since 2012.

== Early life and education ==
Virgilio Viernes Hilario Jr. was born on August 11, 1976, in Asingan, Pangasinan. He attended primary school at Bangkal Elementary School II in Makati and secondary school at South Eastern College in Pasay from 1991 to 1995. He availed a high school home study program from the Department of Education, Culture and Sports in 1996. In 2023, he graduated magna cum laude from the Arellano University, earning a degree in political science. In 2024, he finished his master's degree in public administration with highest merits from World Citi Colleges.

== Career ==
=== Film and television ===
Hilario started his career in 1993 as a member of the dance group Streetboys. He made his debut as an actor in 1996.

As an actor, Hilario has acted in movies such as Muro Ami, released in 1999, in which he portrayed Butong; D' Anothers (2005), and Dekada '70 (2002).

In 2012, Hilario is part of ABS-CBN's noontime show It's Showtime, starting as a judge until he became one of the hosts of the program.

In 2017, he was cast in the series FPJ's Ang Probinsyano as Homer "Alakdan" Adlawan, one of his best known roles. In 2019, he left the series to focus on his re-election bid for Makati councilor during the 2019 midterm elections.

In 2021, Hilario was chosen as one of the contestants of the third season of Your Face Sounds Familiar. However, after six weeks, including a win in the first two weeks, Hilario withdrew from the competition for the safety of his family. He was later named as a co-host of the show's fourth season, which ran from 2025 to 2026.

In It's Showtime's Magpasikat 2023, he won the grand prize of ₱300,000 with his team alongside Kim Chiu and Ion Perez. The prize money was subsequently donated to their chosen charity.

In 2025, Hilario appeared on an episode of the second season of Rainbow Rumble on Kapamilya Channel, A2Z and All TV, all of which also airing It's Showtime with GMA Network, where he won the total prize of ₱87,000.

=== Politics ===
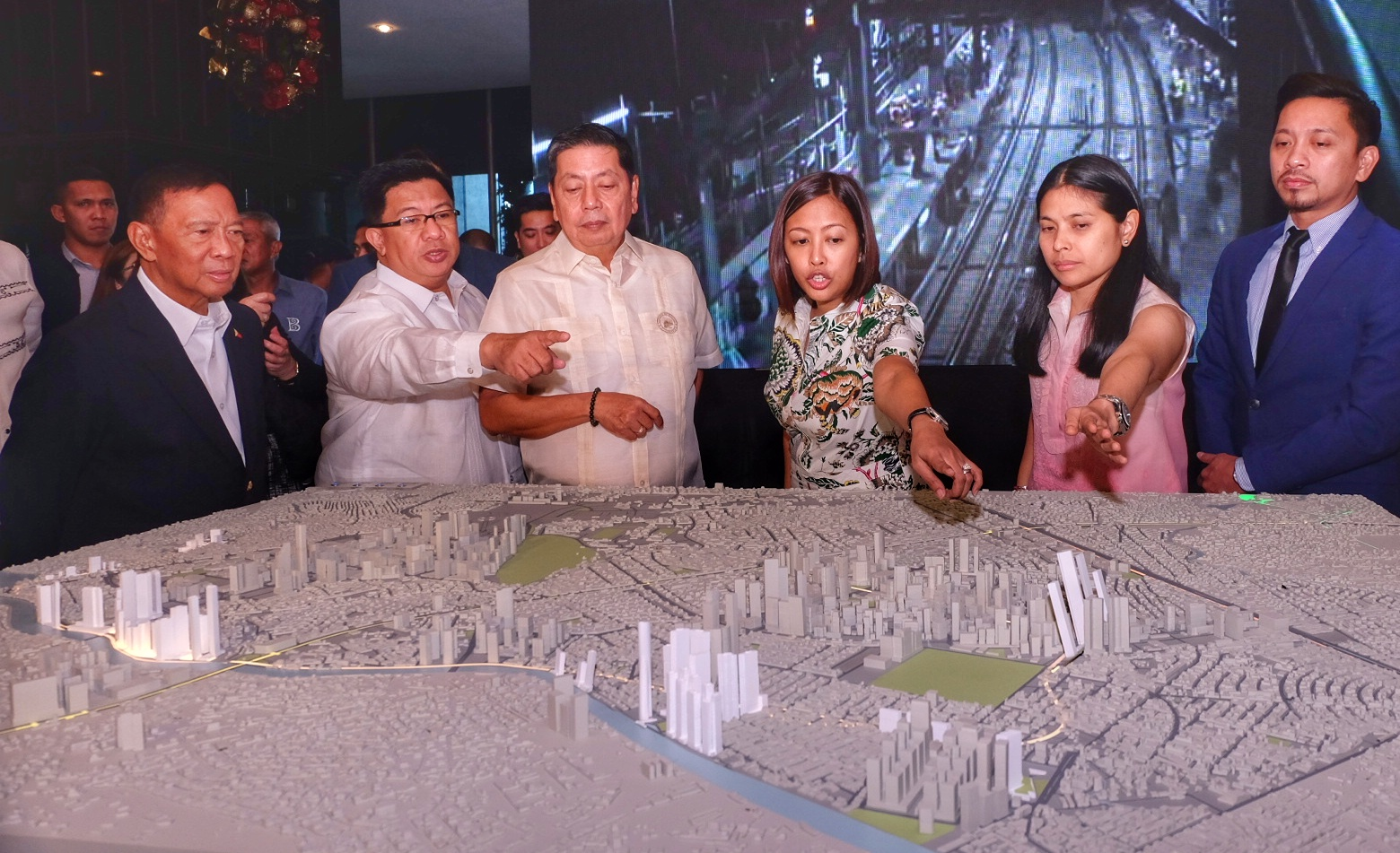
Hilario (right) with fellow Makati councilor Jojo Javier (2nd from left), former vice president Jejomar Binay (left), Makati mayor Abby Binay (3rd from right), and vice mayor Monique Lagdameo (2nd from right) viewing the scale model of the Makati Intra-city Subway project in 2018

Hilario decided to run for councilor in the 1st district of Makati under United Nationalist Alliance and Abby Binay's ticket in 2016. In an interview, Hilario credited his father, Virgilio Sr., who has served as acting vice mayor of Makati in 2015 and a councilor from 2007 to 2016 and again since 2025, as his main inspiration to run for the council seat. He was re-elected in 2019 and in 2022, which was under Makatizens United Party. He was the top vote getter on all the aforementioned elections. He stepped down upon being term-limited in 2025.

== Personal life ==
Hilario married British dresser Michelle Westgate on October 11, 2005, in a civil ceremony officiated by then-Makati mayor Jejomar Binay. They met while working at a West End production of Miss Saigon in London, where Hilario joined the cast ensemble. Hilario and Westgate separated in June 2011. They eventually filed for divorce in England since divorce is not recognized in the Philippines. A Makati court recognized their foreign divorce in July 2024.

In 2014, Hilario revealed that he had been dating Maia Azores since 2011. The two had met on the set of Mara Clara in 2010, where Azores was completing her on-the-job training. They have a daughter who was born in March 2021.

== Filmography ==
=== Television ===
Year	Title	Role	Notes
1999–2001	Rio Del Mar	Rodel	
1999–2001	Maynila	Various roles	
2000–2001	GMA Telesine Specials	Various roles	
2000–2001	Maalaala Mo Kaya		Episode: Wedding Cake
2002–2003	Kay Tagal Kang Hinintay	Ivan	
2003–2004	Basta't Kasama Kita		
2004	Spirits	Kuya Dong	
2004	Maalaala Mo Kaya	Apl.de.ap	Episode: Jacket
2006	U Can Dance	Himself	
2006	Komiks Presents: Da Adventures of Pedro Penduko	Ka Edgar	
2006	Maalaala Mo Kaya	Big Boy	Episode: Rugby
2007	Maalaala Mo Kaya	Joel	Episode: Rehas
2007	Maalaala Mo Kaya	Rex Ferrer	Episode: Tren
2007	Rounin	Venom	
2008	Kapamilya, Deal or No Deal	Himself	
2008	Kung Fu Kids	Kevin Marilao	
2009	Maalaala Mo Kaya	Romualdo "Lolong" Rubi	Episode: Medal for Valor
2010	Showtime	Himself	Judge; voluntarily exited after 30 weeks
2010	Kung Tayo'y Magkakalayo	Jason / Agustin	
2010	Agimat: Ang Mga Alamat ni Ramon Revilla: Tonyong Bayawak	Nitoy	
2010	Pinoy Big Brother: Teen Clash 2010	Himself	Guest judge
2010–2011	Emil Cruz Jr.'s Mara Clara	Gary David	Main Role / Antagonist
2011	ASAP	Himself	
2011	You Got It 2	Himself	
2011	Gandang Gabi, Vice!	Himself	Guest
2011	Happy Yipee Yehey!	Himself	"Waka Waka guest host with John Prats"
2011	Maalaala Mo Kaya	Sumalde	Episode: Bisikleta
2011	It's Showtime	Himself	Judge
2011	The Price Is Right	Himself	With Dimples Romana
2011	Ikaw ay Pag-Ibig	Alex	
2012–present	It's Showtime	Himself	Host
2013	Juan dela Cruz	Poldo	Special Guest / Antagonist
2013	My Little Juan	Poldo	Special Guest / Antagonist
2013	Little Champ	Lucas Caballero / Leon del Torro Jr.	Main Role / Anti-Hero
2013	Gandang Gabi, Vice!	Himself	Guest
2014	Ipaglaban Mo!	Erwin	Episode: Ako ang Biktima
2015	Matanglawin	Himself	Cameo
2015	Walang Iwanan	Kamlon Bautista	Supporting Role / Antagonist / Anti-Hero
2017	Maalaala Mo Kaya	Agustin "Isong" Batucan	Episode: Sto. Niño
2017	Ipaglaban Mo!	Ely	Episode: Hinala
2017–2019	FPJ's Ang Probinsyano	Homer "Alakdan" Adlawan	Main Role / Antagonist
2019	Ipaglaban Mo!	Tony	Episode: Kalaguyo
2021	Your Face Sounds Familiar	Himself	Season 3, performer / contestant
2022	PIEnalo: Pera o Bayong	Himself	Guest co-host
2022	PIEnalo: Palong Follow	Himself	Featured celebrity content creator
2022	The Chosen One	Himself	Actor-Mentor
2024	Family Feud (Philippine game show)	Himself	Celebrity Contestant / Guest
2023–2026	FPJ's Batang Quiapo	young Don Gustavo Guerrero	Supporting role / Guest / Antagonist
2025	Rainbow Rumble	Himself	Contestant
2025–2026	Your Face Sounds Familiar (season 4)	Himself	Host
2026	Sigabo	Django Machica	Antagonist

=== Movies ===
Year	Title	Character/Role
1996	Istokwa	Nestor
1998	Sa Pusod ng Dagat	Luis
1998	José Rizal	Prisoner servant
1999	Muro Ami	Botong
2000	Spirit Warriors	Buboy
2001	Sa Huling Paghihintay	
2001	La Vida Rosa	Boy Kulet
2001	Bagong Buwan	Jason
2002	Dekada '70	Willy
2003	Spirit Warriors: The Shortcut	Buboy
2004	Kulimlim	Ex-convict
2005	Nasaan Ka Man	Nardo
2005	D' Anothers	Gorio
2006	Sukob	Erning
2008	Caregiver	Joseph
2008	Iskul Bukol 20 Years After (Ungasis and Escaleras Adventure)	Fernando
2009	Kinatay	Abyong
2009	Astig (Mga Batang Kalye)	
2009	Lola	Bebong
2010	Noy	Adik 1
2010	Emir	Boyong
2011	Segunda Mano	Dindo
2012	The Healing	Dario
2013	Boy Golden	Guido Perez
2016	The Super Parental Guardians	Val Santos
2017	Mang Kepweng Returns	Vladimir
2017	The Ghost Bride	Cameo
2017	Ang Panday	Sword guard
2019	3pol Trobol: Huli Ka Balbon!	Rigor
2024	And the Breadwinner Is...	Biboy Salvador

== Accolades ==
=== Awards and nominations ===
Year	Award	Category	Work	Result	Ref.
2000	48th FAMAS Award for Best Supporting Actor	Best Supporting Actor	Muro-Ami	Nominated	
2000	23rd Gawad Urian Award for Best Supporting Actor	Best Supporting Actor	Muro-Ami	Nominated	
2000	16th PMPC Star Awards for Movies	Best Supporting Actor	Muro-Ami	Won	
2000	10th Young Critics Circle Awards	Best Performance by Male or Female, Adult or Child, Individual or Ensemble in Leading or Supporting Role	Muro-Ami	Nominated	
2004	18th PMPC Star Awards	Best Single Performance by an Actor	Maalaala Mo Kaya: Yellow Baby	Nominated	
2006	20th PMPC Star Awards	Best Single Performance by an Actor	Maalaala Mo Kaya: Bangka	Nominated	
2007	21st PMPC Star Awards	Best Single Performance by an Actor	Maalaala Mo Kaya: Piso	Nominated	
2011	60th FAMAS Award for Best Supporting Actor	Best Supporting Actor	Segunda Mano	Nominated	
2011	25th PMPC Star Awards for TV	Best Drama Actor	Mara Clara	Nominated	
2012	Golden Screen TV Awards	Outstanding Supporting Actor in a Drama Series	Mara Clara	Nominated	
2012	26th PMPC Star Awards for Television	Best Reality and Game Show Host (Note: Shared with It's Showtime hosts.)	It's Showtime	Won	
2014	37th Gawad Urian Awards for Best Actor	Best Actor	Badil	Nominated	
2014	11th Golden Screen Awards	Best Performance by an Actor in a Leading Role	Badil	Nominated	
2014	24th Young Critics Circle Awards	Best Performance by Male or Female, Adult or Child, Individual or Ensemble in Leading or Supporting Role	Badil	Won	
2017	31st PMPC Star Awards for Television	Best Drama Supporting Actor of the Year	Ang Probinsyano	Nominated	
2018	32nd PMPC Star Awards for Television	Best Drama Supporting Actor of the Year	Ang Probinsyano	Nominated	
2018	8th EdukCircle Awards	Best Supporting Actor (TV Series)	Ang Probinsyano	Won	
2019	Golden Laurel Lyceans' Choice Media Awards	Best Television Supporting Actor	Ang Probinsyano	Won	
2019	3rd Guild of Educators, Mentors, and Students (GEMS)	Best Male Performance in a Supporting Role	Ang Probinsyano	Won	
2020	4th Guild of Educators, Mentors, and Students (GEMS)	Best Single Performance by an Actor	Ipaglaban Mo: Kalaguyo	Won	
2022	Jeepney TV Fan Favorite Awards	Favorite Musical/Variety Show Host	It's Showtime	Nominated	
2024	Metro Manila Film Festival	Best Supporting Actor	And the Breadwinner Is...	Nominated	
