= Mr. Suave =

2003 film by Joyce Bernal

- Theatrical movie poster
- Directed by: Bb. Joyce Bernal
- Screenplay by: Bb. Joyce Bernal; Dindo Perez; Earl Ignacio; Roel Raval
- Story by: Dindo Perez; Earl Ignacio; Roel Raval
- Based on: Original screenplay by Dindo Perez
- Produced by: Charo Santos-Concio; Malou N. Santos
- Starring: Vhong Navarro
- Cinematography: Charlie Peralta
- Edited by: Renato de Leon
- Music by: Edwin "Kiko" Ortega; Parokya ni Edgar (theme song)
- Production company: Star Cinema
- Distributed by: ABS-CBN Films
- Release date: November 19, 2003
- Running time: 99 minutes
- Country: Philippines
- Languages: Filipino; Japanese

Mr. Suave (subtitled hoy! hoy! hoy! hoy! hoy! hoy!) is a 2003 Filipino comedy film co-written and directed by Joyce E. Bernal starring Vhong Navarro (his first movie lead star) and Angelica Jones. Based on the song of the same name by Parokya ni Edgar, the film was released on November 19, 2003.

== Plot ==
Rico Suave (Vhong Navarro) is the ultimate ladies' man. In the bayside market where he works, he is constantly grilled by his four quirky friends (collectively known as the F-Poor) for "Suave" tips. Soon they find out that Rico has a problem: when he gets intimate with a girl, his entire body freezes. Rico is miserable. To help their friend, the F-Poor enlist the services of Venus Marte (Angelica Jones), a sexy con artist. Convinced that Rico is a potential goldmine to exploit, Venus agrees to take on the job. Sparks fly as Venus tries to snare Rico. But, when she finds herself genuinely falling for him, she is caught in a dilemma. Will there be a way out of this rut for Venus? Can Rico regain his old charm as Mr. Suave?

== Cast ==
=== Main cast ===
- Vhong Navarro as Rico Suave
- Angelica Jones as Venus Marte

=== Supporting cast ===
- Isko Salvador as Mr. Tea
- Ketchup Eusebio as Mr. Roboto
- Juddha Paolo as Mr. Clean
- Julius Empoy Marquez as Mr. Takatak
- Long Mejia as Doc Martin
- Val Sotto as Mr. Suave, Rico's Dad
- Ces Quesada as Mrs. Suave, Rico's Mom
- Tuesday Vargas as Stella
- Mahal
- Dagul

== In popular culture ==
- Several scenes of the movie spoofed the Taiwanese drama series Meteor Garden II where Rico Suave is the version of Dao Ming Si (Jerry Yan) and Venus is also the version of Shan Cai (Barbie Hsu) as essayed in the music video of Lara Fabian's "Broken Vow".
