= List of awards and nominations received by Marian Rivera =

Filipino actor (born 1984)

Marian Rivera awards and nominations
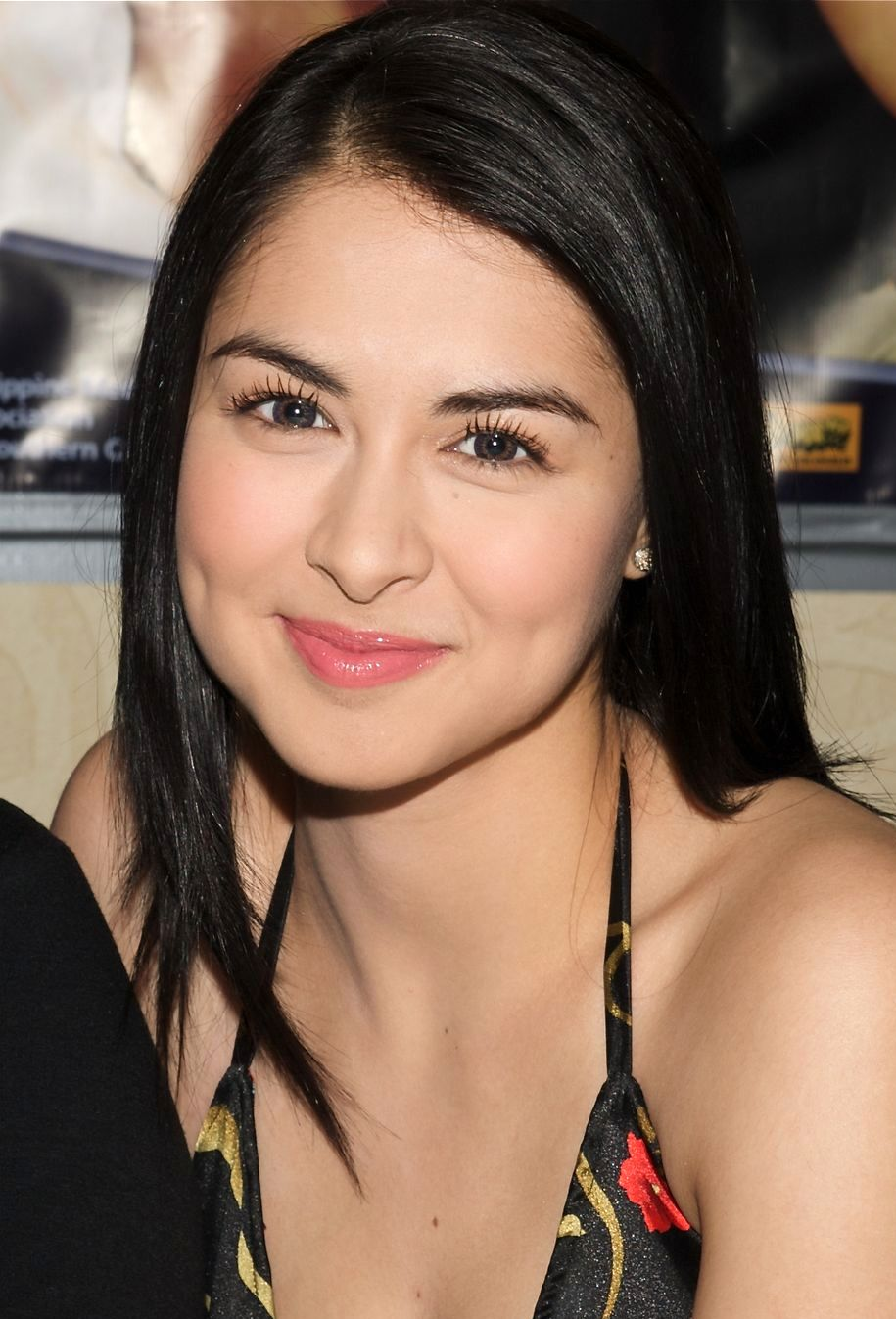
- Rivera at LA Press Conference 2008
Awards and nominations
| Award | Wins | Nominations |

Totals (Note: Certain award groups do not simply award one winner. They acknowledge several different recipients, have runners-up, and have third place. Since this is a specific recognition and is different from losing an award, runner-up mentions are considered wins in this award tally. For simplification and to avoid errors, each award in this list has been presumed to have had a prior nomination.)
- Wins: 28
- Nominations: 21

Filipino and Spanish actress Marian Rivera has received several international and local accolades and nominations for her work in television and films including three FAMAS Awards, five PMPC Star Awards for Television, a PMPC Star Awards for Movies, ten Box Office Entertainment Awards, two EDDYS Awards, a Gawad Dangal Filipino Award, a Enpress Golden Screen TV Award, and a Cinemalaya Philippine Independent Film Festival in addition to nominations from Asian Television Awards, WorldFest-Houston International Film Festival, two Metro Manila Film Festival, Society Filipino Film Reviewers, and Enpress Golden Screen Movie Awards.

Rivera started her career as a commercial model and ventured into acting in mid-2000. She is known for playing Filipino superheroine comic characters in television such as Dyesebel (2008), Darna (2009), and Amaya (2011). For her performance in the historical drama series Amaya, she won a Best Outstanding Performance by an Actress at the Enpress Golden Screen TV Awards in 2013. In the same year, she also won a Best Outstanding Performance by an Actress for her role in the drama-series Temptation of Wife (2008) at the 27th PMPC Star Awards for Television and received a Best Actress nomination at the 18th Asian Television Awards.

In 2015, she was part of the cast in the award-winning film The Bit Player or Ekstra and was nominated for Best Supporting Actress in her role as Belinda at the WorldFest-Houston International Film Festival.

Rivera and her husband Dingdong Dantes have worked together in television series Marimar (2007), Dyesebel (2008), Ang Babaeng Hinugot sa Aking Tadyang (2009), and My Beloved (2012). The couple starred in two movies One True Love (2008) and You to Me Are Everything (2010).

In 2023, Rivera and Dantes returned to mainstream in Star Cinema's movie Rewind (2023), directed by Mae Cruz-Alviar which was an entry to the 49th Metro Manila Film Festival. The movie earned a movie gross of ₱924 million at the box office and became the highest grossing movie of all time. Currently, Rewind is the highest grossing movie in the history of Metro Manila Film Festival and among the highest grossing movie of all time in the Philippines. She received her second Best Actress nomination for playing the role of Mary in the movie at the film festival and her first nomination was in the reboot fantasy film Super Inday and the Golden Bibe (2010).

In 2024, she returned to indie film with Balota, directed by Kip Oebanda and produced by GMA Pictures and Film Development Council of the Philippines. Rivera won Best Actress award at the 20th Cinemalaya Philippine Independent Film Festival, 53rd GMMSF Box Office Entertainment Awards, 8th EDDYS Awards, and 73rd FAMAS Awards.

== Awards and nominations ==
Awards and nominations received by Marian Rivera
| Organization | Year | Work / Nominee | Category | Result | Ref. |
|---|---|---|---|---|---|
| 18th Asian Television Awards | 2018 | Temptation of Wife | Best Actress in a Leading Role | Nominated | |
| Box Office Entertainment Awards | 2008 | Marimar | Most Promising Female Star | Won | |
| Box Office Entertainment Awards | 2008 | Marimar | Phenomenal TV Star | Won | |
| Box Office Entertainment Awards | 2009 | My Best Friend's Girlfriend | Valentine's Box Office Queen | Won | |
| Box Office Entertainment Awards | 2009 | Marian Rivera and Dingdong Dantes | Most Phenomenal Loveteam | Won | |
| Box Office Entertainment Awards | 2010 | Marian Rivera and Dingdong Dantes | Loveteam of the Year with Dingdong Dantes | Won | |
| Box Office Entertainment Awards | 2018 | Sunday Pinasaya | Female TV Host of the Year | Won | |
| Box Office Entertainment Awards | 2019 | Marian Rivera | Bert Marcelo Lifetime Achievement Award | Won | |
| Box Office Entertainment Awards | 2024 | Rewind | Most Popular Loveteam for Movies (with Dingdong Dantes) | Won | |
| Box Office Entertainment Awards | 2024 | Rewind | Phenomenal Box Office Star | Won | |
| Box Office Entertainment Awards | 2025 | Balota | Film Actress of the Year | Won | |
| 20th Cinemalaya Philippine Independent Film Festival | 2024 | Balota | Best Actress | Won | |
| PAFTA Awards | 2025 | Balota | Best Actress | Won | |
| The EDDYS Awards | 2024 | Rewind | Box Office Hero | Won | |
| The EDDYS Awards | 2024 | Rewind | Best Actress | Nominated | |
| The EDDYS Awards | 2025 | Balota | Best Actress | Won | |
| Enpress Golden Screen Awards | 2009 | My Best Friend's Girlfriend | Best Performance by an Actress in a Lead role (musical or comedy) | Nominated | |
| Enpress Golden Screen TV Awards | 2011 | Amaya | Outstanding Performance by an Actress in a Drama series | Nominated | |
| Enpress Golden Screen TV Awards | 2013 | Amaya | Outstanding Performance by an Actress in a Drama Series | Won | |
| Enpress Golden Screen TV Awards | 2013 | Tweets For My Sweet | Outstanding Performance by an Actress in a Gag or Comedy Program | Nominated | |
| Enpress Golden Screen TV Awards | 2014 | Temptation of Wife | Outstanding Performance by an Actress in a Drama Series | Nominated | |
| 5th Inding-indie Film Festival | 2018 | Marian Rivera | Huwarang Aktres sa Television | Won | |
| FAMAS Award | 2008 | Marian Rivera | German Moreno Youth Achievement Award | Won | |
| FAMAS Award | 2012 | Ang Panday 2 | Best Actress | Nominated | |
| FAMAS Award | 2014 | Kung Fu Divas | Best Actress | Nominated | |
| FAMAS Award | 2024 | Rewind | Bida ng Takilya | Won | |
| FAMAS Award | 2024 | Rewind | Best Actress | Nominated | |
| FAMAS Award | 2025 | Balota | Best Actress | Won | |
| 40th Luna Awards | 2024 | Rewind | Best Actress | Nominated | |
| 26th Gawad Pasado | 2024 | Rewind | Best Actress | Nominated | |
| 27th Gawad Pasado | 2025 | Balota | Best Actress | Nominated | |
| 27th Gawad Pasado | 2025 | Balota | Dangal ng Pasado Para Sa Natatanging Pagganap | Won | |
| 4th Primetime Media Choice Awards | 2025 | Balota | Excellence in Performance Award | Won | |
| Manila Film Critics Circle Awards | 2025 | Balota | Best Actress | Won | |
| Metro Manila Film Festival | 2010 | Super Inday and the Golden Bibe | Best Actress | Nominated | |
| Metro Manila Film Festival | 2023 | Rewind | Best Actress | Nominated | |
| PMPC Star Awards for Movies | 2006 | Enteng Kabisote 2: Okay Ka Fairy Ko... The Legend Continues! | New Movie Actress of the Year | Nominated | |
| PMPC Star Awards for Movies | 2024 | Rewind | Takilya Queen | Won | |
| PMPC Star Awards for Movies | 2024 | Rewind | Best Actress | Nominated | |
| PMPC Star Awards for Movies | 2025 | Balota | Best Actress | Nominated | |
| Northwest South Samar State University Students Choice Awards | 2014 | Temptation of Wife | Best Actress in Primetime Teleserye | Won | |
| PMPC Star Awards for Television | 2006 | Agawin Mo Man ang Lahat | Best New Female TV Personality | Won | |
| PMPC Star Awards for Television | 2013 | Temptation of Wife | Best Drama Actress | Won | |
| PMPC Star Awards for Television | 2013 | Extra Challenge | Best Reality Competition Host | Nominated | |
| PMPC Star Awards for Television | 2012 | Tweets for My Sweet | Best Comedy Actress | Nominated | |
| PMPC Star Awards for Television | 2016 | Sunday Pinasaya | Best Female TV Host | Nominated | |
| PMPC Star Awards for Television | 2017 | Sunday Pinasaya | Best Female TV Host | Won | |
| PMPC Star Awards for Television | 2018 | Sunday Pinasaya | Best Female TV Host | Nominated | |
| PMPC Star Awards for Television | 2019 | Sunday Pinasaya | Best Female TV Host | Nominated | |
| PMPC Star Awards for Television | 2019 | Marian Rivera | TV Queen at the Turns of the Millennium | Won | |
| PMPC Star Awards for Television | 2025 | My Guardian Alien | Best Drama Actress | Nominated | |
| Society of Filipino Film Reviewers | 2025 | Balota | Best Lead Performance | Nominated | |
| WorldFest-Houston International Film Festival | 2015 | The Bit Player | Best Supporting Actress | Nominated | |

== Special recognition ==
Special Recognition
| Year | Award giving body | Category | Ref. |
|---|---|---|---|
| 2026 | Bureau of Internal Revenue BIR (RDO) 41 | Pagkilala sa Natatanging Taxpayers | |
| 2026 | Philippine Finest Business Awards | Outstanding Excellence in Acting and Public Influence | |
| 2026 | I-Conique Prestige Awards | Enduring Star of Philippine Entertainment and Legacy Award | |
| 2026 | 12th EdukCircle Awards | Most Influential Celebrity of the Year | |
| 2026 | International Golden Summit Excellence Awards | Asia's Most Internationally Acclaimed Film and Television Actress | |
| 2026 | Philippine Arts, Film and Television Awards | Modern Grandslam Best Actress | |
| 2026 | Dangal ng Pinas | Modern Grandslam Best Actress | |
| 2026 | 11th Southeast Asian Achievements Awards | Best Actress Grand Slam of the Modern Era | |
| 2026 | Primetime Media | 2026 Top Celebrity Endorser Rank 1 | |
| 2025 | Primetime Media | 2025 Top Celebrity Endorser Rank 1 | |
| 2025 | Margarita "Tingting" Cojuangco | Elegant Filipinas Awardee | |
| 2025 | 11th EdukCircle Awards | Most Influential Female Endorsers of the Year | |
| 2024 | 40th PMPC Star Awards for Movies | Star of the Night | |
| 2024 | PeopleAsia Magazine | Silver Screen Goddess | |
| 2024 | Preview PH | Style Icon Award | |
| 2023 | TikTok Philippines | Breakthrough Creator of the Year | |
| 2019 | Anak TV Seal Awards | Makabata Hall of Fame Award | |
| 2019 | 9th EdukCircle Awards | Most Influential Female Endorsers of the Year | |
| 2019 | 33rd PMPC Star Awards for Television | TV Queens at the Turn of the Millennium | |
| 2019 | 50th Box-office Entertainment Awards | Bert Marcelo Lifetime Achievement Award | |
| 2018 | 8th EdukCircle Awards | Most Influential Female Endorsers of the Year | |
| 2018 | Inding-indie Film Festival | Huwarang Aktres sa Telebisyon | |
| 2018 | Anak TV Seal Awards | Makabata Star Awardee | |
| 2018 | Comguild Academe's Choice Awards | Advertisers Friendly Female Host of the Year | |
| 2018 | Comguild Academe's Choice Awards | Most Admired Family Endorser of the Year ( | |
| 2018 | Mother and Child Nurses Association of the Philippines | Celebrity Breastfeeding Influencer | |
| 2018 | 1st NCST Dangal ng Bayan Award 2018 | Media Excellence Award | |
| 2018 | Provincial Government of Cavite CGDFPS | 2018 Cavite Outstanding Women Leader Award | |
| 2017 | 7th EdukCircle Awards | Most Influential Female Endorsers of the Year | |
| 2017 | Anak TV Seal Awards | Anak TV Makabata Awardee | |
| 2017 | De LaSalle Araneta University | Gawad Lasallianeta | |
| 2017 | University of the Philippines | Certificate of Appreciation for Breastfeeding | |
| 2016 | Mother and Child Nurses Association of the Philippines | Breastfeeding Award | |
| 2016 | FHM 100 Sexiest Women in the Philippines | Hall of Famer | |
| 2016 | Anak TV Seal Awards | Anak TV Makabata Awardee | |
| 2016 | National Council on Disability Affairs | Plaque of Appreciation - Kababaihang May Tanging Pangangailangan | |
| 2015 | Rogue Magazine | The Top 50 Most Influential Filipino Online – Included | |
| 2015 | USTv Student Choice Awards | Student Leaders' Choice of Female Social Media Personality Awardee | |
| 2015 | Golden Torch CCA, Inc. | Gawad Sulo ng Bayan Natatanging Pilipinang Aktres sa Pelikula at Telebisyon Awardee | |
| 2014 | Anak TV Seal Awards | Anak TV Makabata Awardee | |
| 2014 | FHM 100 Sexiest Women in the Philippines | Philippine's Finest – Rank #1 | |
| 2014 | Yahoo! OMG Awards | Media Magnet Awardee | |
| 2014 | Philippine for Woman & Disabilities | Chosen Ambassadress for Women and Children with Disability | |
| 2014 | Personal Collection Direct Selling Inc., | Dealer's Choice Awardee | |
| 2013 | Vietnam's Today TV & SNTV's Face of the Year Award | Best Female Foreign Artist Awardee | |
| 2013 | Anak TV Seal Awards | Anak TV Makabata Awardee | |
| 2013 | Movie Writers Welfare Foundation | Gintong Palad Public Service Award with Dingdong Dantes | |
| 2013 | FHM 100 Sexiest Women in the Philippines | Philippine's Finest – Rank #1 | |
| 2012 | TopTenz.net | Top 10 International Beauties of 2012 – Rank #9 | |
| 2009 | Yes! (Philippine magazine) | 100 Most Beautiful Stars Rank 1 | |
| 2008 | Philippine Walk of Fame | Walk of Fame Awardee | |
| 2008 | Filipino-American Visionary Awards | Favorite Television Actress Awardee for MariMar | |
| 2008 | FHM 100 Sexiest Women in the Philippines | Philippine's Finest – Rank #1 | |
| 2008 | USTV Student's Choice Awards | Most Popular Actress in a Drama/Miniseries Awardee for MariMar | |

== Entertainment awards ==
Entertainment Awards
| Year | Award giving body | Category | Result |
|---|---|---|---|
| 2026 | Multi-Media Press Society of the Philippines, | Best Actress Dekada Awards | Won |
| 2026 | 8th Gawad Lasallianeta | Best Actress (Balota) | Won |
| 2025 | International Golden Summit Excellence Awards | Best Actress (Balota) | Won |
| 2025 | 10th Southeast Asian Achievement Awards | Best Actress (Balota) | Won |
| 2025 | 6th VP Choice Awards | Headliner of the Year (Balota) | Won |
| 2025 | Gawad Parangal ng Bayaning Pilipino | Best Actress (Balota) | Won |
| 2025 | World Icon of Excellence & Leadership Awards | Best Actress (Balota) | Won |
| 2025 | 5th TAG Media Chicago | Best Actress (Balota) | Won |
| 2024 | 2nd Southeast Asian Premier Business & Achiever Awards | Best Actress (Balota) | Won |
| 2024 | Asia’s Golden Legacy Awards | Best Actress (Balota) | Won |
| 2024 | Esquire Philippines | Actress of the Year (Balota) | Won |
| 2024 | Rising Filipino Awards | Best Actress (Balota) | Won |
| 2024 | 5th VP Choice Awards | Actress of the Year (Rewind) | Won |
| 2024 | Laurus Nobilis Media Excellence Awards | Best Actress (Rewind) | Won |
| 2024 | 10th Platinum Stallion Media Awards | Best Actress (Rewind) | Won |
| 2023 | Cinema Exhibitors Association of the Philippines | Box Office Queen (Rewind) | Won |
| 2022 | 1st GMA Gala Night 2022 | Couple of the Night with Dingdong Dantes | Won |
| 2016 | OFW Gawad Parangal | Most Popular Family in the Showbiz Industry (DongYanZia) | Won |
| 2016 | PEPList Choice Awards | Favorite Wedding of the Year (w/ Dingdong Dantes) | Won |
| 2016 | Gazette Review | Top 10 Most Beautiful Filipino Celebrity - Included (Top 1) | Included |
| 2015 | OFW Gawad Parangal | Most Popular Couple(with Dingdong Dantes) | Won |
| 2015 | Push Awards | Favorite Female Celebrity | Nominated |
| 2015 | MYX Music Award | Favorite Guest Appearance in a Music Video (with Dingdong Dantes) | Nominated |
| 2015 | PEPList Choice Awards | FAB Star of the Year | Nominated |
| 2015 | PEPList Choice Awards | Celebrity Pair of the Year (with Dingdong Dantes) | Nominated |
| 2015 | PEPList Choice Awards | Newsmaker of the Year (with Dingdong Dantes) | Won |
| 2015 | PEPList Choice Awards | Female TV Star Of The Year Editor's Choice | Nominated |
| 2014 | PEPList Choice Awards | Female TV Star Of The Year Editor's Choice | Won |
| 2014 | CLASS Awards | Most Popular TV Personality of the Year | Won |
| 2014 | OFW Gawad Parangal | Favorite Actress | Won |
| 2014 | Yahoo! OMG Awards | Celebrity of the Year | Nominated |
| 2014 | Yahoo! OMG Awards | Actress of the Year | Nominated |
| 2014 | Yahoo! OMG Awards | Love Team of the Year (with Dingdong Dantes) | Nominated |
| 2014 | Style Bible Best of 2013 | Best Celebrity of the Year | Won |
| 2014 | FHM Magazine Best of the Best | FHM Best Photos of 2013 – Rank #1 | Won |
| 2014 | Cosmopolitan 2014 | Favorite Cosmo Girl | Won |
| 2013 | PMPC Star Awards for Television | Best Dressed Celebrity | Won |
| 2013 | Viki Blog | Global Crossover Asian Stars | Included |
| 2013 | Kzone Awards | Favorite Television Actress | Nominated |
| 2013 | PEPsters Choice Awards | Female News Maker of the Year | Nominated |
| 2013 | Yahoo! OMG Awards | Celebrity of the Year | Won |
| 2013 | Yahoo! OMG Awards | Actress of the Year | Nominated |
| 2012 | Inside Showbiz Magazine | Inside Showbiz Sexiest Women | Included – Rank #3 |
| 2012 | Meg Top Choice Awards | Best Red Lips | Won |
| 2012 | Meg Top Choice Awards | Top Cover Star | Won |
| 2012 | Meg Top Choice Awards | Hottest Couple (with Dingdong Dantes) | Won |
| 2012 | Party Pilipinas Most Liked Awards | Most Liked Kapuso Drama Actress | Won |
| 2012 | Party Pilipinas Most Liked Awards | Most Liked Kapuso Artist | Won |
| 2012 | Party Pilipinas Most Liked Awards | Most Liked Party Pilipinas Performance | Won |
| 2012 | Party Pilipinas Most Liked Awards | Most Liked Kilig Moments (with Dingdong Dantes) | Won |
| 2012 | Party Pilipinas Most Liked Awards | Most Liked Love Team (with Dingdong Dantes) | Won |
| 2012 | Yahoo! OMG Awards | Celebrity of the Year | Nominated |
| 2012 | Yahoo! OMG Awards | Actress of the Year | Nominated |
| 2011 | Yahoo! OMG Awards | Hottest Celebrity | Nominated |
| 2011 | KZone Awards | Favorite Television Actress | Won |
| 2009 | SOP Kapuso Tag Awards | Kapuso Female Fan Fave | Won |
| 2009 | SOP Kapuso Tag Awards | Most Romantic Smooch (with Dingdong Dantes) | Won |
| 2009 | SOP Kapuso Tag Awards | Kapuso Most Wanted | Won |
| 2008 | YES! Magazine Reader's Choice Awards | Cover Star of the Year | Won |
| 2008 | YES! Magazine Reader's Choice Awards | Most Popular Love Team (with Dingdong Dantes) | Won |
| 2008 | 38th Box-Office Entertainment Awards | Face of the Night | Won |
| 2008 | Supreme to the Extreme Awards | Best in Chemistry (with Dingdong Dantes) | Won |
| 2008 | Candy Rap Awards | Best Local Female Star | Won |
| 2008 | Meg Teen Choice Awards | Favorite Female Celebrity | Won |
