= Marian Rivera =

Filipina-Spanish actress (born 1984)

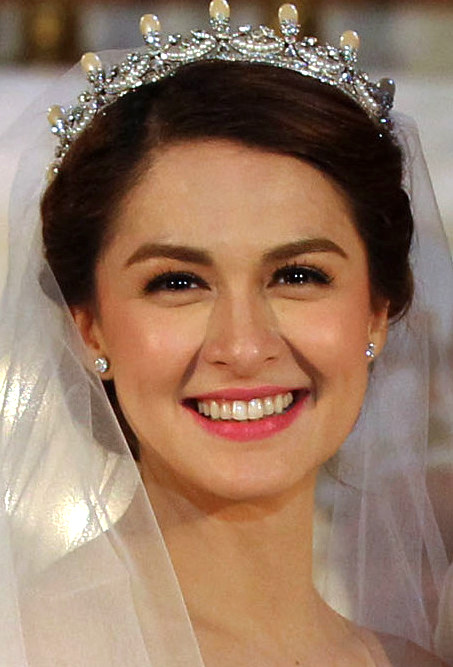
- Rivera in 2014
- Born: Marian Rivera Gràcia; 12 August 1984 (age 42); Madrid, Spain
- Citizenship: Philippines; Spain
- Education: De La Salle University – Dasmariñas (B.A.)
- Occupations: Actress; model; dancer; recording artist; singer; television personality
- Years active: 2004–present
- Notable work: Filmography
- Title: Ambassador for Women and Children with Disabilities (Congress of the Philippines, 2014)
- Spouse: Dingdong Dantes (m. 2014)
- Children: 2
- Awards: Full list

Signature
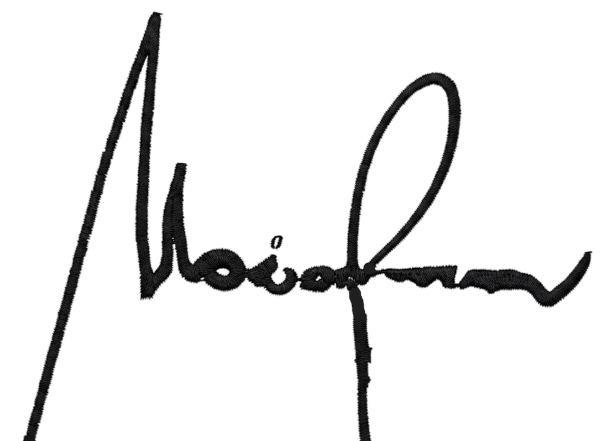

Marian Rivera Gràcia-Dantes (Tagalog: [ˌmaɾjɐn ɾɪˌbɛːɾɐ ˈdantɛs]; born 12 August 1984) is a Filipino model, actress, singer, host, and dancer best known for her portrayals of leading heroines and her performances in romantic dramas films and television series. Widely regarded in the entertainment industry as the "Primetime Queen" and the "Queen of Philippine Movies of Her Generation" for her sustained commercial success and contributions to Philippine cinema, Rivera's accolades include three FAMAS Awards, five PMPC Star Awards for Television, a PMPC Star Awards for Movies, two PAFTA Awards ten Box Office Entertainment Awards, and a Cinemalaya Independent Film Festival Award, including nominations from Asian Television Awards, Luna Awards and Metro Manila Film Festival. In 2020, Forbes Asia named her one of the most influential Filipino celebrities in the Asia-Pacific.

Rivera initially began as a commercial model and ventured into acting in the mid-2000s. In 2005, she made her film debut in Enteng Kabisote 2: Okay Ka, Fairy Ko... The Legend Continues!. The film earned her a nomination for New Movie Actress of the Year at the 2006 Star Awards for Movies. She started playing minor and supporting roles in various projects and rose to stardom in the remake Marimar (2007). She gained wider recognition for her leading roles in television shows such as Dyesebel (2008), Darna (2009), Endless Love (2010), Amaya (2011) and Temptation of Wife (2012). She also top-billed the remake of Super Inday and the Golden Bibe (2010), earning her a nomination for Best Actress at the Metro Manila Film Festival. She has received three nominations for the FAMAS Award for Best Actress. Among her highest-grossing and most commercially successful films are One True Love (2008), Shake, Rattle & Roll X (2008), My Best Friend's Girlfriend (2008), You to Me Are Everything (2010), Temptation Island (2011), Ang Panday 2 (2011), Kung Fu Divas (2013), My Big Bossing's Adventures (2014), and Rewind (2023). As a leading actress, her films have collectively grossed more than ₱1.9 billion at the Philippine box office, establishing her as one of the highest-grossing Filipino box office stars of all time.

Appointed by the Congress of the Philippines as an honorary ambassador for women and children with disabilities, Rivera is also a volunteer for numerous charitable institutions. She is the most-followed Filipino celebrity on Facebook. Preview magazine named her one of the most influential Filipino personalities in 2022. She was the first Filipina to be inducted into the FHM Philippines' Hall of Fame for being the "sexiest woman" in the country for three cumulative years (2008, 2013, and 2014). She was also chosen as one of the members of the selection committee at the Miss Universe 2021 pageant. As a recording artist, Rivera has released two albums: Marian Rivera Dance Hits (2008) and Retro Crazy (2009), receiving Platinum and Gold certifications from the Philippine Association of the Record Industry. She currently hosts the drama anthology series Tadhana (2017–present).

== Early life and education ==
Marian Rivera Gràcia was born in Madrid, Spain to Francisco Javier Gràcia Alonso, a Spaniard, and Amalia Rivera, a native Tagalog from Cavite. Her parents married and eventually divorced when she was three years old, after which her mother brought her to the Philippines where she grew up. However, her mother had to continue with work commitments abroad and Rivera was sent to her maternal grandmother, Francisca Rivera, in Maragondon, Cavite.

Rivera pursued her elementary and high school education at Saint Francis of Assisi College, and obtained a Bachelor of Arts in Psychology degree from the De La Salle University – Dasmariñas. She had completed her practicum at the National Center for Mental Health in Mandaluyong, dispensing medication alongside conducting examination and evaluations of patients.

== Career ==
=== 2004–2008: Career beginnings ===
Marian Rivera pursued ramp modelling in her elementary schooling years then later as TV commercial model for SkinWhite Lotion, Sky Flakes Biscuits, and other labels. These commercial appearances led TAPE Inc. executive producer Antonio Tuviera commissioned her for roles in the afternoon TV soap operas Kung Mamahalin Mo Lang Ako, Agawin Mo Man ang Lahat, and Pinakamamahal. Rivera made her first supporting role film appearance through OctoArts' Enteng Kabisote 2: Okay Ka Fairy Ko: The Legend Continues in 2005 as the fairy Alyssa. In 2006, she signed a contract with Regal Entertainment that featured her debut in the horror film Pamahiin.

In February 2007, GMA Network cast her for motherly roles; first in the Filipino-Malaysian TV drama series Muli. and lastly in the fantasy TV series, Super Twins as the protagonist twins' mother, and villain on later episodes that concluded on 1 June 2007.

In June 2007, Rivera auditioned for and won the lead role in GMA Network's adaptation of the popular Mexican series MariMar (based on Televisa's the 1994 Mexican telenovela of the same title). Opposite to Dingdong Dantes, the show became the highest-rated prime time drama show on Philippine television at that time and launched Rivera to stardom.

She was acknowledged as a Phenomenal TV Star in the 38th Box-Office Entertainment Awards by the Guillermo Mendoza Memorial Scholarship Foundation, Inc. in 2008. That year she won an award for her work in the show, as well as several product endorsements. She was named the country's sexiest woman by FHM Magazine, and was also included in the "hottest" list of other magazines like Maxim and Uno.

That same year, she appeared in two films, Desperadas and Bahay Kubo, both Metro Manila Film Festival entries.

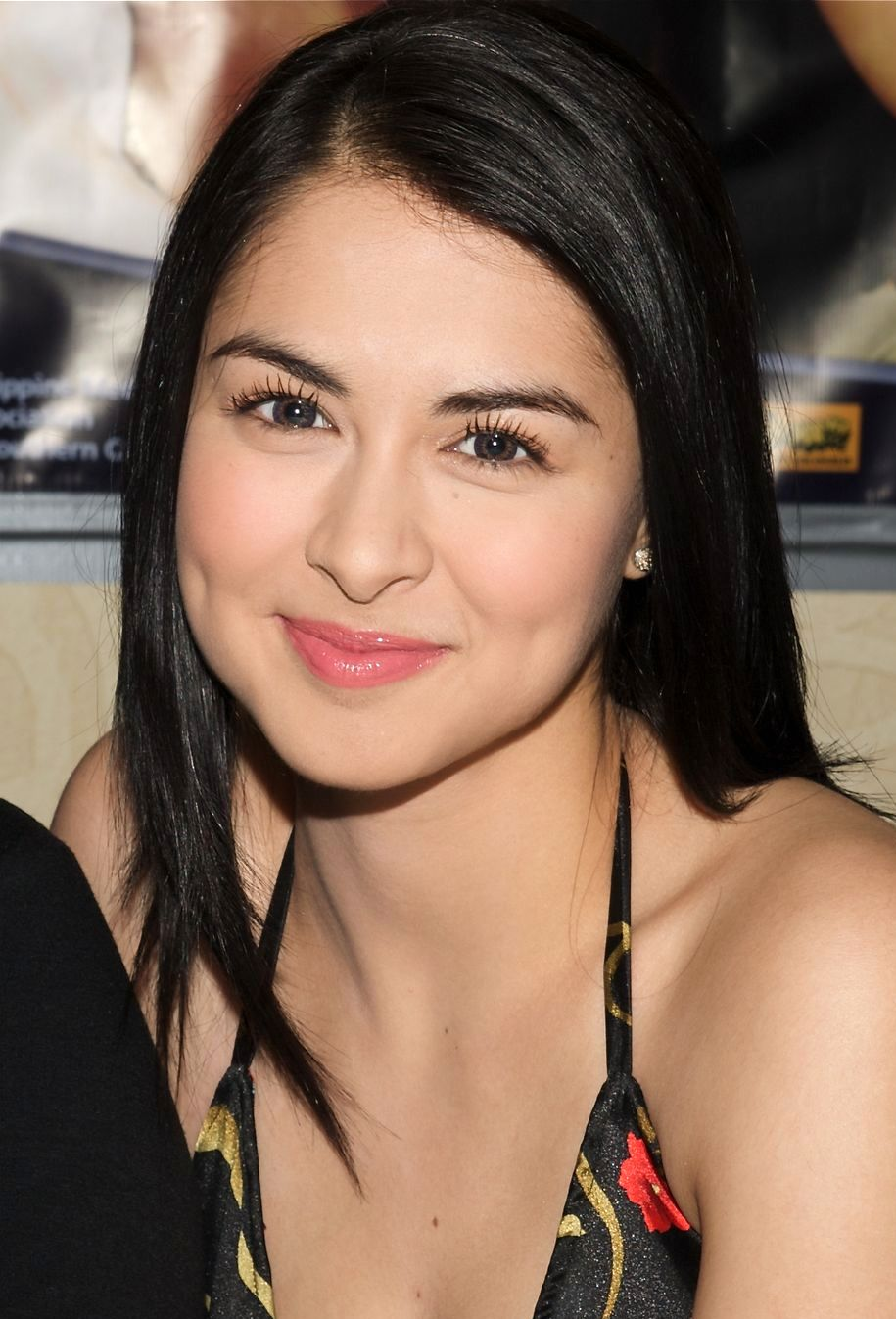
Rivera at LA Conferences (December 2008)

In 2008, Rivera played the title role in Dyesebel, which aired on 28 April 2008, the famous Philippine mermaid character acted by many famous Filipinos actresses from as early as 1970. The series is another team-up with Dantes. The year marked Rivera's first lead role opposite Richard Gutierrez in My Bestfriend's Girlfriend. In the same year, Dantes and Rivera debuted in One True Love, directed by Mac Alejandre. She also appeared in two Metro Manila Film Festival entries such as Shake, Rattle & Roll X, an omnibus horror trilogy in which she played "Nieves, The Engkanto Slayer", and Desperadas 2, a sequel of the 2007 film of the same with Rufa Mae Quinto, Iza Calzado, Ruffa Gutierrez, and Ogie Alcasid. She was among the third batch of stars honored in the Eastwood City Walk of Fame located in Eastwood City, Libis, Quezon City in 2008.

Rivera released her first dance music album entitled Marian Rivera Dance Hits under Universal Records in 2008. It was a compilation of 12 songs, danced and choreographed by Rivera. The album certified a 2× Platinum Record Award by the Philippine Association of the Record Industry (PARI).

=== 2009–2014: Rise to fame ===
In 2009, she released her first single, "Sabay Sabay Tayo" under her second album Retro Crazy. The single and the album both received a Gold Award and later on a Platinum Record Award from PARI.

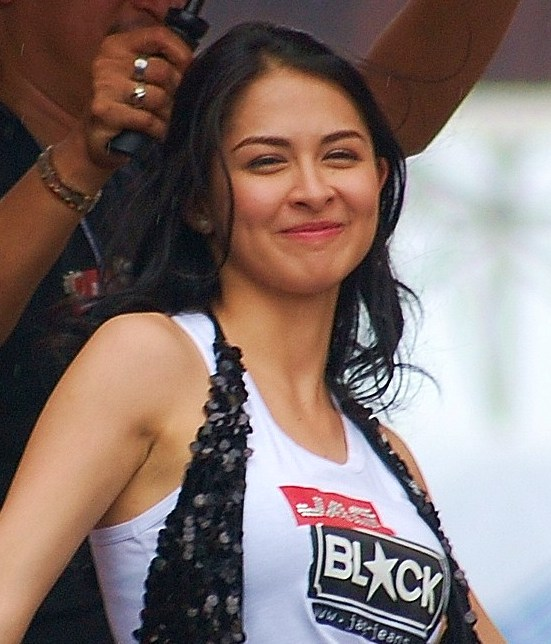
Rivera at the Sinulog Festival in Cebu, January 2009

In February 2009, she appeared in Ang Babaeng Hinugot sa Aking Tadyang, an adaptation of Carlo J. Caparas' graphic novel. It was her third team-up with Dingdong Dantes. Later that year, she was paired with Dennis Trillo in an adaptation of the famous historical fiction heroine created by Mars Ravelo, Darna. She played Narda, who turns into superheroine Darna, after swallowing a magical stone. Nestor Torre of Philippine Daily Inquirer described the series as "loud and livid", praising Rivera's acting. Trillo and Rivera later teamed up for the second time on the horror-suspense film Tarot produced by Regal Entertainment.

She appeared on her first sitcom, Show Me Da Manny, alongside Manny Pacquiao. According to The Philippine Star, Rivera showed a natural comic skill.

Rivera, starred in the Philippine adaptation of Endless Love, a Korean series, aired on GMA Network. Rivera reunited with Dantes in You to Me Are Everything, a romantic-comedy film under GMA Films which premiered on 5 May 2010. She played Francisca Carantes, a girl from Cordillera who turns out to be the daughter of a millionaire.

Gracia starred in her own Metro Manila Film Festival entry, Super Inday and the Golden Bibe, for which she was nominated as Best Actress at the festival's awards night. She starred on a Holy Week drama special, Anghel sa Lupa (Earth Angel), produced by APT Entertainment, as well as in a Christmas series aired on GMA Network, The Christmas Doll.

In 2011, she was cast in Joey Gosiengfiao's Temptation Island, a remake of the 1980 film of the same name. She played the role of Cristina G., a beauty queen aspirant who has been trapped on an island together with contenders acted by Heart Evangelista, Solenn Heussaff, Lovi Poe, and Ruffa Mae Quinto. She also starred in Bong Revilla's fantasy film, Ang Panday 2. That same year, she headlined Amaya, a historical drama fiction depicting early Filipinos in the 16th century. She won several awards and accolades including "Favorite TV Actress" on 2011 KZONE Awards, "Best Actress" in a Prime Time Television Series on NSSUA Awards, and for the first time as "Best Actress" in Golden Screen TV Awards in 2013.

That same year, she won her second "Best Actress" award for the same show at the 2013 Northwest Samar State University Annual Awards. The series is promoted by the National Historical Commission of the Philippines and Department of Education due to its cultural concept that shows and depicts the Filipino material culture, beliefs, traditions and mores in the Pre-Hispanic era.

In 2012, Rivera headlined on different programs of GMA Network such as My Beloved, a Filipino romance drama-suspense-thriller series created and written by RJ Nuevas, under the helm of Dominic Zapata and Lore Reyes.

The series premiered on 13 February 2012, it follows the life and love story of an angel of death named Arlan, a fictional character portrayed by Dantes, who falls in love with a human named Sharina, played by Rivera. He was punished and sent to earth to become human being. But complications arise when he found himself trapped in the body of a notorious criminal. She was cast on her second sitcom Tweets for My Sweet, which earned her two nominations as "Best Actress in comedy show" on 2012 PMPC Star Awards and 2013 Golden Screen TV Awards.

Rivera hosted a reality show, Extra Challenge, with Richard Gutierrez and Boobay. The show is a recurring reality show originally aired in 1999, 2003 and 2006.

In the latter part of 2012, Rivera gained another fame through the Philippine adaptation of a popular Korean series, Temptation of Wife, which aired on the same network. She played Angeline, a long-suffering wife, who has been lied to by his husband, Marcel and a friend named Heidi. Angeline returned as "Chantal", a rich sophisticated woman who takes revenge on the people who had hurt her. The series once again gave fame to Rivera on various Asian countries, resulting to a fan meeting and television guesting's in Vietnam, where the series was aired, along with her other works. The series gave Rivera a "Best Actress" award at the PMPC Star Awards for TV and a "Best Actress in a Lead Role" nomination from the 18th Asian Television Awards with Lorna Tolentino in the series Pahiram ng Sandali. She appeared on her second movie with Richard Gutierrez in a romantic-comedy film entitled My Lady Boss. According to her, "It's my first time to play a mean but ultraconservative character...", referring on her role as Evelyn, "the boss from hell".

Rivera made an appearance for Ekstra: The Bit Player, an official entry to the 2013 Cinemalaya Philippine Independent Film Festival. Rivera appeared with Ai-Ai delas Alas in Kung Fu Divas, a film distributed by Star Cinema as part of their 20th Anniversary in the Philippine Film Industry, Rivera also act as co-producer of the said film.

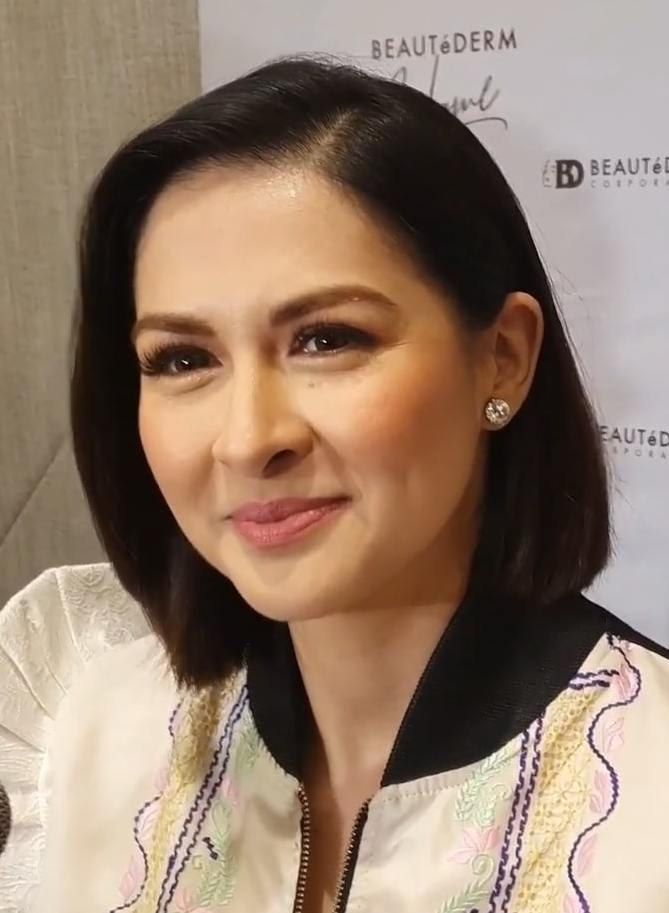
Rivera in 2019

This prompted her to appear for the first time on ABS-CBN, rival network of GMA Network. She appeared on three consecutive episodes of Kris TV, a taped interview in Showbiz Inside Report, and a live interview on The Buzz with Delas Alas. Her last appearance on ABS-CBN was a live interview in Bandila. During the interviews, she revealed she had her on-the-job training (OJT) in ABS-CBN during her college days.

=== 2014–2022: Later years ===
Rivera returned to prime time with a heavy-drama project titled as Carmela: Ang Pinakamagandang Babae sa Mundong Ibabaw (formerly Catarina) broadcast by GMA Network on 27 January 2014, wherein she was paired with Alden Richards.

On 19 April 2014, she headlined in another Lenten television drama anthology special, Panalangin. It was the fourth time she had starred in a Lenten series which was also produced by APT Entertainment and broadcast in the same network.

In 2015, Rivera was supposed to appear in her comeback television program entitled The Rich Man's Daughter, but due to her pregnancy, she was then replaced by fellow Kapuso celebrity Rhian Ramos respectively. Despite her first pregnancy, Rivera pursued to continue some of her appointments in which she appeared in different television commercial ads namely Biofit Tea, Hana Shampoo, Kopiko Cafe Blanca, 555 Tuna, and the recent Del Monte Quick & Easy TV ad, together with her husband Dingdong Dantes. Magazine covers that featured Rivera such as UNO Magazine, Mega Magazine, Preview, Speed Magazine, and Weddings & Beyond Magazine are to be name the few. In the cover of UNO magazine, Rivera was quoted as saying "Pregnancy is a beautiful thing", describing her present condition in her Instagram account.

Rivera was selected as USTv's Student Leaders Choice for Female Social Media Personality Gawad Sulo ng Bayan Natatanging Pilipinang Aktres sa Pelikula at Telebisyon on Golden Torch CCA, Inc., and the 2nd PEPList Choice Awards for its Newsmaker of the Year category, with Dingdong Dantes, was accepted by ABS-CBN newscaster Korina Sanchez on behalf of the couple. Rivera was included to Rogue Magazine's Top 50 Most Influential Filipino Online.

That same year, she headlined with Ai-Ai delas Alas, joined by Alden Richards, Julie Anne San Jose, as well as comedians Jose Manalo and Wally Bayola in the comedy-variety show Sunday PinaSaya.

In 2016, Rivera marked her comeback in television as part of the remake of GMA Network's fantasy TV show, Encantadia.

Rivera made her surprise cameo appearance in romantic-comedy film, Imagine You and Me which stars the love team of Alden Richards and Maine Mendoza.

In 2017, Rivera debuted in her drama anthology for Overseas Filipino Workers (OFW), Tadhana, which premiered on 20 May. She appeared in Super Ma'am since September. In 2021, Rivera was a member of the selection committee for Miss Universe 2021 held in Eilat, Israel.

In 2022, Rivera starred along with Dantes in a sitcom, Jose & Maria's Bonggang Villa which ran for two seasons.

=== 2023–present: Film and television comeback and social media presence ===
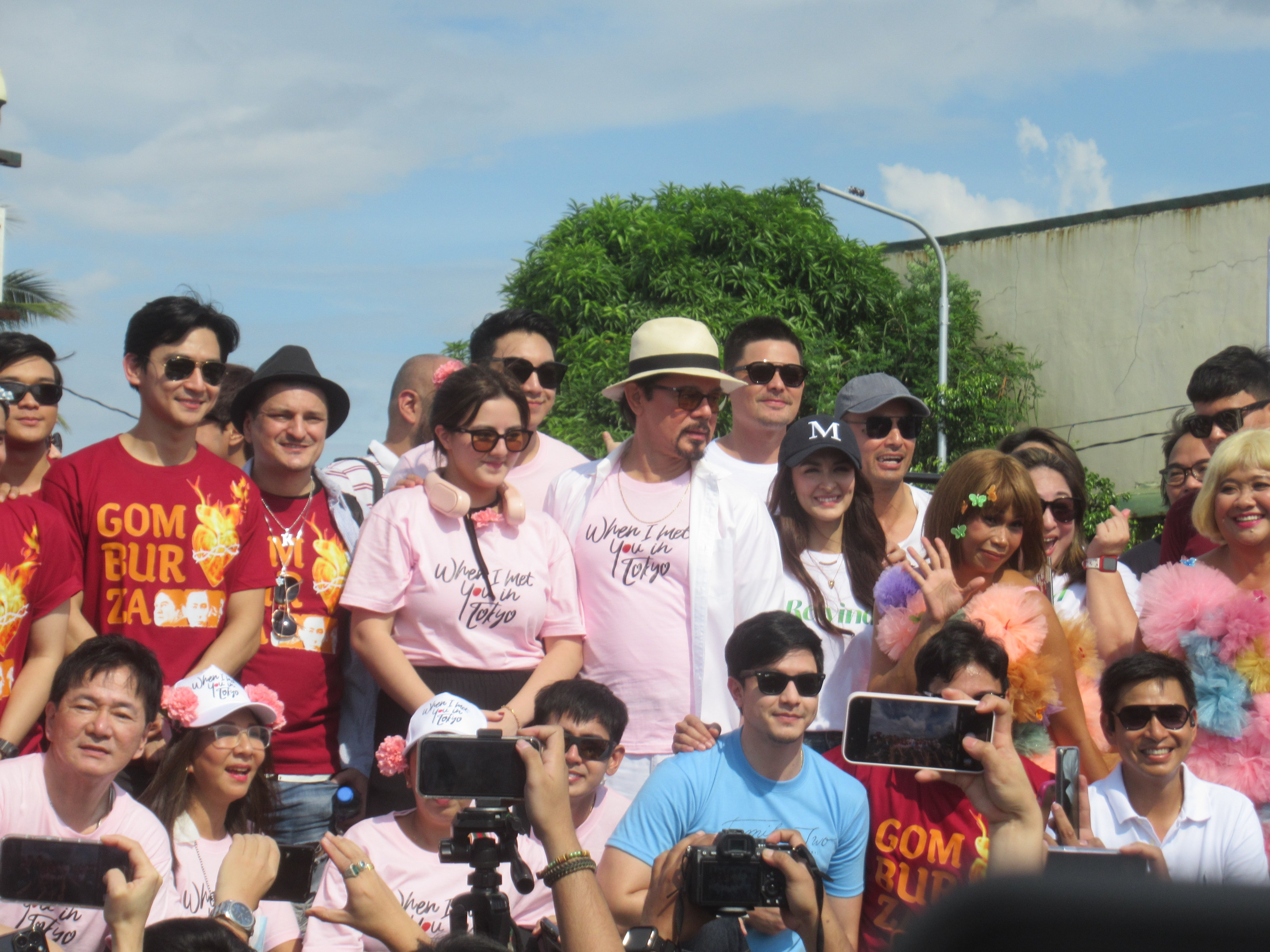
Rivera with Dingdong Dantes for Rewind at 2023 Metro Manila Film Festival

In 2023, Rivera was announced to star in Rewind, a 49th Metro Manila Film Festival film entry. Her performance was critically acclaimed, earning her multiple "Best Actress" wins and nominations in various award-giving bodies. The movie is currently the highest-grossing Philippine film of all time, earning her the title of "Phenomenal Box Office Star" from the 2024 Box Office Entertainment Awards.

Rivera was awarded by TikTok Philippines as the country's "Breakthrough Creator of the Year" for garnering a massive amount of views in her dance covers and other video content. Her most popular video is a dance cover of Jessie J's "Price Tag" which gained 200 million views as of June 2024. As of 2023, Rivera is still the most followed Filipino celebrity on Facebook.

In 2024, Rivera made her television comeback with My Guardian Alien, alongside Gabby Concepcion. That same year, Rivera was announced to headline in her first Cinemalaya film, Balota, wherein she won the festival's Best Actress award.

In June 2025, Rivera returned to television as one of the judges of a celebrity dance competition, Stars on the Floor, with co-judges Pokwang and SB19's choreographer Jay Joseph Roncesvalles and the show was hosted by Alden Richards.

== Other activities ==
=== Philanthropy ===
In 2009, Rivera and Dingdong Dantes, with assistance from Yes Pinoy Foundation, Philippine National Red Cross and Philippine Marines went to Cainta, Rizal to help the victim of Typhoon Ondoy. Aside from being a volunteer in GMA Network's telethon, she helped repacking relief goods from the GMA Kapuso Foundation, a charitable institution from the network.

In 2011, Rivera joined "Marriott Manila", in reaching out for victims of Typhoon Sendong particularly the children in Pasay.

In August 2012, Rivera joined the Philippine Red Cross team during their mission in Quezon City to help out the victims of the flooding. Rivera, together with former senator Dick Gordon, waded through floodwaters to get to an area where some 500 families sought refuge from the floods caused by the non-stop rains. She stated that helping out the victims is her 28th birthday gift to herself. She also said that she did not mind getting wet and tired during the mission, as she says it was a small sacrifice compared to the hardships that the victims are experiencing. According to Rivera, she went as a volunteer and not as a celebrity.

Rivera joined Kris Aquino in visiting affected areas throughout Metro Manila. Rivera organized a blood donation program for the Red Cross at the Ever Gotesco in Quezon City in celebration of her 28th birthday wherein it was attended by lot of people including celebrities.

In 2013, Rivera and her boyfriend Dingdong Dantes contributed for the fund-raising event at the annual Noel Bazaar, the long-running Christmas shopping event in Pasay for GMA Kapuso Foundation. During the Philippines' Typhoon Haiyan, the strongest typhoon ever recorded, Rivera also helped in the packing of relief goods to be distributed to the affected families and supported the Yes Pinoy Foundation's victim assistance program. In addition to that, she launched Oplan: Bangka, a livelihood project in which Rivera will shoulder the expenses for the construction of fishing boats that will be given for Cebu's fishermen.

In 2013, Rivera, along with Dingdong Dantes, joined PETA in their campaign to free the elephant Mali from the Manila Zoo.

On 31 March 2014, she lent her star power to promote the rights of women and children with disabilities in the country as she was appointed by the Congress of the Philippines as Ambassador for Women and Children with Disabilities. She proposed a public-private partnership for the establishment of a special school for children with disabilities so that they can have better access to education. On the latter part of the year, Rivera adds another advocacy to her list as she actively supports "Smile Train", an international children's charity with a sustainable approach to a single, solvable problem: cleft lip and palate.

=== Business ===
Rivera opened her first business, Flora Vida, an online flower shop in 2017. Each flower arrangement is creatively and designed by Marian herself. In 2020, she expanded her floral arrangements business into, Flora Vida Home, which sells furnitures, table runners, placemat, curtains, coasters, pillow cases and other items personally designed by herself.

== Public image ==
External images
- Rivera's FHM Cover FHM Magazine cover from January 2013
- Rivera's second FHM Magazine cover, March 2014

Rivera was declared as FHM Magazine's Sexiest Woman in 2008. With her victory, the FHM staff clarified that contrary to popular impression, Rivera was already being eyed by FHM even before her career skyrocketed because of Marimar. Before arising as top 1 in the Top 100 list, she was already listed in the list in 2006 and 2007 at #38 and #24 respectively.

She was consistently in the upper top 10 after her declaration as Philippines' finest woman, ranking #3 in 2009, #4 in 2010 and #2 losing to Sam Pinto, in 2011.

In 2009, Rivera was listed at #5 in the "Top 20 Celebrity Endorser"'s list of Manila Standard and #1 in QTV's Ang Pinaka... List of Endorsers. In 2010, she was listed at SPOT's list of "Top 10 Most In-demand Celebrity Endorsers" at #3. Christine Marie Leido of AB Communications, Inc. stated, "In our choice, for instance, of Marian Rivera[...]she provided the excitement, fresh look and instant recognition the brand needed. The market understood the product and was able to relate to it because she embodied the values the brand stood for ... As could be expected, she motivated purchase because of her appeal across all classes and gender."

In 2011, YES! Magazine listed her on their "Top 20 Endorsers" list which was a result of cumulative earnings of each celebrity on their endorsements alone.

In 2012, she charted at #9 on the "Top 10 International Beauties of 2012" published by TopTenz, the only Asian who made it to the list. According to the website, Rivera belonged to the major stars of the Philippines.

Also in 2012, Rivera entered at #5 in FHM's Sexiest Women list, her lowest since topping the list in 2008. She featured on the cover for the first time on FHM through its January 2013 issue, which made her one of the biggest contenders for the title Sexiest Woman of the World for 2013. Rivera appeared on the cover of Cosmopolitan Magazine in the same month. For the third time, she was featured on the cover of Women's Health in March 2013. She stated she owed her physique to Muay Thai and Wushu; both forms of martial arts.

In 2013, Rivera was declared by FHM Philippines as "the sexiest woman in the Philippines", making her second to reclaim the coveted title five years after she first won it (the first was Angel Locsin, who won it in '05 and '10). According to FHM, more than 16 million votes were cast that year, and the final tally saw Rivera raking in a total of 890,490 votes against Sam Pinto's 778,681.

Also in 2013, Rivera became the image of popular brand Ginebra San Miguel following her successful stint for the brand back in 2009.

== Personal life ==
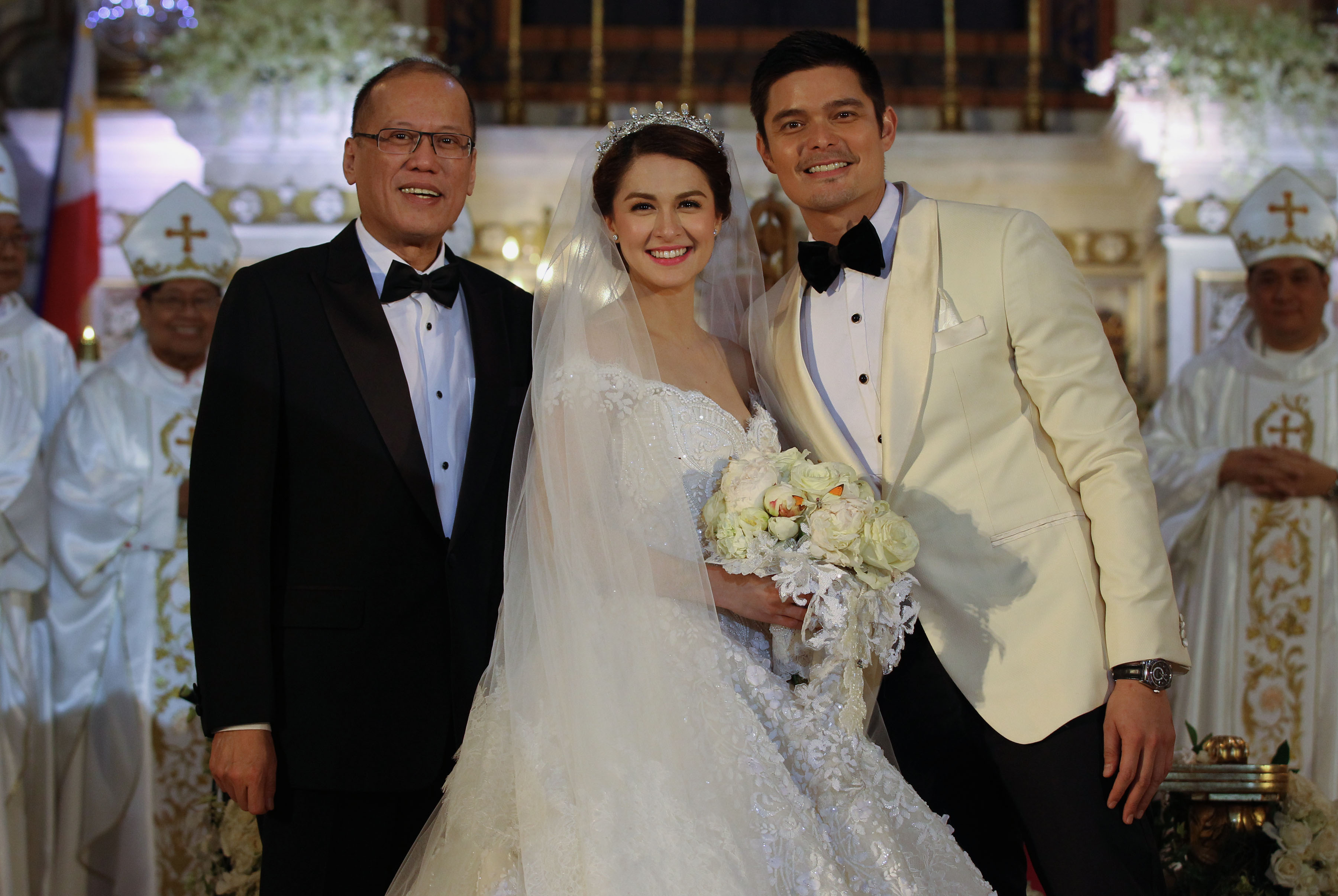
Then-President Benigno Aquino III (left) as principal sponsor for the wedding of Rivera (center) to Dantes (right) in 2014.

In August 2014, during a live airing of Rivera's dance program, her longtime boyfriend Dingdong Dantes, made a special guest appearance and made a surprise wedding proposal to her. It was the second proposal by Dantes; the first one had been in Macau. In order to marry him, she had to be received into the Catholic Church via conditional baptism; her initial baptism in Spain was considered invalid since the administering denomination was not on the list of those recognized as giving valid baptisms by the Church in the Philippines. Prior to being received by the Catholic Church, Rivera was a member of the Philippine Independent Church.

On 30 December 2014, she married Dantes. The wedding was held at Cubao Cathedral in Quezon City, while the reception took place at the Mall of Asia Arena in Pasay, televised live on GMA Network. Dantes and Rivera had invited over 1,200 guests to their wedding. In April 2015, the couple announced that they were expecting their first child; Rivera gave birth to a daughter on 23 November of the same year at Makati Medical Center named Maria Letizia (nicknamed Zia).

Rivera supports breastfeeding in public. She was given the Breastfeeding Influencer and Advocate Award by the Mother and Child Nurses Association of the Philippines on 25 November 2016, citing her advocacy for public breastfeeding.

On 25 September 2018, Dantes and Rivera announced that they were expecting their second child. Their son, Jose Sixto IV (nicknamed Ziggy), was born at Makati Medical Center on 16 April 2019, Holy Tuesday. He was named after his father, Dingdong Dantes, whose real name is Jose Sixto Dantes III.

== Filmography ==
=== Selected filmography ===
Film

- Enteng Kabisote 2: Okay Ka, Fairy Ko... The Legend Continues! (2005)
- Pamahiin (2006)
- Bahay Kubo: A Pinoy Mano Po! (2007)
- Desperadas (2007)
- My Bestfriend's Girlfriend (2008)
- One True Love (2008)
- Shake, Rattle & Roll X (2008)
- Desperadas 2 (2008)
- Tarot (2009)
- You to Me Are Everything (2010)
- Super Inday and the Golden Bibe (2010)
- Joey Gosiengfiao's Temptation Island (2011)
- Ang Panday 2 (2011)
- My Lady Boss (2013)
- Ekstra (2013)
- Kung Fu Divas (2013)
- My Big Bossing's Adventures (2014)
- Rewind (2023)
- Balota (2024)
- Remember (2026)

Television

- Kung Mamahalin Mo Lang Ako (2005–2006)
- Agawin Mo Man ang Lahat (2006)
- Pinakamamahal (2006)
- Super Twins (2007)
- Muli (2007)
- Marimar (2007–2008)
- Dyesebel (2008)
- Ang Babaeng Hinugot sa Aking Tadyang (2009)
- Mars Ravelo's Darna (2009–2010)
- Endless Love (2010)
- Jillian: Namamasko Po (2010–2011)
- Amaya (2011–2012)
- My Beloved (2012)
- Temptation of Wife (2012–2013)
- Carmela: Ang Pinakamagandang Babae sa Mundong Ibabaw (2014)
- Encantadia (2016–2017)
- Super Ma'am (2017–2018)
- My Guardian Alien (2024)

== Awards and recognition ==
Rivera has received several international and local accolades and nominations for her work in television and films including four FAMAS Award, five PMPC Star Awards for Television, a PMPC Star Awards for Movies, ten Box Office Entertainment Awards, two EDDYS Award, a Gawad Dangal Filipino Award, a Enpress Golden Screen TV Awards and a Cinemalaya Philippine Independent Film Festival in addition to nominations from Asian Television Awards, WorldFest-Houston International Film Festival, two Metro Manila Film Festival, a Society Filipino Film Reviewers nomination, and a Enpress Golden Screen Movie Awards.

Preceded by Katrina Halili	FHM Philippines; Sexiest Woman of the Year (2008)	Succeeded by Cristine Reyes
Preceded by Meg Imperial	FHM Cover Girl (January 2013)	Succeeded by LJ Reyes
Preceded by Phoemela Baranda	FHM Cover Girl (March 2014)	Succeeded by Ashley Rivera
Preceded by Sam Pinto	FHM Philippines; Sexiest Woman of the Year (2013, 2014)	Succeeded by Jennylyn Mercado
