= Pamahiin =

2006 Filipino supernatural horror film

- Directed by: Rahyan Carlos
- Written by: Andrew Paredes; Rahyan Carlos
- Produced by: Lily Monteverde; Roselle Monteverde-Teo
- Starring: Dennis Trillo; Iya Villania
- Cinematography: Jun Aves
- Edited by: Jay Halili
- Music by: Richard Gonzales; Vince de Jesus
- Production companies: Regal Entertainment; Regal Multimedia, Inc.
- Release date: April 19, 2006
- Running time: 100 minutes
- Country: Philippines
- Languages: Filipino; English
- Box office: ₱5.5 million

Pamahiin (English: Superstitions) is a 2006 Filipino supernatural horror film directed by Rahyan Carlos, released on April 19, 2006. It stars Dennis Trillo and Iya Villania, alongside Jaclyn Jose, Paolo Contis, and Marian Rivera in their supporting roles. The premise of the film is based on personal beliefs in superstitions in the Philippines.

== Cast ==
=== Main cast ===
- Dennis Trillo as Noah
- Iya Villania as Eileen

=== Supporting cast ===
- Marian Rivera as Becca
- Paolo Contis as Damian
- Vangie Labalan as Tita Amelia
- Chris Daluz as Mang Sebring
- Kookoo Gonzales as Soledad
- Jaclyn Jose as Aling Belinda
- Arpee Bautista as Temyong
- Erica Dehesa as Lota
- JM Reyes as young Noah

== Production ==
Regal Films producers Lily Monteverde and daughter Roselle hired television director Rahyan Carlos to direct his first full-length feature film. While collaborating with scriptwriter Andrew Paredes, the plot took inspiration after the death of Carlos' uncle who was also a director before filming. Carlos watched all the Asian horror movies while researching various Philippine superstitions to influence his film.
