= AJ Dee =

Filipino actor and model (born 1982)

- Born: Angel James Velasquez Dee III; July 27, 1982 (age 44); Naga, Camarines Sur, Philippines
- Other names: Aj Alter Ego, MAXIMVS
- Education: Ateneo de Naga University
- Occupations: Actor, model
- Years active: 2004–2016
- Agent: Star Magic (2004–2016)
- Spouse: Olga Havran
- Children: 2
- Family: Enchong Dee (brother)

Angel James Velasquez Dee III (born July 27, 1983), professionally known as AJ Dee, is a Filipino actor, model and swimmer. He is the brother of fellow swimmer and actor Enchong Dee.

== Early life ==
While in high school, Dee participated in the Philippines' Palarong Pambansa and was picked to join the Philippine swimming team and participated in events in Hong Kong, Brunei, Singapore, and Taiwan.

Dee also participated in the Mossimo Bikini Summit and the Fashion Designers Association of the Philippines (FDAP)'s Body Shots Model Search.

== Career ==
Dee became a co-host of the variety show MTB: Ang Saya Saya after becoming a runner-up on the show's "TV Idol UR D Man" contest. Previously, Dee had a small role in Basta't Kasama Kita and was one of the hosts of ABS-CBN's regional variety show Kilig Bicool!

Dee's first film appearance was in Star Cinema's Dreamboy in 2005. In the same year, he was cast in the primetime teleserye, Vietnam Rose and joined The Buzz as one of the hosts of the "Wanna Buzz" segment.

In 2014, Dee played Caleb, the half-wolf father of Meg Imperial's character, in Moon of Desire and appeared in docu-dramaSa Puso Ni Dok.

In 2015, he had a special participation in Bridges of Love and in Pasión de amor.

Aside from acting, Dee modeled for Bench and appeared in TV commercials. He also maintains a fashion blog—The Filo Dapper.

== Personal life ==
Dee studied high school at Naga Hope Christian School and obtained his Bachelor of Science in Business Management degree at the Ateneo de Naga University. He is the older brother of Enchong Dee.

Dee is currently based in Norway with his Norwegian wife Olga Havran and sons Maximus James and Alexandros Jayden.

== Filmography ==
=== Film ===
Year	Title	Role	Notes	Source
2005	Dreamboy	Isidro		
2006	Mano Po 5: Gua Ai Di	Anderson		
2007	You Got Me!	Francis Villanueva		
2008	When Love Begins	Greg		
2009	Love Me Again	Koboy		
2010	You to Me Are Everything	Carding		
2012	My Amiga Girl			
2012	Shake, Rattle and Roll Fourteen: The Invasion	Pvt. 1st Class Blas Rogado	Segment: "Lost Command"	
2015	Etiquette for Mistresses	Man in car	Cameo	
2015	Turo Turo			

=== Television ===
Year	Title	Role	Notes	Source
2004–2005	MTB: Ang Saya Saya	Himself - Host		
2005	Vietnam Rose	Tran Him Hahn-Trihn		
2006	The Buzz	Himself - Host	Segment: "WannaBuzz", "PBB Buzz"	
2007	Rounin	Braullo		
2007	U Can Dance Version 2	Himself - Contestant		
2008	Eva Fonda	Martin		
2009	Precious Heart Romances: The Bud Brothers	Anton		
2009–2011	Show Me Da Manny	Marco Antonio Barreiro		
2009–2010	Ikaw Sana	Dominic		
2011	Amaya	Paratawag		
2012	My Beloved	Warren		
2012	Tweets for My Sweet	Ariel		
2013	Never Say Goodbye	Steve		
2013	Huwag Ka Lang Mawawala	Edgar		
2013	Maghihintay Pa Rin	Lance		
2014	Moon of Desire	Caleb		
2014	Sa Puso ni Dok	Jomar		
2015	Bridges of Love	Louie Sandejas		
2015	Pasión de Amor	Daniel Burgos		
2016	Tubig at Langis	Matteo		

=== Theater ===
Year	Title	Role	Notes	Source
2006	Oedipus the King	Oedipus	Cultural Center of the Philippines	
2007	A Portrait of the Artist	Tony Javier		
2011	The Frog Prince	Frog Prince	Clark Pampanga Theater	
