= Charlomagne Vales Arceta =

Charlomagne Vales Arceta, known professionally as, Charles Vales Arceta (born November 15, 1994), is a Filipino television host, model, pageant expert, film critic and journalist. Dubbed as The King of Entertainment Publicists in connection with his work in entertainment publicity and film promotion. He is the founder of Primetime Media, a Philippine-based digital entertainment media platform, and the host of the television program Guess What on EuroTV Philippines.

== Early life and education ==
Charles Vales Arceta was born on November 15, 1994, in Liliw, Laguna, Philippines. He completed his primary and secondary education at Kapitan Jose Cardones Integrated School. He later pursued a Bachelor of Arts in Psychology, which contributed to his interest in communication, media, and public relations.

== Career ==
Arceta began his media career in the Philippine pageantry industry. He became known as a pageant media personality and served as the president of Philippine Pageant Portal and Infinity Pageant Icon 101, organisations dedicated to the promotion and recognition of pageantry and related events.

In 2020, he expanded his career into entertainment media and digital journalism. He became the visionary behind Primetime Media Magazine, an entertainment-focused digital media platform officially established in 2022. Through the platform, he has covered entertainment news, celebrity features, film reviews, pageants, awards ceremonies, and public affairs.

As a television personality, Arceta gained wider recognition through his work as host of Guess What, an entertainment and lifestyle talk show airing on EuroTV Philippines. The program features interviews with celebrities, public figures, advocates, entrepreneurs, and community leaders.

== Public Image ==
Arceta is recognized for his involvement in media, entertainment, and awards organizations. He has held leadership positions in several institutions, including: Founder and President of Primetime Media Choice Awards, Founder and President of Manila Film Critics Circle Awards, Vice President of Philippine Arts Film & Television Awards.

His initiatives focus on recognizing excellence in entertainment, media, film, television, and public service while promoting Filipino talent and achievement.

== Awards and Recognitions ==
Arceta has received various awards and recognitions for his contributions to media and entertainment. Notable honors include:

- Southeast Asian Achievement Awards (6th, 7th, and 11th Editions) – Most Outstanding Media Personality
- 2nd Gawad Dangal Filipino Awards – Most Outstanding Media Personality
- 3rd Global Excellence Leadership Award – Most Popular Media Personality
- 1st Asia's Idol Chronicle – Outstanding and Inspiring Media Personality of the Year
- 2nd Dangal ng Lahing Filipino Awards – Phenomenal Media Personality
- 2nd Philippines Distinct Men & Women of Excellence – News Maker of the Year
- 1st Asia's Golden Legacy Awards – Asia's Most Outstanding Media Artist and Media Host of the Year
- 1st Global Leadership Achievers Awards – Multi-Awarded Artist and Remarkable Media Host of the Year
- 1st World Icon of Excellence Awards – Multi-Awarded Renowned Media Host
- 1st Gawad Parangal ng Bayaning Pilipino Awards – Multi-Awarded Media Host and Hero of Excellence in Artistry
- 2nd Southeast Asian Premier Business and Achiever Awards – Premier Achiever Outstanding Media Personality
- International Golden Summit Excellence Awards – Rising International Media Personality
- 1st Rising Filipino Awards – Phenomenal Media Personality and Social Media Visionary of the Year
- 3rd Philippines Distinct Men & Women of Excellence – Distinct Media Personality of the Year
- 1st Dangal ng Pinas Awards – Outstanding Media Personality and Industry Leader
- 4th Philippines Finest Business Awards – Excellence in Media and Communication Leadership
- Television Host - Guess What (EuroTV Philippines)

== Legacy ==
He is regarded as an emerging figure in Philippine entertainment media, recognized for his contributions as a television host, digital media executive, pageant commentator, and awards organizer. Through Primetime Media and his various media initiatives, he continues to support the promotion of Filipino talent, entertainment excellence, and public recognition programs in the Philippines.
