= Pinakamamahal =

2006 Philippine television drama series

- Title card
- Also known as: Beloved
- Genre: Romantic drama
- Directed by: Bibeth Orteza
- Starring: Oyo Boy Sotto; Marian Rivera
- Theme music composer: Janno Gibbs
- Opening theme: "Pinakamamahal" by Janno Gibbs
- Country of origin: Philippines
- Original language: Tagalog
- No. of episodes: 60

Production
- Executive producers: Antonio P. Tuviera; Malou Choa-Fagar
- Producer: Antonio P. Tuviera
- Camera setup: Multiple-camera setup
- Running time: 30 minutes
- Production company: TAPE Inc.

Original release
- Network: GMA Network
- Release: August 14 – November 3, 2006

Pinakamamahal (trans. / international title: Beloved) is a 2006 Philippine television drama romance series broadcast by GMA Network. It stars Oyo Boy Sotto and Marian Rivera. It premiered on August 14, 2006 on the network's Dramarama sa Hapon line up. The series concluded on November 3, 2006, with a total of 60 episodes.

== Cast and characters ==
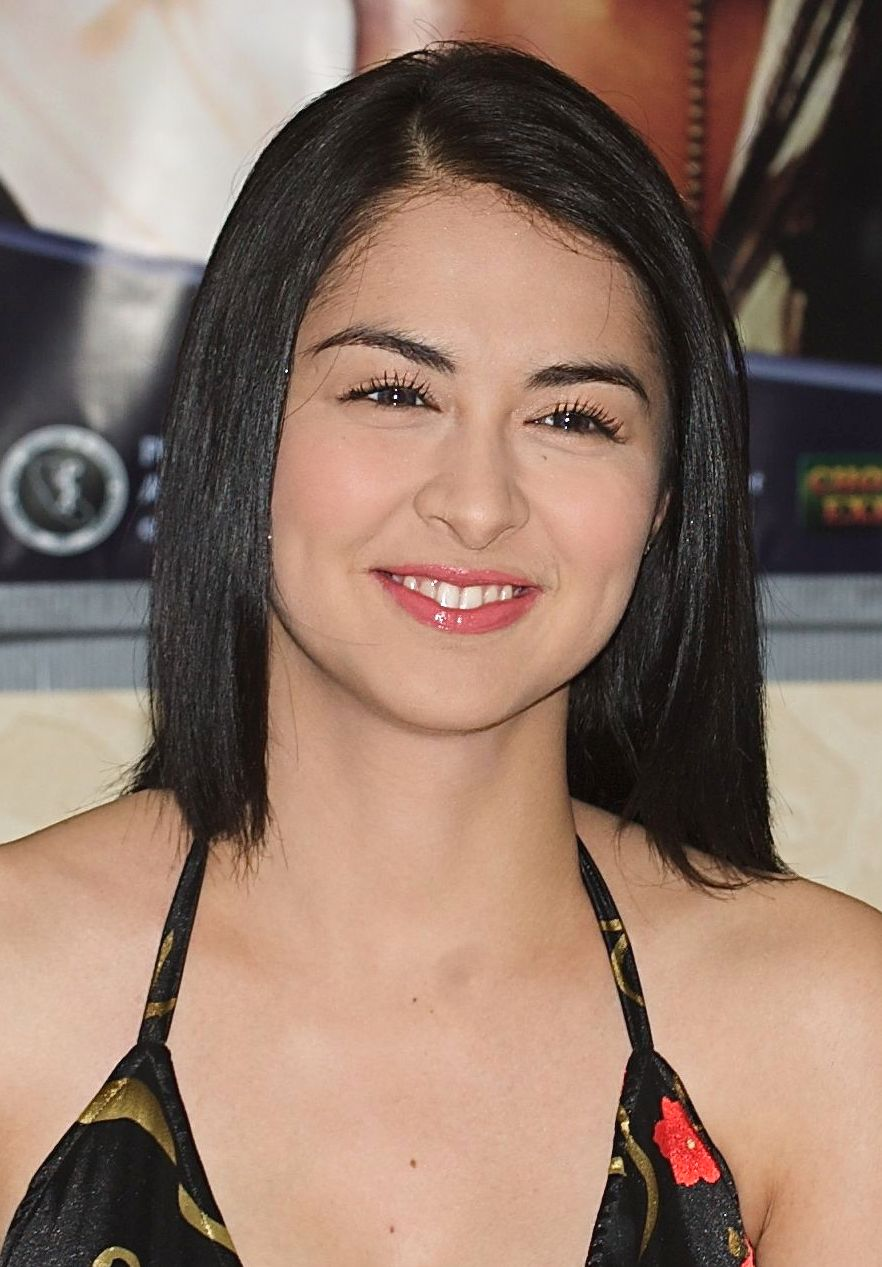
Marian Rivera portrays Carissa Crismundo.

Lead cast

- Oyo Boy Sotto as Martin Padua
- Marian Rivera as Carissa Crismundo

Supporting cast

- Pauleen Luna as Nanette Casayuran
- Danilo Barrios as Jeremy Dizon
- Danica Sotto as Amy Querubin
- AJ Eigenmann as Lito Arguelles
- Hero Angeles as Michael Casayuran
- Maritoni Fernandez as Marikrissa Padua
- Lollie Mara as Sofia Padua
- Gary Estrada as Ricardo Padua
- Pinky Amador as Margie Crismundo
- Krystal Reyes as Cristine "Tintin" Padua
- Menggie Cobarrubias as Gustino "Father Gustin"
- Robert Seña as Edward
- Bing Loyzaga as Salve Querubin

Guest cast

- Sandy Andolong as Agatha Lucero
- Joyce Ching as younger Nanette
- Vice Ganda
