= Tarot (2009 film) =

- Theatrical release poster
- Directed by: Jun Lana
- Written by: Jun Lana; Elmer L. Gatchalian
- Produced by: Lily Y. Monteverde; Roselle Y. Monteverde
- Starring: Marian Rivera; Dennis Trillo; Roxanne Guinoo; Gloria Romero
- Cinematography: Mo Zee
- Edited by: Tara Illenberger
- Music by: Alfredo Ongleo
- Production company: Regal Films
- Distributed by: Regal Entertainment GMA Pictures
- Release date: August 26, 2009 (Philippines)
- Running time: 105 minutes
- Country: Philippines
- Language: Filipino

Tarot is a 2009 Filipino horror-thriller film directed by Jun Lana and starring Marian Rivera and Dennis Trillo. The film was produced by Regal Entertainment and was distributed by GMA Pictures.

== Plot ==
Kara sees her grandmother always using tarot cards to tell people's fortunes. She is enchanted to try to use it, despite her family's protests. She later plays the tarot that reads that two members of her family will die, which is her father by a stray bullet and grandmother due to a heart attack. Therefore, her mother decides to put the tarot cards on her mother's grave to stop the misfortunes.

Years later, Kara is engaged with her fiancée Miguel and goes into hiking. But she senses something is wrong. Her doubt is proven right, as a storm hits their position and her fiancée is lost in the middle of the storm. She is later rescued by her group. She tries to rebuild her life until her fiancée returns. But after that, several mysterious and horrific events happen to them and they are haunted by a group of ghosts who reveal themselves to be members of a cult who sacrificed themselves due to a fear of being a victim of a disease that bound to end all mankind. Only two women survived, one is her grandmother and another member who will try to help them. Using the tarot card, she tries to solve the problem, only for them to get worse.

Later, they return to the mountains searching for a clue, when an old man, who was her grandfather (and the leader of the cult) warns them, but the ghosts claim one life after another, forcing the old man to kill himself to relieve the ghosts' anguish. But Miguel dies when he falls in a ravine.

Kara returns many months later, pregnant and laying flowers on Miguel's death site.

== Cast ==
- Marian Rivera as Cara
- Dennis Trillo as Miguel
- Roxanne Guinoo as Faye
- Gloria Romero as Lola Auring
- Celia Rodriguez as Lola Nena
- Dante Rivero as El Señor
- Ana Capri as Connie
- Alwyn Uytingco as Sol
- Niña Jose as Young Lola Auring
- Glaiza de Castro as Young Lola Nena
- Rich Asuncion as Young Nana Upeng
- Nikki Samonte as Young Cara
- Ama Quiambao as Nana Upeng
- Susan Africa as Diana
- Ricardo Cepeda as Ronnie
- Malou Crisologo as Myrna

== See also ==
- List of ghost films
