= Cris Daluz =

Filipino actor (1934–2009)

- Born: Crispin Rodriguez Daluz; August 15, 1934; Philippine Islands
- Died: February 12, 2009 (aged 74); Olongapo, Zambales, Philippines
- Years active: 1980–2008
- Known for: Radyo Patrol 11 (reporter of DZMM)

Crispin Rodriguez Daluz (August 15, 1934 – February 12, 2009) was a Filipino actor and reporter. He is known for Himala (1982), Sukob (2006) and Bagong Buwan (2001).

He died on February 12, 2009, in Olongapo, Philippines.

Daluz was the vice president for broadcast by Sports Communicators Organization of the Philippines (SCOOP) in 2001.

He served as secretary of the Actors Guild of the Philippines (Katipunan ng Artistang Pilipino sa Pelikula at Telebisyon) in 2000.

== Selected filmography ==
- Himala (1982) – Igme
- Bulaklak sa City Jail (1984) – Atty. Diaz
- Boots Oyson: Sa Katawan Mo, Aagos ang Dugo (1989)
- Michael and Madonna (1990) – Michael's father
- Bagong Buwan (2001) – Imam
- Sanggano't Sanggago (2001) – Tatang
- Lapu-Lapu (2002) – Father of Katulanga
- All My Life (2004) – Mang Gene
- Spirit of the Glass (2004)
- Sukob (2006) – Dante
- Pamahiin (2006) – Mang Sebring
- Mag-ingat Ka Sa... Kulam (2008) – Albularyo
- Shake, Rattle & Roll X (2008) – Fr. Miguel
