= Pinky Amador =

Filipina actress, singer, commercial model, and TV host (born 1966)

- Born: Pilar Cristina Roxas Amador; March 14, 1966 (age 60); Manila, Philippines
- Occupations: Actress, TV host, singer, model
- Years active: 1986–present
- Agents: Viva Artists Agency (1986–present); Sparkle GMA Artist Center (2020–present)
- Known for: Moira Rutaquio-Tanyag in Abot-Kamay na Pangarap
- Relatives: Manuel Roxas; Manuel L. Quezon; Aurora Aragon-Quezon; John Arcilla; Karina Constantino David; Kara David; Gerry Roxas; Mar Roxas; Korina Sanchez

Pilar Cristina "Pinky" Roxas Amador (born March 14, 1966) is a Filipino actress, singer, commercial model and TV host. She was in the original London cast of the Cameron Mackintosh musical Miss Saigon. She is seen mostly on GMA Network and ABS-CBN. Amador is best known for her role as Moira Rutaquio-Tanyag, the main antagonist of Abot-Kamay na Pangarap.

== Background ==
Pilar Cristina Roxas Amador is the niece of the late Zenaida Amador, the founder of Repertory Philippines. She is the youngest of three children from a Spanish Filipino family. She also graduated master's degree in Theater Arts Bristol Old Vic Theater School.

She is related to former presidents Manuel Roxas and Manuel L. Quezon.

== Acting ==
Amador graduated from Bristol Old Vic Theatre School (an affiliated school of the University of the West of England) with a master's degree in acting, where she was awarded with a Chevening Scholarship due to excellence. Prior to this, she earned her Bachelor of Arts degree in mass communication from Assumption College San Lorenzo. She came to theatre via lead roles in plays I Ought to Be in Pictures, Agnes of God and The Foreigner for which she has won Aliw Awards for Best Stage Actress.

== Awards and nominations ==
- 1983: Agnes of God – Aliw Award for Best Stage Actress
- 1987: The Foreigner – Aliw Award for Best Stage Actress
- 1987: Star Awards nomination for Best Newcomer – Magdusa Ka
- 1997: Parangal ng Bayan (National Young Achiever's Award) for Arts & Culture
- 1998: Urian Award nomination for Best Supporting Actress – Sana'y Pag-ibig Na
- 2011: Zsa Zsa Zaturnah Ze Muzical Vack with a Vengeance – Gawad Buhay Awards for Best Supporting Actress in a Musical
- 2013: Piaf – Aliw Awards nomination for Best Actress in a Musical
- 2020: 43rd Gawad Urian Best Supporting Actress – Ang Hupa – Nominated

== Filmography ==
=== Film ===
Year	Title	Role
1986	Magdusa Ka!	Melete
1987	Anak ng Lupa	Noemi
1987	Balweg	Terry Guerrero
1992	Pangako sa'yo	Dahlia
1992	Alabang Girls	Rose
1994	Kadenang Bulaklak	
1994	Cuadro de Jack	Anna
1996	Kabilin-bilinan ni Lola	
1998	Nagbibinata	Jane Carmona
1998	Sana Pag-ibig Na	
1998	Sambahin ang Ngalan Mo	Pamela
1999	Mamang Shotgun	Jeannie
2000	Nag-aapoy Na Laman	
2000	Madame X	
2000	Ika-13 Kapitulo	Gigi
2001	Sa Iyong Mga Haplos	
2001	Sa Huling Paghihintay	Danica
2001	Halik ng Sirena	Cily
2001	Naked Nights	Stephani
2001	Sugatang Puso	Sely
2001	May Pag-ibig Pa Kaya?	Ditas
2002	Hesus Rebolusyonaryo	Lucia Sarmiento
2002	Halik	Jocelyn
2002	Tampisaw	Bambi
2002	Prosti	Jacky
2002	Sex Files	Daria
2003	Ssshhh... She Walks by Night	
2003	Sukdulan	Vivian
2003	Sex Drive	Sheila's mother
2003	Walang Kapalit	Tere
2003	Ang Tanging Ina	Ina Montecillo
2003	Sa Piling ng mga Belyas	
2003	Nena Inosente	Dasia
2003	Pinay Pie	Kelly
2004	Kuya	Chloe and Grace's mother
2004	Singles	Julia
2004	Beautiful Life	Cita
2004	Forever My Love	Troy's mother
2004	Happily Ever After	Susan
2004	D' Anothers	Mrs. Tuken
2005	Mano Po 4: Ako Legal Wife	Elvie
2006	Blue Moon	Grace
2006	Pacquiao: The Movie	Jinkee/Janet's mother
2006	Eternity	Dina
2007	You Got Me!	Kevin's mother
2007	Angels	Ditas
2007	Maikling Kwento	Zuleita
2008	Loving You	Jackie
2009	Ang Manghuhula	Letty
2010	You to Me Are Everything	Estella Fernandez
2011	Tween Academy: Class of 2012	Anna
2012	My Cactus Heart	Carlo's mother
2013	She's the One	Judith
2017	Can't Help Falling in Love	Alma Aguinaldo
2018	Season of the Devil	Kwago
2020	Four Sisters Before the Wedding	Mrs. Linda Malvar
2021	Love or Money	Tita Lorena
2023	Ako si Ninoy	Mrs. Esmeralda Argos
2024	G! LU	
2024	Huwag Mo 'Kong Iwan	Mrs. Lao
2025	Kontrabida Academy	Language Teacher

=== Television / Digital Series ===
Year	Title	Role
1993	Head Over Heels	Suni
1994	Bisperas ng Kasaysayan	Ma. Consuelo
1996	Bayani	Alberta
1996–2001	Anna Karenina	Margarita "Maggie" Monteclaro
2001-2002	Sa Dulo ng Walang Hanggan	Myrna
2003	Click	Marge
2003	Twin Hearts	Murielle Brillo
2003	Wansapanataym: Mummy's Girl	Susan
2003	Wansapanataym: Wake up, Little Rosie, Wake up	Luna / Miss Wanda
2004	Mangarap Ka	Junie Moon
2005	Encantadia	Carmen
2006	Pinakamamahal	Margie Crismundo
2006	Mars Ravelo's Captain Barbell	Myra Lazaro
2007	Sine Novela: Pati Ba Pintig ng Puso	Doña Nena
2008	Zaido: Pulis Pangkalawakan	Armida / Armida Impostor
2008	Sine Novela: Maging Akin Ka Lamang	Carmen Paruel
2008–2009	Sine Novela: Saan Darating ang Umaga?	Agatha Rodrigo
2009–2010	Sine Novela: Kaya Kong Abutin ang Langit	Doña Monina Arnaldo-Gardamonte
2010	Diva	Sister Leonora
2010	Love Bug Presents: The Last Romance	Greta de Jesus
2010	Elena M. Patron's Momay	Molly Corpuz
2010	Magkaribal	Carmen Sotto
2010	Your Song Presents: Andi	Malou
2011	Reel Love Presents: Tween Hearts	Liwayway
2011	Guns and Roses	Aretha Aguilar
2011	Maalaala Mo Kaya: Itak	Rosella
2012	Mundo Man ay Magunaw	Matilda La Peña
2012	My Daddy Dearest	Mercedes Adonis
2012–2013	Magdalena: Anghel sa Putikan	Madame Z
2013	Be Careful with My Heart	Zenaida Belmonte
2013	Annaliza	Tessie Garcia
2013	Wansapanataym: Copy Kat	Mommy
2013	Maalaala Mo Kaya: Family Picture	Isidra
2014	Innamorata	Delia Cunanan
2014	Imbestigador: Baguio Massacre	
2014	Hawak Kamay	Wilma Agustin
2015	Forevermore	Sheree San Juan-Grande
2015	Ipaglaban Mo!: Sigaw Ng Katarungan	Alicia Solomon
2015	Imbestigador: Serial Robber/Rapist	
2015	Buena Familia	Sandra Atendido
2015	Karelasyon: Losyang	Tere's mother
2016	Ipaglaban Mo!: Pagnanasa	Louise's mother
2016	Maalaala Mo Kaya: Popcorn	Nelda
2016	Magpahanggang Wakas	Thea Galvez
2017	Wildflower	Esmeralda De Guzman-Ardiente
2017	Ikaw Lang ang Iibigin	Filomena Flores-Torres
2018	La Luna Sangre	Geneva Del Pino
2018	Sana Dalawa ang Puso	Adele Laureano
2018	Maalaala Mo Kaya: Manibela	Helly
2018	Ipaglaban Mo!	Caridad
2018–2019	Precious Hearts Romances Presents: Los Bastardos	Pilar Perez
2019	Tadhana: Obsession	Wilma
2019	Sahaya	Estela Silverio-del Sol
2019	Maalaala Mo Kaya: Sunflower	Melba
2020	Anak ni Waray vs. Anak ni Biday	young Zenaida
2020	Bawal na Game Show	Herself
2021	Daddy's Gurl	Tamisia Buendia
2022; 2024	Jose and Maria's Bonggang Villa	Janice Villa
2022	Flower of Evil	Maggie
2022	Lyric and Beat	Sonja
2022	Tadhana: Kambal Kaagaw	Stella
2022–2024	Abot-Kamay na Pangarap	Moira Rutaquio-Tanyag / Morgana Go (de facto)
2024	Magpakailanman: Taylor Made Success - The John Mac Lane Coronel Story	Fe Coronel
2025	Binibining Marikit	Soraya Torres-Sharma
2026	Apoy sa Dugo	Sylvia Panganiban

=== Theatrical shows ===
Year	Title	Role
-	Miss Saigon: London	Eclea
2013	Piaf	Edith Piaf
