= My Bestfriend's Girlfriend =

- Official movie poster
- Directed by: Mark A. Reyes V
- Screenplay by: Suzette Doctolero
- Produced by: Roselle Monteverde-Teo; Jose Mari Abacan
- Starring: Richard Gutierrez; Marian Rivera
- Cinematography: Ely Balce
- Edited by: Tara Illenberger
- Music by: Vincent de Jesus
- Production companies: Regal Films; GMA Films
- Distributed by: Regal Films
- Release date: February 13, 2008
- Running time: 115 minutes
- Country: Philippines
- Languages: Filipino; English
- Box office: ₱107 million

My Bestfriend's Girlfriend is a 2008 Filipino romantic comedy film directed by Mark Reyes from a script by Suzette Doctolero. The film stars Richard Gutierrez and Marian Rivera.

== Synopsis ==
After an awkward yet memorable encounter at a stag party, Evo (Richard Gutierrez) and Grace (Marian Rivera) thought they would never see each other again. Little did they know that Grace is actually the girlfriend of Evo's best friend, Mark (JC de Vera). As the arrogant player that he is, Evo takes advantage of what happened at the party to make Grace agree to his demands. He forces Grace to pretend as his girlfriend to make Akiko (Ehra Madrigal), his ex, jealous.

== Cast and characters ==
=== Main cast ===
- Marian Rivera as Grace Villaflor
- Richard Gutierrez as Primitivo "Evo" Gonzales
- JC de Vera as Mark Abo
- Ehra Madrigal as Akiko Solon
- Pilar Pilapil as Olivia, Evo's mom
- Deborah Sun as Delia
- Paolo Paraiso as Brando
- JC Cuadrado as Jeffrey
- Renz Valerio as Christian
- Alex Castro as Jun
- Josef Marcelo as Mike
- Marco Morales as Dave Ros
- Benjie Paras as Dindo
- Chariz Solomon as Chicky Chicks
- Diana Malahay as Dindi
- Ysa Villar as Lyka
- Rye Fariñas as Lyka's BF
- Schinina Juban as Lizzie
- Arnold Saulon as Polly

== Reception ==
The film received positive reviews, notably receiving a grade B from the Cinema Evaluation Board (CEB) of the Philippines. The board praised the film's unique take on romantic comedies and the strong performances of the lead stars, Richard Gutierrez and Marian Rivera. The final gross of the movie was 107 million pesos.

== Soundtrack ==
- "My Bestfriend's Girlfriend" title track performed by Introvoys
- "All I Need" performed by Shamrock
- "Why Can't It Be" performed by 3rd Avenue

== Awards and nominations ==
- 6th Golden Screen Awards
  - Best Motion Picture—Musical or Comedy - Nominated
  - Best Performance by an Actress in a Leading Role—Musical or Comedy - Marian Rivera - Nominated
  - Breakthrough Performance by an Actress - Chariz Solomon - Nominated
- 40th Box Office Entertainment Awards
  - Valentine Box Office King - Richard Gutierrez
  - Valentine Box Office Queen - Marian Rivera
- 25th PMPC Star Awards for Movies
  - New Movie Actress of the Year - Chariz Solomon - Nominated
  - Original Movie Song - My Bestfriend's Girlfriend by Introvoys - Nominated

== Awards ==
Year	Award-giving body	Category	Work	Result
2009	GMMSF Box-Office Entertainment Awards	Valentine Box-Office King & Queen	Richard Gutierrez and Marian Rivera	Won
