= Rewind (2023 film) =

2023 drama film by Mae Cruz-Alviar

- Theatrical release poster
- Directed by: Mae Cruz-Alviar
- Screenplay by: Enrico C. Santos
- Story by: Enrico C. Santos; Joel Mercado
- Produced by: Carmi G. Raymundo; Daisy Cayanan-Mejares; Camille G. Montaño; Marjorie B. Lachica
- Starring: Dingdong Dantes; Marian Rivera
- Cinematography: Neil Daza
- Edited by: Marya Ignacio
- Music by: Francis Concio
- Production companies: Star Cinema; APT Entertainment; AgostoDos Pictures
- Distributed by: ABS-CBN Film Productions
- Release date: December 25, 2023
- Running time: 112 minutes
- Country: Philippines
- Language: Filipino
- Box office: ₱924 million

Rewind is a 2023 Philippine romantic drama film directed by Mae Cruz-Alviar and written by Enrico C. Santos from a story concept he co-developed with Joel Mercado. It stars Dingdong Dantes as a man who is given a chance to travel back in time to save his wife (played by Dantes' real-life wife Marian Rivera) from an accident and fix their deteriorating relationship. The supporting cast includes Via Antonio, Ina Feleo, Joross Gamboa, Pepe Herrera, Jordan Lim, Lito Pimentel, Sue Ramirez, Coney Reyes and Ariel Ureta. The film was co-produced by Star Cinema, Agosto Dos Media, and APT Entertainment.

Rewind premiered on December 25, 2023 at the 49th Metro Manila Film Festival to a generally positive critical reception. With a total gross of ₱924 million, it became the highest-grossing film in the history of the festival, the highest-grossing Philippine film of 2023 and the highest-grossing Philippine film of all time until it was surpassed by Hello, Love, Again in 2024.

== Plot ==
John, a diligent but emotionally distant office worker, resigns after his boss, Hermie, promotes his coworker Vivian over him. Vivian then visits John at his office and they share a kiss. The following day, John and his wife, Mary, argue about his resignation and his infidelity with Vivian, which Mary discovered via a video recorded by John's colleague, Hannah. Distracted, John crashes their car, tragically killing Mary at 3:00 PM. Due to Mary's death, his son Austin moves in with his grandmother, leaving John alone at home to reminisce the times he had with his late wife as he heavily drinks and smokes.

One night, a drunken John encounters Jess, an electrician from Austin's school nicknamed "Lods" who strikingly resembles Jesus Christ. John discovers Mary had hired Jess for his surprise birthday party. Lods later reveals himself to be Jesus in disguise and offers John a chance to travel back in time to save Mary and rectify his past mistakes, with the condition that someone must die that day. John agrees, offering his own life. Transported back to Hermie's birthday party (the day he was passed over for promotion), John makes different choices. He calmly accepts being sidelined, rebuffs Vivian's advances, and prevents Hannah from recording any compromising interactions. He then reconciles with his estranged father and gives his son, Austin, his blessing to pursue a career as a pianist, encouraging him to take Mary out on a date.

The next morning, John discovers Mary's plans to enroll in culinary school in Singapore, taking Austin, who was accepted into a music academy there, with her. Mary asserts her desire to pursue her own dreams, leaving John feeling that his sacrifices have been in vain. He confronts Lods, who is setting up lights in the yard. Lods chastises John's selfishness and offers to reverse time, allowing Mary to die as initially fated, but John refuses. Later, on their way to Austin's play, John gives Mary his heartfelt blessing to pursue her dreams with their son in Singapore. At the critical moment of the accident, John deftly avoids the collision with the tree, saving Mary's life.

While watching Austin's play, John spots Lods in the audience, a chilling reminder that it's almost 3:00 p.m., the moment Mary was meant to die. Outside in the hallway, John pleads for his life, but ultimately accepts his fate after Lods assures him his death will inspire Mary to become a successful restaurateur and Austin a renowned pianist who dedicates his performances to his father's memory. Lods grants him a final wish: to see the end of his son's play.

Back in the auditorium, John watches as Austin dedicates his performance to his parents. John moves to embrace him, but Austin walks past him, rushing into the hall. Following, John finds Austin and Mary hovering over his collapsed body, and a dawning, somber realization washes over him: he is already dead. He then steps into a bright, inviting light, signaling his journey to the afterlife. At John's wake, Mary delivers a heartfelt eulogy as Austin plays the piano, honoring his father's final wishes. Years later, both Mary and Austin thrive in their successful careers. After bidding farewell to Austin, now with a family of his own, an elderly Mary shares a poignant dance with John's spirit, a testament to enduring love and the profound impact of his sacrifice.

== Cast ==
Cast

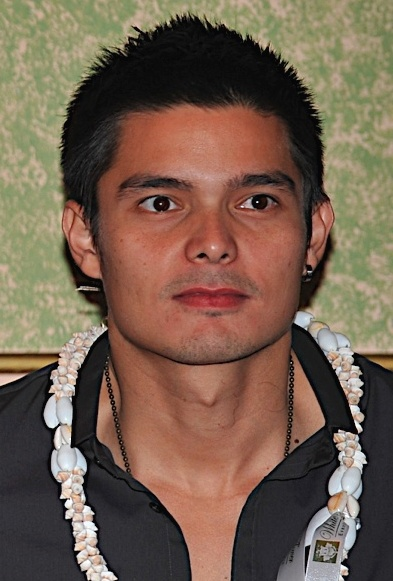
Dingdong Dantes as John Nuñez

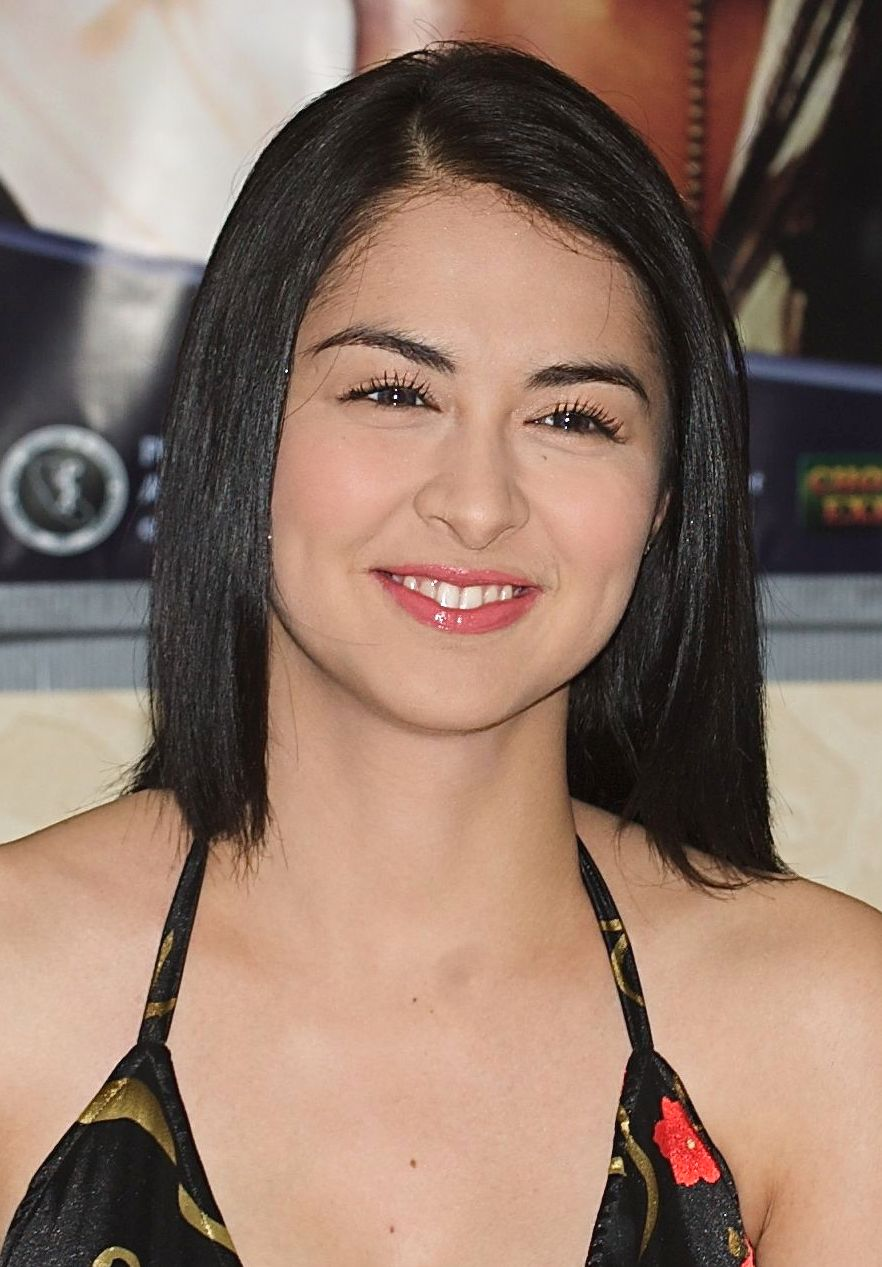
Marian Rivera as Mary Nuñez

- Dingdong Dantes as John Nuñez, Mary’s husband, who shifted his priorities from being a family man to a workaholic man aspiring for promotion.
  - Jeremiah Cruz as Young John
- Marian Rivera as Mary Nuñez, John's wife, who had to give up her promising career as a chef in order to become a full-time housewife.
  - Enicka Xaria Orbe as Young Mary
- Jordan Lim as Austin Nuñez, Mary and John's son who has a passion for playing the piano.
  - Alonzo Muhlach as child Austin
  - JC Alcantara plays as the adult version of Austin Nuñez.
- Pepe Herrera as Lods, who turns out to be Jesus who poses as Jess, an electrician hired by Mary, and who gave John a chance to go back in time, albeit with a caveat.
- Coney Reyes as Leonora, Mary's mother.
- Ariel Ureta as Hermie, John and Mary's godfather at their wedding, who is also the company president where John works.
- Lito Pimentel as Nestor, John's estranged father.
- Ina Feleo as Aurora, one of Mary's close friends.
- Joross Gamboa as Lucio, one of John's subordinates.
- Sue Ramirez as Vivian Pastrana, John's younger colleague, who is attracted to him.
- Pamu Pamorada as Hannah, John's assistant.
- Shanaia Gomez as Austin's future wife.

== Production ==
On June 21, 2023, Star Cinema announced through a media press conference that Rewind, written by Enrico Santos and directed by Mae Cruz-Alviar, will be top-billed by GMA Network's exclusive talents and celebrity couple Dingdong Dantes and Marian Rivera and to be co-produced with the former's production company Agosto Dos Media and APT Entertainment. Cruz-Alviar had previously worked with Dantes on the 2013 film She's the One. Carmi Raymundo served as the film's creative director. Enrico Santos is the scriptwriter for the film. He said that the material for Rewind was conceptualized prior to the COVID-19 pandemic. Although the screenplay was completed by 2020, filming was delayed because of the pandemic. According to APT Entertainment president Mike Tuviera, the project was first presented to Dantes and Rivera in late 2019 alongside about ten other story ideas, but Santos' screenplay immediately stood out to the couple. Cruz-Alviar described the film as a family drama with elements of "magical realism".

Rivera said she committed to the project despite scheduling challenges because she was deeply moved by the screenplay, describing it as a film that would make her and Dantes' children proud. She recalled crying while reading the script, prompting her mother to ask whether something was wrong, and later shared a photo of herself in tears with Dantes. Rivera also said that reuniting with Dantes on screen after 13 years allowed them to support each other during emotionally demanding scenes. She added that she felt a personal connection to her character, because of their shared devotion to their families. According to a report by Deadline Hollywood, the film was produced on a budget of more than US$1 million (₱55 million). Dantes and Rivera also invested their own money in the film through AgostoDos Pictures, which Dantes founded in 2011.

The film also stars Ina Feleo, Joross Gamboa, Pepe Herrera, Jordan Lim, Lito Pimentel, Sue Ramirez, Coney Reyes and Ariel Ureta in supporting roles. Alonzo Muhlach portrays the child version of Austin, while JC Alcantara plays the adult Austin, and Enicka Xaria Orbe and Jeremiah Cruz portray the young Mary and John, respectively. On July 10, 2023, the committee chose the film as one of the first four official entries for the 49th Metro Manila Film Festival. On September 21, 2023, lead actor Dingdong Dantes posted on his Instagram account some snippets of the film's wedding scene with captions implying that it was the first day of production. Ben&Ben's "Sa Susunod Na Habang Buhay" served as the film's main theme song.

== Release ==
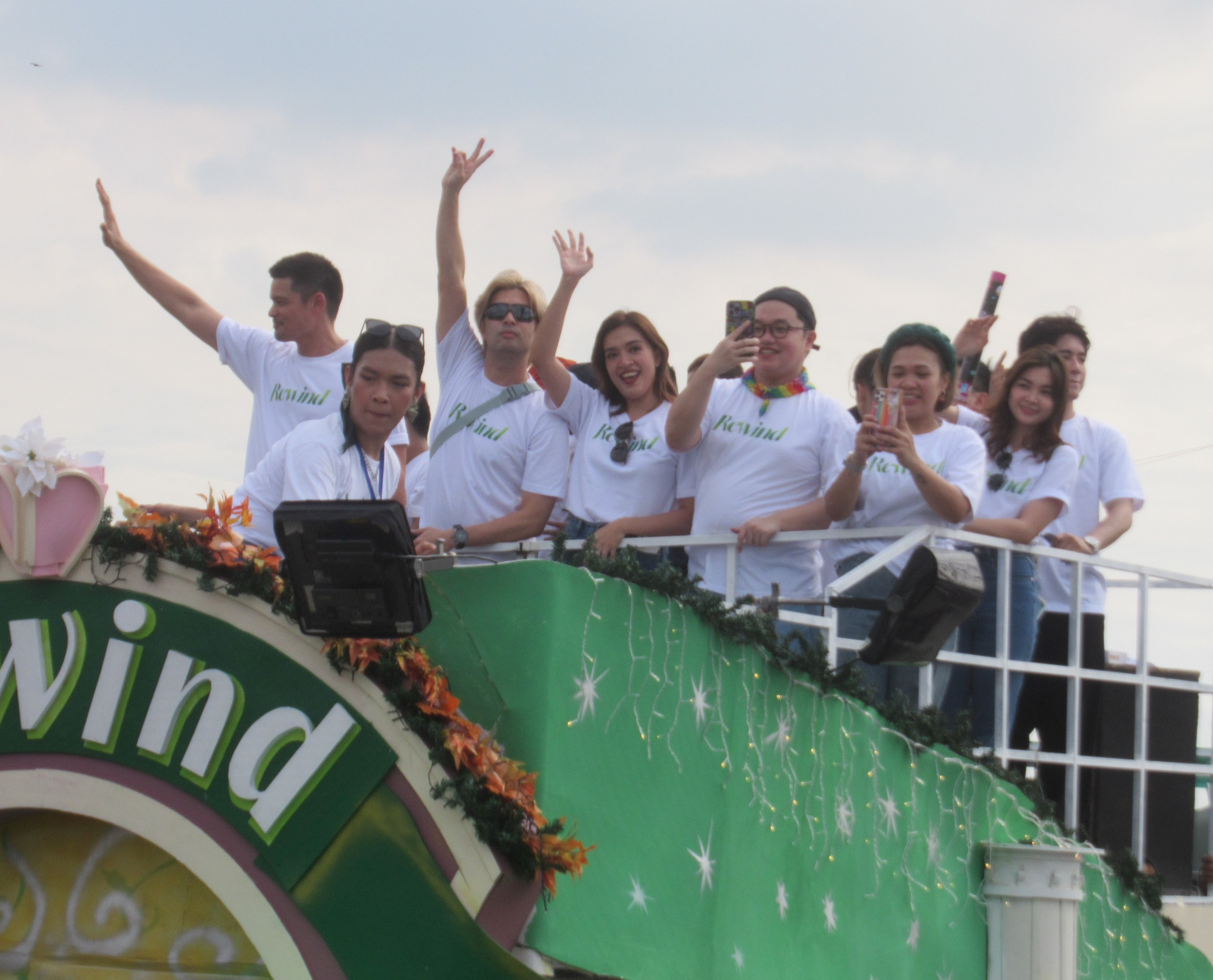
Cast members on the parade float for the 2023 MMFF

The official 90-second teaser of the film was released on November 13, 2023. On November 23, 2023, an official poster was unveiled to the public with the presence of the lead couple, and was later uploaded on the social media platform accounts of Star Cinema and other related divisions of ABS-CBN. On December 4, 2023, a full official trailer was released by Star Cinema.

Rewind premiered in cinemas in the Philippines on December 25, 2023, as one of the official entries of the 49th Metro Manila Film Festival. It was also released internationally in 270 cinemas, including those in the Australia, Canada, Guam, New Zealand, Philippines, Saipan, Singapore, United Arab Emirates, and United States. In February 2024, the film received a special screening in Hong Kong. On March 25, 2024, Rewind was released on Netflix among other 2023 Metro Manila Film Festival entries on the following scheduled dates, and also the following day, the exclusive deleted scenes of the film were released on Star Cinema's social media accounts.

== Reception ==
=== Box office ===
Rewind grossed ₱924 million in its entire theatrical run. During the first week of the 2023 Metro Manila Film Festival, Rewind was reported as the festival's top-grossing film, while the ten entries collectively earned more than ₱600 million. On January 17, ABS-CBN and Star Cinema announced that the film had earned ₱815 million in domestic sales and ₱845 million in combined domestic and international sales. It surpassed the domestic gross of Hello, Love, Goodbye (2019) to become the highest-grossing Philippine film in domestic box-office sales. On January 30, Star Cinema announced that Rewind had reached ₱902 million in worldwide gross, making it the first Philippine film to surpass ₱900 million at the box office, until it was surpassed by Hello, Love, Again in November 2024.

=== Critical reception ===
Critical reception for the film was mostly positive, with particular praise given to its cast's performances and script. According to review aggregator Kritikultura, the film obtained a score of 70/100 based on 23 reviews, indicating a generally positive reception. Following its release on Netflix in March 2024, Rewind reached a wider audience and became the platform's most-watched film in the Philippines.

Many critics have compared its plot to the 2004 film If Only. Bum Tenorio of The Philippine Star wrote in his review, "Rewind is the full stop of the heart that finds it hard to forgive—and later on realizes, albeit late, that forgiveness is not an option but the only choice in order to move on." University of Santo Tomas college newspaper, The Varsitarian, praised Pepe Herrera for his casual performance as Lods, saying that, "[a] more serious characterization would have ruined the story." Fred Hawson, writing in his blog, gave the film a seven, praising its director Mae Cruz-Alviar for the film's emotional climaxes, as well as the performances of Dingdong Dantes and Marian Rivera, saying, "it was their affecting performances that gave this film its special radiance beyond its familiar plot." He expressed reservation about the character Lods.

Philbert Dy of Spot.ph gave the film two and a half stars out of five, writing that the film's execution of its main plot about death and tragedy "stands on some shaky ground thematically and theologically." Jason Tan Liwag of Rappler compared the film to classics like It's a Wonderful Life and Groundhog Day, but said that Rewind lacks their humor. He described it as "straightforward, if simplistic," and that Cruz-Alviar capitalized on the two leads' chemistry, nostalgia, and Catholic moralism.

=== Accolades ===
Accolades received by Rewind
Year	Award	Category	Recipient(s)	Result	Ref.
2023	2023 Metro Manila Film Festival	Best Director	Mae Cruz-Alviar	Nominated	
2023	2023 Metro Manila Film Festival	Best Actor	Dingdong Dantes	Nominated	
2023	2023 Metro Manila Film Festival	Best Actress	Marian Rivera	Nominated	
2023	2023 Metro Manila Film Festival	Best Supporting Actor	Pepe Herrera	Nominated	
2023	2023 Metro Manila Film Festival	Best Child Performer	Jordan Lim	Nominated	
2024	Platinum Stallion Media Awards	Drama Film of the Year	Rewind	Won	
2024	Platinum Stallion Media Awards	Best Film Actress	Marian Rivera	Won	
2024	Manila International Film Festival	Best Actor	Dingdong Dantes	Won	
2024	Manila International Film Festival	Best Supporting Actor	Pepe Herrera	Won	
2024	Box Office Entertainment Awards	Phenomenal Box Office Star	Dingdong Dantes & Marian Rivera	Won	
2024	Box Office Entertainment Awards	Film Actor of the Year	Dingdong Dantes	Won	
2024	Box Office Entertainment Awards	Most Popular Loveteam for Movies	Dingdong Dantes & Marian Rivera	Won	
2024	Box Office Entertainment Awards	Most Popular Film Producers	Star Cinema (ABS-CBN Film Productions, Inc.) & APT Entertainment, AgostoDos Pictures	Won	
2024	Box Office Entertainment Awards	Most Popular Film Screenwriter	Mae Cruz-Alviar	Won	
2024	Box Office Entertainment Awards	Most Popular Film Director	Enrico Santos	Won	
2024	FAMAS Awards	Best Picture	Rewind	Nominated	
2024	FAMAS Awards	Best Director	Mae Cruz-Alviar	Nominated	
2024	FAMAS Awards	Best Actor	Dingdong Dantes	Nominated	
2024	FAMAS Awards	Best Actress	Marian Rivera	Nominated	
2024	FAMAS Awards	Best Supporting Actor	Pepe Herrera	Nominated	
2024	FAMAS Awards	Best Child Actor	Jordan Lim	Nominated	
2024	FAMAS Awards	Best Cinematography	Rewind	Nominated	
2024	FAMAS Awards	Best Editing	Marga Ignacio	Nominated	
2024	FAMAS Awards	Best Sound	Narra Post-Production	Won	
2024	FAMAS Awards	Best Musical Score	Francis Concio	Nominated	
2024	FAMAS Awards	Bida ng Takilya Award	Dingdong Dantes & Marian Rivera	Won	
2024	The EDDYS	Best Actor	Dingdong Dantes	Nominated	
2024	The EDDYS	Best Actress	Marian Rivera	Nominated	
2024	The EDDYS	Best Sound	Mien Sparks	Nominated	
2024	The EDDYS	Box Office Heroes	Dingdong Dantes & Marian Rivera	Won	
