= My Guardian Alien =

2024 Philippine television drama series

- Title card
- Genre: Science fiction drama
- Created by: Suzette Doctolero; Melchor F. Escarcha
- Written by: Anna Aleta-Nadela; Geng Delgado; Onay Sales-Camero
- Directed by: Zig Madamba Dulay
- Creative director: Aloy Adlawan
- Starring: Marian Rivera
- Theme music composer: Natasha L. Corroes
- Opening theme: "Nagbago ang Daigdig" by Zephanie Dimaranan
- Country of origin: Philippines
- Original language: Tagalog
- No. of episodes: 65

Production
- Executive producer: Rosie Lyn M. Atienza
- Cinematography: Miguel Antonio Cruz
- Editors: Florenz Matthew Amisola; Noel Mauricio; Vincent Valenzuela
- Camera setup: Multiple-camera setup
- Running time: 23–38 minutes
- Production company: GMA Entertainment Group

Original release
- Network: GMA Network
- Release: April 1 – June 28, 2024

My Guardian Alien is a 2024 Philippine television drama science fiction series broadcast by GMA Network. Directed by Zig Madamba Dulay, it stars Marian Rivera in the title role. It premiered on April 1, 2024 on the network's Prime line up. The series concluded on June 28, 2024, with a total of 65 episodes.

Originally titled as Against All Odds, it was later renamed to My Guardian Alien. The series is streaming online on YouTube.

== Premise ==
Katherine gets killed in a shooting accident. During her funeral, a "pod" falls on planet Earth which contains an alien, who will take Katherine's form.

== Cast and characters ==
Cast

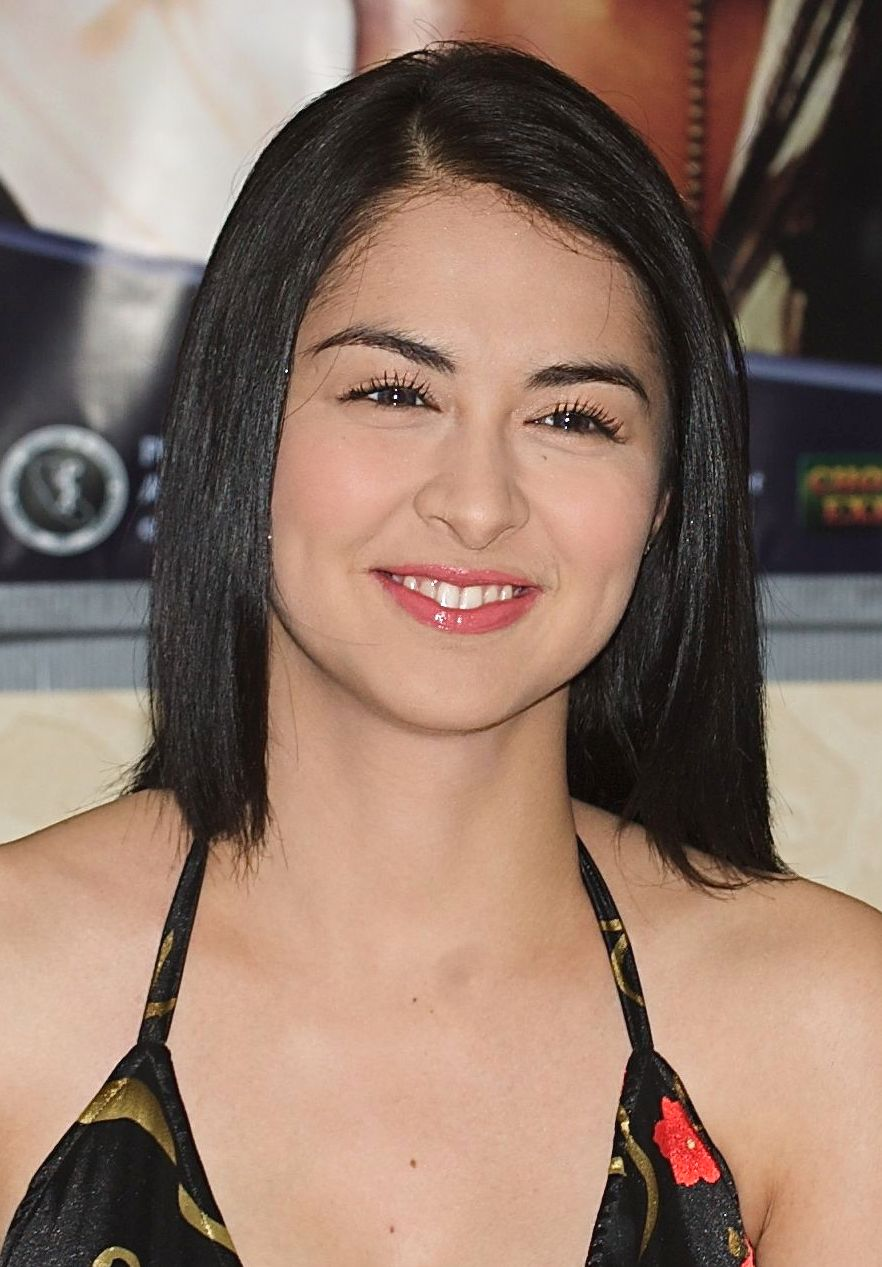
Marian Rivera

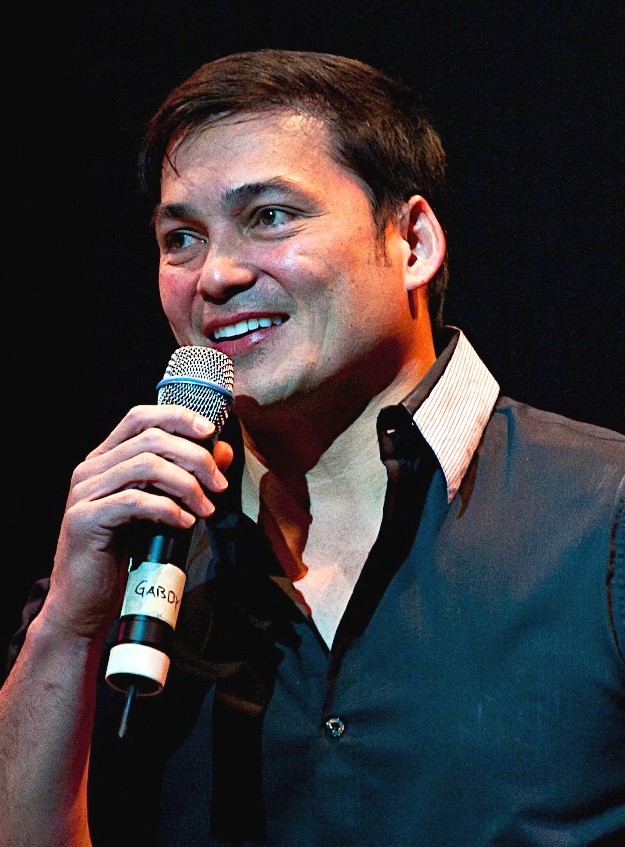
Gabby Concepcion

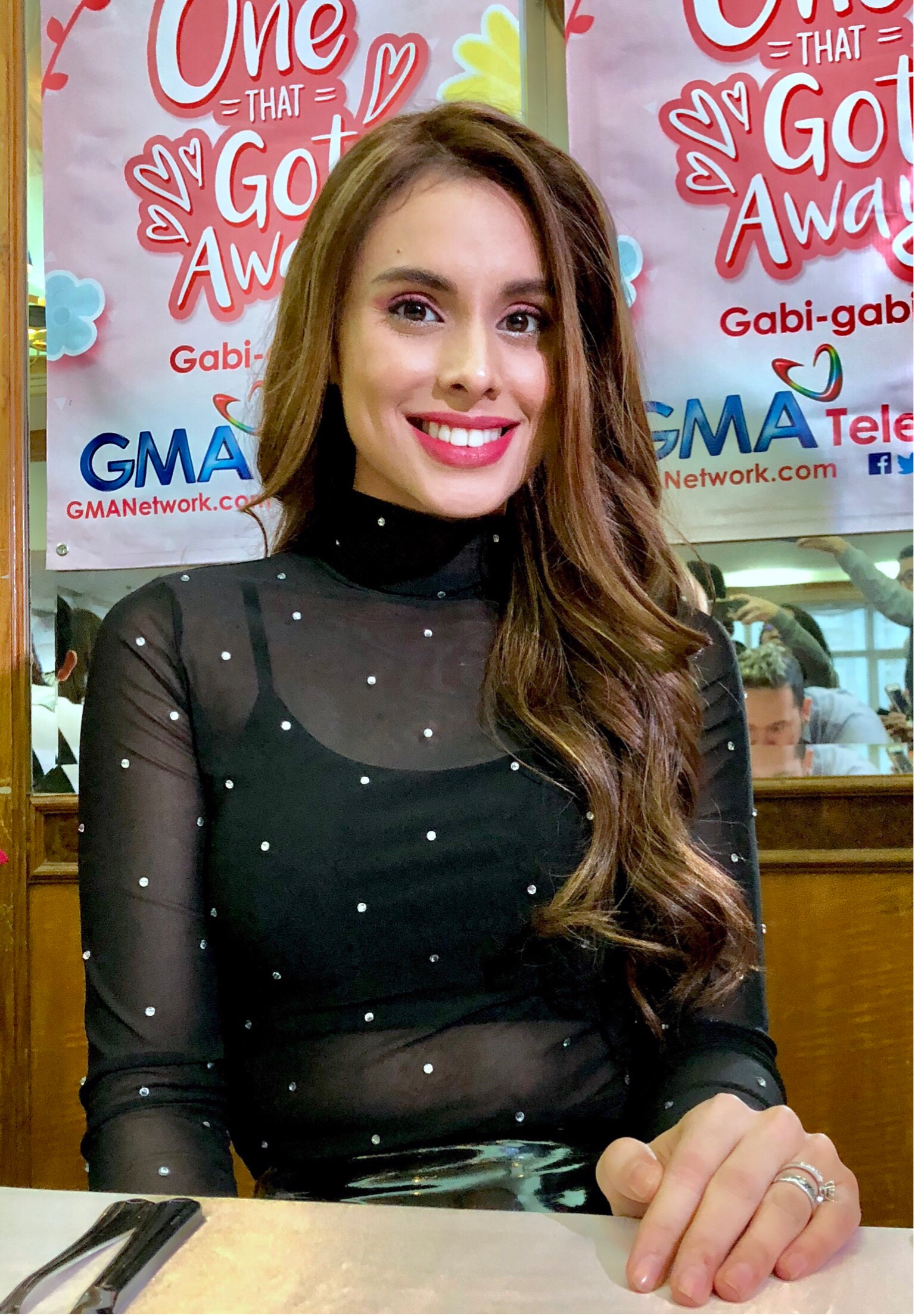
Max Collins

Lead cast

- Marian Rivera as Katherine Villegas-Soriano / 11-1-20-8-5-22-9-12-5 / Grace B. Formin / Mommy Two

Supporting cast

- Gabby Concepcion as Carlos Soriano
- Max Collins as Venus del Rosario
- Raphael Landicho as Adrian "Doy" Soriano
- Gabby Eigenmann as Cepheus "Ceph" Corona
- Caitlyn Stave as Halley del Rosario
- Josh Ford as Aries
- Kiray Celis as Marites
- Arnold Reyes as Minggoy
- Tanya Gomez as Isay
- Sean Lucas as Kevin
- Marissa Delgado as Nova Soriano

Guest cast

- Maricar de Mesa as younger Nova
- Ana Marin as Aurora "Auring" Vega-Corona
- Tart Carlos as Karen
- Christian Antolin as Sputnik
- Kirst Viray as Delfin
- Analyn Barro as Aera Simmons
- Shanelle Agustin as Emily
- Jericho Arceo as Ikong
- Richard Arellano as Generoso
- Luke Conde as Vega / Arnold
- Anne Garcia as Ofel
- Kitsi Pagaspas as Belen
- Ira Ruzz as Jenny
- Ryan Sandoval as Chito
- Orlando Sol as Isko
- Richard Arellano as Generoso
- Rodjun Cruz as a dancer
- Juan Rodrigo as Tiago
- Rochelle Barrameda as Juliet
- Anjay Anson as Sandro
- Stanley Abuloc as Tonyo / 11-15-2-12-78-15-22-31-12

== Episodes ==
My Guardian Alien episodes
No.	Title	Original release date
1	"World Premiere"	April 1, 2024
2	"Paano Makaka-move On?" (transl. how to move on?)	April 2, 2024
3	"Ang Pagdating" (transl. the arrival)	April 3, 2024
4	"Tao Nga Ba?" (transl. is it human?)	April 4, 2024
5	"Memories"	April 5, 2024
6	"First Encounter"	April 8, 2024
7	"Super Hero"	April 9, 2024
8	"Mommy Two"	April 10, 2024
9	"How to Hide an Alien?"	April 11, 2024
10	"Boses ni Katherine" (transl. voice of Katherine)	April 12, 2024
11	"Protect Doy"	April 15, 2024
12	"Fight, Fight, Fight"	April 16, 2024
13	"Cheers"	April 17, 2024
14	"Carlos Meets Alien"	April 18, 2024
15	"Alien Encounter"	April 19, 2024
16	"Peace Offering"	April 22, 2024
17	"Ghost Hunting"	April 23, 2024
18	"Babang Luksa" (transl. death anniversary)	April 24, 2024
19	"The Search"	April 25, 2024
20	"Together Again"	April 26, 2024
21	"Hello, Grace"	April 29, 2024
22	"Time to Recharge"	April 30, 2024
23	"Invasion of Privacy"	May 1, 2024
24	"Surprise"	May 2, 2024
25	"Confrontation"	May 3, 2024
26	"Alien Dance"	May 6, 2024
27	"Riot sa Bar" (transl. riot at the bar)	May 7, 2024
28	"Lesson in Fear"	May 8, 2024
29	"Rejection"	May 9, 2024
30	"Crush Landing"	May 10, 2024
31	"Confession"	May 13, 2024
32	"First LQ"	May 14, 2024
33	"Connection"	May 15, 2024
34	"Truth Serum"	May 16, 2024
35	"Best Day Ever"	May 17, 2024
36	"Parental Guidance"	May 20, 2024
37	"Bitter Ampalaya" transl. bitter bitter melon	May 21, 2024
38	"Snaky Moves"	May 22, 2024
39	"Rage"	May 23, 2024
40	"Resbak" (transl. retaliation)	May 24, 2024
41	"Scheme"	May 27, 2024
42	"Traydor" (transl. traitor)	May 28, 2024
43	"Matinding Duda" (transl. strong doubt)	May 29, 2024
44	"Rebelasyon" (transl. revelation)	May 30, 2024
45	"Backfire"	May 31, 2024
46	"Guilty as Hell"	June 3, 2024
47	"Truth and Lies"	June 4, 2024
48	"The Confession"	June 5, 2024
49	"Dark Secrets"	June 6, 2024
50	"Taken"	June 7, 2024
51	"Tuso" (transl. cunning)	June 10, 2024
52	"Special Glue"	June 11, 2024
53	"FH Virus"	June 12, 2024
54	"The Proposal"	June 13, 2024
55	"Friend or Spy?"	June 14, 2024
56	"Sukdulan" (transl. extreme)	June 17, 2024
57	"In Danger"	June 18, 2024
58	"Missing"	June 19, 2024
59	"Saving Doy"	June 20, 2024
60	"Huling Pasabog" (transl. final surprise)	June 21, 2024
61	"I Do or Die"	June 24, 2024
62	"Pagsisisi" (transl. regret)	June 25, 2024
63	"Huling Buhay" (transl. final life)	June 26, 2024
64	"Touched By an Alien"	June 27, 2024
65	"Unexpected Grace"	June 28, 2024

== Production ==
Principal photography commenced in August 2023.

== Ratings ==
According to AGB Nielsen Philippines' Nationwide Urban Television Audience Measurement People in television homes, the pilot episode of My Guardian Alien earned an 11.1% rating. The final episode scored a 10.7% rating.

== Accolades ==
Accolades received by My Guardian Alien
Year	Award	Category	Recipient	Result	Ref.
2025	36th PMPC Star Awards for Television	Best Drama Actress	Marian Rivera	Pending	
2025	36th PMPC Star Awards for Television	Best Drama Supporting Actor	Arnold Reyes	Pending	
2025	36th PMPC Star Awards for Television	Best New Male TV Personality	Raphael Landicho	Pending	
