= Tweets for My Sweet =

2012 Philippine television sitcom series

- Title card
- Genre: Sitcom
- Created by: Joseph Balboa
- Directed by: Uro dela Cruz
- Starring: Marian Rivera
- Opening theme: "Tweets for My Sweet" by Kyla
- Country of origin: Philippines
- Original language: Tagalog
- No. of episodes: 16

Production
- Executive producer: Jan Navarro
- Production locations: Manila, Philippines
- Camera setup: Multiple-camera setup
- Running time: 42 minutes
- Production company: GMA Entertainment TV

Original release
- Network: GMA Network
- Release: May 6 – August 19, 2012

Tweets for My Sweet is a 2012 Philippine television sitcom series broadcast by GMA Network. Directed by Uro dela Cruz, it stars Marian Rivera. It premiered on May 6, 2012. The series concluded on August 19, 2012, with a total 16 episodes.

The series is streaming online on YouTube.

== Cast and characters ==
Cast

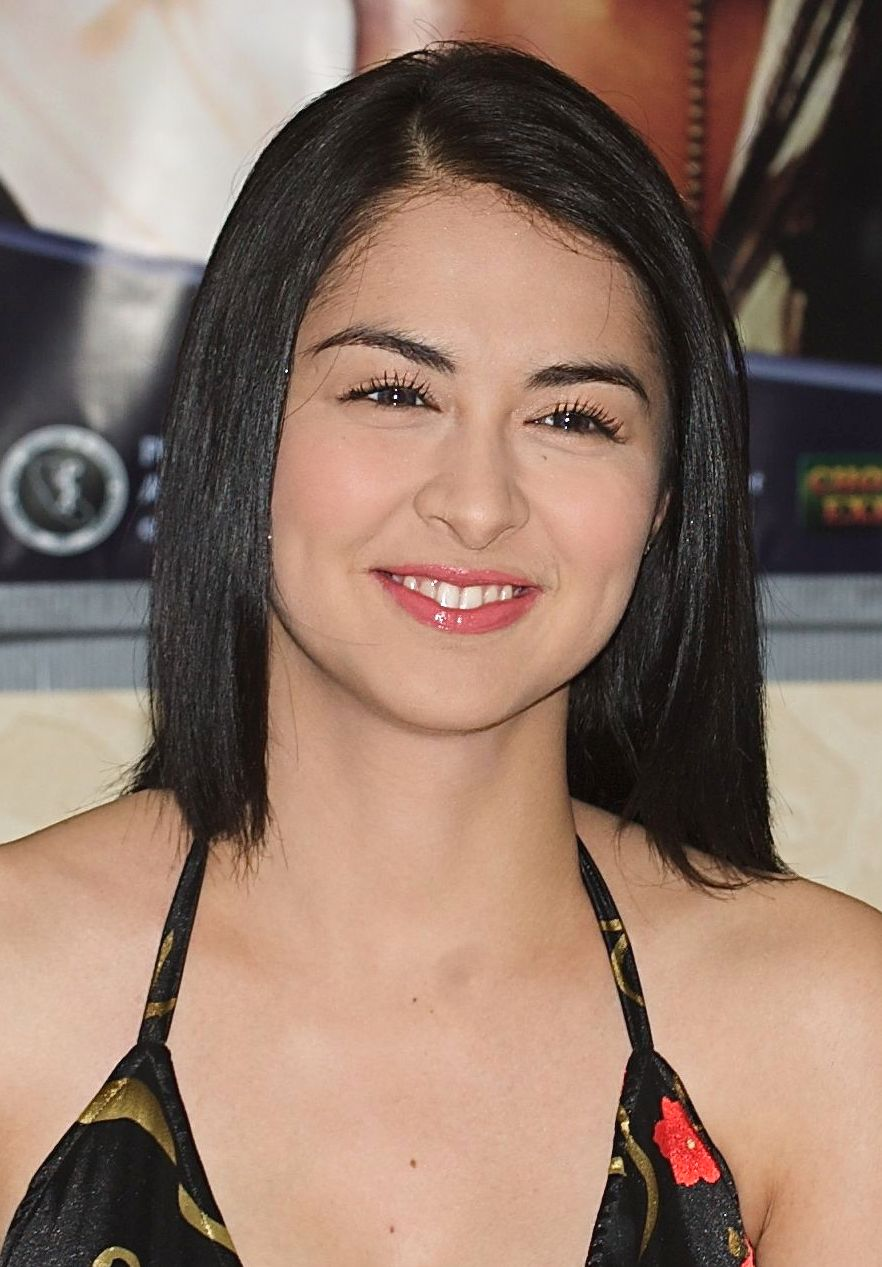
Marian Rivera

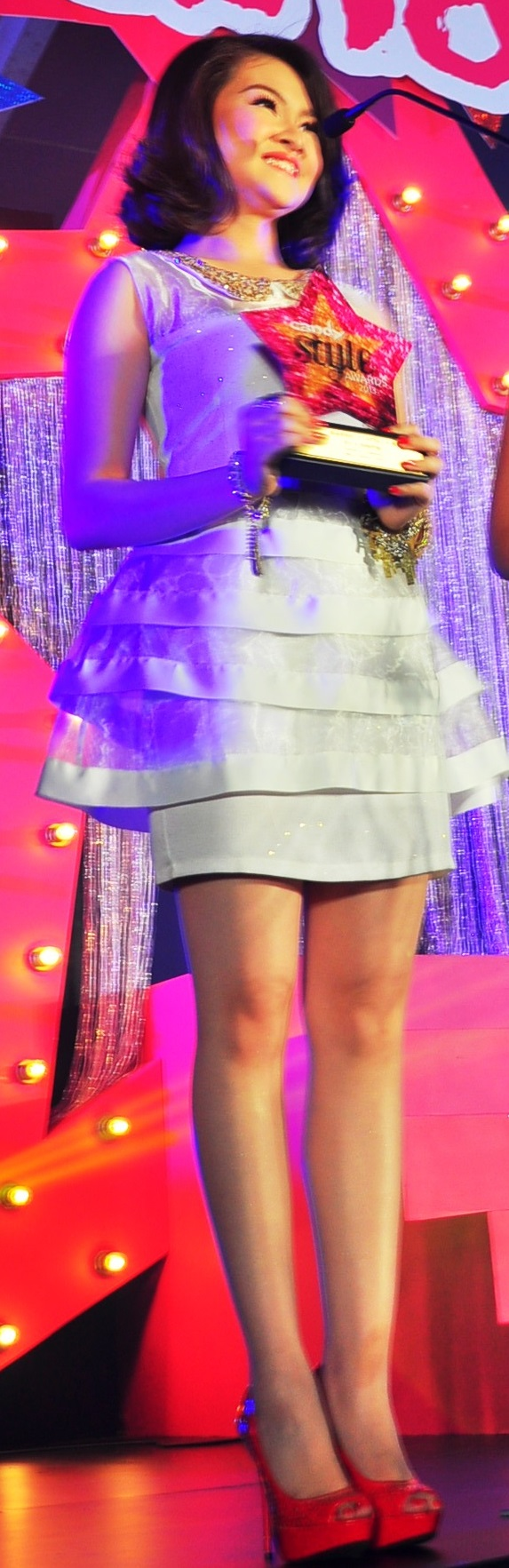
Barbie Forteza

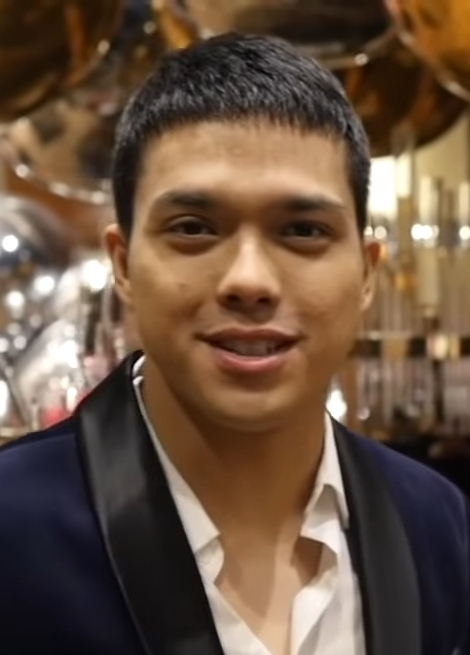
Elmo Magalona

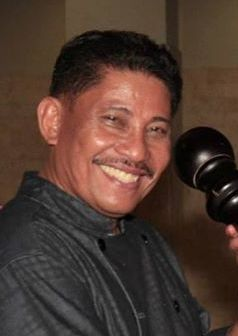
Boy Logro

Lead cast

- Marian Rivera as Megan "Meg" Reyes

Supporting cast

- Barbie Forteza as Adele Reyes
- Sheena Halili as Lily Montecarlo
- Nova Villa as Anita Domina Berciles / Domina delos Santos
- Roderick Paulate as JB Mercado
- Elmo Magalona as Dino Mercado
- Boy Logro as Boy Reyes
- Mikey Bustos as Dexter Matibag

Recurring cast

- AJ Dee as Areil
- Alessandra De Rossi as London
- Kevin Santos as Inoy
- Betong Sumaya as Justin B.
- Ryzza Mae Dizon as Illuminada
- Glaiza de Castro as Kimberly
- Jean Garcia as Eleanor
- Mike Tan as Marco

== Ratings ==
According to AGB Nielsen Philippines' Mega Manila household television ratings, the pilot episode of Tweets for My Sweet earned a 16.6% rating. The final episode scored a 14.6% rating.

== Accolades ==
Accolades received by Tweets for My Sweet
| Year | Award | Category | Recipient | Result | Ref. |
|---|---|---|---|---|---|
| 2012 | 26th PMPC Star Awards for Television | Best Comedy Actor | Roderick Paulate | Nominated | |
| 2012 | 26th PMPC Star Awards for Television | Best Comedy Actress | Marian Rivera Nova Villa | Nominated | |
| 2012 | 26th PMPC Star Awards for Television | Best Comedy/Gag Show | Tweets for My Sweet | Nominated | |
| 2013 | 10th Golden Screen TV Awards | Outstanding Comedy Program | Tweets for My Sweet | Nominated | |
| 2013 | 10th Golden Screen TV Awards | Outstanding Performance by an Actress in a Gag or Comedy Program | Marian Rivera | Nominated | |
| 2013 | 10th Golden Screen TV Awards | Outstanding Performance by a Supporting Actor in a Gag or Comedy Program | Roderick Paulate | Nominated | |
| 2013 | 10th Golden Screen TV Awards | Outstanding Performance by a Supporting Actress in a Gag or Comedy Program | Nova Villa | Nominated | |
| 2013 | 10th Golden Screen TV Awards | Outstanding Performance by a Supporting Actress in a Gag or Comedy Program | Sheena Halili | Won | |
