= You to Me Are Everything (film) =

- Theatrical release poster
- Directed by: Mark A. Reyes V
- Written by: Aloy Adlawan
- Produced by: Jose Mari Abacan; Roselle Monteverde; Annette Gozon-Abrogar; Lily Y. Monteverde
- Starring: Dingdong Dantes; Marian Rivera
- Cinematography: Jay Linao
- Edited by: Vanessa Ubas de Leon
- Music by: Von de Guzman
- Production companies: Regal Entertainment; GMA Pictures
- Distributed by: Regal Entertainment; GMA Pictures
- Release date: May 5, 2010
- Running time: 120 minutes
- Country: Philippines
- Language: Filipino
- Box office: ₱102 million ($2,203,119)

You to Me Are Everything is a 2010 Filipino romantic comedy film directed by Mark A. Reyes and starring Dingdong Dantes and Marian Rivera. The screenplay was written by Aloy Adlawan. The film was released on May 5, 2010, in the Philippines. The movie was produced by GMA Pictures.

== Synopsis ==
Iska (Marian Rivera) is a simple, contented girl from the Cordillera mountains who suddenly inherits millions after the death of her real father. Raphael (Dingdong Dantes) is from a rich family who suddenly finds himself penniless after his father Frank is convicted of corruption in congress. The two meet when Iska ends up in the mansion where Raphael used to live. Brought together by circumstance, Iska hires Raphael to be her business manager, showing her how to live the privileged life, while Iska, in turn, teaches Raphael how to find happiness in the little things in life. As the two struggle to find comfort in their new lives, they fall in love. But love, sometimes, comes with a price. Will they be willing to leave the life they love for the love of their life?

== Cast ==
Main cast

- Marian Rivera as Francisca "Iska" Carantes
- Dingdong Dantes as Rafael Iñigo Benitez III

Supporting cast

- Isabel Oli as Megan
- Jaclyn Jose as Florencia Carantes
- Manilyn Reynes as Greta
- Bobby Andrews as Atty. Ronnie Domingo
- Roxanne Barcelo as Lily
- AJ Dee as Carding
- Andrea Torres as Therese Fernandez
- Bela Padilla as Monique Fernandez
- Carlo Gonzales as Baste
- Victor Aliwalas as Roy
- Fabio Ide as Miko
- Pinky Amador as Estella Fernandez
- Chinggoy Alonzo as Frank Benitez Jr.
- "Snowy" as Iska's pet
- Jai Reyes as Rado
- Piero Vergara as party goer
- Sef Cadayona as Sef
