= Philippine Arts, Film and Television Awards =

Filipino performance award

- Current: 1st Philippine Arts, Film and Television Awards
- Awarded for: "To reward excellence, recognize individual distinction and advance the creative by celebrating outstanding achievements in Philippines film, television, theater, modeling and performing arts"
- Country: Philippines
- First award: 2026

The Philippine Arts, Film and Television Awards (PAFTA), is an awards ceremony presented by Philippine Academy of Film and Television Inc. It is founded by Dr. Billy James Uy, (Chairman of the Board), Teresita Tolentino Pambuan, (President), Christina Aliada (Executive Vice President) and Charlomagne Vales Arceta (Vice President) held its first awards ceremony on February 21, 2026 at Centennial Hall of Manila Hotel, Manila, Philippines.

PAFTA is a SEC-registered arts and cultural institution honoring excellence and individual distinction through awards, workshops, and talent programs that elevate Filipino creativity locally and internationally.

== History ==
The Philippine Academy of Film and Television Arts has inaugurated its first award on February 21, 2026 at Manila Hotel's Centennial Hall by PAFTA Committee which is composed of Billy James Uy (Chairman of the Board), Teresita Tolentino Pambuan (President), Christina U. Aliada (Executive Vice President), Charlomagne Vales Arceta (Vice President), Jocelyn Reyala (Corporate Secretary), Jenalyn Aliada (Secretary), Rafy Gellang (Treasurer), Edward Ralph Santos (Auditor), Nico Lizardo and Karen Rose Sumandal (PRO).

== Scope ==
PAFTA aims to recognize figures in the Philippine entertainment industry in the fields of film, television, theater, modeling, and performing arts.

PAFTA also recognizes significant contributions to cultural leadership, public service, and philanthropy. It also honors individuals and institutions whose work "inspires communities" and "strengthens the nation".

== Categories ==
Films

- Best Film
- Best Director
- Best Actor
- Best Actress
- Best Supporting Actor
- Best Supporting Actress
- Best Child Actor
- Best Child Actress
- Breakthrough Performance
- Most Promising Star
- Philippines Box Office Star

Television

- Best Station
- Best Drama Series
  - Best Drama Actor
  - Best Drama Actress
- Best Drama Anthology
- Best Comedy Show
- Best Reality Show
- Best Variety Show
  - Best Male TV Host
  - Best Female TV Host
- Best Celebrity Talk Show
- Best Morning Show
- Best Noontime Show
- Best News Program
- Best Documentary

Theater

- Contemporary Theater Award
- Musical Theater Award
- National Cultural Impact and Educational Theater Award

== Award ceremony ==
Year	Ceremony	Host	Awards venue	Ref.
2026	1st Philippine Arts, Film and Television Awards	Ara Mina and Gelo Buencamino	Centennial Hall of Manila Hotel, Manila, Philippines	
