= List of awards and nominations received by Toni Gonzaga =

This is the list of awards, nominations, recognition, and achievements received by Filipino actress, singer, television host and endorser Toni Gonzaga. Popularly dubbed as the "Ultimate Multimedia Star" and "Romantic Comedy Queen", Gonzaga has received numerous awards and recognition in the entertainment industry (in television, film, music, and advertising) from local and international award-giving bodies.

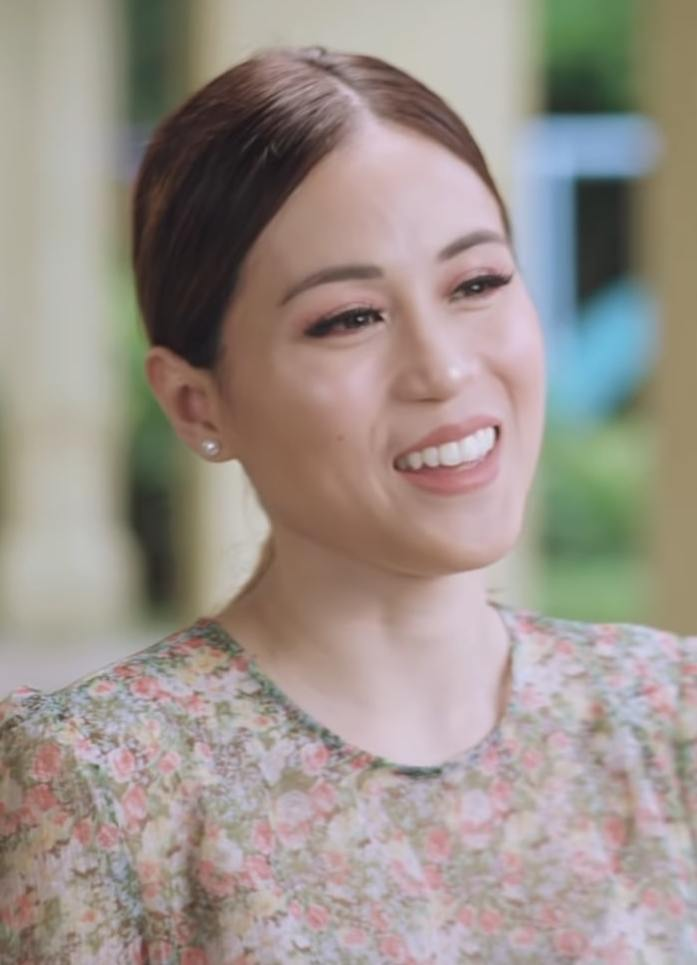
Gonzaga in 2019

Throughout her career, Gonzaga has won over 100 awards and recognitions. As an actress, she has been named as Box-Office Queen by the Guillermo Mendoza Memorial Scholarship Foundation Box-Office Entertainment Awards, as well as Best Actress from the FAMAS Awards for her performance in the box-office giant, Starting Over Again. She also won PinakaPASADOng Katuwang na Aktres (Best Supporting Actress) for her performance in blockbuster movie Four Sisters and a Wedding from the Gawad PASADO. As a television host, she has gained multiple wins from the PMPC Star Awards for TV as Best Female TV Host for various shows and programs. Also, she has been elevated to the Hall of Fame of the Aliw Awards in Best Female Emcee category. She was also cited as the Most Trusted Entertainment/Variety Show Presenter by the Reader's Digest Asia. As a singer, she won as the Best Female Concert Performer in the Guillermo Mendoza Memorial Scholarship Foundation Box-Office Entertainment Awards. PMPC Star Awards for Music has given her the Album of the Year and Female Pop Artist of the Year awards. Moreover, she has received multiple Gold and a Platinum certifications for her albums from the PARI. Gonzaga was honored on Eastwood City Walk of Fame in 2013 and was inducted to the Hall of Fame in Most Admired Female TV Personality category of Anak TV Seal Awards.

== Awards and nominations ==
=== Aliw Awards ===
Year	Nominee / work	Award	Result
2006	Herself	Best Female Emcee	Nominated
2007	Herself	Best Female Emcee	Won
2008	Catch Me Concert	Best Major Concert (Female)	Nominated
2010	Herself	Best Female Emcee	Nominated
2011	Toni @ 10: The Anniversary Concert	Best Major Concert (Female)	Nominated
2013	Herself	Best Female Emcee	Won
2014	Herself	Best Female Emcee	Won
2015	Herself	Hall of Fame: Best Female Emcee	Inducted
2015	Celestine Concert	Best Major Concert (Female)	Nominated

=== Anak TV Seal Awards ===
Year	Nominee / work	Award	Result
2007	Herself	Most Admired Female TV Personality	Won
2008	Herself	Most Admired Female TV Personality	Won
2009	Herself	Most Admired Female TV Personality	Won
2010	Herself	Most Admired Female TV Personality	Won
2011	Herself	Most Admired Female TV Personality	Won
2012	Herself	Most Admired Female TV Personality	Won
2014	Herself	Most Admired Female TV Personality	Won
2015	Herself	Hall of Fame: Most Admired Female TV Personality	Inducted

=== Awit Awards ===
Year	Nominee / work	Award	Result
2006	Herself	Best New Female Recording Artist	Nominated
2007	We Belong (from You Complete Me album)	Best Ballad Recording	Nominated
2008	Catch Me, I'm Falling (from Falling in Love album)	Best Ballad Recording	Nominated
2010	Ganyan ang Pasko	Best Christmas Recording	Won
2011	You Make Me Feel (from All Me album)	Best R&B Lyricist and Artist	Nominated
2011	All Me (from All Me album)	Best Dance Recording	Nominated
2011	Ngayong Pasko, Magniningning ang Pilipino (with Gary Valenciano ft. UST Choir)	Best Christmas Recording	Nominated
2014	Kahit Na	Best Novelty Recording	Nominated
2015	This Love is Like (from Celestine album)	Best Dance Recording	Nominated
2015	This Love is Like (from Celestine album)	Best Inspirational/Religious Recording	Nominated

=== FAMAS Awards ===
Year	Nominee / work	Award	Result
2014	for Four Sisters and a Wedding	Best Actress	Nominated
2015	for Starting Over Again	Best Actress	Won
2015	Herself	Face of the Night	Won
2016	for You're My Boss	Best Actress	Nominated

=== GMMSF Box-Office Entertainment Awards ===
Year	Nominee / work	Award	Result
2006	Herself	Most Promising Female Star	Won
2007	for You are the One	Princess of Philippine Movies	Won
2010	Herself	Cathy Valencia Skin of the Night	Won
2011	for My Amnesia Girl	Princess of Philippine Movies	Won
2012	Herself for Toni @ 10: The Anniversary Concert	Female Concert Performer of the Year	Won
2013	for This Guy's in Love with U Mare!	Princess of Philippine Movies	Won
2014	Herself for Kahit Na	Most Popular Novelty Singer	Won
2015	for Starting Over Again	Box Office Queen	Won
2017	Herself	Female TV Host of the Year	Won
2019	Herself	Female TV Host of the Year	Won
2020	Herself	Female TV Host of the Year	Won

=== Golden Screen Awards ===
Year	Nominee / work	Award	Result
2005	Herself for Entertainment Konek	Outstanding Showbiz-Oriented Program Host	Nominated
2007	for You Are the One	Best Performance by an Actress in a Leading Role (Musical or Comedy)	Nominated
2008	for You Got Me!	Best Performance by an Actress in a Leading Role (Musical or Comedy)	Nominated
2009	for My Only Ü	Best Performance by an Actress in a Leading Role (Musical or Comedy)	Nominated
2011	for My Amnesia Girl	Best Performance by an Actress in a Leading Role (Musical or Comedy)	Nominated
2013	Herself	Outstanding Female Showbiz Talk Program Host	Nominated
2014	Herself for The Buzz	Outstanding Female Showbiz Talk Program Host	Nominated
2014	Herself for ASAP 18	Outstanding Female Host in a Musical Program	Nominated

=== PMPC Star Awards for Movies ===
Year	Nominee / work	Award	Result
2010	Herself	Darling of the Press	Nominated
2011	Herself	Female Star of the Night	Won
2014	Herself	Female Star of the Night	Won
2015	for Starting Over Again	Movie Actress of the Year	Nominated

=== PMPC Star Awards for Music ===
Year	Nominee / work	Award	Result
2009	Herself	Nesvita Beautiful Inside and Out	Won
2011	Herself	Female Pop Artist of the Year	Won
2011	Herself	Female Face of the Night	Won
2011	All Me	Album of the Year	Nominated
2011	Catch Me, I'm Falling	Song of the Year	Nominated
2011	Herself	Female Recording Artist of the Year	Nominated
2012	Herself for Toni @ 10: The Anniversary Concert	Female Concert Performer of the Year	Nominated
2012	Greatest Hits	Compilation Album of the Year	Nominated
2015	Celestine	Album of the Year	Won
2015	Herself	Female Recording Artist of the Year	Nominated
2015	Celestine	Pop Album of the Year	Nominated
2015	Herself	Female Pop Artist of the Year	Nominated
2015	Celestine	Concert of the Year	Nominated
2015	Herself for Celestine Concert	Female Concert Performer of the Year	Nominated
2016	Herself	Female Recording Artist of the Year	Nominated
2016	Herself	Female Pop Artist of the Year	Nominated

=== PMPC Star Awards for Television ===
Year	Nominee / work	Award	Result
2004	for Lagot Ka, Isusumbong Kita	Best Comedy Actress	Nominated
2005	for Lagot Ka, Isusumbong Kita	Best Comedy Actress	Nominated
2005	Herself	Best Female TV Host	Nominated
2005	Herself for Entertainment Konek	Best Female Showbiz-Oriented Talk Show Host	Nominated
2006	Herself	Best Female TV Host	Won
2006	for Wazzup Wazzup	Best Comedy Actress	Nominated
2007	for Wazzup Wazzup	Best Comedy Actress	Nominated
2007	Herself	Best Female TV Host	Nominated
2008	Herself for Entertainment Live	Best Female Showbiz-Oriented Talk Show Host	Nominated
2008	Herself	Best Female TV Host	Nominated
2009	Herself for Entertainment Live	Best Female Showbiz-Oriented Talk Show Host	Won
2009	Herself	Best Female TV Host	Nominated
2009	Herself for Pinoy Dream Academy	Best Reality Show Host	Nominated
2010	Herself	Best Female TV Host	Won
2010	Herself for Pinoy Big Brother: Double Up	Best Reality Show Host	Won
2010	Herself for Entertainment Live	Best Female Showbiz-Oriented Talk Show Host	Nominated
2011	Herself	Best Female TV Host	Won
2011	Herself	Star of the Night	Won
2011	Herself for The Buzz	Best Female Showbiz-Oriented Talk Show Host	Nominated
2012	Herself	Best Female TV Host	Won
2012	Herself for The Buzz	Best Female Showbiz-Oriented Talk Show Host	Nominated
2012	Herself for Pinoy Big Brother: Unlimited	Best Reality/Game Show Host	Nominated
2013	Herself for The Voice of the Philippines	Best Talent Search Program Host	Won
2013	Herself	Best Female TV Host	Nominated
2013	Herself for The Buzz	Best Female Showbiz-Oriented Talk Show Host	Nominated
2014	for Home Sweetie Home	Best Comedy Actress	Nominated
2014	Herself	Best Female TV Host	Won
2014	Herself for Pinoy Big Brother: All In	Best Reality Show Host	Won
2014	Herself for The Voice of the Philippines	Best Talent Show Program Host	Nominated
2014	Herself for The Buzz	Best Female Showbiz-Oriented Talk Show Host	Won
2015	for Home Sweetie Home	Best Comedy Actress	Nominated
2015	Herself for The Buzz	Best Female Showbiz-Oriented Talk Show Host	Won
2015	Herself for Pinoy Big Brother: 737	Best Reality Show Host	Won
2015	Herself	Best Female TV Host	Nominated
2016	for Home Sweetie Home	Best Comedy Actress	Nominated
2016	Herself	Best Female TV Host	Nominated
2017	for Home Sweetie Home	Best Comedy Actress	Nominated
2017	Herself	Best Female TV Host	Nominated
2017	Herself for The Voice Teens	Best Talent Search Program Host	Won
2018	for Home Sweetie Home	Best Comedy Actress	Nominated
2018	Herself	Best Female TV Host	Nominated
2019	for Home Sweetie Home	Best Comedy Actress	Nominated
2019	Herself	Best Female TV Host	Nominated
2021	for Home Sweetie Home	Best Comedy Actress	Nominated

== Others ==
=== Alta Media Icon Awards ===
Year	Nominee / work	Award	Result
2015	for Home Sweetie Home	Best Actress for TV (Comedy Role)	Won
2015	Herself for Pinoy Big Brother	Best Reality Show Host	Won
2019	for Home Sweetie Home	Best Comedy Actress for Television	Won

=== ASAP 24K Gold Awards ===
Year	Nominee / work	Award	Result
2007	Falling in Love album	Female Artist Awardee	Won
2009	Love is... Toni Gonzaga album	Female Artist Awardee	Won
2011	All Me album	Female Artist Awardee	Won

=== ASAP Platinum Circle Awards ===
Year	Nominee / work	Award	Result
2007	Falling in Love album	Female Artist Awardee	Won
2007	Hotsilog album	Compilation Album Awardee	Won
2007	Nagmamahal Kapamilya album	Compilation Album Awardee	Won

=== ASAP Pop Viewer's Choice Awards ===
Year	Nominee / work	Award	Result
2006	as Sally Malasmas in You are the One (with Sam Milby as Will Derby)	Pop Screen Kiss	Won
2006	You are the One	Pop Movie Theme Song	Won
2007	You Got Me!	Pop Movie	Won
2007	as Amor Santander in You are the One (with Sam Milby as Kevin Robles)	Pop Screen Kiss	Won

=== Asia Pacific Luminare Awards ===
Year	Nominee / work	Award	Result
2022	Herself	Most Remarkable Talk Show Host of the Year	Won

=== COMGUILD Media Awards ===
Year	Nominee / work	Award	Result
2015	Herself	Most Admired Female Endorser	Won

=== CommExcel Students' Choice Awards ===
Year	Nominee / work	Award	Result
2015	Herself	Outstanding Female TV Personality	Won

=== Eastwood City Walk of Fame ===
Year	Nominee / work	Award	Result
2013	Herself	contribution in TV, Music, Film, and Advertising	Inducted

=== EdukCircle Awards ===
Year	Nominee / work	Award	Result
2014	Herself	Most Influential Film Actress of the Year	Won
2015	Herself	Most Influential Celebrity Endorser of the Year	Won
2015	Herself	Most Influential Concert Performer of the Year	Won
2015	Herself	Best Talent Show Host	Won
2016	Herself	Best Female Variety Show Host	Won
2017	Herself	Best Female Talent Show Host	Won
2018	Herself	Best Female Talent Show Host	Won
2019	Herself	Best Female Reality Show Host	Won

=== FHM Magazine ===
Year	Nominee / work	Award	Result
2004	Herself	100 Sexiest Women in the World	Included:#84
2005	Herself	100 Sexiest Women in the World	Included:#16
2006	Herself	100 Sexiest Women in the World	Included:#27
2007	Herself	100 Sexiest Women in the World	Included:#33
2008	Herself	100 Sexiest Women in the World	Included:#35
2009	Herself	100 Sexiest Women in the World	Included:#46
2010	Herself	100 Sexiest Women in the World	Included:#40
2011	Herself	100 Sexiest Women in the World	Included:#29
2012	Herself	100 Sexiest Women in the World	Included:#29
2013	Herself	100 Sexiest Women in the World	Included:#53

=== FMTM Awards for Movies ===
Year	Nominee / work	Award	Result
2010	for My Amnesia Girl	Blockbuster Queen	Won
2010	for My Amnesia Girl	Blockbuster Movie Artist	Won

=== Gawad Lasallianeta ===
Year	Nominee / work	Award	Result
2022	for Toni Talks	Most Outstanding Talk Show (TV/Online)	Won

=== Gawad PASADO ===
Year	Nominee / work	Award	Result
2014	for Four Sisters and a Wedding	PinakaPASADOng Katuwang na Aktres	Won

=== Global Trends Business Leaders Awards ===
Year	Nominee / work	Award	Result
2022	Herself	Bankable Multifaceted Female TV Host of the Year	Won

=== Golden Laurel: Lycean Choice Media Awards ===
Year	Nominee / work	Award	Result
2016	Herself	Best Reality Show Host	Won

=== Himig Handog P-Pop Love Songs ===
Year	Nominee / work	Award	Result
2013	Interpreter of Kahit Na, composed by Julius James de Belen	Best Song	Won: 5th place

=== MOR Pinoy Music Awards ===
Year	Nominee / work	Award	Result
2014	Kahit Na	Dance Hit of the Year	Won

=== Municipality of Taytay, Rizal ===
Year	Nominee / work	Award	Result
2016	Herself	Most Outstanding Women of Taytay	Included

=== Myx Music Awards ===
Year	Nominee / work	Award	Result
2007	Herself	Favorite Female Artist	Nominated
2007	Herself	Favorite New Artist	Nominated
2008	Catch Me, I'm Falling	Favorite Ringtone	Won
2008	Herself	Favorite Female Artist	Nominated
2008	Catch Me, I'm Falling	Favorite Mellow Video	Nominated
2015	Herself	Favorite MYX Celebrity VJ	Won
2015	This Love is Like	Favorite Song	Nominated
2015	Herself	Favorite Female Artist	Nominated

=== People Asia Magazine ===
Year	Nominee / work	Award	Result
2007	Herself	Women of Style and Substance	Included
2014	Herself	Women of Style and Substance	Included

=== PEP List Awards ===
Year	Nominee / work	Award	Result
2014	Herself	Fab Award (Female)	Nominated
2016	Herself	Movie Star of the Year (Female)	Nominated
2016	Herself and Paul Soriano	Favorite Wedding of the Year	Nominated

=== Phoenix Excellence Award for Entertainment ===
Year	Nominee / work	Award	Result
2021	Herself	Best Female Host	Won
2021	Herself	Phenomenal Vlogger of the Year	Won

=== Platinum Stallion Media Awards ===
Year	Nominee / work	Award	Result
2018	for Last Night	Best Film Actress	Won
2021	Herself	Inspiring Social Media Influencer	Won

=== PUSH Awards ===
Year	Nominee / work	Award	Result
2015	Herself	Favorite Female Celebrity	Nominated
2015	Herself	Most Popular Female Celebrity	Nominated
2017	Herself	Celebrity Host of the Year	Nominated

=== RAWR Awards (LionhearTV) ===
Year	Nominee / work	Award	Result
2015	Herself	Host/Presenter of the Year	Won
2020	Herself	Favorite TV Host	Won
2021	Herself	Vlogger of the Year (Long)	Won

=== Reader's Digest Asia ===
Year	Nominee / work	Award	Result
2016	Herself	Most Trusted Entertainment/Variety Show Presenter	Won

=== SM Cinema Awards ===
Year	Nominee / work	Award	Result
2011	for My Amnesia Girl	Box Office Queen	Won

=== Star Studio Celebrity Style Awards ===
Year	Nominee / work	Award	Result
2010	Herself	Most Stylish Comedienne	Won
2010	Herself	Most Stylish Live Performer (Female)	Nominated

=== Tatler Asia ===
Year	Nominee / work	Award	Result
2021	Herself	Asia's Most Influential	Included

=== UmalohokJUAN Media Awards ===
Year	Nominee / work	Award	Result
2016	Herself	Best Female TV Host	Won
2018	Herself	Best Female TV Host	Won

=== USTv Awards ===
Year	Nominee / work	Award	Result
2004	Herself	Students' Choice of Best Female Program Host	Nominated
2014	Herself for The Voice of the Philippines	Students' Choice of Reality/Game Show Host	Won
2014	Herself for The Buzz	Students' Choice of Talk Show Host	Won
2014	Herself for ASAP	Students' Choice of Variety Show Host	Nominated
2015	Herself for The Buzz	Students' Choice of Talk Show Host	Won
2015	Herself for The Voice of the Philippines (season 2)	Students' Choice of Reality/Game Show Host	Won
2015	Herself for ASAP	Students' Choice of Variety Show Host	Won

=== Viral Awards ===
Year	Nominee / work	Award	Result
2022	Herself	Empowered Icon Influencer of the Year	Won

=== Walk on Water (W.O.W.) Awards: The ABS-CBN Special Recognition ===
Year	Nominee / work	Award	Result
2007	for Pinoy Big Brother	W.O.W. Award Team Category	Won

=== Yahoo OMG! Awards ===
Year	Nominee / work	Award	Result
2011	Herself	Favorite Female TV Host	Won
2012	Herself	Favorite Female TV Host	Nominated
2013	Herself	Favorite Female TV Host	Won
2014	Herself	Favorite Female TV Host	Nominated
2014	for Starting Over Again	Actress of the Year	Nominated

=== Yes! Magazine ===
Year	Nominee / work	Award	Result
2007	Herself	100 Most Beautiful Stars	Included
2008	Herself	Top 20 Celebrity Endorsers	Included
2009	Herself with Alex Gonzaga	100 Prettiest - Siblings	Included
2009	Herself	50 Most Powerful Celebrities	Included
2010	Herself	100 Most Beautiful Stars (under The Heroines Category)	Included
2011	Herself	100 Most Beautiful Stars (under Hosts Category)	Included
2013	Herself	100 Most Beautiful Stars (under Winning Hosts Category)	Included
2014	Herself	100 Most Beautiful Stars (under Blockbuster Queens Category)	Included
2015	Herself	100 Most Beautiful Stars (under Phenomenal Category)	Included
2016	Herself	100 Most Beautiful Stars (under A-Listers Category)	Included
2017	Herself	100 Most Beautiful Stars (under Prized Stars Category)	Included
