= Toni Gonzaga filmography =

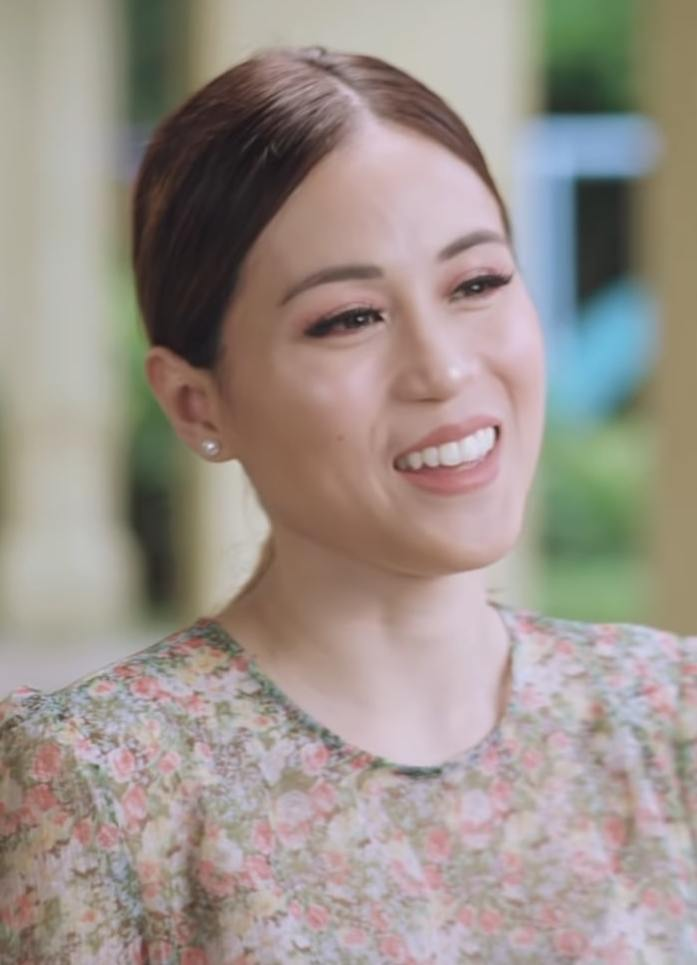
Gonzaga in 2019

Toni Gonzaga is a Filipino actress, singer, and television presenter who has appeared in films and television series. She began her career in 1997 by participating in the reality show Metropop Star Search. She rose to prominence by appearing in a television advertisement for the soft drink Sprite in 2001. She subsequently began her career on television by appearing in the noontime variety show Eat Bulaga! (2002–2005). She also starred in the drama series Habang Kapiling Ka (2002–2003) and made her film debut in Pakners (2003).

After signing with ABS-CBN in 2005, Gonzaga hosted the reality show Pinoy Big Brother and co-starred in a leading role alongside Vhong Navarro in the comedy horror film D' Anothers (2005). She then began collaborating with actor Sam Milby by playing a government employee in the romantic comedy You Are the One (2006), for which she won a Box Office Entertainment Award, followed by a portrayal of a police officer in You Got Me! (2007). Following a string of leading roles in commercially successful blockbusters My Amnesia Girl (2010) and This Guy's in Love with U Mare! (2012), she was nominated for a FAMAS Award for her performance in Four Sisters and a Wedding. The following year, she starred in the romantic comedy Starting Over Again, which earned her a FAMAS Award for Best Actress. She was also named the Box Office Queen at the 2015 Box Office Entertainment Awards. Gonzaga later expanded her career into film production with Mary, Marry Me (2018).

On television, Gonzaga starred in the drama series Maging Sino Ka Man: Ang Pagbabalik (2007–2008), the sequel to Maging Sino Ka Man (2006). Apart from Pinoy Big Brother, she also hosted the reality shows The Voice of the Philippines (2013), The Voice Teens (2017), and The Voice Kids (2019). She also produced and hosted her talk show Toni (2022–2023).

== Film ==
| Year | Title | Role | Notes | Ref |
|---|---|---|---|---|
| 2003 | Pakners | Angela Dimayuga | | |
| 2005 | D' Anothers | Maan Tuken | P110 million | |
| 2006 | You Are the One | Purita "Sally" Malasmas | P115 million 2007 GMMSF Princess of Philippine Movies | |
| 2007 | You Got Me! | Insp. Amor "Moe" Santander | P115 million | |
| 2008 | My Big Love | Aira Capistrano | P73 million | |
| 2008 | My Only U | Winona Benigno Aunor | P79 million | |
| 2009 | Ang Tanging Pamilya: A Marry Go Round | Carlotta "Charlie" Sicat | P79 million | |
| 2009 | A Journey Home | Gayle Santos | Gideon Flame Film Festival's Best Film | |
| 2010 | My Amnesia Girl | Irene Gallego | P164 million SM Cinema's Box Office Queen; 2011 Princess of Philippine Movies | |
| 2011 | Wedding Tayo, Wedding Hindi | Maribelle "Belay" Bautista | P65.9 million | |
| 2012 | This Guy's in Love with U Mare! | Gemma | P260 million 2013 GMMSF Princess of Philippine Movies | |
| 2013 | Four Sisters and a Wedding | Theodora Grace "Teddie" Salazar | P145 million Gawad Pasado's Pinakapasadong Katuwang na Aktress | |
| 2013 | Transit | Joshua's mother | Cameo | |
| 2014 | Starting Over Again | Genina "Ginny" Gonzales | P579 million Highest Grossing Non-MMFF Movie of 2014; 2015 GMMSF Box-Office Queen; 2015 FAMAS Best Actress | |
| 2015 | You're My Boss | Georgina Lorenzana | P260 million | |
| 2017 | Last Night | Carmina Salvador/Jennifer Reyes | P95 million 2018 Platinum Stallion Media Awards Best Film Actress | |
| 2018 | Mary, Marry Me | Mary Jane "MJ" Lagman | P90 million 44th Metro Manila Film Festival Official Entry | |
| 2020 | Four Sisters Before the Wedding | Theodora Grace "Teddie" Salazar-Teodoro | Guest role | |
| 2021 | The Exorsis | Gina Raymundo Morales | 47th Metro Manila Film Festival Official Entry | |
| 2022 | My Teacher | Emma | 48th Metro Manila Film Festival Official Entry | |
| 2024 | My Sassy Girl | Sheena | Adaptation of South Korean movie My Sassy Girl. | |

== Television ==
| Year | Title | Role | Notes | Ref |
|---|---|---|---|---|
| 1998–2001 | Bubble Gang | Herself | Recurring | |
| 1999 | Maynila | Various Roles | | |
| 1999 | Dear Mikee | Various Roles | | |
| 2000 | Campus Romance | Various Roles | | |
| 2000 | GMA Telecine Specials | Various Roles | | |
| 2000 | May Himala | Various Roles | | |
| 2001 | Ikaw Lang ang Mamahalin | Maya | Guest role | |
| 2002 | Habang Kapiling Ka | Emilie Capistrano-Bravo | Supporting role | |
| 2002–2005 | Eat Bulaga! | Host | | |
| 2002–2005 | SOP | Host/performer | | |
| 2003–2004 | May Puso Ang Batas | | | |
| 2003–2005 | Lagot Ka, Isusumbong Kita | Toni | | |
| 2004 | Love to Love | Tammy | Season 3 Story 2: "Duet For Love" | |
| 2004 | Bahay Mo Ba 'To? | Florence | Guest role | |
| 2004 | S-Files | Co-host | | |
| 2004 | Bitoy's Funniest Videos | Co-host | | |
| 2004–2007 | Wazzup Wazzup | Main anchor | | |
| 2005–2022 | ASAP | Host/Performer | Main host It Girls (Girl group, with Heart, Anne, Iya, Nikki, Bea, Maja, Shaina, and Karylle); D-Lite (Girl group, with Karylle and Nikki); T-Zone (Solo segment) | |
| 2005–2022 | Pinoy Big Brother | Main host | Season 1 Celebrity Edition 1 Teen Edition 1 (The Big Night guest host); Season 2 Celebrity Edition 2 Teen Edition Plus; Double Up; Teen Clash 2010; Unlimited; Teen Edition 4 All In; 737; Lucky 7 Otso; Connect; Kumunity 10 | |
| 2005 | Entertainment Konek | Co-host | | |
| 2005 | MRS | Main host | | |
| 2005 | My Juan and Only | Beth | | |
| 2005–2006 | Bora | Valentina | | |
| 2006 | Gudtaym | Herself | | |
| 2006 | Crazy for You | Janice | Lead role | |
| 2006 | Komiks | Big Sister (voice); Tina; Thelma | S101 "Inday Bote"; S109 "Paa ni Isabella"; Da Adventures of Pedro Penduko | |
| 2006–2008 | Pinoy Dream Academy | Main host | | |
| 2006–2007; 2010 | Your Song | Andie; Annie Batungbakal; Leslie; Carmela; Gladys; Sarah Mercado / Camille dela Rosa / Carmela Legaspi | S1E03 "I’ve Fallen in Love"; S3E12 "Annie Batungbakal"; S4E11 "Wishing Lampara"; S5E10 "Kasalanan Ko Ba?"; S7E02 "What are the Chances"; S11E01-05 "My Last Romance" | |
| 2007 | Lastikman | Gemma dela Rosa | Special guest star | |
| 2007 | Love Spell | Barbie | S3E03 "Barbi-Cute" | |
| 2007–2008 | Maging Sino Ka Man: Ang Pagbabalik | Monaliza "Onay" Dimaano / Anna Joy Romualdez | Main role (78 episodes) | |
| 2007–2010 | Entertainment Live | Main host | | |
| 2008 | Pilipinas, Game KNB? | Guest host | | |
| 2009, 2011 & 2017 | Maalaala Mo Kaya | Julie; Solly; Josephine | S17E07 "Pendant"; S19E16 "Tropeo"; S25E50 "Sumbrero" | |
| 2009 | Precious Hearts Romances Presents: Ang Lalaking Nagmahal Sa Akin | Flor Magpantay | Lead role (35 episodes) | |
| 2009, 2010 | May Bukas Pa | Alexandra "Alex" Wang | Chapter 18: "Runaway"; Guest role (9 episodes) | |
| 2010 | Ituwid Natin | Main news anchor | | |
| 2010 | SNN | Guest anchor | | |
| 2010 | Kokey @ Ako | Jackie / Princess | Main role (55 episodes) | |
| 2010–2015 | The Buzz | Host | | |
| 2010 & 2011 | Wansapanataym | Karina; Mitch; Hannah; Amanda/Fairy; Belle | S1E16 "Karina Kariton" (Christmas Special); S3E77 "Witchy Mitch"; S3E78 "Hannah Panahon"; S3E79 "Amanda's Da Man"; S3E80 "IncrediBelle" | |
| 2011–2012 | Happy Yipee Yehey! | Main host | | |
| 2012 | Toda Max | Maxene | Guest role (May 5, 2012) | |
| 2013 | Kwentong Kusina, Kwentong Buhay | Host | Cooking show | |
| 2013–2015 | The Voice of the Philippines | Main host | | |
| 2014–2020 | Home Sweetie Home | Julie Matahimik-Valentino | Lead role | |
| 2014 | Aquino & Abunda Tonight | Guest host (with Alex Gonzaga) | (August 25, 2014, September 2, 2014) | |
| 2015 | Binibining Pilipinas 2015 | Host | | |
| 2016 | I Love OPM | Judge | | |
| 2016 | Written in Our Stars | Aira | Cancelled because of her pregnancy | |
| 2017 | The Voice Teens | Main host | | |
| 2017 | TV Patrol | Guest host | "Star Patrol" segment (August 25, 2017) | |
| 2018 | Pilipinas Got Talent | Host | | |
| 2019 | The Voice Kids | Main host | | |
| 2020–2021 | I Feel U | Main host | Online show | |
| 2021 | Lunch Out Loud | Herself | Noontime show; guest appearance (December 25, 2021) | |
| 2021–present | Toni Talks | Main host | Online YouTube Talk Show | |
| 2022 | Eat Bulaga! | Guest host | Noontime show; guest appearance (December 24, 2022) | |
| 2022–2023 | Toni | Main host | Official talk show of All TV, created by TGS (Toni Gonzaga Studios), produced and hosted by herself. | |
| 2024 | Eat Bulaga! | Performer | Noontime show; guest appearance (January 27, 2024) | |
| 2024 | Gud Morning Kapatid | Performer | Morning show of TV5; guest appearance (January 30, 2024) | |
| 2025 | Eat Bulaga! | Performer | Noontime show; guest appearance (January 10, 2025) | |
