= Greatest Hits (Toni Gonzaga album) =

Greatest hits

Compilation album by Toni Gonzaga
- Released: September 30, 2011
- Recorded: 2006–2010
- Genre: Pop, adult contemporary, OPM
- Length: CD, 0:53:19
- Language: English, Tagalog
- Label: Star Recording, Inc., The Orchard
- Producer: Malou N. Santos (executive); Annabelle R. Borja (executive); Roque 'rox' B. Santos (over-all album project head)

Toni Gonzaga chronology
All Me (2010)	Greatest hits (2011)	Celestine (2014)

Greatest Hits is the first compilation album (18th over-all) of Filipino TV host, actress-singer Toni Gonzaga and her fifteenth on Star Records (sixth as a solo artist), released on September 30, 2011 in the Philippines in CD format and digital download. It has since sold more than 10,000 copies in the country.

== Background ==
Greatest Hits contains 14 tracks from her five previous albums: three from Toni: You Complete Me, four from Falling in Love, one from Love Is..., two from Love Duets, and four from All Me. It is Toni's first solo compilation album under Star Records and was released on September 30, 2011, during her Toni @ 10: The Anniversary Concert held at Smart Araneta Coliseum.

== Track listing ==
Disc 1

No.	Title	Writer(s)	Arranger(s)	Length
1.	"We Belong"	Christian Martinez	Albert Tamayo	03:47
2.	"Kung Kaya Ko"	Toni Gonzaga	Albert Tamayo	04:04
3.	"Catch Me I'm Falling"	Christian Martinez	Dominic Benedicto	04:37
4.	"Kasalanan Ko Ba?"	Jimmy Antiporda	Albert Tamayo	04:09
5.	"Crazy For You"	John Bettis/Jon Lind	Jack Rufo	03:53
6.	"I've Fallin' For You"	Jay-Donna/Montelibano-McLoed	Dominic Benedicto	04:09
7.	"Perfect World"	Christian Martinez	Albert Tamayo	03:09
8.	"One Hello"	M. Hamlisch/C. Bayer Sager	Dominic Benedicto	03:19
9.	"Can't Help Myself"	Jimmy Antiporda	Jimmy Antiporda	03:25
10.	"I Love You So"	Jonathan Manalo	Arnold Jallores	03:53
11.	"If Ever You're In My Arms Again feat. Sam Milby"	M. Masser/T. Snow/C. Weil	Arnold Jallores	04:13
12.	"Suddenly feat. Sam Milby"	John Farrar	Jimmy Antiporda	03:33
13.	"Only With You - Full Edit"	Rox B. Santos	Arnold Jallores	03:05
14.	"All Me"	Jonathan Manalo	Brian Chua/Arnold Buena	03:55

- track 4 - "Kasalanan Ko Ba?" is a remake of an original song by the Neocolours.
- track 5 - "Crazy For you" a remake of an original song by Madonna and was used as the theme song of ABS-CBN's Crazy For You.
- track 6 - "I've Fallen For You" is a remake of an original song by Jamie Rivera and was featured in the Star Cinema film, I've Fallen for You starring Gerald Anderson and Kim Chiu.
- track 7 - "Perfect World" is the carrier track of Level Up Games' online game Perfect World.
- track 8 - "One Hello" is a remake of an original song by Randy Crawford
- track 10 - "I Love You So" was used to promote the Chinese series, I Love You So, Autumn's Concerto starring Vaness Wu and Ady An, when shown in the Philippines.
- track 11 - "If Ever You're In My Arms Again" is a remake of an original song by Peabo Bryson and was used as the theme song of her leading role film, My Big Love.

== Personnel ==
- Malou N. Santos – executive producer
- Annabelle R. Borja – executive producer
- Roque 'rox' B. Santos – all-over project producer
- Jonathan Manalo – audio content head
- Roxy Liquigan – star adprom head
- Jason Alvares – audio marketing strategist and digital marketing head
- Darwin Chiang – promo specialist
- Marivic Benedicto – star songs, inc. and new media head
- Beth Faustino – music publishing manager
- Eaizen Almazan – new media technical assistant
- Jan Michael Ibanez – project coordinator
- Andrew Castillo – creative head
- Justin Mark Marcos – album design and layout
- Doc Marlon Pecto – photographer
- AJ Alberto – stylist
- Macy Dionido – hair stylist
- Krist Bansuelo – make up artist
