= Love Is... (Toni Gonzaga album) =

Studio album by Toni Gonzaga
- Released: April 27, 2008
- Recorded: November 2007 – March 2008
- Genre: Pop; adult contemporary; OPM
- Length: 48:05
- Language: English
- Label: Star Recording, Inc.
- Producer: Malou N. Santos (executive); Annabelle Regaldo-Borja(executive); Christian Martinez (over all)

Toni Gonzaga chronology
Falling in Love (2007)	Love Is... (2008)	Love Duets (with Sam Milby) (2009)

Singles from Love Is...
- 1. "One Hello" Released: May 2008; 2. "Incapable" Released: July 2008; 3. "Take Me, I'll Follow" Released: September 2008

Love Is... is the fourth studio album of Filipino TV host, actress-singer Toni Gonzaga and her third under Star Records, released on April 27, 2008 in the Philippines in CD format and digital download. The carrier single, "One Hello", which was originally done by Randy Crawford was used as the theme song of the Star Cinema-movie, When Love Begins. The second single, "Incapable", was a commercial failure receiving very limited radio airplay with no accompanying music video. "Take Me, I'll Follow", a Bobby Caldwell original was the album's third and final single.

As of August 2018, the album sold 25,000 units and 11,000 are pure sales. The record is the most streamed album of Gonzaga on Spotify Philippines, while "Someone's Always Saying Goodbye" garnered the most stream counts with more than 23 million.

The album contains 11 songs which composed of three OPM original (Note: Including an alternate version of "If I Give You My Heart") and seven revival tracks. It is her third studio album under Star Records, and was released on April 27, 2008. Toni stated that this album is very close to her, saying "Ang laki talaga ng pasasalamat ko sa Star Records dahil pinagkakatiwalaan nila ako with another album. Lahat ng kanta dito ay close to my heart at masaya ako nang i-record ko ang mga kanta" ([I] am very thankful to Star Records because they trusted me with another album. All of the songs here are close to my heart and I am happy when I started recording them). Moreover, according to Nixon Sy, Star Records' promo unit head, said "Her first album with Star Records, Toni: You Complete Me, was certified gold, and her sophomore album, Falling In Love, was awarded platinum. At such a young age, Toni is being recognized as one of the movers of the music industry and it's a privilege for Star Records to produce another winner for her."

== Singles ==
"One Hello", the lead single from the album, was originally recorded by American jazz and R&B singer Randy Crawford in 1982, and was also used as the theme song of the Star Cinema film, When Love Begins. "Incapable" was released as the second single from the album. The third and final single, "Take Me, I'll Follow", was originally recorded by Bobby Caldwell, for the movie Mac and Me in 1988.

== Other songs ==
"If I Give You My Heart" was launched as both a single and an official soundtrack for the 2010 Filipino romance film, Paano Na Kaya?, featuring performances by Kim Chiu and Gerald Anderson.

== Track listing ==
No.	Title	Writer(s)	Arranger(s)	Length
1.	"One Hello"	M. Hamlisch, C. BayerSager	Dominic Benedicto	03:24
2.	"Incapable"	Christian Martinez	Dominic Benedicto	04:20
3.	"You're In Love"	G. Ballard, C. Phillips, C. Wilson, W. Wilson	Bobby Velasco	04:41
4.	"If I Give You My Heart"	Christian Martinez	Dominic Benedicto	04:17
5.	"If Ever You're In My Arms Again" (featuring Sam Milby)	M. Masser, T. Snow, C. Weil	Arnold Jallares	04:16
6.	"Take Me, I'll Follow"	R. Cardwell, A. Silvestri	Paulo Zarate	04:57
7.	"Insensitive"	Ann Loree	Arnold Jallares	04:14
8.	"Steep"	Lauren Cristy	Rey Cantong	05:01
9.	"I've Been Waiting"	Jimmy Antiporda	Jimmy Antiporda	04:13
10.	"Someone's Always Saying Goodbye"	Vehnee Saturno	Marc Santos	04:05
11.	"If I Give You My Heart (alternate version)"	Christian Martinez	Paulo Zarate	04:36
Total length:				48:05

- track 1 - "One Hello" is a remake of an original song by Randy Crawford
- track 4 - "If I Gave You My Heart" is the theme song of the 2010 film, Paano Na Kaya.
- track 5 - "If Ever You're In My Arms Again" is a remake of an original song by Peabo Bryson and was used as the theme song of her leading role film My Big Love.

== Personnel ==
- Malou N. Santos – executive producer
- Annabelle Regaldo-Borja – executive producer
- Christian Martinez – over all album producer
- Rox B. Santos – associate album producer
- Roxy Liquigan – star adprom head
- Nixon Sy – star adprom head for audio
- Peewee Apostol – head, star song, inc
- Beth Faustino – music copyright coordinator
- Patrick Kevin Cabreba IV – album design
- Doc Marlon Pecjo – photography
- Pam Quiones – stylist
- Krist Bansuelo – make-up
- Macy Dionisio – hair & make-up

== Certifications ==
Country	Provider	Certification	Sales
Philippines	PARI	Gold	PHL sales: 25,000+
