= Toni Gonzaga (album) =

Studio album by Toni Gonzaga
- Released: July 26, 2002
- Recorded: 2001–02
- Genre: OPM, pop
- Length: 44:14
- Label: Prime Music
- Producer: Fredie Saturno

Toni Gonzaga chronology
Toni Gonzaga (2002)	You Complete Me (2006)

Singles from Toni Gonzaga
- 1. "Paano" Released: August 2002; 2. "Kung Sakali Man" Released: December 2002/January 2003

Toni Gonzaga is an independent and eponymous debut studio album under Prime Music Inc. released on July 26, 2002, in CD format only in the Philippines. All songs were recorded and mixed at Greenhill Sound Productions, Inc. The album was not known in years due to lack of promotions and the difficulty she faced in engaging with a bigger market, until Gonzaga herself in 2006 was given the chance to widely showcase her talent as a singer when she released her first commercial single, We Belong. However, Hanggang Ngayon Umaasa was Gonzaga's first credit as a songwriter.

In early 2013, Toni Gonzaga was adopted by Viva Video, Inc. for nationwide distribution, exclusively in Atroplus stores. The Viva team had made some changes on the album including the new set of tracks list from 5 to 11 numbers.

== Track listing ==
The track list was taken from Pinoy Exchange.

=== Toni Gonzaga ===
No.	Title	Length
1.	"Paano"	04:42
2.	"Akalain Ko Ba"	03:59
3.	"Bumibigay"	04:13
4.	"Akala Ko'y Para Sa 'Kin"	03:57
5.	"Kung Sakali Man"	03:37
6.	"Ngayon Lang"	04:13
7.	"Tunay Na Iniibig Kita"	04:00
8.	"Hanggang Ngayon Umaasa"	04:25
9.	"Dahil Sa Iyong Pagmamahal"	04:08
10.	"I Can't Afford To Love You Anymore"	03:10
11.	"Mahal Pa Rin Kita"	04:00
Total length:		44:14

2013 version

No.	Title	Writer(s)	Arranger(s)	Length
1.	"Paano"	Reymond A.F.	Ferdie M.	4:42
2.	"Akalain Ko Ba"	Boy C.	Tito C.	3:59
3.	"Bumibigay"	Irving L.	Tito C.	4:13
4.	"Akala Ko’y Para Sa ‘Kin"	Fredie S.	Dennis Q.	3:57
5.	"I Can’t Afford To Love You Anymore"	Irving L.	Alvin N.	3:10
6.	"Kung Sakali Man"	Boy C.	Alvin N.	3:37
7.	"Ngayon Lang"	Boy C.	Tito C.	4:13
8.	"Tunay Na Iniibig Kita"	Fredie S.	Tito C.	4:00
9.	"Mahal Pa Rin Kita"	Joni D.	Tito C.	4:00
10.	"Hanggang Ngayon Umaasa"	Toni G.	Alvin N.	4:25
11.	"Dahil Sa ‘Yong Pagmamahal"	Fredie S.	Alvin N.	4:08
Total length:				44:14

- track 1, "Paano" (How) was originally recorded by Gary Valenciano.
- track 1, "Akala Ko'y Para Sa 'Kin" (I Thought It Was Meant For Me) was originally recorded by Allona.

== Personnel ==
- Ricky C Lo –executive producer
- Fredie Saturno –album producer
- Fred M. Davis –overall consultant
- Joseph De Vera (of INX unlimited) –digital imaging expert and designer
- Raymund Isaac (of Prortfolio) –album photographer
- Dante San Pedro & Rick Meneses –recording engineers
- Dante San Pedro –mixing engineer
- Tito Cayamanda –additional guitarist for the tracks
- Jojo Villalva –addition vocal supervisor for song ‘’Paano’’ (except for ‘’Paano’’, produced by Nonoy Tan)
