= Celestine (album) =

2014 album by Toni Gonzaga

Studio album by Toni Gonzaga
- Released: May 20, 2014
- Recorded: April 2012 – March 2014
- Genres: Pop, OPM
- Length: 37:56
- Languages: English, Tagalog
- Label: Star Recording, Inc.
- Producer: Jonathan Manalo

Toni Gonzaga chronology
Greatest Hits (2011)	Celestine (2014)	My Love Story (2015)

Singles from "Celestine"
- 1. "Kahit Na" Released: January 7, 2013; 2. "This Love Is Like" Released: May 27, 2014; 3. "Awit Ni Ginny" Released: May 27, 2014; 4. "Finally" Released: June 12, 2015

Celestine is the sixth studio album of TV host-singer and actress, Toni Gonzaga, released under Star Records on May 20, 2014 in the Philippines in Digital format and on May 29 for physical release. The album's original release was scheduled in November 2013 but delayed due to many demands of her other projects including the completion of her most grossing film, Starting Over Again, her sitcom Home Sweetie Home, and her reality show The Voice of the Philippines. This is her first album to be released in four years after All Me in 2010.

Gonzaga claimed that Celestine is her most personal and best album keeping it with easy to relate tracks. Further, on October 3, 2014 was the announced concert date which was part of the promotional tool to support the album. The concert was extended on January 16, 2015 where in she performed at the Waterfront Cebu City Hotel.

It was certified gold record by PARI in January 2015. As of August 2018, the album sold 18,000 units and 8,000 were pure sales.

== Background ==
After being hailed as 2011 Female Concert Performer by the Guillermo Mendoza Memorial Foundation, multimedia star Gonzaga herself revealed that she is already working on her next (sixth) album.

The supposed recording sessions for the album was delayed for couple of times which hold the released of the project. But after the success of her most grossing film, Starting Over Again, as well in all time Filipino films excluding MMFF entries, and in the overseas screening, the album was finally scheduled to be released sometime in summer. Star Records announced the release date and album title on May 14 through their Facebook account which reposted and retweeted by Gonzaga for her fans on the following day.

Gonzaga confirmed Starting Over Again as one of the six tracks. The LP consists of 10 tracks with 7 original songs including Gonzaga's rendition of the said song above, Himig Handog entry Kahit Na, and Gonzaga's own compositions Awit Ni Ginny and This Love Is Like.

== Production ==
The title of the album was originally the idea of Jonathan Manalo, the album-producer, and at certain he researched the meaning of Celestine which an angel who killed most numbers of demons in ancient times. This album shows the creativity and passion of Gonzaga as an all-around Artist. In writing songs, she was able to produce two. The title of the single "This Love Is Like", originally Walkin' On Air, was changed due to the same song title released from Katy Perry's Prism. She claimed that "This Love Is Like" was an old record track of her before the latter. Gonzaga wrote Awit Ni Ginny (Song of Ginny) as the second lead single of the album. The song was originally called "Himlay" (Slumber), but Anthony Taberna of Umagang Kay Ganda cited that the title track was like a description of a funeral. The song title was suggested by her producer, Jonathan Manalo, he commented, "Since you played the role of Ginny in the film, why we don't use it." During the writing session, Toni was motivated by Olivia Lamasan, her director of Starting Over Again, and pushed herself to pour emotion to the song. The song was the most worked compared to the rest in the album. Jonathan noted, "we have 24 layers of harmonies for the song but if you try to listen (to the song), (it has a) rich texture of vocal parts done by Toni." Tony thinks that the arrangement of Starting Over Again by Manalo was great which make her excited to record it.

== Promotion ==
The album was first promoted on May 25 during her interview in The Buzz by Boy Abunda. After the album launch on June 8 in ASAP, Star Records started to support the album tour at the Eastwood open park on June 22 and ended at SM Fairview Atrium on August 9. Toni performed some of her songs on June 21 and 28 during the PBB Eviction night. 9 dates of mall tours are held nationwide after telecast. Gonzaga guested in Umagang Kay Ganda, DZMM Radyo Patrol 630, MOR 101.9 My Only Radio For Life!, Mornings @ ANC and attended a press conference on 10 June. Extending her rise as MYX Celebrity VJ for the month of July, and a guest performer in MYX Live!. October 3, 2014 is the date announced by Gonzaga herself from her Facebook account for her fifth major concert after her Toni@10: Anniversary Concert in 2011. This concert entitled, Celestine Toni Gonzaga.

== Awards and certifications ==
Celestine was certified gold record in January 2015, after nine months since it was released. Same year in November, the album won an award at the 7th PMPC Star Awards for Music for the category of Album Of The Year.

== Singles ==
"Kahit Na" was released on January 7, 2013. Written by, Bojam De Belen, the original version was interpreted by Gonzaga as a song entry for the Himig Handog 2013 and finished in fifth place. The remix version featured in the album has a different arrangement. Its music video were produced and directed by the students of University of the Philippines. The song was an early favorite during the live airing of it both in television and radios that cause it to enter in top 10 of most airplay charts in the Philippines. The strong rotation of airplay got heavier when the music video was released on the 2 February, premiered in Myx. It peaked at number 5 in Myx Hit Chart. Furthermore, it also debuted at number 24 and peaked at number 18 in the March 2013 issue of Philippines Top 40 Hit Singles, making it the second most successful entry in the competition in terms of airplay behind Daniel Padilla's Nasa Iyo Na Ang Lahat.

This Love Is Like and Awit Ni Ginny were simultaneously released on May 27, 2014 as the second and third single of the album. The singles were first premiered in MOR101.9 station on that date. Both tracks were written by Gonzaga. The music video of the first lead single premiered on July 29 at exactly 8:00pm. It was conceptualized as like pass access of her off-cam or behind the scene of her everyday activity. The single debuted at number one in the August 10–16 issue of MYX Hit Chart. This marked as Toni's third chart-topping single since Catch Me I'm Fallin' in 2007. The further success of the single extended in US and Canada through the inclusion of it on the list of SiriusXM radio station.

Finally was released as the final single of the album, on June 12, 2015.

== Track listing ==
No.	Title	Writer(s)	Producer(s)	Length
1.	"This Love Is Like"	Toni Gonzaga, Jonathan Manalo	Jonathan Manalo	03:59
2.	"Got You"	Christian Martinez	Christian Martinez	03:05
3.	"Awit Ni Ginny"	Toni Gonzaga	Jonathan Manalo	04:28
4.	"Finally"	Christian Martinez	Christian Martinez	03:53
5.	"Sweetest Song"	Christian Martinez, Jonathan Manalo	Jonathan Manalo	03:18
6.	"Oh Boy"	Francis "Kiko" Salazar	Francis "Kiko" Salazar	03:07
7.	"'Di Ba Halata" (with Romerico "Crazymix" Superable)	Lester "Klumcee" Vaño	Lester "Klumcee" Vaño	04:23
8.	"Kahit Na" (remix)	Jumbo De Belen	Lester "Klumcee" Vano	03:50
9.	"Starting Over Again"	Michael Masser, Gerald Goffin	Jonathan Manalo	04:06
10.	"This Love Is Like" (Moophs Remix)	Toni Gonzaga, Jonathan Manalo	RB "Kidwolf" Barbaso	03:39
Total length:				0:38.21

== Personnel ==
- Malou N. Santos – executive producer
- Roxy Liquigan – executive producer
- Jonathan Manalo – over all album producer
- Marivic Benedicto – star song, inc. and new media head
- Regie Sandal – sales and distribution head
- Darwin P. Chiang – OIC star receptionist
- Jayson E. Sarmiento – Promo Specialist
- Beth Faustino – music publishing officer
- Eaizen Almazan – new media technical assistant
- Abbey Aledo – music servicing officer
- Andrew Castillo – creative head for design and layout
- Lalic Lansang – additional photo rendering head
- Julienne Christine Adriano – additional photo rendering head
- Xander Angeles – photographer
- Krist Bansuelo – hair dresser and make-up artist
- AJ Alberto – Stylist
- Dante Tanedo – album mixer

== Certifications ==
Country (Provider)	Certifications
Philippines (PARI)	Gold

== Release history ==
Country	Edition	Release date	Label
Philippines	Digital download	May 20, 2014	Star Records
Philippines	CD	June 6, 2014	Star Records
