= Raymart Santiago =

Filipino TV host, actor, and comedian

- Born: Raymond Alan Martin Legaspi Santiago; July 20, 1973 (age 53); Manila, Philippines
- Occupations: Actor, TV host, comedian
- Years active: 1989–present
- Agent(s): Viva Artists Agency (1989–1998); ABS-CBN Studios (2018–2023); Sparkle GMA Artist Center (1998–2018; 2023–present)
- Spouse: Claudine Barretto (m. 2006; ann. 2013)
- Children: 2
- Parent(s): Pablo P. Santiago; Cielito Legaspi-Santiago
- Relatives: Randy Santiago (brother); Rowell Santiago (brother); Reily Pablo L. Santiago Jr. (brother); Pauleen Luna (niece)

Raymond Alan Martin Legaspi Santiago (born July 20, 1973) known for his screen name Raymart Santiago is a Filipino actor, comedian and host.

== Early life and education ==
Santiago was born on July 20, 1973 in Manila, Philippines, He grew up in a prominent showbiz family, being the youngest son of the late film director Pablo P. Santiago and actress Cielito Legaspi-Santiago. He attended and completed his high school education at La Salle Green Hills in Mandaluyong City.

== Acting career ==
After making his movie debut in Viva Films' youth comedy Estudyante Blues (Student Woes), Santiago became a Viva contract artist and began making guest appearances on television programs while continuing in high school.

Among the comedy movies he appeared in were Wooly Booly: Classmate kong Alien, Wooly Booly 2: Ang Titser kong Alien and Paikot-ikot. Not long after, Viva launched him as a junior comedian in the movie Rocky en Rolly, in which he starred opposite Jimmy Santos. The movie was a success, and he went on to Tootsie Wootsie, where he worked with Herbert Bautista and Keempee de Leon. Sometimes afterward, Santiago transitioned to action films with Angelito San Miguel: Batang City Jail, and went on to star in Magnong Rehas, Pita: Terror ng Kalookan, Noel Juico, Batang Kriminal, and Dillinger ng Dose Pares. His last major movie as an action star was Sgt. Santos: Batang Sundalo in 2001.

In 1998, Santiago signed up as a contract star for GMA Network, which gave him his first action-sitcom, Kool Ka Lang. The sitcom was initially directed by his brother Randy who gave it up after signing on as lead host of ABS-CBN's noontime show Magandang Tanghali Bayan. Kool Ka Lang aired through 2003. Santiago then teamed with Joey Marquez, Richard Gomez and Benjie Paras in Lagot Ka, Isusumbong Kita.

Santiago later starred in his third GMA sitcom, Who's Your Daddy Now?, where he played a father role for the first time. The show ran 13 episodes. Santiago then signed to do a primetime TV series opposite Dennis Trillo and Marky Cielo, titled Zaido: Pulis Pangkalawakan. From 2008 to 2009, he starred in the action-fantasy Gagambino. which was aired on GMA Network.

In 2009, Santiago was seen in Darna, where he plays a news photographer. The following year, Santiago returned to drama via Claudine, a weekly drama miniseries on GMA Network, appearing with his real wife, Claudine Baretto-Santiago. In 2016, Santiago returned to comedy with Tsuperhero.

In 2018, Santiago transferred to ABS-CBN, after being with GMA Network for 2 decades. He appeared in Starla and FPJ's Ang Probinsyano.

Santiago later returned to GMA Network in 2023, as he joined the cast of Black Rider.

== Controversy ==
On July 13, 2007, Santiago and his wife Claudine Barretto, admitted they did not know that Francswiss Investment —which accepted their money — was involved in a pyramid scam. Their lawyer, Ellen Veza, told NBI agents that the Barrettos had invested in Francswiss, but declined to say if they recruited other investors. Francswiss duped Filipinos of almost P1 billion.

== Personal life ==
Santiago married actress Claudine Barretto on March 27, 2006 at Tagaytay Highlands in Tagaytay, Cavite. The couple adopted a daughter, Sabina Natasha, at two months old in July 2004. Their son Santino was later born in 2008.

== Acting credits ==
=== Film ===
Key
†	Denotes films that have not yet been released

Raymart Santiago's film credits with year of release, film titles and roles
Year	Title	Role
1989	Estudyante Blues	Rupert
1989	Wooly Booly: Ang Classmate Kong Alien	----
1990	Tootsie Wootsie	----
1990	Love at First Sight	Reggie
1990	Paikot-ikot	----
1990	Tiny Terrestrial: The Three Professors	Matthew
1990	Teacher's Enemy No. 1	----
1990	Rocky and Rolly: Suntok Sabay Takbo	Rolly
1990	Ang Tister Kong Alien	----
1990	May Isang Tsuper ng Taxi	----
1991	Noel Juico Batang Kriminal	Noel Juico
1991	Angelito San Miguel at Ang Mga Batang City Jail	Angelito San Miguel
1992	Jaime Labrador: Sakristan Mayor	Jaime Labrador
1992	Dilinger	Ikoy
1992	Magnong Rehas	Magno
1993	Anak ng Pasig	Rodel
1993	Pita, Terror ng Kalookan	Pita
1993	Dodong Armado	Dodong
1994	Haring Daga	Dino Obrero
1994	Ikaw Lamang Wala Nang Iba	Joaquin
1995	Urban Rangers	Mark
1996	Leon Cordero: Duwag Lang ang Hahalik sa Lupa!	Leon Cordero
1996	Cara y Cruz: Walang Sinasanto!	Berting
1996	Mumbaki	Joseph (featuring Louie San Luis)
1997	Iskalawag: Ang Batas Ay Batas	Alex Sabater
1997	Frame Up: Ihahatid Kita sa Hukay	Reden Sarmiento
1998	Marahas: Walang Kilalang Batas	Ronaldo Sevilla
2004	Aishite Imasu 1941: Mahal Kita	Edilberto
2005	La Visa Loca	Estong
2013	10,000 Hours	N/A
2017	Haunted Forest	Aris
2024	Pula	Raymond Anacta

=== Television ===
Key
†	Denotes shows that have not yet been aired

Raymart Santiago's television credits with year of release, title(s) and role
Year	Title	Role	Ref.
1999–2003	Kool Ka Lang	Jack Mangalikot	
2003–2004	Narito ang Puso Ko	Rodolfo	
2003–2007	Lagot Ka, Isusumbong Kita	Toto	
2005	Kakabaka-Boo!	Various	
2005	Magpakailanman	Various	
2005	Noel	Various	
2005	Wag Kukurap	Various	
2005	Maynila	Various	
2006	You Are The One: The Claudine-Raymart Love Story	—N/a	
2007	Who's Your Daddy Now?	Mario	
2007–2008	Zaido: Pulis Pangkalawakan	Alvaro Lorenzo / Azur / Gamma	
2008–2009	Carlo J. Caparas' Gagambino	Dindo Gutierrez	
2009–2010	Mars Ravelo's Darna	Crisanto	
2010	Claudine: Alzhimer	Randy Salvador	
2010	Pilyang Kerubin	Arman Santos	
2010	GMA @ 60: The Heart Of Television Anniversary Special	Himself	
2010	Bantatay	Bernard Razon	
2010	Jillian: Namamasko Po	Erwin	
2011	Futbolilits	Frankie Ocampo	
2011	Spooky Nights: Perya	Jilmer	
2012	Daldalita	Tarzan	
2012	Luna Blanca	Luis Buenaluz	
2013	Home Sweet Home	Reden Caharian	
2013–2014	Villa Quintana	Felix Samonte†	
2015	Second Chances	Bernard Castello	
2015	Sabado Badoo	Cameo Footage Featured	
2015	Magpakailanman: Ang Kapangyarihan ng Nuno sa Punso	Max	
2015	Thank You Kapuso: GMA @ 65: GMA 65th Anniversary Special	Himself	
2016	Hanggang Makita Kang Muli	Larry Medrano	
2016	Tsuperhero	Freddie	
2017–2018	My Korean Jagiya	Eduardo "Dodong / Dong / Doods" Villanueva	
2019	Minute to Win It: Last Man Standing	Himself – Player	
2019–2020	Starla	Dr. Philip Manalo	
2019–2022	FPJ's Ang Probinsyano	Victor A. Basco†	
2020; 2023–present	It's Showtime	Himself – Guest host / Performer	
2021	Magandang Buhay	Himself – Guest	
2021	ABS-CBN Christmas Special 2021: Andito Tayo Para sa Isa't Isa	Himself – Performer	
2021–2023	ASAP	Himself – performer / host	
2023–2024	Black Rider	Gregorio Ricarte	
2026	Family Feud	Himself – Contestant	
2026	Never Say Die	Miguel Delgado	

== Accolades ==
Year	Work	Award	Category	Result	Ref.
1997	Mumbaki	Pinakamahusay na Pangunahing Aktor	Best Actor	Nominated	
2024	—N/a	3rd Gawad Dangal Filipino Awards	Empowered Celebrity of the '90s	Won	
2025	Pula	PinakaPASADOng Katuwang na Aktor	Best Supporting Actor	Nominated	
