= My Love Story (Toni Gonzaga album) =

Studio album by Toni Gonzaga
- Released: October 17, 2015
- Recorded: April – September 2015
- Genres: Pop, adult contemporary, OPM
- Length: 34:37
- Language: English
- Label: Star Recording, Inc.
- Producers: Malou N. Santos (executive); Roxy A. Liquigan (executive); Jonathan Manalo (over-all album project head)

Toni Gonzaga chronology
Celestine (2014)	My Love Story (2015)

Singles from "My Love Story"
- 1. "Baby Now That I've Found You" Released: October 14, 2015

My Love Story is the seventh studio album of Toni Gonzaga under Star Records released on October 17, 2015, on Spotify, six days later on iTunes Philippines, and November 13 for CD format in the Philippines.

Gonzaga described the album as a collection of theme songs that tell the story of her love with her husband. By August 2018, the album had sold 7,000 units, with 5,000 of those being pure sales.

== Background ==
Gonzaga first announced the details of her seventh album through her Instagram account in October. In same month, StarMusic Philippines officially announced the release date of the album and single through Instagram.

''It’s time for the ULTIMATE COMEBACK!,'' noted.

Toni was inspired to do the LP after her wedding in June with Director Paul Soriano. She recalls it and the courtship of Soriano years ago. There are seven songs which consist of six revivals and the rearranged and newly mastered version of her 2007 hit, Catch Me, I’m Falling.

In addition, she believes that the set of songs were perfectly suits the story of love that she does with her husband. The entire album is like a short story of their shared love to each other which transpired and themed through music.

“Music moves you in different ways. And when you’re in love, it echoes the emotional chord of your heart,” Gonzaga said.

Prior to its release, she simultaneously performed each song on ASAP.

== Production ==
The music and arrangement was done by herself and long-time professional partner, Jonathan Manalo. The selection of songs was chosen by Gonzaga herself. She also decided to do Interlude for each song which she talks about the details of courtship of Soriano. The last track is Catch Me, I’m Falling. It is sung and recorded dramatically compared to the 2007 version, with complete accompaniment of strings and piano.

== Promotion ==
In October 2015, Gonzaga already sung Baby Now That I've Found You in various events including Acer campaign and others. Months later in January 2016, Star Music Philippines announced the official date list of her tour in February which started at Eastwood Open Park and SM City Baliwag a day after. Then in Vizayas region in March. She took rest after her Vistamall Taguig in Taguig on the 26th of the month. 2 months later, she announced the 9th and last date which is on June 1, 2016, at SM City Trere Martires. As part of the album promotion, Gonzaga shared her Love Story Documentary on MYX Philippines on June 9, 2016.

== Singles ==
Baby, Now That I've Found You was the first single of the album. It was released on October 14, 2015, which premiered exclusively on MOR 101.9 radio station.

== Track listing ==
No.	Title	Writer(s)	Producer(s)	Length
1.	"Love Story Intro"			01:06
2.	"When You Say Nothing At All"	Schlitz, Donald Alan Jr., Overstreet, Paul L.	Jonathan Manalo	03:46
3.	"Love Story Interlude 1"			01:08
4.	"You And Me"	Jason Wade, Jude Cole	Jonathan Manalo	03:37
5.	"Love Story Interlude 2"			01:12
6.	"Your Love (The Greatest Gift of All)"	Brickman, James Marrill, De Viller, Dane Anthony & Hosein, Syed Sean	Jonathan Manalo	03:05
7.	"Love Story Interlude 3"			00:49
8.	"Baby Now That I’ve Found You"	John MacLeod, Tony Macaulay	Jonathan Manalo	03:47
9.	"Love Story Interlude 4"			00:46
10.	"I Won’t Give Up"	Jason Mraz, Michael Natter	Jonathan Manalo	04:39
11.	"Love Story Interlude 5"			01:15
12.	"Falling Slowly"	Glen Hansard, Markéta Irglová	Jonathan Manalo	03:40
13.	"Love Story Interlude 6"			00:54
14.	"Catch Me I’m Falling" (2015 Version)	Christian Martinez	Jonathan Manalo	04:22
Total length:				34:37

== Personnel ==
- Executive Producers – Malou N. Santos & Roxy LLiquigan
- A & R Audio Content Head / Over-all Album Producer – Jonathan Manalo
- Star Songs, Inc. & New Media Head – Marivic Benedicto
- Sales & Distribution – Regie Sandel
- Star Event Officer – Darwin Chiang
- Promo Specialist – Jason Sarmiento
- Promo Associate – Jholina Luspo
- Music Publishing Officer – Beth Faustino
- New Media Technical Assistant – Eaizen Almazan
- Licensing Officer – Selwin Scotts de Jesus
- Music Servicing Officer – Abbey Aledo
- Graphic Design & Layout – Christine Joy I. Cheng
- Creative Head – Andrew Castillo
- Photographer – Pat Dy
- Hair Stylist – Macy Dionido
- Make-up Artist – Krist Bansuelo
- Stylists – Veronica Gonzales, Miyuki Nishida, & Raj Rivera
- Album Mixed & Mastered by Dante Tañedo

== Release history ==
Country	Edition	Release date	Label
Philippines	Streaming	October 17, 2015	Star Records
Philippines	Digital Download	October 23, 2015	Star Records
Philippines	CD	November 13, 2015	Star Records
