= Jaymee Joaquin =

Filipino actress (1979–2023)

- Born: Jaymee Geronimo Topacio; July 27, 1979; San Juan, Metro Manila, Philippines
- Died: October 18, 2023 (aged 44); California, U.S.
- Other name: Jaymee Wins
- Occupations: Television and events presenter; actress; content creator
- Years active: 1998–2010; 2016–2023
- Agent: Star Magic (2004–2010)

Jaymee Joaquin (born Jaymee Geronimo Topacio, July 27, 1979 – October 18, 2023) was a Filipino actress, model, host, social media content creator, and author. She made a career in the Philippines as a television and print commercial model during her younger years and ventured in events promotion and hosting on the side.

== Life and career ==
After years of auditioning in the modeling scene, she became a part of ABS-CBN Star Magic, an artist management firm owned by ABS-CBN Broadcasting Corporation. Joaquin landed supporting roles for movies, soap operas, sitcoms, and various TV programs.

But it was her hosting stint that started in 2006 as the game show anchor for the daily midnight show Games Uplate Live that gave her the recognition. She was known from her tagline "Kabagang!" Joaquin was nominated as "Best Game Show Host" for the Philippine Movie Press Club (PMPC) Star Awards in 2007. She also hosted various live events and became the darling of local men's magazines. Jaymee was chosen as the September 2008 cover girl of Playboy Philippines. For 5 consecutive years (2006–2010), she was hailed one of the country's sexiest celebrities by FHM Philippines.

Joaquin left her showbiz career in 2010 to study a Communications & Tourism course in Sydney, Australia for almost 2 years. Then she lived in Madrid, Spain for 4 years to work as an English (as foreign language) teacher known as "Teacher Jaymee" from 2011 to 2015. She also did some commercial modeling on the side while exploring various cities in Europe. In mid-2015, she got based in San Diego, California involved in the hotel industry while desiring to pursue a career in entertainment and media.

In October 2016, she was diagnosed with early stage breast cancer and underwent treatment in 2017 at the UCSD Moores Cancer Center in San Diego, California. She documented her life journey on social media with a moniker "Jaymee Wins" to create awareness and bring inspiration to the general public especially those going through life adversities. She had an early metastasis in 2018 and had been on preventative treatment since then. Jaymee was establishing a presence in social media, working as a commercial talent and creating digital content in Southern California.

In January 2020, she released her podcast WIN Your Daily Battles, followed by her first self-published book “That Sh*t Called Cancer”. In 2022, her first self-published children’s picture book “No-Hair Mama, Don’t Care” came out to help moms diagnosed with breast cancer explain to their little one what it’s like to go on chemotherapy in a light-hearted way. She was also producing a documentary and a feature film that brings light to the realities of a cancer diagnosis.

== Death ==
Joaquin died from cancer in San Diego, California, US, on October 18, 2023, at the age of 44.

== Filmography ==
=== TV shows ===
- Bora - Peachy (2005)
- Showbiz No. 1 - Showbiz Field Reporter (2005)
- Sharon - Segment Host (2006)
- Super Inggo 1.5: Ang Bagong Bangis - Bianca Bangkera a.k.a. Barrakuda (2007)
- Games Uplate Live - Game Show Jock (2006–2009)
- Ligaw na Bulaklak - Rita (2008)
- Parekoy - Beverly & Lyka Biscotti (2009)
- Habang May Buhay - Nurse Shaira (2010)

=== Movies ===
- Shake, Rattle and Roll 9 - Tatin (2007)
- My Big Love - Gela (2008)
- Walong Linggo - as herself (2008)
- Tanging Ina Ninyong Lahat - Karina Devila (2008)
