= Laila Chikadora =

Filipino TV and former radio personality

- Born: Jessica R. Asis; December 24, 1979 (age 46); Manila, Philippines
- Occupations: TV host, former radio personality
- Years active: 2001–2026 (radio); 2008–present (television)

Jessica R. Asis, professionally known by the names DJ Laila, Laila Chikadora, and Laila Chikadora Pangilinan (Tagalog: [ˈlɐjlɐ tʃikaˈdɔɾa]), is a former radio DJ and TV personality in the Philippines. She is formerly a radio DJ of 105.9 True FM and a current entertainment reporter of TV5 News.

== Filmography ==
=== TV shows ===
Year	Title	Role
2008–2009	Games Uplate Live	Host
2011	Lupet	
2012	Kahit Mabuhay Kang Muli	
2013	TROPADS	
2025	Gud Morning Kapatid	
2025	Face To Face with Ate Koring	

=== Radio shows ===
- Gising Pilipinas (showbiz segment; DZMM)
- Laugh-Out-Loud (DZMM)
- Soundtrip (101.9 For Life!)
- Sunday Big Time Pinoy (101.9 For Life!)
- UKI Na! (Umagang Kay Ingay!) with Laila Chikadora (103.5 Wow FM)
- ShowBisto with Tsongki Benj (Radyo5 92.3 News FM)
- Night Chat with Tsongki Benj and Hans Mortel (Radyo5 92.3 News FM)
- Morning Calls with Laila Chikadora (Radyo5 92.3 News FM)
- Todo Bigay with Laila Chikadora and Shalala (Radyo5 92.3 News FM)
- Good Vibes with Laila Chikadora and Stanley Chi (Radyo5 92.3 News FM)
- Shout Out! with Laila Chikadora (105.9 True FM)
