= Pula (film) =

2024 Philippine film

- Official release poster
- Directed by: Brillante Mendoza
- Screenplay by: Reynold Giba
- Story by: Brillante Mendoza
- Produced by: Krisma Fajardo; Angela Mendoza
- Starring: Coco Martin; Julia Montes; Raymart Santiago; Christine Bermas; Lotlot de Leon; Allan Paule; Elizabeth Oropesa; Vince Rillon; Ina Alegre
- Cinematography: Freidric Macapagal Cortez; Jao Daniel Elamparo; Jeffrey Icawat
- Edited by: Peter Arian Vito
- Music by: Jake Abella
- Production companies: CCM Film Production; Center Stage Production
- Distributed by: Netflix
- Release date: May 3, 2024
- Running time: 114 minutes
- Country: Philippines
- Language: Filipino

Pula (lit. 'Red') is a 2024 Philippine independent crime drama thriller film from the screenplay of Reynold Giba, story and directed by Brillante Mendoza. It stars Coco Martin, Julia Montes, Raymart Santiago, Christine Bermas, Lotlot de Leon, Allan Paule, Elizabeth Oropesa, Vince Rillon and Ina Alegre. The film is about a police man who is working on the murder case of a student. The film mark as the reunion project of Mendoza and Martin.

The film released worldwide on Netflix, despite negative reviews it reached number 1 spot on Netflix's top 10 movies in the Philippines.

== Synopsis ==
A close-knit community's foundations are shaken by a tragic event: a teenage girl's murder. Senior Master Sergeant Daniel Faraon embarks on a path of retribution, entangled in deception and betrayal.

== Cast ==
- Coco Martin as PSMS Daniel Faraon, a Senior Master Sergeant in the town of Pola. (Note: The character's rank is based on R.A. No. 11200, the current law prescribing police ranks in the Philippines)
- Julia Montes as Magda Faraon, Daniel's pregnant wife and schoolteacher.
- Raymart Santiago as PCPT Raymond Anacta, the chief of police in Pola and Daniel's superior.
- Christine Bermas as Patricia "Tricia" Rivera, a 15-year-old teenage girl.
- Lotlot de Leon as Elena Rivera, Tricia's mother.
- Allan Paule as Canor Rivera, Tricia's father.
- Elizabeth Oropesa as Aling Rosa, a local elder.
- Vince Rillon as Jeff, Tricia's boyfriend.
- Ina Alegre as PMsg. Ramona Abella, a Master Sergeant and Daniel's colleague.

== Production ==
The confirmed cast and crew started filming in July 2021 including Coco Martin, Julia Montes, Allan Paule, Lotlot de Leon, Ina Alegre and Raymart Santiago in Pola, Oriental Mindoro. The film had a working title The Policeman. The cast were in a lock-in shooting because of the COVID-19 pandemic.

== Release ==
The film was released worldwide on Netflix on May 3, 2024.

== Reception ==
The movie received a score of 27/100 from 9 reviews according to review aggregator website Kritikultura, indicating generally negative reviews.

Goldwin Reviews gave the film a rating of -1 over 5 and said (translated in English): It's sad because Julia Montes went to this kind of film of Coco Martin. There's one scene where she had a breakdown. You will not pity on her character instead you will pity because of how she was good in acting, but the film is still ugly.

=== Accolades ===
Accolades received by Pula
Award	Date of ceremony	Category	Recipient(s)	Result	Ref.
27th Gawad Pasado	October 25, 2025	Pinakapasadong Direktor	Brillante Mendoza	Nominated	
27th Gawad Pasado	October 25, 2025	Pinakapasadong Aktor	Coco Martin	Nominated	
27th Gawad Pasado	October 25, 2025	Pinakapasadong Katuwang Na Aktor	Raymart Santiago	Nominated	
27th Gawad Pasado	October 25, 2025	Pinakapasadong Disenyong Produksyon	Brillante Mendoza	Nominated	
27th Gawad Pasado	October 25, 2025	Pinakapasadong Sinematograpiya	Freidric Macapagal Cortez, Jao Daniel Elamparo, Jeffrey Icawat	Nominated	
27th Gawad Pasado	October 25, 2025	Pinakapasadong Tunog	Albert Michael Idioma	Nominated	
