= Love Duets (Toni Gonzaga and Sam Milby album) =

Studio album by Toni Gonzaga and Sam Milby
- Released: February 20, 2009
- Recorded: 2006–2008
- Genre: Pop
- Length: 40:07
- Language: English
- Label: Star Recording, Inc.
- Producer: Malou N. Santos (executive); Annabelle M. Regalado-Borja (executive); Jimmy Antiporda (over-all album)

Toni Gonzaga and Sam Milby chronology
Love Is... (2008)	Love Duets (2009)	All Me (2010)

Singles from Love Duets
- 1. "Suddenly" Released: January 2009; 2. "If Ever You're in My Arms Again" Released: March 2009; 3. "(I've Had) The Time of My Life" Released: June 2009; 4. "Way Back Into Love" Released: September 2009

Love Duets is a full-length English-language debut duet album by the Filipino TV host, actress, and singer Toni Gonzaga (her fifth album over all) and the Filipino-American actor, singer, songwriter and model Sam Milby (his third album), both under the management of Star Records. The album was released on February 20, 2009, in the Philippines in CD and digital download formats and made available in many online stores like in iTunes Philippines and Amazon.com.

The first single from the album, "If Ever You're in My Arms Again", became a mainstream hit and entered many Philippine charts, including the Philippines Top 40 Hits, where it reached the number 2 spot. The track was also used as the theme song of the film My Big Love, produced by Star Cinema, in which Gonzaga and Milby play the lead roles. The second single, "Suddenly", received only limited airplay.

== Track listing ==
=== Love Duets ===
No.	Title	Writer(s)	Arranger(s)	Length
1.	"Cruisin'"	Smokey Robinson	Jimmy Antiporda	03:49
2.	"Suddenly"	John Farrar	Arnold Jallores	04:44
3.	"Against All Odds"	Phil Collins	Jimmy Antiporda	04:06
4.	"Way Back Into Love"	Adam Schlesinger	Jimmy Antiporda	03:18
5.	"(I've Had) The Time of My Life"	Frank Previte, John DeNicola & Donald Markowitz	Jimmy Antiporda	03:13
6.	"Sometimes When We Touch/After All (medley)"	Dan Hill/Barry Man, Dean Pitford/Tom Snow	Jimmy Antiporda	04:08
7.	"If Ever You're in My Arms Again"	Michael Masser, T. Snow & C. Weil	Arnold Jallores, Jonathan Manalo	03:03
8.	"In Love With You"	J. Laudon	Paolo Zarate, Jonathan Manalo	03:03
9.	"You Are the One"	Anthony Feliciano	Arnold Jallores, Civ Fontanilla	04:42
Total length:				40:07

== Personnel ==
Credits taken from the album notes and Titik Pilipino

- Malou N. Santos & Annabelle M. Regalado-Borja – executive producers
- Jimmy Antiporda – over-all album producer
- Jonathan Manalo – supervising producer/A&R
- Roque "rox" Santos – over-all project coordinator
- Roxy Liquigan – star adprom director
- Nixon Sy – star adprom head for audio
- David Halili – promo specialist
- Peewee Apostol – head, star songs, inc.
- Beth Faustino – music copyright coordinator
- Barbie Chan – make-up artist for Sam Milby
- Jing Monis – Make-up artist for Toni Gonzaga
- Raymond Bajarias & Elfrn Vibar – stylists
- Andrew Castillo – graphic designer
- Jun De Leon of Wings Photography – album photographer

== Certifications ==
Country	Provider	Certification	Sales
Philippines	PARI	Gold	PHL sales: 12,000+
