= Games Uplate Live =

Late night game show aired by ABS-CBN

- Genre: Game show
- Presented by: Jaymee Joaquin; DJ Laila
- Country of origin: Philippines
- Original language: Filipino
- No. of seasons: 7

Production
- Executive producer: Tony Dela Cruz
- Running time: 1 hour
- Production company: Endemol

Original release
- Network: ABS-CBN
- Release: August 7, 2006 – October 2, 2009

Related
- Pinoy Big Brother UpLate; Music Uplate Live

Games Uplate Live is a Philippine television game show broadcast by ABS-CBN. Originally hosted by Jaymee Joaquin, it premiered on August 7, 2006. It showcases various interactive games such as word games, anagrams, puzzles as well as math problems that contestants must solve in order to win. It also features live chat services. In order to register for the show, viewers must download the picture message, logo, MMS, or ringtone of the day by messaging the text code "UP" to 2366. The names of the texters that have registered are then placed in a bowl, out of which one name is drawn out of per night. The person whose name is pulled out will receive a call asking them to participate in the show.

In 2008, DJ Laila took over the hosting duties until its cancellation on October 2, 2009 to give way to Pinoy Big Brother: Double UpLate

== Host ==
- Jaymee Joaquin (2006-2008)
- DJ Laila (2008-2009)

== See also ==
- List of programs broadcast by ABS-CBN
