= You Complete Me (album) =

Toni: You Complete Me

Studio album by Toni Gonzaga
- Released: April 2006
- Genre: Pop, adult contemporary, OPM
- Length: 26:26
- Language: English, Filipino, Tagalog
- Label: Star Recording, Inc.
- Producer: Annabelle M. Regalado (executive); Christian Martinez; Jonathan Manalo

Toni Gonzaga chronology
| Toni Gonzaga (2002) | Toni: You Complete Me (2006) | Falling In Love (2007) |

Repackage album cover
- Repackaged CD cover

Singles from Toni: You Complete Me
- 1. "We Belong" Released: December 2005/February 2006; 2. "Kung Kaya Ko" Released: 2006; 3. "Kapag Tumibok Ang Puso" Released: 2006; 4. "You Are The One" Released: 2007

Toni: You Complete Me is the second studio album of Filipino TV host, actress-singer Toni Gonzaga and her debut album in Star Records, released in April 2006 in the Philippines in CD and release a repackaged album through digital download on iTunes and Amazon.com.

== Background ==
Toni: You Complete Me includes 7 tracks with cover songs from Donna Cruz, The Cardigans and Dionne Warwick. The album includes her original composition "Kung Kaya Ko". and cover songs "Love Fool" of The Cardigans which is also from the soundtrack of the Baz Luhrmann's Hollywood film Romeo + Juliet and "Kapag Tumibok Ang Puso" originally done by Donna Cruz and also one of her favorite songs. The carrier single is "We Belong" composed by Christian Martinez. The repackaged album includes the acoustic cover of "Crazy For You" originally done by Madonna and the movie version of "You Are The One", a duet with Sam Milby. The album is awarded gold certified by the Philippine Association of the Record Industry (PARI).

== Track listing ==
=== Toni: You Complete Me ===
| No. | Title | Writer(s) | Arranger(s) | Length |
|---|---|---|---|---|
| 1. | "We Belong" | Christian Martinez | Albert Tamayo | 03:49 |
| 2. | "You Are The One" (with Sam Milby) | Anthony Feliciano | Arnold Jallores | 04:44 |
| 3. | "Kung Kaya Ko" | Toni Gonzaga | Albert Tamayo | 04:07 |
| 4. | "Love Fool" | Nina Persson, Peter Svensson | Albert Tamayo | 03:18 |
| 5. | "Wishin' & Hopin'" | Burt Bacharach, Hal David | Jonathan Manalo | 03:13 |
| 6. | "Kapag Tumibok Ang Puso" | Aaron Paul Del Rosario | Albert Tamayo | 04:07 |
| 7. | "Gandang Tumatagal" (Palmolive Naturals Conditioner theme song) | Eric Juan C. Lava | Albert Tamayo | 03:03 |

- track 1 “We Belong“ samples Hikaru Utada's “First Love“
- track 2 “You Are The One” is a remake of an original song by the Serenity band.
- track 5 “Wishin' And Hopin'” is a remake of an original song by Dionne Warwick.

=== Toni: You Complete Me (Repackaged) ===
| No. | Title | Writer(s) | Arranger(s) | Length |
|---|---|---|---|---|
| 1. | "Crazy For You" | John Bettis, Jon Lind | Albert Tamayo | 03:51 |
| 2. | "We Belong" | Christian Martinez | Albert Tamayo | 03:49 |
| 3. | "You Are The One" (with Sam Milby) | Anthony Feliciano | Arnold Jallores | 04:44 |
| 4. | "Kung Kaya Ko" | Toni Gonzaga | Albert Tamayo | 04:06 |
| 5. | "Love Fool" | Nina Persson, Peter Svensson | Albert Tamayo | 03:18 |
| 6. | "Wishin' & Hopin'" | Burt Bacharach, Hal David | Jonathan Manalo | 03:13 |
| 7. | "Kapag Tumibok Ang Puso" | Aaron Paul Del Rosario | Albert Tamayo | 04:08 |
| 8. | "Gandang Tumatagal" (Palmolive Naturals Conditioner theme song) | Eric Juan C. Lava | Albert Tamayo | 03:03 |
| 9. | "You Are The One (movie version)" (with Sam Milby) | Anthony Feliciano | Arnold Jallores | 04:42 |

- track 1 "Crazy For You" is a remake of an original song by Madonna and was featured as the theme song of ABS-CBN's Crazy For You.
- track 2 “We Belong“ samples Hikaru Utada's "First Love".
- track 3 “You Are The One” is a remake of an original song by the Serenity band.
- track 5 “Wishin' And Hopin'” is a remake of an original song by Dionne Warwick.

== Personnel ==
Credits taken from the album notes and Titik Pilipino

- Annabelle M. Regalado – executive producer
- Christian Martinez – producer
- Civ Fontanilla – album supervision
- Monina B. Quejano – album coordination
- Beth Faustino – music publishing coordination (Star Songs, Inc.)
- Peewee Apostol – music publishing coordination (Star Sogs, Inc.)
- Norman Albert V. Santiago – operations
- Nixon Sy – cover concept
- Jojie Mangabat – cover concept
- Andrew S. Castillo – cover lay-out & design
- Marlon Pecjo – photography
- Edwin Tan – stylist
- Jinky Illusorio – make-up
- Marlon Suarez – hair

== Certifications ==
| Country | Provider | Certification | Sales |
|---|---|---|---|
| Philippines | PARI | Gold | PHL sales: 25,000+ |
