= Toni Gonzaga =

Filipino actress, singer, and host (born 1984)

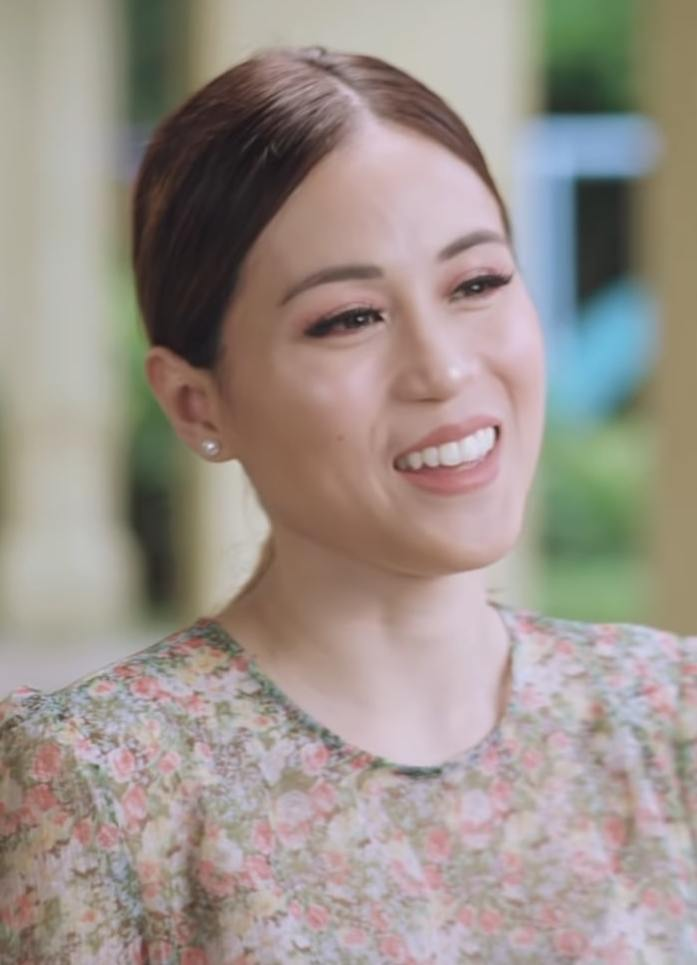
- Gonzaga in 2019
- Born: Celestine Cruz Gonzaga; January 20, 1984 (age 42); Taytay, Rizal, Philippines
- Occupations: Actress; host; singer; brand endorser; producer; businesswoman
- Years active: 1997–present
- Spouse: Paul Soriano (m. 2015)
- Children: 2
- Family: Alex Gonzaga (sister); Mikee Morada (brother-in-law)
- Awards: Full list
- Musical career
- Genres: Pop; soul; R&B; adult contemporary; OPM; novelty
- Instrument: Vocals
- Years active: 2001–present
- Labels: Prime Music; Star Music

YouTube information
- Channel: Toni Gonzaga Studio
- Years active: 2019–present
- Genre: Inspirational
- Subscribers: 8.08 million
- Views: 846 million
- Last updated: October 21, 2025

Celestine "Toni" Cruz Gonzaga (born January 20, 1984) is a Filipino actress, singer, and television presenter. She is known for her roles in romantic comedies and dramas, as well as for her work in reality shows. Gonzaga received many accolades including a FAMAS Award, 11 Box Office Entertainment Awards, four Star Awards for Music, 14 Star Awards for Television, and was recognized by Tatler magazine as one of the most influential people in Asia in 2021 and 2022.

After joining the reality singing competition Metropop Star Search in 1997, Gonzaga rose to prominence after appearing in a television commercial in 2001. She gained further recognition as the lead host of the reality show Pinoy Big Brother from 2005 until her departure in 2022. She received a Box Office Entertainment Award for her role as a government employee in You Are the One (2006), which was the first of her collaborations with actor Sam Milby. Her performance in Starting Over Again (2014) earned her a FAMAS Award for Best Actress, and she was named the Box Office Queen at the 2015 Box Office Entertainment Awards. Gonzaga also hosted the reality shows The Voice of the Philippines (2013), The Voice Teens (2017), and The Voice Kids (2019).

As a singer, Gonzaga has released eight studio albums. Following the failure of her debut album Toni Gonzaga (2002), she released her first album under Star Music, You Complete Me (2006). Her third album, Falling in Love (2007), received a platinum certification by the Philippine Association of the Record Industry (PARI), while Celestine (2014) was named Album of the Year at the 7th Star Awards for Music. Gonzaga is the founder of the production company Tincan Productions, and expanded to becoming a YouTuber when she launched her YouTube channel, Toni Gonzaga Studio, in 2019.

== Early life and career beginnings ==
Celestine Cruz Gonzaga was born on January 20, 1984, in Taytay, Rizal. Her mother, Crisanta "Pinty" Cruz, worked as a financial manager for a bus company. Her father, Carlito "Bonoy" Gonzaga, served as the vice mayor of Taytay. Her younger sister, Catherine "Alex", is an actress, singer, and comedian. Gonzaga studied at the United Methodist Christian School in Taytay. In college, she studied mass communication at the Dominican College in San Juan, and on her third year, she transferred to the Asian Institute for Distance Education, shifting her course to Bachelor of Arts in English through homeschooling, before dropping out to focus on her entertainment career.

At age nine, Gonzaga unsuccessfully auditioned for a role in a stage musical. In 1997, at age 13, she participated in the reality singing competition Metropop Star Search, but lost the competition. During her first year of college, she worked in different hotels as a lounge singer, and a guest wished Gonzaga would pursue a music career. In 1997, she signed a contract with GMA Artist Center, and she took part in the comedy show Bubble Gang.

== Acting and hosting career ==
=== 2001–2009: Rise to prominence ===
In 2001, at age 17, Gonzaga appeared in a television advertisement for the soft drink Sprite. Having no prior experience as a lead actor in the commercial, she was cast as the lead role over multiple candidates. She screamed at actor Piolo Pascual: "I love you, Piolo!" This caught the attention of actor Vic Sotto, who cast her as a guest in the sitcom Daddy Di Do Du. The following year, she was a host of the noontime variety show Eat Bulaga! She also appeared in the drama series Habang Kapiling Ka. Gonzaga made her feature film debut in the 2003 action comedy Pakners. In 2004, she appeared in the news satire show Wazzup Wazzup.

Gonzaga signed a management contract with ABS-CBN in 2005. In the same year, she co-starred alongside Vhong Navarro in Joyce Bernal's comedy horror film D' Anothers. She began filming her scenes in January 2005, when her contract with ABS-CBN was finalized. She also became a host of the reality competition show Pinoy Big Brother, the Philippine version of the Dutch reality franchise Big Brother. In 2006, she co-starred alongside Sam Milby in Cathy Garcia-Molina's romantic comedy You Are the One. She played Sally, a government employee whose U.S. travel visa was denied by immigration officer Will (Milby) in an attempt to immigrate to the United States. Philip Cu-Unjieng of The Philippine Star praised Gonzaga's performance, writing that "her willingness to be a physical comedienne is brought to full force." By contrast, Nestor Torre Jr. of the Philippine Daily Inquirer wrote that "Gonzaga's problem is the fact that her leading man is better-looking than she is. And she's also a rather nervous and twitchy performer, acting pert and sassy much too relentlessly." Gonzaga was named the Princess of Philippine Movies at the 2007 Box Office Entertainment Awards.

Gonzaga co-starred alongside Milby and Zanjoe Marudo in her only film of 2007, the action comedy You Got Me! (2007). In preparation for her role as a police officer, she underwent extensive training and learned to do stunts. Jocelyn Dimaculangan of the Philippine Entertainment Portal (PEP) criticized Gonzaga's decision to not use a stunt double during filming, but nonetheless wrote that "It's quite unnatural to see the usually bubbly Toni hold herself back while acting for this movie. But when it comes to her dramatic scenes, you can see her being very sincere and open." Gonzaga starred in the romantic drama series Maging Sino Ka Man: Ang Pagbabalik, the sequel of the 2006 series Maging Sino Ka Man; the series aired from December 17, 2007, to March 28, 2008. She then starred in two romantic comedy films in 2008. Her first film of the year, My Big Love, saw Gonzaga portray a fitness instructor to Milby's character. Next, she reunited with Navarro in My Only Ü. 2009 saw Gonzaga collaborate with director Wenn V. Deramas in two projects. She played a hotel maid in the drama series, Ang Lalaking Nagmahal Sa Akin. Her only film that year was in the comedy Ang Tanging Pamilya.

=== 2010–2015: Commercial successes ===
Gonzaga co-starred alongside actor John Lloyd Cruz in the 2010 romantic comedy My Amnesia Girl. She played Irene, a girl who has no memory over her former boyfriend Apollo (Cruz). A commercial success, it was the highest-grossing Philippine film of 2010, grossing ₱144.8 million (US$3.24 million) at the box office. Gonzaga was named Princess of Philippine Movies at the 2011 Box Office Entertainment Awards. She also became a host of the talk show The Buzz. Gonzaga had her only film appearance of 2011 in the Jose Javier Reyes-directed comedy Wedding Tayo, Wedding Hindi, co-starring alongside Marudo, Eugene Domingo, and Wendell Ramos. In the film, she played a former entertainer who worked in Japan and returned home to marry her boyfriend (Marudo). Critic Jocelyn Valle of PEP highlighted Gonzaga's comedic performance, and wrote that she was "especially effective in showing the transformation of her character". She worked with Deramas again in the film This Guy's in Love with U Mare! (2012). She played Gemma, a girl who is to marry Lester (Vice Ganda) after Lester ended his relationship with Mike (Luis Manzano). It grossed over ₱200 million (US$4.75 million) at the box office, and Gonzaga was named Princess of Philippine Movies for the third time in her career.

In 2013, Gonzaga co-starred alongside actresses Bea Alonzo, Angel Locsin, and Shaina Magdayao in the comedy drama film Four Sisters and a Wedding. She played one of the four sisters who schemes to prevent his brother (played by Enchong Dee) from marrying. PEP's Jennifer Dugena described Gonzaga's portrayal as "loud, earnest and light". Rito Asilo of the Philippine Daily Inquirer praised one of her comedic scenes, also writing that "there's more to Toni than her winkingly gleeful antics". Conversely, Rappler's Carljoe Javier gave a mixed review, praising the cast but criticizing Gonzaga's performance. Her performance earned her a nomination for the FAMAS Award for Best Actress. Gonzaga also served as the host of the reality show The Voice of the Philippines, based on the Dutch franchise The Voice. In 2014, she starred in the sitcom Home Sweetie Home. Earl Villanueva of PEP wrote that "[Gonzaga] played a character that is too similar to characters she played before, making it a bit of a problem for [her character] to stand out as a fresh persona. Nevertheless, [she] was still effective making [her role]".

Also in 2014, Gonzaga co-starred alongside Piolo Pascual in Starting Over Again, a romantic comedy about the relationship of a former university student and an academic professor. Asilo praised Gonzaga's performance, adding that "her shifts from comedy to drama, and back again, are smooth and effective, [and] she has noticeably become more empathetic as a performer." Bubbles Salvador of PEP commended the on-screen chemistry of Gonzaga and Pascual, and praised the former's comedic performance. It was commercially successful, grossing ₱579 million (US$13 million) and becoming one of the highest-grossing Philippine films of all time. Among numerous accolades, Gonzaga was named Best Actress at the 2015 FAMAS Awards, and was named the Box Office Queen at the 2015 Box Office Entertainment Awards. The following year, she starred alongside Coco Martin in Antoinette Jadaone's You're My Boss, with Gonzaga playing an airline executive.

=== 2016–present: Comedies and reality television ===
Gonzaga's only television of project of 2016 was serving as a judge on the reality competition show I Love OPM. Her planned reunion with Pascual in the drama series Written In Our Stars was cancelled due to Gonzaga's pregnancy. She returned to reality television as a host of The Voice Teens, a spin-off of The Voice of the Philippines. Gonzaga produced and co-starred along her sister Alex in Mary, Marry Me, which premiered at the 2018 Metro Manila Film Festival. From 2018 to 2019, she hosted two reality shows: the sixth season of Pilipinas Got Talent, an adaptation of the British Got Talent franchise, and the fourth season of The Voice spin-off The Voice Kids.

In February 2022, Gonzaga left Pinoy Big Brother. She starred and wrote the screenplay for the film My Teacher, for which she was nominated for Best Actress and Best Screenplay at the Metro Manila Film Festival Awards. She next played the lead role in My Sassy Girl, based on the 2001 South Korean film.

== Music career ==
Gonzaga has released eight studio albums throughout her career. She released her first studio album, Toni Gonzaga (2002), under Prime Records, but was a commercial failure. Her next studio album, You Complete Me (2006), was released under Star Records, and it contained the lead single "We Belong", written by Christian Martinez. Other songs from the album include "Kung Kaya Ko" (transl. When I Can), written by Gonzaga herself, and a cover of Donna Cruz's "Kapag Tumibok Ang Puso" (transl. When My Heart is Beating). Her second studio album, Falling in Love (2007), saw Gonzaga work with composer Jonathan Manalo; Manalo composed the single "Catch Me I'm Fallin'". Her cover of Jamie Rivera's "I've Fallen for You" served as the theme song of the 2007 film I've Fallen for You. Another track, "Kasalanan Ko Ba?", is a cover of the Neocolours song. Gonzaga said that "[the] album is really a compilation that talks about my emotions, me being in love." The next album, Love Is (2008), was supported by Gonzaga's cover of Randy Crawford's "One Hello". Gonzaga also recorded the theme song for My Only Ü, a cover of the Supremes' "You Can't Hurry Love". Gonzaga then released a collaboration album with Sam Milby, titled Love Duets (2009).

Her next studio album, All Me, was released in August 2010 in the Philippines and several other Asian countries. Celestine (2014) saw Gonzaga wrote multiple singles. She said, "The songs in my album are more personal and closer to my heart. It shows who I really am as a singer [and] an artist." She and Jonathan Manalo co-wrote the original track "This Love is Like". Gonzaga wrote another single, "Awit ni Ginny", which is inspired by her character in Starting Over Again. At the 2015 Star Awards for Music, Celestine was named Album of the Year. She released another album, My Love Story, in 2015. Gonzaga selected the songs that reflect her relationship and marriage to director Paul Soriano.

== Personal life ==
In July 2007, Gonzaga announced her relationship with director Paul Soriano. Gonzaga publicly announced their engagement in February 2015, and on June 12, they were married in Taytay. They have two children: a son, born in September 2016, and a daughter, born in August 2023.

On February 8, 2022, Gonzaga hosted the UniTeam alliance's proclamation rally at the Philippine Arena and endorsed former senator Bongbong Marcos in the 2022 presidential elections. Her endorsement attracted widespread media attention, as well as mixed responses from colleagues in the entertainment industry.

== Acting credits and awards ==
Gonzaga has appeared in numerous film and television productions, primarily in romantic comedies and drama, throughout her career spanning over two decades. According to the online portal Box Office Mojo, Gonzaga's most commercially successful films include You Are the One (2006), My Amnesia Girl (2010), This Guy's in Love with U Mare! (2012), Four Sisters and a Wedding (2013), Starting Over Again (2014) and You're My Boss (2015). As of 2024, her films have collectively grossed over ₱2.12 billion globally making her one of the highest-grossing Filipino actors of all time.

Gonzaga has been a recipient of eleven Box Office Entertainment Awards: Box Office Queen in 2015, three times as Princess of Philippine Movies, three times as Best Female TV Host and Female Concert Performer of the Year in 2012. She first gained recognition as an actress when she received a nomination for the Star Award for Best Comedy Actress for her performance in the sitcom Lagot Ka... Isusumbong Kita! (2003). Her increasing profile through her film and musical work have earned her the Box Office Entertainment Award for Most Promising Female Star in 2006. She was inducted into the Aliw Awards hall of fame in 2015 for winning three times in the category Best Female Emcee (2007, 2013 & 2014).

Gonzaga has been nominated for the FAMAS Award for Best Actress three consecutive times (2014 to 2016), winning one for her performance in the romantic drama Starting Over Again. For her musical work, her fifth and sixth studio albums, All Me and Celestine, have earned her the Star Awards for Music for Female Pop Artist of the Year in 2011 and Album of the Year in 2015, respectively. As a presenter, Gonzaga has won thirteen Star Awards for Television: five times as Best Female TV Host, three times as Best Female Showbiz-Oriented Talk Show Host, three times as Best Reality Show Host and twice as Best Talent Search Program Host.

== Discography ==
=== Studio albums ===
Year	Album title	Sales	Details	Certification	Ref.
2002	Toni Gonzaga	—N/a	Released Date: July 26, 2002; Recording Label: Prime Music	—N/a	
2006	Toni: You Complete Me	PHL Sales: 25,000	Released Date: August 26, 2006; Recording Label: Star Music	PARI: Gold	
2007	Falling in Love	PHL sales: 40,000	Released Date: June 18, 2007; Recording Label: Star Music	PARI: Platinum	
2008	Love Is...	PHL sales: 25,000	Released Date: July 1, 2008; Recording Label: Star Music	PARI: Gold	
2009	Love Duets	PHL sales: 12,000	Artists: Toni Gonzaga & Sam Milby; Released Date: February 20, 2009; Recording Label: Star Music	PARI:Gold	
2010	All Me	PHL sales: 17,000	Released Date: July 16, 2010; Recording Label: Star Music & The Orchard	PARI: Gold	
2014	Celestine	PHL sales: 18,000	Released Date: May 20, 2014; Produced By: Jonathan Manalo; Recording Label: Star Music	PARI: Gold	
2015	My Love Story	PHL sales: 7,000	Released Date: October 17, 2015; Produced By: Jonathan Manalo; Recording Label: Star Music	—N/a	

=== Compilation albums ===
Release date	Album title	Sales	Recording label	Certification	Ref.
September 30, 2011	Greatest Hits	PHL sales: 10,000+	Star Music	—N/a	

=== Participated albums ===
Year	Song title	Album	Details	Certification	Ref.
2006	"Annie Batungbakal"	Hotsilog	Released Date: October 8, 2006; Recording Label: ASAP Music	PARI: Platinum	
2007	"Super Pinoy"	Nagmamahal, Kapamilya: Songs for Global Pinoys	Released Date: July 25, 2007; Recording Label: Star Music	PARI: 6× Platinum	
2007	"Count On Me"	Healing Of Pain and Enlightenment	Released Date: December 2007; Recording Label: Star Music	PARI: Gold	
2009	"Can't Hurry Love"	OPM Number 1's	Released Date: April 2009; Recording Label: Star Music	—N/a	
2009	"Power of the Dream" "Bagong Umaga"	I Move, I Give, I Love	Released Date: June 24, 2009; Recording Label: Star Music	PARI: Gold	
2010	"Crazy For You"	60 Taon ng Musika at Soap Opera	Released Date: June 2010; Recording Label: Star Music	—N/a	
2010	"Ganyan ang Pasko" "Ngayong Pasko Magniningning ang Pilipino"	Ngayong Pasko Magniningning ang Pilipino	Artists: with Gary Valenciano; Released Date: November 2010; Recording Label: Star Music	—N/a	
2011	"All Me (Remix)"	OPM Number 1's Vol. 2	Released Date: January 2011; Recording Label: Star Music	—N/a	
2011	"Catch Me I'm Falling"	I Love You	Released Date: February 2011; Recording Label: Star Music	—N/a	
2011	"God Bless the Broken Road"	Kris Aquino: My Heart's Journey	Released Date: March 5, 2011; Recording Label: Universal Records	PARI: Platinum	
2011	"Mahal Kita Kasi" "Catch Me I'm Falling", "You Are The One"	Bida Best Hits Da Best	Artists: with Sam Milby; Released Date: June 2011; Recording Label: Star Music	—N/a	
2011	"Mahalin Ka Ng Totoo"	Happy Yipee Yehey! Nananana!	Released Date: November 12, 2011; Recording Label: Star Music	PARI: Gold	
2011	"Ganyan ang Pasko" "Ngayong Pasko Magniningning ang Pilipino"	Da Best ang Pasko ng Pilipino	Artists: with Gary Valenciano; Released Date: November 18, 2011; Recording Label: Star Music	—N/a	
2013	"Kahit Na"	Himig Handog P-Pop Love Songs (2013)	Released Date: January 17, 2013; Recording Label: Star Music	—N/a	

== Concerts ==
Year	Title	Details	Notes	Ref.
2008	Catch Me, Toni Gonzaga: First Major Concert	Date: February 9, 2008; Venue: Aliw Theater	First Major Concert	
2008	Catch Me, Toni Gonzaga: The Repeat Concert	Date: May 2, 2008; Venue: Aliw Theater		
2009	Toni Gonzaga Level-Up Philippine Tour	Date: August 21, 2009; Venue: Limketkai Atrium, Cagayan de Oro		
2009	Toni Gonzaga Level-Up Philippine Tour	Date: September 18, 2009; Venue: La Salle Coliseum, Bacolod City		
2009	Toni Gonzaga Level-Up Philippine Tour	Date: October 16, 2009; Venue: Holy Cross Gym, Davao City		
2009	Toni Gonzaga Level-Up Philippine Tour	Date: October 30, 2009; Venue: Cebu Coliseum, Cebu City		
2010	Love is... Toni Gonzaga	Date: February 26 & 27, 2010; Venue: Music Museum		
2011	Toni @ 10: The Anniversary Concert	Date: September 30, 2011; Venue: Smart Araneta Coliseum		
2014	Toni Gonzaga: Celestine	Date: October 3, 2014; Venue: Mall Of Asia Arena		
2014	Toni Gonzaga: Celestine	Date January 16, 2015; Venue: WaterFront Cebu City Hotel		
2015	"OMG (Oh My Gonzaga)"	Date: March 5, 2015; Venue: IPI Arena Al Jazira Club, Abu Dhabi, UAE		
2015	Toni & Alex Gonzaga: Live Down Under Tour	Date: April 10, 2015; Venue: Blacktown Workers Club, Sydney, Australia		
2015	Toni & Alex Gonzaga: Live Down Under Tour	Date April 11, 2015; Venue: Mounties Club, Mt. Prichard, Sydney, Australia		
2023	"I AM... TONI: 20th Anniversary Concert"	Date: January 20, 2023; Venue: Smart Araneta Coliseum		
