= My Amnesia Girl =

2010 romantic comedy film by Cathy Garcia-Molina

- Theatrical movie poster
- Directed by: Cathy Garcia-Molina
- Screenplay by: Carmi Raymundo; Juan Miguel Sevilla; Jade Francis Castro
- Story by: Jade Francis Castro
- Produced by: Charo Santos-Concio; Malou N. Santos
- Starring: John Lloyd Cruz; Toni Gonzaga
- Cinematography: Noel Teehankee
- Edited by: Marya Ignacio
- Music by: Cesar Francis S. Concio
- Production company: Star Cinema
- Distributed by: ABS-CBN Film Productions
- Release date: November 24, 2010
- Running time: 106 minutes
- Country: Philippines
- Language: Filipino
- Box office: ₱164 million

My Amnesia Girl is a 2010 Filipino romantic comedy film directed by Cathy Garcia-Molina and written by Jade Francis Castro, Juan Miguel Sevilla, and Carmi G. Raymundo from Castro's story concept. The film stars John Lloyd Cruz and Toni Gonzaga in the lead roles while the supporting cast includes Carlos Agassi, Joross Gamboa, Ketchup Eusebio, and JM de Guzman.

Produced and distributed by Star Cinema, the film was theatrically released on November 24, 2010. With a total of ₱164 million in the box office, it is the highest-grossing Filipino film of 2010.

== Plot ==
When Glen Apollo (John Lloyd Cruz) finds himself surrounded by friends who are beginning to settle down, he is faced with the possibility of finding his true love. It all boils down to one name: Irene. It must be fate then, when he once again sees Irene (Toni Gonzaga), his ex-girlfriend from 3 years ago, with whom he had the best memories. Apollo and Irene were a perfect couple and were engaged to be married. It all ended at the altar when Apollo had a bout of cold feet and left Irene alone in the aisle.

Now, Irene has no recollection of Apollo, having acquired “amnesia” shortly after their separation. Apollo sees this as the perfect opportunity to pursue Irene again and be able to undo all the mistakes he made in the past by offering Irene the best memories she could ever have.

They learn that true love is difficult to resist. Just when they find themselves ready to commit to each other, the pains from the past catch up with them, challenging them to finally own up to the mistakes made and lies said, and eventually realize what it is to forgive and forget.

== Cast ==
=== Main cast ===
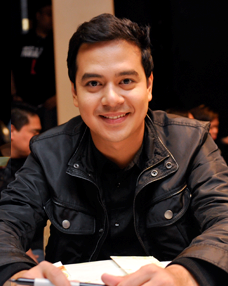
John Lloyd Cruz portrays Apollo/Pol.

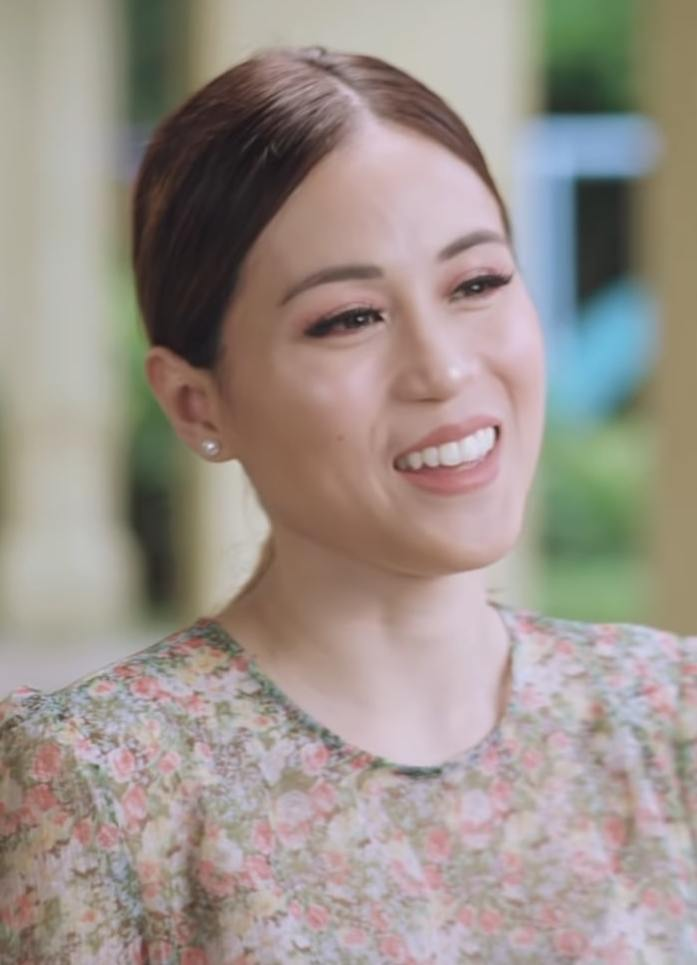
Toni Gonzaga portrays Irene

- John Lloyd Cruz as Apollo / Pol
- Toni Gonzaga as Irene

=== Supporting cast ===
- Beatriz Saw as Peachy
- Joross Gamboa as Jan
- Carlos Agassi as Ken
- JM De Guzman as Eric
- Ketchup Eusebio as Chibu
- Atoy Co as Tatay Diego
- Dianne Medina as Jen
- Nico Antonio as Poch
- Cai Cortez as Maia

=== With special participation ===
- Angel Locsin as MMA Fighter
- Kaye Abad as Teacher
- Denise Laurel as Perfectionist
- Jodi Sta. Maria as Flight Attendant

== Reception ==
The film was well-received by the critics and became commercially successful. It is considered the highest-grossing film of 2010, having a total gross of P164 million pesos nationwide. Cruz and Gonzaga were respectively named as the "Box-Office King and Queen" of 2010, by SM Cinemas.

== Awards ==
Year	Award-Giving Body	Category	Recipient	Result
2011	GMMSF Box-Office Entertainment Awards	Princess of Philippine Movies	Toni Gonzaga	Won
