= Falling in Love (Toni Gonzaga album) =

Studio album by Toni Gonzaga
- Released: June 18, 2007
- Recorded: Pink Noise, Quezon City
- Genre: Pop, adult contemporary, OPM
- Length: 0:49:24
- Language: Filipino, English, Tagalog
- Label: Star Recording, Inc.
- Producer: Malou N. Santos (executive); Annabelle R. Borja (executive); Christian Martinez

Toni Gonzaga chronology
Toni: You Complete Me (2006)	Falling in Love (2007)	Love Is... (2008)

Singles from Falling in Love
- 1. "Catch Me, I'm Fallin'" Released: June 17, 2007; 2. "Kasalanan Ko Ba" Released: August 27, 2007; 3. "Perfect World" Released: September 19, 2007; 4. "I've Fallen for You" Released: September 26, 2007

Falling in Love is the third studio album of Filipino TV host, actress-singer Toni Gonzaga and her second on Star Records, released on June 18, 2007, in the Philippines in CD format and digital download. The carrier single released is "Catch Me, I'm Fallin'" accompanied with music video directed by Paul Soriano.

== Background ==
The album features a collection of eleven original compositions within the Original Pilipino Music (OPM) genre, produced by Christian Martinez. The album also includes two cover songs: "Kasalanan Ko Ba," originally performed by Neocolours, and "I've Fallen for You," a Jamie Rivera original. This release marks her second studio album under Star Records. Initially scheduled for a May 2007 release, the album's launch was postponed to June 18, 2007, following an incident that occurred during the filming of her "Enervon" television advertisement. The album also includes her own composition "You're My Right Kind of Wrong". The album has been awarded platinum certification by the Philippine Association of the Record Industry (PARI).

The album's lead single, "Catch Me, I'm Fallin'", debuted in June 2007, and served as the theme song for the Korean drama series, Which Star Are You From?, which aired on ABS-CBN network's Primetime Bida lineup in 2007.

== Track listing ==
No.	Title	Writer(s)	Arranger(s)	Length
1.	"Catch Me, I'm Falling"	Christian Martinez	Dominic Benedicto	04:38
2.	"Kasalanan Ko Ba?"	Jimmy Antiporda	Albert Tamayo	04:09
3.	"Perfect World"	Christian Martinez	Albert Tamayo	03:13
4.	"I've Fallen for You"	Jay-Donna Montelibano-McLoed	Dominic Benedicto	04:15
5.	"What Are the Chances?"	Albert Tamayo	Jude Gitamondoc	03:50
6.	"Can't We Try?"	Popsie Saturno (lyrics), Vehnee Saturno (music)	Arnold Buena	04:05
7.	"Stay with Me"	Raymund Ryan Santes	Ferdie Marquez	03:58
8.	"Crazy Little Thing Called Love"	Christian Martinez		03:23
9.	"Power of the Dream"	Jonathan Manalo	Paulo Zarate	04:47
10.	"You're My Right Kind of Wrong"	Toni Gonzaga	Dominic Benedicto	04:36
11.	"I'll Never Let You Go"	Nonong Pedero	Albert Tamayo	04:04

- track 2 “Kasalanan Ko Ba” is a remake of an original song by the Neocolours.
- track 3 “Perfect World” is the carrier track of Level Up Games' online game Perfect World.
- track 4 “I've Fallen for You” is a remake of an original song by Jamie Rivera and was featured in the Star Cinema film of the same name starring Gerald Anderson and Kim Chiu.
- track 11 "I'll Never Let You Go is a remake of an original song by JoAnne Lorenzana.

== Personnel ==
Credits taken from Titik Pilipino

- Malou N. Santos – executive producer
- Annabelle R. Borja – executive producer
- Christian Martinez – producer
- Nixon Sy – marketing unit head
- Raffy P. Sunico – project assistant
- Monina B. Quejano – A&R coordination
- Beth Faustino – publishing coordinator
- Grace S. Torres – album concept & design
- Mer2 Ocate – additional design
- Andrew S. Castillo – art direction
- Xander Angeles – photography
- Edwin Tan – stylist
- Krist Bansuelo – hair & make-up

== Certifications ==
Country	Provider	Certification	Sales
Philippines	PARI	Platinum	PHL sales: 40,000+
