= Lagot Ka... Isusumbong Kita! =

Philippine television sitcom series

- Title card
- Genre: Sitcom
- Written by: Denoy Navarro-Punio
- Directed by: Boyong Baytion
- Starring: Joey Marquez; Benjie Paras; Richard Gomez; Raymart Santiago
- Opening theme: "Lagot Ka!" by Mike Hanopol and Masculados
- Country of origin: Philippines
- Original language: Tagalog
- No. of episodes: 182

Production
- Executive producer: Jaydine Valencia
- Camera setup: Multiple-camera setup
- Running time: 45 minutes
- Production company: GMA Entertainment TV

Original release
- Network: GMA Network
- Release: October 20, 2003 – April 9, 2007

Lagot Ka... Isusumbong Kita! (transl. you're busted... I will tell!; subtitled Yahoong-Yahoo!) is a Philippine television sitcom series broadcast by GMA Network. Starring Joey Marquez, Benjie Paras, Richard Gomez, and Raymart Santiago, it premiered on October 20, 2003 on the network's KiliTV line up. The series concluded on April 9, 2007, with a total of 182 episodes.

The series is streaming online on YouTube.

== Cast and characters ==
Cast

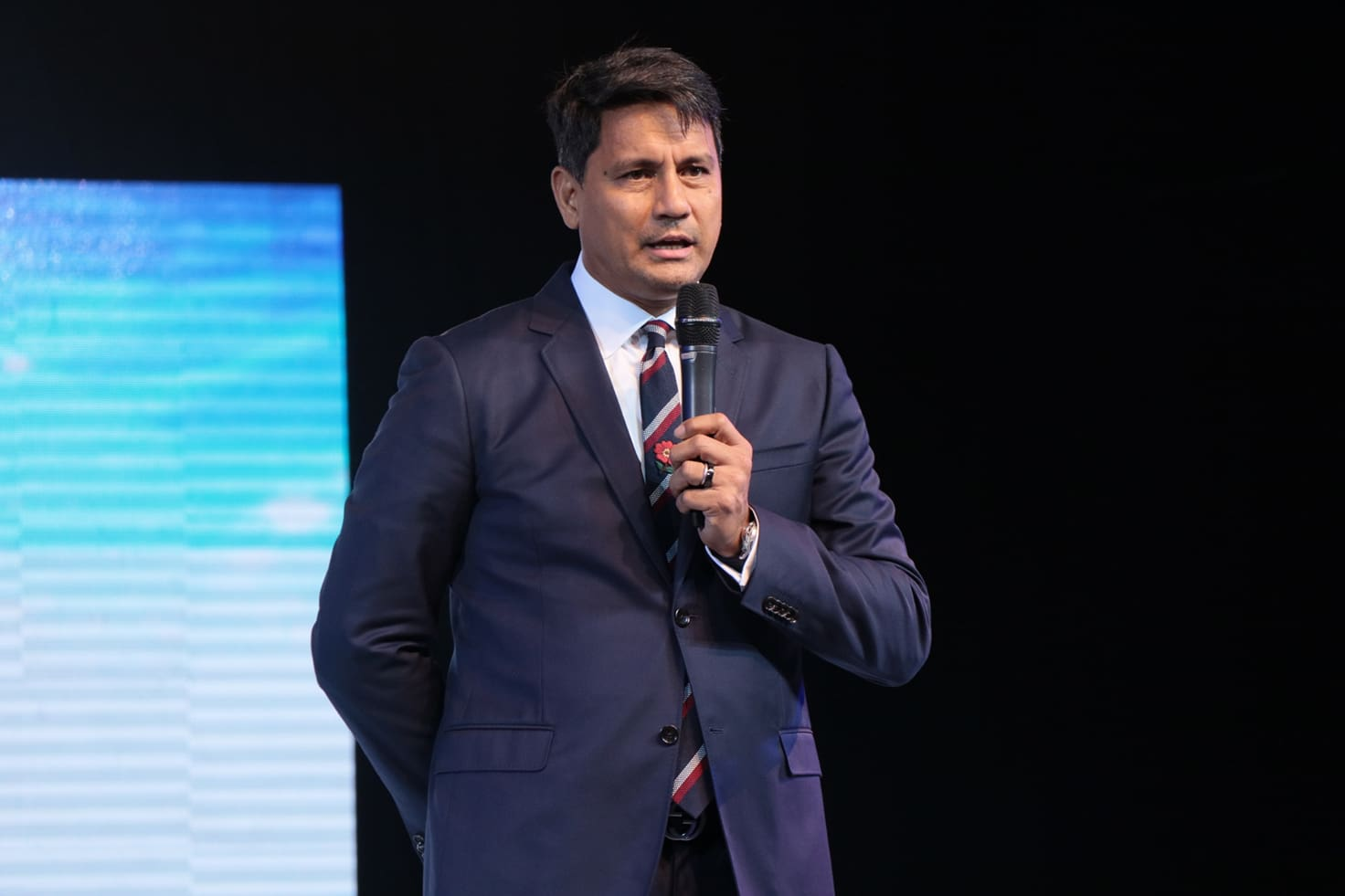
Richard Gomez

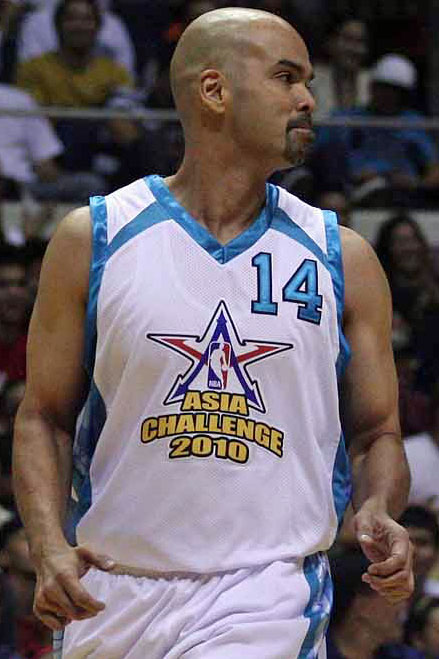
Benjie Paras

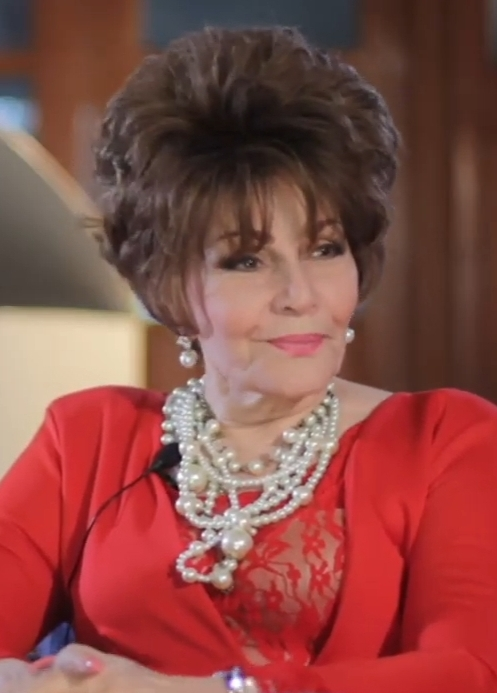
Pilita Corrales

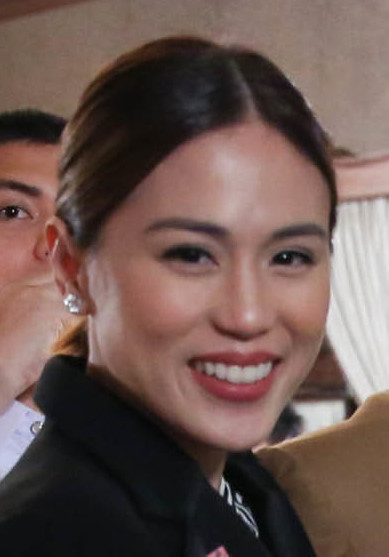
Toni Gonzaga

Lead cast

- Richard Gomez as Ric
- Joey Marquez as Tsong
- Benjie Paras as Junior
- Raymart Santiago as Toto

Supporting cast

- Pilita Corrales as Rosa / Mamita
- Maureen Larrazabal as Tisay
- Alicia Mayer as Sussy
- Bearwin Meily as Tom
- Toni Gonzaga as Toni
- Nancy Castiglione as Trisha
- Teri Onor as Romeo
- Vangie Labalan as Tusha
- Alyssa Alano as Shirley
- Gladys Guevarra as Lyn Chin
- Cogie Domingo as Kiko

== Accolades ==
Accolades received by Lagot Ka... Isusumbong Kita!
Year	Award	Category	Recipient	Result	Ref.
2005	Golden Screen TV Awards	Outstanding Comedy Series	Lagot Ka... Isusumbong Kita!	Nominated	
2005	Golden Screen TV Awards	Outstanding Director for a Comedy Series/Comedy Gag Show	Boyong Baytion	Nominated	
2005	Golden Screen TV Awards	Outstanding Lead Actor in a Comedy Series	Joey Marquez	Nominated	
2005	Golden Screen TV Awards	Outstanding Lead Actor in a Comedy Series	Benjie Paras	Nominated	
2005	Golden Screen TV Awards	Outstanding Lead Actor in a Comedy Series	Raymart Santiago	Nominated	
2005	Golden Screen TV Awards	Outstanding Lead Actress in a Comedy Series	Pilita Corrales	Nominated	
2005	Golden Screen TV Awards	Outstanding Supporting Actor in a Comedy Series	Bearwin Meily	Nominated	
2005	Golden Screen TV Awards	Outstanding Supporting Actor in a Comedy Series	Teri Onor	Nominated	
