= All Me (album) =

Studio album by Toni Gonzaga
- Released: July 16, 2010
- Recorded: 2009–2010
- Genres: Pop, OPM
- Length: CD, 42:39, VCD, 17:54
- Language: English
- Label: Star Recording, Inc.
- Producers: Malou N. Santos (executive); Annabelle R. Borja (executive); Jonathan Manalo (over-all producer)

Toni Gonzaga chronology
Love Duets (with Sam Milby) (2009)	All Me (2010)	Greatest Hits (2011)

Singles from All Me
- 1. "All Me" Released: July 2010; 2. "Can't Help Myself" Released: August 2010; 3. "I Love You So" Released: November 2010; 4. "Only With You" Released: January 2011; 5. "Say You Love Me" Released: February 2011

All Me is the fifth studio album by Filipino TV host actress-singer Toni Gonzaga and her fourth on Star Records, released on July 16, 2010, in the Philippines in CD and VCD formats and digital download. The carrier single released is "All Me" accompanied with a music video directed by Paul Soriano. This is the first ever album magazine that include picture and article about herself. The album was targeted and released in other Asian countries such as Malaysia, Singapore, Indonesia, Thailand, Korea, Japan, Taiwan and Hong Kong.

== Background ==
All Me contains 13 tracks of original OPM composition produced by Jonathan Manalo and 5 music videos whose directed by Paul Soriano. It is Toni's fifth album under Star Records and was released on July 16, 2010. Gonzaga also revealed that she gave her ideas in creating the album "Marami [akong contribution] kasi itong album na ito is a collaboration and teamwork talaga ng Star Records and me. I am thankful na hinihingan ako ng suggestions and opinions ng Star Records for the album.". She included her collaborated composition with Jonathan Manalo and entitled, You Make Me Feel.

The launching of the album was held at the noon-time variety show ASAP XV and performed All Me and Can't Help Myself together with Nikki Gil and Karylle.

== Singles ==
All Me was the lead single of the album. Can't Help Myself was the second single released from the album.

I Love You So was released in the 4th quarter of 2010 and served as the third single, replacing Only With You. The song was used as the theme song of Chinese series, I Love You So (Autumn Concerto). This single received heavy rotation of airplay both on radios and television.

Both Only With You and Say You Love Me were released as the 4th and final singles from the album but failed to enter any charts on radios and television.

== Chart performance ==
In November 2011 the album sells 7,500+ and awarded gold certified by Philippine Association of the Record Industry (PARI) during the ASAP 24k Awards. In July 2012 the album sold 13,000 copies. As of August 2018, it sold 17,000 units in the Philippines.

== Track listing ==
Disc 1

No.	Title	Writer(s)	Arranger(s)	Length
1.	"Can't Help Myself"	Jimmy Antiporda	Jimmy Antiporda	3:24
2.	"Only With You - Radio Edit"	Rox B. Santos	Arnold Jallores	3:07
3.	"Love Me Interlude"			0:13
4.	"Say You Love Me"	Marlon Silva	Arnold Jallores	3:25
5.	"It Had To Be You"	Christian Martinez	Dominic Benedicto	3:51
6.	"Autumn Love Interlude"			1:02
7.	"I Love You So"	Jonathan Manalo	Arnold Jallores	3:53
8.	"No Greater Love"	Chris Eaton/Margaret Becker	Arnold Buena	4:09
9.	"You Make Me Feel"	Jonathan Manalo/Toni Gonzaga	Arnold Jallores	4:31
10.	"All Me"	Jonathan Manalo	Brian Chua/Arnold Buena	3:59
11.	"Say You Love Me (Remix) featuring JM"	Marlon Silva	Arnold Jallores	3:25
12.	"Come Back To Me - Duet with Hazami"	Hazami	Arnold Buena	4:26
13.	"Only With You - Full Edit"	Rox B. Santos	Arnold Jallores	3:10
Total length:				42:39

Disc 2 (VCD) - Director Paul Soriano, Photography director Anne Monson

No.	Title	Length
1.	"All Me"	3:59
2.	"Can't Help Myself"	3:24
3.	"Only With You"	3:11
4.	"I Love You So"	3:53
5.	"Say You Love Me"	3:25
Total length:		17:54

- track 7 - "I Love You So" was used as the theme song of the Taiwanese series, Autumn's Concerto, starring Vaness Wu and Ady An when it was shown in the Philippines.

== Personnel ==
Credits taken from Titik Pilipino

- Malou N. Santos – executive producer
- Annabelle R. Borja – executive producer
- Jonathan Manalo – all-over producer
- Rox B. Santos – associate album producer
- Roxy Liquigan – star adprom head
- Nixon Sy – star adprom head for audio
- Peewee Apostol – head, Star Songs, Inc.
- Beth Faustino – music copyright coordinator
- Patrick Kevin Cabreba IV – album design
- Doc Marlon Pecjo – photography
- Pam Quiones – stylist
- Krist Bansuelo – make-up
- Macy Dionisio – hair & make-up

== Music video personnel ==
- Producer/Director – Paul Soriano
- Concepts and Creative team – Paul Soriano/Toni Gonzaga/Mark Victor/Fabienne Bucher
- Photography Director – Anne Manson
- Production Manager – Erick Malaya
- Production Designer – Sheen Seckts
- Editors – Mark Victor/Fabienne Bucher
- Make-up Artist – Krist Bensuela
- Hair Dresser – Macy Dionisio
- Stylist – Pam Quinones

== Certifications ==
Country	Provider	Certification	Sales
Philippines	PARI	Gold	PHL sales: 17,000+
