= My Big Love =

- Theatrical film poster
- Directed by: Jade Castro
- Screenplay by: Michiko Yamamoto; Theodore Boborol
- Story by: Henry Quitain; Theresa de Guzman
- Produced by: Charo Santos-Concio; Malou N. Santos
- Starring: Toni Gonzaga; Sam Milby; Kristine Hermosa
- Cinematography: Ike Avellana
- Edited by: Mikael Pestaño
- Music by: Jessie Lasaten
- Production company: Star Cinema
- Distributed by: ABS-CBN Film Productions
- Release date: 27 February 2008
- Running time: 110 minutes
- Country: Philippines
- Language: Filipino
- Box office: ₱73 million

My Big Love is a 2008 Philippine romantic comedy film directed by Jade Castro and written by Michiko Yamamoto and Theodore Boborol from a story developed by Henry King Quitain and Theresa de Guzman. The film stars Sam Milby and Toni Gonzaga, together with Kristine Hermosa. This is the third film to feature Milby and Gonzaga after You Are the One (2006) and You Got Me! (2007).

== Plot ==
The story follows Macky, an obese pastry chef whose physical transformation from weight loss catches the attention of his dream girl, Niña, and his personal trainer, Aira, causing a love triangle to develop.

== Cast ==
- Toni Gonzaga as Aira Capistrano
- Sam Milby as Macky Cordova
- Kristine Hermosa as Niña
- Ricardo Cepeda as Bert
- Bugoy Cariño as Johnny Capistrano
- Sandy Andolong as Mama Bing Cordova
- Dick Israel as Chef Sen
- Lito Pimentel as Oca
- Malou de Guzman as Zeny Capistrano
- Janus Del Prado as Lito
- Marissa Sanchez as Honeylet
- Michelle Madrigal as Lyn
- Jaymee Joaquin as Gela
- Kian Kazemi as Pilo
- Aldred Gatchalian as A-Cap Capistrano
- Fred Payawan as Rene
