= You Are the One (film) =

- Theatrical film poster
- Directed by: Cathy Garcia-Molina
- Screenplay by: Raz dela Torre; Carmi Raymundo; Vanessa Valdez
- Story by: Raz dela Torre
- Produced by: Charo Santos-Concio; Malou N. Santos
- Starring: Toni Gonzaga; Sam Milby
- Cinematography: Eli G. Balce
- Edited by: Marya E. Ignacio
- Music by: Raul Mitra
- Production company: Star Cinema
- Release date: August 30, 2006
- Running time: 115 minutes
- Country: Philippines
- Language: Filipino

You Are the One is a 2006 Filipino romantic comedy film directed by Cathy Garcia-Molina and starring Sam Milby and Toni Gonzaga.

== Plot ==
Sally Malasmas (Gonzaga), a cheerful government employee, reluctantly processes her visa application to reunite with her family in the United States, as per her parents' wishes. While her family worries about her being lonely in the Philippines, Sally is content with her life surrounded by loyal friends and co-workers. However, during her visa interview, her application is unexpectedly denied by the handsome but dismissive Filipino American consul, Will Derby (Milby).

The day after denying Sally's visa application, Will wakes up from a one-night stand and, due to Manila's notorious traffic, misses work. He ends up at the Census Bureau where Sally works. Seizing a chance for revenge, Sally buries Will's inquiry form in a pile of paperwork, making him wait all day. When Will confronts her, she dismisses him, claiming his form is incomplete and must be processed the next day. Outraged, Will complains to Sally's supervisor, who sides with him, forcing Sally to stay late to help Will find the information he needs.

Will's cold and sullen demeanor stems from his agonizing search for his birth parents and any remaining family members in the Philippines, as well as the reason he was placed for adoption. Sympathizing with Will's plight, Sally decides to help him find the answers he seeks. Through this shared mission, they bond and grow closer.

Despite growing closer, Will and Sally have different views on their new-found friendship. Will's casual approach to relationships conflicts with Sally's traditional, old-fashioned values. To nurture their blossoming romance, they must navigate and overcome their cultural differences and ethnocentric beliefs. Unresolved issues could potentially hinder their relationship before it fully develops.

== Cast ==
=== Main cast ===
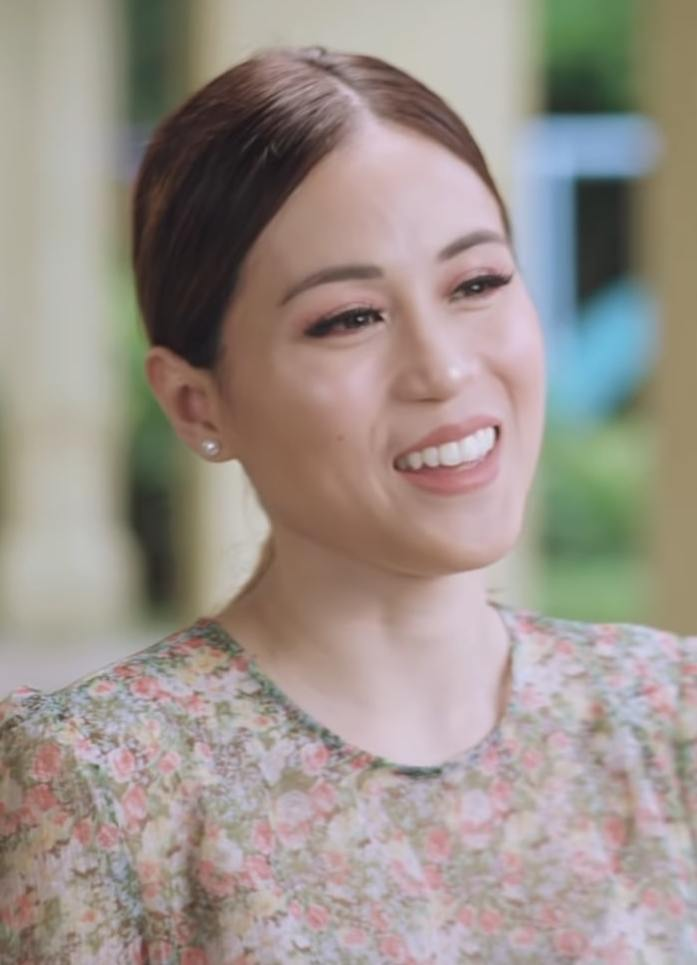
Toni Gonzaga portrays Sally Malasmas

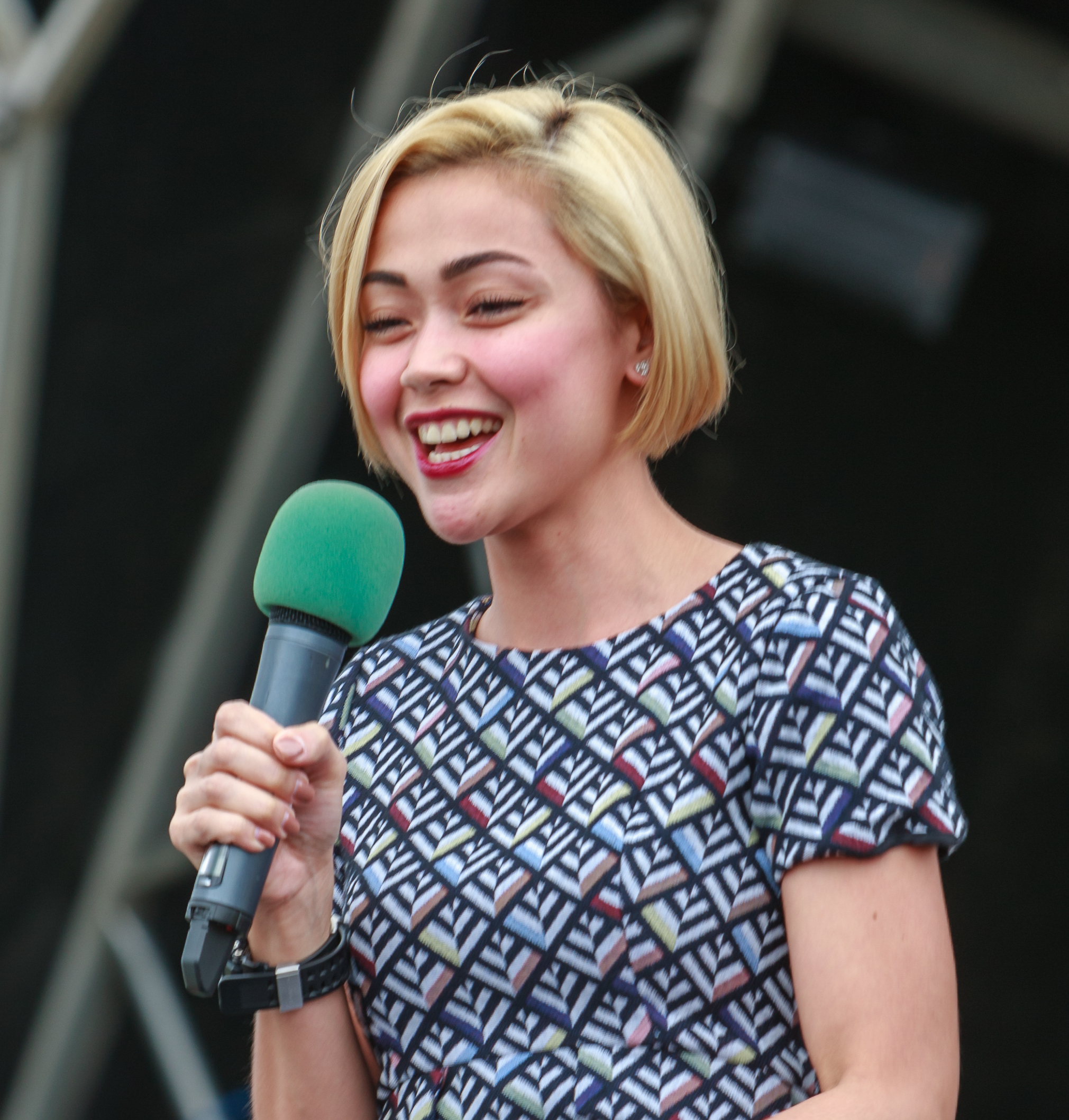
Jodi Sta. Maria portrays Chari Malasmas.

- Toni Gonzaga as Sally Malasmas
- Sam Milby as Will Derby / Vernard Garcia

=== Supporting cast ===
- Jodi Sta. Maria as Chari Malasmas
- Eugene Domingo as Dora
- Gio Alvarez as Melody
- Anita Linda
- Susan Africa as Sally and Chari's mother
- Lito Pimentel as Sally's boss
- Roldan Aquino
- Crispin Pineda
- Jao Mapa as Venjamin Garcia
- Arron Villaflor as Ryan
- Ahron Villena
- Rio Locsin as Myra Ramos-Garcia
- Albert Rabe

== Reception ==
The film grossed 100 million pesos. Philip Cu-Unjieng of the Philippine STAR describes the film as light entertainment. He notes the direction of Garcia-Molina and Gonzaga's performance. The review also takes note of Sta. Maria and Domingo as supporting cast.
