= List of films produced and released by Star Cinema =

This is the list of feature-length theatrical films produced and released by the Filipino motion picture company Star Cinema since its foundation in 1993.

== 1990s ==
=== 1993 ===
Title	Release date	Director	Cast	Genre(s)	Associated film production
Ronquillo: Tubong Cavite, Laking Tondo	May 12	Joey del Rosario	Bong Revilla, Ronaldo Valdez, Sheryl Cruz, Miguel Rodriguez	Action	Regal Entertainment
Home Along Da Riles	August 26	Johnny Manahan	Dolphy, Nova Villa, Vandolph, Claudine Barretto, Cita Astals, Bernardo Bernardo, Eddie Gutierrez, Smokey Manaloto, Gio Alvarez	Comedy	RVQ Productions
May Minamahal	December 25	Jose Javier Reyes	Aga Muhlach, Aiko Melendez	Romance, drama	

=== 1994 ===
Title	Release date	Director	Cast	Genre(s)	Associated film production
Minsan Lang Kita Iibigin	March 16	Chito S. Roño	Maricel Soriano, Gabby Concepcion, Zsa Zsa Padilla	Romance, drama	Moviestars Production
Hindi Pa Tapos ang Labada Darling	May 26	Tony Y. Reyes	Vic Sotto, Dina Bonnevie	Comedy	M-Zet Films
Maalaala Mo Kaya: The Movie	June 22	Olivia M. Lamasan	Richard Gomez, Aiko Melendez, Chin Chin Gutierrez	Biographical drama	
Iukit Mo sa Bala	September 14	Pepe Marcos	Ramon Revilla Jr., Gabby Concepcion, Nanette Medved	Action	MegaVision
Lagalag: The Eddie Fernandez Story	September 28	Romy Suzara	Rudy Fernandez, Dawn Zulueta, Rosa Rosal, Tirso Cruz III, Claudine Barretto, Gabby Concepcion	Action	MegaVision
Separada	October 12	Chito S. Roño	Maricel Soriano, Edu Manzano, Sharmaine Arnaiz, Patrick Garcia, Angelica Panganiban	drama	
Ang Ika-Labing Isang Utos: Mahalin Mo Asawa Mo	November 16	Marilou Diaz-Abaya	Aiko Melendez, Zsa Zsa Padilla, Maricel Laxa, Gabby Concepcion, Edu Manzano	Romance, drama	Regal Entertainment
Wanted: Perfect Father	December 25	Efren Jarlego	Dolphy, Dawn Zulueta, Edu Manzano, Babalu	Comedy, drama, Family	RVQ Productions

=== 1995 ===
Title	Release date	Director	Cast	Genre(s)	Associated film production
Pare Ko	January 11	Jose Javier Reyes	Mark Anthony Fernandez, Jomari Yllana, Claudine Barretto, Jao Mapa, Victor Neri, Gio Alvarez, Nikka Valencia	Drama, romance	
Eskapo	January 25	Chito S. Roño	Christopher De Leon, Dina Bonnevie, Richard Gomez, Ricky Davao, Mark Anthony Fernandez, Eric Fructuoso	Historical prison thriller	
Basta't Kasama Kita	February 1	Rory Quintos	Aga Muhlach, Dayanara Torres	Romance, drama	
Ipaglaban Mo: The Movie	March 29	Marilou Diaz-Abaya	Chin-Chin Gutierrez, Sharmaine Arnaiz	Crime, drama	
Bukas, Bibitayin si Itay – The Elmo Sandoval Story	May 10	Cesar S.B. Abella	John Regala, Sarah Jane Abad	Crime drama	El Niño Films
Sarah... Ang Munting Prinsesa	June 7	Romy Suzara	Camille Prats, Angelica Panganiban, Jean Garcia, Rio Locsin, Matt Ranillo III, Paula Peralejo, Kathleen Goquieng	Family	
Home Sic Home	June 21	Efren Jarlego	Dolphy, Dina Bonnevie	Comedy	RVQ Productions, Inc.
Patayin sa Sindak si Barbara	July 12	Chito S. Roño	Lorna Tolentino, Dawn Zulueta, Tonton Gutierrez, Antoinette Taus	Horror, thriller	
Sana Maulit Muli	August 9	Olivia Lamasan	Aga Muhlach, Lea Salonga	Drama, romance	
Asero	August 30	Joey Del Rosario	Cesar Montano, Ricky Davao, Gelli de Belen, Bembol Roco	Action, drama	
Hataw Na	September 13	Jose Javier Reyes	Gary Valenciano, Dayanara Torres, Nida Blanca, Roselle Nava, Jolina Magdangal, Lindsay Custodio, Jao Mapa	Musical, romance, drama	
Matimbang Pa sa Dugo	September 27	Jose Carreon	Rudy Fernandez, Mark Fernandez, Sharmaine Arnaiz	Action, drama	Reflection Films
Mangarap Ka	November 22	Rory Quintos	Mark Anthony Fernandez, Claudine Barretto, Kier Legaspi	Romance, sports, drama	

=== 1996 ===
Title	Release date	Director	Cast	Genre(s)	Associated film production
Oki Doki Doc	January 11	Efren Jarlego	Aga Muhlach, Babalu, Claudine Barretto, Agot Isidro, Carmina Villarroel, Jimmy Santos, Paolo Contis, Camille Prats	Comedy	
May Nagmamahal Sa'yo	January 25	Marilou Diaz-Abaya	Lorna Tolentino, Ariel Rivera, Claudine Barretto	Drama	
Radio Romance	February 14	Jose Javier Reyes	Gelli de Belen, Paolo Abrera, Robin Da Roza, Sharmaine Arnaiz, Noel Trinidad, John Estrada, Jolina Magdangal, Claudine Barretto, Rico Yan†	Drama, romance	
Ama, Ina, Anak	February 29	Jose Javier Reyes	Maricel Soriano, Edu Manzano, Boots Anson-Roa, Jackie Lou Blanco, Angelica Panganiban	Family drama	
Milyonaryong Mini	March 7	Tony Reyes	Anjo Yllana, Sheryl Cruz, John Estrada, Manilyn Reynes	Comedy, romance	
Sa Aking mga Kamay	March 21	Rory Quintos	Christopher De Leon, Aga Muhlach, Chin Chin Gutierrez	Psychological thriller	
Utol	April 24	Toto Natividad	Cesar Montano, Victor Neri, Alma Concepcion	Action, drama, crime	CM Films
Cedie	May 8	Romy Suzara	Tom Taus, Ronaldo Valdez, Jaclyn Jose, Mark Gil	Family	
Mula Noon Hanggang Ngayon	May 29	Khryss Adalia	Aiko Melendez, Chin Chin Gutierrez, Jomari Yllana, Gina Pareño	Drama, romance	
Isa, Dalawa, Takbo!	June 19	Edgar Mortiz	Anjo Yllana, Patrick Garcia	Comedy, horror	
Madrasta	August 14	Olivia Lamasan	Sharon Cuneta, Christopher de Leon, Zsa Zsa Padilla	Drama	
Mara Clara: The Movie	September 18	Jerry Lopez Sineneng	Judy Ann Santos, Gladys Reyes, Juan Rodrigo	Drama, Family	
Hangga't May Hininga	September 25	Toto Natividad	Phillip Salvador, Anjanette Abayari, Jackie Lou Blanco, Tirso Cruz III	Action, drama	
Ang TV the Movie: The Adarna Adventure	October 9	Johnny Manahan	Nida Blanca, Tirso Cruz III, Camille Prats, Angelica Panganiban, Jolina Magdangal, Gio Alvarez, Paolo Contis, Patrick Garcia Anna Larrucea	Fantasy, adventure, comedy	
Kung Kaya Mo, Kaya Ko Rin!	November 20	Danilo Cabreira	Maricel Soriano, Cesar Montano, Mark Gil	Action, comedy	CM Films
Magic Temple	December 25	Peque Gallaga, Lore Reyes	Jason Salcedo, Junell Hernando, Marc Solis, Anna Larrucea, Jackie Lou Blanco	Fantasy, adventure, comedy	

=== 1997 ===
Title	Release date	Director	Cast	Genre(s)	Associated film production
Tapang sa Tapang	January 1	Francis Posadas	Lito Lapid, Cynthia Luster, Jess Lapid Jr., Efren Reyes Jr.	Action	
Ang Pulubi at ang Prinsesa	January 10	Jerry Lopez Sineneng	Camille Prats, Angelica Panganiban, Sharmaine Arnaiz, Romnick Sarmenta, Teresa Loyzaga	Drama, comedy	
Iskalawag: Ang Batas Ay Batas	January 22	Francis Posadas	Raymart Santiago, Gelli de Belen, Victor Neri, Ronaldo Valdez, Bembol Roco, Dennis Roldan	Action	
Paano ang Puso Ko?	February 12	Rory Quintos	Judy Ann Santos, Wowie de Guzman, Rico Yan	Drama, romance	
Mariano Mison... NBI	February 26	Joey Del Rosario	Eddie Garcia, Elizabeth Oropesa, Ricky Davao	Action	
Lahar	March 12	Mel Chionglo	Tonton Gutierrez, Dawn Zulueta, Jaclyn Jose, Sharmaine Suarez, Tom Taus	Disaster	
I Do? I Die! (D'yos Ko Day!)	April 16	Efren Jarlego	Edu Manzano, Agot Isidro, Babalu, Paula Peralejo, Paolo Contis Redford White	Comedy	
Amanos, Patas ang Laban	April 23	Francis Posadas	Jestoni Alarcon, Sherilyn Reyes, Victor Neri	Action	
Batang PX	May 7	Jose Javier Reyes	Patrick Garcia, Zsa Zsa Padilla, Edu Manzano, Anna Larrucea	Drama	Available Light Production
Calvento Files: The Movie	May 14	Michael De Mesa, Laurenti Dyogi	Claudine Barretto, Rio Locsin, Diether Ocampo, Mylene Dizon Sharmaine Arnaiz, John Estrada, Cris Villanueva, Caridad Sanchez, Lorena Garcia	Anthology crime drama	
Home Along Da Riles 2	May 28	Efren Jarlego	Dolphy, Claudine Barretto, Nova Villa, Rico Yan, Vandolph	Comedy, family	RVQ Productions, Inc.
Wanted Perfect Murder	June 11	Boots Plata	Eric Quizon, Redford White, Camille Prats, Regine Tolentino, Bayani Agbayani	Comedy	
Flames: The Movie	July 9	Jerry Lopez Sineneng	Jolina Magdangal, Marvin Agustin, Bojo Molina, Rico Yan, Claudine Barretto	Romantic comedy	
Biyudo si Daddy, Biyuda si Mommy (She Loves Me... He Loves Me Too...)	July 23	Tony Reyes	Vic Sotto, Coney Reyes, Patrick Garcia, Sylvia La Torre, Oscar Obligacion	Comedy, family	M-Zet Films
Hanggang Kailan Kita Mamahalin?	August 13	Olivia Lamasan	Lorna Tolentino, Richard Gomez, Angelica Panganiban	Drama	
Goodbye America	August 20	Thierry Notz	Wolfgang Bodison, Corin Nemec, John Haymes Newton, Angel Aquino, Raymond Bagatsing, Alexis Arquette	Action, drama	Quantum Entertainment
Sabi Mo Mahal Mo Ako, Wala ng Bawian	September 10	Danilo Cabreira	Ramon Revilla Jr., Maricel Soriano, Allan K.	Action, romantic comedy	Imus Productions
Wala Ka Nang Puwang sa Mundo	October 22	Ronnie Ricketts	Ronnie Ricketts, Giselle Toengi, Chuck Perez	Action, drama	RS Productions
Ipaglaban Mo: The Movie II	November 5	Rory Quintos	Wowie de Guzman, Carmina Villarroel, Angelika Dela Cruz, Aljon Jimenez, Chat Silayan, Charito Solis	Crime, drama	
Ikaw Pala ang Mahal Ko	November 19	Jose Javier Reyes	Gelli de Belen, Ariel Rivera, Chin-Chin Gutierrez, Eula Valdez, John Lloyd Cruz, Ronaldo Valdez	Drama, romance	
Kokey	November 26	Romy Suzara	Carlo Aquino, Cherry Pie Picache, Ani Pearl Alonso, Ricky Davao	Comedy, family	

=== 1998 ===
Title	Release date	Director	Cast	Genre(s)	Associated film production
Haba-Baba-Doo! Puti-Puti-Poo!	January 14	Efren Jarlego	Babalu, Redford White, Princess Punzalan, Camille Prats, Stefano Mori	Comedy, Family	
Ang Lalaki sa Buhay ni Selya	February 11	Carlos Siguion-Reyna	Rosanna Roces, Ricky Davao, Gardo Versoza, Eva Darren	drama	Reyna Films
Kung Ayaw Mo, Huwag Mo!	February 25	Jerry Lopez Sineneng	Maricel Soriano, William Martinez, Jolina Magdangal, Marvin Agustin	Romantic comedy, drama	
Pagdating ng Panahon	March 11	Eric Quizon	Eric Quizon, Aiko Melendez	Drama, romance	
April, May, June	March 25	Manny Castaneda	Agot Isidro, Chin Chin Gutierrez, Alma Concepcion	Drama	
Muling Ibalik ang Tamis ng Pag-ibig	April 29	Boots Plata	Judy Ann Santos, Wowie de Guzman, Leo Martinez	Drama, romance	
Tong Tatlong Tatay Kong Pakitong-Kitong	May 13	Efren Jarlego	Babalu, Redford White, Bonel Balingit, Serena Dalrymple, Bernardo Bernardo	Comedy	
Birador	June 3	Edgardo Vinarao	Rudy Fernandez, Donita Rose, Victor Neri	Action, drama	
Nagbibinata	June 10	Jose Javier Reyes	Patrick Garcia, Paula Peralejo, Kristopher Peralta, Marc Solis, Kristine Hermosa, Baron Geisler, John Lloyd Cruz, Kaye Abad		
Dahil Mahal na Mahal Kita	June 24	Wenn V. Deramas	Claudine Barretto, Rico Yan†, Diether Ocampo	Drama, romance	
Ala Eh, Con Bisoy, Hale-Hale Hoy! (Laging Panalo ang Mga Unggoy!)	July 22	Efren Jarlego	Leo Martinez, Redford White, Paula Peralejo, Ronalisa Cheng	Comedy	
Labs Kita... Okey Ka Lang?	August 26	Jerry Lopez Sineneng	Jolina Magdangal, Marvin Agustin, Hilda Koronel	Comedy, romance	
Bata, Bata... Pa'no Ka Ginawa?/Lea's Story	September 9	Chito S. Roño	Vilma Santos, Ariel Rivera, Albert Martinez, Carlo Aquino, Serena Dalrymple	Drama, family	
Notoryus	September 30	Toto Natividad	Victor Neri, John Regala	Action	
Legacy	October 9	T.J. Scott	David Hasselhoff, Donita Rose, Rod Steiger, Corin Nemec, Victoria Pratt, Chin Chin Gutierrez, Michele Rogers	Action, thriller	Quantum Entertainment
Kay Tagal Kang Hinintay	October 14	Rory B. Quintos	Judy Ann Santos, Rico Yan†	Romance, drama	
Magandang Hatinggabi	November 4	Laurenti Dyogi	Marvin Agustin, Diether Ocampo, Angelika Dela Cruz, Jericho Rosales, Angelica Panganiban	Horror, suspense, thriller	
Hiling	November 18	Jose Javier Reyes	Camille Prats, Shaina Magdayao, Serena Dalrymple	Drama, fantasy	
Mystrio (Uno, Dos, Tres Pilyos)	December 2	Edgardo Vinarao	Paolo Contis, Kristopher Peralta, Carlos Agassi	Comedy, drama	
Puso ng Pasko	December 25	Peque Gallaga, Lore Reyes	Jolina Magdangal, Jason Salcedo, Jaclyn Jose, Rita Avila, Edu Manzano, Justin Simoy	Drama, fantasy	

=== 1999 ===
Title	Release date	Director	Cast	Genre(s)	Associated film production
Type Kita, Walang Kokontra	January 27	Toto Natividad	Cesar Montano, Dayanara Torres, Bayani Agbayani	Action, comedy, romance	CM Films
Mula sa Puso: The Movie	February 10	Wenn V. Deramas†	Claudine Barretto, Rico Yan†, Diether Ocampo, Princess Punzalan, Juan Rodrigo, Jaclyn Jose	Drama, romance	
Tik Tak Toys, My Kolokotoys	February 24	Efren Jarlego	Redford White, Carding Castro, Serena Dalrymple	Comedy	
Abel Villarama: Armado	April 14	Val Iglesias	Ace Vergel, Ina Raymundo, Tirso Cruz III, Bayani Agbayani	Action, crime	
Gimik: The Reunion	April 28	Laurenti Dyogi	Judy Ann Santos, Rico Yan†, Jolina Magdangal, Marvin Agustin, Giselle Toengi, Diether Ocampo, Mylene Dizon, Bojo Molina	Romance, family	
'Di Puwedeng Hindi Pwede!	May 12	Francis 'Jun' Posadas	Robin Padilla, Vina Morales, Bayani Agbayani	Action	CM Films; FLT Films International
Wansapanataym	May 26	Johnny Manahan	Christopher de Leon, Shaina Magdayao, Angel Aquino, Serena Dalrymple	Fantasy, drama	
Isusumbong Kita sa Tatay Ko...	June 9	Boots Plata	Fernando Poe Jr.†, Judy Ann Santos, Aileen Damiles	Action, comedy, drama	FPJ Productions
Tigasin	June 23	Ike Jarlego Jr.	Eddie Garcia, Victor Neri, Alma Concepcion	Action, comedy	
Isprikitik, Walastik Kung Pumitik	July 14	Efren Jarlego	Redford White†, Carding Castro†, Bonel Balingit	Comedy	
Soltera	July 28	Jerry Lopez Sineneng	Maricel Soriano, Claudine Barretto, Diether Ocampo	Romance, drama	
Alyas Pogi: Ang Pagbabalik	August 11	Joey Del Rosario	Ramon Revilla Jr., Ara Mina, Tonton Gutierrez, Efren Reyes Jr., Jeffrey Santos, Gerald Ejercito, Carlo Aquino,	Action, drama	Imus Productions
Hey Babe!	August 25	Joyce Bernal	Jolina Magdangal, Marvin Agustin, Alma Moreno, Gina Pareño, Nikki Valdez, Dominic Ochoa, Joey Marquez	Romantic comedy, drama	
Suspek	September 8	Toto Natividad	Victor Neri, Sharmaine Arnaiz, Emilio Garcia	Action, drama	
Oo Na, Mahal Na Kung Mahal	September 29	Johnny Manahan	John Lloyd Cruz, Marc Solis, Baron Geisler, Kaye Abad, Nikki Valdez, Kristine Hermosa	Comedy, drama	
Tar-San	October 13	Efren Jarlego	Redford White†, Carding Castro†, Bernadette Allyson	Comedy	
Weder-Weder Lang 'Yan	November 24	Boots Plata	Leo Martinez, Eric Quizon, John Estrada, Wowie de Guzman, Gladys Reyes	Comedy	
Esperanza: The Movie	December 25	Jerry Lopez Sineneng	Judy Ann Santos, Charo Santos-Concio, Wowie de Guzman, Dante Rivero, Angelika Dela Cruz, Piolo Pascual	Drama	

== 2000s ==
=== 2000 ===
Title	Release date	Director	Cast	Genre(s)	Associated film production
Minsan, Minahal Kita	February 23	Olivia Lamasan	Sharon Cuneta, Richard Gomez, Edu Manzano	Drama, romance	
Tunay na Tunay: Gets Mo? Gets Ko!	March 15	Joyce Bernal	Robin Padilla, Jolina Magdangal, Vic Diaz	Action, comedy, romance	RCP Productions
Anak	May 10	Rory Quintos	Vilma Santos, Claudine Barretto	Drama, family	
Daddy O, Baby O!	June 14	Eric Quizon	Dolphy, Serena Dalrymple, Angel Aquino	Drama, family, comedy	RVQ Productions, Inc.
Pera o Bayong (Not da TV)	July 26	Edgar Mortiz	Willie Revillame, Randy Santiago, John Estrada	Comedy	
Doomsdayer	September	Michael J. Sarna	Udo Kier, Joe Lara, Brigitte Nielsen, TJ Storm	Action	Quantum Entertainment
Kahit Isang Saglit	November 15	Gilbert Perez	Judy Ann Santos, Piolo Pascual, Leandro Muñoz	Romance, drama	
Ex-Con	December 13	Toto Natividad	Victor Neri, Rica Peralejo, Noel Trinidad	Action	
Tanging Yaman	December 25	Laurice Guillen	Gloria Romero, Hilda Koronel, Edu Manzano, Johnny Delgado	Drama, family	

=== 2001 ===
Title	Release date	Director	Cast	Genre(s)	Associated film production
Hostage	February 28	Augusto Salvador	Cesar Montano, Roi Vinzon, Bayani Agbayani	Action	CM Films
Ooops, Teka Lang... Diskarte Ko 'To!	March 14	Jose Carreon	Robin Padilla, Claudine Barretto, Vhong Navarro		FLT Films International
Narinig Mo Na Ba ang L8est?	April 25	Jose Javier Reyes	Aga Muhlach, Joyce Jimenez, Gloria Romero	Comedy, romance	Available Light Production
Mila	June 27	Joel Lamangan	Maricel Soriano, Piolo Pascual, Princess Punzalan, Cherry Pie Picache	Drama	
Bakit 'Di Totohanin	August 29	Boots Plata	Judy Ann Santos, Piolo Pascual, Jeffrey Quizon	Romance	
La Vida Rosa	September 26	Chito Roño	Rosanna Roces, Diether Ocampo, Liza Lorena, Jiro Manio	Crime, drama, romance	
Trip	November 7	Gilbert Perez	Marvin Agustin, Jericho Rosales, Kristine Hermosa, John Prats, Heart Evangelista, Paolo Contis, Onemig Bondoc, Desiree del Valle, Julia Clarete	Comedy, romance	
Bagong Buwan	December 25	Marilou Diaz-Abaya	Cesar Montano, Jericho Rosales, Amy Austria, Caridad Sanches, Carlo Aquino, Jiro Manio	Drama, historical	Bahaghari Productions; CM Films

=== 2002 ===
Title	Release date	Director	Cast	Genre(s)	Associated film production
American Adobo	January 16	Laurice Guillen	Cherry Pie Picache, Christopher de Leon, Dina Bonnevie, Ricky Davao, Paolo Montalban, Sandy Andolong	Comedy, drama	Unitel Pictures, Magic Adobo Productions, and Outrider Pictures
Kung Ikaw Ay Isang Panaginip	January 30	Wenn V. Deramas	Jolina Magdangal, Rafael Rosell, Leandro Munoz	Drama, fantasy, Family	
Got 2 Believe	February 27	Olivia Lamasan	Claudine Barretto, Rico Yan	Romance	
Videoke King	May 1	Jerry Lopez Sineneng	Robin Padilla, Pops Fernandez, Gabe Mercado	Action, comedy, drama	RCP Productions
Forevermore	June 26	John Lazatin	Jericho Rosales, Kristine Hermosa, Nestor de Villa	Romance	
Jologs	August 28	Gilbert Perez	Diether Ocampo, Patrick Garcia, Vhong Navarro, Assunta de Rossi, John Prats, Jodi Sta. Maria, Baron Geisler	Drama, comedy	
9 Mornings	October 16	Jose Javier Reyes	Piolo Pascual, Donita Rose, Dominic Ochoa	Romance	
Kailangan Kita	November 14	Rory Quintos	Claudine Barretto, Aga Muhlach	Romance, drama	
Dekada '70	December 25	Chito S. Roño	Vilma Santos, Christopher de Leon, Piolo Pascual, Marvin Agustin, Kris Aquino	Historical, drama	

=== 2003 ===
Title	Release date	Director	Cast	Genre(s)	Associated film production
Ngayong Nandito Ka	February 26	Jerry Lopez Sineneng	Kristine Hermosa, Jericho Rosales, Onemig Bondoc, Dianne dela Fuente	Romance, drama	
Till There Was You	April 30	Joyce E. Bernal	Judy Ann Santos, Piolo Pascual	Romance, drama	
Ang Tanging Ina	May 28	Wenn Deramas	Ai-Ai de las Alas, Marvin Agustin, Carlo Aquino, Nikki Valdez, Heart Evangelista, Eugene Domingo	Comedy	
Noon At Ngayon: Pagsasamang Kay Ganda	August 13	Marilou Diaz-Abaya	Dina Bonnevie, Eula Valdez, Jean Garcia, Cherry Pie Picache, Laurice Guillen	Drama	
Pinay Pie	September 3	Jose Javier Reyes	Joyce Jimenez, Assunta De Rossi, Ai Ai de las Alas, Carlos Agassi	Comedy	
Kung Ako na Lang Sana	September 24	Jose Javier Reyes	Sharon Cuneta, Aga Muhlach, Christine Bersola-Babao	Romance, comedy	
My First Romance	October 29	John Lazatin, Don Cuaresma	John Lloyd Cruz, Bea Alonzo, John Prats, Heart Evangelista	Romance	
Mr. Suave	November 19	Joyce Bernal	Vhong Navarro, Angelica Jones	Comedy	

=== 2004 ===
Title	Release date	Director	Cast	Genre(s)	Associated film production
Milan	February 11	Olivia Lamasan	Claudine Barretto, Piolo Pascual	Romance, drama	
Otso Otso Pamela-mela Wan	March 17	Jerry Lopez Sineneng	Vhong Navarro, Bayani Agbayani, Tessie Tomas	Comedy	
All My Life	May 26	Laurenti Dyogi	Aga Muhlach, Kristine Hermosa	Romance, drama	
Volta	June 23	Wenn V. Deramas	Ai-Ai de las Alas, Diether Ocampo, Jean Garcia	Action, adventure, comedy	
Now That I Have You	August 11	Laurenti Dyogi	John Lloyd Cruz, Bea Alonzo	Romance	
Feng Shui	September 15	Chito Roño	Kris Aquino, Jay Manalo, Lotlot de Leon, Cherry Pie Picache	Horror, suspense, thriller	K Productions
Bcuz Of U	November 17	John D Lazatin, Mae Czarina Cruz-Alviar, Cathy Garcia-Molina	Heart Evangelista, Sandara Park, Kristine Hermosa, Geoff Eigenmann, Hero Angeles, Diether Ocampo	Romance, comedy	

=== 2005 ===
Title	Release date	Director	Cast	Genre(s)	Associated film production
Dreamboy	February 9	Gilbert Perez	Piolo Pascual & Bea Alonzo	Romance	
Can This Be Love	April 27	Jose Javier Reyes	Sandara Park, Hero Angeles, Joross Gamboa, Roxanne Guinoo, Paw Diaz, Arron Villaflor	Romantic comedy	
Nasaan Ka Man	June 15	Cholo Laurel	Claudine Barretto, Jericho Rosales, Diether Ocampo	Romance, suspense, thriller	
D' Anothers	July 27	Joyce Bernal	Vhong Navarro, Toni Gonzaga, Pokwang, Roxanne Guinoo, Joross Gamboa, Jhong Hilario	Comedy, horror	
Dubai	September 28	Rory Quintos	Claudine Barretto, Aga Muhlach, John Lloyd Cruz	Romance, drama	

=== 2006 ===
Title	Release date	Director	Cast	Genre(s)	Associated film production
Don't Give Up On Us	January 8	Joyce Bernal	Judy Ann Santos, Piolo Pascual	Romance	
Close To You	February 15	Cathy Garcia-Molina	John Lloyd Cruz, Bea Alonzo, Sam Milby	Romance	
D' Lucky Ones	April 15	Wenn V. Deramas	Eugene Domingo, Pokwang, Sandara Park, Joseph Bitangcol	Comedy, romance	
All About Love	May 31	Joyce E. Bernal, Don Cuaresma, Jerry Lopez Sineneng	John Lloyd Cruz, Bea Alonzo, Anne Curtis, Luis Manzano, Angelica Panganiban, Jason Abalos	Romance, comedy	
Pacquiao: The Movie	June 21	Joel Lamangan	Jericho Rosales, Bea Alonzo	Action, drama	FLT Films International
Sukob	July 26	Chito S. Roño	Kris Aquino, Claudine Barretto	Horror, thriller, suspense	K Productions
You Are The One	August 30	Cathy Garcia-Molina	Toni Gonzaga, Sam Milby	Romance	
First Day High	September 20	Mario Cornejo	Geoff Eigenmann, Jason Abalos, Maja Salvador, Kim Chiu, Gerald Anderson	Comedy	
Wag Kang Lilingon	November 15	Jerry Lopez Sineneng, Quark Henares	Kristine Hermosa, Anne Curtis, Marvin Agustin	Horror	Viva Films
Kasal, Kasali, Kasalo	December 25	Jose Javier Reyes	Judy Ann Santos, Ryan Agoncillo	Romance, comedy	

=== 2007 ===
Title	Release date	Director	Cast	Genre(s)	Associated film production
Agent X44	January 17	Joyce Bernal	Vhong Navarro, Mariel Rodriguez, Pokwang, Mura	Comedy	
You Got Me	February 28	Cathy Garcia-Molina	Toni Gonzaga, Sam Milby, Zanjoe Marudo	Romance, comedy	USA Distributed by Metro-Goldwyn-Mayer, Orion Pictures and United International Pictures released June 15, 2007
Ang Cute ng Ina Mo	April 7	Wenn V. Deramas	Ai-Ai delas Alas, Anne Curtis, Luis Manzano, Eugene Domingo, DJ Durano, John Lapus	Comedy	Viva Films
Paano Kita Iibigin	May 30	Joyce Bernal	Piolo Pascual, Regine Velasquez, Mark Bautista, Iya Villania	Drama	Viva Films
A Love Story	August 15	Maryo J. de los Reyes	Aga Muhlach, Maricel Soriano, Angelica Panganiban	Drama, romance	
I've Fallen For You	September 26	Lino Cayetano	Kim Chiu, Gerald Anderson	Romance	
One More Chance	November 14	Cathy Garcia-Molina	John Lloyd Cruz & Bea Alonzo	Romance, drama	
Sakal, Sakali, Saklolo	December 25	Jose Javier Reyes	Judy Ann Santos, Ryan Agoncillo, Gina Pareño, Gloria Diaz	Romance, comedy	

=== 2008 ===
Title	Release date	Director	Cast	Genre(s)	Associated film production
My Big Love	February 27	Jade Castro	Toni Gonzaga, Sam Milby, Kristine Hermosa	Romance	
Supahpapalicious	March 22	Gilbert Perez	Vhong Navarro, Valerie Concepcion, Makisig Morales	Comedy	
When Love Begins	April 30	Jose Javier Reyes	Aga Muhlach, Anne Curtis	Romance, drama	Viva Films
Caregiver	May 28	Chito S. Roño	Sharon Cuneta, John Estrada, Rica Peralejo, John Manalo, Makisig Morales	Drama	
A Very Special Love	July 30	Cathy Garcia-Molina	Sarah Geronimo, John Lloyd Cruz	Romance, comedy	Viva Films
For the First Time	August 27	Joyce Bernal	Richard Gutierrez, KC Concepcion	Romance	
My Only Ü	October 29	Cathy Garcia-Molina	Toni Gonzaga, Vhong Navarro	Romantic black comedy	
Ang Tanging Ina N'yong Lahat	December 25	Wenn V. Deramas	Ai-Ai de las Alas, Eugene Domingo, Carlo Aquino, Alwyn Uytingco, Shaina Magdayao, Serena Dalrymple, Jiro Manio, Yuuki Kadooka, John Prats, Cherry Pie Picache	Comedy, family	

=== 2009 ===
Title	Release date	Director	Cast	Genre(s)	Associated film production
Love Me Again	January 15	Rory Quintos	Angel Locsin, Piolo Pascual	Romance, drama	
You Changed My Life	February 25	Cathy Garcia-Molina	John Lloyd Cruz, Sarah Geronimo	Romantic comedy	Viva Films
T2	April 11	Chito Rono	Maricel Soriano, Mika Dela Cruz, Derek Ramsay	Horror, thriller	
BFF: Best Friends Forever	May 13	Wenn V. Deramas	Sharon Cuneta, Ai-Ai delas Alas, John Estrada	Comedy	
Villa Estrella	July 1	Rico Maria Ilarde	Shaina Magdayao, Jake Cuenca, Maja Salvador, Geoff Eigenmann, John Estrada	Horror	
And I Love You So	August 12	Laurenti M. Dyogi	Bea Alonzo, Sam Milby, Derek Ramsay	Romance, drama	
In My Life	September 16	Olivia Lamasan	Vilma Santos, John Lloyd Cruz, Luis Manzano	Drama	
Ang Tanging Pamilya: A Marry Go Round	November 11	Wenn V. Deramas	Ai-Ai delas Alas, Joseph Estrada, Toni Gonzaga, Sam Milby, Dionisia Pacquiao	Comedy	
I Love You, Goodbye	December 25	Laurice Guillen	Angelica Panganiban, Gabby Concepcion, Kim Chiu, Derek Ramsay	Romance, drama	

== 2010s ==
=== 2010 ===
Title	Release date	Director	Cast	Genre(s)	Associated film production
Paano Na Kaya	January 27	Ruel S. Bayani	Kim Chiu, Gerald Anderson	Romance, drama	
Miss You Like Crazy	February 24	Cathy Garcia-Molina	John Lloyd Cruz & Bea Alonzo	Romance, drama	
Babe, I Love You	April 3	Mae Czarina Cruz-Alviar	Anne Curtis, Sam Milby	Romance	Viva Films
Here Comes The Bride	May 12	Chris Martinez	Eugene Domingo, Angelica Panganiban, John Lapus, Tuesday Vargas, Jaime Fabregas	Comedy	OctoArts Films and Quantum Films
Noy	June 2	Dondon Santos	Coco Martin	Independent, Drama	CineMedia Films and VIP Access Media
I'll Be There	June 16	Maryo J. delos Reyes	Gabby Concepcion, KC Concepcion, Jericho Rosales	Drama, family	
Cinco	July 14	Frasco Mortiz, Enrico Santos, Cathy Garcia-Molina, Ato Bautista, Nick Olanka	Sam Concepcion, AJ Perez, Robi Domingo, Jodi Sta. Maria, Maja Salvador, Rayver Cruz, Mariel Rodriguez, Pokwang, Zanjoe Marudo	Horror, thriller	
Sa 'yo Lamang	September 1	Laurice Guillen	Lorna Tolentino, Christopher de Leon, Diether Ocampo, Coco Martin, Bea Alonzo, Enchong Dee, Miles Ocampo, Zanjoe Marudo, Lauren Young	Family drama	
I Do	September 29	Veronica B. Velasco	Erich Gonzales, Enchong Dee	Romantic comedy	
Till My Heartaches End	October 27	Jose Javier Reyes	Kim Chiu, Gerald Anderson	Drama, romance	
My Amnesia Girl	November 24	Cathy Garcia-Molina	Toni Gonzaga, John Lloyd Cruz	Romantic comedy	
Ang Tanging Ina Mo (Last na 'To!)	December 25	Wenn V. Deramas	Ai-Ai delas Alas, Eugene Domingo, Marvin Agustin, Nikki Valdez, Carlo Aquino, Alwyn Uytingco, Shaina Magdayao, Kaye Abad	Comedy, family	
Dalaw	December 25	Dondon Santos	Kris Aquino, Diether Ocampo, Gina Pareño, Alessandra De Rossi, Empress Schuck, Karylle	Horror, thriller	CineMedia and K Productions
RPG Metanoia	December 25	Luis C. Suárez	Zaijan Jaranilla, Aga Muhlach, Eugene Domingo, Vhong Navarro	Animated	Ambient Media and Thaumatrope Animation

=== 2011 ===
Title	Release date	Director	Cast	Genre(s)	Associated film production
Bulong	February 2	Chito S. Roño	Vhong Navarro, Angelica Panganiban, Bangs Garcia	Comedy, horror	
Catch Me, I'm in Love	March 23	Mae Czarina Cruz-Alviar	Sarah Geronimo, Gerald Anderson, Matteo Guidicelli	Comedy, romance	Viva Films
Tum, My Pledge of Love	April 6	Robin Padilla	Robin Padilla Mariel Rodriguez Ejay Falcon Quennie Padilla	Drama	
Pak! Pak! My Dr. Kwak!	April 23	Tony Y. Reyes	Vic Sotto, Bea Alonzo, Zaijan Jaranilla, Xyriel Manabat, Pokwang, Wally Bayola, Jose Manalo	Comedy	OctoArts Films, M – Zet TV Productions, Inc. and APT Entertainment
In The Name Of Love	May 11	Olivia Lamasan	Angel Locsin, Aga Muhlach, Jake Cuenca	Drama, romance	
Forever And A Day	June 15	Cathy Garcia-Molina	Sam Milby, KC Concepcion, Rayver Cruz	Romance	
The Adventures of Pureza: Queen of the Riles	July 13	Soxie H. Topacio	Melai Cantiveros, Jason Francisco, Joem Bascon, Martin del Rosario, Bianca Manalo	Comedy, drama	Sine Screen
Ang Babae sa Septic Tank	July 15	Marlon N. Rivera	Eugene Domingo	Comedy	Cinemalaya Martinez Rivera Films, Quantum Films and Straight Shooters Media, Inc.
Way Back Home	August 17	Jerry Lopez Sineneng	Kathryn Bernardo, Julia Montes, Enrique Gil, Sam Concepcion, Agot Isidro, Tonton Gutierrez	Drama, family	
Wedding Tayo, Wedding Hindi	August 31	Jose Javier Reyes	Eugene Domingo, Toni Gonzaga, Zanjoe Marudo, Wendell Ramos	Comedy	OctoArts Films
Ikaw ang Pag-ibig	September 14	Marilou Diaz-Abaya	Ina Feleo, Jomari Yllana, Marvin Agustin	Drama	Archdiocese of Caseres and Marilou Diaz-Abaya Film Institute and Arts Center
No Other Woman	September 28	Ruel S. Bayani	Anne Curtis, Derek Ramsay, Cristine Reyes	Drama, romance, thriller	Viva Films
The Unkabogable Praybeyt Benjamin	October 26	Wenn V. Deramas	Vice Ganda, Derek Ramsay	Comedy, action	Viva Films
Won't Last A Day Without You	November 30	Raz dela Torre	Sarah Geronimo, Gerald Anderson, Joey De Leon	Romance, comedy	Viva Films
Enteng Ng Ina Mo	December 25	Tony Y. Reyes	Ai-Ai de las Alas, Vic Sotto	Comedy, fantasy, family	OctoArts Films, M-Zet Films, and APT Entertainment
Segunda Mano	December 25	Joyce Bernal	Kris Aquino, Dingdong Dantes, Angelica Panganiban, Helen Gamboa	Horror, thriller	AgostoDos Pictures and K Productions

=== 2012 ===
Title	Release date	Director	Cast	Genre(s)	Associated film production
My Cactus Heart	January 25	Enrico Santos	Maja Salvador, Matteo Guidicelli, Xian Lim	Romance, comedy	Skylight Films
ÜnOfficially Yours	February 15	Cathy Garcia-Molina	Angel Locsin, John Lloyd Cruz	Romance, comedy	
Corazon: Ang Unang Aswang	March 14	Richard Somes	Erich Gonzales, Derek Ramsay, Mark Gil, Tetchie Agbayani	Psychological thriller	Skylight Films, Reality Entertainment, Strawdogs Studio
Every Breath U Take	May 16	Mae Czarina Cruz-Alviar	Piolo Pascual, Angelica Panganiban	Comedy, romance	
Born to Love You	May 30	Jerome Chavez Pobocan	Coco Martin, Angeline Quinto	Romance, Comedy, Drama	CineMedia
Kimmy Dora and the Temple of Kiyeme	June 13	Joyce Bernal	Eugene Domingo, Ariel Ureta, Dingdong Dantes, Zanjoe Marudo	Comedy	Spring Films
The Healing	July 25	Chito S. Roño	Vilma Santos, Kim Chiu	Horror, suspense	
The Reunion	August 15	Frasco Mortiz	Enrique Gil, Xian Lim, Enchong Dee, Kean Cipriano	Comedy, romance	
Amorosa: The Revenge	August 29	Topel Lee	Angel Aquino, Enrique Gil, Martin del Rosario, Empress Schuck, Carlo Aquino, Ejay Falcon, Jane Oineza	Psychological horror, drama	Skylight Films
The Mistress	September 12	Olivia Lamasan	Bea Alonzo, John Lloyd Cruz, Ronaldo Valdez, Hilda Koronel	Drama, romance	
This Guy's in Love with U Mare!	October 10	Wenn V. Deramas	Vice Ganda, Toni Gonzaga, Luis Manzano	Comedy, romantic comedy	Viva Films
Suddenly It's Magic	October 31	Rory Quintos	Erich Gonzales, Mario Maurer	Comedy, romance	
24/7 in Love	November 21	John D. Lazatin, Mae Czarina Cruz-Alviar, Frasco Santos Mortiz, Dado Lumibao	Bea Alonzo, Gerald Anderson, Kathryn Bernardo, Kim Chiu, John Lloyd Cruz, Zaijian Jaranilla, Xyriel Manabat, Zanjoe Marudo, Sam Milby, Diether Ocampo, Daniel Padilla, Angelica Panganiban, Piolo Pascual, Pokwang, Maja Salvador	Romance, comedy	
Sisterakas	December 25	Wenn V. Deramas	Ai-Ai delas Alas, Vice Ganda, Kris Aquino, Kathryn Bernardo, Daniel Padilla, Xyriel Manabat	Comedy, parody	Viva Films
One More Try	December 25	Ruel S. Bayani	Angel Locsin, Angelica Panganiban, Dingdong Dantes, Zanjoe Marudo	Romance, drama	

=== 2013 ===
Title	Release date	Director	Cast	Genre(s)	Associated film production
A Moment in Time	February 13	Emmanuel Quindo Palo	Coco Martin and Julia Montes	Romance, drama	Dreamscape Cinema
Must Be... Love	March 13	Dado Lumibao	Kathryn Bernardo and Daniel Padilla	Romantic comedy	
It Takes a Man and a Woman	March 30	Cathy Garcia-Molina	John Lloyd Cruz and Sarah Geronimo	Romantic comedy	Viva Films
Bromance: My Brother's Romance	May 15	Wenn V. Deramas	Zanjoe Marudo and Cristine Reyes	Comedy	Skylight Films
Four Sisters and a Wedding	June 26	Cathy Garcia-Molina	Toni Gonzaga, Bea Alonzo, Angel Locsin, Shaina Magdayao, Enchong Dee and Coney Reyes	Drama, romantic comedy	
Tuhog	July 17	Veronica Velasco	Eugene Domingo, Enchong Dee, Jake Cuenca, Empress Schuck and Leo Martinez	Dark comedy	Skylight Films
Bakit Hindi Ka Crush ng Crush Mo?	July 31	Joyce Bernal	Kim Chiu and Xian Lim	Romantic comedy	
Ekstra	August 14	Jeffrey Jeturian	Vilma Santos	Comedy drama	Cinemalaya Foundation and Quantum Films
On the Job	August 28	Erik Matti	Piolo Pascual, Gerald Anderson and Joel Torre	Action, crime, thriller	Reality Entertainment
Momzillas	September 18	Wenn V. Deramas	Maricel Soriano, Eugene Domingo, Billy Crawford and Andi Eigenmann	Comedy	Viva Films
Kung Fu Divas	October 2	Onat Diaz	Ai Ai delas Alas and Marian Rivera	Action, comedy, fantasy	Reality Entertainment, The O&Co. Picture Factory
She's The One	October 16	Mae Czarina Cruz-Alviar	Bea Alonzo, Dingdong Dantes and Enrique Gil	Romantic comedy	
Call Center Girl	November 27	Don Cuaresma	Pokwang, Jessy Mendiola and Enchong Dee	Comedy drama	Skylight Films
Girl, Boy, Bakla, Tomboy	December 25	Wenn V. Deramas	Maricel Soriano, Joey Marquez, Cristine Reyes, Vice Ganda, Ejay Falcon, JC de Vera, Karylle, Ruffa Gutierrez, Carlo Aquino, Mylene Dizon and Gabby Concepcion	Comedy, parody	Viva Films
Pagpag: Siyam na Buhay	December 25	Frasco S. Mortiz	Kathryn Bernardo, Daniel Padilla, Paulo Avelino and Shaina Magdayao	Suspense, horror	Regal Entertainment

=== 2014 ===
Title	Release date	Director	Cast	Genre(s)	Associated film production
Bride for Rent	January 15	Mae Cruz-Alviar	Kim Chiu, Xian Lim	Romantic comedy	
Sa Ngalan ng Ama, Ina, at mga Anak	January 29	Jon Villarin	Robin Padilla, Mariel Rodriguez, Kylie Padilla, Daniel Padilla, Bela Padilla	Action, drama	RCP Productions
Starting Over Again	February 12	Olivia Lamasan	Toni Gonzaga, Piolo Pascual, Iza Calzado	Romance, drama	
Da Possessed	April 19	Joyce Bernal	Vhong Navarro, Solenn Heussaff	Horror, comedy	Regal Entertainment
Maybe This Time	May 28	Jerry Lopez Sineneng	Sarah Geronimo, Coco Martin	Romantic comedy	Viva Films
My Illegal Wife	June 11	Tony Y. Reyes	Pokwang, Zanjoe Marudo, Ellen Adarna	Romantic comedy	Skylight Films
She's Dating the Gangster	July 16	Cathy Garcia-Molina	Kathryn Bernardo, Daniel Padilla, Dawn Zulueta, Richard Gomez	Romance, drama	Star Cinema
Once A Princess	August 6	Laurice Guillen	Erich Gonzales, Enchong Dee, JC de Vera	Romance, drama	Skylight Films, Regal Entertainment
Talk Back and You're Dead	August 20	Andoy Ranay	James Reid, Nadine Lustre, Joseph Marco	Teen romance	Skylight Films, Viva Films
Maria Leonora Teresa	September 17	Wenn V. Deramas	Iza Calzado, Zanjoe Marudo, Jodi Sta. Maria	Horror, thriller, drama	
The Trial	October 15	Chito S. Roño	John Lloyd Cruz, Richard Gomez, Gretchen Barretto, Jessy Mendiola, Enrique Gil	Drama, crime, romance	
Beauty in a Bottle	October 29	Antoinette Jadaone	Angelica Panganiban, Angeline Quinto, Assunta de Rossi	Comedy	Quantum Films, Skylight Films
Past Tense	November 26	Mae Czarina Cruz-Alviar	Ai-Ai de las Alas, Kim Chiu, Xian Lim	Romance, comedy	
The Amazing Praybeyt Benjamin	December 25	Wenn V. Deramas	Vice Ganda, Richard Yap, James "Bimby" Aquino-Yap, Alex Gonzaga, Tom Rodriguez	Comedy, action, adventure	Viva Films
Feng Shui 2	December 25	Chito S. Roño	Kris Aquino, Coco Martin, Cherry Pie Picache	Horror, suspense, thriller, drama	K Productions; CCM Productions

=== 2015 ===
Title	Release date	Director	Cast	Genre(s)	Associated film production
Halik sa Hangin	January 28	Emmanuel Quindo Palo	Gerald Anderson, Julia Montes and JC de Vera	Mystery, thriller, romance	
Crazy Beautiful You	February 25	Mae Czarina Cruz-Alviar	Kathryn Bernardo and Daniel Padilla	Romance, comedy, drama	
You're My Boss	April 4	Antoinette Jadaone	Toni Gonzaga and Coco Martin	Romance, comedy	
Kid Kulafu	April 15	Paul Soriano	Buboy Villar, Alessandra de Rossi and Cesar Montano	Biographical, sports, drama	Ten17P
Para sa Hopeless Romantic	May 13	Andoy Ranay	James Reid, Nadine Lustre, Iñigo Pascual and Julia Barretto	Teen romance	Viva Films
You're Still The One	May 27	Chris Martinez	Maja Salvador, Ellen Adarna, Richard Yap and Dennis Trillo	Romance, drama	Regal Entertainment
Just The Way You Are	June 17	Theodore Boborol	Enrique Gil and Liza Soberano	Teen romance	Summit Media
The Breakup Playlist	July 1	Dan Villegas	Piolo Pascual and Sarah Geronimo	Music, romance, drama	Viva Films
The Love Affair	August 12	Nuel Naval	Richard Gomez and Dawn Zulueta with Bea Alonzo	Romance, drama	
Ex with Benefits	September 2	Gino M. Santos	Derek Ramsay, Coleen Garcia and Meg Imperial	Erotic drama, romance	Viva Films Skylight Films
Etiquette for Mistresses	September 30	Chito S. Roño	Kris Aquino, Claudine Barretto, Kim Chiu, Iza Calzado and Cheena Crab	Romance, drama	K Productions
Everyday I Love You	October 28	Mae Czarina Cruz-Alviar	Enrique Gil, Liza Soberano and Gerald Anderson	Romance, drama	
A Second Chance	November 25	Cathy Garcia-Molina	John Lloyd Cruz and Bea Alonzo	Romance, drama	
Beauty and the Bestie	December 25	Wenn V. Deramas	Vice Ganda, Coco Martin, James Reid and Nadine Lustre	Comedy action	Viva Films
All You Need Is Pag-Ibig	December 25	Antoinette Jadaone	Kris Aquino, Derek Ramsay, Jodi Sta. Maria, Ian Veneracion, Nova Villa, Ronaldo Valdez, Xian Lim, Kim Chiu, Pokwang, Bimby Aquino Yap, Julia Concio and Talia Concio	Comedy romance	K Productions

=== 2016 ===
Title	Release date	Director	Cast	Genre(s)	Associated film production
Everything About Her	January 27	Joyce Bernal	Vilma Santos, Angel Locsin and Xian Lim	Comedy, drama	
Always Be My Maybe	February 24	Dan Villegas	Gerald Anderson and Arci Muñoz	Romance, comedy	
Just the 3 of Us	May 4	Cathy Garcia-Molina	John Lloyd Cruz and Jennylyn Mercado	Romance, comedy	
Love Me Tomorrow	May 25	Gino M. Santos	Piolo Pascual, Dawn Zulueta and Coleen Garcia	Romance, comedy	
The Achy Breaky Hearts	June 29	Antoinette Jadaone	Jodi Sta. Maria, Ian Veneracion and Richard Yap	Romance, comedy	
Dukot	July 13	Paul Soriano	Enrique Gil, Shaina Magdayao, Ricky Davao, Christopher de Leon and Ping Medina	Suspense, thriller, drama	Ten17P
How to Be Yours	July 27	Dan Villegas	Bea Alonzo and Gerald Anderson	Romance, drama	
Barcelona: A Love Untold	September 14	Olivia Lamasan	Kathryn Bernardo and Daniel Padilla	Romance, drama	
The Third Party	October 12	Jason Paul Laxamana	Angel Locsin, Sam Milby and Zanjoe Marudo	Romance, comedy	
The Unmarried Wife	November 16	Maryo J. de los Reyes	Angelica Panganiban, Dingdong Dantes and Paulo Avelino	Romance, drama	
The Super Parental Guardians	November 30	Joyce Bernal	Vice Ganda, Coco Martin, Simon Pineda and Awra Briguela	Comedy, action	CCM Productions
Vince and Kath and James	December 25	Theodore Boborol	Julia Barretto, Joshua Garcia, Ronnie Alonte and Maris Racal	Romance, comedy	

=== 2017 ===
Title	Release date	Director	Cast	Genre(s)	Associated film production
Extra Service	January 11	Chris Martinez	Arci Muñoz, Coleen Garcia and Jessy Mendiola	Action, Comedy	Skylight Films
My Ex and Whys	February 15	Cathy Garcia-Molina	Enrique Gil and Liza Soberano	Romance, Comedy, Drama	
Northern Lights: A Journey to Love	March 29	Dondon S. Santos	Piolo Pascual, Raikko Mateo and Yen Santos	Drama	Regal Entertainment, Spring Films
Can't Help Falling In Love	April 15	Mae Cruz-Alviar	Kathryn Bernardo and Daniel Padilla	Romance, Comedy, Drama	
Dear Other Self	May 17	Veronica B. Velasco	Jodi Sta. Maria, Xian Lim and Joseph Marco	Romance, Comedy, Drama	
Can We Still Be Friends?	June 14	Prime Cruz	Gerald Anderson and Arci Muñoz	Romance, Comedy	
Bloody Crayons	July 12	Topel Lee	Jane Oineza, Maris Racal, Sofia Andres, Diego Loyzaga, Elmo Magalona, Yves Flores, Ronnie Alonte, Empoy Marquez and Janella Salvador	Horror, Suspense, Thriller	
Finally Found Someone	July 26	Theodore Boborol	John Lloyd Cruz and Sarah Geronimo	Romance, Drama, Comedy	Viva Films
Love You to the Stars and Back	August 30	Antoinette Jadaone	Julia Barretto and Joshua Garcia	Romance, Comedy, Drama	
Loving in Tandem	September 13	Giselle Andres	Maymay Entrata, Edward Barber, Marco Gallo and Kisses Delavin	Romance, Comedy	
Last Night	September 27	Joyce Bernal	Piolo Pascual and Toni Gonzaga	Dark romance, Comedy, Drama	Spring Films, N²
Seven Sundays	October 11	Cathy Garcia-Molina	Aga Muhlach, Dingdong Dantes, Cristine Reyes, Enrique Gil and Ronaldo Valdez	Comedy, Family drama	
The Ghost Bride	November 1	Chito S. Roño	Kim Chiu, Matteo Guidicelli, Christian Bables and Alice Dixson	Horror, Suspense, Thriller	
Unexpectedly Yours	November 29	Cathy Garcia-Molina	Sharon Cuneta, Julia Barretto, Joshua Garcia and Robin Padilla	Romance, Comedy	RCP Productions
Ang Panday	December 25	Rodel Nacianceno	Coco Martin	Action, Fantasy	CCM Film Productions, Viva Films
Gandarrapiddo: The Revenger Squad	December 25	Joyce Bernal	Vice Ganda Daniel Padilla and Pia Wurtzbach	Superhero, Comedy	Viva Films

=== 2018 ===
Title	Release date	Director	Cast	Genre(s)	Associated film production
Ang Dalawang Mrs. Reyes	January 17	Jun Robles Lana	Judy Ann Santos and Angelica Panganiban	Comedy	Quantum Films, IdeaFirst Company
Sin Island	February 14	Gino M. Santos	Xian Lim, Coleen Garcia and Nathalie Hart	Erotic thriller, Drama	
My Perfect You	March 14	Cathy Garcia-Molina	Gerald Anderson and Pia Wurtzbach	Romance, Comedy	
DOTGA: Da One That Ghost Away	April 18	Tony Y. Reyes	Ryan Bang, Maymay Entrata, Edward Barber, Kim Chiu and Enzo Pineda	Horror, Comedy	
Kasal	May 16	Ruel S. Bayani	Bea Alonzo, Derek Ramsay and Paulo Avelino	Romance, Drama	
I Love You, Hater and [Loving, Pablo]	July 11	Giselle Andres	Kris Aquino, Julia Barretto and Joshua Garcia	Romance, Drama, Comedy	
Kusina Kings	July 25	Victor Villanueva	Zanjoe Marudo, Empoy Marquez, Ryan Bang, Nathalie Hart and Maxine Medina	Comedy	
The Hows of Us	August 29	Cathy Garcia-Molina	Kathryn Bernardo and Daniel Padilla	Romance, Drama	
First Love	October 17	Paul Soriano	Bea Alonzo and Aga Muhlach	Romance, Drama	Viva Films, Ten17P
Three Words to Forever	November 28	Cathy Garcia-Molina	Sharon Cuneta, Richard Gomez and Kathryn Bernardo	Family, Romance, Drama, Comedy	
Fantastica	December 25	Barry Gonzalez	Vice Ganda, Richard Gutierrez, Dingdong Dantes, Kisses Delavin, Donny Pangilinan, Loisa Andalio, Ronnie Alonte, Maymay Entrata, Edward Barber, Jaclyn Jose, Ryan Bang and Bela Padilla	Fantasy, Comedy	Viva Films
The Girl in the Orange Dress	December 25	Jay Abello	Jericho Rosales and Jessy Mendiola	Romance, Comedy	Quantum Films, MJM Productions

=== 2019 ===
Title	Release date	Director	Cast	Genre(s)	Associated film production
Eerie	March 27	Mikhail Red	Bea Alonzo, Jake Cuenca, Maxene Magalona and Charo Santos-Concio	Horror, Suspense, Thriller, Crime	Cre8 Productions, Pelikula Red, Media East
Last Fool Show	April 10	Eduardo Roy Jr.	JM de Guzman and Arci Muñoz	Romance, Comedy	N^{2} Productions, Emba Productions
Quezon's Game	May 29	Matthew E. Rosen	Raymond Bagatsing and Rachel Alejandro	History, Drama	Kinetek Productions
Hello, Love, Goodbye	July 31	Cathy Garcia-Molina	Kathryn Bernardo and Alden Richards	Romance, Drama	
Hellcome Home	October 30	Bobby Bonifacio Jr.	Dennis Trillo, Alyssa Muhlach, Beauty Gonzalez, Teejay Marquez and Raymond Bagatsing	Horror, Suspense, Thriller	IWantTFC, Pelikula Indiopendent
Unbreakable	November 27	Mae Cruz-Alviar	Bea Alonzo, Angelica Panganiban and Richard Gutierrez	Romance, Comedy, Drama	
The Mall, The Merrier	December 25	Barry Gonzalez	Vice Ganda and Anne Curtis	Comedy, Musical	Viva Films

== 2020s ==
=== 2020 ===
Title	Release date	Director	Cast	Genre(s)	Associated film production
Block Z	January 29	Mikhail Red	Julia Barretto, Joshua Garcia, Maris Racal, Yves Flores, Ina Raymundo, Ian Veneracion, McCoy de Leon, Myrtle Sarrosa and Dimples Romana	Horror, Suspense, Thriller, Zombie Apocalypse	Keep Filming Productions
James and Pat and Dave	February 12	Theodore Boborol	Ronnie Alonte, Loisa Andalio and Donny Pangilinan	Romance, Comedy	
Yellow Rose	October 9	Diane Paragas	Eva Noblezada, Dale Watson, Princess Punzalan, Lea Salonga	Musical, Drama	Stage 6, Sony Pictures Releasing
U-Turn	October 30	Roderick Cabrido	Kim Chiu, JM De Guzman and Tony Labrusca	Horror	
My Lockdown Romance	November 13	Bobby Bonifacio Jr.	Jameson Blake and Joao Constancia	Romance, Comedy, Boys’ Love	
Boyette: Not a Girl Yet	November 27	Jumbo Albano	Zaijan Jaranilla, Maris Racal, and Iñigo Pascual	Boys' Love, Comedy	
Four Sisters Before the Wedding	December 11	Mae Cruz-Alviar	Alexa Ilacad, Charlie Dizon, Gillian Vicencio, Belle Mariano, Clarence Delgado, Carmina Villarroel and Dominic Ochoa	Family Drama, Comedy	SCX
Mang Kepweng: Ang Lihim ng Bandanang Itim	December 25	Topel Lee	Vhong Navarro	Fantasy, Horror, adventure, Comedy	Cineko Productions

=== 2021 ===
Title	Release date	Director	Cast	Genre(s)	Associated film production
Princess DayaReese	January 1	Barry Gonzalez	Maymay Entrata and Edward Barber	Romance, Comedy	
Love or Money	March 12	Mae Cruz-Alviar	Coco Martin and Angelica Panganiban	Romance, Comedy	
Momshies! Ang Soul Mo'y Akin!	May 28	Easy Ferrer	Karla Estrada, Jolina Magdangal and Melai Cantiveros	Comedy, Family	
Love Is Color Blind	December 10	John Leo Datuin Garcia	Donny Pangilinan and Belle Mariano	Romance, Comedy	
Love at First Stream	December 25	Cathy Garcia-Molina	Daniela Stranner, Anthony Jennings, Kaori Oinuma and Jeremiah Lisbo	Romance, Family	Kumu

=== 2022 ===
Title	Release date	Director	Cast	Genre(s)	Associated film production
An Inconvenient Love	November 23	Petersen Vargas	Donny Pangilinan and Belle Mariano	Romance, Comedy	
Labyu with an Accent	December 25	Rodel Nacianceno	Coco Martin and Jodi Sta. Maria	Romance, Comedy	
Partners in Crime	December 25	Cathy Garcia-Molina	Vice Ganda and Ivana Alawi	Action Comedy	Viva Films

=== 2023 ===
Title	Release date	Director	Cast	Genre(s)	Associated film production
A Very Good Girl	September 27	Petersen Vargas	Kathryn Bernardo and Dolly de Leon	Mystery Film, Dark comedy	
Rewind	December 25	Mae Cruz-Alviar	Dingdong Dantes and Marian Rivera	Family drama	APT Entertainment, AgostoDos Pictures

=== 2024 ===
Title	Release date	Director	Cast	Genre(s)	Associated film production
Un/Happy for You	August 14	Petersen Vargas	Joshua Garcia and Julia Barretto	Romantic drama	ABS-CBN Studios, Viva Films
Hello, Love, Again	November 13	Cathy Garcia-Sampana	Kathryn Bernardo and Alden Richards	Romantic drama	ABS-CBN Studios, GMA Pictures
And the Breadwinner Is…	December 25	Jun Robles Lana	Vice Ganda and Eugene Domingo	Comedy Family drama	ABS-CBN Studios, The IdeaFirst Company

=== 2025 ===
Title	Release date	Director	Cast	Genre(s)	Associated film production
My Love Will Make You Disappear	March 26	Chad Vidanes	Kim Chiu and Paulo Avelino	Romantic comedy	ABS-CBN Studios
Only We Know	June 11	Irene Villamor	Dingdong Dantes and Charo Santos-Concio	Romance	Cornerstone Studios, AgostoDos Pictures, 7K Entertainment
Meet, Greet & Bye	November 12	Cathy Garcia-Sampana	Piolo Pascual, Belle Mariano, Joshua Garcia, Juan Karlos Labajo, and Maricel Soriano	Family drama	ABS-CBN Studios
Call Me Mother	December 25	Jun Robles Lana	Vice Ganda and Nadine Lustre	Comedy drama	ABS-CBN Studios, The IdeaFirst Company, Viva Films
Love You So Bad	December 25	Mae Cruz-Alviar	Will Ashley, Bianca de Vera, Dustin Yu	Romance	ABS-CBN Studios, GMA Pictures, Regal Entertainment

=== 2026 ===
Title	Release date	Director	Cast	Genre(s)	Associated film production
Tayo sa Wakas	May 27	Cathy Garcia-Sampana	Donny Pangilinan and Belle Mariano	Romance film	ABS-CBN Studios
Always Yours, Never Mine	September 30	Cathy Garcia-Sampana	Joshua Garcia and Julia Barretto	Romantic Drama	ABS-CBN Studios
Remember	November 11	Mae Cruz-Alviar	Dingdong Dantes and Marian Rivera	Drama, Romance film	ABS-CBN Studios, APT Entertainment, Regal Entertainment, AgostoDos Pictures

== Upcoming films ==
Release date	Title	Director	Cast	Genre(s)	Status	Associated film production	Ref.
December 25, 2026	The Greatest Showdown	Jun Robles Lana	Vice Ganda and Vic Sotto	Comedy	Pre-production	ABS-CBN Studios, The IdeaFirst Company; APT Entertainment, & M-Zet Productions	
TBA	Nang Mapagod si Kamatayan	Dan Villegas	Daniel Padilla and Zanjoe Marudo	Buddy film, Black Comedy	Pre-production	ABS-CBN Studios, Quantum Films	
