= And I Love You So (film) =

- Theatrical movie poster
- Directed by: Laurenti M. Dyogi
- Written by: Vanessa R. Valdez; Jacqueline V. Franquelli
- Produced by: Elma S. Medua
- Starring: Bea Alonzo; Sam Milby; Derek Ramsay
- Cinematography: Gary L. Gardoce; Anne Monzon
- Edited by: Marya Ignacio
- Music by: Carmina Cuya
- Production company: Star Cinema
- Release date: August 12, 2009
- Running time: 120 minutes
- Country: Philippines
- Language: Filipino
- Box office: ₱89.3 million

And I Love You So is a 2009 Philippine romantic drama film directed by Laurenti Dyogi and starring Bea Alonzo, Sam Milby and Derek Ramsay. This film reunites Alonzo and Milby who previously starred together in Close to You (2006). Produced by Star Cinema, the film was released in celebration of the studio's 16th anniversary. The film describes the feeling of forbidden love for another person when that love may not be forbidden at all.

The film was well received by critics and was nominated for different film and entertainment awards.

== Plot ==
Lara (Bea Alonzo) meets the love of her life, Oliver Cruz (Derek Ramsay). They live a happy married life. She falls in love with Oliver all over again each and every day because of his charm, and also because he was her first love ever. Yet, five months later, Oliver dies of an aneurysm, and financial problems occur for Lara, not to mention heartbreak. At the suggestion of her friends, she rents out the former condominium she and Oliver lived in to a man named Chris Panlilio (Sam Milby), and then decides to live with her mother-in-law, Kate, and sister-in-law, Audrey. Intent to help his landlady learn to move on with her life, Chris decides to guide Lara into doing different daily activities to be happy again, in exchange for her teaching him proper Tagalog. Yet this newfound friendship turns into something more special, and Lara is not sure how to embrace it.

== Cast ==
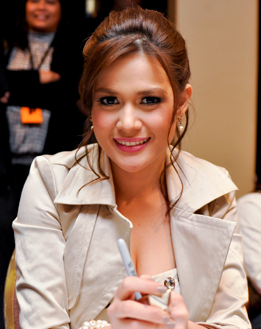
Bea Alonzo portrays Lara Cruz

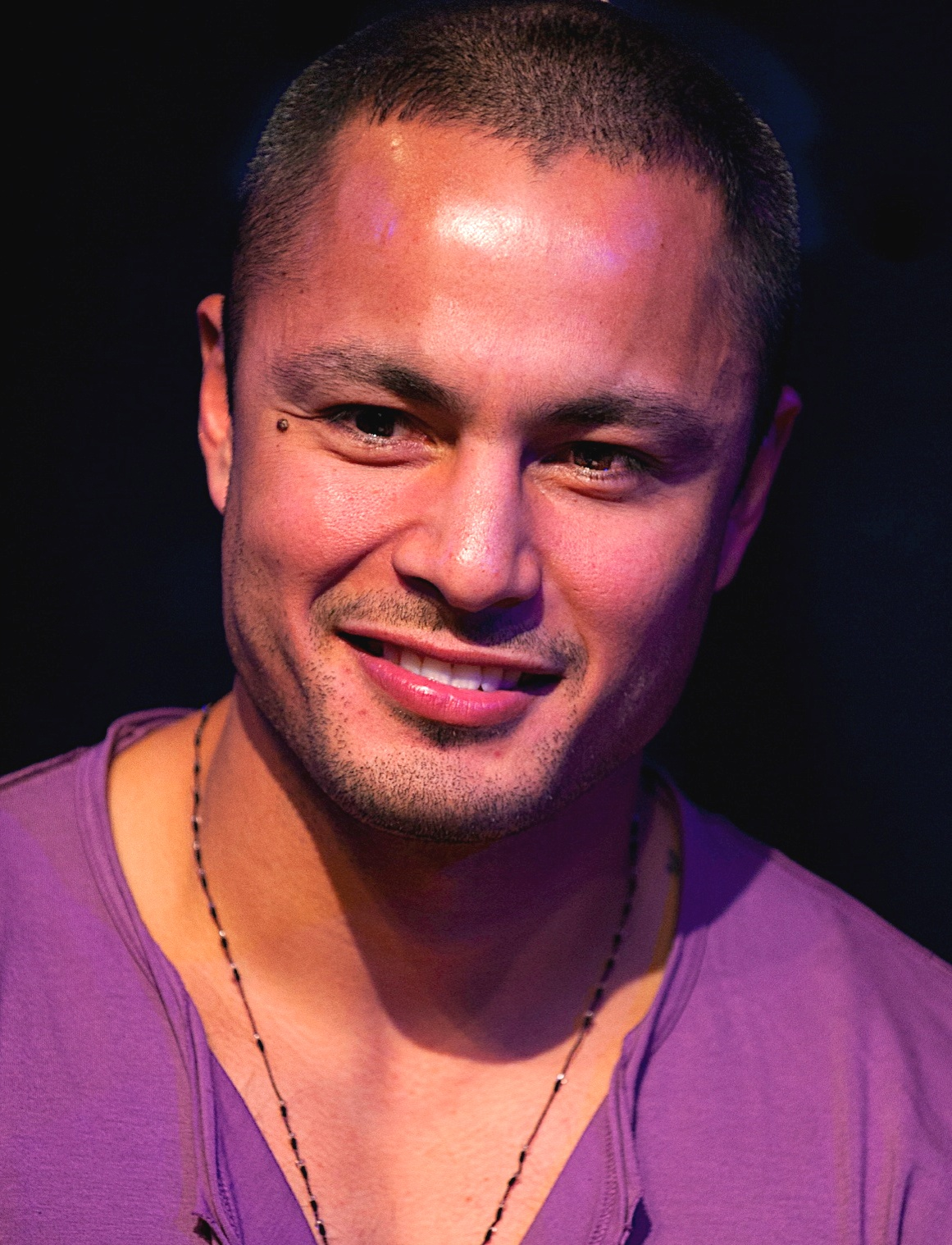
Derek Ramsay, portrays, Oliver Cruz

- Bea Alonzo as Lara Cruz
- Sam Milby as Chris Panlilio
- Derek Ramsay as Oliver Cruz
- Coney Reyes as Kate Cruz
- Nikki Gil as Audrey Cruz
- Candy Pangilinan as Teacher Paula
- Maricar Reyes as Rachel
- Kakai Bautista as Teacher Lani
- Dick Israel as Jun Panlilio
- Angel Jacob as Jane
- RJ Ledesma as Mike Panlilio
- Janna Dominguez as Teacher Teresa
- Cai Cortez as Teacher Grace
- Gilette Sandico as Margie
- Isabel Rivas as Melanie
- Niña Dolino as Sexy Girl 1
- Kristel Moreno as Sexy Girl 3

== Reception ==
And I Love You So earned second place in the Philippines during its opening weekend (August 12, 2009 - August 16, 2009) after G.I. Joe: The Rise of Cobra. The film earned ₱20,470,000.00 (or US$424,470.00) in revenue. During its second week, the film stayed in the Top 5 films of that weekend holding spot Number 3 behind Disney's Up and G.I. Joe: The Rise of Cobra, respectively. It earned ₱10,596,134.00. As of its first two weeks in Philippine theatres, it garnered a gross revenue of ₱36,329,604.00 As of January 2010, the film has grossed ₱89, 300,000.00 in revenue. The film received generally favorable reviews.

== Production ==
And I Love You So was the first Star Cinema-produced film not to be shown in any theater operated by SM City Chain, the largest in the Philippines. ABS-CBN canceled releasing the film after a negotiation over profit sharing between the two companies bogged down.

"And I Love You So" was a popular song by Don McLean and Perry Como. The song was covered by Gary Valenciano for the film. A version by Sam Milby was also used in the film.

=== Full Cast & Crew ===
- Starring: Bea Alonzo, Derek Ramsay, & Sam Milby Together With Coney Reyes, Cai Cortez, Maricar Reyes, Nikki Gil, Candy Pangilinan, Kristel Moreno, Niña Dolino, Cacai Bautista, Dick Israel, Gilette Sandico, Angel Jacob, Isabel Rivas, & Janna Dominguez
- Directed by: Laurenti Dyogi
- Produced by: Kara Kintanar, Elma S. Medua, Charo Santos-Concio & Malou Santos
- Music by: Carmina Cuya
- Film Edited by: Marya Ignacio
- Production Designed by: Nancy Arcega (as Nancy M. Arcega)
- Story & Screenplay by: Vanessa R. Valdez & Jacqueline Franquelli (as Jacqueline V. Franquelli)
- Sound by: April Castro (dubbing supervisor), Noel Urbano (dubbing supervisor)
- Camera & Electrical Department: Jun Agravante (still photographer) (as Ely Agravante), Raul Agravante (still photographer), Joel Casaul (car mount/tents - as Joel Casaol), Nonito Cesario (second assistant camera)

== See also ==
- List of Philippine films of the 2000s
