= Cathy Garcia-Sampana =

Filipino film and television director

- Born: Catherine Rosales Garcia; November 28, 1971 (age 54); Quezon City, Philippines
- Other name: Cathy Garcia-Molina (formerly)
- Education: University of the Philippines Diliman
- Occupations: Film and television director
- Years active: 1993–present
- Spouses: Philip Molina (m. 2001; died 2009) Louie Sampana (m. 2023)
- Children: 2

Catherine "Cathy" Rosales Garcia-Sampana (Tagalog pronunciation: [gaɾˈsɪa samˈpɐnɐ]; formerly Molina; born November 28, 1971) is a Filipino film and television director best known for directing romantic comedy and family drama films produced and distributed by Star Cinema. She has also directed a few television series on ABS-CBN, being one of the network's resident directors. Her films have been the highest-grossing Filipino film of the year on nine occasions, and on six occasions have been the highest-grossing Filipino film of all time.

== Major films ==
=== One More Chance (2007) ===
In 2007, Sampana worked with John Lloyd Cruz and Bea Alonzo for the second time in the film One More Chance (first time was in the film Close to You), released by Star Cinema. It differed from her previous films, becoming her first romantic film to contain such solid drama and a mature feeling. In an interview, she stated "This one's different, though, as it's more of a drama and not really a romantic-comedy. In romantic comedies, we usually follow the formula of the two lovers having a cute meet, then they start fighting each other, but you know that in the end, they will still end up in each other's arms. This time, the film opens showing the lovers [...] breaking up right at the start of the story. That's why this is really different from any movie I've done before or any movie John Lloyd and Bea have made in the past." The film was given a B rating by the Cinema Evaluation Board (CEB), saying "[Cruz and Alonzo] have graduated from their bubble-gummy roles and can really be considered serious actors now." The board also described their performance as "very good and sensitive." Aside from receiving positive response from film critics, the film did well in the box-office, grossing ₱66,334,614 in its opening weekend. It grossed a total of ₱152,791,025 ($3,684,908), becoming the highest-grossing Filipino film of 2007, and the fourth highest-grossing film of 2007 in the Philippines, behind Spider-Man 3, Transformers and Harry Potter and the Order of the Phoenix. The film also won Sampana the Movie Director of the Year trophy in the 2008 PCPI Star Awards for Movies.

=== A Very Special Love (2008) ===
In 2008, Sampana directed A Very Special Love, a romantic comedy film which talks about Laida Magtalas (portrayed by Sarah Geronimo) who is a fresh graduate and applies for a job in a magazine publishing company owned by Miggy Montenegro (played by John Lloyd Cruz). Laida is a simple girl and is the breadwinner of her family, while Miggy is a rich, handsome businessman. The movie is about two young people with totally different backgrounds, but they discover that love truly knows no barriers. It is the first film of Cruz and Geronimo together, after their successful team-up in an episode of the Maalaala Mo Kaya TV series entitled "Kwintas". The film was released as part of Star Cinema's fifteenth anniversary, in collaboration with VIVA Films. It marked the first project that Molina has worked with Geronimo. Molina expressed that people knew Geronimo for being a dramatic actress, based on the TV series she has appeared on, and that she wanted to show the lightness of the actress. She described Geronimo as "light and kikay," saying that it was easy to work with her. A Very Special Love was rated A by the CEB, with its comedic and innocent concept in contrast to One More Chance. The film earned ₱58,448,223 at the box-office in its opening weekend. It became a commercial success, grossing a total of ₱179,569,117 ($3,836,701) and becoming the highest-grossing Filipino film of 2008 (second highest-grossing film of 2008 in the Philippines behind Iron Man). The film later overtook Ang Tanging Ina in terms of revenue, and is currently the fifth highest-grossing Filipino film of all time. It also earned Molina three Best Director nominations from major awarding organizations.

=== You Changed My Life (2009) ===
In 2009, Star Cinema and VIVA Films released the much-awaited sequel to A Very Special Love, entitled You Changed My Life. The film was rushed, since the production companies wanted the sequel to have a Valentine's Day release. The film was directed, still, by Sampana, with John Lloyd Cruz and Sarah Geronimo reprising their roles. Rayver Cruz was cast as Mackoy, Laida's high school best friend who later broke away for their group and went to a different college. The story revolves around the growing relationship of Miggy and Laida as a couple. Things get tough when Miggy was assigned to manage his family's business in Laguna far from Laida. Having no time for his girl, Laida finds comfort in Mackoy's arms. Like its prequel, the film was also rated A by the CEB and received positive reviews from movie critics. Karen A. Pagsolingan of Philippine Entertainment Portal stated "I have two words for the movie: Entertaining and engaging!" She described the plot as "flawless," and praised Molina's surprises and "avant garde tactics." You Changed My Life earned ₱97,893,449 in its opening weekend, becoming the highest opening weekend for a Filipino film. The film was a box-office hit, grossing a total of ₱230,436,128 ($4,724,411) and eventually becoming the highest-grossing Filipino film in record time. It is also the first Filipino film to surpass the ₱200 million mark, after Ruel S. Bayani's No Other Woman did the same in 2011. You Changed My Life was the highest-grossing Filipino film of 2009 and the fifth highest-grossing film of 2009 in the Philippines behind Transformers: Revenge of the Fallen, Avatar, The Twilight Saga: New Moon and 2012. The film earned Molina a Best Director nomination from the 2010 ENPRESS Golden Screen Awards.

=== Miss You Like Crazy (2010) ===
In 2010, Molina's fifth project with John Lloyd Cruz and third with Bea Alonzo, entitled Miss You Like Crazy, was released under Star Cinema. Like One More Chance, the film is a romantic drama with a mature concept. Cruz and Alonzo played the roles of star-crossed lovers, Alan Alvarez and Mia Samonte. Fate throws them chances to be together, but time is not their ally. When they first meet on board the Pasig River Ferry Service, they are instantly attracted to each other. Both of them are from the middle-class and are down-to-earth. As they bond over Divisoria shopping and all-night conversations over coffee, Allan starts to doubt his feelings for his high maintenance fiancée Daphne (portrayed by Maricar Reyes) who happens to be the daughter of his boss. Sooner, Alan and Mia learn that "time is meaningless when you're in love." The film was shot both in the Philippines and Malaysia. The performance of the cast was praised by critics, but the story was panned film reviewers. Philippine Entertainment Portal stated "Star Cinema's weakness is its inability to produce a realistic ending [...] this perfect world only exists in fairy tales. In the real world, the more prevailing concepts are moving on and acceptance." The same opinion was given by Manila Bulletin, saying "A Cathy Molina film always ends happily, although one would probably hope it wouldn’t, for a change, and adhere to a bit of realism [...] Another problem was the unexplored subplots." Despite mixed response to the film, Miss You Like Crazy became a commercial hit, grossing a total of ₱138.27 million ($3,183,529) in the box-office and becoming the second highest-grossing Filipino film of 2010 only behind My Amnesia Girl, which also stars Cruz in the lead role.

== Personal life ==
Catherine Rosales Garcia was born on November 28, 1971, in Quezon City, Philippines. She is the youngest child among Sikatuna Antonio Garcia and Luisa Rosales Garcia's nine children. Garcia graduated with a mass communication degree from the University of the Philippines Diliman in 1992.

She was married to engineer and technical director Philip Rey "Epoy" Molina (who died from a vehicular accident in 2009) in 2001 with two children.

Garcia married cinematographer Louie Sampana on May 2, 2023.

== Verbal harassment controversy ==
In 2014, Rosselyn Domingo and her boyfriend Alvin Campomanes, a history professor from the University of the Philippines, who played as bit players in the teleseries Forevermore, accused Molina, talent supplier John Leonardo and a woman named "Jeng" of mistreatment of their extra. Domingo points that Molina allegedly spoke expletives and humiliated her and Campomanes during a taping of the drama series shot in Benguet. The open letter of Domingo with a complaint of Campomanes addressed to Cory Vidanes, ABS-CBN's COO, originally posted on Facebook on December 31, 2015. Film director Peque Gallaga backed the two talent's testimonies against Molina.

Molina, admitted in an interview with TV host Boy Abunda that she cursed the two "extras" during a taping with "good intentions" and asked for a dialogue between her and the two complainants to settle the issue.

== Casting ==
Molina often casts certain actors more than once in her films. She has consistently worked with Kathryn Bernardo, Alden Richards, Bea Alonzo, Sarah Geronimo, Toni Gonzaga, Daniel Padilla, Sam Milby and John Lloyd Cruz.

Actor	Bcuz of U (2004)	Close to You (2006)	You Are the One (2006)	You Got Me! (2007)	One More Chance (2007)	A Very Special Love (2008)	My Only Ü (2008)	You Changed My Life (2009)	Miss You Like Crazy (2010)	Cinco (2010)	My Amnesia Girl (2010)	Forever and a Day (2011)	ÜnOfficially Yours (2012)	It Takes A Man And A Woman (2013)	Four Sisters and a Wedding (2013)	She's Dating the Gangster (2014)	A Second Chance (2015)	Just the 3 of Us (2016)	My Ex and Whys (2017)	Seven Sundays (2017)	Unexpectedly Yours (2017)	My Perfect You (2018)	The Hows of Us (2018)	Three Words to Forever (2018)	Hello, Love, Goodbye (2019)	Hello, Love, Again (2024)
Sandara Park	check																									
Hero Angeles	check																									
Bea Alonzo		check			check				check						check		^{5}									
KC Concepcion												check														
John Lloyd Cruz		check			check	check	^{1}	^{2}	check		check		check	^{2}			^{5}	check								
Sarah Geronimo						check		^{2}						^{2}												
Toni Gonzaga			check	check			check				check				check											
Angel Locsin											^{3}		check		check											
Vhong Navarro							check																			
Zanjoe Marudo				check						check																
Pokwang										check																
Sam Milby		check	check	check								check			check											
Enchong Dee															check											
Shaina Magdayao															check											
Kathryn Bernardo																check							check	check	check	check
Daniel Padilla																check							check			
Dawn Zulueta																^{4}										
Richard Gomez																^{4}								check		
Jennylyn Mercado																		check								
Liza Soberano																			check							
Enrique Gil																			check	check						
Aga Muhlach																				check						
Cristine Reyes																				check						
Dingdong Dantes																				check						
Ronaldo Valdez																				check						
Sharon Cuneta																					check			check		
Robin Padilla																					check					
Julia Barretto																					check					
Joshua Garcia																					check					
Pia Wurtzbach																						check				
Gerald Anderson																						check				
Alden Richards																									check	check

Notes

- ^{1} Cruz made a cameo appearance in My Only Ü.
- ^{2} Cruz and Geronimo reprised their roles as Miggy Montenegro and Laida Magtalas.
- ^{3} Locsin made a cameo appearance in My Amnesia Girl.
- ^{4} Zulueta and Gomez made a special participation in She's Dating the Gangster and considered as the main cast of the film because of taking the role of adult version of Bernardo and Padilla.
- ^{5} Cruz and Alonzo reprised their roles as "Popoy" and "Basha".

== Filmography ==
=== Film ===
Year	Film	Role	Notes and Awards
1993	Bulag, Pipi at Bingi	Assistant director	
1993	Maricris Sioson: Japayuki	Assistant director	
1994	Maalaala Mo Kaya: The Movie	Assistant director	
1994	Separada	Assistant director	
1995	Patayin sa Sindak si Barbara	Assistant director, post-production coordinator	
1995	Basta't Kasama Kita	Assistant director	
1995	Eskapo	Assistant director, crowd director	
1996	Madrasta	Assistant director	
1996	Mara Clara: The Movie	Assistant director	
1997	Hanggang Kailan Kita Mamahalin?	Assistant director	
1997	Paano Ang Puso Ko?	Assistant director	
1998	Bata, Bata... Pa'no Ka Ginawa?/Lea's Story	Assistant director	
1998	Magandang Hatinggabi	Associate director	
2000	Minsan, Minahal Kita	Associate director	
2002	Got 2 Believe	Associate director	
2004	Milan	Associate director	
2004	Bcuz of U	Director	Episode "Third Story"
2006	Close to You	Director	
2006	You Are the One	Director	Nominated—PMPC Star Award for Movie Director of the Year
2007	You Got Me!	Director	
2007	One More Chance	Director	GMMSF Box-Office Entertainment Award for Film Director of the Year; PMPC Star Award for Movie Director of the Year
2008	A Very Special Love	Director	GMMSF Box-Office Entertainment Award for Film Director of the Year; Nominated—ENPRESS Golden Screen Award for Best Director; Nominated—FAP Luna Award for Best Director; Nominated—PMPC Star Award for Movie Director of the Year
2008	My Only Ü	Director	
2009	You Changed My Life	Director	GMMSF Box-Office Entertainment Award for Film Director of the Year; Nominated—ENPRESS Golden Screen Award for Best Director
2009	In My Life	Second associate director	
2010	Miss You Like Crazy	Director	
2010	Cinco	Director	Episode "Puso"
2010	My Amnesia Girl	Director	
2011	Forever and a Day	Director	
2012	ÜnOfficially Yours	Director	
2013	It Takes a Man and a Woman	Director	
2013	Four Sisters and a Wedding	Director	
2014	She's Dating the Gangster	Director	
2015	A Second Chance	Director	
2016	Just the 3 of Us	Director	
2017	My Ex and Whys	Director	
2017	Seven Sundays	Director	
2017	Unexpectedly Yours	Director	
2018	My Perfect You	Director	
2018	The Hows of Us	Director	
2018	Three Words to Forever	Director, screenwriter, and story writer	
2019	Hello, Love, Goodbye	Director and screenwriter	2020 Asian Academy Creative Awards for Best Feature Film, Best Director and Best Original Screenplay; GMMSF Box-Office Entertainment Award for Film Director of the Year and Best Screenplay with Carmi Raymudo and Rona Go; PMPC Star Awards for Movie of the Year, Best Director and Movie Screenwriter of the Year with Carmi and Rona Go; Nominated—Australian Academy Awards for Cinema and Television Awards for Best Asian Films
2021	Love at First Stream	Director and writer	
2022	Partners in Crime	Director	
2024	Hello, Love, Again	Director	
2025	Meet, Greet & Bye	Director	
2026	Tayo sa Wakas	Director	
2026	Always Yours, Never Mine	Director	

=== Television ===
Year	Title	Role	Notes
1999–2001	Marinella	2nd Director	
2001–2002	Sa Puso Ko, Iingatan Ka	2nd Director	
2002–2009	Maalaala Mo Kaya	Director	6 episodes
2006	Wansapanataym	Director	Episode "Ang Alamat ng Pinya"
2008	Lobo	Director	
2009	Precious Hearts Romances Presents: Bud Brothers	Director	
2009	Precious Hearts Romances Presents: Somewhere in My Heart	Director	
2010	Precious Hearts Romances Presents: Midnight Phantom	Director	
2010	Precious Hearts Romances Presents: Alyna	Director	
2013–2014	Got to Believe	Director	
2014	Pinoy Big Brother: All In	Houseguest/Herself/Director	Directed the short film Endless (starring the Housemates)
2014–2015	Forevermore	Director	
2015	Pangako Sa 'Yo	Director	Two Weeks Only
2016	Dolce Amore	Director	
2016	The Story of Us	Director	
2017	La Luna Sangre	Director	Pilot Week Only
2022	My Papa Pi	Director	
2023	Can’t Buy Me Love	Director	
2026	The Loyalty Game	Co-director	

=== Cameo appearances ===
Year	Film	Role
1990	Bikining Itim	Tale
1990	Biktima	Rape victim
1990	Inosente	Young Hostess
1995	Basta't Kasama Kita	Chambermaid
2004	Milan	Pinoy 1
2009	In My Life	Ballroom host
2016	Barcelona: A Love Untold	Director
2019	Hello, Love, Goodbye	Buyer
2026	Unang Kilig	Herself

== Awards and nominations ==
Year	Award-Giving Body	Category	Work	Result
2007	23rd PMPC Star Awards for Movies	Movie Director of the Year	You Are the One	Nominated
2008	38th GMMSF Box-Office Entertainment Awards	Most Popular Film Director	One More Chance	Won
2008	24th PMPC Star Awards for Movies	Movie Director of the Year	One More Chance	Won
2009	39th GMMSF Box-Office Entertainment Awards	Most Popular Film Director	A Very Special Love	Won
2009	27th FAP Luna Awards	Best Director	A Very Special Love	Nominated
2009	6th Golden Screen Awards for Movies	Best Director	A Very Special Love	Nominated
2009	25th PMPC Star Awards for Movies	Movie Director of the Year	A Very Special Love	Nominated
2010	40th GMMSF Box-Office Entertainment Awards	Most Popular Film Director	You Changed My Life	Won
2010	7th Golden Screen Awards for Movies	Best Director	You Changed My Life	Nominated
2011	59th FAMAS Awards	Best Director	Miss You Like Crazy	Nominated
2014	62nd FAMAS Awards	Best Director	Four Sisters and a Wedding	Nominated
2014	30th PMPC Star Awards for Movies	Movie Director of the Year	Four Sisters and a Wedding; It Takes a Man and a Woman	Nominated
2015	63rd FAMAS Awards	Best Director	She's Dating the Gangster	Nominated
2016	47th GMMSF Box-Office Entertainment Awards	Most Popular Director	A Second Chance	Won
2019	50th GMMSF Box-Office Entertainment Awards	Most Popular Film Director	The Hows of Us	Won
