= Unexpectedly Yours =

- Theatrical Poster
- Directed by: Cathy Garcia-Molina
- Screenplay by: Anna Karenina Ramos; Janica Mae Regalo
- Story by: Vanessa R. Valdez; Kiko C. Abrillo
- Produced by: Charo Santos-Concio; Malou N. Santos
- Starring: Sharon Cuneta; Robin Padilla; Julia Barretto; Joshua Garcia
- Cinematography: Manuel Teehankee
- Edited by: Marya Ignacio
- Music by: Jessie Lasaten
- Production company: Star Cinema
- Distributed by: Star Cinema
- Release date: November 29, 2017
- Running time: 120 minutes
- Country: Philippines
- Language: Filipino
- Box office: ₱249 million

Unexpectedly Yours is a 2017 Philippine romantic comedy film directed by Cathy Garcia-Molina from a story written by Vanessa R. Valdez and Kiko C. Abrillo and adapted into a screenplay by Anna Karenina Ramos and Janica Mae Regalo, with additional script inputs by the preceding three. Starring Sharon Cuneta, Joshua Garcia, Julia Barretto and Robin Padilla, the film tells the story of two former friends from high school unexpectedly became neighbors, one of whom has secret feelings with her.

Produced and distributed by Star Cinema, the film was theatrically released in the Philippines on November 29, 2017. The film marks the reunion of Cuneta and Padilla in the big-screen after 16 years since they last paired together in Viva Films' Pagdating ng Panahon in 2001, and the third film of the loveteam between Barretto and Garcia.

== Cast ==
=== Main cast ===
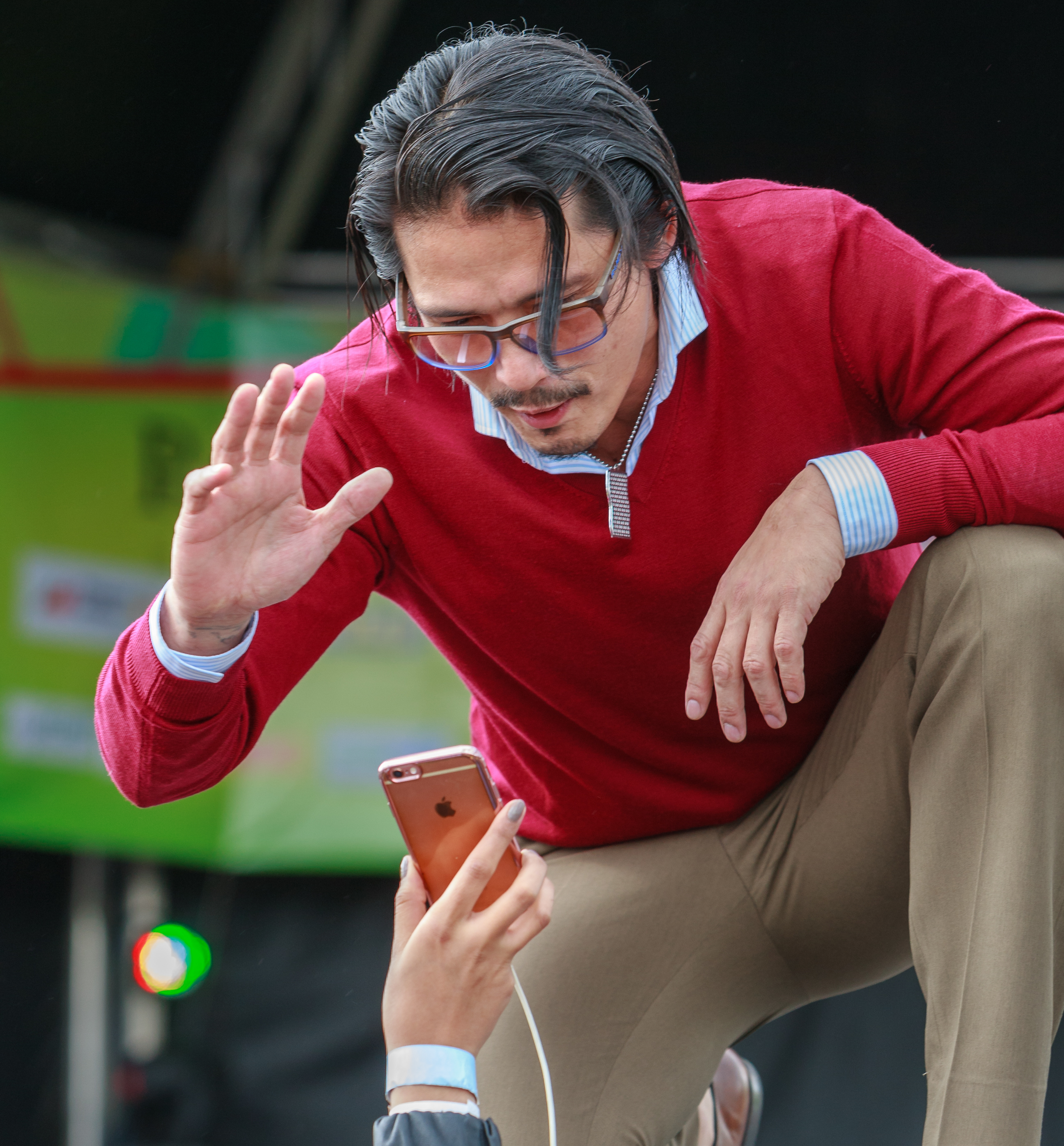
Robin Padilla portrays Francisco "Cocoy" Manlangit.

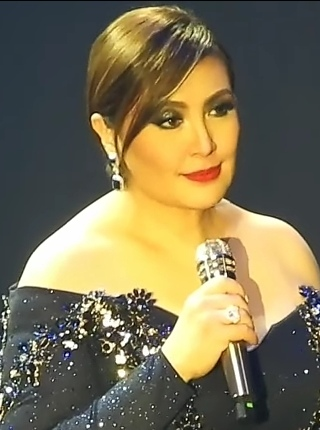
Sharon Cuneta portrays Patricia Rose "Patty" Ignacio-Gonzales.

Joshua Garcia portrays Jason Manlangit.

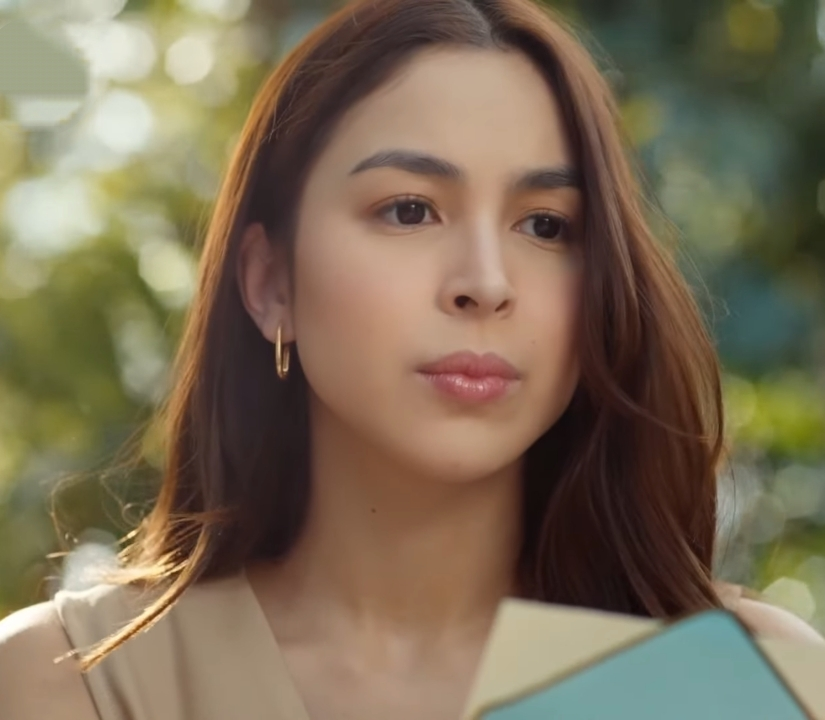
Julia Barretto portrays Yanni Gonzales.

- Sharon Cuneta as Patricia Rose "Patty" Ignacio-Gonzales
- Robin Padilla as Francisco "Cocoy" Manlangit
- Julia Barretto as Yanni Gonzales
- Joshua Garcia as Jason Manlangit

=== Supporting cast ===
- Maritoni Fernandez as Rachelle
- Yayo Aguila as Lulu
- Marina Benipayo as Cherie
- Marissa Delgado as Mila
- Carmi Martin as Elena
- Toby Alejar as Doc
- Denise Joaquin as Angie
- Pamu Pamorada as Eunice
- Minnie Aguilar as Yaya
- Hyubs Azarcon as Ferdie
- Philip Lazaro as Philip
- MJ Lastimosa as Liz

=== Special participation ===
- John Estrada as Yael Gonzales
- Pilar Pilapil as Catalina Ignacio
- Maxene Magalona as Georgina
- Jameson Blake as Kurt
- Ruben Maria Soriquez as Mr. Ricardo

== Release ==
Unexpectedly Yours was released on November 29, 2017, in Philippine cinemas. The film was graded "A" by the Cinema Evaluation Board of the Philippines. It earned ₱14 million on its premiere. and ₱100 million on December 5, 2017.

=== Box office ===
Initially, the film was released on November 29, 2017, in 200 cinemas. Unexpectedly Yours grossed ₱14 million on its first day of showing. After three days, the film grossed ₱50 million. After six days, the film grossed ₱100 million. After 12 days, the film grossed ₱157 million. On its 19th day, the film grossed ₱218 million worldwide. On its 23rd day, the film grossed ₱249 million worldwide at the box office.

== See also ==
- List of films produced and released by Star Cinema
