= Forever and a Day (2011 film) =

- Theatrical movie poster
- Directed by: Cathy Garcia-Molina
- Screenplay by: Melissa Mae Chua; Carmi G. Raymundo
- Story by: Melissa Mae Chua
- Produced by: Charo Santos-Concio; Malou N. Santos
- Starring: Sam Milby; KC Concepcion
- Cinematography: Dan Villegas
- Edited by: Marya Ignacio
- Music by: Cesar Francis S. Concio
- Production company: Star Cinema
- Distributed by: Star Cinema
- Release date: June 15, 2011
- Running time: 105 minutes
- Country: Philippines
- Language: Filipino
- Box office: ₱44.7 million

Forever and a Day is a 2011 Filipino romance film starring Sam Milby and KC Concepcion. The film was released by Star Cinema. The film premiered on June 15, 2011.

== Plot ==
Eugene (Sam Milby) arrives in Bukidnon with only one intention: to forget his problems at work. But when he meets Raffy (KC Concepcion) and as they travel and go on ridiculous and death-defying activities together, they start to form a friendship that goes beyond Eugene’s original plan. Raffy helps Eugene appreciate himself more and to look at things in a positive way. With Raffy, Eugene begins to believe in himself again. Soon, against his own expectations, he admits to himself that has fallen in love with this girl.

But life is truly ironic. The moment Eugene expresses his feelings for her, Raffy suddenly starts to push him away. She admits that he can never have her, and she doesn’t want Eugene to hope for a happy ending with her, because she cannot be loved.

Now, it is Eugene’s turn to make Raffy believe in love again, just as how she reminded him to believe in himself. But is faith enough to change the course of their destiny? And is his love strong enough for him to sacrifice everything for a relationship that will not last, and for a girl who will leave him soon?

== Cast ==
- Sam Milby as Eugene
- KC Concepcion as Raffy
- Rayver Cruz as Miko
- Bembol Roco as Gerry
- Dante Rivero as Tatang
- Vivian Velez as Ellen
- Matet de Leon as Cam
- Spanky Manikan as Eugene's dad
- Bing Pimentel as Eugene's mom
- Lui Villaruz as Tupe
- Robin Da Rosa as Eugene's brother
- Helga Krapf as Eugene's sister
- Nikki Valdez as Steff
- Janet Dangcalan as Melinda

== Production ==
=== Location ===
The film was shot in the cities of Iligan and Cagayan de Oro and the province of Bukidnon in the Philippines (three of them belong to Northern Mindanao).

=== Music ===
Sam Milby recorded a cover of "All My Life" which was originally sung by America which is used as the film's theme song. A music video were released on Star Cinema's official YouTube account.

== Reception ==
=== Launch ===
The film's teaser was released on May 11, 2011 before the showing of the also Star Cinema produced, In The Name of Love.

=== Box Office ===
The film achieved moderate success. The film opened its first week with a P23 million gross receipts, according to Box Office Mojo. Its total gross is P44.73M.

== Awards ==
Year	Film Award/Critics	Category	Result
2012	30th Luna Awards	Best Actress (KC Concepcion)	Nominated
2012	30th Luna Awards	Best Editing (Marya Ignacio)	Nominated
2012	30th Luna Awards	Best Musical Score (Cesar Francis Concio)	Nominated
