= You Got Me! =

- Theatrical film poster
- Directed by: Cathy Garcia-Molina
- Written by: Raz de la Torre; Francis Bryan Lua
- Produced by: Charo Santos-Concio; Malou N. Santos
- Starring: Toni Gonzaga; Sam Milby; Zanjoe Marudo
- Cinematography: Manuel Teehankee
- Edited by: Marya Ignacio
- Music by: Raul Mitra
- Production company: Star Cinema
- Release date: February 28, 2007 (Philippines)
- Running time: 103 minutes (Philippines); 125 minutes (United States)
- Country: Philippines
- Languages: Filipino (Philippines); English (United States)

You Got Me! is a 2007 Filipino romantic comedy film that tells a love story between three people: the strong aggressive police woman played by actress-host Toni Gonzaga, the shy-type police man played by actor-singer Sam Milby and the bad boy played by model-actor Zanjoe Marudo. It was produced by Star Cinema, ABS-CBN Film Productions. This is the second film to feature Milby and Gonzaga after You Are the One (2006), Distributed by Nu Image Films released on November 1, 2006 (USA)

== Plot ==
Insp.Amor "Moe" Santander (Toni Gonzaga) is a tough chick who's used to going after crooks. But there's also one thing she's running away from ever since her mother died: falling in love. Insp.Kevin Robles (Sam Milby) is daunted by most things, but most especially coming clean with the girl he's been loving from afar for a time now. Meanwhile, Caloy (Zanjoe Marudo) is a counterfeit DVD vendor whom Moe captures, along with his heart. Things get complicated when Caloy enlists Kevin's help to win Moe, just when Moe and Kevin's friendship gets deeper. Who does Moe really love? Will she even surrender to her feelings in the first place? Suddenly her life as one of the best performers in the service suffers.

== Cast and characters ==
=== Main cast ===
- Toni Gonzaga as Amor Santander/Moe
- Sam Milby as Kevin Robles/PX
- Zanjoe Marudo as Caloy

=== Supporting cast ===
- Johnny Delgado† as Allan Santander
- Dick Israel† as Glenn Ricafort
- AJ Dee as Francis Villanueva
- Jayson Gainza as Rene
- Pia Moran as Mother of Caloy
- Quintin Alianza as Brother of Caloy
- Pinky Amador as Mother of Kevin
- Toby Alejar as Dad of Kevin
- Nuel C. Naval as Syndicate Big Boss
- Marco Morales as SWAT (uncredited)
- January Isaac as Young Mom of Moe

== Soundtrack ==
- "My Eyes Adored You"
  Written by Bob Crewe and Kenny Nolan
  Performed by Toni Gonzaga and Sam Milby

(Philippines)

- "Incomplete"
  Performed by Sisqó
- "I Believe I Can Fly"
  Written by R. Kelly
  Performed by R. Kelly
- "12 Play"
  Performed by R. Kelly
