= RJ Ledesma =

Filipino television host and businessman (born 1974)

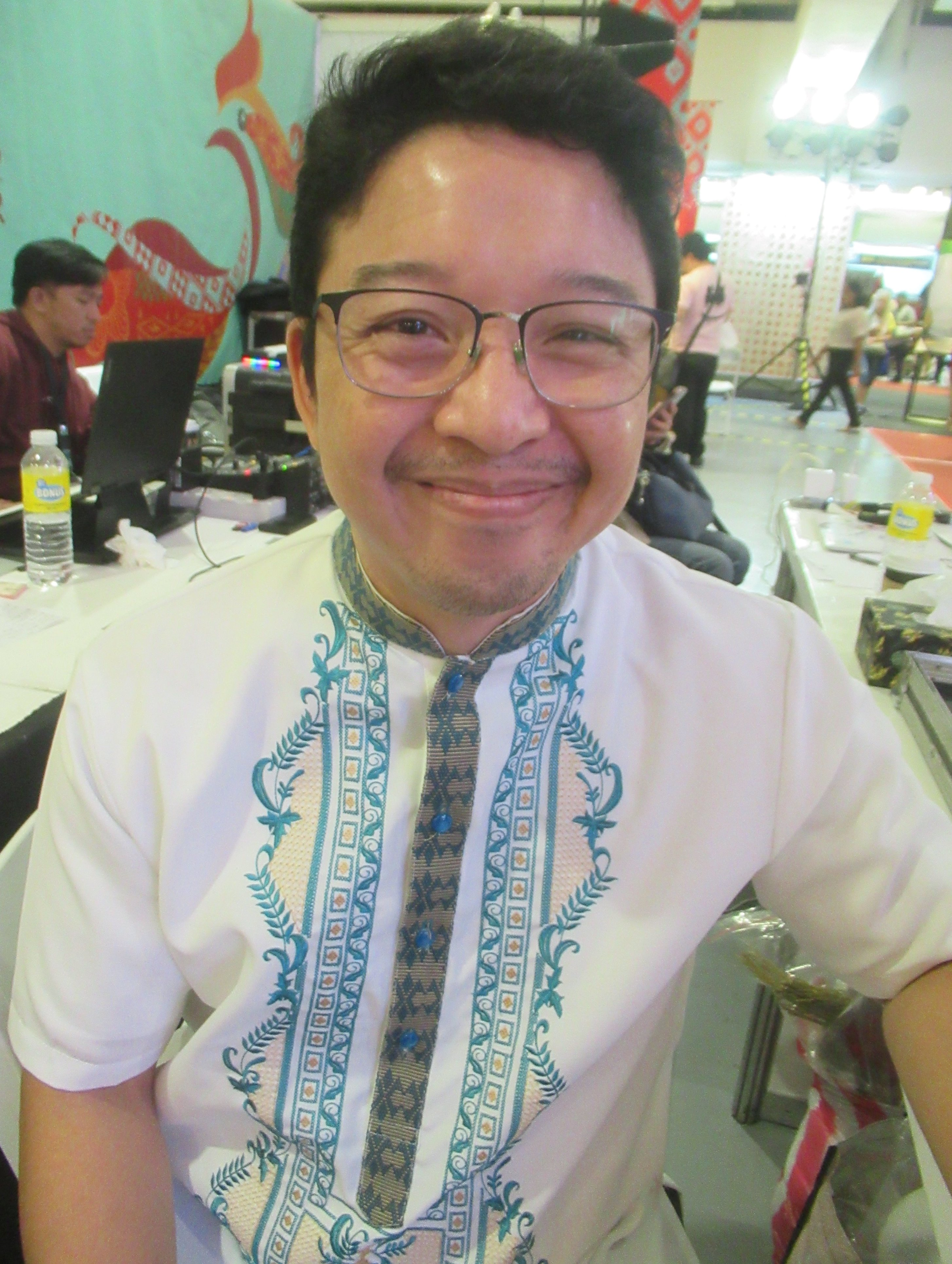
- Ledesma in 2024
- Born: Rene Aleta Ledesma, Jr. June 10, 1974 (age 52)
- Years active: 1980s–
- Notable work: Portrayal of "Joey" in Royal Tru TVCs (1988–1992)
- Spouse: Vanessa Pastor (m. 2008)
- Children: 3

Rene "RJ" Aleta Ledesma, Jr. (born June 10, 1974) is a Filipino television host and businessman. He is also a former teenage actor known for appearing in Royal Tru commercials in the Philippines in the late 1980s.

== Early life and education ==
RJ Ledesma was born on June 10, 1974. His father Rene Locsin Ledesma is a real estate businessman while his mother is Fortune Aleta, a former beauty queen, commercial model, and eye doctor. RJ is the eldest of three children.

Ledesma studied at La Salle Green Hills in Mandaluyong for basic education, then at De La Salle University in Manila for college. He graduated with a bachelor's degree in business management in 1995. He later attended the Massachusetts Institute of Technology in the United States.

== Career ==
=== Television and film ===
Ledesma started his entertainment industry career as a commercial actor playing the role of Joey for commercials of Royal Tru which aired from 1988 to 1991. He auditioned for the role. Lino Brocka directed Ledesma's first soda commercial. He was also able to work with other directors such as Ishmael Bernal, Peque Gallaga, and Jun Urbano. A total 15 commercials was produced which aired from 1988 to 1992.

After his appearances in the Royal Tru commercials. Ledesma appeared in GMA Network's Teen Talk with Beatriz Lucero Lhuillier in from 1993 to 1995.

He took a hiatus from the industry to take up a job as a brand manager of Ivory Soap and Shampoo for Procter & Gamble where he worked until 1999. Under that capacity. He commissioned Urbano to direct commercials for his employer.

Ledesma returned to television as part of ABS-CBN's Alas Singko Y Medya Weekend Edition which started airing in 1999 as host with Mon Ilagan and Cheryl Cosim and later Magandang Umaga, Bayan Weekend for two years.

Ledesma hosted and produced the late-night adult show The Men’s Room at Studio 23 in 2004. He was also hosting Tahanang Pinoy of ABC-5.

He is the host of Bright Ideas of One News which features startups and other business concepts as well as the eponymous The RJ Ledesma Podcast which are made available in various social media and other online platforms.

Aside from hosting, Ledesma also did cameos and supporting roles in various television series and films such as Magkaribal, My Perfect You, and Bride for Rent.

=== Writing ===
Ledesma is a columnist for The Philippine Star' with his section named "Pogi from a Parallel Universe". He authored at least five books, the editor-in-chief of Uno Magazine, and head The Business Manual online subscription platform of One Mega Group.

=== Business ===
Ledesma was involved in establishing food business incubator Mercato Centrale, EnterPH which is a consultancy for foreign firms aspiring to enter the Philippine market, and Easy Franchise which assist businesses on franchising. He also heads the Filipino Homes real estate firm.

== Personal life ==
Ledesma married Vanessa Pastor in 2008. They have three children. The couple first met in De La Salle but later met again at the Single Young Adults church group when Ledesma was hosting The Men’s Room.
