= My Only Ü =

2008 romantic black comedy film by Cathy Garcia-Molina

- Theatrical movie poster
- Directed by: Cathy Garcia-Molina
- Screenplay by: John Roque; Tanya Bautista
- Story by: Emmanuel Dela Cruz; Chinno B. Marquez; John Roque; Tanya Bautista
- Produced by: Charo Santos-Concio; Malou N. Santos
- Starring: Toni Gonzaga; Vhong Navarro
- Cinematography: Manuel Teehankee
- Edited by: Marya Ignacio
- Music by: Jessie Lasaten
- Production company: Star Cinema
- Distributed by: ABS-CBN Film Productions
- Release date: October 29, 2008
- Running time: 110 minutes
- Country: Philippines
- Language: Filipino

My Only Ü is a 2008 Filipino romantic black comedy film directed by Cathy Garcia-Molina and written by John Roque and Tanya Bautista from a story concept they co-developed with Emmanuel B. Dela Cruz and Chinno B. Marquez. The film stars Vhong Navarro and Toni Gonzaga, in their second film together, with the supporting cast including Benjie Paras, Janus del Prado, Dennis Padilla, and Empoy Marquez.

Produced and distributed by ABS-CBN Film Productions, the film was released on October 29, 2008.

== Plot ==
Bong (Vhong Navarro) has liked Winona (Toni Gonzaga) since time immemorial, but he never dared to pursue her. Winona, on the other hand, seems to be showing interest in Bong, but he is too insensible to notice this. One day, in the tenement Bong is managing for his aunt Lolit, he receives the final notes from the recently deceased neighborhood Doctor. Panying, Doc's assistant, hands Bong his results and hands out Winona's. He checks out his letter and sees that the results are all negative. Bong is very healthy

However, as he opens Winona's envelope, fear drowns him because he knows about the so-called curse that all the women in Winona's family die before 25. Her mother died after giving birth at the age of 24, her older brother died of bangungot at age 21, her maternal aunt disappeared during Martial Law at 23, her grandmother died during World War II at age 20, her great-grandmother is said to have died of drowning at age 18, her great-great-grandmother died of malaria at age 22, and her ancestor was devoured by a dinosaur at age 19. Bong is aware that Winona is turning 25 soon, and this letter might just confirm that curse. He opens the letter and sees the result. It is positive. Winona has lupus, and she will die soon. Bong vows to make Winona's last remaining days happy and perfect. Bong goes through the whole montage of making life blissful for Winona. Winona and Bong become a lot closer to each other. They begin to fall in love.

When Winona turned 25, she didn't die. She found the letter sent by the hospital. She discovered then that her results were all negative. She got mad because Bong has been keeping it a secret ever since. Bong tried to apologize. But when Winona rejected his apology, he fainted and was hospitalized. At that time, Winona was so worried that he took care of Bong. But one day he found out that he had a rare lung disease. At first, he was sad, but he became happy thinking that if Winona were to die, he could die with her. As he was trying to tell Winona the 'good news', Winona was so happy and told him that she was not dying. The Doctor's assistant made a mistake with his notes. Winona was devastated after knowing that Bong was dying.

But despite all of this, Winona proposed to Bong. They died in a car accident after their marriage.

== Cast and characters ==
=== Main cast ===
- Toni Gonzaga as Winona Benigno Aunor
- Vhong Navarro as Bonganvilla/Bong

=== Supporting cast ===
- Janus del Prado as Ngorks
- Beauty Gonzalez as Marge
- Kitkat as Sheryll
- Vangie Labalan as Tita Lolit
- Julius 'Empoy' Marquez as Romnick
- Arlene Muhlach as Delia
- Dennis Padilla as Raul
- Benjie Paras as Doc Hector D. Doctor
- Ronnie Magsanoc
- John Lloyd Cruz as imaginary character
- Sam Milby
- Zanjoe Marudo
