= Three Words to Forever =

2018 film by Cathy Garcia-Molina

- Theatrical movie poster
- Directed by: Cathy Garcia-Molina
- Written by: Vanessa R. Valdez; Anna Karenina Ramos; Kiko C. Abrillo
- Produced by: Carlo L. Katigbak; Olivia M. Lamasan
- Starring: Richard Gomez; Sharon Cuneta; Kathryn Bernardo
- Cinematography: Louie Sampana
- Edited by: Marya Ignacio
- Music by: Jessie Q. Lasaten
- Production company: Star Cinema
- Distributed by: ABS-CBN Film Productions
- Release date: November 28, 2018
- Running time: 106 minutes
- Country: Philippines
- Languages: Filipino; English
- Box office: ₱103.5 million (domestic)

Three Words to Forever is a 2018 Philippine family romantic comedy-drama film directed by Cathy Garcia-Molina from a story and screenplay written by Vanessa R. Valdez, Anna Karenina Ramos, and Kiko C. Abrillo. The film stars Richard Gomez, Sharon Cuneta and Kathryn Bernardo, with the supporting cast include Liza Lorena, Freddie Webb, and Joross Gamboa.

Produced and distributed by Star Cinema, it was released theatrically on November 28, 2018.

== Cast ==
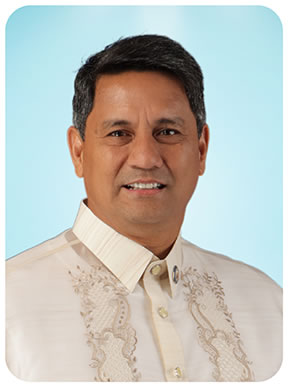
Richard Gomez portrays Rick Andrada.

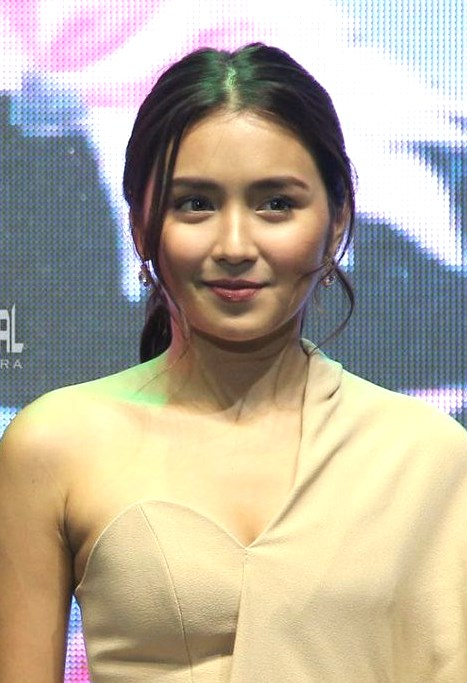
Kathryn Bernardo portrays Tin Andrada.

- Richard Gomez as Rick Andrada
- Sharon Cuneta as Cristy Andrada
- Kathryn Bernardo as Christina Andrada
- Tommy Esguerra as Kyle
- Liza Lorena as Tinay Andrada
- Freddie Webb as Cito Andrada
- Joross Gamboa as Paeng
- Hyubs Azarcon
- Marnie Lapus
- Tobie Dela Cruz
- Cheska Iñigo as Kyle's Mom
- Carla Humphries as Nicole

== Theme song ==
- The official theme song of the film is Show Me a Smile by the TNT Boys for the first version and Sharon Cuneta for the second version (originally performed by Apo Hiking Society). The song also serves as the official opening and main theme song for the action-drama series, The Master Cutter, which premiered on May 11, 2026 on GMA Network.
