= My Perfect You =

2018 romantic comedy-drama film by Cathy Garcia-Molina

- Theatrical Release Poster
- Directed by: Cathy Garcia-Molina
- Screenplay by: Kristine C. Gabriel; Carmi G. Raymundo; Cathy Garcia-Molina
- Story by: Carmi G. Raymundo
- Produced by: Charo Santos-Concio; Malou N. Santos; Carlo L. Katigbak; Olivia M. Lamasan
- Starring: Gerald Anderson; Pia Wurtzbach
- Cinematography: Noel Teehankee
- Edited by: Marya Ignacio
- Music by: Jessie Q. Lasaten
- Production company: ABS-CBN Film Productions
- Distributed by: Star Cinema
- Release date: March 14, 2018
- Running time: 121 minutes
- Country: Philippines
- Languages: Filipino (primary); English (secondary)
- Box office: ₱136 million

My Perfect You is a 2018 Philippine romantic drama film directed by Cathy Garcia-Molina from a story and screenplay written by Carmi G. Raymundo, with Molina and Kristine C. Gabriel as co-writers of the latter. The film stars Gerald Anderson and Pia Wurtzbach and tells the story of a man who's down in the dumps and a woman who helps him see the light again. The supporting cast includes Dimples Romana, Tonton Gutierrez, Janus del Prado, and Wilma Doesnt.

Produced and distributed by Star Cinema, the film was theatrically released on March 14, 2018.

== Plot ==
Burn Toledo loses control of his life after his marriage proposal is rejected by his girlfriend Angel and he is fired from his job. He drives to a remote place and crashes his car. He ends up at Happy Sunshine Camp, where he meets the owner, Abi. He instantly forms a dislike towards her due to her perky demeanor as all-around worker in the remote resort. Burn soon apologizes for his rash and awful behavior and with the help of Bubut, Handres and Lucky, helps restore the resort to its former glory as payment for his debt. He begins to form a bond with Abi as he spends more time with her.

In reality, Burn is revealed to have developed schizophrenia after sustaining head injuries due to the accident. He is treated by his doctor and friend Aris who informed Burn's father Roel and his older sister Ellaine about his condition. Roel refuses to allow his son to be treated since his wife died of the same illness. Burn has psychotic episodes towards his father when he angrily attempts to snap him out of reality, indicating that Abi, the Happy Sunshine Camp, and the people in it are imaginary.

During the re-opening of Happy Sunshine Camp, Burn finally faces the reality that Abi, her friends, and the people whom they called their first visitors in the resort are imaginary. In the real world, he is rescued by Ellaine from drowning in the bathtub the whole time. Burn's mental condition continues to worsen, convincing Roel to have Aris treat his son. As Burn is being treated, his memories of Abi and her friends begin to fade. Burn finally says goodbye to Abi, and they part ways. Burn recovers from his illness after six months of treatment and reunites with his family.

One day while spending time with his family, Ellaine tells him to meet a certain person at a coffee shop. On the way, Burn sees two other people who look like the same people he met at the Happy Sunshine Camp. At the coffee shop, meets the barista Bie, who looks exactly like Abi. Since Burn's memory of Abi has been erased, he does not remember her but looks familiar to him. Burn finally introduces himself to Bie and he smiles, happy to meet her in person.

== Cast ==
=== Main cast ===
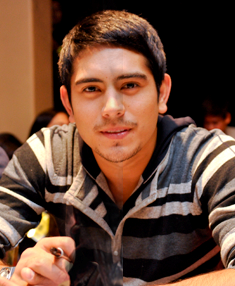
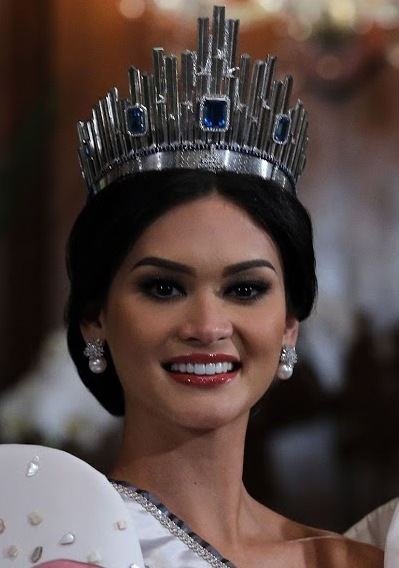
Gerald Anderson (pictured in 2010) and Pia Wurtzbach (pictured in 2015) respectively played the roles of Burn Toledo and Abi/Abie "Bie" Marie Garcia-Molina.
- Gerald Anderson as Burn Toledo
- Pia Wurtzbach as Abi/Abie "Bie" Marie Garcia-Molina

=== Supporting cast ===
- Dimples Romana as Ellaine Toledo
- Tonton Gutierrez as Roel Toledo
- Janus Del Prado as Handres
- Wilma Doesnt as Bubut
- Darwin Tolentino as Lucky
- RJ Ledesma as Aris
- Xia Vigor as Tetet ( Voice Dubbed by Anamika Scribe)
- Paolo O'Hara as Mr. Ledesma
- Marlann Flores as Angel

== Production ==
On January 18, 2018, Star Cinema announced that Pia Wurtzbach is set to do a new film with Gerald Anderson after her successful MMFF film Gandarrapiddo: The Revenger Squad with Vice Ganda and Daniel Padilla. It was announced Thursday shortly after a story conference where the lead stars were in attendance. The film will be helmed by box-office director Cathy Garcia-Molina.

The filming started on January 25, 2018. Anderson and Wurtzbach were spotted in Kidz Pool Resort at Sitio Coto, Masinloc, Zambales where the film was taken.

On March 2, 2018, Star Cinema finally released the official theatrical trailer and poster of My Perfect You.

== Release ==
My Perfect You premiered in Philippine cinemas on March 14, 2018. Released in 200 Cinemas earning 10 million on its opening day. It is also released on some selected countries.

=== Critical response ===
Oggs Cruz of Rappler stated "Director Cathy Garcia-Molina is currently the Philippines' foremost crafter of escapist fantasies.

She, however, doesn't peddle her works as portraits of possible realities. She's aware that her stories are diversions to the drastically harsher lives of her film's audience, populating her perfect love stories with women who are obviously wearing outrageous wigs, seemingly in an effort to highlight the fact that nothing in the films' fairy tale endings can be farther from the truth.

My Perfect You appears to be the strangest in Garcia-Molina's filmography, even stranger than My Only Ü (2008), which had the characters played by Vhong Navarro and Toni Gonzaga commit to a romance even in the afterlife.

What makes My Perfect You stand out is how it isn't exactly a love story but an examination of Burn, played excellently by Gerald Anderson, a man desperate for an escape from the many problems that ail his life. The film opens with him running away from his family, hurriedly driving to an unknown destination until he swerves into a ravine trying to avoid hitting a pedestrian who suddenly appears in the middle of the road. He gets out of his damaged car and finds himself in a decrepit resort managed by overeager and endlessly optimistic Abi, played by surprisingly soulful Miss Universe winner-turned-actress Pia Wurtzbach."
