= Unofficially Yours =

ÜnOfficially Yours
- Theatrical film poster
- Directed by: Cathy Garcia-Molina
- Written by: Juan Miguel Sevilla
- Produced by: Charo Santos-Concio; Malou N. Santos
- Starring: John Lloyd Cruz; Angel Locsin
- Cinematography: Dan Villegas
- Edited by: Marya Ignacio
- Music by: Cesar Francis Concio
- Production company: Star Cinema
- Distributed by: ABS-CBN Film Productions
- Release date: February 15, 2012 (Philippines)
- Running time: 106 minutes
- Country: Philippines
- Language: Filipino
- Box office: ₱157,254,200.00

Unofficially Yours (stylized as ÜnOfficially Yours) is a 2012 Filipino romantic comedy film directed by Cathy Garcia-Molina from a story and screenplay written by Juan Miguel Sevilla. The film stars John Lloyd Cruz and Angel Locsin, with a supporting cast includes Edgar Mortiz, Tetchie Agbayani and Edgar Allan Guzman.

Produced and distributed by ABS-CBN Film Productions, the film was released theatrically in the Philippines on February 15, 2012, and became the third-highest-grossing Filipino film of that year.

== Synopsis ==
Macky Galvez is a depressed young man recovering from a failed relationship. One night, Galvez meets Ces Bricenio, a modern-day beautiful girl who is afraid of commitment, and they have a one-night stand. Later on, Macky meets Ces again in his new job as a reporter for the Manila Bulletin.

== Cast ==
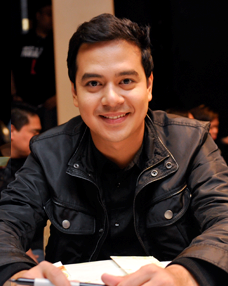
John Lloyd Cruz portrays Dr. Mackie Galvez, DMD.

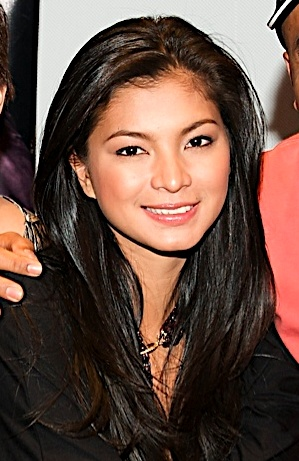
Angel Locsin portrays Princess "Ces" Bricenio.

- John Lloyd Cruz as Dr. Mackie Galvez, DMD
- Angel Locsin as Princess "Ces" Bricenio
- Edgar Mortiz as Pedro Galvez
- Tetchie Agbayani as Helen
- Edgar Allan Guzman as Kelvin
- Patrick Garcia as Vincent "Vince" Villegas
- Melissa Mendez as Maria Galvez
- Patrizha Martinez as Joana Galvez
- Dannielle Martinez as Matthea Galvez
- Dana Martinez as Lucy Galvez
- K Brosas as Vivora
- Ian De Leon as Duke
- Boom Labrusca as Ipe
- Hyubs Azarcon as Pong
- Mel Kimura as Alex
- Panying as Butch
- Andi Manzano as Iya
- Isabel de Leon as Manila Bulletin Lifestyle section Editor-in-Chief
- Benjamin Domingo Jr. as Office Janitor

== Production ==
=== Development ===
Molina brainstormed the story back in 2009. In 2011, Star Cinema offered the main protagonists to Cruz and Locsin after their primetime TV Series that aired on ABS-CBN, Imortal. ÜnOfficially Yours was first announced in the now defunct showbiz news program, SNN: Showbiz News Ngayon. The film's tentative title was I Honestly Love You and later changed to ÜnOfficially Yours. The film's principal photography started September 21, 2011, in Batangas and in the headquarters of the Manila Bulletin in Manila.

=== Promotion ===
The full trailer was released during the previews of the Enteng Ng Ina Mo and Segunda Mano, films also produced by Star Cinema. The full trailer was televised on January 29, 2012, during Locsin and Cruz's guesting on the talk show, Gandang Gabi, Vice!. As a result, it became a worldwide trending topic on the social networking site, Twitter. The film became the front page cover of the February 15, 2012, issue of the Manila Bulletin during its premiere day.

=== Music ===
The film's official soundtrack is "If You Asked Me To" originally sung by Patti LaBelle, and was covered by Erik Santos and Angeline Quinto. The song's music video was released on Star Cinema's official YouTube account.

== Reception ==
=== Critical response ===
UnOfficially Yours received generally positive reviews from local film critics. Ria Limjap of Spot.ph praised that the film is "entertaining and funny and poignant." Maureen Belmonte of Manila Bulletin wrote that the film is "worth watching" because it deals with modern-day themes. Noel Torre of Philippine Daily Inquirer praised the performance of the film's lead actors.

=== Box office ===
According to ABS-CBN News, the film opened with an P18.5 million gross nationwide. The film grossed P71.5 million at 140 screens on its first weekend of release beating out Ghost Rider: Spirit of Vengeance in the Philippine Box Office. On its second week, the film dropped 58.3% and grossed 29.8 million, bringing it a total of 113.5 million gross in two weeks. The film's gross income reached 144 million in the third week of showing. After a month, it had grossed P157.25 million at the box office.

ÜnOfficially Yours is currently the sixth highest-grossing Filipino film of all time.

== Release ==
=== Home media ===
The uncut version of ÜnOfficially Yours was released on original DVDs and VCDs on April 4, 2012.

=== International release ===
ÜnOfficially Yours had an international premiere night on February 24, 2012, in Los Angeles, CA in Alex Theatre. It will also be released in several key cities in the United States such as San Diego, CA, San Francisco, CA, Sacramento, CA, Dallas, TX, Houston, TX, Norfolk, VA, Aiea, HI, Park Ridge, IL, Las Vegas, NV, Bergenfield, NJ, and Seattle, WA.

=== Television premiere ===
The film had its television premiere on December 16, 2012, in the cable channel Cinema One.

== Awards ==
Award-Giving Body	Category	Recipient	Result
Yahoo OMG Awards	Actress of the Year	Angel Locsin	Won
