= Close to You (2006 film) =

2006 Filipino film by Cathy Garcia-Molina

- Theatrical movie poster
- Directed by: Cathy Garcia-Molina
- Screenplay by: John Paul Abellera; Mel Mendoza-Del Rosario
- Story by: Mel Mendoza-Del Rosario
- Produced by: Charo Santos-Concio; Malou N. Santos
- Starring: John Lloyd Cruz; Bea Alonzo; Sam Milby
- Cinematography: Gus Cruz
- Edited by: Marya Ignacio
- Music by: Jimmy Antiporda
- Distributed by: Star Cinema
- Release date: February 15, 2006
- Running time: 110 minutes
- Country: Philippines
- Language: Filipino
- Box office: ₱127 million

Close to You is a Filipino film starring John Lloyd Cruz and Bea Alonzo introducing Sam Milby. The movie was released on February 15, 2006, under Star Cinema, directed by Cathy Garcia-Molina. The year 2006 ended with 5 Star Cinema films grossing more than ₱100 million including Close to You itself.

This film was made sponsored by Close-Up, manufactured by Unilever Philippines.

== Plot ==
Manuel and Marian were best friends since they were children. For the last 16 years, Manuel has not told Marian that he loves her.

On the other hand, Marian sees Manuel as no more than her best friend. Marian's greatest love has always been Lance, a classmate who protected her from bullies back in grade school. Ever since Lance and his family migrated abroad ten years ago, Marian has never had the chance to establish contact with him again. The only thing that Marian knows is that Lance has become the lead singer of the new rock band, Orion.

Good fortune smiles on Marian when Orion decides to tour the Philippines. Marian is intent on seeing Lance again, and she brings Manuel with her on a chase that takes them around the Philippines and abroad. Manuel believes that the whole chase is futile because a popular star like Lance will not remember a simple girl like Marian, but Marian does not believe him.

When Lance and Marian finally meet again, sparks fly between them. Manuel now has to decide - will he let his best friend be happy with her Prince Charming, or will he fight for the love that has kept him alive for the last 16 years?

== Cast and characters ==
=== Main cast ===
- John Lloyd Cruz as Manuel Soriano/Palits/Nuel
- Bea Alonzo as Marian Hermosa /Bru

=== Supporting cast ===
- Tetchie Agbayani as Lance's mother
- Nova Villa as Lola Dading
- Melanie Marquez as Nanay
- Boboy Garovillo as Tatay
- Cacai Bautista as Inday
- Joanne Quintas as Cathy
- Karel Marquez as VJ
- Glaiza de Castro as Lance's cousin
- Anna Marie Gallo as Young Marian

=== Introducing ===
- Sam Milby as Lance Guerzon
- Carine Cabebe as Abby
- Reyson Yap as Raffy

== Soundtrack ==
- "Close to You"
  Performed by Sam Milby
- "Closer You and I"
  Performed by Gino Padilla
- "Friend of Mine"
  Performed by Metafour

== Reception ==
The film earned a gross of $52,654.

Rito Asilo the Philippine Daily Inquirer has concerns about the story's plausibility but commended Director Molina's ability to make the narrative believable.

== Trivia ==
Cruz and Alonzo were from the top-rating primetime soap opera Ikaw ang Lahat sa Akin which ended three months later on November 4, 2005 and after three months, they both joined another film All About Love which released on May 31 of the same year with the 3rd and last segment "All About Anna".
