= Sam Milby =

Filipino actor and musician

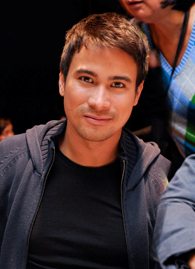
- Milby in 2010
- Born: Samuel Lloyd Milby; May 23, 1984 (age 42); Troy, Ohio, U.S.
- Occupations: Actor; model; singer
- Years active: 2005–present
- Agents: Star Magic (since 2005); ABS-CBN (since 2005); TV5 (since 2023); Advanced Media Broadcasting System (since 2024)
- Relatives: Ada Milby (sister)
- Musical career
- Instruments: Guitar; piano; vocals

Samuel Lloyd Milby (Note: Sam Milby was born in the United States of America, thus he does not possess his mother's maiden surname which is Lacia) (born May 23, 1984) is a Filipino-American actor, model and musician. He came to prominence after joining the first edition of Pinoy Big Brother.

== Biography ==
Samuel Lloyd Milby was born on May 23, 1984 in Troy, Ohio, USA to parents Lloyd William Milby, an American businessman from Ohio, and Elsie Ronquillo Lacia, a Filipina from Tago, Surigao del Sur. Returning to the Philippines in 2005, Milby decided to seriously pursue a career in show business and modeling. He landed bit roles in some ads before obtaining a lead role in Close Up's TV commercial with Barbie Almalbis. He subsequently joined Pinoy Big Brother, which featured 12 men and women from different walks of life; Milby was not one of the original 12, but joined the cast when one of the contestants left the house. After this, he became an actor and recording artist and signed a contract with ABS-CBN. His first major film debut was Close to You, produced by ABS-CBN subsidiary Star Cinema and co-starring John Lloyd Cruz and Bea Alonzo.

In early 2006, Milby released a self-titled debut album. His concert, titled "Heartthrobs", was performed at the Music Museum on February 2 and 3, 2007. It was repeated on March 17, 2007, following the big success of the first concert. His first major solo concert, "Sam Milby: Rockoustic Heartthrob", occurred at the Aliw Theater on October 25, 2008. He also performed in several concerts in USA, Canada, Asia, and Europe.

In 2012, Milby spent three months in the United States, taking part in auditions in New York. He also performed in concerts and tours, playing Lazarus for one night in the Broadway musical Godspell, and guest-starring in Anna Maria's Benefit Concert in New York with Anna Maria's Godspell costars Corbin Bleu, Wallace Smith, Nick Blaemire, Eric Krop, and George Salazar.

In 2013, Milby joined PETA campaign to remove Mali, the only captive elephant in the Philippines, from the Manila zoo, and have her transferred to Boon Lott's Elephant Sanctuary in Thailand.

Milby took part in the Cannes Film Festival in 2013, where the Adolfo Alix Jr. movie Death March, in which he had acted, was screened in Un Certain Regard section.

== Personal life ==
On May 23, 2020, Milby revealed that he is in a relationship with Miss Universe 2018, Catriona Gray. They announced their engagement on February 16, 2023, in a social media post. In 2024, he revealed that he had Type 2 Diabetes. In 2025, he revealed that he and Gray had broken up. He later shared that the breakup with Gray left him in an emotionally vulnerable state.

== Discography ==
=== Albums ===
- Sam Milby (2006, Star Music)
- A Little Too Perfect (2007, Star Music)
- Love Duets (2009, Star Music; collaboration with Toni Gonzaga)
- Be Mine (2011, Star Music)
- Sam:12 (2017, Star Music)

=== Other appearances ===
- 2006, "Langit Na Naman", on Hotsilog: The ASAP Hotdog Compilation
- 2007, "You and I," "Can't Cry Hard Enough," "In Love with You", on Maging Sino Ka Man Soundtrack
- 2012, "After All" on "A Beautiful Affair OST"
- 2014, "And I Love You So", "Chasing Cars" on Star Cinema (20th Year Commemorative Album)

== Filmography ==
=== Television series ===
Year	Title	Role
2006	Star Magic Presents: Tender Loving Care	Calvin
2006	Maging Sino Ka Man	Jaime "JB" Roxas Berenguer
2006	Your Song: I've Fallen in Love	Stephen
2007	Your Song Presents: Breaking Up Is Hard To Do	Will
2007	Your Song Presents: Ikaw Lamang	
2007	Maalaala Mo Kaya: Pilat	Jeffrey
2007	Maging Sino Ka Man: Ang Pagbabalik	Jaime "JB" Roxas Berenguer
2008–2009	Dyosa	Prinsipe Adonis
2009	Only You	Theodore "TJ" Javier Jr.
2009	Your Song Presents: Someone To Love	Morrie Smith
2009	May Bukas Pa	Jeff
2010	Impostor	Anthony Florencio
2010	1DOL	Vincent "Vince" Serrano
2011	Your Song Presents: Kim	Ronnie
2011	Mara Clara	Mara's Sweet 16 Escort
2011	100 Days to Heaven	Roel Villanueva
2011	Maalaala Mo Kaya: Piano	Charles Buenafe
2012	Maalaala Mo Kaya: Journal	Nono Revilleza
2012	Wansapanataym: I'll Be Home For Christmas	Carl
2013	Kahit Konting Pagtingin	Adam Ledesma
2013	Toda Max	Doc Milby
2013	Huwag Ka Lang Mawawala	Eros Diomedes
2014	Mars Ravelo's Dyesebel	Liro
2015	Nathaniel	Anghel Armen
2015–2017	Doble Kara	Sebastian "Seb" Acosta
2018–2019	Halik	Ace Corpuz
2020	The Tapes	Sonny Cruz
2020–2021	Ang sa Iyo ay Akin	Gabriel Villarosa
2022	A Family Affair	Dave Estrella
2024–2025	Saving Grace	Julius Hernandez
2025-2026	The Alibi	Walter Cunanan

=== Television shows ===
Year	Title	Role
2005	Pinoy Big Brother	Contestant
2006–present	ASAP	Host/Performer
2014	Minute to Win It	Guest/Contestant
2023	Magandang Buhay	Guest

=== Film ===
Year	Title	Role
2006	Close to You	Lance Guerzon
2006	You Are the One	Will Derby / Vernard Garcia
2007	You Got Me!	Lt. Kevin Robles
2008	My Big Love	Macky Galvez
2008	My Only Ü	Cameo Role
2008	Cul De Sac (Note: 'indie' film)	Hero
2009	And I Love You So	Chris Panlilio
2009	Ang Tanging Pamilya: A Marry Go Round	Prince Price
2010	Babe, I Love You	Nicolas "Nico" Veneracion Borromeo
2010	Third World Happy	West / Wesley
2011	Forever and a Day	Eugene
2012	This Guy's in Love with U Mare!	Lord
2012	24/7 in Love	Charles Padilla
2013	Four Sisters and a Wedding	Tristan Harris
2013	Death March	Roy Cook
2013	Kimmy Dora: Ang Kiyemeng Prequel	Rodin Bartoletti
2014	Starting Over Again	Engr. Raffy Ariza
2014	The Gifted	Mark Ferrer/Marco Yuzon
2015	The Prenup	Sean Billones
2016	Camp Sawi	Louie/Camp Master
2016	The Third Party	Max Labrador
2018	Ang Pambansang Third Wheel	Neo
2018	Mary, Marry Me	Peter "Pete" Cummings
2019	3pol Trobol: Huli Ka Balbon!	Andrew Esguerra
2020	Hayop Ka! The Nimfa Dimaano Story	Iñigo Villanueva
2025	Ex Ex Lovers	Chef Chico
2025	Everything About My Wife	Miguel

== Awards and nominations ==
Year	Award giving body	Category	Nominated work	Results
2006	19th Aliw Awards	Best New Male Artist	—N/a	Won
2006	36th GMMSF Box-Office Entertainment Awards	Most Promising Male Singer	—N/a	Won
2006	20th PMPC Star Awards for TV	Best New Male TV Personality	ASAP	Won
2006	22nd PMPC Star Awards for Movies	New Movie Actor of the Year	You Are the One	Won
2006	ENPRESS Golden Screen Awards	Breakthrough Performance by an Actor	You Are the One	Nominated
2006	1st ASAP Pop Viewers' Choice Awards	Pop Screen Kiss(shared with Toni Gonzaga)	You Are the One	Won
2006	1st ASAP Pop Viewers' Choice Awards	Pop Movie Theme Song(shared with Toni Gonzaga)	You Are the One (song from the movie You Are the One)	Won
2006	Anak TV Seal Awards	Top 10 Most Admired Male Personality	—N/a	Included
2007	MYX Music Awards	Favorite Male Artist	—N/a	Nominated
2007	37th GMMSF Box-Office Entertainment Awards	Prince of Philippines Movies	You Are the One	Won
2007	2nd ASAP Pop Viewers' Choice Awards	Pop Screen Kiss	You Got Me	Won
2007	21st PMPC Star Awards for TV	Best Drama Actor	Maging Sino Ka Man	Nominated
2008	Star Magic Ball Awards	Most Chandon Sparkling Couple of the Night(shared with Anne Curtis)	—N/a	Won
2008	22nd PMPC Star Awards for TV	Best Drama Actor	Maging Sino Ka Man: Ang Pagbabalik	Nominated
2009	Dangal ng Bayan Awards	Best Actor	Only You	Won
2009	Dangal ng Bayan Awards	Best Male Performing Artist	Love Duets	Won
2010	Gawad Pasado Awards	Best Actor	And I Love You So	Nominated
2010	7th Golden Screen Awards	Best Performance by an Actor in a Leading Role (Drama)	And I Love You So	Nominated
2010	5th ASAP Pop Viewers' Choice Awards	Pop Pin-Up Boy	—N/a	Won
2010	5th ASAP Pop Viewers' Choice Awards	Pop Love Team(shared with Anne Curtis)	Babe, I Love You	Won
2011	35th Gawad Urian Awards	Best Actor	Third World Happy	Nominated
2011	6th Myx Music Awards	Favorite Myx Celebrity VJ	—N/a	Nominated
2011	Eastwood City Walk of Fame	Celebrity Inductee	Acting, Singing, musician, Endorsing	Won
2012	25th Awit Awards	Best Ballad Recording	"Hindi Kita Iiwan"	Won
2012	7th Myx Music Awards	Favorite Mellow Video	"Hindi Kita Iiwan"	Nominated
