= Marian Rivera filmography =

- Film: 27
- Television: 19
- Hosting: 11

The following is a list of performances of Filipino-Spanish actress Marian Rivera in movie and television industry.

== Filmography ==
=== Film ===
Year	Film	Role	Notes
2005	Enteng Kabisote 2: Okay Ka, Fairy Ko... The Legend Continues!	Alyssa	Number One Highest Grossing Filipino Film in 2005 ₱158 Million 31st Metro Manila Film Festival Entry Nominated - 22nd PMC Star Awards for Movies for New Movie Actress of the Year
2006	Pamahiin	Becca	
2007	Bahay Kubo	Lily	33rd Metro Manila Film Festival Entry
2007	Desperadas	Courtney Vallarda-Reyes	33rd Metro Manila Film Festival Entry ₱60 Million
2008	My Bestfriend's Girlfriend	Grace Villaflor	Top 10 Highest Grossing Filipino Film of 2008 ₱107 Million Nominated - 6th Enpress Golden Screen Awards for Best Performance by an Actress in a Leading Role - Musical or Comedy Won - 40th Box-Office Entertainment Awards GMMSF for Valentine Box-Office Queen
2008	One True Love	Joy Mejares	Top 10 Highest Grossing Filipino Film of 2008 ₱100 Million
2008	Scaregivers	Cameo role	
2008	Shake, Rattle & Roll X	Nieves	Top 10 Highest Grossing Filipino Film of 2008 ₱119 Million 34th Metro Manila Film Festival Entry "Nieves the Engkanto Slayer" segment
2008	Desperadas 2	Courtney	₱50 Million 34th Metro Manila Film Festival Entry
2009	Tarot	Cara	Graded A by the Cinema Evaluation Board
2010	You to Me Are Everything	Francisca/Iska Florantes	Top 10 Highest Grossing Filipino Film of 2010 ₱102 Million
2010	Noy	Cameo role	Selected as the Filipino entry for the Best Foreign Language Film at the 83rd Academy Awards
2010	Super Inday and the Golden Bibe	Inday/Super Inday	Nominated - 36th Metro Manila Film Festival for Best Actress
2011	Temptation Island	Cristina G.	₱61 Million
2011	Zombadings 1: Patayin sa Shokot si Remington	Cameo role	Highest-Grossing Filipino Independent Film of 2011.
2011	Tween Academy: Class of 2012	Cameo role	
2011	Ang Panday 2	Arlana/Bagwis	Top 10 Highest Grossing Filipno Film in 2011 ₱105 Million 37th Metro Manila Film Festival Nominated - 60th FAMAS Awards for Best Actress
2013	Dance of the Steelbars	Cameo role	
2013	My Lady Boss	Evelyn Vallejo	
2013	Ekstra	Belinda	9th Cinemalaya Film Festival Entry Nominated - 48th Worldfest-Houston International Film Festival for Best Supporting Actress
2013	Kung Fu Divas	Samantha	Top 10 Highest-Grossing Filipino Films in 2013 ₱65 Million Nominated - 62nd FAMAS Awards for Best Actress: 34th Fantasporto International Film Festival; Official Selection - Orient Express Section; 14th Neuchatel International Fantastic Film Festival; Official Selection - New Cinema From Asia; Feratum 2014, Mexico; Exhibition Film
2014	Kubot: The Aswang Chronicles 2	Aswang in the wake Cameo role	₱120 Million; 40th Metro Manila Film Festival Entry
2014	My Big Bossing's Adventures	Clarissa	₱140 Million Taktak segment 40th Metro Manila Film Festival Entry
2016	Imagine You and Me	Cameo role	₱198 Million
2018	Fantastica	Cameo role	₱596 Million; 44th Metro Manila Film Festival Entry
2023	Rewind	Mary	Second Highest Grossing Filipino Film of All Time ₱924 Million Nominated— 49th Metro Manila Film Festival Awards for Best Actress; Won — 2024 Platinum Stallion National Media Awards for Best Film Actress; Won — 2024 Box Office Entertainment Awards for Phenomenal Box Office Star and Most Popular Loveteam for Movies (with Dingdong Dantes); Won— 5th Village Pipol Awards for Movie Actress of the Year; Nominated— 2024 FAMAS Awards for Best Actress; Won— 2024 FAMAS Awards for Bida ng Takilya Award; Nominated— 40th PMPC Star Awards for Movies for Best Actress; Won— 40th PMPC Star Awards for Movies for Takilya Queen; Nominated— 7th EDDYS Awards for Best Actress; Won— 7th EDDYS Awards for Box Office Hero
2024	Balota	Emmy	Highest Grossing film in the history of Cinemalaya Selection finalist at 44th Hawaii International Film Festival Won - 20th Cinemalaya Film Festival for Best Actress Won - 53rd Box Office Entertainment Awards GMMSF for Film Actress of the Year Won - 8th Eddy’s Awards for Best Actress Won - 73rd FAMAS Awards for Best Actress Won - Manila Film Critics Circle Awards for Best Actress Nominated - 41st PMPC Star Awards for Best Actress Won - 27th Gawad Pasado - Dangal ng Pasado Para sa Natatanging Pagganap Won - 6th VP Choice Awards - Headliner of the Year Won - 8th Gawad Lasallianeta for Best Actress Nominated - Best Lead Performance 5th Society of Filipino Film Reviewers Won - 1st Philppine Arts, Film & Televesion Awards - PAFTA Modern Grandslam Best Actress
2026	Remember	Ria	

=== Television series ===
Year	Title	Role	Notes
2005–2006	Kung Mamahalin Mo Lang Ako	Clarisse Pelaez	
2006	Agawin Mo Man ang Lahat	Almira Dueñas / Isadora Valencia / Alegra	Won 20th PMPC Star Awards for Best New Female TV Personality
2006	Pinakamamahal	Carissa Crismundo	
2007	Super Twins	Ester Paredes	
2007	Muli	Racquel Estadilla	First international drama stint
2007–2008	MariMar	MariMar Perez/Bella Aldama	Won—Fil-Am Visionary Awards for Favorite Actress Won—USTv Student Choice for Most Popular Actress in a Drama/Miniseries Won - 38th Box-office Awards GMMSF for Most Promising Female Star Won— 38th Box-office Awards GMMSF for Phenomenal TV Star Included to Highest Ratings of All Time
2008	Dyesebel	Dyesebel/Isabel/Cassandra	First Mars Ravelo's super heroine lead Won - 40th Box Office Entertainment Awards for Most Phenomenal Loveteam Included to Highest Ratings of All Time
2009	Ang Babaeng Hinugot sa Aking Tadyang	Proserfina J. Valdez/Andrea	
2009–2010	Mars Ravelo's Darna	Narda/Darna	Second Mars Ravelo's super heroine lead Included to Highest Ratings of All Time
2010	Endless Love	Jenny Dizon/Jenny Cruz	Won - 41st Box Office Entertainment Awards for Love Team of the Year
2010	Jillian: Namamasko Po	Odessa Fuentes	
2011–2012	Amaya	Amaya/Bai Amaya/Dian Amaya	Won - 26th PMPC Star Awards For TV Best Drama Series Amaya; Won - KZONE Awards for Favorite TV Actress; Won—NSSUAA 2012 for Best Actress; Won - NSSUAA 2013 for Best Actress; Won– 10th Golden Screen TV Awards for Best Actress First Ever Historical Epic Period Drama on Philippine Television
2012	My Beloved	Sharina Quijano	
2012–13	Temptation of Wife	Angeline Santos-Salcedo / Chantal Gonzales/Angeline Santos-Armada	Won - 27th PMPC Star Awards for TV for Best Drama Actress Nominated - 18th Asian TV Awards for Best Actress in a Leading Role Nominated 11th Enpress TV Awards for Best Actress Won—NSSUAA for Best Actress
2014	Carmela: Ang Pinakamagandang Babae sa Mundong Ibabaw	Carmela Fernandez/Catarina Bulaong	
2015	Pari 'Koy	Cameo role	
2016; 2017	Encantadia	Ynang Reyna Minea	
2017–18	Super Ma'am	Bb. Minerva Henerala	Lead role Nominated - 38th PMPC Star Awards for TV for Best Drama Actress
2024	My Guardian Alien	Katherine Villegas-Soriano / 11-1-20-8-5-22-9-12-5 / Grace B. Formin / Mommy Two	Lead role Nominated - 38th PMPC Star Awards for TV for Best Drama Actress

=== Television shows ===
Year	Title	Role	Notes
2005	Ang Mahiwagang Baul: Ang Alamat ng Kawayan	Rahinda	
2009	Sugat ng Kahapon	Hilda	
2009–2011	Show Me Da Manny	Ella Paredes	First comedy program
2010	Anghel sa Lupa	Theresa San Miguel	
2011	Spooky Nights: Bampirella	Cinderella "Cindy" Dela Paz/Bampirella	
2012	Tweets for My Sweet	Megan "Meg" Reyes	Nominated - 26th PMC Star Awards for TV for Best Comedy Actress; Nominated—Enpress Screen TV Awards for Outstanding Performance by an Actress in a Gag or Comedy Program
2013	One Day, Isang Araw: Ang Sikreto ni Milette	Milette	
2014	Panalangin	Lauren	
2014	Ismol Family	Angge	
2014	Vampire ang Daddy Ko	Dang	
2015	Eat Bulaga Lenten Special: Aruga ng Puso	Vanjie	Nominated—EB Dabarkads Awards for Best Actress
2015	Pepito Manaloto: Ang Tunay na Kwento	Melissa	
2016	Magic of Christmas: The 2016 GMA Christmas Special	Herself	Performer
2017	Dear Uge: Me and Madam	Isha	Episode guest
2017	Daig Kayo ng Lola Ko	Gracia Idelfonso/Grasa	Episode guest
2018	Daig Kayo ng Lola Ko: The Runaway Princess Bride	Princess Annie	Episode guest
2021	70th Miss Universe	Herself	Judge
2022; 24	Jose & Maria's Bonggang Villa	Maria	
2025	Stars on the Floor	Herself	Judge

=== Hosting ===
Year	Title	Role	Notes
2007–10	SOP Rules	Herself/Performer	
2010–12	Party Pilipinas	Herself/Performer	
2012	Pinoy Adventures	Herself/Co-Host	First hosting stint
2012	Showbiz Central	Herself/Guest Co-Host	
2012–2013	Extra Challenge	Herself/Co-Host	Nominated - 27th PMPC Star Awards for TV for Best Reality-Competition Host Won - 27th PMPC Star Awards for TV for Best Reality-Competition Program
2014–2015	Eat Bulaga!	Herself/Co-Host	
2014	Marian	Herself/Host	Self-titled dance program Nominated - 28th PMPC Star Awards for TV for Best Musical Variety Show
2015–2019	Sunday PinaSaya	Herself/Mainstay	Nominated - 30th PMPC Star Awards for TV for Best Female TV Host Won - 31st PMPC Star Awards for TV for Best Female TV Host Nominated - 32nd PMC Star Awards for TV for Best Female TV Host Nominated - 33rd PMC Star Awards for TV for Best Female TV Host Won - 49th Box Office Entertainment Awards for Female TV Host of the Year
2016	Yan ang Morning!	Herself/Host	
2017–present	Tadhana	Herself/Host	Won - 8th Overseas Filipino Workers Gawad Parangal for Best Actress Won - 2018 Commission on DFA for Best OFW Show Nominated - 31st PMPC Star Awards for TV for Best Drama Anthology Nominated - 32nd PMPC Star Awards for TV for Best Drama Anthology Nominated - 33rd PMPC Star Awards for TV for Best Drama Anthology Nominated - 34th PMPC Star Awards for TV for Best Drama Anthology Nominated - 35th PMPC Star Awards for TV for Best Drama Anthology Nominated - 36th PMPC Star Awards for TV for Best Drama Anthology

== Discography ==
=== Albums ===
Year	Title	Sales	Certification
2008	Marian Rivera Dance Hits: Released: 30 March 2008; Label: Universal Records; Formats: CD, CD+VCD, digital download	15,000 copies	PARI: 2× Platinum
2009	Retro Crazy: Released: January 2009; Label: Universal Records; Formats: CD, CD+VCD, digital download	15,000 copies	PARI: Platinum

=== Singles ===
Year	Title	Album	Sales	Certification
2009	"Sabay Sabay Tayo"	Retro Crazy	15,000 copies	PARI: Gold; ASAP 24K Gold Award
