= List of awards and nominations received by John Lloyd Cruz =

John Lloyd Cruz awards and nominations
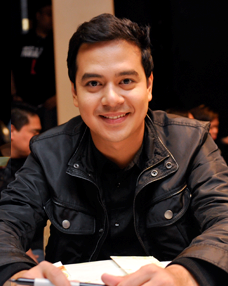
- John Lloyd Cruz in 2010
Awards and nominations
Award	Wins	Nominations

Totals (Note: Certain award groups do not simply award one winner. They acknowledge several different recipients, have runners-up, and have third place. Since this is a specific recognition and is different from losing an award, runner-up mentions are considered wins in this award tally. For simplification and to avoid errors, each award in this list has been presumed to have had a prior nomination.)
- Wins: 81
- Nominations: 36

John Lloyd Espidol Cruz is a Filipino actor, model and occasional TV host.

On July 30, 2008, Cruz starred with Sarah Geronimo in A Very Special Love under Star Cinema and Viva Films. The film grossed PHP 179,569,117 at the box office.

In February 2009, Cruz's follow-up movie with Sarah Geronimo, You Changed My Life, hit the box office. The film was the sequel to A Very Special Love, and was also produced by Star Cinema and Viva Films. The film's total theatrical earnings reached PHP 240.44 million and is ranked as the 4th "Highest Top-Grossing Filipino Film of All Time".

He was eventually hailed as the "Box-Office King" for two consecutive years: in 2007 for the film, One More Chance, and in 2008 with the film, A Very Special Love. Success followed in 2009 with the film, You Changed My Life, which became the top-grossing film of his career.

On February 24, 2010, John Lloyd's reunion movie with Bea Alonzo, Miss You Like Crazy, a box office hit too. In the first showing day, they already had P18 million. John Lloyd here played the role of Allan Alvarez, with Bea Alonzo as Mia Samonte. MYLC is said as the best movie of the year.

== Awards ==
=== Film and television awards ===
Movie/TV Show	Category	Organization/Year
Ang Babaeng Humayo	Best Supporting Actor	1st Eddy (Entertainment Editors' Choice)
A Second Chance	Most Influential Film Actor of the Year	6th EdukCircle Awards (2016)
Honor Thy Father	Best Actor	39th Gawad Urian (2016)
The Trial	Film Actor Of The Year	46th Guillermo Mendoza Box-Office Entertainment Awards
The Trial	PinakaPASADONG Aktor	Gawad PASADO Awards (2015)
The Trial	Movie Actor Of The Year	31st Star Awards for Movies
It Takes a Man and a Woman	Box Office King	Guillermo Mendoza Memorial Scholarship Foundation (2014)
It Takes a Man and a Woman	Best Performance by an Actor in a Lead Role for Musical or Comedy	ENPRESS Golden Screen Awards (2014)
The Mistress	Box Office King	Guillermo Mendoza Memorial Scholarship Foundation (2013)
The Mistress	Best Actor	Luna Awards (2013)
Miss You Like Crazy	Best Actor	FAMAS Awards (2011)
Miss You Like Crazy	Film Actor of the Year	42nd Box Office Entertainment Awards Guillermo Mendoza Memorial Scholarship Foundation (GMMSF).
You Changed My Life	Box Office King	Makabata Awardee
You Changed My Life	Box Office King	41st Box Office Entertainment Awards Guillermo Mendoza Memorial Scholarship Foundation (GMMSF).
In My Life	Film Actor of the Year	40th Guillermo Mendoza Memorial Scholarship Foundation (2010)
In My Life	Movie Actor of the Year	26th PMPC Star Awards for Movies (2010)
In My Life	Pinakapasadong Aktor	Gawad PASADO (2010)
In My Life	Best Actor	8th Gawad Tanglaw (2010)
In My Life	Best Supporting Actor	1st MTRCB Awards for Movies (2010)
A Very Special Love	Box Office King	40th Guillermo Mendoza Memorial Scholarship Foundation, Inc. (GMMSFI) (2009)
I Love Betty La Fea	Best Drama Actor in a Daily Soap Opera	USTv Students' Choice Awards (2009)
One More Chance	Box Office King	Box-Office Entertainment Awards by Guillermo Mendoza Memorial Scholarship Foundation, Inc. (GMMSFI) (2008)
One More Chance	Best Drama Actor	ENPRESS Golden Screen Awards (2008)
All About Love	Best Actor	Luna Awards (2008)
Maging Sino Ka Man	Best Drama Actor	PMPC Star Awards for TV (2007)
Maging Sino Ka Man	Best Drama Actor	USTv Students' Choice Awards (2007)
Dubai	Film Actor of the Year	Guillermo Mendoza Memorial Scholarship Foundation (2006)
Dubai	Best Actor	Gawad Pasado (2006)
Dubai	Best Actor	UST Youth Choice Awards for Movies (2006)
Dubai	Best Supporting Actor	FAMAS Awards (2006)
Dubai	Best Supporting Actor	Mara Clara Awards (2006)
Dubai	Best Supporting Actor	PMPC Star Awards for Movies (2006)
Maalaala Mo Kaya "Skating Rink"	Best Single Performance by a Lead Actor	ENPRESS Golden Screen Entertainment TV Awards (2006)
Maalaala Mo Kaya	Best Actor by a Single Performance	PMPC Star Awards for TV (2006)
Ikaw Ang Lahat Sa Akin	Best Drama Actor	USTv Students' Choice Awards (2006)
It Might Be You	Best Drama Actor	PMPC Star Awards for TV (2005)
It Might Be You	Best Drama Actor	USTv Students' Choice Awards (2005)
Tabing Ilog	Best Drama Actor	PMPC Star Awards for TV (2001)

=== Box-office and entertainment industry awards and special awards ===
Category	Organization/Year
Most Influential Celebrity Endorser of the Year	5th EdukCircle Awards (2015)
Most Influential Celebrity Endorser of the Year	4th EdukCircle Awards (2014)
Box Office King "It Takes a Man and a Woman"	Guillermo Mendoza Memorial Scholarship Foundation (2014)
Box Office King "The Mistress"	Guillermo Mendoza Memorial Scholarship Foundation (2013)
Pop Male Fashionista	ASAP Pop Viewers' Choice Awards (2011)
Most Beautiful Star	YES! Magazine (2011)
Box Office King "My Amnesia Girl"	SM Cinema (2011)
Star Magic Icon	Star Magic Ball (2011)
BOX OFFICE KING	Makabata Awardee
ANAK TV Awards	Country's One of the People's Genuine Choices for the Most Admired and Most Child-Sensitive Personalities on local television (2010)
Pop Male Fashionista	ASAP Pop Viewers' Choice Awards (2010)
Star Magic King	Star Magic Ball (2010)
Box Office King "You Changed My Life"	SM Cinema (2010)
Box Office King "You Changed My Life"	Guillermo Mendoza Memorial Scholarship Foundation (2010)
1 of 16 "Men Who Matter"	People's Asia Magazine (2010)
Top 3 of 100 Most Beautiful Stars	YES! Magazine (2010)
One of the 10 Stars Who Rule in the Decade	Cosmopolitan Magazine (2010)
12th Star Who Rule in the Decade	YES Magazine (2010)
One of Philippine's Top 10 Lead Drama Actors	www.pinoyblogazine.blogspot.com (2010)
Most Stirring Couple with Sarah Geronimo	STIR Awards (2010)
Box Office King "A Very Special Love"	SM Cinema (2009)
ANAK TV Awards	One of the People's Genuine Choices for the Most Admired and Most Child-Sensitive Personalities on local television "Makabata Awardee" (2009)
Pop Love Team (with Sarah Geronimo)	ASAP Pop Viewers' Choice Awards (2009)
Box Office King "A Very Special Love"	SM Cinema (2009)
Box Office King "A Very Special Love"	Guillermo Mendoza Memorial Scholarship Foundation (2009)
Star in the Philippine Walk of Fame	German Moreno and Eastwood City (2009)
One of Anak TV Seal's Most-Admired Male TV Personalities	Southeast Asian Foundation for Children's Television (2009)
3rd Most Powerful Celebrity	YES! Magazine (2009)
One of 15 Cinema One Legends	Cinema One Originals Awards (2009)
Male Star of the Night	PMPC Star Awards for Movies (2009)
Male Face of the Night	PMPC Star Awards for TV (2009)
Most Stylish Star Of The Night	Star Magic Ball (2009)
Box Office King "One More Chance"	Guillermo Mendoza Memorial Scholarship Foundation (2008)
One of Anak TV Seal's Most-Admired Male TV Personalities	Southeast Asian Foundation for Children's Television (2008)
Pop Screen Kiss (with Bea Alonzo)	ASAP Pop Viewers' Choice Awards (2008)
Pop Love Team (with Bea Alonzo)	ASAP Pop Viewers' Choice Awards (2008)
One of Anak TV Seal's Most-Admired Male TV Personalities	Southeast Asian Foundation for Children's Television (2007)
Male Face of the Night	PMPC Star Awards for TV (2007)
Most Popular Love Team with Bea Alonzo	YES! Magazine (2006)
Young Male Superstar	YES! Magazine (2006)
One of Anak TV Seal's Most-Admired Male TV Personalities	Southeast Asian Foundation for Children's Television (2006)
Prince of RP Movies "Now That I Have You"	Guillermo Mendoza Memorial Scholarship Foundation (2004)
Most Popular Love Team of RP Movies with Bea Alonzo	Guillermo Mendoza Memorial Scholarship Foundation (2003)

== Nominations ==
=== Film nominations ===
Movie	Category	Organization/Year
Honor Thy Father	Best Actor	41st Metro Manila Film Festival, 2015
It Takes a Man and a Woman	Best Actor	62nd FAMAS Awards
The Mistress	Best Actor	61st FAMAS Awards
Miss You Like Crazy	Best Film Actor	Gawad Genio Awards 2011
In My Life	Best Actor	33rd Gawad Urian Awards 2010
In My Life	Best Actor (Drama)	7th ENPRESS Golden Screen Awards 2010
You Changed My Life	Best Actor (Musical or Comedy)	7th ENPRESS Golden Screen Awards 2010
You Changed My Life	Best Actor	58th FAMAS Awards
A Very Special Love	Best Actor	FAP (LUNA) Awards 2009
A Very Special Love	Best Actor	PMPC Star Awards for Movies 2009
A Very Special Love	Best Actor	Gawad Pasado Award 2009
A Very Special Love	Best Actor (Musical or Comedy)	ENPRESS Golden Screen Awards 2009
One More Chance	Best Actor	FAP (LUNA) 2009
One More Chance	Best Actor	PMPC Star Awards for Movies 2008
One More Chance	Best Film Actor	Gawad Genio Awards 2008
One More Chance	Best Actor	FAMAS 2008
Close To You	Best Actor (Musical or Comedy)	ENPRESS Golden Screen Awards 2007
Dubai	Best Supporting Actor	U.P. Film Desk of the Young Critics Circle Award for Movies 2006
Dubai	Best Supporting Actor	Gawad Urian Awards 2006
Dubai	Best Supporting Actor	FAP Luna Awards 2006
Dubai	Best Supporting Actor	Gawad Tanglaw Awards 2006
Now That I Have You	Best Actor (Musical or Comedy)	ENPRESS Golden Screen Awards 2005

=== Television nominations ===
TV show	Category	Organization/Year
Home Sweetie Home	Best Comedy Actor	28th PMPC Star Awards for TV
A Beautiful Affair	Best Drama Actor	27th PMPC Star Awards for TV
A Beautiful Affair	Outstanding Performance by an Actor in a Drama Series	ENPRESS Golden Screen TV Awards
Imortal	Best Drama Actor	25th PMPC Star Awards for TV
Maalaala Mo Kaya "Pedicab"	Best Single Performance by a Lead Actor	23rd PMPC Star Awards for TV
Maging Sino Ka Man Ang Pagbabalik	Best Drama Actor	22nd PMPC Star Awards for TV
Maging Sino Ka Man Ang Pagbabalik	Favorite Actor	Nickelodeon Philippines Kids' Choice Awards 2008
Maalaala Mo Kaya "Kuwintas"	Best Single Performance by a Lead Actor	PMPC Star Awards for TV 2007
Ikaw Ang Lahat Sa Akin	Best Drama Actor	PMPC Star Awards for TV 2006
Ikaw Ang Lahat Sa Akin	Best Drama Actor	ENPRESS Golden Screen Entertainment TV Awards 2006
Kay Tagal Kang Hinintay	Best Drama Actor	PMPC Star Awards for TV 2004
Kay Tagal Kang Hinintay	Best Drama Actor	PMPC Star Awards for TV 2003
Tabing Ilog	Best Drama Actor	ENPRESS Golden Screen Entertainment TV Awards 2002

=== Box-office and entertainment industry awards and special nominations ===
Category	Organization/Year
Favorite Guest Appearance in a Music Video "You Changed My Life"	Myx Music Awards 2010
