= Carmi G. Raymundo =

Filipino screenwriter and film producer

- Education: University of the Philippines Diliman - Film Institute
- Occupations: Screenwriter, film producer, creative head of ABS-CBN Film Productions
- Years active: 2004 - present
- Employer: ABS-CBN
- Notable work: One More Chance; A Second Chance; Bride for Rent; Starting Over Again; Bride for Rent; Barcelona: A Love Untold; The Hows of Us; Rewind; Hello, Love, Goodbye; Hello, Love, Again

Carmi G. Raymundo is a Filipino screenwriter and film producer. A resident writer and creative head of ABS-CBN Film Productions, she has co-written and co-produced several blockbuster Filipino films including One More Chance, Bride for Rent, Just the Way You Are, Starting Over Again, A Second Chance, The Hows of Us, Rewind, Hello, Love, Goodbye and Hello, Love, Again in which the latter six movies were among the highest grossing Filipino movies of all time. She studied filmmaking at the University of the Philippines Diliman and began her career at ABS-CBN.

== Early life and education ==
Initially, Raymundo wanted to become a broadcasting journalist. During her stay at the University of the Philippines (UP), she was unable to enroll in the broadcasting course because the quota for enrollees was full; she took up filmmaking instead. She studied at the University of the Philippines Diliman - Film Institute for Film and Audio Communication.

== Career ==
Raymundo's career with ABS-CBN began when she was hired as a creative consultant for Star Cinema movies. She started in an entry-level position where she would get the copy of the scripts, photocopy them for the actors, and order food for the staff. She learned script writing by joining the sit-in meeting with the TV and movie crew, listening to the management while the concept of the script was being formed by asking the staff for feedback and opinions.

She was asked to revise the confrontation script in John Lloyd Cruz and Bea Alonzo's movie, Now That I Have You (2004). While writing the script, Director Olivia Lamasan, her supervisor passed by and read the revised scripts, saying, "How can she demand the audience to cry or laugh with her, if she is unable to feel any strong emotions from the story?"" This feedback fueled her to write a better script.

Her first big break as a scriptwriter was in the movie, All About Love (2006) directed by Joyce Bernal in the episode, Kalea After writing the episode, Raymundo was tasked to write a script for a full-length film, You Are the One (2006) which was directed by Cathy Garcia-Sampana. This movie marked the beginning of many collaborations with director Garcia-Sampana.

She wrote the scripts for the movie, One More Chance (2007), directed by Cathy Garcia-Sampana, starring John Lloyd Cruz and Bea Alonzo. The movie became a blockbuster hit and opened many opportunities for her and the entire team.

According to Raymundo herself, screenwriting craft and the creation of films for a broad audience — are what connect viewers to a film, helping them feel that they are not alone in their struggles. As her professional career progressed, the strengths of her films were increasingly recognized.

== Filmography ==
=== Movies ===
Year	Title	Credited as		Notes	Ref.
Year	Title	Screenwriter	Producer	Notes	Ref.
2025	Call Me Mother	No	Yes	Supervising producer	
2025	Love You So Bad	No	Yes	Supervising producer	
2025	Meet, Greet & Bye	No	Yes	Supervising producer	
2025	Sosyal Climbers	No	Yes	Supervising producer	
2025	My Love Will Make You Disappear	No	Yes	Supervising producer	
2024	And the Breadwinner Is...	No	Yes	Supervising producer	
2024	Hello, Love, Again	Yes	Yes	Story and supervising producer	
2024	Un/Happy for You	No	Yes	Supervising producer	
2023	Rewind	Yes	Yes	Creative director,co-scriptwriter and producer	
2023	Toss Coin	No	Yes	Supervising producer	
2023	A Very Good Girl	No	Yes	Supervising producer	
2022	Labyu with an Accent	No	Yes	Supervising producer	
2022	An Inconvenient Love	No	Yes	Supervising producer	
2021	Love Is Color Blind	No	Yes	Creative producer	
2021	Love or Money	No	Yes	Creative producer	
2021	Princess DayaReese	No	Yes	Creative producer	
2019	Hello, Love, Goodbye	Yes	Yes	Story and producer	
2018	I Love You, Hater	Yes	Yes	Story and creative producer	
2018	My Perfect You	No	Yes	Creative producer	
2018	The Hows of Us	No	Yes	Creative producer	
2017	Finally Found Someone	Yes	Yes	Creative producer	
2017	Loving in Tandem	No	Yes	Creative producer	
2017	My Ex and Whys	Yes	No		
2017	Can't Help Falling in Love	Yes	No		
2016	Barcelona: A Love Untold	Yes	No		
2016	Always Be My Maybe	No	Yes	Creative producer	
2015	A Second Chance	Yes	Yes	Creative producer	
2015	Just the Way You Are	Yes	Yes	Creative producer	
2015	Crazy Beautiful You	Yes	Yes	Creative producer	
2015	You're My Boss	No	Yes	Creative producer	
2014	She's Dating the Gangster	Yes	Yes	Creative producer	
2014	Starting Over Again	Yes	Yes	Creative producer	
2014	Bride for Rent	Yes	Yes	Creative producer	
2013	It Takes a Man and a Woman	Yes	Yes	Creative producer	
2013	Bakit Hindi Ka Crush ng Crush Mo?	No	Yes	Creative producer	
2013	Tuhog	No	Yes	Creative producer	
2013	A Moment in Time	No	Yes	Creative producer	
2012	24/7 in Love	Yes	Yes	Creative producer	
2012	Born to Love You	No	Yes	Creative producer	
2012	Unofficially Yours	No	Yes	Creative producer	
2011	Won't Last a Day Without You	Yes	Yes	Creative producer	
2011	Forever and a Day	Yes	Yes	Creative producer	
2011	In the Name of Love	No	Yes	Creative producer	
2011	Bulong	No	Yes	Creative producer	
2010	My Amnesia Girl	Yes	Yes	Creative producer	
2010	I Do	No	Yes	Creative producer	
2010	Miss You like Crazy	No	Yes	Creative producer	
2010	Paano na Kaya	No	Yes	Creative producer	
2009	I Love You, Goodbye	No	Yes	Creative producer	
2009	Ang Tanging Pamilya	No	Yes	Creative producer	
2009	In My Life	No	Yes	Creative producer	
2009	And I Love You So	No	Yes	Creative producer	
2009	You Changed My Life	Yes	No	Creative producer	
2008	Caregiver	No	Yes	Associate producer	
2008	Love Me Again (Land Down Under)	No	Yes	Associate producer	
2008	A Very Special Love	No	Yes	Associate producer	
2007	One More Chance	Yes	Yes	Associate producer	
2007	A Love Story	No	Yes	Associate producer	
2006	You Are the One	Yes	No		
2006	All About Love	Yes	No		

=== As scriptwriter in TV series ===
- 2020 - 2021 - The House Arrest of Us
