= List of 2015 box office number-one films in the Philippines =

This is a list of films which placed number one at the weekend box office for the year 2015 in the Philippines.

== Number-one films ==
†	This implies the highest-grossing movie of the year.

Date	Title	Studio	Gross	Ref
January 7, 2015	Seventh Son	Legendary Pictures, Moving Picture Company, Outlaw Sinema, Pendle Mountain Productions, Thunder Road Pictures, China Film Group, & Beijing Skywheel Entertainment Co.	$810,405	
January 14, 2015	Seventh Son	Legendary Pictures, Moving Picture Company, Outlaw Sinema, Pendle Mountain Productions, Thunder Road Pictures, China Film Group, & Beijing Skywheel Entertainment Co.	$428,589	
January 21, 2015	Annie	Columbia Pictures, Village Roadshow Pictures, Overbrook Entertainment, Marcy Media Films, & Olive Bridge Entertainment	$223,720	
January 28, 2015	Into the Woods	Walt Disney Pictures, Lucamar Productions, & Marc Platt Productions	$789,536	
February 4, 2015	Project Almanac	Insurge Pictures, MTV Films, & Platinum Dunes	$242,314	
February 11, 2015	Fifty Shades of Grey	Focus Features, Michael De Luca Productions, & Trigger Street Productions	$2,047,933	
February 18, 2015	Fifty Shades of Grey	Focus Features, Michael De Luca Productions, & Trigger Street Productions	$660,800	
February 25, 2015	Focus	RatPac-Dune Entertainment, Di Novi Pictures, & Zaftig Films	$255,679	
March 4, 2015	Chappie	Columbia Pictures, MRC, LStar Capitol, & Kinberg Genre	$330,958	
March 11, 2015	Cinderella	Walt Disney Productions, Kinberg Genre, Beagle Pug Films, & Allison Shearmur Productions	$1,922,340	
March 18, 2015	Cinderella	Walt Disney Productions, Kinberg Genre, Beagle Pug Films, & Allison Shearmur Productions	$1,148,715	
March 25, 2015	The Divergent Series: Insurgent	Summit Entertainment, Red Wagon Entertainment, & Mandeville Films	$780,234	
April 1, 2015	Furious 7	Universal Pictures, MRC, Original Film, One Race Films, China Film Co., Ltd., & Dentsu Inc.	$2,121,499	
April 8, 2015	Furious 7	Universal Pictures, MRC, Original Film, One Race Films, China Film Co., Ltd., & Dentsu Inc.	$3,514,471	
April 15, 2015	Furious 7	Universal Pictures, MRC, Original Film, One Race Films, China Film Co., Ltd., & Dentsu Inc.	$1,316,875	
April 22, 2015	Avengers: Age of Ultron †	Marvel Studios	$7,365,190	
April 29, 2015	Avengers: Age of Ultron †	Marvel Studios	$2,801,636	
May 6, 2015	Avengers: Age of Ultron †	Marvel Studios	$1,056,511	
May 13, 2015	Pitch Perfect 2	Gold Circle Films & Brownstone Productions	$2,101,584	
May 20, 2015	Pitch Perfect 2	Gold Circle Films & Brownstone Productions	$1,132,491	
May 27, 2015	San Andreas	New Line Cinema, Village Roadshow Pictures, RatPac Dune Entertainment, & Flynn Picture Company	$1,626,414	
June 3, 2015	Insidious: Chapter 3	Blumhouse Productions, Entertainment One, & Stage 6 Films	$1,449,918	
June 10, 2015	Jurassic World	Universal Pictures, Amblim Entertainment, Legendary Pictures, & The Kennedy/Marshall Company	$5,530,168	
June 17, 2015	Jurassic World	Universal Pictures, Amblim Entertainment, Legendary Pictures, & The Kennedy/Marshall Company	$2,606,039	
June 24, 2015	Jurassic World	Universal Pictures, Amblim Entertainment, Legendary Pictures, & The Kennedy/Marshall Company	$1,139,997	
July 1, 2015	The Breakup Playlist	ABS-CBN Film Pictures & Viva Films	$1,729,735	
July 8, 2015	Minions	Universal Pictures & Illumination Entertainment	$4,182,042	
July 15, 2015	Ant-Man	Marvel Studios	$2,829,388	
July 22, 2015	Ant-Man	Marvel Studios	$1,194,949	
July 29, 2015	Mission: Impossible – Rogue Nation	Paramount Pictures, Skydance Productions, TC Productions, & Bad Robot	$2,314,349	
August 5, 2015	Fantastic Four	20th Century Fox, Constantin Film, Marvel Entertainment, Marv Films, Kinberg Genre & Moving Picture Company	$1,676,992	
August 12, 2015	The Love Affair	ABS-CBN Film Productions	$1,621,012	
August 19, 2015	Inside Out	Pixar Animation Studios	$2,086,665	
August 26, 2015	Pixels	Columbia Picture, LStar Capitol, China Film Co., Ltd., Happy Madison Productions, 1492 Pictures, & Film Croppers Entertainment	$993,942	
September 2, 2015	Ex with Benefits	ABS-CBN Film Pictures, Viva Films, & Skylight Films	$872,000	
September 9, 2015	Maze Runner: The Scorch Trials	Gotham Group, Temple Hill Entertainment	$1,353,269	
September 16, 2015	Maze Runner: The Scorch Trials	Gotham Group, Temple Hill Entertainment	$743,830	
September 23, 2015	Hotel Transylvania 2	Columbia Pictures, Sony Pictures Animation, Sony Pictures Imageworks, LStar Capitol, & MRC	$1,632,061	
September 30, 2015	Etiquette for Mistresses	ABS-CBN Film Productions, Inc.	$1,360,573	
October 7, 2015	Felix Manalo	Viva Films	$2,860,858	
October 14, 2015	Felix Manalo	Viva Films	$546,687	
October 21, 2015	The Last Witch Hunter	Summit Entertainment, Mark Canton Productions, One Race Films, & Goldmann Pictures	$747,905	
October 28, 2015	Everyday I Love You	ABS-CBN Film Productions, Inc.	$1,763,428	
November 4, 2015	Spectre	Eon Productions, Metro-Goldwyn-Mayer, Columbia Pictures, B24, & Danjaq	$1,388,286	
November 11, 2015	Spectre	Eon Productions, Metro-Goldwyn-Mayer, Columbia Pictures, B24, & Danjaq	$1,259,330	
November 18, 2015	Spectre	Eon Productions, Metro-Goldwyn-Mayer, Columbia Pictures, B24, & Danjaq	$316,656	
November 25, 2015	Spectre	Eon Productions, Metro-Goldwyn-Mayer, Columbia Pictures, B24, & Danjaq	$46,891	
December 2, 2015	Spectre	Eon Productions, Metro-Goldwyn-Mayer, Columbia Pictures, B24, & Danjaq	$3,808	
December 9, 2015	A Second Chance	ABS-CBN Film Productions, Inc.	$550,206	
December 16, 2015	Star Wars: The Force Awakens	Lucasfilm Ltd. & Bad Robot	$3,972,605	
December 23, 2015	Star Wars: The Force Awakens	Lucasfilm Ltd. & Bad Robot	N/A	

== Top 10 grossing Hollywood movies ==
Rank	Film	Studio(s)	Domestic gross (in U.S. Dollars)
1.	Avengers: Age of Ultron	Marvel Studios	$14,097,441
2.	Jurassic World	Universal Studios	$11,130,197
3.	Furious 7	Universal Studios	$9,967,404
4.	Star Wars: The Force Awakens	Lucasfilm Ltd.	$8,073,006
5.	Minions	Universal Studios	$6,597,326
6.	Ant-Man	Marvel Studios	$5,275,663
7.	Cinderella	Walt Disney Studios	$4,702,050
8.	Mission: Impossible – Rogue Nation	Paramount Pictures	$4,700,693
9.	Pitch Perfect 2	Universal Studios	$4,644,512
10.	The Hunger Games: Mockingjay - Part 2	Lionsgate/Pioneer	$4,611,404

Note: This list is incomplete and does not include Tagalog movies and some of the box office figures for Hollywood movies released from January and February 2015 have NO DATA on Box Office Mojo and The Numbers.
