= List of highest-grossing Filipino films in 2012 =

The following are Filipino films that earned at least 50 million pesos in 2012 during their screenings.

Rank	Film	Production outfit	Film released	Domestic gross^{1}	Source
1.	Sisterakas	Star Cinema, Viva Films	December 25	₱ 391,000,000 (est.)	
2.	The Mistress	Star Cinema	September 12	₱ 262,790,230	
3.	This Guy's in Love with U Mare!	Star Cinema, Viva Films	October 10	₱ 249,105,182	
4.	One More Try	Star Cinema	December 25	₱ 205,000,000 (est.)	
5.	ÜnOfficially Yours	Star Cinema	February 15	₱ 157,254,200	
6.	Kimmy Dora and the Temple of Kiyeme	Spring Films, Star Cinema	June 13	₱ 133,963,009	
7.	Si Agimat, si Enteng Kabisote at si Ako	OctoArts Films, GMA Films	December 25	₱ 133,500,000 (est.)	
8.	A Secret Affair	Viva Films	October 24	₱ 118,424,018	
9.	The Healing	Star Cinema	July 25	₱ 104,602,460	
10.	Tiktik: The Aswang Chronicles	GMA Films, Reality Entertainment	October 17	₱ 83,792,136	
11.	24/7 in Love	Star Cinema	November 21	₱ 75,057,886	
12.	The Reunion	Star Cinema	August 15	₱ 68,112,967	
13.	Moron 5 and the Crying Lady	Viva Films, MVP Pictures	April 7	₱ 64,642,363	
14.	Born to Love You	Star Cinema	May 30	₱ 52,022,257	
15.	Corazon: Ang Unang Aswang	Skylight Films, Reality Entertainment	March 14	₱ 51,389,780	
16.	Every Breath U Take	Star Cinema	May 16	₱ 50,191,540	

Note

1. Box Office Mojo, a reliable third party box office revenue tracker, does not track any revenues earned during any Metro Manila Film Festival editions. So the official figures by film entries during the festival are only estimates taken from any recent updates from credible and reliable sources such as a film's production outfit, or from any news agencies. Also, Metropolitan Manila Development Authority (MMDA) did not release the official gross sales of each of the films. To verify the figures, see individual sources for the references.

Color key

- – a Metro Manila Film Festival entry film

Preceded by 2011	Highest-grossing films in the Philippines	Succeeded by 2013
