= Bride for Rent =

- Theatrical movie poster
- Directed by: Mae Czarina Cruz
- Written by: Carmi G. Raymundo; Charlene Grace Bernardo
- Produced by: Charo Santos-Concio; Malou N. Santos
- Starring: Kim Chiu; Xian Lim
- Cinematography: Dan Villegas
- Edited by: Marya Ignacio
- Music by: Cesar Francis S. Concio
- Production company: ABS-CBN Film Productions, Inc.
- Distributed by: Star Cinema
- Release date: January 15, 2014
- Running time: 111 minutes
- Country: Philippines
- Languages: Filipino; English
- Box office: ₱326 million (Domestic gross); US$1,281,815.00 (North American gross)

Bride for Rent is a 2014 Filipino romantic comedy film directed by Mae Czarina Cruz starring Kim Chiu and Xian Lim. It is produced by Star Cinema as its opening salvo for the year. The film achieved numerous milestones: it became the second highest grossing Filipino romantic comedy movie of all-time after It Takes a Man and a Woman; the sixth highest grossing non-MMFF film after Hello, Love, Goodbye, The Hows of Us, Maid in Malacañang, The Unkabogable Praybeyt Benjamin, and It Takes a Man and a Woman; and the highest-grossing Filipino film to be released in January.

The film met both critical and commercial success, earning more than ₱21.2 million in its opening day and broke the ₱200 million pesos mark on its 8th day. The film's trailer became a viral hit prior to the film's premier garnering over 2 million views as of January 25, 2014 and was frequently part of the local Twitter trending topics during its theatrical run. It also received an average rating of 7.5/10 in IMDb and a 3.9/5 in Rotten Tomatoes with 73% liking the said film as of February 12. It was graded "B" by the Cinema Evaluation Board and rated PG by the MTRCB.

== Plot ==
Rocco Espiritu and Rocky Dela Cruz have one thing in common: they are both in need of money, fast.

On the eve of his 25th birthday, the day he's set to receive money from his grandmother, Lala's trust fund, Rocco parties, gets drunk, and loses all his money on a poker match. Now he has to produce the amount, otherwise he will lose the client he needs to defeat his father's TV commercial production company. Meanwhile, Rocky also needs money to pay the rent, otherwise her family will be homeless.

The only way for Rocco to get money from his trust fund is to fulfill the conditions set by his grandmother and that is to get married. That's when he meets Rocky who agrees to act as his pseudo wife in exchange for a “talent fee.” With Rocco's tempting offer and Rocky's need for money, the two seal the deal. However, Lala sees through their ruse but is sympathetic with Rocky, helping her deal with her grandson and officially hiring her to continue the fraud. After a series of slow starts, the "married" couple start an idea to jumpstart their finances by creating a film on relationships featuring married couples.

Rocco develops genuine feelings for Rocky and proposes to her at a dinner with Lala and his father. But Rocky, who feels guilt at having to engage in the fraud, refuses, tells the whole truth and walks out. Lala later urges Rocco to reconcile with his father and seek out Rocky, seeing how they are in love with each other. The two eventually reconcile and marry for real, with both finally stable financially.

== Cast ==
=== Main cast ===
- Kim Chiu as Racquelita "Rocky" Dela Cruz
- Xian Lim as Roderico "Rocco" Espiritu, Jr.

=== Supporting cast ===
- Pilita Corrales as Avelina "Lala" Corazon
- Dennis Padilla as Nito "Papsi" Dela Cruz
- Martin del Rosario as Mik Antonio
- Empoy Marquez as Javier
- Matt Evans as Onyok Dela Cruz
- Eda Nolan as Carding's wife
- Anita Linda as Lola Czarina
- Tony Mabesa as Mr. Benjamin
- Alex Castro as Videoke Male Artist
- Helga Krapf as Gretchen
- Marlann Flores as Bekya
- Zeppi Borromeo as Iking Dela Cruz
- Lloyd Zaragoza as Carding Dela Cruz
- Gerald Pesigan as Mikoy Dela Cruz
- Santino Espinoza as Chin Dela Cruz
- Leo Rialp as Cito Romualdez
- RJ Ledesma as Atty. Marty Llamas

=== Guest cast ===
- Ivan Asuncion as Young Rocco
- Artemio C. Abad Jr. as Videoke Director
- Loven Canon as Marsique
- Patricia Prieto as Tricia
- Mark Mcmahon as Tricia's husband
- Regine "Apan" T. Agra as Kukai
- Angel Remulla as Rocco's mother
- Amelia Villaruel as Maricel
- Jackie Aquino as Rod's wife

=== Special participation ===
- Tirso Cruz III as Roderico "Rod" Espiritu, Sr. (Rocco's father)
- Bodie Cruz as young Roderico Espiritu Sr. (Rocco's father in picture)
- Mr. & Mrs. Eugene and Jacqueline Lopez-Kaw as themselves
- Mr. & Mrs. Gary and MM Bogarin as themselves
- Mr. & Mrs. Nor and Pia Domingo as themselves
- Mr. & Mrs. Ed and Baby Ferriols as themselves
- Mr. & Mrs. Robert and Dina Labayen as themselves
- Mr. & Mrs. Nelson and Millie Villar as themselves
