= My Cactus Heart =

#MyCactusHeart
- Theatrical movie poster
- Directed by: Enrico C. Santos
- Screenplay by: Enrico C. Santos; Ricardo Fernando III; Raz de la Torre; Jerry Gracio
- Story by: Enrico C. Santos
- Based on: Concept by Mary Ann Bautista
- Produced by: Charo Santos-Concio; Malou N. Santos
- Starring: Maja Salvador; Matteo Guidicelli; Xian Lim
- Cinematography: Sherman Philip T. So; Manuel Teehankee
- Edited by: Vanessa Ubas De Leon
- Music by: Cesar Francis S. Concio
- Production companies: ABS-CBN Film Productions; Skylight Films
- Distributed by: Star Cinema
- Release date: January 25, 2012
- Running time: 100 minutes
- Country: Philippines
- Languages: Filipino; English
- Box office: ₱23,008,393.00

My Cactus Heart (stylized as #MyCactusHeart) is a 2012 Filipino romantic comedy film directed by Enrico Santos, starring Maja Salvador, Matteo Guidicelli, and introducing Xian Lim.

It is the first independent film produced by Skylight Films which premiered inside the PBB house on January 24. 2012. It was released nationwide on January 25, 2012.

== Premise ==
Sandy (Maja Salvador) is a hopeless romantic who has dumped many boyfriends and also rejected a number of suitors. Her life changes when she meets Bene (Xian Lim), a handsome heartthrob, at work. However, her friend Carlo (Matteo Guidicelli) will do everything to have her reciprocate his affection.

== Plot ==
My Cactus heart, revolves on Sandy (Maja Salvador), a girl whose heart and mind believes there is only one great perfect love. After discovering the infidelity of her father, she sworn off love, as. She feels she will end up being hurt, just what like her father did to her mother. She has dumped every man she has been in a relationship with, ignored and denied suitors who would love to ask her out. Will it be her friend Carlo (Matteo Guidicelli), a waiter of a family business, who is repeatedly rejected by Sandy, but doesn't take NO for an answer, or her handsome new co-worker Benedict (Xian Lim)?

== Cast ==
=== Main cast ===
- Maja Salvador as Sandra 'Sandy'
- Matteo Guidicelli as Carlo
- Xian Lim as Benedict

=== Supporting cast ===
- Ramon Christopher as Facundo
- Rosanna Roces as Margaret
- Ricky Davao as Dan
- Joy Viado† as Tita Au
- Pinky Amador as Carol
- Bettina Carlos as Anna
- Kristel Moreno as Lucy
- Franzen Fajardo as Tommy
- Beatriz Saw as Arianna
- Lemuel Pelayo as Kale
- Mariel Pamintuan as Heart
- Niña Dolino as Helena
- Gee Canlas as Johanna
- Ervic Vijandre as Romeo
- JM de Guzman as Valentin
- Cecil Paz as Lindsay

== Box office ==
#MyCactusHeart had a total gross receipts of P23,008,393, as of its third week. It ranked 4th Top Grossing Indie Film of 2012 and one of the 20 Top Grossing Filipino films of 2012.

It is one of the most successful indie films of 2012 beating other mainstream films of GMA Films, Viva Films, and Regal Films.

== Soundtrack ==
Star Records released the soundtrack of the movie, containing 12 tracks. Sam Milby made a cover of "Kaba", which was originally sung by Tootsie Guevarra for the film's soundtrack album, however, in the official music video, it was sung by Matteo Guidicelli.
