= Tum, My Pledge of Love =

2011 film by Robin Padilla

Tum: My Pledge of Love
- Theatrical release poster
- Directed by: Robin Padilla
- Screenplay by: Robin Padilla; Mariel Rodriguez
- Story by: Robin Padilla
- Produced by: Rema Padilla-Ohno; Sameer Raza
- Starring: Robin Padilla; Mariel Rodriguez
- Production companies: Star Cinema; Liwanag ng Kapayapaan Foundation Philippines; R.R. Foundation India
- Distributed by: ABS-CBN Film Productions (Philippines) (Note: Distributed under the joint label, Star Cinema/ABS-CBN Film Productions. As of recent, Viva Films acquired the rights of the movie.); Fox International Productions (international)
- Release date: April 6, 2011
- Running time: 115 minutes
- Country: Philippines
- Languages: Filipino; Hindi; English
- Box office: ₱5.16 million (US$119,580.00)

Tum: My Pledge of Love is a 2011 Philippine film directed by Robin Padilla in his directorial debut and starring Padilla, Mariel Rodriguez, Queenie Padilla and Ejay Falcon.

== Plot ==
The film is about a Filipina named Erlinda Dimatumba (Mariel Rodriguez), who, because of the heartbreak and deception of an arranged marriage orchestrated by her parents, flees the country as a United Nations volunteer. Somehow she reaches India where she develops a very close father-and-daughter relationship with a wealthy Indian philanthropist. Upon his death he gives her his school where she teaches and cares for poor children.

The death of the wealthy philanthropist prompts his son, half-Pinoy, half-Indian Ravaan Raza (Robin Padilla) to return to India from the Philippines. Ravaan is told that he can only get his father's mega millions of inheritance if he marries Linda, an arrangement she's unaware of. This is also the condition before Linda can take full control of the school, and she loves the school so much that she agrees to the marriage even if she loathes Ravaan with a passion.

== Cast ==
- Robin Padilla as Ravaan Raza
- Mariel Rodriguez as Erlinda Dimatumba
- Queenie Padilla as Gheeta
- Ejay Falcon as Ibrahim Mata

== Production ==
The film is set in Alipur, Karnataka and was shot in India, including the Mysore Palace and Taj Mahal, the same place where Padilla and Rodriguez had their honeymoon.

On April 4, 2011, the film's preview was released during the airing of SNN: Showbiz News Ngayon.

== Release and reception ==
The film was released on April 6, 2011. It earned US$119,580 on its total gross and is a box office bomb.

=== Critical response ===
The film received mostly mixed reviews. Shiela Reyes of the ABS-CBN News wrote "While the ending is a little predictable, the movie was generally well-crafted, the storytelling fluid, and it was a visual treat.". Earl Villanueva of the Philippine Entertainment Portal wrote "But not all's that bad in this production. The costumes and production design are breathtaking and marvelous." Philbert Ortiz Dy of the ClickTheCity.com gave the film 2/5 stars and wrote "Tum is truly a singular vision, and that might just be the problem. "

== See also ==
- List of Philippine films
