= John Lloyd Cruz =

Filipino actor (born 1983)

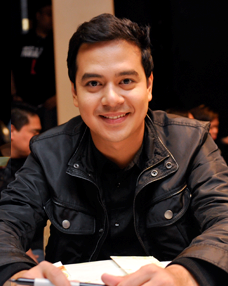
- Cruz in 2010
- Born: John Lloyd Espidol Cruz; June 24, 1983 (age 43); Pasay, Metro Manila, Philippines
- Occupation: Actor
- Years active: 1997–present
- Agents: ABS-CBN (1996–2017) GMA Network (2021–present); Crown Artist Management (2021–2025)
- Children: 1
- Awards: Full list

John Lloyd Espidol Cruz (born June 24, 1983) is a Filipino actor. Regarded as the "King of Contemporary Cinema" by the media, Cruz has top-billed several box-office successes. He has more than ten films with box office grosses of ₱100 million in the Philippines.

CNN Philippines described Cruz as "the quintessential image of the contemporary leading man." He began acting at the age of 15 and has over 30 productions to his credit. A breakthrough role on the soap opera Kay Tagal Kang Hinintay (2002–2003), where he first started working with actress and frequent co-star Bea Alonzo, followed his starring role in the television drama Tabing Ilog (1999–2003), which he appeared in as a teenager. With around 80 awards won throughout his career including two FAMAS Awards and two Gawad Urian Awards, Cruz is one of the most-awarded Filipino actors. He was the first Filipino and Southeast Asian actor to receive the Star Asia Award at the New York Asian Film Festival. He was the fifth highest-grossing Filipino actor in the 2010s, raking over a total of ₱2.3 billion in box office receipts. His 2015 film A Second Chance grossed over ₱556 million which makes it one of the highest grossing Philippine films in history.

== Background ==
John Lloyd Espidol Cruz is the youngest child of Luisito Llora and Aida Espidol Cruz. He was known by the nickname "Idan" among his family and some close friends. Cruz finished his grade school at Marikina Catholic School in 1996. He was later discovered by a talent scout in a mall while there with some friends to see the film Magic Temple. Due to his father's failing marble business, Cruz decided to enter showbiz to help his family recover from financial problems. He first appeared in GMA Public Affairs' reenactment legal talk show Compañero y Compañera, followed by the crime and investigative series Calvento Files. This was followed by several guest appearances and shows. At age 14, Cruz became a member of ABS-CBN's Star Magic, where he became an alumnus of Batch 5. He was also a member of the then-teen trio called Koolits with Baron Geisler and Marc Solis.

== Television career ==
Since he started his showbiz career in 1996, he was a contract talent for ABS-CBN.

In 1998, he played Jojo in Sa Sandaling Kailangan Mo Ako, a short-lived weekly miniseries.

In 1999, Cruz played the role of Rovic in the teen drama Tabing Ilog, alongside Kaye Abad, which lasted for more than four years. His breakthrough role came in 2002 by portraying the character of Yuri in Kay Tagal Kang Hinintay, where he is paired with Bea Alonzo. He was later cast in It Might Be You and Ikaw ang Lahat sa Akin.

In 2006, Cruz was cast in the highly successful soap opera Maging Sino Ka Man along with Bea Alonzo, Anne Curtis and Sam Milby. In early 2007, he began endorsing Unilab's medication Paracetamol (Biogesic). In 2009, he made another collaboration with Bea Alonzo and played the male protagonist Armando in I Love Betty La Fea, a Philippine adaptation of the Colombian telenovela Yo Soy Betty La Fea. In 2010, Cruz was paired with Angel Locsin in the critically acclaimed dark fantasy series Imortal, a sequel of the original series Lobo.

As a TV host, Cruz had recurring appearances in the longest-running Sunday noontime variety show, ASAP. He was also recruited as one of four members of the Kanto Boys alongside ASAP mainstays Vhong Navarro, Billy Crawford and Luis Manzano.

In 2014, Cruz played the role of Romeo in the Saturday sitcom series Home Sweetie Home with Toni Gonzaga, which lasted until he left the show in 2017. He went on indefinite leave from show business after a controversial relationship with model and actress Ellen Adarna, who was his fellow co-star in Home Sweetie Home. Since 2019, Cruz makes occasional cameos in commercial ads.

On May 16, 2021, he signed up with Crown Artist Management. The following month, he made an appearance at GMA's broadcast of Shopee's "6.6. Mid-year Sale" TV event. On November 9, 2021, he officially signed a contract with GMA Network as part of his TV comeback. He starred in the Sunday sitcom Happy Together (pronounced as Happy To Get Her) which aired until August 2023.

== Film career ==
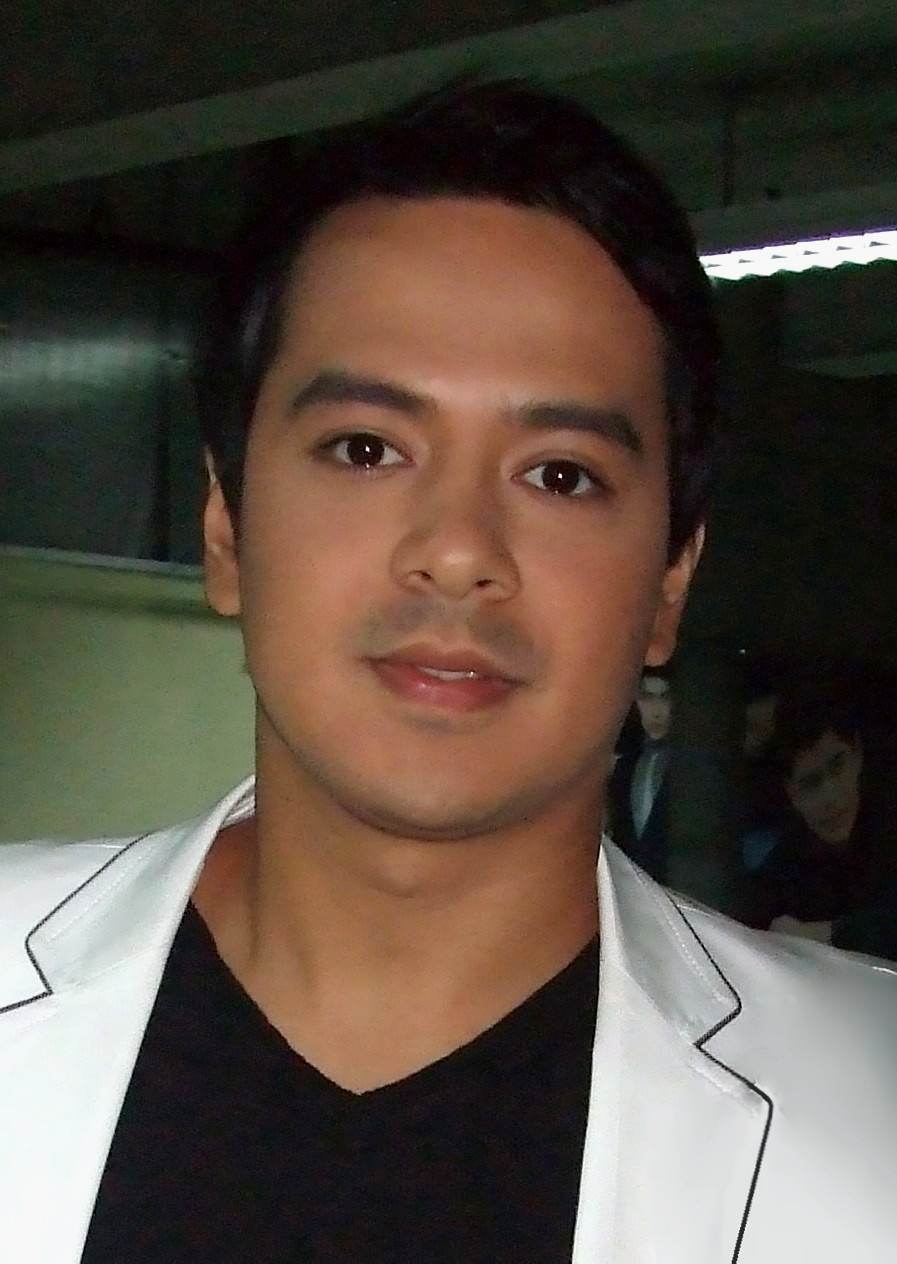
John Lloyd Cruz at the ABS-CBN Talent Center, May 2010.

John Lloyd Cruz starred with Sarah Geronimo in A Very Special Love produced by Star Cinema and Viva Films, which was released on July 30, 2008. The film grossed ₱185 million at the box office. In February 2009, Cruz's follow-up movie with Geronimo, You Changed My Life, a sequel to A Very Special Love also produced by Star Cinema and Viva Films, hit the box office. The film's total theatrical earnings reached ₱240 million and was ranked as the highest grossing Filipino film of all time in that same year. In mid-2009, he shifted from his regular roles for a more controversial, challenging project with Vilma Santos, in which he portrayed Luis Manzano's lover in the movie In My Life. Cruz has been nailed as the "Box-Office King" for three-consecutive years: in 2007 for One More Chance, in 2008 with A Very Special Love, and in 2009 with You Changed My Life, which became the top-grossing film of his career during that time until approximately six years later.

Cruz's reunion movie with love team partner Bea Alonzo, Miss You Like Crazy, released in February 2010 as Star Cinema's post-office offering, was a box office hit earning more than ₱140 million in its seven-week run and still the second top Filipino movie of 2010. He was later paired again with Toni Gonzaga in another box-office film titled My Amnesia Girl that earned ₱12.8 million on its first day (November 2010) and surpassing 100 million in its first-week run. It was directed by the box-office director Cathy Garcia Molina. It earned ₱165 million in its one-month run and was the top-grossing film of 2010. Plans for making a movie with the Kanto Boys of ASAP was proposed for 2011 but was never pushed through. In 2012, Cruz and Alonzo starred in the film The Mistress to celebrate their 10th anniversary as a love team. The Mistress was critically acclaimed, leaving a total box-office gross of ₱260 million and being the third highest grossing Filipino film of all time. He then reunites again with Geronimo for It Takes a Man and a Woman, a third and final sequel of the films A Very Special Love and You Changed My Life, which was released in 2013.

In 2015, Cruz starred and produced a thriller movie Honor Thy Father, which was first screened in the Contemporary World Cinema section of the 2015 Toronto International Film Festival. He plays the part of a man who, after a period of estrangement from his family, returns home to seek their help when his wife gets them into trouble with violent investors whose money her dad had lost in a ponzi scheme. Also in that same year, Cruz and Alonzo starred again together in the movie A Second Chance, the sequel of highly successful 2007 film One More Chance. The film was released on November 25, 2015, and earned ₱556 million, becoming the highest grossing Filipino film of 2015.

Cruz has been also recognized as one of three honorees of the Star Asia award at the 15th New York Asian Film Festival (NYAFF). He is the first Filipino and Southeast Asian actor to receive the honor. He joins Hong Kong's Miriam Yeung and South Korea's Lee Byung-hun – all box office stars in their own countries – as that year's recipients of the award.

Cruz won the Boccalino d’Oro prize or Golden Jug Award for Best Actor for his lead role in Lav Diaz’s "Essential Truths of The Lake", 76th Locarno Film Festival on August 11, 2023.

== Other ventures ==
=== Business ===
Cruz launched his mobile app, Trike Now, a tricycle booking app in 2021.

== Personal life ==
Cruz has dated numerous personalities in the past, which include actresses Kaye Abad, Krista Ranillo, Ciara Sotto, Heart Evangelista, Ruffa Gutierrez, Shaina Magdayao, Angelica Panganiban and Ellen Adarna. He also dated stylist Liz Uy in late 2006.

Cruz has a son with Adarna named Elias Modesto. In December, Elias performed a piano recital under teacher Ryan Aviso. The coparenting couples officially published their son's 2024 graduation yearbook.

In 2023, Cruz confirmed his relationship with visual artist Isabel Santos after romance rumors surfaced in 2021.

== Filmography ==
=== Film ===
Year	Film	Role	Notes and Awards
1997	Ikaw Pala ang Mahal Ko	Robin Gatmaitan	
1998	Nagbibinata	G-Boy Velasco	
1999	Oo Na, Mahal Na Kung Mahal	Igi Boy	
1999	Gimik: The Reunion	Junie De Dios	
2002	Forevermore	Boyet	
2003	My First Romance	Enzo	Chapter: "Two Hearts"
2004	Now That I Have You	Michael Morelos	Nominated—ENPRESS Golden Screen Award for Best Performance by an Actor in a Leading Role (Musical or Comedy)
2005	Dubai	Andrew "Kasmot" Alvarez	GMMSF Box-Office Entertainment Award for Film Actor of the Year; FAMAS Award for Best Supporting Actor PMPC Star Award for Movies for Movie Supporting Actor of the Year; Nominated—FAP Luna Award for Best Supporting Actor; Nominated—Gawad PASADO Award for Best Supporting Actor; Nominated—Gawad TANGLAW Award for Best Supporting Actor; Nominated—Gawad URIAN Award for Best Supporting Actor; Nominated—U.P. Film Desk of the Young Critics Circle Award for Movies for Best Supporting Actor
2006	Close to You	Manuel "Palits" Soriano	Nominated—ENPRESS Golden Screen Award for Best Performance by an Actor in a Leading Role (Musical or Comedy)
2006	All About Love	Eric	"About Anna"; FAP Luna Award for Best Actor
2007	One More Chance	Rodolfo "Popoy" Gonzales Jr.	GMMSF Box-Office Entertainment Award for Box-Office King; ASAP Pop Viewer's Choice Award for Pop Love Team (shared with Bea Alonzo); ASAP Pop Viewer's Choice Award for Pop Screen Kiss (shared with Bea Alonzo); ENPRESS Golden Screen Award for Best Performance by an Actor in a Leading Role (Drama); Nominated—FAMAS Award for Best Actor; Nominated—FAP Luna Award for Best Actor; Nominated—PMPC Star Award for Movies for Movie Actor of the Year
2007	Still Life	Himself	Cameo; Official Indie film entry for Cinemalaya 2007
2008	A Very Special Love	Miguel "Miggy" Montenegro	GMMSF Box-Office Entertainment Award for Box-Office King; Nominated—ENPRESS Golden Screen Award for Best Performance by an Actor in a Leading Role (Musical or Comedy); Nominated—FAP Luna Award for Best Actor; Nominated—Gawad PASADO Award for Best Actor; Nominated—PMPC Star Award for Movies for Movie Actor of the Year
2008	My Only U	Miggy	Cameo
2009	You Changed My Life	Miguel "Miggy" Montenegro	GMMSF Box-Office Entertainment Award for Box-Office King; Nominated—ENPRESS Golden Screen Award for Best Performance by an Actor in a Leading Role (Musical or Comedy)
2009	In My Life	Noel Villanueva	Gawad PASADO Award for Best Actor; Gawad TANGLAW Award for Best Actor; GMMSF Box-Office Entertainment Award for Film Actors of the Year(shared with Luis Manzano); MTRCB Movie Awards for Best Supporting Actor; PMPC Star Award for Movies for Movie Actor of the Year; Nominated—ENPRESS Golden Screen Award for Best Performance by an Actor in a Leading Role (Drama); Nominated—FAMAS Award for Best Actor; Nominated—Gawad URIAN Award for Best Actor
2009	T2	Gary	Cameo
2010	Miss You Like Crazy	Allan Alvarez	FAMAS Award for Best Actor; GMMSF Box-Office Entertainment Award for Film Actor of the Year; Nominated—ENPRESS Golden Screen Award for Best Performance by an Actor in a Leading Role (Drama); Nominated—Gawad TANGLAW Award for Best Actor; Nominated—Gawad URIAN Award for Best Actor; Nominated—PMPC Star Award for Movies for Movie Actor of the Year
2010	My Amnesia Girl	Apollo	SM Cinemas Award for Box Office King; Nominated—ENPRESS Golden Screen Award for Best Performance by an Actor in a Leading Role (Musical or Comedy)
2012	ÜnOfficially Yours	Mackie Galvez	
2012	The Mistress	Frederico "JD" Torres	GMMSF Box-Office Entertainment Award for Box-Office King
2012	24/7 in Love	Elvis Monzon	
2013	It Takes A Man And A Woman	Miguel "Miggy" Montenegro	GMMSF Box-Office Entertainment Award for Box-Office King; Nominated-- FAMAS Award for Best Actor
2013	Bromance: My Brother's Romance	Wedding guest	Cameo
2014	The Trial	Ronald Jimenez Jr.	Gawad PASADO Award for Best Actor; 31st Star Awards for Movies for Movie Actor Of The Year; 46th Guillermo Mendoza Box-Office Entertainment Awards for Film Actor Of The Year
2015	A Second Chance	Rodolfo "Popoy" Gonzales Jr.	
2015	Honor Thy Father	Edgar	2015 Metro Manila Film Festival entry Gawad Urian for Best Actor; Nominated-Metro Manila Film Festival Award for Best Actor; Nominated—FAP Luna Award for Best Actor
2016	A Lullaby to the Sorrowful Mystery	Isagani	
2016	Just the 3 of Us	Uno Abusado	
2016	The Woman Who Left	Hollanda	
2017	Finally Found Someone	Rafael "Raffy" Sandoval	
2019	Culion		Special participation 2019 Metro Manila Film Festival entry
2021	Historya ni Ha	Hernando / Ha	
2022	Isang Salaysay ng Karahasang Pilipino	Servando Monzon	
2022	Kapag Wala Nang Mga Alon	Lieutenant Hermes Papauran	
2023	Essential Truths of the Lake	Lieutenant Hermes Papauran	
2024	Moneyslapper	Daniel	

=== Television ===
Year	Title	Role
1997–2017; 2019–2021	ASAP	Himself/Performer
1997	Palibhasa Lalake	Himself
1998–1999	Sa Sandaling Kailangan Mo Ako	Jojo
1997–1999	Gimik	Junie de Dios
1999–2003	Tabing Ilog	Ronaldo Victor "Rovic" Mercado
2000	Maalaala Mo Kaya: Peanut Butter	Itoy
2000	Maalaala Mo Kaya: Burger Joint	Ryan
2000	Kakabakaba: Sumalangit Nawa	
2001	Sa Dulo Ng Walang Hanggan	Emilio Bustamante
2001–2002	Sa Puso Ko Iingatan Ka	Adrian Montecillo
2002–2003	Kay Tagal Kang Hinintay	Yuri Orbida
2003	Star Studio Presents: Suyuan sa Lalawigan	Leon
2003–2004	It Might Be You	Earl Lawrence Trinidad
2004	Maalaala Mo Kaya: Lapis	Justin
2005	Maalaala Mo Kaya: Upuan	Lino Cayetano
2005	Ikaw ang Lahat sa Akin	Oliver Ynares
2005	Maalaala Mo Kaya: Skating Rink	Jonel
2006	Maalaala Mo Kaya: Greeting Card	Raymund Narag
2006	Maalaala Mo Kaya: Kwintas	Jason
2006	Komiks: Bampy	Himself
2006–2007	Maging Sino Ka Man	Gabriel "Eli" Davide
2006	Star Magic Presents: My Angel	Martin
2007–2008	Maging Sino Ka Man: Ang Pagbabalik	Gabriel "Eli" Hidalgo Roxas
2008	Banana Split	Himself/Guest
2008–2009	I Love Betty La Fea	Armando Solis
2008	Maalaala Mo Kaya: Pedicab	Chris
2010–2011	Imortal	Mateo Rodriguez
2011	100 Days to Heaven	Jack de Guzman
2012–2013	A Beautiful Affair	Napoleon "Leon" Riego
2014–2017	Home Sweetie Home	Romeo Valentino
2015	Maalaala Mo Kaya:	Tarik
2015	Nathaniel	Atty. Francisco Lucas
2017	La Luna Sangre	Mateo Rodriguez
2021	Ang Fraile	Pepito
2021–2023	Happy Together	Julian Rodriguez
