= List of highest-grossing Filipino films in 2011 =

This is a list of Filipino films released on 2011 ranked according to its domestic grosses.

Filipino Films of 2011
Rank	Movie	Gross	Production	Distribution	Source
1	The Unkabogable Praybeyt Benjamin	P452.07-M	Star Cinema; Viva Films	Star Cinema; Viva Films	BOM
2	No Other Woman	P276.80-M	Star Cinema; Viva Films	Star Cinema; Viva Films	BOM
3	Catch Me... I'm in Love	P120.21-M	Star Cinema; Viva Films	Star Cinema; Viva Films	BOM
4	In the Name of Love	P117.23-M	Star Cinema	Star Cinema	BOM
5	Won't Last A Day Without You	P87.01-M	Star Cinema; Viva Films	Star Cinema; Viva Films	BOM
6	Pak! Pak! My Dr. Kwak!	P77.15-M	APT Entertainment; M-Zet Productions; OctoArts Films; Star Cinema	Star Cinema	BOM
7	Bulong	P69.7-M	Star Cinema	Star Cinema	BOM
8	Temptation Island	P61-M	Regal Films; GMA Films	Regal Films; GMA Films	BOM
9	Who's That Girl	P58.31-M	Viva Films	Viva Films	BOM
10	Forever and a Day	P44.73-M	Star Cinema	Star Cinema	BOM
11	My Valentine Girls	P44.26-M	Regal Films; GMA Films	Regal Films; GMA Films	BOM
12	Wedding Tayo, Wedding Hindi	P37.46-M	Star Cinema; OctoArts Films	Star Cinema	BOM
13	The Road	P36.85-M	GMA Films	GMA Films	BOM
14	Zombadings 1: Patayin sa Shokot si Remington	P32.28-M	Origin8Media; SQ Film Laboratories; PostManila	Origin8Media	BOM
15	Tween Academy: Class of 2012	P32.23-M	SM Development Corp. GMA Films	GMA Films	BOM
16	Aswang	P31.28-M	Regal Films	Regal Films	BOM
17	Ang Babae Sa Septic Tank	P30.26-M	Cinemalaya, Martinez-Rivera Films, Quantum Films, Straight Shooters Media	Star Cinema	BOM
18	My Neighbor's Wife	P27.56-M	Regal Films	Regal Films	BOM
19	Way Back Home	P25.78-M	Star Cinema	Star Cinema	BOM
20	The Adventures of Pureza: Queen of the Riles	P19.8-M	Sine Screen; Star Cinema	Star Cinema	BOM
21	Tumbok	P10.53-M	Viva Films	Viva Films	BOM
22	Ikaw Ang Pag-ibig	P5.5-M	Archdiocese of Caceres, Marilou Diaz-Abaya Film Institute and Arts Center	Star Cinema	BOM
23	Tum: My Pledge of Love	P5.16-M	R.R. Foundation India, Liwanag ng Kapayapaan Foundation Productions	Star Cinema	BOM
24	Thelma	P1.35-M	Time Horizon Pictures, Abracadabra Productions, Underground Logic	Star Cinema	BOM

== Independent Films ==
Independent Films of 2011
Rank	Movie	Gross	Production	Distribution	Source
1	Zombadings 1: Patayin sa Shokot si Remington	P32.28-M	Origin8Media; SQ Film Laboratories; PostManila	Origin8Media	BOM
2	Ang Babae Sa Septic Tank	P30.26-M	Cinemalaya, Martinez-Rivera Films, Quantum Films, Straight Shooters Media	Star Cinema	BOM
4	Ikaw Ang Pag-ibig	P5.5-M	Archdiocese of Caceres, Marilou Diaz-Abaya Film Institute and Arts Center	Star Cinema	BOM
5	Tum: My Pledge of Love	P5.16-M	R.R. Foundation India, Liwanag ng Kapayapaan Foundation Productions	Star Cinema	BOM
6	Thelma	P1.35-M	Time Horizon Pictures, Abracadabra Productions, Underground Logic	Star Cinema	BOM

check also:

== MMFF ==
2011 Metro Manila Film Festival (December 25, 2011 - January 7, 2012)
Rank	Movie	Gross	Production	Distribution	Source
1	Enteng Ng Ina Mo	P237.87-M	Star Cinema; OctoArts Films; MZet Productions; APT Entertainment	Star Cinema; OctoArts Films; MZet Productions; APT Entertainment	MMDA
2	Segunda Mano	P126.63-M	Star Cinema; AgostoDos Pictures; MJM Productions	Star Cinema	MMDA
3	Ang Panday 2	P105.60-M	Imus Productions; GMA Films	GMA Films	MMDA
4	My House Husband: Ikaw Na!	P62.07-M	OctoArts Films	OctoArts Films	MMDA
5	Shake, Rattle & Roll 13	P55.48-M	Regal Films	Regal Films	MMDA
6	Manila Kingpin: The Asiong Salonga Story	P38.43-M	Scenema Concept International; Viva Films	Viva Films	MMDA
7	Yesterday, Today, Tomorrow	P10.68-M	Regal Films	Regal Films	MMDA

note: MMFF Films's gross are just partial within December 25, 2011 - January 7, 2012 period only.

Preceded by 2010	Highest-grossing films in the Philippines	Succeeded by 2012
