= Starting Over Again (2014 film) =

- Theatrical movie poster
- Directed by: Olivia M. Lamasan
- Screenplay by: Carmi G. Raymundo; Olivia M. Lamasan
- Story by: Carmi G. Raymundo; Olivia M. Lamasan; Anjeli Pessumal
- Produced by: Charo Santos-Concio; Malou N. Santos
- Starring: Piolo Pascual; Toni Gonzaga; Iza Calzado
- Cinematography: Hermann Claravall
- Edited by: Marya Ignacio
- Music by: Cesar Francis S. Concio
- Production company: Star Cinema
- Distributed by: ABS-CBN Film Productions
- Release dates: February 12, 2014 (Philippines); February 21, 2014 (North America); March 6, 2014 (Australia and the Middle East)
- Running time: 130 minutes
- Country: Philippines
- Language: Filipino
- Box office: ₱579 million

Starting Over Again is a 2014 Filipino romantic comedy film directed by Olivia M. Lamasan from a story and screenplay she co-wrote with Carmi G. Raymundo and Anjeli Pessumal. Starring Piolo Pascual, Toni Gonzaga, and Iza Calzado, the story follows a whirlwind romance between a former architecture student and a history professor, who later met again through a project years later.

Produced and distributed by ABS-CBN Film Productions for its 20th founding anniversary, the film was theatrically released in the Philippines on February 12, 2014. It became a box-office success, earning ₱25 million on its opening day, and overall, it earned a total domestic gross of ₱410 million.

== Synopsis ==
The story revolves around the relationship between Ginny and Marco. Ginny is an architecture student, and Marco is a history professor who proposes marriage to his girlfriend of five years. However, Ginny rejects Marco's marriage proposal to pursue her master's degree in Architecture overseas. Years later, the two former lovers meet again through a project, and the plot goes over flashbacks - an email, a backstory, and the self-esteem of moving on, letting go, and redemption.

== Cast ==
=== Main cast ===
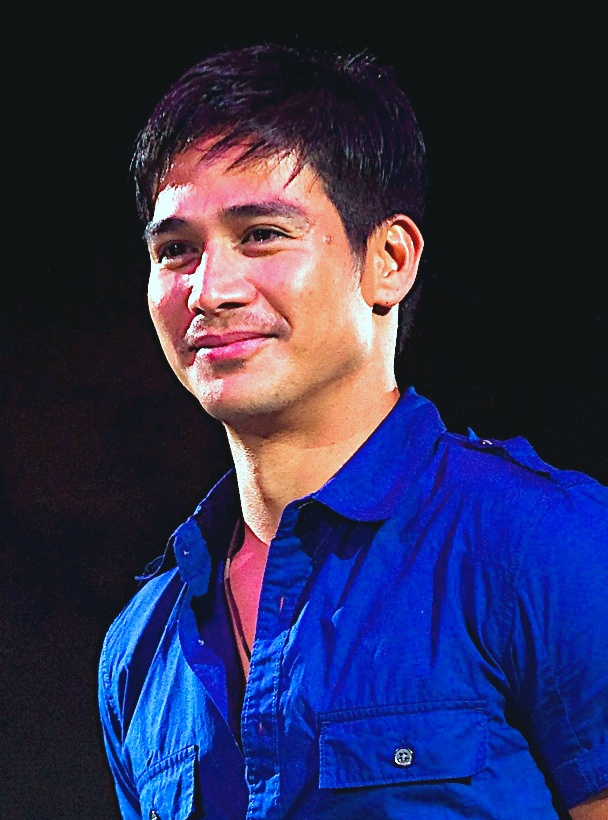
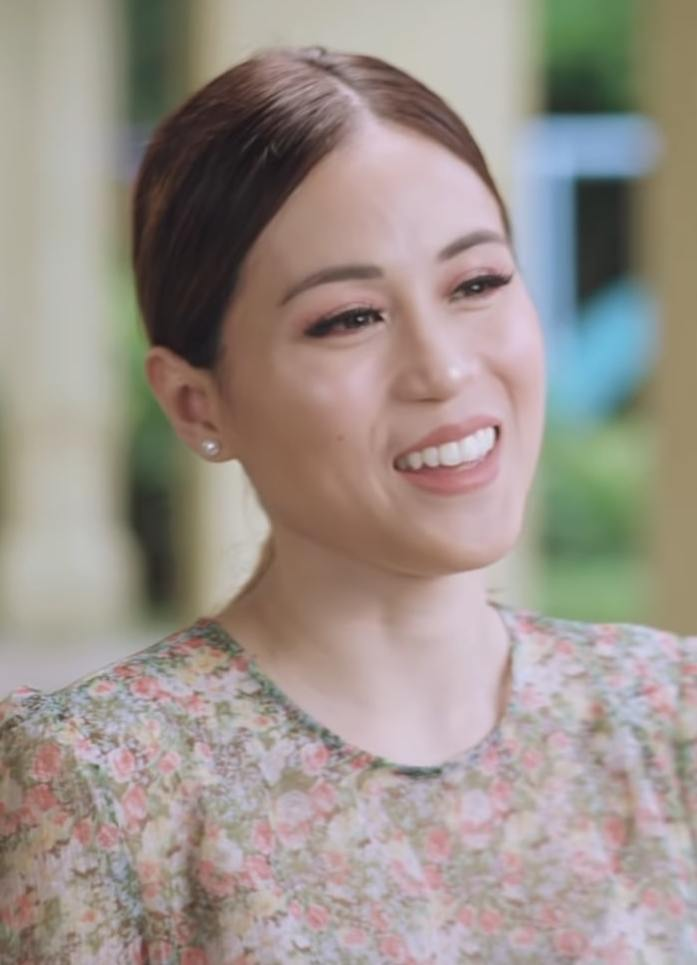
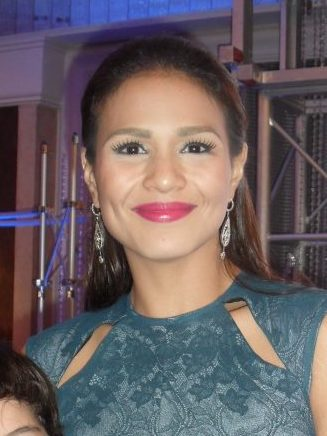
The three lead stars (from left to right): Piolo Pascual, Toni Gonzaga, and Iza Calzado.
- Piolo Pascual as Marco Antonio Villanueva III
- Toni Gonzaga as Genina "Ginny" Gonzales
- Iza Calzado as Patricia "Patty" de Guia

=== Supporting cast ===
- Joross Gamboa as Ali
- Edgar Allan Guzman as Babas
- Cai Cortez as Beb
- Beauty Gonzalez as Wella
- Bryan Santos as Migo Maniego
- Lito Pimentel as Tatay Ben
- Yayo Aguila as Ginny's mother
- Liza Lorena as Marco's grandmother
- Jonah Zapata-Tan as Taong Grasa

=== Cameos ===
- Vhong Navarro as Chef
- Luis Manzano as Professor
- Sam Milby as Engr. Raffy Ariza
- Paul Soriano as Engr. Martin Cojuangco

== Production ==
Development began eight months prior the release date with a working title of "Unlove You." The film was written by Carmi Raymundo who was behind some of Star Cinema films like It Takes a Man and a Woman released in 2013, and Bride for Rent released in January 2014. According to Raymundo, her vision of the film was to stray away from traditional Filipino love stories (which are already too mainstream in the Philippine market) so the film was created to tell a love story with a twist. The film was directed and produced by Olivia Lamasan, the woman behind successful films such as Madrasta (1996), Minsan, Minahal Kita (2000), Milan (2004), In My Life (2009), In the Name of Love (2011) and The Mistress (2012). According to Lamasan, the film was about a lover wishing for a second chance. Despite being the head of ABS-CBN's creative department, Lamasan was told to do a film that would fit Pascual to make their reunion worth it since they haven't done any projects for the last decade. The film also served as a reunion not only with Pascual and Lamasan, but for the lead actor and actress as well. Their first collaboration was 13 years ago in a soda commercial. In an article by Crispina Martinez-Belen of the Manila Bulletin, it was stated that Malou Santos personally chose Gonzaga to portray the lead role.

== Music ==
Filipina singer Lani Misalucha covered the Natalie Cole song, "Starting Over Again" as the movie's theme song.

== Marketing ==
The official trailer was released on YouTube on January 18, 2014, and quickly became popular.

== Release ==
The Starting Over Again red carpet premiere in the Philippines was attended by its principal cast members at the SM Megamall on February 10, 2014. The film was then commercially screened on February 12, 2014. The film also had a North American premiere held at the Fox Theatre in Redwood City, California, United States on February 15, 2014. It was later released commercially starting February 21 to 27 in the United States, February 21 to March 6 in Canada, March 6 in Australia and the Middle East, specifically in Dubai, Qatar and Bahrain.

=== Critical reception ===
According to a review by Bubbles Salvador of the Philippine Entertainment Portal on February 15, 2014, Salvador praised the film for having all elements of a romantic movie. It was well directed by a renowned director, it had great chemistry between the lead actors, and there were funny scenes that will surely provide a few laughs. Salvador also added, "But it seems that’s all there is to it as the film clearly chose to stick to the tried and tested formula, leaving viewers with nothing new. That is, aside from the fact that the movie veers from the typical love story timeline (boy meets girl, they get together, girl leaves boy, they get back together), plus there's also an attempt to put a twist to the ending." Salvador's reviews were also similar to Rito P. Asilo's review in the Philippine Daily Inquirer. Asilo wrote, "The film’s romantic three-way premise is by no means original, but Lamasan makes it work because she has no trouble making its fusion of potent drama and self-deprecating comedy (a running gag about the Virgin Mary is particularly hilarious) settle into a coherent and "relatable" story that doesn't undermine viewers' intelligence and sense of morality." Aya Tantiangco's review on Spot.PH noted the film's similarity with One More Chance in terms of story and character. Tantiangco awarded the film 3.5 out of 5 stars and said that it is a "funny" and well-written romantic-comedy flick. However, she criticizes Gonzaga's character as "shallow," but noted Pascual's character as "mature" and "outstanding."

Rappler's Zig Marasigan praised how the pacing of the movie went, making the audience realize that a perfect love story can also have flaws. He also called the story "realistic, satisfying, and brave". However, he criticizes the film's tone and said that it is questionable inserting comedy in a dramatic and painful scene. Florence Hibionada of The Daily Guardian said that the scenes are "memorable" and worth it. She also noted the film's unpredictability and sense of direction. Rianne Hill Soriano of Yahoo! Voices expressed dismay at most scenes that she described as "annoying." She criticizes the pre-climax scenes as "lame" and the hospital scene for the character's closure as "disappointing." Philbert Ortiz-Dy of ClickTheCity.com awarded the film 2 stars out of 5, stating that the supposedly mature film turned to a completely novice-made one. He also stressed that it "failed to take its own advice," wherein the film ended up the old way.

=== Box office ===
The film earned 25 million pesos on its opening day. After four days, the film earned 150 million pesos after being shown in over 270 cinemas nationwide. It earned another 50 million pesos on its fifth day, earning a total gross of 200 million pesos. On March 3, 2014, eighteen days after its theatrical release, the film earned a total domestic gross of 360 million pesos. According to Box Office Mojo International, the film was consistently number one in the box office since February 19 to 23. On March 15, 2014, after a month since it was released, the film had already earned 410 million pesos.

As of April 1, 2014, the film has already earned US$ 1,741,838 or PHP 78.38 million pesos in the United States after being screened in 52 cinemas and theaters, according to Los Angeles-based Hollywood news site, moviecitynews.com.

== See also ==
- Last Night
