= Corazon: Ang Unang Aswang =

- Theatrical movie poster
- Directed by: Richard V. Somes
- Screenplay by: Richard V. Somes; Jerry Gracio
- Story by: Richard V. Somes
- Produced by: Lea A. Calmerin; Kara U. Kintanar; Marizel Samson-Martinez
- Starring: Erich Gonzales; Derek Ramsay; Mark Gil; Tetchie Agbayani
- Cinematography: Hermann Claravall
- Edited by: Angeli Laparan; Borgy Torre
- Music by: Von de Guzman
- Production companies: Star Cinema; Skylight Films; Reality Entertainment
- Distributed by: Star Cinema
- Release date: March 14, 2012
- Country: Philippines
- Language: Filipino
- Box office: ₱51,413,960.00

Corazon: Ang Unang Aswang (lit. '"Corazon: The First Aswang"'), or simply Corazon, is a 2012 Filipino psychological thriller film starring Erich Gonzales and Derek Ramsay. It is the second film produced by Skylight Films, and released by Star Cinema.

== Plot ==
In the 1950s, Corazon, a woman rumoured to have been a prostitute during the Second World War, struggles to conceive a child with her devoted husband Daniel while being shunned by the villagers of Magdalena. After following a faith healer's advice, she becomes pregnant but gives birth to a stillborn baby. The loss destroys her religious faith and drives her insane, leading her to kill and devour village children at night, beginning with her own child's remains. She disappears into the forest, leaving Daniel distraught, and becomes feral, developing enhanced physical abilities.

After Corazon is identified and wounded during a failed attack, the villagers demand that Daniel find her. Refusing to believe his wife's involvement, Daniel tells his friend Naldo that he once witnessed their abusive landlord Matias and his henchmen killing another villager in a similar manner. Corazon later attacks Nene, a girl who had befriended her, but spares her when Nene reminds her of her former life. Regaining some of her humanity, Corazon becomes distressed by her condition and Daniel's suffering, occasionally approaching him in secret.

As the villagers prepare to rebel against Matias, Corazon is drawn to the cries of his daughter Lisa and breaks into his house, killing her. Matias shoots Corazon as she escapes and, seeing her flee with the dead child, convinces the villagers of her guilt. Matias, his men and the villagers confront Daniel and burn down his house. Daniel retaliates by killing Matias before fleeing, while the wounded Corazon is spotted by the villagers and also escapes.

Daniel and Corazon eventually meet in the forest. Corazon urges Daniel to leave her because of what she has become, but he declares that he still loves her and kisses her before she flees. Naldo confronts Daniel over his refusal to capture Corazon, but ultimately allows him to leave and reunite with her. As they disappear into the woods, Naldo narrates that Corazon, now regarded as an aswang, and Daniel are never seen again, though they are believed to remain nearby. He laments that the inhumanity of the times drove them to their tragic fate.

== Cast and characters ==
=== Main cast ===
- Erich Gonzales as Corazon
- Derek Ramsay as Daniel
- Tetchie Agbayani as Melinda
- Mark Gil as Matias
- Epy Quizon as Naldo

=== Supporting role ===
- Mon Confiado as Berto
- Maria Isabel Lopez as Herminia
- Sue Prado as Concha
- Dan Alvaro as Romulo
- Sharlene San Pedro as Nene
- Bodjie Pascua as Maning
- Hermie Concepcion as Maya
- Laiza Comia as Liza

== Overview ==
Early production began in May 2011. The director, Richard Somes revealed that the idea of the concept was created in 2008 after he finished his first horror full-length script, Yanggaw, a story that dwells on the aswang myth and the culture that surrounds the legend. The trailer simultaneously premiered in the premiere of the ABS-CBN Sunday night variety show, Sarah G. Live, in television and in the official YouTube account of Star Cinema online. The poster was also released the same time via Star Cinema's Twitter account.

== Release ==
The film was in direct competition with the GMA Films' My Kontrabida Girl which was also released on the same date.

== Reception ==
The film was graded "B" by the Cinema Evaluation Board. The film received R-13 rating from the MTRCB. On the review of Philippine Entertainment Portal; they praised the visuals, while the common complaint from the film is that the storytelling is a bit messy. PEP also pointed out there are too many side stories in the film, that they should have been focused on the title character.

The film is one of the 20 Top Grossing Filipino Films of 2012. It is the most successful independent film of 2012 when it comes to box office performance.

== See also ==
- List of ghost films
