= A Second Chance (2015 film) =

- Theatrical release poster
- Directed by: Cathy Garcia-Molina
- Written by: Carmi G. Raymundo; Vanessa R. Valdez; Cathy Garcia-Molina
- Produced by: Elma S. Medua
- Starring: John Lloyd Cruz; Bea Alonzo
- Cinematography: Noel Teehankee
- Edited by: Marya Ignacio
- Music by: Cesar Francis S. Concio
- Production company: Star Cinema
- Distributed by: ABS-CBN Film Productions
- Release date: November 25, 2015
- Running time: 130 minutes
- Country: Philippines
- Language: Filipino
- Box office: ₱43.3 million (opening day); ₱445.9 million (US$8.8 million) (Domestic); ₱556 million (US$11 million) (worldwide)

A Second Chance is a 2015 Filipino romantic drama film directed by Cathy Garcia-Molina and co-written by Carmi G. Raymundo and Vanessa R. Valdez. A sequel to Molina's 2007 film One More Chance, John Lloyd Cruz and Bea Alonzo reprised their respective roles as Popoy and Basha.

A Second Chance was a box office success, earning ₱43 million on its opening day. It also received generally favorable reviews from film critics and audiences. On its fourth week, the film earned more than ₱556 million worldwide, surpassing Starting Over Again to become the highest-grossing Filipino film of all time until the release of The Super Parental Guardians in 2016. The film was nominated for 14 FAMAS Awards, including Best Picture, Best Director (Garcia-Molina), Best Actor (Cruz), and Best Actress (Alonzo), but it did not win in any category.

== Synopsis ==
In the continuation of Popoy and Basha's love story from One More Chance, we find the couple walking down the aisle and vowing to love each other "forever" and "ever". A Second Chance explores the realities and intricacies of Popoy and Basha's married life. Popoy is a failed achiever, struggling to keep his business and self-esteem intact, while Basha has given up so much in her life to keep their marriage together.

== Cast ==
- John Lloyd Cruz as Engineer Rodolfo "Popoy" Gonzales Jr.
- Bea Alonzo as Architect Belinda "Basha" Eugenio-Gonzales
- Dimples Romana as Kristine "Krizzy" Del Rosario
- Janus Del Prado as Chinno Marquez
- James Blanco as Kenneth Del Rosario
- Ahron Villena as JP
- Bea Saw as Angeline "Anj" Tan
- Shamaine Buencamino as Rose
- Khalil Ramos as Noel
- Melissa Mendez as Elvie
- Denise Joaquin as Guia
- Jeffrey Tam as Jethro
- Billy Crawford as Pedro Gonzales
- Al Tantay as Tito Willie
- Arci Muñoz as Arah Cervantes
- Loren Burgos as Rai
- Sue Ramirez as Marie
- Arlene Tolibas as Tancing
- Dodie Ramilo as Barry
- Enrico Reyes as foreman
- Alexis Nacion as architect
- Robert Sanchez as contractor
- Karen Dematera as Jacq
- Jyrah Lopez as Chloe
- John Uy as architect
- Jed Montero as Chinno's wife
- Marc Santiago as Nathan
- Lucas Maggalang as Kynan
- Jerome Tan as architect
- Bodjie Pascua as old boss
- Cheryl Cosio as Mrs. Bernardo
- Chromewell "Chrome" Cosio as Mr. Bernardo

== Production ==
=== Music ===
A Second Chance is composed by Cesar Francis Concio, the son of ABS-CBN CEO Charo Santos-Concio.

== Release ==
A Second Chance was released in the Philippines on November 25, 2015. The film also premiered in major cities in Europe starting December 5, 2015.

=== Marketing ===
Star Cinema released a series of promotional materials at their personal account to promote the film. On August 17, 2015, the studio released a teaser of the film, which was followed by the first theatrical teaser on November 2, 2015 and a new and longer teaser on November 14, 2015.

=== International release ===
Star Cinema announced that the film will be released in Europe starting December 5, 2015. This is after ABS-CBN president and CEO Charo Santos-Concio announced during the recently held iEmmys in New York City that the Kapamilya network and its international arm, The Filipino Channel (TFC), will soon "raise the curtain for more Pinoy greats at Europe’s major theaters." A Second Chance will be screened in Vue Cinemas in the United Kingdom and via other major theaters in Milan, Rome, Messina, Padova, Paris, Madrid, and Vienna starting December 5 and 6. it was also shown in Singapore from December 12 to 13, 2015.

== Reception ==
=== Box office ===
The film was a box office success on its opening day, earning a total of ₱43.3 million from over 250 cinemas nationwide. Based upon the Philippine box office records, the film beat out the ₱32 million 2015 record of the romantic comedy film Crazy Beautiful You. As of November 27, 2015, the film has earned ₱100 million. On November 29, 2015, A Second Chance grossed ₱200 million. Major cinemas nationwide reported that they added more midnight screenings of the film "due to the deluge of audience in the evening."

As of November 30, 2015, the film has already grossed ₱300 million, 6 days since its initial release in the Philippines. After 10 days of its release, ABS CBN reported that the film has passed the ₱400 million mark. More than 4 weeks after its release, Star Cinema has announced that the film has already grossed more than ₱556,000,000.00 worldwide making it the first Filipino film to reach the ₱500 million mark.

=== Critical reception ===
The film received generally favorable reviews. Francis Joseph Cruz of Rappler.com writes, "Thankfully, A Second Chance gives honesty a chance within the business of weaving fables out of the romantic affairs of fictional people. In fact, it is almost a thorough middle-class drama, one that is as sensitive to the unwieldy aspirations of millennial couples as it is to the expectations of its paying audience. Its audacious mix of genre standards with an acute sense of belongingness in this real world of economic ambitions that are almost often betrayed is sincerely rewarding."

Philberty Dy of ClickTheCity rates the film 4 out of 5 stating, "They break through the barrier of artificiality, and deliver bits of emotion that cannot be ignored. And that’s really something, even given the flaws."

Atty. Ferdinand Topacio asserted in his review posted in Fashionpulis.com that, "A Second Chance is a cut above the rest, intelligent yet entertaining, and everything is above par: direction, editing and writing. The acting part is a given, with two of today's best in the field – John Lloyd Cruz and Bea Alonzo – playing the leads."

Irish Eden Belleza of Gulf News in Dubai criticized the film's focus on the two main casts who, according to her, dominated almost every scenes in the film, and wrote "The movie could have added a little more depth to the characters." However, she said that "for those in rocky relationships looking for reassurance that there is hope at the end of the tunnel and, well, a second chance, this is one feel-good movie they should watch."

== Accolades ==
Award	Date of ceremony	Category	Recipient(s)	Result
FAMAS Awards	December 4, 2016	Best Picture	A Second Chance	Nominated
FAMAS Awards	December 4, 2016	Best Director	Cathy Garcia-Molina	Nominated
FAMAS Awards	December 4, 2016	Best Actor	John Lloyd Cruz	Nominated
FAMAS Awards	December 4, 2016	Best Actress	Bea Alonzo	Nominated
FAMAS Awards	December 4, 2016	Best Supporting Actress	Bea Saw	Nominated
FAMAS Awards	December 4, 2016	Best Screenplay	Carmi G. Raymundo, Vanessa R. Valdez and Cathy Garcia-Molina	Nominated
FAMAS Awards	December 4, 2016	Best Story	Carmi G. Raymundo, Vanessa R. Valdez and Cathy Garcia-Molina	Nominated
FAMAS Awards	December 4, 2016	Best Cinematography	Noel Teehankee	Nominated
FAMAS Awards	December 4, 2016	Best Editing	Marya Ignacio	Nominated
FAMAS Awards	December 4, 2016	Best Musical Score	Cesar Francis S. Concio	Nominated
FAMAS Awards	December 4, 2016	Best Sound	Aurel Claro Bilbao and Co.	Nominated
FAMAS Awards	December 4, 2016	Best Theme Song	"I'll Never Go" by Erik Santos	Nominated
FAMAS Awards	December 4, 2016	Best Production Design	Gerry Borreros	Nominated
FAMAS Awards	December 4, 2016	Best Visual Effects	Aileen Girlie Mercado	Nominated
Gawad Urian Awards	June 22, 2016	Best Actor	John Lloyd Cruz	Nominated
Box Office Entertainment Awards	April 17, 2016	Phenomenal Stars of 2015	Bea Alonzo and John Lloyd Cruz	Won
Box Office Entertainment Awards	April 17, 2016	Most Popular Screenwriter	Carmi Raymundo and Vanessa Valdez	Won
Box Office Entertainment Awards	April 17, 2016	Most Popular Director	Cathy Garcia-Molina	Won
PMPC Star Awards for Movies	March 6, 2016	Movie of the Year	A Second Chance	Nominated
PMPC Star Awards for Movies	March 6, 2016	Movie Director of the Year	Cathy Garcia-Molina	Nominated
PMPC Star Awards for Movies	March 6, 2016	Movie Actress of the Year	Bea Alonzo	Won
PMPC Star Awards for Movies	March 6, 2016	Movie Screenwriter of the Year	Carmi G. Raymundo, Vanessa R. Valdez and Cathy Garcia-Molina	Nominated
PMPC Star Awards for Movies	March 6, 2016	Movie Cinematographer of the Year	Noel Teehankee	Nominated
PMPC Star Awards for Movies	March 6, 2016	Movie Production Designer of the Year	Gerry Borreros	Nominated
PMPC Star Awards for Movies	March 6, 2016	Movie Editor of the Year	Marya Ignacio	Nominated
PMPC Star Awards for Movies	March 6, 2016	Movie Musical Scorer of the Year	Cesar Francis S. Concio	Nominated
PMPC Star Awards for Movies	March 6, 2016	Movie Sound Engineer of the Year	Aurel Claro Bilbao	Nominated
