= List of highest-grossing films in the Philippines =

Films in the Philippines derive income mainly from theatrical exhibitions as revenues from home video, television broadcast rights and merchandising share a small portion of the studio earnings. Even more, unlike in the United States and other territories, gross receipts of movies in the country were not officially disclosed in detail through the years. Third-party organizations that focus on box-office statistics were not present in the industry until the website Box Office Mojo started providing comprehensive weekly performance of releases in 2007. Although the website is a reliable source, it does not summarize the highest grosses of all time for the reason that its scope is limited to the Metro Manila Film Festival, an annual event during December to January.

== Top 50 films ==
The table below shows the top 20 highest-grossing local and foreign films in the Philippines based from data gathered by Box Office Mojo. Gross earnings for foreign films represent their gross within the Philippines, while figures for local films represent their worldwide gross, as some did not disclose separate domestic and international gross. For consistency, all local films in this list are ranked based on their worldwide gross. The figures are not adjusted for inflation.

Color key

- – A local film

Note: Data is As of August 2026

| Rank | Title | Origin | Debut Gross (PHP) | Lifetime Gross (PHP) | Year |
|---|---|---|---|---|---|
| 1 | Avengers: Endgame | USA | ₱938,940,484 | ₱1,804,010,069 | 2019 |
| 2 | Hello, Love, Again | PH | ₱566,000,000 | ₱1,600,000,000 | 2024 |
| 3 | Spider-Man: Brand New Day | USA | ₱646,274,327 | ₱1,407,704,135 | 2026 |
| 4 | Avengers: Infinity War | USA | ₱587,000,000 | ₱1,208,177,641 | 2018 |
| 5 | Rewind | PH | ₱368,000,000 | ₱924,000,000 | 2023 |
| 6 | Hello, Love, Goodbye | PH | ₱319,429,863 | ₱880,600,000 | 2019 |
| 7 | Frozen II | USA | ₱314,635,331 | ₱837,059,545 | 2019 |
| 8 | Inside Out 2 | USA | ₱381,000,000 | ₱824,844,564 | 2024 |
| 9 | The Hows of Us | PH | ₱318,000,000 | ₱810,000,000 | 2018 |
| 10 | Beauty and the Beast | USA | ₱301,382,484 | ₱698,341,876 | 2017 |
| 11 | Captain America: Civil War | USA | ₱365,825,035 | ₱667,158,670 | 2016 |
| 12 | Captain Marvel | USA | ₱319,386,978 | ₱655,390,124 | 2019 |
| 13 | Avatar: The Way of Water | USA | ₱153,566,903 | ₱638,319,173 | 2022 |
| 14 | The Avengers | USA | ₱278,587,480 | ₱625,361,414 | 2012 |
| 15 | Avengers: Age of Ultron | USA | ₱336,563,664 | ₱620,615,965 | 2015 |
| 16 | Iron Man 3 | USA | ₱304,122,657 | ₱618,139,679 | 2013 |
| 17 | The Super Parental Guardians | PH | ₱240,560,299 | ₱598,000,000 | 2016 |
| 18 | Doctor Strange in the Multiverse of Madness | USA | ₱279,440,571 | ₱603,652,043 | 2022 |
| 19 | Aquaman | USA | ₱230,489,085 | ₱581,812,464 | 2018 |
| 20 | Aladdin | USA | ₱183,197,892 | ₱571,691,831 | 2019 |
| 21 | Gandarrapiddo: The Revenger Squad | PH | - | ₱571,000,000 | 2017 |
| 22 | Spider-Man: Far From Home | USA | ₱292,501,320 | ₱542,276,504 | 2019 |
| 23 | Wonder Woman | USA | ₱234,488,278 | ₱529,579,712 | 2017 |
| 24 | The Lion King | USA | ₱265,230,433 | ₱525,972,179 | 2019 |
| 25 | Beauty and the Bestie | PH | ₱156,256,677 | ₱524,239,150 | 2015 |
| 26 | Justice League | USA | ₱286,356,177 | ₱523,257,850 | 2017 |
| 27 | Fantastica | PH | - | ₱521,700,000 | 2018 |
| 28 | Jurassic World: Fallen Kingdom | USA | ₱214,204,780 | ₱520,038,496 | 2018 |
| 29 | Batman v Superman: Dawn of Justice | USA | ₱159,709,900 | ₱516,814,192 | 2016 |
| 30 | Black Panther | USA | ₱252,154,143 | ₱507,671,451 | 2018 |
| 31 | Jurassic World | USA | ₱246,380,729 | ₱501,432,544 | 2015 |
| 32 | Miracle in Cell No. 7 | PH | - | ₱486,190,000 | 2019 |
| 33 | A Second Chance | PH | ₱206,000,000 | ₱480,000,000 | 2015 |
| 34 | Maleficent: Mistress of Evil | USA | ₱176,713,452 | ₱474,096,034 | 2019 |
| 35 | And the Breadwinner Is... | PH | ₱172,000,000 | ₱460,000,000 | 2024 |
| 36 | The Amazing Praybeyt Benjamin | PH | ₱172,000,000 | ₱456,000,000 | 2014 |
| 37 | The Amazing Spider-Man 2 | USA | ₱251,044,553 | ₱453,434,993 | 2014 |
| 38 | Thor: Love and Thunder | USA | ₱213,017,109 | ₱453,302,741 | 2022 |
| 39 | Maid in Malacañang | PH | ₱138,000,000 | ₱442,100,000 | 2022 |
| 40 | Fast & Furious 7 | USA | ₱97,993,035 | ₱441,913,494 | 2015 |
| 41 | Star Wars: The Force Awakens | USA | ₱188,825,255 | ₱438,289,420 | 2015 |
| 42 | Transformers: Age of Extinction | USA | ₱250,314,948 | ₱434,744,749 | 2014 |
| 43 | Spider-Man 3 | USA | ₱135,027,316 | ₱434,648,741 | 2007 |
| 44 | Thor: Ragnarok | USA | ₱200,993,794 | ₱433,646,102 | 2017 |
| 45 | Girl, Boy, Bakla, Tomboy | PH | - | ₱421,000,000 | 2013 |
| 46 | X-Men: Apocalypse | USA | ₱228,106,196 | ₱416,019,273 | 2016 |
| 47 | Transformers: Dark of the Moon | USA | ₱211,373,145 | ₱413,430,499 | 2011 |
| 48 | Sisterakas | PH | ₱112,257,830 | ₱393,439,711 | 2012 |
| 49 | Black Panther: Wakanda Forever | USA | ₱172,046,426 | ₱392,813,027 | 2022 |
| 50 | Call Me Mother | PH | ₱152,700,000 | ₱392,000,000 | 2025 |

=== High-grossing films by year ===
High-grossing films by year of release
| Year | Local | | | Foreign | | | |
| Year | Title | Total gross (₱) | Ref | Title | Total gross (₱) | Country | Ref |
|---|---|---|---|---|---|---|---|
| 1951 | Roberta | | | Unknown | | | |
| 1955 | Ikaw Kasi | | | Unknown | | | |
| 1957 | Sino ang Maysala? | | | Unknown | | | |
| 1964 | Eddie Loves Susie | | | Unknown | | | |
| 1972 | Nardong Putik (Kilabot ng Cavite) | | | Unknown | | | |
| 1973 | Zoom, Zoom, Superman! | | | Unknown | | | |
| 1981 | Dear Heart | | | Unknown | | | |
| 1982 | Gaano Kadalas ang Minsan? | | | Unknown | | | |
| 1991 | Maging Sino Ka Man | | | Unknown | | | |
| 1994 | The Maggie dela Riva Story: God... Why Me? | | | True Lies | | United States | |
| 1998 | José Rizal | | | Titanic | 200.0 million | United States | |
| 1999 | Isusumbong Kita sa Tatay Ko... | | | Godzilla | 156.0 million | United States | |
| 2000 | Anak | 165.93 million | | Mission: Impossible 2 | 108.2 million | United States | |
| 2001 | Pangako... Ikaw Lang | | | Harry Potter and the Sorcerer's Stone | 151.0 million | United Kingdom; United States | |
| 2002 | Got 2 Believe | | | Spider-Man | 161.5 million | United States | |
| 2003 | Ang Tanging Ina | 178.8 million | | X2: X-Men United | 120.4 million | United States | |
| 2004 | Milan | 135.8 million | | Spider-Man 2 | 226.5 million | United States | |
| 2005 | Enteng Kabisote 2: Okay Ka, Fairy Ko... The Legend Continues! | 158.0 million | | Harry Potter and the Goblet of Fire | 199.51 million | United Kingdom; United States | |
| 2006 | Sukob | 203.0 million | | Superman Returns | 224.7 million | United States | |
| 2007 | One More Chance | 152.7 million | | Spider-Man 3 | 434.9 million | United States | |
| 2008 | Ang Tanging Ina N'yong Lahat | 197.0 million | | Iron Man | 168.6 million | United States | |
| 2009 | You Changed My Life | 232.2 million | | Transformers: Revenge of the Fallen | 355.2 million | United States | |
| 2010 | Ang Tanging Ina Mo: Last Na 'To! | 210.0 million | | The Twilight Saga: Eclipse | 292.8 million | United States | |
| 2011 | The Unkabogable Praybeyt Benjamin | 332.0 million | | Transformers: Dark of the Moon | 424.6 million | United States | |
| 2012 | Sisterakas | 393.4 million | | The Avengers | 613.7 million | United States | |
| 2013 | Girl, Boy, Bakla, Tomboy | 421.0 million | | Iron Man 3 | 617.4 million | United States | |
| 2014 | Starting Over Again | 579.0 million | | The Amazing Spider-Man 2 | 447.0 million | United States | |
| 2015 | A Second Chance | 556.0 million | | Avengers: Age of Ultron | 623.2 million | United States | |
| 2016 | The Super Parental Guardians | 598.0 million | | Captain America: Civil War | 666.4 million | United States | |
| 2017 | Gandarrapiddo! The Revenger Squad | 571.0 million | | Beauty and the Beast | 675.5 million | United States | |
| 2018 | The Hows of Us | 810.0 million | | Avengers: Infinity War | 1,217.4 million | United States | |
| 2019 | Hello, Love, Goodbye | 880.6 million | | Avengers: Endgame | 1,711.4 million | United States | |
| 2020 | On Vodka, Beers, and Regrets | 80.0 million | | Star Wars: The Rise of Skywalker | 183.6 million | United States | |
| 2021 | Unknown | | | Eternals | 63.6 million | United States | |
| 2022 | Deleter | 270.0 million | | Avatar: The Way of Water | 642.9 million | United States | |
| 2023 | Rewind | 924.0 million | | The Little Mermaid | 334.2 million | United States | |
| 2023 | Rewind | 924.0 million | | Barbie | 300–350 million | United States | |
| 2024 | Hello, Love, Again | 1,600.0 million | | Inside Out 2 | 824.8 million | United States | |
| 2025 | Call Me Mother | 392.0 million | | The Conjuring: Last Rites | 436.0 million | United States | |
| 2025 | Call Me Mother | 392.0 million | | Demon Slayer: Infinity Castle | | Japan | |

== Local films ==
The table below shows the top 10 highest-grossing Filipino films in the Philippines based on their worldwide gross, which includes both domestic (Philippines) and international box office earnings. For some local films, official figures for domestic and international earnings have not been disclosed. The figures are derived from data provided by Box Office Mojo and other reliable sources. The figures are not adjusted for inflation.

| Rank | Title | Year | Domestic gross | International gross | Worldwide gross | Worldwide gross (inflation adjusted for year 2024) | Ref(s) |
|---|---|---|---|---|---|---|---|
| 1 | Hello, Love, Again | 2024 | ₱1,000,000,000 | ₱600,000,000 | ₱1,600,000,000 | ₱1,600,000,000 | |
| 2 | Rewind | 2023 | ₱848,000,000 | ₱76,000,000 | ₱924,000,000 | ₱979,440,000 | |
| 3 | Hello, Love, Goodbye | 2019 | ₱691,000,000 | ₱189,603,490 | ₱880,603,490 | ₱1,076,242,252 | |
| 4 | The Hows of Us | 2018 | ₱690,000,000 | ₱120,000,000 | ₱810,000,000 | ₱1,042,519,692 | |
| 5 | The Super Parental Guardians | 2016 | - | - | ₱598,000,000 | ₱801,493,049 | |
| 6 | Fantastica | 2018 | - | - | ₱596,000,000 | ₱767,088,564 | |
| 7 | Starting Over Again | 2014 | - | - | ₱579,000,000 | ₱809,351,105 | |
| 8 | Gandarrapiddo! The Revenger Squad | 2017 | - | - | ₱571,000,000 | ₱755,857,023 | |
| 9 | A Second Chance | 2015 | - | - | ₱556,000,000 | ₱750,193,741 | |
| 10 | Miracle in Cell No. 7 | 2019 | - | - | ₱543,000,000 | ₱663,635,279 | |

Note: All figures are in Philippine peso.

The tables below are records and milestones for Filipino films.

Opening and Day records
| Record | Title | Gross | Date | Ref(s) |
|---|---|---|---|---|
| Highest opening day | Hello, Love, Again | 85 million | Nov 13, 2024 | |
| Highest single day | Hello, Love, Again | 131 million | Nov 16, 2024 | |
| Opening weekend | Hello, Love, Again | 566 million (Note: No official opening weekend figure was released in the mainstream media. The closest estimate, based on the end-of-weekend gross, is the figure released on Monday, reporting a ₱566 million six-day gross. Nonetheless, the film undoubtedly broke the opening weekend record.) | Nov 13-18, 2024 | |

Highest opening day records
| Rank | Title | Gross | Date | Ref(s) |
|---|---|---|---|---|
| 1 | Hello, Love, Again | 85 million | November 13, 2024 | |
| 2 | The Super Parental Guardians | 75 million | December 25, 2016 | |
| 3 | My Bebe Love: KiligPaMore | 60.5 million | December 25, 2015 | |
| 4 | The Amazing Praybeyt Benjamin | 53 million | December 25, 2014 | |
| 5 | My Little Bossings | 50.5 million | December 25, 2013 | |
| 6 | Felix Manalo | 50 million | October 4, 2015 | |
| 6 | Rewind | 50 million | December 25, 2023 | |
| 7 | Call Me Mother | 49 million | December 25, 2025 | |
| 8 | Girl, Boy, Bakla, Tomboy | 47.6 million | December 25, 2013 | |
| 9 | A Second Chance | 43.3 million | November 25, 2015 | |
| 10 | Sisterakas | 40 million | December 25, 2012 | |

Fastest films to reach milestones
| Milestone (₱) | Title | Date | Days to milestone | Gross on day of milestone | Ref(s) |
|---|---|---|---|---|---|
| 100M | Hello, Love, Again | November 14, 2024 | 2 | 155 million | |
| 200M | Hello, Love, Again | November 15, 2024 | 3 | 245 million | |
| 300M | Hello, Love, Again | November 18, 2024 | 6 | 566 million | |
| 400M | Hello, Love, Again | November 18, 2024 | 6 | 566 million | |
| 500M | Hello, Love, Again | November 18, 2024 | 6 | 566 million | |
| 600M | Hello, Love, Again | November 22, 2024 | 10 | 930 million | |
| 700M | Hello, Love, Again | November 22, 2024 | 10 | 930 million | |
| 800M | Hello, Love, Again | November 22, 2024 | 10 | 930 million | |
| 900M | Hello, Love, Again | November 22, 2024 | 10 | 930 million | |
| 1B | Hello, Love, Again | November 23, 2024 | 11 | 1.06 billion | |
| 1.1B | Hello, Love, Again | November 27, 2024 | 15 | 1.10 billion | |
| 1.2B | Hello, Love, Again | November 27, 2024 | 15 | 1.28 billion | |
| 1.3B | Hello, Love, Again | November 29, 2024 | 17 | 1.30 billion | |
| 1.4B | Hello, Love, Again | December 1, 2024 | 19 | 1.40 billion | |
| 1.6B | Hello, Love, Again | February 25, 2025 | 104 | 1.60 billion | |

== Foreign films ==
The table below shows the top 10 highest-grossing foreign films in the Philippines based on data from Box Office Mojo. The figures are not adjusted for inflation and are provided in USD, as reported by Box Office Mojo. Converted to PHP based on the exchange rate at the time of each film's release in the Philippines.

| Rank | Title | Year | Gross (in PHP) | Gross (in USD) | Reference(s) |
|---|---|---|---|---|---|
| 1 | Avengers: Endgame | 2019 | ₱1,711,415,002 | $32,839,486 | |
| 2 | Avengers: Infinity War | 2018 | ₱1,217,441,050 | $23,295,180 | |
| 3 | Spider-Man: Brand New Day | 2026 | ₱1,055,450,905 | $17,186,955 | |
| 4 | Frozen II | 2019 | ₱837,059,545 | $16,417,761 | |
| 5 | Inside Out 2 | 2024 | ₱824,844,564 | $14,111,246 | |
| 6 | Beauty and the Beast | 2017 | ₱675,548,099 | $13,501,376 | |
| 7 | Captain America: Civil War | 2016 | ₱666,439,046 | $14,195,000 | |
| 8 | Captain Marvel | 2019 | ₱652,008,052 | $12,492,800 | |
| 9 | Avatar: The Way of Water | 2022 | ₱642,906,758 | $11,555,693 | |
| 10 | Doctor Strange in the Multiverse of Madness | 2022 | ₱636,326,542 | $12,121,660 | |

== Box-office number-one films by year ==
The following are the highest-grossing box-office films (local and foreign films combined) per year:

- 2008
- 2009
- 2010
- 2011
- 2012
- 2013
- 2014
- 2015

== Highest-grossing Filipino films by year ==
The following are the highest-grossing Filipino films per year:

- 2011
- 2012
- 2013
- 2014
- 2015
- 2016
- 2017
- 2018
- 2019
- 2020
- 2021
- 2022
- 2023
- 2024
- 2025

== See also ==
- List of highest-grossing Philippine films
