= The Hows of Us =

2018 romantic comedy-drama film by Cathy Garcia-Molina

- Theatrical release poster
- Directed by: Cathy Garcia-Molina
- Screenplay by: Carmi G. Raymundo; Crystal S. San Miguel; Gillian Ebreo; Cathy Garcia-Molina
- Story by: Cathy Garcia-Molina
- Produced by: Carlo L. Katigbak; Olivia M. Lamasan
- Starring: Kathryn Bernardo; Daniel Padilla
- Cinematography: Noel Teehankee
- Edited by: Marya Ignacio; Rosabelle Bandong
- Music by: Jessie Q. Lasaten
- Production company: Star Cinema
- Distributed by: ABS-CBN Film Productions
- Release date: August 29, 2018
- Running time: 120 minutes
- Country: Philippines
- Languages: Filipino; English
- Box office: ₱810 million (US$15.5 million)

The Hows of Us is a 2018 Filipino romantic comedy-drama film directed by Cathy Garcia-Molina and co-written by Crystal S. San Miguel, Gillian Ebreo, and Carmi G. Raymundo. The film stars Kathryn Bernardo and Daniel Padilla, in their second collaboration with Garcia-Molina, following She's Dating the Gangster in 2014.

Produced and distributed by ABS-CBN Film Productions, the film was theatrically released in the Philippines on August 29, 2018, and broke multiple records in the Philippines, including being one of the first locally produced movies to reach ₱600 million in domestic box-office earnings, which it achieved in 20 days. The film grossed ₱805 million under 50 days after its Philippine release.

== Plot ==
Primo and Georgina are young lovers who inherit a house from Georgina’s guardian, Tita Lola. Before her death, Tita Lola asks them to care for each other and the property. After she dies, they move in together and begin refurbishing the home while sharing plans for their future. Primo pursues a career as an Original Pilipino Music (OPM) musician, while Georgina studies medicine with hopes of becoming a doctor. Georgina admires Primo’s passion and commitment to his dreams, but over time, his repeated shortcomings strain their relationship.

As their love deepens, the couple must confront the challenges of maintaining a long-term relationship and the harsh realities of life. Their conflicts eventually led to separation. Years later, they decide to sell the house. While clearing out their belongings, Georgina discovers a birthday gift from Primo that she had discarded after their breakup. Inside is a vinyl record and a heartfelt letter in which Primo apologizes for his failures and acknowledges Georgina’s sacrifices and hard work. Moved by the gesture, Georgina reconciles with Primo, and the film concludes with the two reunited and sharing a kiss.

== Cast ==
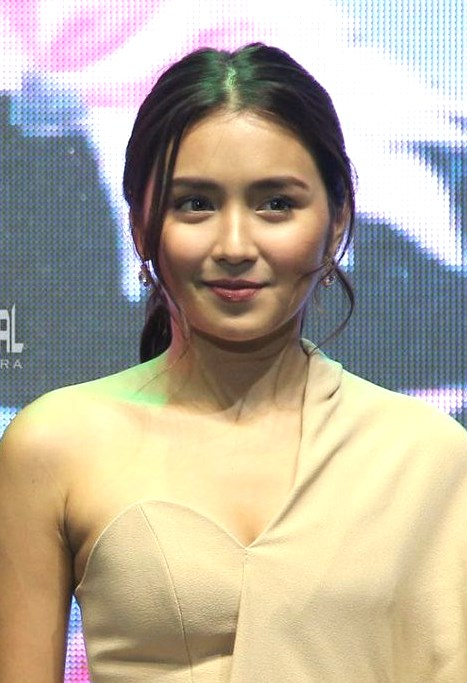
Kathryn Bernardo portrays Georgina "George" Reyes.

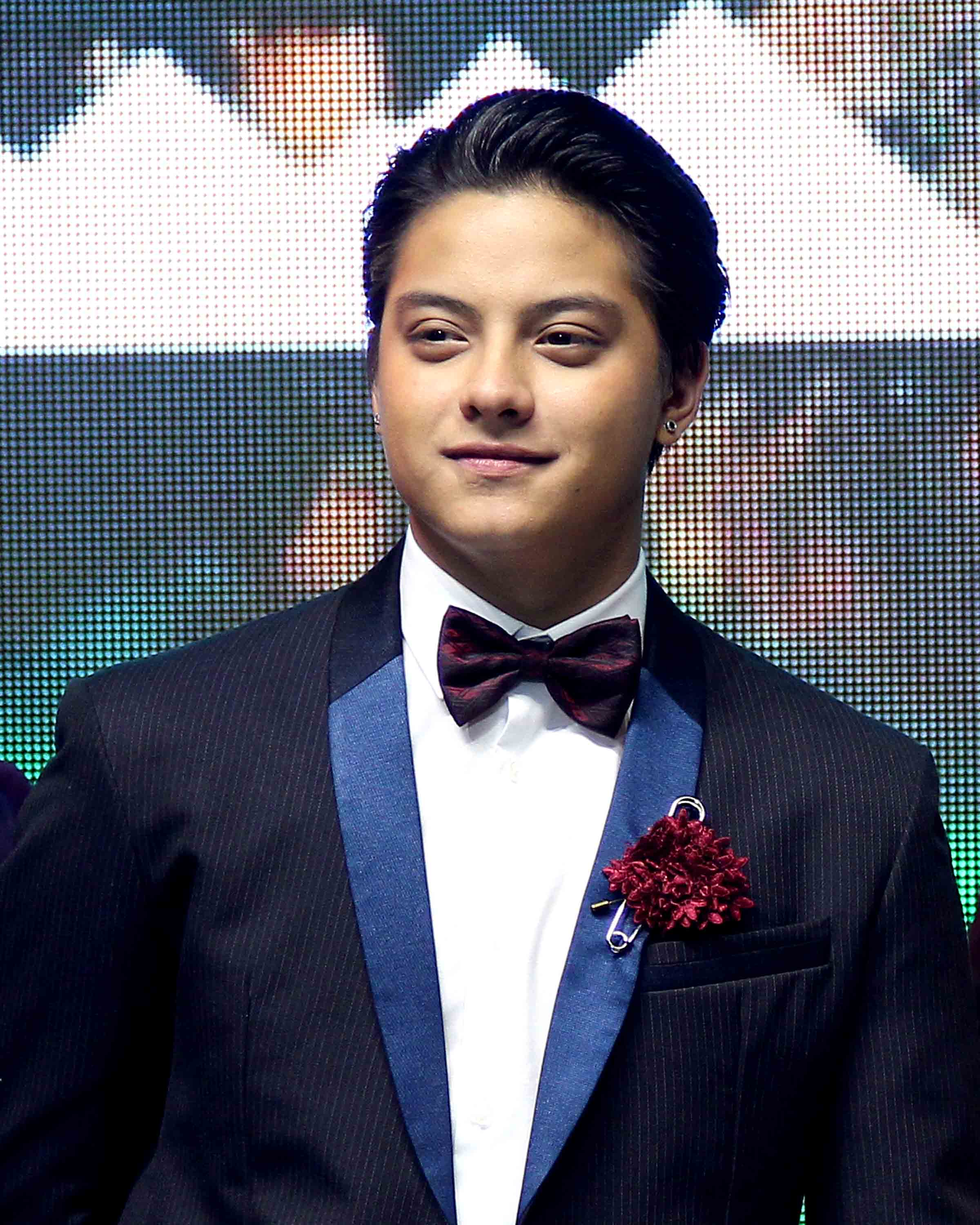
Daniel Padilla portrays Primo Alvarez.

- Kathryn Bernardo as Georgina "George" Reyes, a graduating Medical student with Dutch descent on her biological father's side, Primo's love interest.
- Daniel Padilla as Primo Alvarez, an aspiring musician who dreams of performing on stage all over the world, George's love interest.
- Darren Espanto as Yohan Reyes, George's younger brother
- Jean Garcia as Mama Baby Reyes, George's mother
- Susan Africa as Helen "Tita Lola" Antonio / Lola Leonida Antonio, George's Grandaunt
- Alwyn Uytingco as Bowie, Primo's Friend and a member of his rock band
- Ria Atayde as Awee, George's bestfriend
- Juan Miguel Severo as Mikko, George's bestfriend
- Odette Khan as Mrs. Abellera, House Buyer
- Kit Thompson as Darwin, Primo's cousin
- Ana de Leon as Anna (fictional version of herself), Bowie's wife

== Release ==
The Hows of Us premiered in cinemas in the Philippines on August 29, 2018. On September 6, 2018, eight days after the domestic release of The Hows of Us, the film started its international screenings in Brunei, Papua New Guinea, and the United Arab Emirates. On the following day, the film premiered in Canada, Malaysia, and the United States. The film also began screening in Saipan in the Northern Mariana Islands. On September 8 and 9, screenings started in Thailand, the United Kingdom, Italy, and Spain.

The Hows of Us, started showing in regular cinemas in Vietnam on October 26, 2018. It also had a regular screening in Indonesia in November 2018.

== Reception ==
=== Box office ===
==== Domestic ====
The Hows of Us earned ₱35.9 million on its first day. Five days after, it earned ₱279.5 million, making it the biggest opening weekend of a Filipino film of all time. The film also broke many records in a span of 5 days, such as the highest single-day gross for a local film; a staggering ₱82.4 million alone on September 2, 2018, and the highest number of cinemas opened for any local film with 435 on September 2, 2018.

As of September 3, 2018, the film gross total earned ₱318 million As of September 7, 2018, the film has grossed ₱404.7 million in just 10 days, breaking the record of A Second Chance which grossed ₱400 million on its 11th day, making it the fastest local non-MMFF film to breach the ₱400M mark. As of September 9, 2018, the movie has grossed a total of ₱505.7 million domestically in just 12 days, making it the fastest local film to breach the ₱500 million mark. After 20 days in still 200 cinemas nationwide, the film has grossed ₱601.2 domestically, beating Gandarrapiddo: The Revenger Squad's ₱571 million It is the first Philippine film to breach the ₱600 million mark domestically.

On September 26, 2018, the film's box office gross has reached around ₱650 million.

==== International ====
It was announced by Star Cinema's executive, Roxy Liquigan, at their Victory Party (September 12) that the movie has grossed $1 million in 5 days (September 6–10) of international screenings.

In North America, The Hows of Us earned $537,000 on its first 3 days. After 10 days, the movie earned a whopping $1.2 million. Movie City News reported that the movie has grossed $1.5M in 17 days of screening in North America. In United Kingdom, the movie earned a record-breaking $30,890 in its first 3 days screening in 3 theaters only. While in Australia, the movie posted a potent $64,340 gross on its first 3 days of screening. Box Office Mojo in UAE reported that the movie earned a record-breaking $369,918 4-day opening gross.

After 2 weeks of showing abroad, The Hows of Us breach the two-million-US-dollar mark ($2.043 million) announced by TFC on Twitter. It is the second film starring Bernardo and Padilla to breach the two-million-US-dollar mark abroad, the first one being their 2015 hit Crazy Beautiful You.

On September 26, 2018, the figure rose to $2.3 million.

The Hows of Us has already made $2.675 million (₱144 million), from overseas screenings.

=== Accolades ===
| Award-giving organization | Date | Category | Recipient(s) | Result | Ref. |
|---|---|---|---|---|---|
| 50th Guillermo Mendoza Box Office Awards | March 24, 2019 | Golden Jury Award for Highest-Grossing Film of All Time | The Hows of Us | Honored | |
| 50th Guillermo Mendoza Box Office Awards | March 24, 2019 | Phenomenal Stars of Philippine Cinema | Daniel Padilla and Kathryn Bernardo | Honored | |
| 50th Guillermo Mendoza Box Office Awards | March 24, 2019 | Most Popular Screenwriters | Carmi Raymundo, Crystal San Miguel, Gillian Ebreo, and Cathy Garcia Molina | Won | |
| 50th Guillermo Mendoza Box Office Awards | March 24, 2019 | Most Popular Film Director | Cathy Garcia-Molina | Won | |
| 35th PMPC Star Awards for Movies | June 2, 2019 | Movie of the Year | The Hows of Us | Nominated | |
| 35th PMPC Star Awards for Movies | June 2, 2019 | Movie Director of the Year | Cathy Garcia-Molina | Nominated | |
| 35th PMPC Star Awards for Movies | June 2, 2019 | Movie Actor of the Year | Daniel Padilla | Nominated | |
| 35th PMPC Star Awards for Movies | June 2, 2019 | Movie Actress of the Year | Kathryn Bernardo | Won (Note: Tied with Sarah Geronimo.) | |
| 35th PMPC Star Awards for Movies | June 2, 2019 | Movie Supporting Actress | Ria Atayde | Nominated | |
| 35th PMPC Star Awards for Movies | June 2, 2019 | Movie Supporting Actress | Jean Garcia | Nominated | |
| 35th PMPC Star Awards for Movies | June 2, 2019 | New Movie Actor of the Year | Darren Espanto | Nominated | |
| 35th PMPC Star Awards for Movies | June 2, 2019 | Original Screenplay of the Year (Movie) | The Hows of Us | Nominated | |
| 35th PMPC Star Awards for Movies | June 2, 2019 | Cinematographer of the Year (Movie) | Noel Teehankee | Nominated | |
| 35th PMPC Star Awards for Movies | June 2, 2019 | Production Designer of the Year (Movie) | Norico Santos | Nominated | |
| 35th PMPC Star Awards for Movies | June 2, 2019 | Editor of the Year (Movie) | Marya Ignacio and Noemi Paguiligan | Nominated | |
| 35th PMPC Star Awards for Movies | June 2, 2019 | Musical Scorer of the Year (Movie) | Jessie Q. Lasaten | Nominated | |
| 35th PMPC Star Awards for Movies | June 2, 2019 | Sound Engineer of the Year (Movie) | Allen Roy Santos | Nominated | |
| 35th PMPC Star Awards for Movies | June 2, 2019 | Movie Loveteam of the Year | Kathryn Bernardo and Daniel Padilla | Won | |
| 37th Luna Awards | November 30, 2019 | Best Actor | Daniel Padilla | Won | |
| 37th Luna Awards | November 30, 2019 | Best Editing | Marya Ignacio and Noemi Paguiligan | Nominated | |
| 37th Luna Awards | November 30, 2019 | Best Screenplay | The Hows of Us; Screenplay by Carmi Raymundo, Gillian Ebreo, Crystal San Miguel, and Cathy Garcia-Molina | Nominated | |

Film Development Council of the Philippines (FDCP)

- Camera Obscura Award - FDCP Film Ambassadors 2019 as the Highest Grossing Filipino Film in a Regular Screening

5th Inding-Indie Short Film Festival

- Best Actress – Kathryn Bernardo
- Best Actor – Daniel Padilla

RAWR Awards 2018

- Actress of the Year – Kathryn Bernardo
- Supporting Actor of the Year – Darren Espanto
- Movie ng Taon – The Hows Of Us

Gawad Pasado 2019 ng Pampelikulang Samahan ng mga Dalubguro

- PinakaPASADOng Pelikula – The Hows Of Us (Nominated)
- PinakaPASADOng Aktor – Daniel Padilla (Nominated)
- PinakaPASADOng Aktres – Kathryn Bernardo (Nominated)

Entertainment Editors' Choice Awards for Movies (EDDY'S) 2019

- Best Actress - Kathryn Bernardo
