= List of highest-grossing Filipino films in 2013 =

The following are Filipino films that at least earned 50 million pesos in 2013 during their respective screenings.

Rank	Film	Production outfit	Film released	Domestic gross^{1}	Source
1.	Girl, Boy, Bakla, Tomboy	Star Cinema, Viva Films	December 25	₱ 429,147,428	
2.	It Takes a Man and a Woman	Star Cinema, Viva Films	March 30	₱ 405,612,058	
3.	My Little Bossings	Octo Arts Films, M-Zet	December 25	₱ 401,740,000 (est.)	
4.	Pagpag: Siyam na Buhay	Star Cinema, Regal Films	December 25	₱ 240,100,000 (est.)	
5.	Four Sisters and a Wedding	Star Cinema	June 26	₱ 145,029,261	
6.	She's the One	Star Cinema	October 16	₱ 138,564,167	
7.	Bakit Hindi Ka Crush Ng Crush Mo?	Star Cinema	July 31	₱ 102,368,727	
8.	Must Be... Love	Star Cinema	March 13	₱ 80,740,463	
9.	Bromance: My Brother's Romance	Skylight Films	May 15	₱ 73,848,739	
10.	Kung Fu Divas	Star Cinema, Reality Entertainment	October 2	₱ 65,843,591	
11.	A Moment In Time	Star Cinema	February 13	₱ 64,543,391	
12.	Momzillas	Star Cinema, Viva Films	September 18	₱ 55,266,151	

Note

1. Box Office Mojo, a reliable third party box office revenue tracker, does not track any revenues earned during any Metro Manila Film Festival editions. So the official figures by film entries during the festival are only estimates taken from any recent updates from credible and reliable sources such as a film's production outfit, or from any news agencies. Also, Metropolitan Manila Development Authority (MMDA) did not release the official gross sales of each of the films. To verify the figures, see individual sources for the references.

Color key

– a Metro Manila Film Festival entry film
