= Skylight Films =

Defunct Philippine film studio

- Company type: Division
- Industry: Independent films Specialty films
- Founded: January 2011
- Defunct: 2018
- Successor: Black Sheep
- Headquarters: Quezon City, Philippines
- Area served: Philippines
- Key people: Enrico Santos; Malou Santos
- Products: Motion pictures
- Owner: ABS-CBN Corporation
- Parent: ABS-CBN Films

Skylight Films was a division of ABS-CBN Films that specialized in producing films for the niche market. Its first feature film was the 2012 comedy romance My Cactus Heart, which was followed by other films (see Filmography) until 2017.

With the consolidation of the operations of ABS-CBN's film arm (ABS-CBN Films) and the creation of Black Sheep Productions in 2018, Skylight Films ceased operations.

== Filmography ==
Year	Title	Production	Distribution
2012	My Cactus Heart	Skylight Films	Star Cinema
2012	Corazon: Ang Unang Aswang	Skylight Films; Reality Entertainment; Strawdogs Studio	Star Cinema
2012	Amorosa: The Revenge	Skylight Films	Star Cinema
2013	Bromance: My Brother's Romance	Skylight Films	Star Cinema
2013	Tuhog	Skylight Films	Star Cinema
2013	Call Center Girl	Skylight Films	Star Cinema
2014	My Illegal Wife	Skylight Films	Star Cinema
2014	Once a Princess	Skylight Films; Regal Entertainment, Inc.	Star Cinema
2014	Talk Back and You're Dead	Viva Films; Skylight Films; ABS-CBN Film Productions, Inc.	Star Cinema; Viva Films
2014	Beauty in a Bottle	Quantum Films; Skylight Films; ABS-CBN Film Productions, Inc.	Star Cinema
2015	Ex with Benefits	ABS-CBN Film Productions, Inc. Viva Films; Skylight Films	Star Cinema
2017	Extra Service	ABS-CBN Film Productions, Inc. Skylight Films	Star Cinema
