= ClickTheCity.com =

Filipino entertainment website

ClickTheCity.com logo

ClickTheCity is an entertainment and lifestyle guide website in the Philippines. It provides a companion mobile application.

ClickTheCity started in 2000 as an online directory of restaurants, shops, TV and movie schedules in Metro Manila. In 2009, ClickTheCity launched a mobile application for iOS and Android. In November 2011, ClickTheCity began a mobile ordering function, allowing users to order from McDonald's, Shakey's, and other Quick Delivery's partner restaurants.

== Awards and Recognitions ==
- 3rd Philippine Web Awards (2000) – Best Website – Travel
- 5th Philippine Web Awards (2002) – Best Website – Services
- 6th Philippine Web Awards (2003) – Best Website – E-services
- 7th Philippine Web Awards (2004) – Best Website – E-services
- 8th Philippine Web Awards (2005) – Inducted into the Philippine Web Awards Hall of Fame
- Digital Filipino Web Awards (2008) – Winner, Guides/Review Category
- Digital Filipino Web Awards (2014) – Winner, Guide Category
