= D' Lucky Ones! =

- Theatrical Release Poster
- Directed by: Wenn V. Deramas
- Screenplay by: Rose Colindres; Theodore Boborol
- Story by: Rose Colindres
- Produced by: Charo Santos-Concio; Malou N. Santos
- Starring: Pokwang; Eugene Domingo; Sandara Park; Joseph Bitangcol
- Cinematography: Sherman Philip T. So
- Edited by: Renewin Alano
- Music by: Jessie Lasaten
- Distributed by: Star Cinema
- Release date: April 15, 2006
- Running time: 106 minutes
- Country: Philippines
- Language: Filipino

D' Lucky Ones! is a 2006 Filipino romantic comedy film directed by Wenn Deramas. It stars Sandara Park, Joseph Bitangcol, Eugene Domingo and Pokwang.

This is the only film to feature Sandara Park without Hero Angeles since 2004's Bcuz of U and 2005's Can This Be Love when he controversially ended his contract with Star Magic because she is now paired with Joseph Bitangcol until they both joined the cast of Crazy for You on September 11, five months later along with Michelle Madrigal and Roxanne Guinoo as her SCQ co-teen questors.

== Synopsis ==
Tina (Domingo) and Lea (Pokwang) have been best friends since they met in a concert of their idolized actress Vilma Santos. Suddenly, Lea decides to go to South Korea to find a better job. Years later, Tina gives birth to a boy while Lea gives birth to a girl. They name the two Lucky Boy and Lucky Girl to commemorate Vilma's son Luis "Lucky" Manzano. They then vowed to each other that their children will marry in the appropriate time. However, as Lucky Boy and Lucky Girl grow up, the children have started hating their mothers for ruining their childhoods after Tina and Lea arranged their parties with themes of Vilma Santos' films.

Years have passed and Lea, with Lucky Girl (Park), goes back to the Philippines to live with her best friend. At the airport, Tina, with Lucky Boy (Bitangcol), gets ready for her best friend's arrival by arranging a welcome home party. Lucky Girl and Lucky Boy, on the other hand, are not very excited to see each other. Lucky Girl leaves while her mother is watching a film, while Lucky Boy departs to go to his apartment. Meanwhile, Lea notices that she is the only passenger left on the plane and that Lucky Girl is missing. At a telephone booth, Lucky Girl and Lucky Boy meet each other, not knowing who the opposite is. Lucky Girl spots Lucky Boy wearing a pink SpongeBob SquarePants towel, which was one of her ideals for her soulmate. Lucky Girl continues to fall in love with Lucky Boy as they meet in spontaneous circumstances. In the meantime, Tina and Lea have gone crazy after looking everywhere for Lucky Girl.

At his apartment, Lucky Boy lets Lucky Girl to stay at his house for the meantime; only to disagree after learning that her name is Lucky Girl. A flashback shows Lucky Girl (Pineda) almost falling into a well after being hit by Lucky Boy (Manalo). Lucky Boy says sorry, only to be kicked by Lucky Girl in his newly circumcised penis. At first, Lucky Boy refuses for Lucky Girl to stay, only to accept after Lucky Girl says she will do anything. This starts Lucky Boy taking the chance for revenge onto Lucky Girl.

The next day, Tina and Lea investigate Lucky Boy's house. Lucky Boy's friend Thea (Valdez) protects Lucky Boy and Lucky Girl's appearance to their mothers. Lucky Boy, on the other hand, tours Lucky Girl to her new apartment which is beside his apartment. Convinced, Tina and Lea return home to Tina's house. The next day, Lucky Girl is helped by Lucky Boy and his other friends Macoy (Del Prado) and Yammy (Humphries) in decorating her apartment. At ABS-CBN, Lea and Tina interrupts a line after trying to sneak in front, causing a commotion. One of the persons involved in the trouble, Ralph (Valentin), is comforted by the two. The two starts to fall in love with him, only until Cara (Pangilinan) interrupts announcing that Vilma Santos is in the building. The three search for the actress, only to find look-alikes of the actress.

While Lucky Boy, Macoy, and Jose (Fajardo) pulls a prank onto Lucky Girl, Lucky Girl mistakes Jose as Lucky Boy. That night, Lucky Girl tries to leave her apartment, only to be convinced by Lucky Boy to stay. She decides to call her mother, in which she said that they will meet at a bar tomorrow night. At the bar, Lea, Tina, and Ralph wait for Lucky Girl and Lucky Boy. The host announces a dance contest, wherein Lea and Tina decides to join it to impress Ralph. The duo's dance continues until they were only half-dressed, which was seen by their children. Lucky Girl, ashamed of her mother and learning that Lucky Boy was coming, decides to leave the bar.

The next day, Lucky Boy asks Lucky Girl if she want to come at an amusement park. Lucky Girl reluctantly agrees. There, Lucky Boy starts to hallucinate, a sign that he was falling in love with Lucky Girl. That night, at her apartment, Lucky Girl finds Jose snooping into her stuff. She performs taekwondo on him, until Jose admits who is the real Lucky Boy. Upon learning this, Lucky Girl plots revenge to Lucky Boy. One night, Lucky Boy asks Lucky Girl for a date. Lucky Girl gets mad at him for not admitting the truth. At the restaurant, Lea and Tina, with Ralph, sees their children fighting. They broke up the fight, only to end up fighting themselves.

Weeks have passed and Lea and Tina still hate each other. While getting angry to her mother for idolizing Vilma Santos, Lucky Girl learns that her mother was abused by her father, and that attending Vilma's concerts is the only thing that made Lea happy. Lucky Girl, with Lucky Boy, Cara, Ralph, Yammy, Thea, Macoy, and Jose, plans to fix Lea and Tina's friendship by throwing a party for the two. Although this was unsuccessful, Cara explains to Lucky Boy and Lucky Girl that there is only one person who can fix the fight, that even Lea and Tina would not disagree.

At Vilma's reunion concert, Lea (with Lucky Girl, Thea, and Jose) and Tina (with Lucky Boy, Tammy, and Macoy) sees their idol onstage. Vilma calls Lea and Tina, who she says are the real "lucky ones", and tries to fix their friendship. Lea and Tina reprises their friendship, while Lucky Boy and Lucky Girl kisses each other. The film ends with the cast dancing to Park's "Ang Ganda Ko" ("I'm Beautiful").

== Cast and characters ==
=== Main cast ===
- Sandara Park as Lucky Girl / Anna
- Joseph Bitangcol as Lucky Boy / Luis

=== Supporting cast ===
- Eugene Domingo as Tina
- Pokwang as Lea
- Candy Pangilinan as Cara
- Nikki Valdez as Thea
- JR Valentin as Ralph
- Janus Del Prado as Macoy
- Carla Humphries as Yammy
- Franzen Fajardo as Jose

=== Guest cast ===
- John Manalo as Young Lucky Boy (10 years old)
- Jairus Aquino as Young Lucky Boy (6 years old)
- Eliza Pineda as Young Lucky Girl (10 years old)
- KC Aboloc as Young Lucky Girl (6 years old)
- Rafael Rosell as Eduardo "Edu/Doods"
- Chokoleit as Bar host

=== Cameo appearance ===
- Vilma Santos as herself
