= Star Circle Quest season 1 =

Star Circle Quest
- Season 1
- Starring: Hosts: Luis Manzano; Jodi Sta. Maria; Jury: Boy Abunda; Gloria Diaz; Laurenti Dyogi

Release
- Original network: ABS-CBN
- Original release: March 1 – June 5, 2004

Season chronology
- Next → Season 2

Star Circle Quest (season 1) premiered on March 1, 2004, on ABS-CBN. The show was hosted by Luis Manzano and Jodi Sta. Maria. The jury is composed of Boy Abunda, Gloria Diaz and Laurenti Dyogi.

== History ==
In 2004, ABS-CBN Talent Center had already produced 11 Star Circle batches which are composed of more than 200 stars. By that year, the talent center is having its audition for Star Circle Batch 12. But after seeing the huge profits that ‘idols’ could rake in, Star Circle changed course and took its new format. From the untelevised regular talent search, Star Circle became a reality-based talent search named as Star Circle Quest or SCQ for short.

The show was then hosted by Luis Manzano and Jodi Sta. Maria, while the jury is composed of Boy Abunda, an entertainment writer, TV host and talent manager; Gloria Diaz, an actress and former beauty queen; and Lauren Dyogi, TV director and writer.

From an estimated 10 thousands who auditioned, 10 lucky hopefuls made it to the Final 10 or called as the Magic Circle of 10, which is composed of Hero Angeles, Sandara Park, Joross Gamboa, Roxanne Guinoo, Melissa Ricks, Neri Naig, Errol Abalayan, Michelle Madrigal, Joseph Bitangcol and Raphael Martinez.

== Grand Questors Night ==
The Grand Questor's night was held in Araneta Coliseum on June 5, 2004. While the Star Circle Kid Quest was held first, the Star Circle Teen Quest started around 9:30 PM. In the Grand Questor's Night, the final five questors shows their talents in acting, singing or dancing to impress the people and the judges to give them a higher score.

Sandara Park won again the Voter's choice award but this didn't help her to become the Grand Questor. Hero Angeles became the Grand Questor by adding the voter's choice and his score from the judges. Roxanne Guinoo won the third place, Joross Gamboa was in the fourth place and Melissa Ricks was in the fifth place.

== Elimination chart ==
Legend
Female	Male	Winner	Runners-Up

Top 2/3/4/5	Mid 2/3	Bottom 2/3/4/5	Eliminated (Out)

Magic Circle of 10	Magic Circle of 5

Week number:		1	2	3	4	5	Grand Questors Night
Elimination date:
Place	Contestant	Result
1	Hero Angeles	Top 5	Mid 3	Bottom 3	Top 3	3rd Top 3	1st Grand Teen Questor
2	Sandara Park	Bottom 3	Top 3	Top 4	Bottom 2	Bottom 2	Runner-up
3	Roxanne Guinoo	Top 5	Top 3	Top 4	Top 3	1st Top 3	Runner-up
4	Joross Gamboa	Top 5	Top 3	Top 4	Bottom 3	2nd Top 3	Runner-up
5	Melissa Ricks	Top 5	Mid 3	Bottom 4	Mid	Bottom 3	Runner-up
6	Neri Naig	Bottom 4	Bottom 2	Bottom 2	Top 3	Out
7	Errol Abalayan	Bottom 2	Mid 3	Top 4	Out
8	Michelle Madrigal	Bottom 5	Bottom 3	Out
9	Joseph Bitangcol	Top 5	Out
10	Raphael Martinez	Out
