= Roxanne Guinoo =

Filipino actress (born 1986)

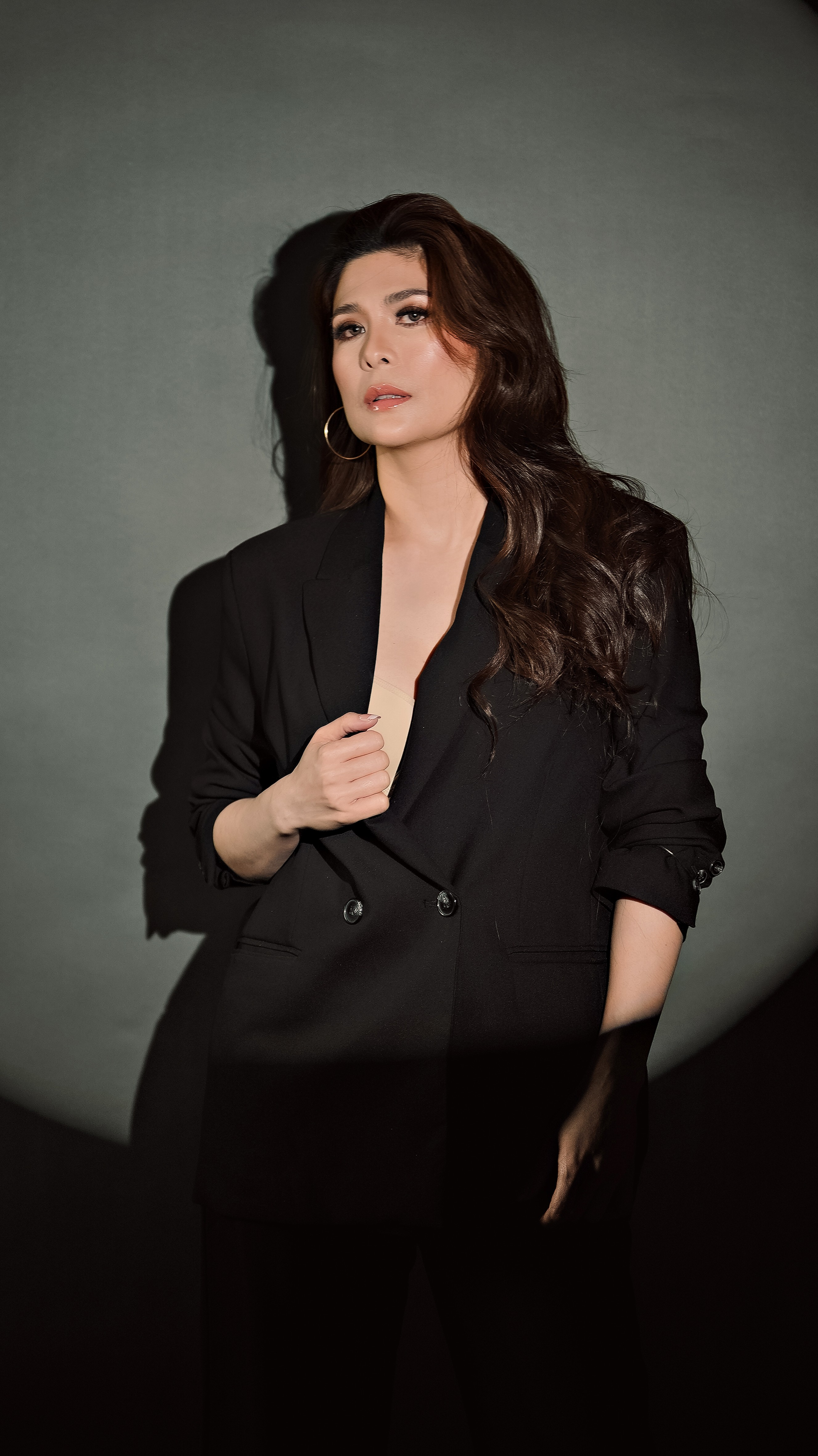
- Born: Roxanne Bosch Guinoo; February 14, 1986 (age 40); Rosario, Cavite, Philippines
- Occupation: Actress
- Years active: 2004–present
- Agents: Star Magic (2004–2012; 2015–present) Talent5 (now Star Worx and MQuest Ventures) (2008–2010; 2012; 2026–present); GMA Artist Center (2012–2015)
- Spouse: Elton Yap (m. 2011)
- Children: 3

Roxanne Bosch Guinoo-Yap (born February 14, 1986) is a Filipino actress. She mostly appears on TV shows but has also starred in movies, such as Now That I Have You, the Shake, Rattle & Roll film series, and D' Anothers.

From April 2012, she was employed by GMA Network, having transferred from ABS-CBN as a contract of GMA Artist Center (now Sparkle GMA Artist Center) for three years. In 2015, she transferred back to her home network ABS-CBN. Before her transfer to GMA Network in 2012, she returned to showbiz as a brief Talent5 (now Star Worx) artist and appeared in Valiente and an episode in Real Confessions. In 2008–2010, she was also with TV5 to appear in Everybody Hapi.

== Career ==
In 2004, Guinoo joined the popular reality TV show Star Circle Teen Quest aired on ABS-CBN and made it into the group of finalists known as the "Magic Circle of 5", along with co-stars Hero Angeles, Sandara Park, Joross Gamboa, and Melissa Ricks. In June 2004, the televised live final was held in Araneta Coliseum, where she finished in second place. She was introduced as one of the newest members of ABS-CBN's Star Magic. She made her ABS-CBN debut in the youth oriented drama SCQ Reload, with her SCQ co-finalists. She gained more acting roles from there, appearing in the romance show Love Spell while also co-hosting Wowowee for a while.

Her big break came when she was cast in a leading role in the 2007 drama series Sineserye Presents: Natutulog Ba ang Diyos?, with local television stars Dina Bonnevie and Rosanna Roces while also appearing with Gamboa and Jake Cuenca. Initially starting at 6:30 pm, it was moved to ABS-CBN's 9:30 primetime slot due to its popularity. She closed out the year by starring in Shake, Rattle and Roll 9, which was shown during that year's Metro Manila Film Festival.

In 2008, she took up her first solo lead role on ABS-CBN with a show entitled Ligaw na Bulaklak which aired in an afternoon slot. She also returned for Shake, Rattle & Roll X that year. It was also during that time that she joined Banana Split, where she got to show her comedy skills. Another comedy series she joined that year was in Everybody Hapi over TV5 (replacing ABC 5) as "Jenny", alongside John Estrada, Eugene Domingo, Long Mejia, Alex Gonzaga and Matt Evans. This marked her first project with the Kapatid Network.

In 2009, Guinoo starred in the superhero television show Komiks Presents: Flash Bomba with Luis Manzano. She also starred in the horror thriller series Florinda. However, she started getting less projects from the network. She used the time not spent for showbiz for her college studies.

She returned to showbiz with TV5 in 2012 and appeared in Valiente and an episode in Real Confessions before moving to GMA Network same year. The following year, she made her main character debuts in Home Sweet Home and Pyra: Ang Babaeng Apoy.

In 2015, she returned to do the TV series Walang Iwanan on her home network ABS-CBN. In 2021, she had her most successful project to date, Hoy, Love You!, a iWant TFC series that saw her reunite with Gamboa. The series lasted for three seasons. That year, she also made a special appearance in The General's Daughter.

As of 2023, she is semi-active in showbiz, occasionally doing TV shows but focusing more on her family life. In 2024, she was cast in the upcoming ABS-CBN drama series Lavender Fields.

== Personal life ==
She married Filipino-Chinese Elton Yap on January 23, 2011. He is a cousin of Tim Yap, the TV host. Together they had a daughter born in September 2010 named Rain Eliana Guinoo-Yap. They also have another daughter, Reine, and a son, Reilly.

From 2004 to 2006 she dated Joross Gamboa, her co-star in Star Circle Quest. In 2007, it was confirmed that she was dating former co-star Jake Cuenca. They first teamed up professionally in Sineserye Presents: Natutulog Ba ang Diyos?. They split by the start of 2008.

== Filmography ==
=== Television ===
Year	Title	Role
2004	Star Circle Quest	Teen Questor / Fab 5 / Herself
2004	SCQ Reload: OK Ako!	Roxanne Roxas
2004–2006	ASAP Fanatic	Host / Herself
2005	SCQ Reload: Kilig Ako!	Roxanne Roxas
2005	Maalaala Mo Kaya: Laptop	Agnes
2005–2007	At Home Ka Dito	Host / Herself
2006	Gulong ng Palad	Jojo
2006	Your Song Presents: To Love Again	
2006	Crazy for You	Trish
2006	Star Magic Presents: 3 Minutes	Jessie
2006	Komiks Presents: Love Spell	Queenie
2007	Lovespell Presents: Line To Heaven	Nikka
2007	Wowowee	Host / Herself
2007	Sineserye Presents: Natutulog Ba ang Diyos?	Gillian Ramirez
2007	Mars Ravelo's Lastikman	Sandy Evilone
2008	Palos	Anna
2008	Maalaala Mo Kaya: Bibliya	Shiela
2008	Ligaw na Bulaklak	Lea Alegro
2008	Banana Split	Herself
2008–2010	Everybody Hapi	Jenny
2009	Maalaala Mo Kaya: Pregnancy Kit	Shirley
2009	Komiks Presents: Flash Bomba	Marissa
2009	May Bukas Pa	Young Nieves Antazo
2009	Sineserye Presents: The Susan Roces Cinema Collection: Florinda	Rachelle
2009	Your Song Presents: Sa Kanya Pa Rin	Monica
2010	Showtime	Judge
2010	Maalaala Mo Kaya: Passbook	Arlen
2012	Valiente	Elaine Lee
2012	Real Confessions: Hindi Bulag ang Pagibig	Louie Zepeda
2013	Home Sweet Home	Dulce Caharian
2013	Pyra: Babaeng Apoy	Barbara Del Fierro / Barbara Lucente
2015	Walang Iwanan	Anita Gonzales-Bautista
2015	Ipaglaban Mo: Ganti ng Sawi	Tessie
2016	Maalaala Mo Kaya: Singsing	Fats
2018	Ipaglaban Mo: Daya	Helen
2018	Maalaala Mo Kaya: Alkansiya	Jucel
2019	The General's Daughter	young 2nd Lt. Amelia Montemayor-Guerrero
2019	Ipaglaban Mo: Depresyon	Joyce
2020	A Soldier's Heart	Mrs. Arguelles
2020	Ampalaya Chronicles: Labyu Hehe	Cora
2021–2022	Hoy, Love You!	Marge
2024–2025	Lavender Fields	Ivy Fernandez†
2026–present	Mommy Guard	Meagan Salazar

=== Films ===
Year	Title	Starring	Role
2004	Now That I Have You		Katherine
2004	Volta	Ai-Ai de las Alas	
2005	D' Anothers	Joross Gamboa	Tetay
2005	Can This Be Love	Joross Gamboa	Bebs
2006	Shake, Rattle & Roll 8		Alyson
2007	Shake, Rattle & Roll 9		Marionne/Bangungot
2008	Shake, Rattle & Roll X	JC De Vera	Dr. Sarah
2009	Tarot	Dennis Trillo	Faye Chan
2009	Yaya and Angelina: The Spoiled Brat Movie	Michael V. & Ogie Alcasid	Ms. Cruz
2020	Finding Agnes	Sue Ramirez & Jelson Bay	
