= Star Circle Quest season 2 =

Star Circle Quest
- Season 2
- Starring: Hosts: Luis Manzano; Jodi Sta. Maria; Jury: Boy Abunda; Gloria Diaz; Laurenti Dyogi

Release
- Original network: ABS-CBN
- Original release: October 11, 2004 – January 29, 2005

Season chronology
- ← Previous; Season 1

Star Circle Quest (season 2) premiered on October 11, 2004, on ABS-CBN. Hosts Luis Manzano and Jodi Sta. Maria and jury members Boy Abunda, Gloria Diaz and Laurenti Dyogi reprised their roles for the second season.

== Contestants ==
=== Stars of Luzon ===
- Alener-Joe Sotelo
- Arron Villaflor
- Haz Ismail
- Alexander Sazon
- Janelle Manahan (later Janelle Quintana)
- Reynan Pitero
- Chretien Kevin Iporac
- Edizon Villegas

=== Stars of Visayas ===
- Mark Pertgen
- Bryan Villarosa
- Vanessa "Vane" Grindrud
- Sciatzy Toepe
- Ken Tiangha
- Camille Vallesar
- Jack Umali
- Christopher Vistal
- Sien Aquino
- Pamela Lizares
- Rogel Sombrero
- Ralf Valdizno

=== Stars of Mindanao ===
- Charles Christianson
- Erika Chriselle Gancayco (later Erich Gonzales)
- Gwend Villanueva
- Ray-an Zurbano
- Ryan R. Torres
- Jayson Villar
- Mario Renze Ibardaloza
- Fernando Divina (Ron Allan Divina)

=== Stars of NCR ===
- Geraldine 'Marla' Boyd
- OJ Decena
- Amparo 'Paw' Diaz, 17
- Nica Escandor
- Bebs and KC Hollman, 14
- Denmark 'DM' Sevilla 17 (DM Sevilla)
- Marvs Luna
- Ian Christian Altura
- Erl Sindrae Benavidez
- Emmanuel Amantillo
- Joanna Sandra Falcis
- Francis Charles Brines
- Joyce Pacis
- Isaac Earl Bautista

=== Stars of USA ===
- Michelle Arciaga
- Sherwin Santos
- Theo Bernados
- Andrei Banta
- Peejay "Mapagmahal" Mandid
- Victor Velarde
- Mark Angelo Dellosa
- Ren Joshua Ramirez
- Melvin Bautista
- Mel Brillo
- Jim Olbes
- Adrian Verzola

== Grand Questors Night ==
The Grand Questors Night was hosted at the PhilSports Arena. The Magic Circle of 5 showcased their talents through individual performances. Erich Gonzales became the Grand Questor, Arron Villaflor was in the second, Paw Diaz in third, Charles Christianson in fourth, and DM Sevilla in fifth place.

== Elimination chart ==
Legend
| Female | Male | Winner | Runners-Up | Wildcard |

| Top 2 | Mid 2 | Bottom Group; Dangerzone | Texter's Choice | Eliminated (Out) |

| Magic Circle of 15 | Magic Circle of 10 | Magic Circle of 5 |

| Elimination number: | | 1 | 2 | 3 | 4 | Wild Card^{1} | 5 | 6 | 7 | 8 | Grand Questors Night |
| Elimination date: | | 11/19/04 | 11/26/04 | 12/03/04 | 12/10/04 | 12/17/04 | 12/31/04 | 01/07/05 | 01/14/05 | 01/21/05 | 01/29/05 |
| Place | Contestant | Result |
| 1 | Erich Gonzales | In; 8.00 | | | | | | | 1st Mid 2 | | 2nd Grand Teen Questor |
| 2 | Arron Villaflor | In; 8.58 | | Bottom 3 | | | Bottom 4 | Texter's Choice | 1st Top 2 | Texter's Choice | 1st Runner-up |
| 3 (12) | Paw Diaz | Out; 6.41 | | | | Winner^{1} | Texter's Choice | | 2nd Mid 2 | | 2nd Runner-up |
| 4 | Charles Christianson | In; 9.00 | | | | | Bottom 4 | | 2nd Top 2 | | 3rd Runner-up |
| 5 | DM Sevilla | In; 7.60 | Dangerzone | | | | | Bottom 3 | Bottom 2 | | 4th Runner-up |
| 6 | Janelle Quintana | In; 8.02 | Dangerzone | | Bottom 4 | | | Bottom 3 | Out |
| 7 | Michelle Arciaga | In; 8.18 | | Texter's Choice | Bottom 4 | | Bottom 4 | Out |
| 8^{2} | Theo Bernados | In; 8.87 | | Bottom 3 | Bottom 4 | | Out |
| 8^{2} | Franz Ocampo | In; 8.40 | | | Out | Out |
| 9 | Jason Abalos | In; 7.21 | Dangerzone | Out | | Out |
| 10 | Bebs & KC Hollmann | In; 7.91 | Out | | | Out |
| 11 | OJ Decena | Out; 6.52 | | | | Out |
| 13 | Vanessa Grindrud | Out; 6.32 | | | | Out |
| 14 | Marla Boyd | Out; 5.82 | | | | Out |
| 15 | Reynan Pitero | Out; 5.42 | | | | Out |

^Note 1 : Jason and Paw have a tie score with 8.29 that's why the judges decided to have a showdown with acting and dancing. Paw got 8.93 then Jason got 7.66 that's why Paw became the winner.Part of the Top 3 in votes were: Paw, Jason and Vanessa
^Note 2 : Due to the Wildcard Twist, there are technically two number 8's.
