= Crazy for You (TV series) =

2006 Philippine television drama series

- Title card
- Genre: Drama; Romance; Comedy
- Created by: ABS-CBN Studios
- Directed by: Romilla Balmaceda
- Starring: Toni Gonzaga; Luis Manzano
- Opening theme: "Crazy for You"
- Composers: John Bettis; Jon Lind
- Country of origin: Philippines
- Original languages: Tagalog; Spanish
- No. of episodes: 48

Production
- Executive producers: Roldeo T. Endrinal; Joan del Rosario
- Production locations: Philippines; Barcelona, Spain
- Running time: 40 minutes
- Production company: Dreamscape Entertainment

Original release
- Network: ABS-CBN
- Release: September 11 – November 30, 2006

Crazy for You is a 2006 Philippine television drama romance comedy series broadcast by ABS-CBN. Directed by Romilla Balmaceda, it stars Toni Gonzaga and Luis Manzano. It aired on the network's Primetime Bida line up from September 11 to November 30, 2006, replacing Calla Lily and was replaced by Sana Maulit Muli.

It is the first television series about overseas Filipino workers (OFWs), followed by 2012 Philippine television drama series Kung Ako'y Iiwan Mo.

The show's title is taken from the 1985 Madonna pop-ballad of the same name. It tackled the story of Wacky (Luis Manzano), a rich hunk and Janice (Toni Gonzaga), a witty-beautiful day-hire maid.

== Premise ==
Janice was forced to embrace a life in Spain as an overseas worker to help out her family. She takes on the job of cleaning the apartment of Wacky, a foreign student in Barcelona. The two never had the chance to meet, they only communicated by posting notes around the house.

One night, Janice and her friends crashed into a party. There she met Wacky and pretended to be a rich girl by the name of “Louis.” They fell for each other at first sight. They danced through the night, without Janice knowing that Wacky is her boss and Wacky had no idea that Louis and Janice are one and the same. As Janice returned to work, she discovers that the Wacky she met at the party is the same person that she was working for. Afraid of how Wacky will react, she hid herself and continued to lie about her identity.

As the communication continued, they fell deeper for each other. But just when happy journey started, Wacky's ex-girlfriend Sabrina (Michelle Madrigal), entered the scene. Still crazy in love with Wacky, she would do everything possible to win him back. And the only way to break the new lovebirds apart was for her to reveal Janice's well kept secret.

== Cast and characters ==
=== Main cast ===
- Toni Gonzaga as Janice
- Luis Manzano as Wacky

=== Supporting cast ===
- John Prats as Paolo
- Pokwang as Blessy
- Michelle Madrigal as Sabrina
- Roxanne Guinoo as Trish
- Joseph Bitangcol as Jomar
- Sandara Park as Ara
- Gab Drilon as Lee
- Valeen Montenegro as Luna
- Aldred Gatchalian as Brix
- Victor Basa as Errol
- Rio Locsin as Melba
- Sylvia Sanchez as Gigi
- Dennis Padilla as Edgardo
- Kristina Paner
- Gloria Romero

== Trivia ==
This was Sandara Park's last appearance on ABS-CBN before leaving Filipino show business and returning to South Korea with her family in 2007, as she was not offered to renew her contract with Star Magic as well as the first TV series to feature her and Joseph Bitangcol along with other SCQ co-teen questors Michelle Madrigal and Roxanne Guinoo, and her first without Hero Angeles who left the network in 2005 upon ended his contract of the said talent agency.

== Cancelled sequel ==
A sequel called, Crazy for You Season 2: The Crazy Sequel was planned to air in late 2007. However, it was cancelled due to the main cast's schedule constraints.
