= Bcuz of U =

2004 Filipino romantic anthology film

- DVD cover with one of the casts signature.
- Directed by: John D. Lazatin; Mae Cruz-Alviar; Cathy Garcia-Molina
- Written by: Mel Mendoza-del Rosario
- Based on: The Yellow Rolls-Royce by Anthony Asquith
- Produced by: Charo Santos-Concio; Malou N. Santos
- Starring: Geoff Eigenmann; Heart Evangelista; Hero Angeles; Sandara Park; Diether Ocampo; Kristine Hermosa
- Cinematography: Gus Cruz; Neil Daza
- Edited by: Vito Cajili
- Music by: Jesse Lucas
- Distributed by: Star Cinema
- Release date: November 17, 2004
- Running time: 116 minutes
- Country: Philippines
- Languages: Filipino; Korean
- Box office: ₱86 million

Bcuz of U is a 2004 Filipino romantic anthology film, starring Kristine Hermosa, Diether Ocampo, Heart Evangelista, Geoff Eigenmann, Hero Angeles and Sandara Park.

It is loosely based on the 1964 UK drama film The Yellow Rolls-Royce, which also adopted the idea of using a car as a device to tell the story from the 1947 German drama film In Those Days (German: In jenen Tagen).

== Synopsis ==
A runaway bride returns, a woman falls for her worst nightmare and two opposites come together in this trio of romantic tales. In the first story, Ria (Kristine Hermosa) tries to win back the man (Diether Ocampo) she left at the altar. In tale two, solitary Cara (Heart Evangelista) meets Mr. Wrong (Geoff Eigenmann) -- or is he? And in the final yarn, a tour guide (Hero Angeles) meets a girl (Sandara Park) who pretends to be a famous actress.

== Plot ==
=== First story ===
Ria (Kristine Hermosa) and RJ (Diether Ocampo) share the perfect relationship until she did not show up on their wedding. Years after, she decided to win him back. But the indecisive and the new RJ is now the most sought-after model in town. Will their love prevail over the pain they've caused each other?

=== Second story ===
Cara (Heart Evangelista) never took a chance on falling in love because she believes that it will only break her heart. That was until she meets Roni (Geoff Eigenmann) but only to find out that he is the kind of man she has been trying to avoid. Will she take the risk this time?

=== Third story ===
Louie (Hero Angeles), a tourist guide, meets April (Sandara Park), a Korean girl who got lost in the city and is left with no choice but to pretend that she is a famous actress in her hometown only to survive. Will it be possible for two very different individuals find home in one another?

== Cast ==
- Kristine Hermosa as Ria
- Diether Ocampo as RJ
- Heart Evangelista as Cara
- Geoff Eigenmann as Roni
- Hero Angeles as Louie
- Sandara Park as April
- Nikki Valdez as Lee
- Desiree Del Valle as Stella
- Ilonah Jean
- Luis Alandy
- Joshua Dionisio
- Gerald Madrid
- Aiza Marquez
- Pen Medina
- Susan Africa
- Yayo Aguila
- Pokwang as Tiya Pards

== Soundtrack ==
The theme song, "Because of You" was composed by Keith Martin and originally released as a duet with Kyla, later originally by Paolo Santos, was performed by Gary Valenciano for the film. Also, this song was performed by Martin Nievera for the 2008 Koreanovela Coffee Prince and Jay R for the Philippine adaptation of the same title that were both aired on GMA Network.

== Trivia ==
Diether Ocampo and Kristine Hermosa from Sana'y Wala Nang Wakas since it ended on July 9, Geoff Eigenmann and Heart Evangelista from Hiram since July 12 as its replacement but Hero Angeles and Sandara Park were the SCQ lead actors as they both remained in SCQ Reload: OK Ako!. Also, this was Ocampo's first and only film with Hermosa (since All My Life released 6 months later on May 26 as her solo actress, where she played Louie). Both of them were Jericho Rosales' former boyfriends.
