= Marla Boyd =

Filipino actress

- Born: Geraldine Marla Boyd; February 25, 1987 (age 39)
- Occupation: Actress
- Years active: 2004–present
- Agent: Star Magic (2004–2011)

Marla Boyd (born Geraldine Marla Boyd; February 25, 1987) is a Filipino actress.

== Biography ==
=== Career ===
Marla didn't have plans of entering showbiz when she came to the Philippines for a vacation. But she enjoyed her vacation so much that she wanted to stay.

She found her reason to stay when she learned about Star Circle Quest. She admits that the idea of staying was actually what prompted her to join the talent search show. She joined the first Star Circle Quest where she didn't get picked. After a year Marla joined Star Circle Quest - Star Circle National Teen Quest where she was one of the top 15 contestants.

After getting bumped off the top 15, she received some offers for acting projects from ABS-CBN. Her first major role to star in ABS-CBN's Ikaw Ang Lahat Sa Akin along ABS-CBN's biggest stars. She played, a villainess out to make Jasmin's (Bea Alonzo) life miserable, Zsa Zsa Ricafort. The role gave her much notice. Marla considers this as her biggest break in Philippine showbiz.

== Filmography ==
Television
Year	Title	Role	Notes
2004	Star Circle Quest	Herself	Contestant
2004–2005	Star Circle Quest - Star Circle National Teen Quest	Herself	Top 15
2005	Ikaw ang Lahat sa Akin	Zsa Zsa Ricafort	
2005	SCQ: Reload OK Ako!	Trixie	
2006	Panday	Violeta	
2008	Your Song: You Win The Game	Sonia	
