= SCQ Reload =

Philippine television drama series

- Promotional title card used for teaser
- Genre: Drama
- Written by: Ted Boborol
- Directed by: Lauren Dyogi
- Starring: Hero Angeles; Sandara Park; Roxanne Guinoo; Joross Gamboa; Melissa Ricks; Michelle Madrigal; Joseph Bitangcol; Neri Naig; Raphael Martinez; Errol Abalayan
- Theme music composer: Jonathan Manalo
- Opening theme: "OK Ako" by Gloc-9 featuring Gayle Dizon and Jay-M
- Ending theme: "OK Ako" by Gloc-9 featuring Gayle Dizon and Jay-M
- Country of origin: Philippines
- Original languages: Tagalog; Korean
- No. of episodes: 104

Production
- Production locations: Manila, Philippines; Seoul, South Korea
- Running time: 60 minutes

Original release
- Network: ABS-CBN
- Release: July 12, 2004 – June 12, 2005

SCQ Reload is a Philippine television drama series broadcast by ABS-CBN. The series is spin-off of Star Circle Quest. Directed by Laurenti Dyogi, it stars Hero Angeles, Sandara Park, Roxanne Guinoo, Joross Gamboa, Melissa Ricks, Michelle Madrigal, Joseph Bitangcol, Neri Naig, Raphael Martinez and Errol Abalayan. Premiered on July 12, 2004, it tackles the story of normal teenagers with their adventures and struggles in life and love. The show concluded on June 12, 2005, with a total of 104 episodes.

== Overview ==
On its first few season the show was entitled SCQ Reload: OK Ako! ("I'm okay!") with the complete former final 10 SCQ finalists. On its second season, the title was changed to SCQ Reload: Kilig Ako! ("I'm kilig!") which excluded Sandara Park due to some commitments, and added new casts including Sarah Geronimo and Japoy Lizardo and guests appearance of Kathryn Bernardo and Joshua Dionisio.

== Cast and characters ==
=== Ok Ako! (2004) ===
Main cast

- Hero Angeles as Hero Roxas
- Sandara Park as Sandara Soh
- Joross Gamboa as Joross Pimentel
- Roxanne Guinoo as Roxanne Roxas
- Melissa Ricks as Melissa Gordon
- Michelle Madrigal as Michelle Revilla
- Joseph Bitangcol as Joseph Fernando
- Neri Naig as Nerizza Santiago
- Raphael Martinez as RJ Roxas
- Errol Abalayan as Errol Roxas

=== Kilig Ako! (2005) ===
Main casts

- Sarah Geronimo as Sarah
- Hero Angeles as Hero Roxas
- Roxanne Guinoo as Roxanne Roxas
- Joross Gamboa as Joross Pimentel
- Melissa Ricks as Melissa Gordon
- Michelle Madrigal as Michelle Revilla
- Joseph Bitangcol as Joseph Fernando
- Neri Naig as Nerizza Santiago
- Raphael Martinez as RJ Roxas
- Errol Abalayan as Errol Roxas
- Jason Abalos as Jason
- Janelle Quintana as Janelle
- Japoy Lizardo
- Charles Christianson

Supporting casts

- Jaclyn Jose as Helen Roxas
- John Arcilla as Dennis Roxas
- Lani Mercado as Tina Roxas
- Bernadette Allyson as Judith Revilla
- Menggie Cobarrubias as Mateo Fernando
- Jennifer Sevilla as Pascuala Fernando
- Ricky Davao as Teodoro Fernando
- Giselle Sanchez as Wang So
- Beverly Salviejo as Leona
- Ya Chang as Himself
- Marla Boyd as Trixie
- Vanessa Grindrud as Tootsie
- DM Sevilla as DM

Guest casts

- Kathryn Bernardo as Jobelle
- Joshua Dionisio as Adolfo

== Accolades ==
Accolades received by SCQ Reload
Year	Award	Category	Recipient	Result	Ref.
2005	19th PMPC Star Awards for Television	Best New Female TV Personality	Melissa Ricks	Won	
