= 19th PMPC Star Awards for Television =

- Date: December 6, 2005
- Location: Patry Central
- Hosted by: Boy Abunda

Television/radio coverage
- Network: IBC-13

The 19th PMPC Star Awards for Television ceremony was held at the Patry Central was taped on December 6, 2005 and was broadcast on IBC-13.

The award ceremony was hosted by Boy Abunda.

== Nominees and winners ==
These are the list of Nominees and Winners:

Best Female TV Host: Regine Velasquez (SOP Rules, GMA-7)

Best Male TV Host: Willie Revillame (Wowowee, ABS-CBN 2)

Best Comedy Actress: Rufa Mae Quinto (Bubble Gang, GMA-7)

Best Comedy Actor: Keempee de Leon (Bahay Mo Ba ‘To?, GMA-7)

Best New Female TV Personality: Melissa Ricks (SCQ Reload: OK Ako, ABS-CBN 2)

Best New Male TV Personality: *Joross Gamboa (Nginiiig, ABS-CBN 2)

Best Celebrity Talk Show Host: Boy Abunda (Homeboy, ABS-CBN 2)

Best Celebrity Talk Show: Homeboy (ABS-CBN 2)

Best Game Show Host: Kris Aquino (Pilipinas: Game K N B?, ABS-CBN 2)

Best Game Show: Pilipinas: Game K N B? (ABS-CBN 2)

Best Variety Show: Eat Bulaga (GMA-7)

Best Musical-Variety Show: ASAP Mania (ABS-CBN 2)

Best Drama Anthology: Maalaala Mo Kaya (ABS-CBN 2)

Best Primetime Drama Series: Mulawin (GMA-7) Winner

Nominees:

- Krystala (ABS-CBN 2)
- Darna (GMA-7)
- Spirits (ABS-CBN 2)
- Hiram (ABS-CBN 2)
- Forever in My Heart (GMA-7)

Best Daytime Drama Series: Now & Forever ‘Mukha’ (GMA-7)

Best Drama Actress: Judy Ann Santos (Krystala, ABS-CBN 2)

Nominees:

- Kris Aquino (Hiram, ABS-CBN 2)
- Claudine Barretto (Marina, ABS-CBN 2)
- Angel Locsin (Darna, GMA-7)
- Ara Mina (Mulawin, GMA-7)
- Regine Velasquez (Forever in My Heart, GMA-7)
- Heart Evangelista (Hiram, ABS-CBN 2)

Best Drama Actor: John Lloyd Cruz (It Might Be You, ABS-CBN 2)

Nominees:

- John Estrada (Hiram, ABS-CBN 2)
- Christopher de Leon (Hanggang Kailan, GMA)
- Deither Ocampo (Sana'y Wala Nang Wakas, ABS-CBN 2)
- Ariel Rivera (Forever in My Heart, GMA)
- Jericho Rosales (Sana'y Wala Nang Wakas, ABS-CBN 2)

Best Single Performance by an Actress: Lorna Tolentino (Magpakailanman:‘Sa Kabila ng AIDS’, GMA-7)

Best Single Performance by an Actor: Baron Geisler (Maalaala Mo Kaya:‘Trolley’, ABS-CBN 2)

Best Gag Show: Bubble Gang (GMA-7) & Goin’ Bulilit (ABS-CBN 2)

Best Comedy Show: Daddy Di Do Du (GMA-7)

Best Showbiz-Oriented Talk Show: The Buzz (ABS-CBN 2)

Best Male Showbiz-Oriented Talk Show Host: Boy Abunda (The Buzz, ABS-CBN 2) & Paolo Bediones (S-Files, GMA-7)

Best Female Showbiz-Oriented Talk Show Host: Cristy Fermin (The Buzz, ABS-CBN 2)

Best Reality Competition Program/Hosts: Paolo Bediones & Ethel Booba (Extra Challenge, GMA-7)

Best Talent Search Program: Search For The Star In A Million (ABS-CBN 2)

Best Talent Search Program Host: Luis Manzano & Jodi Sta. Maria (Star Circle National Teen Quest, ABS-CBN 2)

Best Youth-Oriented Program: Love to Love (GMA-7)

Best Horror-Fantasy Program: Nginiiig (ABS-CBN 2)

Best Lifestyle Show Host: Charlene Gonzalez (At Home Ka Dito, ABS-CBN 2)

Best Lifestyle Show: At Home Ka Dito (ABS-CBN 2)

Best News Program: TV Patrol World (ABS-CBN 2)

Best Female Newscaster: Vicky Morales (Saksi, GMA-7)

Best Male Newscaster: Julius Babao (TV Patrol World, ABS-CBN 2)

Best Magazine Show Host: Korina Sanchez (Rated K, ABS-CBN 2)

Best Magazine Show Rated K (ABS-CBN 2)

Best Documentary Program: I-Witness (GMA-7)

Best Documentary Program Hosts: Karen Davila, Abner Mercado & co. (The Correspondents);

Best Morning Show Host: Tin-Tin Bersola-Babao, Juliss Babao, Bernadette Sembrano, Erwin Tulfo & Co. (Magandang Umaga Pilipinas, ABS-CBN 2)

Best Morning Show: Magandang Umaga Pilipinas (ABS-CBN 2)

Best Public Affairs Program Host: Winnie Monsod & Oscar Orbos (Debate, GMA-7)

Best Public Affairs Program: Debate (GMA-7)

Best Public Service Program Host: Ben Tulfo (Bitag, IBC-13)

Best Public Service Program: Bitag (IBC-13)

Best Educational Program Host: Ricky Reyes (Ricky Reyes Beauty Plus, RPN-9)

Best Educational Program: Ricky Reyes Beauty Plus (RPN-9)

Best TV Station GMA-7

== Special awards ==
Female Star of the Night: Alessandra de Rossi

Male Star of the Night: JC De Vera & Jay Manalo

Female Face of the Night: Angelica Jones

Male Face of the Night: Joseph Bitangcol
