= Flower of Evil (Philippine TV series) =

Philippine thriller drama television series

- Promotional poster
- Genre: Thriller drama; Crime; Mystery; Romance
- Based on: Flower of Evil by Yoo Jung-hee
- Written by: David Diuco; China Gabriel; Hazel Uychiat; Li Candelaria
- Directed by: Darnel Joy Villaflor; Richard Ibasco Arellano
- Starring: Piolo Pascual; Lovi Poe
- Country of origin: Philippines
- Original language: Filipino
- No. of episodes: 32

Production
- Executive producers: Carlo Katigbak; Cory Vidanes; Laurenti Dyogi; Roldeo Endrinal
- Producer: Eleanor Martinez
- Production locations: Metro Manila; Pampanga
- Camera setup: Single-camera
- Running time: 55 minutes
- Production companies: Dreamscape Entertainment; CJ ENM (Note: copyright holder only)

Original release
- Network: Viu
- Release: June 23 – October 7, 2022
- Network: Kapamilya Channel (Note: The series was also broadcast on Jeepney TV and A2Z.)
- Release: June 25 – October 9, 2022

Related
- Flower of Evil

Flower of Evil is a Philippine thriller drama television series based on the 2020 South Korean drama series of the same name, starring Piolo Pascual and Lovi Poe. The series streamed on Viu on June 23, 2022, and was aired on Kapamilya Channel's Yes Weekend primetime block from June 25 to October 9, 2022, replacing the fourth season of I Can See Your Voice and was replaced by Hoy Love You 3.

== Plot ==
Jacob (Piolo Pascual) is a man who hides his identity and past from his wife Iris (Lovi Poe), a female detective. On the surface, they appear to be the perfect family: a loving couple with a beautiful six-year-old daughter who adores her parents.

Iris and her colleagues begin investigating a series of unexplained murders and is confronted with the reality that her seemingly perfect husband may be hiding something from her.

== Cast and characters ==
=== Main cast ===
- Piolo Pascual as Fake Jacob del Rosario / Daniel Villareal
- Lovi Poe as Iris Castillo del Rosario / Iris Castillo Villareal

=== Supporting cast ===
- Paulo Avelino as Real Jacob del Rosario
- Edu Manzano as Henry del Rosario
- Agot Isidro as Carmen del Rosario
- Rita Avila as Gloria Castillo
- Denise Laurel as Grace Villareal
- Joross Gamboa as Rico Gallardo
- Joem Bascon as Dennis Espinosa
- JC de Vera as Andrew Marcelo
- Jett Pangan as Gerry Payumo
- Pinky Amador as Maggie Alcantara
- Joko Diaz as Baldo Ongkiko
- Epy Quizon as Noel Ramirez
- Archie Adamos as Ruel Castro
- Gardo Versoza as Abel Villareal
- Carla Guevara Laforteza as Lilia Ramirez
- Hazel Orencio as Evelyn Claverio
- Sienna Stevens as Luna del Rosario
- Paul Jake Paule as Detective Candelaria

=== Guest cast ===
- Jeffrey Hidalgo as Erwin Santos
- Nikki Valdez as Melanie Santos
- Loren Burgos as Teodora "Teddy" Manangquil
- Yñigo Delen as Carlo Santos
- Claire Ruiz as Susan Mirasol
- Sherry Lara as Belen Soliven
- Jess Mendoza as Lando Soliven
- Junjun Quintana as Vincent Rosales
- Denise Joaquin as Raquel Rosales
- Rolando Innocencio as Ernesto Dimaculangan
- Peewee O'Hara as Tansing Ramos
- Aleck Bovick as Josie Medina
- Sheree Bautista as Monet Dimayuga
- Criza Taa as Young Grace
- Isaiah Dela Cruz as Young Daniel

== Episodes ==
No.	Title	Original release date	TV air date
1	"Encounter"	June 23, 2022	June 25, 2022
Iris, Jacob, and their six-year-old daughter Luna are a picture of a perfect family. Little does Iris know that Jacob and his parents are keeping a secret from her. While investigating an attempted murder case, Iris hears about the serial killings in Corazon.
2	"Abduction"	June 24, 2022	June 26, 2022
In search of Jacob, Rico finds Daniel Villareal, the missing suspect in the murder of Corazon's village chief. Iris sees Jacob in a new light after solving her case assignment, unaware of the bloody secret her husband had buried in their basement.
3	"Dark Past"	June 30, 2022	July 2, 2022
Iris and her team look into the possibility of a copycat killer as they investigate a case similar to the Corazon murders. Jacob reminds Rico of their dark past as the reporter begs for freedom. Later, Iris and Jacob are called into Luna's school.
4	"Haunting Past"	July 1, 2022	July 3, 2022
Coming up with another angle on Belen's murder case, Iris confronts her new suspect. Jacob finds a way to talk with Rico's informant. That night, Vincent's past haunts him when a mysterious figure in a black raincoat comes to silence him completely.
5	"Blackmail"	July 7, 2022	July 9, 2022
Iris' team investigates Vincent's death and discovers his scheduled meeting with Rico. Jacob sneaks into Rico's apartment to get something he can hold against the reporter. His fate suddenly hangs in the balance with the sudden arrival of his wife.
6	"New Ally"	July 8, 2022	July 10, 2022
Rico undergoes a tense questioning by Iris' team right after breaking free from Jacob's clutch. When Daniel becomes the main suspect in Vincent's murder, Rico offers Jacob his help to prove the latter's innocence in the restaurant owner's death.
7	"Face of Truth"	July 14, 2022	July 16, 2022
Rico tries to mislead the crimes unit's investigation as Iris draws closer to putting a face to the Corazon killer's son. However, Jacob finds himself racing against his wife when Iris receives a tip from someone claiming to have a photo of Daniel.
8	"The Killer"	July 15, 2022	July 17, 2022
Iris chases the man who allegedly attacked the informant in Corazon, unaware that it is her husband. She soon pieces together the puzzle about Vincent's murder. Meanwhile, Jacob faces an enemy who has been searching for him for a long time.
9	"New Victim"	July 21, 2022	July 23, 2022
Iris' nightmare materializes upon confirming that Jacob is Noel's new possible victim. With all the indisputable indications laid in front of her, Iris continues to insist on her husband's innocence. Her colleagues, however, think otherwise.
10	"Finding Jacob"	July 22, 2022	July 24, 2022
Noel tortures Jacob in a desperate attempt to find his late wife's remains, blaming the latter for his father's crimes. Iris and her team race against time to locate the suspect's hideout as Jacob finds his life in imminent danger.
11	"Statement"	July 28, 2022	July 30, 2022
Jacob narrowly escapes death, but not the stern interrogation of Iris' colleagues. With Noel surviving the operation, Jacob's problems are far from over, especially after a source with a new piece of information reaches out to his wife.
12	"The Witness"	July 29, 2022	July 31, 2022
Iris investigates her husband after hearing an unintended and shocking revelation from him. While Noel makes one last plea before Jacob finishes him off, Maggie and Rico receive Josie Medina's statement on Lilia Ramirez's case.
13	"Expose"	August 4, 2022	August 6, 2022
Rico becomes the man of the hour after dropping an expose about Abel's alleged accomplice, putting Jacob in a tight spot. While Dennis clings to his hunch about Jacob, Iris fights a silent battle with her discovery about her husband's identity.
14	"Triggered"	August 5, 2022	August 7, 2022
Gloria places Luna under Carmen's care. A ghost from the past pays Rico an unexpected visit to clarify things about the Corazon murder. Despite getting ahold of all the evidence, Iris stops at nothing until the truth comes out of Jacob's mouth.
15	"Reunion"	August 11, 2022	August 13, 2022
Jacob turns to Rico for help in finding Grace and identifying their father's accomplice, unaware that Iris is on his tail. A case hits Iris close to home and makes her hesitant to confront her husband about his real identity.
16	"The Mourner"	August 12, 2022	August 14, 2022
Iris arrives at a decision after overhearing a disturbing confession from Jacob. Together with Grace and Rico, Jacob tries to recall the details connected to Abel's accomplice. Carmen decides to finally put an end to her son's suffering.
17	"Recording"	August 18, 2022	August 20, 2022
Now that the real Jacob is awake, Henry promises a good life and a beautiful family ahead of his son. Iris barges in on the trio’s investigation into Abel's accomplice. Sick of all the lies Jacob continues to feed her, Iris makes a painful decision.
18	"The Agency"	August 19, 2022	August 21, 2022
Luna gets affected by her parents' marital problem. Hoping to change Iris' mind about their marriage, Jacob grows more determined to find his father's accomplice. Iris and her team's search for Abel's missing victim leads them to a suspicious agency.
19	"Agreement"	August 25, 2022	August 27, 2022
Iris' love for Jacob reigns over her many questions and doubts about his dark past. Jacob forges an agreement with Baldo in exchange for the identity of Abel's accomplice. The real Jacob, on the other hand, finally discovers his parents' secret.
20	"Phone Call"	August 26, 2022	August 28, 2022
While Grace tries to remember the face of Abel's accomplice, Jacob helps Iris' team in capturing Baldo's syndicate. Iris goes out of her way to protect her husband, but Dennis acquires a piece of evidence that threatens to put her efforts to waste.
21	"The Transaction"	September 1, 2022	September 3, 2022
Dennis coerces Iris to choose between protecting her husband and fulfilling her sworn duty as a defender of the law. Daniel's transaction with Baldo goes awry, while Grace inches closer to the truth about their father's accomplice.
22	"Acceptance"	September 2, 2022	September 4, 2022
After Iris saved Daniel, the couple is forced to face the truth about their feelings and relationship. Upon learning what Jacob was up to before the incident with Daniel, Henry and Carmen vow to protect their son from Grace's investigation.
23	"Secrets"	September 8, 2022	September 10, 2022
Dennis gives Daniel one last chance to clear his name, but the latter remains resolute in taking his sister's secret to the grave. Unknown to Daniel, Grace is on her way to confess her crime to Iris.
24	"Resignation"	September 9, 2022	September 11, 2022
With the help of an unlikely source, Daniel sets a trap to confirm if Henry was the one who sold him out to Baldo. Evelyn tenders her resignation, only to realize that severing ties with the del Rosarios is not as easy as she thought it would be.
25	"Frame Up"	September 15, 2022	September 17, 2022
Daniel and Iris confront Henry about his connection with Abel and Baldo. However, with Jacob's brilliant criminal mind, the del Rosarios manage to turn the whole situation in their favor. Baldo gets an important person out of the mental hospital.
26	"Fingerprint"	September 16, 2022	September 18, 2022
Iris tries hard to ignore Daniel's suspicious actions. However, when Evelyn's lifeless body gets recovered and enough pieces of evidence confirm the same thing, Iris is forced to do the hardest thing for a wife to do—arrest her own husband.
27	"Alliance"	September 22, 2022	September 24, 2022
The members of the heinous crimes unit are on the hunt for Daniel as he evades arrest and takes Iris with him. In the midst of the chaos involving her parents, Luna suddenly goes missing. Baldo plays his trump card against Jacob.
28	"Fingerprint"	September 23, 2022	September 25, 2022
Baldo resolves to change sides upon hearing Lilia's revelation. Iris gives her team classified information to prove Daniel's innocence, unaware of a traitor in their midst. An uninvited guest pays Grace a visit while she is looking after Luna.
29	"Bloodlust"	September 29, 2022	October 1, 2022
Rage completely takes over Daniel when he learns of Grace's critical condition. Jacob, on the other hand, makes sure that he kills the right target this time. Dennis pieces together information that links the del Rosarios to Abel's real accomplice.
30	"Escape"	September 30, 2022	October 2, 2022
Upon learning that Jacob killed Iris, Daniel goes berserk, dead set on finishing off his father's accomplice once and for all. With the truth coming to light, Henry and Carmen both get arrested for covering up their son’s crimes.
31	"Judgement"	October 6, 2022	October 8, 2022
Iris stops Daniel from committing a crime, but Jacob manages to steal a gun and shoots her husband. Months later, despite longing for Daniel, Iris helps Grace with her case. Henry pays heed to Jacob's plea.
32	"New Beginning"	October 7, 2022	October 9, 2022
Through Iris' help, Daniel finds a witness that could help prove Grace's innocence in the murder of Corazon's village chief. Iris decides to let go of Daniel and start a new beginning with Luna in the province. Henry gets a grip on reality.

== Production ==
=== Development ===
The project was first announced on September 16, 2021, when Lovi Poe officially transferred to ABS-CBN for the first time, with Piolo Pascual returning to the network. Both actors were cast in the lead roles after signing with the network. A story conference was held on November 21, 2021. On 4 February 2022, it was revealed that the series was in the midst of its principal photography. A total of 32 episodes are confirmed for the series, running for sixteen weeks.

=== Casting ===
On November 21, 2021, the rest of the cast were announced in the same day of story conference.

Kit Thompson was originally part of the cast, but was later fired after he was arrested for hitting his former girlfriend. Thompson was replaced by Paulo Avelino.

=== Marketing ===
A short teaser for the series was shown as part of the upcoming projects for Dreamscape Entertainment in 2022. The first teaser was released on May 16, 2022. The second teaser was released on May 20, 2022. Official poster was released on May 23, 2022. The trailer of the series was released on May 31, 2022.

== Release ==
The series was released first on Viu from June 23 to October 7, 2022, 48 hours before its television premiere on Kapamilya Channel, A2Z and Jeepney TV from June 25 to October 9, 2022. It is also released exclusively on iWantTFC and TFC IPTV on July 16, 2022, with the first 6 episodes, 48 hours before its broadcast in the United States and Canada.

=== Re-run ===
The series re-aired on Kapamilya Channel's Primetime Bida weeknight block, A2Z's A2Z Primetime, TV5's TodoMax Primetime Singko, and Jeepney TV's delayed telecast from November 7, 2022, to January 20, 2023, replacing A Family Affair and was replaced by Dirty Linen. It had also re-runs on ALLTV from November 8 to December 28, 2025, replacing the re-runs of the Philippine adaptation of What's Wrong with Secretary Kim.

== Soundtrack ==
Released on July 1, 2022
No.	Title	Lyrics	Music	Artist	Length
1.	"Dito Ka Lang (In My Heart Filipino Version)"	Jonathan Manalo, Trisha Denise Campañer	Kim Min	Moira Dela Torre	3:50
2.	"Huli Na, Huli Na"	KZ Tandingan		KZ Tandingan	4:32
Total length:					8:22

== Accolades ==
Accolades received by Flower of Evil
Year	Awards ceremony	Title	Recipient	Result	Ref.
2022	Tag Awards Chicago	Best Actor (tied)	Piolo Pascual	Won	
2022	Tag Awards Chicago	Best Actress	Lovi Poe	Nominated	
2022	Tag Awards Chicago	Best Supporting Actor	Paulo Avelino	Nominated	
2022	8th RAWR Awards	Actor of the Year	Piolo Pascual	Nominated	
2022	8th RAWR Awards	Digital Series of the Year	Flower of Evil	Nominated	
2022	8th RAWR Awards	Favorite Kontrabida	Paulo Avelino	Nominated	
2022	8th RAWR Awards	Beshie ng Taon	Joross Gamboa	Nominated	
2023	7th GEMS Awards 2023	Best TV Series	Flower of Evil	Nominated	
2023	7th GEMS Awards 2023	Best Performance by an Actor in a Lead Role	Piolo Pascual	Nominated	
2023	7th GEMS Awards 2023	Best Performance by an Actress in a Lead Role	Lovi Poe	Nominated	
2023	7th GEMS Awards 2023	Best Performance by an Actor in a Supporting Role	Joross Gamboa	Nominated	
2023	7th GEMS Awards 2023	Best Performance by an Actress in a Supporting Role	Agot Isidro	Nominated	
2023	ContentAsia Awards	Best TV Format Adaptation (Scripted)	Flower of Evil	Bronze	
