= Ligaw na Bulaklak =

- Title card
- Genre: Drama; Romance
- Created by: ABS-CBN Studios
- Written by: Lobert Villela
- Directed by: Andoy L. Ranay
- Starring: Roxanne Guinoo; Sid Lucero; Ara Mina; Marc Abaya; Coco Martin
- Opening theme: "Buong Buhay Ko" by Sam Milby
- Country of origin: Philippines
- Original language: Filipino
- No. of episodes: 110

Production
- Executive producers: Carlo Katigbak; Cory Vidanes; Laurenti Dyogi; Roldeo Endrinal; Enrico Santos
- Producer: Ellen Nicolas Criste
- Production location: Metro Manila
- Running time: 25-36 minutes
- Production company: Dreamscape Entertainment

Original release
- Network: ABS-CBN
- Release: May 26 – October 24, 2008

Ligaw na Bulaklak (transl. Wild Flower) is a 2008 Philippine television drama broadcast by ABS-CBN. Based on a 1976 Philippine film Mga Ligaw Na Bulaklak. Directed by Andoy L. Ranay, it stars Roxanne Guinoo, Sid Lucero, Ara Mina, Marc Abaya and Coco Martin. It aired on the network's Hapontastic line up and worldwide on TFC from May 26 to October 24, 2008, replacing Prinsesa ng Banyera and was replaced by Pieta.

The series is streaming online on YouTube.

== Synopsis ==
It begins in the 1980s, a time considered to be the peak of horse race betting. Lea is the daughter of a gambling man named Dennis, (Nonie Buencamino), and his wife Marilyn (Jodi Sta. Maria). Marilyn is actually in love with Mon (Isko Moreno). When Lea contracts dengue, Dennis finds out that his daughter's blood type does not match his own nor that Marilyn. This event triggers the changes in Lea's life. When her mother dies thanks to her "suicide", Lea is left alone in a girls' town. Lea blooms into a beautiful woman with the kind man Billy as her only friend but Billy already has romantic feelings for Lea which he is yet to tell her, and by herself, she will search the truth about her life, her true love (Billy) and her real self. Lea's decision to return to the horse racetrack would be the start of her long and winding journey of many discoveries and revelations. Lea decides to seek her long-lost family.

== Cast and characters ==
=== Main cast ===
- Roxanne Guinoo as Lea Alegro, a horse whisperer. She moves into Mrs. Reyes' boarding house while searching for her lost siblings. She is a childhood friend of Billy, and the alleged biological daughter of her employer, Mon. Later in the series, Lea discovers that Janet is her long-lost sister Jennifer.
- Ara Mina as Janet/Jennifer Alegro, the adopted daughter and assistant of Mon, whom Mon rescued after taking pity on her. Janet is a distrustful and hateful person who despises Lea. She is the real Jennifer Alegro, Lea's half-sister, who was separated from Ronel at a young age, taken in by a lady named Loida, and grew up within the world of prostitution. She is in love with Francis.
- Sid Lucero as Billy Sandoval, Lea's childhood sweetheart
- Marc Abaya as Francis, the adopted son of Mon. He is Mrs. Reyes' long-lost son, and in love with Lea
- Coco Martin as Ronel Alegro / Fake Chris Espiritu, who comes from a political family and is the vice mayor of their town. He is actually Dennis's long-lost son. When they are separated, Jojo adopts him as his own, hence called Chris Espiritu plotted to kill Lea, so that she would not spoil his secret. He held Lea at gun-point but did not shoot her. He killed Michael for planning to spoil his secret.

=== Supporting cast ===
- Nonie Buencamino as Dennis Alegro, Lea's abusive father. He was a bookie at the racetrack and is a gambler, alcoholic, and war freak.
- Isko Moreno as Mon D. Rodriguez, Lea's employer. Originally a bookmaker, he became rich enough to buy his own horses and a luxurious resort. He is Dennis' arch enemy and the adopted father of Janet (Jennifer).
- Arlene Muhlach as Mrs. Cristina Reyes, the boarding house owner
- Smokey Manaloto as Monching, Mrs. Reyes' partner and Lea's father figure
- Dominic Ochoa as Jojo Espiritu, the mayor of Makati City. He is an obsessive gambler. Mrs. Reyes later reveals to Francis that Jojo Espiritu is his biological father.
- Matteo Guidicelli as Michael Espiritu, the younger brother of Cris, and a member of the Espiritu family. He had a love triangle relationship with Fatima and Precious.
- Erich Gonzales as Fatima, one of Lea's best friend in the boarding house of Mrs. Reyes.
- Carla Humphries as Precious, Lea's friend at foster home and boarding house. Initially, she was envious of Lea's beauty and talent, but they later became best friends.
- Ina Feleo as Misty, a friend of Lea and boarder of Mrs. Reyes. She is Precious' older sister.
- Jaymee Joaquin as Rita, a news reporter, and one of Lea's best friends
- Ron Morales as Ian, nephew of Mrs. Reyes, who has a secret crush on Lea
- Kristofer Dangculos as Chuckie, foster son of Mrs. Reyes

=== Recurring cast ===
- Jon "Chokoleit" García as Aljon, the horse-racing announcer at the racetrack and Billy's sidekick
- Alchris Galura as Ronel, a patient in a mental institution. He is the real Chris, Michael's brother.
- Tetchie Agbayani as Mina, Mon's sister and a money fanatic

=== Guest cast ===
- Jodi Sta. Maria as Marilyn, Lea, Jennifer and Ronel's mother
- Joross Gamboa as Ricky, Billy's cousin
- Jane Oineza as Lilette, Chuckie's friend
- Celine Lim as young Lea
- Joshua Cadelina as young Billy
- Julia Montes as adolescent Jennifer
- CJ Navato as young Ronel
- Diana Malahal
- Joel Saracho
- Jacq Yu

== Theme song ==
The theme music is "Buong Buhay Ko" (lit. My Whole Life) interpreted by Sam Milby.
