= Real Confessions =

- Title card
- Genre: Anthology
- Created by: TV5 Network Inc.
- Written by: various
- Directed by: various
- Presented by: Cristy Fermin
- Theme music composer: Boy Christopher Ramos
- Opening theme: "Ito ang Buhay Ko" by Frenchie Dy
- Country of origin: Philippines
- Original language: Tagalog
- No. of episodes: 14

Production
- Executive producer: Manuel V. Pangilinan
- Running time: 45-60 minutes

Original release
- Network: TV5
- Release: November 5, 2011 – February 11, 2012

Real Confessions is a Philippine television drama anthology series broadcast by TV5. Hosted by Cristy Fermin, it aired from November 5, 2011 to February 11, 2012, replacing Sugo Mga Kapatid and was replaced by Super Sine Prime.

It features life stories of ordinary Filipino's, same format as Maalaala Mo Kaya from the rival network on ABS-CBN except of the one-on-one interview of the story holder with Cristy Fermin. It was formerly known as Star Confessions which features life stories of local celebrities. The first episode on November 5, 2011, with the episode "Sulat sa Langit" starring Gelli de Belen and Wendell Ramos.

The show recently won the Best Theme Song Award on the 2011 Asian TV Awards for its themesong Ito Ang Buhay Ko composed by Boy Christopher Ramos.

== List of episodes ==
Title	Story Holder	Actor	Date
1. Sulat sa Langit	Roy dela Cruz	Gelli de Belen, Wendell Ramos, Jairus Aquino	November 5, 2011
2. Sanib ng Mambabarang	Estanislao Evangelista	Makisig Morales, Alma Moreno, Julio Diaz, Archie Adamos	November 12, 2011
3. Mga Pinutol na Pangarap	Maricel Apanta	Karel Marquez, Ella Guevara, Suzette Ranillo, Bing Pimentel, Buboy Garovillo	November 19, 2011
4. Batang Bayani	Janela Lelis	Celine Lim, Janus del Prado, Bella Flores	November 26, 2011
5. Grade 1 si Lola	Felomina Zamora	Laurice Guillen	December 3, 2011
6. Isang Katauhan, Dalawang Kasarian	Mel Makapugay	Joseph Bitangcol, Tetchie Agbayani, Nonie Buencamino, Diane Medina, Dr. Camille Garcia	December 10, 2011
7. Pasan Ko, Buhay Mo	Giovanni and George Rubio	Lester Llangsang, Alwyn Uytingco, Rio Locsin, Allan Paule, BJ Go	December 17, 2011
8. Kulay ng Buhay	Arjohn Gilbert	Arjohn Gilbert, Emilio Garcia, Ana Capri, Morissette	December 24, 2011
9. Sundalo, Bayani, Kapatid	2nd Lt. Delfin Khe	Rodjun Cruz	January 7, 2012
10. Tinig ng Pangungula	Wanlu	Bayani Agbayani	January 14, 2012

== Awards and nominations ==
- Best Theme Song award for its song "Ito Ang Buhay Ko" (2011 Asian TV Awards)

== See also ==
- List of TV5 (Philippine TV network) original programming
