= Hoy, Love You! =

Philippine streaming television series

- Genre: Romantic comedy Sitcom
- Written by: Ronald Allan Habon
- Directed by: Theodore Boborol
- Starring: Joross Gamboa; Roxanne Guinoo
- Opening theme: "Hoy, Love You!" by Ogie Alcasid and Regine Velasquez
- Composer: Jonathan Manalo
- Country of origin: Philippines
- Original languages: Filipino; English
- No. of seasons: 3
- No. of episodes: 17

Production
- Executive producers: Carlo Katigbak; Cory Vidanes; Jaime Lopez; Ginny Monteagudo-Ocampo
- Producers: Raquel Frieda Buenvenida; Camille Mendigorin
- Production locations: Barangay Sawang, Lobo, Batangas
- Editor: Alexces Megan Abarquez
- Running time: 40–50 minutes

Original release
- Network: iWantTFC
- Release: January 18, 2021 – October 21, 2022

Hoy, Love You! is a Philippine romantic comedy streaming television series starring Joross Gamboa and Roxanne Guinoo. The series premiered on iWantTFC on January 18, 2021. The series has been renewed for a second season, which premiered on September 11, 2021. On June 3, 2022, the series has been renewed for a third season which premiered on September 30, 2022.

== Premise ==
Single parents Jules and Marge are in pursuit of their personal dreams in life for themselves and their respective children. The two accidental meet each other but soon develops a close relationship when they are both assigned to work on a construction project together in the province.

== Cast and characters ==
Main Cast:

- Joross Gamboa as Jules
- Roxanne Guinoo as Marge
- Aljon Mendoza as Charles
- Karina Bautista as Kara

Supporting Cast:

- Dominic Ochoa as Richard
- Carmi Martin as Madam Elizabeth
- Keanna Reeves as Aling Malu
- Yamyam Gucong as Bart
- Pepe Herrera as Tommy
- TJ Valderrama as Drew
- Brenna Garcia as Johanna Rose
- Ketchup Eusebio as Temyong (season 2–3)
- Ritz Azul as Mica (season 2)
- Hasna Cabral as Kitty (season 2)
- Lou Veloso as Lolo Bruno (season 2–3)
- Kate Alejandrino as Agnes (season 3)
- Donna Cariaga as Doctor Kaye Wanda (season 3)
- Race Matias as Kulas (season 3)

== Episodes ==
Season	Episodes	Originally released	
Season	Episodes	First released	Last released
1	7	January 21, 2021	January 24, 2021
2	6	September 11, 2021	October 16, 2021
3	4	September 30, 2022	October 21, 2022

=== Season 1 ===
No. overall	No. in season	Title	Original release date
1	1	"Episode 1"	January 18, 2021
Marge, a single mom and interior designer, meets Jules, a widower and small-time contractor, in a small accident that starts off their acquaintance on the wrong foot. Teamed up for a renovation project in the scenic town of Lobo, Batangas, the two develop an unexpected friendship. As they are forced to work closely together, feelings start bubbling under the surface.
2	2	"Episode 2"	January 19, 2021
Jules musters up the courage to declare his intentions for Marge as the renovation project nears completion. Poised to make his move, someone important from Marge's past arrives and throws his plans up in the air. Now, Jules must not only vie for Marge's affection, but also prove himself to be the better man.
3	3	"Episode 3"	January 20, 2021
Jules keeps getting his attempts at wooing Marge thwarted by Richard. He tries to win some brownie points when he and his daughter JR are invited to a picnic that Richard organized. As they spend time together, several secrets are revealed.
4	4	"Episode 4"	January 21, 2021
JR and Charles make their way to a hidden island, where they bond and share how they feel about their parents' romance. Jules, Marge (Roxanne Guinoo-Yap), and Richard rush to get to their children, thinking they have run away and are in need of rescue. Meanwhile, the source of the bad blood between Elizabeth and Malu is revealed.
5	5	"Episode 5"	January 22, 2021
Jules works to win over Elizabeth, and shows that he is capable of providing for Marge and her son. As he tries to impress his girlfriend's family, he unknowingly neglects his friends.
6	6	"Episode 6"	January 23, 2021
As Marge turns down a surprise marriage proposal from Richard, Jules is brought to thinking that he is getting in the way of reuniting their family. Meanwhile, things between Elizabeth and Malu come to a head in a catfight.
7	7	"Episode 7"	January 24, 2021
Jules decides to step back to keep himself from getting in the way of Marge's chance to put her family back together. He strives to focus on the construction firm, while Marge halfheartedly prepares for her family's flight to London. Torn between what their minds and hearts are saying, their loved ones give them a little nudge to go for what they truly want.

=== Hoy Love You Two (Season 2) ===
No. overall	No. in season	Title	Original release date
8	1	"One Step Forward, Two Steps Back"	September 11, 2021
9	2	"Who’s the Boss"	September 18, 2021
10	3	"Little by Little"	September 25, 2021
11	4	"Are You Kid-Ding Me"	October 2, 2021
12	5	"Sweets For My Sweet"	October 9, 2021
13	6	"Always Be My Baby"	October 16, 2021

=== Hoy Love You 3 (Season 3) ===
No. overall	No. in season	Title	Original release date
14	1	"Baby, Baby, Baby Oh"	September 30, 2022
Marge and Jules find out they are having a baby, but are warned to prepare for some difficulties along the way. Richard announces his role in the town's newest construction company.
15	2	"Hello, is It Me You're Looking For?"	October 7, 2022
Elizabeth and Malu badger Marge with pregnancy advice. Richard tries to recruit Jules' friends to the new construction company. Kara's old friend Kulas keeps winning everyone over, while Tommy takes a shine to newcomer Agnes.
16	3	"Shock-Shock-Shock, Who's There?"	October 14, 2022
Rumors of an "aswang" on the loose and an elevated blood pressure set the pregnant Marge on the edge. Charles and JR plan a double date to keep things platonic between Kara and Kulas. Tommy recruits Jules, Bart, and Drew to help him serenade Agnes.
17	4	"We Are Family"	October 21, 2022
Jules and the family plan a gender reveal party for Marge. Charles' insecurities about Kulas come to a head during a beach cleanup. A complication threatens Marge and the baby.

== Production ==
Marvin Agustin and Jolina Magdangal were initially cast to lead the series. In November 2020, Agustin left the project at the last minute, prompting the production to find a replacement.

== Release ==
=== Broadcast ===
The show's first season had its Philippine TV Premiere from July 31 to September 11, 2021, on Yes Weekend Saturday primetime on Kapamilya Channel, Kapamilya Online Live and A2Z replacing Bawal Lumabas: The Series and was replaced by Unloving U.

Hoy Love You 3 premiered on October 15 to November 13, 2022, on Yes Weekend Sunday primetime on Kapamilya Channel, Kapamilya Online Live and A2Z replacing Flower of Evil and was replaced by Dream Maker. It also aired international via TFC (The Filipino Channel).
