= Neri Naig =

Filipina actress

Neri Naig-Miranda
- Born: Nerizza Garcia Naig; September 7, 1983 (age 42) (Note: Naig penned a birthday message on Instagram that was posted on the day of her birth, September 7, while several news outlets indicated her age at the time of their writing, placing her year of birth at 1983); Quezon City, Philippines
- Education: University of Baguio(BBA)
- Occupation: Actress
- Years active: 2004–present
- Agent(s): Star Magic (2004–2017)
- Spouse: Chito Miranda (m. 2014)
- Children: 2

Nerizza Garcia Naig-Miranda (born 7 September 1983), better known as Neri Naig, is a Filipino actress. She was discovered after joining Star Circle Quest, a reality show of ABS-CBN in search of new actors and actresses. In the show, she landed as the 6th runner-up.

== Career ==
Naig joined Star Circle Quest but was not able to bag the title. After an absence of several years, she staged a career comeback with the help of her manager Boy Abunda. She has been featured in shows like SCQ Reload: OK Ako!Kilig Ako!, Panday, Sana Manulit Muli, Ysabella and a vampire in Imortal.

== Personal life ==
In 2014, Naig and Chito Miranda – vocalist of the band Parokya ni Edgar – married twice: in a civil ceremony on 13 December and in a formal wedding in Tagaytay the following day. In August 2015, Naig's pregnancy suffered from a miscarriage. Their first child, a son, Miggy Alfonso was born in November 22, 2016. Their second child, Manuel Alfonso aka Cash, was born in October 8, 2021. As of December 2021, the couple are also in the process of officially adopting Pia who is Naig's niece.

=== Controversies ===
On August 3, 2013, three video clips of Miranda having sex with three women on different occasions were shown on YouTube. The video with Naig became viral online. On his Twitter account, Miranda said his room was recently robbed. Among those stolen was his hard disk drive, where photo and video files were stored. On Parokya ni Edgar's Facebook page and on Miranda's Instagram page, Miranda apologized for the scandal. A second clip was uploaded on a Facebook page.

In February 2016, the Cebu Regional Trial Court Branch 5 issued a warrant of arrest for cyberlibel against Naig and Danilyn Nunga, her road manager for posting an Instagram photo of two complainants portrayed as bogus sellers of a digital camera.

On November 23, 2024, Naig was arrested for 14 counts of fraud and was detained in Pasay. She was released following a court order on December 4, while the charges against her were dismissed on February 12, 2025.

== Filmography ==
=== Film ===
Year	Title	Character
2004	Now That I Have You	Joey
2005	Nasaan Ka Man	young Lilia
2005	D' Anothers	Rachelle
2011	Bulong	Lala
2015	All You Need Is Pag-ibig	Ellen

=== Television ===
Year	Title	Character
2004	SCQ Reload: OK Ako!/Kilig Ako!	Nerizza "Neri" Santiago"
2005	Panday	Florentina
2006	Your Song: Cuida	Ria
2007	Sana Maulit Muli	Bianca
2007	Ysabella	Young Lupe
2008	Your Song	
2010	Precious Hearts Romances Presents: Martha Cecilia's Kristine	Rowena
2010	Imortal	vampire
2011	Mula sa Puso	Jaja Lampaz / Fake Selina Pereria-Matias
2011	Guns and Roses	Young Marlene Montano
2012	Wako Wako	Carmen
2012	Precious Hearts Romances: Hiyas	Laura
2012	e-Boy	Linda Velasquez
2012	Pahiram ng Sandali	Regina
2014	The Legal Wife	young Eloisa Santiago
2014	Obsession	Bernadette Cabrera
2014	Dream Dad	Angel San Jose
2015	All Of Me	Princess Dimaculangan
2016	Ipaglaban Mo!: Dahas	Teresa
