= The Fighting Chefs =

- Film poster
- Directed by: Ronn Rick
- Screenplay by: Ronnie Ricketts; Joey Chua
- Produced by: Vic del Rosario Jr.; Mariz Ricketts
- Starring: Ronnie Ricketts; Chef Boy Logro
- Cinematography: Renato de Vera
- Edited by: Gerry Marto
- Music by: Sherwin Castillo
- Production companies: Viva Films; MVP Pictures; Rocketts Productions
- Distributed by: Viva Films
- Release date: March 6, 2013
- Running time: 110 minutes
- Country: Philippines
- Language: Filipino

The Fighting Chefs is a 2013 Philippine action comedy film directed by and starring Ronnie Ricketts and features celebrity chef Boy Logro in his feature film debut. This was also Mark Gil's final film appearance until his death on September 1, 2014.

== Synopsis ==
A group of chefs is divided into two fighting groups after learning they only have three months before they're all fired from their restaurant.

== Cast ==
- Ronnie Ricketts as Master Chef
- Arci Muñoz
- Mark Gil as Don Manolo (Friend of Master Chef)
- Boy Logro
- Dinky Doo
- PJ Cuartero
- Tiara Santos
- Billy James Renacia
- Hero Angeles as Ivan
- Roldan Aquino
- Hideaki Torio
- Rey Bejar
- Nadine Lustre
- Jade Lopez
- Jeffrey Santos
- Gene Padilla
- John Hall
- Onyok Velasco
- Joross Gamboa
- Roi Vinzon as Daryl (as Villain Role and Don Manalo's arrogant brother)
- Boy Roque as Daryl's man (as Villain Goon Role)
- Bruce Ricketts
- Roy Alvarez as Manager of Restaurant
- DCoy
- Beatriz
- Natalia Moon
- Ara Mina (cameo, as herself)
- Cristina Sambrano
- Shalala
- Vandolph Quizon
- Yoyong Martirez
- Mariz Ricketts
- Marella Ricketts
- Vic Belaro as Policeman No. 1
- Polly Cadsawan as Policeman No. 2
- Paolo Serrano as Cell Phone Snatcher
