= CJ Navato =

Filipino actor (born 1996)

Christianne Jose "CJ" Navato
- Born: Christianne Jose B. Navato; September 13, 1996 (age 29); Manila, Philippines
- Education: De La Salle–College of Saint Benilde
- Occupations: Actor; Dancer; Singer
- Years active: 2004–present
- Agent: Star Magic (2004–present)
- Height: 5 ft 9 in (175 cm)

Christianne Jose B. Navato (born September 13, 1996) is a Filipino actor, dancer and singer under ABS-CBN's Star Magic.

== Early life and education ==
CJ Navato was born on September 13, 1996, in the Philippines. He attended Elizabeth Seton School in Las Piñas City during his elementary years. He also had experienced travelling to Germany with his mother and grandmother at a young age. Since childhood, he is known to have talents in dancing, singing, and doing Martial Arts (Taekwondo). Before joining the entertainment world, he had joined spelling and singing contests.

== Career ==
=== Acting debut ===
He made his first television appearance at the age of seven ever since joining ABS-CBN's talent search Star Circle Quest: Kids Edition in 2004, where he got in "Magic Circle of 5" and became the fourth placer.

=== 2004: Star Circle Quest ===
In 2004, Navato joined the reality-based talent competition named Star Circle Quest on ABS-CBN. Together with the other contestants, Navato had undergone talent training, physical enhancement and different challenges to test their talent skills. His reason for joining the said talent show was because he wanted to be an artist, an actor, and to improve his skills and talent. During this period, he admires Robin Padilla, Bong Revilla, Rico Yan, and Kyla. He managed to be in the "Magic Circle of 5" with fellow competitors Nash Aguas, Sharlene San Pedro, Aaron Junatas, and Mikylla Ramirez. During the "Grand Questors Night held in June 2004 in Araneta Coliseum, Navato placed fifth. Since then, he became a part of Star Magic with an exclusive contract with ABS-CBN.

=== 2005: Goin' Bulilit ===
In February 2005, Navato was cast in the newly-launched sketch comedy gag show, Goin' Bulilit, featuring children in various comedic situations. He was a main cast until 2008 where he graduated with Kathryn Bernardo, Steven Fermo, Jane Oineza, and Mikylla Ramirez. The "Fifth Batch Graduates" left because the show is for kids, while they are already growing up older.

=== 2012–2016: Luv U ===
In February 2012, Navato became a part of the main cast of ABS-CBN's teen comedy series named Luv U. He portrays Boom Enriquez, a teenage school boy who is partnered opposite April Muñoz, portrayed by Angeli Gonzales. After his graduation, it was announced that his father forced Boom to enter the Philippine Military Academy. The show enables the cast to create a real-life friendship as Navato states that they "work as a team".

=== 2021: Your Face Sounds Familiar (season 3) ===
In 2021, Navato became a part of the third season of Your Face Sounds Familiar, with the moniker The Viral Crooner. He placed 6th in the said season.

== Filmography ==
=== Film ===
Year	Title	Role
2013	Pagpag: Siyam na Buhay	Justin
2016	Kusina	Teen Peles
2018	Class of 2018	Migs

=== Television ===
Year	Title	Role
2004	Krystala	young Igo
2004	Star Circle Quest	Himself
2004–2022	Maalaala Mo Kaya	Various role
2005	Ikaw ang Lahat sa Akin	young Third
2005	Mga Anghel na Walang Langit	Jerome
2005	Vietnam Rose	young Tam
2005	Nginiig	
2005–2008	Goin' Bulilit	Himself
2007	Salam Ato	
2007	Maging Sino Ka Man	young Eli
2008	Komiks Presents: Tiny Tony	Waluigi
2008	Ligaw na Bulaklak	young Ronel
2010	Juanita Banana	Young Joaquin Buenaventura
2011	Reputasyon	Teen Henry
2012–2016	Luv U	Boom Enriquez
2012	Wansapanataym: Gising Na, Omar	Rommel
2014	Wansapanataym: Witch-A-Makulit	Yano
2014	Forevermore	Dexter
2017–2020	Dok Ricky, Pedia	Thor
2021	Your Face Sounds Familiar 3	Himself / Contestant
2022	Run to Me	Dranreb Uy
2023	Dirty Linen	Dennis
2025	Incognito	Vince
2025	It's Okay to Not Be Okay	a nurse

=== Theater ===
Year	Title	Role	Ref.
2019	Charot	Millennial Boy	
2024	One More Chance, The Musical	Popoy	
2025	Kislap at Fuego	Ezequiel	
2025	Liwanag sa Dilim	Cris	
2025	Side Show (Philippines)	Terry Connor	
