= Ikaw ang Lahat sa Akin =

2005 Philippine television drama series

- Title card
- Also known as: Only You
- Genre: Melodrama; Soap opera Romance
- Created by: ABS-CBN Studios
- Written by: Honey Hidalgo; Generiza Reyes; John Roque
- Directed by: FM Reyes; Jerome Chavez Pobocan; Rory Quintos
- Starring: Claudine Barretto; Diether Ocampo; Angelika Dela Cruz; Bea Alonzo; John Lloyd Cruz; Shaina Magdayao
- Opening theme: "Ikaw ang Lahat sa Akin" by Ella May Saison
- Composer: Cecile Azarcon
- Country of origin: Philippines
- Original language: Tagalog
- No. of seasons: 2
- No. of episodes: 125

Production
- Executive producer: Darnel Joy R. Villaflor
- Production location: Philippines
- Running time: 30 minutes
- Production company: Star Creatives

Original release
- Network: ABS-CBN
- Release: May 16 – November 4, 2005

Ikaw ang Lahat sa Akin (International title: Only You / transl. you're everything to me) is a 2005 Philippine television drama series broadcast by ABS-CBN. It was directed by Rory Quintos, FM Reyes and Jerome Chavez Pobocan, and starred Claudine Barretto, Diether Ocampo, Angelika Dela Cruz, John Lloyd Cruz, Bea Alonzo, and Shaina Magdayao. It aired on the network's Primetime Bida line up from May 16 to November 4, 2005, replacing 'Til Death Do Us Part, and was in turn replaced by Panday.

== Synopsis ==
Nea Cruz Fontanilla (Claudine Barretto) and Jasmin Cruz Fontanilla (Bea Alonzo) are sisters, although they haven't seen each other since Nea was five years old and Nea's father Larry (Noni Buencamino) abandoned both her and her mother Elena (Jaclyn Jose) to live with the rich, cruel Yolanda (Carmi Martin).

Years after their traumatic separation, Nea and Jasmin's paths cross again. Raised in above-average circumstances by Larry and Yolanda, along with her stepsister Hazel (Shaina Magdayao), Jasmin is a shy girl in school and the target of pranks by Oliver Ynares (John Lloyd Cruz), the mischievous younger son of the prominent Ynares clan.

As an old-money family, Ynares patriarch Roden (Tirso Cruz III) and matriarch Susana (Hilda Koronel) have given up on Oliver, setting their hopes instead on the intelligent Ivan (Diether Ocampo) to fulfill their dreams of a politician in the family. Unknown to Ivan's family - and his beautiful, rich, and devoted girlfriend Karri Medrano (Angelika Dela Cruz) - Ivan has a dark secret that he kept hidden from those he loves, which now threatens to destroy the life he has built.

While Jasmin and Oliver's lives are about to take an interesting turn, an unexpected change comes from Nea, who is now dead-set on destroying the life of her estranged father.

On the same day that Nea's mother dies, Nea is picked by a strange man who drugs who takes advantage of her. She later learns it was Ivan Ynares. Jasmin and Oliver break up due to Nea's rape allegations and also because Oliver thinks Jasmin was cheating on him with her childhood friend.

Nea goes to court, but before it starts she is bombed by Roden's men. Susana leaves the house and breaks up with Roden when she finds out Roden was cheating on her with Yolanda. In response, Roden vowed to take his revenge on the Fontenellier family.

== Cast and characters ==
Main cast

- Claudine Barretto as Nea Cruz-Fontanilla
- Diether Ocampo as Ivan Ynares
- Angelika Dela Cruz as Karri Medrano-Ynares
- John Lloyd Cruz as Oliver Ynares
- Bea Alonzo as Jasmin Cruz-Fontanilla / Daisy
- Shaina Magdayao as Hazel Gerochi-Fontanilla

Supporting cast

- Geoff Eigenmann as Ricardo 'Third' Fernando III
- Jaclyn Jose as Elena Cruz
- Tirso Cruz III as Roden Ynares
- Hilda Koronel as Susana Ynares
- Carmi Martin as Yolanda Gerochi-Fontanilla
- Nonie Buencamino as Larry Fontanilla
- Kathleen Hermosa as Vonnie
- Rayver Cruz as Nat
- Vanna Garcia as Daphne
- DM Sevilla
- Glaiza de Castro as Magnolia Cortez
- Kiko Matos
- Raphael Martinez
- Pia Moran
- Marita Zobel
- Julia Montes as young Jasmin
- CJ Navato as young Third
