= Joross Gamboa =

Filipino actor (born 1984)

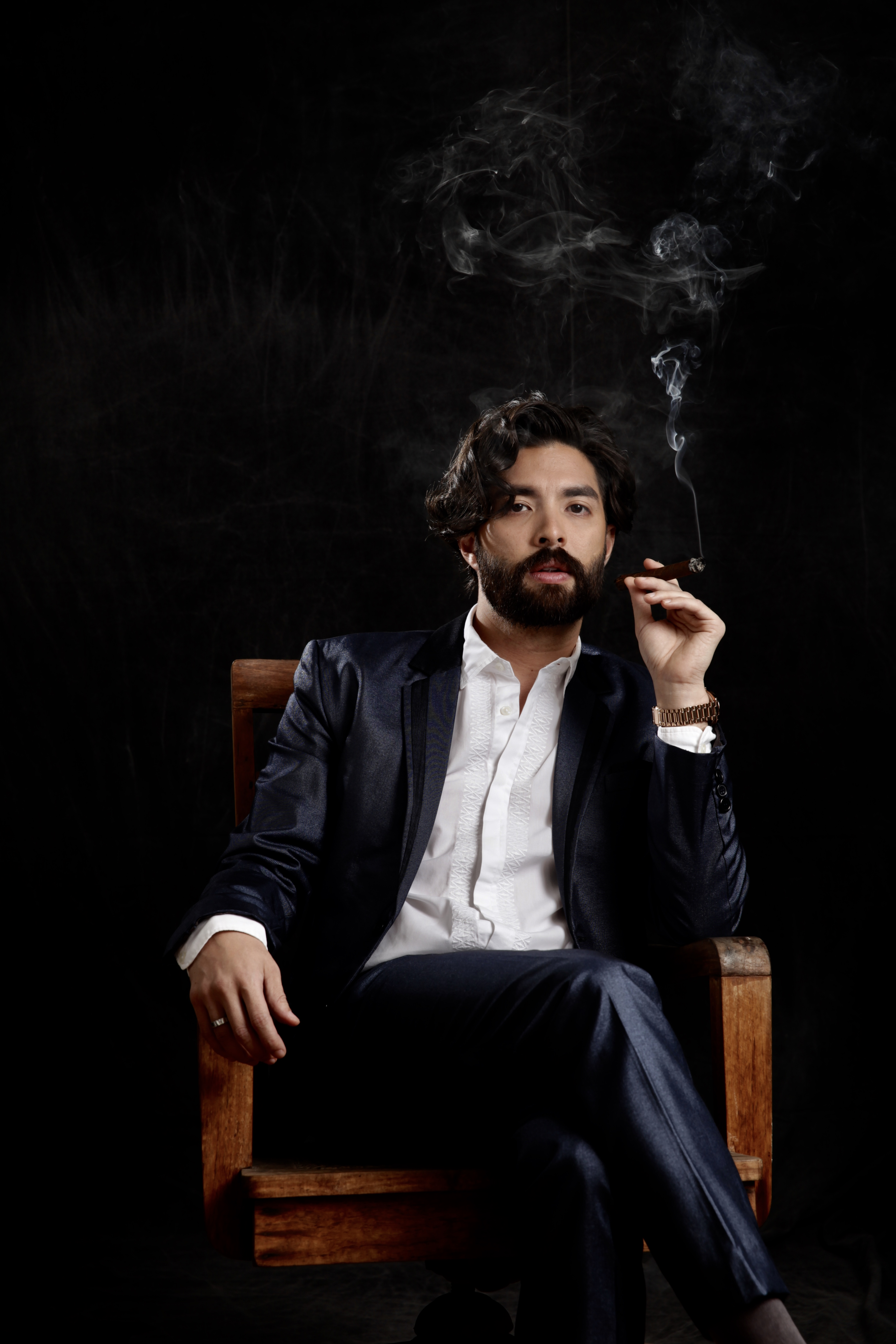
- Gamboa in 2019
- Born: John Ross Sanchez Gamboa; November 28, 1984 (age 41); Talisay, Camarines Norte, Philippines
- Occupations: Actor; comedian; model
- Years active: 2004–present
- Agent: Star Magic
- Height: 170 cm (5 ft 7 in)
- Spouse: Kathy Kimberly Saga (m. 2014)
- Children: 2

John Ross Sanchez "Joross" Gamboa (born November 28, 1984), is a Filipino actor, comedian and model who was a 2nd runner-up in the 1st season of Star Circle Quest.

== Early life and education ==
Gamboa is born on November 28, 1984, to Natio Gamboa, a Custom examiner and Monet Gamboa, a realtor. He has two younger siblings: Jvix Gamboa and Jillian Gamboa.

He went to De La Salle–College of Saint Benilde and took up computer science but unable to finish his degree due to his acting career. In 2014, Gamboa returned to school; studied nursing but shifted and graduated with Bachelor of Arts in Mass Communication at Southville International School and Colleges.

In 2025, Gamboa graduated with a bachelor's degree in biblical studies from the divinity school of Colorado-based Global Life University in Pasig. He is a practising Evangelical Christian.

== Career ==
After four years of being with ABS-CBN Star Magic, Joross Gamboa is asked to be released and signed a two-year contract under the management of Becky Aguila. He was seen in the comedy segment Kaya Mo Ba To? in 2005 followed by Maynila in 2007, both aired on GMA Network, which became the reason for rumors of Joross Gamboa moving to the said Network. After signing a contract with Becky Aguila, he will stay with ABS-CBN as his new talent manager still has issues with GMA Network.

Ending the contract of Joross Gamboa with Becky Aguila, he is now under the management of Noel Ferrer since late 2009. Noel Ferrer also manages other famous actors like Bayani Agbayani and Ryan Agoncillo who are both with TV5. Currently a freelance artist, since he left his former Kapamilya network ABS-CBN, he is now open working with all networks.

Right after doing a movie with Star Cinema last October 2010 My Amnesia Girl, Joross Gamboa was back December 2010, on ABS-CBN as the antagonist in the Kristine Series: The Second Book in December playing antagonist to Bangs Garcia's character and Zanjoe Marudo's character Bernard in the Hit Primetime Television Drama.

After doing shows for ABS-CBN and TV5, and after winning best supporting actor for Intoy Syokoy ng Kalye Marino in Cinemalaya last year, he is now back doing movies with Star Cinema.

In 2016, Gamboa transferred from ABS-CBN to its rival network GMA Network. In 2017, he is now a freelance artist and he appeared as a supporting cast in ABS-CBN's La Luna Sangre and guest role in FPJ's Ang Probinsyano.

Gamboa is part of the top four highest-grossing Filipino films of all time, namely Hello, Love, Again, Rewind, Hello, Love, Goodbye and The Hows of Us.

== Business ==
Gamboa has a family owned resort, Mexitali Resort, a Mexican-themed resort located in Nasugbu, Batangas.

== Personal life ==
Gamboa wed Kathy Kimberly "Katz" Saga on November 29, 2014, in Alabang. Together, they have two sons: Jace Kyler, and John Kody.

== Filmography ==
=== Film ===
Year	Title	Role
2005	Can This Be Love	Jed
2005	D' Anothers	Xavier
2008	A Very Special Love	John Rae
2008	One Night Only	Nestor
2009	You Changed My Life	John Rae
2010	My Amnesia Girl	Jan
2011	Babang Luksa	Don Don
2012	Every Breath U Take	Jack
2012	Intoy Syokoy ng Kalye Marino	Bertong Baka
2012	Suddenly It's Magic	Sam
2013	The Fighting Chefs	Master Chef's Group
2013	It Takes A Man And A Woman	John Rae
2014	Starting Over Again	Ali
2014	Dilim	Danny
2015	I Love You. Thank You	Paul
2016	Pare, Mahal Mo Raw Ako	
2017	My Ex and Why's	Mustang
2017	Can't Help Falling in Love	Nilo/Alpen Rose
2017	Deadma Walking	John "Dying Diva" Samson/Yolly Redgrave
2018	Ang Dalawang Mrs. Reyes	Gary Reyes
2018	Three Words to Forever	Paeng
2018	BuyBust	Manok
2018	The Hows of Us	Buyer
2019	Allergy in Love	
2019	Hello, Love, Goodbye	Jhim Gabriel
2019	The Panti Sisters	Zernan
2019	'Tol	Dimitri
2020	Mang Kepweng: Ang Lihim ng Bandanang Itim	Maximus Tolonges
2022	Labyu with an Accent	Dave
2023	Rewind	Lucas
2024	Hello, Love, Again	Jhim Gabriel
2025	Quezon	Eduardo Rusca
2026	Tayo sa Wakas	JC

=== Television ===
Year	Title	Role
2004	Star Circle Quest	Questort
2004	SCQ Reload: OK Ako!	Joross
2004–2005	MTB Ang Saya Saya	Host
2005–2007	At Home Ka Dito	Host
2005	M.R.S.	Host
2005	SCQ Reload: Kilig Ako!	Joross
2005	Kaya Mo Ba To?	Dan
2006	Gulong ng Palad	Totoy Santos
2006	Komiks Presents: Cleopakwak	Tonyo
2006	Rounin	Thalon
2006	Star Magic Presents: 3 Minutes	Melvin
2007	Love Spell Presents: Line To Heaven	Raffy
2007	Maalaala Mo Kaya: Cellfone	Yvon
2007	Sineserye Presents: Natutulog Ba ang Diyos?	Mark Vilchez
2007	Maynila	Anton
2008	Ligaw na Bulaklak	Ricky
2008	Komiks Presents: Tiny Tony	Bryan / Red
2008	Komiks Presents: Dragonna	Migo
2008	Eva Fonda	Andoy
2008	Abt Ur Luv: Ur Lyf 2	
2009	Your Song Presents: Without You	Bobby
2009	Maalaala Mo Kaya: Bisekleta	Roque
2009	May Bukas Pa	Peter
2009	Your Song Presents: Babalik Kang Muli	Ricky
2010	SOP Fully Charged	Performer / Host
2010	First Time	Coach Ted
2010	SRO Cinemaserye: Meet The Fathers	Brent
2010	Tisay	Adrian
2010	Precious Hearts Romances Presents: Kristine	Charlie
2011	Babaeng Hampaslupa	Phillip Cheng
2011	Sa Ngalan ng Ina	Ramoncito Concepcion
2012	Precious Hearts Romances Presents: Hiyas	Evan
2012	Kung Ako'y Iiwan Mo	Edward Santiago
2013	Toda Max	Martin
2013	My Little Juan	Jorge
2013	Wanspanataym: Tago, Diego, Tago	Mystiko Magikero
2013	Undercover	Jimboy
2013	Genesis	Leandro Manastalas
2014	Home Sweetie Home	Glenn Dela Torre
2014	Maalaala Mo Kaya: Pagkain	Pablo
2014	Beki Boxer	Madonna
2015	Kapamilya, Deal or No Deal	Contestant Lucky Stars Batch 2
2015	Bridges of Love	Buboy
2015	My Fair Lady	Arthur
2016	Juan Happy Love Story	Bob Agoncillo
2016	CelebriTV	Himself
2016	Dear Uge: 'Till Death Do Us Part	Travis
2016	Karelasyon: Raketera	Anton
2016	Sunday PinaSaya	Lingcod
2016	Karelasyon: Kabit-kabit	Rannel
2016	Alyas Robin Hood	Jojo / Mentalist / Street Magician
2016	Superstar Duets	Himself / Contestant
2016	Magpakailanman: Davao Bombing" Mga kuwento ng pag-asa Part 1 / 2	Victor
2016	Dear Uge: Military Mommy	Jonas
2017	Full House Tonight	Himself / Co-host / Performer
2017	Encantadia	Manik
2017	La Luna Sangre	Baristo Elizeo†
2017	Pepito Manaloto: Ang Tunay na Kuwento	Mario
2018–2019	FPJ's Ang Probinsyano	Tanggol
2018	Maalaala Mo Kaya: Alkansiya	Hercules
2018	Ipaglaban Mo!: Hukay	Jordan
2019	Maalaala Mo Kaya: Rattle	June
2020	24/7	Emerson Agbayani
2020	Fluid	Jacob
2020	Paano Kita Mapasasalamatan?	Edward Nonay
2020	Bangon Talentadong Pinoy	Himself / Talent scout
2021–2022	Hoy, Love You!	Jules
2022	My Papa Pi	Boy Tinga
2022	Flower of Evil	Rico Gallardo
2023	The Missing Husband	Brendan Salazar
2024	Tadhana: Pinaasa	Chito / Roel
2024	Barangay Singko Panalo	Host
2025	Sanggang-Dikit FR	Eric Garcia
2025	Pepito Manaloto: Tuloy ang Kuwento	Mario
2026	Code Gray (GMA–7)	TBA

== Awards and nominations ==
Year	Award giving body	Category	Nominated work	Results
2005	19th PMPC Star Awards for TV	Best New Male TV Personality	SCQ Reload	Won
2009	23rd PMPC Star Awards for TV	Best Single Performance by an Actor	Maalaala Mo Kaya: Bisikleta	Won
2012	8th Cinemalaya Independent Film Festival	Best Supporting Actor	Intoy Syokoy ng Kalye Marino	Won
2013	37th Gawad Urian Awards	Best Supporting Actor	Intoy Syokoy ng Kalye Marino	Nominated
2017	43rd Metro Manila Film Festival	Best Actor	Deadma Walking	Nominated
