= DM Sevilla =

Filipino actor and dancer

- Born: Denmark Sevilla; January 29, 1987 (age 38); Santa Maria, Bulacan, Philippines
- Other names: DM, Romeo
- Occupation(s): Actor, Model
- Years active: 2004-present
- Agent: Star Magic (2004-present)
- Height: 5 ft 8 in (173 cm)

Denmark Sevilla popularly known as DM Sevilla (born 29 January 1987) is a Filipino actor and dancer.

Sevilla was born in Santa Maria, Bulacan, Philippines. He is one of the final top 5 members of Star Circle Quest batch 2004 together with Erich Gonzales. He is currently working on ABS-CBN and best known for his role as Romeo in Princess and I.

== Filmography ==
=== Television ===
Year	Title	Role	Notes
2004	Star Circle Quest	Himself/Runner-Up	Contestant (2004–2005)
2004	SCQ Reload: OK Ako!	Himself	
2005	Ikaw ang Lahat sa Akin	Hazel's Suitor	(in a full trailer)
2006	Maalaala Mo Kaya: Switcher	Himself	
2007	The Sign	Bugoy	1st-movie appearance
2010	Maalaala Mo Kaya: Pinwheel	Wowie	
2011	Maalaala Mo Kaya: Baunan	Justin	
2011	Mula sa Puso	Peter	Supporting Role
2012	Maalaala Mo Kaya: Kwintas	Redentor	
2012	Walang Hanggan	Himself	One of the 18 Rose & also he appeared in Daniel & Katarina's Wedding- (uncredited)
2012	Mundo Man ay Magunaw	Mike's Friend	(uncredited)
2012	Princess and I	Romeo	Supporting Role
2012	Maalaala Mo Kaya: Upuan		

=== Others ===
- Eat Bulaga! - as Mr. Pogi Grand finalist [2004]
- ASAP Fanatics - as himself/co-host [2004-05]
- TEENS - as a host [2007-08]
