= Michelle Madrigal =

Filipino-American actress (born 1988)

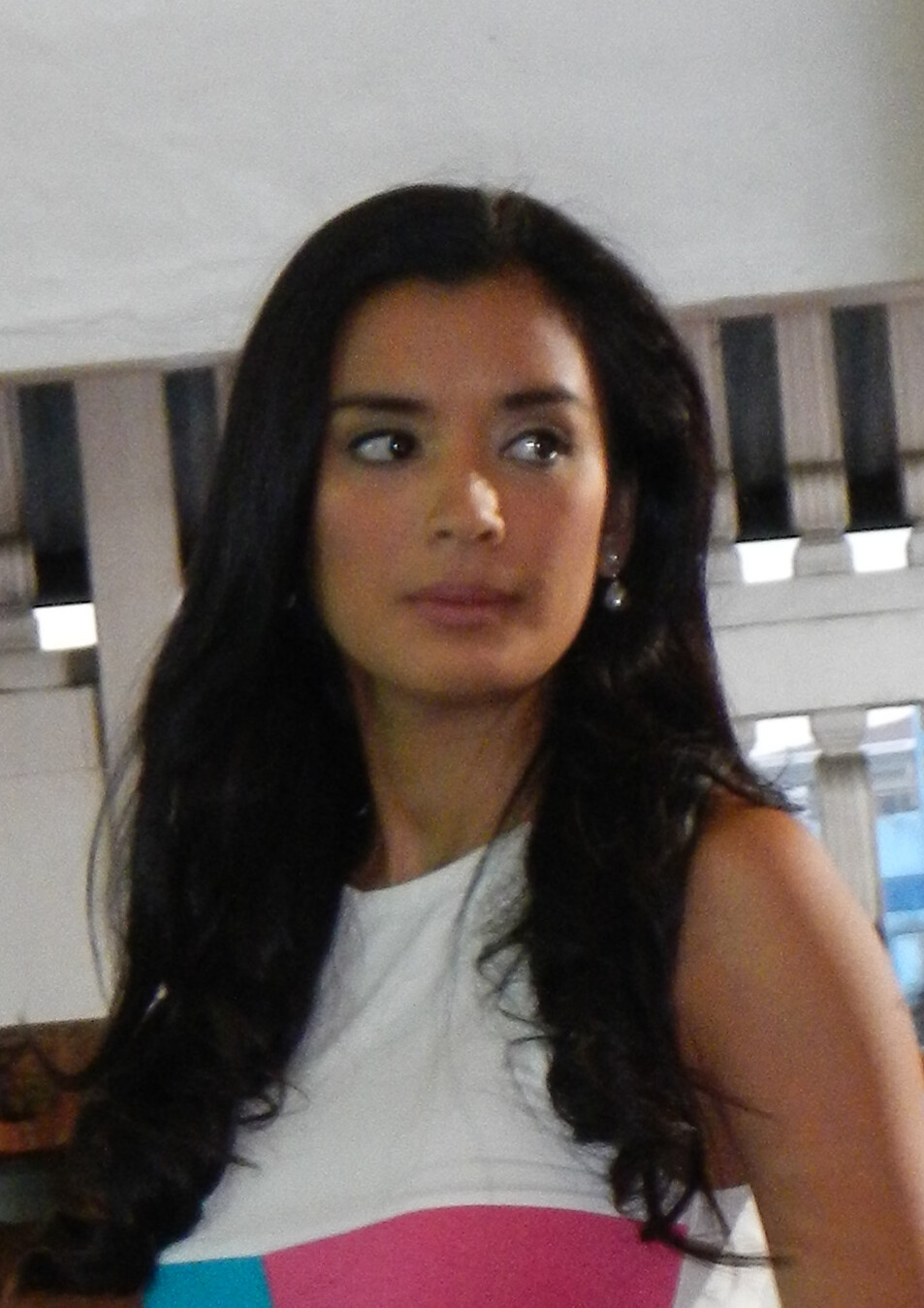
- Born: Michelle Madrigal Gaspar; November 4, 1988 (age 38); Quezon City, Philippines
- Occupation: Actress
- Years active: 2004–2018
- Agents: Star Magic (2004–2006; 2015–2018) GMA Artist Center (2007–2015); Viva Artist Agency (2015–2016)
- Height: 1.66 m (5 ft 5 in)
- Spouses: Troy Woolfolk (m. 2019; div. 2022); Kevin Neal (m. 2024)
- Website: http://www.igma.tv/profile/michelle-madrigal

Michelle Madrigal Gaspar (born November 4, 1988) is a Filipino-American former actress. She was a finalist of ABS-CBN reality talent search, Star Circle Quest. She has a younger sister named Micaella Madrigal and her elder sister, Ehra Madrigal is also an actress.

== Career ==
She was a former contract star at ABS-CBN's Star Magic, where she started when she joined the reality talent search Star Circle Quest in 2004. Thereafter, she was cast in several TV shows in the network, particularly in the youth-oriented drama SCQ Reload and the fantasy horror series Spirits along with Vietnam Rose, Crazy for You, Maging Sino Ka Man and Sineserye Presents: May Minamahal.

In 2007, Annabelle Rama took her under her wing as her manager. She transferred to GMA Network along with her older sister Ehra Madrigal. Michelle and Ehra were both cover girls of FHM for the same month of September but in different years. She was one of the casts of the two fantasy drama series Kamandag and Dyesebel, via GMA Network, in where she played a villainess. Recently, she is included in the cast of Luna Mystika as one of the fairies (other being Pauleen Luna).

In 2009, Madrigal played Juana Manalo in Zorro and she included in Sine Novela: Tinik sa Dibdib which stars Sunshine Dizon (later Nadine Samonte) as Lorna Yadao-Domingo, where she played the only crazy but humble sister in law of Trixie (Ara Mina, later Rita (Sheryl Cruz) Moret or Corazon Domingo.

In 2015, Madrigal returned to ABS-CBN and appeared in Pasión de Amor (based on Pasión de Gavilanes, produced by Telemundo), co-starring Jake Cuenca, Arci Muñoz, Ejay Falcon, Ellen Adarna, Joseph Marco and Coleen Garcia. Michelle and her sister Ehra are now talents of Viva Artist Agency since 2015, while in 2016 the supporting roles with Rodessa in the TV series Born for You, and the supporting and last appearances as SPO3 Sunshine Monteloyola in Ang Probinsyano.

== Personal life ==
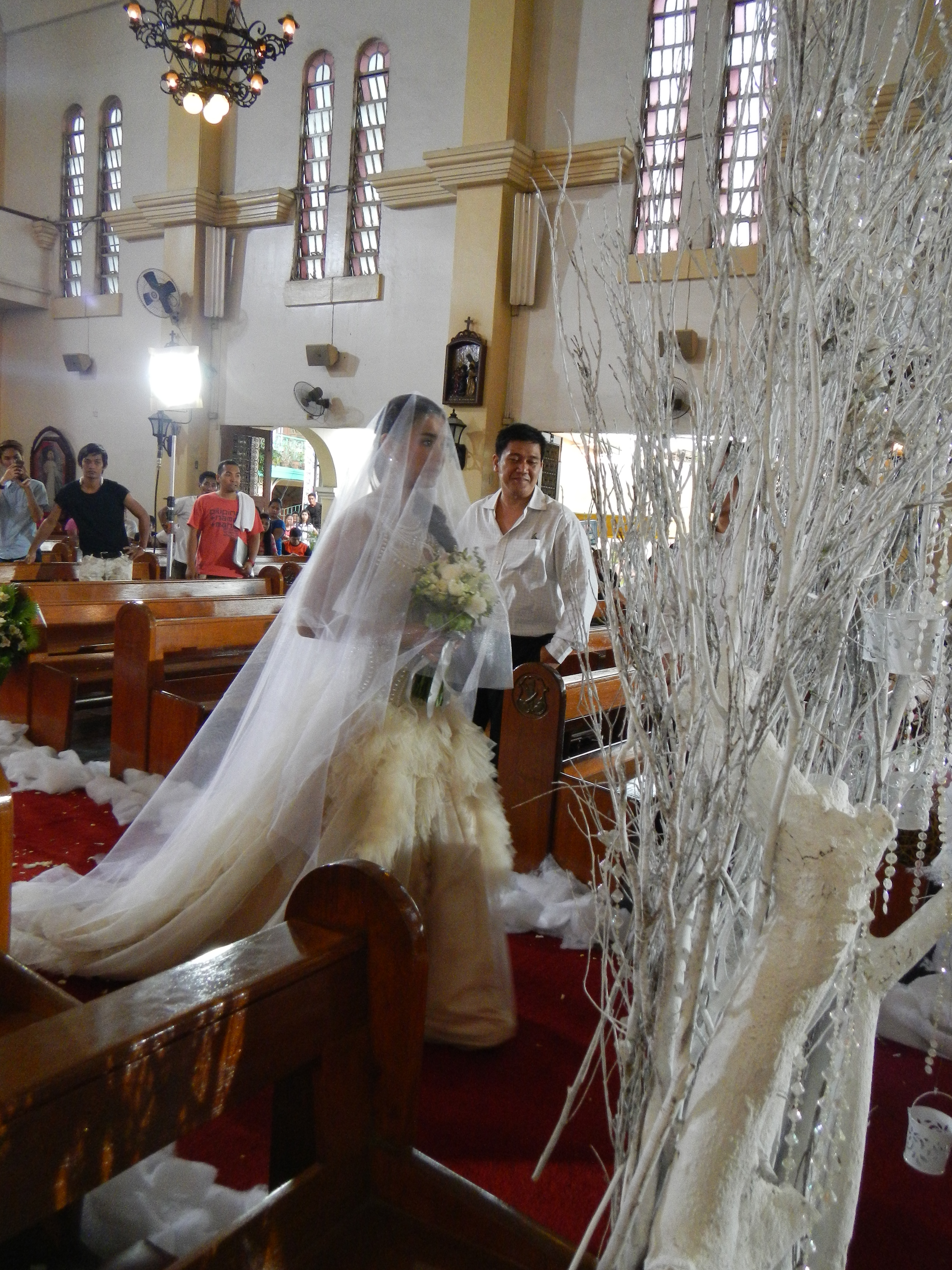
Chantal Armada (Temptation of Wife at Santuario de San Pedro Bautista).

On April 30, 2017, Madrigal announced through Instagram that she and her partner, Troy Woolfolk, had been expecting their first child for three months. She gave birth to Anika Austin on October 20, 2017, whom they are coparenting. In July 2017, Madrigal announced that she and Woolfolk became engaged. In August 2021, Michelle and her husband confirmed that they separated as they go through their divorce by posting on their respective Instagram accounts.

On February 12, 2022, Michelle confirmed that she took the oath to be a naturalized American citizen.

In May 2024, she introduced her new partner Kevin Neal. They were married on July 22, 2024 at Travis County Courthouse.

In July 2024, Madrigal announced the motor vehicle theft of her white Acura MDX with vehicle registration plate SJL6243 along North Tustin, Round Rock, Hutto, Manor, or Taylor area.

== Filmography ==
=== Film ===
Year	Title	Role
2005	D' Anothers	Mayumi
2006	I Wanna Be Happy	
2006	Mano Po 5: Gua Ai Di	Kate
2007	One More Chance	
2007	Resiklo	Dr. Miles
2008	My Big Love	Lyn
2008	My Monster Mom	Maureen
2011	My Valentine Girls	Female North Korean Soldier

=== Television ===
Year	Title	Role
2004	SCQ Reload: OK Ako!	Michelle "Mitch" Revilla
2004	Spirits	Maya
2005	SCQ Reload: Kilig Ako!	Michelle "Mitch" Revilla
2005–2006	Vietnam Rose	Faith Dela Cerna
2006	Crazy for You	Sabrina
2006–2007	Maging Sino Ka Man	Yvette Ramos
2007	Sineserye Presents: May Minamahal	Mandy Tagle
2007–2008	Carlo J. Caparas' Kamandag	Eliza
2008	Mars Ravelo's Dyesebel	Berbola
2008–2009	Luna Mystika	Anata
2009	Zorro	Juana Manalo / Caballera
2009–2010	Sine Novela: Tinik sa Dibdib	Moret / Corazon Domingo
2010	First Time	Valeria Gomez
2011	Mars Ravelo's Captain Barbell: Ang Pagbabalik	Anita / Cyclone
2011–2012	Kung Aagawin Mo ang Langit	Bridgitte Samonte
2012	Faithfully	Luchie Trajano
2012–2013	Temptation of Wife	Chantal Armada
2013	Love and Lies	Catherine "Cathy" Alcantara-Galvez
2013–2014	Adarna	Garuda
2015–2016	Pasión de Amor	Lucia "Cia" Espejo
2016	Born for You	Rodessa
