= Joseph Bitangcol =

Filipino television and film actor

- Born: March 28, 1984 (age 42); Pampanga, Philippines
- Occupation: Actor
- Years active: 2004–2022
- Agents: Star Magic; GMA Artist Center
- Spouse: Franchesca Tonson (m. 2016)

Joseph Bitangcol (born March 28, 1984) is a Filipino television and film actor. He is one of the first batch of the reality talent search Star Circle Quest on ABS-CBN.

== Career ==
He started when he joined the reality talent search of ABS-CBN which is Star Circle Quest in 2004. He made it to the Top 10 or "Magic Circle of 10", but he did not make it to the final 5, or "Magic Circle of 5".

After the contest, he became part of ABS-CBN's Star Magic. He starred in the youth oriented program SCQ Reload with co-former questors and in horror-fantasy series Spirits which was directed by Chito S. Roño. In 2006, he did his first movie with Star Cinema, entitled D' Lucky Ones, paired with Sandara Park.

=== Career on GMA Network ===
After his contract with ABS-CBN expired, he decided to leave his home grown network and sign another exclusive contract on its rival station GMA Network under GMA Artist Center (now Sparkle GMA Artist Center. There he portrayed a role in drama series Babangon Ako't Dudurugin Kita. He also had a special participation in Yasmien Kurdi's TV drama titled Saan Darating ang Umaga?, on the same network. He is part of the new indie film with Polo Ravales titled Walang Kawala produces by D.M.B Entertainment Inc..

=== Back to ABS-CBN ===
In 2009, he returned to his home-grown network ABS-CBN and first appeared in May Bukas Pa following the fantasy series Agimat: Ang Mga Alamat ni Ramon Revilla: Tiagong Akyat co-star Gerald Anderson. He recently guested in Eat Bulaga!, a noontime show aired on GMA Network. He also voiced Prince Zardoz in the redubbed version of Voltes 5, known as Voltes 5: Evolution.

== Personal life ==
He tied the knot with his non-showbiz girlfriend Franchesca Tonson at Sweet Harmony Gardens, Taytay, Rizal on July 30, 2016. The two have been in a relationship since December 13, 2014. Since then, Joseph and Franchesca have been open about their love for each other on their respective Instagram accounts. Franchesca is currently a nursing student in University of The Philippines.

== Filmography ==
=== Film ===
Year	Title	Role
2006	D' Lucky Ones	Lucky Boy / Luis
2006	Shake, Rattle and Roll VIII	Gino
2008	Walang Kawala (No Way Out)	Waldo

=== Television ===
Year	Title	Role
2004	Star Circle Quest	Himself
2004	SCQ Reload: OK Ako!	Seph
2004	Maalaala Mo Kaya	Himself
2004	ASAP Fanatic	Himself/Performer
2004–present	ASAP	Himself/Host/Performer
2005	SCQ Reload: Kilg Ako!	Seph
2005	Vietnam Rose	Joven Custodio
2006	Crazy for You	Jomar
2007	Komiks Presents: Da Adventures of Pedro Penduko	Father - a priest in San Luis
2007	Margarita	Robbie
2007	Maynila	Elton
2007	Boys Nxt Door	King
2008	Babangon Ako't Dudurugin Kita	Tyrone San Juan
2008	Saan Darating ang Umaga?	Mark
2008	Luna Mystika	Aldred
2009	Totoy Bato	Heather's Doctor
2009	Maynila	Mike
2009	May Bukas Pa	Bryan
2009	Agimat: Ang Mga Alamat ni Ramon Revilla: Tiagong Akyat	Pablo Reyes
2009	Nagsimula sa Puso	Eugene
2010	Eat Bulaga!	Himself/Guest
2010	Star Confessions	Himself
2011	Babaeng Hampaslupa	Adrian
2011	Lokomoko	Himself
2012	Maalaala Mo Kaya: Bangkang Papel	Special Guest
2013	Maalaala Mo Kaya: Saranggola	Jesus
2014	Yagit	Tonyo
2015	Maalaala Mo Kaya: E-Mail	
2016–2017	FPJ's Ang Probinsyano	JO3 Cristobal Mendoza
2019	The General's Daughter	Young Marcial
2022	Tadhana	Marco
