= Hero Angeles =

Filipino actor (born 1984)

- Born: Hero Gervacio Angeles; December 8, 1984 (age 41); Marikina, Philippines
- Occupation: Actor
- Years active: 2004–present
- Agents: Star Magic (2004–2005; 2015–present); GMA Artist Center (2006–2009)

Hero Gervacio Angeles (born December 8, 1984) is a Filipino actor. Hero Angeles bested four other contestants in the Grand Finals for the title "Grand Teen Questor" in the first season of ABS-CBN's popular reality star search in the Philippines, Star Circle Quest.

== Career ==
Angeles was a student of University of the Philippines Diliman, College of Fine Arts. After winning the title of the first “Grand Teen Questor” of ABS-CBN's Star Circle Quest, he appeared in several shows on the network like the youth-oriented program SCQ Reload, and the fantasy series Krystala starring Judy Ann Santos. One of the hottest young stars in 2004, his loveteam with Sandara Park was popular, making box-office hits like Bcuz Of U and Can This Be Love.

In 2005, Angeles ended his contract with ABS-CBN Corporation's Star Magic, and later appeared in various TV shows on rival network, GMA-7. Until March 2008, Angeles was a contractual talent with GMA Network under managers German Moreno and brother Henry Angeles. His first break there was playing Mark in Dyesebel starring Marian Rivera and Dingdong Dantes. After Dyesebel, he played a main antagonist in Luna Mystika, which starred fellow former Kapamilya stars Heart Evangelista and Mark Anthony Fernandez.

Angeles also made his directorial debut in 2007 entitled Stockroom, blending modern horror with social issues on employment of language teachers in the Philippines. It was sold out at the Cinemalaya Philippine Independent Film Festival. The film also had its world premiere at the Saint James Cavalier Theatre in Valletta, Malta in November 2007. After joining Luna Mystika Angeles joined the first Sine Novela of Jennylyn Mercado and Mark Herras entitled Sine Novela: Paano Ba ang Mangarap?

Beginning 2006, Angeles was a regular co-presenter with Moreno on the Saturday late night show Walang Tulugan with the Master Showman, shown through GMA Network and GMA Pinoy TV. When the Philippine adaptation of Endless Love was in production, he was considered for the role of Andrew but was passed over for Dennis Trillo. It was also rumored in June 2011 that he was to play the titular Captain Barbell, but the role ultimately went to Richard Gutierrez.

Angeles is now endorsing Philippine tourism fashion social enterprise Favola Shirts, a project of the Pag-asa Social Center Foundation, Inc. based in Tagaytay. The shirts are produced by the city's out-of-school youth, with Angeles contributing some of his own designs to the project.

On December 1, 2014, Angeles launched his first Online Art Gallery, ARTCETERO. As an artist on different media, he aimed to share his talent through the page to help inspire others, with 50% of proceeds from sales of his art going to charities like iCancerVive and “From the bottom of My heART”.

In 2018, Angeles returned to ABS-CBN with the drama series Halik as the gay Atty. Ken Velasco.

== Visual arts ==
=== Solo exhibit ===
Year	Date	Title	Venue
2015	Feb 9-13	Inkterlace: A Hero Angeles Interlacing Ink Art Exhibit	CASSalida Theater, MSU - IIT, Iligan City, Lanao Del Norte Mindanao

== Filmography ==
=== Film ===
Year	Title	Role
2004	Volta	Himself
2004	Bcuz of U	Louie
2005	Can This Be Love	Ryan
2007	Stockroom	Samio / Director / Producer / Writer
2009	Sundo	Eric
2013	The Fighting Chefs	Chef Ivan
2019	I Will: Doc Willie Ong Movie	Doc Willie Ong

=== Television ===
Year	Title	Role
2001	Sa Dulo ng Walang Hanggan	Visitor
2004	Pacific Concrete Products Inc. Warehouse	Warehouse master #3 / Himself
2004	SCQ Reload: OK Ako!	Hero Roxas
2004–2005; 2015	ASAP	Himself / Performer
2004	Krystala	Loverboy / Mysterio
2005	SCQ Reload: Kilig Ako!	Hero Sanchez
2006	Extra Challenge	Himself / Challenger
2006	Walang Tulugan with the Master Showman	Co-host
2007	Maynila: Tug of Hearts	Mike
2008	Maynila: Prince Charming	Alex
2008	Dyesebel	Mark
2008–2009	Luna Mystika	Alguwas
2009	Sine Novela: Paano Ba Ang Mangarap?	Benny / Benjamin Valderama (Special Guest Role)
2009	Dear Friend: Karibal	Junby
2012	Showbiz Inside Report	Himself
2015	Kapamilya Deal or No Deal	Himself / Number 9
2015	Nathaniel	Israel Marasigan
2015	Ipaglaban Mo: Sumpa Ng Pagnanasa	Romeo
2016	Family Feud	Himself
2016	Maalaala Mo Kaya: Silver Medal	Gerwin Diaz
2016	Maalaala Mo Kaya: Rehas Railing	Carlo Romano
2017	Maalaala Mo Kaya: Salon	Pia
2017	Tadhana: Sundo	Dexter
2017–2018	FPJ's Ang Probinsyano	SPO2 Mark Capellan
2017	Ipaglaban Mo: Banggaan	Miguel
2017	Maalaala Mo Kaya: Kidney	Joel
2018	Maalaala Mo Kaya: Barya	Idel
2018–2019	Halik	Atty. Kenneth “Ken” Velasco
2019	SMAC Pinoy Ito!	Himself/Guest
2019	Ipaglaban Mo: Palaban	Ray
2020	Maalaala Mo Kaya: Stethoscope	Elijah Bactol
2020	Maalaala Mo Kaya: Bracelet	Elijah Bactol
2022	Maalaala Mo Kaya: Altar	Michael Villadarez
2023	Can't Buy Me Love	young Wilson
2025	What Lies Beneath	Lemuel Soria

== Awards ==
Year	Film Award/Critics	Award	Work	Result
2004		Grand Teen Questor	Star Circle Quest	Won
2006	Golden Screen Awards	Best Performance by an Actor in a Leading Role (Musical or Comedy)	Can This Be Love	Nominated
