= Star Circle Quest =

2004–11 Philippine television reality show

- Genre: Talent show
- Presented by: Luis Manzano (2004–06); Jodi Sta. Maria (2004–05); Anne Curtis (2006); Ruffa Gutierrez (2009); Ai-Ai Delas Alas (2009); KC Concepcion (2010–11)
- Judges: Teen Quest Jury: Boy Abunda (2004–05); Gloria Diaz (2004–05); Laurenti Dyogi (2004–05); Kid Quest Jury: Eula Valdez (2004-06); Maricel Laxa (2004); Joyce Bernal (2006); Ricky Davao (2006); Rowell Santiago (2004, 2010–11); Vina Morales (2010–11); Gladys Reyes (2010-11)
- Country of origin: Philippines
- Original language: Filipino

Production
- Running time: 30-60 minutes

Original release
- Network: ABS-CBN
- Release: March 1, 2004 – February 19, 2011

Related
- SCQ Reload

Star Circle Quest (SCQ) is a Philippine television reality competition show broadcast by ABS-CBN. Originally hosted by Luis Manzano and Jodi Sta. Maria, it aired on the network's Primetime Bida and Yes Weekend! line up from March 1, 2004 to February 19, 2011, replacing Next Level Na! Game Ka Na Ba? and was replaced by the second season of Pilipinas Got Talent. KC Concepcion served as the final host.

The theme song was sung by Star in a Million finalists Sheryn Regis and Marinel Santos.

== Overview ==
In 1992, Mr. Johnny Manahan and Freddie M. Garcia formed ABS-CBN Talent Center, now known as Star Magic to hone individuals as exclusive talents of the network. Manahan then introduced Star Circle, an untelevised talent search which aims to look for fresh faces to be the next idol. 12 years later, after having 12 batches and more than 120 members, Star Circle was brought to Philippine TV as a reality talent search. Auditions for the first season were held between October 2003 and January 2004. Before the said competition was aired, ABS-CBN aired the celebration of Star Circle as well as the launch of Star Circle Quest on February 27, 2004, presenting the Top 200 kid & teen aspirants who passed the screenings. The show premiered on March 1, 2004, on primetime.

Star Circle Quest has aired 2 seasons for teens and 4 seasons for kids. Aside from the Grand Questor, the show also awards the top 5 finalists of the season called Magic Circle of Five, with the exception of the last season, wherein it only awarded Grand Girl Kiddie Superstar and Grand Boy Kiddie Superstar.

== Hosts and jury ==
Traditionally, the show is presented with two hosts, while the jury is composed of three mentors.

=== Hosts ===
The hosts of Star Circle Quest

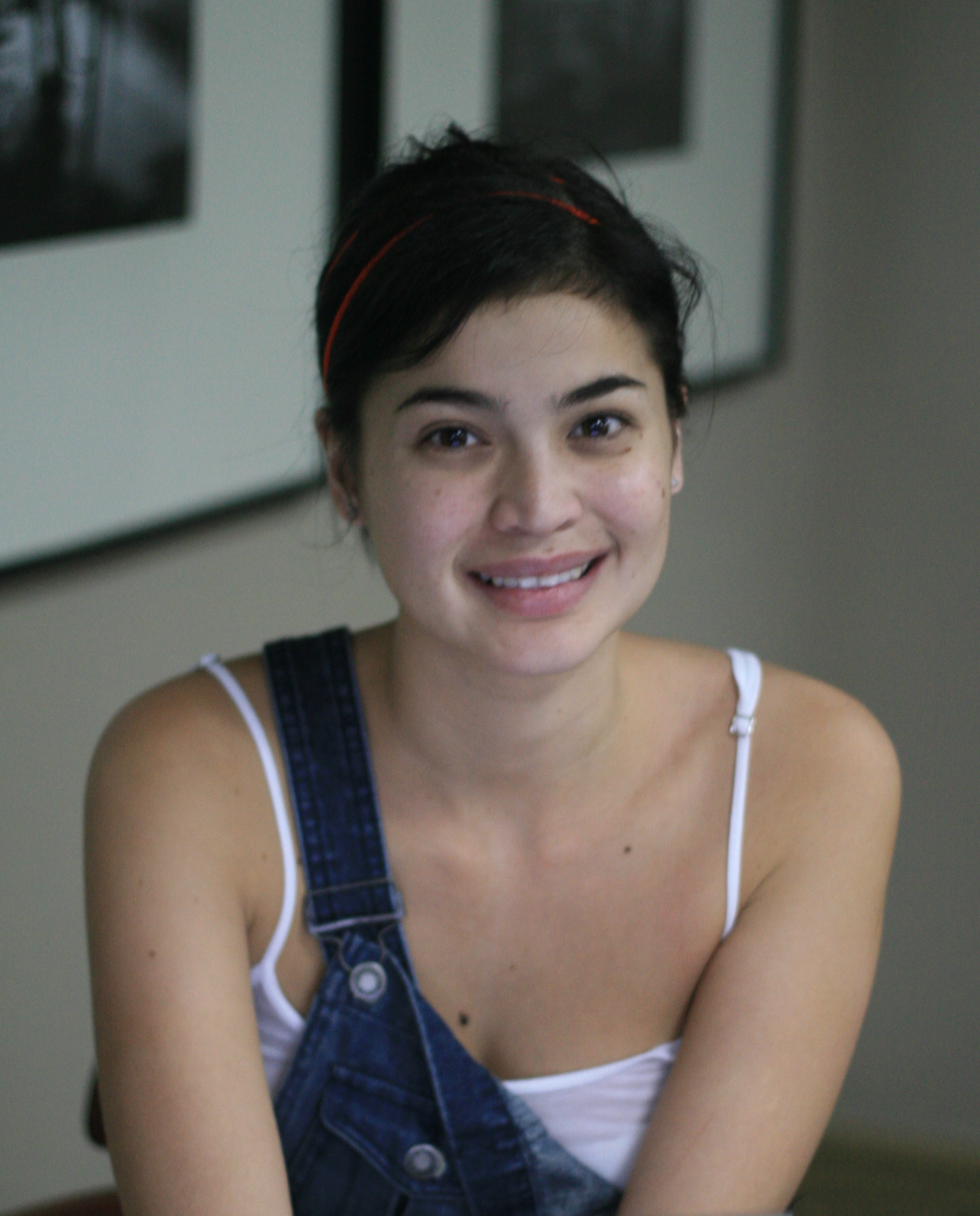
Anne Curtis (2006)

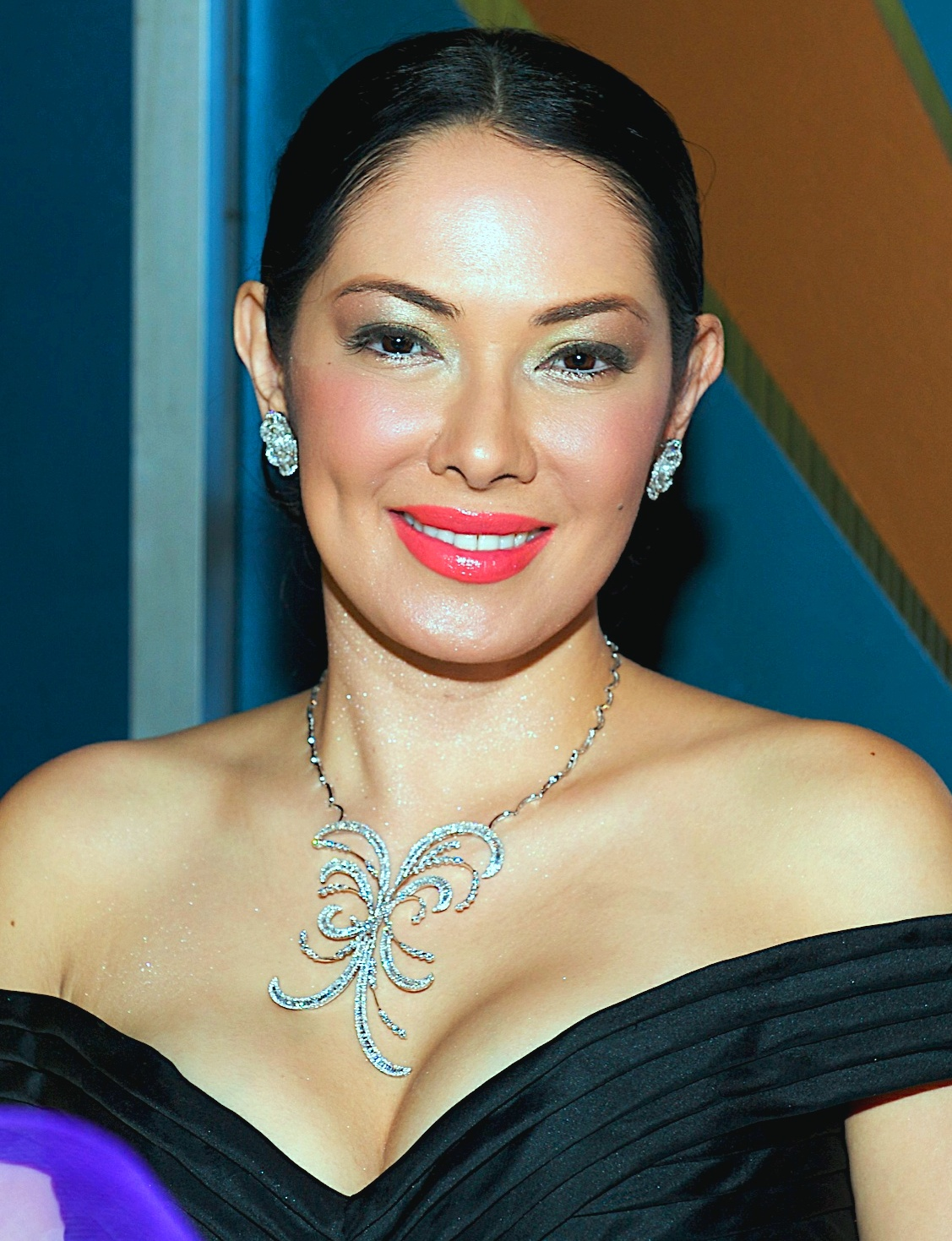
Ruffa Gutierrez (2009)

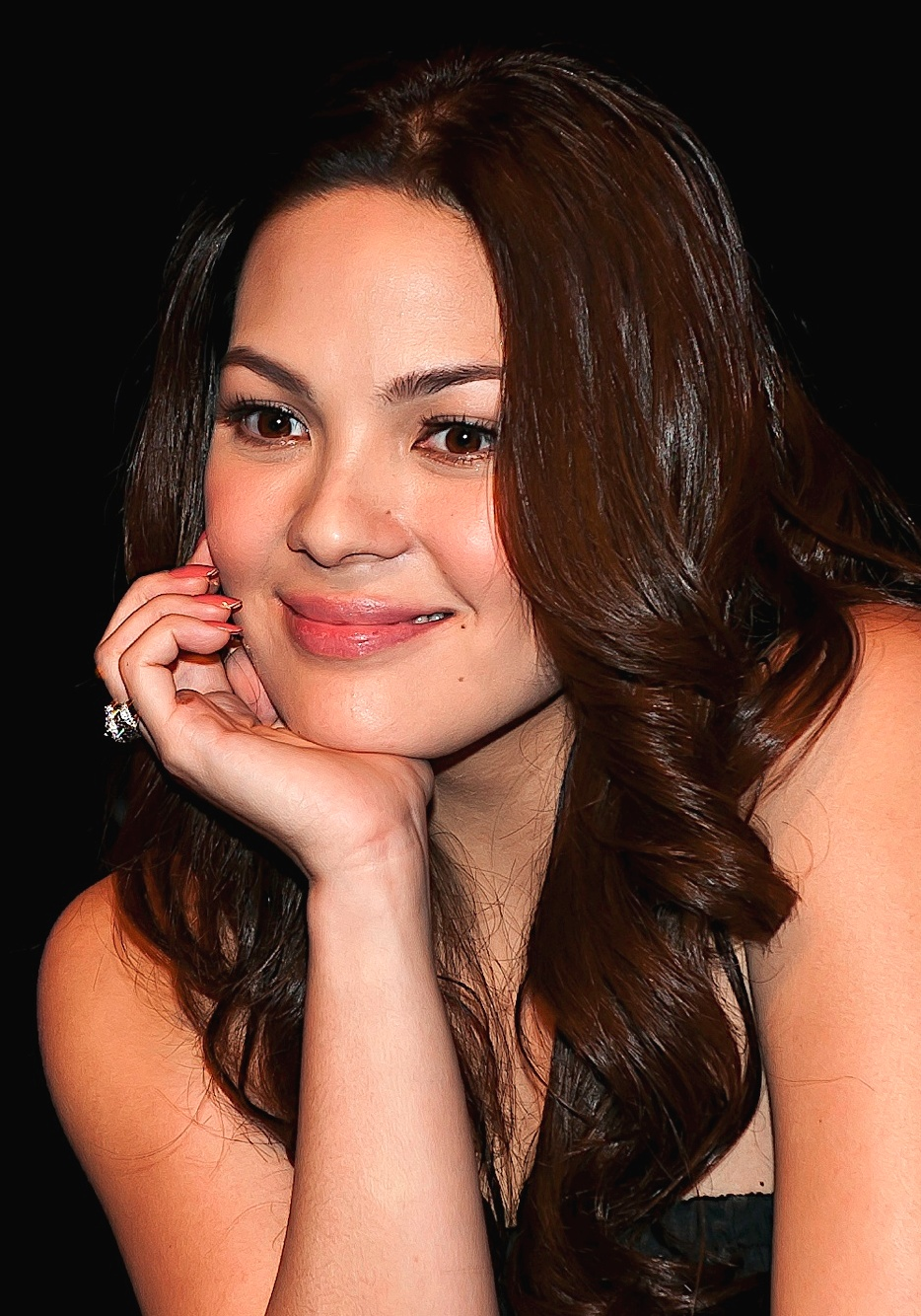
KC Concepcion (2010–11)

- Luis Manzano (2004–06)
- Jodi Sta. Maria (2004–05)
- Anne Curtis (2006)
- Ruffa Gutierrez (2009)
- Ai-Ai delas Alas (2009)
- KC Concepcion (2010–11)

=== Jury ===
The jury of Star Circle Quest

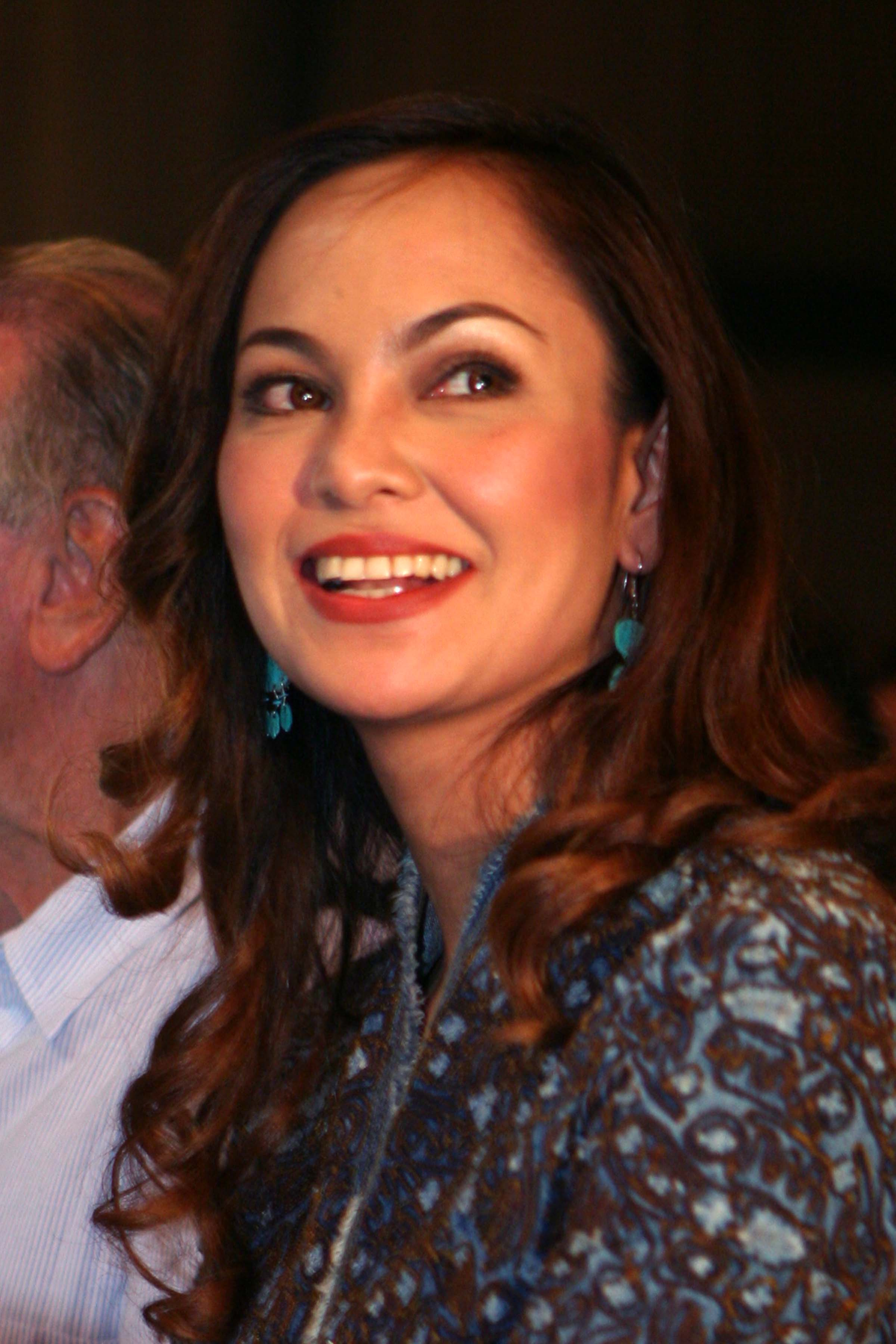
Eula Valdez (2004–06)

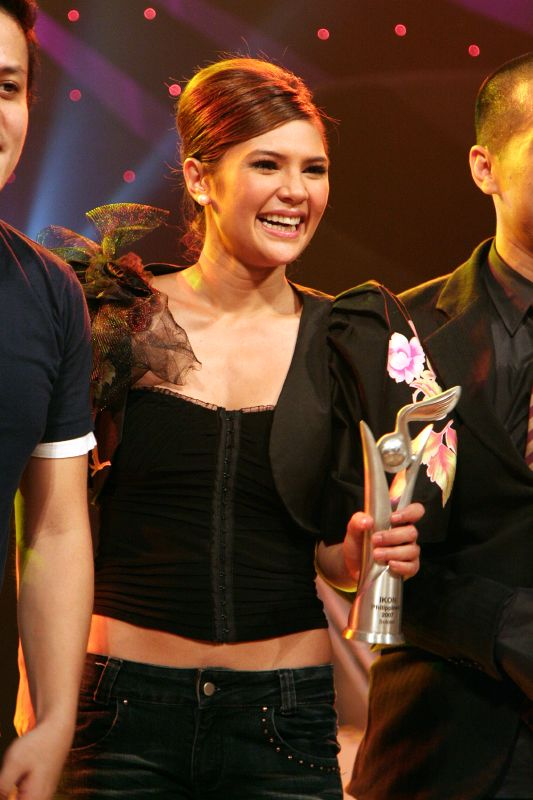
Vina Morales (2010–11)

==== Teen Quest Jury ====
- Boy Abunda (2004–05)
- Gloria Diaz (2004–05)
- Laurenti Dyogi (2004–05)

==== Kid Quest Jury ====
- Eula Valdez (2004–06)
- Maricel Laxa (2004)
- Joyce Bernal (2006)
- Ricky Davao (2006)
- Rowell Santiago (2004, 2010–11)
- Vina Morales (2010–11)
- Gladys Reyes (2010–11)

== Season overview ==
=== Star Circle Quest - Regular Edition ===
Season	Premiered	Ended	Title	Winner(s)	Runners-Up
1	March 1, 2004	June 5, 2004	Star Circle Quest	Hero Angeles	Sandara Park; Roxanne Guinoo; Joross Gamboa; Melissa Ricks
2	October 11, 2004	January 29, 2005	Star Circle National Teen Quest	Erich Gonzales	Arron Villaflor; Paw Diaz; Charles Christianson; DM Sevilla

=== Star Circle Quest - Kids Edition ===
Season	Premiered	Ended	Title	Winner(s)	Runners-Up
1	2004	June 5, 2004	Star Circle Kid Quest	Nash Aguas	Sharlene San Pedro; Aaron Junatas; Mikylla Ramirez; CJ Navato
2	March 2006	May 2006	Star Circle Summer Kid Quest	Quintin Alianza	Mika dela Cruz; Julio Pisk; Cheska Billiones; Darius Cardano
3	2009	2009	Star Circle Kid Quest: Search for the Kiddie Idol	Bugoy Cariño	Izzy Canillo; Eros Espiritu; Xyriel Manabat; Fatty Mendoza
4	December 4, 2010	February 19, 2011	Star Circle Quest for the Next Kiddie Superstars	Brenna Peñaflor; Clarence Delgado	Veyda Inoval; Kristoff Meneses; Maurice Mabutas; Jelo Echaluse

== Seasons ==
=== Star Circle Quest season 1 ===
The first season of Star Circle Quest titled Star Circle Teen Quest premiered on March 1, 2004, with Luis Manzano and Jodi Sta. Maria as the hosts. Entertainment personality Boy Abunda, TV director Laurenti Dyogi and former beauty queen Gloria Diaz completed the panel of judges called the "jury". The first season ended with a grand finals at the Araneta Coliseum on June 5, 2004, with Hero Angeles being hailed as the Grand Questor.

=== Star Circle Kid Quest (season 1) ===
The first season of Star Circle Kid Quest was launched the same day as the main edition. The show features kids from 5 to 9 years old. Manzano and Sta. Maria reprise their hosting duties, although the jury is now composed of award-winning actress Eula Valdez, veteran actress Maricel Laxa and TV director Rowell Santiago. The kids who made it to the Magic Circle of 10 were Nash Aguas, Sharlene San Pedro, Aaron Junatas, CJ Navato, Mikylla Ramirez, Jodell Stasic, Khaycee Aboloc, Alex Ramos, Basty Alcances and Celine Lim.

The Grand Questors Night for the Kid Quest was held at the Araneta Coliseum on June 5, 2004, around 5:30 PM, with the Star Circle Teen Quest's turn after. Nash Aguas became the Grand Questor, making Sharlene San Pedro as the second placer, while Aaron Junatas is in third place, Mikylla Ramirez in fourth and CJ Navato in fifth place.

=== Star Circle Quest (season 2) ===
ABS-CBN came up with a second season of Star Circle Teen Quest with the title Star Circle National Teen Quest after auditions were held nationwide and in some parts worldwide. Manzano and Sta. Maria continue to host the show, while the same jury guided the finalists throughout the program.

Thousands of teen aspirants auditioned but only 15 made it to the Final 15 or the "Magic Circle of 15", namely Erich Gonzales, Arron Villaflor, Paw Diaz, Charles Christianson, DM Sevilla, Janelle Quintana, Theo Bernados Michelle Arciaga, Jason Abalos, Bebs & KC Hollman, Reynan Pitero, OJ Decena, Vanessa Grindrund, Marla Boyd, Franz Ocampo.

==== Grand Questors Night ====
The Grand Questors Night was hosted at the PhilSports Arena.

Finally the Magic Circle of 5 showcased the numbers they have been rehearsing hard for. Each final questor showed their special talent that night which impressed the jurors as well as the thousands of audiences.

Erich Gonzales became the Grand Questor, Arron Villaflor was in the second, Paw Diaz in third, Charles Christianson in fourth, and DM Sevilla in fifth place.

=== 2006: Star Circle Summer Kid Quest (Season 2) ===
In 2006 the show made the second season of the kids edition. The show was called Summer Kid Quest because it was held in summer, between March–May.

Luis Manzano still hosts the show, however, Jodi Sta. Maria was replaced by Anne Curtis in hosting due to her pregnancy. Meanwhile, director Joyce Bernal and award-winning actor Ricky Davao joins Eula Valdez and replaces Rowell Santiago and Maricel Laxa.

==== Grand Questors Day ====
It was held at ABS-CBN Studio 1. It was called Grand Questors' Day because it was held during the afternoon instead of the usual primetime.

Quintin Alianza became the Grand Questor, Mika dela Cruz became the second placer, Julio Pisk is in the third place, Cheska Billiones in fourth and Darius Cardano in fifth place.

=== 2009: Star Circle Kid Quest: Search for the Kiddie Idol (Season 3) ===
The reality kid talent show was now transformed as a program segment of Ruffa & Ai every Wednesday with Ai-Ai delas Alas and Ruffa Gutierrez as main hosts. Bugoy Cariño became the Grand Questor, Izzy Canillo as the first runner-up, while Eros Espiritu finished in second place, Xyriel Manabat in third and Fatty Mendoza in fourth place.

=== 2010-2011: Star Circle Quest: Search for the Next Kiddie Superstars (Season 4) ===
On December 4, 2010, the show was re-launched as a Saturday primetime program hosted by KC Concepcion with Bugoy Cariño and Xyriel Manabat as kid co-hosts respectively. Audition ran from November 27 to 29, 2010, and Rowell Santiago reprised his role as judge from Season 1 along with the new female judges namely Vina Morales and Gladys Reyes.

The kids who made it to the Magic Circle of 10 were Ogie Escanilla, Brenna Peñaflor, Clarence Delgado, Kyline Alcantara, Joshen Bernardo, Janine Berdin, Jelo Echaluce, Maurice Mabutas, Kristoff Meneses and Veyda Inoval.

Grand Questors Day

The Magic Circle of 6 were Brenna Peñaflor, Kristoff Meneses, Maurice Mabutas, Clarence Delgado, Veyda Inoval, and Jelo Echaluce.

Brenna Peñaflor was crowned as the Grand Girl Kiddie Superstar and Clarence Delgado was crowned as the Grand Boy Kiddie Superstar on February 19, 2011.

== Awards ==
Star Circle Quest won the Star Awards for 2004 Best Talent Search Program. Jodi Sta. Maria and Luis Manzano as Best Talent Search Program Host.

== See also ==
- Star Magic
