= List of Your Song episodes =

Your Song is a musical anthology program broadcast by ABS-CBN in the Philippines.

== Year 1 ==
=== Season 1 ===
Original airdate	Starring	Song title	Singer	Episode # (Total)
February 12, 2006	Anne Curtis; Luis Manzano	I'll Never Get Over You (Getting Over Me)	MYMP	1-01 (1)
Ana (Anne Curtis) is still heartbroken after her break-up with Paolo (AJ Dee). She can’t stand seeing him with Erica (Carla Humphries), his new girlfriend. She is so blinded by jealousy that she fails to notice Justin (Luis Manzano), her loyal friend who secretly loves her.
February 19, 2006	John Prats; Nancy Castiglione	Para Sa 'Yo; Ang Laban Na 'To	Manny Pacquiao	1-02 (2)
Is love worth fighting for?
February 26, 2006	Sam Milby; Toni Gonzaga	I've Fallen In Love	Sam Milby	1-03 (3)
Let yourself go. Fall in love.
March 5, 2006	Sandara Park; Joseph Bitangcol	Everything You Do	Christian Bautista	1-04 (4)
It's what you do, not your social status, that makes someone fall in love with you.
March 12, 2006	Carlo Aquino; Angelica Panganiban; JB Magsaysay; Vanna Garcia	Can't Let You Go	Cueshe	1-05 (5)
Brief synopsis
March 19, 2006	Franzen Fajardo; Iya Villania	Narda	Kamikazee	1-06 (6)
What happens when a sosyal girl meets the jologs guy?
March 26, 2006	Bea Alonzo; Jason Gainza	You Win The Game	Mark Bautista	1-07 (7)
Who will win in the game of love?
April 2, 2006	Sarah Geronimo; Mark Bautista	Forever's Not Enough	Sarah Geronimo	1-08 (8)
Mitch (Sarah Geronimo) has trouble accepting her break-up with ex-boyfriend Waldo, especially when he blames her strange behavior for the break-up. When she absentmindedly leaves her things in a cab, the cab driver, Jess (Mark Bautista) return them to her. It looks like the two are destined to be together, but a shocking medical diagnosis threatens their happiness.
April 9, 2006	Kristine Hermosa; TJ Trinidad; Rico Robles	Sabihin Mo Na	Top Suzara	1-09 (9)
Brief synopsis
April 16, 2006	Joross Gamboa; Roxanne Guinoo	To Love Again	U-Turn	1-10 (10)
Will their families get in the way of their love?
April 23, 2006	Nikki Gil; Geoff Eigenmann	If I Keep My Heart Out of Sight	Nikki Gil	1-11 (11)
Can old-fashioned and modern ways mix well?

=== Season 2 ===
The May 14, 2006, episode of Your Song was a special screening for Bituing Walang Ningning (see Specials below). It is therefore not listed in this table as a regular episode of this series.

Original airdate	Starring	Song title	Singer	Episode # (Total)
April 30, 2006	Zanjoe Marudo; Say Alonzo	Nasaan Ka?	Pupil	2-01 (12)
A sosy girl changes when she gets set up by her friends on a camping trip.
May 7, 2006	Uma Khouny; Cassandra Ponti	Perfect Combination	Passage	2-02 (13)
Brief synopsis
May 21, 2006	Meryll Soriano; Bernard Palanca	I	6 Cycle Mind	2-03 (14)
Brief synopsis
May 28, 2006	John Wayne Sace; Arron Villaflor; Maja Salvador	Akin Ka Na Lang	Itchyworms	2-04 (15)
Kate (Maja Salvador), is heartbroken after her breakup with her ex-boyfriend; until she meets Totoy and Paolo, two boys who are willing to give her every whim. But will she be able to get what she really wants?
June 4, 2006	Keanna Reeves; Rustom Padilla	Pwede Ba?	Soapdish	2-05 (16)
Brief synopsis
June 11, 2006	Niña Jose; Bam Romana; Fred Payawan	Akap	Imago	2-06 (17)
Brief synopsis
June 18, 2006	Matt Evans; Olyn Membian; Joaqui Mendoza; Brenda Fox	Dahilan	Barbie Almalbis	2-07 (18)
Brief synopsis
June 25, 2006	Diether Ocampo; Phoemela Barranda; Roxanne Barcelo	Tattooed On My Mind	Sitti Navarro	2-08 (19)
One man. Two sisters. Can love overcome a terrible lie?
July 9, 2006	Heart Evangelista; Derek Ramsay	Wish	Michael Angelo	2-09 (20)
Ria (Heart Evangelista) is an actress who is forced to publicly deny her relationship with boyfriend Mark (Derek Ramsay) to protect her loveteam with fellow actor James (Luis Alandy). Is this the end of her relationship with Mark? Or will Ria be strong enough to fight for her heart's wish?
July 16, 2006	Clare Cabiguin; Jason Abalos	241	Rivermaya	2-10 (21)
A boyish lass turns into a beautiful lady.
July 23, 2006	Jasmine Trias; TJ Trinidad	Kung Paano	Jasmine Trias	2-11 (22)
Charry (Jasmine Trias) meets her match played by TJ Trinidad; her bodyguard.

=== Season 3 ===
Original Airdate	Starring	Song title	Singer	Episode # (Total)
July 30, 2006	Carlo Aquino; Jamilla Obispo	Ikaw Pa Rin	Juana	3-01 (23)
Can love prevail over a ruined friendship?
August 6, 2006	Rachelle Ann Go; Christian Bautista	If You Walk Away	Rachelle Ann Go	3-02 (24)
Due to social status, Joanne (Rachelle Ann Go) and Michael (Christian Bautista) can't be together. They both planned to go away from home but secretly, (Rachelle's mom) paid Michael to never show himself to Joanne. Years passed and they never saw each other. Joanne fell in love with another guy and decided to get married; surprisingly, the priest that was supposed to hold the marriage was Michael! Will love blossom between them again?
August 13, 2006	Aldred Gatchalian; Valeen Montenegro	Half Crazy	Freestyle	3-03 (25)
It started with a deal. Can they fall in love for real?
August 20, 2006	Rayver Cruz; Shaina Magdayao	Cuida	Sugarfree	3-04 (26)
Can there be more to it than an offer to help?
August 27, 2006	Gerald Anderson; Kim Chiu	Alive	Frio	3-05 (27)
Abby (Kim Chiu) is the straight-laced, straight-A student. Migs (Gerald Anderson) is the trouble-maker who's used to getting away with pranks in school. But Migs is totally unprepared when he realizes Abby is the girl of his dreams and the daughter of the teacher he just got in trouble with.
September 3, 2006	John Lloyd Cruz; Bea Alonzo	Ok Lang	Shamrock	3-06 (28)
When trust is broken, does love still stand a chance?
September 10, 2006	Jason Abalos; Maja Salvador	Sayang ang Lahat	True Faith	3-07 (29)
Brief synopsis
September 17, 2006	Dominic Ochoa; Angelika dela Cruz	Malas Mo	Protein Shake	3-08 (30)
Anacleta is a girl with high hopes in life. But when she left her hometown for Manila, she is accidentally run over by Jonas (Dominic) and the accident destroys her face. Jonas shoulders the expense for her plastic surgery. Anacleta's new face is Anna (Angelika dela Cruz), who shocks Jonas because she looks exactly like Jonas' dead girlfriend. And just when Jonas falls for Anna, her ex-boyfriend rushes shows up to win back the love of Anacleta. Will Anna choose to remain as Anna? Or will she go back to being Anacleta?
September 24, 2006	Joaqui Mendoza; Brenda Fox	Bigay na Bigay	Mano-Mano	3-09 (31)
A guy pretends that he is rich to impress the woman of his dreams.
October 1, 2006	Janus Del Prado; Carla Humphries	Panalangin	Gish	3-10 (32)
Jessica (Carla Humphries) is a young business-owner who feels the pressure of a managing an ailing restaurant. Carlo (Janus del Prado) is the chef whose emotions affect the quality of his dishes. Will Carlo win Jessica's heart? Or will Jessica's former suitor Wesley (Cris Martinez) steal it away?
October 8, 2006	Carlo Aquino; Sarah Geronimo	Pers Lab	Sarah Geronimo	3-11 (33)
Can a popular star fall in love with an ordinary girl?
October 15, 2006	Vhong Navarro; Toni Gonzaga	Annie Batungbakal	Toni Gonzaga	3-12 (34)
Brief synopsis
October 22, 2006	Zanjoe Marudo; Mariel Rodriguez	Kasi Naman	Nikki Gil	3-13 (35)
Paolo (Zanjoe) and Justine (Mariel) have been having financial difficulties since they settled down. They've spent all their savings on a new house and Paolo's carwash business has not picked up. Their frequent fights over money finally drive them apart. Will they be able to fix their differences and get back together again?
October 29, 2006	Kim Chiu; Mikee Lee	Bitin Sa Iyo	Erik Santos	3-14 (36)
Brief synopsis

=== Season 4 ===
Original Airdate	Starring	Song title	Singer	Episode # (Total)
November 5, 2006	Judy Ann Santos; Ryan Agoncillo	No Ordinary Love	Judy Ann Santos	4-01 (37)
Brief synopsis
November 12, 2006	Kristine Hermosa; Diether Ocampo	Ilalim ng Ulan	Blow	4-02 (38)
A kid sets up her brother and teacher after her brother's break-up with his girlfriend.
November 26, 2006	Heart Evangelista; Jericho Rosales	Ngayong Gabi	Jeans	4-03 (39)
How far can Missy and Mike go to prove their love for each other?
December 3, 2006	Sam Concepcion; Empress Schuck; Makisig Morales; Kathryn Bernardo	Let it Snow	Imago	4-04 (40)
Can the Christmas spirit solve a feud between families and save a friendship?
December 10, 2006	Maja Salvador; John Prats	My Grown Up Christmas List	MetaFour	4-05 (41)
Brief synopsis
December 17, 2006	Jake Cuenca; Angelica Panganiban	Silent Night	Sponge Cola	4-06 (42)
Brief synopsis
December 24, 2006	Piolo Pascual; Claudine Barretto	God Bless Ye Merry Gentlemen	Orange and Lemons	4-07(43)
Brief synopsis
January 7, 2007	Rica Peralejo; Bernard Palanca	May Tama Rin Ako	Jay-R Siaboc	4-08 (44)
Brief synopsis
January 14, 2007	Matt Evans; Melissa Ricks; Olyn Membian	Pangarap Lang	Yeng Constantino	4-09 (45)
Will you be able to fight for your love?
January 21, 2007	Angelika dela Cruz; Derek Ramsay	Kailan Kaya	Ronnie Liang	4-10 (46)
Brief synopsis
January 28, 2007	Jericho Rosales; Toni Gonzaga	Wishing Lampara	Eman Abatayo	4-11 (47)
Brief synopsis

== Year 2 ==
=== Season 5 ===
Original Airdate	Starring	Song title	Singer	Episode # (Total)
February 4, 2007	Gerald Anderson; Kim Chiu	Someday	Nina Girado	5-01 (48)
Ever fell in love with your best friend? Jodie (Kim) realizes that she's in love with her best friend, Arkin (Gerald). Unfortunately, it seems that the feeling isn't mutual, so Jodie decides to avoid him instead. Can she continue avoiding him that long? Are they really destined for each other?
February 11, 2007	Heart Evangelista; John Prats	With You	MYMP	5-02 (49)
Jay (John), who is about to get married, seeks Aschelle's (Heart) help, an events coordinator who's known for her extravagant wedding proposals. Unfortunately, her plans turn out to be a letdown, leading to John and his girlfriend's break up. Unfortunately, Jay is building up feelings for Aschelle.
February 18, 2007	Sarah Geronimo; Carlo Aquino	Carry My Love	Sarah Geronimo	5-03 (50)
Francis (Carlo) is a spoiled rich bachelor who is perpetually bugged by his parents to get married. As a result, he asks Pia (Sarah), an employee of the theme park their family owns, to pretend that she's his fiancée. It seems that Francis got everything planned out, except for one thing: he didn't count on them actually falling in love!
February 25, 2007	Judy Ann Santos; Ryan Agoncillo	I'll Have To Say I Love You In A Song	Ryan Agoncillo	5-04 (51)
Emily (Judy Ann), a carinderia owner, who suddenly wins a Win-A-Date contest with Robbie (Ryan), a hunky commercial model. The admiration ends there, however, when Emily finds out that Robbie is nothing but a pompous and self-centered brat. But Robbie begins to get attracted to her, because she's the only genuine person he's been with, and the attraction takes a loving turn...
March 4, 2007	Iya Villania; Derek Ramsay	Never Knew Love Like this Before	Lani Misalucha	5-05 (52)
Becca (Iya), a snooty girl who didn't think of anything else but to earn hard cold cash and live a glamorous life. To make matters worse, she never fails to look down, and berate other people who don't earn as much as she does. One of those less fortunate people is her neighbor, Eric (Derek). By some weird twist of fate, Becca's house burns down, and with it goes everything she has earned, and took pride on. What happens to our poor, little rich girl now? Will this humbling experience change her life for the better, or make her personality worse?
March 11, 2007	Anne Curtis; Oyo Boy Sotto	Someone in the Dark	Lani Misalucha	5-06 (53)
Get to take a look at the father and son tandem, Berting (Bayani Agbayani) and Aries (Oyo Boy). Considered as cowards in their area, they're often the laughingstock of the town, especially when the pawnshop Berting works for as a security gets held up! However, it seems that things are about to change for both Aries and his dad, as he discovers an amulet that gives him courage! Will things turn great for Berting and Aries? Will Aries finally sum up the courage to approach Lalaine (Anne), the girl he crushes on? Will the amulet really change everything for the two?
March 25, 2007	Roxanne Guinoo; Jake Cuenca	Very Special Love	Lani Misalucha	5-07 (54)
Mika (Roxanne) is a nice girl who works in a restaurant. One day, she come across her grandmother's old cookbook, and decides to try out a certain recipe inscribed there. As fate would have it, Gino (Jake) passes by, and decides to have a taste of Mika's "experiment". He likes it, and soon, the two develop feelings for each other. Is the old cookbook really that magical? How long will the magic last? Will Mika and Gino be able to stay together even if a certain conflict comes their way?
April 1, 2007	Jasmine Trias; Kris Lawrence	I'd Rather	Jasmine Trias	5-08 (55)
Joanne (Jasmine) and Sid (Kris) are in a contest to win money to support her grandparents' music store. Sid was sent to the Philippines to help her. They enter a contest as a duet to win money. Sid gets hurt while protecting Joanne from a man trying to hurt her. His mother stops him from entering the contest because of his injury. Joanne suggests to do it by herself and find a new partner. The man who hurt her now has to be her partner because her friend said he can sing well. Sid loves Joanne and wanted to say it. Will Sid be replaced and not confess his love?
April 8, 2007	Eliza Pineda; John Manalo	Ikaw Lamang	Silent Sanctuary	5-09 (56)
We see how friendship prevails despite trying times in Eliza and John's story. Streetkids competing for customers in a local market, one might as well say that these two may have hit off a rocky start. Surprisingly, they're really good friends, so good that Eliza was more than willing to put her life in danger just so she can save John from death! However, things seemingly change when Eliza gets adopted by a rich family. Will their friendship still be able to withstand that, even if they're now worlds apart? Note: This episode is currently the highest rated Your Song episode.
April 15, 2007	Toni Gonzaga; Piolo Pascual	Kasalanan Ko Ba?	Toni Gonzaga	5-10 (57)
Tim (Piolo) is a man suffering from depression and heartbreak because his longtime girlfriend left him. Devastated and feeling hopeless, he planned to commit suicide. Just as he was about to jump from a bridge, he sees Carmela (Toni), a lonely woman, looking for her baby, whom she has put for adoption, because of poverty. Affected by the woman's sadness, Tim volunteered to help Carmela in looking for her baby. As the two become closer, he realized that there's more to life than his finished relationship.
April 22, 2007	Maja Salvador; Jay-R Siaboc	Cool Off	Yeng Constantino	5-11 (58)
Maja and Jay-R are certified lovebirds. Unfortunately, their relationship is tampered by their countless fights, as they have different perspectives in life: Maja wants to try her luck in Manila, and eventually live the good life there. Jay-R on the other hand, years for a simple, rural life in the province, away from the hustle and bustle of the city. As luck would have it, a window of opportunity opens for Maja when she signs up for the Miss Bora competition. After all, the contest is her stepping stone to her dreams. Unfortunately, this leads to a serious argument between her and her boyfriend! Will this be the end for our lovebirds?
April 29, 2007	Luis Manzano; Irish Fullerton	If We Fall in Love	Yeng Constantino	5-12 (59)
Brief synopsis
May 20, 2007	Luis Manzano; Anne Curtis	Ikaw	Ronnie Liang	5-13 (60)
Louie (Luis) is a training nurse at the hospital where Allison (Anne), a doctor, works at. When given charge to Allison's comatose father, Louie realizes he's fallen in love with Allison. But she is set on marrying the man her father has chosen for her. Will Louie end up with a broken heart, or will Allison return his love?

=== Season 6 ===
Original Airdate	Starring	Song title	Singer	Episode # (Total)
May 27, 2007	Precious Lara Quigaman; Ronnie Liang	Salamat	Yeng Constantino	6-1 (61)
It feels like the vacation of a lifetime for Precious and her boyfriend as they hit the sands of Boracay for some fun under the sun! As such, Precious gets the shock of a lifetime when she discovers her boyfriend cheating on her! Taking things in her own hands, Precious decides to drown her sorrows in alcohol, and to get back at her boyfriend in the process! However, she gets more shocked the following morning when she sees a tattoo of a guy's name imprinted on her body! Who is this guy, and what role did he play in Precious life?
June 3, 2007	Sam Milby; Pokwang	Breaking Up is Hard to Do	Mak and the Dudes	6-2 (62)
Rich widow meets blind masseur. The Rich Widow (Pokwang) has been looking for some love after her husband's death. Ever since then, she has felt self-conscious and unsatisfied by herself. Will a blind masseur (Sam Milby) be able to remove all the blockades the widow has developed from her heartaches?
June 10, 2007	Zanjoe Marudo; Nikki Gil	Ang Pag-ibig Kong Ito	Sheryn Regis	6-3 (63)
Brief synopsis
June 17, 2007	Shaina Magdayao; Rayver Cruz	Break It To Me Gently	Mark Bautista	6-4 (64)
Nico (Rayver) is Maya's (Shaina) boyfriend, who works as a tricycle driver. Maya decides to introduce him to their parents one day, but upon seeing his sister's rich and educated boyfriend, she decides to back out! Will this mark the beginning of a love gone awry, or serve as a trial that will make the couple's love stronger?
June 24, 2007	Toni Gonzaga; Piolo Pascual	Kasalanan Ko Ba?	Toni Gonzaga	6-5 (65)
Tim (Piolo) is a man suffering from depression and heartbreak because his longtime girlfriend left him. Devastated and feeling hopeless, he planned to commit suicide. Just as he was about to jump from a bridge, he sees Carmela (Toni), a lonely woman, looking for her baby, whom she has put for adoption, because of poverty. Affected by the woman's sadness, Tim volunteered to help Carmela in looking for her baby. As the two become closer, he realized that there's more to life than his finished relationship.
July 1, 2007	Kristine Hermosa; Vhong Navarro	Himala	Yeng Constantino And Jay-R Siaboc	6-5 (66)
Brief synopsis
July 8, 2007	Empress Schuck; Enchong Dee; Dino Imperial	Tulak ng Bibig	Julianne	6-6 (67)
Brief synopsis
July 15, 2007	Gee-Ann Abrahan; Mickey Perz; Bodie Cruz	Ale	The Bloomfields	6-7 (68)
Who would you love our best friend or the one you truly love?
July 29, 2007	Kim Chiu; Gerald Anderson	Ngiti	Ronnie Liang	6-8 (69)
Brief synopsis

=== Season 7 ===
Original Airdate	Starring	Song title	Singer	Episode # (Total)
August 5, 2007	Derek Ramsay; Angelica Panganiban	Upside Down	6 Cycle Mind	7-1 (70)
Brief synopsis
August 12, 2007	Toni Gonzaga; Vhong Navarro	What Are The Chances	Toni Gonzaga	7-2 (71)
Jasper works at a pet shop with his playboy best friend, until he meets Gladys, a girl who he thinks his best friend is courting. Will Jasper remain loyal to his best friend or his heart??
August 19, 2007	Luis Manzano; Mariel Rodriguez	Pasan	Callalily	7-3 (72)
Abel and Adam are twin brothers, similar in both looks and personalities. However, Adam finds himself once again taking charge of his brother's messes. He crosses paths with a girl that his brother got pregnant and left, and assumes responsibility. Prioritizing them and not his girlfriend, Adam finds himself in a hard situation. He then finds himself falling for the girl. Will he put that aside to be with his girlfriend? Or will he leave his girlfriend for the mother and child? And what if Abel came back?
August 26, 2007	Wendy Valdez; Bruce Quebral	One More Chance	Piolo Pascual	7-4 (73)
Brief synopsis
September 2, 2007	Sam Milby; Sitti Navarro	Ikaw Lamang	Sitti Navarro	7-5 (74)
September 9, 2007	Andrew E. Valerie Concepcion	Ikaw, Humanap Ka Ng Panget Part 2	Andrew E.	7-6 (75)
Can a firefighter gain his love for a girl he just saved?
September 16, 2007	Jay-R Siaboc; Maja Salvador	Minsan Lang	Jay-R Siaboc	7-6 (76)
An honest police officer and a beautiful, but tomboyish, thief cross paths multiple times. Can love blossom between the two?
September 23, 2007	Sam Concepcion; Lauren Young	Even If	Sam Concepcion	7-7 (77)
How will you express your love and care to the most important person in your life?
September 30, 2007	Shaina Magdayao; Rayver Cruz	Just A Smile Away	Shamrock	7-8 (78)
Joanna starts to attend Military school. She falls in love with her drill sergeant Brian. Will Joanna be able to hide this from her father or will she lose the love of her life?
October 21, 2007	Roxanne Guinoo; Jake Cuenca	Tuyo Nang Damdamin	Silent Sanctuary	7-9 (79)
Who do you choose; the one you're in love with or the one who took care of you when the one you love went away?
November 11, 2007	Denise Laurel; Joross Gamboa	Wala Nang Hahanapin Pa	True Faith	7-10 (80)
A choice that goes beyond physical appearance.
December 16, 2007	Heart Evangelista; John Prats	Sana Ngayong Pasko	Yeng Constantino And Jay-R Siaboc	7-12 (81)
Can love overcome sickness?
December 23, 2007	Sam Concepcion; Empress Schuck	Santa Clause	Kim Chiu and Shaina Magdayao	7-13 (82)
Can friendship solve family problems?
December 30, 2007	Oyo Boy Sotto; Kristine Hermosa	Christmas Is	Erik Santos	7-14 (83)
A spoiled brat learns the spirit of Christmas.
January 6, 2008	Victor Basa; Bea Alonzo	Tayong Dalawa	Kiko Machine	7-15 (84)
Brief synopsis
January 13, 2008	Matteo Guidicelli; Erich Gonzales	Bakit Labis Kitang Mahal	Kathryn Bernardo	7-16 (85)
Brief Synopsis
January 27, 2008	Valerie Concepcion; Rafael Rosell; Jairus Aquino	Superstar Ng Buhay Ko	Kathryn Bernardo	7-17 (86)
Brief Synopsis

== Year 3 ==
As an opening salvo of its third year, there is a new version of Your Song, ABS-CBN's anthology show featuring stories based on chosen love songs. Each story arc will now be shown for a whole month changing parts with Love Spell that'll have a weekly episode.

=== Season 8 ===
Original air date	Starring	Song title	Singer	Episode # (total)
February 3, 2008; February 24, 2008	Heart Evangelista as Arah; Jason Abalos as Erik; Erich Gonzales as Elizabeth	Muntik Na Kitang Minahal	Erik Santos	8-1 (87); 8-4 (90)
Heart portrays a career woman in a well-known advertising company. Because of her beauty, wit and charm, many people look up to her and treat her as a role model. As perfect as her career may seem, the same cannot be told of her love life. Thinking and hoping for a marriage proposal from her longtime boyfriend, she will find out that Ryan (AJ) is in love with someone else and will be married soon! Erik (Jason) comes into the scene, the younger boy whom she sees as a friend who has helped her go through her difficult times. As time passes, will Arah (Heart) learn to love Erik (Jason)? Or will she only hurt Elizabeth (Erich), her assistant (Elizabeth) who is truly in love with Erik (Jason)?
March 2, 2008; March 30, 2008	Maja Salvador as Andrea; Rayver Cruz as Jack; Victor Basa as Serge; Valeen Montenegro as Mao	Kapag Ako Ay Nagmahal	Rayver Cruz	8-5 (91); 8-9 (95)
"Kapag Ako Ay Nagmahal" tells the story of two dancers, Andrea (Maja) and Jack (Rayver), whose accidental meeting started off on the wrong foot. Andrea dreams of following her mom's footsteps as a prima ballerina while Jack is a member of a hip-hop dance group called "Dancesynergy". Jack stepping on Andrea's injured foot at a bar will begin a series of clashes between them. But in the midst of conflict, will they hear the music that unites the beating of their hearts? Ballerina meets the hip hop. Will they jive? Or will they clash?
April 13, 2008; April 27, 2008	Matt Evans as Paolo; Melissa Ricks as Bettina	Sayang na Sayang	Sheryn Regis	8-10 (96); 8-12 (98)
Bettina and Paolo were childhood friends. Due to Paolo's (Matt Evans) migration to the United States, they were forced to be separated even though their mothers, who have been best friends for a long time, want them to end up together, and after Paolo promises that one day, he would marry Bettina (Melissa Ricks). When Paolo comes home to the Philippines, they sleep together and Bettina gets a surprise—she's pregnant. Paolo, a straight-shooter and a definite carefree person with a strong determination agrees to something that would change both of their lives forever—marriage. This happens even though Paolo doesn't love Bettina. He just does it for the baby's sake and to lessen her suffering. They both don't want their child to be illegitimate. Will their reason for marriage be suffice, or will the way they treat each other lead to their marriage's downfall?
May 4, 2008; May 25, 2008	Joross Gamboa as Bobby; Alex Gonzaga as Jen; Victor Basa as John	Without You (Here I Am)	Erik Santos	8-13 (99); 8-16 (102)
In a love triangle between two guys and a girl, you would think that the latter is the one being fought about. But what if one of the former turns out to be a bisexual male? Such is the hilarious dilemma of Bobby (Joross Gamboa) who falls in love at first sight with his neighbor John (Victor Basa)? As if this is not complicated enough, John's sister Jen (Cathy Gonzaga) is also set on winning Bobby's heart. Little do any of them know that they are consulting the same magazine article to help them capture the man of their dreams. Who will end up with whom in this bizarre love triangle? Jen (Cathy) will fall in love with Bobby (Joross).
June 1, 2008; June 29, 2008	Zanjoe Marudo as Miguel; Angelica Panganiban as Ria; Wendy Valdez as Chinney; TJ Trinidad as Aris	I'll Take Care of You	Richard Poon	8-17 (103); 8-21 (107)
Their unhappy marriage with their respective spouses will push Miguel (Zanjoe Marudo) and Ria (Angelica Panganiban) to cross paths. What started as friendship however turns into something more meaningful with each day that they're together? How can falling in love be wrong if it feels so right?
July 6, 2008; July 27, 2008	Jake Cuenca as Kiko; Shaina Magdayao as Lizzie; Marvin Raymundo as Q	A Million Miles Away	Nikki Gil	8-22 (108); 8-25 (111)
Will love flourish between two people who are a million miles away in terms of status in life and personality? Bringing this romantic plot to life are two of the most beautiful faces in the industry who are paired up for the first time on TV. Get to know Lizzie (Shaina Magdayao), a self-centered daughter of a wealthy businessman who wants to keep her under close watch through the help of his assistant Kiko (Jake Cuenca). The latter on the other hand is forced to act as her chaperone for the sake of the man who helped him get a good education and a stable job in his company. Lizzie won't make it easy for him though since she's determined to hook up with her arrogant boyfriend Q (Marvin Raymundo). What devious schemes will she try to accomplish just to escape Kiko's clutches?
August 3, 2008; August 24, 2008	Empress Schuck as Melai/Poor Wannabe; Dino Imperial as Onats/Hopeless Romantic; AJ Perez as Vince/Mr. Popular; Lauren Young as Paige/Ms. Popular	Impossible	KC Concepcion	8-26 (112); 8-29 (115)
Melai (Empress Schuck) has a longtime crush on down-to-earth campus heartthrob Vince (AJ Perez). Vince has a very sophisticated, snooty and possessive girlfriend Paige (Lauren Young). Melai's only comfort and support is her quiet and kindhearted best friend Onats (Dino Imperial). Onats has always been very supportive Melai in all of her endeavors. Can there be a chance for poor girl Melai to get noticed by Vince the jock? When a sudden change of events suddenly brings Melai and Vince together under one roof, will Onats still have a chance at winning his best friend's heart or will fate ultimately bring two best friends in the end.
August 31, 2008; September 28, 2008	John Prats as Melvin; Aiko Melendez as Marge	Someone Like You (How Did You Know?)	Gary Valenciano	8-30 (116); 8-34 (120)
A film teacher Marge (Aiko Melendez) got deceived by her fiancée in their wedding day. A chance encounter with Melvin (John Prats) is eventually developed into something beautiful.
October 5, 2008; January 25, 2009	Kim Chiu as April Padilla; Gerald Anderson as Joaquin (Kino) Alejandro; Enchong Dee as Jhune Crisostomo; Alex Gonzaga as Fifi; Xian Lim as Celso Alejandro; David Chua as August; Regine Angeles as Yang; Niña Jose as Jessie/Ashley; Carl Guevara as Arnold	My Only Hope (Only Hope)	Miguel Escueta	8-34 (121); 8-49 (137)
Your Song: My Only Hope: My Only Hope tells the story of nine young individuals who are faced with crucial decisions in their lives. Keeno (Anderson) takes his girlfriend Jessie (Jose) and her brother Arnold (Guevarra) to the hotel owned by his family in Boracay. Keeno is running away from the suffocating environment of home, while Jessie is haunted by guilt because of an accident she had after going on a joy ride with Keeno. Meanwhile, April (Chiu) wins a free trip to and hotel accommodations in Boracay on her birthday and takes her brother August (Chua) and friends Jhun (Dee) and Yang (Angeles) with her. While still grieving over the unjust death of her father, April is also trying to define her friendship with Jhun whom she is beginning to fall for. By chance, April and Keeno are forced to attend a party together one night. Just when these two people from different worlds start to find some common ground, Jessie's guilt pushes her over the edge and cuts short their budding relationship.
February 1, 2009	Angelica Panganiban as Sheila; Derek Ramsay as Raphael	Open Arms	Journey	8-50 (138)
Angelica Panganiban (Sheila) and Derek Ramsay (Raphael) play two people who are destined to be. Sheila is a boss who is brokenhearted after her love Warren Cristobal Chino breaks up with her while Raphael is a photographer who is brokenhearted after his wife is seeing someone new.
February 8, 2009	Nikki Gil as Rain Navarro; Billy Crawford as Buboy/Brian Flores; Rachelle Ann Go as Camile; Gabriel Valenciano as Joem	If You're Not The One	Nikki Gil	8-51 (139)
Nikki Gil (Rain) is a diva in the industry who is always sent flowers from Billy Crawford (Buboy), an aspiring singer dancer who gives up his dream in order to get a good lease on hard work and loving his job. Coinciding with these two are Rachelle Ann Go (Camille), a rose seller, and Gab Valenciano (Joem), a balladeer and Rain's boyfriend. They are unaware that all along the people they sought are there-—the change happens when Rain gets on Buboy's truck to Ilocos and they become great friends and find their social differences in each other and in Camille and Joem.
February 15, 2009	Karylle as Rose; Christian Bautista as Arnold	I'll Never Get Over You Getting Over Me	Karylle	8-52 (140)
Karylle (Rose) is a sunshine realty promo girl whose boyfriend dumps her after four years. It's only been two weeks after their breakup when she finds out that her ex-boyfriend is getting married and she sees the whole proposal. Little does she know that her ex's fiancée is actually the sister of her college classmate and rival, Arnold. So when Rose hallucinates on the road after getting drunk, Arnold is the one to see and take care of her. They make a deal to try to sabotage the relationship between Arnold's sister, Alleli (Dimples Romana), and her ex-bf, Nikos (Ron Morales), unaware that they are meant to be.
February 22, 2009	Mariel Rodriguez as Ellese; Zanjoe Marudo as Teddy	There You'll Be	Nina Girado	8-53 (141)
Mariel Rodriguez (Ellese) and Zanjoe Marudo (Teddy) play mature roles in a love story about a married couple happy in their lives and successful in their careers with a son. Everything seems all right, but is it wrong to accuse a loved one for loving someone else even though it isn't true?

=== Season 9 ===
Original Airdate	Starring	Song title	Singer	Episode # (Total)
March 1, 2009; April 26, 2009	Melissa Ricks as Celina; Empress Schuck as Cecilia; Lauren Young as Corazon; Matt Evans as Migs; Rafael Rosell as Prof. David; AJ Perez as Gary; Valeen Montenegro as Ana Marie	First Be a Woman	Gloria Gaynor	9-1 (142); 9-9 (150)
Underage revolves around three young sisters Celina, Cecilia and Corazon who grew up in the province, about to face a whole new world. As they bump with new people, their real journey begins.
May 10, 2009; June 21, 2009	Enchong Dee as Arnel; Robi Domingo as Arkin; Sam Concepcion as Bobet; Arron Villaflor as Raul; AJ Perez as Ricky; Dino Imperial as Chad; Chris Gutierrez as Brent	Gising na Kaibigan ko	Bayang Barrios	9-10 (151); 9-16 (157)
Boystown is a story that would essentially differentiate teenage boys from real men. Situated at a reform center supposedly for juvenile delinquents and street children, Cottage No. 5 houses four rebellious teens who have no sense of purpose up until coach Daniel (Romnick Sarmeinta) have encouraged them to join the swimming team led by Arnel (Dee). Their lives become more complicated, however, as the latter inevitably meets rich preppy boy Arkin (Domingo) who takes an instant dislike towards him.
June 28, 2009	Sam Milby as Will; Pokwang as Anna	Breaking Up Is Hard To Do	Mak and the Dudes	9-17 (158)
Rich widow meets blind masseur. The Rich Widow (Pokwang) has been looking for some love after her husband's death. Ever since then, she has felt self-conscious and unsatisfied by herself. Will a blind masseur (Sam Milby) be able to remove all the blockades the widow has developed from her heartaches?

=== Season 10 ===
Original Airdate	Starring	Song title	Singer	Episode # (Total)
July 5, 2009; August 16, 2009	Maricar Reyes as Amy; Sid Lucero as Obet; Jodi Sta. Maria as Carmela; Quintin Alianza as Josh	Hanggang	Zsa Zsa Padilla	10-1 (158); 10-7 (164)
Your Song: Gaano Kita Kamahal: Amy (Reyes), a piano tutor who unexpectedly falls in love with her student's father (Lucero). Things become more complicated as he turns to her for comfort because his wife, Carmela (Santamaria), focuses most of her attention to her work.
August 23, 2009; September 13, 2009	Cristine Reyes as Stella; Jaclyn Jose as Josie	Babalik Kang Muli	Regine Velasquez	10-8 (165); 10-11 (168)
Stella (Reyes) will do anything to get away from her mother Josie (Jose) who is a former prostitute and owns an ihaw-ihaw that offers "extra service" to its customers. When she got away from her mother, she had a rich boyfriend who got her pregnant but who will leave her. From that misery, she will go back to her mother and ask hers forgiveness. Josie will accept her daughter and her grandchild. Rafael "Raffy" (Marc Abaya) will have an accident, and because of that accident he is no longer capable of having a child so he decided to look for Stella and ask marriage because he wants to get his child knowing that Stella is the only hope for him to have his own. Stella is confused because it is the only man she fell in love with and eventually it is the father of her child. Stella, wanting to have a good family will come back with Raffy in Manila.
September 27, 2009; November 1, 2009	Bea Alonzo as Melissa; Sam Milby as Morrie	Tell Me Your Name	Christian Bautista	10-12 (169); 10-17 (174)
Your Song: Someone To Love: Melissa (Alonzo) turned her back on love in exchange for success as a businesswoman. But when she realizes that the only way for her dying father (Aquino) to be happy is that she presents him with a fiancé. She strikes an ex-deal with her assistant, Morrie (Milby) to act as the fiancé. But when Morrie's ambitious girlfriend Brenda (Ryan) is around, Melissa should act as his secretary. The act goes well until Melissa falls in love with Morrie. Now, it's up to her to face the truth even if it means disappointing her father and losing Morrie in the end.
November 8, 2009	Angelica Panganiban as Tammy; Derek Ramsay as Ralph	Kung Pwede Lang Sana	Bugoy Drilon	10-18 (175)
Your Song: Feb-ibig - A story of a woman named Tammy (Angelica) who's seemingly happy with her life as a career woman suddenly knocks her head off and starts to realize that she has so much success in her hands yet she has no one to share it with. In her encounter with Ralph (Derek Ramsay), love will blossom between the two. However, a big revelation will alter their relationship.
November 22, 2009; December 20, 2009	Roxanne Guinoo as Monica; Jake Cuenca as Jordan	Sa Kanya	Apple Chiu	10-19 (176); 10-23 (180)
Your Song: Sa Kanya Pa Rin: Jordan (Cuenca) and Monica (Guinoo) married young, so when they lose their child, this caused a rift in their relationship with Monica asking for an annulment. Jordan still loves his wife but wants her to be happy so he unwillingly agrees to the annulment. Monica then marries another man, Lucas (Ron Morales), while Jordan meets Giselle (Maxene Eigenmann) who helps him reach his goals. But circumstances keep throwing Jordan and Monica together until they finally admit that they love each other and so they pursue a secret relationship with their exes, they now know they are meant to be together but how can their relationship survive when Monica is now married to another man? Will they have a second chance at love?

== Year 4 ==
=== Season 11 ===
Original Airdate	Starring	Song title	Singer	Episode # (Total)
January 3, 2010; January 31, 2010	Toni Gonzaga as Sarah; Luis Manzano as Nico	Please Be Careful with My Heart	Christian Bautista & Sarah Geronimo	11-1 (181); 11-5 (185)
My Last Romance: Nico (Manzano) is a son of a painter; his mother died giving him birth. He and his grandmother dream that he will follow his mother's footsteps as a painter. He has been having "artist block" resulting to no artworks for years until he found Sarah (Gonzaga), a mysterious woman who hides her image because her secret might be revealed, she will be Nico's inspiration to paint again. Somehow, Nico's grandmother (Gloria Romero) feels a somewhat connection with Sarah in the past and disagrees with his love to her. Another conflict was his longtime friend Katrina (Alessandra de Rossi) has a secret love to Nico but she has a boyfriend Vince (Marvin Raymundo), who owns the gallery. Katrina's jealousy to Nico's affair with Sarah will provoke her to do anything to get rid of Sarah, leading her to unveil the mystery in Sarah's personality.
February 7, 2010; March 7, 2010	Pokwang as Lovely; Jason Abalos as Javier	Munting Hiling	Hannah Flores	11-6 (186); 11-10 (190)
Love Me, Love You: Lovely (Pokwang) dreams of a fairytale love story wherein a handsome man would fall in love with her despite her average physical appearance. Her dream comes true as she inherits a make-up company owned by her long lost father. In her new world, she meets corporate lawyer Javier (Abalos) who was used by Steph (Desiree del Valle) as an accessory to get the other share of inheritance from the company. Will Lovely be a permanent man-hater when she discover Steph's evil scheme? Or will she get the fairytale happy ending that she's longing for?
March 21, 2010; April 18, 2010	Gerald Anderson as Daniel; Gardo Versoza as Mario; Sam Pinto as Sam; Paul Jake Castillo as Paul Jake; Tom Rodriguez as Tom; Johan Santos as Johan; Cathy Remperas as Cathy; Hermes Bautista as Hermes; Rica Paras as Rica; Riza Mae Patria as Patria	Kung Wala Na Nga	6Cyclemind	11-11 (191); 11-15 (195)
Isla: The story begins when soon-to-be-married couple Paul Jake (Castillo) and Sam (Pinto) is invited to stay in an exclusive beach resort together with Rica (Paras), Cathy (Remperas), and Patria (Patria). But instead of coming as a small group, their common friends later join them including Hermes (Bautista), Tom (Rodriguez), and Johan (Santos) who are all out to accomplish their hidden agendas. It could have been the perfect time for rest and relaxation if not for the mysterious Daniel (Anderson) who disguises himself as a mere bankero (boat rower/driver) when he actually owns the whole island where they're at.
April 25, 2010; July 11, 2010	Judy Ann Santos as Dianne; Diether Ocampo as Gary; G. Toengi as Gina; Mylene Dizon as Melanie; Bojo Molina as Brian; Jessy Mendiola as Jessy; Lance Christopher as Lance	Tabi	Paraluman	11-16 (196); 11-27 (207)
Gimik 2010: Melanie (Mylene) and Brian (Bojo) renew their wedding vows, thus reuniting the original gang, Diane (Judy Ann), Gary (Diether), and Gina (G). But behind the happy façade, they put up during the reunion is the fact that the barkada are all dealing with their own relationship problems. The original barkada's conflicts also affects the new generation as Brian's niece Jessy, get into cat and mouse fights with Diane's nephew Lance, the head heartthrob of the school and leader of GBois, the most popular group. But, fate has a funny way of bringing them closer.
July 25, 2010; August 29, 2010	Ai-Ai delas Alas as Buena (Patricia); Kim Chiu as Yen (Karl)	Maling Akala	Brownman Revival	11-28 (208); 11-33 (213)
Maling Akala: An incident pushes Buena (Ai-ai) and Yen (Kim) to take on different personas only because they were mistaken to be someone they're not. Their pretension leads to more trouble, causing a chain of conflict which they have to deal with eventually. When the real Karl Anda comes home he is still unaware that his mother had died and that there are people pretending to be him and his mother.
September 12, 2010; October 3, 2010	Christian Bautista as James; Carmen Soo as Hannah; Bianca Manalo as Sophia	Beautiful Girl	Christian Bautista	11-34 (214); 11-37 (217)
Beautiful Girl: A Malaysian woman, Hannah (Carmen) lost her boyfriend Anthony a year ago. A year later, Anthony's heart was donated to a Filipino man named James (Christian) who has a major heart ailment. As fate continues to conspire them both, Carmen will eventually see the image of her boyfriend through Christian's personality. Trapped at the verge of letting go of the past and falling in love with a different person, Carmen finds her way back into love while throwing away bit by bit all the remnants of her past.

=== Season 12 ===
Starting season twelve, Your Song is featuring artists in several different episodes, which will feature artist acting in different characters. Therefore, each episode will have a different story each week. Each artist will have a minimum of eight episode, although with the high ratings of "Your Song Presents: Kim" it was extended to more than the minimum. Again, Kim Chiu receives high ratings on her "Your Song" episodes, just like the past seasons.

Original Airdate	Starring	Song title	Singer	Episode # (Total)
October 10, 2010; November 28, 2010	Andi Eigenmann as Rachelle w/ Jaclyn Jose as Delfina; Andi Eigenmann as Grace w/ Felix Roco as Edgar; Andi Eigenmann as Jewel w/ Robi Domingo as Marvin; Andi Eigenmann as Charlotte w/ Matteo Guidicelli as JM; Andi Eigenmann as Courtney w/ Xyriel Manabat as Emily; Andi Eigenmann as Daisy w/ Enchong Dee as Nico; Andi Eigenmann as Joanna w/ Jake Cuenca as Aries	1. Iingatan Ka; 2. Habang Buhay; 3. Tell Me; 4. Opposites Attract; 5. You are the One; 6. Hawak Kamay; 7. Catch Me I'm Fallin' for You; 8. Dahil Ikaw ang Mahal Ko	Carol Banawa; Christian Bautista; Juris; Toni Gonzaga; Yeng Constantino; Toni Gonzaga; Hanna Flores	12-1 (218); 12-8 (225)
Andi

Original Airdate	Starring	Song title	Singer	Episode # (Total)
December 19, 2010; March 27, 2011	Kim Chiu as Etang w/ Pokwang as Belma; Kim Chiu as Jackie with Ejay Falcon as Arnold; Kim Chiu as Mitch w/ Matteo Guidicelli as Julius; Kim Chiu as Dana w/ Zanjoe Marudo as Aldo; Kim Chiu as Sweety w/ Jake Cuenca as Max; Kim Chiu as Elena w/ Sam Milby as Ronnie; Kim Chiu as Elaine w/ Enchong Dee as Manny; Kim Chiu as Terresa w/ Gerald Anderson as Alfred; Kim Chiu as Joy w/ Maja Salvador as Romelyn; Kim Chiu as Wella w/ Zaijan Jaranilla as Miggy; Kim Chiu as Etang with Pokwang as Belma; Kim Chiu as Ysa w/ Derek Ramsay as Ariel; Kim Chiu as Maureen w/ Empress Schuck as Michelle; Kim Chiu as Justine w/ Vice Ganda as Mars; Kim Chiu as Abbey w/Renz Fernandez as Jepoy	Sa Kangdungan Mo; Christmas (A Time To Love); Someone Like You; If I Give You My Heart; Till The End; Buhay Ko'y Ikaw; Pangarap Lang Kita; Pagkat' Mahal Kita; Best Friends Forever; Perfect World; Sa Kangdungan Mo; For You; Awit Kay Inay; Just The Way You Are; Panaginip Lamang	Carol Banawa; Erik Santos; Matteo Guidicelli; Toni Gonzaga; Six Part Invention; Vina Morales; Parokya Ni Edgar; Bugoy Drilon; RPM; Toni Gonzaga; Carol Banawa; XLR8; Carol Banawa; Bruno Mars; Syato	12-9 (226); 12-23 (239)
Kim
