= Melissa Ricks =

Filipino actress

- Born: Melissa Marie Ricks; January 8, 1990 (age 36); Fontana, California, U.S.
- Education: Enderun Colleges
- Occupation: Actress
- Years active: 2004–2015; 2020
- Agents: Star Magic (2004–2015) Star Cinema; (2004–2015)
- Spouse: Michael Macatangay (m. 2021)
- Children: 2

Melissa Marie Ricks-Macatangay (born January 8, 1990) is a Filipino actress. She was a runner-up in the reality talent search Star Circle Quest on ABS-CBN. She is best known for playing Hiyas the lambana Princess in the series Da Adventures of Pedro Penduko

== Background ==
Melissa Marie Ricks was born on January 8, 1990, to Kelly Ricks and Josie Ricks in Fontana, California. Her father is the president and director of S&R Membership Shopping Philippines.

In 2013, Ricks and her former schoolmate Charles Togezaki welcomed their first child Kiera. Mikaela (born January 14, 2023) is her child with her non-showbiz husband, Michael Macatangay.

=== Career ===
In 2004, Ricks joined the reality talent search of ABS-CBN, Star Circle Quest. She was one of the top 10 Questors or Magic Circle of 10, and after few weeks of training, made it to the final 5 or Magic Circle of 5. In the Grand Questor's Night, she was declared as the 4th runner up.

After the contest, Ricks guested in some TV shows of ABS-CBN particularly in the youth oriented drama SCQ Reload and variety show ASAP Fanatic.

Ricks received one of her biggest breaks when she portrayed Hiyas, the apple of Pedro Penduko's eyes in the Fantaserye Komiks Presents: Da Adventures of Pedro Penduko and when she starred in the primetime drama series Iisa Pa Lamang led by Claudine Barretto.

Ricks starred in Kambal sa Uma, an afternoon drama series on ABS-CBN with Shaina Magdayao, Rio Locsin, Matt Evans and Jason Abalos. She came back abruptly to Primetime on the hit series Tanging Yaman in 2010 alongside Erich Gonzales.

Ricks was a member of ABS CBN's Star Magic.

During the 2011–2012 season, Ricks portrayed Elisa Altamira in Nasaan Ka, Elisa?, the Philippine adaptation of the Chilean 2009 drama ¿Dónde está Elisa? (later remade in United States in 2010). She then played her biggest break in the role of Johanna Montenegro in the multi-acclaimed phenomenal primetime drama series, Walang Hanggan.

In August 2024, Ricks revealed her fitness journey resulted in 31 pounds weight loss in just 8 weeks.

== Filmography ==
=== Film ===
Year	Title	Role	Notes	Source
2004	Volta	Herself	Cameo	
2007	Shake, Rattle and Roll 9	Dang	Segment: "Engkanto"	
2009	Love on Line (LOL)	Lieizzy		
2010	Paano na Kaya	Anna		
2014	Ligaw	Criselle		

=== Television ===
Year	Title	Role	Notes	Source
2004	Star Circle Quest	Herself	Finalist (Top 5)	
2004–2005	SCQ Reload	Melissa Gordon		
2004–2006	ASAP Fanatic	Herself/host		
2005	Maalaala Mo Kaya	Tricia	Episode: "Kwintas"	
2005–2013	ASAP	Herself/host		
2006	Your Song Presents: Akin Ka Na Lang			
2006	Komiks Presents: Starboy	Shasta		
2006	Komiks Presents: Da Adventures of Pedro Penduko	Reyna Hiyas		
2007	Your Song Presents: Pangarap Lang	Sybil		
2007	Komiks Presents: Pedro Penduko at ang mga Engkantao	Hiyas		
2007	Rounin	Raysian		
2007	Love Spell Presents: Hairy Harry	Sally		
2007	Princess Sarah	Mariette		
2007	Maalaala Mo Kaya	Trisha	Episode: "Balikbayan Box"	
2008	Kelly! Kelly! (Ang Hit na Musical)	Sasa	TV movie	
2008	Your Song Presents: Sayang Na Sayang	Bettina		
2008	Maalaala Mo Kaya	Monique	Episode: "Card"	
2008	Iisa Pa Lamang	Sophia Castillejos		
2009	Your Song Presents: Underage	Celina Serrano		
2009	Midnight DJ	Linette	Episode: "Kasal ng Tikbalang"	
2009	Jim Fernandez's Kambal Sa Uma	Ella Perea / Venus dela Riva		
2009	Agimat: Ang Mga Alamat Ni Ramon Revilla Presents: Pepeng Agimat	Lora Hizon		
2010	Tanging Yaman	Isabel Jacinto		
2010	Maalaala Mo Kaya	Len	Episode: "Basura"	
2010	Your Song Presents: Love Me, Love You	Ivy		
2010–2011	Banana Split	Various roles	Guest	
2010	Noah	Naomi Mondragon		
2010	Lactacyd Confidance	Herself/host		
2010	Wansapanataym	Valentina Veneracion	Episode: "Zoila's Valentina"	
2011	Maalaala Mo Kaya	May	Episode: "School ID"	
2011	Happy Yipee Yehey	Herself / Guest		
2011	Nasaan Ka, Elisa?	Elisa Altamira	Main Cast / Protagonist	
2012	Walang Hanggan	Patricia "Johanna Montenegro" Bonifacio	Main Cast / Anti-Hero	
2013	Wansapanataym	Diwata	Episode: "Flores De Yayo"	
2013	Honesto	Leah Layer	Supporting Cast / Protagonist	
2014	Ipaglaban Mo!	Nina	Episode: "Ang Pangako Mo Sa Akin"	
2015	Kapamilya, Deal or No Deal	Herself	Briefcase #19	
2015	Maalaala Mo Kaya	Mai	Episode: "Pagkain"	
2020	24/7	Belinda "Bella" Samonte	Main Cast / Anti-Hero	

== Awards and nominations ==
Year	Work	Award	Category	Result	Source
2005	SCQ Reload	PMPC Star Awards for Television	Best New Female TV Personality	Won	
