= Carl Guevara =

Filipino actor and model

- Born: Carlo Guevara; Pasay, Philippines
- Other name: Carlo
- Occupations: Actor; Model
- Years active: 2007–2020, 2024–present
- Height: 5 ft 9.1 in (176 cm)

Carlo "Carl" Guevara is a Filipino actor and model. Guevara started his career when he and his brother Paolo joined the Be Bench / The Model Search where he won along with Regine Angeles.

In 2007, he made his first television assignment when he joined the cast of Star Magic Presents: Abt Ur Luv, Ur Lyf 2 as Julio. He has also done several episodes of Your Song including My Only Hope and Someone Like You in 2008. In 2009, ABS-CBN cast him into minor roles in Kambal sa Uma and Agimat: Mga Ang Alamat ni Ramon Revilla presents Tiagong Akyat.

In 2010, he is the 5th Star Circle Questor to sign an exclusive contract with GMA Network where he appeared in SOP Rules. Aside from the network change, he also change his name from Carlo to Carl. He starred in the lead role in Dear Friend: My Stalking Heart. He is also slated to appear in The Last Prince

== Filmography ==
=== Films ===
Year	Title	Role
2008	Desperadas 2	Cesar Tan Bantug
2009	Biyaheng Lupa	Mickey
2009	Shake, Rattle & Roll XI (Ukay-Ukay)	Young Joaquin
2010	Mamarazzi	Louie
2014	Flying Kiss	
2024	G! LU	Aaron
2025	100 Awit Para Kay Stella	

=== Television ===
Year	Title	Role
2007	Be Bench / The Model Search	Himself
2007	ASAP	Himself
2007	Star Magic Presents: Abt Ur Luv, Ur Lyf 2	Julio
2007	Star Magic Presents: Astigs: Luvin' Life	Llai
2008	Kung Fu Kids	Guest Actor
2008	Dyosa	Guest Actor
2008	Your Song Presents: Someone Like You	Guest Actor
2008	My Only Hope	Arnold Singson
2008–2009	Lipgloss	Jose Mari
2009	Jim Fernandez's Kambal Sa Uma	Benjie
2009	Agimat: Mga Ang Alamat ni Ramon Revilla presents Tiagong Akyat	Buboy Arnaiz
2010	SOP Rules	Himself
2010	Dear Friend: My Stalking Heart	Julio
2010	The Last Prince	Jerrick Santella
2010	Show Me Da Manny	Luis
2010	Pilyang Kerubin	Carding (Guest Role)
2010	Party Pilipinas	Himself
2010	JejeMom	Jhong Jilaro
2010	Bantatay	Norbert
2010	Puso ng Pasko: Artista Challenge	Challenger
2011	Elena M. Patron's Blusang Itim	Melchor Reyes
2011	Spooky Nights Presents: Sumpa	Mark
2012	My Beloved	Junic Tablante
2012	Chef Boy Logro: Kusina Master	Himself/Guest Star
2012	Hindi Ka na Mag-iisa	Dennis
2013	Bukod Kang Pinagpala	Andrew Alfonso
2013	Titser	Neil
2014	Wagas: Halloween Special	Ryan
2014	Wattpad Presents: Almost a Cinderella Story	Alden
2015	Wattpad Presents: Mistakenly Meant for You	John Fitzgerald Kennedy "Fire" Zamora
2015	Wattpad Presents: Heartbreaker	Dustin Parker
2015	Wagas	Aeinghel
2015	Mars	Himself/Guest
2015	Imbestigador	Rene
2015	Karelasyon: Scandal	Leo
2015	Pepito Manaloto	Romeo
2016	Karelasyon: Unico Hijo	Jay
2016	Hahamakin ang Lahat	Dindo
2017	Imbestigador	Elven
2017	Wagas	Mac-mac
2020	Love of My Life	Kiel Oliveros
2025	It's Showtime	Himself
