= Tanging Yaman (TV series) =

2010 Philippine television drama series

- Title card
- Genre: Political drama; Romance
- Created by: ABS-CBN Studios
- Developed by: ABS-CBN Studios
- Written by: Rondel P. Lindayag; Dindo Perez
- Directed by: Manny Q. Palo; Lino S. Cayetano; Trina N. Dayrit
- Starring: Erich Gonzales; Enchong Dee; Ejay Falcon; Melissa Ricks; Matt Evans
- Theme music composer: Fr. Manoling Francisco, S.J.; Philip Gan
- Opening theme: "Tanging Yaman" by Agot Isidro
- Composers: Rommel Villarico; Idonnah Villarico
- Country of origin: Philippines
- Original language: Filipino
- No. of episodes: 92

Production
- Executive producers: Carlo Katigbak; Cory Vidanes; Laurenti Dyogi; Roldeo T. Endrinal
- Producers: Brenda Lee Estocapio; Julie Anne R. Benitez
- Production locations: Manila, Philippines
- Cinematography: Romy Vitug; Genie Oyong
- Editor: Adz Perez
- Running time: 30–45 minutes
- Production company: Dreamscape Entertainment Television

Original release
- Network: ABS-CBN
- Release: January 11 – May 21, 2010

Tanging Yaman (International title: Only Treasure / transl. Only Wealth) is a 2010 Philippine television drama series broadcast by ABS-CBN. Directed by Manny Q. Palo, Lino S. Cayetano and Trina N. Dayrit, it stars Erich Gonzales, Melissa Ricks, Enchong Dee, Ejay Falcon, and Matt Evans. It aired on the network's Primetime Bida line up and worldwide on TFC from January 11 to May 21, 2010, replacing Katorse and was replaced by Momay.

== Production ==
=== Casting ===
Erich Gonzales got her second main character role as Fina on the series. Gonzales will also be reunited with her co-stars from Katorse, Ejay Falcon and Enchong Dee. The cast also includes Kambal sa Uma stars Melissa Ricks and Matt Evans.

From the awarded primetime series, Tayong Dalawa, veteran actress Agot Isidro, Mylene Dizon, and Jodi Sta. Maria also joined the cast of Tanging Yaman. First time acting for a primetime series, director and actor Rowell Santiago will play as Juan Policarpio, the fireman turned 'future president' of the Republic of the Philippines. Same as Rowell Santiago, it is also veteran actor Leo Martinez's first primetime series.

=== Locations ===
Production started in October 2009 in different places in Manila and mostly the setting of the President was taken from the Coconut Palace, where it served as the President's home.

Tapings started from the beginning of November as a rush production before the launch of the 60th Year of Philippine Dramas at the ABS-CBN Christmas trade launch year-end celebration of 2009.

== Story ==
=== Plot ===
Tanging Yaman tells a story about an incident that will ruin the lives and fortunes of two families. One family will prosper and the other will suffer. Fina and her sister Marina will grow up in poverty, whereas Isabel will be raised as the first daughter of the country. Fina resumes the responsibilities and privileges alongside being the daughter of the president. Things are not easy for Fina as she unites with her biological parents; she has to deal with Isabel and her mother Leona, who wants her position in the first family. Fina also has a crush on the son of the vice president, Jomari, who in turn is Isabel's best friend. As the story goes on Fina is discovered to be the real First Daughter and Leona goes out with Stian, Jomari's brother.

=== Synopsis ===
In the midst of a burning hospital, Marcela accidentally gives birth to a baby girl. Incidentally, Soledad also gave birth in the hospital, and dies shortly after. Commotion starts and Marcela is separated from her daughter. Her baby was lying beside Soledad, just as Marina arrives. Thinking that the infant is no other than her newborn sister, she whisks the infant to safety. Meanwhile, Leona asks Emil to look for her newborn child. Unfortunately, the event leads to Emil's rather untimely death, thus leaving Leona a widow, and Isabel without a father. While Apol brings other patients to safety, he sees bags of money on the corner. He thinks it will be a great help to his family, only to be caught by the police. After the fire, Solomon Buenavista shows his gratitude to the fireman, Juan, after thinking that he is the one who had saved the patients. Without hesitation, he awards Juan a brand new house together with a promise that he will do everything he can to save him from the hands of poverty. In contrast, Marina and Marcela's infant Fina suffer the worst luck in the world. Aside from being instant orphans, they also end up under the care of Epi's father.

Now that Juan's popularity is rampantly growing amongst the masses, Sol, who happens to be an aspiring successful politician, finally decides to take his game up a notch. In order to once and for all fulfill his dream of being one of the successful politicians in the country, he convinces Juan (who was then a senator running for presidency) to join him as his running mate. And just as Sol expected, their tandem is immediately grasped by the voters, thus making the former fireman the President of the Philippines. Despite the enormous power laid in his hands, he manages to stay humble and kind at all times. On the other hand, Fina and Isabel's paths meet once again. Both of them are accepted to the same university. Fina and Isabel became rivals, especially in Jomari's heart.

== Cast and characters ==
=== First family ===
- President Juan "John" Policarpio (Rowell Santiago): The real father of Fina. Juan is the fictional President of the Philippines. He used to be a fireman, whereas he was assumed by Sol to be the savior of many lives at the burning hospital. Together with Sol, they decided to run for presidency and vice-presidency, which they won. Being the president, Juan manages to be kind and humble towards his family. However, Juan grows an enormous rage to his sister Leona.
- First Lady Marcela Policarpio (Agot Isidro): Marcela is the fictional First Lady of the Philippines. Unbeknownst to her, she is Fina's real mother. During her pregnancy, the hospital sets on fire, in which she thought she lost her infant. Still, she has been kind to Isabel at all times, and usually comforts her as she treats her as her own daughter. When she finds out her real daughter is Fina, she feels jealous of Marina as she feels that Fina loves Marina more than her.
- First Daughter Josefina "Fina" Policarpio (Erich Gonzales): Fina is a strong but poor girl who is Juan and Marcela's daughter that was thought to be dead. During her birth, a fire occurs in the hospital wherein she gets separated from her mother. She is saved by Marina, who thought that she is her newborn sister. During childhood, she becomes good friends with her adoptive cousin Epi, who instantly falls in love with her. Fina also has feelings for Jomari (Enchong Dee). Upon befriending him, she develops abhorrence towards Isabel. Also, she cares for her adoptive father Apol very much, even if Marina disgusts him later she became the first daughter of the Philippines President. In the end, she gets engaged to Jomari Buenavista.
- Isabel Policarpio-Jacinto (Melissa Ricks): Isabel is a spoiled rich girl who is Leona and Emil's daughter. When she was born she lost her father after trying to look Marcela's daughter. She is abused by her mother often due to disobedience and impoliteness. She is willing to get everything she wants. She also likes Marcela more than her own mother. She is in love with Jomari, and frequently ignores Francis' feelings for her. Later, she will develop a feelings for Francis.She gets pregnant with Francis.
- Attorney Leona Policarpio-Jacinto (Mylene Dizon): Leona is Isabel's loving mother. Due to her husband Emil's fatality, she starts to abhor Marcela. She always throws her tantrums to Isabel whenever experiencing problems. However, she becomes nice to Isabel and Marcela after a deal was offered to her by Sol. She gets pregnant with Diego at the same time as Isabel.
- Emilio "Emil" Jacinto (Kier Legaspi): Emil is Leona's husband and Isabel's father. He died while trying to look for Marcela's daughter at the hospital fire.

=== Second family ===
- Vice President Solomon "Sol" Buenavista (Leo Martinez): The show's primary villain. Sol is Jomari's abusive father. He was a congressman. He rewards Juan an award for his mistaken heroism, and forms a tandem with him for presidency. Winning the position of the Vice President of the Philippines, he becomes greedy and ruthless. Due to the betrayal of his son Jomari, he cooperates with Leona in destroying Fina's family. In the end, he was arrested for shooting Jomari.
- Second Lady Trinidad "Trinity" Buenavista (Isay Alvarez): Trinity is Jomari's mother. She always agrees with her husband Sol at everything.
- Second Son Diego Buenavista (Ron Morales): Diego is Jomari's successful brother. He is the favorite son of his parents Sol and Trinity, the cause of Jomari's envy towards him. However, Trinity starts to dislike him due to him having sex with his fiancée at their house. He is also the father of the child of Leona.
- Second Son Jose Mari "Jomari" Buenavista (Enchong Dee): Jomari is the obedient son of Sol and Trinity. He is also abused by his father often due to disobedience, but becomes insurgent towards them after developing affection to Fina. Most girls, including Fina and Isabel, have crushes on him. He is considered as Isabel's best friend. He is also envious to his brother Diego. Arnel is the alter ego of Jomari to conceal his real identity to the public when his father disowned him when he came back to fight for his love for Fina. In the end, he gets engaged to Fina Policarpio, but he later dies while saving her.

=== Other main characters ===
- Francisco "Francis" Salazar / Baltazar (Matt Evans): Francis is a member of the Presidential Security Group. He protects Isabel when she is troubled, even though Isabel always ignore his doings. Unknown to Isabel, Francis is attracted to her, He is also the father of Isabel's child.
- Apolinario "Apol" Dimaguiba (Nonie Buencamino): Apol is Marina's father and Fina's adoptive father. He is also Artemio's brother and Epi's uncle. During the hospital fire, he saved many lives by carrying unidentified persons to safety, but is arrested for stealing money that he thought will be useful to his family's life.
- Marina Dimaguiba (Jodi Sta. Maria-Lacson): Marina is Fina's adoptive sister and Apol and Luna's daughter. She is also Epi's cousin and Artemio's niece. During her mother Luna's pregnancy, she mistakes Fina as her newborn sister. Due to his father Apol's arrest, she raises Fina by herself while experiencing poverty. She loathes her father because he leaves them alone with no one to hold.
- Artemio Inciong (Nanding Josef): Artemio is Apol's brother and Epi's father.
- Epifanio "Epi" Inciong (Ejay Falcon): Epi is Artemio's son who is considered as Fina's childhood best friend and adoptive cousin. He is attracted to Fina, and is willing to do anything for her, even if by hurting Jomari.
- Luna Dimaguiba (Adriana Agcaoili): Luna is Marina's mother and Apol's wife. She dies after giving birth at the hospital.
- Dra. Eva Fernandez (Jinky Laurel): Eva is the midwife of Luna, Leona, and Marcela. She is responsible for helping on Isabel and Fina's birth. She is the first person to discover the truth about Fina.

=== Guest cast ===
- Lauren Young as Cindy
- Jessy Mendiola as Wendy
- Jeffrey Santos as PSG Commanding Officer Baltazar
- Joseph Andre Garcia/Mark Sarayot as Young Epi
- Sophia Baars as Young Isabel
- Nash Aguas/Joshua Dionisio as Young Jomari
- Angel Sy/Mika dela Cruz as Young Fina
- Jerome Ponce as Young Francis
- Jed Montero as Alona
- Jordan Castillo
- Andre Tiangco as Senator Manrique
- Menggie Cobarrubias
- Art Acuña
- Jemaimah Sala as Fiona
- Gregorio Larrazabal as Himself

== Production ==
=== Crew ===
- Musical Scorer: Rommel Villarico and Idonnah Villarico
- Master Editor: Adz Perez
- Sound Supervision: Abet Casas
- Director of Photography: Romy Vitug and Genie Oyong
- Story and Screenplay: Ayis de Guzman, Nonoy Gobrin, Rondel P. Lindayag, Shugo Praico, and Dindo Perez
- Directed by: Manny Q. Palo, Lino S. Cayetano, and Trina N. Dayrit
- Executive Producer: Brenda Lee Estocapio
- Production Manager: Benita S. Matilac
- Executive In-Charge of Creative: Rondel P. Lindayag
- Executive In-Charge of Production: Roldeo T. Endrinal and Julie Ann R. Benitez

=== Launch ===
The series was launched as one of the ABS-CBN's offering for the 60th Celebration of Filipino Soap Opera (Ika-60 taon ng Pinoy Soap Opera), together with upcoming series such as Rubi, Kung Tayo'y Magkakalayo, Habang May Buhay, Agua Bendita, Kokey @ Ako, Magkano ang Iyong Dangal?, and a series of Precious Hearts Romances Presents seasonal episodes. The shows were launched during the ABS-CBN Trade Launch for the first quarter of 2010, entitled Bagong Simula (New Beginning).

=== Theme song ===
The theme song of the show is where its title was based. "Tanging Yaman", music by Fr. Manoling Francisco, S.J., words by Philip Gan, was originally sung by Carol Banawa for one of the most successful Philippine films. Tanging Yaman, was revived by one of the cast on the show Agot Isidro to provide the theme song for the program.

=== From Powerhouse Casts ===
- From the Characters of Tayong Dalawa are Jodi Sta. Maria, Mylene Dizon, and Agot Isidro Then From Katorse are Erich Gonzales as Elena "Nene" David, Enchong Dee as John Joseph "Jojo" Wenceslao and Ejay Falcon as Gabriel "Gabby" Arcanghel are Cast in Tanging Yaman.

== Notes ==
† - Other characters can be viewed in the word "YAMAN". They are (from left to right): Mylene Dizon as Leona Jacinto, Jodi Sta. Maria-Lacson as Marina Dimaguiba, Nonie Buencamino as Apolinario "Apol" Dimaguiba, Ron Morales as Diego Buenavista, Leo Martinez as Vice Pres. Solomon "Sol" Buenavista, Enchong Dee as Jose Mari "Jomari" Buenavista, Matt Evans as Francisco "Francis" Salazar-Baltazar, and Ejay Falcon as Epifanio "Epi" Inciong.

== Trivia ==
Rowell Santiago would later on portray once more as the fictional President of the Philippines in FPJ's Ang Probinsyano, which also airs on ABS-CBN.

== See also ==
- List of programs broadcast by ABS-CBN
- List of ABS-CBN Studios original drama series
