= Helga Krapf =

Filipino actress (born 1988)

- Born: Helga Marie Krapf (Note: Helga Krapf was born in Germany. Thus, she does not possess her mother's maiden name which is Barcena.); August 24, 1988 (age 38); East Berlin, East Germany
- Occupation: Actress
- Years active: 2004–present
- Children: 1

Helga Krapf (born Helga Marie Krapf; August 24, 1988) is a Filipino actress.

== Biography ==
=== Personal life ===
Krapf was born in East Berlin, East Germany (now Berlin, Germany) to a German father named Hans Krapf, a retired seaman and to a Filipina mother, Agnes Barcena. She has an older sister named Mary Rose. She was 10 years old when her father decided that they should leave Germany and live in the Philippines.

=== Career ===
Helga was a contestant on the first season of Star Circle Quest. She was one of the top 50 questors. She eventually got booted before making the Top 20. Later, she had a minor role on Spirits and did a cameo on Komiks Presents: Bampy. She was introduced as a Star Magic Talent on Super Inggo as Helga, one of the clan members. She has been a Kapamilya since and has appeared in several ABS-CBN shows, often appearing in the role of the villain.

In 2013, Krapf played a major role on TV5's Positive. She then resumed her work with ABS-CBN with shows such as Pusong Ligaw and Sana Dalawa Ang Puso.

In 2021, Krapf appeared in Alessandra De Rossi's directorial debut film My Amanda.

== Filmography ==
=== Television ===
Year	Title	Role	Notes	Source
2004	Star Circle Quest	Herself	Top 20	
2004	Spirits	Pinky		
2006	Komiks Presents: Bampy		Cameo	
2006–2007	Super Inggo	Helga (The Clan)		
2007	Sineserye Presents: Palimos ng Pag-ibig	Marichu		
2007	Komiks Presents: Pedro Penduko at ang mga Engkantao	Mitzi	Episode: "Mambabarang"	
2007	Love Spell Presents: My Soulfone			
2007	Princess Sarah	Antoinette		
2008	Palos	Nurse		
2008	Maalaala Mo Kaya	Darlene's classmate	Episode: "Mansyon"	
2009	Kambal sa Uma	Mary		
2009	Midnight DJ	Criselda Garcia	Episode: "Manananggal sa Campus"	
2009	Agimat: Ang Mga Alamat Ni Ramon Revilla Presents: Pepeng Agimat	Sheila		
2009	Maalaala Mo Kaya	Odette	Episode: "Isda"	
2010	Your Song Presents: Isla	Leslie		
2010	Midnight DJ	Maureen	Episode: "Bingkis Ng Bulalakaw"	
2010	Maynila	Lauren	Guest, 1 episode	
2010	Maalaala Mo Kaya	Alex	Episode: "Kwintas"	
2010	Midnight DJ	Nimfa	Episode: "Pamahiin sa Patay"	
2010	Wansapanataym	Suzy	Episode: "Kokak"	
2010	Maalaala Mo Kaya	Bing's friend	Episode: "Rosas"	
2010	Imortal			
2011	Maalaala Mo Kaya	Cristy	Episode: "School ID"	
2011	Mara Clara	Carlotta Gonzales		
2011	Maynila	Maan	Episode: "Huli Ka, Babe"	
2011	Maalaala Mo Kaya	Jenny	Episode: "Toga"	
2011	Sparkada Trip	Nora		
2011	Nasaan Ka Elisa?	Michelle		
2012	Wansapanataym	Katie	Episode: "Amanda's Da Man"	
2012	Maynila	Katy	Episode: "My Jologs Heart"	
2012	Kahit Puso'y Masugatan	Vangie Morales		
2012	Maynila	Elaine	Episode: "Love Triangle"	
2012	Wansapanataym	Christmas Fairy	Episode: "Wansapana-Ride"	
2013	Maalaala Mo Kaya	Carmeling	Episode: "Sapatos"	
2013	Cassandra Warrior Angel	Mara		
2013	Positive	Janis Santillian		
2013	Honesto	Fiona		
2014	Pure Love	Glenda Corpuz		
2015	Pangako Sa 'Yo	Marga		
2017	Wattpad Presents: Just The Benefits	Bianca		
2017	Pusong Ligaw	Patrice		
2018	Sana Dalawa ang Puso	Belle		

=== Film ===
Year	Title	Role	Notes	Source
2009	BFF (Best Friends Forever)	Mean girl	Credited as "Helga Krauff"	
2011	Forever And A Day	Eugene's sister		
2011	Babang Luksa	Kris		
2011	Won't Last A Day Without You	Lauren		
2012	24/7 in Love			
2014	Bride for Rent	Gretchen		
2016	My Rebound Girl	Bea		
2017	Mang Kepweng Returns	Young Milagrosa		
2021	My Amanda			
