= Matt Evans (actor) =

Filipino actor (born 1986)

- Born: Matthew Nicolas Evans; October 22, 1988 (age 38); Manila, Philippines
- Education: Far Eastern University
- Occupations: Actor, model, television presenter, singer, dancer
- Years active: 2006–present
- Agents: Star Magic (2006–2017; 2019–present); AGP House of Characters (2017–2019); Star Image Artist Management (2019–present)
- Known for: Komiks Presents: Da Adventures of Pedro Penduko
- Spouse: Katrina Fariñas (m. 2013)
- Children: 4 (including 1 adopted)

Matthew Nicolas Evans (born October 22, 1988) is a Filipino actor who rose to prominence after appearing in Filipino soap operas Komiks Presents: Da Adventures of Pedro Penduko, Tanging Yaman and Rosalka. Evans previously competed in Philippine reality television show Pinoy Big Brother: Teen Edition 1.

== Personal life ==
Evans was born to Thalmage Eugene Evans, an American, and Vivien Mercado Nicolas, a Filipino. He has two half siblings; his biological father left his mother before he was born and was then serving in the United States Air Force. Evans learnt from his uncle that his biological father had died from a heart attack on June 10, 2010.

Evans has a daughter with former partner, Johnelline Hickins (daughter of 1980s “Softdrink Beauty” Coca Nicolas). On October 3, 2013, Evans married Katrina Fariñas of the prominent Ilocos Norte political family. In 2014, they welcomed their first child. Evans also adopted Fariñas’ son from a previous relationship. In 2015, Evans announced that they were expecting their second child.

=== Legal trouble ===
Evans’ former partner, Johnelline Hickins, had him arrested and detained at a police precinct in Pasig on October 21, 2012, after he allegedly hurt her and her brother during an altercation at their home the day before his 26th birthday. Evans was released two days later on a ₱200 bail but denied the actor inflicted any injury on Hickins and her brother. In a statement, Evans’ legal counsel Gerly Rico said there was indeed an altercation among the three but denied that the actor injured Hickins and her brother, adding that Evans only fought back in self-defense.

== Filmography ==
=== Television ===
Year	Title	Role	Notes	Source
2006	Pinoy Big Brother: Teen Edition 1	Himself / Housemate	Evicted (Day 28)	
2006–2009; 2022–present	ASAP	Himself / Host / Performer		
2006	Your Song Presents: Dahilan	Milton		
2006	Love Spell Presents: Wanted Mr. Perfect	Homer		
2006	Komiks Presents: Da Adventures of Pedro Penduko	Pedro Penduko		
2006	Super Inggo	Pedro Penduko		
2006	Love Spell Presents: Pasko Na, Santa Ko	Paolo		
2007	Your Song Presents: Pangarap Lang	Kent		
2007	Komiks Presents: Pedro Penduko at ang mga Engkantao	Pedro Penduko		
2007	Love Spell Presents: Hairy Harry	Harry		
2007	Princess Sarah	Paul		
2008	Your Song Presents: Sayang Na Sayang	Paolo		
2008	Iisa Pa Lamang	Toby Torralba		
2008	Maalaala Mo Kaya	Pangking	Episode: "Notebook"	
2008	Maynila	Calvin	Episode: "New Year's Plea"	
2008	Everybody Hapi	Steve		
2009	Lipgloss	Nikko Lopez		
2009	Your Song Presents: Underage	Migs		
2009	Maalaala Mo Kaya	Chris	Episode: "Tasa"	
2009	Jim Fernandez's Kambal sa Uma	Gabriel "Gab" Ledesma		
2009	Maalaala Mo Kaya	Maning	Episode: "Bangka"	
2010	Tanging Yaman	Francisco "Francis" Baltazar		
2010	Maalaala Mo Kaya	Bibot	Episode: "Basura"	
2010	Rosalka	Aries Abad		
2010	Maalaala Mo Kaya	Gary	Episode: "Titulo"	
2010	Pablo S. Gomez's Juanita Banana	Prince Rikitik		
2011	Maalaala Mo Kaya	Bobit	Episode: "School ID"	
2011	Wansapanataym	Swap	Episode: "Swap"	
2011	100 Days to Heaven	Paul		
2011	Maalaala Mo Kaya	Eddie	Episode: "Tinapay"	
2011	Angelito: Batang Ama	Rolan Dimaano		
2012	Maalaala Mo Kaya	Tikboy	Episode: "Bahay"	
2012	Precious Hearts Romances Presents: Paraiso	Justin Abar		
2013	Maalaala Mo Kaya	Lando	Episode: "Ilog"	
2013	Muling Buksan ang Puso	Pancho Mercado		
2014	The Legal Wife	Young Dante		
2014	Pure Love	Jake Espiritu / Scheduler		
2014	Ipaglaban Mo!	Adam	Episode: "Ang Pangako Mo Sa Akin"	
2015	Maalaala Mo Kaya	Rico	Episode: "Kamay"	
2015	Ipaglaban Mo!	Jay-R	Episode: "Nasa Maling Landas"	
2015	Dream Dad	Paul Montelibano		
2015	Kapamilya, Deal or No Deal	Himself / Briefcase #19		
2015	Bridges of Love	Carlos' enemy (First episode)		
2015	Maalaala Mo Kaya	Phil	Episode: "Pagkain"	
2015	Maalaala Mo Kaya	Obet	Episode: "Banana Que"	
2015	On the Wings of Love	Adrian Velasco		
2016	Maalaala Mo Kaya	Samson	Episode: "Puno ng Mangga"	
2016–2017	The Greatest Love	Andres "Andrei" Alegre Jr.		
2017	Tadhana	Caleb	Episode: "Love, Israel"	
2017–2018	Pepito Manaloto	Paul		
2017	Tunay na Buhay	Himself		
2018	Dear Uge	Terrence	Episode: "Viva Probinsyana"; Credited as "Matt Evans"	
2018	Sherlock Jr.	Dindo Carazo		
2018	The Cure	Elmer		
2018	Magpakailanman	Harold	Episode: Kulam ng Karibal	
2018	My Special Tatay	Young Edgar	Special participation	
2019	Ipaglaban Mo!	Dante	Episode: "Pagkukulang"	
2019	The Killer Bride	Drunkard		
2020	A Soldier's Heart	Rasheed		
2020	24/7	Bogs		
2020	Paano ang Pasko?	Eric		
2020–2021	Paano ang Pangako?	Eric		
2022	2 Good 2 Be True	Ays		
2023	The Iron Heart	Owen		
2023–2024	Can't Buy Me Love	Emong		
2025	Incognito	Baste		
2026	Someone, Someday	Yani Noceda		

=== Film ===
Year	Title	Role	Notes	Source
2007	Shake, Rattle and Roll 9	Richard	Segment: "Engkanto"	
2009	Love on Line (LOL)	Danny		
2011	No Other Woman	Jake Escaler		
2012	The Reunion	Jay		
2012	24/7 in Love	Dave	Special Participation	
2014	Bride for Rent	Onyok dela Cruz		
2014	Once A Princess	Ricky Almeda		
2015	Must Date The Playboy	Nathan Ocampo		
2016	Always Be My Maybe	Pancho		
2016	I America			
2018	Everybody Loves Wendy			

== Awards and nominations ==
Year	Award	Category	Work	Result	Source
2008	PMPC Star Awards for Movies	New Movie Actor of the Year	Shake, Rattle, and Roll 9	Won	
