= Positive (TV series) =

- Title card
- Genre: Drama; Romance
- Written by: Benedict Mique
- Directed by: Enrico S. Quizon
- Starring: Martin Escudero; Helga Krapf; Felix Roco
- Country of origin: Philippines
- Original language: Tagalog
- No. of episodes: 13

Production
- Executive producer: Erwin Ragos Nieto
- Production locations: Metro Manila, Philippines
- Running time: 30-45 minutes

Original release
- Network: TV5
- Release: October 17, 2013 – January 9, 2014

Positive is a Philippine television drama broadcast on TV5. It follows the story of Carlo Santillan, played by Martin Escudero, a call center agent who, after having previously lived a hedonistic lifestyle, later discovers that he has since developed HIV/AIDS, and attempts to track down who might have infected him.

The series, directed by Eric Quizon, was the Philippines' first television program that directly dealt with the topic of HIV/AIDS. It premiered on at 9:00 pm on October 17, 2013 as part of TV5's primetime block, Unlike regular Philippine dramas, which air episodes daily, episodes of Positive (and For Love or Money, which preceded it) aired weekly on Thursdays.

Positive ended on January 9, 2014, after a thirteen-episode run.

== Synopsis ==
Positive follows the story of Carlo Santillan (Martin Escudero), who since grade school without knowing lived a very hedonistic lifestyle. Describing himself as the "life of the party", he freely consumed drugs and alcohol, and had numerous sexual partners since he was 12 years old. After entering rehab at the urging of his mother, Esther, Carlo has attempted to set his life straight: he has found work as a call center agent, rising through the ranks until he became operations manager, and has since married his wife, Janis (Helga Krapf), who he met when high school, and who is three months pregnant with their child.

Despite setting his life straight, Carlo started developing recurrent pneumonia symptoms, and at the urging of his doctor, had his blood screened for possible HIV infection. The tests eventually show that despite appearing healthy, not only is he HIV-positive, but he has developed AIDS. Carlo later attempts to retrace his past in order to determine who was the person that might have possibly infected him with the virus.

== Cast ==
=== Major characters ===
- Martin Escudero portrays Carlo Santillan, the operations manager of a call center who, after having previously lived a hedonistic lifestyle, discovers that he has developed HIV/AIDS. Afraid of dying young and angry at his lot, he attempts to retrace his past to determine who might have infected him with HIV.
- Helga Krapf portrays Janis Santillan, Carlo's wife. Janis meets Carlo while in high school, where she initially rebuffs his advances until they eventually get married after he exits rehab. Pregnant with their three-month-old child, she is oblivious to the fact that her husband is HIV-positive.
- Felix Roco portrays Peejay, Carlo's best friend. A guitarist in a rock band at a local bar, he continues to live the same hedonistic lifestyle he lived with Carlo while in high school. He is the first person to know that his best friend is infected with HIV.
- Bing Loyzaga portrays Esther Santillan, Carlo's mother. A principal at a local elementary school, she was the one who urged her son to enter rehab, and supported him in his attempt to overcome his hedonistic lifestyle.
- Alwyn Uytingco portrays Jeffy. He is the only son of a famous land developer. Filthy rich and gay, he's a permanent fixture in the club scene and a known drug dealer. Carlo thinks something might have happened between him and Jeffy in the past, making the latter one of his suspects.
- Malak So Shdifat portrays Miles de Guzman. She is a team leader under Carlo's call center operations and his sometime booty call. She is his first suspect because she is open to him about sleeping around with different guys whenever her OFW boyfriend is not here.
- Bianca Manalo portrays Anne. She is a popular yoga instructor who, unknown to many, has been living with HIV. She volunteers as an HIV peer counselor and helps Carlo deal with his situation.
- Rufa Mae Quinto portrays Maricris. Carlo met Maricris on Facebook. Bored in her marriage, she is Carlo's first married lover.
