= Isabel Blaesi =

Filipino actress

- Born: Isabel Blaesi; April 1, 1990 (age 36); Philippines
- Years active: 2004–2008
- Agent: Star Magic (2005–2008)

Isabel Blaesi (born April 1, 1990) is a Filipina actress. She is best known for her role as Lisa in Abt Ur Luv.

== Early life ==
Blaesi was born to a Swiss watchmaker father, Robert Blaesi, and a Filipina mother, Susan. She studied in Switzerland from fourth grade until her sophomore year.

When Blaesi returned to the Philippines, she decided to go into showbiz like her sister, Andrea of Star Magic Batch 2.

== Career ==
Isabel was one of the lucky questors of the first Star Circle Quest. She was among the top 20 questors but failed to make it to the top 10. After getting booted, she signed a contract with Star Magic and was later launched as a Star Magic Batch 13 member.

== Filmography ==
=== Television ===
Year	Title	Role	Notes
2004	Star Circle Quest	Herself	Contestant; failed to get to top 10 (Top 20)
2005	Qpids	Herself	
2006–2008	Star Magic Presents: Abt Ur Luv	Lisa	
2006	Star Magic Presents: Deal or No Deal	Ginger	
2006	Star Magic Presents: My Friend, My Love, My Destiny	Yeng's friend	
2006	Love Spell Presents: My Boy, My Girl	Rhea	
2007	Ysabella		
2007	Love Spell Presents: Shoes Ko Po, Shoes Ko 'Day!	Denise	
2008	Star Magic Presents: Abt Ur Luv, Ur Lyf 2	Lisa	
2008	Prinsesa ng Banyera		
2008	Kung Fu Kids	Karen Alvarez	
