= Secrets (2022 film) =

- Directed by: Jose Javier Reyes
- Written by: Jose Javier Reyes
- Produced by: Vincent del Rosario; Veronique del Rosario-Corpuz
- Starring: Janelle Tee; Felix Roco; Denise Esteban; Benz Sangalang
- Cinematography: Jan Oliver Evangelista
- Edited by: Chrisel Desuasido
- Music by: Jesse Lucas
- Production companies: Viva Films; LargaVista Entertainment
- Distributed by: Vivamax
- Release date: June 10, 2022
- Running time: 103 minutes
- Country: Philippines
- Languages: Filipino; English

Secrets is a 2022 Filipino erotic thriller film written and directed by Jose Javier Reyes and starring Janelle Tee, Felix Roco, Denise Esteban and Benz Sangalang. About a young couple (Tee and Sangalang) who travel to a secluded beach house and encounter trouble when the girlfriend's nephew (Roco) arrives from the Middle East, the film was produced by Viva Films and LargaVista Entertainment and released on the streaming platform Vivamax on June 10, 2022.

== Synopsis ==
The story follows a young couple whose relationship is on the rocks. Janine, an insurance manager and Christian, an IT executive spends a weekend getaway in a secluded beach house to mend their relationship until their vacation is disrupted by the presence of a seductive stranger.

== Cast ==
Main cast

- Janelle Tee as Janine
- Benz Sangalang as Christian
- Felix Roco as Leo

Supporting cast

- Denise Esteban as Felina
- Ku Aquino as Rading
- Sherry Lara as Elena

== Production ==
In 2021, Viva Communications launched its streaming platform Vivamax, a site where a large portion of original content being offered are sexploitation films and series to serve as its "differentiator" from other streaming services.

Filmmaker Jose Javier Reyes decided in 2022 to make Secrets for Vivamax, with the encouragement of director Joel Lamangan, to challenge himself in working on a "very tense, very sexual" story that other producers might not be willing to finance, stating that "it is sensitive to make a film in Vivamax and if I were to make a film like that, I want it to be different." He also cited the COVID-19 pandemic and the changing landscape of the film industry as some of the reasons he decided to direct a film for a streaming platform.

Actress Janelle Tee was continuously fed on set by Reyes after he noticed her large appetite. Actor Felix Roco was hesitant about doing nude scenes for the film, stating that he accepted the role "[b]ecause I want to work.... in reality, I was getting nervous [to do the nude scene], but I did not want to stall the shooting. I just did it so that it can be finished already."

== Release ==
Secrets was released on Vivamax on June 10, 2022. Prior to its release, an online conference for the film was held on June 3.
