= Dark Is the Night (2017 film) =

Dark Is the Night (Madilim Ang Gabi)
- Theatrical release poster
- Directed by: Adolfo Borinaga Alix Jr.
- Written by: Adolfo Borinaga Alix Jr.
- Produced by: Ma. Lourdes Gopez
- Starring: Phillip Salvador; Gina Alajar; Bembol Roco; Felix Roco
- Cinematography: Albert Banzon
- Edited by: Adolfo Alix Jr.
- Music by: Mikoy Morales
- Production companies: Sound Investment Equity; Deus Lux Mea Films; Oro de Siete Productions; Ukon Films
- Distributed by: Swift Distribution; Solar Pictures
- Release dates: September 9, 2017 (Toronto); August 15, 2018 (Philippines)
- Running time: 106 minutes
- Country: Philippines
- Language: Filipino

Dark Is the Night (Filipino: Madilim ang Gabi) is a 2017 Filipino drama film edited, written, and directed by Adolfo Alix Jr. It stars Phillip Salvador, Gina Alajar, Bembol Roco, and Felix Roco. Set in Manila against the backdrop of President Rodrigo Duterte's drug war, the film tells the story of a middle-aged couple trying to leave behind their criminal past, only for their womanizing, marijuana-using son to go missing.

Dark Is the Night had its premiere at the 42nd edition of the Toronto International Film Festival on September 9, 2017. In the Philippines, it was released through the Pista ng Pelikulang Pilipino (lit. 'Festival of Filipino Films') on August 15, 2018.

== Synopsis ==
The story follows a couple Lando and Sara who are drug pushers of Manila drug trade. As soon as the couple tried to leave their dark, criminal past behind, their only son Alan has disappeared. Risking their own lives, the couple are pulled back in to their old trade network to ask for help in finding their missing son.

== Cast ==
- Phillip Salvador as Lando
- Gina Alajar as Sara
- Bembol Roco as Boss
- Felix Roco as Alan
- Laurice Guillen as Kidlat

== Production ==
Actors Phillip Salvador and Gina Alajar previously worked together in films such as This Is My Country (1984) and Fight for Us (1989), both directed by Lino Brocka.

== Release ==
Dark Is the Night premiered at the 2017 Toronto International Film Festival on September 9, 2017. The film was released in the Philippines on August 15, 2018 through the 2018 Pista ng Pelikulang Pilipino.

== See also ==
- Bato (The General Ronald dela Rosa Story) - Alix's 2019 biographical action film about the police chief who lead Duterte's war on drugs from 2016 to 2018
