= Felix Roco =

Filipino actor

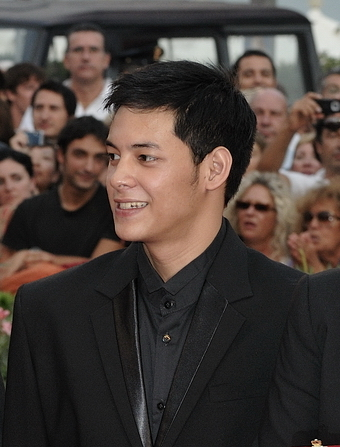
- Roco in 2009
- Born: Teodoro Felix Artadi Roco; April 12, 1989 (age 37); Lapu-Lapu City, Cebu, Philippines
- Occupation: Actor
- Years active: 2003–present
- Father: Bembol Roco
- Relatives: Dominic Roco (brother)

Teodoro Felix Artadi Roco (born April 12, 1989, in Cebu), professionally known as Felix Roco, is a Filipino actor.

== Biography ==
Roco had an internationally acclaimed performance in the Venice Film Festival double-awardee Engkwentro.

== Personal life ==
Roco is the son of actor Bembol Roco and the twin brother of actor Dominic Roco.

== Filmography ==
=== Television ===
Year	Title	Role	Notes	Source
2003	Wansapanataym: Magic Paintbrush			
2005	Qpids	Himself / Contestant		
2006–07	Super Inggo	PJ		
2007	Super Twins	Lester		
2007	Daisy Siete Presents: Tabachingching	Jiro		
2008	Daisy Siete Presents: Prince Charming and the Seven Maids	Charlie Morgan		
2008–09	Luna Mystika	Engkanto		
2009	Zorro	Diego		
2009	Daisy Siete Presents: My Shuper Sweet Love	Migs		
2010	Rosalka	Jason Sta. Maria		
2010	Your Song Presents: Andi	Edgar		
2010	Maalaala Mo Kaya: Rosas	Arnel		
2010	Wansapanataym: Super Kikay and her Flying Pagong		Episode	
2010	Star Confessions	Joseph Bintangcol		
2011	100 Days to Heaven	Young Rene	Guest	
2011	Carlo J. Caparas' Bangis	Alamid		
2011–12	Angelito: Batang Ama	Spongky		
2012	Angelito: Ang Bagong Yugto	Spongky		
2013	Positive	Peejay		
2014	Maalaala Mo Kaya: Dos Por Dos	Danny		
2015	FPJ's Ang Probinsyano	Mall Holdaper		
2015	Imbestigador: Isabela Massacre	Jemar Carpio		
2016	Karelasyon: Misyonero	Sherwin		
2016	ASAP	Himself		
2016	Forever Sucks	Kiko		
2017	Brillante Mendoza's Amo	Bino		
2023	Minsan pa Nating Hagkan ang Nakaraan	Ryan Bautista		
2024	Family Feud Philippines	Himself	Guest	

=== Film ===
Year	Title	Role	Notes	Source
2004	Otso-Otso Pamela-Mela-Wan	Marky Cabangon		
2007	Shake, Rattle & Roll 9	Ian	"Engkanto" segment	
2008	UPCAT	Lucas		
2009	Dukot			
2009	Sagrado Pamilya	Raymond Javier		
2009	Engkwentro	Richard	Luigi de Laurentis Award for a Debut Film; Premio Orizzonti	
2009	Shake, Rattle & Roll 11	Kiko	"Lamang Lupa" segment	
2010	Pendong	Jay Salvacion		
2012	Ang Nawawala	Jamie Bonifacio		
2012	El Presidente	Gregorio Del Pilar		
2013	Shift	Trevor		
2013	Death March	Fidel		
2013	Egay	Ian De Guzman		
2014	Lorna	Ardie		
2014	A Thief, a Kid & a Killer	Nico		
2015	Angela Markado	Jack		
2016	Ma' Rosa	Jackson		
2017	Dark Is the Night	Alan		
2018	Pan de Salawal	Brando		
2019	Babae at Baril	Male colleague		
2019	Write about Love	Chad		
2022	Secrets	Leo		
2022	Pabuya	Jojo		
