= Shake, Rattle and Roll 9 =

2007 Filipino film

- Theatrical release poster
- Directed by: Paul Y. Daza (segment Christmas Tree); Michael Tuviera (segment Bangungot); Topel Lee (segment Engkanto)
- Screenplay by: Enzo Valdez (segment Christmas Tree); Paul Daza (segment Christmas Tree); Fairlane Raymundo (segments Christmas Tree, Bangungot and Engkanto); Roselle Monteverde-Teo (segments Bangungot and Engkanto); Michael Tuviera (segment Bangungot); Venjie Pellena (segment Bangungot); Andrew Paredes (segment Engkanto)
- Story by: Enzo Valdez (segment Christmas Tree); Paul Daza (segment Christmas Tree); Fairlane Raymundo (segments Christmas Tree, Bangungot and Engkanto); Roselle Monteverde-Teo (segments Bangungot and Engkanto); Venjie Pellena (segment Bangungot); Andrew Paredes (segment Engkanto)
- Produced by: Roselle Monteverde-Teo; Lily Y. Monteverde
- Starring: John Prats; Pauleen Luna; Katrina Halili; Roxanne Guinoo; Lovi Poe; Matt Evans; Melissa Ricks; Mart Escudero; Jewel Mische; Felix Roco; Nash Aguas; Sam Concepcion; Eugene Domingo; Dennis Trillo
- Cinematography: Eli Balce (segment Bangungot); Louie Quirino (segments Christmas Tree and Engkanto)
- Edited by: Ria de Guzman (segment Christmas Tree); Joseph Samala (segment Bangungot); Michael Tuviera (segment Bangungot)
- Music by: Von de Guzman
- Production companies: Regal Entertainment; Regal Multimedia Inc.
- Release date: December 25, 2007
- Running time: 138 minutes
- Country: Philippines
- Language: Filipino

Shake, Rattle and Roll 9 (titled onscreen as Shake Rattle & Roll 9) is a 2007 Filipino horror anthology film produced and distributed by Regal Entertainment, and the ninth installment of the Shake, Rattle & Roll film series, following the eighth film in 2006. It is also an entry to the 2007 Metro Manila Film Festival.

The film has three segments: a grieving family spending Christmas at their grandmother's house is stalked by a monstrous Christmas tree; a desperate woman performs a ritual that traps herself and her lover in each other's nightmares; and a gothic band becomes lost in the woods and encounters an engkanto.

The tenth installment, Shake, Rattle & Roll X, was released in 2008.

== Plot ==
=== "Christmas Tree" ===
Stephen, his mother Myrna, and his two sisters Hazel and Eunice visit their grandmother Susana for Christmas. During the long journey, Stephen has a nightmare concerning his deceased father Chuck. Upon their arrival, a relative, Jong, erects a tall Christmas tree that was found in the Amazon rainforest, which the family decorates. However, during a night stroll, Stephen notices Elton John, Jong's parrot is missing, while Eunice's stuffed toy giraffe, Gordon, is found shredded to pieces. Their nanny Sonny wonders why the tree keeps getting taller.

After a Christmas feast, the family goes to sleep. However, Sonny is suddenly eaten by the Tree while trying to add more decorations. Stephen, having heard the commotion downstairs, wakes up Hazel to investigate. Jong also arrives at the scene and the three witness the transformation of the Christmas Tree, caused by a monstrous tree dwelling within the leaves of the Tree itself. Before they could run, Jong is knocked out by the monster. Hazel and Stephen race to their mother's room, narrating them that the Christmas Tree came to life. Myrna dismisses Stephen's story and peers outside, only to encounter the Tree. Myrna warns Susana to stay in the room, while Hazel and Stephen make a diversion, tripping the Christmas Tree.

Hazel and Stephen rush to the kitchen, while Susana, Myrna, and Eunice escape. Hazel finds acid in the kitchen, which Stephen throws into the mouth of the Tree, killing it.

=== "Bangungot" ===
Marionne goes on a date with Jerome at an amusement park. However, a mysterious woman warns Marionne not to sleep otherwise she will die. Before the woman can exit the park, a red cloaked figure strangles her to death.

In her dorm, Marionne wakes startlingly, realizing it was a dream. Her officemate Tatin then sees her drawing a picture of the red-cloaked figure that strangled the woman in her dream. She recalls that her grandfather died of a bangungot (nightmare), which Tatin dismisses. Marionne, concerned about her grandfather's past, unlocks the latter's room. Shortly after setting foot, eerie things fly in the air.

The young woman was revealed to be a candle saleslady. She and Tatin have been friends. One day, her brother Tonton and a handsome man, revealed to be Jerome, arrive at the shop. The latter informs them that he will be away for a week; shockingly, he was engaged to a woman named Florence, a fact that Marionne became jealous of.

Later on, a young girl wants to order a large candle. Marionne notices the strange-looking parchment with strange words written in ink. She asks the girl's purpose for the candle. The latter said that: "if you want to dream of your love ones, and him to you", she must light the candle before sleeping, and chant the words in the parchment. But she must wake up before the candle is consumed otherwise she cannot leave the dream.

Eager to try this, Marionne kept the parchment and did as the girl said. After the ritual was performed, eerie events began to manifest to Jerome and Marionne. The red-cloaked figure reappears and tries to strangle the two, but they dismiss the event as a hallucination. Late at night, Marionne visits Jerome in the office, complaining about insomnia. She and Jerome begin to hallucinate again: the phantom reappears and tries to strangle them again. As they comfort each other, Florence appears. Shocked by what she sees, she too is nearly strangled by the phantom but is comforted by Jerome. Seeing this, Marionne chases the two. Jerome and Florence walk out of the shop, finally ending up at the peak of an overpass. Florence stumbles and the phantom reappears, this time, Jerome confronts it and they both jump off the overpass, with that being revealed to be Florence's own dream.

Marionne, having witnessed the events, enters the hospital, where she realizes the shocking truth: she and Jerome entered a near-death state already after the spell was performed; this explains why Tonton, Florence and Tatin could not feel Marionne's presence. Florence and Tatin tell them everything, while Marionne sees herself performing the spell and then apparently dropping dead. Tatin shook and jerked her up but she would not respond. Florence's story matched Tatin's: the former found her fiancé hunched over a table in the candle shop but he was on the brink of death in his sleep.

Another thing is: Marionne's grandfather did not die of a nightmare but of a heart attack, and everything that had happened after the spell was performed had been Marionne's nightmare. Jerome on the other hand dreams about Marionne hugging him very tightly; it was revealed that the cloaked figure was Marionne all along. As Marionne and Jerome realize this, Florence cries and begs Jerome to wake up. Jerome tries his best, but Marionne holds him down, determined to spend eternity with the man she loves, but does not love her back. Marionne and Jerome both die, with Jerome dying first.

=== "Engkanto" ===
A teenage gothic band heads out for a gig in a remote province. During the long journey, not many of the young band members strike up a conversation, while, their manager Hans keeps complaining why he's the one who should drive. Meanwhile, Tonee and Ian, who were a long-estranged couple, ignored each other. Vince, the band's leader and Richard have a small fight, only to be stopped by Vince's ex-girlfriend Dang.

The group stops by a small store beside the road. The others decide to relax while Vince and Dang disappear from view. Vince reveals he will be leaving them soon, a fact that Dang objects strongly.

Back at the store, Lucio warns them to stay in sight, for they might be kidnapped by an engkanto. He then tells of the story of his son Paeng, who was gathering firewood when he was abducted. He then also explains that the engkanto was the reason why they were lost in the middle of nowhere.

The bus runs out of gas, forcing the band to take refuge in an abandoned resort. Dang, Ian and Tonee then encounter a young and beautiful woman clad in white. Tonee and Ian ask her where is the beach. They follow the woman's directions but get lost. Tonee loses her temper but Ian wants to court the young woman. He is then bitten by the woman, who is revealed to be the engkanto.

Vince then encounters Paeng. He, Dang and Richard demand who did this to him and who is this. As they speak, the engkanto summons her slaves to hunt the band down. Hans, who was looking for gas, gets bitten. Meanwhile, Dang meets Tonee informing the former that Ian was killed by the engkanto and was made into her slave. Suddenly, Tonee is choked to death.

Paeng and Vince then lure the slaves to the beach, discovering they fear water. They hatch a plan: he and Dang will ward off the slaves while Paeng, Richard and Tikoy refuel the bus. Paeng then notices the tree beside them which they realize to be the engkanto's lair. They must burn it to kill the engkanto.

The engkanto, stopped in her tracks for she fears water, rushes to Richard and chokes him. Richard hears that she is the one she needs. Meanwhile, Paeng tossed the matches in the air, burning the tree and killing the engkanto.

The remaining band members visit Paeng's home where his father warmly welcomes him. But Lucio informs them that destroying an engkanto's home will not kill her, but only leave her temporarily homeless. She will only move into a new dwelling, for she is a spirit of nature. Mang Lucio was right: Richard was kidnapped by the reanimated engkanto and was never seen again. The next day in the resort, the surviving slave of the engkanto, that was hidden in a box, was revealed to have survived.

== Cast ==
=== Christmas Tree ===
- Nash Aguas as Stephen
- Lovi Poe as Hazel
- John Prats as Jong
- Gina Alajar as Myrna
- Boots Anson-Roa as Lola Susana
- Tonton Gutierrez as Chuck
- John Lapus as Yaya Sonny
- Sophia Marie Baars as Eunice

=== Bangungot ===
- Dennis Trillo as Jerome
- Pauleen Luna as Florence
- Roxanne Guinoo as Marionne/Red-Cloaked Figure
- Jaymee Joaquin as Tatin
- Jayson Gainza as Tonton
- Andrea Torres as Schoolgirl
- Eugene Domingo as Woman
- Barbie Forteza as Young Marionne

=== Engkanto ===
- Katrina Halili as Engkanto
- Matt Evans as Richard
- Melissa Ricks as Dang
- Mart Escudero as Vince
- Jewel Mische as Tonee
- Sam Concepcion as Paeng
- Felix Roco as Ian
- Jojo Alejar as Hans
- Nanding Josef as Lucio
- Hector Macaso as Tikoy

== Accolades ==
Year	Award-Giving Body	Category	Recipient	Result
2007	33rd Metro Manila Film Festival	Best Child Performer	Nash Aguas	Won
2007	33rd Metro Manila Film Festival	People's Choice for Best Picture	Shake, Rattle and Roll 9	Nominated
2007	33rd Metro Manila Film Festival	People's Choice for Best Director	Paul Daza	Nominated
2007	33rd Metro Manila Film Festival	People's Choice for Best Float	Shake, Rattle and Roll 9	Nominated
2007	24th PMPC Star Awards for Movies	New Movie of the Year	Lovi Poe	Won

== See also ==
- Shake, Rattle & Roll (film series)
- List of ghost films
