= Love Spell =

2006–08 Philippine television fantasy drama series

- Created by: ABS-CBN Corporation
- Directed by: Various
- Starring: Various Artists
- Opening theme: "Mahiwagang Pag-ibig", by Aldred Gatchalian (July 2006–January 2008)
- Country of origin: Philippines
- Original language: Filipino
- No. of episodes: 86

Production
- Running time: 60 minutes

Original release
- Network: ABS-CBN
- Release: July 9, 2006 – March 23, 2008

Love Spell is a Philippine fantasy and romance-based program airing on ABS-CBN that tells a different love story each season with a new couple. It was aired from July 9, 2006, to March 23, 2008.

This series was streaming on Jeepney TV YouTube Channel.

== Episodes ==
=== Season 1 ===
==== My Boy, My Girl ====
Starring
Kim Chiu and Gerald Anderson
Also starring:

Eugene Domingo, Christian Vasquez, Quintin Alianza, Isabel Blaesi

Plot
This the story of Stephanie (Kim Chiu), a girl who longs to be the center of attention. With busy parents and a brother that’s the apple of everyone’s eye, Stephanie tries to get into the mean girls clique of Rea (Isabel Blaesi). But popularity always comes with a price, and in order for her to belong into the in crowd and get the mean girl necklace she has to get herself a trophy boyfriend. Along comes exchange student Simon (Gerald Anderson) the perfect boy toy and soon he becomes head over heels in love with Stephanie. But when her ex-best friend Joy (Mikki Arceo) finds out the truth, all hell breaks loose and Simon curses Stephanie because of her cruelty. When Stephanie wakes up the next day, she's terrified finding a boy looking back at her in the mirror. Will Manong (Budoy Marabiles), a known albularyo, be able to help Stephanie out of her dilemma? Or is she stuck being Stephen forever?

==== Wanted: Mr. Perfect ====
Starring
Anne Curtis and Zanjoe Marudo
Also starring:

Franzen Fajardo, Rico Barrera, Matt Evans, Olyn Membian, and Ms. Gina Pareño

Plot
This is the confusing tale of Rowena (Anne), an art gallery owner, who is very idealistic when it comes to matters of the heart. She then meets Frank (Franzen) the canteen employee, Rowena’s admirer from afar. He hopes that someday the artist might see him in a different way. His wish was fulfilled when his brother’s experimental love potion accidentally gets into Rowena’s hands. Each time she drinks the gayuma, all Rowena could see is Frank, who transforms into Franco (Zanjoe), the man of her dreams. Everyone else around her cannot seem to comprehend what she saw in the awkward canteen boy hanging on her arm. How long can Frank keep this pretense up? Will Rowena still like him if she finds out the truth?

==== Charm & Crystal ====
Starring
Kim Chiu, Gerald Anderson, Shaina Magdayao and Rayver Cruz
Also starring:

Carmi Martin, Hazel Ann Mendoza, Lloyd Samartino, Bart Guingona and Ronnie Lazaro

Plot
Set against the backdrop of a high school musical, Charm (Shaina) and Crystal (Kim) are best friends. Crystal is the confident production designer while Charm is the awkward stagehand who spends her time just wishing, instead of doing something, to be near her crush Nookie (Gerald), the cute lead guy in their show. Crystal, however, does not approve of her best friend's choice but eventually, love will have a funny way of changing her mind. Meanwhile, by some twist of fate, Charm chances upon Johnny the Genie (Rayver) and Crystal ends up with Nookie. Through this 100-year-old fresh-faced genie, her wishes do not just bring her good voice, but love, as well.

=== Season 2 ===
==== Home Switch Home ====
Starring
Maja Salvador, Jason Abalos, Jake Cuenca and Angelica Panganiban
Also starring:

Bing Loyzaga, Yayo Aguila, Frank Garcia, Basty Alcanses, Shamaine Centenera, Kakai Bautista, and Tuesday Vargas

Plot
Opposite personalities, different lives, Princess (Angelica) and Shine (Maja) get the shock of their lives once they opened their eyes after blowing out the candles on their birthday cakes. Princess, the rich girl steps into the shoes of Shine, the quek-quek vendor and vice versa. Through their confusion, four gorgeous boys will help them sort their lives out: Sylvester (Jason Abalos), Princess’ consistent suitor; TJ (John Wayne Sace), Princess’ good-hearted gardener; Juano (Jake Cuenca), Shine is barumbado neighbor and Matoy (Frank Garcia), Shine’s security guard ex-boyfriend. Living in each other’s world not only make Princess and Shine appreciate life’s lessons more, they will discover that their lives are actually intertwined. But will they be able to go back to their original selves or are they stuck forever in the switch?

==== Pasko Na, Santa Ko ====
Starring
Vhong Navarro, Ai Ai delas Alas, Kim Chiu, Gerald Anderson, Matt Evans
Plot
Crisanta (Ai-Ai), a modern day scrooge, and Donato’s (Vhong) bitter lady boss. Hard working Donato is not the lone victim of Crisanta’s bad attitude though, the other employees in the toy store quake in fear at the sight of her. Her daughters, Abby (Kim) and Maria (Olyn), get treated the same. The two cannot stand her manipulating ways. So Donato’s brothers Ryan (Gerald) and Paolo (Matt) connived to take revenge on Crisanta by courting her daughters and breaking their hearts. But the youngest, Boni (Jairus Aquino), wishes that his Kuya’s boss turn into a better person. Santa hears the good little boy’s wish and grants it, inspiring a chain of hilarious and surprise-filled events.

==== Line To Heaven ====
Starring
Joross Gamboa and Roxanne Guinoo
Also starring:

Juan Rodrigo, Melanie Marquez, Brenda Fox, Joaqui Mendoza, and Gloria Diaz

Plot
Nikki (Roxanne), a rich and rebellious girl, whose life is overly protected by her parents. One day, she runs away because of her family’s dislike for Kyle, her punk boyfriend. On board a bus, she meets Raffy (Joross) the geek. Raffy tries to impress the pretty lady but his antics just irritated Nikki to no end. However, even before Raffy can fully get on her nerves, a tragedy takes place, triggering a series of events that prove that love really conquers all – even death.

=== Season 3 ===
==== Click Na Click ====
Starring
Kristine Hermosa, Diether Ocampo and Precious Lara Quigaman
Also starring:

Pooh, Eda Nolan, Joem Bascon

Plot
Love is definitely all about magic, whether it's that funny, tingly sensation you get whenever you see your loved one, or a magic camera that lets you see your destiny. Wena (Kristine), a photographer from Cebu, who gets whisked to a studio in Manila thanks to her production intern sister, Cali (Eda Nolan). There, she meets celebrity idol Josh (Deither) taping for a show. Starstruck, she takes pictures of him, distracting the director and causing him to throw Wena's camera to the ground. Desperate, Wena goes to a repair shop, bumping into a mysterious old lady named Galea. The latter gives Wena an old camera, which turns out to be something more than just a contraption for taking pictures, as it changes Wena and her sister's destiny, along with Josh's, his brother (Joem Bascon), and his fiancee's (Precious Lara Quigaman) as well. Ultimately, will this magic camera be the key to Wena's one true love?

==== Shoes Ko Po, Shoes Ko 'Day! ====
Starring
Maja Salvador, John Prats, Shaina Magdayao and Rayver Cruz
Also starring:

Cheena, Pokwang, Amy Perez, Jason Gainza

Plot
Sisters Joanne (Shaina Magdayao) and Dianne (Maja Salvador), two snobs who seemingly idolize Nicole Ritchie and Paris Hilton. They know they got everything: a luxurious and carefree life, a pretty face and the talent to make it big in the dance floor. Unfortunately, they also know how to flaunt it, never giving "mere mortals" the time of the day. A fairy named Kelly (Tess Antonio) disguises herself as a beauty-deprived party girl one day, and experiences how naughty the two sisters are when she tries to befriend them. Due to this, she takes their beauty away from them, sealing it in a pair of enchanted shoes that will become their sole access to beauty and love. What will happen when our dancing belles turn into ugly ducklings?

==== Barbi-Cute ====
Starring
Toni Gonzaga and Zanjoe Marudo
Also starring:

Nancy Castiglione, Empress Schuck and Kristoff Abrenica

Plot
No doubt, love lets us experience lots of things we never dreamt of experiencing. There are times when impossible feats are achieved just because of love. But what if a lightning strikes makes a mannequin come to life? Will you still be able to lay your love down for that? Meet snooty model Rachel (Nancy Castiglione) who one day, offers the lowly janitor Luke (Zanjoe) a date. However, she asked him out not because she likes him, but because she had a sick joke in mind: she dressed up a mannequin to look like her, in order to make Luke realize that they can never be together. Just as Luke was starting to feel sorry for himself, lightning strikes, and the mannequin comes to life. As such, Luke takes home the mannequin, names her Barbi (Toni), and takes care of her all the time. Soon, Barbie starts to have feelings towards Luke. However, there is just one problem: she is not a real person.

=== Season 4 ===
==== Sweet Sixty ====
Starring
Sarah Geronimo and Oyo Boy Sotto
Also starring:

Gina Pareño, Roxanne Guinoo and Jake Cuenca

Plot
They say that you only live once, so better make the most out of it. After all, not all of us are given a second chance, so it does seem prudent to cherish every minute we've got, and live life to the fullest.
Meet the sixty-year-old Doña Rosing (Gina Pareño), who never seems to run out of conflicts with her liberated granddaughter, Anna (Roxanne Guinoo). After one of their fights, Doña Rosing goes to her yard to tend to her flowers. There, she gets spotted by Bong (Oyo Boy Sotto), who ends up giving her a magical rose. Soon, Doña Rosing accidentally sheds a tear on the rose, which unexpectedly transforms her into a young lady (Sarah Geronimo). Shocked, Doña Rosing names herself Rose, and enjoys life with her new-found youth and vigor, much to the frustration of her granddaughter.

==== Ellay Enchanted ====
Starring
Jericho Rosales and Iya Villania
Also starring:

Eugene Domingo, Candy Pangilinan, DJ Durano, Dino Imperial, Princess Ryan, Madame Auring and Andoy Ranay

Plot
Elloy (played by Jericho Rosales) is a dashing one man that never fails to sweep thousands of girls off their feet. Also blessed with a wonderful singing voice, he is also his band's vocalist, making girls fall for him more. However, despite the attention lavished upon him by his admirers, he just plays around with girls, and treats them as if they were just his own toys: he collects them as if they're just mere items for display.
Gil (DJ Durano), one of Elloy's bandmates, has a sister named Mayette (Candy Pangilinan), who is terribly smitten at Elloy. However, Mayette ends up as one of Elloy's girls, and feeling rejected, she turns to her aunt, Madame Keller, who knows a thing or two on casting spells. Gil, Mayette and Madame Keller then unite their forces to teach Elloy a lesson, by turning him into a full-fledged woman. Also, the spell backfires, and Madame Keller turns into a man herself. The only way to reverse the spell is to make a fellow woman fall in love with Elloy's current state: as a woman herself.

==== My Soulfone ====
Starring
Sam Milby and Angelica Panganiban
Also starring:

Robert Woods, Saicy Aguila, Helga Krapf, Jiro Manio, Caroline Riggs and Malou de Guzman

Plot
The rebellious and US-bred Andrew (Sam Milby) goes back to the Philippines to honor his father's dying wish: he must personally hand an envelope to his biological mother (Malou de Guzman). Things start to get fishy when he gets to the Philippines, and he discovers that his biological mother is actually a poor laundrywoman who is now a mother of two sons. What is more strange is that the cellphone he inherits from his father turns out to be magical because it shows videos of the future. To add to his confusion, he discovers the contents of the envelope his dad gave him, and he gets more determined to find out why his dad wanted her to have this money and why mom did not follow him and his dad to America.
While he tries to sort everything out, he bumps into Wena (Angelica Panganiban), a nursing student who disobeys everything her mother says. What will happen when Andrew finally meets his match? Will it be a clash of the titans, or will the two end up falling in love? Also, what is the mystery behind the magical cellphone?

=== Season 5 ===
==== Bumalaka, Bulalakaw, Boom! ====
Starring
Gee-Ann Abrahan, Mickey Perz and Bodie Cruz
Also starring:

Tirso Cruz III, Jaclyn Jose, Charee Pineda, Pia Moran, Kathleen Aguilar and Joshua Dionisio

Plot
Childhood friends, Nina (Gee-Ann) and Carlo (Mickey) are dance partners who both dream of stardom. But an unfortunate fire accident will change the course of their lives. Carlo will be crippled, hence unable to dance anymore, while Nina will end up a backup for a popular dancing pair. Dominic (Bodie) witness a meteor crash, and she wi?, the one-half of the dancing pair, wants to quit showbiz and pursue a career in surgery instead. Dominic's only problem is that his father is keeping him from doing what he truly wants. Then one night, Nina will have telekinetic powers.
Because of her secret love for Carlo, Nina will use her powers to cure her friend's injury so he can pursue his dreams of dancing. But will this help Carlo realize that Nina is the girl for him, or will Nina find another guy who will love her even without her uncanny abilities?

==== Hairy Harry ====
Starring
Matt Evans and Melissa Ricks
Also starring:

Aaron Junatas, Sharlene San Pedro, Tetchie Agbayani, Efren Reyes Jr., Puma de Borja, Mario Magalona and Frances Ignacio

Plot
In Love Spell presents Hairy Harry, Matt will play a dog lover named Harry who also works as a dog trainer. Meanwhile, Melissa will play Sally, one of Harry's clients and apparently, his long-time crush. The two will get along well despite the presence of Sally's insecure and persistent admirer. But as Harry and Sally begin to fall for each other, Harry will wake up one night transformed into a dog! He will later learn about their family's curse, that he should not fall in love or else, he will turn into a dog upon sunset and will only return to human form during sunrise. Harry and Sally will soon both realize how hard it is to handle "puppy" love, especially if it is of a different kind.

==== Cindy-rella ====

Starring
Kim Chiu and Gerald Anderson
Also starring:

Sheryl Cruz, John James Uy, Pilita Corrales, Jackie Lou Blanco, Andrew E., Sheryn Regis, Ashley Gruenberg, Kiray Celis and Mara Lopez

Plot
Cindy-rella begins in the fairy tale world, where Prince William (John James Uy) is celebrating his 21st birthday. His uncle invites all the ladies in the kingdom to a ball, hoping to find a wife for his nephew. Among those invited is the pretty, kindhearted Cindy-rella (Kim Chiu), but on the night of the ball, her evil stepsisters and stepmother (Sheryl Cruz) tear her clothes and lock her in the basement. Cindy-rella's fairy godmother (Sheryn Regis) comes to the rescue and enables her to go to the ball in a fancy dress and carriage, but she warns that Cindy-rella should be home by midnight or she'll be caught back in her usual filthy clothes. The story goes on until after the prince chooses Cindy as his dancing partner. Her wicked family grows envious and throws her into a well, which links the fairytale world and the real world. The poor lass comes into the real world unconscious; fortunately, she is saved by a modern-day prince charming, Albert (Gerald Anderson). He falls in love with her, so he helps Cindy-rella survive in the real world. But can they be together when they belong to different worlds? Will Cindy choose Albert, a normal human being, over a dashing prince in the fairytale realm? Will there be a happy ending for Cindy-rella?

=== Season 6 ===
After "Cindyrella", the show reformatted as a weekly suspense-romance anthology from January–March 2008 changing parts with Your Song having seasonal episodes

==== Face Shop ====
Starring
Anne Curtis, Valerie Concepcion and Geoff Eigenman
Plot
Pearl (Valerie Concepcion) is a beautiful college student who loves to party, obsessed with the way she looks and is very self-centered. Because she is also so possessive of her boyfriend Alvin (Geoff Eigenmann), she gets jealous when it comes to other girls in the campus. She is also jealous of her sister, who had died, unlike her sister, she thinks that she can never meet up to her mother's expectations, and that her mother will never like her as much. Her maid Rina (Tess Antonio) is the exact opposite of Pearl — she is not very pretty, and she always wanted to be like Pearl and envied her, but she can also be a kind person.
The complication began when Pearl's car got stuck right in front of a Face shop, where one can choose and buy another face she did not have any second thoughts into buying a new face (Anne Curtis) which she thought would bring her happiness and contentment. But unknown to her, Pearl’s life with her family and her boyfriend, become even more complicated. Pearl thought her life was going to be all perfect-until she finds out that someone was wearing her face, pretending to be Pearl, and took her place. Having her boyfriend, family, and identity stolen, Pearl is devastated and became miserable. However, Pearl became famous when she was made an international model, known to have one of the most beautiful faces in the world. She instantly becomes rich, but will she ever realize the real key to happiness?
All was fine, until Pearl met the person who stole her face again. She asks to meet her mother and apologise, only to find out her boyfriend is getting married! Pearl realizes that the only way to bring her boyfriend and her life back is if she can get her old face.
As Pearl realizes her mistakes, will she be able to get back her old beautiful face and the happiness that she wants?

==== Elevator ====
Starring
Mariel Rodriguez, Zanjoe Marudo and Jon Avila
Plot
Mia is devastated when her former love Miguel marries another woman. Despite being a successful magazine editor, Mia is unhappy with her love life with Jim, a simple and boring gym instructor. One night, Mia takes a magical elevator which brings her back to three years ago.
Three years ago, Mia turned down Miguel's marriage proposal to pursue her career and be with Jim who at that time was still her secret lover. Having the chance to redo her choices, Mia breaks up with Jim and agrees to marry Miguel. But the next day, she again takes the elevator on her way to the ground floor lobby. Three years passed by and Mia has become a wasted wife. In the lobby, she runs into Miguel with their two kids. Miguel leaves the children in her care. Later did Mia realize that she is already separated from Miguel and that she is still working as an assistant editor. Jim, on the other hand, is now a famous model.
Regretting her choice, Mia again takes the elevator back to five years ago when she first met Jim. She then becomes happy with Jim, but wanting to make sure if she made the right decision, she tells the elevator man to take her into the present. Mia finds herself in a wedding dress and she sees Jim in a barong waiting for her in the lobby. As they make it to their wedding, Mia is shocked to see that Jim has lost his right leg, and because the amputation was so expensive, they still owe some bills in the hospital.
Mia becomes frantic and forces the elevator man to take her back to six years ago. The man forbids her from abusing the power of the elevator, but Mia accidentally presses 23 on the elevator. She is then taken back 23 years in the past, and Mia shrinks into a baby. The building suddenly disappears, and the mysterious elevator man takes baby Mia in his arms.

==== The Bet ====
Starring
Megan Young, Baron Geisler and Will Devaughn

==== Play Boy ====
Starring
Rafael Rosell, Riza Santos and Valeen Montenegro/ Lacer Esteban
Plot
Rafael Rosell plays a play boy whose 3 hot sexy girlfriends voodoo him which all have one thing in common.

==== Credit Card ====
Starring
Nikki Gil, Joem Bascon, Carla Humphries
Plot
A shopaholic to the bones, Aileen is a fan of every bargain sale and an owner of several credit cards. One day in the mall, she chances upon a singing promo man who offers her a magical credit card. Unable to resist the temptation, Aileen signs up for a new credit card much to objection of her boyfriend, Obet. Upon receiving her new credit card, Aileen goes on a shopping rampage. From then on, she spends most of her time in the malls rather than with Obet and her best friend, Jinky.
One night after coming home from a shopping spree, Aileen gets mugged. Obet immediately comes to her rescue, but he gets shot instead. The next day, Obet breaks up with Aileen as he can no longer put up with her being materialistic. She later finds out, though, that Obet and Jinky are having a relationship. Aileen is devastated, and when she receives her billing statement from the credit card company, she learns that every purchase she made through the magical credit card cost her all her loved ones and values. With no friends and loved ones, Aileen ends up losing her sanity.

==== Magic Trick ====
Starring
Roxanne Guinoo, Ruben Gonzaga, Jhong Hilario

==== Bato ====
Starring
Lauren Young, AJ Perez and Helga Krapf
Plot
A girl named Irish (Lauren Young), who lives with her strict mom, who does not want her to have a boyfriend. She has a friend who is supportive and kind to her. Irish was jealous of her friend because she leads a beautiful life and has a boyfriend, who is kind, helpful, and is in love with her friend. Unlike her, Irish's boyfriend (AJ Perez) who is a playboy. She wants to change her life to a better one.
One day, she went to the river because she has a test at her school, she did not study her lessons and reviews. She saw a woman, the woman looked like an old witch, in a scary dress. The old woman has yellow stones and the stones were magical. The old woman gave the stones to her and said that you will throw the stone to the river and your wish will come true. She tried throwing it, the morning after, her wish came true. She went again to the river and took two stones. She made a wish again that her mom will not be strict anymore and she also wanted her friend's mom to become strict. She threw it to her friend's mom, so she and her boyfriend can go to her house.
One night, she and her friend was walking when she saw that her boyfriend drove with another girl. She cried and wished her boyfriend will become good and truthful like her friend's boyfriend. She went to her school and she saw her friend's boyfriend then she threw a stone to the head of her friend's boyfriend.
The next day, her boyfriend told her that his father became crazy and he cannot remember everything. He and his father will go the US for his father's therapy. Irish did not want him to leave her. She went to the river and got a stone, but the stone were not there. The woman did not like what she was doing. The woman gave her a chance. She wished that her boyfriend's father would not become sick anymore. She threw it to the river, but the stone hit a big rock and came back to her. She became crazy and did not remember anything. Her mom, boyfriend, and friend became worried about her.

==== Lies ====
Starring
Precious Lara Quigaman, Derek Ramsay and Nash Aguas
Plot
Derek Ramsay stars as Larry, a man who likes lying just to get excuses, until his girlfriend—played by Lara Quigaman receives a gift from him - a teddy bear.
Larry's girlfriend makes a wish that all of Larry's lies comes true. Even if it costs the lives of his friends and families.

==== Double ====
Starring
Jason Abalos and Denise Laurel

==== Taxi ====
Starring
Iya Villania and AJ Dee
Plot
Iya Villania plays a smart woman who is a party girl.

==== Game ====
Starring
John Prats and Erich Gonzales
Plot
In this series finale, John Prats plays a video game addict. John Prats falls in love with Erich Gonzales when she (Erich) defeated him on that certain video game. Prats courts Gonzales but was rejected because he was game addicted. Prats soon finds out that Gonzales is hanging out with another boy and it made him jealous, so he together with his friend who is also game addicted went off acting and dressed like war freaks going to attack Gonzales and the guy she is hanging out with.

== Award ==
- 2007 PMPC Star Awards for TV "Best Weekly-Daytime Drama Series"
