= Jim Fernandez's Kambal sa Uma =

2009 Philippine television series

- Title card
- Genre: Drama; Fantasy; Horror; Suspense; Mystery; Romance; Thriller
- Created by: ABS-CBN Studios; Jim Fernandez; Ernie Santiago
- Based on: Kambal sa Uma by Jim Fernandez; Kambal sa Uma (1979) by Joey Gosiengfiao
- Developed by: ABS-CBN Studios
- Directed by: Manny Q. Palo; Rechie A. del Carmen
- Starring: Melissa Ricks; Shaina Magdayao; Matt Evans; Jason Abalos; Gina Alajar
- Theme music composer: Vehnee Saturno
- Opening theme: "Kung Iniibig Ka Niya" by Laarni Lozada
- Composer: Vince de Jesus
- Country of origin: Philippines
- Original language: Filipino
- No. of episodes: 125

Production
- Executive producers: Carlo Katigbak; Cory Vidanes; Laurenti Dyogi; Roldeo Endrinal
- Producer: Carlina D. Dela Merced
- Editors: Christie Ang; Leogin Nayre; Rommel Malimban; Jake Maderazo
- Running time: 30-45 minutes
- Production company: Dreamscape Entertainment Television

Original release
- Network: ABS-CBN
- Release: April 20 – October 9, 2009

Kambal sa Uma (International Name: The Rat Sisters /transl. Twins in the Farm) is a 2009 Philippine television drama fantasy series broadcast by ABS-CBN. The series is based on a 1979 Philippine film of the same title. Directed by Manny Q. Palo and Rechie A. del Carmen, it stars Melissa Ricks, Shaina Magdayao, Matt Evans, Jason Abalos and Gina Alajar. It aired on the network's Hapontastic line up and worldwide on TFC from April 20 to October 9, 2009, replacing Parekoy and was replaced by Nagsimula sa Puso. Throughout its run, Kambal sa Uma was a top-rating afternoon drama television series.

== Overview ==
=== Comics ===
Kambal sa Uma is a comics creation by Jim Fernandez and Ernie Santiago. Its tells a story of twin sisters who both have different characteristics of a rat. Ella, have adapted the characteristics of the rats facial appearance while Vira only managed to gain the hairs on her back.

=== 1979 film ===
The comics was adapted into a film in the 1970s directed by Joey Gosiengfiao. It starred Rio Locsin who played both Ella and Vira; Rio Locsin now portrays Ella and Vira's mother, Milagros in the TV remake. It also starred Al Tantay, Dennis Roldan, Orestes Ojeda, Julie Ann Fortich, and Isabel Rivas.

== Premise ==
Based on the komiks creation of Jim Fernandez and Ernie Santiago and the 1970s film by Joey Gosiengfiao, Kambal Sa Uma tells the story of Ella (Melissa Ricks) and Vira (Shaina Magdayao), twin sisters who have some of the physical features of a rodent. When she was still a baby, Vira was given away by her mother Milagros (Rio Locsin) and ended up in the care of a rich couple in the city. Meanwhile, Ella remained with her mother and lived in the mountains away from persecution of people. Through a dramatic course of events, Ella and Vira will cross paths and their differences will lead to a bitter clash.

== Cast and characters ==
=== Main cast ===
- Melissa Ricks as Venus dela Riva / Ella Perea
- Shaina Magdayao as Vira Mae Ocampo / Marie Perea

=== Supporting cast ===
- Matt Evans as Gabriel "Gab" Ledesma
- Jason Abalos as Dino San Jose
- Rio Locsin as Milagros Perea
- Gina Alajar as Celeste Miranda-Ledesma
- Lotlot de Leon as Lourdes Ledesma-Ocampo
- Carmi Martin as Lolita dela Riva
- Allan Paule as Aurelio Ocampo
- Carl Guevara as Benjie San Jose
- Jordan Herrera as Leon
- Bangs Garcia as Ynez Ocampo
- Aldred Gatchalian as Emil Ledesma

=== Minor cast ===
- Nonie Buencamino as Raul Perea Sr.
- Bing Davao as Fernando "Fernan" Ledesma
- Eva Darren as Lola Salve
- Dianne Medina as Kat
- Nathalie Hart as Myka
- Sergio Garcia as Edward
- Helga Krapf as Mary

=== Special participation ===
- Paul Salas as young Dino San Jose
- Mark Joshua Salvador as young Gabriel "Gab" Ledesma
- Angel Sy as young Ella Perea
- Nikki Bagaporo as young Ynez Ocampo
- Mika dela Cruz as young Vira Mae Ocampo / Marie Perea
- Joross Gamboa as young Raul Perea Sr.
- Dimples Romana as young Milagros Perea
- Desiree del Valle as young Celeste Miranda-Ledesma
- Cheska Billiones as young Lourdes Ocampo
- Baron Geisler as young Aurelio Ocampo

== Re-run ==
Kambal sa Uma aired re-runs on Jeepney TV from May 26 to September 19, 2014; December 4, 2017 to March 30, 2018; March 25 to July 19, 2019; October 21, 2024 to April 11, 2025; and February 16 to May 15, 2026.

== See also ==
- List of programs broadcast by ABS-CBN
- List of ABS-CBN Studios original drama series
