= John Prats =

Filipino director and former actor (born 1984)

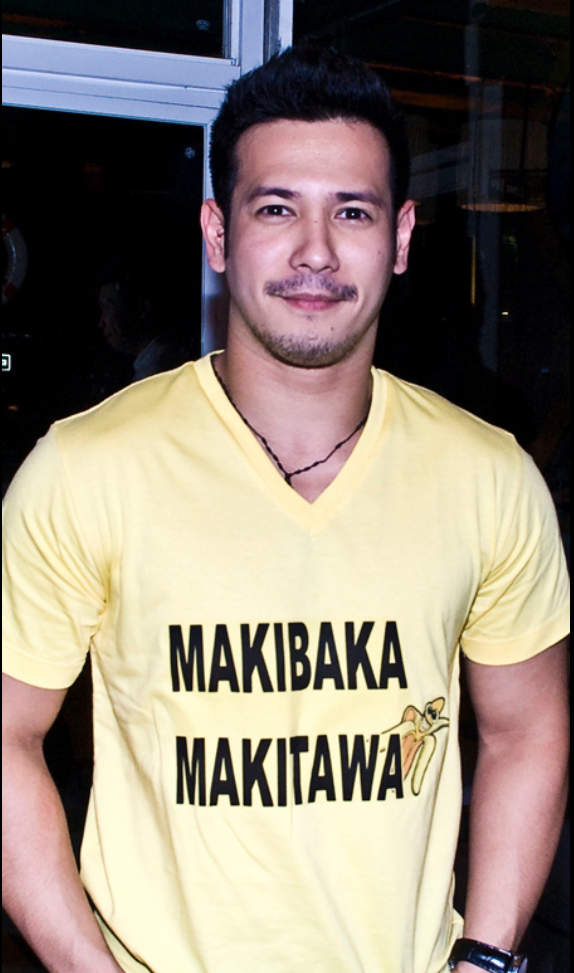
- Prats in 2013
- Born: John Paulo Quiambao Prats; February 14, 1984 (age 42); Manila, Philippines
- Other names: Praty, JP
- Education: Thames International Business School, (Business management)
- Occupations: Director; model; entrepreneur; actor (former)
- Years active: 1992–2022 (actor); 2017–present (director)
- Spouse: Isabel Oli (m. 2015)
- Children: 3
- Relatives: Camille Prats (sister) Naomi Prats (sister)

John Paulo Quiambao Prats (Tagalog pronunciation: [ˈkjɐmbaʊ pɾats]; born February 14, 1984) is a Filipino director, model, entrepreneur and former actor. He started as a child star in 1992. He is the older brother of actress Camille Prats. He was also a former member of the band, JCS.

Prats was a member of ABS-CBN's circle of homegrown talents named Talent Center, now called Star Magic and now currently managed by Cornerstone Entertainment Inc.

In 2000–03, he was paired with Heart Evangelista on the show G-mik, Trip, Ang Tanging Ina, My First Romance and Berks. During the success of their loveteam, they won the (Most Popular Loveteams of RP movies) from 33rd Guillermo Mendoza Memorial Scholarship Foundation.

In 2008, he renewed a contract with ABS-CBN for three more projects, including his special guest appearance of I Love Betty La Fea.

He made his directing debut with Moira Dela Torre's music video "Malaya" in 2017. He retired from acting in 2022 after appearing in FPJ's Ang Probinsyano to focus on directing concerts.

== Early and personal life ==
John Paulo Quiambao Prats was born on February 14, 1984, in Manila, Philippines, to parents Daniel Rafael Prats and Alma Quiambao-Prats, a Kapampangan from Macabebe, Pampanga. Prats has four siblings, including younger sister Camille, who is also an actress. He was educated in OB Montessori and at ABS-CBN Distance Learning Center. Prats is a business management graduate at Thames International Business School. Prats dated actresses Heart Evangelista from 1999 to 2004 and Bianca Manalo in 2011.

On September 24, 2014, Prats organized a flash mob and proposed to his long-time girlfriend Isabel Oli in Eastwood City. On May 16, 2015, Prats and Oli married in Batangas.

== Filmography ==
=== Film ===
Year	Title	Role
1992	Pulis Patola	Cameo Role
1994	Eat All You Can	Cameo Role
1994	Muntik Na Kitang Minahal	
1994	Rollerboys	Zack
1995	Pulis Patola 2	Cameo Role
1995	Batang-X	Kiko "Kidlat" Arsenal
1996	Ang TV: The Movie: The Adarna Adventure	Jimbo
2000	Daddy O! Baby O!	Nico
2000	Tanging Yaman	Andrew
2001	Narinig Mo Na Ba Ang Latest	
2001	Trip	Nathaniel/Athan
2002	Jologs	Ruben
2003	Ang Tanging Ina	Jeffrey Sta. Maria
2003	My First Romance	Che Ricardo
2004	Mano Po III: My Love	Young Paul Yang
2005	Dreamboy	Cameo Role
2005	Happily Ever After	Vince
2005	D' Anothers	JC
2005	Mano Po 4: Ako Legal Wife	Hamilton Chong
2006	Super Noypi	Yñigo Raymundo
2006	Manay Po	Orson Castello
2007	Shake, Rattle and Roll 9	Jong
2008	Manay Po 2: Overload	Orson "Ursula" Castello
2008	Loving You	Axel Chua
2008	Ang Tanging Ina Ninyong Lahat	Jeffrey Sta. Maria
2009	OMG (Oh, My Girl!)	Bob
2013	Sitio	
2016	Diyos-diyosan	
2017	Ang Panday	
2019	3pol Trobol: Huli Ka Balbon!	Junior Calvo

=== Television ===
Year	Title	Role
1992	Ang TV	Various Roles
1993–1994	Sine'skwela	Host
1993–2001	Star Drama Presents	Guest role
1995	Ipaglaban Mo!	
1995–2016	ASAP	Host/Performer
1995–1996	Familia Zaragoza	Luigi Lagrimas
1995–1998	Kaybol	Host
1998–1999	Cyberkada	Host
1998–1999	Super Laff-In	Host
1999	Wansapanataym: Library	
1999–2002	G-mik	Juanito "Yuan" Salcedo
2001	Wansapanataym: Tiquio, Tiquio in the Cue Ball	Tiquio
2001	Da Body en Da Guard	JR
2001–2002	Da Pilya en Da Pilot	JR
2002	Whattamen	Oscar/Oca
2002–2004	Berks	Javier "Javie" Montelibano
2003	Coverstory with John Prats	Host
2003	Maalaala Mo Kaya: Ferry Boat	
2003	Maalaala Mo Kaya: Flat Tire	
2003–2004	It Might Be You	Gian Carlo Pablo
2005	Maalaala Mo Kaya: Trolley	Boy
2005	Prison Break	Tweener
2005–2006	ASAP Fanatic	Host/Performer
2005–2006	My Juan and Only	Henry
2006	Pinoy Big Brother: Celebrity Edition 1	Celebrity Housemate / 2nd Big Placer
2006	Bituing Walang Ningning	Gary
2006	Crazy for You	Paolo
2006–2007	Aalog-Alog	Johnny Montero
2006–2008	Studio 23	VJ
2007	Your Song Presents: With You	Jay
2007	Maalaala Mo Kaya: Rosaryo	Boom-Boom
2007	TFC Connect	Host
2007	Super Inggo 1.5: Ang Bagong Bangis	Protecthor/Thor
2007	Your Song Presents: Sana Ngayong Pasko	Cody
2008	Your Song Presents: Someone Like You	Melvin
2008	I ♥ Betty La Fea	Drake Gonzales
2008	Komiks Presents: Tiny Tony	Tiny Tony
2009	Parekoy	Joseph Dimagiba
2009	Pinoy Bingo Night	Contestant
2009	Precious Hearts Romances Presents: Bud Brothers	Carlo Domingo
2009–2020	Banana Sundae	Various Roles
2009–2010	Moomoo & Me	Oscar
2010	Your Song Presents: Love Me, Love You	Drunker (Cameo)
2010	3ow Powhz!	Guest
2010	Maalaala Mo Kaya: Dancing Shoes	Herbert
2011	Maalaala Mo Kaya	Marlon
2011	Maalaala Mo Kaya: Happy Feet	Ramonito Mata
2011–2012	Happy, Yipee, Yehey	Host
2012	Wansapanataym: Mini Mimi	Paul
2012	Luv U	Calve Sauzen
2012	Pinoy Big Brother: Unlimited	Guest Host
2012	Pinoy Big Brother: Teen Edition 4	Host
2012	Promil Pre-school: I-Shine Talent Camp	Judge/Mentor
2012	Angelito: Ang Bagong Yugto	Rafael "Raffy/Paeng" Montañez
2013	Maalaala Mo Kaya	Julius
2014	Pinoy Big Brother: All In	Host/Houseguest
2014	The Ryzza Mae Show	Guest
2014	Gandang Gabi Vice	Guest
2016–2022	FPJ's Ang Probinsyano	PCMSgt. Jerome Girona Jr.; Director
2018	Tonight with Boy Abunda	Guest Himself
2018	Pinoy Big Brother: Otso	Celebrity Jurado
2021–present	It's Showtime	Director/Judge
2024–2026	Rainbow Rumble	Director
2026–present	Kapamilya, Deal or No Deal	Director

=== Concert direction ===
Year	Title	Date	Venue
2018	Tagpuan	February 17–18, 2018	Kia Theatre
2018	K Brosas: 18k	April 28, 2018	Kia Theatre
2018	RP10: The 10th Anniversary Concert	May 18, 2018	Newport Performing Arts Theatre: Resorts World Manila
2018	Er1k 5antos: My Greatest Moments	September 22, 2018	Mall of Asia Arena
2018	Boyz II Men with D I V AS	December 15, 2018	Araneta Coliseum
2019	Jaya: At Her Finest	April 3, 2019	Newport Performing Arts Theatre: Resorts World Manila
2019	Extra Ordinary	May 22, 2019	Newport Performing Arts Theatre: Resorts World Manila
2019	Angeline K'to Concert namin to	July 12, 2019	Araneta Coliseum
2019	Braver	September 13, 2019	Araneta Coliseum
2019	Zephanie at the New Frontier Theater	November 28, 2019	New Frontier Theater
2019	RP10: The 10th Anniversary Concert	December 6, 2019	Newport Performing Arts Theatre: Resorts World Manila
2020	Ikaw ang Liwanag at Ligaya: The ABS-CBN Christmas Special	December 20, 2020	ABS-CBN Studios
2021	Andito Tayo Para sa Isa't Isa: The ABS-CBN Christmas Special 2021	December 18, 2021	ABS-CBN Studios
2022	Tayo ang Ligaya ng Isa't Isa: The ABS-CBN Christmas Special 2022	December 17–18, 2022	ABS-CBN Studios
2025	Get, Get, Aw!: The SexBomb Concert	December 4, 2025	Araneta Coliseum
2025	Get, Get, Aw!: The SexBomb Concert	December 9, 2025	SM Mall of Asia Arena
2026	G22: The Eve of an Alpha	July 12, 2026	New Frontier Theater
2026	Angela Ken: Panahon Na Natin	October 18, 2026	New Frontier Theater

== Discography ==
=== Recording album ===
Year released	Album title	Details	Certification	Record label
2000	JCS	1st JCS band album Carrier single: "Nang Makilala Ka"	PARI: Gold	Istilo Records; Star Music

=== Single/Soundtrack ===
Year released	Song title	Details	Record label
2000	"I Love You Na Lang (Sa Pasko)" by JCS band	From the Christmas Album Hindi Pasko'y Pag-Ibig	Star Music
2000	"G-mik (Remix)" by JCS band	From the compilation album OPM Dance Remix	Star Music
2001	"G-mik 2001" themesong by JCS band	"Teleserye Theme Songs" album	Star Music
2002	"Masama Yan" by Prats & Gloc-9	Jologs film	Startraxx Records; Star Music
2002	"Blue Jeans (Revised)" by Prats & Ketchup Eusebio	Berks television series	Star Music
2003	"Please Be Careful with My Heart" by Prats & Heart Evangelista	My First Romance film	Star Music

=== Dance albums ===
Year	Album title	Details	Record label
2007	ASAP Ultimate Dance 4	1st ASAP Dance Album; Certified Platinum; Carrier single: "Kembot"	ASAP Music; Star Music
2007	ASAP Supahdance	2nd ASAP Dance Album	ASAP Music; Star Music
2010	ASAP Supahdance 2	John's 4th Dance Album; With Kim Chiu, Rayver Cruz, Gabriel Valenciano & Mickey Perz	ASAP Music; Star Music

== Awards and nominations ==
Year	Award-giving body	Award	Nominated work	Result
2002	Yes! Magazine	Top 50 Scene Stealers of the Year	Himself	Included
2002	AnakTV Youth Vote	NCR's Favorite Male Actor	G-mik	Won
2003	33rd GMMSF Box-Office Entertainment Awards	Most Popular Loveteam of RP Movies with Heart Evangelista	G-mik	Won
2003	Circle Of 10 Image Models Search	Celebrity Endorsers of the Year with Heart Evangelista	Himself	Won
2003	Teens' Voice Awards	Best Male Commercial Model	Himself	Included
2003	17th PMPC Star Awards for TV	Best Single Performance by an Actor	Maalaala Mo Kaya: Ferry Boat	Nominated
2003	AnakTV Youth Vote	Nationwide's Favorite Male Actor	Berks	Nominated
2004	30th Metro Manila Film Festival	Best Festival Supporting Actor	Mano Po III: My Love	Nominated
2005	19th PMPC Star Awards for TV	Best Single Performance by an Actor	Maalaala Mo Kaya: Trolley	Nominated
2005	31st Metro Manila Film Festival	Best Festival Supporting Actor	Mano Po 4: Ako Legal Wife	Nominated
2006	Chalk Magazine	50 Hottest Guys of 2006	Himself	Rank 15
2006	Cosmopolitan Magazine	Top 10 Cosmo Bachelors of 2006	Himself	Included
2007	StarStudio Magazine	Most Desired Men	Himself	Included
