= Your Song (Philippine TV series) =

2006–11 Philippine television drama series

- Genre: Drama, Comedy, Musical, Anthology
- Starring: Various
- Country of origin: Philippines
- Original language: Filipino
- No. of episodes: 239 (list of episodes)

Production
- Running time: 1 hour
- Production companies: Dreamscape Entertainment Television; Star Creatives

Original release
- Network: ABS-CBN
- Release: February 12, 2006 – March 27, 2011

Your Song is a Philippine musical drama anthology show broadcast by ABS-CBN. It aired from February 12, 2006 to March 27, 2011, replacing Pinoy Big Brother Buzz and was replaced by Good Vibes.

The plot of each episode is inspired by a hit song performed by a local artist. The song title is used as the episode title, while the song itself is used throughout the episode as background music. A new cast is featured in each episode.

== Episodes ==
From Seasons 1 to 7, Your Song had weekly episodes featuring songs as title and theme. Seasons 1 and 2 had both 11 episodes. Season 3 had 14 episodes, Season 4 had 11 episodes, Season 5 had 12 episodes, Season 6 had 8 episodes while Season 7 had 18 episodes. Season 2 had one special screening to introduce ABS-CBN's drama series Bituing Walang Ningning.

For Season 8, Your Song featured stories based on chosen songs, where each story arc will now be shown for a whole month changing parts, due to another ABS-CBN program counterpart Love Spell that had weekly episodes. The season reverted to its weekly episode-format in February 2009. The season had a total of 13 story arcs, with My Only Hope the longest seasonal episodes every in the history of the show.

For Season 9, the stories are based on film, where each story is a remake of a certain Filipino film. It had only two stories: Underage and Boystown. both stories ran for weeks. For Season 10, the show reverted to the song format, although each story arc ran for several weeks. There is a total of five episodes.

For Season 11, the show continued on its song format where each story arc ran for weeks. There was a total of six episodes, including two stories that did not feature any song, namely Isla and Gimik 2010.

For Season 12 (also their final season), Your Song featured artists in several different episodes. The artists featured are Andi Eigenmann and Kim Chiu.

== See also ==
- List of programs broadcast by ABS-CBN
