= List of The Blood Sisters characters =

The following is a list of main, recurring, supporting, notable and minor characters appeared in The Blood Sisters (TV series), a Filipino drama television series created and developed by Reggie Amigo and Rondel P. Lindayag and produced by ABS-CBN. The series premiered on February 12, 2018 on the network's prime time block, 5:40 or 6:00 p.m. time slot, and on worldwide via The Filipino Channel. The series is under the helm of Jojo A. Saguin and Catherine Grace Abarrando and Roselle Soldao-Ganaban serves as the executive producer for the entire run of the show.

Erich Gonzales stars as the triplets, main character lead portraying three characters with distinct personalities: shy-type young mother from the province, a promising surgeon from an elite family and an aggressive, foul-mouthed social climber. Erich plays Erika, a simple meek girl but feisty and aggressive when provoked. She also plays Carrie, a socialite, cool person with a calm personality. And finally, Agatha, cold-hearted and a gold digger who wants to become rich and powerful. Enchong Dee, AJ Muhlach and Ejay Falcon stars as the leading man. While, Maika Rivera star as another villain.

== Protagonist ==
Actor	Character	Description
Erich Gonzales	Erika Castillo / Erika B. Almeda / Almira Magtibay	The eldest of the triplets, and one of the two infants stolen from their biological mother (Adele). Erika was kidnapped as an infant and later abandoned in a garbage dump. Erika grows up in the street and is fostered several times. She is a single mother to Jolo, working in a strip club. She witnesses a murder of a syndicate member and is pursued by the syndicate who think she has their ledger. Despite her seemingly meek and humble nature, Erika is street smart and very violent fighter when provoked, particularly if it concerns her son's safety. Unlike her sister Agatha's fierce nature, or her sister Carrie's professional demeanour, Erika is simple and humble. When she reunites with her two sisters, she becomes opposed to Agatha because of the differences in their personalities.
Erich Gonzales	Dr. Carrie Ann B. Almeda / Agnes Magtibay	Carrie is a successful physician in obstetrics and gynaecology, and is the second of the triplets. She is stolen from Adele and raised a Bermudez-Almeda. Because of her affluent upbringing, Carrie is easily the most confident and accomplished of her sisters, but can be judgemental when opposing her sisters. Nonetheless, she is instrumental in integrating her sisters into her family. She is clever and as resilient as her sisters. Unlike her other siblings, she grows up loved, appreciated and surrounded in wealth and privilege. Carrie is described as a sophisticated socialite, but despite her advantages, she becomes envious of Agatha and Erika because of the attention they receive from their mother. She is unaware of the illegal activities of baby farming in Paraiso.
Erich Gonzales	Agatha Magtibay / Agatha B. Almeda	Agatha is the youngest of the triplets, the only one of the triplets that was not taken from their biological mother, Adele. She grows up full of resentment towards her absent mother, then develops a sociopathic personality. Unlike Erika, she was indulged by an absent mother who worked abroad, private school educated, but never accepted by her classmates and her peers. She seeks a mother's love, yet punishes her for growing up without her. Agatha's only goal is to steal all the Bermudez’ riches, and terrorizes her friends, family and enemies to achieve it. She switches loyalties easily and pits everyone against each other.

== Leading Man ==
Actor	Character	Description
Enchong Dee	Dr. Samuel Hechanova	A resident pediatrician, and Carrie's ex-fiancé. His family is one of the biggest investors of the Bermudez Medical Center. His father Manuel is a co-founder of the hospital. Although he was originally in love with Carrie, he develops feelings for Erika.
AJ Muhlach	Rainier Lacuesta†	The illegitimate son of the Syndicate leader and head of operations. He is tasked to find Erika and the ledger. He becomes Agatha's lover. He is Rocco's nephew. He, together with Greg's wife and daughters, died in an ambush plotted by Rocco.
Ejay Falcon	Antonio "Tonyo" Alipio	Erika's childhood best friend in Manila. He takes care of Erika's son and Uncle Bruce after Erika flees the syndicate.He finds the Paraiso ledger and gives it to Erika for safekeeping. He falls in love with Carrie. In the end of the series, he is now engaged with Carrie during their birthday with Erika and Agatha.

== Antagonist ==
Actor	Character	Description
Maika Rivera	Andrea Bermudez	Andrea is the evil cousin who masterminds the attempt to kill her grandmother because Rosemarie refuses to help her ailing daughter in law (Andrea's mother). Raised as a Bermudez, Andrea is a sophisticated girl who resents the appearance of the triplets in her life. She schemes to destroy them as she intends to be the sole beneficiary of the Bermudez wealth. As the series go on, she creates chaos and conflict as much as her cousin Agatha. Her cruelty towards the triplets builds up in the series. Her only mission in her life is to usurp all the wealth and power of the family to avenge her grandmother's cruel treatment of her parents. Although she feints an alliance with Agatha, she does not trust Agatha and sees her as an enemy. She pretends to ally with her grandmother too. Later in the series, her crimes are exposed by Debbie and others. Andrea was arrested by the authorities and sentenced to prison.
Jake Cuenca	Rocco Fernandez	Rocco becomes the new enemy of Fabian, Rainier and Greg. He does everything to conquer Paraiso from Fabian and becomes an unlikely ally to Erika. Rocco is ruthless and cunning. He is an illegitimate son of Fabian/Patron from Lorraine. He is disowned by Patron as a child because of his physical appearance. Resentful of his father, He successfully plots his revenge on Fabian by first getting Greg's family, including Rainier, ambushed and killed.

== Secondary / recurring cast ==
Actor	Character	Description
Dina Bonnevie	Dr. Deborah Marie "Debbie" Bermudez-Almeda	Rosemarie's only daughter, Norman's wife, and Erika, Carrie, and Agatha's over protective mother. She schemes to make Adele's life miserable. However, she is unaware that Adele had a miscarriage, thus the triplets who were born later on are not Debbie's biological daughters.
Cherry Pie Picache	Adele Magtibay	She is Norman's ex-girlfriend who was a maid in the Almeda household. Adele originally agrees to a surrogate agreement to carry Deborah's daughter, but later suffers a miscarriage. Norman seduces Adele and gets her pregnant again without Debbie's knowledge. Realizing she cannot give up the child in her womb, Adele escapes from the Almedas and delivers triplets. Despite her friendly nature, Adele is selfish when it comes to her triplets and her wrong decisions impact everyone's lives.
Jestoni Alarcon	Norman Almeda	He is the biological father of the triplets whose initial deception surrounding the triplets’ conception snowballs into the chaotic lives of his daughters.
Tessie Tomas	Dr. Rosemarie Bermudez	Deborah's mother who despises Norman and the triplets. She is an unethical doctor who engages in the illegal and lucrative business of baby farms. Sentenced to prison for her crimes.
Dante Rivero	Fabian "Patron" Solomon	The triplets’ enemy. He is leader of the syndicate and one of the owners of Paraiso, a baby farm engaging in the illegal practice of surrogacy. He wants to kill Erika because he thinks she has their ledger. He does not know that the waitress who killed their accountant and stole the ledger was another woman (Ana Cruz) working with an unknown group out to grab his syndicate and all its wealth. He is Rocco's father who disowns the young Rocco because of the latter's physical appearance. Later shot to death by Rocco during a fight.
Nathalie Hart	Sahara Fernandez	Rocco's half-sister and sworn enemy of the Bermudez-Almeda family. She is the mole in Fabian's organizational working for her half brother. Sahara is responsible for the death of Greg's family. She was killed after being run over by Erika and Samuel during a shootout.
Ian De Leon	Greg Solomon	Rainier's abusive and ruthless father, the Patron's son and the Underboss of Patron's syndicate. He is Rocco's paternal half-brother. He mourns the death of his family from a car explosion. Later he gets very angry when he killed his father, he engaging dueling with Rocco but he was stabbed to death during a fight.
Pilar Pilapil	Vida Hechanova	She is Dr. Rosemarie's rival, a philanthropist who invests a lot of money in the Bermudez Fertility Centre to honor her son's legacy. Her son Manuel co-founded the Medical and Fertility Centre with Rosemarie. She is cold and easy to get angry. She is not keen on Carrie's and Samuel's relationship only because she senses Carrie's lukewarm feeling for her grandson. She hopes her grandson Samuel carries on his father's legacy in the Bermudez Medical Centre.
Pamu Pamorada	Pam	Agatha's best friend and partner in crime. Pam is also greedy and manipulative like her best friend but hides her character behind a humble exterior. She and Dante are frenemies. Later Agatha gives her the ledger for safekeeping.
Ogie Diaz	Bruce	Erika's friend who looks after Jolo and is Tonyo's uncle.
Thou Reyes	Dante	Agatha's friend whom she takes advantage of and uses for her criminal activities. He likes Agatha.
Alora Sassam	Mimi	One of the Bermudez family servants.
Tanya Garcia-Lapid	Brenda Solomon	Villain, Greg's wife and the mother of two daughters with Greg. Brenda hates Rainier. She later died because Rocco shot their car and it exploded.
Ruby Ruiz	Ligaya Magtibay	Adele's mother and the triplets’ grandmother (also Jolo's great-grandmother) who raised Agatha while Adele worked as an OFW in Dubai.She can be categorized as a villain sometimes when defending her loved ones against Debbie.
Dindi Gallardo	Tessa Hechanova	Samuel's mother who wants her son to marry Carrie but does not necessarily approve of their relationship.
Sandino Martin	Juancho	A members of the syndicate and Rainier's rival. He was raised by Greg. He also one of the mastermind in stealing the ledger and tricking Patron. He killed Ana Cruz. He opposes the triplets and dislikes Agatha. He is secretly Rocco's man.
Neil Coleta	Ondoy	Agatha's friend and Dante & Pam's roommate.
Raven Molina	Gabo	Agatha's friend and Dante & Pam's roommate.
Karlo Ezekiel Torres	Jolo Castillo / Jolo Almeda	Erika's only son with Emman and Carrie and Agatha's nephew.
Paolo Serrano	Condrad	Patron's bodyguard and Greg's henchman
Mark Marasigan	Marcus	One of Rocco men.
Mike Loren	Police Insp. Marciano	the police inspector of the Almedas.

== Special Participation ==
Actor	Character	Description
Heart Ramos	young Agatha/Erika/Carrie	The young triplets as they were separated into different lives.
Patrick Garcia	Emman Suarez	Jolo's father who abandons him and Erika, then returns to win his son back. He has another family of his own.
Erin Ocampo	Heidi Suarez	Emman's wife and Jolo's stepmother.
Lander Vera Perez	Chito	The syndicate's bookkeeper and accountant and the owner of the ledger before he was killed by Ana Cruz.
Janice Hung	Laura / Ana Cruz	She murders the accountant to obtain the ledger and later she is killed by Juancho.
Mara Lopez	Maria	One of the surrogate mothers who try to escape from Paraiso and later killed by Fabian.
Daryl Ong	Himself/Singer	A singer and backdrop character.
Ricardo Cepeda	Dr. Manuel Hechanova	The late father of Samuel, who was killed because of his discovery of Paraiso's illegal activities.
John Lapus	Odet	A neighbor in Baguio.
Ana Capri	Lorraine	Rocco and Sahara's mother.
Marco Masa	Young Rocco Fernandez	He plays the young Rocco.
Angelika Rama	young Sahara	Grew up in a different background than her brother Rocco.
