= List of The Blood Sisters episodes =

The Blood Sisters is a 2018 Philippine drama television series directed by Jojo Saguin, starring Erich Gonzales in three characters: Erika, Carrie and Agatha. The series premiered on ABS-CBN's Primetime Bida evening block and worldwide on The Filipino Channel on February 12, 2018, replacing Wildflower.

Dreamscape is the unit helming the production of The Blood Sisters. It was the initiative of Dreamscape Entertainment Head Deo Endrinal to deliberately create a show that is somewhat similar to the 1999 TV series, Saan Ka Man Naroroon. Where he served as one of the series' creative consultants. He suggested recreating Claudine's top-rating series but with a different touch. After numerous brainstorming sessions and careful deliberations, the creative team came up with The Blood Sisters concept about the triplets- Erika, Carrie and Agatha. The main difference between Saan Ka Man Naroroon and the series is that the story tackles the issue of surrogacy.

== Series overview ==
Season	Episodes	Originally released	
Season	Episodes	First released	Last released
1	78	February 12, 2018	June 1, 2018
2	54	June 4, 2018	August 17, 2018

== Legend ==
Green numbers is the highest rating of the entire series.
Red numbers is the lowest rating of the entire series.
Orange numbers is the highest rating of per season.
Blue numbers is the lowest rating per season.

== Episodes ==
=== Season 1 (2018) ===
No. overall	No. in season	Title	Twitter hashtag	Original air date	Kantar Media Rating (Nationwide)
1	1	"Simula" (Beginning)	#TBSSimula	February 12, 2018	25.2%
2	2	"Pagpapanggap" (Pretending)	#TBSPagpapanggap	February 13, 2018	22.9%
3	3	"Triplets"	#TBSTriplets	February 14, 2018	19.8%
4	4	"Lihim" (Secret)	#TBSLihim	February 15, 2018	23.5%
5	5	"Katotohanan" (Truth)	#TBSKatotohanan	February 16, 2018	20.7%
6	6	"Takas" (Flee)	#TBSTakas	February 19, 2018	22%
7	7	"Harapan" (Face-to-Face)	#TBSHarapan	February 20, 2018	20.4%
8	8	"Ugnayan" (Relation)	#TBSUgnayan	February 21, 2018	21.1%
9	9	"Paraiso" (Paradise)	#TBSParaiso	February 22, 2018	24.8%
10	10	"Kaarawan" (Birthday)	#TBSKaarawan	February 23, 2018	22.9%
11	11	"Bisto" (Discovery)	#TBSBisto	February 26, 2018	24.7%
12	12	"Duda" (Doubts)	#TBSDuda	February 27, 2018	24.2%
13	13	"Koneksyon" (Connection)	#TBSKoneksyon	February 28, 2018	22.9%
14	14	"Pagtanggap" (Recognize)	#TBSPagtanggap	March 1, 2018	28.1%
15	15	"Pag-Amin" (Confession)	#TSBPagAmin	March 2, 2018	20.6%
16	16	"Hinala" (Suspicion)	#TBSHinala	March 5, 2018	19.3%
17	17	"Regalo" (Gifts)	#TBSRegalo	March 6, 2018	19.2%
18	18	"Linlang" (Trickery)	#TBSLinlang	March 7, 2018	22.3%
19	19	"Kidnap"	#TBSKidnap	March 8, 2018	20.9%
20	20	"Hanap" (Search)	#TBSHanap	March 9, 2018	20.4%
21	21	"Nasundan" (Follow)	#TBSNasundan	March 12, 2018	22.2%
22	22	"Nakaw" (Stalk)	#TBSNakaw	March 13, 2018	22.1%
23	23	"Kulong" (Locked-Up)	#TBSKulong	March 14, 2018	22.8%
24	24	"Ultimatum"	#TBSUltimatum	March 15, 2018	22.8%
25	25	"Selos" (Jealousy)	#TBSSelos	March 16, 2018	20.7%
26	26	"Paglaya" (Release)	#TBSPaglaya	March 19, 2018	21.0%
27	27	"Bayad" (Paid)	#TBSBayad	March 20, 2018	18.2%
28	28	"Ang Paghaharap" (The Confrontation)	#TBSAngPaghaharap	March 21, 2018	22.5%
29	29	"Pagpasok Sa Mansion" (Trespassing The Mansion)	#TBSPagpasokSaMansion	March 22, 2018	22.2%
30	30	"Lakad Ng Triplets" (Sisters’ Night Out)	#TBSLakadNgTriplets	March 23, 2018	19.2%
31	31	"Unahan Kay Adele" (The Head Of Adele)	#TBSUnahanKayAdele	March 26, 2018	19.2%
32	32	"Sumbong" (Report)	#TBSSumbong	March 27, 2018	19.8%
33	33	"Lantaran" (Openly)	#TBSLantaran	March 28, 2018	18.1%
34	34	"Hindi Magpapatalo" (Will Never Be Beaten)	#TBSHindiMagpapatalo	April 2, 2018	21.4%
35	35	"Lukso Ng Dugo" (Jumping Blood)	#TBSLuksoNgDugo	April 3, 2018	20.5%
36	36	"Pagkukunwari" (Pretend)	#TBSPagkukunwari	April 4, 2018	20.4%
37	37	"Pagpapakilala" (Glance)	#TBSPagpapakilala	April 5, 2018	19.9%
38	38	"Pusong Ina" (Mother's Love)	#TBSPusongIna	April 6, 2018	19.6%
39	39	"Bisita" (Visitor)	#TBSBisita	April 9, 2018	17.5%
40	40	"Babala" (Warning)	#TBSBabala	April 10, 2018	19.4%
41	41	"Sa Ina" (As Mothers)	#TBSSaIna	April 11, 2018	17.3%
42	42	"Imbestiga" (Investigate)	#TBSImbestiga	April 12, 2018	17.4%
43	43	"Tuso" (Cunning)	#TBSTuso	April 13, 2018	16.5%
44	44	"Kutob" (Hunch)	#TBSKutob	April 16, 2018	18.7%
45	45	"Iskandalo" (Scandal)	#TBSIskandalo	April 17, 2018	19.9%
46	46	"Pustahan" (Bets)	#TBSPustahan	April 18, 2018	17.1%
47	47	"Agresibo" (Bold)	#TBSAgresibo	April 19, 2018	15.9%
48	48	"Diskubre" (Discovery)	#TBSDiskubre	April 20, 2018	16.5%
49	49	"Kapalit" (Exchange)	#TBSKapalit	April 23, 2018	15.9%
50	50	"Pagtuklas" (Uncovering)	#TBSPagtuklas	April 24, 2018	16.9%
51	51	"Yakap" (Embrace)	#TBSYakap	April 25, 2018	18.3%
52	52	"Mamita Vs. Agatha"	#TBSMamitaVsAgatha	April 26, 2018	18.2%
53	53	"Ganti" (Revenge)	#TBSGanti	April 27, 2018	16.2%
54	54	"Salarin" (Culprit)	#TBSSalarin	April 30, 2018	15.9%
55	55	"Paratang" (Allegation)	#TBSParatang	May 1, 2018	19.3%
56	56	"May Nagbabalik" (Emman Returns)	#TBSMayNagbabalik	May 2, 2018	17.2%
57	57	"Ebidensya" (Evidence)	#TBSEbidensya	May 3, 2018	20.8%
58	58	"Karma" (Karma)	#TBSKarma	May 4, 2018	16.3%
59	59	"Sabwatan" (Combinations)	#TBSSabwatan	May 7, 2018	15.9%
60	60	"Alas" (Ace)	#TBSAlas	May 8, 2018	17.2%
61	61	"Panganib" (Danger)	#TBSPanganib	May 9, 2018	16.9%
62	62	"Agawan" (Rivalry)	#TBSAgawan	May 10, 2018	16.4%
63	63	"Kadugo"	#TBSKadugo	May 11, 2018	16%
64	64	"Taguan" (Hideout)	#TBSTaguan	May 14, 2018	15.4%
65	65	"Sugod" (Dash)	#TBSSugod	May 15, 2018	16.8%
66	66	"Suspetsa" (Suspicion)	#TBSSuspetsa	May 16, 2018	16.6%
67	67	"Takot" (Fear)	#TBSTakot	May 17, 2018	19.2%
68	68	"Ransom"	#TBSRansom	May 18, 2018	17.3%
69	69	"Agaw-Buhay" (Brink of Death)	#TBSAgawBuhay	May 21, 2018	17.7%
70	70	"Bunyag" (Reveal)	#TBSBunyag	May 22, 2018	17.5%
71	71	"Traydor" (Traitor)	#TBSTraydor	May 23, 2018	16.5%
72	72	"Suklam" (Scorn)	#TBSSuklam	May 24, 2018	18.0%
73	73	"Paniningil" (Reclaim)	#TBSPaniningil	May 25, 2018	18.1%
74	74	"Ambush"	#TBSAmbush	May 28, 2018	16.3%
75	75	"Pagdurusa" (Suffering)	#TBSPagdurusa	May 29, 2018	21.7%
76	76	"Hiling Ni Erika" (Erika's Wish)	#TBSHilingNiErika	May 30, 2018	18.6%
77	77	"Pagbagsak ng Paraiso" (The Fall of Paraiso)	#TBSPagbagsakNgParaiso	May 31, 2018	21.2%
78	78	"Hinagpis" (Anguish)	#TBSHinagpis	June 1, 2018	18.5%

=== Season 2 (2018) ===
No. overall	No. in season	Title	Twitter hashtag	Original air date	Kantar Media Rating (Nationwide)
79	1	"Misa Para Kay Jolo" (Mass For Jolo)	#TBSMisaParaKayJolo	June 4, 2018	16.8%
80	2	"Hindi Susuko" (Never Surrender)	#TBSHindiSusuko	June 5, 2018	19.7%
81	3	"Sangko" (Involved)	#TBSSangkot	June 6, 2018	19.8%
82	4	"Mukha Ng Kalaban" (Enemy's Face)	#TBSMukhaNgKalaban	June 7, 2018	20.0%
83	5	"Arestado" (Arrested)	#TBSArestado	June 8, 2018	18.4%
84	6	"Matinding Paniniwala" (Strong Belief)	#TBSMatindingPaniniwala	June 11, 2018	19.0%
85	7	"Wanted"	#TBSWanted	June 12, 2018	18.5%
86	8	"Palihim" (In Secrecy)	#TBSPalihim	June 13, 2018	18.2%
87	9	"Unahan" (Get Ahead)	#TBSUnahan	June 14, 2018	18.2%
88	10	"Nasaan Ang Pera" (Where’s The Money?)	#TBSNasaanAngPera	June 15, 2018	19.6%
89	11	"Pananakot" (Intimidation)	#TBSPananakot	June 18, 2018	16.8%
90	12	"Set Up"	#TBSSetUp	June 19, 2018	16.7%
91	13	"Paglalantad" (To Expose)	#TBSPaglalantad	June 20, 2018	19.1%
92	14	"Pagsisinungaling" (Lying)	#TBSPagsisinungaling	June 21, 2018	19.1%
93	15	"Natuklasan" (Discover)	#TBSNatuklasan	June 22, 2018	18.9%
94	16	"Partner"	#TBSPartner	June 25, 2018	19.5%
95	17	"Delikado" (In Danger)	#TBSDelikado	June 26, 2018	19.0%
96	18	"Jackpot"	#TBSJackpot	June 27, 2018	18.1%
97	19	"Gulangan" (To Take Advantage)	#TBSGulangan	June 28, 2018	18.7%
98	20	"Strategy"	#TBSStrategy	June 29, 2018	16.7%
99	21	"Despedida" (Farewell Party)	#TBSDespedida	July 2, 2018	16.6%
100	22	"Pasabog" (Blast)	#TBSPasabog	July 3, 2018	16.5%
101	23	"Aminado" (Admit)	#TBSAminado	July 4, 2018	18.1%
102	24	"Donor"	#TBSDonor	July 5, 2018	21.5%
103	25	"Pagkikita ng Mag Ina" (Meet the Mother)	#TBSPagkikitaNgMagIna	July 6, 2018	16.7%
104	26	"Trauma"	#TBSTrauma	July 9, 2018	16.5%
105	27	"Desisyon" (Decision)	#TBSDesisyon	July 10, 2018	20.8%
106	28	"Paglayo" (Stay Away)	#TBSPaglayo	July 11, 2018	18.5%
107	29	"Utos" (Command)	#TBSUtos	July 12, 2018	21.3%
108	30	"Mastermind"	#TBSMastermind	July 13, 2018	20.5%
109	31	"Target"	#TBSTarget	July 16, 2018	17.9%
110	32	"Laban Carrie"	#TBSLabanCarrie	July 17, 2018	22.1%
111	33	"Konsensya"	#TBSKonsensya	July 18, 2018	18.8%
112	34	"Palatandaan"	#TBSPalatandaan	July 19, 2018	17.7%
113	35	"Imbestigasyon"	#TBSImbestigasyon	July 20, 2018	19.4%
114	36	"Eskapo"	#TBSEskapo	July 24, 2018 (Note: Episode 114 did not air on July 23 due to SONA State of the Nation Address news coverage.)	17.9%
115	37	"Double Cross"	#TBSDoubleCross	July 25, 2018	18.1%
116	38	"Kumpirmado" (Confirmed)	#TBSKumpirmado	July 26, 2018	18.1%
117	39	"Entrapment"	#TBSEntrapment	July 27, 2018	18.0%
118	40	"Captured"	#TBSCaptured	July 30, 2018	16.9%
119	41	"Utakan"	#TBSUtakan	July 31, 2018	17.4%
120	42	"Palabas"	#TBSPalabas	August 1, 2018	16.6%
121	43	"Confession"	#TBSConfession	August 2, 2018	17.5%
122	44	"Kabayaran"	#TBSKabayaran	August 3, 2018	17.3%
123	45	"Hostage"	#TBSHostage	August 6, 2018	20.4%
124	46	"Gising Carrie" (Awake Carrie)	#TBSGisingCarrie	August 7, 2018	20.8%
125	47	"Sanib Pwersa" (Lap Forces)	#TBSSanibPwersa	August 8, 2018	19.9%
126	48	"Buhay Sa Buhay" (Life in Life)	#TBSBuhaySaBuhay	August 9, 2018	23.5%
127	49	"Para Sa Anak" (For the Son)	#TBSParaSaAnak	August 10, 2018	23.8%
128	50	"Proposal"	#TBSProposal	August 13, 2018	25.5%
129	51	"Reunion"	#TBSReunion	August 14, 2018	22.0%
130	52	"Pagkakaisa" (Unity)	#TBSPagkakaisa	August 15, 2018	23.9%
131	53	"As One"	#TBSAsOne	August 16, 2018	25.8%
132	54	"Threelling Finale"	#TBSThreellingFinale	August 17, 2018	25.4%
