= La Vida Lena =

2020–22 Philippine television drama series

- Title card
- Genre: Melodrama; Revenge
- Created by: Reggie Amigo
- Written by: Mari Lamasan; Mariami Tanangco-Domingo; Camille Anne de la Cruz; Chris Tan
- Directed by: Jerry Lopez Sineneng; Jojo Saguin; Andoy Ranay; Emille Joson (ext. shots)
- Starring: Erich Gonzales; Carlo Aquino; JC de Vera; Kit Thompson; Agot Isidro; Raymond Bagatsing; Janice de Belen
- Music by: Len Calvo; Adriane Macalipay
- Opening theme: "La Vida Lena" by JMKO; "Kailangan Kita" by Regine Velasquez
- Country of origin: Philippines
- Original language: Filipino
- No. of episodes: 10 (iWantTFC); 160 (list of episodes)

Production
- Executive producers: Carlo L. Katigbak; Jamie L. Lopez; Cory V. Vidanes; Laurenti M. Dyogi; Roldeo T. Endrinal; Ginny Monteagudo-Ocampo
- Producer: Jemila M. Jimenez
- Production location: Antipolo, Rizal
- Editor: Ray Ann Kristelle Endaya
- Running time: 30-50 minutes
- Production company: Dreamscape Entertainment

Original release
- Network: iWantTFC
- Release: November 14, 2020 – January 16, 2021
- Network: Kapamilya Channel/A2Z/TV5
- Release: June 28, 2021 – February 4, 2022

La Vida Lena is a Philippine revenge drama television series broadcast by Kapamilya Channel. Directed by Jerry Lopez Sineneng, Jojo Saguin and Andoy Ranay, it stars Erich Gonzales in the title role. The fast-cut version of the series was streamed on iWantTFC from November 14, 2020 to January 16, 2021. The full version of the series was aired on the network's Primetime Bida evening block from June 28, 2021 to February 4, 2022.

== Plot ==
Despite being the subject of bullying and discrimination because of the big scar on her face, Magda refuses to let criticisms get to her and strives hard to secure a comfortable life for her family. Using her skills and intelligence, she hits the jackpot when the soap she created quickly gains popularity in the town of Salvacion. However, the young lady's success does not sit well with the Narciso family, the owners of Royal Wellness, the biggest surgical and cosmetic company in the country. When Magda refuses to sell her formula to the Narcisos due to their contrasting views, a string of bad luck comes her way. Losing everything dear to her, Magda returns with a new face, armed with determination to retaliate against the powerful clan who ruined her life.

== Cast and characters ==
=== Main cast ===
- Erich Gonzales as Magdalena "Lena" Mendoza Narciso-Cabrera
- Carlo Aquino as Jordan Cabrera
- JC de Vera as Adrian Narciso / Adrian Suarez
- Kit Thompson as Miguel Villarica
- Agot Isidro as Vanessa Rubio-Narciso
- Raymond Bagatsing as Lukas Narciso
- Janice de Belen as Ramona Joaquin

=== Supporting cast ===
- Sofia Andres as Rachel Suarez-Villarica
- Pen Medina as Francisco "Kiko" Cabrera
- Ruby Ruiz as Digna Abuel-Cabrera
- Christian Vasquez as Conrad Suarez
- Malou Crisologo as Martina Ramirez
- Josh Ivan Morales as Brian Rubio
- Hasna Cabral as Bettina "Betchay" Buenafe
- Renshi de Guzman as Rambo Lumba
- Danica Ontengco as Allison Suarez / Alice Garcia

=== Guest cast ===
- Isay Alvarez as Helen Mendoza
- Miguel Faustmann as Don Luis Narciso
- Giovanni Baldesseri as Fernando Castro
- Soliman Cruz as Diosdado "Dado" Mendoza

== Production ==
=== Casting ===
Ivana Alawi was originally cast for the lead role, with a working title Lihim ni Ligaya. The pre-production had started and the cast was already introduced during a press conference back in February 2020. Due to COVID-19 pandemic and enhanced community quarantine in Luzon in March 2020, Alawi backed out of the project; her main reason was to avoid risking the health of her family as she will be exposed during lock-in tapings. In August, Deo Endrinal, the head of Dreamscape Entertainment, approached Erich Gonzales to take on the lead role. The title of the series is officially named La Vida Lena, inspired by Jojo Saguin, one of the directors who is known to her colleague named Lena. From Ligaya, the lead character's name was changed to Magdalena Mendoza. Several recasting and revisions in the script are being made to suit the new theme and new cast. La Vida Lena served as Gonzales' return to television two years after playing her first triple role in The Blood Sisters (2018).

=== Filming duration ===
Pre-production started in September 2020. The entire cast and crew underwent rigorous procedures and COVID-19 protocols before heading down to their filming location at Antipolo. The first cycle of lock-in taping started on October 1, 2020, and finished on October 17, 2020. Second cycle of taping resumed on November 15, 2020, and finished on December 4, 2020. Third cycle of taping started on January 10, 2021, and finished on January 30, 2021. The fourth and final cycle of taping concluded in February 2021.

== Broadcast ==
La Vida Lena originally released on iWantTFC from November 14, 2020 to January 16, 2021 with only 10 episodes.

It aired the full release from June 28, 2021 to February 4, 2022 with 160 episodes broadcast from Kapamilya Channel, Kapamilya Online Live, A2Z, TV5, and Jeepney TV.

It also had aired re-runs on both Jeepney TV and ALLTV from December 9, 2024 to July 18, 2025.

== Awards and nominations ==
Accolades received by La Vida Lena
Year	Awards ceremony	Title	Recipient	Result	Ref.
2023	PMPC Star Awards for Television	Best Primetime Drama Series	—N/a	Nominated	
2023	PMPC Star Awards for Television	Best Drama Actress	Erich Gonzales	Nominated	
2023	PMPC Star Awards for Television	Best Drama Actor	Carlo Aquino	Nominated	
2023	PMPC Star Awards for Television	Best Drama Actor	JC de Vera	Nominated	
2023	PMPC Star Awards for Television	Best Drama Supporting Actor	Raymond Bagatsing	Nominated	
2023	PMPC Star Awards for Television	Best Drama Supporting Actress	Agot Isidro	Nominated	
2023	PMPC Star Awards for Television	Best Drama Supporting Actress	Janice de Belen	Nominated	
2023	PMPC Star Awards for Television	Best New Female TV Personality	Hasna Cabral	Nominated	
