= Enchong Dee (album) =

Studio album by Enchong Dee
- Released: October 7, 2014
- Genre: OPM, Pop
- Language: Filipino, English
- Label: Star Music

Enchong Dee is the self-titled debut album of Filipino actor Enchong Dee. It was launched nationwide in the Philippines on October 7, 2014 by Star Music, following the grand launch on ASAP 19, a variety show where Dee is a mainstay, Sunday the same week. He promoted the album at various TV shows, radio stations and malls across the country, helping the sales to reach gold and platinum status later on. Dee's main musical influences range from ’90s boybands such as Backstreet Boys and NSYNC, to music icons such as Michael Jackson, Josh Groban and Usher. He dedicated the album to his fans who have been there for him since the beginning of his career.

The first single of the album was "Chinito Problems," a song in response to Yeng Constantino's hit song "Chinito" which she said was dedicated to him. MOR 101.9 premiered the single on August 18, 2014 where the DJ's made the listeners guess who the singer was at first. Dee said that the single was just meant for digital release but he was eventually asked to work on a full album. The music video was released November 7, 2014 on Myx and featured Kapamilya actress Janella Salvador as Dee's love interest. It was directed by Jasper Salimbangon.

The dance track "Seloso" was released as the second single. Dee worked with Bachelor of Arts in Communication and Media Studies students from San Beda College Alabang for the music video which again premiered on Myx on January 17, 2015. Dee said that it's his favorite song off the album.

Dee continued to release two more music videos. The music video for "Step No Step Yes," song originally by VST & Co., featured other Kapamilya heartthrobs Enrique Gil, Gerald Anderson, Rayver Cruz and Xian Lim. It was shot at Bondi Beach in Sydney, Australia when they were touring together for Teleserye Bida in 2014. "Isip O Puso" was one of the two tracks Enchong wrote for the album, with the other not ending up on the album because it didn't fit with the rest of the songs. It was inspired by his movie "Once a Princess" with love team Erich Gonzales. The music video for the song was shot in Chicago and Detroit, with the help of his sibling AJ Dee, while on tour with Vice Ganda.

After almost a year of its release, Enchong's dream to have a concert finally came to reality. He held his first major two night concert entitled DeeTour at Music Museum on July 3 and 10, 2015, with each nights having different guests. He performed his songs from the album as well as some of his personal favorite pop songs.

== Track listing ==
No.	Title	Writers	Length
1	Chinito Problems	Jed Dumawal	4:01
2	Seloso	Jasper Lukban, RB "Kidwolf" Barbaso	3:50
3	Step No Step Yes	Vic Sotto, Joey de Leon	3:55
4	Tambalang OMG (Duet with Alex Gonzaga)	Rox Santos, Jasper Lukban, Nica del Rosario	3:42
5	Isip O Puso	Rox Santos, Jasper Lukban, Enchong Dee	3:35
6	Step No Step Yes (Extended Version)		4:56
7	Chinito Problems (Brian Cua Club Remix)		5:38
8	Chinito Problems (feat. Yeng Constantino)		4:01
9	Chinito Problems (Minus One)		4:01
10	Seloso (Minus One)		3:50
11	Step No Step Yes (Minus One)		3:55
12	Tambalang OMG (Duet with Alex Gonzaga) [Minus One]		3:42
13	Isip O Puso (Minus One)		3:35

== Certifications ==
Country (Provider)	Certifications
Philippines (PARI)	Platinum
