= Always Be My Maybe (disambiguation) =

Always Be My Maybe is a 2019 American romantic-comedy film.

Always Be My Maybe may also refer to:

- Always Be My Maybe (2016 film), 2016 Philippine romantic-comedy film

== See also ==
- "Always Be My Baby", song
