= Maika Rivera =

Filipino actress and tennis player (born 1995)

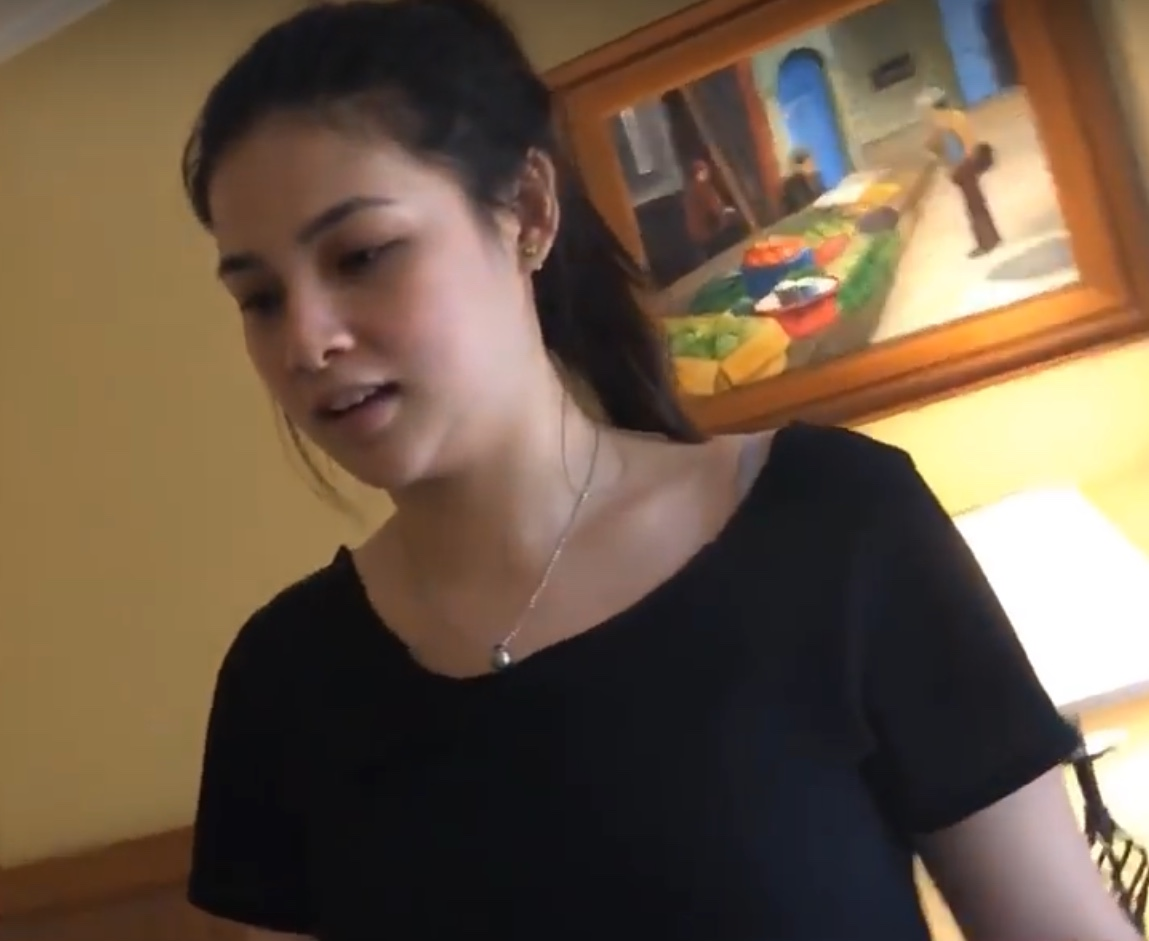
- Born: Maika Jae Rivera Tanpoco; October 27, 1995 (age 31); Angeles City, Pampanga, Philippines
- Occupations: Actress; singer; VJ; dancer; athlete
- Years active: 2016–present
- Agents: Star Magic (2016–present); Brightlight Productions (2020–22)
- Height: 1.70 m (5 ft 7 in)
- Relatives: Melizza Jimenez (sister)
- Tennis career
- Country (sports): Philippines (2000–present)
- Height: 1.70 m (5 ft 7 in)
- Plays: Right-handed (two-handed backhand)

Singles
- Career record: 3-3

Doubles
- Career record: 2-3

Maika Jae Rivera Tanpoco (born October 27, 1995) is a Filipino tennis player and actress. She was one of the few popular tennis players in the Philippines along with Tin Patrimonio.

In 2016, Tanpoco changed her screen name to Maika Rivera as she became a member of Star Magic, an ABS-CBN Talent Agency. She joined the cast of The Blood Sisters as the evil cousin of Erich Gonzales' character.

Rivera started her career as one of the Girltrends of the variety show, It's Showtime, created by ABS-CBN and her villain role in Always Be My Maybe created by Star Cinema. Since then, she became a star magic artist of ABS-CBN and began appearing on their television dramas such as Magpahanggang Wakas, Maalaala Mo Kaya and Ipaglaban Mo!. Previously in 2017, she joined the cast of La Luna Sangre and played the role Malina, the antagonist of the cast. In September 2017, she joined the cast of Wildflower as a recurring guest character Stefanie to Lily (Maja Salvador) and Diego (Joseph Marco). In 2018, Rivera joined the cast of The Blood Sisters as Andrea, the main antagonist of the series. She became famous because of her role of that drama suspense TV series.

== Early life and education ==
Maika Jae Rivera Tanpoco was born on October 27, 1995 in Angeles, Pampanga, Philippines, she grew up in an environment that heavily emphasized physical education alongside academics.

== Career ==
She lost to Marian Capadocia in the finals of Philippine Columbian Association in November 2014.

=== Showbiz career ===
Rivera's film debut is her antagonist role in Always Be My Maybe by Star Cinema, starring Arci Muñoz and Gerald Anderson. She also became a member of Girl Trends on ABS-CBN's noontime show It's Showtime.

=== 2016–17: Drama roles ===
Recently, Rivera made her television acting debut via Magpahanggang Wakas, where she played Chesca Lozado, Jena and Tristan's loving daughter and shared credits with Muñoz, Gelli de Belen and John Estrada. She paired up with Marco Gumabao. Later, after appearing in that show she appeared in some episodes in Maalaala Mo Kaya and played various roles in that show. She was also seen in Ipaglaban Mo! episodes.

=== 2017–present: Main, recurring and villain roles ===
Rivera became a regular guest in It's Showtime and appeared in the show's segment Girltrends as a member, FUNanghalian as a member/leader (Team Girls), Cash-Ya! Kaya! and COPY-CUT. Later, she appeared in La Luna Sangre along with co-stars Kathryn Bernardo, Daniel Padilla, Angel Locsin, Richard Gutierrez and others and she portrayed Malina, a cruel and unsympathetic vampire, Supremo's loyal servant and Malia and Tristan's enemy, Malina dies at the LLU massacre after Malia killed the other evil vampires that kills humans.

Right after La Luna Sangre, she played another recurring role in one of the most watched TV series in Philippines, Wildflower, she portrayed Stefanie Oytengco, Divine's eldest daughter and the one who manages Divine's jewelry shop, in the series her mother (Divine) was kidnapped by Lily Cruz to gain information about Emilia's criminal acts. Later after Lily successfully destroys Emilia's illegal jewelry business. Stefani was killed by Emilia's hired killers along with Divine and her siblings. Later after playing a special recurring role in that series.

She appeared in the Philippine television drama-action-suspense series topbilled by Erich Gonzales in three characters: Erika, Carrie, and Agatha. Produced by Dreamscape Entertainment and directed by Jojo Saguin, that tackles the issue surrogacy, The Blood Sisters along with Erich Gonzales, Ejay Falcon, Enchong Dee, and AJ Muhlach where she played the evil cousin of Erich Gonzales character.

She also appeared as guest cast in several series (FPJ's Ang Probinsyano, The Iron Heart, Pira-Pirasong Paraiso and FPJ's Batang Quiapo.) She also appeared in the 2024 series High Street as one of the recurring cast.

== Off the Court ==
She appeared for Metro magazine with volleyball superstar Alyssa Valdez of Ateneo Lady Eagles and Men's Health Philippines along with another volleyball superstar Cha Cruz, who was included in the Top 100 of FHM Philippines 100 Sexiest Women along with Rachel Anne Daquis.

== Filmography ==
=== Films ===
Year	Title	Role
2016	Always Be My Maybe	Tracy
2018	I Love You, Hater	Sophie
2018	The Girl in the Orange Dress	Honey
2025	Shake, Rattle & Roll Evil Origins	Helga

=== Television ===
Year	Title	Role	Notes	Ref.
2016–2019	It's Showtime	Performer	Girl Trend member	
2016	Magpahanggang Wakas	Cheska Lozado		
2017	La Luna Sangre	Malina		
2017	Wildflower	Stefanie Oytengco		
2018	The Blood Sisters	Andrea Bermudez		
2018	Sana Dalawa ang Puso	Irish		
2018	Ngayon at Kailanman	Tamara "Tam"		
2019	Maalaala Mo Kaya: Wheelchair	Olivia		
2019	Maalaala Mo Kaya: MVP	Karen		
2019	Sandugo	Inez Fajardo		
2020	Bawal na Game Show	Herself	Contestant	
2020	Sunday 'Kada	Herself		
2021	ASAP XP	Herself / Performer		
2021	Init sa Magdamag	Sam		
2021	Magandang Buhay	Herself	Guest	
2021–22	FPJ's Ang Probinsyano	Cassandra Jose		
2022	Maalaala Mo Kaya: Medalyon	Berna		
2023	The Iron Heart	Lea Villanueva		
2023	Pira-Pirasong Paraiso	Elizabeth Barrameda-Paraiso		
2024	High Street	Cynthia		
2024–25	FPJ's Batang Quiapo	Atty. Vera Saldivar		
2025–26	Roja	Rita Prudencio		
2026	Blood vs Duty	young Theresa Reyes		
2026	The Loyalty Game	Carlota Aberin		
2026	Oh My Gan!	Herself	Guest	
2026	Sigabo	Stanny		
