= List of La Vida Lena episodes =

La Vida Lena (transl. The Life of Lena) is a Philippine television drama broadcast by Kapamilya Channel, A2Z and TV5. The fast-cut version was released from November 14, 2020 to January 16, 2021 on iWantTFC. The full series aired from June 28, 2021 to February 4, 2022 on the channel's Primetime Bida evening block, Jeepney TV, A2Z Primetime, TV5's TodoMax Primetime Singko and worldwide via The Filipino Channel.

== Series overview ==
Season	Episodes	Originally released		
Season	Episodes	First released	Last released	Network
1	10	November 14, 2020	January 16, 2021	iWantTFC
2	100	June 28, 2021	November 12, 2021	Kapamilya Channel
3	60	November 15, 2021	February 4, 2022	Kapamilya Channel

- iWantTFC shows two episodes first in advance before its television broadcast starting with the second season.

== Episodes ==
=== Fast cut (2020–2021) ===
No.	Title	Original release date
1	"Buy Her Out!"	November 14, 2020
Magda is a simple and kind-hearted girl who grew up bearing a big scar on her face. Despite living a life filled with mockery and discrimination, Magda focuses on her studies and eventually manages to start up her own soap business in hopes of securing a better life for her and her beloved grandfather. She hits the jackpot when her product quickly gains popularity in Salvacion. Learning about Magda's success, the owners of a big cosmetic company give the young lady a generous offer in exchange for her organic soap formula.
2	"Man to the Rescue"	November 21, 2020
Standing on her dignity, Magda turns down Royal Wellness' business proposal. Unbeknownst to the young lady, her fearless decision displeases the Narcisos, bringing about serious consequences for her and her loved ones. Magda's series of bad luck seems to come to a halt when a new friend and a deal from Royal Wellness' top competitor come knocking at her door.
3	"Lured to Love"	November 28, 2020
Despite Miguel's efforts to mislead her investigation, Magda remains determined to discover the culprit behind their barrio's ruined crops. Her doubts about Miguel's intentions, however, vanish into thin air as she falls for the young man's tricks. Magda soon lets Miguel join her contract signing with Blue Velvet, completely unaware of the bigger problems his presence will bring not only to her business but also to her relationship with her loved ones.
4	"Cruel Intentions"	December 5, 2020
Magda deals with an unexpected predicament upon discovering that she is pregnant with Miguel's child. In her attempt to reconnect with Miguel to inform him about her pregnancy, Magda learns that his kindness is all a fraud plotted by the Narcisos to acquire her soap's formula. Magda's determination to fight the Narcisos head on, however, is met with tragedy.
5	"A New Ally"	December 12, 2020
The Narcisos' scheme to get rid of Magdalena so they can be free to use Magda's soap formula that they stole.Magda ends up in jail where she meets Ramona Joaquin, a co- inmate whom she discovers was also a victim of the wickedness of Narcisos. Unknowingly, Magda finds a potential ally in her fight for justice.
6	"Another Tragedy"	December 19, 2020
Deeming Magda's pregnancy as a threat to their plans, Lukas urges Vanessa to take action immediately and nip the problem in the bud. Soon enough, Magda plunges into despair as another tragedy befalls her in the confines of the cell. While Jordan and Kiko exhaust all means to help the humble soap maker seek justice, misfortune follows their loved ones.
7	"Free at Last!"	December 26, 2020
After serving her time in jail, Magda finally reunites with Jordan and his family. However, she cuts their joyful reunion short when she decides to leave for Manila to start anew and to search for Ramona, expecting to find a reliable ally in her fight against the Narcisos. Meanwhile, Miguel works like a dog, aiming for a position in the Royal Wellness' board.
8	"The Transformation"	January 2, 2021
In Magdalena’s attempt to revive her soap business together with Ramona, she ends up at the receiving end of the Narcisos' wickedness once more. Fortunately, another ally comes knocking at her door. However, Lukas and Vanessa are already one step ahead, leaving Magda at a greater disadvantage. As the humble soap maker wallows in dejection, Ramona pushes Magda to grab the opportunity to transform into a worthy competitor and put herself on equal footing with their rivals.
9	"Ready for Revenge"	January 9, 2021
Magda returns to Salvacion with a beautiful face and a mind focused solely on revenge. She then reconnects with Jordan and Betchay to form a dependable team who will be joining her in her plan to take down the Narcisos. After finding her enemies’ weakness, Magda prepares to engage with Adrian and use him to enter the Narcisos’ lair.
10	"The Battle Begins"	January 16, 2021
Lena successfully puts Adrian under her spell with her seductive pretense. Despite giving his complete support for Lena’s plans, Jordan cannot help but be concerned about her safety. Meanwhile, M&R gains popularity and poses a threat to Royal Wellness’ reign in Salvacion. This leads to the Narcisos’ desperation to know more about their new competitor, not knowing that the person behind it is their old enemy.

=== TV broadcast (2021) ===
==== Season 2 ====
No. overall	No. in season	Title	Original release date	AGB Nielsen Ratings (NUTAM People)
1	1	"Simula ng Laban"	June 28, 2021	N/A
Magda is a simple and kind-hearted girl who grew up bearing a big scar on her face. Because of this, Rachel, one of Magda's bullies, orchestrates violent vengeance after the latter toppled the former from academic top spot.
2	2	"Inggitera"	June 29, 2021	N/A
Magda’s attempt to get back at Rachel ends in vain when her bullying complaint falls on deaf ears. Soon, she is left with no choice but to attend her upcoming graduation ball after a friend volunteered to be her date.
3	3	"Nagpaganda"	June 30, 2021	N/A
As Rachel and the bullies spoil Magda's graduation ball, Jordan finds a way to make her night special. Magda soon brims with joy upon learning of her high academic standing. However, an unforeseen change in the ranking brings her to tears.
4	4	"Valedictorian"	July 1, 2021	N/A
After Rachel bribed her way to reclaiming the valedictorian award, Magda gets even by using her talent in chemicals to ruin the former's graduation dress. This incident, however, pushes Lukas to give Magda a grave threat.
5	5	"Magda's Magic Soap"	July 2, 2021	N/A
Magda’s organic soap finds a foothold after a social media celebrity promoted its efficacy. Because of this, the Narcisos, in a bid to save their company, give Magda a generous offer in exchange for her soap formula.
6	6	"Danyos"	July 5, 2021	N/A
Vanessa's persistence in convincing Magda to accept her business proposal gets her into a predicament. Blaming Magda, the Narciso matriarch retaliates. Meanwhile, Kiko grows worried about his son's career.
7	7	"Desperado"	July 6, 2021	N/A
The Narcisos use Vanessa’s predicament to force Magda into selling her soap formula to them. Soon, the authorities arrest Dado. Not wanting to see her grandfather suffer, Magda arrives at an important decision.
8	8	"Pagsuyo"	July 7, 2021	N/A
Magda helps a mysterious man who previously saved her from peril. Commissioner Conrad launches an investigation after discovering that the fields have been poisoned.
9	9	"Sundan"	July 8, 2021	N/A
Adrian explains to Lukas and Vanessa why he poisoned Sitio Banal’s fields. Miguel bares his strategy to get the magic soap’s formula as he shares his reason for helping Royal Wellness.
10	10	"Kutob"	July 9, 2021	N/A
Magda grows suspicious about Miguel’s motive in befriending her. Miguel then fabricates a story to keep her trust. Later, Miguel questions the Narcisos’ reason for coveting Magda’s magic soap formula.
11	11	"Balakid"	July 12, 2021	N/A
Concerned for his friend, Jordan decides to go to Manila to accompany Magda. After successfully stopping Magda from signing a deal with Blue Velvet, Miguel uses his cunning and charm to enchant the young and naive soap maker.
12	12	"Tiwala"	July 13, 2021	N/A
Falling head over heels for him, Magda turns a blind eye to the obvious red flags as she chooses to put her trust in Miguel. Jordan gains a valuable information that may lead to the culprit behind the poisoning of Sitio Banal’s fields.
13	13	"Naglaho"	July 14, 2021	N/A
As the Narcisos pressure him to get Magda’s magic soap formula, Miguel comes up with a plan and decides to keep his distance from her for a while. Magda’s world starts crumbling down when she discovers the result of her and Miguel's actions.
14	14	"Manloloko"	July 15, 2021	N/A
As she attempts to tell Miguel about her pregnancy, Magda is heartbroken to discover the lies woven by the Narcisos. Casting Miguel out of their plan, Lukas and Vanessa summon an ally for one last job.
15	15	"Nasawi"	July 16, 2021	N/A
With her heart torn into pieces following Dado’s death, Magda vows to do everything to make the Narcisos pay. Hearing about the fire incident, Miguel grows concerned for his child with Magda.
16	16	"Nakulong"	July 19, 2021	N/A
Magda gets imprisoned for direct assault after aggressively driving out the Narcisos at Dado’s wake. With Magda out of the way, Vanessa is now free to produce the magic soap to save Royal Wellness from downfall.
17	17	"Pabor"	July 20, 2021	N/A
Seeing the politics and power play at the Narcisos, Rachel urges Miguel to keep proving himself to Lukas. In his attempt to save a woman, Jordan gets in trouble with Adrian. Puzzled about one of her cellmates, Magda asks Jordan and Betchay a favor.
18	18	"Dalaw"	July 21, 2021	N/A
Wanting to give his child a better future, Miguel visits Magda and expresses his desire to take their baby once it is born, much to Lukas' displeasure. With Jordan's help, Magda gains information about Ramona’s connection with the Narcisos.
19	19	"Hinagpis"	July 22, 2021	N/A
Jordan helps Kiko find a lead in the investigation on the fire that engulfed Magda’s house. Not wanting to have any connection with Magda, Lukas tells Vanessa to deal with the young woman’s unborn child. Later, an incident causes Magda immense grief.
20	20	"Karamay"	July 23, 2021	N/A
Miguel confronts the Narcisos and makes them admit having a hand on the murder of his unborn child with Magda. As the desire of exacting revenge grows in Magda, Jordan helps in tracking down the person who poisoned her.
21	21	"Kasunduan"	July 26, 2021	N/A
Now that his family is being targeted and harassed, Jordan vows to help Magda make the Narcisos pay for their crimes. Before regaining her freedom, Ramona opens up to Magda about the nightmare that has been haunting her for 20 years.
22	22	"Nakalaya"	July 27, 2021	N/A
With Miguel's efforts, Royal Wellness avoids bankruptcy and rises back up as the country’s most trusted brand. Leaving prison behind, Magda wastes no time and makes a decision that surprises her loved ones.
23	23	"Pagtatago"	July 28, 2021	N/A
Confident that his promotion is within reach, Miguel returns to the Philippines. Failing to land a job because of her criminal record, Magda begins searching for the only person who can help her get back at the Narcisos.
24	24	"Bagong Buhay"	July 29, 2021	N/A
With his new position at stake, Adrian comes up with a way to silence Miguel. Seeing how reality crushed Ramona’s fire, Magda shoots for the moon in hopes of rising from the ashes.
25	25	"Kalaban"	July 30, 2021	N/A
Magda seethes with anger and frustration upon realizing that the Narcisos’ desire to get hold of her formula was the reason for all her plights. While Ramona convinces her not to make rash decisions, Magda gains an unexpected ally.
26	26	"Paratang"	August 2, 2021	N/A
In a bid to turn the tide against their enemies, the Narcisos play the victim as they publicly discredit Magda and Blue Velvet. Tired of being punished because of her skin anomaly, Magda reaches a life changing decision.
27	27	"Goodbye, Magda"	August 3, 2021	N/A
With burning determination to get back at the Narcisos, Magda says goodbye to her old face. After starting a new corporation in order to topple Royal Wellness, Ramona urges Magda to go back to her roots as the latter creates a new soap.
28	28	"Satin Dream"	August 4, 2021	N/A
After distributing their new soap called Satin Dream, Magda and Ramona visit their new office and homes in Salvacion. Jordan uses his newfound skills to sabotage a crucial part of Royal Wellness’ operations.
29	29	"Plano"	August 5, 2021	N/A
Alarmed over Royal Wellness’ losses, Lukas blames Miguel for the failed deliveries. Treading the path of revenge, Magda sheds off her former self along with her inhibitions as she and her allies hatch a plan to infiltrate the Narcisos.
30	30	"Nabighani"	August 6, 2021	N/A
Putting up a more refined disposition, Magda succeeds in gaining Adrian’s interest. However, her true identity threatens to be exposed when Adrian accidentally discovers that she is connected to M&R.
31	31	"Koneksyon"	August 9, 2021	N/A
After successfully protecting her cover, Magda gives Jordan ample time to hack Adrian’s phone. With valuable information at hand, M&R Corporation begins planning to counter Royal Wellness’ upcoming skincare line.
32	32	"Pikunan"	August 10, 2021	N/A
Gatecrashing M&R Corporation’s launch, Lukas and Vanessa get shocked upon meeting their newest rival. While sneaking out of the venue, Magda is put in a precarious position when Adrian catches a glimpse of her.
33	33	"Pabagsakin"	August 11, 2021	N/A
Magda offers Ramona a shoulder to lean on as the latter succumbs to sadness following her heated confrontation with the Narcisos. Knowing that he cannot underestimate his new rival, Lukas begins hatching a plot to bring down M&R Corporation.
34	34	"Abala"	August 12, 2021	N/A
Vanessa grows concerned as Adrian puts his new girl over the crisis Royal Wellness is facing. Magda comes up with a way to further entrance and trap Adrian in her orbit.
35	35	"Pag-ibig"	August 13, 2021	N/A
Magda unearths Adrian’s weaknesses to get into his head. First, she makes use of his insecurities to completely win him over. Meanwhile, Rambo gets to spend more time with Alice.
36	36	"Pakay"	August 16, 2021	N/A
While looking for Adrian, Miguel learns that the girl who has been keeping his cousin preoccupied is none other than Magda. With their plans on the line, Ramona and Magda devise a plan to stop Miguel from divulging his discovery to the Narcisos.
37	37	"Posisyon"	August 17, 2021	N/A
Dismayed that his uncle is turning a blind eye to his efforts, Miguel decides not to tell Lukas his discovery. Trying to remedy the situation, Magda resolves to tell Adrian the truth, only to be stopped by a surprising development.
38	38	"Sabwatan"	August 18, 2021	N/A
Visiting M&R Corporation for the first time, Kiko warns Ramona about the dangers of going up against the Narcisos. Knowing that Adrian will still get favored by Lukas despite his lapses, Miguel decides to connive with Magda.
39	39	"Pagtatapat"	August 19, 2021	N/A
Adamant in seeking justice, Kiko vows to never let Brian get away with the crimes he committed. Unsatisfied with Adrian’s confession, Magda comes up with a way to seal the Narciso poster boy in the palm of her hand.
40	40	"Desisyon"	August 20, 2021	N/A
Magda wraps Adrian around her fingers as she convinces him that she is pregnant with his child. With this, Adrian makes a big decision. While her allies find the turn of events undue, Magda sees it as a perfect chance to fulfill her lifelong mission.
41	41	"The Fiance"	August 23, 2021	N/A
The Narcisos are shocked to the core upon learning that Adrian’s fiancée is none other than Magda. Hitting two birds with one stone, Magda also manages to damage Miguel’s relationship with Rachel through her appalling revelations.
42	42	"Dahas"	August 24, 2021	N/A
43	43	"Alas"	August 25, 2021	N/A
44	44	"Reputasyon"	August 26, 2021	N/A
45	45	"Bwelta"	August 27, 2021	N/A
46	46	"Banta"	August 30, 2021	N/A
47	47	"Hinala"	August 31, 2021	N/A
48	48	"Panganib"	September 1, 2021	N/A
49	49	"Pakana"	September 2, 2021	N/A
50	50	"Ipagtanggol"	September 3, 2021	N/A
51	51	"Baliktarin"	September 6, 2021	N/A
52	52	"Promosyon"	September 7, 2021	N/A
53	53	"Duda"	September 8, 2021	N/A
54	54	"Eskandalo"	September 9, 2021	N/A
55	55	"Sigurista"	September 10, 2021	N/A
56	56	"Alyansa"	September 13, 2021	N/A
57	57	"Balita"	September 14, 2021	N/A
58	58	"Kasinungalingan"	September 15, 2021	N/A
59	59	"Ama"	September 16, 2021	N/A
60	60	"Selosa"	September 17, 2021	N/A
61	61	"Depensa"	September 20, 2021	N/A
62	62	"Panlaban"	September 21, 2021	N/A
63	63	"Suspetsa"	September 22, 2021	N/A
64	64	"Protektahan"	September 23, 2021	N/A
65	65	"Takutin"	September 24, 2021	N/A
66	66	"Suhol"	September 27, 2021	N/A
67	67	"Simpatiya"	September 28, 2021	N/A
68	68	"Takot"	September 29, 2021	N/A
69	69	"Trabaho"	September 30, 2021	N/A
70	70	"Kapitbahay"	October 1, 2021	N/A
71	71	"Imbestiga"	October 4, 2021	N/A
72	72	"Hiwalayan"	October 5, 2021	N/A
73	73	"Relasyon"	October 6, 2021	N/A
74	74	"Batas"	October 7, 2021	N/A
75	75	"Pagkukulang"	October 8, 2021	N/A
76	76	"Kalaguyo"	October 11, 2021	N/A
77	77	"Pagkakamali"	October 12, 2021	N/A
78	78	"Resulta"	October 13, 2021	N/A
79	79	"Pakiusap"	October 14, 2021	N/A
80	80	"Panloloko"	October 15, 2021	N/A
81	81	"Kaliwaan"	October 18, 2021	N/A
82	82	"Kaibigan"	October 19, 2021	N/A
83	83	"Desperada"	October 20, 2021	N/A
84	84	"Kompetisyon"	October 21, 2021	N/A
85	85	"Pursigido"	October 22, 2021	N/A
86	86	"Panira"	October 25, 2021	N/A
87	87	"Ideya"	October 26, 2021	N/A
88	88	"Kwento"	October 27, 2021	N/A
89	89	"Pagtatangka"	October 28, 2021	N/A
90	90	"Divorce"	October 29, 2021	N/A
91	91	"Bisita"	November 1, 2021	N/A
92	92	"Kumpronta"	November 2, 2021	N/A
93	93	"Manipula"	November 3, 2021	N/A
94	94	"Sorpresa"	November 4, 2021	N/A
95	95	"Katotohanan"	November 5, 2021	N/A
96	96	"Taksil"	November 8, 2021	N/A
97	97	"Sikreto"	November 9, 2021	N/A
98	98	"Utos"	November 10, 2021	N/A
99	99	"Kapalit"	November 11, 2021	N/A
100	100	"Damay"	November 12, 2021	N/A

==== Season 3 ====
No. overall	No. in season	Title	Original release date	AGB Nielsen Ratings (NUTAM People)
101	1	"Paslangin"	November 15, 2021	N/A
102	2	"Kakampi"	November 16, 2021	2.9%
103	3	"Tuliro"	November 17, 2021	2.6%
104	4	"Traydor"	November 18, 2021	2.7%
105	5	"Tauhan"	November 19, 2021	2.5%
106	6	"Nobya"	November 22, 2021	2.5%
107	7	"Suspek"	November 23, 2021	2.5%
108	8	"Dakip"	November 24, 2021	N/A
109	9	"Problemado"	November 25, 2021	N/A
110	10	"Nakaraan"	November 26, 2021	3.0%
111	11	"Kundisyon"	November 29, 2021	N/A
112	12	"Blackmail"	November 30, 2021	N/A
113	13	"Laglagan"	December 1, 2021	2.4%
114	14	"Kamalasan"	December 2, 2021	N/A
115	15	"Kumpirmado"	December 3, 2021	2.3%
116	16	"Oportunidad"	December 6, 2021	N/A
117	17	"Balak"	December 7, 2021	2.5%
118	18	"Pagbigyan"	December 8, 2021	N/A
119	19	"Pamilya"	December 9, 2021	2.6%
120	20	"Ebidensya"	December 10, 2021	2.6%
121	21	"Ambisyosa"	December 13, 2021	2.7%
122	22	"Aksidente"	December 14, 2021	2.4%
123	23	"Bunyag"	December 15, 2021	2.5%
124	24	"Palayasin"	December 16, 2021	N/A
125	25	"Seguridad"	December 17, 2021	N/A
126	26	"Pasalamatan"	December 20, 2021	N/A
127	27	"Pagbabayad"	December 21, 2021	2.6%
128	28	"Paninisi"	December 22, 2021	2.8%
129	29	"Paraan"	December 23, 2021	N/A
130	30	"Tulong"	December 24, 2021	N/A
131	31	"Testigo"	December 27, 2021	N/A
132	32	"Gamitan"	December 28, 2021	N/A
133	33	"Heredera"	December 29, 2021	N/A
134	34	"Susi"	December 30, 2021	N/A
135	35	"Paniwala"	December 31, 2021	N/A
136	36	"Karma"	January 3, 2022	N/A
137	37	"Preso"	January 4, 2022	N/A
138	38	"Pagbabalik"	January 5, 2022	2.4%
139	39	"Tanggal"	January 6, 2022	N/A
140	40	"Lason"	January 7, 2022	2.4%
141	41	"Kaarawan"	January 10, 2022	N/A
142	42	"Karga"	January 11, 2022	N/A
143	43	"Motibo"	January 12, 2022	N/A
144	44	"Nasawi"	January 13, 2022	N/A
145	45	"Pagluluksa"	January 14, 2022	2.9%
146	46	"Dawit"	January 17, 2022	N/A
147	47	"Tagapagmana"	January 18, 2022	N/A
148	48	"Utang"	January 19, 2022	N/A
149	49	"Bankrupt"	January 20, 2022	N/A
150	50	"Martir"	January 21, 2022	N/A
151	51	"Huli"	January 24, 2022	N/A
152	52	"Sinungaling"	January 25, 2022	N/A
153	53	"Transaksyon"	January 26, 2022	2.9%
154	54	"Bomba"	January 27, 2022	2.9%
155	55	"Malaya"	January 28, 2022	2.9%
156	56	"Pananagutan"	January 31, 2022	3.1%
157	57	"Wanted"	February 1, 2022	3.9%
158	58	"Ganid"	February 2, 2022	3.0%
159	59	"Hulihin"	February 3, 2022	N/A
160	60	"Hustisya"	February 4, 2022	2.9%

- This program airs nationally on a cable channel/pay TV which normally has a relatively smaller audience compared to free-to-air TV/public broadcasters.
