= The Blood Sisters (TV series) =

2018 Philippine television drama series

- Genre: Romance; Family drama; Crime; Mystery; Action
- Created by: ABS-CBN Studios; Reggie Amigo; Rondel P. Lindayag
- Developed by: ABS-CBN Studios
- Written by: Clarissa Estuar-Navarro; Mariami Tanangco-Domingo; Jurey Mirafuentes
- Directed by: Jojo A. Saguin; Roderick P. Lindayag; Manny Q. Palo
- Starring: Erich Gonzales; Enchong Dee; Ejay Falcon; AJ Muhlach; Jake Cuenca; Dina Bonnevie; Jestoni Alarcon; Cherry Pie Picache; Maika Rivera
- Music by: Jessie Lasaten
- Opening theme: "Ako'y Ako" by Aegis
- Composer: Sunot Sisters
- Country of origin: Philippines
- Original language: Filipino
- No. of seasons: 2
- No. of episodes: 132 (list of episodes)

Production
- Executive producers: Carlo Katigbak; Cory Vidanes; Laurenti Dyogi; Roldeo T. Endrinal
- Producers: Catherine Grace Abarrando; Roselle Soldao-Ganaban; Carlina D. Dela Merced; Julie Anne R. Benitez
- Production locations: Davao City; Manila; Baguio, Benguet; Tanay, Rizal; Batangas
- Cinematography: Jafet Tutanes
- Editors: Roy Francia; Emerson Torres
- Running time: 30–45 minutes
- Production company: Dreamscape Entertainment Television

Original release
- Network: ABS-CBN
- Release: February 12 – August 17, 2018

The Blood Sisters is a 2018 Philippine television drama romance series broadcast by ABS-CBN. Directed by Jojo A. Saguin, Roderick P. Lindayag and Manny Q. Palo, it stars Erich Gonzales. It aired on the network's Primetime Bida line up and worldwide on TFC from February 12 to August 17, 2018, replacing Wildflower and was replaced by Meteor Garden.

== Plot ==
This fictional story follows the lives of triplets, separated as infants, and the complex events that bring them together. The main story line revolves around Erika Castillo, an exotic dancer in a club in Davao City. She works as an entertainer to help provide for her son's medical bills, but her job exposes her to the seedy darkness and dangers of the business, and one evening she witnesses a waitress murder a syndicate member in the club's private dancing room. The killer, known only as Ana Cruz quickly disappears and the syndicate is eager to retrieve a ledger they think Erika took. Greg (Ian de Leon) send his henchmen to silence her.

With her life and her son's safety at risk, Erika leaves him with her friend Bruce (Ogie Diaz) and escapes to Manila. With the help of her best friend Tonio (Ejay Falcon), she searches for "Ana" and the ledger. The assassins catch up with her in Manila, but she manages to escape and Fate hurls another woman along their path. The woman, Carrie Almeda, is a dead ringer for Erica, and the killers mistake her for Erika. They shoot and abduct her. Meanwhile, Erika finds herself assuming her double's identity, hiding under the safety net of Carrie Almeda's world for a brief time.

27 years ago, a childless couple, Debbie and Norman Almeda (Dina Bonnevie and Jestoni Alarcon) hire Adele (Cherry Pie Picache), their housekeeper, to serve as surrogate mother to carry their fertilized eggs in her womb. What originally started as a Surrogacy Agreement between Adele and the couple falls through when Adele suffers a miscarriage. With no viable fertilized eggs left for another In vitro fertilisation and desperate for a child, Norman seduces Adele and gets her pregnant again. They continue the surrogacy charade, with Debbie none the wiser, but Adele changes her mind shortly before she delivers and escapes from the Almedas. Unaware that Adele gives birth to triplets, Norman hires men to get their child back as he undertakes a search himself. Norman tracks Adele in Davao City and takes the infant Agnes away from her arms. By a cruel twist of fate, Almeda's men snatch the other infant, Almira, from Adele's mother at the wet market nearby. Norman assumes his men made a mistake and notifies them that he already has the infant, so the kidnappers leave Almira in an empty carton in a garbage dump.

For the next 26 years the triplets Almira, Agnes and Agatha (all played by Erich Gonzales) live separate lives with no idea about each other. Agnes is renamed Carrie, and raised by the wealthy Almedas in Santa Rosa, Laguna and grows up in affluence. She is a sophisticated, highly educated and accomplished professional with a medical degree in obstetrics and gynecology from Sweden.

On the other hand, Almira's life is diametrically different because the infant is abandoned in the streets, is fostered by a Tanod (a Barangay or Barrio Police Enforcer) in Davao City and grows up in extreme poverty. Almira is renamed Erika, simple and kind, but having not gone past high school, is not able to get out of the poverty she grew up in. To augment her income to meet her son's medical needs, she works as a stripper and lives in the seedy world of criminals.

On the opposite side of their family spectrum, the third infant grows up as lost as her other siblings. While many would invariably assume that Agatha, the only infant left with Adele, was the most fortunate of the triplet, the truth is far from everyone's assumptions.

After the kidnapping, Adele moves to Benguet with her mother and the remaining baby. Although Agatha is raised by her grandmother in middle class comfort, she resents her absent mother, who works as an OFW in Dubai for the past 26 years. Agatha grows up never lacking for material needs. She is private school educated, but she was constantly bullied by her upper class, rich classmates who looked down at her and her mother's job as a maid. The bullying drives her sociopathic personality to achieve a much higher status in life. Her anger increases when she meets her sisters, living in the upper echelon of society, a status she feels she was deprived. In contrast to her two sisters, Agatha is narcissistic, mean spirited, entitled, and takes her comfortable life in Baguio for granted and desires to escape to Manila for a more glamorous, upscale life.

Back in the Bermudez-Almeda mansion in Santa Rosa, Erika ends the charade when she learns that Carrie is getting married in two weeks to Dr. Samuel Hechanova (Enchong Dee), and that Carrie is an obstetrician for the Bermudez Medical Center, a large Medical and Infertility facility owned by her family. The idea that she can pretend to be an Obstetrician and gynecologist appalls her.

The siblings' lives collide when Erika leaves the safety of Carrie's life and runs away. That same night, in a heavily guarded location in Tanay, Rizal, Carrie wakes up from a coma and using her skills as a physician, sutures her gunshot wound and escapes her captors. Fate brings the sisters together and Carrie utilizes their medical facility to determine if they are related. A DNA test using a blood sample from Erika's scarf confirms they are twins. The twins return to their respective families, agreeing to keep their relationship secret while Carrie figures out the truth. Using Carrie's private condo as their meeting place, they spend time getting acquainted and discover that despite their contrasting lives, they both share an unexplained sadness and emptiness. Erika points out Carrie's controlling mother and cold grandmother pales in comparison to Erika's life in the streets, a baby left in the dump without any birth certificate as she passed through the hands of several foster parents.

Meanwhile, Erika's search for Anna Cruz leads to the morgue and a dead end, and the syndicate focuses on Erika. Carrie, on the other hand, seeks answers from her mother who finally admits to the surrogacy but knows nothing about a Multiple birth. Carrie reveals Erika's existence to the Almedas, who are shocked but overjoyed that they have twins. Learning that Erika's life is in danger, she moves into the Almeda mansion with her son Jolo and friend Bruce. But life in a significantly more comfortable surrounding is not as easy as she expected. Grandmother Rosemarie and cousin Andrea are suspicious of her.

Unknown to Debbie and Norman, in a secluded estate in Batangas owned by Deborah's family, exists a sinister secret, a luxurious facility covering for a baby farm called Paraiso. The farm's secret operations is run by Dr. Rosemarie Bermudez (Tessie Tomas) and the Solomon syndicate, the same syndicate looking for Erika and the ledger that would threaten to blow up their entire operations. Paraiso hides beneath their fertility centre, which when discovered, will complicate and imperil the triplets' lives.

While the twins are curious to meet the woman who carried them, that project takes a back seat to Norman's and Deborah's desire for Erika's immediate integration into the Bermudez-Almeda family, legally adopting Erika and her son Jolo. It is at this time that Fate hurls yet another thunderbolt. The twins discover they have a third sibling.

Adele's world in Baguio shatters when Agatha discovers she is one of triplet siblings. Angry at her mother for keeping this information from her, Agatha escapes to Manila and finds her lost siblings but their reunion is far from happy. Despite being welcomed into the Almeda family, Agatha is not content. She desires to own their wealthy life, a lifestyle she feels robbed of, a life she feels entitled to. Agatha's sociopathic personality turns her against the people who love her, as she undermines her siblings and sets out to take the Almedas' and Bermudez' fortune and destroy them completely.

The Bermudez-Almeda family relationships disintegrate as Agatha stirs up conflict and division, when she teams up with Rocco (Jake Cuenca), Fabian (Dante Rivero)'s bastard. They expose the Solomon syndicate and shut down Paraiso. The exposure and capture of the Solomons exposes Rosemarie's connection with their illegal activities, effectively stripping her of her medical license, and her status in the medical industry.

While Rosemarie loses her medical license and the Solomons are in prison serving time, Agatha and Rocco take over the syndicate's leadership. The lucrative baby farming is replaced with Child trafficking for Organ harvesting, selling children as organ donors. They recruit an unlikely ally, Dr. Rosemarie Bermudez, who is eager to get her hands on the fortune she lost. With the growing demand for organ harvesting, the pair use Rosemarie's doctor skills to medically screen the captive children and provide certification of their viable human organs for their international clientele.

Jolo, Erika's son, is kidnapped by Fabian & Greg and later by Rocco's syndicate and then later sold to a foreigner organ buyer for his dying son. The transaction and exchange was successful and Jolo would have been lost forever. But Erika does not give up. She fights the organ buyer with all her ferocity, uses all her street smarts, finds him, and rescues him from the syndicate.

While Jolo recovers from the trauma of his kidnapping, Erika and her family recognize the significance of Jolo's testimony. She agrees for him to becomes a material witness against the syndicate. Erika is able to piece together the information she has gathered and connects the dots to Rocco and Agatha. Rocco convinces Agatha to assassinate her Sister and nephew, but she loses her nerve. Rocco attempts to do it himself but shoots Carrie instead as she spots him in the window, taking the bullet meant for her sister as she tries to warn and block Carrie.

While Carrie fights for her life, Agatha is conflicted after seeing Carrie in the hospital and overhears Rocco tell Sahara (Nathalie Hart) he is merely playing Agatha. In retaliation, Agatha steals all their money. Meanwhile, Jolo's testimony on the woman doctor who tends to the kidnapped children and a girl with a tattoo on her ankle leads Authorities to Dr. Rosemarie and Agatha, and both are captured and incarcerated. He also positively identifies Rocco, who is fighting another war with the escaped convicts Solomons. All are bent on their revenges against one another, and after the money Agatha hid. They capture Agatha and torture her.

Soon after Carrie wakes up from her coma and reveals a masked man attempted to shoot Erika. Greg Solomon decides to go abroad with Ginny (Francine Diaz) to keep her away from danger, leaving Fabian with his bastard son, Rocco.

Samuel finds and confronts Fabian about his father's death and attempts to shoot him but did not have the stomach to kill. However, he tricked Patron into admitting the truth about Manuel's death, secretly videotaped their conversation. As he escapes with Erika, he, along with Agatha are seriously wounded. During the violent shootout, Erica runs over Sahara and kills her. Rocco mourns his sister's death.

Worrying about Agatha's survival under Rocco's hands, Adele finds the money Agatha hid and arranges for an exchange. Adele brings a portion of the money and offers herself as hostage for Agatha's release. Agatha has to retrieve the rest of the money to save her mother.

Meanwhile, as Samuel lays dying in the hospital, Erika accepts his proposal to marry him. He passes away shortly. Erika, Vida (Pilar Pilapil) and Tessa mourn his untimely death. On the other hand, Agatha asks help from Dante (Thou Reyes) to sneak into their house to get the remaining money.

The three sisters are finally reunited and on the same team. Agatha is touched by the concern and love everyone has towards her as they raised money to meet Rocco's ransom demand, and realizes how much they loved her despite her mistakes. This was the key that turned her around. Determined to return to Rocco to retrieve her mother who was left hostage in her place, the three sisters plan to work together. They all dress in Agatha's persona to intentionally confuse Rocco and his father and discover both were bent on taking the money and run alone.

The two men shoot each other during the crossfire. Rocco survives, but his half brother Greg arrives in time to see Rocco mourning his father, and the two half brothers get into a fight, and Rocco kills him. After a metal beam collapses on him, Rocco is apprehended.

In the finale, the triplets celebrate their birthday in Agatha and Rosemarie's prison cell, with Adele, Debbie, Norman, Tonyo, and Agatha's friends. Tonyo and Carrie also announce their engagement.

== Cast and characters ==
In The Blood Sisters, the story revolves around nine characters who appear in almost every scene. They are the triplets Erika, Carrie and Agatha, separated as infants, who reunite under the most complicated circumstances, and are embroiled in strife and conflicts with one another.

The 3 love interests are Samuel a successful doctor in love with Erika; Rainier, Greg's illegitimate son, and Agatha's lover; Tonyo, Erika's best friend in love with Carrie.

Five characters create the hostility in the story arcs: Agatha, Andrea, Rocco, Fabian, and Greg. Agatha is the triplet who is cunning and evil; Andrea is the triplets' cousin who wants to usurp all the Bermudezes' wealth; Rocco is Fabian's abandoned son who seeks vengeance on his father; Fabian is a merciless syndicate leader who despises his son's deformed face; and Greg is a ruthless syndicate underboss that manhunting a person stole a ledger.

Six other characters incite the ensuing conflicts: Debbie is the triplets’ mother who loses them midway in the series when she learns she is not their biological mother. She blames her loss and unhappiness on Adele, directing her anger towards her throughout. Adele is the triplets’ biological mother whose poor life decisions is the root of the conflict in the story. Equally to blame is Norman, the triplets’ biological father. His deceit adversely impacts everyone's lives. Rosemarie is the Bermudez matriarch, driven by greed and power, destroying lives without any moral conscience. Sahara is Rocco's sister, loyal only to her brother, and despises Agatha. Greg is Rocco's half brother, the ruthless son of Patron. Together with his father, their goal is to eliminate Erika who they blame for their downfall.

=== Central characters ===
Erich Gonzales as 3 roles:

- Erika Castillo
  - Aliases:
    - Erika B. Almeda
    - Almira Magtibay
    - Erika M. Almeda
    - Champagne

The eldest of the triplets. Unlike her twins, Erika lived a dangerous life since her juvenile years. Despite the environment she was in, she remains simple and kind. She was hunted by Greg's henchmen because she stole a ledger.

- Dr. Carrie Ann B. Almeda
  - Aliases:
    - Agnes Magtibay
    - Carrie Ann M. Almeda

The second of the triplets. A sophisticated and loving sister to Erika and daughter to Adele, Norman, and Debbie. Her stepmother, Debbie loved her completely even after she learned that she was not her biological daughter. European-educated and the most successful among her sisters.

- Agatha Magtibay
  - Aliases:
    - Agatha B. Almeda
    - Agatha M. Almeda

The youngest of the triplets. She is resentful, insatiable, and rebellious sister to Carrie & Erika. Agatha has a complicated relationship towards her mother, Adele.

Dr. Samuel Hechanova†
Played by Enchong Dee

A wealthy pediatrician, and Carrie's ex-fiancé, member of the prominent Hechanova family. His family is one of the biggest investors of the Bermudez Medical Center. His father Manuel Hechanova is a co-founder of the hospital. Although he was originally in love with Carrie, he develops feelings for Erika as the story progresses. He helps Erika find her son when Jolo was kidnapped, and later obtains information of Rosemarie's involvement in his father's death. He obtains evidence of Fabian admitting to getting his father killed. He later gets shot by Rocco. He dies in the hospital, but not before proposing to Erika.

Rainier Lacuesta†
Played by AJ Muhlach

Agatha's lover, he is the illegitimate son of the Syndicate's head of operations (Greg). Brenda despises Rainier and wants to take him out of the picture. Rainier is tasked to find Erika and the ledger. He is cunning, manipulative, and arrogant. He later develops feelings for Agatha. He is Rocco's nephew. Later, he, together with Greg's wife (Brenda) and daughters, dies in an ambush planned by Rocco and Sahara.

Antonio "Tonyo" Alipio
Played by Ejay Falcon

Erika's childhood best friend in Manila. Tonyo takes care of Erika's son and Uncle Bruce after Erika flees the syndicate. He finds the Paraiso ledger and gives it to Erika for safekeeping. He later develops feelings for Carrie. In the end, he and Carrie are engaged.

Andrea Bermudez
Played by Maika Rivera

The treacherous socialite cousin of the triplets, with ambitions to steal all Rosemarie's wealth. She is one of the characters in the show that creates the conflict. She hates Rosemarie for maltreating her and her parents and plots to kill Rosemarie and take over her operations. Just like her "cousin" Agatha, Andrea seeks power and wealth but the two characters are constantly in conflict.

Adopted by Dr. Rosemarie Bermudez, she is frustrated by the presence of the triplets, who she considers detriment to her goals. She tries to kill her grandmother and blames the failed deed on Erika. Despite their shared goals, Andrea hates Agatha. Together with her mother, they plan to steal all their family's wealth from the Bermudezes. But she is too late, she admits to Debbie that she pushes Mamita, because she has a loss of help from Rosemarie. Later, she apologizes to Rosemarie, but forgiven.

Rocco Fernandez
Played by Jake Cuenca

Rocco is Sahara's half brother and a criminal. He is the Patron's illegitimate who abandons him when he was still a child due to his severely disfigured face. He has never forgiven his father for abandoning him, and plots to destroy Fabian and his family. Growing into an adult, he undergoes facial reconstruction, resulting into a new face and identity altogether. He is responsible for the explosion that destroys the Paraiso.

He will do everything to take Paraiso from Fabian as revenge. He befriends Erika to gain her trust, and information about the Patron, and secretly partners with Agatha as they plot to take over the baby farm. He successfully executes his first revenge on Fabian by ambushing and killing Greg's family, effectively cutting off the Patron's powerful right-hand man. He successfully bombs Paraiso and takes over the Solomon syndicate, leading the child trafficking and kidnapping ring.

In the end, both Carrie and Erika spray fire on Rocco's face, disfiguring his face again, and he is injured by fallen steel bars. Now he will be jailed in prison forever, suffering the excruciating pain from the amputation of both of his legs after he was injured while fruitlessly dealing with the triplets.

=== Recurring characters ===
- Dr. Deborah Marie "Debbie" Bermudez-Almeda – played by Dina Bonnevie, Rosemarie's only daughter, an obstetrician and fertility expert. She is Norman's wife, unaware of Adele and Norman's deception. Later, she discovers that she is not the triplets' biological mother and plans to seek vengeance against Adele but is torn with her genuine love for Carrie, the infant she raised as her own.
- Adele Magtibay/Manang Celia – the biological mother of the triplets, played by Cherry Pie Picache, Norman's former girlfriend who worked as maid in the Bermudez mansion. She had agreed to a surrogate agreement to carry Deborah's child in exchange for payment to cover her father's hospital bills. She later miscarriages. Norman seduces Adele and gets her pregnant again without Debbie's knowledge. Unwilling to give up the child she is carrying, Adele escapes the Bermudezes and delivers triplets. Adele's character contributes to the conflicts in the story. Her neglect towards Agatha during her formative years resulted to Agatha's sociopathic personality. Her desire to make amends for her mistakes does not sit well with her daughters. The dynamics of her relationship within the Almedas and the Bermudez family is always chaotic and adversarial. In the end, she forgives Agatha and celebrates her birthday in prison.
- Norman Almeda – played by Jestoni Alarcon, the triplets' biological father, Debbie's husband, and Adele's former boyfriend. He kidnaps the infant Carrie from Adele and his men are responsible for losing Erika. Desperate for a child, he seduced Adele after the latter miscarried his and Debbie's child conceived in vitro and carried by Adele as surrogate.
- Dr. Rosemarie "Mamita" Bermudez - played by the veteran actress Tessie Tomas, Deborah's cunning and selfish mother who despises Norman, the triplets, Fabian, Andrea, and Andrea's mother. She is a wealthy and skilled doctor who engages in illegal baby farms with Fabian. Later, she discovers Norman's secret and reveals to Debbie that the triplets are not her real daughters.
- Fabian "Patron" Solomon†, played by the veteran actor Dante Rivero. He is the leader of the syndicate and owner of the illegal baby farm Paraiso. Fabian is cunning and evil, having disowned Rocco, his natural child. He intends to leave his organization to Greg and Rainier when he is gone. He thinks Erika has their ledger and wants to kill her, unaware that the waitress who killed their accountant and stole the ledger was Ana Cruz. He was one of the masterminds alongside Greg behind Jolo's kidnapping. He is killed by his bastard son, Rocco.
- Sahara Fernandez† – played by Nathalie Hart, she is Rocco's half Sister and one of Rocco's moles in Fabian's organization. She befriends Tonyo and Erika to get information about the Bermudezes and the Patron. She is part of Rocco's team who ambushed and killed Rainier and Greg's family. She hates Agatha because of her bad attitude. She told Fabian that Erika caused the delay of the delivery of their illegal business, he retaliates by kidnapping Jolo, Erika's son. Later, Sahara steals the 10 million money and switches it to counterfeit money to make Patron angry at Rosemarie. Later, she and Rocco bomb and destroy Paraiso. She kidnaps Jolo following Rocco's orders, who catches sight of Jolo before he detonated the bomb. They do not return Jolo to Erika, and gives the boy to Emman, Jolo's Father, instead. Erika runs Samuel's car over her while trying to escape with Samuel, killing her.
- Gregorio "Greg" Solomon†, one of the major opposing characters, played by Ian De Leon, he is Rainier's cunning, ruthless and abusive father, Patron's son and Rocco's paternal half brother. He is also the underboss of the illegal syndicate of Patron called Paraiso. He is one of the masterminds alongside Fabian behind Jolo's kidnapping. He plans to seek vengeance because of his wife and family's death. In the end, he is angered when Rocco killed his father, he engaging dueling but he was stabbed to death by Rocco.
- Vida Hechanova, played by the veteran actress Pilar Pilapil, a doctor and a rival of Rosemarie, she is wealthy and Samuel's grandmother. She is against Carrie and Samuel's relationship. She and Erika are friends. Vida is cold and easy to get angry.
- Brenda Solomon† – played by Tanya Garcia, she is Greg's wife and the mother of two daughters with Greg. Brenda is remorseless and cruelly malicious towards Rainier. She perishes during Rocco's ambush.
- Pam – played by Pamu Pamorada, she is Agatha's trusted best friend.
- Bruce – played by Ogie Diaz, he is Erika's best friend and Tonyo's uncle.
- Dante – played by Thou Reyes, a friend to Agatha and Pam, he tolerates Agatha's schemes but sometimes stops it. He likes Agatha.
- Mimi – played by Alora Sasam, one of the Bermudez family servants who dislikes Agatha for her bad attitude. She is also a good friend to Erika.
- Ligaya Magtibay – played by Ruby Ruiz, she is Adele's mother and the triplets grandmother. She raised Agatha when Adele worked as an OFW in other country.
- Tessa Hechanova – played by Dindi Gallardo, Samuel's cold and arrogant mother, she doesn't approve of Carrie and Samuel's relationship. She will do everything to keep her son away from Carrie. Later, she confronts and antagonizes Rosemarie, after Samuel tells her that Rosemarie is also involved in Manuel's death.
- Juancho Dela Cuesta† - played by Sandino Martin, he is one of the members of the syndicate. He was raised by Greg and Fabian, the mastermind of Ana Cruz death and tricked Patron. It is revealed that he is Rocco's ally. He is accidentally killed by Tonyo.
- Ginny Solomon - played by Francine Diaz, the eldest daughter of Greg Solomon who survived the ambush. At first, Ginny is cruel and evil to Erika but later redeems and becomes kind-hearted.
- Hanna Solomon† - played by Cessa Moncera, second daughter of Greg and younger sister of Ginny, she is killed along with Rainer and his girlfriend due to the ambush set by Rocco.
- Condrad – played by Paolo Serrano Patron's bodyguard and one of Greg's henchmen.
- Marcus - played by Mark Marasigan, one of Rocco's men
- Police Insp. Marciano Dela Riva - played by Mike Lloren, who works as Head Agent at National Bureau Investigation

=== Minor characters ===
- Young Agatha/Erika/Carrie – played by Heart Ramos, the juvenile lead character who plays the young Erika, Carrie and the evil Agatha.
- Emman Suarez – played by Patrick Garcia, the egoistic father of Erika's son who abandons them. Later, he returns to get Jolo from Erika.
- Chito† – played by Lander Vera Perez, the syndicate's bookkeeper, killed by Ana Cruz.
- Laura / Ana Cruz† – played by Janice Hung, she murders the accountant to obtain the ledger and is killed by Juancho. She is also a skilled martial artist.
- Maria† — the series minor character played by Mara Lopez, one of the surrogate mothers who tries to escape Paraiso and killed by Fabian.
- Dr. Manuel Hechanova† – played by Ricardo Cepeda, Samuel's father, killed by the syndicate
- Odet – played by John Lapus, Agatha's neighbor in Baguio.
- Lorraine – played by Ana Capri, Rocco and Sahara's mother.
- Young Rocco Fernandez – played by Marco Masa, the series' minor character he played the evil young Rocco.
- Young Sahara Fernandez – played by Angelika Rama, the series' minor character, the young Sahara.

== Broadcast ==
The series originally aired on ABS-CBN from February 12, 2018 to August 17, 2018.

=== Re-runs ===
It aired re-runs on Jeepney TV from December 30, 2019 to March 27, 2020 (replacing the re-runs of Bridges of Love); September 19, 2022 to December 16, 2022 (replacing the re-runs of The General's Daughter); and December 22, 2025 to June 19, 2026 (replacing the re-runs of The Legal Wife) that also aired on ALLTV until January 1, 2026.

== Reception ==
Kantar Media National TV Ratings (5:45PM PST)
Pilot Episode	Finale Episode	Peak	Average
25.2% February 12, 2018	25.4% August 17, 2018	28.1% March 1, 2018	19.0%

== Production ==
=== Conceptualization ===
The original concept of the show is about non-identical twins generally assumed to be played by Erich Gonzales and Louise delos Reyes. However, the production unit decided to go with entertainment head Deo Endrinal's idea of recreating the 1999 hit TV series, and rehashing the subplot of Saan Ka Man Naroroon where Claudine Barretto played triplets with distinct contrasting characteristics. As a result of the concept's drastic change, Erich Gonzales was retained to play the role of the triplets while Louise delos Reyes joined Asintado. The first teaser, launched in December 2017, caught the attention of the public due to the obvious similarity with Claudine's previous show, including casting Cherry Pie Picache, who in both series played the biological mother of the triplets. Jojo Saguin, the director of the series, clarified that while the inspiration of the show is similar, the series will have an additional twist: tackle the issue of surrogacy.

== See also ==
- List of ABS-CBN Studios original drama series
- List of programs broadcast by Jeepney TV
