= Always Be My Maybe (2016 film) =

- Theatrical movie poster
- Directed by: Dan Villegas
- Written by: Patrick Valencia; Jancy E. Nicolas; Pertee Briñas
- Produced by: Charo Santos-Concio; Malou N. Santos
- Starring: Gerald Anderson; Arci Muñoz
- Cinematography: Mycko David
- Edited by: Marya Ignacio
- Music by: Emerzon Texon
- Production company: Star Cinema
- Distributed by: ABS-CBN Film Productions
- Release date: February 24, 2016
- Running time: 113 minutes
- Country: Philippines
- Language: Filipino
- Box office: ₱105 million

Always Be My Maybe is a 2016 Philippine romantic comedy film directed by Dan Villegas and written by Patrick Valencia, Jancy Nicolas, and Pertee Briñas. The film stars Gerald Anderson and Arci Muñoz.

Produced and distributed by ABS-CBN Film Productions, the film was theatrically released on February 24, 2016.

== Plot ==
Jake del Mundo is a handsome boy who comes from a privileged background. After years as a carefree bachelor, he thinks he is now ready to settle down. On the night that he proposes marriage to his long-time girlfriend, Tracy, she finally has had enough of him and dumps him for another man. At the same time, Kristina "Tintin" Paraiso, a make-up artist, idealistically dreams of a nearly "perfect" relationship and believes that the guy she's going out with is about to ask her to marry him. When he doesn't arrive to meet her in the restaurant, she finds out on Facebook that he has already committed himself to another girl, and shares her heartbreak on social media in a video that immediately goes viral.

After six months' time recovering from their failed relationships, Jake and Tintin meet in a beach resort that Jake owns, where Tintin is to work on an out-of-town job as a makeup artist with her colleagues Esang, Ms. Andrè and some friends. When the two cross paths, they end up spending an entire night drinking and talking about their personal lives until dawn. Before they part, they exchange numbers and agree to meet in Manila.

Jake, a hopeless romantic, and the jaded and outspoken Tintin, discovering each has been jilted, end up spending more and more time together. On a night out at a bar, they agree to be each other’s confidant to help find someone better than their exes.

== Cast ==
=== Main cast ===
- Gerald Anderson as Jake Del Mundo – The male protagonist. He is a skirt chasing businessman who is trying to settle down at his age he will eventually meet Tin a complete opposite and a hopeless romantic.
- Arci Muñoz as Kristina "Tintin" Paraiso – A makeup artist and blogger. Her viral videos made her a hot topic on social media on HRT makeup tutorials and her viral video on love advice she will meet her match in Jake who is also a hopeless romantic.

=== Supporting cast ===
- Jane Oineza as Telay
- Cacai Bautista as Esang
- Ricci Chan as Andre
- TJ Trinidad as Carlo
- Tirso Cruz III as Jake's father
- Irma Adlawan as Mila
- Nikki Valdez as Tintin's sister
- Carlo Aquino as Fred
- Matt Evans as Pancho
- Ahron Villena as Mikey
- Pepe Herrera as Bernard
- Jairus Aquino as Tintin's brother
- Victor Silayan as Jeric Valdez
- Maika Rivera as Tracy Jake's ex

== Soundtrack ==
The official theme songs of the film was "Free Fall into Love" performed by Marion Aunor and the classic song of Aegis, "Halik". The song "How Can I" which, also performed by Marion, was also used in the steamy love scene of the movie.
