= Enchong Dee =

Filipino actor, model and host (born 1988)

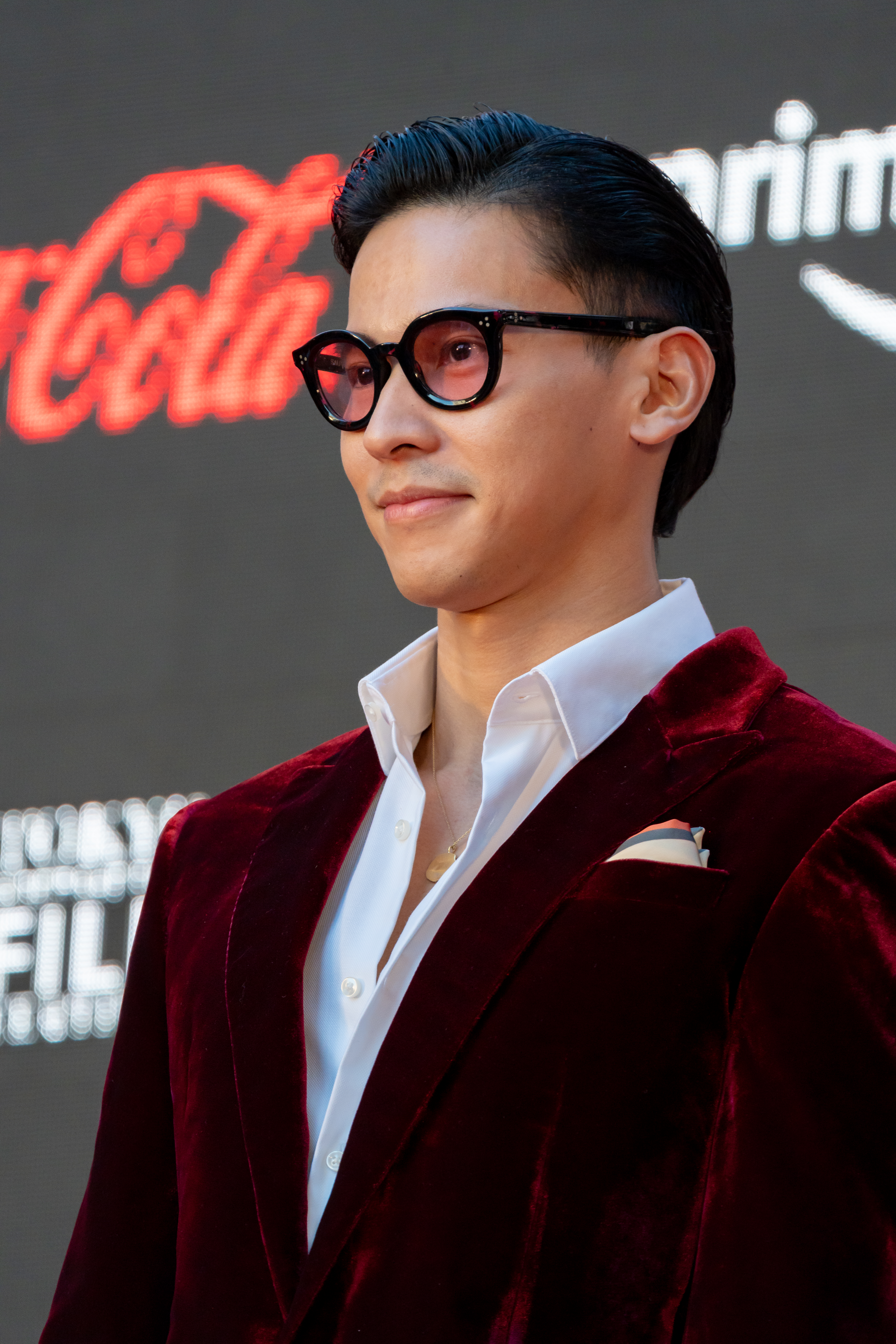
- Dee at the 2023 Tokyo International Film Festival
- Born: Ernest Lorenzo Velasquez Dee; November 5, 1988 (age 37); Naga, Camarines Sur, Philippines
- Education: De La Salle University-Manila
- Occupations: Actor; model; host; swimmer; entrepreneur
- Years active: 2005–present
- Agents: Star Magic (2006–present); Regal Entertainment (2014–present); KP&PR&EMS, Inc. (2006–2022); Lenon Artists Management (2023–present)
- Family: AJ Dee (brother)
- Sports career
- National team: Philippines
- Sport: Swimming
- Events: 100-meter butterfly, 200-meter butterfly
- Strokes: Butterfly
- Club: Philippine Columbian Association Stingrays
- College team: De La Salle University Green Tankers

Ernest Lorenzo "Enchong" Velasquez Dee (Tagalog pronunciation: [ˈentʃɔŋ di], born November 5, 1988) is a Filipino swimmer, actor, performer, model, host and entrepreneur. Dee is a contract artist of ABS-CBN's Star Magic, and came to prominence after starring in the TV drama Katorse in 2009. He is the younger brother of actor and model, AJ Dee.

== Early life and education ==
Enchong Dee was born on November 5, 1988, at Mother Seton Hospital in Naga, Camarines Sur, to Johnson Molina Dee and Maria Theresa Diño Velasquez. He has an older brother, Angel James Dee, who is also an actor, and two younger siblings, Isaiah Joseph and Angelika.

As early as Grade 4, Dee was offered a scholarship by then-Naga mayor Jesse Robredo. He later became a member of the Philippine national swimming team at age 13 and competed in the 2005 SEA Games in Manila, the 2006 Asian Games in Doha, Qatar, the 2007 SEA Games in Nakhon Ratchasima, Thailand, and the 2009 SEA Games in Vientiane, Laos.

Dee graduated from Naga Hope Christian School in 2005 and subsequently pursued higher education at De La Salle University in Manila, where he earned a degree in political science in 2009.

== Career ==
=== 2006–2008 ===
Dee made his first television appearance as a guest on the talk show Homeboy in 2006. He began landing acting roles shortly after, with Abt Ur Luv as his first show in 2006, in which he played Blue.

In 2007, he appeared in Sineserye Presents: Palimos Ng Pag-ibig as Job, Komiks Presents: Pedro Penduko at ang mga Engkantao as Mark, and Your Song Presents: Tulak ng Bibig as Marlon. He was also featured in several campaigns for brands such as Close Up, Bench, KFC, and Timex.

Dee starred in two shows with Kim Chiu and Gerald Anderson in 2008. First is the series My Girl, based on the South Korean drama of the same title, in which he played Nico Legaspi. And the second is Your Song: My Only Hope, as Jhune Crisostomo.

This was also the year when Enchong started appearing regularly on the Sunday variety show ASAP.

=== 2009 ===
Dee started to endorse Coca-Cola in 2009 when he appeared in a TV commercial with Kim Chiu and Shaina Magdayao. He became a prominent ambassador of the brand for many years.

In May 2009, the actor appeared in a supporting role in the series Komiks Presents: Nasaan Ka Maruja?, where he played Brian Lorenzo, Ross' brother.

Concurrently, Enchong starred in Your Song Presents: Boystown with other members of the Gigger Boys – Robi Domingo, AJ Perez, Sam Concepcion, Arron Villaflor, Dino Imperial, and Chris Gutierrez. The weekly series, set in a reform center for juvenile street children, featured Dee as Arnel, a skilled swimmer whose talent presents him with opportunities beyond the institution.

He also had a small role in the comedy film BFF: Best Friends Forever, starring Sharon Cuneta and Ai-Ai delas Alas, playing Paco.

Later that year, Dee gained wider recognition for his role in Katorse, a television adaptation of the 1968 film, in which he starred opposite Erich Gonzales and Ejay Falcon. The series marked a turning point in his acting career. He portrayed Jojo Wenceslao, one of the love interests of Nene, played by Gonzales.

Dee and Gonzales subsequently appeared together in the indie film Paano Ko Sasabihin?, a Cinema One Originals entry about two individuals who accidentally mistake each other for deaf-mutes. For this film, the duo was required to learn sign language.

=== 2010–2011 ===
The following year, he reunited with Erich and Ejay in the TV series Tanging Yaman. He portrayed Jomari Buenavista, the second son of the Vice President and one of Fina's love interests.

A month after the show concluded, Dee joined the cast of Magkaribal as Caloy Javier. The drama series was topbilled by Bea Alonzo and Gretchen Barretto, and is set in the fashion world, featuring costuming and cameo appearances by local designers.

In November 2010, Dee made a brief appearance in the series Your Song Presents: Andi, starring Andi Eigenmann.

That same year, he also appeared in two Star Cinema films: Sa 'yo Lamang, which earned him the Gawad PASADO award for Best Supporting Actor, and I Do, his first leading role in a major film, opposite Gonzales.

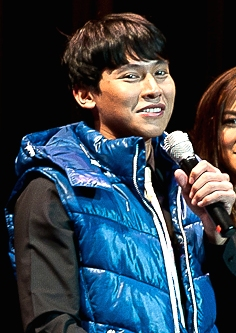
Dee in 2011

In 2011, he worked with Gonzales again in the Philippine remake of Maria La Del Barrio, portraying Luis de la Vega, the love interest of Maria. Endorsement-wise, he became an ambassador of Jollibee, a popular fast-food chain in the Philippines.

=== 2012–2013 ===
Dee appeared in The Reunion, a teen romantic comedy film released in 2012, alongside Enrique Gil, Xian Lim, and Kean Cipriano. The film follows four young men whose lives are altered after attending their high school reunion. He also starred in The Strangers, his first entry in the Metro Manila Film Festival, opposite Julia Montes and Enrique Gil. He played Dolfo, a mysterious young man whom the villagers suspect of malevolence.

From 2012 to 2013, he played Ethan, one of the main characters in the teleserye Ina, Kapatid, Anak with Kim Chiu, Maja Salvador, and Xian Lim. The series was among ABS-CBN's highest-rated shows in 2013.

In the same year, Dee starred in the blockbuster comedy-drama film Four Sisters and a Wedding as CJ Salazar. The four sisters – played by Bea Alonzo, Toni Gonzaga, Shaina Magdayao, and Angel Locsin – attempt to stop his wedding to Princess, portrayed by Angeline Quinto. He also appeared in two other comedy-drama films that year: Tuhog, with Eugene Domingo and Leo Martinez, and Call Center Girl, with Pokwang and Jessy Mendiola. All three films were produced by Star Cinema.

In July 2013, he worked with Julia and Enrique again in the television series Muling Buksan Ang Puso.

=== 2014–2016 ===
Dee reunited with Gonzales in the movie Once a Princess in 2014, which also starred JC de Vera. He played Leonard Jamieson, a geeky guy who later becomes a wealthy executive.

That year, Dee also released his self-titled debut album under Star Music. Its first single, "Chinito Problems", was a response to Yeng Constantino's 2013 hit song "Chinito". The dance track "Seloso" was released as the second single. Dee also released music videos for "Step No Step Yes", originally performed by VST & Co., and "Isip O Puso", a song he wrote inspired by his film Once a Princess.

In 2015, Dee briefly became a housemate in the reality show Pinoy Big Brother, and eventually as one of the hosts of the 737 edition. He also held his first major two-night concert, DEETOUR: The Chinito Live in Concert, at the Music Museum in Greenhills, where each night featured a different set of surprise guests.

The year after, Dee starred in the psychological horror film Lila, opposite Janine Gutierrez for the first time. He played Kevin, Jess' cousin, who tries to help Jess escape from her past. The movie was part of the 2016 Sinag Maynila Independent Film Festival.

Produced by Regal Entertainment, he also starred opposite Kiray Celis in the comedy film I Love You to Death. They portrayed Tonton and Gwen, childhood sweethearts who reunite after many years apart. Unbeknownst to Gwen, Tonton had already died and returned only to answer her desperate longing for love.

After his debut album reached platinum status, Dee released his second album, EDM (Enchong Dee Moves). It spawned the singles "Telenobela", "‘Di Ko Alam", and "Hanggang Dito Na Lang". He wrote one song, "Hopia", on the 10-track album, which was also released under Star Music.

Finally, Dee also joined the cast of Mano Po 7: Chinoy. He played Wilson Wong Jr., a drug and alcohol addict who is sent to a rehabilitation facility and falls in love with a fellow patient, Jocelyn, portrayed by Jessy Mendiola. The Mano Po film series is among the most successful in the Philippines and is produced by Regal Entertainment.

=== 2017–2019 ===
In 2017, Dee starred in the horror film Nay, with Sylvia Sanchez and Jameson Blake. He played Martin, a rich, sheltered youth who gets transformed into an aswang by his yaya, Nay Luisa. This film was an entry to the 2017 Cinema One Originals Film Festival. Dee also made a special appearance in Erich's MMFF movie, Siargao, later that year.

Enchong worked again with Erich and Ejay in the TV series The Blood Sisters in 2018, which to date is their last project together. He played the character Dr. Samuel Hechanova.

Reuniting with Janine Gutierrez, they both starred in the pre-Valentine's movie Elise in 2019, produced by Regal Films. He played Bert, who has feelings for Elise since they were kids.

=== 2020–2021 ===
During the COVID-19 pandemic, Dee appeared in the Netflix film Alter Me, opposite Jasmine Curtis-Smith. His character, Uno, works as an escort to make ends meet, yet longs for a more meaningful connection. The movie received mixed reviews, with one critic commenting that it "refuses to dig deeper into the subculture". He also appeared in the film Four Sisters Before the Wedding in 2020, which serves as both a prequel and sequel to the original hit movie.

Dee was also one of the hosts of Pinoy Big Brother: Connect edition from 2020 to 2021.

In 2021, he appeared in a supporting role in the television series Huwag Kang Mangamba, playing Father Sebastián Tantiangco.

=== 2022–2023 ===
Dee appeared in more supporting roles in 2022. First, in the fantasy drama television series Darna, as Elijah, who has telekinetic powers. And second, in the film Partners in Crime, starring Vice Ganda and Ivana Alawi, as Carlos Jose Salazar.

Before the turn of the year, Dee ended his affiliation with KP&PR&EMS, Inc., the company co-managing him with Star Magic. The company issued the following statement: "This is to make public the fact that Mr. Ernest Lorenzo V. Dee is no longer represented, directly or indirectly by KP&PR&EMS, Inc., with office at 8 Dapdap Road, Forbes Park, Makati City, effective as of 31 December 2022."

In 2023, Enchong and Mon Confiado starred in the movie The Fisher, a film about a Filipino fisherman, Pedro (played by Mon), who discovers a Chinese fisherman, Hai (portrayed by Dee), lost at sea. It marked the directorial comeback of Paul Soriano, who also wrote and produced the film. It was nominated at the 36th Tokyo International Film Festival, which the three of them attended.

In the same year, Dee was the lead role in two movies for the 2023 Metro Manila Film Festival. First is the comedy film Here Comes the Groom, opposite Maris Racal and Keempee de Leon. He played Rodrigo Jr., the conservative and shy groom.

The second is the critically acclaimed film GomBurZa, where he portrayed Padre Jacinto Zamora, one of the three martyr priests. Critics described the movie as "brilliant" and an "empowering tribute to Filipino martyrs". It became the most-awarded film at the 49th Metro Manila Film Festival, and also received two awards at the 72nd FAMAS Awards. Beyond the accolades, the movie ranked number one on Netflix Philippines upon its release on the platform, demonstrating both critical approval and strong popular appeal.

=== 2024–2025 ===
Dee was one of the hosts of Pinoy Big Brother: Gen 11 edition in 2024. He also appeared in the drama horror film Outside, where he played Corcuera, a wounded soldier among those fleeing a zombie outbreak in the city.

In 2025, Enchong came back as a host for both Pinoy Big Brother: Celebrity Collab Edition and Pinoy Big Brother: Celebrity Collab Edition 2.0. He also got the opportunity to become a TEDx speaker at Miriam College High School, where he discussed the role of education and self-determination in shaping a brighter future.

Later that year, he became part of the Philippine adaptation of the K-drama It's Okay Not To Be Okay, starring Anne Curtis, Joshua Garcia, and Carlo Aquino. The series was first released on Netflix on July 18, 2025, and on other platforms subsequently. Dee graced a digital magazine cover promoting the show, which was shot in Hong Kong and released in the same month as the series premiere.

On October 16, 2025, Dee's first international film, Ailleurs La Nuit (Elsewhere at Night), premiered at the 2025 Festival du nouveau cinéma. The movie was shot in both Quebec, Canada and the Philippines.

=== 2026 ===
Netflix Philippines announced in February that Enchong and Barbie Forteza will star in A Perfect Christmas, part of a four-episode anthology titled Paskong Pinoy. It will stream on Netflix starting December 3.

== Sports ==
=== Swimming ===
Dee is a champion swimmer and a former member of the Philippine National Swimming Team, having represented the country in international swimming competitions.

At 17 years old, he made his debut at the 2005 Southeast Asian Games (SEA Games) held in Manila, finishing in 6th place. Dee also competed at the 2006 Asian Games in Doha, Qatar, where he placed 2nd. In 2007, he returned to the SEA Games, reaching the men's 100-meter butterfly finals in Nakhon Ratchasima, Thailand. Dee competed once more at the 2009 SEA Games in Vientiane, Laos, which marked his final competition before retiring from competitive swimming.

He was a star swimmer of De La Salle University. Dee's ended La Salle's six-year title drought by winning 7 gold medals in the swimming division at the 72nd UAAP Swimming Championship.

Dee is part of Guinness World Records. He participated in giving the largest swimming lessons to 1,819 kids in Waterpark, Clark Pampanga in June 2019.

=== Marathon ===
In 2014, Dee led the Amway Fun Run at the SM Mall of Asia grounds. He also participated in the 42-kilometer race at the 2019 Osaka Marathon, finishing in 4 hours and 23 minutes.

=== Triathlon ===
Dee participated in the Ironman 70.3 Triathlon in Cebu in 2017 and 2018. He also competed in the Regent Aguila 70.3 Ironman Asia Pacific Championship in Cebu City in 2018.

== Other ventures ==
=== Business ===
Dee owns several branches of Peri-peri Charcoal Chicken, a Portuguese-styled charcoal chicken restaurant which located at SM Megamall, U.P Town Center, Marquee Mall and Market Market.

In 2020, he also invested in food production industry through a shrimp farm known as Palaya Shrimp Farm located in Palauig, Zambales. His farm features seven villas, landscaped areas with fruit bearing trees, ponds and circular tanks with shrimp and milkfish.

Dee, together with fellow actor Joshua Garcia as his business partner, opened a music school called Academy of Rock (AOR) Philippines in 2021. The school is dedicated to teaching rock and popular music, offering lessons in pop music theory, electric guitar, electric bass guitar, pop and rock vocals and drums.

== Filmography ==
=== Film ===
Year	Title	Role
2009	BFF (Best Friends Forever)	Paco
2009	Paano Ko Sasabihin?	Mike
2010	Sa 'Yo Lamang	James Alvero
2010	I Do	Lance Anderson Tan
2012	The Reunion	Lloyd
2012	The Strangers	Dolfo
2013	Four Sisters and a Wedding	Calvin John "CJ/Rebreb" Salazar
2013	Tuhog	Caloy Sicat
2013	Call Center Girl	Vince Sandoval
2013	Pagpag: Siyam na Buhay	Joseph Maurice
2014	Once a Princess	Leonard Jamieson
2016	Lila	Kevin
2016	I Love You to Death	Anthony "Tonton" M. Gatchalian
2016	Mano Po 7: Tsinoy	Wilson "Son" Wong Jr.
2017	Nay	Martin
2017	Siargao	Mikey
2019	Elise	Bert
2020	Alter Me	Uno
2020	Four Sisters Before the Wedding	Carlos Jose ”CJ/RebReb” Salazar
2022	Partners in Crime	Carlos Jose Salazar
2023	Here Comes the Groom	Rodrigo Jr.
2023	The Fisher	Hai
2023	GomBurZa	Padre Jacinto Zamora
2024	Outside	Soldier
2025	Elsewhere at Night (Ailleurs la nuit)	
TBA	The Sacrifice	Danny

=== Television ===
Year	Title	Role
2007	Sineserye Presents: Palimos ng Pag-Ibig	Job
2007	Komiks Presents: Pedro Penduko at ang mga Engkantao	Mark
2007	Your Song Presents: Tulak ng Bibig	Marlon
2007	Mars Ravelo's Lastikman	Rafael "Raffy" Gipit
2007	Star Magic Presents: Abt Ur Luv: Ur Lyf 2	Blue Mangubat
2008	Star Magic Presents: Astigs in Haay...Skul Lyf	Ipe
2008	Star Magic Presents: Astigs in Luvin' Lyf	Epi
2008	My Girl	Nico Legaspi
2008	Your Song Presents: My Only Hope	Juanito "Jhun" Dimaano Jr.
2008–present	ASAP	Main host / Performer
2009	Komiks Presents: Mars Ravelo's: Nasaan Ka Maruja?	Brian Lozano
2009	Your Song Presents: Boystown	Arnel Dela Cruz
2009	Tayong Dalawa	David Anthony Garcia
2009	Katorse	John Joseph "Jojo" Wenceslao
2010	Your Song Presents: Love Me, Love You	Water Boy
2010	Maalaala Mo Kaya: Kariton	Efren Peñaflorida
2010	Tanging Yaman	Jose Mari "Jomari" Buenavista
2010	Magkaribal	Caloy Javier
2010	Your Song Presents: Andi	Nico Mariveles
2010	Wansapanataym: Ali Badbad en da Madyik Banig	Ali Badbad
2010	Shout Out!	Himself/host
2010	Maalaala Mo Kaya: Parol	Toto
2011	Your Song Presents: Kim	Manny
2011	Mara Clara	Cameo Appearance
2011	Maria la del Barrio	Luis Fernando Dela Vega
2012–13	Ina, Kapatid, Anak	Ethan Castillo
2013	Muling Buksan ang Puso	Leonel Beltran
2014	Maalaala Mo Kaya: Orasan	Johnny
2014	Maalaala Mo Kaya: Alak	Paul
2014	Ipaglaban Mo: Paano Na Ang Pangarap?	Rolly
2015	Ipaglaban Mo: Sa Aking Pag-gising	Dino
2015	Wansapanataym: My Kung Fu Chinito	Diego Calasiao
2015	Pinoy Big Brother: 737	Houseguest/Host
2015	Nathaniel	Angel Eldon
2017	A Love to Last	Andrew Agoncillo
2017	Maalaala Mo Kaya: Rehab Center	Jeck
2018	The Blood Sisters	Samuel Hechanova
2019	Eat Bulaga!	Guests/Game Shows/BOOM
2019	Maalaala Mo Kaya: Wheelchair	Melvin
2020	Trip to Quiapo	Hulyong Manunulat
2021	Huwag Kang Mangamba	Sebastian "Seb" Tantiangco
2021	Maalaala Mo Kaya: Jacket	Edwin
2022–2023	Mars Ravelo's Darna	Elijah "Eli" Torres / Levitator
2025	It's Showtime	Guest / Performer
2025	Pinoy Big Brother: Celebrity Collab Edition	Host
2025	It’s Okay to Not Be Okay	Vincent Romulo
2025	Pinoy Big Brother: Celebrity Collab Edition 2.0	Host
2026	Your Face Sounds Familiar (season 4)	Guest with Yeng Constantino
2026	Paskong Pinoy: A Perfect Christmas	

=== Modeling ===
Year	Title	Role
2010	Bench Uncut: A Bold Look at the Future	Himself/model
2012	Bench Universe: 25th Anniversary Denim and Underwear Show	Himself/model
2014	Bench: The Naked Truth	Himself/model

=== Music video appearances ===
Year	Song	Artist	Director
2013	"Chinito"	Yeng Constantino	Avid Liongoren
2014	"Chinito Problems"	Enchong Dee	Jasper Salimbangon
2015	"Seloso"	Enchong Dee	Jemimah Dadula
2015	"Step No Step Yes"	Enchong Dee	
2015	"Isip O Puso"	Enchong Dee	

== Discography ==
=== Albums ===
Year	Album	Singles	Label
2014	"Enchong Dee"	Chinito Problems	Star Music
2014	"Enchong Dee"	Seloso	Star Music
2016	EDM (Enchong Dee Moves)	Telenobela	Star Music
2016	EDM (Enchong Dee Moves)	Di Ko Alam	Star Music

== Awards and nominations ==
Year	Film Award/Critics	Award	Result
2009	ASAP Pop Viewer's Choice Awards	Pop Male Fashionista	Nominated
2010	Gawad PASADO	Pinakapasadong Kabataan	Won
2010	41st Guillermo Mendoza Memorial Foundation Awards	Most Promising Love Team with Erich Gonzales	Won
2010	Star Awards for Movies	New Movie Actor for Paano Ko Sasabihin?	Nominated
2010	FAMAS Awards	German Moreno Youth Achievement Award	Won
2010	Star Magic Ball	Star Magic Ball's Most Romantic Couple with Erich Gonzales	Won
2010	ASAP Pop Viewer's Choice Awards	Pop Male Fashionista	Nominated
2010	ASAP Pop Viewer's Choice Awards	Pop Fans Club for Loveteam with Erich Gonzales	Nominated
2010	ASAP Pop Viewer's Choice Awards	Pop Loveteam with Erich Gonzales	Nominated
2011	Barkada Choice Awards	Choice Male Icon	Nominated
2011	Barkada Choice Awards	Choice Actor of the Year for Maalaala Mo Kaya: Parol	Won
2011	Barkada Choice Awards	Choice Breakthrough Artist of 2010	Won
2011	Gawad PASADO	Pasadong Katuwang Aktor for Sa'yo Lamang	Won
2011	Star Awards for Movies	Movie Supporting Actor of the Year for Sa'yo Lamang	Nominated
2011	ASAP Pop Viewer's Choice Awards	Pop Male Fashionista	Nominated
2011	ASAP Pop Viewer's Choice Awards	Pop Pin Up Boy	Won
2011	ASAP Pop Viewer's Choice Awards	Pop Fans Club for Loveteam with Erich Gonzales	Nominated
2011	Star Magic Ball	Star Magic Ball's Most Favorite Couple with Erich Gonzales	Won
2011	Golden Screen TV Awards	Outstanding Performance by an Actor in a Single Drama/Telemovie Program for Maalaala Mo Kaya: Parol	Nominated
2011	Star Awards for TV	Best Single Performance by an Actor for Maalaala Mo Kaya: Parol	Won
2012	Gawad TANGLAW	Best Performance by an Actor (Single Performance) for Maalaala Mo Kaya: Parol	Won
2012	43rd Guillermo Mendoza Memorial Foundation Awards	Best Loveteam for TV and Movies with Erich Gonzales	Won
2014	11th ENPRESS Golden Screen Awards	Best Performance by an Actor in a Leading Role (Musical or Comedy) for Four Sisters and a Wedding	Nominated
2014	28th PMPC Star Awards for TV	Best Drama Actor for Muling Buksan Ang Puso	Nominated
2015	MOR Pinoy Music Awards	Dance Hit of the Year (Chinito Problems)	Won
2015	7th PMPC Star Awards for Music	New Male Recording Artist of the Year	Nominated
2015	7th PMPC Star Awards for Music	Dance Album of the Year (Enchong Dee)	Nominated
2019	33rd PMPC Star Awards for Television	Best Single Performance by an Actor for Maalaala Mo Kaya: Wheelchair	Won
2020	7th Urduja Heritage Film Awards	Best Actor in Comedy or Musical for Elise	Won
