= Erich Gonzales =

Filipino actress (born 1990)

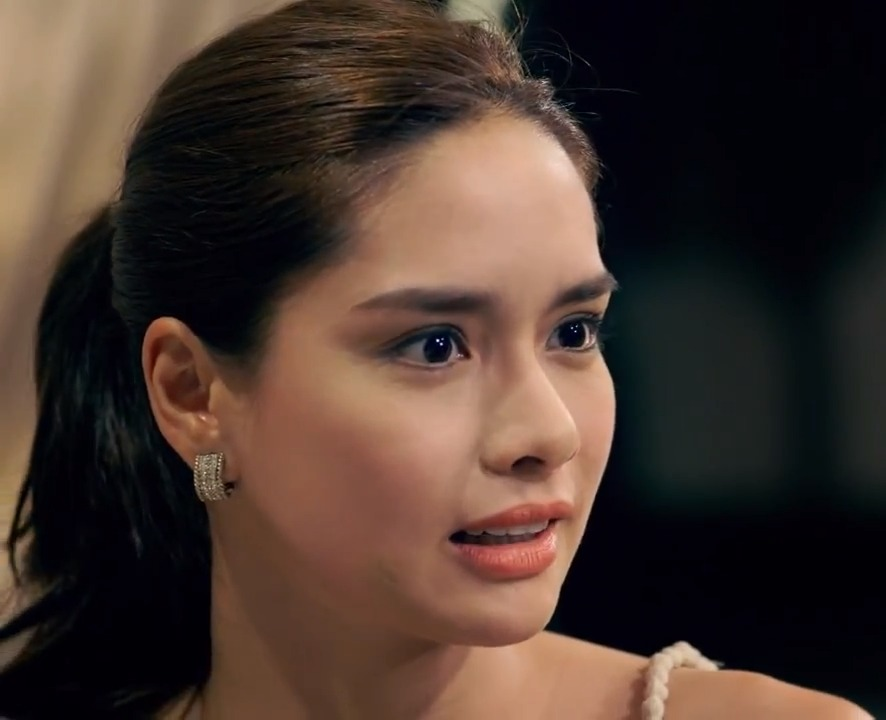
- Gonzales in 2014
- Born: Erika Chryselle Gonzales Gancayco; September 20, 1990 (age 36); Cebu City, Philippines
- Occupation: Actress
- Years active: 2004–2022 (hiatus)
- Agent: Star Magic (2004–present)
- Height: 1.63 m (5 ft 4 in)
- Spouse: Mateo Lorenzo (m. 2022)
- Children: 1

Erika Chryselle Gonzales Gancayco-Lorenzo (born September 20, 1990), better known by her stage name Erich Gonzales (English: /ˈɛrɪtʃ/; Tagalog: [ˈɛɾitʃ gɔnˈsalɛs]), is a Filipino actress. She is a contract artist of ABS-CBN's Star Magic. She started her showbiz career at the age of 14, as a contestant of the reality talent search Star Circle Quest. She came to prominence in her lead role Katorse.

After winning Star Circle Quest, she changed her last name from Gancayco to Gonzales, her mother's maiden name. Due to the start of her entertainment career, Erich completed her high school years at the ABS-CBN Distance Learning Center and attended college at the Trinity University of Asia, where she majored in mass communication.

== Early life ==
The youngest of three siblings, Gonzales was born in Cebu City and raised in Davao City.

== Career ==
=== 2004–2008: Star Circle Quest and supporting roles ===
Her career began when she won as Grand Questor in the second season of the reality talent search Star Circle Quest in 2005, and later becoming a part of ABS-CBN's home-based training and management program, Star Magic after her win. Erich became a familiar face as she appeared in numerous shows and dramas as a supporting actress, such as Dorina in the hit phenomenon TV series Mga Anghel na Walang Langit. She also starred in the teen-oriented show Abt Ur Luv as Waling-Waling and as Ella in the drama series Pieta. She then showed her versatility in acting when she played Camille in the drama series Sana Maulit Muli opposite to Gerald Anderson with Kim Chiu as the supporting cast and antagonist later in the end became kind throughout every episode.

=== 2009: Katorse ===
Gonzales rose to fame in 2009 when she played the protagonist, a teenage mother in the TV adaptation of the 1980 film Katorse, alongside Enchong Dee, Ejay Falcon, and Xian Lim. The series became a top rater and was critically acclaimed, catapulting Erich to stardom, earning her the title "Breakthrough Star of 2009" by the Sunday entertainment talk show, The Buzz.

In the same year, she made her film debut in her first digital movie (Indie film) Paano Ko Sasabihin? with her perennial partner, Enchong Dee. The film became an official entry to the 2009 Cinema One Originals Film Festival and was a recipient of several awards in the festival.

=== 2010–2011: Career expansion ===
In 2010, following the success of Katorse, she landed her second lead role in the TV series Tanging Yaman alongside her Katorse co-stars Enchong Dee and Ejay Falcon. The series was one of ABS-CBN's offerings for the 60th Celebration of Filipino Soap Operas. While the series was still airing, Erich had begun working for her third series project, Magkaribal. The show was highly acclaimed and is now regarded as Philippines' First Fashionserye (first fashion TV series).

After an impressive back-to-back hit TV series, Gonzales signed an exclusive two-year contract with Star Cinema, poising her to prove her box-office draw. Later that year, the hit love team of Erich and Enchong starred in their first mainstream movie, I Do under Star Cinema. She also became the lead cast of the indie film Noy with Coco Martin, which became the Philippines' entry in the 83rd Academy Awards in Best Foreign Language Film category.

In the same year, Gonzales was also given the opportunity to be one of the main hosts in the youth variety show, Shoutout!, which featured teen stars.

The Filipino adaptation of Maria la del Barrio was the highlight for Erich in 2011. The series became a Twitter trending royalty as it trended locally and worldwide on and off throughout its run. It was also extended twice as its ratings remained consistently high.

In December 2011, her indie film, Pinta*Kasi was finally screened in theaters as part of the 2011 Metro Manila Film Festival. The film won Best Picture in the New Wave Section and Best Actor (same category) for co-star, JM de Guzman. The said film was also invited to Beijing and Hawaiian film festivals for its "strength of word of mouth buzz and its hip hop elements."

In October 2011, she starred with Thai actor Mario Maurer in the film Suddenly It's Magic.

In March 2017, Gonzales was welcomed as the newest brand ambassador for MySlim, a popular slimming drink in the Philippines.

=== 2012–present: Successful movies and Juan dela Cruz ===
As Maria la del Barrio ended with a high note in March 2012, Erich's other indie movie was released. She starred in a horror movie alongside Derek Ramsay, titled Corazon: Ang Unang Aswang and opened to a very warm audience reception. Earning seven million pesos on its first day, the movie became the Highest Grossing Digital Film. As a result, Star Cinema crowned Erich with the title Philippine Box Office Queen for Digital Independent Film.

In May 2012, Gonzales began working on her biggest project of the year, Suddenly It's Magic, a film with Thai actor Mario Maurer under Star Cinema. With the collaboration of Filipino and Thai production teams, actors, and actresses, the film is the first Filipino-Thai movie created between the two countries. The official movie was released on October 31, 2012, in the Philippines, March 14, 2013, in Thailand, and March 28, 2013, in Cambodia.

The latter part of 2012 was a hectic one for Erich. She made her debut appearance in Canada as part of the TFC Liga Kapamilya Basketball Finals at the end of August. She wowed the crowds in Oshawa, Ontario and Burnaby, British Columbia. Then, on November 3, she entertained Kapamilyas in Los Angeles for the Star Magic 20 Tour. Erich capped her year with the release of her fourth indie film, Mariposa: Sa Hawla ng Gabi with director Richard V. Somes.

After having a successful love team with Enchong Dee and team-up with Mario Maurer, she appears once again in the weeknight primetime slot, as she becomes part of the biggest television series of ABS-CBN for 2013. Titled Juan dela Cruz, she is paired up once again with Noy co-star and Prince of Teleserye Coco Martin as his leading lady. The show immediately became number one in national TV ratings during its pilot episode and is expected to continue throughout its run.

In 2014, Gonzales and Enchong Dee had a reunion movie project with JC de Vera in Once a Princess directed by Laurice Guillen. She played her most challenging role to show her versatility as the second wife in the upcoming Primetime teleserye hit Koreanovela-remake series Two Wives, opposite to Jason Abalos, alongside Kaye Abad, Patrick Garcia and Rayver Cruz. After the movie Once a Princess, she rejoined JC de Vera in MMFF's Shake, Rattle & Roll XV: "Ahas", playing a twin-snake in a mall.

In 2015, Gonzales had a special role on the TV series, Forevermore as Alexandra "Alex" Pante.

In 2016, Gonzales starred in the daytime series Be My Lady opposite Daniel Matsunaga. In 2018, she led the cast of the TV series The Blood Sisters where she played three different characters, triplets in the show.

Gonzales returned to television in 2021 in the revenge drama TV series La Vida Lena.

== Personal life ==
Gonzales previously dated actor and Be My Lady co-star Daniel Matsunaga in 2015. The couple broke up after less than two years.

She married long-time boyfriend, businessman Mateo Lorenzo in March 2022.

== Filmography ==
=== Film ===
Year	Title	Role
2007	Paano Kita Iibigin	Guada
2008	Shake, Rattle & Roll X	Anna
2009	Love Me Again	Lovely
2009	Paano Ko Sasabihin?	Erhyl
2010	Noy	Divine
2010	I Do	Mayumi 'Yumi' Punongbayan
2011	Pintakasi	Josie
2012	Corazon: Ang Unang Aswang	Corazon
2012	Suddenly It's Magic	Josephine "Joey" Hermosa
2013	Mariposa: Sa Hawla ng Gabi	Maya
2014	Once a Princess	Erin Almeda
2014	Shake, Rattle & Roll XV	Sandra/Sarah
2017	Siargao	Laura
2018	The Significant Other	Nicole
2018	We Will Not Die Tonight	Kray

=== Television ===
Year	Title	Role	Notes	Source
2004	Star Circle National Teen Quest	Herself		
2004	Ok Fine 'To Ang Gusto Nyo	Erich		
2005	ASAP Fanatic	Herself/Performer		
2005	Mga Anghel na Walang Langit	Dorina Rodriguez		
2005	M.R.S.	Herself/hostess/Presenter		
2005–2006	Carlo J. Caparas' Ang Panday	Present Violeta Golda		
2006	Maalaala Mo Kaya	Con-con Hernandez	Episode: "Regalo"	
2006	Calla Lily	Diday Ramirez		
2007	Sana Maulit Muli	Camille Soriano	Supporting Role / Antagonist	
2007	Star Magic Presents: Abt Ur Luv, Lyf 2	Malory "Waling-Waling" Aguilar		
2007	Maalaala Mo Kaya	Suzette	Episode: "Feeding Bottle"	
2007	Super Inggo 1.5: Ang Bagong Bangis	Maeboo / Mariang Buhay		
2007	Komiks Presents: Pedro Penduko at ang mga Engkantao	Marlene		
2008	Your Song	Mia	Episode: "Bakit Labis Kitang Minahal"	
2008	Your Song	Elizabeth	Episode: "Muntik Na Kitang Minahal"	
2008	Kung Fu Kids	Nicole "Nick" Magalang		
2008	Maalaala Mo Kaya	Nelyia	Episode: "Flowers"	
2008	Ligaw na Bulaklak	Fatima		
2008–2009	Carlo J. Caparas' Pieta	Ella Torres		
2009–2018	ASAP	Herself/hostess/Performer		
2009	Maynila	Sara	Episode: "Sweet Melody"; First GMA Network appearance	
2009	Midnight DJ	Chicklet	Season 3 First TV5 appearance	
2009	Maalaala Mo Kaya	May Anne	Episode: "Pansit"	
2009	Agimat: Ang Mga Alamat ni Ramon Revilla Presents: Tiagong Akyat	Cornelia Verde		
2009–2010	Katorse	Elena "Nene" Reyes	Lead Role / Protagonist	
2010	Your Song	Nurse	Episode: "Love Me, Love You"	
2010	Tanging Yaman	Josefina "Fina" Policarpio	Lead Role / Protagonist	
2010	Maalaala Mo Kaya	Vangie	Episode: "Gitara"	
2010	Magkaribal	Chloe Abella	Main Role	
2010	Wansapanataym	Venus	Episode: "Bandanang Itim"	
2010	Shoutout!	Herself/hostess		
2011	Minsan Lang Kita Iibigin	Young Lora Sebastiano	Special Participation	
2011	Maalaala Mo Kaya	Grace	Episode: "Toga"	
2011–2015	Kris TV	Herself/co-hostess		
2011–2012	Maria la del Barrio	Maria Hernandez	Lead Role / Protagonist	
2012	Maalaala Mo Kaya	Merlie	Episode: "Apoy"	
2012	TodaMax	Herself		
2012	Wansapanataym	Jingle Cristobal	Episode: "Jingle's Bell"	
2013	Maalaala Mo Kaya	Grace Poe-Llamanzares	Episode: "Sanggol"	
2013	Juan dela Cruz	Rosario Galang-Dela Cruz Rosario Guerrero	Lead Role / Protagonist	
2014	Maalaala Mo Kaya	Jessica Espiritu	Episode: "Baston"	
2014–2015	Two Wives	Janine Arguello-Guevarra / Janine Arguello-Celdran	Main Role / Antagonist	
2015	Forevermore	Alexandra "Alex" Pante	Finale Special Participation	
2015	Ipaglaban Mo!	Christine	Episode: "Nakaw na Sandali"	
2016	Be My Lady	Filipina "Pinang" Crisostomo-Oliviera	Lead Role / Protagonist	
2017	Ipaglaban Mo!	PO3 Pia Capili	Episode: "Espiya"	
2017	Maalaala Mo Kaya	Mae	Episode: "Singsing"	
2017	Maalaala Mo Kaya	Vin-zel	Episode: "Stroller Bag"	
2018	FPJ's Ang Probinsyano	Princess Eliza		
2018	The Blood Sisters	Erika Castillo / Erika Bermudez Almeda/ Almira / Erika Magtibay Almeda; Dra. Carrie Ann Bermudez Almeda / Agnes / Carrie Ann Almeda-Alipio; Agatha Magtibay Almeda / Agatha Bermudez Almeda	Lead Triple Role	
2020–2022	La Vida Lena	Magdalena "Magda / Lena" Narciso-Cabrera	Lead Role / Main Villainous Protagonist	

== Awards and nominations ==
Year	Film Awards/Critics	Award	Work	Result
2003	Mutya ng Davao Pageant	Mutya ng Davao		Nominated
2005	Star Circle Quest	Grand Teen Questor		Won
2009	ABS-CBN	Breakthrough Star of 2009		Won
2010
2010	ABS-CBN	Best Bet		Won
2010	FAMAS Awards	German Moreno Youth Achievement Award		Won
2010	42nd Guillermo Mendoza Memorial Foundation Awards	Most Promising Love Team with Enchong Dee		Won
2010	ASAP Pop Viewer's Choice Awards	Pop Fans Club for Loveteam with Enchong Dee		Nominated
2010	ASAP Pop Viewer's Choice Awards	Pop Loveteam with Enchong Dee		Nominated
2010	Star Magic Ball	Star Magic Ball's Most Romantic Couple with Enchong Dee		Won
2010	US Girls' August Awards 2010	Face of the Year (Teens)		Won
2010	FHM Magazine	12th of Philippines' 100 Sexiest Women In The World		Won
2010	41st Box Office Entertainment Awards	Promising Love Team of the Year with Enchong Dee	I Do, Tanging Yaman	Won
2011
2011	1st Barkada Choice Awards	Female Icon of the Year		Nominated
2011	Yes! Magazine	100 Most Beautiful Stars of 2011		Won
2011	FHM Magazine	38th of Philippines' 100 Sexiest Women In The World		Won
2011	ASAP Pop Viewer's Choice Awards	Pop Fans Club for Loveteam with Enchong Dee		Nominated
2011	Star Magic Ball	Star Magic Ball's Most Favorite Couple with Enchong Dee		Won
2011	Metro Manila Film Festival	Best New Wave Actress - Pintakasi		Nominated
2012
2012	Yahoo! Philippines OMG! Awards 2012	Breakthrough Actress of the Year		Nominated
2012	43rd Guillermo Mendoza Memorial Foundation Awards	Best Loveteam for TV and Movies with Enchong Dee		Won
2012	43rd Guillermo Mendoza Memorial Foundation Awards	Female Star of the Night		Won
2012	Star Cinema	Philippine Box Office Queen for Digital Independent Film - Corazon Ang Unang Aswang		Won
2012	Yes! Magazine	100 Most Beautiful Stars of 2012		Won
2012	FHM Magazine	40th of Philippines' 100 Sexiest Women In The World		Won
2012	Cinema One Originals	Best Actress - Mariposa sa Hawla ng Gabi		Nominated
2013	FHM Magazine	34th of Philippines' 100 Sexiest Women In The World		Won
2013	Far East Film Festival- Udine, Italy	Actress	Mariposa: Sa Hawla ng Gabi	Included
2013	17th Puchon International Fantastic Film Festival- Bucheon, Korea	Actress	Mariposa: Sa Hawla ng Gabi	Included
2014	Yes! Magazine	Most Beautiful Star of 2014		Won
2014	40th Metro Manila Film Festival	Best Actress	Shake, Rattle & Roll XV: Ahas	Nominated
2016	FHM Magazine	46th of Philippines' 100 Sexiest Women In The World		Won
2017	FHM Magazine	38th of Philippines' 100 Sexiest Women In The World		Won
2017	43rd Metro Manila Film Festival	Female Star of the Night	—N/a	Won
2017	43rd Metro Manila Film Festival	Best Actress	Siargao	Nominated
2018	ABS-CBN Ball 2018	Metro's Best Dressed Female		Won
2018	Film Academy of the Philippines	Best Actress	Siargao	Nominated
2018	Luna Awards	Best Actress	Siargao	Nominated
2018	Film Academy of the Philippines	Best Actress	Siargao	Nominated
2018	PMPC Star Awards for Television	Best Actress	The Blood Sisters	Nominated
2018	RAWR Awards	Actress of the Year	The Blood Sisters	Nominated
2018	RAWR Awards	Favorite Bida	The Blood Sisters	Nominated
2018	8th Eduk Circle Awards	Best TV Actress	The Blood Sisters	Nominated
2018	2018 PUSH Awards	Female TV Performance of the Year	The Blood Sisters	Nominated
2018	17th New York Asian Film Festival	Actress/Producer	We Will Not Die Tonight	Included
