= Angelika Dela Cruz =

Filipino actress (born 1981)

- Born: Maria Lourdes Egger dela Cruz; October 29, 1981 (age 45); Quezon City, Philippines
- Other name: Shine
- Occupations: Actress; singer
- Years active: 1995–present
- Spouse: Orion Casareo (m. 2008)
- Children: 2
- Relatives: Mika dela Cruz (sister); Edward dela Cruz (brother); Nash Aguas (brother-in-law)
- Musical career
- Genres: Pop; OPM; R&B
- Labels: BMG Records Pilipinas (1996–1999); Imperial Records; Star Records; Star Magic (1995–1999; 2003–2007)

Barangay Chairman of Longos (Malabon)
- In office 2013–present
- Preceded by: Ernie Dela Cruz

Personal details
- Party: NPC

Maria Lourdes "Angelika" Egger Dela Cruz-Casareo (born October 29, 1981), is a Filipino actress and politician. She started her showbiz career in 1995, and has since appeared in television shows and movies. Originally with ABS-CBN from 1995 to 1999 and again from 2003 to 2007, she became a contract artist under GMA Network in 1999 until 2003, and again since 2007. She is currently serving as the barangay captain of Longos, Malabon, Metro Manila since 2013.

Dela Cruz's acting career was started with ABS-CBN in 1996 in the primetime drama Mara Clara and Esperanza in 1997 until 1999, both starring Judy Ann Santos. She later left the network and transferred to GMA Network to do other primetime dramas such as Ikaw Lang ang Mamahalin from 2001 until 2002, Habang Kapiling Ka as a lead actress in late 2002, Sana'y Wala Nang Wakas from 2003 to 2004, and then 2005 the award-winning ensemble cast of Ikaw ang Lahat sa Akin in 2006. She became a lead antagonist in the revival of Bituing Walang Ningning opposite Sarah Geronimo, which saw her potential as an antagonist as she did her last soap with the network in Prinsesa ng Banyera. She was given more primetime and afternoon dramas on GMA Network.

== Personal life ==
Angelika Dela Cruz was born to a Filipino father Ernie Dela Cruz (now deceased) and an Italian-Austrian mother Angelica Egger. She has a younger half-sister, Mika Dela Cruz, who is also an actress, and two brothers, Erick and Edward. Edward was one of the lead singers of the boy band "Freshmen", and died in a vehicular accident on June 7, 2010.

In an episode of Showbiz Central, de la Cruz revealed that she had married Orion Casareo in August 2008 and was expecting a child. She gave birth to Gabriel Casareo on March 22, 2009, via caesarian section. In 2015, she gave birth to her second son.

== Acting career ==
=== Early success ===
Angelika dela Cruz started acting at the age of seven when she appeared in the 1988 film Nagbabagang Luha. She was credited as Sunshine dela Cruz.

She gained notice when she won Best New Actress of the year award at the PMPC Star Awards for Movies for her very first movie Nights of Serafina. ABS-CBN saw her potential as an actress and she plays her role as Joyce in the second book of Mara Clara with Judy Ann Santos and Gladys Reyes.

She was also cast in other youth-oriented movies such as Istokwa with Mark Anthony Fernandez and was launched as the lead star in Huwag Mo Nang Itanong and Seventeen... So Kaka. She received critical acclaim in the movie Manananggal ng Manila which she starred alongside Alma Concepcion, Tonton Gutierrez, Eric Fructuoso and Aiza Seguerra. She was once again able to work with Judy Ann Santos in the primetime drama series Esperanza which made her a household name. In the series, she was first paired with Spencer Reyes however, the production staff later on paired her to actor Jericho Rosales. Her team-up with Rosales made its way to the big screen via Magandang Hatinggabi a horror movie produced by Star Cinema and other television projects such as the teen-oriented horror series !Oka Tokat, Star Drama Theater anthology, Maalaala Mo Kaya and F.L.A.M.E.S. They also became regulars in ASAP and Magandang Tanghali Bayan.

=== Breakthrough ===
After working with ABS-CBN, dela Cruz tried her luck in ABS-CBN's rival GMA Network. The network cast her in shows including primetime mini-series Di Ba't Ikaw, noontime variety show SOP and action-fantasy series Pintados. She was able to showcase her acting ability by playing the lead role in the mini-series Liwanag ng Hatinggabi with award-winning actress Lorna Tolentino and in Umulan Man o Umaraw. Her breakout role came when she was cast as the lead star of the primetime television series Ikaw Lang ang Mamahalin. The show became a huge success and crowned her as the Soap Opera Princess of GMA. She also appeared in the teen-oriented show Click but due to her rising popularity, she was pulled out from the show.

After the success of Ikaw Lang ang Mamahalin, she once again headlined another primetime drama entitled Habang Kapiling Ka opposite Victor Neri who played Erica Malvarosa. Her outstanding performance in the series gave her a Best Actress nomination at the 2003 PMPC Star Awards for TV. Dela Cruz also took part and matured in movies. In 2000, she earned a Best Supporting Actress nomination for the movie Deathrow, an official entry to the Metro Manila Film Festival. She also played the lead in the action-drama movie Hari Ng Selda alongside Robin Padilla and the comedy film S2pid Luv with rapper Andrew E. Both were under Viva Films.

After her contract with GMA expired in 2003, dela Cruz moved back to ABS-CBN and teamed-up with her former on-and-off screen partner Jericho Rosales in the TV series Sana'y Wala Nang Wakas with Diether Ocampo and Kristine Hermosa. The series became one of the most watched shows in primetime and its popularity has reached abroad. dela Cruz who played an optimistic and talented young lady who became romantically involved with the character played by Jericho Rosales was applauded by both viewers and critics. After the success of Sana'y Wala Nang Wakas, dela Cruz was cast in another primetime television drama called Ikaw Ang Lahat Sa Akin where she shared the screen with Star Magic's brightest talents such as Claudine Barretto, John Lloyd Cruz, Shaina Magdayao and Bea Alonzo. She also appeared as one of the main hosts of the showbiz-oriented talk show Entertainment Konek and Sunday variety show ASAP.

=== Villain with Present roles ===
Her career took a different direction in 2006 when she played an anti-heroine role to Sarah Geronimo in the drama series Bituing Walang Ningning, a TV adaptation of a 1980s movie starring Cherie Gil and Sharon Cuneta. Her superb performance as Lavinia Arguelles won her a Best Actress nomination at the 2007 PMPC Star Awards for Television and a Best Actress award in Gawad Amerika. She later appeared as Kristine Hermosa's ambitious twin sister in the afternoon drama Prinsesa ng Banyera.

In 2008, dela Cruz signed up with GMA Network and made a comeback via primetime drama series Babangon Ako't Dudurugin Kita where she played the villain role of Via Fausto. The series gave her the opportunity to work again with her previous co-stars such as Marvin Agustin, Tonton Gutierrez and Dina Bonnevie. Later that year, she was given a role in the afternoon drama series Una Kang Naging Akin, again she is the main antagonist which became a consistent top rater in the ratings game. In October of the year, she was cast as the scheming ex-girlfriend of JC de Vera in the primetime series LaLola.

After giving birth, dela Cruz returned to the screen by playing Iza Calzado's good-hearted sister in the afternoon drama series Kaya Kong Abutin ang Langit. She most recently appeared in the primetime fantasy comedy series Pilyang Kerubin, telefantasya Dwarfina and the sports series Futbolilits. She made a guest appearance on the pilot episode of Ruben Marcelino's Kokak before being cast as one of the leads in the primetime drama series Biritera in which she received positive reviews. After playing a good character in Biritera, she went back to playing villainous roles in the afternoon drama series Kasalanan Bang Ibigin Ka? and in the primetime fantasy series Aso ni San Roque. In 2013, Angelika once again plays the good character as Rodora Santos / Giselle Atienza-Carbonel in Mundo Mo'y Akin followed by Kambal Sirena (2014) and Second Chances (2015) then later she played Nimfa as the villainous mother of her stepson Jay (Kristofer Martin) in Healing Hearts along with Chloe (Krystal Reyes). In 2016, Dela Cruz played Evelyn as Larry's lovable wife and Ana's protagonist mother in Hanggang Makita Kang Muli.

In June 2017, she joined the cast in GMA's hit drama series Ika-6 na Utos as she played the new character, Geneva Ferrer-Takanashi, an older sister of Georgia (played by Ryza Cenon). In that series, she was first seen as a villain but later became good/hero.

In February 2019, she played the role of Lucy Lopez in Inagaw na Bituin as the main antagonist and mother to the anti-heroine, Ariella Lopez who was played by Therese Malvar. She also makes her sister and niece's life miserable in that series.

In January 2022, she comes back to GMA's hit drama series Little Princess as she played the role of Elise Reyes, a loving mother to the main protagonist, Princess Reyes-Montivano who was played by Jo Berry, and the Marcus's (played by Jestoni Alarcon) ex-lover or mistress.

== Singing career ==
Despite an active career in acting, Angelika made her first mark in showbiz through her musical talent for singing. In 1994, at the age of 13 she sang the theme song for the Tagalog dub of Sailor Moon which begin airing in October 1994 on ABC-5. The song was a variation of "Moonlight Densetsu" and the Tagalog lyrics were written by Vehnee Saturno.

In 1996, she released a 10-track self-titled album under BMG Records followed by a second album entitled My Only Wish three years later. The Japanese label Imperial Records tapped the singer-actress to record a few songs, which eventually gained international fame and earned for her a budding name in Japan. To give way to her flourishing acting career, Angelika's singing streak took a hiatus for years, until she later managed to sing once again in 2006 when she was included in the soundtrack the television series on which she starred, Bituing Walang Ningning. She recorded two songs for the series: Miss Na Miss Kita and Dito Ba? featuring Sarah Geronimo.

=== Lawsuit Against BMG Music ===
On March 17, 1995, de la Cruz (Lourdes Egger dela Cruz in real life) signed a contract with BMG under which she was required to record at least two albums over three years. But Dela Cruz only recorded one album during the period so BMG exercised on March 23, 1998, its option to extend the contract for two more years. She was required to record one album, which she was able to do. Despite the expiration of the option period, on May 8, 2000, BMG informed her she still had to record one album under the option period. On June 5, 2001, Dela Cruz sued and asked for damages, claiming that after recording one album BMG never gave her any proposal for a second one and that despite the lapse of the option period, the firm refused to release her on the ground that she still had to record one album.

The RTC found merit in Dela Cruz's petition, awarding her payment for damages, and the payment of royalties for the unfulfilled number of required songs under the agreement but BMG appealed the case and CA ruled in Dela Cruz' favor. However, CA deleted the lower court's award to Dela Cruz of ₱1.5 million in actual damages, ₱200,000 in moral damages, another ₱200,000 in exemplary damages, and ₱50,000 in attorneys' fees. The CA said there was no evidence to support the award of actual, moral and exemplary damages. And since both parties have legitimate claims to each other, CA said the award of attorney's fees was not warranted.

== Political career ==
In October 2014, Dela Cruz was elected barangay captain of Barangay Longos, Malabon. In October 2024, she filed her candidacy to run for vice mayor of Malabon in 2025 under Nationalist People's Coalition as the running mate of Malabon Representative Josephine Lacson-Noel, who is running for mayor.

In April 2025, Dela Cruz was charged before the Office of the Ombudsman with plunder involving at least P70 million in public funds of the barangay, as well as administrative offenses for neglecting her duties as barangay captain, frequent absences without official leave, and the unauthorized transfer of her official duties to her brother Erick. She denied the charges, citing slander from dirty politics.

On May 12, 2025, Dela Cruz lost election as vice mayor of Malabon against Edward Nolasco.

== Filmography ==
=== Film ===
Year	Title	Role
1988	Nagbabagang Luha	Dimples
1996	Nights of Serafina	Diana
1996	Istokwa	Lea
1997	Mananggal ng Maynila	Terry
1997	Huwag Mo Nang Itanong	Cely
1997	Ipaglaban Mo II	Agnes
1998	Magandang Hatinggabi	Marianne
1999	Seventeen so kaka	Neneng
1999	Esperanza: The Movie	Cecille / Regina
2000	Deathrow	Isabel
2002	Hari ng Selda: Anak ni Baby Ama 2	Angelica
2002	S2pid Luv	Wendy
2011	Babang Luksa	Idang
2012	An Angel's Tale	Angelika
2017	Trip Ubusan: The Lolas vs. Zombies	Madamme Eva

=== Television ===
Year	Title	Role
1996–1997	Mara Clara	Joyce
1997–1999	Esperanza	Cecille Montejo / Regina Salgado
1997–1999	!Oka Tokat	Tessa Sytangco
1997	Star Drama Theater Presents: Angelika	various roles
1998	Wansapanataym: "Musika ni Marissa"	Marissa
1999	Di Ba't Ikaw	Eloisa
1999	SOP	Host
1999	Pintados	Diwata / Reewa Zulueta
1999	Liwanag ng Hatinggabi	Luna
2000	Click	Olivia "Ollie" San Gabriel
2000	Umulan Man o Umaraw	Andrea
2001–2002	Ikaw Lang ang Mamahalin	Mylene Fuentebella / Katherine Morales / Carmencita San Diego
2002–2003	Habang Kapiling Ka	Erica Malvarosa
2003	ASAP	Host
2003	Sana'y Wala Nang Wakas	Mary Ann Santos
2004	EK Channel	Host
2004	Maalaala Mo Kaya: "Santo Niño de Cebu"	Sheryn Regis
2004	MTB Ang Saya Saya	Host
2005	Entertainment Konek	Host
2005	Ikaw ang Lahat sa Akin	Karri Medrano-Ynares
2006	Bituing Walang Ningning	Lavinia Arguelles
2007	Komiks: Pedro Penduko at ang mga Engkantao	Kalagua / Dr. Eva Tabinas
2007	Little Big Superstar	Star Judge
2007	Prinsesa ng Banyera	Mayumi Burgos / Daphne Pertierra
2008	Babangon Ako't Dudurugin Kita	Via Fausto
2008	Sine Novela: Una Kang Naging Akin	Vanessa Yumul
2008–2009	LaLola	Sabrina Starr
2009–2010	Sine Novela: Kaya Kong Abutin ang Langit	Nancy Rosales
2010	Carlo J. Caparas' Panday Kids	Ester / Ether
2010	Pilyang Kerubin	Melissa Alejandrino-Santos
2011	Dwarfina	Romera
2011	Futbolilits	Belinda Almodovar
2011	Spooky Nights: Kadugo	Ethel
2011	Ruben Marcelino's Kokak	Victoria "Vicky" Asuncion
2012	Biritera	Remedios "Remy" Capitollo
2012	Kasalanan Bang Ibigin Ka?	Leslie Montelibano
2012–2013	Aso ni San Roque	Bulan
2013	Mundo Mo'y Akin	Rodora Santos / Giselle Atienza-Carbonel
2014	Kambal Sirena	Reyna Arowana
2015	Healing Hearts	Nimfa Fernandez-Villamor
2016	Hanggang Makita Kang Muli	Evelyn Esguerra-Medrano
2017–2018	Ika-6 na Utos	Geneva Ferrer-Takahashi / Gen Santiago
2017	Dear Uge: K-drama Rama	Ate
2018–2019	Daddy's Gurl	Oprah Saavedra
2019	Inagaw na Bituin	Lucinda "Lucy" Lopez
2019	Beautiful Justice	Atty. Katrina Vijandre
2022	Little Princess	Elise Reyes-Montivano

== Discography ==
Year	Title	Track listing
1996 BMG	Angelika	Fill the World with love; Hindi lamang sa Pangarap; Sa Atin Lang; Kung Bubuksan Mo Man ang Puso Ko; Now you Go; Sasabihin Ko Na Ba?; Ready to Fall in Love Again; Tanging Puso Lang; Di Ko Alam; Pagkatapos ng Gabi
1998 BMG	My Only Wish	I Miss You; Paano ba?; Nadevelop; Hold Me in your Arms; Sana ay Magbalik Ka; Let the Love Begin; Don't throw it Away; In the Heat of Summer; My Only Wish; Ipangako Mo
1999 Imperial Records	In My Dreams	Unknown Tracks
2001	Metropop Song Festival	A Day and A Night More
2006 Star Records	Bituing Walang Ningning Soundtrack	Miss Na Miss Kita; Dito ba? (feat. Sarah Geronimo)

== Awards and nominations ==
=== Film ===
Year	Organization	Award	Movie	Remarks
2000	Metro Manila Film Festival	Best Supporting Actress	"Deathrow" (2000) !	Nominated
2000	49TH FAMAS Annual Awards	German Moreno Youth Achievement Awardee	German Moreno Youth Achievement Award	Won
1999	Metro Manila Film Festival	Best Supporting Actress	"Esperanza: The Movie" (1999)	Nominated
1997	PMPC Star Awards for Movies	Best New Actress of the Year	"Nights of Serafina" (1996)	Won

=== Television ===
Year	Organization	TV Award	TV show	Remarks
2017	7th EdukCircle Awards	Best Supporting Actress	"Ika-6 na Utos" (2017)	Nominated
2014	Golden Screen TV Awards	Outstanding Supporting Actress in a Drama Program	"Mundo Mo'y Akin" (2013)	Nominated
2007	21st PMPC Star Awards for Television	Best Drama Actress	"Bituing Walang Ningning" (2006)	Nominated
2007	Gawad America	Best Actress	"Bituing Walang Ningning" (2006)	Won
2006	ASAP Pop Awards	Best Character Actress	"Bituing Walang Ningning" (2006)	Nominated
2005	Shall We Dance: The Celebrity Dance Challenge	Grand Champion	Shall We Dance: The Celebrity Dance Challenge (2005)	Won
2003	PMPC Star Awards for Television	Best Drama Actress	"Habang Kapiling Ka" (2002)	Nominated
1998	PMPC Star Awards for Television	Best Single Performance by an Actress	GMA Telesine "Propeta" (1997)	Nominated
1997	PMPC Star Awards for Television	Best Single Performance by an Actress	Maalaala Mo Kaya episode "Jeepney" (1996)	Nominated

=== Music ===
Year	Organization	Music Award	Recipient	Remarks
2006	PARI	Gold Record Award	Bituing Walang Ningning:Soundtracks	Won
2001	Metropop 2001	Song Interpreter of the year	"A Day and a Night More"	Nominated
2001	Gintong Parangal ng Malabon	Gintong Parangal Awardee	herself	Won
1998	Parangal ng Bayan	People's Choice Awardee for Most Promising Female Performer	herself	Won
1997	Parangal ng Bayan	People's Choice Awardee for Most Promising Female Performer	herself	Won
1993	Likhawit	4th placer, Amateur Division	herself	Won
