= 29th PMPC Star Awards for Movies =

2012 Philippine Movie Press Club awards

29th Star Awards for Movies
- Date: March 10, 2013
- Site: AFP Theater, Camp Aguinaldo, Quezon City
- Hosted by: Iza Calzado; Piolo Pascual; Kim Chiu

Highlights
- Best Picture: El Presidente; Alagwa (Indie)

Television coverage
- Network: ABS-CBN

The 29th PMPC Star Awards for Movies by the Philippine Movie Press Club (PMPC), honored the best Filipino films of 2012. The ceremony took place on March 10, 2013 in AFP Theater, Camp Aguinaldo Quezon City. The award ceremony was aired on March 17, 2013 in Sunday Best on ABS-CBN.

The PMPC Star Awards for Movies was hosted by Piolo Pascual, Iza Calzado and Kim Chiu. El Presidente won the top awards of the night including Movie of the Year, Movie Director of the Year and Movie Actor of the Year, while Alagwa won the Indie Movie of the Year and Indie Movie Director of the Year.

== Winners and nominees ==
The following are the nominations for the 29th PMPC Star Awards for Movies, covering films released in 2012.

Winners are listed first and indicated in bold.

=== Major categories ===
| Movie of the Year | Indie Movie of the Year |
|---|---|
| Winner: **El Presidente** (Scenema Concept International, Inc.): A Mother's Story (Star Cinema and The Filipino Channel); I Do Bidoo Bidoo (Unitel and Studio 5); One More Try (Star Cinema); The Healing (Star Cinema); The Mistress (Star Cinema); Tiktik: The Aswang Chronicles (Reality Entertainment, Agostodos Pictures, Mothership, Postmanila, and GMA Films) | Winner: **Alagwa** (Breakaway Films): Amorosa, The Revenge (Skylight Films); Bwakaw (Octobertrain Films, APT Entertainment, and Cinemalaya); Graceland (Imprint Pictures and Digitank Studios); Mater Dolorosa (Creative Programs, Inc.); Mga Mumunting Lihim (LargaVista Entertainment, and Cinemalaya); Thy Womb (Centerstage Productions) |
| Movie Director of the Year | Indie Movie Director of the Year |
| Winner: **Mark Meily** - **(El Presidente)**: Ruel Bayani - (One More Try); Olivia Lamasan - (The Mistress); John-D Lazatin - (A Mother's Story); Chris Martinez - (I Do Bidoo Bidoo); Erik Matti - (Tiktik: The Aswang Chronicles); Chito Roño - (The Healing) | Winner: **Ian Loreños** - **(Alagwa)**: Adolfo Alix, Jr. (Mater Dolorosa); Jun Robles Lana (Bwakaw); Topel Lee (Amorosa, The Revenge); Brillante Mendoza (Thy Womb); Ron Morales (Graceland); Jose Javier Reyes (Mga Mumunting Lihim) |
| Movie Actor of the Year | Movie Actress of the Year |
| Winner:**Jeorge "E.R." Estregan** - **(El Presidente)**: John Lloyd Cruz (The Mistress); Dingdong Dantes (One More Try); Eddie Garcia (Bwakaw); Coco Martin (Sta. Niña); Aga Muhlach (Of All The Things); Jericho Rosales (Alagwa) | Winner: **Angel Locsin** - **(One More Try)**: Gina Alajar (Mater Dolorosa); Bea Alonzo (The Mistress); Nora Aunor (Thy Womb); Angelica Panganiban (One More Try); Vilma Santos (The Healing); Jodi Sta. Maria (Migrante) |
| Movie Supporting Actor of the Year | Movie Supporting Actress of the Year |
| Winner: **Carlo Aquino** - **(Mater Dolorosa)**: Neil Coleta (I Do Bidoo Bidoo); Joross Gamboa (Intoy Syokoy ng Kalye Marino); Baron Geisler (El Presidente); Zanjoe Marudo (One More Try); Cesar Montano (El Presidente); Ronaldo Valdez (The Mistress) | Winner: **Janice de Belen** - **(Tiktik: The Aswang Chronicles)**: Kim Chiu (The Healing); Alessandra de Rossi (Mater Dolorosa); Mylene Dizon (Sosy Problems); Jaclyn Jose (A Secret Affair); Hilda Koronel (The Mistress); Anita Linda (Sta. Niña) |
| New Movie Actor of the Year | New Movie Actress of the Year |
| Winner:**Neil Coleta (I Doo Bidoo Bidoo)**: RK Bagatsing (Slumber Party); Jerico Estregan (El Presidente); Diego Montano (Hitman); Daniel Padilla (24/7); Marti San Juan (The Grave Bandits); Markki Stroem (Slumber Party) | Winner: **Tippy Dos Santos** - **(I Do Bidoo Bidoo)** and **Kim Komatsu** - **(Mga Mumunting Lihim)**: Dawn Balagot (The Animals); Shy Carlos (A Secret Affair); Mayton Eugenio (Dormboys); Glenda Kennedy (Thy Womb); Sweet Plantado (I Doo Bidoo Bidoo) |
Movie Child Performer of the Year
Winner: **Bugoy Cariño (Alagwa)**: Abby Bautista (The Healing); Clarence Delgado (The Mistress); Aaron Junatas (A Mother's Story); Xyriel Manabat (A Mother's Story); Marti San Juan (The Grave Bandits); Miguel Vergara (One More Try)

=== Technical categories ===
| Movie Original Screenplay of the Year | Indie Movie Original Screenplay of the Year |
|---|---|
| Winner: **Mark Meily** - **(El Presidente)**: Kriz Gazmen, Jay Fernando, and Anna Karenina Ramos (One More Try); Roy Iglesias (The Healing); Chris Martinez (I Do Bidoo Bidoo); Erik Matti (Tiktik: The Aswang Chronicles); Senedy Que (A Mother's Story); Vanessa Valdez (The Mistress) | Winner: **Ian Loreños** - **(Alagwa)**: Henry Burgos (Thy Womb); Jerry Gracio (Mater Dolorosa); Jun Robles Lana (Bwakaw); Ron Morales (Graceland); Jose Javier Reyes (Mga Mumunting Lihim); Enrico Santos, Kren Yap, and Willy Laconsay (Amorosa, The Revenge) |
| Movie Cinematographer of the Year | Indie Movie Cinematographer of the Year |
| Winner: **Carlo Mendoza** - **(El Presidente)**: Francis Ricardo Buhay III (Tiktik: The Aswang Chronicles); Hermann Claravall (The Mistress); Larry Manda (I Do Bidoo Bidoo); Charlie Peralta (One More Try); Charlie Peralta (The Healing); Shayne Sarte (A Mother's Story) | Winner: **Odyssey Flores** - **(Thy Womb)**: Rodolfo Aves, Jr. (Mga Mumunting Lihim); Albert Banzon (Mater Dolorosa); Alex Espartero (Supremo); Carlo Mendoza (Bwakaw); Jun Pereira (Intoy Syokoy ng Kalye Marino); Rommel Sales (Alagwa) |
| Movie Production Designer of the Year | Indie Movie Production Designer of the Year |
| Winner: '**Danny Red and Joel Bilbao** - **(El Presidente)**: Nancy Arcega (One More Try); Peter Collias and Benjamin Padero (Tiktik: The Aswang Chronicles); Shari Marie Montiague (The Mistress); Digo Ricio (I Do Bidoo Bidoo); Erick Torralba, Richard Somes, Fritz Silorio (The Healing); Elfren Vibar, Jr. (A Mother's Story) | Winner: **Dante Mendoza** - **(Thy Womb)**: Adolfo Alix, Jr. (Mater Dolorosa); Joey Luna (Bwakaw); Erin John Martyr and Adrian Torres (Supremo); Ericson Navarro (Alagwa); Benjamin Payumo (Intoy Syokoy ng Kalye Marino); Rolando Rubenecia (Graceland) |
| Movie Editor of the Year | Indie Movie Editor of the Year |
| Winner: **Jason Cahapay and Ryan Orduña** - **(El Presidente)**: Mitos Briones (A Mother's Story); Vito Cajili (One More Try); Randy Gabriel (I Do Bidoo Bidoo); Jay Halili (Tiktik: The Aswang Chronicles); Marya Ignacio (The Mistress); Jerrold Tarog (The Healing) | Winner: **Dempster Samarista** - **(Alagwa)**: Tyrone Acierto (The Grave Bandits); Lawrence Ang (Bwakaw); Vanessa de Leon (Mga Mumunting Lihim); Ron Morales, James Lesage, and Jorge Olortegui (Graceland); Kats Seraon (Thy Womb); Benjamin Tolentino (Mater Dolorosa) |
| Movie Musical Scorer of the Year | Indie Movie Musical Scorer of the Year |
| Winner:**Vincent de Jesus** - **(I Do Bidoo Bidoo)**: Von de Guzman (Tiktik: The Aswang Chronicles); Von de Guzman and Jessie Lasaten (The Mistress); Fred Ferraz (A Mother's Story); Jessie Lasaten (El Presidente); Raul Mitra (One More Try); Jerrold Tarog (The Healing) | Winner: **Von de Guzman** - **&(Supremo)**: Teresa Barrozo (Thy Womb); Eigen Ignacio (Mater Dolorosa); Jesse Lucas (Mga Mumunting Lihim); Jema Pamintuan (Bwakaw); Adam Schoenberg and Steven Schoenberg (Graceland); Gab Valenciano (Alagwa) |
| Movie Sound Engineer of the Year | Indie Movie Sound Engineer of the Year |
| Winner: **Corinne de San Jose and Ditoy Aguila** - **(Tiktik: The Aswang Chronicles)**: Aurel Claro Bilbao (The Mistress); Fred Ferraz (A Mother's Story); Albert Michael Idioma (I Do Bidoo Bidoo); Mike Idioma (The Healing); Albert Michael Idioma and Addiss Tabong (El Presidente); Arnel Labayo (One More Try) | Winner: **Ditoy Aguila and Mark Locsin (Mater Dolorosa)**: Antonieto Carlos (Supremo); Stevie Gimmaria (Graceland); Albert Michael Idioma and Addiss Tabong (Mga Mumunting Lihim); Albert Michael Idioma and Addiss Tabong (Thy Womb); Mark Locsin and Alex Tomboc (Bwakaw); Dempster Samarista (Alagwa) |
| Movie Original Theme Song of the Year | Indie Movie Original Theme Song of the Year |
| Winner: **"Aking Inang Bayan"** from the movie El Presidente. Composed by Marizen Soriano, arranged by Jessie Lasaten. Interpreted by Maita Ejercito: "El Presidnete" from the movie El Presidente. Composed and arranged by Jamir Garcia. Interpreted by Apl de Ap.; "Sakaling Malimutan Ka" from the movie A Mother's Story. Composed and arranged by Dodjie Simon. Interpreted by Carol Banawa | Winner: **"Saan Ako Tutungo"** from the movie Migrante. Composed by Lucien Letaba, Rody Vera, and Boni Ilagan, arranged by Melvin Corpin. Interpreted by Honey Araneta: "Balik-Tanaw" from the movie Potpot. Composed by Cezar Julius Decena Jr., Noel Derwin Enmil Jr., Mark Jayson Morante; arranged by Noel Derwin Enmil Jr. Interpreted by Pulidong Mensahero; "Di Maipaliwanag" from the movie Slumber Party. Composed by Shielbert Manuel, arranged by Shielbert Manuel and Braduz Zon. Interpreted by Og Sacred; "Wonderful Thing" from the movie Slumber Party. Composed and arranged by Robert Quilao. Interpreted by Juan Lunar |

=== Special awards ===
Darling of the Press

Winner: **Isko Moreno**

- Ai-Ai dela Alas
- Toni Gonzaga
- Vicky Morales
- Aga Muhlach
- Derek Ramsay
- Ramon "Bong" Revilla, Jr.
- Sylvia Sanchez

- Nora Aunor Ulirang Artista Lifetime Achievement Award – **Senator Lito Lapid**
- Ulirang Alagad ng Pelikula Sa Likod ng Kamera – **Romy Vitug** (cinematographer)
