= Prinsesa ng Banyera =

2007–08 Philippine television drama series

- Title card
- Also known as: Fish Port Princess
- Genre: Drama; Soap opera
- Created by: ABS-CBN Studios
- Written by: Lobert Villela
- Directed by: Andoy L. Ranay; Rechie A. Del Carmen
- Starring: Kristine Hermosa; Angelika Dela Cruz; Ara Mina; TJ Trinidad; Rafael Rosell; Jaclyn Jose; Allan Paule; Shamaine Buencamino; Dino Imperial; Lollie Mara
- Theme music composer: George Canseco
- Ending theme: "Dito Ba?" by Sheryn Regis
- Country of origin: Philippines
- Original language: Filipino
- No. of episodes: 163

Production
- Executive producers: Carlo Katigbak; Cory Vidanes; Laurenti Dyogi; Enrico Santos
- Producer: Ellen Nicolas Criste
- Production locations: Batangas; Manila
- Running time: 45 minutes

Original release
- Network: ABS-CBN
- Release: October 8, 2007 – May 23, 2008

Prinsesa ng Banyera (International title: Fish Port Princess / transl. Princess of the Fish Bucket) is a Philippine television drama series broadcast by ABS-CBN. Directed by Andoy L. Ranay and Rechie A. Del Carmen, it stars Kristine Hermosa, Angelika Dela Cruz, TJ Trinidad, Rafael Rosell, Ara Mina, Jaclyn Jose, Shamaine Buencamino, Allan Paule, Dino Imperial and Lollie Mara. It aired on the network's afternoon line up and worldwide on TFC from October 8, 2007 to May 23, 2008, and was replaced by Ligaw na Bulaklak.

The TV series also aired in Malaysia via TV3 (Malaysia) weekdays in 2010.

The series was streaming online on YouTube.

== Production ==
The TV series marked Kristine Hermosa's comeback to television drama and her first daytime telenovela for the network. This marked her second pairing with her successful team up with actor TJ Trinidad after Gulong ng Palad. The series was also a planned primetime project and also delayed one week internationally but aired the entire first week on its Saturday afternoon block on The Filipino Channel (TFC). The series received well with mixed reviews because it used formulas from Mexican and Filipino storylines. This also served a comeback for 80's model and actress Lyka Ugarte in her acting career. The series was moved to 2:45 pm after timeslot issues. This marked Angelika Dela Cruz's second television rivalry with Kristine Hermosa after the 2003-2004 internationally acclaimed drama Sana'y Wala Nang Wakas after Angelika Dela Cruz departed from her home network. In late 2007, Ara Mina and Oyo Sotto from GMA 7 transferred to the network as regulars and successfully raised ratings.

== Plot ==
Prinsesa Ng Banyera is an afternoon soap opera ABS-CBN and became the first afternoon drama with a primetime storyline.

Maningning (Kristine Hermosa) grew up living with her younger brother under the cruelty of her mother Virgie (Jaclyn Jose) because of love. However, Virgie blames Maningning for the misfortunes throughout her life.

The story revolves around the fish market, and the real lives of people in the society where men rule the ports. While Maningning has hopes of finding her sister Mayumi, the latter managed to trace their biological father (Allan Paule), who is married to the scheming Eleanor (Lyka Ugarte). 14 years later upon visiting her hometown in Batangas, Mayumi (Angelika Dela Cruz) recognizes her twin sister and mother who do not notice her at first. Now living the life she ever wanted as Daphne Pertierra, Mayumi does not know that her true identity will come back to haunt her as Maningning is first hired as a laundry woman for the Perrei household, then eventually as a caretaker for the Pertierra matriarch Consuelo. As Maningning hides the truth about her work and studies to give her brother Habagat a good life, and saving money for his further education, this dismays Daphne. Daphne’s fiancé Charles (Rafael Rosell) will take a certain like to Maningning; to make matters worse, Charles' mother does not accept her for her son. So, Daphne has plans to ruin Maningning and as time begins to run out, Maningning finds out Daphne's real identity.

Their last remembrance together now is at their home in the pier as they reunite but someone ends up shooting Daphne unknowingly. Maningning is blamed for her twin sister's demise by Eleanor. A new woman named Cassandra Ynarez (Ara Mina) arrives, and ends up causing harm in Maningning's life.

== Cast and characters ==
=== Main cast ===
| Actor | Character | Character Description |
|---|---|---|
| Kristine Hermosa | Maningning Burgos / Maningning Pertierra | Twin sister of Mayumi and older half-sister of Habagat. Maningning is very loving and caring towards her family. Since childhood, she has always been the darling of the fish port where she is endearingly called the "Prinsesa ng Banyera" — the tough chick among the equally tough men who are her dear and precious friends, the rose among the thorns. She is beautiful and sweet-looking but is tough. She is also sincere and kindhearted yet practical and honest. |
| Angelika Dela Cruz | Mayumi Burgos / Daphne G. Pertierra | Twin sister of Maningning and older half-sister of Habagat. Mayumi is selfish and manipulative. Since childhood, she dreams to be rich and have a lavish life for herself even if it meant abandoning the people who love her, including her mother and siblings. She will face the harsh reality that everything she ever wanted was not meant for her but is actually destined for her sister, Maningning. |
| Ara Mina | Cassandra Ynarez | Maningning and Mayumi’s half-sister and Sigmund Pertierra's long lost daughter. She and Eleanor team up to make Maningning's life miserable. She wants Sigmund to pay for all the pain he caused to her and her family. |
| TJ Trinidad | Eric Fragante | Grew up without knowing who his real parents are, but is content and happy with his life. He is good-looking in a dirty, dowdy way. Eric is a jeepney driver with a dream of becoming a lawyer. He is one of Maningning’s childhood friends in the neighborhood, the one who always cares for her. Rosa’s biological son and Charles’ older half-brother. |
| Rafael Rosell | Charles C. Perrei | The rich, handsome son of Rosa. Has always been Daphne’s object of affection. Daphne does not know it is her twin sister he truly loves. His rival to Maningning’s heart is his own half-brother: Eric Fragante. |
| Jaclyn Jose | Virgie Burgos | The mother of twin sisters Maningning and Mayumi and youngest son Habagat. In her pursuit to love unconditionally, Virgie falls victim to the exploitation of others. Her simple heart cannot fathom the tragic events in her life. So she lived her life bitter and full of rage. |
| Dino Imperial | Habagat Burgos | Maningning and Mayumi's younger half-brother. He is a good son and student, but will later on be caught in the ways of crime and illegal business. Habagat is a typical teenager who is pressured with having the finer things in life. He will eventually fall in love with Sandy. |
| Shamaine Centenera-Buencamino | Rosa Perrei | Long-time best friend of Virgie who worked at the bar as a hostess. Because of money, she fooled her own best friend causing the latter’s traumatic incident. Now she is a high society woman married to a foreign diplomat, together with her son Charles. If her awful past is discovered, her dreams will be shattered. Rosa does not know that Eric is her first-born biological son that she gave up when she was young. |
| Lollie Mara | Doña Consuelo Pertierra | Doña Consuelo is the strong-willed and dominating matriarch of Sigmund’s household. Despite her disposition, her age starts to drag her slower as she becomes more compassionate and understanding. Maningning, Daphne and Cassandra’s paternal grandmother. |
| Allan Paule | Sigmund Pertierra | Father of Maningning, Daphne, and Cassandra. In his prime, he was the town’s rich brat who fell in love with Virgie. He raped her and becomes the biological father of twins Maningning and Mayumi. However, it is revealed that he is not the biological father of the twins. He is an obedient son to his mother, even to a fault. But whenever his mother is away, he rebels in his own way. He is married to Eleanor. |

=== Supporting cast ===
- Oyo Boy Sotto as Victor Abad
- Andi Eigenmann as Sandy
- Stella Cañete as Myrna Fragante
- Neil Ryan Sese as Harry Medina: He is revealed to be the biological father of the twins.
- Frances Makil-Ignacio as Mayor Violeta Villar
- Chokoleit as Chita
- Ketchup Eusebio as Conrad “Bukol” Okoy
- Micah Muñoz as Ferpecto “Octopus” Castillo
- Ping Medina as Armand Arellano
- Maricar de Mesa as Lilibeth
- Lyka Ugarte as Eleanor Guevarra-Pertierra
- Mark Denzel Delgado as Bryan Fragante
- Lance Jericho Reblando as Pusit Castillo
- Micah Roi Torre as Ula
- Isabel Blaesi
- Cherry Cosio
- Madeleine Nicolas

=== Special participation ===
- Nonie Buencamino as Joel Burgos†
- Denise Laurel as teen Virgie
- Ira Eigenmann as teen Rosa
- Joem Bascon as teen Sigmund
- Joseph Bitangcol as teen Harry
- Jeremiah Rosales as teen Joel
- Jane Oineza as young Maningning
- Kathryn Bernardo as young Mayumi/Daphne
- Kristofer Martin Dangculos as young Eric
- Kyle Balili as young Bukol
- Basty Alcances as young Octopus
- Fraz Yap as Young Charles
- Karlos Buted as young Armand
- Arlene Sebastian as Rosanna
- Jill Paragas as Antonia
- Relleyson Salazar as Goku
- Danielle Thomas P. Velasco as Pooker

== Production notes ==
- Director: Andoy Ranay, Rechie Del Carmen
- Business Unit Head: Enrico Santos
- Production Manager: Rizza Ebriega
- Executive Producer: Ellen Criste
- Creative Manager: Jake Tordesillas
- Headwriter: Keiko Aquino
- Writers: Lobert Villela, Genesis Rodriguez, Bridgette Ann Rebuca, Jerik de Guzman, Rizalino Pinlac

== Trivia ==
- This is Kristine Hermosa's second soap with TJ Trinidad after their very successful soap opera Gulong ng Palad back in 2006.
- Both of the lead stars were former girlfriends of Jericho Rosales.
- Andi Eigenmann (who played Sandy) is Jaclyn Jose's daughter in real life and this is her first teleserye before being the lead in the 2010 primetime television drama series Agua Bendita.
- This is Angelika Dela Cruz and Kristine Hermosa's reunion series after their hit Sana'y Wala Nang Wakas.
- This was Angelika Dela Cruz's last TV series on ABS-CBN before she transferred to GMA 7.
- Due to Angelika Dela Cruz's departure from ABS-CBN to GMA 7, Ara Mina replaced her. Also added is Oyo Sotto. Both stars are from GMA 7 transferred to ABS-CBN but Mina returned several times to her home network.
- This became an ABS-CBN's highest-rated daytime television series that ran for 9 months straight and the first rivalry and casting for Kristine Hermosa and Ara Mina.
- ABS-CBN adapted the soap to have a characteristic to fairy tales but set in much of a different world Pinoy style in the gamble outskirts of poverty markets and in gambling world where there is only one princess and who is the real heiress after Angelika de la Cruz's character Mayumi/Daphne's death in a different world where men rule the courtyards and woman were just housewives.
- This television series began rumors of Kristine Hermosa and Oyo Boy Sotto seeing each other and became eventually true.
- The court case between Kristine Hermosa's character that she killed her sister (which was not true) had to have an advisory by ABS-CBN because of its fictional yet real-life situation.
- Conflict on the set sparked between Past Resident Director Andoy Ranay and Kristine Hermosa sparked news on each sides, and was mostly the biggest news on television and showbiz magazine variety talk shows on its run.
- This was the second teleserye that Angelika Dela Cruz's character was killed due to transfer of the rival network GMA. The first teleserye was Esperanza she transferred in GMA in 1999 and back to ABS-CBN in year 2003).
- This was the last appearance of TJ Trinidad in this series before he also transferred to GMA 7 in 2009.

== See also ==
- List of programs broadcast by ABS-CBN
