= Entertainment Konek =

- Genre: Talk show
- Presented by: Ai-Ai delas Alas; Angelika Dela Cruz
- Country of origin: Philippines
- Original language: Filipino
- No. of episodes: 67

Production
- Running time: 60 minutes
- Production company: ABS-CBN Studios

Original release
- Network: ABS-CBN
- Release: February 5, 2005 – May 27, 2006

Related
- EK Channel; Entertainment Live

Entertainment Konek (lit. Entertainment Connect) is a Philippine television talk show broadcast by ABS-CBN. Hosted by Ai-Ai delas Alas and Angelika Dela Cruz, it aired on the network's Saturday evening line up from February 5, 2005, to May 27, 2006, replacing EK Channel.

== Hosts ==
- Ai-Ai delas Alas
- Angelika Dela Cruz
- Toni Gonzaga
- Ogie Diaz
- Dominic Ochoa
- Derek Ramsay
- MJ Felipe
- Direk Jose Javier Reyes
- Ricci Chan
- Stephanie Camacho
- Boobita Rose
- Paolo Buttones

== See also ==
- List of programs broadcast by ABS-CBN
- List of Philippine television shows
- Entertainment Konek at Telebisyon.net
