= List of Onanay episodes =

Onanay is a 2018 Philippine family drama series broadcast by GMA Network. The series aired on the network's Telebabad evening block and worldwide via GMA Pinoy TV from August 6, 2018, to March 15, 2019, replacing Kambal, Karibal.

NUTAM (Nationwide Urban Television Audience Measurement) People in Television Homes ratings are provided by AGB Nielsen Philippines.

== Series overview ==
Month	Episodes	Monthly averages
Month	Episodes	NUTAM
August 2018	20	11.0%
September 2018	20	10.8%
October 2018	23	10.7%
November 2018	22	10.6%
December 2018	21	10.7%
January 2019	23	11.3%
February 2019	20	12.3%
March 2019	11	12.6%
Total	160	11.3%

== Episodes ==
=== August 2018 ===
Episode		Original air date	Social media hashtag	AGB Nielsen NUTAM People Television in homes			Ref.
Episode		Original air date	Social media hashtag	Audience Share	Timeslot rank	Whole day rank	Ref.
1	"Pilot"	August 6, 2018	#Onanay	11.6%	#1	#2	
2	"Pagsubok" (Trial)	August 7, 2018	#OnanayPagsubok	11.0%	#1	#4	
3	"Kapit, Elvin Ko" (Hold On, My Elvin)	August 8, 2018	#OnanayKapitElvinKo	9.6%	#1	#5	
4	"Laban Lang" (Fighting)	August 9, 2018	#OnanayLabanLang	11.7%	#1	#3	
5	"Ang Pagtatagpo" (The Encounter)	August 10, 2018	#OnanayAngPagtatagpo	10.4%	#1	#5	
6	"Pagmamahal sa Anak" (Love for Child)	August 13, 2018	#OnanayPagmamahalSaAnak	10.6%	#1	#5	
7	"Ang Paghaharap" (The Confrontation)	August 14, 2018	#OnanayAngPaghaharap	10.9%	#1	#4	
8	"Hindi Susuko" (Will not Give Up)	August 15, 2018	#OnanayHindiSusuko	11.4%	#1	#3	
9	"Pag-aalala" (Concern)	August 16, 2018	#OnanayPagaalala	11.2%	#1	#3	
10	"Maila at Natalie" (Maila and Natalie)	August 17, 2018	#OnanayMailaAtNatalie	11.0%	#1	#3	
11	"Pagtulong" (Helping)	August 20, 2018	#OnanayPagtulong	11.7%	#1	#3	
12	"Kaibigan, Kapatid" (Friend, Sister)	August 21, 2018	#OnanayKaibiganKapatid	10.9%	#2	#4	
13	"Onanay Loves Maila"	August 22, 2018	#OnanayLovesMaila	11.1%	#2	#6	
14	"Pagmamahal ng Ina" (Love of a Mother)	August 23, 2018	#OnanayPagmamahalNgIna	11.6%	#2	#3	
15	"Maila Meets Helena"	August 24, 2018	#OnanayMailaMeetsHelena	11.0%	#2	#3	
16	"Muling Pagkikita" (Meeting Again)	August 27, 2018	#OnanayMulingPagkikita	10.9%	#1	#3	
17	"Bayad Utang" (Pay Credit)	August 28, 2018	#OnanayBayadUtang	10.5%	#1	#3	
18	"Pangangailangan" (Needs)	August 29, 2018	#OnanayPangangailangan	10.9%	#1	#2	
19	"Galit ni Helena" (Helena's Anger)	August 30, 2018	#OnanayGalitNiHelena	11.4%	#2	#4	
20	"Paghaharap" (Confrontation)	August 31, 2018	#OnanayPaghaharap	11.0%	#1	#3	

=== September 2018 ===
Episode		Original air date	Social media hashtag	AGB Nielsen NUTAM People in Television Homes			Ref.
Episode		Original air date	Social media hashtag	Rating	Timeslot rank	Whole day rank	Ref.
21	"Face to Face"	September 3, 2018	#OnanayFaceToFace	10.6%	#1	#5	
22	"Huli Ka, Helena" (I Caught You, Helena)	September 4, 2018	#OnanayHuliKaHelena	10.7%	#1	#4	
23	"Awit Kay Inay" (Song for Mom)	September 5, 2018	#OnanayAwitKayInay	9.8%	#1	#5	
24	"Dalamhati ng Ina" (Mother's Grief)	September 6, 2018	#OnanayDalamhatiNgIna	9.9%	#2	#5	
25	"Panloloko o Katotohanan?" (Fraud or Truth?)	September 7, 2018	#OnanayPanlolokoOKatotohanan	10.4%	#1	#5	
26	"Nelia vs. Helena"	September 10, 2018	#OnanayNeliaVsHelena	8.8%	#2	#7	
27	"Hustisya" (Justice)	September 11, 2018	#OnanayHustisya	10.9%	#1	#4	
28	"Pag-asa" (Hope)	September 12, 2018	#OnanayPagAsa	10.5%	#2	#5	
29	"Paglaya" (Freedom)	September 13, 2018	#OnanayPaglaya	10.9%	#1	#4	
30	"Pakikipaglaban" (Fighting)	September 14, 2018	#OnanayPakikipaglaban	10.3%	#2	#6	
31	"Awa o Pagmamahal?" (Mercy or Love?)	September 17, 2018	#OnanayAwaOPagmamahal	10.2%	#2	#5	
32	"Kita Kita" (I See You)	September 18, 2018	#OnanayKitaKita	10.3%	#2	#5	
33	"Tamang Hinala" (Right Suspicion)	September 19, 2018	#OnanayTamangHinala	9.1%	#2	#6	
34	"Moment of Truth"	September 20, 2018	#OnanayMomentOfTruth	10.0%	#2	#5	
35	"Pagtakas" (Escape)	September 21, 2018	#OnanayPagtakas	10.4%	#2	#6	
36	"Tahanan" (Home)	September 24, 2018	#OnanayTahanan	10.7%	#1	#4	
37	"Pagtatago" (Hiding)	September 25, 2018	#OnanayPagtatago	10.6%	#1	#4	
38	"Pagpapanggap" (Pretending)	September 26, 2018	#OnanayPagpapanggap	9.9%	#2	#6	
39	"Resbak" (Revenge)	September 27, 2018	#OnanayResbak	10.3%	#1	#4	
40	"Panggigipit" (Harassment)	September 28, 2018	#OnanayPanggigipit	10.1%	#1	#3	

=== October 2018 ===
Episode		Original air date	Social media hashtag	AGB Nielsen NUTAM People Television in homes			Ref.
Episode		Original air date	Social media hashtag	Audience Share	Timeslot rank	Whole day rank	Ref.
41	"Multo ng Nakaraan" (Ghost of the Past)	October 1, 2018	#OnanayMultoNgNakaraan	9.9%	#2		
42	"Truth Will Prevail"	October 2, 2018	#OnanayTruthWillPrevail	10.4%	#2		
43	"Painful Truth"	October 3, 2018	#OnanayPainfulTruth	10.1%	#2		
44	"Facing the Truth"	October 4, 2018	#OnanayFacingTheTruth	10.1%	#2		
45	"Selos" (Envy)	October 5, 2018	#OnanaySelos	10.9%	#1		
46	"Episode 46"	October 8, 2018	#Onanay	10.1%	#2		
47	"Katibayan" (Proof)	October 9, 2018	#OnanayKatibayan	10.1%	#2		
48	"Kapit Kamay" (Holding Hands)	October 10, 2018	#OnanayKapitKamay	10.3%	#2		
49	"Tagapagtanggol" (Defender)	October 11, 2018	#OnanayTagapagtanggol	10.0%	#2		
50	"Pagtatagpo" (Encounter)	October 12, 2018	#OnanayPagtatagpo	10.6%	#1		
51	"Pagpapanggap" (Pretending)	October 15, 2018	#OnanayPagpapanggap	10.1%	#2		
52	"Panganib" (Danger)	October 16, 2018	#OnanayPanganib	11.4%	#1		
53	"Pagligtas" (Saving)	October 17, 2018	#OnanayPagligtas	10.8%	#1	#4	
54	"MaiLiver"	October 18, 2018	#OnanayMaiLiver	11.0%	#2		
55	"Rebelasyon" (Revelation)	October 19, 2018	#OnanayRebelasyon	11.8%	#1	#3	
56	"Paglilihim" (Concealment)	October 22, 2018	#OnanayPaglilihim	11.6%	#1	#4	
57	"Konsensya" (Conscience)	October 23, 2018	#OnanayKonsensya	11.4%	#1		
58	"Pagtatapat" (Adduction)	October 24, 2018	#OnanayPagtatapat	10.7%	#2		
59	"Heartbreak"	October 25, 2018	#OnanayHeartbreak	11.0%	#2		
60	"Sagot sa Panalangin" (Answer for Prayer)	October 26, 2018	#OnanaySagotSaPanalangin	11.0%	#2	#5	
61	"Totoong Salarin" (True Suspect)	October 29, 2018	#OnanayTotoongSalarin	11.2%	#2		
62	"Harapan" (Facade)	October 30, 2018	#OnanayHarapan	11.4%	#2	#6	
63	"Pagtanggi" (Rejection)	October 31, 2018	#OnanayPagtanggi	11.2%	#2		

=== November 2018 ===
Episode		Original air date	Social media hashtag	AGB Nielsen NUTAM People in Television Homes			Ref.
Episode		Original air date	Social media hashtag	Rating	Timeslot rank	Whole day rank	Ref.
64	"Viral"	November 1, 2018	#OnanayViral	10.5%	#2		
65	"Ganti Para sa Ina" (Revenge for a Mother)	November 2, 2018	#OnanayGantiParaSaIna	9.2%	#2		
66	"Desisyon" (Decision)	November 5, 2018	#OnanayDesisyon	10.0%	#2		
67	"Pag-amin" (Confession)	November 6, 2018	#OnanayPagAmin	11.3%	#1		
68	"Pag-asa" (Hope)	November 7, 2018	#OnanayPagAsa	11.4%	#2	#3	
69	"Voice of Truth"	November 8, 2018	#OnanayVoiceOfTruth	11.3%	#2	#5	
70	"Pananagutan" (Responsibility)	November 9, 2018	#OnanayPananagutan	9.7%	#2		
71	"Pamilya o Sarili" (Family or Self)	November 12, 2018	#OnanayPamilyaOSarili	9.0%	#2		
72	"Palit Buhay" (Change Life)	November 13, 2018	#OnanayPalitBuhay	8.6%	#2		
73	"Para kay Maila" (For Maila)	November 14, 2018	#OnanayParaKayMaila	9.0%	#2		
74	"Officially"	November 15, 2018	#OnanayOfficially	9.7%	#2		
75	"Proud"	November 16, 2018	#OnanayProud	8.6%	#2		
76	"Paninirang Puri" (Praise Breaker)	November 19, 2018	#OnanayPaninirangPuri	9.4%	#2		
77	"Fake News"	November 20, 2018	#OnanayFakeNews	11.4%	#2		
78	"Panlilinlang" (Deception)	November 21, 2018	#OnanayPanlilinlang	11.4%	#2		
79	"Pangamba" (Fear)	November 22, 2018	#OnanayPangamba	12.3%	#2		
80	"Pagkakaisa" (Unity)	November 23, 2018	#OnanayPagkakaisa	11.2%	#2	#5	
81	"The Promise"	November 26, 2018	#OnanayThePromise	11.3%	#2		
82	"Walang Susuko" (No Giving Up)	November 27, 2018	#OnanayWalangSusuko	12.2%	#2		
83	"The Return"	November 28, 2018	#OnanayTheReturn	12.2%	#2		
84	"The Comeback"	November 29, 2018	#OnanayTheComeback	12.0%	#2		
85	"Maling Akala" (Wrong Thought)	November 30, 2018	#OnanayMalingAkala	11.7%	#2		

=== December 2018 ===
Episode		Original air date	Social media hashtag	AGB Nielsen NUTAM People Television in homes			Ref.
Episode		Original air date	Social media hashtag	Audience Share	Timeslot rank	Whole day rank	Ref.
86	"Galit ni Natalie" (Natalie's Anger)	December 3, 2018	#OnanayGalitNiNatalie	12.2%	#2		
87	"Ina Para sa Anak" (Mother in favor of Child)	December 4, 2018	#OnanayInaParaSaAnak	11.0%	#2		
88	"Paalam" (Goodbye)	December 5, 2018	#OnanayPaalam	11.3%	#2		
89	"Sa Hirap at Ginhawa" (With Difficulty and Comfort)	December 6, 2018	#OnanaySaHirapAtGinhawa	10.3%	#2		
90	"Amanos" (Quits)	December 7, 2018	#OnanayAmanos	10.5%	#2		
91	"Pride"	December 10, 2018	#OnanayPride	10.7%	#2		
92	"Busilak na Puso" (Pure Heart)	December 11, 2018	#OnanayBusilakNaPuso	11.9%	#2		
93	"Danger"	December 12, 2018	#OnanayDanger	12.1%	#2		
94	"Pagbangon" (Rising)	December 13, 2018	#OnanayPagbangon	12.0%	#2		
95	"Aksidente" (Accident)	December 14, 2018	#OnanayAksidente	9.4%	#2		
96	"Survivors"	December 17, 2018	#OnanaySurvivors	11.8%	#1		
97	"Pagmulat" (Make Up)	December 18, 2018	#OnanayPagmulat	12.3%	#1		
98	"It's Our Turn"	December 19, 2018	#OnanayItsOurTurn	10.5%	#1		
99	"Sweet Revenge"	December 20, 2018	#OnanaySweetRevenge	11.5%	#1		
100	"Lady Tower Heart"	December 21, 2018	#OnanayLadyTowerHeart	13.2%	#1		
101	"Alaala" (Memory)	December 24, 2018	#OnanayAlaala	8.0%	#2		
102	"Maligayang Pasko" (Merry Christmas)	December 25, 2018	#OnanayMaligayangPasko	9.5%	#1		
103	"Katotohanan" (Truth)	December 26, 2018	#OnanayKatotohanan	9.0%	#1		
104	"Onanay's Real Daughter"	December 27, 2018	#OnanaysRealDaughter	10.1%	#1		
105	"Pagbawi" (Recovery)	December 28, 2018	#OnanayPagbawi	9.2%	#1		
106	"The Lost Daughter"	December 31, 2018	#OnanayTheLostDaughter	8.6%	#1		

=== January 2019 ===
Episode		Original air date	Social media hashtag	AGB Nielsen NUTAM People Television in homes			Ref.
Episode		Original air date	Social media hashtag	Audience Share	Timeslot rank	Whole day rank	Ref.
107	"New Year, New Life"	January 1, 2019	#OnanayNewYearNewLife	10.7%	#1		
108	"Half Sisters"	January 2, 2019	#OnanayHalfSisters	12.3%	#1		
109	"DNA Test"	January 3, 2019	#OnanayDNATest	11.4%	#1		
110	"Pagtanggi" (Rejection)	January 4, 2019	#OnanayPagtanggi	12.0%	#1		
111	"Connection"	January 7, 2019	#OnanayConnection	11.8%	#1		
112	"Pain"	January 8, 2019	#OnanayPain	11.7%	#2		
113	"Acceptance"	January 9, 2019	#OnanayAcceptance	12.2%	#1		
114	"Pakiusap" (Please)	January 10, 2019	#OnanayPakiusap	12.0%	#1		
115	"Paninindigan" (Affirmation)	January 11, 2019	#OnanayPaninindigan	11.7%	#1		
116	"Plan B"	January 14, 2019	#OnanayPlanB	12.1%	#1		
117	"Justice"	January 15, 2019	#OnanayJustice	11.9%	#1		
118	"Di Susuko" (Not Giving Up)	January 16, 2019	#OnanayDiSusuko	12.4%	#1		
119	"Pagsasakripisyo" (Sacrifice)	January 17, 2019	#OnanayPagsasakripisyo	11.0%	#2		
120	"Kasunduan" (Agreement)	January 18, 2019	#OnanayKasunduan	12.0%	#2		
121	"Daughters"	January 21, 2019	#OnanayDaughters	10.0%	#2		
122	"Higanti" (Revenge)	January 22, 2019	#OnanayHiganti	9.5%	#2		
123	"Buwis Buhay" (Risk One's Life)	January 23, 2019	#OnanayBuwisBuhay	10.5%	#2		
124	"Pag-amin ni Lucas" (Lucas' Confession)	January 24, 2019	#OnanayPagAminNiLucas	10.6%	#2		
125	"Pagsusumamo" (Pleading)	January 25, 2019	#OnanayPagsusumamo	12.0%	#2		
126	"Pagdamay" (Sympathy)	January 28, 2019	#OnanayPagdamay	10.2%	#2		
127	"Nelia"	January 29, 2019	#OnanayNelia	11.0%	#2		
128	"Paninira" (Destruction)	January 30, 2019	#OnanayPaninira	9.4%	#2		
129	"Natalie vs. the Matayog"	January 31, 2019	#OnanayNatalieVsTheMatayog	12.0%	#2		

=== February 2019 ===
Episode		Original air date	Social media hashtag	AGB Nielsen NUTAM People in Television homes			Ref.
Episode		Original air date	Social media hashtag	Audience Share	Timeslot rank	Whole day rank	Ref.
130	"Utos ni Helena" (Helena's Order)	February 1, 2019	#OnanayUtosNiHelena	11.9%	#2		
131	"Hanapan" (Hunt)	February 4, 2019	#OnanayHanapan	12.1%	#2		
132	"Unconditional Love"	February 5, 2019	#OnanayUnconditionalLove	11.8%	#2		
133	"Pagligtas" (Saving)	February 6, 2019	#OnanayPagligtas	12.0%	#2		
134	"Last Will"	February 7, 2019	#OnanayLastWill	12.7%	#1		
135	"Kakampi" (Ally)	February 8, 2019	#OnanayKakampi	11.6%	#2	#3	
136	"Kapahamakan" (Disaster)	February 11, 2019	#OnanayKapahamakan	12.1%	#1	#2	
137	"Para sa Pagmamahal" (For Love)	February 12, 2019	#OnanayParaSaPagmamahal	13.5%	#1		
138	"Di Patatalo" (Undefeated)	February 13, 2019	#OnanayDiPatatalo	11.7%	#2		
139	"Sakripisyo" (Sacrifice)	February 14, 2019	#OnanaySakripisyo	11.7%	#2		
140	"Kapalit Buhay" (Exchange of Life)	February 15, 2019	#OnanayKapalitBuhay	12.7%	#1		
141	"Kinatatakutan" (Fear)	February 18, 2019	#OnanayKinatatakutan	11.9%	#1		
142	"Galit ni Nelia" (Nelia's Anger)	February 19, 2019	#OnanayGalitNiNelia	13.0%	#1		
143	"Finding Maila"	February 20, 2019	#OnanayFindingMaila	13.4%	#1		
144	"Buong Pamilya" (Whole Family)	February 21, 2019	#OnanayBuongPamilya	12.8%	#2		
145	"Bayad Utang" (Pay Credit)	February 22, 2019	#OnanayBayadUtang	13.0%	#1		
146	"Pagkakasundo" (Agreement)	February 25, 2019	#OnanayPagkakasundo	12.3%	#1	#2	
147	"Helena's Downfall"	February 26, 2019	#OnanayHelenasDownfall	11.8%	#2		
148	"Plano" (Plan)	February 27, 2019	#OnanayPlano	11.9%	#1		
149	"Bagong Panganib" (New Danger)	February 28, 2019	#OnanayBagongPanganib	12.5%	#1		

=== March 2019 ===
Episode		Original air date	Social media hashtag	AGB Nielsen NUTAM People in Television homes			Ref.
Episode		Original air date	Social media hashtag	Audience Share	Timeslot rank	Whole day rank	Ref.
150	"Pagbawi" (Recovery)	March 1, 2019	#OnanayPagbawi	13.6%	#1	#2	
151	"Forbidden Love"	March 4, 2019	#OnanayForbiddenLove	12.9%	#1	#2	
152	"Iibig Muli" (Love Again)	March 5, 2019	#OnanayIibigMuli	12.2%	#1	#2	
153	"One Last Chance"	March 6, 2019	#OnanayOneLastChance	11.5%	#2	#3	
154	"Paghabol" (Chase)	March 7, 2019	#OnanayPaghabol	11.8%	#2	#3	
155	"Revelation"	March 8, 2019	#OnanayRevelation	12.8%	#1	#2	
156	"Huling Lunes" (Final Monday)	March 11, 2019	#OnanayHulingLunes	11.9%	#2	#3	
157	"Huling Martes" (Final Tuesday)	March 12, 2019	#OnanayHulingMartes	11.6%	#2	#3	
158	"Huling Miyerkules" (Final Wednesday)	March 13, 2019	#OnanayHulingMiyerkules	12.1%	#2	#3	
159	"Huling Huwebes" (Final Thursday)	March 14, 2019	#OnanayHulingHuwebes	12.9%	#1	#2	
160	"Finale"	March 15, 2019	#OnanayFinale	14.8%	#1	#2	
