= Little Princess (Philippine TV series) =

2022 Philippine television drama series

- Title card
- Genre: Drama
- Written by: Luningning Ribay; Ma. Christina Velasco; Wiro Michael Ladera; Renato Custodio Jr.
- Directed by: L.A. Madridejos; Don Michael Perez
- Creative director: Aloy Adlawan
- Starring: Jo Berry
- Opening theme: "Kung Mayroong Dahilan" by Shanicka Arganda
- Country of origin: Philippines
- Original language: Tagalog
- No. of episodes: 73

Production
- Executive producer: Arlene Del Rosario-Pilapil
- Camera setup: Multiple-camera setup
- Running time: 21–26 minutes
- Production company: GMA Entertainment Group

Original release
- Network: GMA Network
- Release: January 10 – April 22, 2022

Little Princess is a 2022 Philippine television drama series broadcast by GMA Network. Directed by L.A. Madridejos and Don Michael Perez, it stars Jo Berry in the title role. It premiered on January 10, 2022 on the network's Afternoon Prime line up. The series concluded on April 22, 2022, with a total of 73 episodes.

The series is streaming online on YouTube.

== Cast and characters ==
Cast

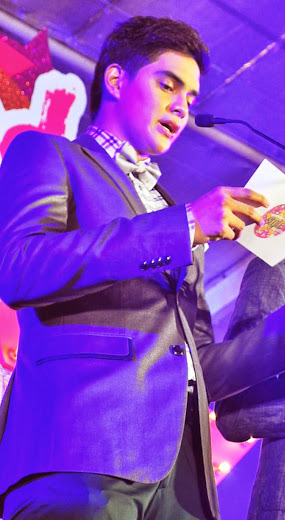
Juancho Triviño

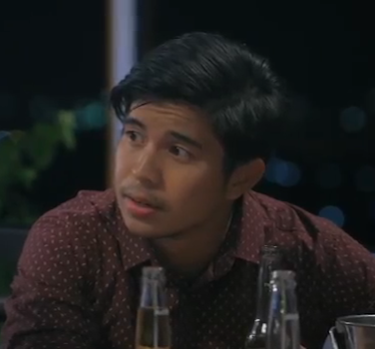
Rodjun Cruz

Lead cast

- Jo Berry as Princess R. Montivano

Supporting cast

- Juancho Triviño as Damien Santiago
- Rodjun Cruz as Jaxon Pineda
- Angelika Dela Cruz as Elise Reyes
- Jestoni Alarcon as Marcus V. Montivano
- Geneva Cruz as Odessa Hidalgo-Montivano
- Jenine Desiderio as Sunshine Pineda
- Gabrielle Hahn as Adrianna Ilustre
- Therese Malvar as Masoy
- Tess Antonio as Winona
- Lander Vera Perez as Donald Santiago
- Chuckie Dreyfus as Fermin Garcia
- Marx Topacio as Aaron
- Melissa Avelino as Melania
- Kaloy Tingcungco as Caloy
- Hannah Precillas as Hannah
- Sheemee Buenaobra as Macy
- Lala Vinzon as Jewel
- Cherry Malvar as Whitney

== Production ==
Principal photography commenced in October 2021.

== Ratings ==
According to AGB Nielsen Philippines' Nationwide Urban Television Audience Measurement People in television homes, the pilot episode of Little Princess earned a 5.9% rating.
