= Subject: I Love You =

- Directed by: Francis dela Torre
- Written by: Francis dela Torre
- Produced by: Barclay DeVeau
- Starring: Briana Evigan; Jericho Rosales; Dean Cain
- Cinematography: Francis dela Torre; Jasmin Kuhn
- Edited by: Richard Uber; Tamara Meem
- Music by: Albert Chang
- Production company: Tectonic Films
- Release date: April 30, 2011 (United States)
- Running time: 97 minutes
- Country: United States
- Languages: English; Tagalog

Subject: I Love You is a 2011 American drama romance film written and directed by Franchis dela Torre, based on the "ILOVEYOU" computer worm of 2000. The film stars Jericho Rosales and Briana Evigan.

== Plot ==
The film tells the story of a young man, Victor, who will do anything to reconnect with Butterfly, the only woman he has ever loved – even if it means entangling himself in an international criminal investigation.

== Cast ==
- Briana Evigan as Butterfly
- Jericho Rosales as Victor
- Dean Cain as James Trapp
- Dante Basco as Nicky
- Kristin Bauer as Sarah Drake
- Lauren Bittner as Renna
- Gary Valenciano as Choy
- Apl.de.Ap as Calessa Driver
- Andrew Leeds as Chris
- Luisse Belle Pressman as Lucy
- Tirso Cruz III as Frankie
- Munda Razooki as Goon
- Ermie Concepcion as Adela
- Joel Torre as Marlon

== See also ==
- Blood Ransom
- ILOVEYOU
