= Magandang Hatinggabi =

1998 film by Laurenti Dyogi

- Directed by: Laurenti Dyogi
- Screenplay by: Ricky Lee
- Produced by: Charo Santos-Concio; Malou Santos; Tess Fuentes
- Starring: Angelika Dela Cruz; Jericho Rosales; Angelica Panganiban; Bojo Molina; Mylene Dizon; Marvin Agustin; Diether Ocampo; Jacklyn Jose; Eula Valdez; Allan Paule; Noni Buencamino
- Narrated by: Noni Buencamino
- Cinematography: Joe Tutanes
- Edited by: Kelly Cruz
- Music by: Greg Caro
- Production company: Star Cinema
- Distributed by: Star Cinema
- Release date: November 4, 1998
- Running time: 100 minutes
- Country: Philippines
- Language: Filipino

Magandang Hatinggabi (lit. 'Good Midnight') is a 1998 Filipino comedy horror anthology film directed by Laurenti Dyogi, and released by Star Cinema. The film is divided into three episodes, each consisting of a different set of stories, characters, and settings. The episodes are presented as urban legends as told by the Fatman (Noni Buencamino) to a group of young people.

== Plot ==
=== Killer Van ===
The episode is about a family who unknowingly bought a haunted van.

=== Kuba ===
This episode is about a woman with a hunched back that harbors a dark secret.

=== Fatman ===
The Fatman's guests learn the horrible truth about him.

== Cast and characters ==
=== Killer Van ===
- Nonie Buencamino as Killer
- Eula Valdez as Carla
- Allan Paule as Rene
- Angelica Panganiban as Myla, Carlo/Paolo's older sister, Carla & Rene's 11-year old daughter.
- Alwyn Uytingco as Carlo/Paolo, Myla's younger brother, Carla & Rene's 10-year old son.
- Lorena Garcia as Ghost, 11-year old daughter.
- Fatima Vargas as Lily's Mom
- Andy Bais as Car dealer

=== Kuba ===
- Angelika Dela Cruz as Marianne
- Jericho Rosales as Darwin
- Jaclyn Jose as Gloria
- Boom Labrusca as Darwin's Friend
- Lui Villaruz as Darwin's Friend
- CJ Tolentino as Darwin's Friend
- Monina Bagatsing as Dahlia
- Corrine Mendez as Tracy
- Mary Kaye De Leon aa Zeny
- Wilson Santiago as Gloria's Husband
- Paz Bautista as Gloria's Double
- Gilberto Lariba as Master Aswang
- Rigor Ferrer as Master Aswang
- Eva Atienza as Marianne's Double
- Noni Buenacamino as Master Kapre

=== Fatman ===
- Noni Buencamino as Fatman
- Marvin Agustin as Frankie
- Diether Ocampo as Louie
- Mylene Dizon as Abby
- Bojo Molina as Richie
- Laura James as Kaye
- Jay Delos Reyes as Slimy Creature
- Kay Flores as Slimy Creature
- Andre Velasco as Greenman
