= EK Channel =

- Genre: Talk show
- Presented by: Ogie Diaz; Rica Peralejo; Angelika Dela Cruz; Marvin Agustin and many others
- Country of origin: Philippines
- Original language: Filipino
- No. of episodes: 33

Production
- Running time: 90 minutes
- Production company: ABS-CBN Entertainment

Original release
- Network: ABS-CBN
- Release: June 19, 2004 – January 29, 2005

Related
- S2: Showbiz Sabado (2003-2004); Entertainment Konek (2005-2006)

EK Channel is a Philippine television talk show broadcast by ABS-CBN. Hosted by Ogie Diaz, Rica Peralejo, Angelika Dela Cruz and Marvin Agustin. It aired from June 19, 2004 to January 29, 2005, replacing the first season of Star Circle Quest and was replaced by Entertainment Konek.

== Hosts ==
- Ogie Diaz
- Rica Peralejo
- Dominic Ochoa
- Angelika Dela Cruz
- Marvin Agustin

== Guest Hosts ==
- Toni Gonzaga
- Jose Javier Reyes

== See also ==
- List of programs broadcast by ABS-CBN
