= Onanay =

Philippine television drama series

- Title card
- Also known as: The Way to Your Heart
- Genre: Drama
- Created by: John Borgy Danao
- Written by: Luningning Interino-Ribay; Obet Villela; Geng delos Reyes-Delgado; Tina Samson-Velasco
- Directed by: Gina Alajar; Joel Lamangan
- Creative director: Roy Iglesias
- Starring: Jo Berry
- Theme music composer: Vehnee Saturno
- Opening theme: "Awit Kay Inay" By Hannah Precillas
- Country of origin: Philippines
- Original language: Tagalog
- No. of episodes: 160 (list of episodes)

Production
- Executive producer: Nieva Sabit
- Editors: Benedict Lavastida; Virgilio Custodio
- Camera setup: Multiple-camera setup
- Running time: 25–48 minutes
- Production company: GMA Entertainment Group

Original release
- Network: GMA Network
- Release: August 6, 2018 – March 15, 2019

Onanay (international title: The Way to Your Heart) is a Philippine television drama series broadcast by GMA Network. Directed by Gina Alajar and Joel Lamangan, it stars Jo Berry in the title role. It premiered on August 6, 2018 on the network's Telebabad line up. The series concluded on March 15, 2019, with a total of 160 episodes.

The series is originally titled as Extraordinary Love. It is streaming online on YouTube.

== Premise ==
Sisters Maila and Natalie have different approach to their mother, Onay who has Achondroplasia. Maila is a nice and attentive daughter, while Natalie is arrogant and disobedient. Besides their different upbringing, they have a different father as well.

== Cast and characters ==
Cast

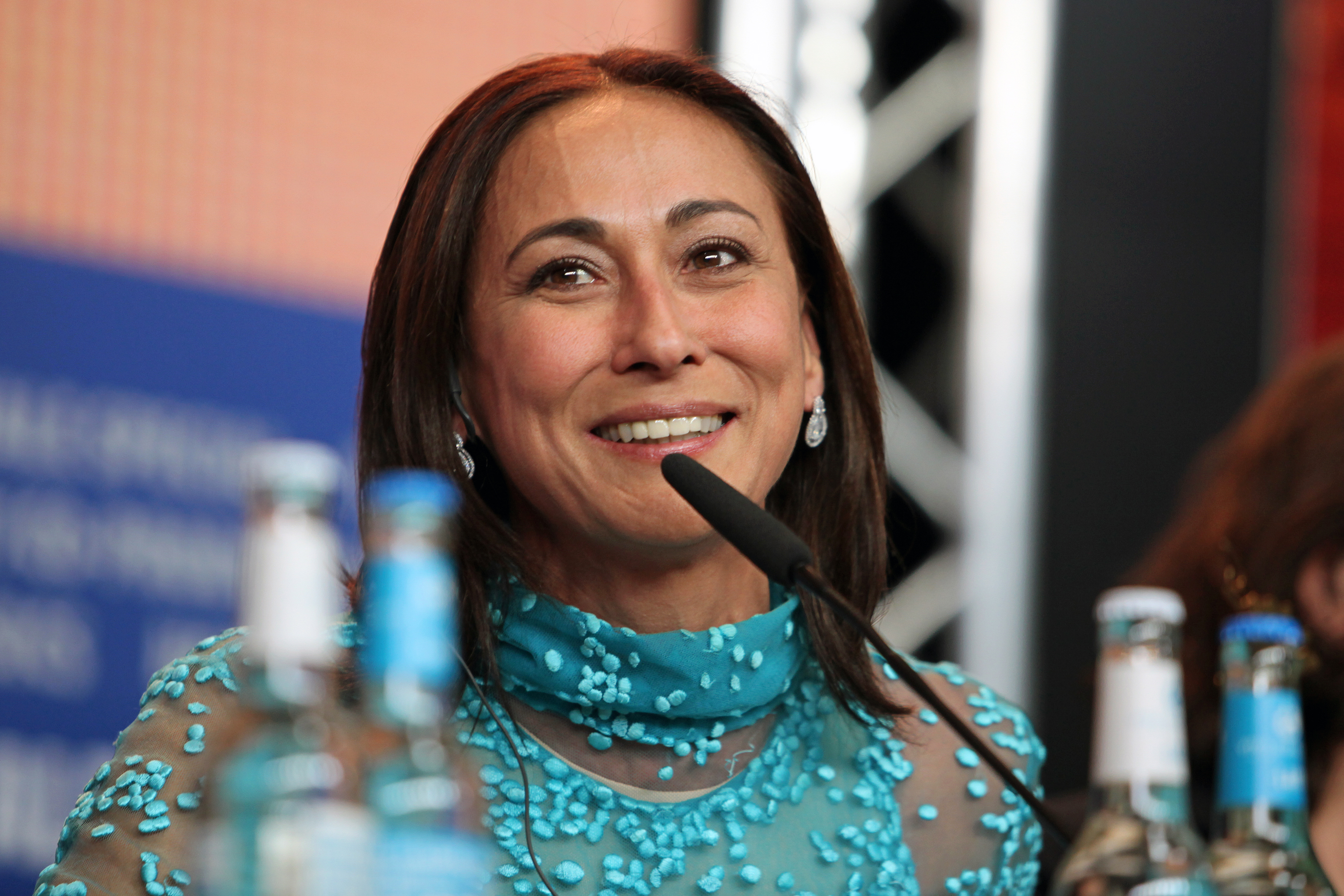
Cherie Gil

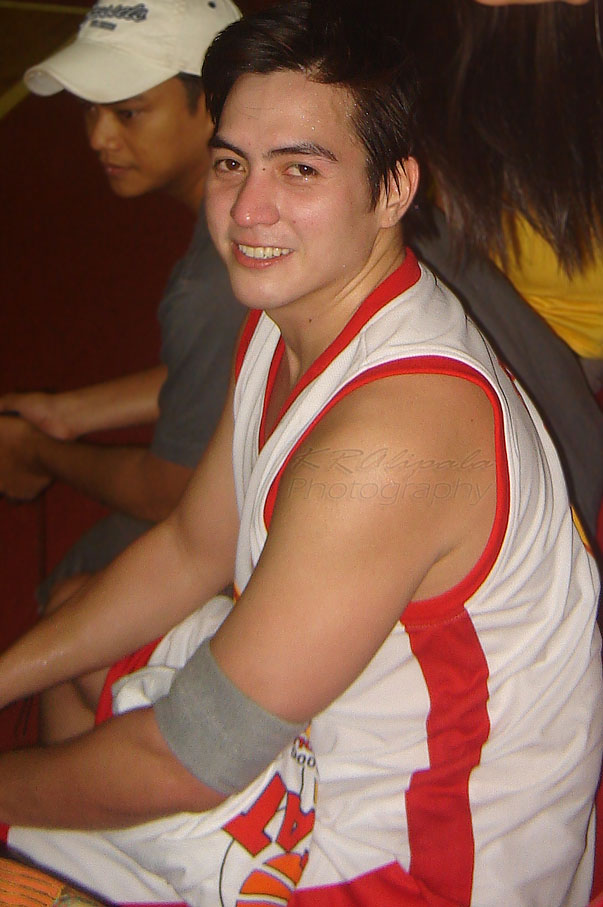
Wendell Ramos

Lead cast

- Jo Berry as Ronalyn "Onay" Matayog-Samonte

Supporting cast

- Mikee Quintos as Maila M. Samonte
- Kate Valdez as Natalie Montenegro / Rosemary M. Montenegro
- Cherie Gil as Helena Sanchez-Montenegro
- Nora Aunor as Cornelia "Nelia" Dimagiba-Matayog
- Wendell Ramos as Lucas Samonte
- Rochelle Pangilinan as Sally del Mundo
- Vaness del Moral as Imelda Pascual
- Enrico Cuenca as Oliver Pascual
- Gardo Versoza as Dante Dimagiba

Guest cast

- Adrian Alandy as Elvin Sanchez Montenegro
- JC Tiuseco as Ronald
- Gilleth Sandico as Soleng
- Rein Adriano as younger Maila
- Princess Aguilar as younger Natalie / Rosemary
- Eunice Lagusad as Kiana
- Marina Benipayo as Agatha Ocampo
- James Teng as James
- Jenzel Angeles as Louise Ocampo
- Liezel Lopez as Wendy
- Ayeesha Cervantes as Danica
- Sofia Pablo as Gracie P. Samonte
- Marnie Lapus as Metring
- Arthur Solinap as Arthur
- Pekto as Hector
- Marco Alcaraz as Vincent "Vince" Delgado
- Neil Ryan Sese as Emmanuel "Emman" Cruz
- Kier Legaspi as Joel
- Janna Victoria as Madel Cruz
- James Blanco as Mark
- Dominic Roco as Castro
- Shermaine Santiago as Marie Chu
- Angel Guardian as Chelsea
- Orlando Sol as Lando

== Ratings ==
According to AGB Nielsen Philippines' Nationwide Urban Television Audience Measurement People in television homes, the pilot episode of Onanay earned an 11.6% rating.

== Accolades ==
Accolades received by Onanay
Year	Award	Category	Recipient	Result	Ref.
2019	33rd PMPC Star Awards for Television	Best Primetime TV Series	Onanay	Nominated	
2019	33rd PMPC Star Awards for Television	Best Drama Actress	Nora Aunor	Nominated	
2019	33rd PMPC Star Awards for Television	Best Drama Supporting Actor	Wendell Ramos	Nominated	
2019	33rd PMPC Star Awards for Television	Best New Female TV Personality	Jo Berry	Nominated	
2019	VP Choice Awards	TV series of the year	Onanay	Nominated	
