= All My Life (2004 film) =

- Movie poster
- Directed by: Laurenti M. Dyogi
- Screenplay by: Mia Concio; Mel Mendoza-del Rosario
- Story by: Mia Concio; Laurenti M. Dyogi
- Produced by: Elma S. Medua
- Starring: Aga Muhlach; Kristine Hermosa
- Cinematography: Martin Jimenez
- Edited by: Marya Ignacio
- Music by: Raul Mitra
- Production company: Star Cinema
- Distributed by: ABS-CBN Film Productions
- Release date: May 26, 2004
- Running time: 110 minutes
- Country: Philippines
- Language: Filipino
- Box office: ₱175 million

All My Life is 2004 Filipino romantic drama film directed by Laurenti M. Dyogi and written by Mia A. Concio and Mel Mendoza-del Rosario from a story concept developed by Concio and Dyogi. The film stars Aga Muhlach and Kristine Hermosa.

Produced and distributed by ABS-CBN Film Productions, the film was theatrically released on May 26, 2004.

The film was the last vhs release under star home video

== Plot ==
Sam (Aga Muhlach), a carefree guy who enjoys life, goes on a cruise. On board Star Cruises, he meets an angry, heartbroken Louie (Kristine Hermosa) who is staying next door. One night, Sam watches a drunk Louie lean on the railing. Thinking she might jump, he stops her. They share a heartfelt moment until Louie throws up on Sam. The next morning, Sam joins Louie for breakfast uninvited and introduces himself. Louie apologizes for how she acted the night before and leaves soon after. They meet again at the gift shop where Louie accuses him of following her. Sam tells her she might want some company as they're both alone on the cruise and that he's just in the next room if she needs a friend. Later, Louie knocks on his door and invites him to dinner as she prefers him over someone else, seeing Sam as "harmless." They talk briefly about their respective jobs. As the cruise docks from place to place, Sam and Louie grew closer, sharing their time traveling together. Over time, Louie's rigid personality softens under Sam's influence. In a temple, Sam is praying and Louie asks him what he's praying for. He admits that he was diagnosed when he was twenty-five with a heart disease and wishes for more time to live. Louie is sad at the confession but Sam plays it off, making it seem like a joke.

Back on board, they go to dinner. They dance and eventually share a kiss. Louie pulls away and runs back to her room where she holds on to a wedding dress hanging from her closet. A flashback scene reveals that Louie was about to get married until a pregnant woman crashes their wedding, saying Joey (Bernard Palanca) is the father. Louie storms out of the church. Back in the present, Sam knocks on her door. Louie tries to tell him about her past but Sam confesses that he knows. During her hasty exit from the aisle, she leaves a shoe, which Sam now returns to her. Feeling betrayed, they part ways. The cruise ends and they go back to their normal lives.

Louie is berated by her mother (Ces Quesada) after coming home, enraged by the scandal of her almost wedding. Her father, Jun (Ricky Davao), is on Louie's side but keeps quiet to not anger Pacita. Louie opens up to her father about meeting someone on the cruise. Finding out she finally came home, Joey tries to reconcile with Louie but to no avail. By accident, Sam sees Louie while stuck in traffic with his cousin Kat (Dimples Romana) and chases after her but they don't meet. Both resume their lives but find it difficult knowing they share a connection, especially Sam whose condition is worsening.

Since the beginning, Louie has a habit of sneezing whenever Sam is around. This eventually causes their reunion. They finally admit their feelings for each other and get together. Louie introduces Sam to her family during Pacita's birthday, immediately earning Jun's approval and eventually Pacita's. However, Sam finds out that he no longer has enough time to recover from his illness and confesses this to Louie, leading them to break up. Both suffer in their separation but Pacita convinces Louie to find Sam, knowing that she would only regret it more if they don't spend his last moments together. Louie goes to his yacht (a family business he briefly mentioned during their time on the cruise) and is found by Kat who tells her he went home. Louie meets Sam's parents who immediately show her to where Sam is.

Walking on the beach, Sam looks on. Louie arrives and sees him lying face down. Worried, she runs to him but finds him conscious, claiming he's just "practicing" for when he dies. They proclaim their love for each other and gets married. They move to a house on a small island and spend every waking moment together. Sam makes videos for Louie in the event of his death. Louie wakes up to find Sam without her side and panics until she sees him in the hut outside, smiling at her. As they look at each other, Sam's eyes fill with tears in realization that this is his last moment. He falls dead and Louie rushes to his side. She goes into mourning.

As the movie ends, Louie is out sitting on the beach and sneezes. She whispers his name, knowing he is near. She looks at the camera, smiles, and calls for "Sammy" — their son. Mother and son enjoy a stroll on the beach. Fast forward to the time when Sammy grows older and looks like his Dad. End

== Cast ==
- Kristine Hermosa as Louisa "Louie"
- Aga Muhlach as Sam
- Ricky Davao as Jun
- Ces Quesada as Pacita
- Dimples Romana as Kat
- Bernard Palanca as Joey
- Carla Martinez as Sylvia
- Bonggoy Manahan as Ben
- Manuel Aquino as Tony
- Gigette Reyes as Hettie
- Lui Villaruz as Jake
- Pia Wurtzbach as Sarah
- Maricel Dimayuga as Leslie
- Angel Jacob as Pregnant Woman
- Cris Daluz as Mang Gene
- Kakai Bautista as the Crying Lady

== Restoration ==
All My Life was digitally restored as part of the ABS-CBN Film Restoration Project from ABS-CBN Corporation in partnership with Central Digital Lab. The restored film was first shown on the ABS-CBN channel on March 5, 2018.

== See also ==
- All My Life (2020 film) - An American romantic drama film released in 2020, based on a true story and also featuring a similar storyline but not a remake.
