= Sana'y Wala Nang Wakas =

2003–04 Philippine television drama series

- Title card
- Also known as: Timeless
- Genre: Drama; Romance; Soap opera
- Directed by: Jerome C. Pobocan; FM Reyes
- Starring: Jericho Rosales; Kristine Hermosa; Diether Ocampo; Angelika Dela Cruz
- Opening theme: "Sana'y Wala Nang Wakas" by Sharon Cuneta; Rearranged by Homer Flores
- Composer: Willy Cruz
- Country of origin: Philippines
- Original language: Filipino
- No. of episodes: 298

Production
- Executive producer: Des de Guzman
- Running time: 30 minutes (original); 45 minutes (compressed)
- Production company: Star Creatives

Original release
- Network: ABS-CBN
- Release: May 19, 2003 – July 9, 2004

Sana'y Wala Nang Wakas (International title: Timeless / transl. I Hope It Never Ends) is a Philippine television drama series broadcast by ABS-CBN. Directed by Jerome C. Pobocan and FM Reyes, it stars by Jericho Rosales, Kristine Hermosa, Diether Ocampo and Angelika Dela Cruz. It aired on the network's Primetime Bida line up and worldwide on TFC from May 19, 2003 to July 9, 2004, and was replaced by Hiram. It is a love story of two star-crossed lovers who suffer for their parents' long forgotten sins. Christian and Ara battle the odd twists and turns of fate in the hopes of protecting a love that withstands the test of time.

The series ran for two seasons in the second to final season Diether Ocampo and Angelika Dela Cruz became new regular cast members leaning in for a new plot twist revolving around Dela Cruz and Rosales' Character and Ocampo and Hermosa's characters on the soap.

This was the first television series in the Philippines to have a finale based solely on the outcome of the text votes from the viewers. They decide between Christian (Rosales) and Leo (Ocampo) on who will tie the knot with Arabella (Hermosa); the finale episode that featured the wedding scene between Christian and Ara aired on July 9, 2004. It was also the only television series in history to simulcast the final five episodes on radio station DZMM Radyo Patrol 630.

Desiree Del Valle's character was introduced in the mid first and second season after she finished the finale of her successful soap Bituin in 2003.

== Plot ==
Falling victim to a freak accident on a ship sailing, Christian (Jericho Rosales) and Ara (Kristine Hermosa) get trapped in an isolated island and fell in love. Reality stepped in when they were rescued and had to go back to their own lives. She felt the difference in their social status. Despite all odds, he promised his eternal love for Ara, unaware of her family's involvement in his painful past.

Upon discovering the truth Christian was driven with anger, which made Ara and her family decided to escape his revenge. This tragic journey leads Ara to meet a rich and carefree painter, Leo (Diether Ocampo). She learned to bury things as they are. And Leo's unconditional love helped her to start anew. Christian, on the other hand, finds comfort with kindhearted Mary Ann (Angelika dela Cruz), an amusing friend who slowly wins Christian's trust and affection.

When romance seems perfect for estranged lovers, fate stepped in and brought Christian back into Ara's life. Ara must now confront her unfinished business with Christian...

While stranded again on the same island they are captured by the rebels and Christian is tortured by the rebels. They are rescued by Leo and they escape with help from a disgruntled rebel. Christian is then shot in the leg just as Leo's brother Ramon and the military arrives to save them. Ara is then fatally shot in the chest by the rebel leader. The rebel leader is then shot to death by the military in response.

What lies beneath their intertwined past? Will Christian and Ara's romance bind together again?

== Cast and characters ==
Main Characters: Ara and Christian

=== Main cast ===
- Jericho Rosales as Christian Soriano - Orphaned at a young age, he is groomed to handle the family's vast powerful companies. He falls in love with Ara, not knowing that she holds a past that could ruin them altogether.
- Kristine Hermosa as Arabella Grace-Garcia/Grace Gonzales - She also happens to be the daughter of Elizabeth who grows up without knowing the love of her mother. She falls in love with Christian, not knowing that this will cause her great pain.
- Diether Ocampo as Leonardo Madrigal III - Leo is the eldest grandson of Don Marcelo, a wealthy plantation owner. And Ramon is his younger brother. They are a product of a broken family since their mother left them at an early age to marry someone else in America. Both brothers were left under the care of Don Marcelo. Leo is also an artist and would rather follow his passion on arts and music rather than manage the hacienda. He is a loving grandson, and is brave enough to fight for what he believes in or for the woman he would eventually fall in love with.
- Angelika Dela Cruz as Mary Ann Santos - Mary Ann is a very cheerful person. Everyone around her is affected by her gaiety. In spite of her troubled past. Her mother was a GRO, who married a man who would do anything for money even if meant, “selling” his stepdaughter. Having escaped her past, she is determined to fulfill her dream of becoming a recording artist. Brave and street smart, in spite of not being able to finish her studies, she would do everything to attain her goals and would do everything for the man she would eventually fall in love with.

=== Supporting cast ===
- Gloria Romero as Doña Valeria Valencia
- Cherry Pie Picache as Elizabeth "Yvette" Valencia
- Joel Torre as Anton Garcia
- Caridad Sanchez as Choleng
- Marvin Agustin as Newton
- Kaye Abad as Shane Diwata
- Desiree del Valle as Francine Soriano
- Luis Alandy as Ramon Madrigal
- Roderick Paulate as Truman
- Gary Estrada as Richard Valencia
- Serena Dalrymple as Rain Soriano
- Julia Clarete as Denise

=== Special guest cast and characters ===
- Jane Oineza as young Arabella Grace-Garcia/Grace Gonzales
- John Manalo as young Christian Soriano
- Kathryn Bernardo as young Shane Diwata
- Joshua Dionisio as young Leonardo Madrigal III
- Karlo Enriquez as young Nicanor
- Troy Martino as Shane's father
- Kimberly Diaz as Einstein's wife
- Carla Humphries as Christian's secretary
- Ilonah Jean as Rhodora Soriano
- Bong Regala as Emilio Soriano
- Bon Vibar as Nicanor Soriano
- Nina Ricci Alagao as Bettina
- Minnie Aguilar as Shane's mother
- Ward Luarca as Orly
- Marithez Samson as Lucy
- Cholo Escaño as Einstein
- Crispin Pineda as Young Orly
- Tin Arnaldo as Young Valeria
- Boy Abunda as himself
- Karlina Bayot as Socorro Soriano
- Kris Aquino as herself
- Suzette Ranillo as Jake
- Robby Mananquil as Perry
- Chinggoy Alonzo as Don Marcelo Madrigal
- Teresa Garcia
- Khalila Aguiluz
- Vangie Labalan
- Errol Dionisio† as Mang Domeng
- Efren Reyes Jr.
- Brandon Gepfer as Mando Leandro
- Niña de Sagun

== Soundtrack ==
1. Sana'y Wala Nang Wakas - performed by Jessa Zaragoza
2. Maybe - performed by King
3. Alam Kong Di Ako, Okey Lang - performed by Angelika Dela Cruz
4. Habang May Buhay - performed by Angelika Dela Cruz
5. Kailan Ka Darating? - performed by Angelika Dela Cruz
6. Bukas Na Lang Kita Mamahalin - performed by Angelika Dela Cruz
7. I Believe in You and Me - performed by Angelika Dela Cruz and Jericho Rosales
8. Looking Through the Eyes of Love - performed by Angelika Dela Cruz
9. Kung Ako Na Lang Sana - performed by Angelika Dela Cruz
10. Special Memory - performed by Kaye Abad
11. You've Made Me Stronger - performed by Kaye Abad
12. Stop Think - performed by Kaye Abad

== Production credits ==
- Directors: Jerome Chavez-Pobocan and FM Reyes
- Creative Manager: Ricardo Lee
- Head Writer: Henry King Quitain
- Episode Writers: Ma. Regina Amigo, Dindo Perez, Aileen Sempio-Viray, Francis Passion
- Contributing Writers: Denise O'Hara, Mel Francis Santos, Jarell Serencio
- Executive Producers: Des de Guzman, Charo Santos-Concio, and Malou Santos
- Supervising Producer: Anna Goma
- Assistant Director:

== Reception ==
Sana'y Wala Nang Wakas was considered as one of the best soap operas in the Philippine TV history by most of the critics and audiences. Its highest rating was 49.3%, while the lowest was 38.7%. Its overall ratings was 40.4%.

== Remake ==
A Malaysian remake of the series, titled Cinta Tiada Ganti premiered from July 10, 2018, to November 26, 2018, on Astro Prima and Astro Maya HD. Starring Aedy Ashraf and Nelydia Senrose.

== See also ==
- List of programs broadcast by ABS-CBN
- List of ABS-CBN Studios original drama series
