= Kristine Hermosa =

Filipino actress, model and entrepreneur (born 1983)

Kristine Hermosa Orille-Sotto
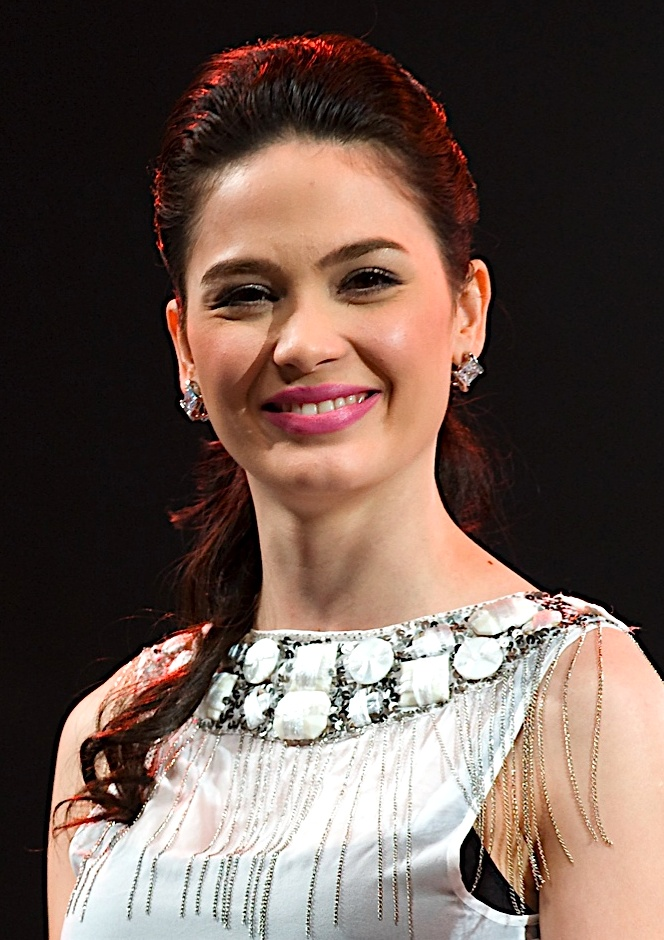
- Hermosa at a Star Magic concert in Ontario in June 2009
- Born: Kristine Hermosa Orille; September 9, 1983 (age 43); Masbate, Philippines
- Occupation: Actress
- Years active: 1996–present
- Agent: Star Magic (1996–2010)
- Known for: Pangako Sa 'Yo; Sana'y Wala Nang Wakas; Dahil May Isang Ikaw
- Spouses: Diether Ocampo (m. 2004; ann. 2009); Oyo Boy Sotto (m. 2011)
- Children: 6
- Family: Kathleen Hermosa (sister); Dina Bonnevie (mother-in-law); Vic Sotto (father-in-law); Vico Sotto (brother-in-law)

Kristine Hermosa Orille-Sotto (Tagalog: [kɾɪsˈtin heɾˈmɔsa ˈsɔtɔ]; born September 9, 1983) is a Filipino actress.

Hermosa made her screen debut in the youth-oriented variety show Ang TV (1995). Her breakthrough came in the soap opera Pangako Sa 'Yo (2000), which became one of the highest-rated television series in Philippine history. She went on to star in several teleseryes, including Sana'y Wala Nang Wakas (2003), 'Til Death Do Us Part (2005), Gulong ng Palad (2006), Prinsesa ng Banyera (2007), and Dahil May Isang Ikaw (2009). Her performance in Dahil May Isang Ikaw earned her a nomination at the International Emmy Awards and made her a finalist at the 2011 New York Festivals TV & Film Awards.

She was one half of the popular ABS-CBN love team "EchoTin" alongside Jericho Rosales. Hermosa has also been recognized as one of the network's successful actresses, known for her consistent box office appeal. One of her most notable works is the 2002 film Forevermore, which has been described as a significant romantic drama in Philippine cinema. In 2003, Ngayong Nandito Ka was released, earning ₱115 million at the box office. The following year, she starred alongside Aga Muhlach in All My Life, which grossed ₱175 million. That same year, she appeared with Vic Sotto (who would later become her father-in-law) in Enteng Kabisote: OK Ka Fairy Ko... The Legend (2004), the first installment of the highly successful Enteng Kabisote film series.

Hermosa reprised her role as Faye in four subsequent installments of the Enteng Kabisote film series, concluding in 2007. The second installment, Enteng Kabisote 2: Okay Ka Fairy Ko... The Legend Continues! (2005), was a commercial success, earning ₱158 million domestically and earning her the title of "Box-Office Queen" at the 2005 GMMSF Box Office Entertainment Awards. In 2010, she took an indefinite hiatus from acting to focus on her family with Oyo Sotto. She returned to television in 2016 with the sitcom Hay, Bahay! (2016) and rejoined ABS-CBN in 2018, portraying an antagonist in Bagani.

== Personal life ==
Hermosa was in an intimate relationship with her on-screen partner, Jericho Rosales, from 2000 to 2003.

On September 21, 2004, she married actor Diether Ocampo. Their marriage ended shortly after and was officially nullified on January 30, 2009.

Hermosa married actor and host Oyo Boy Sotto on January 12, 2011, at Club Balay Isabel in Talisay, Batangas, with fellow actors Charo Santos-Concio and Johnny Manahan as their special sponsors. Hermosa and Sotto have six children.

== Acting career ==
Hermosa was discovered at age 12 when her older sister Kathleen auditioned for a show in ABS-CBN. She was cast in the 1998 weekly drama series, Sa Sandaling Kailangan Mo Ako. In 2000, she was cast in the primetime soap opera, Pangako Sa ’Yo, alongside Jericho Rosales. She starred in the film Forevermore, released in 2002. In 2003–2004, she starred in Sana'y Wala Nang Wakas.

She also played the lead role in the short-lived drama 'Til Death Do Us Part in 2005. Hermosa appeared in Gulong ng Palad and Prinsesa ng Banyera in 2006 and 2007 respectively and in Dahil May Isang Ikaw in 2009.

Her last project on ABS-CBN was the action-fantasy series Noah where she played a diwata, the counterpart of a fairy in Philippine mythology.

In 2016, she starred in GMA's weekly sitcom Hay, Bahay! with her husband Oyo Boy Sotto, Vic Sotto and Ai-Ai delas Alas, her first major role as a Kapuso artist.

In 2018, she returned to teleseryes through a very special role in the adventure-fantasy drama Bagani, her comeback project on ABS-CBN.

== Filmography ==
=== Film ===
Year	Title	Role	Ref.
1998	Haba-baba-doo! Puti-puti-poo!	Tintin	
1998	Nagbibinata	Willie	
1999	Gimik: The Reunion	Suzette Pia	
1999	Oo Na... Mahal Na Kung Mahal	Chrissie	
2000	Minsan, Minahal Kita	Pia	
2000	Pera o Bayong (Not da TV)	Julie Ann	
2001	Hostage	Gina	
2001	Dugong Aso: Mabuting Kaibigan, Masamang Kaaway	Kristine	
2001	Trip	Celine	
2002	Forevermore	Marianne	
2003	Ngayong Nandito Ka	Garie Cruz	
2004	All My Life	Louie	
2004	Bcuz of U	Ria	
2004	Enteng Kabisote: Okay Ka, Fairy Ko: The Legend	Faye	
2005	Enteng Kabisote 2: Okay Ka, Fairy Ko: The Legend Continues	Faye	
2006	'Wag Kang Lilingon	Angel	
2006	Enteng Kabisote 3: Okay Ka, Fairy Ko: The Legend Goes On and On and On	Faye	
2007	Enteng Kabisote 4: Okay Ka, Fairy Ko... The Beginning of the Legend	Faye	
2008	My Big Love	Niña	
2017	Meant to Beh	young Andrea	

=== Television ===
Year	Title	Role	Ref.
1995	Ang TV	Herself	
1997–1998	Gimik	TinTin Fernandez	
1998	Sa Sandaling Kailangan Mo Ako	Agnes	
1998–2001	Richard Loves Lucy		
1999	Ang Munting Paraiso	Rowena	
1999	Wansapanataym Ang Sapatos ni Cinderella	Cinderella “Cindy”	
1999	Star Drama Theater Presents: Kristine	Various Roles in 4 Episodes	
2000	Pangako Sa 'Yo	Ynamorata 'Yna' Macaspac	
2001	StarStudio Presents: Cross Roads	with Rico Yan	
2003	Sana'y Wala Nang Wakas	Arabella Grace 'Ara' Garcia	
2005	'Til Death Do Us Part	Ysabel	
2006	Gulong ng Palad	Luisa Santos - Medel	
2006	Your Song: Sabihin Mo Na	Guest	
2006	Komiks: Bampy	Bampirella	
2006	Star Magic Presents: Windows To The Heart	Susan	
2006	Komiks: Bahay Ng Lagim	Guest	
2006	Your Song: Ilalim Ng Ulan	Guest	
2007	Love Spell: Click Na Click	Wena Eugenio	
2007	Sineserye Presents: Palimos Ng Pag-ibig	Ditas	
2007	Your Song: Himala	Guest	
2007	Prinsesa ng Banyera	Maningning Burgos	
2007	Your Song: Christmas Is	Guest	
2008	Maalaala Mo Kaya: Gayuma	Aida	
2009	Komiks: Nasaan Ka Maruja?	Maruja S. Martinez / Cristy Mondes Rivera	
2009	Dahil May Isang Ikaw	Angela 'Ella' Alferos	
2010	Precious Hearts Romances Presents: Lumang Piso Para sa Puso	Sandra Perez	
2010	Noah	Diwatang Eva	
2013	Vampire ang Daddy Ko	Irene Marcos	
2016–2017	Hay, Bahay!	Batch	
2017	Bossing & Ai	Guest	
2018	Bagani	Malaya	
2020, 2022	Daddy's Gurl	Ina / Herself Guest	

== Awards, recognitions and nominations ==
Year	Award, recognition, and nomination	Critics
2011	New York Festivals Awardee (Dahil May Isang Ikaw)	2011 New York Festivals
2010	Hall of Fame Hot 100 (10 yrs of inclusion in FHM 100 Sexiest List)	FHM Philippines
2006	Box-Office Queen	GMMSF Box-Office Entertainment Awards
2002	Most Popular Love Team with Jericho Rosales	GMMSF Box-Office Entertainment Awards
2001	Most Popular Love Team with Jericho Rosales for (Pangako Sa 'Yo)	GMMSF Box-Office Entertainment Awards
