= Alagwa (film) =

2012 Filipino drama horror film

- Official poster
- Directed by: Ian Loreños
- Screenplay by: Ian Loreños
- Produced by: Gloria Lao; Ian Loreños; Jericho Rosales
- Starring: Jericho Rosales; Bugoy Cariño
- Cinematography: Rommel Sales
- Edited by: Dempster Samarista
- Music by: Gab Valenciano
- Production company: Anakim Media Productions
- Distributed by: Star Cinema
- Release dates: October 6, 2012 (Busan Film Festival); October 9, 2013 (Philippines)
- Running time: 88 minutes
- Country: Philippines
- Languages: Filipino; Tagalog; English
- Box office: ₱1,896,577.00

Alagwa (English: Breakaway) is a 2012 Filipino drama horror film written and directed by Ian Loreños. The film stars Jericho Rosales, a father struggling to search his son after disappearing in the city. The film is inspired by a popular urban legend about a child's disappearance in Chinatown Manila. The film uncovers the dark facets of the underground business of human trafficking in the Philippines.

The film had its world premiere at the 17th Busan International Film Festival in 2012, and have its limited screening in the Philippines during the CinemaOne Originals Film Festival 2012, last December. The film was released commercially by Star Cinema this October 9, 2013.

== Synopsis ==
Robert Lim, an impoverished single parent, spends his free time with his young son Brian after the death of his wife during childbirth. While Robert makes a sales presentation during which one of his clients tries to make sexual advances at him, Brian nearly stabs his classmate's eye in a fight at school over his father's appearance. At home, Robert disciplines his son but tries to make up by going to the mall.

In the mall, Brian goes to the bathroom and then mysteriously disappears. Robert, worried about his son, informs the police chief that of Brian's abduction. Evidence from a surveillance camera disc shows a teenager talking to his son. Enraged, Robert goes to a park in search of the suspect and later witnesses him getting off a taxi. Robert chases after him but he escapes. The next day, the police recover the body of a boy. Robert first thinks it is his son but it turns out to be the body of his kidnapper.

Robert, becoming more furious, attempts to hunt down the man responsible for his son's disappearance. He encounters a vigilante who, with his knowledge about the suspects of Brian's kidnapping, tells him that Brian's kidnapping is the result of human-trafficking and that his son is now being transported to Hong Kong. That night, Robert receives a call from the vigilante, telling him to meet him under an overpass but they get ambushed by the police and the vigilante dies on the scene.

Several years later, Robert has a new family and with his new son he travels to Hong Kong. On the streets, his son suddenly goes missing and Robert goes to search for him, feeling worried that the previous incident would also happen to his new family. While searching in a subway, Robert finds a homeless man playing a harmonica. He recognises the homeless man's harmonica, realising that Brian had exactly the same harmonica from his childhood. Robert also remembers Brian teaching him a secret handshake and when he attempts the secret handshake with the homeless man he gets the same handshake in return. Realising that his long-lost son is finally found, Robert tearfully embraces him and the story concludes with his other son witnessing the scene.

== Cast ==
- Jericho Rosales as Robert Lim
- Bugoy Cariño as Bryan Lim
- John Manalo as the other son of Robert from his new family
- Leo Martinez
- Carmen Soo
- Smokey Manaloto

== Awards and nominations ==
- 2013 FAMAS Awards
  - Nominated-Best Actor – Jericho Rosales
  - Nominated-Best Child Actor – Bugoy Cariño
- 2013 Gawad Urian Awards
  - Winner-Best Actor – Jericho Rosales
  - Nominated-Best Director – Ian Loreños
  - Nominated-Best Editing – Dempster Samarista
  - Nominated-Best Screenplay – Ian Loreños
- 2013 Golden Screen Awards
  - Nominated-Best Film (Drama)
  - Nominated-Best Actor – Jericho Rosales
  - Nominated-Best Story – Ian Loreños
- 2013 Newport Beach Film Festival
  - Winner-Outstanding Achievement in Acting - Jericho Rosales
- ASEAN Film Festival
  - Winner-Best Supporting Actor - Bugoy Cariño
