= Jo Berry (actress) =

Filipina actress (born 1994)

- Born: Josephine Bibit Berry; February 9, 1994 (age 32); Manila, Philippines
- Occupation: Actress
- Years active: 2016–present
- Height: 3 ft 0 in (0.91 m)

Josephine "Jo" Bibit Berry (born February 9, 1994) is a Filipino actress with dwarfism.

== Early life ==
Berry was born on February 9, 1994 to parents Romilyn "Lynn" and Perry Berry Sr. and is the youngest of four children. Her father is Spanish-American, and the president of the Little People's Association of the Philippines (LPAP). Berry was born with dwarfism, as was her father and eldest brother. Her mother and other siblings do not have the condition.

According to Berry, her ambition was to become an attorney, but she took a course in computer science during her college years. She worked in an outsourcing company prior to becoming an actress.

== Career ==
Berry started her acting career in the drama anthology series Magpakailanman, where she played the role of Lorna Fernandez. She also appeared in the television drama series Onanay, as the lead role, Onay Matayog, a woman born with Achondroplasia.

== Filmography ==
=== Film ===
Film appearances of Jo Berry
Year	Title	Role	Notes	Source
2019	Kiko en Lala	Tadhana		

=== Television ===
Television appearances of Jo Berry
Year	Title	Role	Notes	Source
2016	Magpakailanman	Lorna Fernandez	Episode: "My Little Wife"	
2018	Pepito Manaloto	Jo Bartolome	Episode: "Isumbong mo kay Tommy"	
2018–2019	Onanay	Ronalyn "Onay" Matayog-Samonte		
2019	Dear Uge	Madam So Very		
2019	Daig Kayo ng Lola Ko	Elma Santelmo	Episode: "Lola Enchanted"	
2019	Daddy's Gurl	Tiny		
2019	Wish Ko Lang!	Michelle		
2019–2020	The Gift	Strawberry "Straw" Apostol Anzures		
2020	Daig Kayo ng Lola Ko	Lily	Episode: "Which is Witch"	
2021	My Fantastic Pag-ibig	Kabibabe	Episode: "Fairy Tale Romance"	
2022	Little Princess	Princess R. Montivano		
2022	Tadhana	Clarissa	Episode: "Two Mothers"	
2022	Magpakailanman	Jkhriez Pastrana	Episode: "Ang Dakilang Kong Ama"	
2022	Happy Together	Josie		
2022	The Best Ka!	Herself	Guest co-host	
2024–2025	Lilet Matias: Attorney-at-Law	Lilet Mercado-Matias / Lily Magbanua-Engano / Lilet Matias-Ignacio		
2024	Widows' War	Lilet Mercado-Matias		
2025	Mga Batang Riles	Lilet Matias-Ignacio		
2025	Akusada	Lilet Matias-Ignacio		
2026	Apoy sa Dugo	Lilet Matias-Ignacio		
2026	The Master Cutter	Ame		
2026	Magpakailanman	Herself	Episode: "Little Big Dreamer"	
2026	Wish Ko Lang		Episode: Bilanggo sa Maleta	

== Accolades ==
Accolades received by Jo Berry
Year	Work	Award	Category	Result	Source
2019	Onanay	33rd PMPC Star Awards for Television	Best New Female TV Personality	Nominated	
