= Jericho Rosales =

Filipino actor and singer (born 1979)

- Rosales in 2026
- Born: Jericho Vibar Rosales; September 22, 1979 (age 46); Quezon City, Philippines
- Other name: Echo
- Years active: 1996–present
- Agent(s): Star Magic Manila Genesis Cornerstone Entertainment
- Spouse: Kim Jones (m. 2014; sep. 2019)
- Children: Santino Rosales
- Website: jerichorosales.com

Jericho Vibar Rosales (Tagalog: [ˌd͡ʒɛː.ɾɪˈxo ɾoˈsaː.lɛs]; born September 22, 1979) is a Filipino actor, singer, songwriter and film producer. Known primarily for his leading man roles in romantic drama, he has starred in some of the most distributed Philippine series around the world. His accolades include a Guam International Film Festival Award, two Newport Beach Film Festival Award, a Gawad Urian, two Metro Manila Film Festival Awards and four Star Awards for Movies, including nominations for an ASEAN International Film Festival and Awards, six FAMAS Awards and four Luna Awards.

At age 17, Rosales began his career after winning the pageant "Mr. Pogi" in 1996, a segment in the noontime variety show Eat Bulaga!. He was launched the following year as one of Star Circle's fourth batch members by talent agency Star Magic. He rose to stardom after playing Angelo Buenavista in the romantic drama Pangako Sa 'Yo (2000), and has since starred in International Emmy-nominated series such as Kahit Isang Saglit (2008), Dahil May Isang Ikaw (2010), The Legal Wife (2014) and Bridges of Love (2016). His other starring roles in Sana'y Wala Nang Wakas (2003), Panday (2005), Green Rose (2011) and Halik (2018) established him as a leading actor in soap operas.

Dubbed as the "Asian Drama King", Rosales is one of the most successful Filipino actors in Asia. In 2012, he received an Achievement in Acting award at the Guam International Film Festival and won Best Actor at the Newport Beach Film Festival in 2013. He received his first Gawad Urian for Best Actor for his role in the film Alagwa (2012). For his portrayal in the romantic comedy Walang Forever (2015), he won the Metro Manila Film Festival Award for Best Actor. His portrayals in the biographical film Pacquiao: The Movie (2006) and romantic war drama Baler (2008) earned him the Star Award for Movie Actor of the Year.

== Career ==
=== 1996–2009: Early roles and breakthrough ===
Rosales gained international stardom in several countries (Malaysia, China, Ghana, Cambodia, Peru, Colombia, and many others) for his primetime soaps such as Pangako Sa 'Yo (2000–2002), Sana'y Wala Nang Wakas (2003–2004) and Dahil May Isang Ikaw (2009–2010), all co-starring Kristine Hermosa. Since its original release, Pangako Sa 'Yo has aired in over 20 foreign territories, with the Cambodian Television Network ordering a local remake in 2013. In Peru, Rosales is known for his role in the series Bridges of Love ("Puentes de Amor"), the first Filipino drama to air in the country and the Latin American market. Similarly, The Legal Wife (2014), which also stars Maja Salvador and Angel Locsin, have gained much popularity in the African and Balkan regions. In 2006 he portrayed Filipino boxing champion Manny Pacquiao in Pacquiao: The Movie, and bagged two Best Actor trophies for his work. He repeated this in 2008, when he won two more Best Actor awards for his role in the film Baler, opposite Anne Curtis.

=== 2010–2019: Career expansion ===
In February 2011, Rosales starred in the remake of the Korean drama, Green Rose. The same year, he appeared in two productions. He starred in his first international film, Subject: I Love You. He then starred in the family drama Yesterday, Today, Tomorrow which premiered at the 37th Metro Manila Film Festival. While it became the festival's least performing film at the box office with earnings of ₱10.6 million, his performance was met with critical praise. In March 2012, he starred with in the political drama Dahil sa Pag-ibig. The finale episode drew 33.9 percent national ratings. In 2013, Rosales starred as Jesse Robredo in the anthology Maalaala Mo Kaya. According to Kantar Media, the episode received 31.9 percent household ratings. In January 2014, he starred with Angel Locsin and Maja Salvador in the romantic drama The Legal Wife. His portrayal received praises from critics and was one of the most watched television shows of 2014. The following month, he starred in the adaptation of Bob Ong's fictional memoir ABNKKBSNPLAko?!. Abigail Mendoza of Philippine Entertainment Portal commended his "natural" approach to his character in the film. He later played a supporting role in the historical drama Bonifacio: Ang Unang Pangulo as Dr. Jose Rizal.

Rosales appeared in two major projects in 2015. He starred with Maja Salvador and Paulo Avelino in the romantic drama Bridges of Love. The series was a success, receiving a national rating of 28.3% at peak and earned a nomination at the International Emmy Award for Best Telenovela. In December 2015, Walang Forever premiered at the 41st Metro Manila Film Festival. The film was a box-office success, grossing ₱100 million throughout its run. In September 2016, Rosales starred with Arci Muñoz and John Estrada in the revenge drama Magpahanggang Wakas. The series received its highest national rating of 29% in one of its episodes. He then played a fictionalized version of himself in the comedy film Ang Babae Sa Septic Tank 2: #ForeverIsNotEnough. The following year, he played Diego in the romantic drama Siargao, directed by Paul Soriano. In August 2018, Rosales starred in the drama Halik. According to Kantar Media, the series achieved its highest national television rating of 30.3% in its finale episode and was ranked among the most watched television shows of 2018 in the Philippines. In December 2018, The Girl in the Orange Dress was released as one of the entries of the 44th Metro Manila Film Festival where he starred opposite Jessy Mendiola. In 2019, he starred in a short film by Eileen Cabiling called Basurero.

=== 2020–present: Established actor ===
After a four-year hiatus, Rosales made his acting comeback in May 2023 through his theatrical debut as Tony Javier in Ryan Cayabyab's Ang Larawan: The Concert. Recent highlights include his performance in the TV series Lavender Fields which aired in 2024, and the highly anticipated action series Sellblock, for which principal photography wrapped in April 2024. He also starred as Manuel L. Quezon in the 2025 biopic film Quezon. Rosales reunited with Anne Curtis as the duo worked together in their 2026 romantic film The Loved One, marking their second film together since their first film Baler, with both of their films produced by Viva Films.

== Reception ==
Rosales is often dubbed as the "Asian Drama King" by various sources. He is regarded as one of the most sought after leading men and has been cited as the greatest movie leading actor from 2000 to 2020 by PEP.ph. He has gained massive following and popularity in Asian and African countries for the widespread success of his soap operas. Writing for Esquire magazine, Paul John Caña stated that Rosales is "a superstar of the highest order, not just in the Philippines but in many other places around the world". In a 2018 review, Ferdinand Topacio of The Philippine Star stated that Rosales is a combination of Piolo Pascual, John Lloyd Cruz and Alden Richards. Oggs Cruz of Rappler stated that Rosales is mainly known for "playing characters whose struggles in either love or life are laced with all manners of desperation." A critic from The Hollywood Reporter also praised his portrayal in the horror drama Alagwa, stating that he conveyed his role expertly and emphasized his natural chemistry and spontaneity with co-actor Bugoy Cariño.

Rosales has earned international acclaim for his film work. He starred alongside Briana Evigan and Dean Cain in the film Subject: I Love You. It became the first Filipino film to be shown in a festival where over 400 American and international films are screened. His role in Alagwa (2012), earned him a Best Actor win at the Guam International Film Festival and a nomination at the ASEAN International Film Festival and Awards in the same category. He also won Best Actor twice at the Newport Beach Film Festival for his roles in Subject: I Love You (2011) and Alagwa (2012). His film Basurero (2010) had its world premiere at the Busan International Film Festival and later competed at the Tampere Film Festival. The film earned him a Best Actor nomination at the New Filmmaker Los Angeles Awards. He also starred in the Malaysian television series Kusinero Cinta with Aaron Aziz and Tiz Zaqyah and starred opposite Carmen Soo in the series Kahit Isang Saglit, which was aired in Malaysia and Singapore. In 2011, Yes! magazine ranked among the biggest celebrity endorsers in the Philippines. In 2023, Tatler magazine named him one of the most stylish personalities in Asia.

== Philanthropy and activism ==
In February 2014, Rosales was involved in a campaign "Free Mali", the lonely elephant who has been living in a small, concrete enclosure at the Manila Zoo for 35 years. The campaign is led by animal rights group PETA. In February 2020, Rosales launched an eco-friendly tote bags named "Echo Bags". Portions of the proceeds went to "Waves 4 Water", a non-profit organization which helps people around the world get access to clean water. In April 2020, Rosales auctioned some of his items in an online bidding for the benefit of "Lockdown Cinema Club", which supports 1,500 film workers displaced by the ongoing Luzon lockdown due to the COVID-19 pandemic. In November 2020, Rosales donated 400 food packs in Marikina for the victims of Typhoon Ulysses through the organization "I Am Hope" headed by Bea Alonzo. In October 2021, Rosales spearheaded a 20-unit housing project in Baggao, Cagayan, with ex-wife Kim Jones and manager Marinez Elizalde for the victims of Typhoon Ulysses.

== Personal life ==
Rosales was born in Quezon City, but was raised in Bula, Camarines Sur where he learned to speak Rinconada Bikol.

Santino Rosales (born 2000), his son with ex-partner Kai Palomares, is a model and professional football player for Maharlika Taguig.

Rosales and Kristine Hermosa were in a relationship from 2000 to 2004.

He married Kim Jones in a beach wedding ceremony in Boracay on May 1, 2014. On January 29, 2024, Rosales and Jones announced their separation after being married for 10 years. Their godfather, Ricco Ocampo, stated that they had been separated since 2019.

In August 2024, Rosales announced that he was dating actress Janine Gutierrez.

== Acting credits ==
=== Television ===
Key
†	Denotes shows that have not yet been aired

Jericho Rosales's television credits with year of release, title(s) and role
Year	Title	Role	Notes	Ref(s)
1997	Kaybol: Ang Bagong TV			
1997	Esperanza	Buboy		
1997	Wansapanataym		Episode: "Stopwatch"	
1997	Star Drama Theater Presents: Angelika		Episode: "Anyone You Love"	
1998	Wansapanataym		Episode: "Celeste"	
1998	!Oka Tokat	Jeremy		
1998	Richard Loves Lucy			
1999	Wansapanataym		Episode: "Si San Miguel at Si Lucifer"	
1999	Ang Munting Paraiso	Alberto Dionisio		
2000	Pangako sa 'Yo	Angelo Buenavista		
2003	Sana'y Wala Nang Wakas	Christian Soriano		
2003	Masayang Tanghali Bayan	Host		
2004	Maalaala Mo Kaya	Erik Santos		
2005	Bora: Sons of the Beach	Alon		
2005	Carlo J. Caparas' Ang Panday	Tristan		
2007	Love Spell Presents: Ellay Enchanted	Elloy		
2007	Pangarap na Bituin	Terrence Rodriguez		
2008	Maalaala Mo Kaya	Johnny	Episode: "Gayuma"	
2008	Kahit Isang Saglit	Francisco 'Rocky' Santillan Jr.		
2009	I Love Betty La Fea	Aldo		
2009	Dahil May Isang Ikaw	Miguel Ramirez		
2011	Green Rose	Jerome Delgado		
2011	I Dare You	Host		
2011	100 Days to Heaven	Tagabantay		
2012	Dahil sa Pag-Ibig	Oliver Falcon		
2013	Maalaala Mo Kaya	Jesse Robredo	Episode: "Tsinelas"	
2014	The Legal Wife	Adrian De Villa		
2014	Kusinero Cinta	Fredo		
2015	Bridges of Love	Gabriel "Gael" Nakpil		
2016	Magpahanggang Wakas	Ronualdo "Waldo" Del Mar		
2018	Halik	Catalino "Lino" Bartolome		
2024	Lavender Fields	Tyrone De Vera / Arthur Pelaez		
2026	The Loyalty Game	Benjamin "Ben" Santos		
TBA	The Accused †			
TBA	Sellblock †			

=== Film ===
Jericho Rosales's film credits with year of release, film titles and roles
Year	Title	Role	Notes	Ref(s)
1997	Biyudo si Daddy, Biyuda si Mommy	Robert		
1997	Hanggang Kailan Kita Mamahalin?	Jojo		
1998	Magandang Hatinggabi	Darwin		
1999	Wansapanataym: The Movie	Michael Arcangel		
1999	Suspek			
2000	Tanging Yaman	Rommel		
2001	Trip	Erwin		
2001	Bagong Buwan	Lieutenant Ricarte		
2002	Forevermore	Anton		
2002	Kailangan Kita	Abel		
2003	Ngayong Nandito Ka	Rocky		
2003	Noon at Ngayon	Levi		
2004	Santa Santita	Mike		
2005	Nasaan Ka Man	Joven		
2006	Pacquiao: The Movie	Manny Pacquiao		
2006	Bilut	Gabriel		
2008	Baler	Celso Resurrecion		
2010	I'll Be There	Tommy Santibañez		
2011	Subject: I Love You	Victor		
2011	Yesterday, Today, Tomorrow	Jacob		
2012	Alagwa	Robert Lim		
2014	ABNKKBSNPLAko? The Movie	Roberto		
2014	Bonifacio: Ang Unang Pangulo	José Rizal		
2015	#Walang Forever	Ethan Isaac		
2016	Ang Babae sa Septic Tank 2: Forever is Not Enough	Jericho Rosales (Fictionalized)		
2017	Luck at First Sight	Joma		
2017	Siargao	Diego		
2018	The Girl in the Orange Dress	Rye Del Rosario		
2025	Quezon	President Manuel L. Quezon	Also co-executive producer	
2026	The Loved One	Eric	Also executive producer	

== Awards and nominations ==
=== Major associations ===
Awards and nominations received by Jericho Rosales
Award (Note: Awards, festivals, honors and other miscellaneous organizations are listed in alphabetical order.)	Year (Note: Indicates the year of ceremony. Each year is linked to the article about the awards held that year, wherever possible.)	Category	Nominated work	Result	Ref.
Awit Awards	2013	Song of the Year	Paboritong Tag-ulan	Nominated	
ASEAN International Film Festival and Awards	2013	Best Actor	Alagwa	Nominated	
Box Office Entertainment Awards	2000	Prince of RP Movies	Himself	Won	
Box Office Entertainment Awards	2000	Most Popular Loveteam (with Kristine Hermosa)	Pangako Sa 'Yo	Won	
Box Office Entertainment Awards	2010	Promising Male Recording/Performer of the Year	Change	Won	
Box Office Entertainment Awards	2016	Film Actor of the Year	#WalangForever	Won	
Box Office Entertainment Awards	2017	TV Actor of the Year	Magpahanggang Wakas	Won	
FAMAS Awards	2001	Best Supporting Actor	Tanging Yaman	Nominated	
FAMAS Awards	2006	Best Actor	Nasaan Ka Man	Nominated	
FAMAS Awards	2007	Best Actor	Pacquiao: The Movie	Nominated	
FAMAS Awards	2009	Best Actor	Baler	Nominated	
FAMAS Awards	2012	Best Theme Song	In the Name of Love ("Naaalala Ka")	Nominated	
FAMAS Awards	2013	Best Actor	Alagwa	Nominated	
Gawad Genio Awards	2009	Best Actor	Baler	Won	
Gawad Pasado Awards	2007	Best Actor	Pacquiao: The Movie	Nominated	
Gawad Pasado Awards	2009	Best Actor	Baler	Won	
Gawad Pasado Awards	2025	PinakaPASADOng Aktor sa Telebisyon 2024	Lavender Fields	Won	
Gawad Tanglaw Awards	2013	Best Actor	Alagwa	Won	
Gawad Tanglaw Awards	2019	Best Actor (Drama series)	Halik	Won	
Gawad Urian Awards	2001	Best Supporting Actor	Tanging Yaman	Nominated	
Gawad Urian Awards	2004	Best Supporting Actor	Noon at Ngayon	Nominated	
Gawad Urian Awards	2013	Best Actor	Alagwa	Won	
Gawad Urian Awards	2015	Best Actor	Red	Nominated	
Gawad Urian Awards	2016	Best Actor	#WalangForever	Nominated	
Golden Screen Awards	2007	Best Performance by an Actor in a Leading Role (Drama)	Pacquiao: The Movie	Nominated	
Golden Screen Awards	2009	Best Performance by an Actor in a Leading Role (Drama)	Baler	Nominated	
Golden Screen Awards	2013	Best Performance by an Actor in a Leading Role (Drama)	Alagwa	Nominated	
Golden Screen Awards	2013	Outstanding Performance by an Actor in a Drama Series	Dahil sa Pag-ibig	Nominated	
Golden Screen Awards	2013	Outstanding Original Reality/Competition Program Host	I Dare You	Nominated	
Guam International Film Festival	2013	Achievement in Acting	Alagwa	Won	
Luna Awards	2005	Best Actor	Santa Santita	Nominated	
Luna Awards	2011	Best Actor	Baler	Nominated	
Luna Awards	2012	Best Supporting Actor	Yesterday, Today, Tomorrow	Nominated	
Luna Awards	2018	Best Actor	Siargao	Nominated	
Metro Manila Film Festival	2011	Best Actor	Yesterday, Today, Tomorrow	Nominated	
Metro Manila Film Festival	2015	Best Actor	#WalangForever	Won	
Metro Manila Film Festival	2017	Best Actor	Siargao	Nominated	
Metro Manila Film Festival	2018	Best Actor	The Girl in the Orange Dress	Nominated	
Metro Manila Film Festival	2018	Male Star of the Night	Himself	Won	
NewFilmmakers Los Angeles Awards	2022	Best Actor	Basurero	Nominated	
Newport Beach Film Festival	2011	Outstanding Achievement in Filmmaking Acting	Subject: I Love You	Won	
Newport Beach Film Festival	2013	Outstanding Achievement in Acting	Alagwa	Won	
Star Award for Movies	2007	Movie Actor of the Year	Pacquiao: The Movie	Won	
Star Award for Movies	2009	Movie Actor of the Year	Baler	Won	
Star Award for Movies	2010	Male Star of the Night	Himself	Won	
Star Award for Movies	2012	Movie Actor of the Year	Yesterday, Today, Tomorrow	Nominated	
Star Award for Movies	2013	Movie Actor of the Year	Alagwa	Nominated	
Star Award for Movies	2014	Dekada Award	Himself	Won	
Star Award for Movies	2016	Movie Actor of the Year	#WalangForever	Nominated	
Star Award for Movies	2018	Movie Actor of the Year	Siargao	Nominated	
Star Award for Music	2010	Song of the Year	Pusong Ligaw	Won	
Star Award for Music	2019	Male Pop Artist of the Year	Hardin	Nominated	
Star Award for Television	1998	Best New Male TV Personality	Himself	Won	
Star Award for Television	2000	Best Single Performance by an Actor	Maalaala Mo Kaya ("Pasa")	Won	
Star Award for Television	2012	Best Drama Actor	Dahil sa Pag-ibig	Won	
Star Award for Television	2019	Best Drama Actor	Halik	Won	
Young Critics Circle	2000	Best Performance	Tanging Yaman	Won	

=== Other accolades ===
Awards and nominations received by Jericho Rosales
Award	Year	Category	Nominated work	Result	Ref.
Alta Media Icon Awards	2019	Best Drama Actor for TV	Halik	Won	
Anak TV Awards	2017	Makabata Star	Himself	Won	
Anak TV Awards	2019	Makabata Star	Himself	Won	
EdukCircle Awards	2018	Most Influential Male Endorser of the Year	Himself	Won	
EdukCircle Awards	2019	Best Actor in a Television Series	Halik	Won	
Jeepney TV Fan Favorite Awards	2022	Favorite Love Triangle (Note: shared with Angel Locsin and Maja Salvador)	The Legal Wife	Won	
Kabantugan Awards	2019	Most Favorite TV Actor	Halik	Won	
Kabantugan Awards	2019	Most Favorite Movie Actor		Won	
People Asia Awards	2018	Men Who Matter	Himself	Won	
Star Magic Awards	2013	Icon Award	Himself	Won	

== Discography ==
=== Studio album ===
List of studio albums, with sales figures and certifications
Title	Album details	Sales	Certifications
Kristine/Jericho	Released: 2002; Label: Star Records	—N/a	—N/a
Loose Fit	Released: August 28, 2006; Label: EMI Philippines	—N/a	—N/a
Jericho Rosales	Released: 2008; Label: EMI Philippines	—N/a	—N/a
Change	Released: 2009; Label: Star Records	PHI: 20,000	PARI: Platinum
Korona	Released: 2012; Label: Star Records	—N/a	—N/a

== See also ==
- Cinema of the Philippines
- List of Filipino male actors
- Television in the Philippines
