= 2012 FAMAS Awards =

Annual Filipino film awards ceremony

60th FAMAS Awards
- Date: Thursday, September 24, 2012
- Site: Fiesta Pavilion, Manila Hotel

Highlights
- Best Picture: Manila Kingpin: The Asiong Salonga Story
- Most awards: Manila Kingpin: The Asiong Salonga Story (10)
- Most nominations: Ang Panday 2 (17)

The 60th Filipino Academy of Movie Arts and Sciences Awards Night was held on September 24, 2012, at Fiesta Pavilion in Manila Hotel. Angelo "Eloy" Padua, president of Manila Hotel, hosted the event. This edition of FAMAS Awards was produced by Angel Calzo and directed by Leonardo Q. Belen.

Manila Kingpin: The Asiong Salonga Story, produced by Leonard Villalon and Maylyn Villalon-Enriquez, is the recipient of this edition's FAMAS Award for Best Picture.

== Awards ==
=== Major awards ===
Winners are listed first and highlighted with boldface.

Best Picture	Best Director
**Manila Kingpin: The Asiong Salonga Story — Leonard Villalon**; A Mother's Story — Olivia de Jesus, John D. Lazatin, Kerwin Du; Ang Panday 2 — Marlon Bautista, Annette Gozon-Abrogar; In the Name of Love — Marizel Samson-Martinez; The Road — Annette Gozon-Abrogar; Segunda Mano — Charo Santos-Concio, Malou Santos, Dingdong Dantes, Kris Aquino, Edward Mangahas	**Tikoy Aguiluz — Manila Kingpin: The Asiong Salonga Story**; Yam Laranas — The Road; Ruel S. Bayani — No Other Woman; John D. Lazatin — A Mother's Story; Olivia M. Lamasan — In the Name of Love; Mac Alejandre — Ang Panday 2; Joyce Bernal — Segunda Mano
Best Actor	Best Actress
**Jeorge Estregan — Manila Kingpin: The Asiong Salonga Story**; Ramon 'Bong' Revilla Jr. — Ang Panday 2; Aga Muhlach — In the Name of Love; Nonie Buencamino — A Mother's Story; Derek Ramsay — No Other Woman; Dingdong Dantes — Segunda Mano; TJ Trinidad — The Road	**Anne Curtis — No Other Woman**; Marian Rivera — Ang Panday 2; Pokwang — A Mother's Story; Kris Aquino — Segunda Mano; Rhian Ramos — The Road; Carla Abellana — Manila Kingpin: The Asiong Salonga Story; Angel Locsin — In the Name of Love; Cristine Reyes — No Other Woman
Best Supporting Actor	Best Supporting Actress
**Baron Geisler — Manila Kingpin: The Asiong Salonga Story**; Rayver Cruz — A Mother's Story; Jake Cuenca — In the Name of Love; Phillip Salvador — Ang Panday 2; Tirso Cruz III — No Other Woman; Marvin Agustin — The Road; Jhong Hilario — Segunda Mano	**Angelica Panganiban — Segunda Mano**; Carmi Martin — In the Name of Love; Daria Ramirez — A Mother's Story; Iza Calzado — Ang Panday 2; Carmi Martin — No Other Woman; Valerie Concepcion — Manila Kingpin: The Asiong Salonga Story; Carmina Villarroel — The Road
Best Child Actor	Best Child Actress
**Robert Villar — Ang Panday 2**; Renz Valerio — The Road	**Xyriel Manabat — A Mother's Story**; Sofia Millares — Segunda Mano
Best Screenplay	Best Cinematography
**Roy Iglesias, Rey Ventura — Manila Kingpin: The Asiong Salonga Story**; Olivia M. Lamasan, Enrico Santos — In the Name of Love; Yam Laranas, Aloy Adlawan — The Road; Senedy Que — A Mother's Story; R.J. Nuevas — Ang Panday 2; Joel Mercado — Segunda Mano; Ricardo Fernando III, Kriz G. Gazmen — No Other Woman	**Carlo Mendoza — Manila Kingpin: The Asiong Salonga Story**; Daniel Uy — Ang Panday 2; Yam Laranas — The Road; Charlie Peralta — No Other Woman; Shayne Sarte — A Mother's Story; Hermann Claravall — In the Name of Love; Charlie Peralta — Segunda Mano
Best Art Direction	Best Sound
**Elmer Gamila, Ritchie Besas — Ang Panday 2**; Melchor Defensor — The Road; Shari Marie Terese E. Montiague — In the Name of Love; Nesty Ramirez — A Mother's Story; Nancy Arcega — No Other Woman; Nancy Arcega — Segunda Mano	**Ariel Serafin, Ditoy Aguila, Warren Santiago, Lucy Quinto — Ang Panday 2**; Marlon Ongleo, Aenid Pajo — A Mother's Story; Aurel Claro Bilbao — No Other Woman; Alex Tomboc, Lamberto Casas Jr., Addiss Tabong — The Road; Aurel Claro Bilbao — Segunda Mano; Aurel Claro Bilbao — In the Name of Love
Best Editing	Best Special Effects
**Jason Cahapay, Ryan Orduña, Mirana Medina-Bhunjun — Manila Kingpin: The Asiong Salonga Story**; Mae Carzon, Yam Laranas — The Road; Vito Cajili — No Other Woman; Marya Ignacio — In the Name of Love; Joyce Bernal, Marya Ignacio — Segunda Mano; Mitos R. Briones — A Mother's Story; Chrisel Galeno-Desuasido — Ang Panday 2	**Charles Albert Alabado, Raymund Almaran — Ang Panday 2**; Erick Torrente — Manila Kingpin: The Asiong Salonga Story; Erick Torrente — Segunda Mano; Jessie Abiva, Carlo Abello, Ryan Abugan — The Road; Erick Torrente — In the Name of Love
Best Visual Effects	Best Story
**Serjohn Bato, Kuckoy dela Cruz, Veder Bato — Ang Panday 2**; Earl Bontuyan, Liza Ledesma, Dodge Ledesma — Segunda Mano; Nathaniel Robite, Joseph Ramos, Ryan Jose Ticsay — The Road; Fiona Marie Borres — In the Name of Love; Rommel Pambid, Matt Queblatin, Richard Francia — A Mother's Story; Arturo Jarlego — No Other Woman; Erick Torrente — Manila Kingpin: The Asiong Salonga Story	**Carlo J. Caparas, R.J. Nuevas — Ang Panday 2**; Kriz G. Gazmen, Ricardo Fernando III, Keiko Aquino — No Other Woman; Enrico Santos — In the Name of Love; Roy Iglesias, Rey Ventura — Manila Kingpin: The Asiong Salonga Story; Joel Mercado — Segunda Mano; Senedy Que — A Mother's Story; Yam Laranas — The Road
Best Theme Song	Best Musical Score
**"Hari ng Tondo" — Manila Kingpin: The Asiong Salonga Story (Gloc 9 ft. Denise)**; "Sakaling Malimutan Ka" — A Mother's Story (Carol Banawa); "Naaalala Ka" — In the Name of Love (Jericho Rosales); "Panday" — Ang Panday 2 (Pupil); "Now That You're Gone" — No Other Woman (Juris Fernandez)	**Jessie Lasaten — Manila Kingpin: The Asiong Salonga Story**; Raul Mitra — No Other Woman; Fred Ferraz — A Mother's Story; Von de Guzman — Ang Panday 2; Von de Guzman — In the Name of Love; Johan Söderqvist — The Road; Carmina Cuya — Segunda Mano

=== Special awards ===
**German Moreno Youth Achievement Award**

- Kristofer Martin
- Daniel Padilla
- Enrique Gil
- Derrick Monasterio
- Julie Anne San Jose
- Jessy Mendiola
- Edgar Allan Guzman

**Exemplary Achievement Award**

- Persida V. Rueda-Acosta (In the field of justice)

**FAMAS Hall of Fame**

- Carlo J. Caparas

**Huwarang Artista sa Larangan ng Serbisyo Publiko**

- Alfred Vargas

**Outstanding Lady Movie Producer**

- Malou Santos
- Lily Y. Monteverde
- Annette Gozon-Abrogar
- Donna Villa

**Public Service Award**

- Jorge Estregan

**Arturo M. Padua Memorial Award**

- Ricky Lo

**Posthumous Award**

- Jesse Robredo
