= Working Girls (2010 film) =

2010 Filipino comedy film

- Theatrical release poster
- Directed by: Jose Javier Reyes
- Written by: Jose Javier Reyes; Amado Lacuesta
- Story by: Jose Javier Reyes; Tony Gloria
- Produced by: Jose Mari Abacan; Vincent Del Rosario; Veronique Del Rosario; Tony Gloria
- Starring: Eugene Domingo; Ruffa Gutierrez; Iza Calzado; Jennylyn Mercado; Cristine Reyes; Eula Valdez; Bianca King
- Cinematography: Rodolfo Y. Aves Jr.
- Edited by: Claire Villareal
- Music by: Jesse Lucas
- Production companies: Viva Films; GMA Pictures; Unitel Pictures
- Distributed by: Viva Films
- Release date: April 21, 2010
- Running time: 110 minutes
- Country: Philippines
- Language: Filipino
- Box office: ₱33.2 million

Working Girls is a 2010 Filipino comedy film directed by Jose Javier Reyes. It is a sequel to the 1984 film of the same name. The film stars Eugene Domingo, Jennylyn Mercado, Iza Calzado, Cristine Reyes, Bianca King, Eula Valdez and Ruffa Gutierrez.

== Plot ==
In a world where men dominate business and women excel in the office, this movie follows the lives of everyday women as they navigate their challenges.

Paula reigns as the queen of fake designer bags. Her high earnings support her children’s education in a private school, compensating for her irresponsible, unemployed husband.

Ada, a single mother, juggles her job as a call center agent by night and her studies by day, striving to provide for her young son. However, her dedication strains her relationship with her mother, Sabel. Her close friend, Tobz, faces his own troubles with his girlfriend Wendy, a busy aspiring actress who neglects him. Her path crosses with Rodney, an attorney for celebrity plastic surgeon Dr. Cleo Carillo.

Marilou, a beauty queen turned CEO after her husband's death, grapples with conflicts involving her stepdaughter Amanda and her own daughter, Dara. A Berkeley graduate, Dara strives to prove herself in a television job while managing pressures from home and her boss, Suzanne. Meanwhile, Theresa, a nurse for Dr. Carillo's husband, finds contentment in her job but struggles with a broken heart.

In the end, Paula chooses to embrace her role as a loud-mouthed, responsible wife after a brief affair with her temporary driver. Ada realizes her love for Tobz, while Wendy is left heartbroken when Rodney departs.

Dara showcases her talent by uncovering the truth about activist Dolorosa "Rose" Bonefacio, and Marilou discovers Amanda's schemes against the company. Finally, Theresa finds closure by forgiving her ex-suitor.

This story captures the everyday struggles of women in love, family, finances, and community, serving as a sequel to Ishmael Bernal's blockbuster comedy from the '80s, originally produced by Viva Films.

== Cast ==
=== Main cast ===
- Eugene Domingo as Paula Cajanding
- Ruffa Gutierrez as Marilou Cobarrubias
- Iza Calzado as Theresa "Tere" Villanueva
- Jennylyn Mercado as Ada Rosales
- Cristine Reyes as Wendy Casuga
- Bianca King as Dara Dela Vega
- Eula Valdez as Dra. Cleo Carillo

=== Supporting cast ===
- Gina Pareño as Nimfa Cajanding
- Maria Isabel Lopez as Dolorosa "Rose" Bonifacio
- Mylene Dizon as Connie Valderamma
- Carmi Martin as Suzanne Galang Cavendish
- Rio Locsin as Sabel Rosales
- Jef Gaitan as Sara
- Katya Santos as Amy
- Ricky Davao as Nelson Obleta
- Rafael Rosell as Atty. Rodney Camacho
- Jao Mapa as Leon Arnaldo
- Carlo Aquino as Tobs
- Kirby De Jesus as Jaime Dela Vega
- Antonio Aquitania as Bobby Cajanding
- Andrea del Rosario as Rachel
- Joey Paras
- Matthew Mendoza
- Ina Feleo as Raissa Arnaldo
- Empress Schuck as Sylvia
- Cherie Gil as Amanda Dela Vega
- Manuel Chua as Albert Cetascoso
- Antonette Garcia as Lita
- LJ Moreno as Dra. Maya Fernandez
- Jake Cuenca as Jason

=== Guest cast ===
- Liza Lorena as Ynes
- Jackie Lou Blanco as Maura Abesamis
- Dante Rivero as Ronald Casuga

== See also ==
- GMA Films
- VIVA Films
- Philippine films of the 2000s
