= Kahit Kailan =

Philippine television drama series

- Title card
- Also known as: Always
- Genre: Romantic drama
- Created by: Don Michael Perez
- Directed by: Ruel S. Bayani
- Starring: Jolina Magdangal
- Theme music composer: Jay Durias
- Opening theme: "Kahit Kailan" by Jolina Magdangal
- Country of origin: Philippines
- Original language: Tagalog
- No. of episodes: 62

Production
- Executive producer: Wilma Galvante
- Camera setup: Multiple-camera setup
- Running time: 90 minutes
- Production company: GMA Entertainment TV

Original release
- Network: GMA Network
- Release: May 5, 2002 – July 6, 2003

Kahit Kailan (transl. anytime / international title: Always) is a Philippine television drama romance series broadcast by GMA Network. Directed by Ruel S. Bayani, it stars Jolina Magdangal. It premiered on May 5, 2002. The series concluded on July 6, 2003, with a total of 62 episodes.

== Cast and characters ==
Cast

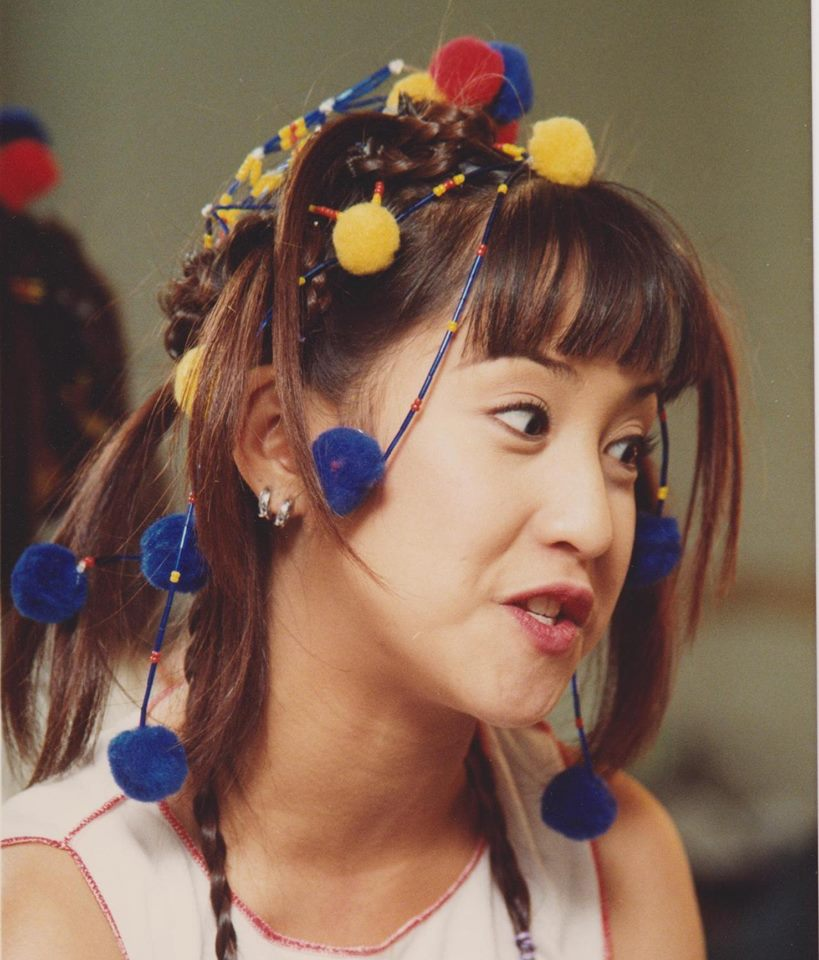
Jolina Magdangal

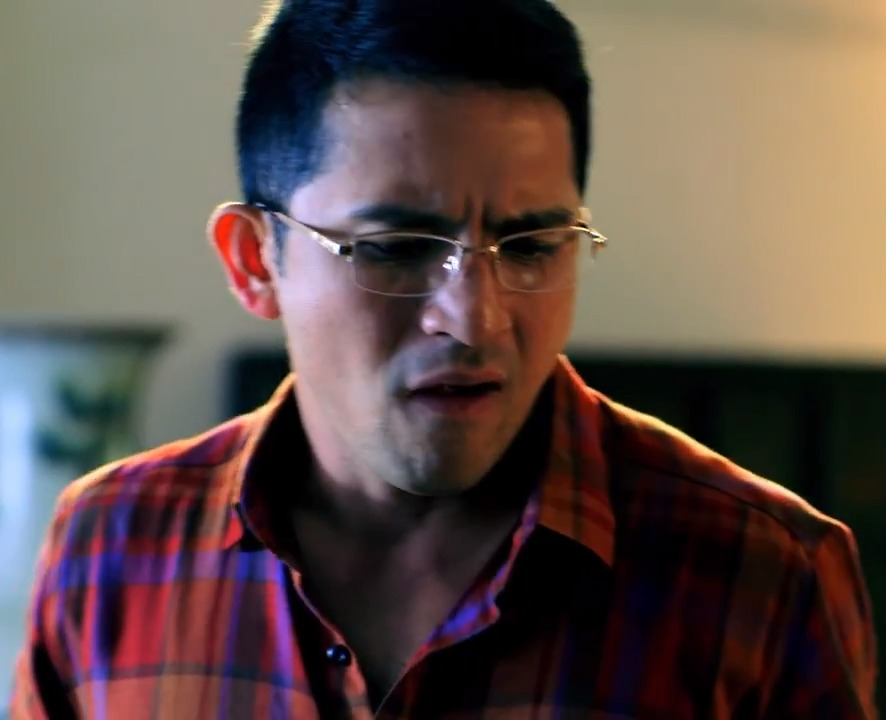
Dennis Trillo

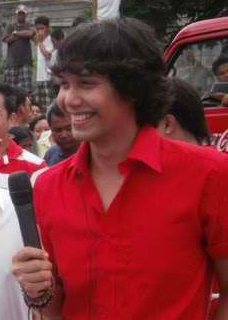
Paolo Ballesteros

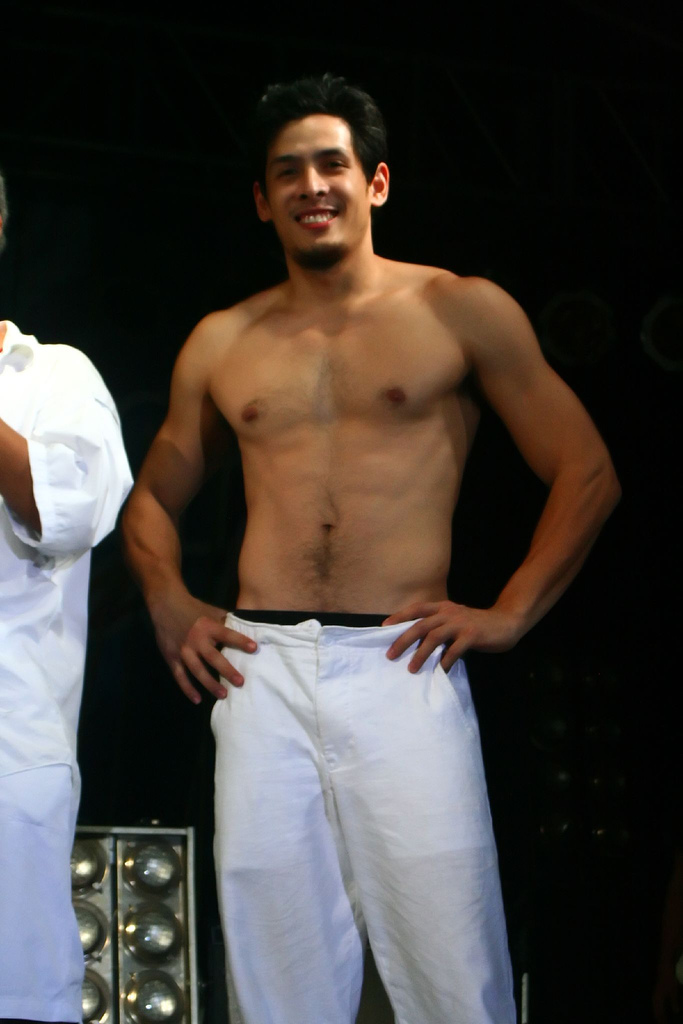
Christian Vasquez

Lead cast

- Jolina Magdangal as Frankie

Supporting cast

- James Blanco as Victor
- Danica Sotto as Alex
- Dennis Trillo as Jaime
- Roxanne Barcelo as Eden
- Biboy Ramirez as Luis
- Sunshine Dizon as Bettina a.k.a. Betchay
- Nancy Castiglione as Abby
- Maybelyn Dela Cruz as Rosette
- Paolo Ballesteros as PJ
- Miko Sotto as Itos
- Ina Feleo as Lira
- Mike Olivarez as Ricky
- Christian Vasquez as Carlo
- Greg Turvey as Russel
- Jeff Geronimo as Ray

Guest cast

- Gina Pareño as Candida Sanpiandante
- Rita Avila as Dolores
- Amy Austria
- Odette Khan
- Maritoni Fernandez as Lusing
- Carmi Martin as Dolce Vita
- Tootsie Guevara as Rafaella
- Roy Alvarez
- Jan Marini Alano as Tuding
- Gerard Pizaras
- Iya Villania as Marjorie
- Brad Turvey
- Migui Moreno
- Teri Onor
- Charlie Davao
- Allan Paule as Daniel
- Czarina de Leon
- Geoff Eigenmann
- Daniel Fernando
- Ricardo Cepeda
