= My Cheating Heart =

- Title card
- Also known as: Precious Hearts Romances Presents: My Cheating Heart
- Genre: Drama, romance, comedy
- Created by: ABS-CBN Studios; Martha Cecilia
- Directed by: Rory B. Quintos
- Starring: Jake Cuenca; Cristine Reyes; Bangs Garcia; Tom Rodriguez
- Opening theme: "Way Back Into Love" by Sam Milby and Toni Gonzaga
- Country of origin: Philippines
- Original languages: Filipino; English
- No. of episodes: 40

Production
- Executive producers: Carlo Katigbak; Cory Vidanes; Laurenti Dyogi
- Running time: 30-45 minutes
- Production company: Star Creatives Group

Original release
- Network: ABS-CBN
- Release: December 7, 2009 – January 29, 2010

My Cheating Heart is a Philippine television drama series broadcast by ABS-CBN. The series is the fourth installment of Precious Hearts Romances Presents. Directed by Rory B. Quintos, it stars Jake Cuenca, Cristine Reyes, Bangs Garcia and Tom Rodriguez. It aired on the network's Hapontastic line up and worldwide on TFC from December 7, 2009 to January 29, 2010, replacing Precious Hearts Romances Presents: Somewhere in My Heart and was replaced by Precious Hearts Romances Presents: Love Is Only in the Movies.

The series is currently available online on iWant and streaming on Jeepney TV's YouTube channel.

== Plot ==
Mio is Nadine's first crush and first love. Nadine is sure that Mio will be the only man she will ever love. They are childhood sweethearts until Arlyn arrives in their lives. Mio's attention towards Nadine suffers because of Arlyn, who does things to get Mio's attention and makes Nadine look bad.

Nadine is shocked to learn that Mio and Arlyn are a couple, and chooses to leave for America. After Arlyn and Mio's wedding plans fall apart, Nadine returns to the Philippines and tries her best to cheer Mio up. They grow closer, but Nadine's ex-boyfriend Harry arrives to take her back. Mio becomes jealous of Nadine's closeness with Harry. Nadine and Mio grow closer to what they used to be, but just as he is about to confess his feelings for Nadine Arlyn asks Mio for forgiveness. The reason she did not continue with the wedding was because she was dying and did not want Mio to suffer.

A few weeks later Nadine has decided to fight for Mio. One night when the two are at a friend's engagement party, Nadine plans to get Mio drunk and sleepy so she can get him home and pretend something has happened between them. The plan succeeds and Mio is held responsible for what he allegedly did to Nadine. Nadine, her mother and Mio's mother convince Mio to marry Nadine so he can be held responsible for his so-called "one night stand".

Nadine pretends to be pregnant, but Mio discovers it is a hoax, and with Arlyn's support he files for an annulment, leaving Nadine depressed. Mio's mother meets with Arlyn, making Nadine think that Mio's mother favours her. After learning that Arlyn and her boss were having an affair, Mio realizes that he truly loves Nadine but does not notice it. Before Nadine can leave for America, Mio and his friends and family pretend to kidnap Nadine. When she wakes up the next day she finds Mio next to her. He proposes to her, and after she accepts Mio and Nadine's families and friends invade their room to celebrate. Mio and Nadine begin a happy marriage.

== Cast and characters ==
=== Main cast ===
- Jake Cuenca as Emilio "Mio" Santa Romana, Nadine's childhood friend and best friend.
- Cristine Reyes as Nadine Zapanta, she helps Mio get back on his feet and secretly wants Mio to fall for her.
- Bangs Garcia as Arlyn Peralta
- Tom Rodriguez as Harry

=== Supporting cast ===
- Beatriz Saw as Pia
- Janus del Prado as Crisanto
- Bart Guingona as Arnel
- Irma Adlawan as Zeny
- Diana Malahay as Carina
- Idda Yaneza as Yaya Rosalie

=== Guest cast ===
- Mika dela Cruz as Young Nadine
- Paul Salas as Young Mio
- KC Aboloc as Young Arlene
- Jairus Aquino as Young Harry

== See also ==
- List of programs broadcast by ABS-CBN
- List of programs broadcast by Jeepney TV
