= No Other Woman =

- Theatrical movie poster
- Directed by: Ruel S. Bayani
- Screenplay by: Kriz G. Gazmen; Jay Fernando
- Story by: Keiko A. Aquino; Jay Fernando; Kriz G. Gazmen
- Produced by: Charo Santos-Concio; Malou N. Santos; Vic R. Del Rosario Jr; Vincent del Rosario III; Veronique del Rosario-Corpus
- Starring: Anne Curtis; Derek Ramsay; Cristine Reyes
- Cinematography: Charlie S. Peralta
- Edited by: Vito Cajili
- Music by: Raul Mitra
- Production companies: Star Cinema; Viva Films
- Distributed by: Star Cinema; Viva Films
- Release date: September 28, 2011
- Running time: 102 minutes
- Country: Philippines
- Languages: Filipino; English
- Box office: ₱278,418,883.00 (US$5.5 million)

No Other Woman is a 2011 Filipino romantic drama thriller film directed by Ruel S. Bayani and starring Anne Curtis, Derek Ramsay, and Cristine Reyes.

The film is notable for breaking box office records in the Philippines. It was the third highest grossing Filipino film of all time of 2011 having grossed P278 million; it was also the highest-grossing Filipino film until it was dethroned by the 2012 Metro Manila Film Fest entry Sisterakas. The film was also screened in select cities internationally.

This was Curtis' fourth movie after Wag Kang Lilingon (2006), Ang Cute ng Ina Mo! (2007), When Love Begins (2008) and Babe, I Love You (2010).

== Plot ==
Furniture supplier Ram (Derek Ramsay) is happily married to Charmaine (Cristine Reyes). One day, he lands a big client, a new luxury resort, but needs the help of Kara (Anne Curtis), the daughter of the resort's owner, to finalize the deal. Kara's help comes with a price because she wants Ram to be her lover. Before long, Kara seduces Ram though she knows he is married. When Charmaine learns of the affair, she seeks to win back her husband's waning attention.

== Cast and characters ==
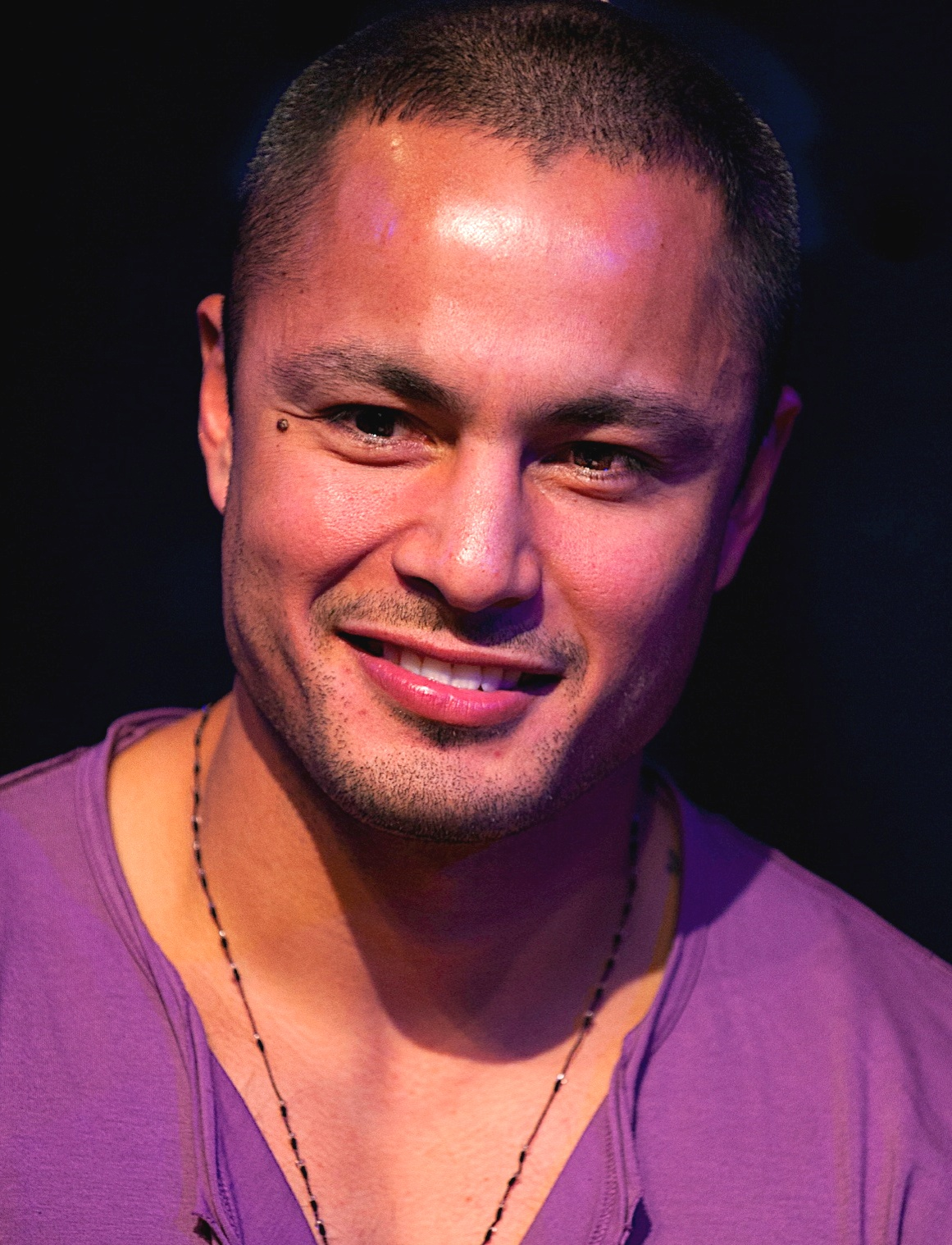
Derek Ramsay, portrays, Ram Escaler

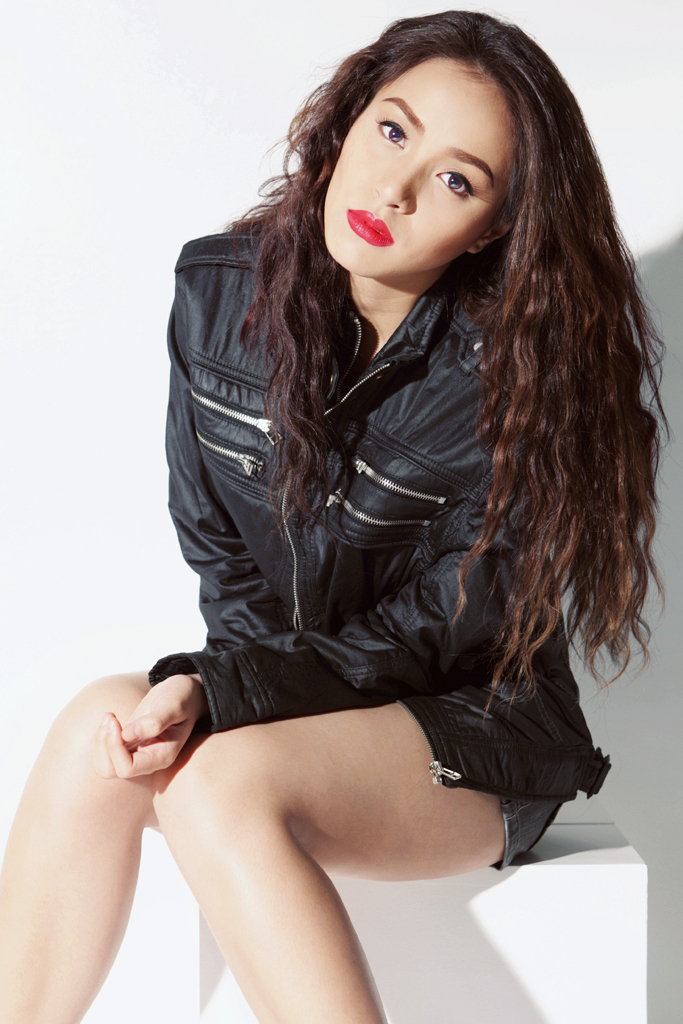
Cristine Reyes portrays Charmaine Dela Costa-Escaler.

- Anne Curtis as Kara Zalderiaga
- Derek Ramsay as Ram Escaler
- Cristine Reyes as Charmaine Dela Costa-Escaler
- Tirso Cruz III as Fernando Zalderiaga
- Carmi Martin as Babygirl Dela Costa
- John Arcilla as Mario Dela Costa
- Marlann Flores as Violet Dela Costa
- Johnny Revilla as Jaime Escaler
- Matt Evans as Jake Escaler
- Melvin Lee as Ito Dela Cruz
- Niña Dolino as Marian
- Ricci Chan as Raymond
- Ron Morales as Victor
- Kitkat as Mimi
- Kat Alano as Michelle
- Peter Serrano as Sales Team Staff
- Fred Payawan as Sales Team Staff

== Release ==
No Other Woman's grand premiere was supposed to be held on September 27, 2011, one day before the release date. However, it was cancelled because of Typhoon Pedring, which affected parts of Luzon. This cancellation was announced by Anne Curtis in her show Showtime on the morning of the supposed premiere date.

No Other Woman was released nationwide on September 28, 2011. It was also screened in selected cities around the world, including Chicago, Las Vegas, and Los Angeles.

The film was given an R-13 rating by the Movie and Television Review and Classification Board.

In March of 2019, the film was available on Netflix USA streaming.

=== Box office ===
Despite Typhoon Pedring affecting Luzon in the Philippines, the film opened with a P15 million gross on its first day. The movie earned P100 million in its first five days. In two weeks of showing, it has been declared as the highest grossing Filipino film of all time with an approximate P278 Million gross income, breaking the box office record set by the 2009 film, You Changed My Life, which grossed P225 million.

Due to the movie's good performance at the box office, its cast and crew received monetary rewards from the production studios.

On October 26, 2011, the box office records set by No Other Woman was surpassed by The Unkabogable Praybeyt Benjamin, another movie produced by Star Cinema and Viva Films. The Unkabogable Praybeyt Benjamin opened with a P200 million gross on its first week. and has a current gross of P331.6 million.

No Other Woman currently holds the record as the eighth highest-grossing Filipino film of all time.

== Critical reception ==
Though regarded as one of the memorable romance-drama movies for Filipinos, the film received mixed reviews from local film critics. Critics criticized the weak ending of the story line which is strong especially at the middle part but praised the film for memorable one-liners and the values in the movie.

No Other Woman was graded "A" by the Cinema Evaluation Board of the Philippines.

The film received mixed reviews from local film critics. Aaron Lozada of Philippine Star praised the film's casting, direction, and scoring. Abby Mendoza of PEP.ph praised the movie for handling a sensitive matter fairly. Philbert Dy of ClickTheCity.com criticized the movie for its uneven story, adding that the ending is "truly ugly." Jessica Zafra of Interaksyon.com commented that the characters are stereotypical.

== Accolades ==
=== Awards and nominations ===
| Year | Award-Giving Body | Category | Work | Result |
|---|---|---|---|---|
| 2012 | 28th PMPC Star Awards for Movies | Movie of the Year | No Other Woman | Nominated |
| 2012 | 28th PMPC Star Awards for Movies | Movie Actress of the Year (Best Actress) for (Anne Curtis) | No Other Woman | Nominated |
| 2012 | 28th PMPC Star Awards for Movies | Movie Actor of the Year (Best Actor) for (Derek Ramsay) | No Other Woman | Nominated |
| 2012 | 28th PMPC Star Awards for Movies | Best Original Screenplay of the Year (Kriz Gazmen and Jay Fernando) | No Other Woman | Nominated |
| 2012 | 28th PMPC Star Awards for Movies | Movie Cinematographer of the Year (Charlie Peralta) | No Other Woman | Nominated |
| 2012 | 28th PMPC Star Awards for Movies | Movie Editor of the Year (Vito Cajili) | No Other Woman | Nominated |
| 2012 | 28th PMPC Star Awards for Movies | Movie Musical Scorer of the Year (Raul Mitra) | No Other Woman | Nominated |
| 2012 | 28th PMPC Star Awards for Movies | Movie Sound Engineer of the Year (Ditoy Aguilar) | No Other Woman | Nominated |
| 2012 | 14th Gawad PASADO Awards | PinakaPASADOng Aktres (Anne Curtis) | No Other Woman | Won |
| 2012 | 14th Gawad PASADO Awards | PinakaPASADOng Dulang Pampelikula (Kriz Gazmen and Jay Fernando) | No Other Woman | Won |
| 2012 | GMMSF Box-Office Entertainment Awards | Box-Office King | Derek Ramsay | Won |
| 2012 | GMMSF Box-Office Entertainment Awards | Box-Office Queens | Anne Curtis and Cristine Reyes | Won |
| 2012 | 60th FAMAS Awards | Best Direction for (Ruel S. Bayani) | No Other Woman | Nominated |
| 2012 | 60th FAMAS Awards | Best Actress for (Anne Curtis) | No Other Woman | Won |
| 2012 | 60th FAMAS Awards | Best Actress for (Cristine Reyes) | No Other Woman | Nominated |
| 2012 | 60th FAMAS Awards | Best Actor for (Derek Ramsay) | No Other Woman | Nominated |
| 2012 | 60th FAMAS Awards | Best Supporting Actor for (Tirso Cruz III) | No Other Woman | Nominated |
| 2012 | 60th FAMAS Awards | Best Supporting Actor for (Carmi Martin) | No Other Woman | Nominated |
| 2012 | 60th FAMAS Awards | Best Screenplay (Kriz Gazmen and Jay Fernando) | No Other Woman | Nominated |
| 2012 | 60th FAMAS Awards | Best Cinematography (Charlie Peralta) | No Other Woman | Nominated |
| 2012 | 30th Luna Awards | Best Picture | No Other Woman | Nominated |
| 2012 | 30th Luna Awards | Best Direction (Ruel S. Bayani) | No Other Woman | Nominated |
| 2012 | 30th Luna Awards | Best Actor for (Derek Ramsay) | No Other Woman | Nominated |
| 2012 | 30th Luna Awards | Best Screenplay (Kriz Gazmen and Jay Fernando) | No Other Woman | Nominated |
| 2012 | 30th Luna Awards | Best Cinematography (Charlie Peralta) | No Other Woman | Nominated |
| 2012 | 30th Luna Awards | Beat Editing (Vito Cajili) | No Other Woman | Nominated |
| 2012 | 30th Luna Awards | Best Musical Score (Raul Mitra) | No Other Woman | Won |
