= When the Love Is Gone =

- Theatrical film poster
- Directed by: Andoy Ranay
- Screenplay by: Keiko Aquino
- Based on: Nagalit ang Buwan sa Haba ng Gabi (1983) by Danny Zialcita
- Produced by: Vic Del Rosario Jr.; Raam Punjabi
- Starring: Cristine Reyes; Jake Cuenca; Andi Eigenmann; Gabby Concepcion; Alice Dixson
- Cinematography: Pao Orendain
- Edited by: Marya Ignacio
- Music by: Geraldine Therese "GT" Lim
- Production companies: Viva Films; MVP Pictures
- Distributed by: Viva Films
- Release date: November 27, 2013
- Running time: 110 minutes
- Country: Philippines
- Languages: Filipino; English
- Box office: ₱37,412,869.00

When the Love Is Gone is a 2013 Filipino romantic drama film directed by Andoy Ranay and starring Cristine Reyes, Gabby Concepcion, Alice Dixson, Andi Eigenmann, and Jake Cuenca. The film is distributed by Viva Films with co-production of MVP Pictures and was released November 27, 2013, nationwide as part of Viva Films' 32nd anniversary.

The film is a remake of the 1983 blockbuster film Nagalit ang Buwan sa Haba ng Gabi by Danny Zialcita which stars Laurice Guillen, Gloria Diaz, Dindo Fernando, Janice de Belen, and Eddie Garcia.

== Synopsis ==
Emmanuel and Audrey were once a happy married couple until the pressures of demanding careers and mutual emotional neglect prompted them to seek intimacy and affection somewhere else. The couple engaged in an extra-marital affairs which took a heavy toll on all of them.

== Cast ==
=== Main cast ===
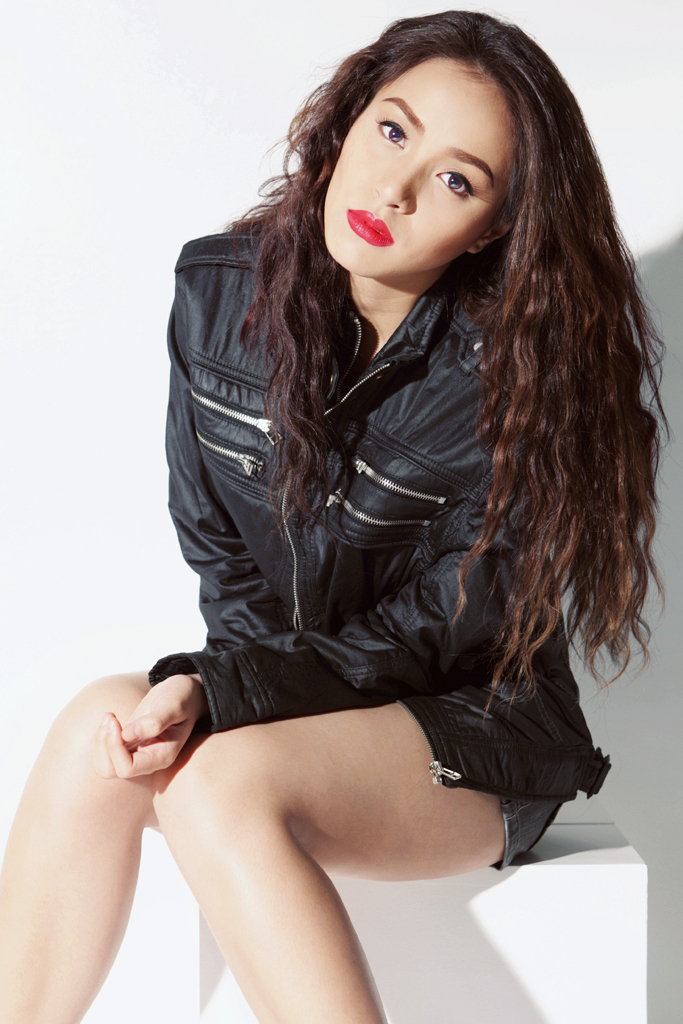
Cristine Reyes portrays Cassandra "Cassie"

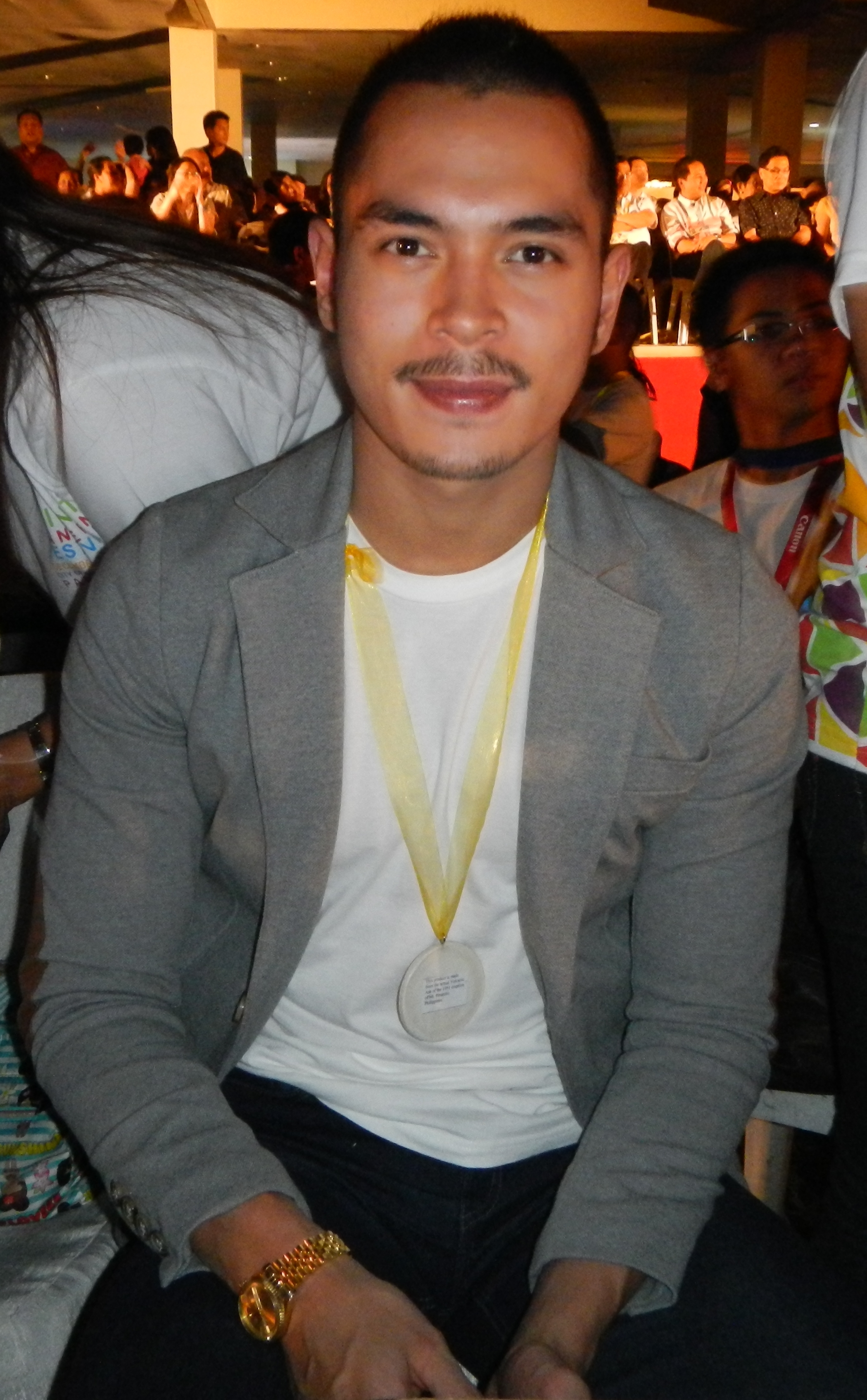
Jake Cuenca portrays Yuri

- Cristine Reyes as Cassandra "Cassie" Manuel
- Gabby Concepcion as Emmanuel "Emman" Luis
- Alice Dixson as Audrey Luis
- Andi Eigenmann as Jenny Luis
- Jake Cuenca as Yuri

=== Supporting cast ===
- Dina Bonnevie as Zelda Kagaoan-Luis
- Pilar Pilapil as Cynthia Manuel
- Anton Revilla as Gabe Kagaoan

=== Special participation ===
- Hideo Muraoka as Paolo
- Lander Vera Perez as Noel
- DJ Durano as Miko
- Shy Carlos as Chloe
- Jaime Fabregas as Yuri's father
- Ana Abad Santos as Grace
- Thou Reyes as Petra

=== Cameo appearance ===
- Nadine Lustre as Jenny's friend

== Awards and nominations ==
Year	Film Award/Critics	Category	Recipient(s)	Result	Source
2014	16th Gawad PASADO Awards	PinakaPasadong Katuwang na Aktor	Jake Cuenca	Won	
2014	16th Gawad PASADO Awards	PinakaPasadong Aktres	Alice Dixson	Won	
2014	Yahoo! OMG! Awards	Movie of the Year	When the Love is Gone (shared with the cast)	Nominated	

== International screening ==
Starting December 6, 2013, When the Love Is Gone will be shown in selected theaters in Los Angeles, San Francisco, San Diego, Las Vegas, Virginia, Texas, Arizona, Nevada, Washington and Hawaii.

== Reception ==
=== Critical response ===
Bernie Franco of PEP.ph gave the film a positive review, stating "When The Love Is Gone can hardly be accused of simply riding on the bandwagon because it is a remake of the 1983 Filipino movie "Nagalit ang Buwan sa Haba ng Gabi". He also stated that "the twists in the story are definitely something to watch for and these separate When The Love is Gone from other drama movies also tackling the same theme" and "is worth watching despite the proliferation of movies about extramarital affairs nowadays." He also praised the cast's performance and the film's script.

Pablo Tariman of The Philippine Star also gave the film a positive review, stating that "When the Love Is Gone is another polished variation of a beautiful love story sensually told with wit and finesse." He also praised Ranay's astounding performance as a director.

However, Phylber Ortiz Dy gave a negative review gave the film 1 out of 5 stars, stating that When the Love Is Gone "is all just nonsense. The relationships don't make any sense, and the people do not act like real human beings." He also stated that "When the Love is Gone only gets worse in its endgame. There it disregards whatever trauma the characters went through to provide a shade of a happy ending [...] Nothing really happened. The whole thing was just an exercise in creating scenes where women yell at each other and generally behave badly. It is toxic and hateful and generally just terrible."

== See also ==
- Nagalit ang Buwan sa Haba ng Gabi
