= In the Name of Love (2011 film) =

- Theatrical release poster
- Directed by: Olivia Lamasan
- Screenplay by: Olivia Lamasan; Enrico C. Santos
- Story by: Enrico C. Santos
- Produced by: Charo Santos-Concio; Malou N. Santos; Marizel Samson-Martinez
- Starring: Angel Locsin; Aga Muhlach; Jake Cuenca
- Cinematography: Hermann Claravall
- Edited by: Marya Ignacio
- Music by: Von De Guzman
- Production company: Star Cinema
- Distributed by: ABS-CBN Film Productions
- Release date: May 11, 2011
- Running time: 122 minutes
- Country: Philippines
- Language: Filipino
- Box office: ₱117 million

In the Name of Love is a 2011 Filipino romantic drama film directed by Olivia M. Lamasan and co-written by Enrico C. Santos. The film stars Aga Muhlach, Angel Locsin, and Jake Cuenca.

Produced and distributed by ABS-CBN Film Productions for its 18th founding anniversary, the film was theatrically released on May 11, 2011. It is produced and released by Star Cinema.

== Plot ==
With barely anything to live for, Emman Toledo, a former dancer, is just about to start his life all over again. He holds the memories of his past, knowing he will never be able to bring back his better days. An unlikely opportunity comes up when he is assigned to be the dance instructor for the upcoming Governor's Ball of the powerful political family of the Evelinos, a chance for him to rekindle his lost passion.

It will be at this ball where the engagement of the governor's son, Dylan Evelino, and Cedes Fernandez will be announced. Despite her hatred for the dirty politics, Cedes has no choice but to succumb to the decision of Dylan.

Emman is drawn towards Cedes from the first time she catches his eye. As their lives intertwine through dance, Emman and Cedes find themselves resisting an affair: one that holds the truths to their painful pasts, and the memories of a boundless love. Pursuing their feelings for each other will only set fire to the dangers and trappings of their love, so much so that their love could cost them their lives. Can the strength of their love overcome the powers of the dangers surrounding them?

== Cast ==
=== Main cast ===
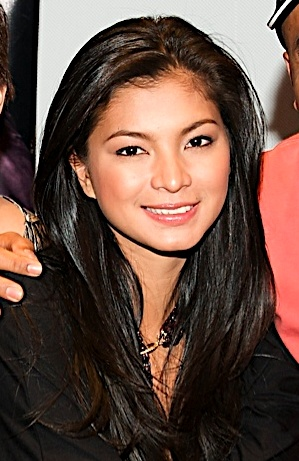
Angel Locsin portrays Mercedes "Cedes" Fernandez.

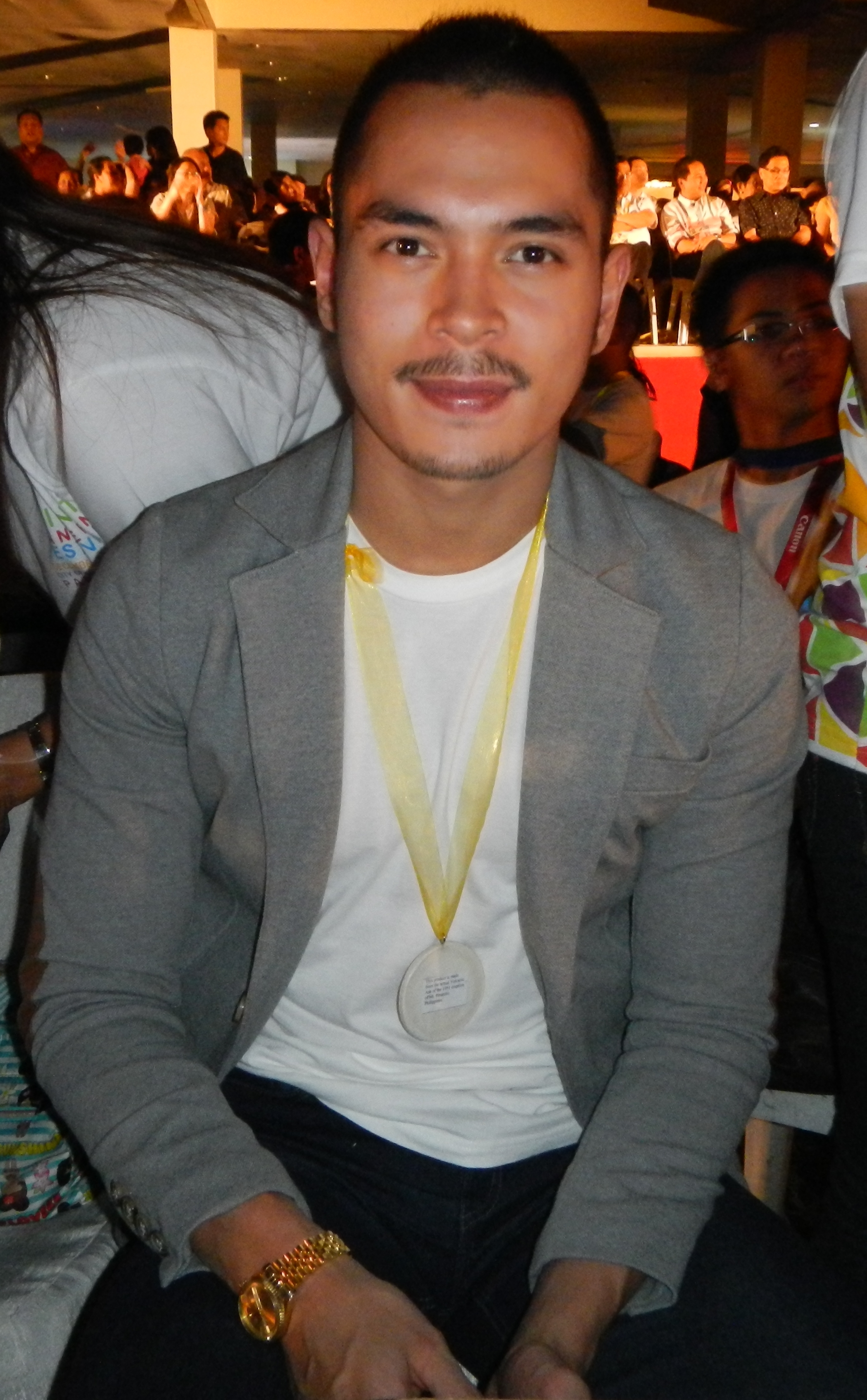
Jake Cuenca portrays Dylan Evelino.

- Aga Muhlach as Emman Toledo/Garry Fernandez
- Angel Locsin as Mercedes "Cedes" Fernandez
- Jake Cuenca as Dylan Evelino

=== Supporting cast ===
- Carmi Martin as Chloe Evelino
- Ryan Eigenmann as Homer Evelino
- Smokey Manoloto as Patrick
- Leo Rialp as Gov. Tony Evelino
- Kat Alano as Rita Evelino
- Emilio Garcia as Dan
- Bobby Andrews as Neil
- Dimples Romana as Emily
- Michael Flores as Toby
- Joshua Zamora as Jojo
- Nanding Josef as Mayor Boborol
- Maliksi Morales as Otap
- Paul Salas as Migo
- Dante Rivero as Roger

== Reception ==
=== Launch ===
The film's trailer was released on April 20, 2011, on the film's official website. The trailer included scenes that were shot in Tokyo, Japan and the theme song of the film is "(Where Do I Begin?) Love Story", which was sung by Gary Valenciano.

=== Box office ===
The film placed at the 15th spot in a Top 20 list of movies worldwide with the highest gross on the week of May 11, 2011, to May 18, 2011. It grossed $1,917,443 (approximately P84 million) in the box office, as reported by the Associated Press on May 19.

=== International screenings ===
The film had international premieres in two cities in the United States, both in the state of California. One on May 28, 2011, in Los Angeles and on May 29, 2011, in San Francisco.

== Accolades ==
Year	Award giving body	Category	Recipient	Result
2012	28th PMPC Star Awards for Movies	Movie of the Year		Nominated
2012	28th PMPC Star Awards for Movies	Movie Director of the Year	Olivia M. Lamasan	Nominated
2012	28th PMPC Star Awards for Movies	Movie Actress of the Year	Angel Locsin	Won
2012	28th PMPC Star Awards for Movies	Movie Actor of the Year	Aga Muhlach	Won
2012	28th PMPC Star Awards for Movies	Movie Supporting Actor of the Year	Jake Cuenca	Won
2012	28th PMPC Star Awards for Movies	Movie Original Screenplay of the Year	Olivia Lamasan & Enrico Santos	Won
2012	28th PMPC Star Awards for Movies	Movie Cinematographer of the Year	Hermann Claravall	Nominated
2012	28th PMPC Star Awards for Movies	Movie Editor of the Year	Marya Ignacio	Nominated
2012	28th PMPC Star Awards for Movies	Movie Production Designer of the Year	Leo Abaya	Nominated
2012	28th PMPC Star Awards for Movies	Movie Musical Scorer of the Year	Von de Guzman	Nominated
2012	28th PMPC Star Awards for Movies	Movie Sound Engineer of the Year	Albert Michael Idioma	Won
2012	14th Gawad Pasado 2011	Pinakapasadong Pelikula		Won
2012	14th Gawad Pasado 2011	Pinakapasadong Direktor	Olivia M. Lamasan	Won
2012	14th Gawad Pasado 2011	Pinakapasadong Aktor	Aga Muhlach	Won
2012	14th Gawad Pasado 2011	PINAKAPASADONG Aktres	Angel Locsin	Won
2012	14th Gawad Pasado 2011	Pinakapasadong Istorya	Enrico Santos & Olivia M. Lamasan	Won
2012	14th Gawad Pasado 2011	Pinakapasadong Editing	Marya Ignacio	Won
2012	43rd Box Office Entertainment Awards	Film Actor of the Year	Aga Muhlach	Won
2012	43rd Box Office Entertainment Awards	Film Actress of the Year	Angel Locsin	Won
2012	ENPRESS Golden Screen Awards 2012	Best Performance by an Actor in a Leading Role (Drama)	Aga Muhlach	Won
2012	ENPRESS Golden Screen Awards 2012	Best Performance by an Actress in a Leading Role (Drama)	Angel Locsin	Nominated
2012	Gawad Urian Awards	Best Supporting Actor (Pinakamahusay na Pangalawang Aktor)	Jake Cuenca	Nominated
2012	60th FAMAS Awards	Best Picture		Nominated
2012	60th FAMAS Awards	Best Director	Olivia M. Lamasan	Nominated
2012	60th FAMAS Awards	Best Actress	Angel Locsin	Nominated
2012	60th FAMAS Awards	Best Actor	Aga Muhlach	Nominated
2012	60th FAMAS Awards	Best Supporting Actor	Jake Cuenca	Nominated
2012	60th FAMAS Awards	Best Supporting Actress	Carmi Martin	Nominated
2012	60th FAMAS Awards	Best Story	Enrico Santos	Nominated
2012	60th FAMAS Awards	Best Screenplay	Olivia Lamasan & Enrico Santos	Nominated
2012	60th FAMAS Awards	Best Cinematography	Hermann Claravall	Nominated
2012	60th FAMAS Awards	Best Editing	Marya Ignacio	Nominated
2012	60th FAMAS Awards	Best Sound	Aurel Claro Bilbao	Nominated
2012	60th FAMAS Awards	Best Musical Score	Von De Guzman	Nominated
2012	60th FAMAS Awards	Best Theme Song	Jericho Rosales for the song "Naaalala Ka"	Nominated
2012	60th FAMAS Awards	Best Production Design	Shari Marie Montiague	Nominated
2012	60th FAMAS Awards	Best Special Effects	Erick Torrente	Nominated
2012	60th FAMAS Awards	Best Visual Effects	Fiona Marie Borres	Nominated
