= Rayver Cruz =

Filipino actor (born 1989)

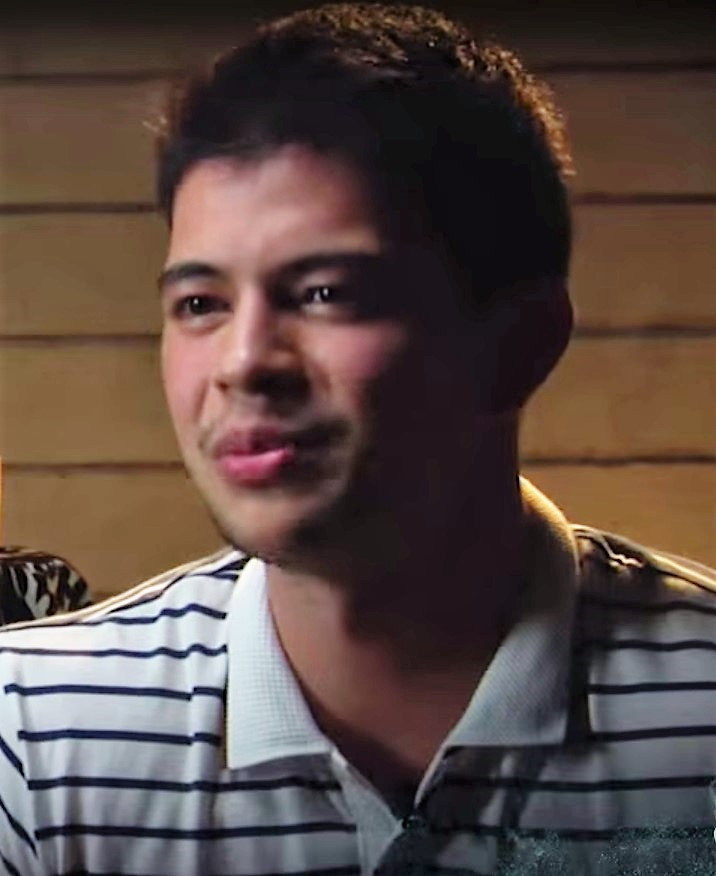
- Cruz in a 2014 promotional short about the making of Dilim
- Born: Raymond Oliver Cruz Ilustre; July 20, 1989 (age 37); Las Piñas, Metro Manila, Philippines
- Education: Saint Francis of Assisi College (BS)
- Occupations: Actor; dancer; singer; host; model
- Years active: 1993–present
- Agents: Star Magic (2002–2018); Sparkle (1995–2002; 2018–present)
- Height: 1.85 m (6 ft 1 in)
- Family: Rodjun Cruz (brother); Sunshine Cruz (cousin); Donna Cruz (cousin); Geneva Cruz (cousin); Sheryl Cruz (cousin); Tirso Cruz III (uncle); Ricky Belmonte (uncle)

Raymond Oliver Cruz Ilustre (born July 20, 1989), better known by his screen name Rayver Cruz (Tagalog pronunciation: [ˈkɾus]), is a Filipino actor. He is currently an exclusive actor of GMA Network.

== Early life and education ==
Rayver Cruz is a member of the Cruz family, a notable family line in the Philippine entertainment industry, which includes his cousins Sheryl Cruz, Sunshine Cruz, Geneva Cruz and Donna Cruz. He has two older brothers, Rodjun Cruz and Omar Cruz-Ilustre. His father, Rodolfo L. Ilustre, died in 2009 from kidney failure. He finished Grade 6 in Saint Mark's Institute in Las Piñas.

Cruz graduated in 2010 with a Bachelor of Science degree in business administration from Saint Francis of Assisi College in Las Piñas.

== Career ==
Cruz started as a former host together with his brother Rodjun in a children's magazine show 5 and Up on ABC (now TV5). In 1994, he moved to GMA Network and started as a child actor in the comedy show Kiss Muna, then moved to ABS-CBN in 2002 and became part of their contract talents before becoming a Star Magic talent.

His first lead role was in the 2005 primetime TV series Spirits as Red, with actress Maja Salvador. He played another lead role as Mythos in the 2007 primetime show Rounin.

On June 14, 2018, he left Star Magic, but he remained in Bagani, his final project at ABS-CBN. After 18 years, Cruz returned to his home network, GMA Network as he signed a contract on September 6, 2018. Aside from acting and dancing, he is given a big break in singing and hosting career when he hosted some GMA programs like the defunct variety show Studio 7, and singing competition The Clash along with Julie Anne San Jose.

Cruz is currently a part of variety show All-Out Sundays.

== Personal life ==
Cristine Reyes and Cruz began their romance in 2011 when he allegedly left his ex-girlfriend Sarah Geronimo. Reyes and Cruz separated ways in 2012. He also dated Janine Gutierrez for four years and the couple confirmed break-up in November 2021.

Cruz and Julie Anne San Jose began dating in February 2022 as they also exchanged "I love you's" on November 26, 2023 at the Newport Performing Arts Theater.

== Filmography ==
=== Film ===
Year	Title	Role
2002	Pakisabi Na Lang Na Mahal Ko Siya	Geomar
2003	Mr. Suave	Carl
2007	Happy Hearts	Alvin
2007	Bahay Kubo: A Pinoy Mano Po!	Cholo
2007	Katas ng Saudi	Kyle
2008	Kelly! Kelly! (Ang Hit na Musical)	Boom
2009	You Changed My Life	Marcelo "Macoy" Romero
2009	Shake, Rattle & Roll XI: Lamang Lupa	Archie
2010	Cinco: Mata	Alvin
2010	Shake, Rattle and Roll 12: Isla	Ray
2011	Forever and A Day	Mico
2011	A Mother's Story	King
2013	On the Job	Bernabe
2013	Saturday Night Chills	Mark
2014	Dilim	Emerson
2015	Ex with Benefits	Andrew
2015	Filemon Mamon	Mr. Magdalo
2015	Buy Now, Die Later	Ato
2017	Ang Larawan	Charlie Dacanay
2018	K9	Francis Dominador
2018	Badge of Honor: To Serve and Protect	PCpl. Jumeil Javier
2021	On the Job: The Missing 8	Bernabe
2023	The Cheating Game	Miguel
2025	Sinagtala	Reggie

=== Television ===
Year	Title	Role
1993–2002	5 and Up	Host
1997	Ibang Klase	Contestant
1999	F.L.A.M.E.S.	Vince
2000	Kiss Muna	Piolo
2002	Maalaala Mo Kaya: Yearbook	
2004–05	Spirits	Red
2004	Maalaala Mo Kaya: CD	
2005–06	Nginiig	Host
2005	Ikaw ang Lahat sa Akin	Nat
2005	Maalaala Mo Kaya	Billy Crawford
2005	ASAP Fanatic	Host
2006–18	ASAP	Himself
2006	Komiks Presents: Agua Bendita	Ronnie
2006	Love Spell: Charm & Crystal	Johnny
2006	Your Song: Cuida	Samuel
2006	Star Magic Presents: My Friend, My love, My Destiny	Jun
2006	Da Adventures of Pedro Penduko	Allan / Aswang II
2006	Maalaala Mo Kaya: Rugby	Jomar
2006	Star Magic Presents: Abt Ur Luv	Genesis 'Gens' Brondial
2007	Love Spell: Shoes Ko Po, Shoes Ko ’Day!	Stephen
2007	Rounin	Mythos
2007	Your Song: Break It To Me Gently	Nico
2007	Maalaala Mo Kaya: Ilog	Eden
2007	Your Song: Just A Smile Away	Brian
2008	Your Song: Kapag Ako Ang Nagmahal	Jack
2008	That's My Doc	Jai
2008	Maalaala Mo Kaya: Board Game	Dennis
2009–10	May Bukas Pa	Francisco "Cocoy" Bautista
2010	Magkano ang Iyong Dangal?	Troy Sandoval
2010	Maalaala Mo Kaya: Cross-Stitch	Rey
2010	Wansapanataym: Inday Bote	Greg
2010–11	Precious Hearts Romances Presents:Kristine	Lance Navarro
2011	Maalaala Mo Kaya: Tsinelas	Joward "Jawo" Johnson
2011–12	Reputasyon	Henry Aragon
2012	Maalaala Mo Kaya: Saklay - The Bringas Brothers Story	Kurt Bringas
2012	Ako ang Simula	Himself
2012	Toda Max	Jun-Jun
2012	Maalaala Mo Kaya: Motorsiklo	Xerces
2013	Bukas na Lang Kita Mamahalin	Marcus Ramirez
2013	Maalaala Mo Kaya: Pasa	Raymond
2014	Ipaglaban Mo: Akin Ka Lang	Anderson
2014–15	Two Wives	Robert Dale Gopez-Del Valle
2015	Nathaniel	Arkanghel Josiah
2015	All of Me	Marlon Santos
2016	Maalaala Mo Kaya: Alkansya	Ryan
2016–17	Doble Kara	Banjo Manrique
2017	Maalaala Mo Kaya: Mesa	Lan
2017	Maalaala Mo Kaya: Karayom	Joey
2018	Bagani	Kidlat
2018–19	Studio 7	Host / Performer
2018–19	Asawa Ko, Karibal Ko	Gavin Corpus
2018	Magpakailanman: Impyerno sa Dagat	Arnel
2019	Hanggang sa Dulo ng Buhay Ko	Matteo Divinagracia
2019–present	The Clash	Himself
2020–present	All-Out Sundays	Himself
2021	Nagbabagang Luha	Alex Montaire
2022	Bolera	Miguel "El Salvador"
2024–25	Asawa ng Asawa Ko	Jordan Manansala
2025	Sanggang-Dikit FR	Jared Lopez
2026	Stars on the Floor	Himself / Judge
2026	Born to Shine	Dio Halari

=== Web series ===
Year	Title	Role	Notes
2023	Pag-ibig na Kaya	Miguel	Main role / Protagonist

== Discography ==
=== Singles ===
- 2007: "Kembot" (as part of ASAP)
- 2016: "Bitaw"
- 2023: "Pag-Ibig na Kaya" (with Julie Anne San Jose)
- 2026: "Dust of the Universe"

=== Appearances ===
Year released	Album title	Details	Record label
2007	ASAP Ultimate Dance 4	First ASAP dance album certified platinum; single: "Kembot"	ASAP Music/Star Records
2010	ASAP Supahdance 2	Second dance album with Kim Chiu, John Prats, Gab Valenciano & Mickey Perz	ASAP Music/Star Records

== Concerts ==
Year	Title	Artists	Details
2012	Star Magic 20	Star Magic Artists	Shrine Auditorium in Los Angeles
2012	Teleserye Princes	Gerald Anderson, Sam Milby, Pokwang, Enchong Dee, Xian Lim, Jason Abalos	James Logan High School, Union City, California
2012	Teleserye Bida	Gerald Anderson, Sam Milby, Pokwang, Enchong Dee, Xian Lim, Jason Abalos	US Tour
2013	Teleserye Bida	Gerald Anderson, Enchong Dee, Xian Lim, Enrique Gil	US and Canada Tour with John Lapus
2014	Primetime Hearthrobs	Gerald Anderson, Enchong Dee, Xian Lim, Enrique Gil	The Indian High School football ground in Dubai
2014	Teleserye Bida	Gerald Anderson, Enchong Dee, Xian Lim, Enrique Gil	Australia Tour!
2014	Teleserye Bida	Gerald Anderson, Enchong Dee, Xian Lim, Enrique Gil, Maja Salvador	Al Gharafa Sports Club Stadium in Al Gharafa, Doha, Qatar
2015	Teleserye Bida	Gerald Anderson, Enchong Dee, Xian Lim, Enrique Gil, Liza Soberano	The Queen Elizabeth Theatre, Toronto
2017	Star Magic 25	Star Magic Artists	U.S. and Canada Tour!
2019	Kapusong Pinoy: Studio 7 Musikalye Sa Brooklyn	Christian Bautista, Alden Richards, Julie Anne San Jose, Kyline Alcantara, Golden Cañedo, Betong Sumaya	Kings Theatre in New York
2022	One Magical Night	Sam Milby, Catriona Gray, Marcelito Pomoy	Canada Tour
2022	Together Again: A GMA Pinoy TV at 17 Concert	Dingdong Dantes, Bea Alonzo, Lani Misalucha, Ai-Ai delas Alas, Julie Anne San Jose	Pechanga Theater, Pechanga Resort Casino in Temecula, California
2022	JulieVerse	Julie Anne San Jose, Kyline Alcantara, Mavy Legaspi	Newport Performing Arts Theater
2023	Taste Of Manila 2023: Isang Dekada Na! (JulieVer Concert)	Julie Anne San Jose	Toronto, Canada
2023	Luv trip na, Luff trip pa!: JulieVer in Concert With Boobay!	Julie Anne San Jose; Boobay	Tel-Aviv, Israel
2024	Sparkle Tour	Julie Anne San Jose, Barbie Forteza, David Licauco, Ruru Madrid, Bianca Umali	Canada Tour
2024	Sparkle Tour	Alden Richards, Julie Anne San Jose, Ai-Ai Delas Alas, Isko Moreno, Boobay	USA Tour
2024	Sparkle Tour	Julie Anne San Jose, Jillian Ward, Ken Chan, Bianca Umali, Ruru Madrid	Japan
2024	JulieVer Live in Melbourne	Julie Anne San Jose	Australia
2024	JulieVer Live in Sydney	Julie Anne San Jose	Australia

== Accolades ==
=== Awards and nominations ===
Year	Award-giving body	Category	Work	Result	Ref.
2004	Aliw Awards	Best Dance Group (Modern)	Anime	Won	
2012	60th FAMAS Awards	Best Supporting Actor	A Mother's Story	Nominated	
2013	Cinema One Originals Awards	Best Actor	Saturday Night Chills	Won	
2019	4th Gems Awards	Best Single Performance	Magpakailanman "Impyerno Sa Dagat"	Nominated	
2021	34th PMPC Star Awards for Television	Best Talent Search Program Hosts with Julie Anne San Jose	The Clash	Nominated	
2022	Gawad Karangalan Para Sa Pilipino	Outstanding Performer and Actor of the Year	Bolera and All Out Sundays	Won	
2022	Dakilang Filipino Awards	Best Male Celebrity Of The Year	Himself	Won	
2022	6th Gems Awards	Best Male Talent Search Program Host	The Clash	Nominated	
2022	5th Asia Pacific Luminare Awards	Most Versatile Actor and Host of the Year	Nagbabagang Luha and The Clash	Won	
2023	35th PMPC Star Awards for Television	Best Talent Search Program Host with Julie Anne San Jose	The Clash	Won	
2024	Gawad Dangal	Best Actor	Asawa ng Asawa Ko	Won	
2025	10th Platinum Stallion Media Awards	TV Actor of the Year	Asawa ng Asawa Ko	Won	
2025	38th PMPC Star Awards for Television	Best Talent Search Program Host with Julie Anne San Jose	The Clash	Won	
