= Jake Cuenca =

Filipino actor (born 1987)

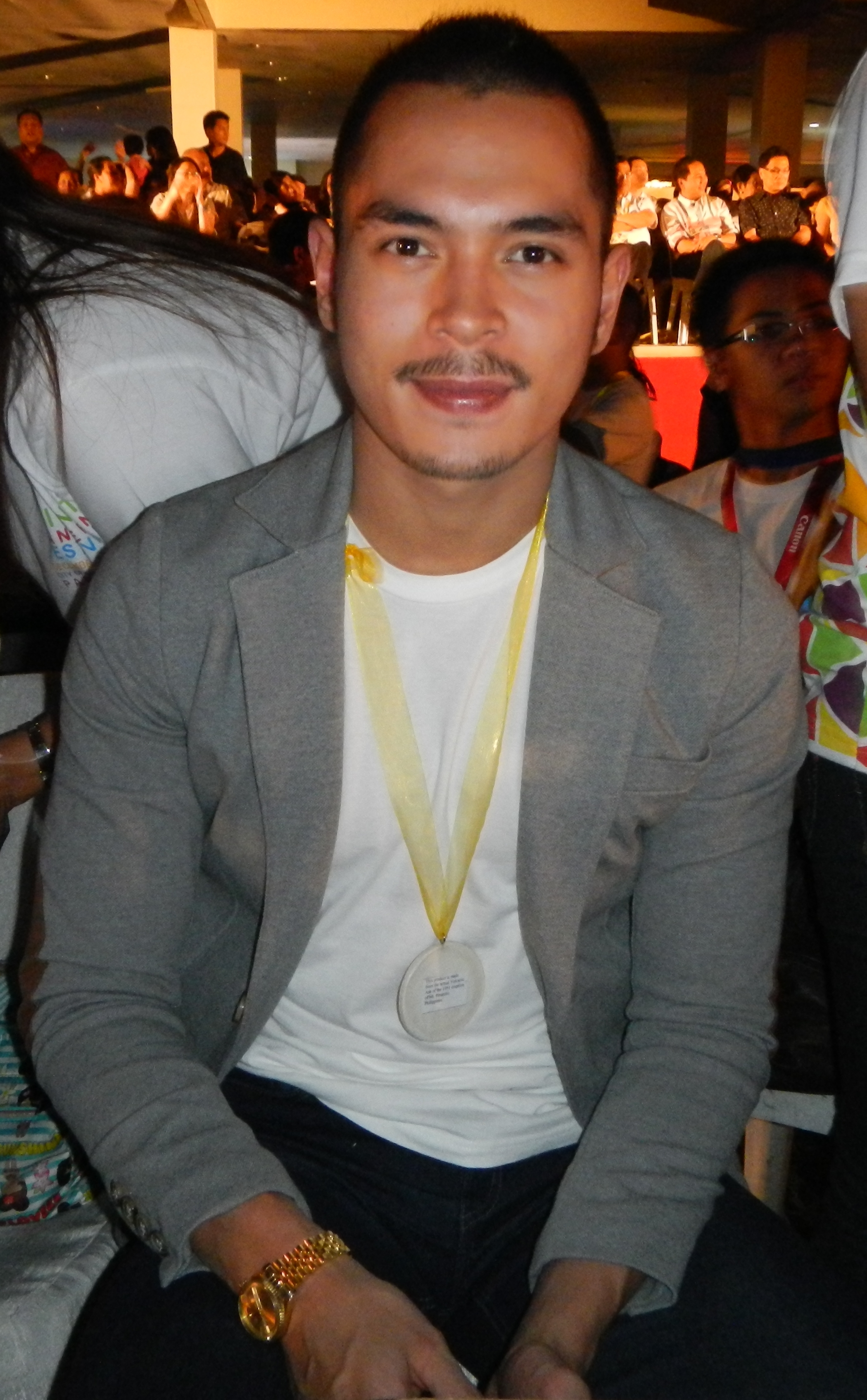
- Born: Juan Carlos Leveriza Cuenca; December 30, 1987 (age 38); San Jose, California, U.S.
- Occupation: Actor
- Years active: 1998–present
- Agents: Sparkle; Star Magic
- Relatives: Tomas Morato (great-grandfather); Manuel Morato (granduncle)

Juan Carlos "Jake" Leveriza Cuenca (born December 30, 1987) is a Filipino actor. He also played for United Football League Division 2 sides Team Socceroo FC.

== Early life and background ==
Cuenca attended PAREF Southridge School, an all-boys school in Muntinlupa City, for his elementary and high school education. As a child, he struggled with his weight, which motivated him to become active in sports. He became a varsity football player in school and later played professionally for Team Socceroo F.C. in the United Football League.

== Acting career ==
At the age of nine, Cuenca was discovered by talent scout juan for Cosmo Modeling Agency. Soon after, Cuenca appeared in several television and print advertisements including those for Safeguard, Coke and Globe Telecom. At eleven, he had cameo roles in movies such as Takbo Barbara Takbo and Panday in 1998. It was followed by another cameo in the 1999 film adaptation of the fantasy anthology, Wansapanataym.

In 2003, he returned to show business under GMA Network and appeared in the youth-oriented drama series, Click, where he was welcomed as a member of its third batch. Cuenca played a number of supporting roles in Hanggang Kailan, Forever in My Heart and the fifth season of Love to Love. In 2005, he starred as Kahlil in the hit fantasy series Encantadia. He also appeared in the ninth season of Love to Love titled “Miss Match”. In 2006, he starred as one of the wizards in the fantasy-themed television series, Majika, which became his last teleserye with GMA.

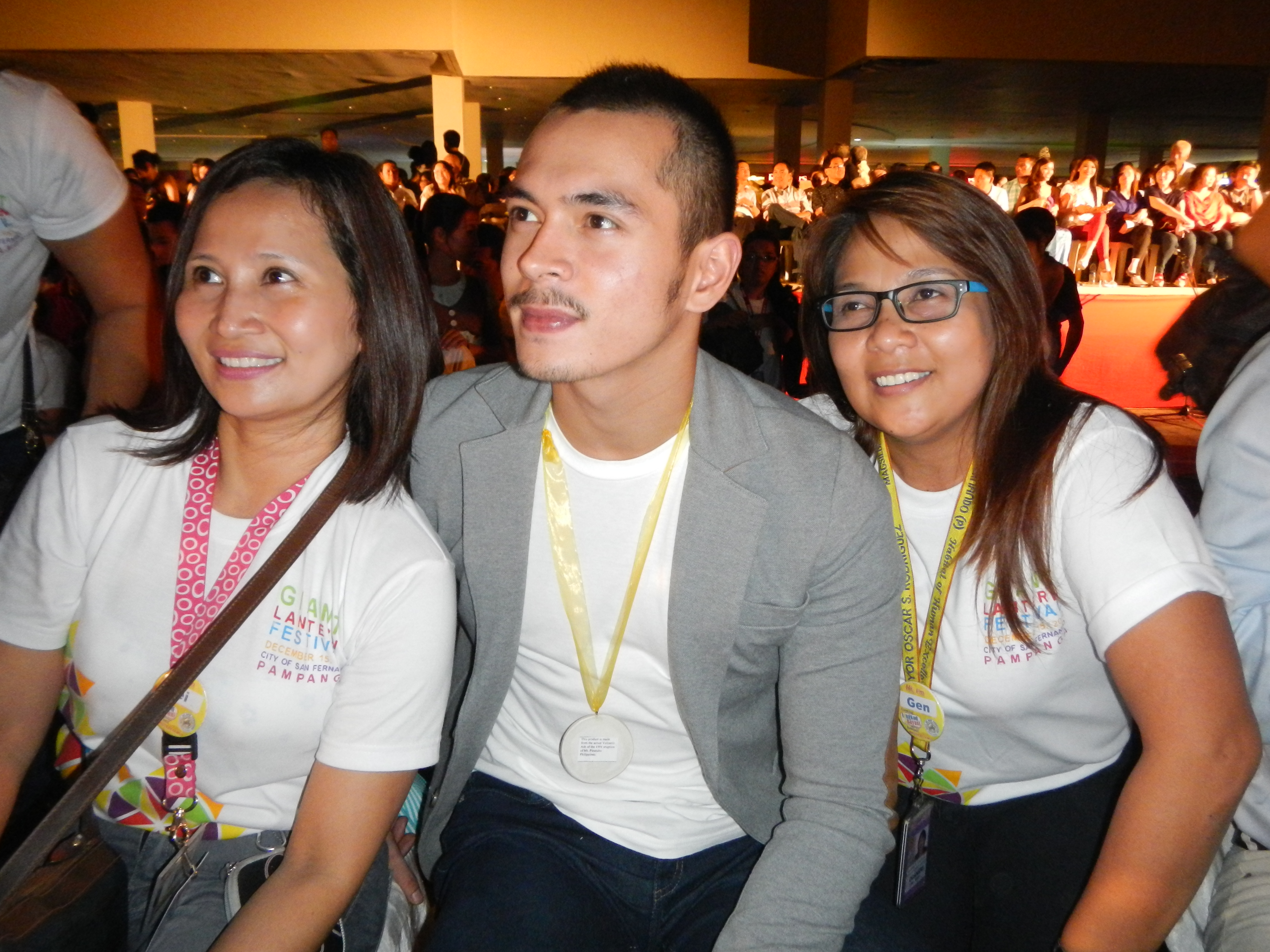
Cuenca in 2012

After transferring to ABS-CBN in 2006, he appeared in an episode of Love Spell, "Home Switch Home".

In 2007, he became part of the cast of the network's soap opera Sana Maulit Muli, his first primetime drama series on the network. Also, he starred as his first leading role in Sineserye Presents: Natutulog Ba Ang Diyos?. He portrayed Andrew - a rich, spoiled and irresponsible teen guy secretly in love with leading actress Roxanne Guinoo. Later, he was cast in the fantasy series Lastikman. He appeared in total 14 shows of ABS-CBN from late 2006 to 2007.

In 2008, he landed the lead role in ABS-CBN's remake of the action series Palos with Cesar Montano. He also played the main role of Kiko with Shaina Magdayao in Your song Presents: A million miles away. In the mini-series, he played Kiko -an assistant of Lizzie's father who asks him become a "babysitter" for Lizzie and her mean boyfriend, under the instruction of Lizzie's father. It is revealed that Kiko has been secretly in love with her for a long time.

In 2009, he starred in Tayong Dalawa alongside Kim Chiu, where he gained recognition and criticism. He portrayed David “Dave” Garcia Jr, a jack-a-dandy soldier in the Philippine Army caught in a love triangle with Gerald Anderson and Kim Chiu. The hit show was broadcast in neighbouring Singapore, Malaysia, Vietnam, Brunei, Cambodia, as well as several African countries. That same year, he appeared in Precious Hearts Romances Presents: My Cheating Heart alongside Cristine Reyes.

In 2010, he portrayed the role of Alejandro in the Filipino remake of Rubi alongside Angelica Panganiban and Shaina Magdayao. He also starred as Elias Paniki in the fourth story of the Agimat series Elias Paniki alongside Sam Pinto and Xian Lim.

In 2011, he joined the main cast as Edward in the Filipino remake of the Korean drama Green Rose alongside Jericho Rosales, Anne Curtis and Alessandra De Rossi. After that, he portrayed Darmo Adarna, the well-known superhero of Filipino cartoon in Wansapanataym: Darmo Adarna, opposite Yen Santos. Different from a super-powered boy with a giant bird in the comic, Darmo Adarna in the show grows up as an overweight loser who is magically transformed into a muscular hero.

In 2012, he played the role of Paul Raymundo in Kung Ako'y Iiwan Mo alongside two female stars Shaina Magdayao and Bangs Garcia, The triangle love and OFW story in the film attracted the interest of audience. The series reached top rating in 2012 although it was aired in the afternoon. Also that same year, he was part of the primetime series Kahit Puso'y Masugatan as Rafael - a young and charming photographer with a tragic life. It is really the challenging role for him because of his inner struggles in the film.

In 2013, he portrayed the role of Luis Sancuevas in the Filipino remake of Maria Mercedes with leading lady Jessy Mendiola and Jason Abalos.

In 2014, he starred as the main antagonist Franco in the epic drama series Ikaw Lamang with an ensemble cast.

In 2015–2016, he portrayed the role of Juan, one of the Samonte Brothers in the romantic drama series Pasión de amor, a Philippine adaptation of Telemundo-produced Pasión de Gavilanes, one of the most famous TV series in the year with top rating.

In the field of cinema, Cuenca was seen in mainstream films: In the Name of Love, Status: It's complicated, My Neighbor's Wife, Villa Estrella, Tuhog.... and featured in indie films such as: H.I.V.: Si Heidi, Si Ivy at si V (2010) - a film about AIDS, Nuwebe (2013), a film about child sexual abuse which gained local and international awards, Lihis (2013), Mulat (2014). Jake won his first best actor award at the International Film Festival Manhattan (IFFM) in New York in 2014 for his performance in Diane Ventura's Mulat (Awaken), the same movie that won for him his second best actor at the 2016 World Cinema Festival in Copacabana, Brazil.

In 2022, he appears in The Iron Heart as Eros del Rio, the main antagonist in season 2 of the series who works as a CIB Agent but he is actually a secret leader of a crime organization called Altare.

In 2025, he stars in FPJ's Batang Quiapo as Cong. Miguelito Guerrero, a politician and a candidate for the mayoralty of Manila, playing as one of the major antagonists of the show, wherein he reunited with Coco Martin, his co-star in Tayong Dalawa, Ikaw Lamang & Ang Panday, as well as Albert Martinez, his co-star in The Iron Heart (TV series), and Angel Aquino, his co-staer in "Ikaw Lamang".

== Other ventures ==
=== Sports career ===
Cuenca is a sports enthusiast, even during his younger days. Due to a weight problem he encountered as a child, he was determined to play sports more when he grew up. Although he has done boxing and mixed martial arts, he is mainly a football player, playing twice a week. As an elementary and high school student, Cuenca played as a football varsity player for PAREF Southridge School.

In October 2011, he signed up for Team Socceroo F.C., which at that time played as a guest club in the 2011–12 United Football Cup, and later entered in the United Football League Division 2. He is yet to play for the first team as showbiz commitments have not permitted him to do so.

Cuenca has also shown interest to try out for the Philippines in international competitions.

== Personal life ==
Cuenca dated actress and beauty queen Kylie Verzosa from 2019 until April 2022. Jake then moved out of the condominium unit he shared with Verzosa and unto a new house. The former couple has two pets: Nugget, a bulldog and Leo, a poodle.

He was dating actress Chie Filomeno from 2023 to 2025.

Currently, Cuenca is in a relationship with TV host and former beauty queen Rabiya Mateo.

=== Legal issues ===
On the night of October 9, 2021, the actor's black Jeep Wrangler hit a Mandaluyong police car stationed a checkpoint along Shaw Boulevard as part of a buy-bust operation. A plainclothes officer reported that Cuenca had not stopped for routine inspection and instead rammed through the checkpoint barriers, prompting police to chase him until his tires were shot and he was cornered along West Capitol Road in Pasig. A stray bullet hit a Grab deliveryman, who came out in stable condition. Cuenca claimed he was afraid to stop for inspection at the checkpoint as the police were plainclothes. He was allowed to leave the police precinct at 5:00 am the next day for medical attention. He initially faced charges of reckless imprudence resulting in damage to property.

== Acting credits ==
=== Film ===
Key
†	Denotes films that have not yet been released

Jake Cuenca's film credits with year of release, film titles and roles
Year	Title	Role	Ref.
1998	Takbo Barbara Takbo	Jordan	
1998	Hiwaga ng Panday	Dominic	
1999	Wansapanataym		
2004	Kilig... Pintig... Yanig...	Juancho	
2004	Spirit of the Glass	TJ	
2005	Say That You Love Me	Edward	
2008	For the First Time	Josh	
2009	Villa Estrella	Alex	
2010	H.I.V.: Si Heidi, Si Ivy at si V	Virgilio Bustamante	
2010	Super Inday and the Golden Bibe	Jeffrey "Amazing Jay"	
2011	In the Name of Love	Dylan Evelino	
2011	My Neighbor's Wife	Bullet Bernal	
2013	Tuhog	Renato 'Nato' Timbacaya	
2013	Nuwebe / Termitaria	Moises	
2013	Lihis	Cesar / Ka Jimmy	
2013	Status: It's Complicated	Manny	
2013	When the Love Is Gone	Yuri	
2014	El Brujo	Lucky	
2016	Foolish Love	Victor/ Rey Dela Cruz	
2016	Mano Po 7: Tsinoy	Marco	
2016	Mulat (Awaken)	Jake	
2017	Requitted	Matt Labrador	
2017	Ang Panday	Lizardo	
2019	Eerie	Julian Castro	
2019	KontrAdiksyon	Alexis Borlaza	
2019	Mission Unstapabol: The Don Identity	Don Johnson	
2020	Love Lockdown	Jacob	
2020	Sitsit	Scorpio	
2022	My Father, Myself	Robert	
2025	The Delivery Rider	Roden del Monte	

=== Television / digital series ===
Key
†	Denotes films that have not yet been released

Jake Cuenca's television credits with year of release, television titles and roles
Year	Title	Role	Ref.
2003	Click	Tryke	
2004	Hanggang Kailan	Warren Rosales	
2004	Forever in My Heart	William	
2004	SOP Sobrang Okey, Pare!	Himself	
2004	Love to Love: Love Blossoms	Trey	
2005	Encantadia	Kahlil	
2005	Love to Love: Miss Match	Migs	
2006	Majika	Terman	
2006	Komiks: Da Adventures of Pedro Penduko	Napoleon / Jaime Gatchalian	
2006	Love Spell: Home Switch Home	Juano	
2006	Your Song: Silent Night		
2007	Sana Maulit Muli	Brandon Johnson	
2007	Komiks: Pedro Penduko at ang mga Engkantao	Napoleon / Jaime Gatchalian	
2007	Your Song: Very Special Love	Gino	
2007	Love Spell: Sweet Sixty	Brian	
2007	Maalaala Mo Kaya: Application Form	Lt. Ariel Toledo	
2007	Natutulog Ba ang Diyos?	Andrew Angeles	
2007	That's My Doc	Jake	
2007	Mars Ravelo's Lastikman	Kenneth "Ken" Madrigal	
2008	Palos	Giancarlo Caranzo / Palos	
2008	I Am KC: Bb. Palengke	Jeremy	
2008	Your Song: A Million Miles Away	Kiko	
2008	Lovebooks Presents: Break-Up Diaries	Treak	
2008	Maalaala Mo Kaya: Sulat	Roger Ugnay	
2008	Komiks: Dragonna	Edgar	
2009	Tayong Dalawa	David "Dave" M. Garcia Jr.	
2009	Pangarap Kong Jackpot : Hawak Kita, Hawak Mo Ko		
2009	Precious Hearts Romances Presents: Bud Brothers	Vicente "Vince" Banaag	
2009	Maalaala Mo KayaEpisode: Pregnancy Kit	Arman	
2009	Your Song: Sa Kanya	Jordan	
2009	Precious Hearts Romances Presents: My Cheating Heart	Emilio "Mio" Sta. Romana	
2010	Maalaala Mo Kaya: Litrato	Fidel	
2010	Rubi	Alejandro Cardenas	
2010	Agimat: Ang Mga Alamat ni Ramon Revilla: Elias Paniki	Elias "Elias Paniki" Sta. Maria / Armando	
2010	Wansapanataym: Cara	Leandro	
2010	Your Song Presents: Andi	Aries (Episode: "Tell Me")	
2011	Your Song Presents: Kim	Max (Episode: "Till The End")	
2011	Green Rose	Edward Fuentebella	
2011	Showtime	Himself / Judge	
2011	Guns and Roses	Paolo Ventura	
2011	Wansapanataym: Darmo Adarna	Dario	
2011	Maalaala Mo Kaya: Susi	Louie	
2011	100 Days to Heaven	Young Tagasundo	
2012	Kung Ako'y Iiwan Mo	Paulino "Paul" Raymundo	
2012	Kahit Puso'y Masugatan	Rafael de Guzman	
2013	Maria Mercedes	Luis Sancuevas	
2014	Ikaw Lamang (Book 1)	Franco Hidalgo	
2014	Maalaala Mo Kaya: Palayan	Igge	
2015	Maalaala Mo Kaya: Spaghetti	Marvin	
2015	Pasión de Amor	Juan Samonte-Reyes	
2016	FPJ's Ang Probinsyano	Jonas Paulino	
2016	Ipaglaban Mo: Hardinero	Anton	
2017	Maalaala Mo Kaya: Soccer Ball	Jojo	
2017	Ikaw Lang ang Iibigin	Carlos Dela Vega	
2018	The Blood Sisters	Rocco Fernandez	
2018	Precious Hearts Romances Presents: Los Bastardos	Isagani Esperanza / Roman Cardinal Jr.	
2019	The Haunted	Jordan Robles	
2020	Walang Hanggang Paalam	Dexter Joaquin	
2020	Ate ng Ate Ko	Marco Toledo	
2021	Maalaala Mo Kaya: Blouse	Eddie Cuarenta	
2021	Viral Scandal	Troy Ramones	
2022	K-Love	Jay	
2022	The Iron Heart	Eros "Commando" Del Rio	
2023	Cattleya Killer	Benjie dela Rosa	
2023	Jack and Jill sa Diamond Hills	Jack Corporal	
2024	What's Wrong with Secretary Kim	Cyrus "Morpheus" Castillo	
2025	FPJ’s Batang Quiapo	Mayor Miguelito Guerrero	
2025	What Lies Beneath	Edmundo "Edong" Santiago	
TBA	Bride to Be †		

== Accolades ==
Name of the award ceremony, year presented, category, nominee of the award, and the result of the nomination
Year	Award ceremony	Category	Nominee / Work	Result	Ref.
2008	4th ASAP Pop Viewers' Choice Awards 2008	Pop Male Fashionista	—N/a	Nominated	
2009	5th ASAP Pop Viewers' Choice Awards 2009	Pop Male Fashionista	—N/a	Nominated	
2011	7th ASAP Pop Viewers' Choice Awards 2011	Pop Pin Up Boy	—N/a	Nominated	
2012	60th FAMAS Awards	Best Supporting Actor	In the Name of Love	Nominated	
2012	35th Gawad Urian Awards	Best Supporting Actor Pinakamahusay ng Pangalawang Aktor	In the Name of Love	Nominated	
2014	16th Gawad PASADO Awards	PinakaPASADOng Katuwang na Aktor	When the Love is Gone	Won	
2014	Yahoo! OMG! Philippines Awards	Male Kontrabida of the Year	Ikaw Lamang	Won	
2014	28th PMPC Star Awards for Movies	Movie Supporting Actor of the Year	In the Name of Love	Won	
2014	28th PMPC Star Awards for TV	Best Drama Supporting Actor	Ikaw Lamang	Nominated	
2014	International Film Festival Manhattan	Best Actor	Mulat (Awaken)	Won	
2014	5th Inquirer Indie Bravo Awards	Best Actor	Mulat (Awaken)	Won	
2014	Queens World Film Festival	Best Actor	Nuwebe	Nominated	
2015	ENPRESS Golden Screen TV Awards	Outstanding Supporting Actor in a Drama Program	Ikaw Lamang	Nominated	
2015	7th Ani Ng Dangal Awards	Best Actor	Mulat (Awaken)	Won	
2016	2016 World Cinema Festival in Copacabana, Brazil	Best actor	Mulat (Awaken)	Won	
2017	2017 Metro Manila Film Festival	Best Supporting Actor	Ang Panday	Nominated	
2019	2019 Philstage Gawad Buhay Awards	Best Male Lead Actor	Lungs	Nominated	
