= The Cheating Game =

Philippine romantic drama film

- Official movie poster
- Directed by: Rod Marmol
- Screenplay by: Rod Marmol; Jessie Villabrille; Sharon Masula
- Story by: Sharon Masula
- Produced by: Nessa Valdellon
- Starring: Julie Anne San Jose; Rayver Cruz
- Cinematography: Arnel Barbarona
- Edited by: Noah Tonga
- Music by: Jo-Edrei Cruz; Ann Margaret Figueroa
- Production companies: GMA Pictures; GMA Public Affairs
- Distributed by: GMA Pictures
- Release date: July 26, 2023
- Running time: 105 minutes
- Country: Philippines
- Language: Filipino

The Cheating Game is a 2023 Philippine romantic drama film directed by Rod Marmol. The film stars Julie Anne San Jose and Rayver Cruz.

== Plot ==
Hope (Julie Anne) devotes her life to her fiance Brian (Martin) and an organization they run. However, when Brian's sex video with a mystery woman surfaces online, Hope leaves him and their organization. She starts a new job as a content producer of a company that, unknown to her, moonlights as a troll factory. To prevent herself from getting cheated, she creates a "cheat sheet" as a guide for her to know every person she dates. Hope later on crosses paths with businessman Miguel (Rayver), in which she thought he's the perfect guy for her. However, as they get closer, long-kept secrets begin to unveil.

== Cast ==
Main cast

- Julie Anne San Jose as Hope Celestial
- Rayver Cruz as Miguel Agustin

Supporting cast

- Martin del Rosario as Brian Villogo
- Paolo Contis as Mister Y
- Yayo Aguila as Faith Celestial
- Candy Pangilinan as Tita Gelly
- Phi Palmos as Joi Celestial
- Thea Tolentino as Natalie
- Winwyn Marquez as Attorney Vanessa
- Charm Aranton as @Mimasabilang

== Release ==
The film was released to theaters nationwide on July 26, 2023. It was released worldwide on Netflix on October 26, 2023.
