= Forever in My Heart =

Philippine television drama series

- Title card
- Genre: Romantic drama
- Created by: R.J. Nuevas
- Directed by: Mark A. Reyes V; Phil Noble
- Starring: Regine Velasquez; Richard Gomez; Dawn Zulueta; Ariel Rivera
- Theme music composer: Joey Benin
- Opening theme: "Forevermore" by Regine Velasquez
- Country of origin: Philippines
- Original language: Tagalog
- No. of episodes: 75

Production
- Executive producer: Reggie Acuña-Magno
- Production locations: Tagaytay, Philippines
- Camera setup: Multiple-camera setup
- Running time: 30–45 minutes
- Production company: GMA Entertainment TV

Original release
- Network: GMA Network
- Release: September 27, 2004 – January 7, 2005

Forever in My Heart is a Philippine television drama romance series broadcast by GMA Network. Directed by Mark A. Reyes V and Phil Noble, it stars Regine Velasquez, Richard Gomez, Ariel Rivera and Dawn Zulueta. It premiered on September 27, 2004, on the network's Telebabad line up. The series concluded on January 7, 2005, with a total of 75 episodes.

== Cast and characters ==
Cast

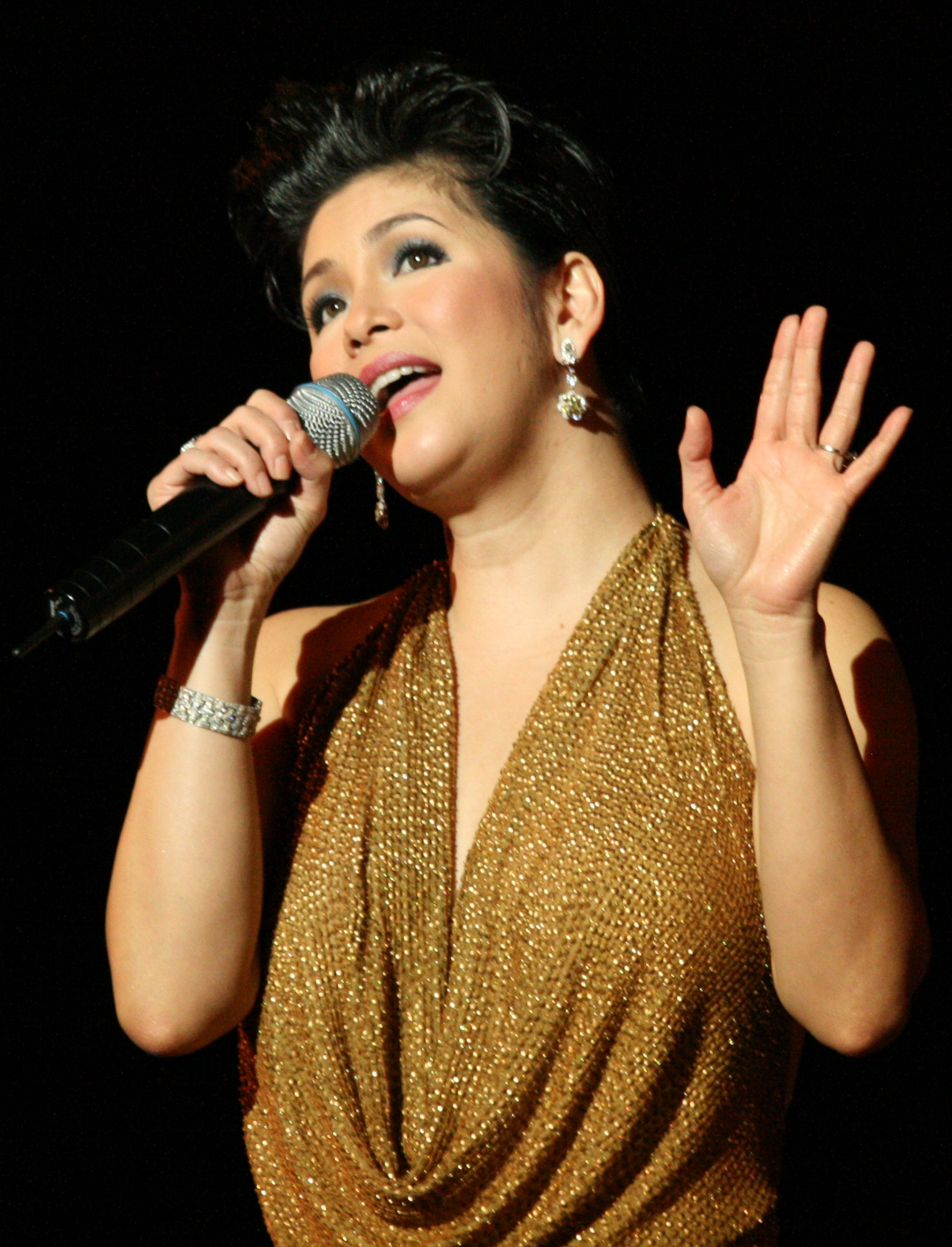
Regine Velasquez

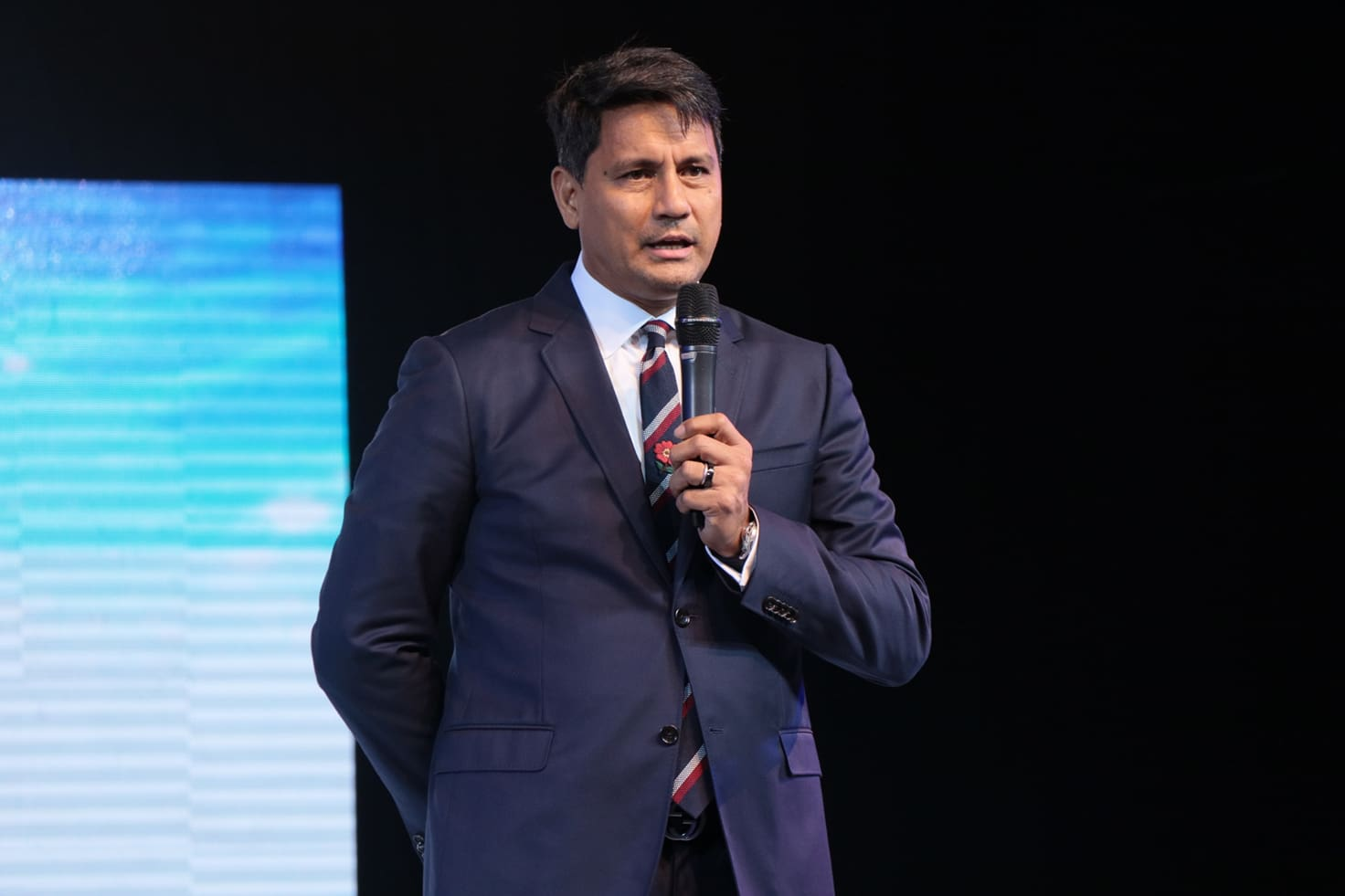
Richard Gomez

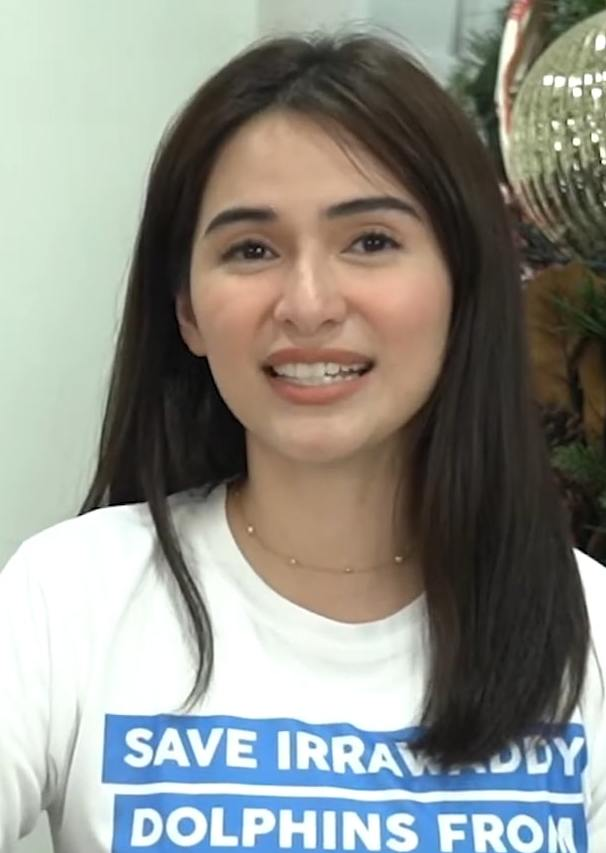
Jennylyn Mercado

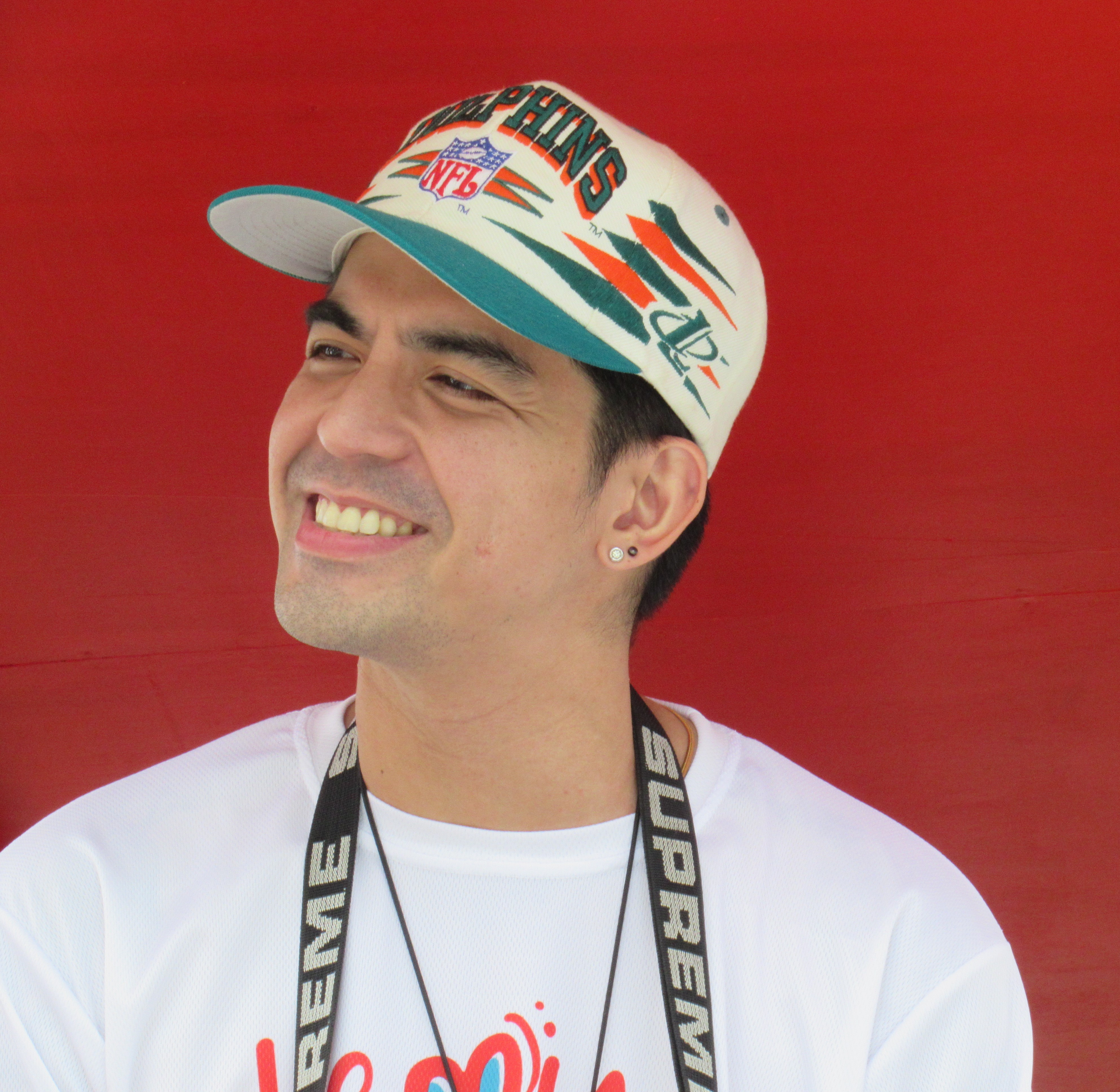
Mark Herras

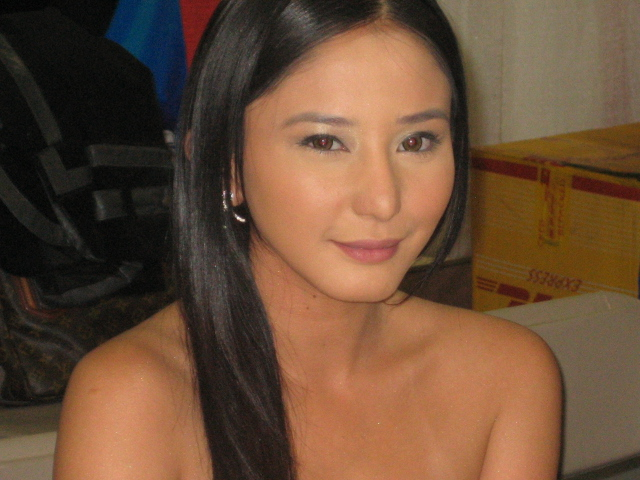
Katrina Halili

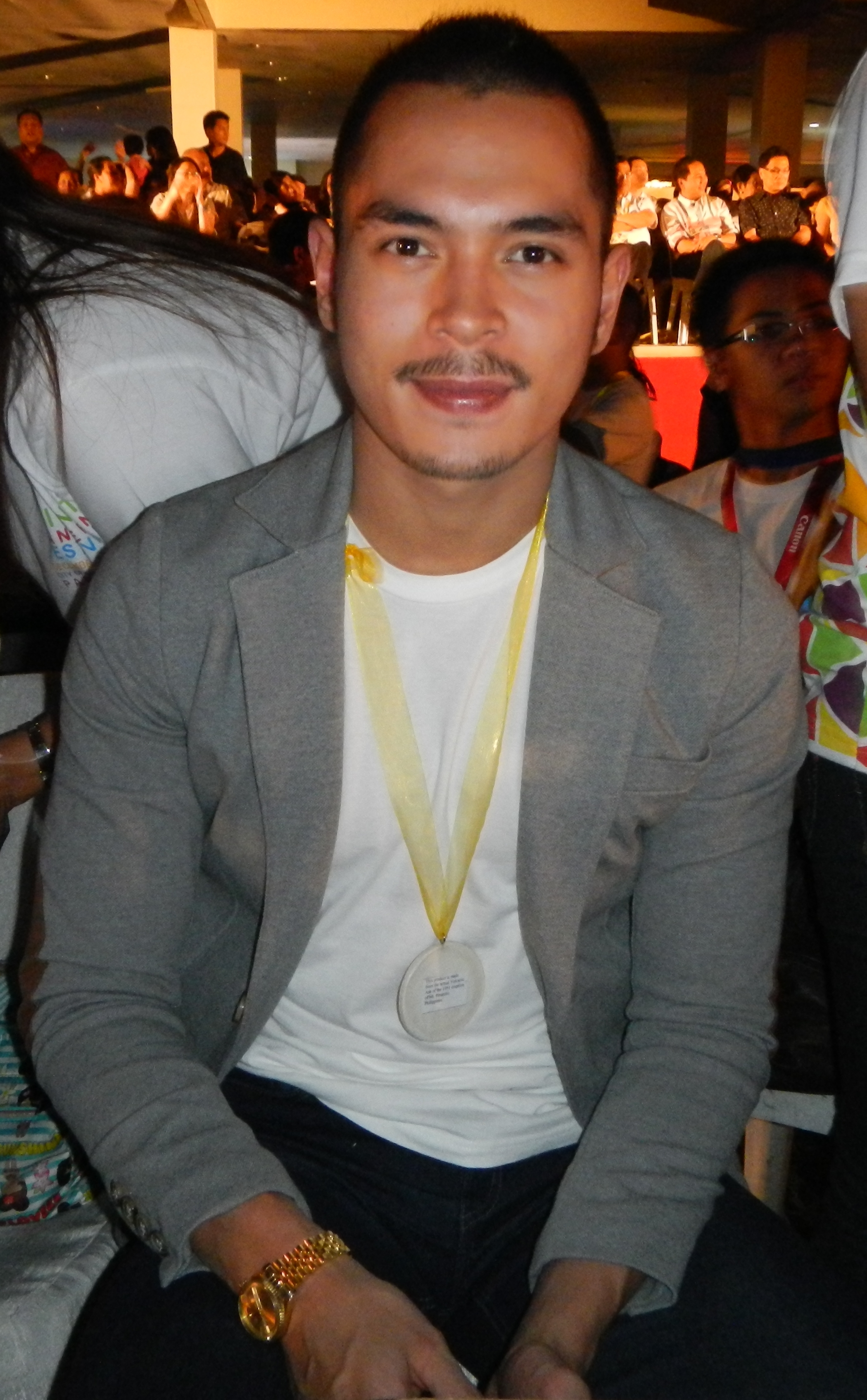
Jake Cuenca

Lead cast

- Regine Velasquez as Angeline Sagrado
- Richard Gomez as Raphael Cruzado
- Dawn Zulueta as Stella Carbonel
- Ariel Rivera as Michael Bernabe

Supporting cast

- Jennylyn Mercado as Joey Almasan
- Mark Herras as Chris Sagrado
- Freddie Webb as Alvin Sagrado
- Juan Rodrigo as Roberto Bernabe
- Pinky de Leon as Maita Sagrado
- Pinky Marquez as Ella Bernabe
- Cindy Kurleto as Elaine Guanzon
- Tonton Gutierrez as Ronald Carbonel
- Katrina Halili as Janelle Bernabe
- Gabby Eigenmann as Abet Torallba
- Janelle Jamer as Bea Atentido
- Jackie Castillejo as Citas Bernabe
- Jean Saburit as Glenda Cruzado
- Andrew Schimmer as Paolo Mendez
- Maureen Larrazabal as Vicky Abrera
- Jake Cuenca as William
- Carmi Martin as Laura Guanzon
- Krista Ranillo as Gem
- Jade Lopez as Lily
- Robert Ortega as Mike

Guest cast

- Railey Valeroso as younger Raphael
- JC de Vera as younger Michael
- Cris Daluz as Zoilo

== Accolades ==
Accolades received by Forever in My Heart
Year	Award	Category	Recipient	Result	Ref.
2005	Golden Screen TV Awards	Outstanding Director for a Drama Series	Mark Reyes Phil Noble	Nominated	
2005	Golden Screen TV Awards	Outstanding Drama Series	Forever in My Heart	Nominated	
2005	Golden Screen TV Awards	Outstanding Lead Actor in a Drama Series	Richard Gomez	Nominated	
2005	Golden Screen TV Awards	Outstanding Lead Actor in a Drama Series	Ariel Rivera	Won	
2005	Golden Screen TV Awards	Outstanding Lead Actress in a Drama Series	Regine Velasquez	Nominated	
