= A Mother's Story =

- Theatrical movie poster
- Directed by: John-D J. Lazatin
- Written by: Senedy Que
- Produced by: Olivia de Jesus; Rafael Lopez; Charo Santos-Concio
- Starring: Pokwang; Xyriel Manabat; Rayver Cruz
- Cinematography: Shayne Q. Sarte
- Edited by: Mitos Briones
- Music by: Fred Ferraz
- Production company: The Filipino Channel
- Distributed by: Star Cinema
- Release dates: November 6, 2011 (United States); January 8, 2012 (Philippines)
- Countries: Philippines; United States
- Languages: Filipino; English
- Box office: ₱24,815,780.00

A Mother's Story is a 2011 Filipino family Independent film about Medy (Pokwang) who became an illegal immigrant in the United States and her struggles as she achieves legal status. The film deals with what the OFWs go through in the United States. This is the first film produced by The Filipino Channel and distributed by ABS-CBN International and Star Cinema.

The film had its premiere in Los Angeles on November 6, 2011. The film was released in Philippine cinemas on January 8, 2012.

== Plot ==
Medy (Pokwang) is a makeup artist living in the Philippines with her family, composed of her jobless husband (Nonie Buencamino), a son (Aaron Junatas, and later, Rayver Cruz), and an infant daughter. She regularly does the make-up of a popular concert star, who later on chose her as a personal make-up artist in a concert tour in the United States. While in America, she met her former classmate Helen (Beth Tamayo), who convinced Medy to stay in the country to be an illegal migrant worker. She decides to take Helen's offer, in hopes that working abroad will bring the prosperity her family seeks.

Following her friend's suggestions, Medy works as a front desk operator at a children's drama studio. Medy quickly becomes a natural at her job, becoming a favorite among students, particularly with a young girl named Cherry. When Medy learns that her earnings are not enough to cover the medicine for her sick daughter Queenie (Xyriel Manabat), she follows Helen's suggestion to work as a stay-in housekeeper for a couple who work as lawyers.

While working for the couple, Medy endures verbal and physical abuse. She is also barred from contact with her family in the Philippines, with the couple going so far as confiscating her passport from her, so she cannot leave. Medy endures the hardship in hopes of a better life for her family, and with the help of Cherry, the student in the dance studio who turned out to be the couple's daughter. Medy also has Helen, whom she trusts to send her earnings and other gifts to her family.

After seven years, Medy decides to finally leave the abusive couple, thanks to Cherry, who takes pity on her and illicitly gives her passport back, without her parents' knowledge as they were arguing that night. Medy then seeks legal advice from a lawyer named Atty. Michael J. Gurfinkel, who advises her that she has a strong right to file a case against the family for illegal detention, physical injuries, and hiring someone like her as an undocumented citizen. Medy also confronts Helen, when she learns that not all her earnings made it to her family.

Medy comes home to an impartial family reunion. She finds out that her husband is seeing another woman, leaving her children in her mother's care, Choleng. While her daughter is grateful to finally meet her, her son feels betrayed by a mother who left her to fend for themselves. Medy files for an annulment.

When Medy tells her family about the hardships she endured in the United States, her family finally understands her. Medy also receives a phone call from Atty. Gurfinkel stating that she won the case against the abusive couple who are going to jail for their crimes. Even Cherry, who loved Medy so much, also testified against her own parents for what they did to Medy. She also gains back wages and additional money from emotional distress. This piece of good news lifts Medy's spirit, and she starts to rebuild her life with her mother and her children. After a joyous Christmas celebration, King decides to go abroad just like his mom, hoping for a better future. The whole family wishes him the best of luck.

== Cast and characters ==
- Pokwang as Remedios "Medy" Santos
- Xyriel Manabat as Queenie Santos
- Rayver Cruz as King Santos
- Nonie Buencamino as Gerry Santos
- Beth Tamayo as Helen
- Ana Capri as Celia
- Jaime Fabregas as Edgar
- Aaron Junatas as Young King
- K Brosas as Neneng
- Daria Ramirez as Choleng
- Caitlin Cummings as Cherry
- Justine Dee as Juan

== Release ==
=== Distribution ===
The film was released on November 11, 2011 in 22 select cities in the United States, such as San Francisco, CA, Chicago, IL, Jacksonville, FL, Aiea, HI, Las Vegas, NV, San Diego, CA, Seattle, WA, Norfolk, VA, Houston, TX, Sacramento, CA and Bergenfield, NJ. It was also shown in Canada, United Kingdom, Spain and Italy.

An exclusive red carpet premiere night was also held in the Philippines on January 8, 2012 in TriNoma Mall, Quezon City. Star Cinema then released A Mother's Story nationwide on January 12, 2012.

=== Box office ===
A Mother's Story grossed P24,815,780 in the Philippines after two weeks of release, according to figures from Box Office Mojo.

=== Critical reception ===
The film was graded "A" by the Cinema Evaluation Board of the Philippines.

It received mixed to positive reviews from local film critics. Abby Mendoza of Philippine Entertainment Portal praised Pokwang's "heartfelt" performance.

On the other hand, Philbert Dy of Clickthecity.com liked the film's first half, but disliked the second half.
