= Carmi Martin =

Filipina actress

- Born: Carmita Martin; August 9, 1963 (age 63); Santa Ana, Manila, Philippines
- Education: CAP College Foundation
- Occupations: Actress, model, comedian
- Years active: 1976–present
- Known for: Tonight with Dick and Carmi; The Better Half; Four Sisters and a Wedding

Carmita Martin (born August 9, 1963) is a Filipino actress, model, and comedian.

Martin has acted in many film and TV projects over the years. In 1997, she did a Primetime drama Ikaw Na Sana as Barbara an iconic TV Villain on the GMA Network and Viva Television produced series that spanned a film version. She reached new audiences in the 2010s and 2020s with roles in the films In the Name of Love, No Other Woman, Working Girls, and Four Sisters and a Wedding. In 2017, she returned to a television role with ABS-CBN in The Better Half. In 2018, Martin starred in Since I Met You, and in 2022 joined the sitcom Happy ToGetHer with John Lloyd Cruz.

== Career ==
Martin first appeared in 1980 in Dolphy's Angels with Liz Alindogan, Anna Marie Gutierrez, Yehlen Catral and the late comedy king Dolphy. She worked on more movies with Dolphy, including Stariray, The Quick Brown Fox, John en Marsha, Dancing Master, Dino Dinero, and Father & Son. Her last movie with Dolphy was Dobol Trobol with Vic Sotto in 2008.

Martin became a mainstay of the comedy sitcoms Chicks to Chicks in 1980 on IBC-13 until its transfer to ABS-CBN 2 in 1986, along with Abangan ang Sususnod na Kabanata. She had a weekly drama anthology entitled Carmi on BBC Two, directed by Soxy Topacio from 1985 to 1986, where she portrayed various characters and acted with other thespians. She also had a variety show with Roderick Paulate on Channel 2 (1986–87), Tonight with Dick and Carmi. One film that showed her acting prowess was Hot Property, directed by National Artist Lino Brocka as an entry to the 1983 Metro Manila Film Festival.

Martin has featured in many film dramas, including Cain at Abel (1982); Laruan (1983); Bayan Ko: Kapit sa Patalim (1985) and Bagong Hari (1986). She has also played many comedy roles, such as the funny other woman in Andres de Saya (1982); the tactless office employee in Working Girls (1984); the disorganized but demanding woman in Sa Totoo Lang (1985); the sexy PE teacher in Ma'am, May We Go Out (1985) and the wacky stepmother in When I Fall in Love (1986).

In 2018, Martin starred in the ABS-CBN movie, Since I Found You. In 2022, she joined the sitcom Happy ToGetHer with John Lloyd Cruz, with whom she also starred in the ABS-CBN Primetime Soap Ikaw ang Lahat sa Akin. In 2023, Martin starred in Ten Little Mistresses, the first Filipino-produced film to be launched on Amazon Prime Video.

== Personal life ==
Martin took a two-year certificate course at the Philippine School of Interior Design in 2003, and in 2011 graduated in Fine Arts at the Philippine Women's University.

== Filmography ==
=== Film ===
Year	Title	Role
1980	Dolphy's Angels	Marlene
1980	John & Marsha 80	
1980	The Quick Brown Fox	
1980	Iskul Bukol Freshmen	
1981	Stariray	
1981	Mahinhin vs. Mahinhin	Stella
1981	Mr. One-Two-Three Part 2	
1981	D' Gradwets	
1982	For Y'ur Height Only	Marilyn
1982	Cain and Abel	Cita
1982	Andres de Saya 2: Mabagsik Na Daw!	Viviana Nabalute
1983	Hot Property	
1983	Tulume Alyas Zorro	Blanquita
1984	Working Girls	Suzanne Galang
1984	Lovingly Yours: The Movie	Elaine Solis
1985	This Is My Country	Carla
1985	Bomba Arienda	Carol
1985	Ma'am May We Go Out	Ms. Dibdiban
1986	Bagong Hari	
1987	Walang Karugtong ang Nakaraan	Lucy
1988	I Love You 3x a Day	Grace Samson
1989	Gabriela	Gabriela
1990	Dino Dinero	Charlotte
1991	Humanap Ka ng Panget	Fifi
1995	Father & Son	Vicky
1997	To Saudi with Love	
1998	Ikaw Na Sana: The Movie	Barbara
1999	Labs Ko Si Babe	Violy Pagsisisihan-Escallon
2000	Kahit Isang Saglit	
2003	Message Sent	
2004	I Will Survive	Belinda
2007	Paraiso: Tatlong Kwento Ng Pag-asa	Diday
2008	Dobol Trobol: Lets Get Redi 2 Rambol!	Gabriela "Gabbi"
2009	OMG (Oh, My Girl!)	Inday Langging
2010	Working Girls	Suzanne Galang Cavendah
2011	No Other Woman	Babygirl Dela Costa
2011	In the Name of Love	Chloe Evelino
2012	The Healing	Bles
2012	The Mistress	Marion Alfonso
2013	The Bride and the Lover	Josephine Paredes
2013	Four Sisters and a Wedding	Jeanette Bayag / Salarzara
2014	Sa Ngalan ng Ama, Ina, at mga Anak	Cindy
2014	Beauty in a Bottle	Miss Santy
2014	Feng Shui 2	Rubylyn "Ruby" Anonuevo
2015	Ex with Benefits	Bobby
2016	Love Me Tomorrow	Angelina "Angie" Monteclaro
2017	Extra Service	L
2017	Loving in Tandem	Remedios "Aling Edios" Camantigue
2017	Bes and the Beshies	Tisay
2017	Unexpectedly Yours	Helena
2017	Carlo J. Caparas' Ang Panday	Delilah
2017	Deadma Walking	Priscilla
2018	Ang Dalawang Mrs. Reyes	Amanda Reyes
2018	Harry and Patty	Belle / Myrna
2019	The Panti Sisters	Nora Panti
2019	3pol Trobol: Huli Ka Balbon!	Cristy Esguerra
2022	My Teacher	Mrs. Mission
2023	Ten Little Mistresses	Magenta
2025	Sosyal Climbers	Madeline Montecillo
2025	Everything About My Wife	Mrs. Brizuela
2025	Mudrasta: Ang Beking Ina!	Melancio Antonio / May Anne
2025	Call Me Mother	Mila de Jesus

=== Television ===
Year	Title	Role
1976–1984	Student Canteen	Co-host
1984–1991	Chicks to Chicks / Chika Chika Chicks	
1987–1996	That's Entertainment	Tuesday Group Member
1988–1991	Tonight with Dick & Carmi	Host / Performer
1991–1997	Abangan Ang Susunod Na Kabanata	Clara
1996	Oki Doki Doc	Lyn
1997–1998	Ikaw na Sana	Barbara Rosales Juico
1999–2000	Liwanag ng Hatinggabi	
1999–2000	Labs Ko Si Babe	Viola Pagsisihan-Escallon
2001	Eto Na Ang Susunod Na Kabanata	Clara
2001–2002	Ikaw Lang ang Mamahalin	Beatrice Madrigal
2002	Kahit Kailan	Dolce Vita
2002–2003	Berks	Javie's mother
2003	Sa Dulo ng Walang Hanggan	Dra. Aquino
2003–2004	Buttercup	Angela
2004–2005	Forever in My Heart	Laura Guanzon
2005	Love To Love: Wish Upon A Jar	
2005	Ikaw ang Lahat sa Akin	Yolanda Gerochi-Fontanilla
2006	Your Song: Forever's Not Enough	
2006	I Luv NY	Diane Young
2006	Love Spell: Charm & Crystal	
2006	Komiks Presents: Da Adventures of Pedro Penduko	Aling Violy
2007	Maalaala Mo Kaya: Traffic Light	
2007–2008	Mars Ravelo's Lastikman	Dolores Puntawe
2008	Ako si Kim Samsoon	Roció Ruiz
2008	Obra: Sintoy	Lead Role
2008–2010	Everybody Hapi	Ursula Pulgado
2009	Carlo J. Caparas' Ang Babaeng Hinugot sa Aking Tadyang	Hera Alcaraz
2009	Jim Fernandez's Kambal Sa Uma	Lolita Dela Riva
2009–2010	Katorse	Yvonne Wenceslao
2010	First Time	Real Ms. Dimaculangan
2010	Love Bug: Say I Do	Chona
2010–2011	Beauty Queen	Leavida Acuesta-Rivas
2010–2011	My Driver Sweet Lover	Ms. Horinda
2011	My Lover, My Wife	Dra. Charity Romero
2011	Magic Palayok	Alina Ledesma
2012	Spooky Nights: Korona	Oria
2012	Broken Vow	Rosanna Sebastian
2012	Regal Shocker: Aparador	Sor. Gemma
2012	Luna Blanca	Divine Alvarez-Buenaluz (Older version)
2012	Makapiling Kang Muli	Helga
2013	Unforgettable	Consuelo "Concha" De Ocampo
2013	One Day, Isang Araw: Gamer Girl	Angelina
2013–2014	Prinsesa ng Buhay Ko	Eliza Montes-Grande
2014	Moon of Desire	Soledad Ricafrente
2014–2016	Ismol Family	Apolonia "Mama Apple" Laqui
2015	Maalaala Mo Kaya: Kamay	Connie
2015	Magpakailanman: Masuwerteng Pinay Sa Brunei	Sylvia
2015–2016	Marimar	Tía Esperanza Aldama
2016	Magpakailanman: Ang kriminal na binuhay ng Diyos	Fely
2016	That's My Amboy	Maria Gregoria "Marissa" Tapang-Santos
2016	Dear Uge: Barangayan	Mercy
2016	Karelasyon: Nagmumurang Kamatis	Doris
2016	Dear Uge: Paano Mapansin Ni Crush?	Emily
2017	The Better Half	Mayor Dyna "Mayora" Soriano
2017	Wansapanataym: Amazing Ving	Sofronia "Momshie Soffy" Cristobal / Maskarada
2018	Brush	Dra. Volla
2018	Since I Found You	Regina "Mama Reg" Cobarrubias
2018–2019	FPJ's Ang Probinsyano	Margarita "Margie" Corona†
2019	Dear Uge: Oh My Single Ladies	Luisa
2019	Home Sweetie Home: Extra Sweet	Manuela Montes
2020	Ipaglaban Mo: Budol	Anita
2020	Tadhana: Salisi Part 1 / 2	Mabel
2021	Hoy, Love You!	Elizabeth
2021	Wish Ko Lang!: Biyenan	Maritess
2021–2022	Happy ToGetHer	Crispina "Pining" Y. Rodriguez
2022	Love You Stranger	Patricia "Patty" Salazar
2023-2024	Walang Matigas na Pulis sa Matinik na Misis	Lucita "Lucing" Dallego
2024	Ang Himala ni Niño: Unang Libro ng Niña Niño	Madam Chona / Charity Biglangtubo
2025	Maka	
2025	Rainbow Rumble	Contestant
2026	Cruz vs Cruz	Mayor Hermie Constancio
2026	My Bespren Emman	Naomi
2026	Sigabo	Isobel Jacinto
