= Cristine Reyes =

Filipino actress, model, and dancer (born 1989)

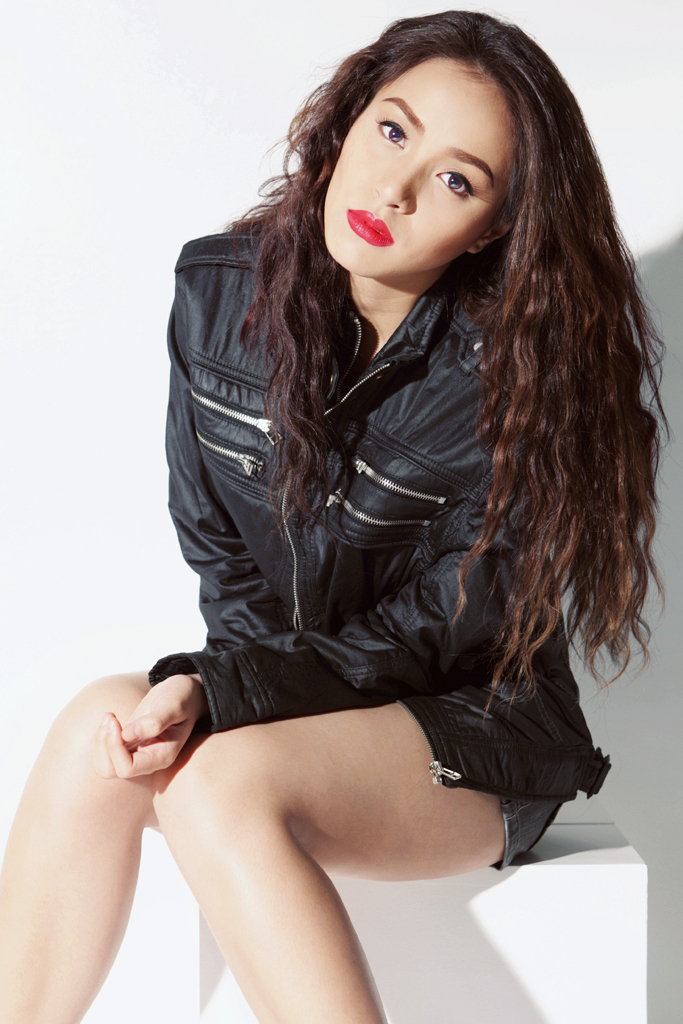
- Reyes in 2011
- Born: Amina Klenk Amirul; February 5, 1989 (age 37); Marikina, Metro Manila, Philippines
- Other name: Cris Murla
- Occupations: Actress; model; dancer
- Years active: 2003–present
- Agent: Viva Artists Agency (2008–present)
- Spouse: Ali Khatibi (m. 2016; ann. 2023)
- Children: 1
- Relatives: Ara Mina (half-sister)

Cristine Reyes (born Amina Klenk Amirul; February 5, 1989) is a Filipino actress, model, and dancer. Dubbed the "Ultimate Star" by local media, her films have collectively earned over ₱1.05 billion, making her one of the highest-grossing Filipino film stars of the 21st century.

She has appeared in several commercially successful films including No Other Woman (₱278 million), Seven Sundays (₱271 million), Bromance: My Brother's Romance (₱163 million), The Gifted (₱110 million), and Ang Darling Kong Aswang (₱100 million).

== Career ==
=== Film and television ===
Reyes' on-camera career began when she was a finalist in the first season of GMA Network's reality talent show StarStruck. She later appeared in several GMA Network scripted series, including Mulawin (2004), Darna (2005), and Marimar (2007).

In 2008, she moved to rival network ABS-CBN, where she took on more mature roles in television series such as Eva Fonda (2008) and Tubig at Langis (2016). In 2009, Reyes appeared in the horror film Patient X.

Reyes' transition into film began in 2011 with No Other Woman, where she portrayed a betrayed wife opposite Anne Curtis and Derek Ramsay. The film became one of the highest-grossing Filipino films of the year. Recognized as one of the "New Drama Royalty" of her generation, Reyes won the Box Office Queen award alongside Anne Curtis at the 43rd Guillermo Mendoza Memorial Scholarship Foundation's (GMMSF) Box Office Entertainment Awards. Reyes received four FAMAS Award nominations, including three for Best Actress. In 2020, she won Best Actress at the 40th Oporto International Film Festival for her performance in the psychological thriller Untrue (2019).

In 2020, following the ABS-CBN network shutdown, Reyes returned to GMA Network.

In 2022, Reyes portrayed Imee Marcos in the historical drama Maid in Malacañang. She reprised the role in the 2023 sequel, Martyr or Murderer.

In 2024, she reappeared on the former ABS-CBN time slot, this time in the show It's Showtime, which was broadcast simultaneously across All TV, Kapamilya Channel, A2Z, GMA, and GTV. Since then, she has also worked on projects for TV5 following its renewed partnership with Viva.

Reyes' film career is managed by Viva Films.

=== Media ===
In 2009, Reyes was named FHM Philippines "Sexiest Woman in the World" in 2009, beating Marian Rivera, Katrina Halili, and Angel Locsin. That same year, she was listed in FHM's Top 25 Sexiest Women of the Decade.

== Personal life and education ==
Reyes discussed her adoption with Karen Davila on March 20, 2024, explaining that her mother had to leave for the United States, entrusting her children to others. She also discussed her relationship with her biological father, a Muslim from Tawi-Tawi, whom she visited in Zamboanga before his death in 2022.

Reyes dated actor Dennis Trillo from 2007 to 2009 and Rayver Cruz from 2011 to 2012. She was briefly linked to Derek Ramsay in 2013 and has also been associated with Joross Gamboa, Keempee de Leon, and Mark Herras.

Reyes gave birth to her daughter, Amarah, with mixed martial artist Ali Khatibi on February 8, 2015. The couple got engaged on September 14, 2015, and were married in a private ceremony on January 27, 2016, on Balesin Island, Polillo, Quezon. They separated in 2019.

Reyes and Marco Gumabao dated from January 2023 to 2024.

In 2024, Reyes earned a certificate in public administration from the UP National College of Public Administration and Governance.

In 2026, Reyes became engaged to Gio Tingson, a former Akbayan partylist and National Youth Commission chair.

== Filmography ==
=== Film ===
| Year | Title | Role |
|---|---|---|
| 2004 | Beautiful Life | Kim |
| 2004 | Pa-Siyam | Janelle |
| 2005 | Say That You Love Me | Janine |
| 2006 | Mourning Girls | Bianca |
| 2006 | Apoy sa Dibdib ng Samar | |
| 2006 | Barang | Olga |
| 2006 | Pitong Dalagita | Romie |
| 2007 | Green Paradise | Cristina |
| 2007 | Enteng Kabisote 4 | Cameo Role |
| 2008 | Ate | Cleoh |
| 2009 | Patient X | Guada |
| 2009 | Ang Darling Kong Aswang | Eliza Santos / Darling |
| 2010 | Working Girls | Wendy Casuga |
| 2011 | Tumbok | Grace |
| 2011 | No Other Woman | Charmaine Dela Costa-Escaler |
| 2012 | The Reunion | Ara |
| 2012 | El Presidente | Hilaria Aguinaldo |
| 2013 | Bromance: My Brother's Romance | Erika |
| 2013 | When the Love is Gone | Cassandra "Cassie" |
| 2013 | Girl, Boy, Bakla, Tomboy | Liza |
| 2014 | Trophy Wife | Lani |
| 2014 | The Gifted | Aica Tabayoyong / Maica |
| 2016 | Lumayo Ka Nga sa Akin | Marie / Mharilyn |
| 2016 | Elemento | Kara |
| 2017 | Spirit of the Glass 2: The Haunted | Bea |
| 2017 | Seven Sundays | Cha Bonifacio |
| 2018 | Abay Babes | Ruby |
| 2019 | Maria | Lily / Maria |
| 2019 | UnTrue | Mara Villanueva |
| 2022 | Maid in Malacañang | Imee Marcos |
| 2022 | Wedding Dress | Joan |
| 2023 | Martyr or Murderer | Imee Marcos |
| 2023 | Kidnap for Romance | Elena |
| 2024 | Dearly Beloved | Shel |
| 2024 | The Kingdom | Dayang Matimyas |

=== Television ===
| Year | Title | Role |
|---|---|---|
| 2003 | StarStruck | Herself / Contestant |
| 2004 | Click | Vanessa |
| 2004 | Hanggang Kailan | Hana |
| 2004 | SOP Gigsters | Herself / Performer |
| 2004 | Love To Love: Pretty Boy | |
| 2004 | Mulawin | Estrella |
| 2005 | Love to Love: Miss Match | |
| 2005 | Mars Ravelo's Darna | Molecula |
| 2006 | Mars Ravelo's Captain Barbell | Jennifer |
| 2007 | SOP Rules | Herself / Performer |
| 2007 | Super Twins | Magnesia |
| 2007 | Fantastic Man | Kate / Screamer / Vampire girl |
| 2007 | MariMar | Kim Chan |
| 2008–present | ASAP | Herself / Performer |
| 2008 | Wowowee | Guest co-host |
| 2008 | Maalaala Mo Kaya: Larawan | Liwayway / Rosie |
| 2008 | Kahit Isang Saglit | Alona Mondragon |
| 2008 | Maalaala Mo Kaya: Sulo | Jean Maranan |
| 2008 | Banana Split | Herself |
| 2008 | Eva Fonda | Eva Fonda / Eva De Jesus |
| 2009 | May Bukas Pa | Cheska |
| 2009 | Precious Hearts Romances Presents: The Bud Brothers | Georgina "Georgie" Yulo |
| 2009 | Your Song Presents: Babalik Kang Muli | Stella Salcedo |
| 2009 | Precious Hearts Romances Presents: My Cheating Heart | Nadine Zapanta |
| 2010 | Precious Hearts Romances Presents: Kristine | Kristine Jewel Fortalejo |
| 2010 | Wansapanataym: Kokak | Cara Cruz |
| 2011 | Maalaala Mo Kaya: Piano | Andrea |
| 2011 | Reputasyon | Agnes Delos Santos |
| 2012 | Dahil sa Pag-ibig | Jasmin Valderama |
| 2012 | Toda Max | Joy Maligaya |
| 2012 | Wansapanataym: Ang Monito Ni Monica | Monica Natividad |
| 2013 | Bukas na Lang Kita Mamahalin | Amanda Suarez-Dizon |
| 2013–14 | Honesto | Marie Olivarez |
| 2016 | Tubig at Langis | Irene Magdangal-Villadolid |
| 2017 | Ipaglaban Mo: Takas | Karen |
| 2018 | Ipaglaban Mo: Bitin | April |
| 2018 | Precious Hearts Romances Presents: Los Bastardos | Young Soledad De Jesus-Cardinal |
| 2019 | Nang Ngumiti ang Langit | Katrina Salvador |
| 2020 | Eat Bulaga! | Herself / Guest / Contestant |
| 2020 | Masked Singer Pilipinas | Herself / Judge |
| 2021 | Encounter | Selene Cristobal |
| 2023 | Minsan pa Nating Hagkan ang Nakaraan | Helen Bautista-Aurelio |
| 2024 | Family Feud | Herself / StarStruck 1 reunion |
| 2024 | It's Showtime | Herself / Guest / Performer |
| 2026 | Sigabo | Belinda Magtibay |

== Discography ==
=== Soundtrack ===
- "Nang Dahil sa Pag-ibig" from Dahil sa Pag-Ibig (2012) (composed by Tootsie Guevara)

=== Albums ===
- Cristine (2010)

== Awards and nominations ==
| Year | Award-Giving Body | Category | Work | Result |
|---|---|---|---|---|
| 2004 | 18th PMPC Star Awards for TV | Best New Female TV Personality | Stage 1: The StarStruck Playhouse / Stage 1: My First Romance | Nominated |
| 2009 | Seoul International Drama Awards | Best Actress | Eva Fonda | Nominated |
| 2009 | 23rd PMPC Star Awards for Television | Best Drama Actress | Eva Fonda | Nominated |
| 2009 | ASAP Pop Viewers' Choice Awards 2009 | Pop Cover Girl | Herself | Nominated |
| 2009 | 35th Metro Manila Film Festival | Best Festival Actress | Ang Darling Kong Aswang | Nominated |
| 2010 | ASAP Pop Viewers' Choice Awards 2010 | Pop Cover Girl | Herself | Nominated |
| 2010 | ASAP Pop Viewers' Choice Awards 2010 | Pop Celebrity Cameo Role | Rico Blanco's "Ayos" | Nominated |
| 2011 | Yahoo! Philippines OMG! Awards | Breakthrough Female Artist | —N/a | Won |
| 2011 | ASAP Pop Viewers' Choice Awards 2011 | Pop Cover Girl | Herself | Nominated |
| 2012 | GMMSF Box-Office Entertainment Awards | Box-Office Queens (with Anne Curtis) | No Other Woman | Won |
| 2012 | Yahoo! Philippines OMG! Awards | Actress of the Year | No Other Woman | Nominated |
| 2012 | 60th FAMAS Awards | Best Actress | No Other Woman | Nominated |
| 2013 | 61st FAMAS Awards | Best Actress | El Presidente | Nominated |
| 2017 | 66th FAMAS Awards | Best Supporting Actress | Seven Sundays | Nominated |

== Special awards and recognition ==
=== Rankings ===
| Year | Organization | Category | Rank |
|---|---|---|---|
| 2008 | FHM Philippines | Philippines 100 Sexiest Women | #8 |
| 2009 | FHM Philippines | Philippines 100 Sexiest Women | #1 |
| 2010 | FHM Philippines | Philippines 100 Sexiest Women | #3 |
| 2011 | FHM Philippines | Philippines 100 Sexiest Women | #4 |
| 2012 | FHM Philippines | Philippines 100 Sexiest Women | #4 |
| 2013 | FHM Philippines | Philippines 100 Sexiest Women | #5 |
| 2014 | FHM Philippines | Philippines 100 Sexiest Women | #5 |
| 2015 | FHM Philippines | Philippines 100 Sexiest Women | — |
| 2016 | FHM Philippines | Philippines 100 Sexiest Women | #36 |
| 2017 | FHM Philippines | Philippines 100 Sexiest Women | #46 |
