= Ruel S. Bayani =

Filipino film and television director and producer (born 1969)

- Born: July 7, 1969 (age 57); Cabanatuan City, Nueva Ecija, Philippines
- Occupations: Film and television director, producer
- Notable work: One More Try, Kasal, No Other Woman, Paano na Kaya, Maalaala Mo Kaya

Ruel S. Bayani is a Filipino film and television director and producer, originally from Cabanatuan City, Nueva Ecija. He is best known for directing box-office hits such as One More Try (2012), No Other Woman (2011), and Kasal (2018), as well as for his work on the long-running drama anthology Maalaala Mo Kaya and the romance film Paano na Kaya (2010).

== Career ==
Bayani gained widespread recognition for directing the highly successful romantic drama One More Try, one of the official entries in the 38th Metro Manila Film Festival, which won Best Picture and earned multiple acting awards.

Among his other notable motion pictures are:

- No Other Woman (2011) – a box-office success.
- Kasal (2018) – critically acclaimed, nominated for Best Director and Best Picture at the 21st Gawad Pasado Awards.
- Paano na Kaya (2010) – a romantic drama starring Kim Chiu and Gerald Anderson that was screened internationally.

On television, Bayani is recognized for directing numerous episodes of ABS-CBN's Maalaala Mo Kaya (MMK).

In 2024, Bayani was featured in an ABS-CBN International Sales article highlighting his role in shaping the future of Philippine entertainment, particularly in global content distribution and international collaborations.

== Awards and recognition ==
- Nominated for Best Director for One More Try at the 38th Metro Manila Film Festival and other award-giving bodies, including FAMAS and Star Awards.
- Kasal received critical acclaim and multiple nominations—including Best Director and Best Picture at Gawad Pasado Awards.
- Anak ng Cabanatuan Award (2012), alongside fellow awardees Kathryn Bernardo and Japoy Lizardo, in recognition of his achievements in the entertainment industry.
