= List of Bea Alonzo performances =

Filipino actress filmography and discography

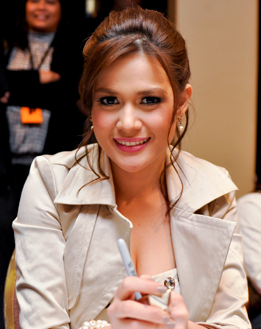
Alonzo during the Star Magic tour in 2010

Bea Alonzo is a Filipino actress who made her screen debut in the 2002 teen series K2BU. At the age of 15, she had her breakthrough role as a lawyer in the drama series Kay Tagal Kang Hinintay (2002), for which she received her first Star Awards for Best Actress nomination. The following year, Alonzo made her film debut in the romantic comedy My First Romance alongside John Lloyd Cruz. She co-starred with Cruz in a string of releases, including the romantic dramas Now That I Have You (2004), All About Love (2006), and Close to You (2006). They both had starring roles in the television series It Might Be You (2003), Ikaw ang Lahat sa Akin (2005), and Maging Sino Ka Man (2006). She then played Jinkee Pacquiao opposite Jericho Rosales in the Joel Lamangan-directed biographical drama Pacquiao: The Movie (2006).

Alonzo received critical acclaim for her role as Basha, a woman in a loveless and controlling relationship in the romantic drama One More Chance (2007), which earned her nominations at the FAMAS and Luna Awards for Best Actress. The following year, she played the titular character in the comedy series I Love Betty La Fea (2008), based on the Colombian telenovela Yo soy Betty, la fea. In 2010, she portrayed Corazon Aquino, the first female president of the Philippines, in the anthology series Maalaala Mo Kaya. During this period, Alonzo appeared in several television projects; she played a fashion designer in Magkaribal (2010), a woman seeking answers for her fiancé's death in Guns and Roses (2011), and an heiress in A Beautiful Affair (2012). She received Star Award nominations for Best Actress for her performances as an adulteress torn between her lover and his son in the drama The Mistress (2012), and as one of the siblings attempting to thwart her brother from getting married in the ensemble film Four Sisters and a Wedding (2013).

For her portrayal of dual roles in the revenge drama series Sana Bukas pa ang Kahapon (2014), Alonzo won the KBP Golden Dove Award for Best Actress. In 2015, she reprised her role as Basha in the sequel A Second Chance, her highest-grossing release, for which she won the Star Award for Best Actress. She went on to play a young stepmother in the family drama series A Love to Last (2017), appeared opposite Aga Muhlach in Paul Soriano's romance drama First Love (2018), and starred in the horror thriller Eerie (2019). She will play leading roles in the adaptations of the South Korean series Start-Up and the South Korean romantic drama A Moment to Remember.

== Film ==
Bea Alonzo's film credits with year of release, film titles and roles
Year	Title	Role	Notes	Ref(s)
2003	My First Romance	Bianca		
2004	Now That I Have You	Betsy Rallos		
2005	Dreamboy	Cyd		
2006	All About Love	Lia		
2006	Pacquiao: The Movie	Jinkee Pacquiao		
2006	Close to You	Marian		
2007	One More Chance	Basha Eugenio		
2009	And I Love You So	Lara Cruz		
2010	Miss You like Crazy	Mia Samonte		
2010	Sa 'yo Lamang	Dianne Alvero		
2011	Pak! Pak! My Dr. Kwak!	Cielo Delos Santos		
2012	The Mistress	Sari Alfonso		
2012	24/7 in Love	Belle Gonzales		
2013	Four Sisters and a Wedding	Bobbie Salazar		
2013	Bromance: My Brother's Romance	Unnamed	Cameo	
2013	She's the One	Cat Aguinaldo		
2015	The Love Affair	Adie Valiente		
2015	A Second Chance	Basha Eugenio		
2016	Love Me Tomorrow	Patricia Morales	Special Participation	
2016	How to Be Yours	Anj		
2018	Kasal	Lia Marquez		
2018	First Love	Allison Castillo		
2019	Eerie	Pat Consolacion		
2019	Unbreakable	Mariel Salvador		
2020	Fan Girl	Herself	Cameo	
2020	Four Sisters Before the Wedding	Bobbie Salazar	Cameo	
2021	One True Pair The Movie	Gela	Jollibee Studios	
2023	1521	Diwata		

== Television ==
Bea Alonzo's film credits with year of release, film titles and roles
Year	Title	Role	Notes	Ref.
2002	K2BU	Dianne		
2002—2003	Kay Tagal Kang Hinintay	Katrina Argos		
2003	Maalaala Mo Kaya	—	Episode: "Lapis"	
2003	Wansapanataym	Weng	Episode: "Magic Beauty Box"	
2003—2004	It Might Be You	Cielo San Carlos		
2005	Ikaw ang Lahat sa Akin	Jasmin Cruz-Fontanilla / Daisy		
2006	Star Magic Presents	Monica	Episode: "Miss... Mistress"	
2006	Komiks	Hilda	Episode: "Kamay ni Hilda"	
2006—2008	Your Song (TV series)	Various roles	Episode: "You Win The Game"	
2006—2008	Your Song (TV series)	Various roles	Episode: "Ok Lang"	
2006—2008	Your Song (TV series)	Various roles	Episode: "Tayong Dalawa"	
2006—2007	Maalaala Mo Kaya	Heny	Episode: "Rosas"	
2006—2007	Maalaala Mo Kaya	Mayor Lina Bagasina	Episode: "Palaisdan"	
2006—2007	Maalaala Mo Kaya	Camille	Episode: "Barko"	
2006—2007	Maging Sino Ka Man	Jackie Madrigal		
2007—2008	Maging Sino Ka Man: Ang Pagbabalik	Jackie Madrigal		
2008	Maalaala Mo Kaya	Adela	Episode: "Card"	
2008	Mellow Myx	Celebrity VJ		
2008	My Myx	Celebrity VJ		
2008	Myxilog	Celebrity VJ		
2008	Pop Myx	Celebrity VJ		
2008—2009	I Love Betty La Fea	Beatriz Pengson		
2009	May Bukas Pa	Sara		
2009	Your Song	Melissa	Episode: "Someone to Love"	
2010	Maalaala Mo Kaya	Corazon Aquino	Episodes: "Kalapati" and "Makinilya"	
2010	Magkaribal	Angela Abella / Gelai Agustin		
2011	Guns and Roses	Reign Santana		
2011	Maalaala Mo Kaya	Knoll	Episode: "Kwintas"	
2012	TodaMax	Sasi		
2012—2013	A Beautiful Affair	Genevieve "Gen" Saavedra		
2014	Sana Bukas pa ang Kahapon	Rose Buenavista-Salvador / Emmanuelle Gaspar-Romero		
2017	A Love to Last	Andrea "Andeng" Agoncillo-Noble		
2019	Kadenang Ginto	Unnamed	Cameo	
2021	Bubble Gang	Herself	Guest	
2022	Start-Up PH	Danica Sison		
2022	Magpakailanman	Lezlie	Episode: "The Haunted Soul"	
2023	Pepito Manaloto: Tuloy ang Kuwento	Barbie		
2023	Battle of the Judges	Herself	Judge	
2023	Love Before Sunrise	Stella Domingo-Vibal		
2024	Magpakailanman	Kath Basa	Episode : "Always In My Mind"	
2024—2025	Widows' War	Samantha "Sam" Castillo-Palacios		
2025	Magpakailanman	Fe	Episode: "The Healer Wife"	
2026	Whispers from Heaven	Celestine		

== Discography ==
Title	Details
The Real Me	Released: 2008; Format: CD; Label: Star Music
