= List of awards and nominations received by Bea Alonzo =

Bea Alonzo awards and nominations
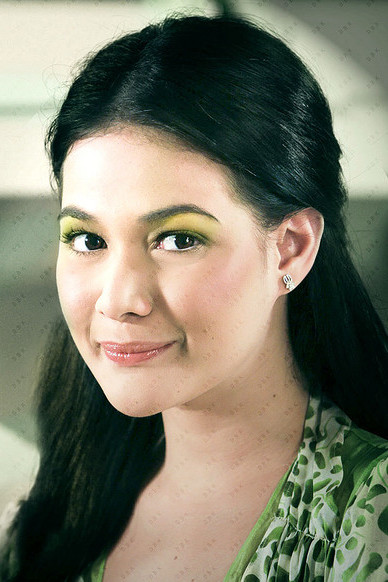
- Alonzo in 2009
Awards and nominations
Award	Wins	Nominations

Totals (Note: Certain award groups do not simply award one winner. They acknowledge several different recipients, have runners-up, and have third place. Since this is a specific recognition and is different from losing an award, runner-up mentions are considered wins in this award tally. For simplification and to avoid errors, each award in this list has been presumed to have had a prior nomination.)
- Wins: 19
- Nominations: 29

Filipina-British actress Bea Alonzo is dubbed as the Television and Movie Queen of her generation. In her 25 years in the entertainment industry, Alonzo has received several awards including five Gawad Pasado Awards, four Box Office Entertainment Awards, two FAMAS Awards, two PMPC Star Awards for Movies, one PMPC Star Awards for Television, one KBP Golden Dove Award and one Luna Award including nominations from Golden Screen Movie Awards and Golden Screen Television Awards.

Internationally, she received the Asian Star Up Next Award at the 4th International Film Festival Awards Macao (IFFAM).

== Awards and nominations ==
Awards and nominations received by Marian Rivera
Organization	Year	Category	Work	Result	Ref.
Box Office Entertainment Awards	2008	Box Office Queen	One More Chance	Won	
Box Office Entertainment Awards	2011	Film Best Actress of the Year	Miss You like Crazy	Won	
Box Office Entertainment Awards	2013	Box Office Queen	The Mistress	Won	
Box Office Entertainment Awards	2016	Phenomenal Box Office Star	A Second Chance	Won	
EdukCircle	2016	Most Influential Film Actress of the Year	Herself	Won	
EdukCircle	2019	Most Influential Film Actress of the Year	Herself	Included	
EdukCircle	2020	10th Most Influential Celebrities of the Decade	Herself	Included	
FAMAS Award	2008	Best Actress	One More Chance	Nominated	
FAMAS Award	2011	Best Actress	Miss You Like Crazy	Nominated	
FAMAS Award	2013	Best Actress	The Mistress	Nominated	
FAMAS Award	2014	Best Actress	Four Sisters and a Wedding	Nominated	
FAMAS Award	2016	Best Actress	A Second Chance	Nominated	
FAMAS Award	2016	Best Actress	The Love Affair	Nominated	
Film Development Council of the Philippines	2019	Leading Lady of the Century (Luminaries of Philippine Cinema)	Herself	Won	
Film Development Council of the Philippines	2020	Film Ambassador's Night; Special Citation	4th International Film Festival & Awards	Won	
Fil-Am Visionary Awards	2008	Outstanding Performance by an Actress	One More Chance	Won	
Gawad Lassalianeta	2022	Most Outstanding Actress in a Drama Series	Start-Up PH	Nominated}	
Gawad Genio Awards	2016	Best Actress	A Second Chance	Won	
Golden Globe Royal Achievements Awards	2022	Best Television Actress	Start-Up PH	Won	
Gawad PASADO Awards	2010	PinakaPASADOng Aktres	And I Love You So	Won	
Gawad PASADO Awards	2011	PinakaPASADOng Katuwang na Aktres	Sa 'yo Lamang	Won	
Gawad PASADO Awards	2014	PinakaPASADOng Katuwang na Aktres	Four Sisters and a Wedding	Won	
Gawad PASADO Awards	2016	PinakaPASADOng Aktres	A Second Chance	Won	
Gawad PASADO Awards	2016	PinakaPASADOng Aktres	The Love Affair	Nominated	
Gawad PASADO Awards	2017	PinakaPASADOng Aktres	How to Be Yours	Nominated	
Gawad PASADO Awards	2019	PinakaPASADOng Aktres	Kasal	Won	
Golden Screen Movie Awards (ENPRESS)	2005	Best Performance by an Actress on a Leading Role (Musical or Comedy)	Now That I Have You	Nominated	
Golden Screen Movie Awards (ENPRESS)	2010	Best Performance by an Actress on a Leading Role (Drama)	And I Love You So	Nominated	
Golden Screen Movie Awards (ENPRESS)	2011	Best Performance by an Actress on a Leading Role (Drama)	Sa 'yo Lamang	Nominated	
Golden Screen Movie Awards (ENPRESS)	2013	Best Performance by an Actress on a Leading Role (Drama)	The Mistress	Nominated	
Golden Screen Movie Awards (ENPRESS)	2014	Best Performance by an Actress in a Leading Role (Musical or Comedy)	Four Sisters and a Wedding	Nominated	
Golden Screen TV Awards (ENPRESS)	2005	Outstanding Lead Actress in a Drama Series	Ikaw ang Lahat sa Akin	Nominated	
Golden Screen TV Awards (ENPRESS)	2014	Outstanding Performance by an Actress in a Drama Series	A Beautiful Affair	Nominated	
Golden Screen TV Awards (ENPRESS)	2015	Outstanding Performance by an Actress in a Drama Program	Sana Bukas Pa ang Kahapon	Nominated	
International Film Festival and Awards Macao (IFFA)	2019	Asians Stars Up Next Awards	Herself	Won	
KBP Golden Dove Awards	2015	Best TV Actress	Sana Bukas Pa ang Kahapon	Won	
Laguna Excellence Awards	2019	Outstanding Film Actress of the Year	Kasal	Won	
Luna Awards (FAP)	2008	Best Actress	One More Chance	Nominated	
Luna Awards (FAP)	2013	Best Actress	The Mistress	Nominated	
Luna Awards (FAP)	2016	Best Actress	The Love Affair	Won	
MTRCB TV Awards	2009	Best Actress	I Love Betty La Fea	Won	
PMPC Star Awards for Movies	2004	Best New Movie Actress	My First Romance	Won	
PMPC Star Awards for Movies	2008	Movie Actress of the Year	One More Chance	Nominated	
PMPC Star Awards for Movies	2011	Movie Actress of the Year	Sa 'yo Lamang	Nominated	
PMPC Star Awards for Movies	2013	Movie Actress of the Year	The Mistress	Nominated	
PMPC Star Awards for Movies	2014	Movie Actress of the Year	Four Sisters and a Wedding	Nominated	
PMPC Star Awards for Movies	2016	Movie Actress of the Year	A Second Chance	Won	
PMPC Star Awards for Television	2003	Best Drama Actress	Kay Tagal Kang Hinintay	Nominated	
PMPC Star Awards for Television	2004	Best Drama Actress	It Might Be You	Nominated	
PMPC Star Awards for Television	2007	Best Drama Actress	Maging Sino Ka Man	Nominated	
PMPC Star Awards for Television	2011	Best Drama Actress	Magkaribal	Nominated	
PMPC Star Awards for Television	2014	Best Drama Actress	Sana Bukas Pa ang Kahapon	Nominated	
PMPC Star Awards for Television	2017	Best Drama Actress	A Love to Last	Nominated	
PMPC Star Awards for Television	2019	TV Queens at the Turn of the Millennium.	Herself	Won	
PMPC Star Awards for Television	2025	Best Drama Actress	Widows' War	Nominated	
PMPC Star Awards for Television	2025	Best Single Performance by an Actress	Magpakailanman: Always in my Mind	Nominated	
USTv Students Choice Awards	2007	Best Drama Actress	Maging Sino Ka Man	Won	

=== Listicles ===
Name of publisher, name of listicle, year and result
Publisher	Year	Listicle	Result	Ref.
Variety	2019	Asians Stars: Up Next	Placed	

=== FHM rankings ===
Year	Award	Category	Result	Won by
2003	FHM Philippines	100 Sexiest Woman In The World	Ranked # 84	Diana Zubiri
2004	FHM Philippines	100 Sexiest Woman In The World	Ranked # 36	Cindy Kurleto
2005	FHM Philippines	100 Sexiest Woman In The World	Ranked # 58	Angel Locsin
2006	FHM Philippines	100 Sexiest Woman In The World	Ranked # 92	Katrina Halili
2007	FHM Philippines	100 Sexiest Woman In The World	Ranked # 16	Katrina Halili (2)
2008	FHM Philippines	100 Sexiest Woman In The World	Ranked # 16	Marian Rivera
2009	FHM Philippines	100 Sexiest Woman In The World	Ranked # 33	Cristine Reyes
2010	FHM Philippines	100 Sexiest Woman In The World	Ranked # 34	Angel Locsin (2)
2011	FHM Philippines	100 Sexiest Woman In The World	Ranked # 35	Sam Pinto
2012	FHM Philippines	100 Sexiest Woman In The World	Ranked # 49	Sam Pinto (2)
2013	FHM Philippines	100 Sexiest Woman In The World	Ranked # 48	Marian Rivera (2)
2014	FHM Philippines	100 Sexiest Woman In The World	Ranked # 61	Marian Rivera (3)
2016	FHM Philippines	100 Sexiest Woman In The World	Ranked # 51	Jessy Mendiola
2017	FHM Philippines	100 Sexiest Woman In The World	Ranked # 28	Nadine Lustre
