= The Real Me =

The Real Me or Real Me may refer to:

== Television episodes ==
- "Real Me" (Buffy the Vampire Slayer)
- "The Real Me" (Sex and the City)

== Music ==
=== Albums ===
- The Real Me (Patti Austin album), 1988
- The Real Me, a 2000 album by Svala
- The Real Me (Bea Alonzo album), 2008
- The Real Me (Future album), 2026

=== Songs ===
- "The Real Me" (song), by The Who, 1973
- "Real Me", a 2025 song by Nav from OMW2 Rexdale
- "Real Me", a song by Ayumi Hamasaki from Rainbow
- "The Real Me", a song by The Eric Burdon Band from Sun Secrets
- "The Real Me", a song by Kiev Connolly & The Missing Passengers, Ireland's entry in the 1989 Eurovision Song Contest
- "The Real Me", a song by Natalie Grant from Awaken
- "The Real Me", a 2023 song by Jazz Emu

== See also ==
- Realme, a Chinese smartphone and AIoT product manufacturer
- Really Me, a 2011 Canadian teen TV sitcom
