= Davao Conyo =

Filipino internet personality (born 1991)

- Born: Phillip Te Hernandez; September 27, 1991 (age 35); Davao City, Philippines
- Citizenship: Filipino
- Occupation: Content creator
- Years active: 2017–present
- Known for: Comedy skits and dubbed videos

Phillip Te Hernandez (born September 27, 1991), known as Davao Conyo, is a Filipino content creator from Davao City. He created comedy skits and previously made dubbed videos that use a mix of English, Bisayan languages and local Davao Tagalog.

== Early life and career ==
Hernandez is from Davao City. He grew up with his mother and two sisters. He worked as a home-based virtual assistant before becoming a full-time content creator.

He began uploading videos in 2017. An early video was a dubbed and rewritten scene from the film Four Sisters and a Wedding performed in Davao Tagalog. He described himself as an introvert who fueled the extroverted Davao Conyo personality. He keeps his filming process extremely private, barring even his boyfriend from watching his works in progress.

After earning from online content, he left his job and later moved to Manila. By 2024 his accounts on Facebook, TikTok, Instagram, and YouTube had several million followers in total. He maintains a private personal life, working independently.

== Content ==
Hernandez’s skits focuses on a "Dabawenyos" dialect with language mismashing Tagalog, Bisaya and English. The content and his stage name play on the tension between different languages, such as the word Conyo being a vulgar term in Spanish. His skits focus on real life situations and relatable characters. His videos feature multiple personas with different tones to reflect social quirks.

In December 2024 he declined a request to create a parody related to a public controversy. He stated that making fun of a person who is going through a difficult situation for the purpose of gaining views is "lazy and malicious".
