= Janus del Prado =

Filipino actor and comedian

- Born: Janus Renato Robles Mateo III; 19 November 1984 (age 41); Manila, Philippines
- Occupations: Actor, Matinee Idol
- Years active: 1992–present
- Agent: Star Magic (2000–2021)
- Parent(s): Renato del Prado; Amelia Robles

Janus Renato Robles Mateo III (born 19 November 1984), better known by his screen name Janus del Prado, is a Filipino actor. He is a former talent of Star Magic.

== Early life ==
He is the youngest son of veteran action star Renato del Prado and actress Amelia Robles.

== Career ==
He started in showbusiness at age of 5 doing bit roles. His mother refused to use his father's influence in the industry to get in so she trained him herself and his other two siblings to act and regularly brings them to auditions. He has been in the industry since 1990 and has done a variety of roles. Despite the popular belief that he was a member of 1992 variety/gag show Ang TV, he was not. He auditioned a bunch of times but never got cast. Some of his movies are Pulis Probinsya, Pulis Probinsya 2, Magic Kingdom: Ang Alamat ng Damortis, One More Chance, Catch Me, I'm in Love, Pagpag: Siyam na Buhay, A Second Chance, How to Be Yours, and TV shows are G-mik, Qpids, Lobo, Batang X, Green Rose, Bridges of Love, The Story of Us, Ang Bagong Pamilya ni Ponching, to name a few.

Following the closure of ABS-CBN Channel 2 on May 5, 2020, Janus returned to GMA Channel 7 for his comeback kapuso project after his last GMA 7 show was a youth oriented drama series Hanggang Kailan in 2004, and also his 1st sitcom entitled Happy Together with fellow matinee idol and actor John Lloyd Cruz, former Goin Bulilit actors Miles Ocampo & Vito Quizon, former Dick & Carmi Host Carmi Martin, former PBB Housemate Jayson Gainza, former Your Face Sounds Familiar Philippines Contestant Eric Nicholas, model & comedian Ashley Rivera, actress Jenzel Angeles, former Kalokalike Contestant Wally Waley, and former Banana Split cast member comedian host Kuya Jobert Austria.

== Filmography ==
=== Film ===
Year	Title	Role
1992	Lucio Margallo	Son of Goyena
1995	Batang-X	Control
1995	Victim No. 1: Delia Maga (Jesus, Pray for Us!) – A Massacre in Singapore	
1995	Omar Abdullah: Pulis Probinsiya 2, Tapusin na Natin ang Laban	Jamil
1996	Lab en Kisses	Kaloy
1997	Magic Kingdom: Ang Alamat ng Damortis	Oman
1998	Sa Piling ng Aswang	
1999	Peque Gallaga's Scorpio Nights 2	Cicero
2001	Yamashita: The Tiger's Treasure	Omar
2003	Till There Was You	Damon Boborol
2006	D' Lucky Ones	Macoy
2006	Shake, Rattle and Roll 8	Jun
2007	My Kuya's Wedding	Colin
2007	One More Chance	Chinno Marquez
2008	My Big Love	Lito
2008	Shake, Rattle & Roll X	Dennis
2008	My Only Ü	Ngorks
2009	Ang Tanging Pamilya: A Marry Go Round	Jestoni Sicat
2010	Noy	Boy
2010	White House	Omar
2010	I Do	Bernard
2011	Catch Me, I'm in Love	Dan
2012	Every Breath U Take	Boy
2012	The Reunion	Hwemington
2013	Must Be... Love	Gordo
2013	Four Sisters and a Wedding	Godofredo "Frodo" Teodoro
2013	Pagpag: Siyam na Buhay	Dencio
2014	She's Dating the Gangster	Bus Ticket Vendor
2015	A Second Chance	Chinno Marquez
2016	How to Be Yours	Ryan
2016	Ang Bagong Pamilya ni Ponching	Ponching
2017	Extra Service	Pacquito Mondragon
2017	Can't Help Falling in Love	William Charles
2018	My Perfect You	Handres
2018	Pinay Beauty	

=== Television ===
Year	Title	Role
1995–1996	Kadenang Kristal	various
1996	Bayani	Sajid Bulig
1996–1997	Lyra	Macoy
1999	Maynila	Various
2000-2002	G-mik	Epoy
2002	Tabing Ilog	Donald Mac
2003–2004	Math-Tinik	Host
2004	Hanggang Kailan	Lito
2004–2005	Krystala	Adur
2005	Qpids	Himself
2005	Spirits	Bughaw
2006	Your Song Presents: Panalangin	Carlo
2006	Da Adventures of Pedro Penduko	Berting
2006	Maalaala Mo Kaya: Langis	Various
2006	Bituing Walang Ningning	Jack
2007	Maalaala Mo Kaya: Pilat	Mayong
2007	Komiks Presents: Pedro Penduko at ang mga Engkantao	Doy
2008	Maalaala Mo Kaya: Singsing	Young Panyong
2008	Lobo	Choy
2008–2009	Carlo J. Caparas' Pieta	Boyong
2009	Maalaala Mo Kaya: Taxi	Jake
2009	Precious Hearts Romances Presents: Ang Lalaking Nagmahal sa Akin	Dominador "Dina" Magpantay
2009	The Singing Bee	Contestant-Winner
2010	Precious Hearts Romances Presents: My Cheating Heart	Crisanto
2010	Rubi	Wayne
2011	Green Rose	Johnson Bayoran
2011	Maalaala Mo Kaya: Piano	Led
2011	It's Showtime	Himself/Judge
2011	Guns and Roses	Vincent Bartolome
2011	Maalaala Mo Kaya: Tumba-Tumba	Toto
2011	Wansapanataym: Cocoy Shokoy	
2012	Maalaala Mo Kaya: Ensaymada	Robert
2012	Oka2kat	Harold
2012	Maalaala Mo Kaya: Polo Shirt	Bonsai
2012	Wansapanataym: Si Jing-jing at ang Giant Baging	Rocky
2012	A Beautiful Affair	Fred Macatangay
2013	Bukas na Lang Kita Mamahalin	Elvis
2014	The Legal Wife	Bradley
2014	Ipaglaban Mo: Ibigay Ang Aming Karapatan	Episode Guest
2015	Sabado Badoo	Cameo Footage Featured
2015	Bridges of Love	Muloy Angeles
2016	The Story of Us	Ruben Garcia
2016	FPJ's Ang Probinsyano	Allan dela Paz/Jonel
2019–2020	Starla	Boyong
2021–2022	He's Into Her	Boyet del Valle
2021–2023	Happy Together	T.G.
2023–2024	Black Rider	Miguelito Sanchez
2025	Sanggang-Dikit FR	Brando "Daga" Salazar

== Awards and nominations ==
Year	Award giving body	Category	Nominated work	Results
2003	17th PMPC Star Awards for TV	Best Children Show Host (shared with Kristoffer Eursoses and Hue Remulla)	Math-Tinik	Nominated
2004	18th PMPC Star Awards for TV	Best Children Show Host (shared with Kristoffer Eursoses and Hue Remulla)	Math-Tinik	Nominated
2013	39th Metro Manila Film Festival	Best Supporting Actor	Pagpag: Siyam na Buhay	Nominated
