= Bea Alonzo =

Filipino actress (born 1987)

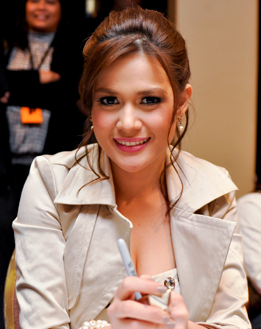
- Alonzo during a Star Magic tour in 2010
- Born: Phylbert Angelli Ranollo Fagestrom; October 17, 1987 (age 39); Cainta, Rizal, Philippines
- Citizenship: Philippines; United Kingdom
- Occupation: Actress
- Years active: 2002–present
- Works: Full list
- Spouse: Vincent Co (m. 2026)
- Relatives: Lucio Co (father-in-law)
- Awards: Full list

Phylbert Angelli Escalante Ranollo-Co (born Phylbert Angelli Ranollo Fagestrom; October 17, 1987), known professionally as Bea Alonzo, is a Filipino actress. She is best known for her starring roles in romantic comedy and romance drama films, including One More Chance (2007), The Mistress (2012), Four Sisters and a Wedding (2013), A Second Chance (2015) and The Love Affair (2015). Alonzo's films have grossed ₱3.15 billion (more than US$50 million), making her one of the highest-grossing Filipino box office stars of all time.

In television, her most prolific roles include Jacqueline "Jackie" Madrigal-Roxas on Maging Sino Ka Man (2006–2007) and its sequel Maging Sino Ka Man: Ang Pagbabalik (2007–2008), the titular character on I Love Betty La Fea (2008–2009), Angela "Gelai" Agustin / Angela Abella on Magkaribal (2010), and Genevieve "Gen" Saavedra on A Beautiful Affair (2012–2013). She later starred on Start-Up PH (2022), the Philippine adaptation of the South Korean series of the same name, Love Before Sunrise (2023), and on Widow's War (2024–2025).

== Early life ==
Alonzo was born Phylbert Angelli Ranollo Fagestrom on October 17, 1987 in Cainta, Rizal, Philippines, is the daughter of Mary Anne Escalante Ranollo and Philip Fagestrom. Alonzo's father is British. Her parents are separated, and she has a younger brother on her maternal side.

== Career ==
=== 2002–2006: Early breakthrough ===
In 2002, Alonzo debuted as a teen actress in K2BU, and quickly rose to fame with John Lloyd Cruz through the romantic television series Kay Tagal Kang Hinintay and It Might Be You.

Bea Alonzo and Cruz then starred in a string of successful romantic films, such as My First Romance in 2003, Now That I Have You in 2004, All About Love and Close to You in 2006. She also portrayed Jinkee Pacquiao in the 2006 biographical film Pacquiao: The Movie.

In television, the pair appeared in star-studded series, such as Ikaw ang Lahat sa Akin in 2005 and Maging Sino Ka Man from 2006 to 2007.

=== 2007–2011: One More Chance and romantic leading lady ===
In 2007, Alonzo and Cruz starred in the romantic film One More Chance, directed by Cathy Garcia-Sampana. The film was a critical and commercial success, as it grossed over ₱150 million and earned Alonzo the Box-Office Queen Award at the 38th Box Office Entertainment Awards. Her performance received multiple Best Actress nominations, including of those from FAMAS, Luna Awards, and Star Awards for Movies.

In 2008, Alonzo released her debut album The Real Me under Star Records. She also portrayed the titular role in the Philippine adaptation of I Love Betty La Fea.

In 2009, Alonzo starred in the romantic film And I Love You So opposite Derek Ramsay and Sam Milby.

In 2010, Alonzo reunited with Cruz in the romantic film Miss You like Crazy. The film earned ₱143 million and earned Alonzo the Movie Actress of the Year at the 42nd Box-Office Entertainment Awards. She also headlined the revenge series Magkaribal alongside Gretchen Barretto, and appeared in the family drama film Sa ‘Yo Lamang.

In 2011, Alonzo starred in the comedy film Pak! Pak! My Dr. Kwak! opposite Vic Sotto. She also led the action series Guns and Roses with Robin Padilla.

=== 2012–2020: Established actress ===
In 2012, Alonzo starred in the Olivia Lamasan romantic drama film The Mistress, opposite Cruz. The film grossed over ₱260 million and her performance received critical acclaim. The pair also returned to television through A Beautiful Affair. Alonzo then appeared with Zanjoe Marudo in the romantic comedy ensemble film 24/7 in Love.

In 2013, Alonzo starred in two box-office hits: the family comedy drama film Four Sisters and a Wedding, which grossed ₱145 million; and the romantic drama film She's the One, which grossed ₱137 million.

In 2014, Alonzo portrayed a dual role in the hit television series Sana Bukas Pa ang Kahapon with Paulo Avelino.

In 2015, Alonzo starred in her two most successful films. She teamed up with Dawn Zulueta and Richard Gomez for The Love Affair. The film earned ₱320 million, making it the second Filipino film to surpass ₱300 million box-office gross. She then paired up with Cruz for A Second Chance, the sequel to the 2007 One More Chance. The film briefly became the highest grossing Filipino film of all time after earning ₱556 million.

In 2016, Alonzo starred in the romantic film How to Be Yours with Gerald Anderson.

In 2017, Alonzo starred in the romantic family drama series A Love to Last with Ian Veneracion.

In 2018, Alonzo starred in the romantic drama film Kasal with Ramsey and Avelino. The film achieved commercial success after grossing ₱200 million. She also paired up with Aga Muhlach in the romantic drama film First Love. The film grossed over ₱90 million.

In 2019, Alonzo starred in her first horror film Eerie with Charo Santos-Concio. The film earned ₱210 million. She closed the decade with the drama film Unbreakable with Angelica Panganiban. The film earned ₱120 million. She also started pursuing writing for film by enrolling in the writing workshop of Philippine screenwriter, journalist, novelist, and playwright Ricky Lee. Alonzo was also included in the lists of Variety and the International Film Festival & Awards Macao as among Asia's biggest stars poised for international stardom.

In 2020, she had cameo roles in the coming of age film Fan Girl as a fictionalized version of herself and in Four Sisters Before the Wedding as Bobbie, reprising her role from the 2013 film.

=== 2021–present: Move to GMA Network ===
In 2021, Alonzo transferred to GMA Network as she signed an exclusive contract with the network after almost 19 years with ABS-CBN. Her first acting project with GMA Network is the 2022 television series Start-Up PH alongside Alden Richards, which is the Philippine adaptation of the 2020 Korean drama of the same name starring Bae Suzy and Nam Joo-hyuk.

In 2023, Alonzo starred alongside Dennis Trillo in the Viu original series Love Before Sunrise, a partnership with GMA Network. In 2024–2025, Alonzo starred in the hit murder series Widow's War alongside Carla Abellana.

== Other ventures ==
=== Business ===
Alonzo has owned several businesses including Beati Farm in Iba, Zambales, and BASH Manila, a lifestyle brand which sells luggages, bags and travel essentials.

In 2019, she became a franchise owner of Dean and DeLuca, a cafe and bakery business in Quezon City.

== Personal life ==
In 2022, Alonzo invested more than €500,000 (about ₱30 million) in an apartment in Madrid, Spain. As a result, she was given permanent resident privileges in the country, which extends to her mother. However, she clarified that she does not plan to obtain Spanish citizenship.

Alonzo was in a relationship with late actor Miko Palanca, her co-star on K2BU and It Might Be You, until 2008. Having met in 2002, Palanca had courted her for four years before becoming a couple. Alonzo later dated actors Jake Cuenca, Zanjoe Marudo, and Gerald Anderson. In an interview, she revealed that the breakup with Anderson in 2019 was due to him "ghosting" her, as well as allegations of infidelity involving actress Julia Barretto. She further stated that she felt hurt by his actions, particularly the gaslighting she experienced during their relationship.

On July 18, 2023, Alonzo announced her engagement to actor Dominic Roque. However, the couple confirmed the end of their relationship with a joint Instagram post on February 11, 2024.

It was later revealed in June 2025 that Alonzo was in a relationship with Vincent Co, the president of Puregold. They planned to travel to Spain for their civil ceremony in May 2026, which was eventually canceled. They were married in a civil ceremony at the Makati City Hall, officiated by Mayor Nancy Binay on July 13, 2026.

=== Legal issues ===
In May 2024, Alonzo filed three cyber libel complaints at the Quezon City Prosecutors Office against showbiz columnists and online hosts Cristy Fermin and Ogie Diaz, their co-hosts in their respective online programs and an online basher who is pretending to be close to her, involving “false, malicious, and damaging” reports of her alleged tax evasion.

The following month, Alonzo's former driver, Efren Torres Delos Reyes filed with the DOLE's National Labor Relations Commission a labor case against her for wrongful dismissal, abuse, maltreatment, harassment and lack of separation pay. Her lawyer, Joey Garcia, alleged that the case is tainted with malice.

=== Health ===
In 2023, Alonzo revealed in her vlog on YouTube, that she had polyendocrine metabolic ovarian syndrome (PMOS) and hypothyroidism, which caused her to gain a little more weight.

== Filmography ==
Film

- My First Romance (2003)
- Now That I Have You (2004)
- All About Love (2006)
- Pacquiao: The Movie (2006)
- Close to You (2006)
- One More Chance (2007)
- And I Love You So (2009)
- Miss You like Crazy (2010)
- The Mistress (2012)
- Four Sisters and a Wedding (2013)
- Bromance: My Brother's Romance (2013)
- She's the One (2013)
- The Love Affair (2015)
- A Second Chance (2015)
- Love Me Tomorrow (2016)
- How to Be Yours (2016)
- Kasal (2018)
- First Love (2018)
- Eerie (2018)
- Unbreakable (2019)
- Fan Girl (2020)
- Four Sisters Before the Wedding (2020)

Television series

- Kay Tagal Kang Hinintay (2002–2003)
- It Might Be You (2003–2004)
- Ikaw ang Lahat sa Akin (2005)
- Komiks (2006)
- Maging Sino Ka Man (2006–2007)
- Maging Sino Ka Man: Ang Pagbabalik (2007–2008)
- I Love Betty La Fea (2008–2009)
- Your Song (2009)
- Magkaribal (2010)
- Guns and Roces (2011)
- A Beautiful Affair (2012–2013)
- Sana Bukas Pa ang Kahapon (2014)
- A Love to Last (2017)
- Kadenang Ginto (2019)
- Start-Up PH (2022)
- Love Before Sunrise (2023)
- Widows' War (2024–2025)
- Whispers from Heaven (2026)

== Awards and nominations ==
=== Film ===
Year	Work	Association	Category	Result	Source
2005	Now That I Have You	ENPRESS Golden Screen Awards	Best Performance by an Actress in a Leading Role (Musical or Comedy)	Nominated	
2008	One More Chance	Fil-am Visionary Awards	Outstanding Performance (Actress)	Won	
2008	One More Chance	FAMAS Awards	Best Actress	Nominated	
2008	One More Chance	PMPC Star Awards for Movies	Movie Actress of the Year	Nominated	
2009	One More Chance	Luna Awards	Best Actress	Nominated	
2010	And I Love You So	ENPRESS Golden Screen Awards	Best Performance by an Actress in a Leading Role (Drama)	Nominated	
2011	Miss You Like Crazy	Box Office Entertainment Awards	Film Actress of the Year	Won	
2011	Miss You Like Crazy	FAMAS Awards	Best Actress	Nominated	
2011	Sa 'Yo Lamang	ENPRESS Golden Screen Awards	Best Performance by an Actress in a Leading Role (Drama)	Nominated	
2011	Sa 'Yo Lamang	PMPC Star Awards for Movies	Movie Actress of the Year	Nominated	
2013	The Mistress	ENPRESS Golden Screen Awards	Best Performance by an Actress in a Lead Role (Drama)	Nominated	
2013	The Mistress	PMPC Star Awards for Movies	Movie Actress of the Year	Nominated	
2013	The Mistress	Yahoo! OMG! Awards	Actress of the Year	Nominated	
2013	The Mistress	Box Office Entertainment Awards	Box Office Queen	Won	
2013	The Mistress	FAMAS Awards	Best Actress	Nominated	
2013	The Mistress	Luna Awards	Best Actress	Nominated	
2014	Four Sisters and a Wedding	ENPRESS Golden Screen Awards	Best Performance by an Actress in a Lead Role (Musical or Comedy)	Nominated	
2014	Four Sisters and a Wedding	FAMAS Awards	Best Actress	Nominated	
2014	Four Sisters and a Wedding	PMPC Star Awards for Movies	Movie Actress of the Year	Nominated	
2015	A Second Chance	Box Office Entertainment Awards	Phenomenal Box-Office Star of 2016	Won	
2015	A Second Chance	PMPC Star Awards for Movies	Movie Actress of the Year	Won	
2015	A Second Chance	FAMAS Awards	Best Actress	Nominated	
2015	The Love Affair	Luna Awards	Best Actress	Won	
2015	The Love Affair	FAMAS Awards	Best Actress	Nominated	
2019	Unbreakable				

=== Television ===
Year	Work	Association	Category	Result	Source
2003	Kay Tagal Kang Hinintay	PMPC Star Awards for Television	Best Drama Actress	Nominated	
2004	It Might Be You	PMPC Star Awards for Television	Best Drama Actress	Nominated	
2005	Ikaw ang Lahat sa Akin	ENPRESS Golden Screen Entertainment TV Awards	Outstanding Lead Actress in a Drama Series	Nominated	
2006	Ikaw ang Lahat sa Akin	PMPC Star Awards for Television	Best Drama Actress	Nominated	
2007	Maging Sino Ka Man	PMPC Star Awards for Television	Best Drama Actress	Nominated	
2009	I Love Betty La Fea	MTRCB TV Awards	Best Actress	Won	
2011	Magkaribal	PMPC Star Awards for Television	Best Drama Actress	Nominated	
2013	A Beautiful Affair	Yahoo OMG! Awards	Actress of the Year	Nominated	
2014	A Beautiful Affair	ENPRESS Golden Screen TV Awards	Outstanding Performance by an Actress in a Drama Series	Nominated	
2014	Sana Bukas pa ang Kahapon	PMPC Star Awards for Television	Best Drama Actress	Nominated	
2015	Sana Bukas pa ang Kahapon	ENPRESS Golden Screen TV Awards	Outstanding Performance by an Actress in a Drama Program	Nominated	
2015	Sana Bukas pa ang Kahapon	KBP Golden Dove Awards	Best TV Actress	Won	
2017	A Love to Last	PMPC Star Awards for Television	Best Drama Actress	Nominated	
2022	Start-Up PH	Golden Globe Royal Achievement Awards 2022	Best TV Actress of the Year	Won	
2022	Start-Up PH	VP Choice Awards 2022	TV Actress of the Year	Nominated	
2025	Love Before Sunrise	37th PMPC Star Awards for Television	Best Drama Actress	Nominated	
2025	Widows' War	38th PMPC Star Awards for Television	Best Drama Actress	Nominated	
2025	Magpakailanman	38th PMPC Star Awards for Television	Best Single Performance by an Actress	Nominated	

=== Other awards ===
Year	Work	Award	Category	Result	Source
2006	—N/a	ANAK TV Seal Awards	Top 10 Most Well Liked Female Personality	Included	
2016	—N/a	ANAK TV Seal Awards	AnakTV Makabata Award	Included	
2017	—N/a	ANAK TV Seal Awards	Makabata Star Award	Won	
2018	—N/a	People of the Year Awards	People of the Year	Included	
2018	—N/a	People of the Year Awards	Volvo "Ironmark" Award	Won	
2024	—	GMA Gala 2024	Hall of Fame Awardee	Won	
