= Lui Villaruz =

Filipino actor and television host

- Occupations: Actor, television host
- Years active: 1996–present

Lui Villaruz is a Filipino actor and television host.

== Filmography ==
=== Film ===
| Year | Title | Role | Notes | Source |
|---|---|---|---|---|
| 2004 | Now That I Have You | Martin | | |
| 2011 | Shake, Rattle & Roll 13 | Class adviser | Segment: "Parola" | |

=== Television ===
| Year | Title | Role | Notes | Source |
|---|---|---|---|---|
| 1998 | Maalaala Mo Kaya | | Episode: "Egg Cell / Obaryo" | |
| 2000 | Maalaala Mo Kaya | JJ | Episode: "Paragos" | |
| 2002–2007 | Magandang Umaga, Pilipinas | Himself – Host | Winner – PMPC Star Awards for Television for Best Morning Show Host (with Julius Babao, Christine Bersola-Babao, Bernadette Sembrano, Cheryl Cosim, Kim Atienza, Anthony Taberna, Renee Salud, Marc Logan, Aida Gonzales, Winnie Cordero, and Ogie Diaz) | |
| 2003–2004 | It Might Be You | Ivory | | |
| 2006 | Team Explorer | Himself – Host | | |
| 2006–2008 | Travel Time | Himself – Host | | |
| 2016 | The Crawl | Himself – Host | Episode: "The Crawl Osaka" | |
| 2017 | Wansapanataym | | Miniseries: "Jasmin's Flower Power" | |
| 2018 | Maalaala Mo Kaya | JJ | Episode: "Magnifying Glass" | |
| 2023 | The Iron Heart | as Police Capt. | | |

== Awards and nominations ==
| Year | Work | Award | Category | Result | Source |
|---|---|---|---|---|---|
| 2006 | Travel Time | PMPC Star Awards for Television | Best Travel Show Host | Nominated | |
| 2006 | Team Explorer | PMPC Star Awards for Television | Best Travel Show Host | Nominated | |
| 2007 | Magandang Umaga, Pilipinas | PMPC Star Awards for Television | Best Morning Show Host | Won | |
| 2007 | Travel Time | PMPC Star Awards for Television | Best Travel Show Host | Nominated | |
| 2008 | Travel Time | PMPC Star Awards for Television | Best Travel Show Host | Nominated | |
