= Travel Time =

Philippine television documentary show

- Genre: Travel documentary
- Written by: Floy Quintos; Rikki Lopez
- Presented by: Susan Calo-Medina; Lui Villaruz; Manu Sandejas
- Country of origin: Philippines
- Original language: English

Original release
- Network: Intercontinental Broadcasting Corporation (1986-89); GMA Network (1989-98); Studio 23 (1998-2007); ABS-CBN News Channel (2007-15)
- Release: 1986 – 2015

Travel Time is a Philippine television travel documentary show broadcast by GMA Network and Studio 23. It premiered in 1986. The show is the longest running travel documentary show in the Philippine television. The show concluded on ANC in 2015.
