= The Mistress (2012 film) =

- Theatrical movie poster
- Directed by: Olivia Lamasan
- Screenplay by: Vanessa Valdez
- Story by: Vanessa Valdez; Olivia Lamasan
- Produced by: Charo Santos-Concio; Malou N. Santos
- Starring: John Lloyd Cruz; Bea Alonzo; Hilda Koronel; Ronaldo Valdez
- Cinematography: Hermann Claravall
- Edited by: Marya Ignacio
- Music by: Von de Guzman; Jessie Lasaten
- Production company: ABS-CBN Film Productions Inc.
- Distributed by: Star Cinema
- Release date: September 12, 2012
- Running time: 125 minutes
- Country: Philippines
- Languages: Filipino; English
- Box office: ₱262.82 million

The Mistress is a 2012 Filipino romantic melodrama film directed by Olivia Lamasan, starring John Lloyd Cruz and Bea Alonzo with Ms. Hilda Koronel and Ronaldo Valdez.

The film celebrates the 10th anniversary of John Lloyd Cruz and Bea Alonzo's partnership as a love team and also their comeback film after their hit 2010 film entitled Miss You Like Crazy.

The film was well acclaimed and received mixed to positive reviews both from critics and fans, and set a box-office record in the Philippine Cinema. It grossed over ₱260 million, becoming the highest grossing non-MMFF film of 2012 and is currently the 16th highest grossing Filipino film of all time. It also won and received six several awards (including the cast and crew) in the 31st Luna Awards and received nominations in 61st FAMAS Awards, Golden Screen Awards, and Star Awards for Movies in 2013 respectively. Due to the film's success, it was screened internationally in selected countries.

Alonzo and Cruz also had their TV series entitled A Beautiful Affair that aired in ABS-CBN last October 29, 2012, and ended on January 18, 2013, is also part of their 10th anniversary as love team and the success of The Mistress.

== Plot ==
Architect JD is troubled by his businessman father Rico never really accepting him as his son. Seamstress Sari struggles to take care of her family. The two meet by chance, and JD aggressively pursues Sari's affections. Though the two are clearly a good match, there is a problem standing in the way of their bliss: Sari is the mistress of JD's father. Against his better judgment, JD continues to court Sari even after finding out this difficult fact. He hides his true identity as Rico's son, and fights to win Sari's heart.

Upon their struggles, Rico's wife is dismayed to see Sari. When they travel to the province to deliver their client's barong tagalog, both Sari and JD finally show their true feelings for each other as they watch the wedding ceremony. Despite her relationship with JD's father, Sari finally gives in to JD's feelings and both become romantically involved as they make love.

After their travel, they are found by Rico, who is furious to see his son become close to his mistress. Rico and JD argue, ending in a fistfight as Sari tries to stop them until Rico suffers from a heart attack. At the hospital, JD finally apologizes to his dying father, and Rico appoints his son as the CEO and president, handing over their family business before he dies.

The two part ways in Rico and Sari's house, their love nest, with heavy hearts because they both know they can only love each other when they pretend.

At the end of the movie after JD delivers his speech to his father's employees about his father's life and his business, people applaud him. Then he comes to pass by the shop, stops and watches Sari as she fixes the formal suit she had sewn in the dress shop. The two see each other, make eye contact and flashback to the scene in Tuguegarao where they pretended and thought about the “what ifs”. Sari saw JD before he drove his car away, smiling at each other.

== Cast ==
- John Lloyd Cruz as Frederico "JD" / "Eric" Torres Jr.
- Bea Alonzo as Rosario "Sari" Alfonso
- Ronaldo Valdez as Frederico "Rico" Torres Sr.
- Hilda Koronel as Regina Torres
- Anita Linda as Lola Lina
- Carmi Martin as Marrion Alfonso
- Clarence Delgado as Mamon
- Tony Mabesa as Maestro Emil
- K Brosas as Rosa
- Minnie Aguilar as Olga
- Gabe Mercado as Mr. Zarate
- Nor Domingo as Brian
- Carla Humphries as Carly
- Al Gaitmatan as Arnold
- Marj Lorico as Julie
- Eileen Gonzales as Abby
- Patrick Moreno as Arvin
- Nina Guirnaldo as Guia
- Jessica Rose Ashton as Lexie
- Dustin Guia as Joey
- Karl Ernest Alano as Aljo
- Joel Molina as Alex

== Production ==
=== Background ===
The film was first announced by Star Cinema in April 2012 through the longest running flagship newscast in the Philippines, TV Patrol, now dubbed as "TV Patrol 25." The film was directed by Olivia Lamasan and will be a John Lloyd Cruz and Bea Alonzo comeback-movie after a two years hiatus. Their on-screen partnership, as in films like One More Chance (2007) and Miss You Like Crazy (2010), resumes in "The Mistress". The film also celebrates their joint 10th Anniversary in show business. Described as an "imperfect love story," the film features a more daring and mature Alonzo and Cruz.

=== Filming ===
The film was shot on various locations. The Callao Cave in Peñablanca, Cagayan was closed for two days on June 8 and 9 for the shooting of the movie. They also used various locations in the Cagayan province, especially in Tuguegarao City and the Baua Bridge in Gonzaga, Cagayan, while the beach scenes were at the Anguib Beach and "Boracay of the North" in Santa Ana, Cagayan. Release date is September 12, 2012, in theatres nationwide.

=== Music ===
The only song that is being played throughout the film is the hit single "Chasing Cars", written and performed by the Northern Irish–Scottish alternative rock band Snow Patrol.

== Release ==
=== International screening ===
Here are some selected international screening dates and venues of The Mistress:

Date	Country	Notes/Venue	Reference
September 14	Guam	Micronesia Mall Theaters only	
September 14; October 22	New Zealand	Auditorium Theater and SkyCity Convention centre only	
September 15	Europe	Nice, France	
September 21–27	United States	Select Cities and Theaters only	
September 27	UAE	Select Theaters only	
September 27	Qatar	Cine Center	
September 27	Bahrain	Seef Cineplex	
September 28	Canada	Edwards Cerritos Stadium	
September 28	Canada	Select Cities and Theaters only	

(notes: Please refer to the references links for the exact information for the International Screening of The Mistress)

== Reception ==
=== Critical response ===
The Mistress received generally positive reviews.

Philbert Ortiz Dy gave the film 3 out of 5 stars. He stated that The Mistress doesn't do a very good job of exploring what it is to be a mistress. It only depicts a few stolen moments from the adulterous relationship, focusing instead on the budding romance between the two younger characters.[...]The movie isn't as complex as the premise makes it sound. Though it tackles mature subject matter and plays with Oedipal themes, the film is really much more about the love story than it is about the adultery. He also stated that The Mistress can still be quite affecting. Taken away from the larger narrative, the movie is able to build a compelling fantasy that's far more romantic than one would expect and It still makes a compelling case for itself every now and then.

Phillip Cu-Unjieng of The Philippine Star magazine also gave a positive feedback to The Mistress. He states that Star Cinema's The Mistress is a "superb acting vehicle for both Bea Alonzo and John Lloyd Cruz, proving that even when tackling more mature roles, their chemistry, after a full decade, remains intact." And The Mistress has its texture of the screenplay and the sympathetic depth of the characters that make it such an absorbing film.

In a positive response by Maridol Rañoa-Bismark of Yahoo Philippines, The Mistress may be a serious film, but it can make moviegoers break into smiles with snippets of humor and “It’s a suspension of disbelief that will amaze even the most rabid mistress hater.”

Mark Angelo Ching and Jocelyn Dimaculangan of PEP also gave a positive response to the film, they stated that, "This movie casts a sympathetic look at someone who agrees to be a kept woman in exchange for a huge debt. But far from glorifying the mistress, the film delves into the heartwrenching pain brought about by being caught in this four-sided love affair."

=== Box office ===
According to Star Cinema's Advertising and Promotions Manager Mico del Rosario, The Mistress earned PHP 25 Million on its first day, beating the box-office record set by the other Star Cinema produced movie last year and currently the 3rd highest-grossing film of all time - The Unkabogable Praybeyt Benjamin starring Vice Ganda which only grossed PHP 23.9 Million on its opening day. On its first week, the film grosses in a range of PHP 120 Million - PHP 140 Million pesos. It became the fourth 2012 Filipino film to gross over 100 Million Pesos and ranked as the third local movie of 2012 in span of a week. As of September 23, the film grosses PHP 186,729,040, beating the 2012 top grosser, ÜnOfficially Yours, (which stars Angel Locsin and John Lloyd Cruz) that grosses PHP 157,254,200. On its 2nd week of showing, it now holds the #1 spot in the list of top-grossing Filipino film of 2012. As of September 29, 2012, and on its third week, the film grosses over PHP 230 Million, being the third highest grossing Filipino film of all time. As of its third to fourth box-office successor week and October 2, 2012, The film grosses more than PHP 300 Million pesos worldwide (according to Star Cinema), beating with the same genre film No Other Woman (whom stars Anne Curtis, Derek Ramsay, and Cristine Reyes) as the second Filipino highest-grossing films of all time.The Mistress is now the second highest grossing Filipino film of all time and the biggest local box-office hit this year after it remained the top-grossing movie in the Philippines for a second week in a row.

In contrary to the reports by its own distributor, according to Box Office Mojo, the film grossed only PHP 254 Million only on October 7, 2012, still being the third highest-grossing film in the Philippines. As of its 5th and final week of run, the film's total gross is PHP 262,790,300 Million Pesos, almost surpassed No Other Woman with a box-office gross of PHP 278,418,883 Million pesos.

As of 2016, The Mistress ranks 1st in highest-grossing film of 2012, and 16th place in all-time highest grossing local film.

== Accolades ==
List of awards and nominations
Award	Category	Recipients	Result	Source
44th GMMSF Box-Office Entertainment Awards (2013)	Most Popular Screenwriter	Olivia Lamasan and Vanessa Valdez	Won	
44th GMMSF Box-Office Entertainment Awards (2013)	Box Office King	John Lloyd Cruz	Won	
44th GMMSF Box-Office Entertainment Awards (2013)	Box Office Queen	Bea Alonzo	Won	
61st FAMAS Awards (2013)	Best Picture	The Mistress	Nominated	
61st FAMAS Awards (2013)	Best Director	Olivia Lamasan	Nominated	
61st FAMAS Awards (2013)	Best Actress	Bea Alonzo	Nominated	
61st FAMAS Awards (2013)	Best Supporting Actress	Hilda Koronel	Nominated	
61st FAMAS Awards (2013)	Best Supporting Actor	Ronaldo Valdez	Nominated	
61st FAMAS Awards (2013)	Best Child Actor	Clarence Delgado	Nominated	
61st FAMAS Awards (2013)	Best Screenplay	Vanessa Valdez	Nominated	
61st FAMAS Awards (2013)	Best Cinematography	Hermann Claravall	Nominated	
61st FAMAS Awards (2013)	Best Production Design	Shari Marie Terese E. Montiague	Nominated	
61st FAMAS Awards (2013)	Best Editing	Marya Ignacio	Nominated	
61st FAMAS Awards (2013)	Best Musical Score	Von de Guzman and Jessie Lasaten	Nominated	
61st FAMAS Awards (2013)	Best Sound	Aurel Claro Bilbao	Nominated	
31st Luna Awards (2013)	Best Director	Olivia Lamasan	Won	
31st Luna Awards (2013)	Best Actor	John Lloyd Cruz	Won	
31st Luna Awards (2013)	Best Supporting Actor	Ronaldo Valdez	Won	
31st Luna Awards (2013)	Best Supporting Actress	Hilda Koronel	Won	
31st Luna Awards (2013)	Best Screenplay	Vanessa Valdez	Won	
31st Luna Awards (2013)	Best Editing	Marya Ignacio	Won	
31st Luna Awards (2013)	Best Picture	The Mistress	Nominated	
31st Luna Awards (2013)	Best Actress	Bea Alonzo	Nominated	
31st Luna Awards (2013)	Best Cinematography	Herman Claravall	Nominated	
31st Luna Awards (2013)	Best Music	Von de Guzman and Jessie Lasaten	Nominated	
31st Luna Awards (2013)	Best Sound	Aurel Claro Bilbao	Nominated	
Golden Screen Awards (2013)	Best Motion Picture (Drama)	The Mistress	Nominated	
Golden Screen Awards (2013)	Best Performance by an Actress in a Leading Role (Drama)	Bea Alonzo	Nominated	
Golden Screen Awards (2013)	Best Performance by an Actor in a Leading Role (Drama)	John Lloyd Cruz	Nominated	
Golden Screen Awards (2013)	Best Performance by an Actress in a Supporting Role (Drama, Musical or Comedy)	Hilda Koronel	Nominated	
Golden Screen Awards (2013)	Best Performance by an Actor in a Supporting Role (Drama, Musical or Comedy)	Ronaldo Valdez	Nominated	
Golden Screen Awards (2013)	Best Director	Olivia Lamasan	Nominated	
Star Awards for Movies (2013)	Movie of the Year	The Mistress	Nominated	
Star Awards for Movies (2013)	Movie Director of the Year	Olivia Lamasan	Nominated	
Star Awards for Movies (2013)	Movie Actor of the Year	John Lloyd Cruz	Nominated	
Star Awards for Movies (2013)	Movie Actress of the Year	Bea Alonzo	Nominated	
Star Awards for Movies (2013)	Movie Supporting Actor of the Year	Ronaldo Valdez	Nominated	
Star Awards for Movies (2013)	Movie Supporting Actress of the Year	Hilda Koronel	Nominated	
Star Awards for Movies (2013)	Child Performer of the Year	Clarence Delgado	Nominated	
Star Awards for Movies (2013)	Movie Screenwriter of the Year	Vanessa Valdez	Nominated	
Star Awards for Movies (2013)	Movie Cinematographer of the Year	Hermann Claravall	Nominated	
Star Awards for Movies (2013)	Movie Production Designer of the Year	Shari Marie Terese E. Montiague	Nominated	
Star Awards for Movies (2013)	Movie Editor of the Year	Marya Ignacio	Nominated	
Star Awards for Movies (2013)	Movie Musical Scorer of the Year	Von de Guzman and Jessie Lasaten	Nominated	
Star Awards for Movies (2013)	Movie Sound Engineer of the Year	Aurel Claro Bilbao	Nominated	
