= The Real Me (Bea Alonzo album) =

Studio album by Bea Alonzo
- Released: June 2008
- Recorded: Mixsonic (Quezon City, Philippines)
- Genre: Pop
- Language: English; Filipino
- Label: Star Records
- Producer: Malou N. Santos; Annabelle Regalado-Borja; Jonathan Manalo; Roque \"rox\" B. Santos

Bea Alonzo chronology
The Real Me (2008)	Bea Alonzo (2010)

The Real Me is the debut album by Filipino actress Bea Alonzo. It was released in June 2008 by Star Records.

== Release ==
The album was launched on June 18 in the daily talk show Boy & Kris. In the show, Bea Alonzo sang two tracks from her album.

== Track listing ==
No.	Title	Writer(s)	Length
1.	"I'm Missing You" (originally performed by Meja)	Meja, D Carr, T. Ekman, P. Adebratt	3:38
2.	"Crazy About You"	Alexie Corvilla	3:36
3.	"Close To You"	D. Riva, A. Pignagnoli, A. Gordon	3:27
4.	"You" (originally performed by Jim Brickman)	Jim Brickman, Dave Deviller, Sean Hosein	3:51
5.	"I'll Always Love You" (originally performed by Taylor Dayne, 1988)	Eric Kaz, Tom Snow	4:12
6.	"Kagandahan (Betty La Fea Theme)"	Roque "rox" Santos / Jonathan Manalo	4:06

== Awards ==
- 2009 Waki OPM Music Awards as Breakout Star of 2008 (I'm Missing You)
- 2009 Waki OPM Music Awards as Listener's Choice Award (Female)
