= Unbreakable (2019 Filipino film) =

- Theatrical release poster
- Directed by: Mae Cruz-Alviar
- Screenplay by: Vanessa R. Valdez; Additional: Mae Cruz-Alviar
- Story by: Vanessa R. Valdez
- Based on: An original screenplay by Kris Ann dela Peña, Patrick R. Valencia and Vanessa R. Valdez
- Produced by: Marizel Samson-Martinez(supervising)
- Starring: Angelica Panganiban; Bea Alonzo; Richard Gutierrez
- Cinematography: Hermann Claravall
- Edited by: Beng Bandong
- Music by: Cesar Francis Concio
- Production company: Star Cinema
- Distributed by: ABS-CBN Film Productions
- Release date: 27 November 2019
- Country: Philippines
- Languages: Filipino, English
- Box office: ₱120 million

Unbreakable is a 2019 Filipino romantic drama film directed by Mae Cruz-Alviar and written by Vanessa R. Valdez from an original screenplay concept she co-developed with Kris Ann dela Peña and Patrick R. Valencia. The film stars Angelica Panganiban, Bea Alonzo, and Richard Gutierrez.

Produced and distributed by ABS-CBN Film Productions, the film, released theatrically on November 27, 2019, received mixed-to-positive reviews, but the over-dramatization in the story was criticised.

== Plot ==
=== 2005 ===
Then aged-18, Mariel Salvador and Deena Yambao become friends in college. While Mariel is an IT major, Deena is more impulsive and keeps changing majors and is insistent on having a boyfriend. No matter what happened in life, they vowed to maintain their friendship.

=== 2012 ===
Mariel is set to marry photographer-cum-businessman Justin Saavedra. Deena, who eventually became a nurse in Norway, goes to a wedding in the Philippines as a maid of honour where she meets Justin's brother Bene Saavedra. Issues arise when Justin and Bene's mother, Helen Saavedra takes a liking for Deena while having a grudge against Mariel.

Whether their desires in love affect their friendship form the rest of the story.

== Cast ==
- Angelica Panganiban as Deena Yambao
- Bea Alonzo as Mariel Salvador
- Richard Gutierrez as Justin Saavedra, Mariel's ex-husband. He is the father of Mareena, Deena's daughter
- Ian Veneracion as Bene Saavedra, Justin's older brother who married Deena. He was killed in a plane crash
- Rosanna Roces as Janice Salvador, Mariel's mother
- Gloria Diaz as Helen Saavedra, mother of Justin and Bene
- Via Antonio as Sarah
- PJ Endrinal as Pochoy
- Allan Paule as Dodi, Mariel's father
- Issa Litton as Cara
- Joao Constancia as Alfred Salvador, Mariel's one of younger brothers
- Anthony Jennings as Mark Salvador, Mariel's one of younger brothers
  - Luke Alford as young Mark
- Keagan de Jesus as TJ
  - Robbie Wachtel as young TJ
- Kit Thompson as Kiko
- Victor Silayan as Luke
- Xia Vigor as Mareena, Deena's daughter with Justin and Mariel's goddaughter
- Regine Tolentino as Mariel's boss
- Allan Villafuerte as Drew
- Marnie Lapus as Dr. Evalle
- Raul Montesa as doctor
- Mitchie Ann Vinluan as Michelle (Helen's PA)

== Reception ==
A critic from Rappler wrote that "Unbreakable uses low-brow tragedy as a crutch. It is so desperate for sobs that it injects its storyline with the most unimaginative of devices. The film verges on being totally shameless". A critic from Cosmopolitan wrote that "Unbreakable is not a perfect film though" and concluded that "overall, I would say this movie is outstanding and definitely a must-watch for every Cosmo girl and her best girl friends".
