= Now That I Have You =

2004 Filipino film

- Theatrical release poster
- Directed by: Laurenti M. Dyogi
- Written by: Jose Javier Reyes
- Produced by: Marizel Samson-Martinez
- Starring: John Lloyd Cruz; Bea Alonzo
- Cinematography: Regiben O. Romana
- Edited by: Marya Ignacio
- Music by: Jesse Lucas
- Production company: ABS-CBN Film Productions, Inc.
- Distributed by: Star Cinema
- Release date: August 11, 2004
- Country: Philippines
- Language: Filipino
- Box office: ₱84 million

Now That I Have You is a 2004 Filipino film starring John Lloyd Cruz and Bea Alonzo (both of whom remained from the top-rating drama series on primetime It Might Be You). The film premiered on August 11, 2004 at SM Megamall, under Star Cinema and directed by Laurenti M. Dyogi. The film got a "B" rating from the Cinema Evaluation Board of the Philippines. "Now That I Have You" is also the film's theme song performed by Erik Santos and Sheryn Regis, a song originally sung by The Company.

== Plot ==
Betsy (Bea Alonzo) and Michael (John Lloyd Cruz) are only two of the people who ride the Manila Metro Rail Transit System Line 3 every day. Betsy is a hopeless romantic, while Michael is a non-believer when it comes to love and romance.

Betsy is overcome with excitement when her best friend (Nikki Valdez) and her boyfriend set Betsy up on a date with Michael. However, when they finally meet, Michael turns out to be the exact opposite of her ideal man. But Betsy doesn't let herself become disheartened, instead she allows herself to fall in love with the real Michael.

== Cast ==
=== Main ===
- John Lloyd Cruz as Michael Morelos
- Bea Alonzo as Betsy Rallos

=== Also starring ===
- John Arcilla as Oscar Morelos
- Rio Locsin as Ceres Rallos
- Jean Saburit as Lucille Morelos
- Noel Colet as Pocholo Rallos
- Nikki Valdez as Stefi [Estefania]
- Kristopher Peralta as Jacob
- Lui Villaruz as Martin
- Jojit Lorenzo as Gabriel
- Hyubs Azarcon as Chito Perez
- Cholo Escaño as Khalil Rallos

=== Introducing ===
- Roxanne Guinoo as Katherine
- Neri Naig as Joey

== Credits ==
- AdProm and Publicity: Roxy A. Liquigan, El Oro (The Team)
- Sound Engineer: Bebet Casas
- Musical Director: Jesse Lucas
- Film Editor:Marya Ignacio
- Production Designer:Elfren Vibar
- Story and Screenplay by:Jose Javier Reyes
- Director of Photography: Regiben O. Romana
- Line Producer: Marizel Samson-Martinez
- Executive Producers: Malou N. Santos, Charo Santos-Concio
- Directed by: Laurenti Dyogi
