= Eerie (film) =

2018 film by Mikhail Red

- Theatrical release poster
- Directed by: Mikhail Red
- Screenplay by: Mikhail Red; Rae Red; Mariah Reodica
- Produced by: Micah Tadena
- Starring: Bea Alonzo; Charo Santos-Concio; Jake Cuenca; Maxene Magalona
- Cinematography: Mycko David
- Edited by: Jeffrey Loreno; Nicolas Red
- Music by: Myka Magsaysay-Sigua; Paul Sigua
- Production companies: ABS-CBN Film Productions; PelikulaRed; Cre8 Productions; URSA Studios; Media East
- Distributed by: mm2 Entertainment (Singapore; theatrical); Cathay Cineplexes (Singapore; theatrical); Star Cinema (Philippines; theatrical); 108 Media (Worldwide; all media)
- Release dates: December 3, 2018 (Singapore International Film Festival); March 27, 2019 (Philippines)
- Running time: 101 minutes
- Country: Philippines
- Language: Tagalog
- Box office: ₱210 million

Eerie is a 2018 Filipino supernatural horror film written and directed by Mikhail Red, starring Bea Alonzo and Charo Santos-Concio. The film uses elements of suspense writing and follows a clairvoyant guidance counselor called Pat Consolacion (Alonzo). She embarks on solving the mysterious death of a student at the Catholic school, Sta. Lucia Academy for girls.

The film was produced by Star Cinema in partnership with 108 Media in Singapore. It was first released in Singapore as a premiere during the Singapore International Film Festival. The film was released in the Philippines on March 27, 2019.

== Plot ==
The unexpected and gruesome death of a student threatens the existence of an old Catholic school for girls. Pat Consolacion is the school guidance counsellor who involves herself with the students to help them cope. She also helps uncover the mysteries of the student's death. Most students suspect it is the strict and borderline abusive Mother Alice. This is because she also threatened Pat's tenure in the school because of her continuous meddling with the case. But Pat's unusual talents lead her to know Eri, a former student who has been watching the whole school for years. Pat uncovers the secret of the school and the monster that it nurtured for the past century.

Pat disguises herself as a nun and gains access to Eri's file within Sor Alice's office.

Sor Alice tells Pat about her time as the guidance counselor, failing to help Eri. She tells her about seeing Mang Fidel over Clara the night she died but also seeing Eri's spirit watching over the two.

Pat goes to the school at night to talk to Eri again. They talk within the confessional, where Eri confesses about her deeds. She tells of her life within the school, being bullied by the other students, the nuns punishing her, her mother cutting her hair unflatteringly leading to more bullying, culminating to hanging herself in the bathroom. She tells about her figuring out how she manages to possess her father to strangle her mother and Mang Fidel to strangle Clara. She also tells her about her plans for Pat who is next. Eri manages to possess Julian, who chases Pat across the school, leading to a confrontation on a rooftop. While Julian is strangling Pat, Clara comes out and pushes Eri and herself off the roof to save Pat.

The film ends with Pat finding out that Julian managed to kill her, finding Joyce in her wake in the school chapel. Joyce attempts to jump from the school roof, but Pat manages to stop her.

== Cast ==
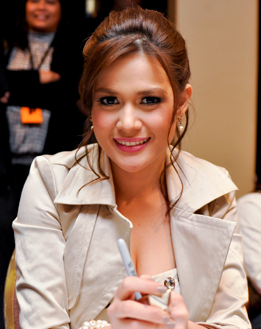
Bea Alonzo portrays Pat Consolacion

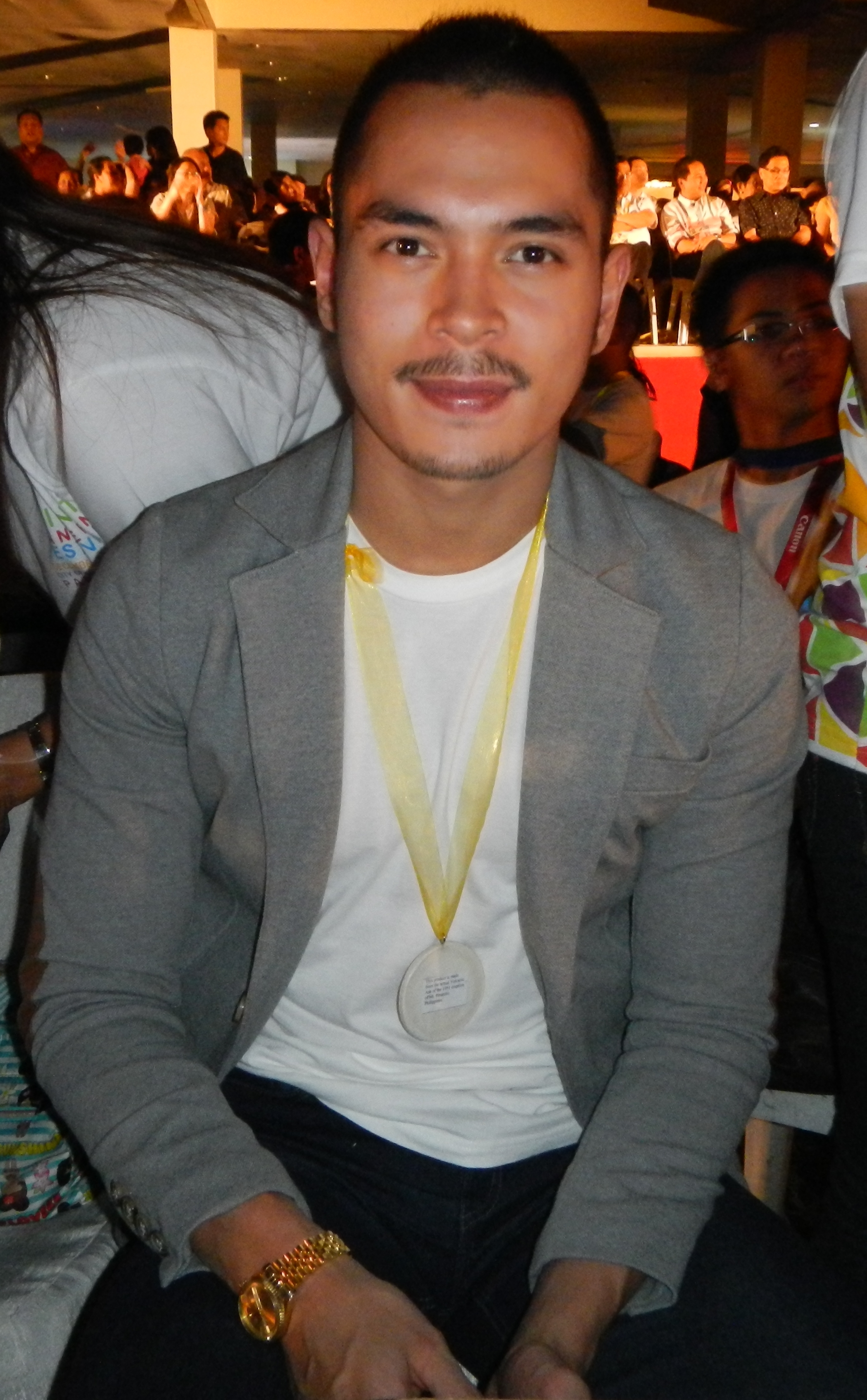
Jake Cuenca portrays Julian Castro

- Bea Alonzo as Patricia "Pat" Consolacion
- Charo Santos-Concio as Mother Alice
- Jake Cuenca as Julian Castro
- Maxene Magalona as Sister Mia
- Mary Joy Apostol as Clara
- Gabby Padilla as Joyce
- Gillian Vicencio as Erika Sayco
- AJ Muhlach
- Angeli Bayani
- Nafa Hilario-Cruz
- Menggie Cobarrubias
- Ery Ziann Reyes
- Isabela Francisco
