= Mae Cruz-Alviar =

Filipino film and television director

- Born: Mae Czarina Reyes Cruz; April 30, 1974 (age 52)
- Occupations: TV and film director
- Years active: 1994–present

Mae Czarina Reyes Cruz-Alviar (born April 30, 1974) is a Filipino film and television director. She is known for directing Star Cinema films such as Crazy Beautiful You (2015), Can't Help Falling in Love (2017), Four Sisters Before the Wedding (2020) and Rewind (2023).

== Early life and education ==
Mae Cruz was born on April 30, 1974. She has three sisters, and was raised in the Roman Catholic faith. Cruz attended elementary and high school at Colegio San Agustin – Makati, and later graduated with a degree in mass communication (major in film) at the University of the Philippines Diliman.

In 1991, during her fourth year in high school, Cruz attended the shoot of a Swatch commercial starring her best friend Mikee Cojuangco and directed by Rowell Santiago, where she was inspired to enter the film industry.

== Career ==
In 1994, Cruz was initially cast in a brief speaking role in Mikee Cojuangco's debut film Forever for a party scene alongside future talk show host Patricia Daza, but although her and Daza's scene was filmed, it was ultimately cut in post-production.

In 1996, Cruz was hired by the production company Star Cinema, beginning her film career as a junior production assistant for the fantasy film Magic Temple.

In 2002, Cruz began directing episodes for the ABS-CBN anthology drama Maalaala Mo Kaya with the episode "Kurtina" starring Marvin Agustin. In 2004, Cruz directed her first film, a composite romantic comedy titled Bcuz of U, alongside John D. Lazatin and fellow first-time director Cathy Garcia-Molina. She later directed her first solo film, the romantic comedy Babe, I Love You starring Anne Curtis and Sam Milby, in 2010.

== Personal life ==
Cruz met Benjamin Alviar in 1988 while attending high school at Colegio San Agustin – Makati, with Alviar leaving for the United States in 1992. After meeting each other again during a high school reunion in 2011, Cruz and Alviar married each other in 2014. Cruz has a step-son from Alviar's previous marriage in the US.

Cruz is a long-time best friend of actress and equestrian Mikee Cojuangco-Jaworski, who was her high school classmate at Colegio San Agustin.

== Filmography ==
=== Film ===
==== As director ====
Year	Title	Notes	Ref.
2004	Bcuz of U	with John D. Lazatin, Cathy Garcia-Molina	
2010	Babe, I Love You		
2011	Catch Me, I'm in Love		
2012	Every Breath U Take		
2012	24/7 in Love		
2013	She's the One		
2014	Bride for Rent		
2014	Past Tense		
2015	Crazy Beautiful You		
2015	Must Date the Playboy	Serialized in iWant TV	
2015	Everyday I Love You		
2017	Can't Help Falling in Love		
2019	Unbreakable		
2020	Four Sisters Before the Wedding		
2021	Love or Money		
2023	Rewind	Entry to the 49th Metro Manila Film Festival	
2025	Love You So Bad	Entry to the 51st Metro Manila Film Festival	
2026	Remember		

==== As associate director ====
Year	Title	Notes	Ref.
2002	Kailangan Kita		
2009	In My Life		

==== As assistant director ====
Year	Title	Notes	Ref.
1998	Kung Ayaw Mo, Huwag Mo!		
1998	Kay Tagal Kang Hinintay		
2000	Anak		

==== Miscellaneous ====
Year	Title	Credited as	Notes	Ref(s).
1996	Lahar	Junior production assistant		
1996	Mara Clara: The Movie	Script continuity		
1996	Magic Temple	Junior production assistant		
1997	Ang Pulubi at ang Prinsesa	Script continuity		
1997	Flames: The Movie	Script continuity		
1997	Ipaglaban Mo: The Movie II	Script continuity		
2014	That Thing Called Tadhana	Story consultant		

=== Television ===
Year	Title	Role	Notes	Ref(s).
1998–1999	Sa Sandaling Kailangan Mo Ako	Assistant director		
2000–2002	Pangako sa 'Yo	Assistant director Backpack director		
2002–2017	Maalaala Mo Kaya	Director	56 episodes	
2003	Wansapanataym	2nd unit director	Episode: "Isa... Dalawa... Tatlo"	
2005	Mga Anghel Na Walang Langit	Director		
2006	Maging Sino Ka Man	Director		
2007	Your Song	Director	First episode	
2007	Maging Sino Ka Man: Ang Pagbabalik	Second director		
2009	The Wedding	Second director	3 episodes	
2010	Magkaribal	Director	91 episodes	
2014	Hawak-Kamay	Third director		
2015–2016	Pangako sa 'Yo	Sixth director		
2016	Dolce Amore	Director		
2017	La Luna Sangre	Guest director		
2018	Sana Dalawa ang Puso	Director		
2018	Ngayon at Kailanman	Director		
2020	Make It with You	Director		
2022	2 Good 2 Be True	Director		
2023	Can't Buy Me Love	Director		
2025	It’s Okay to Not Be Okay	Director		
2026	The Loyalty Game	Director		

== Accolades ==
Awards and nominations received by Mae Cruz-Alviar
Awards and Nominations
Organization	Year	Nominated Work	Category	Result	Ref.
Asian Academy Creative Awards	2024	Can't Buy Me Love	Best Direction (Fiction)	Won	
FAMAS Awards	2016	Crazy Beautiful You	Best Director	Nominated	
FAMAS Awards	2024	Rewind	Best Director	Nominated	
Luna Award	2024	Rewind	Best Director	Nominated	
Metro Manila Film Festival	2023	Rewind	Best Director	Nominated	
PMPC Star Awards for Movies	2016	Crazy Beautiful You	Movie Director of the Year	Nominated	
PMPC Star Awards for Movies	2022	Four Sisters Before The Wedding	Movie Director of the Year	Nominated	
PMPC Star Awards for Movies	2024	Rewind	Movie Director of the Year	Nominated	
