= First Love (2018 film) =

2018 romantic drama film by Paul Soriano

- Theatrical release poster
- Directed by: Paul Soriano
- Screenplay by: Anjeli Pessumal; Rona Co
- Story by: Paul Soriano
- Produced by: Carlo L. Katigbak; Olivia M. Lamasan; Malou N. Santos; Vic del Rosario Jr.; Paul Soriano; Mark Victor
- Starring: Aga Muhlach; Bea Alonzo
- Cinematography: Shayne Sarte
- Edited by: Mark Victor
- Music by: Cesar Francis Concio
- Production companies: Star Cinema; Viva Films; Ten17P
- Distributed by: ABS-CBN Film Productions
- Release date: October 17, 2018
- Running time: 122 minutes
- Country: Philippines
- Languages: Filipino; English
- Box office: ₱95 million

First Love is a 2018 Philippine romantic drama film co-produced and directed by Paul Soriano and written by Anjeli Pessumal and Rona Co from Soriano's story concept. Starring Aga Muhlach and Bea Alonzo, the film tells a love story between a photographer and a venture capitalist in the city on Canada's Pacific coast.

Filmed in Vancouver and produced by Ten17P, in participation with ABS-CBN Film Productions and Viva Films, the film was theatrically released in the Philippines on October 17, 2018.

== Plot ==
Ali (Bea Alonzo) is an impulsive photographer who savors every moment of her life. Nick (Aga Muhlach), is a venture capitalist, who accidentally meets Ali in a bookshop where Ali works. The two strangers bump into each other underneath the shop’s doorway and, in slo-mo fashion, they connect on a deep, romantic level that doesn’t quite reach you.

Ali’s infectious charm is too strong for Nick to resist. She is full of life and lives each day like it’s her last, quite literally because Ali has a grave heart condition. Soon, their chance encounter turns into something deeper, something worth risking heartbreak for.

== Cast ==
- Aga Muhlach as Nick Gutierrez
- Bea Alonzo as Allison "Ali" Castillo
- Sandy Andolong as Bernadette
- Albie Casiño as Sebastian
- Edward Barber as Simon
- Tim Donadt as Ben
- Marcus Dreeke as ER Doctor
- Lee O'Brian as Doctor Burns
- G. Toengi as Vicky
- Raymond Lauchengco as Dave
- Beverly Salviejo as Martha
- Patti Lapus as Sam
- Will Devaughn as Kevin
- Maureen Mann as Mrs. Wilson, Bookstore Owner

== See also ==
- When Love Begins
