= 2013 FAMAS Awards =

Annual Filipino film awards ceremony

61st FAMAS Awards
- Date: April 21, 2013
- Site: AFP Theater, Camp Aguinaldo, Quezon City
- Hosted by: Pops Fernandez and Christian Bautista

Highlights
- Best Picture: El Presidente
- Most awards: El Presidente (14)
- Most nominations: El Presidente (16)

Television coverage
- Network: GMA 7

The 61st Filipino Academy of Movie Arts and Sciences Awards Night was held at the AFP Theater in Camp Aguinaldo, Quezon City on April 21, 2013.

El Presidente (English: The President; Filipino: Ang Pangulo), a 2012 biopic film based on the life of Gen. Emilio Aguinaldo, the first president of the Philippine Republic is this edition's recipient of the Best Picture Award while its lead star, Jeorge Estregan, got the award for Best Actor. Angel Locsin, the female lead for the film One More Try, won as this year's Best Actress.

== Nominees and winners ==
=== Major awards ===
Winners are listed first and highlighted with boldface.

Best Picture	Best Director
**El Presidente — Scenema Concept International**; A Secret Affair — Vic del Rosario, Vicente del Rosario III, Veronique del Rosario-Corpus, June T. Rufino; Migrante — XITI Productions; One More Try — Charo Santos-Concio, Malou Santos; The Mistress — Elma Medua, Charo Santos-Concio, Malou Santos	**Mark Meily — El Presidente**; Ruel S. Bayani — One More Try; Joel Lamangan — Migrante; Nuel Crisostomo Naval — A Secret Affair; Olivia Lamasan — The Mistress
Best Actor	Best Actress
**Jeorge Estregan — El Presidente as Emilio Aguinaldo**; Derek Ramsay — A Secret Affair as Anton; Jericho Rosales — Alagwa as Robert Lim; Coco Martin — Sta. Niña as Pol; Vic Sotto — Si Agimat, si Enteng Kabisote at si Ako as Enteng Kabisote; Bong Revilla — Si Agimat, si Enteng Kabisote at si Ako as Agimat; John Lloyd Cruz — The Mistress as Eric "JD" Torres; Dingdong Dantes — One More Try as Edward Mendoza	**Angel Locsin — One More Try as Grace**; Cristine Reyes — El Presidente as Hilaria Aguinaldo; Anne Curtis — A Secret Affair as Rafaela "Rafi" Delgado; Andi Eigenmann — A Secret Affair as Samantha "Sam" Montinola; Angelica Panganiban — One More Try as Jacq Mendoza; Bea Alonzo — The Mistress as Rosario "Saree" Alfonso; Jodi Sta. Maria — Migrante as Frida Mallari; Judy Ann Santos — Si Agimat, si Enteng Kabisote at si Ako as Angelina Kalinisan Orteza
Best Supporting Actor	Best Supporting Actress
**Cesar Montano — El Presidente as Andres Bonifacio**; Martin del Rosario — Amorosa: The Revenge as Amiel; Ronaldo Valdez — The Mistress as Frederico "Rico" Torres; Jose Manalo — Si Agimat, si Enteng Kabisote at si Ako as Jose; Tony Mabesa — Migrante; Zanjoe Marudo — One More Try as Tristan	**Jaclyn Jose — A Secret Affair as Ellen Delgado**; Chynna Ortaleza — Migrante as Lisa Marasigan; Hilda Koronel — The Mistress as Regina Torres; Kim Chiu — The Healing as Cookie Limguangco; Carmina Villarroel — One More Try as Dr. Diesta Gimeno
Best Child Actor	Best Child Actress
**Miguel Vergara — One More Try as Bochok**; Nash Aguas — Larong Bata; Clarence Delgado — The Mistress as Mamon; Bugoy Cariño — Alagwa as Bryan	**Barbara Miguel — Migrante**; Ryzza Mae Dizon — Si Agimat, si Enteng Kabisote at si Ako as Chichay; Xyriel Manabat — Amorosa: The Revenge as Nadia
Best Screenplay	Best Cinematography
**El Presidente — Mark Meily**; A Secret Affair — Mel Mendoza-Del Rosario; One More Try — Karen Ramos, Kriz G. Gazmen, Ricardo Fernando III; The Mistress — Vanessa R. Valdez	**El Presidente — Carlo Mendoza**; One More Try — Charlie Peralta; The Mistress — Hermann Claravall
Best Musical Score	Best Sound
**El Presidente — Jessie Lasaten**; One More Try — Raul Mitra; The Mistress — Jessie Lasaten and Von De Guzman; Migrante — Lucien Letaba, Bonifacio Ilagan, and Rody Vera	**El Presidente — Addiss Tabong and Albert Michael Idioma**; One More Try — Aurel Claro Bilbao; The Mistress — Arnel Labayo
Best Editing	Best Special Effects
**El Presidente — Ryan Orduña and Jason Cahapay**; One More Try — Vito Cajili; The Mistress — Marya Ignacio	**El Presidente — Scenema Concept International**; Si Agimat, si Enteng Kabisote at si Ako — GMA Films, OctoArts Films, APT Entertainment, Imus Productions, and M-Zet Productions
Best Visual Effects	Best Story
**El Presidente — Scenema Concept International**; Si Agimat, si Enteng Kabisote at si Ako — GMA Films, OctoArts Films, APT Entertainment, Imus Productions, and M-Zet Productions	**El Presidente — Scenema Concept International**; Migrante — XITI Productions
Best Theme Song	Best Production Design
**"Aking Inang Bayan" from El Presidente — Jessie Lasaten, Marizen Yaneza (Maita Ejercito)**; "El Presidente" from El Presidente — Jamir Garcia (Apl.de.ap); "Saan Ako Tutungo" from Migrante — Melvin Corpin, Rody Vera, Bonifacio Ilagan, and Lucien Letaba (Honey Araneta)	**El Presidente — Danny Red and Joel Bilbao**; One More Try — Nancy Arcega; The Mistress — Shari Marie Terese E. Montiague

=== Special awards ===
**German Moreno Youth Achievement Award**

- Janella Salvador
- Xian Lim
- Ruru Madrid
- Joyce Ching

**Recognition Award**

- German Moreno (For 50th Year in Philippine Cinema)

**Arturo M. Padua Memorial Award**

- Cristy Fermin

**Fernando Poe, Jr. Memorial Award**

- Jeorge Estregan

**Presidential Award for Cinematic Arts Excellence**

- Nora Aunor

**FAMAS Grand Award**

- Francis Tolentino, MMDA Chairman

**Public Service Award**

- Victor B. Endriga, PhD
- Amado Domingo Valdez

**Celebrity Skin of the Night**

- Maxene Magalona

**Great Shape Award**

- Benjamin Alves
