= Four Sisters and a Wedding =

2013 comedy-drama film by Cathy Garcia-Molina

Four Sisters and A Wedding
- Theatrical movie poster
- Directed by: Cathy Garcia-Molina
- Screenplay by: Vanessa Valdez
- Story by: Jose Javier Reyes (Note: Jose Javier Reyes wrote the original screenplay before being adapted by Vanessa Valdez.)
- Produced by: Charo Santos-Concio
- Starring: Angel Locsin; Toni Gonzaga; Bea Alonzo; Shaina Magdayao; Enchong Dee
- Cinematography: Noel Teehankee
- Edited by: Marya Ignacio
- Music by: Raul Mitra
- Production company: Star Cinema
- Distributed by: ABS-CBN Film Productions
- Release dates: June 26, 2013 (Philippines); July 5, 2013 (international)
- Running time: 125 minutes
- Country: Philippines
- Language: Filipino
- Budget: ₱20 million (estimated)
- Box office: ₱145 million

Four Sisters and a Wedding is a 2013 Filipino family comedy-drama film directed by Cathy Garcia-Molina and written by Vanessa Valdez from an original screenplay written and developed by Jose Javier Reyes. The film stars Toni Gonzaga, Bea Alonzo, Angel Locsin, and Shaina Magdayao as the four sisters attempting to stop the wedding of their younger brother, played by Enchong Dee. It also features a supporting cast including Angeline Quinto, Carmi Martin, Boboy Garovillo, Janus del Prado, and Bernard Palanca.

Produced and distributed by ABS-CBN Film Productions for its 20th founding anniversary, in collaboration with Rebisco on its 50th anniversary, the film was theatrically released in the Philippines on June 26, 2013, and internationally on July 5.

== Plot ==
When CJ, the youngest Salazar sibling, announces his wedding, his sister Gabbie convinces their other sisters to come home as requested by their mother, Grace. Teddie, the eldest, is a laid-off teacher now working as a waitress in Madrid. Bobbie, the second sister, is a corporate communications manager in New York living with her boyfriend Tristan and his daughter Trixie. The third sister, Alex, is an assistant film director struggling with her job and her relationship with Bobbie's ex-boyfriend Chad. Gabbie is a teacher who takes care of their mother. Bobbie faces pressure from Tristan to marry despite having a difficult relationship with Trixie. Teddie, unable to afford a plane ticket, convinces her colleague Frodo to return to Manila with her, pretending to be a couple.

When the family reunites, the sisters express their concerns about CJ's abrupt decision to marry, offending him and prompting apologies. CJ accepts but asks them to behave when meeting his fiancée, Princess Bayag, and her family. At the Bayags' villa, Princess's parents ask CJ to sign a prenuptial agreement. Appalled, the sisters plan to stop the wedding. Bobbie suggests CJ is marrying out of desperation, and Teddie asks their housekeeper, Toti Marie, to introduce CJ to other girls, leading to a failed boys' night out. The next day, Tristan tells Bobbie to decide on their marriage by the time he returns from overseas.

Teddie and Frodo visit a Bayags' spa with an obscene tagline, suspecting anomalies. Teddie asks Frodo to use their services, and when he moans during the massage, she calls the police. They discover the "happy ending" refers to happy thoughts after a massage. Jeanette threatens to investigate the Salazars. CJ confronts his sisters about the incident, assuring them the wedding will proceed. Bobbie confronts Teddie, leading to an argument. Later, Bobbie sees Chad flirting with another woman while buying condoms. The next morning, Bobbie tells Alex, but they end up fighting.

The Bayags visit the Salazars to show the wedding gowns, which the Salazars dislike. Honey Boy suggests playing charades to decide the gowns. During the game, the Bayags hint that Teddie is a maid, prompting Grace to make them leave. Confronted by Grace, Teddie admits she was laid off during the recession and vents her emotions. Bobbie reveals her lifelong hurt and loneliness to Grace, leading Trixie to sympathize with her.

The next day, Alex and Bobbie reconcile, and Alex breaks up with Chad. Later, CJ informs his family of Princess's grandfather's death, prompting the two families to reconcile and apologize. Due to a superstition, CJ and Princess's wedding is canceled. To avoid wasting the preparations and expenses, Bobbie marries Tristan instead, with the Salazars wearing the Bayags' gowns.

== Cast ==
- Bea Alonzo as Roberta Olivia "Bobbie" Salazar
- Angel Locsin as Alexandra Camille "Alex" Salazar
- Toni Gonzaga as Theodora Grace "Teddie" Salazar
- Shaina Magdayao as Gabriella Sophia "Gabbie" Salazar
- Enchong Dee as Carlos Jose "CJ / Reb-Reb" Salazar
- Coney Reyes as Grace Salazar
- Sam Milby as Tristan Harris
- Angeline Quinto as Princess Antoinette May Bayag
- Carmi Martin as Jeanette Bayag
- Boboy Garovillo as Honey Boy Bayag
- Janus del Prado as Frodo Teodoro
- Bernard Palanca as Chad Quinto
- Vangie Labalan as Manang Bugayong
- Cecil Paz as Matutina Marie "Toti Marie / Tina Marie" Bugayong
- Joy Viado as Sassa
- Samantha Faytaren as Trixie Harris
- Mocha Uson as Mocha
- Juan Rodrigo as Carlo "Caloy" Salazar

== Soundtrack ==
The film's soundtrack was Salamat, which was written by Christian Martinez and performed by Richard Yap. The said song was also used in the celebration of Rebisco's (the film's sponsor) 50th anniversary.

== Accolades ==
Year	Award	Category	Recipients and nominees	Outcome
2014	62nd FAMAS Awards	Best Picture	Four Sisters and a Wedding	Nominated
2014	62nd FAMAS Awards	Best Director	Cathy Garcia-Molina	Nominated
2014	62nd FAMAS Awards	Best Actress	Bea Alonzo	Nominated
2014	62nd FAMAS Awards	Best Actress	Toni Gonzaga	Nominated
2014	62nd FAMAS Awards	Best Actress	Angel Locsin	Nominated
2014	62nd FAMAS Awards	Best Supporting Actress	Coney Reyes	Nominated
2014	62nd FAMAS Awards	Best Screenplay	Vanessa Valdez	Nominated
2014	62nd FAMAS Awards	Best Story	Vanessa Valdez	Nominated
2014	62nd FAMAS Awards	Best Film Editing	Marya Ignacio	Nominated
2014	62nd FAMAS Awards	Best Sound	Raul Mitra	Nominated
2014	62nd FAMAS Awards	Best Musical Score	Raul Mitra	Nominated
2014	16th Gawad PASADO Awards	Best Supporting Actress	Toni Gonzaga	Won
2014	16th Gawad PASADO Awards	Best Supporting Actress	Bea Alonzo	Won
2014	16th Gawad PASADO Awards	Best Supporting Actress	Angel Locsin	Won
2014	16th Gawad PASADO Awards	Best Supporting Actress	Shaina Magdayao	Won
2014	30th PMPC Star Awards for Movies	Movie of the Year	Four Sisters and a Wedding	Nominated
2014	30th PMPC Star Awards for Movies	Movie Actress of the Year	Bea Alonzo	Nominated
2014	30th PMPC Star Awards for Movies	Movie Actress of the Year	Angel Locsin	Nominated
2014	30th PMPC Star Awards for Movies	Movie Director of the Year	Cathy Garcia-Molina	Nominated
2014	30th PMPC Star Awards for Movies	Movie Screenwriter of the Year	Vanessa R. Valdez	Nominated
2014	30th PMPC Star Awards for Movies	Movie Supporting Actress of the Year	Coney Reyes	Nominated
2014	30th PMPC Star Awards for Movies	Movie Editor of the Year	Marya Ignacio	Nominated
2014	30th PMPC Star Awards for Movies	Movie Cinematographer of the Year	Manuel Teehankee	Nominated
2014	30th PMPC Star Awards for Movies	Movie Musical Scorer of the Year	Raul Mitra	Nominated
2014	30th PMPC Star Awards for Movies	Movie Sound Engineer of the Year	Aurel Claro Bilbao	Nominated
2014	30th PMPC Star Awards for Movies	Movie Production Designer of the Year	Winston Acuyong	Nominated
2014	11th Golden Screen Awards	Best Motion Picture (Musical or Comedy)	Four Sisters and a Wedding	Nominated
2014	11th Golden Screen Awards	Best Performance by an Actress in a Leading Role (Musical or Comedy)	Angel Locsin	Nominated
2014	11th Golden Screen Awards	Best Performance by an Actress in a Leading Role (Musical or Comedy)	Bea Alonzo	Nominated
2014	11th Golden Screen Awards	Best Performance by an Actor in a Leading Role (Musical or Comedy)	Enchong Dee	Nominated
2014	11th Golden Screen Awards	Best Performance by an Actress in a Supporting Role (Musical or Comedy)	Coney Reyes	Nominated

== Prequel ==
On February 27, 2020, Star Cinema announced that the film would be getting a prequel entitled Four Sisters Before the Wedding. The prequel was directed by Giselle Andres, an assistant director in the original film; however, Mae Cruz-Alviar replaced her. Four Sisters Before the Wedding is set during the Salazar siblings' teenage years. The prequel stars Charlie Dizon, Alexa Ilacad, Gillian Vicencio, and Belle Mariano as Teddie, Bobbie, Alex, and Gabbie, respectively. It was produced by SCX, a sub-brand under ABS-CBN Films, Star Cinema.
