= A Beautiful Affair =

Philippine romantic melodrama television series

- Title card
- Genre: Drama; Romance
- Created by: ABS-CBN Studios; Katasi M. Flores
- Written by: Katski M. Flores; Tanya Winona E. Bautista; Chie E. Floresca; Jose Ruel L. Garcia
- Directed by: Katski M. Flores; Jerome C. Pobocan
- Starring: John Lloyd Cruz; Bea Alonzo; John Estrada
- Opening theme: "After All" by Martin Nievera and Vina Morales
- Composers: Tom Snow; Dean Pitchford
- Country of origin: Philippines
- Original language: Filipino
- No. of episodes: 60

Production
- Executive producers: Carlo Katigbak; Cory Vidanes; Laurenti Dyogi; Roldeo T. Endrinal
- Producers: Anna Krynessa Rivera; Row Tan
- Production locations: Philippines; Austria; Japan
- Running time: 30-45 minutes
- Production company: Dreamscape Entertainment Television

Original release
- Network: ABS-CBN
- Release: October 29, 2012 – January 18, 2013

A Beautiful Affair is a Philippine television drama romantic series broadcast by ABS-CBN. Directed by Katski M. Flores and Jerome C. Pobocan, it stars John Lloyd Cruz, Bea Alonzo and John Estrada. It aired on the network's Primetime Bida line up and worldwide on TFC from October 29, 2012 to January 18, 2013, replacing Walang Hanggan and was replaced by Kailangan Ko'y Ikaw. The drama revolves around two lost souls who meet and fall in love in the city of Vienna in Austria.

== Overview ==
=== Background ===
A Beautiful Affair is the highly anticipated drama series celebrating Bea Alonzo and John Lloyd Cruz's 10th anniversary as an on-screen love team. According to series director, Katski Flores, the drama began as a film concept in 2007 inspired loosely by Camelot and The Fountainhead. The drama was first hinted by ABS-CBN in November 2011 as a blind item, however several articles were released a month later from various sources confirming this. The drama is produced under the unit of Laurenti Dyogi and directed by Katski Flores whose first work on television was headwriting Cruz and Alonzo's first drama together titled, Kay Tagal Kang Hinintay back in 2002. Filming began on May 16, 2012 in Vienna and Salzburg, Austria. With its high budget, the drama filmed internationally for the second time in Japan in December 2012.

=== Premise ===
Leon (John Lloyd Cruz) is an architect who loses the will to live after his mother's death. In Vienna, he meets Gen (Bea Alonzo) a woman who suffers from a broken heart after finding out that her fiancé was cheating on her. Hoping to reclaim themselves and move on from their painful past, they venture to find love and romance. However, due to certain circumstances, they decide to part ways. A year later, fate brings them together again, but unbeknownst to Leon, Gen is already in love with another man who happens to be his adoptive brother, Edward (John Estrada) and is set to marry her.

== Cast and characters ==
=== Main cast ===
- John Lloyd Cruz as Napoleon "Leon" Riego
- Bea Alonzo as Genevieve "Gen" Saavedra
- John Estrada as Edward Pierro

=== Supporting cast ===
- Eula Valdez as Carlotta Pierro
- Dimples Romana as Emilia "Emy" Biglang-awa
- Megan Young as Ava Pierro
- Jaime Fabregas as Arturo Pierro
- John Arcilla as Leopoldo "Epong" Riego
- Ana Roces as Natalia Saavedra
- Janus del Prado as Fred Macatangay
- Regine Tolentino as Sophia Imperial
- Erika Padilla as Dr. Trina Cawagas
- Angelina Kanapi as Sabrina Saavedra-Reyes
- Sandy Aloba as Mona
- Slater Young as Harry Reyes
- Bugoy Cariño as Ivan
- Maria Anna Krynessa Rivera as Lala

=== Guest cast ===
- Menggie Cobarrubias as Julio Santillian
- Maliksi Morales as Ferdie Macatangay
- Edward Mendez as Martin Santillian
- Lito Pimentel as Rex Resureccion
- Bing Davao as Venicio
- Jason Francisco as Nelson
- Tetchie Agbayani as Tala
- Matthew Mendoza as Winston
- Beverly Salviejo as Ason
- Ricardo Cepeda as Akira Yamamoto
- Miki Tokugawa as a Japanese tea ceremony teacher

=== Special participation ===
- Maritoni Fernandez as Evelyn Saavedra
- Allan Paule as Henry Lumayang
- Jim Paredes as Stephen Saavedra
- Tanya Gomez as Rosario "Osang" Riego
- Carlo Romero as Jake Montgomery
- Andre Garcia as young Leon
- Alexa Ilacad as young Gen

== Soundtrack ==
A Beautiful Affair: Original Soundtrack

- Artist: Various
- Released: 2012
- Label: Star Records
- Language: Filipino, English
- Format: Studio album (CD)
- Genre: OPM, Ballad

=== Track list and duration ===
1. After All – Martin Nievera & Vina Morales – 4:37
2. I'll Take Care Of You – Richard Poon – 4:20
3. Ikaw At Ako – Johnoy Danao – 5:10
4. Akala Mo – Juris – 3:53
5. Wag Kanang Umiyak – KZ Tandingan – 4:40
6. Paano Ba Ang Magmahal? – Erik Santos & Liezel Garcia – 4:27
7. After All – Yeng Constantino & Sam Milby – 3:57
8. Naaalala Ka – John Lloyd Cruz & Bea Alonzo – 4:22

Total running time: 35:26

== See also ==
- List of programs broadcast by ABS-CBN
- List of ABS-CBN Studios original drama series
