= Maging Sino Ka Man (2006 TV series) =

2006–07 Philippine television drama series

- Title card
- Also known as: More Than Love
- Genre: Melodrama; Romance
- Created by: ABS-CBN Studios
- Written by: Shaira Mella; Generiza F. Reyez; Ricardo P. Fernando III
- Directed by: Romilla Balmaceda; FM Reyes; Mae Cruz-Alviar
- Starring: John Lloyd Cruz; Bea Alonzo; Anne Curtis; Sam Milby
- Theme music composer: Rey Valera
- Opening theme: "Maging Sino Ka Man" by Erik Santos
- Country of origin: Philippines
- Original language: Tagalog
- No. of episodes: 164

Production
- Executive producers: Carlo Katigbak; Cory Vidanes; Laurenti Dyogi; Ginny Monteagudo-Ocampo; Malou Santos
- Producers: Narciso Y. Gulmatico, Jr.
- Running time: 25–30 minutes
- Production company: Star Creatives

Original release
- Network: ABS-CBN
- Release: October 9, 2006 – May 25, 2007

Related
- Maging Sino Ka Man: Ang Pagbabalik

Maging Sino Ka Man (translated: Whoever You May Be; international title: More Than Love) is a Philippine romantic television drama series broadcast by ABS-CBN. It was directed by FM Reyes, Romilla Balmaceda, and Mae Cruz-Alviar, and it stars John Lloyd Cruz, Bea Alonzo, Anne Curtis, and Sam Milby. It aired on the network's Primetime Bida lineup and worldwide on TFC from October 9, 2006, to May 25, 2007, replacing Bituing Walang Ningning and later replaced by Which Star Are You From.

A sequel, Maging Sino Ka Man: Ang Pagbabalik, aired from December 10, 2007, until March 28, 2008.

== Cast and characters ==
Actor	Character	Character Description
John Lloyd Cruz	Gabriel "Eli" H. Roxas	Eli is a hard-working man from a poor family who believes that love can overcome any adversity. An accident and a brutal discovery leads him to reclaim his birthright.
Bea Alonzo	Jacqueline "Jackie" Madrigal-Roxas / Princess	The unica hija (only daughter) of a banking magnate, Jackie is the opposite of Eli in terms of status. She tries to be the perfect daughter and girlfriend to JB, but an accident leads her to self-discovery.
Anne Curtis	Celine Magsaysay Berenguer	Celine projects a tough exterior but carries sorrow from her past heartbreak.
Sam Milby	Jaime "JB" R. Berenguer	JB, heir to the Roxas Shipping empire, desires his mother's approval. He has a seemingly perfect life but longs for freedom.
Christopher de Leon	Don Fidel Madrigal	Don Fidel Madrigal is Jackie's father and a wealthy banking magnate embittered by perceived betrayal from the women in his life. He now pursues peace at any cost.
Chin-Chin Gutierrez	Corazon Roxas-Berenguer	Corazon is JB's mother and Gloria's older sister. As the matriarch of the Roxas Shipping family, she carries resentment from her dark past. She yearns for inner peace.
Irma Adlawan	Imelda Magsaysay	Imelda is Fidel's younger half-sister and Celine's mother. Despite her family's wealth, she feels unfulfilled.
Bing Pimentel	Monique Madrigal	Monique is Fidel's ex-wife and Jackie's estranged mother. She hopes for reconciliation with her daughter.
Glenda Garcia	Gloria Hidalgo-Roxas	As Corazon's younger sister, JB's aunt, and Eli's mother, Gloria is JB's confidante despite her eccentricities. She suffered from shock and mutism until reunited with her son, Eli.
Dick Israel	Diosdado "Dadoods" Davide	Dadoods is Eli's adoptive father. He is a fisherman who prioritizes his family's well-being. He struggles with illness and the burden that it places on his sons.
Smokey Manaloto	Apolinario "Pong" Davide	Pong is Eli's older brother. He sacrifices his own education to support Eli's, but makes a desperate decision with dire consequences.

=== Secondary cast ===
Actor	Character	Character Notes
Ramon Zamora	Simo	Jackie and Eli’s friend
Malou de Guzman	Bebeng	Jackie and Eli’s friend
Keanna Reeves	Guada	Friend of Jackie and Eli
Ricci Chan	Gio	Celine's friend
Marissa Delgado	Eloisa Davide	Eli and Pong's mother
Debraliz Valasote	Miriam	Fidel's secretary
Izza Ignacio	Heidi	Jackie's nanny
Vice Ganda	Joko	Toni's best friend
Soliman Cruz	Oca	The antagonist
Mario Magalona	Big Boy	Eli and Pong's adversary
Denise Laurel	Kalay	Eli's classmate
Baron Geisler	Kevin Romero	Celine's client
Ryan Eigenmann	Brian Antonio	Celine's deceased husband
Michelle Madrigal	Yvette Ramos	Eli's business partner
Bembol Roco	Tomas Arroyo	Corazon's second husband
Phillip Salvador	Samuel Romualdez	JB's mentor
Angelica Panganiban	Lena	Special participation
Rosanna Roces	Lena's mother	Special participation
Jiro Manio	Young Pong	Special participation
Eliza Pineda	Young Jackie	Special participation
CJ Navato	Young Eli	Special participation

- Eloisa Davide (portrayed by Marissa Delgado) appeared only in flashbacks and dream sequences.
- Per COMELEC airtime rules, Christopher de Leon's character (Fidel Madrigal) was temporarily written out by sending him to the United States while the actor campaigned for vice governor of Batangas in the 2007 elections.

== Plot ==
The series follows the intertwined lives of two couples: Eli and Jackie, and JB and Celine. After Jackie loses her memory in an accident, she comes to believe that Eli is her husband and falls in love with him. Eli, however, struggles to maintain the deception. Meanwhile, Celine and JB's developing romance is complicated by JB's past relationship with Jackie and Jackie's unresolved feelings for him. When Jackie eventually regains her memory, it leads to further complications and shifting relationships. The story explores themes of love, betrayal, family secrets, and social class differences.

== Theme song ==
The series theme song is also entitled "Maging Sino Ka Man," and is composed by Rey Valera. The song was previously recorded by both Sharon Cuneta and Rey Valera, while the TV series theme was performed by Erik Santos. A version of the song performed by Martin Nievera was later used in Juan dela Cruz (2013), another ABS-CBN drama series.

== Accolades ==
The series received several awards, including Best Drama Series, Best Actor, and Best Actress at the 2007 U.S.T.V. Students' Choice Awards. It also won Best Primetime TV Series at the 2007 PMPC Star Awards.
