= One More Chance (2007 film) =

- Theatrical movie poster
- Directed by: Cathy Garcia-Molina
- Written by: Vanessa R. Valdez; Carmi G. Raymundo
- Produced by: Charo Santos-Concio; Malou N. Santos
- Starring: John Lloyd Cruz; Bea Alonzo
- Cinematography: Manuel Teehankee
- Edited by: Marya Ignacio
- Music by: Jessie Lasaten
- Production company: Star Cinema
- Distributed by: ABS-CBN Film Productions
- Release date: November 14, 2007
- Running time: 115 minutes
- Country: Philippines
- Language: Filipino
- Box office: ₱152.7 million

One More Chance is a 2007 Filipino romantic drama film directed by Cathy Garcia-Molina from a story and screenplay written by Vanessa R. Valdez and Carmi Raymundo. Starring John Lloyd Cruz and Bea Alonzo, the story follows Popoy and Basha, who have been lovers since their college days, and they became a couple. Suddenly, as they try to maintain their relationship, they misunderstand each other due to their ambitions in life. The two will find ways to repair their love, as it is almost broken apart.

Produced and distributed by ABS-CBN Film Productions, the film was theatrically released on November 14, 2007, and grossed over ₱152.7 million nationwide, making it a box-office success and earning several year-end accolades. A sequel, A Second Chance, was released in November 2015. The 4K digital remaster of the film was released through iTunes on September 14, 2015, and had a limited theatrical run on October 4, 2017. In 2024, the Philippine Educational Theater Association released a jukebox musical adaptation featuring the songs of Ben&Ben.

== Plot ==
College sweethearts Popoy and Basha work at the same construction firm, but their relationship becomes strained after five years due to Popoy's controlling nature. Basha feels suffocated by Popoy's domineering behavior and decides to break up with him, resigning from the firm as well. Popoy struggles to move on despite the support of his friends, meeting Trisha, a bar singer, but eventually spirals out of control. Meanwhile, Basha seeks to rediscover herself and finds professional and creative freedom in a new job offered by another architect, Mark.

When Mark drives Basha to a dinner party as a friendly gesture after being absent for nearly three months, Popoy misunderstands their relationship and thinks they are a couple, leading to tension. Later, Popoy and Basha are in better places: Popoy is now with Trisha, and Basha is thriving in her career. Popoy's aunt, Edith, and her fiancé, Willie, return from the United States, wanting Popoy and Basha to fulfill their promise of building their dream house together. This forces Popoy and Basha to work closely, and while they remain civil, their proximity rekindles some feelings in both.

The circumstances surrounding their mutual friends push Popoy and Basha to face more pain and anger about their breakup. When Basha delivers the final design plans for Edith and Willie's house to Popoy's apartment, she apologizes for breaking his heart, and they end up spending the night together. At Mark's wedding, Basha expresses regret over hurting Popoy, and Mark reassures her that breaking up was the right decision, as couples sometimes need to grow independently. Meanwhile, Trisha realizes Popoy has not moved on from Basha. Popoy admits he still loves Basha despite being in a relationship with Trisha, leading to their breakup.

Popoy turns to his friends, Krizzy and Kenneth, who help him realize that his breakup with Basha was hard on both of them. They point out that Basha bravely faced the problems in their relationship. Popoy admits he never stopped loving Basha but wonders if love is enough. Later, Popoy and Basha meet at their old university, and Popoy shares that he is going to Qatar for a two-year work contract. He reveals that Trisha broke up with him, and Basha apologizes. Popoy admits he should be the one apologizing for not giving her what she needed. He decides to find himself and what he lost in his heartbreak. They part as friends.

Two years later, Basha is seen working at a construction site when Popoy approaches her and asks her out for coffee and dinner. Basha accepts.

== Cast ==
=== Main cast ===
- John Lloyd Cruz as Popoy
- Bea Alonzo as Basha

=== Supporting cast ===
- Derek Ramsay as Mark
- Maja Salvador as Trisha
- Lauren Young as Bernice
- Dimples Romana as Krizzy
- Bea Saw as Anj
- James Blanco as Kenneth
- Janus del Prado as Chinno
- Ahron Villena as JP
- Nanette Inventor as Nanay Edith
- Al Tantay as Tito Willie
- Bodjie Pascua as Sir Bert
- Nikki Gil as Helen
- Melissa Mendez as Elvie
- Shamaine Buencamino as Rose
- Robert Woods as Francis
- Gee Canlas as Cathy

== Reception ==
=== Accolades ===
Accolades received by One More Chance
Award	Category	Recipient(s)	Result	Ref.
38th GMMSF Box-Office Entertainment Awards	Box-Office King	John Lloyd Cruz	Won	
38th GMMSF Box-Office Entertainment Awards	Box-Office Queen	Bea Alonzo	Won	
38th GMMSF Box-Office Entertainment Awards	Most Popular Film Director	Cathy Garcia Molina	Won	
38th GMMSF Box-Office Entertainment Awards	Most Popular Screenwriters	Carmi Raymundo and Vanessa Valdez	Won	
5th ENPRESS Golden Screen Awards	Best Performance by an Actor in a Lead Role (Drama)	John Lloyd Cruz	Won	
24th PMPC Star Awards for Movies	Movie Director of the Year	Cathy Garcia-Molina	Won	
24th PMPC Star Awards for Movies	Movie of the Year	One More Chance	Won	
24th PMPC Star Awards for Movies	Movie Editor of the Year	Marya Ignacio (Technical Director)	Won	
24th PMPC Star Awards for Movies	Movie Cinematographer of the Year	Manuel Teehankee	Won	

== Legacy ==
The continued popularity of One More Chance among Filipino audiences since the film's release led to a novel adaptation that was released in June 2015. Two months later, Star Cinema confirmed that a sequel to the film would be released. The sequel, A Second Chance, was released on November 25, 2015, with Garcia-Molina returning as director, and Cruz and Alonzo reprising their roles. A musical adaptation was announced in January 2024 and ran from April 12 to June 16.

In the 2014 movie That Thing Called Tadhana, the final scene of the movie appeared on an airplane scene; Angelica Panganiban's character tries to stop a flight attendant from giving her a tissue, saying "Hindi ko kailangan ng tissue. I don't need tissue! Please stop judging me!" ("I don't need it. I. Don't. Need. Tissue. So please stop judging me!").

On April 12, 2024, Philippine Educational Theater Association, with co-presenters Robinsons Malls and Metrobank, produced One More Chance, The Musical, the theatrical adaptation of One More Chance that features the songs of the 9-piece folk-pop band Ben&Ben.
