= It Might Be You (TV series) =

Philippine television drama series

- Title card
- Genre: Drama; Romance
- Created by: ABS-CBN Studios
- Developed by: ABS-CBN Studios; Star Cinema
- Written by: Ricky Lee
- Directed by: Don M. Cuaresma; Gilbert G. Perez
- Starring: John Lloyd Cruz; Bea Alonzo
- Theme music composer: Dave Grusin; Alan & Marilyn Bergman
- Opening theme: "It Might Be You" by Michelle Ayalde and Erik Santos
- Country of origin: Philippines
- Original language: Filipino
- No. of episodes: 263

Production
- Executive producer: Grace Bodegan-Casimsiman
- Production locations: Metro Manila; Clark Freeport Zone, Angeles City; Lubao, Pampanga
- Running time: 30 minutes (original); 45 minutes (compressed)
- Production company: Star Creatives

Original release
- Network: ABS-CBN
- Release: December 8, 2003 – December 10, 2004

It Might Be You is a Philippine television drama romance series broadcast by ABS-CBN. Directed by Don M. Cuaresma and Gilbert G. Perez, it stars John Lloyd Cruz and Bea Alonzo. It aired on the network's Primetime Bida line up and worldwide on TFC from December 8, 2003 to December 10, 2004, replacing Meteor Fever in Manila and was replaced by Spirits.

== Premise ==
In the small town of Montegracia, politics are in disarray, but amidst the stifling competition for power, a special friendship blossoms between the mayor's son, Lawrence Trinidad and an impoverished orphan, Cielo San Carlos.

Although they come from wildly different social backgrounds, their friendship grows into an unlikely romance; Lawrence and Cielo realize that love is not all roses and moonlight, especially when they discover harrowing realities about their families and a dark past. Throughout their complex lives, Lawrence and Cielo hold fast to their love.

== Cast and characters ==
=== Protagonists ===
- John Lloyd Cruz as Earl Lawrence M. Trinidad
- Bea Alonzo as Cielo San Carlos / Cielo Lacuesta

=== Main cast ===
- John Prats as Gian Carlo Pablo / Gian Carlo Lacuesta
- Maja Salvador as Cara Victorino
- Tirso Cruz III as Ernesto Trinidad
- Maritoni Fernandez as Frida Montegracia-Trinidad
- Jean Garcia as Orlanda Mae "Ola" Lacuesta
- Gardo Versoza as Camilo San Carlos
- Sarsi Emmanuelle as Guadalupe "Lupe" San Carlos
- Bodjie Pascua as Eseng San Carlos
- Lani Mercado as Farrah / Nena
- Baron Geisler as Derek Castro

=== Recurring cast ===
- Kathryn Bernardo as young Cielo
- King Alcala as young Lawrence
- Isabel Oli as Aretha
- Marco Alcaraz as Axel
- Pia Wurtzbach as Allison / Mary Lou
- Mico Palanca as Romer
- Susan Africa as Margaret
- Toby Alejar
- Gio Alvarez as Ebony
- Lui Villaruz as Ivory
- Nanding Josef as Johnny Pablo
- Sarita Perez de Tagle as Britney
- Bianca Lapus as Eloise
- Lynn Sherman as Lolita
- Vanna Garcia
- Katherine Luna
- Dick Israel as Bruno
- Isay Alvarez as Sister Flor
- Beth Tamayo as Sister Hannah

== See also ==
- List of programs aired by ABS-CBN
- List of ABS-CBN drama series
