= I Love Betty La Fea =

2008–09 Philippine television drama series

- Genre: Drama, Comedy
- Created by: ABS-CBN Studios
- Based on: Yo soy Betty, la fea by Fernando Gaitán
- Developed by: ABS-CBN Studios; Roldeo T. Endrinal
- Written by: Danica Mae Domingo; Joel Mercado
- Directed by: Erick C. Salud; Don M. Cuaresma; Claudio "Tots" Sanchez-Mariscal IV
- Starring: Bea Alonzo; John Lloyd Cruz
- Opening theme: "Kagandahan" by Mau Marcelo, Frenchie Dy & Poy Palma (original: Filipina Trio)
- Ending theme: "Mahal Naman Kita" by Nikki Gil
- Country of origin: Philippines
- Original languages: Filipino, English
- No. of episodes: 163

Production
- Executive producers: Roldeo T. Endrinal; Darnel Joy Villaflor
- Producer: Julie Anne R. Benitez
- Production locations: Quezon City, Philippines
- Cinematography: Alfredo Hernando; George Tutanes
- Running time: 30-45 minutes
- Production companies: Dreamscape Entertainment Television; RCN Televisión

Original release
- Network: ABS-CBN
- Release: September 8, 2008 – April 24, 2009

Related
- Yo soy Betty, la fea

I Love Betty La Fea (stylized as I ♥ Betty La Fea) is a Philippine television drama series broadcast by ABS-CBN. The series is based on the Colombian telenovela Yo soy Betty, la fea. Directed by Erick C. Salud, Don M. Cuaresma and Claudio "Tots" Sanchez-Mariscal IV, it stars Bea Alonzo and John Lloyd Cruz. It aired on the network's Primetime Bida line up and worldwide on TFC from September 8, 2008 to April 24, 2009, replacing The Singing Bee and My Girl and was replaced by Only You.

== Plot ==
Beatriz Pengson, or simply Betty, is an aesthetically challenged career-oriented girl who happens to work in a posh advertising agency known as Ecomoda Manila. In an industry where everyone thrives on beauty and perfection, her lack of good looks and outdated sense of fashion make her an instant outcast among her superficial colleagues. Despite her shortcomings, Betty's capabilities and innate kindheartedness have gained her a set of loyal friends.

Betty's lackluster life, however, takes a turn for the better (or is it for worse?) when she meets the man of her dreams, Armando Solis, the President of Ecomoda Manila. How will Betty catch the elusive heart of someone who's way out of her league? Is it possible that a good-looking guy like Armando will eventually fall in love with a certified ugly duckling?

== Cast and characters ==
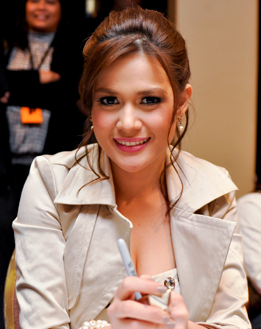
Bea Alonzo portrays Beatrice "Betty" Pengson/Beatrice Tingson/Trish Martinez (during the "Aldo" arc of the show)

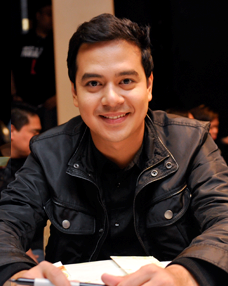
John Lloyd Cruz portrays Armando Solis

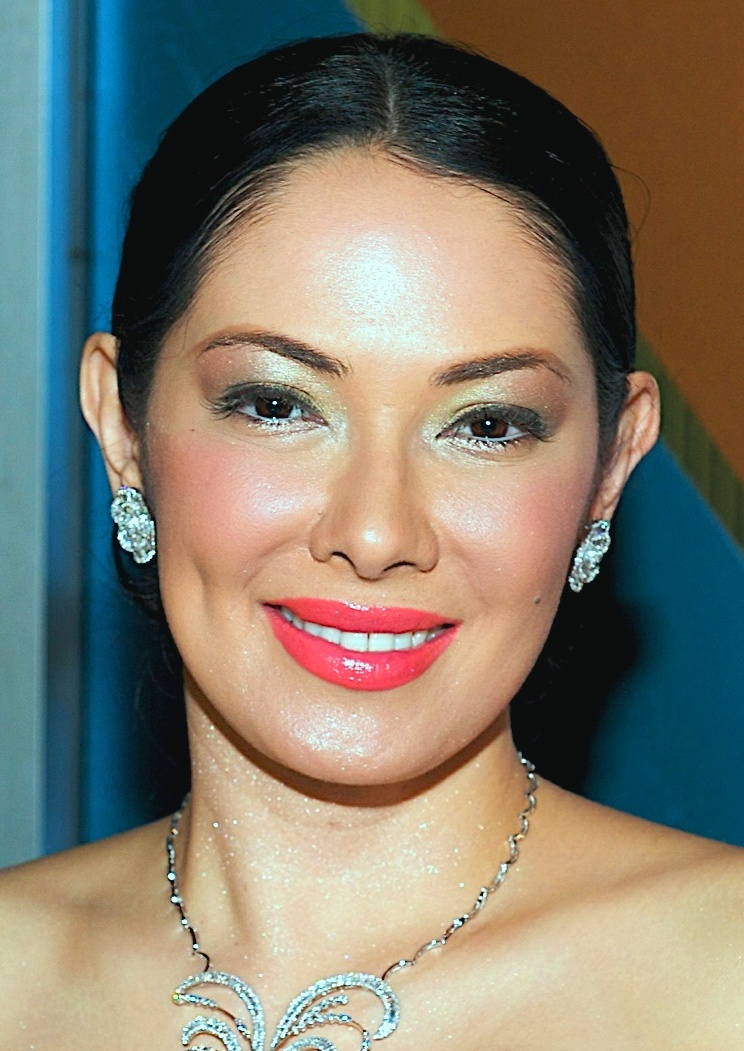
Ruffa Gutierrez portrays Daniella Valencia (Solis).

=== Main cast ===
- Bea Alonzo as Herself / Beatrice "Betty" Pengson / Trish Martinez (during the "Aldo" arc of the show); in reality Beatrice Tingson (Beatriz Aurora "Betty" Pinzón Solano) - Her intellectual capabilities and excellent organizational skills make her the perfect secretary for any top brass executive. The problem lies in her odd appearance which has always been a butt of jokes amongst her officemates. Yet not even such harsh treatment can deter her from achieving her goals and from being a nice girl towards other people.
- John Lloyd Cruz as Armando Solis (Armando Mendoza Sáenz) - He is the epitome of a sophisticated and adventurous bachelor who remains a certified ladies’ man despite his soon-to-be-married status with his possessive girlfriend, Marcella. But the truth is that Armando has no choice but to give in to all her demands because their families are co-founders and owners of the company where he works for as the President.

=== Supporting cast ===
- Vhong Navarro as Nicholas "Kulas" Mora (Nicolas Mora) - One can easily single him out in a crowd because of his attention-getting nerdy fashion sense: high-waist pants, checkered polo shirt, and suspenders. Coupled with his weird personality, Nicholas is indeed the exact male counterpart of his best friend Betty La Fea. It is his fervent wish to win the heart of his dream girl Patricia.
- Ai-Ai delas Alas as Julia Pengson; in reality Julia Tingson (Julia Solano Galindo de Pinzón) - She plans to work as a domestic helper in London to provide a better life for her family. But her children eventually persuade her to stay especially when Betty gets her first job in Eco Moda.
- Ruffa Gutierrez as Daniella Valencia (Solis) (gender-swapped Marcela/Daniel Valencia/Wilhelmina Slater) - She is the main antagonist of the series. As the SVP of the ad agency co-owned by her family with the Solis, it is her job to make sure that everything is under control in Eco Moda Manila. Her distrust towards Armando's capabilities, however, often creates a rift between them. Knowing that he's the fiancé of her younger sister only intensifies her belief that he's nothing but a first-class gigolo. Eventually in the series, it became clear that her motives are mainly of revenge.
- Megan Young as Marcella Valencia (Marcela Valencia) - For someone who's born with a silver spoon on her mouth, Marcella is used to getting everything she wants. As a result, her boyfriend suffers the most because of her domineering attitude similar to that of Daniella. Since she's aware of his womanizing ways, she keeps him under her beck and call at all times.
- Ronaldo Valdez as Hermes Pengson; in reality Herminio "Miniong" Tingson (Hermes Pinzón Galarza) - As a father, he believes that his daughter can be whoever she wants to be because she's an intelligent young lady. He is also very protective of Betty when it comes to “potential suitors” like Nicholas or Armando.
- Sam Concepcion as Andrew Pengson; in reality Andrew Tingson (original character with some resemblance to Justin Suarez from Ugly Betty) - At first glance, you'd think that he's just a happy-go-lucky kid who's only out for some fun and excitement. But in truth, he's a loving son who always wants the best for the Pengson family.
- Wendy Valdez as Patricia Suarez (Patricia Fernández de Brickman) - A rival secretary of Betty, she always creates mean and comedic schemes to get rid of her. Patricia is very attractive and sexy on the outside, but is shown to be shallow and an air-head. She wears flamboyant clothes and openly flaunts how proud she is of her beauty.
- Joem Bascon as Mario Collantes (Mario Calderón) - Despite his bad influence towards Armando when it comes to women, he nevertheless remains a loyal best friend to him. As the VP for Creatives, he closely works with Hugo and Randy for their various events and ad campaigns. Patricia is quite attracted to him, but he ignores her advances.
- Thou Reyes as Hugo Bosinio (Hugo Lombardi) - Because he is a creative genius, he gets away with his annoying sarcasm when talking to the bigwigs including Armando's father, Roberto. He's a perfectionist who always wants the best out of every ad campaign that he makes. Yet despite his aversion to ugly people like Betty, he can also be nice when he wants to.

=== Recurring cast ===
- Sheryn Regis as Kylie Torres
- Leo Rialp as Roberto Solis (Roberto Mendoza)
- Pilar Pilapil as Elvira Valencia
- Randolf Stamatelaky as Randy
- Ronnie Liang as Enrique
- Marvin Yap as Bart
- Lloyd Zaragoza as Roman (Román)
- Jojo Alejar as Macario (Gustavo Olarte)
- Princess Ryan as Rose
- Myrene Ramos as Snow

== Guesting Cast by Chapter ==
=== Chapter One: Young ===
The story starts from Betty, Andrew, Nicholas, and Armando's childhood.

- Noemi Oineza as young Betty Pengson (young Beatrice Tingson)
- Zaijan Jaranilla as young Nicholas Mora
- Carlo Lacana as young Armando Solis
- Angel Jacob as Susan Solis (deceased; only seen in flashbacks and photographs)
- Timothy Chan as young Andrew Pengson (young Andrew Tingson)
- Christian Vasquez as young Roberto Solis

=== Chapter Two: Work ===
Betty gets a job and becomes president of Ecomoda Manila.

- Alessandra De Rossi as Cristina Larson (Karina Larson)
- Cheska Ortega as Janice - Andrew's friend
- Gloria Romero as Doray
- Rafael Rosell as Jeremy
- Nan Clenuar as Mickey
- Bam Romana as Donald
- Regine Angeles as Paula
- John Prats as Drake
- Riza Santos as Amanda
- Arnold Reyes
- Guji Lorenzana (as Guji Lorenzano), Lance Christopher, Michaela Melania, Erika Padilla, Enrique Gil, Heidi Riego, Jubail Andres, and Kristina Snell as Ecomodels
- Kent Howell as John Edward Molina
- Savannah Lamsen as Sarah Octacio
- Jason Gainza as Adolfo Robles (Saúl Gutiérrez)

=== Chapter Three: Date ===
Betty gets a date with some boys. Meanwhile, Nicholas makes a magazine called the B Magazine.

- Meryll Soriano as Maria Rosario "Rose" Sanchez
- Sheryn Regis as Kylie Torres
- Kristel Moreno as Jen
- Arlene Tolibas as Celina "Cely" Perez
- CJ Jaravata as Clarita Flores
- Sammy Villaresis as Caloy
- Flora Gaser as Floring
- Ryan Nemro Bontia as Fred (Freddy Stewart Contreras)
- Maricar Reyes as Candy (full name: Candida Silverio)
- Xyriel Manabat as young Marcella
- Julia Montes as young Daniella

=== Chapter Four: New ===
Betty's dad Hermes Tingson suffers a heart attack. Betty breaks up with Armando. So Betty entered the "New You" contest and try to renew her ugly face.

- Candy Pangilinan as Catalina Dominguez (Catalina Ángel)
- Pooh as Eda
- Ron Morales as Jules
- Vicki Belo as herself

=== Chapter Five: Hope ===
Betty falls from the boat with the party. When her body reaches the shore, a mysterious man kissed her and this man was Aldo, where Betty stayed in Batangas. Betty had a new business in Villa Olivia. Daniella got arrested but later sets free easily. So Betty also stayed in a new house. When Betty went back to Manila, she became president of Ecomoda Manila. Meanwhile, Candy suffers breast cancer and joint pains and later died.

- Archie Alemania as Johnny
- Baron Geisler as Ian
- Minnie Aguilar as Matilda
- Benjie Felipe as Tomas
- Jericho Rosales as Romualdo "Aldo" Alcantara (Michell Doinel; also Aldo Domenzaín from the Mexican version)
- Pops Fernandez as Paulina
- Karylle as Olivia

Returning Characters

- Maricar Reyes as Candy

=== Chapter Six: Revenge ===
Betty and Armando were about to get married but Roberto and Daniella suspects the Pengson family for killing Susan Solis and ordered Hermes to be arrested. Roberto then kicks them out of his house.

- Lito Legaspi as Virgilio Arellano
- Matthew Mendoza as young Hermes
- Gerald Madrid as young Virgilio

=== Final Chapter: Generations ===
Since the Pengson and the Solis Family found out that the criminal was Elvira Valencia, Virgilio Arellano was set free. Betty and Armando finally get married. Betty and Armando give birth and Patricia and Nicholas starts a family.

- Barbie Sabino as Bettina, the daughter of Betty and Armando.
- Kyle Balili as Patrick, the son of Nicolas and Patricia.

== Production ==
It had originally been reported that the Philippine version of "Yo soy Betty, La Fea" was going to be called "Betty Na Mas Pangit" (The Uglier Betty), but eventually the title was revealed to be "I Love Betty La Fea" instead.

The series was set to debut in September 2008 with Bea Alonzo in the lead role. Early reports claimed that this Betty will be fatter and uglier than the other versions, and the story might be a mix of elements from the various other international adaptations.

The official announcement of Alonzo's hiring ended a long period of casting speculation, during which actress/singer/TV host Toni Gonzaga and her frequent co-star Sam Milby were mentioned for the lead roles of Betty and Armando. Before Gonzaga's name was attached, it had previously been reported that Regine Velasquez wanted to leave the GMA Network to star in a reported musical adaptation of "Betty la fea" for rival network ABS-CBN, who bought the Philippine rights to the Colombian telenovela.

Ultimately, though, she chose to stay with GMA Network, so the lead part was put up for grabs again. After Velasquez chose to stay with GMA Network, the names of a handful of ABS-CBN stars were then mentioned for the plum role, including Valerie Concepcion, Mariel Rodriguez, Bianca Gonzalez, Anne Curtis, Toni Gonzaga, and Bea Alonzo.

People in the know insisted that the plum part would most likely go to Anne Curtis, who had plenty of practice playing the Ugly Duckling in "Kampanerang Kuba", as a reward for not moving back to GMA-7, but Gonzaga supposedly ended up winning the coveted role. The false news of Gonzaga and Milby's casting was probably derived from descriptions of their upcoming movie, My Big Love, in which Milby wears a fat suit and Gonzaga's character falls in love with him unconditionally, despite his appearance.

After the role of Betty was cast, inquiring minds once again focused on who would play the male lead role. Fans speculated that the part would go to Jon Avila, Luis Manzano, Piolo Pascual, Jake Cuenca, Aga Muhlach, or Bea Alonzo's frequent co-star, John Lloyd Cruz, who led all online polls as the Armando of choice for a large majority of fans.

On Monday, June 30, 2008, ABS-CBN aired a teaser music video (to the tune of Mika's "Hey Betty, You are Beautiful", which was originally recorded for the U.S. version, "Ugly Betty") during a primetime telenovela called "My Girl". The video introduced Betty and some of the show's other characters, such as Armando's business rival, Daniella (Ruffa Gutierrez); Betty's childhood friend, Nicolas (Vhong Navarro); Betty's doting parents, Julia (Ai Ai delas Alas) and Hermes (Ronaldo Valdez); Betty's little brother, Andrew (Sam Concepcion); and about a dozen others. The only notable character missing from the clip was the male lead himself, Armando, who still had not been cast at the time the teaser aired. Ironically, the clip was introduced by Toni Gonzaga, who had been a top contender for the role of Betty. Apparently, the early reports that this Betty would be fatter and uglier than other Bettys were false. Not only Betty is not fat, she is not particularly ugly either.

In this version, the workplace is not a fashion house or a glossy magazine, but an advertising agency called Ecomoda Manila, or EM. In early August 2008, the internet rumor mill was naming Piolo Pascual as the show's Armando. When questioned about the casting rumors, Pascual only said that in deference to the producers' desire for secrecy, he could not comment on the matter. Like many of the previous casting rumors, this one was shortly proven to be false when it was finally revealed, with much fanfare on August 17, that Bea Alonzo would once again be reunited with her regular romantic male lead, John Lloyd Cruz, much to the relief and delight of the staunch fans of this popular pairing.

It was the top show when May Bukas Pa and Tayong Dalawa has not been aired. Later, it had been in a very strong second place.

=== The Bettyful Finale ===
The final episode, which aired on April 24, 2009, got 41.3% in National TV Ratings conducted by TNS Media Research making the number one TV show on that day.

This is the only version of the Betty franchise where Betty never had a make over. In this version, she decided to embrace her inner beauty instead of trying to be beautiful.

== Awards and nominations ==
- 5th USTV Students' Choice Awards- Best Daily Soap Opera
- Ateneo de Davao's TAO Awards 2009 - Favorite Soap Opera
- Bea Alonzo won as best actress in the 1st MTRCB award.
- John Lloyd Cruz won as best actor in a daily soap opera in 5th USTV Students' Choice Awards.

== See also ==
- List of programs broadcast by ABS-CBN
- Yo soy Betty, la fea
