= Kay Tagal Kang Hinintay =

- Title card
- Also known as: The Long Wait
- Genre: Romantic drama
- Created by: ABS-CBN Studios
- Developed by: ABS-CBN Studios; Star Cinema
- Directed by: Olivia M. Lamasan; Laurenti M. Dyogi
- Starring: Lorna Tolentino; John Lloyd Cruz; Rica Peralejo; John Estrada; Edu Manzano; Jean Garcia; Ronnie Lazaro; Johnny Delgado; Bea Alonzo; Bernard Palanca; Dimples Romana; Bing Loyzaga; Ricky Davao; Shaina Magdayao; Alwyn Uytingco; Jhong Hilario
- Opening theme: "Sana'y Maghintay ang Walang Hanggan" by Zsa Zsa Padilla
- Composers: Willy Cruz; Baby Gil
- Country of origin: Philippines
- Original language: Filipino
- No. of episodes: 353

Production
- Executive producer: Annaliza A. Goma
- Running time: 30 minutes (original); 45 minutes (compressed)
- Production company: Star Creatives

Original release
- Network: ABS-CBN
- Release: July 8, 2002 – November 14, 2003

Kay Tagal Kang Hinintay (transl. i've waited for you for so long") is a Philippine television drama series broadcast by ABS-CBN. It stars Lorna Tolentino and John Lloyd Cruz, together with Bea Alonzo, Rica Peralejo and John Estrada. It aired on the network's Teleserye Primetime Bida line up from July 8, 2002 to November 14, 2003, replacing Game Ka Na Ba? and was replaced by Meteor Fever in Manila.

The critically-acclaimed drama won the CMMA Best Drama Series and the PMPC Star Awards Best Primetime Drama Series. It is the first Philippine television series to be nominated in any program genre category at the International Emmy Awards.

The series is available via iWant with a total of 130 episodes and on YouTube but with only 10 original episodes published.

== Synopsis ==
Lorrea and Lorrinda Guinto (Lorna Tolentino) are twins. Lorrea accidentally takes the place of her twin sister in the world of the drug lords. After many trials and tribulations she finds her missing son, Andrei/Yuri (John Lloyd Cruz).

== Plot ==
The story revolves around twins Lorrea and Lorrinda Guinto (both portrayed by Lorna Tolentino). Lorrea grows up feeling abandoned by her mother (Perla Bautista) who loves Lorrinda more. Lorrea does all that she can to save her family from a series of events that threaten to tear the family apart. This includes her rape at the hands of Francis Ventaspejo (Ricky Davao) who lives in the same village and hometown. Lorrea has a child and names him Andrei but she loses him. She tries to get him back but is, in the process, blamed for murdering Francis' father. A remorseful Francis enters the seminary and becomes a priest.

As she is thrown in jail by the powerful family Lorrea comes face to face with Lorrinda who offers to help her escape. To do so, Lorrea must enter the world of the drug lords as a step mother and wife to Henri Argos (Edu Manzano) a powerful and influential character, and meet Brigitta (Bing Loyzaga), an associate of Henri who secretly has feelings for him. Lorrea turns into Lorrinda, known to the people of the underworld as "Red Butterfly" or "Red". She is also plunged into meeting a long lost love Boris Archangel (John Estrada) the man that Lorrea and Lorrinda once loved, who works for Henri as his right-hand man.

Her son Andrei grows up as Yuri Orbida (John Lloyd Cruz) the son adopted by Mirdo Orbida (Ronnie Lazaro) whom he grows to love as a real father. Yuri is accepted at a new school in Manila and meets Helaena Argos (Rica Peralejo) at the university; the two meet and form a bond. Helaena falls for Yuri, to the dismay of Kayla (Dimples Romana) Yuri's childhood friend and even crush. Meanwhile, Yuri and his childhood friend Ivan (Jhong Hilario) reunite. Ivan's adoptive mother dies in suicide and Ivan retaliates by revealing to Lorrea that her son Andrei died.

Henri Argo's criminal empire is ruined, Yuri vows revenge upon "Red" for killing his adoptive father, Kayla is attacked, and the truth is finally revealed about Henri being the drug lord, syndicate, leaving the family penniless. Helaena is heartbroken after overhearing Yuri's true feelings for her and his true love for Kayla. Helaena, a longtime love of Anilov Mijares (Bernard Palanca), eventually tries to support her family and becomes a prostitute.

Lady Morgana (Jean Garcia), Brigitta's evil sister and now Boris' wife, enters the picture and plans to make "Red's" family all suffer. Helaena is connected to Anilov and has sessions with him as Mister X, an Alter Ego. Unknown to Yuri is that Dimitri (Johnny Delgado), who was once his professor and taught him law, is the one who is also connected to his plans for revenge. He grows to hate Anilov for not stopping his older sister who eventually dies overdosing on a drug made by Henri's family.

After 8 years, Lorrea is still alive and Lady Morgana's old enemies resurface. Yuri falls for Katrina (Bea Alonzo) Henri's younger daughter who has just finished becoming a lawyer the two eventually fall in love. Kayla is successful as well but suffers from jealousy. Dimitri adopts Yuri and takes him under his wing. On the other hand, Lady Morgana becomes insane and eventually tries to shoot Lorrea, but shoots Boris instead. Yuri is unwilling to forgive Lorrea because there is not enough proof to make him believe she is the real Lorrea and not Lorrinda. Lorrea's face is fixed after surgery after the bomb explosion that is planted by Lady Morgana. The real Lorrinda/"Red Butterfly" is alive having suffered from a head trauma and amnesia after the bombing in the jail. Lorrinda then defends her twin and says that the series of events that took place will truly reveal that everything was staged and that everything was her fault. Yuri then accepts the truth. Helaena and Anilov marry and have a child, while Lorrea takes care of Alyssa, the child of Lady Morgana and Boris. Lady Morgana takes full responsibility for all the attempts and killings, and later on commits suicide in jail due to the guilt for Boris' death. Yuri becomes a law lecturer in a university and accepts Lorrea and Francis as his parents and all is forgiven.

== Cast ==
Main cast

- Lorna Tolentino portrays two roles:
  - Lorrea Guinto / Lea Mijares - (the female protagonist) is the good twin trying to find her lost son Andre.
  - Lorrinda Guinto / Ingrid Medrano / Red Butterfly - (the female antagonist) has always wanted more than life had to offer for her so she became a part of the drug syndicate and adopted the names Ingrid Medrano and Red Butterfly. They both fall in love with Boris.

Supporting cast

- John Lloyd Cruz as Yuri Orbida / Andre Guinto – The lost son of Lorrea. He grows up to be a lawyer and seeks justice for the deaths of his foster fathers. Carl John Barrameda portrays a young Yuri.
- Rica Peralejo as Helaena Argos – The eldest child of Henri Argos. She does everything in her power to raise her brother and sister after her father dies. She gets seriously hurt from her first love which is Yuri but will learn to love again with Anilov.
- John Estrada as Boris Arcangel – He becomes the man that both Lorrea and Lorrinda love. He becomes the right-hand man of Henri Argos.
- Edu Manzano as Henry Argos – Father of Helaena, Katrina, and Niko. One of the leaders of the drug syndicate.
- Jean Garcia as Lady Morgana Frost-Arcangel – The female antagonist of series. She will make Lorrea, Yuri, and the Argos children's lives miserable as hell.
- Ronnie Lazaro as Mirdo Orbida – The first foster father of Yuri who raised and taught him right from wrong up to his adolescent years.
- Johnny Delgado† as Dimitri Mijares – The father of Anilov and the second foster father of Yuri who educate him to a law school after Mirdo died.
- Bea Alonzo as Katrina Argos – The middle child of Henry Argos. She grows up to be a lawyer and falls for her sister's first love.
- Bernard Palanca as Anilov Mijares – Son of Dimitri but they do not get along. He does the exact opposite of what his father wants even when it comes to his personal life.
- Dimples Romana as Kayla "Pards" Reneza – She is the childhood friend of Yuri and loves him from a far.
- Bing Loyzaga as Brigitta – She pretends to be a caring friend to Henri but underneath of it is the will to do anything to be his one true love. The older sister of Morgana. Miss Bing Loyzaga delivers a powerful and unforgettable performances that deserves multiple international acting awards.
- Ricky Davao as Francis Ventaspejo – A struggling priest who tries to make up for all the mistakes he has done to Lorrea in the past. The biological father of Yuri.
- Shaina Magdayao as Guinevere "Gwenn" Martinez – The foster child of Lorrea.
- Alwyn Uytingco as Nikolai "Nikos" Argos – The youngest Argos child and the closest to Lorrea.
- Jhong Hilario as Ivan – Childhood friend to Yuri.

Recurring cast

- Rafael Rosell as Tiborce – He is the man who Kayla married despite her love to Yuri.
- Andre Tiangco as Father Lorenz – He stood as Francis' spiritual voice of reason while Lorrea was recuperating from the blast that destroyed her face.
- Ariel Reonal and Don Rivera as the two young NBI agents – Assisted Boris in tracking down a list of people suspected to be connected to Dimitri's death.
- Jennylyn Mercado as Aira
- Kathleen Hermosa as Erika
- Eunice Lagusad as Alyssa

Guest cast

- Snooky Serna as Maida Ventaspejo
- Romeo Rivera as Don Feudor Ventaspejo
- Gloria Sevilla as Doña Tilda Ventaspejo
