= List of awards and nomination received by Angelica Panganiban =

Filipino actor (born 1986)

Angelica Panganiban awards and nominations
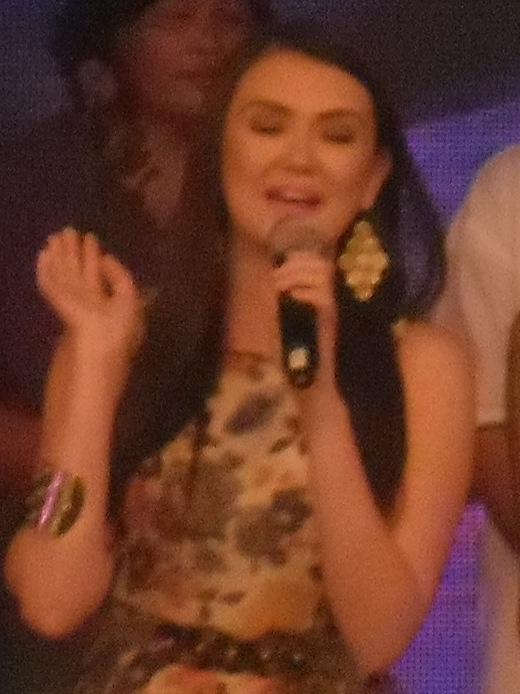
- Panganiban in 2012
Awards and nominations
Award	Wins	Nominations

Totals (Note: Certain award groups do not simply award one winner. They acknowledge several different recipients, have runners-up, and have third place. Since this is a specific recognition and is different from losing an award, runner-up mentions are considered wins in this award tally. For simplification and to avoid errors, each award in this list has been presumed to have had a prior nomination.)
- Wins: 30
- Nominations: 39

Angelica Panganiban is a Filipino-American actress who has received several awards and nominations throughout her entertainment career. She is known for her acting versatility in various movie genres and was dubbed as the new "Queen of Drama" by the media. Her accolades include three FAMAS Award, four Box Office Entertainment Awards, three Golden Screen Television Awards, two PMPC Star Awards for Movies, two KBP Golden Dove Awards, a Luna Award, a Golden Screen Movie Award, an EdukCircle Award, a Gawad Tanglaw Award including nominations from Guam International Film Festival, a Gawad Urian Award, Gawad Genio Award and The EDDYS Award nomination.

Panganiban was a child actress and started acting at the age of 6. She appeared in third season of the youth oriented show Ang TV (1995-1996) and the TV show Love Notes. Her breakthrough came with her critically acclaimed performance in the melodrama film Separada (1994), for which she won the FAMAS Award and PMPC Star Awards for Movies for Best Child Actress. After two years, she returned to family drama, playing the role of Issa, an adopted child in Ama, Ina, Anak (1996) and won a Best Child Actress Award at the PMPC Star Awards for Movies and a nomination from FAMAS Award.

She was able to transition into adult roles successfully and appeared in the drama movie Santa Santita (2004) with a biblical theme of Magdalene. For performance, she garnered Best Actress nominations from FAMAS Award, Luna Award and Golden Screen Movie Awards. She was in the romantic drama movie A Love Story (2007), playing Karyn, a flight attendant and won Best Supporting Actress award at the 26th Luna Awards and received nominations from Gawad Genio Award and Golden Screen Movie Awards. In 2010, she co-starred in the comedy movie Here Comes the Bride (2010) and won Best Actress in a comedy role at the 8th Golden Screen Movie Awards and received a special award for Comedy Actress of the Year at the 42nd GMMSF Box Office Entertainment Awards.

Panganiban continued to gain acclaimed in the horror movie Segunda Mano (2011), playing the role of Marie and won FAMAS Award for Best Supporting Actress with a nomination from PMPC Star Awards for Movies. The next year, she appeared in the romantic drama movie One More Try (2012) and was awarded with Film Actress of the Year at the 44th GMMSF Box Office Entertainment Awards and received various nominations from Metro Manila Film Festival, FAMAS Award, Golden Screen Movie Awards and PMPC Star Awards for Movies.

She appeared in romantic comedy movies Every Breath U Take (2014) and received Luna Award Best Actress nomination and in That Thing Called Tadhana (2014) and won Gawad Tanglaw Best Actress award and received nominations from Guam International Film Festival, Gawad Urian Award, Luna Award and Gawad PASADO Awards. In 2016, she starred in romantic film The Unmarried Wife (2016) and won FAMAS Award for Best Actress and named as the Most Influential Film Actress of the Year by EdukCircle Awards with a nomination from Gawad Pasado.

On television, she was part of the comedy sketch show Banana Sundae (2008-2020) and received several awards for Best Comedy Actress including three Golden Screen TV Awards, two KBP Golden Dove Awards, two Box Office Entertainment Awards and one PMPC Star Awards for Television.

== Awards and nominations ==
=== Film ===
Year	Category	Movie	Organization	Result
2017	Movie Supporting Actress of the Year	Whistleblower	33rd PMPC Star Awards for Movies	Nominated
2017	Best Actress	The Unmarried Wife	65th FAMAS Awards	Won
2017	Most Influential Film Actress of the Year	The Unmarried Wife	7th EdukCircle Awards	Won
2017	Best Actress	The Unmarried Wife	19th Gawad Pasado Awards	Nominated
2017	Best Actress Of The Year	The Unmarried Wife	Gawad Bedista Award	Won
2016	Best Actress	That Thing Called Tadhana	34th Luna Awards	Nominated
2015	Achievement in Acting	That Thing Called Tadhana	Guam International Film Festival	Nominated
2015	Best Actress	That Thing Called Tadhana	38th Gawad Urian Awards	Nominated
2015	Best Actress	That Thing Called Tadhana	17th Gawad Pasado Awards	Nominated
2015	Best Actress	That Thing Called Tadhana	13th Gawad Tanglaw	Won
2014	Best Actress	That Thing Called Tadhana	2014 Cinema One Originals Film Festival	Won
2013	Best Actress	Ang Alamat ni China Doll	2013 Cinema One Originals Film Festival	Won
2013	Best Actress	Every Breath U Take	31st Luna Awards	Nominated
2013	Best Performance by an Actress in a Lead Role (Drama)	One More Try	10th ENPRESS Golden Screen Awards for Movies	Nominated
2013	Best Actress	One More Try	61st FAMAS Awards	Nominated
2013	Film Actress of the Year	One More Try	44th Guillermo Mendoza Memorial Scholarship Foundation Awards	Won
2013	Best Actress	One More Try	29th PMPC Star Awards for Movies	Nominated
2012	Best Actress	One More Try	38th Metro Manila Film Festival	Nominated
2012	Best Supporting Actress	Segunda Mano	60th FAMAS Awards	Won
2012	Movie Supporting Actress of the Year	Segunda Mano	PMPC Star Awards for Movies	Nominated
2011	Comedy Actress of the Year	Here Comes The Bride	42nd Guillermo Mendoza Memorial Scholarship Foundation Awards	Won
2011	Best Performance by an Actress in a Lead Role (Musical or Comedy)	Here Comes The Bride	8th ENPRESS Golden Screen Awards for Movies	Won
2011	Best Film Actress	Here Comes The Bride	Gawad Genio Awards	Nominated
2010	Best Actress	I Love You, Goodbye	58th FAMAS Awards	Nominated
2010	Best Actress	I Love You, Goodbye	12th Gawad Pasado Awards	Nominated
2010	Movie Actress of the Year	I Love You, Goodbye	26th PMPC Star Awards for Movies	Nominated
2009	Best Actress	I Love You, Goodbye	35th Metro Manila Film Festival	Nominated
2009	Best Supporting Actress	A Love Story	26th Luna Awards	Won
2008	Best Supporting Actress	A Love Story	ENPRESS Golden Screen Awards	Nominated
2008	Best Film Supporting Actress	A Love Story	Gawad Genio	Nominated
2005	Best Actress	Santa Santita	FAMAS Awards	Nominated
2005	Best Actress	Santa Santita	ENPRESS Golden Screen Awards	Nominated
1998	Best Child Actress	Hanggang Kailan Kita Mamahalin	FAMAS Awards	Nominated
1997	Best Child Actress	Ama, Ina, Anak	FAMAS Awards	Nominated
1997	Best Child Actress	Ama, Ina, Anak	PMPC Star Awards for Movies	Won
1996	Best Child Actress	Sarah... Ang Munting Prinsesa	FAMAS Awards	Nominated
1996	Best Child Actress	Sarah... Ang Munting Prinsesa	PMPC Star Awards for Movies	Nominated
1995	Best Child Actress	Separada	FAMAS Awards	Won
1995	Best Child Actress	Separada	PMPC Star Awards for Movies	Won

=== Television ===
Year	Category	Show	Organization	Result
2019	Best Actress for Comedy	Banana Sundae	27th KBP Golden Dove Awards	Won
2019	Best Comedy Actress	Banana Sundae	33rd PMPC Star Awards for Television	Nominated
2018	Best Comedy Actress	Banana Sundae	32nd PMPC Star Awards for Television	Nominated
2018	Most Innovative TV Commedianne	Banana Sundae	3rd Illumine Innovation Awards for Television	Won
2018	Comedy Actress of the Year	Banana Sundae	49th Box Office Entertainment Awards	Won
2017	Best Comedy Actress	Banana Sundae	31st PMPC Star Awards for Television	Nominated
2017	Best Comedy Actress for Television	Banana Sundae	Alta Media Icon Awards	Won
2017	Best TV Actress for a Comedy Program	Banana Sundae	25th KBP Golden Dove Awards	Won
2017	Comedy Actress of the Year	Banana Sundae	48th Box Office Entertainment Awards	Won
2016	Best Comedy Actress	Banana Sundae	30th PMPC Star Awards for Television	Nominated
2016	Comedy Actress of the Year	Banana Sundae	Philippine Entertainment Portal List Awards 2016	Won
2015	Best Drama Actress	Pangako Sa 'Yo	29th PMPC Star Awards for Television	Nominated
2015	Best Comedy Actress	Banana Split	29th PMPC Star Awards for Television	Nominated
2015	Outstanding Performance by an Actress (Gag or Comedy Program)	Banana Split	6th ENPRESS Golden Screen TV Awards	Won
2014	Outstanding Performance by an Actress (Gag or Comedy Program)	Banana Split	5th ENPRESS Golden Screen TV Awards	Nominated
2014	Best Comedy Actress	Banana Split	28th PMPC Star Awards for Television	Nominated
2013	Best Comedy Actress	Banana Split	27th PMPC Star Awards for Television	Nominated
2013	Outstanding Performance by an Actress (Gag or Comedy Program)	Banana Split	4th ENPRESS Golden Screen TV Awards	Won
2012	Best Comedy Actress	Banana Split	26th PMPC Star Awards for Television	Nominated
2011	Outstanding Performance by an Actress (Gag or Comedy Program)	Banana Split	3rd ENPRESS Golden Screen TV Awards	Won
2011	Best Actress in a Daily Soap Opera	Rubi	7th USTv Students' Choice Awards	Won
2011	Best Comedy Actress	Banana Split	25th PMPC Star Awards for Television	Nominated
2010	Best Drama Actress	Rubi	24th PMPC Star Awards for Television	Nominated
2010	Best Comedy Actress	Banana Split	24th PMPC Star Awards for Television	Won
2009	Best Drama Actress	Iisa Pa Lamang	23rd PMPC Star Awards for Television	Nominated
2009	Best Comedy Actress	Banana Split	23rd PMPC Star Awards for Television	Nominated
2008	Villain of the Year	Iisa Pa Lamang	1st Supreme to the Extreme Awards (Philippine Star)	Won

== Special awards and recognitions ==
=== Box office ===
Year	Organization	Award
2015	Guillermo Mendoza Memorial Scholarship Foundation	Bert Marcelo Lifetime Achievement Award
2009	Guillermo Mendoza Memorial Scholarship Foundation	Promising Female Box Office Star for Movies & TV
2006	ASAP Pop Viewers' Choice Awards	Pop Cover Girl
1997	Guillermo Mendoza Memorial Scholarship Foundation	Most Popular Child Star

=== Rankings ===
Year	Organization	Category	Rank
2017	FHM Philippines	Philippines 100 Sexiest Women	Rank #50
2016	FHM Philippines	Philippines 100 Sexiest Women	Rank #44
2015	FHM Philippines	Philippines 100 Sexiest Women	Rank #33
2014	FHM Philippines	Philippines 100 Sexiest Women	Rank #30
2013	FHM Philippines	Philippines 100 Sexiest Women	Rank #12
2012	FHM Philippines	Philippines 100 Sexiest Women	Rank #20
2011	FHM Philippines	Philippines 100 Sexiest Women	Rank #13
2010	FHM Philippines	Philippines 100 Sexiest Women	Rank #6
2009	FHM Philippines	Philippines 100 Sexiest Women	Rank #9
2008	FHM Philippines	Philippines 100 Sexiest Women	Rank #10
2008	Maxim Hot 100	Hottest 100 Women	Rank #6
2007	Maxim Hot 100	Hottest 100 Women	Rank #1
2007	FHM Philippines	Philippines 100 Sexiest Women	Rank #4
2006	FHM Philippines	Philippines 100 Sexiest Women	Rank #14
2005	FHM Philippines	Philippines 100 Sexiest Women	Rank #9
