= Ketchup Eusebio =

Filipino actor (born 1985)

- Born: Michael Allen Eusebio; September 9, 1985 (age 41); Philippines
- Years active: 2002–present
- Partner: Mary Ann Laggui
- Children: 3

Michael Allen Eusebio (born September 9, 1985), better known by his stage name Ketchup Eusebio, is a Filipino actor.

== Filmography ==
=== Film ===
Year	Title	Role	Notes	Source
2003	Mr. Suave	Mr. Roboto		
2005	ULOL	Jojo		
2006	Kapag Tumibok Ang Puso: Not Once, But Twice	Brad		
2006	White Lady	Hector		
2006	First Day High	Mascot		
2006	Ang Pamana: The Inheritance	Nico		
2006	Gigil	Nato		
2006	Sa Aking Pagkagising Mula sa Kamulatan	Pogi		
2006	Mano Po 5: Gua Ai Di	Emerson		
2007	Angels	Cacho		
2007	I've Fallen for You	Pipo		
2007	Sakal, Sakali, Saklolo	Dodi		
2009	OMG (Oh, My Girl!)	Assistant Director		
2009	Lola	Mateo	Best Film (Muhr AsiaAfrica Feature) – 6th Dubai International Film Festival	
2009	I Love You, Goodbye	Jimbo		
2010	Cinco	Eric	"Mukha" segment	
2010	Miss You Like Crazy	Kato		
2010	Noy	Harold		
2010	My Amnesia Girl	Chibu		
2010	RPG Metanoia	Andrew / Bossing	Voice only	
2011	Catch Me, I'm In Love	Jojo		
2011	Manila Kingpin: The Asiong Salonga Story	Kiko		
2011	Rakenrol	Mo		
2012	Every Breath U Take	Chickoy		
2014	Sa Ngalan Ng Ama, Ina At Anak	NPA Rebel		
2015	Heneral Luna	Capt. Pedro Janolino		
2016	Just the 3 of Us	Tyson		
2016	Ang Bagong Pamilya ni Ponching	Elmerson		
2017	Loving in Tandem	Elong		
2017	Seven Sundays	Jun		
2018	The Hows of Us	Buyer		
2018	'Tol	Arthur		
2019	Mindanao	Vergara		
2020	Boyette: Not a Girl Yet	Jojo		
2021	Love or Money	Juniver		
2023	GomBurZa	Francisco Zaldua		
2024	Uninvited	Jomar Maitim		

=== Television ===
Year	Title	Role	Notes	Source
2002	Berks	Ketchup		
2003	Darating ang Umaga	Presto		
2003	Maalaala Mo Kaya		Episode: "Imahe Ng Birhen"	
2003	Maalaala Mo Kaya		Episode: "Crossword Puzzle"	
2003–05	Ang Tanging Ina	Pip		
2004	Maalaala Mo Kaya		Episode: "Sto. Niño de Cebu"	
2005	Maalaala Mo Kaya		Episode: "Marmol"	
2005	Basta Sports	Himself / Host		
2005	Maalaala Mo Kaya		Episode: "Painting"	
2005–06	Mga Anghel Na Walang Langit	Ted		
2006	Maalaala Mo Kaya		Episode: "Scapular"	
2006	It's A Guy Thing	Himself / Host		
2007	Komiks: Pedro Penduko at ang mga Engkantao			
2007	Maalaala Mo Kaya		Episode: "Yellow Sofa"	
2007–08	Prinsesa ng Banyera	Bukol		
2008	Maalaala Mo Kaya	Mio	Episode: "Lupa"	
2009	Midnight DJ		Episode: "Tiyanak Sa Iskwater"	
2009	Precious Hearts Romances Presents: Ang Lalaking Nagmahal Sa Akin	Jericho Magpantay		
2009	Maalaala Mo Kaya	Ray	Episode: "Tsinelas"	
2009	May Bukas Pa	Buboy		
2010	Kung Tayo'y Magkakalayo	NGO Worker		
2010	Claudine			
2010	Elena M. Patron's Momay	Mac		
2010	Maalaala Mo Kaya	Jover	Episode: "Toy Car	
2010	Real Stories Mula Sa Face To Face			
2010	Maalaala Mo Kaya		Episode: "Plane Ticket"	
2011	Guns and Roses	McArthur "Mac-mac" Pangan		
2011	Maalaala Mo Kaya	Erwin	Episode: "Wig"	
2011	Wansapanataym	Edong	Episode: "Unli-Gift Box"	
2012	Princess and I	Han		
2013	Maalaala Mo Kaya	Andres	Episode: "Bahay"	
2013	Carlo J. Caparas' Dugong Buhay	Christopher "Tope" Bukid		
2014	Home Sweetie Home	Chris Suarez		
2014	Be Careful With My Heart	Tim Gonzaga		
2014	Wansapanataym	Domeng	Episode: "My Guardian Angel"	
2014	Ipaglaban Mo!	Badong	Episode: "Ibigay Ang Aming Karapatan"	
2014	Dream Dad	Michael Lucas Castro		
2015	Ningning	Adonis "Dondon" Angeles		
2017	FPJ's Ang Probinsyano	Drug Fish Syndicate Dealer		
2017	Maalaala Mo Kaya	George Belarmino	Episode: "Tricycle"	
2018	La Luna Sangre	Lucho Herrero		
2019	Sino ang May Sala?	Ambrosio "Bogs" Bitangcol and Armand Bitangcol	Lead dual role	
2019	Maalaala Mo Kaya	Frino	Episode: "Langoy Ng Buhay"	
2020	A Soldier's Heart	Cpl. Olan Arguelles		
2020	Fill in the Bank	Himself / Contestant		
2021	Maalaala Mo Kaya	Jose Delos Santos	Episode: "Sobre"	
2022	The Broken Marriage Vow	Charlie Manansala		
2022	Mars Ravelo's Darna			
2022	Suntok sa Buwan	Tonio		
2023	Cattleya Killer	Rigor Salas		
2023	Can't Buy Me Love	Ramoncito "Monching" Rivera	Recurring role	
2024	Pamilya Sagrado	Mattias Turiano	Supporting cast/ Protagonist	
2025	Lolong	Badong	Recurring cast	
2026	The Master Cutter	Emerson	Supporting cast	

== Accolades ==
Year	Work	Award	Category	Result	Source
2003	Maalaala Mo Kaya: "Imahe ng Birhen"	PMPC Star Awards for Television	Best New Male TV Personality	Nominated	
2006	Sa Aking Pagkakagising Mula sa Kamulatan	Gawad Urian	Best Supporting Actor	Won	
2006	Sa Aking Pagkakagising Mula sa Kamulatan	Golden Screen Awards	Best Supporting Actor (Drama, Musical or Comedy)	Nominated	
2013	Kabisera	C1 Originals Award	Best Supporting Actor - Cinema One Plus	Nominated	
2016	Heneral Luna	FAMAS Awards	Best Supporting Actor	Nominated	
2018	Mamang	Cinemalaya	Best Supporting Actor	Won	
2019	Mamang	Gawad Urian	Best Actor	Nominated	
2020	Mindanao	FAP Luna Awards	Best Supporting Actor	Nominated	
2020	Mindanao	14th Gawad Genio Awards	Best Supporting Actor	Nominated	
