= Angelica Panganiban =

Filipino actress (born 1986)

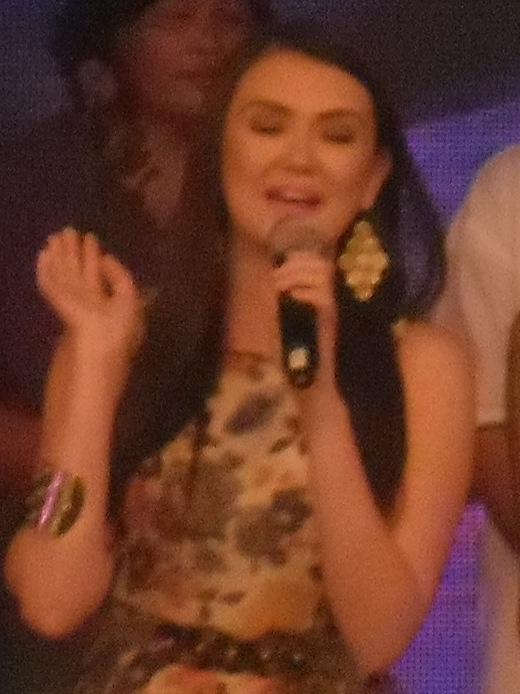
- Panganiban on the set of It's Showtime in 2012
- Born: Angelica Jane David Charlson; November 4, 1986 (age 40); Payatas, Quezon City, Philippines
- Occupations: Actress; model; comedian; host; vlogger
- Years active: 1992–present
- Agent: Star Magic (1992–present)
- Spouse: Gregg Homan (m. 2023)
- Children: 1
- Awards: Full list

Angelica Panganiban (Tagalog pronunciation: [pɐ.ŋɐˈniː.bɐn]; born Angelica Jane David Charlson on November 4, 1986) is a Filipino actress, model and comedian.

Regarded as the "Queen of Drama" by various media outlets, she is recognized as one of the most seasoned and versatile actresses in the Philippines. Panganiban has won three FAMAS Awards, two Cinema One Originals Digital Film Awards, and the title of "Best Comedy Actress" for nine years in a row at the PMPC Star Awards and Golden Screen TV Awards.

Panganiban started her career at the age of 6 when she appeared on the television show, Love Note (1992). Her first regular show was the youth-oriented variety show, Ang TV (1995–1997), on ABS-CBN. She made her film debut in Carlo J. Caparas; Antipolo Massacre (1993). She also starred in films like Separada (1994), Sarah... Ang Munting Prinsesa (1995), and Ama, Ina, Anak (1996), earning Best Child Actress awards and nominations at the FAMAS Awards and PMPC Star Awards for Movies. She played teeny-bopper roles in G-mik (1999–2002) and Berks (2002–2004).

In the early 2000s, Panganiban transitioned to more mature roles, starting with the film Santa Santita (2004), where she gained Best Actress nominations in the FAMAS and Luna Awards, among others. She is known for her dramatic performances in the film A Love Story (2007) and the television series Iisa Pa Lamang (2008) and Rubi (2010), wherein she received Best Actress and Best Supporting Actress awards and nominations at the Luna Awards and PMPC Star Awards for Television. Panganiban also starred in horror films like White Lady (2006), Bulong (2011), and Segunda Mano (2011), the last of which earned her the FAMAS Award for Best Supporting Actress. She also received various accolades for her role in the comedy film Here Comes The Bride (2011). Panganiban has also won several Best Comedy Actress awards and nominations at the Golden Screen TV Awards and PMPC Star Awards for appearing in the gag show Banana Split (2008–2020).

Panganiban's role in the film That Thing Called Tadhana (2014) earned her commercial and critical success, winning Best Actress at the Cinema One Originals and the Gawad Tanglaw awards.

== Early life ==
Angelica Jane David Charlson was born in Payatas, Quezon City on November 4, 1986. Her biological mother was a Filipina who died in 2008 and was buried in Singapore, while her biological father, Mark David Charlson, is an American with Norwegian, Swedish, Dutch, English, Irish, Scottish, Scots-Irish/Northern Irish ancestry from Iowa and a former member of the US Navy. She acquired the surname Panganiban from her adoptive family.

Panganiban finished elementary school in 1999 at St. Vincent School in Teacher's Village, Quezon City, and high school in 2003 at the same school's Main campus along West Avenue. She was the Junior-Senior Prom Princess in 2002 and Miss Junior and Senior Prom in 2003. She was also a cheerleader and a Feature Editor in their school newspaper. She attended college at Thames International Business School, majoring in mass communication.

== Career ==
=== 1992–2003: Early work ===
As a child star, Panganiban received Best Child Actress awards and nominations because of her outstanding performances in movies. Her notable appearances include Jenny in the 1993 Maricel Soriano drama movie, Separada where she won two Best Child Actress awards in the FAMAS and PMPC Star Awards; and Becky in the 1995 family-drama film, Sarah... Ang Munting Prinsesa with her friend, Camille Prats in the title role where she received Best Child Actress nominations. She also appeared in a daily drama series, Familia Zaragoza.

As a teen star, Panganiban starred in the youth-oriented show, G-mik in 1999 and she was paired with Carlo Aquino. In 2001, Panganiban played the role of Abby De Guzman in the drama series, Sa Puso Ko Iingatan Ka which was top-billed by Judy Ann Santos. In 2002, she portrayed the role, Nicole in another youth-oriented show entitled, Berks along with her love team partner, Carlo Aquino.

Her team up with Carlo Aquino continued. She appeared as the girlfriend of Aquino's character in the hit comedy film, Ang Tanging Ina top-billed by Ai-Ai de las Alas in 2003. Up until the third installment of Regal Entertainment's Mano Po, the movie Mano Po III: My Love in 2004, wherein she played as the young Vilma Santos and Aquino as the young Christopher de Leon.

=== 2004–2012: Breakthrough ===
In November 2004, at the age of 18, after portraying several supporting roles, she landed the lead and the title role in the movie, Santa Santita opposite Jericho Rosales. The director of the film, Laurice Guillen and the producer, Tony Gloria of Unitel Pictures requested Johnny Manahan of ABS-CBN Talent Center to audition his talents for the role. "We auditioned 30 of them," Guillen said. "Some of them had played supporting roles in films already. But we couldn't find what we were looking for among them. Then one day, Angelica Panganiban came to audition. And we found in her the actress we wanted." Her performance in that film earned her three Best Actress nominations in the FAMAS, FAP Luna, and ENPRESS Golden Screen Awards. Eventually in the same year, she played a lead role in the soap opera, Mangarap Ka with Piolo Pascual. In 2005, she starred in drama series, Vietnam Rose with Maricel Soriano.

During 2006, she appeared regularly in Your Song, Komiks, and Love Spell; she also topbilled the horror suspense film, White Lady. In 2007, she starred in a fantasy series, Rounin and played the role of Aura. In the same year, Panganiban appeared in the film, A Love Story with Aga Muhlach and Maricel Soriano from which she earned her first Best Supporting Actress trophy in the FAP Luna Awards. She also appeared in Judy Ann Santos' romantic soap opera, Ysabella as a guest character, and in December 2007, she played Lena in Maging Sino Ka Man: Ang Pagbabalik with Derek Ramsay, Toni Gonzaga, and the original cast: John Lloyd Cruz, Bea Alonzo, Sam Milby, and Anne Curtis. She became a full-fledged adult dramatic actress in the 2008 primetime drama series, Iisa Pa Lamang with Claudine Barretto. That series made her the Villain of the Year in the 1st Supreme to the Extreme Awards (Philippine Star), and she earned Best Drama Actress nomination in the 23rd PMPC Star Awards for Television.

In October 2008, Panganiban pioneered a comedy gag show, Banana Split on ABS-CBN. The show also featured Valerie Concepcion, Roxanne Guinoo, Dianne Medina, and Cristine Reyes. She is/has the only actress who remained from the original cast when the show started its second season in 2009 until its last airing in 2020.

In February 2009, Panganiban appeared in an episode of Your Song with Derek Ramsay, and in mid-2009 she filmed her television series, Rubi which was based on the 2004 Mexican telenovela Rubí and the pilot episode aired in February 2010 originally by Mexican actress Barbara Mori. She was joined by Diether Ocampo, Shaina Magdayao, and Jake Cuenca. Charlson received Best Actress in a Daily Soap Opera award in the 7th USTv Students' Choice Awards through that series. Later that year, she also starred in the drama/romance movie, I Love You, Goodbye with her then-boyfriend Derek Ramsay. This was rated the Second Best Picture in the 2009 Metro Manila Film Festival and made her a box-office favorite after it won awards for Best Picture, Best Screenplay, Best Story and Best Director. Charlson was nominated for Best Festival Actress. In the same year, she also received Best Comedy Actress nomination in the PMPC Star Awards for Television through Banana Split.

The following year, Panganiban starred in Here Comes The Bride, a 2010 comedy film with Eugene Domingo, Tuesday Vargas, Jaime Fabregas, Tom Rodriguez, and John Lapus. The movie gained positive reviews from viewers and critics and enjoyed box office success. Charlson won the Best Performance by an Actress in a Leading Role (Musical or Comedy) award in the 8th ENPRESS Golden Screen Awards for Movies. Because of this film, Charlson was hailed as the Comedy Actress of the Year in the 42nd Guillermo Mendoza Memorial Scholarship Foundation. She also won as the Best Comedy Actress through Banana Split in the 24th PMPC Star Awards for Television.

Panganiban topbilled a horror-comedy film, Bulong together with Vhong Navarro in February 2011. It was Star Cinema's opening salvo for that year and was directed by Chito Rono. She also consistently demonstrated her comedic antics onscreen through Banana Split as she earned another Best Comedy Actress nomination in the 25th PMPC Star Awards for Television, and won the Outstanding Performance by an Actress in a Gag or Comedy Program award in the ENPRESS Golden Screen Awards.

Panganiban proved her versatility when she received her second Best Supporting Actress award through the horror suspense film, Segunda Mano in the 60th FAMAS Awards. The movie also starred Kris Aquino and Dingdong Dantes. It was an official entry in the 2011 Metro Manila Film Festival of Star Cinema with the AgostoDos Pictures, and MJM Productions.

In 2012, Panganiban starred in four different films: Every Breath U Take, a romantic comedy film opposite fellow Star Magic artist, Piolo Pascual; Madaling Araw Mahabang Gabi, an Indie film that was written and directed by friend, Dante Nico Garcia; 24/7 in Love, a romantic comedy film that starred an ensemble cast of selected Star Magic talents in celebration of its 20th anniversary; and the romantic drama film, One More Try which was an official entry in the 2012 Metro Manila Film Festival by Star Cinema, with Dingdong Dantes, Zanjoe Marudo, and Angel Locsin.

=== 2013–2022: Established actress ===
In 2013, Panganiban returned to the Philippine Primetime with the television series Apoy sa Dagat alongside Piolo Pascual and Diether Ocampo. It was her first dual role and the first in Philippine television history where an actress top-billed the lead star twice. She also starred in an independent film, Alamat ni China Doll, through Cinema One Originals and bagged the festival's Best Actress award.

In 2014, Panganiban starred in the Antoinette Jadaone comedy film Beauty in a Bottle with Angeline Quinto and Assunta de Rossi. She then starred again in a Cinema One Originals entry through Jadaone’s romantic comedy That Thing Called Tadhana opposite JM De Guzman. She won the festival’s Best Actress award for the second consecutive time. The film achieved box-office success with its February 2015 commercial release, and its quotable lines earned Panganiban the title “Hugot Queen.” She also received an Achievement in Acting nomination in the Guam International Film Festival for her performance.

In 2015, Panganiban played the iconic character of Madam Claudia Buenavista, originally portrayed by Jean Garcia, in the remake of Pangako Sa ’Yo. In the same year, Banana Split was renamed into Banana Sundae and was put on a new timeslot, as Banana Nite ended its two-year run. She garnered nominations for Best Drama Actress and Best Comedy Actress at the 29th PMPC Star Awards for Television for her works in the two television series.

In 2016, Panganiban appeared in FPJ’s Ang Probinsyano through a minor antagonistic role as Marta. She reunited with Dantes through the romantic drama film The Unmarried Wife. A commercial success, she won the FAMAS Award for Best Actress for her role as Anne Victorio.

In 2018, Panganiban starred in Ang Dalawang Mrs. Reyes, a comedy film opposite Judy Ann Santos; and Exes Baggage, a romantic drama film opposite Carlo Aquino. Both films achieved commercial success, while the latter earned her a nomination for FAMAS Award for Best Actress. She also starred in the family drama series Playhouse opposite Zanjoe Marudo.

In 2019, Panganiban starred in the iWant original series Call Me Tita, then achieved another box-office success with the drama film Unbreakable alongside Bea Alonzo and Richard Gutierrez.

In 2020, Panganiban starred in the Kapamilya Channel's series Walang Hanggang Paalam. She then appeared in the IWant original film Love Lockdown and voiced the titular character in the Netflix adult animated film Hayop Ka! The Nimfa Dimaano Story.

In 2021, Panganiban starred in the romantic comedy film Love or Money with Coco Martin. She then appeared in the IWant original drama series The Goodbye Girl and reunited with Jadaone in the WeTV sex comedy series The Kangks Show, both in 2022.

=== 2025–present: Stage debut and return to film and television ===
In June 2025, Panganiban made her theater debut in Dont Meow for Me, Catriona, directed by Tony Go Yadao. She also returned to the Metro Manila Film Festival and reunited with Marudo through the romantic drama film Unmarry. The two are also set to star in the 2026 crime drama series The Silent Noise.

== Advocacies and issues ==
Panganiban has been outspoken on numerous political issues in the Philippines, including the government's response to the COVID-19 pandemic in the Philippines, and the ABS-CBN franchise renewal controversy.

== Personal life ==
In a tell-all interview with The Buzz, Panganiban disclosed that her biological mother died in 2008 and was interred in Singapore. She added that she did everything to find her biological father, Mark Charlson, who she said did not try to find her because he thought that she and her mother had died in a car accident. In November 2010, she was reunited with Charlson in Los Angeles, California after 24 years apart, when ABS-CBN gave her a week-long break from work.

On September 20, 2022, Panganiban gave birth to her daughter, Amila Sabine Homan by an emergency caesarean section.

On December 31, 2023, she married Gregg Homan in a small rooftop wedding in Los Angeles, which was witnessed by chosen family members and close friends including Kim Chiu, Bela Padilla and their daughter Amila Sabine.

On April 15, 2024, the couple were bestowed a bridal shower by Dr. Aivee Teo and Dr. Z’Shen of The Aivee Clinic at The A Institute in Bonifacio Global City witnessed by mother, Annabelle Panganiban and sister Arlene Aquino, with daughters Abby and Alyanna. On April 20, 2024, in the second wedding ceremony in Siargao, Glaiza de Castro was chosen a bridesmaid, while Amila Sabine "Baby Bean" was the flower girl.

In July 2024, Panganiban underwent 7 hours hip core decompression surgery at St. Luke's Medical Center after suffering from avascular necrosis or hip core - “bone death,” last November. On October 10, she underwent a successful 2 hours hip replacement.

Panganiban's Ebela Farm in Tanauan, Batangas was named after her mother, Annabelle “Ebela” Panganiban (February 3, 1963 - August 20, 2024).

== Filmography ==
=== Film ===
Year	Title	Role	Notes
1993	Antipolo Massacre		
1993	Kadenang Bulaklak	Little Violy	
1994	Separada	Jenny	FAMAS Award for Best Child Actress
1994	Lipa Massacre	Chelsea Arandia	
1995	Sarah... Ang Munting Prinsesa	Becky	Nominated–FAMAS Award for Best Child Actress
1996	Ang TV The Movie: The Adarna Adventure	Aya	
1996	Ama, Ina, Anak	Issa	Nominated–FAMAS Award for Best Child Actress
1997	Hanggang Kailan Kita Mamahalin?	Justine	Nominated–FAMAS Award for Best Child Actress
1997	Ang Pulubi at Ang Prinsesa	Nikka	
1998	Magandang Hatinggabi	Myla	
2000	Daddy O, Baby O	Nina	
2001	Mila	Lani	
2001	Tabi Tabi Po	Agnes	Episode 3: Demonyita
2002	Jologs	Party Guest	
2003	Dayo	Cameo Role	
2003	Ang Tanging Ina	Gretchen	
2004	Mano Po 3: My Love	Young Lilia	
2004	Santa Santita	Malen	Nominated–ENPRESS Golden Screen Award for Best Actress (Drama); Nominated–FAMAS Award for Best Actress
2006	All About Love	Kikay	
2006	Pitong Dalagita	Joyce	
2006	Matakot Ka Sa Karma	Trina	
2006	White Lady	Christina	
2007	A Love Story	Karyn Torres	FAP Award for Best Supporting Actress; Nominated–ENPRESS Golden Screen Award for Best Supporting Actress
2009	Manila	Sydney	
2009	I Love You, Goodbye	Lizette Jimenez	Nominated–FAMAS Award for Best Actress
2010	Here Comes The Bride	Stefanie (Bride)	ENPRESS Golden Screen Award for Best Actress (Comedy/Musical); GMMSF Box-Office Entertainment Award for Comedy Actress of the Year
2011	Bulong	Oprah	
2011	Segunda Mano	Mariela/Marie Domingo	FAMAS Award for Best Supporting Actress
2012	Every Breath U Take	Majoy Marasigan	Nominated–FAP Award for Best Actress
2012	Madaling Araw Mahabang Gabi		
2012	24/7 in Love	Verna Francisco	Main role
2012	One More Try	Jacqueline Mendoza	Nominated–ENPRESS Golden Screen Award for Best Actress (Drama); Nominated–FAMAS Award for Best Actress; Nominated–Metro Manila Film Festival Award for Best Actress; GMMSF Box-Office Entertainment Award for Film Actress of the Year (shared with Angel Locsin)
2013	Alamat ni China Doll	Helen	Cinema One Originals Film Festival Best Actress Award
2014	Beauty in a Bottle	Estelle Suarez	
2014	That Thing Called Tadhana	Mace Castillo	Nominated–Guam International Film Festival Achievement in Acting Award; Cinema One Originals Film Festival Best Actress Award; Gawad TANGLAW Best Actress (tied with Nora Aunor)
2016	Whistleblower		
2016	The Unmarried Wife	Anne Victorio	FAMAS Award for Best Actress; Gawad Bedista Actress Of The Year; Nominated–19th Gawad Pasado Awards for Pinakapasadong Aktres
2018	Ang Dalawang Mrs. Reyes	Cindy Reyes	
2018	Exes Baggage	Pia	
2019	Unbreakable	Deena Yambao	
2020	Love Lockdown	Lesley	
2020	Hayop Ka!	Nimfaa	
2021	Love or Money	Angel Dela Cerna	Main role
2025	Unmarry	Celine	Official for the 51st Metro Manila Film Festival Entry Nominated–Metro Manila Film Festival Award for Best Actress Winner - Best Film Actress Platinum Stallion Awards 2026 Asia Pacific Top Notch Best Performances 2025 - Special Citation for Best Performance of 2025 FAMAS Awards 2026 - Best Actress (nominee) PMPC Star Awards For Movies 2026 - Movie Actress Of The Year (nominee) EDDY's Awards 2026 - Best Actress (nominee) Gawad Dangal 2026 - Best Actress (nominee)

=== Television ===
Year	Title	Role	Notes	Source
1994	Maalaala Mo Kaya	Angelica	Episode: "Sa kandungan mo inay"	
1995	Kadenang Kristal	Mariella		
1995–2016; 2019–present	ASAP	Herself / Host / Performer		
1995–97	Ang TV	Herself / Various roles	Third season batch	
1995–96	Familia Zaragoza	Angelica Lagrimas		
1995	Maalaala Mo Kaya	Anita	Episode: "Palayok at pintura"	
1995	Maalaala Mo Kaya	Maan	Episode: "Durian"	
1995	Maalaala Mo Kaya	Sally	Episode: "Balon"	
1996	Maalaala Mo Kaya	Jing-Jing	Episode: "Lubid"	
1997–2004	Wansapanataym	Lin / Glen	Episode "Twinkle"	
1997–2004	Wansapanataym	Melchora	Episode "Melchora Meets Cedie"	
1997–2004	Wansapanataym	Grace	Episode "Ang Mahiwagang Halaman"	
1997–2004	Wansapanataym	Anna	Episode "Mall Alone"	
1997–2004	Wansapanataym		Episode "Kerubin Liit"	
1997–2004	Wansapanataym	Vina	Episode "White Family"	
1997–2004	Wansapanataym	Princess Bryarose	Episode "Wake Up, Little Rosie, Wake Up"	
1997–2004	Wansapanataym	Nora	Episode "Doble Nora"	
1997–2004	Wansapanataym	Clara	Episode "Witch Kids"	
1997	Maalaala Mo Kaya	Leleng	Episode: "Rattle"	
1997	Maalaala Mo Kaya	Monette	Episode: "Manika"	
1998	Maalaala Mo Kaya	Elizabeth "Beth"	Episode: "Kinky Hair"	
1998	Ipaglaban Mo!	Lucy	Episode: "Bakit Ako Pa?"	
1998	Ipaglaban Mo!	Maya	Episode: "Paltos ng Pagmamahal"	
1998	Ipaglaban Mo!	Lala	Episode: "Wanna Buy Baby?"	
1998	Ipaglaban Mo!	Paula	Episode: "Sino ang Maysala"	
1999–2002	G-mik	Angelica "Jelai" Rivera		
2001–03	Sa Puso Ko Iingatan Ka	Abby De Guzman		
2001	Maalaala Mo Kaya	Kayla	Episode: " Jigsaw Puzzle"	
2001	Maalaala Mo Kaya	Cheryl	Episode: "Gitara"	
2002–04	Berks	Nicole		
2003	Maalaala Mo Kaya	Julie Vega	Episode: "Unan"	
2004	Mangarap Ka	Catherine / Cutie	Main Role / Protagonist	
2005–06	Vietnam Rose	Đoàn Đăng Thiên Tín	Main Role / Anti-Hero	
2005	Maalaala Mo Kaya	Marissa	Episode: "Guhit"	
2005	Maalaala Mo Kaya	Jovi	Episode: "Paru-paru"	
2006	Your Song		Episode: "Can't Let You Go"	
2006	Komiks	Lorelei	Episode: "Si Piolo At Si Lorelei"	
2006	Star Magic Presents	Belle	Episode: "Deal or No Deal"	
2006	Star Magic Presents	Angel	Episode: "The Sweetest Victory"	
2006	Love Spell	Princess	Episode: "Home Switch Home"	
2006	Your Song		Episode: "Silent Night"	
2007	Rounin	Aura	Main Role / Protagonist	
2007	Your Song		Episode: "Upside Down"	
2007	Ysabella	Venice	Special guest	
2007	Love Spell	Wena	Episode: "My Soulfone"	
2007–08	Maging Sino Ka Man: Ang Pagbabalik	Maria Elena "Lena" Rubio-Madrigal	Main Role / Antagonist	
2008	Your Song	Ria	Episode: "I'll Take Care Of You"	
2008	Maalaala Mo Kaya	Inday	Episode: "Isda"	
2008	Iisa Pa Lamang	Scarlet Dela Rhea-Castillejos	Main Role / Antagonist / Protagonist	
2008–2020	Banana Sundae	Herself / Various roles		
2009	Your Song	Sheila	Episode: "Open Arms"	
2009	Your Song	Tammy	Episode: "Feb-Ibig - Kung Pwede Lang Sana"	
2010	Rubi	Rubi Perez-Ferrer / Theresa Dela Fuente	Bida-kontrabida (Villainous protagonist)	
2011	100 Days to Heaven	Claire	Guest antagonist	
2013	Apoy sa Dagat	Rosanna "Serena Mirasol" del Sol / Rebecca del Sol	Both main protagonist Dual role	
2014	Maalaala Mo Kaya	Susan	Episode: "Lipstick"	
2015–16	Pangako Sa 'Yo	Madam Claudia Zalameda-Buenavista	Main Role / Antagonist	
2016	FPJ's Ang Probinsyano	Marta Maglipon / SPO3 Jade Blanco	Minor antagonist	
2017	Maalaala Mo Kaya	Teenage Karla Estrada	Episode: "Autograph"	
2017	Ipaglaban Mo!	Claire Isidro-Martinez	Episode: "Bugbog"	
2018–19	Playhouse	Patricia "Patty" Calumpang	Main Role / Protagonist	
2019	Call Me Tita	Gabbi	Main Role / Protagonist	
2020–21	Walang Hanggang Paalam	Celine Delgado	Main Role / Protagonist	
2022	The Kangks Show	Dr. Kara Teo	Main Role / Protagonist	
2022	The Goodbye Girl	Yanna	Main Role / Protagonist	
2025	It's Showtime	Herself / Guest Performer		
2025	Maalaala Mo Kaya	Angelyn Catacutan	Episode: Camera	
2026	The Silent Noise	Jackie		

=== Theater ===
Year	Title	Role	Source
2025	Don't Meow for Me, Catriona	Phoebe	

Year	Title	Role
Don't Meow for Me, Catriona	Phoebe	

== Awards and nominations ==
Panganiban's accolades include three FAMAS Award, four Box Office Entertainment Awards, three Golden Screen Television Awards, two PMPC Star Awards for Movies, two KBP Golden Dove Awards, a Luna Award, a Golden Screen Movie Award, an EdukCircle Award, a Gawad Tanglaw Award including nominations from Guam International Film Festival, a Gawad Urian Award, Gawad Genio Award and The EDDYS Award nomination.
