= 5 and Up =

Philippine television infotainment show

- Title card
- Genre: Infotainment
- Country of origin: Philippines
- Original languages: English (1992–99); Tagalog (1999–2003)

Production
- Executive producer: Cheche Lazaro
- Camera setup: Multiple-camera setup
- Running time: 60 minutes
- Production companies: Probe Media Foundation, Inc.; Philippine Children's Television Foundation

Original release
- Network: ABC (1992–94, 2002–03); GMA Network; (1994–2002)
- Release: May 16, 1992 – 2003

5 and Up is a Philippine television infotainment show broadcast by GMA Network. It premiered on May 16, 1992, on ABC and later moved to GMA Network. The show concluded in 2003.

== Hosts ==
Hosts

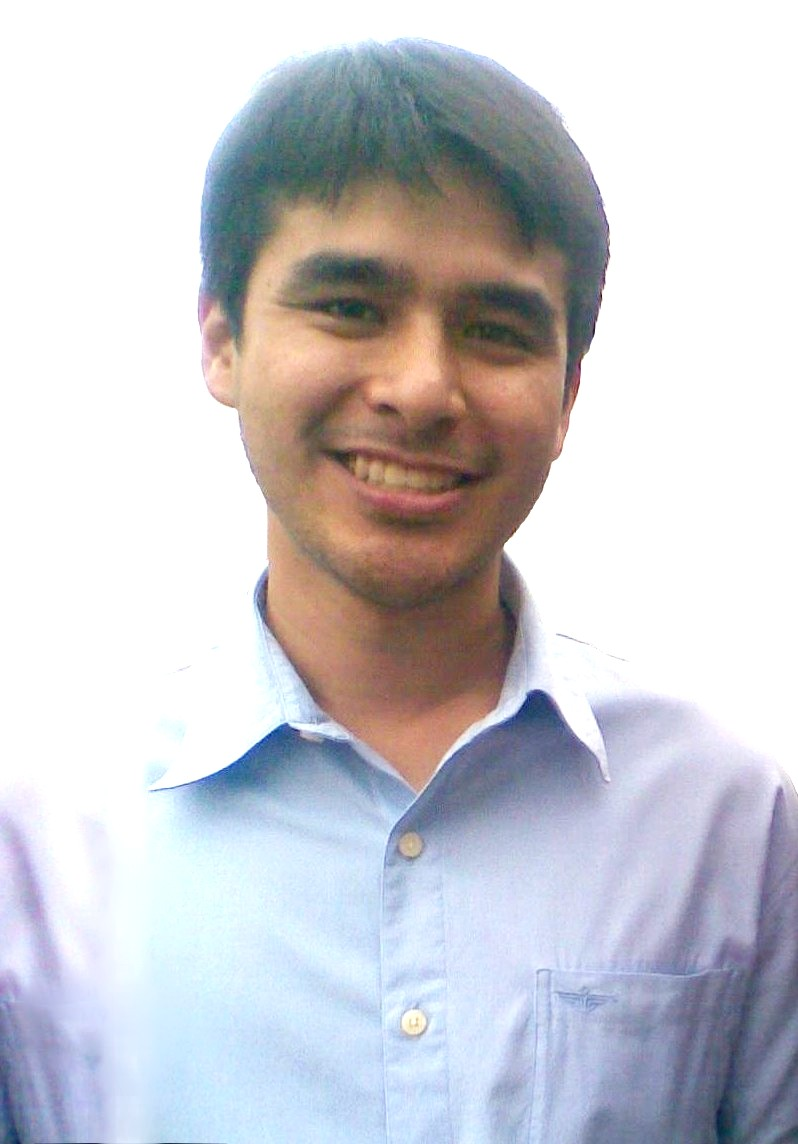
Atom Araullo

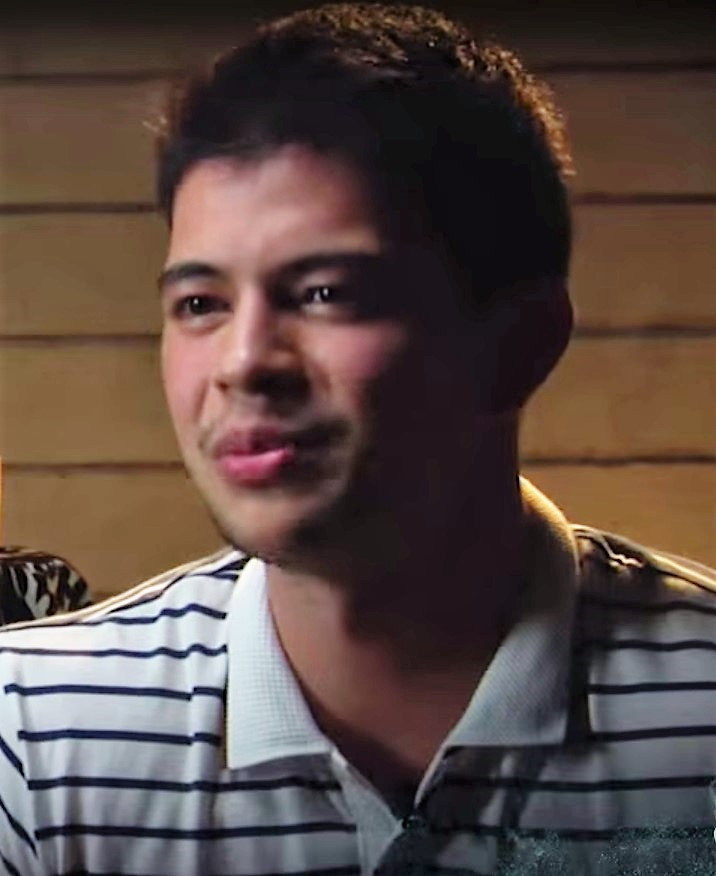
Rayver Cruz

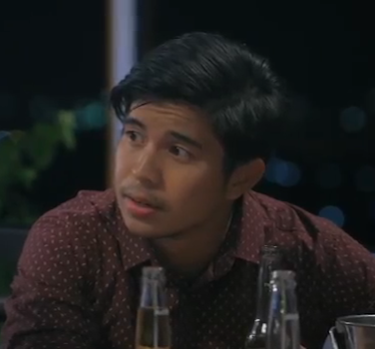
Rodjun Cruz

- Alex Amado
- Alwien Raidene Lacanilao
- Anya Benitez
- Arthur Anthony Cipriano
- Atom Araullo
- Byron Abao
- Carlo Mendoza
- Chiyomi Rances
- Chuck Grey
- Chynna Ortaleza
- Diego Maranan
- Eliza Agabin
- Enzo Marcos
- Frances Fleta
- Giancarlo Hilario
- Giggles Arceo
- Ian Tugas
- Jennifer Cremen
- Jessica Gallegos
- Jolly Estaris
- John Laurence Patulan
- Joseton Vergel de Dios
- Josh Matic
- Justine de Jesus
- Kai de Veyra
- Krianne Maniego
- Lily Anne Casimiro
- Luigi Exconde
- Luz Yballe
- Maureen Araneta
- Maxene Magalona
- Melvin Abundo
- Nicai de Guzman
- Nina Serquina
- Nina Torres
- Oly Fernando
- Pamela Cajilig
- Paolo Olbes
- Patrick da Silva
- Phoebe Cabaluna
- Rayver Cruz
- Rex Ian Sayson
- Rodjun Cruz
- Rookie Camaclang
- Rupert Eustaquio
- Satin Abad
- Tin Tin Leones
- Veronica Dorotheo
- Wilroy Dilao
- Xavi Gonzalez
- Zak Yuson

== Accolades ==
Accolades received by 5 and Up
Year	Award	Category	Recipient	Result	Ref.
1996	New York Festival	Gold Medal Award	5 and Up	Won	
1999	Asian Television Awards	Highly Recommended	5 and Up	Won	
2001	Asian Television Awards	Best Children's Program in Asia	5 and Up	Won	
2001	UNICEF Prize	Prix Jeunesse	5 and Up	Won	
2002	Asian Television Awards	Highly Recommended	5 and Up	Won	

- Best Children's Show, PMPC Star Awards for TV (1992–93, 1994–96, 1999–2003)
- Winner, KBP Golden Dove Awards (1992–2002)
- Winner, Catholic Mass Media Awards (1992–2002)
- Winner, Gawad CCP Para Sa Telebisyon (1992-2000)
