= Atom Araullo =

Filipino broadcast journalist and television presenter (born 1982)

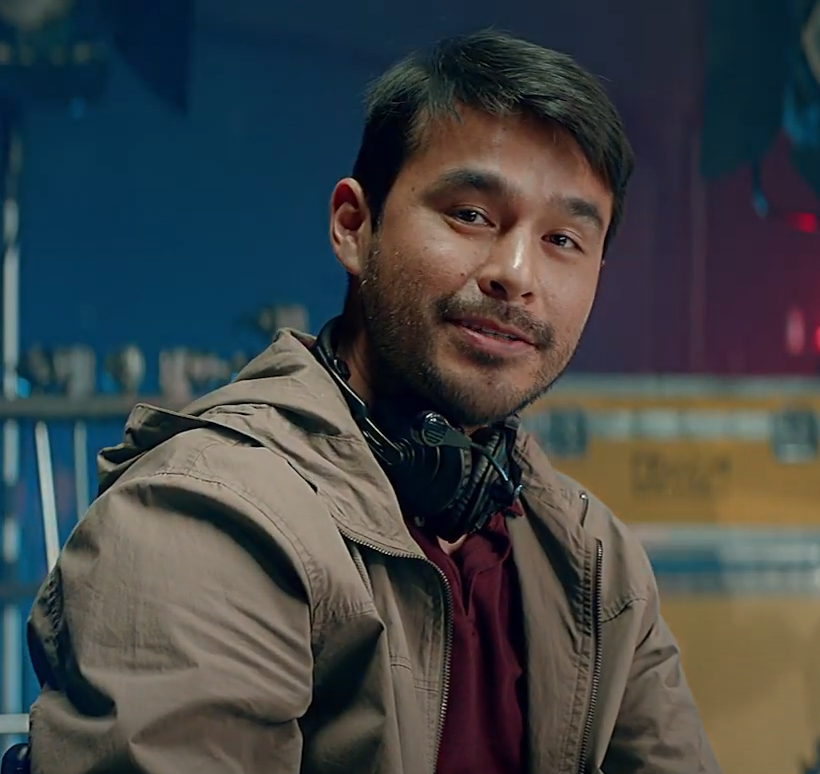
- Araullo in 2019
- Born: Alfonso Tomas Pagaduan Araullo; October 19, 1982 (age 44); Quezon City, Philippines
- Education: University of the Philippines Diliman, (BS)
- Occupations: Broadcast journalist; television presenter
- Years active: 1993–present
- Employers: GMA Network (2004–2005; 2017–present); ABS-CBN Corporation (2005–2017)
- Agent: ALL KAPS Talent Management Agency

Alfonso Tomas "Atom" Pagaduan Araullo (Tagalog: [ʔaˈɾaʊljɔ]; born October 19, 1982) is a Filipino broadcast journalist. He currently hosts documentary programs such as The Atom Araullo Specials and I-Witness, and is serving as the anchor of newscast State of the Nation.

Araullo is a national Goodwill Ambassador for the United Nations High Commissioner for Refugees and was conferred the title after undertaking missions to visit displaced families in Mindanao, Bangladesh, and Jordan.

He is also an advocate for environmental conservation, notably in marine ecosystems. He received a star on the Eastwood City Walk of Fame on November 21, 2017.

== Early life and education ==
Alfonso Tomas Pagaduan Araullo was born on October 19, 1982, the youngest child and only son of Miguel (nicknamed "Mike") and Carol Araullo (née Pagaduan). He has an older sister, Alessandra "Sandra" (née Araullo) Gonzales, who is a triathlete as well. Being the son of an activist family, Araullo spent most of his early childhood days with his parents battling it out during the Marcos dictatorship. His mother was imprisoned and tortured during the Marcos administration. This has exposed him to the political struggle in the country. During his early elementary school days, his parents exposed him to sports and the theater. As a result, he became part of several plays and has joined various competitions as a triathlete.

He finished his elementary education at Ateneo de Manila University, and his high school education at the Philippine Science High School Main Campus. Araullo graduated with a Bachelor of Science degree in Applied Physics from the University of the Philippines Diliman. There he became a member of the League of Filipino Students (LFS), as well as the chairperson of the Student Alliance for the Advancement of Democratic Rights - UP (STAND-UP). He also won as Councilor in the UP Diliman University Student Council elections of 2003, garnering the highest number of votes.

== Career ==
=== 1993–2003: Early beginnings ===
During his childhood years, Araullo was part of 5 and Up (produced by Probe Productions, Inc.). He also used to host the Studio 23 morning show Breakfast, the National Quiz Bee, Probe Media Foundation Inc.'s Kabataan Xpress, Basta Sports and Kalye: Mga Kwento ng Lansangan with Anthony Taberna and Sol Aragones.

=== 2004–2017: Beginnings as GMA News reporter and transfer to ABS-CBN ===
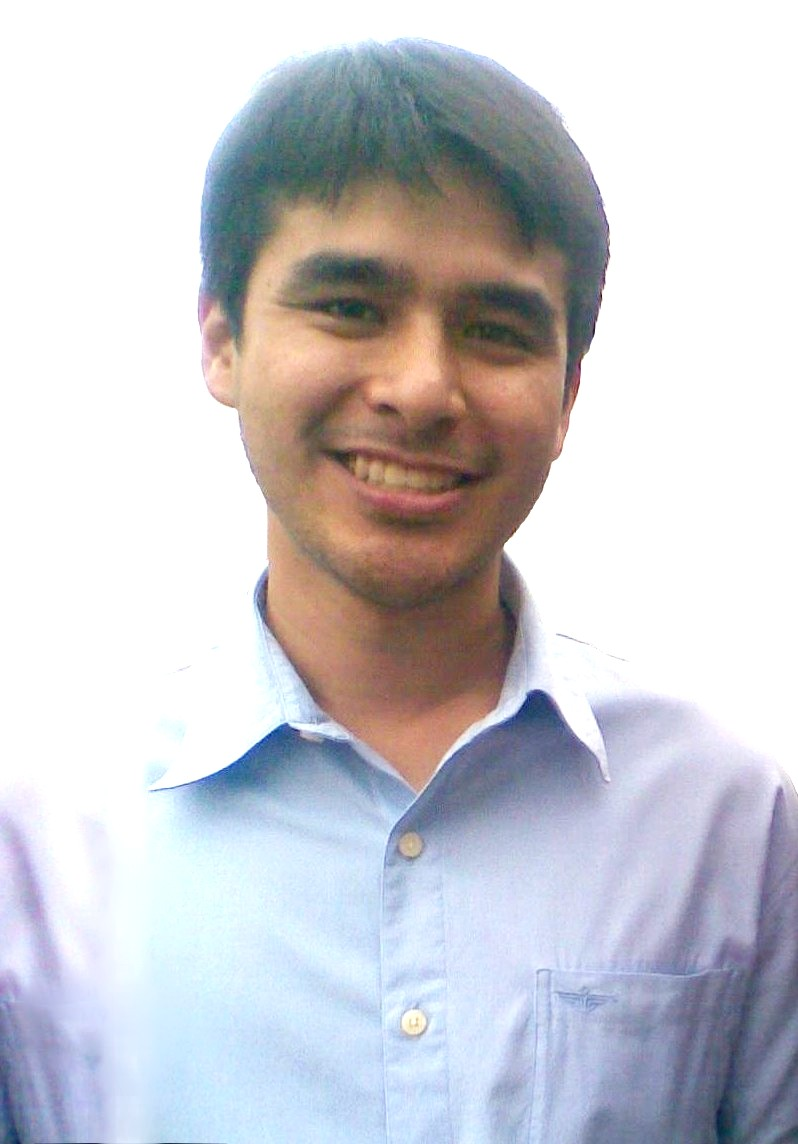
Araullo in 2009

Araullo started his news-reporting career with GMA Network where he featured in the "ATOMic Sports" segment of 24 Oras. He moved to ABS-CBN in 2005. He hosted Red Alert and Umagang Kay Ganda.

Initially rumored, Araullo confirmed his resignation as a news reporter of ABS-CBN News and Current Affairs, specifically from his reportorial duties on TV Patrol, Bandila, and the ABS-CBN News Channel (ANC) in late August 2016. He explained that he wanted to explore opportunities and pursue other interests, debunking the rumor that he opted for resignation because of his strong opinions.

=== 2017–present: Return to GMA Network ===
In September 2017, Araullo left ABS-CBN. He returned to GMA Network that same month, where he focused on making documentaries, starting with Philippine Seas. Months later, Araullo joined the longest-running documentary program i-Witness, and also became the host of his own monthly documentary program The Atom Araullo Specials in 2018.

"Munting Bisig", an episode from The Atom Araullo Specials, won a silver award in the human concerns and social issues category at the Cannes Corporate Media and TV Awards. The episode also won in the social issues category at the New York Festivals TV and Film Awards 2022 and best Asian documentary at the Asia Contents Awards.

In January 2021, Araullo is chosen to take over along with Maki Pulido as the anchors of GMA News TV (later GTV) newscast State of the Nation, replacing Jessica Soho who decided to retire at the end of 2020.

==== Legal cases ====
In December 2024, the Quezon City Regional Trial Court promulgated a P2-million fine judgment against Lorraine Badoy-Partosa and Jeffrey "Ka Eric" Celiz for red-baiting Araullo.

=== Other activities ===
Araullo wrote and starred in Mike de Leon's Citizen Jake (2018), playing a son of corrupt senator-turned-citizen journalist Jacobo "Jake" Herrera Jr. In 2025, he released his first book, titled A View From The Ground, an account of his experiences as a journalist.

== Personal life ==
In November 2025, Araullo admitted that he is in a long-term committed relationship with girlfriend Zen Hernandez.

== Filmography ==
=== Television ===
Year	Title	Notes	Source
1992–2002	5 and Up	Host	
2004	24 Oras	ATOMic Sports host	
2004–06	KNN: Kabataan News Network	Host	
2006	Basta Sports	Host	
2006–07	Breakfast	Host	
2008–09	Kalye: Mga Kwento ng Lansangan	Host	
2009–10; 2013–17	Umagang Kay Ganda	Host	
2012–17	Pinoy True Stories	Hiwaga, RealiTV and Red Alert host	
2017	Philippine Seas	Host	
2017–present	i-Witness	Host	
2018–present	The Atom Araullo Specials	Host	
2021–present	State of the Nation	Anchor	

=== Radio ===
- Red Alert sa DZMM (DZMM Radyo Patrol 630) (2013–2017)

=== Online ===
Year	Title	Source
2018	GMA ONE Online Exclusives: Adulting with Atom Araullo	
2019–21	Stand For Truth	

=== Film ===
Year	Title	Role	Notes	Source
2018	Citizen Jake	Jacobo "Jake" Herrera Jr.	Billed as "Featuring"	

== Awards and nominations ==
Year	Award giving body	Category	Nominated work	Results	Source
2008	22nd PMPC Star Awards for TV	Best Public Affairs Program Host	Y Speak	Nominated	
2013	27th PMPC Star Awards for TV	Best Morning Show Host (shared with Umagang Kay Ganda host)	Umagang Kay Ganda	Nominated	
2013	27th PMPC Star Awards for TV	Best Documentary Program Host	Hiwaga	Nominated	
2014	28th PMPC Star Awards for TV	Best Documentary Program Host	Hiwaga	Nominated	
2015	USTv Awards	Student Leaders’ Choice for TV Personality	Hiwaga	Won	
2015	Platinum Stallion Media Awards	Most Trusted Field Reporter Award	TV Patrol	Won	
2016	USTv Awards	Student Leaders’ Choice of TV Personality		Won	
2016	USTv Awards	Students' Choice of Social Media Personality		Won	
2016	Golden Laurel: Lycean Choice Media Awards	Best Morning Show Host	Umagang Kay Ganda	Won	
2017	2017 New York Festivals	World's Best TV and Films	Documentary: Warmer (Climate Change)	Won (bronze medal)	
2017	Gandingan Awards	Best Public Service Program Host	Red Alert	Won	
2017	2017 PMPC Star Awards for Television	Best Morning Show Host (shared with Umagang Kay Ganda host)	Umagang Kay Ganda	Won	
