= Ang Lalaking Nagmahal Sa Akin =

- Title card
- Genre: Drama; Romance; Comedy
- Based on: Ang Lalaking Nagmahal Sa Akin by Vanessa
- Developed by: Enrico Santos
- Directed by: Wenn V. Deramas
- Starring: Toni Gonzaga; Derek Ramsay
- Opening theme: "Way Back Into Love" by Sam Milby and Toni Gonzaga
- Country of origin: Philippines
- Original language: Filipino
- No. of episodes: 35

Production
- Executive producer: Laurenti Dyogi
- Running time: 13–28 minutes
- Production company: Precious Hearts Romances

Original release
- Network: ABS-CBN
- Release: August 31 – October 16, 2009

Ang Lalaking Nagmahal Sa Akin (transl. The Man Who Loved Me) is a 2009 Philippine television drama romance series broadcast by ABS-CBN. The series is based on the Filipino pocket book novel of the same title created by Vanessa, the series is the second installment of Precious Hearts Romances Presents. Directed by Wenn V. Deramas, it stars Toni Gonzaga and Derek Ramsay. It aired on the network's Hapontastic line up and worldwide on TFC from August 31 to October 16, 2009, replacing Precious Hearts Romances Presents: Bud Brothers and was replaced by Precious Hearts Romances Presents: Somewhere in My Heart.

This series is currently available on IWant and Jeepney TV's Youtube Channel.

== Synopsis ==
The show follows Flor (Toni Gonzaga), who gambles to find a decent job in the city to provide for her mother and two brothers. She ends up working as a chambermaid in a first-class hotel where she meets the gorgeous and womanizing owner Zephy (Derek Ramsay), who will fall in love with her.

Zephy willingly turns his back on his wealth just to be with his beloved, but Flor still has to make the toughest choice in her life----to give a better life for her family or fulfill the desire of her heart.

== Cast and characters ==
=== Main cast ===
- Toni Gonzaga as Flor Magpantay - a kindhearted and hardworking girl from the province who will work as a hotel chambermaid in the city to provide for her family.
- Derek Ramsay as Zephyrus "Zephy" McNally - the handsome owner of the hotel where Flor works. He will learn from Flor that money can't buy true love

=== Supporting cast ===
- Carla Humphries as Sophie Mendez
- Janus del Prado as Dominador "Dina" Magpantay
- Shamaine Centenera as Cita Magpantay
- Franzen Fajardo as Jerrimo Magpantay
- Ketchup Eusebio as Jericho Magpantay
- DJ Durano as Greg
- Beatriz Saw as Helen
- Dionne Monsanto as Maya
- Crispin Pineda as Konsehal
- Tess Antonio
- Frances Ignacio as Olga
- Carla Martinez as Lorly McNally

=== Guest cast ===
- Angel Sy as Young Flor
- Lou Veloso as Don Felipe
- Dianne Medina as Nikki
- Nikki Valdez as Vicky
- Erwin Aurella as Beauty Pageant Host

== See also ==
- List of programs broadcast by ABS-CBN
- Precious Hearts Romances Presents
