= That Thing Called Tadhana =

2014 romantic comedy film by Antoinette Jadaone

- Theatrical release poster
- Directed by: Antoinette Jadaone
- Written by: Antoinette Jadaone
- Produced by: Ronald Arguelles
- Starring: Angelica Panganiban; JM de Guzman
- Cinematography: Sasha Palomares
- Edited by: Benjamin Tolentino
- Music by: Emerzon Texon
- Production companies: Cinema One Originals; Epicmedia; Monoxide Works; One Dash Zero Cinetools
- Distributed by: ABS-CBN Film Productions
- Release dates: November 10, 2014 (C1OFF); February 4, 2015
- Running time: 110 minutes
- Country: Philippines
- Languages: Filipino; English
- Budget: ₱2 million
- Box office: ₱134 million

That Thing Called Tadhana (International title: That Thing Called Destiny) is a 2014 Filipino romantic comedy film written and directed by Antoinette Jadaone. Starring Angelica Panganiban, who previously worked with the filmmaker in Beauty in a Bottle, and JM de Guzman, the story follows Mace and Antony, who meet at an airport in Rome and decide to travel together upon arriving in the Philippines. As Mace tries to move on from a failed relationship, and Anthony deals with his own disappointments, they develop a deepening kinship.

A co-production of Cinema One Originals, Epicmedia, Monoxide Works, and One Dash Zero Cinetools and distributed by ABS-CBN Film Productions, the film premiered on November 10, 2014, as part of Cinema One Originals Film Festival, and later received a commercial release on February 4, 2015.

== Plot ==
=== Rome ===
The film starts at an airport in Rome where Mace, on her way back to the Philippines, despairs over which of her personal items to keep so she does not exceed the load requirements. As she bemoans her fate and cries over her dilemma, Anthony shows up and offers to carry her extra baggage for her through his unused extra baggage allowance. Mace later reveals that her whole life is in her luggage.

On the plane, Mace watches and emotionally connects with the protagonists of the film One More Chance but vehemently declines the pack of tissues offered to her.

=== Manila ===
Upon arrival at NAIA, they go to a Japanese restaurant after Mace expresses her reluctance to go straight home. Anthony shares his reasons for being in Rome but finds that Mace does not share the amazement. Their small talk is cut short when a fellow patron, who has nonchalantly been ignoring an incoming call, irritates Mace. Much later, Mace questions the merit of leaving the future of one's relationship to the winds of fate, or what destiny has to dictate, and declares that it did not sit well with her because she would have done something about it. She then begins to talk about her relationship that just recently ended. An eight-year-long relationship that was broken in just seven words. They later on end up in a karaoke bar where they sing "Where Do Broken Hearts Go" together. In a drunken stupor, Mace tells Anthony that she wants to go to Baguio.

On the bus to Baguio, Mace associates a film being shown to a memory she has with her ex-boyfriend. Then at a stopover, after she does the same to everything that Anthony comes up with, she strikes up a deal with him as a means of conditioning herself against the habit. Still, Mace cannot help but ask "- how does one forget?" and "- how long does one take to do it?". Anthony points out that "- what's important is to forget" - how and how long was "- up to her".

=== Baguio ===
In Baguio, Mace makes up her mind about what to do next, declines Anthony's offer to help and lugs her baggage around on her own - something that, although slow, is still manageable. At an art exhibit, Mace discovers Anthony's unfulfilled passion for painting overshadowed by a life driven by requirements and deadlines. So, over lunch, she asks Anthony to illustrate a short story she has written in college entitled "The Arrow with a Heart Pierced Through Him". Later that night, Mace awakens from a dream involving her ex-boyfriend. Anthony reveals that his dream has been of the two of them just walking along Session Road.

Inside a café in Session Road, Mace talks about how she waited eight years for a question that never came. Anthony admits to having been unprepared and shares the loss and pain that he has suffered thereafter along with all other sorts of questions that has gone unanswered. Mace then quotes F. Scott Fitzgerald back to him.

Outside the café, Anthony reassures her that she is not ugly at all, tells her that she will recover because it is impossible for an overwhelming love like hers to be wasted or go unreciprocated and quotes Popoy's line from One More Chance. He also reveals to her what he has done in order to forget and move on from his ex-girlfriend who has long since moved on and forgotten about him.

=== Sagada ===
Upon arriving in Sagada, Mace realizes that their belongings have been left behind. While a frantic Anthony tries to negotiate a way to go back, Mace tells him that the baggage does not matter anymore in her present life. As they await for the jeepney bound for Mount Kiltepan, in the freezing cold, Anthony gallantly drapes his sweater across her shoulders and for the first time spend a few minutes together in thoughtful silence.

They arrive at the camp late in the evening, lie down next to the fire beneath the open sky and talk about what they will wish for if a shooting star was to appear. They drift off to sleep, content with the idea that their wishes will surely be granted.

The next day dawns and they run together to a place at the edge of the mountain and a sea of clouds. There, Mace unloads herself of everything, screams all of her anger, all of her pain and of everything she has been unable say to her ex-boyfriend.

=== Epilogue ===
Mace asks about what they did upon reaching the far end of Session Road in his dream. Anthony reveals that he woke up before he got to that part but tells her that if he were to add something to it, it would be that she turns to him slowly to say she will forget her ex-boyfriend.

After a brief moment of silence, Mace replies and says "I will forget him."

Anthony walks Mace home when they find her ex Marco waiting for Mace with a bouquet of flowers asking for another chance. Anthony and Mace are shocked. Anthony leaves to give them some time to talk.

On his way home Anthony is shocked with the events of the past few days but manages to smile.

Mace’s short story plays. The Arrow feels heavier than usual even after losing The Heart pierced through him. The Arrow keeps on going until he meets The Heart again.

The story resumes, showing Anthony driving through Manila, thinking about what Mace said about leaving your fate to the wind. He says to himself that if you really love someone, you should go for it and not wait for the wind to blow her back to you and that you should pull so hard and not let go as long as you can.

Some time later, Anthony decides to illustrate Mace's story and prepares to deliver it to her.

== Cast ==
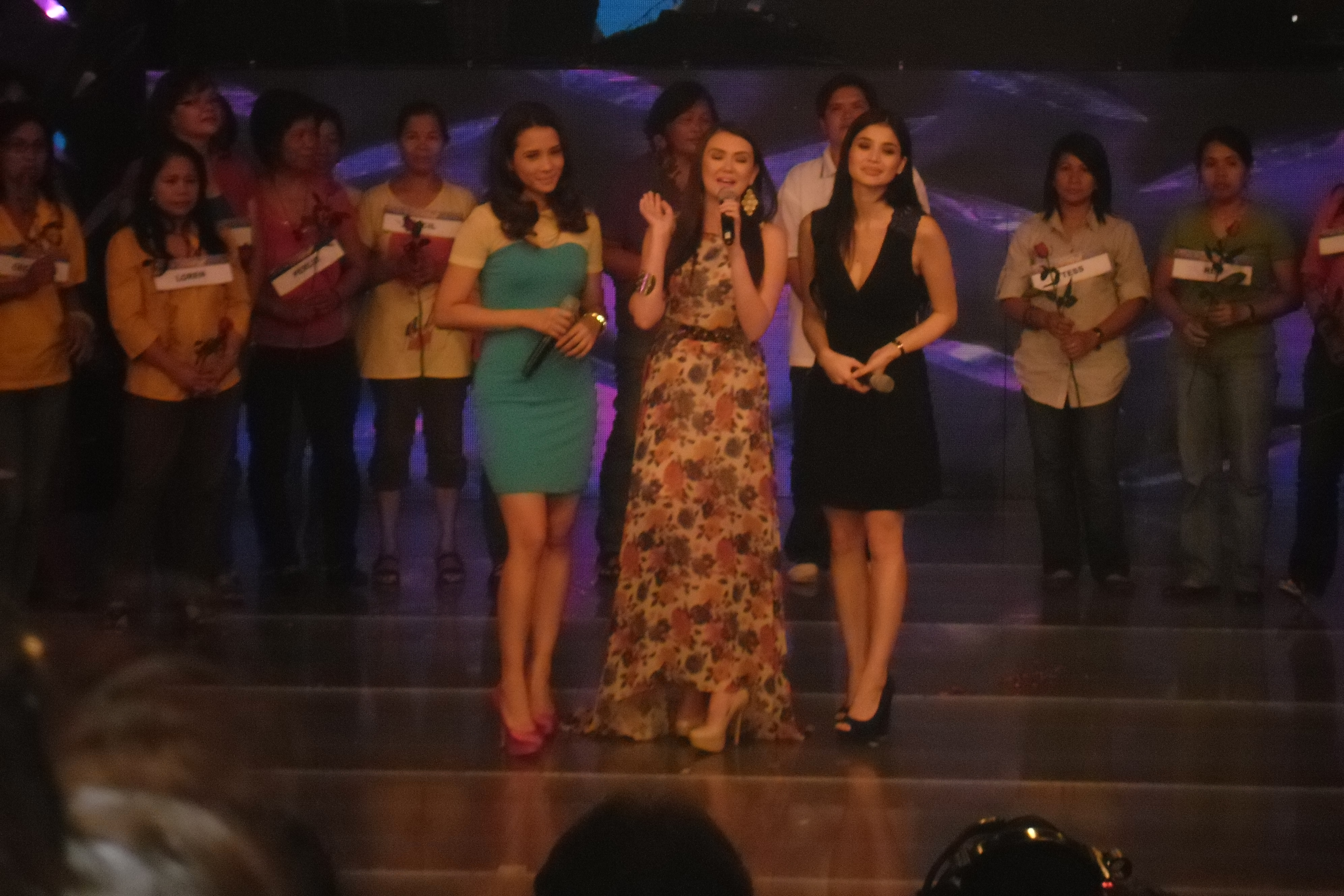
Angelica Panganiban portrays Mace Castillo.

- Angelica Panganiban as Mace Castillo, who has been to Rome to surprise her boyfriend only to find out that he already has someone else. She then undergoes a self-imposed catharsis with Anthony's help and travels with him to Baguio and Sagada to find out the answer to "where do broken hearts go?".
- JM de Guzman as Anthony Lagdameo, a fellow passenger who offers Mace a solution to her problem on excess baggage. He is able to establish trust, then a connection and eventually travels with Mace as she tries to get over the abrupt end of an eight-year relationship.
- Joem Bascon as Marco, Mace's boyfriend of eight years who extends his stay in Italy for his job and enters into a relationship with someone else. Mace claims that he looks like John Lloyd Cruz and can associate many things with him.

== Production ==
Director Antoinette Jadaone considers That Thing Called Tadhana as her "dream project" and described it as "more than 10 years’ worth of love stories, heartaches, heartbreaks, bitterness and acceptance". The lead protagonist, Mace was first drafted during 2014 while Jadaone was filming for Relaks, It's Just Pagibig, the character had a cameo appearance in the said film but was played by Alessandra De Rossi as opposed to Panganiban.

The film makes use of Whitney Houston's song "Where Do Broken Hearts Go", inflating the cost beyond the film's ₱2 million budget awarded by the film festival. The crew turned to donations from fans on Facebook to raise funds to obtain the rights to the song before its film festival premiere.

== Release ==
That Thing Called Tadhana was met with both commercial and critical success and was praised as one of the highest grossing Filipino independent film of all time, breaching ₱134 million gross revenue in under 3 weeks, despite facing piracy issues online during its run. It was graded "A" by the Cinema Evaluation Board and given a PG rating by the MTRCB.

== Reception ==
=== Critical response ===
ClickTheCity.com's Philbert Ortiz Dy praised the film by giving a 5 stars out of 5 rating. He writes:

That Thing Called Tadhana strips romance down to its core. Our movies have become needlessly complicated. They are stories about people from different worlds, overcoming incredible odds to end up kissing each other in the end. This movie, on the other hand, is just about two people spending time with each other, slowly falling in love. It is about just needing someone to be there when you can’t bring yourself to finish the song you’re singing at karaoke. It’s about the simple, beautiful feeling of having somebody to keep the song going.

Oggs Cruz of Rappler writes in a positive review:

Antoinette Jadaone's That Thing Called Tadhana relishes the simplicity of its premise. It never strays towards the unlikely situations that most romantic comedies rely on for pageantry. The film keeps its feet firmly grounded within the realm of reality. With convincing performances from Angelica Panganiban and JM de Guzman, the film effortlessly evokes both the palpable pain of losing love and the alluring pleasure of gaining it back.

=== Accolades ===
List of accolades
Award	Category	Recipient(s)	Outcome
2014 Cinema One Originals Film Festival
2014 Cinema One Originals Film Festival	Best Actress	Angelica Panganiban	Won
2014 Cinema One Originals Film Festival	Best Picture	That Thing Called Tadhana	Nominated
2014 Cinema One Originals Film Festival	Audience Choice	That Thing Called Tadhana	Won
2014 Cinema One Originals Film Festival	Champion Bughaw Award for Full-length Feature	That Thing Called Tadhana	Won
13th Gawad Tanglaw Awards
13th Gawad Tanglaw Awards	Best Actress	Angelica Panganiban	Won
2014 Don Carlos Palanca Memorial Awards for Literature
2014 Don Carlos Palanca Memorial Awards for Literature	Best Screenplay	Antoinette Jadaone	3rd place
38th Gawad Urian Awards
38th Gawad Urian Awards	Best Actress	Angelica Panganiban	Nominated
38th Gawad Urian Awards	Best Actor	JM De Guzman	Nominated
38th Gawad Urian Awards	Best Screenplay	Antoinette Jadaone	Nominated
38th Gawad Urian Awards	Best Cinematography	Sasha Palomares	Nominated

== Sequel ==
According to actor JM de Guzman who played Anthony Lagdameo in the film, the director is already writing the script for the sequel. This was also confirmed by Panganiban that the film is currently in-development.

The director of the film (Jadaone) will return as the writer and director, stating that she would agree to work on a sequel, but “in the right conditions.”
