= Basta Sports =

- Genre: Sports
- Created by: ABS-CBN Foundation
- Presented by: Atom Araullo; Ketchup Eusebio
- Country of origin: Philippines
- Original language: Filipino

Production
- Running time: 30 minutes

Original release
- Network: ABS-CBN
- Release: September 16 – December 16, 2006

Basta Sports is a Philippine informative sports program created by the ABS-CBN Foundation (formerly ABS-CBN Lingkod Kapamilya Foundation) and airs weekly on ABS-CBN. It features different sports and sports icons.

The show hosted by Atom Araullo and Ketchup Eusebio, Basta Sports is a unique show about games and sports for today's youth. Produced by ABS-CBN Foundation, the show presents a particular sports' history, its mechanics and also teaches kids how to be active and healthy through participation in said sports. It is directed by Rene Guidote.

== See also ==
- List of programs previously aired by ABS-CBN
