= Love or Money =

2021 Philippine romantic comedy film

- Official release poster
- Directed by: Mae Cruz-Alviar
- Written by: Crystal Hazel San Miguel
- Produced by: John Leo Garcia; Carmi Raymundo
- Starring: Coco Martin; Angelica Panganiban
- Cinematography: Noel Teehankee
- Edited by: Marya Ignacio
- Music by: Francis Concio
- Production companies: Star Cinema; CCM Film Productions
- Distributed by: CineExpress
- Release date: March 12, 2021
- Running time: 116 minutes
- Country: Philippines
- Language: Filipino

Love or Money is a 2021 Philippine romantic comedy film starring Coco Martin and Angelica Panganiban, directed by Mae Cruz-Alviar, produced by Star Cinema. The film was released on March 12, 2021, on KTX, iWantTFC, TFC IPTV PPV and on Sky Cable PPV. It was supposed to be available on Cignal PPV, but was discontinued due to the extension availability of Hello Stranger: The Movie. This film is currently available on Netflix since May 15, 2021.

The film was supposed to be released on April 11, 2020 (Black Saturday) as an entry to the supposed 2020 Metro Manila Summer Film Festival, however the event was cancelled due to the COVID-19 pandemic in the Philippines.

== Synopsis ==
Set in Dubai, Leon is a humble and diligent man who works on various odd jobs to support himself and send money back home to his father and siblings while Angel is a driven entrepreneur and owner of an event company who lives a double life and also a mistress of a Spanish billionaire. Leon and Angel had a brief encounter at a restaurant. Years later, the two meet again and Leo pursues Angel. Despite initial rejection, their relationship develops into a romance. However, Angel's ambition of becoming rich is preventing her from having a lasting relationship.

== Cast ==
=== Main Cast ===
- Coco Martin as Leon Antonio
- Angelica Panganiban as Angel Dela Cerna

=== Supporting Cast ===
- Gelli de Bellen as Tita Faye
- Ketchup Eusebio as Juniver
- Cai Cortez as Cat
- Matet de Leon as Mima
- Dante Rivero as Tatay Perts
- Teresa Loyzaga as Tita Annette
- Pinky Amador as Tita Lorena
- Jeremiah Lisbo as Patrick
- Hanz Correa as Jhim
- Ria Atayde as Agnes Antonio
- RK Bagatsing as Angel's Ex Boyfriend
- Norm McLeod as Enrique
