= White Lady (film) =

- DVD cover
- Directed by: Jeff Tan
- Written by: Joel Rufino A. Nuñez; Don Michael Perez
- Produced by: Lily Y. Monteverde; Roselle Monteverde-Teo
- Starring: Pauleen Luna; JC De Vera; Boots Anson-Roa; Jason Abalos; Iwa Moto; Gian Carlos; Franzen Fajardo; Ketchup Eusebio; Glaiza de Castro; Katarina Perez; Angelica Panganiban
- Cinematography: Tim Jimenez
- Edited by: Miren Fabregas; Jay Halili
- Music by: Von De Guzman
- Production company: Regal Films
- Release date: July 19, 2006
- Running time: 107 minutes
- Country: Philippines
- Languages: Filipino; English; Hiligaynon

White Lady is a 2006 Filipino supernatural horror film directed by Jeff Tan. It is Tan's first feature-length film as he worked mostly on music videos.

== Plot ==
Two best friends from Iloilo, Pearl and Jonathan, arrive in Manila to study at an Arts Academy. Jonathan himself secretly harbors romantic feelings for Pearl. Upon enrollment, a clique of students led by Mimi and her right-hand person Eva, takes an interest in them. Mimi is a pretty, rich, and popular girl who gets her way by bullying others. The clique also consists of basketball jock Joshua, film and photography major Jowee, and delinquent band frontman Hector.

Mimi takes Pearl and Jonathan into her fold, befriending them in exchange for academic favors from the bright and studious Pearl. However, Pearl rebuffs the clique after realizing their deceptions, while Jonathan joins a prominent fraternity. Soon after, Pearl and Jonathan becomes estranged from each other.

One night, Pearl experiences paranormal occurrences on campus and has visions of a woman in white singing a folk lullaby. She and Jonathan learn from others about the story of a White Lady rumored to frequent the school grounds. Jonathan catches up with Pepo, who is building a new storage shed; Pepo reveals that the original storage shed burned down and adds of seeing a vision of the said woman at the shed's site. The next day, Pearl meets and befriends Tasya, a kindhearted Guimaras-born elderly woman residing in a house inside campus. Tasya tells the story of her granddaughter Christina, a simple girl who was reportedly driven into hiding by Mimi's pompousness. Pearl immediately feels an affinity towards Christina since both girls have been receiving Mimi's scorn. Throughout the film, Tasya talks with Christina, whose face is not shown until the climax.

The haunting worsens when Pearl lands the highly coveted lead role in a school play, arousing Mimi's jealousy and ire as she wanted the part for herself. In another circumstance, a burgeoning relationship begins to kindle between Pearl and Robbie, the rich, athletic, and most popular guy in school, whom Mimi also desires.

Flashbacks show Christina's story. Robbie befriends her after rescuing her from Mimi's gang. The two begin a relationship that his father opposes and forces them to separate and have Robbie choose Mimi. Soon after, Mimi's friends begin to torment her frequently. Christina shuns Robbie after having her way by his and the gang's actions. After the gang imprisons her in a storage shed, Mimi drugs a janitor to silence him and Robbie, under her influence, murders Christina by setting the shed on fire.

In a series of intense ghostly appearances, the White Lady manifests herself to the clique, letting them experience her wrath. Each clique member is either killed or left mutilated out of trauma.

Pearl receives news during a Halloween feast that her mother has leukemia and reveals to Robbie that she is returning to Iloilo. Robbie grows obsessed and disoriented after seeing Christina's vision on his cellphone. Pearl escapes to a gypsy tent, wherein she encounters a vision that relives Christina's final moments. From here, she learns of Robbie's crime and shuns Robbie.

Robbie captures Pearl and drags her to the storage shed. Jonathan witnesses this and intervenes, only to be subdued by Robbie. To try and silence them, Robbie sets the shed on fire and flees the scene on a motorcycle. The White Lady, now revealed to be Christina, appears and causes him to crash. He runs to a carillon wherein bells play the lullaby, and Christina causes Robbie to fall to his death. Pearl and Jonathan manage to survive and escape the shed fire unharmed due to Christina's soul diverting the flames. Later on, Christina walks to a light in an empty field, presumably the gate of Heaven.

Sometime later, Pearl returns to Iloilo and visits Tasya, wherein the former reveals that her mother has died. As Tasya reveals that she sees Christina's soul departing for the afterlife in peace, Pearl states that they vow to care for each other despite their losses. While the two comfort each other, Christina's voice sings her lullaby.

== Cast ==
=== Main characters ===
- Boots Anson-Roa as Lola Tasya, Christina's grandmother, who hails from Guimaras. Tasya is a kind and loving woman who cares about her granddaughter. She has visions of Christina in scenes involving her.
- Angelica Panganiban as Christina/White Lady, a kind and intelligent girl from Western Visayas who becomes the titular character as part of her revenge quest following her murder in the hands of a clique that belittled her
- Pauleen Luna as Pearl, a Voice Major student from Iloilo
- JC de Vera as Robbie, a popular student who becomes Pearl's boyfriend. He is also revealed to be the former boyfriend of Christina and eventually, her murderer.
- Gian Carlos as Jonathan, a close friend of Pearl who also hails from Iloilo

=== The Clique ===
- Iwa Moto as Mimi, the leader of the clique who is notorious for bullying others. She is killed by shattered mirror shards in a dressing room during a concert's premiere.
- Ketchup Eusebio as Hector, a member of the clique who is a known band frontman. He is the first member to be killed following his fall to a pit wherein he is suffocated by rats when he encounters the titular character dissolving to rodents
- Jason Abalos as Joshua, another member of the clique. He falls from Mimi's bedroom window and becomes amputated after a possessed doll chases him. His fate is left unknown.
- Katarina Perez as Eva, Mimi's right-hand person and the second-in-command of the clique. She is killed after the entity severs her arm with broken glass as she attempts to escape a painting studio.
- Glaiza de Castro as Jowee, a photography major student and another member of the clique. She becomes hyperventilated after the titular character appears in a darkroom and blinds her with flashes but survives.

=== Other characters ===
- Franzen Fajardo as Kuya Pepo
- Nanding Josef as Mang Jani
- Malou Crisologo as Professor Barredo
- Ricci Chan as Professor Alfredo
- Emil Sandoval as Robert Sr.
- Minnie Aguilar as Ate Teri

== Production ==
Principal photography of the film was done within the University of the Philippines Los Baños campus.

== See also ==
- List of ghost films
