= Citizen Jake =

- Theatrical release poster
- Directed by: Mike de Leon
- Written by: Mike de Leon; Noel Pascual; Atom Araullo
- Produced by: Mike de Leon
- Starring: Atom Araullo; Cherie Gil; Gabby Eigenmann; Adrian Alandy; Nonie Buencamino; Max Collins; Teroy Guzman; Lou Veloso; Richard Quan; Dina Bonnevie
- Cinematography: Dix Buhay
- Edited by: Tom Estrera III; Gerone Centeno
- Music by: Nonong Buencamino
- Production company: Cinema Artists Philippines
- Distributed by: Solar Pictures
- Release date: May 23, 2018
- Country: Philippines
- Language: Filipino

Citizen Jake is a 2018 Philippine crime drama film produced and directed by Mike de Leon in his final directional feature film before his death in 2025. Combining elements of film noir and metacinema, it features real-life journalist Atom Araullo (who also co-wrote the screenplay) in a fictional role as a former journalist who criticizes politicians through his writing.

It was de Leon's first film after nearly two decades of hiatus from filmmaking. After special screening was held on March 10, 2018, at the UP Cine Adarna, it was publicly released on March 23 in the Philippines and made its international premiere in South Korea during the 23rd Busan International Film Festival.

== Plot ==
When journalist Jake Herrera (real-life journalist Atom Araullo, in his film debut) investigates the murder of a student, he is forced to confront the sins of his own family - especially as his father, (Teroy Guzman) was a loyal Marcos crony who still has the power to ruin lives and manipulate public perceptions.

== Cast ==
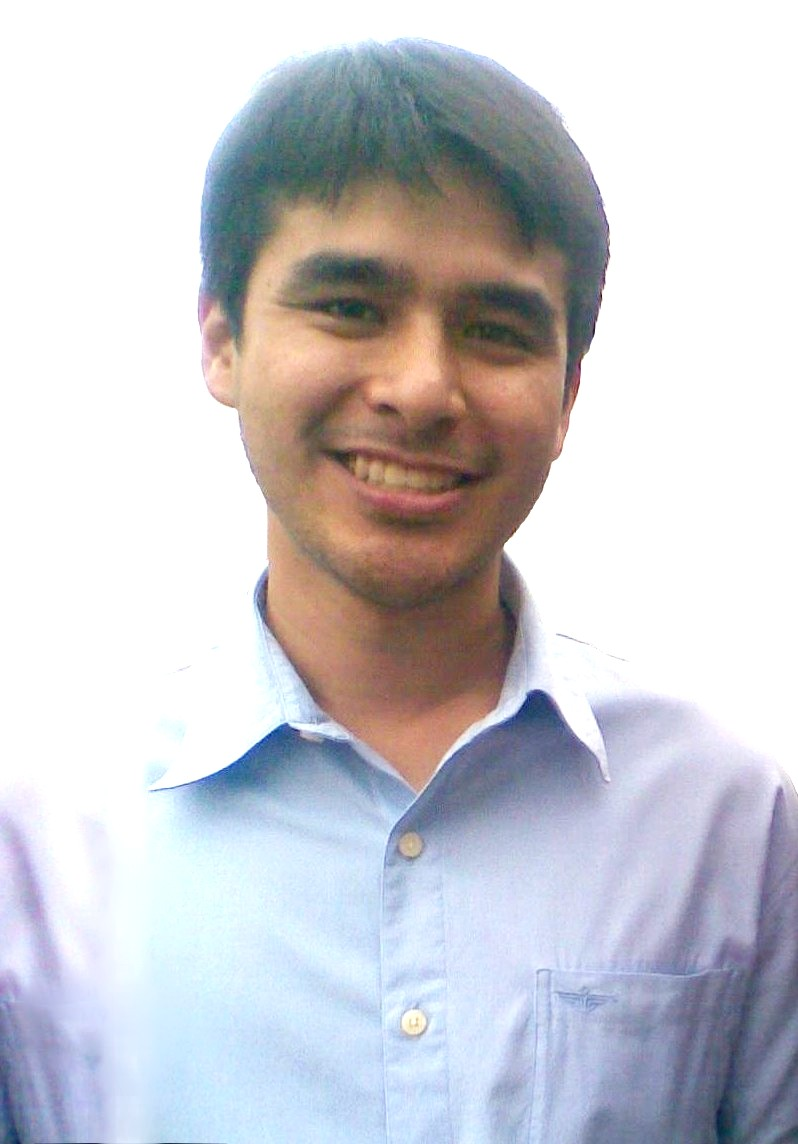
Atom Araullo portrays Jake Herrera.

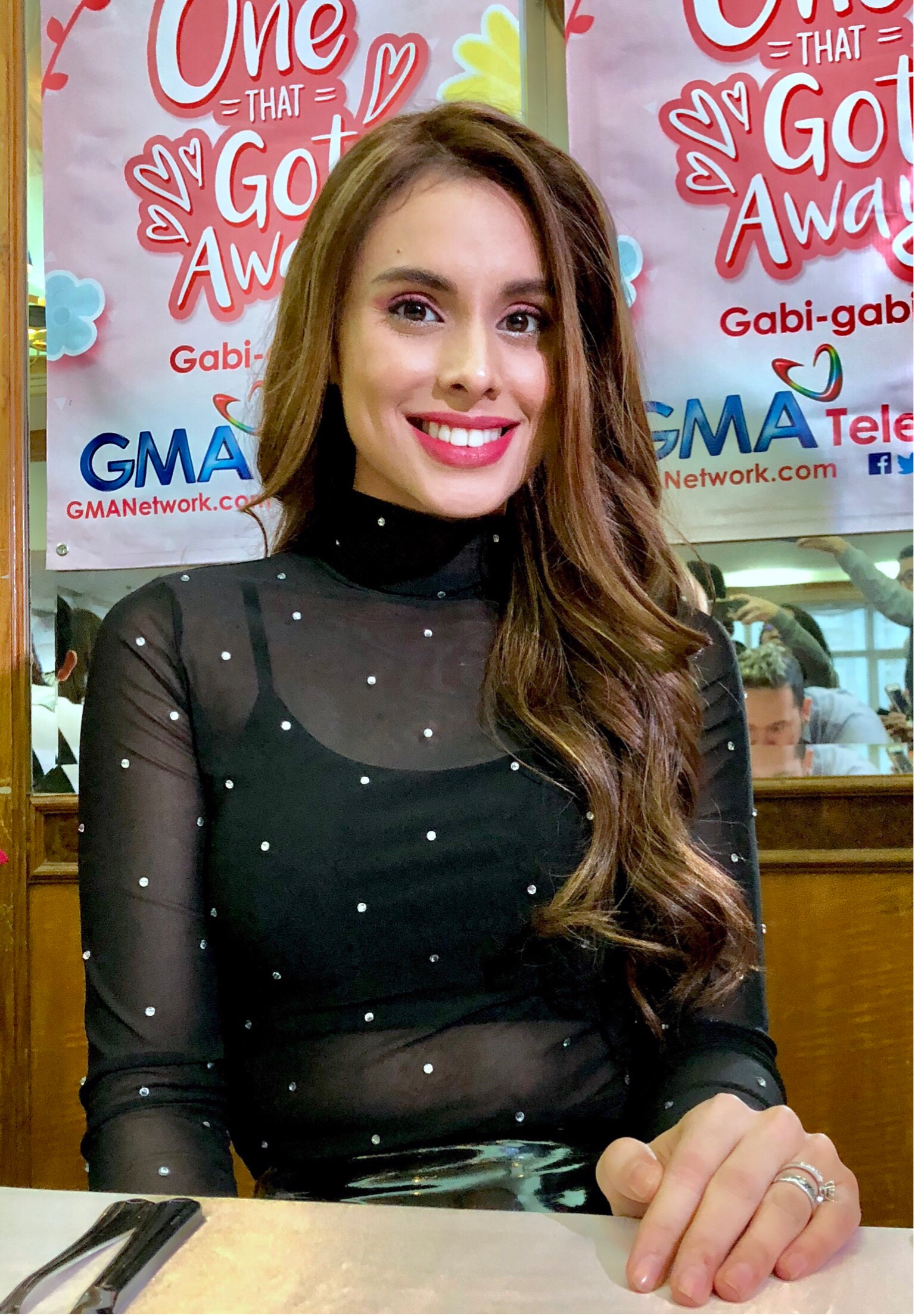
Max Collins portrays Mandy.

- Atom Araullo as Jacobo "Jake" Herrera Jr.

The film's main protagonist, a journalist, and blogger, who is in conflict with his political family. The film marks Araullo's acting debut. Araullo describes Herrera as a product of circumstances. In an interview, Araullo disagreed with the perception that he could easily portray the character since he is a journalist himself in real life. He said that Herrera is a different character but that he identifies with Herrera's doggedness and "faith in the power of stories". Herrera is characterized as an intelligent person with a deep social conscience.

- Teroy Guzman as Jacobo Herrera Sr.

A Marcos crony turned corrupt senator who is Jake's father.

- Gabby Eigenmann as Roxie Herrera

Jake Herrera's older brother who is a member of the House of Representatives.

- Adrian Alandy as Jonie

Jake Herrera's childhood friend and also one of the "Pony Boys" of Baguio.

- Max Collins as Mandy

An English schoolteacher and Jake's girlfriend.

The rest of the film's cast consists of Cherie Gil, Lou Veloso, Nonie Buencamino, Anna Luna, Allan Paule, Richard Quan, Victor Neri, Ruby Ruiz, Nanding Josef and Dina Bonnevie.

== Production ==
=== Development ===
Citizen Jake was directed by Mike de Leon. De Leon is making his first film in the 21st century having directed the 1999 classic, Bayaning 3rd World. De Leon along with Atom Araullo and Noel Pascual wrote the script for the film. The trio met regularly to work on the film as early as November 2016.

Director Mike de Leon said that the title of Citizen Jake is a reference to "the world of citizen journalists, social media and politics" and described the film as a "hybrid film of sorts". The film, which he described as "personal", is meant as a tribute to the now defunct LVN Studios which was run by his grandmother and father. He also cites his worry about the recent political gains of the Marcos family as another reason and says that President Rodrigo Duterte believes that the regime of President Ferdinand Marcos was not bad at all. De Leon believed that Duterte was aiming to "outdo the dead dictator in his sociopathic quest for absolute power".

=== Principal photography ===
It was projected that the film's production team would be set up by Christmas of 2016 and it was planned that the principal photography was to start by mid-March to early-April 2017. Principal photography began on March 17, 2017, with some scenes shot in Baguio. Filming was also made at the director's house in Baguio which was also a filming location of the film, Kung Mangarap Ka’t Magising which starred Christopher de Leon.

The cinematographer of the film was Dix Buhay while Lorna Sanchez and Martin Mayuga served as assistant director and production manager, respectively.

By July 2017, the principal photography of Citizen Jake has been finished. Post-production work was briefly stopped in November 2017 but was later continued.

== Release ==
=== Marketing ===
A teaser for Citizen Jake was released in June 2017.

=== Special screening ===
On January 5, 2018, it was announced that Citizen Jake will be having a special screening on March 10, 2018, in Cine Adarna at the University of the Philippines Diliman.

=== Theatrical release ===
The film was initially planned to be submitted as an entry of the 2017 Metro Manila Film Festival. It was submitted as a script to the film festival's organizers but was not selected as one of the first four official entries. It was announced that the film will be later submitted when its final state in a bid to be among the final four entries.

However, in October 2017, the film's director, Mike de Leon announced that the film will not be entered to the film festival and alleges the organizers of corruption, particularly the selection process. He criticized the organizers of the film festival "that purports to make children happy during the holiday season, a euphemism for profit and greed."

Citizen Jake was slated for theatrical release on May 23, 2018, under Solar Pictures.

== See also ==
- List of films about martial law in the Philippines
- Martial law in the Philippines under Ferdinand Marcos
