= Franzen Fajardo =

Filipino actor, TV host, and entrepreneur

- Born: Franzen Macaraig Fajardo; Sampaloc, Manila, Philippines
- Occupations: Actor; TV host; entrepreneur
- Years active: 2005–2012

Franzen Macaraig Fajardo is a Filipino actor, TV host, and former reality show contestant best known for his stint on the first season of Pinoy Big Brother. After appearing in a number of TV shows and films, he stepped back from showbiz and later pursued business ventures abroad.

== Background and personal life ==
Fajardo grew up in a lower-income family and began working in his youth to help support his household, including being a salesman prior to his media exposure.

Fajardo's marriage to his wife Love Joy, was the subject of media coverage in 2007 when he filed a petition for legal separation. In an interview, Fajardo cited ongoing marital problems and alleged mistreatment as grounds for the separation. He also claimed instances of verbal and physical conflict in the relationship, which he described as having led to their estrangement.

In 2020, it was reported that Fajardo was running a business in Singapore.

== Pinoy Big Brother ==
Fajardo was a contestant on the first season of Pinoy Big Brother, which aired in late 2005.

Fajardo was popular with Filipino audiences because of his comedic nature. He was considered the underdog housemate, especially during the first month inside the house, and became known for habitually picking his nose and playing strip games with Jason inside the House. As the series continued, Fajardo violated numerous house rules, but despite automatic nominations, the popular vote kept him in the House. His mouthing of words (lip-synching) became the last straw. After much deliberation, Endemol decided on Day 86 (November 15, 2005) that Fajardo should be evicted. Fellow contestant Cassandra Ponti offered to voluntarily leave the house in exchange for Fajardo's retention; however, Big Brother instead decided to put his fate to a public vote. The following day, voting was halted and Fajardo's automatic eviction was finalized after he committed another rule violation.

In the years following his appearance on Pinoy Big Brother, Fajardo appeared in a number of sitcoms and comedy shows, before deciding not to pursue a career in the media.

== Filmography ==
=== Film ===
- D'Lucky Ones! (2006)
- White Lady (2006)

=== Television ===
- Pinoy Big Brother (2005)
- Magandang Umaga, Pilipinas (2005–2006)
- Trip na Trip (2006)
- Komiks: Inday Bote (2006)
- Love Spell Presents: Wanted: Mr. Perfect (2006)
- Maria Flordeluna (2007)
- Only You (2009)
- May Bukas Pa (2009)
- Precious Hearts Romances Presents: Ang Lalaking Nagmahal Sa Akin (2009)
- Maalaala Mo Kaya: Kurtina (2012)
