= Every Breath U Take =

- Theatrical movie poster
- Directed by: Mae Czarina Cruz
- Screenplay by: Mel Mendoza-del Rosario; Zig Marasigan; Anj Pessumal; Additional screenplay: Generiza F. Reyes; Ays de Guzman
- Story by: Mel Mendoza-del Rosario; Zig Marasigan
- Produced by: Marizel Samson-Martinez (supervising)
- Starring: Piolo Pascual; Angelica Panganiban
- Cinematography: Manuel Teehankee
- Edited by: Marya Ignacio
- Music by: Teresa Barrozo
- Production company: ABS-CBN Film Productions, Inc.
- Distributed by: Star Cinema
- Release date: May 16, 2012
- Running time: 105 minutes
- Country: Philippines
- Languages: Tagalog; English
- Box office: ₱49.8 million

Every Breath You Take (marketed as Every Breath U Take) is 2012 Filipino romantic comedy film directed by Mae Czarina Cruz and starring Piolo Pascual and Angelica Panganiban. Produced by Star Cinema, the film was theatrically released on May 16, 2012.

== Synopsis ==
Marjorie "Majoy" is a naive young woman who is looking and praying for one true love while Leo is a career-driven womanizer who does not believe in love. The two meet on Valentine's day where romance starts to blossom between them and Leo is starting to question his own beliefs after meeting Major.

== Cast ==
- Piolo Pascual as Leo Dimalanta
- Angelica Panganiban as Marjorie "Majoy" Marasigan
- Nova Villa as Lola Pilar
- Ryan Eigenmann as Mario
- Smokey Manoloto as King
- Carlos Agassi as Ace
- Joross Gamboa as Jack
- Ketchup Eusebio as Chikoy
- Janus Del Prado as Boy
- Wendy Valdez as Queenie/Dianne
- Regine Angeles as Leila
- Cacai Bautista as Mitch
- Frenchie Dy as Abbie
- Ryan Bang as Ji-Sun
- Lito Legaspi as Leo's dad
- Dominic Ochoa as Chief/Leo's older brother
- Freddie Webb as Lolo Pepe
- Marnie Lapus as Mrs. Tan
- Roden Araneta as Waiter
- Art Mendoza as Senior Vice President
- Jojit Lorenzo as Police Officer
- JM De Guzman as Carwash Boy

== Production ==
=== Development ===
The film was announced back in May 2011, that a romantic-comedy film was to be produced and released by Star Cinema that will star Piolo Pascual and supposedly Kim Chiu. But Chiu was replaced by Angelica Panganiban as Piolo's leading lady. The principal photography of the film started in June 2011 with the tentative title of Postcards from Heaven and was later changed its title to Every Breath U Take. The film was intended to release on April 4, 2012, but was moved to May 16, 2012.

=== Promotion ===
The cinema trailer was released online via the official YouTube account of Star Cinema on April 4, 2012.

=== Music ===
The film's official soundtrack is "Every Breath You Take" originally sung by The Police and is covered for the film by Piolo Pascual.

== Release ==
=== Critical response ===
The film was Graded B by the Cinema Evaluation Board and rated PG-13 by the Movie and Television Review and Classification Board. Critics praised the overall cast performances, some called the film's story paper-thin.

=== Box office ===
The film grossed ₱10 million on its opening day. As of May 27. 2012 it already earned ₱42,800,000.00 million pesos.

=== Trivia ===
A handsome playboy who doesn't believe in love begins to question his outlook when he meets a young woman who has been praying to find her one true love. reads from ClickTheCity.com.
