= Rubi (Philippine TV series) =

- Title card
- Genre: Drama; Romance; Telenovela
- Created by: ABS-CBN Studios; Yolanda Vargas Dulché
- Based on: Rubí by Benjamín Cann and Eric Morales
- Directed by: Erick C. Salud; Don M. Cuaresma; Manny Q. Palo; Darnel Joy R. Villaflor
- Starring: Angelica Panganiban
- Country of origin: Philippines
- Original language: Filipino
- No. of episodes: 127

Production
- Executive producers: Carlo Katigbak; Cory Vidanes; Laurenti Dyogi; Roldeo T. Endrinal
- Producers: Eileen Angela-Garcia; Julie Anne R. Benitez
- Production companies: Dreamscape Entertainment Television (Philippines); Televisa (Mexico)

Original release
- Network: ABS-CBN
- Release: February 15 – August 13, 2010

Related
- Rubí

Rubi is a 2010 Philippine television drama series broadcast by ABS-CBN. The series is based on a 2004 Mexican TV series of the same title. Directed by Erick C. Salud, Don M. Cuaresma, Manny Q. Palo and Darnel Joy R. Villaflor, it stars Angelica Panganiban, Jake Cuenca, Shaina Magdayao and Diether Ocampo. It aired on the network's Primetime Bida line up and worldwide on TFC from February 15 to August 13, 2010, replacing Pinoy Big Brother: Double Up and was replaced by Precious Hearts Romances Presents: Kristine.

The main difference of this teleserye to others is that the lead character, Rubi, is an anti-heroine dubbed as "Ang Bidang-Kontrabida" (The Villainous Protagonist). She is vain, scheming and manipulative but still has heart, but chose not to listen to her conscience to reach her high ambitions.

== Plot ==
=== Beginning ===
Vivian (Cherry Pie Picache) gives birth to her daughter while she is still in prison because of fraud charges, thus, leaving her no other choice but to put her newly born daughter for adoption. Immediately after her release, she goes in search for the child. And to her surprise, she learns that her daughter is actually under the care of the child's biological father, Arturo (Gardo Versoza) and his new wife Sylvanna (Cherie Gil). Insistent to get her daughter back, Vivian relentlessly kidnaps her. And in line with her plan of starting a new life, she brings her daughter far away to the city and she changes their names. Vivian is now Rosanna and her daughter is named Rubi (Xyriel Manabat). Vivian's possessive lover Danilo (Alan Paule) located them. She conned him while inside prison to help her with her parole. After getting her parole, she escapes from him, leaving him looking like an idiot. He now wants to take revenge on Rosanna and her family. Rubi (Khaycee Aboloc) escapes but became lost in the city. In order to survive, she knocks on car windows to ask for alms. For months, she spent time alone in the busy streets, until her unexpected reunion with her mother who has been searching for her. On the other hand, since Sylvanna is still longing for their lost daughter, which is now Rubi, she then decides to adopt a child named Maribel (Shaina Magdayao). But she encounters a terrible car accident while driving with her foster father, causing permanent damage to her left leg.

=== Years pass ===
Though they lack the cash, Rubi (Angelica Panganiban) all grown up continuously lives in luxury. Apparently, her mother insistently spoils her with extravagance to make up for their uncalled for separation before. Rubi grew up to become a beautiful young woman and she is not afraid to flaunt her looks. She has an ambition of marrying a wealthy man to get out of the slums that they live in and for her to finally afford all her luxuries. Even though she knows that she could not practically afford it, Rosanna strives hard to send Rubi in a prestigious private school. On their way to inquire about admissions, Rubi accidentally comes across Maribel. She learns that Maribel has an inferiority complex because of her disability and upon realizing that the young lady is filthy rich, Rubi instantly decides to befriend the disabled young lady and defends her from her bullies. Maribel invites Rubi over to her house so that she could meet her parents. And immediately, the charming young lady gains the couple's favor. And since she had finally earned Maribel's trust, Rubi gets a peep in her new friend's life. Maribel gladly introduces Hector (Diether Ocampo), her long-time chat-mate, to her. Aside from that, the young lady also discloses the fact that she is in fact an adopted daughter. Through Maribel and her family, Rubi gets a taste of the good life. Maribel showers her with nice clothes, shoes, gadgets. She also takes her to exotic trips and parties, but behind the warm smiles of Rubi, she harbors deep envy of Maribel's social status.

=== Things become more complicated ===
Maribel tells Rubi that her long time chat mate, Hector will be coming for them to meet face to face. Maribel shy about meeting Hector, Rubi sets Maribel up on a date with Hector and despite her disability the two immediately fell in love.

Hector then introduces his best friend Alejandro who soon falls in love with Rubi. Thinking Alejandro was rich, Rubi flirts with him eventually developing feelings for him. But upon discovering that Alejandro is a scholar by Hector's family and is not actually rich, she slowly became cold to Alejandro. However, she could not deny that she was in love with him, and finally accepted it.

Sylvanna and Arturo learn that Rubi is their long-lost adopted child, they asked her to live with them. Reaching her goal of living luxury as Maribel's sister, Rubi still longed for her mother Rosanna. After a misunderstanding caused a fight between Maribel and Rubi, they all realized that Rubi was better off living back with Rosanna. Sylvanna and Arturo offered her allowance as a support, but Rubi demanded more, which escalated into a fight that ended with her in jail. This cemented Rubi's vow to take revenge and take Maribel's life which she believed should be hers.

Hurtfully forcing herself to forget Alejandro, Rubi seduces Hector unbeknownst to Maribel. The night before Hector and Maribel's wedding, the two spent the night together. Hector completely losing judgment, chose Rubi instead of his fiancé Maribel, abandoning her at their wedding and marrying Rubi instead. Upon realizing the truth that they are in love with one woman, Alejandro and Hector's friendship completely broken down. Alejandro and Maribel felt betrayed by the actions of their best friends. Chaos also ensued at the families of Hector and Maribel because of what they have done.

Danilo also revealed her mother's and Arturo's relationship which destroyed Maribel's family. Sylvanna was furious at Rubi but Rubi now has the wealth to use against her. Rubi, however, lost her right to Arturo's wealth since Sylvanna cut off Arturo.

In the midst of the chaos, Alejandro and Maribel left with each other, slowly becomes attracted to each other. Despite falling in love with Maribel, Alejandro still harbors feelings for Rubi.

On the other hand, Rubi realizes that she is not completely happy with being rich. She hates the fact that Alejandro is dating Maribel and wants him for herself. Hector becomes insecure about his wife especially when she's with Alejandro during social and charity functions which she uses to flirt with him, which exposes Hector's violent side. Rubi continues her scheming to get more money from Hector's family since she knows her husband is blindly in love with her and knows nothing about her secret plans. Her in-laws try to expose her but always one step ahead, Rubi blackmailed her father-in-law about his affair whom he has a family with. She accidentally reveals it later and causing a rift between Hector's parents. One of her plans against Maribel's family backfired on her and it killed her mother. Instead of changing her ways because of the tragedy, Rubi is more determined than ever to get all that she wants. She framed Sylvanna for the tragedy and sent her to prison. She is also starting showing her true colors to her husband. Without no knowledge of how to run a business, she made a fashion business with her cohort, Loretto to destroy Maribel's business.

More chaos ensues as she cause trouble to her sister Cristina's relationship. Disliking her boyfriend Cayetano for being only employed as Maribel's family driver, she criticizes and mocks him, even framing him with theft put him in jail. She did not succeed and Cayetano was sent free but this caused a rift between Rubi and her sister.

While Maribel is still dating Alejandro, she catches Rubi and Alejandro kissing. Maribel is devastated while Rubi is delighted thinking Alejandro is still in love with her. Alejandro is torn between Maribel and Rubi. Alejandro and Rubi meet one night and they became intimate. Maribel discovering what happened, decided to go away. Rubi soon becomes pregnant and questions the possibility that it could be Alejandro's baby instead of Hector's. Still unsure, Rubi tells Hector that the baby is his. Meanwhile, Alejandro goes to Maribel's house hoping that Maribel will forgive him, where he finds out that Maribel has left for Europe but still she came back and she is willing to forgive him. Also, she does not want Rubi to see that she is affected of what happened.

Hector finds the evidence of the one night Rubi and Alejandro had sex and confronts Rubi upon her return home. They get into a heated argument and Hector punches her pregnant stomach and she has a miscarriage. After some tests, it was revealed that Hector killed his own baby. Because of these incidents, Hector completely lost his mind.

=== Finale ===
After she recovered, Rubi tried to get back to Hector to talk to him and explain her version of the story. Little did she know that Hector was now deranged. Hector takes Rubi to their unfinished, would-be home still under construction and physically abuses her. Hector then calls Alejandro and pretends that he has become nice, but it was an act so he could kill him. Alejandro arrives and Rubi tries to stop Hector but he accidentally pushes Rubi off the edge of the building. Rubi holds on for dear life while Hector tries to save her but fails to lift Rubi up and both of them fall on the pavement below. Hector dies on the spot while Rubi is rushed to the hospital afterwards. She now realizes that she already had everything; her family, friends, the man that truly loved her, but she deemed it all worthless just for her blind ambitions. Rubi wakes up with a huge scar on her face and her right leg has been amputated. Because of a rare skin condition, the scar would not heal and it would remain permanent. The beauty she uses to deceive everyone is now gone. She also agrees to Maribel and Alejandro's marriage and stays friends with them, and lives with her aunt and her niece. Learning her lesson, she visits her mother's grave and tells her that even though she lost everything, she now realizes she is free from her greed and envy and can finally start being happy. In the end, she asks her mother that if ever she sees Hector in heaven, to tell Hector that Rubi loves him.

== Cast and characters ==
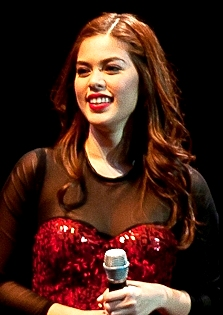
Shaina Magdayao portrays Maribel dela Fuente-Cardenas.

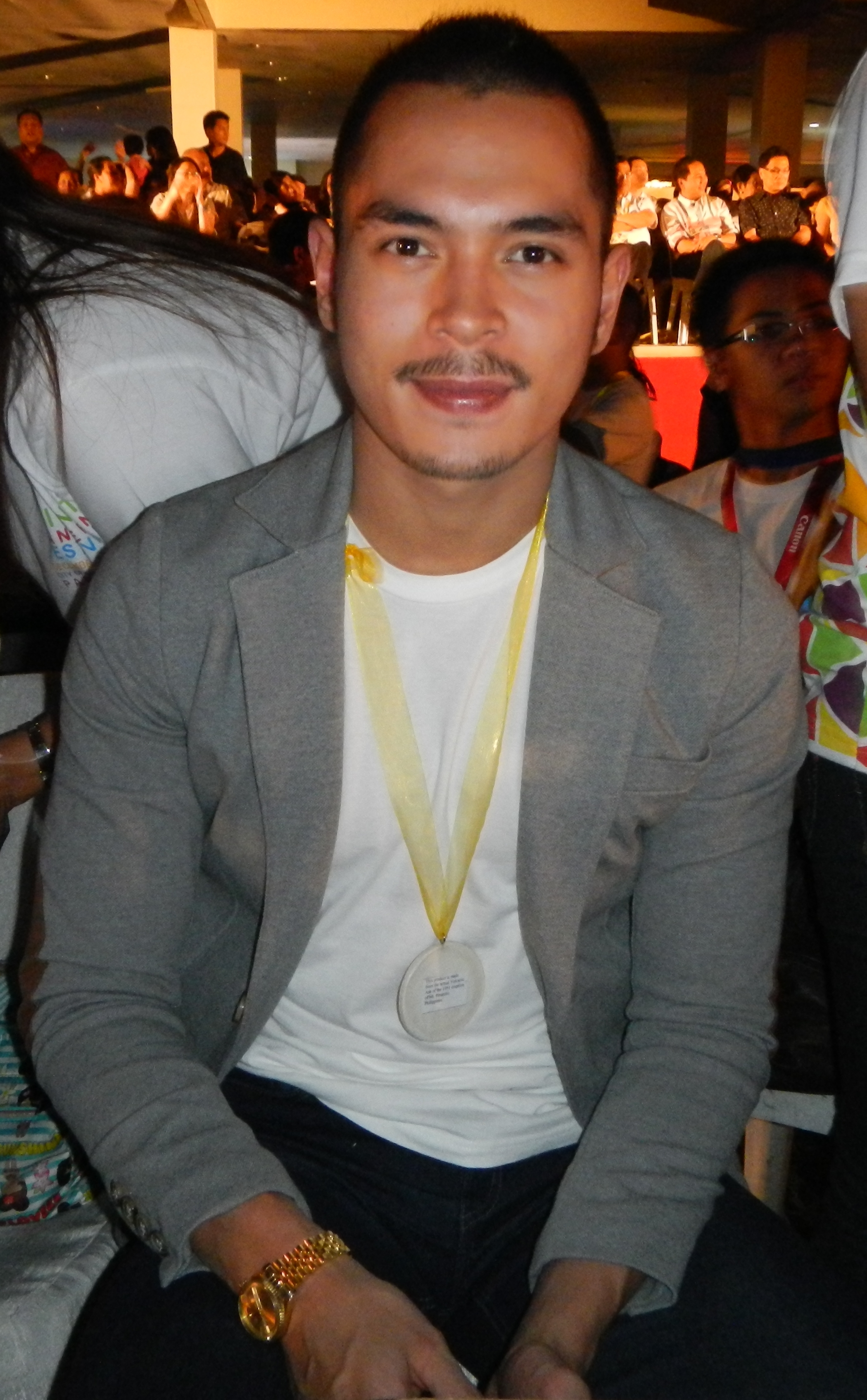
Jake Cuenca portrays Alejandro Cardenas.

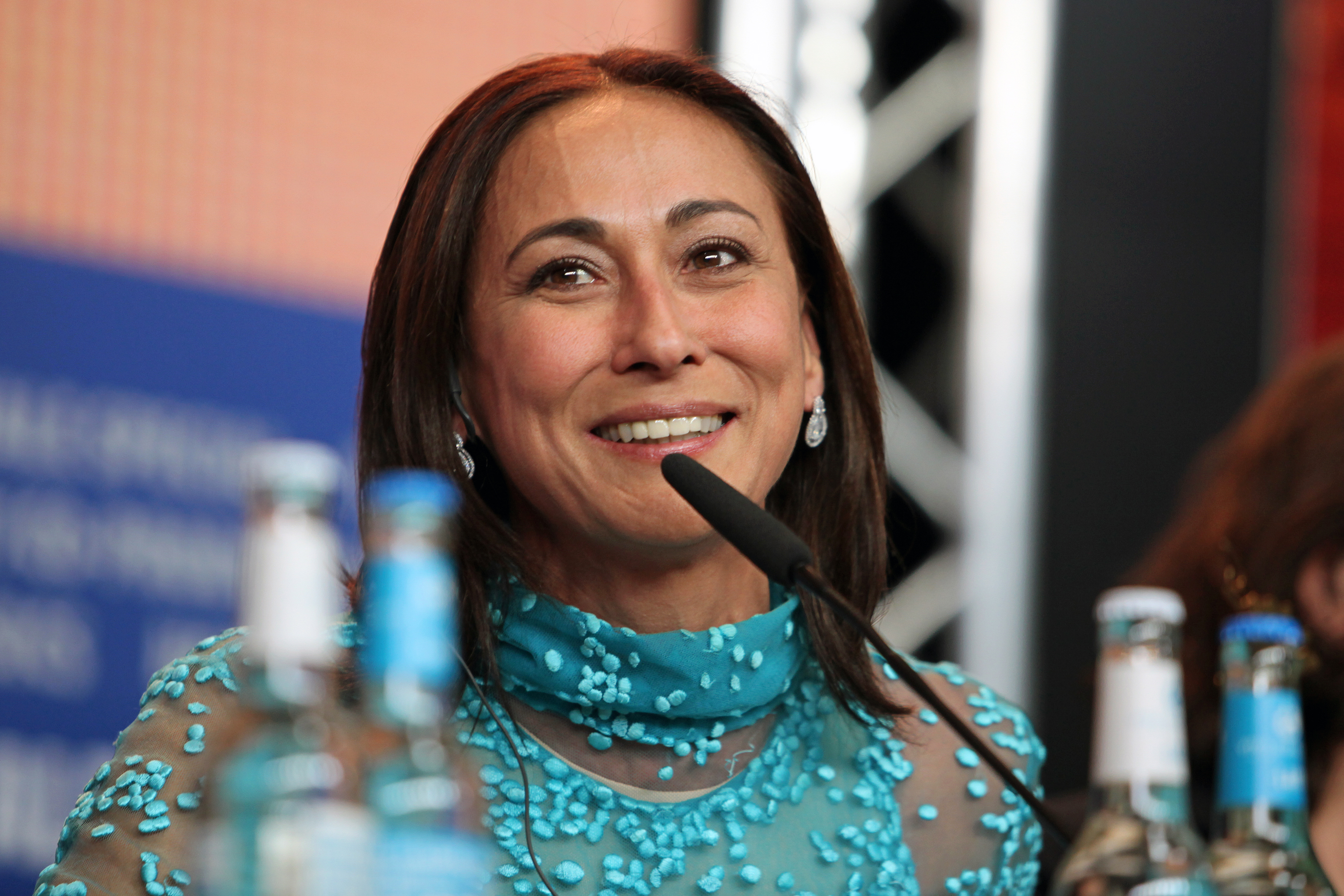
Cherie Gil portrays Sylvana Velasco-dela Fuente.

=== Main cast ===
- Angelica Panganiban as Rubi Perez-Ferrer / Theresa Rodrigo-Dela Fuente
- Jake Cuenca as Alejandro Cardenas
- Shaina Magdayao as Maribel dela Fuente-Cardenas
- Diether Ocampo as Hector Ferrer†

=== Supporting cast ===
- Cherry Pie Picache as Vivian Rodrigo / Rosanna "Rose" Perez† – Rubi's mother
- Gardo Versoza as Arturo dela Fuente – Rubi's father.
- Allan Paule as Danilo Capili† – a patrol officer
- Kaye Abad as Princess Rodrigo / Cristina Perez – Rosanna's younger sister and Rubi's aunt.
- Wowie de Guzman as Cayetano – the Dela Fuente family's driver.
- Susan Africa as Yaya Pancha – trusted friend and the housekeeper of the Dela Fuente family.
- Dante Rivero as Dr. Jose Bermudez – Hector's uncle who's a neurosurgeon.
- Juan Rodrigo as Genaro Ferrer – Hector's father.
- Rey "PJ" Abellana as Ignacio Cardenas – Alejandro's father
- Bing Loyzaga as Carla Cardenas – Alejandro's mother.
- Cherie Gil as Sylvana Velasco-dela Fuente – Arturo's wife.
- Coney Reyes as Elisa Bermudez-Ferrer – Hector's mother.
- Mel Martinez as Loretto Valiente – Rubi's friend.

=== Extended cast ===
- Eva Darren as Mameng – a storekeeper in Rubi's neighborhood
- Melissa Mendez as Elena Navarro – a woman Hector's father is having an affair with.
- Mel Martinez as Lorreto Valiente – Rubi's fashion design teacher, and best friend.
- James Blanco as Marco – another medical doctor intern and is Alejandro's friend who courts Christina.
- Megan Young as Sophia Cardenas – Alejandro's younger sister.
- Xian Lim as Luis N. Ferrer/Luis G. Navarro – Sophia's boyfriend and is Hector's half-brother with his father's mistress.
- Arlene Tolibas as Hilda Marquez – Genaro's friend.
- Marvin Yap as Bibo Reynon – a vagrant in Rubi's neighborhood.
- Irish Fullerton as Nicole – Maribel's schoolmate who bullies her.
- Regine Angeles as Lorena – Nicole's friend who also bullies Maribel but befriends her later on.
- Janus del Prado as Wayne – Rubi's friend
- Mark Africa as Gabriel – Hector's evil co-worker.
- Angel Sy as Nathalie N. Ferrer – Luis' little sister and Genaro's daughter.
- Jon Avila as Saul – the school's most famous varsity basketball player who gets attracted to Rubi and is Nicole's crush.
- Jake Ocampo as Stu – a male model.
- Ryan Ramos as Toni – a doctor.

=== Guest cast ===
- Xyriel Manabat as Rubi/Theresa (5 years old)
- Daniella Amable as Rubi (8 years old)
- KC Aboloc as Young Princess/Cristina

== Production ==
=== Adaptation ===
Rubí is a Mexican telenovela that aired on Televisa in 2004, starring actress Bárbara Mori in the title role, Eduardo Santamarina as Alejandro, Jacqueline Bracamontes as Maribel and Sebastián Rulli as Hector. The series had a total of 115 episodes. The original telenovela was aired on ABS-CBN from January 31 to December 16, 2005, replacing Gata salvaje and dubbed in Tagalog. The original series returned from April 20, 2015, to January 15, 2016, ten years since the airing of Rubí in the Philippines, this time through Telenovela Channel in English audio.

=== Casting ===
Kristine Hermosa and Angelika Dela Cruz were rumoured to be cast as the title character Rubí, but the role eventually went to Angelica Panganiban.

=== Launch ===
Rubi was launched as one of the ABS-CBN's offerings for the 60th Celebration of Filipino Soap Opera ("Ika-60 taon ng Pinoy Soap Opera") during the ABS-CBN Trade Launch for the first quarter of 2010, entitled "Bagong Simula" (New Beginning).

=== Soundtrack ===
The theme song of the original Rubí series is used for the Philippine adaptation, "La Descarada" (lit: "The Shameless One"), performed by Reyli. The song was not translated into a Filipino version and was covered by Anton Alvarez.

In the series Rubi, Rubi and Alejandro's theme song is called "Di Lang Ikaw" (lit: "Not Only You"), performed by Juris Fernandez. It is not translated into an English version.

== Reception ==
Rubi was a hit series throughout its run. According to Kantar Media, its finale episode scored an impressive ratings of 27.8% in nationwide.

== See also ==
- List of programs broadcast by ABS-CBN
- List of ABS-CBN Studios original drama series
- Rubí
- List of Jeepney TV original programming
