= 2014 Palanca Awards =

Philippine literary award

64th Palanca Awards
- Date: September 1, 2014
- Location: The Peninsula Manila, Makati, Philippines

The 64th Don Carlos Palanca Memorial Awards for Literature was held on September 1, 2014, at The Peninsula Manila in Makati to commemorate the memory of Don Carlos Palanca Sr. through an endeavor that would promote education and culture in the country. Gilda Cordero-Fernando was Guest of Honor and Speaker at this year's awarding ceremony.

Alice Tan Gonzales and Rodolfo "Rody" Vera were this year's Palanca Hall of Fame awardees. Gonzales clinched her fifth first prize for “Balay sang Monyeka” under the Short Story [Hiligaynon] category, and Vera clinched his fifth first prize for “Lakambini,” under the Dulang Pampelikula category. The said award is given to writers who have won five first places in any category.

The 2014 winners are divided into four categories:

== English Division ==
=== Short Story ===
- First Prize: Sasha Martinez, "The Auroras"
- Second Prize: Maria Carmen A. Sarmiento, "Zurbaran"
- Third Prize: Sarah Lumba-Tajonera, "Eye Candy"

=== Short Story for Children ===
- First Prize: Jose Carlo O. Sevilla, "Hiro the Rooster and Basha the Hen"
- Second Prize: Kathleen Aton-Osias, "Three Good Things"
- Third Prize: Catherine Rose Torres, "The Ragpicker’s Son"

=== Poetry ===
- First Prize: Ana Maria Katigbak-Lacuesta, "We Won’t Be Tending Gardens"
- Second Prize: Noli Manaig, "Nausea and Other Poems"
- Third Prize: Mikael de Lara Co, This Tender Gravity"

=== Poetry Written for Children ===
- First Prize: No Winner
- Second Prize: Elyrah Salanga-Torralba, "Punny Poems"
- Third Prize: Peter Solis Nery, "Those Colorful Parts"

=== Essay ===
- First Prize: Ma. Nicola Loretto M. Sebastian, "The Salt Price"
- Second Prize: Shakira Andrea C. Sison, "(Insert her Silence Here)"
- Third Prize: Terra J. Daffon, "When One is the Fourth of Ten"

=== One-Act Play ===
- First Prize: Patrick John R. Valencia, "How I Got My Black Leather Boots"
- Second Prize: Karlo Antonio Galay-David, "Killing the Issue"
- Third Prize: Erlinda Mae T. Young, "Photo Finish"

=== Full-Length Play ===
- First Prize: No Winner
- Second Prize: Joachim Emilio B. Antonio, "The Last Filipino"
- Third Prize: No Winner

== Filipino Division ==
=== Maikling Kwento ===
- First Prize: Alvin B. Yapan, "Ang Bugtong ng Manok at Agila"
- Second Prize: Peter Jairron C. Cruz, "Grace"
- Third Prize: Emmanuel T. Barrameda, "Nando"

=== Maikling Kwentong Pambata ===
- First Prize: Eugene Y. Evasco, "Ang Nag-iisa at Natatanging si Onyok"
- Second Prize: No Winner
- Third Prize: No Winner

=== Tula ===
- First Prize: Vijae Orquia Alquisola, "Paglasa sa Pansamantala"
- Second Prize: Enrique S. Villasis, "Marina"
- Third Prize: Jose Marte A. Abueg, "Musikerong Bulag"

=== Tula para sa mga Bata ===
- First Prize: Edgardo B. Maranan, "Tugma at Sukat sa Panahon ng Pagmulat"
- Second Prize: Vijae Orquia Alquisola, "Sa Tuwing Ikaw ay Tahimik at mga Tinig ng Mga Batang Tinutukso"
- Third Prize: John Enrico C. Torralba, "Lola Manghuhula"

=== Sanaysay ===
- First Prize: Allan B. Lopez, "Return Flight"
- Second Prize: Dayang Magdalena Nirvana T. Yraola, "Retorika ng Luksa"
- Third Prize: Jose Dennis C. Teodosio, "Ang Daigdig sa Ilalim ng Papag ni Lola Mude"

=== Dulang May Isang Yugto ===
- First Prize: Peter Solis Nery, "Gladiolas"
- Second Prize: Salvador Biglaen, "Balediksiyon"
- Third Prize: Joshua L. Lim So, "Sa Syquia, Malate, Kabanata I: Maraming Nagugutom sa Pilipinas"

=== Dulang Ganap Ang Haba ===
- First Prize: Joshua L. Lim So, "Tungkol kay Angela"
- Second Prize: Erick Dasig Aguilar, "Shambala"
- Third Prize: Peter Solis Nery, "Agimat"

=== Dulang Pampelikula ===
- First Prize: Rodolfo C. Vera, "Lakambini"
- Second Prize: Andrian M. Legaspi, "Ang Pag-ikot ng Salapi sa Panahon ni JLC"
- Third Prize: Antoinette H. Jadaone, "That Thing Called Tadhana"

== Regional Division ==
=== Short Story [Cebuano] ===
- First Prize: Noel P. Tuazon, "Gutom"
- Second Prize: Marcelo D. Baterna, "Utlanan"
- Third Prize: Jondy Medalle Arpilleda, "Kasina"

=== Short Story [Hiligaynon] ===
- First Prize: Alice Tan Gonzales, "Balay sang Monyeka"
- Second Prize: Norman Tagudinay Darap, "Olayra"
- Third Prize: No Winner

=== Short Story [Iluko] ===
- First Prize: No Winner
- Second Prize: Ronelyn Ramones, "Gapu Ken ni Angelica"
- Third Prize: Roy V. Aragon, "Mennamenna ti Maysa a Mannurat iti Ipupusayna, Iti Maysa a Nadagaang A Malem"

== Kabataan Division ==
=== Kabataan Essay ===
- First Prize: Harvey James G. Castillo, "Avoiding the Fate of Gregor Samsa"
- Second Prize: Vicah Adrienne P. Villanueva, "Adrift on a Promise"
- Third Prize: John Jason Berangel Santillan, "The Unwritten Rule"

=== Kabataan Sanaysay ===
- First Prize: Pamela A. Mendoza, "Bago Pa Tuluyang Maligaw"
- Second Prize: No Winner
- Third Prize: No Winner
