= Golden Screen TV Awards =

Philippines TV awards

- Current: Golden Screen TV Awards 2014
- Awarded for: Awards Night recognizing TV programs and personalities
- Country: Philippines
- Presented by: Entertainment Press Society
- First award: 2004

Golden Screen TV Awards is a yearly awards night that recognizes the outstanding programs and personalities from different TV networks in the Philippines including ABS-CBN, TV5, GMA Network, among others.

It was created in 2004 by the Entertainment Press Society (ENPRESS), a group of entertainment writers from newspapers. Before the awards night (usually held in March), the ENPRESS members are taking reviews and deliberations of the nominees for three months.

== List of Awards ==
- Outstanding Educational Program & Program Host
- Outstanding Lifestyle Program & Program Host
- Outstanding Magazine Program & Program Host^
- Outstanding Public Affairs Program & Program Host^
- Outstanding Public Service Program & Program Host^
- Outstanding Game/Talent Program & Program Host
- Outstanding Celebrity Talk Program & Program Host
- Outstanding Documentary Program & Program Host^
- Outstanding News Program^
- Outstanding Male/Female News Presenter^
- Outstanding Showbiz Talk Program
- Outstanding Male/Female Showbiz Talk Program Host
- Outstanding Adapted Reality/Competition Program & Program Host
- Outstanding Natural History/Wildlife Program & Program Host
- Outstanding Crime/Investigative Program & Program Host
- Outstanding News Magazine Program^
- Outstanding Comedy Program
- Outstanding Gag Program
- Outstanding Musical Program
- Outstanding Variety Program
- Outstanding Male/Female Host in a Musical or Program
- Outstanding Adapted Drama Program
- Outstanding Original Drama Program
- Outstanding Single Drama/Telemovie Program
- Outstanding Breakthrough Performance by an Actor/Actress
- Outstanding Supporting Actor/Actress in a Gag or Comedy Show
- Gawad Dolphy Lifetime Achievement Awards

(^only added in 2011)

=== Helen Vela Lifetime Achievement Awards ===
Named after the actress, radio announcer and drama anthology host Helen Vela, the Helen Vela Lifetime Achievement Awards has been honored the distinguished achievements of personalities in Philippine television. It has 3 categories that will be presented this year, Drama, Comedy and News Broadcast.

== See also ==
- List of Asian television awards
- PMPC Star Awards for Television
