= Maging Sino Ka Man: Ang Pagbabalik =

2007–08 Philippine television drama series

- Also known as: More Than Love 2
- Genre: Family drama Romance
- Created by: ABS-CBN Studios
- Directed by: Rory B. Quintos; Mae Czarina Cruz-Alviar
- Starring: John Lloyd Cruz; Bea Alonzo; Sam Milby; Anne Curtis; Toni Gonzaga; Angelica Panganiban; Derek Ramsay
- Theme music composer: Rey Valera
- Opening theme: "Maging Sino Ka Man" by Erik Santos / Vina Morales
- Country of origin: Philippines
- Original language: Tagalog
- No. of episodes: 78 (list of episodes)

Production
- Executive producers: Carlo Katigbak; Cory Vidanes; Laurenti Dyogi; Malou Santos; Ginny Monteagudo-Ocampo
- Producers: Narciso Y. Gulmatico, Jr.
- Running time: 20-30 minutes
- Production company: Star Creatives

Original release
- Network: ABS-CBN
- Release: December 10, 2007 – March 28, 2008

Related
- Maging Sino Ka Man

Maging Sino Ka Man: Ang Pagbabalik (international title: More Than Love 2) is a Philippine television drama romance series broadcast by ABS-CBN. The 78-episode series is a sequel to the 2006 drama series Maging Sino Ka Man. It was directed by Rory B. Quintos and Mae Czarina Cruz-Alviar, and stars John Lloyd Cruz, Bea Alonzo, Sam Milby, Anne Curtis, Toni Gonzaga, Angelica Panganiban, and Derek Ramsay. It aired in the Philippines on the network's Primetime Bida lineup and worldwide on TFC from December 10, 2007 to March 28, 2008 in the time slot after Pangarap na Bituin and before the South Korean drama series Lovers.

== Cast and characters ==
=== Main cast ===
Actor	Character	Character description
John Lloyd Cruz	Gabriel "Eli" H. Roxas	Having grown up in a poor family, Eli later uncovers his true identity and the wealth connected to his origins. He believes that love can withstand any challenge, including differences in social standing. An accident and a brutal discovery lead him to take back his birthright. He is newly married to Jackie at the start of this series.
Bea Alonzo	Jacqueline "Jackie" Madrigal-Roxas	Jackie is the única hija, or the only daughter, of a banking magnate. Jackie and her new husband, Eli, come from opposing social backgrounds. After events send her life into a whirlwind, she tries to reconstruct her identity without Eli.
Sam Milby	Jaime "JB" R. Berenguer	JB is the heir to the Roxas Shipping empire managed by his mother, Corazon. JB is a man who has everything—except his freedom. He always desires to help and please his mother. He is married to Celine Magsaysay, but he falls into despair after her death from cancer.
Anne Curtis	Celine Magsaysay-Berenguer	JB's fiancée and later wife, Celine is a strong woman, facing every trial head-on while presenting a tough image. However, she carries a sadness that she cannot let go. She dies from pancreatic cancer.
Toni Gonzaga	Monaliza "Onay" Dimaano / Anna Joy Romualdez	Onay is Eli's half-sister and later Celine’s caregiver. Thought to be Oca's daughter, she is actually the presumed-dead daughter of Mateo. She can see the future through her cards. She becomes Celine's caregiver and best friend, promising Celine that she will take care of JB. She later falls in love with JB, but tries to hide her feelings while JB tries to accept her.
Angelica Panganiban	Elena "Lena" R. Madrigal	Lena is Jackie's older half-sister and is initially depicted as spoiled and entitled. After realizing the luck she has with her newfound family, she changes her ways. It is her mission to be reunited with her long-lost love, Joaquin. After a fight with her sister, she finds refuge in the church. During a medical mission, Lena falls ill and dies soon after. She is laid to rest beside Joaquin.
Derek Ramsay	Joaquin Delos Santos	Lena Rubio's blind boyfriend, Joaquin runs away from home to look for Lena, and is later revealed to have been killed after being struck by a vehicle.

=== Supporting cast ===
Actor	Character	Character description
Christopher de Leon	Fidel Madrigal	Fidel is Jackie's father and a wealthy banking magnate. Believing that he is cheated on by the women in his life, he becomes bitter. He is willing to risk it all to achieve the peace he's been longing for.
Chin-Chin Gutierrez	Corazon Roxas Berenguer Romualdez	Corazon is JB's mother and the ex-matriarch of Roxas Shipping Lines. She comes from a dark past that gives her a hateful outlook on life, but she has a pure heart screaming to be freed. She is married to Mateo and runs his Uni-Pak company. In Mateo, she finds the pieces that fill the void in her once broken heart.
Rosanna Roces	Veronica "Veron" Rubio	Veron is the former mistress of Don Fidel and the mother of Lena. She desires revenge on those who persecuted her in the past. She drops from the scene to marry a wealthy businessman. She returns when Lena falls ill.
Phillip Salvador	Samuel "Mateo" Romualdez	Mateo is Corazon's husband, Eli and Onay's biological father, and Lena's father figure. Mateo has a lot of trouble in his life. He serves time for the murder of Monique, but is later found innocent after it is revealed that Fidel was the true murderer.
Bing Pimentel	Monique Madrigal	Monique is Fidel's estranged wife and Jackie's estranged mother until they are reunited. She comforts Fidel when he is troubled and acts as a pacifier whenever there is a domestic problem. She dies in a shootout between Fidel and Mateo.
Glenda Garcia	Gloria Roxas	Gloria is Corazon's younger sister, JB's aunt, and Eli's mother. She has some personality quirks, but JB runs to her first in a crisis. When her only son is taken away from her, she suffers from PTSD. This stress eventually fades when she is reunited with her son, Eli.
Vice Ganda	Joko	Joko is Onay's cousin and partner in taking care of their grandfather.
Lou Veloso	Lolo Bogs	Lolo Bogs is the grandfather and only relative of Onay and Insan.
Bembol Roco	Tomas Arroyo	Corazon's companion, Tomas wants everything to take place according to his plan. He treats Corazon like a possession and tortures or beats her whenever she gets away from him or accuses him of cheating. He is also Fidel's fraternity brother and responsible for some of Mateo's troubles. He is killed by Mateo's goons after attempting to kill Corazon and JB.
Tommy Abuel	Daniel Jimenez	Daniel is Mateo's longtime business partner and friend. His loyalty is questioned due to his associations with all three of the power-hungry men: Fidel, Mateo, and Tomas.
Smokey Manaloto	Apolinario "Pong" Davide	Pong is Eli's older brother. He was admitted to a medical institution due to physical injuries and mental trauma. After a long stay, Pong is released and struggles to assimilate back into the outside world.
Juliana Palermo	Vanessa Domingo	Vanessa is JB's socialite boss who tries to seduce him.
Malou de Guzman	Bebeng	Bebeng is a friend of Jackie and Eli. She is coping with the loss of her husband, Mang Simo.
Anita Linda	Impo	Impo is Lena's confidante and a famous psychic and paranormal healer.
Angel Aquino	Andrea	Andrea is Onay's mother.
Val Iglesias	Jacinto	Jacinto is a syndicate influence enlisted in the fight against Mateo.
Jon Avila	Mark	Mark is Jackie's new boss and secret admirer.

== Plot ==
=== Part 1: Six Months Later ===
Six months after Eli and Jackie’s marriage, their lives appear harmonious. They enjoy a second honeymoon in Barcelona. Jackie's parents have reconciled. JB and Celine are engaged. Jackie informs Eli that she might be pregnant.

Tensions arise when Jackie discovers she is not pregnant. At the same time, Celine experiences severe stomach pains. JB suspects that she may be pregnant. Meanwhile, the Madrigals' newly inaugurated business becomes the target of a mysterious bombing.

A new character, Jessica, enters the story and confronts Fidel about their past affair. Veronica then reveals that Lena is also Fidel’s daughter and vows revenge for the hardships she and her daughter have endured.

While Jackie carries out charity work for the victims of the bombing, Veronica (also called Veron) disguises herself as a frail mother caring for a sick daughter who happens to idolize Jackie. Out of compassion, Jackie promises to visit the child, unknowingly setting in motion a new series of events that will once again change the course of her life.

=== Part 2: The Revenge of the Mistress and the Daughter ===
Everyone is uneasy as a new day begins. Veronica reveals that Lena is Fidel’s daughter, renewing conflict within the Madrigal family. Eli tries to convince Mr. Jimenez to invest in Fidel's project, but he declines because of Fidel's reputation. Eli is forced to defend Fidel's credibility, but ends up upsetting both Mr. Jimenez and Fidel. He goes to St. Rita to seek comfort and confide in Dadoods at his grave.

Meanwhile, Jackie and Celine are upset to learn that Veron has tricked them into coming to her home only to tell them that Lena is Jackie's half-sister. Jackie and Celine are unconvinced and leave, but Jackie remains bothered by the incident. Jackie discovers that Celine might be pregnant, but is saddened by the fact that she might end up not having a child. Lena confronts her mother and asks her to stop begging the Madrigals to accept her as family, but Veron insists on seeking revenge. Lena decides to run away. She returns to St. Rita to reunite with Joaquin, her one true love. She fails to find him there, but meets Eli and mistakes him for Joaquin. Veron tries to seduce Fidel while Monique and Jackie are away, but she is stopped.

Amang (Mateo) tells Eli about his dark past with Fidel. He was badly beaten when he was young and left for dead. A woman found him, they had a relationship, and they had daughters: Onay and Annajoy. He also reveals that Mateo's hand is disfigured because Fidel ordered Tomas to shoot Mateo's hand. When Mateo goes abroad for a better living, he learns that his wife was raped by Fidel. He returns to the Philippines for revenge, but is stopped by his wife. A fire breaks out and he believes that his wife and daughter have perished, but his daughter, Onay, survives. When Fidel asks Eli about his business plans for Mateo, Eli tells his father-in-law that he will let Mateo join their company. Fidel feels uneasy because Mateo's assistant, Veron, tells him that she will be in his office as long as Mateo is in his house.

Corazon shares moments with Mateo. When she heads home, Tomas kidnaps her. Tomas drives her to their house where he beats her and holds her at gunpoint. Corazon tries to resist, and Mateo goes into Tomas's house. JB enters the house as Tomas and Mateo fight over the gun. JB is accidentally shot and is rushed to the hospital. Celine vomits and Onay rushes her to the hospital. Tomas is assaulted by Amang's men.

=== Part 3: Quarrel Tension ===
Lena realizes that Eli is not Joaquin. Jackie feels remorseful and vows to find Lena's true love, strengthening their bond as sisters.

After working overnight, JB is pressured by both Celine and his boss. Vanessa forces him to party with their team in order to have his proposal approved by the board. Corazon continuously complains about being left at home alone.

Celine avoids JB's calls. Onay helps Celine find a nice dress to wear for an attempted truce with JB. Celine and Onay drop by at JB's office that night, not knowing that he's been forced to go to the party.

Eli makes peace with Corazon when Mateo asks him to deliver a gift to her. However, Eli can't persuade Corazon to let go of the past. It is implied that restoring her shipping business might be the only thing that could change her mind.

=== Part 4: Life Begins, Life Ends ===
Mateo is enjoying a lunch date with Corazon when he spots Fidel and Monique in the restaurant. He invites them both to join them, even though the tension between the two men is obvious. Mateo mentions how he would have married a girl once, but that his chance was ruined because of an enemy. Fidel switches tables before Monique can understand the implication.

Lena, Jackie, and Eli join forces in the search for Joaquin. Eli learns that his near-death experience has made him open to odd visions. Nana Impo tells them that perhaps Eli's recent dream is telling them to return to the place where Lena and Joaquin first fell in love. Nana Impo reminds Eli that love will always guide him through various struggles.

While looking at Monique's lifeless body in the morgue, Jackie struggles to accept her mother’s death. Upon seeing Fidel, Jackie expresses her fury for how he caused this to happen, all for the sake of money, power, and pride. For Jackie, it makes no difference who is at fault, because she and her father are haunted by their memories of Monique.

Eli feels helpless around Jackie's grief and accuses Mateo of killing Monique. Mateo cannot remember what happened and believes that he's not guilty of the crime. Since Eli has alread judged him, Mateo chooses not to defend himself to his son or to Corazon. He only knows that he will fight Fidel until the end.

JB blames himself for Monique's death for telling Eli about his long-lost sibling, who pushed Mateo into facing Fidel in a duel. Unknown to either of them, Lolo Bogs tries to persuade Onay to meet her father before it's too late. Onay is having second thoughts because she can't forgive the person who abandoned her and her mother.

At the funeral, Jackie refuses to leave Monique's resting place, so Eli gives her privacy. Eli bumps into his father-in-law who swears that he and Mateo will pay for the death of his wife.

=== Part 5: Jealousy and Anger ===
In Tagaytay, Vanessa takes a liking to JB and tries to seduce him. She enters his bedroom in the middle of the night, but JB brushes her off. JB makes it clear that he's committed to Celine, so Vanessa resigns herself to being friends.

In the spa, Corazon guilt trips Celine for letting JB shoulder the burden in their family. This adds to Celine's despair, especially after hearing the doctor's diagnosis that her cancer is advancing and that the chemotherapy has failed.

Celine chooses to suffer alone. She secretly checks on JB at his work site and decides to return home. Onay refuses to let her set off alone. When JB arrives home, he is shocked to see that most of Celine's clothes are gone.

=== Part 6: Celine's Death ===
Everyone, except Mateo, participates in scattering Celine's ashes on the beach. Even Corazon grieves for Celine's death and regrets distancing herself from her daughter-in-law. JB pretends to be strong enough to move on as he busies himself with work in Mateo's company. The company is being managed by his mother for the time being.

Corazon asks JB not to push himself too hard. He brushes off her concerns and accuses her of being relieved that Celine is gone. Onay witnesses this exchange and tells JB that Celine would be disappointed with his attitude. JB doesn't care about anything anymore, except putting an end to his misery.

After several months, the court sentences Mateo to murder. Onay suggests a motion for appeal, but her father insists on going to prison. Mateo asks for Eli's forgiveness and advises Eli on how to fix his problems with Jackie. Jackie decides to annul their marriage.

=== Part 7: Who's to Blame ===
Onay punches Eli in the face to try to stop him from doing anything reckless. His encounter with Jackie and her boss causes him to drink the entire night. Onay is forced to take leave to look after her brother. Onay's absence from the office enrages JB and he vents his frustrations to Corazon. Corazon laughs at his strange reaction.

When Eli gets sober, he visits Monique's grave. He realizes that it's too late to fix his marriage, so he meets with Jackie to tell her that he will cooperate with their annulment process. At Mateo's company, Onay presents her new marketing ideas to the board, but JB embarrasses her by discrediting her report. She later learns that JB hates her because she reminds him of Celine.

=== Part 8: Trials ===
When JB gets into an accident, Onay looks after him and honours her promise to Celine. JB resents her concern at first, but he makes peace with his grief once he recovers from his injuries. JB tries to be nicer to Onay. Her secret feelings for JB return, especially after Corazon gives Onay her blessing.

Meanwhile, Jackie and Eli's annulment case plays out in court. Jackie strengthens her petition when she describes Eli and Lena's betrayal, which she believes led to her miscarriage. Outside the trial, Eli begins to pick up the pieces in his life by performing well at Mateo's company. Jackie is oblivious to Lena's visits to Monique's grave and is left in shock after seeing Eli on a date at a local restaurant.

=== Finale of Book 2 ===
After two years in prison, Mateo is troubled by recurring dreams about Monique. He realized that Daniel witnessed the incident, and learns that Fidel fired the shot that killed his wife. He shares this with Eli and Onay, and decides to reopen his murder case.

Fidel reacts strongly to the revelation. He is also haunted by his memories of Monique's death, especially after seeing Eli again. Still in denial, he forces Jackie to promise him that she will never reconcile with Eli as a way of avoiding the truth.

Jackie receives a message from a mysterious caller, who tells her that he knows what really happened to her mother. She agrees to meet secretly with this person, not realizing that he overheard the whole exchange.

The truth about Monique's death remained a mystery since Daniel had been scared to speak out during Mateo's trial two years prior. As he stands up for justice, Mateo escapes the prison to face Fidel again, in the same place they fought before.

Jackie, JB, Onay, and Eli arrive in time to stop them from killing each other. When Fidel refuses to calm down, Mateo reveals that Fidel was Monique's killer. Faced with his own guilt, Fidel ends up in a mental hospital despite Jackie's forgiveness.

Six months later, Mateo is released from prison. Corazon encourages JB to try love again, and Jackie realizes that she still loves Eli. This time, Jackie runs after him just when he's about to give up on her. Eli hears her plea, and they reconcile. Jackie gets pregnant again and remains happily married to Eli.

JB seeks Onay's forgiveness when back on the island. Onay, agrees to be friends with him as long as they maintain their special memories of Celine.

== Marketing ==
The series was part of ABS-CBN's promotion of its prime-time lineup for the first quarter of 2008. The 'One Gr8 January 28' launch included three other prime time shows premiering on the same night (Kung Fu Kids, Lobo, and Palos).
