= List of Maging Sino Ka Man: Ang Pagbabalik episodes =

The following is the list of episodes from the second season of the ABS-CBN primetime drama series Maging Sino Ka Man.

The season premiere of this Philippine television drama series aired on December 10, 2007.

A total of 78 episodes aired in this series. The final episode was aired on March 28, 2008. This list is ordered by the original airdates in the Philippines.

== Series overview ==
Week	Episodes	Originally released	
Week	Episodes	First released	Last released
1	5	December 10, 2007	December 14, 2007
2	5	December 17, 2007	December 21, 2007
3	5	December 24, 2007	December 28, 2007
4	5	December 31, 2007	January 4, 2008
5	5	January 7, 2008	January 11, 2008
6	5	January 14, 2008	January 18, 2008
7	5	January 21, 2008	January 25, 2008
8	5	January 28, 2008	February 1, 2008
9	5	February 4, 2008	February 8, 2008
10	5	February 11, 2008	February 15, 2008
11	5	February 18, 2008	February 22, 2008
12	5	February 25, 2008	February 29, 2008
13	5	March 3, 2008	March 7, 2008
14	5	March 10, 2008	March 14, 2008
15	3	March 17, 2008	March 19, 2008
16	5	March 24, 2008	March 28, 2008

== Episodes ==
All airdates for each episode are those from the Philippines.

=== Week 1 ===
No. overall	Number in Week	Original release date
1	1	December 10, 2007
Six months after their wedding, Eli and Jackie take a honeymoon in Barcelona. JB proposes to Celine, who willingly accepts it. A girl named Lena is introduced working in a massage parlor. Mateo goes to the factory where the unknown woman, who once congratulated Eli and Jackie in their wedding, works, and reveals that Fidel Madrigal is the father of her daughter. A bombing occurs during the inauguration of the new PDBC building, which spires the reactions of Monique, Gloria, Tomas, and Corazon. While Jackie learns of a false alarm with her pregnancy, JB speculates that Celine is pregnant herself. Eli and Jackie rush back to the Philippines, with Fidel dismayed with Eli's impulsive action. In a flashback, it is revealed that during Fidel's disability, Veronica swore to him while pulling out strands of his hair. Veronica vows revenge to Fidel and all his loved ones. Veronica acts as a person in need to Jackie, asking her to visit their house. As Jackie leaves, an evil grin appears from her face as she sees Eli.
2	2	December 11, 2007
Eli attempts to seal a business deal but fails. Celine takes some medication in an attempt to keep it a secret from JB. Celine and Jackie visit Tondo to visit Veronica in which Lena butts in and defends her mother. Celine and Jackie discuss with JB the possibilities of the DNA test. Fidel scolds Eli on the failure of the business deal. Lena runs away from Veronica to go to a man named Joaquin. Eli visits the grave of his adoptive father in the cemetery, while Samuel and Veronica have a discussion. Lena arrives at a barrio to learn that Joaquin never returned after she left. She then had a flashback of the moments she had with him. Eli's car gets broken down in Sta. Rita, who was spotted by Lena. As Lena approaches Eli, she nearly gets hits by a running jeepney. As Eli tries to help her, she can only call him Joaquin.
3	3	December 12, 2007
Celine visits Corazon and invites her to their engagement party with JB. Lena goes back home to her mother with the help of Eli. Eli spots Samuel, follows him, and is shocked with what he saw. Eli tells Jackie about seeing his father, and about Lena, and reacts saying that the Lenas they know may be one. JB and Celine argue about the latter's appointment, but reconcile with JB saying that he does not want to lose Celine. A mysterious man attacks Veronica, but runs away when Lena and the neighbors arrive. Lena remembers the time when she was still a little girl, when Fidel did not recognize her as a daughter. She then vows that they will get back what is theirs. At their engagement party, JB offers a song to Celine. Corazon sees this, and badmouths everyone. She proposes a toast "to sons who abandon their mothers, and to the sluts who take them away", and splashes wine to Celine. Lena and veronica arrive at the party, confronts Fidel, and all hell breaks loose. As these events are happening, Samuel observes from afar.
4	4	December 13, 2007
JB learns of Celine's sickness. Discussions on the incident are being done by Lena, Veronica and Samuel, and Eli, Jackie, Fidel and Monique. Veronica insists Fidel to accept Lena in their household. Jackie disagrees with the idea of Lena living in their house. Lena arrives at the Madrigal house, and immediately clashes with Jackie. JB and Celine consult a doctor, and learn that Celine has cancer. Eli spots Samuel and a former client meeting in a restaurant. Dinner occurs in the Madrigal house, but Lena overacts. Eli meets with Gloria for dinner, and she says that not all the actions of the people around them are true. Eli arrives home and is spotted by Lena.
5	5	December 14, 2007
Celine has already accepted that she will never recover from her illness and is decided to just make the most out of the remainder of her life. However, everyone around her seems to be stressed over their own issues. JB is scared to lose his one love. Eli feels the pressure of having to do something to save the company and even sought the help of his father, Mateo, to get Jimenez back to invest in their company. Meanwhile, Lena is feeling lonely living in the mansion with nothing to do and no one to talk to. She does things to make Fidel notice her. But instead, she gets scolded for her behavior and so Jackie was asked to teach Lena how to dress more appropriately. Jackie on the other hand is getting overly annoyed by the presence of Lena and jealousy begins to creep into her as she notices the way Eli looks at her half sister.

=== Week 2 ===
No. overall	Number in Week	Original release date
6	1	December 17, 2007
Jackie and Lena clash over dinner. JB plans to have a civil wedding with Celine, but Celine refuses. Lena imagines the figurine given to her is Joaquin, and decides to fight back. Eli comforts Jackie with regards to their situation with Lena. Eli fails to secure a business deal. JB accepts a job in real estate. Lena and Jackie spend time together, but constantly bicker with each other. Eli is surprised to learn that a business deal was sealed because of him. Celine and JB consult a doctor for an operation. JB plans to tell Imelda about Celine's condition, but does not continue after learning that Imelda is pregnant. Lena chases a blind man who she thinks is Joaquin, but almost gets her and Jackie into an accident. Celine and JB go attend a doctor's appointment, but Celine runs away crying when seeing a suffering patient.
7	2	December 18, 2007
Lena tells Veronica about Fidel's family and how they "plastic" they are. Lena demands for cellphone and a new car but Fidel disagrees. Lena then tells Veronica about it. Fidel apologizes to Jackie for how he acted to Lena. Lena looks from the outside, feeling jealous. Celine and JB exchange apologies for what happened to the hospital. Veronica and company stormed Fidel's house via the swimming pool, which ends up with Fidel freaking them to go out. Jackie and Lena debate. Fidel tries to have restraining order against Lena. JB goes to Corazon and asks for money. Corazon fails to give him money because she too has none. JB was left weeping on the floor.
8	3	December 19, 2007
Lena gets mad when she finds out that her mother, Veronica, is not part of her birthday party at all. During the party, JB bumps into a waitress. Veronica hesitates to go down Samuel's car to join the party. Lena gets mad against Jackie because she thinks that they planned everything for her mother not to come to the party. Lena overhears some visitors asking Monique if Lena is a prostitute. JB asks the waitress he bumped earlier for ice, and she kept on putting ice on his glass, staring at him. Fidel feels thankful for the new members of his family. Lena asks Veronica why she didn't come. Lena said she wanted to introduce her mother during the party. Lena left Veronica crying.
9	4	December 20, 2007
Celine was rushed to a hospital and Eli and Jackie came to comfort her and JB. The two couples swore to help each other out and not keep secrets about Celine’s condition anymore. When Celine was feeling a little better, she asked JB to go to the market and buy her fresh crabs. There, JB met Onay again. They had a little discussion about Onay’s pet crab and she was very upset that the man she calls her “soulmate” didn’t even recognize her. Still upset with how her party went, Lena comforted herself with a photograph of Joaquin she found in her mother’s home. Soon, she got dressed and left. Meanwhile, Veron asked Mateo to convince Lena to return to the Madrigals’ mansion. When she returned home, she found that Lena had broken the window and took her things. Everyone began to worry as Lena hadn’t told anyone where she was planning to go. Veron asked Eli to go and check on her daughter whom she suspected to have gone to Sta. Rita at Joaquin’s house. Eli found Lena there but she refused to join him on his way home.
10	5	December 21, 2007
On the way home after his search for Lena, Eli meets an accident and has an odd dream about an invisible strangler and a white dove. Jackie frantically searches for Eli and finds him in the crash. Meanwhile, Celine goes through her treatment and she and JB meet Onay at the hospital. When they returned to the spa, Celine tries to act normal in front of employees and guests, unaware that Corazon and Tomas are watching from afar. Tomas concludes that JB was only trying to con his own mother for money but she insisted otherwise. Suddenly, Mateo appears on the scene to talk to Corazon but she refused to talk to him. On the other hand, Lena has returned home to Veron and the two reconnect. She promised never to return to the Madrigals but Mateo convinces her that she should return for her and her mother’s sake. However, a mysterious man sets the nearby houses on fire and the shanties are suddenly eaten up by flames. Meanwhile, Eli has nightmares and wakes up screaming Lena’s name.

=== Week 3 ===
No. overall	Number in Week	Original release date
11	1	December 24, 2007
The whole neighborhood of Veron was set in flames by a mysterious arsonist. Everyone panicked and Lena realized her mother is missing and could still be inside. Eli woke up from his nightmare and did not even recognize his own wife. Jackie slapped him back to sanity and he apologized for hurting her. Soon, Monique came knocking at the couple’s door to tell the news about Veronand Lena. Eli rushed to see Lena and Jackie got worried and a little jealous. Veron got trapped inside the compound but Mateo was able to get her out just in time. Eli and Fidel arrived to help Lena. Fidel tried to protect his daughter from the press but Lena was offended that her father was more concerned about his family’s reputation than her mother’s life. Eli on the other hand tried to find Veron. He saw her with Mateo and led her to daughter. Fidel, Eli, Lena and Veron returned to the mansion and now that her mother is homeless, Lena asked to let her mother stay with them for the meantime. Later on, it was revealed that the fire was Mateo’s doing as part of his plans to get revenge from Fidel. Meanwhile, Celine’s condition is getting worse and JB has vowed to stay by her side until she gets better.
12	2	December 25, 2007
Lena took her mother’s advice to act more friendly towards Jackie and her family. She decided to make breakfast for everyone which made Fidel very annoyed. Jackie felt even more uncomfortable now that both Lena and Veron are staying at their home and more so that Lena’s attitude towards her suddenly shifted from bad to good. Lena even asked Jackie if she could join her at the spa. Jackie confided her irritated feelings toMonique who asked her in return to extend her patience toward her sister. Meanwhile, Veron was envious of all the good things she’s seeing in the Madrigals’ home—both the material things and the family’s harmonious relationship—especially Monique’s lifestyle. She started dabbling with Monique’s belongings and almost got caught when Monique returned to get something that she had forgotten. On the other hand, both Eli and JB are having trouble at work. JB got scolded by his boss because of his numerous absences, while pressure is building up on Eli as problems at the power plant continue to arise and a mysterious “ghost” seemed to be haunting him.
13	3	December 26, 2007
Eli was led into an abandoned lighthouse by a mysterious shadow that had been lurking around him. Afterwards, he consulted a neurologist about his condition and the doctor suggested that he might have hada Near Death Experience which caused him to feel disturbed and distracted. All the while, Jackie confided to Celine how worried she is about her husband’s condition. But above that, she’s more worried and scared of the thought of losing Eli. Veron offered to help Monique in decorating the house. However, this was only her way to talk Monique into letting her stay at the mansion for a longer time. And Monique, being the modest woman that she is, agreed for her to stay until New Year’s Day. Jackie returned home and found that Lena had ironed all her clothes. This, of course, was just her way to make Jackie feel comfortable with her and so that she would let her come to the spa. Later on, Lena caught her mother trying to seduce Fidel.
14	4	December 27, 2007
Lena confronted Veron about what she caught her doing. Veron said that it was part of their plan to eventually destroy the harmonious relationship of Fidel’s family but Lena questioned her intentions because she feels that Veron might still have feelings for Fidel and that she’s making efforts for her own gain. Later that night, Lena and Eli rose from sleep after they had another one of their dreams. They met in the kitchen to get coffee and Veron snooped in on their small talk. Meanwhile, Fidel wanted to make Veron go away after what he saw her doing but Monique convinced him to let her stay for the holidays for Lena’s sake. The following day, Jackie and Eli brought Lena to the spa. Lena acted so excited and overwhelmed over the spa’s charming design and kept babbling and blurting some comments which offended Celine. She confronted Lena and the two had a steamy argument. Celine tried to calm down but JB noticed that his fiancée might be starting to get jealous over Jackie and Lena’s budding friendship. However, he assured her that there will never be a replacement for her in the lives of his loved ones.
15	5	December 28, 2007
On her way to a job interview, Onay’s grandfather suffered an asthma attack. She gave up all her savings just to get him treated which made her grandfather feel guilty that he’s becoming a pain to his granddaughter. Meanwhile, Lena had taken Eli and Jackie out to dinner and they were surprised that Lena had invited Mateo to join them. He shared stories about his closeness towards Veron and Lena which made Eli a little bit jealous. Celine broke down when she discovered that her hair is beginning to fall due to her chemotherapy. She went to the salon and had all her hair cut off. JB came to meet her after and felt very proud and even more in love with her. Back at the mansion, Veron tried to seduce Fidel but he didn’t seem to mind her at all. However, she seems to have plans to get Fidel and Jackie’s affections. She advised Lena to get Jackie’s trust by pretending to help her and Eli have a baby. Jackie on the other hand continued to doubt Lena’s sincerity, but Eli advised her to just let his sister be for now but take caution if she wants to.

=== Week 4 ===
No. overall	Number in Week	Original release date
16	1	December 31, 2007
Celine visited a hospital’s cancer ward for children and met a girl who wished to see fresh flowers. Celine granted the girl’s request and went to the market to shop for flowers but her phone got snatched and Onay helped her recover it. However, Celine got stressed out over the situation and collapsed. Onay took her to a nearby hospital but left soon when she realized that she had to return to her grandfather. Lena had taken Jackie out to shop for lingerie. But Jackie felt offended and she confronted her sister about her real intentions why she’s trying to act nice all of a sudden. Lena in turn pretended to feel offended by how Jackie thought of her. Jackie apologized and the two went on with their shopping. Meanwhile, Mateo had finally surfaced as the new investor to Fidel’s company. Fidel got very upset and Eli felt guilty that he had done something wrong again. Later that night, Jackie surprised Eli with the lingerie that she and Lena bought which made him very happy.
17	2	January 1, 2008
Celine wanted to thank Onay personally for helping her at the market so JB called her and invited her to have lunch with them. Despite her hesitations and nervousness, Onaywent to the spa with Joko and met JB and Celine. She kept staring at JB the whole time which led her to create a few minor accidents on the dining table. Meanwhile, Veron tried to make Lena jealous of her sister having a nice and good-looking husband. Lena shook off the idea but in her sleep, she dreamt about Joaquin again. The next day, Jackie took them to their new apartment. Lena felt genuinely grateful for her sister’s kindness but Veron advised her never to trust Jackie. On the eve of Christmas, Lena and Veron joined Jackie and her family for Noche Buena. JB and Celine celebrated the night with a lovely dinner and JB gave Celine a scrapbook that told the story of their love.
18	3	January 2, 2008
On Christmas morning, Jackie and Eli surprised Lena with a shower of fake snow. Jackie told Lena to make a wish and she said that she wanted to have everything that Jackie has, which somehow made Jackie feel insecure. Onay also got a gift from Celine. Celine on the other hand got a gift from her mother—a set of hair accessories which she couldn’t uses anymore.But what made her sad is that she hasn’t even told her mother yet that she is sick. Eli was surprised to receive a gift from Mateo. This made him very happy and thanked Lena for reconnecting him with his father but Jackie got jealous over the growing bond between her husband and her sister. Fidel however, got suspicious as to why Mateo is suddenly trying to be a part of Eli’s life. Meanwhile, Mateo got a call from Corazon after she received the jewelry and cell phone he gave to her. She demanded him to reveal himself to her but Mateo kept his identity a secret and asked her to meet him. But before she could answer, Tomas had caught up with her and she had to put the phone down. Back at Veron’s apartment, Jackie had been helping out in cleaning up the place and gladly retold her love story to Veron and Lena.
19	4	January 3, 2008
Lena mistook Eli for Joaquin when he came to visit them at Veron’s apartment. Veron saw her daughter’s reaction when she saw Eli and persuaded her daughter to make her move towards Eli. Meanwhile, Corazon met up with Mateo while Tomas was gone. He didn’t show up but he gave her an expensive bracelet which made her very happy. What she doesn’t know is that Mateo has other plans for her. Back at the Madrigal mansion, Eli was having nightmares again. This time, Jackie was running away from him like he was a stranger to her. Soon, it was the dawn of a New Year and JB and Celine celebrated the night together in their own little way while the Madrigals did it in grand fashion. However, Mateo arrived to join them which made Fidel very upset. Tomas and Corazon on the other hand were greeted by a band with a message for Corazon which gave Tomas an idea that she was having an affair.
20	5	January 4, 2008
Mateo’s unexpected arrival at the Madrigals’ mansion made Fidel feel very annoyed. Jackie tried to convince her dad to set aside his differences with Mateo at least for the night and he agreed. However, when she went back outside to call everyone for dinner, she saw Lena on top of her husband after they “accidentally” fell on the ground. Eli apologized to her over dinner by kissing her right in front of everyone. After dinner, Fidel and Mateoended up having a heated conversation about their past. Tomas confronted Corazon, even to the point of hurting her, just to find out who her other man is but she refused to tell. She rushed to call Mateo on the phone but he was busy talking to Eli. Tomas soon caught up with her and she begged him to spare her. The two ended up making love in bed instead.

=== Week 5 ===
No. overall	Number in Week	Original release date
21	1	January 7, 2008
Veron revealed to Mateo her plans of making Eli and Lena fall in love with each other. She also kept egging Lena to admit that she’s in love with Eli. However, Lena denied it and she even apologized to Jackie for the incident that happened between her and Eli before Media Noche. Jackie on the other hand, admitted to Eli that she’s jealous of his closeness to Lena. The sweet couple drowned their worries in passion while on the other room, Lena was having a bad dream and she was calling Eli’s name. The next day, Lena poured her heart out to Veron and told her that she’s not in love with Eli but she sees Joaquin in him. Veron felt for her daughter and she finally allowed her to go out and look for Joaquin. Meanwhile, Corazon demanded Mateo to show himself to her. He promised her that they will meet soon. On the other hand, Onay was reading her fortune from her cards again and was surprised with the result she got—the jack of hearts, the queen of hearts, and the queen of spades in between.
22	2	January 8, 2008
Onay asks her cousin Joko if she can come into a battle where she is the underdog. Onay continues to play with her cards. Mateo plans to see with Corazon. Celine made JB breakfast in bed. She started to say "what if's" but JB soon stopped her. Fidel talks to Mateo's investigator and it said that Mateo has a dark background. Eli and Fidel had a slight tension. JB noticed that Celine stalls for her chemotherapy session. Celine tells JB that she just got scared. Tomas tells his maids to look after Corazon. Fidel offers Mr. Jimenez to buy bigger shares in his company. Tomas arrives at the restaurant where Fidel and Mr. Jimenez were at, and they see each other.
23	3	January 9, 2008
Tomas arrived at the restaurant and was surprised to find Fidel there. He remembered his last encounter with him back in their younger days when he was asked by Fidel to make Mateo’s life miserable. Meanwhile, Corazon had escaped and the housemaids alerted Tomas. Soon, Mateo walked inside the same restaurant and chatted with Daniel until Corazon arrived. Mateo saw her and he dragged her out of the restaurant to go back home.Tomas accused her of having an affair with someone else but Corazon lied that she only went out to follow him. Fidel went home after his meeting and he was very drunk. Veron found him almost tripping on the staircase and took him to his bedroom. She tried to seduce Fidel into making love with her but he refused and pushed her away. Veron got mad and confronted him about their past and insisted that he loved her too at one point. Fidel asked her to stop her craziness for the sake of Lena. On the other hand, Celine had gotten back from her treatment and was suffering from severe pain.
24	4	January 10, 2008
Jackie and Monique arrived home and saw Veron so shaken and was hurrying to leave.Celine felt bad that she’s becoming a sting to everyone around her, especially JB. Eli was bothered that Fidel is still upset about their last argument so he went to Mateo to know the truth about his history with Fidel and find out why his father-in-law dislikes him much. Mateo told him the whole story why Fidel’s anger towards him is far-flung. He admitted to having an affair with Fidel’s mother and Fidel sought revenge by beating him up. Fidel also told Mateo’s mother about the affair and she died of a heart attack. When Mateo was almost recovering from it all, Tomas came into picture and shot his hand which to him was the most important part of his body as he was a pianist. He soon found hope and love again in Andrea and their child, Ana Joy. But because life was hard in the Philippines, he went to Taiwan to work and Fidel found an opportunity to get back at Mateo through Andrea. Mateo returned home to seek revenge from Fidel after he raped Andrea. But their house got burned down including the woman he loved and his child.
25	5	January 11, 2008
Veron sulked in alcohol after she was rejected by Fidel. She vowed to seek revenge and prove to him that she’s worth more than what he thinks of her. Lena had sought the help of a fortune teller to find Joaquin. JB wanted to hire a professional caregiver to look after Celine when he’s gone.Celine suggested to get Onay but JB wasn’t confident enough that she could handle the job. Eli finally decided to seal the deal with Mateo and welcomed him to the company. Fidel agreed to sign, although he still disproved of Mateo personally. He got even more annoyed when Veron walked into the office as Mateo’s personal assistant. Meanwhile, Corazon finally met up with Mateo who showered him with many gifts—a ring and an old scarf which used to belong to her—and admitted his undying affections for her. He tried to seduce her but she asked to take things easy. Soon, she called it a night and left the building. However, Mateo had set her up so that Tomas would find her.

=== Week 6 ===
No. overall	Number in Week	Original release date
26	1	January 14, 2008
Tomas is livid with anger catching Corazon in her tryst with Mateo. Drawn to violence as usual, he beats her up as soon as they reach home. Tomas drags her in the stairway where Corazon falls after one of his hard blows. As if that wasn’t enough, Tomas retrieves his gun and shoots her. Though obviously in pain, Corazon struggles to fight for her life. Mateo is worried sick with Corazon’s plight. As such, he calls JB to tell him what’s happened and both of them immediately went to her rescue. Mateo reaches her first and a brawl ensues followed by JB’s arrival. But as JB carried his mom to safer grounds, Tomas suddenly gets the upper hand against Mateo, pulls the trigger and shoots the young man. Tomas runs away while Mateo rushes the wounded mother and son to the hospital. Meanwhile, Celine gets another one of her painful attacks while trying to locate JB. Good thing Onay also felt her pain and gets to her in time. Oblivious that JB’s also in danger, she chances upon Eli and Jackie in the same hospital. After seeing that Celine’s now in good hands, Onay bids them goodbye. But before she takes her leave, she learns too that JB got injured. Later, Celine dreams of JB where she pleads for him to stay. In her dream, JB gives her a promise that he will never leave her side. This seems to appease Celine’s troubled thoughts hence, paving the way for her peaceful sleep. On the other hand, Mateo is up for his final revenge against Tomas. His gunmen catch Tomas in a deserted place where he is thrashed. Pleading for his life, Tomas reiterates that the past is all Fidel’s fault, not his. However, Mateo did not stop his goons from killing him.
27	2	January 15, 2008
Gloria visits Corazon but the latter remains indifferent towards her concern. Corazon drives Gloria away but before she leaves, Mateo arrives, leaving her in shock for she sees how Mateo is still obviously taken with her sister. Onay is deeply concerned with Celine and JB's critical condition. As such, she decides to stay in the hospital. Though Celine remains unconscious, Onay continues to talk to her, asking her not to give up, until the former finally stirs from her deep slumber. Onay immediately calls Jackie and Eli, from whom Celine learns about JB’s accident. Meanwhile, Lena meets a famed clairvoyant known as Impo. As usual, she’s hoping to discover Joaquin’s whereabouts. But just like what other fortunetellers have told her, Impo says while it is true that Joaquin loves her, the time has not yet come for them to be reunited. What infuriates Lena though is the old woman’s dark foreboding that she should loathe the day they meet again instead of anticipating it. Back in the hospital, Corazon worries about JB but Mateo assures her that her son is in good hands. Then he tells her how the police has found Tomas' dead body. Corazon bursts out in tears, not because she grieves her lover's death but because she's finally free from the man's cruelty. Outside the ward, Mateo chances upon Gloria who thanks him for his support and acceptance of their son. However, Mateo gives her the cold shoulder and exclaims that with the way things are going, she really doesn’t have anything to be grateful for. To Eli though, Mateo easily acts like a doting father.
28	3	January 16, 2008
Celine was relieved to find that JB's life is out of danger. She later thanked Onay for helping her out and asked if the girl can stay on as her caregiver. Onay declined her offer. Mateo however caught the two talking and asked Celine to introduce him to her friend. Meanwhile, Veron was busy practicing her English when Lena arrived to tell her that she has been accepted as Mateo's new secretary. In the Madrigal Mansion, Eli got a shocker when Fidel announced that he's turning over his duties to his son-in-law during his two-week absence from work. Back at the hospital, Corazon finally got the strength to visit her son. The mother and son reconciled their differences, forgiving each other for their past wrongdoings.
29	4	January 17, 2008
Celine kept her calm in the wake of Corazon's insulting attitude but she vented out her frustration upon seeing Jackie. She reveals that Corazon will be staying with her and JB. Jackie explained that they will learn to coexist peacefully given time, just like how she is now with Lena. As it happens, Jackie and Lena became in good terms ever since the latter came home and confided about her hopeless search of Joaquin. Celine also grew emotional as she thought of the uncertainty of her future with JB. Meanwhile, Veron happily took her first call in Mateo's office and it turned out that Corazon was on the other line. She wittily said that her boss can't be reached at the moment, much to Corazon's annoyance. Later, she joined Mateo in a crucial meeting that Eli would be heading. Mateo was shocked to learn that Fidel wouldn't be there and questioned Eli's ability to face the board and the investors. Unknown to them, Fidel had appointed one of his directors to grill Eli's presentation, in which all of it would be reported back to him.
30	5	January 18, 2008
Lena experiences being snubbed by Corazon when she visits Celine with Jackie. She easily brushed it off as a big joke though and bonds with Celine, even apologizing for her rude behavior the first time they met. In fact, Lena even volunteers to become her private nurse but Celine refuses to be a bother to anyone. But Lena still insisted to look after her until such time she finds a professional nurse to care for her. Meanwhile, Onay's having a hard time landing a job. Mateo's morale booster to Eli works its wonders as he impresses the board with his detailed presentation. Even the investors congratulated him for doing a great job in handling his company’s interests. Mateo felt a surge of pride for his son as he acknowledges his work. However, Eli hears Anthony giving a full report to Fidel about his failed attempt to sabotage the presentation!

=== Week 7 ===
No. overall	Number in Week	Original release date
31	1	January 21, 2008
Mateo finally returns Corazon's call and she is growing impatient for them to meet again. Though Tomas is out of his way now, Mateo thinks that the time has not yet come for him to be with the woman he loved ever since. Jackie is worried that Celine's private nurse is not doing her job well. Even Corazon notices the futility of it, not out of concern for Celine but for JB who's paying for all the bills. The whole confrontation irks Jackie so she begs Corazon to show more compassion on her cousin for JB's sake. Listen she did, but Corazon merely brushed her words off afterwards. At the MadrigalMansion, Fidel congratulates Eli on his successful handling of the board meeting. Knowing how Fidel tried to sabotage it, Eli hints at his father-in-law’s involvement in the offensive incident. Fidel denies the hidden accusations behind Eli’s words and then storms angrily out of the room. Oblivious with the undercurrents between Fidel and Eli, Jackie asks Eli to maintain peace with Fidel. Jackie senses that the change in them started when Mateo entered their lives. But instead of revealing the extent of cruelty Fidel has done to Mateo, Eli keeps the whole truth from Jackie to avoid causing her more pain.
32	2	January 22, 2008
Eli unloads his frustrations to Lena. He’s raring to move out of the house to stop the growing dispute between him and Fidel but he’s concerned how it will affect Jackie. Unknown to the two, Fidel overhears their talk. As such, Fidel rebuffs Eli’s call for help regarding some business matters the next day. Celine’s nurse quits her job having had enough of Corazon’s nasty fits. Celine sweet-talks JB into convincing Onay to become her caregiver. Later, Onay is shocked to see JB at her doorstep. She repeatedly turns down his tempting offer of employment, much to Joko and her lolo’s exasperation. But before JB takes his leave, he insists that she think it over again. Meanwhile, Lena grows closer to Jackie as the latter cooks up a plan for them to find Joaquin through her daddy’s connections.
33	3	January 23, 2008
Fidel is irked by Jackie and Lena's stunt in involving Col. Miguel in their search for Joaquin. The two don’t let this deter their plans as they personally visit different homes for the blind to see any traces of Joaquin. Despite the setbacks, Lena remains obsessed with her missing boyfriend. On the other hand, JB is also annoyed with Celine’s obsession with Onay. He insists that it is high time they find other possible applicants for the nursing position. By this time, Onay is already preparing for her first day at work. To her shock though, it turns out that the agency placed her as a therapist for Celine’s spa! As if having an attack of diarrhea is not enough, she can hardly believe her ill luck as she spots Celine in the distance, until the latter notices her too. Onay reasons her way out of Celine’s determination to get her as a caregiver. Just when she’s about to go however, Onay changes her mind and accepts the job. Meanwhile, the white dove appears in Eli’s dreams again together with Joaquin who’s calling for help! Eli wakes up and sees the dove outside the terrace.
34	4	January 24, 2008
Jackie pushes Lena into preparing Fidel’s coffee. Fidel rejects the gesture and instead of showing her disappointment, Lena gets sarcastic on him. Lena then engages in an emotional discussion with Jackie about setting aside their former angst towards their situation as half-sisters. This time, they both accept the genuine love that is growing between them. Onay was off to her first day as Celine’s caregiver when she gets hampered by her lolo’s sudden asthma attack. As such, JB becomes furious with her tardiness and lashes out at her as soon as she arrives at the spa. Onay keeps her temper in check and consults her cards instead if she’s fated to stay. It turns out that she is. As such, she makes her way in the garden only to bump into Corazon, whose mean attitude Onay is yet to come across. Meanwhile, Eli is still haunted by his confusing dream during office hours. He even lists down the unknown man (Joaquin), the dove and other elements in his dream, just to grasp its meaning, yet nothing logical comes up. An investor even walks out on him during a private meeting for his mind keeps on straying elsewhere. Later, he learns that Fidel is back from his “shortened vacation”. Fidel calls Eli in his office only to boast about his capacity to fix the company problems.
35	5	January 25, 2008
Veron threatens Fidel that she will tell Monique that he's still having an affair with her. But Fidel merely calls her bluff and warns her instead that he can easily manipulate Lena into hating her, if Veron persists with her games. Veron is struck by the truth of this hence; she shifts her anger to Lena, who's now fond of Jackie and Monique. Lena is forced to defy Veron though for she desperately wants to stop their plans of revenge. Onay finally meets Corazon and is starstruck by the woman's beauty. She later asks Celine if Corazon also possesses JB's good qualities, but Celine refrains from making any comment. In the middle of the day, JB calls to check if everything's okay with Celine. And once again, Onay becomes the receiving end of his condescending attitude. Before Onay totally ignores his call, JB tells her not to leave the spa until he's not yet home. However, JB gets held in the office a little late than usual for he's still sorting out some company concerns. Then he meets Vanessa Domingo, the chairman's daughter, to whom he will closely work with for the coming months and who obviously have the hots for him! Meanwhile, Eli is still troubled by the dove's significance in his life. As such, he visits Dadoods in the cemetery where he reflects on his dream about the mysterious guy. Back home, Jackie notices his distress but Eli still refuses to voice out his anxieties.

=== Week 8 ===
No. overall	Number in Week	Original release date
36	1	January 28, 2008
Mateo finds Veron in tears after her bitter tiff with Lena. However, he insists that Lena was right in pointing out that Veron still pines after Fidel. And if stealing him from Monique is her plan, she's only bound to lose. Mateo further tells her that it's unfair of her to let Lena carry the same burden. Veron realizes the logic of this but she is mad at Fidel's family for getting Lena's sympathy. Jackie opens up to Monique that it's not healthy anymore for Fidel and Eli to live under the same roof. Monique is instantly shocked with the idea of them moving out. She asks Jackie to give her and Fidel enough time to adjust to this thought before they actually find a new home. Back at the spa, Celine is worried sick since JB hasn't called from the office yet. She almost convinces Onay to call the police station when JB suddenly arrives. But instead of breathing a sigh of relief, Celine is annoyed by the thought that a girl had driven him home. She confronts JB about it, but JB innocently shakes it off. However, Celine remains suspicious until the next day. Meanwhile, Eli visits his brother in jail. There he happens to see Pong leading his inmates in an upbeat dance-exercise. Eli is happy to note that Pong is really adjusting well to his life in prison. Pong explains that he's just thankful for the chance to start afresh. He even cites Eli's near-death experience, which proves that like him, Eli is also given back his life for a reason.
37	2	January 29, 2008
Jackie fails to ask Fidel to let Lena work in his company for the mere sight of Lena disgusts him. This setback however is replaced with good news from Col. Rosales for he tells her that he found a lead to Joaquin’s whereabouts. Lena is thrilled to be reunited at last with Joaquin and she dolls up for the meeting. However, this development results to Eli’s vision of the mysterious dove, covered with blood for the first time. Corazon finally meets Veron in person when she drops by Mateo’s penthouse. Veron remains undaunted by her arrogance though and even mocks her words. As such, Corazon reports the whole incident to Mateo, who in turn, apologizes for Veron’s actions. She asks him if Veron is his lover but Mateo assures her that she’s the only woman he loves. Monique confides to Fidel about Jackie’s plan to move out. Fidel immediately suspects that Eli’s behind such foolishness. He insists that Eli’s only making an issue out of nothing and he is determined to end it. Monique begs him not to overreact since Jackie may still change her mind. Meanwhile, Celine’s worried about JB getting home late again. Soon, she learns that JB has to stay in the office overnight for an important project. Then Celine overhears Vanessa calling JB repeatedly and is irritated by her demanding attitude. With that, Onay realizes that she also has to stay with Celine in the spa.
38	3	January 30, 2008
Fidel eases the tension between him and Eli. He explains that Mateo’s entry in their lives affected their harmonious relationship before. But he wants them to work hand-in-hand once more. Eli has no choice but to agree for Jackie’s sake yet he remains deeply troubled. His consultation with a shrink only confirms that he has to face his problems to stop his nightmares from recurring. Celine’s jealousy goes overboard as she spends the night at Onay’s home without telling JB. Onay persuades her though to leave him a message at the very least. As such, JB arrives to pick her up the next day. Celine is not moved despite JB’s worn-out look for she thinks that something’s going on between him and his boss. Since she is still unreasonable, JB gives up and walks away. Jackie’s concern towards Eli takes a backseat as she and Lena prepare to meet Joaquin. An old woman welcomes them in her home while explaining how she had adopted Joaquin in the past. But other than knowing that he makes good sculptures, she doesn’t know anything about his life.
39	4	January 31, 2008
Lena's hopes fell when 'Joaquin' turned out to be someone else. Jackie is so sorry about the whole thing that she vows to do everything in her power to find Lena’s true love. Lena tearfully assures her though that she appreciates her efforts to join her endless search, which has strengthened their bond as sisters. After working overnight, JB is doubly pressured by Celine’s stubbornness as well as his boss’s demands. Vanessa forces him to party with their team for having his condotel proposal approved by the board. As if that’s not enough, Corazon keeps on complaining about being left at home alone. Celine avoids JB’s calls the whole day. But instead of letting her drown in misery, Onay helps her find a nice dress to wear for her offer of truce with JB. Then they drop by at JBs office that night, not knowing that he’s off to some sort of celebration. Eli makes peace with Corazon when Mateo asks him to deliver a gift for her. However, no amount of begging on Eli’s part can persuade Corazon to let go of the past and that restoring her shipping business might be the only thing to change her mind.
40	5	February 1, 2008
Fidel makes up to Jackie by giving her a dinner surprise. Truth be told, it's more of a ruse to stop her from moving out. Then Fidel vows not to bring company problems at home to avoid personal confrontations with Eli. At the same time, Jackie forces him to spend one whole day with Lena! But her good deeds don't end there for she also tries her best to make Eli forget about his worries. Celine learns that JB has gone when she arrives his office. To her surprise though, a woman answers his phone when she called him! As it is, JB is in the washroom at that time so he didn't know that Vanessa has enraged her. As such, JB gets mad when Celine confronts Vanessa at the bar. This only increases Celine's suspicion that JB's screwing around. Back in the spa, JB opens up to his mom about his feelings of exhaustion. Corazon homes in however on the fact that he's already tired of caring for Celine. Her dislike towards Celine makes her say that illness doesn't give the latter the right to bitch around. On the other hand, Celine returns to Onay's home. She refuses to further impose on her kindness. Hence, she decides to have Jackie pick her up the next day.

=== Week 9 ===
No. overall	Number in Week	Original release date
41	1	February 4, 2008
Not even his own pain can stop JB from going to Celine. He picks her up at Onay's house but Celine still accuses him of cheating on her. JB feels defeated and walks away. However, his vows of love move Celine to tears, causing them to kiss and make up. Fidel is hell-bent in making things difficult for Eli at the office. He blames him for the financial difficulties in a project that the young man's spearheading. Good thing Eli has Mateo to turn to for some advice about his dilemma. He's pressured enough as it is, even Gloria's brief visit barely lifts his anxious mood. Back at the Madrigal home, Jackie doesn't allow Lena to wallow in depression after their failed search of Joaquin. Lena's protests are weak compared to Jackie's words so the two of them eventually busied themselves with simple house chores.
42	2	February 5, 2008
JB patches things up with Celine.And before leaving for home, the couple even gives Onay's family a breakfast treat for being such a good help to them. Back in his office however, Vanessa manipulates him into taking her on a date sometime as payback for Celine's scandalous actions in the restaurant before. Meanwhile, Eli is plagued by his dreams again, not knowing that the blind man is Lena's missing boyfriend. Jackie wakes him up, but this time, she fails to soothe his fears. Eli throws a fit for he can't deal with his confusing nightmares anymore. As such, he and Jackie drop by a church the next day to consult a priest about his experience. Soon after that, Jackie tells Lena to prepare for her surprise which turns out to be a day alone with Fidel!
43	3	February 6, 2008
At first, Fidel refuses to enjoy time with Lena at the amusement park. But with Lena’s urging, Fidel surprisingly starts enjoying himself in all the rides there. His aloofness towards his eldest daughter cracks as he sees her genuine hurt every time he rejects her efforts to be with him. And to cap off their special day together, Fidel introduces Lena as his daughter to a friend whom he bumps into at the theme park. Like them, Eli and Jackie take some time off to visit Pong in jail. Pong mentions an inmate who can refer them to an “albularyo” who may ward off Eli’s nightmares. Later, the two also drop by the spa where Celine and JB are having lunch. Corazon avoids their company though despite Eli’s sweet gesture towards her. As it happens, Mateo also joins the little gathering just to check on the young couples.
44	4	February 7, 2008
Before going home, Lena convinces Fidel to stop by a “carinderia” for dinner. Her antics have truly endeared her to Fidel who even agrees to take a picture with her. Later, Fidel even tells Monique that he actually had fun with Lena. As such, Lena is so grateful to Jackie for giving her the best surprise of her life. The next day, Jackie wakes up and finds Eli gone. Until she notices the petals scattered on the floor which leads to her favorite car outside. Apparently, Eli has taken one more day off to tour her around Manila. While they leisurely sat by the sea, Jackie offers to sketch a portrait of the man in Eli’s dreams but he says he can’t fully remember his face yet. For their last stop, Eli and Jackie drop by Aling Bebang’s place—much to the delight of Eli’s surrogate mother before.
45	5	February 8, 2008
Aling Bebeng gets emotional as she recalls her memories with Tata Simo. But she prefers to live alone than become a burden to Eli. Later, Eli mentions how he wants to start his own family away from his in-laws. Aling Bebeng agrees that it is the only way that he can nurture his relationship with Jackie. In the spa, Celine and Lena convince Onay to look into their past and future as soon as they learn that she’s into card-reading. Celine merely reminisces about the first time she fell in love with JB while Lena wants to know where Joaquin is. But during Lena's turn, Onay refuses to say what she saw in her cards except that Joaquin still loves her. Meanwhile, Vanessa tells JB that their client wanted him to stay on-site for a week. JB explains that it’s impossible for he has other priorities other than supervising a construction project in Tagaytay. But Vanessa insists that the decision is not theirs to make and adds that she was also tasked to accompany him.

=== Week 10 ===
No. overall	Number in Week	Original release date
46	1	February 11, 2008
Eli suffers from his nightmares again. And this time, he gets a clear image of the man who's calling for help. He describes him to Jackie who in turn makes a sketch of the mystery guy. The next day, they ask the police to conduct a search on him. Later, the couple happily share their day with Fidel and Monique. The subject of raising a family comes up so Eli and Jackie take the opportunity to reveal their plans about establishing a home of their own. Meanwhile, JB comes home with his first big paycheck much to the delight of Celine. He explains to her though that the coming months will be a lot busier at the office and he might be needed to stay on-site with Vanessa for a week.Celine accepts this news understandingly. After showing indifference for quite a while, Veron finally talks to Lena again. Veron is glad to hear that things are going smoothly for Lena at the Madrigals’ and decides that it’s time now to think about her own happiness. As such, Lena is shocked to see her mother gone during her next visit.
47	2	February 12, 2008
Vanessa is really out to steal JB from Celine. She drops by the spa during the weekend just to get a file from him. Corazon is obviously taken with her and even rubs it in Celine’s face. Meanwhile, JB asks for Onay’s help to look for the file. Onay quickly finds it to send Vanessa on her way. However, Corazon invites Vanessa to stay until dinner. Veron has left a letter to Lena saying that she flew to Dubai with Bahad. Lena feels abandoned but she also understands that her mom merely wants to be happy herself. Later, Jackie and Eli help her pack the stuff in Veron’s house. Incidentally, Joaquin’s picture falls out of a box. Lena admits that he is indeed her boyfriend, leaving Eli in shock!
48	3	February 13, 2008
Onay’s loyalty to Celine pushes her to be sarcastic towards Vanessa during dinnertime. Corazon intimidates her by rubbing it in that she’s only a “muchacha" but Celine runs into Onay’s defense. When JB stepped in, Corazon is left without a choice but to send Vanessa on her way. As it is, Corazon thinks that she can use Vanessa to back up her business ideas. Soon after that, Onay also tries to leave but JB insisted to take her home. The two get stranded in a deserted street when JB’s car breaks down. While waiting for a tow truck, JB apologizes for being too hard on her before. And now, their similar affection for Celine establishes genuine friendship between them. Meanwhile, Lena’s deeply troubled when she learns that Joaquin is appearing in Eli’s nightmares. As such, Eli and Jackie decide to search for answers from Nana Impo in the province. Fidel on the other hand goes berserk, thinking that Eli’s getting lax with his job since he's taking a leave again just to accompany his daughters to nowhere.
49	4	February 14, 2008
Mateo is enjoying his lunch date with Corazon when he suddenly spots Fidel and Monique in the restaurant. He invites the two to join them even though the tinge of dislike between him and Fidel is obvious.Tension rises however as soon as Mateo mentions that he would have married a girl once but was ruined because of an enemy. As such, Fidel hurriedly switches to another table before Monique could grasp what was being hinted at. Lena, Jackie and Eli join forces in searching for Joaquin. Nana Impo tells them that perhaps, Eli’s dream wants them to return to the place where Lena and Joaquin first found their love. Lena insists that Joaquin is alive and that they will be reunited in time. Also, Eli learns that his near-death experience has made him open to odd visions. And Nana Impo reminds him that love will always guide him through various struggles. The past stressful days take its toll on Celine. As soon as JB has gone out of town, Celine’s frail health becomes more noticeable. Good thing Onay is constantly beside her now that she has decided to accept her care-giving job permanently.
50	5	February 15, 2008
In Tagaytay, Vanessa takes drastic steps in seducing JB for real. She enters his bedroom in the middle of the night but JB brushes off her overtures. JB makes it clear that he’s really committed to Celine so Vanessa ends up being friends with him instead. Back in the spa, Corazon puts a guilt trip on Celine for letting JB shoulder the burden in their family. This adds up to Celine’s despair especially after hearing the doctor’s diagnosis that her cancer is advancing and that the chemo therapy has failed to make her better. As such, Celine chooses to suffer alone. First, she secretly checks JB out in his work site then decides to flee home for a while. Onay however refuses to let her set off alone. Then when JB finally arrives, he is shocked to see that most of Celine’s clothes are gone.

=== Week 11 ===
No. overall	Number in Week	Original release date
51	1	February 18, 2008
JB is worried sick for Celine and he gets in a row with Corazon because of it. He tries to reach Onay on her phone and even pumps Joko for information, all in vain. Actually, Onay accompanies Celine in her favorite island only to return home alone with Celine’s letter for JB. Onay is deeply affected with Celine’s wish to free JB from more burdens now that it seems that she’s dying. Meanwhile, Lena is filled with hope after reading Joaquin’s year-old letter. There she learns that Joaquin has never stopped loving her and is still waiting for them to be reunited all this time. However, her trip with Eli and Jackie causes Fidel to be more hostile with Eli. Worse, Fidel accuses him of negligence which results to a 400 million-peso loss in their company! Then Fidel ends up punching Eli in front of the board!
52	2	February 19, 2008
Eli knows how much Jackie loves her parents but the spat between him and Fidel has reached its peak, hence, he decides to leave the Madrigal home. Fidel is enraged as expected and he coldly tells them not to come back again once they leave their house for good. Their family feud hits the news and investors are starting to doubt the company. As such, Mateo pays Fidel a visit in the office to clear the air for his son. But Fidel refuses to make amends and reveals that he’s deliberately making Eli’s life difficult because of his grudge with Mateo. Meanwhile, Onay hands Celine’s letter to JB. Not even her sympathy for JB can force her to tell JB where Celine is. In the island, Celine is actually suffering alone, desperately wanting another chance with JB. On the other hand, Corazon is still riled that JB loves Celine more than her. Out of depression, she spends the night with Mateo but later dismisses their intimate encounter as a mistake. And such detached reaction makes Mateo grow weary of Corazon.
53	3	February 20, 2008
JB learns from Onay where Celine is by accident. Together they look for Celine in the island but Celine is clearly determined to be free of JB. Until the last minute, JB keeps on professing how much he loves her and even strips himself of his pride. As such, Celine weakens with JB’s great love for her. With Jackie’s urging, Eli seeks a truce with Fidel back home. Yet despite his humility, Fidel still turns his back on them. Soon after that, Eli and Jackie begin to relocate in their new house. Jackie can’t help feeling sad though so Eli assures her that nothing really matters as long as they are together. Meanwhile, Corazon suddenly proposes marriage to Mateo just to appease his ruffled feelings. He then gives her an engagement ring in front of Daniel. To protect his friend however, Daniel tells Corazon to sign a pre-nuptial agreement. Mateo is enraged by this suggestion but later realizes the wisdom of it.
54	4	February 21, 2008
In the heat of the moment, JB and Celine exchange their wedding vows by the beach with Onay as witness. JB then tells Celine that he has taken a leave of absence for their honeymoon. As such, Onay returns home after presenting Celine the ring that JB threw the night before. Eli gets back on his feet at the office only to learn that Fidel had interfered with his work. He confronts Fidel about it but the latter merely insults him more by saying that he can run the company without Eli’s ineffective efforts. This incident is cast aside in the meantime as Eli and Jackie join the newly-weds in the island. Corazon is forced to sign a pre-nup agreement but later accuses Mateo of not trusting her.
55	5	February 22, 2008
In the hospital, JB is crushed upon hearing the doctor’s diagnosis on Celine’s failing health. As such, he begs Corazon to make peace with Celine before it’s too late. Corazon then visits Celine and even wishes her well on her marriage to JB. Corazon continues to ignore Gloria however when they accidentally meet there, not caring that Gloria is obviously affected with her engagement with Mateo. Meanwhile, a friend of Fidel tips him off that someone in the company is trying to spread doubts among the investors. So he calls them for a meeting to reassure them about MGC’s status without Mateo and Eli’s knowledge. But Mateo surprisingly arrives and even gets sarcastic on Fidel. The tension between them causes Fidel to suffer from a mild heart attack right after their discussion.

=== Week 12 ===
No. overall	Number in Week	Original release date
56	1	February 25, 2008
Fidel refuses to accept Eli’s apology just because he’s Mateo's son. In turn, Eli accuses Mateo of using him in his revenge against Fidel. But Mateo repeatedly denies this as well as the allegation that he started the rumors which threaten to ruin MGC’s reputation. He then decides to pull out his investments since everyone is blaming him. Eli’s pleas however force Mateo to stay with the company for now. Jackie and JB have decided to sell the spa to finance Celine’s treatments. Onay on the other hand is increasingly worried about Celine especially after she predicts an imminent death from her cards! In the meantime, Mateo ends his ties with Daniel causing the latter to reveal his plots to Fidel. This leads to Mateo’s tussle with an unknown assailant who’s hell-bent on killing him!
57	2	February 26, 2008
Mateo decides to pull out his investments from MGC and blames Fidel for the incident that almost took his life. Fidel tells him to spare the company and Eli further hurt by leaving the company for good. Daniel later pulls out his investment too after his goon failed to murder Mateo. Eli makes an enemy out of Mateo as well when he decides to side with Fidel—the father of his wife whom he has learned to love. Celine is released from the hospital and helps JB move their stuff to their new house. Onay is also back and inspires Celine to live on for JB. Deep down however, Onay is suffering from her own share of burdens. Lolo Bogs even reminds her that if he passes away, he wants her to start looking for her long-lost father. And surprisingly, Onay brings out a tape recording which Mateo sent his wife before!
58	3	February 27, 2008
Onay persuades Celine to see a healing pastor. Together with JB, Celine braves the crowd of hopeful people who also looks for their own miracle. They have waited all day for their turn but Celine lets a boy with his sick grandmother to take her place. On their way home, Celine asks JB to help some stranded strangers who turn out to be the pastor’s flock! The latter is so grateful to them that he agrees to pray over Celine there and then. Late that night, Celine suffers from a painful attack but she chooses to believe that she was already cured. JB still rushes her on the hospital and much to his surprise, the doctor tells him that there has been a dramatic reduction in the area of Celine’s cancer. And there is a huge chance that Celine may recover soon! Meanwhile, Onay panics when Lolo Bogs incurs a raging fever. She prays that her surrogate parent will not leave her soon since she has no plans to find her real father anyway. Mateo refuses to see anyone now that Fidel has waged war against him.
59	4	February 28, 2008
Just to annoy Fidel, Mateo personally invites him to his wedding with Corazon. Truth is, he merely rubs the fact that two more investors pulled out from MGC. Fidel is further enraged when Mateo jibes that he will feel more defeated when Monique and Jackie get involved in their feud. Eli happens to catch their last exchange, asks Fidel for an explanation but only gets insulted again. By this time, Jackie in turn chances upon Mateo to get some answers on what’s really happening but the latter also turns her away. At home, she gets into a row with Eli as he roughly insists not to meddle with the delicate situation between him, Mateo and Fidel. Later however, Eli has decided to reveal to her the root of Mateo and Fidel’s deep grudges against each other. Meanwhile, only Lena, JB and Celine are present on Corazon and Mateo’s nuptials. And it seems that the groom is the only joyful one as revulsion briefly mars Corazon’s face before Mateo seals their vows with a kiss. Then right after the ceremony, JB rushes to meet with Daniel who called him to reveal the dark secrets of Mateo.
60	5	February 29, 2008
After discovering Fidel’s cruelty against Mateo, Jackie loses her respect for her father. Lena’s plea however convinces her to attend her parents’ anniversary. But instead of going for a truce, Jackie enrages Fidel when she confronts him about his mistakes in the past. Fidel stays silent amidst her accusations then settles on slapping Jackie in the face. Their bitter confrontation leads Jackie and Eli to Celine and JB’s new home where Eli learns that his long-lost sibling is still alive. He immediately confronts Mateo about it but the latter merely insists the futility of looking for his daughter. The next day, Monique sets Fidel and Jackie up for a lunch date but the two are not ready to make peace yet. Lena, on the other hand, orders Mateo to fix the mess he made in MGC for her own sake but Mateo forces her to choose between him and Fidel instead. Back home, Lena hears Fidel challenging Mateo to a duel. Monique also discovers Fidel’s intent so she alerts Eli about it. However, no one reaches Mateo and Fidel in time to stop them from killing each other. Eli and JB arrive a tad too late for Mateo is injured and Monique, dead.

=== Week 13 ===
No. overall	Number in Week	Original release date
61	1	March 3, 2008
Looking at Monique’s lifeless body in the morgue, Jackie can’t believe that her mom is really gone. Upon seeing Fidel, Jackie expresses her fury at him for his ruthlessness that led to this heartbreaking event, all for the sake of money, power and pride. For Jackie, it makes no difference whether Mateo or Fidel is to blame. In truth though, both father and daughter are haunted by their memories of Monique. Eli feels helpless towards Jackie’s grief and ends up accusing Mateo of killing Monique. Mateo however is trying to remember exactly what happened and he believes that he’s not guilty of the crime. But since Eli is already bent on judging him, Mateo chooses not to defend himself to his son or to Corazon. All he knows is that he will fight Fidel until the end. Everyone else is equally devastated with the tragedy. JB somehow blames himself for telling Eli about his long-lost sibling which pushed Mateo into facing Fidel in a duel. Unknown to them, Lolo Bogs is convincing Onay to meet her father before it’s too late. Onay however is still having second thoughts for she can’t forgive the person who abandoned her and her mother. At the funeral, Jackie refuses to leave Monique’s resting place just yet so Eli leaves her alone for a while. Eli then bumps into his father-in-law who swears that he and Mateo will pay for his wife’s death.
62	2	March 4, 2008
The rift between Eli and Jackie widens as Mateo goes on trial in the court. Though both are seated on Fidel’s side, it still doesn’t change the fact that Mateo is Eli’s father. The situation worsens as Jackie believes Fidel’s side of the story—that Mateo was a former lover of Fidel’s mom and he was out to destroy the Madrigal family ever since he returned in their lives. Eli on the other hand vows to Mateo that he will find his long-lost sibling. After begging Daniel for the truth, he learns that Onay is Mateo’s daughter! Together with JB, Eli meets Onay to plead his case. Onay however refuses to reclaim her parentage. As a last resort, Eli reveals that it was Mateo’s great love for her was the reason behind his fury the night he fought with Fidel. This disclosure paves the way for a reconciliation between Mateo and Onay as she agrees to stand as a witness to Mateo’s goodness despite his faults as a father.
63	3	March 5, 2008
While Onay is happy now that she’s reunited with her real family, her brother Eli is suffering from Jackie’s continuous indifference. He tries his best to woo his wife back but she demands space for herself and her grieving dad. As such, Eli spends the following days in a drunken stupor. As soon as JB arrives home from the trial, he finds Celine lying unconscious on the floor. He then brings her to the hospital where he learns that Celine’s cancer has relapsed! By this time, Jackie has also discovered that she is pregnant. But she still checks on her ailing cousin who advises her to mend fences with Eli. Meanwhile, Lena returns from her trip in the province with the news that Joaquin is already dead. She drops by Eli’s house to share his grief with Jackie. But since her sister is not there, she ends up commiserating with him. Intoxicated, Lena begins to kiss Eli, thinking that he’s Joaquin. Much to their surprise, Jackie suddenly arrives and catches them in an intimate situation! Eli tries to explain that she had it wrong but Jackie already accuses him and Lena of fooling her all along. The stressful fight causes her to bleed and lose her baby yet again.
64	4	March 6, 2008
Both Eli and Lena are remorseful for causing Jackie’s miscarriage. But with Fidel adding fuel to the fire, Jackie remains indifferent towards their pleas for forgiveness. After talking to Celine though, Eli tries to get past Fidel to see his wife again but the latter stops him by force. In another instance, Lena also explains to her sister that for one crazy moment, she thought Eli was Joaquin so she kissed him that night. But her admission that she wanted to steal Eli away from her before only proves that she’s really at fault. To her shame, Lena bids Fidel goodbye then leaves the home that she has come to love. In the prison, Mateo expresses his gratitude to Lolo Bogs for taking care of his daughter all these years. At the same time, he announces his intention to make Onay his sole heir as well as the head of his business. Instead of getting excited, Onay begs Mateo to find it in his heart to accept her brother. Because despite the conflicts between them, she believes that Mateo still cares for Eli. Meanwhile, Celine’s health worsens with each passing day. Hence, she asks Onay to promise to be there, perhaps for JB, even if she’s gone. Then one night, she wakes JB up just to take her back to the place where they first fell in love with each other.
65	5	March 7, 2008
In the trial court, Mateo finally narrates his side of the story. During the cross-examination, he admits that the gun which killed Monique was his yet denies the accusation that he was responsible for her death. But his vague memory of what happened further establishes his guilt. Meanwhile, Lena enters a convent where she comes to terms with her sins, grief and confusion. On the other hand, Eli’s dilemma increases when Jackie packs her clothes and leaves their house for good. He seeks Jackie’s mercy by reminding her of the things that they’ve conquered together, all to no avail. Back in the island, Celine spends what’s left of her life watching the sunset with JB, making him sing their song and recalling the beautiful memories that will be forever etched in her heart. She smiles at the thought, leans on JB’s shoulder, and then slowly closes her eyes. That’s when JB notices Celine's lifeless body before shouting her name in pain.

=== Week 14 ===
No. overall	Number in Week	Original release date
66	1	March 10, 2008
Except for Mateo, everyone else participates in scattering Celine’s ashes in the beach which held beautiful memories for her. Even Corazon genuinely grieves for Celine's death and regrets distancing herself to his son's wife before. JB on the other hand pretends to be strong enough to move on as he busies himself with loads of work in Mateo’s company which is being managed by his mom for the time being. Well-aware of his sorrow, Corazon asks JB not to push himself too hard. But the latter merely brushes off her concern and accuses her of feeling relieved now that Celine is gone. Onay, who happens to witness the whole exchange, tells JB that Celine would be disappointed with his attitude. But JB doesn’t care about anything anymore except putting an end to his misery. After several months, the court finally charges Mateo guilty of murder. Onay suggests a motion for appeal but her father insists to pay for all his sins inside the prison. Mateo also asks for Eli’s forgiveness and even advises him to fix his problem with Jackie. But it seems it’s also too late for Eli as Jackie decides to annul their marriage.
67	2	March 11, 2008
Corazon promotes Onay from being her secretary to a marketing head who’ll directly report to JB. The career move should have been wonderful except that JB has become a difficult boss like before. Onay understands that he’s grieving but embarrassing her in front of their colleagues is too much. Nevertheless, she still wants to be there for him just as she promised Celine. Truth be told, Jackie's equally crushed with her decision to annul his marriage with Eli. But she hardens her heart as Fidel keeps on reminding her how Eli and his father have destroyed their family. As she files for an annulment, she also goes job-hunting since her father’s savings is already depleting. At the same time, she visits Mateo in the prison to tell him that he deserves his punishment for killing Monique. Mateo on the other hand asks only one thing from her, that is, to give Eli another chance. But Jackie retorts that she’s merely reminded of everything she lost every time she looks at Eli. She didn’t expect her husbands persistence however as he forces her to work things out with him that night.
68	3	March 12, 2008
Corazon gets mad when JB tells her that he’s going to another rock-climbing trip with his friends. Onay even interferes during their fight which endears her more to Corazon. They even dine together that night. But when JB doesn’t show up the next day and Onay messes up his report, Corazon scolds her a bit for being unprepared. In the prison, Corazon tells Mateo that she surprisingly finds herself liking his daughter more than her own son who’s growing more distant these days. Mateo understands however that JB is still in mourning. On the other hand, he’s happy to hear that Corazon has learned to accept Onay hence, his plea for her to come to terms with Eli too. And it seems that the "cold-hearted woman" we've known before has truly mellowed down as Corazon finds it in her heart to welcome Eli in his father’s company. She even cites Onay’s advice that perhaps starting afresh is not impossible for former enemies like them.
69	4	March 13, 2008
It seems Corazon has finally found a perfect match for her son with Onay. After helping her do a makeover, Corazon also manipulates JB into bringing Onay home one night. But JB is oblivious to Onay's charm and becomes more callous with her as she reminds him of Celine so much. And when he sees her wearing a dress from his wife, JB tells her never to wear such inappropriate clothes at the office again. Meanwhile, Jackie's financial problems keep on piling up as Fidel squanders their remaining properties on his gambling activities. Good thing she finally gets herself a stable job not to mention a kind-hearted boss to boot. But while she's slowly picking up the pieces of her life, Eli is still obsessed in getting her back. At one point, Eli even hits Mark after seeing him with Jackie, who insists that she wants him out of her life.
70	5	March 14, 2008
Onay punches Eli on the face just to stop him from raising hell. But his bitter encounter with Jackie and her boss leaves him drunk the whole night which forces Onay to take a leave so she can look after her brother. In the meantime, her absence from the office enrages JB who wants her to attend to her responsibilities immediately. But since she hasn't shown up, JB vents his anger to Corazon. Her mother on the other hand merely laughs at his strange reaction towards Onay. As soon as Eli gets sober, he visits Monique's grave to help him think things through. It finally dawns upon him that it's too late to fix his marriage so he meets up with Jackie to tell her that he will cooperate with their process of annulment. Back in Mateo’s company, Onay presents her new marketing ideas to the board but JB embarrasses her again by discrediting her report. Later, she learns that JB hates the mere sight of her because she reminds him of Celine so much.

=== Week 15 ===
No. overall	Number in Week	Original release date
71	1	March 17, 2008
When JB falls into an accident, Onay persistently looks after him for the sake of her promise to Celine. JB resents her concern at first but as soon as he recovered from his injuries, he makes peace with his grief then later on with Onay. This time starting afresh includes being "extra nice" to Onay, whose secret feelings for JB is returning as Corazon gives her blessing for her to heal JB’s broken heart! Meanwhile, Jackie and Eli’s annulment case is now on court. Jackie strengthens her petition as she narrates Eli and Lena’s betrayal which led to her miscarriage. Outside the trial though, Eli begins to pick up the pieces in his life by performing well in Mateo’s company. Jackie on the other hand is still oblivious to Lena’s regular visits at Monique’s grave. What leaves her in shock though is seeing Eli with a date in a restaurant where she is meeting with a client!
72	2	March 18, 2008
In the restaurant, both Jackie and Eli can hardly take their eyes off each other. So at the heat of the moment, Jackie can’t help responding to Eli’s passionate kisses when he grabbed her at the elevator towards the kitchen, oblivious to their stunned spectators. A loud crash however brings Jackie back to the reality of their ongoing annulment. Eli tries to fix their marriage again but Jackie keeps on denying their strong bond. Not long after that, the court rules that their marriage be null and void. Meanwhile, JB gets mad at Onay when she flirts her way to a deal with Mr. Cosme. Ignorant of the games men play, Onay unconsciously leads the man on hence, she later finds herself being harassed right there in the office! JB rescues her from Mr. Cosme’s advances but then he also accuses her of acting like a whore. Deeply hurt, Onay tearfully exclaims that she was wrong to believe that JB has really changed. As such, she decides to give up her efforts to become someone other than the simple Onay that she is.
73	3	March 19, 2008
Jackie visits her home with Eli for the last time, filling herself with their memories together before she starts afresh with her dad in a far-off place. After three months, Eli also begins to pick up the pieces in his life though he still hopes to find Jackie one day. Pong who has just gotten out of prison advises him to stop his futile search of Jackie, to no avail. At a bus station going to San Rafael, Eli catches a vague glimpse of Jackie but fails to catch her as she went ahead of him and Pong. Onay on the other hand takes refuge at Celine’s favorite island where she sings at a bar to pass time. Eli has a hint that the reason for her sudden need for solitude is her growing feelings for JB. JB is in fact missing her company but is not yet ready to admit that he’s falling for Onay too. But while searching through Celine’s memoirs, JB stumbles upon a CD similar to the one Onay receives from the mail, containing Celine’s last message to them!

=== Week 16 ===
No. overall	Number in Week	Original release date
74	1	March 24, 2008
Hearing Celine’s message intensifies Onay’s confusion because she knows that taking care of JB will only cause her more pain. Just like Celine’s wish for her, she has indeed found her one true love who, sadly, cannot love her back. In the meantime, Corazon worries for her son who turned his home into a waste land, the ultimate party place for lost souls like him. Well-aware that only Onay can put some sense into him, she forces her stepdaughter to return home at once. Pong tries to discourage Eli from setting out to San Rafael with only his gut feel to depend on in finding Jackie. Fate however seems to smile down upon Eli for Jackie really resides in the town's farthest barrio, working as a teacher. In fact, one of her favorite students, Eleazar, insists on being called “Eli”, much to Jackie’s amusement. During a trip to the market, Eleazar tags along with Jackie but gets lost when a food stall catches his eye. Coincidentally, Eli is also buying from the same store and even treats the kid to some goodies. As Jackie locates her student's whereabouts, she and Eli finally meet again after two years of separation.
75	2	March 25, 2008
After hiding from JB for months, Onay decides to follow Celine’s wish, Corazon’s plea and most importantly, her heart. As soon as she’s back in Manila, the first thing she did is to clean up JB's mess in his condo. Since JB has also seen Celine’s message for him, he begins to get his act together by renewing his friendship with Onay. She’s not making it easy on him though as she pretends to be an imposing mother hen. Back in San Rafael, Eli insists on wooing Jackie back though she clearly wants him to go away. He even tries to visit her at home but facing Fidel’s wrath makes it impossible. As such, he consoles himself by attending her class with the kids. However, reviving their relationship becomes highly unlikely as Jackie claims that she doesn’t love him anymore. That same night, Fidel is warning Jackie not to see Eli again when Veron’s sudden arrival leaves him in shock. As it is, Veron merely brings them to an ailing Lena whose last wish is to be reconciled with her sister. Both siblings are moved to tears as they let bygones be bygones. Fidel on the other hand is totally crushed to see her daughter in such a terrible condition.
76	3	March 26, 2008
Veron explains to Jackie that Lena got her illness from the medical missions she attended while she was in the congregation. Bringing her back to the hospital is useless since the doctors have already given up on her case. As such, Lena spends the last moments of her life reconciling her differences with Fidel, Jackie and Eli. Her last wish is for Eli and Jackie to be reunited again and at the very least will die happy knowing that Veron is contented with her married life with Bahad. Then as death looms over her, Lena asks them to bring her at the bridge where Joaquin died waiting for her. Finally, the moment she has been waiting for arrives as she meets her beloved Joaquin in the afterlife.
77	4	March 27, 2008
After more than two years inside the prison, Mateo is still troubled by his recurring dreams about Monique. It finally dawns on him that Daniel witnessed the whole incident and it was really Fidel who fired the shot that killed his wife. He shares this latest development with Eli and Onay as well as his decision to reopen his murder case. This is the very thing that scares Fidel most for he is also hunted by his vivid memories of Monique's death especially after seeing Eli again. Still in denial of his own sins, he forces Jackie to promise him never to settle things with Eli again, as if this would make his fears and the truth go away. Jackie however receives a call from a mysterious guy, telling her that he knows what really happened to her mother. As such, she agrees to secretly meet with him, not knowing that Fidel heard their whole exchange.
78	5	March 28, 2008
The truth about Monique's death would have been revealed earlier on if Daniel hasn't chickened out during Mateo's trial in the court two years ago. But as he finally stands up for what is just, Mateo escapes the prison to face Fidel again, in the same place where they fought before. This time however, Jackie, JB, Onay and Eli arrive in time to stop them from killing each other. When Fidel refuses to calm down though, Mateo reveals that it was the former who killed Monique back then. Faced with his guilt, Fidel loses his sanity and later lands in a mental hospital even amidst Jackie’s forgiveness. After six months, Mateo is released from the prison, Corazon encourages JB to love again and Jackie finally realizes that she still loves Eli. As such, Jackie runs after him just when he's about to give up on her. Luckily, Eli hears her plea and both of them are reconciled at last. In the end, Jackie gets pregnant and lives happily married with Eli. On the other hand, JB seeks Onay’s forgiveness in the island. Not one to carry a grudge for so long, Onay agrees to be friends with him as they keep in mind their special memories of Celine.

== See also ==
- Maging Sino Ka Man
